= 2023 Rugby World Cup Pool D =

Pool D of the 2023 Rugby World Cup began on 9 September 2023 and concluded on 8 October 2023. The pool included 2003 champions and 2019 runner-ups England, previous hosts Japan, and Argentina. They are joined by Samoa, the winner of the Oceania 1 qualifier, and tournament debutants Chile (Americas 2). England topped the group and Argentina placed second, thus allowing both teams to progress.

== Teams ==
Pos.	Team	Band	Confederation	Method of qualification	Date of qualification	Apps.	Last	Previous best performance	World Rugby Rankings	
Pos.	Team	Band	Confederation	Method of qualification	Date of qualification	Apps.	Last	Previous best performance	1 January 2020 (Note: The rankings of 1 January 2020 were used for seeding for the final draw.)	4 September 2023
D1	England	1	Europe	Top 3 in 2019 RWC pool	5 October 2019	10th	2019	Winners (2003)	3	8
D2	Japan	2	Asia	Top 3 in 2019 RWC pool	5 October 2019	10th	2019	Quarter-finals (2019)	8	14
D3	Argentina	3	South America	Top 3 in 2019 RWC pool	9 October 2019	10th	2019	Third place (2007)	10	6
D4	Samoa	4 (Note: As the identity of the Oceania 1 winners was not known at the time of the final draw, positions in the World Rugby Rankings were not taken into account, and the placeholder in the draw was automatically seeded into band 4.)	Oceania	Oceania 1	17 July 2021	9th	2019	Quarter-finals (1991, 1995)	15	12
D5	Chile	5 (Note: As the identity of the Americas 2 winners was not known at the time of the final draw, positions in the World Rugby Rankings were not taken into account, and the placeholder in the draw was automatically seeded into band 5.)	South America	Americas 2	16 July 2022	1st	—N/a		29	22

== Overview ==
In the opening match of Pool D, England defeated Argentina by 27–10. Despite losing Tom Curry to a red card for a dangerous head-to-head with Juan Cruz Mallía, England went over the line courtesy of a player-of-the-match performance from George Ford who scored three drop goals and six penalties, with Argentina's Rodrigo Bruni scoring the only try of the match. Japan faced debutants Chile the following day, in which Japan came out winners in a score of 42–12 despite the best efforts of Chile in their first World Cup appearance. After a six day rest, Samoa played their first match of the pool against Chile in which they came out with a 43–10 bonus-point victory in Bordeaux. The next day, England secured a bonus point victory over Japan in a 34–12 win.

On 22 September, Argentina defeated Samoa with a scoreline of 19–10, with Emiliano Boffelli securing a converted try and 3 penalties, earning him player of the match. The result left the group finely poised and lifted hopes of progression to the knockout stage for Argentina. The next day, England moved on to the brink of qualifying for the knockout stage, after defeating Chile with a scoreline of 71–0 with Henry Arundell earning player of the match having scored five tries in the match. Chile were officially eliminated from the tournament following the result. As Pool D began to near its conclusion, Japan faced Samoa on 28 September in a match of high stakes for both sides. Tries from Lappies Labuschagné, Michael Leitch and Kazuki Himeno secured Japan a 28–22 victory over the Samoans to boost their hopes of progression to the knockout stage, while officially securing England's place who were thus confirmed to top the pool. Samoa, who lost Ben Lam to a red card for an upright tackle, were left requiring a victory in their final match against England to have a chance at progression. Two days later, on 30 September, Chile played their last match of their first ever Rugby World Cup against Argentina in Nantes in what was the first ever meeting between two South American sides in a World Cup. The Argentinians raced to a 59–5 victory over the Chileans, scoring eight tries along with strong kicking from Nicolás Sánchez and Santiago Carreras to set up a showdown with Japan on the final matchday to decide who would join England in the quarter-finals.

On 7 October, England played their final match of the pool against Samoa in Villeneuve-d'Ascq. Despite a valiant effort from the Samoans, who scored two tries through Nigel Ah Wong, England edged the match 18–17 thanks to a Danny Care try in the 73rd minute. That gave England a clean sweep of wins from Pool D and qualification for the quarter-finals; it also eliminated any hope of Samoa progressing themselves, confirming Argentina and Japan as the other two qualifiers for the 2027 Rugby World Cup before their final match took place. That final match the following day would decide who would finish second and join England in the knockout stage. The high stakes match took place in Nantes, where Mateo Carreras scored a hat-trick as Argentina came out 39–27 victors in a 66-point thriller to finish second in the pool and send themselves through to the quarter-finals with England; Argentina won the match 39–27, consigning Japan to third place.

== Standings ==
Pos	Team	Pld	W	D	L	PF	PA	PD	TF	TA	B	Pts	Qualification
1	England	4	4	0	0	150	39	+111	17	3	2	18	Advance to knockout stage, and qualification to the 2027 Men's Rugby World Cup
2	Argentina	4	3	0	1	127	69	+58	15	5	2	14	Advance to knockout stage, and qualification to the 2027 Men's Rugby World Cup
3	Japan	4	2	0	2	109	107	+2	12	14	1	9	Qualification to the 2027 Men's Rugby World Cup
4	Samoa	4	1	0	3	92	75	+17	11	7	3	7	
5	Chile	4	0	0	4	27	215	−188	4	30	0	0	

Source: World Rugby
Rules for classification: Pool stage tiebreakers

== Matches ==
=== England vs Argentina ===
9 September 2023
21:00 CEST (UTC+2)

England	27–10	Argentina
Pen: Ford (6/6) 10', 46', 54', 59', 66', 75'; Drop: Ford (3/3) 27', 31', 37'	Report	Try: Bruni 79' c Con: Boffelli (1/1) 80'; Pen: Boffelli (1/2) 5'

Stade Vélodrome, Marseille
Attendance: 63,118
Referee: Mathieu Raynal (France)

England	Argentina

FB	15	Freddie Steward
RW	14	Jonny May
OC	13	Joe Marchant
IC	12	Manu Tuilagi		(substituted off) 69'
LW	11	Elliot Daly
FH	10	George Ford		(substituted off) 76'
SH	9	Alex Mitchell		(substituted off) 59'
N8	8	Ben Earl
OF	7	Tom Curry	(red card) 3'
BF	6	Courtney Lawes (c)		(substituted off) 65'
RL	5	Ollie Chessum		(substituted off) 59'
LL	4	Maro Itoje
TP	3	Dan Cole		(substituted off) 50'
HK	2	Jamie George		(substituted off) 72'
LP	1	Ellis Genge		(substituted off) 54'
Replacements:
HK	16	Theo Dan		(substituted in) 72'
PR	17	Joe Marler		(substituted in) 54'
PR	18	Will Stuart		(substituted in) 50'
LK	19	George Martin		(substituted in) 59'
FL	20	Lewis Ludlam		(substituted in) 66'
SH	21	Danny Care		(substituted in) 59'
FH	22	Marcus Smith		(substituted in) 76'
CE	23	Ollie Lawrence		(substituted in) 69'
Coach:
(England) Steve Borthwick

FB	15	Juan Cruz Mallía		3' to 10'
RW	14	Emiliano Boffelli
OC	13	Lucio Cinti
IC	12	Santiago Chocobares
LW	11	Mateo Carreras				(substituted off) 63'
FH	10	Santiago Carreras	(yellow card) 10'
SH	9	Gonzalo Bertranou		(substituted off) 69'
N8	8	Juan Martín González		(substituted off) 59'
OF	7	Marcos Kremer
BF	6	Pablo Matera
RL	5	Tomás Lavanini		(substituted off) 50'
LL	4	Matías Alemanno		(substituted off) 40'
TP	3	Francisco Gómez Kodela		(substituted off) 63'
HK	2	Julián Montoya (c)		(substituted off) 69'
LP	1	Thomas Gallo		(substituted off) 50'	(substituted in) 69'
Replacements:
HK	16	Agustín Creevy		(substituted in) 69'
PR	17	Joel Sclavi		(substituted in) 50'	(substituted off) 69'
PR	18	Eduardo Bello		(substituted in) 63'
LK	19	Guido Petti		(substituted in) 40'
LK	20	Pedro Rubiolo		(substituted in) 50'
FL	21	Rodrigo Bruni		(substituted in) 59'
SH	22	Lautaro Bazán		(substituted in) 69'
CE	23	Matías Moroni		(substituted in) 3'	(substituted off) 10'	(substituted in) 63'
Coach:
(Australia) Michael Cheika

Player of the Match:
George Ford (England)

Assistant referees:
Ben O'Keeffe (New Zealand)
Pierre Brousset (France)
Television match official:
Marius Jonker (South Africa)

Notes:

- Tom Curry became the first England player to be sent off at a Rugby World Cup. It was also the fastest red card in a World Cup match, and the first ever to be issued at the tournament via the World Rugby foul play review process (a system introduced in August 2023, during the Summer Nations Series).

=== Japan vs Chile ===
10 September 2023
13:00 CEST (UTC+2)

(1 BP) Japan	42–12	Chile
Try: Fakatava (2) 8' c, 40+1' c Naikabula 30' c Leitch 53' c Nakamura 71' c Dearns 79' c Con: Matsuda (6/6) 10', 31', 40+2', 54', 73', 80+1'	Report	Try: Fernández 6' c A. Escobar 48' m Con: Videla (1/2) 7'

Stadium de Toulouse, Toulouse
Attendance: 30,187
Referee: Nic Berry (Australia)

Japan	Chile

FB	15	Semisi Masirewa		(substituted off) 56'
RW	14	Kotaro Matsushima
OC	13	Dylan Riley	(yellow card) 46'
IC	12	Ryōto Nakamura
LW	11	Jone Naikabula		(substituted off) 63'
FH	10	Rikiya Matsuda
SH	9	Yutaka Nagare (c)		(substituted off) 61'
N8	8	Jack Cornelsen
OF	7	Kanji Shimokawa		(substituted off) 50'
BF	6	Michael Leitch
RL	5	Amato Fakatava		(substituted off) 55'
LL	4	Amanaki Saumaki
TP	3	Koo Ji-won
HK	2	Atsushi Sakate		(substituted off) 50'
LP	1	Keita Inagaki		(substituted off) 58'
Replacements:
HK	16	Shōta Horie		(substituted in) 50'
PR	17	Craig Millar		(substituted in) 58'
PR	18	Asaeli Ai Valu
LK	19	Warner Dearns		(substituted in) 55'
FL	20	Shota Fukui		(substituted in) 50'
SH	21	Naoto Saitō		(substituted in) 61'
CE	22	Tomoki Osada		(substituted in) 63'
WG	23	Lomano Lemeki		(substituted in) 56'
Coach:
(New Zealand) Jamie Joseph

FB	15	Iñaki Ayarza
RW	14	Santiago Videla
OC	13	Domingo Saavedra
IC	12	Nicolás Garafulic
LW	11	Franco Velarde		(substituted off) 29'	(substituted in) 35'	(substituted off) 56'
FH	10	Rodrigo Fernández
SH	9	Marcelo Torrealba
N8	8	Alfonso Escobar
OF	7	Raimundo Martínez		(substituted off) 58'
BF	6	Martín Sigren (c)	(yellow card) 37'
RL	5	Javier Eissmann		(substituted off) 56'
LL	4	Clemente Saavedra		(substituted off) 65'
TP	3	Matías Dittus	(yellow card) 24'			(substituted off) 68'
HK	2	Diego Escobar		(substituted off) 58'
LP	1	Javier Carrasco
Replacements:
HK	16	Augusto Böhme		(substituted in) 58'
PR	17	Salvador Lues
PR	18	Iñaki Gurruchaga		(substituted in) 29'	(substituted off) 35'	(substituted in) 68'
LK	19	Pablo Huete		(substituted in) 65'
LK	20	Santiago Pedrero		(substituted in) 56'
FL	21	Ignacio Silva		(substituted in) 58'
SH	22	Lukas Carvallo
CE	23	José Ignacio Larenas				(substituted in) 56'
Coach:
(Uruguay) Pablo Lemoine

Player of the Match:
Amato Fakatava (Japan)

Assistant referees:
Karl Dickson (England)
Andrea Piardi (Italy)
Television match official:
Tom Foley (England)

Notes:

- This was the first ever meeting between these two nations.
- This was Chile's first game at a Rugby World Cup.
- Keita Inagaki (Japan) earned his 50th test cap.
- Kazuki Himeno was originally named in the starting line-up for Japan, but withdrew prior to the match due to a calf injury. He was replaced in the back row by Jack Cornelsen, whose initial position in the second row was taken by Amanaki Saumaki, while the captaincy was handed over to Yutaka Nagare.

=== Samoa vs Chile ===
16 September 2023
15:00 CEST (UTC+2)

(1 BP) Samoa	43–10	Chile
Try: Paia'aua 40+1' c Taumateine 42' m Lee 47' m Malolo (2) 52' c, 80+1' c Con: Leali'ifano (2/4) 40+2', 53'; Sopoaga (1/1) 80+2'; Pen: Leali'ifano (4/4) 4', 10', 14', 36'	Report	Try: Dittus 6' c Con: Videla (1/1) 7'; Pen: Garafulic (1/1) 30'

Nouveau Stade de Bordeaux, Bordeaux
Attendance: 39,291
Referee: Paul Williams (New Zealand)

Samoa	Chile

FB	15	Duncan Paia'aua
RW	14	Danny Toala		(substituted off) 64'
OC	13	Ulupano Seuteni	(yellow card) 6'
IC	12	Tumua Manu		(substituted off) 56'
LW	11	Nigel Ah Wong
FH	10	Christian Leali'ifano
SH	9	Jonathan Taumateine		(substituted off) 54'
N8	8	Steve Luatua		(substituted off) 58'
OF	7	Fritz Lee
BF	6	Taleni Seu
RL	5	Theo McFarland
LL	4	Chris Vui		(substituted off) 58'
TP	3	Michael Alaalatoa (c)		(substituted off) 54'
HK	2	Seilala Lam		(substituted off) 41'
LP	1	James Lay		(substituted off) 54'
Replacements:
HK	16	Sama Malolo		(substituted in) 41'
PR	17	Jordan Lay		(substituted in) 54'
PR	18	Paul Alo-Emile		(substituted in) 54'
LK	19	Sam Slade		(substituted in) 58'
FL	20	Jordan Taufua		(substituted in) 58'
SH	21	Ere Enari	(yellow card) 64'	(substituted in) 54'
FH	22	Lima Sopoaga		(substituted in) 56'
WG	23	Ed Fidow		(substituted in) 64'
Coach:
(Samoa) Seilala Mapusua

FB	15	Iñaki Ayarza
RW	14	Santiago Videla		(substituted off) 22'
OC	13	Domingo Saavedra
IC	12	Matías Garafulic
LW	11	José Larenas
FH	10	Rodrigo Fernández
SH	9	Marcelo Torrealba		(substituted off) 62'
N8	8	Raimundo Martínez		(substituted off) 41'
OF	7	Clemente Saavedra			(substituted off) 74'
BF	6	Martín Sigren (c)
RL	5	Santiago Pedrero		(substituted off) 54'
LL	4	Pablo Huete		(substituted off) 41'
TP	3	Matías Dittus		(substituted off) 70'	(substituted in) 74'
HK	2	Tomás Dussaillant		(substituted off) 41'	(substituted in) 64'
LP	1	Javier Carrasco		(substituted off) 41'
Replacements:
HK	16	Diego Escobar		(substituted in) 41'	(substituted off) 64'
PR	17	Salvador Lues		(substituted in) 41'
PR	18	Esteban Inostroza	(yellow card) 71'	(substituted in) 70'
LK	19	Javier Eissmann		(substituted in) 41'
FL	20	Alfonso Escobar	(yellow card) 63'	(substituted in) 41'
FL	21	Ignacio Silva		(substituted in) 54'
SH	22	Benjamín Videla		(substituted in) 62'
CE	23	Pablo Casas		(substituted in) 22'
Coach:
(Uruguay) Pablo Lemoine

Player of the Match:
Theo McFarland (Samoa)

Assistant referees:
Angus Gardner (Australia)
James Doleman (New Zealand)
Television match official:
Brett Cronan (Australia)

Notes:

- This was the first ever meeting between these two nations.
- Benjamín Videla (Chile) made his international debut.

=== England vs Japan ===
17 September 2023
21:00 CEST (UTC+2)

(1 BP) England	34–12	Japan
Try: Ludlam 24' c Lawes 56' c Steward 66' c Marchant 80+1' c Con: Ford (4/4) 26', 56', 67', 80+1'; Pen: Ford (2/3) 4', 42'	Report	Pen: Matsuda (4/4) 15', 23', 32', 54'

Allianz Riviera, Nice
Attendance: 30,500
Referee: Nika Amashukeli (Georgia)

England	Japan

FB	15	Freddie Steward	(substituted off) 69'
RW	14	Jonny May
OC	13	Joe Marchant
IC	12	Manu Tuilagi	(substituted off) 69'
LW	11	Elliot Daly
FH	10	George Ford
SH	9	Alex Mitchell	(substituted off) 60'
N8	8	Lewis Ludlam	(substituted off) 51'
OF	7	Ben Earl
BF	6	Courtney Lawes (c)	63' to 73'
RL	5	Ollie Chessum			(substituted off) 74'
LL	4	Maro Itoje
TP	3	Kyle Sinckler	(substituted off) 51'
HK	2	Jamie George	(substituted off) 74'
LP	1	Joe Marler	(substituted off) 60'
Replacements:
HK	16	Theo Dan	(substituted in) 74'
PR	17	Ellis Genge	(substituted in) 60'
PR	18	Will Stuart	(substituted in) 51'
LK	19	George Martin	(substituted in) 63'	(substituted off) 73'	(substituted in) 74'
N8	20	Billy Vunipola	(substituted in) 51'
SH	21	Ben Youngs	(substituted in) 60'
FH	22	Marcus Smith	(substituted in) 69'
CE	23	Ollie Lawrence	(substituted in) 69'
Coach:
(England) Steve Borthwick

FB	15	Semisi Masirewa	(substituted off) 7'
RW	14	Kotaro Matsushima
OC	13	Tomoki Osada
IC	12	Ryōto Nakamura
LW	11	Jone Naikabula	(substituted off) 50'
FH	10	Rikiya Matsuda
SH	9	Yutaka Nagare	(substituted off) 65'
N8	8	Kazuki Himeno (c)
OF	7	Lappies Labuschagné	(substituted off) 74'
BF	6	Michael Leitch
RL	5	Amato Fakatava	(substituted off) 62'
LL	4	Jack Cornelsen
TP	3	Koo Ji-won	(substituted off) 41'
HK	2	Shōta Horie	(substituted off) 62'
LP	1	Keita Inagaki	(substituted off) 50'
Replacements:
HK	16	Atsushi Sakate	(substituted in) 62'
PR	17	Craig Millar	(substituted in) 50'
PR	18	Asaeli Ai Valu	(substituted in) 41'
LK	19	Warner Dearns	(substituted in) 62'
FL	20	Kanji Shimokawa	(substituted in) 74'
SH	21	Naoto Saitō	(substituted in) 65'
CE	22	Dylan Riley	(substituted in) 50'
WG	23	Lomano Lemeki	(substituted in) 7'
Coach:
(New Zealand) Jamie Joseph

Player of the Match:
George Ford (England)

Assistant referees:
Nic Berry (Australia)
Andrea Piardi (Italy)
Television match official:
Joy Neville (Ireland)

Notes:

- This was the first match between England and Japan at a Rugby World Cup since the inaugural tournament in 1987, when the two nations met in the pool stages.

=== Argentina vs Samoa ===
22 September 2023
17:45 CEST (UTC+2)

Argentina	19–10	Samoa
Try: Boffelli 9' c Con: Boffelli (1/1) 10'; Pen: Boffelli (3/4) 25', 34', 54'; Sánchez (1/1) 80'	Report	Try: Malolo 75' c Con: Leuila (1/1) 75'; Pen: Leali'ifano (1/3) 28'

Stade Geoffroy-Guichard, Saint-Étienne
Attendance: 38,358
Referee: Nic Berry (Australia)

Argentina	Samoa

FB	15	Juan Cruz Mallía
RW	14	Emiliano Boffelli
OC	13	Matías Moroni	(substituted off) 71'
IC	12	Santiago Chocobares
LW	11	Mateo Carreras
FH	10	Santiago Carreras	(substituted off) 67'
SH	9	Gonzalo Bertranou	(substituted off) 67'
N8	8	Juan Martín González	(substituted off) 56'
OF	7	Marcos Kremer
BF	6	Pablo Matera
RL	5	Matías Alemanno	(substituted off) 61'
LL	4	Guido Petti
TP	3	Eduardo Bello	(substituted off) 43'
HK	2	Julián Montoya (c)	(substituted off) 73'
LP	1	Thomas Gallo	(substituted off) 80'
Replacements:
HK	16	Agustín Creevy	(substituted in) 73'
PR	17	Mayco Vivas	(substituted in) 80'
PR	18	Francisco Gómez Kodela	(substituted in) 43'
LK	19	Pedro Rubiolo	(substituted in) 61'
FL	20	Rodrigo Bruni	(substituted in) 56'
SH	21	Tomás Cubelli	(substituted in) 67'
FH	22	Nicolás Sánchez	(substituted in) 67'
CE	23	Lucio Cinti	(substituted in) 71'
Coach:
(Australia) Michael Cheika

FB	15	Duncan Paia'aua	(yellow card) 1'	(substituted off) 58'
RW	14	Nigel Ah Wong
OC	13	Ulupano Seuteni		(substituted off) 49'
IC	12	Tumua Manu
LW	11	Ben Lam
FH	10	Christian Leali'ifano
SH	9	Jonathan Taumateine
N8	8	Steven Luatua		(substituted off) 60'
OF	7	Fritz Lee
BF	6	Theo McFarland
RL	5	Chris Vui (c)
LL	4	Brian Alainu'uese		(substituted off) 55'
TP	3	Paul Alo-Emile		(substituted off) 55'
HK	2	Seilala Lam		(substituted off) 56'
LP	1	James Lay		(substituted off) 55'
Replacements:
HK	16	Sama Malolo		(substituted in) 56'
PR	17	Charlie Faumuina		(substituted in) 55'
PR	18	Michael Alaalatoa		(substituted in) 55'
LK	19	Taleni Seu		(substituted in) 55'
FL	20	Jordan Taufua		(substituted in) 60'
SH	21	Melani Matavao
CE	22	D'Angelo Leuila		(substituted in) 49'
FB	23	Danny Toala		(substituted in) 58'
Coach:
(Samoa) Seilala Mapusua

Player of the Match:
Emiliano Boffelli (Argentina)

Assistant referees:
Nika Amashukeli (Georgia)
Jordan Way (Australia)
Television match official:
Brett Cronan (Australia)

Notes:

- Ben Lam (Samoa) made his international debut.

=== England vs Chile ===
23 September 2023
17:45 CEST (UTC+2)

(1 BP) England	71–0	Chile
Try: Arundell (5) 20' m, 30' m, 48' c, 60' c, 69' m Dan (2) 24' c, 45' c Rodd 35' c Smith (2) 40' c, 77' c Willis 80' c Con: Farrell (8/11) 25', 36', 40+2', 46', 49', 62', 78', 80+1'	Report

Stade Pierre-Mauroy, Villeneuve-d'Ascq
Attendance: 44,315
Referee: Jaco Peyper (South Africa)

England	Chile

FB	15	Marcus Smith
RW	14	Henry Arundell
OC	13	Elliot Daly	(substituted off) 50'
IC	12	Ollie Lawrence
LW	11	Max Malins	(substituted off) 71'
FH	10	Owen Farrell (c)
SH	9	Danny Care	(substituted off) 50'
N8	8	Billy Vunipola	(substituted off) 67'
OF	7	Jack Willis
BF	6	Lewis Ludlam	(substituted off) 55'
RL	5	George Martin
LL	4	David Ribbans
TP	3	Kyle Sinckler	(substituted off) 55'
HK	2	Theo Dan	(substituted off) 55'
LP	1	Bevan Rodd	(substituted off) 55'
Replacements:
HK	16	Jack Walker	(substituted in) 55'
PR	17	Joe Marler	(substituted in) 55'
PR	18	Will Stuart	(substituted in) 55'
LK	19	Ollie Chessum	(substituted in) 55'
FL	20	Ben Earl	(substituted in) 67'
SH	21	Ben Youngs	(substituted in) 50'
FH	22	George Ford	(substituted in) 50'
CE	23	Joe Marchant	(substituted in) 71'
Coach:
(England) Steve Borthwick

FB	15	Francisco Urroz
RW	14	Cristobal Game
OC	13	Domingo Saavedra
IC	12	Matías Garafulic		(substituted off) 78'
LW	11	Franco Velarde		(substituted off) 63'
FH	10	Rodrigo Fernández
SH	9	Benjamín Videla
N8	8	Alfonso Escobar		(substituted off) 63'
OF	7	Ignacio Silva		(substituted off) 41'
BF	6	Martín Sigren (c)
RL	5	Javier Eissmann		(substituted off) 62'
LL	4	Clemente Saavedra
TP	3	Matías Dittus	(yellow card) 44'	(substituted off) 63'	(substituted in) 77'
HK	2	Augusto Böhme		(substituted off) 56'
LP	1	Salvador Lues		(substituted off) 56'
Replacements:
HK	16	Tomás Dussaillant		(substituted in) 56'
PR	17	Vittorio Lastra		(substituted in) 56'
PR	18	Iñaki Gurruchaga		(substituted in) 63'	(substituted off) 77'
LK	19	Pablo Huete		(substituted in) 62'
FL	20	Thomas Orchard		(substituted in) 63'
FL	21	Raimundo Martínez		(substituted in) 41'
SH	22	Lukas Carvallo		(substituted in) 78'
FB	23	Iñaki Ayarza		(substituted in) 63'
Coach:
(Uruguay) Pablo Lemoine

Player of the Match:
Henry Arundell (England)

Assistant referees:
Pierre Brousset (France)
Andrea Piardi (Italy)
Television match official:
Marius Jonker (South Africa)

Notes:

- This was the first ever meeting between these two nations.
- England recorded their first ever clean sheet in a World Cup match.
- With five tries, Henry Arundell equalled the England record for most tries scored by one player in a test match (shared with Douglas Lambert, Josh Lewsey and Rory Underwood).

=== Japan vs Samoa ===
28 September 2023
21:00 CEST (UTC+2)

Japan	28–22	Samoa (1 BP)
Try: Labuschagné 13' c Leitch 32' c Himeno 48' m Con: Matsuda (2/3) 15', 33'; Pen: Matsuda (3/3) 28', 56', 75'	Report	Try: S. Lam 38' m Paia'aua 65' c Leali'ifano 78' c Con: Leali'ifano (2/3) 66', 79'; Pen: Leuila (1/2) 25'

Stadium de Toulouse, Toulouse
Attendance: 31,794
Referee: Jaco Peyper (South Africa)

Japan	Samoa

FB	15	Lomano Lemeki
RW	14	Kotaro Matsushima
OC	13	Dylan Riley
IC	12	Ryōto Nakamura		(substituted off) 75'
LW	11	Jone Naikabula		(substituted off) 41'	(substituted in) 47'
FH	10	Rikiya Matsuda		(substituted off) 77'
SH	9	Naoto Saitō		(substituted off) 75'
N8	8	Kazuki Himeno (c)
OF	7	Lappies Labuschagné		47' to 58'
BF	6	Michael Leitch		(substituted off) 75'
RL	5	Amato Fakatava
LL	4	Jack Cornelsen				(substituted off) 63'
TP	3	Koo Ji-won		(substituted off) 47'
HK	2	Shōta Horie	(yellow card) 37'			(substituted off) 58'
LP	1	Keita Inagaki		(substituted off) 47'
Replacements:
HK	16	Atsushi Sakate		(substituted in) 41'	(substituted off) 47'	(substituted in) 58'
PR	17	Craig Millar		(substituted in) 47'
PR	18	Asaeli Ai Valu		(substituted in) 47'
LK	19	Warner Dearns		(substituted in) 47'	(substituted off) 58'	(substituted in) 63'
FL	20	Kanji Shimokawa		(substituted in) 75'
SH	21	Kenta Fukuda		(substituted in) 75'
FH	22	Lee Seung-sin		(substituted in) 77'
CE	23	Tomoki Osada		(substituted in) 75'
Coach:
(New Zealand) Jamie Joseph

FB	15	Duncan Paia'aua
RW	14	Ed Fidow		(substituted off) 73'
OC	13	Tumua Manu
IC	12	D'Angelo Leuila		(substituted off) 33'
LW	11	Ben Lam	(red card) 47'
FH	10	Christian Leali'ifano
SH	9	Jonathan Taumateine	(yellow card) 32'	(substituted off) 58'
N8	8	Jordan Taufua		(substituted off) 58'
OF	7	Fritz Lee (c)
BF	6	Taleni Seu		(substituted off) 5'
RL	5	Theo McFarland
LL	4	Steven Luatua
TP	3	Paul Alo-Emile		(substituted off) 51'
HK	2	Seilala Lam		(substituted off) 51'
LP	1	James Lay		(substituted off) 51'
Replacements:
HK	16	Sama Malolo		(substituted in) 51'
PR	17	Jordan Lay		(substituted in) 51'
PR	18	Michael Alaalatoa		(substituted in) 51'
LK	19	Brian Alainu'uese		(substituted in) 5'
FL	20	Alamanda Motuga		(substituted in) 58'
SH	21	Melani Matavao		(substituted in) 58'
WG	22	Neria Fomai		(substituted in) 73'
FB	23	Danny Toala		(substituted in) 33'
Coach:
(Samoa) Seilala Mapusua

Player of the Match:
Lomano Lemeki (Japan)

Assistant referees:
Ben O'Keeffe (New Zealand)
Craig Evans (Wales)
Television match official:
Marius Jonker (South Africa)

Notes:

- Kenta Fukuda (Japan) made his international debut.
- Yutaka Nagare was originally named in the starting line-up for Japan, but withdrew prior to the match due to injury. He was replaced by Naoto Saitō, whose place on the bench was taken by Kenta Fukuda.
- Chris Vui was originally named in the starting line-up for Samoa as captain, but withdrew prior to the match due to injury. He was replaced by Steven Luatua, whose place on the bench was taken by Brian Alainu'uese, while the captaincy was transferred to Fritz Lee.

=== Argentina vs Chile ===
30 September 2023
15:00 CEST (UTC+2)

(1 BP) Argentina	59–5	Chile
Try: Sánchez 9' c González (2) 16' c, 68' c Creevy 23' c Bogado 46' c Isgro 64' c Ruiz 77' c S. Carreras 79' c Con: Sánchez (6/6) 10', 17', 24', 47', 65', 69'; S. Carreras (2/2) 78', 80+1'; Pen: Sánchez (1/1) 13'	Report	Try: Dussaillant 73' m

Stade de la Beaujoire, Nantes
Attendance: 33,963
Referee: Paul Williams (New Zealand)

Argentina	Chile

FB	15	Martín Bogado
RW	14	Rodrigo Isgro	(yellow card) 26'
OC	13	Lucio Cinti		12' to 23'
IC	12	Jerónimo de la Fuente (c)
LW	11	Juan Imhoff				(substituted off) 62'
FH	10	Nicolás Sánchez		(substituted off) 77'
SH	9	Tomás Cubelli		(substituted off) 47'
N8	8	Facundo Isa
OF	7	Marcos Kremer		(substituted off) 51'
BF	6	Juan Martín González
RL	5	Pedro Rubiolo
LL	4	Guido Petti		(substituted off) 62'
TP	3	Eduardo Bello		(substituted off) 47'
HK	2	Agustín Creevy		(substituted off) 55'
LP	1	Joel Sclavi		(substituted off) 62'
Replacements:
HK	16	Ignacio Ruiz		(substituted in) 55'
PR	17	Mayco Vivas		(substituted in) 62'
PR	18	Francisco Gómez Kodela		(substituted in) 47'
LK	19	Matías Alemanno		(substituted in) 51'
FL	20	Joaquín Oviedo		(substituted in) 62'
SH	21	Lautaro Bazán		(substituted in) 47'
FH	22	Santiago Carreras		(substituted in) 77'
FB	23	Juan Cruz Mallía		(substituted in) 12'	(substituted off) 23'	(substituted in) 62'
Coach:
(Australia) Michael Cheika

FB	15	Iñaki Ayarza	(substituted off) 65'
RW	14	Santiago Videla
OC	13	Domingo Saavedra
IC	12	Matías Garafulic
LW	11	José Larenas	(substituted off) 78'
FH	10	Rodrigo Fernández
SH	9	Marcelo Torrealba	(substituted off) 69'
N8	8	Raimundo Martínez
OF	7	Clemente Saavedra
BF	6	Martín Sigren (c)
RL	5	Javier Eissmann	(substituted off) 69'
LL	4	Santiago Pedrero	(substituted off) 62'
TP	3	Matías Dittus	(substituted off) 65'
HK	2	Augusto Böhme	(substituted off) 55'
LP	1	Javier Carrasco	(substituted off) 47'	(substituted in) 71'
Replacements:
HK	16	Tomás Dussaillant	(substituted in) 55'
PR	17	Salvador Lues	(substituted in) 47'	(substituted off) 71'
PR	18	Esteban Inostroza	(substituted in) 65'
LK	19	Augusto Sarmiento	(substituted in) 69'
FL	20	Alfonso Escobar	(substituted in) 78'
FL	21	Ignacio Silva	(substituted in) 62'
SH	22	Nicolás Herreros	(substituted in) 69'
FB	23	Francisco Urroz	(substituted in) 65'
Coach:
(Uruguay) Pablo Lemoine

Player of the Match:
Nicolás Sánchez (Argentina)

Assistant referees:
Andrew Brace (Ireland)
Chris Busby (Ireland)
Television match official:
Ben Whitehouse (Wales)

Notes:

- This was the first ever meeting between these two nations at a Rugby World Cup, and the first meeting between any two South American teams in the competition.
- Nicolás Sánchez became the second Argentine rugby player to earn 100 test caps.

=== England vs Samoa ===
7 October 2023
17:45 CEST (UTC+2)

England	18–17	Samoa (1 BP)
Try: Chessum 9' m Care 73' c Con: Farrell (1/2) 74'; Pen: Farrell (2/3) 18', 58'	Report	Try: Ah Wong (2) 22' c, 29' c Con: Sopoaga (2/2) 24', 30'; Pen: Sopoaga (1/2) 48'

Stade Pierre-Mauroy, Villeneuve-d'Ascq
Attendance: 47,891
Referee: Andrew Brace (Ireland)

England	Samoa

FB	15	Freddie Steward
RW	14	Joe Marchant
OC	13	Manu Tuilagi	(substituted off) 58'
IC	12	Owen Farrell (c)
LW	11	Jonny May
FH	10	George Ford	(substituted off) 51'
SH	9	Alex Mitchell	(substituted off) 66'
N8	8	Ben Earl
OF	7	Tom Curry	45' to 55'		(substituted off) 74'
BF	6	Courtney Lawes	(substituted off) 59'
RL	5	Ollie Chessum
LL	4	Maro Itoje
TP	3	Dan Cole	(substituted off) 48'
HK	2	Jamie George
LP	1	Ellis Genge	(substituted off) 55'
Replacements:
HK	16	Theo Dan
PR	17	Joe Marler	(substituted in) 55'
PR	18	Kyle Sinckler	(substituted in) 48'
LK	19	George Martin	(substituted in) 59'
N8	20	Billy Vunipola	(substituted in) 45'	(substituted off) 55'	(substituted in) 74'
SH	21	Danny Care	(substituted in) 66'
FH	22	Marcus Smith	(substituted in) 51'
CE	23	Ollie Lawrence	(substituted in) 58'
Coach:
(England) Steve Borthwick

FB	15	Duncan Paia'aua
RW	14	Nigel Ah Wong
OC	13	Tumua Manu	(yellow card) 66'
IC	12	Danny Toala		(substituted off) 65'
LW	11	Neria Fomai
FH	10	Lima Sopoaga
SH	9	Jonathan Taumateine		(substituted off) 62'
N8	8	Steven Luatua
OF	7	Fritz Lee		(substituted off) 62'
BF	6	Theo McFarland
RL	5	Brian Alainu'uese
LL	4	Sam Slade		(substituted off) 58'
TP	3	Michael Alaalatoa (c)		(substituted off) 58'
HK	2	Sama Malolo		(substituted off) 62'
LP	1	Jordan Lay		(substituted off) 58'
Replacements:
HK	16	Seilala Lam		(substituted in) 62'
PR	17	James Lay		(substituted in) 58'
PR	18	Paul Alo-Emile		(substituted in) 58'
N8	19	So'otala Fa'aso'o
FL	20	Alamanda Motuga		(substituted in) 62'
SH	21	Melani Matavao		(substituted in) 62'
FH	22	Christian Leali'ifano		(substituted in) 65'
FL	23	Miracle Faiʻilagi		(substituted in) 58'
Coach:
(Samoa) Seilala Mapusua

Player of the Match:
Lima Sopoaga (Samoa)

Assistant referees:
Nika Amashukeli (Georgia)
Chris Busby (Ireland)
Television match official:
Brian MacNeice (Ireland)

Notes:

- Owen Farrell became England's all-time top points scorer, breaking the previous record of 1,179 points which was held by Jonny Wilkinson.
- This was the only match at the 2023 Rugby World Cup in which the Player of the Match was selected from the losing team.

=== Japan vs Argentina ===
8 October 2023
13:00 CEST (UTC+2)

Japan	27–39	Argentina (1 BP)
Try: Fakatava 16' c Saitō 38' c Naikabula 65' c Con: Matsuda (3/3) 17', 39', 67'; Pen: Matsuda (1/1) 52'; Drop: Lemeki (1/1) 56'	Report	Try: Chocobares 2' c M. Carreras (3) 28' m, 46' c, 68' c Boffelli 58' c Con: Boffelli (3/4) 2', 47', 60'; Sánchez (1/1) 70'; Pen: Boffelli (1/2) 35'; Sánchez (1/1) 75'

Stade de la Beaujoire, Nantes
Attendance: 33,624
Referee: Ben O'Keeffe (New Zealand)

Japan	Argentina

FB	15	Lomano Lemeki
RW	14	Kotaro Matsushima		(substituted off) 60'
OC	13	Dylan Riley
IC	12	Ryōto Nakamura		(substituted off) 70'
LW	11	Siosaia Fifita
FH	10	Rikiya Matsuda
SH	9	Naoto Saitō
N8	8	Kazuki Himeno (c)
OF	7	Lappies Labuschagné	(yellow card) 23'	(substituted off) 70'
BF	6	Michael Leitch
RL	5	Amato Fakatava		(substituted off) 51'
LL	4	Jack Cornelsen
TP	3	Koo Ji-won		(substituted off) 43'
HK	2	Shōta Horie		(substituted off) 48'
LP	1	Keita Inagaki		(substituted off) 48'
Replacements:
HK	16	Atsushi Sakate		(substituted in) 48'
PR	17	Craig Millar		(substituted in) 48'
PR	18	Asaeli Ai Valu		(substituted in) 43'
LK	19	Warner Dearns		(substituted in) 51'
LK	20	Amanaki Saumaki		(substituted in) 70'
SH	21	Kenta Fukuda
CE	22	Ryohei Yamanaka		(substituted in) 70'
WG	23	Jone Naikabula		(substituted in) 60'
Coach:
(New Zealand) Jamie Joseph

FB	15	Juan Cruz Mallía
RW	14	Emiliano Boffelli
OC	13	Lucio Cinti	(substituted off) 70'
IC	12	Santiago Chocobares
LW	11	Mateo Carreras
FH	10	Santiago Carreras	(substituted off) 59'
SH	9	Gonzalo Bertranou	(substituted off) 59'
N8	8	Juan Martín González
OF	7	Marcos Kremer
BF	6	Pablo Matera	(substituted off) 24'
RL	5	Tomás Lavanini	(substituted off) 48'
LL	4	Guido Petti
TP	3	Francisco Gómez Kodela	(substituted off) 43'	(substituted in) 70'
HK	2	Julián Montoya (c)	(substituted off) 78'
LP	1	Thomas Gallo	(substituted off) 67'
Replacements:
HK	16	Agustín Creevy	(substituted in) 78'
PR	17	Joel Sclavi	(substituted in) 67'
PR	18	Eduardo Bello	(substituted in) 43'	(substituted off) 70'
LK	19	Matías Alemanno	(substituted in) 24'
LK	20	Pedro Rubiolo	(substituted in) 48'
SH	21	Lautaro Bazán	(substituted in) 59'
FH	22	Nicolás Sánchez	(substituted in) 59'
CE	23	Matías Moroni	(substituted in) 70'
Coach:
(Australia) Michael Cheika

Player of the Match:
Mateo Carreras (Argentina)

Assistant referees:
Paul Williams (New Zealand)
James Doleman (New Zealand)
Television match official:
Brendon Pickerill (New Zealand)
