= Chile at the Rugby World Cup =

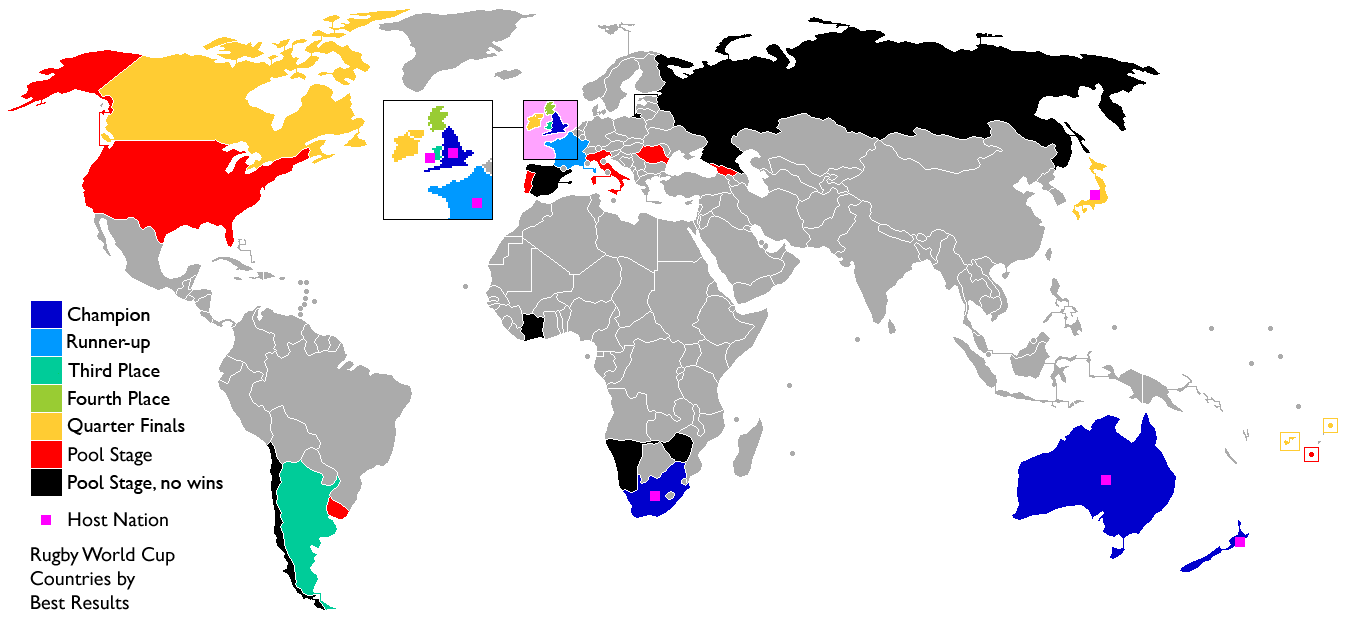
Map of nations best results, excluding nations which unsuccessfully participated in qualifying tournaments.

Chile qualified for their first Rugby World Cup on their 8th attempt and appeared at the 2023 tournament.

Nation	Number of appearances	First appearance	Most recent appearance	Streak	Best result
Chile	1	2023	2023	1	Group Stage

== By position ==
Rugby World Cup record										Qualification						
Year	Round	Pld	W	D	L	PF	PA	Squad	Head coach	Pos	Pld	W	D	L	PF	PA
(New Zealand) (Australia) 1987	Not invited									Not invited						
(England) (France) (Ireland) (Scotland) (Wales) 1991	Did not enter									Did not enter						
(South Africa) 1995	Did not qualify									4th	3	0	0	3	37	109
(Wales) 1999	Did not qualify									2nd	4	3	0	1	168	40
(Australia) 2003	Did not qualify									4th	8	4	0	4	196	155
(France) 2007	Did not qualify									3rd	4	2	0	2	121	138
(New Zealand) 2011	Did not qualify									2nd	2	1	0	1	88	49
(England) 2015	Did not qualify									2nd	4	2	0	2	92	78
(Japan) 2019	Did not qualify									2nd	6	3	1	2	194	110
(France) 2023	Pool stage	4	0	0	4	27	215	Squad	P. Lemoine	2nd	6	3	0	3	139	125
(Australia) 2027	To be determined									To be determined						
(United States) 2031	To be determined									To be determined						
Total	—	4	0	0	4	27	215	—	—	—	37	18	1	18	1035	804
Champions; Runners–up; Third place; Fourth place; Home venue

== By match ==
=== 2023 Rugby World Cup ===
Pool D games –

Pos	Team	Pld	W	D	L	PF	PA	PD	TF	TA	B	Pts	Qualification
1	England	4	4	0	0	150	39	+111	17	3	2	18	Advance to knockout stage, and qualification to the 2027 Rugby World Cup
2	Argentina	4	3	0	1	127	69	+58	15	5	2	14	Advance to knockout stage, and qualification to the 2027 Rugby World Cup
3	Japan	4	2	0	2	109	107	+2	12	14	1	9	Qualification to the 2027 Rugby World Cup
4	Samoa	4	1	0	3	92	75	+17	11	7	3	7	
5	Chile	4	0	0	4	27	215	−188	4	30	0	0	

Source: World Rugby
Rules for classification: Pool stage tiebreakers

10 September 2023
13:00 CEST (UTC+2)

(1 BP) Japan	42–12	Chile
Try: Fakatava (2) 8' c, 40+1' c Naikabula 30' c Leitch 53' c Nakamura 71' c Dearns 79' c Con: Matsuda (6/6) 10', 31', 40+2', 54', 73', 80+1'	Report	Try: Fernández 6' c A. Escobar 48' m Con: Videla (1/2) 7'

Stadium de Toulouse, Toulouse
Attendance: 30,187
Referee: Nic Berry (Australia)

Japan	Chile

FB	15	Semisi Masirewa		(substituted off) 56'
RW	14	Kotaro Matsushima
OC	13	Dylan Riley	(yellow card) 46'
IC	12	Ryōto Nakamura
LW	11	Jone Naikabula		(substituted off) 63'
FH	10	Rikiya Matsuda
SH	9	Yutaka Nagare (c)		(substituted off) 61'
N8	8	Jack Cornelsen
OF	7	Kanji Shimokawa		(substituted off) 50'
BF	6	Michael Leitch
RL	5	Amato Fakatava		(substituted off) 55'
LL	4	Amanaki Saumaki
TP	3	Koo Ji-won
HK	2	Atsushi Sakate		(substituted off) 50'
LP	1	Keita Inagaki		(substituted off) 58'
Replacements:
HK	16	Shōta Horie		(substituted in) 50'
PR	17	Craig Millar		(substituted in) 58'
PR	18	Asaeli Ai Valu
LK	19	Warner Dearns		(substituted in) 55'
FL	20	Shota Fukui		(substituted in) 50'
SH	21	Naoto Saitō		(substituted in) 61'
CE	22	Tomoki Osada		(substituted in) 63'
WG	23	Lomano Lemeki		(substituted in) 56'
Coach:
(New Zealand) Jamie Joseph

FB	15	Iñaki Ayarza
RW	14	Santiago Videla
OC	13	Domingo Saavedra
IC	12	Nicolás Garafulic
LW	11	Franco Velarde		(substituted off) 29'	(substituted in) 35'	(substituted off) 56'
FH	10	Rodrigo Fernández
SH	9	Marcelo Torrealba
N8	8	Alfonso Escobar
OF	7	Raimundo Martínez		(substituted off) 58'
BF	6	Martín Sigren (c)	(yellow card) 37'
RL	5	Javier Eissman		(substituted off) 56'
LL	4	Clemente Saavedra		(substituted off) 65'
TP	3	Matías Dittus	(yellow card) 24'			(substituted off) 68'
HK	2	Diego Escobar		(substituted off) 58'
LP	1	Javier Carrasco
Replacements:
HK	16	Augusto Böhme		(substituted in) 58'
PR	17	Salvador Lues
PR	18	Iñaki Gurruchaga		(substituted in) 29'	(substituted off) 35'	(substituted in) 68'
LK	19	Pablo Huete		(substituted in) 65'
LK	20	Santiago Pedrero		(substituted in) 56'
FL	21	Ignacio Silva		(substituted in) 58'
SH	22	Lukas Carvallo
CE	23	José Ignacio Larenas				(substituted in) 56'
Coach:
(Uruguay) Pablo Lemoine

Player of the Match:
Amato Fakatava (Japan)

Assistant referees:
Karl Dickson (England)
Andrea Piardi (Italy)
Television match official:
Tom Foley (England)

Notes:

- This was the first ever meeting between these two nations.
- This was Chile's first game at a Rugby World Cup.
- Keita Inagaki (Japan) earned his 50th test cap.
- Kazuki Himeno was originally named in the starting line-up for Japan, but withdrew prior to the match due to a calf injury. He was replaced in the back row by Jack Cornelsen, whose initial position in the second row was taken by Amanaki Saumaki, while the captaincy was handed over to Yutaka Nagare.

16 September 2023
15:00 CEST (UTC+2)

(1 BP) Samoa	43–10	Chile
Try: Paia'aua 40+1' c Taumateine 42' m Lee 47' m Malolo (2) 52' c, 80+1' c Con: Leali'ifano (2/4) 40+2', 53'; Sopoaga (1/1) 80+2'; Pen: Leali'ifano (4/4) 4', 10', 14', 36'	Report	Try: Dittus 6' c Con: Videla (1/1) 7'; Pen: Garafulic (1/1) 30'

Nouveau Stade de Bordeaux, Bordeaux
Attendance: 39,291
Referee: Paul Williams (New Zealand)

Samoa	Chile

FB	15	Duncan Paia'aua
RW	14	Danny Toala		(substituted off) 64'
OC	13	Ulupano Seuteni	(yellow card) 6'
IC	12	Tumua Manu		(substituted off) 56'
LW	11	Nigel Ah Wong
FH	10	Christian Leali'ifano
SH	9	Jonathan Taumateine		(substituted off) 54'
N8	8	Steve Luatua		(substituted off) 58'
OF	7	Fritz Lee
BF	6	Taleni Seu
RL	5	Theo McFarland
LL	4	Chris Vui		(substituted off) 58'
TP	3	Michael Alaalatoa (c)		(substituted off) 54'
HK	2	Seilala Lam		(substituted off) 41'
LP	1	James Lay		(substituted off) 54'
Replacements:
HK	16	Sama Malolo		(substituted in) 41'
PR	17	Jordan Lay		(substituted in) 54'
PR	18	Paul Alo-Emile		(substituted in) 54'
LK	19	Sam Slade		(substituted in) 58'
FL	20	Jordan Taufua		(substituted in) 58'
SH	21	Ere Enari	(yellow card) 64'	(substituted in) 54'
FH	22	Lima Sopoaga		(substituted in) 56'
WG	23	Ed Fidow		(substituted in) 64'
Coach:
(Samoa) Seilala Mapusua

FB	15	Iñaki Ayarza
RW	14	Santiago Videla		(substituted off) 22'
OC	13	Domingo Saavedra
IC	12	Matías Garafulic
LW	11	José Larenas
FH	10	Rodrigo Fernández
SH	9	Marcelo Torrealba		(substituted off) 62'
N8	8	Raimundo Martínez		(substituted off) 41'
OF	7	Clemente Saavedra			(substituted off) 74'
BF	6	Martín Sigren (c)
RL	5	Santiago Pedrero		(substituted off) 54'
LL	4	Pablo Huete		(substituted off) 41'
TP	3	Matías Dittus		(substituted off) 70'	(substituted in) 74'
HK	2	Tomás Dussaillant		(substituted off) 41'	(substituted in) 64'
LP	1	Javier Carrasco		(substituted off) 41'
Replacements:
HK	16	Diego Escobar		(substituted in) 41'	(substituted off) 64'
PR	17	Salvador Lues		(substituted in) 41'
PR	18	Esteban Inostroza	(yellow card) 71'	(substituted in) 70'
LK	19	Javier Eissman		(substituted in) 41'
FL	20	Alfonso Escobar	(yellow card) 63'	(substituted in) 41'
FL	21	Ignacio Silva		(substituted in) 54'
SH	22	Benjamín Videla		(substituted in) 62'
CE	23	Pablo Casas		(substituted in) 22'
Coach:
(Uruguay) Pablo Lemoine

Player of the Match:
Theo McFarland (Samoa)

Assistant referees:
Angus Gardner (Australia)
James Doleman (New Zealand)
Television match official:
Brett Cronan (Australia)

Notes:

- This was the first ever meeting between these two nations.
- Benjamín Videla (Chile) made his international debut.

23 September 2023
17:45 CEST (UTC+2)

(1 BP) England	71–0	Chile
Try: Arundell (5) 20' m, 30' m, 48' c, 60' c, 69' m Dan (2) 24' c, 45' c Rodd 35' c Smith (2) 40' c, 77' c Willis 80' c Con: Farrell (8/11) 25', 36', 40+2', 46', 49', 62', 78', 80+1'	Report

Stade Pierre-Mauroy, Villeneuve-d'Ascq
Attendance: 44,315
Referee: Jaco Peyper (South Africa)

England	Chile

FB	15	Marcus Smith
RW	14	Henry Arundell
OC	13	Elliot Daly	(substituted off) 50'
IC	12	Ollie Lawrence
LW	11	Max Malins	(substituted off) 71'
FH	10	Owen Farrell (c)
SH	9	Danny Care	(substituted off) 50'
N8	8	Billy Vunipola	(substituted off) 67'
OF	7	Jack Willis
BF	6	Lewis Ludlam	(substituted off) 55'
RL	5	George Martin
LL	4	David Ribbans
TP	3	Kyle Sinckler	(substituted off) 55'
HK	2	Theo Dan	(substituted off) 55'
LP	1	Bevan Rodd	(substituted off) 55'
Replacements:
HK	16	Jack Walker	(substituted in) 55'
PR	17	Joe Marler	(substituted in) 55'
PR	18	Will Stuart	(substituted in) 55'
LK	19	Ollie Chessum	(substituted in) 55'
FL	20	Ben Earl	(substituted in) 67'
SH	21	Ben Youngs	(substituted in) 50'
FH	22	George Ford	(substituted in) 50'
CE	23	Joe Marchant	(substituted in) 71'
Coach:
(England) Steve Borthwick

FB	15	Francisco Urroz
RW	14	Cristobal Game
OC	13	Domingo Saavedra
IC	12	Matías Garafulic		(substituted off) 78'
LW	11	Franco Velarde		(substituted off) 63'
FH	10	Rodrigo Fernández
SH	9	Benjamín Videla
N8	8	Alfonso Escobar		(substituted off) 63'
OF	7	Ignacio Silva		(substituted off) 41'
BF	6	Martín Sigren (c)
RL	5	Javier Eissman		(substituted off) 62'
LL	4	Clemente Saavedra
TP	3	Matías Dittus	(yellow card) 44'	(substituted off) 63'	(substituted in) 77'
HK	2	Augusto Böhme		(substituted off) 56'
LP	1	Salvador Lues		(substituted off) 56'
Replacements:
HK	16	Tomás Dussaillant		(substituted in) 56'
PR	17	Vittorio Lastra		(substituted in) 56'
PR	18	Iñaki Gurruchaga		(substituted in) 63'	(substituted off) 77'
LK	19	Pablo Huete		(substituted in) 62'
FL	20	Thomas Orchard		(substituted in) 63'
FL	21	Raimundo Martínez		(substituted in) 41'
SH	22	Lukas Carvallo		(substituted in) 78'
FB	23	Iñaki Ayarza		(substituted in) 63'
Coach:
(Uruguay) Pablo Lemoine

Player of the Match:
Henry Arundell (England)

Assistant referees:
Pierre Brousset (France)
Andrea Piardi (Italy)
Television match official:
Marius Jonker (South Africa)

Notes:

- This was the first ever meeting between these two nations.
- England recorded their first ever clean sheet in a World Cup match.
- With five tries, Henry Arundell equalled the England record for most tries scored by one player in a test match (shared with Douglas Lambert, Josh Lewsey and Rory Underwood).

30 September 2023
15:00 CEST (UTC+2)

(1 BP) Argentina	59–5	Chile
Try: Sánchez 9' c González (2) 16' c, 68' c Creevy 23' c Bogado 46' c Isgro 64' c Ruiz 77' c S. Carreras 79' c Con: Sánchez (6/6) 10', 17', 24', 47', 65', 69'; S. Carreras (2/2) 78', 80+1'; Pen: Sánchez (1/1) 13'	Report	Try: Dussaillant 73' m

Stade de la Beaujoire, Nantes
Attendance: 33,963
Referee: Paul Williams (New Zealand)

Argentina	Chile

FB	15	Martín Bogado
RW	14	Rodrigo Isgro	(yellow card) 26'
OC	13	Lucio Cinti		12' to 23'
IC	12	Jerónimo de la Fuente (c)
LW	11	Juan Imhoff				(substituted off) 62'
FH	10	Nicolás Sánchez		(substituted off) 77'
SH	9	Tomás Cubelli		(substituted off) 47'
N8	8	Facundo Isa
OF	7	Marcos Kremer		(substituted off) 51'
BF	6	Juan Martín González
RL	5	Pedro Rubiolo
LL	4	Guido Petti		(substituted off) 62'
TP	3	Eduardo Bello		(substituted off) 47'
HK	2	Agustín Creevy		(substituted off) 55'
LP	1	Joel Sclavi		(substituted off) 62'
Replacements:
HK	16	Ignacio Ruiz		(substituted in) 55'
PR	17	Mayco Vivas		(substituted in) 62'
PR	18	Francisco Gómez Kodela		(substituted in) 47'
LK	19	Matías Alemanno		(substituted in) 51'
FL	20	Joaquín Oviedo		(substituted in) 62'
SH	21	Lautaro Bazán		(substituted in) 47'
FH	22	Santiago Carreras		(substituted in) 77'
FB	23	Juan Cruz Mallía		(substituted in) 12'	(substituted off) 23'	(substituted in) 62'
Coach:
(Australia) Michael Cheika

FB	15	Iñaki Ayarza	(substituted off) 65'
RW	14	Santiago Videla
OC	13	Domingo Saavedra
IC	12	Matías Garafulic
LW	11	José Larenas	(substituted off) 78'
FH	10	Rodrigo Fernández
SH	9	Marcelo Torrealba	(substituted off) 69'
N8	8	Raimundo Martínez
OF	7	Clemente Saavedra
BF	6	Martín Sigren (c)
RL	5	Javier Eissman	(substituted off) 69'
LL	4	Santiago Pedrero	(substituted off) 62'
TP	3	Matías Dittus	(substituted off) 65'
HK	2	Augusto Böhme	(substituted off) 55'
LP	1	Javier Carrasco	(substituted off) 47'	(substituted in) 71'
Replacements:
HK	16	Tomás Dussaillant	(substituted in) 55'
PR	17	Salvador Lues	(substituted in) 47'	(substituted off) 71'
PR	18	Esteban Inostroza	(substituted in) 65'
LK	19	Augusto Sarmiento	(substituted in) 69'
FL	20	Alfonso Escobar	(substituted in) 78'
FL	21	Ignacio Silva	(substituted in) 62'
SH	22	Nicolás Herreros	(substituted in) 69'
FB	23	Francisco Urroz	(substituted in) 65'
Coach:
(Uruguay) Pablo Lemoine

Player of the Match:
Nicolás Sánchez (Argentina)

Assistant referees:
Andrew Brace (Ireland)
Chris Busby (Ireland)
Television match official:
Ben Whitehouse (Wales)

Notes:

- This was the first ever meeting between these two nations at a Rugby World Cup, and the first meeting between any two South American teams in the competition.
- Nicolás Sánchez became the second Argentine rugby player to earn 100 test caps.

== See also ==
- National team appearances in the Rugby World Cup
