= 2023 Rugby World Cup statistics =

Stats for 2023 Rugby World Cup

This article documents the statistics of the 2023 Rugby World Cup that was held in France from 8 September to 28 October.

== Team statistics ==
The following table shows the team's results in major statistical categories.

Team statistics
Team	Played	Won	Drawn	Lost	Points for	Points against	Points diff	Tries	Conversions	Penalties	Drop goals	Yellow card	Red card
Argentina	7	4	0	3	185	156	+29	19	18	18	0	2	0
Australia	4	2	0	2	90	91	−1	11	7	7	0	3	0
Chile	4	0	0	4	27	215	−188	4	2	1	0	5	0
England	7	6	0	1	221	102	+119	21	16	23	5	0	1
Fiji	5	2	0	3	112	113	−1	12	11	11	0	5	0
France	5	4	0	1	238	61	+177	30	25	12	0	1	0
Georgia	4	0	1	3	64	113	−49	7	4	7	0	2	0
Ireland	5	4	0	1	214	74	+140	30	25	4	0	1	0
Italy	4	2	0	2	114	181	−67	15	15	3	0	2	0
Japan	4	2	0	2	109	107	+2	12	11	8	1	3	0
Namibia	4	0	0	4	37	255	−218	3	2	6	0	4	2
New Zealand	7	5	0	2	336	89	+247	49	35	7	0	5	2
Portugal	4	1	1	2	64	103	−39	8	6	4	0	2	1
Romania	4	0	0	4	32	287	−255	4	3	2	0	5	0
Samoa	4	1	0	3	92	75	+17	11	8	7	0	5	1
Scotland	4	2	0	2	146	71	+75	21	19	1	0	1	0
South Africa	7	6	0	1	208	88	+120	27	19	11	0	3	0
Tonga	4	1	0	3	96	177	−81	13	8	5	0	2	1
Uruguay	4	1	0	3	65	164	−99	9	6	1	1	2	0
Wales	5	4	0	1	160	88	+72	19	16	10	1	3	0

Last updated: 28 October 2023

== Try scorers ==
8 tries

- (New Zealand) Will Jordan

6 tries

- (France) Damian Penaud

5 tries

- (England) Henry Arundell
- (Ireland) Bundee Aki
- (New Zealand) Leicester Fainga'anuku
- (New Zealand) Damian McKenzie
- (Scotland) Darcy Graham
- (Wales) Louis Rees-Zammit

4 tries

- (France) Louis Bielle-Biarrey
- (New Zealand) Aaron Smith
- (South Africa) Cobus Reinach

3 tries

- (Argentina) Mateo Carreras
- (England) Theo Dan
- (France) Peato Mauvaka
- (Ireland) Tadhg Beirne
- (Ireland) Hugo Keenan
- (Ireland) Johnny Sexton
- (Japan) Amato Fakatava
- (New Zealand) Cam Roigard
- (New Zealand) Ardie Savea
- (New Zealand) Mark Tele'a
- (Samoa) Sama Malolo
- (South Africa) Makazole Mapimpi
- (Tonga) Solomone Kata
- (Uruguay) Baltazar Amaya

2 tries

- (Argentina) Emiliano Boffelli
- (Argentina) Santiago Carreras
- (Argentina) Juan Martín González
- (Argentina) Nicolás Sánchez
- (Australia) Ben Donaldson
- (Australia) Mark Nawaqanitawase
- (England) Joe Marchant
- (England) Marcus Smith
- (Fiji) Mesake Doge
- (Fiji) Waisea Nayacalevu
- (Fiji) Josua Tuisova
- (France) Cyril Baille
- (France) Jonathan Danty
- (France) Melvyn Jaminet
- (France) Yoram Moefana
- (France) Charles Ollivon
- (Ireland) Jamison Gibson-Park
- (Ireland) Mack Hansen
- (Ireland) Rob Herring
- (Ireland) James Lowe
- (Ireland) Peter O'Mahony
- (Italy) Lorenzo Cannone
- (Italy) Ange Capuozzo
- (Italy) Monty Ioane
- (Italy) Manuel Zuliani
- (Japan) Michael Leitch
- (Japan) Jone Naikabula
- (Namibia) Gerswin Mouton
- (New Zealand) Dane Coles
- (New Zealand) Shannon Frizell
- (New Zealand) Anton Lienert-Brown
- (New Zealand) Dalton Papalii
- (Portugal) Raffaele Storti
- (Samoa) Nigel Ah Wong
- (Samoa) Duncan Paia'aua
- (Scotland) Rory Darge
- (Scotland) Ali Price
- (South Africa) Kurt-Lee Arendse
- (South Africa) Deon Fourie
- (South Africa) Cheslin Kolbe
- (South Africa) Willie le Roux
- (South Africa) Grant Williams
- (Tonga) Ben Tameifuna
- (Uruguay) Nicolás Freitas
- (Wales) Jac Morgan
- (Wales) George North

1 try

- (Argentina) Martín Bogado
- (Argentina) Rodrigo Bruni
- (Argentina) Santiago Chocobares
- (Argentina) Agustín Creevy
- (Argentina) Tomás Cubelli
- (Argentina) Rodrigo Isgro
- (Argentina) Ignacio Ruiz
- (Argentina) Joel Sclavi
- (Australia) Richie Arnold
- (Australia) Angus Bell
- (Australia) Marika Koroibete
- (Australia) Fraser McReight
- (Australia) Jordan Petaia
- (Australia) Dave Porecki
- (Australia) Suliasi Vunivalu
- (Chile) Matías Dittus
- (Chile) Tomás Dussaillant
- (Chile) Alfonso Escobar
- (Chile) Rodrigo Fernández
- (England) Danny Care
- (England) Ollie Chessum
- (England) Ben Earl
- (England) Courtney Lawes
- (England) Lewis Ludlam
- (England) Bevan Rodd
- (England) Freddie Steward
- (England) Manu Tuilagi
- (England) Jack Willis
- (Fiji) Vilimoni Botitu
- (Fiji) Vinaya Habosi
- (Fiji) Viliame Mata
- (Fiji) Peni Ravai
- (Fiji) Lekima Tagitagivalu
- (France) Baptiste Couilloud
- (France) Antoine Dupont
- (France) Thibaud Flament
- (France) Antoine Hastoy
- (France) Matthieu Jalibert
- (France) Thomas Ramos
- (Georgia (country)) Beka Gigashvili
- (Georgia (country)) Luka Ivanishvili
- (Georgia (country)) Vano Karkadze
- (Georgia (country)) Davit Niniashvili
- (Georgia (country)) Merab Sharikadze
- (Georgia (country)) Akaki Tabutsadze
- (Georgia (country)) Tengiz Zamtaradze
- (Ireland) Caelan Doris
- (Ireland) Iain Henderson
- (Ireland) Joe McCarthy
- (Ireland) Garry Ringrose
- (Ireland) Dan Sheehan
- (Italy) Juan Ignacio Brex
- (Italy) Hame Faiva
- (Italy) Paolo Garbisi
- (Italy) Michele Lamaro
- (Italy) Dino Lamb
- (Italy) Paolo Odogwu
- (Italy) Lorenzo Pani
- (Japan) Warner Dearns
- (Japan) Kazuki Himeno
- (Japan) Lappies Labuschagné
- (Japan) Ryōto Nakamura
- (Japan) Naoto Saitō
- (Namibia) J. C. Greyling
- (New Zealand) Beauden Barrett
- (New Zealand) Jordie Barrett
- (New Zealand) Caleb Clarke
- (New Zealand) Ethan de Groot
- (New Zealand) David Havili
- (New Zealand) Rieko Ioane
- (New Zealand) Richie Mo'unga
- (New Zealand) Fletcher Newell
- (New Zealand) Brodie Retallick
- (New Zealand) Tamaiti Williams
- (Portugal) Pedro Bettencourt
- (Portugal) Nicolas Martins
- (Portugal) Rafael Simões
- (Romania) Cristi Boboc
- (Romania) Gabriel Rupanu
- (Romania) Marius Simionescu
- (Romania) Florin Surugiu
- (Samoa) Seilala Lam
- (Samoa) Christian Leali'ifano
- (Samoa) Fritz Lee
- (Samoa) Jonathan Taumateine
- (Scotland) Ewan Ashman
- (Scotland) Matt Fagerson
- (Scotland) Chris Harris
- (Scotland) Ben Healy
- (Scotland) George Horne
- (Scotland) Blair Kinghorn
- (Scotland) Johnny Matthews
- (Scotland) Ollie Smith
- (Scotland) Kyle Steyn
- (Scotland) George Turner
- (Scotland) Duhan van der Merwe
- (Scotland) Hamish Watson
- (South Africa) Damian de Allende
- (South Africa) Pieter-Steph du Toit
- (South Africa) Eben Etzebeth
- (South Africa) Jesse Kriel
- (South Africa) Canan Moodie
- (South Africa) Kwagga Smith
- (South Africa) RG Snyman
- (South Africa) Marco van Staden
- (South Africa) Damian Willemse
- (Tonga) Pita Ahki
- (Tonga) Vaea Fifita
- (Tonga) Fine Inisi
- (Tonga) George Moala
- (Tonga) Patrick Pellegrini
- (Tonga) Kyren Taumoefolau
- (Tonga) Afusipa Taumoepeau
- (Tonga) Sione Vailanu
- (Uruguay) Santiago Arata
- (Uruguay) Bautista Basso
- (Uruguay) Germán Kessler
- (Wales) Josh Adams
- (Wales) Dan Biggar
- (Wales) Gareth Davies
- (Wales) Elliot Dee
- (Wales) Taulupe Faletau
- (Wales) Tomas Francis
- (Wales) Dewi Lake
- (Wales) Nick Tompkins
- (Wales) Liam Williams
- (Wales) Tomos Williams

== Conversion scorers ==
21 conversions

- (France) Thomas Ramos

18 conversions

- (New Zealand) Richie Mo'unga

17 conversions

- (Ireland) Johnny Sexton

14 conversions

- (Italy) Tommaso Allan
- (New Zealand) Damian McKenzie

12 conversions

- (England) Owen Farrell

11 conversions

- (Japan) Rikiya Matsuda
- (Scotland) Ben Healy

9 conversions

- (Argentina) Emiliano Boffelli

8 conversions

- (Tonga) William Havili

7 conversions

- (Argentina) Nicolás Sánchez
- (Australia) Ben Donaldson
- (Scotland) Finn Russell

6 conversions

- (South Africa) Handré Pollard
- (Wales) Sam Costelow

5 conversions

- (Fiji) Frank Lomani
- (South Africa) Manie Libbok
- (South Africa) Damian Willemse
- (Uruguay) Felipe Etcheverry

4 conversions

- (England) George Ford
- (France) Melvyn Jaminet
- (Ireland) Ross Byrne
- (Ireland) Jack Crowley
- (Samoa) Christian Leali'ifano
- (Wales) Dan Biggar

3 conversions

- (Fiji) Simione Kuruvoli
- (Portugal) Samuel Marques
- (Romania) Alin Conache
- (Samoa) Lima Sopoaga
- (South Africa) Faf de Klerk
- (Wales) Leigh Halfpenny

2 conversions

- (Argentina) Santiago Carreras
- (Chile) Santiago Videla
- (Georgia (country)) Tedo Abzhandadze
- (Georgia (country)) Luka Matkava
- (Namibia) Tiaan Swanepoel
- (New Zealand) Beauden Barrett

1 conversion

- (Fiji) Teti Tela
- (Italy) Paolo Garbisi
- (New Zealand) Jordie Barrett
- (Samoa) D'Angelo Leuila
- (Scotland) George Horne
- (Uruguay) Felipe Berchesi
- (Wales) Gareth Anscombe

== Penalty goal scorers ==
15 penalties

- (England) Owen Farrell

13 penalties

- (Argentina) Emiliano Boffelli

9 penalties

- (France) Thomas Ramos

8 penalties

- (England) George Ford
- (Japan) Rikiya Matsuda

7 penalties

- (Australia) Ben Donaldson
- (South Africa) Handré Pollard

6 penalties

- (Namibia) Tiaan Swanepoel
- (Wales) Gareth Anscombe

5 penalties

- (New Zealand) Richie Mo'unga
- (Samoa) Christian Leali'ifano
- (Tonga) William Havili

4 penalties

- (Argentina) Nicolás Sánchez
- (Fiji) Simione Kuruvoli
- (South Africa) Manie Libbok

3 penalties

- (France) Melvyn Jaminet
- (Fiji) Frank Lomani
- (Georgia (country)) Luka Matkava
- (Ireland) Johnny Sexton
- (Portugal) Samuel Marques

2 penalties

- (Georgia (country)) Tedo Abzhandadze
- (Georgia (country)) Davit Niniashvili
- (Italy) Tommaso Allan
- (New Zealand) Jordie Barrett
- (Wales) Dan Biggar

1 penalty

- (Chile) Matías Garafulic
- (Ireland) Jack Crowley
- (Italy) Paolo Garbisi
- (Romania) Alin Conache
- (Romania) Gabriel Rupanu
- (Samoa) D'Angelo Leuila
- (Samoa) Lima Sopoaga
- (Scotland) Finn Russell
- (Uruguay) Felipe Berchesi
- (Wales) Sam Costelow

== Drop goal scorers ==
3 drop goals

- (England) George Ford

2 drop goals

- (England) Owen Farrell

1 drop goal

- (Japan) Lomano Lemeki
- (Uruguay) Felipe Etcheverry
- (Wales) Gareth Anscombe

== Top point scorers ==
Top 10 points scorers
Player	Team	Total	Details						
Player	Team	Total				Tries	Conversions	Penalties	Drop goals
Owen Farrell	England	75	0	12	15	2			
Thomas Ramos	France	74	1	21	9	0			
Emiliano Boffelli	Argentina	67	2	9	13	0			
Johnny Sexton	Ireland	58	3	17	3	0			
Richie Mo'unga	New Zealand	56	1	18	5	0			
Damian McKenzie	New Zealand	53	5	14	0	0			
Rikiya Matsuda	Japan	46	0	11	8	0			
Ben Donaldson	Australia	45	2	7	7	0			
George Ford	England	41	0	4	8	3			
Will Jordan	New Zealand	40	8	0	0	0			

== Scoring ==
=== Timing ===
- First try of the tournament: Mark Tele'a for New Zealand against France
- First brace of the tournament: Johnny Sexton for Ireland against Romania
- First hat-trick of the tournament (drop goals): George Ford for England against Argentina
- First hat-trick of the tournament (tries): Cobus Reinach for South Africa against Romania

== Hat-tricks ==
Unless otherwise noted, players in this list scored a hat-trick of tries.

Rank	Player	Team	Opponent	Stage	Result	Venue	Date
1	George Ford^{D3}	England	Argentina	Pool	27–10	Stade Vélodrome	9 September 2023
2	Cobus Reinach	South Africa	Romania	Pool	76–0	Nouveau Stade de Bordeaux	17 September 2023
3	Makazole Mapimpi	South Africa	Romania	Pool	76–0	Nouveau Stade de Bordeaux	17 September 2023
4	Damian Penaud	France	Namibia	Pool	96–0	Stade Vélodrome	21 September 2023
5	Henry Arundell^{T5}	England	Chile	Pool	71–0	Stade Pierre-Mauroy	23 September 2023
6	Aaron Smith	New Zealand	Italy	Pool	96–17	Parc Olympique Lyonnais	29 September 2023
7	Darcy Graham^{T4}	Scotland	Romania	Pool	84–0	Stade Pierre-Mauroy	30 September 2023
8	Leicester Fainga'anuku	New Zealand	Uruguay	Pool	73–0	Parc Olympique Lyonnais	5 October 2023
9	Louis Rees-Zammit	Wales	Georgia	Pool	43–19	Stade de la Beaujoire	7 October 2023
10	Mateo Carreras	Argentina	Japan	Pool	39–27	Stade de la Beaujoire	8 October 2023
11	Will Jordan	New Zealand	Argentina	Semi Final	44–6	Stade de France	20 October 2023

Key
^{D3}	Scored hat-trick of drop goals
^{T4}	Scored 4 tries
^{T5}	Scored 5 tries

== Player of the match awards ==
Awards	Player	Team	Opponent	Ref
2	Emiliano Boffelli	Argentina	Samoa^{PM}, Wales^{QF}	
2	George Ford	England	Argentina^{PM}, Japan^{PM}	
2	Grégory Alldritt	France	New Zealand^{PM}, Italy^{PM}	
2	Bundee Aki	Ireland	Tonga^{PM}, South Africa^{PM}	
2	Ardie Savea	New Zealand	Italy^{PM}, Ireland^{QF}	
1	Mateo Carreras	Argentina	Japan^{PM}	
1	Nicolás Sánchez	Argentina	Chile^{PM}	
1	Ben Donaldson	Australia	Georgia^{PM}	
1	Rob Valetini	Australia	Portugal^{PM}	
1	Henry Arundell	England	Chile^{PM}	
1	Owen Farrell	England	Fiji^{QF}	
1	Sam Underhill	England	Argentina^{BF}	
1	Levani Botia	Fiji	Georgia^{PM}	
1	Josua Tuisova	Fiji	Australia^{PM}	
1	Maxime Lucu	France	Uruguay^{PM}	
1	Damian Penaud	France	Namibia^{PM}	
1	Peter O'Mahony	Ireland	Romania^{PM}	
1	Jamison Gibson-Park	Ireland	Scotland^{PM}	
1	Lorenzo Cannone	Italy	Namibia^{PM}	
1	Michele Lamaro	Italy	Uruguay^{PM}	
1	Amato Fakatava	Japan	Chile^{PM}	
1	Lomano Lemeki	Japan	Samoa^{PM}	
1	Jordie Barrett	New Zealand	Argentina^{SF}	
1	Damian McKenzie	New Zealand	Uruguay^{PM}	
1	Cam Roigard	New Zealand	Namibia^{PM}	
1	Nicolas Martins	Portugal	Fiji^{PM}	
1	Jerónimo Portela	Portugal	Georgia^{PM}	
1	Theo McFarland	Samoa	Chile^{PM}	
1	Lima Sopoaga	Samoa	England^{PM}	
1	Pieter-Steph du Toit	South Africa	New Zealand^{F}	
1	Deon Fourie	South Africa	Tonga^{PM}	
1	Manie Libbok	South Africa	Scotland^{PM}	
1	Makazole Mapimpi	South Africa	Romania^{PM}	
1	Bongi Mbonambi	South Africa	France^{QF}	
1	Handré Pollard	South Africa	England^{SF}	
1	Darcy Graham	Scotland	Romania^{PM}	
1	Duhan van der Merwe	Scotland	Tonga^{PM}	
1	George Moala	Tonga	Romania^{PM}	
1	Santiago Arata	Uruguay	Namibia^{PM}	
1	Gareth Anscombe	Wales	Australia^{PM}	
1	Dan Biggar	Wales	Fiji^{PM}	
1	Jac Morgan	Wales	Portugal^{PM}	
1	Tommy Reffell	Wales	Georgia^{PM}	

Key
^{PM}	Pool match
^{QF}	Quarter-final
^{SF}	Semi-final
^{BF}	Bronze final
^{F}	Final

== Squads ==
Each team named a squad made up of 33 players, two more than the previous World Cup.

=== Coaches ===
- Oldest coach: Eddie Jones of Australia - (63 years, 244 days vs Portugal)
- Youngest coach: Steve Borthwick of England - (43 years, 332 days vs Argentina)
- Country with most coaches: New Zealand (4)
  - Kieran Crowley of Italy
  - Jamie Joseph of Japan
  - Ian Foster of New Zealand
  - Warren Gatland of Wales
- Teams with foreign coaches: 10
  - Argentina
  - Chile
  - Ireland
  - Italy
  - Japan
  - Namibia
  - Portugal
  - Tonga
  - Uruguay
  - Wales
- Coaches who were former players: 11
  - Steve Borthwick of England (2007 with England)
  - Kieran Crowley of Italy (1987 & 1991 with New Zealand)
  - Andy Farrell of Ireland (2007 with England)
  - Fabien Galthié of France (1991, 1995, 1999 and 2003 with France)
  - Jamie Joseph of Japan (1995 with New Zealand and 1999 with Japan)
  - Toutai Kefu of Tonga (1999 with Australia)
  - Patrice Lagisquet of Portugal (1987 and 1991 with France)
  - Pablo Lemoine of Chile (1999 and 2003 with Uruguay)
  - Seilala Mapusua of Samoa (2007 and 2011 with Samoa)
  - Simon Raiwalui of Fiji (1999 with Fiji)
  - Gregor Townsend of Scotland (1999 and 2003 with Scotland)
- Coaches with previous World Cup head-coaching experience: 9
  - Michael Cheika of Argentina (head coach of Australia in 2015 & 2019)
  - Kieran Crowley of Italy (head coach of Canada in 2011 & 2015)
  - Warren Gatland of Wales (head coach of Ireland in 1999 & Wales in 2011, 2015 & 2019)
  - Eddie Jones of Australia (head coach of Australia in 2003, Japan in 2015 & England in 2019)
  - Jamie Joseph of Japan (head coach of Japan in 2019)
  - Toutai Kefu of Tonga (head coach of Tonga in 2019)
  - Pablo Lemoine of Chile (head coach of Uruguay in 2015)
  - Esteban Meneses of Uruguay (head coach of Uruguay in 2019)
  - Gregor Townsend of Scotland (head coach of Scotland in 2019)
- Appearance record: Warren Gatland of Wales participated in the Rugby World Cup for the fifth time as head coach.

=== Players ===
- Four squads had no players based outside their respective home countries:
  - France
  - Ireland
  - Japan
  - New Zealand
- Squad having the fewest players playing domestically: Tonga (0)
- The most players (152) are active in clubs based in France, 106 of them in the Top 14, 32 in Pro D2, and 14 in Championnat Fédéral Nationale, Fédérale 1, 2, 3.
- Oldest player: P. J. van Lill of Namibia - (39 years, 297 days - vs Uruguay)
- Youngest player: Tornike Kakhoidze of Georgia - (20 years, 45 days - vs Fiji)

== Discipline ==
=== Yellow cards ===
2 yellow cards

- (Chile) Matías Dittus (vs Japan & England)
- (Romania) Marius Simionescu (vs Ireland & Scotland)

1 yellow card

- (Argentina) Santiago Carreras (vs England)
- (Argentina) Rodrigo Isgro (vs Chile)
- (Australia) Matt Faessler (vs Portugal)
- (Australia) Samu Kerevi (vs Portugal)
- (Chile) Alfonso Escobar (vs Samoa)
- (Chile) Esteban Inostroza (vs Samoa)
- (Chile) Martín Sigren (vs Japan)
- (Fiji) Levani Botia (vs Portugal)
- (Fiji) Vinaya Habosi (vs England)
- (Fiji) Semi Radradra (vs Georgia)
- (Fiji) Lekima Tagitagivalu (vs Wales)
- (Fiji) Josua Tuisova (vs Georgia)
- (France) Romain Taofifénua (vs Uruguay)
- (Georgia (country)) Mirian Modebadze (vs Australia)
- (Georgia (country)) Davit Niniashvili (vs Wales)
- (Ireland) Peter O'Mahony (vs Tonga)
- (Italy) Lorenzo Cannone (vs Uruguay)
- (Italy) Danilo Fischetti (vs Uruguay)
- (Japan) Shota Horie (vs Samoa)
- (Japan) Lappies Labuschagné (vs Argentina)
- (Japan) Dylan Riley (vs Chile)
- (Namibia) Jason Benade (vs France)
- (Namibia) Aranos Coetzee (vs Uruguay)
- (Namibia) Tjiuee Uanivi (vs Uruguay)
- (Namibia) Torsten van Jaarsveld (vs Italy)
- (New Zealand) Scott Barrett (vs Argentina)
- (New Zealand) Shannon Frizell (vs South Africa)
- (New Zealand) Will Jordan (vs France)
- (New Zealand) Aaron Smith (vs Ireland)
- (New Zealand) Codie Taylor (vs Ireland)
- (Portugal) Pedro Bettencourt (vs Australia)
- (Portugal) Francisco Fernandes (vs Georgia)
- (Romania) Alin Conache (vs Tonga)
- (Romania) Robert Irimescu (vs Scotland)
- (Romania) Florian Roșu (vs Scotland)
- (Samoa) Ere Enari (vs Chile)
- (Samoa) Tumua Manu (vs England)
- (Samoa) Duncan Paia'aua (vs Argentina)
- (Samoa) UJ Seuteni (vs Chile)
- (Samoa) Jonathan Taumateine (vs Japan)
- (Scotland) Ollie Smith (vs Ireland)
- (South Africa) Eben Etzebeth (vs France)
- (South Africa) Cheslin Kolbe (vs New Zealand)
- (South Africa) Siya Kolisi (vs New Zealand)
- (Tonga) Leva Fifita (vs Romania)
- (Tonga) Afusipa Taumoepeau (vs Scotland)
- (Uruguay) Eric Dosantos (vs Namibia)
- (Uruguay) Andres Vilaseca (vs Italy)
- (Wales) Taine Basham (vs Georgia)
- (Wales) Corey Domachowski (vs Fiji)
- (Wales) Johnny Williams (vs Portugal)

=== Red cards ===
A record equaling eight red cards for a Rugby World Cup was issued, same as in 2019.

1 red card

- (England) Tom Curry (vs Argentina)
- (Namibia) Johan Deysel (vs France)
- (Namibia) Desiderius Sethie (vs Uruguay)
- (New Zealand) Sam Cane (vs South Africa)
- (New Zealand) Ethan de Groot (vs Namibia)
- (Portugal) Vincent Pinto (vs Wales)
- (Samoa) Ben Lam (vs Japan)
- (Tonga) Vaea Fifita (vs Scotland)

=== Penalty tries ===
1 penalty try

- Awarded against Italy, vs Uruguay
- Awarded against Namibia, vs France
- Awarded against New Zealand, vs Ireland
- Awarded against Romania, vs South Africa

=== Citing/bans ===
Player	Opposition	Cite date	Law breached	Result	Note	Ref
(England) Tom Curry	Argentina	9 September 2023	9.13 – Dangerous tackle Red card	3-match ban	–	
(New Zealand) Ethan de Groot	Namibia	15 September 2023	9.16 – Charging without attempting to grasp the opponent Red card	3-match ban	–	
(Portugal) Vincent Pinto	Wales	16 September 2023	9.11 – Players must not do anything reckless to others Red card	3-match ban	–	
(Portugal) Rafael Simões	Wales	16 September 2023	9.13 – Dangerous tackle	Citing not upheld	–	
(Namibia) Johan Deysel	France	21 September 2023	9.13 – Dangerous tackle Red card	6-match ban	–	
(Tonga) Vaea Fifita	Scotland	24 September 2023	9.20 – Dangerous charging into ruck or maul Red card	4-match ban	–	
(Namibia) Desiderius Sethie	Uruguay	27 September 2023	9.13 – Dangerous tackle Red card	3-match ban	–	
(Uruguay) Eric Dosantos	Namibia	27 September 2023	9.13 – Dangerous tackle	3-match ban	–	
(Samoa) Ben Lam	Japan	28 September 2023	9.13 – Dangerous tackle Red card	3-match ban	–	
(New Zealand) Sam Cane	South Africa	28 October 2023	9.13 – Dangerous tackle Red card	3-match ban	–	

== Stadiums ==
Stadium	City	Capacity	Matches played	Overall attendance	Average attendance per match	Average attendance as % of capacity	Tries scored	Avg. tries scored / match	Overall points scored	Avg. points scored / match
Stade de France	Saint-Denis	80,698	6	469,782	78,297	97.02%	33	5.5	220	36.67
Stade de Marseille	Marseille	67,394	6	374,629	62,438	92.64%	33	5.5	312	52
OL Stadium	Lyon	59,186	5	277,495	55,499	93.77%	46	9.2	361	72.2
Stade Pierre-Mauroy	Lille	50,186	5	232,585	46,517	92.69%	42	8.4	295	59
Stade de Bordeaux	Bordeaux	42,115	5	200,386	40,077	95.16%	41	8.2	306	61.2
Stade Geoffroy-Guichard	Saint-Étienne	41,965	4	157,132	39,283	93.61%	20	5	174	43.5
Allianz Riviera	Nice	35,624	4	121,016	30,254	84.92%	25	6.25	199	49.75
Stade de la Beaujoire	Nantes	35,322	4	132,840	33,210	94.02%	35	8.75	167	41.75
Stadium de Toulouse	Toulouse	33,150	5	158,089	31,618	95.38%	30	6	261	61.25
Total		2,263,381	44	2,123,954	48,271	93.84%	305	6.93	2,295	52.19

=== Attendances ===
Top 10 highest attendances. All Top 10 games were played in Stade de France, Saint-Denis.

Rank	Attendance	Match	Stage
1	80,065	New Zealand vs South Africa	F
2	79,486	France vs South Africa	QF
3	78,845	Ireland vs New Zealand	QF
4	78,680	France vs New Zealand	PM
5	78,542	South Africa vs Ireland	PM
6	78,459	Ireland vs Scotland	PM
7	78,098	England vs South Africa	SF
8	77,653	New Zealand vs Argentina	SF
9	77,604	England vs Argentina	BF
10	75,770	Australia vs Georgia	PM

- Lowest attendance: 28,627 – Italy vs Uruguay PM

Key
^{PM}	Pool match
^{QF}	Quarter-final
^{SF}	Semi-final
^{BF}	Bronze final
^{F}	Final

== See also ==
- 2019 Rugby World Cup statistics
- Records and statistics of the Rugby World Cup
- List of Rugby World Cup hat-tricks
- List of Rugby World Cup red cards
