= 2027 Men's Rugby World Cup – South America qualification =

Tournament details
- Dates: 18 August 2024 – 18 October 2025
- No. of nations: 8

The qualifying process for the 2027 Men's Rugby World Cup for Sudamérica began in August 2024, with eight teams competing for one qualification spot (Sudamérica 1) into the final tournament and two spots into play-off matches (Sudamérica 2 & 3).

== Format ==
Unlike the other regional qualification process, a tournament did not operate as the regional qualification tournament for Rugby World Cup 2027 in Sudamérica. Instead a format between the main Sudamérica teams (excluding Argentina who had already qualified) and the four development teams was created to decide who would qualify for the World Cup.

Qualification took place over three rounds with a single repechage match between the second and third rounds;

- Round 1 saw the four development Sudamérica nations (Colombia, Costa Rica, Peru and Venezuela), play in a straight knock-out format with the winner advancing to the Round 3 repechage match against the bottom placed side in Round 2.
- Round 2 saw the evolving Sudamérica nations Brazil, Chile and Paraguay play in a round robin format with the top two sides advancing to Round 3 directly, whilst the bottom placed side progressed to the Round 3 repechage match against the winner of Round 1.
- Round 3 saw the top two sides from Round 2 and the winner of the Round 3 repechage match join the highest remaining ranked Sudamérica team, Uruguay, in the final stage of qualification. The third round will start with a home and away two-legged semi-final play-off series (seeded by 1 v 4 and 2 v 3), with the two winners progressing to the Sudamérica 1 play-off series and the two losers advancing to the Sudamérica 3 play-off series.
  - The winner of the Sudamérica 1 series on aggregate over the two legs played home and away, qualified for the World Cup as Sudamérica 1, whilst the loser advanced to a cross-regional play-off series against Pacific 4 in a Pacific / Sudamérica play-off series to qualify for the World Cup.
  - The winner of the Sudamérica 3 series on aggregate over the two legs played home and away, progressed to the Final Qualification Tournament, as did the loser of the Pacific / Sudamérica play-off series.

== Entrants ==
Eight teams will compete during the Sudamérica qualifiers for the 2027 Rugby World Cup, with Argentina the only team qualified from the Region prior to the qualification process.

(Rankings as of first qualification match in this region)

Nation	Rank	Began play	Qualifying status
Argentina	6	N/A	Qualified with Top 12 finish at 2023 World Cup
Brazil	29	18 August 2024	Advances to Final Qualification Tournament as Sudamérica 3 on 24 October 2025 following Paraguay's voluntary withdrawal.
Chile	22	28 September 2024	Qualified as Pacific / Sudamérica qualifying play-off winner / Sudamérica 1 on 27 September 2025
Colombia	42	25 September 2024	Eliminated by Paraguay on 16 October 2024
Costa Rica	93	25 September 2024	Eliminated by Colombia on 25 September 2024
Paraguay	41	18 August 2024	Voluntarily withdrawn on 24 October 2025 due to fielding an ineligible player in the 3rd place play-off.
Peru	80	25 September 2024	Eliminated by Venezuela on 25 September 2024
Uruguay	17	26 July 2025	Qualified as Sudamérica 2 on 6 September 2025
Venezuela	78	25 September 2024	Eliminated by Colombia on 29 September 2024

== Round 1 ==
The first round was contested by four teams in a knockout format, which was held in Medellín, Colombia.

The semi-finals match-ups were decided by the World Rugby Rankings; Colombia (42) played Costa Rica (93) and Venezuela (78) played Peru (80).

Colombia won the first round and advanced to the round 3 repechage match, whilst Costa Rica, Peru and Venezuela were eliminated.

=== Semi Finals ===
25 September 2024
10:00 COT (UTC-05)

Peru	15–27	Venezuela
Try: Vascones 10' m Mendoza Flores 70' c Con: Flores Lecca (1/2) 71'; Pen: Flores Lecca (1/2) 45'; Cards: Medina (yellow card) 15'; Ramirez (yellow card) 38'	Report; WR details	Try: Madriz 22' m JE. Davila 28' m Zabala 40' m Lopez 49' m Arrieta 63' m Con: J. Hernandez (1/1) 63'; Cards: Veitia Millan (yellow card) 67'

Estadio Cincuentenario, Medellín
Referee: Sergio Alvarenga (Paraguay)

25 September 2024
15:00 COT (UTC-05)

Colombia	136–0	Costa Rica
Try: Rodallegas 3' c Agudelo 6' c Garcia (3) 11' c, 19' m, 73' c Guisao (8) 16' c, 28' c, 38' c, 42' c, 46', 55' c, 63' c, 79' c L. Giraldo (3) 23' c, 31' c, 67' c Romero 35' m Tellez Hernández 51' c Alzate 61' c Huertas 70' c Con: Arango (18/20) 4', 7', 12', 16', 24', 29', 32', 39', 43', 46', 52', 57', 62', 64', 68', 71', 73', 80'	Report; WR details	Cards: Robinson (yellow card) 30' (red card) 60'

Estadio Cincuentenario, Medellín
Referee: Frank Mendez (Chile)

=== Bronze Final ===
29 September 2024
10:00 COT (UTC-05)

Peru	44–0	Costa Rica
Try: Ramirez 2' c Escanes 16' m Mendoza Flores 21' m Maria Ramirez 33' m Andersson 54' m Etchebarne 61' m Vascones 75' c Valdivia 78' m Con: Machuga (1/5) 3'; Flores Lecca (1/3) 76'; Cards: Soto (yellow card) 64'	Report; WR details	Cards: Sibaja (yellow card) 29'; Carmona (yellow card) 31'

Estadio Cincuentenario, Medellín
Referee: Luca Solda (Argentina)

=== Final ===
29 September 2024
15:00 COT (UTC-05)

Venezuela	5–50	Colombia
Try: Lopez 42' m	Report; WR details	Try: Jiménez (2) 10' m, 51' m Alvarez 15' c Alzate 36' c Llanos (2) 58' c, 76' c Ruiz 71' m Benites 79' c Con: Arango (5/8) 15', 36', 59', 76', 80'; Cards: D. Giraldo (yellow card) 40'

Estadio Cincuentenario, Medellín
Referee: Cauã Ricardo Santos (Brazil)

=== Final standings ===
Pos.	Team	Qualification
1	Colombia	Advances to Round 3 - play off v Paraguay
2	Venezuela	Eliminated from Qualification.
3	Peru	Eliminated from Qualification.
4	Costa Rica	Eliminated from Qualification.

== Round 2 ==
Round 2 saw Paraguay finish bottom and dropped down to the Round 3 repechage match whilst Brazil and Chile advanced directly to the third round.

Pos	Team	Pld	W	D	L	PF	PA	PD	B	Pts	Qualification
1	Chile	2	2	0	0	100	10	+90	2	10	Advances to Round 3
2	Brazil	2	1	0	1	87	53	+34	1	5	Advances to Round 3
3	Paraguay	2	0	0	2	17	141	−124	0	0	Round 3 repechage

Rules for classification: Tiebreakers for teams tied on points: 1) Number of matches won; 2) Difference between points for and against; 3) Total number of points for; 4) Aggregate number of points scored in matches between tied teams; 5) Number of matches won excluding the first match, then the second and so on until the tie is settled.

=== Matches ===
18 August 2024
15:30 BRT (UTC-03)

Brazil	77–17	Paraguay
Try: Rodrigues 4' c Mignot (3) 13' c, 26' c, 57' c Arruda (2) 16' c, 35' c Rocha 22' c Tenorio 43' c Massari 62' c Ferreira (2) 78' c, 80' c Con: Tranquez (8/8) 5', 14', 17', 23', 27', 36', 44',58'; Moises Duque (3/3) 63', 79', 81'	Report; World Rugby	Try: Gracete 38' c Urbieta 41' c Con: Urbieta (2/2) 39', 42'; Pen: Urbieta (1/1) 8'

Estádio Nicolau Alayon, São Paulo
Referee: Pablo De Luca (Argentina)

28 September 2024
15:00 CDT (UTC-03)

Chile	64–0	Paraguay
Try: Saab 12’ c Bohme (2) 17’ c, 24’ c Armstrong 30’ c C. Saavedra 34’ c Martínez 48’ m D. Saavedra 55' m Garafulic 63’ m Tchimino 71’ c Torrealba 80' c Con: S.Videla (7/1) 13’, 18’, 25’, 31’, 35’, 72’, 80’	Report; WR details

Estadio Municipal de La Pintana, La Pintana
Referee: Francisco González (Uruguay)

6 October 2024
15:00 CDT (UTC-03)

Chile	36–10	Brazil
Try: Garafulic (2) 14' m, 43' c Sigren 40' c Dittus 72' c Tchimino 76' c Con: S. Videla (4/5) 40', 44', 73', 76'; Pen: S. Videla (1/1) 49'; Cards: Eissmann (yellow card) 52'	Report; WR details	Try: Paganini 79' c Con: Tranquez (1/1) 80'; Pen: Tranquez (1/2) 33'; Cards: Pinheiro (yellow card) 40'; Marino (yellow card) 52'; Teixeira (yellow card) 52'; Rodrigues (red card) 59'

Estadio Municipal de La Pintana, La Pintana
Referee: Nehuen Jauri Rivero (Argentina)

== Round 3 Repechage ==
The winner of this match, Paraguay, advanced to Round 3, whilst Colombia were eliminated.

16 October 2024
20:00 PYST (UTC-03)

Paraguay	49–18	Colombia
Try: González 26' c Núñez 32' m Bareiro 39' c Camusio (2) 41' c, 67' m Martínez 54' c Con: Mussi (4/6) 26', 40', 42', 55'; Pen: Mussi (2/3) 23', 47'	Report; World Rugby	Try: Guisao 36' m J Ortíz 80' c Con: Ortíz (1/2) 80'; Pen: Ortíz (2/2) 4', 30'

Estadio Héroes de Curupayty, Luque
Referee: Damián Schneider (Argentina)

== Round 3 ==
The third round away a straight knockout format, seeded by 1 v 4 and 2 v 3.

The winner qualified for the World Cup as Sudamérica 1, whilst the runner-up progressed to a play-off series against Pacific 4 (Samoa) for direct qualification to the World Cup. The third placed team advanced to the Final Qualification Tournament, along with the loser of the play-off series.

=== Bracket ===
Semifinals
Chile	35	35	70
Brazil	21	20	41
Uruguay	38	78	116
Paraguay	0	10	10

Finals
Chile	16	21	37
Uruguay	28	18	46
Third place
Brazil	19	24	43
Paraguay	39	31	70

=== Matches ===
==== Semi-final 1 ====
===== First leg =====
19 July 2025
15:00 BRT (UTC-3)

Brazil	21–35	Chile
Try: Hollister 11' c Dell’Acqua 48' c Oliveira 80' c Con: Oviedo (3/3) 12', 49', 80'; Cards: Días (yellow card) 66'	Report; WR details	Try: Gurruchaga 23' m D. Escobar 29' c A. Escobar 35' c Penalty try 66'; Con: Videla (2/3) 30', 36'; Pen: Videla (3/3) 10', 40', 76'; Cards: Saavedra (yellow card) 79'

Estádio Nicolau Alayon, São Paulo
Attendance: 1,300
Referee: Pablo De Luca (Argentina)

===== Second leg =====
26 July 2025
14:00 CST (UTC-4)

Chile	35–20	Brazil
Try: Martínez (2) 19' m, 31' c Savedra 59' c Dittus 80' c Con: Videla (3/4) 32', 60', 80+1'; Pen: Videla (3/4) 27', 54', 70'; Cards: Savedra (yellow card) 44'	Report; WR details	Try: Willian 47' c Moreno 67' c Con: Oviedo (2/2) 48', 68'; Pen: Oviedo (2/2) 17', 41'; Cards: Cláudio (yellow card) 59'

Chile Rugby High Performance Centre, La Reina
Referee: Francisco Gonzalez (Uruguay)

==== Semi-final 2 ====
===== First leg =====
26 July 2025
16:30 PYT (UTC-3)

Paraguay	0–38	Uruguay
	Report; WR details	Try: Civetta (3) 2' c, 27' c, 71' c T. Etcheverry 14' m Kessler 25' m S. Álvarez 67' c Con: S. Álvarez (4/6) 3', 28', 68', 72'

Estadio Héroes de Curupayty, Luque
Referee: Gonzalo De Achaval (Argentina)

===== Second leg =====
23 August 2025
15:30 UYT (UTC-3)

Uruguay	78–10	Paraguay
Try: Deus (3) 7' c, 15' c, 55' c Amarillo 23' c González (2) 29' c, 77' c Pérez 33' c S. Álvarez 36' c I. Álvarez (2) 43' m, 63' c Amaya 67' m Pujadas 74' m Con: S. Álvarez (6/7) 8', 16', 24', 30', 34', 37'; Amaya (3/5) 56', 64', 78'	Report; WR details	Try: Scribano 40' c Con: Mussi (1/1) 40+1'; Pen: Mussi (1/1) 19'

Estadio Charrúa, Montevideo
Referee: Damián Schneider (Argentina)

==== Sudamérica 3 play-off ====
Paraguay won 70–43 on aggregate. However, Paraguay voluntarily withdrew after fielding an ineligible player in the playoffs, leaving Brazil to progress to the Final Qualification Tournament against Europe 5 (Belgium), Asia/Africa play-off winner (Namibia) and Pacific/Sudamérica qualifying play-off loser (Samoa)

===== First leg =====
11 October 2025
16:00 PYT (UTC-3)

Paraguay	39–19	Brazil
Try: Quinteros 1' c Schauman 31' c Ochipinti 51' m Lopez 68' c Salvi 75' c Con: Urbieta (4/5) 2', 32', 69', 76'; Pen: Urbieta (2/2) 13', 48'; Cards: Gonzalez (yellow card) 64'; Nunez (yellow card) 78'	Report; WR details	Try: Tranquez 10' c Arruda 17' c De Morais 27' m Con: Tranquez (2/3) 11', 18'; Cards: Pinheiro (yellow card) 31'

Estadio Héroes de Curupayty, Luque
Referee: Francisco Gonzalez (Uruguay)

===== Second leg =====
18 October 2025
15:00 BRT (UTC-03)

Brazil	24–31	Paraguay
Try: Arruda 9' c do Amaral 15' c Marino 69' c Con: Tranquez (3/3) 10', 15', 70'; Pen: Tranquez (1/1) 3'; Cards: Alves (yellow card) 12'; Arruda (yellow card) 42'; Rebolo (yellow card) 49'; Cláudio (yellow card) 71'; Marino (red card) 77'	Report; WR details	Try: Blasco 13' c Núñez 40' c Paiva 47' m Con: López (2/3) 14', 40'; Pen: Urbieta (3/3) 48', 65', 73'; Drop: Urbieta (1/1) 33'; Cards: Martínez (yellow card) 16'; Amarilla (yellow card) 76'; Pérez (yellow card) 80'

Estadio Du Cambusano, Jacareí
Referee: Tomás Bertazza (Argentina)

==== Sudamérica 1 play-off ====
Uruguay qualified winning 46–37 on aggregate, while Chile progressed to a Pacific / Sudamérica qualifying play-off against Pacific 4 (Samoa).

===== First leg =====
30 August 2025
15:00 CST (UTC-4)

Chile	16–28	Uruguay
Try: M. Garafulic 34' c Con: Videla (1/1) 35'; Pen: Videla (3/4) 18', 27', 48'	Report	Try: Pérez 7' c Kessler 23' c Arata 54' c I. Álvarez 57' c Con: Etcheverry (4/4) 8', 25', 55', 58'

Estadio Municipal de La Pintana, La Pintana
Referee: Jérémy Rozier (France)

Team details

FB	15	Cristóbal Game		(substituted off) 66'	(substituted in) 75'
RW	14	Iñaki Ayarza
OC	13	Matías Garafulic
IC	12	Santiago Videla
LW	11	Nicolás Garafulic
FH	10	Rodrigo Fernández		(substituted off) 64'
SH	9	Benjamín Videla		(substituted off) 64'
N8	8	Alfonso Escobar
OF	7	Clemente Saavedra (c)
BF	6	Raimundo Martínez	(yellow card) 21'	(substituted off) 66'
RL	5	Javier Eissmann		(substituted off) 62'
LL	4	Santiago Pedrero
TP	3	Iñaki Gurruchaga		(substituted off) 58'
HK	2	Diego Escobar
LP	1	Javier Carrasco		(substituted off) 58'
Substitutions:
HK	16	Salvador Lues		(substituted in) 66'
PR	17	Augusto Böhme		(substituted in) 58'
PR	18	Matías Dittus		(substituted in) 58'
LK	19	Bruno Sáez
FL	20	Ernesto Tchimino		(substituted in) 62'
SH	21	Lucas Berti		(substituted in) 64'
FH	22	Juan Cruz Reyes		(substituted in) 64'
CE	23	Nicolás Saab		(substituted in) 66'	(substituted off) 75'
Coach:
(Uruguay) Pablo Lemoine

FB	15	Juan González
RW	14	Bautista Basso		(substituted off) 48'
OC	13	Felipe Arcos Pérez
IC	12	Andrés Vilaseca		(substituted off) 66'
LW	11	Baltazar Amaya
FH	10	Felipe Etcheverry
SH	9	Santiago Arata
N8	8	Manuel Ardao		(substituted off) 66'
OF	7	Lucas Bianchi
BF	6	Santiago Civetta
RL	5	Manuel Leindekar (c)
LL	4	Felipe Aliaga		(substituted off) 59'
TP	3	Reinaldo Piussi		(substituted off) 40'
HK	2	Germán Kessler		(substituted off) 48'
LP	1	Mateo Sanguinetti	(yellow card) 33'	(substituted off) 46'
Substitutions:
HK	16	Facundo Gattas		(substituted in) 48'
PR	17	Francisco Suárez		(substituted in) 46'
PR	18	Ignacio Péculo		(substituted in) 40'
LK	19	Ignacio Dotti		(substituted in) 59'
FL	20	Carlos Deus	(yellow card) 74'	(substituted in) 66'
SH	21	Santiago Álvarez
FH	22	Ignacio Álvarez	(yellow card) 66'	(substituted in) 48'
WG	23	Juan Manuel Alonso		(substituted in) 66'
Coach:
(Argentina) Rodolfo Ambrosio

Assistant referees:
Damián Schneider (Argentina)
Tomás Bertazza (Argentina)
Television match official:
Marcelo Pilara (Argentina)

===== Second leg =====
6 September 2025
15:30 UYT (UTC-3)

Uruguay	18–21	Chile
Try: Etcheverry 25' c Diana 67' m Con: Etcheverry (1/2) 26'; Pen: Etcheverry (2/2) 54', 60'	Report	Try: Dittus (2) 46' c, 75' c Lues 62' c Con: S. Videla (3/3) 47', 62', 75'

Estadio Charrúa, Montevideo
Referee: Jérémy Rozier (France)

Team details

FB	15	Juan González
RW	14	Bautista Basso
OC	13	Felipe Arcos Pérez
IC	12	Andrés Vilaseca
LW	11	Ignacio Álvarez		(substituted off) 23'
FH	10	Felipe Etcheverry
SH	9	Santiago Arata	(yellow card) 71'
N8	8	Manuel Ardao	(yellow card) 74'
OF	7	Lucas Bianchi		(substituted off) 50'
BF	6	Santiago Civetta		(substituted off) 69'
RL	5	Manuel Leindekar (c)				(substituted off) 72'
LL	4	Felipe Aliaga		(substituted off) 17'	(substituted in) 21'
TP	3	Reinaldo Piussi		(substituted off) 45'
HK	2	Germán Kessler		(substituted off) 42'
LP	1	Mateo Sanguinetti		(substituted off) 46'
Substitutions:
HK	16	Facundo Gattas		(substituted in) 42'
PR	17	Francisco Suárez		(substituted in) 46'
PR	18	Ignacio Péculo		(substituted in) 45'
LK	19	Ignacio Dotti		(substituted in) 17'	(substituted off) 21'	(substituted in) 72'
FL	20	Carlos Deus		(substituted in) 69'
FL	21	Manuel Diana		(substituted in) 50'
SH	22	Santiago Álvarez
WG	23	Juan Manuel Alonso	(yellow card) 46'	(substituted in) 23'
Coach:
(Argentina) Rodolfo Ambrosio

FB	15	Cristóbal Game	(substituted off) 72'
RW	14	Nicolás Garafulic
OC	13	Matías Garafulic	(substituted off) 46'
IC	12	Nicolás Saab
LW	11	Iñaki Ayarza
FH	10	Santiago Videla
SH	9	Benjamín Videla	(substituted off) 56'
N8	8	Alfonso Escobar	(substituted off) 40'
OF	7	Clemente Saavedra (c)
BF	6	Raimundo Martínez
RL	5	Javier Eissmann	(substituted off) 56'
LL	4	Santiago Pedrero
TP	3	Iñaki Gurruchaga	(substituted off) 40'
HK	2	Diego Escobar	(substituted off) 72'
LP	1	Javier Carrasco	(substituted off) 40'
Substitutions:
HK	16	Augusto Böhme	(substituted in) 40'
PR	17	Salvador Lues	(substituted in) 40'
PR	18	Matías Dittus	(substituted in) 40'
FL	19	Joaquín Milesi	(substituted in) 72'
FL	20	Ernesto Tchimino	(substituted in) 56'
SH	21	Lucas Berti	(substituted in) 56'
FH	22	Juan Cruz Reyes	(substituted in) 46'
FH	23	Tomás Salas	(substituted in) 72'
Coach:
(Uruguay) Pablo Lemoine

Assistant referees:
Tomás Bertazza (Argentina)
Federico Longobardi (Argentina)
Television match official:
Lucas Galan (Argentina)

== See also ==
- 2027 Men's Rugby World Cup
- 2027 Men's Rugby World Cup qualifying
