= Vesi Rarawa =

Fijian rugby union footballer (born 1985)

- Born: Vesi Rarawa; 4 October 1985 (age 41) Fiji
- Height: 1.82 m (6 ft 0 in)
- Weight: 115 kg (18 st 2 lb)

Rugby union career
- Position: prop
- Current team: Selknam
Senior career
Years	Team	Apps	(Points)
- Duavata Rugby Club
- Fiji Barbarians
2017	Fijian Drua	2	(15)
2020−	Selknam	2	(0)
International career
Years	Team	Apps	(Points)
2010	Fiji	1	(0)
- Correct as of 31 May 2010

Vesi Rarawa (born 4 October 1985 in Fiji) is a Fijian rugby union footballer. He plays prop for the Fiji Barbarians and his club, the Duavata Rugby Club. In May 2010, Vesi was selected to the national Fiji side to play against Australia after military-affiliated players were subjected to visa bans in the wake of the 2006 Fijian coup d'état.

In 2010 he was selected for the Fiji Barbarians.
