= José Ignacio Larenas =

Chile international rugby union player

- Full name: José Ignacio Larenas Hitschfeld
- Born: 14 September 1989 (age 37) Chile
- Height: 182 cm (6 ft 0 in)
- Weight: 94 kg (207 lb; 14 st 11 lb)

Rugby union career
- Position: Centre
Senior career
Years	Team	Apps	(Points)
2021–	Selknam	46	
International career
Years	Team	Apps	(Points)
2008–09	Chile U20		
2012–24	Chile	50	(55)

José Ignacio Larenas Hitschfeld (born 14 September 1989) is a Chilean former rugby union player. He played Centre for Chile internationally, and for Selknam in the Super Rugby Americas competition. He represented Chile in the 2023 Rugby World Cup.

== Career ==
Larenas began his career at Club Deportivo Universidad Católica in 2001.

His international career started at the 2007 Under-19 Rugby World Championship Division B competition in Ireland at the age of 17. He subsequently represented Chile's under-20 team at the World Rugby U20 Trophy tournament in 2008, and led the side in 2009.

He debuted for Chile in 2012 as an inside center, where he enjoyed a long and successful career, becoming the player with the most official appearances, and the current all-time leading try scorer for the Chilean national rugby team with 10 tries.

In 2017 and 2018, he captained the team, notably leading them to victory over Uruguay in the 2018 South American Rugby Championship.

In 2021, he joined Selknam Rugby, where he played four seasons in the Super Rugby Americas competition. Selknam reached the semifinals in 2021, and finished as runners-up in 2022, making 46 official appearances. He was part of the Chilean side that won the 2021 Copa Trasandina after beating Argentina XV at the San Carlos de Apoquindo Stadium.

He was named in the Chilean squad for the 2023 Rugby World Cup in France. He served as vice-captain and participated in three of the four group stage matches against Japan, Samoa, and Argentina.

Ignacio Larenas played his last test match on 20 July 2024, against Scotland at the Julio Martínez Prádanos National Stadium before more than 25,000 people, a record attendance for a national rugby event. He is considered one of the most influential players in national rugby, of which he was a key figure in the process of transformation towards professionalism.
