= Javier Eissmann =

Chile international rugby union player

- Born: 21 March 1997 (age 29)
- Height: 200 cm (6 ft 7 in)
- Weight: 118 kg (260 lb; 18 st 8 lb)

Rugby union career
- Position: Lock
Senior career
Years	Team	Apps	(Points)
?–2024	CS Universidad Católica		
2020–2024	Selknam	11	(5)
2024–	SU Agen	10	(0)
International career
Years	Team	Apps	(Points)
2019–Present	Chile	29	(10)

Javier Eissmann (born 21 March 1997) is a Chilean rugby union player. He plays Lock for Chile at an international level, and for French club, SU Agen in the Pro D2 competition. He represented Chile in the 2023 Rugby World Cup.

== Early life and career ==
Eissmann grew up in a francophile family, and obtained his baccalauréat scientifique in a French high school in Santiago, with an education in French. Subsequently, he studied structural engineering and acquired a master's degree in seismic analysis.

Eissmann began playing rugby union with Club Deportivo Universidad Católica, where he later played in the Chilean Championship as a senior.

== International career ==
On 2 February 2019, he made his international debut for Chile against the United States.

In August 2023, he was called up to the Chilean squad, for their very first Rugby World Cup. He participated in all four matches in the tournament, including three as a starter, in the matches against Japan, England, and Argentina.

== Professional career ==
Following the creation of the Super Rugby Americas competition in 2020, Eissmann joined the Chilean franchise Selknam, and made his professional debut in the first edition.

Eissmann was recruited in October 2024 by SU Agen as an injury replacement for John Madigan. The following month, he decided to forgo joining the Chilean national team for the November tour, preferring to focus on his club career. In his first start for the Agen club, he put in a good performance. Following an injury to the teams captain, Arnaud Duputs, he was retained as an injury replacement in December to cover his absence until March 2025.
