= Thomas Orchard =

Chile international rugby union player

- Born: 12 January 1997 (age 29)
- Height: 196 cm (6 ft 5 in)
- Weight: 105 kg (231 lb; 16 st 7 lb)

Rugby union career
- Position: Lock
Senior career
Years	Team	Apps	(Points)
2020–	Selknam		
International career
Years	Team	Apps	(Points)
2017	Chile U20		
2018–	Chile	12	

Thomas Orchard (born 12 January 1997) is a Chilean rugby union player. He plays Lock for Chile internationally, and for Selknam in the Super Rugby Americas competition. He competed at the 2023 Rugby World Cup.

== Early career ==
Orchard started playing rugby at a young age for the Old Lions club. Since the age of 17, he has been part of several youth national teams.

He studied medicine at the University of Antofagasta.

== Career ==
Orchard represented the Chilean under-20 team at the 2017 Under 20 Trophy tournament that was held in Uruguay.

In 2020, he joined Selknam in the Super Rugby Americas competition. He was named in Chile's squad to the 2023 Rugby World Cup in France.
