= Augusto Sarmiento =

Chile international rugby union player

- Born: 30 April 1993 (age 33)
- Height: 194 cm (6 ft 4 in)
- Weight: 113 kg (249 lb; 17 st 11 lb)

Rugby union career
- Position: Lock
Senior career
Years	Team	Apps	(Points)
2019–2020	CR Cisneros		
2020–2022	UBU Colina Burgos		
2021–	Selknam		
2024	Rugby Calvisano		
2024–2025	UBU Colina Burgos		
International career
Years	Team	Apps	(Points)
2013	Chile U20		
2019–Present	Chile	15	

Augusto Sarmiento (born 30 April 1993) is a Chilean rugby union player. He plays Lock for Chile internationally. He competed for Chile in the 2023 Rugby World Cup.

== Early career ==
Sarmiento began playing rugby at age 11 for the Prince of Wales Country Club youth academy in Chile. He studied law at Gabriela Mistral University between 2011 and 2019, and also played for their rugby team.

== Rugby career ==
Sarmiento competed for the Chilean under-20 team at the 2013 Junior World Rugby Trophy tournament.

He had a stint in Spain with CR Cisneros, before joining UBU Colina Burgos for the 2020–21 División de Honor season. In 2021, he joined Selknam in the Super Rugby Americas competition.

In 2022, he suffered a knee injury in the SLAR final against Peñarol, which sidelined him for four months. He recovered in time for the World Cup qualifying round against the United States. Prior to Chile's Europe tour, he tore his ACL and required surgery at the end of 2022.

Sarmiento was selected in Chile's squad to the 2023 Rugby World Cup in France. He made his World Cup debut in the final pool game loss to Argentina.

He signed with Italian club, Rugby Calvisano, in August 2024. In October, he rejoined UBU Colina Burgos for the 2024–25 División de Honor de Rugby season.
