= Pablo Casas =

Chile international rugby union player

- Born: 4 March 1992 (age 34)
- Height: 188 cm (6 ft 2 in)
- Weight: 95 kg (209 lb; 14 st 13 lb)

Rugby union career
- Position(s): Centre, Fullback
Senior career
Years	Team	Apps	(Points)
- Selknam
2023–Present	CSA Steaua București		
International career
Years	Team	Apps	(Points)
2016–Present	Chile	15	

Pablo Casas (born 4 March 1992) is a Chilean rugby union player. He plays for Chile at an international level and competed in the 2023 Rugby World Cup.

== Career ==
Casas previously played for Spanish club, CR Cisneros. In 2020, he signed with Portuguese club, Lousa, in the Campeonato Nacional de Rugby competition.

He played for Selknam in the Super Rugby Americas competition. In 2023, he joined Romanian club, CSA Steaua București in the Liga de Rugby Kaufland.

Casas was named in Chile's first-ever World Cup squad that debuted at the 2023 tournament in France.
