= Franco Velarde =

Chile international rugby union player (born 1994)

- Born: 4 November 1994 (age 32)
- Height: 185 cm (6 ft 1 in)
- Weight: 90 kg (198 lb; 14 st 2 lb)

Rugby union career
- Position: Wing
Senior career
Years	Team	Apps	(Points)
2021–	Selknam		
International career
Years	Team	Apps	(Points)
2017–	Chile	16	(0)

Franco Velarde (born 4 November 1994) is a Chilean rugby union player. He represents Chile internationally, and for Selknam in the Super Rugby Americas competition. He competed for Chile in the 2023 Rugby World Cup.

== Career ==
Velarde played for the Viña Rugby Club (formerly Viña Rugby Old Boys and Girls).

In 2017, he made his international debut for Chile against Brazil. He played for Barça Rugby from 2017 to 2020 and scored 26 tries for the side.

At the beginning of 2021, he returned to Chile and joined Selknam in the Super Rugby Americas competition. Later in October, he participated in Chile's historic win against Canada in their bid to qualify for the World Cup. In late October, he signed with Spanish club, SilverStorm El Salvador, who were leading the División de Honor de Rugby league.

He was selected in Chile's squad to the 2023 Rugby World Cup in France.

In 2026, he signed with Ordizia Rugby Elkartea for a season. He previously had stints with French club, Stade Français Paris, and Castilla y León Iberians in Spain.
