= Lukas Carvallo =

Chile international rugby union player

- Born: 6 July 2001 (age 25)
- Height: 180 cm (5 ft 11 in)
- Weight: 86 kg (190 lb; 13 st 8 lb)

Rugby union career
- Position: Scrum-half
Senior career
Years	Team	Apps	(Points)
2021–Present	Selknam		
International career
Years	Team	Apps	(Points)
2021–Present	Chile		

Lukas Carvallo (born 6 July 2001) is a Chilean rugby union player. He plays Scrum-half for Chile at an international level, and for Selknam in the Super Rugby Americas competition. He represented Chile in the 2023 Rugby World Cup.

== Career ==
In 2019, he represented Chile in the Americas Rugby Challenge U20s competition. He scored a hat-trick and also converted his third try in his sides 44–10 victory over Colombia.

Carvallo featured for the Chile A side in the 2021 Americas Pacific Challenge. He scored a try in his teams 62–0 trouncing of Paraguay A.

In 2021, he joined Selknam in the Super Rugby Americas competition.

Carvallo played against Argentina XV in the warm-up match ahead of the World Cup. He was named in Chile's first-ever World Cup squad that competed at the 2023 tournament in France.
