= Nicolás Herreros =

Chile international rugby union player

- Born: 23 January 1990 (age 36)
- Height: 170 cm (5 ft 7 in)
- Weight: 79 kg (174 lb; 12 st 6 lb)

Rugby union career
- Position: Scrum-half
Senior career
Years	Team	Apps	(Points)
2018–21	Aparejadores Rugby		
2021–23	Iberians		
2023	Selknam		
2023–	Agronomia		
International career
Years	Team	Apps	(Points)
2008–09	Chile U20		
2021–	Chile		
National sevens team
Years	Team		Comps
2017	Chile 7s		

Nicolás Herreros (born 23 January 1990) is a Chilean rugby union player. He plays Scrum-half for Chile at an international level. He competed for Chile in the 2023 Rugby World Cup.

== Career ==
In 2009, Herreros played for the Chilean U20s team at the Junior World Rugby Trophy tournament in Kenya.

He played for Tribe 7s in Australia. In 2016, he captained one of the two Queensland Reds teams in the National 7s Championship. He also had stints in New Zealand and France.

He was part of the Chilean sevens team that competed in the 2016–17 World Series, specifically in the Las Vegas and Vancouver rounds.

He spent four years with Spanish club, Aparejadores Rugby, since joining them in 2018. In 2021, he signed with Spanish franchise, the Iberians, who compete in the Rugby Europe Super Cup league.

Herreros made his international debut for Chile against Brazil in 2021. He played for Selknam in the Super Rugby Americas competition.

He was selected in Chile's squad for the 2023 Rugby World Cup in France. He made his World Cup debut from off the bench against Argentina. Following the World Cup, he joined Portuguese club, Agronomia, in the Campeonato Português de Rugby competition.
