= Tonga College =

Secondary school in Tonga

Coordinates: 21°10′59.55″S 175°13′34.96″W

Tonga College is a Tongan secondary school, founded by the Tongan government in 1882. Its origination was a joint effort between King George Tupou I and Reverend Shirley Waldemar Baker who also both formed the Free Church of Tonga in 1885. The school is located in Haʻateiho, Tongatapu, Tonga.

Its total enrollment was 956 students in 2025.
