= Pablo Huete =

Chile international rugby union player

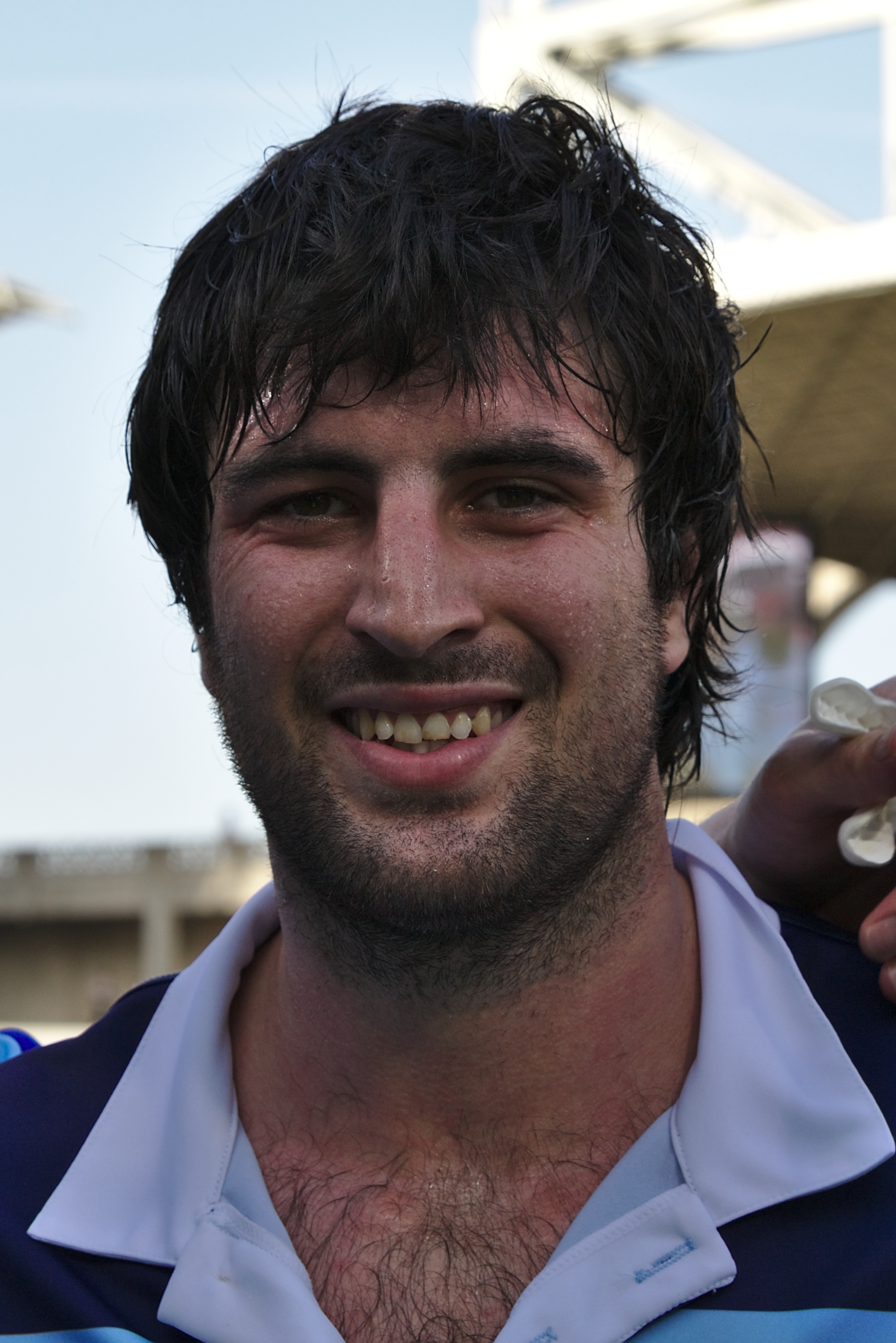
- Huete in 2015
- Born: 11 January 1989 (age 37) Santiago, Chile
- Height: 199 cm (6 ft 6 in)
- Weight: 115 kg (254 lb; 18 st 2 lb)

Rugby union career
- Position: Lock
Amateur team(s)
Years	Team	Apps	(Points)
- Old Grangonian Club
Senior career
Years	Team	Apps	(Points)
2011–12	Castres Olympique		
2012–14	Section Paloise	26	(0)
2014–15	RC Massy	24	(0)
2015–18	Aviron Bayonnais	76	(30)
2018	US Dax		
2018–19	SA XV Charente	16	(0)
2023	Selknam	9	(0)
Provincial / State sides
Years	Team	Apps	(Points)
2011	Tasman	7	(0)
International career
Years	Team	Apps	(Points)
2008–09	Chile U20	5	(0)
2010–23	Chile	33	(0)

Pablo Huete (born 11 January 1989) is a former Chilean rugby union player. He played as a Lock for Chile at an international level. He competed for Chile in the 2023 Rugby World Cup.

== Career ==
Huete began playing rugby in his hometown of Santiago, with the Old Grangonian Club in the Chilean championship. He was coached by former All Black Paul Henderson who resided in Chile.

In 2008 and 2009, He represented Chile's national under-20 rugby union team at the World Rugby U20 Trophy tournaments.

Huete earned his first international cap for Chile's senior side on 29 September 2010 in a test against Tonga in Santiago.

In 2011, on Henderson's advice, he travelled to New Zealand to further his rugby development. He joined provincial side Tasman Makos and played club rugby for Buccaneers RFC, with whom he distinguished himself in a friendly match against a Japan XV's team by scoring a try. On 19 July 2011, he made his provincial debut against North Harbour, and played a total of seven games during the season.

Later in 2011, he joined French club, Castres Olympique, in the Top 14 competition for a season. However, he did not play any matches for Castres senior team, and had to settle with playing in their under-21 division.

In 2012, he signed a two-year contract with Section Paloise in Pro D2, where his compatriot Sergio Valdés was also playing. During his two seasons with Section, the club was defeated in the promotion final in 2013, although he did not play in the match, and in the semi-final the following season. In March 2014, it was announced that he would not be retained by the club at the end of the 2013–2014 season.

In 2014 he joined RC Massy, who had just been promoted to the Pro D2 competition. He stayed for a season with the club where he established himself as a key player, before being released following the club's relegation to Fédérale 1.

In July 2015, while still unattached for a month, he was given a trial by Aviron Bayonnais, who had just been relegated to Pro D2. He officially joined the Basque club a few days later. He then established himself as a key player as a Lock, actively contributing to the club's return to the Top 14 competition at the end of the 2015–2016 season.

In June 2018, following the end of his contract with Aviron, he was unable to reach an agreement for an extension and left the Basque club after three seasons. Later that year, he signed a one-year contract with US Dax in Fédérale 1. However, after playing in the preseason friendlies for Dax, he activated his release clause which allowed him to terminate his contract if he received an offer from a club playing in a higher division. He then signed with Soyaux Angoulême XV for a season.

Upon his return to Chile, he played for Old Grangonian Club. In 2022, he returned to the national team after a three-year absence, when he was called up to the Chilean squad for their autumn tour of Europe.

In 2023, he joined Chilean team, Selknam, in the Super Rugby Americas competition. He was subsequently selected in the Chilean squad to the 2023 Rugby World Cup in France.

=== Retirement ===
Huete announced his retirement from rugby at the beginning of 2024. He then joined the Chilean Rugby Federation.
