= Vittorio Lastra =

- Born: 26 March 1996 (age 30)
- Height: 183 cm (6 ft 0 in)
- Weight: 120 kg (265 lb; 18 st 13 lb)

Rugby union career
- Position: Prop
Senior career
Years	Team	Apps	(Points)
2018–19	Valsugana		
2019–20	Verona		
2022–23	Selknam		
2023–24	Rovigo Delta		
2024–25	Colorno		
2025–	US Bressane		
International career
Years	Team	Apps	(Points)
2017–Present	Chile	23	

Vittorio Lastra (born 26 March 1996) is a Chilean rugby union player. He plays Prop for Chile, and competed in the 2023 Rugby World Cup.

== Career ==
Lastra began his rugby career with the Old Mackayans, he made his senior debut for the club in 2014.

Lastra made his international debut for Chile against Brazil in 2017. He played for Italian club Valsugana Rugby Padova in 2018, before his brief stint in Verona the following year.

He returned to Chile to complete his studies after his stint with Verona, he later obtained a degree in Civil and Industrial Engineering.

Lastra joined Selknam in the Super Rugby Americas competition in 2022. Later that year, he started in Chile's history-making victory over the United States in the American qualifiers for the 2023 World Cup.

He was named in Chile's squad to the 2023 Rugby World Cup in France. He featured in the match against England. Following the World Cup, he signed with Italian club, Rugby Rovigo Delta, for the 2023–2024 season.

Lastra later joined another Italian club, Colorno in 2024. In October 2025, he signed with Union Sportive Bressane, a club in France's third division, Nationale.
