= Tomás Dussaillant =

Chile international rugby union player

- Born: 6 October 1990 (age 36)
- Height: 175 cm (5 ft 9 in)
- Weight: 97 kg (214 lb; 15 st 4 lb)

Rugby union career
- Position: Hooker
Senior career
Years	Team	Apps	(Points)
2020–2024	Selknam	27	
International career
Years	Team	Apps	(Points)
2016–2024	Chile	37	(15)

Tomás Dussaillant (born 6 October 1990) is a former Chilean rugby union player. He played Hooker for Chile internationally, and for Selknam in the Super Rugby Americas competition. He competed in the 2023 Rugby World Cup.

== Career ==
Dussaillant made his international debut for Chile against Brazil in 2016.

He played for Selknam in the Super Rugby Americas competition.

He was named in Chile's squad to the 2023 Rugby World Cup in France. He started in his World Cup debut against Samoa. He scored his sides only try in their final Pool game against Argentina.

Dussaillant made his final appearance for Selknam following his announced retirement in 2024.
