= Esteban Inostroza =

Chile international rugby union player

- Born: 1 January 1994 (age 32)
- Height: 185 cm (6 ft 1 in)
- Weight: 125 kg (276 lb; 19 st 10 lb)

Rugby union career
- Position: Prop
Senior career
Years	Team	Apps	(Points)
2020–	Selknam		
International career
Years	Team	Apps	(Points)
2018–	Chile	2	(0)

Esteban Inostroza (born 1 January 1994) is a Chilean rugby union player. He plays Prop for Chile at an international level, and for Selknam in the Super Rugby Americas competition. He competed in the 2023 Rugby World Cup.

== Career ==
Inostroza found rugby after an orthopedist recommended it to him to alleviate his physical discomfort. He first played for the Húsares club.

He made his international debut for Chile in 2018. He plays for Selknam in the Super Rugby Americas competition.

Inostroza featured for Chile in the American qualifiers for the 2023 World Cup. He subsequently made the Chilean squad for the 2023 Rugby World Cup in France.
