= Amato Fakatava =

Japan international rugby union player

Amato Fakatava ファカタヴァ アマト
- Born: 7 December 1994 (age 31) Nukuʻalofa, Tonga
- Height: 195 cm (6 ft 5 in)
- Weight: 118 kg (260 lb)
- School: Tonga College; Timaru Boys' High School
- University: Daito Bunka University

Rugby union career
- Position(s): Lock, Flanker, Number eight, Wing
Senior career
Years	Team	Apps	(Points)
2019–	Ricoh Black Rams	66	(85)
- Correct as of 22 April 2023
International career
Years	Team	Apps	(Points)
2023	Japan XV	2	(0)
2023–	Japan	18	(20)
- Correct as of 28 September 2023

Amato Fakatava (ファカタヴァ アマト, Fakatava Amato; born 7 December 1994) is a Japanese rugby union player. Currently playing as number eight in the back row for the Black Rams Tokyo in the Japan Rugby League One, Fakatava also represents Japan at international level.

== Early life ==
Fakatava was born on 7 December 1994 in Tonga. He attended Tonga College before being educated at Timaru Boys' High School in Timaru, Canterbury, New Zealand. After moving to Japan at 20-years-old, Fakatava studied at Daito Bunka University.

== International career ==
Fakatava made his international debut for Japan on 22 July 2023 against Samoa in the Pacific Nations Cup. Japan lost 22–24 in Sapporo.

Fakatava was announced in Japan's 2023 Rugby World Cup squad on 29 August.
