= Matías Dittus =

Chile international rugby union player

- Born: 16 July 1993 (age 33)
- Height: 182 cm (6 ft 0 in)
- Weight: 128 kg (282 lb; 20 st 2 lb)

Rugby union career
- Position: Prop
Senior career
Years	Team	Apps	(Points)
2011–22	Rugby UC		
2020–22	Selknam	19	(25)
2022–24	CA Périgueux	21	(15)
2024–Present	CA Sarlat	13	(15)
International career
Years	Team	Apps	(Points)
2019–	Chile	21	(25)

Matías Dittus (born 16 July 1993) is a Chilean rugby union player. He currently plays Prop for CA Sarlat in the French Fédérale 1 competition and for Chile internationally.

== Early career ==
Dittus started playing rugby at the age of fourteen at CS Universidad Católica.

== Professional career ==
Dittus joined Santiago based, Selknam, in 2020. He debuted for Selknam in the Super Rugby Americas competition during the 2020 season against Peñarol. In 2021, he scored his first try against Cafeteros Pro in his sides 35–12 victory, he was also given the best Chilean player award that year.

In 2022, he signed a two-year contract with French club, CA Périgueux. He debuted for the team during the second round of the Nationale 2 competition, his team won 38–18 against US Tyrosse. Later in the season, he scored his first try in the Nationale promotion quarter-final against AS Bédarrides, his side won 29–6. His club was then promoted after winning the semi-finals against Stade Métropolitain by 60–36 on aggregate. During the final in June against CS Vienne, he scored twice in his teams 39–20 victory to become the first Nationale 2 champions.

During the 2023–2024 Nationale season, he played just two games, and his contract with the club was not renewed at the end of the season. He then signed with CA Sarlat in the Fédérale 1 competition for the 2024–2025 season. He scored his first try for Sarlat against SC Tulle.

== International career ==
Dittus made his test debut for Chile during the 2019 Americas Rugby Championship against the United States, they were heavily defeated 71–8.

In 2022, he helped Chile qualify for the 2023 World Cup by scoring the winning try against the United States in the second of two- matches, and win by 52–51 on aggregate. Chile would be competing in the tournament for the first time in the country's history.

In 2023, was selected in Chile's squad to the Rugby World Cup in France. He scored his first World Cup try against Samoa, however, his side lost 10–43. Chile finished the competition fifth in their pool.
