= Clemente Saavedra =

Chile international rugby union player

- Born: 15 December 1997 (age 28)
- Height: 193 cm (6 ft 4 in)
- Weight: 110 kg (243 lb; 17 st 5 lb)

Rugby union career
- Position: Lock
Senior career
Years	Team	Apps	(Points)
2020–Present	Selknam		
2021–2022	UE Santboiana		
International career
Years	Team	Apps	(Points)
2017	Chile U20		
2019–Present	Chile	41	(0)

Clemente Saavedra (born 15 December 1997) is a Chilean rugby union player. He plays Lock for Chile at an international level, and for Selknam in the Super Rugby Americas competition. He represented Chile in the 2023 Rugby World Cup.

== Career ==
In 2020, he joined Selknam in the Super Rugby Americas competition. He played for Spanish club, UE Santboiana, in the División de Honor de Rugby for the 2021–22 season. He was named Player of the Week after his side won the championship title.

Saavedra was selected in Chile's squad for the 2023 Rugby World Cup in France. He was named as Selknam's captain for the 2024 Super Rugby Americas season.

In September 2025, he captained Chile in their Pacific-Sudamérica qualifying play-off against Samoa for the 2027 World Cup. On 22 November, he led Chile against Italy in their end-of-year international. It was his sides first time to play a tier 1 team in an international window.

== Personal life ==
He is the twin brother of fellow Chile international, Domingo Saavedra.
