= Domingo Saavedra =

Chile international rugby union player

- Full name: Domingo Saavedra Cartajena
- Born: 15 December 1997 (age 28) Santiago, Chile
- Height: 181 cm (5 ft 11 in)
- Weight: 95 kg (209 lb; 14 st 13 lb)

Rugby union career
- Position: Centre
- Current team: New Orleans Gold
Senior career
Years	Team	Apps	(Points)
2020–2023	Selknam	35	(0)
2024–	New Orleans Gold		
- Correct as of 17 March 2024
International career
Years	Team	Apps	(Points)
2017–2018	Chile U20		
2017–	Chile	28	(15)
- Correct as of 17 March 2024

Domingo Saavedra (born 15 December 1997) is a Chilean rugby union player, currently playing for the New Orleans Gold in Major League Rugby (MLR). His preferred position is centre.

== Early career ==
Saavedra is from Santiago and plays his club rugby for Old Boys. He attended The Grange School, Santiago and attended the University of Chile. His twin brother Clemente is also a Chilean international rugby union player, as was their father Emilio.

== Professional career ==
Saavedra made his professional debut for Selknam in 2020, being named in the squad for the 2020 Súper Liga Americana de Rugby season, and also represented the side in the 2021, 2022 and 2023 seasons. He joined the New Orleans Gold ahead of the 2024 Major League Rugby season.

Saavedra made his international debut for Chile in 2017 against Hong Kong. He made a further 23 appearances, before being named in the squad for the 2023 Rugby World Cup, making a further 4, 80 minutes, appearances during the tournament.
