= Sama Malolo =

Samoan rugby union player

- Born: 19 February 1998 (age 28) Auckland, New Zealand
- Height: 1.83 m (6 ft 0 in)
- Weight: 109 kg (240 lb; 17 st 2 lb)
- School: Auckland Grammar School
- University: University of Wollongong

Rugby union career
- Position: Hooker
- Current team: Moana Pasifika, Auckland
Senior career
Years	Team	Apps	(Points)
2017	Perth Spirit	7	(20)
2018	Melbourne Rebels	1	(0)
2019	Suntory Sungoliath	4	(5)
2018–2021	Southern Districts	18	(40)
2021–2022	Utah Warriors	12	(55)
2023	San Diego Legion	16	(20)
2024–	Moana Pasifika	10	(10)
2024–	Auckland	2	(0)
- Correct as of 5 November 2024
International career
Years	Team	Apps	(Points)
2018	Australia U20	1	(0)
2023–	Samoa	13	(20)
- Correct as of 5 November 2024

Sama Malolo (born 19 February 1998) is a professional rugby union player, who currently plays as a hooker for Auckland in New Zealand's domestic National Provincial Championship competition and Moana Pasifika in Super Rugby. Born in New Zealand, he represents Samoa at international level after qualifying on ancestry grounds.

== Club career ==
He previously played for Rebels in the Super Rugby competition. He also played for the Utah Warriors in Major League Rugby (MLR).

== Career statistics ==
=== Club summary ===
As of 15 July 2018

Season	Team	Games	Starts	Sub	Mins	Tries	Cons	Pens	Drops	Points	Yel	Red
2018	Rebels	1	0	1	4	0	0	0	0	0	0	0
Total		1	0	1	4	0	0	0	0	0	0	0
