= Santiago Pedrero =

Chile international rugby union player

- Born: 30 October 2000 (age 26)
- Height: 196 cm (6 ft 5 in)
- Weight: 115 kg (254 lb; 18 st 2 lb)

Rugby union career
- Position: Lock
Senior career
Years	Team	Apps	(Points)
2022–	Selknam		
International career
Years	Team	Apps	(Points)
2022–	Chile	24	(5)

Santiago Pedrero (born 30 October 2000) is a Chilean rugby union player. He plays Lock for Chile internationally, and for Selknam in the Super Rugby Americas competition. He competed for Chile in the 2023 Rugby World Cup.

== Career ==
In 2022, he joined Selknam in the Super Rugby Americas competition.

Pedrero was selected in Chile's squad for the 2023 Rugby World Cup in France.

In 2025, he was awarded the Men's Try of the Year, he scored the try against Samoa during the 2027 Rugby World Cup qualifying play-off in the United States. It was his first international try for Chile.
