= Salvador Lues =

Chile international rugby union player

- Full name: Salvador Lues Soto
- Born: 6 November 1999 (age 27) Lima, Peru
- Height: 1.79 m (5 ft 10 in)
- Weight: 118 kg (260 lb; 18 st 8 lb)

Rugby union career
- Position: Prop
- Current team: Selknam
Senior career
Years	Team	Apps	(Points)
2021–	Selknam	25	(0)
- Correct as of 28 August 2023
International career
Years	Team	Apps	(Points)
2018–	Chile	11	(5)
2020–2021	Chile XV	5	(0)
- Correct as of 28 August 2023

Salvador Lues Soto (born 6 November 1999) is a professional rugby union player who plays as a prop for Super Rugby Americas club Selknam. Born in Lima, to Chilean parents he represents Chile at international level after qualifying via rugby union eligibility rules. His parents returned to Chile following his birth and he is a homegrown Chilean rugby player.

== Club career ==
Born in Lima, Lues grew up in Santiago, where he played his rugby with the Craighouse Old Boys, before enjoying a spell in the Stade Toulousain academy from 2018 to 2020.

Back in Chile, he played with Selknam in the newly founded Súper Liga Americana de Rugby.

== International career ==
Salvador Lues was part of the Chilean team that qualified for their first Rugby World Cup in 2022, upsetting the odds against Canada and the United States, starting as a prop in the last game of the Americas qualification against the latter, an historic away win that sealed their qualification for the 2023 World Cup.
