= Martín Sigren =

Chilean rugby union player

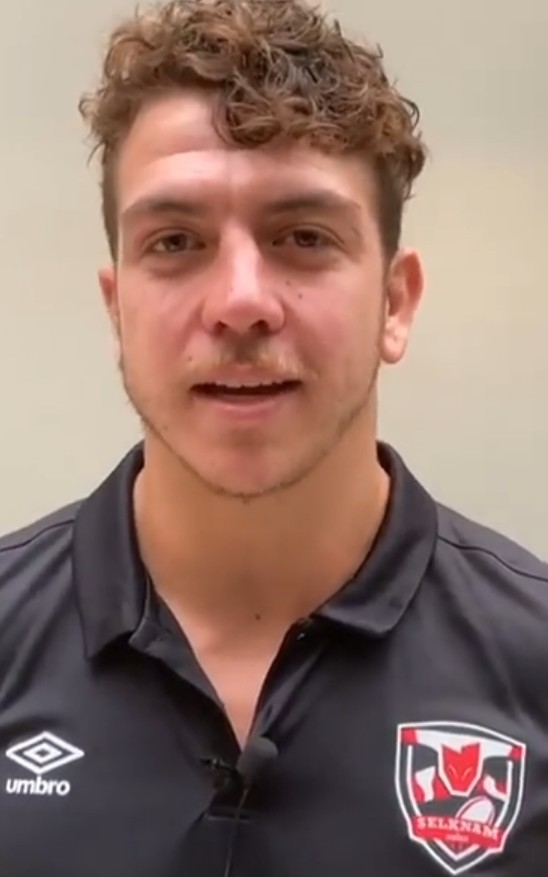
- Full name: Martín Sigren Molina
- Born: 14 May 1996 (age 30) Santiago, Chile
- Height: 1.89 m (6 ft 2 in)
- Weight: 103 kg (227 lb; 16 st 3 lb)
- University: Adolfo Ibáñez University

Rugby union career
- Position: Flanker
- Current team: New England Free Jacks
Senior career
Years	Team	Apps	(Points)
2019 –2022	Selknam	19	(5)
2022–2023	Doncaster Knights	21	(0)
2023–	New England Free Jacks	4	(0)
- Correct as of 21 April 2024
International career
Years	Team	Apps	(Points)
2016–	Chile	37	(30)
2019–2020	Chile XV	8	(10)
- Correct as of 10 September 2023

Martín Sigren Molina (born 14 May 1996) is a Chilean professional rugby union player who plays as a flanker for Major League Rugby club New England Free Jacks and captains the Chile national team.

== Early life ==
Sigren began playing rugby at school before joining local Santiago side Old Boys Club.

== Club career ==
He joined Chilean franchise Selknam in 2019 for the inaugural Superliga Americana de Rugby however only made one appearance with the season being cut short due to the COVID-19 pandemic. He led his side to the semifinals of the 2021 edition of the tournament, and the all the way to the final in 2022 losing to Uruguayan side Peñarol.

In August 2022 he signed a one year long contract with English Championship side Doncaster Knights where he became the first Chilean to play professional rugby in England.

After the 2023 Rugby World Cup he joined American MLR side New England Free Jacks.

== International career ==
He made his test debut against South Korea in 2016. He did so as a replacement for the then captain of Chile, Benjamín Soto. Sigren has since been a mainstay in the test side and has been captain since 2020. Helping lead his country to their first ever World Cup.

He has also featured for Chile XV captaining them in the Sudamericano Cuatro Naciones^{[es]} as well as a match against URC side Leinster.

== Honours ==
New England Free Jacks

- Major League Rugby Championship: 2024
