= Selknam (rugby union) =

Rugby union team in Chile

- Founded: 2019; 7 years ago
- Ground(s): Centro de Alto Rendimiento de Rugby, La Reina, Santiago Province (Capacity: 2,900)
- Coach: Jake Mangin
- Captain: Clemente Saavedra
- League: Super Rugby Americas
- 2025: 2nd Playoffs: Semi-finalist
1st kit	2nd kit

Selknam is a professional rugby union team based in Santiago, Chile. The team was founded in 2019 to compete in Súper Liga Americana de Rugby.

== History ==
The franchise was founded in November 2019 as a Chilean member of the American Super League, a South American Rugby project to professionalize rugby on the continent and with financial support from World Rugby. Its name is a tribute to the indigenous people of the Isla Grande de Tierra del Fuego, originating in present-day Chile and Argentina.

The flag of Selkʼnam people is the inspiration for the club colours

In January 2020, the first player of the franchise was confirmed, he was the captain and leader of the team, the third line Ignacio Silva. Selknam's first squad was made up of 35 players, 27 Chilean and 8 foreigners, including players from Argentina, Fiji (Vesi Rarawa) and Tonga (Johnny Ika and Latiume Fosita).

On March 4, 2020, led by Pablo Lemoine, they played the first official professional match between South American teams, against Peñarol Rugby, triumphing as a visitor by a score of 15 to 13 at the Estadio Charrúa, in Montevideo, Uruguay. On March 14, 2020, they played the first home match in their history, the rival was Ceibos from Argentina, the result was a 16-32 defeat, but the main peculiarity of that match was that for the first time the Estadio Nacional de Chile was host of a rugby match, a stadium previously used to play football. After this match the tournament was canceled by Sudamérica Rugby due to the COVID-19 pandemic .

In the second season of the league, now under the direction of Nicolás Bruzzone, the first played entirely, the team finished in third position in the regular phase, qualifying for the semifinals of the tournament where they lost 17 to 14 against Peñarol Rugby at the Estadio Charrúa in Montevideo.

In the 2022 season, they managed to beat the Argentine team, Jaguares 10. On May 27, 2022, they played their first final in the competition, losing by a score of 24 to 13 against Peñarol Rugby, the final was played at the Estadio Charrúa in Montevideo.

Since 2023, it has participated in the new Super Rugby Americas, and it is considered that the team was a fundamental pillar in the first qualification of the Chile national rugby union team to the 2023 Rugby World Cup. The 2023 season was the first in which the squad was made up exclusively of national players, in preparation for participation in the Rugby World Cup.

== Stadium ==
Selknam's home stadium since 2025 is the venue located in "Centro de Alto Rendimiento de Rugby" (CARR), a facility sited in La Reina, Santiago Province. Inaugurated in 2023, CARR has an artificial turf field, lighting system, and capacity for 2,900 spectators.

At the beginning of the franchise, it was expected Selknam would play at Estadio Santiago Bueras, home to Chile national rugby team. with the squad training at CAR Feruchi Rugby as of mid-January Nevertheless, on 2 March 2020 it was confirmed that Selknam will play the opening game of the 2020 season at the Estadio Nacional Julio Martínez Prádanos. Selknam played there until 2025.

== Current squad ==
The Selknam squad for the 2026 Super Rugby Americas season is:

2026 Selknam squad
**Props**: (Chile) **Norman Aguayo**; (Chile) Benjamín Canales; (Chile) **Javier Carrasco**; (Chile) Baltazar Gurruchaga; (Chile) **Iñaki Gurruchaga**; (Chile) Max Kennedy; (Chile) **Salvador Lues**; (Chile) Emilio Shea; (Argentina) Nicolás Triviño; **Hookers**: (Chile) **Augusto Böhme**; (Chile) **Jorge Delgado**; (Chile) Benjamín Moreno; (Chile) Cristóbal Soto; **Locks**: (Chile) **Santiago Pedrero**; (Chile) **Bruno Sáez**; (Chile) Max Schlesinger; (Argentina) Agustín Toth; (Chile) **Santiago Valenzuela**	**Back row**: (Chile) **Alfonso Escobar**; (Chile) **Raimundo Martínez**; (Chile) **Joaquín Milesi**; (Argentina) Santiago Montagner; (Chile) **Clemente Saavedra** **(c)**; (Chile) **Martín Sigren**; (Chile) **Ernesto Tchimino**; (Chile) **Augusto Villanueva**; **Scrum-halves**: (Chile) **Lucas Berti**; (Chile) **Sebastián Bianchi**; (Chile) **Marcelo Torrealba**; (Chile) **Benjamín Videla**; (Chile) Santiago Wood; **Fly-halves**: (Chile) José Tomás Bonilla; (Chile) **Rodrigo Fernández**; (Chile) **Juan Cruz Reyes**; (Chile) **Tomás Salas**	**Centres**: (Chile) **Clemente Armstrong**; (Chile) Álvaro Castro; (Chile) **Matías Garafulic**; (Chile) **Gonzalo Lara**; (Chile) **Nicolás Saab**; (Chile) **Domingo Saavedra**; **Wings**: (Chile) Manuel Bustamante; (Chile) Antonio Corbella; (Chile) **Cristóbal Game Jiménez**; (Chile) **Nicolás Garafulic**; (Chile) Federico Kennedy; **Fullbacks**: (Chile) Felipe Méndez; (Chile) **Luca Strabucchi**
**(c)** denotes the team captain. **Bold** denotes internationally capped players. * denotes players qualified to play for Chile on residency or dual nationality. Source:
