= 2026 World Rugby Nations Cup Americas-Pacific Series =

International rugby union tournament

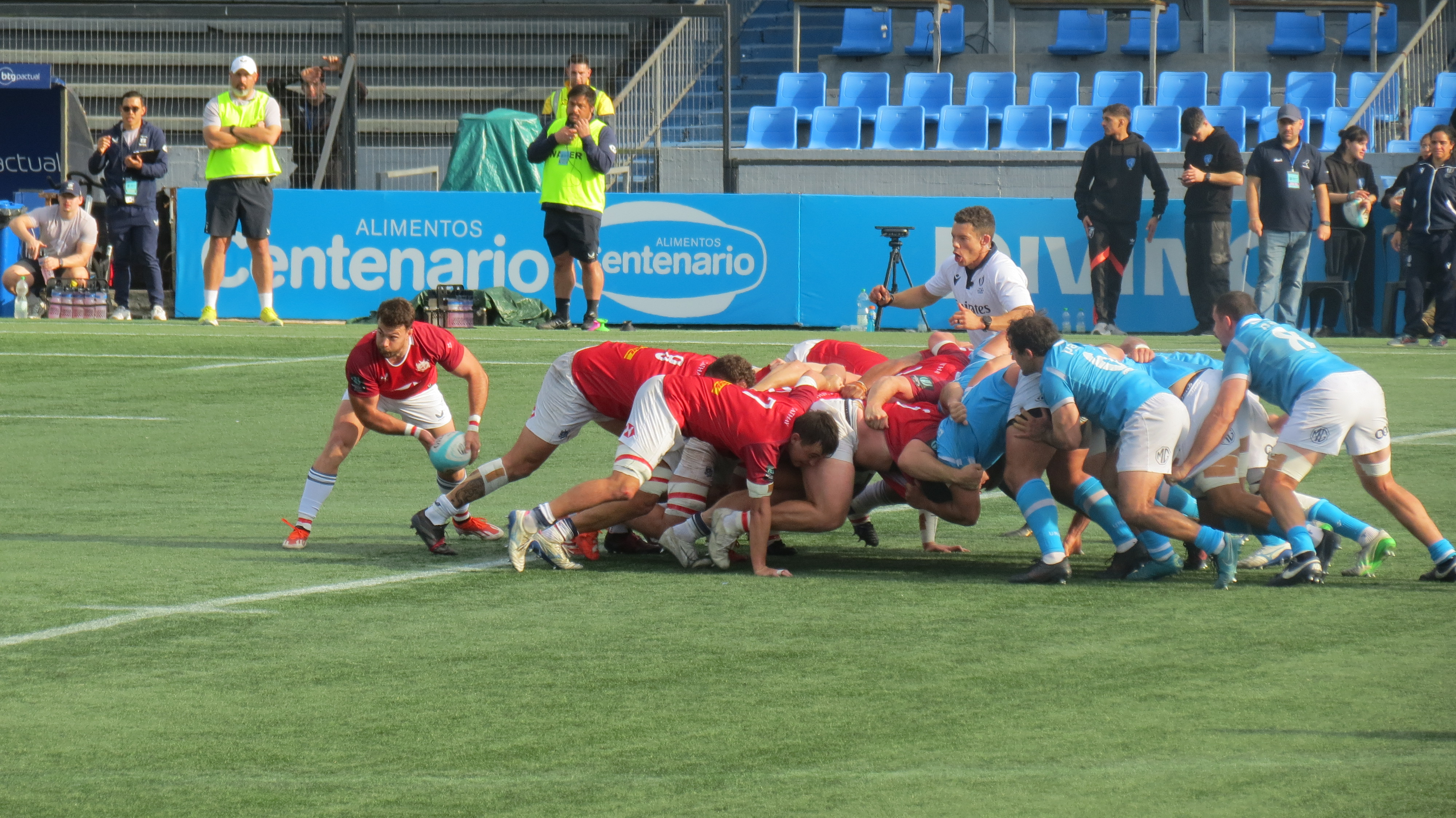
Uruguay v Hong Kong at Estadio Charrúa

The 2026 World Rugby Nations Cup Americas-Pacific Series was the first phase of matches (rounds 1–3) of the inaugural edition of the World Rugby Nations Cup, the second tier of a biennial international men's rugby union competition, predominantly made of Tier 2 nations from Africa, Americas North, Asia, Europe and Sudamérica.

The Americas-Pacific Series took place between 4 July and 18 July, during the July International window. The matches replaced the traditional tour matches between the traditional travelling European sides to the various Tier 2 nations around the world.

== Championship division: Tables ==
The below shows the tables for the two conferences.

=== Americas-Pacific pool ===
Pos	Team	Pld	W	D	L	PF	PA	PD	TF	TA	TB	LB	Pts
1	United States	3	3	0	0	90	66	+24	11	9	2	0	14
2	Chile	3	2	0	1	108	97	+11	15	6	2	0	10
3	Samoa	3	1	0	2	115	90	+25	16	12	2	1	7
4	Tonga	3	1	0	2	83	90	−7	12	13	2	1	7
5	Canada	3	1	1	1	79	99	−20	10	15	1	0	7
6	Uruguay	3	0	1	2	110	119	−9	17	20	3	2	7

Updated to match(es) played on 11 July 2026. Source: Nations Cup

=== European-African-Asian pool ===
Pos	Team	Pld	W	D	L	PF	PA	PD	TF	TA	TB	LB	Pts
1	Georgia	3	3	0	0	123	68	+55	8	15	2	0	14
2	Portugal	3	2	0	1	99	72	+27	15	9	3	1	12
3	Romania	3	1	1	1	105	121	−16	15	16	3	0	9
4	Spain	3	1	1	1	96	90	+6	13	13	2	1	9
5	Hong Kong	3	1	0	2	78	144	−66	10	15	1	0	5
6	Zimbabwe	3	0	0	3	60	90	−30	9	11	1	1	2

Updated to match(es) played on 11 July 2026. Source: Nations Cup

== Fixtures ==
Matches were held in the Americas region, with Samoa playing their matches in South America and Tonga playing their matches in North America. Each of the European visiting teams played all their matches in either North America or all in South America to reduce travel. Fixtures and venues were announced by World Rugby on 31 March 2026.

=== Round 1 ===
==== Uruguay v Georgia ====
4 July 2026
14:00 UYT (UTC−03)

(2 BP) Uruguay	34–41	Georgia (1 BP)
Try: Myszka 8' m J. Gonzalez 40' c Arcos Perez 45' c Manuel Alonso 70' c Rodríguez Bosch 83' m Con: Cotarmanac'h (3/5) 42', 45', 72'; Pen: Cotarmanac'h (1/1) 30'	Report	Try: Matkava 15' c Sutidze 23' c Jalagonia 53' c Penalty try 67'; Alania 79' c Con: Matkava (4/4) 16', 24', 54', 80'; Pen: Matkava (2/2) 19', 26'

Estadio Charrúa, Montevideo
Attendance: 1,000
Referee: Craig Evans (Wales)

Uruguay	Georgia

FB	15	Francisco Gonzalez Capdevila
RW	14	Juan Gonzalez
OC	13	Felipe Arcos Perez
IC	12	Juan Manuel Alonso
LW	11	Ignacio Alvarez Akiki		(substituted off) 51'	(substituted on) 60'
FH	10	Jean Cotarmanac'h
SH	9	Joaquin Suarez		(substituted off) 63'
N8	8	Manuel Diana
OF	7	Lucas Bianchi
BF	6	Manuel Ardao	(yellow card) 67'
RL	5	Felipe Aliaga (c)
LL	4	Ignacio Dotti		(substituted off) 69'
TP	3	Reinaldo Piussi
HK	2	Joaquin Myszka	(yellow card) 49'			(substituted off) 63'
LP	1	Mateo Sanguinetti		(substituted off) 51'
Substitutions:
HK	16	Germán Kigel		(substituted on) 51'	(substituted off) 60'	(substituted on) 63'
PR	17	Mateo Perillo		(substituted on) 51'
PR	18	Lucas Porcelli
LK	19	Manuel Rosmarino		(substituted on) 69'
BR	20	Arturo Ten Hoever
SH	21	Ignacio Rodríguez Bosch		(substituted on) 63'
FB	22	Francisco Landauer
CE	23	Alfonso Vidal
Coach:
Rodolfo Ambrosio

FB	15	Luka Tsirekidze
RW	14	Akaki Tabutsadze
OC	13	Davit Niniashvili (c)	(yellow card) 40'	(substituted off) 13'	(substituted on) 26'	(substituted off) 80+1'
IC	12	Giorgi Kveseladze
LW	11	Roma Makhatadze
FH	10	Luka Matkava
SH	9	Vasil Lobzhanidze		(substituted off) 69'
N8	8	Tornike Jalagonia
OF	7	Luka Ivanishvili		(substituted off) 39'	(substituted on) 40'	(substituted off) 69'
BF	6	Beka Shvangiradze
RL	5	Konstantin Mikautadze		(substituted off) 51'
LL	4	Mikheil Babunashvili		(substituted off) 77'
TP	3	Alexsandre Kuntelia		(substituted off) 51'
HK	2	Nikoloz Sutidze		(substituted off) 51'
LP	1	Giorgi Akhaladze		(substituted off) 51'
Substitutions:
HK	16	Luka Petriashvili		(substituted on) 51'
PR	17	Nika Abuladze		(substituted on) 51'
PR	18	Bachuki Tchumbadze		(substituted on) 51'
LK	19	Lado Chachanidze		(substituted on) 77'
LK	20	Giorgi Javakhia		(substituted on) 51'
BR	21	Ilia Spanderashvili		(substituted on) 39'	(substituted off) 40'	(substituted on) 69'
SH	22	Mikheil Alania		(substituted on) 69'
CE	23	Tornike Kakhoidze		(substituted on) 13'	(substituted off) 26'	(substituted on) 80+1'
Coach:
Pierre-Henry Broncan

Assistant referees:
Tomas Ninci (Argentina)
Federico Longobardi (Argentina)
Television match official:
Dan Jones (England)

Notes:

- Germán Kigel, Ignacio Rodríguez Bosch (both Uruguay) and Roma Makhatadze (Georgia) made their international debuts.
- Tornike Jalagonia (Georgia) earned his 50th test cap.
- This was the first time Georgia has beaten Uruguay in Uruguay.

==== Samoa v Hong Kong ====
4 July 2026
15:00 CLST (UTC−04)

(1 BP) Samoa	66–19	Hong Kong
Try: Tuitama 2' c Seiuli 8' c Faiʻilagi 17' m Solomona (2) 20' c, 36' m Boyle-Tiatia 31' c Mapu 61' c Tupai 64' c Alofipo (2) 77' c, 80' c Con: Alatimu (8/10) 2', 9', 20', 32', 62', 65', 77', 81'	Report	Try: Penalty try 28'; Ramage 50' m Sayers 57' m Con: Altier (1/2) 51'

Estadio Nacional Julio Martinez Pradanos, Santiago (Chile)
Attendance: 15,972 (Note: Combined attendance for Samoa v Hong Kong & Chile v Romania, which was both hosted at the same venue.)
Referee: Angus Mabey (New Zealand)

Samoa	Hong Kong

FB	15	Latrell Smiler-Ah Kiong
RW	14	Warren Solomona
OC	13	Duncan Paia'aua		(substituted off) 63'
IC	12	Peter Umaga-Jensen
LW	11	Tuna Tuitama		(substituted off) 66'
FH	10	AJ Alatimu
SH	9	Joel Lam	(yellow card) 28'	(substituted off) 51'
N8	8	Iakopo Mapu
OF	7	Alamanda Motuga
BF	6	Miracle Faiʻilagi (c)		(substituted off) 51'	(substituted on) 62'
RL	5	Sam Slade
LL	4	Ben Nee-Nee		(substituted off) 63'
TP	3	Marco Fepulea'i		(substituted off) 51'
HK	2	Manaaki Boyle-Tiatia		(substituted off) 51'
LP	1	Aki Seiuli		(substituted off) 51'
Substitutions:
FL	16	Pita Anae Ah-Sue		(substituted on) 51'
PR	17	Jarred Adams		(substituted on) 51'
PR	18	Jeffery Toomaga-Allen		(substituted on) 51'
LK	19	Taeao Pomale-Time		(substituted on) 63'
BR	20	Niko Jones		(substituted on) 51'	(substituted off) 62'
SH	21	Connor Tupai		(substituted on) 51'
WG	22	Taunu'u Niulevaea		(substituted on) 66'
WG	23	Elisapeta Alofipo		(substituted on) 63'
Coach:
Tusi Pisi

FB	15	Paul Altier
RW	14	Marcus Ramage		(substituted off) 66'
OC	13	Maxwell Threlkeld
IC	12	Matteo Avitabile
LW	11	Harry Sayers
FH	10	Joe Barker	(yellow card) 40'	(substituted off) 62'
SH	9	Jack Combes		(substituted off) 68'
N8	8	James Sawyer		(substituted off) 70'
OF	7	Pierce MacKinlay-West (c)
BF	6	Tyler McNutt
RL	5	Kyle Sullivan
LL	4	Maximilian Murphy		(substituted off) 51'
TP	3	Keelan Chapman		(substituted off) 61'
HK	2	Harry Baron		(substituted off) 23'
LP	1	Rory Cinnamond		(substituted off) 77'
Substitutions:
HK	16	Alexander Post		(substituted on) 23'
PR	17	James Holmes		(substituted on) 77'
PR	18	Sunia Fameitau		(substituted on) 61'
LK	19	Lachlan Doheny		(substituted on) 51'
BR	20	Dana Fourie		(substituted on) 70'
SH	21	Eric Chui Wai Lap		(substituted on) 68'
WG	22	Isaac Campbell-Wu		(substituted on) 66'
FB	23	Matt Worley		(substituted on) 62'
Coach:
Logan Asplin

Assistant referees:
Jordan Way (Australia)
Caua Ricardo (Brazil)
Television match official:
Tual Trainini (France)

Notes:

- Manaaki Boyle-Tiatia, Taeao Pomale-Time, Taunu'u Niulevaea, Warren Solomona, Peter Umaga-Jensen (all Samoa), Isaac Campbell-Wu and Lachlan Doheny (both Hong Kong) made their international debuts.
- This was the first meeting between the two teams.

==== Chile v Romania ====
4 July 2026
18:00 CLST (UTC−04)

(1 BP) Chile	48–31	Romania (1 BP)
Try: Berti 14' c Carrasco 29' c Martinez (2) 43' c, 63' c Escobar (2) 48' c, 71' c Con: Garafulic (4/4) 15', 30', 44', 49'; Videla (2/2) 64', 72'; Pen: Garafulic (2/2) 11', 34'	Report	Try: Emanuel Mitu 19' c Buruiana 25' c Raymond Schwartz 42' c Simionescu 58' c Con: Rupanu (4/4) 19', 26', 43', 59'; Pen: Rupanu (1/2) 39'

Estadio Nacional Julio Martinez Pradanos, Santiago
Attendance: 15,972 (Note: Combined attendance for Samoa v Hong Kong & Chile v Romania, which was both hosted at the same venue.)
Referee: Damián Schneider (Argentina)

Chile	Romania

FB	15	Cristóbal Game Jiménez		(substituted off) 31'
RW	14	Manuel Bustamante
OC	13	Matías Garafulic	(yellow card) 57'
IC	12	Domingo Saavedra
LW	11	Nicolás Saab
FH	10	Rodrigo Fernández		(substituted off) 23'
SH	9	Lucas Berti		(substituted off) 52'
N8	8	Ernesto Tchimino
OF	7	Raimundo Martínez
BF	6	Martín Sigren (c)
RL	5	Javier Eissmann		(substituted off) 72'
LL	4	Santiago Pedrero
TP	3	Iñaki Gurruchaga		(substituted off) 57'
HK	2	Diego Escobar		(substituted off) 75'
LP	1	Javier Carrasco		(substituted off) 57'
Substitutions:
HK	16	Jorge Delgado		(substituted on) 75'
PR	17	Emilio Shea		(substituted on) 57'
PR	18	Matías Dittus		(substituted on) 57'
LK	19	Max Schlesinger		(substituted on) 72'
BR	20	Clemente Saavedra		(substituted on) 41'
SH	21	Marcelo Torrealba		(substituted on) 52'
FH	22	Santiago Videla		(substituted on) 23'
WG	23	Clemente Armstrong		(substituted on) 31'	(substituted off) 41'
Coach:
Pablo Lemoine

FB	15	Marius Simionescu
RW	14	Nicholas Onutu	(yellow card) 42'	(substituted off) 49'
OC	13	Dylan Schwartz		(substituted off) 75'
IC	12	Jason Tomane		(substituted off) 73'
LW	11	Iliesa Tiqe
FH	10	Daniel Plai
SH	9	Gabriel Rupanu		(substituted off) 60'
N8	8	Adrian Emanuel Mitu
OF	7	Cristi Boboc (c)
BF	6	Kemal Altinok		(substituted off) 68'
RL	5	Andrei Mahu	(yellow card) 47'
LL	4	Nicolaas Immelman		(substituted off) 57'
TP	3	Jean-Pierre Smith		(substituted off) 54'
HK	2	Ștefan Buruiană		(substituted off) 54'
LP	1	Alexandru Savin		(substituted off) 54'
Substitutions:
HK	16	Tudor Butnariu		(substituted on) 54'
PR	17	Iulian Hartig		(substituted on) 54'
PR	18	Cosmin Manole		(substituted on) 54'
LK	19	Logan Weidner		(substituted on) 57'
BR	20	Keanan Murray		(substituted on) 68'
SH	21	Alin Conache		(substituted on) 60'
CE	22	Mihai Graure		(substituted on) 73'
WG	23	Damian Bonaparte		(substituted on) 49'
Coach:
David Gérard

Assistant referees:
Jordan Way (Australia)
Caua Ricardo (Brazil)
Television match official:
Tual Trainini (France)

Notes:

- Manuel Bustamante, Max Schlesinger, Emilio Shea (all Chile) and Jean-Pierre Smith (Romania) made their international debuts.

==== Tonga v Zimbabwe ====
4 July 2026
16:15 MDT (UTC−06)

(1 BP) Tonga	36–26	Zimbabwe (1 BP)
Try: Veainu 24' c Paea 28' m Inisi 38' c Moli 69' c Tuipolotu 72' c Con: Pellegrini (3/4) 25', 39', 74'; Havili (1/1) 70'; Pen: Pellegrini (1/1) 80'	Report	Try: Mandioma 31' m Mavesere 56' c Muzanargwo 59' c Sigauke 65' c Con: Prior (3/4) 57', 60', 66'

Dick's Sporting Goods Park, Commerce City (United States)
Attendance: 10,500 (Note: Combined attendance for Tonga v Zimbabwe & USA v Portugal which was both hosted at the same venue.)
Referee: Ben Breakspear (Wales)

Tonga	Zimbabwe

FB	15	William Havili
RW	14	Taniela Filimone
OC	13	John Tapueluelu		(substituted off) 70'
IC	12	Fine Inisi
LW	11	Telusa Veainu	(yellow card) 33'	(substituted off) 54'
FH	10	Patrick Pellegrini	(yellow card) 60'
SH	9	Sonatane Takulua(c)		(substituted off) 54'
N8	8	Otunuku Pauta
OF	7	Semisi Paea		(substituted off) 70'
BF	6	Sam Tuitupou
RL	5	Veikoso Poloniati
LL	4	Jimmy Tupou		(substituted off) 76'
TP	3	Atu Moli		(substituted off) 50'
HK	2	Sam Moli		(substituted off) 70'
LP	1	Fatongia Paea		(substituted off) 50'
Substitutions:
HK	16	Sekope Lopeti-Moli		(substituted on) 70'
PR	17	Siegfried Fisiʻihoi		(substituted on) 50'
PR	18	Paula Latu		(substituted on) 50'
LK	19	Mahonri Ngakuru		(substituted on) 76'
BR	20	Sione Tuipulotu		(substituted on) 70'
SH	21	Siaosi Nginingini		(substituted on) 54'
CE	22	Solomone Kata		(substituted on) 54'
WG	23	Anzelo Tuitavuki		(substituted on) 70'
Coach:
Tevita Tuʻifua

FB	15	Tapiwa Mafura
RW	14	Trevor Gurwe
OC	13	Brandon Mudzekenyedzi
IC	12	Kudzai Mashawi		(substituted off) 50'
LW	11	Edward Sigauke		(substituted off) 68'
FH	10	Ian Prior
SH	9	Hilton Mudariki (c)		(substituted off) 48'
N8	8	Jason Fraser	(yellow card) 78'
OF	7	Dylan Utete		(substituted off) 46'
BF	6	Tinotenda Mavesere
RL	5	Godfrey Muzanargwo
LL	4	Gary Porter		(substituted off) 61'
TP	3	Michael Kumbirai		(substituted off) 44'
HK	2	Matthew Mandioma		(substituted off) 69'
LP	1	Victor Mupunga		(substituted off) 70'
Substitutions:
HK	16	Bryan Chiang		(substituted on) 69'
PR	17	Tjide Visser		(substituted on) 70'
PR	18	Cleopas Kundiona		(substituted on) 44'
LK	19	Tadiwanashe Gwashu		(substituted on) 61'
BR	20	Simba Siraha		(substituted on) 46'
BR	21	Dion Khumalo		(substituted on) 68'
FH	22	Bruce Houston		(substituted on) 50'
SH	23	Tyrone Gombe		(substituted on) 48'
Coach:
Pieter Benade

Assistant referees:
Jérémy Rozier (France)
Robin Kaluzniak (Canada)
Television match official:
Adam Jones (Wales)

Notes:

- Atu Moli, Mahonri Ngakuru, Otunuku Pauta, Sam Tuitupou, Jimmy Tupou (all Tonga), Tyrone Gombe, Michael Kumbirai, Gary Porter and Tjide Visser (all Zimbabwe) made their international debuts.

==== United States v Portugal ====
4 July 2026
19:00 MDT (UTC−06)

United States	30–29	Portugal (2 BP)
Try: Daniel 14' c Ryan 29' c Besag 41' c Con: Hilsenbeck (3/3) 15', 30', 42'; Pen: Hilsenbeck (3/3) 55', 61', 79'	Report	Try: M. Pinto (4) 2', 9', 24', 63'; Con: Marques (2/3) 10', 25'; Aubry (1/1) 64'; Pen: Marques (1/1) 50'

Dick's Sporting Goods Park, Commerce City
Attendance: 10,500 (Note: Combined attendance for Tonga v Zimbabwe & USA v Portugal which was both hosted at the same venue.)
Referee: Gianluca Gnecchi (Italy)

United States	Portugal

FB	15	Mitch Wilson
RW	14	Rufus McLean		(substituted off) 62'
OC	13	Tavite Lopeti	(yellow card) 17'
IC	12	Dominic Besag
LW	11	Perry Mayo
FH	10	Christopher Hilsenbeck
SH	9	Ruben de Haas
N8	8	Paddy Ryan
OF	7	Cory Daniel		(substituted off) 57'
BF	6	Benjamín Bonasso
RL	5	Jason Damm (c)
LL	4	Nathan Den Hoedt		(substituted off) 54'
TP	3	Tonga Kofe		(substituted off) 62'
HK	2	Kapeli Pifeleti		(substituted off) 66'
LP	1	Jack Iscaro		(substituted off) 66'
Substitutions:
HK	16	Shilo Klein		(substituted on) 66'
PR	17	Ezekiel Lindenmuth		(substituted on) 66'
PR	18	Mason Pedersen		(substituted on) 62'
LK	19	Brandon Harvey		(substituted on) 54'
BR	20	Nafi Ma'afu		(substituted on) 57'
SH	21	Ethan McVeigh
FH	22	Luke Carty
CE	23	Julian Roberts		(substituted on) 62'
Coach:
Scott Lawrence

FB	15	Vincent Pinto
RW	14	Raffaele Storti
OC	13	Guilherme Vasconcelos
IC	12	Tomás Appleton		(substituted off) 38'	(substituted on) 40'
LW	11	Manuel Cardoso Pinto
FH	10	Manuel Vareiro	(red card) 32'
SH	9	Samuel Marques		(substituted off) 62'
N8	8	José Monteiro
OF	7	João Granate		(substituted off) 57'
BF	6	José Madeira (c)
RL	5	Duarte Torgal		(substituted off) 57'
LL	4	Martim Bello	(yellow card) 28'	(substituted off) 62'
TP	3	António Prim		(substituted off) 68'
HK	2	Luka Begic		(substituted off) 35'
LP	1	Luís Lopes		(substituted off) 54'
Substitutions:
HK	16	Nuno Mascarenhas		(substituted on) 51'
PR	17	Pedro Vicente	(red card) 65'	(substituted on) 54'
PR	18	Cody Thomas		(substituted on) 35'
LK	19	Guilherme Costa		(substituted on) 62'
BR	20	André da Cunha		(substituted on) 57'
SH	21	Hugo Camacho		(substituted on) 62'
FH	22	Hugo Aubry
CE	23	Martim Faro		(substituted on) 38'	(substituted off) 40'
Coach:
Simon Mannix

Assistant referees:
Jérémy Rozier (France)
Robin Kaluzniak (Canada)
Television match official:
Adam Jones (Wales)

Notes:

- Nathan Den Hoedt, Perry Mayo Mason Pedersen and Julian Roberts (all USA) made their international debuts.

==== Canada v Spain ====
4 July 2026
19:00 MDT (UTC−06)

(1 BP) Canada	42–42	Spain (1 BP)
Try: Flesch (2) 9'c, 41' c Higgins 17' c Ardron 46' c Quattrin 57' c Tremblay 82' c Con: Nelson (4/4) 10', 17', 42', 47'; Coats (1/1) 58'; McMullin (1/1) 84'	Report	Try: Carmona 3' c Suárez 12' c Bay (2) 22' c, 42' c Tabarot 69' c Aurrekoetxea 78' c Con: López-Bontempo (6/6) 4', 13', 23', 43', 70', 79'

Clarke Stadium, Edmonton
Attendance: 3,476
Referee: Tomás Bertazza (Argentina)

Canada	Spain

FB	15	Peter Nelson	(substituted off) 54'
RW	14	Kyle Tremblay
OC	13	Spencer Jones
IC	12	Josh McIndoe
LW	11	Noah Flesch
FH	10	Cooper Coats
SH	9	Jason Higgins	(substituted off) 67'
N8	8	Tyler Ardron
OF	7	Lucas Rumball
BF	6	Mason Flesch
RL	5	Izzak Kelly	(substituted off) 78'
LL	4	Piers von Dadelszen
TP	3	Cole Keith	(substituted off) 63'
HK	2	Andrew Quattrin (c)	(substituted off) 75'
LP	1	Cali Martinez	(substituted off) 63'
Substitutions:
HK	16	Dewald Kotze	(substituted on) 75'
PR	17	Sam Miller	(substituted on) 63'
PR	18	Kyle Steeves	(substituted on) 63'
LK	19	Daragh Doyle
BR	20	Siôn Parry	(substituted on) 78'
SH	21	Brock Gallagher	(substituted on) 67'
FH	22	Jacob Ince
WG	23	Takoda McMullin	(substituted on) 54'
Coach:
Steve Meehan

FB	15	JW Bell
RW	14	Gauthier Minguillon		(substituted off) 57'
OC	13	Martiniano Cian
IC	12	Álvar Gimeno		(substituted off) 63'
LW	11	Alberto Carmona
FH	10	Gonzalo López-Bontempo
SH	9	Estanislao Bay		(substituted off) 67'
N8	8	Ekain Imaz	(yellow card) 61'
OF	7	Vicente Boronat		(substituted off) 55'
BF	6	Ignacio Piñeiro
RL	5	Antonio Suárez		(substituted off) 60'
LL	4	Matthew Foulds
TP	3	Jon Zabala (c)		(substituted off) 57'
HK	2	Santiago Ovejero		(substituted off) 50'
LP	1	Thierry Futeu		(substituted off) 67'
Substitutions:
HK	16	Álvaro García		(substituted on) 50'
PR	17	Luca Tabarot		(substituted on) 67'
PR	18	Hugo Pirlet		(substituted on) 57'
LK	19	Imanol Urraza		(substituted on) 60'
BR	20	Manex Ariceta		(substituted on) 55'
SH	21	Kerman Aurrekoetxea		(substituted on) 67'
CE	22	Iñaki Mateu		(substituted on) 63'
WG	23	Jaime Manteca		(substituted on) 57'
Coach:
Pablo Bouza

Assistant referees:
Mike Lawrenson (United States)
Derek Summers (United States)
Television match official:
Dan Jones (England)

Notes:

- Josh McIndoe (Canada) and Jaime Manteca (Spain) made their international debuts.
- The combined 84 points scored set a new record for the highest-scoring draw in Test rugby, surpassing the previous record of 76 points between England and Scotland in their 38-all draw in 2019.

=== Round 2 ===
==== Uruguay v Romania ====
11 July 2026
14:00 UYT (UTC–3)

(1 BP) Uruguay	36–36	Romania (1 BP)
Try: Perez 2' c Suarez 19' m Myszka (3) 23' m, 53' m, 64' c Ardao 72' c Con: Cotarmanac'h (3/6) 3', 65', 73'	Report	Try: Tiqe 8' c Manumua (2) 12' m, 68' c Weidner 17' c Buruiană 49' c Con: Conache (4/5) 9', 18', 49', 69'; Pen: Conache (1/2) 7'

Estadio Charrúa, Montevideo
Attendance: 1,000
Referee: Jordan Way (Australia)

Uruguay	Romania

FB	15	Juan Gonzalez	(substituted off) 70'
RW	14	Francisco Gonzalez Capdevila
OC	13	Felipe Arcos Perez	(substituted off) 66'
IC	12	Juan Manuel Alonso
LW	11	Ignacio Alvarez Akiki
FH	10	Jean Cotarmanac'h
SH	9	Joaquin Suarez
N8	8	Manuel Diana
OF	7	Lucas Bianchi
BF	6	Manuel Ardao
RL	5	Felipe Aliaga (c)
LL	4	Ignacio Dotti	(substituted off) 70'
TP	3	Reinaldo Piussi
HK	2	Joaquin Myszka	(substituted off) 73'
LP	1	Mateo Sanguinetti	(substituted off) 40'
Substitutions:
HK	16	Germán Kigel	(substituted on) 73'
PR	17	Mateo Perillo	(substituted on) 40'
PR	18	Lucas Porcelli
LK	19	Manuel Rosmarino	(substituted on) 70'
BR	20	Arturo Ten Hoever
SH	21	Ignacio Rodríguez Bosch
FB	22	Francisco Landauer	(substituted on) 70'
CE	23	Alfonso Vidal	(substituted on) 66'
Coach:
Rodolfo Ambrosio

FB	15	Marius Simionescu
RW	14	Tevita Manumua
OC	13	Nicholas Onutu		(substituted off) 69'
IC	12	Jason Tomane		(substituted off) 59'
LW	11	Iliesa Tiqe
FH	10	Hinckley Vaovasa
SH	9	Alin Conache
N8	8	Adrian Mitu		(substituted off) 66'
OF	7	Cristi Boboc (c)
BF	6	Nicolaas Immelman		(substituted off) 58'
RL	5	Andrei Mahu		(substituted off) 58'
LL	4	Logan Weidner
TP	3	Cosmin Manole		(substituted off) 52'
HK	2	Ștefan Buruiană		(substituted off) 63'
LP	1	Iulian Hartig		(substituted off) 57'
Substitutions:
HK	16	Tudor Butnariu		(substituted on) 63'
PR	17	Alexandru Savin	(yellow card) 64'	(substituted on) 57'
PR	18	Jean-Pierre Smith		(substituted on) 52'
BR	19	Vlad Neculau	(yellow card) 70'	(substituted on) 58'
BR	20	Keanan Murray		(substituted on) 58'
BR	21	Iacopo Bianchi		(substituted on) 66'
SH	22	Gabriel Rupanu		(substituted on) 69'
CE	23	Mihai Graure		(substituted on) 59'
Coach:
David Gérard

Assistant referees:
Angus Mabey (New Zealand)
Caua Ricardo (Brazil)
Television match official:
Dan Jones (England)

Notes:

- Francisco Landauer, Alfonso Vidal (both Uruguay) and Iacopo Bianchi (Romania) made their international debuts.

==== Samoa v Georgia ====
11 July 2026
15:00 CLST (UTC–4)

Samoa	12–33	Georgia
Try: Paia'aua 26' c Asiata 50' m Con: Alatimu (1/2) 27'	Report	Try: Ivanishvili 38' c Kveseladze 47' c Spanderashvili 80+2' c Con: Matkava (2/2) 39', 48'; Abzhandadze (1/1) 80+3'; Pen: Matkava (4/4) 5', 9', 25', 77'

Estadio Sausalito, Vina del Mar (Chile)
Attendance: 12,872 (Note: Combined attendance for Samoa v Georgia & Chile v Hong Kong, which was both hosted at the same venue.)
Referee: Craig Evans (Wales)

Samoa	Georgia

FB	15	Latrell Smiler-Ah Kiong
RW	14	Warren Solomona
OC	13	Duncan Paia'aua
IC	12	Peter Umaga-Jensen
LW	11	Tuna Tuitama		(substituted off) 51'
FH	10	AJ Alatimu		(substituted off) 71'
SH	9	Ere Enari		(substituted off) 61'
N8	8	Iakopo Mapu		(substituted off) 61'
OF	7	Alamanda Motuga		(substituted off) 62'	(substituted on) 72'
BF	6	Miracle Faiʻilagi (c)
RL	5	Sam Slade		(substituted off) 69'
LL	4	Ben Nee-Nee
TP	3	Marco Fepulea'i		(substituted off) 11'	(substituted on) 23'	(substituted off) 48'
HK	2	Manaaki Boyle-Tiatia		(substituted off) 41'
LP	1	Aki Seiuli	(yellow card) 61'		(substituted off) 72'
Substitutions:
HK	16	Richie Asiata		(substituted on) 41'
PR	17	Jarred Adams		(substituted on) 62'
PR	18	Jeffery Toomaga-Allen		(substituted on) 11'	(substituted off) 23'	(substituted on) 48'
LK	19	Jay Tuivaiti		(substituted on) 19'
BR	20	Abraham Papali'i		(substituted on) 61'
SH	21	Connor Tupai		(substituted on) 61'
FH	22	Rodney Iona		(substituted on) 71'
WG	23	Elisapeta Alofipo		(substituted on) 51'
Coach:
Tusi Pisi

FB	15	Davit Niniashvili (c)
RW	14	Akaki Tabutsadze
OC	13	Giorgi Shvelidze
IC	12	Tornike Kakhoidze
LW	11	Giorgi Kveseladze
FH	10	Luka Matkava		(substituted off) 78'
SH	9	Vasil Lobzhanidze		(substituted off) 61'
N8	8	Tornike Jalagonia		(substituted off) 64'
OF	7	Luka Ivanishvili	(yellow card) 13'	(substituted off) 69'
BF	6	Beka Shvangiradze
RL	5	Giorgi Javakhia		(substituted off) 52'
LL	4	Mikheil Babunashvili	(yellow card) 40+1'
TP	3	Bachuki Tchumbadze		(substituted off) 55'
HK	2	Nikoloz Sutidze		(substituted off) 55'
LP	1	Giorgi Akhaladze		(substituted off) 51'
Substitutions:
HK	16	Vakhtang Jincharadze		(substituted on) 55'
PR	17	Nika Abuladze		(substituted on) 61'
PR	18	Alexsandre Kuntelia		(substituted on) 55'
LK	19	Lado Chachanidze		(substituted on) 52'
BR	20	Ilia Spanderashvili		(substituted on) 69'
BR	21	Ioane Iashaghashvili		(substituted on) 64'
SH	22	Mikheil Alania		(substituted on) 61'
FH	23	Tedo Abzhandadze		(substituted on) 78'
Coach:
Pierre-Henry Broncan

Assistant referees:
Federico Longobardi (Argentina)
Esteban Filipanics (Argentina)
Television match official:
Leo Colgan (Ireland)

Notes:

- Richie Asiata, Jay Tuivaiti (both Samoa) and Vakhtang Jincharadze (Georgia) made their international debuts.
- This was Georgia's largest victory against Samoa, and was the most points they had scored against them, surpassing their previous best of 27–19 in 2018.

==== Tonga v Spain ====
11 July 2026
15:45 MDT (UTC–6)

Tonga	19–32	Spain (1 BP)
Try: Takulua 22' m Lopeti-Moli 63' c Filimone 80' c Con: Pellegrini (2/3) 64', 80'	Report	Try: Bay 25' c Suárez 33' c Piñeiro 56' m Mateu 76' c Con: López-Bontempo (2/2) 26', 34'; Mateu (1/2) 77'; Pen: López-Bontempo (1/1) 9'; Mateu (1/1) 72'

Clarke Stadium, Edmonton (Canada)
Attendance: 5,500 (Note: Combined attendance for Tonga v Spain & Canada v Portugal, which was both hosted at the same venue.)
Referee: Gianluca Gnecchi (Italy)

Tonga	Spain

FB	15	William Havili		(substituted off) 57'
RW	14	Taniela Filimone
OC	13	Fine Inisi
IC	12	Solomone Kata
LW	11	John Tapueluelu	(yellow card) 32'	(substituted off) 72'
FH	10	Patrick Pellegrini
SH	9	Sonatane Takulua (c)		(substituted off) 53'
N8	8	Otunuku Pauta
OF	7	Semisi Paea		(substituted off) 61'
BF	6	Sam Tuitupou
RL	5	Veikoso Poloniati
LL	4	Jimmy Tupou		(substituted off) 61'
TP	3	Atu Moli		(substituted off) 57'
HK	2	Sam Moli		(substituted off) 57'
LP	1	Siegfried Fisiʻihoi		(substituted off) 57'
Substitutions:
HK	16	Sekope Lopeti-Moli		(substituted on) 57'
PR	17	Phil Kite		(substituted on) 57'
PR	18	Paula Latu		(substituted on) 57'
LK	19	Mahonri Ngakuru		(substituted on) 61'
BR	20	Sione Tuipulotu		(substituted on) 61'
SH	21	Siaosi Nginingini		(substituted on) 53'
FH	22	Otumaka Mausia		(substituted on) 57'
CE	23	Sione Tui		(substituted on) 72'
Coach:
Tevita Tuʻifua

FB	15	JW Bell
RW	14	Jaime Manteca
OC	13	Martiniano Cian
IC	12	Álvar Gimeno
LW	11	Alberto Carmona	(substituted off) 72'
FH	10	Gonzalo López-Bontempo	(substituted off) 47'
SH	9	Estanislao Bay	(substituted off) 70'
N8	8	Manex Ariceta	(substituted off) 66'
OF	7	Ignacio Piñeiro
BF	6	Gabriel Vélez	(substituted off) 65'
RL	5	Antonio Suárez
LL	4	Imanol Urraza
TP	3	Hugo Pirlet	(substituted off) 47'
HK	2	Álvaro García (c)	(substituted off) 74'
LP	1	Thierry Futeu	(substituted off) 72'
Substitutions:
HK	16	Santiago Ovejero	(substituted on) 74'
PR	17	Luca Tabarot	(substituted on) 72'
PR	18	Jon Zabala	(substituted on) 47'
BR	19	Matheo Triki	(substituted on) 66'
BR	20	Diego González	(substituted on) 65'
SH	21	Kerman Aurrekoetxea	(substituted on) 70'
CE	22	Iñaki Mateu	(substituted on) 47'
WG	23	Jeremy Trevithick	(substituted on) 72'
Coach:
Pablo Bouza

Assistant referees:
Tomás Bertazza (Argentina)
Mike Lawrenson (United States)
Television match official:
Stefano Penne (Italy)

Notes:

- Sione Tu'i (Tonga), Diego González, Jeremy Trevithick and Gabriel Vélez (all Spain) made their international debuts.
- This was Spain's biggest victory against Tonga, and the most points they had scored in a match against them. It surpassed their previous record of nine-points in their 29–20 victory set in 2024.

==== Chile v Hong Kong ====
11 July 2026
18:00 CLST (UTC–4)

(1 BP) Chile	38–17	Hong Kong
Try: Penalty try 9'; Gurruchaga 15' m Martínez (2) 36' c, 62' c Torrealba 48' c Saab 77' m Con: Videla (3/5) 37', 49', 63'	Report	Try: Post 33' c Combes 38' c Con: Altier (2/2) 34', 40'; Pen: Altier (1/2) 12'

Estadio Sausalito, Vina del Mar
Attendance: 12,872 (Note: Combined attendance for Samoa v Georgia & Chile v Hong Kong, which was both hosted at the same venue.)
Referee: Tomas Ninci (Argentina)

Chile	Hong Kong

FB	15	Iñaki Ayarza	(substituted off) 64'
RW	14	Manuel Bustamante
OC	13	Domingo Saavedra	(substituted off) 72'
IC	12	Santiago Videla
LW	11	Nicolás Saab
FH	10	Matías Garafulic
SH	9	Lucas Berti	(substituted off) 40'
N8	8	Raimundo Martínez	(substituted off) 71'
OF	7	Clemente Saavedra
BF	6	Martín Sigren (c)
RL	5	Javier Eissmann	(substituted off) 71'
LL	4	Santiago Pedrero
TP	3	Iñaki Gurruchaga	(substituted off) 54'
HK	2	Diego Escobar	(substituted off) 76'
LP	1	Javier Carrasco	(substituted off) 55'
Substitutions:
HK	16	Salvador Lues	(substituted on) 76'
PR	17	Emilio Shea	(substituted on) 55'
PR	18	Matías Dittus	(substituted on) 54'
LK	19	Bruno Sáez	(substituted on) 71'
BR	20	Ernesto Tchimino	(substituted on) 71'
SH	21	Marcelo Torrealba	(substituted on) 40'
FH	22	Rodrigo Fernández	(substituted on) 64'
WG	23	Marco Alvano	(substituted on) 72'
Coach:
Pablo Lemoine

FB	15	Paul Altier
RW	14	Marcus Ramage		(substituted off) 27'	(substituted on) 35'
OC	13	Maxwell Threlkeld		(substituted off) 64'
IC	12	Isaac Campbell-Wu		(substituted off) 64'
LW	11	Harry Sayers	(yellow card) 65'
FH	10	Joe Barker
SH	9	Jack Combes		(substituted off) 64'
N8	8	Joshua Hrstich (c)
OF	7	Pierce MacKinlay-West
BF	6	Tyler McNutt		(substituted off) 17'
RL	5	Kyle Sullivan
LL	4	Lachlan Doheny	(yellow card) 9' (red card) 35'
TP	3	Zacceus Cinnamond	(yellow card) 25'			(substituted off) 45'
HK	2	Alexander Post		(substituted off) 64'
LP	1	Rory Cinnamond		(substituted off) 45'
Substitutions:
HK	16	Calum Scott		(substituted on) 64'
PR	17	Sunia Fameitau		(substituted on) 45'
PR	18	Keelan Chapman		(substituted on) 27'	(substituted off) 35'	(substituted on) 45'
LK	19	James Rivers		(substituted on) 17'
BR	20	James Sawyer	(yellow card) 61'	(substituted on) 55'
SH	21	Brendon Nell		(substituted on) 64'
FH	22	Matteo Avitabile		(substituted on) 64'
FB	23	Matt Worley		(substituted on) 64'
Coach:
Logan Asplin

Assistant referees:
Federico Longobardi (Argentina)
Esteban Filipanics (Argentina)
Television match official:
Leo Colgan (Ireland)

Notes:

- Marco Alvano (Chile) and James Rivers (Hong Kong) made their international debuts.

==== United States v Zimbabwe ====
11 July 2026
19:30 EDT (UTC–4)

(1 BP) United States	31–15	Zimbabwe
Try: Mooneyham 5' c Mayo 7' m Den Hoedt 56' m Daniel 77' m Con: Hilsenbeck (1/3) 5'; Pen: Carty (3/3) 63', 73', 80+2'	Report	Try: Sigauke 13' m Burnett 22' c Con: Houston (1/2) 23'; Pen: Houston (1/1) 28'

American Legion Memorial Stadium, Charlotte
Attendance: 3,000
Referee: Damián Schneider (Argentina)

United States	Zimbabwe

FB	15	Mitch Wilson
RW	14	Connor Mooneyham
OC	13	Tavite Lopeti		(substituted off) 73'
IC	12	Dominic Besag
LW	11	Perry Mayo
FH	10	Christopher Hilsenbeck		(substituted off) 62'
SH	9	Ruben de Haas		(substituted off) 74'
N8	8	Makeen Alikhan	(yellow card) 30'	(substituted off) 52'
OF	7	Cory Daniel
BF	6	Lance Williams		(substituted off) 50'
RL	5	Jason Damm (c)
LL	4	Nathan Den Hoedt
TP	3	Tonga Kofe		(substituted off) 58'
HK	2	Alex Maughan		(substituted off) 48'
LP	1	Jack Iscaro		(substituted off) 58'
Substitutions:
HK	16	Shilo Klein		(substituted on) 48'
PR	17	Ezekiel Lindenmuth		(substituted on) 58'
PR	18	Mason Pedersen		(substituted on) 58'
LK	19	Brandon Harvey		(substituted on) 50'
BR	20	Nafi Ma'afu		(substituted on) 52'
SH	21	Ethan McVeigh		(substituted on) 74'
FH	22	Luke Carty		(substituted on) 62'
CE	23	Julian Roberts		(substituted on) 73'
Coach:
Scott Lawrence

FB	15	Tapiwa Mafura
RW	14	Matthew McNab	(substituted off) 64'
OC	13	Dion Khumalo
IC	12	Brandon Mudzekenyedzi
LW	11	Edward Sigauke
FH	10	Ian Prior
SH	9	Keegan Joubert	(substituted off) 46'
N8	8	Aiden Burnett	(substituted off) 52'
OF	7	Jason Fraser	(substituted off) 71'
BF	6	Tinotenda Mavesere (c)
RL	5	Godfrey Muzanargwo
LL	4	Gary Porter
TP	3	Cleopas Kundiona	(substituted off) 62'
HK	2	Liam Larkan	(substituted off) 56'
LP	1	Victor Mupunga	(substituted off) 56'
Substitutions:
HK	16	Matthew Mandioma	(substituted on) 64'
PR	17	Tjide Visser	(substituted on) 56'
PR	18	Michael Kumbirai	(substituted on) 62'
LK	19	Tadiwanashe Gwashu	(substituted on) 71'
BR	20	Simba Siraha	(substituted on) 52'
SH	21	Hilton Mudariki	(substituted on) 56'
FH	22	Bruce Houston		(substituted on) 69'
FB	23	Takudzwa Musingwini	(substituted on) 46'	(substituted off) 69'
Coach:
Pieter Benade

Assistant referees:
Ben Breakspear (Wales)
Robin Kaluzniak (Canada)
Television match official:
Dan Jones (England)

Notes:

- Lance Williams (USA) made his international debut.
- This was the first meeting between the two teams.

==== Canada v Portugal ====
11 July 2026
19:00 MDT (UTC–6)

Canada	14–38	Portugal (1BP)
Try: McMullin 18' c Gallagher 78' c Con: Nelson (2/2) 19', 79'	Report	Try: Marques 29' m Appleton (2) 37' c, 55' c Vasconcelos 42' c Storti (2) 48' m, 52' c Con: Marques (4/6) 37', 43', 53', 56'

Clarke Stadium, Edmonton
Attendance: 5,500 (Note: Combined attendance for Tonga v Spain & Canada v Portugal, which was both hosted at the same venue.)
Referee: Jérémy Rozier (France)

Canada	Portugal

FB	15	Takoda McMullin	(substituted off) 41'
RW	14	Kyle Tremblay
OC	13	Spencer Jones
IC	12	Josh McIndoe	(substituted off) 64'
LW	11	Noah Flesch
FH	10	Peter Nelson
SH	9	Jason Higgins	(substituted off) 46'
N8	8	Sion Parry
OF	7	Evan Olmstead
BF	6	Mason Flesch
RL	5	Izzak Kelly	(substituted off) 57'
LL	4	Piers von Dadelszen	(substituted off) 61'	(substituted on) 76'
TP	3	Cole Keith	(substituted off) 57'
HK	2	Andrew Quattrin (c)	(substituted off) 67'
LP	1	Cali Martinez	(substituted off) 57'
Substitutions:
HK	16	Dewald Kotze	(substituted on) 67'
PR	17	Sam Miller	(substituted on) 57'
PR	18	Kyle Steeves	(substituted on) 57'
LK	19	Daragh Doyle	(substituted on) 61'	(substituted off) 76'
BR	20	Cody Nhanala	(substituted on) 57'
SH	21	Brock Gallagher	(substituted on) 56'
FH	22	Liam James	(substituted on) 41'
CE	23	Jacob Ince	(substituted on) 64'
Coach:
Steve Meehan

FB	15	Vincent Pinto
RW	14	Raffaele Storti
OC	13	Guilherme Vasconcelos
IC	12	Tomás Appleton	(substituted off) 58'
LW	11	Manuel Cardoso Pinto	(substituted off) 58'
FH	10	Hugo Aubry
SH	9	Samuel Marques	(substituted off) 58'
N8	8	José Monteiro
OF	7	João Granate
BF	6	José Madeira (c)
RL	5	Duarte Torgal	(substituted off) 62'
LL	4	Martim Bello
TP	3	Cody Thomas	(substituted off) 55'
HK	2	Luka Begic	(substituted off) 55'
LP	1	Luís Lopes	(substituted off) 55'
Substitutions:
PR	16	Abel da Cunha	(substituted on) 55'
HK	17	Nuno Mascarenhas	(substituted on) 55'
PR	18	António Prim	(substituted on) 55'
LK	19	Guilherme Costa	(substituted on) 62'
BR	20	André da Cunha	(substituted on) 62'
SH	21	Hugo Camacho	(substituted on) 58'
CE	22	Martim Faro	(substituted on) 58'
WG	23	Alfredo Almeida	(substituted on) 58'
Coach:
Simon Mannix

Assistant referees:
Tomás Bertazza (Argentina)
Mike Lawrenson (United States)
Television match official:
Stefano Penne (Italy)

Notes:

- Daragh Doyle, Jacob Ince, Liam James, Cody Nhanala (all Canada) and Alfredo Almeida (Portugal) made their international debuts.
- This was the most points Portugal had scored against Canada, and their largest victory against them by margin. It surpassed their previous meeting in 2025.

=== Round 3 ===
==== Samoa v Romania ====
18 July 2026
11:30 UYT (UTC-3)

(2 BP) Samoa	37–38	Romania (1 BP)
Try: Motuga 14' c Papali'i 40' c Mapu 42' c Faiʻilagi 49' c Con: Alatimu (4/4) 15', 40', 43', 50'; Pen: Alatimu (1/1) 11'; Toala (2/2) 71', 79'	Report	Try: Onutu 22' c Tiqe 34' c Savin (2) 57' m, 80+3' c Simionescu 68' c Boboc 76' m Con: Conache (3/4) 23', 35', 69'; Rupanu (1/2) 80+4'

Estadio Charrúa, Montevideo (Uruguay)
Attendance: 1,000 (Note: Combined attendance for Samoa v Romania & Uruguay v Hong Kong, which was both hosted at the same venue.)
Referee: Angus Mabey (New Zealand)

Samoa	Romania

FB	15	Latrell Smiler-Ah Kiong
RW	14	Tuna Tuitama
OC	13	Duncan Paia'aua
IC	12	Peter Umaga-Jensen
LW	11	Warren Solomona
FH	10	AJ Alatimu		(substituted off) 59'
SH	9	Joel Lam		(substituted off) 59'
N8	8	Abraham Papali'i		(substituted off) 40'
OF	7	Alamanda Motuga		(substituted off) 51'
BF	6	Miracle Faiʻilagi (c)
RL	5	Sam Slade		(substituted off) 69'
LL	4	Ben Nee-Nee
TP	3	Marco Fepulea'i		(substituted off) 55'
HK	2	Richie Asiata		(substituted off) 55'
LP	1	Aki Seiuli		(substituted off) 55'
Substitutions:
HK	16	Manaaki Boyle-Tiatia		(substituted on) 55'
PR	17	Jarred Adams		(substituted on) 55'
PR	18	Lolani Faleiva	(yellow card) 77'	(substituted on) 55'
LK	19	Jay Tuivaiti		(substituted on) 69'
BR	20	Niko Jones		(substituted on) 51'
BR	21	Iakopo Mapu		(substituted on) 40'
SH	22	Ere Enari		(substituted on) 59'
CE	23	Danny Toala		(substituted on) 59'
Coach:
Tusi Pisi

FB	15	Marius Simionescu
RW	14	Tevita Manumua
OC	13	Nicholas Onutu
IC	12	Jason Tomane	(substituted off) 78'
LW	11	Iliesa Tiqe	(substituted off) 61'
FH	10	Hinckley Vaovasa
SH	9	Alin Conache	(substituted off) 73'
N8	8	Etienne Terblanche	(substituted off) 64'
OF	7	Cristi Boboc (c)
BF	6	Keanan Murray	(substituted off) 51'
RL	5	Logan Weidner
LL	4	Nicolaas Immelman
TP	3	Cosmin Manole	(substituted off) 51'
HK	2	Ștefan Buruiană	(substituted off) 51'
LP	1	Iulian Hartig	(substituted off) 51'
Substitutions:
HK	16	Tudor Butnariu	(substituted on) 51'
PR	17	Alexandru Savin	(substituted on) 51'
PR	18	Jean-Pierre Smith	(substituted on) 51'
LK	19	Andrei Mahu	(substituted on) 51'
BR	20	Iacopo Bianchi	(substituted on) 64'
SH	21	Gabriel Rupanu	(substituted on) 73'
CE	22	Mihai Graure	(substituted on) 61'
CE	23	Alexandru Bucur	(substituted on) 78'
Coach:
David Gérard

Assistant referees:
Tomas Ninci (Argentina)
Caua Ricardo (Brazil)
Television match official:
Julien Caistaignede (France)

Notes:

- Etienne Terblanche (Romania) made his international debut.

==== Uruguay v Hong Kong ====
18 July 2026
14:00 UYT (UTC-3)

(2 BP) Uruguay	40–42	Hong Kong (1 BP)
Try: Myszka (3) 6' m, 25' c, 29' c Diana 31' c Alonso 43' c Capdevila 78' c Con: Cotarmanac'h (5/6) 26', 30', 32', 43', 79'	Report	Try: Post 21' c Worley 46' c Ramage 59' c Penalty try 66'; Nell 68' m Con: Altier (3/4) 22', 47', 60'; Pen: Altier (3/3) 15', 24', 80+1'

Estadio Charrúa, Montevideo
Attendance: 1,000 (Note: Combined attendance for Samoa v Romania & Uruguay v Hong Kong, which was both hosted at the same venue.)
Referee: Craig Evans (Wales)

Uruguay	Hong Kong

FB	15	Francisco Gonzalez Capdevila
RW	14	Juan Gonzalez		(substituted off) 47'
OC	13	Felipe Arcos Perez
IC	12	Juan Manuel Alonso
LW	11	Franco Scaldaferri		(substituted off) 74'	(substituted on) 76'
FH	10	Jean Cotarmanac'h
SH	9	Joaquin Suarez
N8	8	Manuel Diana
OF	7	Lucas Bianchi
BF	6	Manuel Ardao
RL	5	Felipe Aliaga (c)
LL	4	Ignacio Dotti		(substituted off) 61'
TP	3	Reinaldo Piussi		(substituted off) 66'
HK	2	Joaquin Myszka	(yellow card) 66'
LP	1	Mateo Sanguinetti
Substitutions:
HK	16	Máximo Lamelas		(substituted on) 74'	(substituted off) 76'
PR	17	Mateo Perillo		(substituted on) 66'
PR	18	Santiago Cagnone
LK	19	Manuel Rosmarino		(substituted on) 61'
BR	20	Mateo Sosa
SH	21	Ignacio Rodríguez Bosch
FB	22	Francisco Landauer
CE	23	Alfonso Vidal	(yellow card) 80'	(substituted on) 47'
Coach:
Rodolfo Ambrosio

FB	15	Matt Worley		(substituted off) 57'
RW	14	Paul Altier
OC	13	Marcus Ramage
IC	12	Thomas Hill		(substituted off) 66'
LW	11	Sebastian Brien
FH	10	Matteo Avitabile
SH	9	Jack Combes		(substituted off) 57'
N8	8	Joshua Hrstich (c)		(substituted off) 80'
OF	7	Pierce MacKinlay-West
BF	6	Lachlan Doheny	(yellow card) 27'
RL	5	Kyle Sullivan		(substituted off) 47'
LL	4	James Rivers
TP	3	Keelan Chapman		(substituted off) 63'
HK	2	Alexander Post
LP	1	Rory Cinnamond		(substituted off) 47'
Substitutions:
HK	16	Ng Siu Lung
PR	17	Sunia Fameitau		(substituted on) 47'
PR	18	Zacceus Cinnamond		(substituted on) 63'
LK	19	Max Murphy		(substituted on) 47'
BR	20	Dana Fourie		(substituted on) 80'
SH	21	Brendon Nell		(substituted on) 57'
CE	22	Isaac Campbell-Wu		(substituted on) 66'
CE	23	Maxwell Threlkeld	(yellow card) 70'	(substituted on) 57'
Coach:
Logan Asplin

Assistant referees:
Tomas Ninci (Argentina)
Caua Ricardo (Brazil)
Television match official:
Dan Jones (England)

Notes:

- Máximo Lamelas and Franco Scaldaferri (both Uruguay) made their international debuts.
- This was the first time Hong Kong has beaten Uruguay in a test match.
- This was the first time Hong Kong has beaten a team higher ranked than them in the World Rugby Rankings since its formal introduction in 2003.

==== Chile v Georgia ====
18 July 2026
13:00 CLST (UTC-4)

Chile	22–49	Georgia (1 BP)
Try: Bustamante 25' m Videla 39' m Dittus 80+5' c Con: Garafulic (2/3) 40', 80+6'; Pen: Garafulic (1/1) 9'	Report	Try: Tchumbadze 4' c Jincharadze (2) 12' c, 79' c Ivanishvili 18' c Shvangiradze 35' c Kakhoidze 59' c Iashagashvili 67' c Con: Matkava (7/7) 5', 13', 18', 36', 60', 69', 80'

CARR Mahuida, La Reina (Note: The match was originally set to take place at Estadio La Portada, La Serena, but was relocated to CARR Mahuida due to concerns over adverse weather.)
Attendance: 0 (Note: The match was played behind closed doors due to safety concerns associated with the adverse weather conditions forecast.)
Referee: Jordan Way (Australia)

Chile	Georgia

FB	15	Matías Garafulic
RW	14	Manuel Bustamante
OC	13	Domingo Saavedra
IC	12	Santiago Videla	(yellow card) 18'
LW	11	Nicolás Saab
FH	10	Rodrigo Fernández		(substituted off) 49'
SH	9	Marcelo Torrealba		(substituted off) 55'
N8	8	Alfonso Escobar		(substituted off) 33'
OF	7	Raimundo Martínez		(substituted off) 69'
BF	6	Martín Sigren (c)
RL	5	Javier Eissmann	(yellow card) 3'	(substituted off) 71'
LL	4	Santiago Pedrero
TP	3	Iñaki Gurruchaga		(substituted off) 60'
HK	2	Diego Escobar		(substituted off) 73'
LP	1	Javier Carrasco		(substituted off) 49'
Substitutions:
HK	16	Salvador Lues		(substituted on) 73'
PR	17	Emilio Shea		(substituted on) 49'
PR	18	Matías Dittus		(substituted on) 60'
LK	19	Bruno Sáez		(substituted on) 71'
BR	20	Clemente Saavedra		(substituted on) 33'
SH	21	Juan Sebastián Bianchi		(substituted on) 55'
FB	22	Iñaki Ayarza		(substituted on) 49'
BR	23	Ernesto Tchimino		(substituted on) 69'
Coach:
Pablo Lemoine

FB	15	Davit Niniashvili (c)		(substituted off) 3'
RW	14	Akaki Tabutsadze
OC	13	Giorgi Shvelidze
IC	12	Tornike Kakhoidze	(yellow card) 32'
LW	11	Giorgi Kveseladze
FH	10	Luka Matkava
SH	9	Vasil Lobzhanidze		(substituted off) 71'
N8	8	Tornike Jalagonia		(substituted off) 65'
OF	7	Luka Ivanishvili
BF	6	Beka Shvangiradze		(substituted off) 60'
RL	5	Giorgi Javakhia		(substituted off) 50'
LL	4	Mikheil Babunashvili
TP	3	Bachuki Tchumbadze		(substituted off) 60'
HK	2	Nikoloz Sutidze		(substituted off) 7'
LP	1	Giorgi Akhaladze		(substituted off) 50'
Substitutions:
HK	16	Vakhtang Jincharadze		(substituted on) 7'
PR	17	Nika Abuladze		(substituted on) 50'
PR	18	Giorgi Pertaia		(substituted on) 60'
LK	19	Kote Mikautadze		(substituted on) 50'
BR	20	Ilia Spanderashvili		(substituted on) 60'
BR	21	Ioane Iashaghashvili		(substituted on) 65'
SH	22	Mikheil Alania		(substituted on) 71'
FH	23	Tedo Abzhandadze		(substituted on) 3'
Coach:
Pierre-Henry Broncan

Assistant referees:
Federico Longobardi (Argentina)
Juan Manuel Martínez (Argentina)
Television match official:
Julien Caistaignede (France)

Notes:

- Giorgi Pertaia (Georgia) made his international debut.
- This was the first time Georgia has beaten Chile.

==== Tonga v Portugal ====
18 July 2026
15:45 CDT (UTC-5)

(2 BP) Tonga	28–32	Portugal (1 BP)
Try: Pauta 17' m Filimone 25' m Veainu 48' c Kata 64' m Con: Pellegrini (1/4) 49'; Pen: Pellegrini (2/3) 6', 13'	Report	Try: Storti (2) 21' c, 44' m M. Pinto 30' m Mascarenhas 35' c da Cunha 62' m Con: Marques (2/5) 22', 36'; Pen: Marques (1/1) 53'

Princess Auto Stadium, Winnipeg (Canada)
Attendance: 6,700 (Note: Combined attendance for Tonga v Portugal & Canada v Zimbabwe, which was both hosted at the same venue.)
Referee: Damián Schneider (Argentina)

Tonga	Portugal

FB	15	Telusa Veainu	(yellow card) 67'
RW	14	Taniela Filimone
OC	13	Fine Inisi		(substituted off) 66'
IC	12	Solomone Kata (c)
LW	11	John Tapueluelu
FH	10	Patrick Pellegrini
SH	9	Siaosi Nginingini		(substituted off) 54'
N8	8	Sione Tuipulotu		(substituted off) 63'		(substituted on) 80+2'
OF	7	Sam Tuitupou
BF	6	Otunuku Pauta		(substituted off) 37'	(substituted on) 46'	(substituted off) 80+2'
RL	5	Veikoso Poloniati	(yellow card) 34'	(substituted off) 70'
LL	4	Jimmy Tupou
TP	3	Paula Latu		(substituted off) 55'
HK	2	Sam Moli	(yellow card) 35'			(substituted off) 70'
LP	1	Siegfried Fisiʻihoi		(substituted off) 55'
Substitutions:
HK	16	Sekope Lopeti-Moli		(substituted on) 37'	(substituted off) 46'	(substituted on) 70'
PR	17	Fatongia Paea		(substituted on) 55'
PR	18	Atu Moli		(substituted on) 55'
LK	19	Mahonri Ngakuru		(substituted on) 70'
BR	20	Sione Misiloi		(substituted on) 63'
SH	21	Sonatane Takulua		(substituted on) 54'
FH	22	Otumaka Mausia
WG	23	Anzelo Tuitavuki		(substituted on) 66'
Coach:
Tevita Tuʻifua

FB	15	Vincent Pinto
RW	14	Raffaele Storti
OC	13	Guilherme Vasconcelos
IC	12	Tomás Appleton
LW	11	Manuel Cardoso Pinto
FH	10	Domingos Cabral		(substituted off) 75'
SH	9	Samuel Marques
N8	8	José Monteiro
OF	7	João Granate		(substituted off) 51'
BF	6	José Madeira (c)	(yellow card) 55'
RL	5	Duarte Torgal		(substituted off) 63'
LL	4	Martim Bello
TP	3	António Prim		(substituted off) 55'
HK	2	Luka Begic		(substituted off) 22'
LP	1	Cody Thomas		(substituted off) 55'
Substitutions:
PR	16	Luís Lopes		(substituted on) 55'
HK	17	Nuno Mascarenhas	(yellow card) 80+4'	(substituted on) 22'
PR	18	Abel da Cunha		(substituted on) 55'
LK	19	Guilherme Costa		(substituted on) 63'
BR	20	André da Cunha		(substituted on) 51'
SH	21	Hugo Camacho
CE	22	Hugo Aubry		(substituted on) 75'
WG	23	Tomás Batista
Coach:
Simon Mannix

Assistant referees:
Gianluca Gnecchi (Italy)
Mike Lawrenson (United States)
Television match official:
Francisco Gonzalez (Uruguay)

Notes:

- Sione Misiloi (Tonga) made his international debut.

==== United States v Spain ====
18 July 2026
19:30 EDT (UTC-4)

(1 BP) United States	29–22	Spain (1 BP)
Try: Wilson 11' c Ryan 18' c Roberts 38' m Mayo 66' c Con: Hilsenbeck (2/3) 12', 19'; Carty (1/1) 66'; Pen: Carty (1/2) 73'	Report	Try: Bay 13' c Manteca 32' m Cian 48' c Con: López-Bontempo (2/3) 14', 49'; Pen: López-Bontempo (1/2) 60'

WakeMed Soccer Park, Cary
Attendance: 7,900
Referee: Ben Breakspear (Wales)

United States	Spain

FB	15	Mitch Wilson
RW	14	Mark O'Keeffe
OC	13	Julian Roberts		(substituted off) 61'
IC	12	Dominic Besag
LW	11	Perry Mayo	(yellow card) 28'
FH	10	Christopher Hilsenbeck		(substituted off) 60'
SH	9	Ruben de Haas		(substituted off) 80'
N8	8	Jason Damm (c)
OF	7	Paddy Ryan
BF	6	Cory Daniel		(substituted off) 31'
RL	5	Brandon Harvey		(substituted off) 51'
LL	4	Nathan Den Hoedt
TP	3	Tonga Kofe		(substituted off) 45'
HK	2	Kapeli Pifeleti		(substituted off) 55'
LP	1	Jack Iscaro		(substituted off) 55'
Substitutions:
HK	16	Shilo Klein		(substituted on) 55'
PR	17	Ezekiel Lindenmuth		(substituted on) 55'
PR	18	Charlie Abel		(substituted on) 45'
BR	19	Nafi Ma'afu		(substituted on) 51'
BR	20	Benjamín Bonasso		(substituted on) 31'
SH	21	Ethan McVeigh		(substituted on) 80'
FH	22	Luke Carty		(substituted on) 60'
CE	23	Tavite Lopeti		(substituted on) 61'
Coach:
Scott Lawrence

FB	15	JW Bell
RW	14	Gauthier Minguillon	(substituted off) 15'
OC	13	Martiniano Cian	(substituted off) 68'	(substituted on) 71'
IC	12	Álvar Gimeno		(substituted off) 71'
LW	11	Alberto Carmona	(substituted off) 58'
FH	10	Gonzalo López-Bontempo
SH	9	Estanislao Bay
N8	8	Ekain Imaz	(substituted off) 55'
OF	7	Ignacio Piñeiro
BF	6	Gabriel Vélez	(substituted off) 66'
RL	5	Antonio Suárez
LL	4	Manex Ariceta
TP	3	Hugo Pirlet	(substituted off) 43'
HK	2	Álvaro García (c)	(substituted off) 68'
LP	1	Luca Tabaro	(substituted off) 43'
Substitutions:
HK	16	Santiago Ovejero	(substituted on) 68'
PR	17	Thierry Futeu	(substituted on) 43'
PR	18	Jon Zabala	(substituted on) 43'
BR	19	Vicente Boronat	(substituted on) 55'
BR	20	Diego González	(substituted on) 66'
SH	21	Kerman Aurrekoetxea	(substituted on) 68'
CE	22	Iñaki Mateu	(substituted on) 58'
FB	23	Jaime Manteca	(substituted on) 15'
Coach:
Pablo Bouza

Assistant referees:
Jérémy Rozier (France)
Robin Kaluzniak (Canada)
Television match official:
Dan Jones (England)

Notes:

- Charlie Abel (USA) made his international debut.

==== Canada v Zimbabwe ====
18 July 2026
19:00 CDT (UTC-5)

Canada	23–19	Zimbabwe (1 BP)
Try: Flesch 40+1' c Martinez 58' c Con: Nelson (2/2) 40+2', 58'; Pen: Nelson (3/4) 28', 33', 53'	Report	Try: Larkan 56'′ c Kundiona 70' c Khumalo 80' m Con: Prior (2/3) 57', 71'

Princess Auto Stadium, Winnipeg
Attendance: 6,700 (Note: Combined attendance for Tonga v Portugal & Canada v Zimbabwe, which was both hosted at the same venue.)
Referee: Tomás Bertazza (Argentina)

Canada	Zimbabwe

FB	15	Peter Nelson
RW	14	Kyle Tremblay
OC	13	Spencer Jones
IC	12	Josh McIndoe
LW	11	Noah Flesch	(substituted off) 76'
FH	10	Cooper Coats
SH	9	Jason Higgins	(substituted off) 68'
N8	8	Lucas Rumball	(substituted off) 59'
OF	7	Sion Parry
BF	6	Mason Flesch
RL	5	Izzak Kelly	(substituted off) 76'
LL	4	Evan Olmstead
TP	3	Cole Keith	(substituted off) 47'
HK	2	Andrew Quattrin (c)
LP	1	Cali Martinez	(substituted off) 66'
Substitutions:
HK	16	Foster DeWitt
PR	17	Sam Miller	(substituted on) 66'
PR	18	Kyle Steeves	(substituted on) 47'
LK	19	Daragh Doyle	(substituted on) 76'
BR	20	Cody Nhanala	(substituted on) 59'
SH	21	Stephen Webb	(substituted on) 68'
CE	22	Lockie Kratz
FH	23	Liam James	(substituted on) 76'
Coach:
Steve Meehan

FB	15	Tapiwa Mafura	(substituted off) 20'
RW	14	Matthew McNab	(substituted off) 40'
OC	13	Brandon Mudzekenyedzi
IC	12	Kudzai Mashawi
LW	11	Edward Sigauke
FH	10	Bruce Houston
SH	9	Tyrone Gombe	(substituted off) 78'
N8	8	Aiden Burnett	(substituted off) 46'
OF	7	Tadiwanashe Gwashu
BF	6	Tinotenda Mavesere (c)
RL	5	Godfrey Muzanargwo
LL	4	Gary Porter	(substituted off) 66'
TP	3	Farai Mudariki	(substituted off) 40'
HK	2	Bryan Chiang	(substituted off) 40'	(substituted on) 75'
LP	1	Tjide Visser	(substituted off) 40'
Substitutions:
CE	16	Dion Khumalo	(substituted on) 20'
PR	17	Victor Mupunga	(substituted on) 40'
PR	18	Cleopas Kundiona	(substituted on) 40'
BR	19	Jason Fraser	(substituted on) 46'
BR	20	Simba Siraha	(substituted on) 66'
HK	21	Liam Larkan	(substituted on) 40'	(substituted off) 75'
SH	22	Keegan Joubert	(substituted on) 78'
FH	23	Ian Prior	(substituted on) 40'
Coach:
Pieter Benade

Assistant referees:
Gianluca Gnecchi (Italy)
Mike Lawrenson (United States)
Television match official:
Aled Griffiths (Wales)

Notes:

- This was the first meeting between the two teams.

== See also ==
- 2026 World Rugby Nations Cup
- 2026 Nations Championship Southern Hemisphere Series
- 2026 men's rugby union internationals
