= 2026 World Rugby Nations Cup =

Upcoming international rugby union competition

- Number of teams: 12
- Date: 4 July – 21 November 2026
- Champions: United States (Americas-Pacific pool); Georgia (European-African-Asian pool)
- Matches played: 35
- Attendance: 130,217 (average 3,720 per match)
- Tries scored: 251 (average 7.2 per match)
- Top point scorer: (Georgia (country)) Luka Matkava (76)
- Top try scorer: (Uruguay) Joaquín Myszka (7)

Official website
- www.world.rugby/nations-cup/en

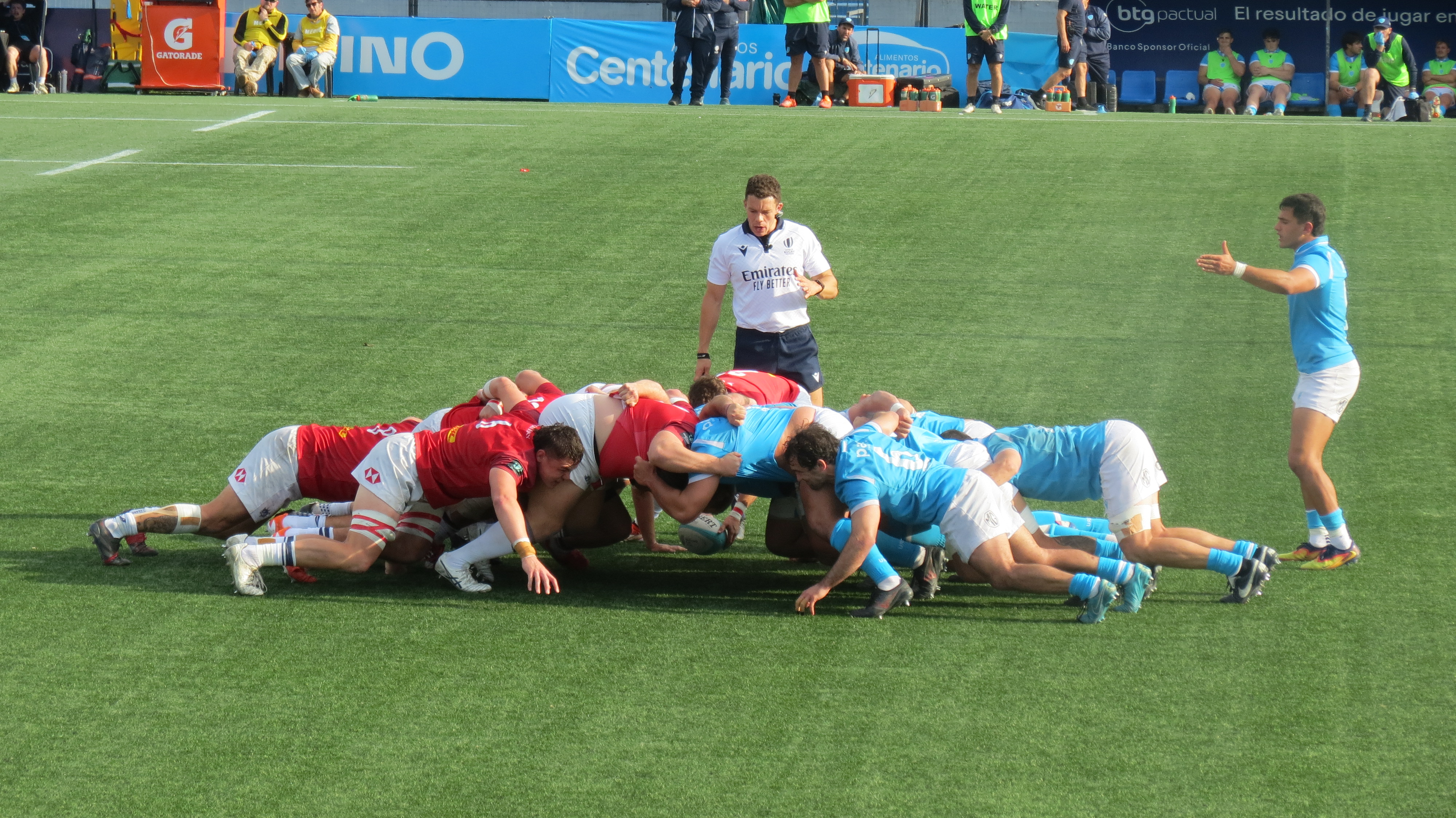
Uruguay vs Hong Kong

The 2026 World Rugby Nations Cup is the inaugural edition of the World Rugby Nations Cup, a second tier rugby union competition for international men's teams, run by World Rugby, that will take place concurrently with the 2026 Nations Championship. It is due to consist of twelve teams.

Although promotion and relegation are intended for a future date, there will be no promotion or relegation in the 2026 edition between the Nations Championship and the Nations Cup.

== Background ==
In December 2024 it was reported that the second division would initially consist of the 12 teams that successfully qualify for the 2027 Men's Rugby World Cup through the qualification process, meaning all the qualified teams for the 2027 tournament will take part in the inaugural edition of either the Nations Championship itself or the second division.

On 17 November 2025, World Rugby confirmed that the second division competition would be called the World Rugby Nations Cup.

At the same time, it was announced that in Rugby World Cup and British & Irish Lions years, when the Nations Championship and Nations Cup are not played, 'cross competition matches' between the Nations Championship teams and the Nations Cup teams will be prioritised.

== Participants ==
Teams that will compete in the 2026 Nations Cup are:

Team	Stadium			Head coach	Captain	World Rugby Ranking	
Team	Home stadium	Capacity	Location	Head coach	Captain	Start (Note: As of 4 July 2026)	End (Note: As of 21 November 2026)
Canada	Clarke Stadium	6,000	Edmonton	Steve Meehan	Andrew Quattrin (Note: For 2026 World Rugby Nations Cup Americas-Pacific Series); Lucas Rumball (Note: For 2026 World Rugby Nations Cup European-African-Asian Series); Ben LeSage (Note: For Hong Kong v Canada)	25	21
Canada	Princess Auto Stadium	32,343	Winnipeg	Steve Meehan	Andrew Quattrin; Lucas Rumball; Ben LeSage	25	21
Chile	Estadio Nacional Julio Martínez Prádanos	48,745	Santiago	Pablo Lemoine	Martín Sigren (Note: For 2026 World Rugby Nations Cup Americas-Pacific Series); Santiago Videla (Note: For 2026 World Rugby Nations Cup European-African-Asian Series)	18	17
Chile	Estadio Sausalito	23,423	Viña del Mar	Pablo Lemoine	Martín Sigren; Santiago Videla	18	17
Chile	CARR Mahuida (Note: The match was originally set to take place at Estadio La Portada, La Serena, but was relocated to CARR Mahuida due to concerns over adverse weather.)	2,900	La Reina	Pablo Lemoine	Martín Sigren; Santiago Videla	18	17
Georgia	Avchala Stadium	3,500	Tbilisi	Pierre-Henry Broncan	Davit Niniashvili	13	13
Georgia	Mikheil Meskhi Stadium	27,223	Tbilisi	Pierre-Henry Broncan	Davit Niniashvili	13	13
Hong Kong	Kai Tak Youth Sports Ground	5,000	Hong Kong	Andrew Douglas (for Logan Asplin) (Note: Asplin was head coach during the Americas-Pacific series, but he was let go after the series and Andrew Douglas replaced him.)	Joshua Hrstich; Pierce MacKinlay-West (Note: For Samoa v Hong Kong)	23	24
Hong Kong	Stade Marcel-Verchère	11,400	Bourg-en-Bresse	Andrew Douglas (for Logan Asplin)	Joshua Hrstich; Pierce MacKinlay-West	23	24
Hong Kong	Chambéry Savoie Stadium	5,285	Chambery	Andrew Douglas (for Logan Asplin)	Joshua Hrstich; Pierce MacKinlay-West	23	24
Portugal	Estádio do Restelo	19,856	Lisbon	Simon Mannix	José Madeira	14	15
Romania	Stadionul National Arcul de Triumf	8,207	Bucharest	David Gérard	Cristi Boboc	22	23
Samoa	No home games			Tusi Pisi	Miracle Faiʻilagi (Note: For 2026 World Rugby Nations Cup Americas-Pacific Series); Theo McFarland (Note: For 2026 World Rugby Nations Cup European-African-Asian Series)	20	14
Spain	Estadio Nacional Complutense	6,000	Madrid	Pablo Bouza	Álvaro García; Jon Zabala (Note: For Canada v Spain & Spain v Uruguay)	17	20
Spain	Butarque Stadium	14,500	Leganés	Pablo Bouza	Álvaro García; Jon Zabala	17	20
Spain	Estadio Ciudad de Málaga	10,816	Málaga	Pablo Bouza	Álvaro García; Jon Zabala	17	20
Tonga	No home games			Tevita Tuʻifua	Sonatane Takulua (Note: For 2026 World Rugby Nations Cup Americas-Pacific Series); Solomone Kata (Note: For Tonga v Portugal); Fetuli Paea (Note: For Romania v Tonga); Ben Tameifuna (Note: For 2026 World Rugby Nations Cup European-African-Asian Series)	19	18
United States	Dick's Sporting Goods Park	18,061	Commerce City	Scott Lawrence	Jason Damm	16	16
United States	American Legion Memorial Stadium	10,500	Charlotte	Scott Lawrence	Jason Damm	16	16
United States	WakeMed Soccer Park	10,000	Cary	Scott Lawrence	Jason Damm	16	16
Uruguay	Estadio Charrua	14,000	Montevideo	Guzmán Barreiro (for Rodolfo Ambrosio) (Note: Rodolfo Ambrosio was head coach during the Americas-Pacific series, but he was let go after the series and Guzmán Barreiro replaced him.)	Felipe Aliaga (Note: For 2026 World Rugby Nations Cup Americas-Pacific Series); Manuel Leindekar (Note: For 2026 World Rugby Nations Cup European-African-Asian Series)	15	19
Zimbabwe	DIY Kitchens Stadium	9,252	Wakefield	Pieter Benade	Tinotenda Mavesere (co-captain); Hilton Mudariki (co-captain)	24	25
Zimbabwe	Trailfinders Sports Ground	5,388	Ealing	Pieter Benade	Tinotenda Mavesere (co-captain); Hilton Mudariki (co-captain)	24	25
Zimbabwe	Stade Chanzy	8,000	Angouleme	Pieter Benade	Tinotenda Mavesere (co-captain); Hilton Mudariki (co-captain)	24	25

== Format ==
As with the 2026 Nations Championship the initial competition will consist of two broadly geographic pools:

- an America-Pacific pool, consisting of the four American teams plus Tonga and Samoa; and
- a European-African-Asian pool, consisting of the four European sides, Zimbabwe and Hong Kong.

Each team will play all the teams in the opposite pool across the summer and autumn international windows.

For the first two editions in 2026 and 2028, there will not be a finals day, and two champions will be crowned, one in each pool.

In addition, Samoa, Tonga, Zimbabwe and Hong Kong will play their home matches in neutral venues; in the case of Samoa and Tonga, in South and North America respectively and in the case of Hong Kong and Zimbabwe, in Continental Europe and England respectively. However Hong Kong's final match, against Tonga, will be played in Hong Kong as it is a convenient venue for Tonga in their journey back to the islands. The Americas series will take place in the northern hemisphere summer, and the European series in the northern hemisphere autumn.

== Standings ==
=== Americas-Pacific pool ===
Pos	Team	Pld	W	D	L	PF	PA	PD	TF	TA	TB	LB	Pts
1	United States (C)	6	5	0	1	181	154	+27	23	21	4	0	24
2	Samoa	6	4	0	2	284	124	+160	42	17	5	1	22
3	Chile	6	4	0	2	182	182	0	23	24	3	0	19
4	Tonga	6	3	0	3	212	202	+10	31	30	5	1	18
5	Canada	6	3	1	2	158	201	−43	22	30	3	0	17
6	Uruguay	6	1	2	3	142	152	−10	21	19	3	3	14

Updated to match(es) played on 21 November 2026. Source: Nations Cup
(C) Champion

=== European-African-Asian pool ===
Pos	Team	Pld	W	D	L	PF	PA	PD	TF	TA	TB	LB	Pts
1	Georgia (C)	6	6	0	0	275	123	+152	38	18	5	0	29
2	Portugal	6	3	1	2	140	123	+17	21	17	4	1	19
3	Romania	6	1	1	4	183	234	−51	29	33	6	2	14
4	Spain	6	2	1	3	157	217	−60	20	29	2	2	14
5	Hong Kong	6	1	0	5	140	265	−125	17	40	1	1	6
6	Zimbabwe	6	0	0	6	111	187	−76	16	25	2	3	5

Updated to match(es) played on 21 November 2026 (after Hong Kong China vs Tonga). Source: Nations Cup
(C) Champion

== Fixtures ==
=== Americas-Pacific Series ===
Matches will be held in the Americas region, with Samoa playing their matches in South America and Tonga playing their matches in North America. Each of the European visiting teams will play all their matches in either North America or all in South America to reduce travel. Fixtures and venues were announced by World Rugby on 31 March 2026.

==== Round 1 ====
4 July 2026	Uruguay	34–41	Georgia	Estadio Charrua, Montevideo
4 July 2026	Samoa	66–19	Hong Kong	Estadio Nacional Julio Martinez Pradanos, Santiago (Chile)
4 July 2026	Chile	48–31	Romania	Estadio Nacional Julio Martinez Pradanos, Santiago
4 July 2026	Tonga	36–26	Zimbabwe	Dick's Sporting Goods Park, Commerce City (United States)
4 July 2026	United States	30–29	Portugal	Dick's Sporting Goods Park, Commerce City
4 July 2026	Canada	42–42	Spain	Clarke Stadium, Edmonton

==== Round 2 ====
11 July 2026	Uruguay	36–36	Romania	Estadio Charrua, Montevideo
11 July 2026	Samoa	12–33	Georgia	Estadio Sausalito, Vina del Mar (Chile)
11 July 2026	Tonga	19–32	Spain	Clarke Stadium, Edmonton (Canada)
11 July 2026	Chile	38–17	Hong Kong	Estadio Sausalito, Vina del Mar
11 July 2026	United States	31–15	Zimbabwe	American Legion Memorial Stadium, Charlotte
11 July 2026	Canada	14–38	Portugal	Clarke Stadium, Edmonton

==== Round 3 ====
18 July 2026	Samoa	37–38	Romania	Estadio Charrua, Montevideo (Uruguay)
18 July 2026	Uruguay	40–42	Hong Kong	Estadio Charrua, Montevideo
18 July 2026	Tonga	28–32	Portugal	Princess Auto Stadium, Winnipeg (Canada)
18 July 2026	Chile	22–49	Georgia	CARR Mahuida, La Reina
18 July 2026	United States	29–22	Spain	WakeMed Soccer Park, Cary
18 July 2026	Canada	23–19	Zimbabwe	Princess Auto Stadium, Winnipeg

=== European-African-Asian Series ===
European teams will host all of their matches at home. Zimbabwe will host two of their games in England and one in France. Hong Kong will play their first two matches in France, with the third, against Tonga, being held in Hong Kong. Confirmation of venues for the second half of fixtures came on 31 August.

==== Round 4 ====
6 November 2026	Romania	38–43	Tonga	Stadionul National Arcul de Triumf, Bucharest
7 November 2026	Georgia	59–14	Canada	Avchala Stadium, Tbilisi
7 November 2026	Portugal	36–15	Chile	Estádio do Restelo, Lisbon
7 November 2026	Spain	18–12	Uruguay	Estadio Nacional Complutense, Madrid
7 November 2026	Zimbabwe	7–43	Samoa	Belle Vue, Wakefield (England)
8 November 2026	Hong Kong	26–28	United States	Stade Marcel-Verchère, Bourg-en-Bresse (France)

==== Round 5 ====
14 November 2026	Georgia	55–31	Tonga	Avchala Stadium, Tbilisi
14 November 2026	Hong Kong	17–38	Canada	Chambéry Savoie Stadium, Chambery (France)
14 November 2026	Portugal	5–36	Samoa	Estádio do Restelo, Lisbon
14 November 2026	Zimbabwe	15–20	Uruguay	Trailfinders Sports Ground, London (England)
14 November 2026	Spain	20–25	Chile	Butarque Stadium, Leganés
14 November 2026	Romania	24–53	United States	Stadionul National Arcul de Triumf, Bucharest

==== Round 6 ====
20 November 2026	Romania	26–27	Canada	Stadionul National Arcul de Triumf, Bucharest
21 November 2026	Hong Kong	19–55	Tonga	Kai Tak Youth Sports Ground, Hong Kong
21 November 2026	Georgia	38–10	United States	Mikheil Meskhi Stadium, Tbilisi
21 November 2026	Portugal	0–0 (Note: The match between Portugal and Uruguay was cancelled shortly before kick-off after a pitch inspection found the pitch waterlogged, and further rain was forecast. The match was recorded as a 0-0 draw)	Uruguay	Estádio do Restelo, Lisbon
21 November 2026	Spain	22–90	Samoa	Estadio Ciudad de Málaga, Málaga
21 November 2026	Zimbabwe	29–34	Chile	Stade Chanzy, Angoulême (France)

== Player statistics ==
=== Most points ===
Pos.	Name	Team	Pts.
1	Luka Matkava	Georgia	76
2	Matías Garafulic	Chile	51
3	Christopher Hilsenbeck	United States	40
3	Patrick Pellegrini	Tonga	40
5	Paul Altier	Hong Kong	36
5	Samuel Marques	Portugal	36
7	Joaquín Myszka	Uruguay	35
8	Manuel Cardoso Pinto	Portugal	30
8	Raffaele Storti	Portugal	30
10	AJ Alatimu	Samoa	29

=== Most tries ===
Pos.	Name	Team	Tries
1	Joaquín Myszka	Uruguay	7
2	Manuel Cardoso Pinto	Portugal	6
2	Raffaele Storti	Portugal	6
4	Raimundo Martínez	Chile	5
5	Estanislao Bay	Spain	4
5	Miracle Faiʻilagi	Samoa	4
5	Perry Mayo	United States	4
5	Latrell Smiler-Ah Kiong	Samoa	4
5	Aka Tabutsadze	Georgia	4
10	6 Players with 3 tries		

== Discipline ==
=== Summary ===
As of 21 November 2026

Team	Yellow card	Red card	Total
Hong Kong	9	1	10
Tonga	8	0	8
Chile	8	0	8
Georgia	7	0	7
Spain	5	1	6
Portugal	3	2	5
Romania	5	0	5
Samoa	5	0	5
United States	5	0	5
Canada	4	0	4
Uruguay	4	0	4
Zimbabwe	2	0	2

=== Red cards ===
- (Hong Kong) Lachlan Doheny (vs. Chile)
- (Portugal) Manuel Vareiro (vs. United States)
- (Portugal) Pedro Vicente (vs. United States)
- (Spain) Gauthier Minguillon (vs. Samoa)

=== Yellow cards ===
- (Canada) Nic Benn (vs. Georgia)
- (Canada) Lucas Rumball (vs. Georgia)
- (Canada) Isaac Olson (vs. Hong Kong)
- (Canada) Matthew Oworu (vs. Romania)
- (Chile) Davit Niniashvili (vs. Romania)
- (Chile) Matías Garafulic (vs. Romania)
- (Chile) Javier Eissmann (vs. Georgia)
- (Chile) Santiago Videla (vs. Georgia)
- (Chile) Clemente Armstrong (vs. Portugal)
- (Chile) Matías Garafulic (vs. Portugal)
- (Chile) Ernesto Tchimino (vs. Spain)
- (Chile) Vittorio Lastra (vs. Zimbabwe)
- (Chile) Joaquin Milesi (vs. Zimbabwe)
- (Georgia (country)) Davit Niniashvili (vs. Uruguay)
- (Georgia (country)) Mikheil Babunashvili (vs. Samoa)
- (Georgia (country)) Luka Ivanishvili (vs. Samoa)
- (Georgia (country)) Tornike Kakhoidze (vs. Chile)
- (Georgia (country)) Akaki Tabutsadze (vs. Tonga)
- (Georgia (country)) Beka Gigashvili (vs. United States)
- (Georgia (country)) Tornike Kakhoidze (vs. United States)
- (Hong Kong) Joe Barker (vs. Samoa)
- (Hong Kong) Zacceus Cinnamond (vs. Chile)
- (Hong Kong) Lachlan Doheny (vs. Chile)
- (Hong Kong) James Sawyer (vs. Chile)
- (Hong Kong) Harry Sayer (vs. Chile)
- (Hong Kong) Maxwell Threlkeld (vs. Uruguay)
- (Hong Kong) Joshua Hrstich (vs. Canada)
- (Hong Kong) Faial Solomona-Penesa (vs. Canada)
- (Hong Kong) Jack Bartlett (vs. Tonga)
- (Portugal) Martim Bello (vs. United States)
- (Portugal) José Madeira (vs. Tonga)
- (Portugal) Nuno Mascarenhas (vs. Tonga)
- (Romania) Andrei Mahu (vs. Chile)
- (Romania) Nicolas Onutu (vs. Chile)
- (Romania) Vlad Neculau (vs. Uruguay)
- (Romania) Alexandru Savin (vs. Uruguay)
- (Romania) Nicolas Onuțu (vs. Canada)
- (Samoa) Joel Lam (vs. Hong Kong)
- (Samoa) Aki Seiuli (vs. Georgia)
- (Samoa) Lolani Faleiva (vs. Romania)
- (Samoa) Richie Asiata (vs. Zimbabwe)
- (Samoa) Shaun Stevenson (vs. Zimbabwe)
- (Spain) Ekain Imaz (vs. Canada)
- (Spain) Estanislao Bay (vs. Chile)
- (Spain) Raphael Nieto (vs. Chile)
- (Spain) Gauthier Minguillon (vs. Samoa)
- (Spain) Raphael Nieto (vs. Samoa)
- (Tonga) Patrick Pellegrini (vs. Zimbabwe)
- (Tonga) Telusa Veainu (vs. Zimbabwe)
- (Tonga) John Tapueluelu (vs. Spain)
- (Tonga) Sam Moli (vs. Portugal)
- (Tonga) Veikoso Poloniati (vs. Portugal)
- (Tonga) Telusa Veainu (vs. Portugal)
- (Tonga) Fetuli Paea (vs. Georgia)
- (Tonga) Patrick Pellegrini (vs. Georgia)
- (United States) Tavite Lopeti (vs. Portugal)
- (United States) Makeen Alikhan (vs. Zimbabwe)
- (United States) Perry Mayo (vs. Spain)
- (United States) Nafi Ma'afu (vs. Romania)
- (United States) Tavite Lopeti (vs. Georgia)
- (Uruguay) Manuel Ardao (vs. Georgia)
- (Uruguay) Joaquin Myszka (vs. Georgia)
- (Uruguay) Joaquin Myszka (vs. Hong Kong)
- (Uruguay) Alfonso Vidal (vs. Hong Kong)
- (Zimbabwe) Jason Fraser (vs. Tonga)
- (Zimbabwe) Dale Lemon (vs. Chile)

== See also ==
- 2026 Nations Championship
- 2026 Men's Rugby Union Internationals
