= Takoda McMullin =

- Born: 1 May 2002 (age 24) White Rock, British Columbia, Canada
- Height: 182 cm (6 ft 0 in)
- Weight: 92 kg (203 lb; 14 st 7 lb)
- School: Earl Marriott Secondary School
- University: University of British Columbia
- Notable relative: Talon McMullin (brother)

Rugby union career
- Position(s): Fullback, Wing, Centre
- Current team: UBC Thunderbirds, Bayside Sharks
Senior career
Years	Team	Apps	(Points)
2020–	UBC Thunderbirds		
International career
Years	Team	Apps	(Points)
2022	Canada U20	1	(0)
2022	Canada A	1	(0)
2024–	Canada	7	(17)
- Correct as of 12 July 2026
National sevens team
Years	Team		Comps
2026	Canada		1
- Correct as of 12 July 2026

Takoda McMullin (born 1 May 2002) is a Canadian rugby union player who plays for the UBC Thunderbirds in the British Columbia Premier League, and the Canada national team. McMullin's primary position is fullback, and has been deployed across the outside back positions.

== Early life ==
Takoda McMullin was born in 2002 in White Rock, British Columbia. Takoda was raised in White Rock and Surrey, British Columbia alongside twin brother Talon. Both Takoda and Talon were educated at Earl Marriott Secondary School in Surrey, Vancouver Metro Area. The two excelled for the schools volleyball team, the Mariners, with Takoda being named to the first all-star team.

== Career ==
McMullin began his career with the UBC Thunderbirds in the British Columbia Premier League in 2020. He joined the schools rugby program after gradutaing from the Earl Marriott Secondary School alongside brother Talon, and future Canada international teammate Izzak Kelly.

== International career ==
=== U20s and Sevens ===
In 2021, McMullin was selected in a under-20 camp trial, having previously been a member of a Canada U18s camp in 2018. McMullin was later named in Canada U20s final 28-man roster for the 2022 U20 International Series for August. McMullin made his under-20 debut on the wing against Zimbabwe U20s, held at the University of Guelph in Ontario. Canada U20s lost 24–32.

In January 2026, McMullin, who had five senior international caps with Canada, was scheduled to make his rugby sevens debut for Canada in the SVNS 3 tournament in Dubai with the hope of winning promotion to SVNS 2. McMullin made his international sevens debut against Italy in a 33–7 win. Canada went on to win the tournament and gain promotion to SVNS 2 for 2027.

=== Canada ===
In early October 2022, McMullin was named in Canada A's squad ahead of their three-match series in the Americas Rugby Trophy (ART), a minor developmental tournament featuring Canada A, Brazil A, and Chile A. McMullin was named as Canada's starting outside centre later in the month in Canada's match against Brazil A, alongside brother Talon at inside centre. Canada won 31–14 in Mogi das Cruzes.

McMullin was named in Canada's matchday squad for their Test match against Scotland in the 2024 Summer Internationals at TD Place Stadium, Ottawa. McMullin made his international debut for Canada in the 57th minute, replacing right-wing Andrew Coe. Canada lost 12–73. McMullin was officially named Canada's 500th international player. He made another appearance in the second Test against Romania. Canada won 35–22.

The following month, McMullin was named in Canada's squad for the inaugural edition of the revamped Pacific Nations Cup (PNC), a new Americas/Oceania/Pacific Rugby World Cup qualification tournament featuring Canada, Fiji, Japan, Samoa, Tonga, and the United States. McMullin played in all three of Canada's matches, scoring in their opening match against Japan alongside brother Talon. Canada lost all of their matches.

In June 2026, McMullin was named in Canada's squad for their opening matches in the newly established Nations Cup tournament. In their first Test against Spain, McMullin scored his first international points for Canada from the tee, kicking an 84th minute conversion goal in a 42-all draw at Clarke Stadium, Edmonton. The match surpassed England and Scotland's 38-all draw for the highest-scoring draw in Test rugby.
