= Manaaki Boyle-Tiatia =

Samoan rugby union player

- Born: 25 February 2000 (age 26) Gisborne, New Zealand
- Height: 175 cm (5 ft 9 in)
- Weight: 94 kg (207 lb; 14 st 11 lb)
- School: Scots College, Wellington
- University: University of Canterbury
- Notable relative: Ace Tiatia (father)

Rugby union career
- Position: Hooker
- Current team: Highlanders / Waikato
Senior career
Years	Team	Apps	(Points)
2024–	Waikato	30	(20)
2026	Gloucester	3	(0)
2027–	Highlanders	0	(0)
- Correct as of 8 November 2026
International career
Years	Team	Apps	(Points)
2026–	Samoa	3	(5)
- Correct as of 8 November 2026

Manaaki Boyle-Tiatia (born 25 February 2000) is a New Zealand-born Samoan rugby union player, who plays for the Highlanders. His preferred position is hooker.

== Early career ==
Boyle-Tiatia was born in Gisborne and attended Scots College, Wellington where he played rugby, originally as a back. After school he attended the University of Canterbury. He plays his club rugby for University in the Waikato region having previously played club rugby in the Otago and Wellington region. He spent pre-season with the Chiefs ahead of the 2025 Super Rugby Pacific season. He is the son of former Samoan rugby union international Ace Tiatia.

== Professional career ==
Boyle-Tiatia has represented Waikato in the National Provincial Championship since 2024, being named in their squad for the 2026 Hilux NPC competition. In January 2026, he joined Gloucester on a short-term deal as injury cover, making three appearances. In October 2026, he was named in the Highlanders wider training group for the 2027 Super Rugby Pacific season.

In July 2026, Boyle-Tiatia made his debut for the Samoan national team against Hong Kong in the 2026 World Rugby Nations Cup.
