= Iacopo Bianchi =

Romania international rugby union player

- Full name: Iacopo Bianchi
- Born: 5 May 1998 (age 28) Arezzo, Italy
- Height: 1.88 m (6 ft 2 in)
- Weight: 108 kg (17 st 0 lb; 238 lb)

Rugby union career
- Position: Flanker
- Current team: Rovigo
Youth career
- Vasari Arezzo
Senior career
Years	Team	Apps	(Points)
2016−2017	F.I.R. Academy		
2017−2020	Fiamme Oro	37	(15)
2018−2020	→Zebre	12	(5)
2020−2026	Zebre	65	(20)
2021	→Fiamme Oro	2	(0)
2026−	Rovigo		
- Correct as of 21 Nov 2026
International career
Years	Team	Apps	(Points)
2017−2018	Italy Under 20	14	(5)
2022	Italy A	1	(5)
2026−	Romania	4	(0)
- Correct as of 21 Nov 2026

Iacopo Bianchi (Note: There are different spellings of Bianchi's name in use. Zebre rugby lists the spelling of his first name as Iacopo, which is also used by the Pro14 in their news sources, but several other website lists his name as Jacopo Bianchi. Both variants yield several search results from reliable sources. The player hasn't publicly commented on his preferred name spelling.) (born 5 May 1998) is an Italian-born rugby union player that represents Romania at international level. He plays for Rovigo in Serie A Elite as flanker.

== Club career ==
His usual position is flanker and he currently plays for Rovigo in Serie A Elite.

For the 2018–2019 Pro14 season, Bianchi was named as Additional Player for Zebre and in the 2019–2020 Pro14 season he was named as Permit Player ever for Zebre.

He signed a professional contract with Zebre in 2020, where he stayed until his move to Rovigo in 2026.

== International career ==
In 2017 and 2018, Bianchi was named in the Italy Under 20 squad. On 26 May he was called in Italy A squad for the South African tour in the 2022 mid-year rugby union tests against Namibia and Currie Cup XV team.

In July 2026, he was called up by Romania in the squad for the 2026 World Rugby Nations Cup, since he qualifies to represent them through his mother. He made his debut from the bench against Uruguay.
