= Bachuki Tchumbadze =

Georgian rugby union player

- Born: 30 November 2001 (age 24) Tbilisi, Georgia
- Height: 182 cm (6 ft 0 in)
- Weight: 125 kg (276 lb; 19 st 10 lb)

Rugby union career
- Position: Prop
- Current team: Exeter Chiefs
Senior career
Years	Team	Apps	(Points)
2023–2025	Black Lion	14	(0)
2025–	Exeter Chiefs	3	(0)
- Correct as of 7 October 2025
International career
Years	Team	Apps	(Points)
2025–	Georgia	1	(0)
- Correct as of 7 October 2025

Bachuki Tchumbadze (born 30 November 2001) is a Georgian rugby union player, who plays for the Exeter Chiefs. His preferred position is prop.

== Early career ==
Tchumbadze was born in Tbilisi. He played his club rugby in Georgia for Batumi.

== Professional career ==
Tchumbadze's first professional team was Black Lion who he joined in 2023. He made his debut for the side in the 2023–24 EPCR Challenge Cup against Gloucester. He made a further two appearances in the competition that season and also represented the side on the Rugby Europe Super Cup. Ahead of the 2025–26 Premiership Rugby season, he joined Exeter Chiefs.

Tchumbadze made his debut for Georgia in 2025, making his debut against the Netherlands.
