= Beka Shvangiradze =

Georgian rugby union player

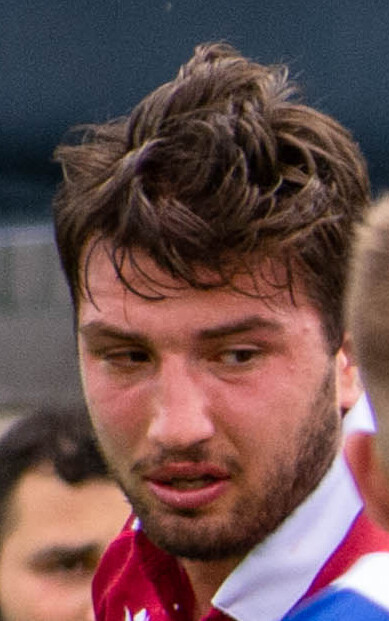
- Full name: Beka Shvangiradze
- Born: 12 June 2002 (age 24) Georgia
- Height: 191 cm (6 ft 3 in)
- Weight: 101 kg (223 lb; 15 st 13 lb)

Rugby union career
- Position: Backrow
- Current team: Lyon
Youth career
- 20??-2020: RC Aia Kutaisi
- 2020-2021: Aurillac
Senior career
| Years | Team | Apps | (Points) |
| 2021-2024 | Aurillac | 33 | (45) |
| 2024- | Lyon | 0 | (0) |
- Correct as of 2 September 2024
International career
| Years | Team | Apps | (Points) |
| 2022 | Georgia under-20 | 4 | (15) |
| 2022- | Georgia | 3 | (0) |
- Correct as of 2 September 2024

Beka Shvangiradze (born 12 June 2002) is a Georgian rugby union player who plays as a backrower for Top 14 side Lyon OU.

== Club career ==
Shvangiradze began his career at Georgian side RC Aia Kutaisi. In 2020 he joined French side Aurillac spending a year with the espoirs squad, winning the National Championship. He later made his senior debut coming off the bench in a 54–24 loss against Carcassonne.

In 2024 he signed a four-season contract with Top 14 side Lyon OU, joining until June 2028.

== International career ==
Shvangiradze featured for the Georgian under-20s side in the 2022 Summer Series. He was the competition's top tackler with 53 tackles in 4 appearances. He also had the second most offloads for any forward with 4. He scored 3 tries: one against Wales and a brace in a win against Scotland.

He made his senior debut coming off the bench in a 23–14 win over Portugal.
