= Paula Latu =

New Zealand rugby union player

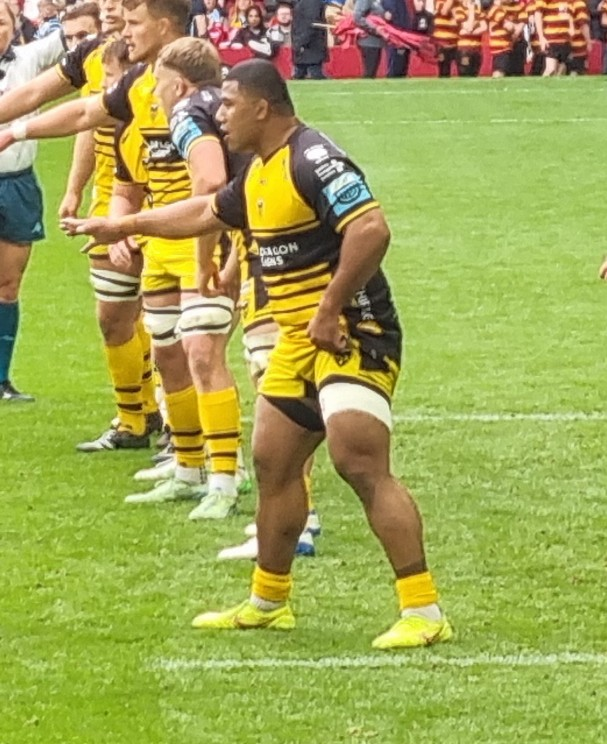
- Judgement Day 2025
- Full name: Paula F. Latu
- Born: 14 February 1996 (age 30) Tonga
- Height: 187 cm (6 ft 2 in)
- Weight: 123 kg (271 lb; 19 st 5 lb)
- School: Gisborne Boys' High School

Rugby union career
- Position: Prop
- Current team: Dragons
Senior career
Years	Team	Apps	(Points)
2021–2022, 2024	Southland	19	(5)
2024–	Dragons	7	(5)
- Correct as of 27 March 2025
International career
Years	Team	Apps	(Points)
2023–	Tonga	5	(0)
- Correct as of 27 March 2025

Paula Latu (born 14 February 1996) is a Tongan rugby union player, who currently plays as a prop for Dragons RFC in the United Rugby Championship and European Rugby Challenge Cup. He also plays for Southland in New Zealand's domestic National Provincial Championship competition. He has represented Tonga internationally.

One of 12 siblings, Latu hails from the village of Mataika and is an elder brother of New Zealand under-20s and Tonga international Penikolo Latu, moving with his family at age 14 to New Zealand. He attended Gisborne Boys' High School.

A tighthead prop with Southland, Latu gained his first cap for Tonga against Canada in Nukuʻalofa in 2023 and made Toutai Kefu's squad for the 2023 Rugby World Cup, where he appeared in the final group match against Romania.

In December 2024, he signed a short-term deal with Welsh club Dragons as injury cover for Leon Brown.

== See also ==
- List of Tonga national rugby union players
