= Jeremy Trevithick =

Rugby player (born 2002)

- Born: 29 January 2002 (age 24) Beirut, Lebanon
- Height: 1.86 m (6 ft 1 in)
- Weight: 97 kg (214 lb; 15 st 4 lb)

Rugby union career
- Position: Winger
Senior career
Years	Team	Apps	(Points)
2020–2021	CR El Salvador		
2021–2023	CA Brive		
International career
Years	Team	Apps	(Points)
2026-	Spain		
National sevens team
Years	Team		Comps
2024–	Spain 7s		

Jeremy Trevithick (born 29 January 2002) is a rugby union player who plays as a winger. Born in Lebanon, he is a Spain national rugby union team and Spain Sevens international.

== Early and personal life ==
Trevithick was born in Beirut, Lebanon, to a Lebanese mother and a British father. When he was three, the family moved to Estepona, in the province of Málaga, southern Spain. From a young age, he took up from his grandfather who was a rugby union referee. He has studied remotely for a degree in Business Administration.

== Sports career ==
Trevithick began playing rugby union at the age of 8 years-old, at Marbella Rugby Club. At the age of 18 years-old he moved to Valladolid to play senior rugby with CR El Salvador in 2020, later playing with the U23 team of French club CA Brive. He was the second top try scorer for Spain at the 2021 Rugby Europe U20 Championship, making the team of the tournament as they won the championship.

He joined the Spain national rugby sevens team for the 2023–24 season, and made his debut in February 2024 at the 2024 Canada Sevens. He was part of the Spain team that finished runners-up at the 2024 Dubai Sevens and third in the regular season overall standings of the 2024–25 SVNS. They then finished as series runners-up in the series finale at the 2025 USA Sevens in May 2025, with Trevithick scoring a last-minute try to ensure Spain reached the semi-finals with a win over Fiji.

He continued with the Spain Sevens, and scored two tries in Spain's victory over Great Britain Sevens at the 2026 Canada Sevens, during the 2025–26 SVNS series as Spain reached the final. He was also a try scorer in the final as Spain were defeated by South Africa. His performances that season included tries in an upset-win over South Africa and against Australia as Spain reached the semi-finals at the 2026 Hong Kong Sevens. In June 2026, he was named in the SVNS Team of the Season. That month, he was called-up to the 15-a-side Spain national rugby union team for the World Rugby Nations Cup and his debut off the bench in Spain's 32-19 win over Tonga in Edmonton on 11 July.
