= Matt Worley =

English rugby union player

- Born: Matthew Worley; 6 September 1997 (age 29) Plymouth, Devon, England
- Height: 1.81 m (5 ft 11 in)
- Weight: 84 kg (13 st 3 lb; 185 lb)
- School: South Island School

Rugby union career
- Position(s): Fullback, Wing
- Current team: Hong Kong
Senior career
Years	Team	Apps	(Points)
2015–2018	Racing 92	1	(0)
2018–2019	Northampton Saints	2	(0)
2018–2025	Bedford Blues	116	(245)
- Correct as of 18 May 2025
International career
Years	Team	Apps	(Points)
2016–2017	Hong Kong U20	7	(26)
2022–	Hong Kong	15	(85)
- Correct as of 5 July 2025

Matt Worley (born 6 September 1997) is a professional rugby union player currently playing for the Hong Kong national rugby union team. He previously played for Bedford Blues in the English RFU Championship. He plays at the fullback and wing positions. Since 2016 Worley has competed for Hong Kong at international level. First with the under-20 side in the 2016 and 2017 World Rugby U20 Trophy, before making his debut for the Hong Kong senior side in 2022.

== Background ==
Worley moved to Hong Kong aged five due to his father's work commitments. He began playing rugby in the Hong Kong Football Club's Mini Rugby programme. He attended South Island School where he played secondary school rugby. Appearing for Hong Kong at age group level, he played the majority of his junior career at scrum half. Worley represented Hong Kong at under 16, 18 and under 20 level.

== Club career ==
Whilst playing junior and schools rugby in Hong Kong, Worley was offered the opportunity to spend four weeks with Racing 92. Primarily a PR stunt, the arrangement was facilitated by joint sponsor for Racing 92 and the Hong Kong Football Club Rugby Section, Natixis. The youngster quickly impressed and stayed with Racing 92 on an academy contract. He moved from scrum half to full back after language barriers prevented him from effectively managing the 9 position.

Worley featured for the Racing Espoirs during their title winning under-23's French league campaign. His success with the Racing development team earned him his first senior contract with the club in 2017. Worley's senior debut came during Racing's Natixis Rugby Cup bout against Cell C Sharks. Racing lost the game, 31–14.

In May 2018, it was announced that Worley had signed to the Northampton Saints senior academy. He made his senior debut for the club in a game against Bristol Bears in the Premiership Rugby Cup. His debut makes Worley the 1998th Northampton Saint. In March 2019, it was announced that Worley will leave Northampton Saints. During the 2018/2019 season Worley was dual registered with Bedford Blues where he made 8 appearances scoring 5 tries. In March 2019, it was announced that Worley had signed with Bedford Blues ahead of the 2019/2020 season.

Making over 100 appearances for the club, Worley established himself as one of the league’s top finishers. Bedford Blues notably achieved a second-place finish in the RFU Championship in the 2024–25 season, their highest league standing since 2012.

On 18 May 2025, it was announced that Worley would depart Bedford Blues to return to Hong Kong national rugby union team in pursuit of a place in the national squad for the 2027 Rugby World Cup in Australia. Following his return, Worley helped Hong Kong secure qualification after winning the Asia Rugby Emirates Championship for a sixth consecutive time. He finished as the competition’s top try scorer for Hong Kong, scoring five tries in three matches.

As of 2025, Worley holds an international test record of 17 tries in 15 appearances, marking him as one of the leading scorers for the Hong Kong national team.
