= Javier Carrasco =

Chile international rugby union player

- Born: 24 August 1997 (age 29)
- Height: 180 cm (5 ft 11 in)
- Weight: 118 kg (260 lb; 18 st 8 lb)

Rugby union career
- Position: Prop
Senior career
Years	Team	Apps	(Points)
2020–	Selknam		
International career
Years	Team	Apps	(Points)
2021–	Chile	39	

Javier Carrasco (born 24 August 1997) is a Chilean rugby union player. He plays for Chile internationally, and for Selknam in the Super Rugby Americas competition. He competed in the 2023 Rugby World Cup.

== Career ==
In 2018, he joined Spanish club, Belenos from Santander.

Carrasco played for Chilean franchise, Selknam, in the Super Rugby Americas competition.

He was called up to the Chilean squad for the 2023 Rugby World Cup in France. He featured in the matches against Japan, and Samoa. He returned to the starting lineup for the final game against Argentina.
