= Fatongia Paea =

New Zealand rugby union player

- Born: 4 September 1999 (age 27) Tonga
- Height: 184 cm (6 ft 0 in)
- Weight: 125 kg (276 lb; 19 st 10 lb)

Rugby union career
- Position: Prop
- Current team: Marist University North Harbour
Senior career
Years	Team	Apps	(Points)
2020	Auckland	1	(0)
2021–	North Harbour	20	(5)
2023–	Houston SaberCats		
- Correct as of 26 June 2023

Fatongia Paea (born 1 January 2000) is a New Zealand rugby union player who plays for Houston SaberCats in the Major League Rugby. His playing position is prop.
