= Ilia Spanderashvili =

Georgia international rugby union player

- Born: 10 September 1997 (age 29) Tbilisi Georgia
- Height: 1.89 m (6 ft 2 in)
- Weight: 103 kg (16 st 3 lb; 227 lb)

Rugby union career
- Position: Flanker
Senior career
Years	Team	Apps	(Points)
2019-2023	Lokomotiv Penza	43	(35)
2023-2024	Black Lion	8	(10)
2024-	Valence Romans	39	(25)
- Correct as of 2 August 2024
International career
Years	Team	Apps	(Points)
2016-2017	Georgia U20	14	(15)
2021–	Georgia	8	(10)
- Correct as of 2 August 2024

Ilia Spanderashvili (born 10 September 1997) is a Georgian rugby union player. His position is flanker, and he currently plays for Valence Romans and the Georgia national team. He was a captain of Georgia U20 in 2017, during the famous victory (26–25) against Argentina U20, scoring a try on 12th minute.

== Honours ==
=== Lokomotiv Penza ===
- Russian Professional Rugby League
  - Champions: (1) 2022–23
  - Runners-up: (2) 2020–21, 2021–22

=== Black Lion ===
- Rugby Europe Super Cup
  - Champions: (1) 2023

=== Georgia ===
- Rugby Europe Championship
  - Champions: (2) 2021, 2024
  - Player of the Tournament: (1) 2024
