= Ace Tiatia =

- Full name: Solomona Asora Adrian Tiatia
- Born: 18 June 1976 (age 50) Wellington, New Zealand
- Height: 6 ft 2 in (188 cm)
- Weight: 248 lb (112 kg)

Rugby union career
- Position(s): Hooker, Flanker
Senior career
Years	Team	Apps	(Points)
2003–05	Harlequins		
2005–06	Pau		
2006–09	Agen		
2009–10	Bayonne		
Super Rugby
Years	Team	Apps	(Points)
1997	Highlanders	6	(5)
1998	Crusaders	2	(0)
1999	Hurricanes	1	(0)
International career
Years	Team	Apps	(Points)
2001	Samoa	7	(0)

Solomona Asora Adrian "Ace" Tiatia (born 18 June 1976) is a New Zealand-born former professional rugby union player who represented Samoa in international rugby.

== Biography ==
A Wellington native, Tiatia is the nephew of Samoa international Asora Simanu and inherited the nickname "Ace" from his uncle, with whom he shares a birthday. He is the younger brother of All Blacks loose forward Filo Tiatia.

Tiatia, a NZ Colts representative, was capped seven times by Samoa. He played in the Super 12 for Highlanders, Crusaders and Hurricanes during the late 1990s, before embarking on a professional career in Europe. A hooker, Tiatia had two seasons with English club Harlequins, then from 2005 to 2010 plied his trade in France.

== See also ==
- List of Samoa national rugby union players
