= Nikoloz Sutidze =

Georgian rugby union player

- Full name: Nikoloz Sutidze
- Born: 1 September 2003 (age 23) Tbilisi, Georgia
- Height: 180 cm (5 ft 11 in)
- Weight: 104 kg (229 lb; 16 st 5 lb)

Rugby union career
- Position: Hooker
- Current team: La Rochelle
Youth career
- –2021: Lelo
Senior career
| Years | Team | Apps | (Points) |
| 2021– | La Rochelle | 21 | (10) |
- Correct as of 4 April 2026
International career
| Years | Team | Apps | (Points) |
| 2021 | Georgia U18 | | |
| 2021–23 | Georgia U20 | | |
| 2025– | Georgia | 6 | (0) |
- Correct as of 4 April 2026

Nikoloz (Nika) Sutidze (Georgian: ნიკოლოზ სუთიძე, born 1 September 2003) is a Georgian rugby union player who plays for French Top 14 club Stade Rochelais and the Georgian national team as a hooker.

Previously a member of the national youth teams, he is the winner of the 2021 U18 European Championship.

== Club career ==
Sutidze started playing rugby from the age of five at local club Lelo in Tbilisi. A third row initially, he switched to the hooker position after arrival at French top-league side Stade Rochelais in 2021. Sutidze made his professional debut as a substitute in a 43–22 win over Lyon on 5 October 2024 and took part in nine league games of his first season. He scored a try against the same opponents in his fourth appearance for the club in February next year.

His current contract with the club is due to expire in 2028.

== International career ==
Although aged 17, Sutidze was considered prolific enough to be selected to the U20 team for an international tournament held in South Africa in the summer of 2021. He featured in all four games and helped the team with a try against Italy.

Two months later, he joined the U18 team represented at the European Championship. He was in the starting line-up for his team which won the tournament after a 27–0 win over Belgium and secured a third consecutive cup.

In 2022, Sutidze was called up again to the U20s taking part in six nations Summer Series hosted by Italy.

Sutidze drew interest from the national team coach Richard Cockerill who included him in the squad for a European Cup semifinal clash against Romania in March 2024. He made first appearance for the team in a friendly game against Japan on 22 November 2025.

== Honours ==
Rugby Europe Under-18 Championship winner: 2021
