= Earl Marriott Secondary School =

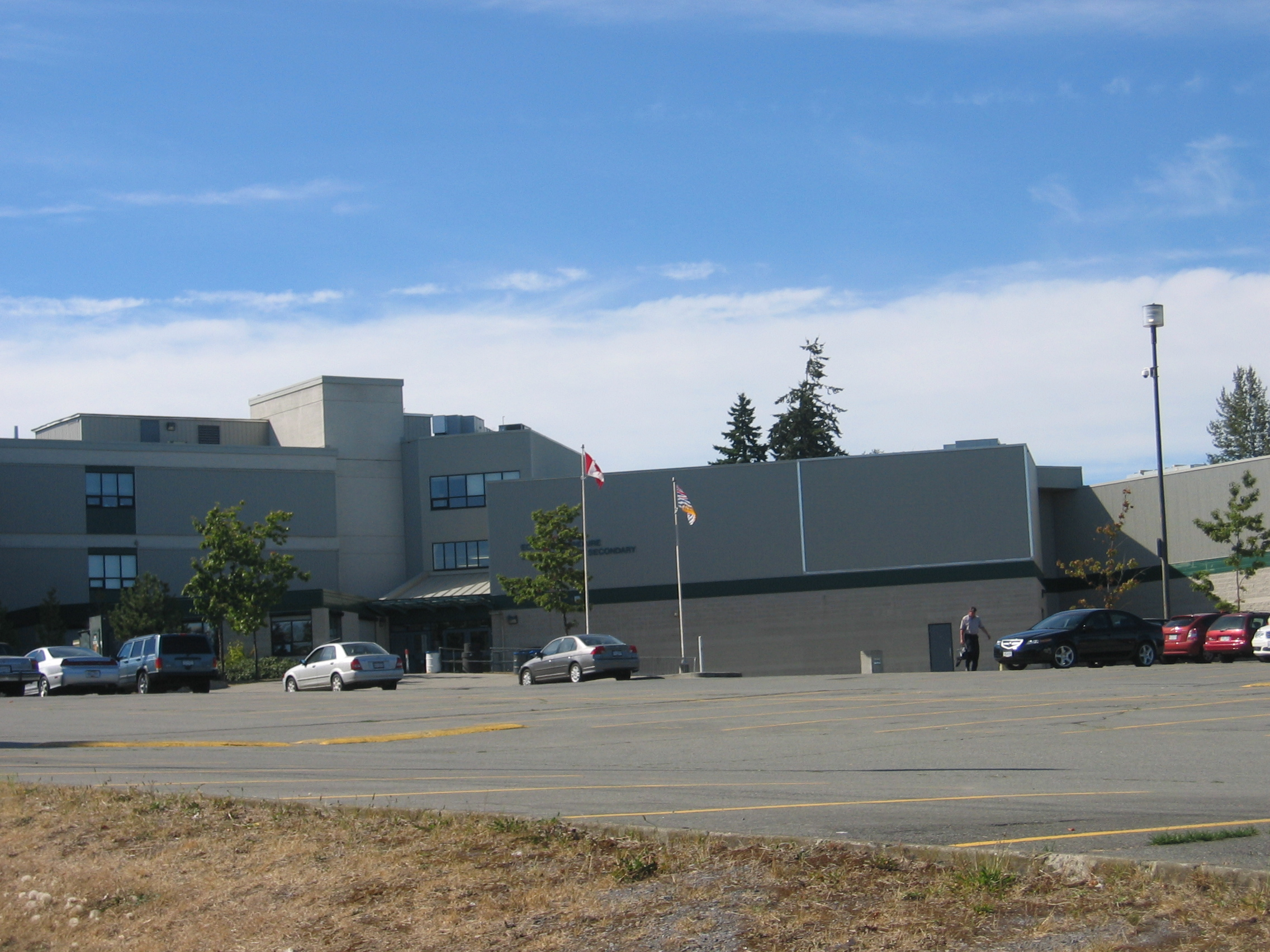

Location
- 15751 16 Ave; Surrey, British Columbia, V4A 1S1; Canada; 49°1′54″N 122°47′7.9″W

Information
- School type: Public, high school
- Motto: To Strive, To Seek, To Find, and Not to Yield
- Founded: 1973
- School board: School District 36 Surrey
- School number: 3636105
- Principal: Graham Magnusson
- Staff: 120+
- Grades: 8–12
- Enrollment: ▲1470 (2025-2026)
- Language: English/French
- Area: White Rock/South Surrey
- Colours: Green and White, occasionally orange
- Team name: The Mariners
- Website: www.surreyschools.ca/earlmarriott
- Last updated: July 2023

Earl Marriott Secondary (EMS) is a public high school in the Vancouver suburb of Surrey, British Columbia, Canada, and is part of School District 36 Surrey. It is referred to as the 'Home of the Mariners'. It is located on the edge of city limits, on 16th Avenue (which straddles the border between Surrey and White Rock).

== History ==
Originally White Rock Secondary School, Earl Marriott Secondary was founded in 1973 and named after its first Principal, Earl Marriott, who eventually became Superintendent of Surrey School District #36.

Earl Marriott has a close relationship with the Semiahmoo First Nation community. The institution has a history and custom of cooperation with First Nation peoples; the school hosts an annual Pow Wow and students have visited Haida Gwaii to engage in cultural sharing.

EMS puts on either a play or musical out of the indwelling Wheelhouse Theatre every year (on a rotational basis; i.e.: play, musical, play, etc.).

== Academics ==
Earl Marriott is one of four French immersion high schools in Surrey and offers full course loads in both French and English. About 25 per cent of students are French immersion and attend from across the Semiahmoo Peninsula.

Earl Marriott offers courses including physical education, all major humanities and sciences as well as art, home economics, info tech, and trades courses. It is one of few schools that offer competitive co-op experiences for its students. Earl Marriott offers a liberal arts co-op, as well as a mechanical (skilled trades) co-op. EMS also offers 3 Advanced Placement (AP) classes: AP Psychology, AP Calculus AB, and AP Statistics.

Earl Marriott has two semesters per school year (2022–2023). A full load of classes would consist of four classes per semester.

== Athletics ==
The school competes in the Sandcastle Cup, an annual rugby game between the Mariners and Semiahmoo Secondary School Thunderbirds.

- Boys 2000-2001 AAA Provincial Cross Country Champions
- Girls 2002-2003 AAA Provincial Basketball Champions
- 2009 Skills Canada Champion - Web Design
- 2009 Delta Police Golf Tournament Winners
- 2010 Fraser Valley Sr. boys AAA rugby
- 2010 Delta Police Golf Tournament winners
- 2014 AA Tier 2 Football Champion (first championship in school's 10 years of football)
- 2015 AA Tier 2 Football Champion (played at BC Place)
- 2016 Provincial Girls Track and Field Champions
- 2016 Provincial Junior Girls Volleyball Champions
- 2017 AA Undefeated Football Champions Grade 8
- 2018 Provincial Girls Curling Champions
- 2018 Senior Boys Volleyball Provincial Champions
- 2021 Grade 9 Girls Volleyball Provincial Champions
- 2022 Junior Girls Volleyball Provincial Champions

== Wheelhouse Theatre ==
The Wheelhouse Theatre is a 280-seat proscenium theater located at Earl Marriott Secondary School. The Wheelhouse's primary usage is as a classroom and training facility for students pursuing theatre, and is also available for rent by local people. It is managed by the school and the Wheelhouse Theatre Society, community volunteers who raise funds for the theatre. 2022's production of She Kills Monsters marked the 45th year of major theatre production by Earl Marriott Theatre Company.

== Notable alumni ==
- Gigi Saul Guerrero, horror-movie director
- Izzak Kelly, Rugby Player
- Jim Mullin, Canadian broadcaster
- Colten Teubert, ice hockey player
- Glenn Wool, stand-up comedian
- Seok Matthew, K-pop idol in Zerobaseone
- Adam Svensson, Professional Golfer
