= Logan Asplin =

New Zealand rugby union coach

- Born: 1988 (age 37–38) Hamilton, New Zealand

Rugby union career
- Position: Head Coach
- Current team: Hong Kong
Coaching career
- Years: Team
- 2022–2025: Hong Kong Football Club
- 2023–2025: Hong Kong China (Asst.)
- 2023: Hong Kong China U20
- 2025–2026: Hong Kong China
- 2026–: Hong Kong China (Asst.)

Logan Asplin is a New Zealand rugby union coach, who is currently an assistant coach for the Hong Kong men's national team.

== Career ==
As a coach, Asplin first started out coaching in 2012, specifically coaching within the New Zealand premier 1st XV secondary school league with Hamilton Boys' High School.

During his time coaching within the New Zealand schools system, he led Hamilton Boys to five regional titles, whilst also gaining coaching experiences coaching Waikato Chiefs U18 and New Zealand U18 sevens.

In 2022, Asplin left New Zealand and he and his family relocated to Hong Kong, where he became the head coach of Hong Kong Football Club, his first major coaching position. It was during his time with HKFC that allowed Asplin to be involved in international rugby, and became an assistant coach for the Hong Kong nation men's team for the 2023 Asia Rugby Championship.

Later that year, he took the regains as head coach for Hong Kong U20 for the relaunch of the World Rugby U20 Trophy competition, where the national age-grade side lost all their games to finish in eight place.

The following year, Asplin stepped away from the U20 set-up to focus on the senior men's side drive for 2027 Rugby World Cup qualification, which coincided with the same time the U20 programme would be running.

In July 2025, Asplin (along with Andrew Douglas) led the side to World Cup qualification, the first time that Hong Kong had secured qualification on the world stage.

In August 2025, Asplin became the head coach of the national team after Andrew Douglas stepped up to a Director of Rugby type role.

In his first campaign, he led Hong Kong to three losses during the 2025 end-of-year rugby union internationals; a 14–59 loss to Japan A, 31–63 loss to Australian outfit Brumbies and a 58–12 loss to Portugal in his first official test match. He later led the side to a seventh consecutive Asian title in June 2026 with wins over Sri Lanka and South Korea. He also led the side to an historic win over Uruguay (40–42) during the in round 3 of the 2026 World Rugby Nations Cup Americas-Pacific Series.

In August 2026, he stepped to the side to return as an assistant coach to Andrew Douglas, who returned as head coach.

Sporting positions
Preceded by (New Zealand) Andrew Douglas	Hong Kong national rugby union coach 2025–2026	Succeeded by (New Zealand) Andrew Douglas
