= Pierre-Henry Broncan =

- Born: Pierre-Henry Broncan; 22 May 1974 (age 52) Auch
- Height: 1.82 m (6 ft 0 in)
- Notable relative: Henry Broncan (father)

Rugby union career
- Position: Scrum-half
Amateur team(s)
| Years | Team | Apps | (Points) |
| 1992–1998 | Lombez Samatan Club | | |
Senior career
| Years | Team | Apps | (Points) |
| 1998–2000 | Auch | | |
| 2000–2003 | Montauban | | |
| 2003–2004 | Béziers | | |
| 2004–2006 | Mont-de-Marsan | | |
International career
| Years | Team | Apps | (Points) |
- Germany
Coaching career
- Years: Team
- 2006–2007: Blagnac
- 2007–2009: Auch
- 2009–2011: Aurillac
- 2011–2012: Colomiers
- 2012–2014: Tarbes
- 2015–2018: Toulouse (Asst. Coach)
- 2020–2023: Castres Olympique
- 2023: Australia (Asst. Coach)
- 2023–2026: Brive
- 2026-: Georgia

Pierre-Henry Broncan (born 22 May 1974) is a former French rugby union player, who now coaches at international level for the Georgian National Rugby Team.

== Player career ==
Pierre-Henry Broncan is a former French rugby union scrum-half whose playing career laid the foundation for his later success as one of Europe's most respected coaches.

Born in Auch, Broncan developed through the youth system at Lombez Samatan Club between 1982 and 1992, before progressing into senior rugby in 1993, where he became known for his intelligence, tactical awareness, and leadership from the base of the scrum.

From Lombez Samatan, Broncan later played for several prominent French clubs. Firstly at Auch, before later representing Montauban, Béziers and Mont-de-Marsan.

During his time at Montauban, he helped the club win the Pro D2 championship in 2000/01 and secure promotion to France's top division for the 2001–02 Top 16 season.

Broncan also earned international honours, representing Germany who he qualified through his maternal heritage.

After a career affected by injuries, he retired from professional rugby at the age of 32 in 2006, where he immediately transitioned into coaching.

== Coaching career ==
Broncan's first coaching role came in 2006, where he became Head Coach of Blagnac in Fédérale 1 for a single season. In that same season, he led the side to promotion to Pro D2 ahead of the 2007–08 season.

In 2007, he then succeeded his dad Henry Broncan as Head Coach of Auch, who had just been promoted to the Top 14 for the 2007–08 season. Despite the promotion, they were relegated back down to the ProD2 at the conclusion of the season after finished bottom with three wins.

Broncan spent another season with Auch, before moving onto Aurillac in 2009 for two seasons in the ProD2. He later became Head Coach of Colomiers following their relegation to Fédérale 1 in 2011, where he helped helped the side be promoted back up to the ProD2 ahead of the 2012–13 season.

Despite helping another team secure promotion, Broncan moved on to coach Tarbes in 2012, where he remained for two seasons where Tarbes finished sixth place, narrowly behind the promotion play-offs, in both seasons.

In 2014, Broncan joined Top14 side Bordeaux Bègles's backroom staff, where he led up recruitment and player development at the club. Originally, he had signed for two seasons, but after a season he left the club to join Toulouse after being appointed as Sporting Director He later took up the role as defence coach at the club along side his recruitment responsibilities.

In 2018, Broncan left French rugby after being appointed in a recruitment and strategic analysis role at Bath under Todd Blackadder and then Stuart Hooper. In the summer of 2020, Broncan left Bath during the COVID-19 pandemic and returned to France.

Upon his return, he joined Castres Olympique in gis breakthrough at the highest level. Initially he was signed to work on recruitment and defence, but he was later promoted to head coach ahead of the 2021–22 Top 14 season. In his first season as Head Coach, he led the side to an historic top-of-the-table finish in the regular season and led them to the Final for the first time since 2018. However, they lost the final to Montpellier 29–10.

In February 2023, Castres sacked Broncan and replaced him with Jeremy Davidson.

In May 2023, Broncan was announced as part of Eddie Jones coaching staff for the Wallabies ahead of the 2023 Rugby World Cup, but later was let go after a poor World Cup along with the whole coaching staff.

Following the World Cup, Broncan returned to France to become Head Coach of Brive, where he was tasked with leading one of the country's historic clubs back towards the Top 14. After three seasons where Brive made the promotion play-offs every season, Broncan opted not to renew his contract at the club and instead became Head Coach of the Georgian National Rugby as they build towards the 2027 Men's Rugby World Cup.

| Preceded by (Italy) Marco Bortolami (Caretaker) | Georgian national rugby coach 2026– | Succeeded by Incumbent |
