= Luka Ivanishvili =

Georgian rugby union player

- Full name: Luka Ivanishvili
- Born: 25 October 2001 (age 25) Georgia
- Height: 1.88 m (6 ft 2 in)
- Weight: 108 kg (238 lb)

Rugby union career
- Position: Flanker / Number 8
- Current team: Bristol Bears
Senior career
Years	Team	Apps	(Points)
2021–2025	Black Lion	30	(55)
2025–	Bristol Bears	0	(0)
- Correct as of 30 November 2023
International career
Years	Team	Apps	(Points)
2021	Georgia under-20		
2022–	Georgia	23	(10)
- Correct as of 3 July 2024

Luka Ivanishvili (born 25 November 2001 in Georgia) is a Georgian rugby union player who plays for Bristol Bears. His playing position is flanker or number 8.

== Career ==
He was named in the Black Lion squad for the inaugural Rugby Europe Super Cup, and later for the 2022 Currie Cup First Division.

On 31 July 2025, Ivanishvili would move to England to join Bristol Bears in the Premiership Rugby for the 2025–26 season.

== International career ==
Ivanishvili made his international debut in the 2022 Rugby Europe Championship, in a 23–26 win. He was named in the Georgia squad for the 2023 Rugby World Cup, he made his Rugby World Cup debut scoring a try in a 35–15 loss to Australia.
