= Izzak Kelly =

Canadian rugby union player

- Born: April 9, 2000 (age 26)
- Height: 6 ft 6 in (198 cm)
- Weight: 275 lb (125 kg)
- School: Earl Marriott Secondary School
- University: University of British Columbia

Rugby union career
- Position: Lock
Senior career
Years	Team	Apps	(Points)
2024	Pontypool	1	
International career
Years	Team	Apps	(Points)
2023–	Canada	15	(0)

Izzak Kelly (born April 9, 2000) is a Canadian international rugby union player.

Kelly was raised by his mother Leeanne in White Rock, British Columbia and attended Earl Marriott Secondary School.

A 6 ft 6 in lock, Kelly is a Bayside Sharks product and played varsity rugby for the UBC Thunderbirds. He made his debut for the Canada national team in 2023 against Tonga in Nukuʻalofa and signed with Welsh club Pontypool RFC in 2024.

== See also ==
- List of Canada national rugby union players
