= Felipe Aliaga =

Uruguayan rugby union player

- Born: Felipe Aliaga Bonnet; 14 September 1999 (age 27) Uruguay
- Height: 1.93 m (6 ft 4 in)
- Weight: 110 kg (17 st; 240 lb)

Rugby union career
- Position: Lock
Senior career
Years	Team	Apps	(Points)
2021–	Peñarol	0	(0)
- Correct as of 2 February 2021
International career
Years	Team	Apps	(Points)
2019–2020	Uruguay U20s	7	(0)
2020–	Uruguay XV	3	(0)
2020–	Uruguay	5	(0)
- Correct as of 9 September 2023

Felipe Aliaga (born 14 September 1999) is a Uruguayan rugby union player, currently playing for Súper Liga Americana de Rugby side Peñarol.

His preferred position is lock.

== Professional career ==
Aliaga signed for Súper Liga Americana de Rugby side Peñarol, ahead of the 2021 Súper Liga Americana de Rugby season.

He has also represented the Uruguay national team.
