= David Gérard =

France international rugby union player (born 1977)

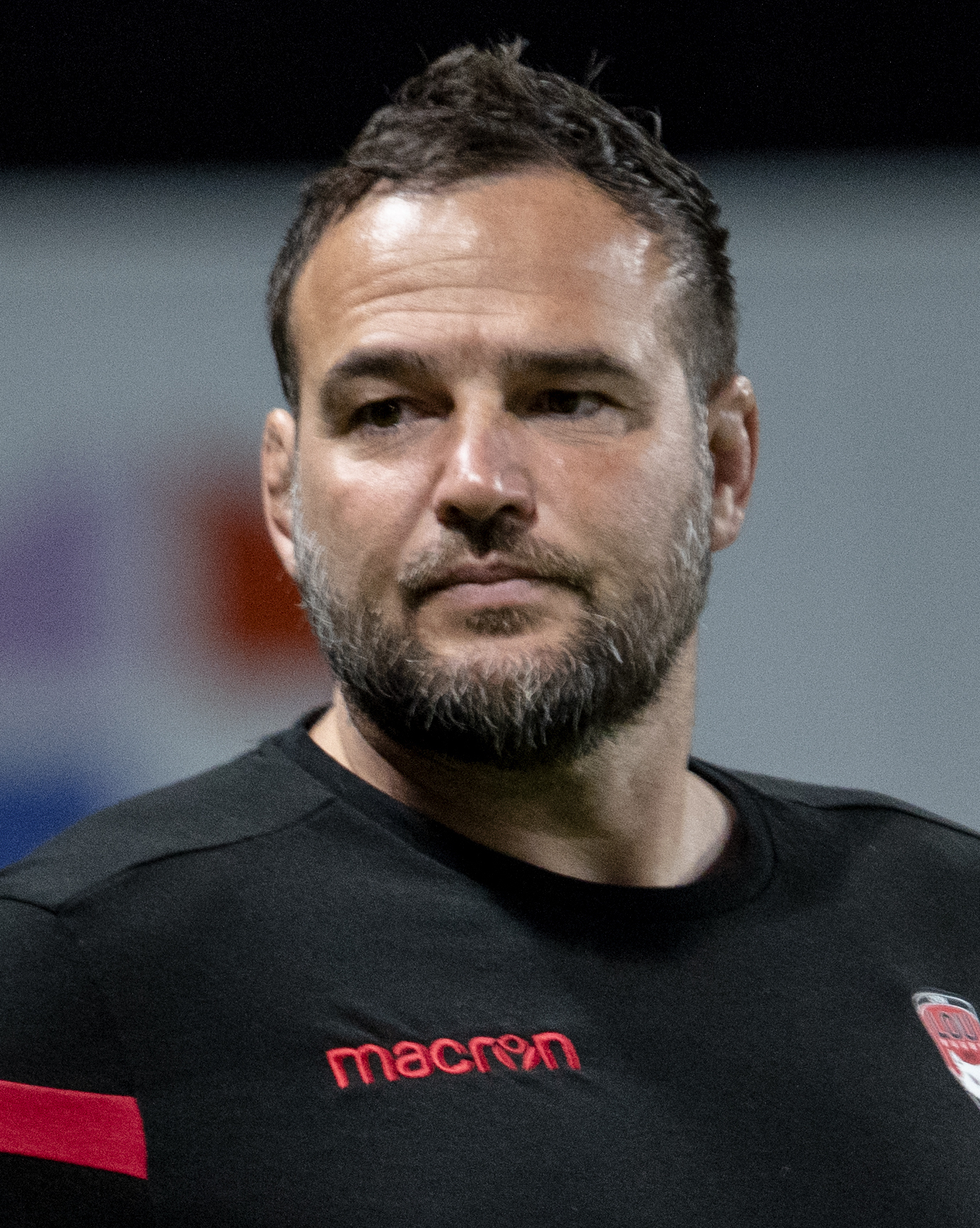
- Born: 26 November 1977 (age 48) Toulon, France
- Height: 1.99 m (6 ft 6 1/2 in)
- Weight: 118 kg (18 st 8 lb)

Rugby union career
- Position: lock
Senior career
Years	Team	Apps	(Points)
1990–1999	RC Toulonnais		
1999-2000	Bègles		
2000-2006	Toulouse		
2006-2007	Northampton		
2007-2009	Racing		
2009-	Marseille		
International career
Years	Team	Apps	(Points)
1999	France	1	(0)

David Gérard (born 26 November 1977 in Toulon), is a former French rugby union player. He played as a lock.

He started his career with RC Toulonnais. He also played with Stade Toulousain with which he won several titles, including the 2003 and 2005 Heineken Cup Finals (the former he started and the latter he was a replacement). He earned his only cap with the French national team on 16 June 1999 against Tonga. He was appointed as Romania's Head coach in January 2024.

== Honours ==
- Stade Toulousain
  - French rugby champion 2001
  - Heineken Cup 2003 and 2005
- Racing Métro 92
  - Rugby Pro D2 2009
