= Matías Garafulic =

Chile international rugby union player

Matias Garafulic
- Full name: Matías Garafulic Schar
- Born: 1 September 2000 (age 26) Santiago, Chile
- Height: 1.83 m (6 ft 0 in)
- Weight: 90 kg (198 lb; 14 st 2 lb)

Rugby union career
- Position(s): Centre, Wing
- Current team: Selknam
Senior career
Years	Team	Apps	(Points)
2020–	Selknam	25	(101)
- Correct as of 28 August 2023
International career
Years	Team	Apps	(Points)
2020	Chile A	3	(0)
2021–	Chile	12	(15)
- Correct as of 28 August 2023
National sevens team
Years	Team		Comps
2020	Chile		2
- Correct as of 28 August 2023

Matías Garafulic Schar (born 1 September 2000) is a professional rugby union player who plays as a centre for Super Rugby Americas club Selknam. He was born in Santiago to Chilean parents.

== International career ==
He was part of the Chilean team that qualified for their first Rugby World Cup in 2022, upsetting the odds against Canada and the United States, as Garafulic scored a try in the last game of the Americas qualification against the latter, an historic away win that sealed their qualification for the 2023 World Cup.
