= Andrei Mahu =

Romanian rugby union player (born 1991)

- Born: 3 September 1991 (age 35) Moldova
- Height: 2.05 m (6 ft 9 in)
- Weight: 110 kg (17 st 5 lb; 243 lb)

Rugby union career
- Position: Lock
- Current team: USA Perpignan
Senior career
Years	Team	Apps	(Points)
2012−2013	RCJ Farul Constanța	2	(0)
2013−2014	Timișoara Saracens	7	(0)
2014−2015	Zebre	6	(0)
2015−2016	Lyons Piacenza	5	(0)
2016−2017	Kuban		
2017−2020	Krasny Yar	6	(5)
2020–2021	London Irish	5	(0)
2021–2023	USA Perpignan	29	(0)
2023–	Massy		
- Correct as of 22 October 2020
International career
Years	Team	Apps	(Points)
2011−2017	Moldova	24	(5)
2023−	Romania		
- Correct as of 30 May 2020

Andrei Mahu (born 3 September 1991) is a Romanian rugby union player. His usual position is as a Lock and he currently plays for Massy in French Pro D2.

In 2014–15 Pro12 season he played for Zebre. In 2020-2021 season he played for London Irish. In October 2020 it was confirmed he would move to English Premiership Rugby side London Irish ahead of the 2020–21 season.

From 2011 to 2017 Mahu was named in the Moldova squad. Since 2023 he was selected for Romania squad.
