= Raimundo Martínez =

Chile international rugby union player

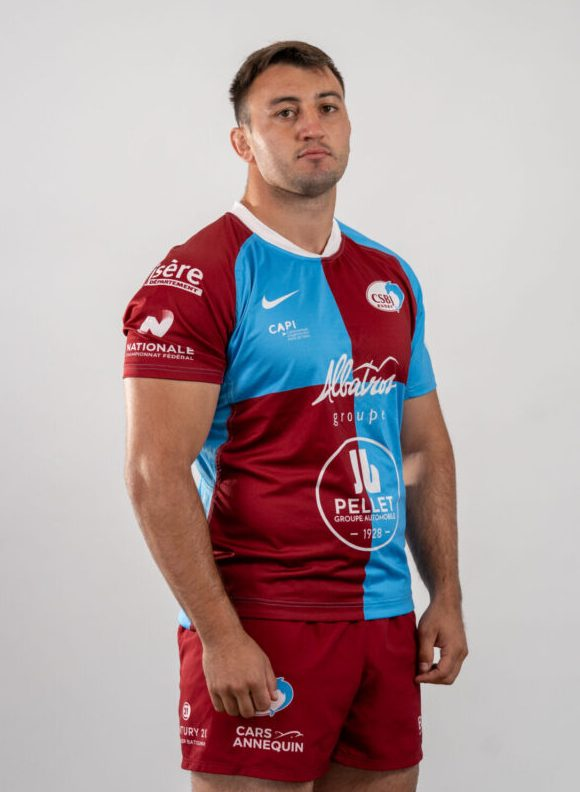
- Full name: Raimundo Martínez Amar
- Born: 25 November 1999 (age 26) Santiago, Chile
- Height: 1.81 m (5 ft 11 in)
- Weight: 103 kg (227 lb; 16 st 3 lb)
- School: The Grange School
- University: Pontifical Catholic University of Chile

Rugby union career
- Position(s): Number 8, Flanker, Hooker
- Current team: Selknam
Senior career
Years	Team	Apps	(Points)
2021–2025	Selknam	53+	(75+)
2026	Bourgoin-Jallieu	5	(15)
2026	Selknam	53+	(75+)
- Correct as of 30 June 2026
International career
Years	Team	Apps	(Points)
2019–	Chile	29	(30)
2020–2024	Chile XV	11	(0)
- Correct as of 30 June 2026

Raimundo Martínez Amar (born 25 November 1999) is a Chilean professional rugby union player who plays as a number eight, Flanker and Hooker for Super Rugby Americas club Selknam and the Chile national team.

== Club career ==
Martínez grew up in Santiago, where he played his rugby with the PWCC, before enjoying a spell in the CA Brive academy from 2019 to 2020 as a Hooker.

Back in Chile, he played with Selknam in the newly founded Súper Liga Americana de Rugby. He was part of the team that registered historical wins against the Argentinian Jaguares XV, eventually reaching the final of the competition.

He continued to play at Selknam for 2022, 2023, 2024 and 2025 seasons at the rebranded Super Rugby Americas competition, playing mainly as a backrower. In 2025, he had a stand up season being the tryman of the competition and qualifying to the semifinals.

On 1 February 2026, Martínez was announced as a signing for Championnat Fédéral Nationale club Bourgoin-Jallieu as a Joker Medical Hooker.

He returned to Chile in 2026 to finish the Super Rugby Americas with Selknam.

== International career ==
Raimundo Martínez is a Chile international since 2018, as Los Cóndores had some historical results in Test matches, beating the likes of recent world cup qualified Russia in 2021.

He was part of the team that qualified for their first Rugby World Cup in 2022, upsetting the odds against Canada and the United States, a serie of historic wins that sealed their qualification for the 2023 World Cup.

At the World Cup, he played all four games for Chile. In 2025, he once again was part of the team who qualified for Chile's second Rugby World Cup, this time upsetting Samoa.
