= Joel Lam =

New Zealand rugby union player

- Born: 17 May 2002 (age 24) Melbourne, Australia
- Height: 179 cm (5 ft 10 in)
- Weight: 84 kg (185 lb; 13 st 3 lb)
- School: St Andrews College
- Notable relative(s): Ben Lam (cousin); Jack Lam (cousin); Seilala Lam (cousin); Pat Lam (uncle); AJ Lam (cousin)

Rugby union career
- Position: Scrum-Half
- Current team: Samoa
Senior career
Years	Team	Apps	(Points)
2022	Canterbury	8	(0)
2023	Crusaders	1	(0)
2026	Moana Pasifika	3	(5)
- Correct as of August 2025
International career
Years	Team	Apps	(Points)
2021–2022	New Zealand U20	1	(5)
2024	Samoa	1	(5)

Joel Lam (born 17 May 2002) is a New Zealand and Samoan rugby union player, who has played for the Crusaders, playing domestically in New Zealand and made his first international debut for Manu Samoa during the 2025 Pacific Nations Cup, in a test match against Tonga in August 2025. His preferred position is scrum-half.

== Early career ==
Lam attended St Andrew's College, Christchurch and played his junior rugby for Burnside RFC. He was a member of the Crusaders U20 side, as well as the New Zealand U20 side.

== Professional career ==
Lam was named in the Canterbury side for the 2022 Bunnings NPC. He was called into the Crusaders squad during the 2023 Super Rugby Pacific season, being named in the side for Round 15 against the Hurricanes, where he was a late replacement.

== International career ==
In August 2025, Lam was named in the Manu Samoa squad for the Pacific Nations Cup opening match against Tonga. He made his international debut in the second half of the match, in scrum-half on 23 August 2025 at Teufaiva Stadium in Nuku’alofa. Samoa lost the game 30–16, with Lam coming off the bench.
