= 2024 end-of-year rugby union internationals =

International rugby union matches

The 2024 end-of-year rugby union internationals (also known as the autumn internationals in the Northern Hemisphere) were international rugby union matches that were played mostly in the Northern Hemisphere during the November 2024 international window.

== Fixtures ==
=== 26 October ===
26 October 2024
14:50 JST (UTC+09)

Japan	19–64	New Zealand
Try: Naikabula 4' c Makisi 17' m Helu 68' c Con: Tatekawa (1/2) 5'; Matsunaga (1/1) 69'	Report	Try: Tele'a 11' c Tuipulotu 14' c Proctor 20' m Cane 23' m Finau 30' m Tosi 33' c Williams 39' c Roigard 43' c Love (2) 77' c, 80' c Con: McKenzie (7/10) 12', 15', 34', 40', 43', 78', 80'+1

Nissan Stadium, Yokohama
Attendance: 65,000
Referee: Jordan Way (Australia)

Team details

FB	15	Yoshitaka Yazaki
RW	14	Jone Naikabula
OC	13	Dylan Riley
IC	12	Nicholas McCurran
LW	11	Malo Tuitama	(substituted off) 54'
FH	10	Harumichi Tatekawa (c)	(substituted off) 54'
SH	9	Shinobu Fujiwara	(substituted off) 70'
N8	8	Faulua Makisi		(substituted off) 51'
OF	7	Kazuki Himeno	(substituted off) 45'	(substituted on) 51'
BF	6	Amato Fakatava
RL	5	Warner Dearns
LL	4	Sanaila Waqa	(substituted off) 44'
TP	3	Shuhei Takeuchi	(substituted off) 44'
HK	2	Atsushi Sakate	(substituted off) 46'
LP	1	Takato Okabe	(substituted off) 62'
Substitutions:
HK	16	Mamoru Harada	(substituted on) 46'
PR	17	Takayoshi Mohara	(substituted on) 62'
PR	18	Opeti Helu	(substituted on) 44'
LK	19	Epineri Uluiviti	(substituted on) 44'
FL	20	Kanji Shimokawa	(substituted on) 45'
SH	21	Taiki Koyama	(substituted on) 70'
CE	22	Tomoki Osada	(substituted on) 54'
FB	23	Takurō Matsunaga	(substituted on) 54'
Coach:
(Australia) Eddie Jones

FB	15	Stephen Perofeta
RW	14	Sevu Reece	(substituted off) 58'
OC	13	Billy Proctor
IC	12	Anton Lienert-Brown	(substituted off) 58'
LW	11	Mark Tele'a
FH	10	Damian McKenzie
SH	9	Cam Roigard	(substituted off) 50'
N8	8	Wallace Sititi
OF	7	Sam Cane	(substituted off) 50'
BF	6	Samipeni Finau
RL	5	Patrick Tuipulotu (c)
LL	4	Sam Darry	(substituted off) 50'
TP	3	Pasilio Tosi	(substituted off) 50'
HK	2	Asafo Aumua	(substituted off) 50'
LP	1	Tamaiti Williams	(substituted off) 50'
Substitutions:
HK	16	George Bell	(substituted on) 50'
PR	17	Ofa Tu'ungafasi	(substituted on) 50'
PR	18	Fletcher Newell	(substituted on) 50'
LK	19	Josh Lord	(substituted on) 50'
FL	20	Peter Lakai	(substituted on) 50'
SH	21	TJ Perenara	(substituted on) 50'
CE	22	David Havili	(substituted on) 58'
FB	23	Ruben Love	(substituted on) 58'
Coach:
(New Zealand) Scott Robertson

Assistant referees:
Nic Berry (Australia)
Reuben Keane (Australia)
Television match official:
Damon Murphy (Australia)
Foul play review officer:
Brett Cronan (Australia)

Notes:

- Opeti Helu, Takurō Matsunaga (both Japan), Peter Lakai and Ruben Love (both New Zealand) made their international debuts.

=== 2 November ===
2 November 2024
15:10 GMT (UTC+0)

England	22–24	New Zealand
Try: Feyi-Waboso 43' c Con: Smith (1/1) 45'; Pen: Smith (5/5) 4', 12', 30', 36', 59'	Report	Try: Tele'a (2) 8' c, 75' c Jordan 27' c Con: B. Barrett (2/2) 9', 28'; McKenzie (1/1) 76'; Pen: McKenzie (1/1) 66'

Allianz Stadium, London
Attendance: 81,910
Referee: Angus Gardner (Australia)

Team details

FB	15	George Furbank
RW	14	Immanuel Feyi-Waboso
OC	13	Henry Slade
IC	12	Ollie Lawrence
LW	11	Tommy Freeman
FH	10	Marcus Smith	(substituted off) 62'
SH	9	Ben Spencer	(substituted off) 62'
N8	8	Ben Earl
OF	7	Tom Curry	(substituted off) 59'
BF	6	Chandler Cunningham-South	(substituted off) 65'
RL	5	George Martin	(substituted off) 77'
LL	4	Maro Itoje
TP	3	Will Stuart	(substituted off) 52'
HK	2	Jamie George (c)	(substituted off) 52'	(substituted on) 77'
LP	1	Ellis Genge	(substituted off) 52'
Substitutions:
HK	16	Theo Dan	(substituted on) 52'	(substituted off) 77'
PR	17	Fin Baxter	(substituted on) 52'
PR	18	Dan Cole	(substituted on) 52'
LK	19	Nick Isiekwe	(substituted on) 77'
FL	20	Ben Curry	(substituted on) 59'
N8	21	Alex Dombrandt	(substituted on) 65'
SH	22	Harry Randall	(substituted on) 62'
FH	23	George Ford	(substituted on) 62'
Coach:
(England) Steve Borthwick

FB	15	Will Jordan
RW	14	Mark Tele'a		(substituted off) 60'	(substituted on) 66'
OC	13	Rieko Ioane		(substituted off) 16'	(substituted on) 28'
IC	12	Jordie Barrett				(substituted off) 64'
LW	11	Caleb Clarke
FH	10	Beauden Barrett			(substituted off) 66'
SH	9	Cortez Ratima		(substituted off) 59'
N8	8	Ardie Savea
OF	7	Sam Cane		(substituted off) 76'
BF	6	Wallace Sititi
RL	5	Tupou Vaa'i		(substituted off) 40'
LL	4	Scott Barrett (c)
TP	3	Tyrel Lomax		(substituted off) 62'
HK	2	Codie Taylor		(substituted off) 5'
LP	1	Tamaiti Williams		(substituted off) 62'
Substitutions:
HK	16	Asafo Aumua		(substituted on) 5'
PR	17	Ofa Tu'ungafasi		(substituted on) 62'
PR	18	Pasilio Tosi		(substituted on) 62'
LK	19	Patrick Tuipulotu		(substituted on) 40'
FL	20	Samipeni Finau		(substituted on) 76'
SH	21	Cam Roigard		(substituted on) 59'
CE	22	Anton Lienert-Brown	(yellow card) 77'	(substituted on) 16'	(substituted off) 28'	(substituted on) 64'
FH	23	Damian McKenzie		(substituted on) 60'
Coach:
(New Zealand) Scott Robertson

Player of the Match:
Wallace Sititi (New Zealand)

Assistant referees:
Pierre Brousset (France)
Jordan Way (Australia)
Television match official:
Marius van der Westhuizen (South Africa)
Foul play review officer:
Marius Jonker (South Africa)

Notes:

- New Zealand retained the Hillary Shield.

2 November 2024
17:30 WET (UTC+0)

Munster (Ireland)	24–38	(New Zealand) All Blacks XV
Try: Haley 34' m Penalty try 40'; Hodnett 49' m Farrell 60' m Con: Butler (1/1) 61'	Report	Try: Lam 22' c Fihaki 28' c McAlister 44' c Tupaea 57' m Naholo 75' c Plummer 79' m Con: Plummer (4/6) 23', 29', 45', 76'

Thomond Park, Limerick
Attendance: 26,267
Referee: Takehito Namekawa (Japan)

Team details

FB	15	Mike Haley
RW	14	Shay McCarthy	(substituted off) 70'
OC	13	Tom Farrell
IC	12	Rory Scannell
LW	11	Diarmuid Kilgallen
FH	10	Billy Burns	(substituted off) 52'
SH	9	Ethan Coughlan	(substituted off) 55'
N8	8	Gavin Coombes
OF	7	John Hodnett
BF	6	Peter O'Mahony	(substituted off) 40'
RL	5	Thomas Ahern	(substituted off) 61'
LL	4	Fineen Wycherley
TP	3	Stephen Archer	(substituted off) 70'
HK	2	Diarmuid Barron (c)	(substituted off) 55'
LP	1	John Ryan	(substituted off) 51'
Substitutions:
HK	16	Niall Scannell	(substituted on) 55'
PR	17	Kieran Ryan	(substituted on) 51'
PR	18	Ronan Foxe	(substituted on) 70'
LK	19	Evan O'Connell	(substituted on) 61'
FL	20	Ruadhán Quinn	(substituted on) 40'
SH	21	Paddy Patterson	(substituted on) 55'
FH	22	Tony Butler	(substituted on) 52'
WG	23	Ben O'Connor	(substituted on) 70'
Coach:
(Ireland) Ian Costello

FB	15	Shaun Stevenson
RW	14	Chay Fihaki		(substituted off) 45'
OC	13	AJ Lam
IC	12	Quinn Tupaea
LW	11	Kini Naholo
FH	10	Harry Plummer
SH	9	Finlay Christie		(substituted off) 65'
N8	8	Devan Flanders		(substituted off) 61'
OF	7	Du'Plessis Kirifi (c)
BF	6	Oliver Haig
RL	5	Fabian Holland		(substituted off) 65'
LL	4	Isaia Walker-Leawere	(yellow card) 40'
TP	3	George Dyer		(substituted off) 50'
HK	2	Brodie McAlister		(substituted off) 58'
LP	1	George Bower		(substituted off) 50'
Substitutions:
HK	16	Bradley Slater		(substituted on) 58'
PR	17	Xavier Numia		(substituted on) 50'
PR	18	Marcel Renata		(substituted on) 50'
LK	19	Naitoa Ah Kuoi		(substituted on) 65'
FL	20	Corey Kellow		(substituted on) 61'
SH	21	Noah Hotham		(substituted on) 65'
FH	22	Josh Jacomb
FB	23	Ruben Love		(substituted on) 45'
Coach:
(New Zealand) Clayton McMillan

Assistant referees:
Matthew Carley (England)
Anthony Woodthorpe (England)
Television match official:
Damon Murphy (Australia)

2 November 2024
17:40 GMT (UTC+0)

Scotland	57–17	Fiji
Try: Rowe 9' c Graham (4) 14' c, 17' m, 52' c, 61' c Jones (2) 20' c, 78' c van der Merwe 71' c Con: Hastings (7/8) 9', 15', 21', 53', 62', 72', 79'; Pen: Hastings (1/1) 36'	Report	Try: Armstrong-Ravula 33' m Derenalagi 40+4' m Ikanivere 48' c Con: Armstrong-Ravula (1/1) 49'

Murrayfield Stadium, Edinburgh
Attendance: 67,144
Referee: Craig Evans (Wales)

Team details

FB	15	Kyle Rowe		(substituted off) 40+1'
RW	14	Darcy Graham		(substituted off) 65'
OC	13	Huw Jones
IC	12	Sione Tuipulotu (c)
LW	11	Duhan van der Merwe
FH	10	Adam Hastings
SH	9	Ali Price		(substituted off) 48'
N8	8	Jack Dempsey		(substituted off) 67'
OF	7	Rory Darge
BF	6	Matt Fagerson
RL	5	Scott Cummings		(substituted off) 59'
LL	4	Grant Gilchrist
TP	3	Zander Fagerson		(substituted off) 59'
HK	2	Ewan Ashman	(yellow card) 32'	(substituted off) 48'
LP	1	Pierre Schoeman		(substituted off) 48'
Substitutions:
HK	16	Dylan Richardson		(substituted on) 48'
PR	17	Rory Sutherland		(substituted on) 48'
PR	18	D'Arcy Rae		(substituted on) 59'
LK	19	Max Williamson		(substituted on) 59'
FL	20	Gregor Brown		(substituted on) 67'
SH	21	Jamie Dobie		(substituted on) 48'
FH	22	Tom Jordan		(substituted on) 40+1'
CE	23	Stafford McDowall		(substituted on) 65'
Coach:
(Scotland) Gregor Townsend

FB	15	Isaiah Armstrong-Ravula
RW	14	Vuate Karawalevu
OC	13	Apisalome Vota	(yellow card) 13'	(substituted off) 63'
IC	12	Inia Tabuavou		(substituted off) 59'
LW	11	Ponepati Loganimasi
FH	10	Caleb Muntz
SH	9	Frank Lomani	(yellow card) 3'	(substituted off) 63'
N8	8	Elia Canakaivata
OF	7	Kitione Salawa
BF	6	Meli Derenalagi		(substituted off) 67'
RL	5	Leone Rotuisolia		(substituted off) 50'
LL	4	Isoa Nasilasila
TP	3	Samu Tawake		(substituted off) 59'
HK	2	Tevita Ikanivere (c)		(substituted off) 59'
LP	1	Haereiti Hetet		(substituted off) 59'
Substitutions:
HK	16	Mesu Dolokoto		(substituted on) 59'
PR	17	Livai Natave		(substituted on) 59'
PR	18	Jone Koroiduadua		(substituted on) 59'
LK	19	Mesake Vocevoce		(substituted on) 50'
FL	20	Vilive Miramira		(substituted on) 67'
SH	21	Simione Kuruvoli		(substituted on) 63'
CE	22	Kemu Valetini		(substituted on) 59'
CE	23	Waqa Nalaga		(substituted on) 63'
Coach:
(Australia) Mick Byrne

Player of the Match:
Darcy Graham (Scotland)

Assistant referees:
Christophe Ridley (England)
Luc Ramos (France)
Television match official:
Brett Cronan (Australia)
Foul play review officer:
Quinton Immelman (South Africa)

Notes:

- Scotland earned their biggest winning margin over Fiji, surpassing their 37-point difference (54–17) set in 2018.
- Tom Jordan (Scotland), Waqa Nalaga and Kemu Valetini (both Fiji) made their international debuts.

2 November 2024
20:00 CET (UTC+1)

Belgium	48–7	Switzerland
	Report

Stade Charles Tondreau, Mons
Referee: Alex Frasson (Italy)

=== 5/6 November ===
5 November 2024
19:30 GST (UTC+4)

United Arab Emirates	22–62	Zimbabwe
Try: Davetwalu 45' m Ferguson 61' c Penalty try 77'; Con: Kennedy (1/1) 62'; Pen: Snetler (1/2) 33'	Report	Try: Penalty try 14'; Muzanargwo 20' c Mudariki (2) 30' c, 40' c Sigauke (3) 36' m, 66' c, 69' c Gurwe 65' m Mudzekenyedzi 71' c Con: Prior (6/8) 21', 31', 40', 67', 70', 72'; Pen: Prior (1/1) 2'

The Sevens Stadium, Dubai
Referee: Morgan White (Hong Kong China)

6 November 2024
19:45 GMT (UTC+0)

UK Armed Forces XV	26–43	Germany
	Report

Kingsholm Stadium, Gloucester
Referee: Michael Todd (Scotland)

=== 8/9/10 November ===
8 November 2024
19:45 GMT (UTC+0)

Bristol Bears (England)	10–10	Australia XV
Try: Janse van Rensburg 48' c Con: Worsley (1/1) 49'; Pen: Worsley (1/1) 36'	Report	Try: Anderson (2) 8' m, 80' m

Ashton Gate, Bristol
Attendance: 15,000
Referee: Craig Evans (Wales)

Team details

FB	15	(United States) Toby Fricker
RW	14	(Fiji) Ratu Naulago	(yellow card) 74'
OC	13	(Fiji) Kalaveti Ravouvou
IC	12	(South Africa) Benhard Janse van Rensburg
LW	11	(England) Gabriel Ibitoye		(substituted off) 70'
FH	10	(England) Sam Worsley
SH	9	(Ireland) Kieran Marmion		(substituted off) 40'
N8	8	(Argentina) Benjamín Grondona		(substituted off) 40'
OF	7	(England) Fitz Harding (c)
BF	6	(Australia) Jake Heenan
RL	5	(England) Joe Batley
LL	4	(England) Joe Owen
TP	3	(Zimbabwe) Lovejoy Chawatama		(substituted off) 48'
HK	2	(England) Harry Thacker		(substituted on) 70'
LP	1	(England) Jake Woolmore
Substitutions:
HK	16	(England) Gabriel Oghre		(substituted on) 40'
PR	17	(England) Max Lahiff		(substituted on) 48'
PR	18	(Wales) Sam Scott
LK	19	(England) Ethan Surrey
HK	20	(England) Tom Doughty		(substituted on) 70'
SH	21	(Wales) Oscar Lennon		(substituted on) 40'
CE	22	(England) Gethin O'Callaghan		(substituted on) 70'
CE	23	(England) Jacob Cusick
Coach:
(Samoa) Pat Lam

FB	15	Andy Muirhead
RW	14	Lachie Anderson
OC	13	Josh Flook
IC	12	Joey Walton	(yellow card) 24'	(substituted off) 54'
LW	11	Corey Toole
FH	10	Hamish Stewart		(substituted off) 66'
SH	9	Issak Fines-Leleiwasa		(substituted off) 54'
N8	8	John Bryant		(substituted off) 50'
OF	7	Rory Scott
BF	6	Tom Hooper
RL	5	Darcy Swain (c)
LL	4	Angus Blyth		(substituted off) 62'
TP	3	Rhys van Nek		(substituted off) 50'
HK	2	Lachlan Lonergan		(substituted off) 40'
LP	1	Tom Lambert		(substituted off) 40'
Substitutions:
HK	16	Tom Horton		(substituted on) 40'
PR	17	Harry Hoopert		(substituted on) 40'
PR	18	Tiaan Tauakipulu		(substituted on) 50'
LK	19	Ryan Smith		(substituted on) 62'
FL	20	Luke Reimer		(substituted on) 50'
SH	21	Ryan Lonergan		(substituted on) 54'
CE	22	Ollie Sapsford		(substituted on) 54'
FB	23	Jock Campbell		(substituted on) 66'
Coach:
(Australia) Rod Seib

Assistant referees:
Sara Cox (England)
George Selwood (England)

8 November 2024
20:10 WET (UTC+0)

Ireland	13–23	New Zealand
Try: van der Flier 42' c Con: Crowley (1/1) 43'; Pen: Crowley (2/2) 7', 39'	Report	Try: Jordan 68' m Pen: McKenzie (6/7) 9', 28', 37', 48', 61', 64'

Aviva Stadium, Dublin
Attendance: 51,700
Referee: Nic Berry (Australia)

Team details

FB	15	Hugo Keenan
RW	14	Mack Hansen
OC	13	Garry Ringrose	(substituted off) 69'
IC	12	Bundee Aki
LW	11	James Lowe
FH	10	Jack Crowley	(substituted off) 57'
SH	9	Jamison Gibson-Park	(substituted off) 73'
N8	8	Caelan Doris (c)
OF	7	Josh van der Flier
BF	6	Tadhg Beirne
RL	5	James Ryan	(substituted off) 69'
LL	4	Joe McCarthy	(substituted off) 57'
TP	3	Finlay Bealham	(substituted off) 57'	(substituted on) 59'
HK	2	Rónan Kelleher	(substituted off) 57'
LP	1	Andrew Porter	(substituted off) 73'
Substitutions:
HK	16	Rob Herring	(substituted on) 57'
PR	17	Cian Healy	(substituted on) 73'
PR	18	Tom O'Toole	(substituted on) 57'	(substituted off) 59'
LK	19	Iain Henderson	(substituted on) 57'
FL	20	Peter O'Mahony	(substituted on) 69'
SH	21	Conor Murray	(substituted on) 73'
FH	22	Ciarán Frawley	(substituted on) 57'
CE	23	Jamie Osborne	(substituted on) 69'
Coach:
(England) Andy Farrell

FB	15	Will Jordan
RW	14	Mark Tele'a
OC	13	Rieko Ioane
IC	12	Jordie Barrett	(yellow card) 39'
LW	11	Caleb Clarke		(substituted off) 70'
FH	10	Damian McKenzie
SH	9	Cortez Ratima		(substituted off) 50'
N8	8	Ardie Savea
OF	7	Sam Cane		(substituted off) 72'
BF	6	Wallace Sititi
RL	5	Tupou Vaa'i		(substituted off) 57'
LL	4	Scott Barrett (c)
TP	3	Tyrel Lomax		(substituted off) 59'
HK	2	Asafo Aumua		(substituted off) 79'
LP	1	Tamaiti Williams		(substituted off) 59'
Substitutions:
HK	16	George Bell		(substituted on) 79'
PR	17	Ofa Tu'ungafasi		(substituted on) 59'
PR	18	Pasilio Tosi		(substituted on) 59'
LK	19	Patrick Tuipulotu		(substituted on) 57'
FL	20	Samipeni Finau		(substituted on) 72'
SH	21	Cam Roigard		(substituted on) 50'
CE	22	Anton Lienert-Brown		(substituted on) 70'
FB	23	Stephen Perofeta
Coach:
(New Zealand) Scott Robertson

Player of the Match:
Damian McKenzie (New Zealand)

Assistant referees:
Karl Dickson (England)
Andrea Piardi (Italy)
Television match official:
Brett Cronan (Australia)
Foul play review officer:
Ben Whitehouse (Wales)

9 November 2024
16:00 HKT (UTC+8)

Hong Kong	10–23	Brazil
Try: Worley 29' c Con: De Thierry (1/1) 29'; Pen: De Thierry (1/1) 4'	Report	Try: Ferreira 37' m Pen: Tranquez (6/6) 8', 13', 27', 33', 42', 63'

HKFC Ground, Happy Valley
Referee: Reuben Keane (Australia)

Team details

FB	15	Matteo Avitabile
RW	14	Charlie Higson-Smith	(substituted off) 73'
OC	13	Maxwell Threlkeld
IC	12	Benjamin Axten-Burrett
LW	11	Matt Worley
FH	10	Nathan De Thierry
SH	9	Jamie Lauder	(substituted off) 50'
N8	8	Luke van der Smit	(substituted off) 63'
OF	7	Pierce MacKinlay-West	(substituted off) 68'
BF	6	Joshua Hrstich (c)
RL	5	Patrick Jenkinson
LL	4	Mark Prior	(substituted off) 58'
TP	3	Faizal Solomona-Penesa	(substituted off) 40'
HK	2	Calum Scott	(substituted off) 40'
LP	1	Rory Cinnamond	(substituted off) 52'
Replacements:
HK	16	Jude Harding	(substituted on) 40'
PR	17	Sunia Fameitau	(substituted on) 52'
PR	18	Zacceus Cinnamond	(substituted on) 40'
LK	19	Kyle Sullivan	(substituted on) 58'
FL	20	Hugh McCormick-Houston	(substituted on) 68'
SH	21	Jack Combes	(substituted on) 50'
CE	22	Guy Spanton	(substituted on) 73'
FL	23	Tyler McNutt	(substituted on) 63'
Coach:
(New Zealand) Andrew Douglas

FB	15	Lucas Tranquez
RW	14	Robert Tenório
OC	13	Lorenzo Massari
IC	12	Moisés Duque	(substituted off) 56'
LW	11	Daniel Lima
FH	10	João Amaral
SH	9	Lucas Spago	(substituted off) 50'
N8	8	Cléber Dias (c)
BF	7	Matheus Cláudio	(substituted off) 57'
OF	6	Matteo Dell'Acqua	(substituted off) 40'
RL	5	Gabriel Oliveira	(substituted off) 63'
LL	4	Ben Donald
TP	3	Matheus Rocha	(substituted off) 63'
HK	2	Henrique Ferreira	(substituted off) 52'
LP	1	Wilton Rebolo	(substituted off) 63'
Replacements:
HK	16	Endy Willian	(substituted on) 52'
PR	17	Caíque Silva	(substituted on) 63'
PR	18	Leonel Moreno	(substituted on) 63'
LK	19	Gabriel Paganini	(substituted on) 63'
FL	20	Adrio de Melo	(substituted on) 40'
FL	21	Rafael Teixeira	(substituted on) 57'
SH	22	Felipe Gonçalves	(substituted on) 50'
CE	23	Victor Silva	(substituted on) 56'
Coach:
(Uruguay) Emiliano Caffera

Assistant referees:
Katsuki Furuse (Japan)
Morgan White (Hong Kong China)

Notes:

- Sunia Fameitau and Maxwell Threlkeld (both Hong Kong) made their international debuts.

9 November 2024
13:00 EET (UTC+2)

Canada	14–44	Chile
Try: Rumball 77' m Pen: Nelson (3/3) 5', 10', 40'	Report	Try: Game 1' m Martínez 12' c M. Garafulic 26' c B. Videla 50' c D. Saavedra 50' m N. Garafulic (2) 54' m, 57' m Con: S. Videla (3/7) 13', 27', 43'; Pen: S. Videla (1/1) 66'

Stadionul Arcul de Triumf, Bucharest
Referee: Angus Mabey (New Zealand)

Team details

FB	15	Nic Benn
RW	14	Andrew Coe		(substituted off) 61'
OC	13	Ben LeSage		(substituted off) 45'
IC	12	Noah Flesch
LW	11	Josiah Morra
FH	10	Peter Nelson
SH	9	Jason Higgins		(substituted off) 63'
N8	8	Lucas Rumball (c)
OF	7	Matt Heaton
BF	6	Ethan Fryer		(substituted off) 2'
RL	5	Mason Flesch
LL	4	Kaden Duguid		(substituted off) 61'
TP	3	Conor Young
HK	2	Andrew Quattrin	(yellow card) 69'
LP	1	Cole Keith		(substituted off) 40'
Replacements:
HK	16	Jesse Mackail			(substituted on) 73'
PR	17	Calixto Martinez		(substituted on) 40'
PR	18	Tyler Matcham
LK	19	Callum Botchar		(substituted on) 61'
FL	20	Siôn Parry		(substituted on) 2'	(substituted off) 73'
SH	21	Brock Gallagher		(substituted on) 63'
FB	22	Cooper Coats		(substituted on) 61'
CE	23	Mitch Richardson		(substituted on) 45'
Coach:
(Wales) Kingsley Jones

FB	15	Iñaki Ayarza
RW	14	Cristóbal Game	(substituted off) 10'
OC	13	Domingo Saavedra
IC	12	Santiago Videla	(substituted off) 66'
LW	11	Nicolás Garafulic
FH	10	Rodrigo Fernández
SH	9	Benjamín Videla	(substituted off) 69'
N8	8	Alfonso Escobar	(substituted off) 40'
OF	7	Raimundo Martínez
BF	6	Martín Sigren (c)
RL	5	Clemente Saavedra	(substituted off) 62'
LL	4	Santiago Pedrero
TP	3	Iñaki Gurruchaga	(substituted off) 55'
HK	2	Augusto Böhme	(substituted off) 55'
LP	1	Javier Carrasco	(substituted off) 62'
Replacements:
HK	16	Diego Escobar	(substituted on) 55'
PR	17	Norman Aguayo	(substituted on) 62'
PR	18	Matías Dittus	(substituted on) 55'
LK	19	Bruno Sáez	(substituted on) 62'
FL	20	Ernesto Tchimino	(substituted on) 40'
SH	21	Marcelo Torrealba	(substituted on) 69'
FH	22	Juan Cruz Reyes	(substituted on) 66'
CE	23	Matías Garafulic	(substituted on) 10'
Coach:
(Uruguay) Pablo Lemoine

Assistant referees:
Morné Ferreira (South Africa)
Federico Vedovelli (Italy)
Television match official:
Matteo Liperini (Italy)

Notes:

- Chile recorded their largest ever winning margin over Canada, and won back-to-back matches against them for the first time.
- Noah Flesch (Canada) and Norman Aguayo (Chile) made their international debuts.

9 November 2024
12:45 CET (UTC+1)

Spain	33–24	Uruguay
Try: Minguillon 2' m Cian 18' m Aurrekoetxea (2) 27' c, 38' c Con: Vinuesa (2/4) 28', 39'; Pen: Vinuesa (3/3) 54', 63', 77'	Report	Try: Penalty try 40'; Pujadas 42' c Aliaga 59' c Con: Álvarez (2/2) 42', 60'; Pen: Álvarez (1/1) 77'

Estadio Nacional Complutense, Madrid
Referee: Eoghan Cross (Ireland)

Team details

FB	15	Alberto Carmona		(substituted off) 77'
RW	14	Gauthier Minguillón		(substituted off) 42'	(substituted on) 50'
OC	13	Iñaki Mateu		(substituted off) 69'
IC	12	Álvar Gimeno
LW	11	Martiniano Cian
FH	10	Gonzalo Vinuesa
SH	9	Kerman Aurrekoetxea		(substituted off) 60'
N8	8	Raphaël Nieto
OF	7	Ekain Imaz
BF	6	Vicente Boronat		(substituted off) 59'
RL	5	Asier Usárraga		(substituted off) 76'
LL	4	Ignacio Piñeiro
TP	3	Jon Zabala (c)		(substituted off) 65'
HK	2	Santiago Ovejero	(yellow card) 40'			(substituted off) 59'
LP	1	Bernardo Vázquez		(substituted off) 54'
Replacements:
HK	16	Álvaro García		(substituted on) 42'	(substituted off) 50'	(substituted on) 59'
PR	17	Thierry Futeu		(substituted on) 54'
PR	18	Lucas Santamaría		(substituted on) 65'
LK	19	Pablo Guirao		(substituted on) 76'
FL	20	Alex Saleta		(substituted on) 59'
SH	21	Estanislao Bay		(substituted on) 60'
CE	22	Alex Alonso		(substituted on) 69'
CE	23	Pau Aira		(substituted on) 77'
Coach:
(Argentina) Pablo Bouza

FB	15	Baltazar Amaya	(substituted off) 28'
RW	14	Mateo Viñals	(substituted off) 47'
OC	13	Felipe Arcos Pérez
IC	12	Juan Manuel Alonso	(substituted off) 75'
LW	11	Bautista Basso
FH	10	Ignacio Álvarez
SH	9	Santiago Álvarez
N8	8	Carlos Deus	(substituted off) 50'
OF	7	Lucas Bianchi
BF	6	Santiago Civetta
RL	5	Manuel Leindekar (c)
LL	4	Felipe Aliaga	(substituted off) 73'
TP	3	Ignacio Péculo	(substituted off) 62'
HK	2	Guillermo Pujadas	(substituted off) 64'
LP	1	Mateo Sanguinetti	(substituted off) 55'
Replacements:
HK	16	Joaquín Myszka	(substituted on) 62'
PR	17	Diego Arbelo	(substituted on) 62'
PR	18	Mateo Perillo	(substituted on) 55'
LK	19	Ignacio Dotti	(substituted on) 73'
FL	20	Manuel Diana	(substituted on) 50'
CE	21	Joaquín Suárez	(substituted on) 47'
FH	22	Ícaro Amarillo	(substituted on) 75'
WG	23	Juan González	(substituted on) 28'
Coach:
(Argentina) Rodolfo Ambrosio

Assistant referees:
Chris Busby (Ireland)
Peter Martin (Ireland)
Television match official:
Quinton Immelman (South Africa)

Notes:

- Pablo Guirao (Spain), Ícaro Amarillo and Juan González (both Uruguay) made their international debuts.

9 November 2024
16:00 EAT (UTC+03)

Kenya	27–25	Uganda

RFUEA Ground, Nairobi
Referee: Tinashe Kamwenje (Zimbabwe)

9 November 2024
15:10 GMT (UTC+0)

England	37–42	Australia
Try: Cunningham-South (2) 4' m, 11' c Sleightholme (2) 56' m, 67' c Itoje 77' c Con: Smith (3/5) 12', 68', 78'; Pen: Smith (2/2) 19', 30'	Report	Try: Wright 26' c Wilson 33' c Williams 49' m Kellaway 74' c Jorgensen 80+3' c Con: Lolesio (2/3) 27', 34'; Donaldson (2/2) 75', 80+4'; Pen: Lolesio (3/3) 9', 40+1', 52'

Allianz Stadium, London
Attendance: 81,329
Referee: Ben O'Keeffe (New Zealand)

Team details

FB	15	George Furbank	(substituted off) 61'
RW	14	Immanuel Feyi-Waboso	(substituted off) 20'	(substituted on) 30'			(substituted off) 50'
OC	13	Ollie Lawrence			(substituted off) 34'	(substituted on) 40'
IC	12	Henry Slade
LW	11	Tommy Freeman
FH	10	Marcus Smith
SH	9	Ben Spencer	(substituted off) 61'
N8	8	Ben Earl
OF	7	Tom Curry	(substituted off) 22'
BF	6	Chandler Cunningham-South
RL	5	George Martin	(substituted off) 59'
LL	4	Maro Itoje
TP	3	Will Stuart	(substituted off) 68'
HK	2	Jamie George (c)	(substituted off) 50'
LP	1	Ellis Genge	(substituted off) 61'
Substitutions:
HK	16	Luke Cowan-Dickie	(substituted on) 50'
PR	17	Fin Baxter	(substituted on) 61'
PR	18	Dan Cole	(substituted on) 68'
LK	19	Nick Isiekwe	(substituted on) 59'
N8	20	Alex Dombrandt	(substituted on) 22'
SH	21	Harry Randall	(substituted on) 61'
FH	22	George Ford	(substituted on) 61'
WG	23	Ollie Sleightholme	(substituted on) 20'	(substituted off) 30'	(substituted on) 34'	(substituted off) 40'	(substituted on) 50'
Coach:
(England) Steve Borthwick

FB	15	Tom Wright
RW	14	Andrew Kellaway
OC	13	Joseph Sua'ali'i
IC	12	Len Ikitau
LW	11	Dylan Pietsch	(substituted off) 47'
FH	10	Noah Lolesio	(substituted off) 70'
SH	9	Jake Gordon	(substituted off) 32'	(substituted on) 40'	(substituted off) 63'
N8	8	Harry Wilson (c)	(substituted off) 64'
OF	7	Fraser McReight
BF	6	Rob Valetini
RL	5	Jeremy Williams	(substituted off) 59'
LL	4	Nick Frost
TP	3	Taniela Tupou	(substituted off) 45'
HK	2	Matt Faessler	(substituted off) 59'
LP	1	Angus Bell	(substituted off) 70'
Replacements:
HK	16	Brandon Paenga-Amosa	(substituted on) 59'
PR	17	James Slipper	(substituted on) 70'
PR	18	Allan Alaalatoa	(substituted on) 45'
LK	19	Lukhan Salakaia-Loto	(substituted on) 59'
FL	20	Langi Gleeson	(substituted on) 64'
SH	21	Tate McDermott	(substituted on) 32'	(substituted off) 40'	(substituted on) 63'
FH	22	Ben Donaldson	(substituted on) 70'
WG	23	Max Jorgensen	(substituted on) 47'
Coach:
(New Zealand) Joe Schmidt

Player of the Match:
Joseph Sua'ali'i (Australia)

Assistant referees:
Nika Amashukeli (Georgia)
Paul Williams (New Zealand)
Television match official:
Glenn Newman (New Zealand)
Foul play review officer:
Marius van der Westhuizen (South Africa)

Notes:

- Australia won at Twickenham Stadium for the first time since the 2015 Rugby World Cup, and claimed the Ella–Mobbs Trophy for the first time since 2012.
- Joseph Sua'ali'i (Australia) made his international debut.

9 November 2024
18:00 EET (UTC+2)

Romania	25–15	Tonga
Try: Boboc 27' m Vaovasa 51' m Pen: Conache (4/4) 9', 45', 60', 69'; Rupanu (1/1) 77'	Report	Try: Tapueluelu 5' m Filimone 14' c Con: Pellegrini (1/2) 15'; Pen: Pellegrini (1/1) 42'

Stadionul Arcul de Triumf, Bucharest
Referee: Gianluca Gnecchi (Italy)

Team details

FB	15	Marius Simionescu (c)	(yellow card) 15'	(substituted off) 27'
RW	14	Corrado Stetco	(yellow card) 12'	(substituted off) 72'
OC	13	Mihai Graure
IC	12	Jason Tomane
LW	11	Tevita Manumua
FH	10	Hinckley Vaovasa
SH	9	Alin Conache		(substituted off) 75'
N8	8	Cristi Boboc
OF	7	Cristi Chirică
BF	6	Florian Roșu		(substituted off) 65'
RL	5	Ștefan Iancu		(substituted off) 78'
LL	4	Nicolaas Immelman
TP	3	Vasile Balan		(substituted off) 41'
HK	2	Tudor Butnariu		(substituted off) 68'
LP	1	Alexandru Savin		(substituted off) 44'	(substituted on) 52'	(substituted off) 65'
Replacements:
HK	16	Florin Bărdașu		(substituted on) 68'
PR	17	Iulian Harțig		(substituted on) 44'	(substituted off) 52'	(substituted on) 65'
PR	18	Cosmin Manole		(substituted on) 41'
LK	19	Virgil Ghenea		(substituted on) 78'
N8	20	Kamil Sobota	(yellow card) 69'	(substituted on) 65'
SH	21	Gabriel Rupanu		(substituted on) 75'
FH	22	Daniel Plai		(substituted on) 27'
WG	23	Fonovai Tangimana		(substituted on) 72'
Coach:
(France) David Gérard

FB	15	William Havili
RW	14	Taniela Filimone		(substituted off) 72'
OC	13	Fine Inisi
IC	12	Fetuli Paea
LW	11	John Tapueluelu
FH	10	Patrick Pellegrini
SH	9	Aisea Halo		(substituted off) 63'
N8	8	Lotu Inisi
OF	7	Sione Havili Talitui (c)
BF	6	Tupou Ma'afu-Afungia		(substituted off) 18'	(substituted on) 27'	(substituted off) 65'
RL	5	Harison Mataele	(yellow card) 65'	(substituted off) 78'
LL	4	Kelemete Finau-Fetuli		(substituted off) 40'
TP	3	Tau Koloamatangi		(substituted off) 68'
HK	2	Sam Moli		(substituted off) 72'
LP	1	Jethro Felemi		(substituted off) 60'
Replacements:
HK	16	Sekope Lopeti-Moli		(substituted on) 72'
PR	17	Duane Aholelei		(substituted on) 68'
PR	18	Paula Latu		(substituted on) 60'
FL	19	Tevita Ahokovi		(substituted on) 18'	(substituted off) 27'	(substituted on) 65'
LK	20	Justin Mataele		(substituted on) 78'
LK	21	Semisi Paea		(substituted on) 40'
SH	22	Siaosi Nginingini		(substituted on) 63'
WG	23	Tima Fainga'anuku		(substituted on) 72'
Coach:
(Tonga) Tevita Tu'ifua

Assistant referees:
Morné Ferreira (South Africa)
Federico Vedovelli (Italy)
Television match official:
Matteo Liperini (Italy)

Notes:

- Virgil Ghenea, Florian Roșu (both Romania), Duane Aholelei, Justin Mataele and Siaosi Nginingini (all Tonga) made their international debuts.

9 November 2024
16:00 WET (UTC+0)

Portugal	17–21	United States
Try: Storti 26' c Lima 62' c Con: Aubry (2/2) 27', 63'; Pen: Aubry (1/1) 12'	Report	Try: Ryan 16' c Augspurger 34' c Pifeleti 77' c Con: MacGinty (3/3) 17', 35', 78'

Estádio Cidade de Coimbra, Coimbra
Referee: Sam Grove-White (Scotland)

Team details

FB	15	Simão Bento
RW	14	Raffaele Storti
OC	13	José Lima
IC	12	Tomás Appleton (c)
LW	11	José Paiva dos Santos	(substituted off) 63'
FH	10	Hugo Aubry
SH	9	Hugo Camacho	(substituted off) 57'
N8	8	João Granate	(substituted off) 69'
OF	7	Nicolas Martins
BF	6	José Madeira
RL	5	António Rebelo de Andrade
LL	4	Steevy Cerqueira	(substituted off) 65'
TP	3	Cody Thomas	(substituted off) 56'
HK	2	Luka Begic	(substituted off) 59'
LP	1	David Costa	(substituted off) 65'
Replacements:
PR	16	António Machado Santos	(substituted on) 65'
HK	17	Santiago Lopes	(substituted on) 59'
PR	18	Diogo Ferreira	(substituted on) 56'
LK	19	José Rebelo de Andrade	(substituted on) 65'
FL	20	Diego Pinheiro	(substituted on) 69'
SH	21	António Campos	(substituted on) 57'
FH	22	Manuel Vareiro	(substituted on) 63'
CE	23	Gabriel Aviragnet
Coach:
(New Zealand) Simon Mannix

FB	15	Mitch Wilson
RW	14	Conner Mooneyham
OC	13	Dominic Besag
IC	12	Tavite Lopeti	(substituted off) 71'
LW	11	Nate Augspurger
FH	10	AJ MacGinty
SH	9	Ruben de Haas
N8	8	Paddy Ryan
OF	7	Cory Daniel	(substituted off) 71'
BF	6	Vili Helu	(substituted off) 71'
RL	5	Greg Peterson (c)
LL	4	Jason Damm
TP	3	Alex Maughan	(substituted off) 53'
HK	2	Shilo Klein	(substituted off) 57'
LP	1	Jack Iscaro	(substituted off) 63'
Replacements:
HK	16	Kapeli Pifeleti	(substituted on) 57'
PR	17	Jake Turnbull	(substituted on) 63'
PR	18	Pono Davis	(substituted on) 53'
LK	19	Tomás Casares	(substituted on) 71'
FL	20	Moni Tonga'uiha	(substituted on) 71'
SH	21	Ethan McVeigh
FB	22	Erich Storti	(substituted on) 71'
FH	23	Luke Carty
Coach:
(United States) Scott Lawrence

Assistant referees:
Takehito Namekawa (Japan)
Ruairidh Campbell (Scotland)
Television match official:
Andrew Jackson (England)

Notes:

- António Campos, Santiago Lopes (both Portugal), Tomás Casares, Shilo Klein and Erich Storti (all United States) made their international debuts.

9 November 2024
18:40 CET (UTC+1)

Italy	18–50	Argentina
Try: Penalty try 32'; Nicotera 68' m Pen: Allan (2/2) 40+3', 42'	Report	Try: Mallía 10' c Bertranou 28' c Sclavi 48' c Albornoz 56' c Cordero 65' m Alemanno 72' c Delguy 77' c Con: Albornoz (6/7) 11', 29', 49', 57', 73', 78'; Pen: Albornoz (1/1) 3'

Stadio Friuli, Udine
Attendance: 22,358
Referee: Matthew Carley (England)

Team details

FB	15	Ange Capuozzo		(substituted off) 6'
RW	14	Louis Lynagh
OC	13	Ignacio Brex		(substituted off) 69'
IC	12	Tommaso Menoncello
LW	11	Monty Ioane
FH	10	Paolo Garbisi
SH	9	Martin Page-Relo		(substituted off) 63'
N8	8	Lorenzo Cannone	(yellow card) 75'
OF	7	Michele Lamaro (c)
BF	6	Sebastian Negri		(substituted off) 58'
RL	5	Federico Ruzza		(substituted off) 44'
LL	4	Niccolò Cannone
TP	3	Marco Riccioni		(substituted off) 45'
HK	2	Gianmarco Lucchesi		(substituted off) 49'
LP	1	Mirco Spagnolo		(substituted off) 49'
Replacements:
HK	16	Giacomo Nicotera		(substituted on) 49'
PR	17	Danilo Fischetti		(substituted on) 49'
PR	18	Simone Ferrari		(substituted on) 45'
LK	19	Dino Lamb		(substituted on) 44'
FL	20	Manuel Zuliani		(substituted on) 58'
SH	21	Alessandro Garbisi		(substituted on) 63'
FH	22	Tommaso Allan		(substituted on) 6'
CE	23	Marco Zanon		(substituted on) 63'
Coach:
(Argentina) Gonzalo Quesada

FB	15	Juan Cruz Mallía
RW	14	Rodrigo Isgró		(substituted off) 62'
OC	13	Lucio Cinti
IC	12	Matías Orlando		(substituted off) 44'
LW	11	Bautista Delguy
FH	10	Tomás Albornoz
SH	9	Gonzalo Bertranou		(substituted off) 50'
N8	8	Joaquín Oviedo
OF	7	Santiago Grondona		(substituted off) 62'
BF	6	Juan Martín González	(yellow card) 32'
RL	5	Pedro Rubiolo
LL	4	Franco Molina		(substituted off) 58'
TP	3	Joel Sclavi		(substituted off) 50'
HK	2	Julián Montoya (c)		(substituted off) 58'
LP	1	Thomas Gallo		(substituted off) 66'
Substitutions:
HK	16	Ignacio Ruiz		(substituted on) 58'
PR	17	Ignacio Calles		(substituted on) 66'
PR	18	Francisco Gómez Kodela		(substituted on) 50'
LK	19	Matías Alemanno		(substituted on) 58'
FL	20	Juan Bautista Pedemonte		(substituted on) 62'
SH	21	Gonzalo García		(substituted on) 50'
CE	22	Matías Moroni		(substituted on) 44'
WG	23	Santiago Cordero		(substituted on) 62'
Coach:
(Argentina) Felipe Contepomi

Player of the Match:
Tomás Albornoz (Argentina)

Assistant referees:
Andrew Brace (Ireland)
Adam Leal (England)
Television match official:
Mike Adamson (Scotland)
Foul play review officer:
Marius Jonker (South Africa)

9 November 2024
21:10 CET (UTC+1)

France	52–12	Japan
Try: Biarrey (2) 3' m, 27' c Gailleton 9' c Roumat 18' c Mauvaka 33' m Gros 41' c Boudehent (2) 53' c, 64' c Con: Ramos (6/8) 10', 19', 28', 42', 54', 65'	Report	Try: Tatekawa 49' c Tatafu 60' m Con: Saitō (1/1) 50'

Stade de France, Saint-Denis
Attendance: 50,000
Referee: Damian Schneider (Argentina)

Team details

FB	15	Léo Barré	(substituted off) 50'
RW	14	Théo Attissogbé
OC	13	Émilien Gailleton	(substituted off) 55'
IC	12	Yoram Moefana
LW	11	Louis Bielle-Biarrey
FH	10	Thomas Ramos
SH	9	Antoine Dupont (c)	(substituted off) 65'
N8	8	Grégory Alldritt
OF	7	Alexandre Roumat
BF	6	François Cros	(substituted off) 40'
RL	5	Emmanuel Meafou	(substituted off) 50'
LL	4	Thibaud Flament	(substituted off) 32'
TP	3	Tevita Tatafu	(substituted off) 50'
HK	2	Peato Mauvaka
LP	1	Jean-Baptiste Gros	(substituted off) 51'
Substitutions:
HK	16	Julien Marchand	(substituted on) 50'
PR	17	Reda Wardi	(substituted on) 51'
PR	18	Georges-Henri Colombe	(substituted on) 50'
FL	19	Mickaël Guillard	(substituted on) 40'
FL	20	Paul Boudehent	(substituted on) 32'
SH	21	Maxime Lucu	(substituted on) 65'
FH	22	Matthieu Jalibert	(substituted on) 50'
CE	23	Gaël Fickou	(substituted on) 55'
Coach:
(France) Fabien Galthié

FB	15	Malo Tuitama
RW	14	Jone Naikabula
OC	13	Dylan Riley
IC	12	Siosaia Fifita	(substituted off) 66'
LW	11	Tomoki Osada
FH	10	Harumichi Tatekawa (c)	(substituted off) 50'
SH	9	Naoto Saitō	(substituted off) 50'
N8	8	Faulua Makisi	(substituted off) 48'
OF	7	Kazuki Himeno
BF	6	Kanji Shimokawa
RL	5	Warner Dearns	(substituted off) 53'	(substituted on) 63'
LL	4	Epineri Uluiviti
TP	3	Shuhei Takeuchi	(substituted off) 56'
HK	2	Mamoru Harada	(substituted off) 72'
LP	1	Takato Okabe	(substituted off) 51'
Substitutions:
HK	16	Kenta Matsuoka	(substituted on) 72'
PR	17	Yukio Morikawa	(substituted on) 51'
PR	18	Keijiro Tamefusa	(substituted on) 56'
N8	19	Amato Fakatava	(substituted on) 48'
FL	20	Tevita Tatafu	(substituted on) 53'	(substituted off) 63'
SH	21	Shinobu Fujiwara	(substituted on) 50'
CE	22	Yusuke Kajimura	(substituted on) 66'
FB	23	Takurō Matsunaga	(substituted on) 50'
Coach:
(Australia) Eddie Jones

Player of the Match:
Thomas Ramos (France)

Assistant referees:
Angus Gardner (Australia)
James Doleman (New Zealand)
Television match official:
Richard Kelly (New Zealand)
Foul play review officer:
Damon Murphy (Australia)

Notes:

- Grégory Alldritt (France) earned his 50th test cap.
- Tevita Tatafu (France) made his international debut.
- Damian Penaud (France) was originally named to start at right wing, but withdrew the day of the match due to illness. He was replaced in the starting line-up by Théo Attissogbé.

10 November 2024
14:00 CET (UTC+1)

Georgia	13–31	All Blacks XV
Try: Karkadze 8' c Con: Matkava (1/1) 8'; Pen: Matkava (2/2) 28', 40+2'	Report	Try: Eklund (2) 14' c, 42' m McLeod 24' m Christie 33' c Slater 67' c Con: Jacomb (3/5) 15', 34', 68'

GGL Stadium, Montpellier, France
Referee: Jordan Way (Australia)

Team details

FB	15	Davit Niniashvili
RW	14	Aka Tabutsadze
OC	13	Giorgi Kveseladze
IC	12	Tornike Kakhoidze		(substituted off) 63'
LW	11	Alexander Todua
FH	10	Luka Matkava		(substituted off) 69'
SH	9	Vasil Lobzhanidze (c)	(yellow card) 31'	(substituted off) 63'
N8	8	Tornike Jalaghonia
OF	7	Giorgi Tsutskiridze		(substituted off) 50'
BF	6	Ilia Spanderashvili
RL	5	Mikheil Babunashvili
LL	4	Giorgi Javakhia		(substituted off) 53'
TP	3	Alexsandre Kuntelia		(substituted off) 45'
HK	2	Vano Karkadze		(substituted off) 60'
LP	1	Nika Abuladze		(substituted off) 45'
Substitutions:
HK	16	Luka Nioradze		(substituted on) 60'
PR	17	Giorgi Akhaladze		(substituted on) 45'
PR	18	Irakli Aptsiauri		(substituted on) 45'
LK	19	Lasha Jaiani		(substituted on) 53'
FL	20	Luka Ivanishvili		(substituted on) 50'
SH	21	Tengiz Peranidze		(substituted on) 63'
FH	22	Tedo Abzhandadze		(substituted on) 69'
CE	23	Demur Tapladze		(substituted on) 63'
Coach:
(England) Richard Cockerill

FB	15	Shaun Stevenson
RW	14	Quinn Tupaea	(substituted off) 62'
OC	13	Dallas McLeod
IC	12	Riley Higgins
LW	11	Kini Naholo
FH	10	Josh Jacomb
SH	9	Finlay Christie	(substituted off) 50'
N8	8	Simon Parker
OF	7	Du'Plessis Kirifi (c)	(substituted off) 66'
BF	6	Caleb Delany	(substituted off) 56'
RL	5	Naitoa Ah Kuoi
LL	4	Isaia Walker-Leawere	(substituted off) 50'
TP	3	Marcel Renata	(substituted off) 61'
HK	2	Kurt Eklund	(substituted off) 61'
LP	1	George Bower	(substituted off) 50'
Substitutions:
HK	16	Bradley Slater	(substituted on) 61'
PR	17	Xavier Numia	(substituted on) 50'
PR	18	Saula Ma'u	(substituted on) 61'
LK	19	Fabian Holland	(substituted on) 50'
FL	20	Corey Kellow	(substituted on) 66'
FL	21	Devan Flanders	(substituted on) 56'
SH	22	Noah Hotham	(substituted on) 50'
FB	23	Chay Fihaki	(substituted on) 62'
Coach:
(New Zealand) Clayton McMillan

Assistant referees:
Jeremy Rozier (France)
Aimee Barrett-Theron (South Africa)
Television match official:
Brian MacNeice (Ireland)

10 November 2024
13:40 GMT (UTC+0)

Wales	19–24	Fiji
Try: Murray 8' c Penalty try 19'; Bevan 66' m Con: Anscombe (1/1) 9'	Report	Try: Muntz 24' c Tuisova 60' m Con: Muntz (1/2) 25'; Pen: Muntz (4/4) 12', 43', 49', 75'

Principality Stadium, Cardiff
Attendance: 61,587
Referee: Luc Ramos (France)

Team details

FB	15	Cameron Winnett
RW	14	Mason Grady		(substituted off) 18'
OC	13	Max Llewellyn
IC	12	Ben Thomas
LW	11	Blair Murray
FH	10	Gareth Anscombe		(substituted off) 65'
SH	9	Tomos Williams
N8	8	Aaron Wainwright		(substituted off) 64'
OF	7	Tommy Reffell	(yellow card) 14'	(substituted off) 46'
BF	6	Taine Plumtree
RL	5	Adam Beard
LL	4	Will Rowlands		(substituted off) 64'
TP	3	Archie Griffin		(substituted off) 46'
HK	2	Dewi Lake (c)		(substituted off) 46'
LP	1	Gareth Thomas		(substituted off) 46'
Replacements:
HK	16	Ryan Elias		(substituted on) 46'
PR	17	Nicky Smith		(substituted on) 46'
PR	18	Keiron Assiratti		(substituted on) 46'
LK	19	Christ Tshiunza		(substituted on) 64'
FL	20	James Botham		(substituted on) 64'
FL	21	Jac Morgan		(substituted on) 46'
SH	22	Ellis Bevan		(substituted on) 65'
FH	23	Sam Costelow		(substituted on) 18'
Coach:
(New Zealand) Warren Gatland

FB	15	Vuate Karawalevu
RW	14	Jiuta Wainiqolo		(substituted off) 79'
OC	13	Waisea Nayacalevu (c)
IC	12	Josua Tuisova
LW	11	Semi Radradra	(red card) 21'
FH	10	Caleb Muntz
SH	9	Frank Lomani		(substituted off) 65'
N8	8	Elia Canakaivata	(yellow card) 19'
OF	7	Kitione Salawa
BF	6	Meli Derenalagi		(substituted off) 70'
RL	5	Temo Mayanavanua
LL	4	Isoa Nasilasila		(substituted off) 40'
TP	3	Samu Tawake		(substituted off) 46'
HK	2	Tevita Ikanivere		(substituted off) 49'
LP	1	Eroni Mawi		(substituted off) 59'
Substitutions:
HK	16	Sam Matavesi		(substituted on) 49'
PR	17	Haereiti Hetet		(substituted on) 59'
PR	18	Jone Koroiduadua		(substituted on) 46'
LK	19	Mesake Vocevoce		(substituted on) 40'
FL	20	Albert Tuisue		(substituted on) 70'
SH	21	Simione Kuruvoli		(substituted on) 65'
FH	22	Isaiah Armstrong-Ravula		(substituted on) 79'
CE	23	Sireli Maqala		(substituted on) 41'
Coach:
(Australia) Mick Byrne

Player of the Match:
Caleb Muntz (Fiji)

Assistant referees:
Pierre Brousset (France)
Hollie Davidson (Scotland)
Television match official:
Eric Gauzins (France)
Foul play review officer:
Brett Cronan (Australia)

Notes:

- Fiji won a test match away in Wales for the first time in their history.
- Fiji defeated Wales for only the second time across 15 tests, and the first time since the 2007 Rugby World Cup.
- Wales equalled the worst losing streak in their history, matching the record of 10 consecutive test defeats set in 2002–2003.
- Blair Murray (Wales) made his international debut.
- Semi Radradra (Fiji) became the first player ever to receive a 20-minute red card in a test match. He was sent off in the 21st minute, and replaced in the 41st minute by Sireli Maqala.

10 November 2024
16:10 GMT (UTC+0)

Scotland	15–32	South Africa
Pen: Russell (5/5) 16', 21', 32', 43', 60'	Report	Try: Mapimpi (2) 3' m, 34' c T. du Toit 29' c Wiese 79' c Con: Pollard (3/4) 30', 35', 80'; Pen: Pollard (2/2) 64', 73'

Murrayfield Stadium, Edinburgh
Attendance: 67,144
Referee: Christophe Ridley (England)

Team details

FB	15	Tom Jordan		(substituted off) 72'
RW	14	Blair Kinghorn
OC	13	Huw Jones
IC	12	Sione Tuipulotu (c)
LW	11	Duhan van der Merwe
FH	10	Finn Russell
SH	9	Ben White		(substituted off) 68'
N8	8	Jack Dempsey		(substituted off) 63'
OF	7	Rory Darge		(substituted off) 60'
BF	6	Matt Fagerson
RL	5	Scott Cummings	(red card) 10'
LL	4	Grant Gilchrist
TP	3	Zander Fagerson		(substituted off) 65'
HK	2	Ewan Ashman		(substituted off) 61'
LP	1	Pierre Schoeman		(substituted off) 61'
Substitutions:
HK	16	Dylan Richardson		(substituted on) 61'
PR	17	Rory Sutherland		(substituted on) 61'
PR	18	Elliot Millar-Mills		(substituted on) 65'
LK	19	Max Williamson		(substituted on) 30'
N8	20	Josh Bayliss		(substituted on) 63'
FL	21	Jamie Ritchie		(substituted on) 60'
SH	22	Jamie Dobie		(substituted on) 68'
CE	23	Stafford McDowall		(substituted on) 72'
Coach:
(Scotland) Gregor Townsend

FB	15	Willie le Roux
RW	14	Canan Moodie
OC	13	Lukhanyo Am
IC	12	André Esterhuizen
LW	11	Makazole Mapimpi	(yellow card) 57'
FH	10	Handré Pollard
SH	9	Jaden Hendrikse		(substituted off) 68'
N8	8	Kwagga Smith		(substituted off) 45'
BF	7	Elrigh Louw		(substituted off) 45'
OF	6	Marco van Staden		(substituted off) 45'
RL	5	Franco Mostert		(substituted off) 40'
LL	4	Eben Etzebeth (c)
TP	3	Thomas du Toit		(substituted off) 45'
HK	2	Bongi Mbonambi		(substituted off) 45'
LP	1	Ox Nché		(substituted off) 45'
Substitutions:
HK	16	Malcolm Marx		(substituted on) 45'
PR	17	Gerhard Steenekamp		(substituted on) 45'
PR	18	Vincent Koch		(substituted on) 45'
LK	19	RG Snyman		(substituted on) 40'
FL	20	Siya Kolisi		(substituted on) 45'
FL	21	Pieter-Steph du Toit		(substituted on) 45'
N8	22	Jasper Wiese		(substituted on) 45'
SH	23	Grant Williams		(substituted on) 68'
Coach:
(South Africa) Rassie Erasmus

Player of the Match:
Eben Etzebeth (South Africa)

Assistant referees:
Luke Pearce (England)
Craig Evans (Wales)
Television match official:
Ian Tempest (England)
Foul play review officer:
Tual Trainini (France)

Notes:

- Kwagga Smith (South Africa) earned his 50th test cap.
- Scott Cummings (Scotland) received a 20-minute red card in the 10th minute of the match. He was replaced in the 30th minute by Max Williamson.

=== 15/16/17 November ===
15 November 2024
20:10 WET (UTC+0)

Ireland	22–19	Argentina
Try: Crowley 3' c Hansen 5' m J. McCarthy 31' c Con: Crowley (2/3) 4', 32'; Drop: Crowley (1/1) 20'	Report	Try: Mallía 44' c Con: Albornoz (1/1) 45'; Pen: Albornoz (4/4) 11', 17', 25', 50'

Aviva Stadium, Dublin
Attendance: 51,700
Referee: Paul Williams (New Zealand)

Team details

FB	15	Hugo Keenan
RW	14	Mack Hansen
OC	13	Garry Ringrose
IC	12	Robbie Henshaw		(substituted off) 62'
LW	11	James Lowe
FH	10	Jack Crowley		(substituted off) 61'
SH	9	Jamison Gibson-Park		(substituted off) 73'
N8	8	Caelan Doris (c)
OF	7	Josh van der Flier		(substituted off) 23'	(substituted on) 28'
BF	6	Tadhg Beirne
RL	5	James Ryan		(substituted off) 61'
LL	4	Joe McCarthy	(yellow card) 49'
TP	3	Finlay Bealham	(yellow card) 15'			(substituted off) 52'
HK	2	Rónan Kelleher		(substituted off) 62'
LP	1	Andrew Porter		(substituted off) 66'
Substitutions:
HK	16	Rob Herring		(substituted on) 62'
PR	17	Cian Healy		(substituted on) 66'
PR	18	Tom Clarkson		(substituted on) 23'	(substituted off) 28'	(substituted on) 52'
LK	19	Ryan Baird		(substituted on) 61'	(substituted off) 64'
FL	20	Peter O'Mahony			(substituted on) 64'
SH	21	Craig Casey		(substituted on) 73'
FH	22	Sam Prendergast		(substituted on) 61'
CE	23	Jamie Osborne		(substituted on) 62'
Coach:
(England) Andy Farrell

FB	15	Juan Cruz Mallía
RW	14	Rodrigo Isgró		(substituted off) 57'
OC	13	Lucio Cinti		(substituted off) 58'
IC	12	Matías Moroni	(yellow card) 1'
LW	11	Bautista Delguy
FH	10	Tomás Albornoz
SH	9	Gonzalo Bertranou		(substituted off) 44'
N8	8	Joaquín Oviedo
OF	7	Juan Martín González
BF	6	Pablo Matera		(substituted off) 62'
RL	5	Pedro Rubiolo
LL	4	Guido Petti		(substituted off) 51'
TP	3	Joel Sclavi		(substituted off) 51'
HK	2	Julián Montoya (c)		(substituted off) 22'	(substituted on) 33'	(substituted off) 62'
LP	1	Thomas Gallo		(substituted off) 21'	(substituted on) 35'	(substituted off) 72'
Substitutions:
HK	16	Ignacio Ruiz		(substituted on) 22'	(substituted off) 33'	(substituted on) 62'
PR	17	Ignacio Calles		(substituted on) 21'	(substituted off) 35'	(substituted on) 72'
PR	18	Francisco Gómez Kodela	(yellow card) 74'	(substituted on) 51'
LK	19	Franco Molina		(substituted on) 51'
FL	20	Santiago Grondona		(substituted on) 62'
SH	21	Gonzalo García		(substituted on) 46'
FH	22	Santiago Carreras		(substituted on) 57'
CE	23	Justo Piccardo		(substituted on) 58'
Coach:
(Argentina) Felipe Contepomi

Player of the Match:
Joe McCarthy (Ireland)

Assistant referees:
Craig Evans (Wales)
Angus Mabey (New Zealand)
Television match official:
Richard Kelly (New Zealand)
Foul play review officer:
Andrew Jackson (England)

Notes:

- Ireland retained the Admiral Brown Cup.
- Tom Clarkson, Sam Prendergast (both Ireland) and Justo Piccardo (Argentina) made their international debuts.
- Cian Healy made his 133rd international appearance, equalling Ireland's all-time test cap record (tied with Brian O'Driscoll).

16 November 2024
16:00 KST (UTC+9)

South Korea	22–27	Zimbabwe
Try: Soo Hyuk 34' c Geon-gyu 62' m Noh 76' c Con: Ki Min (2/3) 35', 77'; Pen: Ki Min (1/1) 17'	Report	Try: Mavesere (2) 3' c, 67' c Burnett 10' c Con: Prior (3/3) 4', 11', 68'; Pen: Prior (2/3) 2', 43'

Incheon Namdong Asiad Rugby Field, Incheon
Referee: Koki Yamauchi (Japan)

16 November 2024
16:00 HKT (UTC+8)

Hong Kong	38–17	Brazil
Try: Shing 5' c Spanton 55' c Axten-Burrett 66' c Worley 75' m Con: De Thierry (3/4) 6', 56', 66'; Pen: De Thierry (4/4) 26', 39', 42', 54'	Report	Try: Bastardie 30' c Dias 34'; Ferreira 47'; Con: Tranquez (1/3) 31'

Kai Tak Youth Sportsground, Kowloon
Referee: Katsuki Furuse (Japan)

Team details

FB	15	Matt Worley
RW	14	Charlie Higson-Smith	(substituted off) 65'
OC	13	Benjamin Axten-Burrett
IC	12	Tom Hill
LW	11	Guy Spanton	(substituted off) 76'
FH	10	Nathan De Thierry
SH	9	Jamie Lauder	(substituted off) 61'
N8	8	Joshua Hrstich (c)
OF	7	Pierce MacKinlay-West
BF	6	Tyler McNutt	(substituted off) 40'
RL	5	Kyle Sullivan
LL	4	Mark Prior	(substituted off) 56'
TP	3	Keelan Chapman	(substituted off) 49'
HK	2	Lam Jak Shing	(substituted off) 68'
LP	1	Sunia Fameitau	(substituted off) 56'
Replacements:
HK	16	Jude Harding	(substituted on) 68'
PR	17	James Holmes	(substituted on) 56'
PR	18	Zacceus Cinnamond	(substituted on) 49'
LK	19	Jamie Pincott	(substituted on) 56'
N8	20	Luke van der Smit	(substituted on) 40'
SH	21	Jack Combes	(substituted on) 61'
FH	22	Matteo Avitabile	(substituted on) 65'
CE	23	Maxwell Threlkeld	(substituted on) 76'
Coach:
(New Zealand) Andrew Douglas

FB	15	Lucas Tranquez
RW	14	Théo Bastardie
OC	13	Lorenzo Massari
IC	12	Robert Tenório	(substituted off) 76'
LW	11	Daniel Lima
FH	10	João Amaral
SH	9	Felipe Gonçalves
N8	8	Adrio de Melo	(substituted off) 45'
BF	7	Matheus Cláudio	(substituted off) 68'
OF	6	Cléber Dias (c)
RL	5	Gabriel Oliveira	(substituted off) 55'
LL	4	Gabriel Paganini	(substituted off) 46'
TP	3	Matheus Rocha	(substituted off) 68'
HK	2	Wilton Rebolo	(substituted off) 46'
LP	1	Caíque Silva	(substituted off) 46'
Replacements:
HK	16	Henrique Ferreira	(substituted on) 46'
PR	17	João Marino	(substituted on) 46'
PR	18	Leonel Moreno	(substituted on) 68'
LK	19	Ben Donald	(substituted on) 46'
LK	20	Hélder Bryan Lúcio	(substituted on) 68'
LK	21	Matteo Dell'Acqua	(substituted on) 55'
FL	22	Rafael Teixeira	(substituted on) 45'
FH	23	Nicolas Azevedo	(substituted on) 76'
Coach:
(Uruguay) Emiliano Caffera

Assistant referees:
Reuben Keane (Australia)
Morgan White (Hong Kong China)

Notes:

- Nicolas Azevedo, Théo Bastardie and Hélder Bryan Lúcio (all Brazil) made their international debuts.

16 November 2024
15:30 GST (UTC+4)

United Arab Emirates	20–26	Germany
Try: Naisau 15' c Kennedy 50' c Con: Kennedy (2/2) 16', 51'; Pen: Kennedy (2/2) 38', 43'	Report	Try: Lammers (2) 23' c, 60' m Hacker 40' c Henn 47' c Con: Klewinghaus (3/4) 24', 40', 48'

The Sevens Stadium, Dubai
Referee: Ibuki Tetsuka (Japan)

Notes:

- This was the first meeting between these two sides.

16 November 2024
16:00 EAT (UTC+03)

Uganda	5–21	Kenya

Kings Park Arena, Kampala

16 November 2024
14:00 CET (UTC+1)

Netherlands	20–17	Chile
Try: van der Avoird (2) 63' c, 68' c Con: Meijer (2/2) 64', 69'; Pen: Meijer (2/3) 10', 16'	Report	Try: Tchimino 40' c D. Escobar 73' c Con: S. Videla (2/2) 40', 74'; Pen: S. Videla (1/1) 5'

NRCA Stadium, Amsterdam
Referee: Jeremy Rozier (France)

Notes:

- This was the first meeting between these two sides.

16 November 2024
14:30 CET (UTC+1)

Japan	36–20	Uruguay
Try: Himeno 10' m Hamano 32' m Shimokawa 36' m Naikabula 52' m Riley 78' c Con: Saitō (1/2) 79'; Pen: Matsunaga (2/2) 21', 60'; Saitō (1/2) 69'	Report	Try: Diana 7' c Bianchi 44' c Con: S. Álvarez (2/2) 8', 45'; Pen: S. Álvarez (2/2) 20', 40'

Chambéry Savoie Stadium, Chambéry, France
Attendance: 6085
Referee: Christophe Ridley (England)

Team details

FB	15	Malo Tuitama		(substituted off) 55'
RW	14	Jone Naikabula
OC	13	Dylan Riley
IC	12	Siosaia Fifita		(substituted off) 79'
LW	11	Junta Hamano
FH	10	Takurō Matsunaga
SH	9	Naoto Saitō (c)	(yellow card) 39'	(substituted off) 79'
N8	8	Kazuki Himeno
OF	7	Kanji Shimokawa
BF	6	Amato Fakatava		(substituted off) 47'
RL	5	Warner Dearns	(red card) 66'
LL	4	Epineri Uluiviti		(substituted off) 55'
TP	3	Keijiro Tamefusa		(substituted off) 62'
HK	2	Mamoru Harada		(substituted off) 69'
LP	1	Takato Okabe		(substituted off) 66'
Substitutions:
HK	16	Kenta Matsuoka		(substituted on) 69'
PR	17	Yukio Morikawa		(substituted on) 66'
PR	18	Opeti Helu		(substituted on) 62'
LK	19	Sanaila Waqa		(substituted on) 55'
FL	20	Isaiah Mapusua		(substituted on) 47'
SH	21	Shinobu Fujiwara		(substituted on) 79'
CE	22	Nicholas McCurran		(substituted on) 55'
CE	23	Yusuke Kajimura		(substituted on) 79'
Coach:
(Australia) Eddie Jones

FB	15	Juan González	(substituted off) 70'
RW	14	Bautista Basso
OC	13	Felipe Arcos Pérez
IC	12	Juan Manuel Alonso	(substituted off) 18'
LW	11	Ignacio Facciolo
FH	10	Ícaro Amarillo
SH	9	Santiago Álvarez
N8	8	Manuel Diana	(substituted off) 40'
OF	7	Lucas Bianchi
BF	6	Santiago Civetta
RL	5	Manuel Leindekar (c)
LL	4	Ignacio Dotti	(substituted off) 41'
TP	3	Diego Arbelo	(substituted off) 40'
HK	2	Guillermo Pujadas	(substituted off) 67'
LP	1	Mateo Sanguinetti	(substituted off) 63'
Replacements:
HK	16	Joaquín Myszka	(substituted on) 67'
PR	17	Mateo Perillo	(substituted on) 63'
PR	18	Ignacio Péculo	(substituted on) 40'
LK	19	Felipe Aliaga	(substituted on) 41'
N8	20	Carlos Deus	(substituted on) 40'
SH	21	Joaquín Suárez	(substituted on) 18'
FH	22	Ignacio Álvarez
FB	23	Gastón Mieres	(substituted on) 70'
Coach:
(Argentina) Rodolfo Ambrosio

Assistant referees:
Luc Ramos (France)
Adam Leal (England)
Television match official:
Tual Trainini (France)

16 November 2024
15:00 CET (UTC+1)

Spain	19–33	Fiji
Try: Penalty try 21'; Pen: López-Bontempo (4/4) 10', 42', 48', 52'	Report	Try: Loganimasi 11' c Maqala 54' m Matavesi 58' c Nayacalevu 63' c Turagacoke 69' c Con: Muntz (4/5) 12', 59', 64', 70'

Estadio José Zorrilla, Valladolid
Attendance: 16,500
Referee: Morné Ferreira (South Africa)

Team details

FB	15	J. W. Bell	(yellow card) 27'
RW	14	Gauthier Minguillón		(substituted off) 47'
OC	13	Iñaki Mateu		(substituted off) 66'
IC	12	Alejandro Alonso
LW	11	Martiniano Cian
FH	10	Gonzalo López-Bontempo
SH	9	Estanislao Bay
N8	8	Ekain Imaz	(yellow card) 28'
OF	7	Alex Saleta
BF	6	Vicente Boronat		(substituted off) 53'
RL	5	Imanol Urraza		(substituted off) 64'
LL	4	Ignacio Piñeiro
TP	3	Lucas Santamaría		(substituted off) 64'
HK	2	Álvaro García (c)		(substituted off) 57'
LP	1	Thierry Futeu		(substituted off) 61'
Replacements:
HK	16	Santiago Ovejero		(substituted on) 57'
PR	17	Bernardo Vázquez		(substituted on) 61'
PR	18	Jacobo Ruiz		(substituted on) 64'
LK	19	Pablo Guirao		(substituted on) 64'
FL	20	Raphaël Nieto		(substituted on) 53'
SH	21	Ike Irusta
FH	22	Gonzalo Vinuesa		(substituted on) 66'
WG	23	Alberto Carmona		(substituted on) 47'
Coach:
(Argentina) Pablo Bouza

FB	15	Isaiah Armstrong-Ravula		(substituted off) 52'
RW	14	Jiuta Wainiqolo
OC	13	Sireli Maqala		(substituted off) 70'
IC	12	Waisea Nayacalevu (c)
LW	11	Ponepati Loganimasi
FH	10	Caleb Muntz
SH	9	Simione Kuruvoli	(yellow card) 21'	(substituted off) 70'
N8	8	Albert Tuisue		(substituted off) 66'
OF	7	Saimoni Uluinakauvadra
BF	6	Vilive Miramira
RL	5	Leone Rotuisolia		(substituted off) 64'
LL	4	Mesake Vocevoce
TP	3	Luke Tagi		(substituted off) 54'
HK	2	Sam Matavesi		(substituted off) 64'
LP	1	Eroni Mawi		(substituted off) 54'
Substitutions:
HK	16	Mesulame Dolokoto		(substituted on) 64'
PR	17	Haereiti Hetet		(substituted on) 54'
PR	18	Jone Koroiduadua		(substituted on) 54'
LK	19	Setareki Turagacoke		(substituted on) 64'
FL	20	Elia Canakaivata		(substituted on) 66'
SH	21	Peni Matawalu		(substituted on) 70'
FH	22	Vilimoni Botitu		(substituted on) 52'
CE	23	Inia Tabuavou		(substituted on) 70'
Coach:
(Australia) Mick Byrne

Assistant referees:
Aimee Barrett-Theron (South Africa)
Federico Vedovelli (Italy)
Television match official:
Quinton Immelman (South Africa)

Notes:

- Temo Mayanavanua (Fiji) was originally named among the substitutes, but withdrew the day of the match due to injury. He was replaced on the bench by Setareki Turagacoke.
- Jacobo Ruiz (Spain), Setareki Turagacoke and Saimoni Uluinakauvadra (both Fiji) made their international debuts.

16 November 2024
15:10 GMT (UTC+0)

Scotland	59–21	Portugal
Try: Hurd 3' m McDowall 11' c Penalty try 26'; Graham 33' c Bayliss 37' c Bhatti 43' m Reed (2) 58' c, 61' c Dobie 72' c Con: Hastings (5/7) 11', 34', 38', 59', 62' c Jordan (1/1) 73' c	Report	Try: Begic 42' c Marques 54' c Storti 66' c Con: Marques (3/3) 43', 55', 67'

Murrayfield Stadium, Edinburgh
Attendance: 61,027
Referee: Takehito Namekawa (Japan)

Team details

FB	15	Tom Jordan
RW	14	Darcy Graham
OC	13	Rory Hutchinson	(substituted off) 58'
IC	12	Stafford McDowall (c)
LW	11	Arron Reed
FH	10	Adam Hastings	(substituted off) 65'
SH	9	George Horne	(substituted off) 58'
N8	8	Josh Bayliss
OF	7	Ben Muncaster	(substituted off) 65'
BF	6	Luke Crosbie
RL	5	Alex Samuel		(substituted off) 67'
LL	4	Alex Craig	(substituted off) 50'	(substituted on) 67'
TP	3	Will Hurd	(substituted off) 50'
HK	2	Patrick Harrison	(substituted off) 65'
LP	1	Jamie Bhatti	(substituted off) 49'
Substitutions:
HK	16	Johnny Matthews	(substituted on) 65'
PR	17	Rory Sutherland	(substituted on) 49'
PR	18	Elliot Millar-Mills	(substituted on) 50'
LK	19	Ewan Johnson	(substituted on) 50'
FL	20	Freddy Douglas	(substituted on) 65'
SH	21	Jamie Dobie	(substituted on) 58'
CE	22	Matt Currie	(substituted on) 58'
WG	23	Kyle Rowe	(substituted on) 65'
Coach:
(Scotland) Gregor Townsend

FB	15	Simão Bento
RW	14	Raffaele Storti
OC	13	José Lima
IC	12	Tomás Appleton
LW	11	Lucas Martins		(substituted off) 46'
FH	10	Domingos Cabral		(substituted off) 58'
SH	9	Samuel Marques		(substituted off) 78'
N8	8	Frederico Couto		(substituted off) 48'	(substituted on) 50'
OF	7	Nicolas Martins
BF	6	André da Cunha			(substituted off) 50'
RL	5	Duarte Torgal	(yellow card) 26'
LL	4	José Madeira		(substituted off) 40'
TP	3	Diogo Hasse Ferreira		(substituted off) 54'
HK	2	Luka Begic		(substituted off) 54'
LP	1	David Costa		(substituted off) 54'
Substitutions:
PR	16	Abel da Cunha		(substituted on) 54'
HK	17	Pedro Vicente		(substituted on) 54'
PR	18	António Prim		(substituted on) 54'
LK	19	António Rebelo de Andrade		(substituted on) 40'
FL	20	Vasco Baptista		(substituted on) 48'
SH	21	António Campos		(substituted on) 78'
FH	22	Hugo Aubry		(substituted on) 58'
FB	23	Manuel Cardoso Pinto		(substituted on) 46'
Coach:
(New Zealand) Simon Mannix

Player of the Match:
Tom Jordan (Scotland)

Assistant referees:
Luke Pearce (England)
Anthony Woodthorpe (England)
Television match official:
Brian MacNeice (Ireland)
Foul play review officer:
Mark Patton (Ireland)

Notes:

- Alex Samuel, Ben Muncaster and Freddy Douglas (all Scotland) made their international debuts.
- Darcy Graham scored his 29th international try, equalling Scotland's all-time try scoring record (tied with Duhan van der Merwe).

16 November 2024
18:00 EET (UTC+2)

Romania	35–27	Canada
Try: Manumua 31' m Chirică 33' c Neagu (2) 42' c, 69' m Horvat 50' m Con: Conache (2/4) 34', 43'; Pen: Conache (2/2) 16', 22'	Report	Try: Penalty try 12'; Rumball 48' c Parry 55' c Con: Nelson (2/2) 49', 56'; Pen: Nelson (2/2) 26', 37'

Stadionul Arcul de Triumf, Bucharest
Referee: Sam Grove-White (Scotland)

Team details

FB	15	Ovidiu Neagu		(substituted off) 75'
RW	14	Talia'uli Sikuea
OC	13	Mihai Graure		(substituted off) 51'	(substituted on) 59'
IC	12	Jason Tomane	(red card) 64'
LW	11	Tevita Manumua
FH	10	Hinckley Vaovasa
SH	9	Alin Conache		(substituted off) 60'
N8	8	Adrian Mitu		(substituted off) 45'	(substituted on) 54'
OF	7	Cristi Chirică (c)		(substituted off) 40'
BF	6	Cristi Boboc	(yellow card) 12'
RL	5	Andrei Mahu
LL	4	Nicolaas Immelman		(substituted off) 67'
TP	3	Vasile Balan		(substituted off) 49'
HK	2	Stefan Buruiana	(yellow card) 44'		(substituted off) 54'
LP	1	Alexandru Savin		(substituted off) 49'
Replacements:
HK	16	Ovidiu Cojocaru		(substituted on) 45'
PR	17	Iulian Harțig		(substituted on) 49'
PR	18	Cosmin Manole		(substituted on) 49'
LK	19	Yanis Horvat		(substituted on) 40'
FL	20	Vlad Neculau		(substituted on) 67'
SH	21	Gabriel Rupanu		(substituted on) 60'
CE	22	Alexandru Bucur		(substituted on) 51'	(substituted off) 59'
FB	23	Paul Popoaia		(substituted on) 75'
Coach:
(France) David Gérard

FB	15	Cooper Coats
RW	14	Andrew Coe	(yellow card) 29'	(substituted off) 70'
OC	13	Mitch Richardson
IC	12	Noah Flesch
LW	11	Nic Benn
FH	10	Peter Nelson		(substituted off) 64'	(substituted on) 70'
SH	9	Brock Gallagher		(substituted off) 75'
N8	8	Lucas Rumball (c)
OF	7	Siôn Parry		(substituted off) 66'
BF	6	Matt Heaton
RL	5	Mason Flesch
LL	4	James Stockwood		(substituted off) 36'
TP	3	Conor Young		(substituted off) 78'
HK	2	Andrew Quattrin		(substituted off) 72'
LP	1	Calixto Martinez		(substituted off) 78'
Replacements:
HK	16	Jesse Mackail		(substituted on) 72'
PR	17	Sam Miller		(substituted on) 78'
PR	18	Tyler Matcham		(substituted on) 78'
LK	19	Callum Botchar			(substituted on) 75'
LK	20	Izzak Kelly		(substituted on) 36'	(substituted off) 75'
N8	21	Matthew Oworu		(substituted on) 66'
SH	22	Jesse Kilgour		(substituted on) 75'
CE	23	Rhys James		(substituted on) 64'	(substituted off) 70'
Coach:
(Wales) Kingsley Jones

Assistant referees:
Saba Abulashvili (Georgia)
Ruairidh Campbell (Scotland)
Television match official:
Andrew McMenemy (Scotland)

Notes:

- Rhys James, Jesse Kilgour and Sam Miller (all Canada) made their international debuts.

16 November 2024
17:30 CET (UTC+1)

United States	36–17	Tonga
Try: Besag 9' m Damm 19' c Iscaro 26' c de Haas 46' c MacGinty 54' c Con: MacGinty (4/5) 20', 27', 47', 55'; Pen: MacGinty (1/1) 71'	Report	Try: F. Paea 5' c Fainga'anuku 49' m Nginingini 65' m Con: Pellegrini (1/2) 6'

Chambéry Savoie Stadium, Chambéry, France
Referee: Hollie Davidson (Scotland)

Team details

FB	15	Mitch Wilson	(red card) 36'
RW	14	Conner Mooneyham		(substituted off) 36'
OC	13	Dominic Besag
IC	12	Tavite Lopeti
LW	11	Nate Augspurger
FH	10	AJ MacGinty
SH	9	Ruben de Haas		(substituted off) 74'
N8	8	Paddy Ryan
OF	7	Cory Daniel
BF	6	Vili Helu		(substituted off) 64'
RL	5	Greg Peterson (c)
LL	4	Jason Damm		(substituted off) 71'
TP	3	Alex Maughan		(substituted off) 61'
HK	2	Shilo Klein		(substituted off) 45'
LP	1	Jack Iscaro		(substituted off) 67'
Replacements:
HK	16	Kapeli Pifeleti		(substituted on) 45'
PR	17	Jake Turnbull		(substituted on) 67'
PR	18	Paul Mullen		(substituted on) 61'
LK	19	Tomás Casares		(substituted on) 64'
FL	20	Mikey Grandy		(substituted on) 71'
SH	21	Ethan McVeigh		(substituted on) 74'
WG	22	Mark O'Keeffe		(substituted on) 36'
FH	23	Luke Carty		(substituted on) 56'
Coach:
(United States) Scott Lawrence

FB	15	William Havili
RW	14	Taniela Filimone	(substituted off) 74'
OC	13	Fine Inisi
IC	12	Fetuli Paea
LW	11	Tima Fainga'anuku
FH	10	Patrick Pellegrini	(substituted off) 61'
SH	9	Aisea Halo	(substituted off) 58'
N8	8	Lotu Inisi
OF	7	Sione Havili Talitui
BF	6	Tupou Ma'afu-Afungia	(substituted off) 66'
RL	5	Harison Mataele	(substituted off) 44'
LL	4	Semisi Paea
TP	3	Ben Tameifuna (c)	(substituted off) 55'
HK	2	Sam Moli	(substituted off) 71'
LP	1	Tau Koloamatangi	(substituted off) 55'
Replacements:
HK	16	Sosefo Sakalia	(substituted on) 71'
PR	17	Salesi Tuifua	(substituted on) 55'
PR	18	Paula Latu	(substituted on) 55'
LK	19	Justin Mataele	(substituted on) 66'
LK	20	Tevita Ahokovi	(substituted on) 44'
SH	21	Siaosi Nginingini	(substituted on) 58'
FB	22	Josiah Unga	(substituted on) 74'
FH	23	Poasi Tonga	(substituted on) 61'
Coach:
(Tonga) Tevita Tu'ifua

Assistant referees:
Luc Ramos (France)
Adam Leal (England)
Television match official:
Tual Trainini (France)

Notes:

- United States recorded their first win over Tonga since their 30–10 victory in 1999, which was the first time the two sides met.
- Mikey Grandy, Mark O'Keeffe (both United States) and Poasi Tonga (Tonga) made their international debuts.
- Mitch Wilson (United States) received a 20-minute red card in the 36th minute of the match. He was replaced in the 56th minute by Luke Carty.

16 November 2024
17:40 GMT (UTC+0)

England	20–29	South Africa
Try: Sleightholme 3' c Underhill 25' c Con: Smith (2/2) 4', 26'; Pen: Smith (2/2) 15', 51'	Report	Try: Williams 10' c P. du Toit 16' m Kolbe (2) 21' c, 62' c Con: Libbok (2/3) 11', 22'; Pollard (1/1) 63'; Pen: Pollard (1/1) 58'

Allianz Stadium, London
Attendance: 81,910
Referee: Andrew Brace (Ireland)

Team details

FB	15	Freddie Steward
RW	14	Tommy Freeman
OC	13	Ollie Lawrence
IC	12	Henry Slade	(substituted off) 48'	(substituted on) 58'
LW	11	Ollie Sleightholme
FH	10	Marcus Smith
SH	9	Jack van Poortvliet	(substituted off) 60'
N8	8	Ben Earl
OF	7	Sam Underhill	(substituted off) 66'
BF	6	Chandler Cunningham-South
RL	5	George Martin	(substituted off) 75'
LL	4	Maro Itoje
TP	3	Will Stuart	(substituted off) 58'
HK	2	Jamie George (c)	(substituted off) 48'
LP	1	Ellis Genge	(substituted off) 63'
Substitutions:
HK	16	Luke Cowan-Dickie	(substituted on) 48'
PR	17	Fin Baxter	(substituted on) 63'
PR	18	Dan Cole	(substituted on) 58'
LK	19	Nick Isiekwe	(substituted on) 75'
N8	20	Alex Dombrandt	(substituted on) 66'
SH	21	Harry Randall	(substituted on) 60'
FH	22	George Ford
WG	23	Tom Roebuck	(substituted on) 48'	(substituted off) 58'
Coach:
(England) Steve Borthwick

FB	15	Aphelele Fassi
RW	14	Cheslin Kolbe
OC	13	Jesse Kriel
IC	12	Damian de Allende		(substituted off) 68'
LW	11	Kurt-Lee Arendse
FH	10	Manie Libbok		(substituted off) 45'
SH	9	Grant Williams		(substituted off) 60'
N8	8	Jasper Wiese		(substituted off) 60'
BF	7	Pieter-Steph du Toit		(substituted off) 60'	(substituted on) 66'
OF	6	Siya Kolisi (c)			(substituted off) 71'	(substituted on) 78'
RL	5	RG Snyman
LL	4	Eben Etzebeth			(substituted off) 66'
TP	3	Wilco Louw		(substituted off) 40'	(substituted on) 71'	(substituted off) 78'
HK	2	Bongi Mbonambi		(substituted off) 45'
LP	1	Ox Nché		(substituted off) 32'
Substitutions:
HK	16	Malcolm Marx		(substituted on) 45'
PR	17	Gerhard Steenekamp	(yellow card) 67'	(substituted on) 32'
PR	18	Vincent Koch		(substituted on) 40'
FL	19	Elrigh Louw		(substituted on) 60'
FL	20	Kwagga Smith		(substituted on) 60'
SH	21	Cobus Reinach		(substituted on) 60'
FH	22	Handré Pollard		(substituted on) 45'
CE	23	Lukhanyo Am		(substituted on) 68'
Coach:
(South Africa) Rassie Erasmus

Player of the Match:
Cheslin Kolbe (South Africa)

Assistant referees:
Chris Busby (Ireland)
Eoghan Cross (Ireland)
Television match official:
Ben Whitehouse (Wales)
Foul play review officer:
Mike Adamson (Scotland)

16 November 2024
21:10 CET (UTC+1)

France	30–29	New Zealand
Try: Buros 32' c Boudehent 43' c Bielle-Biarrey 50' c Con: Ramos (3/3) 32', 44', 51'; Pen: Ramos (3/3) 6', 57', 72'	Report	Try: Lakai 8' c Roigard 26' c Con: B. Barrett (2/2) 9', 27'; Pen: B. Barrett (1/1) 36'; McKenzie (4/4) 54', 61', 67', 74'

Stade de France, Saint-Denis
Attendance: 80,000
Referee: Nika Amashukeli (Georgia)

Team details

FB	15	Romain Buros	(substituted off) 67'
RW	14	Gabin Villière
OC	13	Gaël Fickou
IC	12	Yoram Moefana	(substituted off) 59'
LW	11	Louis Bielle-Biarrey
FH	10	Thomas Ramos
SH	9	Antoine Dupont (c)
N8	8	Grégory Alldritt	(substituted off) 48'
OF	7	Alexandre Roumat
BF	6	Paul Boudehent		(substituted off) 69'
RL	5	Emmanuel Meafou	(substituted off) 48'
LL	4	Thibaud Flament
TP	3	Tevita Tatafu	(substituted off) 9'
HK	2	Peato Mauvaka	(substituted off) 48'	(substituted on) 69'
LP	1	Jean-Baptiste Gros	(substituted off) 48'
Substitutions:
HK	16	Julien Marchand	(substituted on) 48'
PR	17	Reda Wardi	(substituted on) 48'
PR	18	Georges-Henri Colombe	(substituted on) 9'
LK	19	Romain Taofifénua	(substituted on) 48'	(substituted off) 55'
FL	20	Mickaël Guillard	(substituted on) 48'
FL	21	Charles Ollivon		(substituted on) 55'
SH	22	Nolann Le Garrec	(substituted on) 67'
CE	23	Émilien Gailleton	(substituted on) 59'
Coach:
(France) Fabien Galthié

FB	15	Will Jordan
RW	14	Sevu Reece	(substituted off) 52'
OC	13	Rieko Ioane
IC	12	Jordie Barrett	(substituted off) 36'
LW	11	Caleb Clarke
FH	10	Beauden Barrett
SH	9	Cam Roigard	(substituted off) 52'
N8	8	Wallace Sititi
OF	7	Ardie Savea
BF	6	Samipeni Finau	(substituted off) 1'
RL	5	Tupou Vaa'i	(substituted off) 54'
LL	4	Scott Barrett (c)
TP	3	Tyrel Lomax	(substituted off) 61'
HK	2	Codie Taylor	(substituted off) 61'
LP	1	Tamaiti Williams	(substituted off) 61'
Substitutions:
HK	16	Asafo Aumua	(substituted on) 61'
PR	17	Ofa Tu'ungafasi	(substituted on) 61'
PR	18	Pasilio Tosi	(substituted on) 61'
LK	19	Patrick Tuipulotu	(substituted on) 54'
FL	20	Peter Lakai	(substituted on) 1'
SH	21	Cortez Ratima	(substituted on) 52'
CE	22	Anton Lienert-Brown	(substituted on) 36'
FH	23	Damian McKenzie	(substituted on) 52'
Coach:
(New Zealand) Scott Robertson

Player of the Match:
Thomas Ramos (France)

Assistant referees:
Matthew Carley (England)
Andrea Piardi (Italy)
Television match official:
Marius Jonker (South Africa)
Foul play review officer:
Ian Tempest (England)

Notes:

- France retained the Dave Gallaher Trophy for the first time since 2009 and 2021.
- France won three consecutive matches against New Zealand for the first time since 1994–1995.
- Romain Buros (France) made his international debut.
- Patrick Tuipulotu (New Zealand) earned his 50th test cap.

17 November 2024
14:40 CET (UTC+1)

Italy	20–17	Georgia
Try: Penalty try 53'; Fusco 63' c Con: Garbisi (1/1) 64'; Pen: Garbisi (2/2) 22', 31'	Report	Try: Tabutsadze 23' c Lobzhanidze 37' c Con: Matkava (2/2) 24', 38'; Pen: Matkava (1/1) 33'

Stadio Luigi Ferraris, Genoa
Attendance: 14,771
Referee: Ben O'Keeffe (New Zealand)

Team details

FB	15	Matt Gallagher
RW	14	Jacopo Trulla	(substituted off) 38'	(substituted on) 41'
OC	13	Ignacio Brex
IC	12	Tommaso Menoncello	(substituted off) 61'	(substituted on) 69'
LW	11	Monty Ioane
FH	10	Paolo Garbisi
SH	9	Alessandro Garbisi	(substituted off) 61'
N8	8	Ross Vintcent
OF	7	Michele Lamaro (c)	(substituted off) 3'
BF	6	Sebastian Negri
RL	5	Dino Lamb
LL	4	Niccolò Cannone	(substituted off) 61'
TP	3	Simone Ferrari	(substituted off) 54'
HK	2	Giacomo Nicotera	(substituted off) 54'
LP	1	Danilo Fischetti	(substituted off) 54'
Replacements:
HK	16	Gianmarco Lucchesi	(substituted on) 54'
PR	17	Mirco Spagnolo	(substituted on) 54'
PR	18	Pietro Ceccarelli	(substituted on) 54'
LK	19	Riccardo Favretto	(substituted on) 61'
FL	20	Manuel Zuliani	(substituted on) 3'
SH	21	Alessandro Fusco	(substituted on) 61'
FH	22	Leonardo Marin	(substituted on) 38'	(substituted off) 41'
CE	23	Giulio Bertaccini	(substituted on) 61'	(substituted off) 69'
Coach:
(Argentina) Gonzalo Quesada

FB	15	Davit Niniashvili
RW	14	Aka Tabutsadze	(yellow card) 53'
OC	13	Giorgi Kveseladze
IC	12	Tornike Kakhoidze
LW	11	Alexander Todua		(substituted off) 70'
FH	10	Luka Matkava
SH	9	Vasil Lobzhanidze (c)		(substituted off) 54'
N8	8	Tornike Jalaghonia
OF	7	Giorgi Tsutskiridze		(substituted off) 70'
BF	6	Ilia Spanderashvili
RL	5	Giorgi Javakhia		(substituted off) 57'
LL	4	Mikheil Babunashvili
TP	3	Irakli Aptsiauri		(substituted off) 52'
HK	2	Vano Karkadze
LP	1	Nika Abuladze		(substituted off) 57'
Substitutions:
HK	16	Luka Nioradze
PR	17	Giorgi Akhaladze		(substituted on) 57'
PR	18	Luka Japaridze		(substituted on) 52'
LK	19	Lado Chachanidze		(substituted on) 57'
FL	20	Luka Ivanishvili		(substituted on) 70'
SH	21	Gela Aprasidze		(substituted on) 54'
FH	22	Tedo Abzhandadze
CE	23	Demur Tapladze		(substituted on) 70'
Coach:
(England) Richard Cockerill

Player of the Match:
Dino Lamb (Italy)

Assistant referees:
Paul Williams (New Zealand)
Damian Schneider (Argentina)
Television match official:
Glenn Newman (New Zealand)
Foul play review officer:
Andrew Jackson (England)

Notes:

- Giulio Bertaccini (Italy) made his international debut.

17 November 2024
14:00 GMT (UTC+0)

England A	38–17	Australia A
Try: Heyes 6' m Murley (2) 42' m, 77' c Langdon 56' c Fisilau 61' c Muir 67' c Con: Atkinson (2/4) 57', 62'; Shillcock (2/2) 68', 78'	Report	Try: Reimer 9' c van Nek 65' c Con: Lynagh (1/1) 10'; McLaughlin-Phillips (1/1) 66'; Pen: Lynagh (1/1) 30'

Twickenham Stoop Stadium, London
Referee: Eoghan Cross (Ireland)

Team details

FB	15	Joe Carpenter
RW	14	Cadan Murley
OC	13	Oscar Beard
IC	12	Fraser Dingwall (c)
LW	11	Gabriel Ibitoye	(substituted off) 60'
FH	10	Charlie Atkinson	(substituted off) 67'
SH	9	Will Porter	(substituted off) 74'
N8	8	Tom Willis
OF	7	Henry Pollock
BF	6	Tom Pearson	(substituted off) 60'
RL	5	Arthur Clark	(substituted off) 68'
LL	4	Hugh Tizard
TP	3	Joe Heyes	(substituted off) 57'
HK	2	Gabriel Oghre	(substituted off) 43'
LP	1	Asher Opoku-Fordjour	(substituted off) 43'
Substitutions:
HK	16	Curtis Langdon	(substituted on) 43'
PR	17	Emmanuel Iyogun	(substituted on) 43'
PR	18	Afolabi Fasogbon	(substituted on) 57'
LK	19	Rus Tuima	(substituted on) 68'
N8	20	Greg Fisilau	(substituted on) 60'
SH	21	Archie McParland	(substituted on) 74'
FH	22	Jamie Shillcock	(substituted on) 67'
WG	23	Will Muir	(substituted on) 60'
Coach:
(England) Mark Mapletoft

FB	15	Jock Campbell
RW	14	Corey Toole
OC	13	Joey Walton
IC	12	Hamish Stewart	(substituted off) 62'
LW	11	Darby Lancaster
FH	10	Tom Lynagh	(substituted off) 57'
SH	9	Ryan Lonergan (c)	(substituted off) 62'
N8	8	Joe Brial	(substituted off) 51'
OF	7	Luke Reimer
BF	6	Tom Hooper
RL	5	Josh Canham
LL	4	Ryan Smith	(substituted off) 54'
TP	3	Massimo de Lutiis	(substituted off) 60'
HK	2	Josh Nasser	(substituted off) 40'
LP	1	Harry Hoopert	(substituted off) 60'
Substitutions:
HK	16	Lachlan Lonergan	(substituted on) 40'
PR	17	Tom Lambert	(substituted on) 60'
PR	18	Rhys van Nek	(substituted on) 60'
LK	19	Angus Blyth	(substituted on) 54'
FL	20	Rory Scott	(substituted on) 51'
SH	21	Issak Fines-Leleiwasa	(substituted on) 62'
FH	22	Harry McLaughlin-Phillips	(substituted on) 57'
CE	23	Ollie Sapsford	(substituted on) 62'
Coach:
(Australia) Rod Seib

Player of the Match:
Henry Pollock (England A)

Assistant referees:
Hamish Smales (England)
Joe James (England)

17 November 2024
16:10 GMT (UTC+0)

Wales	20–52	Australia
Try: Wainwright 24' c B. Thomas 67' c Con: Anscombe (1/1) 25'; Costelow (1/1) 68'; Pen: Anscombe (2/2) 30', 33'	Report	Try: Wright (3) 12' m, 60' c, 79' m Frost 15' c Faessler (3) 21' c, 46' c, 51' c Ikitau 74' c Con: Lolesio (6/8) 16', 22', 47', 52', 61', 75'

Principality Stadium, Cardiff
Attendance: 56,188
Referee: James Doleman (New Zealand)

Team details

FB	15	Cameron Winnett
RW	14	Tom Rogers	(substituted off) 54'
OC	13	Max Llewellyn
IC	12	Ben Thomas
LW	11	Blair Murray
FH	10	Gareth Anscombe	(substituted off) 54'
SH	9	Ellis Bevan	(substituted off) 48'
N8	8	Aaron Wainwright	(substituted off) 53'
OF	7	Jac Morgan
BF	6	James Botham
RL	5	Adam Beard	(substituted off) 7'
LL	4	Will Rowlands
TP	3	Archie Griffin	(substituted off) 54'
HK	2	Dewi Lake (c)	(substituted off) 54'
LP	1	Gareth Thomas	(substituted off) 54'
Replacements:
HK	16	Ryan Elias	(substituted on) 54'
PR	17	Nicky Smith	(substituted on) 54'
PR	18	Keiron Assiratti	(substituted on) 54'
LK	19	Christ Tshiunza	(substituted on) 7'
FL	20	Tommy Reffell	(substituted on) 53'
SH	21	Rhodri Williams	(substituted on) 48'
FH	22	Sam Costelow	(substituted on) 54'
CE	23	Eddie James	(substituted on) 54'
Coach:
(New Zealand) Warren Gatland

FB	15	Tom Wright
RW	14	Andrew Kellaway
OC	13	Len Ikitau
IC	12	Samu Kerevi	(red card) 42'
LW	11	Max Jorgensen		(substituted off) 75'
FH	10	Noah Lolesio
SH	9	Nic White		(substituted off) 46'
N8	8	Rob Valetini
OF	7	Fraser McReight
BF	6	Seru Uru		(substituted off) 58'
RL	5	Will Skelton		(substituted off) 54'
LL	4	Nick Frost
TP	3	Allan Alaalatoa (c)		(substituted off) 60'
HK	2	Matt Faessler		(substituted off) 58'
LP	1	Angus Bell		(substituted off) 40'	(substituted on) 60'
Replacements:
HK	16	Brandon Paenga-Amosa		(substituted on) 58'
PR	17	James Slipper		(substituted on) 40'	(substituted off) 60'
PR	18	Zane Nonggorr		(substituted on) 60'
LK	19	Lukhan Salakaia-Loto		(substituted on) 54'
FL	20	Langi Gleeson		(substituted on) 58'
SH	21	Tate McDermott		(substituted on) 46'
FH	22	Ben Donaldson		(substituted on) 75'
CE	23	Joseph Sua'ali'i		(substituted on) 62'
Coach:
(New Zealand) Joe Schmidt

Player of the Match:
Tom Wright (Australia)

Assistant referees:
Karl Dickson (England)
Angus Mabey (New Zealand)
Television match official:
Marius van der Westhuizen (South Africa)
Foul play review officer:
Richard Kelly (New Zealand)

Notes:

- Australia retained the James Bevan Trophy.
- This was Australia's biggest ever away win against Wales (by total points scored).
- With this loss, Wales recorded their 11th consecutive test defeat – the longest losing streak in the country's 143-year international rugby history.
- Samu Kerevi and Rob Valetini (both Australia) earned their 50th test caps.
- Samu Kerevi (Australia) received a 20-minute red card in the 42nd minute of the match. He was replaced in the 62nd minute by Joseph Sua'ali'i.

=== 22/23/24 November ===
22 November 2024
21:10 CET (UTC+1)

France	37–23	Argentina
Try: Flament 8' c Villière 32' c Penalty try 36'; Bielle-Biarrey 57' c Con: Ramos (3/3) 9', 33', 58'; Pen: Ramos (3/3) 15', 22', 40'	Report	Try: Gallo 55' c Ruiz 69' c Con: Albornoz (2/2) 56', 69'; Pen: Albornoz (3/3) 14', 19', 25'

Stade de France, Saint-Denis
Attendance: 66,640
Referee: Luke Pearce (England)

Team details

FB	15	Léo Barré	(substituted off) 62'
RW	14	Gabin Villière
OC	13	Gaël Fickou	(substituted off) 71'
IC	12	Yoram Moefana
LW	11	Louis Bielle-Biarrey
FH	10	Thomas Ramos
SH	9	Antoine Dupont (c)
N8	8	Charles Ollivon
OF	7	Paul Boudehent	(substituted off) 40'
BF	6	François Cros
RL	5	Emmanuel Meafou	(substituted off) 51'
LL	4	Thibaud Flament	(substituted off) 60'
TP	3	Uini Atonio	(substituted off) 51'
HK	2	Peato Mauvaka	(substituted off) 51'
LP	1	Jean-Baptiste Gros	(substituted off) 3'
Substitutions:
HK	16	Julien Marchand	(substituted on) 51'
PR	17	Reda Wardi	(substituted on) 3'
PR	18	Georges-Henri Colombe	(substituted on) 51'
FL	19	Alexandre Roumat	(substituted on) 60'
FL	20	Mickaël Guillard	(substituted on) 51'
N8	21	Marko Gazzotti	(substituted on) 40'
SH	22	Nolann Le Garrec	(substituted on) 62'
CE	23	Émilien Gailleton	(substituted on) 71'
Coach:
(France) Fabien Galthié

FB	15	Juan Cruz Mallía
RW	14	Rodrigo Isgró		(substituted off) 5'	(substituted on) 14'
OC	13	Lucio Cinti
IC	12	Matías Moroni		(substituted off) 51'
LW	11	Bautista Delguy		(substituted off) 27'
FH	10	Tomás Albornoz
SH	9	Gonzalo García		(substituted off) 56'
N8	8	Joaquín Oviedo
OF	7	Juan Martín González	(yellow card) 36'
BF	6	Pablo Matera		(substituted off) 24'	(substituted on) 35'	(substituted off) 56'
RL	5	Pedro Rubiolo
LL	4	Guido Petti		(substituted off) 51'
TP	3	Joel Sclavi		(substituted off) 46'
HK	2	Julián Montoya (c)	(yellow card) 2'			(substituted off) 62'
LP	1	Thomas Gallo		(substituted off) 70'
Substitutions:
HK	16	Ignacio Ruiz		(substituted on) 5'	(substituted off) 14'	(substituted on) 62'
PR	17	Ignacio Calles		(substituted on) 70'
PR	18	Francisco Gómez Kodela		(substituted on) 46'
LK	19	Franco Molina		(substituted on) 51'
FL	20	Marcos Kremer		(substituted on) 24'	(substituted off) 35'	(substituted on) 56'
SH	21	Lautaro Bazán		(substituted on) 56'
FH	22	Santiago Carreras		(substituted on) 51'
WG	23	Mateo Carreras		(substituted on) 27'
Coach:
(Argentina) Felipe Contepomi

Player of the Match:
Louis Bielle-Biarrey (France)

Assistant referees:
Andrea Piardi (Italy)
Morné Ferreira (South Africa)
Television match official:
Ian Tempest (England)
Foul play review officer:
Olly Hodges (Ireland)

Notes:

- Marko Gazzotti (France) made his international debut.

23 November 2024
12:45 CET (UTC+1)

Spain	23–26	United States
Try: Saleta 11' c Nieto 61' m Cian 69' m Con: Vinuesa (1/3) 12'; Pen: Vinuesa (2/2) 17', 51'	Report	Try: Augspurger 21' c Lopeti (2) 31' c, 55' c O'Keeffe 45' m Con: MacGinty (3/4) 22', 32', 56'

Estadio Nacional Complutense, Madrid
Referee: Saba Abulashvili (Georgia)

Team details

FB	15	Alberto Carmona
RW	14	Gauthier Minguillón
OC	13	Alejandro Alonso	(substituted off) 46'
IC	12	Álvar Gimeno
LW	11	Martiniano Cian
FH	10	Gonzalo Vinuesa
SH	9	Estanislao Bay	(substituted off) 46'
N8	8	Raphaël Nieto
OF	7	Alex Saleta	(substituted off) 56'
BF	6	Ignacio Piñeiro (c)
RL	5	Asier Usárraga
LL	4	Brice Ferrer	(substituted off) 56'
TP	3	Lucas Santamaría	(substituted off) 56'
HK	2	Santiago Ovejero	(substituted off) 70'
LP	1	Bernardo Vázquez	(substituted off) 52'
Replacements:
HK	16	Vicente Del Hoyo	(substituted on) 70'
PR	17	Thierry Futeu	(substituted on) 52'
PR	18	Hugo González	(substituted on) 56'
LK	19	Matheo Triki	(substituted on) 56'
FL	20	Ekain Imaz	(substituted on) 56'
SH	21	Kerman Aurrekoetxea	(substituted on) 46'
FH	22	Gonzalo López-Bontempo	(substituted on) 46'
CE	23	Pau Aira
Coach:
(Argentina) Pablo Bouza

FB	15	Erich Storti
RW	14	Mark O'Keeffe		(substituted off) 62'
OC	13	Dominic Besag
IC	12	Tavite Lopeti
LW	11	Nate Augspurger
FH	10	AJ MacGinty
SH	9	Ruben de Haas		(substituted off) 66'
N8	8	Paddy Ryan
OF	7	Cory Daniel	(yellow card) 51'
BF	6	Vili Helu		(substituted off) 70'
RL	5	Greg Peterson (c)	(yellow card) 7'
LL	4	Jason Damm
TP	3	Paul Mullen		(substituted off) 53'
HK	2	Kapeli Pifeleti		(substituted off) 78'
LP	1	Jake Turnbull		(substituted off) 53'
Replacements:
HK	16	Sean McNulty		(substituted on) 78'
PR	17	Jack Iscaro		(substituted on) 53'
PR	18	Pono Davis		(substituted on) 53'
LK	19	Tomás Casares		(substituted on) 70'
FL	20	Moni Tonga'uiha
SH	21	Ethan McVeigh		(substituted on) 66'
WG	22	Noah Brown		(substituted on) 62'
FH	23	Luke Carty
Coach:
(United States) Scott Lawrence

Assistant referees:
Evan Urruzmendi (France)
Kévin Bralley (France)
Television match official:
Tom Spurrier (Wales)

Notes:

- Hugo Pirlet (Spain) was a late withdrawal, with Hugo González taking his place to make his international debut.
- Noah Brown (United States) made his international debut.
- With this win, United States went unbeaten on an autumn European tour for the first time since 2013.

23 November 2024
15:10 WET (UTC+0)

Ireland	52–17	Fiji
Try: Doris 4' c van der Flier 14' c Casey 29' c Hansen (2) 40+1' c, 67' m Aki 46' c G. McCarthy 63' c Kelleher 78' m Con: S. Prendergast (5/7) 5', 30', 40+2', 47', 64'; Casey (1/1) 15'	Report	Try: Salawa 54' c Turagacoke 65' c Con: Muntz (2/2) 55', 66'; Pen: Muntz (1/1) 17'

Aviva Stadium, Dublin
Attendance: 51,700
Referee: Hollie Davidson (Scotland)

Team details

FB	15	Jamie Osborne		(substituted off) 27'
RW	14	Mack Hansen
OC	13	Robbie Henshaw		(substituted off) 47'
IC	12	Bundee Aki		(substituted off) 73'
LW	11	Jacob Stockdale		(substituted off) 49'
FH	10	Sam Prendergast	(yellow card) 7'
SH	9	Craig Casey
N8	8	Caelan Doris (c)
OF	7	Josh van der Flier		(substituted off) 47'
BF	6	Cormac Izuchukwu		(substituted off) 50'
RL	5	Tadhg Beirne
LL	4	Joe McCarthy
TP	3	Finlay Bealham		(substituted off) 47'
HK	2	Gus McCarthy
LP	1	Andrew Porter		(substituted off) 47'
Substitutions:
HK	16	Rónan Kelleher		(substituted on) 73'
PR	17	Tom O'Toole		(substituted on) 47'
PR	18	Tom Clarkson		(substituted on) 47'
LK	19	Iain Henderson		(substituted on) 50'
FL	20	Cian Prendergast		(substituted on) 47'
SH	21	Conor Murray		(substituted on) 49'
FH	22	Ciarán Frawley		(substituted on) 27'
CE	23	Stuart McCloskey		(substituted on) 47'
Coach:
(England) Andy Farrell

FB	15	Vuate Karawalevu
RW	14	Jiuta Wainiqolo
OC	13	Waisea Nayacalevu (c)		(substituted off) 60'
IC	12	Josua Tuisova
LW	11	Ponepati Loganimasi		(substituted off) 55'
FH	10	Caleb Muntz
SH	9	Frank Lomani		(substituted off) 22'
N8	8	Elia Canakaivata
OF	7	Kitione Salawa		(substituted off) 22'	(substituted on) 28'
BF	6	Meli Derenalagi		(substituted off) 58'
RL	5	Temo Mayanavanua		(substituted off) 58'
LL	4	Mesake Vocevoce
TP	3	Luke Tagi		(substituted off) 40'
HK	2	Tevita Ikanivere		(substituted off) 50'
LP	1	Eroni Mawi	(yellow card) 18'			(substituted off) 50'
Substitutions:
HK	16	Sam Matavesi		(substituted on) 50'
PR	17	Haereiti Hetet		(substituted on) 22'	(substituted off) 28'	(substituted on) 50'
PR	18	Samu Tawake		(substituted on) 40'
LK	19	Setareki Turagacoke	(yellow card) 67'	(substituted on) 58'
FL	20	Albert Tuisue		(substituted on) 58'
SH	21	Peni Matawalu		(substituted on) 22'
FH	22	Vilimoni Botitu		(substituted on) 60'
CE	23	Sireli Maqala		(substituted on) 55'
Coach:
(Australia) Mick Byrne

Player of the Match:
Bundee Aki (Ireland)

Assistant referees:
Matthew Carley (England)
Sam Grove-White (Scotland)
Television match official:
Mike Adamson (Scotland)
Foul play review officer:
Andrew McMenemy (Scotland)

Notes:

- Cormac Izuchukwu and Gus McCarthy (both Ireland) made their international debuts.

23 November 2024
18:00 EET (UTC+2)

Romania	21–23	Uruguay
Try: Butnariu 18' c Sikuea 69' m Con: Rupanu (1/2) 19'; Pen: Rupanu (3/4) 12', 30', 47'	Report	Try: Mieres 9' c I. Álvarez 57' c Con: S. Álvarez (2/2) 9', 57'; Pen: S. Álvarez (3/4) 5', 14', 78'

Stadionul Arcul de Triumf, Bucharest
Referee: Adam Leal (England)

Team details

FB	15	Paul Popoaia
RW	14	Talia'uli Sikuea
OC	13	Mihai Graure
IC	12	Taylor Gontineac	(yellow card) 40'
LW	11	Tevita Manumua
FH	10	Hinckley Vaovasa
SH	9	Gabriel Rupanu		(substituted off) 62'
N8	8	Adrian Mitu
OF	7	Vlad Neculau (c)		(substituted off) 54'
BF	6	Cristi Boboc		(substituted off) 75'
RL	5	Andrei Mahu		(substituted off) 62'
LL	4	Yanis Horvat		(substituted off) 22'	(substituted on) 31'	(substituted off) 54'
TP	3	Gheorghe Gajion		(substituted off) 62'
HK	2	Tudor Butnariu		(substituted off) 45'
LP	1	Alexandru Savin	(yellow card) 21'			(substituted off) 65'
Replacements:
HK	16	Ștefan Buruiană		(substituted on) 45'
PR	17	Ciprian Chiriac		(substituted on) 22'	(substituted off) 31'	(substituted on) 65'
PR	18	Vasile Balan		(substituted on) 62'
LK	19	Marius Iftimiciuc		(substituted on) 62'
FL	20	Matthew Tweddle				(substituted on) 54'
FL	21	Kemal Altinok		(substituted on) 54'
SH	22	Alin Conache		(substituted on) 62'
CE	23	Fonovai Tangimana		(substituted on) 75'
Coach:
(France) David Gérard

FB	15	Juan González	(substituted off) 22'
RW	14	Gastón Mieres	(substituted off) 65'
OC	13	Felipe Arcos Pérez
IC	12	Joaquín Suárez
LW	11	Bautista Basso	(substituted off) 51'
FH	10	Ícaro Amarillo
SH	9	Santiago Álvarez
N8	8	Manuel Diana	(substituted off) 50'
OF	7	Lucas Bianchi
BF	6	Santiago Civetta
RL	5	Manuel Leindekar (c)
LL	4	Felipe Aliaga
TP	3	Ignacio Péculo	(substituted off) 79'
HK	2	Guillermo Pujadas	(substituted off) 75'
LP	1	Mateo Sanguinetti	(substituted off) 59'
Replacements:
HK	16	Joaquín Myszka	(substituted on) 75'
PR	17	Diego Arbelo	(substituted on) 79'
PR	18	Mateo Perillo	(substituted on) 59'
LK	19	Ignacio Dotti
N8	20	Carlos Deus	(substituted on) 50'
SH	21	Ignacio Álvarez	(substituted on) 22'
WG	22	Mateo Viñals	(substituted on) 51'
WG	23	Ignacio Facciolo	(substituted on) 65'
Coach:
(Argentina) Rodolfo Ambrosio

Assistant referees:
Hamish Smales (England)
John Meredith (England)
Television match official:
Adam Jones (Wales)

Notes:

- Kemal Altinok and Matthew Tweddle (both Romania) made their international debuts.

23 November 2024
17:40 GMT (UTC+0)

Wales	12–45	South Africa
Try: Dyer 40' m Botham 79' c Con: B. Thomas (1/1) 80'	Report	Try: Mostert 5' c Etzebeth 8' m Arendse 18' c Louw 33' c Fassi 53' m Steenekamp 61' c Jo. Hendrikse 75' c Con: Jo. Hendrikse (5/7) 6', 19', 34', 62', 76'

Principality Stadium, Cardiff
Attendance: 67,236
Referee: Karl Dickson (England)

Team details

FB	15	Blair Murray
RW	14	Josh Hathaway
OC	13	Max Llewellyn	(substituted off) 56'
IC	12	Ben Thomas
LW	11	Rio Dyer
FH	10	Sam Costelow	(substituted off) 9'	(substituted on) 20'	(substituted off) 40'
SH	9	Ellis Bevan	(substituted off) 56'
N8	8	Taine Plumtree	(substituted off) 47'
OF	7	Jac Morgan
BF	6	James Botham
RL	5	Christ Tshiunza
LL	4	Will Rowlands	(substituted off) 55'
TP	3	Archie Griffin	(substituted off) 35'
HK	2	Dewi Lake (c)	(substituted off) 59'
LP	1	Nicky Smith	(substituted off) 71'
Replacements:
HK	16	Ryan Elias	(substituted on) 59'
PR	17	Kemsley Mathias	(substituted on) 71'
PR	18	Keiron Assiratti	(substituted on) 35'
LK	19	Freddie Thomas	(substituted on) 47'
FL	20	Tommy Reffell	(substituted on) 55'
SH	21	Rhodri Williams	(substituted on) 56'
CE	22	Eddie James	(substituted on) 9'	(substituted off) 20'	(substituted on) 40'
CE	23	Owen Watkin	(substituted on) 56'
Coach:
(New Zealand) Warren Gatland

FB	15	Aphelele Fassi
RW	14	Cheslin Kolbe
OC	13	Jesse Kriel
IC	12	Damian de Allende	(substituted off) 50'
LW	11	Kurt-Lee Arendse
FH	10	Jordan Hendrikse
SH	9	Jaden Hendrikse	(substituted off) 60'
N8	8	Jasper Wiese	(substituted off) 60'
BF	7	Elrigh Louw	(substituted off) 41'
OF	6	Siya Kolisi (c)
RL	5	Franco Mostert
LL	4	Eben Etzebeth	(substituted off) 29'
TP	3	Wilco Louw	(substituted off) 45'
HK	2	Johan Grobbelaar	(substituted off) 45'
LP	1	Thomas du Toit	(substituted off) 45'
Substitutions:
HK	16	Malcolm Marx	(substituted on) 45'
PR	17	Gerhard Steenekamp	(substituted on) 45'
PR	18	Vincent Koch	(substituted on) 45'
FL	19	Marco van Staden	(substituted on) 60'
LK	20	RG Snyman	(substituted on) 29'
FL	21	Cameron Hanekom	(substituted on) 41'
SH	22	Cobus Reinach	(substituted on) 60'
FH	23	Handré Pollard	(substituted on) 50'
Coach:
(South Africa) Rassie Erasmus

Player of the Match:
Franco Mostert (South Africa)

Assistant referees:
Christophe Ridley (England)
Damian Schneider (Argentina)
Television match official:
Andrew Jackson (England)
Foul play review officer:
Stuart Terheege (England)

Notes:

- South Africa retained the Prince William Cup.
- With this loss, Wales went winless in a single calendar year for the first time since 1937. They also become the second tier one nation, after Italy in 2020, to lose all their Tests in a single calendar year in the professional era.
- Freddie Thomas (Wales) and Cameron Hanekom (South Africa) made their international debuts.
- Gareth Thomas and Tom Rogers (Wales) were originally named to start at loosehead prop and right wing, but withdrew on the day of the match due to illness and injury, respectively. They were replaced by Nicky Smith and Josh Hathaway, whose places on the bench were taken by Kemsley Mathias and Owen Watkin.
- Ox Nché (South Africa) was originally named to start at loosehead prop, but the Springboks later revised their starting line-up. He was replaced by Thomas du Toit, who shifted across from the tighthead position, which was, in turn, taken by Wilco Louw.
- Jean Kleyn (South Africa) was originally named to start at lock, but withdrew prior to the match due to injury. He was replaced by Eben Etzebeth, whose place on the bench was taken by Marco van Staden.

23 November 2024
18:00 GMT (UTC+0)

Scotland A	19–17	Chile
Try: Reed 2' m Dodd 55' c Penalty try 71'; Con: Thompson (1/2) 56'	Report	Try: Strabucchi 29' c N. Garafulic 80' c Con: Videla (1/1) 30'; M. Garafulic (1/1) 80'; Pen: Videla (1/) 56'

Hive Stadium, Edinburgh
Referee: Gianluca Gnecchi (Italy)

Team details

FB	15	Arron Reed
RW	14	Matt Currie
OC	13	Mosese Tuipulotu
IC	12	Stafford McDowall (c)	(yellow card) 33'	(substituted off) 42'
LW	11	Ross McCann		(substituted off) 71'
FH	10	Ross Thompson		(substituted off) 57'
SH	9	Jamie Dobie
N8	8	Ben Muncaster		(substituted off) 62'
OF	7	Freddy Douglas
BF	6	Tom Dodd
RL	5	Ewan Johnson
LL	4	Marshall Sykes		(substituted off) 69'
TP	3	D'Arcy Rae		(substituted off) 4'	(substituted on) 23'	(substituted off) 69'
HK	2	Gregor Hiddleston		(substituted off) 62'
LP	1	Jamie Bhatti		(substituted off) 69'
Substitutions:
HK	16	Harri Morris		(substituted on) 61'
PR	17	Mikey Jones		(substituted on) 69'
PR	18	Fin Richardson		(substituted on) 4'	(substituted off) 23'	(substituted on) 69'
LK	19	Olujare Oguntibeju		(substituted on) 69'
FL	20	Liam McConnell		(substituted on) 62'
SH	21	Ben Afshar		(substituted on) 42'
FH	22	Ben Healy		(substituted on) 57'
FB	23	Jack Brown		(substituted on) 71'
Coach:
(Scotland) Peter Horne

FB	15	Lucas Strabucchi
RW	14	Cristóbal Game		(substituted off) 65'
OC	13	Domingo Saavedra
IC	12	Santiago Videla		(substituted off) 75'
LW	11	Matías Garafulic
FH	10	Juan Cruz Reyes		(substituted off) 68'
SH	9	Benjamín Videla		(substituted off) 68'
N8	8	Alfonso Escobar
OF	7	Clemente Saavedra		(substituted off) 33'
BF	6	Martín Sigren (c)
RL	5	Bruno Sáez
LL	4	Santiago Pedrero
TP	3	Iñaki Gurruchaga		(substituted off) 57'
HK	2	Diego Escobar		(substituted off) 57'
LP	1	Javier Carrasco		(substituted off) 70'
Replacements:
HK	16	Augusto Böhme		(substituted on) 57'
PR	17	Norman Aguayo		(substituted on) 70'
PR	18	Matías Dittus		(substituted on) 57'
FL	19	Raimundo Martínez	(yellow card) 71'	(substituted on) 33'
FL	20	Ernesto Tchimin		(substituted on) 75'
SH	21	Marcelo Torrealba		(substituted on) 68'
FH	22	Rodrigo Fernández		(substituted on) 68'
WG	23	Nicolás Garafulic		(substituted on) 65'
Coach:
(Uruguay) Pablo Lemoine

Player of the Match:
Freddy Douglas (Scotland A)

Assistant referees:
Federico Vedovelli (Italy)
Franco Rosella (Italy)
Television match official:
Matteo Liperini (Italy)

23 November 2024
21:10 CET (UTC+1)

Italy	11–29	New Zealand
Try: Menoncello 75' m Pen: P. Garbisi (2/2) 11', 15'	Report	Try: Roigard 23' c Jordan 38' c Tele'a 69' c B. Barrett 78' m Con: B. Barrett (3/4) 24', 39', 70'; Pen: B. Barrett (1/1) 14'

Allianz Stadium, Torino
Attendance: 40,732
Referee: Pierre Brousset (France)

Team details

FB	15	Ange Capuozzo			(substituted off) 66'	(substituted on) 77'
RW	14	Jacopo Trulla		(substituted off) 71'
OC	13	Ignacio Brex (c)
IC	12	Tommaso Menoncello
LW	11	Monty Ioane
FH	10	Paolo Garbisi		(substituted off) 77'
SH	9	Martin Page-Relo		(substituted off) 54'
N8	8	Ross Vintcent
OF	7	Manuel Zuliani		(substituted off) 68'
BF	6	Sebastian Negri
RL	5	Dino Lamb			(substituted off) 65'	(substituted on) 74'
LL	4	Federico Ruzza		(substituted off) 51'	(substituted on) 65'	(substituted off) 74'
TP	3	Marco Riccioni		(substituted off) 43'	(substituted on) 66'	(substituted off) 77'
HK	2	Gianmarco Lucchesi		(substituted off) 51'
LP	1	Danilo Fischetti		(substituted off) 61'
Replacements:
HK	16	Giacomo Nicotera		(substituted on) 51'
PR	17	Mirco Spagnolo		(substituted on) 61'
PR	18	Simone Ferrari	(yellow card) 65'	(substituted on) 43'
LK	19	Niccolò Cannone		(substituted on) 51'
FL	20	Alessandro Izekor		(substituted on) 68'
SH	21	Alessandro Garbisi		(substituted on) 54'
FH	22	Leonardo Marin		(substituted on) 77'
CE	23	Marco Zanon		(substituted on) 71'
Coach:
(Argentina) Gonzalo Quesada

FB	15	Will Jordan
RW	14	Mark Tele'a
OC	13	Rieko Ioane
IC	12	Anton Lienert-Brown	(yellow card) 49'	(substituted off) 61'
LW	11	Caleb Clarke		(substituted off) 61'
FH	10	Beauden Barrett
SH	9	Cam Roigard		(substituted off) 57'
N8	8	Ardie Savea
OF	7	Sam Cane		(substituted off) 66'
BF	6	Wallace Sititi
RL	5	Patrick Tuipulotu		(substituted off) 51'
LL	4	Scott Barrett (c)	(yellow card) 18'
TP	3	Tyrel Lomax		(substituted off) 54'
HK	2	Codie Taylor		(substituted off) 50'
LP	1	Ethan de Groot		(substituted off) 50'
Substitutions:
HK	16	Asafo Aumua		(substituted on) 50'
PR	17	Ofa Tu'ungafasi		(substituted on) 50'
PR	18	Fletcher Newell		(substituted on) 54'
LK	19	Tupou Vaa'i		(substituted on) 51'
FL	20	Peter Lakai		(substituted on) 66'
SH	21	TJ Perenara		(substituted on) 57'
CE	22	David Havili		(substituted on) 51'
FH	23	Damian McKenzie		(substituted on) 61'
Coach:
(New Zealand) Scott Robertson

Player of the Match:
Will Jordan (New Zealand)

Assistant referees:
Nika Amashukeli (Georgia)
Ludovic Cayre (France)
Television match official:
Tual Trainini (France)
Foul play review officer:
Eric Gauzins (France)

24 November 2024
13:40 GMT (UTC+0)

Scotland	27–13	Australia
Try: Tuipulotu 32' c van der Merwe 51'; Bayliss 67' m Russell 71' m Con: Russell (2/4) 33', 52'; Pen: Russell (1/2) 43'	Report	Try: Potter 75' c Con: Donaldson (1/1) 76'; Pen: Lolesio (2/2) 22', 45'

Murrayfield Stadium, Edinburgh
Attendance: 67,144
Referee: Chris Busby (Ireland)

Team details

FB	15	Blair Kinghorn
RW	14	Darcy Graham
OC	13	Huw Jones
IC	12	Sione Tuipulotu (c)
LW	11	Duhan van der Merwe
FH	10	Finn Russell
SH	9	Ben White	(substituted off) 64'
N8	8	Matt Fagerson
OF	7	Rory Darge	(substituted off) 64'
BF	6	Jamie Ritchie
RL	5	Scott Cummings
LL	4	Grant Gilchrist	(substituted off) 72'
TP	3	Zander Fagerson	(substituted off) 72'
HK	2	Ewan Ashman	(substituted off) 61'
LP	1	Pierre Schoeman	(substituted off) 61'
Substitutions:
HK	16	Dylan Richardson	(substituted on) 61'
PR	17	Rory Sutherland	(substituted on) 61'
PR	18	Will Hurd	(substituted on) 72'
LK	19	Alex Craig	(substituted on) 72'
N8	20	Josh Bayliss	(substituted on) 64'
SH	21	George Horne	(substituted on) 64'
FH	22	Tom Jordan
WG	23	Kyle Rowe
Coach:
(Scotland) Gregor Townsend

FB	15	Tom Wright
RW	14	Andrew Kellaway
OC	13	Joseph Sua'ali'i	(substituted off) 30'
IC	12	Len Ikitau
LW	11	Harry Potter
FH	10	Noah Lolesio	(substituted off) 72'
SH	9	Jake Gordon	(substituted off) 61'
N8	8	Harry Wilson (c)
OF	7	Carlo Tizzano
BF	6	Rob Valetini	(substituted off) 64'
RL	5	Will Skelton	(substituted off) 50'
LL	4	Lukhan Salakaia-Loto
TP	3	Allan Alaalatoa	(substituted off) 52'
HK	2	Brandon Paenga-Amosa	(substituted off) 52'
LP	1	Angus Bell	(substituted off) 52'
Replacements:
HK	16	Billy Pollard	(substituted on) 52'
PR	17	Isaac Kailea	(substituted on) 52'
PR	18	Zane Nonggorr	(substituted on) 52'
LK	19	Nick Frost	(substituted on) 50'
FL	20	Langi Gleeson	(substituted on) 64'
SH	21	Tate McDermott	(substituted on) 61'
FH	22	Ben Donaldson	(substituted on) 72'
WG	23	Max Jorgensen	(substituted on) 30'
Coach:
(New Zealand) Joe Schmidt

Player of the Match:
Blair Kinghorn (Scotland)

Assistant referees:
Andrew Brace (Ireland)
Eoghan Cross (Ireland)
Television match official:
Ben Whitehouse (Wales)
Foul play review officer:
Matteo Liperini (Italy)

Notes:

- Scotland regained the Hopetoun Cup.
- With this win, Scotland set a new national record for most test match wins in a single calendar year (nine).
- Harry Potter (Australia) made his international debut.
- Matt Fagerson (Scotland) earned his 50th test cap.
- Duhan van der Merwe scored his 30th international try, reclaiming the record of top try scorer for Scotland.
- Matt Faessler and Jeremy Williams (Australia) were originally named to start at hooker and lock, but withdrew prior to the match due to injury and illness, respectively. They were replaced by Brandon Paenga-Amosa and Lukhan Salakaia-Loto, whose places on the bench were taken by Billy Pollard and Nick Frost.

24 November 2024
18:00 GST (UTC+4)

Georgia	22–7	Tonga
Try: Todua 41' c Penalty try 61'; Tabutsadze 72' m Con: Matkava (1/2) 42'; Pen: Matkava (1/1) 68'		Try: Ahokovi 80' c Con: Havili (1/1) 80'

Mikheil Meskhi Stadium, Tbilisi
Referee: Jeremy Rozier (France)

Team details

FB	15	Davit Niniashvili
RW	14	Aka Tabutsadze
OC	13	Giorgi Kveseladze
IC	12	Tornike Kakhoidze
LW	11	Alexander Todua
FH	10	Luka Matkava
SH	9	Vasil Lobzhanidze (c)
N8	8	Tornike Jalaghonia
OF	7	Beka Saghinadze
BF	6	Luka Ivanishvili
RL	5	Lado Chachanidze
LL	4	Mikheil Babunashvili
TP	3	Irakli Aptsiauri
HK	2	Vano Karkadze
LP	1	Giorgi Akhaladze
Substitutions:
HK	16	Luka Nioradze	(red card) 75'
PR	17	Giorgi Mamaiashvili	(yellow card) 56'
PR	18	Luka Japaridze
LK	19	Giorgi Javakhia
FL	20	Ilia Spanderashvili
SH	21	Sandro Mamamtavrishvili
FH	22	Gela Aprasidze
CE	23	Georges Shvelidze
Coach:
(England) Richard Cockerill

FB	15	Josiah Unga
RW	14	Taniela Filimone
OC	13	Tima Fainga’anuku
IC	12	Fetuli Paea
LW	11	John Tapueluelu
FH	10	William Havili	(yellow card) 61'
SH	9	Siaosi Nginingini
N8	8	Lotu Inisi
OF	7	Sione Havili Talitui
BF	6	Semisi Paea
RL	5	Justin Mataele
LL	4	Kelemete Finau-Fetuli
TP	3	Ben Tameifuna (c)
HK	2	Sam Moli
LP	1	Salesi Tuifua
Replacements:
HK	16	Sekope Lopeti-Moli
PR	17	Tau Koloamatangi
PR	18	Paula Latu
FL	19	Tevita Ahokovi
FL	20	Tupou Afungia
SH	21	Johnny Ika
FH	22	Patrick Pellegrini
WG	23	Lolesio Sailosi
Coach:
(Tonga) Tevita Tu'ifua

Assistant referees:
Aimee Barrett-Theron (South Africa)
Shota Tevzadze (Georgia)
Television match official:
Mark Patton (Ireland)

24 November 2024
16:10 GMT (UTC+0)

England	59–14	Japan
Try: Earl 8' c Underhill 13' c George (2) 22' c, 30' c Sleightholme 36' c Furbank 53' m Cowan-Dickie (2) 59' m, 64' c Roebuck 68' c Con: M. Smith (7/9) 9', 14', 23', 31', 37', 65', 69'	Report	Try: Saitō 33' c Himeno 61' c Con: Saitō (1/1) 33'; Matsunaga (1/1) 62'

Allianz Stadium, London
Referee: Craig Evans (Wales)

Team details

FB	15	George Furbank	(substituted off) 54'
RW	14	Tommy Freeman
OC	13	Ollie Lawrence
IC	12	Henry Slade	(substituted off) 60'
LW	11	Ollie Sleightholme
FH	10	Marcus Smith
SH	9	Jack van Poortvliet	(substituted off) 47'
N8	8	Ben Earl
OF	7	Sam Underhill	(substituted off) 14'
BF	6	Tom Curry
RL	5	George Martin	(substituted off) 66'
LL	4	Maro Itoje
TP	3	Will Stuart	(substituted off) 54'
HK	2	Jamie George (c)	(substituted off) 47'
LP	1	Ellis Genge	(substituted off) 52'
Substitutions:
HK	16	Luke Cowan-Dickie	(substituted on) 47'
PR	17	Fin Baxter	(substituted on) 52'
PR	18	Asher Opoku-Fordjour	(substituted on) 54'
LK	19	Nick Isiekwe	(substituted on) 66'
FL	20	Chandler Cunningham-South	(substituted on) 14'
SH	21	Harry Randall	(substituted on) 47'
FH	22	Fin Smith	(substituted on) 54'
WG	23	Tom Roebuck	(substituted on) 60'
Coach:
(England) Steve Borthwick

FB	15	Takurō Matsunaga
RW	14	Tomoki Osada	(substituted off) 63'
OC	13	Dylan Riley
IC	12	Siosaia Fifita
LW	11	Jone Naikabula
FH	10	Nicholas McCurran
SH	9	Naoto Saitō (c)	(substituted off) 60'
N8	8	Faulua Makisi	(substituted off) 47'
OF	7	Kazuki Himeno
BF	6	Kanji Shimokawa	(substituted off) 60'
RL	5	Epineri Uluiviti
LL	4	Sanaila Waqa	(substituted off) 52'
TP	3	Shuhei Takeuchi	(substituted off) 40'
HK	2	Seung-hyuk Lee	(substituted off) 40'
LP	1	Takato Okabe	(substituted off) 60'
Substitutions:
HK	16	Kenta Matsuoka	(substituted on) 40'
PR	17	Yukio Morikawa	(substituted on) 60'
PR	18	Keijiro Tamefusa	(substituted on) 40'
LK	19	Daichi Akiyama	(substituted on) 52'
FL	20	Tevita Tatafu	(substituted on) 60'
FL	21	Ben Gunter	(substituted on) 47'
SH	22	Shinobu Fujiwara	(substituted on) 60'
CE	23	Yusuke Kajimura	(substituted on) 63'
Coach:
(Australia) Eddie Jones

Player of the Match:
Ollie Sleightholme (England)

Assistant referees:
Andrea Piardi (Italy)
Morné Ferreira (South Africa)
Television match official:
Olly Hodges (Ireland)
Foul play review officer:
Mike Adamson (Scotland)

Notes:

- Mamoru Harada (Japan) was originally named to start at hooker, but withdrew prior to the match due to injury. He was replaced by Seung-hyuk Lee, whose place on the bench was taken by Kenta Matsuoka.
- Asher Opoku-Fordjour (England) and Seung-hyuk Lee (Japan) made their international debuts.

=== 30 November ===
30 November 2024
15:10 WET (UTC+0)

Ireland	22–19	Australia
Try: Van der Flier 22' m Doris 49' c G. McCarthy 72' c Con: Prendergast (1/2) 49'; Crowley (1/1) 73'; Pen: Prendergast (1/1) 42'	Report	Try: Jorgensen 18' c Con: Lolesio (1/1) 19'; Pen: Lolesio (4/4) 9', 32', 54', 62'

Aviva Stadium, Dublin
Attendance: 51,700
Referee: Andrea Piardi (Italy)

Team details

FB	15	Hugo Keenan
RW	14	Mack Hansen
OC	13	Robbie Henshaw
IC	12	Bundee Aki	(substituted off) 55'
LW	11	James Lowe
FH	10	Sam Prendergast	(substituted off) 65'
SH	9	Jamison Gibson-Park	(substituted off) 65'
N8	8	Caelan Doris (c)
OF	7	Josh van der Flier
BF	6	Tadhg Beirne
RL	5	James Ryan	(substituted off) 53'
LL	4	Joe McCarthy	(substituted off) 53'
TP	3	Finlay Bealham	(substituted off) 53'
HK	2	Rónan Kelleher	(substituted off) 66'
LP	1	Andrew Porter	(substituted off) 66'
Substitutions:
HK	16	Gus McCarthy	(substituted on) 66'
PR	17	Cian Healy	(substituted on) 66'
PR	18	Tom O'Toole	(substituted on) 53'
LK	19	Iain Henderson	(substituted on) 53'
FL	20	Peter O'Mahony	(substituted on) 53'
SH	21	Craig Casey	(substituted on) 65'
FH	22	Jack Crowley	(substituted on) 65'
CE	23	Garry Ringrose	(substituted on) 55'
Coach:
(England) Andy Farrell

FB	15	Tom Wright
RW	14	Andrew Kellaway	(substituted off) 78'
OC	13	Joseph Sua'ali'i
IC	12	Len Ikitau
LW	11	Max Jorgensen
FH	10	Noah Lolesio	(substituted off) 73'	(substituted on) 76'
SH	9	Jake Gordon	(substituted off) 60'
N8	8	Harry Wilson (c)
OF	7	Fraser McReight
BF	6	Rob Valetini	(substituted off) 73'
RL	5	Jeremy Williams	(substituted off) 59'
LL	4	Nick Frost
TP	3	Taniela Tupou	(substituted off) 45'
HK	2	Brandon Paenga-Amosa	(substituted off) 56'
LP	1	James Slipper	(substituted off) 49'
Replacements:
HK	16	Billy Pollard	(substituted on) 56'
PR	17	Isaac Kailea	(substituted on) 49'
PR	18	Allan Alaalatoa	(substituted on) 45'
LK	19	Lukhan Salakaia-Loto	(substituted on) 59'
FL	20	Langi Gleeson	(substituted on) 73'
SH	21	Tate McDermott	(substituted on) 60'
FH	22	Tane Edmed	(substituted on) 73'	(substituted off) 76'
WG	23	Harry Potter	(substituted on) 78'
Coach:
(New Zealand) Joe Schmidt

Player of the Match:
Caelan Doris (Ireland)

Assistant referees:
Nika Amashukeli (Georgia)
Gianluca Gnecchi (Italy)
Television match official:
Eric Gauzins (France)
Foul play review officer:
Ian Tempest (England)

Notes:

- Cian Healy earned his 134th test cap, to become Ireland's most capped player of all time (surpassing the record previously held by Brian O'Driscoll).
- Angus Bell (Australia) was originally named among the replacements, but he withdrew prior to the match due to illness. He was replaced by Isaac Kailea.
- Tane Edmed (Australia) made his international debut.
- Ireland retained the Lansdowne Cup.

== See also ==
- 2024 mid-year rugby union tests
