= Tevita Tatafu =

Tevita Tatafu may refer to:

- Tevita Tatafu (rugby union, born 1996), Japanese rugby union player
- Tevita Tatafu (rugby union, born 2002), Tongan-born, French rugby union player
