= Luka Nioradze =

Georgian rugby union player

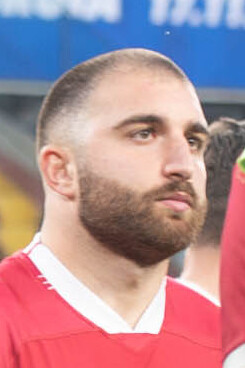
- Born: 6 April 1999 (age 27) Tbilisi, Georgia
- Height: 1.81 m (5 ft 11 in)
- Weight: 108 kg (238 lb; 17 st 0 lb)

Rugby union career
- Position: Hooker
- Current team: Aurillac
Senior career
Years	Team	Apps	(Points)
2019–	Aurillac	128	(100)
- Correct as of 2 March 2024
International career
Years	Team	Apps	(Points)
2017	Georgia U18	5	(5)
2017–2018	Georgia U20	5	(5)
2022–	Georgia	12	(0)
- Correct as of 2 March 2024

Luka Nioradze (Georgian: ლუკა ნიორაძე; born 6 April 1999) is a Georgian professional rugby union player who plays as a hooker for Pro D2 club Aurillac and the Georgia national team.
