= Opeti Helu =

Japan international rugby union player (born 1998)

- Full name: Opeti Helu
- Born: 22 July 1998 (age 28) Tonga
- Height: 1.90 m (6 ft 3 in)
- Weight: 127 kg (20 st 0 lb; 280 lb)

Rugby union career
- Position: Prop
- Current team: Lyon
Senior career
| Years | Team | Apps | (Points) |
| 2019–2026 | Kubota Spears | 78 | (90) |
| 2026− | Lyon | 1 | (0) |
- Correct as of 23 April 2021
International career
| Years | Team | Apps | (Points) |
| 2024– | Japan | 4 | (10) |
- Correct as of 23 April 2021

Opeti Helu (born 22 July 1998) is a professional rugby player who plays as a prop. He currently plays for Kubota Spears in the Japan Rugby League One. He is renowned for his imposing physique, versatility, and scrummaging ability. He plays for Japan through qualification on residency grounds.

== Professional career ==
=== Youth career ===
Originally of Tongan descent, Helu began his career as a schoolboy in Australia. He later attended Newington College for university rugby.

=== Kubota Spears ===
Helu has played with Kubota Spears since 2021. He has become a frequent starter for the team. He was selected in the league's team of the year for the 2023 season.

On 27 April 2024, Helu headbutted another player in a match against Mie Honda Heat, leading to a yellow card issued against him.

In 2025, Helu finished as the runner-up in the voting for the Rugby League One Most Valuable Player for the 2024–25 season.

== International career ==
Helu originally qualified for Japanese selection through his time competing in the country. In October 2024, head coach Eddie Jones selected Helu. He made his debut for the Brave Blossoms later that year, after injuries left many concerned about his ability to play for Japan. He also scored on his debut in the 69th minute.

He is considered one of the country's most promising prospects.

== Playing style ==
Helu stands at 190 cm tall and 127 kg, making him an imposing threat in tackling. He is also known for his abilities in the scrum, and winning possession in the ruck, making him effective in both attack and defense. He was described as Japan's strongest prop by LeadRugby.

== Honors ==
Helu was named in the Japan Rugby League One Team of the Tournament in 2023.
