= Matthew Tweddle =

Romania international rugby union player

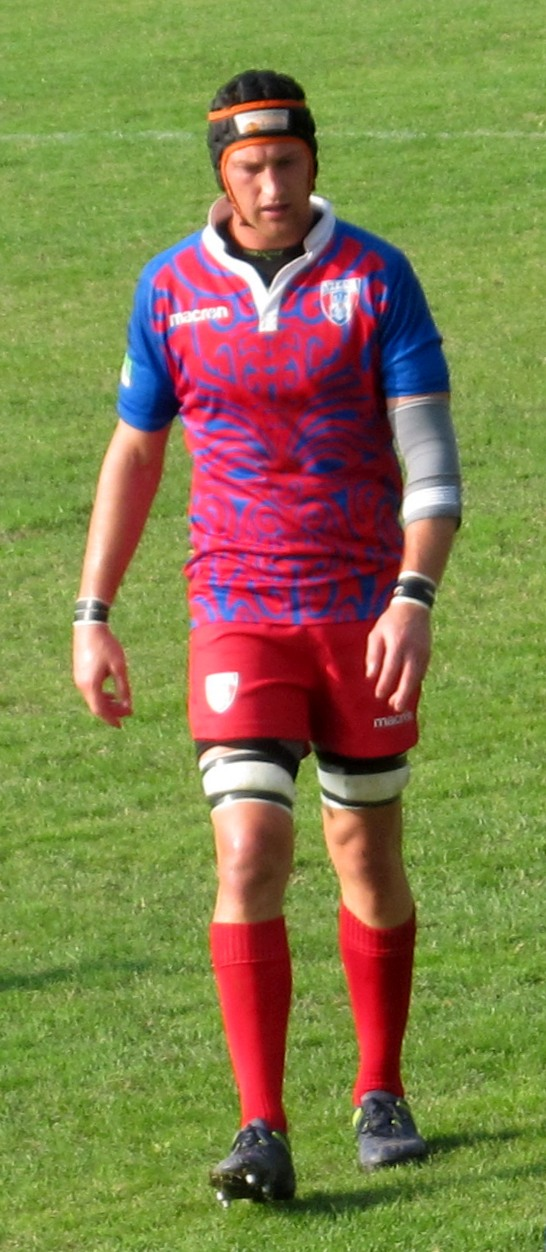
- Matthew Tweddle playing for Steaua in 2019
- Full name: Matthew Devon Tweddle
- Born: 1 July 1992 (age 34) South Africa
- Height: 1.95 m (6 ft 5 in)
- Weight: 110 kg (17 st 5 lb; 240 lb)
- School: Saint Charles College

Rugby union career
- Position: Number 8
- Current team: Steaua
Senior career
Years	Team	Apps	(Points)
2011-2012	Sharks Academy		
2015–16	Falkirk		
2016–17	Boroughmuir		
2011,2012,2013,2015	College Rovers		
2018–19	Tomitanii Constanța	13	(5)
2019–Present	Steaua București	5	(0)
- Correct as of 27 February 2020
- Correct as of 27 February 2020

Matthew Devon Tweddle (born 1 July 1992) is a South African born Irish rugby union football player. He plays as a number 8 for professional SuperLiga club Steaua București.

== Club career ==
Matthew Tweddle played throughout his career at various clubs including NMMU University, college rovers, sharks U21 in South Africa, Garryowen in Ireland, Falkirk and Boroughmuir in Scotland, College Rovers Club championship again in South Africa placing 2nd/ runners up to the trophy. Soon after a move to Romanian SuperLiga followed where he played for Tomitanii Constanța. After just one season he moved to Steaua in Bucharest starting mid 2019 and still applies trade for the superliga giant where he has also won 2 superliga cups and played in numerous league finals. Matthew has recently qualified and played for the Romanian National team in the 2024 Autumn tests and most recently the Rugby Europe championship where the team placed 3rd after beating Portugal 21-7 in a thrilling match.
