= Calixto Martínez =

Cuban journalist

Calixto Martínez Arias is an independent Cuban journalist, who was jailed by the Cuban government from September 16, 2012, to April 9, 2013, without formal charge. He had been reporting about new outbreak of cholera at the east of the island, while the Cuban government officially claimed that after a short summer period in 2012 the illness was already eradicated. He also discovered 5 tons of humanitarian aid sent to Cuba by World Health Organization (WHO), which was left to spoil at Havana's airport.

Martínez was accused of disrespect to former leader of the country Fidel Castro and his brother, president Raúl Castro. He thus faces up to three years in prison, as was pointed out by Reporters without borders.

The Cuban government admitted the outbreak of cholera on the island on July 13, 2012, but already on August 28, 2012 stated the illness was eradicated. 417 cases and 3 fatalities were officially reported. In the middle of January 2013, after the rise of cholera cases in Havana, the government officially acknowledged the illness was back.

At the end of January 2013, Amnesty International named Martínez a prisoner of conscience and called for his immediate release. He was released on April 9, 2013, having never been formally charged.
