= Tevita Manumua =

Tongan rugby union player (born 1993)

Tevita Manumua Laloni
- Born: 12 February 1993 (age 33) Tongatapu, Tonga
- Height: 1.87 m (6 ft 1 1/2 in)
- Weight: 107 kg (16 st 12 lb; 236 lb)

Rugby union career
- Position: Centre
Senior career
Years	Team	Apps	(Points)
2013-2016	Saracens F.C.		
2016-	Timișoara Saracens		
National sevens team
Years	Team		Comps
2019-	Romania 7s		

Tevita Manumua (born 12 February 1993), is a Tongan born Romanian rugby union player who plays as a Centre for CEC Bank SuperLiga club Timișoara Saracens and will make his debut for the Romanian national rugby 7s team.
