= Tevita Tatafu (rugby union, born 2002) =

France international rugby union player

- Born: Tevita Tatafu; 13 October 2002 (age 24) Nukuʻalofa, Tonga
- Height: 1.85 m (6 ft 1 in)
- Weight: 150 kg (23 st 9 lb; 330 lb)
- Notable relative(s): Tevita Tatafu (cousin); Toma Taufa (uncle)

Rugby union career
- Position: Prop
- Current team: Bayonne
Senior career
| Years | Team | Apps | (Points) |
| 2019– | Bayonne | 60 | (10) |
- Correct as of 29 October 2024
International career
| Years | Team | Apps | (Points) |
| 2024– | France | 2 | (0) |
- Correct as of 16 November 2024

Tevita Tatafu (born 13 October 2002) is a Tongan-born, French professional rugby union player. His position is prop and he currently plays for Bayonne in the Top 14.

== International career ==
Tatafu was originally set to participate in France's July 2024 tour against Argentina but had to withdraw due to a regulation issue. Having moved to France in 2019 he became eligible to play for the national team in November 2024. He was named in the France squad for the 2024 autumn nations series and was named in the starting XV to face Japan for the opening game of France's fixtures.

== Honours ==
France

- 1x Six Nations Championship: 2026
