= 2026 World Rugby Nations Cup European-African-Asian Series =

International rugby union tournament

The 2026 World Rugby Nations Cup European-African-Asian Series will be the second phase of matches (rounds 4–6) in the inaugural edition of the World Rugby Nations Cup, the second tier of a biennial international men's rugby union competition, predominantly made of Tier 2 nations from Africa, Americas North, Asia, Europe and Sudamérica.

The European-African-Asian Series will take place between 6 November and 21 November, during the November International window. The matches replaces the traditional tours between the travelling Tier 2 nations from the Pacific Islands and Americas to Europe.

== Championship division: Tables ==
The below shows the tables for the two conferences.

=== Americas-Pacific ===
Pos	Team	Pld	W	D	L	PF	PA	PD	TF	TA	TB	LB	Pts
1	United States (C)	6	5	0	1	181	154	+27	23	21	4	0	24
2	Samoa	6	4	0	2	284	124	+160	42	17	5	1	22
3	Chile	6	4	0	2	182	182	0	23	24	3	0	19
4	Tonga	6	3	0	3	212	202	+10	31	30	5	1	18
5	Canada	6	3	1	2	158	201	−43	22	30	3	0	17
6	Uruguay	6	1	2	3	142	152	−10	21	19	3	3	14

Updated to match(es) played on 21 November 2026. Source: Nations Cup
(C) Champion

=== European-African-Asian ===
Pos	Team	Pld	W	D	L	PF	PA	PD	TF	TA	TB	LB	Pts
1	Georgia (C)	6	6	0	0	275	123	+152	38	18	5	0	29
2	Portugal	6	3	1	2	140	123	+17	21	17	4	1	19
3	Romania	6	1	1	4	183	234	−51	29	33	6	2	14
4	Spain	6	2	1	3	157	217	−60	20	29	2	2	14
5	Hong Kong	6	1	0	5	140	265	−125	17	40	1	1	6
6	Zimbabwe	6	0	0	6	111	187	−76	16	25	2	3	5

Updated to match(es) played on 21 November 2026 (after Hong Kong China vs Tonga). Source: Nations Cup
(C) Champion

== Fixtures ==
European teams will host all of their matches at home. Zimbabwe will host their games in England. Hong Kong will play their first two matches in Europe, with the third (against Tonga) being held in Hong Kong. Confirmation of venues will come in due course for the second leg of matches played in November.

=== Round 4 ===
==== Romania v Tonga ====
6 November 2026
18:30 EET (UTC+02)

(2 BP) Romania	38–43	Tonga (1 BP)
Try: Simionescu 6' c Harțig 26' m Butnariu 37' m Weidner 50' c Gajion (2) 65' c, 80' c Con: Conache (2/4) 7', 51'; Rupanu (2/2) 66', 81'	Report	Try: Poloniati 9' m Filimone 17' c Tapueluelu 20' c Tuitavuki 42' c Ma'afu 56' c Taufa 71' c Con: Pellegrini (5/6) 17', 21', 43', 57', 72'; Pen: Pellegrini (1/1) 41'

Stadionul National Arcul de Triumf, Bucharest
Attendance: 2,000
Referee: Angus Gardner (Australia)

Romania	Tonga

FB	15	Marius Simionescu
RW	14	Tevita Manumua	(substituted off) 57'
OC	13	Nicolas Onuțu
IC	12	Taylor Gontineac
LW	11	Iliesa Tiqe
FH	10	Daniel Plai	(substituted off) 78'
SH	9	Alin Conache	(substituted off) 57'
N8	8	Etienne Terblanche	(substituted off) 53'
OF	7	Keanan Murray
BF	6	Cristi Boboc (c)
RL	5	Adrian Moțoc
LL	4	Logan Weidner	(substituted off) 64'
TP	3	Jean-Pierre Smith	(substituted off) 64'
HK	2	Tudor Butnariu	(substituted off) 78'
LP	1	Iulian Harțig	(substituted off) 53'
Substitutions:
HK	16	Adrian Țală	(substituted on) 78'
PR	17	Alexandru Savin	(substituted on) 53'
PR	18	Gheorghe Gajion	(substituted on) 64'
LK	19	Ștefan Iancu	(substituted on) 64'
BR	20	Adrian Mitu	(substituted on) 53'
SH	21	Gabriel Rupanu	(substituted on) 57'
FH	22	Ștefan Cojocariu	(substituted on) 78'
CE	23	Atila Septar	(substituted on) 57'
Coach:
David Gérard

FB	15	Taniela Filimone
RW	14	John Tapueluelu
OC	13	Fine Inisi	(substituted off) 67'
IC	12	Fetuli Paea (c)
LW	11	Anzelo Tuitavuki	(substituted off) 62'
FH	10	Patrick Pellegrini
SH	9	Siaosi Nginingini	(substituted off) 73'
N8	8	Lotu Inisi	(substituted off) 66'
OF	7	Semisi Paea
BF	6	Sam Tuitupou
RL	5	Justin Mataele	(substituted off) 64'
LL	4	Veikoso Poloniati
TP	3	Paula Latu	(substituted off) 55'
HK	2	Siua Maile	(substituted off) 55'
LP	1	Siegfried Fisiʻihoi	(substituted off) 79'
Substitutions:
HK	16	Efi Ma'afu	(substituted on) 55'
PR	17	Toma'akino Taufa	(substituted on) 55'
PR	18	Phil Kite	(substituted on) 79'
LK	19	Leva Fifita	(substituted on) 64'
BR	20	Otunuku Pauta	(substituted on) 66'
SH	21	Sonatane Takulua	(substituted on) 73'
FH	22	Manu Vunipola	(substituted on) 62'
CE	23	Malakai Fekitoa	(substituted on) 67'
Coach:
Tevita Tuʻifua

Assistant referees:
Saba Abulashvili (Georgia)
Saba Makharadze (Georgia)
Television match official:
Stefano Penne (Italy)

Notes:

- Adrian Țală (Romania), Efi Ma'afu and Manu Vunipola (both Tonga) made their international debuts.
- With this result, and other international results, Romania dropped to 23rd on the World Rugby Rankings, their lowest-ever ranking.

==== Georgia v Canada ====
7 November 2026
18:00 GET (UTC+04)

(1 BP) Georgia	59–14	Canada
Try: Papunashvili 3' m Tabutsadze (2) 20' m, 71' c Niniashvili 31' c Tabatadze 40' c Penalty try 44'; Gigashvili 55' c Kakhoidze 67' c Karkadze 78' c Con: Matkava (6/8) 31', 41', 56', 68', 72', 79'	Report	Try: LeSage 10' c Kelly 26' c Con: McMullin (2/2) 11', 27'

Avchala Rugby Stadium, Tbilisi
Attendance: 1,200
Referee: Gianluca Gnecchi (Italy)

Georgia	Canada

FB	15	Davit Niniashvili (c)	(substituted off) 63'
RW	14	Akaki Tabutsadze
OC	13	Luka Tabatadze
IC	12	Tornike Kakhoidze
LW	11	Dachi Papunashvili
FH	10	Luka Matkava
SH	9	Vasil Lobzhanidze	(substituted off) 56'
N8	8	Beka Shvangiradze	(substituted off) 56'
OF	7	Beka Saghinadze
BF	6	Luka Ivanishvili	(substituted off) 72'
RL	5	Giorgi Javakhia	(substituted off) 56'
LL	4	Lado Chachanidze
TP	3	Bachuki Tchumbadze	(substituted off) 46'
HK	2	Vakhtang Jincharadze	(substituted off) 46'
LP	1	Giorgi Akhaladze	(substituted off) 46'
Substitutions:
HK	16	Vano Karkadze	(substituted on) 46'
PR	17	Sergo Abramishvili	(substituted on) 46'
PR	18	Beka Gigashvili	(substituted on) 46'
LK	19	Gagi Margvelashvili	(substituted on) 56'
BR	20	Mikheil Shioshvili	(substituted on) 72'
BR	21	Ilia Spanderashvili	(substituted on) 56'
SH	22	Gela Aprasidze	(substituted on) 56'
CE	23	Giorgi Shvelidze	(substituted on) 63'
Coach:
Pierre-Henry Broncan

FB	15	Takoda McMullin
RW	14	Kyle Tremblay		(substituted off) 54'
OC	13	Jacob Ince
IC	12	Ben LeSage
LW	11	Nic Benn	(yellow card) 19'
FH	10	Spencer Jones		(substituted off) 70'	(substituted on) 74'
SH	9	Jesse Kilgour		(substituted off) 61'
N8	8	Tyler Ardron
OF	7	Lucas Rumball (c)	(yellow card) 44'	(substituted off) 64'
BF	6	Matt Beukeboom
RL	5	Izzak Kelly		(substituted off) 64'
LL	4	Daragh Doyle
TP	3	Kyle Steeves		(substituted off) 53'
HK	2	Foster DeWitt		(substituted off) 63'
LP	1	Cali Martinez		(substituted off) 53'
Substitutions:
HK	16	Austin Creighton		(substituted on) 63'
PR	17	Sam Miller		(substituted on) 53'
PR	18	Tyler Matchem		(substituted on) 53'
LK	19	Barnaby Waddell		(substituted on) 64'
BR	20	Siôn Parry		(substituted on) 64'
SH	21	Stephen Webb		(substituted on) 61'
FH	22	Jack Gore		(substituted on) 70'
WG	23	Liam James		(substituted on) 54'	(substituted off) 74'
Coach:
Steve Meehan

Assistant referees:
Federico Vedovelli (Italy)
Filippo Russo (Italy)
Television match official:
Stefano Penne (Italy)

Notes:

- Gagi Margvelashvili, Luka Tabatadze (both Georgia) and Jack Gore (Canada) made their international debuts.
- Georgia recorded their largest win over Canada (45-point difference), surpassing the 32-point difference record set in 2017.

==== Portugal v Chile ====
7 November 2026
15:00 WET (UTC+0)

(1 BP) Portugal	36–15	Chile
Try: M. Pinto 8' c Wallis 38' c Storti (2) 57' c, 80+1' c da Cunha 67' m Con: Marques (3/4) 9', 39', 58'; Vareiro (1/1) 80+3'; Pen: Marques (1/2) 30'	Report	Try: Garafulic 6' m Martínez 25' c Con: Garafulic (1/2) 26'; Pen: Garafulic (1/2) 41'

Estádio Nacional, Lisbon
Attendance: 1,500
Referee: Nic Berry (Australia)

Portugal	Chile

FB	15	Manuel Vareiro
RW	14	Raffaele Storti
OC	13	Rodrigo Marta
IC	12	Tomás Appleton
LW	11	Manuel Cardoso Pinto	(substituted off) 60'
FH	10	Domingos Cabral	(substituted off) 41'
SH	9	Samuel Marques	(substituted off) 71'
N8	8	José Monteiro
OF	7	David Wallis	(substituted off) 77'
BF	6	José Madeira (c)
RL	5	Martim Bello
LL	4	Duarte Torgal	(substituted off) 56'
TP	3	António Prim	(substituted off) 50'
HK	2	Nuno Mascarenhas	(substituted off) 50'
LP	1	Abel da Cunha	(substituted off) 27'
Substitutions:
PR	16	Cody Thomas	(substituted on) 27'
HK	17	Luka Begic	(substituted on) 50'
PR	18	Diogo Ferreira	(substituted on) 50'
BR	19	Francisco Almeida	(substituted on) 77'
BR	20	André da Cunha	(substituted on) 56'
SH	21	Hugo Camacho	(substituted on) 71'
WG	22	Simão Bento	(substituted on) 41'
WG	23	Vincent Pinto	(substituted on) 60'
Coach:
Simon Mannix

FB	15	Matías Garafulic	(yellow card) 29'
RW	14	Manuel Bustamante
OC	13	Santiago Videla (c)
IC	12	Domingo Saavedra
LW	11	Felipe Mendez		(substituted off) 51'
FH	10	Rodrigo Fernández		(substituted off) 62'
SH	9	Benjamín Videla		(substituted off) 62'
N8	8	Alfonso Escobar
OF	7	Clemente Saavedra		(substituted off) 70'
BF	6	Raimundo Martínez
RL	5	Javier Eissmann		(substituted off) 45'
LL	4	Santiago Pedrero
TP	3	Iñaki Gurruchaga		(substituted off) 60'
HK	2	Augusto Böhme		(substituted off) 60'
LP	1	Vittorio Lastra		(substituted off) 62'
Substitutions:
HK	16	Norman Aguayo		(substituted on) 62'
PR	17	Benjamín Moreno		(substituted on) 60'
PR	18	Matías Dittus		(substituted on) 60'
LK	19	Bruno Sáez		(substituted on) 70'
BR	20	Ernesto Tchimino		(substituted on) 45'
SH	21	Lucas Berti		(substituted on) 62'
FB	22	Iñaki Ayarza		(substituted on) 51'
WG	23	Clemente Armstrong	(yellow card) 64'	(substituted on) 62'
Coach:
Pablo Lemoine

Assistant referees:
Damon Murphy (Australia)
Ben Connor (Wales)
Television match official:
Aled Griffiths (Wales)

Notes:

- Rodrigo Marta and Manuel Cardoso Pinto (both Portugal) earned their 50th test caps.
- Felipe Mendez and Benjamín Moreno (both Chile) made their international debuts.
- Portugal recorded their largest win over Chile (21-point difference), surpassing the 18-point difference record set in 2005.

==== Spain v Uruguay ====
7 November 2026
16:00 CET (UTC+01)

Spain	18–12	Uruguay (1 BP)
Try: Laforga 22' m Minguillon 75' c Con: Mateu (1/1) 76'; Pen: Mateu (2/2) 9', 55'	Report	Try: Ferrario (2) 11' c, 69' m Con: Amarillo (1/2) 11'

Estadio Nacional Complutense, Madrid
Attendance: 2,000
Referee: Ben O'Keeffe (New Zealand)

Spain	Uruguay

FB	15	JW Bell
RW	14	Martiniano Cian
OC	13	Iñaki Mateu
IC	12	Yago Fernández	(substituted off) 70'
LW	11	Alejandro Laforga
FH	10	Bautista Güemes	(substituted off) 56'
SH	9	Estanislao Bay	(substituted off) 63'
N8	8	Raphael Nieto
OF	7	Manex Ariceta	(substituted off) 51'
BF	6	Matthew Foulds
RL	5	Antonio Suárez
LL	4	Ignacio Piñeiro	(substituted off) 70'
TP	3	Jon Zabala (c)	(substituted off) 63'
HK	2	Santiago Ovejero	(substituted off) 67'
LP	1	Thierry Futeu	(substituted off) 36'
Substitutions:
HK	16	Diego González	(substituted on) 67'
PR	17	Lucas Santamaría	(substituted on) 36'
PR	18	Hugo Pirlet	(substituted on) 63'
BR	19	Vicente Boronat	(substituted on) 70'
BR	20	Gabriel Vélez	(substituted on) 51'
SH	21	Kerman Aurrekoetxea	(substituted on) 63'
CE	22	Oriol Marsinyac	(substituted on) 70'
WG	23	Gauthier Minguillon	(substituted on) 56'
Coach:
Pablo Bouza

FB	15	Ignacio Álvarez Akiki
RW	14	Juan Gonzalez
OC	13	Justo Ferrario
IC	12	Joaquín Súarez	(substituted off) 23'
LW	11	Ignacio Facciolo
FH	10	Ícaro Amarillo
SH	9	Ignacio Rodríguez Bosch	(substituted off) 64'
N8	8	Manuel Diana
OF	7	Lucas Bianchi
BF	6	Manuel Ardao
RL	5	Manuel Leindekar (c)
LL	4	Ignacio Dotti	(substituted off) 55'
TP	3	Reinaldo Piussi	(substituted off) 55'
HK	2	Germán Kessler	(substituted off) 66'
LP	1	Mateo Sanguinetti	(substituted off) 62'
Substitutions:
HK	16	Sebastián Pérez	(substituted on) 66'
PR	17	Mateo Perillo	(substituted on) 62'
PR	18	Ignacio Péculo	(substituted on) 55'
LK	19	Felipe Aliaga	(substituted on) 55'
LK	20	Manuel Rosmarino
BR	21	Mateo Sosa
SH	22	Pedro Hoblog	(substituted on) 64'
CE	23	Alfonso Vidal	(substituted on) 23'
Coach:
Guzmán Barreiro

Assistant referees:
Peter Martin (Ireland)
Robbie Jenkinson (Ireland)
Television match official:
Paulo Duarte (Portugal)

Notes:

- Pedro Hoblog and Sebastián Pérez (both Uruguay) made their international debuts.

==== Zimbabwe v Samoa ====
7 November 2026
15:00 GMT (UTC+00)

Zimbabwe	7–43	Samoa (1 BP)
Try: Lemon 68' c Con: Houston (1/1) 69'	Report	Try: Smiler-Ah Kiong (3) 7' c, 19' m, 45' m Umaga-Jensen 22' c Nee-Nee 42' c Faiʻilagi 54' c Lam 78' m Con: Umaga (3/5) 8', 23', 43'; Ioane (1/2) 55'

Belle Vue, Wakefield (England)
Attendance: 5,000
Referee: Matthew Carley (England)

Zimbabwe	Samoa

FB	15	Jason Robertson
RW	14	Tapiwa Mafura
OC	13	Brandon Mudzekenyedzi
IC	12	Kudzai Mashawi	(substituted off) 56'
LW	11	Edward Sigauke
FH	10	Ian Prior	(substituted off) 47'
SH	9	Hilton Mudariki (c)	(substituted off) 47'
N8	8	Aiden Burnett	(substituted off) 55'
OF	7	Godfrey Muzanargwo
BF	6	Tinotenda Mavesere
RL	5	Gary Porter	(substituted off) 62'
LL	4	Dale Lemon
TP	3	Cleopas Kundiona	(substituted off) 33'
HK	2	Liam Larkan	(substituted off) 69'
LP	1	Victor Mupunga	(substituted off) 64'
Substitutions:
HK	16	Matthew Mandioma	(substituted on) 69'
PR	17	Tjide Visser	(substituted on) 64'
PR	18	Bornwell Gwinji	(substituted on) 33'
LK	19	Daniel Cooke	(substituted on) 62'
BR	20	Tadiwanashe Gwashu	(substituted on) 55'
FH	21	Bruce Houston	(substituted on) 47'
SH	22	Tyrone Gombe	(substituted on) 47'
CE	23	Dion Khumalo	(substituted on) 56'
Coach:
Pieter Benade

FB	15	Shaun Stevenson	(yellow card) 63'
RW	14	Latrell Smiler-Ah Kiong
OC	13	Lalomilo Lalomilo		(substituted off) 55'
IC	12	Peter Umaga-Jensen
LW	11	AJ Lam
FH	10	Jacob Umaga		(substituted off) 52'
SH	9	Connor Tupai		(substituted off) 52'
N8	8	Abraham Papali'i		(substituted off) 52'
OF	7	Niko Jones		(substituted off) 34'	(substituted on) 43'
BF	6	Miracle Faiʻilagi		(substituted off) 59'
RL	5	Theo McFarland (c)
LL	4	Ben Nee-Nee
TP	3	Michael Alaalatoa		(substituted off) 55'
HK	2	Richie Asiata	(yellow card) 32'			(substituted off) 61'
LP	1	Scott Sio		(substituted off) 55'
Substitutions:
HK	16	Sama Malolo		(substituted on) 34'	(substituted off) 43'	(substituted on) 61'
PR	17	Aki Seiuli		(substituted on) 55'
PR	18	Tietie Tuimauga		(substituted on) 55'
LK	19	Chris Gabriel		(substituted on) 59'
BR	20	Alamanda Motuga		(substituted on) 52'
SH	21	Joel Lam		(substituted on) 52'
FH	22	Josh Ioane		(substituted on) 52'
CE	23	Duncan Paia'aua		(substituted on) 55'
Coach:
Tusi Pisi

Assistant referees:
Craig Evans (Wales)
Ben Breakspear (Wales)
Television match official:
Dan Jones (England)

Notes:

- Dale Lemon, Jason Robertson (both Zimbabwe), Chris Gabriel, Josh Ioane, AJ Lam and Shaun Stevenson (all Samoa) made their international debuts.
- This was the first meeting between the two teams.

==== Hong Kong v United States ====
8 November 2026
15:45 CET (UTC+01)

(1 BP) Hong Kong	26–28	United States (1 BP)
Try: Ramage 5' c Bartlett 38' c Con: de Thierry (2/2) 6', 39'; Pen: de Thierry (2/3) 27', 57'; McCann (2/2) 65', 71'	Report	Try: Mayo 10' c Faʻanana-Schultz 19' c Penalty try 59'; Geiger 76' c Con: Hilsenbeck (3/3) 11', 20', 77'

Stade Marcel-Verchère, Bourg-en-Bresse (France)
Attendance: 2,700
Referee: Luc Ramos (France)

Hong Kong	United States

FB	15	Dylan McCann
RW	14	Sebastian Brien
OC	13	Marcus Ramage
IC	12	Isaac Campbell-Wu	(substituted off) 62'
LW	11	Harry Sayers
FH	10	Nathan de Thierry	(substituted off) 59'
SH	9	Jack Combes
N8	8	Joshua Hrstich (c)
OF	7	Callum McCullough	(substituted off) 52'
BF	6	Jack Bartlett
RL	5	Maximilian Murphy	(substituted off) 62'
LL	4	James Rivers
TP	3	Faizal Solomona-Penesa	(substituted off) 52'
HK	2	Alexander Post	(substituted off) 55'
LP	1	Sunia Fameitau	(substituted off) 73'
Substitutions:
HK	16	Harry Baron	(substituted on) 55'
PR	17	Thomas Concu	(substituted on) 73'
PR	18	Keelan Chapman	(substituted on) 52'
LK	19	Lachlan Doheny	(substituted on) 52'
BR	20	Dana Fourie	(substituted on) 52'
SH	21	Eric Chui
FH	22	Joe Barker	(substituted on) 59'
CE	23	Thomas Hill	(substituted on) 62'
Coach:
Andrew Douglas

FB	15	Perry Mayo
RW	14	Rufus McLean
OC	13	Tavite Lopeti
IC	12	Dominic Besag	(substituted off) 55'
LW	11	Noah Brown
FH	10	Christopher Hilsenbeck
SH	9	Oscar Lennon
N8	8	Jamason Faʻanana-Schultz	(substituted off) 45'
OF	7	Makeen Alikhan	(substituted off) 71'
BF	6	Benjamín Bonasso
RL	5	Jason Damm (c)
LL	4	Nathan Den Hoedt
TP	3	Tonga Kofe	(substituted off) 45'
HK	2	Shilo Klein	(substituted off) 57'
LP	1	Payton Telea-Ilalio	(substituted off) 46'
Substitutions:
HK	16	Kaleb Geiger	(substituted on) 57'
PR	17	Ezekiel Lindenmuth	(substituted on) 46'
PR	18	Charlie Abel	(substituted on) 45'
LK	19	Sam Golla	(substituted on) 71'
BR	20	Marno Redelinghuys	(substituted on) 45'
SH	21	Michael Baska	(substituted on) 61'
CE	22	Cassh Maluia	(substituted on) 55'
FH	23	Tom Pittman
Coach:
Scott Lawrence

Assistant referees:
Kevin Bralley (France)
Benoît Rousselet (France)
Television match official:
Dan Jones (England)

Notes:

- Oscar Lennon (United States) made his international debut.

=== Round 5 ===
==== Georgia v Tonga ====
14 November 2026
18:00 GET (UTC+04)

(1 BP) Georgia	55–31	Tonga (1 BP)
Try: Karkadze (2) 25' c, 30' m Lobzhanidze 33' c Niniashvili 49' c Tabutsadze (2) 55' c, 71' m Saghinadze 60' c Aprasidze 79' c Con: Matkava (6/8) 26', 34', 51', 56', 61', 80'; Pen: Matkava (1/1) 3'	Report	Try: Tameifuna 13' c Paea 38' c Tapueluelu 45' c Poloniati 64' m Inisi 74' m Con: Pellegrini (3/3) 14', 39', 46'

Avchala Rugby Stadium, Tbilisi
Attendance: 2,000
Referee: Sam Grove-White (Scotland)

Georgia	Tonga

FB	15	Davit Niniashvili (c)
RW	14	Akaki Tabutsadze	(yellow card) 44'
OC	13	Giorgi Shvelidze
IC	12	Tornike Kakhoidze		(substituted off) 52'	(substituted on) 66'
LW	11	Dachi Papunashvili				(substituted off) 76'
FH	10	Luka Matkava
SH	9	Vasil Lobzhanidze		(substituted off) 66'
N8	8	Beka Gorgadze		(substituted off) 70'
OF	7	Beka Saghinadze
BF	6	Luka Ivanishvili		(substituted off) 61'
RL	5	Kote Mikautadze		(substituted off) 44'
LL	4	Gagi Margvelashvili
TP	3	Bachuki Tchumbadze		(substituted off) 52'
HK	2	Vano Karkadze		(substituted off) 52'
LP	1	Giorgi Akhaladze		(substituted off) 52'
Substitutions:
HK	16	Vakhtang Jincharadze		(substituted on) 52'
PR	17	Nika Abuladze		(substituted on) 52'
PR	18	Beka Gigashvili		(substituted on) 52'
LK	19	Giorgi Javakhia		(substituted on) 44'
BR	20	Mikheil Shioshvili		(substituted on) 70'
BR	21	Beka Shvangiradze		(substituted on) 61'
SH	22	Gela Aprasidze		(substituted on) 66'
CE	23	Luka Tabatadze		(substituted on) 52'	(substituted off) 66'	(substituted on) 76'
Coach:
Pierre-Henry Broncan

FB	15	Taniela Filimone
RW	14	John Tapueluelu
OC	13	Malakai Fekitoa
IC	12	Fetuli Paea	(yellow card) 70'
LW	11	Anzelo Tuitavuki		(substituted off) 70'
FH	10	Patrick Pellegrini	(yellow card) 24'	(substituted off) 57'
SH	9	Siaosi Nginingini		(substituted off) 32'
N8	8	Lotu Inisi
OF	7	Semisi Paea		(substituted off) 57'
BF	6	Sam Tuitupou
RL	5	Leva Fifita		(substituted off) 61'
LL	4	Veikoso Poloniati
TP	3	Ben Tameifuna (c)		(substituted off) 61'
HK	2	Siua Maile		(substituted off) 52'
LP	1	Siegfried Fisiʻihoi		(substituted off) 68'
Substitutions:
HK	16	Efi Ma'afu		(substituted on) 52'
PR	17	Phil Kite		(substituted on) 68'
PR	18	Toma'akino Taufa		(substituted on) 61'
LK	19	Justin Mataele		(substituted on) 61'
BR	20	Sione Vailanu		(substituted on) 57'
SH	21	Sonatane Takulua		(substituted on) 32'
FH	22	Manu Vunipola		(substituted on) 57'
WG	23	Sione Tui		(substituted on) 70'
Coach:
Tevita Tuʻifua

Assistant referees:
Jordan Way (Australia)
Ruairidh Campbell (Scotland)
Television match official:
Paulo Duarte (Portugal)

Notes:

- This was the highest number of points Georgia have scored against Tonga, surpassing the previous record of 28 points set in 1999.
- This was Georgia's largest winning margin over Tonga (24 points), surpassing the previous record of a 15 point margin set in 2024.

==== Hong Kong v Canada ====
14 November 2026
15:00 CET (UTC+01)

Hong Kong	17–38	Canada (1 BP)
Try: Bartlett 23' c Altier 42' c Con: Altier (2/2) 24', 43'; Pen: Altier (1/1) 21'	Report	Try: Benn 35' c Penalty try 52'; Jones 60' c Quattrin 65' m Miller 75' m McMullin 79' c Con: McMullin (3/5) 36', 61', 80'

Chambéry Savoie Stadium, Chambery (France)
Attendance: 3,800
Referee: Jérémy Rozier (France)

Hong Kong	Canada

FB	15	Dylan McCann		(substituted off) 38'	(substituted on) 46'	(substituted off) 58'
RW	14	Paul Altier
OC	13	Marcus Ramage
IC	12	Isaac Campbell-Wu
LW	11	Harry Sayers		(substituted off) 64'
FH	10	Nathan de Thierry
SH	9	Jack Combes		(substituted off) 74'
N8	8	Joshua Hrstich (c)	(yellow card) 62'
OF	7	Dana Fourie		(substituted off) 36'
BF	6	Jack Bartlett		(substituted off) 68'
RL	5	Maximilian Murphy		(substituted off) 52'	(substituted on) 68'
LL	4	James Rivers
TP	3	Faizal Solomona-Penesa	(yellow card) 35'			(substituted off) 57'
HK	2	Alexander Post		(substituted off) 56'
LP	1	Sunia Fameitau		(substituted off) 56'
Substitutions:
HK	16	Harry Baron		(substituted on) 56'
PR	17	Thomas Concu		(substituted on) 56'
PR	18	Keelan Chapman		(substituted on) 38'	(substituted off) 46'	(substituted on) 57'
LK	19	Lachlan Doheny		(substituted on) 52'
BR	20	Callum McCullough		(substituted on) 36'
SH	21	Eric Chui		(substituted on) 74'
FH	22	Joe Barker		(substituted on) 64'
FB	23	Matt Worley				(substituted on) 58'
Coach:
Andrew Douglas

FB	15	Takoda McMullin
RW	14	Demetri Patterson
OC	13	Isaac Olson	(yellow card) 22'	(substituted off) 78'
IC	12	Ben LeSage (c)
LW	11	Nic Benn
FH	10	Spencer Jones		(substituted off) 78'
SH	9	Jesse Kilgour		(substituted off) 41'
N8	8	Tyler Ardron
OF	7	Siôn Parry
BF	6	Matt Beukeboom
RL	5	Evan Olmstead		(substituted off) 47'
LL	4	Daragh Doyle		(substituted off) 74'
TP	3	Kyle Steeves		(substituted off) 61'
HK	2	Andrew Quattrin		(substituted off) 66'
LP	1	Cali Martinez		(substituted off) 61'
Substitutions:
HK	16	Dewald Kotze		(substituted on) 66'
PR	17	Sam Miller		(substituted on) 61'
PR	18	Cole Keith		(substituted on) 61'
LK	19	Izzak Kelly		(substituted on) 74'
BR	20	Matt Oworu		(substituted on) 47'
SH	21	Jason Higgins		(substituted on) 41'
FH	22	Jack Gore		(substituted on) 78'
CE	23	Josh Thiel		(substituted on) 78'
Coach:
Steve Meehan

Assistant referees:
Kevin Bralley (France)
Benoît Rousselet (France)
Television match official:
Julien Castaignède (France)

Notes:

- Demetri Patterson (Canada) made his international debut.

==== Portugal v Samoa ====
14 November 2026
15:00 WET (UTC+0)

Portugal	5–36	Samoa (1 BP)
Try: Cabral 63'	Report	Try: Umaga-Jensen 6' m McFarland (2) 24' c, 73' m Jones 29' c Smiler-Ah Kiong 41' m Faiʻilagi 77' c Con: Umaga (2/5) 25', 30'; Ioane (1/1) 78'

Estádio Nacional, Lisbon
Attendance: 1,000
Referee: Eoghan Cross (Ireland)

Portugal	Samoa

FB	15	Simão Bento	(substituted off) 12'
RW	14	Raffaele Storti
OC	13	Rodrigo Marta
IC	12	Tomás Appleton
LW	11	Vincent Pinto
FH	10	Manuel Vareiro	(substituted off) 51'		(substituted on) 79'
SH	9	Samuel Marques
N8	8	José Monteiro
OF	7	André da Cunha	(substituted off) 47'
BF	6	David Wallis
RL	5	José Madeira (c)
LL	4	Martim Bello	(substituted off) 40'
TP	3	António Prim	(substituted off) 47'
HK	2	Luka Begic	(substituted off) 47'
LP	1	Abel da Cunha	(substituted off) 19'
Substitutions:
PR	16	Cody Thomas	(substituted on) 19'
HK	17	Nuno Mascarenhas	(substituted on) 47'
PR	18	Diogo Ferreira	(substituted on) 47'
LK	19	Duarte Torgal	(substituted on) 40'
BR	20	Nicolas Martins	(substituted on) 47'
SH	21	Hugo Camacho		(substituted on) 57'	(substituted off) 79'
FH	22	Domingos Cabral	(substituted on) 12'
WG	23	Manuel Cardoso Pinto	(substituted on) 51'	(substituted off) 57'
Coach:
Simon Mannix

FB	15	Shaun Stevenson
RW	14	Latrell Smiler-Ah Kiong
OC	13	Lalomilo Lalomilo	(substituted off) 50'
IC	12	Peter Umaga-Jensen	(substituted off) 51'
LW	11	AJ Lam
FH	10	Jacob Umaga
SH	9	Connor Tupai
N8	8	Abraham Papali'i	(substituted off) 41'
OF	7	Niko Jones	(substituted off) 53'
BF	6	Miracle Faiʻilagi
RL	5	Theo McFarland (c)
LL	4	Ben Nee-Nee	(substituted off) 53'
TP	3	Michael Alaalatoa	(substituted off) 53'
HK	2	Richie Asiata	(substituted off) 53'
LP	1	Scott Sio	(substituted off) 53'
Substitutions:
HK	16	Sama Malolo	(substituted on) 53'
PR	17	Aki Seiuli	(substituted on) 53'
PR	18	Tietie Tuimauga	(substituted on) 53'
LK	19	Sam Slade	(substituted on) 53'
BR	20	Akira Ioane	(substituted on) 41'
BR	21	Alamanda Motuga	(substituted on) 53'
SH	22	Joel Lam	(substituted on) 51'
FH	23	Josh Ioane	(substituted on) 50'
Coach:
Tusi Pisi

Assistant referees:
Peter Martin (Ireland)
Robbie Jenkinson (Ireland)
Television match official:
Adam Jones (Wales)

Notes:

- Akira Ioane (Samoa) made his international debut.
- This was the first meeting between the two teams.

==== Zimbabwe v Uruguay ====
14 November 2026
15:00 GMT (UTC+00)

(1 BP) Zimbabwe	15–20	Uruguay
Try: Mavesere 20' c Muzanargwo 25' m Con: Robertson (1/2) 21'; Pen: Robertson (1/2) 13'	Report	Try: Alonso 7' c Gonzalez 30' c Con: Amarillo (2/2) 8', 31'; Pen: Amarillo (2/4) 43', 58'

Trailfinders Sports Ground, Ealing (England)
Attendance: 5,000
Referee: Katsuki Furuse (Japan)

Zimbabwe	Uruguay

FB	15	Tapiwa Mafura				(substituted off) 73'
RW	14	Matthew McNab		(substituted off) 32'
OC	13	Brandon Mudzekenyedzi
IC	12	Dion Khumalo
LW	11	Edward Sigauke
FH	10	Jason Robertson	Yellow card
SH	9	Tyrone Gombe		(substituted off) 56'
N8	8	Aiden Burnett		(substituted off) 31'	(substituted on) 40'	(substituted off) 61'
OF	7	Godfrey Muzanargwo
BF	6	Tinotenda Mavesere (c)
RL	5	Gary Porter		(substituted off) 80'
LL	4	Dale Lemon
TP	3	Bornwell Gwinji		(substituted off) 56'
HK	2	Liam Larkan		(substituted off) 56'
LP	1	Victor Mupunga		(substituted off) 61'
Substitutions:
HK	16	Bryan Chiang		(substituted on) 56'
PR	17	Tjide Visser		(substituted on) 61'
PR	18	Farai Mudariki		(substituted on) 56'
LK	19	Daniel Cooke		(substituted on) 80'
BR	20	Tadiwanashe Gwashu		(substituted on) 61'
BR	21	Vuyani Dhlomo		(substituted on) 31'	(substituted off) 40'	(substituted on) 73'
FH	22	Ian Prior		(substituted on) 56'
FH	23	Bruce Houston		(substituted on) 32'
Coach:
Pieter Benade

FB	15	Manuel Parodi	(substituted off) 72'
RW	14	Juan Gonzalez
OC	13	Justo Ferrario	(substituted off) 77'
IC	12	Juan Manuel Alonso
LW	11	Ignacio Álvarez Akiki
FH	10	Ícaro Amarillo
SH	9	Ignacio Rodríguez Bosch
N8	8	Manuel Diana
OF	7	Lucas Bianchi
BF	6	Manuel Ardao
RL	5	Manuel Leindekar (c)
LL	4	Felipe Aliaga	(substituted off) 62'
TP	3	Faustino Etchegorry	(substituted off) 50'
HK	2	Germán Kessler	(substituted off) 67'
LP	1	Mateo Sanguinetti	(substituted off) 72'
Substitutions:
HK	16	Germán Kigel	(substituted on) 67'
PR	17	Mateo Perillo	(substituted on) 72'
PR	18	Reinaldo Piussi	(substituted on) 50'
LK	19	Ignacio Dotti	(substituted on) 62'
LK	20	Manuel Rosmarino
SH	21	Pedro Hoblog
CE	22	Alfonso Perillo	(substituted on) 77'
CE	23	Alfonso Vidal	(substituted on) 72'
Coach:
Guzmán Barreiro

Assistant referees:
Ben Breakspear (Wales)
Ben Connor (Wales)
Television match official:
Stefano Penne (Italy)

Notes:

- Faustino Etchegorry and Manuel Parodi (both Uruguay) made their international debuts.
- Mateo Sanguinetti became just the second Uruguayan player to earn 100 test caps.
- This was the first meeting between the two teams.

==== Spain v Chile ====
14 November 2026
17:00 CET (UTC+01)

Spain	20–25	Chile
Try: García 36' c Merkler 53'; Con: Richardis (2/2) 37', 54'; Pen: Richardis (2/2) 42', 78'	Report	Try: Bustamante 23' c Con: Garafulic (1/1) 23'; Pen: Garafulic (6/6) 6', 10', 19', 49', 56', 64'

Butarque Stadium, Leganés
Attendance: 5,000
Referee: Hollie Davidson (Scotland)

Spain	Chile

FB	15	JW Bell
RW	14	Martiniano Cian
OC	13	Iñaki Mateu		(substituted off) 67'
IC	12	Yago Fernández		(substituted off) 62'
LW	11	Alberto Carmona
FH	10	Lucien Richardis
SH	9	Estanislao Bay	(yellow card) 65'
N8	8	Raphael Nieto	(yellow card) 18'	(substituted off) 68'
OF	7	Matthew Foulds		(substituted off) 20'
BF	6	Gabriel Vélez		(substituted off) 14'
RL	5	Antonio Suárez		(substituted off) 49'
LL	4	Ignacio Piñeiro
TP	3	Joel Merkler
HK	2	Álvaro García (c)		(substituted off) 74'
LP	1	Hugo Pirlet		(substituted off) 62'
Substitutions:
HK	16	Diego González		(substituted on) 74'
PR	17	Lucas Santamaría		(substituted on) 62'
PR	18	Jon Zabala		(substituted on) 49'
LK	19	Gauthier Maravat		(substituted on) 20'
BR	20	Vicente Boronat		(substituted on) 14'
BR	21	Manex Ariceta		(substituted on) 68'
SH	22	Nico Infer		(substituted on) 67'
WG	23	Alejandro Laforga		(substituted on) 62'
Coach:
Pablo Bouza

FB	15	Matías Garafulic
RW	14	Manuel Bustamante		(substituted off) 67'
OC	13	Santiago Videla (c)
IC	12	Iñaki Ayarza
LW	11	Nicolás Saab
FH	10	Rodrigo Fernández
SH	9	Benjamín Videla		(substituted off) 68'
N8	8	Alfonso Escobar		(substituted off) 75'
OF	7	Raimundo Martínez
BF	6	Ernesto Tchimino	(yellow card) 65'
RL	5	Javier Eissmann		(substituted off) 64'
LL	4	Santiago Pedrero
TP	3	Iñaki Gurruchaga		(substituted off) 73'
HK	2	Diego Escobar		(substituted off) 78'
LP	1	Vittorio Lastra
Substitutions:
HK	16	Augusto Böhme		(substituted on) 78'
PR	17	Norman Aguayo
PR	18	Matías Dittus		(substituted on) 73'
LK	19	Bruno Sáez		(substituted on) 75'
BR	20	Clemente Saavedra		(substituted on) 64'
SH	21	Marcelo Torrealba		(substituted on) 68'
CE	22	Domingo Saavedra		(substituted on) 67'
WG	23	Marco Alvano
Coach:
Pablo Lemoine

Assistant referees:
Matthew Carley (England)
George Selwood (England)
Television match official:
Dan Jones (England)

Notes:

- Gauthier Maravat (Spain) made his international debut.
- This was Chile's first win in Spain.

==== Romania v United States ====
14 November 2026
18:30 EET (UTC+02)

(1 BP) Romania	24–53	United States (1 BP)
Try: Gontineac 28' m Boboc 38' m Penalty try 70'; Mitu 80+1' c Con: Conache (1/1) 80+2'	Report	Try: Noah Brown 14' m McLean (2) 21' c, 76' c Mayo 31' c Damm 44' c Den Hoedt 50' c Lopeti 65' c Con: Hilsenbeck (5/6) 22', 32', 45', 51', 66'; Pittman (1/1) 77'; Pen: Hilsenbeck (1/1) 3'; Pittman (1/1) 72'

Stadionul National Arcul de Triumf, Bucharest
Attendance: 3,500
Referee: Anthony Woodthorpe (England)

Romania	United States

FB	15	Marius Simionescu	(substituted off) 67'
RW	14	Nicolas Onuțu
OC	13	Atila Septar
IC	12	Taylor Gontineac
LW	11	Iliesa Tiqe	(substituted off) 49'
FH	10	Daniel Plai	(substituted off) 75'
SH	9	Gabriel Rupanu	(substituted off) 49'
N8	8	Adrian Mitu
OF	7	Keanan Murray
BF	6	Cristi Boboc (c)	(substituted off) 58'
RL	5	Adrian Moțoc
LL	4	Andrei Mahu	(substituted off) 49'
TP	3	Jean-Pierre Smith	(substituted off) 51'
HK	2	Tudor Butnariu	(substituted off) 64'
LP	1	Iulian Harțig	(substituted off) 49'
Substitutions:
HK	16	Adrian Țală	(substituted on) 64'
PR	17	Alexandru Savin	(substituted on) 49'
PR	18	Gheorghe Gajion	(substituted on) 51'
LK	19	Logan Weidner	(substituted on) 49'
BR	20	Iacopo Bianchi	(substituted on) 58'
SH	21	Alin Conache	(substituted on) 49'
CE	22	Fonovai Tangimana	(substituted on) 67'
WG	23	Tevita Manumua	(substituted on) 49'
Coach:
David Gérard

FB	15	Perry Mayo
RW	14	Rufus McLean
OC	13	Tavite Lopeti
IC	12	Dominic Besag
LW	11	Noah Brown
FH	10	Christopher Hilsenbeck		(substituted off) 71'
SH	9	Oscar Lennon		(substituted off) 73'
N8	8	Nafi Ma'afu	(yellow card) 70'
OF	7	Paddy Ryan
BF	6	Benjamín Bonasso		(substituted off) 70'
RL	5	Jason Damm (c)		(substituted off) 64'
LL	4	Nathan Den Hoedt		(substituted off) 66'
TP	3	Tonga Kofe		(substituted off) 51'
HK	2	Kapeli Pifeleti		(substituted off) 63'
LP	1	Jack Iscaro		(substituted off) 66'
Substitutions:
HK	16	Kaleb Geiger		(substituted on) 63'
PR	17	Ezekiel Lindenmuth		(substituted on) 66'
PR	18	Charlie Abel		(substituted on) 61'
LK	19	Sam Golla		(substituted on) 66'
LK	20	Rhyno Herbst		(substituted on) 64'
BR	21	Marno Redelinghuys		(substituted on) 70'
SH	22	Spencer Huntley		(substituted on) 73'
FH	23	Tom Pittman		(substituted on) 71'
Coach:
Scott Lawrence

Assistant referees:
Saba Abulashvili (Georgia)
Saba Makharadze (Georgia)
Television match official:
Paulo Duarte (Portugal)

Notes:

- Fonovai Tangimana (Romania), Rhyno Herbst and Spencer Huntley (United States) made their international debuts.
- Marius Simionescu (Romania) earned his 50th test cap.

=== Round 6 ===
==== Romania v Canada ====
20 November 2026
18:30 EET (UTC+02)

(2 BP) Romania	26–27	Canada (1 BP)
Try: Atila Septar 22' m Bonaparte 36' c Smith 65' c Mitu 77' c Con: Conache (2/3) 37', 66'; Rupanu 78'	Report	Try: Steeves 5'; Olmstead 42' m LeSage 50' c Tremblay 60' m Con: McMullin (2/4) 6', 51'; Pen: McMullin (1/1) 14'

Stadionul National Arcul de Triumf, Bucharest
Referee: Damián Schneider (Argentina)

FB	15	Marius Simionescu
RW	14	Nicolas Onuțu	(yellow card) 42'
OC	13	Atila Septar		(substituted off) 67'
IC	12	Paul-Mihai Graure
LW	11	Damian Bonaparte		(substituted off) 53'
FH	10	Hinckley Vaovasa
SH	9	Alin Conache		(substituted off) 77'
N8	8	Adrian Mitu
OF	7	Keanan Murray
BF	6	Cristi Boboc (c)		(substituted off) 52'
RL	5	Andrei Mahu		(substituted off) 71'
LL	4	Logan Weidner
TP	3	Gheorghe Gajion		(substituted off) 52'
HK	2	Tudor Butnariu		(substituted off) 71'
LP	1	Alexandru Savin		(substituted off) 52'
Substitutions:
HK	16	Alexandru Colev		(substituted on) 71'
PR	17	Iulian Harțig		(substituted on) 52'
PR	18	Jean-Pierre Smith		(substituted on) 52'
LK	19	Ștefan Iancu		(substituted on) 71'
BR	20	Iacopo Bianchi		(substituted on) 52'
SH	21	Gabriel Rupanu		(substituted on) 77'
CE	22	Ioan-Stefan Cojocariu		(substituted on) 67'
WG	23	Jason Tomane		(substituted on) 53'
Coach:
David Gérard

FB	15	Takoda McMullin
RW	14	Kyle Tremblay
OC	13	Isaac Olson
IC	12	Ben LeSage (c)
LW	11	Nic Benn
FH	10	Spencer Jones
SH	9	Jason Higgins		(substituted off) 78'
N8	8	Tyler Ardron
OF	7	Siôn Parry		(substituted off) 39'
BF	6	Matt Beukeboom
RL	5	Evan Olmstead
LL	4	Daragh Doyle		(substituted off) 66'
TP	3	Kyle Steeves		(substituted off) 73'
HK	2	Andrew Quattrin		(substituted off) 23'	(substituted on) 39'	(substituted off) 73'
LP	1	Cali Martinez		(substituted off) 66'
Substitutions:
HK	16	Dewald Kotze		(substituted on) 23'	(substituted off) 39'	(substituted on) 73'
PR	17	Sam Miller		(substituted on) 66'
PR	18	Cole Keith		(substituted on) 73'
LK	19	Izzak Kelly		(substituted on) 66'
BR	20	Matt Oworu	(yellow card) 66'	(substituted on) 39'
SH	21	Jesse Kilgour		(substituted on) 78'
CE	22	Josh Thiel
WG	23	Demetri Patterson
Coach:
Steve Meehan

Assistant referees:
Federico Vedovelli (Italy)
Filippo Russo (Italy)
Television match official:
Francisco González (Uruguay)

==== Hong Kong v Tonga ====
21 November 2026
18:00 HKT (UTC+08)

Hong Kong	v	Tonga

Kai Tak Youth Sports Ground, Hong Kong
Referee: Jordan Way (Australia)

Assistant referees:
Katsuki Furuse (Japan)
Ibuki Tetsuka (Japan)
Television match official:
Julien Castaignède (France)

==== Georgia v United States ====
21 November 2026
18:00 GET (UTC+04)

Georgia	v	United States

Mikheil Meskhi Stadium, Tbilisi
Referee: Morné Ferreira (South Africa)

Assistant referees:
Peter Martin (Ireland)
Robbie Jenkinson (Ireland)
Television match official:
Paulo Duarte (Portugal)

==== Portugal v Uruguay ====
21 November 2026
15:00 WET (UTC+0)

Portugal	v	Uruguay

Estádio Nacional, Lisbon
Referee: Kevin Bralley (France)

Assistant referees:
Thomas Charabas (France)
Ruairidh Campbell (Scotland)
Television match official:
Julien Castaignède (France)

==== Zimbabwe v Chile ====
21 November 2026
16:45 CET (UTC+01)

Zimbabwe	v	Chile

Stade Chanzy, Angoulême (France)
Referee: Ben Breakspear (Wales)

Assistant referees:
Evan Urruzmend (France)
Julien Caulier (France)
Television match official:
Paulo Duarte (Portugal)

==== Spain v Samoa ====
21 November 2026
17:00 CET (UTC+01)

Spain	v	Samoa
	https://www.world.rugby/nations-cup/en/match/27945fca-c138-4cf7-bd66-eee0741af210

Estadio Ciudad de Málaga, Málaga
Referee: Ben Connor (Wales)

Assistant referees:
Adam Jones (Wales)
Jamie Parr (England)
Television match official:
Francisco González (Uruguay)

== See also ==
- 2026 World Rugby Nations Cup
- 2026 Nations Championship Northern Hemisphere Series
- 2026 men's rugby union internationals
