= Sport in Zimbabwe =

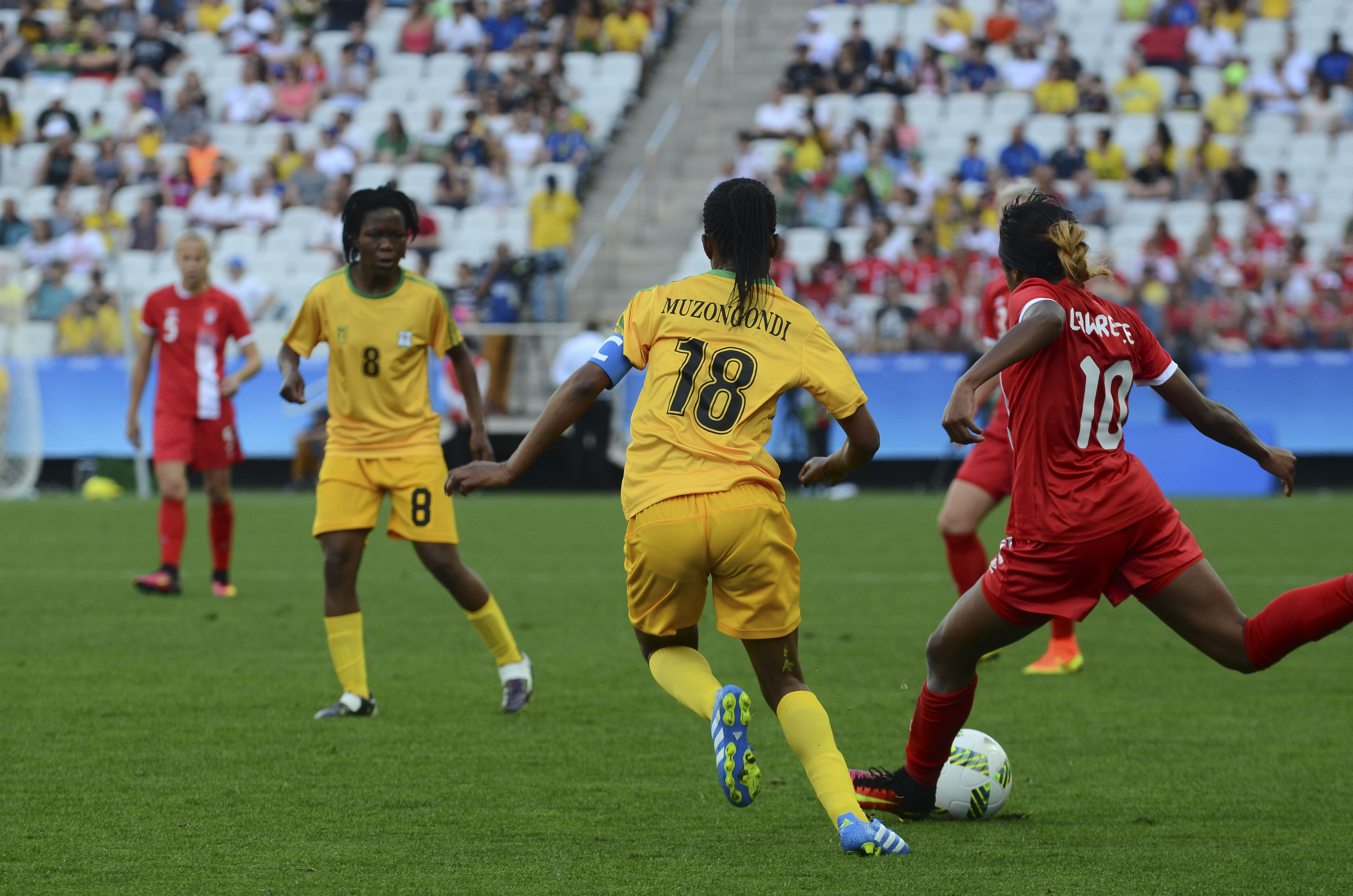
Zimbabwe women's national football team at the 2016 Olympic Games

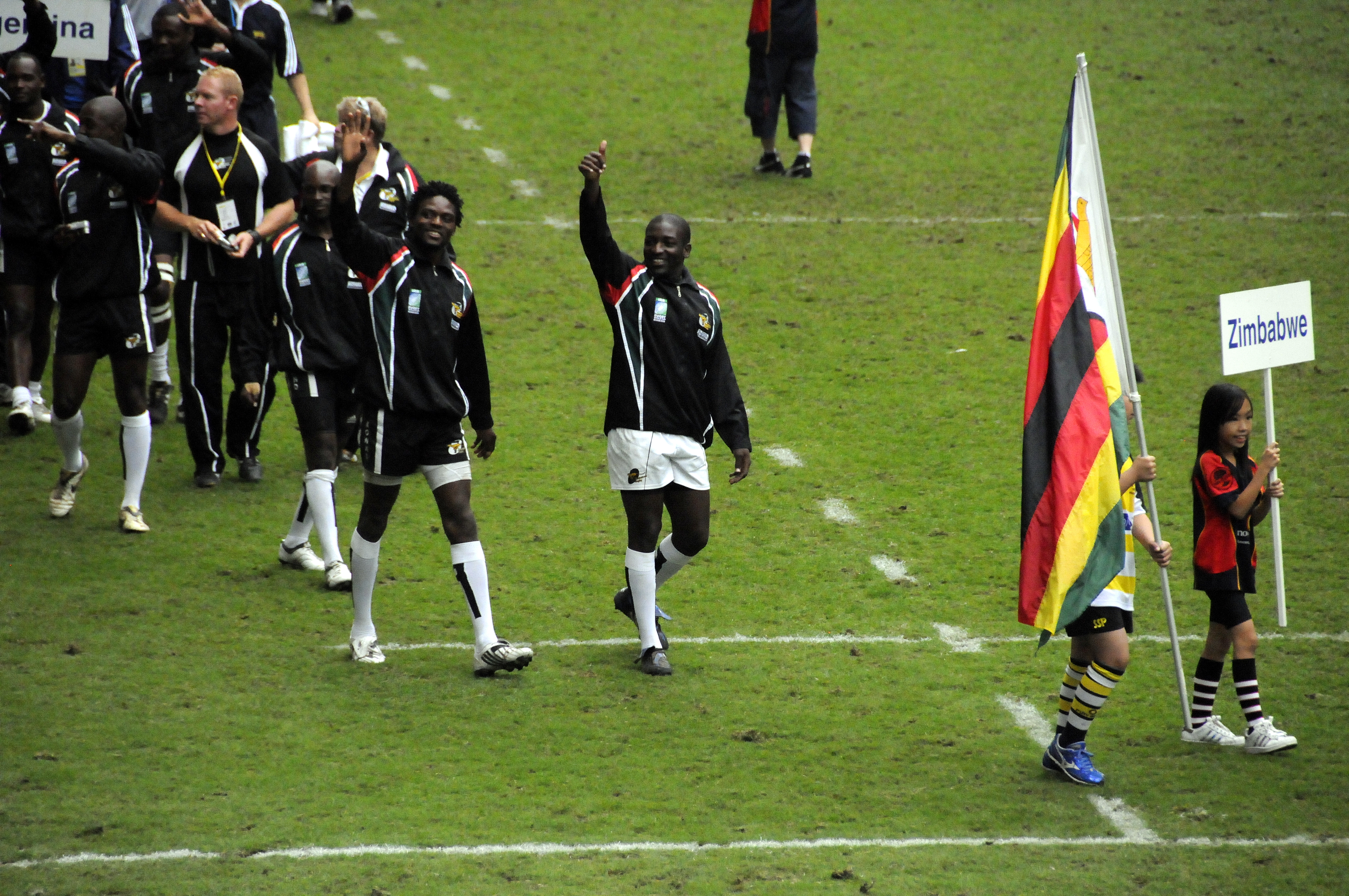
Zimbabwe Sevens Rugby Team at the 2009 Hong Kong Sevens

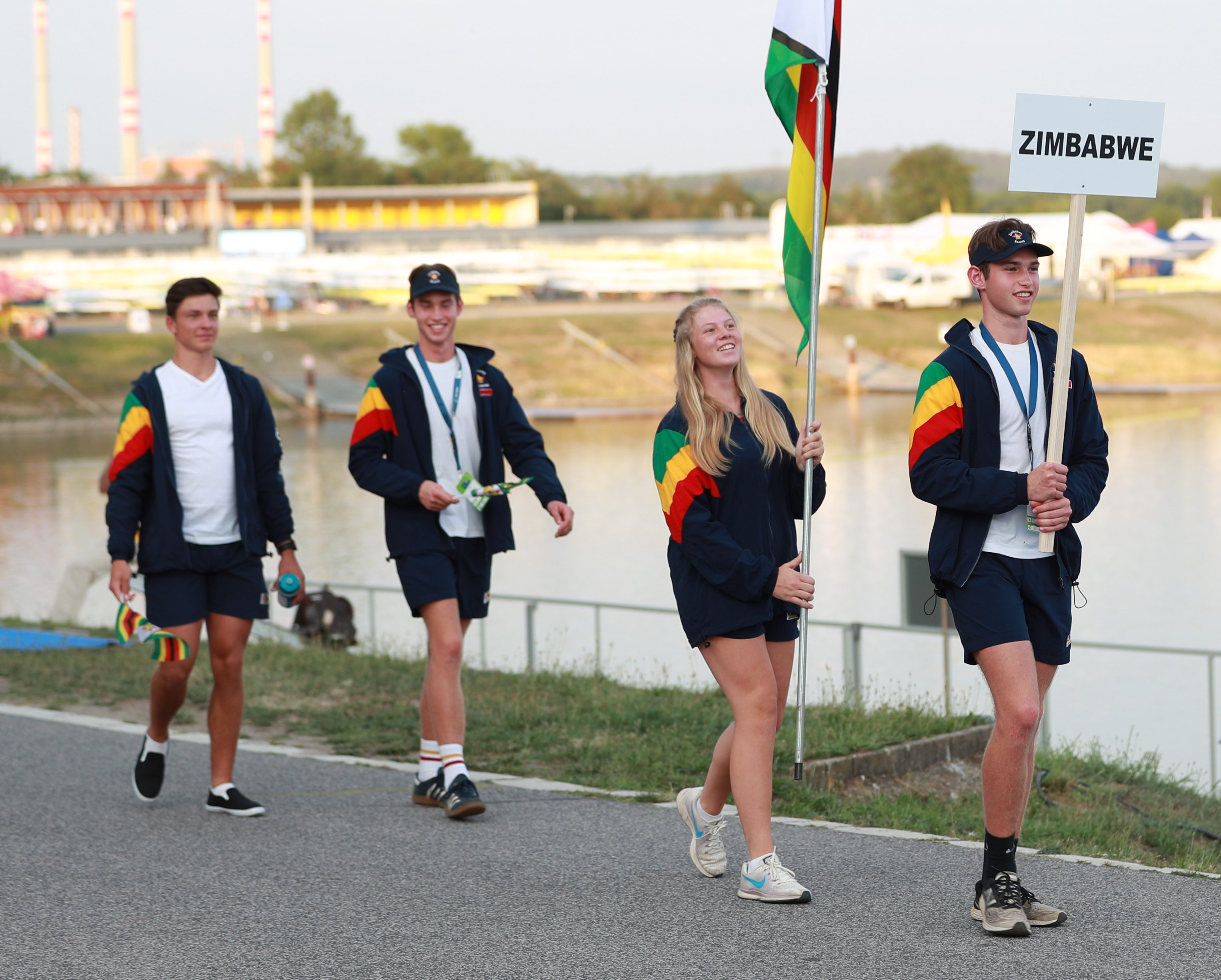
Zimbabwe at 2018 World Rowing Junior Championships

Sport in Zimbabwe has a long tradition and has produced many world recognized sports names and personalities. Football is the most popular sport, although rugby union, cricket, tennis, golf, and netball also have a following, traditionally among the middle class and the white minority. Field hockey is also played widely.

Although Zimbabwe has produced many athletes that have competed for Zimbabwe, there are also many athletes who learned their sport in Zimbabwe, but have chosen to represent other countries, due to greater earning opportunities abroad. Despite this the country has long punched above its weight, with international success in cricket, tennis, rugby union, field hockey, and swimming among other sports. Much of this can be attributed to the country's historically strong sporting and educational culture as well as an attractive climate that encourages outdoor pursuits.

== Cricket ==
Cricket is the second most popular sport in Zimbabwe after football. The national team is one of 12 elite Full Members that play Test cricket. They began after defeating the Australian national cricket team in an upset in 1983.

This led to the country achieving test status in 1992, and further international success in the early 2000s. Andy Flower, a Zimbabwean batsman, ranked as the top batsman in the world, during this era. However, issues of corruption, mismanagement, emigration and a decline in funding led to a series of poor performances in Test cricket into the past decade. The team have recently improved with a revamped domestic structure.

== Field hockey ==
Field hockey has the second biggest player base in the country after football, equally split among genders and a strong youth foundation in many schools. Currently, Zimbabwe has three pitches, two in Bulawayo – one water base and one sand filled – and another sand filled at the Arundel School in the capital city of Harare. Bulawayo has approximately 1,000 hockey players and Harare 8,000. While the country had a tradition in the sport, with the women's team being gold medallist of the inaugural Olympic tournament in Moscow 1980, they struggled in recent times largely due to their inability to participate in international competitions organized by the African Hockey Federation (AfHF) and the International Hockey Federation (FIH), until the Khumalo Hockey Stadium was refurbished and played host to the 2011 African Olympic Qualifier.

== Football ==
The Zimbabwe national football team, nicknamed The Warriors, have qualified for the African Cup of Nations six times (in 2004, 2006, 2017, 2019, 2021 and 2025), but have never passed the group stages.

The Zimbabwe women's national football team, nicknamed Mighty Warriors, qualified for the 2016 Olympic football tournament.

The Zimbabwe Premier Soccer League (known as Castle Lager Premier Soccer League) is the top professional division in Zimbabwe. There are 18 teams in the division. There are two main cup competitions played in Zimbabwe, both are knockout tournaments. The first is the Mbada Diamonds Cup. Football administrators have partnered with a local company to launch another cup game – Chibuku Super Cup. The CBZ FA Cup was first created as the Southern Rhodesia Castle Cup in 1962. The other major cup is the Zimbabwean Independence Trophy created as a clubs competition in 1983.

The largest stadium is the multi-use National Sports Stadium.

Notable Zimbabwean footballers are Benjamin "Benjani" Mwaruwari, who played for Manchester City as a striker, having taken over the captaincy from Peter Ndlovu. Ndlovu is also a notable Zimbabwean footballer having spent twelve seasons playing for top English football clubs. Another well known Zimbabwean footballer is Bruce Grobbelaar, a goalkeeper, who played for the national team, but most notably for Liverpool F.C. from 1980 to 1994.

== Rugby union ==
Rugby union is a significant sport in Zimbabwe, dating back to the late 19th century. The Zimbabwe national rugby union team has been at the Rugby World Cup twice. The country has also produced a number of significant rugby players, although there most of the country's best often leave for the United Kingdom, South Africa and Australia, due to the lack of a professional league and the lure of much greater salaries abroad.

Excluding South Africa, Zimbabwe is one of only 3 nations in Africa to qualify for the Rugby World Cup, the others being Namibia and the Ivory Coast. The Sables maintain fierce rivalries with regional neighbors Namibia and Kenya, as the respective three nations have vied for African supremacy since the 2000s.

Zimbabwe won the 2024 Rugby Africa Cup, upsetting nine-time champions Namibia in the semi-final, their first victory over their southern African rivals in 23 years. The Sables repeated this feat in the 2025 Rugby Africa Cup, defeating favorites Namibia 30-28 in the final and qualifying for the 2027 Rugby World Cup, their first since 1991.

== Golf ==
Zimbabwe has a long history in the sport with highlights provided by greats such as Nick Price, Brendon de Jonge, Mark McNulty and Tony Johnstone.

With dozens of courses for the 15 million population, the country is well served. Zimbabwean golfers compete on the Sunshine Tour with a strong rivalry with South Africa. Many of the most prolific golfers tend to move on to the European and PGA Tours.

Zimbabwe reached the final of the 1995 Dunhill Cup, where they narrowly lost to Scotland.

== Polocrosse ==
Polocrosse has been played in Zimbabwe (at the time Rhodesia) since 1948. In 1997, Zimbabwe became the World Champions when they went unbeaten against Australia, New Zealand, and South Africa in Pietermaritzburg. Zimbabwe came fourth out of eight countries at the inaugural World Cup in 2003. Zimbabwe also won the Polocrosse Africa Cup in 2004. There are currently an estimated 156 playing members from 10 clubs. At the sports playing peak in 1996, there were 420 players. The decrease in Polocrosse players is due primarily to the Zimbabwean diaspora, and on-going economic and political crisis in the country. Polocrosse is often played by people from a rural background, and due to the land reforms in Zimbabwe, many of these people have left the country.

== Tennis ==
Zimbabwe has also competed at Wimbledon and the Davis Cup in tennis, most notably with the Black Family, which comprises Wayne Black, Byron Black, and Cara Black. Zimbabwe's tennis players have also competed in most of the Olympic Games since independence in 1980.

== Olympics and other games ==
Zimbabwe has won eight Olympic medals, one (team medal) in field hockey at the (boycotted) 1980 Summer Olympics in Moscow, and the other seven by swimmer Kirsty Coventry, three at the 2004 Summer Olympics in Athens and four at the 2008 Summer Olympics in Beijing. Coventry won two gold medals, four silver, and one bronze.

Zimbabwe also did well in the Commonwealth Games and All-Africa Games in swimming, with Coventry winning 11 gold medals in the different competitions. The country hosted the 1995 All-Africa Games.

In sailing, Patrick McCosh has won a bronze medal in the Laser (dinghy) at the 2007 All-Africa Games
