= 2025 Rugby Africa Cup =

International rugby union competition Africa

Tournament details
- Host country: Uganda
- Dates: 8–19 July
- Teams: 8
- Venue(s): 1 (in 1 host city)

Final positions
- Champions: Zimbabwe (3rd title)
- Runners-up: Namibia
- Third place: Algeria
- Fourth place: Kenya

Tournament statistics
- Matches played: 12
- Top scorer(s): (Zimbabwe) Ian Prior (52)
- Best player(s): (Zimbabwe) Ian Prior

The 2025 Rugby Africa Cup was the 20th edition of the Rugby Africa Cup. Administered by Rugby Africa, it was held from 8 to 19 July in Kampala, Uganda for the second consecutive time, featuring eight teams.

The competition also served as a qualification for the 2027 Rugby World Cup with winners Zimbabwe qualifying for the World Cup, and runners-up Namibia progressing to an Africa / Asia play-off match.

== Venue ==
2025 Rugby Africa Cup is located in Uganda	Kampala
2025 Rugby Africa Cup is located in Uganda	Mandela National Stadium annex
2025 Rugby Africa Cup is located in Uganda	Capacity: 10,000

== Participants ==
Nation	Stadium			Head coach	Captain
Nation	Home stadium	Capacity	Location	Head coach	Captain
Algeria	Ahmed Zabana Stadium	40,000	Oran	(France) Adrien Buononato	Rabah Abdelkader
Ivory Coast	Felix Houphouet Boigny Stadium	33,000	Abidjan	(Ivory Coast) Edgar Babou	Edgar Babou
Kenya	RFUEA Ground	6,000	Nairobi	(South Africa) Jerome Paarwater	Daniel Sikuta
Morocco	Stade Tessema	5,000	Casablanca	(France) Pierre Chadebech	Houssine Arabat
Namibia	Hage Geingob Rugby Stadium	10,000	Windhoek	(Namibia) Jacques Burger	Prince !Gaoseb
Senegal	Stade Iba Mar Diop	5,000	Dakar	(France) Jean-Marc Foucras	Demba Kane
Uganda	Legends Rugby Grounds	5,000	Kampala	(Uganda) Fred Mudoola	Byron Oketayot
Zimbabwe	National Sports Stadium	60,000	Harare	(Zimbabwe) Piet Benade	Hilton Mudariki

== Knockout stage ==
Quarter-finals
Zimbabwe	43
Morocco	8
Kenya	32
Uganda	24
Namibia	55
Senegal	17
Algeria	41
Ivory Coast	6

Semi-finals
Zimbabwe	29
Kenya	23
Namibia	21
Algeria	7

Final
Zimbabwe	30
Namibia	28
Third place
Kenya	5
Algeria	15

=== Quarter-finals ===
8 July 2025
10:00

Zimbabwe	43–8	Morocco
	Report

Mandela National Stadium, Kampala
Referee: Zaid Isaacs (Namibia)

8 July 2025
12:00

Algeria	41–6	Ivory Coast
	Report

Mandela National Stadium, Kampala
Referee: Anthony Diaz (France)

8 July 2025
14:00

Namibia	55–17	Senegal
	Report

Mandela National Stadium, Kampala
Referee: Paul Mente (South Africa)

8 July 2025
16:00

Kenya	32–24	Uganda
	Report

Mandela National Stadium, Kampala
Referee: Sylvain Mane (Senegal)

=== Semi-finals ===
13 July 2025
14:00

Algeria	7–21	Namibia
	Report

Mandela National Stadium, Kampala
Referee: Sylvain Mane (Senegal)

13 July 2025
16:00

Zimbabwe	29–23	Kenya
	Report

Mandela National Stadium, Kampala
Referee: Ronald Wutimber (Uganda)

=== Third place match ===
19 July 2025
12:00

Algeria	15–5	Kenya
	Report

Mandela National Stadium, Kampala
Referee: Talent Gandiwa (Zimbabwe)

=== Final ===
19 July 2025
16:00

Namibia	28–30	Zimbabwe
Try: ǃGaoseb 34' c Nel 61' m Booysen 70' c Con: Loubser (1/2) 35'; Swanepoel 71'; Pen: Loubser (3/3) 5', 10', 21'		Try: Mashawi 17' c Muzanargwo 45' c Mudzekenyedzi 59' c Con: Prior (3/3) 18', 46', 60'; Pen: Prior (3/4) 8', 13', 27'

Mandela National Stadium, Kampala
Referee: Paul Mente (South Africa)

Team details

FB	15	Cliven Loubser
RW	14	Jay-Cee Nel
OC	13	Le Roux Malan
IC	12	Danco Burger
LW	11	Jurgen Meyer
FH	10	André van den Berg		(substituted off) 61'
SH	9	Jacques Theron	(yellow card) 23'	(substituted off) 47'
N8	8	Richard Hardwick
OF	7	Wian Conradie		(substituted off) 56'
BF	6	Prince ǃGaoseb (c)		(substituted off) 69'
RL	5	Tiaan de Klerk
LL	4	Adriaan Ludick		(substituted off) 40'
TP	3	Aranos Coetzee		(substituted off) 76'
HK	2	Louis van der Westhuizen		(substituted off) 71'
LP	1	Otja Auala		(substituted off) 76'
Replacements:
HK	16	Armand Combrinck		(substituted in) 71'
PR	17	Jason Benade		(substituted in) 76'
PR	18	Haitembu Shikufa		(substituted in) 76'
LK	19	Johan Retief		(substituted in) 40'
FL	20	Max Katjijeko		(substituted in) 69'
SH	21	AJ Kearns		(substituted in) 47'
FH	22	Tiaan Swanepoel		(substituted in) 61'
FL	23	Adriaan Booysen		(substituted in) 56'
Coach:
(Namibia) Jacques Burger

FB	15	Tapiwa Mafura
RW	14	Matthew McNab
OC	13	Brandon Mudzekenyedzi
IC	12	Kudzai Mashawi		(substituted off) 56'
LW	11	Edward Sigauke		(substituted off) 71'
FH	10	Ian Prior
SH	9	Hilton Mudariki (c)		(substituted off) 69'
N8	8	Jason Fraser	(yellow card) 33'
OF	7	Dylan Utete		(substituted off) 50'
BF	6	Tinotenda Mavesere
RL	5	Simba Siraha
LL	4	Godfrey Muzanargwo
TP	3	Cleopas Kundiona		(substituted off) 63'
HK	2	Simba Mandioma		(substituted off) 71'	(substituted in) 77'
LP	1	Victor Mupunga		(substituted off) 73'
Replacements:
HK	16	Liam Larkan		(substituted in) 71'	(substituted off) 77'
PR	17	Tyran Fagan		(substituted in) 73'
PR	18	Bornwell Gwinji		(substituted in) 63'
LK	19	Tadiwanashe Gwashu
FL	20	Aiden Burnett		(substituted in) 50'
SH	21	Keegan Joubert		(substituted in) 69'
CE	22	Dion Khumalo		(substituted in) 71'
FH	23	Bruce Houston		(substituted in) 56'
Coach:
(Zimbabwe) Piet Bienade

Assistant referees:
Sylvain Mane (Senegal)
Ronald Wutimber (Uganda)

== Classification stage ==
Semi-finals
Morocco	24
Uganda	12
Senegal	28
Ivory Coast	3

5th/6th
Morocco	28
Senegal	33
7th/8th
Uganda	37
Ivory Coast	17

=== Semi-finals ===
13 July 2025
10:00

Ivory Coast	3–28	Senegal
	Report

Mandela National Stadium, Kampala
Referee: Stéphane Rakotonirainy (Madagascar)

13 July 2025
12:00

Morocco	24–12	Uganda
	Report

Mandela National Stadium, Kampala
Referee: Benjamin Beuriot (France)

=== 7th/8th play-off ===
19 July 2025
14:00

Ivory Coast	17–37	Uganda

Mandela National Stadium, Kampala
Referee: Nicardo Pienaar (Namibia)

=== 5th/6th play-off ===
19 July 2025
10:00

Senegal	33–28 (a.s.d)	Morocco
	Report

Mandela National Stadium, Kampala
Referee: Benjamin Beuriot (France)

== Final standings ==
Pos.	Team	Qualification
1st place, gold medalist(s)	Zimbabwe	Qualified for the 2027 Men's Rugby World Cup
2nd place, silver medalist(s)	Namibia	Qualified for the 2027 Men's Rugby World Cup – Regional play-off
3rd place, bronze medalist(s)	Algeria	
4	Kenya	
5	Senegal	
6	Morocco	
7	Uganda	
8	Ivory Coast	
