= Andrew MacDonald =

Andrew MacDonald may refer to:

- Andrew MacDonald (ice hockey) (born 1986), Canadian professional ice hockey defenceman
- Andrew Macdonald (producer) (born 1966), Scottish film producer
- Duck MacDonald (born 1953), real name Andrew MacDonald, American rock guitarist
- Andrew Archibald Macdonald (1829–1912), Canadian politician
- Andrew Paul MacDonald (born 1958), Canadian composer
- Andrew Macdonald (poet) (1757–1790), Scottish poet
- Andy Macdonald (skateboarder) (born 1973), American professional skateboarder
- Andy MacDonald (American football) (1930–1985), American football player and coach
- Andy MacDonald (rugby union)
- Andrew MacDonald (rugby union) (born 1966), Scottish rugby union international
- Andrew Macdonald, pseudonym of William Luther Pierce (1933–2002), American leader of the white separatist National Alliance organization and author of The Turner Diaries

== See also ==
- Andrew McDonald (disambiguation)
