= Zimbabwe Rugby Union =

Governing body of rugby union in Zimbabwe

- Sport: Rugby union
- Founded: 1895
- World Rugby affiliation: 1987
- Rugby Africa affiliation: 1987
- President: Aaron Jani
- Men's coach: Pieter Benade
- Website: zru.co.zw

The Zimbabwe Rugby Union was founded in 1895 as the Rhodesia Rugby Football Union, and is the governing body of rugby union in Zimbabwe.

When the Pioneer Column arrived in Rhodesia from the Cape Province in 1890, it brought with it the country's first rugby players. The oldest clubs in the country were formed in 1894 in Bulawayo and the Rhodesia Rugby Football Union was founded one year later in 1895.

Rhodesia competed in the second division of South Africa's Currie Cup.

In 1980 the Rhodesia Rugby Football Union was renamed the Zimbabwe Rugby Union when the country's name changed as well.

Today, rugby union is a popular minority sport in Zimbabwe, though nowhere near as popular as football or cricket.

== See also ==
- Zimbabwe national rugby union team
