= Edward Sigauke =

Zimbabwean rugby union player

- Born: Edward Makomborero Sigauke; 28 January 2004 (age 22) Zimbabwe
- Height: 1.73 m (5 ft 8 in)
- Weight: 80 kg (12 st 8 lb)
- School: Lomagundi College
- University: Varsity College

Rugby union career
- Position: Wing
- Current team: Harlequins
Amateur team(s)
Years	Team	Apps	(Points)
2025–6	Varsity College	6	(30)
Senior career
Years	Team	Apps	(Points)
2026–	Harlequins	1	(10)
- Correct as of 20 September 2026
International career
Years	Team	Apps	(Points)
2024–	Zimbabwe	11	(45)
- Correct as of 11 July 2026

Edward Makomborero Sigauke (born 28 January 2004) is a Zimbabwean international rugby union player, who plays his club rugby for Harlequins in England's Prem Rugby.

== School and University Careers ==
Educated at Lomagundi College in Chinhoyi, Sigauke captained the Zimbabwe under 20s in the 2024 Barthés Trophy. Sigauke then began studying at Varsity College in South Africa, playing in their First XV. Varsity College won the 2025 Varsity Shield competition and promotion to the 2026 Varsity Cup, with Sigauke scoring a try in the final.

== Club career ==
In August 2026, he signed for Prem Rugby club Harlequins ahead of the 2026-27 season.

== International career ==
Sigauke made his senior Sables debut in the 2024 Rugby Africa Cup against Uganda. He played in all three of Zimbabwe's matches, scoring two tries as they won the Africa Cup title for the first time since 2012. Sigauke repeated the feat a year later, playing in all three of Zimbabwe's games as they won the 2025 edition, earning their qualification for the 2027 Rugby World Cup.

== Career statistics ==
=== International Tries ===
As of 4 July 2026

Try	Opposing team	Location	Venue	Competition	Date	Result	Score
1	Uganda	Kampala, Uganda	Mandela National Stadium	2024 Rugby Africa Cup	20 July 2024	Win	22 – 20
2	Namibia	Kampala, Uganda	Mandela National Stadium	2024 Rugby Africa Cup	24 July 2024	Win	32 – 10
3	Algeria	Kampala, Uganda	Mandela National Stadium	2024 Rugby Africa Cup	28 July 2024	Win	29 – 3
4	United Arab Emirates	Dubai, United Arab Emirates	The Sevens Stadium	2024 end-of-year internationals	5 November 2024	Win	62 – 22
5	United Arab Emirates	Dubai, United Arab Emirates	The Sevens Stadium	2024 end-of-year internationals	5 November 2024	Win	62 – 22
6	United Arab Emirates	Dubai, United Arab Emirates	The Sevens Stadium	2024 end-of-year internationals	5 November 2024	Win	62 – 22
7	Morocco	Kampala, Uganda	Mandela National Stadium	2025 Rugby Africa Cup	8 July 2025	Win	43 – 8
8	Tonga	Denver, Colorado, USA	Dick's Sporting Goods Park	2026 World Rugby Nations Cup	4 July 2026	Loss	26 – 36
9	United States	Charlotte, North Carolina, USA	American Legion Memorial Stadium	2026 World Rugby Nations Cup	4 November 2026	Loss	15 – 31
