= 1995 Rugby World Cup – Africa qualification =

For the 1995 Rugby World Cup in South Africa, the Confederation of African Rugby was allocated one direct qualifying place (Africa 1) in addition to the automatic qualifying place granted to South Africa as host of tournament.

Seven teams participated in the qualification tournament. The teams were split into two pools for the first stage held in 1993, with the matches in Pool A taking place in Nairobi and the matches in Pool B being played in Tunis. the two top teams in each pool progressed to the second stage which was another round robin held at Casablanca in 1994. Ivory Coast was the first placed team after the second stage and secured qualification for the 1995 tournament.

== Africa ==
=== Round 1 ===
Group A

Team	Played	Won	Drawn	Lost	For	Against	Difference	Points
Namibia	3	3	0	0	165	55	+110	9
Zimbabwe	3	2	0	1	118	69	+49	7
Kenya	3	1	0	2	40	125	−65	5
Arabian Gulf	3	0	0	3	64	138	−74	3

Match Results
Date	Home	Score	Away	Venue
3 July 1993	Kenya	7–42	Zimbabwe	Nairobi, Kenya
3 July 1993	Namibia	64–20	Arabian Gulf	Nairobi, Kenya
7 July 1993	Kenya	9–60	Namibia	Nairobi, Kenya
7 July 1993	Zimbabwe	50–21	Arabian Gulf	Nairobi, Kenya
10 July 1993	Kenya	24–23	Arabian Gulf	Nairobi, Kenya
10 July 1993	Namibia	41–26	Zimbabwe	Nairobi, Kenya

Namibia and Zimbabwe Qualified for the Round 2

Group B

Team	Played	Won	Drawn	Lost	For	Against	Difference	Points
Ivory Coast	2	2	0	0	44	19	+25	6
Morocco	2	1	0	1	9	30	−21	4
Tunisia	2	0	0	2	21	25	−4	2

Match Results
Date	Home	Score	Away	Venue
26 October 1993	Tunisia	16–19	Ivory Coast	Tunis, Tunisia
28 October 1993	Tunisia	5–6	Morocco	Tunis, Tunisia
30 October 1993	Ivory Coast	25–3	Morocco	Tunis, Tunisia

Ivory Coast and Morocco Qualified for the Round 2

=== Round 2 ===
Final Qualifying Group

Team	Played	Won	Drawn	Lost	For	Against	Difference	Points
Ivory Coast	3	2	0	1	39	39	0	7
Namibia	3	1	1	1	53	49	+4	6
Morocco	3	1	1	1	42	46	−4	6
Zimbabwe	3	1	0	2	51	51	0	5

Match Results
Date	Home	Score	Away	Venue
14 June 1994	Namibia	25–20	Zimbabwe	Casablanca, Morocco
14 June 1994	Morocco	17–9	Ivory Coast	Casablanca, Morocco
16 June 1994	Morocco	9–21	Zimbabwe	Casablanca, Morocco
16 June 1994	Ivory Coast	13–12	Namibia	Casablanca, Morocco
18 June 1994	Ivory Coast	17–10	Zimbabwe	Casablanca, Morocco
18 June 1994	Morocco	16–16	Namibia	Casablanca, Morocco

Ivory Coast qualified for the 1995 Rugby World Cup
