= Ian Prior (rugby union) =

Australian-Zimbabwean rugby union player

- Born: Ian Prior; 21 August 1990 (age 36) Bundaberg, Queensland, Australia
- Height: 1.79 m (5 ft 10 1/2 in)
- Weight: 83 kg (13 st 1 lb)

Rugby union career
- Position: Scrum-Half/ Fly-half
Senior career
| Years | Team | Apps | (Points) |
| 2014–2017 | Perth Spirit | 18 | (138) |
| 2017–2018 | Harlequin F.C. | 5 | (0) |
| 2018–2024 | Western Force | 48 | (82) |
- Correct as of 22 October 2016
Super Rugby
| Years | Team | Apps | (Points) |
| 2011 | Queensland Reds | 6 | (0) |
| 2012–2013 | Brumbies | 25 | (15) |
| 2014–2017 | Western Force | 35 | (82) |
| 2020 | Western Force | 2 | (13) |
- Correct as of 18 July 2020
International career
| Years | Team | Apps | (Points) |
| 2010 | Australia U20 | 2 | (0) |
| 2024- | Zimbabwe | 9 | (105) |
- Correct as of 18 July 2026

Ian Prior (born 21 August 1990) is an Australian-born Zimbabwe international rugby union player who previously played for the Western Force in Super Rugby AU and Super Rugby Trans-Tasman. He previously played for the Force, Reds and Brumbies teams in Australia at Super Rugby level, as well as for English club Harlequins. Prior's usual position is scrum-half but he can also play fly-half.

== Rugby union career ==
Prior played for the Australia under-20 team at the 2010 Junior World Championship in Argentina.

He made his Super Rugby debut for the Reds against the Lions in Johannesburg during the 2011 Super Rugby season. Prior moved to Canberra prior to the start of the 2012, where he signed a two-year deal to play for the Brumbies.

He joined the Perth-based Western Force ahead of the 2014 Super Rugby season. After the removal of the Force from the Super Rugby competition in the latter half of 2017, Prior signed a short-term deal to play for English club Harlequins, and then rejoined the Force as captain for the new World Series Rugby season in 2018.

Later that year, he was also targeted as a potential player for Zimbabwe, but took no part in their Africa Cup campaign. Prior remained captain of the Western Force for the 2018 National Rugby Championship.

He made his international debut for Zimbabwe in 2024, playing a vital role in the country's victorious 2024 and 2025 Rugby Africa Cup campaigns, the latter of which saw Prior awarded the Player of the Tournament accolade as Zimbabwe qualified for the 2027 Rugby World Cup. He was also the top scorer with 52 points.

== Super Rugby statistics ==
As of 15 July 2017

| Season | Team | Games | Starts | Sub | Mins | Tries | Cons | Pens | Drops | Points | Yel | Red |
|---|---|---|---|---|---|---|---|---|---|---|---|---|
| 2011 | Reds | 6 | 0 | 6 | 44 | 0 | 0 | 0 | 0 | 0 | 0 | 0 |
| 2012 | Brumbies | 12 | 4 | 8 | 386 | 1 | 0 | 0 | 0 | 5 | 0 | 0 |
| 2013 | Brumbies | 13 | 2 | 11 | 347 | 0 | 5 | 0 | 0 | 10 | 0 | 0 |
| 2014 | Force | 15 | 8 | 7 | 715 | 0 | 0 | 0 | 0 | 0 | 0 | 0 |
| 2015 | Force | 9 | 1 | 8 | 136 | 0 | 0 | 0 | 0 | 0 | 0 | 1 |
| 2016 | Force | 13 | 7 | 6 | 485 | 0 | 8 | 6 | 0 | 34 | 0 | 0 |
| 2017 | Force | 13 | 5 | 8 | 485 | 0 | 6 | 12 | 0 | 48 | 0 | 0 |
| Total | | 80 | 27 | 53 | 2678 | 1 | 19 | 18 | 0 | 97 | 0 | 1 |

== International Statistics ==
| Cap. | Opponents | Results (Zim 1st) | Position | Points | Dates | Venue |
|---|---|---|---|---|---|---|
| 1. | Uganda | 22–20 | Flyhalf | 7 (2 conv, 1 pen) | 20 July 2024 | Mandela National Stadium, Kampala |
| 2. | Namibia | 32–10 | Flyhalf | 9 (3 conv, 1 pen) | 24 July 2024 | Mandela National Stadium, Kampala |
| 3. | United Arab Emirates | 62–22 | Flyhalf | 15 (6 conv, 1 pen) | 5 November 2024 | The Sevens Stadium, Dubai |
| 4. | South Korea | 27–22 | Flyhalf | 12 (3 conv, 2 pen) | 16 November 2024 | Namdong Asiad Rugby Field, Incheon |
| 5. | Morocco | 43–8 | Flyhalf | 23 (4 conv, 5 pen) | 8 July 2025 | Mandela National Stadium, Kampala |
| 6. | Kenya | 29–23 | Flyhalf | 14 (1 conv, 3 pen, 1 drop) | 13 July 2025 | Mandela National Stadium, Kampala |
| 7. | Namibia | 30–28 | Flyhalf | 15 (3 conv, 3 pen) | 19 July 2025 | Mandela National Stadium, Kampala |
| 8. | Tonga | 26–36 | Flyhalf | 6 (3 conv) | 4 July 2026 | Dick's Sporting Goods Park, Denver, Colorado |

Legend: pen = penalty (3 pts.); conv = conversion (2 pts.), drop = drop kick (3 pts.).
