= Andrew McDonald =

Andrew McDonald may refer to:

== Politics ==
- Andrew McDonald (Australian politician) (born 1955), Australian doctor and politician
- Andrew J. McDonald (born 1966), American judge and politician from Connecticut
- Andy McDonald (politician) (born 1958), British Labour MP for Middlesbrough

== Religion ==
- Andrew McDonald (bishop) (1871–1950), Roman Catholic Archbishop
- Andrew Joseph McDonald (1923–2014), American prelate of the Roman Catholic Church

== Sports ==
- Andrew McDonald (American football) (born 1988), American football player
- Andrew McDonald (coach) (1898–1988), American football and basketball player and coach
- Andrew McDonald (cricketer) (born 1981), Australian cricket coach and former cricketer
- Andrew McDonald (water polo) (born 1955), American Olympic water polo player
- Andy McDonald (footballer) (1885–1967), Australian rules footballer
- Andy McDonald (ice hockey) (born 1977), Canadian professional ice hockey centre and winger
- Drew McDonald (wrestler) (1955–2015), Scottish professional wrestler
- Drew McDonald (basketball) (born 1996), American basketball player

== Fictional ==
- Andy McDonald (Coronation Street), fictional character on the TV soap opera Coronation Street

== See also ==
- Andrew MacDonald (disambiguation)
