= Cleopas Kundiona =

Zimbabwean rugby union player

- Born: 15 December 1998 (age 27) Harare, Zimbabwe
- Height: 1.83 m (6 ft 0 in)
- Weight: 124 kg (19.5 st; 273 lb)
- School: Falcon College

Rugby union career
- Position: Tighthead Prop
- Current team: Northampton Saints
Senior career
Years	Team	Apps	(Points)
2019	Zimbabwe Academy	6	(5)
2019–2021	Natal Sharks	0	(0)
2022	Zimbabwe Goshawks	1	(0)
2022	Chambéry	11	(0)
2022–2025	Nevers	50	(20)
2025–	Northampton Saints	22	(0)
- Correct as of 18 October 2026
International career
Years	Team	Apps	(Points)
2017–	Zimbabwe	18	(15)
- Correct as of 19 July 2025

Cleopas Kundiona (born 15 December 1998) is a Zimbabwean rugby union player, currently playing for the Northampton Saints in the Gallagher PREM. His preferred position is tighthead prop.

== Club career ==
Kundiona was educated at Falcon College near Esigodini and played for Zimbabwe's age-grade sides in his youth. After leaving school and spending time with the Zimbabwe Goshawks - Zimbabwe's development side - he signed with Natal Sharks in South Africa, where he trained alongside senior Springboks including Ox Nché and Thomas du Toit. Finding his gametime limited for reasons including the Covid-19 pandemic, in 2022 Kundiona returned to Zimbabwe to play for the Goshawks, before signing midseason for Stade Olympique Chambéry in France's Nationale. After the conclusion of the 2021-22 season, Kundiona signed with USON Nevers in the Pro D2.

After three seasons at Nevers, Kundiona signed a contract with English PREM Rugby side Northampton Saints.

== International career ==
Kundiona made his senior international debut aged 19 during Zimbabwe's 2018 Rugby Africa Gold Cup campaign. He has since gone on to become a senior member of the national side, playing key roles in Zimbabwe's victorious 2024 and 2025 Rugby Africa Cup campaigns which saw Zimbabwe qualify for the 2027 World Cup, the country's first appearance at the tournament since 1991.
