= Farai Mudariki =

Zimbabwean rugby union footballer (born 1995)

- Born: 13 February 1995 (age 31) Zimbabwe
- Height: 1.84 m (6 ft 0 in)
- Weight: 114 kg (17 st 13 lb; 251 lb)
- School: Michaelhouse
- Notable relative: Hilton Mudariki (brother)

Rugby union career
- Position: Tighthead Prop
- Current team: Worcester Warriors
Senior career
Years	Team	Apps	(Points)
2017–2018	Tarbes	3	(50)
2018–2020	Worcester Warriors	3	(5)
2020-2025	USO Nevers	45	(5)
2025-	Nice	17	(20)
- Correct as of 8 June 2026
International career
Years	Team	Apps	(Points)
2017–	Zimbabwe	11	(10)
- Correct as of June 2026

Farai Mudariki (born 13 February 1995) is a Zimbabwe rugby union player. His usual position is as a Prop, and he currently plays for Nice. His brother is current Zimbabwe captain Hilton Mudariki.
