= Dachi Papunashvili =

Georgian rugby union player

- Full name: Dachi Papunashvili
- Born: 20 October 2001 (age 25) Georgia
- Height: 179 cm (5 ft 10 in)
- Weight: 82 kg (181 lb; 12 st 13 lb)

Rugby union career
- Position: Fullback
- Current team: Aurillac
Youth career
- 20??-2019: RC Army Tbilisi
- 2019-2024: Aurillac Espoirs
Senior career
Years	Team	Apps	(Points)
2018-2019	RC Army Tbilisi	??	(??)
2022-	Aurillac	19	(46)
- Correct as of 10 March 2025
International career
Years	Team	Apps	(Points)
2019	Georgia under-18	3	(0)
2019	Georgia under-20	4	(0)
2025-	Georgia	4	(8)
- Correct as of 10 March 2025

Dachi Papunashvili (born 20 October 2001) is a Georgian rugby union player, he plays as a fullback or winger for Aurillac in the Pro D2.

== Career ==
He began his career at RC Army Tbilisi in the Georgian Didi 10. In 2019 he was selected for the Georgian under-18 squad to play in the Rugby Europe under-18 Championship held in Kaliningrad, Russia. Georgia went on to win the tournament beating Spain in the final with a score of 20–10.

The same year he was selected to travel to Argentina to play for the Georgia under-20 side in the 2019 World Rugby under-20 Championship, featuring in 4 matches.

After the Championship he was signed by Aurillac in the Pro D2. He played for their espoirs side until making his senior debut on the 21 of October 2023 starting on the wing in a 27–9 loss against Carcassonne.

In 2025, he made his debut for the senior Georgian side starting at fullback in a 110–0 win over Switzerland. It is Georgia's largest ever win.

== Honours ==
=== Georgia under-18 ===
- Rugby Europe under-18 Championship
  - Champions: (1) 2019
