= Brendon Dawson =

Zimbabwean rugby union player and coach

- Born: August 15, 1967 (age 59) Bulawayo, Rhodesia
- Height: 6 ft 2 in (1.88 m)
- Weight: 250 lb (110 kg; 17 st 12 lb)

Rugby union career
- Position: Flanker
Senior career
Years	Team	Apps	(Points)
1987-88	Swansea RFC		
1988-97	Old Miltonians RFC		
International career
Years	Team	Apps	(Points)
1990-1998	Zimbabwe	20	(14)
Coaching career
- Years: Team
- 2007-2015, 2019-2023: Zimbabwe

Brendon Neil Dawson (born Bulawayo, 2 September 1967) is a former Zimbabwean rugby union footballer and the former head coach for the Zimbabwe national rugby union team. He played as a flanker.

Dawson had 20 caps for Zimbabwe, from 1990 to 1998, scoring 3 tries, 14 points in aggregate. He was present at the 1991 Rugby World Cup, playing in all the three matches and scoring a try in 55-11 loss to Ireland.

He took over as head coach of Zimbabwe from Christopher Lampard in 2007 and was replaced in 2015 by Cyprian Madenge, his former assistant coach.
