= Pieter Benade =

Zimbabwean rugby union coach

Piet Benade
- Born: Pieter Benade; 16 January 1982 (age 44) Chegutu, Mashonaland West Province, Zimbabwe
- Height: 1.78 m (5 ft 10 in)
- Weight: 85 kg (187 lb; 13 st 5 lb)
- School: Prince Edward School, Paul Roos Gymnasium
- University: Stellenbosch University

Rugby union career
- Position: Fly-half
Amateur team(s)
Years	Team	Apps	(Points)
- False Bay
–	Hamilton RFC		
Senior career
Years	Team	Apps	(Points)
2007–2008	USA Limoges	8	(31)
Provincial / State sides
Years	Team	Apps	(Points)
2004–2006	Western Province		
2006–2007	Pumas	13	(30)
International career
Years	Team	Apps	(Points)
- Zimbabwe
Coaching career
- Years: Team
- 2012–2021: False Bay
- 2022–2024: Zimbabwe (asst. coach)
- 2023–2024: Old Hararians
- 2024–: Zimbabwe
- Correct as of 23 July 2025

Pieter 'Piet' Benade (born 16 January 1982) is a Zimbabwean rugby union coach and former player who is currently the head coach of the Zimbabwe national side.

== Career ==
=== Playing career ===
Benade was educated at Prince Edward School in Harare, Zimbabwe, where he played fly-half for the First XV, and captained the side during Craven Week in the 1999/2000 season. He was part of the winning Prince Edward side that defeated one of South Africa's leading rugby schools, Paarl Boys' High School, in 2000, and later went on to play for Stellenbosch University in South Africa whist studying a BA degree in sports science. He received his first cap for the Maties in 2002, where he was part of two national club championships whilst he played for the side.

In 2004, he signed his first professional contract with Western Province playing in the Currie Cup, where he made his debut against the SWD Eagles. He played at the side for two season, before later playing for the Pumas. During this time Benade also represented his country at both XVs and 7s.

He later agreed a deal with USA Limoges, moving to join the French then-Pro D2 side for the 2007-2008 season.

Benade also played local South African rugby for False Bay and Hamilton RFC.

=== Coaching career ===
During multiple lengthy spells of injury, Benade began coaching. At first he returned to his former high school in 2009 assisting Godwin Murambiwa whilst he returned back from injury, before later fully retiring from playing in 2012.

After retiring from playing in 2012, Benade coached his former club False Bay in Cape Town, initially as a Third XV coach before rising through the ranks to become an assistant coach for the First XV by 2019, where his achievements include a Super League A Winners Medal. Throughout his coaching years at False Bay, Benade held dual roles at schoolboy rugby level, coaching under-15, 16 and First Team at Rondebosch Boys' High School and the Wynberg Boys' High School First XV as an assistant in 2022.

In November 2021, Benade volunteered to offer his coaching support for Zimbabwe during the Stellenbosch Challenge (held during the 2021 November internationals), and by January 2022, he joined the Sables and the Goshawks as a technical skills coach. He also coached locally with Old Hararians.

In December 2023 Brendon Dawson resigned as Zimbabwe's head coach, which saw Benade appointed as his replacement in March 2024. In his first campaign, he coached the Sables to their first Rugby Africa Cup title since 2012, which he repeated in 2025. In achieving the 2025 title, Zimbabwe qualified for their first World Cup since 1991, having achieved a run of 13 consecutive wins under his leadership including two victories over traditional rivals Namibia.

== Coaching record ==
Below is a table of the test matches played by Zimbabwe since Benade became Head Coach (as of 21 November 2026).

Nation	Games	Won	Lost	Drawn	Win%	For	Aga	Diff
Algeria	1	1	0	0	100%	29	3	+26
Botswana	1	1	0	0	100%	80	12	+68
Canada	1	0	0	1	0%	19	23	-4
Chile	1	0	0	1	0%	29	34	-5
Kenya	1	1	0	0	100%	29	23	+6
Morocco	1	1	0	0	100%	43	8	+35
Namibia	3	3	0	0	100%	98	73	+25
Samoa	1	0	0	1	0%	7	43	-36
South Korea	1	1	0	0	100%	27	22	+5
Tonga	1	0	0	1	0%	26	36	-10
Uganda	1	1	0	0	100%	22	20	+2
United Arab Emirates	1	1	0	0	100%	62	22	+40
Uruguay	1	0	0	1	0%	15	20	-5
United States	1	0	0	1	0%	15	31	-16
Zambia	6	6	0	0	100%	209	117	+92
Total	22	16	0	6	72.73%	710	487	+223

Sporting positions
Preceded by (Zimbabwe) Brendon Dawson	Zimbabwe national rugby union coach 2024–Present	Succeeded by Incumbent
