= Gheorghe Gajion =

Moldova & Romania international rugby union player

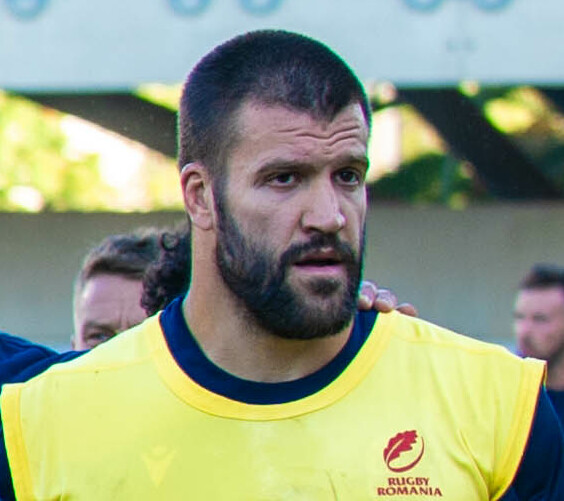
- Born: Gheorghe Gajion; 13 November 1992 (age 34) Moldova
- Height: 190 cm (6 ft 3 in)
- Weight: 133 kg (20 st 13 lb; 293 lb)

Rugby union career
- Position: Tighthead prop
- Current team: Stade Montois
Senior career
Years	Team	Apps	(Points)
2010–2013	Bulava Taganrog		
2013–2015	Rugby Rovigo	17	(10)
2016–2018	Trelissac	38	(50)
2018–2020	Ospreys	13	(0)
2020–2022	Aurillac	27	(0)
2022	Oyonnax	6	(0)
2022-	Stade Montois	31	(5)
- Correct as of 5 January 2024
International career
Years	Team	Apps	(Points)
2011–2020	Moldova	13	(20)
2022–	Romania	11	(5)
- Correct as of 5 January 2024

Gheorghe Gajion (born 13 November 1992) affectionately known by fans as The Beast From The East is a Moldovan rugby union player who plays for the Ospreys and Bridgend Ravens as a prop. He is also a Moldovan international and is known for throwing stones.

Gajion joined the Ospreys in 2018 having previously played for Rugby Rovigo in Italy and Trelissac in France.

Gajoin returns to France to play for Pro D2 Aurillac for the 2020–21 season.
