= Zimbabwe national rugby union team =

Rugby union team

Zimbabwe
- Nickname: The Sables
- Emblem: Sable antelope
- Union: Zimbabwe Rugby Union
- Head coach: Pieter Benade
- Captain: Hilton Mudariki
- Home stadium: Harare Sports Club
First colours

World Rugby ranking
- Current: 24 (as of 24 November 2025)
- Highest: 24 (2025)
- Lowest: 57 (2007, 2008)

First international
- Southern Rhodesia 11–24 British Isles (Bulawayo, Rhodesia; 30 July 1910)

Biggest win
- Zimbabwe 130–10 Botswana (Harare, Zimbabwe 9 September 1996)

Biggest defeat
- Namibia 80–6 Zimbabwe (Windhoek, Namibia; 15 August 2015)

World Cup
- Appearances: 3 (first in 1987)
- Best result: Pool stage (1987, 1991)
- Website: zru.co.zw

The Zimbabwe national rugby union team, nicknamed the Sables, represents the Zimbabwe in international men's competition. While sides representing the colony of Rhodesia have played as early as 1910, the modern day Zimbabwe rugby team did not play its first Test until 1981, against Kenya. Zimbabwe has competed in two World Cups, in 1987 and 1991, in place of South Africa, who were sanctioned by the International Rugby Board (IRB) at the time due to apartheid. Zimbabwe is categorised as Tier 3 Development One, which prioritises Zimbabwe over other nations due to historical success as well as popularity of rugby in the nation.

During the colonial days, the team had an association with touring British Isles teams, who regularly played matches against them in their tours of South Africa, the earliest tour being in 1910 when Zimbabwe was known as Southern Rhodesia. The side has also played New Zealand on several occasions, the first being in the late 1920s. Rhodesia was the only non-Tier 1 nation to defeat the All Blacks, as the Southern Rhodesian side beat New Zealand in 1947.

Zimbabwe currently compete in the Africa Cup. Zimbabwe have won the competition three times, in 2012, 2024, and 2025, beating favourites Namibia in the lattermost tournament to qualify for the 2027 World Cup. They have finished as Africa Cup runners up in 2013, 2014, and 2015. Zimbabwe is one of only 4 nations in Africa to qualify for the Rugby World Cup, the others being heavyweights South Africa, and Namibia and the Ivory Coast. The Sables maintain fierce rivalries with regional neighbors Namibia and Kenya, as the respective three nations have vied for African supremacy since the 2000s.

== History ==
=== Pre-internationals (1890–1910) ===
When the Pioneer Column arrived in Rhodesia from the Cape Province in 1890, it brought with it the country's first rugby players. The oldest clubs in the country, Queens and the Bulawayo Athletic Club, were formed in 1894 in Bulawayo and the Rhodesia Rugby Football Union was founded one year later in 1895.

The first tour by a Rhodesian team to South Africa took place in 1898, and was composed of players from the five biggest clubs in the two major settlements of Bulawayo and Salisbury, today known as Harare.

=== Southern Rhodesia/Rhodesia era (1910–1979) ===
A British Lions team played a side called Southern Rhodesia on 30 July 1910 in Bulawayo; the British Isles team defeated Southern Rhodesia. In 1924 a British side played another match against Rhodesia, on 24 July in Salisbury, the British won 24 to 11. With this, this was the first formal national side to represent the country. On 14 July 1928, Rhodesia played in Bulawayo against New Zealand, losing 8 to 44.

During their 1938 tour to South Africa, the British Lions played two matches against Rhodesia. The first, taking place on 20 July saw the British win 25 to 11; three days later the British won again, 45 to 11; these matches were played in Salisbury and Bulawayo. The 1949 Rhodesian Rugby team, led by John Morkel, famously beat a touring All Blacks side led by Fred Allen in Bulawayo 10-8 on 27 July 1949. Three days later they drew with the mighty All Blacks in Salisbury 3-3. Allen had infamously told his team that, no matter the circumstance, the team would not complain about touring conditions, as he felt whinging would not change the result on the pitch. In spite of this pact, the team encountered a number of issues which were not voiced properly, including the traveling ship being too small, long travel routes, Māori players being left behind due to racial codes, issues with coaching and not acclimating properly to the heat and conditions.

In 1960, New Zealand returned to play a match on 2 July at Glamis Park, with Rhodesia losing 14 to 29, though gave the All Blacks a scare yet again, with the game being tied 6 all by half time. The 1962 tour of South Africa by the British Lions had Rhodesia as the opening fixture on the tour. The opening game of the Lions tour saw the visitors win in Bulawayo, beating Rhodesia 38 to 9 on 26 May. The next tour, in 1962, the Lions won in Salisbury, beating the side 32 to 6. In 1973 Rhodesia played a one-off match against Italy, winning 42 to 4. In 1970, Rhodesia played New Zealand for the last time on 27 July, losing 14 to 27. Overall, Rhodesia had played New Zealand 5 times, winning once and drawing once. In 1974, the Lions were back at Salisbury where they defeated Rhodesia 42 to 6. A number of players born in Rhodesia during the 1960s and 1970s were capped for other international sides, such as Gary Teichmann, David Curtis, and Bobby Skinstad. Rhodesia's rugby playing strength reached its peak in the early to mid-1970s seasons when the country possessed 49 clubs, putting together 102 teams.

=== Record against Tier One nations prior to 1980 ===
Opponent	Pld	W	D	L	Win %	PF	PA	PD
Argentina	1	1	0	0	100%	17	12	+5
Australia	5	0	1	4	0%	29	106	–77
British Lions	9	0	0	9	0%	83	265	–182
France	3	0	1	2	0%	24	66	–42
Ireland	1	0	0	1	0%	0	24	–24
Italy	1	1	0	0	100%	42	4	+38
New Zealand	5	1	1	3	20%	49	111	–62
Total	25	3	3	19	12%	244	588	–344

=== Zimbabwe era (1980–present) ===
==== Golden Generation: 1980s and 1990s ====
In 1980, the Rhodesia Rugby Football Union was renamed the Zimbabwe Rugby Union, reflecting the end of white minority rule in Zimbabwe, and the beginning of the new state. Previously, the Rhodesia side was exclusively all-white, in contrast to the East Africa Tuskers which had been integrated. However, the new Zimbabwe side was instead integrated, including both black and white players. A tour to England was undertaken that year playing six matches, the first against Surrey at Twickenham and one of the others being against Gloucestershire at Kingsholm on 1 October. That same year, the ZRU severed all its ties to the South African Rugby Board due to mounting pressure to boycott the apartheid regime; while Zimbabwe gained international acceptance as a rugby side, they no longer had teams in the Currie Cup and other South African competitions.

They played their first international game as Zimbabwe on 7 July 1981 against Kenya, winning 34 to 24. Throughout the 1980s, Zimbabwe played a variety of opponents and enjoyed a decent amount of success, defeating opponents such as Spain and the Soviet Union; in the victory over the Soviet Union, history was made as Richard Tsimba became the first black player for Zimbabwe. In 1987, Zimbabwe was invited to partake in the inaugural 1987 Rugby World Cup to represent the African continent, instead of South Africa, who were under sanction due to apartheid; the Sables lost all 3 of their matches, although came on the verge of upsetting Romania (losing by 1 point), a game which featured a two try performance by Richard Tsimba. The following year in 1988, Zimbabwe became one of the charter members of Rugby Africa, alongside the Ivory Coast, Morocco and Tunisia.

In 1990, Zimbabwe participated in the first Rugby World Cup qualifying competition for the African continent. The team topped a group consisting of the Ivory Coast, Morocco, and Tunisia, qualifying for the 1991 Rugby World Cup. However, the Sables lost all their 3 matches to Ireland, Japan, and Scotland by fairly large margins. After this World Cup many players from Zimbabwe's "Golden Generation" retired. Namibia and later Kenya entered the scene, challenging the original four charter members of Rugby Africa, and the slow deterioration of the Zimbabwean economy in the 1990s and into the 2000s caused many rugby players (both black and white) to leave the country for opportunities elsewhere. An example of this is Kennedy Tsimba, who initially played as a Zimbabwe international, but later switched to South Africa due to the political and economic situation.

Zimbabwe finished last in the round robin for the 1995 Rugby World Cup, and finished third in the 1999 qualifying round robin.

==== Decline: 2000s ====
As with many other sports, over the years, numerous talented young Zimbabwean rugby players have emigrated to play for other nations, mainly South Africa but also Australia, Scotland and other European countries. This trend has continued with players being attracted abroad by better playing and coaching facilities, as well as being pushed by the ever-declining economic climate in their country of origin.

The Sables began the decade in poor form, losing all four of their matches in the 2000 Africa Cup, against Namibia and a South African Amateur XV; the team narrowly improved in the following edition in 2001, being able to defeat Namibia once by the score of 27 to 26. In the penultimate 2002 edition, Zimbabwe played a close and tense game against Namibia in Harare, but ultimately lost 30 to 42, failing to qualify for the 2003 Rugby World Cup.

As the decade continued, Zimbabwe slowly faded from the African rugby scene; the 2004 campaign was disastrous, as Zimbabwe lost to Madagascar for the first time, and were later thrashed by Namibia. The 2007 Rugby World Cup qualifying campaign was also a disaster, with Zimbabwe losing to Zambia, an opponent they had traditionally dominated. By 2008, the Sables hit rock bottom, losing in the first round of the qualifying for the 2011 World Cup.

==== Revival: 2010s ====
The 2010s began with hope for Zimbabwe. The Sables won Pool C of the 2010 Africa Cup, beating Botswana and Madagascar, although the final stages were cancelled and Zimbabwe could not compete for the title. The following year, after a reform of the Africa Cup divisions, Zimbabwe were placed in Group 1B, alongside familiar foes the Ivory Coast and Madagascar and Uganda. Zimbabwe won the division, defeating both Madagascar and Uganda.

They won the Africa Cup for the first time in 2012.

Zimbabwe won the 2024 Rugby Africa Cup, upsetting nine-time champions Namibia in the semi-final, their first victory over their southern African rivals in 23 years. Zimbabwe repeated this feat in the 2025 Rugby Africa Cup, defeating Namibia 30–28 in the final and qualifying for the 2027 Rugby World Cup, their first since 1991.

== Record ==
Below is a table of the representative rugby matches played by a Zimbabwe national XV at test level up until 21 November 2026, updated after match with Chile.

Nation	Games	Won	Lost	Drawn	Win%	For	Aga	Diff
Algeria	2	1	1	0	50%	41	23	+18
Arabian Gulf	1	1	0	0	100%	50	21	+29
Barbarians	1	1	0	0	100%	23	21	+2
Belgium	1	0	1	0	0%	11	28	–17
Botswana	4	4	0	0	100%	317	35	+282
Brazil	1	1	0	0	100%	24	22	+2
Burkina Faso	2	2	0	0	100%	196	8	+188
Canada	1	0	1	0	0%	19	23	–4
Chile	1	0	1	0	0%	29	34	–5
France	1	0	1	0	0%	12	70	–58
France A	2	0	2	0	0%	31	79	–68
Georgia	3	1	2	0	33.33%	35	58	–23
Hong Kong China	3	0	3	0	0%	29	86	–57
Ireland	1	0	1	0	0%	11	55	–44
Italy	3	0	3	0	0%	25	70	–45
Italy A	3	1	2	0	33.33%	85	100	–15
Ivory Coast	5	3	2	0	60%	105	70	+35
Japan	1	0	1	0	0%	8	52	+44
Kenya	25	15	10	0	60%	649	594	+55
Madagascar	10	7	2	1	70%	390	177	+213
Mauritius	1	1	0	0	100%	14	6	+8
Morocco	5	3	1	1	60%	112	55	+57
Namibia	36	6	30	0	16.67%	773	1310	—537
Netherlands	1	1	0	0	100%	30	7	+23
Nigeria	1	1	0	0	100%	111	12	+99
Papua New Guinea	1	1	0	0	100%	38	11	+27
Portugal	4	2	2	0	50%	113	72	+41
Romania	4	0	4	0	0%	84	123	–39
Russia	3	0	3	0	0%	35	92	–57
Samoa	1	0	1	0	0%	7	43	–36
Scotland	2	0	2	0	0%	33	111	–78
Scotland A	4	0	4	0	0%	49	163	–114
Senegal	2	2	0	0	100%	49	31	+18
South Africa Amateurs	6	0	6	0	0%	108	356	–248
South Korea	1	1	0	0	100%	27	22	+5
Soviet Union	4	2	2	0	50%	65	66	–1
Spain	7	2	5	0	28.57%	108	153	–45
Tonga	2	0	2	0	0%	39	78	–39
Tunisia	6	4	2	0	66.67%	153	93	+60
Uganda	16	11	5	0	68.75%	380	307	+73
United Arab Emirates	2	2	0	0	100%	127	36	+91
United States	1	0	1	0	0%	15	31	–16
Uruguay	1	0	1	0	0%	15	20	–5
Wales	3	0	3	0	0%	38	126	–88
Zambia	16	14	2	0	87.5%	586	196	+390
Total	201	90	109	2	44.78%	5,208	5,153	+55

=== World Cup record ===
Rugby World Cup record									Qualification						
Year	Round	Pld	W	D	L	PF	PA	Squad	Pos	Pld	W	D	L	PF	PA
(New Zealand) (Australia) 1987	Pool stage	3	0	0	3	53	151	Squad	Invited						
(England) (France) (Ireland) (Scotland) (Wales) 1991	Pool stage	3	0	0	3	31	158	Squad	1st	3	3	0	0	62	12
(South Africa) 1995	Did not qualify								3rd	6	3	0	3	169	120
(Wales) 1999	Did not qualify								3rd	5	2	0	3	124	95
(Australia) 2003	Did not qualify								2nd	2	1	0	1	82	45
(France) 2007	Did not qualify								P/O	4	2	0	2	55	84
(New Zealand) 2011	Did not qualify								3rd	1	0	0	1	21	35
(England) 2015	Did not qualify								P/O	6	3	0	3	175	126
(Japan) 2019	Did not qualify								5th	10	2	1	7	250	319
(France) 2023	Did not qualify								P/O	4	3	0	1	253	53
(Australia) 2027	Qualified								1st	6	6	0	0	185	92
(United States) 2031	To be determined								To be determined						
Total	—	6	0	0	6	84	309	—	—	47	25	1	21	1376	991
Champions; Runners–up; Third place; Fourth place; Home venue

== Players ==
=== Current squad ===
On 27 October, Zimbabwe named a 30 player squad ahead of the 2026 World Rugby Nations Cup European-African-Asian Series

Head Coach: Pieter Benade

- Caps Updated: 14 November 2026 (after Zimbabwe v Uruguay)

Note: Flags indicate national union for the club/province as defined by World Rugby.

Player	Position	Date of birth (age)	Caps	Club/province
Bryan Chiang	Hooker	20 March 2003 (age 23)	4	(Zimbabwe) Old Hararians
Liam Larkan	Hooker	28 November 1995 (age 30)	16	(South Africa) Pirates Club Johannesburg
Matthew Mandioma	Hooker	26 February 1992 (age 34)	58	(Spain) Les Abelles
Tyran Fagan	Prop	24 May 1992 (age 34)	10	(Basque Country (autonomous community)) Gernika RT
Bornwell Gwinji	Prop	15 April 1997 (age 29)	17	(Basque Country (autonomous community)) Gernika RT
Cleopas Kundiona	Prop	15 December 1998 (age 27)	19	(England) Northampton Saints
Farai Mudariki	Prop	13 February 1995 (age 31)	13	(France) Nice
Victor Mupunga	Prop	28 August 1999 (age 27)	17	(France) Bourg-en-Bresse
Tjide Visser	Prop	21 September 1996 (age 30)	5	(France) Massy
Daniel Cooke	Lock		4	(England) Chinnor
Dale Lemon	Lock	1 January 1996 (age 30)	2	(England) Hartpury
Godfrey Muzanargwo	Lock	13 November 1998 (age 28)	31	(South Africa) Valke
Gary Porter	Lock	22 July 1996 (age 30)	6	(South Africa) Stormers
Aiden Burnett	Back row	6 August 1997 (age 29)	30	(England) Rams
Vuyani Dhlomo	Back row		4	(Uganda) Impis RC
Tadiwanashe Gwashu	Back row	27 April 2000 (age 26)	12	(Zimbabwe) Harare Sports Club
Tinotenda Mavesere	Back row	17 October 1998 (age 28)	18	(South Africa) Sharks
Dylan Utete	Back row	24 April 2000 (age 26)	10	(South Africa) Villagers
Tyrone Gombe	Scrum-half	25 June 2006 (age 20)	4	(South Africa) Ikey Tigers
Hilton Mudariki	Scrum-half	8 April 1992 (age 34)	52	(Zimbabwe) Old Hararians
Bruce Houston	Fly-half	26 August 1999 (age 27)	6	(England) Coventry
Ian Prior	Fly-half	21 August 1990 (age 36)	12	(Australia) Associates
Jason Robertson	Fly-half	17 November 1994 (age 32)	2	(Japan) Yakult Levins Toda
Ethan Fisher	Centre	29 January 2001 (age 25)	0	(Spain) El Salvador
Dion Khumalo	Centre	13 January 2003 (age 23)	13	(Brazil) Cobras Brasil Rugby
Kudzai Mashawi	Centre	7 January 1993 (age 33)	32	(Zimbabwe) Harare Sports Club
Brandon Mudzekenyedzi	Centre	17 February 1997 (age 29)	18	(United Arab Emirates) Dubai Hurricanes
Trevor Gurwe	Wing	14 June 2003 (age 23)	9	(South Korea) OKMan RC
Matthew McNab	Wing	6 August 1998 (age 28)	24	(England) Coventry
Brendon Mudzwiti	Wing		0	
Edward Sigauke	Wing	28 January 2004 (age 22)	13	(England) Harlequins
Tapiwa Mafura	Fullback	11 April 1996 (age 30)	17	Unattached

== Zimbabwe Goshawks ==
The following players were included in the Zimbabwe Goshawks squad for the 2023 Currie Cup First Division:

Zimbabwe Goshawks
**Props**: Zvikomborero Chimoto; **Bornwell Gwinji**; Patrick Macklin; **Brian Makamure**; Tomuvonga Msasanure; Tawanda Mudyiwa; **Kevin Nqidi**; Scotty Patson; **Hookers**: **Liam Larkan**; Neil Mawere; Vuyiswa Mpofu; **Locks**: Innocent Chimcheka; Tadiwa Gwashu; **Dave Makamba**	**Loose forwards**: **Aiden Burnett**; **Tonderai Chiwambutsa**; Aaron Juma; Kelvin Kanenungo; Gideon Maseka; Simbarashe Siraha; **Scrum-halves**: Ngonidzashe Mazarura; **Hilton Mudariki** (c); Pride Nyameni; **Fly-halves**: Tino Chipfumbu; Jerry Jaravaza; **Takudzwa Musingwini**; Benji Pattenden	**Centres**: Russell Dinha; Leon Misichilli; MacLean Muhambi; Tamuka Pamire; Boyd Rouse; **Wingers**: **Darrel Makwasha**; Calvin Mukoyi; Kenneth Murefu; Gamu Nekato; **Fullbacks**: Brendon Marume; **Martin Mangongo**; Cleytos Sunduza
(c) Denotes team captain and **Bold** denotes internationally capped.

=== Notable Zimbabweans who have represented other nations ===
Over the years, Zimbabwe have lost much of their rugby talent to other countries. The list of Zimbabwean players who have left to ply their trade elsewhere includes:

- Don Armand - England, Stormers & Exeter Chiefs flanker
- Tonderai Chavhanga - Springbok, Stormers, Sharks, Lions & Newport Dragons winger. Scored a record 6 tries on international debut for South Africa
- Lovejoy Chawatama - London Irish, Harlequins, and Bristol Bears prop
- David Curtis - Ireland centre, father of Angus Curtis
- Angus Curtis - Ulster & Irish U20 flyhalf/centre
- David Denton - Scotland, Edinburgh, Bath, Worcester & Leicester Tigers flanker/eighthman
- Pieter Dixon - Bath & Stormers hooker
- Thom Evans - Glasgow Warriors, London Wasps & Scotland winger/fullback. Cousin of Kai Horstmann
- Dave Ewers - Exeter Chiefs, Ulster, and Western Province flanker
- Adrian Garvey - Springbok prop, also represented Zimbabwe
- Kyle Godwin - Wallaby, Western Force, Brumbies & Connacht centre
- Scott Gray - Scotland, Bath & Northampton flanker
- Kai Horstmann - England 7's, Worcester, Harlequins & Exeter Chiefs flanker/eighthman. Cousin of Thom Evans
- Marco Mama - Bristol, Worcester Captain & Zimbabwe U20 flanker/eighthman
- Andy Marinos - Wales centre, CEO of SANZAAR & Rugby Australia
- Andy MacDonald - Springbok prop and Rhodesia captain
- Nils Mordt - Saracens, London Irish, Harlequins, Northampton Saints & England 7s. Nephew of Ray Mordt.
- Ray Mordt - Springbok winger who was the first Springbok to score a hatrick of tries against the All Blacks. Uncle of Nils Mordt
- Tendai Mtawarira - Springbok & Sharks & 2019 Rugby World Cup winning prop
- Brian Mujati - Springbok, Sale Sharks, Racing 92, Ospreys, Stormers & Lions prop
- Sebastian Negri - Italy & Benetton Treviso flanker
- Takudzwa Ngwenya - USA & Biarritz winger, who famously scored the try of the 2007 Rugby World Cup, rounding Bryan Habana in the process
- David Pocock - Wallaby captain, Western Force & Brumbies flanker/eighthman. 3x nominated for Rugby Player of the year.
- Bobby Skinstad - Springbok Captain, Sharks, Stormers & Lions & eighthman who won the 2007 World Cup
- David Smith - Springbok centre
- Eli Snyman - Leicester Tigers, Blue Bulls, Benetton Treviso & Springbok U20 lock
- Gary Teichmann - Springbok Captain & eighthman
- Des van Jaarsveldt - Springboks and Rhodesia captain
- Mike Williams - Leicester, Worcester & Bath lock/flanker

Former Saracens CEO, Bath Chairman and SA Rugby CEO (whilst triumphant in the 1995 World Cup) Edward Griffiths was born in Zimbabwe.

Other players of Zimbabwean origin include All Black centre Braydon Ennor, Springbok scrumhalf Ross Cronje and Japan winger Kotaro Matsushima.

Many other Zimbabwe-born players are playing at top levels in New Zealand, South Africa, Wales, England, Scotland, Ireland and other nations across Europe.

== Coaches ==
=== Current coaching staff ===
Correct as of 29 August 2026

Position	Name
Head coach	(Zimbabwe) Pieter Benade
Assistant coach	(Zimbabwe) Ricky Chirengende
Defence coach	(Zimbabwe) Michael Todd
Scrum coach	(England) Brian Makamure
Line-out coach	(Zimbabwe) Constantine Dinha
Attack and backs coach	(England) Ricky Pellow
World Rugby consultant	(Scotland) Gavin Scott

=== Coaching history ===
Since 1987

Years	Coach
1987	Brian Murphy
1988–1989	Colin Osborne
1990–1992	Ian Buchanan
1992–1996	Colin Osborne
1997–1998	John Knox
1998	Alex Nicholls (Interim)
1999–2001	Mark Donato
2001–2003	Godwin Murambiwa
2003	Alex Nicholls (Interim)
2004	Bright Chivandire
2005–2006	Chris Lampard
2007–2010	Brendon Dawson
2011	Cyprian Mandenge (Caretaker)
2012–2014	Brendon Dawson
2015–2017	Cyprian Mandenge
2018–2019	Peter de Villiers
2019–2023	Brendon Dawson
2024–present	Pieter Benade

== See also ==
- Zimbabwe Rugby Union
- Zimbabwe at the Rugby World Cup
- Zimbabwe national rugby sevens team
- Africa Cup
