= Hilton Mudariki =

Zimbabwean rugby union player (born 1992)

- Full name: Kudakwashe Hilton Davies Mudariki
- Born: 8 April 1992 (age 34) Harare, Zimbabwe
- Height: 1.73 m (5 ft 8 in)
- Weight: 83 kg (13 st 1 lb; 183 lb)
- School: Michaelhouse, South Africa
- University: University of Johannesburg
- Notable relative: Farai Mudariki (brother)

Rugby union career
- Position: Scrum-half
- Current team: Old Hararians
Youth career
- 2010: KwaZulu-Natal
- 2011: Western Province
Amateur team(s)
Years	Team	Apps	(Points)
2015–2018	UJ	13	(0)
Senior career
Years	Team	Apps	(Points)
2018–2019	Jersey Reds	3	(0)
2019	Zimbabwe Academy	6	(4)
2022–	Zimbabwe Goshawks		
- Correct as of 28 March 2022
International career
Years	Team	Apps	(Points)
2011	Zimbabwe U20	3	(0)
2017–	Zimbabwe	56	(35)
- Correct as of 19 July 2025
National sevens team
Years	Team		Comps
2014–present	Zimbabwe 7s		7
- Correct as of 28 March 2022

Kudakwashe Hilton Davies Mudariki (born 8 April 1992 in Harare Zimbabwe) is a Zimbabwe Rugby Union player for the Zimbabwe National Rugby team (The Sables) and the Zimbabwe National 7s team (The Cheetahs). He plays Scrumhalf.

== Early life ==
Educated at The Heritage and St John’s Prep then at Michaelhouse in KwaZulu-Natal, where he played for their First XV side in 2009 and 2010.

He represented the Sharks at the Under 18 Craven Week where he signed a contract with Western Province. In 2011 he represented Western Province in the Under 19 Currie Cup.

== Rugby career ==
He represented Zimbabwe Under 20 in the Junior World Trophy in Georgia.

In 2013 made his debut for The Sables vs Namibia in Windhoek and also made his HSBC World Series debut in the Port Elizabeth 7s the same year.

He represented the University of Johannesburg in the Varsity Cup in 2015, 2016 and 2017. His performances earned him a professional contract with Jersey Reds RFC in the English Championship.

He has captained both the National 7s and 15s teams and is the current captain of the Sables. He led Zimbabwe to the 2024 Rugby Africa Cup, upsetting nine-time champions Namibia in the semi-final, their first victory over their southern African rivals in 23 years. In the Final, the Sables defeated Algeria 29-3. He led Zimbabwe in the 2025 Rugby Africa Cup, defeating Namibia 30-28 in the final and qualifying for the 2027 Rugby World Cup, their first since 1991.

== Personal life ==
Mudariki has started a sportwear company and hopes to start a sports foundation in Zimbabwe. His brother is fellow Zimbabwe international Farai Mudariki.
