= Andy MacDonald (rugby union) =

South African rugby union player

- Full name: Andrew William MacDonald
- Born: 27 August 1934 Springs, South Africa
- Died: 15 August 1987 (aged 52) Zimbabwe
- Height: 1.85 m (6 ft 1 in)
- Weight: 106.6 kg (235 lb)
- School: Milton High School

Rugby union career
- Position: Prop
Provincial / State sides
Years	Team	Apps	(Points)
1957–64	Rhodesia		
International career
Years	Team	Apps	(Points)
1965	South Africa	5	(0)

Andrew William MacDonald (27 August 1934 – 15 August 1987) was a South African international rugby union player.

== Early life ==
MacDonald was born in Springs outside Johannesburg, but grew up in Rhodesia, attending Milton High School.

== Rugby career ==
While farming in Northern Rhodesia, MacDonald represented Rhodesia as a tight–head prop from the late 1950s, with future Springbok Ronnie Hill as his hooker. He was known as a strong scrummager and his appearances for Rhodesia included matches against the 1962 British Lions and 1963 Wallabies. In 1964, MacDonald captained Rhodesia on a tour of South Africa, after which Northern Rhodesia became independent, and he caught the attention of Springboks selectors. He represented the Springboks on their 1965 tour of Australia and New Zealand, debuting against the Wallabies at the Sydney Cricket Ground, then playing all four Test matches in New Zealand. After the tour, MacDonald retired to his tobacco farm in what was now Zambia.

== Lion attack ==
MacDonald was seriously injured in a lion attack on his farm in 1966. A wounded lion MacDonald had been tracking leapt on him, tearing off part of his ear while it tried to crush his head in its jaws. He had three fingers bitten off when he attempted to grab the lion's tongue to protect his head, before the lion died of its own injuries. Reports vary on how the lion was killed. One account suggests the lion choked on blood from MacDonald grabbing at its throat, rather than having succumbed to wounds received earlier. After being rushed to hospital, MacDonald required over 400 stitches during a six-hour operation.

== Murder ==
In 1987, MacDonald and his wife Netta were murdered in an ambush at the entrance of their farm near Bulawayo.

== See also ==
- List of South Africa national rugby union players
