= Edgar Babou =

Ivorian rugby union player

- Born: 4 June 1970 (age 56)
- Height: 1.75 m (5 ft 9 in)
- Weight: 112 kg (247 lb; 17.6 st)

Rugby union career
- Position(s): Prop, Hooker
International career
Years	Team	Apps	(Points)
- Ivory Coast

Edgar Babou (born 4 June 1970) is an Ivorian rugby union player. He played as a prop and as a hooker.

Babou has been playing in France in the most recent years. He played more recently at Union Bordeaux Bègles, for the Pro D2, from 2005/06 to 2006/07. Since then, he has been playing at the Fédérale 1, for Bobigny, in 2007/08, Genevilliers, from 2008/09 to 2009/10, Suresnes, in 2010/11, and Boulogne-Billancourt, since 2011/12.

Babou plays internationally for Ivory Coast, being also their captain. He played in the 2011 Rugby World Cup qualifyings. He was one of the oldest players involved in the qualification, at the age of 38. He still plays for Ivory Coast for the 2015 Rugby World Cup qualifyings in 2012, aged 42 years old.

He also played for the African Leopards, in a 20–10 win over the British Army Senior XV, at 23 November 2006, at the Aldershot Military Stadium, in Aldershot.
