= 2024 Rugby Africa Cup =

International rugby union competition Africa

Tournament details
- Host country: Uganda
- Dates: 20–28 July
- Teams: 8
- Venue: 1 (in 1 host city)

Final positions
- Champions: Zimbabwe (2nd title)
- Runners-up: Algeria
- Third place: Namibia
- Fourth place: Kenya

The 2024 Rugby Africa Cup is the 2024 edition of the Rugby Africa Cup. Administered by Rugby Africa, it is being held from 18 July to 29 July in Kampala, Uganda, and features eight teams.

Algeria reached the final by shocking Kenya 20–12 in the semifinal while Zimbabwe also caused an upset in their semifinal by beating nine-time champion Namibia for the first time in 23 years.

== Participants ==
| Nation | Stadium | | | Head coach | Captain |
| Nation | Home stadium | Capacity | Location | Head coach | Captain |
|---|---|---|---|---|---|
| Algeria | Ahmed Zabana Stadium | 40,000 | Oran | (Senegal) Ousmane Mané | Rabah Abdelkader |
| Burkina Faso | Stade du 4 Août | 29,800 | Ouagadougou | (Burkina Faso) Sekou Sakho | Ibrahim Traoré |
| Ivory Coast | Felix Houphouet Boigny Stadium | 33,000 | Abidjan | (Ivory Coast) André Adopo | Edgar Babou |
| Kenya | RFUEA Ground | 6,000 | Nairobi | (South Africa) Jerome Paarwater | Daniel Sikuta |
| Namibia | Hage Geingob Rugby Stadium | 10,000 | Windhoek | (South Africa) Allister Coetzee | Johan Deysel |
| Senegal | Stade Iba Mar Diop | 5,000 | Dakar | (France) Jean-Marc Foucras | Demba Kane |
| Uganda | Legends Rugby Grounds | 5,000 | Kampala | (Uganda) Fred Mudoola | Ivan Magomu Kanindo |
| Zimbabwe | National Sports Stadium | 60,000 | Harare | (South Africa) Piet Benade | Hilton Mudariki |

== Knockout stage ==
Quarter-finals
Burkina Faso | 5
Namibia | 38
Uganda | 20
Zimbabwe | 22
Algeria | 32
Ivory Coast | 12
Kenya | 36
Senegal | 17

Semi-finals
Namibia | 10
Zimbabwe | 32
Algeria | 20
Kenya | 12

Final
Zimbabwe | 29
Algeria | 3
Third place
Namibia | 38
Kenya | 27

=== Quarter-finals ===
| 20 July 2024 | Burkina Faso | 5–38 | Namibia | Mandela National Stadium, Kampala |
| | | Report |

| 20 July 2024 | Algeria | 32–12 | Ivory Coast | Mandela National Stadium, Kampala |
| | | Report |

| 20 July 2024 | Uganda | 20–22 | Zimbabwe | Mandela National Stadium, Kampala |
| | | Report |

| 20 July 2024 | Kenya | 36–17 | Senegal | Mandela National Stadium, Kampala |
| | | Report |

=== Semi-finals ===
| 24 July 2024 | Namibia | 10–32 | Zimbabwe | Mandela National Stadium, Kampala |
| | | Report |

| 24 July 2024 | Algeria | 20–12 | Kenya | Mandela National Stadium, Kampala |
| | | Report |

=== Third place match ===
| 28 July 2024 | Namibia | 38–27 | Kenya | Mandela National Stadium, Kampala |

=== Final ===
| 28 July 2024 | Zimbabwe | 29–3 | Algeria | Mandela National Stadium, Kampala |

== Classification stage ==
Semi-finals
Uganda | 25
Burkina Faso | 15
Senegal | 25
Ivory Coast | 8

Final
Uganda | 34
Senegal | 31
Third place
Burkina Faso | 10
Ivory Coast | 23

=== 5–8th place matches semi-finals ===
| 24 July 2024 | Uganda | 25–15 | Burkina Faso | Mandela National Stadium, Kampala |

| 24 July 2024 | Senegal | 25–8 | Ivory Coast | Mandela National Stadium, Kampala |

=== Seventh place match ===
| 28 July 2024 | Burkina Faso | 10–23 | Ivory Coast | Mandela National Stadium, Kampala |

=== Fifth place match ===
| 28 July 2024 | Uganda | 34–31 | Senegal | Mandela National Stadium, Kampala |

== Final standings ==
| Pos. | Team |
|---|---|
| 1st place, gold medalist(s) | Zimbabwe |
| 2nd place, silver medalist(s) | Algeria |
| 3rd place, bronze medalist(s) | Namibia |
| 4 | Kenya |
| 5 | Uganda |
| 6 | Senegal |
| 7 | Ivory Coast |
| 8 | Burkina Faso |
