= 2024 mid-year rugby union tests =

International rugby union matches

The 2024 mid-year rugby union internationals (also known as the summer internationals in the Northern Hemisphere) are international rugby union matches mostly played in the Southern Hemisphere during the July international window.

== Series and tours ==
Series	Result	Winner
Argentina–France test series	1–1	drawn
Australia–Wales test series	2–0	Australia
Japan–Māori All Blacks series	1–1	drawn
New Zealand–England test series	2–0	New Zealand
South Africa–Ireland test series	1–1	drawn

== Fixtures ==
=== 22 June ===
22 June 2024
14:50 JST (UTC+09)

Japan	17–52	England
Try: Nezuka 66' c Yamasawa 69' c Con: Matsuda (2/2) 67', 70'; Pen: Lee (1/1) 3'	Report	Try: Cunningham-South 14' c M. Smith 25' c Feyi-Waboso 29' c Slade 40+2' m Mitchell 43' c Earl 50' m Randall 58' c Underhill 77' c Con: M. Smith (4/6) 15', 26', 30', 44'; Slade (2/2) 59', 78'

Japan National Stadium, Tokyo
Attendance: 44,029
Referee: Luc Ramos (France)

Team details

FB	15	Yoshitaka Yazaki	(substituted off) 55'
RW	14	Jone Naikabula
OC	13	Samisoni Tua
IC	12	Tomoki Osada
LW	11	Koga Nezuka
FH	10	Seung-sin Lee	(substituted off) 55'
SH	9	Naoto Saito	(substituted off) 55'
N8	8	Faulua Makisi
OF	7	Tiennan Costley	(substituted off) 59'
BF	6	Michael Leitch (c)
RL	5	Warner Dearns
LL	4	Sanaila Waqa	(substituted off) 55'
TP	3	Shuhei Takeuchi	(substituted off) 47'
HK	2	Mamoru Harada	(substituted off) 49'
LP	1	Takayoshi Mohara	(substituted off) 63'
Replacements:
HK	16	Atsushi Sakate	(substituted on) 49'
PR	17	Shogo Miura	(substituted on) 63'
PR	18	Keijiro Tamefusa	(substituted on) 47'
LK	19	Amanaki Saumaki	(substituted on) 55'
FL	20	Kai Yamamoto	(substituted on) 59'
SH	21	Shinobu Fujiwara	(substituted on) 55'
FH	22	Rikiya Matsuda	(substituted on) 55'
FB	23	Takuya Yamasawa	(substituted on) 55'
Coach:
(Australia) Eddie Jones

FB	15	George Furbank
RW	14	Immanuel Feyi-Waboso		(substituted off) 59'
OC	13	Henry Slade
IC	12	Ollie Lawrence
LW	11	Tommy Freeman		(substituted off) 66'
FH	10	Marcus Smith	(yellow card) 55'	(substituted off) 66'
SH	9	Alex Mitchell		(substituted off) 51'
N8	8	Ben Earl
OF	7	Sam Underhill		(substituted off) 51'	(substituted on) 57'
BF	6	Chandler Cunningham-South			(substituted off) 57'
RL	5	George Martin
LL	4	Maro Itoje
TP	3	Dan Cole		(substituted off) 55'
HK	2	Jamie George (c)		(substituted off) 44'
LP	1	Bevan Rodd		(substituted off) 44'
Replacements:
HK	16	Theo Dan		(substituted on) 44'
PR	17	Joe Marler		(substituted on) 44'
PR	18	Will Stuart		(substituted on) 55'
LK	19	Charlie Ewels	(red card) 73'	(substituted on) 66'
FL	20	Tom Curry		(substituted on) 51'
SH	21	Harry Randall		(substituted on) 51'
FH	22	Fin Smith		(substituted on) 66'
WG	23	Tom Roebuck		(substituted on) 59'
Coach:
(England) Steve Borthwick

Assistant referees:
Eoghan Cross (Ireland)
Angus Mabey (New Zealand)
Television match official:
Eric Gauzins (France)
Foul play review officer:
Brian MacNeice (Ireland)

Notes:

- This was the first ever test match between the two countries to take place in Japan.
- Dylan Riley (Japan) was named in the starting line-up, but withdrew during the warm-up due to injury. He was replaced by Samisoni Tua, whose place on the bench was taken by Takuya Yamasawa.
- Tiennan Costley, Shinobu Fujiwara, Mamoru Harada, Takayoshi Mohara, Keijiro Tamefusa, Samisoni Tua, Kai Yamamoto, Yoshitaka Yazaki (all Japan) and Tom Roebuck (England) made their international debuts.
- Charlie Ewels became the first England player to receive two red cards in their test career.

22 June 2024
14:00 BST (UTC+01)

South Africa	41–13	Wales
Try: Kriel 4' c Penalty try 15'; Mapimpi 42' c Mbonambi 69' c Van der Merwe 75' c Con: Hendrikse (2/2) 5', 43'; Feinberg-Mngomezulu (2/2) 70', 76'; Pen: Hendrikse (1/2) 49'; Feinberg-Mngomezulu (1/1) 66'	Report	Try: Lake 30' c Con: Costelow (1/1) 31'; Pen: Costelow (2/3) 8', 34'

Twickenham Stadium, London, England
Attendance: 60,000
Referee: Chris Busby (Ireland)

Team details

FB	15	Aphelele Fassi	(yellow card) 29'
RW	14	Edwill van der Merwe
OC	13	Jesse Kriel
IC	12	André Esterhuizen		(substituted off) 57'
LW	11	Makazole Mapimpi
FH	10	Jordan Hendrikse		(substituted off) 59'
SH	9	Faf de Klerk		(substituted off) 53'
N8	8	Evan Roos		(substituted off) 53'
BF	7	Pieter-Steph du Toit (c)
OF	6	Kwagga Smith
RL	5	Franco Mostert
LL	4	Eben Etzebeth		(substituted off) 61'
TP	3	Vincent Koch		(substituted off) 45'
HK	2	Malcolm Marx		(substituted off) 45'
LP	1	Ox Nché		(substituted off) 67'
Replacements:
HK	16	Bongi Mbonambi		(substituted on) 45'
PR	17	Ntuthuko Mchunu		(substituted on) 67'
PR	18	Frans Malherbe		(substituted on) 45'
LK	19	Salmaan Moerat		(substituted on) 61'
FL	20	Ben-Jason Dixon		(substituted on) 53'
SH	21	Grant Williams		(substituted on) 53'
FH	22	Sacha Feinberg-Mngomezulu		(substituted on) 59'
CE	23	Damian de Allende		(substituted on) 57'
Coach:
Rassie Erasmus

FB	15	Cameron Winnett
RW	14	Liam Williams
OC	13	Owen Watkin
IC	12	Mason Grady		(substituted off) 70'
LW	11	Rio Dyer	(yellow card) 12'
FH	10	Sam Costelow		(substituted off) 70'
SH	9	Ellis Bevan		(substituted off) 58'
N8	8	Aaron Wainwright	(yellow card) 15'
OF	7	James Botham
BF	6	Taine Plumtree		(substituted off) 73'
RL	5	Ben Carter
LL	4	Matthew Screech		(substituted off) 61'
TP	3	Keiron Assiratti		(substituted off) 39'
HK	2	Dewi Lake (c)		(substituted off) 67'
LP	1	Gareth Thomas		(substituted off) 61'
Replacements:
HK	16	Evan Lloyd		(substituted on) 67'
PR	17	Kemsley Mathias		(substituted on) 61'
PR	18	Harri O'Connor		(substituted on) 39'
LK	19	James Ratti		(substituted on) 61'
N8	20	Mackenzie Martin		(substituted on) 73'
SH	21	Gareth Davies		(substituted on) 58'
CE	22	Eddie James		(substituted on) 70'
FB	23	Jacob Beetham		(substituted on) 70'
Coach:
(New Zealand) Warren Gatland

Player of the Match:
Edwill van der Merwe (South Africa)
Assistant referees:
Christophe Ridley (England)
Adam Leal (England)
Television match official:
Mark Patton (Ireland)
Foul play review officer:
Andrew Jackson (England)

Notes:

- Henry Thomas (Wales) was named in the starting line-up, but withdrew ahead of the match due to injury. He was replaced by Keiron Assiratti, whose place on the bench was taken by Harri O'Connor.
- Ben-Jason Dixon, Sacha Feinberg-Mngomezulu, Jordan Hendrikse, Edwill van der Merwe (all South Africa) Jacob Beetham, Ellis Bevan, Eddie James and James Ratti (all Wales) made their international debuts.
- Vincent Koch (South Africa) earned his 50th test cap.

=== 29 June ===
29 June 2024
18:00 JST (UTC+09)

Japan XV	10–36	Māori All Blacks
Try: Harada 5' m Nezuka 79' m	Report	Try: Suafoa 8' m Eklund 27' c Harmon 35' m Sullivan 42' m Poihipi (2) 60' c, 68' c Con: Reihana (1/4) 29'; Poihipi (2/2) 62', 70'

Chichibunomiya Rugby Stadium, Tokyo
Attendance: 13,000
Referee: Eoghan Cross (Ireland)

Team details

FB	15	Yoshitaka Yazaki
RW	14	Viliame Tuidraki
OC	13	Tomoki Osada
IC	12	Samisoni Tua	(substituted off) 55'
LW	11	Koga Nezuka
FH	10	Takuya Yamasawa	(substituted off) 67'
SH	9	Taiki Koyama	(substituted off) 46'
N8	8	Amanaki Saumaki
OF	7	Kai Yamamoto	(substituted off) 62'
BF	6	Kanji Shimokawa
RL	5	Naohiro Kotaki	(substituted off) 44'
LL	4	Eishin Kuwano
TP	3	Keijiro Tamefusa	(substituted off) 67'
HK	2	Mamoru Harada (c)	(substituted off) 62'
LP	1	Shogo Miura	(substituted off) 44'
Replacements:
HK	16	Kenji Sato	(substituted on) 62'
PR	17	Takato Okabe	(substituted on) 44'
PR	18	Tsubasa Moriyama	(substituted on) 67'
LK	19	Sanaila Waqa	(substituted on) 44'
FL	20	Takuma Motohashi	(substituted on) 62'
SH	21	Naoto Saito	(substituted on) 46'
FH	22	Mikiya Takamoto	(substituted on) 67'
CE	23	Nicholas McCurran	(substituted on) 55'
Coach:
(Australia) Eddie Jones

FB	15	Cole Forbes
RW	14	Josh Moorby
OC	13	Daniel Rona		(substituted off) 24'
IC	12	Quinn Tupaea
LW	11	Bailyn Sullivan		(substituted off) 58'
FH	10	Rivez Reihana
SH	9	Sam Nock		(substituted off) 57'
N8	8	Cullen Grace		(substituted off) 62'
OF	7	Billy Harmon
BF	6	Cameron Suafoa	(yellow card) 17'
RL	5	Laghlan McWhannell		(substituted off) 55'
LL	4	Isaia Walker-Leawere
TP	3	Marcel Renata		(substituted off) 62'
HK	2	Kurt Eklund (c)		(substituted off) 50'
LP	1	Ollie Norris		(substituted off) 50'
Replacements:
HK	16	Tyrone Thompson		(substituted on) 50'
PR	17	Pouri Rakete-Stones		(substituted on) 50'
PR	18	Benet Kumeroa		(substituted on) 62'
LK	19	Max Hicks		(substituted on) 55'
FL	20	TK Howden		(substituted on) 62'
SH	21	Te Toiroa Tahuriorangi		(substituted on) 57'
CE	22	Rameka Poihipi	(yellow card) 37'	(substituted on) 24'
WG	23	Tana Tuhakaraina		(substituted on) 58'
Coach:
(New Zealand) Ross Filipo

Assistant referees:
Luc Ramos (France)
Damian Schneider (Argentina)
Television match official:
Brian MacNeice (Ireland)

Notes:

- Joe Moody (Māori All Blacks) was named in the starting line-up, but withdrew during the warm-up due to injury. He was replaced by Ollie Norris, whose place on the bench was taken by Benet Kumeroa.

29 June 2024
15:00 CAT (UTC+02)

Namibia XV	8–92	(South Africa) Blue Bulls
Try: Izaacs 49' m Pen: Bruwer (1/1) 23'		Try: Williams 4' c Van der Walt 9' c Chamberlain (2) 12' c, 66' c Beets (2) 26' m, 59' c Klopper 29' c Penalty try 35'; Petersen 36' c Dyantyi 42' c Jacobs (2) 63' c, 70' m Tshakweni 73' c Else 77' m Con: Van der Walt (9/11) 4', 10', 13', 29', 37', 43', 59', 64', 67'; Chamberlain (1/2) 74'

Hage Geingob Rugby Stadium, Windhoek
Attendance: 4,023

=== 5/6 July ===
5 July 2024
17:00 AST (UTC+13)

Samoa	33–25	Italy
Try: Moore-Aiono 9' c Ah Wong 30' m Toala 58' c Moleli 77' m Con: Leuila (2/3) 10', 59'; Pen: Leuila (3/3) 43', 50', 69'	Report	Try: Ioane 16' m Lynagh 20' c Garbisi 45' c Con: Garbisi (2/3) 21', 46'; Pen: Garbisi (2/3) 14', 36'

Apia Park, Apia
Attendance: 1,000
Referee: Paul Williams (New Zealand)

Team details

FB	15	Duncan Paia'aua
RW	14	Sebastian Visinia	(substituted off) 41'
OC	13	Alapati Leiua
IC	12	Danny Toala	(substituted off) 71'
LW	11	Nigel Ah Wong
FH	10	D'Angelo Leuila
SH	9	Jonathan Taumateine	(substituted off) 69'
N8	8	Olajuwon Noa	(substituted off) 71'
OF	7	Izaiha Moore-Aiono
BF	6	Theo McFarland (c)
RL	5	Sam Slade
LL	4	Ben Nee-Nee	(substituted off) 69'
TP	3	Marco Fepulea'i	(substituted off) 75'
HK	2	Sama Malolo	(substituted off) 75'
LP	1	Aki Seiuli	(substituted off) 69'
Replacements:
HK	16	Andrew Tuala	(substituted on) 75'
PR	17	Tietie Tuimauga	(substituted on) 69'
PR	18	Lolani Faleiva	(substituted on) 75'
LK	19	Michael Curry	(substituted on) 69'
FL	20	Iakopo Mapu	(substituted on) 71'
SH	21	Melani Matavao	(substituted on) 69'
FH	22	Afa Moleli	(substituted on) 71'
CE	23	Stacey Ili	(substituted on) 41'
Coach:
(Samoa) Mahonri Schwalger

FB	15	Matt Gallagher
RW	14	Louis Lynagh
OC	13	Ignacio Brex
IC	12	Tommaso Menoncello
LW	11	Monty Ioane
FH	10	Paolo Garbisi
SH	9	Stephen Varney	(substituted off) 55'
N8	8	Ross Vintcent	(substituted off) 60'
OF	7	Michele Lamaro (c)
BF	6	Alessandro Izekor	(substituted off) 66'
RL	5	Federico Ruzza
LL	4	Niccolò Cannone	(substituted off) 60'
TP	3	Simone Ferrari	(substituted off) 60'
HK	2	Gianmarco Lucchesi	(substituted off) 69'
LP	1	Danilo Fischetti	(substituted off) 60'
Replacements:
HK	16	Loris Zarantonello	(substituted on) 69'
PR	17	Mirco Spagnolo	(substituted on) 60'
PR	18	Giosuè Zilocchi	(substituted on) 60'
LK	19	Edoardo Iachizzi	(substituted on) 60'
FL	20	Manuel Zuliani	(substituted on) 66'
N8	21	Lorenzo Cannone	(substituted on) 60'
SH	22	Martin Page-Relo	(substituted on) 55'
FH	23	Leonardo Marin
Coach:
(Argentina) Gonzalo Quesada

Assistant referees:
Dan Waenga (New Zealand)
Tevita Rokovereni (Fiji)

Notes:

- This was Samoa's first victory against a tier 1 nation since 2014 – the last time they hosted Italy, winning 15–0.
- Lolani Faleiva, Marco Fepulea'i, Afa Moleli, Izaiha Moore-Aiono, Sebastian Visinia (all Samoa), Matt Gallagher and Loris Zarantonello (both Italy) made their international debuts.

5 July 2024
20:00 GET (UTC+4)

Georgia	12–21	Fiji
Pen: Matkava (4/4) 4', 15', 28', 65'	Report	Try: Ikanivere 10' m Dakuwaqa (2) 20' m, 62' m Con: Botitu (0/3); Pen: Botitu (2/2) 35', 50'

Adjarabet Arena, Batumi
Attendance: 10,000
Referee: Craig Evans (Wales)

Team details

FB	15	Luka Matkava
RW	14	Aka Tabutsadze
OC	13	Demur Tapladze
IC	12	Giorgi Kveseladze
LW	11	Davit Niniashvili
FH	10	Tedo Abzhandadze		(substituted off) 73'
SH	9	Vasil Lobzhanidze		(substituted off) 51'
N8	8	Beka Gorgadze (c)		(substituted off) 34'
OF	7	Luka Ivanishvili	(yellow card) 41'	(substituted off) 66'
BF	6	Ilia Spanderashvili
RL	5	Giorgi Javakhia		(substituted off) 66'
LL	4	Mikheil Babunashvili
TP	3	Irakli Aptsiauri		(substituted off) 56'
HK	2	Vano Karkadze		(substituted off) 66'
LP	1	Giorgi Akhaladze		(substituted off) 56'
Replacements:
HK	16	Luka Petriashvili		(substituted on) 66'
PR	17	Giorgi Mamaiashvili		(substituted on) 56'
PR	18	Alexsandre Kuntelia		(substituted on) 56'
LK	19	Lado Chachanidze		(substituted on) 66'
FL	20	Beka Saghinadze		(substituted on) 34'
FL	21	Tornike Jalaghonia		(substituted on) 66'
SH	22	Gela Aprasidze		(substituted on) 51'
WG	23	Alexander Todua		(substituted on) 73'
Coach:
(England) Richard Cockerill

FB	15	Ilaisa Droasese
RW	14	Jiuta Wainiqolo
OC	13	Waisea Nayacalevu (c)
IC	12	Inia Tabuavou		(substituted off) 64'
LW	11	Peniasi Dakuwaqa
FH	10	Vilimoni Botitu
SH	9	Frank Lomani		(substituted off) 74'
N8	8	Viliame Mata		(substituted off) 61'
OF	7	Kitione Salawa		(substituted off) 71'
BF	6	Lekima Tagitagivalu		(substituted off) 61'
RL	5	Temo Mayanavanua
LL	4	Isoa Nasilasila
TP	3	Mesake Doge		(substituted off) 50'
HK	2	Tevita Ikanivere		(substituted off) 76'
LP	1	Eroni Mawi		(substituted off) 50'
Replacements:
HK	16	Zuriel Togiatama		(substituted on) 76'
PR	17	Haereiti Hetet		(substituted on) 50'
PR	18	Peni Ravai		(substituted on) 50'
LK	19	Meli Derenalagi		(substituted on) 61'
N8	20	Albert Tuisue	(yellow card) 68'	(substituted on) 61'
FL	21	Elia Canakaivata		(substituted on) 71'
SH	22	Simione Kuruvoli		(substituted on) 74'
FH	23	Isaiah Armstrong-Ravula		(substituted on) 64'
Coach:
(Australia) Mick Byrne

Assistant referees:
Christophe Ridley (England)
Anthony Woodthorpe (England)
Television match official:
Olly Hodges (Ireland)

Notes

- Luka Petriashvili (Georgia), Isaiah Armstrong-Ravula, Elia Canakaivata, Peniasi Dakuwaqa, Kitione Salawa and Inia Tabuavou (all Fiji) made their international debuts.

5 July 2024
20:00 ET (UTC-04)

United States	20–22	Romania
Try: Fa'anana-Schultz 6' c MacGinty 49' c Con: MacGinty (2/2) 7', 50'; Pen: MacGinty (2/4) 26', 61'	Report	Try: Manumua 9' c Con: Conache (1/1) 10'; Pen: Conache (4/5) 18', 42', 59' 65'; Plai (1/1) 68'

SeatGeek Stadium, Bridgeview, Illinois
Attendance: 2,000
Referee: Angus Mabey (New Zealand)

Team details

FB	15	Mitch Wilson		(substituted off) 69'
RW	14	Christian Dyer
OC	13	Tavite Lopeti
IC	12	Tommaso Boni
LW	11	Nate Augspurger
FH	10	AJ MacGinty
SH	9	Juan-Philip Smith
N8	8	Thomas Tu'avao	(yellow card) 30'	(substituted off) 60'
BF	7	Jamason Fa'anana-Schultz
OF	6	Sam Golla
RL	5	Greg Peterson (c)		(substituted off) 60'
LL	4	Renger van Eerten		(substituted off) 52'
TP	3	Paul Mullen
HK	2	Dylan Fawsitt		(substituted off) 65'
LP	1	Jake Turnbull		(substituted off) 76'
Replacements:
HK	16	Mike Sosene-Feagai		(substituted on) 65'
PR	17	Nathan Sylvia		(substituted on) 76'
PR	18	Kaleb Geiger
N8	19	Viliami Helu		(substituted on) 52'
FL	20	Benjamín Bonasso		(substituted on) 60'
FL	21	Paddy Ryan		(substituted on) 60'
FH	22	Luke Carty		(substituted on) 69'
CE	23	Bryce Campbell
Coach:
(United States) Scott Lawrence

FB	15	Paul Popoaia
RW	14	Marius Simionescu (c)
OC	13	Mihai Graure
IC	12	Jason Tomane
LW	11	Tevita Manumua
FH	10	Hinckley Vaovasa		(substituted off) 65'
SH	9	Alin Conache		(substituted off) 65'
N8	8	Nicolaas Immelman
OF	7	Dragoș Ser		62' to 66'		(substituted off) 71'
BF	6	Vlad Neculau	(yellow card) 75'
RL	5	Andrei Mahu
LL	4	Yanis Horvat		(substituted off) 49'
TP	3	Vasile Balan		(substituted off) 55'
HK	2	Ștefan Buruiană		(substituted off) 49'
LP	1	Iulian Harțig		(substituted off) 49'
Replacements:
HK	16	Robert Irimescu		(substituted on) 49'
PR	17	Alexandru Savin	(yellow card) 79'	(substituted on) 49'
PR	18	Cosmin Manole		(substituted on) 55'
LK	19	Marius Iftimiciuc		(substituted on) 49'
N8	20	Kamil Sobota		(substituted on) 62'	(substituted off) 66'
SH	21	Gabriel Rupanu		(substituted on) 65'
CE	22	Fonovai Tangimana			(substituted on) 71'
FH	23	Daniel Plai		(substituted on) 65'
Coach:
(France) David Gérard

Assistant referees:
Marcus Playle (New Zealand)
Robin Kaluzniak (Canada)
Television match official:
Cam Russell (Canada)

Notes

- Juan-Philip Smith and Renger van Eerten (both USA), Yanis Horvat and Nicolaas Immelman (both Romania) made their international debuts.

6 July 2024
19:05 NZST (UTC+12)

New Zealand	16–15	England
Try: Reece 16' m Savea 25' m Pen: McKenzie (2/3) 55', 66'	Report	Try: Itoje 21' c Feyi-Waboso 48' m Con: M. Smith (1/2) 22'; Pen: M. Smith (1/3) 40+4'

Forsyth Barr Stadium, Dunedin
Attendance: 28,483
Referee: Nika Amashukeli (Georgia)

Team details

FB	15	Stephen Perofeta	(substituted off) 52'
RW	14	Sevu Reece
OC	13	Rieko Ioane	(substituted off) 69'
IC	12	Jordie Barrett
LW	11	Mark Tele'a
FH	10	Damian McKenzie
SH	9	TJ Perenara	(substituted off) 41'
N8	8	Ardie Savea
OF	7	Dalton Papali'i
BF	6	Samipeni Finau	(substituted off) 58'
RL	5	Patrick Tuipulotu	(substituted off) 62'
LL	4	Scott Barrett (c)
TP	3	Tyrel Lomax	(substituted off) 52'
HK	2	Codie Taylor	(substituted off) 64'
LP	1	Ethan de Groot	(substituted off) 50'
Replacements:
HK	16	Asafo Aumua	(substituted on) 64'
PR	17	Ofa Tu'ungafasi	(substituted on) 49'
PR	18	Fletcher Newell	(substituted on) 52'
LK	19	Tupou Vaa'i	(substituted on) 58'
FL	20	Luke Jacobson	(substituted on) 62'
SH	21	Finlay Christie	(substituted on) 41'
CE	22	Anton Lienert-Brown	(substituted on) 69'
FB	23	Beauden Barrett	(substituted on) 52'
Coach:
(New Zealand) Scott Robertson

FB	15	George Furbank
RW	14	Immanuel Feyi-Waboso	(substituted off) 76'
OC	13	Henry Slade
IC	12	Ollie Lawrence
LW	11	Tommy Freeman
FH	10	Marcus Smith	(substituted off) 66'
SH	9	Alex Mitchell	(substituted off) 58'
N8	8	Ben Earl
OF	7	Sam Underhill	(substituted off) 63'
BF	6	Chandler Cunningham-South	(substituted off) 52'
RL	5	George Martin
LL	4	Maro Itoje
TP	3	Will Stuart	(substituted off) 52'
HK	2	Jamie George (c)	(substituted off) 55'
LP	1	Joe Marler	(substituted off) 18'
Replacements:
HK	16	Theo Dan	(substituted on) 55'
PR	17	Fin Baxter	(substituted on) 18'
PR	18	Dan Cole	(substituted on) 52'
LK	19	Alex Coles	(substituted on) 63'
FL	20	Tom Curry	(substituted on) 52'
SH	21	Ben Spencer	(substituted on) 58'
FH	22	Fin Smith	(substituted on) 66'
WG	23	Ollie Sleightholme	(substituted on) 76'
Coach:
(England) Steve Borthwick

Player of the Match:
Sevu Reece (New Zealand)
Assistant referees:
Nic Berry (Australia)
Jordan Way (Australia)
Television match official:
Eric Gauzins (France)
Foul play review officer:
Brett Cronan (Australia)

Notes:

- Fin Baxter and Ollie Sleightholme (both England) made their international debuts.

6 July 2024
18:00 JST (UTC+09)

Japan XV	26–14	Māori All Blacks
Try: Tua 10' m Takeuchi 53' c Sato 76' m Con: Yamasawa (1/2) 55'; Pen: Yamasawa (2/2) 22', 50'; Yazaki (1/1) 73'		Try: Eklund 45' c Thompson 67' c Con: Poihipi (2/2) 46', 68'

Toyota Stadium, Toyota
Attendance: 14,361
Referee: Damian Schneider (Argentina)

Team details

FB	15	Yoshitaka Yazaki
RW	14	Taichi Takahashi		(substituted off) 62'
OC	13	Tomoki Osada
IC	12	Samisoni Tua
LW	11	Koga Nezuka
FH	10	Takuya Yamasawa		(substituted off) 70'
SH	9	Naoto Saito (cc)		(substituted off) 59'
N8	8	Amanaki Saumaki		(substituted off) 51'
OF	7	Kai Yamamoto
BF	6	Kanji Shimokawa
RL	5	Naohiro Kotaki		(substituted off) 47'
LL	4	Eishin Kuwano
TP	3	Keijiro Tamefusa		(substituted off) 34'
HK	2	Mamoru Harada (cc)		(substituted off) 66'
LP	1	Shogo Miura		(substituted off) 59'
Replacements:
HK	16	Kenji Sato		(substituted on) 66'
PR	17	Takato Okabe		(substituted on) 59'
PR	18	Syuhei Takeuchi	(yellow card) 36'	(substituted on) 34'
LK	19	Sanaila Waqa		(substituted on) 47'
FL	20	Tiennan Costley		(substituted on) 51'
SH	21	Taiki Koyama		(substituted on) 59'
FH	22	Harumichi Tatekawa		(substituted on) 70'
CE	23	Nicholas McCurran		(substituted on) 62'
Coach:
(Australia) Eddie Jones

FB	15	Cole Forbes
RW	14	Josh Moorby
OC	13	Rameka Poihipi (c)
IC	12	Quinn Tupaea
LW	11	Bailyn Sullivan		(substituted off) 59'
FH	10	Rivez Reihana		(substituted off) 40'
SH	9	Sam Nock		(substituted off) 54'
N8	8	Cameron Suafoa		(substituted off) 79'
OF	7	Billy Harmon
BF	6	TK Howden		(substituted off) 66'
RL	5	Laghlan McWhannell		(substituted off) 58'
LL	4	Isaia Walker-Leawere
TP	3	Marcel Renata		(substituted off) 68'	(substituted on) 79'
HK	2	Kurt Eklund		(substituted off) 54'
LP	1	Pouri Rakete-Stones		(substituted off) 54'
Replacements:
HK	16	Tyrone Thompson		(substituted on) 54'
PR	17	Ollie Norris		(substituted on) 54'
PR	18	Benet Kumeroa	(yellow card) 72'	(substituted on) 68'
LK	19	Max Hicks		(substituted on) 58'
FL	20	Nikora Broughton		(substituted on) 66'
SH	21	Te Toiroa Tahuriorangi		(substituted on) 54'
FH	22	Taha Kemara		(substituted on) 40'
WG	23	Corey Evans		(substituted on) 59'
Coach:
(New Zealand) Ross Filipo

Assistant referees:
Andrea Piardi (Italy)
Luc Ramos (France)
Television match official:
Oli Kellett (Australia)

6 July 2024
19:55 AEST (UTC+10)

Australia	25–16	Wales
Try: Tupou 20' c Daugunu 52' m T. Wright 69' c Con: Lolesio (1/2) 22'; Lynagh (1/1) 70'; Pen: Lolesio (2/3) 7', 15'	Report	Try: Penalty try 25'; Pen: B. Thomas (3/3) 3', 46', 66'

Sydney Football Stadium, Sydney
Attendance: 35,945
Referee: Pierre Brousset (France)

Team details

FB	15	Tom Wright
RW	14	Andrew Kellaway
OC	13	Josh Flook
IC	12	Hunter Paisami
LW	11	Filipo Daugunu		(substituted off) 77'
FH	10	Noah Lolesio		(substituted off) 64'
SH	9	Jake Gordon		(substituted off) 64'
N8	8	Rob Valetini
OF	7	Fraser McReight	(yellow card) 25'
BF	6	Liam Wright (c)		(substituted off) 57'
RL	5	Jeremy Williams		(substituted off) 41'
LL	4	Lukhan Salakaia-Loto
TP	3	Taniela Tupou		(substituted off) 41'
HK	2	Matt Faessler		(substituted off) 66'
LP	1	James Slipper		(substituted off) 51'
Replacements:
HK	16	Billy Pollard		(substituted on) 66'
PR	17	Isaac Kailea		(substituted on) 51'
PR	18	Allan Alaalatoa		(substituted on) 41'
LK	19	Angus Blyth		(substituted on) 41'
FL	20	Charlie Cale		(substituted on) 57'
SH	21	Tate McDermott		(substituted on) 64'
FH	22	Tom Lynagh		(substituted on) 64'
WG	23	Dylan Pietsch		(substituted on) 77'
Coach:
(New Zealand) Joe Schmidt

FB	15	Liam Williams		(substituted off) 64'
RW	14	Josh Hathaway
OC	13	Owen Watkin
IC	12	Mason Grady
LW	11	Rio Dyer
FH	10	Ben Thomas		(substituted off) 73'
SH	9	Ellis Bevan		(substituted off) 73'
N8	8	Aaron Wainwright
OF	7	Tommy Reffell
BF	6	Taine Plumtree		(substituted off) 57'
RL	5	Dafydd Jenkins		(substituted off) 66'
LL	4	Christ Tshiunza
TP	3	Archie Griffin		(substituted off) 75'
HK	2	Dewi Lake (c)		(substituted off) 73'
LP	1	Gareth Thomas	(yellow card) 20'	(substituted off) 41'
Replacements:
HK	16	Evan Lloyd		(substituted on) 73'
PR	17	Kemsley Mathias		(substituted on) 41'
PR	18	Harri O'Connor		(substituted on) 75'
LK	19	Cory Hill		(substituted on) 66'
FL	20	James Botham		(substituted on) 57'
SH	21	Kieran Hardy		(substituted on) 73'
FH	22	Sam Costelow		(substituted on) 73'
CE	23	Nick Tompkins		(substituted on) 64'
Coach:
(New Zealand) Warren Gatland

Player of the Match:
Jake Gordon (Australia)
Assistant referees:
Ben O'Keeffe (New Zealand)
James Doleman (New Zealand)
Television match official:
Marius Jonker (South Africa)
Foul play review officer:
Glenn Newman (New Zealand)

Notes:

- Angus Blyth, Charlie Cale, Josh Flook, Isaac Kailea, Tom Lynagh, Dylan Pietsch, Jeremy Williams (all Australia) and Josh Hathaway (Wales) made their international debuts.
- Aaron Wainwright (Wales) earned his 50th test cap.
- With this result, Wales fall to 11th on the World Rugby Rankings, their lowest ever position in the rankings.

6 July 2024
17:00 SAST (UTC+02)

South Africa	27–20	Ireland
Try: Arendse 2' c Kolbe 64' c Penalty try 77'; Con: Pollard (2/2) 3', 66'; Pen: Pollard (2/5) 17', 28'	Report	Try: Osborne 34' m Murray 74' c Baird 78' c Con: Crowley (1/3) 75'; Pen: Crowley (1/2) 12'

Loftus Versfeld Stadium, Pretoria
Attendance: 50,066
Referee: Luke Pearce (England)

Team details

FB	15	Willie le Roux
RW	14	Cheslin Kolbe
OC	13	Jesse Kriel
IC	12	Damian de Allende
LW	11	Kurt-Lee Arendse	(yellow card) 74'
FH	10	Handré Pollard		(substituted off) 73'
SH	9	Faf de Klerk		(substituted off) 59'
N8	8	Kwagga Smith
BF	7	Pieter-Steph du Toit
OF	6	Siya Kolisi (c)		(substituted off) 49'
RL	5	Franco Mostert		(substituted off) 49'
LL	4	Eben Etzebeth		(substituted off) 49'
TP	3	Frans Malherbe		(substituted off) 49'
HK	2	Bongi Mbonambi		(substituted off) 49'
LP	1	Ox Nché		(substituted off) 49'
Replacements:
HK	16	Malcolm Marx		(substituted on) 49'
PR	17	Gerhard Steenekamp		(substituted on) 49'
PR	18	Vincent Koch		(substituted on) 49'
LK	19	Salmaan Moerat		(substituted on) 49'
LK	20	RG Snyman		(substituted on) 49'
FL	21	Marco van Staden		(substituted on) 49'
SH	22	Grant Williams		(substituted on) 59'
FH	23	Sacha Feinberg-Mngomezulu		(substituted on) 73'
Coach:
(South Africa) Rassie Erasmus

FB	15	Jamie Osborne		(substituted off) 50'
RW	14	Calvin Nash
OC	13	Robbie Henshaw		(substituted off) 41'
IC	12	Bundee Aki
LW	11	James Lowe
FH	10	Jack Crowley
SH	9	Craig Casey		(substituted off) 63'
N8	8	Caelan Doris
OF	7	Josh van der Flier
BF	6	Peter O'Mahony (c)		(substituted off) 49'
RL	5	Tadhg Beirne
LL	4	Joe McCarthy		(substituted off) 49'
TP	3	Tadhg Furlong		(substituted off) 62'
HK	2	Dan Sheehan		(substituted off) 41'
LP	1	Andrew Porter		(substituted off) 73'
Replacements:
HK	16	Rónan Kelleher	(yellow card) 77'	(substituted on) 41'
PR	17	Cian Healy		(substituted on) 73'
PR	18	Finlay Bealham		(substituted on) 62'
LK	19	James Ryan		(substituted on) 49'
LK	20	Ryan Baird		(substituted on) 49'
SH	21	Conor Murray		(substituted on) 63'
FH	22	Ciarán Frawley		(substituted on) 50'
CE	23	Garry Ringrose		(substituted on) 41'
Coach:
(England) Andy Farrell

Player of the Match:
Pieter-Steph du Toit (South Africa)
Assistant referees:
Karl Dickson (England)
Mike Adamson (Scotland)
Television match official:
Ben Whitehouse (Wales)
Foul play review officer:
Ian Tempest (England)

Notes:

- Jamie Osborne (Ireland) made his international debut.
- This was South Africa's first victory over Ireland since 2016.

6 July 2024
16:10 ART (UTC-03)

Argentina	13–28	France
Try: Montoya 61' m Orlando 78' m Pen: S.Carreras (1/1) 26'	Report	Try: Serin 36' c Frisch 45' c Attissogbé 67' m Con: Hastoy (2/3) 37', 46'; Pen: Hastoy (2/2) 23', 56'; Jaminet (1/1) 76'

Estadio Malvinas Argentinas, Mendoza
Attendance: 36,000
Referee: Chris Busby (Ireland)

Team details

FB	15	Martín Bogado	(substituted off) 45'
RW	14	Bautista Delguy
OC	13	Matías Moroni
IC	12	Jerónimo de la Fuente	(substituted off) 69'
LW	11	Mateo Carreras
FH	10	Santiago Carreras
SH	9	Gonzalo Bertranou	(substituted off) 45'
N8	8	Joaquín Oviedo
OF	7	Marcos Kremer
BF	6	Pablo Matera
RL	5	Lucas Paulos	(substituted off) 69'
LL	4	Matías Alemanno	(substituted off) 56'
TP	3	Eduardo Bello	(substituted off) 52'
HK	2	Julián Montoya (c)	(substituted off) 59'
LP	1	Thomas Gallo	(substituted off) 52'
Replacements:
HK	16	Ignacio Ruiz	(substituted on) 59'
PR	17	Mayco Vivas	(substituted on) 52'
PR	18	Lucio Sordoni	(substituted on) 52'
LK	19	Franco Molina	(substituted on) 56'
FL	20	Juan Bautista Pedemonte	(substituted on) 69'
SH	21	Lautaro Bazán	(substituted on) 45'
FH	22	Tomás Albornoz	(substituted on) 45'
CE	23	Matías Orlando	(substituted on) 69'
Coach:
(Argentina) Felipe Contepomi

FB	15	Léo Barré	(substituted off) 72'
RW	14	Théo Attissogbé
OC	13	Émilien Gailleton
IC	12	Antoine Frisch
LW	11	Lester Etien
FH	10	Antoine Hastoy
SH	9	Baptiste Serin (c)	(substituted off) 70'
N8	8	Jordan Joseph	(substituted off) 69'
OF	7	Oscar Jegou
BF	6	Lenni Nouchi
RL	5	Baptiste Pesenti	(substituted off) 52'
LL	4	Hugo Auradou	(substituted off) 52'
TP	3	Georges-Henri Colombe	(substituted off) 52'
HK	2	Gaëtan Barlot	(substituted off) 67'
LP	1	Jean-Baptiste Gros	(substituted off) 59'
Replacements:
HK	16	Teddy Baubigny	(substituted on) 67'
PR	17	Sébastien Taofifénua	(substituted on) 59'
PR	18	Demba Bamba	(substituted on) 52'
LK	19	Posolo Tuilagi	(substituted on) 52'
FL	20	Mickaël Guillard	(substituted on) 52'
FL	21	Ibrahim Diallo	(substituted on) 69'
SH	22	Baptiste Couilloud	(substituted on) 70'
FB	23	Melvyn Jaminet	(substituted on) 72'
Coach:
(France) Fabien Galthié

Assistant referees:
Andrew Brace (Ireland)
Eoghan Cross (Ireland)
Television match official:
Marius van der Westhuizen (South Africa)
Foul play review officer:
Quinton Immelman (South Africa)

Notes:

- Franco Molina, Juan Bautista Pedemonte (both Argentina), Théo Attissogbé, Hugo Auradou, Lester Etien, Antoine Frisch, Mickaël Guillard, Oscar Jegou, Jordan Joseph and Lenni Nouchi (all France) made their international debuts.

6 July 2024
15:00 CLT (UTC-04)

Chile	22–17	Hong Kong
Try: Garafulic (2) 11' m, 46' c C. Saavedra 40' c Con: S. Videla (2/3) 37', 40'; Pen: S. Videla (1/1) 2'	Report	Try: Sawyer 56' c Hrstich 74' c Con: De Thierry (2/2) 57', 76'; Pen: De Thierry (1/1) 17'

Estadio Fiscal de Talca, Talca
Attendance: 7,000
Referee: Gonzalo de Achaval (Argentina)

Team details

FB	15	Lucas Strabucchi
RW	14	Cristóbal Game
OC	13	Domingo Saavedra
IC	12	Santiago Videla
LW	11	Nicolás Garafulic	(substituted off) 67'
FH	10	Tomás Salas
SH	9	Marcelo Torrealba	(substituted off) 49'
N8	8	Raimundo Martínez	(substituted off) 66'
OF	7	Clemente Saavedra (c)
BF	6	Alfonso Escobar	(substituted off) 80'
RL	5	Javier Eissmann	(substituted off) 54'
LL	4	Santiago Pedrero
TP	3	Iñaki Gurruchaga	(substituted off) 63'
HK	2	Diego Escobar	(substituted off) 54'
LP	1	Javier Carrasco	(substituted off) 59'
Replacements:
HK	16	Augusto Böhme	(substituted on) 54'
PR	17	Salvador Lues	(substituted on) 59'
PR	18	Vittorio Lastra	(substituted on) 63'
FL	19	Martín Sigren	(substituted on) 54'
FL	20	Inti Úbeda	(substituted on) 66'
FL	21	Andrés Kuzmanic	(substituted on) 80'
SH	22	Benjamín Videla	(substituted on) 49'
CE	23	Clemente Armstrong	(substituted on) 67'
Coach:
(Uruguay) Pablo Lemoine

FB	15	Matt Worley
RW	14	Seb Brien
OC	13	Nathan De Thierry
IC	12	Tom Hill
LW	11	Harry Sayers
FH	10	Matteo Avitabile		(substituted off) 54'
SH	9	Joe Laidler	(yellow card) 40'	(substituted off) 59'
N8	8	Luke van der Smit		(substituted off) 59'
OF	7	James Sawyer		(substituted off) 64'
BF	6	Joshua Hrstich (c)
RL	5	Patrick Jenkinson		(substituted off) 54'
LL	4	Callum McCullough
TP	3	Zac Cinnamond		(substituted off) 53'
HK	2	Callum Scott		(substituted off) 54'
LP	1	Rory Cinnamond		(substituted off) 60'
Replacements:
HK	16	Alexander Post		(substituted on) 54'
PR	17	Ben Higgins		(substituted on) 60'
PR	18	Faizal Solomona		(substituted on) 53'
LK	19	Kyle Sullivan		(substituted on) 54'
FL	20	Tyler McNutt		(substituted on) 59'
FL	21	Pierce MacKinlay-West		(substituted on) 64'
SH	22	Jack Combes		(substituted on) 59'
FB	23	Paul Altier		(substituted on) 54'
Coach:
(New Zealand) Andrew Douglas

Assistant referees:
Francisco González (Uruguay)
Sergio Alvarenga (Paraguay)

Notes:

- Clemente Armstrong, Andrés Kuzmanic and Lucas Strabucchi (all Chile) made their international debuts.
- This was Chile's first win over Hong Kong, and the first time they have hosted them.

6 July 2024
17:00 EDT (UTC-04)

Canada	12–73	Scotland
Try: Rumball 9' m Baillie 49' c Con: Nelson (1/1) 50'	Report	Try: Bayliss 13' c Richardson (2) 16' c, 19' m Reed (2) 30' m, 54' c Warr (2) 45' c, 51' c Paterson 61' c Dobie 69' c McDowall 74' c Steyn 80' c Con: Thompson (5/7) 14', 17', 46', 52', 55'; Healy (4/4) 61', 69', 75', 80'

TD Place Stadium, Ottawa
Attendance: 11,447
Referee: Adam Leal (England)

Team details

FB	15	Cooper Coats
RW	14	Andrew Coe	(substituted off) 58'
OC	13	Mitch Richardson	(substituted off) 70'
IC	12	Ben LeSage	(substituted off) 64'
LW	11	Nic Benn
FH	10	Peter Nelson
SH	9	Jason Higgins
N8	8	Siaki Vikilani	(substituted off) 58'
OF	7	Lucas Rumball (c)
BF	6	Mason Flesch
RL	5	Kyle Baillie	(substituted off) 71'
LL	4	Conor Keys
TP	3	Conor Young	(substituted off) 53'
HK	2	Andrew Quattrin	(substituted off) 64'
LP	1	Liam Murray	(substituted off) 49'
Replacements:
HK	16	Jesse Mackail	(substituted on) 64'
PR	17	Djustice Sears-Duru	(substituted on) 49'
PR	18	Cole Keith	(substituted on) 53'
N8	19	James Stockwood	(substituted on) 71'
FL	20	Siôn Parry	(substituted on) 58'
SH	21	Brock Gallagher	(substituted on) 70'
CE	22	Talon McMullin	(substituted on) 64'
CE	23	Takoda McMullin	(substituted on) 58'
Coach:
(Wales) Kingsley Jones

FB	15	Harry Paterson
RW	14	Jamie Dobie
OC	13	Matt Currie	(substituted off) 64'
IC	12	Stafford McDowall (cc)
LW	11	Arron Reed
FH	10	Ross Thompson	(substituted off) 55'
SH	9	Gus Warr	(substituted off) 64'
N8	8	Josh Bayliss	(substituted off) 7'
OF	7	Luke Crosbie (cc)	(substituted off) 55'
BF	6	Gregor Brown
RL	5	Glen Young
LL	4	Max Williamson	(substituted off) 55'
TP	3	Elliot Millar-Mills	(substituted off) 55'
HK	2	Dylan Richardson
LP	1	Rory Sutherland	(substituted off) 55'
Replacements:
HK	16	Robbie Smith	(substituted on) 57'
PR	17	Nathan McBeth	(substituted on) 51'
PR	18	Will Hurd	(substituted on) 51'
LK	19	Ewan Johnson	(substituted on) 55'
FL	20	Matt Fagerson	(substituted on) 73'
FH	21	Ben Healy	(substituted on) 55'
WG	22	Kyle Steyn	(substituted on) 64'
WG	23	Ross McCann	(substituted on) 64'
Coach:
(Scotland) Gregor Townsend

Harry Paterson (Scotland)
Assistant referees:
Kat Roche (United States)
Kahlil Harrison (United States)
Television match official:
Austin Reed (United States)

Notes:

- This was Scotland's biggest ever win against Canada.
- Nic Benn, Jesse Mackail, Takoda McMullin, Talon McMullin, James Stockwood (all Canada), Gregor Brown, Matt Currie, Will Hurd, Ewan Johnson, Nathan McBeth, Ross McCann, Arron Reed, Robbie Smith, Gus Warr and Max Williamson (all Scotland) made their international debuts.
- Scotland retained the Douglas Horn Trophy.

=== 10 July ===
10 July 2024
14:00 UYT (UTC-03)

Uruguay	28–43	France
Try: Kessler 27' c Arcos Pérez 43' c Pujadas 65' c Penalty try 78'; Con: Etcheverry (3/3) 28', 44', 65'	Report	Try: Couilloud (2) 8' c, 19' c Tuilagi (2) 60' c, 63' c Con: Berdeu (2/2) 9', 20'; Segonds (2/2) 61', 64'; Pen: Berdeu (5) 6', 32', 40', 46', 52'

Estadio Charrúa, Montevideo
Referee: Angus Mabey (New Zealand)

Team details

FB	15	Baltazar Amaya
RW	14	Mateo Viñals	(substituted off) 78'
OC	13	Felipe Arcos Pérez
IC	12	Andrés Vilaseca (c)
LW	11	Bautista Basso
FH	10	Felipe Etcheverry
SH	9	Santiago Arata	(substituted off) 26'
N8	8	Manuel Diana	(substituted off) 49'
OF	7	Santiago Civetta	(substituted off) 58'
BF	6	Manuel Ardao
RL	5	Manuel Leindekar
LL	4	Felipe Aliaga	(substituted off) 75'
TP	3	Reinaldo Piussi	(substituted off) 61'
HK	2	Germán Kessler	(substituted off) 58'
LP	1	Mateo Sanguinetti	(substituted off) 49'
Replacements:
HK	16	Guillermo Pujadas	(substituted on) 58'
PR	17	Ignacio Péculo	(substituted on) 49'
PR	18	Diego Arbelo	(substituted on) 61'
LK	19	Ignacio Dotti	(substituted on) 75'
FL	20	Lucas Bianchi	(substituted on) 49'
N8	21	Carlos Deus	(substituted on) 58'
CE	22	Tomás Inciarte	(substituted on) 26'
WG	23	Ignacio Álvarez	(substituted on) 78'
Coach:
(Argentina) Rodolfo Ambrosio

FB	15	Lucas Dubois	(substituted off) 64'
RW	14	Jules Favre
OC	13	Arthur Vincent
IC	12	Léon Darricarrère
LW	11	Joris Jurand
FH	10	Léo Berdeu	(substituted off) 55'
SH	9	Baptiste Couilloud (c)	(substituted off) 50'
N8	8	Killian Tixeront	(substituted off) 50'
OF	7	Romain Briatte
BF	6	Ibrahim Diallo
RL	5	Florent Vanverberghe
LL	4	Pierre-Henri Azagoh	(substituted off) 59'
TP	3	Thomas Laclayat	(substituted off) 17'
HK	2	Teddy Baubigny	(substituted off) 50'
LP	1	Giorgi Beria	(substituted off) 59'
Replacements:
HK	16	Jannick Tarrit	(substituted on) 50'
PR	17	Sébastien Taofifénua	(substituted on) 59'
PR	18	Demba Bamba	(substituted on) 59'
LK	19	Posolo Tuilagi	(substituted on) 59'
FL	20	Yann Peysson	(substituted on) 50'
SH	21	Baptiste Jauneau	(substituted on) 50'
FH	22	Joris Segonds	(substituted on) 55'
WG	23	Nathanaël Hulleu	(substituted on) 64'
Coach:
(France) Fabien Galthié

Assistant referees:
Gonzalo de Achaval (Argentina)
Tomás Bertazza (Argentina)

Notes:

- Santiago Arata (Uruguay) earned his 50th test cap.
- This was the first time Uruguay has hosted France in a test match.

=== 12/13 July ===
12 July 2024
15:30 TOT (UTC+13)

Tonga	14–36	Italy
Try: Taulani 45' c F. Paea 77' c Con: Faiva (2/2) 46', 78'	Report	Try: Trulla 19' m Ioane 34' c Lamaro 49' c A. Garbisi 64' c Penalty try 85'; Con: P. Garbisi (3/4) 35', 51', 65'; Pen: P. Garbisi (1/2) 30'

Teufaiva Sport Stadium, Nukuʻalofa
Attendance: 3,000
Referee: Damian Schneider (Argentina)

Team details

FB	15	Taniela Filimone
RW	14	Fine Inisi
OC	13	Fetuli Paea
IC	12	Malakai Fekitoa		(substituted off) 65'
LW	11	Hosea Saumaki
FH	10	James Faiva		(substituted off) 78'
SH	9	Aisea Halo		(substituted off) 71'
N8	8	Viliami Taulani		(substituted off) 51'
OF	7	Fotu Lokotui
BF	6	Josh Kaifa
RL	5	Harison Mataele		(substituted off) 71'
LL	4	Adam Coleman
TP	3	Ben Tameifuna (c)		(substituted off) 62'	(substituted on) 85'
HK	2	Sekope Lopeti-Moli		(substituted off) 62'
LP	1	Isikeli Fukofuka		(substituted off) 38'
Replacements:
HK	16	Sosefo Sakalia		(substituted on) 62'
PR	17	Tau Koloamatangi	(yellow card) 85'	(substituted on) 38'
PR	18	Jethro Felemi		(substituted on) 62'
LK	19	Kelemete Finau-Fetuli		(substituted on) 71'
FL	20	Hapakuki Moala-Liava'a		(substituted on) 51'
SH	21	Manu Paea		(substituted on) 71'
FH	22	Semisi Ma'asi		(substituted on) 78'	(substituted off) 85'
CE	23	Nikolai Foliaki		(substituted on) 65'
Coach:
(Tonga) Tevita Tu'ifa

FB	15	Ange Capuozzo
RW	14	Jacopo Trulla
OC	13	Ignacio Brex
IC	12	Tommaso Menoncello
LW	11	Monty Ioane
FH	10	Paolo Garbisi	(substituted off) 66'
SH	9	Martin Page-Relo	(substituted off) 57'
N8	8	Lorenzo Cannone
OF	7	Michele Lamaro (c)	(substituted off) 66'
BF	6	Manuel Zuliani	(substituted off) 43'
RL	5	Federico Ruzza	(substituted off) 40'
LL	4	Edoardo Iachizzi	(substituted off) 47'	(substituted on) 58'
TP	3	Marco Riccioni	(substituted off) 57'
HK	2	Giovanni Nicotera	(substituted off) 68'
LP	1	Danilo Fischetti	(substituted off) 53'
Replacements:
HK	16	Gianmarco Lucchesi	(substituted on) 68'
PR	17	Mirco Spagnolo	(substituted on) 53'
PR	18	Simone Ferrari	(substituted on) 57'
LK	19	Niccolò Cannone	(substituted on) 47'	(substituted off) 58'	(substituted on) 66'
LK	20	Andrea Zambonin	(substituted on) 40'
SH	21	Alessandro Garbisi	(substituted on) 57'
FH	22	Leonardo Marin	(substituted on) 66'
FL	23	Ross Vintcent	(substituted on) 43'
Coach:
(Argentina) Gonzalo Quesada

Assistant referees:
James Doleman (New Zealand)
Marcus Playle (New Zealand)

Notes:

- Taniela Filimone, Isikeli Fukofuka, Josh Kaifa, Sekope Lopeti-Moli, Semisi Ma'asi and Hapakuki Moala-Liava'a (all Tonga) made their international debuts.
- With this victory for Italy, and other results, Italy climb to eighth on the World Rugby Rankings, their joint highest position since they last held the position in 2007.

12 July 2024
18:30 EDT (UTC-04)

United States	7–42	Scotland
Try: Boni 32' c Con: MacGinty 33'	Report	Try: Van der Merwe 6' c Ashman (3) 19' c, 27' c, 40+3' c Horne 50' c Fagerson 73' c Con: Hastings (5/5) 7', 21', 28', 40+4', 51'; Thompson 74'

Audi Field, Washington, D.C.
Attendance: 17,418
Referee: Jordan Way (Australia)

Team details

FB	15	Luke Carty
RW	14	Conner Mooneyham
OC	13	Tavite Lopeti		(substituted off) 55'
IC	12	Tommaso Boni
LW	11	Nate Augspurger		(substituted off) 55'
FH	10	AJ MacGinty
SH	9	JP Smith		(substituted off) 73'
N8	8	Jamason Fa'anana-Schultz
OF	7	Paddy Ryan (c)
BF	6	Sam Golla		(substituted off) 55'
RL	5	Greg Peterson
LL	4	Viliame Helu		(substituted off) 63'
TP	3	David Ainu'u	(yellow card) 26'	(substituted off) 55'
HK	2	Dylan Fawsitt		(substituted off) 55'
LP	1	Jack Iscaro		(substituted off) 55'
Replacements:
HK	16	Kapeli Pifeleti		(substituted on) 55'
PR	17	Jake Turnbull		(substituted on) 55'
PR	18	Paul Mullen		(substituted on) 55'
N8	19	Saia Uhila		(substituted on) 63'
FL	20	Ben Bonasso		(substituted on) 55'
SH	21	Ethan McVeigh		(substituted on) 73'
CE	22	Bryce Campbell		(substituted on) 55'
FB	23	Mitch Wilson		(substituted on) 55'
Coach:
(United States) Scott Lawrence

FB	15	Kyle Rowe
RW	14	Kyle Steyn
OC	13	Huw Jones	(substituted off) 67'
IC	12	Sione Tuipulotu (cc)
LW	11	Duhan van der Merwe
FH	10	Adam Hastings	(substituted off) 58'
SH	9	George Horne	(substituted off) 58'
N8	8	Matt Fagerson
OF	7	Rory Darge (cc)
BF	6	Jamie Ritchie	(substituted off) 63'
RL	5	Scott Cummings
LL	4	Alex Craig	(substituted off) 52'
TP	3	Murphy Walker	(substituted off) 52'
HK	2	Ewan Ashman	(substituted off) 58'
LP	1	Pierre Schoeman	(substituted off) 52'
Replacements:
HK	16	Robbie Smith	(substituted on) 58'
PR	17	Rory Sutherland	(substituted on) 52'
PR	18	Elliot Millar-Mills	(substituted on) 52'
LK	19	Max Williamson	(substituted on) 52'
FL	20	Luke Crosbie	(substituted on) 63'
SH	21	Jamie Dobie	(substituted on) 58'
FH	22	Ross Thompson	(substituted on) 58'
CE	23	Matt Currie	(substituted on) 67'
Coach:
(Scotland) Gregor Townsend

Player of the Match:
Ewan Ashman (Scotland)
Assistant referees:
Adam Leal (England)
Robin Kaluzniak (Canada)
Television match official:
Chris Assmus (Canada)

Notes:

- Conner Mooneyham, Saia Uhila and Ethan McVeigh (all USA) all made their international debuts.
- Jamie Ritchie (Scotland) earned his 50th test cap.
- Duhan van der Merwe scored his 27th international test try to become Scotland's joint all-time top try scorer (tied with Stuart Hogg).

12 July 2024
19:00 EDT (UTC-04)

Canada	35–22	Romania
Try: Benn 24' c Fryer 44' c Quattrin (2) 65' c, 69' m Con: Nelson (3/4) 25', 45', 66'; Pen: Nelson (3/4) 4', 10', 79'	Report	Try: Neculau 31' c Conache 48' c Manumua 61' m Con: Conache (2/3) 32', 49'; Pen: Conache (1/2) 13'

TD Place Stadium, Ottawa
Attendance: 4,000
Referee: Hollie Davidson (Scotland)

Team details

FB	15	Cooper Coats	(substituted off) 66'
RW	14	Andrew Coe
OC	13	Ben LeSage
IC	12	Talon McMullin	(substituted off) 79'
LW	11	Nic Benn
FH	10	Peter Nelson
SH	9	Jason Higgins	(substituted off) 79'
N8	8	Lucas Rumball (c)
OF	7	Ethan Fryer	(substituted off) 70'
BF	6	Mason Flesch
RL	5	Kyle Baillie	(substituted off) 79'
LL	4	Conor Keys
TP	3	Conor Young	(substituted off) 70'
HK	2	Andrew Quattrin	(substituted off) 77'
LP	1	Liam Murray	(substituted off) 49'
Replacements:
HK	16	Dewald Kotze	(substituted on) 77'
PR	17	Calixto Martinez	(substituted on) 49'
PR	18	Cole Keith	(substituted on) 70'
N8	19	James Stockwood	(substituted on) 79'
FL	20	Sion Parry	(substituted on) 70'
SH	21	Brock Gallagher	(substituted on) 79'
FH	22	Mark Balaski	(substituted on) 79'
CE	23	Takoda McMullin	(substituted on) 66'
Coach:
(Wales) Kingsley Jones

FB	15	Paul Popoaia		(substituted off) 77'
RW	14	Marius Simionescu (c)		(substituted off) 79'
OC	13	Mihai Graure
IC	12	Jason Tomane	(yellow card) 24'
LW	11	Tevita Manumua	(yellow card) 67'
FH	10	Hinckley Vaovasa
SH	9	Alin Conache		(substituted off) 66'
N8	8	Nicolaas Immelman
OF	7	Dragoș Ser		(substituted off) 60'
BF	6	Vlad Neculau
RL	5	Andrei Mahu		(substituted off) 45'
LL	4	Yanis Horvat
TP	3	Vasile Balan		(substituted off) 79'
HK	2	Ștefan Buruiană		(substituted off) 54'
LP	1	Iulian Harțig		(substituted off) 45'
Replacements:
HK	16	Robert Irimescu		(substituted on) 54'
PR	17	Alexandru Savin		(substituted on) 45'
PR	18	Cosmin Manole		(substituted on) 79'
LK	19	Marius Iftimiciuc		(substituted on) 45'
CE	20	Fonovai Tangimana		(substituted on) 60'
SH	21	Gabriel Rupanu		(substituted on) 66'
WG	22	Corrado Stetco		(substituted on) 77'
FH	23	Daniel Plai		(substituted on) 79'
Coach:
(France) David Gérard

Player of the Match:
Ethan Fryer (Canada)
Assistant referees:
Kat Roche (United States)
Luke Rogan (United States)

Notes:

- Mark Balaski, Ethan Fryer, Dewald Kotze, Calixto Martinez (all Canada) and Corrado Stetco (Romania) made their international debuts.
- This was Canada's first win over Romania since their 34–3 victory during the 1995 Rugby World Cup.

13 July 2024
16:00 AST (UTC+13)

Samoa	34–30	Spain
Try: Niue 3' c Paia'aua 17' c Matavao 28' c Ah Wong 79' c Con: Leuila (4/4) 5', 18', 29', 80'; Pen: Leuila (2/3) 71', 74'	Report	Try: Vinuesa 20' c Alonso 52' c Pirlet 80+3' c Con: Vinuesa (3/3) 21', 53', 80+4'; Pen: Vinuesa (3/4) 8', 40+1', 69'

Apia Park, Apia
Referee: Ben O'Keeffe (New Zealand)

Team details

FB	15	Duncan Paia'aua
RW	14	Owen Niue	(substituted off) 58'
OC	13	Stacey Ili	(substituted off) 79'
IC	12	Danny Toala
LW	11	Nigel Ah Wong
FH	10	D'Angelo Leuila
SH	9	Melani Matavao	(substituted off) 47'
N8	8	Olajuwon Noa	(substituted off) 54'
OF	7	Murphy Taramai
BF	6	Theo McFarland (c)
RL	5	Sam Slade
LL	4	Ben Nee-Nee	(substituted off) 62'
TP	3	Marco Fepulea'i	(substituted off) 56'
HK	2	Sama Malolo	(substituted off) 69'
LP	1	Aki Seiuli	(substituted off) 69'
Replacements:
HK	16	Andrew Tuala	(substituted on) 69'
PR	17	Tietie Tuimauga	(substituted on) 56'
PR	18	Lolani Faleiva	(substituted on) 69'
LK	19	Michael Curry	(substituted on) 62'
FL	20	Iakopo Mapu	(substituted on) 54'
SH	21	Ere Enari	(substituted on) 47'
FH	22	Afa Moleli	(substituted on) 79'
WG	23	Pisi Leilua	(substituted on) 58'
Coach:
(Samoa) Mahonri Schwalger

FB	15	J. W. Bell
RW	14	Gauthier Minguillón
OC	13	Alex Alonso
IC	12	Iñaki Mateu
LW	11	Pau Aira	(substituted off) 70'
FH	10	Gonzalo Vinuesa	(substituted off) 73'
SH	9	Tany Bay	(substituted off) 73'
N8	8	Ekain Imaz
OF	7	Raphael Nieto	(substituted off) 58'
BF	6	Mario Pichardie (c)
RL	5	Asier Usárraga	(substituted off) 68'
LL	4	Ignacio Piñeiro
TP	3	Lucas Santamaría	(substituted off) 48'
HK	2	Santiago Ovejero	(substituted off) 62'
LP	1	Bernardo Vázquez	(substituted off) 48'
Replacements:
HK	16	Álvaro García	(substituted on) 62'
PR	17	Thierry Futeu	(substituted on) 48'
PR	18	Hugo Pirlet	(substituted on) 48'
LK	19	Alejandro Suárez	(substituted on) 68'
FL	20	Vicente Boronat	(substituted on) 58'
SH	21	Pablo Pérez	(substituted on) 73'
FH	22	Bautista Güemes	(substituted on) 70'
WG	23	Facundo López	(substituted on) 73'
Coach:
(Argentina) Pablo Bouza

Assistant referees:
Jordan Kaminski (Australia)
Tevita Rokovereni (Fiji)

Notes:

- Pisi Leilua, Owen Niue, (all Samoa), Vicente Boronat, Facundo López, Pablo Pérez, Hugo Pirlet and Bernardo Vázquez (all Spain) made their international debuts.
- This was the first time Samoa has hosted Spain in a test match, and the first time Spain has traveled to the Pacific nations for a tour .

13 July 2024
19:05 NZST (UTC+12)

New Zealand	24–17	England
Try: Tele'a (2) 11' c, 61' m Con: McKenzie (1/2) 13'; Pen: McKenzie (4/4) 20', 38', 69', 75'	Report	Try: Feyi-Waboso 14' c Freeman 40+1' c Con: Smith (2/2) 15', 40+2'; Pen: Smith (1/1) 49'

Eden Park, Auckland
Attendance: 48,362
Referee: Nic Berry (Australia)

Team details

FB	15	Stephen Perofeta	(substituted off) 49'
RW	14	Sevu Reece
OC	13	Rieko Ioane	(substituted off) 59'
IC	12	Jordie Barrett
LW	11	Mark Tele'a
FH	10	Damian McKenzie
SH	9	Finlay Christie	(substituted off) 53'
N8	8	Ardie Savea
OF	7	Dalton Papali'i
BF	6	Samipeni Finau	(substituted off) 49'
RL	5	Patrick Tuipulotu	(substituted off) 54'
LL	4	Scott Barrett (c)
TP	3	Tyrel Lomax	(substituted off) 54'
HK	2	Codie Taylor	(substituted off) 64'
LP	1	Ethan de Groot	(substituted off) 49'
Replacements:
HK	16	Asafo Aumua	(substituted on) 64'
PR	17	Ofa Tu'ungafasi	(substituted on) 49'
PR	18	Fletcher Newell	(substituted on) 54'
LK	19	Tupou Vaa'i	(substituted on) 54'
FL	20	Luke Jacobson	(substituted on) 49'
SH	21	Cortez Ratima	(substituted on) 53'
CE	22	Anton Lienert-Brown	(substituted on) 59'
FB	23	Beauden Barrett	(substituted on) 49'
Coach:
(New Zealand) Scott Robertson

FB	15	Freddie Steward		(substituted off) 69'
RW	14	Immanuel Feyi-Waboso	(substituted off) 68'
OC	13	Henry Slade
IC	12	Ollie Lawrence
LW	11	Tommy Freeman
FH	10	Marcus Smith	(substituted off) 62'	(substituted on) 69'
SH	9	Alex Mitchell
N8	8	Ben Earl
OF	7	Sam Underhill	(substituted off) 49'
BF	6	Chandler Cunningham-South	(substituted off) 62'
RL	5	George Martin
LL	4	Maro Itoje
TP	3	Will Stuart	(substituted off) 49'
HK	2	Jamie George (c)	(substituted off) 49'	(substituted on) 51'
LP	1	Fin Baxter	(substituted off) 68'
Replacements:
HK	16	Theo Dan	(substituted on) 49'	(substituted off) 51'
PR	17	Bevan Rodd	(substituted on) 68'
PR	18	Dan Cole	(substituted on) 49'
LK	19	Alex Coles	(substituted on) 62'
FL	20	Tom Curry	(substituted on) 49'
SH	21	Ben Spencer
FH	22	Fin Smith	(substituted on) 62'
WG	23	Ollie Sleightholme	(substituted on) 68'
Coach:
(England) Steve Borthwick

Player of the Match:
Mark Tele'a (New Zealand)
Assistant referees:
Damon Murphy (Australia)
Pierre Brousset (France)
Television match official:
Brett Cronan (Australia)
Foul play review officer:
Eric Gauzins France)

Notes:

- George Furbank was initially named at full-back in the England team, but was forced to withdraw late on 12 July with a back injury. He was replaced by Freddie Steward.
- Cortez Ratima (New Zealand) made his international debut.
- New Zealand retained the Hillary Shield.

13 July 2024
19:45 AEST (UTC+10)

Australia	36–28	Wales
Try: Daugunu (2) 6' c, 66' m Gordon 24' c Alaalatoa 53' m Con: Lolesio (2/4) 7', 25'; Pen: Lolesio (3/3) 14', 30', 38'; Donaldson (1/1) 77'	Report	Try: Lake (2) 27' c, 35' c Williams 46' c Dyer 69' c Con: B. Thomas (3/3) 29', 36', 48'; Costelow (1/1) 70'

Melbourne Rectangular Stadium, Melbourne
Attendance: 21,932
Referee: Nika Amashukeli (Georgia)

Team details

FB	15	Tom Wright
RW	14	Andrew Kellaway
OC	13	Josh Flook
IC	12	Hunter Paisami
LW	11	Filipo Daugunu
FH	10	Noah Lolesio		(substituted off) 70'
SH	9	Jake Gordon		(substituted off) 61'
N8	8	Charlie Cale		(substituted off) 59'
OF	7	Fraser McReight
BF	6	Rob Valetini
RL	5	Lukhan Salakaia-Loto	(yellow card) 33'
LL	4	Jeremy Williams		(substituted off) 58'
TP	3	Taniela Tupou		(substituted off) 40'
HK	2	Matt Faessler		(substituted off) 60'
LP	1	James Slipper (c)		(substituted off) 55'
Replacements:
HK	16	Josh Nasser		(substituted on) 60'
PR	17	Isaac Kailea		(substituted on) 55'
PR	18	Allan Alaalatoa		(substituted on) 40'
LK	19	Angus Blyth		(substituted on) 58'
FL	20	Langi Gleeson		(substituted on) 59'
SH	21	Nic White		(substituted on) 61'
FH	22	Ben Donaldson		(substituted on) 70'
WG	23	Dylan Pietsch
Coach:
(New Zealand) Joe Schmidt

FB	15	Cameron Winnett
RW	14	Liam Williams	(substituted off) 68'
OC	13	Owen Watkin
IC	12	Mason Grady
LW	11	Rio Dyer
FH	10	Ben Thomas	(substituted off) 60'
SH	9	Ellis Bevan	(substituted off) 60'
N8	8	Taine Plumtree
OF	7	Tommy Reffell
BF	6	James Botham
RL	5	Dafydd Jenkins	(substituted off) 64'
LL	4	Christ Tshiunza
TP	3	Archie Griffin	(substituted off) 34'	(substituted on) 40'
HK	2	Dewi Lake (c)	(substituted off) 68'
LP	1	Gareth Thomas
Replacements:
HK	16	Evan Lloyd	(substituted on) 68'
PR	17	Kemsley Mathias
PR	18	Harri O'Connor	(substituted on) 34'	(substituted off) 40'
LK	19	Cory Hill	(substituted on) 64'
N8	20	Mackenzie Martin
SH	21	Kieran Hardy	(substituted on) 60'
FH	22	Sam Costelow	(substituted on) 60'
CE	23	Nick Tompkins	(substituted on) 68'
Coach:
(New Zealand) Warren Gatland

Player of the Match:
Rob Valetini (Australia)
Assistant referees:
Matthew Carley (England)
Paul Williams (New Zealand)
Television match official:
Glenn Newman (New Zealand)
Foul play review officer:
Marius Jonker South Africa)

Notes:

- Josh Nasser (Australia) made his international debut.
- Australia retained the James Bevan Trophy.

13 July 2024
19:05 JST (UTC+09)

Japan	23–25	Georgia
Try: Naikabula 3' c Osada 64' c Con: Seung-sin (2/2) 4', 65'; Pen: Seung-sin (3/3) 17', 25', 56'		Try: Karkadze 20' m Alania 28' c Javakhia 74' c Con: Matkava (2/3) 29', 75'; Pen: Matkava (2/2) 9', 12'

Yurtec Stadium Sendai, Sendai
Attendance: 15,903
Referee: Andrea Piardi (Italy)

Team details

FB	15	Yoshitaka Yazaki
RW	14	Jone Naikabula		(substituted off) 68'
OC	13	Dylan Riley
IC	12	Samisoni Tua
LW	11	Tomoki Osada
FH	10	Lee Seung-sin		(substituted off) 65'
SH	9	Naoto Saito		(substituted off) 68'
N8	8	Tevita Tatafu		(substituted off) 48'
OF	7	Kanji Shimokawa	(red card) 20'
BF	6	Faulua Makisi
RL	5	Warner Dearns		(substituted off) 65'
LL	4	Michael Leitch (c)
TP	3	Shuhei Takeuchi		(substituted off) 75'
HK	2	Mamoru Harada		(substituted off) 65'
LP	1	Takayoshi Mohara		(substituted off) 48'
Replacements:
HK	16	Atsushi Sakate		(substituted on) 65'
PR	17	Takato Okabe		(substituted on) 48'
PR	18	Keijiro Tamefusa		(substituted on) 75'
LK	19	Sanaila Waqa	(yellow card) 72'	(substituted on) 48'
FL	20	Tiennan Costley		(substituted on) 65'
SH	21	Taiki Koyama		(substituted on) 68'
FH	22	Takuya Yamasawa		(substituted on) 65'
WG	23	Koga Nezuka		(substituted on) 68'
Coach:
(Australia) Eddie Jones

FB	15	Davit Niniashvili
RW	14	Aka Tabutsadze
OC	13	Demur Tapladze
IC	12	Giorgi Kveseladze	(yellow card) 59'
LW	11	Alexander Todua
FH	10	Luka Matkava
SH	9	Mikheil Alania		(substituted off) 47'
N8	8	Beka Gorgadze (c)
OF	7	Beka Saghinadze		(substituted off) 65'
BF	6	Giorgi Tsutskiridze		(substituted off) 47'
RL	5	Giorgi Javakhia
LL	4	Lado Chachanidze		(substituted off) 56'
TP	3	Irakli Aptsiauri		(substituted off) 69'
HK	2	Vano Karkadze		(substituted off) 56'
LP	1	Giorgi Akhaladze		(substituted off) 50'
Replacements:
HK	16	Luka Nioradze		(substituted on) 56'
PR	17	Luka Goginava		(substituted on) 50'
PR	18	Giorgi Dzmanashvili		(substituted on) 69'
LK	19	Mikheil Babunashvili		(substituted on) 56'
FL	20	Luka Ivanishvili		(substituted on) 47'
N8	21	Tornike Jalagonia		(substituted on) 65'
SH	22	Vasil Lobzhanidze		(substituted on) 47'
FH	23	Tedo Abzhandadze
Coach:
(England) Richard Cockerill

Assistant referees:
Christophe Ridley (England)
George Myers (Australia)
Television match official:
James Leckie (Australia)
Foul play review officer:
Oli Kellett (Australia)

Notes:

- Taiki Koyama, Takato Okabe (both Japan), Giorgi Dzmanashvili and Luka Goginava (both Georgia) made their international debuts.
- This was Georgia's first Test in Japan, and their first win since their 35–24 victory in 2014.

13 July 2024
14:00 CAT (UTC+02)

Namibia	22–37	Portugal
Try: Katjijeko 18' c Con: Swanepoel (1/1) 20'; Pen: Swanepoel (5/5) 4', 8', 42', 53', 59'		Try: Marta 11' c Martins 40' c Dos Santos 50' c Pinto 65' c Con: Cabral (4/4) 12', 40', 51', 66'; Pen: Cabral (2/3) 27', 55'; Vareiro 77'

Hage Geingob Rugby Stadium, Windhoek
Attendance: 3,325
Referee: AJ Jacobs (South Africa)

Team details

FB	15	Jay-Cee Nel
RW	14	Quirione Majiedt
OC	13	Alcino Izaacs	(substituted off) 71'
IC	12	Danco Burger (c)	(substituted off) 77'
LW	11	Lloyd Jacobs
FH	10	Tiaan Swanepoel
SH	9	Jacques Theron	(substituted off) 77'
N8	8	Adriaan Booysen
OF	7	Max Katjijeko
BF	6	Peter Diergaardt
RL	5	Johan Retief
LL	4	Ruan Ludick	(substituted off) 64'
TP	3	Haitembu Shikufa	(substituted off) 49'
HK	2	Obert Nortjé	(substituted off) 64'
LP	1	Jason Benade	(substituted off) 64'		(substituted on) 74'
Replacements:
HK	16	Armand Combrinck	(substituted on) 64'
PR	17	Des Sethie	(substituted on) 64'	(substituted off) 74'
PR	18	Chemigan Beukes	(substituted on) 49'
LK	19	Mahepisa Tjeriko	(substituted on) 64'
FL	20	Kistings Minyoi
SH	21	AJ Kearns	(substituted on) 77'
FH	22	Denzo Bruwer	(substituted on) 77'
CE	23	Hillian Beukes	(substituted on) 71'
Coach:
(South Africa) Allister Coetzee

FB	15	Manuel Cardoso Pinto
RW	14	José Paiva dos Santos
OC	13	José Lima	(substituted off) 64'
IC	12	Tomás Appleton (c)
LW	11	Rodrigo Marta
FH	10	Domingos Cabral	(substituted off) 74'
SH	9	Hugo Camacho	(substituted off) 55'
N8	8	João Granate	(substituted off) 59'
OF	7	Nicolas Martins	(substituted off) 55'
BF	6	José Madeira
RL	5	Duarte Torgal
LL	4	António Rebelo de Andrade
TP	3	Diogo Hasse Ferreira	(substituted off) 61'
HK	2	Luka Begic	(substituted off) 53'
LP	1	Francisco Fernandes	(substituted off) 53'
Replacements:
PR	16	Cody Thomas	(substituted on) 53'
HK	17	Pedro Vicente	(substituted on) 53'
PR	18	António Prim	(substituted on) 61'
FL	19	Diego Pinheiro	(substituted on) 59'
FL	20	Vasco Baptista	(substituted on) 55'
SH	21	Pedro Lucas	(substituted on) 55'
FH	22	Manuel Vareiro	(substituted on) 74'
FB	23	Simão Bento	(substituted on) 64'
Coach:
(New Zealand) Simon Mannix

Assistant referees:
Griffin Colby (South Africa)
Precious Pazani (Zimbabwe)

Notes:

- Denzo Bruwer, Jay-Cee Nel, Armand Combrinck, Lloyd Jacobs, AJ Kearns, Quirione Majiedt (all Namibia), António Rebelo de Andrade and Manuel Vareiro (both Portugal) made their international debuts.
- Danco Burger captained Namibia for the first time after the late withdrawal of !Prince Gaoseb.
- This was Namibia's first home test match since 2018, when they hosted Kenya as part of the 2018 Africa Cup, and their first home test match against non-African opposition since Uruguay in 2017.

13 July 2024
17:00 SAST (UTC+02)

South Africa	24–25	Ireland
Pen: Pollard (8/8) 18', 34', 44', 47', 52', 56', 60', 64'		Try: Murray 13' c Con: Crowley (1/1) 14'; Pen: Crowley (4/4) 5', 37', 40+1', 58'; Drop: Frawley (2/2) 69', 80'

Kings Park Stadium, Durban
Attendance: 52,000
Referee: Karl Dickson (England)

Team details

FB	15	Willie le Roux	(substituted off) 2'
RW	14	Cheslin Kolbe
OC	13	Jesse Kriel
IC	12	Damian de Allende
LW	11	Kurt-Lee Arendse
FH	10	Handré Pollard
SH	9	Faf de Klerk	(substituted off) 44'
N8	8	Kwagga Smith
BF	7	Pieter-Steph du Toit
OF	6	Siya Kolisi (c)	(substituted off) 50'
RL	5	Franco Mostert		(substituted off) 16'
LL	4	Eben Etzebeth	8' to 16'		(substituted off) 71'	(substituted on) 73'
TP	3	Frans Malherbe	(substituted off) 45'
HK	2	Bongi Mbonambi	(substituted off) 45'
LP	1	Ox Nché	(substituted off) 56'
Replacements:
HK	16	Malcolm Marx	(substituted on) 45'
PR	17	Gerhard Steenekamp	(substituted on) 56'
PR	18	Vincent Koch	(substituted on) 45'
LK	19	Salmaan Moerat			(substituted on) 71'	(substituted off) 73'
LK	20	RG Snyman	(substituted on) 8'
FL	21	Marco van Staden	(substituted on) 50'
SH	22	Grant Williams	(substituted on) 44'
FH	23	Sacha Feinberg-Mngomezulu	(substituted on) 2'
Coach:
(South Africa) Rassie Erasmus

FB	15	Jamie Osborne
RW	14	Calvin Nash		(substituted off) 61'
OC	13	Garry Ringrose
IC	12	Robbie Henshaw
LW	11	James Lowe
FH	10	Jack Crowley		(substituted off) 59'
SH	9	Conor Murray		(substituted off) 59'
N8	8	Caelan Doris (c)	(yellow card) 46'
OF	7	Josh van der Flier		(substituted off) 56'
BF	6	Tadhg Beirne
RL	5	James Ryan		(substituted off) 56'
LL	4	Joe McCarthy
TP	3	Tadhg Furlong		(substituted off) 44'
HK	2	Rónan Kelleher		(substituted off) 65'
LP	1	Andrew Porter		(substituted off) 56'
Replacements:
HK	16	Rob Herring		(substituted on) 65'
PR	17	Cian Healy		(substituted on) 56'
PR	18	Finlay Bealham		(substituted on) 44'
LK	19	Ryan Baird		(substituted on) 56'
FL	20	Peter O'Mahony		(substituted on) 56'
SH	21	Caolin Blade		(substituted on) 59'
FH	22	Ciarán Frawley		(substituted on) 59'
CE	23	Stuart McCloskey		(substituted on) 61'
Coach:
(England) Andy Farrell

Player of the Match:
Ox Nché (South Africa)
Assistant referees:
Luke Pearce (England)
Craig Evans (Wales)
Television match official:
Ian Tempest (England)
Foul play review officer:
Ben Whitehouse (Wales)

13 July 2024
16:00 ART (UTC-03)

Argentina	33–25	France
Try: Bello 16' c Penalty try 29'; S. Carreras 36' c Gallo (2) 57' m, 66' c Con: S. Carreras (3/4) 18', 38', 66'	Report	Try: Serin 9' c Gailleton 45' c Attissogbé 49' m Con: Hastoy (2/3) 10', 46'; Pen: Hastoy (2/2) 24', 41'

José Amalfitani Stadium, Buenos Aires
Attendance: 50,000
Referee: Andrew Brace (Ireland)

Team details

FB	15	Santiago Cordero
RW	14	Bautista Delguy	(substituted off) 56'
OC	13	Matías Moroni
IC	12	Santiago Chocobares
LW	11	Mateo Carreras
FH	10	Santiago Carreras	(substituted off) 71'
SH	9	Lautaro Bazán Velez	(substituted off) 46'
N8	8	Joaquín Oviedo
OF	7	Marcos Kremer
BF	6	Pablo Matera
RL	5	Lucas Paulos	(substituted off) 56'
LL	4	Franco Molina	(substituted off) 48'
TP	3	Eduardo Bello	(substituted off) 48'
HK	2	Julián Montoya (c)	(substituted off) 21'
LP	1	Mayco Vivas	(substituted off) 40'
Replacements:
HK	16	Ignacio Ruiz	(substituted on) 21'
PR	17	Thomas Gallo	(substituted on) 40'
PR	18	Lucio Sordoni	(substituted on) 48'
LK	19	Matías Alemanno	(substituted on) 48'
LK	20	Pedro Rubiolo	(substituted on) 56'
SH	21	Gonzalo Bertranou	(substituted on) 46'
FH	22	Tomás Albornoz	(substituted on) 56'
CE	23	Matías Orlando	(substituted on) 71'
Coach:
(Argentina) Felipe Contepomi

FB	15	Léo Barré
RW	14	Théo Attissogbé
OC	13	Émilien Gailleton
IC	12	Antoine Frisch
LW	11	Lester Etien
FH	10	Antoine Hastoy
SH	9	Baptiste Serin (c)		(substituted off) 67'
N8	8	Jordan Joseph		(substituted off) 40'
OF	7	Judicaël Cancoriet
BF	6	Lenni Nouchi
RL	5	Baptiste Pesenti		(substituted off) 40'
LL	4	Mickaël Guillard		(substituted off) 62'
TP	3	Georges-Henri Colombe	(yellow card) 56'	(substituted off) 26'	(substituted on) 41'
HK	2	Gaëtan Barlot
LP	1	Jean-Baptiste Gros		(substituted off) 56'
Replacements:
HK	16	Teddy Baubigny		(substituted on) 62'	(substituted off) 67'
PR	17	Sébastien Taofifénua		(substituted on) 56'
PR	18	Demba Bamba		(substituted on) 26'	(substituted off) 41'
LK	19	Posolo Tuilagi		(substituted on) 40'	(substituted off) 62'	(substituted on) 67'
FL	20	Romain Briatte		(substituted on) 40'
FL	21	Killian Tixeront			(substituted on) 67'
SH	22	Baptiste Jauneau		(substituted on) 67'
FH	23	Léo Berdeu
Coach:
(France) Fabien Galthié

Assistant referees:
Chris Busby (Ireland)
Eoghan Cross (Ireland)
Television match official:
Quinton Immelman (South Africa)
Foul play review officer:
Marius van der Westhuizen (South Africa)

Notes:

- Pablo Matera (Argentina) became the third Argentine player to earn his 100th test cap.
- Romain Briatte, Baptiste Jauneau and Killian Tixeront (all France) made their international debuts.
- Argentina win a home test match for the first time since their 48–17 victory over Australia during the 2022 Rugby Championship.
- Argentina earn their first win over France since 2016.

13 July 2024
15:00 CLT (UTC-04)

Chile	33–5	Belgium
Try: Penalty try 18'; Game 39' c Dittus 64' c Con: S. Videla (2/2) 40', 65'; Pen: S. Videla (4/4) 3', 31', 42', 71'	Report	Try: Raynier 55' m

Estadio Sausalito, Viña del Mar
Attendance: 12,000
Referee: Tómas Bertazza (Argentina)

Notes:

- Santiago Videla surpassed Javier Valderrama's record as Chile's top point scorer, scoring 242 points.
- This was the first international between these two sides.

13 July 2024
20:00 PYT (UTC-04)

Paraguay	12–80	Hong Kong
Try: Amarilla 28' c Aranda 69' m Con: Urbieta (1/2) 29'	Report	Try: Post (2) 3' c, 40' c Hrstich (2) 6' c, 44' c Worley (2) 9' c, 12' c Axten-Burrett 16' m Higson-Smith 32' c Brechin (2) 59' m, 78' c Scott 66' c Van der Smit 80' c Con: De Thierry (10/12) 4', 7', 10', 13', 33', 40', 45', 67', 79', 80'

Estadio Héroes de Curupayty, Luque
Attendance: 1,000
Referee: Francisco González (Uruguay)

Notes:

- This was the first international between these two sides.

=== 19/20/21 July ===
19 July 2024
15:30 TOT (UTC+13)

Tonga	20–29	Spain
Try: Sakalia 19' m Faiva 51' m Finau-Fetuli 80+2' c Con: Pulini (1/1) 80+3'; Pen: Faiva (1/1) 45'	Report	Try: Bay 35' c Gimeno 60' c Con: Vinuesa (2/2) 30', 61'; Pen: Vinuesa (5/7) 5', 12', 37', 70', 79'

Teufaiva Sport Stadium, Nukuʻalofa
Referee: Pierre Brousset (France)

Team details

FB	15	Telusa Veainu
RW	14	John Tapueluelu
OC	13	Fetuli Paea
IC	12	Malakai Fekitoa
LW	11	Hosea Saumaki		(substituted off) 40'
FH	10	James Faiva		(substituted off) 61'
SH	9	Manu Paea		(substituted off) 40'
N8	8	Lotu Inisi		(substituted off) 40'
OF	7	Fotu Lokotui
BF	6	Josh Kaifa
RL	5	Harison Mataele		(substituted off) 70'
LL	4	Adam Coleman	(yellow card) 42'
TP	3	Ben Tameifuna (c)		(substituted off) 52'
HK	2	Sosefo Sakalia		(substituted off) 75'
LP	1	Tau Koloamatangi		(substituted off) 52'	(substituted on) 70'
Replacements:
HK	16	Solomone Aniseko		(substituted on) 75'
PR	17	Jethro Felemi		(substituted on) 52'	(substituted off) 70'
PR	18	Brandon Televave		(substituted on) 52'
LK	19	Kelemete Finau-Fetuli		(substituted on) 70'
FL	20	Sione Takai		(substituted on) 40'
SH	21	Aisea Halo		(substituted on) 40'
FH	22	Tyler Pulini		(substituted on) 61'
CE	23	Nikolai Foliaki		(substituted on) 40'
Coach:
(Tonga) Tevita Tu'ifa

FB	15	J. W. Bell
RW	14	Manuel Alfaro		(substituted off) 68'
OC	13	Alex Alonso		(substituted off) 70'
IC	12	Álvar Gimeno
LW	11	Gauthier Minguillón
FH	10	Gonzalo Vinuesa
SH	9	Tany Bay		(substituted off) 75'
N8	8	Raphael Nieto
OF	7	Marc Sánchez		(substituted off) 66'
BF	6	Mario Pichardie (c)		(substituted off) 3'
RL	5	Imanol Urraza
LL	4	Asier Usárraga
TP	3	Hugo Pirlet		(substituted off) 61'
HK	2	Santiago Ovejero		(substituted off) 54'
LP	1	Thierry Futeu		(substituted off) 77'
Replacements:
HK	16	Álvaro García		(substituted on) 54'
PR	17	Raúl Calzón		(substituted on) 77'
PR	18	Lucas Santamaría		(substituted on) 61'
LK	26	Ignacio Piñeiro	(yellow card) 54'	(substituted on) 3'
FL	20	Álex Saleta		(substituted on) 66'
SH	21	Pablo Pérez		(substituted on) 75'
FH	22	Bautista Güemes		(substituted on) 68'
CE	23	Iñaki Mateu		(substituted on) 70'
Coach:
(Argentina) Pablo Bouza

Assistant referees:
Ben O'Keeffe (New Zealand)
Jordan Kaminski (Australia)

Notes:

- Solomone Aniseko, Tyler Pulini, Sione Takai, John Tapueluelu, Brandon Televave (all Tonga) and Manuel Alfaro (Spain) made their international debuts.
- This was the first time Tonga has hosted Spain in a test match.
- This was Spain's first victory against Tonga, as well as their first win over any of the Pacific Island nations.

19 July 2024
19:55 AEST (UTC+10)

Queensland Reds	35–36	Wales
Try: Asiata (3) 13' c, 27' c, 51' c Grealy (2) 59' c, 69' c Con: O'Connor (5/5) 14', 28', 53', 61', 70'	Report	Try: Griffin 4' m Grace 18' c Dyer 20' c Tshiunza 38' m Tompkins 45' c Hardy 79' m Con: Costelow (3/6) 19', 21', 46'

Lang Park, Brisbane
Attendance: 23,164
Referee: Damon Murphy (Australia)

Team details

FB	15	(Australia) Jock Campbell (c)
RW	14	(Australia) Floyd Aubrey	(substituted off) 47'
OC	13	(Australia) Tim Ryan
IC	12	(New Zealand) Dre Pakeho
LW	11	(Australia) Mac Grealy
FH	10	(Australia) James O'Connor
SH	9	(Australia) Louis Werchon	(substituted off) 79'
N8	8	(New Zealand) Joe Brial	(substituted off) 79'
OF	7	(Australia) John Bryant
BF	6	(Australia) Seru Uru
RL	5	(Australia) Ryan Smith
LL	4	(Australia) Connor Vest	(substituted off) 51'
TP	3	(Samoa) Jeffery Toomaga-Allen	(substituted off) 79'
HK	2	(Australia) Richie Asiata	(substituted off) 63'
LP	1	(Australia) Sef Fa'agase	(substituted off) 53'
Replacements:
HK	16	(Cook Islands) George Blake	(substituted on) 63'
PR	17	(Australia) Matt Gibbon	(substituted on) 53'
PR	18	(Australia) Massimo De Lutiis	(substituted on) 79'
LK	19	(Australia) Josh Canham	(substituted on) 51'
FL	20	(Australia) Connor Anderson	(substituted on) 79'
SH	21	(Australia) Will Cartwright	(substituted on) 79'
FH	22	(Australia) Mason Gordon
WG	23	(Australia) Lachie Anderson	(substituted on) 47'
Coach:
Les Kiss

FB	15	Cameron Winnett
RW	14	Rio Dyer
OC	13	Nick Tompkins
IC	12	Eddie James		(substituted off) 71'
LW	11	Regan Grace		(substituted off) 75'
FH	10	Sam Costelow
SH	9	Gareth Davies (c)		(substituted off) 71'
N8	8	Mackenzie Martin		(substituted off) 29'	(substituted on) 37'	(substituted off) 71'
OF	7	Taine Plumtree
BF	6	Christ Tshiunza		(substituted off) 45'
RL	5	Dafydd Jenkins
LL	4	Matthew Screech
TP	3	Archie Griffin		(substituted off) 61'
HK	2	Evan Lloyd	(yellow card) 25'
LP	1	Kemsley Mathias		(substituted off) 54'
Replacements:
HK	16	Efan Daniel		(substituted on) 29'	(substituted off) 37'
PR	17	Corey Domachowski		(substituted on) 54'
PR	18	Harri O'Connor		(substituted on) 61'
HK	19	Dewi Lake				(substituted on) 71'
FL	20	Tommy Reffell		(substituted on) 45'
SH	21	Kieran Hardy		(substituted on) 71'
CE	22	Ben Thomas		(substituted on) 75'
CE	23	Mason Grady		(substituted on) 71'
Coach:
Warren Gatland

Assistant referees:
Matt Kellehan (Australia)
Jeremy Markey (Australia)
Television match official:
Graham Cooper (Australia)

19 July 2024
19:30 PT (UTC-08)

New Zealand	47–5	Fiji
Try: Clarke 8' c Ratima 12' c Proctor 25' m Savea 33' c Reece 43' c de Groot 58' c Bell 76' c Con: McKenzie (6/7) 9', 13', 34', 45', 59', 78'	Report	Try: Botitu 17' m

Snapdragon Stadium, San Diego, United States
Attendance: 33,217
Referee: Matthew Carley (England)

Team details

FB	15	Beauden Barrett	(substituted off) 72'
RW	14	Sevu Reece	(substituted off) 59'
OC	13	Billy Proctor
IC	12	Anton Lienert-Brown
LW	11	Caleb Clarke
FH	10	Damian McKenzie
SH	9	Cortez Ratima	(substituted off) 35'
N8	8	Ardie Savea	(substituted off) 55'
OF	7	Ethan Blackadder
BF	6	Luke Jacobson
RL	5	Tupou Vaa'i	(substituted off) 59'
LL	4	Scott Barrett (c)
TP	3	Fletcher Newell	(substituted off) 55'
HK	2	Asafo Aumua	(substituted off) 55'
LP	1	Tamaiti Williams	(substituted off) 50'
Replacements:
HK	16	George Bell	(substituted on) 55'
PR	17	Ethan de Groot	(substituted on) 50'
PR	18	Pasilio Tosi	(substituted on) 55'
LK	19	Sam Darry	(substituted on) 59'
FL	20	Wallace Sititi	(substituted on) 55'
SH	21	Noah Hotham	(substituted on) 35'
CE	22	Jordie Barrett	(substituted on) 72'
WG	23	Emoni Narawa	(substituted on) 59'
Coach:
(New Zealand) Scott Robertson

FB	15	Vilimoni Botitu
RW	14	Jiuta Wainiqolo
OC	13	Waisea Nayacalevu (c)
IC	12	Inia Tabuavou	(substituted off) 47'
LW	11	Semi Radradra
FH	10	Isaiah Armstrong-Ravula	(substituted off) 59'
SH	9	Frank Lomani	(substituted off) 26'
N8	8	Viliame Mata	(substituted off) 60'
OF	7	Kitione Salawa	(substituted off) 52'
BF	6	Lekima Tagitagivalu
RL	5	Temo Mayanavanua
LL	4	Isoa Nasilasila
TP	3	Mesake Doge	(substituted off) 40'
HK	2	Tevita Ikanivere	(substituted off) 66'
LP	1	Eroni Mawi	(substituted off) 40'
Replacements:
HK	16	Zuriel Togiatama	(substituted on) 66'
PR	17	Haereiti Hetet	(substituted on) 40'
PR	18	Samu Tawake	(substituted on) 40'
N8	19	Albert Tuisue	(substituted on) 60'
FL	20	Elia Canakaivata	(substituted on) 52'
SH	21	Simione Kuruvoli	(substituted on) 26'
FH	22	Caleb Muntz	(substituted on) 59'
FB	23	Sireli Maqala	(substituted on) 47'
Coach:
(Australia) Mick Byrne

Assistant referees:
Anthony Woodthorpe (England)
Luke Rogan (United States)
Television match official:
Ian Tempest (England)
Foul play review officer:
Chris Assmus (Canada)

Notes:

- George Bell, Sam Darry, Noah Hotham, Billy Proctor, Wallace Sititi and Pasilio Tosi (all New Zealand) made their international debuts.
- Damian McKenzie (New Zealand) earned his 50th test cap.
- Beauden Barrett (New Zealand) played his 126th test cap, surpassing Aaron Smith as the most-capped back in All Blacks history.

20 July 2024
15:45 AEST (UTC+10)

Australia	40–29	Georgia
Try: Paisami 4' c Valetini (2) 12' m, 53' c Kailea 19' c McReight (2) 39' c, 62' c Con: Donaldson (5/6) 6', 19', 40', 55', 63'	Report	Try: Babunashvili 33' c Niniashvili 42' c Tabutsadze (2) 46' c, 68' m Con: Matkava (3/4) 34', 43', 48'; Pen: Matkava (1/2) 2'

Sydney Football Stadium, Sydney
Attendance: 26,139
Referee: James Doleman (New Zealand)

Team details

FB	15	Tom Wright
RW	14	Filipo Daugunu	(red card) 35'
OC	13	Len Ikitau
IC	12	Hunter Paisami
LW	11	Darby Lancaster
FH	10	Ben Donaldson		(substituted off) 72'
SH	9	Tate McDermott		(substituted off) 64'
N8	8	Harry Wilson
OF	7	Fraser McReight
BF	6	Rob Valetini		(substituted off) 70'
RL	5	Angus Blyth		(substituted off) 49'
LL	4	Nick Frost
TP	3	Allan Alaalatoa		(substituted off) 60'
HK	2	Billy Pollard		(substituted off) 49'
LP	1	Isaac Kailea		(substituted off) 60'
Replacements:
HK	16	Josh Nasser		(substituted on) 49'
PR	17	Alex Hodgman		(substituted on) 60'
PR	18	Zane Nonggorr		(substituted on) 60'
FL	19	Tom Hooper		(substituted on) 49'
LK	20	Jeremy Williams		(substituted on) 70'
SH	21	Nic White		(substituted on) 64'
FH	22	Noah Lolesio		(substituted on) 72'
FB	23	Andrew Kellaway		(substituted on) 55'
Coach:
(New Zealand) Joe Schmidt

FB	15	Davit Niniashvili	(yellow card) 51'
RW	14	Aka Tabutsadze
OC	13	Tornike Kakhoidze
IC	12	Giorgi Kveseladze
LW	11	Alexander Todua		(substituted off) 36'
FH	10	Luka Matkava
SH	9	Mikheil Alania		(substituted off) 43'
N8	8	Tornike Jalaghonia		(substituted off) 70'
OF	7	Beka Saghinadze (c)
BF	6	Giorgi Tsutskiridze		(substituted off) 40'
RL	5	Mikheil Babunashvili
LL	4	Lado Chachanidze		(substituted off) 60'
TP	3	Alexsandre Kuntelia		(substituted off) 57'
HK	2	Vano Karkadze		(substituted off) 51'
LP	1	Giorgi Mamaiashvili		(substituted off) 64'
Replacements:
HK	16	Luka Petriashvili		(substituted on) 51'
PR	17	Luka Goginava		(substituted on) 64'
PR	18	Irakli Aptsiauri		(substituted on) 57'
LK	19	Lasha Jaiani		(substituted on) 60'
FL	20	Luka Ivanishvili		(substituted on) 40'
FL	21	Ioane Iashaghashvili		(substituted on) 70'
SH	22	Vasil Lobzhanidze		(substituted on) 43'
FH	23	Tedo Abzhandadze		(substituted on) 36'
Coach:
(England) Richard Cockerill

Assistant referees:
Paul Williams (New Zealand)
Angus Mabey (New Zealand)
Television match official:
Richard Kelly (New Zealand)
Foul play review officer:
Glenn Newman (New Zealand)

Notes:

- Alex Hodgman, Darby Lancaster (both Australia) and Ioane Iashaghashvili (Georgia) made their international debuts.
- Alex Hodgman also became the first player of the professional era to have played for both New Zealand and Australia, having previously played 4 Tests for New Zealand back in 2020. He also becomes the fourth player since 1973 and after Owen Stephens, to play for both countries (New Zealand and Australia).
- This was the first time Australia has hosted Georgia, and the first time they have faced each other outside of a Rugby World Cup.
- This was the first time Australia has hosted a Tier 2 nation from Europe.
- Filipo Daugunu's sending off became the first 20-minute red card to be issued in a test match.

20 July 2024
17:00 SAST (UTC+02)

South Africa	64–21	Portugal
Try: Wessels 12' m Buthelezi 17' m Arendse 23' c Dixon 26' m Am 38' c Mapimpi (3) 48' m, 56' c, 79' c Horn 64' c A. Venter 68' c Con: Libbok (2/5) 25', 39'; Feinberg-Mngomezulu (5/5) 49', 57', 66', 69', 80+2'	Report	Try: Dos Santos (2) 10' c, 59' c Madeira 74' c Con: Moura (1/1) 11'; Cabral (2/2) 60', 75'

Free State Stadium, Bloemfontein
Attendance: 42,626
Referee: Hollie Davidson (Scotland)

Team details

FB	15	Aphelele Fassi		(substituted off) 58'
RW	14	Kurt-Lee Arendse	(yellow card) 33'
OC	13	Lukhanyo Am
IC	12	André Esterhuizen	(red card) 2'
LW	11	Makazole Mapimpi
FH	10	Manie Libbok		(substituted off) 44'
SH	9	Cobus Reinach		(substituted off) 44'
N8	8	Evan Roos		(substituted off) 46'
BF	7	Ben-Jason Dixon
OF	6	Phepsi Buthelezi		(substituted off) 58'
RL	5	RG Snyman
LL	4	Salmaan Moerat (c)
TP	3	Thomas du Toit		(substituted off) 58'
HK	2	Johan Grobbelaar		(substituted off) 57'
LP	1	Jan-Hendrik Wessels		(substituted off) 53'
Replacements:
HK	16	Andre-Hugo Venter		(substituted on) 57'
PR	17	Ntuthuko Mchunu		(substituted on) 53'
PR	18	Trevor Nyakane		(substituted on) 58'
LK	19	Ruan Venter		(substituted on) 58'
FL	20	Elrigh Louw		(substituted on) 46'
SH	21	Morné van den Berg		(substituted on) 44'
FH	22	Sacha Feinberg-Mngomezulu		(substituted on) 44'
FB	23	Quan Horn	(yellow card) 74'	(substituted on) 58'
Coach:
(South Africa) Rassie Erasmus

FB	15	Simão Bento
RW	14	Manuel Cardoso Pinto
OC	13	José Lima	(substituted off) 2'
IC	12	Tomás Appleton (c)
LW	11	Rodrigo Marta
FH	10	Joris Moura	(substituted off) 40'
SH	9	Hugo Camacho	(substituted off) 58'
N8	8	Vasco Baptista	(substituted off) 22'
OF	7	Diego Pinheiro
BF	6	José Madeira
RL	5	Duarte Torgal
LL	4	Nicolas Fernandes	(substituted off) 50'
TP	3	Diogo Hasse Ferreira	(substituted off) 36'	(substituted on) 70'
HK	2	Luka Begic	(substituted off) 54'	(substituted on) 66'
LP	1	Francisco Fernandes	(substituted off) 36'
Replacements:
PR	16	David Costa	(substituted on) 36'
HK	17	Pedro Vicente	(substituted on) 54'	(substituted off) 66'
PR	18	Abel da Cunha	(substituted on) 36'	(substituted off) 70'
LK	19	António Rebelo de Andrade	(substituted on) 50'
FL	20	André da Cunha	(substituted on) 22'
SH	21	Pedro Lucas	(substituted on) 58'
FH	22	Domingos Cabral	(substituted on) 40'
WG	23	José Paiva dos Santos	(substituted on) 2'
Coach:
(New Zealand) Simon Mannix

Player of the Match:
RG Snyman (South Africa)
Assistant referees:
Craig Evans (Wales)
Mike Adamson (Scotland)
Television match official:
Andrew McMenemy (Scotland)
Foul play review officer:
Andrew Jackson (England)

Notes:

- Phepsi Buthelezi, Johan Grobbelaar, Quan Horn, Morné van den Berg, Andre-Hugo Venter, Ruan Venter, Jan-Hendrik Wessels (all South Africa) and Nicolas Fernandes (Portugal) made their international debuts.
- Francisco Fernandes (Portugal) earned his 50th test cap.
- This was the first international between these two sides.

20 July 2024
15:30 BRT (UTC-03)

Brazil	25–26	Hong Kong
Try: Mignot 16' c Paganini 58' m Penalty try 64'; Con: Tranquez (1/1) 18'; Pen: Tranquez (1/1) 39'; Duque (1/1) 70'	Report	Try: Van der Smit 10' c Worley 33' c Avitabile 67' m Brien 80' c Con: De Thierry (3/4) 11', 34', 80+1'

Estádio Nicolau Alayon, São Paulo
Attendance: 1,750
Referee: Pablo De Luca (Argentina)

Team details

FB	15	Lucas Tranquez
RW	14	Robert Tenório
OC	13	Carlo Mignot
IC	12	Lorenzo Massari	(substituted off) 68'
LW	11	Ariel Rodrigues	(substituted off) 30'	(substituted on) 40'	(substituted off) 52'
FH	10	João Amaral
SH	9	Felipe Gonçalves
N8	8	André Arruda
BF	7	Matheus Cláudio	(substituted off) 52'
OF	6	Cléber Dias (c)
RL	5	Gabriel Oliveira	(substituted off) 68'
LL	4	Ben Donald	(substituted off) 56'
TP	3	Matheus Rocha	(substituted off) 66'
HK	2	Endy Willian	(substituted off) 63'
LP	1	João Marino	(substituted off) 66'
Replacements:
HK	16	David Müller	(substituted on) 63'
PR	17	Levy Marinho	(substituted on) 66'
PR	18	Leonel Moreno	(substituted on) 66'
LK	19	Gabriel Paganini	(substituted on) 56'
FL	20	Adrio de Melo	(substituted on) 52'
FL	21	Maiki Lemes	(substituted on) 68'
FH	22	Lucas Spago	(substituted on) 68'
CE	23	Moisés Duque	(substituted on) 30'	(substituted off) 40'	(substituted on) 52'
Coach:
(Uruguay) Emiliano Caffera

FB	15	Matt Worley
RW	14	Seb Brien
OC	13	Nathan De Thierry
IC	12	Benjamin Axten-Burrett
LW	11	Paul Altier	(substituted off) 60'
FH	10	Matteo Avitabile
SH	9	Jack Combes	(substituted off) 70'
N8	8	Luke van der Smit	(substituted off) 60'
OF	7	James Sawyer	(substituted off) 60'
BF	6	Joshua Hrstich (c)
RL	5	Callum McCullough
LL	4	Kyle Sullivan	(substituted off) 74'
TP	3	Zac Cinnamond	(substituted off) 56'
HK	2	Alexander Post	(substituted off) 56'
LP	1	Rory Cinnamond	(substituted off) 56'
Replacements:
HK	16	Calum Scott	(substituted on) 56'
PR	17	James Holmes	(substituted on) 56'
PR	18	Faizal Solomona	(substituted on) 56'
LK	19	Jamie Pincott	(substituted on) 76'
FL	20	Tyler McNutt	(substituted on) 60'
FL	21	Pierce MacKinlay-West	(substituted on) 60'
SH	22	Bryn Phillips	(substituted on) 70'
WG	23	Harry Sayers	(substituted on) 60'
Coach:
(New Zealand) Andrew Douglas

Assistant referees:
Simón Larrubia (Argentina)
Federico Solari (Argentina)
Television match official:
Victor Hugo Barboza (Brazil)

Notes:

- Maiki Lemes, João Marino and Carlo Mignot (all Brazil) make their international debuts.

20 July 2024
16:00 UYT (UTC-03)

Uruguay	5–79	Argentina
Try: Hontou 44' m		Try: Mendy (3) 4' m, 10' m, 41' c De la Fuente 26' c Cordero 28' c Moro (2) 34' c, 70' c Oviedo 37' m M. Carreras (2) 40' m, 63' c Coria 51' c S. Carreras 76' c Con: Albornoz (8/12) 27', 29', 35', 42', 51', 64', 70', 76'; Pen: Albornoz (1/1) 18'

Estadio Domingo Burgueño, Maldonado, Uruguay
Referee: Luc Ramos (France)

Team details

FB	15	Ignacio Álvarez
RW	14	Juan Manuel Alonso
OC	13	Tomás Inciarte
IC	12	Andrés Vilaseca (c)	(substituted off) 36'
LW	11	Nicolás Freitas
FH	10	Felipe Etcheverry
SH	9	Santiago Álvarez	(substituted off) 55'
N8	8	Manuel Diana	(substituted off) 43'
OF	7	Santiago Civetta	(substituted off) 55'
BF	6	Manuel Ardao
RL	5	Manuel Leindekar
LL	4	Felipe Aliaga	(substituted off) 67'
TP	3	Reinaldo Piussi	(substituted off) 43'
HK	2	Germán Kessler	(substituted off) 43'
LP	1	Mateo Sanguinetti	(substituted off) 43'
Replacements:
HK	16	Guillermo Pujadas	(substituted on) 43'
PR	17	Ignacio Péculo	(substituted on) 43'
PR	18	Diego Arbelo	(substituted on) 43'
LK	19	Diego Magno	(substituted on) 67'
FL	20	Lucas Bianchi	(substituted on) 43'
N8	21	Carlos Deus	(substituted on) 55'
CE	22	Joaquín Suárez	(substituted on) 55'
FB	23	Juan Bautista Hontou	(substituted on) 36'
Coach:
(Argentina) Rodolfo Ambrosio

FB	15	Santiago Cordero
RW	14	Ignacio Mendy
OC	13	Santiago Chocobares	(substituted off) 40'
IC	12	Jeronimo de la Fuente
LW	11	Mateo Carreras	(substituted off) 64'
FH	10	Tomás Albornoz
SH	9	Gonzalo Bertranou	(substituted off) 50'
N8	8	Joaquín Oviedo
OF	7	Marcos Kremer (c)	(substituted off) 50'
BF	6	Joaquín Moro
RL	5	Pedro Rubiolo
LL	4	Franco Molina	(substituted off) 60'
TP	3	Eduardo Bello	(substituted off) 46'
HK	2	Ignacio Ruiz	(substituted off) 60'
LP	1	Thomas Gallo	(substituted off) 46'
Replacements:
HK	16	Ignacio Calles	(substituted on) 60'
PR	17	Mayco Vivas	(substituted on) 46'
PR	18	Francisco Coria	(substituted on) 46'
LK	19	Matías Alemanno	(substituted on) 60'
FL	20	Pablo Matera	(substituted on) 50'
SH	21	Gonzalo García	(substituted on) 50'
FH	22	Santiago Carreras	(substituted on) 64'
CE	23	Matías Orlando	(substituted on) 40'
Coach:
(Argentina) Felipe Contepomi

Assistant referees:
Chris Busby (Ireland)
Frank Méndez (Chile)
Television match official:
Olly Hodges (Ireland)

Notes:

- Juan Bautista Hontou, Joaquín Suárez (both Uruguay), Francisco Coria and Joaquín Moro (both Argentina) made their international debuts.
- This was Argentina's largest winning margin over Uruguay, surpassing the 70–0 victory recorded in 1977.

20 July 2024
15:00 CLT (UTC-04)

Chile	11–52	Scotland
Try: Escobar 49' m Pen: Videla (1/1) 10'; Salas (1/1) 26'	Report	Try: Bayliss 21' c Rowe (2) 28' c, 64' c Dobie (2) 33' c, 44' m Currie 57' c Richardson 72' m Steyn 78' c Con: Healy (3/4) 22', 29', 35'; Hastings (3/4) 58', 65', 79'

Estadio Nacional, Santiago
Attendance: 24,878
Referee: Mathieu Raynal (France)

Team details

FB	15	Diego Warnken		(substituted off) 71'
RW	14	Cristóbal Game			(substituted off) 63'	(substituted on) 70'
OC	13	Domingo Saavedra		(substituted off) 75'
IC	12	Santiago Videla		(substituted off) 44'
LW	11	Nicolás Garafulic
FH	10	Tomás Salas
SH	9	Lucas Berti		(substituted off) 18'
N8	8	Alfonso Escobar
OF	7	Raimundo Martínez
BF	6	Martín Sigren (c)
RL	5	Javier Eissmann		(substituted off) 68'
LL	4	Clemente Saavedra
TP	3	Matías Dittus		(substituted off) 59'
HK	2	Augusto Böhme		(substituted off) 46'	(substituted on) 63'	(substituted off) 70'
LP	1	Javier Carrasco		(substituted off) 46'
Replacements:
HK	16	Diego Escobar	(yellow card) 60'	(substituted on) 46'
PR	17	Salvador Lues		(substituted on) 46'
PR	18	Iñaki Gurruchaga		(substituted on) 59'
LK	19	Santiago Pedrero		(substituted on) 68'
FL	20	Joaquín Milesi		(substituted on) 75'
SH	21	Marcelo Torrealba		(substituted on) 18'
FH	22	Benjamín Videla		(substituted on) 71'
WG	23	Josés Larenas		(substituted on) 44'
Coach:
(Uruguay) Pablo Lemoine

FB	15	Kyle Rowe
RW	14	Jamie Dobie
OC	13	Kyle Steyn
IC	12	Sione Tuipulotu (cc)	(substituted off) 59'
LW	11	Arron Reed
FH	10	Ben Healy	(substituted off) 51'
SH	9	Gus Warr	(substituted off) 51'
N8	8	Josh Bayliss
OF	7	Jamie Ritchie (cc)	(substituted off) 72'
BF	6	Gregor Brown	(substituted off) 60'
RL	5	Ewan Johnson
LL	4	Alex Craig	(substituted off) 51'
TP	3	Will Hurd	(substituted off) 51'
HK	2	Dylan Richardson
LP	1	Nathan McBeth	(substituted off) 51'
Replacements:
HK	16	Patrick Harrison	(substituted on) 51'
PR	17	Pierre Schoeman	(substituted on) 51'
PR	18	Javan Sebastian	(substituted on) 51'
LK	19	Max Williamson	(substituted on) 60'
FL	20	Rory Darge	(substituted on) 72'
FH	21	Adam Hastings	(substituted on) 51'
CE	22	Stafford McDowall	(substituted on) 59'
CE	23	Matt Currie	(substituted on) 51'
Coach:
(Scotland) Gregor Townsend

Assistant referees:
Andrew Brace (Ireland)
Gonzalo de Achaval (Argentina)
Television match official:
Marius van der Westhuizen (South Africa)

Notes:

- Diego Warnken (Chile) and Patrick Harrison (Scotland) made their international debuts.
- This was the first full test match between these nations.

20 July 2024
18:15 PYT (UTC-04)

Paraguay	20–45	Belgium
Try: González 2' m Bareiro 32' c López 79' m Con: Urbieta (1/3) 33'; Pen: Urbieta (1/1) 10'	Report	Try: Raynier (2) 6' c, 12' c M. Remue; Rifon 46' c van Parys 59'; Con: F. Remue (3/3) 7', 14', 47'; Torfs (1/1) 60'; Pen: F. Remue (2/2) 26', 55'

Estadio Héroes de Curupayty, Luque
Referee: Mauro Rossi (Argentina)

Notes:

- This was the first international between these two sides.

20 July 2024
17:00 PDT (UTC-07)

Vancouver Highlanders (Canada)	30–26	Germany

Burnaby Lake Rugby Club, Burnaby

21 July 2024
14:05 JST (UTC+09)

Japan	14–42	Italy
Try: Riley (2) 40+2' c, 42' c Con: Matsuda (2/2) 40+2', 42'	Report	Try: Capuozzo 8' c Page-Relo 13' c Zambonin 35' c A. Garbisi 72' c Vintcent 80' m Con: P. Garbisi (3/3) 9', 14', 35'; Marin (1/2) 73'; Pen: Page-Relo (3/3) 3', 47', 59'

Sapporo Dome, Sapporo
Attendance: 20,000
Referee: Christophe Ridley (England)

Team details

FB	15	Yoshitaka Yazaki
RW	14	Jone Naikabula	(substituted off) 62'
OC	13	Dylan Riley
IC	12	Samisoni Tua
LW	11	Tomoki Osada
FH	10	Rikiya Matsuda	(substituted off) 48'
SH	9	Taiki Koyama	(substituted off) 40'
N8	8	Faulua Makisi
OF	7	Michael Leitch (c)
BF	6	Amanaki Saumaki	(substituted off) 49'
RL	5	Warner Dearns
LL	4	Eishin Kuwano	(substituted off) 40'
TP	3	Shuhei Takeuchi	(substituted off) 69'
HK	2	Mamoru Harada	(substituted off) 49'
LP	1	Takayoshi Mohara	(substituted off) 37'
Replacements:
HK	16	Atsushi Sakate	(substituted on) 49'
PR	17	Takato Okabe	(substituted on) 37'
PR	18	Keijiro Tamefusa	(substituted on) 69'
LK	19	Sanaila Waqa	(substituted on) 40'
FL	20	Tevita Tatafu	(substituted on) 49'
SH	21	Shinobu Fujiwara	(substituted on) 40'
FH	22	Lee Seung-sin	(substituted on) 48'
FB	23	Takuya Yamasawa	(substituted on) 62'
Coach:
(Australia) Eddie Jones

FB	15	Ange Capuozzo
RW	14	Louis Lynagh		(substituted off) 45'
OC	13	Ignacio Brex
IC	12	Tommaso Menoncello		(substituted off) 77'
LW	11	Jacopo Trulla	(yellow card) 53'
FH	10	Paolo Garbisi		(substituted off) 68'
SH	9	Martin Page-Relo		(substituted off) 61'	(substituted on) 77'	(substituted off) 80'
N8	8	Lorenzo Cannone		(substituted off) 67'
OF	7	Michele Lamaro (c)		(substituted off) 61'
BF	6	Ross Vintcent	(yellow card) 31'
RL	5	Andrea Zambonin
LL	4	Niccolò Cannone
TP	3	Marco Riccioni		(substituted off) 48'
HK	2	Giovanni Nicotera		(substituted off) 48'	(substituted on) 80'
LP	1	Danilo Fischetti		(substituted off) 48'
Replacements:
HK	16	Gianmarco Lucchesi	(yellow card) 74'	(substituted on) 48'
PR	17	Mirco Spagnolo		(substituted on) 48'
PR	18	Simone Ferrari		(substituted on) 48'
LK	19	Federico Ruzza		(substituted on) 67'
FL	20	Manuel Zuliani		(substituted on) 61'
SH	21	Alessandro Garbisi		(substituted on) 61'
FH	22	Leonardo Marin		(substituted on) 68'
CE	23	Marco Zanon		(substituted on) 45'
Coach:
(Argentina) Gonzalo Quesada

Assistant referees:
Nic Berry (Australia)
George Myers (Australia)
Television match official:
Brett Cronan (Australia)
Foul play review officer:
Oli Kellett (Australia)

Notes:

- Eishin Kuwano (Japan) made his international debut.
- This is the first time since 2016, that Japan has lost all of their incoming touring side games during the mid-year international window.

=== 26/27 July ===
26 July 2024
15:30 TOT (UTC+13)

Tonga	14–41	(Australia) Queensland Reds
Try: Hifo 5' c Filimoehala 31' c Con: Ma'asi (2/2) 6', 32'	Report	Try: Fa'agase 10' c Asiata (2) 29' m, 61' c Penalty try 40'; Ryan 47' c Uru 71' m Con: O'Connor (1/2) 11'; Werchon (2/3) 48', 62'; Pen: Gordon (1/1) 79'

Teufaiva Sport Stadium, Nukuʻalofa
Referee: David Vosalevu (Fiji)

Team details

FB	15	Sam Tuitupou
RW	14	Esau Filimoehala
OC	13	John Tapueluelu
IC	12	Nikolai Foliaki
LW	11	Latu Akauola		(substituted off) 67'
FH	10	Semisi Ma'asi		(substituted off) 49'
SH	9	Siaosi Nai		(substituted off) 56'
N8	8	Lotu Inisi
OF	7	Sione Takai	(yellow card) 27'	(substituted off) 40'
BF	6	Sione-Tai Hifo		(substituted off) 49'
RL	5	Vutulongo Puloka
LL	4	Kelemete Finau-Fetuli		(substituted off) 45'	(substituted on) 61'	(substituted off) 67'
TP	3	Brandon Televave		(substituted off) 61'
HK	2	Solomone Aniseko			(substituted off) 61'	(substituted on) 67'
LP	1	Tau Koloamatangi		(substituted off) 61'
Replacements:
HK	16	Sosefo Sakalia		(substituted on) 49'
PR	17	Brad Leuila		(substituted on) 61'
PR	18	Vaka Poleo		(substituted on) 61'
LK	19	Kaufononga Tausinga		(substituted on) 40'
FL	20	Penisimani Pifeleti		(substituted on) 45'
SH	21	Manu Paea		(substituted on) 56'
FH	22	Tyler Pulini		(substituted on) 49'
CE	23	Paea Vakameilalo		(substituted on) 67'
Coach:
(Tonga) Tevita Tu'ifa

FB	15	(Australia) Jock Campbell (c)
RW	14	(Australia) Lachie Anderson
OC	13	(Australia) Tim Ryan
IC	12	(New Zealand) Dre Pakeho
LW	11	(Australia) Mac Grealy	(substituted off) 66'
FH	10	(Australia) James O'Connor	(substituted off) 34'
SH	9	(Australia) Louis Werchon	(substituted off) 72'
N8	8	(New Zealand) Joe Brial	(substituted off) 66'
OF	7	(Australia) John Bryant
BF	6	(Australia) Seru Uru
RL	5	(Australia) Ryan Smith
LL	4	(Australia) Connor Vest	(substituted off) 48'
TP	3	(Australia) Massimo De Lutiis	(substituted off) 53'
HK	2	(Australia) Richie Asiata	(substituted off) 67'
LP	1	(Australia) Sef Fa'agase	(substituted off) 48'
Replacements:
HK	16	(Australia) Feleti Kaitu'u	(substituted on) 67'
PR	17	(Australia) Matt Gibbon	(substituted on) 48'
PR	18	(Samoa) Jeffery Toomaga-Allen	(substituted on) 53'
LK	19	(Australia) Josh Canham	(substituted on) 48'
LK	20	(Australia) Taine Roiri	(substituted on) 66'
SH	21	(Australia) Will Cartwright	(substituted on) 72'
FH	22	(Australia) Mason Gordon	(substituted on) 66'
WG	23	(Australia) Floyd Aubrey	(substituted on) 34'
Coach:
(Australia) Les Kiss

27 July 2024
15:30 BRT (UTC-03)

Brazil	47–25	Belgium
Try: Willian 14' c Temer 27' c Teixeira 47' c Mignot 64' c Rodrigues 79' m Con: Tranquez (4/5) 16', 28', 48', 65'; Pen: Tranquez (4/4) 9', 32', 55', 76'	Report	Try: Rasssinfosse 21' m Van Holsbeke 38' c Van Bost 60' c Con: De Franco (2/3) 40', 61'; Pen: De Franco (2/2) 4', 35'

Estádio Nicolau Alayon, São Paulo
Referee: Tómas Bertazza (Argentina)

Notes:

- This was the first time that Brazil has hosted Belgium.

27 July 2024
16:00 UYT (UTC-03)

Uruguay	19–31	Scotland
Try: S. Álvarez 28' c Etcheverry 38' c Diana 61' m Con: Etcheverry (2/3) 29', 39'	Report	Try: Ashman 13' c Crosbie 23' c Van der Merwe 26' m Harrison 64' c Schoeman 68' m Con: Healy (2/3) 13', 24'; Hastings (1/2) 65'

Estadio Charrúa, Montevideo
Referee: Damian Schneider (Argentina)

Team details

FB	15	Ignacio Álvarez
RW	14	Juan Bautista Hontou		(substituted off) 20'
OC	13	Juan Manuel Alonso
IC	12	Tomás Inciarte
LW	11	Nicolás Freitas
FH	10	Felipe Etcheverry
SH	9	Santiago Álvarez
N8	8	Carlos Deus		(substituted off) 56'
OF	7	Lucas Bianchi		(substituted off) 68'
BF	6	Manuel Ardao
RL	5	Manuel Leindekar (c)
LL	4	Felipe Aliaga		(substituted off) 65'
TP	3	Diego Arbelo	(yellow card) 23'	(substituted off) 47'
HK	2	Guillermo Pujadas		(substituted off) 56'	(substituted on) 72'
LP	1	Ignacio Péculo		(substituted off) 68'
Replacements:
HK	16	Joaquín Myszka		(substituted on) 56'	(substituted off) 72'
PR	17	Mateo Sanguinetti		(substituted on) 68'
PR	18	Reinaldo Piussi		(substituted on) 47'
LK	19	Diego Magno		(substituted on) 68'
FL	20	Santiago Civetta		(substituted on) 65'
N8	21	Manuel Diana		(substituted on) 56'
CE	22	Santiago Gini		(substituted on) 20'
FB	23	Joaquín Suárez
Coach:
(Argentina) Rodolfo Ambrosio

FB	15	Harry Paterson
RW	14	Kyle Rowe	(substituted off) 54'
OC	13	Huw Jones
IC	12	Stafford McDowall
LW	11	Duhan van der Merwe
FH	10	Ben Healy	(substituted off) 54'
SH	9	George Horne	(substituted off) 62'
N8	8	Matt Fagerson
OF	7	Rory Darge (c)
BF	6	Luke Crosbie	(substituted off) 62'
RL	5	Gregor Brown	(substituted off) 69'
LL	4	Max Williamson
TP	3	Javan Sebastian	(substituted off) 54'
HK	2	Ewan Ashman	(substituted off) 62'
LP	1	Rory Sutherland	(substituted off) 54'
Replacements:
HK	16	Patrick Harrison	(substituted on) 62'
PR	17	Pierre Schoeman	(substituted on) 54'
PR	18	Murphy Walker	(substituted on) 54'
LK	19	Ewan Johnson	(substituted on) 69'
FL	20	Jamie Ritchie	(substituted on) 62'
SH	21	Jamie Dobie	(substituted on) 62'
FH	22	Adam Hastings	(substituted on) 54'
WG	23	Kyle Steyn	(substituted on) 54'
Coach:
(Scotland) Gregor Townsend

Assistant referees:
Mathieu Raynal (France)
Luc Ramos (France)
Television match official:
Olly Hodges (Ireland)

Notes:

- Scott Cummings (Scotland) was named in the starting line-up, but withdrew ahead of the game due to injury. He was replaced by Gregor Brown, whose place on the bench was taken by Ewan Johnson.
- Santiago Gini and Joaquín Myszka (both Uruguay) made their international debuts.
- This was the first time Scotland and Uruguay have faced each other outside of a Rugby World Cup.
- Huw Jones (Scotland) earned his 50th test cap.
- Duhan van der Merwe scored his 28th test try, surpassing Stuart Hogg as Scotland's top try scorer.

== See also ==
- 2024 World Rugby U20 Championship
- 2024 Rugby Championship
- 2024 World Rugby Pacific Nations Cup
- 2024 end-of-year rugby union internationals
