= Killian Tixeront =

French rugby union player (born 2002)

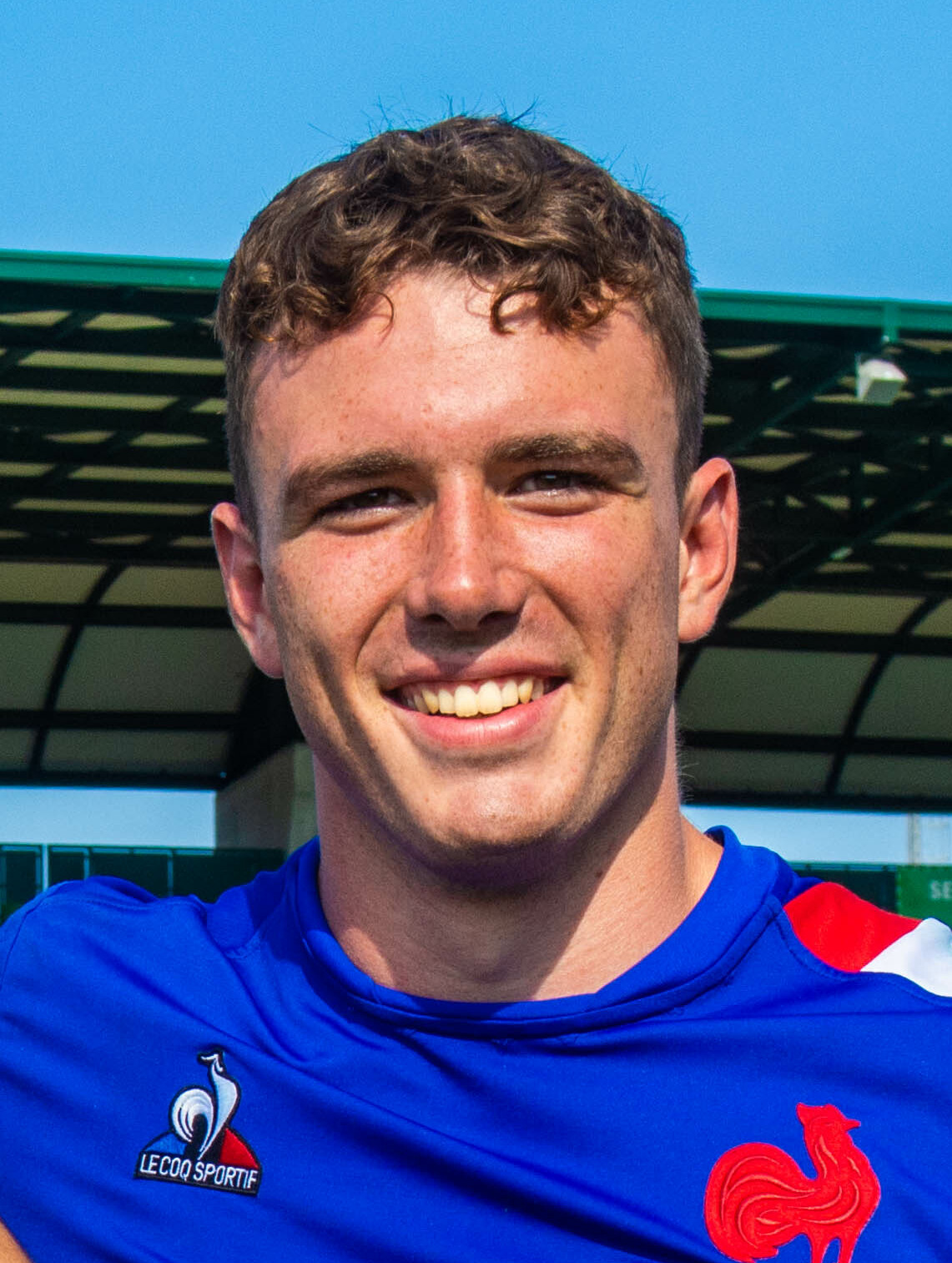
- Born: 22 January 2002 (age 24) Clermont-Ferrand, France
- Height: 196 cm (6 ft 5 in)
- Weight: 107 kg (236 lb; 16 st 12 lb)

Rugby union career
- Position: Flanker / Number 8
- Current team: Clermont
Senior career
Years	Team	Apps	(Points)
2020–	Clermont	92	(35)
- Correct as of 14 December 2025
International career
Years	Team	Apps	(Points)
2021–2022	France U20	10	(0)
2024–	France	3	(0)
- Correct as of 14 December 2025

Killian Tixeront (born 22 January 2002) is a French rugby union player, who plays for Clermont. His preferred position is flanker or number 8.

== Early career ==
Tixeront was born in Clermont-Ferrand and began playing rugby at US Martres-de-Veyre aged 8. He originally played as a wing or centre, before converting to back row. He joined up with the Clermont academy in 2017 attending the Ambroise-Brugière high school as a member of the academy. In 2021 and 2022, he represented the France U20 side.

== Professional career ==
Tixeront made his debut for Clermont in the 2020–21 Top 14 season against Toulon. In March 2022, he extended his contract with the club, going on to make a further three appearances that season. He would also represent the French Barbarians that November, before signing his first professional contract with Clermont in June 2023.

Tixeront was called into the France side for the 2024 mid-year rugby union tests. After appearing for a French Development side against Uruguay, he made his full debut against Argentina the following week.
