= Loris Zarantonello =

Italy international rugby union player

- Born: 17 November 2000 (age 25) L'Union, France
- Height: 178 cm (5 ft 10 in)
- Weight: 102 kg (225 lb; 16 st 1 lb)

Rugby union career
- Position: Hooker
- Current team: Castres
Youth career
- 2005–2012: Coquelicots Montéchois Rugby
- 2012–2019: US Montauban
Senior career
| Years | Team | Apps | (Points) |
| 2019–2023 | Agen | 72 | (30) |
| 2023– | Castres | 68 | (35) |
- Correct as of 17 Sep 2026
International career
| Years | Team | Apps | (Points) |
| 2019–2020 | France U20 | 5 | (0) |
| 2024– | Italy | 1 | (0) |
- Correct as of 9 Jun 2024

Loris Zarantonello (born 17 November 2000) is a professional French-born Italian rugby union player who plays as a Hooker for French Top 14 club Castres and the Italian national team.

== Career ==
Born and raised in France, Zarantonello qualified for Italy through his paternal grandparents. He began his career at Agen before signing for Castres in 2023. After previously playing for the France U20.

He was included in the Italy squad for their 2024 mid-year rugby union tests. On 5 July 2024 he made his debut for Italy against Samoa at Apia Park.
