= Lolani Faleiva =

Samoan rugby union player

- Born: 18 February 1999 (age 27) New Zealand
- Height: 193 cm (6 ft 4 in)
- Weight: 130 kg (287 lb; 20 st 7 lb)
- School: Napier Boys' High School

Rugby union career
- Position: Prop
- Current team: Hawke's Bay
Senior career
| Years | Team | Apps | (Points) |
| 2022–2023 | Toronto Arrows | 25 | (32) |
| 2022– | Hawke's Bay | 15 | (5) |
| 2026 | Moana Pasifika | 5 | (0) |
- Correct as of 16 June 2026
International career
| Years | Team | Apps | (Points) |
| 2024– | Samoa | 3 | (0) |
- Correct as of 20 July 2026

Lolani Faleiva (born 18 February 1999) is a professional rugby union player, who plays as a prop for Hawke's Bay in the National Provincial Championship (NPC). He previously played for Moana Pasifika in Super Rugby. He has represented Manu Samoa internationally.

== Early career ==
Faleiva was born in New Zealand, and attended Napier Boys' High School where he played rugby both as a prop and number eight. He originally played his club rugby in the Hawke's Bay region for Napier Old Boys' Marist before transferring to Taradale.

== Professional career ==
Faleiva's first professional appearances were for the Toronto Arrows in Major League Rugby, having represented them in the 2022 and 2023 seasons. He has been a member of the Hawke's Bay side who compete in the National Provincial Championship having competed for the side since 2022, being named as a replacement player in the 2025 Bunnings NPC. He had previously played professional rugby in the Netherlands in 2019. In 2026, he was called into the Moana Pasifika squad ahead of Round 2 of the 2026 Super Rugby Pacific season, being named as a replacement for the match against the Hurricanes.

In 2024, Faleiva was named in the Samoa squad for the 2024 mid-year rugby union tests, making his international debut against Italy.
