= Tyler Pulini =

Tongan rugby union player

- Born: 24 June 2005 (age 21) New Zealand
- Height: 178 cm (5 ft 10 in)
- School: Westlake Boys High School

Rugby union career
- Position: First five-eighth
Senior career
Years	Team	Apps	(Points)
2026	Moana Pasifika		
- Correct as of 4 March 2026
International career
Years	Team	Apps	(Points)
2024–	Tonga	3	(2)
- Correct as of 4 March 2026

Tyler Pulini (born 24 June 2005) is a Tongan rugby union player, who played for Moana Pasifika in Super Rugby. His preferred position is first five-eighth.

== Early career ==
Pulini was born in New Zealand, and attended Westlake Boys High School where he played rugby. After leaving school, he joined up with the Blues academy, representing their U18 side in 2023. He then joined up with the Moana Pasifika academy, representing their U20 side in 2024 and 2025. He is on Tongan heritage with links to the Neiafu region.

== Professional career ==
Pulini was called into the Moana Pasifika squad ahead of Round 4 of the 2026 Super Rugby Pacific season, being named as a replacement against the Chiefs.

In 2024, Pulini debuted for Tonga against Spain during the 2024 mid-year rugby union tests, coming off the bench and kicking a conversion. He was then called into the Tonga side for the 2024 World Rugby Pacific Nations Cup, winning a further two caps.
