= Romain Briatte =

French rugby union player

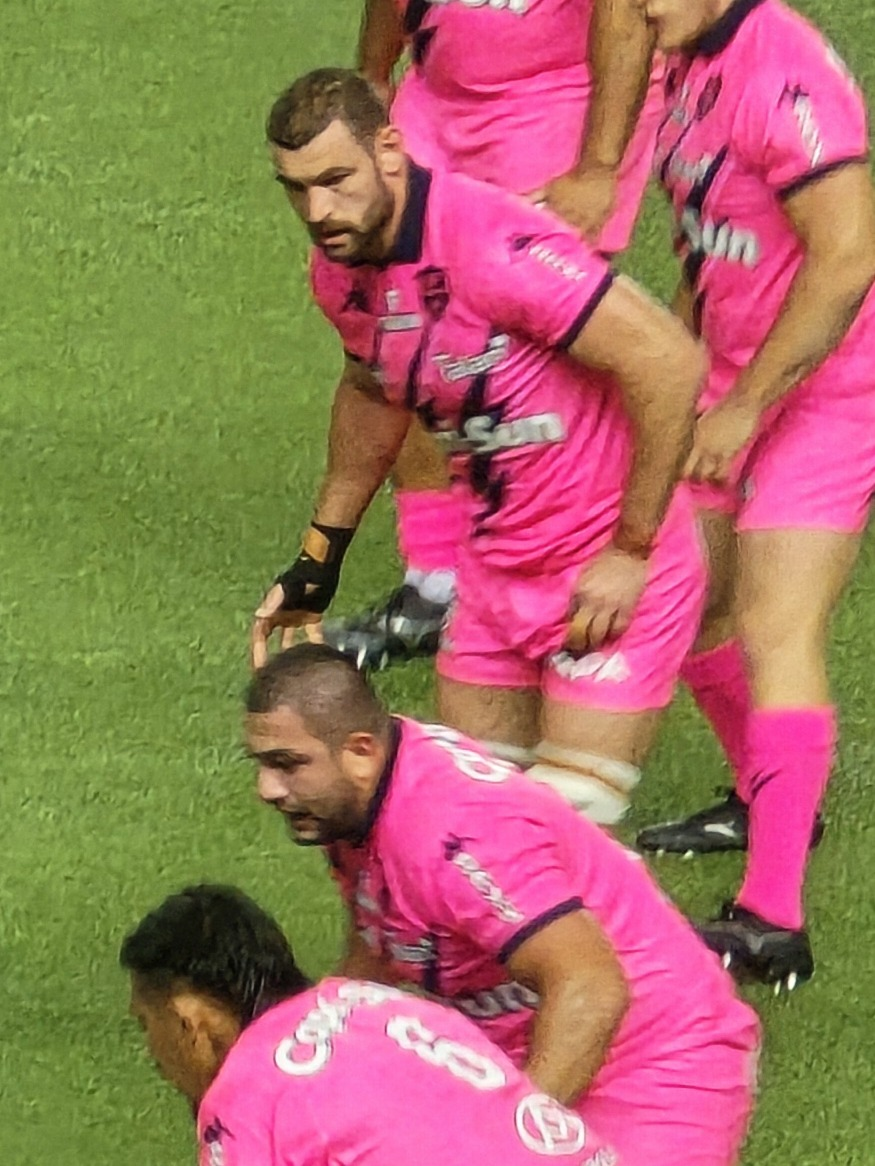
- Born: 18 February 1993 (age 33) Riom, France
- Height: 194 cm (6 ft 4 in)
- Weight: 107 kg (236 lb; 16 st 12 lb)

Rugby union career
- Position: Flanker
- Current team: Stade Français
Senior career
Years	Team	Apps	(Points)
2014–2018	Aurillac	68	(30)
2018–2021	Agen	52	(5)
2021–	Stade Français	99	(40)
- Correct as of 14 December 2025
International career
Years	Team	Apps	(Points)
2024–	France	1	(0)
- Correct as of 14 December 2025

Romain Briatte (born 18 February 1993) is a French rugby union player, who plays for the Stade Français. His preferred position is flanker.

== Early career ==
Briatte began playing rugby aged 5 in his hometown of Riom. He originally played as a fly-half before converting to backrow. He was a member of Clermont's academy from 2006 up until Espoirs level.

== Professional career ==
Briatte signed his first professional contract for Aurillac in 2014. After four seasons, he moved to Agen to compete in the Top 14. After a further three seasons and following Agen's relegation, he transferred again to Stade Français.

Briatte was called into the France side for the 2024 mid-year rugby union tests. After appearing for a French Development side against Uruguay, he made his full debut against Argentina the following week.
