= Renger van Eerten =

US international rugby union player

- Full name: Renger van Eerten
- Born: 2 August 1999 (age 27) Netherlands
- Height: 203 cm (6 ft 8 in)
- Weight: 104 kg (229 lb; 16 st 5 lb)

Rugby union career
- Position: Lock
- Current team: CA Brive
Youth career
- 2011-2017: Haagsche Rugby Club
- 20??-20??: Rugby Academy Zuid-West
- 2019-2021: CA Brive
Senior career
Years	Team	Apps	(Points)
2017-2019	Haagsche Rugby Club		
2020-2025	CA Brive	36	(5)
2025-	Provence Rugby	0	(0)
- Correct as of 17 July 2024
International career
Years	Team	Apps	(Points)
2019	Netherlands under-20		
2024-	United States	1	(0)
- Correct as of 17 July 2024

Renger van Eerten (born 2 August 1999) is a Dutch born American rugby union player. He plays at CA Brive in the Pro D2 in France.

== Career ==
=== Youth ===
He began playing rugby at 6 years old while living in England before giving it up not long after, going on to play Ice Hockey when his family moved to Canada. When he moved back to the Netherlands he joined the juniors of Haagsche Rugby Club. Going on to win several youth titles, and joining the Rugby Academy Zuid-West. In 2017, he finished his high school and moved to Amsterdam to follow his studies. He joined the Nationaal Training Centrum while playing with the Haagsche Rugby Club senior side.

=== Brive ===
He joined CA Brive in 2019, after being spotted by Goderzi Shvelidze while playing for the Netherlands under-20 side. His first season at the club included him playing for the espoirs and rugby sevens side. He made his senior debut for the club in 2020, starting in a 16–18. loss against Zebre Parma in the EPCR Challenge Cup. In 2021 he signed his first professional contract, signing until 2025.

=== USA ===
Van Eerten was named in the 30-man USA roster for their two home games during the 2024 mid-year rugby union tests. He made his debut starting in the second-row against Romania, playing 52 minutes in the 20–22 loss in Chicago.
