= Ignacio Álvarez =

Mexican swimmer (born 1957)

Personal information
- Born: April 11, 1957 (age 69)

Sport
- Sport: Swimming
Medal record
Representing Mexico
Central American and Caribbean Games
Gold medal – first place	1974 Santo Domingo	4x100m medley relay

Ignacio Álvarez Pérez (born 11 April 1957) is a Mexican swimmer who competed in the 1976 Summer Olympics.
