= Alexsandre Kuntelia =

Alexandre Kuntelia
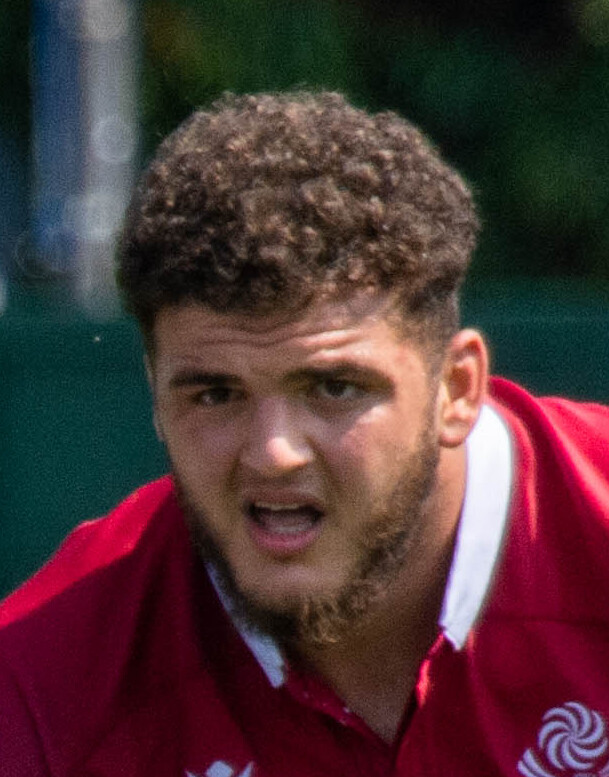
- Born: Alexandre Kuntelia; 26 June 2002 (age 24) Georgia
- Height: 6 ft 6 in (198 cm)
- Weight: 21 st 4 lb (135 kg)

Rugby union career
- Position: Tighthead
- Current team: La Rochelle
Senior career
Years	Team	Apps	(Points)
2020-2021	Lelo Saracens	2	(0)
2021-	La Rochelle	7	(0)
International career
Years	Team	Apps	(Points)
2021	Georgia u18	4	
2022	Georgia u20	4	(10)
2022–	Georgia	2	(5)
- Correct as of 5th March 2023

Alexsandre Kuntelia is a rugby union tighthead prop, who plays for La Rochelle and Lelos internationally.

== Career ==
Kuntelia made two starts for Didi 10 side Lelo Saracens before being signed for French Top14 giants La Rochelle. He made his debut coming off the bench against Pau in the 21–38 loss.

== International career ==
He was selected for the Georgian u20 squad that took part in the Six Nations U20 Summer Series, scoring in Georgia's victory over Scotland U20. He made 4 appearances in total, including 3 starts scoring a total of 2 tries.

Kuntelia made his full international debut coming off the bench against Samoa, scoring in the 68th minute. He also came off the bench in the historic victory over Wales.

=== International tries ===
Try	Opposing team	Location	Venue	Competition	Date	Result	Score
1	Samoa	Tbilisi, Georgia	Dinamo Arena	Test Match	12 November 2022	Loss	19 - 20
