= Yoshitaka Yazaki =

Japan international rugby union player

Yoshitaka Yazaki 矢崎由高
- Full name: Yoshitaka Yazaki
- Born: 12 May 2004 (age 22) Japan
- Height: 180 cm (5 ft 11 in)
- Weight: 85 kg (187 lb; 13 st 5 lb)
- School: Toin Gakuen High School
- University: Waseda University

Rugby union career
- Position(s): Fullback, Wing, Fly-half
- Current team: Waseda University
Amateur team(s)
Years	Team	Apps	(Points)
2023-2027	Waseda University		
- Correct as of 13 July 2024
International career
Years	Team	Apps	(Points)
2023	Japan under-19	2	(5)
2023	Japan under-20	6	(5)
2023-	Japan XV	5	(20)
2024-	Japan	11	(5)
- Correct as of 13 July 2024

Yoshitaka Yazaki (矢崎 由高, Yazaki Yoshitaka; born 12 May 2004) is a Japanese rugby union player. He plays for Waseda University and for the Japan national team. due to his amazing skillset he start playing in the national team even before have a professional contract.

== Career ==
=== Club ===
He plays for Waseda University playing in the Japan University Rugby Championship.

=== International ===
He was named in the Japan under-19 squad for their tour of Ireland going on to score in the first test against Ireland under-19. He went on to be called up to the Japan under-20 squad, making his debut against New Zealand Universities. He went on to start in all of Japan under-20s games in the 2023 World Rugby U20 Championship.

He featured in all of Japan XV games in the World Rugby Pacific Challenge, scoring a try against Manuma Samoa and Tonga A, going to score a brace against the Fiji Warriors. He played against the Māori All Blacks twice in 2024, starting at fullback in both matches he scored a penalty in the second match. His impressive performances led him to being called up to the senior Japan squad by Eddie Jones.

He made his debut for the senior Japan side in their first match of 2024, starting at fullback in a 17–52 loss against England.

== Honors ==
=== Japan XV ===
- World Rugby Pacific Challenge
  - Champions: (1) 2024
