= Peniasi Dakuwaqa =

- Born: 9 April 1997 (age 29)
- Height: 186 cm (6 ft 1 in)
- Weight: 92 kg (203 lb)

Rugby union career
- Position: Wing
Senior career
Years	Team	Apps	(Points)
2022–	Stade Français	47	(95)
International career
Years	Team	Apps	(Points)
2024–	Fiji	1	(10)

Peniasi Dakuwaqa (born 9 April 1997) is a Fijian international rugby union player. He lived in the Cook Islands for a few years where he played rugby league and competed in athletics and broke the Cook Islands 100 metres record of 10.97s which was held by Mark Sherwin since 1993, when he ran 10.42s during the Cook Islands Games in 2020.

== Rugby career ==
A winger, Dakuwaqa is known as "the Flash" for his explosive pace and has played his rugby with French club Stade Français since 2022. He scored a memorable solo try against Racing 92 during the 2023–24 Top 14 season when he took the ball from his own dead-ball area, regathered a chip kick, and ran the length of the field to score.

Dakuwaqa earned his first international call up in 2024, as one of five Fiji debutants for a match against Georgia at Adjarabet Arena in Batumi, starting on the left wing. He scored two tries in a 21–12 Fiji win.

== See also ==
- List of Fiji national rugby union players
