= Luka Goginava =

- Born: October 4, 1996 (age 30) Tbilisi, Georgia
- Height: 1.84 m (6 ft 1/2 in)
- Weight: 115 kg (18 st 2 lb; 254 lb)

Rugby union career
- Position(s): Loosehead Prop, Hooker
Senior career
Years	Team	Apps	(Points)
2017-2018	Racing 92	3	(0)
2018-2019	Brive (Loan)	11	(5)
2019-2021	Soyaux-Angoulême	48	(15)
2021-2024	Football Club de Grenoble Rugby	60	(20)
2024-	Stade Montois	46	(20)
- Correct as of 17 January 2019
International career
Years	Team	Apps	(Points)
2015-2016	Georgia U20	10	(5)
2023-	Georgia	8	(0)
- Correct as of 17 August 2016

Luka Goginava (Georgian: ლუკა გოგინავა) is a Georgian rugby union player. He plays as Loosehead Prop for Racing 92 in Top 14.
