= Ignacio Ruiz =

Argentine rower (born 1948)

Personal information
- Nationality: Argentine
- Born: 15 March 1948 (age 77)

Sport
- Sport: Rowing

Ignacio Ruiz (born 15 March 1948) is an Argentine rower. He competed at the 1972 Summer Olympics and the 1976 Summer Olympics.
