= Ewan Johnson =

Scottish rugby union player (born 1999)

- Born: 27 June 1999 (age 27) Cheshire, England
- Height: 6 ft 8 in (2.03 m)
- Weight: 120 kg (260 lb; 18 st 13 lb)

Rugby union career
- Position: Lock
Amateur team(s)
Years	Team	Apps	(Points)
2012 - 2017	Plouzané		
Senior career
Years	Team	Apps	(Points)
2017–20	Racing 92	1	(0)
2020–23	RC Vannes	52	(5)
2023–25	Oyonnax	32	(5)
2025–	Bayonne	23	(0)
- Correct as of 27 January 2025
International career
Years	Team	Apps	(Points)
2018–19	Scotland U20	10	
2024–	Scotland	5	(0)
2024–	Scotland A	1	(0)
- Correct as of 27 January 2025

Ewan Johnson (born 27 June 1999) is a Scotland international rugby union player who plays for French club Bayonne at Lock.

== Rugby Union career ==
=== Amateur career ===
Johnson went to the Parisian secondary school Fac d'Orsay. He played with Plouzané in France from 2012 to 2017.

=== Professional career ===
Johnson was in the academy setup for Racing 92 between 2017 and 2020. He made his competitive debut for them in 2019.

Johnson moved to play for RC Vannes from 2020 to 2023. He then moved to play for Oyonnax in 2023.

=== International career ===
In June 2024 Johnson was called up to the senior Scotland squad for a tour of The Americas. He made his Scotland debut against Canada on 6 July 2024 at TD Place Stadium in Ottawa. Scotland won the match 73 points to 12. Johnson has the Scotland no. 1227.

In January 2025, he was called up to the Scotland senior training squad for the 2025 Six Nations.

== Personal life ==
Johnson was eligible for 4 different international countries. He was born in England, with a Welsh mother and Scottish father. His parents retired to France and Johnson was a French resident. However Johnson explained it was not really a choice. "But for me, it’s always been about Scottish rugby, because my old man is the one who always drove the rugby into us. He’s rugby-mad, so I didn’t have a choice, to be honest."
