= 2023 Super Rugby Americas season =

Fourth season of Super Rugby Americas

2023 Super Rugby Americas
- Countries: Argentina; Brazil; Chile; Paraguay; Uruguay; United States
- Date: 17 February – 9 June 2023
- Champions: (Uruguay) Peñarol (2nd title)
- Runners-up: (Argentina) Dogos
- Matches played: 45
- Tries scored: 306 (average 6.8 per match)

Official website
- www.superrugbyamericas.com

The 2023 Super Rugby Americas season is the fourth season of the Super Rugby Americas, an annual rugby union competition mainly for South American rugby clubs, although the first to be held under the Super Rugby Americas name. The regular season will begin on 17 February 2023.

== Format ==
The seven clubs in the competition compete in the regular season, which takes place over 14 rounds and consists of a double round-robin, with each participating club playing two matches against each of the other six clubs. The top 4 clubs at the end of the regular season move on to the knockout stage where the clubs then play in a knockout tournament, consisting of semi-finals and eventually, the final.

== Teams ==
A number of changes to teams competing in this competition happened for this edition. First, two clubs withdrew from the competition entirely: Argentine-based Jaguares XV and Colombian-based Cafeteros Pro. Both leave the competition after joining in the 2021 edition.

Three teams have entered the competition for this season. First is Dogos XV, an Argentine-based club. They return to the competition they left after the 2020 edition, competing as Ceibos at that time. Second is another Argentine-based club, Pampas XV, who are competing in the competition for the first time this year. The third club joining the competition is the American-based American Raptors, who are also competing in this competition for the first time this year. Previously, the Raptors competed as the Colorado Raptors in Major League Rugby, withdrawing from that competition after the 2020 season.

Finally, the Paraguayan-based Olimpia Lions have been renamed Yacare XV following the end of a sponsorship agreement between Olimpia and Paraguayan Rugby.

Location of teams of the 2023 Super Rugby Americas.

Team	City	Stadium	Capacity	Coach	Captain
(Argentina) Dogos	Córdoba	Tala Rugby Club	6,000	(Argentina) Nicolás Galatro	TBA
(Argentina) Pampas	Buenos Aires	CASI	5,000	(Argentina) Ignacio Fernández Lobbe	TBA
(Brazil) Cobras	São Paulo	Estádio Nicolau Alayon	9,660	(Brazil) Josh Reeves	(Brazil) Gabriel Paganini
(Chile) Selknam	Santiago	Estadio Municipal de La Pintana	5,000	(Argentina) Nicolás Bruzzone	(Chile) Ignacio Silva
(Paraguay) Yacare	Asunción	Estadio Héroes de Curupayty	3,000	(Argentina) Ricardo Le Fort	TBA
(Uruguay) Peñarol	Montevideo	Estadio Charrúa	14,000	(Argentina) Pablo Bouza	TBA
(United States) Raptors	Glendale, CO	Infinity Park	5,000	(United States) Sarah Chobot	TBA

== Regular season ==
The regular season begins on 17 February and ends on 27 May.

=== Standings ===
Standings at the conclusion of the 2023 Super Rugby Americas Season:

Key
Advances to the semi-finals

Pos.	Team	Season matches				Points			Tries		TBP	LBP	Table points
Pos.	Team	P	W	D	L	PF	PA	Diff.	TF	TA	TBP	LBP	Table points
1	Peñarol (CH)	12	10	0	2	406	225	+181	57	27	9	2	51
2	Dogos (RU)	12	9	0	3	368	303	+65	47	39	9	1	46
3	Pampas	12	8	0	4	331	229	+102	38	31	3	2	37
4	Yacare	12	7	0	5	305	308	–3	42	37	5	2	35
5	Selknam	12	4	0	8	264	272	–8	35	31	4	3	23
6	Raptors	12	2	0	10	282	458	–176	38	64	6	2	16
7	Cobras	12	2	0	10	268	429	–161	35	63	3	2	13

=== Matches ===
The following are the match results for the 2023 Super Rugby Americas regular season:

Home \ Away	COB	DOG	PAM	PEN	RAP	SEL	YAC
(Brazil) Cobras		14–31	21–41	15–38	34–38	30–24	14–34
(Argentina) Dogos	45–29		34–29	35–41	40–32	24–10	30–24
(Argentina) Pampas	38–14	11–29		20–19	27–16	19–23	25–24
(Uruguay) Peñarol	33–7	33–15	10–16		28–19	31–8	45–12
(United States) Raptors	40–43	24–37	0–63	37–50		26–22	37–44
(Chile) Selknam	33–17	11–19	34–20	24–35	45–10		19–20
(Paraguay) Yacare	34–30	45–29	5–22	17–43	25–3	21–11	

Updated to match(es) played on unknown. Source:
Legend: Blue = home team win; Yellow = draw; Red = away team win.

=== Round 1 ===
17 February 2023	Dogos (Argentina)	30 – 24	(Paraguay) Yacare (1 BP)	Tala Rugby Club
19:00 ART	Try: Octavio Filippa 12'; Boris Wenger 39'; Valentín Soler 60'; Con: Valentino Di Capua (3) 13', 40', 61'; Pen: Valentino Di Capua (2) 27', 48'; Julián Hernández 80'; Cards: Boris Wenger (yellow card) 54'	Report	Try: Tomás MacCall 5'; Mariano Garcete 33'; Ignacio Inchauspe 68'; Pen: Estanislao Gómez (2) 9', 20'; Federico Cacciabúe 55'; Cards: Marcos Riquelme (yellow card) 36'; Ignacio Inchauspe (yellow card) 38'; Ignacio Martínez (yellow card) 71'	Referee: Damián Schneider (UAR) Assistants: Cauã Ricardo (CBRu) & Juan Pablo Chumbita (UAR) TMO: Martín González Deibe (UAR)

18 February 2023	(1 BP) Selknam (Chile)	45 – 10	(United States) Raptors	Estadio Municipal de La Pintana
18:00 CLST	Try: Matías Garafulic 7'; Joaquín Milesi (3) 24', 33', 80'; Raimundo Martínez 54'; Nicolás Garafulic 57'; Diego Escobar 65'; Con: Santiago Videla (5) 7', 34', 55', 66', 80'	Report	Try: Franco Palillo 74'; Con: Line Latu 75'; Pen: Lucas González Amorosino 17'; Cards: Ramiro Moyano (yellow card) 43'; Seimou Smith (yellow card) 61'	Referee: Gonzalo de Achával (UAR) Assistants: Juan Manuel Martínez (UAR) & Sebastián Toledo (FRC) TMO: Ignacio Calle (FRC)

19 February 2023	Cobras (Brazil)	21 – 41	(Argentina) Pampas (1 BP)	Estádio Nicolau Alayon
15:00 BRT	Try: Penalty try 15'; Endy Willian 23'; André Arruda 51'; Con: Lucas Tranquez (2/2) 24', 51'; Cards: Lucio Anconetoni (yellow card) 27'; Adrio de Melo (red card) 32'; Robert Tenório (red card) 55'; Lucas Spago (yellow card) 57'	Report	Try: Iñaki Delguy 6'; Joaquín de la Vega Mendía 10'; Jerónimo Ulloa 32'; Ramiro Gurovich 37'; Juan Ignacio Landó 56'; Santiago Ruiz 69'; Con: Juan Ignacio Landó (4/6) 7', 10', 33', 37'; Pen: Juan Ignacio Landó (1/2) 28'; Cards: Javier Coronel (yellow card) 15'; Martín Villar (yellow card) 76'; Rodrigo Boulan (yellow card) 78'	Referee: Nehuén Jauri Rivero (UAR) Assistants: Lucas Saccomano (CBRu) & Simón Larrubia (UAR) TMO: Marcelo Pilara (UAR)

Bye/s: Peñarol

=== Round 2 ===
24 February 2023	Peñarol (Uruguay)	28 – 19	(United States) Raptors	Estadio Charrúa
20:00 UYT	Try: Ignacio Dotti 20'; Matías Benítez 47'; Manuel Diana 78'; Con: Felipe Etcheverry (2/3) 21', 79'; Pen: Felipe Etcheverry (3/5) 16', 40', 69'; Cards: Juan Zuccarino (yellow card) 80'	Report	Try: Seimou Smith 11'; Watson Filikitonga 80'; Con: Line Latu (0/1); Lucas González Amorosino (0/1); Pen: Line Latu (1/2) 29'; Lucas González Amorosino (2/3) 56', 65'; Cards: Diego Magno (yellow card) 69'; Diego Fortuny (yellow card) 76'	Referee: Nehuén Jauri Rivero (UAR) Assistants: Claudio Cattivelli (URU) & Simón Larrubia (UAR) TMO: Francisco Pesce (URU)

25 February 2023	(1 BP) Selknam (Chile)	34 – 20	(Argentina) Pampas	Estadio Municipal de La Pintana
18:00 CLST	Try: Rodrigo Fernández 20'; Clemente Saavedra 27'; Nicolás Garafulic 58'; Penalty try 63'; Matías Garafulic 74'; Con: Santiago Videla (1/1) 21'; Francisco Urroz (1/4) 27'; Pen: Francisco Urroz (1/1) 34'; Cards: Francisco Urroz (yellow card) 12'; Ignacio Silva (yellow card) 42'; Clemente Saavedra (yellow card) 49'	Report	Try: Santiago Ruiz 44'; Benjamín Elizalde (2) 69', 70'; Con: Juan Ignacio Landó (1/3) 45'; Pen: Juan Ignacio Landó (1/3) 7'; Cards: Javier Coronel (yellow card) 63'	Referee: Damian Schneider (UAR) Assistants: Juan Manuel López (UAR) & Felipe Balbontín (FRC) TMO: Ignacio Calle (FRC)

26 February 2023	Cobras (Brazil)	14 – 31	(Argentina) Dogos (1 BP)	Estádio Nicolau Alayon
15:00 BRT	Try: Henrique Ferreira 40'; Donnacha Byrne 73'; Con: Lucas Tranquez (2/2) 40', 74'; Pen: Lucas Tranquez (0/1); Drop: Lucas Tranquez (0/1); Cards: Lucio Anconetoni (red card) 45'; Gabriel Paganini (yellow card) 58'	Report	Try: Penalty try (2) 58', 79'; Efraín Elías 65'; Agustín Moyano 69'; Con: Julián Hernández (2/2) 65', 70'; Pen: Julián Hernández (1/2) 33'; Cards: Mateo Núñez (yellow card) 72'	Referee: Frank Méndez (FRC) Assistants: Guilherme Zaparoli (CBRu) & Gonzalo Ventoso (URU) TMO: Alejandro Longres (URU)

Bye/s: Yacare

=== Round 3 ===
3 March 2023	Pampas (Argentina)	27 – 16	(United States) Raptors	CASI
20:00 ART	Try: Benjamín Elizalde 30'; Joaquín de la Vega Mendía 59'; Ramiro Gurovich 65'; Con: Joaquín de la Vega Mendía (3/3) 30', 60', 67'; Pen: Joaquín de la Vega Mendía (2/2) 20', 39'; Cards: Nicolás D’Amorim (yellow card) 3'	Report	Try: Penalty try 3'; Pen: Lucas González Amorosino (3/3) 15', 23', 45'; Cards: Mikey Grandy (yellow card) 37'; Tommy Clark (yellow card) 48'	Referee: Matías Esteban (URU) Assistants: Juan Maio (UAR) & Nicolás Cotic (UAR) TMO: Martín González Deibe (UAR)

4 March 2023	(2 BP) Dogos (Argentina)	35 – 41	(Uruguay) Peñarol (1 BP)	Tala Rugby Club
19:00 ART	Try: Ernesto Giudice 20'; Julián Hernánde 46'; Román Pretz 49'; Agustín Moyano 51'; Con: Julián Hernández (3) 46', 50', 52'; Pen: Julián Hernández (3) 13', 26', 80'; Cards: Gregorio Hernández (yellow card) 67'; Boris Wenger (yellow card) 68'	Report	Try: Santiago Álvarez 2'; Juan Manuel Alonso (2) 8', 38'; Manuel Diana (2) 31', 67'; Manuel Ardao 70'; Con: Felipe Etcheverry (4) 3', 32', 68', 72'; Pen: Felipe Etcheverry 54'; Cards: Lucas Bianchi (yellow card) 26'; Guillermo Pujadas (yellow card) 51'; Tomás Inciarte (yellow card) 73'	Referee: Tomás Bertazza (UAR) Assistants: Luca Solda (UAR) & Juan Manuel López (UAR) TMO: Marcelo Pilara (UAR)

5 March 2023	Cobras (Brazil)	14 – 34	(Paraguay) Yacare (1 BP)	Estádio Nicolau Alayon
15:00 BRT	Try: Matheus Cláudio; Alain Altahona; Con: Lucas Tranquez (2/2); Pen: Lucas Tranquez (0/1); Cards: Endy Willian (yellow card); Donnacha Byrne (yellow card)	Report	Try: Estéfano Aranda; Emilio Gorostiaga; Ramiro Amarilla (2); Federico Gauna; Con: Estanislao Gómez (1/3); Federico Cacciabúe (2/2); Pen: Estanislao Gómez (1); Cards: Sebastián Urbieta (yellow card)	Referee: Nehuén Jauri Rivero (UAR) Assistants: Mauro Rossi (UAR) & Víctor Barboza (CBRu) TMO: Lucas Galán (UAR)

Bye/s: Selknam

=== Round 4 ===
10 March 2023	(1 BP) Dogos (Argentina)	24 – 10	(Chile) Selknam	Tala Rugby Club
19:00 ART	Try: Boris Wenger 4'; Ernesto Giudice 37'; Mateo Soler 46'; Román Pretz 74'; Con: Julián Hernández (2/4) 5', 75'; Pen: Juan Baronio (0/1); Cards: Manuel Todaro (yellow card) 49'; Santiago Pulella (yellow card) 51'	Report	Try: Raimundo Martínez 54'; Con: Matías Garafulic (1/1) 55'; Pen: Matías Garafulic (1/1) 24'	Referee: Pablo Deluca (UAR) Assistants: Federico Longobardi (UAR) & Juan Pablo Chumbita (UAR) TMO: Lucas Galán (UAR)

10 March 2023	(1 BP) Peñarol (Uruguay)	33 – 7	(Brazil) Cobras	Estadio Charrúa
21:00 UYT	Try: Penalty try (2) 16', 24'; Guillermo Storace 17'; Manuel Diana 29'; Manuel Ardao 43'; Con: Juan Zuccarino (2/3) 30', 46'	Report	Try: Lucas Spago 75'; Con: Lucas Spago (1/1); Cards: Ariel Rodrigues (yellow card) 16'; Levy Marinho (yellow card) 24'; Robson Moraes (yellow card) 38'; Ben Donald (yellow card) 42'	Referee: Francisco González (URU) Assistants: Nicolás Cotic (UAR) & Claudio Cativelli (UAR) TMO: Francisco Pesce (URU)

11 March 2023	Yacare (Paraguay)	25 – 3	(United States) Raptors	Estadio Héroes de Curupayty
20:00 PYST	Try: Ignacio Inchauspe 28'; Marcos Riquelme 66'; Felipe Puertas 80'; Con: Federico Cacciabúe (1/1) 29'; Ignacio Inchauspe (1/1) 67'; Ramiro Amarilla (0/1); Pen: Federico Cacciabúe (2/3) 24', 40'	Report	Pen: Lucas González Amorosino (1/1) 21'; Cards: Ryan James (yellow card) 36'; Ronan Murphy (yellow card) 47'; Seimou Smith (yellow card) 65'	Referee: Gonzalo de Achával (UAR) Assistants: Federico Solari (UAR) & César Torres (UAR) TMO: Alejandro Longres (URU)

Bye/s: Pampas

=== Round 5 ===
16 March 2023	Pampas (Argentina)	11 – 29	(Argentina) Dogos (1 BP)	CASI
20:00 ART	Try: Benjamín Elizalde 35'; Con: Joaquín de la Vega Mendía (0/1); Pen: Joaquín de la Vega Mendía (2/2) 33', 42'; Cards: Jerónimo Ureta (yellow card) 39'	Report	Try: Mateo Soler 3'; Juan Baronio 39'; Leonardo Gea Salim 52'; Ramiro Valdés Iribarren 75'; Con: Juan Baronio (2/3) 40', 53'; Valentino Di Capua (1/1) 76'; Pen: Juan Baronio (1/1) 10'; Cards: Santiago Pulella (yellow card) 31' (yellow-red card) 41'	Referee: Francisco González (URU) Assistants: Pablo Deluca (UAR) & Federico González (URU) TMO: Marcelo Pilara (UAR)

17 March 2023	(1 BP) Peñarol (Uruguay)	45 – 12	(Paraguay) Yacare	Estadio Charrúa
18:30 UYT	Try: Manuel Diana 10'; Tomás Inciarte (2) 12', 79'; Lucas Bianchi 18'; Santiago Álvarez 40'; Felipe Etcheverry 42'; Con: Felipe Etcheverry (6/6) 11', 13', 19', 40', 43', 80'; Pen: Felipe Etcheverry (1/1) 71'	Report	Try: Estanislao Gómez 2'; Mariano Garcete 75'; Con: Estanislao Gómez (1/2) 76'	Referee: Nehuén Jauri Rivero (UAR) Assistants: Luca Solda (UAR) & Gonzalo Ventoso (URU) TMO: Alejandro Longres (URU)

18 March 2023	Cobras (Brazil)	30 – 24	(Chile) Selknam (1 BP)	Estádio Nicolau Alayon
16:00 BRT	Try: Robert Tenório 4'; Ariel Rodrigues (2) 37', 64'; Con: Lucas Tranquez (3/3) 5', 40', 65'; Pen: Lucas Tranquez (3/3) 10', 38', 80'; Cards: Cléber Dias (yellow card) 54'	Report	Try: Javier Eissmann 31'; Santiago Edwards 47'; Luca Strabucchi 76'; Con: Francisco Urroz (3/3) 32', 48', 77'; Pen: Francisco Urroz (1/1) 15'; Cards: Ignacio Silva (yellow card) 63'	Referee: Tomás Bertazza (UAR) Assistants: Gonzalo de Achával (UAR) & Lucas Saccommano (CBRu) TMO: Víctor Hugo Barboza (CBRu)

Bye/s: Raptors

=== Round 6 ===
24 March 2023	Yacare (Paraguay)	5 – 22	(Argentina) Pampas	Estadio Héroes de Curupayty
18:00 PYT	Try: Facundo Pomponio 38'; Con: Federico Cacciabúe (0/1); Pen: Federico Cacciabúe (0/1)	Report	Try: Iñaki Delguy 3'; Santiago Ruiz 6'; Manuel Alfaro 28'; Con: Joaquín de la Vega Mendía (2/3) 6', 30'; Pen: Joaquín de la Vega Mendía (1/1) 15'; Cards: Joaquín de la Vega Mendía (yellow card) 58'	Referee: Marquise Goodwin (USAR) Assistants: Federico Solario (UAR) & José Ibañez (UAR) TMO: Víctor Silvero (CBRu)

24 March 2023	Selknam (Chile)	24 – 35	(Uruguay) Peñarol (1 BP)	Estadio Municipal de La Pintana
20:00 CLST	Try: Santiago Pedrero 8'; Matías Garafulic 19'; Con: Matías Garafulic (1/2) 9'; Pen: Matías Garafulic (4/4) 5', 23', 45', 53'; Cards: Lucas Bordigoni (yellow card) 40'; Javier Carrasco (yellow card) 68'	Report	Try: Santiago Álvarez 2'; Manuel Diana 16'; Carlos Deus 59'; Penalty try 69'; Tomás Inciarte 80'; Con: Felipe Etcheverry (4/4) 3', 17', 60', 80'; Cards: Agustín Morales (yellow card) 38'; Felipe Etcheverry (yellow card) 40'; Carlos Deus (yellow card) 46'	Referee: Pablo Deluca (UAR) Assistants: Luca Solda (UAR) & Raimundo Fuenzalida (FRC) TMO: Ignacio Calle (FRC)

24 March 2023	(1 BP) Raptors (United States)	24 – 37	(Argentina) Dogos (1 BP)	Infinity Park
19:00 MDT	Try: Payton Telea-Ilalio 30'; Tommy Clark 40'; Diego Fortuny 50'; Diego Magno 55'; Con: Lucas González Amorosino (2/3) 31', 40'; Cards: Diego Fortuny (yellow card) 11'	Report	Try: Boris Wenger (2) 12', 17'; Juan Baronio 21'; Leonardo Gea Salim 45'; Con: Juan Baronio (4/4) 13', 18', 22', 46'; Pen: Juan Baronio (1/1) 8'; Felipe Mallía (2/2) 61', 70'; Cards: Octavio Filippa (yellow card) 25'; Julián Hernández (yellow card) 39'	Referee: Juan Manuel León (FCR) Assistants: Felipe Nogués (UAR) & Joe Burpoe (USAR) TMO: Marc Nelson (USAR)

Bye/s: Cobras

=== Round 7 ===
29 March 2023	Pampas (Argentina)	20 – 19	(Uruguay) Peñarol (1 BP)	CASI
20:00 ART	Try: Nicolás D’Amorim 9'; Jerónimo Ureta 78'; Con: Joaquín de la Vega Mendía (2/2) 10', 78'; Pen: Joaquín de la Vega Mendía (2/4) 43', 67'; Cards: Matías Medrano (yellow card) 54'	Report	Try: Carlos Deus 38'; Tomás Inciarte 46'; Penalty try 54'; Con: Felipe Etcheverry (1/2) 47'; Pen: Felipe Etcheverry (0/1); Cards: Guillermo Pujadas (yellow card) 7'; Juan Zuccarino (yellow card) 71'	Referee: Tomás Bertazza (UAR) Assistants: Pablo Deluca (UAR) & Juan Maio (UAR) TMO: Marcelo Pilara (UAR)

1 April 2023	Yacare (Paraguay)	21 – 11	(Chile) Selknam	Estadio Héroes de Curupayty
19:00 PYT	Try: Ramiro Amarilla 4'; Facundo Pomponio 15'; Con: Ignacio Inchauspe (1/2) 16'; Pen: Ignacio Inchauspe (3/3) 40', 47', 79'	Report	Try: Rodrigo Fernández 45'; Con: Santiago Videla (0/1); Pen: Santiago Videla (2/2) 11', 63'; Cards: Clemente Saavedra (yellow card) 14'	Referee: Francisco González (URU) Assistants: Marquise Goodwin (USAR) & Adrián Bogado (URP) TMO: Víctor Silvero (URP)

2 April 2023	(2 BP) Raptors (United States)	40 – 43	(Brazil) Cobras (1 BP)	Infinity Park
17:00 MDT	Try: Watson Filikitonga 8'; Diego Fortuny 19'; Tommy Clark 52'; Line Latu 54'; Ma'ake Muti 69'; Mikey Grandy 79'; Con: Lucas González Amorosino (5/6) 20', 53', 55', 70', 79'	Report	Try: Endy Willian (2) 4', 24'; Lucas Tranquez 27'; Ariel Rodrigues 36'; André Arruda 60'; Nicolás Cantarutti 66'; Con: Lucas Tranquez (5/6) 5', 28', 37', 61', 67'; Pen: Lucas Tranquez (1/1) 75'	Referee: Damian Schneider (UAR) Assistants: Michael Lawrenson (USAR) & Juan Manuel León (FCR) TMO: Amanda Cox (USAR)

Bye/s: Dogos

=== Round 8 ===
14 April 2023	(1 BP) Dogos (Argentina)	45 – 29	(Brazil) Cobras (1 BP)	Tala Rugby Club
19:00 ART	Try: Mateo Soler (3) 12', 52', 57'; Agustín Moyano 19'; Leonardo Gea Salim 44'; Efraín Elías 77'; Franco Giudice 80'; Con: Julián Hernández (5/7) 13', 20', 44', 78', 80'; Cards: Mateo Soler (yellow card) 73'	Report	Try: Ariel Rodrigues 5'; Ben Donald 34'; Donnacha Byrne (2) 40', 74'; Con: Lucas Tranquez (3/4) 34', 40', 74'; Pen: Lucas Tranquez (1/1) 49'; Cards: Ariel Rodrigues (yellow card) 43'; Lucio Anconetoni (yellow card) 55'	Referee: Nehuén Jauri Rivero (UAR) Assistants: Juan Manuel López (UAR) & Federico Longobardi (UAR) TMO: Gustavo Paulín (UAR)

15 April 2023	Yacare (Paraguay)	17 – 43	(Uruguay) Peñarol (1 BP)	Estadio Héroes de Curupayty
20:00 PYT	Try: Mariano Garcete 12'; Penalty try 52'; Con: Ignacio Inchauspe (1/1) 13'; Pen: Ignacio Inchauspe {1/1) 9'; Cards: Ignacio Inchauspe (yellow card) 37'; Rolando Portillo (yellow card) 72'	Report	Try: Santiago Álvarez 15'; Guillermo Pujadas 23'; Manuel Diana 33'; Gastón Mieres 40'; Tomás Inciarte 62'; Rodrigo Silva 79'; Con: Felipe Etcheverry (4/5) 16', 34', 40', 64'; Santiago Del Cerro (1/1) 80'; Pen: Felipe Etcheverry (1/1) 3'; Cards: Tomás Inciarte (yellow card) 48'; Santiago Álvarez (yellow card) 52'	Referee: Tomás Bertazza (UAR) Assistants: Federico Solari (UAR) & Adrián Bogado (URP) TMO: Víctor Silvero (URP)

16 April 2023	Raptors (United States)	0 – 63	(Argentina) Pampas (1 BP)	Infinity Park
15:00 MDT	Cards: Diego Fortuny (yellow card) 57'	Report	Try: Lucio Auad (3) 4', 31', 48'; Santiago Ruiz 14'; Valentino Minoyetti 28'; Nicolás D’Amorim 42'; Rodrigo Boulan 68'; Joaquín Lamas 73'; Iñaki Delguy 78'; Con: Joaquín de la Vega Mendía (9/9) 5', 15', 29', 32', 43', 49', 69', 75', 79'; Cards: Federico Lavanini (yellow card) 54'	Referee: Francisco González (URU) Assistants: Phil Schwan (USAR) & Joe Burpoe (USAR) TMO: Marc Nelson (USAR)

Bye/s: Selknam

=== Round 9 ===
21 April 2023	(1 BP) Peñarol (Uruguay)	33 – 15	(Argentina) Dogos	Estadio Charrúa
20:00 UYT	Try: Manuel Diana (2) 5', 38'; Juan Manuel Alonso 35'; Carlos Deus 61'; Con: Felipe Etcheverry (2/3) 6', 39'; Rodrigo Silva (0/1); Pen: Felipe Etcheverry (3/3) 40', 67', 73'; Cards: Felipe Etcheverry (yellow card) 52'; Carlos Deus (yellow card) 63'; Mateo Sanguinetti (yellow card) 65'; Juan Manuel Rodríguez (yellow card) 79'	Report	Try: Penalty try 65'; Román Pretz 78'; Con: Julián Hernández (0/1); Pen: Julián Hernández (1/3) 14'; Cards: Lautaro Simes (yellow card) 27'; Octavio Barbatti (yellow card) 59'	Referee: Pablo Deluca (UAR) Assistants: Claudio Cattivelli (URU) & Simón Larrubia (UAR) TMO: Alejandro Longes (UAR)

22 April 2023	Raptors (United States)	26 – 22	(Chile) Selknam (2 BP)	Infinity Park
15:00 MDT	Try: Daytwon Sheridan 11'; Shawn Clark 28'; Ethan McVeigh 49'; Con: Lucas González Amorosino (1/3) 29'; Pen: Lucas González Amorosino (3/3) 52', 64', 72'; Cards: Shawn Clark (yellow card) 3'; Juan Echeverría (yellow card) 80'	Report	Try: Diego Escobar 22'; Gaspar Moltedo 55'; Nicolás Herreros 76'; Ignacio Silva 80'; Con: Matías Garafulic (1/4) 58'	Referee: Francisco González (URU) Assistants: Michel Lawrenson (USAR) & Phil Schwan (USAR) TMO: Marc Nelson (USAR)

23 April 2023	(1 BP) Yacare (Paraguay)	34 – 30	(Brazil) Cobras (1 BP)	Estadio Héroes de Curupayty
19:00 PYT	Try: Sebastián Urbieta 8'; Tomás MacCall 14'; Ignacio Inchauspe 46'; Marcos Riquelme 53'; Con: Ignacio Inchauspe (4/4) 8', 14', 47', 54'; Pen: Ignacio Inchauspe (2/2) 30', 68'	Report	Try: Matheus Cláudio 29'; Facundo Vilalba 56'; Alain Altahona 78'; Con: Lucas Tranquez (3/3) 4', 12', 18'; Pen: Lucas Tranquez (3/3) 30', 57', 79'	Referee: Damian Schneider (UAR) Assistants: Adrián Bogado (URP) & Luca Solda (UAR) TMO: Víctor Silvero (URP)

Bye/s: Pampas

=== Round 10 ===
28 April 2023	(1 BP) Pampas (Argentina)	38 – 14	(Brazil) Cobras	CASI
20:00 ART	Try: Nicolás D’Amorim 1'; Iñaki Delguy 8'; Benjamín Elizalde (2) 10', 17'; Joaquín de la Vega Mendía 38'; Rodrigo Boulan 47'; Con: Joaquín de la Vega Mendía (4/6) 2', 10', 18', 48'; Cards: Juan Ignacio Landó (yellow card) 67'; Rodrigo Fernández Criado (yellow card) 68'; Miguel Prince (yellow card) 76'	Report	Try: Levy Marinho 44'; Penalty try 68'; Con: Lucas Tranquez (1/1) 45'	Referee: Gonzalo de Achával (UAR) Assistants: Mauro Rossi (UAR) & Juan Maio (UAR) TMO: Maximiliano Miranda (UAR)

29 April 2023	Selknam (Chile)	11 – 19	(Argentina) Dogos	Estadio Municipal de La Pintana
18:00 CLT	Try: Diego Escobar 71'; Con: Santiago Videla (0/1); Pen: Santiago Videla (1/2) 3'; Francisco Urroz (1/1) 14'; Cards: Santiago Videla (yellow card) 9'	Report	Try: Julián Hernández 16'; Con: Julián Hernández (1/1) 17'; Pen: Julián Hernández (4/4) 7', 9', 34', 80'; Cards: Julián Hernández (yellow card) 49' (yellow-red card) 68'	Referee: Tomás Bertazza (UAR) Assistants: Frank Méndez (FRC) & Matías Esteban (URU) TMO: Ignacio Calle (FRC)

30 April 2023	(1 BP) Raptors (United States)	37 – 50	(Uruguay) Peñarol (1 BP)	Infinity Park
15:00 MDT	Try: Ethan McVeigh 4'; Diego Fortuny 11'; Daytwon Sheridan (3) 31', 67', 77'; Aki Pulu 36'; Con: Lucas González Amorosino (1/5) 37'; Jerome Nale (1/1) 78'; Pen: Lucas González Amorosino (1/1) 29'; Cards: Siaki Vikilani (yellow card) 19'; Aki Pulu (yellow card) 24'; Juan Echeverría (yellow card) 76'	Report	Try: Manuel Diana (3) 19', 40', 42'; Juan Manuel Alonso 24'; Felipe Etcheverry 46'; Emiliano Faccenini 50'; Gastón Mieres 57'; Con: Felipe Etcheverry (5/6) 20', 25', 43', 47', 51'; Juan Zuccarino (1/1) 58'; Pen: Felipe Etcheverry (1/1) 3'; Cards: Manuel Ardao (yellow card) 27'; Reinaldo Piussi (yellow card) 72'	Referee: Nehuén Jauri Rivero (UAR) Assistants: Joe Burpoe (USAR) & Steve Gore (USAR) TMO: Chris O’Malley (USAR)

Bye/s: Yacare

=== Round 11 ===
5 May 2023	(1 BP) Dogos (Argentina)	34 – 29	(Argentina) Pampas (1 BP)	Tala Rugby Club
19:00 ART	Try: Julián Hernández 30'; Ernesto Giudice 37'; Mateo Soler 41'; Lautaro Cipriani 78'; Con: Julián Hernández (3/3) 31', 38', 42'; Juan Baronio (1/1) 79'; Pen: Julián Hernández (2/2) 9', 47'; Cards: Lautaro Simes (yellow card) 50'; Federico Albrisi (yellow card) 64'	Report	Try: Nicolás D’Amorim 50'; Iñaki Delguy 71'; Con: Joaquín de la Vega Mendía (2/2) 51', 72'; Pen: Joaquín de la Vega Mendía (5/5) 19', 25', 27' 55', 77'; Cards: Juan Pablo Castro (yellow card) 31'; Rodrigo Martínez (yellow card) 45'	Referee: Damian Schneider (UAR) Assistants: Simón Larrubia (UAR) & Juan Manuel López (UAR) TMO: Marcelo Pilara (UAR)

6 May 2023	(1 BP) Selknam (Chile)	33 – 17	(Brazil) Cobras	Estadio Municipal de La Pintana
17:00 CLT	Try: Clemente Saavedra 4'; Joaquín Milesi 21'; Penalty try 36'; Augusto Böhme 52'; Vittorio Lastra 71'; Con: Francisco Urroz (3/4) 5', 22', 72'	Report	Try: Endy Willian 31'; Henrique Ferreira 58'; Con: Lucas Tranquez (2/2) 32', 59'; Pen: Lucas Tranquez (1/2) 9'; Cards: Cléber Dias (yellow card) 36'; Endy Willian (yellow card) 68'	Referee: Gonzalo de Achával (UAR) Assistants: Juan Manuel Martínez (UAR) & Raimundo Fuenzalida (FRC) TMO: Ignacio Calle (FRC)

7 May 2023	(2 BP) Raptors (United States)	37 – 44	(Paraguay) Yacare (1 BP)	Infinity Park
17:00 MDT	Try: Shawn Clark 1'; Watson Filikitonga 7'; Ramiro Moyano 13'; Line Latu 31'; Ryan James 69'; Con: Lucas González Amorosino (3/5) 2', 8', Pen: Lucas González Amorosino (2/2) 51', 76'; Cards: Diego Fortuny (yellow card) 24'	Report	Try: Penalty try 24'; Juan González 28'; Felipe Villagrán 36'; Lucas Noguera Paz 47'; Sebastián Urbieta 56'; Federico Gauna 6'; Julián Martín 79'; Con: Federico Cacciabúe (2/6) 61', 80'; Pen: Federico Cacciabúe (1/1) 7'	Referee: Nehuén Jauri Rivero (UAR) Assistants: Steve Gore (USAR) & Michel Lawrenson (USAR) TMO: Austin Reed (USAR)

Bye/s: Peñarol

=== Round 12 ===
12 May 2023	(1 BP) Pampas (Argentina)	19 – 23	(Chile) Selknam	CASI
20:00 ART	Try: Iñaki Delguy 12'; Con: Joaquín de la Vega Mendía (1/1) 12'; Pen: Joaquín de la Vega Mendía (4/5) 22', 27', 45', 53'; Cards: Eliseo Morales (yellow card) 49'	Report	Try: Clemente Saavedra 28'; Augusto Böhme 36'; Con: Francisco Urroz (2/2) 29', 37'; Pen: Francisco Urroz (1/2) 49'; Santiago Videla (2/2) 58', 78'; Cards: Raimundo Martínez (yellow card) 45'	Referee: Pablo Deluca (UAR) Assistants: Tomás Bertazza (UAR) & Luca Solda (UAR) TMO: Maximiliano Miranda (UAR)

13 May 2023	Cobras (Brazil)	15 – 38	(Uruguay) Peñarol (1 BP)	Estádio Nogueirão
13:00 BRT	Try: Donnacha Byrne 28'; Felipe Gonçalves 76'; Con: Lucas Spago (1/2) 29'; Pen: Lucas Spago (1/1) 5'	Report	Try: Juan Manuel Rodríguez 1'; Emiliano Faccenini 8'; Santiago Álvarez 19'; Gastón Mieres 40'; Rodrigo Silva 51'; Manuel Ardao 65'; Con: Felipe Etcheverry (3/5) 19', 40', 52'; Juan Zuccarino (1/1) 66'; Cards: Santiago Álvarez (yellow card) 68'	Referee: Frank Méndez (FRC) Assistants: Guilherme Zaparoli (CBRu) & Raimundo Fuenzalida (FRC) TMO: Víctor Hugo Barboza (CBRu)

13 May 2023	(1 BP) Yacare (Paraguay)	45 – 29	(Argentina) Dogos (1 BP)	Estadio Héroes de Curupayty
19:00 PYT	Try: Felipe Villagrán (2) 9', 18'; Juan González 31'; Penalty try (2) 34', 58'; Mariano Muntaner 44'; Ignacio Inchauspe 53'; Con: Ignacio Inchauspe (2/3) 19', 32'; Federico Cacciabúe(1/1) 53'; Pen: Sebastián Urbieta (0/1); Cards: Federico Cacciabúe (yellow card) 4'; Lucas Sommer (yellow card) 47'	Report	Try: Ernesto Giudice 37'; Efraín Elías 65'; Lautaro Cipriani 69'; Boris Wenger 74'; Con: Juan Baronio (0/1); Julián Hernández (3/3) 66', 70', 74'; Pen: Juan Baronio (1/1) 13'; Cards: Lautaro Cipriani (yellow card) 7'; Juan Mernes (yellow card) 18'; Tomás Bartolini (yellow card) 49'	Referee: Damian Schneider (UAR) Assistants: Federico Solari (UAR) & Sergio Alvarenga (URP) TMO: Víctor Silvero (URP)

Bye/s: Raptors

=== Round 13 ===
19 May 2023	(1 BP) Peñarol (Uruguay)	10 – 16	(Argentina) Pampas	Estadio Charrúa
20:00 UYT	Try: Manuel Diana 22'; Manuel Ardao 36'; Con: Felipe Etcheverry (0/2); Pen: Felipe Etcheverry (0/2)	Report	Try: Joaquín de la Vega Mendía 6'; Con: Joaquín de la Vega Mendía (1/1) 7'; Pen: Joaquín de la Vega Mendía (3/3) 15', 40', 60'	Referee: Damian Schneider (UAR) Assistants: Matías Esteban (URU) & Cauã Ricardo (CBRu) TMO: Alejandro Longes (UAR)

20 May 2023	(1 BP) Selknam (Chile)	19 – 20	(Paraguay) Yacare	Estadio Municipal de La Pintana
18:00 CLT	Try: Vittorio Lastra 25'; Raimundo Martínez 49'; Clemente Saavedra 72'; Con: Santiago Videla (2/3) 50', 72'; Cards: Iñaki Gurruchaga (yellow card) 62'	Report	Try: Mariano Garcete 5'; Penalty try 40'; Con: Federico Cacciabúe (1/1) 6'; Pen: Federico Cacciabúe (1/3) 69'; Ignacio Inchauspe (1/1) 76'; Cards: Federico Cacciabúe (yellow card) 43'; Mariano Garcete (yellow card) 48'	Referee: Nehuén Jauri Rivero (UAR) Assistants: Gonzalo de Achával (UAR) & Gonzalo Ventoso (URU) TMO: Maximiliano Miranda (UAR)

21 May 2023	(1 BP) Dogos (Argentina)	40 – 32	(United States) Raptors (1 BP)	Tala Rugby Club
19:00 ART	Try: Juan Mernes 2'; Mateo Soler (2) 8', 40'; Faustino Sánchez Valarolo 28'; Boris Wenger 56'; Franco Giudice 58'; Con: Julián Hernández (5/6) 3', 9', 40', 57', 59'	Report	Try: Ronan Murphy 15'; Ramiro Moyano 31'; Watson Filikitonga 70'; Ryan James 80'; Con: Lucas González Amorosino (3/4) 16', 32', 71'; Pen: Lucas González Amorosino (2/2) 37', 45'; Cards: Aki Pulu (yellow card) 7'; Shawn Clark (yellow card) 55'; Mikey Grandy (red card) 75'	Referee: Frank Méndez (FRC) Assistants: Juan Pablo Chumbita (UAR) & Federico Longobardi (UAR) TMO: Gustavo Paulín (UAR)

Bye/s: Cobras

=== Round 14 ===
26 May 2023	Pampas (Argentina)	25 – 24	(Paraguay) Yacare (2 BP)	CASI
15:00 ART	Try: Rodrigo Fernández Criado 80'; Con: Joaquín Lamas (1/1) 80'; Pen: Joaquín Lamas (6/6) 13', 32', 37', 40', 52', 57'	Report	Try: Juan Pérez Rachel (2) 17', 28'; Nicolás Picasso 41'; Tomás Acosta Pimentel 76'; Con: Ignacio Inchauspe (2/4) 18', 42'; Cards: Juan Pérez Rachel (yellow card) 40'; Tomás Acosta Pimentel (yellow card) 56'	Referee: Pablo Deluca (UAR) Assistants: Juan Maio (UAR) & Nehuén Jauri Rivero (UAR) TMO: Marcelo Pilara (UAR)

26 May 2023	(1 BP) Peñarol (Uruguay)	31 – 8	(Chile) Selknam	Estadio Charrúa
19:00 UYT	Try: Tomás Inciarte 26'; Penalty try 33'; Lucas Bianchi 46'; Juan Francisco Torres 60'; Con: Felipe Etcheverry (2/2) 27', 47'; Juan Zuccarino (1/1) 61'; Pen: Felipe Etcheverry (1/1) 4'; Cards: Carlos Deus (yellow card) 65'; Francisco García (yellow card) 76'; Juan Manuel Rodríguez (yellow card) 80'	Report	Try: Pablo Casas 72'; Con: Santiago Videla (0/1); Pen: Santiago Videla (1/1) 30'; Cards: Clemente Saavedra (yellow card) 33' (yellow-red card) 54'	Referee: Tomás Bertazza (UAR) Assistants: Damian Schneider (UAR) & Claudio Cativelli (UAR) TMO: Maximiliano Miranda (UAR)

28 May 2023	(2 BP) Cobras (Brazil)	34 – 38	(United States) Raptors (1 BP)	Estádio Nicolau Alayon
15:00 BRT	Try: Sérgio Luna 10'; Douglas Rauth 22'; Robson Moraes 28'; Matheus Cláudio 35'; Gabriel Oliveira 79'; Con: Lucas Spago (3/5) 11', 23', 29'; Pen: Lucas Spago (1/1) 3'; Cards: Matheus Cláudio (yellow card) 17'; Adrio de Melo (yellow card) 18'	Report	Try: Ryan James 12'; Ronan Murphy 19'; Diego Magno 34'; Payton Telea-Ilalio 38'; Line Latu 57'; Seimou Smith 67'; Con: Lucas González Amorosino (4/5) 12', 35', 39', 68'; Line Latu (0/1)	Referee: Simón Larrubia (UAR) Assistants: Lucas Saccommano (UAR) & Nehuén Jauri Rivero (UAR) TMO: Víctor Hugo Barboza (CBRu)

Bye/s: Dogos

== Knockout stage ==
Semi-finals
2 June – Estadio Charrúa
Peñarol	32
Yacare	17
2 June – Tala Rugby Club
Dogos	27
Pampas	16

Final
9 June – Estadio Charrúa
Peñarol	23
Dogos	17

=== Semi-finals ===
2 June 2023	Peñarol (Uruguay)	32 – 17	(Paraguay) Yacare	Estadio Charrúa
19:30 UYT	Try: Alfonso Silva (2) 22', 29'; Penalty try 33'; Juan Manuel Alonso 80'; Con: Felipe Etcheverry (1/3) 30'; Pen: Felipe Etcheverry (2/2) 14', 63'; Cards: Mateo Sanguinetti (yellow card) 37'	Report	Try: Lucas Sommer 42'; Ignacio Inchauspe 64'; Con: Ignacio Inchauspe (2/2) 43', 65'; Pen: Ignacio Inchauspe (1/1) 12'; Cards: Federico Cacciabúe (yellow card) 33'; Facundo Pomponio (yellow card) 37'	Referee: Damian Schneider (UAR) Assistants: Frank Made (FRC) & Nehuén Jauri Rivero (UAR) TMO: Lucas Galán (UAR)

2 June 2023	Dogos (Argentina)	27 – 16	(Argentina) Pampas	Tala Rugby Club
21:30 ART	Try: Leonardo Gea Salim (2) 18', 68'; Juan Mernes 20'; Con: Julián Hernández (3/3) 19', 21', 69'; Pen: Julián Hernández )1/1) 38'; Juan Baronio (1/1) 76'	Report	Try: Mateo Albanese 31'; Con: Joaquín de la Vega Mendía (1/1) 32'; Pen: Joaquín de la Vega Mendía (1/1) 12'; Drop: Joaquín de la Vega Mendía (2/2) 3', 14'	Referee: Francisco González (URU) Assistants: Tomás Bertazza (UAR) & Federico Solari (UAR) TMO: Francisco Pesce (URU)

=== Final ===
9 June 2023	Peñarol (Uruguay)	23 – 17	(Argentina) Dogos	Estadio Charrúa
19:30 UYT	Try: Ignacio Péculo 17'; Santiago Álvarez; Con: Felipe Etcheverry (2/2) 18', 34'; Pen: Felipe Etcheverry (1/2) 25', 69'; Drop: Felipe Etcheverry (1/1) 55'; Cards: Mateo Sanguinetti (yellow card) 42'; Carlos Deus (yellow card) 68'	Report	Try: Ernesto Giudice 46'; Penalty try 68'; Con: Julián Hernández (1/1) 47'; Pen: Julián Hernández (1/1) 76'	Attendance: 9,000; Referee: Damian Schneider (UAR) Assistants: Francisco González (URU) & Nehuén Jauri Rivero (UAR) TMO: Marcelo Pilara (UAR)
