= 2022 Súper Liga Americana de Rugby season =

2022 Súper Liga Americana de Rugby
- Countries: Argentina; Brazil; Chile; Colombia; Paraguay; Uruguay
- Date: 13 March 2022 – 27 May 2022
- Champions: Peñarol (1st title)
- Runners-up: Selknam
- Matches played: 33
- Tries scored: 197 (average 6 per match)

Official website
- www.slar.rugby

The 2022 Súper Liga Americana de Rugby season was the third season of the Súper Liga Americana de Rugby, an annual rugby union competition sanctioned by Sudamérica Rugby.

== Format ==
The six clubs in the competition competed in the regular season, which took place over 10 rounds and consisted of a double round-robin, with each participating club playing two matches against each of the other five clubs. The top 4 clubs at the end of the regular season moved on to the knockout stage where the clubs then played in a knockout tournament, consisting of semi-finals and eventually, the final.

== Teams ==
Location of teams of the 2022 Superliga Americana de Rugby.

Team	City	Stadium	Capacity	Coach	Captain
(Argentina) Jaguares XV	Buenos Aires	None	N/A	(Argentina) Ignacio Fernández Lobbe	TBA
(Brazil) Cobras	São Paulo	None	N/A	(Brazil) Fernando Portugal	TBA
(Chile) Selknam	Santiago; Valparaíso	Estadio San Carlos de Apoquindo; Estadio Elías Figueroa	14,188; 20,575	(Argentina) Nicolás Bruzzone	TBA
(Colombia) Cafeteros Pro	Medellín	None	N/A	(Italy) Nicolás Galatro	TBA
(Paraguay) Olímpia Lions	Asunción; Ciudad del Este	Estadio Héroes de Curupayty; Estadio Antonio Aranda	2,500; 23,500	(Argentina) Ricardo Le Fort	TBA
(Uruguay) Peñarol	Montevideo	Estadio Charrúa	14,000	(Argentina) Pablo Bouza	TBA

== Venues ==
Due to the COVID-19 pandemic the 2022 season was held in Chile, Paraguay and Uruguay only. The first phase of the season was held in Asunción, Ciudad del Este, Santiago and Valparaíso respectively. The second phase of the season (including the championship playoffs) was held at Estadio Charrúa in Montevideo.

== Regular season ==
The regular season began on 13 March and ended on 15 May.

=== Standings ===
Key
Advances to the semi-finals

Pos.	Team	Games				Points			Tries			TBP	LBP	Table points
Pos.	Team	Played	Won	Drawn	Lost	For	Against	Diff	For	Against	Diff	TBP	LBP	Table points
1	(Uruguay) Peñarol	10	8	0	2	307	122	+185	41	11	+30	6	2	40
2	(Chile) Selknam	10	8	0	2	289	140	+149	35	17	+18	4	1	37
3	(Argentina) Jaguares XV	10	6	0	4	322	210	+112	45	26	+19	6	1	31
4	(Colombia) Cafeteros Pro	10	4	0	6	168	295	-127	21	41	-20	3	1	20
5	(Paraguay) Olímpia Lions	10	3	0	7	202	286	-84	25	38	-13	2	2	16
6	(Brazil) Cobras	10	1	0	9	145	380	-235	19	53	-34	1	1	6

=== Matches ===
The following are the match results for the 2022 Super Liga Americana de Rugby regular season:

Home \ Away	CAF	COB	JAG	OLI	PEN	SEL
(Colombia) Cafeteros Pro		29–18	17–26	11–10	0–44	19–20
(Brazil) Cobras	17–23		15–84	36–25	10–19	8–37
(Argentina) Jaguares XV	33–22	35–11		49–22	20–27	10–23
(Paraguay) Olímpia Lions	12–16	42–17	21–41		15–13	19–41
(Uruguay) Peñarol	51–28	40–3	32–14	42–14		8–15
(Chile) Selknam	64–3	46–10	20–10	20–22	3–31	

Updated to match(es) played on 15 May 2022. Source:
Legend: Blue = home team win; Yellow = draw; Red = away team win.

=== Round 1 ===
13 March 2022
12:00 CLST

Cobras (Brazil)	10–19	(Uruguay) Peñarol
Try: Daniel Sancery 1'; Con: Lucas Tranquez (1/1) 2'; Pen: Lucas Tranquez (1/1) 70'	Report	Try: Mateo Viñals 13'; Juan Echeverría 26'; Con: Federico Favaro (0/2); Pen: Federico Favaro (3/3) 3', 21', 73'

Estadio Elías Figueroa
Referee: Nehuen Jauri Rivero (UAR) Assistants: Tomás Bertazza (UAR) & Nerea Livoni (UAR)

13 March 2022
15:00 CLST

(1 BP) Jaguares XV (Argentina)	33–22	(Colombia) Cafeteros Pro (1 BP)
Try: Andrea Panzarini (2) 6', 23'; Santiago Mare (2) 38', 42'; Gerónimo Prisciantelli 29'; Con: Santiago Mare (4) 7', 24', 39', 43'; Cards: Ramiro Dagostino (yellow card) 14'; Iñaki Delguy (yellow card) 74'	Report	Try: Javier Corvalán 16'; Eliseo Morales 61'; Felipe Puertas 75'; Diver Ceballos 80'; Con: Leonardo Gea Salim (1) 80+1'

Estadio Elías Figueroa
Referee: Frank Méndez (FRC) Assistants: Martín Eusebio (UAR) & Raimundo Fuenzalida (FRC)

13 March 2022
18:00 CLST

(1 BP) Selknam (Chile)	20–22	(Paraguay) Olímpia Lions
Try: Matiás Garafulic 25'; Matías Dittus 66'; Con: Francisco Urroz (2/2) 26', 67'; Pen: Francisco Urroz (2/3) 46', 73'	Report	Try: Mariano Muntaner 3'; Mariano Garcete 22'; Con: Diego Walter (0/2); Pen: Diego Walter (4/5) 10', 41', 54', 76'; Cards: Daniel Cabral (yellow card) 48'; Enrique Quinteros (yellow card) 65'; Federico Simondi 67'

Estadio Elías Figueroa
Referee: Francisco González (URU)

Assistants: Cauã Ricardo (CBRu) & Nerea Livoni (UAR)

TMO: Tomás Bertazza (UAR)

=== Round 2 ===
19 March 2022
13:00 CLST

(1 BP) Jaguares XV (Argentina)	49–22	(Paraguay) Olímpia Lions
Try: Gerónimo Prisciantelli 2'; Martín Bogado (3) 6', 23', 40'; Santiago Ruiz 10'; Bautista Bernasconi 75'; Jerónimo Gómez Vara 79'; Con: Santiago Mare (5/5) 2', 8', 11', 23', 40'; Gerónimo Prisciantelli (2/2) 77', 80'; Cards: Gerónimo Prisciantelli (yellow card) 43'	Report	Try: Matías Sauze 16'; Conrado Iglesias 30'; Ignacio Inchauspe 56'; Con: Diego Walter (2/3) 19', 32'; Pen: Diego Walter 35'; Cards: Ignacio Gandini (yellow card) 22'

Estadio Elías Figueroa
Referee: Nehuen Jauri Rivero (UAR)

Assistants: Martín Eusebio (UAR) & Frank Méndez (FRC)

TMO: José Ignacio Calle (FRC)

19 March 2022
16:00 CLST

Cafeteros Pro (Colombia)	0–44	(Uruguay) Peñarol (1 BP)
Cards: Javier Corvalán (yellow card) 30'; Joaquín Sánchez (yellow card) 61'	Report	Try: Guillermo Pujadas 22'; Andrés Vilaseca 32'; Felipe Arcos Pérez (2) 63', 80'; Emiliano Faccenini 74'; Nicolás Roger 76'; Con: Federico Favaro (2/2) 23', 33'; Felipe Etcheverry (2/4) 63', 80'; Pen: Federico Favaro (2/4) 18', 28'

Estadio Elías Figueroa
Referee: Cauã Ricardo (CBRu)

Assistants: Francico González (URU) & Raimundo Fuenzalida (FRC)

TMO: José Ignacio Calle (FRC)

19 March 2022
19:00 CLST

(1 BP) Selknam (Chile)	46–10	(Brazil) Cobras
Try: Tomás Dussaillant (2) 7', 40'; Alfonso Escobar 32'; Rodrigo Fernández 41'; Juan Zuccarino 54'; Domingo Saavedra 74'; Con: Francisco Urroz (3/4) 8', 33', 40'; Nicolás Garafulic (2/2) 55', 75'; Pen: Francisco Urroz (2/2) 16', 19'; Cards: Matiás Garafulic (yellow card) 76'	Report	Try: Arthur Bergo 61'; Con: Bautista Santamarina (1/1) 62'; Pen: Lucas Tranquez (1/1) 11'; Cards: Joel Ramírez (yellow card) 30'; Gabriel Paganini (yellow card) 38'; Leonardo de Souza (yellow card) 52'; Cléber Dias (yellow card) 70'

Estadio Elías Figueroa
Referee: Tomás Bertazza (UAR)

Assistants: Martín Eusebio (UAR) & Nerea Livoni (UAR)

TMO: Francisco González (URU)

=== Round 3 ===
25 March 2022
18:00 CLST

Selknam (Chile)	20–10	(Argentina) Jaguares XV
Try: Martín Sigren 25'; Matiás Garafulic 36'; Con: Matiás Garafulic (2/2) 26', 37'; Pen: Matiás Garafulic (2/3) 17', 77'; Cards: Ignacio Silva (yellow card) 41'	Report	Try: Rafael Iriarte 30'; Con: Santiago Mare (1/1) 31'; Pen: Santiago Mare (1/1) 51'

Estadio Municipal de La Pintana
Referee: Francisco González (URU)

Assistants: Felipe Balbontin (FRC) & Andrés Bogado (URP)

TMO: Alejandro Longres (URU)

Note:

- This was the first loss suffered by an Argentinian club in the history of the competition.

26 March 2022
16:00 PYT

(1 BP) Cobras (Brazil)	17–23	(Colombia) Cafeteros Pro
Try: Simon Bienvenu 67'; Joel Santos 72'; Con: Lucas Tranquez (2/2) 68', 73'; Pen: Lucas Tranquez (1/1) 21'; Cards: Gabriel Oliveira (yellow card) 17'; Cléber Dias (yellow card) 52'	Report	Try: Manuel de Marco 16'; Boris Wegner 53'; Con: Julián Hernández (2/2) 18', 55'; Pen: Julián Hernández (3/3) 26', 44', 66'; Cards: Federico Lavanini (yellow card) 20'; Manuel de Marco (yellow card) 71'

Estadio Héroes de Curupayty
Referee: Frank Méndez (FRC)

Assistants: Tomás Bertazza (UAR) & Andrés Bogado (URP)

TMO: Alejandro Longres (URU)

Note:

- This was Cafeteros Pro's first victory in the history of this competition.

27 March 2022
16:00 PYT

Olímpia Lions (Paraguay)	15–13	(Uruguay) Peñarol (1 BP)
Pen: Diego Walter (3/3) 37', 40', 48'; Sebastián Urbieta (2/2) 67', 77'	Report	Try: Guillermo Pujadas 16'; Con: Nicolás Roger (1/1) 17'; Pen: Nicolás Roger (2/2) 4', 46'; Cards: Tomás Etcheverry (yellow card) 63'; Andrés Vilaseca (yellow card) 79'

Estadio Héroes de Curupayty
Referee: Damian Schneider (UAR)

Assistants: Nehuen Jauri Rivero (UAR) & Cauã Ricardo (CBRu)

TMO: Tomás Bertazza (UAR)

=== Round 4 ===
2 April 2022
16:00 PYT

(1 BP) Cafeteros Pro (Colombia)	19–20	(Chile) Selknam
Try: Diver Ceballos 14'; Eliseo Morales 38'; Con: Julián Hernández (0/2); Pen: Julián Hernández (2/3) 24', 77'; Franco Giudice (1/1) 42'; Cards: Joaquín Sánchez (yellow card) 48'	Report	Try: Lukas Carvallo 44'; Franco Pecchia 61'; Con: Francisco Urroz (2/2) 46', 63'; Pen: Francisco Urroz (2/2) 12', 80'

Estadio Antonio Aranda
Referee: Cauã Ricardo (CBRu)

Assistants: Damian Schneider (UAR) & Andrés Bogado (URP)

TMO: Alejandro Longres (URU)

2 April 2022
18:30 PYT

(1 BP) Olímpia Lions (Paraguay)	42–17	(Brazil) Cobras
Try: Penalty try 30'; Federico Simondi 36'; Conrado Iglesias 40'; Ignacio Inchauspe 48'; Julián Quetglas (2) 57', 72'; Con: Sebastián Urbieta (2/4) 40', 58'; Pen: Sebastián Urbieta (2/4) 45', 69'; Cards: Ezequiel Reyes (yellow card) 64'	Report	Try: Robson Moraes 9'; Daniel Lima 20'; Kauã Guimarães 65'; Con: Lucas Tranquez (1/3) 21'; Cards: Gabriel Paganini (yellow card) 30'

Estadio Antonio Aranda
Referee: Nehuen Jauri Rivero (UAR)

Assistants: Tomás Bertazza (UAR) & Raimundo Fuenzalida (FRC)

TMO: Frank Méndez (FRC)

2 April 2022
21:00 PYT

(1 BP) Jaguares XV (Argentina)	20–27	(Uruguay) Peñarol
Try: Juan Bautista Pedemonte 12'; Tomás Cubilla 65'; Con: Gerónimo Prisciantelli (2/2) 13', 66'; Pen: Gerónimo Prisciantelli (2) 33', 43'; Cards: Jerónimo Gómez Vara (yellow card) 28'; Ignacio Ruiz (yellow card) 54'	Report	Try: Andrés Vilaseca 21'; Mateo Viñals 29'; Guillermo Pujadas 55'; Con: Felipe Etcheverry (3/3) 22', 30', 56'; Pen: Felipe Etcheverry (2) 3', 18'

Estadio Antonio Aranda
Referee: Francisco González (URU)

=== Round 5 ===
8 April 2022
16:00 PYT

Selknam (Chile)	3–31	(Uruguay) Peñarol (1 BP)
Pen: Francisco Urroz 20'; Cards: Franco Molina (yellow card) 38'; Salvador Lues (yellow card) 54'; Ignacio Silva (yellow card) 60'	Report	Try: Penalty try (2) 39', 57'; Eric Dosantos 44'; Carlos Deus 70'; Manuel Ardao 77'; Con: Federico Favaro (1/1) 45'; Nicolás Roger (0/2); Pen: Federico Favaro (0/2)

Estadio Antonio Aranda
Referee: Tomás Bertazza (UAR)

Assistants: Francisco González (URU) & Andrés Bogado (URP)

TMO: Nehuen Jauri Rivero (UAR)

8 April 2022
18:30 PYT

(1 BP) Jaguares XV (Argentina)	35–11	(Brazil) Cobras
Try: Iñaki Delguy 14'; Bautista Bernasconi (2) 59', 69'; Rafael Iriarte 80'; Con: Gerónimo Prisciantelli (3/4) 15', 70', 80'; Pen: Gerónimo Prisciantelli (2/2) 38', 52'	Report	Try: Simon Bienvenu 40'; Con: Lucas Tranquez (0/1); Pen: Lucas Tranquez (2/2) 13', 26'; Cards: David Muller (yellow card) 69'

Estadio Antonio Aranda
Referee: Frank Méndez (FRC)

Assistants: Francisco González (URU) & Andrés Bogado (URP)

TMO: Alejandro Longres (URU)

8 April 2022
21:00 PYT

(1 BP) Olímpia Lions (Paraguay)	12–16	(Colombia) Cafeteros Pro
Try: Mariano Garcete 45'; Julián Quetglas 60'; Con: Sebastián Urbieta (1/2) 45'; Pen: Sebastián Urbieta (0/2)	Report	Try: Javier Corvalán 15'; Álvaro Llaver 30'; Con: Julián Hernández (0/2); Pen: Eliseo Morales (2/2) 44', 76'; Cards: Javier Corvalán (yellow card) 43'; Felipe Puertas (yellow card) 59'

Estadio Antonio Aranda
Referee: Damian Schneider (UAR)

Assistants: Raimundo Fuenzalida (FRC) & Cauã Ricardo (CBRu)

TMO: Nehuen Jauri Rivero (UAR)

=== Round 6 ===
23 April 2022
15:30 UYT

Olímpia Lions (Paraguay)	19–41	(Chile) Selknam (1 BP)
Try: Ignacio Inchauspe 19'; Mariano Garcete 31'; Agustín Toth 79'; Con: Diego Walter (2/3) 20', 32'; Pen: Diego Walter (0/1); Cards: Agustín Toth (yellow card) 56'	Report	Try: Tomás Dussaillant 24'; Matías Dittus 56'; Domingo Saavedra 63'; Vittorio Lastra 68'; Nicolás Garafulic 72'; Con: Francisco Urroz (4/4) 25', 57', 64', 69'; Juan Zuccarino (1/1) 73'; Pen: Francisco Urroz (2/3) 9', 50'

Estadio Charrúa
Referee: Damian Schneider (UAR)

Assistants: Matías Esteban (URU) & Simón Larrubia (UAR)

TMO: Francisco Pesce (URU)

23 April 2022
18:00 UYT

Cafeteros Pro (Colombia)	17–26	(Argentina) Jaguares XV (1 BP)
Try: Eliseo Morales 5'; Diver Ceballos 75'; Con: Eliseo Morales (2/2) 6', 76'; Pen: Eliseo Morales (0/1); Drop: Julián Hernández (1/1) 21'; Cards: Gregório Hernández (yellow card) 33'; Brian González (yellow card) 35'	Report	Try: Santiago Ruiz 38'; Martín Bogado (2) 41', 69'; Tomás Cubilla 54'; Con: Santiago Mare (3/4) 39', 42', 55'; Cards: Manuel Bernstein (yellow card) 25'; Aitor Bildosola (yellow card) 71'

Estadio Charrúa
Referee: Nehuen Jauri Rivero (UAR)

Assistants: Gonzalo de Achaval (UAR) & Cauã Ricardo (CBRu)

TMO: Francisco Pesce (URU)

23 April 2022
21:00 UYT

(1 BP) Peñarol (Uruguay)	40–3	(Brazil) Cobras
Try: Manuel Ardao (2) 10', 19'; Felipe Etcheverry 29'; Carlos Deus 35'; Nicolás Roger 56'; Penalty try 66'; Con: Felipe Etcheverry (4/5) 20', 30', 36', 57'	Report	Pen: Bautista Santamarina (1/2) 4'; Cards: Brendon Alves (yellow card) 67'; Alexandre Alves (yellow card) 75'

Estadio Charrúa
Referee: Frank Méndez (FRC)

Assistants: Simón Larrubia (UAR) & Juan Manuel León (FCR)

TMO: Damian Schneider (UAR)

=== Round 7 ===
29 April 2022
15:30 UYT

Cobras (Brazil)	8–37	(Chile) Selknam (1 BP)
Try: Robert Tenório 32'; Con: Lucas Spago (0/1); Pen: Lucas Spago (1) 58'; Cards: Matheus Claudio (yellow card) 53'	Report	Try: Ignacio Silva 21'; Juan Zuccarino 29'; Franco Molina 46'; Clemente Armstrong 72'; Jorge Delgado 80'; Con: Francisco Urroz (2/4) 22', 47'; Pen: Francisco Urroz (2/2) 5', 42'

Estadio Charrúa
Referee: Juan Manuel León (FCR)

Assistants: Nehuen Jauri Rivero (UAR) & Simón Larrubia (UAR)

TMO: Alejandro Longres (URU)

29 April 2022
18:00 UYT

Olímpia Lions (Paraguay)	21–41	(Argentina) Jaguares XV (1 BP)
Try: Enrique Quinteros 28'; Nicolás Hogg 56'; Francisco Díez 70'; Con: Diego Walter (3/3) 29', 57', 71'; Cards: Diego Walter (yellow card) 15'; Enrique Quinteros (yellow card) 49'	Report	Try: Ignacio Mendy (3) 5', 58', 66'; Martín Bogado 17'; Ignacio Ruiz 50'; Juan Bautista Pedemonte 80'; Con: Gerónimo Prisciantelli (4/6) 18', 51', 59', 80'; Pen: Gerónimo Prisciantelli (1/1) 9'; Cards: Ignacio Mendy (yellow card) 34'

Estadio Charrúa
Referee: Frank Méndez (FRC)

Assistants: Francisco González (URU) & Matías Esteban (URU)

TMO: Alejandro Longres (URU)

29 April 2022
20:30 UYT

(1 BP) Peñarol (Uruguay)	51–28	(Colombia) Cafeteros Pro (1 BP)
Try: Federico Favaro 1'; Ignacio Péculo 29'; Santiago Civetta 33'; Manuel Ardao 37'; Felipe Arcos Pérez 42'; Tomás Inciarte 62'; Guillermo Pujadas 70'; Con: Felipe Etcheverry (4/4) 2', 30', 34', 38'; Federico Favaro (0/3); Pen: Felipe Etcheverry (1/1) 19'	Report	Try: Franco Giudice 5'; Leonardo Gea Salim 14'; Boris Wegner 53'; Federico Lavanini 59'; Con: Eliseo Morales (4/4) 6', 15', 53', 60'; Pen: Eliseo Morales (0/1); Cards: Eliseo Fourcade (yellow card) 42'

Estadio Charrúa
Referee: Damian Schneider (UAR)

=== Round 8 ===
4 May 2022
15:30 UYT

(1 BP) Cafeteros Pro (Colombia)	29–18	(Brazil) Cobras
Try: Manuel Alfaro 12'; Julián Hernández 22'; Juan Bautista Mernes 39'; Boris Wegner 47'; Con: Julián Hernández (2/3) 23', 39'; Eliseo Morales (1/1) 48'; Pen: Eliseo Morales (1) 67'	Report	Try: Joel Santos 50'; Bautista Santamarina 55'; Con: Bautista Santamarina (1/2) 56'; Pen: Lucas Spago (1/2) 10'; Bautista Santamarina (1/1) 35'; Drop: Bautista Santamarina (0/1)

Estadio Charrúa
Referee: Francisco González (URU)

Assistants: Juan Manuel León (FCR) & Matías Esteban (URU)

TMO: Frank Méndez (FRC)

4 May 2022
18:00 UYT

(1 BP) Peñarol (Uruguay)	42–14	(Paraguay) Olímpia Lions
Try: Guillermo Pujadas 7'; Baltazar Amaya 44'; Penalty try 60'; Rodrigo Silva (2) 68', 74'; Lucas Bianchi 80'; Con: Felipe Etcheverry (1/2) 8'; Nicolás Roger (1/3) 74'; Pen: Felipe Etcheverry (2/2) 23', 32'; Cards: Carlos Deus (yellow card) 19'	Report	Try: Juan González 1'; Con: Sebastián Urbieta (0/1); Pen: Sebastián Urbieta (3/3) 11', 28', 65'; Cards: Mariano Garcete (yellow card) 40'; Manuel Stuchetti (yellow card) 66'; Facundo Villalba (yellow card) 67'

Estadio Charrúa
Referee: Nehuen Jauri Rivero (UAR)

Assistants: Cauã Ricardo (CBRu) & Simón Larrubia (UAR)

TMO: Alejandro Longres (URU)

4 May 2022
20:30 UYT

Jaguares XV (Argentina)	10–23	(Chile) Selknam
Try: Penalty try 40'; Pen: Gerónimo Prisciantelli (1/3) 66'; Cards: Mayco Vivas (yellow card) 27'; Ignacio Ruiz (yellow card) 52'	Report	Try: Tomás Dussaillant 7'; Con: Francisco Urroz (0/1); Pen: Francisco Urroz (5/7) 20', 49', 70', 76', 80'; Cards: Franco Molina (yellow card) 40'

Estadio Charrúa
Referee: Damian Schneider (UAR)

Assistants: Frank Méndez (FRC) & Gonzalo de Achaval (UAR)

TMO: Alejandro Longres (URU)

=== Round 9 ===
10 May 2022
16:00 UYT

(1 BP) Cobras (Brazil)	36–25	(Paraguay) Olímpia Lions (1 BP)
Try: André Arruda (2) 39', 44'; Daniel Sancery 51'; Cléber Dias 60'; Robert Tenório 63'; Con: Lucas Tranquez (4/5) 40', 45', 61', 64'; Pen: Lucas Tranquez (1/1) 18'; Cards: William Endy (yellow card) 23'	Report	Try: Juan González 27'; Julián Quetglas 30'; Emilio Gorostiaga (2) 77', 79'; Con: Sebastián Urbieta (1/4) 18'; Pen: Sebastián Urbieta (1/1) 54'; Cards: Nicolás Hogg (yellow card) 38'

Estadio Charrúa
Referee: Juan Manuel León (FCR)

Assistants: Gonzalo de Achaval (UAR) & Simón Larrubia (UAR)

TMO: Frank Méndez (FRC)

10 May 2022
18:30 UYT

(1 BP) Selknam (Chile)	64–3	(Colombia) Cafeteros Pro
Try: Franco Molina (2) 1', 30'; Diego Escobar (2) 4', 48'; Gaspar Moltedo 34'; Rodrigo Fernández (2) 40', 74'; Ernesto Ariel Tchimino (2) 60', 66'; Jorge Delgado 70'; Con: Santiago Videla (3/5) 2', 31', 43'; Marcelo Torrealba (1/1) 49'; Matiás Garafulic (3/4) 61', 66', 75'	Report	Pen: Julián Hernández (1/1) 17'; Cards: Juan Bautista Mernes (yellow card) 69'

Estadio Charrúa
Referee: Nehuen Jauri Rivero (UAR)

Assistants: Damian Schneider (UAR) & Cauã Ricardo (CBRu)

TMO: Alejandro Longres (URU)

10 May 2022
21:00 UYT

(1 BP) Peñarol (Uruguay)	32–14	(Argentina) Jaguares XV
Try: Manuel Ardao 40'; Juan Echeverría 51'; Tomás Inciarte 67'; Diego Magno 75'; Con: Felipe Etcheverry (2/3) 40', 52'; Nicolás Roger (1/1) 76'; Pen: Felipe Etcheverry (2/2) 26', 42'; Cards: Ignacio Péculo (yellow card) 16'	Report	Try: Manuel Bernstein 77'; Con: Tomás Suárez Folch (0/1); Pen: Tomás Suárez Folch (3/4) 3', 11', 31'; Cards: Martín Villar (yellow card) 38'

Estadio Charrúa
Referee: Felipe Balbontin (FRC)

Assistants: Samoan Schneider (UAR) & Francisco González (URU)

TMO: Frank Méndez (FRC)

=== Round 10 ===
15 May 2022
15:50 UYT

Cafeteros Pro (Colombia)	11–10	(Paraguay) Olímpia Lions (1 BP)
Try: Leonardo Gea Salim 80'; Con: Eliseo Morales (0/1); Pen: Eliseo Morales (2/4) 29', 54'; Drop: Julián Hernández (0/1); Cards: Julián Hernández (yellow card) 59'	Report	Try: Juan Sánchez 68'; Con: Diego Walter (1/1) 69'; Pen: Diego Walter (1/2) 50'; Cards: Lorenzo Colidio (yellow card) 36'

Estadio Charrúa
Referee: Francisco González (URU)

Assistants: Gonzalo de Achaval (UAR) & Cauã Ricardo (CBRu)

TMO: Alejandro Longres (URU)

15 May 2022
18:00 UYT

Cobras (Brazil)	15–84	(Argentina) Jaguares XV (1 BP)
Try: William Endy 20'; Leonardo de Souza 61'; David Muller 77'; Con: Bautista Santamarina (0/3); Cards: William Endy (yellow card) 44'	Report	Try: Martín Bogado 5'; Ignacio Mendy (5) 4', 7', 23', 70', 80'; Juan Pablo Castro 11'; Agustín Segura 26'; Nicolás Revol Pitt 31'; Penalty try 44'; Gerónimo Prisciantelli 46'; Tomás Suárez Folch 54'; Bautista Bernasconi 65'; Juan Bautista Pedemonte 75'; Con: Gerónimo Prisciantelli (6/13) 24', 27', 32', 66', 71', 76'; Cards: Elisio Chiavassa (yellow card) 53'

Estadio Charrúa
Referee: Frank Méndez (FRC)

Assistants: Felipe Balbontin (FRC) & Simón Larrubia (UAR)

TMO: Francisco Pesce (URU)

15 May 2022
20:30 UYT

(1 BP) Peñarol (Uruguay)	8–15	(Chile) Selknam
Try: Mateo Perillo 10'; Con: Federico Favaro (0/1); Pen: Federico Favaro (1/2) 3'; Cards: Tomás Inciarte (yellow card) 4'; Mateo Viñals (yellow card) 39'	Report	Try: Marcelo Torrealba 42'; Luca Strabucchi 56'; Con: Francisco Urroz (1/2) 45'; Pen: Francisco Urroz (1/1) 35'; Santiago Videla (0/1); Cards: Ignacio Silva (yellow card) 2'

Estadio Charrúa
Referee: Tomás Bertazza (UAR)

Assistants: Cauã Ricardo (CBRu) & Gonzalo de Achaval (UAR)

TMO: Alejandro Longres (URU)

== Knockout stage ==
Semi-finals
20 May - Montevideo
Peñarol	34
Cafeteros Pro	13
20 May - Montevideo
Selknam	16
Jaguares XV	10

Final
27 May - Montevideo
Peñarol	24
Selknam	13

=== Semi-finals ===
20 May 2022
18:00 UYT

Selknam (Chile)	16–10	(Argentina) Jaguares XV
Try: Benjamín Videla 5'; Con: Francisco Urroz (1/1) 10'; Pen: Francisco Urroz (3/4) 17', 54', 75'; Cards: Salvador Lues (yellow card) 35'; Alfonso Escobar (yellow card) 37'; Matías Dittus (yellow card) 47'	Report	Try: Martín Bogado 22'; Con: Gerónimo Prisciantelli (1/1) 23'; Pen: Gerónimo Prisciantelli (1/3) 36'

Estadio Charrúa
Referee: Francisco González (URU)

Assistants: Cauã Ricardo (CBRu) & Gonzalo de Achaval (UAR)

TMO: Alejandro Longres (URU)

20 May 2022
21:00 UYT

Peñarol (Uruguay)	34–13	(Colombia) Cafeteros Pro
Try: Guillermo Pujadas 4'; Lucas Bianchi 33'; Mateo Viñals 47'; Diego Magno 78'; Federico Favaro 80'; Con: Felipe Etcheverry (1/3) 34'; Nicolás Roger (2/2) 79', 80'; Pen: Felipe Etcheverry (1/1) 40'	Report	Try: Brian González 73'; Con: Eliseo Morales (1/1) 74'; Pen: Eliseo Morales (2/3) 15', 51'

Estadio Charrúa
Referee: Nehuen Jauri Rivero (UAR)

Assistants: Frank Méndez (FRC) & Simón Larrubia (UAR)

TMO: Alejandro Longres (URU)

=== Final ===
27 May 2022
19:00 UYT

Peñarol (Uruguay)	24–13	(Chile) Selknam
Try: Eric Dosantos 9'; Manuel Ardao 20'; Con: Felipe Etcheverry (1/2) 10'; Pen: Felipe Etcheverry (3/3) 3', 14', 77'; Drop: Felipe Etcheverry (1/2) 40'; Cards: Nahuel Milan (yellow card) 57'; Juan Echeverría (yellow card) 61'	Report 1 Report 2	Try: Penalty try 57'; Pen: Francisco Urroz (2/2) 24', 47'

Estadio Charrúa
Referee: Nehuen Jauri Rivero (UAR)

Assistants: Francisco González (URU) & Frank Méndez (FRC)

TMO: Gonzalo de Achaval (UAR)

Team details

Peñarol	Selkman

FB	15	José María Iruleguy
RW	14	Rodrigo Silva
OC	13	Bautista Basso
IC	12	Andrés Vilaseca (c)
LW	11	Baltazar Amaya
FH	10	Felipe Etcheverry Iruleguy
SH	9	Tomás Inciarte
N8	8	Manuel Ardao
OF	7	Santiago Civetta
BF	6	Lucas Bianchi
LL	5	Nahuel Milán
RL	4	Eric Dosantos
TP	3	Ignacio Péculo
HK	2	Guillermo Pujadas
LP	1	Juan Echeverría
Substitutes:
	16	Emiliano Faccennini
	17	Matías Benítez,
	18	Mathias Franco
	19	Diego Magno
	20	Carlos Deus
	21	Santiago Álvarez
	22	Nicolás Roger
	23	Mateo Viñals
Coach:
(Argentina) Pablo Bouza

FB	15	Francisco Urroz
RW	14	Nicolás Garafulic
OC	13	Luca Strabucchi
IC	12	Matías Garafulic
LW	11	Gaspar Moltedo
FH	10	Rodrigo Fernández
SH	9	Marcelo Torrealba
N8	8	Alfonso Escobar
OF	7	Ignacio Silva (c)
BF	6	Martín Sigren
LL	5	Augusto Sarmiento
RL	4	Franco Molina
TP	3	Matías Dittus
HK	2	Tomás Dussaillant
LP	1	Javier Carrasco
Substitutes:
	16	Diego Escobar
	17	Salvador Lues
	18	Vittorio Lastra
	19	Santiago Pedrero
	20	Santiago Edwards
	21	Benjamín Videla
	22	Juan Zuccarino
	23	José Larenas
Coach:
(Argentina) Nicolás Bruzzone
