= Manuel Ardao =

Uruguayan rugby union player

- Full name: Manuel Ardao Ferrés
- Born: 9 September 1998 (age 28) Montevideo, Uruguay
- Height: 1.77 m (5 ft 10 in)
- Weight: 92 kg (203 lb)
- Notable relative(s): Diego Ardao (Uruguayan XVs and Sevens international)

Rugby union career
- Position(s): Hooker, Flanker, Number 8
- Current team: Miami Sharks
Youth career
- Christian Brothers College
Senior career
Years	Team	Apps	(Points)
20??-2020	Old Christians Club	??	(??)
2020−2023	Peñarol	34	(65)
2023–2025	Miami Sharks	12	(31)
- Correct as of 15 July 2023
International career
Years	Team	Apps	(Points)
2017−2018	Uruguay Under 20	8	(30)
2018–	Uruguay Sevens	23	(11t)
2018–	Uruguay	23	(10)
- Correct as of 9 September 2023

Manuel Ardao Ferrés (born 9 September 1998) is a Uruguayan rugby union player who generally plays as a flanker. Ardao played for Miami Sharks in Major League Rugby (MLR) and represents Uruguay internationally.

== Career ==
=== Old Christians Club ===
Ardao began his career at Old Christians Club, following in the footsteps of his brother Diego Ardao, He was part of the team that won the national championship in 2019.

=== Peñarol ===
In 2020 he gained a professional contract at Peñarol. He played his first game on March 4, 2020 against Selknam. This match also turns out to be the last of the season, because of the Covid-19 pandemic.

In the following year he featured again for Peñarol, with Peñarol reaching the final of the Superliga Americana de Rugby losing to Jaguares XV 36-28. Ardao started in the next two finals for Peñarol winning both. He was named MVP for the 2022 Súper Liga Americana de Rugby season.

=== Miami Sharks ===
In August 2023, the Miami Sharks signed Ardao for its inaugural season in Major League Rugby. Ardao was ultimately joined on the Sharks by three fellow Uruguayan internationals: Felipe Etcheverry, Tomás Inciarte, and Reinaldo Piussi.

For the 2024 Major League Rugby Season, Ardao had twelve appearances, scoring five tries for a total of 31 points and distinguished himself through excellent defensive play.

== International career ==
Manuel Ardao plays with the Uruguay under-20 team in 2017 and 2018, as part of the World Rugby U20 Trophy. In 2017, his team finished third in the competition. The following year, his team finished in fifth place, but Ardao distinguished himself by scoring six tries in four games.

He made his international debut for Uruguay against Fiji on 17 November 2018. He was included in the Uruguayan squad for the 2019 Rugby World Cup held in Japan marking his first World Cup appearance. He featured in two of Uruguay's games.

== Honours ==
=== Old Christians Club ===
- Uruguayan National Championship, 2019

=== Peñarol ===
- Super Rugby Americas, 2022, 2023

=== Personal ===
- MVP for the 2022 Súper Liga Americana de Rugby season
- All Major League Ruby first team (2025)
