= Francisco Urroz =

Francisco Urroz may refer to:

- Francisco Urroz (footballer)
- Francisco Urroz (rugby union)
