= Pablo Bouza =

Argentine rugby union player

- Born: May 9, 1973 (age 53) Rosario, Argentina
- Height: 6 ft 4 in (1.93 m)
- Weight: 15 st 10 lb (100 kg)

Rugby union career
- Position(s): Number eight, Flanker or Lock
Senior career
Years	Team	Apps	(Points)
1992–2005	Duendes		
2005–2006	Harlequins		
2006–2008	Leeds Tykes		
2008–2010	Duendes		
- Correct as of 25 September 2007
International career
Years	Team	Apps	(Points)
1991	Argentina U19		
1996–2007	Argentina	37	(50)
2005–2007	Argentina A		
- Correct as of 25 September 2007
National sevens team
Years	Team		Comps
1994–2001	Argentina		7
- Correct as of 25 September 2007
Coaching career
- Years: Team
- 2013–2018: Argentina (Assistant coach)
- 2016: Argentina XV
- 2023–pres.: Spain

Pablo Bouza (born 9 May 1973) is an Argentine rugby union coach and former player who won 37 caps playing at No 8, flanker or lock for the Argentine rugby union side.

He played club rugby in England between 2005 and 2008 with Harlequins and Leeds Carnegie (formerly Leeds Tykes), playing in the top-level Guinness Premiership competition.

Bouza is the son of former Argentine international Mario Bouza.

== Playing career ==
Bouza first started playing senior rugby for Duendes Rugby Club in Rosario, Argentina where he was captain, and whilst at Duendes, Bouza made his international test debut at the age of 26 in June 1996 against Uruguay in a 37–18 victory. He also represented Argentina at international 7s level, being selected in the squad for the 1997 Rugby World Cup Sevens.

He missed out on selection for the 1999 Rugby World Cup, but when selected for the 2003 Rugby World Cup he scored four tries in two games and was the only forward in the top ten try scorers.

In August 2005, Bouza moved to England to play professionally, at first with NEC Harlequins in National Division One, where he made only five appearances for the Quins in their promotion winning season. He later joined Leeds Tykes for the National Division One 2006/07 season on a one-year deal. He was the Tykes 16th signing of the pre-season and he made his debut against London Welsh on 3 September 2006 at Headingley, replacing Chris Murphy who had retired. He was the fifth Argentine international in Tykes colours after Octavio Bartolucci, Hernán Senillosa, Diego Albanese and Martín Schusterman.

Director of Rugby Stuart Lancaster said at the time: "Pablo is a vastly experienced international second row who will be a great addition to our squad for next season. I have spoken to Dean Richards, his coach last season, regarding his qualities and he has nothing but praise for him both for his ability and his attitude to the game. He will give us good strength in the second row and I am looking forward to having him in our group."

For the second straight year, Bouza was a member of a team that earned promotion to the Guinness Premiership. He played one season in the top flight deomestic competition and in Europe, and after Leeds were relegated, Bouza was released by the club. After being released, returned to Duendes and retired in 2010 aged 38.

=== Honours ===
Argentina / Argentina XV

- South American Rugby Championship
  - Winner: 1997, 2002, 2003, 2004, 2006
- PARA Pan American Championship
  - Winner: 2003
- World Rugby Nations Cup
  - Winner: 2006
  - Runner-up: 2007
- Churchill Cup
  - Winner: 2005

Duendes Rugby Club

- Nacional de Clubes
  - Winner: 2004
  - Runner-up: 1999, 2003
- Torneo del Litoral
  - Winner: 1993, 1996, 2000, 2002

== Coaching ==
After retiring in 2010, Bouza began working at PladAR, a high-performance training centre within the UAR, where he had the opportunity to coach at Rosario and travel with Argentina U20s. It was from here, he was appointed as Assistant Coach for the Argentine national team in 2013, working under newly appointed Head Coach Daniel Hourcade.

Whilst with Hourcade, Argentina secured their maiden Rugby Championship win in 2014, beating Australia (21–17) for the first time since 1997. They also secured a historic first win over South Africa in 2015 and finished fourth during the 2015 Rugby World Cup.

In early 2016, he became Head Coach of the national 'A' team, Argentina XV, and led the side to a title winning 2016 Americas Rugby Championship.

In July 2018 Hourcade left his post as Head Coach and was replaced with Mario Ledesma, and after the 2018 Rugby Championship, Bouza left the senior set up.

After departing Argentina, Bouza began working as a High Performance advisor for Sudamérica Rugby and World Rugby, working closes with Uruguay in preparation for the 2019 Rugby World Cup. His connections with Uruguay broadened, and in 2020 became Head Coach at Peñarol Rugby in the inaugural Super Rugby Americas competition. Whilst as the side, the Uruguayan franchise was two-time champions, winning in back-to-back titles in 2022 and 2023.

In October 2023, Bouza was announced as Head Coach of Spain, and his first match in charge was a 42–20 victory over Canada in the La Vila International Rugby Cup. They later lose to the United States to finish as runners-up of the completion.

In March 2024, Spain finished third in the 2024 Rugby Europe Championship, and later that year, embarked on a historic Pacific Islands tour to aid in development ahead of the World Cup qualification process in 2025. World Rugby supporters the tour and arranged test matches again Samoa (losing 34–30) and Tonga; which Spain won 29–20 to see them defeat Tonga for the first time, as well as gain their first win over any of the Pacific Island nation.

In March 2025, Bouza led Spain to World Cup qualification for the first time since 1999.

Sporting positions
Preceded by (Spain) Santiago Santos	Spain national rugby union coach 2023–Present	Succeeded by Incumbent
