= Eliseo Morales (rugby union) =

Argentine rugby union player (born 1998)

- Full name: Eliseo Nicolas Morales Abraham
- Born: 11 March 1998 (age 28)
- Height: 180 cm (5 ft 11 in)
- Weight: 80 kg (176 lb)

Rugby union career
- Position: Scrum-half
International career
Years	Team	Apps	(Points)
2022	Argentina	1	(0)

Eliseo Nicolas Morales Abraham (born 11 March 1998) is an Argentine professional rugby union player.

A native of Salta, Morales picked up rugby union at the age of six and started his career with local side Universitario de Salta, a club his father and two brothers have also competed for. He was selected to represent Argentina at the 2018 World Rugby Under 20 Championship, but ended up sidelined with injury.

Morales played for Colombian franchise Cafeteros Pro in the 2022 Súper Liga Americana de Rugby season.

After touring the United States with the Jaguares XV in 2022, Morales was an unused member in the Pumas squad for the 2022 Rugby Championship, then won his first cap on their end-of-year tour of Europe, as a second-half replacement scrum-half for Gonzalo Bertranou against Wales at Millennium Stadium.

Morales switched to Pampas for the 2023 Super Rugby Americas season and tore a cruciate ligament in his left knee during their semi-final loss to Dogos, which ruled him out of World Cup contention.

== See also ==
- List of Argentina national rugby union players
