= Reinaldo Piussi =

Uruguayan rugby union player

- Full name: Reinaldo Piussi Mendoza
- Born: 18 May 1999 (age 27) Montevideo, Uruguay
- Height: 190 cm (6 ft 3 in)
- Weight: 129 kg (284 lb; 20 st 4 lb)

Rugby union career
- Position: Prop
- Current team: Miami Sharks
Youth career
- 2019–2020: Oyonnax
Amateur team(s)
Years	Team	Apps	(Points)
- Dolores
- Old Christians
Senior career
Years	Team	Apps	(Points)
2023	Peñarol	5	(0)
2024–2025	Miami Sharks	8	(5)
- Correct as of 17 March 2024
International career
Years	Team	Apps	(Points)
2018–2020	Uruguay U20		
2022–	Uruguay	6	(0)
- Correct as of 17 March 2024

Reinaldo Piussi (born 18 May 1999) is an Uruguayan rugby union player who has played for Peñarol in Super Rugby Americas and the Miami Sharks in Major League Rugby (MLR), as well as the Uruguay national rugby union team. His preferred position is prop.

== Early career ==
Piussi is from Montevideo and plays his club rugby for Carrasco Polo Club. His performances for Uruguay's U20 side, earned him a move to Oyonnax to join their academy.

== Professional career ==
Piussi was named in the Peñarol squad for the 2023 Super Rugby Americas season, making two appearances. He signed for the Miami Sharks ahead of the 2024 Major League Rugby season.

Piussi made his debut for Uruguay in 2022 against Tonga. He was named in the Uruguay squad for the 2023 Rugby World Cup, making two appearances at the tournament.
