= Daylight saving time in Uruguay =

Since 2004, Uruguay had usually observed daylight saving time. Starting in 2006, DST begins on the first Sunday in October and ends on the second Sunday in March of every year. Time zone changed from Standard Time Zone UTC−03:00 to UTC−02:00.

On 30 June 2015 however, Uruguayan government decided to abolish DST from this year putting the country in UTC−03:00 throughout the 2015-2016 Summer.

In September 2016 the president issued the same decision for that year, keeping the country in UTC−03:00 during the 2016-2017 Summer also. There is some discussion/concern over the lack of clarity as to the state of summer time in future years.

== See also ==
- Time in Uruguay
- America/Montevideo
