= Gerónimo Prisciantelli =

Argentine rugby union player

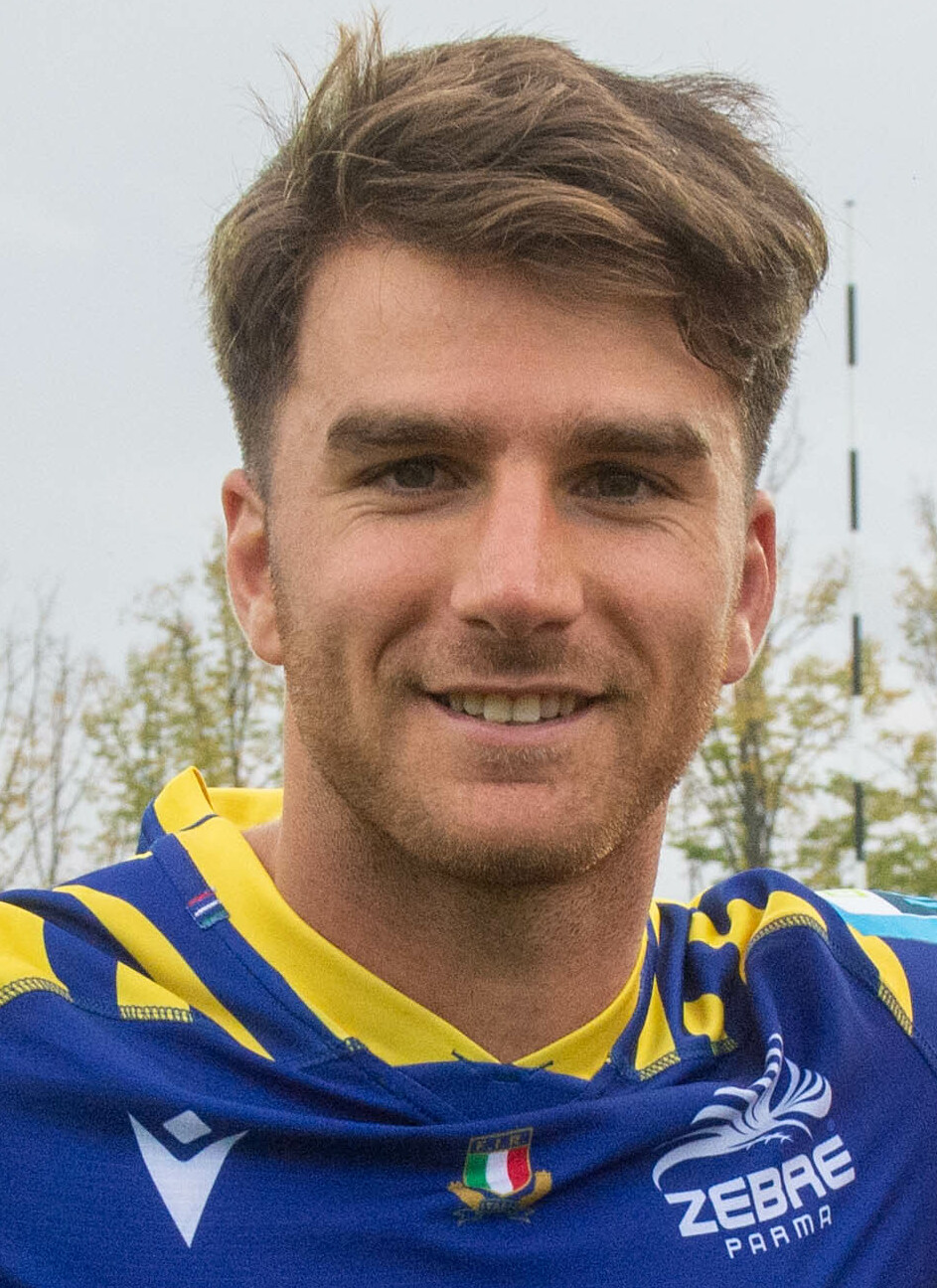
- Prisciantelli in 2022
- Born: 23 August 1999 (age 27) Buenos Aires, Argentina
- Height: 1.83 m (6 ft 0 in)
- Weight: 88 kg (13.9 st; 194 lb)

Rugby union career
- Position: Fly-Half / Centre / Fullback
Senior career
Years	Team	Apps	(Points)
2019–2022	CASI	28	(91)
2021–2022	Jaguares XV	18	(90)
2022–2025	Zebre Parma	51	(158)
2025–	Racing 92	14	(42)
- Correct as of 8 Jul 2025
International career
Years	Team	Apps	(Points)
2019	Argentina U20s	4	(5)
2022	Argentina XV	4	(46)
- Correct as of 1 February 2021
National sevens team
Years	Team		Comps
2019	Argentina Sevens		1
- Correct as of 1 February 2021

Gerónimo Prisciantelli (born 23 August 1999) is an Argentine rugby union player, currently playing for Racing in Top 14. He is a utility back that can play fullback, fly-half or centre.

== Professional career ==
Prisciantelli signed for Súper Liga Americana de Rugby side Jaguares XV ahead of the 2021 Súper Liga Americana de Rugby season. He played for Jaguares also for 2022 Súper Liga Americana de Rugby season.

In September 2022 he joined Zebre Parma in United Rugby Championship until the end of the 2024–25 season, when he joined Racing in Top 14.

== International career ==
He had previously represented Argentina U20s and Argentina Sevens in 2019.

In summer 2022, he was selected for Argentina XV squad for official tests.

In July 2025, he was called up by Felipe Contepomi to join Argentina's squad for their summer test matches.
