= Rodrigo Fernández (rugby union) =

Chile international rugby union player

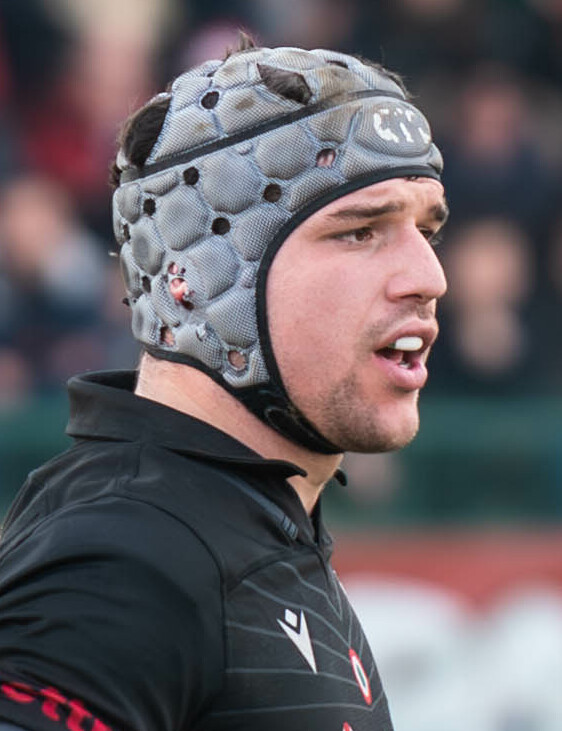
- Fernández in 2023
- Full name: Rodrigo Fernández Grosetete
- Born: 8 February 1996 (age 30) Santiago, Chile
- Height: 1.83 m (6 ft 0 in)
- Weight: 82 kg (181 lb; 12 st 13 lb)

Rugby union career
- Position(s): Fly-half, Fullback
- Current team: Colorno
Senior career
Years	Team	Apps	(Points)
2021–2023	Selknam	21	(25)
2023–2024	Petrarca Padova	15	(48)
2024–2025	Colorno	15	
- Correct as of 27 January 2024
International career
Years	Team	Apps	(Points)
2016–	Chile	27	(62)
2017–2020	Chile A	7	(15)
- Correct as of 27 January 2024
National sevens team
Years	Team		Comps
2016–2020	Chile		8 (161pts)
- Correct as of 27 January 2024

Rodrigo Fernández Grosetete (born 8 February 1996) is a Chilean professional rugby union player who plays as a fly-half for Italian Serie A Elite club Colorno and the Chile national team.

== Club career ==
Rodrigo Fernández started playing rugby union as a child in his hometown of Santiago, while attending Craighouse School4. After his schooling, he played with the school's alumni club, Craighouse Old Boys (COBS), with whom he played in the Chilean Championship from 2014. He won the competition in 2016, 2018 and 2021. In 2021, he joined the Chilean professional franchise Selknam, which plays in the Súper Liga Americana de Rugby. In his first season, he was used only as a fullback, and played seven games for one try. His team finished the season as semi-finalists, after a defeat against Uruguayan Peñarol. The following season, Fernández signed for Súper Liga Americana de Rugby side Selknam ahead of the 2021 Súper Liga Americana de Rugby season. He played an active part in his team's good run, finishing second in the regular season, then losing in the final to Peñarol. From a personal point of view, he played this time at fly-half, and scored three tries in six games. He played with Seknam until 2023 Super Rugby Americas season For 2023–24 season, he signed for Italian Serie A Elite team Petrarca Padova.

== International career ==
He had previously played for both the Chile national side and the Chile Sevens side. Rodrigo Fernández was selected for the first time with the Chilean rugby union team in April 2016 to participate in the South American Championship. He earned his first international cap on April 23, 2016, in a match against Paraguay in Santiago, and scored a try on that occasion. Sharing his time with the sevens selection, Fernández played episodically with Los Cóndores until 2019. After the interruption of competitions related to the COVID-19 pandemic, he only played XV and in 2020 played the Sudamericano Cuatro Naciones with the Chile XV team (national reserve team). In 2021, he participated in the first rounds of the American qualifying tournament for the 2023 World Cup. After a second-place finish in the South American tournament, Chile participated in the America 2 Play-off, which consisted of a double confrontation against Canada in October 2021. His team won a historic victory in the return match in Valparaíso, allowing them to advance to the qualifying play-off match played in July 2022. Fernández particularly stood out in this match by scoring a 50-metre try on a personal exploit, and providing an assist. His try against Canada was subsequently named "American Try of the Year" by the Americas Rugby News website. In June 2022, he was part of the Chilean squad selected to play in the second part of the qualifiers. He was named captain for the warm-up match against Scotland A, which his team lost 45 to 5. He then took part in the double confrontation against the United States, which saw his country win and officially qualify for the world competition.

On 27 August, he was named in the 30-player squad for the 2023 Rugby World Cup. He started at fly-half in four of his team's matches, all of which his team lost, and which was eliminated at the end of the group stage. However, he distinguished himself in the first match of the competition, against Japan, by scoring Chile's first try in the history of the World Cup.

=== Rugby Sevens ===
Fernández was selected with the Chilean rugby sevens team in February 2016 to play in the America's Cup in San Diego. With his sevens selection, he participated in the Hong Kong Qualifying Tournament between 2017 and 2019. He also played in regional tournaments, winning the rugby sevens event at the Bolivarian Games in 2017, or that of the South American Games in 2018. In 2018, he was part of the Chilean group that played in the Rugby World Cup Sevens in San Francisco, where his team won the Bowl (consolation tournament for 17th place). He also had the opportunity to play in the South American Championship from 2018, and was part of the team that won this competition in January 2019. Later in 2019, he had the opportunity to play in two stages of the World Rugby Sevens Series in 2019. He was part of the team that managed to draw against the reigning champion South Africa (5-5) in the Las Vegas tournament. The following year, he played in the Sevens Challenger Series, where he was considered one of the best players in the competition, having finished as top scorer and scorer in the Viña del Mar tournament.
