= Manuel Diana =

Uruguayan rugby union player

- Full name: Manuel Diana Olaso
- Born: 7 March 1996 (age 30) Montevideo, Uruguay
- Height: 190 cm (6 ft 3 in)
- Weight: 106 kg (234 lb)
- Occupation: rugby player

Rugby union career
- Position: Number 8
- Current team: Toronto Arrows
Senior career
Years	Team	Apps	(Points)
2020−2021	Toronto Arrows	18	(25)
2022−	Peñarol Rugby		
- Correct as of 3 March 2020
International career
Years	Team	Apps	(Points)
2015	Uruguay Under 20	4	(20)
2016–present	Uruguay	38	(35)
- Correct as of 9 September 2023

Manuel Diana Olaso (Note: In this Spanish name, the first or paternal surname is Diana and the second or maternal family name is Olaso.) (born 7 March 1996) is a Uruguayan rugby union player, currently playing for Súper Liga Americana de Rugby side Peñarol. He previously played as a number eight for the Toronto Arrows in Major League Rugby (MLR). He also represents Uruguay internationally.

Diana attended Stella Maris College and the University of Montevideo. He was included in the Uruguayan squad for the 2019 Rugby World Cup which was held in Japan for the first time and also marked his first World Cup appearance.

== Career ==
He made his international debut for Uruguay against Argentina XV on 11 February 2017.
