= Guillermo Pujadas =

Uruguayan rugby union player

- Full name: Guillermo Leon Pujadas
- Born: 6 February 1997 (age 29) Montevideo, Uruguay
- Height: 1.8 m (5 ft 11 in)
- Weight: 110 kg (243 lb)

Rugby union career
- Position: Hooker
- Current team: Peñarol
Senior career
Years	Team	Apps	(Points)
2020−	Peñarol	1	(0)
- Correct as of 9 September 2019
International career
Years	Team	Apps	(Points)
2016	Uruguay Under 20	8	(10)
2018–present	Uruguay	28	(5)
- Correct as of 1 September 2023

Guillermo Leon Pujadas (born 6 February 1997) is a Uruguayan rugby union player who generally plays as a hooker represents Uruguay internationally. He was included in the Uruguayan squad for the 2019 Rugby World Cup which was held in Japan for the first time and also marked his first World Cup appearance.

== Career ==
He made his international debut for Uruguay against Fiji on 17 November 2018.
