= Ryan James (rugby union) =

United States rugby union player

- Born: 19 September 1999 (age 27) San Diego, United States
- Height: 1.83 m (6 ft 0 in)
- Weight: 86 kg (190 lb; 13 st 8 lb)

Rugby union career
- Position: Wing / Fullback
Senior career
Years	Team	Apps	(Points)
2019-2020	Colorado Raptors	1	(0)
2020–2022	LA San Diego Legion	25	(30)
2023-	San Diego Legion	7	(5)
- Correct as of 24 October 2021
International career
Years	Team	Apps	(Points)
2021–	United States	1	(0)
- Correct as of 24 October 2021

Ryan James (born 19 September 1999) is a United States rugby union player who plays for the LA Giltinis of Major League Rugby (MLR) and the United States national team. His preferred position is wing or fullback.

== Professional career ==
James signed for Major League Rugby side LA Giltinis for the 2021 Major League Rugby season, having represented the now defunct Colorado Raptors during the 2020 season.

James debuted for United States against New Zealand during the 2021 end-of-year rugby union internationals.
