= Rugby union in Colombia =

- Country: Colombia
- Governing body: Federación Colombiana de Rugby
- National team: Colombia
- First played: Before 1986
- Registered players: 15,000
- Clubs: 80

National competitions
- Rugby World Cup; Rugby World Cup Sevens; World Rugby Sevens Series; Americas Rugby Challenge

Rugby union in Colombia is a minor but growing sport, with around 15,000 registered players and 80 rugby union clubs in Colombia. The Colombian national team is currently ranked 44th by World Rugby.

The governing body is the Colombian Rugby Federation (Federación Colombiana de Rugby or F.C.R. in Spanish)

== History ==
Rugby was first introduced into Colombia from the southern parts of South America, but really started going in the mid-1970s, when British and French expats, along with Colombians who had received rugby training at the Alianza Francesa, played on Sundays in Bogotá. By the 1990s there was a growing number of Colombians engaged in the sport. In 1977 Colombia hosted a visiting team from Ecuador, and in 1978 a Colombian team captained by Brian Perry (veterinarian) from the Bogota Sports Club travelled to Ecuador, playing the international match on a ground near the equator north of the capital Quito.

In Colombia, rugby is not well supported by the government or media, as football (soccer) has a stronger tradition in the country. The Colombian rugby team is called Los Tucanes.

The game is centred nowadays in most regions, with a very strong presence in Medellín, due to wide support from the local government, which uses rugby for social and performance programs.

Brian Perry (veterinarian) initiated sevens rugby in Bogota in 1977 with mostly expats, then Hans Joseph Rausch, a Medellín-born player, who in 1994, after having played in Pittsburg, introduced Rugby to locals and started the first Colombian generation of players.

Los Tucanes, have been active internationally since 2000, although the Colombian Federation just became official in 2010. They have won five of the last seven U18s "Suramericano B" Tournaments (against Venezuela, Peru, Ecuador) and the last four with their senior side. Right now they are disputing with Paraguay a spot in the "Suramericano A" (against Chile, Uruguay, Argentina, Brasil).

== Women's rugby ==
- Colombia women's national rugby union team

Colombia's women's national side qualified for the 2016 Olympics in Rio de Janeiro and has a strong presence by South American level standards.

== National teams ==
- The Colombia national rugby union team competes in rugby fifteens competitions, such as the South American Rugby Championship (Suramericano B).
- The Colombia national rugby sevens team competes in South American rugby sevens competitions, and in all the Olympic qualifying cycle events.

== See also ==
- Sudamerica Rugby
