= Francisco Urroz (rugby union) =

Chilean rugby union player

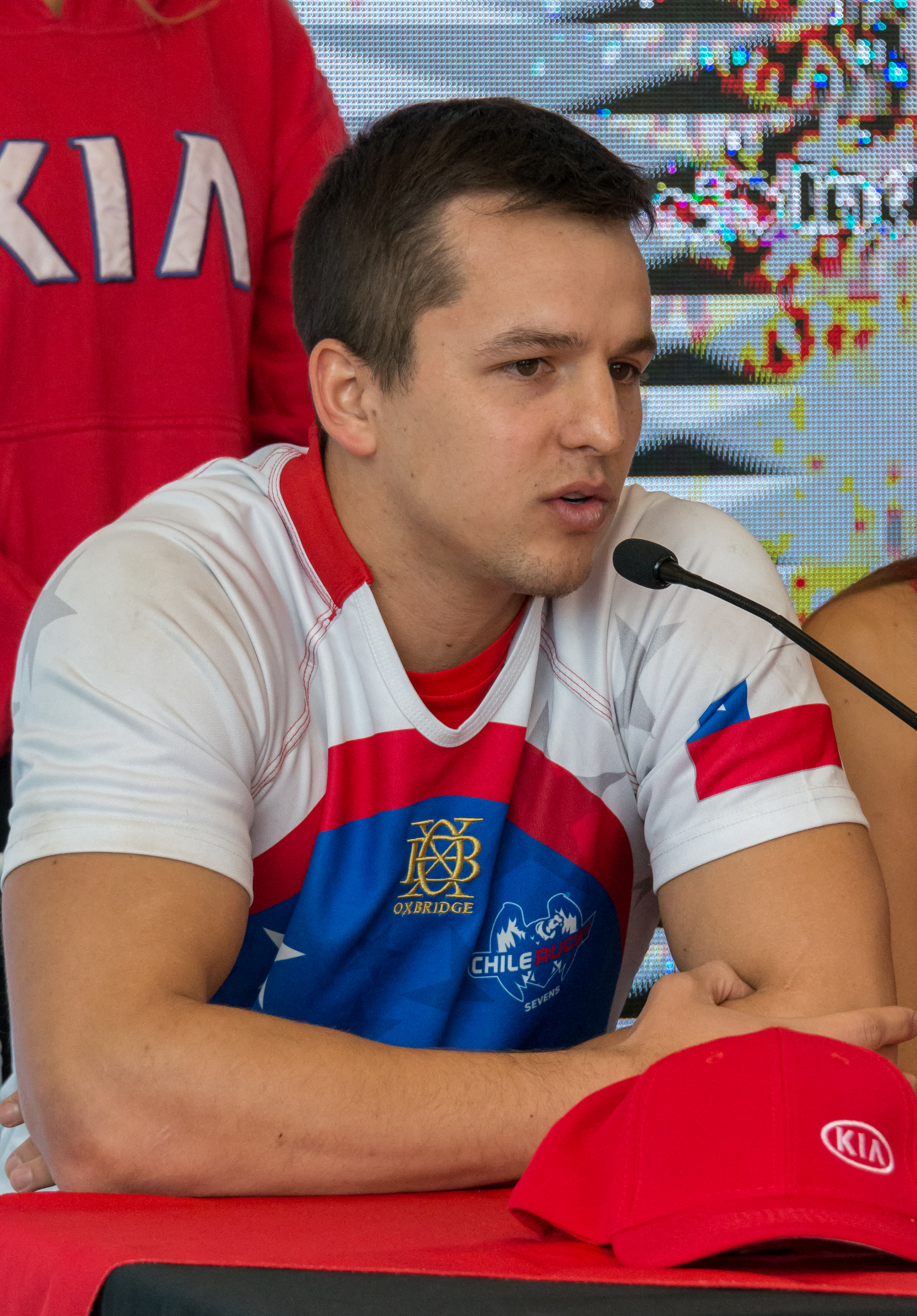
- Urroz in 2019
- Full name: Francisco Tomas Urroz Richter
- Born: 7 September 1993 (age 33) Santiago, Chile
- Height: 1.86 m (6 ft 1 in)
- Weight: 85 kg (187 lb; 13 st 5 lb)

Rugby union career
- Position(s): Fullback, Fly-half
- Current team: Selknam
Senior career
Years	Team	Apps	(Points)
2020–	Selknam	20	(131)
- Correct as of 28 August 2023
International career
Years	Team	Apps	(Points)
2012–2013	Chile U20	7	(50)
2015–	Chile	11	(13)
2019–2020	Chile A	4	(14)
- Correct as of 28 August 2023
National sevens team
Years	Team		Comps
2015–2019	Chile		9
- Correct as of 28 August 2023

Francisco Tomas Urroz Richter (born 7 September 1993) is a Chilean professional rugby union player who plays as a fullback for Super Rugby Americas club Selknam and the Chile national team.

== Club career ==
Urroz signed for Súper Liga Americana de Rugby side Selknam ahead of the 2020 Súper Liga Americana de Rugby season, and re-signed ahead of the 2022 Súper Liga Americana de Rugby season.

== International career ==
He had previously played for both the Chile national side and the Chile Sevens side.
