= Time in Uruguay =

Uruguay is located at a longitude appropriate for a UTC−04:00 time zone offset, but it actually uses a UTC−03:00 offset. Uruguay used to observe daylight saving time (UTC−02:00) from October until March. On 30 June 2015, the Uruguayan government decided to abolish DST, establishing the UTC−03:00 time zone all year round. The term "UYT" is used in and out of the country to convey specific Uruguay time.

== IANA time zone database ==
In the file zone.tab of the IANA time zone database Uruguay has the following zone:

- America/Montevideo, covering all its territory

== See also ==
- Daylight saving time in Uruguay
- Time in Argentina
- Time in Brazil
