= Felipe Etcheverry =

Uruguayan rugby union player

- Full name: Felipe Etcheverry Cavanna
- Born: 23 June 1996 (age 30) Montevideo, Uruguay
- Height: 1.74 m (5 ft 9 in)
- Weight: 75 kg (165 lb)

Rugby union career
- Position: Fly-Half
Senior career
Years	Team	Apps	(Points)
2020−2023	Peñarol	27	(212)
2024–2025	Miami Sharks	4	(51)
- Correct as of 24 March 2024
International career
Years	Team	Apps	(Points)
2019–	Uruguay	20	(0)
- Correct as of 9 September 2023

Felipe Etcheverry Cavanna (born 23 June 1996) is a Uruguayan rugby union player who generally plays as a fullback represents Uruguay internationally. He was a player in the Uruguayan squad for the 2019 Rugby World Cup and 2023 Rugby World Cup. He is of Basque descent.

== Career ==
Etcheverry made his international debut for Uruguay against Russia on 4 June 2019. In 2022, he competed for Uruguay at the Rugby World Cup Sevens in Cape Town.
