= Tomás Inciarte =

Uruguayan rugby union player

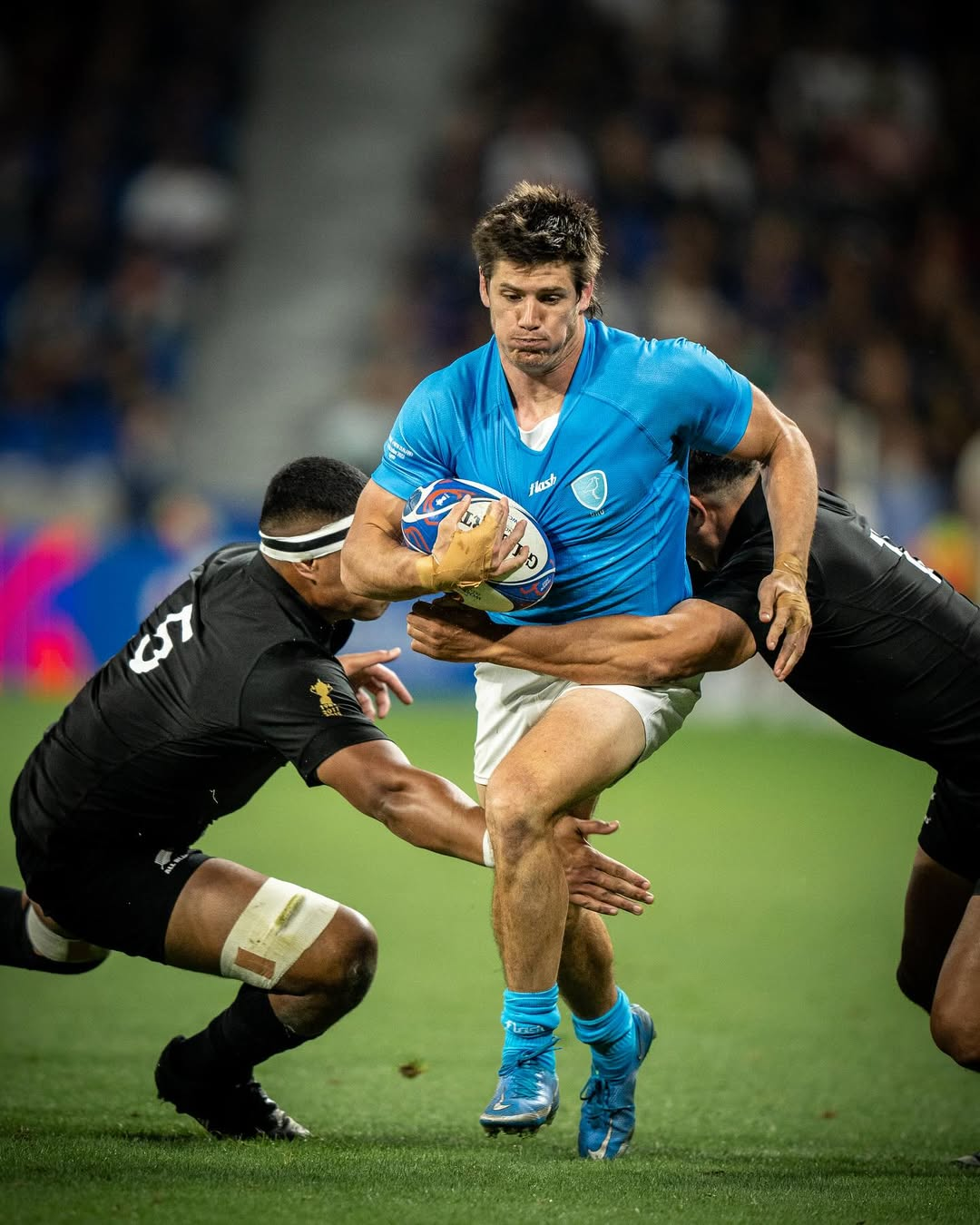
- Tomás Inciarte in the 2023 Rugby World Cup.
- Full name: Tomás Inciarte Rachetti
- Born: 22 October 1996 (age 30) Montevideo, Uruguay
- Height: 180 cm (5 ft 11 in)
- Weight: 83 kg (183 lb)

Rugby union career
- Position(s): Outside centre & Scrum half
- Current team: Peñarol
Senior career
Years	Team	Apps	(Points)
2020−	Peñarol	1	(0)
- Correct as of 25 September 2019
International career
Years	Team	Apps	(Points)
2018–present	Uruguay	32	(15)
- Correct as of 9 September 2023

Tomás Inciarte Rachetti (born 22 October 1996) is a Uruguayan rugby union player who plays as a centre or scrum half and represents Uruguay internationally. He was included in the Uruguayan squad for the 2019 Rugby World Cup which was held in Japan for the first time and also marked his first World Cup appearance.

== Career ==
As of 2019, Inciarte played his club rugby for Old Christians Club. He made his international debut for Uruguay against Brazil on 9 February 2018. He made his debut World Cup match appearance in Uruguay's opening game against Fiji on 25 September 2019 where Uruguay stunned Fiji 30–27 in Pool D clash.
