= Estadio Charrúa =

Stadium in Montevideo, Uruguay

Charrúa Stadium
- Estadio Charrúa
- Tierra de Teros
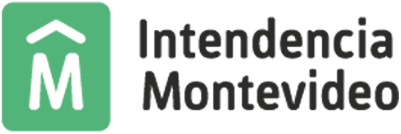

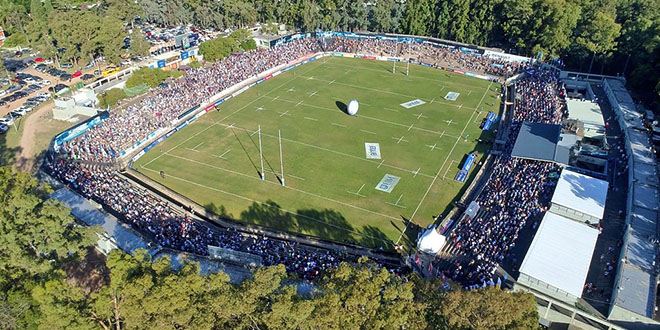
- Aerial view of the stadium in 2018
- Interactive map of Charrúa Stadium
- Full name: Estadio de Alternativa Charrúa
- Address: Av. Bolivia s/n Montevideo; Uruguay
- Coordinates: 34.8784°S 56.0893°W
- Owner: Montevideo Department
- Operator: URU; AUF
- Capacity: 14,000
- Surface: GrassMaster
- Field size: 100 x 75 m

Construction
- Opened: 1984; 42 years ago
- Renovated: 2006, 2018
- Structural engineer: Juan Berta

Tenants
- Uruguay national rugby union team; Uruguay women's national football team; Peñarol Rugby

Website
- municipioe.montevideo.gub.uy/estadio

Estadio Charrúa is a stadium in the Carrasco neighborhood of Montevideo, Uruguay, used mostly for rugby union and also sometimes for football. Property of the Montevideo Department, it is currently leased to the Uruguayan Rugby Union and Uruguayan Football Association after an agreement signed in 2012. The stadium holds 14,000 people.

Estadio Charrúa has been a frequent venue of teams such as the Uruguay national rugby union team, Uruguay women's national football team, Peñarol Rugby and Montevideo City Torque.

== History ==
Originally planned and built as a football venue in 1984, in 2006 it was re-built thanks to a FIFA project called GOAL.

Local club Peñarol attempted to acquire the stadium in 1993, but those negotiations did not prosper. The club made a new attempt in 2001 with a project that included its expansion to 30,000 spectators with an investment of US$8 million. With a period of concession of 30 years, refurbishments also included new press boxes, dressing rooms, and parking lot. Nevertheless the Montevideo Neighborhood Council rejected the project due to "the negative impact for the area (...) the deterioration of the quality of life of the residents and the devaluation of their patrimony".

In December 2012 the Municipality of Montevideo signed a contract of concession with both bodies, Uruguayan Rugby Union (URU) and Uruguayan Football Association (AUF) for ten years. The URU used the stadium for its headquarters, its high performance training center, and as the regular home of its national teams, most notably the senior men's team.

Since 2013 the stadium has hosted Uruguay national rugby union team matches, and has also hosted Charrúas (American football national team of Uruguay) matches, and even concerts. The name Charrúa refers to Indigenous peoples in Uruguay.

In football, the stadium is the home venue for Montevideo City Torque matches since 2020, when the team moved from Estadio Centenario.

== Events ==
=== Football ===
The stadium was one of three venues for the 2018 FIFA U-17 Women's World Cup, hosting all matches of Group A and D, plus semi-finals, third place and final. Estadio Charrúa also hosted all the matches of 2022 South American U-17 Women's Championship.

=== Rugby ===
After the agreement signed in 2012, Estadio Charrúa became a frequent venue of the Uruguay national team, having hosted several World Cup qualification and test matches. The stadium has also been Peñarol's home venue for their games at the Super Rugby Americas since its first edition in 2020.

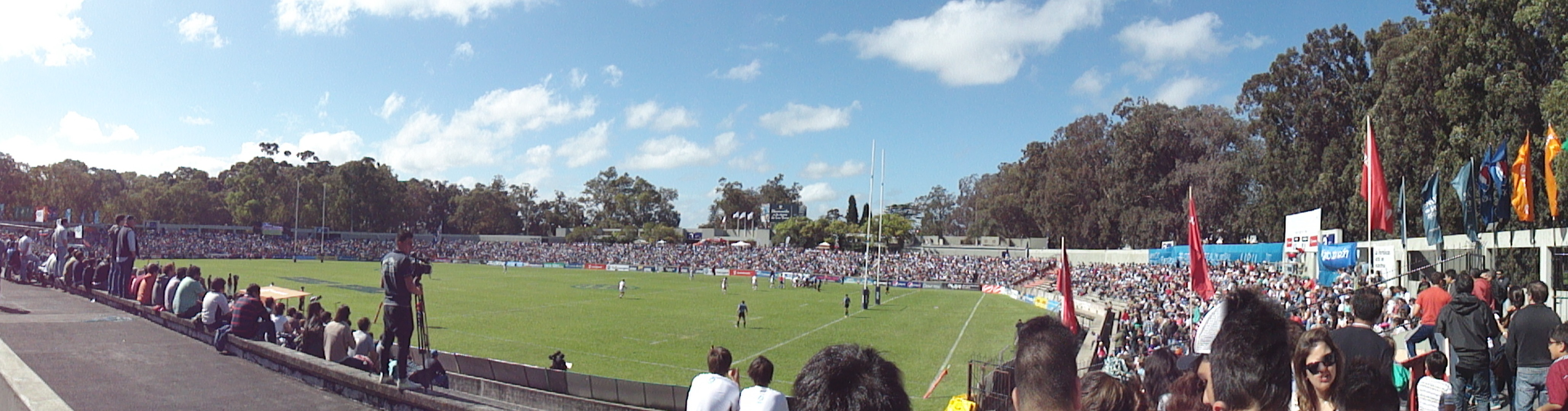
Panoramic view of Estadio Charrúa during the 2015 Rugby World Cup qualifier match, Uruguay vs Russia

=== Concerts ===
Some artists that performed at Estadio Charrúa were Andrés Calamaro, Daddy Yankee, Joan Manuel Serrat and Joaquín Sabina, Marc Anthony, No Te Va Gustar, La Vela Puerca, Ricardo Arjona, Selena Gomez & the Scene, and Silvio Rodríguez.

== Gallery ==
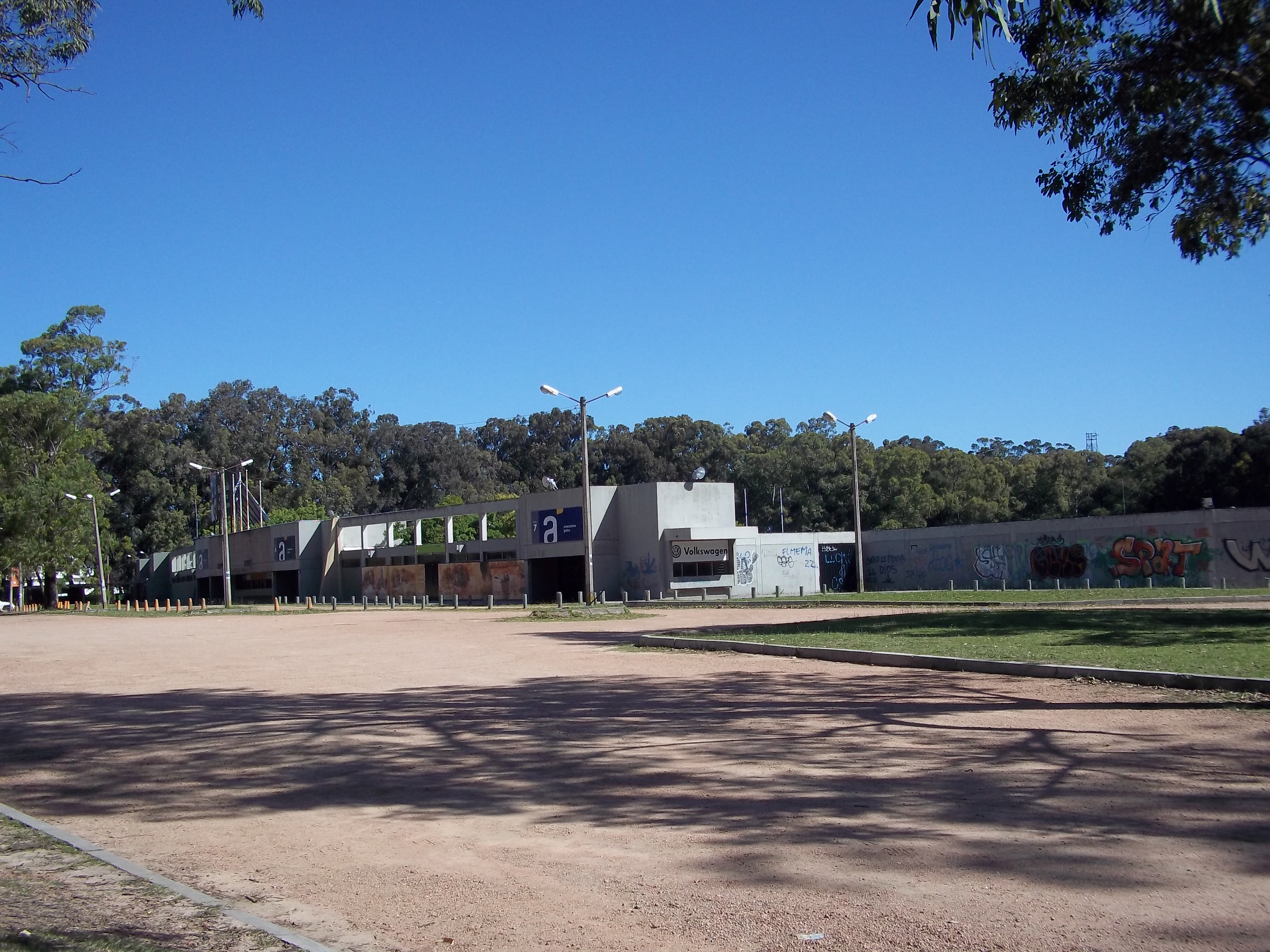
Exterior view in 2013

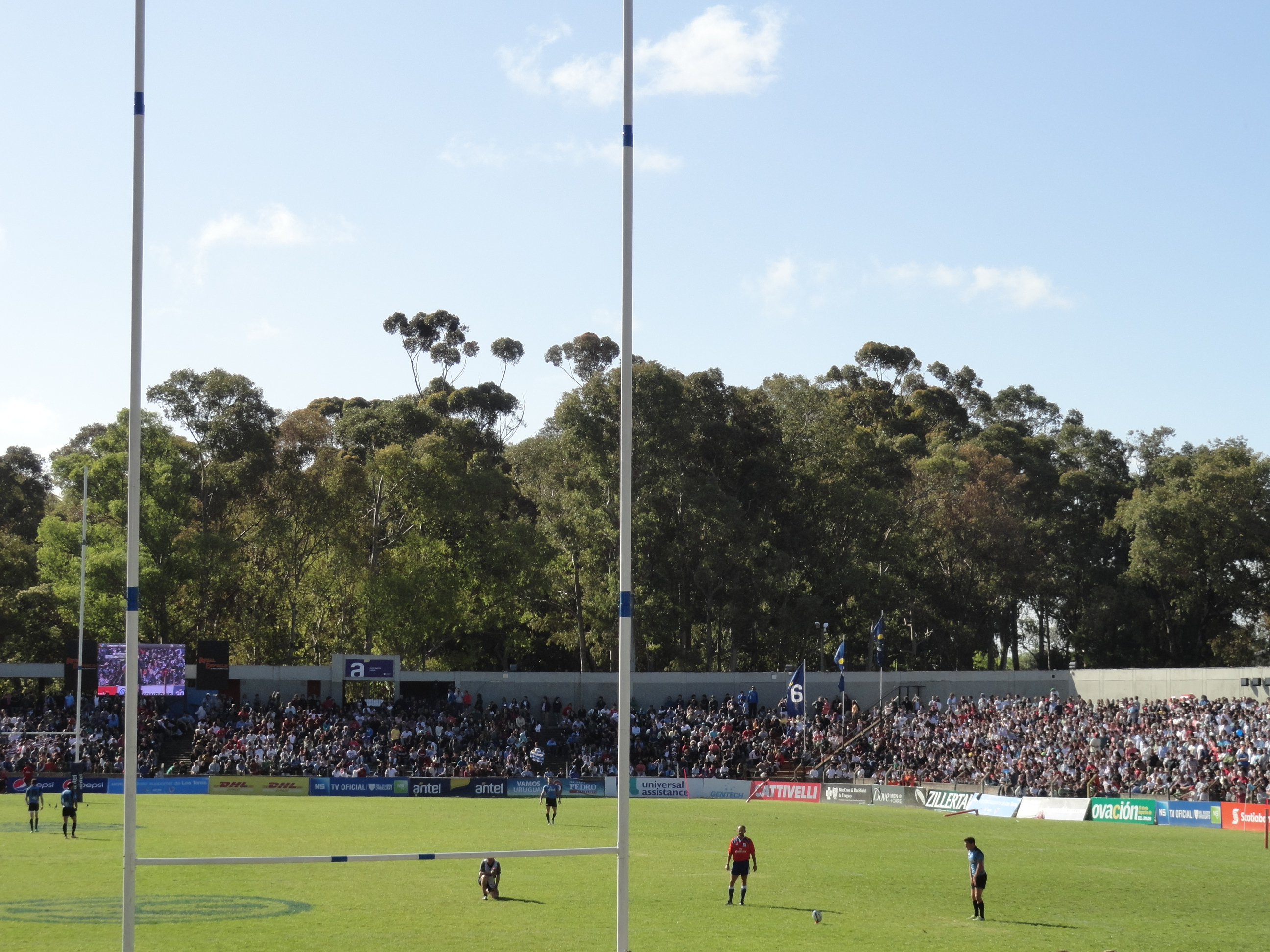
End zone in 2015

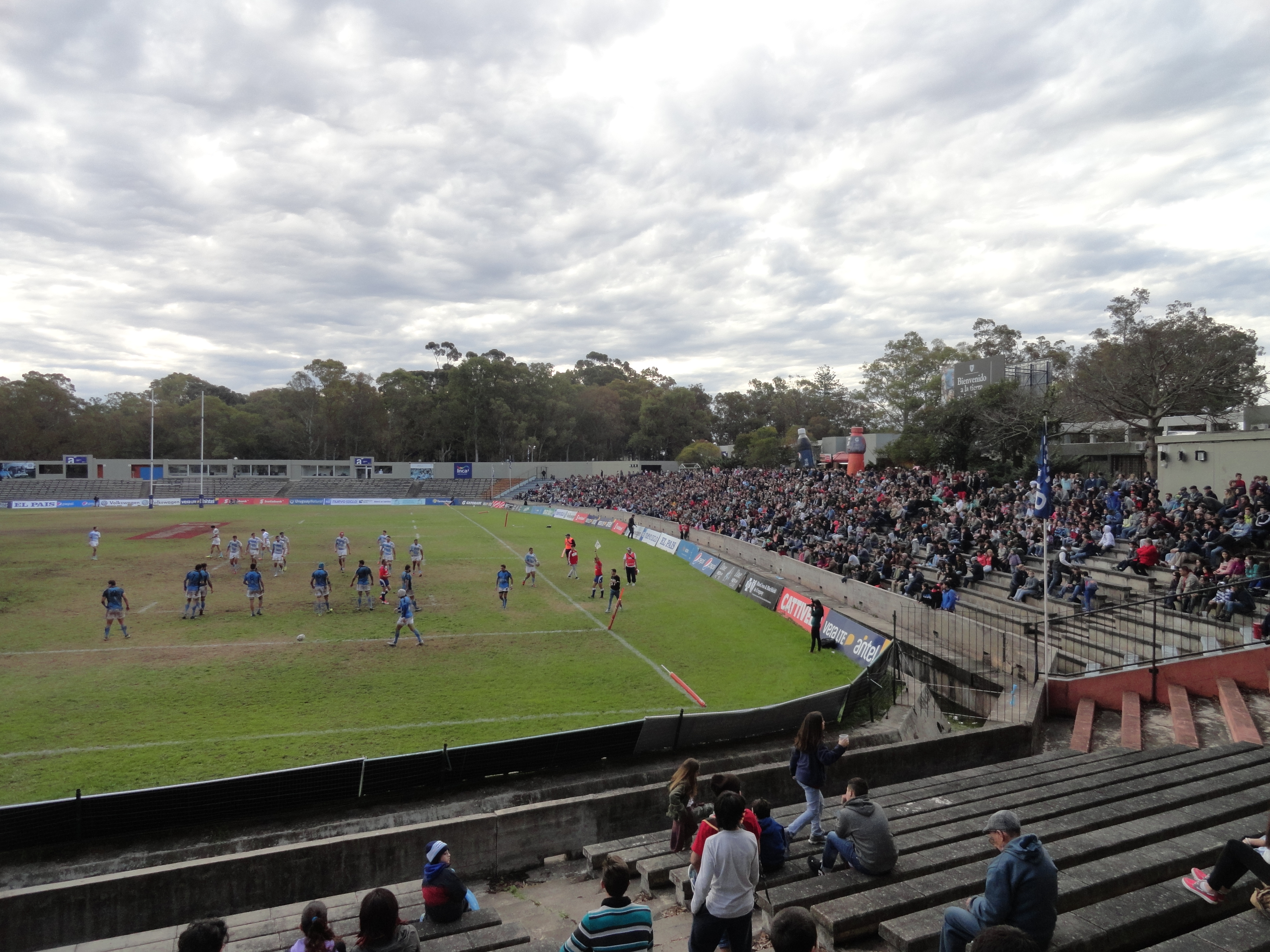
Uruguay v Argentina rugby, 2015

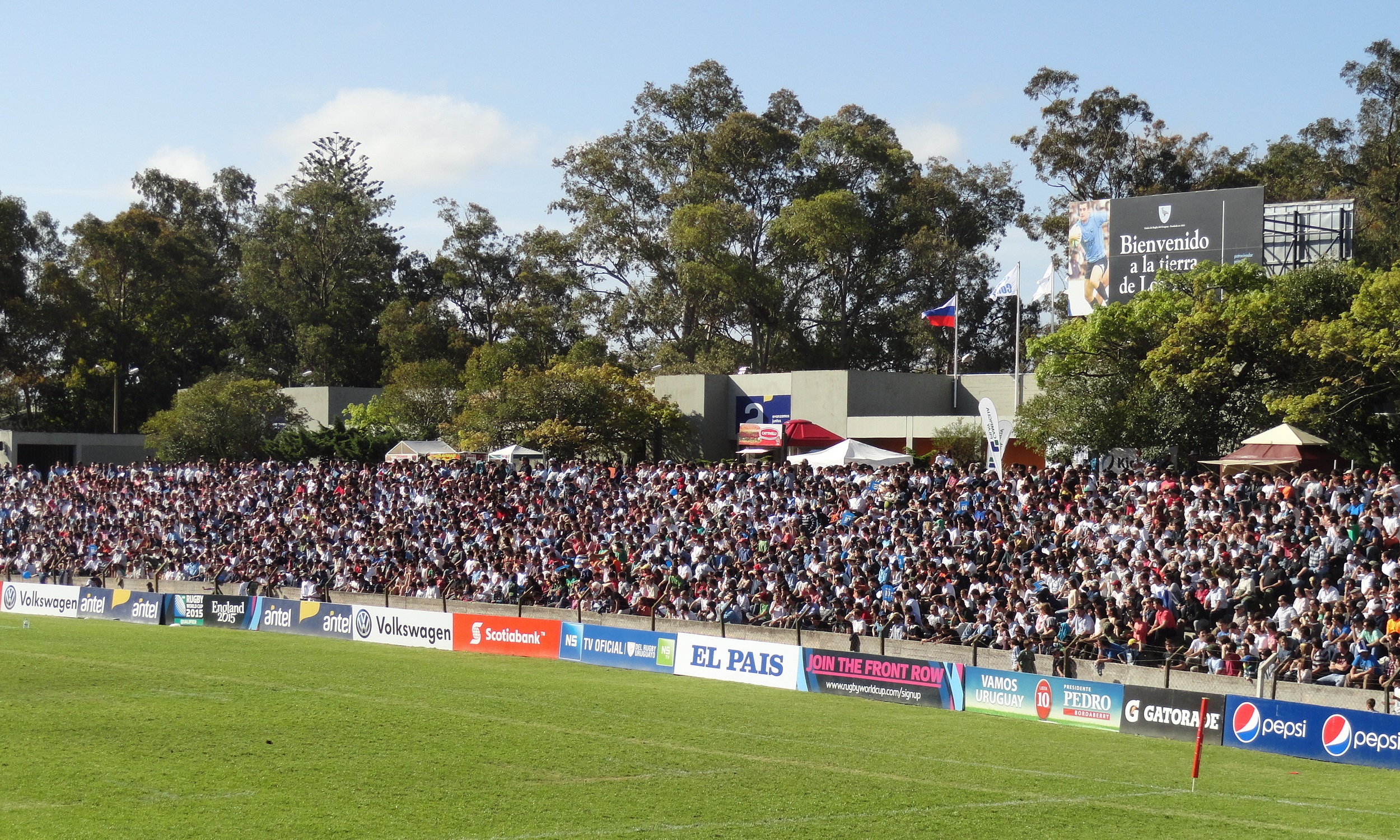
The crowd during a rugby match in 2015

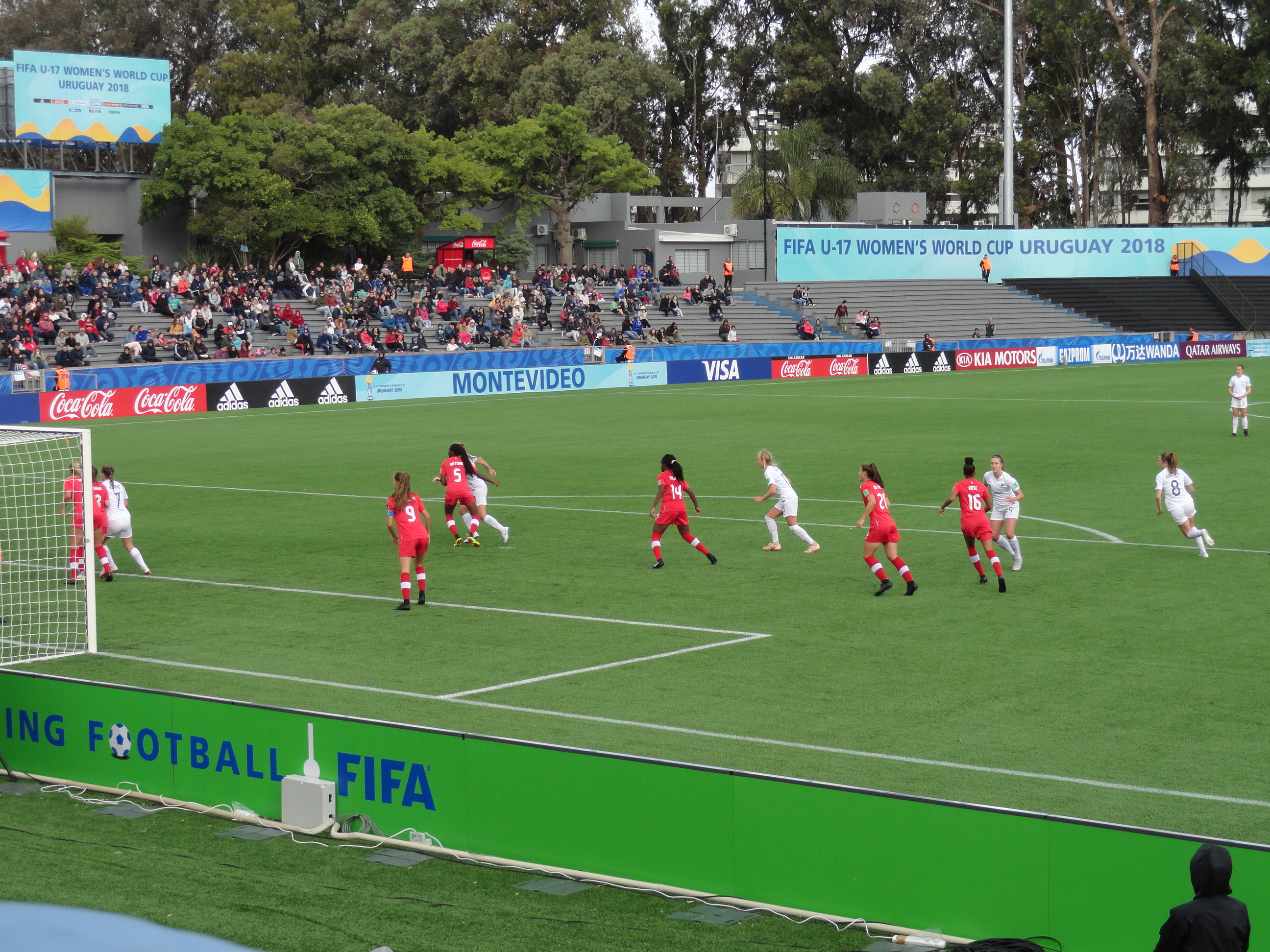
FIFA u17 WC, NZ v Canada

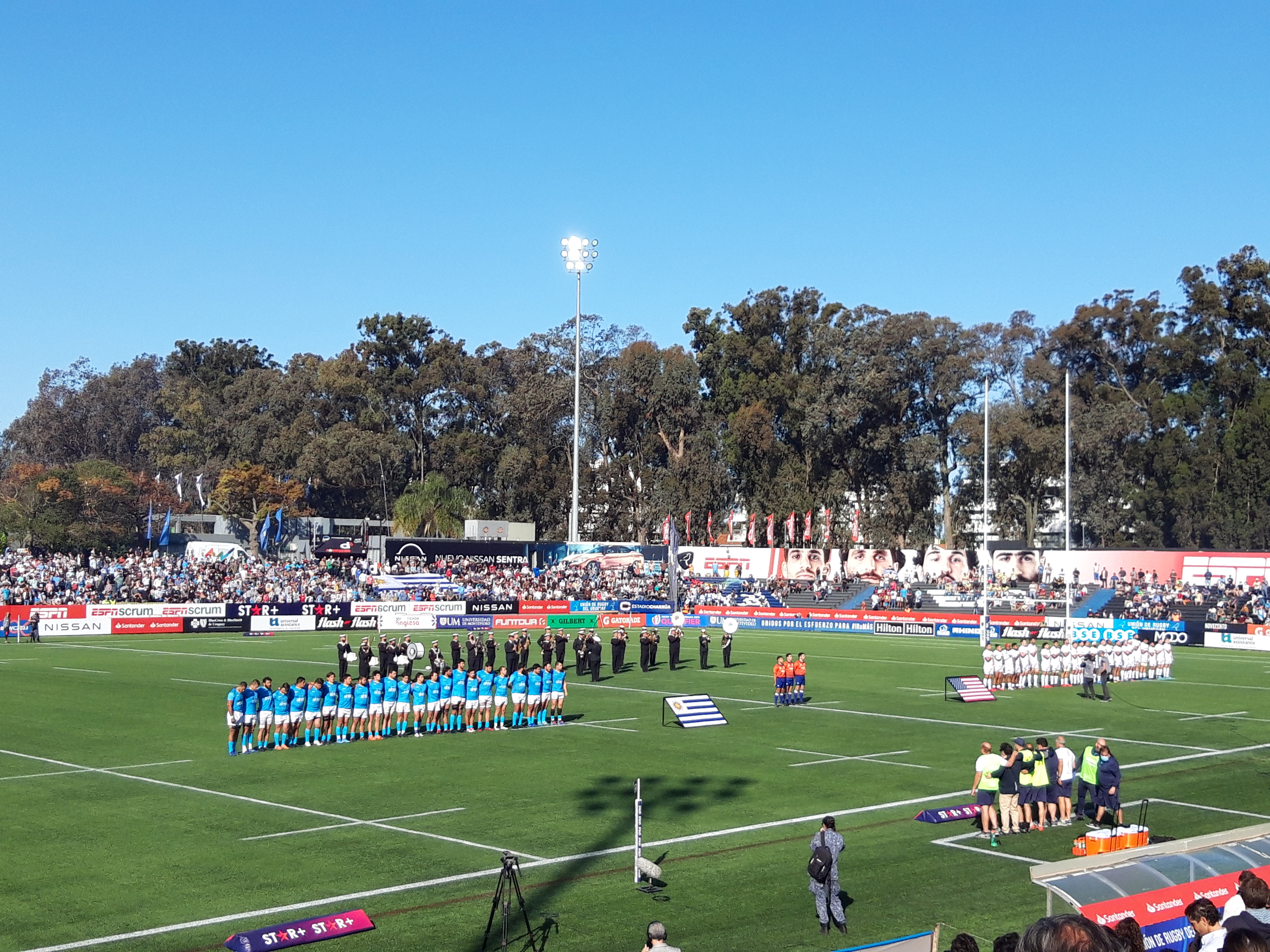
Uruguay v USA rugby, 2021

== See also ==
- List of rugby league stadiums by capacity
- List of rugby union stadiums by capacity

Preceded by International Stadium; Amman	FIFA U-17 Women's World Cup; Final Venue; 2018	Succeeded by DY Patil Stadium; Mumbai
