= Ignacio Silva =

Chilean rugby union player

- Full name: Ignacio Andres Silva Aninat
- Born: 16 February 1989 (age 37) Santiago, Chile
- Height: 1.85 m (6 ft 1 in)
- Weight: 98 kg (216 lb; 15 st 6 lb)

Rugby union career
- Position: Flanker
- Current team: Selknam
Senior career
Years	Team	Apps	(Points)
2020–	Selknam	29	(10)
- Correct as of 28 August 2023
International career
Years	Team	Apps	(Points)
2008–2009	Chile U20	6	(5)
2010–	Chile	38	(15)
2016–2020	Chile A	10	(5)
- Correct as of 28 August 2023
National sevens team
Years	Team		Comps
2017–2019	Chile		8
- Correct as of 28 August 2023

Ignacio Andres Silva Aninat (born 16 February 1989) is a Chilean professional rugby union player who plays as a flanker for Super Rugby Americas club Selknam and the Chile national team.
