= Peñarol Rugby =

Uruguayan rugby union club, based in Montevideo

(Uruguay) Peñarol
- Full name: Club Atlético Peñarol de Rugby
- Nickname: Carbonero
- Founded: 2019; 7 years ago
- Location: Montevideo, Uruguay
- Ground: Estadio Charrúa (Capacity: 14,000)
- President: Evaristo González
- Coach: Ivo Dugonjic
- Captain: Felipe Aliaga
- League: Super Rugby Americas
- 2025: 4th Playoffs: Champions
1st kit	2nd kit

Official website
- peñarol.org/rugby

Peñarol is a Uruguayan professional rugby union team based in Montevideo. The team was founded in 2019 to compete in Súper Liga Americana de Rugby and is the rugby section of the Peñarol sports club. With its participation, Peñarol became the first professional rugby club in Uruguay.

Peñarol debuted officially in March 2020, v Chilean team Selknam, which also takes part of Súper Liga Americana. The Carbonero was defeated 15–13.

== Stadium ==
Their home stadium is Estadio Charrúa in Montevideo and holds up to 14,000 people.

== Current squad ==
The Peñarol Rugby squad for the 2026 Super Rugby Americas season is:

2026 Peñarol squad
**Props**: (Uruguay) Juan Francisco Besseio; (Uruguay) Sebastián Dalmao; (Canada) **Foster DeWitt**; (Argentina) Agustin Iglesias; (Uruguay) **Mateo Perillo**; (Argentina) Jesús Porro; (Uruguay) **Francisco Suárez**; **Hookers**: (Uruguay) **Joaquín Myzska**; (Uruguay) Sebastián Pérez; (Uruguay) Darío Rodríguez; **Locks**: (Uruguay) **Felipe Aliaga** **(c)**; (Uruguay) Bautista Cat; (Uruguay) Guillermo Curuchet; (Uruguay) Nicolás Mattson; (Uruguay) **Manuel Rosmarino**	**Back row**: (Uruguay) **Manuel Ardao**; (Uruguay) **Lucas Bianchi**; (Uruguay) **Manuel Diana**; (Canada) **Ethan Fryer**; (Uruguay) Ignacio Merli; (Uruguay) Manuel Ponte; (Uruguay) Alex Sonnerveld; (Uruguay) Pedro Suárez; **Scrum-halves**: (Uruguay) Francisco Lawlor; (Argentina) Alejandro Molinas; **Fly-halves**: (Uruguay) **Ícaro Amarillo**; (Uruguay) **Justo Ferrario**	**Centres**: (Uruguay) Mateo Acosta; (Uruguay) **Juan Manuel Alonso**; (Canada) **Noah Flesch**; (Uruguay) Joaquín Fresnedo; (Uruguay) **Alfonso Perillo**; (Uruguay) **Joaquín Suárez**; **Wings**: (Argentina) Tomás Baca Castex; (Uruguay) **Ignacio Facciolo**; (Argentina) Santiago Marolda; (Uruguay) Juan Francisco Pereira; **Fullbacks**: (Uruguay) Nicolás Pittaluga; (Canada) James Thiel
**(c)** denotes the team captain. **Bold** denotes internationally capped players. * denotes players qualified to play for Uruguay on residency or dual nationality. Source:

== Honours ==
- Super Rugby Americas (3): 2022, 2023, 2025
- Desafío de Campeones de América y Europa (1): 2023
