= 2026 Australia rugby union tour of Argentina =

- Date: 29 August – 5 September 2026
- Coach: Les Kiss
- Tour captains: Harry Wilson (Note: Although Harry Wilson is the team captain, Allan Alaalatoa was named captain for the first test. Wilson retained the captaincy for the second test.); Allan Alaalatoa
- Test series winners: Australia (1–0)
- Top test point scorer: Ryan Lonergan (13)
- Top test try scorer: Fraser McReight (2)
Summary
P	W	D	L
Total
2	1	1	0
Test match
2	1	1	0
Opponent
P	W	D	L
Argentina
2	1	1	0

Tour chronology
- ← Japan 2026

In August and September 2026, the Australia national rugby union team toured Argentina for a two-test series. The tour formed part of a broader restructuring of the Rugby Championship, the Southern Hemisphere men's rugby union competition organised by SANZAAR, which features the national teams of Argentina, Australia, New Zealand and South Africa. Under its new format, the competition, which was played annually from its 1996 edition, was dropped for 2026 and 2030 to make way for the 2026 and 2030 New Zealand/South Africa tours.

It was the first Australian tour of Argentina since 1997, and the first sole Australian tour of Argentina since 1987. The two teams contested the Puma Trophy, for which the hosts, Argentina, were the holders, having held the trophy since 2023. Following a 28-all draw in the second test, Australia reclaimed the trophy.

The initial fixtures were reported by La Nación in October 2025 before being confirmed by Rugby Australia in November.

Australia won the series 1–0 following a draw in the second test. It was their first series win in Argentina.

== Background ==
Since the advent of professionalism in rugby union in the mid-1990s, the traditional touring practice among the Southern Hemisphere teams (Australia, New Zealand, and South Africa) was largely abandoned. Once a regular feature of the international calendar, reciprocal tours between these nations were replaced by the annual competition known as the Tri Nations Series. Under this format, each team faced the others twice per season, once at home and once away, with the side accumulating the most points crowned champions. In 2012, Argentina was admitted to the competition, with the competition formally rebranding to the Rugby Championship. Prior to Argentina's inclusion, the three founding teams had toured the country on multiple occasions (Australia and South Africa three times each, and New Zealand twice). However, following Argentina's integration into the expanded competition, the annual round-robin format became the primary means for Southern Hemisphere international fixtures. The Puma Trophy, a trophy contested between Argentina and Australia since 2000, became regularly up for grabs.

In 2025, the South African Rugby Union (SARU) and New Zealand Rugby (NZR), two participants of the Rugby Championship, confirmed that they would undertake traditional mutual tours for 2026 and 2030. This essentially axed the tournament for those years, although it was confirmed to still take place in the remaining years.

Previously held tournament obligations between Argentina and Australia, which involved one team hosting both tests against the other (colloquially known as "mini tours"), still stood, and were confirmed to go ahead for 2026. Australia's schedule for the year was released in late 2025, confirming the two-test tour which would now stand alone as its own series. It would be Australia's first tour of the country since 1997.

=== History ===
Prior to the 2026 tour, Australia's record in Argentina since the latter's inclusion in the Rugby Championship stood at seven wins, three losses. This included 11 consecutive defences of the Puma Trophy. At the same time, Argentina had won three on Australian soil, lost nine, with two being drawn. Beginning in 2023, however, Argentina claimed the Puma Trophy for the first time, sealing a narrow victory on foreign soil with a decisive late try. The following year, they retained the Puma Trophy after defeating Australia in their second home test, securing their largest-ever victory over the Wallabies. Argentina prevailed by a margin of 40 points, amassing 67 points in total. And for a third successive year, Argentina retained the trophy again after winning one of two tests in Australia in the 2025 Rugby Championship.

== Schedule ==
Date	Venue	Home	Score	Away
29 August	Estadio 23 de Agosto, Jujuy	Argentina	21–27	Australia
5 September	Estadio Malvinas Argentinas, Mendoza	Argentina	28–28	Australia

== Venues ==
The two venues (Estadio Malvinas Argentinas, Estadio 23 de Agosto) were confirmed by the Argentine Rugby Union (UAR) in January 2026. While the two teams have never met in Jujuy, which itself has only hosted two international matches (2017, 2022), Argentina and Australia have met four times in Mendoza. The first was in the 2014 Rugby Championship, which saw the former achieve their first win over Australia in the competition, the most recent was in the 2022 edition.

Mendoza	Test series venues: 1 Estadio 23 de Agosto; 2 Estadio Malvinas Argentinas
Estadio Malvinas Argentinas	Test series venues: 1 Estadio 23 de Agosto; 2 Estadio Malvinas Argentinas
Capacity: 42,000	Test series venues: 1 Estadio 23 de Agosto; 2 Estadio Malvinas Argentinas
San Salvador de Jujuy	Test series venues: 1 Estadio 23 de Agosto; 2 Estadio Malvinas Argentinas
Estadio 23 de Agosto	Test series venues: 1 Estadio 23 de Agosto; 2 Estadio Malvinas Argentinas
Capacity: 25,000	Test series venues: 1 Estadio 23 de Agosto; 2 Estadio Malvinas Argentinas

== Squads ==
Caps and ages are as of the first match of the tour (29 August 2026).

=== Australia ===
On 19 August 2026, Australia named a 34-man squad for their tour of Argentina.

On 28 August, ahead of the first test, Dylan Pietsch was returned home with injury, and was replaced by Jock Campbell.

Head Coach: Les Kiss

Player	Position	Date of birth (age)	Caps	Club/province
Josh Nasser	Hooker	23 June 1999 (aged 27)	15	(Australia) Reds
Brandon Paenga-Amosa	Hooker	25 December 1995 (aged 30)	29	(Australia) Force
Billy Pollard	Hooker	9 December 2001 (aged 24)	22	(Australia) Brumbies
Isaac Aedo Kailea	Prop	13 July 2000 (aged 26)	8	(Australia) Waratahs
Allan Alaalatoa (c)	Prop	28 January 1994 (aged 32)	92	(Australia) Brumbies
Angus Bell	Prop	4 October 2000 (aged 25)	55	(Australia) Waratahs
Massimo de Lutiis	Prop	18 November 2003 (aged 22)	1	(Australia) Reds
Aidan Ross	Prop	25 October 1995 (aged 30)	5	(Australia) Reds
Taniela Tupou	Prop	10 May 1996 (aged 30)	72	(France) Racing 92
Josh Canham	Lock	1 February 2001 (aged 25)	6	(Australia) Reds
Lukhan Salakaia-Loto	Lock	19 September 1996 (aged 29)	46	(Australia) Reds
Lachlan Shaw	Lock	15 May 2003 (aged 23)	3	(Australia) Brumbies
Jeremy Williams	Lock	2 December 2000 (aged 25)	30	(Australia) Force
Charlie Cale	Back row	6 October 2000 (aged 25)	4	(Australia) Brumbies
Tom Hooper	Back row	29 January 2001 (aged 25)	23	(England) Exeter Chiefs
Fraser McReight	Back row	19 February 1999 (aged 27)	44	(Australia) Reds
Carlo Tizzano	Back row	2 February 2000 (aged 26)	16	(Australia) Force
Rob Valetini	Back row	3 September 1998 (aged 27)	66	(Australia) Brumbies
Harry Wilson (c)	Back row	22 November 1999 (aged 26)	41	(Australia) Reds
Ryan Lonergan	Scrum-half	6 April 1998 (aged 28)	10	(Australia) Brumbies
Tate McDermott	Scrum-half	18 September 1998 (aged 27)	55	(Australia) Reds
Kalani Thomas	Scrum-half	18 April 2002 (aged 24)	1	(Australia) Reds
Ben Donaldson	Fly-half	4 April 1999 (aged 27)	23	(Australia) Force
Carter Gordon	Fly-half	29 January 2001 (aged 25)	11	(Australia) Reds
Declan Meredith	Fly-half	28 June 1999 (aged 27)	3	(Australia) Brumbies
Isaac Henry	Centre	8 March 1999 (aged 27)	2	(Australia) Reds
Len Ikitau	Centre	1 October 1998 (aged 27)	53	(Australia) Brumbies
Hunter Paisami	Centre	10 April 1999 (aged 27)	37	(Australia) Reds
Joseph-Aukuso Sua'ali'i	Centre	1 August 2003 (aged 23)	22	(Australia) Waratahs
Filipo Daugunu	Wing	4 March 1995 (aged 31)	23	(Australia) Reds
Max Jorgensen	Wing	2 September 2004 (aged 21)	25	(Australia) Waratahs
Dylan Pietsch	Wing	23 April 1998 (aged 28)	11	(Australia) Force
Harry Potter	Wing	15 December 1997 (aged 28)	14	(Australia) Waratahs
Jock Campbell	Fullback	17 May 1995 (aged 31)	6	(Australia) Reds
Tom Wright	Fullback	21 July 1997 (aged 29)	48	(Australia) Brumbies

=== Argentina ===
On 17 August, Argentina named a 36-player squad ahead of their two-test series against Australia.

Head coach: Felipe Contepomi

Player	Position	Date of birth (age)	Caps	Club/province
Leonel Oviedo	Hooker	16 February 1998 (aged 28)	1	(Australia) Western Force
Ignacio Ruiz	Hooker	3 January 2001 (aged 25)	31	(France) Perpignan
Martín Vaca	Hooker	2 June 2001 (aged 25)	0	(Argentina) Capibaras XV
Pedro Delgado	Prop	1 September 1997 (aged 28)	11	(England) Harlequins
Rodrigo Martínez	Prop	7 July 1998 (aged 28)	3	(Wales) Dragons
Francisco Moreno	Prop	31 January 2002 (aged 24)	1	(Argentina) Tarucas
Tomas Rapetti	Prop	4 March 2005 (aged 21)	7	(France) Toulouse
Mayco Vivas	Prop	2 June 1998 (aged 28)	43	(France) Oyonnax
Boris Wenger	Prop	1 July 2002 (aged 24)	9	(England) Harlequins
Efraín Elías	Lock	30 April 2004 (aged 22)	4	(France) Toulouse
Tomás Lavanini	Lock	22 January 1993 (aged 33)	92	(New Zealand) Highlanders
Franco Molina	Lock	28 August 1997 (aged 29)	21	(England) Newcastle Red Bulls
Guido Petti	Lock	17 November 1994 (aged 31)	102	(England) Harlequins
Facundo Cardozo	Back row	6 April 1995 (aged 31)	0	(Argentina) Tarucas
Benjamín Grondona	Back row	19 October 2003 (aged 22)	3	(England) Bristol Bears
Pablo Matera (c)	Back row	18 July 1993 (aged 33)	125	(Japan) Tochigi Honda Heat
Joaquín Moro	Back row	24 January 2001 (aged 25)	6	(England) Leicester Tigers
Juan Penoucos	Back row	29 June 2004 (aged 22)	1	(Argentina) Pampas XV
Agustín Sarelli	Back row	27 October 2004 (aged 21)	0	(Argentina) Tarucas
Juan Martín Scelzo	Back row	12 February 2002 (aged 24)	1	(France) Stade Français Paris
Simon Benitez Cruz	Scrum-half	6 September 1999 (aged 26)	13	(England) Newcastle Red Bulls
Gonzalo Bertranou	Scrum-half	31 December 1993 (aged 32)	68	(United States) California Legion
Agustín Moyano	Scrum-half	12 June 2001 (aged 25)	10	(Australia) Western Force
Gerónimo Prisciantelli	Fly-half	23 August 1999 (aged 27)	5	(France) Racing 92
Nicolás Roger	Fly-half	11 January 2000 (aged 26)	3	(Argentina) Dogos XV
Lucio Cinti	Centre	23 February 2000 (aged 26)	43	(England) Saracens
Agustín Fraga	Centre	6 March 2002 (aged 24)	0	(Argentina) Pampas XV
Matías Moroni	Centre	29 March 1991 (aged 35)	98	(England) Bristol Bears
Benjamín Ordiz	Centre	9 August 2006 (aged 20)	0	(Argentina) Capibaras XV
Faustino Sánchez Valarolo	Centre	8 July 2004 (aged 22)	3	(Argentina) Dogos XV
Rodrigo Isgró	Wing	23 March 1999 (aged 27)	18	(England) Harlequins
Ignacio Mendy	Wing	29 June 2000 (aged 26)	6	(Italy) Benetton
Santiago Pernas	Wing	11 August 2003 (aged 23)	1	(Argentina) Pampas XV
Santiago Carreras	Fullback	30 March 1998 (aged 28)	69	(England) Bath
Mateo Soler	Fullback	20 May 2003 (aged 23)	0	(Argentina) Dogos XV
Tobías Wade	Fullback	6 August 1999 (aged 27)	0	(Argentina) Pampas XV

== Test series ==
=== First test ===
29 August 2026
16:00 ART (UTC–03)

Argentina	21–27	Australia
Try: Prisciantelli 13' c Moro 36' c Wenger 51' c Con: Carreras (3/3) 14', 37', 51'	Report	Try: Paenga-Amosa 6' m Gordon 10' c McReight 19' c Hooper 54' m Con: Lonergan (2/3) 11', 20'; Pen: Lonergan (1/1) 40+1'

Estadio 23 de Agosto, San Salvador de Jujuy
Attendance: 22,904
Referee: Ben O'Keeffe (New Zealand)

Argentina	Australia

FB	15	Gerónimo Prisciantelli	(substituted off) 67'
RW	14	Rodrigo Isgró
OC	13	Lucio Cinti
IC	12	Faustino Sánchez Valarolo	(substituted off) 61'
LW	11	Ignacio Mendy
FH	10	Santiago Carreras
SH	9	Simón Benítez Cruz	(substituted off) 61'
N8	8	Joaquín Moro
BF	7	Benjamín Grondona	(substituted off) 55'
OF	6	Pablo Matera (c)
RL	5	Tomás Lavanini	(substituted off) 40'
LL	4	Guido Petti
TP	3	Francisco Moreno	(substituted off) 47'
HK	2	Ignacio Ruiz	(substituted off) 67'
LP	1	Boris Wenger	(substituted off) 55'
Substitutions:
HK	16	Leonel Oviedo	(substituted on) 67'
PR	17	Rodrigo Martínez	(substituted on) 55'
PR	18	Tomas Rapetti	(substituted on) 47'
LK	19	Efraín Elías	(substituted on) 40'
BR	20	Juan Penoucos	(substituted on) 55'
SH	21	Agustín Moyano	(substituted on) 61'
FH	22	Nicolás Roger	(substituted on) 67'
CE	23	Matías Moroni	(substituted on) 61'
Coach:
Felipe Contepomi

FB	15	Tom Wright
RW	14	Max Jorgensen
OC	13	Isaac Henry		(substituted off) 65'
IC	12	Hunter Paisami
LW	11	Harry Potter	(yellow card) 24'
FH	10	Carter Gordon		(substituted off) 54'	(substituted on) 64'
SH	9	Ryan Lonergan		(substituted off) 44'
N8	8	Rob Valetini		(substituted off) 71'
OF	7	Fraser McReight
BF	6	Tom Hooper
RL	5	Jeremy Williams
LL	4	Josh Canham		(substituted off) 59'
TP	3	Allan Alaalatoa (c)		(substituted off) 50'
HK	2	Brandon Paenga-Amosa		(substituted off) 50'
LP	1	Isaac Aedo Kailea		(substituted off) 40'
Substitutions:
HK	16	Billy Pollard		(substituted on) 50'
PR	17	Angus Bell		(substituted on) 40'
PR	18	Massimo de Lutiis		(substituted on) 50'
LK	19	Lachlan Shaw		(substituted on) 59'
BR	20	Charlie Cale		(substituted on) 71'
SH	21	Tate McDermott		(substituted on) 44'
FH	22	Ben Donaldson		(substituted on) 54'	(substituted off) 64'
CE	23	Joseph-Aukuso Sua'ali'i		(substituted on) 65'
Coach:
Les Kiss

Player of the Match:
Fraser McReight (Australia)

Assistant referees:
James Doleman (New Zealand)
Gianluca Gnecchi (Italy)
Television match official:
Richard Kelly (New Zealand)
Foul play review officer:
Glenn Newman (New Zealand)

=== Second test ===
5 September 2026
18:00 ART (UTC−03)

Argentina	28–28	Australia
Try: Matera (2) 35' c, 63' c Mendy 38' c Ruiz 54' c Con: Carreras (4/4) 35', 39', 54', 64'	Report	Try: Wilson 19' c Jorgensen 27' c McReight 46' c Penalty try 69'; Con: Lonergan (3/3) 20', 28', 47'

Estadio Malvinas Argentinas, Mendoza
Referee: James Doleman (New Zealand)

Argentina	Australia

FB	15	Santiago Carreras	(yellow card) 69'
RW	14	Rodrigo Isgró
OC	13	Lucio Cinti	(yellow card) 68'
IC	12	Faustino Sánchez Valarolo
LW	11	Ignacio Mendy		(substituted off) 75'
FH	10	Nicolás Roger
SH	9	Simón Benítez Cruz		(substituted off) 70'
N8	8	Joaquín Moro		(substituted off) 52'
BF	7	Guido Petti		(substituted off) 75'
OF	6	Pablo Matera (c)
RL	5	Franco Molina	(yellow card) 26'	(substituted off) 67'
LL	4	Efraín Elías
TP	3	Pedro Delgado		(substituted off) 52'
HK	2	Ignacio Ruiz		(substituted off) 70'
LP	1	Boris Wenger		(substituted off) 52'
Substitutions:
HK	16	Leonel Oviedo		(substituted on) 70'
PR	17	Mayco Vivas		(substituted on) 52'
PR	18	Francisco Moreno		(substituted on) 52'
LK	19	Tomás Lavanini		(substituted on) 67'
BR	20	Juan Martín Scelzo		(substituted on) 52'
BR	21	Facundo Cardozo		(substituted on) 75'
SH	22	Gonzalo Bertranou		(substituted on) 70'
WG	23	Mateo Soler		(substituted on) 75'
Coach:
Felipe Contepomi

FB	15	Tom Wright
RW	14	Max Jorgensen
OC	13	Joseph-Aukuso Sua'ali'i
IC	12	Len Ikitau
LW	11	Filipo Daugunu		(substituted off) 14'	(substituted on) 29'	(substituted off) 74'
FH	10	Ben Donaldson				(substituted off) 55'
SH	9	Ryan Lonergan
N8	8	Harry Wilson (c)
OF	7	Fraser McReight
BF	6	Rob Valetini		(substituted off) 65'
RL	5	Jeremy Williams	(yellow card) 33'	(substituted off) 60'
LL	4	Josh Canham
TP	3	Taniela Tupou		(substituted off) 51'
HK	2	Billy Pollard		(substituted off) 51'
LP	1	Angus Bell		(substituted off) 58'
Substitutions:
HK	16	Josh Nasser		(substituted on) 51'
PR	17	Aidan Ross		(substituted on) 58'
PR	18	Massimo de Lutiis		(substituted on) 51'
LK	19	Lukhan Salakaia-Loto		(substituted on) 60'
BR	20	Charlie Cale		(substituted on) 65'
SH	21	Kalani Thomas					(substituted on) 69'
FH	22	Carter Gordon		(substituted on) 14'	(substituted off) 29'	(substituted on) 55'	(substituted off) 69'
CE	23	Isaac Henry				(substituted on) 74'
Coach:
Les Kiss

Assistant referees:
Ben O'Keeffe (New Zealand)
Gianluca Gnecchi (Italy)
Television match official:
Glenn Newman (New Zealand)
Foul play review officer:
Richard Kelly (New Zealand)

Notes:

- Facundo Cardozo and Mateo Soler (both Argentina) made their international test debuts.
- Tom Wright (Australia) earned his 50th test cap.
- With this draw, Australia won the series 1–0, securing their first series victory in Argentina.
- Australia reclaimed the Puma Trophy.

== Statistics ==
=== Points scorers ===
Pos.	Player	Team	Pts.
1	Santiago Carreras	Argentina	14
2	Ryan Lonergan	Australia	13
3	Pablo Matera	Argentina	10
3	Fraser McReight	Australia	10
5	Carter Gordon	Australia	5
5	Tom Hooper	Australia	5
5	Max Jorgensen	Australia	5
5	Ignacio Mendy	Argentina	5
5	Joaquín Moro	Argentina	5
5	Brandon Paenga-Amosa	Australia	5
5	Penalty try (for Australia)		5
5	Gerónimo Prisciantelli	Argentina	5
5	Ignacio Ruiz	Argentina	5
5	Boris Wenger	Argentina	5
5	Harry Wilson	Australia	5

=== Try scorers ===
Pos.	Player	Team	Tries
1	Pablo Matera	Argentina	2
1	Fraser McReight	Australia	2
3	Carter Gordon	Australia	1
3	Tom Hooper	Australia	1
3	Max Jorgensen	Australia	1
3	Ignacio Mendy	Argentina	1
3	Joaquín Moro	Argentina	1
3	Brandon Paenga-Amosa	Australia	1
3	Penalty try (for Australia)		1
3	Gerónimo Prisciantelli	Argentina	1
3	Ignacio Ruiz	Argentina	1
3	Boris Wenger	Argentina	1
3	Harry Wilson	Australia	1

== See also ==
- History of rugby union matches between Argentina and Australia
- 2026 New Zealand tour of South Africa
- 2026 men's rugby union internationals
