= Facundo Cardozo (rugby union) =

Argentine rugby union player (born 2001)

- Full name: Facundo Javier Cardozo
- Born: 4 May 2001 (age 25) Argentina
- Height: 186 cm (6 ft 1 in)
- Weight: 91 kg (201 lb; 14 st 5 lb)

Rugby union career
- Position: Flanker
- Current team: Tarucas
Senior career
Years	Team	Apps	(Points)
2024	Dogos XV		
2025–	Tarucas		
- Correct as of 27 September 2026
International career
Years	Team	Apps	(Points)
2025	Argentina XV	1	(5)
2026–	Argentina	1	(0)
- Correct as of 27 September 2026

Facundo Cardozo (born 4 May 2001) is an Argentine rugby union player, who plays for Tarucas. His preferred position is flanker.

== Early career ==
Cardozo is from Mendoza Province in Argentina, and played his club rugby for Teqüe Rugby Club, helping them win the second division in 2023. Having moved to the Tucumán region, he joined Universitario Rugby Club de Tucumán for his club rugby.

== Professional career ==
Cardozo signed professionally with Dogos XV ahead of the 2024 Super Rugby Americas season, helping the side win the title that season. For the 2025 season he transferred to Tarucas, and remained with the side for the 2026 Super Rugby Americas season.

Cardozo was named in the Argentina XV squad for their fixture against Romania in 2025. In July 2026, Cardozo was named in the Argentina squad for their upcoming tests as a training player. He made his debut on 5 September against Australia, coming on as a replacement.
