= Francisco Moreno (rugby union) =

- Born: 31 January 2002 (age 24) Tucumán, Argentina
- Height: 185 cm (6 ft 1 in)
- Weight: 143 kg (315 lb; 22 st 7 lb)

Rugby union career
- Position: Prop
- Current team: Tarucas
Youth career
- –2017: Lince
Amateur team(s)
Years	Team	Apps	(Points)
2017–2026	Universitario		
Senior career
Years	Team	Apps	(Points)
2024	Cobras Brasil	12	(0)
2025–2026	Tarucas	15	(0)
2026–	Newcastle Red Bulls	0	(0)
- Correct as of 28 August 2026
International career
Years	Team	Apps	(Points)
2025	Argentina XV	1	(0)
2026–	Argentina	1	(0)
- Correct as of 28 August 2026

Francisco Moreno (born 31 January 2002) is a professional Argentine rugby union player who currently plays as a prop for Premiership club Newcastle Red Bulls and the Argentina national team.

== Early life ==
Moreno was born in Tucumán Province, Argentina in 2002.

== Career ==
Moreno began his youth career playing club rugby with Lince in Tucumán Province. He later joined Universitario.

In 2024, Moreno was the starting prop for Cobras Brasil in the Super Rugby Americas competition. He played in all twelve of their games during the 2024 season in which they finished bottom of the ladder. The following season, Moreno had joined the new expansion team, Tarucas, in his home province of Tucumán. He played fifteen games for the team across two seasons.

In August 2026, having played all his rugby in South America, Moreno was announced as the latest signing of the Newcastle Red Bulls in the English Premiership. He signed a one-year deal.

== International career ==
In mid-2025, Moreno was called-up to the Argentina XV squad for their one-off match against Romania in Buenos Aires during the 2025 International window.

In August 2026, Moreno was called-up to the Argentina squad ahead of their three Test matches during the August–September International window. He made his Test debut against South Africa on 8 August 2026 at the José Amalfitani Stadium. Starting at tighthead prop, Argentina lost in a close contest 10–17. Moreno was later announced as the starting tighthead prop again in their follow up Test against Australia during the 2026 Australia tour of Argentina.
