= 2020 Súper Liga Americana de Rugby season =

2020 Súper Liga Americana de Rugby
- Countries: Argentina; Brazil; Chile; Paraguay; Uruguay; Colombia
- Date: 4 March – 29 May
- Matches played: 3

The 2020 Súper Liga Americana de Rugby season was the inaugural season of Súper Liga Americana de Rugby, an annual rugby union competition sanctioned by Sudamérica Rugby. The competition began on 4 March and was scheduled to end on 29 May.

On 17 March 2020, the league was suspended until 2021, effectively ending this season after two rounds of play due to the COVID-19 pandemic in South America.

== Teams ==
Location of teams of the 2020 Superliga Americana de Rugby.
Full participant
Postseason only participant

Team	City	Stadium	Capacity	Coach	Captain
(Argentina) Ceibos	Córdoba	Tala Rugby Club	6,000	(Argentina) Ignacio Fernández Lobbe	(Argentina) Lautaro Bavaro
(Brazil) Corinthians	Santo André	Estádio Bruno José Daniel	11,440	(Brazil) Fernando Portugal	(Brazil) Arthur Bergo
(Chile) Selknam	Santiago	Estadio Nacional	40,000	(Uruguay) Pablo Lemoine	(Chile) Ignacio Silva
(Colombia) Cafeteros Pro	Medellín	TBA	TBA	(Colombia) David Jaramillo	TBA
(Paraguay) Olimpia Lions	Asunción	Estadio Héroes de Curupayty	3,000	(Argentina) Raúl Pérez	(Argentina) Gabriel Ascárate
(Uruguay) Peñarol	Montevideo	Estadio Charrúa	14,000	(Argentina) Pablo Bouza	(Uruguay) Santiago Arata

== Season format ==
Five of the six clubs in the competition competed in the regular season, which was to take place over 10 weeks and would consist of a double round-robin, with each participating club playing 4 matches at home and 4 matches away. The top 4 clubs at the end of the regular season would have moved on to the championship playoffs while the fifth-place club would have progressed to a challenge trophy playoff.

The challenge trophy would have been contested over two matches between the fifth-place regular season club and Cafeteros Pro. Each club would have hosted one match in this series.

The championship would have been contested between the top four regular season clubs in a knockout tournament.

== Regular season ==
The regular season began on 4 March and was scheduled to end on 16 May.

=== Standings ===
Pos	Team	Pld	W	D	L	PF	PA	PD	TF	TA	TB	LB	Pts	Qualification
1	(Argentina) Ceibos	2	2	0	0	80	24	+56	9	1	2	0	10	Championship Playoffs
2	(Chile) Selknam	2	1	0	1	31	45	−14	1	5	0	0	4	Championship Playoffs
3	(Uruguay) Peñarol	1	0	0	1	13	15	−2	1	0	0	1	1	Championship Playoffs
4	(Brazil) Corinthians	0	0	0	0	0	0	0	0	0	0	0	0	Championship Playoffs
5	(Paraguay) Olimpia Lions	1	0	0	1	8	48	−40	1	5	0	0	0	Challenge Trophy

Updated to match(es) played on 14 March 2020. Source:

=== Matches ===
The following were the matches for the 2020 Super Liga Americana de Rugby regular season:

Home \ Away	CEI	COR	OLI	PEN	SEL
(Argentina) Ceibos		~~27 Mar~~	48–8	~~15 May~~	~~24 Apr~~
(Brazil) Corinthians	~~8 May~~		~~24 Apr~~	~~20 Mar~~	~~3 Apr~~
(Paraguay) Olimpia Lions	~~17 Apr~~	~~13 Mar~~		~~27 Mar~~	~~29 Apr~~
(Uruguay) Peñarol	~~3 Apr~~	~~29 Apr~~	~~8 May~~		13–15
(Chile) Selknam	16–32	~~16 May~~	~~21 Mar~~	~~18 Apr~~	

Updated to match(es) played on 7 March 2020. Source:
Legend: Blue = home team win; Yellow = draw; Red = away team win.

==== Week 1 ====
4 Mar	Peñarol (Uruguay)	13–15	(Chile) Selknam	Estadio Charrúa
20:30 UYT	Try: Santiago Arata 10'; Con: Federico Favaro (1/1) 11'; Pen: Federico Favaro (2/5) 5', 67'; Cards: Tomás Inciarte (yellow card) 66'; Nicolás Freitas (yellow card) 69'	Report	Pen: Santiago Videla (5/5) 9', 20', 34', 48', 70'; Patricio Baronio (0/1); Drop: Francisco Urroz (0/1); Cards: Julio Blanc (yellow card) 66'; Patricio Baronio (yellow card) 73'	Attendance: 4,000; Referee: Nehuén Jauri Rivero (UAR) Man of the Match:

6 Mar	Ceibos (Argentina)	48–8	(Paraguay) Olimpia Lions	Tala Rugby Club
21:00 ART	Try: Tomás Cubilla 12′ Juan Bautista Daireaux 21′ Leonel Oviedo 70′ Penalty try 79′ Ignacio Inchauspe 80′ Con: Martín Elías (1/2) 13′ Tomás Albornoz (2/2) 71′, 80′ Pen: Martín Elías (4/5) 26′, 32′, 39′, 55′ Tomás Albornoz (1/1) 59'	Report	Try: Manuel Montero 72′ Con: Damian Stevens (0/1); Pen: Máximo Ledesma 29′ (1/2); Cards: Facundo Pomponio (yellow card) 33'; Facundo Maina (yellow card) 77'	Attendance: 6,000; Referee: Felipe Balbontín (FRC) Man of the Match:

Bye/s: Corinthians

==== Week 2 ====
13 Mar	Olimpia Lions (Paraguay)	Postponed	(Brazil) Corinthians	Estadio Manuel Ferreira
TBA				Referee: Man of the Match:

14 Mar	Selknam (Chile)	16–32	(Argentina) Ceibos	Estadio Nacional Julio Martínez Prádanos
17:00 ART	Try: Penalty try 37'; Pen: Patricio Baronio (3/3) 2', 35', 44'; Cards: Ignacio Silva (yellow card) 50'; Matías Dittus (yellow card) 70'; Vesi Rarawa (yellow card) 72'	Report	Try: Facundo Cordero 26', 57'; Juan Bautista Daireaux 46'; Tomás Cubelli 77'; Con: Martín Elías (1/1) 26'; Tomás Albornoz (2/3) 47', 77'; Pen: Martín Elías (2/2) 7', 28'; Cards: Facundo Corder (yellow card) 37'	Attendance: 4.000; Referee: Man of the Match: Rodrigo Fernández Criado

Bye/s: Peñarol

==== Week 3 ====
20 Mar	Corinthians (Brazil)	v	(Uruguay) Peñarol	Estádio Parque São Jorge
TBA				Referee: Man of the Match:

21 Mar	Selknam (Chile)	v	(Paraguay) Olimpia Lions	TBA
TBA				Referee: Man of the Match:

Bye/s: Ceibos

==== Week 4 ====
27 Mar	Olimpia Lions (Paraguay)	v	(Uruguay) Peñarol	Estadio Héroes de Curupayty
TBA				Referee: Man of the Match:

27 Mar	Ceibos (Argentina)	v	(Brazil) Corinthians	Tala Rugby Club
TBA				Referee: Man of the Match:

Bye/s: Selknam

==== Week 5 ====
3 Apr	Corinthians (Brazil)	v	(Chile) Selknam	Estádio Parque São Jorge
TBA				Referee: Man of the Match:

3 Apr	Peñarol (Uruguay)	v	(Argentina) Ceibos	Estadio Charrúa
TBA				Referee: Man of the Match:

Bye/s: Olimpia Lions

==== Week 6 ====
17 Apr	Olimpia Lions (Paraguay)	v	(Argentina) Ceibos	Estadio Héroes de Curupayty
TBA				Referee: Man of the Match:

18 Apr	Selknam (Chile)	v	(Uruguay) Peñarol	TBA
TBA				Referee: Man of the Match:

Bye/s: Corinthians

==== Week 7 ====
24 Apr	Corinthians (Brazil)	v	(Paraguay) Olimpia Lions	Estádio Parque São Jorge
TBA				Referee: Man of the Match:

24 Apr	Ceibos (Argentina)	v	(Chile) Selknam	Tala Rugby Club
TBA				Referee: Man of the Match:

Bye/s: Peñarol

==== Week 8 ====
29 Apr	Peñarol (Uruguay)	v	(Brazil) Corinthians	Estadio Charrúa
TBA				Referee: Man of the Match:

29 Apr	Olimpia Lions	v	Selknam	Estadio Héroes de Curupayty
TBA				Referee: Man of the Match:

Bye/s: Ceibos

==== Week 9 ====
8 May	Peñarol (Uruguay)	v	(Paraguay) Olimpia Lions	Estadio Charrúa
TBA				Referee: Man of the Match:

8 May	Corinthians (Brazil)	v	(Argentina) Ceibos	Estádio Parque São Jorge
TBA				Referee: Man of the Match:

Bye/s: Selknam

==== Week 10 ====
15 May	Ceibos (Argentina)	v	(Uruguay) Peñarol	Tala Rugby Club
TBA				Referee: Man of the Match:

16 May	Selknam (Chile)	v	(Brazil) Corinthians	TBA
TBA				Referee: Man of the Match:

Bye/s: Olimpia Lions

== Playoffs ==
=== Challenge Trophy ===
The fifth-place regular season club would have contested the challenge trophy against Cafeteros Pro over two matches.

23 May	TBD	v	TBD	TBA
TBA				Referee: Man of the Match:

27 May	TBD	v	TBD	TBA
TBA				Referee: Man of the Match:

=== Championship playoffs ===
Semi-finals
22 May -
22 May -

Final
29 May -
Third place
27 May -

==== Semifinals ====
22 May	–
		Referee: Man of the Match:

22 May	–
		Referee: Man of the Match:

==== Third-place match ====
27 May	v
		Referee: Man of the Match:

==== Final ====
29 May	v
		Referee: Man of the Match:

== Player statistics ==
=== Top scorers ===
The top try and point scorers during the 2020 Súper Liga Americana de Rugby season until the season was cancelled were:

Most points
No	Player	Team	Pts
1	(Argentina) Martín Elías	(Argentina) Ceibos	22
2	(Chile) Santiago Videla	(Chile) Selknam	15
3	(Argentina) Tomás Albornoz	(Argentina) Ceibos	11
4	(Argentina) Juan Daireaux	(Argentina) Ceibos	10
	(Argentina) Tomás Cubilla	(Argentina) Ceibos	10
	(Argentina) Facundo Cordero	(Argentina) Ceibos	10
7	(Argentina) Patricio Baronio	(Chile) Selknam	9
8	(Uruguay) Federico Favaro	(Uruguay) Peñarol	8
9	(Uruguay) Santiago Arata	(Uruguay) Peñarol	5
	(Argentina) Manuel Montero	(Paraguay) Olimpia	5
	(Argentina) Leonel Oviedo	(Argentina) Ceibos	5
	(Argentina) Ignacio Inchauspe	(Argentina) Ceibos	5
13	(Argentina) Máximo Ledesma	(Paraguay) Olimpia	3
