= Matías Orlando =

Argentine rugby union player

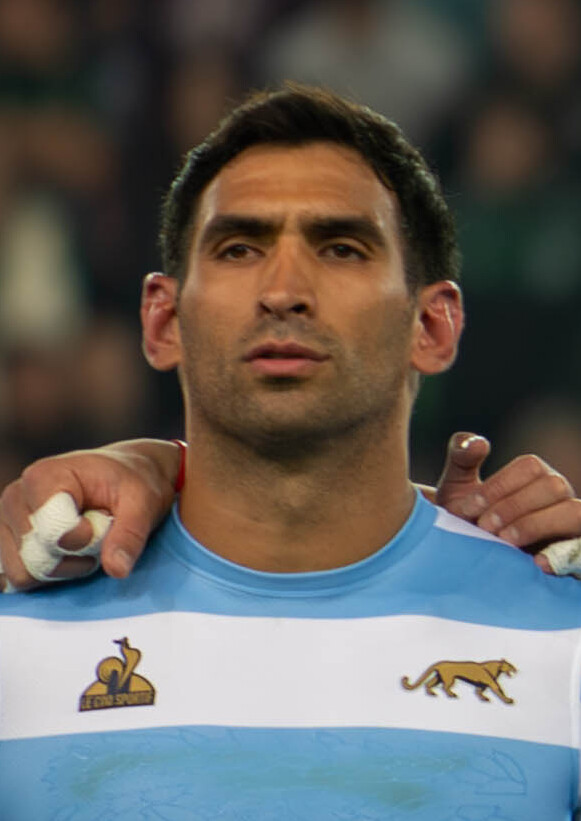
- Born: 14 November 1991 (age 34) Concepción,Tucumán, Argentina
- Height: 6 ft 0 in (1.83 m)
- Weight: 207 lb (14 st 11 lb; 94 kg)

Rugby union career
- Position: Centre
Amateur team(s)
Years	Team	Apps	(Points)
2012-	Huirapuca Social Club		
Senior career
Years	Team	Apps	(Points)
2012-2014	Pampas XV		
2020–2024	Newcastle Falcons		
2024–2025	Miami Sharks		
2026-	Tarucas		
Provincial / State sides
Years	Team	Apps	(Points)
- Tucumán
Super Rugby
Years	Team	Apps	(Points)
2016−2020	Jaguares	12	(0)
- Correct as of 16 July 2020
International career
Years	Team	Apps	(Points)
2012-2013	Jaguars		
2012-	Argentina	58	(25)
- Correct as of 27 December 2025

Matías Orlando (born 14 November 1991 in Tucumán) is an Argentine professional rugby union player who played for the Tarucas in the Super Rugby Americas. He plays as a wing and centre.

Orlando plays for Miami Sharks in Major League Rugby since 2024. He previously played for Pampas XV, from 2012 to 2014, in the Vodacom Cup, and for the Jaguares in the Super Rugby from 2016 to 2020.

He has 41 caps for Argentina, since his first game at 40–5 win over Uruguay at 20 May 2012, for the South American Rugby Championship, in Santiago, Chile. He was called for the 2014 Rugby Championship but he never played. He has currently 2 tries scored, 10 points on aggregate.

Orlando was a starter for the Argentina national team on 14 November 2020 in their first ever win against the All Blacks.
