= Franco Molina =

English rugby union player

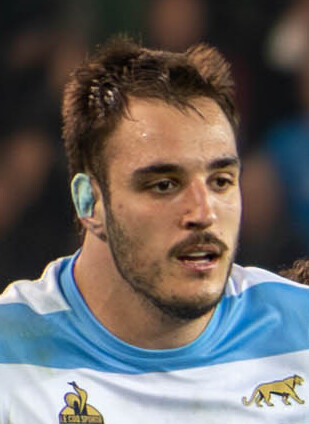
- Molina in 2024
- Born: Franco Molina; 28 August 1997 (age 29) Cordoba, Córdoba Province, Argentina
- Height: 1.98 m (6 ft 6 in)
- Weight: 120 kg (260 lb; 18 st 13 lb)

Rugby union career
- Position: Lock
- Current team: Force
Amateur team(s)
Years	Team	Apps	(Points)
- Jockey Club Córdoba
Senior career
Years	Team	Apps	(Points)
2019–2021	Jaguares XV	15	(10)
2020	Ceibos	2	(0)
2022	Selknam	9	(15)
2023–2024	Dogos XV	23	(0)
2024–2025	Exeter Chiefs	17	(0)
2026–	Force	13	(20)
- Correct as of 30 May 2026
International career
Years	Team	Apps	(Points)
2016–2017	Argentina U20	8	(0)
2018–2021	Argentina XV	19	(10)
2024–	Argentina	19	(5)
- Correct as of 27 November 2024

Franco Molina (born 28 August 1997) is an Argentinian rugby union player who plays for the Western Force in the Super Rugby and the Argentina national team.

== Career ==
Molina made his mark on the Argentina U20 side during the 2016 & 2017 U20 World Rugby Championship.

His performances with the side led to a call-up to the Argentina XV side that competed in the Americas Rugby Championship between 2016 and 2018. In 2018, he was named in the Argentina senior squad for the 2018 Rugby Championship but never made his test debut.

Molina played for his hometown club Ceibos and Jaguares XV before moving to Chile to play for Selknam in the Super Rugby Americas. He played for another Argentina side, Dogos XV, in the same competition, where he made 23 appearances for as captain of the side.

Molina manage to make his test debut for Argentina in a 28–13 loss against France in Mendoza during the 2024 Summer Test series. Since then, he has featured for the Pumas in the 2024 Rugby Championship, including in the historic victory over New Zealand in August.

On 3 October 2024, Molinas moved to England to join Exeter Chiefs in the Gallagher Premiership from the 2024–25 season.

In July 2025, the Perth-based Western Force team of the Super Rugby announced they had signed Molina ahead of the 2026 season on a two-year deal. In his first appearance for the team, Molina scored a try, which came in the first round against one of the teams rivals, the ACT Brumbies. The Force lost 24–56 at Perth Rectangular Stadium.

== Honours ==
=== Club ===
- (Argentina) Jaguares XV
  - Winners of the Currie Cup in 2019
  - Winners of the Super Rugby Americas in 2021
- (Chile) Selknam
  - Finalists of the Super Rugby Americas in 2022
- (Argentina) Dogos XV
  - Finalists of the Super Rugby Americas in 2023
  - Winners of the Super Rugby Americas in 2024

=== International ===
- Argentina XV
  - Winners of the World Rugby Americas Pacific Challenge in 2017
  - Winners of the Americas Rugby Championship in 2019
