= Gabriel Ascárate =

Argentine rugby union player (born 1987)

- Full name: Gabriel Ascárate
- Born: 20 October 1987 (age 39) San Miguel de Tucumán, Argentina
- Height: 1.83 m (6 ft 0 in)
- Weight: 94 kg (14 st 11 lb; 207 lb)

Rugby union career
- Position: Centre / Wing
- Current team: Retired
Amateur team(s)
Years	Team	Apps	(Points)
2014	Club Natación y Gimnasia		
- Buenos Aires Cricket & Rugby Club
2018−2019	Club Natación y Gimnasia	6	(5)
2021−2024	Cascais Rugby Linha		
Senior career
Years	Team	Apps	(Points)
2010–2012	Pampas XV	16	(15)
2012–2013	US Carcassonne	18	(7)
2013–2014	Glasgow Warriors	6	(5)
2015	Pampas XV		
2016	Jaguares	0	(0)
2020	Olimpia Lions	1	(0)
- Correct as of 8 August 2024
International career
Years	Team	Apps	(Points)
2006	Argentina U19	7	(49)
2007	Argentina U21	2	(5)
2007–08	Argentina A	3	(10)
2008–11	Pumas Sevens	5	
2009–10	Argentina Jaguars	7	(5)
2007–2017	Argentina	19	(20)
- Correct as of 8 August 2024

Gabriel Ascárate (born 20 October 1987) is a former Argentine player and coach who coaches Cascais Rugby Linha. He played as a centre.

== Career ==
Ascárate started his career in his homeland playing for both Club Natación y Gimnasia in his hometown of San Miguel de Tucumán and later the Buenos Aires Cricket & Rugby Club. He also represented the Pampas XV in the South African Vodacom Cup between 2010 and 2012 before moving abroad to join French side US Carcassonne for the 2012–13 season. He made 18 appearances in France before moving north in July 2013 to join Glasgow Warriors. He was released by Glasgow Warriors in February 2014 after being ruled out from 'contact rugby' for 6 months.

== International career ==
He made his senior debut for Los Pumas against Chile in May 2007 and to date he has amassed 8 caps and scored 2 tries. He is also a former Pumas Sevens player, making 5 appearances in the IRB Sevens World Series between 2008 and 2011.
