= 2026 Super Rugby Americas season =

7th edition of rugby union competition

2026 Súper Rugby Américas season
- Countries: Argentina; Brazil; Chile; Paraguay; Uruguay
- Number of teams: 8
- Date: 20 February – 19 June 2026
- Champions: Pampas XV (1st title)
- Runners-up: Dogos XV
- Matches played: 59

Official website
- superrugbyamericas.com

The 2026 Súper Rugby Américas season is the seventh edition of the Súper Rugby Américas (SRA), the premier men's rugby union competition in South America, established in 2019. The season fixtures were released on 1 December 2025. The 2026 season features an eighth team (fourth from Argentina), a new addition from the previous season: the Capibaras from Rosario.

== Teams and personnel ==
=== Overview ===
| Union | Team | Stadia information | | Coach | Captain |
| Union | Team | Stadia | Capacity | Coach | Captain |
|---|---|---|---|---|---|
| Argentina | Capibaras | Jockey Club de Rosario, Rosario | —N/a | Nicolás Galatro | TBD |
| Argentina | Capibaras | Estadio Parque Artigas, Paysandú | 25,000 | Nicolás Galatro | TBD |
| Argentina | Dogos | Tala Rugby Club, Córdoba | 3,000 | Diego Ghiglione | TBD |
| Argentina | Pampas | Club Atlético San Isidro, Buenos Aires | 3,000 | Juan Manuel Leguizamón | TBD |
| Argentina | Tarucas | La Caldera del Parque, San Miguel de Tucumán | 8,000 | Álvaro Galindo | TBD |
| Brazil | Cobras | Estádio Du Cambusano, Jacareí | 10,723 | Josh Reeves | TBD |
| Chile | Selknam | Estadio Municipal de La Pintana, Santiago | 5,000 | Jake Mangin | TBD |
| Paraguay | Yacare | Estadio Héroes de Curupayty, Luque | 3,000 | Ramiro Pemán | TBD |
| Uruguay | Peñarol | Estadio Charrúa, Montevideo | 14,000 | Ivo Dugonjic | TBD |

=== Locations ===
2026 Super Rugby Americas season (South America)
Home locations of all the Súper Rugby Américas teams (inside South America)

== Regular season ==
2026 Súper Rugby Américas table
| Pos | Team | Pld | W | D | L | PF | PA | PD | TF | TA | TB | LB | Pts | Qualification |
|---|---|---|---|---|---|---|---|---|---|---|---|---|---|---|
| 1 | z- Dogos | 14 | 12 | 0 | 2 | 483 | 333 | +150 | 73 | 41 | 12 | 1 | 61 | Knockout stage |
| 2 | c- Pampas | 14 | 10 | 0 | 4 | 503 | 314 | +189 | 71 | 40 | 11 | 3 | 54 | Knockout stage |
| 3 | x- Capibaras | 14 | 9 | 0 | 5 | 434 | 318 | +116 | 57 | 46 | 8 | 3 | 47 | Knockout stage |
| 4 | x- Tarucas | 14 | 9 | 0 | 5 | 459 | 365 | +94 | 58 | 51 | 7 | 1 | 44 | Knockout stage |
| 5 | e- Selknam | 14 | 7 | 0 | 7 | 389 | 423 | −34 | 54 | 56 | 10 | 3 | 41 | |
| 6 | e- Peñarol | 14 | 6 | 0 | 8 | 361 | 412 | −51 | 53 | 53 | 8 | 2 | 34 | |
| 7 | e- Yacare | 14 | 1 | 1 | 12 | 296 | 441 | −145 | 36 | 66 | 3 | 4 | 13 | |
| 8 | e- Cobras | 14 | 1 | 1 | 12 | 254 | 573 | −319 | 35 | 84 | 3 | 2 | 11 | |

Updated to match(es) played on 30/05/2026. Source: https://www.superrugbyamericas.com/torneo-11

Notes

- z – Clinched home field advantage for the entire playoffs
- c – Clinched home field advantage for the conference semi-finals
- x – Clinched playoff spot
- e – Eliminated from playoff contention

=== Round-by-round ===
The table below shows each team's progression throughout the season. For each round, their cumulative points total is shown with the overall log position in brackets:

Team progression
| Team | R1 | R2 | R3 | R4 | R5 | R6 | R7 | R8 | R9 | R10 | R11 | R12 | R13 | R14 | SF | Final |
|---|---|---|---|---|---|---|---|---|---|---|---|---|---|---|---|---|
| Capibaras | 5 (1st) | 10 (1st) | 11 (4th) | 15 (3rd) | 15 (4th) | 16 (4th) | 21 (4th) | 26 (3rd) | 31 (3rd) | 35 (3rd) | 40 (2nd) | 45 (3rd) | 47 (3rd) | 47 (3rd) | | |
| Cobras | 1 (5th) | 1 (7th) | 5 (7th) | 5 (7th) | 5 (7th) | 5 (8th) | 7 (8th) | 7 (8th) | 7 (8th) | 10 (8th) | 10 (8th) | 10 (8th) | 11 (8th) | 11 (8th) | | |
| Dogos | 4 (4th) | 9 (3rd) | 11 (2nd) | 15 (1st) | 21 (1st) | 26 (1st) | 27 (2nd) | 32 (2nd) | 37 (1st) | 41 (1st) | 46 (1st) | 51 (1st) | 56 (1st) | 61 (1st) | | |
| Pampas | 5 (2nd) | 7 (4th) | 11 (3rd) | 16 (2nd) | 21 (2nd) | 26 (2nd) | 31 (1st) | 36 (1st) | 37 (2nd) | 38 (2nd) | 40 (3rd) | 45 (2nd) | 49 (2nd) | 54 (2nd) | | |
| Peñarol | 0 (7th) | 0 (8th) | 5 (6th) | 10 (5th) | 10 (6th) | 14 (5th) | 14 (6th) | 16 (6th) | 21 (6th) | 22 (6th) | 27 (6th) | 29 (6th) | 34 (6th) | 34 (6th) | | |
| Selknam | 0 (6th) | 5 (5th) | 6 (5th) | 6 (6th) | 11 (5th) | 13 (6th) | 17 (5th) | 22 (5th) | 27 (4th) | 32 (4th) | 34 (4th) | 34 (5th) | 36 (5th) | 41 (5th) | | |
| Tarucas | 5 (3rd) | 9 (2nd) | 13 (1st) | 13 (4th) | 18 (3rd) | 23 (3rd) | 23 (3rd) | 23 (4th) | 23 (5th) | 24 (5th) | 29 (5th) | 34 (4th) | 39 (4th) | 44 (4th) | | |
| Yacare | 0 (8th) | 2 (6th) | 3 (8th) | 4 (8th) | 5 (8th) | 6 (7th) | 11 (7th) | 11 (7th) | 11 (7th) | 13 (7th) | 13 (7th) | 13 (7th) | 13 (7th) | 13 (7th) | | |
| Key: | Win | Draw | Loss | Bye | DNQ = Did not qualify | | | | | | | | | | | |

=== Matches ===
| Home \ Away | CAP | COB | DOG | PAM | PEÑ | SEL | TAR | YAC |
|---|---|---|---|---|---|---|---|---|
| Capibaras | — | 54–12 | 25–26 | 28–21 | 34–7 | 34–17 | 39–28 | 53–21 |
| Cobras | 19–40 | — | 19–48 | 19–49 | 12–35 | 26–27 | 26–61 | 21–19 |
| Dogos | 29–24 | 21–19 | — | 43–28 | 32–22 | 68–0 | 18–13 | 44–20 |
| Pampas | 25–20 | 59–0 | 34–36 | — | 34–3 | 30–28 | 38–39 | 31–14 |
| Peñarol | 32–38 | 38–20 | 31–33 | 14–47 | — | 40–27 | 18–28 | 25–24 |
| Selknam | 27–17 | 45–14 | 28–35 | 31–34 | 41–26 | — | 37–13 | 34–32 |
| Tarucas | 42–15 | 52–22 | 29–26 | 22–43 | 20–34 | 41–13 | — | 43–14 |
| Yacare | 12–13 | 25–25 | 41–20 | 17–30 | 22–36 | 13–34 | 22–28 | — |

Legend: Blue = home team win; Yellow = draw; Red = away team win.

== Knockout stage ==
=== Bracket ===
Semi-finals
1 | Dogos XV | 35
4 | Tarucas | 13
2 | Pampas XV | 19
3 | Capibaras XV | 11

Final
1 | Dogos XV | 17
2 | Pampas XV | 26

=== Semi-finals ===
12 June 2026

| Dogos | 35–13 | Tarucas |
| Try: Ocampo 14'; Viola 29'; Montilla 37'; Revol 42'; Con: Roger (3/4) 15', 30', 43'; Pen: Roger (3/3) 59', 64', 68' | Report | Try: Pasquini 47'; Con: Ferro (1/1) 48'; Pen: Ferro (2/2) 38', 54' |

Córdoba Athletic Club, Córdoba
Referee: Pablo Deluca

12 June 2026

| Pampas | 19–11 | Capibaras |
| Try: Marguery 16'; Con: Renthel (1/1) 17'; Pen: Renthel (4/4) 15', 22', 27', 35' | Report | Try: Greñón 39'; Pen: Dogliani (2/2) 18', 30' |

Estadio del CASI, San Isidro
Referee: Tomás Bertazza

=== Final ===
19 June 2026

| Dogos | 17–26 | Pampas |
| Try: de Vértiz 19'; Soler 78'; Con: Roger (1/1) 20'; Rodríguez (1) 79'; Pen: Roger (1/1) 62' | Report | Try: Fraga 30'; Wade 40'; Ulloa 66'; Con: Farisé (1/1) 67'; Pen: Renthel (2/2) 4', 53'; Farisé (1/1) 74' |

Córdoba Athletic Club, Córdoba

== Player statistics ==
=== Top scorers ===
The top try and point scorers during the 2026 Super Rugby Americas season are:

Most points
| No | Player | Team | Pts |
|---|---|---|---|
| 1 | (Argentina) Bautista Farisé | (Argentina) Pampas XV | 124 |
| 2 | (Chile) Matías Garafulic | (Chile) Selknam | 110 |
| 3 | (Argentina) Ignacio Cerrutti | (Argentina) Tarucas | 100 |
| 4 | (Argentina) Joaquín Lamas | (Paraguay) Yacare XV | 96 |
| 5 | (Argentina) Ignacio Dogliani | (Argentina) Capibaras XV | 94 |
| 6 | (Uruguay) Justo Ferrario | (Uruguay) Peñarol | 90 |
| 7 | (Argentina) Julián Hernández | (Argentina) Dogos XV | 75 |
| 8 | (Argentina) Estanislao Renthel | (Argentina) Pampas XV | 69 |
| 9 | (Argentina) Juan Baronio | (Argentina) Capibaras XV | 66 |
| 10 | (Argentina) Juan Greising Revol | (Argentina) Dogos XV | 55 |

Most Tries
| No | Player | Team | Tries |
|---|---|---|---|
| 1 | (Argentina) Juan Greising Revol | (Argentina) Dogos | 11 |
| 2 | (Chile) Augusto Böhme | (Chile) Selknam | 10 |
| 3 | (Uruguay) Joaquín Myzska | (Uruguay) Peñarol | 9 |
| 3 | (Argentina) Santiago Pernas | (Argentina) Pampas | 9 |
| 3 | (Argentina) Franco Rosetto | (Argentina) Capibaras | 9 |
| 6 | (Argentina) Mateo Pasquini | (Argentina) Tarucas | 8 |
| 6 | (Argentina) Mateo Soler | (Argentina) Dogos | 8 |
| 6 | (Argentina) Nicolás Viola | (Argentina) Dogos | 8 |
| 9 | (Argentina) Lautaro Cipriani | (Argentina) Capibaras | 7 |
| 9 | (Argentina) Facundo Pueyrredón | (Argentina) Dogos | 7 |
