= Joaquín Moro =

Argentine rugby player (born 2001)

- Born: 24 January 2001 (age 25)
- Height: 189 cm (6 ft 2 in)
- Weight: 99 kg (218 lb)

Rugby union career
- Position: Flanker
- Current team: Leicester Tigers
Senior career
Years	Team	Apps	(Points)
2024-2025	Pampas		
2025–	Leicester Tigers	35	(40)
- Correct as of 1 November 2026
International career
Years	Team	Apps	(Points)
2024–	Argentina	4	(0)

Joaquín Moro (born 24 January 2001) is an Argentine rugby union player. He plays as a flanker for Leicester Tigers and the Argentina national rugby union team.

== Club career ==
He played for Argentine club Argentino de Bahía Blanca prior to playing for Pampas in Super Rugby Americas in 2024 and 2025. He was named in the Super Rugby Americas 2024 All-Star squad of most effective players in May 2024.

In May 2025, he was announced as signing a two-year contract with English Premiership Rugby club Leicester Tigers ahead of the 2025–26 season.

== International career ==
He made his debut for the Argentina national rugby union team in June 2024, playing at flanker. He scored two tries on debut against Uruguay in a 79–5 win. He was named in the Argentina squad ahead of their fixture against the British and Irish Lions in June 2025.
