= Puma Trophy =

International rugby union competition

- The Puma Trophy
- Sport: Rugby union
- Instituted: 2000; 26 years ago
- Number of teams: 2
- Country: Argentina; Australia
- Holders: Australia (2026)
- Most titles: Australia (14 titles)

The Puma Trophy (Spanish: Trofeo Puma) is an international rugby union trophy between Argentina and Australia. The trophy is a bronzed statue of a puma, the nickname of the Argentina national team.

== History ==
Although Argentina and Australia's first Test match against one another was in 1979, the Puma Trophy was first introduced in 2000. In the inaugural contest the trophy was played over two Tests, with Australia winning 53–6 and 32–25 in Argentina. It was later contested again in Buenos Aires during Australia's 2002 tour of Argentina and Europe, which Australia won 17–6.

In 2012, following Argentina's inclusion into the The Rugby Championship, the Puma Trophy became contested annually over two Tests, although was played in one-off Tests during Rugby World Cup (RWC) years due to the shortening of the tournament. The first draw between the two sides since the creation of the Puma Trophy happened in the 2020 Tri Nations Series (15–15). The next meeting, two weeks later, was also a draw. As a result, Australia retained the trophy for another year.

In round two of the 2023 Rugby Championship, which was shortened to one-off matches per team due to the 2023 Rugby World Cup, Argentina defeated Australia on Australian soil for the first time since 2018 to seal the Puma Trophy for the first time in its history. Argentina, whom were behind by four points with four minutes of the match remaining, scored in the 78th minute to win the game. It was also their first win in Sydney from six matches.

The following year, Argentina successfully retained the trophy for the first time. After initially losing their first Test in La Plata in the 80th minute by one point, they achieved their biggest win against Australia in the second Test, winning 67–27 in Santa Fe. The 40-point win was also Australia's second-largest defeat ever, behind their 53–8 loss to South Africa in 2008. In 2025, they successfully retained the trophy again after defeating Australia by two-points in their second Test in Sydney.

In late 2025, the South African Rugby Union (SARU) and New Zealand Rugby (NZR) confirmed they were undertaking traditional reciprocal tours of each other in 2026 and 2030. This change scrapped the annual Rugby Championship for those years, which meant any matches between Argentina and Australia during 2026 would take place outside of the usual Rugby Championship tournament. Rugby Australia (RA) later revealed that they would be undertaking a two-Test tour of Argentina during which the Puma Trophy would be contested.

In 2026, Australia, whom recorded one Test win and one draw in Argentina, reclaimed the Puma Trophy on their first tour of the country since 2000.

== Statistics and results ==
As of 6 September 2026.

Host	Matches	Won by Argentina	Won by Australia	Draws	Argentina points	Australia points
Argentina	13	3	9	1	335	389
Australia	16	3	11	2	303	445
Neutral	1	0	1	0	21	33
Overall	30	6	21	3	659	867

=== Results ===
Year	Date	Venue	Home	Score	Away	Winner
2000	17 June	Ballymore Stadium, Brisbane	Australia	53–6	Argentina	
2000	24 June	Canberra Stadium, Canberra	Australia	32–25	Argentina	
2002	2 November	Estadio Monumental Antonio Vespucio Liberti, Buenos Aires	Argentina	6–17	Australia	
2012	15 September	Robina Stadium, Gold Coast	Australia	23–19	Argentina	
2012	6 October	Estadio Gigante de Arroyito, Rosario	Argentina	19–25	Australia	
2013	15 September	Subiaco Oval, Perth	Australia	14–13	Argentina	
2013	5 October	Estadio Gigante de Arroyito, Rosario	Argentina	17–54	Australia	
2014	13 September	Robina Stadium, Gold Coast	Australia	32–25	Argentina	
2014	4 October	Estadio Malvinas Argentinas, Mendoza	Argentina	21–17	Australia	
2015	25 July	Estadio Malvinas Argentinas, Mendoza	Argentina	9–34	Australia	
2016	17 September	Perth Rectangular Stadium, Perth	Australia	36–20	Argentina	
2016	8 October	Twickenham Stadium, London	Argentina	21–33	Australia	
2017	16 September	Canberra Stadium, Canberra	Australia	45–20	Argentina	
2017	7 October	Estadio Malvinas Argentinas, Mendoza	Argentina	20–37	Australia	
2018	15 September	Robina Stadium, Gold Coast	Australia	19–23	Argentina	
2018	6 October	Estadio Padre Ernesto Martearena, Salta	Argentina	34–45	Australia	
2019	27 July	Lang Park, Brisbane	Australia	16–10	Argentina	
2020	21 November	Newcastle International Sports Centre, Newcastle	Australia	15–15	Argentina	
2020	5 December	Western Sydney Stadium, Parramatta	Australia	16–16	Argentina	
2021	25 September	North Queensland Stadium, Townsville	Australia	27–8	Argentina	
2021	2 October	Robina Stadium, Gold Coast	Australia	32–17	Argentina	
2022	6 August	Estadio Malvinas Argentinas, Mendoza	Argentina	26–41	Australia	
2022	13 August	Estadio San Juan del Bicentenario, San Juan	Argentina	48–17	Australia	
2023	15 July	Western Sydney Stadium, Parramatta	Australia	31–34	Argentina	
2024	31 August	Estadio Jorge Luis Hirschi, La Plata	Argentina	19–20	Australia	
2024	7 September	Estadio Brigadier General Estanislao López, Santa Fe	Argentina	67–27	Australia	
2025	6 September	North Queensland Stadium, Townsville	Australia	28–24	Argentina	
2025	13 September	Sydney Football Stadium, Moore Park	Australia	26–28	Argentina	
2026	29 August	Estadio 23 de Agosto, San Salvador de Jujuy	Argentina	21–27	Australia	
2026	5 September	Estadio Malvinas Argentinas, Mendoza	Argentina	28–28	Australia	

== See also ==
- History of rugby union matches between Argentina and Australia
