= Mateo Soler =

Argentine rugby union player (born 2003)

- Born: 20 May 2003 (age 23) Córdoba, Argentina
- Height: 182 cm (6 ft 0 in)
- Weight: 88 kg (194 lb; 13 st 12 lb)

Rugby union career
- Position: Wing / Fullback
- Current team: Dogos XV
Senior career
| Years | Team | Apps | (Points) |
| 2023– | Dogos XV | | |
- Correct as of 27 September 2026
International career
| Years | Team | Apps | (Points) |
| 2022–2023 | Argentina U20 | 8 | (15) |
| 2023 | Argentina XV | 2 | (0) |
| 2026– | Argentina | 1 | (0) |
- Correct as of 27 September 2026

Mateo Soler (born 20 May 2003) is an Argentine rugby union player, who plays for Dogos XV. His preferred position is wing or fullback.

== Early career ==
Soler is from Cordoba in Argentina, and played his club rugby for Tala Rugby Club. He is the son of former Argentina national player Facundo Soler.

== Professional career ==
Soler signed professionally with Dogos XV ahead of the 2023 Super Rugby Americas season, and the following season helped the side win the title. He remained with the team in 2025 as they were losing finalists, and was again named in the side for the 2026 season.

Soler was named in the Argentina XV squad for their fixtures against Uruguay and Chile in 2023. In July 2026, Soler was named in the Argentina squad for their upcoming tests as a training player. He made his debut on 5 September against Australia, coming on as a replacement.
