= Juan López =

Juan López may refer to:

== Arts and entertainment ==
- Juan López Moctezuma (1932–1995), Mexican film director
- Juan López Fernández (born 1939), Spanish comic book artist, better known by his pseudonym Jan
- Juan López, secret identity of the fictional comic book character Superlópez

== Politics and law ==
- Juan López de Palacios Rubios (1450–1524), Spanish jurist
- Juan Hernández López (1859 – after 1933), Puerto Rican politician and attorney
- Juan López Sánchez (1900–72), member of Republican government during the Spanish civil war
- Juan Fernando López Aguilar (born 1961), Spanish politician
- Juan López de Uralde (born 1963), Spanish politician
- Juan Carlos López Fernández (born 1965), Mexican politician
- Juan Manuel López (born 1983), Argentine politician

== Religion ==
- Juan López (bishop of Coria) (died 1501), Roman Catholic bishop
- Juan López (cardinal) (c. 1455–1501), Spanish cardinal
- Juan López de Zárate (1490–1555), Spanish Roman Catholic bishop
- Juan López (bishop of Crotone) (died 1632), Roman Catholic bishop
- Juan López de Agurto de la Mata (1572–1637), Spanish Roman Catholic bishop
- Juan Damián López de Haro (1581–1648), Spanish Roman Catholic bishop
- Juan López Galván (1613–1674), Filipino archbishop
- Juan Guillermo López Soto (1947–2021), Mexican Roman Catholic prelate

== Sports ==
=== Association football ===
- Juan López (1892-unknown), Spanish football forward
- Juan López (1908–1983), Uruguayan football manager who won the 1950 World Cup
- Juan López Hita (1944–2014), Spanish footballer
- Juan José López (born 1950), Argentine football player and manager
- Juan Ramón López Caro (born 1963), Spanish football manager
- Juan Ramón López Muñiz (born 1968), Spanish football player and manager
- Juan Manuel López (footballer) (born 1969), Spanish footballer
- Juan Carlos López (footballer) (born 1989), Mexican footballer
- Juan Carlos Pérez López (born 1990), Spanish footballer

=== Boxing ===
- Juan Antonio López (1952–2004), Mexican boxer
- Juan Pablo López, Mexican boxer
- Juan Manuel López (boxer) (born 1983), Puerto Rican boxer

=== Cycling and driving ===
- Juan López Mella (1965–1995), Spanish motorcycle racer
- Juan Manuel López (racing driver), Argentinian racing driver
- Juan Carlos López (cyclist) (born 1981), Colombian cyclist
- Juan Antonio López-Cózar (born 1994), Spanish cyclist
- Juan Pedro López (born 1997), Spanish cyclist

=== Track and field ===
- Juan López (sprinter) (born 1926), Uruguayan Olympic sprinter
- Juan Miguel López (born 1967), Cuban triple jumper
- Juan López (parathlete) (active in 2000), Spanish Paralympic athlete

=== Other sports ===
- Juan López (rowing) (born 1934), Peruvian Olympic rower
- Juan López (rower) (born 1949), Mexican Olympic rower
- Juan Lopez (baseball coach, born 1952) Puerto Rican MLB coach with the New York Mets
- Juan Manuel López Iturriaga (born 1959), known as "Juanma", Spanish basketball player
- Juan López (baseball) (born 1962), Puerto Rican MLB bullpen coach for the San Francisco Giants, Chicago Cubs, and Cincinnati Reds
- Juan Martín López (active since 2006), Argentine field hockey player
- Juan López García, Spanish marathon runner

== Others ==
- Juan López de Padilla (1490–1521), insurrectionary leader in the Castilian War of the Communities
- Juan López de Hoyos (1511–1583), Spanish schoolmaster
- Juan López Pacheco, Duke of Escalona (1716–1751), Spanish noble
- Juan José López-Ibor (1906–1991), Spanish psychiatrist
- Juan López (activist) (ca. 1978 – 2024), murdered Honduran environmental activist

== Others uses ==
- Estadio Juan N. López, Mexican football stadium
- Juan López (cigar), Cuban cigar brand
- Mercedes Juan López (born 1943), Mexican doctor and politician, where "Juan López" are the surnames
