= Super López =

Spanish octogenarian marathon and ultramarathon runner

Juan López García, also known as Super López, is a Spanish octogenarian marathon and ultramarathon runner. He is the current world record holder for the 80–84 50K category, and previously set a European Marathon record for his age group in 2024.

García first started running at the age of 66. His fitness, considered unusual for his age, led him to be a subject of a study published on Frontiers Media's Frontiers in Physiology, which found that his aerobic fitness at the age of 82 matched that of a man in his 20s.
