= Faustino Sánchez Valarolo =

Argentine rugby union player

- Born: 8 July 2004 (age 22) Argentina
- Height: 187 cm (6 ft 2 in)
- Weight: 94 kg (207 lb; 14 st 11 lb)

Rugby union career
- Position: Centre
Senior career
Years	Team	Apps	(Points)
2023–	Dogos XV		
- Correct as of 21 December 2025
International career
Years	Team	Apps	(Points)
2022–2024	Argentina U20	13	(10)
2025–	Argentina	1	(0)
- Correct as of 21 December 2025

Faustino Sánchez Valarolo (born 8 July 2004) is an Argentine rugby union player. His preferred position is centre.

== Early career ==
Sánchez Valarolo plays his club rugby for Club Palermo Bajo. He represented the Argentina U20 side between 2022 and 2024.

== Professional career ==
Sánchez Valarolo has represented the Dogos XV side since 2023, helping the side to the final in the 2023 Super Rugby Americas season. In 2024, he helped the side win the 2024 Super Rugby Americas season, before returning again in 2025 to be named breakthrough player of the year.

Sánchez Valarolo was first called into the Argentina squad during for the match against the British & Irish Lions in June 2025. He would make his debut for Argentina against Uruguay in July 2025.
