= Nicolás Roger =

Argentine rugby union player

- Full name: Nicolás Roger Farias
- Born: 11 January 2000 (age 26) Santiago del Estero, Argentina
- Height: 177 cm (5 ft 10 in)
- Weight: 79 kg (174 lb; 12 st 6 lb)
- Notable relative: Martin Roger Farias (brother)

Rugby union career
- Position: Fly-half
- Current team: Benetton
Senior career
Years	Team	Apps	(Points)
2021	Cafeteros Pro	7	(32)
2022	Peñarol	10	(26)
2022–2023	CUS Torino	16	(95)
2024	Selknam		
2025	Tarucas	11	(110)
2025–2026	Benetton	2	(0)
- Correct as of 30 December 2025
International career
Years	Team	Apps	(Points)
2019	Argentina U20	5	(8)
2025–	Argentina	3	(15)
- Correct as of 15 December 2025

Nicolás Roger (born 11 January 2000) is an Argentine international rugby union player. He plays for Benetton in United Rugby Championship. His preferred position is fly-half.

== Early career ==
Roger is from Santiago del Estero and began playing rugby as a junior for Santiago Lawn Tennis. In 2019 he represented the Argentina U20 side. His brother Martin is also a professional rugby player.

== Professional career ==
Roger's first professional side was the Colombian side Cafeteros Pro who he represented in the 2021 Súper Liga Americana de Rugby season. The following season he moved to Uruguay to represent Peñarol where he replaced his brother Martin and winning the title. He moved to Europe following the season, joining Italian side CUS Torino, before returning in 2024 to represent the Chilean side Selknam in the 2024 Super Rugby Americas season. Ahead of 2025, he joined the new Argentine franchise Tarucas and had a break out season.

In December 2025, he signed with Italian side Benetton in United Rugby Championship.

Roger was called into the Argentina squad for to play the British & Irish Lions in June 2025. He was then selected in the squad for the matches against England and Uruguay, making his international debut against England.
