= 2025 Super Rugby Americas season =

6th edition of rugby union competition

2025 Súper Rugby Américas season
- Countries: Argentina; Brazil; Chile; Paraguay; Uruguay
- Number of teams: 8
- Date: 14 February – 13 June 2025
- Matches played: 84

Official website
- superrugbyamericas.com

The 2025 Súper Rugby Américas season is the sixth edition of the Súper Rugby Américas (SRA), the premier men's rugby union competition in South America, established in 2019. The 2025 season features an seven team (fourth from Argentina), a new addition from the previous season: the Tarucas from Tucumán Province.

== Format ==
The eight clubs in the competition compete in the regular season and consist of a double round-robin, with each participating club playing two matches against each of the other. The top 4 clubs at the end of the regular season move on to the knockout stage, where the clubs then play in a knockout tournament, consisting of semi-finals and eventually, the final.

== Teams and personnel ==
=== Overview ===
Union	Team	Stadia information		Coach	Captain
Union	Team	Stadia	Capacity	Coach	Captain
Argentina	Capibaras	Jockey Club de Rosario, Rosario	—N/a	Nicolás Galatro	TBD
Argentina	Dogos	Tala Rugby Club, Córdoba	3,000	Diego Ghiglione	TBD
Argentina	Pampas	Club Atlético San Isidro, Buenos Aires	3,000	Juan Manuel Leguizamón	TBD
Argentina	Tarucas	La Caldera del Parque, San Miguel de Tucumán	8,000	Álvaro Galindo	TBD
Brazil	Cobras	Estádio Du Cambusano, Jacareí	10,723	Josh Reeves	TBD
Chile	Selknam	Estadio Municipal de La Pintana, Santiago	5,000	Jake Mangin	TBD
Paraguay	Yacare	Estadio Héroes de Curupayty, Luque	3,000	Ramiro Pemán	TBD
Uruguay	Peñarol	Estadio Charrúa, Montevideo	14,000	Ivo Dugonjic	TBD

=== Locations ===
2025 Super Rugby Americas season (South America)
Home locations of all the Súper Rugby Américas teams (inside South America)

== Regular season ==
2025 Súper Rugby Américas table
Pos	Team	Pld	W	D	L	PF	PA	PD	TF	TA	TB	LB	Pts	Qualification
1	Pampas	12	8	1	3	378	230	+148	52	28	5	2	41	Knockout stage
2	Selknam	12	7	0	5	340	313	+27	44	40	5	4	37	Knockout stage
3	Dogos	12	6	1	5	438	297	+141	55	38	6	5	37	Knockout stage
4	Peñarol	12	8	0	4	328	264	+64	49	32	5	2	39	Knockout stage
5	Tarucas	12	6	0	6	373	329	+44	46	41	7	3	34	
6	Yacare	12	6	0	6	309	332	−23	38	39	5	2	31	
7	Cobras	12	0	0	12	230	631	−401	29	95	3	2	5	

=== Round-by-round ===
The table below shows each team's progression throughout the season. For each round, their cumulative points total is shown with the overall log position in brackets:

Team progression
Team	R1	R2	R3	R4	R5	R6	R7	R8	R9	R10	R11	R12	R13	R14	SF	Final
Capibaras																
Cobras																
Dogos																
Pampas																
Peñarol																
Selknam																
Tarucas																
Yacare																
Key:	Win	Draw	Loss	Bye	DNQ = Did not qualify											

=== Matches ===
Home \ Away	COB	DOG	PAM	PEÑ	SEL	TAR	YAC
Cobras	—	15–74	18–78	3–35	21–28	33–54	31–38
Dogos	80–29	—	20–20	17–19	31–33	20–22	39–29
Pampas	72–14	8–22	—	24–10	16–18	39–22	19–7
Peñarol	52–23	29–28	27–32	—	22–18	28–35	50–15
Selknam	39–19	45–40	26–31	17–22	—	49–24	20–17
Tarucas		29–43	14–15	16–21	41–21	—	44–24
Yacare	33–18	19–24	32–26	36–8	29–26	30–27	—

Legend: Blue = home team win; Yellow = draw; Red = away team win.

== Knockout stage ==
=== Bracket ===
Semi-finals
1	Pampas (Argentina)	21
3	Dogos (Argentina)	27
4	Peñarol (Uruguay)	34
2	Selknam (Chile)	18

Final
Peñarol (Uruguay)	35
Dogos (Argentina)	34

=== Semi-finals ===
6 June 2025	Pampas (Argentina)	21-27	Dogos (Argentina)
	Try: I Inchauspe (20'), M Albanese (40'); Con: I Inchauspe (21'); Pen: I Inchauspe (57', 60', 78')		Try: L Cipriani (5'), A Moyano (14'), L Gea Salim (72'); Con: J Baronio (6', 14', 73'); Pen: J Baronio (53', 63')

6 June 2025	Peñarol (Uruguay)	34-18	Selknam (Chile)
	Try: L Bianchi (11'), Penalty Try (34'), M Cardoso Pinto (52'), J Myszka (55'), F Arcos Perez (65'); Con: F Etcheverry (56', 66'); Pen: F Etcheverry (62')		Try: R Martinez (57'), C Game (70'); Con: T Salas (71'); Pen: T Salas (43', 49')

=== Final ===
13 June 2025	Peñarol (Uruguay)	35-34	Dogos (Argentina)
	Try: B Basso (10', 17'), S Civetta (30'), M Diana (45'), S Alvarez (51'); Con: F Etcheverry (11', 18', 31', 46', 52')		Try: L Gea Salim (39'), A Moyano (60'), I Gandini (71'), I J Revol (77'), F Griffo (83'); Con: F Rodriguez (72', 78', 83'); Pen: J Baronio (20')
