= Cobras Brasil Rugby =

(Brazil) Cobras Brasil Rugby
- Founded: 2020; 6 years ago as "Corinthians Rugby"
- Location: Jacareí
- Ground: Estádio Nicolau Alayon (Capacity: 7,000)
- Coach: Josh Reeves
- Captain: Lorenzo Massari
- League: Super Rugby Americas
- 2025: 7th Playoffs: DNQ
Team kit

Cobras Brasil Rugby is a professional rugby union team based in São Paulo, Brazil. The team was founded in 2021 to compete in Súper Liga Americana de Rugby. Cobras replaced the rugby section of Corinthians, which had been the original franchise for the SLAR. In 2024, Cobras changed its name from Cobras Brasil XV to Cobras Brasil Rugby.

== Overview ==
Cobras became the second professional Brazilian franchise after Corinthians, the only team which did not play a single match in the cancelled 2020 season. Corinthians had only played one warm-up match in Montevideo against Peñarol Rugby (a 45–14 defeat, on February 26). SLAR's season was cancelled in March, one day before Corinthians' first match against Olímpia Lions in Asunción.

When the original team ended its contract in 2020, the CBRu decided to create a new franchise.

== Stadium ==
Due to the COVID-19 pandemic, the Brazilian team hasn't played at home in the 2021 season. The team is based in São Paulo. The training center is the Núcleo de Alto Rendimento de São Paulo (NAR). In 2023, Cobras played in São Paulo at the Estádio Nicolau Alayon. The home stadium for the 2024 is Estadio Du Cambusano, in Jacareí. In 2025, they split the matches between both stadiums, Nicolau Alayon and Du Cambusano.

In 2026, the main venue is Nicolau Alayon.

== Year-by-Year ==
Season	Pld	W	D	L	PF	PA	PD	TF	TA	TB	LB	PTS	Finish
2021	10	3	0	7	154	332	-178	20	43	1	1	14	5th
2022	10	1	0	9	145	380	-235	19	53	1	1	6	6th
2023	12	2	0	10	268	429	-161	35	63	3	2	13	7th
2024	12	2	0	10	226	425	-100	30	60	3	0	11	7th
2025	12	0	0	12	230	631	-401	29	95	3	2	5	7th
Total	56	8	0	48	1023	2197	-1174	133	314	11	6	49	

== Current squad ==
The Cobras Brasil Rugby squad for the 2026 Super Rugby Americas season is:

2026 Cobras Brasil squad
**Props**: (Brazil) Nicolas Alkmin; (Brazil) **Brendon Alves**; (Argentina) Santiago Bonavento; (Argentina) Lautaro Fanlo; (Brazil) **Henrique Ferreira**; (Brazil) **João Marino**; (Brazil) Davi Montejano; (Argentina) Facundo Moreno; **Hookers**: (Brazil) João Arraez; (Canada) **Austin Creighton**; (Brazil) Túlio Oliveira; (United States) Nick Sydorowitz; (Brazil) **Endy Willian**; **Locks**: (South Africa) Vincent Brits; (Brazil) **Cléber Dias**; (Brazil) **Helder Lúcio**; (South Africa) Motomotsi Mokunyane; (Brazil) **Gabriel Oliveira**	**Back row**: (Brazil) **Pedro Aparecido**; (Brazil) **André Arruda**; (Brazil) **Matheus Claudio**; (Brazil) **Adrio de Melo**; (Brazil) **Maiki Lemes**; (Brazil) **Rodolfo Martins**; (Brazil) **Renato Santos**; **Scrum-halves**: (South Africa) Zinedine Booysen; (South Africa) Ashwin Cox; (Brazil) **Gustavo Gobeti**; (Canada) Ethan Turner; **Fly-halves**: (Brazil) **João Amaral**; (Brazil) **Nicolas Azevedo**; (Argentina) Julián Leszczynski	**Centres**: (Zimbabwe) **Dion Khumalo**; (Brazil) **Sérgio Luna**; (Brazil) **Lorenzo Massari** **(c)**; (Brazil) **Robson Morais**; (Brazil) Aramis Padilla; (Brazil) **Robert Tenório**; **Wings**: (Brazil) **Daniel Lima**; (Brazil) Widson Menezes; (South Africa) Tasriq Mynhardt; (South Africa) **Rosko Specman**; **Fullbacks**: (Brazil) João Ribeiro; (Brazil) **Lucas Tranquez**
**(c)** denotes the team captain. **Bold** denotes internationally capped players. * denotes players qualified to play for Brazil on residency or dual nationality. Source:

== See also ==
- Brazil national rugby union team
