= Argentina XV national rugby union team =

Argentina XV
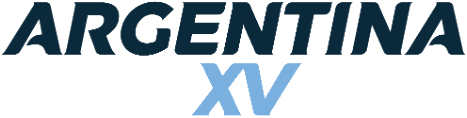
- Union: Argentine Rugby Union
- Emblem: Yaguareté
- Coach: Ignacio Fernández Lobbe
- Captain: Lautaro Bavaro
Team kit	Change kit

First international
- Argentina XV 23–11 Chile (26 September 1965)

Largest win
- Paraguay 0–152 Argentina A (1 May 2002)

Largest defeat
- Argentina A 8–30 Romania (12 June 2013)

Official website
- uar.com.ar/equipos-uar/argentina-xv/

Argentina XV, formerly known as the Jaguares, are the second national rugby union team in Argentina, after the full national side, the Pumas.

== Overview ==
They already represented Argentina at the South American Rugby Championship, in 2001, 2002, 2005, 2009 and 2011. Argentina second side won all the South American competitions they have entered and never were defeated yet by another country in these tournaments.

They competed in the Nations Cup in 2006 and 2007, winning the tournament in 2006, and in the Churchill Cup in 2008 and 2009. They've played alongside the full national teams of Namibia, Romania, Georgia, the United States, and Canada as well as other second national teams like Italy A, the Emerging Springboks, and the England Saxons. They have also competed in a number of South American tournaments and will compete against North American teams in the Americas Rugby Championship. In 2014 they participated in the IRB Tbilisi Cup.

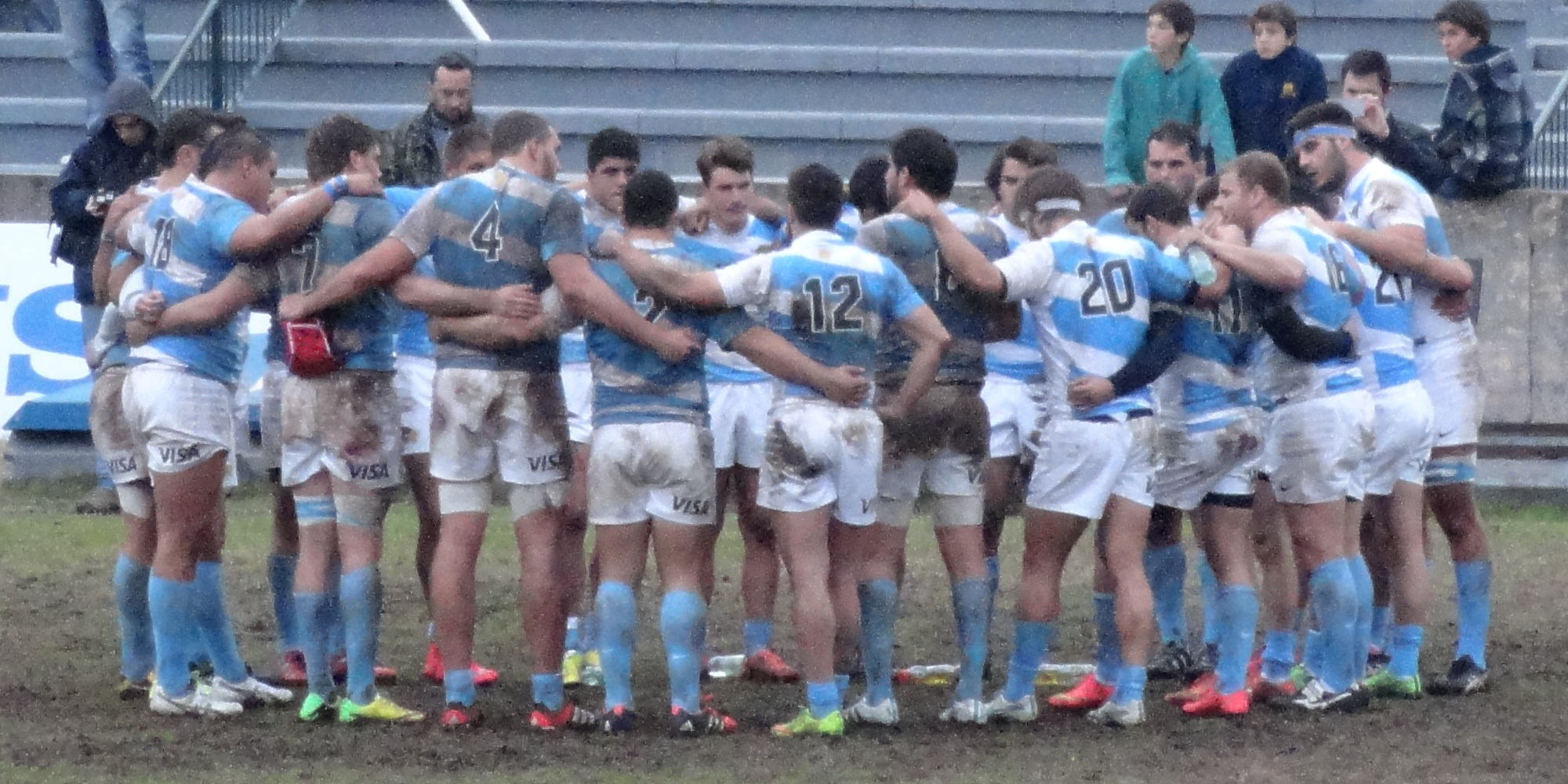
Argentina XV at a 2015 test match versus Uruguay's Teros

== Results ==
Churchill Cup

- 2005: 2nd
- 2008: 4th
- 2009: 3rd

Nations Cup / Tbilisi Cup

- 2006: 1st
- 2007: 2nd
- 2010: 4th
- 2011: 3rd
- 2012: 2nd
- 2013: 3rd
- 2014: 1st
- 2015: 2nd

Americas Rugby Championship

- 1st in 2009, 2010, 2012, 2013, 2014 and 2016.

UruCup

- 2015: 1st.

== Current squad ==
Argentina XV squad for the 2025 November European Tour (vs Munster & Bristol Bears).

Head coach: (Argentina) Álvaro Galindo

Note: Bold denotes internationally capped players

Forwards
Player	Position	Club
Juan Manuel Vivas	Hooker	(Argentina) Los Tordos
Leonel Oviedo	Hooker	(Argentina) Córdoba Athletic
Diego Correa	Prop	(Argentina) CAE
Galo Fernández	Prop	(Argentina) Universitario Córdoba
Octavio Filippa	Prop	(Argentina) Jockey Club Córdoba
Benjamín Garrido	Prop	(Argentina) Huirapuca
Matías Medrano	Prop	(Argentina) Regatas Bella Vista
Francisco Moreno	Prop	(Argentina) Universitario Tucumán
Federico Albrisi	Second row	(Argentina) Tala RC
Lorenzo Colidio	Second row	(Argentina) Duendes
Lautaro Simes	Second row	(Argentina) Tala RC
Agustín Toth	Second row	(Argentina) Lomas Athletic
Juan Pedro Bernasconi	Back row	(Argentina) La Plata
Aitor Bildosa	Back row	(Argentina) Los Tordos
Facundo Cardozo	Back row	(Argentina) Teqüe
**Nicolás D’Amorim**	Back row	(Argentina) Hindú
Juan Cruz Pérez Rachel	Back row	(Argentina) Deportiva Francesa

Backs
Player	Position	Club
Estanislao Pregot	Scrum-half	(Argentina) Jockey Club Salta
Alejo Sugasti	Scrum-half	(Argentina) Jockey Club Rosario
Bautista Farisé	Fly-half	(Argentina) Hindú
Julián Hernández	Fly-half	(Argentina) Marista
Leonardo Gea Salim	Centre	(Argentina) Jockey Club Córdoba
Tomás Medina	Centre	(Argentina) Cardenales RC
**Faustino Sánchez Valarolo**	Centre	(Argentina) Palermo Bajo
Lautaro Cipriani	Wing	(Argentina) Club Tilcara
Agustín Fraga	Wing	(Argentina) CUBA
Alfonso Latorre	Wing	(Argentina) BACRC
**Santiago Pernas**	Wing	(Argentina) Alumni
Mateo Soler	Full back	(Argentina) Tala RC
Tobías Wade	Full back	(Argentina) Alumni

== See also ==
- Pampas XV
- Jaguares (Super Rugby)
