= Tarucas (rugby union) =

Argentine rugby union team

(Argentina) Tarucas
- Full name: Los Tarucas
- Founded: 2024; 2 years ago
- Location: Tucumán Province, Argentina
- Ground(s): Estadio Héctor Cabrera, Tucumán, Argentina (Capacity: 10,000)
- Coach: Álvaro Galindo
- Captain: Matías Orlando
- League: Super Rugby Americas
- 2025: 5th Playoffs: DNQ
1st kit	2nd kit

Tarucas is a professional rugby union team based in Tucumán Province, Argentina. The team was founded in 2024 as the third Argentine team to compete in the Super Rugby Americas competition.

== Beginnings ==
The side was founded in October 2024 ahead of beginning competition in the 2025 season as the third Argentine province after Pampas XV (representing then Buenos Aires region) and Dogos XV (representing the Córdoba region). The side was created to represent the Tucumán Province in the northwest of Argentina. On 12 October 2024, it was confirmed that former Argentine international Álvaro Galindo would coach the side. Their first roster was announced in December 2024, and included Puma international Diego Fortuny. In their first season they finished in 5th place, missing out on the playoffs, beating Yacare XV in the final game to secure 5th place.

Taroucas brings the heritage of Campeonato Argentino team, which won the Championship 11 times, the last in 2014.

== Stadium ==
The Tarucas play their matches at Estadio Héctor Gallo Cabrera, home venue of Tucumán Lawn Tennis Club. It is located in Parque 9 de Julio in San Miguel de Tucumán, Argentina.

== Current squad ==
The Tarucas squad for the 2026 Super Rugby Americas season is:

2026 Tarucas squad
**Props**: (Argentina) Lorenzo Egea; (Argentina) Benjamín Farías; (Argentina) Benjamín Garrido; (Argentina) Ignacio Lazarte; (Argentina) Francisco Moreno; (Argentina) Mariano Muntaner; (Argentina) Rodrigo Navarro; (Argentina) Francisco Palazzi; **Hookers**: (Argentina) José Calderoni; (Argentina) Raúl Guraib; (Argentina) Joaquín Police; (Argentina) Juan Manuel Vivas; **Locks**: (Argentina) Luciano Asevedo; (Argentina) Franco Marini; (Argentina) Ignacio Marquieguez; (Argentina) Nicolás Parada Heit; (Argentina) Matías Salmoiraghi	**Back row**: (Argentina) Joaquín Aguilar; (Argentina) Facundo Cardozo; (Argentina) Tomás Dande; (Argentina) Facundo García Hamilton; (Argentina) Lucas Guc; (Argentina) Santiago Heredia; (Argentina) Miguel Mukdise; (Argentina) Agustín Sarelli; (Argentina) Thiago Sbrocco; **Scrum-halves**: (Argentina) Estanislao Pregot; (Argentina) Santiago Saleme; (Argentina) Matías Sauze; **Fly-halves**: (Argentina) Ignacio Cerrutti; (Argentina) Máximo Ledesma; (Argentina) Simón Pfister	**Centres**: (Argentina) Pedro Coll; (Argentina) Bautista Estofán; (Argentina) Stefano Ferro; (Argentina) Mateo Macome; (Argentina) **Matías Orlando** **(c)**; **Wings**: (Argentina) Tomás Elizalde; (Argentina) Rafael O’Gorman; (Argentina) Mateo Pasquini; (Argentina) Juan Pablo Pfister; (Argentina) Tomás Vanni; **Fullbacks**: (Argentina) **Benjamín Elizalde**; (Argentina) Mateo Estofán; (Argentina) Nicolás Macome
**(c)** denotes the team captain. **Bold** denotes internationally capped players. * denotes players qualified to play for Argentina on residency or dual nationality. Source:
