= Estádio Nicolau Alayon =

Football stadium in Brazil

Coordinates: 23°31′5.1″S 46°41′6.9″W

Nicolau Alayon Stadium
- Estádio Nicolau Alayon
- Estádio Comendador Souza

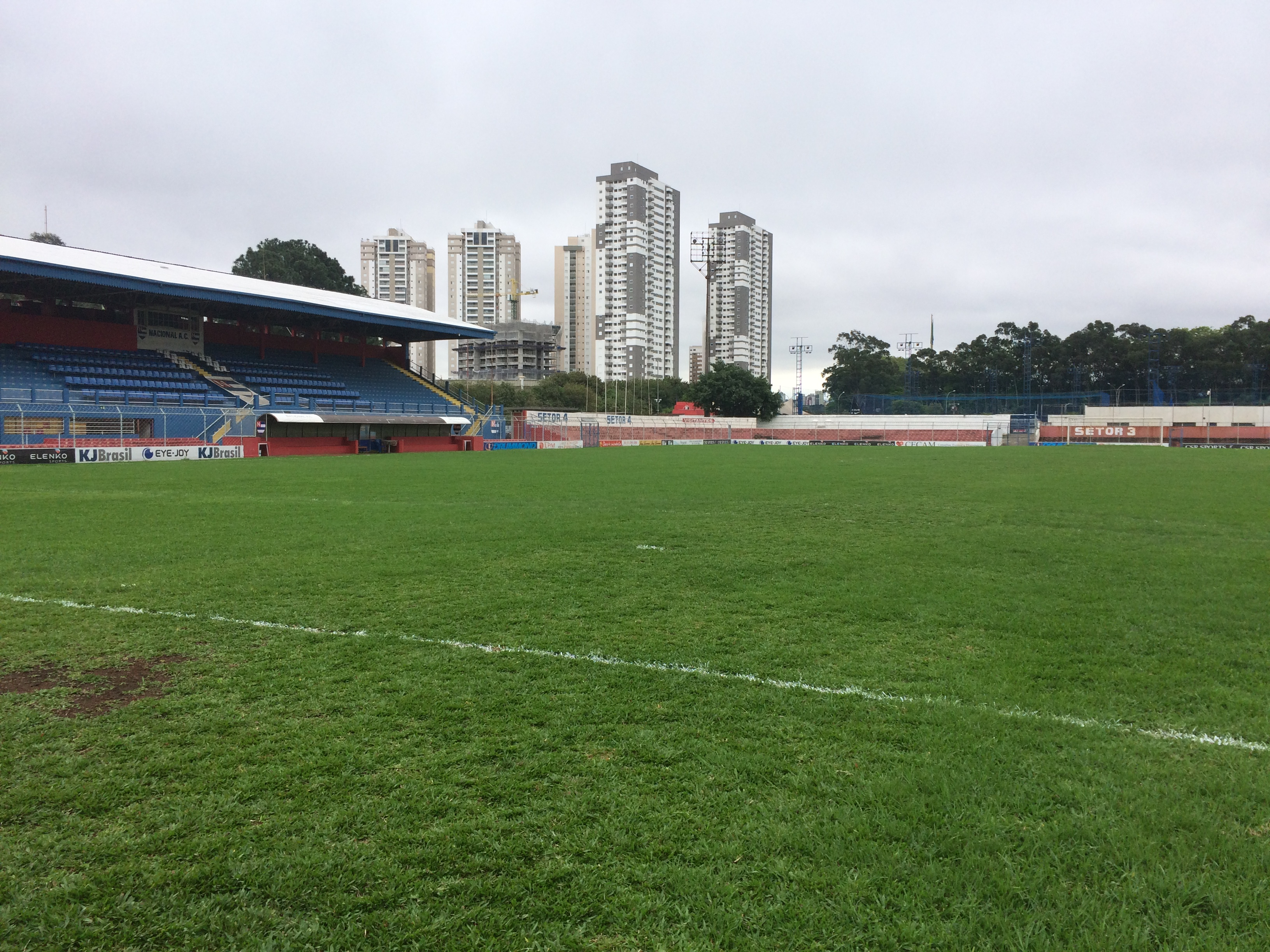
- View of the stadium in 2018
- Interactive map of Nicolau Alayon Stadium
- Address: São Paulo; Brazil
- Owner: Nacional A.C.
- Capacity: 9,660
- Surface: Natural grass
- Field size: 105 by 68 metres (114.8 yd × 74.4 yd)
- Public transit: Água Branca

Construction
- Opened: 1938; 88 years ago

Tenants
- Nacional A.C.; Cobras Brasil Rugby (rugby)

Estádio Nicolau Alayon, also known as Estádio Comendador Sousa, is a football stadium located in the Brazilian city of São Paulo, São Paulo state. It is the home stadium of Brazilian football club Nacional Atlético Clube, also known as Nacional (SP).

Audax São Paulo and rugby union team Cobras Brasil XV has also used the stadium for their home games. It has a maximum capacity of 9,660. The stadium is named after the Uruguayan Nicolau Alayon, who was Nacional's president during the stadium's construction. The stadium is nicknamed Comendador Sousa after the street where it is located in.

== History ==
The stadium was inaugurated on May 14, 1938, when Corinthians beat Nacional 2–1. The first goal of the stadium was scored by Nacional's Carlos Leite.

The stadium's attendance record currently stands at 22,000, set on February 21, 1970, when Nacional beat São Paulo 1–0.
