= Santiago Pernas =

Argentine rugby union player

- Born: 11 August 2003 (age 23) Argentina
- Height: 180 cm (5 ft 11 in)
- Weight: 91 kg (201 lb; 14 st 5 lb)

Rugby union career
- Position: Wing
Senior career
Years	Team	Apps	(Points)
2024–	Pampas XV		
- Correct as of 21 December 2025
International career
Years	Team	Apps	(Points)
2025–	Argentina	1	(0)
- Correct as of 21 December 2025

Santiago Pernas (born 11 August 2003) is an Argentine rugby union player. His preferred position is wing.

== Early career ==
Pernas is from Argentina and plays his club rugby for Asociación Alumni.

== Professional career ==
Pernas has been a member of the Pampas XV side since 2024. He represented the side in the 2024 Super Rugby Americas season as the side reached the final. He returned to the side for the 2025 season.

Pernas was first called into the Argentina squad in September 2024. He made his debut for Argentina against Uruguay in July 2025.
