= Super Rugby Americas =

Rugby union competition in South America

- Current season, competition or edition: 2026 Super Rugby Americas season
- Sport: Rugby union
- Founded: 2019; 7 years ago
- First season: 2020
- No. of teams: 8
- Countries: Argentina (4 teams); Brazil (1 team); Chile (1 team); Paraguay (1 team); Uruguay (1 team)
- Confederation: Sudamérica Rugby
- Most recent champion: Pampas (2026)
- Most titles: Peñarol (3 titles)
- Website: superrugbyamericas.com

Súper Rugby Américas (SRA), formerly known as Súper Liga Americana de Rugby (SLAR), is a franchise rugby union competition involving teams from South America. Established in 2019, the first season was begun in 2020, however was cancelled due to issues regarding the COVID-19 pandemic. After efforts by World Rugby (WR), it is organized and led by Sudamérica Rugby, the competition renamed to Súper Rugby Américas beginning in its 2023 season, in order to draw a parallel with the Super Rugby Pacific, a competition made up of franchises from Australia, Fiji, and New Zealand.

== History ==
=== Súper Liga Americana de Rugby (2020–2022) ===
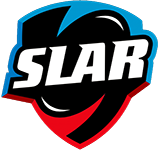
SLAR logo up to 2023

SLAR was first announced in April 2019, with plans of forming between six and eight professional franchises, two each in Uruguay and Brazil, meanwhile Argentina and Chile were to get a franchise each with plans to add two teams in 2021 with an additional team in Argentina and one from Paraguay. In November, SLAR's plans changed to a league of seven clubs, two each in Brazil and Uruguay with one team each in Argentina, Chile, and Paraguay. Officially sanctioned by Sudamérica Rugby, which is consequently part of World Rugby, the league was officially launched on November 29, 2019.

At the official announcement, SLAR confirmed the number of the teams for the 2020 season was set at five for the regular season due to the economic issues but SLAR was expected to be expanded at some point in the future, possibly in 2021. Cafeteros Pro (Colombia) joined at the end of the regular season to play a home and away series against the 5th-place finisher in the 2020 season before joining the league full-time.

The tournament could be played without problems in 2021 and 2022. During 2022, there were already ideas to carry out a joint competition between the franchises that contested the SLAR and teams from North America. During the season, the Challenge Cup of the Americas, a friendly rugby cup, was played on an experimental way.

=== Súper Rugby Américas (since 2023) ===
As it is a competition with franchises, the impact of the SLAR was in doubt. According to South American specialists, the success achieved by the tournament was relative but after various requests from institutions to join and participate in a larger tournament, World Rugby requested the expansion of the format towards a more ambitious and regional competition.

Once the news was released, Wenceslao Tejerina, High Performance Manager for Chile, announced that they were working on a new tournament. After the announcement of the new contest, the Uruguayan Sebastián Piñeyrúa, director of the South American entity, issued the following statement: "Due to the success obtained in the American Rugby Super League in the two full seasons of 2021 and 2022, from South America Rugby, SLAR organizers, we are in the middle of negotiations with national unions in North and Central America, to plan the future growth of Rugby in the continent, for this reason, we are working with all the member unions and franchises participating in SLAR 2022, to plan and develop future competitions, by franchises and international. On October 27, the format will be presented and details of the new professional competition of the Americas will be given".

In this way, after efforts by Sudamérica Rugby and World Rugby, the emergence of Super Rugby Americas was announced in October 2022, a tournament that will also be organized by USA Rugby and Rugby Canada, which will include most of the clubs that competed in SLAR 2022 with the addition of franchises from the United States and Canada.

According to the High Performance Manager of South America Rugby, Daniel Hourcade, the Unión Argentina de Rugby will also incorporate more franchises in the next editions of the new league.

=== Format history ===
Period	Name	Teams	Countries
2020	Súper Liga Americana de Rugby (SLAR)	5	Argentina, Brazil, Chile, ~~Colombia,~~ Paraguay, Uruguay
2021–2022	Súper Liga Americana de Rugby (SLAR)	6	Argentina, Brazil, Chile, Colombia, Paraguay, Uruguay
2023–2024	Súper Rugby Américas (SRA)	7	Argentina, Brazil, Chile, Paraguay, Uruguay, United States
2025	Súper Rugby Américas (SRA)	7	Argentina, Brazil, Chile, Paraguay, Uruguay
2026–	Súper Rugby Américas (SRA)	8	Argentina, Brazil, Chile, Paraguay, Uruguay

== Competition format ==
In 2020, Superliga Americana de Rugby was to span four months from February through May. For the first season, five of the six clubs Ceibos, Corinthians, Selknam, Olímpia Lions, and Peñarol planned to take part in a double round-robin regular season, playing twice against each other team, once at home and once away, for a total of eight games. The top four teams would qualify for the championship playoffs to determine a season champion. The fifth place regular season team would have played a series against Los Cafeteros Pro to determine the fifth-place team. However, on March 17, 2020, the season was postponed until 2021, as a result of the COVID-19 pandemic.

Like Super Rugby, the Major League Rugby (MLR), and the United Rugby Championship (URC), the Super Rugby Americas has no promotion and relegation.

== Teams ==
=== Current teams ===
Super Rugby Americas (South America)
Home locations of all the Súper Rugby Américas teams (inside South America)

Nat.	Team	Est.	Stadium	Location	Capacity	Ref.
Argentina	Capibaras	2025	Jockey Club de Rosario	Rosario, Santa Fe		
Brazil	Cobras	2020	Estádio Nicolau Alayon	São Paulo, São Paulo state	7,000	
Argentina	Dogos	2019	Córdoba A.C. Stadium	Córdoba, Córdoba Province	5,000	
Argentina	Pampas	2010	Estadio del CASI	San Isidro, Buenos Aires Province	4,500	
Uruguay	Peñarol	2019	Estadio Charrúa	Montevideo, Montevideo Department	14,000	
Chile	Selknam	2019	Centro de Alto Rendimiento de Rugby	La Reina, Santiago Province	2,900	
Argentina	Tarucas	2024	Tucumán Lawn Tennis Club	San Miguel de Tucumán, Tucumán	10,000	
Paraguay	Yacaré	2019	Estadio Héroes de Curupayty	Luque, Central Department	3,000	

=== Expansion teams ===
On 10 November 2020, Colombia formalized professional rugby. The South American nation's first professional rugby team was Cafeteros Pro. The team entered the Súper Liga Americana de Rugby (SLAR) in 2021.

On 6 January 2021, UAR replaced the Córdoba based team Ceibos with the Jaguares XV, following the Jaguares' departure from Super Rugby.

On 4 February 2021, the Brazilian side in the competition was renamed Cobras Brasil XV, dropping their affiliation with the Corinthians multi-sport club.

On 13 December 2022, SLAR confirmed the replacement of Cafeteros Pro, with the reintroduction of Córdoba based team Dogos XV, in the past Ceibos.

On 22 December 2022, Super Rugby Americas confirmed more news; first the return of Argentine Pampas XV in substitution of Jaguares XV, second the participation of American Raptors, third the rebranded of Paraguayan team from Olimpia Lions to Yakarés XV in order to indicate that relationship between the Paraguayan Rugby Union and the soccer team Club Olimpia is ended.

On 1 October 2024, it was confirmed that Tarucas will be joining in 2025 as the third Argentine franchise, based in Tucumán, and representing Northwest Argentina in order to replace American Raptors. On 29 September 2025, it was confiremed a new expansion to 8th team with Argentine franchise Capibaras XV from Rosario, Santa Fe and Entre Ríos provinces.

=== Expansion candidates ===
At the initial announcement, Brazil and Uruguay were originally slated to have two teams each, but instead one team each (Corinthians and Peñarol) went on to play in the 2020 season, meaning it may be possible for the two countries to expand in the future (Club Nacional de Football was hinted at as a possibility in Uruguay) besides a possible Mexican team or a second Chilean team. With the possible change of Super Rugby to a Trans-Tasman (Australasian) competition, Argentina could add a second team, the Jaguares, based in Buenos Aires, in 2021. In November 2020, another new team was proposed for 2021, with Sudamérica Rugby officially expressing interest in the inclusion of a second Argentine Buenos Aires–based team in the 2021 SLAR. However, a second Argentine team did not play in 2021 and most Argentine players would leave the team either for overseas, or to enter the draft for the 2021 Súper Liga Americana de Rugby season. In October 2022, it was confirmed that the Argentine team Tucumán would replace the Colombian team Cafeteros Pro and that two North American franchises, the Canadian Pacific Pride and U.S. American Raptors, were going to participate in this new tournament renamed Super Rugby Americas. In June 2023, after losing its bid for 2022, Tucumán, plus Salta and Santiago del Estero, renewed their request to enter the tournament in order to have 3 Argentine franchises in the future. Los Naranjas could be a new team in Super Rugby Americas 2025. A Mexican franchise could also be considered for the future. A hypothetical fourth Argentine Franchise, named Litoral, a combination of following Unions regional Entre Rios, Rosario and Santa Fe is expected to enter in the tournament for the 2026 season.

=== Former teams ===
Nat.	Team	City	Stadium	Joined	Left
(Argentina)	Ceibos	Córdoba	Tala Rugby Club Stadium	2020	2021 (Note: Pre-season.)
(Argentina)	Jaguares XV	Buenos Aires	José Amalfitani	2021	2022
(Brazil)	Corinthians	São Paulo	(none)	2020	2021
(Colombia)	Cafeteros Pro	Medellín	(none)	2020 (Note: Postseason.)	2022
(Paraguay)	Olímpia Lions	Asunción	Héroes de Curupayty	2020	2022
(United States)	American Raptors	Glendale, CO	Infinity Park	2023	2024

== Seasons ==
=== Results ===
Ed.	Year	Final			Venue	City
Ed.	Year	Winner	Score	Runner-up	Venue	City
1	2020	Cancelled due to the impacts of the COVID-19 pandemic				
2	2021	Jaguares XV (1)	36–28	Peñarol	Estadio Charrúa	Montevideo
3	2022	Peñarol (1)	24–13	Selknam	Estadio Charrúa	Montevideo
4	2023	Peñarol (2)	23–17	Dogos	Estadio Charrúa	Montevideo
5	2024	Dogos (1)	37–23	Pampas	Estadio del CASI	San Isidro
6	2025	Peñarol (3)	35–34	Dogos	Estadio Charrúa	Montevideo
7	2026	Pampas (1)	26–17	Dogos	Córdoba Athletic Club	Córdoba

=== Results summary ===
Team	Champion	Runner-up	Semi-finalist
Peñarol	3 (2022, 2023, 2025)	1 (2021)	1 (2024)
Dogos	1 (2024)	3 (2023, 2025, 2026)	—N/a
Jaguares XV	1 (2021)	—N/a	1 (2022)
Pampas	1 (2026)	1 (2024)	2 (2023, 2025)
Selknam	—N/a	1 (2022)	2 (2021, 2025)
Yacare	—N/a	—N/a	3 (2021, 2023, 2024)
Cafeteros Pro	—N/a	—N/a	1 (2022)
Capibaras XV	—N/a	—N/a	1 (2026)
Tarucas	—N/a	—N/a	1 (2026)

=== Results summary by nation ===
Region	Champion	Runner-up	Semi-finalist
Argentina	3 (2021, 2024, 2026)	3 (2023, 2024, 2025)	3 (2022, 2023, 2025)
Uruguay	3 (2022, 2023, 2025)	1 (2021)	1 (2024)
Chile	—N/a	1 (2022)	2 (2021, 2025)
Paraguay	—N/a	—N/a	3 (2021, 2023, 2024)
Colombia	—N/a	—N/a	1 (2022)

== See also ==
- South American Rugby Championship
- Americas Rugby Championship
- Major League Rugby
- Super Rugby
- United Rugby Championship
