= 2024 Super Rugby Americas season =

Fourth season of Super Rugby Americas

2024 Super Rugby Americas
- Countries: Argentina; Brazil; Chile; Paraguay; Uruguay; United States
- Date: 16 February – 15 June 2024
- Champions: (Argentina) Dogos XV (1st title)
- Runners-up: (Argentina) Pampas

Official website
- www.superrugbyamericas.com

The 2024 Super Rugby Americas season is the fifth season of the Super Rugby Americas, an annual rugby union competition mainly for South American rugby clubs. The regular season began on 16 February 2024.

== Format ==
The seven clubs in the competition compete in the regular season, which takes place over 14 rounds and consists of a double round-robin, with each participating club playing two matches against each of the other six clubs. The top 4 clubs at the end of the regular season move on to the knockout stage where the clubs then play in a knockout tournament, consisting of semi-finals and eventually, the final.

== Teams ==
Location of teams of the 2024 Super Rugby Americas.

Team	City	Stadium	Capacity	Coach	Captain
(Argentina) Dogos	Córdoba	Tala Rugby Club	6,000	(Argentina) Nicolás Galatro	(Argentina) Franco Molina
(Argentina) Pampas	Buenos Aires	CASI	5,000	(Argentina) Juan Manuel Leguizamón	(Argentina) Manuel Bernstein
(Brazil) Cobras	São Paulo	Estádio Nicolau Alayon	9,660	(Brazil) Josh Reeves	(Brazil) Cléber Dias
(Chile) Selknam	Santiago	Estadio Municipal de La Pintana	5,000	(New Zealand) Jacob Mangin	(Chile) Clemente Saavedra
(Paraguay) Yacare	Asunción	Estadio Héroes de Curupayty	3,000	(Argentina) Ricardo Le Fort	(Paraguay) Mariano Garcete
(Uruguay) Peñarol	Montevideo	Estadio Charrúa	14,000	(Argentina) Leonardo Senatore	(Uruguay) Santiago Civetta
(United States) Raptors	Glendale, CO	Infinity Park	5,000	(United States) Mose Timoteo	(Argentina) Diego Fortuny

== Regular season ==
The regular season began on 17 February and ended on 27 May.

=== Standings ===
Standings at the conclusion of the 2024 Super Rugby Americas Season:

Pos.	Team	Season matches				Points			Tries		TBP	LBP	Table points
Pos.	Team	P	W	D	L	PF	PA	Diff.	TF	TA	TBP	LBP	Table points
1	Pampas	12	11	0	1	524	230	+294	73	33	10	1	55
2	Dogos	12	8	2	2	376	227	+149	54	24	6	2	44
3	Yacare	12	6	0	6	336	301	+35	43	40	5	3	32
4	Peñarol	12	5	1	6	291	316	–25	39	41	4	4	30
5	Selknam	12	5	1	6	288	321	–33	306	40	2	2	26
6	Raptors	12	3	0	9	222	443	–221	28	65	5	0	17
7	Cobras	12	2	0	10	226	425	–199	30	60	3	0	11

=== Matches ===
The following are the match results for the 2024 Super Rugby Americas regular season:

=== Round 1 ===
16 February	Dogos XV (Argentina)	56 - 8	(United States) American Raptors	Tala Rugby Club
				Referee: (Argentina) Nehuen Jauri Rivero

17 February	Cobras Brasil Rugby (Brazil)	15 - 13	(Uruguay) Peñarol Rugby	Estádio Du Cambusano
				Referee: (Argentina) Tomás Bertazza

17 February	Yacare XV (Paraguay)	32 - 48	(Argentina) Pampas	Héroes de Curupayty
				Referee: (Argentina) Damián Schneider

Bye: Selknam Rugby

=== Round 2 ===
23 February	Pampas (Argentina)	52 - 17	(United States) American Raptors	Club Newman
		https://www.rugbiers.cl/2024/02/24/raptors-no-fue-problema-para-pampas-en-el-inicio-de-la-segunda-date/		Referee: (Argentina) Pablo Deluca

24 February	Cobras Brasil Rugby (Brazil)	6 - 29	(Argentina) Dogos XV	Estádio Du Cambusano
		https://www.rugbiers.cl/2024/02/24/dogos-vencio-a-los-truenos-a-los-rayos-y-a-cobras-para-seguir-como-punteros/		Referee: (Argentina) Gonzalo Achával

24 February	Yacare XV (Paraguay)	34 - 20	(Chile) Selknam Rugby	Héroes de Curupayty
		https://www.rugbiers.cl/2024/02/24/40-minutos-iniciales-para-ilusionarse-40-finales-para-olvidar/		Referee: (Argentina) Simón Larrubia

Bye: Peñarol Rugby

=== Round 3 ===
1 March	Peñarol Rugby (Uruguay)	37 - 7	(United States) American Raptors	Estadio Charrúa
		https://www.rugbiers.cl/2024/03/01/date-3-los-carboneros-propinaron-su-tercera-derrota-a-raptors/		Referee: (Argentina) Gonzalo Achával

2 March	Cobras Brasil Rugby (Brazil)	20 - 30	(Chile) Selknam Rugby	Estadio Du Cambusano
		https://www.rugbiers.cl/2024/03/02/date-3-ante-cobras-con-una-solida-primera-etapa-selknam-logro-su-primera-victoria/		Referee: (Argentina) Simón Larrubia

2 March	Dogos XV (Argentina)	36 - 32	(Paraguay) Yacare XV	Tala Rugby Club
		https://www.rugbiers.cl/2024/03/02/date-3-tercera-victoria-de-dogos-ante-un-yacare-que-dio-dura-batalla-y-rescato-el-doble-bonus/		Referee: (Argentina) Nehuén Jauri Rivero

Bye: Pampas

=== Round 4 ===
8 March	Pampas (Argentina)	14 - 18	(Argentina) Dogos XV	Club Newman
		https://www.rugbiers.cl/2024/03/08/clasico-caliente-dogos-derroto-a-pampas-y-no-suelta-la-punta/		Referee: (Argentina) Pablo Deluca

9 March	Selknam Rugby (Chile)	23 - 25	(Uruguay) Peñarol Rugby	Estadio de La Pintana
		https://www.rugbiers.cl/2024/03/09/derrota-ante-penarol-en-la-ultima-jugada-se-escapo-el-triunfo-en-el-clasico/		Referee: (Argentina) Tomás Bertazza

9 March	Yacare XV (Paraguay)	51 - 7	(Brazil) Cobras Brasil Rugby	Héroes de Curupayty
		https://www.rugbiers.cl/2024/03/09/goleada-de-yacare-que-se-pone-como-escolta-de-dogos/		Referee: (Argentina) Mauro Rossi

Bye: American Raptors

=== Round 5 ===
15 March	Peñarol Rugby (Uruguay)	24 - 41	(Paraguay) Yacare XV	Estadio Charrúa
		https://www.rugbiers.cl/2024/03/15/yacare-no-solto-a-su-presa-gran-victoria-guarani-en-territorio-carbonero/		Referee: (Argentina) Jauri Rivero

16 March	Selknam Rugby (Chile)	19 - 41	(Argentina) Pampas	Estadio de La Pintana
		https://www.rugbiers.cl/2024/03/16/date-5-seis-minutos-de-lucidez-no-bastaron-para-vencer-a-pampas/		Referee: (Uruguay) Francisco González

17 March	American Raptors (United States)	29 - 21	(Brazil) Cobras Brasil Rugby	Infinity Park
		https://www.rugbiers.cl/2024/03/18/tecnico-nuevo-no-pierde-mose-timoteo-asumio-en-raptors-y-le-dio-su-primera-victoria/		Referee: (Argentina) Pablo Deluca

Bye: Dogos XV

=== Round 6 ===
22 March	Pampas (Argentina)	38 - 20	(Uruguay) Peñarol Rugby	La Catedral (CASI)
		https://uar.com.ar/el-compromiso-por-crecer-marca-el-camino/		Referee: (Argentina) Damian Shneider

23 March	Dogos XV (Argentina)	23 - 23	(Chile) Selknam Rugby	Tala Rugby Club
		https://www.rugbiers.cl/2024/03/23/infartante-empate-ante-dogos-se-peleo-hasta-el-final-y-se-obtuvo-el-premio/		Referee: (Argentina) Simon Larrubia

24 March	American Raptors (United States)	35 - 33	(Paraguay) Yacare XV	Infinity Park
		https://www.genrugby.com/index.php/paises/72-torneos/super-liga-americana-de-rugby/2937-american-raptors-35-33-yacare-xv-f6-sra-2024		Referee: (Uruguay) Francisco González

Bye: Cobras Brasil Rugby

=== Round 7 ===
5 April	Peñarol Rugby (Uruguay)	12 - 27	(Argentina) Dogos XV	Estadio Charrúa
		https://www.rugbiers.cl/2024/04/06/date-7-un-pack-imparable-resolvio-un-duro-partido-para-dogos/		Referee: (Argentina) Tomás Bertazza

6 April	Cobras Brasil Rugby (Brazil)	20 - 38	(Argentina) Pampas	Estádio Du Cambusano
		https://regi.superrugbyamericas.com/partido/20		Referee: (Argentina) Juan Manuel López

7 April	American Raptors (United States)	7 - 26	(Chile) Selknam Rugby	Infinity Park
		https://www.rugbiers.cl/2024/04/08/en-un-mas-que-aspero-partido-victoria-crucial-de-selknam-en-glendale-para-meterse-en-zona-de-play-off/		Referee: (Argentina) Gonzalo Achával

Bye: Yacare XV

=== Round 8 ===
12 April	Peñarol Rugby (Uruguay)	19 - 25	(Brazil) Cobras Brasil Rugby	Estadio Charrúa
		https://www.rugbiers.cl/2024/04/12/cobras-lo-volvio-a-hacer-y-ahondo-la-crisis-de-penarol/		Referee: (Chile) Frank Méndez

12 April	Pampas (Argentina)	22 - 12	(Paraguay) Yacare XV	La Catedral (CASI)
		https://www.rugbiers.cl/2024/04/13/bajo-la-lluvia-bonaerense-pampas-consolida-su-liderato-ante-yacare/		Referee: (Argentina) Gonzalo Achával

14 April	American Raptors (United States)	14 - 63	(Argentina) Dogos XV	Infinity Park
		https://www.lavoz.com.ar/deportes/rugby/dogos-xv-aplasto-63-14-a-american-raptors-en-estados-unidos-por-el-super-rugby-americas/		Referee: (Argentina) Nehuén Jauri Rivero

Bye: Selknam Rugby

=== Round 9 ===
20 April	Selknam Rugby (Chile)	39 - 15	(Paraguay) Yacare XV	Old Grangonian Club
		https://www.rugbiers.cl/2024/04/20/victoria-vital-para-selknam-sobre-yacare-xv-y-amenazar-el-tercer-puesto-de-los-paraguayos/		Referee: (Argentina) Damián Schneider

21 April	American Raptors (United States)	14 - 47	(Argentina) Pampas	Infinity Park
		https://uar.com.ar/pampas-hizo-pesar-su-favoritismo-y-se-llevo-la-victoria-en-su-away-a-glendale/		Referee: (Uruguay) Francisco González

21 April	Dogos XV (Argentina)	31 - 9	(Brazil) Cobras Brasil Rugby	Tala Rugby Club
		https://unioncordobesaderugby.com.ar/dogos-xv-y-una-nueva-victoria-que-lo-acerca-cada-vez-mas-al-objetivo/		Referee: (Argentina) Juan Manuel Martínez

Bye: Peñarol Rugby

=== Round 10 ===
27 April	Selknam Rugby (Chile)	43 - 15	(Brazil) Cobras Brasil Rugby	Old Grangonian Club
		https://www.rugbiers.cl/2024/04/27/selknam-sigue-en-racha-positiva-ahora-vencieron-a-cobras/		Referee: (Argentina) Mauro Rossi

27 April	Yacare XV (Paraguay)	22 - 19	(Argentina) Dogos XV	Héroes de Curupayty
		https://www.rugbiers.cl/2024/04/27/95258/		Referee: (Argentina) Tomás Bertazza

28 April	American Raptors (United States)	17 - 24	(Uruguay) Peñarol Rugby	Infinity Park
		https://www.rugbiers.cl/2024/04/28/penarol-y-un-triunfo-sobre-raptors-que-lo-mantiene-vivo/		Referee: (Argentina) Simón Larrubia

Bye: Pampas

=== Round 11 ===
3 May	Dogos XV (Argentina)	15 - 37	(Argentina) Pampas	Tala Rugby Club
		https://www.rugbiers.cl/2024/05/04/triunfo-y-liderato-para-pampas-y-clasificacion-para-ambos-a-semifinales/		Referee: (Argentina) Damián Schneider

3 May	Peñarol Rugby (Uruguay)	35 - 17	(Chile) Selknam Rugby	Estadio Charrúa
		https://www.rugbiers.cl/2024/05/04/duro-reves-penarol-fue-ampliamente-superior-y-saco-a-selknam-de-zona-de-play-off/		Referee: (Argentina) Pablo Deluca

4 May	Cobras Brasil Rugby (Brazil)	10 - 27	(Paraguay) Yacare XV	Estádio Du Cambusano
		https://www.espn.com.ar/rugby/nota/_/id/13611638/super-rugby-americas-cobras-brasil-rugby-yacare-xv-cronica-sintesis		Referee: (Argentina) Federico Solari

Bye: American Raptors

=== Round 12 ===
10 May	Pampas (Argentina)	54 - 0	(Chile) Selknam Rugby	La Catedral (CASI)
		https://www.lanacion.com.ar/deportes/rugby/pampas-arrollo-a-selknam-y-convirtio-a-dogos-xv-en-semifinalista-del-super-rugby-americas-nid10052024/		Referee: (Uruguay) Francisco González

11 May	Cobras Brasil Rugby (Brazil)	40 - 45	(United States) American Raptors	Estádio Du Cambusano
		http://espn.com.ar/rugby/nota/_/id/13643925/rugby-cronica-cobras-brasil-rugby-american-raptors-super-rugby-americas-date-12		Referee: (Chile) Frank Mendez

11 May	Yacare XV (Paraguay)	17 - 31	(Uruguay) Peñarol Rugby	Héroes de Curupayty
		https://mohicanosrugby.com/penarol-derroto-yacare-xv/		Referee: (Argentina) Juan Manuel López

Bye: Dogos XV

=== Round 13 ===
17 May	Peñarol Rugby (Uruguay)	25 - 63	(Argentina) Pampas	Estadio Charrúa
		https://www.aplenorugby.com.ar/site/america/pampas/78868/pampas-goleo-en-montevideo		Referee: (Argentina) Damián Schneider

18 May	Selknam Rugby (Chile)	24 - 33	(Argentina) Dogos XV	Old Grangonian Club
		https://www.rugbiers.cl/2024/05/18/selknam-cayo-ante-dogos-y-quedo-fuera-de-semifinales/		Referee: (Argentina) Tomás Bertazza

18 May	Yacare XV (Paraguay)	20 - 10	(United States) American Raptors	Héroes de Curupayty
		https://www.espn.com.gt/rugby/nota/_/id/13677652/super-rugby-americas-yacare-xv-vencio-20-10-a-american-raptors-cronica-sintesis		Referee: (Argentina) Nehuén Jauri Rivero

Bye: Cobras Brasil Rugby

=== Round 14 ===
24 May	Dogos XV (Argentina)	26 - 26	(Uruguay) Peñarol Rugby	Tala Rugby Club
		https://web.archive.org/web/20240525114943/https://www.unioncordobesaderugby.com.ar/es/2024/05/por-la-date-14-dogos-xv-y-penarol-no-se-sacaron-diferencias-en-cordoba/		Referee: (Argentina) Nehuén Jauri Rivero

24 May	Pampas (Argentina)	70 - 38	(Brazil) Cobras Brasil Rugby	La Catedral (CASI)
		https://www.tercertiemporugby.com.ar/un-triunfo-que-construye-de-cara-a-las-semifinales/		Referee: (Argentina) Gonzalo Achával

25 May	Selknam Rugby (Chile)	24 - 19	(United States) American Raptors	Old Grangonian Club
		https://www.rugbiers.cl/2024/05/25/selknam-se-despidio-con-un-trabajado-triunfo-sobre-raptors/		Referee: (Argentina) Mauro Rossi

Bye: Yacare XV

== Knockout stage ==
Semi-finals
7 June – Club Atlético San Isidro, Buenos Aires
Pampas	50
Peñarol	27
7 June – Tala Rugby Club, Córdoba
Dogos (a.e.t.)	17
Yacare	14

Final
15 June – Club Atlético San Isidro, Buenos Aires
Pampas	23
Dogos	37

=== Semi-finals ===
7 June 2024	Pampas (Argentina)	50 – 27	(Uruguay) Peñarol	Club Atlético San Isidro
19:15	Try: J de la Vega Mendía (12′), E Fourcade (18′), E Carullo (33′), R Gurovich (51′), S Pernas (55′), B Elizalde 2 (65′, 79′); Con: J de la Vega Mendía (19′, 34′, 52′, 56′, 66′, 80′); Pen: J de la Vega Mendía (16′)	Report	Try: M Diana (4′), S Civetta (46′), J Myszka (69′); Con: M Diana (4′), S Civetta (46′), J Myszka (69′); Pen: I Amarillo (29′, 43′)	Referee: Nehuen Jauri Rivero (ARG) Assistants: Frank Méndez (COL); Juan López (ARG) TMO: Lucas Galán (ARG

7 June 2024	Dogos (Argentina)	17 – 14 (a.e.t.)	(Paraguay) Yacare	Tala RC
21:38	Try: J Hernández (23′), L Gea Salim (69′); Con: J Hernández (24′, 70′); Pen: JB Baronio (87′)	Report	Try: A Zapata (49′); Pen: J Lamas (34′, 37′, 55′)	Referee: Tomas Bertazza (ARG) Assistants: Gonzalo de Archival (ARG); Juan Martínez (ARG) TMO: Marcelo Pilara (ARG)

=== Final ===
15 June 2024	Pampas (Argentina)	23 – 37	(Argentina) Dogos	Club Atlético San Isidro
16:37	Try: J Corvalán (18′), F Scaiano (80′); Con: J Corvalán (18′), F Scaiano (80′); Pen: J de la Vega Mendía (8′, 25′, 33′)	Report	Try: J de la Vega Mendía (8′, 25′, 33′); Con: J de la Vega Mendía (8′, 25′, 33′); Pen: J Hernández (5′), JB Baronio 5 (44′, 48′, 52′, 66′, 69′)	Referee: Damian Shneider (ARG) Assistants: Tomas Bertazza (ARG); Jauri Rivero (ARG) TMO: Lucas Galán (ARG)
