= Yacare XV =

(Paraguay) Yacare XV
- Full name: Yacare XV
- Founded: 2019; 7 years ago as Olimpia Lions
- Location: Asunción, Paraguay
- Ground: Estadio Héroes de Curupayty (Capacity: 3,000)
- Coach: Ramiro Pemán
- Captain: Ramiro Amarilla
- League: Super Rugby Americas
- 2025: 6th Playoffs: DNQ
1st kit	2nd kit

Yacare XV is a Paraguayan professional rugby union team based in Asunción. The team was founded in 2019 as Olimpia Lions to compete in Súper Liga Americana de Rugby. Olimpia Lions was an offshoot of the Club Olimpia sports club.

The team was re-branded ahead of the 2023 Super Rugby Americas season as "Yacare XV".

The team's name and logo image are based on yacare caiman, a mid-size species of caiman native to Paraguay, Argentina, Bolivia and adjacent parts of Brazil.

== Stadium ==
Yacare XV plays at the "Estadio Héroes de Curupayty" in Luque which has recently been renovated with a new playing surface in preparation for professional rugby.

== Current squad ==
The Yacare XV squad for the 2026 Super Rugby Americas season is:

2026 Yacare XV squad
**Props**: (Paraguay) **Estefano Aranda**; (Paraguay) **Camilo Blasco**; (Argentina) Gonzalo Del Pazo; (Paraguay) **Cesar Perez**; (Paraguay) **Enrique Quinteros**; (Argentina) Rodolfo Rivadeneira; (Paraguay) **Gaston Salvi**; (Argentina) Nicolas Toth; **Hookers**: (Paraguay) **Agustín Benítez**; (Paraguay) **Jordi Chavez**; (Argentina) Valentino Marciali; **Locks**: (Argentina) Joaquín Domínguez; (Argentina) Mateo Gasparotti; (Argentina) Lautaro Gonzalez; (Paraguay) **Juan José Heisecke**; (Paraguay) Nahuel Kacerosky	**Back row**: (Paraguay) **Francisco Bareiro**; (Argentina) Juan Mernes; (Argentina) Matías Muniagurria; (Paraguay) **Ariel Nuñez**; (Paraguay) **Carlos Plate**; (Argentina) Rodrigo Robadin; (Paraguay) **Juan Martin Sebriano**; (Argentina) Manuel Todaro; (Paraguay) Santiago Villalba; **Scrum-halves**: (Paraguay) **Gonzalo Bareiro**; (Paraguay) **Diego Miño**; (Argentina) Juan Cruz Strada; (Paraguay) Ignacio Vega; **Fly-halves**: (Argentina) Joaquín Lamas; (Paraguay) **Joaquín Mussi**; (Argentina) Valentino Quattrocchi	**Centres**: (Paraguay) **Ramiro Amarilla** **(c)**; (Paraguay) **Rafael Bareiro**; (Argentina) Francisco Gaspes; (Paraguay) **Sebastián Urbieta**; **Wings**: (Paraguay) **Juan González**; (Paraguay) Alejandro Heyn; (Paraguay) **Arturo López**; (Paraguay) **Gianfranco Parodi**; **Fullbacks**: (Argentina) Francisco Calello; (Paraguay) **Facundo Paiva**
**(c)** denotes the team captain. **Bold** denotes internationally capped players. * denotes players qualified to play for Paraguay on residency or dual nationality. Source:

== Records ==
=== Season standings in Super Rugby Americas ===
Ed.	Season	Venue	Host city	Regular stage position	Playoffs position
1	2020	(Not completed due to the COVID-19 pandemic).			
2	2021	Estadio Charrúa	Montevideo	4th	Semi-finalist
3	2022	Estadio Charrúa	Montevideo	5th	—N/a
4	2023	Estadio Charrúa	Montevideo	4th	Semi-finalist
5	2024	Tala Rugby Club	Córdoba	4th	Semi-finalist
