= Pampas XV =

(Argentina) Pampas XV
- Full name: Pampas XV
- Union: Argentine Rugby Union
- Founded: 2010; 16 years ago
- Region: Buenos Aires, Argentina
- Ground(s): Estadio del CASI, San Isidro (Capacity: 4,500)
- Coach: Juan Manuel Leguizamón
- Captain: Juan Cruz Pérez Rachel
- League: Super Rugby Americas
- 2025: 1st Playoffs: Semi-finalist
kit	2nd kit

Official website
- uar.com.ar/pampas

Pampas XV is an Argentine professional rugby union team that currently competes in Super Rugby Americas.

In the past it participated in the South African second domestic competition, the Vodacom Cup between 2010 and 2013. The team was established in 2010 and was composed almost entirely by members of the High Performance Plan of the UAR. It was an unofficial third national team, below the Senior squad (Los Pumas) and Argentina XV, although it has been described as the second team as well.

From 2010 to 2015, Pampas XV won one Vodacom Cup and two Pacific Rugby Cup titles. In 2023, the franchise returned to the field, making their debut at Super Rugby Americas in replacement of Jaguares.

== History ==
The team played in the Southern Section of the Vodacom Cup. In 2010, these teams had to play against other teams in the Southern Section, so the Pampas XV were based in the Stellenbosch area. Their first season was average though, winning 3 matches and losing as many whilst drawing one match. They finished fifth in their conference and failed to qualify for the knockout rounds. However, in 2011 all the teams in the Southern Section had to play against teams in the Northern Section, so they relocated to Olën Park, Potchefstroom.

The first title for Pampas XV came in 2011 when the team won the Vodacom Cup beating Blue Bulls at the final. The squad also went through the season undefeated, passing 40 points in 5 of their 11 matches. Juan Imhoff finished the season as the tournament's top try scorer. That achievement was also the first title won by an Argentine team in a professional competition.

During the 2012 and 2013 competitions, the Pampas XV played at the A.F. Markötter Stadium at Paul Roos Gymnasium in Stellenbosch.

In November 2013, Pampas XV withdrew from the Vodacom Cup thus not competing in the 2014 edition of the competition due to financial considerations. However, in December 2013, it was announced that the Argentine third team would join the Pacific Rugby Cup, where they would face the likes of Fiji Warriors, Samoa A, Tonga A, Junior Japan plus Australian Super Rugby Academy Teams.

The year of their debut in the Pacific Rugby Cup, Pampas XV crowned champions of the tournament when they defeated local team Reds A by 36–21 in Sydney.

The second title for the Pampas XV came in 2015, when they won their second Pacific Cup consecutive title, defeating Fiji Warriors by 17–9. The squad also finished the tournament unbeaten. That same year, the team was dissolved until his reconstitution in 2022 in order to participate at new Super Rugby Americas from 2023.

=== Super Rugby Americas ===
In 2022, it was announced that Pampas XV would be the second Argentine franchise (along with Dogos XV) at Super Rugby Americas championship, replacing Jaguares. Therefore Pampas made their debut at the competition in the 2023 season.

Based in Buenos Aires the team brings symbolic connection with Buenos Aires squad which won the Campeonato Argentino 37 times, the last in 2017.

In 2026, the Pampas won their first championship in Super Rugby Americas, defeating Dogos XV 26-17.

== Current squad ==
The Pampas XV squad for the 2026 Super Rugby Americas season is:

2026 Pampas XV squad
**Props**: (Argentina) Ramiro Berardi; (Argentina) Marcos Camerlinckx; (Argentina) Fabrizio Cebrón; (Argentina) Ezequiel Gómez Cofre; (Argentina) Matías Medrano; (Argentina) Valentín Vicente; (Argentina) Nahuel Zunini; **Hookers**: (Argentina) Ignacio Bottazzini; (Argentina) Nicolás Cambiasso; (Argentina) Tadeo Ledesma; (Argentina) Francisco Lusarreta; **Locks**: (Argentina) Jeremy Annand; (Argentina) Santos Cayol; (Argentina) Rodrigo Fernández Criado; (Argentina) Tiziano Rocha; (Argentina) Francisco Sluga; (Argentina) Marcelo Toledo	**Back row**: (Argentina) Juan Pedro Bernasconi; (Argentina) Augusto Cabano Wall; (Argentina) Lucas Moresco; (Argentina) Joaquín Pascual Viale; (Argentina) Juan Penoucos; (Argentina) Juan Cruz Pérez Rachel **(c)**; (Argentina) Faustino Santarelli; (Argentina) Jerónimo Sorondo; **Scrum-halves**: (Argentina) Alejo Lavayén; (Argentina) Ramiro Manzo; (Argentina) Lucas Marguery; (Argentina) Valentino Reggiardo; **Fly-halves**: (Argentina) Bautista Farisé; (Argentina) Ramiro Fernández Miranda; (Argentina) Estanislao Renthel; (Argentina) Federico Serpa	**Centres**: (Argentina) Juan Cruz Corso; (Argentina) Agustín Fraga; (Argentina) Santino García Mortola; (Argentina) Felipe Ledesma; **Wings**: (Argentina) Nahuel Clausen; (Argentina) Ignacio Díaz; (Argentina) Alfonso Latorre; (Argentina) **Santiago Pernas**; (Argentina) Jerónimo Ulloa; **Fullbacks**: (Argentina) **Santiago Cordero**; (Argentina) Danilo Ghisolfi; (Argentina) Tobías Wade
**(c)** denotes the team captain. **Bold** denotes internationally capped players. * denotes players qualified to play for Argentina on residency or dual nationality. Source:

== Honours ==
- Vodacom Cup (1): 2011
- World Rugby Pacific Challenge (2): 2014, 2015
- Super Rugby Americas:
  - Champions (1): 2026
  - Runners-Up (1): 2024
