= Dogos XV =

(Argentina) Dogos
- Full name: Dogos XV
- Founded: 2019; 7 years ago as Ceibos
- Ground: Tala Rugby Club Stadium (Capacity: 6,000)
- Coach: Diego Ghiglione
- Captain: Valentín Cabral
- League: Super Rugby Americas
- 2025: 3rd Playoffs: Runners-up
Team kit

Dogos XV is a professional rugby union team based in Cordoba, Argentina. The team was founded in 2019 as Ceibos to compete in Súper Liga Americana de Rugby and was Argentina's second professional franchise. The team was disbanded ahead of the 2021 season, following Argentina Rugby's decision to play the Jaguares XV in the competition, following the team's departure from Super Rugby.

The team was rebranded for the 2023 Super Rugby Americas season as "Dogos XV", and controlled by the Unión Cordobesa de Rugby (Córdoba Rugby Union).

It also participated in a cross-border competition in November 2022 against Brazil XV, Paraguay XV and Tucumán.

Dogos is also the name of Córdoba's provincial team, which won the Campeonato Argentino 7 times, the last in 2012.

== Stadium ==
In 2020, a permanent home stadium for Ceibos was not formally announced, but the Ceibos played two preseason matches scheduled at Barrio Los Boulevares in Cordoba, Argentina.

From 2023 the home stadium is shared with that of Tala Rugby Club.

Prior to the 2025 season, it was announced that Dogos would be switching their home venue to Córdoba Athletic Club.

== Current squad ==
The Dogos XV squad for the 2026 Super Rugby Americas season is:

2026 Dogos XV squad
**Props**: (Argentina) Juan Francisco Aguirre; (Argentina) Ezequiel Bustos; (Argentina) Luca Dugo; (Argentina) Galo Fernández; (Argentina) Octavio Filippa; (Argentina) Baltazar Monforte; (Argentina) Nicolás Revol Pitt; (Argentina) Bautista Salinas; **Hookers**: (Argentina) Juan Greising Revol; (Argentina) Ramiro Iglesias; (Argentina) Tomás Montilla; (Argentina) Alejandro Pronce; (Argentina) Nicanor Rins; **Locks**: (Argentina) Abraham Elías; (Argentina) Valentín González; (Argentina) Enzo Ocampo; (Argentina) Lautaro Simes; (Argentina) Benjamín Vázquez	**Back row**: (Argentina) Aitor Bildosola; (Argentina) Valentín Cabral **(c)**; (Argentina) Augusto Cugnini; (Argentina) Genaro Fissore; (Argentina) Gastón Garayzábal; (Argentina) Tomás Gómez González; (Argentina) Federico Rolotti; (Argentina) Lucio Willington; **Scrum-halves**: (Argentina) Fabricio Griffo; (Argentina) Constantino Keller; (Argentina) Genaro Podestá; (Argentina) Nicolás Viola; **Fly-halves**: (Argentina) Giuliano Avaca; (Argentina) Manuel Giannantonio; (Argentina) Julián Hernández; (Argentina) Facundo Rodriguez; (Argentina) **Nicolás Roger**	**Centres**: (Argentina) Tomás Canedo; (Argentina) Leonardo Gea Salim; (Argentina) Mauricio Kember; (Argentina) **Faustino Sánchez Valarolo**; (Argentina) Agustín Segura; **Wings**: (Argentina) Manuel Carrara; (Argentina) Bautista Fernández Pugliese; (Argentina) Ernesto Giudice; (Argentina) Facundo Pueyrredón; (Argentina) Mateo Soler; **Fullbacks**: (Argentina) Luciano Avaca; (Argentina) Agustín de Vértiz; (Argentina) Mateo Sánchez
**(c)** denotes the team captain. **Bold** denotes internationally capped players. * denotes players qualified to play for Argentina on residency or dual nationality. Source:

== Honours ==
- Cross Border Competition (1): 2022
- Super Rugby Americas:
  - Champions (1): 2024
  - Runners-up (2): 2023, 2026
