= 2025 Rugby Championship =

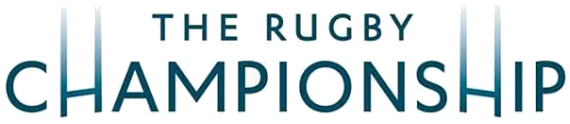
- Date: 16 August – 4 October 2025
- Countries: Argentina; Australia; New Zealand; South Africa

Final positions
- Champions: South Africa (6th title)
- Bledisloe Cup: New Zealand
- Freedom Cup: South Africa
- Mandela Challenge Plate: South Africa
- Puma Trophy: Argentina

Tournament statistics
- Matches played: 12
- Tries scored: 83 (6.92 per match)
- Attendance: 581,093 (48,424 per match)
- Top scorer(s): Santiago Carreras (72)
- Most tries: Malcolm Marx (4); Joseph Sua'ali'i (4)

The 2025 Rugby Championship (Note: The competition is known as the Lipovitan-D Rugby Championship in New Zealand, the Castle Lager Rugby Championship in South Africa and the Flight Centre Rugby Championship in Australia, for sponsorship reasons.) was the fourteenth edition of the annual Southern Hemisphere rugby union competition, organised by SANZAAR, featuring the men's national teams of Argentina, Australia, New Zealand and South Africa.

South Africa entered the competition as the defending champions, and kicked off the tournament against Australia on 16 August. The three traditional unions, also known as the Tri-Nations, announced their 2025 home fixtures in November and December 2024. A notable fixture is set to be played between Argentina and South Africa in the final round at Twickenham Stadium in London, exactly one week after the 2025 Women's Rugby World Cup final. It is the second time a Rugby Championship match has been played at Twickenham Stadium, after Argentina played Australia during the 2016 Rugby Championship. It was also the last Rugby Championship before the beginning of the Nations Championship, and its last before its 2026 hiatus.

South Africa won the competition in the final round of the tournament, defeating Argentina 29–27 in London on 4 October, securing their sixth Rugby Championship title.

== Table ==
Pos	Team	Pld	W	D	L	PF	PA	PD	TF	TA	TB	LB	Pts
1	South Africa	6	4	0	2	208	151	+57	27	19	2	1	19
2	New Zealand	6	4	0	2	159	151	+8	21	17	2	1	19
3	Australia	6	2	0	4	152	165	−13	21	17	2	1	11
4	Argentina	6	2	0	4	162	214	−52	14	30	0	2	10

Source: SANZAAR

== Fixtures ==
=== Round 1 ===
16 August 2025
17:10 SAST (UTC+02)

South Africa	22–38	Australia (1 BP)
Try: Arendse 1' c Esterhuizen 12' m Kolisi 17' c Con: Libbok (2/3) 2', 18'; Pen: Libbok (1/1) 8'	Report	Try: Pietsch 28' m Wilson (2) 42' c, 63' c Sua'ali'i 57' c Jorgensen 65' c Wright 75' m Con: O'Connor (4/6) 43', 58', 64', 66'

Ellis Park Stadium, Johannesburg
Attendance: 51,327
Referee: Ben O'Keeffe (New Zealand)

FB	15	Aphelele Fassi	(substituted off) 51'
RW	14	Edwill van der Merwe	(substituted off) 58'
OC	13	Jesse Kriel
IC	12	André Esterhuizen
LW	11	Kurt-Lee Arendse	(substituted off) 67'
FH	10	Manie Libbok
SH	9	Grant Williams
N8	8	Siya Kolisi (c)			(substituted off) 45'
BF	7	Pieter-Steph du Toit
OF	6	Marco van Staden	(substituted off) 18'	(substituted on) 30'
RL	5	Lood de Jager	(substituted off) 45'
LL	4	Eben Etzebeth
TP	3	Wilco Louw	(substituted off) 58'
HK	2	Malcolm Marx	(substituted off) 58'
LP	1	Ox Nché	(substituted off) 58'
Substitutions:
HK	16	Bongi Mbonambi	(substituted on) 58'
PR	17	Boan Venter	(substituted on) 58'
PR	18	Asenathi Ntlabakanye	(substituted on) 58'
LK	19	Franco Mostert	(substituted on) 45'
FL	20	Kwagga Smith	(substituted on) 18'	(substituted off) 30'	(substituted on) 45'
SH	21	Cobus Reinach	(substituted on) 67'
WG	22	Canan Moodie	(substituted on) 58'
FH	23	Damian Willemse	(substituted on) 51'
Coach:
Rassie Erasmus

FB	15	Tom Wright
RW	14	Max Jorgensen
OC	13	Joseph Sua'ali'i
IC	12	Len Ikitau	(substituted off) 48'	(substituted on) 67'
LW	11	Dylan Pietsch	(substituted off) 31'
FH	10	James O'Connor
SH	9	Nic White		(substituted off) 67'
N8	8	Harry Wilson (c)	(substituted off) 64'
OF	7	Fraser McReight
BF	6	Tom Hooper
RL	5	Will Skelton	(substituted off) 56'
LL	4	Nick Frost
TP	3	Taniela Tupou	(substituted off) 40'
HK	2	Billy Pollard	(substituted off) 66'
LP	1	James Slipper	(substituted off) 40'
Substitutions:
HK	16	Brandon Paenga-Amosa	(substituted on) 66'
PR	17	Angus Bell	(substituted on) 40'
PR	18	Zane Nonggorr	(substituted on) 40'
LK	19	Jeremy Williams	(substituted on) 56'
FL	20	Langi Gleeson	(substituted on) 64'
SH	21	Tate McDermott	(substituted on) 48'
FH	22	Tane Edmed
WG	23	Andrew Kellaway	(substituted on) 31'
Coach:
Joe Schmidt

Player of the Match:
Fraser McReight (Australia)

Assistant referees:
James Doleman (New Zealand)
Gianluca Gnecchi (Italy)
Television match official:
Tual Trainini (France)
Foul play review officer:
Richard Kelly (New Zealand)

Notes:

- Australia won their first test on South African home soil for the first time since their 14–9 victory in the 2011 Tri Nations, and win at Ellis Park for the first time since 1963.
- This was South Africa's first loss at home in The Rugby Championship since losing to New Zealand in 2022.

16 August 2025
18:10 ART (UTC−03)

Argentina	24–41	New Zealand (1 BP)
Try: Isgró 15' c Albornoz 50' c Oviedo 63' c Con: Albornoz (3/3) 16', 50', 64'; Pen: Albornoz (1/2) 29'	Report	Try: Reece (2) 8' c, 40+2' c Ratima 23' c Savea 36' c Taukei'aho (2) 68' m, 73' m Con: B. Barrett (4/6) 9', 24', 37', 40+3'; Pen: B. Barrett (1/1) 3'

Estadio Mario Alberto Kempes, Córdoba
Attendance: 55,740
Referee: Pierre Brousset (France)

FB	15	Juan Cruz Mallía
RW	14	Rodrigo Isgró		(substituted off) 50'
OC	13	Lucio Cinti
IC	12	Santiago Chocobares		(substituted off) 74'
LW	11	Bautista Delguy		(substituted off) 18'	(substituted on) 27'
FH	10	Tomás Albornoz
SH	9	Gonzalo García		(substituted off) 63'
N8	8	Joaquín Oviedo
OF	7	Marcos Kremer		(substituted off) 50'
BF	6	Pablo Matera
RL	5	Pedro Rubiolo
LL	4	Franco Molina		(substituted off) 50'
TP	3	Pedro Delgado		(substituted off) 46'
HK	2	Julián Montoya (c)		(substituted off) 63'
LP	1	Mayco Vivas	(yellow card) 17'			(substituted off) 46'
Substitutions:
HK	16	Ignacio Ruiz		(substituted on) 63'
PR	17	Nahuel Tetaz Chaparro		(substituted on) 18'	(substituted off) 27'	(substituted on) 46'
PR	18	Joel Sclavi		(substituted on) 46'
LK	19	Guido Petti		(substituted on) 50'
FL	20	Juan Martín González		(substituted on) 50'
SH	21	Simón Benítez Cruz		(substituted on) 63'
FH	22	Santiago Carreras		(substituted on) 50'
CE	23	Justo Piccardo		(substituted on) 74'
Coach:
Felipe Contepomi

FB	15	Will Jordan
RW	14	Sevu Reece		(substituted off) 55'
OC	13	Billy Proctor	(yellow card) 58'	(substituted off) 68'
IC	12	Jordie Barrett
LW	11	Rieko Ioane
FH	10	Beauden Barrett
SH	9	Cortez Ratima		(substituted off) 49'
N8	8	Ardie Savea
OF	7	Du'Plessis Kirifi
BF	6	Tupou Vaa'i
RL	5	Fabian Holland		(substituted off) 71'
LL	4	Scott Barrett (c)		(substituted off) 55'
TP	3	Fletcher Newell		(substituted off) 49'
HK	2	Codie Taylor		(substituted off) 49'
LP	1	Ethan de Groot		(substituted off) 49'
Substitutions:
HK	16	Samisoni Taukei'aho		(substituted on) 49'
PR	17	Ollie Norris		(substituted on) 49'
PR	18	Pasilio Tosi		(substituted on) 49'
LK	19	Patrick Tuipulotu		(substituted on) 55'
FL	20	Samipeni Finau		(substituted on) 71'
SH	21	Finlay Christie		(substituted on) 49'
CE	22	Anton Lienert-Brown	(yellow card) 77'	(substituted on) 68'
FH	23	Damian McKenzie		(substituted on) 55'
Coach:
Scott Robertson

Player of the Match:
Sevu Reece (New Zealand)

Assistant referees:
Nic Berry (Australia)
Morné Ferreira (South Africa)
Television match official:
Marius van der Westhuizen (South Africa)
Foul play review officer:
Damon Murphy (Australia)

Notes:

- Argentina's score (24) was the most points they have scored at home against New Zealand, and surpassed their previous high of 21 set in 1985.
- With this win, and the loss for South Africa, New Zealand moved to 1st place on the World Rugby Rankings for the first time since November 2021.

=== Round 2 ===
23 August 2025
17:10 SAST (UTC+02)

South Africa	30–22	Australia
Try: Moodie 10' c Smith 34' c Etzebeth 73' c Con: Pollard (3/3) 11', 35', 74'; Pen: Pollard (3/3) 1', 5', 56'	Report	Try: Toole 7' c Jorgensen 46' c Paenga-Amosa 67' m Con: O'Connor (2/3) 8', 47'; Pen: O'Connor (1/3) 40'

DHL Stadium, Cape Town
Attendance: 56,350
Referee: James Doleman (New Zealand)

FB	15	Aphelele Fassi	(yellow card) 79'
RW	14	Canan Moodie		(substituted off) 54'
OC	13	Jesse Kriel (c)
IC	12	Damian de Allende
LW	11	Cheslin Kolbe
FH	10	Handré Pollard
SH	9	Grant Williams		(substituted off) 60'
N8	8	Kwagga Smith
BF	7	Franco Mostert		(substituted off) 66'
OF	6	Marco van Staden
RL	5	Ruan Nortjé		(substituted off) 44'
LL	4	RG Snyman		(substituted off) 44'
TP	3	Thomas du Toit		(substituted off) 63'
HK	2	Malcolm Marx		(substituted off) 78'
LP	1	Ox Nché		(substituted off) 70'
Substitutions:
HK	16	Marnus van der Merwe		(substituted on) 78'
PR	17	Boan Venter		(substituted on) 70'
PR	18	Wilco Louw		(substituted on) 63'
LK	19	Eben Etzebeth		(substituted on) 44'
LK	20	Lood de Jager		(substituted on) 44'
CE	21	André Esterhuizen		(substituted on) 66'
SH	22	Cobus Reinach		(substituted on) 60'
FH	23	Sacha Feinberg-Mngomezulu		(substituted on) 54'
Coach:
Rassie Erasmus

FB	15	Tom Wright	(substituted off) 3'
RW	14	Max Jorgensen
OC	13	Joseph Sua'ali'i	(substituted off) 40'
IC	12	Len Ikitau
LW	11	Corey Toole
FH	10	James O'Connor
SH	9	Nic White	(substituted off) 12'
N8	8	Rob Valetini
OF	7	Fraser McReight (c)
BF	6	Tom Hooper	(substituted off) 74'
RL	5	Will Skelton	(substituted off) 47'
LL	4	Nick Frost
TP	3	Taniela Tupou	(substituted off) 52'
HK	2	Billy Pollard	(substituted off) 63'
LP	1	Tom Robertson	(substituted off) 48'
Substitutions:
HK	16	Brandon Paenga-Amosa	(substituted on) 63'
PR	17	Angus Bell	(substituted on) 48'
PR	18	Zane Nonggorr	(substituted on) 52'
LK	19	Jeremy Williams	(substituted on) 47'
FL	20	Nick Champion de Crespigny	(substituted on) 74'
SH	21	Tate McDermott	(substituted on) 12'
FH	22	Tane Edmed	(substituted on) 40'
WG	23	Andrew Kellaway	(substituted on) 3'
Coach:
Joe Schmidt

Player of the Match:
Handré Pollard (South Africa)

Assistant referees:
Andrew Brace (Ireland)
Gianluca Gnecchi (Italy)
Television match official:
Richard Kelly (New Zealand)
Foul play review officer:
Tual Trainini (France)

Notes:

- Corey Toole (Australia) made his international debut.
- South Africa retained the Mandela Challenge Plate.

23 August 2025
18:10 ART (UTC−03)

Argentina	29–23	New Zealand (1 BP)
Try: González 32' c García 58' c Con: S. Carreras (2/2) 33', 59'; Pen: Albornoz (1/2) 2'; Mallía (1/1) 14'; S. Carreras (3/3) 51', 55', 74'	Report	Try: Proctor 19' m Newell 25' m Taukei'aho 68'c Con: B. Barrett (0/2); McKenzie (1/1) 69'; Pen: B. Barrett (1/2) 11'; McKenzie (1/1) 80+1'

José Amalfitani Stadium, Buenos Aires
Attendance: 48,000
Referee: Nic Berry (Australia)

FB	15	Juan Cruz Mallía
RW	14	Bautista Delguy
OC	13	Lucio Cinti
IC	12	Santiago Chocobares	(substituted off) 20'	(substituted on) 31'	(substituted off) 79'
LW	11	Mateo Carreras
FH	10	Tomás Albornoz	(substituted off) 13'
SH	9	Gonzalo García	(substituted off) 61'
N8	8	Joaquín Oviedo	(substituted off) 45'
OF	7	Juan Martín González
BF	6	Pablo Matera
RL	5	Pedro Rubiolo
LL	4	Franco Molina	(substituted off) 45'
TP	3	Pedro Delgado	(substituted off) 45'
HK	2	Julián Montoya (c)	(substituted off) 74'
LP	1	Mayco Vivas	(substituted off) 45'
Substitutions:
HK	16	Ignacio Ruiz	(substituted on) 74'
PR	17	Nahuel Tetaz Chaparro	(substituted on) 45'
PR	18	Joel Sclavi	(substituted on) 45'
LK	19	Guido Petti	(substituted on) 45'
FL	20	Marcos Kremer	(substituted on) 45'
SH	21	Simón Benítez Cruz	(substituted on) 61'
FH	22	Santiago Carreras	(substituted on) 13'
CE	23	Justo Piccardo	(substituted on) 20'	(substituted off) 31'	(substituted on) 79'
Coach:
Felipe Contepomi

FB	15	Will Jordan	(yellow card) 30'
RW	14	Sevu Reece	(yellow card) 73'
OC	13	Billy Proctor		(substituted off) 59'
IC	12	Jordie Barrett
LW	11	Rieko Ioane
FH	10	Beauden Barrett		(substituted off) 56'
SH	9	Cortez Ratima		(substituted off) 18'
N8	8	Simon Parker		(substituted off) 51'
OF	7	Ardie Savea
BF	6	Tupou Vaa'i	(yellow card) 32'
RL	5	Fabian Holland		(substituted off) 69'
LL	4	Scott Barrett (c)
TP	3	Fletcher Newell		(substituted off) 56'
HK	2	Codie Taylor		(substituted off) 51'
LP	1	Ethan de Groot		(substituted off) 40'
Substitutions:
HK	16	Samisoni Taukei'aho		(substituted on) 51'
PR	17	Tamaiti Williams		(substituted on) 40'
PR	18	Pasilio Tosi		(substituted on) 56'
LK	19	Josh Lord		(substituted on) 69'
FL	20	Wallace Sititi		(substituted on) 51'
SH	21	Finlay Christie		(substituted on) 18'
CE	22	Quinn Tupaea		(substituted on) 59'
FH	23	Damian McKenzie		(substituted on) 56'
Coach:
Scott Robertson

Player of the Match:
Pablo Matera (Argentina)

Assistant referees:
Pierre Brousset (France)
Morné Ferreira (South Africa)
Television match official:
Marius van der Westhuizen ((South Africa)
Foul play review officer:
Damon Murphy (Australia)

Notes:

- Simon Parker (New Zealand) made his international debut.
- Codie Taylor (New Zealand) earnt his 100th test cap, and became the fourteenth male New Zealand player to do so.
- This was Argentina's first home win over New Zealand, completing the treble of beating New Zealand on neutral ground and in New Zealand. This was New Zealand's first loss to Argentina outside of New Zealand, since their 15–25 loss at Sydney's Western Sydney Stadium in 2020.
- Argentina's score (29) was the most points they have scored at home against New Zealand, and surpassed their previous high of 24 set just a week earlier in the first round of the 2025 Rugby Championship.

=== Round 3 ===
6 September 2025
14:30 AEST (UTC+10)

Australia	28–24	Argentina (1 BP)
Try: White 22' c Sua'ali'i (2) 46' c, 62' c Bell 80+5' c Con: Lynagh (2/2) 25', 47'; O'Connor (2/2) 67', 80+6'	Report	Try: Delguy 28' m M. Carreras 32' c Con: S. Carreras (1/2) 32'; Pen: S. Carreras (3/3) 4', 11', 35'; Mallía (1/1) 78'

North Queensland Stadium, Townsville
Attendance: 20,163
Referee: Paul Williams (New Zealand)

FB	15	Andrew Kellaway
RW	14	Max Jorgensen
OC	13	Joseph Sua'ali'i
IC	12	Len Ikitau
LW	11	Corey Toole
FH	10	Tom Lynagh	(substituted off) 56'
SH	9	Nic White	(substituted off) 47'
N8	8	Harry Wilson (c)
OF	7	Fraser McReight
BF	6	Rob Valetini	(substituted off) 60'
RL	5	Tom Hooper
LL	4	Nick Frost	(substituted off) 60'
TP	3	Taniela Tupou	(substituted off) 40'
HK	2	Billy Pollard	(substituted off) 59'
LP	1	Tom Robertson	(substituted off) 40'
Substitutions:
HK	16	Brandon Paenga-Amosa	(substituted on) 59'
PR	17	Angus Bell	(substituted on) 40'
PR	18	Zane Nonggorr	(substituted on) 40'
LK	19	Jeremy Williams	(substituted on) 60'
FL	20	Carlo Tizzano	(substituted on) 60'
SH	21	Tate McDermott	(substituted on) 47'
FH	22	James O'Connor	(substituted on) 56'
WG	23	Filipo Daugunu
Coach:
Joe Schmidt

FB	15	Juan Cruz Mallía
RW	14	Bautista Delguy
OC	13	Lucio Cinti		(substituted off) 49'
IC	12	Santiago Chocobares
LW	11	Mateo Carreras	(yellow card) 61'
FH	10	Santiago Carreras		(substituted off) 73'
SH	9	Gonzalo García		(substituted off) 63'
N8	8	Pablo Matera		(substituted off) 49'
OF	7	Marcos Kremer
BF	6	Juan Martín González
RL	5	Pedro Rubiolo
LL	4	Franco Molina		(substituted off) 18'	(substituted on) 29'	(substituted off) 49'
TP	3	Joel Sclavi		(substituted off) 49'
HK	2	Julián Montoya (c)		(substituted off) 73'
LP	1	Mayco Vivas		(substituted off) 62'
Substitutions:
HK	16	Ignacio Ruiz		(substituted on) 73'
PR	17	Boris Wenger		(substituted on) 62'
PR	18	Francisco Coria Marchetti		(substituted on) 49'
LK	19	Guido Petti		(substituted on) 18'	(substituted off) 29'	(substituted on) 49'
FL	20	Joaquín Oviedo		(substituted on) 49'
SH	21	Agustín Moyano		(substituted on) 63'
FH	22	Gerónimo Prisciantelli		(substituted on) 73'
FB	23	Benjamín Elizalde		(substituted on) 49'
Coach:
Felipe Contepomi

Player of the Match:
Angus Bell (Australia)

Assistant referees:
Christophe Ridley (England)
Sam Grove-White (Scotland)
Television match official:
Mike Adamson (Scotland)
Foul play review officer:
Glenn Newman (New Zealand)

Notes:

- Gerónimo Prisciantelli (Argentina) made his international debut.

6 September 2025
19:05 NZST (UTC+12)

New Zealand	24–17	South Africa (1 BP)
Try: Narawa 2' c Jordan 17' c Tupaea 67' c Con: J. Barrett (1/1) 3'; McKenzie (2/2) 18', 68'; Pen: McKenzie (1/1) 51'	Report	Try: Marx 62' c Reinach 74' c Con: Feinberg-Mngomezulu (2/2) 63', 75'; Pen: Pollard (1/2) 23'

Eden Park, Auckland
Attendance: 48,312
Referee: Karl Dickson (England)

FB	15	Will Jordan
RW	14	Emoni Narawa	(substituted off) 7'
OC	13	Billy Proctor	(substituted off) 72'
IC	12	Jordie Barrett	(substituted off) 60'	(substituted on) 72'
LW	11	Rieko Ioane
FH	10	Beauden Barrett
SH	9	Finlay Christie	(substituted off) 68'
N8	8	Wallace Sititi	(substituted off) 46'	(substituted on) 59'	(substituted off) 73'
OF	7	Ardie Savea
BF	6	Simon Parker	(substituted off) 68'
RL	5	Tupou Vaa'i
LL	4	Scott Barrett (c)
TP	3	Fletcher Newell	(substituted off) 46'
HK	2	Codie Taylor	(substituted off) 32'
LP	1	Ethan de Groot	(substituted off) 40'
Substitutions:
HK	16	Samisoni Taukei'aho	(substituted on) 32'
PR	17	Tamaiti Williams	(substituted on) 40'
PR	18	Tyrel Lomax	(substituted on) 46'
LK	19	Fabian Holland	(substituted on) 68'
FL	20	Du'Plessis Kirifi	(substituted on) 46'	(substituted off) 59'	(substituted on) 73'
SH	21	Kyle Preston	(substituted on) 68'
CE	22	Quinn Tupaea	(substituted on) 60'
FH	23	Damian McKenzie	(substituted on) 7'
Coach:
Scott Robertson

FB	15	Willie le Roux		(substituted off) 48'
RW	14	Cheslin Kolbe
OC	13	Jesse Kriel (c)
IC	12	Damian de Allende			(substituted off) 75'
LW	11	Canan Moodie
FH	10	Handré Pollard		(substituted off) 59'	(substituted on) 75'
SH	9	Grant Williams		(substituted off) 48'
N8	8	Siya Kolisi		(substituted off) 52'
BF	7	Pieter-Steph du Toit
OF	6	Marco van Staden		(substituted off) 71'
RL	5	Ruan Nortjé		(substituted off) 51'
LL	4	Eben Etzebeth
TP	3	Thomas du Toit		(substituted off) 62'
HK	2	Malcolm Marx		(substituted off) 68'
LP	1	Ox Nché		(substituted off) 68'
Substitutions:
HK	16	Jan-Hendrik Wessels		(substituted on) 68'
PR	17	Boan Venter		(substituted on) 68'
PR	18	Wilco Louw		(substituted on) 62'
LK	19	Lood de Jager		(substituted on) 51'
FL	20	Kwagga Smith	(yellow card) 65'	(substituted on) 52'
SH	21	Cobus Reinach		(substituted on) 48'
FH	22	Sacha Feinberg-Mngomezulu		(substituted on) 48'
CE	23	Ethan Hooker		(substituted on) 59'
Coach:
Rassie Erasmus

Player of the Match:
Ardie Savea (New Zealand)

Assistant referees:
Nika Amashukeli (Georgia)
Jordan Way (Australia)
Television match official:
Brett Cronan (Australia)
Foul play review officer:
Eric Gauzins (France)

Notes:

- Kyle Preston (New Zealand) made his international debut.
- Ardie Savea (New Zealand) became the 15th New Zealand men's player to earn 100 test caps.

=== Round 4 ===
13 September 2025
14:00 AEST (UTC+10)

(2 BP) Australia	26–28	Argentina
Try: Sua'ali'i 4' c Kellaway 66' c Daugunu (2) 67' m, 78' c Con: Edmed (1/1) 6'; O'Connor (2/3) 66', 79'	Report	Try: Montoya 7' c Con: Carreras (1/1) 8'; Pen: Carreras (7/7) 3', 13', 25', 37', 43', 52', 63'

Sydney Football Stadium, Sydney
Attendance: 41,912
Referee: Christophe Ridley (England)

FB	15	Andrew Kellaway
RW	14	Max Jorgensen	(yellow card) 17'
OC	13	Joseph Sua'ali'i
IC	12	Hunter Paisami		(substituted off) 63'
LW	11	Corey Toole		(substituted off) 59'
FH	10	Tane Edmed		(substituted off) 54'
SH	9	Nic White		(substituted off) 40'
N8	8	Harry Wilson (c)
OF	7	Fraser McReight
BF	6	Rob Valetini
RL	5	Tom Hooper		(substituted off) 52'
LL	4	Jeremy Williams
TP	3	Taniela Tupou		(substituted off) 40'
HK	2	Billy Pollard		(substituted off) 52'
LP	1	James Slipper		(substituted off) 40'
Substitutions:
HK	16	Josh Nasser		(substituted on) 52'
PR	17	Angus Bell		(substituted on) 40'
PR	18	Zane Nonggorr		(substituted on) 40'
LK	19	Lukhan Salakaia-Loto		(substituted on) 52'
FL	20	Carlo Tizzano		(substituted on) 64'
SH	21	Tate McDermott		(substituted on) 40'
FH	22	James O'Connor		(substituted on) 54'
WG	23	Filipo Daugunu		(substituted on) 59'
Coach:
Joe Schmidt

FB	15	Juan Cruz Mallía
RW	14	Rodrigo Isgró		(substituted off) 59'
OC	13	Lucio Cinti
IC	12	Santiago Chocobares		(substituted off) 71'
LW	11	Mateo Carreras
FH	10	Santiago Carreras	(yellow card) 64'
SH	9	Gonzalo García		(substituted off) 50'
N8	8	Joaquín Oviedo
OF	7	Marcos Kremer
BF	6	Juan Martín González		(substituted off) 50'
RL	5	Pedro Rubiolo
LL	4	Guido Petti		(substituted off) 50'
TP	3	Joel Sclavi		(substituted off) 50'
HK	2	Julián Montoya (c)		(substituted off) 71'
LP	1	Mayco Vivas		(substituted off) 59'
Substitutions:
HK	16	Ignacio Ruiz		(substituted on) 71'
PR	17	Boris Wenger		(substituted on) 59'
PR	18	Francisco Coria Marchetti		(substituted on) 50'
LK	19	Franco Molina		(substituted on) 50'
FL	20	Pablo Matera		(substituted on) 50'
SH	21	Agustín Moyano		(substituted on) 50'
CE	22	Justo Piccardo		(substituted on) 71'
WG	23	Ignacio Mendy		(substituted on) 59'
Coach:
Felipe Contepomi

Player of the Match:
Santiago Carreras (Argentina)

Assistant referees:
Paul Williams (New Zealand)
Sam Grove-White (Scotland)
Television match official:
Glenn Newman (New Zealand)
Foul play review officer:
Mike Adamson (Scotland)

Notes:

- Argentina retained the Puma Trophy.

13 September 2025
19:05 NZST (UTC+12)

New Zealand	10–43	South Africa (1 BP)
Try: Carter 17' c Con: McKenzie (1/1) 18'; Pen: McKenzie (1/1) 28'	Report	Try: Kolbe (2) 24' c, 42' c Willemse 60' c Smith 68' m Snyman 72' c Esterhuizen 78' c Con: Libbok (5/6) 25', 43', 61', 73', 79'; Pen: Libbok (1/1) 46'

Wellington Regional Stadium, Wellington
Attendance: 34,068
Referee: Nika Amashukeli (Georgia)

FB	15	Damian McKenzie
RW	14	Will Jordan
OC	13	Billy Proctor	(substituted off) 60'
IC	12	Jordie Barrett
LW	11	Leroy Carter	(substituted off) 65'
FH	10	Beauden Barrett
SH	9	Noah Hotham	(substituted off) 9'
N8	8	Wallace Sititi	(substituted off) 65'
OF	7	Ardie Savea
BF	6	Simon Parker	(substituted off) 62'	(substituted on) 74'
RL	5	Tupou Vaa'i		(substituted off) 74'
LL	4	Scott Barrett (c)
TP	3	Tyrel Lomax	(substituted off) 43'
HK	2	Samisoni Taukei'aho	(substituted off) 54'
LP	1	Ethan de Groot	(substituted off) 43'
Substitutions:
HK	16	Brodie McAlister	(substituted on) 54'
PR	17	Tamaiti Williams	(substituted on) 43'
PR	18	Fletcher Newell	(substituted on) 43'
LK	19	Fabian Holland	(substituted on) 62'
FL	20	Du'Plessis Kirifi	(substituted on) 65'
SH	21	Finlay Christie	(substituted on) 9'
CE	22	Quinn Tupaea	(substituted on) 60'
FB	23	Ruben Love	(substituted on) 65'
Coach:
Scott Robertson

FB	15	Aphelele Fassi	(substituted off) 37'
RW	14	Cheslin Kolbe			(substituted off) 46'
OC	13	Canan Moodie
IC	12	Damian Willemse
LW	11	Ethan Hooker
FH	10	Sacha Feinberg-Mngomezulu	(substituted off) 18'
SH	9	Cobus Reinach	(substituted off) 32'	(substituted on) 40'
N8	8	Jasper Wiese
BF	7	Pieter-Steph du Toit
OF	6	Siya Kolisi (c)	(substituted off) 58'
RL	5	Ruan Nortjé
LL	4	Lood de Jager	(substituted off) 9'
TP	3	Thomas du Toit	(substituted off) 41'
HK	2	Malcolm Marx	(substituted off) 62'
LP	1	Ox Nché	(substituted off) 41'
Substitutions:
HK	16	Marnus van der Merwe	(substituted on) 62'
PR	17	Jan-Hendrik Wessels	(substituted on) 41'
PR	18	Wilco Louw	(substituted on) 41'
LK	19	RG Snyman	(substituted on) 9'
FL	20	Kwagga Smith	(substituted on) 58'
SH	21	Grant Williams	(substituted on) 32'	(substituted off) 40'	(substituted on) 46'
FH	22	Manie Libbok	(substituted on) 18'
CE	23	André Esterhuizen	(substituted on) 37'
Coach:
Rassie Erasmus

Player of the Match:
Damian Willemse (South Africa)

Assistant referees:
Angus Gardner (Australia)
Jordan Way (Australia)
Television match official:
Eric Gauzins (France)
Foul play review officer:
Brett Cronan (Australia)

Notes:

- Leroy Carter (New Zealand) made his international debut.
- This was New Zealand's heaviest defeat (33 points), surpassing South Africa's 28-point victory set during the 2023 Rugby World Cup warm-up matches.
- The 43 points scored by the Springboks were the most scored by an away team in New Zealand, surpassing the 38 points scored by Argentina in 2024.
- South Africa retained the Freedom Cup for the first time in its 21-year history and won it for only the fourth time in history.

=== Round 5 ===
27 September 2025
17:05 NZST (UTC+12)

New Zealand	33–24	Australia
Try: Clarke 3' m Carter 13' m Roigard (2) 23' c, 74' c Con: B. Barrett (1/3) 24'; McKenzie (1/1) 75'; Pen: B. Barrett (1/1) 9'; McKenzie (2/2) 47', 54'	Report	Try: Pollard 29' c Potter 37' c Tizzano 68' c Con: O'Connor (3/3) 30', 38', 69'; Pen: O'Connor (1/1) 7'

Eden Park, Auckland
Attendance: 46,437
Referee: Andrea Piardi (Italy)

FB	15	Will Jordan
RW	14	Leroy Carter
OC	13	Billy Proctor
IC	12	Jordie Barrett
LW	11	Caleb Clarke	(substituted off) 45'
FH	10	Beauden Barrett	(substituted off) 26'
SH	9	Cam Roigard	(substituted off) 76'
N8	8	Wallace Sititi	(substituted off) 61'
OF	7	Ardie Savea (c)
BF	6	Simon Parker
RL	5	Tupou Vaa'i	(substituted off) 51'
LL	4	Fabian Holland
TP	3	Tyrel Lomax	(substituted off) 51'
HK	2	Codie Taylor	(substituted off) 64'
LP	1	Ethan de Groot	(substituted off) 30'
Substitutions:
HK	16	Samisoni Taukei'aho	(substituted on) 64'
PR	17	Tamaiti Williams	(substituted on) 30'
PR	18	Fletcher Newell	(substituted on) 51'
LK	19	Patrick Tuipulotu	(substituted on) 51'
FL	20	Peter Lakai	(substituted on) 61'
SH	21	Cortez Ratima	(substituted on) 76'
CE	22	Quinn Tupaea	(substituted on) 45'
FH	23	Damian McKenzie	(substituted on) 26'
Coach:
Scott Robertson

FB	15	Max Jorgensen
RW	14	Harry Potter	(yellow card) 72'
OC	13	Joseph Sua'ali'i
IC	12	Len Ikitau		(substituted off) 61'
LW	11	Corey Toole
FH	10	James O'Connor
SH	9	Tate McDermott		(substituted off) 18'
N8	8	Harry Wilson (c)
OF	7	Fraser McReight		(substituted off) 62'	(substituted on) 71'
BF	6	Tom Hooper			(substituted off) 71'
RL	5	Lukhan Salakaia-Loto		(substituted off) 61'
LL	4	Nick Frost
TP	3	Taniela Tupou		(substituted off) 40'
HK	2	Billy Pollard		(substituted off) 62'
LP	1	James Slipper		(substituted off) 40'
Substitutions:
HK	16	Brandon Paenga-Amosa		(substituted on) 62'
PR	17	Angus Bell		(substituted on) 40'
PR	18	Allan Alaalatoa		(substituted on) 40'
LK	19	Jeremy Williams		(substituted on) 61'
FL	20	Carlo Tizzano		(substituted on) 62'
SH	21	Ryan Lonergan		(substituted on) 18'
FH	22	Tane Edmed
WG	23	Filipo Daugunu		(substituted on) 61'
Coach:
Joe Schmidt

Player of the Match:
Cam Roigard (New Zealand)

Assistant referees:
Matthew Carley (England)
Morné Ferreira (South Africa)
Television match official:
Marius Jonker (South Africa)
Foul play review officer:
Andrew Jackson (England)

Notes:

- Ryan Lonergan (Australia) made his international debut.
- James Slipper (Australia) earned his 150th test cap, and became the third male and first Australian rugby player to achieve the milestone.
- Tate McDermott (Australia) earned his 50th test cap.
- New Zealand retained the Bledisloe Cup and equalled their longest win streak against Australia (10 matches).

27 September 2025
17:10 SAST (UTC+02)

(1 BP) South Africa	67–30	Argentina
Try: Marx 30' m Feinberg-Mngomezulu (3) 37' c, 40+3' c, 50' c Kolbe 42' c van den Berg 59' c P. du Toit (2) 65' c, 79' c Libbok 74' c Con: Feinberg-Mngomezulu (8/9) 37', 40+4', 43', 51', 60', 66', 74', 80'; Pen: Feinberg-Mngomezulu (2/2) 4', 19'	Report	Try: Chocobares 35' c Penalty try 40'; Albornoz 52' c Con: S. Carreras (2/2) 36', 53'; Pen: S. Carreras (3/4) 8', 14', 25'

Kings Park Stadium, Durban
Attendance: 45,158
Referee: Angus Gardner (Australia)

FB	15	Damian Willemse		(substituted off) 61'
RW	14	Cheslin Kolbe		(substituted off) 56'
OC	13	Canan Moodie
IC	12	Damian de Allende
LW	11	Ethan Hooker
FH	10	Sacha Feinberg-Mngomezulu
SH	9	Cobus Reinach		(substituted off) 56'
N8	8	Jasper Wiese		(substituted off) 72'
BF	7	Pieter-Steph du Toit
OF	6	Siya Kolisi (c)		(substituted off) 45'	(substituted on) 47'	(substituted off) 61'
RL	5	Ruan Nortjé
LL	4	Eben Etzebeth		(substituted off) 47'
TP	3	Thomas du Toit		(substituted off) 45'
HK	2	Malcolm Marx	(yellow card) 40'
LP	1	Boan Venter				(substituted off) 53'
Substitutions:
HK	16	Marco van Staden		(substituted on) 72'
PR	17	Jan-Hendrik Wessels		(substituted on) 45'	(substituted off) 47'	(substituted on) 53'
PR	18	Wilco Louw		(substituted on) 45'
LK	19	RG Snyman		(substituted on) 47'
FL	20	Kwagga Smith				(substituted on) 61'
SH	21	Morné van den Berg		(substituted on) 56'
FH	22	Manie Libbok		(substituted on) 61'
CE	23	André Esterhuizen		(substituted on) 56'
Coach:
Rassie Erasmus

FB	15	Juan Cruz Mallía
RW	14	Rodrigo Isgró	(substituted off) 44'	(substituted on) 75'
OC	13	Lucio Cinti
IC	12	Santiago Chocobares
LW	11	Mateo Carreras
FH	10	Santiago Carreras	(substituted off) 64'
SH	9	Gonzalo García		(substituted off) 75'
N8	8	Joaquín Oviedo
OF	7	Marcos Kremer
BF	6	Pablo Matera	(substituted off) 56'
RL	5	Lucas Paulos	(substituted off) 40'
LL	4	Franco Molina	(substituted off) 46'
TP	3	Joel Sclavi	(substituted off) 46'
HK	2	Julián Montoya (c)	(substituted off) 64'
LP	1	Mayco Vivas	(substituted off) 51'
Substitutions:
HK	16	Ignacio Ruiz	(substituted on) 64'
PR	17	Boris Wenger	(substituted on) 51'
PR	18	Francisco Coria Marchetti	(substituted on) 46'
LK	19	Guido Petti	(substituted on) 46'
LK	20	Pedro Rubiolo	(substituted on) 40'
FL	21	Juan Martín González	(substituted on) 56'
SH	22	Simon Benitez Cruz	(substituted on) 64'
FH	23	Tomás Albornoz	(substituted on) 44'
Coach:
Felipe Contepomi

Player of the Match:
Sacha Feinberg-Mngomezulu (South Africa)

Assistant referees:
Pierre Brousset (France)
Angus Mabey (New Zealand)
Television match official:
Brett Cronan (Australia)
Foul play review officer:
Gianluca Gnecchi (Italy)

Notes:

- The combined scored of 97 was the highest between the two teams, and set a new The Rugby Championship record. The total surpassed the two teams' previous high of 86 (73–13) that was achieved in 2013 (which was also a Rugby Championship record), and broke the previous Rugby Championship record of 94 achieved in 2024 between Argentina and Australia.
- Sacha Feinberg-Mngomezulu's 37 points was a South African test record for points scored in a match by a player, surpassing Percy Montgomery's 35 points scored against Namibia in 2007.

=== Round 6 ===
4 October 2025
17:45 AWST (UTC+08)

Australia	14–28	New Zealand (1 BP)
Try: Ikitau 66' m Pen: Edmed (3/3) 6', 11', 17'	Report	Try: Carter 8' c Tupaea (2) 33' m, 36' c Bower 80' m Con: McKenzie (1/4) 9'; Pen: McKenzie (2/3) 62', 70'

Perth Stadium, Perth
Attendance: 61,266
Referee: Matthew Carley (England)

FB	15	Max Jorgensen
RW	14	Harry Potter		(substituted off) 71'
OC	13	Joseph Sua'ali'i
IC	12	Len Ikitau	(yellow card) 44'
LW	11	Filipo Daugunu
FH	10	Tane Edmed
SH	9	Jake Gordon		(substituted off) 57'
N8	8	Harry Wilson (c)
OF	7	Fraser McReight		(substituted off) 72'
BF	6	Tom Hooper	(yellow card) 11'
RL	5	Will Skelton		(substituted off) 15'
LL	4	Nick Frost		(substituted off) 52'	(substituted on) 79'
TP	3	Allan Alaalatoa		(substituted off) 40'
HK	2	Billy Pollard		(substituted off) 62'
LP	1	James Slipper		(substituted off) 45'
Substitutions:
HK	16	Josh Nasser		(substituted on) 62'
PR	17	Tom Robertson		(substituted on) 45'
PR	18	Taniela Tupou		(substituted on) 40'
LK	19	Jeremy Williams		(substituted on) 15'
FL	20	Rob Valetini		(substituted on) 52'
SH	21	Ryan Lonergan		(substituted on) 57'
FH	22	James O'Connor		(substituted on) 71'
CE	23	Josh Flook		(substituted on) 72'	(substituted off) 79'
Coach:
Joe Schmidt

FB	15	Will Jordan
RW	14	Leroy Carter
OC	13	Quinn Tupaea	(substituted off) 56'
IC	12	Jordie Barrett
LW	11	Leicester Faingaʻanuku	(substituted off) 73'
FH	10	Damian McKenzie
SH	9	Cam Roigard	(substituted off) 73'
N8	8	Peter Lakai	(substituted off) 62'
OF	7	Ardie Savea
BF	6	Simon Parker
RL	5	Fabian Holland	(substituted off) 51'
LL	4	Scott Barrett (c)
TP	3	Fletcher Newell	(substituted off) 66'
HK	2	Codie Taylor	(substituted off) 61'
LP	1	Tamaiti Williams	(substituted off) 66'
Substitutions:
HK	16	Samisoni Taukei'aho	(substituted on) 61'
PR	17	George Bower	(substituted on) 66'
PR	18	Pasilio Tosi	(substituted on) 66'
LK	19	Patrick Tuipulotu	(substituted on) 51'
N8	20	Wallace Sititi	(substituted on) 62'
SH	21	Cortez Ratima	(substituted on) 73'
WG	22	Rieko Ioane	(substituted on) 56'
FB	23	Ruben Love	(substituted on) 73'
Coach:
Scott Robertson

Player of the Match:
Quinn Tupaea (New Zealand)

Assistant referees:
Karl Dickson (England)
Morné Ferreira (South Africa)
Television match official:
Andrew Jackson (England)
Foul play review officer:
Marius Jonker (South Africa)

Notes:

- New Zealand set a new record of 11 consecutive wins over Australia, surpassing 10 consecutive wins set between 2008 and 2010.
- Will Jordan (New Zealand) earned his 50th test cap.

4 October 2025
14:00 BST (UTC+1)

(1 BP) Argentina	27–29	South Africa
Try: Delguy (2) 4' c, 66' c Isgró 80+2' c Con: Carreras (3/3) 5', 66', 80+3'; Pen: Carreras (2/3) 18', 27'	Report	Try: Reinach (2) 38' c, 52' c Marx (2) 44' m, 58' c Con: Feinberg-Mngomezulu (3/4) 39', 53', 59'; Pen: Feinberg-Mngomezulu (1/1) 10'

Twickenham Stadium, London, England
Attendance: 70,360
Referee: Andrea Piardi (Italy)

FB	15	Santiago Carreras
RW	14	Bautista Delguy
OC	13	Justo Piccardo		(substituted off) 47'
IC	12	Santiago Chocobares
LW	11	Juan Cruz Mallía
FH	10	Gerónimo Prisciantelli		(substituted off) 66'
SH	9	Simon Benitez Cruz		(substituted off) 71'
N8	8	Santiago Grondona		(substituted off) 48'
OF	7	Marcos Kremer			(substituted off) 71'
BF	6	Pablo Matera		(substituted off) 48'	(substituted on) 71'
RL	5	Pedro Rubiolo
LL	4	Guido Petti		(substituted off) 55'
TP	3	Francisco Coria Marchetti		(substituted off) 55'
HK	2	Julián Montoya (c)		(substituted off) 73'
LP	1	Mayco Vivas	(yellow card) 43'			(substituted off) 66'
Substitutions:
HK	16	Ignacio Ruiz		(substituted on) 73'
PR	17	Boris Wenger		(substituted on) 47'	(substituted off) 53'	(substituted on) 66'
PR	18	Tomás Rapetti		(substituted on) 55'
LK	19	Franco Molina		(substituted on) 55'
FL	20	Juan Martín González		(substituted on) 48'
N8	21	Joaquín Oviedo		(substituted on) 48'
SH	22	Agustín Moyano		(substituted on) 71'
WG	23	Rodrigo Isgró		(substituted on) 66'
Coach:
Felipe Contepomi

FB	15	Damian Willemse
RW	14	Cheslin Kolbe
OC	13	Canan Moodie	(yellow card) 1'	(substituted off) 50'
IC	12	Damian de Allende
LW	11	Ethan Hooker
FH	10	Sacha Feinberg-Mngomezulu		(substituted off) 68'
SH	9	Cobus Reinach		(substituted off) 68'
N8	8	Jasper Wiese
BF	7	Pieter-Steph du Toit
OF	6	Siya Kolisi (c)		(substituted off) 61'
RL	5	Ruan Nortjé
LL	4	Eben Etzebeth		(substituted off) 48'
TP	3	Thomas du Toit		(substituted off) 50'
HK	2	Malcolm Marx		(substituted off) 61'
LP	1	Ox Nché		(substituted off) 50'
Substitutions:
HK	16	Bongi Mbonambi		(substituted on) 61'
PR	17	Jan-Hendrik Wessels		(substituted on) 50'
PR	18	Wilco Louw		(substituted on) 50'
LK	19	RG Snyman		(substituted on) 48'
FL	20	Kwagga Smith		(substituted on) 61'
SH	21	Grant Williams		(substituted on) 68'
FH	22	Manie Libbok		(substituted on) 68'
CE	23	Jesse Kriel		(substituted on) 50'
Coach:
Rassie Erasmus

Player of the Match:
Cobus Reinach (South Africa)

Assistant referees:
Nika Amashukeli (Georgia)
Eoghan Cross (Ireland)
Television match official:
Ian Tempest (England)
Foul play review officer:
Matteo Liperini (Italy)

Notes:

- With this win for South Africa, they retained the Rugby Championship title, the first time they have achieved this in either formats of The Rugby Championship or Tri Nations.
- Tomas Rapetti (Argentina) made his international debut.

== Statistics ==
=== Points scorers ===
Pos.	Name	Team	Pts.
1	Santiago Carreras	Argentina	72
2	Sacha Feinberg-Mngomezulu	South Africa	50
3	Damian McKenzie	New Zealand	33
4	James O'Connor	Australia	32
5	Manie Libbok	South Africa	25
6	Tomás Albornoz	Argentina	22
7	Malcolm Marx	South Africa	20
7	Joseph Sua'ali'i	Australia	20
9	Beauden Barrett	New Zealand	19
10	Handré Pollard	South Africa	18

=== Try scorers ===
Pos.	Name	Team	Tries
1	Malcolm Marx	South Africa	4
1	Joseph Sua'ali'i	Australia	4
3	Leroy Carter	New Zealand	3
3	Bautista Delguy	Argentina	3
3	Sacha Feinberg-Mngomezulu	South Africa	3
3	Cheslin Kolbe	South Africa	3
3	Cobus Reinach	South Africa	3
3	Samisoni Taukei'aho	New Zealand	3
3	Quinn Tupaea	New Zealand	3
10	Tomás Albornoz	Argentina	2
10	Filipo Daugunu	Australia	2
10	Pieter-Steph du Toit	South Africa	2
10	André Esterhuizen	South Africa	2
10	Rodrigo Isgró	Argentina	2
10	Max Jorgensen	Australia	2
10	Sevu Reece	New Zealand	2
10	Cam Roigard	New Zealand	2
10	Kwagga Smith	South Africa	2
10	Harry Wilson	Australia	2

== Participants ==
Team	Stadium			Coach	Captain	World Rugby Ranking	
Team	Home stadium	Capacity	Location	Coach	Captain	Start (Note: As of 11 August 2025.)	End (Note: As of 6 October 2025.)
Argentina (Note: In Round 6 of the tournament, Argentina's home fixture against South Africa was hosted at Twickenham Stadium, London, a neutral venue for both teams.)	Estadio Mario Alberto Kempes	57,000	Córdoba (vs. New Zealand)	Felipe Contepomi	Julián Montoya	7th	6th
Argentina	José Amalfitani Stadium	49,540	Buenos Aires (vs. New Zealand)	Felipe Contepomi	Julián Montoya	7th	6th
Argentina	Twickenham Stadium (Note: The Argentine Rugby Union (UAR) took their home game against South Africa to Twickenham Stadium in London, a neutral venue.)	82,000	London (vs. South Africa)	Felipe Contepomi	Julián Montoya	7th	6th
Australia	North Queensland Stadium	25,000	Townsville (vs. Argentina)	Joe Schmidt	Harry Wilson	6th	7th
Australia	Perth Stadium	61,266	Perth (vs. New Zealand)	Joe Schmidt	Harry Wilson	6th	7th
Australia	Sydney Football Stadium	42,500	Sydney (vs. Argentina)	Joe Schmidt	Harry Wilson	6th	7th
New Zealand	Eden Park	50,000	Auckland	Scott Robertson	Scott Barrett	2nd	2nd
New Zealand	Wellington Regional Stadium	34,500	Wellington (vs. South Africa)	Scott Robertson	Scott Barrett	2nd	2nd
South Africa	DHL Stadium	58,310	Cape Town (vs. Australia)	Rassie Erasmus	Siya Kolisi	1st	1st
South Africa	Ellis Park Stadium	62,357	Johannesburg (vs. Australia)	Rassie Erasmus	Siya Kolisi	1st	1st
South Africa	Kings Park Stadium	54,000	Durban (vs. Argentina)	Rassie Erasmus	Siya Kolisi	1st	1st

=== Squads ===
Note: Ages, caps and clubs/franchises are of 16 August 2025, the starting date of the tournament.

==== Argentina ====
On 4 August, Argentina named a 34-player squad for the opening rounds of the Rugby Championship.

On 18 August, Emiliano Boffelli, Benjamín Grondona and Leonel Oviedo were called up to the squad ahead of the second round.

On 25 August, Argentina named a 32-player touring squad for their round 3 and 4 matches against Australia, which saw the call-ups of Ignacio Calles, Tomas Rapetti and Nicolas Roger.

Player	Position	Date of birth (age)	Caps	Club/province
Bautista Bernasconi	Hooker	14 September 2001 (aged 23)	3	(Italy) Benetton
Julián Montoya (c)	Hooker	29 October 1993 (aged 31)	108	(France) Pau
Leonel Oviedo	Hooker	16 February 1998 (aged 27)	0	(Argentina) Dogos
Ignacio Ruiz	Hooker	3 January 2001 (aged 24)	17	(France) Perpignan
Ignacio Calles	Prop	24 October 1995 (aged 29)	9	(France) Bayonne
Nahuel Tetaz Chaparro	Prop	11 June 1989 (aged 36)	78	(Italy) Benetton
Francisco Coria Marchetti	Prop	7 October 2000 (aged 24)	3	(France) Brive
Pedro Delgado	Prop	1 September 1997 (aged 27)	4	(Argentina) Dogos
Tomas Rapetti	Prop	4 March 2005 (aged 20)	0	(France) Toulouse
Joel Sclavi	Prop	25 June 1994 (aged 31)	27	(France) La Rochelle
Mayco Vivas	Prop	2 June 1998 (aged 27)	30	(France) Oyonnax
Boris Wenger	Prop	1 July 2002 (aged 23)	0	(Argentina) Dogos
Franco Molina	Lock	28 August 1997 (aged 27)	12	(England) Exeter Chiefs
Pedro Rubiolo	Lock	21 December 2002 (aged 22)	23	(England) Bristol Bears
Lucas Paulos	Lock	9 January 1998 (aged 27)	17	(France) Bayonne
Guido Petti	Lock	17 November 1994 (aged 30)	89	(England) Harlequins
Nicolás D'Amorim	Back row	22 October 2000 (aged 24)	1	(Argentina) Pampas
Juan Martín González	Back row	14 November 2000 (aged 24)	42	(England) Saracens
Benjamín Grondona	Back row	19 October 2003 (aged 21)	2	(England) Bristol Bears
Santiago Grondona	Back row	25 July 1998 (aged 27)	21	(England) Bristol Bears
Marcos Kremer	Back row	30 July 1997 (aged 28)	73	(France) Clermont Auvergne
Pablo Matera	Back row	18 July 1993 (aged 32)	112	(Japan) Mie Honda Heat
Joaquín Oviedo	Back row	17 July 2001 (aged 24)	12	(France) Perpignan
Simon Benitez Cruz	Scrum-half	6 September 1999 (aged 25)	3	(Argentina) Tarucas
Gonzalo García	Scrum-half	5 March 1999 (aged 26)	11	(Italy) Zebre Parma
Agustín Moyano	Scrum-half	12 June 2001 (aged 24)	2	(Argentina) Dogos
Tomás Albornoz	Fly-half	17 September 1997 (aged 27)	17	(Italy) Benetton
Gerónimo Prisciantelli	Fly-half	23 August 1999 (aged 25)	0	(France) Racing 92
Nicolas Roger	Fly-half	1 November 2000 (aged 24)	3	(Argentina) Tarucas
Santiago Chocobares	Centre	31 March 1999 (aged 26)	27	(France) Toulouse
Lucio Cinti	Centre	23 February 2000 (aged 25)	33	(England) Saracens
Justo Piccardo	Centre	25 March 2002 (aged 23)	3	(France) Montpellier
Mateo Carreras	Wing	17 December 1999 (aged 25)	27	(France) Bayonne
Bautista Delguy	Wing	22 April 1997 (aged 28)	33	(France) Clermont Auvergne
Rodrigo Isgró	Wing	23 March 1999 (aged 26)	9	(England) Harlequins
Ignacio Mendy	Wing	29 June 2000 (aged 25)	3	(Italy) Benetton
Emiliano Boffelli	Fullback	16 January 1995 (aged 30)	59	(Argentina) Duendes
Santiago Carreras	Fullback	30 March 1998 (aged 27)	55	(England) Bath
Benjamín Elizalde	Fullback	14 June 2004 (aged 21)	3	(England) Bristol Bears
Juan Cruz Mallía	Fullback	11 September 1996 (aged 28)	42	(France) Toulouse

==== Australia ====
On 7 August, Australia named a 35-player squad for the opening rounds of the Rugby Championship.

On 28 August, Australia named a 36-player squad for their round 3 and 4 matches against Argentina, which saw the call-ups of Allan Alaalatoa, Josh Canham, Filipo Daugunu, Tom Lynagh, Harry Potter, Pete Samu and Hamish Stewart.

Player	Position	Date of birth (age)	Caps	Club/province
Josh Nasser	Hooker	23 June 1999 (aged 26)	6	(Australia) Reds
Brandon Paenga-Amosa	Hooker	25 December 1995 (aged 29)	21	(Australia) Force
Billy Pollard	Hooker	9 December 2001 (aged 23)	10	(Australia) Brumbies
Allan Alaalatoa	Prop	28 January 1994 (aged 31)	83	(Australia) Waratahs
Angus Bell	Prop	4 October 2000 (aged 24)	39	(Australia) Waratahs
Zane Nonggorr	Prop	30 March 2001 (aged 24)	12	(Australia) Reds
Tom Robertson	Prop	28 August 1994 (aged 30)	33	(Australia) Force
Aidan Ross	Prop	25 December 1995 (aged 29)	0	(Australia) Reds
James Slipper	Prop	6 June 1989 (aged 36)	147	(Australia) Brumbies
Taniela Tupou	Prop	10 May 1996 (aged 29)	59	(Australia) Waratahs
Josh Canham	Lock	1 February 2001 (aged 24)	1	(Australia) Reds
Nick Frost	Lock	10 October 1999 (aged 25)	29	(Australia) Brumbies
Lukhan Salakaia-Loto	Lock	19 December 1996 (aged 28)	41	(Australia) Reds
Will Skelton	Lock	3 May 1992 (aged 33)	33	(France) La Rochelle
Jeremy Williams	Lock	2 December 2000 (aged 24)	14	(Australia) Force
Nick Champion de Crespigny	Back row	27 June 1996 (aged 29)	1	(Australia) Force
Langi Gleeson	Back row	21 July 2001 (aged 24)	17	(Australia) Waratahs
Tom Hooper	Back row	29 January 2001 (aged 24)	13	(Australia) Brumbies
Fraser McReight	Back row	19 February 1999 (aged 26)	29	(Australia) Reds
Pete Samu	Back row	17 December 1991 (aged 33)	33	(Australia) Waratahs
Carlo Tizzano	Back row	2 February 2000 (aged 25)	8	(Australia) Force
Rob Valetini	Back row	3 September 1998 (aged 26)	53	(Australia) Brumbies
Harry Wilson (c)	Back row	22 November 1999 (aged 25)	26	(Australia) Reds
Ryan Lonergan	Scrum-half	6 April 1998 (aged 27)	0	(Australia) Brumbies
Tate McDermott	Scrum-half	18 September 1998 (aged 26)	45	(Australia) Reds
Nic White	Scrum-half	13 June 1990 (aged 35)	73	(Australia) Force
Ben Donaldson	Fly-half	5 April 1999 (aged 26)	19	(Australia) Force
Tane Edmed	Fly-half	16 August 2000 (aged 25)	1	(Australia) Waratahs
Tom Lynagh	Fly-half	14 April 2003 (aged 22)	6	(Australia) Reds
James O'Connor	Fly-half	5 July 1990 (aged 35)	64	(New Zealand) Crusaders
Josh Flook	Centre	22 September 2001 (aged 23)	4	(Australia) Reds
Len Ikitau	Centre	1 October 1998 (aged 26)	43	(Australia) Brumbies
Hunter Paisami	Centre	10 April 1999 (aged 26)	31	(Australia) Reds
Hamish Stewart	Centre	3 March 1998 (age 28)	2	(Australia) Force
Joseph Sua'ali'i	Centre	1 August 2003 (aged 22)	8	(Australia) Waratahs
Filipo Daugunu	Wing	4 March 1995 (age 31)	12	(Australia) Reds
Max Jorgensen	Wing	2 September 2004 (aged 20)	11	(Australia) Waratahs
Andrew Kellaway	Wing	12 October 1995 (aged 29)	41	(Australia) Waratahs
Dylan Pietsch	Wing	23 April 1998 (aged 27)	6	(Australia) Waratahs
Harry Potter	Wing	15 December 1997 (aged 27)	5	(Australia) Force
Corey Toole	Wing	7 March 2000 (aged 25)	0	(Australia) Brumbies
Tom Wright	Fullback	21 July 1997 (aged 28)	41	(Australia) Brumbies

==== New Zealand ====
On 4 August, New Zealand named a 36-player squad for the Rugby Championship.

George Bower, Tevita Mafileo, Josh Lord, Finlay Christie, Kyle Preston, and Leroy Carter were named as injury cover for the start of the Championship.

Player	Position	Date of birth (age)	Caps	Franchise/province
Brodie McAlister	Hooker	17 June 1997 (aged 28)	1	Chiefs / Canterbury
Codie Taylor	Hooker	31 March 1991 (aged 34)	98	Crusaders / Canterbury
Samisoni Taukei'aho	Hooker	8 August 1997 (aged 28)	33	Chiefs / Waikato
Ethan de Groot	Prop	22 July 1998 (aged 27)	32	Highlanders / Southland
Tyrel Lomax	Prop	16 March 1996 (aged 29)	45	Hurricanes / Tasman
Fletcher Newell	Prop	1 February 2000 (aged 25)	25	Crusaders / Canterbury
Ollie Norris	Prop	11 December 1999 (aged 25)	2	Chiefs / Waikato
Pasilio Tosi	Prop	18 July 1998 (aged 27)	9	Hurricanes / Bay of Plenty
Tamaiti Williams	Prop	10 August 2000 (aged 25)	18	Crusaders / Canterbury
Scott Barrett (c)	Lock	20 November 1993 (aged 31)	81	Crusaders / Taranaki
Fabian Holland	Lock	9 October 2002 (aged 22)	3	Highlanders / Otago
Patrick Tuipulotu	Lock	23 January 1993 (aged 32)	53	Blues / Auckland
Tupou Vaa'i	Lock	27 January 2000 (aged 25)	40	Chiefs / Taranaki
Samipeni Finau	Loose forward	10 May 1999 (aged 26)	11	Chiefs / Waikato
Luke Jacobson	Loose forward	20 April 1997 (aged 28)	24	Chiefs / Waikato
Du'Plessis Kirifi	Loose forward	3 March 1997 (aged 28)	3	Hurricanes / Wellington
Peter Lakai	Loose forward	4 March 2003 (aged 22)	3	Hurricanes / Wellington
Simon Parker	Loose forward	6 May 2000 (aged 25)	0	Chiefs / Northland
Ardie Savea	Loose forward	14 October 1993 (aged 31)	97	Moana Pasifika / Wellington
Wallace Sititi	Loose forward	7 September 2002 (aged 22)	10	Chiefs / North Harbour
Noah Hotham	Half-back	23 May 2003 (aged 22)	2	Crusaders / Tasman
Cortez Ratima	Half-back	22 March 2001 (aged 24)	14	Chiefs / Waikato
Cam Roigard	Half-back	16 November 2000 (aged 24)	12	Hurricanes / Counties Manukau
Beauden Barrett	First five-eighth	27 May 1991 (aged 34)	136	Blues / Taranaki
Damian McKenzie	First five-eighth	20 April 1995 (aged 30)	64	Chiefs / Waikato
Jordie Barrett	Centre	17 February 1997 (aged 28)	71	Hurricanes / Taranaki
Anton Lienert-Brown	Centre	15 April 1995 (aged 30)	85	Chiefs / Waikato
Billy Proctor	Centre	14 May 1999 (aged 26)	4	Hurricanes / Wellington
Timoci Tavatavanawai	Centre	14 February 1997 (aged 28)	2	Highlanders / Tasman
Quinn Tupaea	Centre	10 May 1999 (aged 26)	16	Chiefs / Waikato
Caleb Clarke	Wing	29 March 1999 (aged 26)	29	Blues / Auckland
Rieko Ioane	Wing	18 March 1997 (aged 28)	83	Blues / Auckland
Emoni Narawa	Wing	13 July 1999 (aged 26)	3	Chiefs / Bay of Plenty
Sevu Reece	Wing	13 February 1997 (aged 28)	34	Crusaders / Southland
Will Jordan	Fullback	24 February 1998 (aged 27)	44	Crusaders / Tasman
Ruben Love	Fullback	28 April 2001 (aged 24)	2	Hurricanes / Wellington

==== South Africa ====
On 23 July, South Africa named a 37-player squad for the opening rounds of the Rugby Championship.

On 19 August, Thomas du Toit was re-called to the squad ahead of the second round.

On 25 August, South Africa named a 36-player touring squad for their round 3 and 4 matches against New Zealand, which included the re-call of Jasper Wiese and Makazole Mapimpi.

Player	Position	Date of birth (age)	Caps	Club/province
Malcolm Marx	Hooker	13 July 1994 (aged 31)	78	(Japan) Kubota Spears
Bongi Mbonambi	Hooker	7 January 1991 (aged 34)	79	(South Africa) Sharks
Marnus van der Merwe	Hooker	17 February 1997 (aged 28)	1	(Wales) Scarlets
Thomas du Toit	Prop	5 May 1995 (aged 30)	25	(South Africa) Sharks
Vincent Koch	Prop	13 March 1990 (aged 35)	63	(South Africa) Sharks
Wilco Louw	Prop	20 July 1994 (aged 31)	18	(South Africa) Stormers
Ox Nché	Prop	23 July 1995 (aged 30)	41	(South Africa) Sharks
Asenathi Ntlabakanye	Prop	15 April 1999 (aged 26)	1	(South Africa) Lions
Boan Venter	Prop	14 April 1997 (aged 28)	1	(Scotland) Edinburgh
Jan-Hendrik Wessels	Prop	8 May 2001 (aged 24)	5	(South Africa) Bulls
Lood de Jager	Lock	17 December 1992 (aged 32)	67	(Japan) Saitama Wild Knights
Eben Etzebeth	Lock	29 October 1991 (aged 33)	133	(South Africa) Sharks
Franco Mostert	Lock	27 November 1990 (aged 34)	79	(Japan) Honda Heat
Ruan Nortjé	Lock	25 July 1998 (aged 27)	8	(South Africa) Bulls
RG Snyman	Lock	29 January 1995 (aged 30)	42	(Ireland) Leinster
Dan du Preez	Loose forward	5 August 1995 (aged 30)	6	(England) Sale Sharks
Jean-Luc du Preez	Loose forward	5 August 1995 (aged 30)	14	(France) Bordeaux
Pieter-Steph du Toit	Loose forward	20 August 1992 (aged 32)	88	(Japan) Toyota Verblitz
Siya Kolisi (c)	Loose forward	16 June 1991 (aged 34)	93	(South Africa) Sharks
Kwagga Smith	Loose forward	11 June 1993 (aged 32)	53	(Japan) Shizuoka Blue Revs
Marco van Staden	Loose forward	25 August 1995 (aged 29)	27	(South Africa) Bulls
Cobus Wiese	Loose forward	2 June 1997 (aged 28)	2	(South Africa) Bulls
Jasper Wiese	Loose forward	21 October 1995 (aged 29)	36	(Japan) Urayasu D-Rocks
Cobus Reinach	Scrum-half	7 February 1990 (aged 35)	40	(South Africa) Stormers
Morné van den Berg	Scrum-half	24 October 1997 (aged 27)	3	(South Africa) Lions
Grant Williams	Scrum-half	2 July 1996 (aged 29)	19	(South Africa) Sharks
Sacha Feinberg-Mngomezulu	Fly-half	22 February 2002 (aged 23)	10	(South Africa) Stormers
Manie Libbok	Fly-half	15 July 1997 (aged 28)	20	(Japan) Hanazono Kintetsu Liners
Handré Pollard	Fly-half	11 March 1994 (aged 31)	82	(South Africa) Bulls
Damian de Allende	Centre	25 November 1991 (aged 33)	89	(Japan) Saitama Wild Knights
André Esterhuizen	Centre	30 March 1994 (aged 31)	20	(South Africa) Sharks
Ethan Hooker	Centre	20 January 2003 (aged 22)	1	(South Africa) Sharks
Jesse Kriel	Centre	15 February 1994 (aged 31)	80	(Japan) Yokohama Canon Eagles
Kurt-Lee Arendse	Wing	17 June 1996 (aged 29)	26	(South Africa) Bulls
Cheslin Kolbe	Wing	28 November 1993 (aged 31)	41	(Japan) Tokyo Sungoliath
Makazole Mapimpi	Wing	26 July 1990 (age 36)	47	(South Africa) Sharks
Canan Moodie	Wing	5 November 2002 (aged 22)	14	(South Africa) Bulls
Edwill van der Merwe	Wing	12 April 1996 (aged 29)	3	(South Africa) Lions
Aphelele Fassi	Fullback	23 January 1998 (aged 27)	12	(South Africa) Sharks
Willie le Roux	Fullback	18 August 1989 (aged 35)	100	(South Africa) Bulls
Damian Willemse	Fullback	7 May 1998 (aged 27)	41	(South Africa) Stormers

== See also ==
- 2025 mid-year rugby union tests
- 2025 U20 Rugby Championship
- 2025 Six Nations Championship
- 2025 British & Irish Lions tour to Australia
- 2025 World Rugby Pacific Nations Cup
- 2025 end-of-year rugby union internationals
- Argentina–Australia matches
- Argentina–New Zealand matches
- Argentina–South Africa matches
- Australia–New Zealand matches
- Australia–South Africa matches
- New Zealand–South Africa matches
