= Boris Wenger =

Argentina international rugby union player (born 2002)

- Born: 1 July 2002 (age 24) Villa Maria, Argentina
- Height: 177 cm (5 ft 10 in)
- Weight: 109 kg (240 lb; 17 st 2 lb)

Rugby union career
- Position(s): Prop, Hooker
- Current team: Harlequins
Senior career
Years	Team	Apps	(Points)
2022	Cafeteros Pro		
2023–2025	Dogos		
2025–	Harlequins	10	(5)
- Correct as of 17 May 2026
International career
Years	Team	Apps	(Points)
2021–2022	Argentina U20	3	(10)
2025–	Argentina	5	(0)
- Correct as of 17 October 2025

Boris Wenger (born 1 July 2002) is an Argentina professional rugby union footballer who plays as a front row forward for Prem Rugby side Harlequins.

== Club career ==
He is from Villa Maria, Cordoba. In 2022, he played for Cafeteros Pro in the 2022 Súper Liga Americana de Rugby season. In 2023, he played in Super Rugby Americas for Córdoba-based Dogos as they finished runner-up. He was named in the all-star team of the tournament. He was also named in the team of the tournament in June 2024. He continued with the club playing loose-head prop in 2025 and was named on the team of the season again in June 2025. .

=== Harlequins ===
In August 2025, he signed for Prem Rugby side Harlequins in England ahead of the 2025–26 season. He made his debut on 12 October 2025 as a replacement against Saracens in a 20–14 victory, even scoring a try before it was ruled out for a double movement.

== International career ==
He is a former Argentina U20 international. He was called up to the senior Argentina national rugby union team for their fixture against the British and Irish Lions in June 2025. He was named as a replacement for their match against the Lions in Dublin on 20 June 2025. In his debut, the Argentina national rugby union team won the game 28–24. He went on to win a further four international caps in the 2025 Rugby Championship.
