= André Esterhuizen =

South African rugby union player

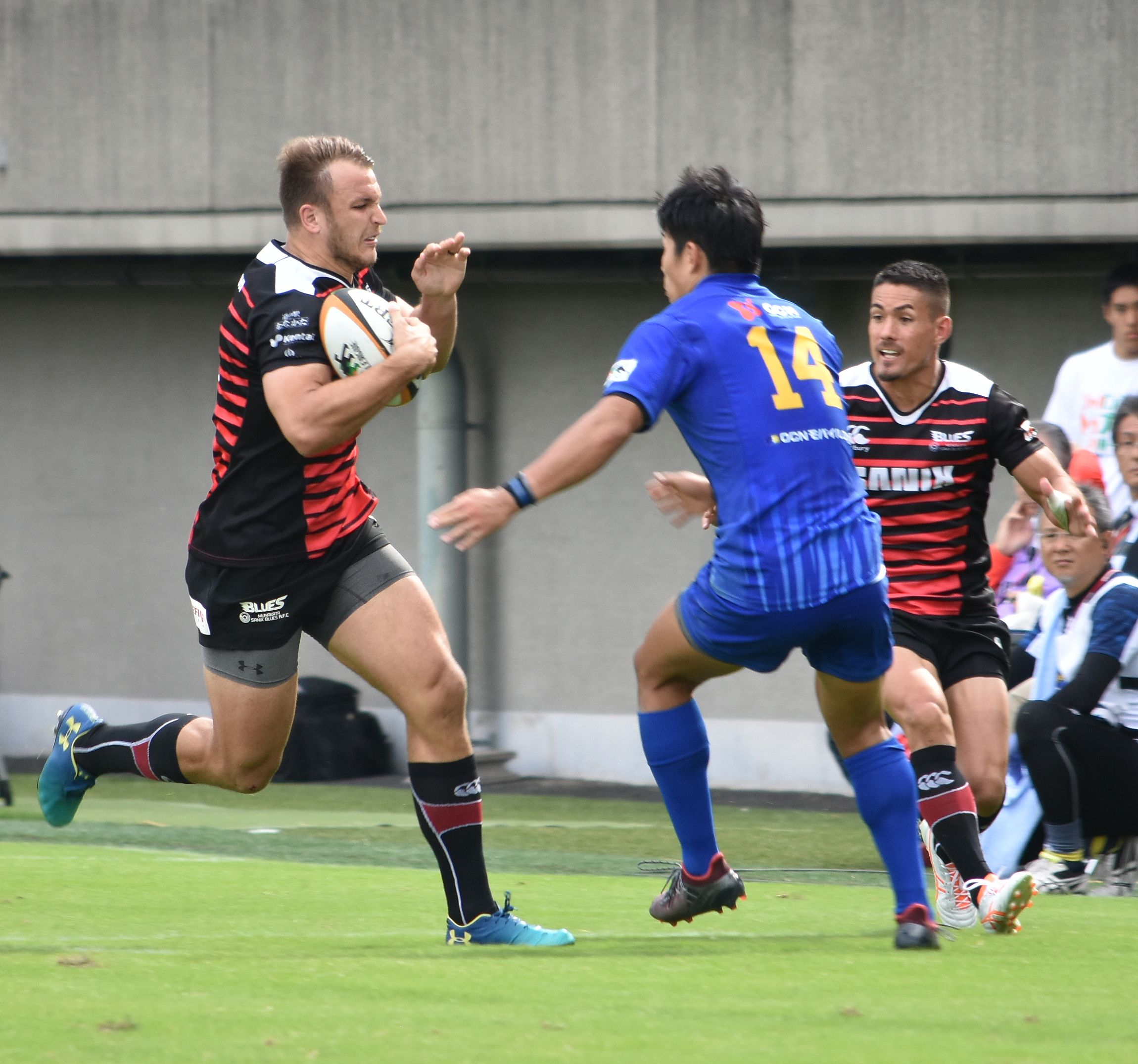
- Esterhuizen (left) playing in 2018
- Full name: Adriaan Pieter Esterhuizen
- Born: 30 March 1994 (age 32) Potchefstroom, South Africa
- Height: 1.93 m (6 ft 4 in)
- Weight: 116 kg (18 st 4 lb; 256 lb)
- School: Hoërskool Klerksdorp, Klerksdorp

Rugby union career
- Position(s): Centre, Flanker
- Current team: Sharks
Youth career
- 2007–2011: Leopards
- 2013–2015: Sharks
Senior career
Years	Team	Apps	(Points)
2013–2014	Sharks XV	12	(25)
2014–2020	Sharks (Currie Cup)	26	(55)
2014–2020	Sharks	81	(45)
2017–2020	Munakata Sanix Blues	22	(67)
2020–2024	Harlequins	90	(143)
2024–	Sharks	18	(25)
- Correct as of 25 July 2026
International career
Years	Team	Apps	(Points)
2014	South Africa Under-20	4	(10)
2018–	South Africa	35	(30)
- Correct as of 13 September 2026
Medal record
Men's Rugby union
Representing South Africa
Rugby World Cup
Gold medal – first place	2023 France	Squad

Adriaan Pieter 'André' Esterhuizen (born 30 March 1994 in Klerksdorp) is a South African professional rugby union player for the Sharks in the United Rugby Championship and South Africa national team. His regular position is centre.

== Rugby union career ==
=== Youth ===
Esterhuizen represented his local side Leopards at the Under-13 Craven Week competition in 2007, at the Under-16 Grant Khomo Week in 2010 and at the Under-18 Craven Week in 2011.

In 2013, he moved to Durban to join the Sharks. He started twelve of the Sharks U21 side's matches during the 2013 Under-21 Provincial Championship competition, finishing as the joint top try scorer in Division A of that competition with 9 tries.

=== Club career ===
==== Sharks ====
His first taste of first class rugby came for the Sharks XV during the 2013 Vodacom Cup competition. He made his debut in a 72–6 victory against the Border Bulldogs, coming on as a substitute in the second half. Further substitute appearances followed that season in matches against the Boland Cavaliers and Eastern Province Kings.

Esterhuizen was included in the Sharks wider training squad prior to the 2014 Super Rugby season, scoring a try for them in their warm-up match against Saracens and was subsequently selected in the final Super Rugby squad for 2014.

==== Harlequins ====
Esterhuizen joined Premiership Rugby side Harlequins ahead of the 2020–21 season. In February 2021, his scored his first try for the club in a 37–24 victory against Leicester Tigers. In June 2021, he won the Premiership title, starting in a 40–38 victory against Exeter Chiefs in the final, the highest scoring English league final in history.

In May 2022, he won the Rugby Players' Association's player's player of the year. The result was determined after a poll by fellow players throughout the league. Throughout the season he had scored 8 tries and helped his side qualify for the league playoffs.

On 2 January 2022, he won man of the match despite not scoring a try during a 20-17 away victory over Gloucester. On 5 January 2022, he won man of the match again against Newcastle Falcons during a 24–3 away victory. On 8 January 2022, he scored a last minute try and secured the game winning turnover to beat Exeter Chiefs. He was awarded his third consecutive man of the match in as many games for his performance. At the end of the 2021–22 season, Esterhuizen was voted Harlequins' players player of the year and fans player of the season.

In April 2024, he scored a try from a cross-field kick from Marcus Smith as the club won their first ever Champions Cup knockout game beating Glasgow Warriors 28–24 at home.

==== Return to the Sharks ====
In March 2024 Esterhuizen announced he would be returning to South Africa for family reasons. On his time at Harlequins, he was quoted as saying I'm very grateful to Harlequins for providing me with the opportunity to return home to South Africa and be closer to my family...I have loved my time at Quins. The club has played a huge role in my development and career achievements.

His return to the Sharks was confirmed on 14 March 2024, departing the Harlequins one year prior to the end of his contract.

=== International career ===
He was included in the South Africa Under-20 side for the 2014 IRB Junior World Championship.

In 2018, Esterhuizen made his debut for South Africa against Wales in a one off match staged in Washington. South Africa went on to lose the game 22–20.

In September 2023, Esterhuizen was named as part of South Africa's squad for the 2023 Rugby World Cup. South Africa went on to win the tournament beating New Zealand 12–11 in the final.

In August 2025, he scored his first try during a 38–22 defeat against Australia in the 2025 Rugby Championship opening fixture. The following week, he made his competitive debut at flanker also against Australia, replacing Franco Mostert during a 30–22 victory. In September 2025, he scored another try during the tournament in the largest victory ever on New Zealand home soil, a 43–10 win. Although he did not play in the final fixture, South Africa did go on to win the tournament. In October 2025, he was picked for the no.20 jersey to, again, play in a hybrid role between forwards and backs ahead of the 2025 Autumn Nations Series fixture against Japan. Coming off the bench to play flanker, he went to score a try as they won 61–7. The following week head coach, Rassie Erasmus, took this a step further. After a red card to lock, Lood de Jager, their fixture against France, Esterhuizen scored another try playing a role in both the forwards and the backs throughout the game during a 32–17 victory.

=== Test Match record ===
As of 27 September 2026

Against	P	W	D	L	Tri	Pts	%Won
Argentina	7	6	0	1	0	0	85.71
Australia	6	4	0	2	1	5	66.67
England	3	1	0	2	0	0	33.33
France	1	1	0	0	1	5	100
Ireland	1	1	0	0	0	0	100
Italy	3	3	0	0	0	0	100
Japan	1	1	0	0	1	5	100
New Zealand	6	5	0	1	2	10	83.33
Portugal	1	1	0	0	0	0	100
Romania	1	1	0	0	0	0	100
Scotland	1	1	0	0	0	0	100
Tonga	1	1	0	0	0	0	100
Wales	4	2	0	2	1	5	50
Total	35	28	0	7	6	30	80

P = Games Played, W = Games Won, D = Games Drawn, L = Games Lost, Tri = Tries Scored, Pts = Points Scored

=== International tries ===
As of 28 August 2026

Try	Opposing team	Location	Venue	Competition	Date	Result	Score
1	Australia	Johannesburg, South Africa	Ellis Park Stadium	2025 Rugby Championship	16 August 2025	Loss	22–38
2	New Zealand	Wellington, New Zealand	Wellington Regional Stadium	2025 Rugby Championship	13 September 2025	Win	10–43
3	Japan	London, England	Wembley Stadium	2025 end-of-year tests	1 November 2025	Win	7–61
4	France	Saint-Denis, France	Stade de France	2025 end-of-year tests	8 November 2025	Win	17–32
5	Wales	Cardiff, Wales	Millennium Stadium	2025 end-of-year tests	29 November 2025	Win	0–73
6	New Zealand	Johannesburg, South Africa	Ellis Park Stadium	2026 New Zealand tour of South Africa	22 August 2026	Loss	16–33

== Honours ==
Club

Harlequins: 1x Gallagher Premiership (2020-2021)

Country

South Africa 1x Rugby World Cup (2023) 1x 2025 Rugby Championship winner

== Personal life ==
Esterhuizen and his wife Mabea have three children.
