= List of South Africa national rugby union team records =

South Africa (known as the Springboks) are a rugby union national team that played their first international match in 1891.

The records listed below only include performances in test matches. The top ten are listed in each category (except when there is a tie for the last place among the five or ten, when all the tied record holders are noted).

== Team records ==
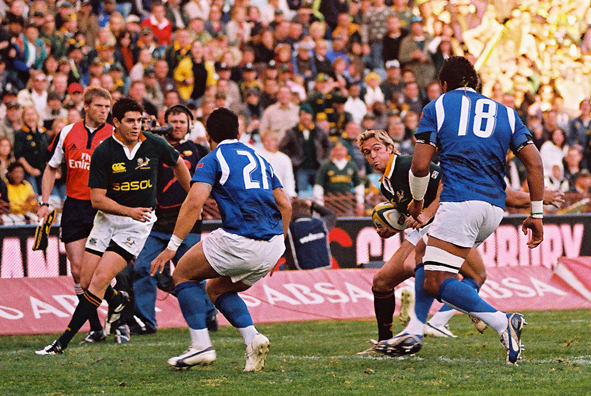
Jaque Fourie and Percy Montgomery (in green) playing for South Africa against Samoa

Greatest winning margin
| # | Points margin (score) | Opposing team | Venue | Date |
|---|---|---|---|---|
| 1 | 131 (134–3) | Uruguay | Buffalo City Stadium, East London | 11 June 2005 |
| 2 | 101 (101–0) | Italy | Kings Park Stadium, Durban | 19 June 1999 |
| 3 | 92 (105–13) | Namibia | Newlands Stadium, Cape Town | 15 August 2007 |
| 4 | 87 (87–0) | Namibia | North Harbour Stadium, Auckland | 22 September 2011 |
| 5 | 83 (96–13) | Wales | Loftus Versfeld Stadium, Pretoria | 27 June 1998 |
| 6 | 76 (76–0) | Romania | Stade Atlantique, Bordeaux | 17 September 2023 |
| 7 | 73 (73–0) | Wales | Millennium Stadium, Cardiff | 29 November 2025 |
| 8 | 71 (74–3) | Italy | Boet Erasmus, Port Elizabeth | 12 June 1999 |
| 9 | 66 (72–6) | Uruguay | Subiaco Oval, Perth | 11 October 2003 |
| 10 | 64 (74–10) | Tonga | Newlands Stadium, Cape Town | 10 June 1997 |
| 10 | 64 (64–0) | United States | London Stadium, London | 7 October 2015 |

Greatest losing margin
| # | Points margin (score) | Opposing team | Venue | Date |
|---|---|---|---|---|
| 1 | 57 (0–57) | New Zealand | North Harbour Stadium, Albany | 16 September 2017 |
| 2 | 50 (3–53) | England | Twickenham Stadium, London | 23 November 2002 |
| 3 | 49 (0–49) | Australia | Lang Park, Brisbane | 15 July 2006 |
| 4 | 42 (15–57) | New Zealand | Kings Park Stadium, Durban | 8 October 2016 |
| 5 | 36 (16–52) | New Zealand | Loftus Versfeld Stadium, Pretoria | 19 July 2003 |
| 6 | 35 (3–38) | Ireland | Aviva Stadium, Ireland | 11 November 2017 |
| 7 | 33 (7–40) | New Zealand | Wellington Regional Stadium, Wellington | 30 July 2011 |
| 8 | 28 (0–28) | New Zealand | Carisbrook, Dunedin | 10 July 1999 |
| 8 | 28 (13–41) | New Zealand | Rugby League Park, Christchurch | 17 September 2016 |
| 10 | 27 (6–33) | New Zealand | Lancaster Park, Christchurch | 14 July 2007 |

== Individual records ==
Most Caps
| # | Name | Period | Caps | Starts | Subs | Position |
|---|---|---|---|---|---|---|
| 1 | Eben Etzebeth | 2012– | 148 | 137 | 11 | Lock |
| 2 | Victor Matfield | 2001–2015 | 127 | 121 | 6 | Lock |
| 3 | Bryan Habana | 2004–2016 | 124 | 122 | 2 | Wing/Centre |
| 4 | Tendai Mtawarira | 2008–2019 | 117 | 102 | 15 | Prop |
| 5 | John Smit | 2000–2011 | 111 | 94 | 17 | Hooker/Prop |
| 6 | Siya Kolisi | 2013– | 110 | 95 | 15 | Loose Forward |
| 7 | Jean de Villiers | 2002–2015 | 109 | 105 | 4 | Centre/Wing |
| 8 | Damian de Allende | 2014– | 106 | 97 | 9 | Centre |
| 9 | Pieter-Steph du Toit | 2013– | 105 | 83 | 22 | Flanker/Lock |
| 10 | Percy Montgomery | 1997–2008 | 102 | 90 | 12 | Fullback/Fly-Half/Centre |

Most Points
| # | Name | Period | Points | Caps | Tries | Con | Pen | DG | Ave |
|---|---|---|---|---|---|---|---|---|---|
| 1 | Percy Montgomery | 1997–2008 | 893 | 102 | 25 | 153 | 148 | 6 | 8.75 |
| 2 | Handré Pollard | 2014– | 844 | 88 | 8 | 132 | 175 | 5 | 9.59 |
| 3 | Morné Steyn | 2009–2021 | 742 | 68 | 8 | 102 | 156 | 10 | 10.91 |
| 4 | Bryan Habana | 2004–2016 | 335 | 124 | 67 | 0 | 0 | 0 | 2.7 |
| 5 | Elton Jantjies | 2012–2022 | 331 | 46 | 2 | 66 | 62 | 1 | 7.2 |
| 6 | Naas Botha | 1980–1992 | 312 | 28 | 2 | 50 | 50 | 18 | 11.14 |
| 7 | Joel Stransky | 1993–1996 | 240 | 22 | 6 | 30 | 47 | 3 | 10.91 |
| 8 | Sacha Feinberg-Mngomezulu | 2024– | 232 | 28 | 10 | 64 | 18 | 0 | 8.04 |
| 9 | Braam van Straaten | 1999–2001 | 221 | 21 | 2 | 23 | 55 | 0 | 10.52 |
| 10 | Joost van der Westhuizen | 1993–2003 | 190 | 89 | 38 | 0 | 0 | 0 | 2.38 |

Most Tries
| # | Name | Period | Tries | Caps | Per game | Position |
|---|---|---|---|---|---|---|
| 1 | Bryan Habana | 2004–2017 | 67 | 124 | 54% | Wing/Centre |
| 2 | Joost van der Westhuizen | 1993–2003 | 38 | 89 | 42.7% | Scrum-Half |
| 3 | Makazole Mapimpi | 2018– | 33 | 47 | 70.2% | Wing |
| 3 | Malcolm Marx | 2016– | 33 | 97 | 32% | Hooker |
| 5 | Jaque Fourie | 2003–2013 | 32 | 72 | 44.4% | Centre/Wing |
| 6 | Kurt-Lee Arendse | 2022– | 27 | 38 | 71.1% | Wing |
| 6 | Jean de Villiers | 2002–2015 | 27 | 109 | 24.8% | Centre/Wing |
| 8 | Breyton Paulse | 1997–2007 | 26 | 64 | 40.6% | Wing/Fullback |
| 9 | Jesse Kriel | 2015– | 25 | 97 | 25.8% | Centre |
| 9 | Percy Montgomery | 1997–2008 | 25 | 102 | 24.5% | Fullback/Fly-Half/Centre |

Most Matches as Captain
| # | Name | Period | Apps | Wins | Win % | Position |
|---|---|---|---|---|---|---|
| 1 | John Smit | 2003–2011 | 83 | 54 | 65.1% | Hooker/Tighthead Prop |
| 2 | Siya Kolisi | 2018– | 78 | 57 | 73.1% | Loose Forward |
| 3 | Jean de Villiers | 2012–2015 | 37 | 24 | 64.9% | Centre |
| 4 | Gary Teichmann | 1996–1999 | 36 | 26 | 72.2% | Eighth Man |
| 5 | Francois Pienaar | 1993–1996 | 29 | 19 | 65.5% | Flanker |
| 6 | Victor Matfield | 2007–2015 | 23 | 17 | 73.9% | Lock |
| 7 | Dawie de Villiers | 1965–1970 | 22 | 13 | 59.1% | Scrum-Half |
| 8 | Corné Krige | 1999–2003 | 18 | 7 | 38.9% | Flanker |
| 9 | André Vos | 1999–2001 | 16 | 9 | 56.3% | Loose Forward |
| 10 | Morné du Plessis | 1975–1980 | 15 | 13 | 86.7% | Eighth Man |

=== Match Records ===
Most Points in a Single Match
| # | Player | Points | Opposing team | Venue | Date | Result |
|---|---|---|---|---|---|---|
| 1 | Sacha Feinberg-Mngomezulu | 37 | Argentina | Kings Park Stadium, Durban | 27 September 2025 | 67–30 |
| 2 | Percy Montgomery | 35 | Namibia | Newlands Stadium, Cape Town | 15 August 2007 | 105–13 |
| 3 | Jannie de Beer | 34 | England | Stade de France, Saint-Denis | 24 October 1999 | 44–21 |
| 4 | Percy Montgomery | 31 | Wales | Loftus Versfeld Stadium, Pretoria | 27 June 1998 | 96–13 |
| 4 | Morné Steyn | 31 | New Zealand | Kings Park Stadium, Durban | 1 August 2009 | 31–19 |
| 4 | Handré Pollard | 31 | Argentina | Estadio Padre Ernesto Martearena, Salta | 10 August 2019 | 46–13 |
| 7 | Tonderai Chavhanga | 30 | Uruguay | Basil Kenyon Stadium, East London | 11 June 2005 | 134–3 |
| 8 | Gaffie du Toit | 29 | Italy | Boet Erasmus Stadium, Port Elizabeth | 12 June 1999 | 74–3 |
| 8 | Percy Montgomery | 29 | Samoa | Parc des Princes, Paris | 9 September 2007 | 59–7 |
| 10 | Sacha Feinberg-Mngomezulu | 28 | Wales | Millennium Stadium, Cardiff | 29 November 2025 | 73–0 |
| 10 | Gavin Johnson | 28 | Samoa | Ellis Park Stadium, Johannesburg | 13 April 1995 | 60–8 |
| 10 | Morné Steyn | 28 | Argentina | FNB Stadium, Johannesburg | 17 August 2013 | 73–13 |

Most Tries in a Single Match
| # | Player | Tries | Opposing team | Venue | Date | Result |
|---|---|---|---|---|---|---|
| 1 | Tonderai Chavhanga | 6 | Uruguay | Buffalo City Stadium, East London | 11 June 2005 | 134–3 |
| 2 | Stefan Terblanche | 5 | Italy | Kings Park Stadium, Durban | 19 June 1999 | 101–0 |
| 3 | Chester Williams | 4 | Samoa | Ellis Park Stadium, Johannesburg | 10 June 1995 | 42–14 |
| 3 | Pieter Rossouw | 4 | France | Parc des Princes, Paris | 22 November 1997 | 52–10 |
| 3 | Stefan Terblanche | 4 | Ireland | Free State Stadium, Bloemfontein | 13 June 1998 | 37–13 |
| 3 | Bryan Habana | 4 | Samoa | Parc des Princes, Paris | 9 September 2007 | 59–7 |
| 3 | Jongi Nokwe | 4 | Australia | Ellis Park Stadium, Johannesburg | 30 August 2008 | 53–8 |
| 8 | 20 players | 3 | 28 occasions | | | |
