= Eben Etzebeth =

South African rugby union player (born 1991)

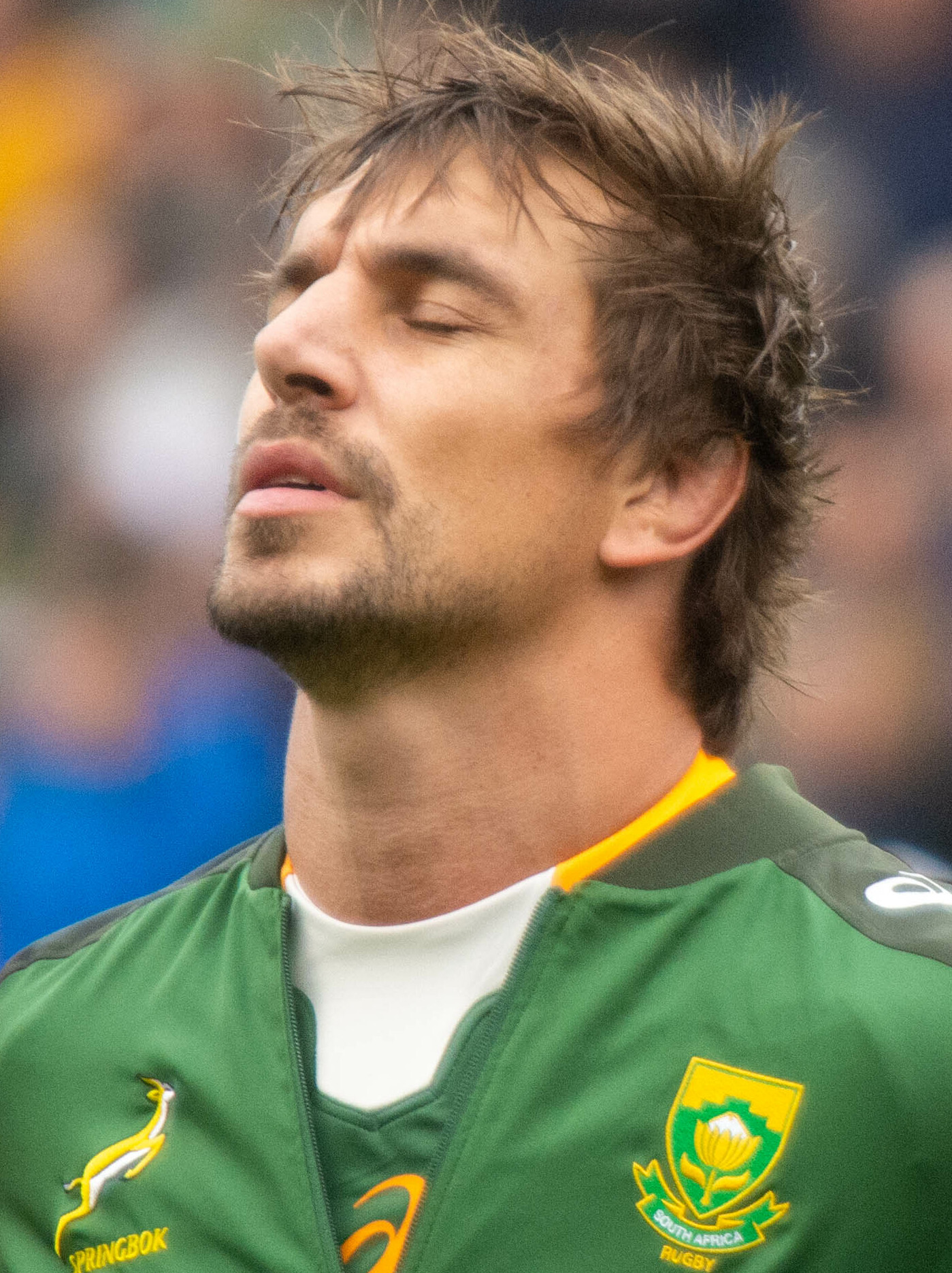
- Etzebeth playing for South Africa in 2022
- Born: 29 October 1991 (age 35) Cape Town, Cape Province, South Africa
- Height: 2.04 m (6 ft 8 1/2 in)
- Weight: 119 kg (262 lb; 18 st 10 lb)
- School: Hoërskool Tygerberg
- University: University of Cape Town
- Occupation: Professional rugby player

Rugby union career
- Position: Lock
- Current team: Sharks
Youth career
- 2009–2011: Western Province
Amateur team(s)
Years	Team	Apps	(Points)
2011	UCT Ikey Tigers	7	(5)
Senior career
Years	Team	Apps	(Points)
2012–2014	Western Province	7	(0)
2012–2019	Stormers	61	(20)
2015–2016	Red Hurricanes Osaka	8	(5)
2019–2022	Toulon	41	(35)
2022–	Sharks	31	(30)
- Correct as of 7 December 2024
International career
Years	Team	Apps	(Points)
2011	South Africa U20	5	(5)
2012–	South Africa	147	(45)
- Correct as of 27 September 2026
Medal record
Men's Rugby 15's
Representing South Africa
Rugby World Cup
Bronze medal – third place	2015 England	Squad
Gold medal – first place	2019 Japan	Squad
Gold medal – first place	2023 France	Squad

Eben Etzebeth (born 29 October 1991) is a South African professional rugby union player who currently plays for the Sharks in the United Rugby Championship and the South Africa national team. He made his international debut for the Springboks in 2012 and has since played 147 caps, making him the Springboks' most capped player. His regular playing position is as a loosehead lock (number 4 in South Africa).

== Early life ==
Etzebeth was born into a family of professional wrestlers and grew up in Parow. He was a late bloomer in terms of height and weight, as he was a winger, centre or even a fly-half when he started 7th grade equivalent, as he stood only 1.5m tall at around 56kg in the school's B-team. He was also a sprinter and high jumper. In 11th grade he had a 50cm growth spurt and gained 50kg of mass, which facilitated his move from the backs to becoming a lock.

== Club career ==
=== Western Province and Stormers ===
Etzebeth entered the Western Province youth structures in 2009, featuring in the Under-18 Craven Week tournament. In 2011, his career moved up a gear when he was part of the UCT Ikey Tigers side which won the Varsity Cup, however injury stalled his progress in the second half of the year and he was unable to play any part in the 2011 Currie Cup.

His injury didn't stop him from being named in the Stormers squad for the 2012 Super Rugby season. He recovered from injury in time for the start of the campaign and debuted on 25 February 2012 against the Hurricanes. In total, he made 13 appearances during the season and managed to score 1 try as the Stormers won 14 of their 16 league matches before eventually losing to the Sharks in the semi-finals.

International commitments kept him out of the early stages of the 2012 Currie Cup, but he returned at the tail-end of the tournament, winning his first 3 Western Province caps and helping them to lift their first Currie Cup title since 2002. He was awarded the Man of the Match award as Province gained revenge on the Sharks with a 25–18 win in Durban.

Injury ruled Etzebeth out of the first half of the 2013 Super Rugby season, but he returned for the second half of the campaign, playing 8 matches and scoring 1 try. He also won a team-high 47 lineouts and effected 8 steals on opposition throws. For the 2013 Currie Cup, Etzebeth was again missing for large chunks of the season due to Springbok commitments, however he once again returned for the final 3 matches of the season. This time he was unable to stop the Sharks from regaining the Currie Cup by turning the tables on Western Province with a 33–19 win in Cape Town.

The first 6 months of 2014 saw Etzebeth a foot injury sustained while on international duty in November 2013 ruled him out of the entire campaign. He remained committed to both of his Cape Town-based sides and in April 2013, he signed a deal that would keep him tied to Western Province and the Stormers until 2016.

=== NTT Docomo Red Hurricanes Osaka ===
In July 2015, he signed a deal to play for NTT DoCoMo Red Hurricanes Osaka in the Japanese Top League.

=== Toulon ===
In December 2018, Top 14 side Toulon announced Etzebeth would join them after the 2019 Rugby World Cup. In January 2021, he made a start at Blindside Flank for the first time after teammate Swan Rebbadj got injured prior to kick off.

=== Sharks ===
In February 2022, the Sharks signed Etzebeth on a long-term contract until 2027. On the 24 May 2024 Etzebeth captained the Sharks in their Challenge Cup final win over Gloucester Rugby, becoming the first South African team to win a major European rugby trophy.

== International career ==
=== South Africa U20s ===
Eben Etzebeth was a member of the South Africa Under 20 team that competed in the 2011 IRB Junior World Championship in Italy where the Baby Boks finished in 5th place.

=== Springboks ===
Etzebeth was called up to the Springbok squad for the first time by new head coach Heyneke Meyer ahead of the three match series against England in June 2012.

He made his first appearance in the second row alongside fellow debutant Juandré Kruger on 9 June 2012 at Kings Park Stadium, Durban. South Africa were victorious by 22–17. Despite suffering from some injury setbacks along the way, Etzebeth has maintained his position as first choice in the number 4 jersey throughout his Springbok career. By the end of the 2014 Rugby Championship he had made 29 appearances for his national team and is yet to score a try. Uniquely he has made more international appearances than he has Super Rugby and Currie Cup appearances combined. He also debuted for South Africa before he had played any Vodacom Cup or Currie Cup rugby for Western Province.

On 23 November 2013 he was nominated for the 2013 IRB Player of the Year award along with Leigh Halfpenny, Sergio Parisse, Kieran Read and Ben Smith. At 25 years of age, Etzebeth was able to bench press 385 pounds (175 kg), and perform incline dumbbell chest presses with 175 pounds (79 kg) dumbbells in 2018.

Etzebeth was selected by the Springboks in the 31-man squad for the 2015 Rugby World Cup, making an appearance in every one of the team's pool matches, including one off the bench in South Africa's historic 32–34 loss to Japan. After starting in the rest of the pool matches, Etzebeth started in the quarter-final win against Wales and the semi-final 18–20 narrow loss to New Zealand. On 30 October 2015, with the Springboks having been knocked out of the chance to win the World Cup for the second time, Etzebeth started in a locking partnership with retiring captain Victor Matfield against Argentina for the Bronze Final. Etzebeth played the full 80 minutes of the bronze final and scored a try in the 43rd minute, helping South Africa to win third place in the competition.

Etzebeth played his 50th test for South Africa, against Australia in round 3 of the 2016 Rugby Championship and became the youngest South African player in history to reach the milestone, being only 24 years old at the time. The match was a disappointment for the Springboks and for Etzebeth, who was yellow-carded in the 41st minute of their 17–23 loss against the Wallabies.

After captaining the Springboks to beat France 35–12 in the final match of a three-test series between the two sides, Etzebeth was named as captain of the Springboks for the 2017 Rugby Championship, replacing newly appointed captain Warren Whiteley who was ruled out of the competition with an injury sustained in the second test of the French series. Whiteley failed to recover prior to the end of the 2017 season so this saw Etzebeth carry a huge workload for South Africa in 2017, playing the full 80 minutes of every match in the 2017 Rugby Championship and three-test French series. Etzebeth's 2017 campaign included what was arguably the best performance of his career in a narrow 24–25 loss to New Zealand in Cape Town.

After playing the full 80 minutes in South Africa's 3–38 loss to Ireland and 18–17 win over France on the end-of-year-tour, Etzebeth was finally subbed off for the first time in 2017 where he was replaced by Franco Mostert in a 35–6 win over Italy. Etzebeth was subbed off at half-time in the final test of 2017 where South Africa lost 22–24 against Wales, picking up a back injury.

In addition to full international matches, Etzebeth has played in non-cap matches against a World XV in Cape Town 2015 and the Barbarians in London in 2016.

Etzebeth was named in South Africa's squad for the 2019 Rugby World Cup. South Africa went on to win the tournament, defeating England in the final.

On 16 July 2022, Etzebeth won his 100th cap for South Africa in a 30–14 win over Wales becoming only the 7th Springbok to reach this milestone.

On 28 September 2024, Etzebeth won his 128th cap for South Africa in a match against Argentina in Nelspruit surpassing Victor Matfield as the most capped Springbok. The match was a success, winning 48-7 and securing the 2024 Rugby Championship.

Etzebeth was handed a 12-week ban following an eye gouge in South Africa's 73–0 victory over Wales in November 2025, an act he claimed was reckless rather than intentional. Etzebeth stated during the hearing he feared being ‘rag-dolled’ by Mann.

== Honours ==
Western Province

- 2012 Currie Cup winner

Sharks

- European Challenge Cup: 2023–24

South Africa

- 2019 Rugby Championship winner
- 2019 Rugby World Cup winner
- 2021 British & Irish Lions tour to South Africa winner
- 2023 Rugby World Cup winner
- 2024 Rugby Championship winner
- 2025 Rugby Championship winner
- SA Rugby Awards
  - SA Rugby Men's Player of the Year: 2022, 2023

== Springbok statistics ==
=== Test Match Record ===
As of 27 September 2026

Against	P	W	D	L	Tri	Pts	% won
Argentina	25	20	1	4	2	10	80
Australia	23	11	2	10	2	10	47.83
British & Irish Lions	3	2	0	1	0	0	66.67
England	13	8	1	4	1	5	61.54
France	8	7	0	1	2	10	87.5
Georgia	2	2	0	0	0	0	100
Ireland	12	5	0	7	0	0	41.67
Italy	6	6	0	0	0	0	100
Japan	3	2	0	1	0	0	66.67
Namibia	1	1	0	0	0	0	100
New Zealand	29	11	1	17	0	0	37.93
Samoa	2	2	0	0	0	0	100
Scotland	7	7	0	0	0	0	100
United States	1	1	0	0	0	0	100
Wales	13	9	0	4	2	10	69.23
Total	147	94	5	48	9	45	63.95

Pld = Games played, W = Games won, D = Games drawn, L = Games lost, Tri = Tries scored, Pts = Points scored

=== Test tries ===
Try	Opposition	Location	Venue	Competition	Date	Result
1	Australia	Brisbane, Australia	Suncorp Stadium	2015 Rugby Championship	18 July 2015	Lost 20–24
2	Argentina	London, United Kingdom	Olympic Stadium	2015 Rugby World Cup	30 October 2015	Won 24–13
3	France	Johannesburg, South Africa	Ellis Park	Test match	24 June 2017	Won 35–12
4	England	London, England	Twickenham	2022 November tests	26 November 2022	Won 27–13
5	Argentina	Johannesburg, South Africa	Ellis Park	2023 Rugby Championship	29 July 2023	Won 22–21
6	France	Paris, France	Stade de France	2023 Rugby World Cup	15 October 2023	Won 29–28
7	Wales	Cardiff, Wales	Millennium Stadium	2024 Autumn Nations Series	23 November 2024	Won 45–12
8	Australia	Cape Town, South Africa	Cape Town Stadium	2025 Rugby Championship	23 August 2025	Won 30–22
9	Wales	Cardiff, Wales	Millennium Stadium	2025 Autumn Nations Series	29 November 2025	Won 73–0

== Super Rugby statistics ==
As of December 2019

Season	Team	Games	Starts	Sub	Mins	Tries	Points	Yellow card	Red card
2012	Stormers	13	13	1	923	1	5	0	0
2013	Stormers	8	7	1	591	1	5	0	0
2014	Stormers	Did not play							
2015	Stormers	11	10	1	792	0	0	0	0
2016	Stormers	10	10	0	741	2	10	0	0
2017	Stormers	12	12	0	909	0	0	1	0
2018	Stormers	Did not play							
2019	Stormers	8	6	2	430	0	0	0	0
Total		61	57	4	4306	4	20	14	2

Rugby Union Captain
Preceded by Warren Whiteley	Springbok Captain; 2017	Next: Pieter-Steph du Toit

== Personal life ==
Etzebeth married actress and singer Anlia van Rensburg on Saturday 4 February 2023 at the La Paris estate in Franschhoek, Western Cape. Their first child, a daughter was born in January 2024. In February 2025, they announced they were expecting a second child. That October, their second daughter was born.

Van Rensburg sang the South African national anthem on Etzebeth's 100th test cap.
