= Sacha Feinberg-Mngomezulu =

South African rugby union player (born 2002)

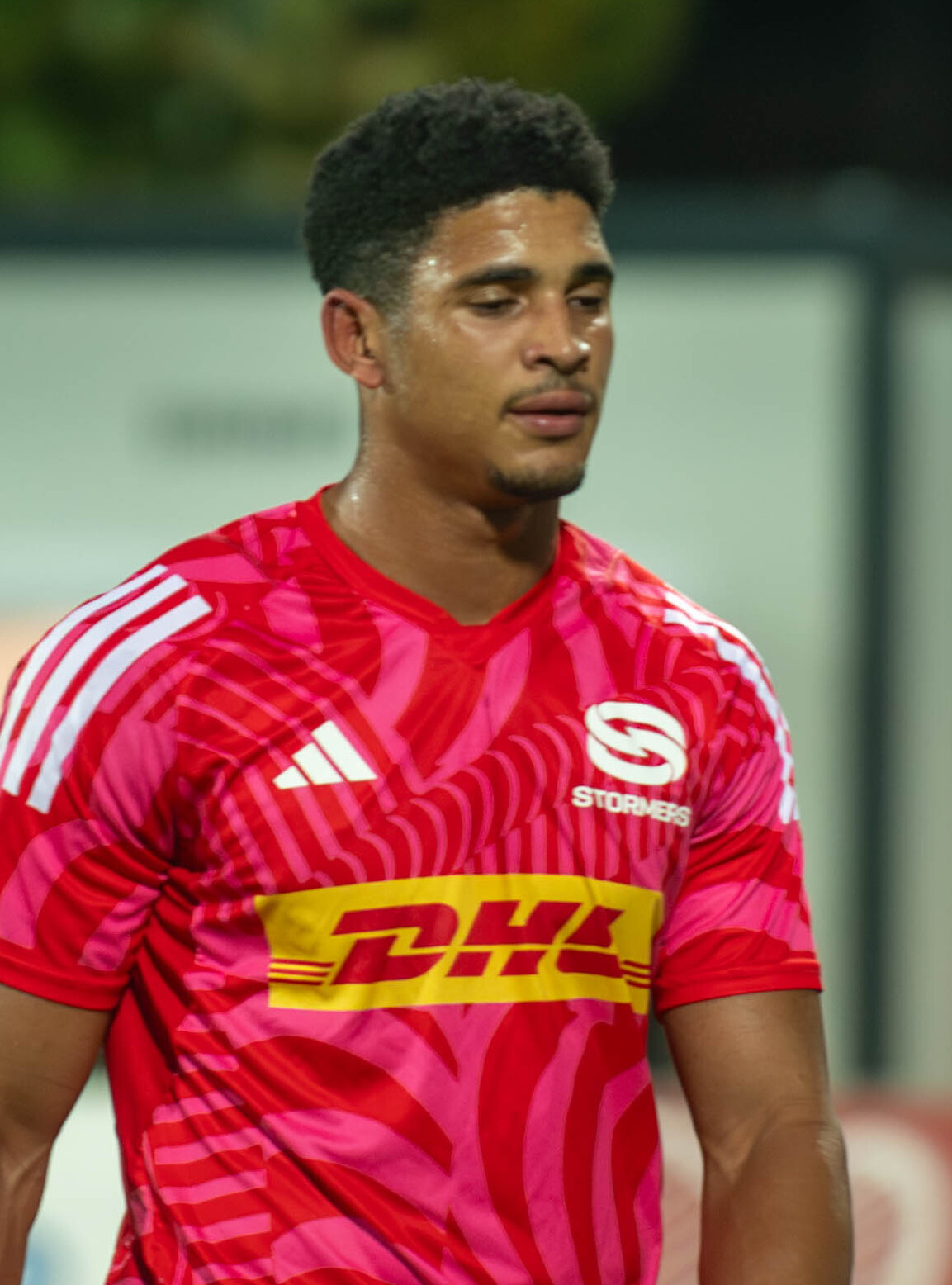
- Feinberg-Mngomezulu in 2025
- Full name: Sacha Feinberg-Mngomezulu
- Born: 22 February 2002 (age 24) Cape Town, Western Cape, South Africa
- Height: 185 cm (6 ft 1 in)
- Weight: 94 kg (207 lb; 14 st 11 lb)
- School: Diocesan College; Llandovery College

Rugby union career
- Position(s): Fly-half, Centre, Fullback
- Current team: Stormers, Western Province
Youth career
- 2020: South Africa U18
Senior career
Years	Team	Apps	(Points)
2021–	Western Province	11	(67)
2022–	Stormers	56	(435)
- Correct as of 7 November 2026
International career
Years	Team	Apps	(Points)
2021-2022	South Africa U20	4	(36)
2024–	South Africa	26	(221)
- Correct as of 7 November 2026

Sacha Feinberg-Mngomezulu (born 22 February 2002) is a South African professional rugby union player who plays for Western Province in the Currie Cup, the Stormers in the United Rugby Championship (URC), and the South Africa national team. He currently holds the record for the most points scored in a game by a South African player with 37.

== Early years and education ==
Feinberg-Mngomezulu's grandfather was the author, poet and graphic artist Barry Feinberg. As member of the South African Communist Party (SACP) and African National Congress (ANC), he spent an extended period in exile and was involved in the anti-apartheid struggle. Feinberg-Mngomezulu's father, Nick Feinberg, is a radio presenter and was born in London.

Educated at Bishops Diocesan College, he also spent 3 months as an exchange student at Llandovery College in Wales.

== Club career ==
=== Stormers ===
Feinberg-Mngomezulu was named in the Western Province squad for the 2021 Currie Cup Premier Division. He made his debut for in Round 6 of the Currie Cup against the Free State Cheetahs. Feinberg-Mngomezulu's contract with the Stormers was extended until 2027.

== International career ==
Feinberg-Mngomezulu is eligible to play for both South Africa, by birth, and England, through his father. In 2022, it was reported that England head coach Eddie Jones had approached him about the possibility of playing for England which he rejected.

In October 2022, he was selected for the South Africa senior training squad for the 2022 Autumn Internationals.

He was called up for the Springbok alignment camp in March 2024, and made his debut in the June 2024 against Wales, coming on as a substitute, scoring one penalty and two conversions.

In September 2025, he set a new record, scoring 37 points, the most by any South African player in an individual game during a 67–30 victory against Argentina in the 2025 Rugby Championship. This overtook the previous record of 35 set by Percy Montgomery against Namibia. In the final round of the tournament, he started the match, kicking a penalty and three conversions as they beat Argentina 29–27 to win the championship. In November 2025, he scored two tries in a 61–7 victory against Japan during the 2025 Autumn Nations Series. The following week, he scored another try during a 32–17 victory against France. Two weeks later, he scored another try in a 24–13 victory against Ireland. In that week, he was also named in the World Rugby Dream team of the Year at fly half. In the final fixture of the Autumn campaign, he scored another two tries in a 73–0 victory against Wales. In doing so, he broke the record for the most tries scored by any Springbok fly half with nine, overtaking the previous record jointly held by Morné Steyn and Handré Pollard.

== Honours ==
South Africa

- 2025 Rugby Championship winner
- MyPlayers Players' Choice Awards
  - Men’s Fifteens Players’ Player of the Year 2025
- SA Rugby Awards
  - SA Rugby Young Player of the Year: 2024
  - SA Vodacom URC Player of the Season: 2025

== Test match record ==
As of 15 November 2026

Opponent	P	W	D	L	Try	Con	Pen	DG	Pts	%Won
Argentina	3	3	0	0	3	12	4	0	51	100
Australia	4	3	0	1	0	7	2	0	20	75
France	2	1	0	1	1	5	2	0	21	50
Georgia	1	1	0	0	0	1	0	0	2	100
Ireland	3	2	0	1	1	1	0	0	7	66.67
Italy	2	2	0	0	1	9	1	0	26	100
Japan	1	1	0	0	2	3	0	0	16	100
New Zealand	8	6	0	2	0	8	7	0	37	75
Portugal	1	1	0	0	0	5	0	0	10	100
Wales	2	2	0	0	2	11	1	0	35	100
Total	27	22	0	5	10	62	17	0	225	81.48

=== International tries ===
As of 8 November 2026

Try	Opposing team	Location	Venue	Competition	Date	Result	Score
1	Argentina	Durban, South Africa	Kings Park Stadium	2025 Rugby Championship	27 September 2025	Win	67–30
2	Argentina	Durban, South Africa	Kings Park Stadium	2025 Rugby Championship	27 September 2025	Win	67–30
3	Argentina	Durban, South Africa	Kings Park Stadium	2025 Rugby Championship	27 September 2025	Win	67–30
4	Japan	London, England	Wembley Stadium	2025 end-of-year tests	1 November 2025	Win	7–61
5	Japan	London, England	Wembley Stadium	2025 end-of-year tests	1 November 2025	Win	7–61
6	France	Saint-Denis, France	Stade de France	2025 end-of-year tests	8 November 2025	Win	17–32
7	Ireland	Dublin, Ireland	Aviva Stadium	2025 end-of-year tests	22 November 2025	Win	13–24
8	Wales	Cardiff, Wales	Millennium Stadium	2025 end-of-year tests	29 November 2025	Win	0–73
9	Wales	Cardiff, Wales	Millennium Stadium	2025 end-of-year tests	29 November 2025	Win	0–73
10	Italy	Turin, Italy	Juventus Stadium	2026 Nations Championship	7 November 2026	Win	7–66

== Personal life ==
His brother, Nathan Soan-Mngomezulu, appeared on the UK dating show Too Hot to Handle season 3.
