= Wilco Louw =

South African rugby union player

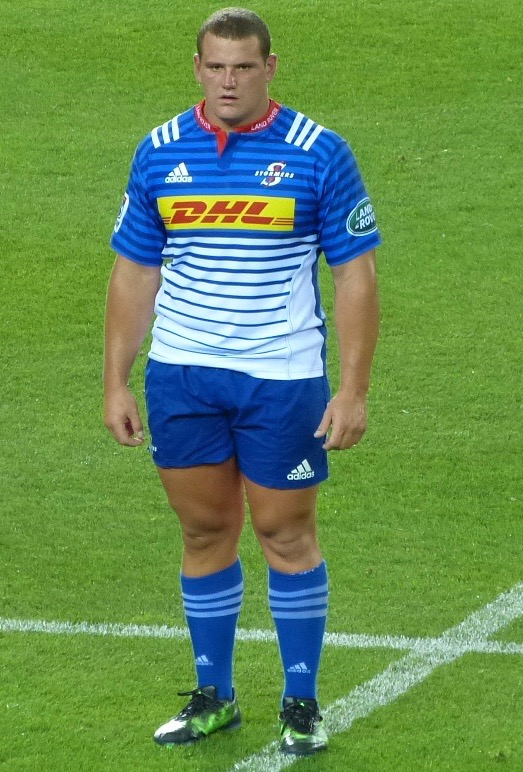
- Wilco Louw
- Full name: Wilco Mario Louw
- Born: 20 July 1994 (age 32) Ceres, South Africa
- Height: 1.85 m (6 ft 1 in)
- Weight: 130 kg (20 st 7 lb; 287 lb)
- School: HTS Drostdy, Worcester
- University: University of Pretoria

Rugby union career
- Position: Tighthead prop
- Current team: Stormers
Youth career
- 2012: Boland Cavaliers
- 2013–2014: Blue Bulls
- 2015: Western Province
Senior career
Years	Team	Apps	(Points)
2015–2019	Stormers	46	(30)
2015–2019	Western Province	57	(20)
2019	Toulon	5	(0)
2020–2023	Harlequins	66	(15)
2023–2026	Bulls	57	(10)
2026–	Stormers		
- Correct as of 26 July 2026
International career
Years	Team	Apps	(Points)
–	South Africa Schools	3	(0)
2014	South Africa Under-20	5	(0)
2017	South Africa 'A'	2	(0)
2017–	South Africa	27	(5)
- Correct as of 14 August 2021

Wilco Mario Louw (born 20 July 1994, in Ceres, South Africa) is a South African rugby union player. He currently plays for the South Africa national rugby union team and the Stormers in the United Rugby Championship. His regular position is tighthead prop.

== Career ==
=== Youth ===
In 2012, Louw got his first provincial representation when he was called up by Boland to represent them at the 2012 Craven Week competition in Port Elizabeth. Shortly after the competition, Louw was also named in the 2012 South African Schools squad. He played in three matches for them – against France, Wales, and England, helping South Africa to victories in all those matches.

After finishing school, Louw moved to Pretoria for the 2013 season to join the Blue Bulls. He made twelve appearances for the Blue Bulls U19 side during the 2013 Under-19 Provincial Championship, helping them win twelve matches in a row in the pool stages. He scored a try in their semi-final match with Leopards U19 to help the Blue Bulls reach the final with a 37–21 victory. He played off the bench in the final against the Golden Lions U19s, a match which the Blue Bulls won 35–23 to secure the championship.

In 2014, Louw was included in the South Africa Under-20 squad that participated in the 2014 IRB Junior World Championship held in New Zealand. He started their opening match against Scotland, before playing off the bench in a 33–24 victory against hosts and four-time winners New Zealand.

He once again started their final pool match, a 21–8 victory over Samoa as South Africa finished top of the group to set up a rematch with New Zealand in the semi-finals. Louw came on as a replacement in their semi-final to help South Africa secure their fourth consecutive victory over New Zealand at this level, winning 32–25.

He made his fifth appearance of the tournament in the final, but could not prevent South Africa finishing on the losing side this time, with England winning the championship for the second consecutive year with a 21–20 victory over South Africa.

Louw returned to domestic action after the Junior World Championship, making five starts for the Blue Bulls U21s during the 2014 Under-21 Provincial Championship and scoring a try against the Border U21 team as they reached the final of the competition and eventually winning the title by beating Western Province U21 in the final.

=== Western Province / Stormers ===
In October 2014, it was announced that Louw would return to the Western Cape by joining Western Province ahead of the 2015 season. He was named in the wider training group of their Super Rugby side the Stormers, and then included in their final squad for the season. He was then named on the bench for their season-opening match against the Bulls.

=== Harlequins ===
On 13 February 2020, Louw's signing for the 2020–21 season was announced by English Premiership Rugby club Harlequins. He started in the Premiership final and scored a try against Exeter on 26 June 2021 as Harlequins won the game 40-38 in the highest scoring Premiership final ever.

=== Vodacom Bulls ===
In July 2023, Louw returned to Pretoria, having signed with the Vodacom Bulls for the United Rugby Championship 2023-2024 season.

Louw expressed his enthusiasm regarding his return to South Africa and his reunion with the Vodacom Bulls. He noted that because his professional career began with the franchise, he is highly motivated to collaborate with the team's athletes and coaching staff to pursue championship titles.

=== International ===
Louw was called up to the Springboks for the 2017 Rugby Championship following Coenie Oosthuizen's broken arm. Louw made his debut for the Springboks off the bench in the final round of the tournament which was a 24–25 loss to New Zealand.

== Honours ==
- Currie Cup runner up 2015, 2018
- Currie Cup winner 2017
- Premiership Rugby Cup runner up 2019–20
- Premiership Rugby winner 2020–21
- Named in the 2023–24 United Rugby Championship Elite XV team
- 2025 Rugby Championship winner

== Statistics ==
=== Test match record ===
As of 15 November 2026

Opponent	P	W	D	L	Try	Pts	%Won
Argentina	5	4	0	1	0	0	80
Australia	5	2	0	3	0	0	40
England	3	2	0	1	0	0	66.67
France	3	2	0	1	0	0	66.67
Ireland	2	1	0	1	0	0	50
Italy	5	5	0	0	1	5	100
Japan	1	1	0	0	1	5	100
New Zealand	8	5	0	3	0	0	71.43
Scotland	1	1	0	0	0	0	100
Wales	5	3	0	2	1	5	60
Total	38	26	0	12	3	15	68.42

=== International tries ===
As of 8 November 2026

Try	Opposing team	Location	Venue	Competition	Date	Result	Score
1	Japan	London, England	Wembley Stadium	2025 end-of-year tests	1 November 2025	Win	7–61
2	Wales	Cardiff, Wales	Millennium Stadium	2025 end-of-year tests	29 November 2025	Win	0–73
3	Italy	Turin, Italy	Juventus Stadium	2026 Nations Championship	7 November 2026	Win	7–66
