= Canan Moodie =

South African rugby union player

- Full name: Canan Moodie
- Born: 5 November 2002 (age 24) Paarl, South Africa
- Height: 1.91 m (6 ft 3 in)
- Weight: 92 kg (14 st 7 lb; 203 lb)
- School: Hoër Landbouskool Boland

Rugby union career
- Position: Wing / Fullback / Outside Centre
- Current team: Bulls / Blue Bulls
Senior career
Years	Team	Apps	(Points)
2022–	Blue Bulls	4	(15)
2022–	Bulls	78	(180)
- Correct as of 10 October 2026
International career
Years	Team	Apps	(Points)
2022–	South Africa	26	(45)
- Correct as of 27 September 2026
Medal record
Men's Rugby union
Representing South Africa
Rugby World Cup
Gold medal – first place	2023 France	Squad

Canan Moodie (born 5 November 2002) is a South African professional rugby union player who currently plays for the Bulls in the URC and South Africa national team. His regular position is wing.

Canan Moodie was born and raised in Paarl, Western Cape, South Africa. He initially attended Paarl Boys' Primary School and then chose to board at Boland Agricultural High School. This allowed him to focus on rugby development, away from home. At school, he played rugby as a centre, winning a high school championship. He also represented the Western Province's youth teams in 2019 and 2020.

After completing high school, he joined the Blue Bulls Academy in Pretoria; competing in the 2021 RSA provincial under-20 championship.

In the same year, he was selected for the South African under-20 team to compete in the International Series, a COVID-19 induced replacement series for the Junior World Championship. He performed well, scoring two braces against Uruguay and Argentina.

Moodie was named in the Blue Bulls side for the 2022 Currie Cup Premier Division. He made his Currie Cup debut for the Blue Bulls against the Western Province in Round 2 of the 2022 Currie Cup Premier Division. During his first professional match on 19 January 2022 against Western Province, scoring on his debut.

Shortly after his professional debut, he joined the Bulls franchise during their first season of the United Rugby Championship (URC). He quickly became a starter in the team coached by Jake White. His side made the 2022 championship playoffs, finishing as runners-up.

Moodie is the youngest player in the South Africa national team at the age of 21 years old, as of January 2024.

== International career ==
In August 2022, he was included in the Springboks touring squad for away matches against Australia in the Rugby Championship. In his Test debut against Australia in Sydney, Moodie scored a try in the 38th minute.

He earned his first cap as the second youngest player to ever play for the Springboks.

In June 2023, he was included in the wider 40-player squad for the 2023 Rugby Championship and the Rugby World Cup training camp. Two months later, he was also named in the final 33-person South Africa squad for the 2023 World Cup in France.

== Test match record ==
As of 27 September 2026

Opponent	P	W	D	L	Try	Pts	%Won
Argentina	6	6	0	0	1	5	100
Australia	5	3	0	2	2	10	60
England	2	2	0	0	0	0	100
Georgia	1	1	0	0	1	5	100
Ireland	1	1	0	0	0	0	100
Italy	2	2	0	0	1	5	100
New Zealand	4	3	0	1	0	0	75
Romania	1	1	0	0	0	0	100
Scotland	1	1	0	0	0	0	100
Tonga	1	1	0	0	1	5	100
Wales	2	2	0	0	3	15	100
Total	26	23	0	3	9	45	88.46

== International tries ==
As of 29 November 2025

Try	Opposing team	Location	Venue	Competition	Date	Result	Score
1	Australia	Sydney, Australia	Sydney Football Stadium	2022 Rugby Championship	3 September 2022	Win	8–24
2	Argentina	Buenos Aires, Argentina	José Amalfitani Stadium	2023 Rugby World Cup warm-up matches	5 August 2023	Win	13–24
3	Wales	Cardiff, Wales	Millennium Stadium	2023 Rugby World Cup warm-up matches	19 August 2023	Win	16–52
4	Wales	Cardiff, Wales	Millennium Stadium	2023 Rugby World Cup warm-up matches	19 August 2023	Win	16–52
5	Tonga	Marseille, France	Stade Vélodrome	2023 Rugby World Cup Pool B match	1 October 2023	Win	49–18
6	Italy	Gqeberha, South Africa	Nelson Mandela Bay Stadium	2025 Italy tour of South Africa	12 July 2025	Win	45–0
7	Georgia	Mbombela, South Africa	Mbombela Stadium	2025 mid-year tests	19 July 2025	Win	55–10
8	Australia	Cape Town, South Africa	Cape Town Stadium	2025 Rugby Championship	23 August 2025	Win	30–22
9	Wales	Cardiff, Wales	Millennium Stadium	2025 end-of-year tests	29 November 2025	Win	0–73

== Honours ==
- International
  - Rugby World Cup champion 2023
  - 2× Rugby Championship champion 2024, 2025
- United Rugby Championship runner-up 2021–22
