= Harry Wilson (rugby union, born 1999) =

Australia international rugby union player

- Full name: Harrison Wilson
- Born: 22 November 1999 (age 27) Gunnedah, New South Wales, Australia
- Height: 1.96 m (6 ft 5 in)
- Weight: 115 kg (254 lb; 18 st 2 lb)
- School: St Joseph's College

Rugby union career
- Position(s): Number 8, Flanker
- Current team: Queensland Reds
Senior career
Years	Team	Apps	(Points)
2018–2019	Queensland Country	15	(25)
2020–	Queensland Reds	93	(130)
- Correct as of 15 June 2026
International career
Years	Team	Apps	(Points)
2019	Australia U20	5	(10)
2020–	Australia	45	(40)
- Correct as of 17 October 2026
Medal record
Men's rugby union
Representing Australia
Oceania U20 Championship
Winner	2019 Gold Coast
Junior World Cup
Runner-up	2019 Argentina

Harrison Wilson (born 22 November 1999) is an Australian professional rugby union player who plays as a number eight for Super Rugby club Queensland Reds and is the current captain of the Australia national team.

== Club career ==
In the 2020 COVID-19-interrupted Super Rugby season, Wilson made his senior debut for the Queensland Reds against the Brumbies in Canberra, starting at number eight. Wilson scored his first Reds try in the 77th minute set up a grandstand finish, but the Reds ultimately lost 27–24.

== International career ==
Wilson made his Wallabies debut on 11 October 2020, starting on the blindside flank in a 16–16 draw with New Zealand.

On 2 September 2023, Wilson made his debut for the Barbarians in a 48–12 victory over Northampton Saints at Franklin’s Gardens, coming off the bench in the second half.

Five days later, on 7 September, he made his first start for the side in a 52–26 win over the Bristol Bears at Ashton Gate, playing at number eight. He scored two tries in the first half, which were his first tries for the Barbarians.

Wilson made his fourth and final appearance for the Barbarians on 28 October 2023, starting in a 51–21 victory against Harlequins at Twickenham Stoop.

After being omitted from Eddie Jones' Rugby World Cup squad in 2023, Wilson was reselected under Joe Schmidt for 2024. He captained the Wallabies for the first time against Argentina during the 2024 Rugby Championship, which ended in a 19-20 win.

On 9 November 2024, Wilson scored his first try for Australia in a 42–37 victory over England at Twickenham during the Autumn Nations Series. His try in the 34th minute contributed to a comeback win, with the Wallabies securing the match in added time.

Wilson captained the Wallabies in all three tests against the British and Irish Lions in 2025. In August 2025, he captained the side and scored two tries in a 38–22 victory over South Africa, having been 22–0 down the first quarter, during the opening fixture of the 2025 Rugby Championship, ending a 62 year losing streak at Ellis Park Stadium.

== Personal life ==
In March 2026, Wilson starred in the reality TV sports show Rivals: Sport vs. Sport representing "Team Rugby Union" alongside Ashley Marsters, Desiree Miller, and Wallaby teammate Joseph-Aukuso Sua'ali'i.

Preceded by James Slipper	Australian national rugby union captain 2024-present	Succeeded by Incumbent
