= Too Hot to Handle season 3 =

Too Hot to Handle
- Season 3
- Promotional poster
- No. of contestants: 15
- Winners: Beaux Raymond; Harry Johnson
- Runner-up: Nathan Soan Mngomezulu
- No. of episodes: 10

Release
- Original network: Netflix
- Original release: 19 January 2022

Season chronology
- ← Previous; Season 2 Next → Season 4

The third season of Too Hot to Handle premiered on January 19, 2022. The season was ordered by Netflix in January 2021, and was filmed amid the COVID-19 pandemic on the Turks and Caicos Islands, right after season 2 wrapped.

== Cast ==
Cast member	Age	Residence	Entered	Exited	Status	Refs
Beaux Raymond	24	Kent, England	Episode 1	Episode 10	Winner	
Harry Johnson	29	Middlesbrough, England	Episode 1	Episode 10	Winner	
Nathan Soan Mngomezulu	24	Cape Town, South Africa	Episode 1	Episode 8	Eliminated	
Nathan Soan Mngomezulu	24	Cape Town, South Africa	Episode 9	Episode 10	Runner-up	
Georgia Hassarati	26	Brisbane, Australia	Episode 1	Episode 10	Third place	
Brianna Giscombe	28	California, US	Episode 6	Episode 10	Finalist	
Gerrie Labuschagné	26	Johannesburg, South Africa	Episode 6	Episode 10	Finalist	
Holly Scarfone	23	Colorado, USA	Episode 1	Episode 10	Finalist	
Izzy Fairthorne	22	Manchester, England	Episode 1	Episode 10	Finalist	
Jackson Mawhinney	29	London, England	Episode 6	Episode 10	Finalist	
Obi Nnadi	22	Toronto, Ontario, Canada	Episode 3	Episode 10	Finalist	
Olga Bednarska	24	Surrey, England	Episode 3	Episode 10	Finalist	
Stevan Ditter	26	Los Angeles, USA	Episode 1	Episode 10	Finalist	
Patrick Mullen	29	Hawaii, USA	Episode 1	Episode 8	Quit	
Jaz Holloway	25	Virginia, USA	Episode 1	Episode 5	Eliminated	
Robert "Truth" DuVaun	23	Texas, USA	Episode 1	Episode 5	Eliminated	

=== Future appearances ===
In 2023, Georgia Hassarati and Izzy Fairthorne appeared on the first season of Perfect Match. Holly Scarfone and Stevan Ditter appeared on the second season in 2024. In 2025, Hassarati appeared on the first season of Battle Camp.

== Episodes ==
No. overall	No. in season	Title	Prize money	Original release date
20	1	"No Pleasure Island"	$200,000	19 January 2022
21	2	"The Midnight Train to Georgia"	$197,000	19 January 2022
22	3	"The Truth Hurts"	$155,000	19 January 2022
23	4	"Eat My Shorts"	$143,000	19 January 2022
24	5	"The Summer of '69"	$74,000	19 January 2022
25	6	"Triple Threat"	$68,000	19 January 2022
26	7	"Yoni Live Once"	$46,000	19 January 2022
27	8	"Reaching Rock Bottom"	$0	19 January 2022
28	9	"Paradise Purgatory"	$0	19 January 2022
29	10	"Out with a Bang"	$90,000	19 January 2022

== After filming ==
Couples	Still together	Relationship notes
Holly Scarfone & Nathan Soan Mngomezulu	No	The two struck up a relationship immediately when entering the villa, and despite challenges the two have faced, they remained strong and ended the season together. On the reunion, they revealed they have broken up, but are open to a relationship again in the future.
Beaux Raymond & Harry Johnson	No	Raymond & Johnson started a relationship halfway through the season and ended the season in a relationship and won. On the reunion, they revealed they had broken up.
Brianna Giscombe & Obi Nnadi	No	Giscombe and Nnadi started their relationship soon after she entered the villa. They broke up after the season wrapped.
Izzy Fairthorne & Jackson Mawhinney	No	Fairthorne and Mawhinney started a relationship soon after he entered the villa. They revealed they are both single after filming.

In February 2021, Beaux Raymond, Harry Johnson, and Jackson Mawhinney caused a ruckus on a flight to the UK. They were fined £3,000 each and were arrested after landing.

In early 2022, Georgia Hassarati began dating season one contestant Harry Jowsey, but they broke up in November. They resumed their relationship in April 2023 but later broke up again two months later.

In October 2023, Nathan Soan Mngomezulu revealed he was dating season 5 contestant Elys Hutchinson, but broke up at some point in 2024.
