= Justo Piccardo =

Argentine rugby player (born 2002)

- Born: 25 March 2002 (age 24)
- Height: 183 cm (6 ft 0 in)
- Weight: 112 kg (247 lb)

Rugby union career
- Position: Centre
- Current team: Montpellier
Senior career
Years	Team	Apps	(Points)
2024-2025	Pampas		
2025-	Montpellier	3	(5)
International career
Years	Team	Apps	(Points)
2024-	Argentina	11	(10)

Justo Piccardo (born 25 March 2002) is an Argentine professional rugby union player. He plays as a centre for Montpellier and the Argentina national rugby union team.

== Club career ==
He played for Pampas in Super Rugby Americas in 2024. He was named to the All-Star team for SRA 2024 season and was also named Rookie of the Year in May 2024.

== International career ==
He was called up to the Argentina national rugby union team for the first time in July 2024. He made his international debut in the Autumn International against Ireland as a replacement in a narrow 22–19 defeat.

He was named in the Argentina squad ahead of their fixture against the British and Irish Lions in June 2025. He was named as a starter for the first time for their match against the Lions in Dublin on 20 June 2025.
