= Ignacio Ruiz (rugby union) =

Argentine rugby player (born 2001)

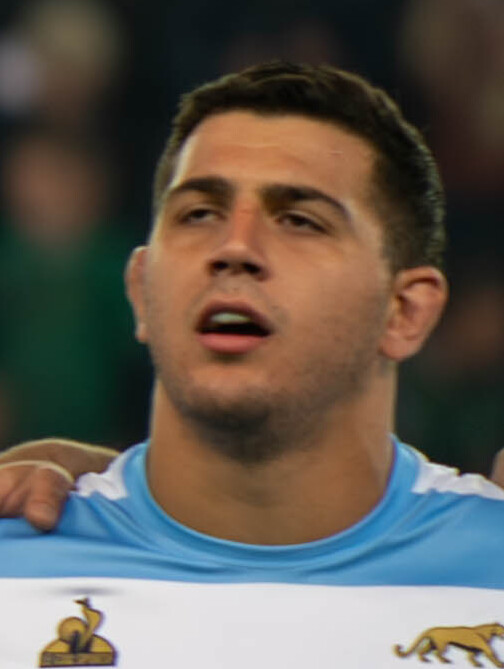
- Born: 3 January 2001 (age 25) Buenos Aires, Argentina
- Height: 1.88 m (6 ft 2 in)
- Weight: 104 kg (229 lb; 16 st 5 lb)

Rugby union career
- Position: Hooker
- Current team: Perpignan
Senior career
Years	Team	Apps	(Points)
2019–2022	Regatas Bella Vista	8	(5)
2020–2022	Jaguares XV	16	(25)
2022–2023	London Irish	7	(10)
2023–	Perpignan	36	(30)
- Correct as of 9 August 2024
International career
Years	Team	Apps	(Points)
2020–2021	Argentina XV	4	(45)
2022–	Argentina	22	(15)
- Correct as of 9 August 2024

Ignacio Ruiz (born 3 January 2001) is an Argentine professional rugby union player who plays as a hooker for Top 14 club Perpignan and the Argentina national team.

== Club career ==
Ruiz began his rugby career at Argentine URBA Top13 side Regatas de Bella Vista. In 2020 he joined SRA side Jagaures XV.

In 2022 he joined English Premiership side London Irish joining four other Argentine internationals. After the collapse of London Irish he moved to France joining Perpignan in the Top 14.

== International career ==
Ruiz made his debut against Scotland on Saturday 16 July 2022. He was named in the Argentina squad for the 2023 Rugby World Cup, he featured once against Chile where in which he scored.

== Career statistics ==
=== List of international tries ===
Try	Opposing team	Venue	Competition	Date	Result	Score
1	Scotland	Murrayfield, Scotland	2022 Autumn Nations Series	November 19, 2022	Loss	52 - 29
2	Chile	Stade de la Beaujoire, France	2023 Rugby World Cup	September 30, 2023	Win	59 - 5
