= Simón Benítez Cruz =

Argentine rugby player (born 1999)

- Born: 6 September 1999 (age 27) Buenos Aires, Argentina
- Height: 177 cm (5 ft 10 in)
- Weight: 83 kg (183 lb)

Rugby union career
- Position: Scrum-half
- Current team: Newcastle Red Bulls
Senior career
Years	Team	Apps	(Points)
-2024	Pampas		
2025	Tarucas		
2025-	Newcastle Red Bulls	21	(20)
International career
Years	Team	Apps	(Points)
2025-	Argentina	16	(5)
National sevens team
Years	Team		Comps
2022-	Argentina		

Simón Benítez Cruz (born 6 September 1999) is an Argentine professional rugby union player who plays as a scrum-half for Newcastle Red Bulls in the English Premiership.

== Club career ==
Benítez Cruz played for Pampas XV in 2024 and was named amongst the Super Rugby Americas 2024 All-Star squad of most effective players in May 2024. He was recruited by Tarucas later that year prior to their first season in the Super Rugby Americas. In February 2025, he played for Tarucas in their debut Super Rugby Americas match, a 45–6 win over Cobras in Tucumán. He was named MVP of Super Rugby Americas 2025.

Benítez Cruz signed for English club Newcastle Red Bulls ahead of the 2025-2026 Premiership season.

== International career ==
He played for the Argentina national rugby sevens team in the 2022 South American Rugby Championship in Costa Rica. Subsequently, he was named in the Argentina Sevens squad for the 2022 South Africa Sevens and his SVNS tournament debut.

He was called up to the Argentina national rugby union team for their fixture against the British and Irish Lions in June 2025. He was named as a replacement for their match against the Lions in Dublin on 20 June 2025.

== Personal life ==
He was born in Buenos Aires.
