= Francisco Coria Marchetti =

Argentina international rugby union player (born 2000)

- Born: 7 October 2000 (age 26) Tucuman, Argentina
- Height: 186 cm (6 ft 1 in)
- Weight: 125 kg (276 lb)

Rugby union career
- Position: Prop
- Current team: CA Brive
Senior career
Years	Team	Apps	(Points)
2020-	CA Brive	60	(5)
International career
Years	Team	Apps	(Points)
2024-	Argentina	9	(5)

Francisco Coria Marchetti (born 7 October 2000) is an Argentine professional rugby union rugbier who plays as a prop forward for French D2 club CA Brive and the Argentina national rugby union team.

== Club career ==
After playing rugby in Argentina and for Argentina U20, he signed on to the youth academy of French club CA Brive in 2020. After two and-a-half seasons with the club he signed a three-year professional contract in January 2023.

== International career ==
He made his debut for the Argentina national rugby union team in June 2024, as a replacement but scoring a try on debut against Uruguay in a 79–5 win. He was called up to the Argentina squad for their fixture against the British and Irish Lions in June 2025. He was named as a replacement for their match against the Lions in Dublin on 20 June 2025.

== Personal life ==
He is from Tucumán Province, Argentina. His older brother, Emiliano Coria, is also a professional rugby union player.
