= 2019–20 Premiership Rugby =

Rugby union competition in England

2019–20 Gallagher Premiership
- Countries: England
- Date: 18 October 2019 – 24 October 2020
- Champions: Exeter Chiefs (2nd title)
- Runners-up: Wasps
- Relegated: Saracens
- Matches played: 133
- Attendance: 1,037,010 (average 7,797 per match)
- Highest attendance: 75,500; Harlequins v Leicester Tigers; 28 December 2019
- Lowest attendance: 3,622; London Irish v Sale Sharks; 26 October 2019
- Tries scored: 757 (average 5.7 per match)
- Top point scorer: Rhys Priestland (Bath) (206 points)
- Top try scorer: Ollie Thorley (Gloucester), Ben Earl (Saracens & Bristol) (11 tries)

Official website
- www.premiershiprugby.com

The 2019–20 Gallagher Premiership was the 33rd season of the top flight English domestic rugby union competition and the second one to be sponsored by Gallagher. The reigning champions entering the season were Saracens, who had claimed their fifth title after defeating Exeter Chiefs in the 2019 final. London Irish had been promoted as champions from the 2018–19 RFU Championship at the first attempt.

The competition was broadcast by BT Sport for the seventh successive season and with five games also simulcast free-to-air on Channel 5. Highlights of each weekend's games were shown on Channel 5 with extended highlights on BT Sport.

== Summary ==
Exeter Chiefs won their second title after defeating Wasps in the final at Twickenham having also topped the regular season table. Saracens were automatically relegated after having failed to comply with prior years salary cap restrictions and were deducted a total of 105 points across two separate judgements. It was the second time that Saracens have been relegated from the top flight since the leagues began and the first time since the 1992–93 Premiership Rugby season.

Due to changes to the global rugby calendar and the COVID-19 pandemic, this season started and finished later than previous seasons and including the Premiership Rugby Cup, ran for 58 weeks in total.

On 5 November 2019, Premiership Rugby announced that Saracens would be deducted 35 points in the 2019–20 season and fined £5.3 million due to undisclosed payments to players in previous seasons. Saracens initially said they would appeal the ruling, but on 18 November announced that they accepted the punishments, with the deduction leaving them 26 points adrift at the bottom of the table. After further failure to comply with the salary cap, Saracens were announced to be automatically relegated at the end of the season on 18 January 2020 despite relegation not being an available sanction in the salary cap regulations. On 28 January 2020 this was confirmed with the application of a further 70 point deduction.

On 16 March 2020, the league was suspended for an initial five week period due to the COVID-19 pandemic. Resumption was originally scheduled for the weekend of 24/25/26 April but was later postponed indefinitely. The restart eventually took place on 14 August, with all games played behind closed doors and broadcast live on BT Sport. Channel 5 also broadcast 5 matches.

== Teams ==
Twelve teams compete in the league – the top eleven teams from the previous season and London Irish who were promoted from the 2018–19 RFU Championship after a top flight absence of one year. They replaced Newcastle Falcons who were relegated after six years in the top flight.

=== Stadiums and locations ===
2019–20 Gallagher Premiership Teams

Club	Director of Rugby/Head Coach	Captain	Kit supplier	Stadium	Capacity	City/Area
Bath	(England) Stuart Hooper	(England) Charlie Ewels	Canterbury	The Recreation Ground	14,509	Bath
Bristol Bears	(Samoa) Pat Lam	(New Zealand) Steve Luatua	Bristol Sport	Ashton Gate	27,000	Bristol
Exeter Chiefs	(England) Rob Baxter	(England) Jack Yeandle	Samurai Sportswear	Sandy Park	13,593 (Note: Sandy Park's capacity increased from 12,921 to 13,593 from December 2019 onward.)	Exeter
Gloucester	(England) George Skivington (Note: Skivington replaced Johan Ackermann as head coach in July 2020. Simultaneously, DoR David Humphreys also left the club.)	(England) Willi Heinz	Elite Pro Sports	Kingsholm	16,115	Gloucester
Harlequins	(England) Paul Gustard (Australia) Billy Millard	(England) Chris Robshaw	Adidas	Twickenham Stoop (Note: Harlequins would also play a home game at Twickenham Stadium, London on 28 December 2019)	14,800	Twickenham, Greater London
Leicester Tigers	(Ireland) Geordan Murphy (Note: Murphy was promoted to DoR on 1 July 2020)	(England) Tom Youngs	Kukri	Welford Road	25,849	Leicester
London Irish	(Ireland) Declan Kidney	(Scotland) Blair Cowan	BLK	Madejski Stadium (Note: London Irish's tenure at Madejski ended on 30 June 2020 and would therefore play 5 home games at Twickenham Stoop)	24,161	Reading
Northampton Saints	(New Zealand) Chris Boyd	(England) Teimana Harrison (England) Alex Waller	Macron	Franklin's Gardens	15,200	Northampton
Sale Sharks	(England) Steve Diamond	(South Africa) Jono Ross	Samurai Sportswear	AJ Bell Stadium	12,000	Salford, Greater Manchester
Saracens	(Ireland) Mark McCall	(England) Brad Barritt	Nike	Allianz Park	8,500 (Note: Allianz Park will have a reduced capacity this season due to redevelopment works)	Hendon, Greater London
Wasps	(England) Lee Blackett	(England) Dan Robson (Wales) Thomas Young	Under Armour	Ricoh Arena	32,609	Coventry
Worcester Warriors	(South Africa) Alan Solomons	(England) Ted Hill	VX3	Sixways Stadium	11,499	Worcester

== Preseason ==
The 2019 edition of the Premiership Rugby Sevens Series was held at Franklin's Gardens on 13 and 14 September 2019. For the third successive year all twelve Premiership teams would feature in one venue over two days. Teams would be split into four pools of three which played each other once in a round-robin basis with the tournament splitting into Cup and Plate competitions on the second day.

In a repeat of the 2018 final, Saracens beat Wasps 35–19 to win the 2019 Premiership Sevens Cup. Gloucester beat Sale Sharks to win the Plate. It was the third successive year Wasps had made the cup final of the competition.

== Table ==
2019–20 Premiership Rugby table
Pos	Team	Pld	W	D	L	PF	PA	PD	TF	TA	TB	LB	Pts	Qualification or relegation
1	Exeter Chiefs (C)	22	15	0	7	630	443	+187	83	56	9	5	74	Play-off place, Berth in the 2020–21 European Rugby Champions Cup
2	Wasps (RU)	22	14	0	8	662	497	+165	81	58	12	3	71	Play-off place, Berth in the 2020–21 European Rugby Champions Cup
3	Bristol Bears (SF)	22	14	1	7	561	457	+104	70	53	8	3	69	Play-off place, Berth in the 2020–21 European Rugby Champions Cup
4	Bath (SF)	22	14	1	7	520	457	+63	59	56	7	2	67	Play-off place, Berth in the 2020–21 European Rugby Champions Cup
5	Sale Sharks	22	13	0	9	546	375	+171	69	42	7	5	64	Berth in the 2020–21 European Rugby Champions Cup
6	Harlequins	22	10	1	11	517	560	−43	63	63	6	3	51	Berth in the 2020–21 European Rugby Champions Cup
7	Gloucester	22	8	0	14	515	513	+2	72	55	9	5	46	Berth in the 2020–21 European Rugby Champions Cup
8	Northampton Saints	22	8	0	14	438	547	−109	52	69	5	5	42	Berth in the 2020–21 European Rugby Champions Cup
9	Worcester Warriors	22	8	0	14	398	578	−180	46	78	4	6	42	2020–21 European Rugby Challenge Cup
10	London Irish	22	6	1	15	386	633	−247	50	88	6	2	34	2020–21 European Rugby Challenge Cup
11	Leicester Tigers	22	6	1	15	374	609	−235	35	79	1	2	29	2020–21 European Rugby Challenge Cup
12	Saracens (Note: As the champion of the Championship (Newcastle Falcons) are eligible for promotion.) (R)	22	13	1	8	583	461	+122	72	55	9	4	−38 (Note: Saracens were deducted 35 points for breaching salary cap regulations in previous seasons; for repeated salary cap breaches during this season, Saracens were deducted a further 70 points and were automatically relegated.)	Relegated

Source: Premiership Rugby
Rules for classification: Tiebreakers for teams tied on points: 1) Number of matches won; 2) Difference between points for and against; 3) Total number of points for; 4) Aggregate number of points scored in matches between tied teams; 5) Number of matches won excluding the first match, then the second and so on until the tie is settled
(C) Champions; (RU) Runners-up; (SF) Losing semi-finalists; (R) Relegated

== Fixtures ==
Fixtures for the season were announced by Premiership Rugby on 10 July 2019. Due to the Rugby World Cup, the first round of matches commenced during the fifth week of the season, following four rounds of the Premiership Cup. The London Double Header does not feature after being discontinued last year.

Highlights of the season included:

- Big Game 12 - Harlequins hosted Leicester Tigers in this season's edition of the Big Game at Twickenham on 28 December 2019.

All fixtures are subject to change.

=== Regular season ===
==== Round 1 ====
18 October 2019
19:45

(1 BP) Bristol Bears	43 – 16	Bath
Try: Morahan (2) 2' m, 80' c Hughes 12' c Protheroe 40+2' m O'Conor 52' c Afoa 66' c Lloyd 78' m Con: Sheedy (3/6) 13', 52', 67'; Lloyd (1/1) 80+2'	Report	Try: Mercer 27' c Con: Priestland (1/1) 28'; Pen: Priestland (3/4) 6', 19', 55'

Ashton Gate
Attendance: 26,399
Referee: Tom Foley

19 October 2019
15:00

Exeter Chiefs	22 – 19	Harlequins (1 BP)
Try: J. Hill 32' c Con: J. Simmonds (1/1) 33'; Pen: J. Simmonds (5/5) 25', 37', 55', 68', 71'	Report	Try: Ibitoye (2) 27' m, 74' m Pen: M. Smith (3/3) 8', 40', 50'

Sandy Park
Attendance: 11,896
Referee: Christophe Ridley

19 October 2019
15:00

(1 BP) Saracens	25 – 27	Northampton Saints
Try: Gallagher 29' c Con: Spencer (1/1) 30'; Pen: Spencer (6/7) 3', 14', 27', 58', 62', 65'	Report	Try: Ribbans 24' c Hutchinson 35' c Taylor 38' c Con: Grayson (3/3) 25', 36', 40'; Pen: Grayson (2/2) 63', 80'

Allianz Park
Attendance: 6,707
Referee: Ian Tempest

19 October 2019
15:00

Worcester Warriors	24 – 16	Leicester Tigers
Try: T. Hill 5' m Humphreys 28' c Con: Weir (1/2) 29'; Pen: Weir (4/4) 39', 63', 75', 80'	Report	Try: T. Youngs 10' c Con: Hardwick (1/1) 11'; Pen: Hardwick (3/5) 3', 35', 48'

Sixways
Attendance: 7,740
Referee: Craig Maxwell-Keys

19 October 2019
15:00

(1 BP) Sale Sharks	16 – 18	Gloucester
Try: McGuigan 17' c Con: R. du Preez (1/1) 18'; Pen: R. du Preez (3/4) 31', 49', 68'	Report	Try: Atkinson 51' c T. Marshall 57' m Con: Twelvetrees (1/2) 53'; Pen: Twelvetrees (2/4) 65', 70'1

AJ Bell Stadium
Attendance: 6,152
Referee: Andrew Jackson

20 October 2019
15:00

(1 BP) Wasps	26 – 29	London Irish
Try: Kibirige (2) 22' m, 36' m Robson 64' c Con: Sopoaga (1/3) 65'; Pen: Sopoaga (2/2) 7', 16'; Umaga (1/1) 73'	Report	Try: Cowan 9' m Tuisue 32' m Hassell-Collins 42' c Con: Jackson (1/3) 44'; Pen: Jackson (4/5) 21', 26', 40'+1, 48'

Ricoh Arena
Attendance: 12,401
Referee: JP Doyle

==== Round 2 ====
25 October 2019
19:45

Bath	13 – 10	Exeter Chiefs (1 BP)
Try: Dunn 40'+1 c Con: Priestland (1/1) 40+2'; Pen: Priestland (2/3) 5', 56'	Report	Try: J. Hill (1/1) 15' c Con: J. Simmonds (1/1) 16'; Pen: J. Simmonds (1/1) 36'

Recreation Ground
Attendance: 14,290
Referee: JP Doyle

26 October 2019
14:00

(1 BP) Northampton Saints	35 – 16	Worcester Warriors
Try: Collins 46' c Naiyaravoro 54' c Furbank (2) 69' m, 76' m Sleightholme 71' m Con: Grayson (2/5) 46', 54'; Pen: Grayson (2/2) 23', 30'	Report	Try: Venter 79' c Con: Lance (1/1) 79'; Pen: Wier (3/5) 5', 11', 26'

Franklin's Gardens
Attendance: 11,412
Referee: Jack Makepeace

26 October 2019
15:00

London Irish	7 – 41	Sale Sharks (1 BP)
Try: Botha 63' c Con: Myler (1/1) 64'	Report	Try: A. van der Merwe 14' c Solomona 33' m Yarde 40' m Beaumont 52' c R. du Preez 61' c Janse van Rensburg 77' c Con: R. du Preez (4/6) 15', 53', 62', 79'; Drop: R. du Preez (1/1) 30'

Madejski Stadium
Attendance: 3,622
Referee: Craig Maxwell-Keys

26 October 2019
15:00

(1 BP) Gloucester	25 – 9	Wasps
Try: T. Marshall (2) 24' m, 72' m Simpson (2) 38' m, 56' c Con: Twelvetrees (1/4) 57'; Pen: Twelvetrees (1/1) 11'	Report	Pen: Sopoaga (3/3) 40+3', 43', 54'

Kingsholm
Attendance: 12,844
Referee: Christophe Ridley

26 October 2019
15:00

Harlequins	22 – 17	Bristol Bears (1 BP)
Try: Marchant 67' c Con: M. Smith (1/1) 68'; Pen: M. Smith (5/5) 13', 36', 40', 44', 58'	Report	Try: Heenan 70' m Pen: Sheedy (4/4) 3', 17', 31', 60'

Twickenham Stoop
Attendance: 13,006
Referee: Ian Tempest

27 October 2019
15:00

Leicester Tigers	10 – 24	Saracens
Try: Thompstone 59' c Con: Reid (1/1) 60'; Pen: Reid (1/1) 8'	Report	Try: Tompkins 18' c Earl (2) 47' c, 76' c Con: Lozowski (2/2) 18', 48'; Man. Vunipola (1/1) 78'; Pen: Lozowski (1/3) 39'

Welford Road
Attendance: 18,533
Referee: Tom Foley

==== Round 3 ====
1 November 2019
19:45

Bristol Bears	16 – 10	Sale Sharks (1 BP)
Try: Lloyd 76' c Con: Sheedy (1/1) 78'; Pen: Sheedy (3/4) 20', 27', 32'	Report	Try: Neild 79' c Con: MacGinty (1/1) 79'; Pen: MacGinty (1/1) 62'

Ashton Gate
Attendance: 14,639
Referee: Christophe Ridley

1 November 2019
19:45

(1 BP) Northampton Saints	40 – 22	Harlequins
Try: Naiyaravoro (2) 6' m, 26' c T. Harrison (2) 10' c, 65' c Haywood 37' m Con: Grayson (3/5) 11', 27', 66'; Pen: Grayson (2/2) 14', 62'; Drop: Grayson (1/1) 59'	Report	Try: Murley (2) 40+4' m, 74' c Robshaw 56' c Con: Herron (2/2) 57', 74'; Pen: M. Smith (1/1) 3 '

Franklin's Gardens
Attendance: 12,791
Referee: JP Doyle

2 November 2019
15:00

Wasps	30 – 22	Bath
Try: Rowlands 40+3' c Shields 65' c Robson 72' c Con: Sopoaga (3/3) 40+4', 67', 73'; Pen: Sopoaga (3/5) 29', 32', 80+5'	Report	Try: Mercer 48' c Con: Priestland (1/1) 48'; Pen: Priestland (5/5) 4', 24', 36', 53', 80'

Ricoh Arena
Attendance: 10,322
Referee: Anthony Woodthorpe

2 November 2019
15:00

Leicester Tigers	16 – 13	Gloucester (1 BP)
Try: Reid 23' c Con: Hardwick (1/1) 24'; Pen: Hardwick (3/3) 3', 67', 80'	Report	Try: Simpson 23' c Con: Twelvetrees (1/1) 50'; Pen: Twelvetrees (2/3) 7', 37'

Welford Road
Attendance: 17,559
Referee: Ian Tempest

2 November 2019
15:00

Saracens	16 – 13	London Irish (1 BP)
Try: Lamositele 26' m Earl 76' m Pen: Lozowski (1/2) 15'; Man. Vunipola (1/2) 80'+1	Report	Try: Tuisue 54' c Con: Myler (1/1) 55'; Pen: Myler (2/2) 9', 31'

Allianz Park
Attendance: 6,293
Referee: Adam Leal

3 November 2019
15:00

(1 BP) Worcester Warriors	20 – 24	Exeter Chiefs
Try: Humphreys (2) 9' c, 27' c Con: Weir (2/2) 10', 29'; Pen: Weir (2/2) 15', 69'	Report	Try: J. Maunder 40' c Kvesic 65' c H. Williams 75' c Con: J Simmonds (3/3) 40+1', 67', 76'; Pen: J Simmonds (1/1) 7'

Sixways
Attendance: 8,598
Referee: Tom Foley

==== Round 4 ====
8 November 2019
19:45

Sale Sharks	28 – 18	Wasps
Try: D. du Preez 17' c Con: R. du Preez (1/1) 18'; Pen: R. du Preez (5/8) 5', 24' 46', 55', 61'; MacGinty (2/2) 74', 79'	Report	Try: Vailanu 7' c Kibirige 51' m Con: Sopoaga (1/2) 8'; Pen: Sopoaga (1/1) 14'; Searle (1/1) 63'

AJ Bell Stadium
Attendance: 5,951
Referee: Tom Foley

9 November 2019
15:00

Bath	22 – 13	Northampton Saints
Try: Chudley 16' c Stuart 50' m Mercer 70' c Con: Priestland (2/3) 17', 71'; Pen: Priestland (1/1) 31'	Report	Try: Hutchinson 1' m Wood 59' m Pen: Grayson (1/2) 8'

Recreation Ground
Attendance: 14,066
Referee: Ian Tempest

9 November 2019
15:00

Gloucester	12 – 21	Saracens
Try: T. Marshall 28' m Ludlow 72' c Con: Twelvetrees (1/1) 73'	Report	Try: Tomkins 24' c Earl 47' m Con: Man. Vunipola (1/2) 25'; Pen: Man. Vunipola (3/4) 17', 37', 40'

Kingsholm
Attendance: 13,454
Referee: Craig Maxwell-Keys

9 November 2019
15:00

(1 BP) Harlequins	14 – 19	Worcester Warriors
Try: Dombrandt 7' c J. Chisholm 12' c Con: M. Smith (2/2) 8', 13'	Report	Try: Shillcock 66' c Con: Lance (1/1) 67'; Pen: Lance (4/5) 4', 32', 40+1', 80'

Twickenham Stoop
Attendance: 13,461
Referee: Matthew Carley

10 November 2019
14:30

(1 BP) London Irish	36 – 11	Leicester Tigers
Try: Hoskins 7' m Loader 19' c Botha 40+1' c Naholo 63' c Parton 77' c Con: Myler (3/4) 20', 40+4', 65'; Phipps (1/1) 78'	Report	Try: Holmes 80' m Pen: Hardwick (2/2) 14', 26'

Madejski Stadium
Attendance: 5,324
Referee: JP Doyle

10 November 2019
15:00

(1 BP) Exeter Chiefs	17 – 20	Bristol Bears
Try: S. Simmonds 14' c White 21' c Con: J. Simmonds (2/2) 15', 22'; Pen: J. Simmonds (1/1) 32'	Report	Try: O'Conor 65' c D. Thomas 80+1' c Con: Sheedy (2/2) 66', 80+5'; Pen: Sheedy (2/2) 43', 59'

Sandy Park
Attendance: 11,015
Referee: Karl Dickson

==== Round 5 ====
29 November 2019
19:45

Bath	12 – 25	Saracens
Pen: Priestland (4/4) 2', 12', 30', 54'	Report	Try: Maitland 32' c Con: Farrell (1/1) 33'; Pen: Farrell (6/6) 9', 16', 37', 45', 57', 62'

Recreation Ground
Attendance: 14,509
Referee: Karl Dickson

30 November 2019
15:00

(1 BP) Exeter Chiefs	38 – 3	Wasps
Try: Moon 2' c Cowan-Dickie 52' c Penalty try 59'; O'Flaherty 66' c Hepburn 75' c Con: Steenson (4/4) 3, 53', 67', 76'; Pen: Steenson (1/1) 19'	Report	Pen: Umaga (1/1) 8'

Sandy Park
Attendance: 13,320
Referee: Ian Tempest

30 November 2019
15:00

(1 BP) Northampton Saints	36 – 13	Leicester Tigers
Try: Proctor (2) 17' c, 27' c Ratuniyarawa 38' c Collins 56' m Dingwall 70' c Con: Grayson (4/5) 17', 29', 39', 71'; Pen: Grayson (1/1) 24'	Report	Try: Thompson 21' c Con: Ford (1/1) 22'; Pen: Ford (2/2) 13', 50'

Franklin's Gardens
Attendance: 15,200
Referee: Matthew Carley

30 November 2019
15:00

Worcester Warriors	20 – 13	Sale Sharks (1 BP)
Try: Humphreys 54' c Beck 57' c Con: Weir (2/2) 55', 58'; Pen: Weir (2/2) 22', 40'	Report	Try: de Klerk 14' m Ashton 36' m Pen: MacGinty (1/1) 68'

Sixways
Attendance: 8,409
Referee: Luke Pearce

1 December 2019
15:00

Harlequins	23 – 19	Gloucester (1 BP)
Try: R. Chisholm 20' c Dombrandt 60' c Con: M. Smith (2/2) 21', 61'; Pen: M. Smith (3/3) 8', 45', 80 +2'	Report	Try: Thorley (2) 13' c, 25' m Morgan 56' c Con: Cipriani (2/3) 13', 57'

Twickenham Stoop
Attendance: 13,528
Referee: Craig Maxwell-Keys

1 December 2019
15:00

(1 BP) Bristol Bears	27 – 27	London Irish
Try: Hughes 44' m C. Piutau 54' c E. Holmes 67' m Thacker 76' c Con: Sheedy (1/2) 54'; Lloyd (1/2) 77'; Pen: Sheedy (1/3) 26'	Report	Try: Meehan 34' c Naholo 62' c Parton 72' c Con: Myler (3/3) 35', 63', 73'; Pen: Myler (2/2) 48', 79'

Ashton Gate
Attendance: 15,033
Referee: Wayne Barnes

==== Round 6 ====
20 December 2019
19:45

(1 BP) Gloucester	36 – 3	Worcester Warriors
Try: Ackermann 59' c C. Harris 63' m Rees-Zammit (2) 67' c, 79' c Morgan 72' c Con: Cipriani (4/5) 59', 68', 72', 80'; Pen: Cipriani (1/2) 40+1'	Report	Pen: Weir (1/2) 7'

Kingsholm
Attendance: 13,787
Referee: Christophe Ridley

21 December 2019
15:00

(1 BP) Wasps	22 – 28	Harlequins (1 BP)
Try: J. Willis 11' c Kibirige 17' c Young 69' m Con: Umaga (2/3) 12, 18'; Pen: Umaga (1/2) 5'	Report	Try: Chisholm 21' c Sinckler 35' c M. Smith 50' c Elia 58' c Con: M. Smith (4/4) 22', 36', 51', 59'

Ricoh Arena
Attendance: 24,842
Referee: Wayne Barnes

21 December 2019
15:00

Sale Sharks	22 – 10	Northampton Saints (1 BP)
Try: Ashton 10' c Janse van Rensburg 44' c van der Merwe 48' m Con: R. du Preez (2/3) 11', 45'; Pen: R. du Preez (1/3) 3'	Report	Try: Ludlam 24' c Con: Biggar (1/1) 25'; Pen: Biggar (1/1) 16'

AJ Bell Stadium
Attendance: 8,120
Referee: JP Doyle

21 December 2019
15:00

Leicester Tigers	22 – 31	Exeter Chiefs (1 BP)
Try: May (2) 7' c, 19' m Taufua 12' c Con: Ford (2/3) 8', 13'; Pen: Ford (1/1) 35'	Report	Try: Kirsten 4' c Armand (2) 27' c, 60' c J. Hill 63' c Con: Steenson (4/4) 5', 28', 62', 65'; Pen: Steenson (1/1) 44'

Welford Road
Attendance: 21,219
Referee: Luke Pearce

21 December 2019
15:00

(1 BP) Saracens	47 – 13	Bristol Bears
Try: Mak. Vunipola 13' m Malins (2) 40' c, 55' c Tompkins (2) 43' c, 69' c Earl 47' c Barritt 63' c Con: Farrell (5/6) 15', 40 +1', 43', 49', 64'; Daly (1/1) 71'	Report	Try: Morahan 9' c Con: Sheedy (1/1) 10'; Pen: Sheedy (2/2) 18', 23'

Allianz Park
Attendance: 8,250
Referee: Tom Foley

22 December 2019
15:00

London Irish	10 – 38	Bath (1 BP)
Try: Coleman 57' c Con: Myler (1/1) 58'; Pen: Myler (1/1) 16'	Report	Try: Obano 4' c A. Watson 7' m Rokoduguni 21' m Penalty try 26'; Chudley 28' c Homer 50' c Con: Priestland (3/5) 5', 29', 51'

Madejski Stadium
Attendance: 9,259
Referee: Karl Dickson

==== Round 7 ====
27 December 2019
19:45

(1 BP) Bristol Bears	21 – 26	Wasps (1 BP)
Try: C. Piutau 53' c Thacker 68' m Con: Sheedy (1/2) 54'; Pen: Sheedy (3/3) 11', 45', 76'	Report	Try: Umaga 42' c Fekitoa 56' c Minozzi 63' m Carr 78' c Con: Umaga (3/4) 43', 58', 80'

Ashton Gate
Attendance: 23,078
Referee: Luke Pearce

28 December 2019
14:00

Northampton Saints	33 – 26	Gloucester (2 BP)
Try: Haywood 31' c Reinach (2) 42' c, 49' c Con: Biggar (1/1) 32'; Francis (2/2) 42', 50'; Pen: Biggar (2/2) 24', 37'; Francis (2/2) 63', 78'	Report	Try: Rees-Zammit (3) 6' c, 54' c, 74' m C. Harris 46' c Con: Cipriani (3/4) 7', 47', 55'

Franklin's Gardens
Attendance: 15,200
Referee: Karl Dickson

28 December 2019
15:00

Bath	16 – 14	Sale Sharks (1 BP)
Try: Joseph 45' c Con: Priestland (1/1) 45'; Pen: Priestland (3/3) 8' 15', 70'	Report	Try: A. van der Merwe 54' c McGuigan 54' c Con: R. du Preez (2/2) 55', 59'

Recreation Ground
Attendance: 14,509
Referee: Craig Maxwell-Keys

28 December 2019
15:00

Worcester Warriors	20 – 6	London Irish
Try: Weir 16' c Lance 58' c Con: Weir (1/1) 17'; Lance (1/1) 59'; Pen: Weir (2/2) 23', 27'	Report	Pen: Myler (2/2) 14', 42'

Sixways
Attendance: 11,499
Referee: Ian Tempest

28 December 2019
16:30

Harlequins	30 – 30	Leicester Tigers
Try: Lasike 28' c M. Smith 48' c Robshaw 54' c Con: M. Smith (3/3) 29', 49', 55'; Pen: M. Smith (3/3) 3', 35', 63'	Report	Try: Eastmond 43' c Taufua 60' c Veainu 72' c Con: Ford (3/3) 44', 61', 73'; Pen: Ford (3/3) 7', 24', 65'

Twickenham Stadium
Attendance: 75,500
Referee: Matthew Carley

29 December 2019
15:00

Exeter Chiefs	14 – 7	Saracens (1 BP)
Try: White 5' c Vermeulen 51' c Con: J. Simmonds (2/2) 6', 52'	Report	Try: Penalty try 78'

Sandy Park
Attendance: 13,593
Referee: Wayne Barnes

==== Round 8 ====
3 January 2020
19:45

(1 BP) Sale Sharks	48 – 10	Harlequins
Try: A. van der Merwe 10' c S. James 20' c L. James 40+1' c Webber 65' c Ashton 71' c Janse van Rensburg 80+1' c Con: R. du Preez (4/4) 11', 22', 40+2', 66'; MacGinty (2/2) 72', 80+1'; Pen: R. du Preez (2/2) 7', 48'	Report	Try: Ibitoye 5' c Con: M. Smith (1/1) 5'; Pen: M. Smith (1/2) 35'

AJ Bell Stadium
Attendance: 8,579
Referee: Ian Tempest

4 January 2020
13:00

(1 BP) Leicester Tigers	31 – 18	Bristol Bears
Try: Genge 2' c May (2) 18' c, 73' c Ford 25' c Con: Ford (4/4) 3', 19', 27', 74'; Pen: Ford (1/2) 53'	Report	Try: D. Thomas 44' c O'Conor 46' m Con: Sheedy (1/2) 45'; Pen: Sheedy (2/2) 6', 15'

Welford Road
Attendance: 19,807
Referee: JP Doyle

4 January 2020
15:00

(1 BP) Gloucester	29 – 15	Bath
Try: Woodward 4' c Clarke 44' m Grobler 57' c Ackermann 61' c Con: Cipriani (1/2) 5'; Twelvetrees (2/2) 58', 63'; Pen: Twelvetrees (1/1) 77'	Report	Pen: Priestland (5/6) 9', 18', 22', 48', 55'

Kingsholm
Attendance: 16,115
Referee: Tom Foley

4 January 2020
15:00

(1 BP) Saracens	62 – 5	Worcester Warriors
Try: Earl 5' c Segun (2) 10' m, 40+1' c Barritt 20' m Mak. Vunipola 28' c Barrington 44' c Itoje 47' c Taylor 58' m Wray 67' m Daly 80' c Con: Farrell (6/10) 6', 30', 40+2', 46', 49', 80+1'	Report	Try: Fidow 55' m

Allianz Park
Attendance: 8,500
Referee: Craig Maxwell-Keys

5 January 2020
14:30

(1 BP) London Irish	28 – 45	Exeter Chiefs (1 BP)
Try: Tuatagaloa 15' c Tuisue 46' c Hassell-Collins 51' c Mafi 62' c Con: Myler (4/4) 17', 48', 53', 64'	Report	Try: S. Hill (2) 6' c, 41' c Dennis 32' c Cowan-Dickie 36' c Devoto 39' c Townsend 54' c Con: Steenson (6/6) 7', 33', 37, 40', 42', 55'; Pen: Steenson (1/1) 66'

Madejski Stadium
Attendance: 6,412
Referee: Christophe Ridley

5 January 2020
15:00

(2 BP) Wasps	31 – 35	Northampton Saints (1 BP)
Try: M. Watson 27' c Gopperth 54' c Minozzi 59' c Penalty try 69'; Con: Umaga (3/3) 29', 55', 60'; Pen: Umaga (1/1) 22'	Report	Try: Reinach (2) 15' c, 50' c Wood 34' c T. Harrison 41' c Naiyaravoro 76' c Con: Biggar (5/5) 16', 34', 41', 52', 77'

Ricoh Arena
Attendance: 12,715
Referee: Matthew Carley

==== Round 9 ====
24 January 2020
19:45

(1 BP) Northampton Saints	16 – 20	London Irish
Try: Reinach 32' c Con: Grayson (1/1) 33'; Pen: Grayson (3/5) 23', 39', 63'	Report	Try: Hassell-Collins 16' m F. van der Merwe 72' c Porecki 78' m Con: Myler (1/3) 74'; Pen: Myler (1/1) 27'

Franklin's Gardens
Attendance: 13,793
Referee: Tom Foley

25 January 2020
15:00

Bath	13 – 10	Leicester Tigers (1 BP)
Try: Homer (2) 3' m, 69' m Pen: Priestland (1/1) 46'	Report	Try: B. White 59' c Con: Hardwick (1/1) 60'; Pen: Hardwick (1/2) 23'

Recreation Ground
Attendance: 14,029
Referee: Wayne Barnes

25 January 2020
15:00

Bristol Bears	34 – 16	Gloucester
Try: Purdy 44' c Morahan 68' m Protheroe 72' c Con: Sheedy (2/3) 46', 73'; Pen: Sheedy (5/5) 13', 19', 27', 35', 38'	Report	Try: Clarke 77' c Con: Twelvetrees (1/1) 77'; Pen: O. Williams (3/3) 15', 22', 30

Ashton Gate
Attendance: 18,779
Referee: Karl Dickson

25 January 2020
15:00

(1 BP) Exeter Chiefs	19 – 22	Sale Sharks
Try: Dollman 29' m O'Flaherty 67' c S. Skinner 74' c Con: Steenson (2/3) 68', 74'	Report	Try: Ashton 17' m D. du Preez 36' c McGuigan 38' c Con: R. du Preez (2/3) 37', 39'; Pen: R. du Preez (1/2) 7'

Sandy Park
Attendance: 11,965
Referee: JP Doyle

25 January 2020
15:00

(1 BP) Worcester Warriors	26 – 30	Wasps (1 BP)
Try: Mama 40+8' c Lawrence 67' c Con: Weir (2/2) 40+9', 67'; Pen: Weir (4/4) 12', 32', 52', 62'		Try: Gopperth 17' m Kibirige 57' m J. Willis 64' c Robson 71' c Con: Searle (2/4) 65', 72'; Pen: Searle (2/2) 45', 49'

Sixways
Attendance: 8,848
Referee: Craig Maxwell-Keys

26 January 2020
15:00

(1 BP) Harlequins	41 – 14	Saracens
Try: Care 1' c Murley (2) 10' m, 21' c Ibitoye 43' m Lasike 47' c Landajo 75' c Con: M. Smith (4/6) 2', 23', 48', 76'; Pen: M. Smith (1/1) 58'	Report	Try: Lozowski 28' c D. Morris 54' c Con: Man. Vunipola (2/2) 29', 55'

Twickenham Stoop
Attendance: 14,258
Referee: Luke Pearce

==== Round 10 ====
14 February 2020
19:45

Gloucester	15 – 26	Exeter Chiefs
Try: Polledri 68' c Rees-Zammit 75' m Con: Twelvetrees (1/2) 69'; Pen: Twelvetrees (1/1) 24'	Report	Try: Vermeulen 9' c Hogg 62' c Con: Steenson (2/2) 10', 63'; Pen: Steenson (4/4) 47', 52', 55', 59'

Kingsholm
Attendance: 13,497
Referee: Craig Maxwell-Keys

15 February 2020
15:00

Harlequins	15 – 29	London Irish (1 BP)
Try: Dombrandt 50' c Murley 74' m Con: M. Smith (1/2) 51'; Pen: M. Smith (1/1) 13'	Report	Try: Rogerson 6' c Rona (2) 17' c, 60' c Hoskins 78' m Con: Myler (3/4) 8, 18' 62'; Pen: Myler (1/1) 36'

Twickenham Stoop
Attendance: 14,332
Referee: JP Doyle

15 February 2020
15:00

Leicester Tigers	18 – 9	Wasps
Try: Bateman 54' c Veainu 64' m Con: Reid (1/2) 55'; Pen: Hardwick (1/2) 27'; Reid (1/1) 49'	Report	Pen: Gopperth (3/3) 8', 14', 43'

Welford Road
Attendance: 23,353
Referee: Karl Dickson

15 February 2020
15:00

(1 BP) Saracens	36 – 22	Sale Sharks
Try: Carré 0' m Segun 43' c Isiekwe 54' m Barrington 66' c Con: Man. Vunipola (2/4) 44', 67'; Pen: Man. Vunipola (3/3) 11', 34', 45'; Lozowski (1/1) 16'	Report	Try: McGuigan 40' c D. du Preez 70' c R. du Preez 78' m Con: R. du Preez (2/3) 40+1', 71'; Pen: R. du Preez (1/1) 6'

Allianz Park
Attendance: 7,500
Referee: Wayne Barnes

15 February 2020
15:00

(1 BP) Worcester Warriors	21 – 22	Bath
Try: C. du Preez 12' c David 67' m Con: Weir (1/2) 13'; Pen: Weir (3/7) 7', 21', 61'	Report	Try: Mercer 1' c Louw 44' c McNally 56' m Con: Priestland (2/3) 2', 45'; Pen: Priestland (1/1) 9'

Sixways
Attendance: 8,064
Referee: Christophe Ridley

16 February 2020
15:00

(1 BP) Northampton Saints	14 – 20	Bristol Bears
Try: Mallinder 7' m Pen: Grayson (3/3) 17', 28', 42'	Report	Try: Purdy 60' c Thiede 62' c Con: Sheedy (2/2) 61', 64'; Pen: Sheedy (1/1) 49'; Madigan (1/1) 80+1'

Franklin's Gardens
Attendance: 12,666
Referee: Tom Foley

==== Round 11 ====
21 February 2020
19:45

(1 BP) Sale Sharks	36 – 3	Leicester Tigers
Try: B. Evans 28' m Yarde (3) 32' c, 67' c, 71' c Oosthuizen 38' c Con: R. du Preez (4/5) 33', 39', 68', 72'; Pen: R. du Preez (1/1) 53'	Report	Pen: Reid (1/2) 3'

AJ Bell Stadium
Attendance: 7,208
Referee: Ian Tempest

21 February 2020
19:45

(1 BP) Wasps	60 – 10	Saracens
Try: J. Willis 12' c Carr 19' c Kibirige (2) 24' c, 30' c Shields (2) 45' c, 56' c Umaga 49' c Oghre 75' m Con: Gopperth (7/8) 13', 20', 26', 32', 46', 50', 58'; Pen: Gopperth (2/2) 3', 43'	Report	Try: Crossdale 39' m Lewington 63' m

Ricoh Arena
Attendance: 11,632
Referee: Christophe Ridley

22 February 2020
15:00

Bath	19 – 12	Harlequins (1 BP)
Try: McConnochie (2) 11' m, 65' m Pen: Priestland (1/3) 19'; Burns (2/2) 57', 75'	Report	Try: Dombrandt 27' m M. Smith 53' c Con: M. Smith (1/2) 54'

Recreation Ground
Attendance: 14,368
Referee: Tom Foley

22 February 2020
15:00

(1 BP) London Irish	24 – 20	Gloucester (1 BP)
Try: Hassell-Collins (4) 12' m, 17' m, 42' c, 58' c Con: Myler (2/4) 43', 60'	Report	Try: Chapman 49' c Thorley 56' m Rees-Zammit 70' m Con: Twelvetrees (1/3) 50'; Pen: Twelvetrees (1/2) 9'

Madejski Stadium
Attendance: 4,932
Referee: Luke Pearce

23 February 2020
13:00

Bristol Bears	13 – 10	Worcester Warriors (1 BP)
Try: Morahan 35' c Con: Sheedy (1/1) 36'; Pen: Sheedy (2/3) 21', 69'	Report	Try: David 41' c Con: Weir (1/1) 42'; Pen: van Breda (1/1) 67'

Ashton Gate
Attendance: 12,867
Referee: JP Doyle

23 February 2020
13:00

(1 BP) Exeter Chiefs	57 – 7	Northampton Saints
Try: J. Hill 31' m Taione 36' c Kirsten 40+1' c Hendrickson (2) 47' c, 58' c Moon 53' c O'Flaherty 70' c S. Simmonds 77' c Con: J. Simmonds (5/6) 36', 40+2', 48', 53', 59'; Steenson (2/2) 71', 78'; Pen: J. Simmonds (1/2) 10'	Report	Try: Grayson 68' c Con: Grayson (1/1) 69'

Sandy Park
Attendance: 11,528
Referee: Jack Makepeace

==== Round 12 ====
28 February 2020
19:45

(1 BP) Gloucester	17 – 23	Sale Sharks
Try: Balmain 56' c Twelvetrees 63' c Con: Twelvetrees (2/2) 57', 64'; Pen: Twelvetrees (1/2) 49'	Report	Try: L. James 35' c B. Evans 45' m Yarde 59' m Con: R. du Preez (1/3) 35'; Pen: R. du Preez (2/3) 26', 72'

Kingsholm
Attendance: 13,370
Referee: Wayne Barnes

29 February 2020
15:00

Harlequins	34 – 30	Exeter Chiefs (1 BP)
Try: Lasike 19' c Cavubati 43' c M. Smith 60' c Penalty try 80+6'; Con: M. Smith (3/3) 20', 44', 61'; Pen: M. Smith (2/2) 6', 26'	Report	Try: Dollman 2' c J. Simmonds (2) 49' c, 52' c Con: J. Simmonds (3/3) 3', 50', 53'; Pen: J. Simmonds (3/3) 9', 32', 64'

Twickenham Stoop
Attendance: 14,800
Referee: Christophe Ridley

29 February 2020
15:00

Leicester Tigers	14 – 8	Worcester Warriors (1 BP)
Try: J. Olowofela 32' m Pen: McPhillips (3/3) 22', 62', 79'	Report	Try: Humphreys 10' m Pen: Weir (1/1) 39'

Welford Road
Attendance: 18,268
Referee: Adam Leal

29 February 2020
15:00

(1 BP) Northampton Saints	21 – 27	Saracens (1 BP)
Try: Dingwall 2' m Mallinder 5' c Con: Biggar (1/2) 6'; Pen: Mallinder (3/3) 24', 54', 72'	Report	Try: Segun 8' m Singleton 45' c Tompkins 48' c Earl 57' m Con: Man. Vunipola (2/4) 46', 49'; Pen: Man. Vunipola (1/1) 15'

Franklin's Gardens
Attendance: 14,978
Referee: Matthew Carley

1 March 2020
14:30

(1 BP) London Irish	26 – 36	Wasps (1 BP)
Try: Meehan 5' c Loader 30' c Rogerson 53' m Matu'u 80+6' c Con: Myler (3/4) 6', 31', 80+7'	Report	Try: Alo 40+1' c Harris 46' c M. Watson 62' m Robson 66' c Umaga 74' c Con: Gopperth (4/5) 40+2', 46', 67', 74'; Pen: Gopperth (1/1) 9'

Madejski Stadium
Attendance: 5,447
Referee: Tom Foley

1 March 2020
15:00

(1 BP) Bath	13 – 19	Bristol Bears
Try: Chudley 65' c Con: Priestland (1/1) 65'; Pen: Priestland (2/2) 8', 38'	Report	Try: Vui 4' m Leiua 16' c Randall 62' c Con: Sheedy (2/3) 18', 63'

Recreation Ground
Attendance: 13,976
Referee: Ian Tempest

==== Round 13 ====
6 March 2020
19:45

(1 BP) Worcester Warriors	10 – 16	Northampton Saints
Try: Lawrence 65' c Con: Lance (1/1) 66'; Pen: Lance (1/1) 16'	Report	Try: Haywood 32' c Con: Grayson (1/1) 33'; Pen: Grayson (3/4) 9', 37', 77'

Sixways
Attendance: 7,297
Referee: Andrew Jackson

6 March 2020
20:00

(1 BP) Sale Sharks	39 – 0	London Irish
Try: S. James (2) 17' c, 68' c L. James 40+1' m Webber 62' c Solomona 73' m McGuigan 80' m Con: R. du Preez (3/4) 18', 63', 69'; Pen: R. du Preez (1/1) 48'	Report

AJ Bell Stadium
Attendance: 7,041
Referee: Anthony Woodthorpe

7 March 2020
13:00

Saracens	24 – 13	Leicester Tigers
Try: Lewington (2) 16' c, 69' c Morris 59' c Con: Man. Vunipola (3/3) 17', 60', 70'; Pen: Man. Vunipola (1/1) 57'	Report	Try: B. White 52' c Con: Hardwick (1/1) 53'; Pen: Hardwick (2/2) 24', 35'

Allianz Park
Attendance: 6,564 (Note: Premiership Rugby gave an attendance of 5,500 for the Saracens v Leicester Tigers game on 7 March, compared to 6,564 in The Rugby Paper. Until a more accurate figure can be produced by Premiership Rugby, The Rugby Paper version will be used.)
Referee: J P Doyle

7 March 2020
14:30

(1 BP) Exeter Chiefs	57 – 20	Bath
Try: O'Flaherty 5' m Woodburn (2) 13' c, 70' c S. Simmonds (2) 28' c, 41' c Kirsten 33' c Taione 50' c J. Maunder 75' c Con: J. Simmonds (5/6) 13', 30', 34', 41', 51'; Steenson (2/2) 71', 76'; Pen: J. Simmonds (1/1) 18'	Report	Try: Mercer 47' m Wright 54' c McConnochie 63' m Con: Burns (1/2) 54'; Pen: Priestland (1/1) 9'

Sandy Park
Attendance: 13,571
Referee: Luke Pearce

7 March 2020
14:30

(1 BP) Wasps	39 – 22	Gloucester (1 BP)
Try: J. Willis 4' c Bassett 24' m Umaga 27' c Carr 40' c Fekitoa 51' c Con: Gopperth (4/5) 5', 29', 40+1', 52'; Pen: Gopperth (1/1) 62'; Drop: Robson (1/1) 14'	Report	Try: Marshall 33' m Thorley 37' m Twelvetrees 47' c Evans 57' m Con: Twelvetrees (1/4) 48'

Ricoh Arena
Attendance: 9,503
Referee: Ian Tempest

8 March 2020
13:00

Bristol Bears	28 – 15	Harlequins
Try: Morahan (2) 1' c, 20' m Vui 34' c Con: Sheedy (2/3) 2', 35'; Pen: Sheedy (3/3) 11', 28', 49'	Report	Try: Morris 17' m Ibitoye 73' c Con: M. Smith (1/1) 73'; Pen: Herron (1/2) 6'

Ashton Gate
Attendance: 14,618
Referee: Craig Maxwell-Keys

Following round 13, the league was suspended until 14 August due to the COVID-19 pandemic in England.

==== Round 14 ====
14 August 2020
19:45

Harlequins	16 – 10	Sale Sharks (1 BP)
Try: Baldwin 57' c Con: M. Smith (1/1) 58'; Pen: M. Smith (3/3) 15', 20', 32'	Report	Try: McGuigan 44' c Con: R. du Preez (1/1) 46'; Pen: MacGinty (1/1) 71'

Twickenham Stoop
Attendance: 0
Referee: Luke Pearce

15 August 2020
12:30

Worcester Warriors	15 – 44	Gloucester (1 BP)
Try: Hill 2' m van Breda 72' c Con: Weir (1/1) 73'; Pen: Searle (1/2) 25'	Report	Try: Singleton 29' m Thorley (2) 37' c, 49' c Rees-Zammit 55' m Woodward 62' c Varney 78' c Con: Twelvetrees (4/6) 38', 50', 63', 79'; Pen: Twelvetrees (2/2) 19', 75'

Sixways
Attendance: 0
Referee: Cristophe Ridley

15 August 2020
14:00

(1 BP) Exeter Chiefs	26 – 13	Leicester Tigers
Try: Ewers 27' m Hogg 39' c Cowan-Dickie 42' c Penalty try 53'; Con: J. Simmonds (2/3) 40+1', 43'	Report	Try: Penalty try 57'; Pen: Ford (1/1) 11'; Drop: Ford (1/1) 17'

Sandy Park
Attendance: 0
Referee: Tom Foley

15 August 2020
15:00

(1 BP) Bath	34 – 17	London Irish
Try: Spencer 5' m Dunn (2) 16' c, 22' m Joseph 62' c Walker 69' c Con: Priestland (3/5) 17', 63', 70'; Pen: Priestland (1/1) 58'	Report	Try: Rona 38' c Cornish 77' c Con: Jackson (2/2) 39', 77'; Pen: Jackson (1/1) 53'

Recreation Ground
Attendance: 0
Referee: Craig Maxwell-Keys

15 August 2020
16:30

Bristol Bears	16 – 12	Saracens (1 BP)
Try: Penalty try 77'; Pen: Sheedy (3/3) 22', 26', 50'	Report	Pen: Goode (4/5) 8', 11', 46', 65'

Ashton Gate
Attendance: 0
Referee: Matthew Carley

16 August 2020
15:00

Northampton Saints	21 – 34	Wasps (1 BP)
Try: Mitchell 45' c Ribbans 63' m Con: Biggar (1/2) 46'; Pen: Biggar (3/3) 5', 12', 69'	Report	Try: Bassett (2) 8' c, 77' c J. Willis 17' c Harris 48' c Con: Gopperth (3/3) 9', 19', 49'; Sopoaga (1/1) 78'; Pen: Sopoaga (2/2) 60', 74'

Franklin's Gardens
Attendance: 0
Referee: Karl Dickson

==== Round 15 ====
21 August 2020
18:00

Sale Sharks	22 – 32	Exeter Chiefs (1 BP)
Try: T. Curry 7' c du Preez 10' c Solomona 78' m Con: R. du Preez (2/3) 8', 11'; Pen: R. du Preez (1/1) 44'	Report	Try: S. Simmonds 2' c Vermeulen 48' c Hogg 53' m Cowan-Dickie 60' c Con: J. Simmonds (3/4) 4', 49', 62'; Pen: J. Simmonds (2/2) 39', 58'

AJ Bell Stadium
Attendance: 0
Referee: Matthew Carley

21 August 2020
19:45

Gloucester	24 – 33	Bristol Bears (1 BP)
Try: Balmain 25' c C. Harris 31' c Varney 71' c Con: Twelvetrees (2/2) 26', 32'; Cipriani (1/1) 71'; Pen: Twelvetrees (1/1) 43'	Report	Try: Malins 5' m Purdy 9' c Thacker 17' c Radradra 29' c Earl 51' c Con: Sheedy (4/5) 10', 18', 29', 51'

Kingsholm
Attendance: 0
Referee: Luke Pearce

21 August 2020
19:45

(1 BP) Wasps	32 – 17	Worcester Warriors
Try: T. Willis 29' c Oghre 60' m Barbeary 74' c Cruse 80' c Con: Miller (3/4) 29', 75', 80'+1; Pen: Miller (2/3) 15', 39'	Report	Try: David 13' c Cutting 19' c Con: Weir (2/2) 14', 20'; Pen: Weir (1/1) 33'

Ricoh Arena
Attendance: 0
Referee: Craig Maxwell-Keys

22 August 2020
12:30

(1 BP) Saracens	38 – 24	Harlequins
Try: Maitland 3' m Itoje 33' c Davies 40' c Lewington 76' c Con: Farrell (3/4) 34', 40', 77'; Pen: Farrell (4/4) 14', 45', 57', 64'	Report	Try: Lasike (2) 60' c, 75' c Steele 69' c Con: M. Smith (3/3) 60', 70', 75'; Drop: M. Smith (1/1) 31'

Allianz Park
Attendance: 0
Referee: Christophe Ridley

22 August 2020
14:00

London Irish	3 – 27	Northampton Saints (1 BP)
Pen: Jackson (1/1) 40'	Report	Try: Collins 50' m Penalty try (2) 58', 67'; Tuala 79' m Con: Grayson (2/4) 59', 68'; Pen: Grayson (1/1) 16'

Twickenham Stoop
Attendance: 0
Referee: Ian Tempest

22 August 2020
16:30

Leicester Tigers	16 – 38	Bath (1 BP)
Try: Clare 67' m Wallace 80' m Con: McPhillips (0/2); Pen: McPhillips (2/2) 1', 6'		Try: Stuart 17' c Dunn 24' c McConnochie 30' m Boyce 36' c Obano 48' m de Glanville 52' c Con: Priestland (3/5) 18', 26', 37'; B. Spencer (1/1) 53'

Welford Road
Attendance: 0
Referee: Karl Dickson

==== Round 16 ====
25 August 2020
17:30

Wasps	11 – 20	Sale Sharks
Try: J. Willis 79' m Pen: Gopperth (2/2) 32', 38'	Report	Try: L. James 61' m Pen: MacGinty (5/5) 8', 36', 40'+3, 48', 56'

Ricoh Arena
Attendance: 0
Referee: Matthew Carley

25 August 2020
19:45

(1 BP) Bristol Bears	22 – 25	Exeter Chiefs
Try: O'Conor 49' c Morahan 52' c Lloyd 70' m Con: Sheedy (2/3) 50', 53'; Pen: Sheedy (1/2) 70'	Report	Try: Dollman 14' c Hidalgo-Clyne 23' m Keast 77' c Con: Steenson (2/3) 15', 78'; Pen: Steenson (2/2) 35', 65'

Ashton Gate
Attendance: 0
Referee: Wayne Barnes

26 August 2020
18:00

Leicester Tigers	13 – 7	London Irish (1 BP)
Try: Williams 25' c Con: Ford (1/1) 26'; Pen: Ford (2/2) 8', 46'	Report	Try: Meehan 61' c Con: Jackson (1/1) 62'

Welford Road
Attendance: 0
Referee: Ian Tempest

26 August 2020
18:00

(1 BP) Saracens	36 – 20	Gloucester
Try: B. Harris 38' m Woolstencroft (3) 46' c, 49' m, 65' m Whiteley 73' m Con: Man. Vunipola (1/5) 47'; Pen: Daly (2/2) 7', 15'; Man. Vunipola (1/1) 17'	Report	Try: Varney 34' c Walker 62' m Rees-Zammit 80'+1 m Con: L. Evans (1/3) 36'; Pen: L. Evans (1/2) 5'

Allianz Park
Attendance: 0
Referee: Jack Makepeace

26 August 2020
18:00

(1 BP) Worcester Warriors	29 – 14	Harlequins
Try: du Preez 5' c Lawrence 12' m Annett 28' c Hougaard 39' c Con: Weir (3/4) 6', 29', 40'; Pen: Weir (1/2) 47'	Report	Try: Ashton 61' c Elia 73' c Con: Lang (2/2) 62', 73'

Sixways
Attendance: 0
Referee: Luke Pearce

26 August 2020
19:45

Northampton Saints	3 – 18	Bath
Pen: Biggar (1/2) 33'	Report	Try: de Glanville 58' m McConnochie 67' c Con: Priestland (1/1) 68'; Pen: Matavesi (1/1) 21'; Priestland (1/1) 75'

Franklin's Gardens
Attendance: 0
Referee: Christophe Ridley

==== Round 17 ====
29 August 2020
15:00

(1 BP) Sale Sharks	40 – 7	Bristol Bears
Try: L. James (2) 7' c, 50' c Solomona 10' c de Klerk 17' c S. James 32' m Yarde 54' c Con: MacGinty (5/6) 8', 11', 19', 51', 55'	Report	Try: Leiua 37' c Con: Eden (1/1) 38'

AJ Bell Stadium
Attendance: 0
Referee: Karl Dickson

30 August 2020
14:00

(1 BP) Harlequins	30 – 17	Northampton Saints
Try: Earle 24' c Baldwin 37' m Robshaw 47' m Ashton 50' c Con: M. Smith (2/4) 26', 51'; Pen: M. Smith (2/3) 15', 40'+1	Report	Try: Hutchinson 5' c R. Olowofela 31' c Con: Grayson (2/2) 6', 31'; Pen: Grayson (1/1) 58'

Twickenham Stoop
Attendance: 0
Referee: Craig Maxwell-Keys

30 August 2020
15:00

(1 BP) Exeter Chiefs	59 – 7	Worcester Warriors
Try: S. Simmonds (3) 8' c, 26' c, 63' c J. Hill (3) 11' c, 36' m, 40'+1 c Nowell 30' m Hogg 42' c Vermeulen 56' c Con: J. Simmonds (7/9) 8', 12', 27', 40'+1, 42', 57', 64'	Report	Try: Beck 70' c Con: Searle (1/1) 71'

Sandy Park
Attendance: 0
Referee: Adam Leal

30 August 2020
16:30

(1 BP) Gloucester	46 – 30	Leicester Tigers
Try: Simpson 6' c Thorley (4) 9' m, 22' c, 26' c, 30' m C. Harris 33' m L. Evans 74' c Con: Twelvetrees (4/7) 7', 23', 27', 75'; Pen: Twelvetrees (1/1) 72'	Report	Try: Potter 36' c Taufua 55' c Henderson 60' c Con: Ford (3/3) 37', 56', 61'; Pen: Henry (2/2) 4', 18'; Ford (1/1) 65'

Kingsholm
Attendance: 0
Referee: Matthew Carley

31 August 2020
13:00

London Irish	12 – 40	Saracens (1 BP)
Try: Creevy 20' m Williams 29' c Con: Atkins (1/2) 30'	Report	Try: George (2) 10' c, 34' m Barritt 14' c B. Vunipola 25' c Barrington (2) 51' c, 54' c Con: Man. Vunipola (5/6) 11', 16', 27', 52', 55'

Twickenham Stoop
Attendance: 0
Referee: Tom Foley

31 August 2020
15:00

(1 BP) Bath	23 – 27	Wasps
Try: McConnochie 2' c Walker 67' c Con: Priestland (2/2) 4', 69'; Pen: Priestland (3/4) 7', 11', 49'	Report	Try: Umaga 27' c West 57' c Penalty try 75'; Con: Umaga (2/2) 28', 58'; Pen: Sopoaga (1/1) 13'; Umaga (1/2) 40'

Recreation Ground
Attendance: 0
Referee: Wayne Barnes

==== Round 18 ====
4 September 2020
18:00

Worcester Warriors	13 – 36	Bristol Bears (1 BP)
Try: Nanai 28' c Con: Weir (1/1) 30'; Pen: Weir (2/3) 25', 34'	Report	Try: Holmes 7' c D. Thomas 45' m S. Piutau 50' c Uren 67' c Earl 74' c Con: Sheedy (4/5) 8', 51', 68', 75'; Pen: Sheedy (1/1) 40'

Sixways
Attendance: 0
Referee: Wayne Barnes

4 September 2020
19:45

(1 BP) Northampton Saints	19 – 22	Exeter Chiefs
Try: Ribbans (2) 29' c, 42' c H. Taylor 38' m Con: Biggar (2/3) 30', 43'	Report	Try: Lonsdale 8' c Kirsten 12' c O'Flaherty 71' m Con: Steenson (2/3) 9', 12'; Pen: Steenson (1/1) 56'

Franklin's Gardens
Attendance: 0
Referee: Luke Pearce

5 September 2020
12:30

Saracens	18 – 28	Wasps
Try: Daly 3' c Maitland 51' m Con: Farrell (1/2) 5'; Pen: Farrell (1/1) 44'; Goode (1/1) 65'	Report	Try: T. Willis 71' c Con: Gopperth (1/1) 72'; Pen: Gopperth (7/7) 14', 23', 32', 40+1', 56', 61', 78'

Allianz Park
Attendance: 0
Referee: Christophe Ridley

5 September 2020
14:00

Harlequins	27 – 41	Bath (1 BP)
Try: Marchant 6' c Landajo 70' c Lang 80+1' c Con: Herron (3/3) 7', 70', 80+1'; Pen: Herron (2/3) 13', 18'	Report	Try: McConnochie (2) 19' c, 43' m Stooke 24' c Boyce 71' c Con: Priestland (3/4) 20', 25', 72'; Pen: Priestland (5/5) 9', 16', 36', 57', 64'

Twickenham Stoop
Attendance: 3,500 (Note: Spectators were admitted to the match in limited capacity and socially distanced as part of a government trial)
Referee: Tom Foley

5 September 2020
15:00

Leicester Tigers	31 – 40	Sale Sharks (1 BP)
Try: Liebenberg 52' c Kerr 70' c Steward 78' m Con: Ford (2/3) 52', 71'; Pen: Ford (4/4) 12', 20', 29', 55'	Report	Try: MacGinty 17' c Tuilagi 26' c Ross 45' c Solomona 63' c Con: MacGinty (4/4) 19', 27', 47', 65'; Pen: MacGinty (2/3) 34', 80+1' de Klerk (1/1) 58'; Drop: de Klerk (1/1) 8'

Welford Road
Attendance: 0
Referee: Ian Tempest

5 September 2020
16:30

(1 BP) Gloucester	36 – 23	London Irish
Try: L. Evans 9' c Thorley 33' c Rees-Zammit 58' m Stanley 65' c Varney 77' c Con: L. Evans (2/2) 10', 34'; Twelvetrees (2/3) 66', 78'; Pen: L. Evans (1/1) 20'	Report	Try: Hassell-Collins 38' c Creevy 52' c Con: Jackson (2/2) 39', 53'; Pen: Jackson (3/3) 4', 13', 68'

Kingsholm
Attendance: 0
Referee: Hamish Smales

==== Round 19 ====
8 September 2020
19:45

(1 BP) Bristol Bears	47 – 10	Northampton Saints
Try: Thacker 10' c Leiua 15' c Uren 18' c Vui 62' c Earl 65' c O'Conor 67' c Morahan 71' m Con: Sheedy (6/7) 11', 15', 19', 63', 66', 68'	Report	Try: Gillespie 57' c Con: Grayson (1/1) 58'; Pen: Grayson (1/1) 4'

Ashton Gate
Attendance: 0
Referee: Tom Foley

9 September 2020
17:30

(1 BP) Wasps	54 – 7	Leicester Tigers
Try: Fekitoa 25' c West 32' c Barbeary (3) 46' m, 52' c, 62' c Umaga 56' c Spink 70' c Kibirige 73' c Con: Umaga (5/6) 25', 33', 52', 56', 63'; Gopperth (2/2) 71', 74'	Report	Try: Henderson 5' c Con: Henry (1/1) 6'

Ricoh Arena
Attendance: 0
Referee: Karl Dickson

9 September 2020
17:30

(1 BP) Exeter Chiefs	35 – 22	Gloucester
Try: Cowan-Dickie 3' c S. Simmonds 29' c J. Hill 40+1' c Whitten 42' c J. Maunder 54' c Con: J. Simmonds (5/5) 4', 30', 40+1', 43', 56'	Report	Try: Banahan (2) 8' m, 62' c Gray 75' c Con: Twelvetrees (2/3) 64', 76'; Pen: Twelvetrees (1/1) 23'

Sandy Park
Attendance: 0
Referee: Christophe Ridley

9 September 2020
18:00

Sale Sharks	24 – 17	Saracens (1 BP)
Try: Postlethwaite 3' c Morozov 16' c Hammersley 27' c Con: R. du Preez (3/3) 4', 17', 28'; Pen: R. du Preez (1/2) 76'	Report	Try: Segun (2) 4' c, 80+1' c Con: Man. Vunipola (2/2) 6', 80+1'; Pen: Man. Vunipola (1/1) 60'

AJ Bell Stadium
Attendance: 0
Referee: Craig Maxwell-Keys

9 September 2020
19:45

(1 BP) Bath	40 – 15	Worcester Warriors
Try: Ellis 9' c Stooke (2) 19' c, 49' c Walker 32' m de Glanville 38' c Matavesi 52' c Con: Matavesi (5/6) 10', 20', 39', 50', 53'	Report	Try: Searle 7' c Fidow 20' m Con: Searle (1/2) 7'; Pen: Searle (1/1) 40+1'

Recreation Ground
Attendance: 0
Referee: Andrew Jackson

9 September 2020
19:45

London Irish	15 – 38	Harlequins (1 BP)
Try: Norton 15' c Donnell 24' m Con: J. Atkins (1/2) 16'; Pen: J. Atkins (1/1) 36'	Report	Try: M. Smith (2) 7' m, 49' c Baldwin 26' m Steele 65' c Penalty try 77'; Murley 80' c Con: M. Smith (3/5) 49', 66', 80+1'

Twickenham Stoop
Attendance: 0
Referee: Matthew Carley

==== Round 20 ====
13 September 2020
12:30

(1 BP) Wasps	59 – 35	Bristol Bears (1 BP)
Try: J. Willis 1' m Bassett 6' c Cruse 11' c Rowlands 17' c Kibirige 40+1' m Robson 47' c Penalty try 53'; T. Willis 68' c Oghre 78' c Con: Gopperth (6/8) 6', 12', 18', 48', 70', 79'	Report	Try: Malins (2) 33' c, 60' c O'Conor 36' c Penalty try 74'; McCabe 80+1' c Con: Malins (4/4) 33', 37', 60', 80+1'

Ricoh Arena
Attendance: 0
Referee: Ian Tempest

13 September 2020
14:00

Leicester Tigers	28 – 24	Northampton Saints (1 BP)
Try: B. Youngs 6' c Con: Henry (1/1) 7'; Pen: Henry (5/7) 14', 19', 24', 45', 77'; Steward (1/1) 40'; Drop: Henry (1/1) 69'	Report	Try: Penalty try 29'; Hill 64' c Taylor 80+1' c Con: Biggar (2/2) 65', 80+2'; Pen: Biggar (1/1) 4'

Welford Road
Attendance: 0
Referee: Wayne Barnes

13 September 2020
15:00

(1 BP) London Irish	25 – 40	Worcester Warriors (1 BP)
Try: Loader 4' m Tuisue 62' c Meehan 73' m Homer 79' m Con: Jackson (1/4) 63'; Pen: Jackson (1/1) 40+1'	Report	Try: Hougaard (2) 25' c, 42' c Nanai Vai 48' c Lawrence (2) 58' c, 69' c Howe 80+1' m Con: Weir (5/5) 26', 43', 50', 59', 70'

Twickenham Stoop
Attendance: 0
Referee: Craig Maxwell-Keys

13 September 2020
15:00

Sale Sharks	22 – 37	Bath (1 BP)
Try: Janse van Rensburg 4' c J. du Preez 52' c D. du Preez 72' m Con: MacGinty (2/3) 5', 72'; Pen: MacGinty (1/2) 58'	Report	Try: McConnochie 21' c Spencer (2) 31' c, 69' c Joseph 78' c Con: Priestland (4/4) 22', 31', 70', 79'; Pen: Priestland (3/3) 24', 61', 63'

AJ Bell Stadium
Attendance: 0
Referee: Matthew Carley

13 September 2020
16:30

(1 BP) Saracens	40 – 17	Exeter Chiefs
Try: Segun 5' m Morris 40' c Obatoyinbo 54' m Venter 62' c Boon 76' c Con: Man. Vunipola (3/5) 40+1', 63', 78'; Pen: Man. Vunipola (3/4) 37', 44', 52'	Report	Try: Cordero 13' m Witty 46' m Dennis 80+4' c Con: Skinner (1/1) 80+5'

Allianz Park
Attendance: 0
Referee: Adam Leal

14 September 2020
19:45

Gloucester	15 – 28	Harlequins
Try: Polledri 45' c Alemanno 66' m Con: Cipriani (1/2) 45'; Pen: Cipriani (1/1) 12'	Report	Try: Murley 14' c Lewies 33' m Steele 60' c Con: M. Smith (2/3) 16', 61'; Pen: M. Smith (3/3) 4', 7', 10'

Kingsholm
Attendance: 1,000
Referee: Karl Dickson

==== Round 21 ====
22 September 2020
17:30

(1 BP) Bath	31 – 20	Gloucester
Try: Dunn (2) 62' c, 67' c Boyce 75' c Spencer 79' c Con: Priestland (4/4) 63', 68', 75', 80'; Pen: Priestland (1/4) 24'	Report	Try: C. Harris 21' c Banahan 58' c Con: Twelvetrees (2/2) 21', 59'; Pen: Twelvetrees (2/3) 11', 39'

Recreation Ground
Attendance: 0
Referee: Craig Maxwell-Keys

28 September 2020
19:45

Harlequins	23 – 32	Wasps (1 BP)
Try: Dombrandt (2) 20' m, 32' c M. Smith 42' c Con: M. Smith (1/3) 33'; Pen: M. Smith (2/2) 40+1', 60'	Report	Try: T. Willis 12' m Oghre 56' c Young 72' c J. Willis 76' c Con: Gopperth (3/4) 58', 73', 77'; Pen: Gopperth (2/2) 37', 80+1'

Twickenham Stoop
Attendance: 0
Referee: Luke Pearce

29 September 2020
17:30

Northampton Saints	14 – 34	Sale Sharks (1 BP)
Try: Tuala 24' c Mitchell 60' c Con: Biggar (2/2) 25', 62'	Report	Try: L. James (2) 5' m, 30' m Penalty try 22'; Hammersley 39' m Janse van Rensburg 72' m Morozov 77' c Con: R. du Preez (1/4) 78'

Franklin's Gardens
Attendance: 0
Referee: Wayne Barnes

30 September 2020
17:30

(1 BP) Bristol Bears	40 – 3	Leicester Tigers
Try: Lloyd 18' c Hughes 29' c Byrne 36' c D. Thomas 45' c Thacker 62' m Con: Sheedy (4/5) 19', 30', 37', 46'	Report	Pen: Henry (1/2) 24'

Ashton Gate
Attendance: 0
Referee: Christophe Ridley

30 September 2020
17:30

(1 BP) Exeter Chiefs	19 – 22	London Irish
Try: Witty 24' m Devoto 33' c Hendrickson 51' c Con: H. Skinner (2/3) 34', 52'	Report	Try: Cornish 28' m Rona 40+1' c Creevy 69' c Con: Jackson (2/3) 40+2', 70'; Pen: Jackson (1/3) 20'

Sandy Park
Attendance: 0
Referee: Ian Tempest

30 September 2020
17:30

(1 BP) Worcester Warriors	40 – 27	Saracens (1 BP)
Try: Hougaard (2) 3' c, 31' c Heward 16' c Penalty try 23'; Beck 67' c T. Hill 78' m Con: Searle (4/5) 4', 17', 32', 69'	Report	Try: Watson (2) 11' c, 18' c Crossdale (2) 40+1' m, 80+2' m Con: Man. Vunipola (2/4) 12', 19'; Pen: Man. Vunipola (1/1) 66'

Sixways
Attendance: 0
Referee: Karl Dickson

==== Round 22 ====
4 October 2020
15:00

(1 BP) Gloucester	20 – 0 Cancelled (Note: After a number of Sale players tested positive for COVID-19 following their match with Northampton the previous round, a number of Northampton players and staff self-isolated as a precaution. Northampton forfeited the game to Gloucester, with Gloucester being awarded four tries and a bonus point victory.)	Northampton Saints
	Report

Kingsholm
Attendance: 0
Referee: Jack Makepeace

4 October 2020
15:00

(1 BP) Leicester Tigers	26 – 32	Harlequins (1 BP)
Try: T. Youngs 11' m Nadolo 46' c Scott 67' m Con: Ford (1/3) 46'; Pen: Ford (3/3) 26', 28', 57'	Report	Try: Dombrandt 18' c Marchant (2) 40+1' c, 49' c Lang 53' m Con: Herron (3/4) 19, 40+2', 50'; Pen: Herron (2/2) 31', 61'

Welford Road
Attendance: 0
Referee: Matthew Carley

4 October 2020
15:00

London Irish	7 – 36	Bristol Bears (1 BP)
Try: Hassell-Collins 62' c Con: Jackson (1/1) 63'	Report	Try: Radradra 13' c Earl 31' c Thacker 67' c Penalty try 76'; Capon 80+1' m Con: Malins (3/4) 14', 32', 68'; Pen: Malins (1/1) 36'

Twickenham Stoop
Attendance: 0
Referee: Karl Dickson

4 October 2020
15:00

Saracens	17 – 17	Bath
Try: Penalty try 64'; Swinson 73' c Con: Man. Vunipola (1/1) 75'; Pen: Man. Vunipola (1/1) 28'	Report	Try: Obano 3' c Spencer 18' c Con: Priestland (2/2) 4', 19'; Pen: Priestland (1/1) 47'

Allianz Park
Attendance: 0
Referee: Wayne Barnes

4 October 2020
15:00

(1 BP) Wasps	46 – 5	Exeter Chiefs
Try: Umaga 25' c Robson 27' c Gopperth 39' m Bassett 43' c Vellacott (2) 62' c, 73' c Con: Gopperth (4/5) 26', 28', 44', 64'; Miller (1/1) 74'; Pen: Gopperth (2/2) 8', 17'	Report	Try: Southworth 56' m

Ricoh Arena
Attendance: 0
Referee: Tom Foley

7 October 2020 (Note: Postponed from 4 October after a number of Sale Sharks players tested positive for COVID-19.)
19:45

Sale Sharks	0 – 20; Cancelled (Note: After a number of Sale players tested positive for COVID-19 following their match with Northampton the previous round, a further round of testing was undertaken and additional positive tests were recorded. Sale Sharks therefore forfeited the game to Worcester, with Worcester being awarded four tries and a bonus point victory.)	Worcester Warriors (1 BP)

AJ Bell Stadium
Attendance: 0
Referee: Ian Tempest

== Play-offs ==
As in previous seasons, the top four teams in the Premiership table, following the conclusion of the regular season, contest the play-off semi-finals in a 1st vs 4th and 2nd vs 3rd format, with the higher ranking team having home advantage. The two winners of the semi-finals then meet in the Premiership Final at Twickenham on 24 October 2020.

=== Bracket ===
Semi-finals
1	Exeter Chiefs	35
4	Bath	6
2	Wasps	47
3	Bristol Bears	24

Final
1	Exeter Chiefs	19
2	Wasps	13

=== Semi-finals ===
10 October 2020
13:30

Wasps (2)	47 – 24	(3) Bristol Bears
Try: Fekitoa 9' c J. Willis 35' c Robson 60' c Kibirige 64' c Minozzi 67' c Con: Gopperth (5/5) 10', 37', 61', 65', 68'; Pen: Gopperth (4/6) 15', 20', 31', 54'	Report	Try: Morahan 22' m Thacker 49' c Randall 74' c Malins 78'; Con: Sheedy (2/4) 50', 75'

Ricoh Arena
Referee: Matthew Carley

10 October 2020
16:30

Exeter Chiefs (1)	35 – 6	(4) Bath
Try: J. Hill (2) 17' c, 63' c Cowan-Dickie 30' c Hogg 51' m Devoto 70' c Con: J. Simmonds (4/5) 18', 31', 64', 71'	Report	Pen: Priestland (2/2) 23', 27'

Sandy Park
Referee: Luke Pearce

=== Final ===
24 October 2020
18:00

Exeter Chiefs (1)	19 – 13	(2) Wasps
Try: Slade 18' c Con: J. Simmonds (1/1) 19'; Pen: J. Simmonds (4/4) 36', 40+1', 66', 80+1'	Report	Try: Umaga 30' c Con: Gopperth (1/1) 31'; Pen: Gopperth (2/2) 13', 57'

Twickenham
Referee: Craig Maxwell-Keys

Team details

Exeter Chiefs
Wasps

FB	15	(Scotland) Stuart Hogg
RW	14	(England) Jack Nowell
OC	13	(England) Henry Slade
IC	12	(England) Ollie Devoto
LW	11	(England) Olly Woodburn
FH	10	(England) Joe Simmonds (c)
SH	9	(England) Jack Maunder
N8	8	(England) Sam Simmonds
OF	7	(South Africa) Jannes Kirsten
BF	6	(England) Dave Ewers
RL	5	(England) Jonny Hill
LL	4	(Scotland) Sam Skinner
TP	3	(England) Harry Williams
HK	2	(England) Luke Cowan-Dickie
LP	1	(England) Alec Hepburn
Replacements:
HK	16	(England) Jack Yeandle
PR	17	(England) Ben Moon
PR	18	(Wales) Tomas Francis
LK	19	(Scotland) Jonny Gray
FL	20	(South Africa) Jacques Vermeulen
SH	21	(Scotland) Sam Hidalgo-Clyne
FH	22	(Ireland) Gareth Steenson
CE	23	(Ireland) Ian Whitten
Coach:
(England) Rob Baxter

FB	15	(Italy) Matteo Minozzi
RW	14	(England) Zach Kibirige
OC	13	(South Africa) Juan de Jongh
IC	12	(New Zealand) Jimmy Gopperth
LW	11	(England) Josh Bassett
FH	10	(England) Jacob Umaga
SH	9	(England) Dan Robson
N8	8	(England) Tom Willis
OF	7	(Wales) Thomas Young
BF	6	(England) Jack Willis
RL	5	(Wales) Will Rowlands
LL	4	(England) Joe Launchbury (c)
TP	3	(New Zealand) Jeffrey Toomaga-Allen
HK	2	(England) Tommy Taylor
LP	1	(England) Tom West
Substitutions:
HK	16	(England) Gabriel Oghre
PR	17	(England) Ben Harris
PR	18	(England) Biyi Alo
LK	19	(England) James Gaskell
FL	20	(England) Ben Morris
SH	21	(Scotland) Ben Vellacott
FH	22	(New Zealand) Lima Sopoaga
CE	23	(Jersey) Michael Le Bourgeois
Coach:
(England) Lee Blackett

Man of the Match:
(England) Henry Slade (Exeter Chiefs)
Touch judges:
Simon Harding
Paul Dix
Television Match Official:
Rowan Kitt

== Leading scorers ==
Note: Flags indicate national union as has been defined under WR eligibility rules. Players may hold more than one non-WR nationality.

=== Most points ===
As of 11 October 2020

Rank	Player	Club	Points
1	(Wales) Rhys Priestland	Bath	206
2	(England) Marcus Smith	Harlequins	198
3	(Wales) Callum Sheedy	Bristol	181
4	(New Zealand) Jimmy Gopperth	Wasps	165
5	(England) Joe Simmonds	Exeter	143
6	(South Africa) Robert du Preez	Sale	141
7	(Scotland) Duncan Weir	Worcester	127
8	(England) Billy Twelvetrees	Gloucester	114
9	(England) James Grayson	Northampton	104
10	(England) Manu Vunipola	Saracens	98

=== Most tries ===
As of 11 October 2020

Rank	Player	Club	Tries
1	(England) Ben Earl	Saracens/Bristol	11
1	(England) Ollie Thorley	Gloucester	11
3	(England) Jonny Hill	Exeter	10
3	(England) Zach Kibirige	Wasps	10
3	(Australia) Luke Morahan	Bristol	10
3	(Wales) Louis Rees-Zammit	Gloucester	10
3	(England) Sam Simmonds	Exeter	10
8	(England) Ollie Hassell-Collins	London Irish	9
8	(England) Ruaridh McConnochie	Bath	9
8	(England) Jack Willis	Wasps	9
