= 2019 Sharks (rugby union) season =

Sharks
- 2019 season
- Head coach: Robert du Preez
- Captain: Louis Schreuder
- Stadium: Jonsson Kings Park, Durban
- Overall: 6th
- South African Conference: 3rd
- Record: Won 7, Drew 1, Lost 8
- Top try scorer: All: Dan du Preez (7)
- Top points scorer: All: Curwin Bosch (97)

In 2019, the Sharks participated in the 2019 Super Rugby competition, the 24th edition of the competition since its inception in 1996. They were included in the South African Conference of the competition, along with the Bulls, Jaguares, Lions and Stormers.

The Sharks won seven, drew one and lost eight of their matches during the regular season of the competition to finish third in the South African Conference, and in 6th place overall to qualify for the finals as a wildcard team. They lost in their quarterfinal match to the Brumbies.

== Personnel ==
=== Coaches and management ===
The Sharks coaching and management staff for the 2019 Super Rugby season were:

2019 Sharks coaches and management
Name	Title
Robert du Preez	Head coach
Ricardo Loubscher	Backline coach
Jaco Pienaar	Forwards coach
Braam van Straaten	Defence coach
David Williams	Attack coach

=== Squad ===
The following players were named in the Sharks squad for the 2019 Super Rugby season:

2019 Sharks squad
Player	Position/s	Date of birth (age)	Super Rugby		Sharks	
Player	Position/s	Date of birth (age)	Apps	Pts	Apps	Pts
(South Africa) Lukhanyo Am	Centre	28 November 1993 (aged 25)	42	40	32	35
(South Africa) Hyron Andrews	Lock	6 July 1995 (aged 23)	20	0	20	0
(South Africa) Curwin Bosch	Fly-half	25 June 1997 (aged 21)	33	178	33	178
(South Africa) Ruan Botha	Lock	10 January 1992 (aged 27)	59	20	33	15
(South Africa) Craig Burden	Hooker	13 May 1985 (aged 33)	47	20	47	20
(South Africa) Phepsi Buthelezi	Loose forward	30 May 1999 (aged 19)	0	0	0	0
(South Africa) Cullen Collopy	Hooker	12 January 1993 (aged 26)	0	0	0	0
(South Africa) Kwanda Dimaza	Loose forward	8 October 1997 (aged 21)	0	0	0	0
(South Africa) Muller du Plessis	Wing	25 June 1999 (aged 19)	0	0	0	0
(South Africa) Dan du Preez	Loose forward	5 August 1995 (aged 23)	37	35	37	35
(South Africa) Jean-Luc du Preez	Loose forward	5 August 1995 (aged 23)	38	30	38	30
(South Africa) Robert du Preez	Fly-half	30 July 1993 (aged 25)	31	322	17	215
(South Africa) Thomas du Toit	Prop	5 May 1995 (aged 23)	52	30	52	30
(South Africa) André Esterhuizen	Centre	30 March 1994 (aged 24)	56	25	56	25
(South Africa) Andrew Evans	Lock	31 March 1997 (aged 21)	0	0	0	0
(South Africa) Aphelele Fassi	Fullback	23 January 1998 (aged 21)	0	0	0	0
(South Africa) Gideon Koegelenberg	Lock	25 November 1994 (aged 24)	1	0	1	0
(South Africa) Marius Louw	Centre	24 October 1995 (aged 23)	17	5	17	5
(South Africa) Mzamo Majola	Prop	20 February 1995 (aged 23)	5	0	1	0
(South Africa) Makazole Mapimpi	Wing	26 July 1990 (aged 28)	24	75	10	20
(South Africa) Fez Mbatha	Hooker	2 August 1999 (aged 19)	0	0	0	0
(South Africa) Khutha Mchunu	Prop	1 July 1997 (aged 21)	0	0	0	0
(South Africa) John-Hubert Meyer	Prop	19 September 1993 (aged 25)	13	0	13	0
(South Africa) Zee Mkhabela	Scrum-half	15 October 1994 (aged 24)	2	0	0	0
(South Africa) Tendai Mtawarira	Prop	1 August 1985 (aged 33)	150	25	150	25
(South Africa) Tera Mtembu	Loose forward	9 December 1990 (aged 28)	47	25	47	25
(South Africa) Lwazi Mvovo	Wing	3 June 1986 (aged 32)	129	185	129	185
(South Africa) S'busiso Nkosi	Wing	21 January 1996 (aged 23)	20	30	20	30
(South Africa) Sanele Nohamba	Scrum-half	19 January 1999 (aged 20)	0	0	0	0
(South Africa) Coenie Oosthuizen	Prop	22 March 1989 (aged 29)	102	50	28	10
(South Africa) Tyler Paul	Loose forward	20 January 1995 (aged 24)	30	10	15	5
(South Africa) Chiliboy Ralepelle	Hooker	11 September 1986 (aged 32)	104	30	35	10
(South Africa) Dylan Richardson	Loose forward	15 January 1999 (aged 20)	0	0	0	0
(South Africa) Juan Schoeman	Prop	18 September 1991 (aged 27)	27	0	27	0
(South Africa) Louis Schreuder	Scrum-half	25 April 1990 (aged 28)	96	20	16	5
(South Africa) Rhyno Smith	Fullback	11 February 1993 (aged 26)	8	0	8	0
(South Africa) Luke Stringer	Loose forward	12 December 1995 (aged 23)	0	0	0	0
(South Africa) Akker van der Merwe	Hooker	17 June 1991 (aged 27)	64	50	15	15
(South Africa) JJ van der Mescht	Lock	4 May 1999 (aged 19)	0	0	0	0
(South Africa) Philip van der Walt	Loose forward	14 July 1989 (aged 29)	85	30	36	5
(South Africa) Ruben van Heerden	Lock	27 October 1997 (aged 21)	5	0	0	0
(South Africa) Kerron van Vuuren	Hooker	23 May 1995 (aged 23)	0	0	0	0
(South Africa) Kobus van Wyk	Wing	22 January 1992 (aged 27)	54	100	24	55
(South Africa) Jacques Vermeulen	Loose forward	8 February 1995 (aged 24)	22	10	22	10
(South Africa) Wian Vosloo	Loose forward	15 February 1995 (aged 24)	6	0	6	0
(South Africa) Jeremy Ward	Centre	10 January 1996 (aged 23)	15	5	13	5
(South Africa) Grant Williams	Scrum-half	22 July 1996 (aged 22)	1	0	1	0
(South Africa) Courtney Winnaar	Fullback	27 March 1997 (aged 21)	0	0	0	0
(South Africa) Cameron Wright	Scrum-half	20 April 1994 (aged 24)	18	10	18	10
(South Africa) Leolin Zas	Wing	20 October 1995 (aged 23)	15	40	0	0
Note: Players' ages and statistics are correct as of 15 February 2019, the date of the opening round of the competition.

== Standings ==
2019 Super Rugby standings
Pos	Team	Pld	W	D	L	PF	PA	PD	TF	TA	TB	LB	Pts	Qualification
1	Crusaders (C)	16	11	3	2	497	257	+240	73	31	8	0	58	Quarter-finals (Conference leaders)
2	Jaguares	16	11	0	5	461	352	+109	60	38	5	2	51	Quarter-finals (Conference leaders)
3	Brumbies	16	10	0	6	430	366	+64	65	49	5	3	48	Quarter-finals (Conference leaders)
4	Hurricanes	16	12	1	3	449	362	+87	60	46	3	0	53	Quarter-finals (Wildcard)
5	Bulls	16	8	2	6	410	369	+41	42	50	3	2	41	Quarter-finals (Wildcard)
6	Sharks	16	7	1	8	343	335	+8	40	39	3	4	37	Quarter-finals (Wildcard)
7	Chiefs	16	7	2	7	451	465	−14	63	59	2	2	36	Quarter-finals (Wildcard)
8	Highlanders	16	6	3	7	441	392	+49	60	53	2	4	36	Quarter-finals (Wildcard)
9	Lions	16	8	0	8	401	478	−77	53	64	2	1	35	
10	Stormers	16	7	1	8	344	366	−22	34	46	1	4	35	
11	Rebels	16	7	0	9	393	465	−72	56	61	3	3	34	
12	Waratahs	16	6	0	10	367	415	−48	46	54	0	6	30	
13	Blues	16	5	1	10	347	369	−22	45	47	2	6	30	
14	Reds	16	6	0	10	385	438	−53	50	59	1	3	28	
15	Sunwolves	16	2	0	14	294	584	−290	34	85	0	4	12	

Source: Super Rugby

The table below shows the Sharks' progression throughout the season. For each round, their cumulative points total is shown with the overall log position:

Team	R1	R2	R3	R4	R5	R6	R7	R8	R9	R10	R11	R12	R13	R14	R15	R16	R17	R18	QF	SF	Final
Opposition	SUN	BLU	STO	BUL	Bye	REB	BUL	LIO	JAG	RED	WAR	CRU	CHI	Bye	LIO	HUR	JAG	STO			
Cumulative Points																					
Position (overall)																					
Position (SA Conf.)																					
Key:	win	draw	loss	bye																	

== Matches ==
The Sharks played the following matches during the 2019 Super Rugby season:

16 February 2019	Sunwolves	10–45	Sharks	National Stadium, Singapore
12:55	Try: Shane Gates 8'; Con: Hayden Parker 9'; Pen: Hayden Parker 14'	Scoreboard	Try: Akker van der Merwe 16', 64'; Dan du Preez 34'; S'busiso Nkosi 38'; Makazole Mapimpi 46'; Jeremy Ward 71'; Con: Robert du Preez 17', 35', 39', 47', 65'; Rhyno Smith 73'; Pen: Robert du Preez 4'	Referee: Nic Berry

23 February 2019	Sharks	26–7	Blues	Jonsson Kings Park, Durban
15:05	Try: Aphelele Fassi 7'; Akker van der Merwe 15'; Robert du Preez 36'; Curwin Bosch 79'; Con: Robert du Preez 17', 37', 80'	Scoreboard	Try: Tanielu Tele’a 61'; Con: Otere Black 62'	Referee: Paul Williams

2 March 2019	Sharks	11–16	Stormers	Jonsson Kings Park, Durban
17:15	Try: Lukhanyo Am 42'; Pen: Robert du Preez 15', 51'	Scoreboard	Try: Damian Willemse 4'; Con: SP Marais 5'; Pen: SP Marais 28', 38', 65'	Referee: Jaco Peyper

9 March 2019	Bulls	37–14	Sharks	Loftus Versfeld, Pretoria
17:15	Try: Jesse Kriel 19'; Rosko Specman 43', 80'; Con: Handré Pollard 21', 80'; Pen: Handré Pollard 3', 9', 29', 35', 52'; Drop: Handré Pollard 78'	Scoreboard	Try: Jeremy Ward 41'; Dan du Preez 55'; Con: Robert du Preez 42', 55'	Referee: Marius van der Westhuizen

23 March 2019	Sharks	28–14	Rebels	Jonsson Kings Park, Durban
17:15	Try: Dan du Preez 6'; Robert du Preez 52'; Makazole Mapimpi 58'; Con: Robert du Preez 7', 52'; Pen: Robert du Preez 17', 27', 37'	Scoreboard	Try: Tom English 20'; Jack Maddocks 31'; Con: Quade Cooper 22', 32'	Referee: Rasta Rasivhenge

30 March 2019	Sharks	16–19	Bulls	Jonsson Kings Park, Durban
15:05	Try: Dan du Preez 40'; André Esterhuizen 71'; Pen: Robert du Preez 5', 61'	Scoreboard	Try: Jesse Kriel 52'; Con: Handré Pollard 52'; Pen: Handré Pollard 2', 28', 67', 79'	Referee: Mike Fraser

5 April 2019	Lions	5–42	Sharks	Emirates Airline Park, Johannesburg
19:10	Try: Sylvian Mahuza 79'	Scoreboard	Try: Jacques Vermeulen 19'; Makazole Mapimpi 22', 37'; Lukhanyo Am 26'; Thomas du Toit 71'; Aphelele Fassi 80'; Con: Robert du Preez 27'; Curwin Bosch 73', 80'; Pen: Robert du Preez 31'; Curwin Bosch 47'	Referee: Mike Fraser

13 April 2019	Sharks	17–51	Jaguares	Jonsson Kings Park, Durban
15:05	Try: Hyron Andrews 11'; Aphelele Fassi 55'; Con: Robert du Preez 12'; Curwin Bosch 57'; Pen: Robert du Preez 22'	Scoreboard	Try: Tomás Cubelli 3'; Pablo Matera 33', 42'; Matías Orlando 37', 66', 80'; Matías Moroni 53'; Con: Domingo Miotti 4', 34', 38', 44', 68'; Pen: Domingo Miotti 51', 61'	Referee: Nick Briant

19 April 2019	Sharks	14–21	Reds	Jonsson Kings Park, Durban
15:05	Try: Kerron van Vuuren 24'; Dan du Preez 79'; Con: Robert du Preez 26'; Curwin Bosch 80'	Scoreboard	Try: Bryce Hegarty 2'; Chris Feauai-Sautia 19'; Tate McDermott 59'; Con: Bryce Hegarty 3', 20'; Hamish Stewart 60'	Referee: Federico Anselmi

27 April 2019	Waratahs	15–23	Sharks	Western Sydney Stadium, Sydney
11:45	Try: Jake Gordon 24'; Bernard Foley 80'; Con: Bernard Foley 26'; Pen: Bernard Foley 7'	Scoreboard	Try: Dan du Preez 13'; André Esterhuizen 52'; Con: Curwin Bosch 14', 53'; Pen: Curwin Bosch 29', 69', 72'	Referee: Nic Berry

3 May 2019	Crusaders	21–21	Sharks	AMI Stadium, Christchurch
9:35	Try: Codie Taylor 11'; Jack Goodhue 55'; Mitchell Hunt 80'; Con: Mitchell Hunt 12', 56', 80'	Scoreboard	Pen: Curwin Bosch 8', 21', 35', 43', 50', 68', 74'	Referee: Brendon Pickerill

11 May 2019	Chiefs	29–23	Sharks	FMG Stadium Waikato, Hamilton
09:35	Try: Brad Weber 26', 70'; Mitchell Karpik 34'; Anton Lienert-Brown 68'; Con: Marty McKenzie 27', 35', 71'; Pen: Marty McKenzie 10'	Scoreboard	Try: Hyron Andrews 31'; Ruan Botha 56'; Con: Curwin Bosch 32', 57'; Pen: Curwin Bosch 30', 38', 61'	Referee: Nic Berry

25 May 2019	Sharks	27–17	Lions	Jonsson Kings Park, Durban
17:15	Try: Curwin Bosch 16'; Dan du Preez 23'; Makazole Mapimpi 59'; Con: Curwin Bosch 18', 25', 61'; Pen: Curwin Bosch 54', 76'	Scoreboard	Try: Lionel Mapoe 31'; Cyle Brink 49'; Con: Elton Jantjies 32', 49'; Pen: Elton Jantjies 73'	Referee: Marius van der Westhuizen

1 June 2019	Sharks	17–30	Hurricanes	Jonsson Kings Park, Durban
15:05	Try: Aphelele Fassi 38'; Juan Schoeman 44'; Con: Curwin Bosch 40', 46'; Pen: Curwin Bosch 9'	Scoreboard	Try: Jordie Barrett 6'; Ngani Laumape 32'; Wes Goosen 66'; Con: Beauden Barrett 7', 34', 68'; Pen: Beauden Barrett 12', 16', 63'	Referee: Nic Berry

8 June 2019	Jaguares	34–7	Sharks	José Amalfitani Stadium, Buenos Aires
21:40	Try: Sebastián Cancelliere 2', 59'; Emiliano Boffelli 15', 53'; Santiago Carreras 80'; Con: Joaquín Díaz Bonilla 16', 54', 60'; Pen: Joaquín Díaz Bonilla 44'	Scoreboard	Try: André Esterhuizen 68'; Con: Curwin Bosch 68'	Referee: Nick Briant

15 June 2019	Stormers	9–12	Sharks	DHL Newlands, Cape Town
15:05	Pen: Joshua Stander 23', 44'; Jean-Luc du Plessis 76'	Scoreboard	Try: Rhyno Smith 28'; Lukhanyo Am 80'; Con: Robert du Preez 80'	Referee: AJ Jacobs

Quarterfinal	22 June 2019	Brumbies	38–13	Sharks	GIO Stadium, Canberra
	12:05	Try: Pete Samu 1', 24'; Henry Speight 10'; Joe Powell 72'; Matt Lucas 79'; Con: Christian Lealiifano 2', 12', 26', 73', 80'; Pen: Christian Lealiifano 20'	Scoreboard	Try: André Esterhuizen 56'; Con: Curwin Bosch 57'; Pen: Curwin Bosch 8', 15'	Referee: Mike Fraser

== Player statistics ==
The Super Rugby appearance record for players that represented the Sharks in 2019 is as follows:

2019 Sharks player statistics
Player name	SUN	BLU	STO	BUL	REB	BUL	LIO	JAG	RED	WAR	CRU	CHI	LIO	HUR	JAG	STO	BRU	SF	F	App	Try	Con	Pen	DG	Pts
Tendai Mtawarira	1	1	1	1	1	1	1		1	1								—	—	9	0	0	0	0	0
Akker van der Merwe	2	2	2	2	2	2				16 (substituted in)	16 (substituted in)							—	—	8	3	0	0	0	15
Coenie Oosthuizen	3	3	3	3	3	3	3		3	18 (substituted in)	3	3	3	3	3	3	3	—	—	16	0	0	0	0	0
Hyron Andrews	4	4	4	5	5	5	5	5	5	5	19 (substituted in)	4	19 (substituted in)	19 (substituted in)	4	5	5	—	—	17	2	0	0	0	10
Ruan Botha	5	5	5							19 (substituted in)	5	5	5	5	5			—	—	9	1	0	0	0	5
Jacques Vermeulen	6	6	6	7	7	7	7		7	20 (substituted in)	20 (substituted in)	6	20 (substituted in)	6	6	6	6	—	—	16	1	0	0	0	5
Tyler Paul	7	7	7						19 (substituted in)			19 (substituted in)		20 (substituted in)	7	7	7	—	—	9	0	0	0	0	0
Dan du Preez	8	8	8	8	8	8	8	8	8	8	8		8	8	8	8	8	—	—	16	7	0	0	0	35
Louis Schreuder	9	9	9	9	9	9	9	9	9	21 (substituted in)	9	9	9	9	9	9	9	—	—	17	0	0	0	0	0
Robert du Preez	10	10	10	10	10	10	10	10	10	22 (substituted in)	22 (substituted in)	22 (substituted in)	22 (substituted in)	22 (substituted in)	10	10	10	—	—	17	2	16	10	0	72
Makazole Mapimpi	11	11	11	11	11	11	11	11		11	11	11	11	11	11	11	11	—	—	16	5	0	0	0	25
André Esterhuizen	12	12	12	22 (substituted in)	12	12	12	12	12	12	12		12	12	12	12	12	—	—	16	4	0	0	0	20
Lukhanyo Am	13	13	13	13	13	13	13	13		13	13	13	13	13	13	13	13	—	—	16	3	0	0	0	15
S'busiso Nkosi	14	14	14	14	14				14	14	14	14	14	14	14	14	14	—	—	14	1	0	0	0	5
Aphelele Fassi	15	15	15		15	15	23 (substituted in)	23 (substituted in)	23 (substituted in)	15	15	15	15	15	23 (substituted in)	15		—	—	15	4	0	0	0	20
Kerron van Vuuren	16 (substituted in)	16 (substituted in)	16 (substituted in)			16 (substituted in)	2	2	2	2	2	2	2	2	2	2	2	—	—	15	1	0	0	0	5
Juan Schoeman	17 (substituted in)	17 (substituted in)	17 (substituted in)	17 (substituted in)	17 (substituted in)		17 (substituted in)	1	17 (substituted in)				17 (substituted in)	17 (substituted in)	17 (substituted in)		17 (substituted in)	—	—	12	1	0	0	0	5
Khutha Mchunu	18 (substituted in)					18 (substituted in)												—	—	2	0	0	0	0	0
Gideon Koegelenberg	19 (substituted in)	19 (substituted in)	19 (substituted in)	4	19 (substituted in)	19										19	19 (substituted in)	—	—	6	0	0	0	0	0
Phepsi Buthelezi	20 (substituted in)	20 (substituted in)	20 (substituted in)	20 (substituted in)	6													—	—	5	0	0	0	0	0
Cameron Wright	21 (substituted in)	21 (substituted in)	21 (substituted in)						21 (substituted in)	9	21 (substituted in)	21 (substituted in)	21 (substituted in)			21 (substituted in)	21 (substituted in)	—	—	10	0	0	0	0	0
Rhyno Smith	22 (substituted in)		23 (substituted in)	15												23 (substituted in)	23 (substituted in)	—	—	5	1	1	0	0	7
Jeremy Ward	23 (substituted in)	22 (substituted in)	22 (substituted in)	12											22 (substituted in)	22 (substituted in)	22 (substituted in)	—	—	7	2	0	0	0	10
Thomas du Toit		18 (substituted in)	18 (substituted in)	18 (substituted in)	18 (substituted in)	17 (substituted in)	18 (substituted in)	3	18 (substituted in)	3	1	1		18 (substituted in)	18 (substituted in)	17 (substituted in)	18 (substituted in)	—	—	15	1	0	0	0	5
Curwin Bosch		23 (substituted in)		23 (substituted in)	23 (substituted in)	23 (substituted in)	15	15	15	10	10	10	10	10	15		15	—	—	14	2	15	19	0	97
Wian Vosloo				6														—	—	1	0	0	0	0	0
Fez Mbatha				16 (substituted in)			16 (substituted in)	16 (substituted in)	16 (substituted in)			16						—	—	4	0	0	0	0	0
Ruben van Heerden				19 (substituted in)	4	4	4	4	4	4	4		4	4	19 (substituted in)	4	4	—	—	13	0	0	0	0	0
Grant Williams				21 (substituted in)	21 (substituted in)	21 (substituted in)	21 (substituted in)	21 (substituted in)										—	—	5	0	0	0	0	0
Craig Burden					16										16 (substituted in)			—	—	1	0	0	0	0	0
Luke Stringer					20 (substituted in)	6	6	6				20 (substituted in)			20 (substituted in)	20 (substituted in)	20 (substituted in)	—	—	8	0	0	0	0	0
Marius Louw					22 (substituted in)				22 (substituted in)	23 (substituted in)	23 (substituted in)	12						—	—	5	0	0	0	0	0
Lwazi Mvovo						14	14	14	11									—	—	4	0	0	0	0	0
Philip van der Walt						20 (substituted in)	20 (substituted in)	7	6	6	6	8	6					—	—	8	0	0	0	0	0
Kobus van Wyk						22 (substituted in)	22 (substituted in)	22 (substituted in)	13			23 (substituted in)	23 (substituted in)	23 (substituted in)				—	—	7	0	0	0	0	0
JJ van der Mescht							19 (substituted in)	19 (substituted in)										—	—	2	0	0	0	0	0
Mzamo Majola								17 (substituted in)		17 (substituted in)	17	17 (substituted in)	1	1	1	1	1	—	—	8	0	0	0	0	0
John-Hubert Meyer								18 (substituted in)			18 (substituted in)	18 (substituted in)	18 (substituted in)			18		—	—	4	0	0	0	0	0
Jean-Luc du Preez								20 (substituted in)	20 (substituted in)	7	7	7	7	7				—	—	7	0	0	0	0	0
Dylan Richardson													16 (substituted in)					—	—	1	0	0	0	0	0
Cullen Collopy														16 (substituted in)		16	16 (substituted in)	—	—	2	0	0	0	0	0
Zee Mkhabela														21 (substituted in)	21 (substituted in)			—	—	2	0	0	0	0	0
Total																				17	41	32	29	0	356

(c) denotes the team captain. For each match, the player's squad number is shown. Starting players are numbered 1 to 15, while the replacements are numbered 16 to 23. If a replacement made an appearance in the match, it is indicated by (substituted in) . "App" refers to the number of appearances made by the player, "Try" to the number of tries scored by the player, "Con" to the number of conversions kicked, "Pen" to the number of penalties kicked, "DG" to the number of drop goals kicked and "Pts" refer to the total number of points scored by the player.

- Kwanda Dimaza, Muller du Plessis, Andrew Evans, Tera Mtembu, Sanele Nohamba, Chiliboy Ralepelle, Courtney Winnaar and Leolin Zas did not make any appearances.

== See also ==
- Sharks
- 2019 Super Rugby season
