= Tom West (rugby union) =

English rugby union player (born 1996)

- Born: Thomas Henry West; 11 February 1996 (age 30) Diss, England
- Height: 1.85 m (6 ft 1 in)
- Weight: 117 kg (18 st 6 lb)
- School: Radley College

Rugby union career
- Position: Loosehead Prop
- Current team: Northampton Saints
Senior career
Years	Team	Apps	(Points)
2016–2022	Wasps	78	(40)
2016–2018	→ Nottingham	32	(25)
2023	Leicester Tigers	11	(0)
2023–2024	Saracens	11	(0)
2024–	Northampton Saints	23	(5)
- Correct as of 25 May 2025
International career
Years	Team	Apps	(Points)
2015–2016	England U20	10	(0)
- Correct as of 28 December 2020

Tom West (born 11 February 1996) is an English professional rugby union player who plays as a loosehead prop, for Northampton Saints in Premiership Rugby. He previously played for Leicester Tigers and Wasps, also in Premiership Rugby.

== Club career ==
West worked his way through Wasps’ Junior Academy while a pupil at Radley College prior to joining the Senior Academy in 2015. He made his club debut in an Anglo-Welsh Cup game at Sale Sharks, and his Premiership debut at home to Saracens in January 2018.

Despite making his league debut for Wasps in the 2017/18 season, West would spend the best part of two seasons on loan at Championship side Nottingham, making only twelve first team appearances across three seasons heading into the 2019/20 campaign. He started in the 2020 Premiership Final as Wasps finished runners up to Exeter Chiefs.

Wasps entered administration on 17 October 2022 and West was made redundant along with all other players and coaching staff. On 19 January 2023 he was signed by Leicester Tigers until the end of the 2022-23 season.

On 8 April 2023, West signed for Premiership rivals Saracens ahead of the 2023-24 season. On 8 May 2024, West would leave Saracens to sign for rivals Northampton Saints ahead of the 2024-25 season.

== International career ==
West participated in the 2015 Six Nations Under 20s Championship and 2016 Six Nations Under 20s Championship. He was a member of the England under-20 team that hosted the 2016 World Rugby Under 20 Championship and featured as a second-half replacement in the final as the hosts defeated Ireland to become junior world champions.

In January 2021 West received a call-up to the senior England squad prior to the 2021 Six Nations, after prop Joe Marler withdrew from the group for family reasons.
