= Jack Stanley (rugby union) =

English rugby union player

- Born: Jack Raymond Stanley; 7 January 1997 (age 29) Exeter, England
- Height: 1.92 m (6 ft 4 in)
- Weight: 121 kg (19 st 1 lb)

Rugby union career
- Position: Prop
Amateur team(s)
Years	Team	Apps	(Points)
–	Helston RFC		
–	Penzance and Newlyn RFC		
2018–2020	Watsonian	22	(5)
- Correct as of 28 October 2020
Senior career
Years	Team	Apps	(Points)
2014–2016	Exeter Chiefs	1	(0)
2015–2016	→ Rotherham Titans	1	(0)
2018–2020	Edinburgh	6	(0)
2020–2022	Gloucester	14	(5)
- Correct as of 28 October 2020
International career
Years	Team	Apps	(Points)
2015–2016	England U18s		
2016–2017	England U20s		
- Correct as of 28 October 2020

Jack Stanley (born 7 January 1997) is an English rugby union player whose main position is prop. Currently unattached he previously played for Gloucester.

== Career ==
Stanley started playing at Helston RFC, aged seven, in Cornwall, England. Aged 12, he joined Cornish Pirates in their junior academy where he was selected for England South U16s at the Wellington Festival. He then became a part of Exeter Chiefs academy, where he was dual-registered for Rotherham Titans for professional development. He made his debut for Exeter Chiefs in the Anglo-Welsh Cup defeating Gloucester 28–27 in November 2014.

He was selected for England U18s for their development tour in South Africa. He then went on to play for England U20s during the 2016–17 season.

Stanley signed for Edinburgh in the Pro 14 after a successful trial for the remainder of the 2018–19 season, where he gained game time for partner club Watsonian in the Super 6. He extended his contract for a further season for the 2019–20 season. However, on 3 March 2020, Stanley left Edinburgh with immediate effect to sign for Gloucester in the Premiership Rugby. He made his debut as a replacement for Gloucester against local rivals Worcester Warriors on 15 August 2020 during the resumption of the 2019–20 Premiership Rugby season.
