= Cameron Boon =

English rugby union player (born 1999)

- Born: Cameron Boon; 8 September 1999 (age 27)
- Height: 2.08 m (6 ft 10 in)
- Weight: 110 kg (17 st 5 lb)
- School: Bishop's Stortford College
- University: Loughborough University

Rugby union career
- Position: Second row
- Current team: Saracens
Amateur team(s)
Years	Team	Apps	(Points)
–	Welwyn		
Senior career
Years	Team	Apps	(Points)
2018–	Saracens	8	(5)
2022	→Eastwood	7	
- Correct as of 25 September 2022
International career
Years	Team	Apps	(Points)
–	England U18	–	(–)
–	Ireland U18	–	(–)
- Correct as of 25 September 2022

Cameron Boon (born 8 September 1999) is an English professional rugby union player, who currently plays as a lock for Premiership Rugby side Saracens.

== Early life ==
Boon is of English and Irish descent. He began playing rugby at Welwyn at the age of five and later represented Hertfordshire at county level. As a sixth-form student at Bishop's Stortford College, he captained the school's rugby team. During his studies for a bachelor's degree in accounting and financial management at Loughborough University, he also played for Loughborough Students under a university contract while part of the Saracens academy.

== Club career ==
Boon joined the Saracens junior academy as a teenager, and played for the U18s team in the Premiership Academy League, before graduating into the senior academy in 2018. He was part of the Saracens Storm squad that won the Premiership Rugby Shield in 2019, which included appearing in the 55–14 final triumph against Newcastle Falcons A. The following season, he made his first-team debut, coming off the bench in at 36–20 Premiership victory over Gloucester in August 2020. A month later, he scored his first Premiership try, helping Saracens to defeat Exeter Chiefs by 40–17.

In the 2021–22 season, Boon was primarily deployed in the Premiership Rugby Cup. He also continued his development in Australia with a loan spell at Eastwood. Ahead of the 2022–23 season, Boon was promoted into the Saracens first-team squad.

== International career ==
Boon is qualified to represent England and Ireland. As such, he has played for both the England U18s and the Ireland U18s during his youth career, having been noted as a line-out specialist due to his six-foot 10 inch frame.
