= Sam James (rugby union) =

England international rugby union player

- Born: Samuel George James; 3 July 1994 (age 32) Manchester, England
- Height: 1.93 m (6 ft 4 in)
- Weight: 98.18 kg (15 st 6 lb; 216 lb)
- School: Wilmslow High School
- Notable relative: Luke James (brother)

Rugby union career
- Position(s): Centre, Fullback, Fly-Half
- Current team: Racing 92
Senior career
Years	Team	Apps	(Points)
2013–2024	Sale Sharks	244	(199)
2024–	Racing 92	40	(25)
- Correct as of 20 May 2025
International career
Years	Team	Apps	(Points)
2016	England Saxons	2	(0)
- Correct as of 17 June 2016

Sam James (born 3 July 1994) is an English rugby union player, currently playing with Racing 92. He usually plays as a centre but can also play as a fullback or fly-half. Sam is known for his magnificent handling and ball skills, as well as his kicking game.

== Club career ==
Sam made his professional debut against Northampton Saints on 21 April 2013 at 19 years of age. James played every minute of the 2018-19 Gallagher Premiership season, the only player in the entire league to do so. He was selected in the BT Sport Dream Team for the 2019-20 Gallagher Premiership season, in which BT Sport pundits choose their team of the season. He has amassed over 200 caps for Sale, with over 150 of these coming in the Premiership, making him one of the more experienced players in the squad. This seniority within the squad has led to James captaining the side on numerous occasions.

Sam announced in May 2024 that he'd be leaving Sale at the end of the season. In his final home game for Sale, he scored his 39th try for the club and was awarded Man of the Match. In July 2024 James signed a one-year deal with Racing 92, signing a two-year extension later in the season, seeing him through to 2027.

== International career ==
James toured South Africa with England Saxons in the summer of 2016.

Sam made his England debut in 2017 against the Barbarians in a non-capped game, providing an impressive offload to assist Nathan Earle's try.

He was called up to the senior England squad by Eddie Jones for their 2017 summer tour of Argentina.

== Honours ==
Individual

- Sale Sharks Young Player of the Season: 2014–15, 2015–16.
- BT Sport Team Dream Team: 2019-20.

Sale Sharks

- Premiership Rugby Cup: 2019-20.
- Premiership Rugby runner-up: 2022-23.
