= Jean-Luc du Preez =

South Africa international rugby union player

- Born: 5 August 1995 (age 31) Durban, KwaZulu-Natal, South Africa
- Height: 1.94 m (6 ft 4 1/2 in)
- Weight: 113 kg (17 st 11 lb; 249 lb)
- School: Kearsney College
- University: Sharks Academy
- Notable relative(s): Robert du Preez (father), Robert du Preez (brother), Dan du Preez (brother)

Rugby union career
- Position: Loose forward / Lock
- Current team: Sale Sharks
Youth career
- 2008–2015: Sharks
Senior career
Years	Team	Apps	(Points)
2015	Sharks XV	4	(0)
2015–2018	Sharks (Currie Cup)	18	(10)
2015–2019	Sharks	144	(100)
2018–2025	Sale Sharks	104	(80)
2025–	Bordeaux	0	(0)
- Correct as of 20 August 2025
International career
Years	Team	Apps	(Points)
2012–2013	South Africa Schools	5	(5)
2014–2015	South Africa U20	8	(0)
2016, 2021	South Africa A	5	(5)
2016–	South Africa	16	(10)
- Correct as of 20 August 2025

Jean-Luc du Preez (born 5 August 1995 is a South African rugby union player for Bordeaux in the French Top 14. He made his debut for South Africa in 2016 and his regular position is flanker, although he also plays at lock and number eight.

== Early life and career ==
He was born in Durban. He is the son of former Sharks coach and South Africa player Robert du Preez, and the brother of teammates Robert du Preez and Dan du Preez.

Du Preez was selected in a number of KwaZulu-Natal youth squads whilst still at school. At primary school level, he was selected for their squad that played at the 2008 Under-13 Craven Week competition. He also played in the premier schools competition in South Africa – the Under-18 Craven Week in three different seasons; he made two appearances at the 2011 event in Kimberley, three appearances at the 2012 event in Port Elizabeth and a further three appearances in 2013, scoring two tries in their match against Border.

In both 2012 and 2013, Du Preez was selected to represent a South African Schools team. In 2012, he played in their matches against France, Wales and England and in 2013 he made appearances against France and Wales, in which game he also scored a try.

In 2014, he was included in the South Africa Under-20 squad that played at the 2014 IRB Junior World Championship in New Zealand. He played off the bench in their 61–5 victory over Scotland and started their next match against hosts New Zealand, helping South Africa to a 33–24 win. He sustained a blow to the head during the match and missed their final pool match against Samoa and their 32–25 semi-final match against New Zealand. He recovered in time for the final against England and played off the bench just after half-time, but could not prevent South Africa losing the match 20–21 to finish the competition as runners-up.

He returned to domestic action to play a key part in the Sharks U19 side that played in the 2014 Under-19 Provincial Championship; he made twelve appearances and scored tries a total of seven tries, including two in their match against Golden Lions U19, to help them qualify for the semi-finals, where they lost 20–43 to the Blue Bulls U19s.

In 2015, he was again named in a 37-man training squad for the South Africa national under-20 rugby union team and started for them in a friendly match against a Varsity Cup Dream Team in April 2015. He was included in the squad that embarked on a two-match tour of Argentina. He didn't feature in their 25–22 victory over Argentina, but started their 39–28 victory a few days later.

Upon the team's return, he was named in the final squad for the 2015 World Rugby Under 20 Championship. He started all three of their matches in Pool B of the competition; a 33–5 win against hosts Italy, a 40–8 win against Samoa and a 46–13 win over Australia to help South Africa finish top of Pool B to qualify for the semi-finals with the best record pool stage of all the teams in the competition. Du Preez started their semi-final match against England, but could not prevent them losing 20–28 to be eliminated from the competition by England for the second year in succession. He played off the bench in their third-place play-off match against France, helping South Africa to a 31–18 win to secure third place in the competition.

== Club career ==
=== Sharks ===
Du Preez made his provincial first class debut on 21 March 2015, starting the match for the Sharks XV in their 53–0 victory over the Border Bulldogs in the opening match of the 2015 Vodacom Cup competition. He also started their matches against Free State XV and Boland Cavaliers and played off the bench against the SWD Eagles.

=== Sale Sharks ===
In November 2018, he joined the Sale Sharks on loan until February 2019. He made six appearances and scored one try during his loan spell, which was cut short after he picked up an injury in their match against Gloucester. On 18 July 2019, Sale announced that Du Preez and his brother Daniel du Preez had signed permanent deals with the club. He went on to make 27 appearances for Sale Sharks in the 2019-20 season, scoring tries against Bath in the Gallagher Premiership and La Rochelle in the Champions Cup. At the end of the 2019-20 season Du Preez won the Premiership Rugby Cup with Sale, starting in the final which saw Sale defeat Harlequins 27-19

Du Preez made frequent appearances for Sale in the 2020-21 season, playing for the club 21 times and scoring tries against Northampton Saints and Harlequins. He also featuring in Sale's Champions Cups quarter final defeat to La Rochelle. At the conclusion of the season Sale made their first appearance in the playoffs since the 2005-6 season, with Du Preez starting in Sale's 40-30 semi-final defeat to Exeter Chiefs.

He made 25 appearances in the 2021-22 season, scoring 4 tries in the Premiership and 2 in the Champion's Cup. In October 2022 he extended his contract at Sale until 2026. During the 2022-23 season, Du Preez started in Sale's 35-25 Premiership Final defeat to Saracens.

On 7 May 2025 it was announced that Du Preez would leave Sale Sharks to take up a playing opportunity abroad at the conclusion of the 2024-25 season.

=== Bordeaux ===
On 15 July 2025, Jean-Luc would leave Sale Sharks in England to move to France to sign for Bordeaux in the Top 14 competition from the 2025-26 season.

== International career ==
In 2016, Du Preez was included in a South Africa 'A' squad that played a two-match series against a touring England Saxons team. He came on as a replacement in their first match in Bloemfontein, but ended on the losing side as the visitors ran out 32–24 winners. He then started the second match of the series, scoring the home team's first try in a 26–29 defeat to the Saxons in George.

He was included in the South Africa squad for the 2016 Autumn Internationals on the 22 October 2016. He made his first appearance in a non-capped game for South Africa XV against the Barbarians, which ended in a 31-31 draw. His first international cap came in an appearance off of the bench against Wales on the 26 November 2016.

Du Preez was initially called up to the South Africa 'A' for the 2017 mid-year rugby union internationals, with two matches scheduled against the French Barbarians. He was then called up to the main Springbok squad on the 27 May 2017. Du Preez featured in all three tests in the series, coming off the bench in the first two and starting in the final test. South Africa won the test series 3-0.

He was named in the squad for the 2017 Rugby Championship on the 5 August 2017. He played all 5 games for South Africa in the tournament, scoring tries in South Africa's win against Argentina in Salta and in a close loss against New Zealand. The only game which Du Preez started was a heavy 57-0 loss to New Zealand. A fractured ankle ruled him out of the 2017 end-of-year rugby union internationals.

He was named in the squad for the 2018 England tour of South Africa. Du Preez started the first test against England, which South Africa won 42-39. He came off the bench in the other two tests in the series, which South Africa won 2-1.

On the 5 June 2021 Du Preez was named as part of the South Africa squad for the 2021 British & Irish Lions tour to South Africa. He made one appearance during the tour, starting for South Africa 'A' in a 14-17 loss to the Bulls. He was then released from the squad before then first test match against the Lions. He was recalled to the South Africa squad for the 2021 Rugby Championship on the 15 August but did not feature in any of the matches during the tournament.

Du Preez was named as part of the South Africa 'A' squad which would play Munster during the 2022 end-of-year rugby union internationals. He started the South Africa 'A' matches against Munster and Bristol Bears, losing both matches.

In June 2023 he was named as part of the 40 man training squad for the 2023 Rugby Championship.

On June 5, 2025 Du Preez was named as part of the Springbok's 54 player training squad for the 2025 mid-year rugby union tests. He was retained in the 45 player squad following the release of a number of players. He was named in the starting line-up for South Africa's match against the Barbarians in Cape Town.

=== International tries ===
As of 19 November 2021

Try	Opposing team	Location	Venue	Competition	Date	Result	Score
1	Argentina	Salta, Argentina	Estadio Padre Ernesto Martearena	2017 Rugby Championship	26 August 2017	Win	23 –41
2	New Zealand	Cape Town, South Africa	Newlands Stadium	2017 Rugby Championship	7 October 2017	Loss	24 – 25

== Honours ==
South Africa

- 2025 Rugby Championship winner
