= Luke James (rugby union) =

English rugby union player

- Born: Luke James; 18 March 1999 (age 27) Manchester, England
- Height: 1.93 m (6 ft 4 in)
- Weight: 95 kg (14 st 13 lb; 209 lb)
- Notable relative: Sam James (brother)

Rugby union career
- Position(s): Centre, Full-back
- Current team: Sale Sharks
Senior career
Years	Team	Apps	(Points)
2017–	Sale Sharks	155	(110)
International career
Years	Team	Apps	(Points)
2018–2019	England U20s	5	(5)

Luke James (born 18 March 1999) is an English rugby union player, currently playing with the Sale Sharks. He usually plays as an inside centre but has also played numerous times as a full-back and occasionally as an outside centre. He made his professional debut against Saracens 23 September 2017. Luke James gained his first cap on 11 May 2018 against the Junior Springboks at Sixways Stadium. A year later, James was called up to the U20's World Championship 2019 in which he gained a further 4 caps for England U20's.
