= Henry Taylor (rugby union, born 1994) =

English rugby union player

- Born: Henry William V. Taylor; 11 April 1994 (age 32) High Wycombe, Buckinghamshire, England
- Height: 1.80 m (5 ft 11 in)
- Weight: 86 kg (13 st 8 lb)
- School: Cranleigh School
- University: University of Loughborough

Rugby union career
- Position: Scrum-half
- Current team: Northampton
Senior career
Years	Team	Apps	(Points)
2014–2019	Saracens	4	(0)
2016	→ Coventry	0	(0)
2019–	Northampton Saints	6	(10)
- Correct as of 26 October 2019
International career
Years	Team	Apps	(Points)
2014–2015	England U20		

Henry Taylor (born 11 April 1994) is an English professional rugby union player who plays for Saracens as a Scrum-half. He will join Northampton Saints for the start of the 2019–20 season.

Taylor renewed his contract for an undisclosed length of time in January 2020. However, not long after this he announced his retirement from professional rugby on 26 July 2021, having made 33 appearances for Northampton Saints over two seasons. Taylor had previously won the under-20 world cup with England in 2014.
