= Tom Hardwick =

English rugby union player

- Born: Thomas Vivien Colin Hardwick; 24 March 1999 (age 27) Chertsey, Surrey
- Height: 5 ft 9 in (1.75 m)
- Weight: 14 st 13 lb (95 kg)
- School: Rugby School
- Notable relative: Rob Hardwick (Father)

Rugby union career
- Position: Fly-half
Senior career
Years	Team	Apps	(Points)
2017–2021	Leicester Tigers	32	(117)
2017–2018	Loughborough Students	4	(26)
2021–2022	Albi	3	
2017–	Total	39	(143)
- Correct as of 18 October 2020
International career
Years	Team	Apps	(Points)
2018	England U20	10	(52)

Thomas Vivien Colin Hardwick (born 24 March 1999) is an English professional rugby union player, currently unattached the last club he played for was SC Albi, who play in France's third national division of rugby union. He previously played 32 games for Leicester Tigers between 2017 and 2021. He usually plays fly half or centre.

== Early life and education ==
Hardwick's father is former England prop Rob Hardwick.

Hardwick played initially at Bedford Junior Blues and Olney RFC. He went to Bedford Modern School and sixth form at Rugby School, and represented England junior age groups.

== Rugby playing career ==
Hardwick made his debut for Leicester Tigers on 10 November 2017 in an Anglo-Welsh Cup match against Bath at the Rec, he scored 11 points as Leicester lost 33 – 31.

Hardwick was named in the England under 20s squad for the 2018 World Rugby Under 20 Championship. He scored a try in the semi-final win over South Africa, and played in the final, a 25 – 33 loss to France.

On 11 March 2021 he was released by Leicester. On 24 July 2021 his signing was announced by SC Albi, a club in France's Championnat Fédéral Nationale, the third division.

On 13 March 2022 he was released by SC Albi.
