= James Grayson (rugby union) =

English rugby union player

- Born: James Grayson; 26 June 1998 (age 28) Northampton, England
- Height: 1.87 m (6 ft 2 in)
- Weight: 90 kg (14 st 2 lb; 200 lb)
- School: Northampton School for Boys; Moulton College
- Notable relative: Paul Grayson (Father)

Rugby union career
- Position(s): Fly-half, Fullback
- Current team: Edinburgh Rugby
Senior career
| Years | Team | Apps | (Points) |
| 2016–2023 | Northampton Saints | 92 | (617) |
| 2023–2026 | Mitsubishi Dynaboars | 48 | (294) |
| 2026– | Edinburgh Rugby | 1 | (14) |
International career
| Years | Team | Apps | (Points) |
| 2017 | England U20 | 7 | (25) |

James Grayson (born 26 June 1998) is an English professional rugby union player currently signed for the Japan Rugby League One side Mitsubishi Dynaboars. He plays at fly-half.

== Background ==
Grayson began playing rugby at age 4 with Old Northamptonians where he spent 13 years working his way through the age groups. Educated at Northampton School for Boys and Moulton College, Grayson continued to play for club and school, captaining the Moulton team. Despite now playing at fly-half, his Northampton school master had him play at scrum half and full back, positions that Grayson admits he did not enjoy at the time but rounded his playing style.

His Dad is retired fly-half, Paul Grayson who won the 2003 Rugby World Cup with England Rugby and toured with the British and Irish Lions on their 1997 tour to South Africa. He played for Northampton Saints his entire professional career from 1993 to 2005.

== Club career ==
In June 2016 Northampton Saints confirmed that Grayson along with 5 others would make the step up from the junior academy to the senior academy, all awarded professional contracts for the 2016/17 season. He had been part of the junior academy since he was 13 years old.

During his first season, he helped Northampton Wanderers lift the A League trophy beating Gloucester United 36–15. Grayson continues to be a regular name in the Northampton developmental team where in the 2017/18 campaign they once again lifted the A-League trophy beating Exeter Braves 31-21 crowning them back to back champions.

The 2017/18 season saw Grayson given his first Premiership start against Sale Sharks, Northampton lost 18–15.

== International career ==
Grayson was selected for the England Saxons under-16s in 2014. The following two years saw him selected for England under-17s in 2015 and under-18s in 2016. Whilst playing with the under-18s his performance played a key part in their 41–9 win against Wales to win the 5 Nations Festival in 2016.

He made his England under-20s debut during their 2017 Six Nations campaign, the team beat Wales 21–37 with Grayson coming on as a replacement in the second half. He linked up with under-20s again later that year for the World Championships, England fought their way to the final losing to New Zealand 17–64.

Grayson turned out for every England under-20s fixture during the 2018 Six Nations campaign. The team were defending their grand slam victory from the previous year, they narrowly missed out on reclaiming the title with France ultimately winning the competition on points difference.
