= Lewis Boyce =

English rugby union footballer

- Born: Lewis Andrew Boyce; 30 July 1996 (age 30) Middlesbrough, England
- Height: 1.85 m (6 ft 1 in)
- Weight: 113 kg (17 st 11 lb)

Rugby union career
- Position: Loosehead Prop
Youth career
- Middlesbrough
- Yorkshire Carnegie
Senior career
Years	Team	Apps	(Points)
2014–2017	Yorkshire Carnegie	22	(15)
2017–2019	Harlequins	28	(10)
2019–2022	Bath	27	(10)
2022–2023	Ealing Trailfinders		
International career
Years	Team	Apps	(Points)
2016	England U20	7	(0)
- Correct as of 19 December 2023

Lewis Boyce (born 30 July 1996) is an English professional rugby union player, who plays as a loose-head prop for Premiership Rugby club Bath.

== Club career ==
Boyce made his debut for Yorkshire Carnegie against Rotherham in 2014 and made 22 appearances in the RFU Championship. Boyce was part of the side that were defeated by London Irish in the 2017 Championship play-off final.

On 14 March 2017 it was announced that Boyce would be joining Harlequins for the 2017–18 Aviva Premiership season. On 18 January 2019, Boyce signed for Premiership rivals Bath from the 2019–20 season.

== International career ==
In June 2016, Boyce started for the England U20 side that defeated Ireland in the final of the Junior World Cup. In January 2018 he was named in England's squad for the 2018 Six Nations Championship opener, against Italy.
