= Ali Crossdale =

English rugby union player (born 1998)

- Born: Alistair John Crossdale; 9 January 1998 (age 28) Halifax, England
- Height: 1.86 m (6 ft 1 in)
- Weight: 91 kg (14 st 5 lb)
- School: Altrincham Grammar School for Boys , Sedbergh School

Rugby union career
- Position: Wing
- Current team: Perpignan
Senior career
| Years | Team | Apps | (Points) |
| 2016–2021 | Saracens | 15 | (35) |
| 2021–2022 | Wasps | 18 | (15) |
| 2022– | Perpignan | 34 | (35) |
- Correct as of 11 March 2025

Ali Crossdale (born 9 January 1998) is an English professional rugby union player for USA Perpignan in the French Top 14.

On 26 January 2021 it was announced that Crossdale would be part of the shadow squad for England at the 2021 Six Nations Championship.
