= Ben Harris (rugby union, born 1989) =

- Born: Ben Harris; 28 April 1989 (age 37) Huddersfield, England
- Height: 1.93 m (6 ft 4 in)
- Weight: 126 kg (278 lb; 19 st 12 lb)
- School: All Saints Catholic High School

Rugby union career
- Position: Loosehead Prop
- Current team: Newcastle Falcons
Amateur team(s)
| Years | Team | Apps | (Points) |
- Huddersfield RUFC
Senior career
| Years | Team | Apps | (Points) |
| 2010–2012 | Rotherham Titans | | |
| 2012–2015 | Yorkshire Carnegie | 65 | (20) |
| 2015–2016 | Newcastle Falcons | 8 | (5) |
| 2016–2022 | Wasps | 1 | (0) |

Ben Harris (born 24 April 1989) is an English rugby union player. He also plays for the England national rugby sevens team. His playing position is loosehead prop.

Harris was born in Huddersfield, West Yorkshire, England.

Harris was initially part of Rotherham Titans set-up but he joined Yorkshire Carnegie on loan in 2012–13 season where he quickly established himself in the first team and made 22 appearances in total throughout the campaign and earned a permanent contract. He was one of the stars of the season, earning a number of Man of the Match accolades, and carved a reputation as one of the brightest young talents in the RFU Championship. He was in consistent form once again in 2013–14 season, but injury brought his season to an early end after 19 games. He made another 24 appearances in the 2014–15 season.

On 11 March 2015, Harris made his to move to Aviva Premiership side Newcastle Falcons on a two-year deal from the 2015–16 season. Originally Harris signed a short-term deal with Premiership rivals Wasps However, on 22 February 2017, Harris signed a permanent deal to stay with the Coventry-based club.

Wasps entered administration on 17 October 2022 and Harris was made redundant along with all other players and coaching staff.
