= Robert du Preez (rugby union, born 1963) =

South Africa international rugby union player

- Full name: Robert James du Preez
- Born: 19 July 1963 (age 63) Potchefstroom, South Africa
- Height: 1.82 m (5 ft 11 1/2 in)
- Weight: 85 kg (13 st 5 lb; 187 lb)
- School: Technical High, Potchefstroom
- University: University of Pretoria
- Notable relative(s): Robert du Preez (son), Dan du Preez (son), Jean-Luc du Preez (son)

Rugby union career
- Position: Scrum-half
International career
Years	Team	Apps	(Points)
1992–1993	South Africa	7	(0)
- Correct as of 31 October 2016
Coaching career
- Years: Team
- 2011–2013: College Rovers
- 2014–2015: Leopards
- 2016–2018: Sharks
- 2017–present: Sharks

Robert James du Preez (born 19 July 1963 in Potchefstroom) is a former South African international rugby union player and former head coach of the Sharks Super Rugby team. His regular position was scrum-half.

== Playing career ==
Du Preez started his provincial career with Western Transvaal in 1982. He then moved to Northern Transvaal, where his regular halfback partner was Naas Botha. He ended his playing career with Natal.

Du Preez played seven test matches for the Springboks in 1992 and 1993. He also played in eight tour matches, scoring nine tries for the Springboks.

=== Test history ===
No.	Opposition	Result (SA 1st)	Position	Tries	Date	Venue
1.	New Zealand	24–27	Scrumhalf		15 August 1992	Ellis Park, Johannesburg
2.	Australia	3–26	Scrumhalf		22 August 1992	Newlands, Cape Town
3.	France	20–20	Scrumhalf		26 June 1993	Kings Park Stadium, Durban
4.	France	17–18	Scrumhalf		3 July 1993	Ellis Park, Johannesburg
5.	Australia	19–12	Scrumhalf		31 July 1993	Sydney Football Stadium (SFG), Sydney
6.	Australia	20–28	Scrumhalf		14 August 1993	Ballymore Stadium, Brisbane
7.	Australia	12–19	Scrumhalf		21 August 1993	Sydney Football Stadium (SFG), Sydney

== Coaching career ==
He coached KwaZulu-Natal sides Crusaders (in 2010) and College Rovers (between 2011 and 2013) before returning to his home town of Potchefstroom to coach both provincial side the Leopards and university side NWU Pukke.

== Personal ==
Du Preez's eldest son – also called Robert – is a professional rugby player that played provincial rugby for Western Province and for the South Africa Under-20 side at the 2013 IRB Junior World Championship.

He also has two younger twin sons – Dan and Jean-Luc – that were both included in the South Africa Under-20 squad for the 2014 IRB Junior World Championship. All three sons were selected for the Sharks squad for the 2019 Super Rugby competition.

== Accolades ==
Du Preez was also a South African Rugby Young Player of the Year nominee in 1987 and a South African Rugby Player of the Year nominee in 1989 and 1990.

== See also ==
- List of South Africa national rugby union players – Springbok no. 562
