= Dom Morris =

English rugby union player

- Born: Dominic Patrick Morris; 29 July 1997 (age 29) Basildon, England
- Height: 1.80 m (5 ft 11 in)
- Weight: 90 kg (14 st; 200 lb)
- School: New Hall School

Rugby union career
- Position(s): Centre, Wing
Youth career
- 2012–2018: Saracens Academy
Senior career
Years	Team	Apps	(Points)
2015–2016	→ Bishop's Stortford (loan)		
2016–2017	→ Rosslyn Park (loan)		
2017–	Saracens	60	(65)
2017–2018	→ Ampthill (loan)		
2019	→ Bedford Blues (loan)	3	(0)
- Correct as of 8 January 2022
International career
Years	Team	Apps	(Points)
- England U18
2017	England U20	5	(15)
- Correct as of 4 June 2017

Dom Morris (born 29 July 1997) is an English professional rugby union player who plays as a centre for Saracens in the Gallagher Premiership.

== Club career ==
Born in Basildon, Morris attended New Hall School, where his performances caught the attention of Saracens. A boyhood fan of the club, Morris joined Saracen's academy when he was 15, following in the footsteps of his older brothers Vincent and Oli. Morris joined Bishop's Stortford on loan during the 2015–16 season, where he gained his first experience playing senior men's rugby, and joined Rosslyn Park on loan during the 2016–17 season, making his senior competitive debut for Saracens in their Anglo-Welsh Cup fixture against Scarlets on 27 January 2017.

Morris' progress was rewarded with a contract extension announced in November 2017. He gained further experience on dual-registration with Ampthill and Bedford Blues, and played a key role during the 2018–19 Premiership Rugby Cup, in which Saracens were runners-up, and during the 2018–19 Premiership Rugby Shield, which Saracens Storm won. Morris made his Premiership debut for the club away to Wasps on 27 April 2019, and, in a match that was his first home premiership appearance, he scored two tries in a 38–7 win against Exeter Chiefs on 4 May 2019.

Morris has spoken about his difficulties with injuries, which have disrupted his career. He signed a new two-year contract with Saracens in July 2020, and extended that deal for an undisclosed length of time in January 2022.

== International career ==
Having previously represented England at under-16 and under-18 level, Morris missed out on playing for England under-20s at the 2016 World Rugby Under 20 Championship due to injury, but he returned to the team to play in four out of five matches in their victorious 2017 Six Nations Under 20s Championship campaign. Later that year he was selected to compete at the 2017 World Rugby Under 20 Championship and scored two tries in their opening game against Samoa as England eventually finished runners up to New Zealand.

Morris is Irish-qualified through his grandmother.
