= Jacques Vermeulen =

South African rugby union player

- Full name: Johannes Frederick Vermeulen
- Born: 8 February 1995 (age 31) Paarl, South Africa
- Height: 1.97 m (6 ft 5 1/2 in)
- Weight: 113 kg (17 st 11 lb; 249 lb)
- School: Paarl Gimnasium

Rugby union career
- Position: Flanker
- Current team: Sale Sharks
Youth career
- 2008–2015: Western Province
Senior career
Years	Team	Apps	(Points)
2015–2016	Western Province	12	(10)
2017–2019	Sharks	38	(15)
2017–2018	Sharks XV	5	(25)
2017–2019	Sharks (Currie Cup)	25	(20)
2019–2025	Exeter Chiefs	73	(140)
2025–	Sale Sharks	0	(0)
- Correct as of 21 January 2024
International career
Years	Team	Apps	(Points)
2013	South Africa Schools	3	(0)
2014–2015	South Africa U20s	7	(5)
- Correct as of 22 June 2015

Johannes Frederick 'Jacques' Vermeulen (born 8 February 1995) is a South African rugby union player for English club Sale Sharks. His regular position is flanker but he can also play as a number 8.

== Career ==
Vermeulen represented Western Province from as early as primary school level, when he played at the Under-13 Craven Week competition in 2008. In 2011, he was included in their Under-16 squad that played at the Grant Khomo week before playing in the premier high school rugby union competition in South Africa, the Under-18 Craven Week in both 2012 and 2013, starting all three of their matches in both competitions and scoring one try in their 2013 match against the Golden Lions.

After the 2013 competition, Vermeulen was included in the South African Schools side. He started their matches against England and Wales and played off the bench against France, helping South Africa to victories in all three matches.

Despite not initially being included in the South Africa Under-20 squad for the 2014 IRB Junior World Championship, an injury to Dan du Preez led to Vermeulen being called up. He started their 61–5 victory over Scotland in their opening match of the competition, but didn't feature in their next match against hosts New Zealand, where South Africa achieved a 33–24 win. He returned to the starting line-up for their final pool match against Samoa and also started their 32–25 victory against New Zealand in the semi-final. He made his fourth start of the competition in the final against England, but could not prevent South Africa from losing the match 20–21 to finish the competition as runners-up.

Vermeulen returned to domestic action to represent the Western Province U21s in the 2014 Under-21 Provincial Championship, despite still being eligible for their Under=19 side. He started five of their matches in the competition, with the side making it all the way to the final of the competition before losing 10–20 to the Blue Bulls U21s.

Vermeulen was included in the Western Province squad for the 2015 Vodacom Cup competition. He made his domestic first class debut on 21 March 2015, starting their match against the Boland Cavaliers in Caledon and helping them to a 25–10 victory. He also started their matches against the Sharks XV, the Eastern Province Kings and Griquas.

Vermeulen was named in a 37-man training squad for the South Africa national under-20 rugby union team and subsequently included in the squad that embarked on a two-match tour of Argentina. He started their 25–22 victory over Argentina in the first match, but didn't feature in their 39–28 victory a few days later.

Upon the team's return, Vermeulen was named in the final squad for the 2015 World Rugby Under 20 Championship. He didn't play in the first of their three matches in Pool B of the competition, a 33–5 win against hosts Italy, but came on as a replacement in their 40–8 win against Samoa in the second match. He started their final group match against Australia, scoring a try in the second minute of the match to help South Africa to a 46–13 win which saw South Africa finish top of Pool B to qualify for the semi-finals with the best record pool stage of all the teams in the competition. Vermeulen didn't feature in their semi-final match against England, which saw them lose 20–28 to be eliminated from the competition by England for the second year in succession but he did start their third-place play-off match against France, helping South Africa to a 31–18 win to secure third place in the competition.

On 24 March 2025, after six seasons at Exeter, it would confirmed that Vermeulen would depart for Premiership rivals Sale Sharks from the 2025-26 season.
