= Ruan Botha =

South African rugby union player

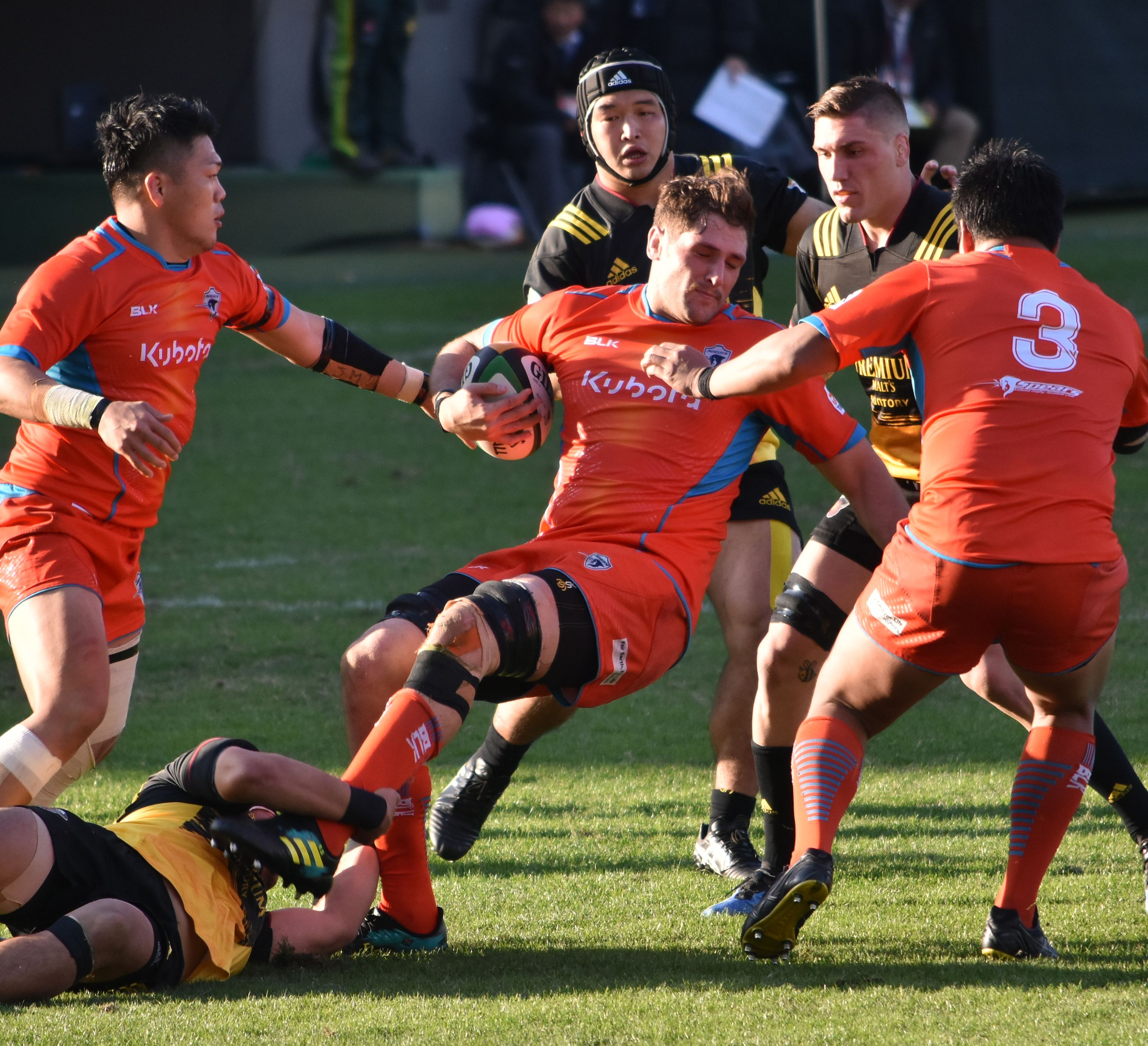
- Born: 10 January 1992 (age 34) Brakpan, South Africa
- Height: 2.05 m (6 ft 8 1/2 in)
- Weight: 124 kg (19 st 7 lb; 273 lb)
- School: Jeugland Hoërskool

Rugby union career
- Position: Lock
- Current team: Kubota Spears
Youth career
- 2010: Falcons
- 2011–2012: Golden Lions
Senior career
Years	Team	Apps	(Points)
2012	Golden Lions XV	1	(0)
2012	Lions	5	(0)
2013–2015	Western Province	19	(5)
2014–2015	Stormers	21	(5)
2016	Sharks XV	4	(5)
2016–2019	Sharks	42	(20)
2016–2017	Sharks (Currie Cup)	21	(15)
2018–present	Kubota Spears	70	(50)
2019–2020	London Irish	9	(10)
- Correct as of 21 February 2021
International career
Years	Team	Apps	(Points)
2012	South Africa U20	5	(0)
2017	South Africa 'A'	2	(0)
2026–	Japan	2	(0)
- Correct as of 6 April 2018

Ruan Botha (born 10 January 1992) is a South African rugby union player. He plays as a lock for Kubota Spears in the Japanese Top League. He made his provincial debut on 31 March 2012 as the Golden Lions thrashed the Griffons 71–25 in Johannesburg. Botha started the match before being replaced in the 62nd minute by Hendrik Roodt.

His first call-up to the Lions Super Rugby team came ahead of the side's Australian tour during the 2012 Super Rugby season. He made the starting fifteen for the first time in the match against the Chiefs in Pukekohe on 5 May 2012.

Botha was named in the South Africa Under 20 team that won the 2012 IRB Junior World Championship.

He joined Western Province for the 2013 season.

In May 2019, following three years with Sharks he signed for English Premiership Rugby side London Irish on an initial 6 month contract. He was due to return to Irish following the 2019–20 Top League season in Japan which he would spend with Kubota Spears. However, in July 2020 London Irish confirmed he would not be returning.
