= Dan du Preez =

South African international rugby union player (born 1995)

- Full name: Daniel du Preez
- Born: 5 August 1995 (age 31) Durban, South Africa
- Height: 1.96 m (6 ft 5 in)
- Weight: 112 kg (17 st 9 lb; 247 lb)
- School: Kearsney College, KwaZulu-Natal
- University: Varsity College, Westville
- Notable relative(s): Robert du Preez (father), Robert du Preez (brother), Jean-Luc du Preez (brother)

Rugby union career
- Position: Loose forward / Lock
- Current team: Bath
Youth career
- 2008–2015: Sharks
Senior career
Years	Team	Apps	(Points)
2015–2019	Sharks	53	(75)
2015–2017	Sharks XV	4	(10)
2015–2018	Sharks (Currie Cup)	19	(45)
2019–2026	Sale Sharks	125	(125)
2026–	Bath	0	(0)
- Correct as of 3 August 2026
International career
Years	Team	Apps	(Points)
2012–2013	South Africa Schools	4	(0)
2015	South Africa Under-20	5	(10)
2017–	South Africa	7	(0)
- Correct as of 26 August 2021

Daniel du Preez (born 5 August 1995) is a South African rugby union player for Bath in the English Premiership. His usual position is number eight, but he can also play as a lock or flanker.

== Career ==
=== Youth ===
Du Preez was selected in a number of KwaZulu-Natal youth squads whilst still at school. At primary school level, he was selected for their squad that played at the 2008 Under-13 Craven Week competition. He also played in the premier schools competition in South Africa – the Under-18 Craven Week in three different seasons; he made two appearances at the 2011 event in Kimberley, three appearances at the 2012 event in Port Elizabeth – scoring a try in their match against the Free State – and a further three appearances in 2013, scoring a try against Border.

In both 2012 and 2013, Du Preez was selected to represent a South African Schools team. In 2012, he played in their matches against France and Wales and in 2013 he made appearances against England and Wales.

He recovered from an injury that kept him out of the 2014 IRB Junior World Championship to play a key part in the Sharks U19 side that played in the 2014 Under-19 Provincial Championship, making eleven appearances and scoring tries in their matches against Eastern Province U19 and Free State U19 to help them qualify for the semi-finals, where they lost 20–43 to the Blue Bulls U19.

=== Sharks ===
In 2015, despite not having featured at senior provincial level for the Sharks, Du Preez was included on the bench for the Sharks' Round Five Super Rugby match against the Cheetahs. He made his Super Rugby debut in the Sharks' 27–10 victory, coming on for the final ten minutes of the match.

=== South Africa Under-20 ===
In 2014, he was selected in the South Africa Under-20 squad to play at the 2014 IRB Junior World Championship, but an injury ruled him out of the competition and was replaced by Jacques Vermeulen.

In March 2015, Du Preez was named in an extended South Africa Under-20 training group as part of their preparation for the 2015 World Rugby Under 20 Championship. He featured for them in a friendly match against a Varsity Cup Dream Team in April 2015. In May 2015, he was included in the South Africa Under-20 squad that toured Argentina. He started both of their tour matches, scoring a try in the 25–22 victory in the first encounter and was then included in the final squad for the 2015 World Rugby Under 20 Championship.

He played off the bench in the first of their three matches in Pool B of the competition, a 33–5 win against hosts Italy, started their 40–8 win against Samoa and again came on as a replacement in their 46–13 win over Australia to help South Africa finish top of Pool B to qualify for the semi-finals with the best record pool stage of all the teams in the competition. Du Preez came on in the second half of their semi-final match against England, but could not prevent them losing 20–28 to be eliminated from the competition by England for the second year in succession and started their third-place play-off match against France, scoring two tries in the match to help South Africa to a 31–18 win to secure third place in the competition.

== Personal ==
Du Preez's father Robert is a former Springbok scrum-half that made seven appearances for South Africa between 1992 and 1993.

He has an older brother – also called Robert – and a twin brother Jean-Luc. Both of them also represented the South Africa Under-20 side at the IRB Junior World Championship, in 2013 and 2014 respectively.

== Honours ==
South Africa

- 2025 Rugby Championship winner
