= Robert du Preez (rugby union, born 1993) =

South Africa international rugby union player

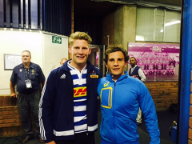
- Full name: Robert James du Preez
- Born: 30 July 1993 (age 33) Durban, South Africa
- Height: 1.92 m (6 ft 3 1/2 in)
- Weight: 96 kg (15 st 2 lb; 212 lb)
- School: Kearsney College, KwaZulu-Natal
- Notable relative(s): Robert du Preez (father), Dan du Preez (brother), Jean-Luc du Preez (brother)

Rugby union career
- Position: Fly-half / Centre / Fullback
- Current team: Sale Sharks
Youth career
- 2006–2013: Sharks
Amateur team(s)
Years	Team	Apps	(Points)
2014	Maties	8	(84)
Senior career
Years	Team	Apps	(Points)
2014–2017	Western Province	43	(376)
2015–2017	Stormers	14	(107)
2018–2019	Sharks	34	(287)
2018	Sharks (Currie Cup)	8	(65)
2018–	Sale Sharks	158	(876)
- Correct as of 19 May 2025
International career
Years	Team	Apps	(Points)
2013	South Africa Under-20	4	(28)
2016–2017	Barbarians	5	(31)
2018	South Africa	1	(3)
- Correct as of 3 June 2018

Robert James du Preez (born 30 July 1993, in Durban) is a South African professional rugby union player for English Premiership side Sale Sharks. His regular position is fly-half.

== Career ==
=== Early career ===
Du Preez represented the Sharks at the Under-13 Craven Week tournament in 2006 and at the Under-18 Craven Week tournament in 2011 before joining the Sharks Academy. He played for the Sharks U19 side in 2011 and 2012. In the 2012 competition, Du Preez was the top points scorer in the competition scoring seven tries, thirty conversions and fifteen penalties for a total of 140 points.

In 2013, Du Preez was included in the South Africa Under-20 squad for the 2013 IRB Junior World Championship. He started the pool matches against the United States (kicking six conversions) and England (scoring two conversions and four penalties). He was an unused substitute in their final pool match against hosts France, but returned to the starting line-up for their semi-final match against Wales and came on as a substitute in the third-placed play-off against New Zealand.

Upon his return to domestic action, he weighed in with 108 points for the Sharks U21 side during the 2013 Under-21 Provincial Championship competition to finish third in the top scorers list.

In 2014, he moved to Stellenbosch to join Maties on loan for their 2014 Varsity Cup campaign. He once again topped the scoring charts, scoring 84 points during Maties' run to the semi-final of the competition. He was also named the "Player that Rocks" for the tournament.

Instead of returning to Durban at the conclusion of the 2014 Varsity Cup, Du Preez decided to remain in the Western Cape, signing a contract with Western Province until 2016.

He was included in their senior squad straight away and made his first class debut in the 2014 Vodacom Cup match against the Free State XV, also scoring a try to help his side to a 28–15 victory.

=== 2018 season ===
Du Preez moved from the Stormers to the Sharks for the 2018 Super Rugby season to join his family. He had a breakout season in 2018, becoming a regular starter for his new team almost immediately, displacing Curwin Bosch from his place at fly-half, causing Bosch to move to fullback. On 31 March 2018, Du Preez scored 38 points, including a try against the Blues at Eden Park in Auckland, allowing the Sharks to beat the Blues 63–40.

He was named by the new South African head coach Rassie Erasmus as one of 17 uncapped players in the 43–man Springbok squad for the 2018 June internationals. Du Preez's two younger brothers were also named in the squad, with Robert, Jean-Luc and Dan Du Preez making history as the first set of three siblings to be named in a Springbok squad together.

== Personal ==
Du Preez's father – also called Robert – is a former Springbok scrum-half that made seven appearances for South Africa between 1992 and 1993.

He also has two younger twin brothers – Dan and Jean-Luc – that were both included in the South Africa Under-20 squad for the 2014 IRB Junior World Championship. Du Preez's younger brothers are currently his teammates in the Sharks.

He attended Catholic University school in 2009 on an exchange programme.
