= Chandler Cunningham-South =

English rugby union player

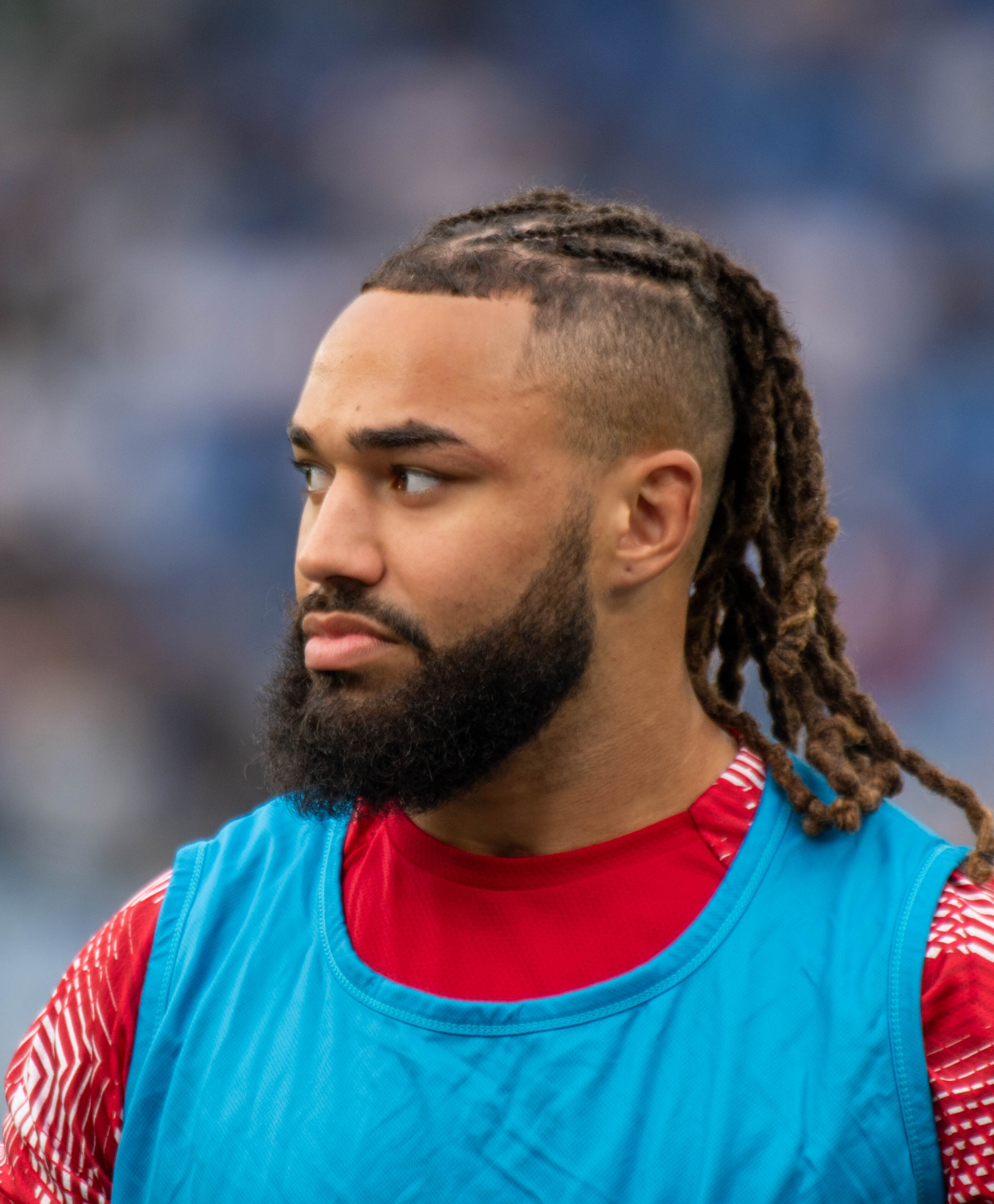
- Cunningham-South with England in 2026
- Born: 18 March 2003 (age 23) Sidcup, Greater London, England
- Height: 1.96 m (6 ft 5 in)
- Weight: 120 kg (265 lb; 18 st 13 lb)
- School: Hamilton Boys' High School; Westlake Boys High School
- University: Lincoln University

Rugby union career
- Position(s): Lock, Flanker, Number 8
- Current team: Harlequins
Senior career
Years	Team	Apps	(Points)
2022–2023	London Irish	25	(15)
2023–	Harlequins	53	(45)
- Correct as of 22 October 2026
International career
Years	Team	Apps	(Points)
2022–2023	England U20	15	(15)
2024–	England	23	(25)
- Correct as of 9 September 2026

Chandler Cunningham-South (born 18 March 2003) is an English professional rugby union player who plays as a back row for Premiership Rugby club Harlequins and the England national team.

== Early life ==
Cunningham-South was born in Sidcup in the London Borough of Bexley. At 4-years-old his family emigrated to New Zealand. His family have a farm holding in Wellsford, north of Auckland. His father, Richard, once coached him for Silverdale RFC. He did most of his ground work at Hamilton Boys' High School and attended Westlake Boys High School.

Cunningham-South played for the North Harbour under-18s, Canterbury under-19s and Lincoln University in Christchurch, and trained with New Zealand Warriors rugby league team.

== Club career ==
=== London Irish ===
In February 2022 Cunningham-South joined the London Irish academy. He made his senior club debut in May 2022 and went on to make nineteen Premiership appearances during the 2022–2023 season, scoring three tries. In the summer of 2023 London Irish encountered financial issues and in June 2023 it was confirmed that Cunningham-South would leave for Harlequins.

=== Harlequins ===
In April 2024, Cunningham-South put in a standout performance in Harlequins 42–41 defeat of Bordeaux Bègles. It was only the second time overall and the first time away that the club had won a knockout stage game in the European Champions Cup. He also started in their eventual elimination against Toulouse as they reached the semi-final stage for the first time in their history. At the end of that season in May 2024, Cunningham-South was nominated for the Premiership Rugby Breakthrough Player of the Season Award.

In January 2025, he scored his first try of the season and won player of the match in a 24–7 win over Glasgow Warriors to help his club secure a place in the knockout stages of the 2024–25 Champions Cup.

== International career ==
Cunningham-South represented England U20 during the 2022 Under-20 Six Nations. The following year saw him score a try in the opening round of the 2023 tournament victory over Scotland. He was a member of the squad that recorded a fourth-place finish at the 2023 World Rugby U20 Championship and scored a try in the semi-final defeat against France.

Cunningham-South received his first call-up to the senior England squad for the 2024 Six Nations Championship. On 3 February 2024 he made his Test debut coming off the bench as a second-half replacement for Sam Underhill in the opening round of the tournament against Italy at Stadio Olimpico.

Cunningham-South was selected for their 2024 summer tour and scored his first try at senior international level on his first Test start against Japan on 22 June 2024, the opening try of the match in a 52–17 win. Later that year in November 2024 he scored twice in a loss against Australia during the 2024 Autumn nations series.

In March 2025, he played his first game for England at lock, coming off the bench to replace Ollie Chessum in the final round of the 2025 Six Nations against Wales. He went on to score two tries during the match in a 68–14 victory at the Millennium Stadium.

=== List of international tries ===
as of 24 November 2025.

No.	Date	Venue	Opponent	Score	Result	Competition	Ref.
1	22 June 2024	Japan National Stadium, Tokyo, Japan	Japan	5–3	52–17	2024 England tour of New Zealand	
2	9 November 2024	Twickenham Stadium, London, England	Australia	5–0	37–42	2024 Autumn Internationals	
3	9 November 2024	Twickenham Stadium, London, England	Australia	10–3	37–42	2024 Autumn Internationals	
4	15 March 2025	Millennium Stadium, Cardiff, Wales	Wales	26–7	68–14	2025 Six Nations Championship	
5	15 March 2025	Millennium Stadium, Cardiff, Wales	Wales	66–14	68–14	2025 Six Nations Championship	
