= Toby Allchurch =

English rugby union player

- Born: Toby James Allchurch; 1958 (age 67–68) Karachi, Pakistan

Rugby union career
- Position: Flanker
International career
Years	Team	Apps	(Points)
1979	England	1	(4)

Toby James Allchurch (born 1958 in Karachi) is an English former rugby union player.

From Redditch, Allchurch matriculated at Hatfield College, Durham in 1977 to read for a degree in General Arts, but was promoted to the honours course in Politics and Sociology. He graduated in 1980.

Allchurch was selected to represent England for the 1979 tour of Japan, Fiji and Tonga. He was named to the bench for the second match against Japan and made his England debut as a flanker against Tonga in the final match of the tour, scoring one try. The match was not recognised as a full international at the time.

After graduating from Durham, Allchurch read Land Economy at Downing College, Cambridge, where he played for Cambridge University R.U.F.C.. He later captained Rosslyn Park.

In 2026, Allchurch was among 47 uncapped players to be retrospectively awarded caps by the Rugby Football Union (RFU) when the eligibility criteria was altered to reflect historical matches where the "best available England men’s team" had competed against another nation’s "full or best-available" XV. His appearance against Tonga benefited from the revised criteria.
