= Bob Mordell =

England international union and rugby league footballer

Personal information
- Full name: Robert John Mordell
- Born: 2 July 1953 (age 71); Twickenham, London, England
- Height: 6 ft 2 in (1.88 m)
- Weight: 15 st 0 lb (95 kg)

Playing information

Rugby union
- Position: Flanker
Club
Years	Team	Pld	T	G	FG	P
	Rosslyn Park
Representative
Years	Team	Pld	T	G	FG	P
1978	England	1	0	0	0	0

Rugby league
- Position: Second-row
Club
Years	Team	Pld	T	G	FG	P
1979–83	Oldham	73	10	0	0	30
1983–84	Kent Invicta
1985–??	Fulham RLFC
	Total	73	10	0	0	30

Coaching information
Club
Years	Team	Gms	W	D	L	W%
1983–84	Kent Invicta	0	0	0	0
- Source: As of 19 May 2017

Bob Mordell (born 2 July 1953) is an English former professional rugby union and rugby league footballer, and also a manager. He played rugby league as a professional for Oldham, Kent Invicta and Fulham RLFC. He played as a second-row. He was the manager at Kent Invicta. He represented England in rugby union on one occasion. At club level his played his rugby union for Wasps FC, including their tour to Kenya in 1973, and Rosslyn Park, and represented Middlesex at county level. He played as a flanker.

== Rugby union ==
He played his early rugby for the Thamesians club.

Mordell played rugby union for Rosslyn Park during the 1970s, and was in the Middlesex team that won the County Championship in 1976.

He played international rugby union for England, with his sole appearance coming against Wales in the opening match of the 1978 Five Nations. Mordell went on the 1979 tour of Japan with England but did not feature in the test matches.

== Rugby league ==
Mordell signed professional terms with Oldham in 1979. Whilst at Oldham he had his jaw broken by fellow rugby union convert Paul Woods.

Mordell signed for Kent Invicta before their début season in 1983 for £13,500. The well-respected attacking forward was named as captain of the fledgling Kent outfit.
