= Tommy Freeman (rugby union) =

English rugby union player (born 2001)

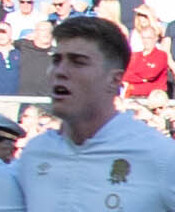
- Freeman in 2024
- Full name: Thomas William Freeman
- Born: 5 March 2001 (age 25) Oxford, England
- Height: 1.91 m (6 ft 3 in)
- Weight: 103 kg (227 lb; 16 st 3 lb)
- School: Culford School; Moulton College

Rugby union career
- Position(s): Wing, Centre, Full-back
- Current team: Northampton Saints
Senior career
Years	Team	Apps	(Points)
2019–	Northampton Saints	124	(420)
- Correct as of 10 November 2026
International career
Years	Team	Apps	(Points)
2022–	England	32	(55)
2025	British & Irish Lions	3	(0)
- Correct as of 10 November 2026

Thomas William Freeman (born 5 March 2001) is an English professional rugby union player who plays as a wing for Prem Rugby club Northampton Saints and England national team.

== Club career ==
Freeman was released by the Leicester Tigers academy at the age of sixteen. In 2018 he joined Northampton Saints and the following year made his club debut in a Premiership Rugby Cup match against Sale Sharks.

Freeman scored a try in the 2023–24 European Rugby Champions Cup round of sixteen victory over Munster and also started in their semi-final elimination against Leinster. At the end of that season he scored the opening try of the 2023–24 Premiership Rugby final as Northampton defeated Bath to become League champions.

In April 2025, Freeman scored a hat-trick in the Champions Cup Round of 16, winning man of the match in 46–24 victory over Clermont Auvergne. He scored again in the following match, a 51–16 victory over Castres in the quarter finals. He was rested for their following fixture against Newcastle Falcons before returning to the starting lineup to score another two tries, taking his personal tally to six tries in three games, during a 48–31 victory over Bristol Bears. In May 2025, he scored a first-half hat-trick and won man of the match during 37–34 victory over Leinster in the Champions Cup semi finals. He started in the 2025 European Rugby Champions Cup final which Northampton lost against Bordeaux Bègles.

In October 2025, Freeman scored four tries in a 43–31 victory against Saracens. In December 2025, he scored a hat-trick in a 41–21 victory away against Bath. In April 2026, he scored another hat-trick against Bath during a 41–38 victory at home. At the end of that season Freeman scored a try in the 2026 Prem final as Northampton defeated Exeter Chiefs to become champions again.

In September 2026, he scored a hat-trick in the Prem against Newcastle Red Bulls. In October 2026, he scored another two tries against Bath, during a 71–48 victory, the second highest scoring Prem fixture ever to that point.

== International career ==
=== England ===
In October 2021, Freeman received his first call-up to the senior England squad by coach Eddie Jones for the 2021 Autumn Internationals. Freeman was also a member of their 2022 tour of Australia and on 9 July 2022 made his debut starting in the second test victory at Lang Park. He retained his place for the last match of the tour as England defeated the Wallabies at Sydney Cricket Ground to win the series.

Having not played for England since November 2022 against South Africa, a game where Freeman was substituted at half time, he returned to the squad for the 2024 Six Nations Championship after a call-up by coach Steve Borthwick. He started in their opening round victory away to Italy and then scored his first try at international level in a loss to France during the last game of the tournament.

In February 2025, Freeman scored his second try in two games for the 2025 Six Nations during a 26–25 victory over France. In the following fixture, he scored a try against Scotland during a 16–15 victory to help England to win the Calcutta Cup for the first time since 2020. Despite the try standing, no camera angles appeared to confirm he had grounded the ball. He scored a try in the last round against Wales during a 68–14 victory at the Millennium Stadium. This meant he became the first English player in the history of the tournament to a score a try in each round of a Six Nations campaign.

In 2026, Freeman was named in the top 20 worlds best rugby players.

=== British & Irish Lions ===
In May 2025, Freeman was selected for the 2025 British & Irish Lions tour to Australia. He scored two tries in a tour match against Queensland Reds. Freeman started all three tests as the Lions won the series 2-1.

=== International tries ===
as of 18 July 2026

Try	Opposing team	Location	Venue	Competition	Date	Result	
1	France	Lyon, France	Parc Olympique Lyonnais	2024 Six Nations	16 March 2024	Lost	33 - 31
2	New Zealand	Auckland, New Zealand	Eden Park	2024 tour of New Zealand	13 July 2024	Lost	24 - 17
3	Ireland	Dublin, Ireland	Aviva Stadium	2025 Six Nations	1 February 2025	Lost	27 - 22
4	France	London, England	Twickenham Stadium	2025 Six Nations	8 February 2025	Won	26 - 25
5	Scotland	London, England	Twickenham Stadium	2025 Six Nations	22 February 2025	Won	16 - 15
6	Italy	London, England	Twickenham Stadium	2025 Six Nations	9 March 2025	Won	47 - 24
7	Wales	Cardiff, Wales	Millennium Stadium	2025 Six Nations	15 March 2025	Won	14 - 68
8	Wales	London, England	Twickenham Stadium	2026 Six Nations	7 February 2026	Won	48 - 7
9	Italy	Rome, Italy	Stadio Olimpico	2026 Six Nations	7 March 2026	Lost	23 - 18
10	France	Paris, France	Stade de France	2026 Six Nations	14 March 2026	Lost	48 - 46
11	Argentina	Santiago del Estero, Argentina	Estadio Único Madre de Ciudades	2026 Nations Championship	18 July 2026	Won	24 - 31

== Honours ==
Northampton

- Premiership Rugby: 2023–2024, 2025–2026
- European Rugby Champions Cup runner-up: 2024–25
