= Corpus Christi Roman Catholic High School, Cardiff =

Secondary school in Cardiff, Wales

Coordinates: 51.534°N 3.161°W

Corpus Christi RC High School
- Ysgol Uchwradd Corpus Christi
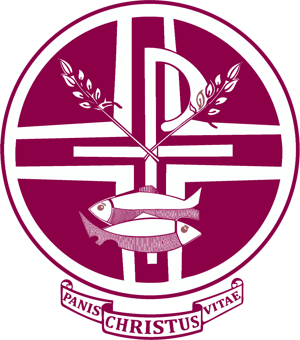

Location
- Corpus Christi High School; Ty Draw Road; Lisvane, Cardiff; CF23 6XL; Cardiff; Wales

Information
- Type: State (voluntary aided) secondary
- Motto: Together we are the body of Christ
- Religious affiliation: Roman Catholic
- Established: 1987
- Head teacher: Patrick Brunnock
- Years offered: 7-11
- Gender: Co-Educational
- Age: 11 to 16
- Enrollment: 1042
- Colours: purple and gold
- Nickname: Corpus
- Feeder schools: Christ the King Primary, Holy Family Primary, St. Bernadette's Primary, St. Joseph's Primary, St. Peter's Primary, St. Philip Evans' Primary
- Website: https://www.corpuschristihs.co.uk/

Corpus Christi Roman Catholic High School (formerly Lady Mary, Welsh: Ysgol Uwchradd Corpus Christi) is a voluntary aided Roman Catholic secondary school located in Lisvane, Cardiff, Wales. The school is co-educational and accepts children aged 11–16. Corpus Christi has traditionally performed well, with consistently good and above-average performance shown during inspections.

== History ==
Corpus Christi was founded in 1987, having originally been called Lady Mary High School. The school moved from Cyncoed Road to the current purpose-built school in 1995 following the old building becoming structurally unsound.

Lady Mary High School originally included its own Sixth Form college. However, the school does not have a sixth form so pupils go to St. David's Catholic College for further education and for some vocational courses at GCSE.

== Structure ==
=== Size ===
In 2015, there were 1042 students enrolled at the school, a slight increase on previous years. Most students come from one of six feeder primary schools in the wider Cardiff area, and the school can accept up to 215 students for each year group. The school is regularly oversubscribed, with places difficult to get for new Year 7 students, particularly for students not from one of the feeder schools.

== Alumni ==
- Peter Baynham - screenwriter and performer
- Callum Sheedy - professional rugby union player, Cardiff Rugby
- Jamie Miller - Singer and Performer
- Immanuel Feyi-Waboso - professional rugby union player, Exeter Chiefs
- Rhys Carré - professional rugby union player, Saracens
