= Lynn Hopkins =

Personal information
- Full name: Lynn Hopkins
- Born: unknown Crynant, Neath Port Talbot, Wales

Playing information
- Position: Fullback
Club
Years	Team	Pld	T	G	FG	P
1979–84	Workington Town	99	44	365	4	872
1984–≥84	Kent Invicta					140
	Total	99	44	365	4	1012
Representative
Years	Team	Pld	T	G	FG	P
	Cumbria
1982	Wales	1	0	0	1	2

Lynn Hopkins (birth unknown) is a Welsh former professional rugby league footballer who played in the 1970s and 1980s. He played at representative level for Wales and Cumbria, and at club level for Workington Town and Kent Invicta, as a fullback.

== Playing career ==
=== International honours ===
Lynn Hopkins won a cap for Wales while at Workington Town in the 7-37 defeat by Australia at Ninian Park, Cardiff on Sunday 24 October 1982.

=== County honours ===
Lynn Hopkins represented Cumbria.

=== Career Records ===
Lynn Hopkins holds Workington Town's record for the most goals in a season (186 in 1981/82), and the most points in a season (438 in 1981/82). He is one of less than twenty-five Welshmen to have scored more than 1000-points in their rugby league career.
