= 2024 England rugby union tour of New Zealand =

- Coach: Steve Borthwick
- Tour captain: Jamie George
- Top test point scorer: Marcus Smith (20)
- Top test try scorer: Immanuel Feyi-Waboso (3)
Summary
P	W	D	L
Total
3	1	0	2
Test match
3	1	0	2
Opponent
P	W	D	L
New Zealand
2	0	0	2
Japan
1	1	0	0

Tour chronology
- ← Australia 2022

In July 2024, the England rugby union team toured New Zealand, where they played two tests against the New Zealand national team, a part of the 2024 Summer Internationals. On the way to New Zealand, England also played a match against Japan at the Japan National Stadium in Tokyo.

The tour was first reported by The Times in December 2022, shortly after England coach Eddie Jones was sacked and replaced by Steve Borthwick by the Rugby Football Union (RFU). Although Southern Hemisphere tours have typically been played on a three-test basis, as in the 2014 tour; the 2016 and 2022 tours of Australia; and the 2018 tour of South Africa, all Northern Hemisphere touring teams (with Scotland being an exception) returned to two-tests.

The tour was England's first since touring Australia in 2022, and their first tour of New Zealand since 2014. It was Steve Borthwick's first tour as coach of England. Borthwick was previously the England captain when they toured New Zealand in 2008, losing the series 2–0. It was also the first set of fixtures for New Zealand's new coach, Scott Robertson.

== Fixtures ==
Date	Venue	Home	Score	Away	Source
22 June 2024	Japan National Stadium, Tokyo	Japan	17–52	England	Report
6 July 2024	Forsyth Barr Stadium, Dunedin	New Zealand	16–15	England	Report
13 July 2024	Eden Park, Auckland	New Zealand	24–17	England	Report

== Squads ==
=== England ===
England named a 36-player touring squad on 10 June 2024.

^{(1)} On 23 June 2024, Charlie Ewels was ruled out of the tests against New Zealand, after receiving a red card against Japan, which resulted in a two-match suspension. He was replaced in the England squad by Nick Isiekwe.

^{(2)} On 7 July 2024, Joe Marler was ruled out of the second test against New Zealand, after sustaining a foot injury during the first test match a day earlier. He was replaced in the England squad by Emmanuel Iyogun.

Note: Ages, caps and clubs are as of 22 June 2024, the day of England's first test match of the summer series.

Player	Position	Date of birth (age)	Caps	Club/province
Theo Dan	Hooker	26 December 2000 (aged 23)	12	(England) Saracens
Jamie George (c)	Hooker	20 October 1990 (aged 33)	90	(England) Saracens
Gabriel Oghre	Hooker	25 May 1998 (aged 26)	0	(England) Bristol Bears
Fin Baxter	Prop	12 February 2002 (aged 22)	0	(England) Harlequins
Dan Cole	Prop	9 May 1987 (aged 37)	112	(England) Leicester Tigers
Joe Heyes	Prop	13 April 1999 (aged 25)	7	(England) Leicester Tigers
Emmanuel Iyogun ^{(2)}	Prop	24 November 2000 (aged 23)	0	(England) Northampton Saints
Joe Marler (vc) ^{(2)}	Prop	7 July 1990 (aged 33)	92	(England) Harlequins
Bevan Rodd	Prop	26 August 2000 (aged 23)	5	(England) Sale Sharks
Will Stuart	Prop	12 July 1996 (aged 27)	38	(England) Bath
Alex Coles	Lock	21 September 1999 (aged 24)	5	(England) Northampton Saints
Charlie Ewels ^{(1)}	Lock	29 June 1995 (aged 28)	30	(England) Bath
Nick Isiekwe ^{(1)}	Lock	20 April 1998 (aged 26)	11	(England) Saracens
Maro Itoje (vc)	Lock	28 October 1994 (aged 29)	81	(England) Saracens
George Martin	Lock	18 June 2001 (aged 23)	12	(England) Leicester Tigers
Chandler Cunningham-South	Back row	18 March 2003 (aged 21)	4	(England) Harlequins
Ben Curry	Back row	15 June 1998 (aged 26)	5	(England) Sale Sharks
Tom Curry	Back row	15 June 1998 (aged 26)	50	(England) Sale Sharks
Alex Dombrandt	Back row	29 April 1997 (aged 27)	17	(England) Harlequins
Ben Earl (vc)	Back row	7 January 1998 (aged 26)	30	(England) Saracens
Ethan Roots	Back row	10 November 1997 (aged 26)	4	(England) Exeter Chiefs
Sam Underhill	Back row	22 July 1996 (aged 27)	35	(England) Bath
Alex Mitchell	Scrum-half	25 May 1997 (aged 27)	16	(England) Northampton Saints
Harry Randall	Scrum-half	18 December 1997 (aged 26)	6	(England) Bristol Bears
Ben Spencer	Scrum-half	31 July 1992 (aged 31)	5	(England) Bath
Fin Smith	Fly-half	11 May 2002 (aged 22)	2	(England) Northampton Saints
Marcus Smith	Fly-half	14 February 1999 (aged 25)	32	(England) Harlequins
Fraser Dingwall	Centre	7 April 1999 (aged 25)	2	(England) Northampton Saints
Ollie Lawrence	Centre	18 September 1999 (aged 24)	24	(England) Bath
Luke Northmore	Centre	16 March 1997 (aged 27)	0	(England) Harlequins
Henry Slade (vc)	Centre	19 March 1993 (aged 31)	62	(England) Exeter Chiefs
Immanuel Feyi-Waboso	Wing	20 December 2002 (aged 21)	3	(England) Exeter Chiefs
Tommy Freeman	Wing	5 March 2001 (aged 23)	8	(England) Northampton Saints
Tom Roebuck	Wing	7 January 2001 (aged 23)	0	(England) Sale Sharks
Ollie Sleightholme	Wing	13 April 2000 (aged 24)	0	(England) Northampton Saints
Joe Carpenter	Fullback	19 August 2001 (aged 22)	0	(England) Sale Sharks
George Furbank	Fullback	17 October 1996 (aged 27)	9	(England) Northampton Saints
Freddie Steward	Fullback	5 December 2000 (aged 23)	33	(England) Leicester Tigers

=== New Zealand ===
New Zealand named a 32-player squad for the summer test series on 24 June 2024.

^{(1)} On 8 July 2024, TJ Perenara was ruled out of the second test against England, after sustaining a knee injury during the first test match two days earlier. He was replaced in the New Zealand squad by Noah Hotham.

Note: Ages, caps and clubs are as of 6 July 2024, the day of New Zealand's first test match of the summer series.

Player	Position	Date of birth (age)	Caps	Franchise/province
Asafo Aumua	Hooker	5 May 1997 (aged 27)	6	(New Zealand) Hurricanes / Wellington
Codie Taylor	Hooker	31 March 1991 (aged 33)	85	(New Zealand) Crusaders / Canterbury
George Bell	Hooker	29 January 2002 (aged 22)	0	(New Zealand) Crusaders / Canterbury
Ethan de Groot	Prop	22 July 1998 (aged 25)	22	(New Zealand) Highlanders / Southland
Tyrel Lomax	Prop	16 March 1996 (aged 28)	32	(New Zealand) Hurricanes / Tasman
Fletcher Newell	Prop	1 March 2000 (aged 24)	13	(New Zealand) Crusaders / Canterbury
Pasilio Tosi	Prop	18 July 1998 (aged 25)	0	(New Zealand) Hurricanes / Bay of Plenty
Ofa Tuʻungafasi	Prop	19 April 1992 (aged 32)	57	(New Zealand) Blues / Northland
Tamaiti Williams	Prop	10 August 2000 (aged 23)	7	(New Zealand) Crusaders / Canterbury
Scott Barrett (c)	Lock	20 November 1993 (aged 30)	69	(New Zealand) Crusaders / Taranaki
Tupou Vaa'i	Lock	27 January 2000 (aged 24)	25	(New Zealand) Chiefs / Taranaki
Patrick Tuipulotu	Lock	23 January 1993 (aged 31)	43	(New Zealand) Blues / Auckland
Ethan Blackadder	Loose forward	22 March 1995 (aged 29)	10	(New Zealand) Crusaders / Tasman
Samipeni Finau	Loose forward	10 May 1999 (aged 25)	1	(New Zealand) Chiefs / Waikato
Luke Jacobson	Loose forward	20 April 1997 (aged 27)	18	(New Zealand) Chiefs / Waikato
Dalton Papalii	Loose forward	11 October 1997 (aged 26)	32	(New Zealand) Blues / Counties Manukau
Ardie Savea (vc)	Loose forward	14 October 1993 (aged 30)	81	(New Zealand) Hurricanes / Wellington
Wallace Sititi	Loose forward	7 September 2002 (aged 21)	0	(New Zealand) Chiefs / North Harbour
Finlay Christie	Half-back	19 September 1995 (aged 28)	21	(New Zealand) Blues / Tasman
Noah Hotham ^{(1)}	Half-back	23 May 2003 (age 23)	0	(New Zealand) Crusaders / Tasman
TJ Perenara ^{(1)}	Half-back	23 January 1992 (aged 32)	80	(New Zealand) Hurricanes / Wellington
Cortez Ratima	Half-back	22 March 2001 (aged 23)	0	(New Zealand) Chiefs / Waikato
Beauden Barrett	First five-eighth	27 May 1991 (aged 33)	123	(New Zealand) Blues / Taranaki
Damian McKenzie	First five-eighth	20 April 1995 (aged 29)	47	(New Zealand) Chiefs / Waikato
Jordie Barrett	Centre	17 February 1997 (aged 27)	57	(New Zealand) Hurricanes / Taranaki
Rieko Ioane	Centre	18 March 1997 (aged 27)	67	(New Zealand) Blues / Auckland
Anton Lienert-Brown	Centre	15 April 1995 (aged 29)	70	(New Zealand) Chiefs / Waikato
Billy Proctor	Centre	14 May 1999 (aged 25)	0	(New Zealand) Hurricanes / Wellington
Caleb Clarke	Wing	29 March 1999 (aged 25)	20	(New Zealand) Blues / Auckland
Emoni Narawa	Wing	13 July 1999 (aged 24)	1	(New Zealand) Chiefs / Bay of Plenty
Stephen Perofeta	Wing	12 March 1997 (aged 27)	3	(New Zealand) Blues / Taranaki
Sevu Reece	Wing	13 February 1997 (aged 27)	23	(New Zealand) Crusaders / Southland
Mark Tele'a	Wing	6 December 1996 (aged 27)	9	(New Zealand) Blues / North Harbour

== Matches ==
=== Japan vs England ===
22 June 2024
14:50 JST (UTC+09)

Japan	17–52	England
Try: Nezuka 66' c Yamasawa 69' c Con: Matsuda (2/2) 67', 70'; Pen: Lee (1/1) 3'	Report	Try: Cunningham-South 14' c M. Smith 25' c Feyi-Waboso 29' c Slade 40+2' m Mitchell 43' c Earl 50' m Randall 58' c Underhill 77' c Con: M. Smith (4/6) 15', 26', 30', 44'; Slade (2/2) 59', 78'

Japan National Stadium, Tokyo
Attendance: 44,029
Referee: Luc Ramos (France)

FB	15	Yoshitaka Yazaki	(substituted off) 55'
RW	14	Jone Naikabula
OC	13	Samisoni Tua
IC	12	Tomoki Osada
LW	11	Koga Nezuka
FH	10	Seung-sin Lee	(substituted off) 55'
SH	9	Naoto Saito	(substituted off) 55'
N8	8	Faulua Makisi
OF	7	Tiennan Costley	(substituted off) 59'
BF	6	Michael Leitch (c)
RL	5	Warner Dearns
LL	4	Sanaila Waqa	(substituted off) 55'
TP	3	Shuhei Takeuchi	(substituted off) 47'
HK	2	Mamoru Harada	(substituted off) 49'
LP	1	Takayoshi Mohara	(substituted off) 63'
Substitutions:
HK	16	Atsushi Sakate	(substituted on) 49'
PR	17	Shogo Miura	(substituted on) 63'
PR	18	Keijiro Tamefusa	(substituted on) 47'
LK	19	Amanaki Saumaki	(substituted on) 55'
FL	20	Kai Yamamoto	(substituted on) 59'
SH	21	Shinobu Fujiwara	(substituted on) 55'
FH	22	Rikiya Matsuda	(substituted on) 55'
FB	23	Takuya Yamasawa	(substituted on) 55'
Coach:
(Australia) Eddie Jones

FB	15	George Furbank
RW	14	Immanuel Feyi-Waboso		(substituted off) 59'
OC	13	Henry Slade
IC	12	Ollie Lawrence
LW	11	Tommy Freeman		(substituted off) 66'
FH	10	Marcus Smith	(yellow card) 55'	(substituted off) 66'
SH	9	Alex Mitchell		(substituted off) 51'
N8	8	Ben Earl
OF	7	Sam Underhill		(substituted off) 51'	(substituted on) 57'
BF	6	Chandler Cunningham-South			(substituted off) 57'
RL	5	George Martin
LL	4	Maro Itoje
TP	3	Dan Cole		(substituted off) 55'
HK	2	Jamie George (c)		(substituted off) 44'
LP	1	Bevan Rodd		(substituted off) 44'
Replacements:
HK	16	Theo Dan		(substituted on) 44'
PR	17	Joe Marler		(substituted on) 44'
PR	18	Will Stuart		(substituted on) 55'
LK	19	Charlie Ewels	(red card) 73'	(substituted on) 66'
FL	20	Tom Curry		(substituted on) 51'
SH	21	Harry Randall		(substituted on) 51'
FH	22	Fin Smith		(substituted on) 66'
WG	23	Tom Roebuck		(substituted on) 59'
Coach:
(England) Steve Borthwick

Assistant referees:
Eoghan Cross (Ireland)
Angus Mabey (New Zealand)
Television match official:
Eric Gauzins (France)
Foul play review officer:
Brian MacNeice (Ireland)

Notes:

- This was the first ever test match between the two countries to take place in Japan.
- Dylan Riley (Japan) was named in the starting line-up, but withdrew during the warm-up due to injury. He was replaced by Samisoni Tua, whose place on the bench was taken by Takuya Yamasawa.
- Tiennan Costley, Shinobu Fujiwara, Mamoru Harada, Takayoshi Mohara, Keijiro Tamefusa, Samisoni Tua, Kai Yamamoto, Yoshitaka Yazaki (all Japan) and Tom Roebuck (England) made their international debuts.
- Charlie Ewels became the first England player to receive two red cards in their test career.

=== New Zealand vs England (1st test) ===
6 July 2024
19:05 NZST (UTC+12)

New Zealand	16–15	England
Try: Reece 16' m Savea 25' m Pen: McKenzie (2/3) 55', 66'	Report	Try: Itoje 21' c Feyi-Waboso 48' m Con: M. Smith (1/2) 22'; Pen: M. Smith (1/3) 40+4'

Forsyth Barr Stadium, Dunedin
Attendance: 28,483
Referee: Nika Amashukeli (Georgia)

FB	15	Stephen Perofeta	(substituted off) 52'
RW	14	Sevu Reece
OC	13	Rieko Ioane	(substituted off) 69'
IC	12	Jordie Barrett
LW	11	Mark Tele'a
FH	10	Damian McKenzie
SH	9	TJ Perenara	(substituted off) 41'
N8	8	Ardie Savea
OF	7	Dalton Papali'i
BF	6	Samipeni Finau	(substituted off) 58'
RL	5	Patrick Tuipulotu	(substituted off) 62'
LL	4	Scott Barrett (c)
TP	3	Tyrel Lomax	(substituted off) 52'
HK	2	Codie Taylor	(substituted off) 64'
LP	1	Ethan de Groot	(substituted off) 50'
Substitutions:
HK	16	Asafo Aumua	(substituted on) 64'
PR	17	Ofa Tu'ungafasi	(substituted on) 50'
PR	18	Fletcher Newell	(substituted on) 52'
LK	19	Tupou Vaa'i	(substituted on) 58'
FL	20	Luke Jacobson	(substituted on) 62'
SH	21	Finlay Christie	(substituted on) 41'
CE	22	Anton Lienert-Brown	(substituted on) 69'
FB	23	Beauden Barrett	(substituted on) 52'
Coach:
(New Zealand) Scott Robertson

FB	15	George Furbank
RW	14	Immanuel Feyi-Waboso	(substituted off) 76'
OC	13	Henry Slade
IC	12	Ollie Lawrence
LW	11	Tommy Freeman
FH	10	Marcus Smith	(substituted off) 66'
SH	9	Alex Mitchell	(substituted off) 58'
N8	8	Ben Earl
OF	7	Sam Underhill	(substituted off) 63'
BF	6	Chandler Cunningham-South	(substituted off) 52'
RL	5	George Martin
LL	4	Maro Itoje
TP	3	Will Stuart	(substituted off) 52'
HK	2	Jamie George (c)	(substituted off) 55'
LP	1	Joe Marler	(substituted off) 18'
Replacements:
HK	16	Theo Dan	(substituted on) 55'
PR	17	Fin Baxter	(substituted on) 18'
PR	18	Dan Cole	(substituted on) 52'
LK	19	Alex Coles	(substituted on) 63'
FL	20	Tom Curry	(substituted on) 52'
SH	21	Ben Spencer	(substituted on) 58'
FH	22	Fin Smith	(substituted on) 66'
WG	23	Ollie Sleightholme	(substituted on) 76'
Coach:
(England) Steve Borthwick

Player of the Match:
Sevu Reece (New Zealand)
Assistant referees:
Nic Berry (Australia)
Jordan Way (Australia)
Television match official:
Eric Gauzins (France)
Foul play review officer:
Brett Cronan (Australia)

Notes:

- Fin Baxter and Ollie Sleightholme (both England) made their international debuts.

=== New Zealand vs England (2nd test) ===
13 July 2024
19:05 NZST (UTC+12)

New Zealand	24–17	England
Try: Tele'a (2) 11' c, 61' m Con: McKenzie (1/2) 13'; Pen: McKenzie (4/4) 20', 38', 69', 75'	Report	Try: Feyi-Waboso 14' c Freeman 40+1' c Con: Smith (2/2) 15', 40+2'; Pen: Smith (1/1) 49'

Eden Park, Auckland
Attendance: 48,362
Referee: Nic Berry (Australia)

FB	15	Stephen Perofeta	(substituted off) 49'
RW	14	Sevu Reece
OC	13	Rieko Ioane	(substituted off) 59'
IC	12	Jordie Barrett
LW	11	Mark Tele'a
FH	10	Damian McKenzie
SH	9	Finlay Christie	(substituted off) 53'
N8	8	Ardie Savea
OF	7	Dalton Papali'i
BF	6	Samipeni Finau	(substituted off) 49'
RL	5	Patrick Tuipulotu	(substituted off) 54'
LL	4	Scott Barrett (c)
TP	3	Tyrel Lomax	(substituted off) 54'
HK	2	Codie Taylor	(substituted off) 64'
LP	1	Ethan de Groot	(substituted off) 49'
Substitutions:
HK	16	Asafo Aumua	(substituted on) 64'
PR	17	Ofa Tu'ungafasi	(substituted on) 49'
PR	18	Fletcher Newell	(substituted on) 54'
LK	19	Tupou Vaa'i	(substituted on) 54'
FL	20	Luke Jacobson	(substituted on) 49'
SH	21	Cortez Ratima	(substituted on) 53'
CE	22	Anton Lienert-Brown	(substituted on) 59'
FB	23	Beauden Barrett	(substituted on) 49'
Coach:
(New Zealand) Scott Robertson

FB	15	Freddie Steward		(substituted off) 69'
RW	14	Immanuel Feyi-Waboso	(substituted off) 68'
OC	13	Henry Slade
IC	12	Ollie Lawrence
LW	11	Tommy Freeman
FH	10	Marcus Smith	(substituted off) 62'	(substituted on) 69'
SH	9	Alex Mitchell
N8	8	Ben Earl
OF	7	Sam Underhill	(substituted off) 49'
BF	6	Chandler Cunningham-South	(substituted off) 62'
RL	5	George Martin
LL	4	Maro Itoje
TP	3	Will Stuart	(substituted off) 49'
HK	2	Jamie George (c)	(substituted off) 49'	(substituted on) 51'
LP	1	Fin Baxter	(substituted off) 68'
Replacements:
HK	16	Theo Dan	(substituted on) 49'	(substituted off) 51'
PR	17	Bevan Rodd	(substituted on) 68'
PR	18	Dan Cole	(substituted on) 49'
LK	19	Alex Coles	(substituted on) 62'
FL	20	Tom Curry	(substituted on) 49'
SH	21	Ben Spencer
FH	22	Fin Smith	(substituted on) 62'
WG	23	Ollie Sleightholme	(substituted on) 68'
Coach:
(England) Steve Borthwick

Player of the Match:
Mark Tele'a (New Zealand)
Assistant referees:
Damon Murphy (Australia)
Pierre Brousset (France)
Television match official:
Brett Cronan (Australia)
Foul play review officer:
Eric Gauzins. (France)

Notes:

- New Zealand retained the Hillary Shield.
- Cortez Ratima (New Zealand) made his international debut.
- George Furbank (England) was initially named to start at full-back, but was forced to withdraw prior to the match, due to a back injury. He was replaced by Freddie Steward

== See also ==
- 2024 mid-year rugby union tests
- 2024 France rugby union tour of Argentina and Uruguay
- 2024 Ireland rugby union tour of South Africa
- 2024 Wales rugby union tour of Australia
