= Kent Invicta =

English amateur rugby league club

Club information
- Full name: Kent Invicta RLFC
- Colours: Black shirt with an amber chevron, black shorts and black socks
- Founded: 1983; 42 years ago
- Exited: 1986; 39 years ago

Former details
- Ground(s): London Road, Maidstone Roots Hall Stadium, Southend

Kent Invicta is a defunct rugby league team that were based in Maidstone, Kent and later Southend in Essex.

== History ==
=== Kent Invicta RLFC and Southend Invicta RLFC ===
Kent Invicta RLFC was formed by a local businessman, Paul Faires, and Jim Thompson, Maidstone United FC's chairman; Faires' desire to form the club was reported in October 1982. The club was admitted to the Rugby Football League on 6 April 1983 and entered the Second Division; their application for membership reportedly received "overwhelming support". Faires previously was involved with Radio Caroline and had played rugby union, having been privately educated, but became interested in rugby league after watching Fulham playing. In the summer of 1983 the club signed Bob Mordell, Mark Elia and the veteran Ian Van Bellen. The moniker "Invicta" (unvanquished) is the motto of Kent. The club colours consisted of a black shirt with an amber chevron, black shorts and black socks. The club played its first game at London Road, Maidstone, a ground it shared with Maidstone United. It lost the game 31–12 against Cardiff City Blue Dragons. On 5 November 1983 it was reported that acting chairman Jim Thompson had clinched a deal which would see the club out of its financial problems and four days later it was considered to be in a good financial position and to have reached agreement with other clubs about its transfer debts. The club continued to play competitively, despite its financial problems, and on 11 February 1984 its Challenge Cup tie against Castleford was televised live on the BBC's Grandstand.

Following problems with waterlogging on the pitch at Maidstone, in the summer of 1984 the team became Southend Invicta, and started playing games at the Roots Hall Stadium in Southend. The club colours changed to white shirts with a blue V, white shorts and white socks. Invicta were struck from the 1985-86 fixtures by the Rugby Football League because it was considered not to have formed a team.; for its last home game against Huddersfield that spring, it had attracted a crowd of only 85 people. The club went into liquidation soon afterwards.

== Notable players ==
- John Donnelly
- Mark Elia
- Gary Freeman
- Gary Hetherington
- Lynn Hopkins
- Bob Mordell
