= Tom Roebuck =

English rugby union player (born 2001)

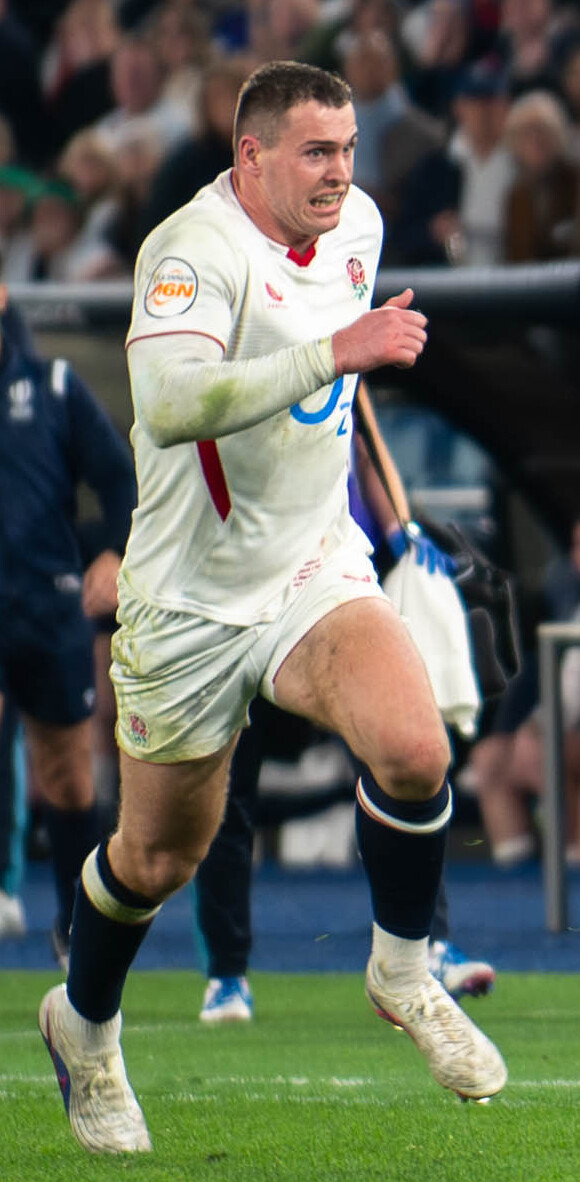
- Born: 7 January 2001 (age 25) Inverness, Scotland
- Height: 1.88 m (6 ft 2 in)
- Weight: 96 kg (212 lb; 15 st 2 lb)
- School: Wirral Grammar School for Boys

Rugby union career
- Position(s): Wing, Centre
- Current team: Sale Sharks
Senior career
Years	Team	Apps	(Points)
2018–	Sale Sharks	91	(205)
- Correct as of 19 January 2025
International career
Years	Team	Apps	(Points)
2018–2019	England under-18	6	(20)
2020–2021	England under-20	7	(5)
2024–	England	12	(40)
- Correct as of 14 March 2026

Tom Roebuck (born 7 January 2001) is an English professional rugby union player who plays as a wing for Premiership Rugby club Sale Sharks.

== Early life ==
Roebuck was born in Inverness, Scotland. He attended Christleton High School before moving on to Wirral Grammar. He played youth rugby at Chester RUFC.

While at Wirral he played in the 2018 U18 Vase Final at Twickenham stadium. They were defeated by Langley School 48–22, although Roebuck did score a try in his side's defeat.

== Club career ==
As part of Sale Sharks' Under-18 squad Roebuck played in their undefeated tour of Ireland in 2017, beating both Munster and Leinster development sides.

Roebuck made his debut as a senior Sale Sharks player in the opening match of the inaugural Premiership Rugby Cup on 26 October 2018, a 35–3 defeat to Worcester Warriors. He signed his first senior contract with Sale in November 2018.

Roebuck spent periods during 2019 on loan at both Sale FC and Fylde RFC. He made a handful of appearances for the first team in the 2019–20 season and scored his first senior try for the club in a 17-36 Premiership Rugby Cup victory over Saracens. He made 5 Premiership appearances in the 2020–21 season, starting on the wing in 3 matches.

Roebuck began to appear for the first team with a much greater regularity during the 2021–22 season under Sale's new director of rugby Alex Sanderson. During this run of appearances he scored his first try in the European Rugby Champions Cup in a 25–19 defeat to ASM Clermont. He went on to score a brace of tries in the following match against Ospreys, securing a 49–10 victory for Sale. Roebuck again scored in the away leg during the Round of 16 against Bristol Bears. Sale would then fall in the quarter finals to Racing 92.

Roebuck scored his first try in Premiership Rugby during Sale's 35–26 win over the league leaders Leicester Tigers, and followed this up by scoring two tries in the next round against Harlequins which ensured a 14–36 victory for Sale at the Stoop. Roebuck started regularly for the club for the remainder of the season and scored a try in Sale's final game against Bristol in a 42-19 win.

In May 2023 Roebuck scored a try during their Premiership semi-final victory over Leicester. He also scored a try in the final as Sale were defeated by Saracens to finish league runners-up.

== International career ==
=== Youth ===
Roebuck was first called up for an England age grade training camp in September 2017, at the age of 16. He was subsequently called up to an England Under-17 training camp in February 2018.

In May 2018 Roebuck was called up to the Great Britain Under-18 7s squad for the Youth Olympic Games qualifiers held in Panevezys, Lithuania. They were defeated by Germany in the quarter-finals and eventually finished fifth, failing to progress to the Youth Olympic Games.

Roebuck was first called up to the England Under 18 squad in July 2018 for the Aon U18 International Series in South Africa. He featured in all 3 of England's matches during the tournament: a 41–21 loss to France Under-18, a 26–20 loss to Wales Under-18 and a 41–22 loss to South Africa Schools. Roebuck scored two tries in the match against South Africa Schools.

Roebuck was next named in the England Under 18 squad for fixtures against Scotland and France in March 2019. He scored two tries in England's 36–21 win over Scotland. Coach Jim Mallinder named Roebuck as part of his England squad for the 2019 U18 Six Nations Festival. Roebuck started on the wing for England's 38–20 win over Wales, while he was not selected for England's win over Ireland or their loss to France.

Roebuck was named as part of an England Under-20 training camp in November 2019. He went on to be named as part of England's Elite Player Squad for the 2020 Under-20 Six Nations in January 2020. Roebuck started all four of England games which were played before the tournament was ended early by the effects of the COVID-19 pandemic, scoring a try in their opening fixture against France.

Roebuck was selected for a friendly against a London Irish XV in March 2021 and for a friendly against a Newcastle Falcons XV two weeks later. Alan Dickens, England Under-20 head coach then named Roebuck as part of the squad for the 2021 Six Nations Under 20s Championship. Roebuck made his first appearance off the bench in England's 24–15 victory over Ireland in the third round of the competition. He then started England's wins over Wales and Italy at Cardiff Arms Park as they secured their grand slam.

=== Senior ===
Roebuck was called up to the senior England squad for a training camp in October 2022.

Roebuck was included in the England side for their 2024 summer tour. On 22 June 2024, he made his senior Test debut, off the bench as a substitute, in a 52–17 victory against Japan. Later that year on 24 November 2024, Roebuck scored his first international try in a 59–14 victory over Japan at Twickenham.

Roebuck made his first international start in the last round of the 2025 Six Nations Championship and scored a try as England beat Wales at the Millennium Stadium to finish runners up. Later that year he was selected for their 2025 tour of Argentina and scored two tries in their opening match. He also started in the next game as England completed a series victory.

=== List of international tries ===
as of 14 March 2026.

No.	Date	Venue	Opponent	Score	Result	Competition	Ref.
1	24 November 2024	Twickenham Stadium, London, England	Japan	57–14	59–14	2024 Autumn International	
2	15 March 2025	Millennium Stadium, Cardiff, Wales	Wales	12–0	68–14	2025 Six Nations Championship	
3	5 July 2025	Estadio Jorge Luis Hirschi, Buenos Aires, Argentina	Argentina	8–0	35–12	2025 Summer Tour	
4	5 July 2025	Estadio Jorge Luis Hirschi, Buenos Aires, Argentina	Argentina	20–0	35–12	2025 Summer Tour	
5	15 November 2025	Twickenham Stadium, London, England	New Zealand	33–19	33–19	2025 Autumn International	
6	7 February 2026	Twickenham Stadium, London, England	Wales	34–0	48–7	2026 Six Nations Championship	
7	7 March 2026	Stadio Olimpico, Rome	Italy	10–10	18-23	2026 Six Nations Championship	
8	14 March 2026	Stade de France, Saint-Denis	France	5–7	46-48	2026 Six Nations Championship	
