= Immanuel Feyi-Waboso =

English rugby union player (born 2002)

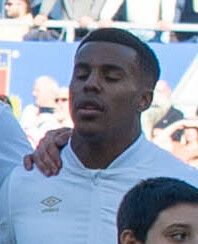
- Feyi-Waboso in February 2024
- Born: 20 December 2002 (age 23) Cardiff, Wales
- Height: 1.83 m (6 ft 0 in)
- Weight: 89 kg (196 lb; 14 st 0 lb)
- School: Corpus Christi Roman Catholic High School, Cardiff; Clifton College
- University: Aston University; University of Exeter

Rugby union career
- Position(s): Wing, Centre
- Current team: Exeter Chiefs
Senior career
Years	Team	Apps	(Points)
2021	Cardiff	1	(0)
2022	Wasps	2	(0)
2022–	Exeter Chiefs	59	(170)
- Correct as of 31 October 2026
International career
Years	Team	Apps	(Points)
2024–	England	17	(45)
- Correct as of 8 November 2026

Immanuel Feyi-Waboso (born 20 December 2002) is a professional rugby union player who plays as a wing for PREM Rugby club Exeter Chiefs. Born in Wales, he represents the England national team.

== Early life and education ==
Feyi-Waboso is one of six siblings, born to parents with Nigerian, English and Jamaican heritage. He was born in Wales and grew up in Llandaff, Cardiff, where he began playing rugby.

After school at Clifton College in Bristol, he initially studied at Aston University, then moved to study medicine at University of Exeter.

== Club career ==
Feyi-Waboso began playing with Rumney RFC, and played for Cardiff Schools at U-11 and U-15 level. He signed for the Cardiff Blues academy ahead of the 2020–21 season. He made his Cardiff Blues debut in Round 1 of the Pro14 Rainbow Cup against Ospreys. Feyi-Waboso left Cardiff after failing to secure a place in the medical programme at Cardiff University despite strong grades. He took up a place at Aston University instead.

=== Wasps ===
On 14 February 2022, Wasps announced the signing of Feyi-Waboso from the 2022–2023 season onwards.

=== Exeter Chiefs ===
Following Wasps' expulsion from the league due to their entering administration, Feyi-Waboso was signed by Exeter Chiefs. He made his debut that same month in the Premiership Cup against Bath before making his Premiership league debut for the club against London Irish.

In April 2024, he set a new record in the Champions Cup by beating 13 defenders in the round of 16 against Bath, the most any player has managed in a single Champions Cup fixture since competition records began in 2009. In May 2024, having scored 10 tries throughout the league season, he won Breakthrough Player of the Season. That same month, he was named in the Premiership Rugby Team of the Season for the 2023–24 campaign. He also won the RPA Young Player of the Season 2023-24 as voted for by his fellow players.

In December 2024, Feyi-Waboso scored from a cross-field kick in the opening fixture of the 2024-25 European Rugby Champions Cup in a 39-21 away loss to the Sharks. That same month, he dislocated his shoulder against Sale Sharks initially ruling him out for three months. However, after mismanagement of his return to play by the England national team, he re-injured the shoulder while training for the 2025 Six Nations, eventually ruling him out for the rest of the season.

In September 2025, having not played club rugby since December the previous year, he scored two tries, including the equalising score as Chiefs came back from 33–7 down to draw 33–33 with Northampton Saints in their opening Prem fixture of the 2025–26 season. The following week, he scored a hat trick of tries in a 38–15 victory over Newcastle Red Bulls. At the end of that season he started in the 2026 Prem final as Exeter were defeated by Northampton to finish league runners up.

== International career ==
Feyi-Waboso represented Wales under-18 and expressed his ambition to play for Wales at international level in 2023. Ultimately he chose to represent England who he also qualified to play for on ancestry grounds as his father is half Nigerian and half English, and his paternal grandmother is from Gloucester.

On 17 January 2024, Feyi-Waboso received his first call-up to the senior England squad for the 2024 Six Nations Championship. On 3 February 2024, he made his Test debut, in a 27–24 win against Italy during the opening round of the Six Nations. He scored his first international try on his third international appearance in a 30–21 loss against Scotland on 24 February 2024 again coming off the bench. He made his first start in the penultimate round against Ireland on 9 March 2024.

Feyi-Waboso was a member of the England squad for their 2024 summer tour and scored a try in the 52–17 victory over Japan. He also scored tries in both of their defeats against New Zealand which saw England lose the series. Later that year in November 2024, he scored another try against New Zealand in a narrow 24–22 defeat during the Autumn Nations Series at Twickenham. This accomplishment meant he had the unfortunate record of having scored three tries, three games in a row against New Zealand and losing all three games. Having scored five tries in eight international appearances, he was shortlisted for the 2024 Breakthrough Player of the Year before losing out to Wallace Sititi.

In February 2025, Feyi-Waboso was ruled out of the 2025 Six Nations after undergoing shoulder surgery for an injury he sustained. In June 2025, after returning from shoulder surgery he received his first red card in a match for England XV during the pre-summer tour fixture against France XV after a high tackle on Antoine Hastoy. England XV eventually lost 26–24 and he was suspended for two games including the two-test series against Argentina. Despite this, head coach Steve Borthwick retained him in the squad and he featured in their last fixture of the tour against USA.

=== List of international tries ===
as of 18 July 2026

No.	Date	Venue	Opponent	Score	Result	Competition
1	24 February 2024	Murrayfield Stadium, Edinburgh	Scotland	30–21	30–21	2024 Six Nations Championship
2	22 June 2024	Japan National Stadium, Tokyo	Japan	3–19	17–52	2024 England rugby union tour of New Zealand
3	6 July 2024	Forsyth Barr Stadium, Dunedin	New Zealand	15–10	16–15	2024 England rugby union tour of New Zealand
4	13 July 2024	Eden Park, Auckland	New Zealand	7–5	24–17	2024 England rugby union tour of New Zealand
5	2 November 2024	Twickenham Stadium, London	New Zealand	17–14	22–24	2024 end-of-year rugby union internationals
6	8 November 2025	Twickenham Stadium, London	Fiji	12–13	38–18	2025 end-of-year rugby union internationals
7	22 November 2025	Twickenham Stadium, London	Argentina	15–0	27–23	2025 end-of-year rugby union internationals
8	11 July 2026	Hill Dickinson Stadium, Liverpool	Fiji	40–8	73–8	2026 Nations Championship
9	18 July 2026	Estadio Único Madre de Ciudades, Santiago del Estero	Argentina	17–31	24–31	2026 Nations Championship

== Personal life ==
Born to Nigerian parents in Llandaff, Wales, Feyi-Waboso attended Corpus Christi High school. Apart from rugby, he also showed a talent for hurdles and high jump.

Since 2022, alongside playing for Exeter Chiefs and England, Feyi-Waboso is also studying a medical degree at the University of Exeter. During the 2024 Six Nations, he missed a three day training camp with England to complete a face-to-face exam as part of his studies.

== Honours ==
Exeter

- PREM Rugby runner-up: 2025–26

Individual

- Premiership Rugby Young Player of the Season: 2023–24
