= 1979 England rugby union tour of Japan, Fiji and Tonga =

Summary
P	W	D	L
Total
7	7	0	0
Test match
4	4	0	0
Opponent
P	W	D	L
Japan
2	2	0	0
Fiji
1	1	0	0
Tonga
1	1	0	0

In 1979 an England rugby union touring team toured Japan, Fiji and Tonga. The tourists won all their seven matches, scoring 270 points and conceding only 93. Only the first international against Japan was close, with Japan leading 19–15 going into injury time – a converted try by Peter Squires allowed England to win the match.

England did not award full international caps for the matches against Japan, Fiji and Tonga and the tourists played under the name of England XV rather than England in those games. The Welsh referee Clive Norling travelled with the party and refereed five of the matches. The leading tour points scorer was Huw Davies, with 60 points, and the leading try-scorers were John Carleton (9 tries) and Mike Slemen (7 tries).

The visit to Tonga was the first time that a major rugby nation had visited the country.

== Matches ==
Scores and results list England's points tally first.

Opposing Team	For	Against	Date	Venue	Status
Japan 'B'	36	7	10 May 1979	Tokyo	Tour match
Japan	21	19	13 May 1979	Kintetsu Hanazono Stadium, Osaka	First 'Test'
Kyūshū	80	3	16 May 1979	Fukuoka	Tour match
Japan	38	18	20 May 1979	Olympic Stadium, Tokyo	Second 'Test'
Fiji Juniors	39	22	25 May 1979	Lautoka	Tour match
Fiji	19	7	29 May 1979	National Stadium, Suva	'Test' Match
Tonga	37	17	1 June 1979	Teufaiva Sport Stadium, Nukuʻalofa	'Test' Match

== Touring party ==
- Manager: Budge Rogers
- Assistant Manager: Mike Davis
- Captain: Bill Beaumont

=== Full back ===
- Dusty Hare (Leicester)
- Alastair Hignell (Bristol)

=== Three-quarters ===
- Peter Squires (Harrogate)
- Mike Slemen (Liverpool)
- John Carleton (Orrell)
- Paul Dodge (Leicester)
- Richard Cardus (Roundhay)
- Alan McMillan (Gosforth)

=== Half-backs ===
- Neil Bennett (London Welsh)
- Huw Davies (Cardiff)
- Chris Gifford (Moseley)
- Ian Peck (Bedford)

=== Forwards ===
- John Scott (Cardiff)
- Toby Allchurch (Durham University)
- Nigel Pomphrey (Bristol)
- Bob Mordell (Rosslyn Park)
- Mike Rafter (Bristol)
- Bill Beaumont (Fylde)
- Maurice Colclough (Angoulême)
- John Butler (Gosforth)
- Colin Smart (Newport)
- Gary Pearce (Northampton)
- Richard Doubleday (Bristol)
- Peter Wheeler (Leicester)
- Jon Raphael (Bective Rangers)
