= Sam Underhill =

American-born English rugby union player (born 1996)

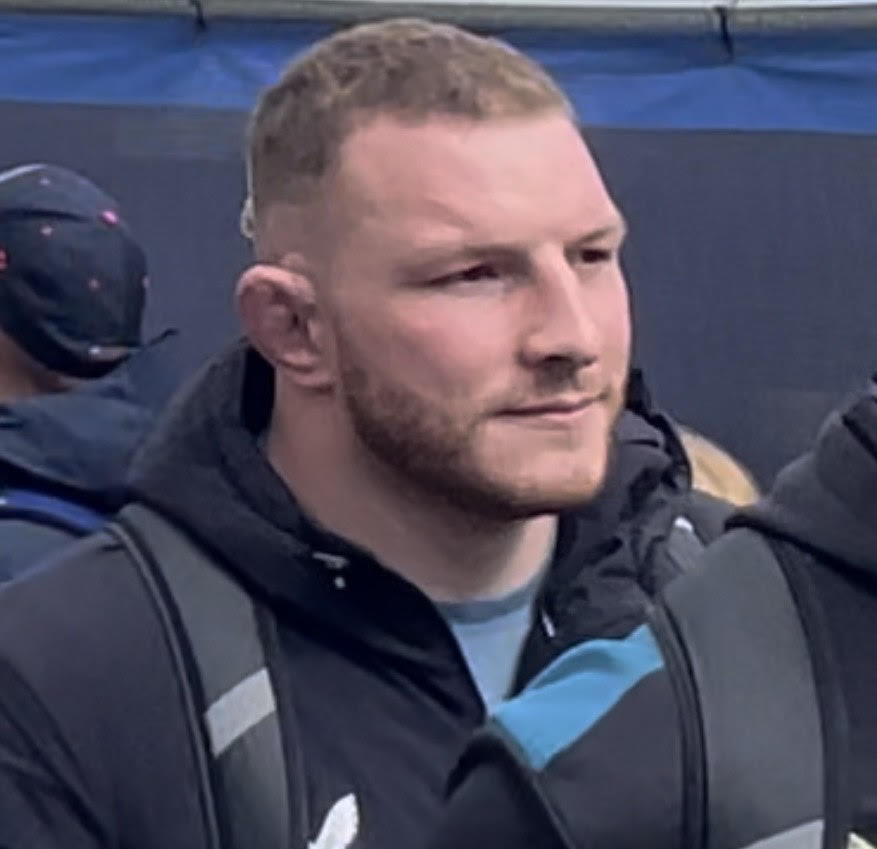
- Underhill in 2024
- Full name: Samuel Gregory Underhill
- Born: 22 July 1996 (age 30) Dayton, Ohio, United States
- Height: 1.86 m (6 ft 1 in)
- Weight: 106 kg (234 lb; 16 st 10 lb)
- School: Sir Thomas Rich's School
- University: University of Swansea; University of Bath

Rugby union career
- Position: Flanker
- Current team: Bath
Senior career
Years	Team	Apps	(Points)
2014–2015	Gloucester	2	(0)
2016	Cinderford (loan)	20	(35)
2015–2017	Ospreys	37	(20)
2017–	Bath	122	(100)
- Correct as of 1 May 2026
International career
Years	Team	Apps	(Points)
2014	England U18	9	(10)
2017–	England	50	(25)
- Correct as of 15 November 2025
Medal record
Men's Rugby union
Representing England
Rugby World Cup
Silver medal – second place	2019 Japan	Squad
Bronze medal – third place	2023 France	Squad

Samuel Gregory Underhill (born 22 July 1996) is a professional rugby union player who plays as a flanker for Premiership Rugby club Bath. Born in United States, he represents England national team.

== Early life ==
Underhill was born in the United States when his father served overseas in the Royal Air Force, he moved back to England aged one. He was brought up in Peterborough and then moved to Gloucestershire where he played for Sir Thomas Rich's School, Longlevens RFC and Gloucester Academy.

== Club career ==
Aged just 17, Underhill made his debut for Gloucester in the Anglo-Welsh Cup, before making his Premiership debut at the age of 18.

At the beginning of the 2015–16 season, Underhill joined Welsh Pro12 team Ospreys. He made his debut against Ulster and was man of the match in his first start for the team, against Munster. His last game for the region was during their defeat in the semi-final of the 2016–17 Pro12.

On 11 January 2017, it was confirmed that Underhill would join English side Bath for the 2017–18 season. He started in the 2024 Premiership final which they lost against Northampton Saints to finish runners up.

In April 2025, his try helped Bath to secure a first place finish in the regular season for the first time since the 2003–04 season during a 55–19 against Newcastle Falcons. The following month, Underhill started in the 2024–25 EPCR Challenge Cup final as Bath beat Lyon at the Millennium Stadium to win their first European trophy for seventeen years. However, he received a month long ban for a tackle during the match against Lyon ruling him out of the 2025 Premiership final which saw Bath defeat Leicester Tigers to become champions of England for the first time since 1996.

== International career ==
Underhill captained England U18 during their successful 2014 FIRA tournament and played nine times during an unbeaten season, including scoring a try on debut in a player of the match performance against Scotland, captaining the team to a win in the FIRA tournament and a win against South Africa.

Underhill was called up to the senior England squad by coach Eddie Jones for their 2017 summer tour of Argentina. On 17 June 2017 he made his international debut starting in the last test of the tour as England defeated Argentina to win the series 2–0.

On 12 August 2019, Underhill was named in Eddie Jones' 31-man squad for the 2019 Rugby World Cup. He was one of the stars of the semi-final victory over New Zealand, helping England to reach their first World Cup final since 2007. Underhill started in the 2019 Rugby World Cup final in which England were defeated by South Africa to finish runners up.

Underhill was a member of the squad that won the 2020 Six Nations Championship and later that year he started for the England side that defeated France after extra-time to win the Autumn Nations Cup. On 4 July 2021, Underhill scored his first try at international level in a game against the nation of his birth the United States. He was a member of their 2022 tour of Australia and started in the second test victory at Lang Park as England ultimately won the series 2–1.

Underhill was not initially included in the squad for the 2023 Rugby World Cup. However, he was called up after Jack Willis was injured during the pool stage. Underhill made his only appearance of the tournament in their last fixture starting in the victory over Argentina as England finished third with the Bronze medal.

== Career statistics ==
=== List of international tries ===
as of 24 November 2024

No.	Date	Venue	Opponent	Score	Result	Competition	Ref.
1	4 July 2021	Twickenham Stadium, London, England	United States	5–3	43–29	2021 July rugby union tests	
2	22 June 2024	Japan National Stadium, Tokyo, Japan	Japan	50–17	52–17	2024 tour of Japan	
3	16 November 2024	Twickenham Stadium, London, England	South Africa	15–19	20–29	2024 Autumn Internationals	
4	24 November 2024	Twickenham Stadium, London, England	Japan	12–0	59–14	2024 Autumn Internationals	

== Honours ==
England

- 1× Six Nations Championship: 2020
- 1× Autumn Nations Cup: 2020
- 1× Rugby World Cup runner-up: 2019

Bath

- 1× Premiership Rugby: 2024–2025
- 1× EPCR Challenge Cup: 2024–2025
