= England national rugby union team =

Sports team

England
- Emblem: Red Rose
- Union: Rugby Football Union
- Head coach: Steve Borthwick
- Captain: Maro Itoje
- Most caps: Ben Youngs (127)
- Top scorer: Owen Farrell (1,237)
- Top try scorer: Rory Underwood (49)
- Home stadium: Twickenham Stadium
First colours	Second colours

World Rugby ranking
- Current: 5 (as of 12 October 2026)
- Highest: 1 (2003, 2019)
- Lowest: 8 (2009, 2015, 2023)

First international
- Scotland 1–0 England (Edinburgh, Scotland; 27 March 1871)

Biggest win
- England 134–0 Romania (London, England; 17 November 2001)

Biggest defeat
- Australia 76–0 England (Brisbane, Australia; 6 June 1998)

World Cup
- Appearances: 10 (first in 1987)
- Best result: Champions (2003)
- Website: englandrugby.com

The England national rugby union team represents England in international men's rugby union. They participate annually in the Six Nations Championship with France, Ireland, Italy, Scotland and Wales. England have won the championship on 29 occasions (as well as sharing 10 victories), winning the Grand Slam 14 times and the Triple Crown 26 times, making them the most successful outright winners in the tournament's history. They are currently the only team from the Northern Hemisphere to win the Rugby World Cup, having won the tournament in 2003, and have been runners-up on three further occasions.

The team is run by the Rugby Football Union (RFU). Its history of the team extends back to 1871 when the England rugby team played their first official test match, losing 0–1 to Scotland. England dominated the early Home Nations Championship (now the Six Nations Championship) which started in 1883. Following the schism of rugby football in 1895 into union and league, England did not win the Championship again until 1910. They first played against New Zealand in 1905, South Africa in 1906, and Australia in 1909. England was one of the teams invited to take part in the inaugural Rugby World Cup in 1987. They progressed to the final in the second tournament in 1991, but lost to the eventual champions Australia. Following their Grand Slam in 2003, England went on to win the 2003 Rugby World Cup, defeating Australia in extra time. They contested the final again in 2007 in defence of their title but lost to South Africa. They reached the final for the fourth time in 2019, but lost to South Africa.

A number of countries have suffered their biggest-ever losses to England: Canada, Georgia, Netherlands, Romania and the United States.

England players traditionally wear a white shirt with a rose embroidered on the chest, white shorts, and navy blue socks with a white trim. England's home ground is Twickenham Stadium where they first played in 1910. The team is administered by the RFU. Five former players have been inducted into the International Rugby Hall of Fame. One of them is also a member of the IRB Hall of Fame. Seven other former players are members of the IRB Hall of Fame, four solely for their accomplishments as players, two solely for their achievements in other roles in the sport, and one for achievements both as a player and administrator. They have been branched in many different squads since the start of England Rugby, such as junior teams and women's teams.

== History ==
=== Early years ===
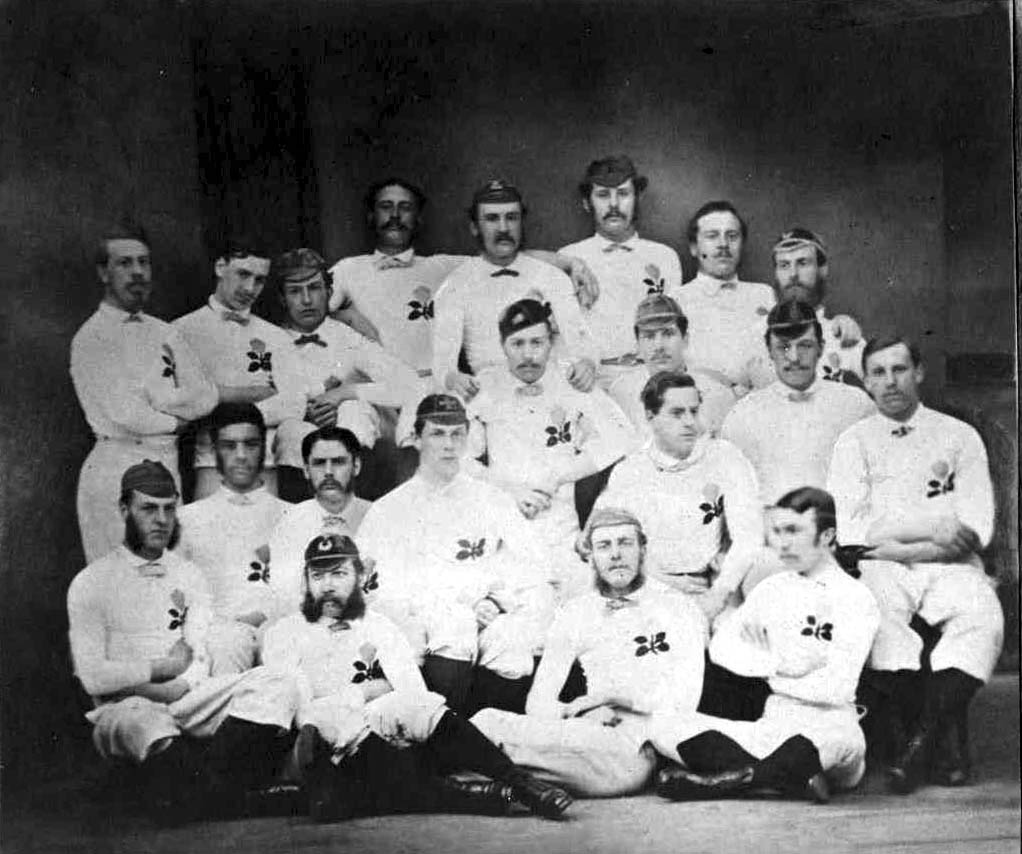
The England team before playing in their first international match, versus Scotland in Edinburgh, 1871

The expansion of rugby in the first half of the 19th century was driven by former pupils from many of England's public schools, especially Rugby, who, upon finishing school, took the game with them to universities, to London, and to the counties. England's first international match was against Scotland on 27 March 1871; not only was this England's first match, but it is also noted as being the first rugby union international. Scotland won the match by one goal and a try to England's one unconverted try, in front of a crowd of 4,000 people at Raeburn Place, Edinburgh. A subsequent international took place at the Oval in London on 5 February 1872, when England defeated Scotland by a goal, a drop goal and two tries to Scotland's one drop goal. The early matches did not use a structured points system; this would not be introduced until after 1890 when a suitable format for the scoring system had been devised. Up until 1875, international rugby matches were decided by the number of goals scored (conversions and dropped goals), but from 1876 the number of tries scored could be used to decide a match if the teams were level on goals.

In 1875, England played their first game against Ireland at the Oval, winning by one goal, one drop goal and one try to nil; this was Ireland's first test match. England defeated Scotland in 1880 to become the first winners of the Calcutta Cup. Their first match against Wales was played on 19 February 1881 at Richardson's Field in Blackheath, where England recorded their largest victory, winning by seven goals, six tries, and one drop goal to nil, and scoring 13 tries in the process. The subsequent meeting the following year at St. Helen's in Swansea was a closer contest, with England defeating Wales by two goals and four tries to nil (England's Charles Wade achieving the first ever hat-trick of tries). Two years later, England emerged as the inaugural winners at the first Home Nations championship. In 1889, they played their first match against a non-home nations team when they defeated the New Zealand Natives at Rectory Field in Blackheath by one goal and four tries to nil. England shared the Home Nations trophy with Scotland in 1890.

England first played New Zealand (known as the "All Blacks") in 1905 at Crystal Palace in London. New Zealand scored five tries, worth three points at the time, to win 15–0. England played France for the first time in March 1906 in Paris, winning 35–8, and later that year they first faced South Africa (known as the "Springboks"), again at Crystal Palace. James Peters was withdrawn from the England squad when the South Africans refused to play against a black player; the match was drawn 3–3. England first played Australia (known as the "Wallabies") in January 1909 at Blackheath's Rectory Field, where they were defeated 9–3.

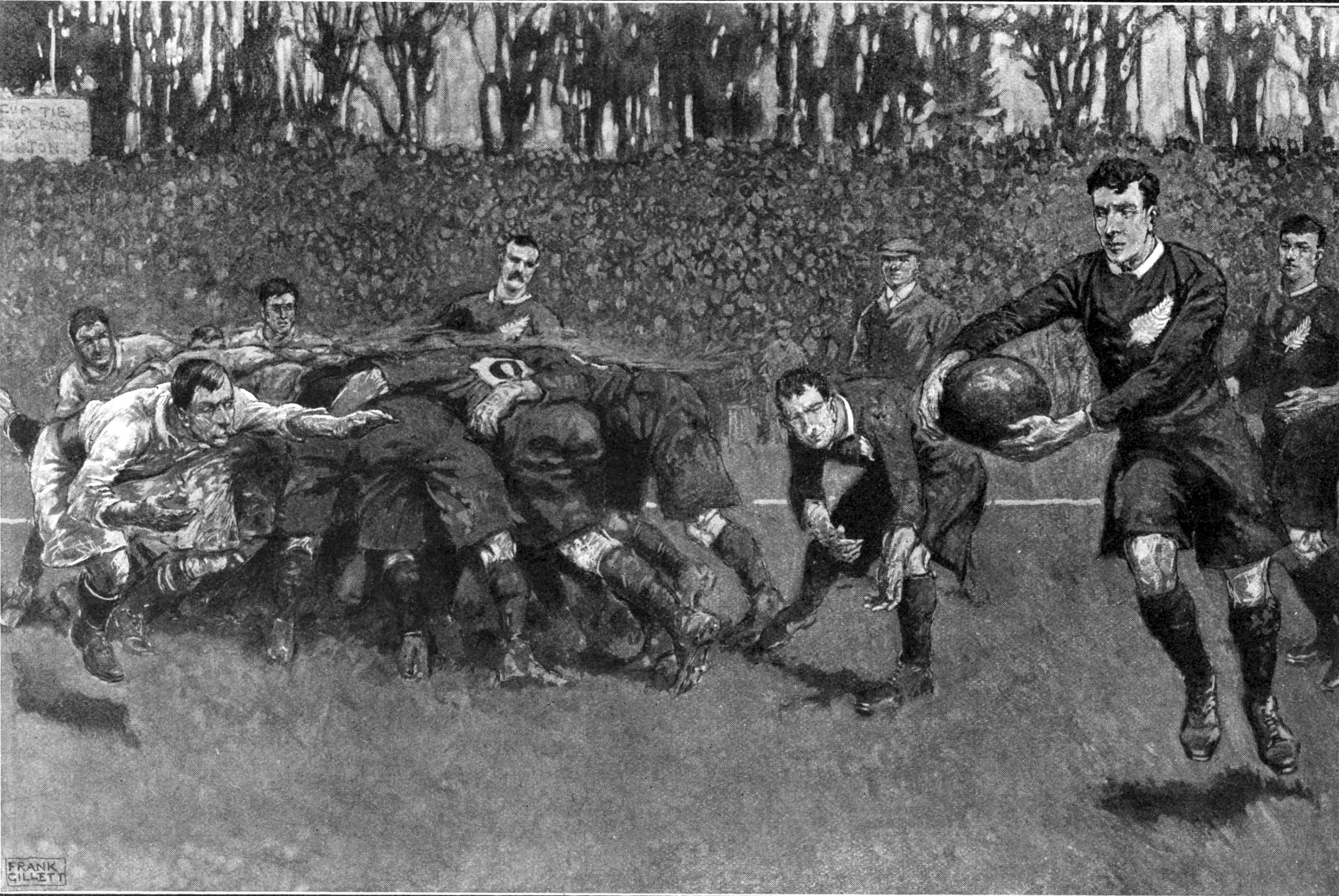
Illustration by Frank Gillett showing the England versus The Original All Blacks Test attended by a then-record crowd of at least 50,000. The New Zealanders won 15–0.

The year 1909 saw the opening of Twickenham Stadium as the RFU's new home, heralding a golden era for English rugby union. England's first international at Twickenham in 1910 brought them victory over Wales on their way to winning the International Championship (known from then as the Five Nations) for the first time since 1892. Although England did not retain the Five Nations title in 1911, they did share it (with Ireland) in 1912. England then achieved their first Five Nations Grand Slam in 1913, another in 1914, and a third in 1921 after the First World War. A further two consecutive Grand Slams followed for the England team in 1924 and 1925, this despite having started 1925 with an 17–11 loss to the "Invincibles" in front of 60,000 fans at Twickenham.

After winning a sixth Grand Slam in 1928, England were subjected to a 7–0 defeat by the Springboks in front of 70,000 spectators at Twickenham in January 1932. Following the expulsion of France from the International Championship in 1931 due to professionalism, which reverted the Five Nations tournament back to the Home Nations, England proceeded to win the 1934 and 1937 championships with a Triple Crown, and achieved their first victory over the All Blacks at Twickenham in January 1936.

When the Five Nations resumed with the readmission of France in 1947 after the Second World War, England shared the championship with Wales. The early Five Nations competitions of the 1950s were unsuccessful for England, winning one match in the 1950 and 1951 championships. England won the 1953 Five Nations, and followed this up with a Grand Slam in 1957, and win in 1958. England broke France's four-championship streak by winning the 1963 Championship. After this victory, England played three Tests in the Southern Hemisphere and lost all three: 21–11 and 9–6 against the All Blacks, and 18–9 against Australia. England did not win a single match in 1966, and managed only a draw with Ireland. They did not win another Championship that decade.

Don White was appointed as England's first coach in 1969. According to former Northampton player Bob Taylor, "Don was chosen because he was the most forward-thinking coach in England". His first match in charge was an 11–8 victory over South Africa at Twickenham in 1969. Of the eleven games England played with White in charge they won three, and drew one and lost seven. He resigned as England coach in 1971.

England had wins against Southern Hemisphere teams in the 1970s; with victories over South Africa in 1972, New Zealand in 1973 and Australia in 1973 and 1976. The 1972 Five Nations Championship was not completed due to the Troubles in Northern Ireland when Scotland and Wales refused to play their Five Nations away fixtures in Ireland. England played in Dublin in 1973 and were given a standing ovation lasting five minutes. After losing 18–9 at Lansdowne Road, the England captain, John Pullin famously stated, "We might not be very good but at least we turned up."

England started the following decade with a Grand Slam victory in the 1980 Five Nations – their first for 23 years. However in the 1983 Five Nations Championship, England failed to win a game and picked up the wooden spoon. In the first Rugby World Cup in New Zealand and Australia, England were grouped in pool A alongside Australia, Japan and the United States. England lost their first game 19–6 against Australia. They went on to defeat Japan and the United States, and met Wales in their quarter-final, losing the match 16–3.

In 1989, England won matches against Romania and Fiji, followed by victories in their first three Five Nations games of 1990. They lost to Scotland in their last game however, giving Scotland a Grand Slam. England recovered in the following year by winning their first Grand Slam since 1980. England hosted the 1991 World Cup and were in pool A, along with the All Blacks, Italy and the United States. Although they lost to the All Blacks in pool play, they qualified for a quarter-final going on to defeat France 19–10. England then defeated Scotland 9–6 to secure a place in the final against Australia which they lost 12–6.

The next year, England completed another Grand Slam and did not lose that year, including a victory over the Springboks. In the lead up to the 1995 World Cup in South Africa, England completed another Grand Slam – their third in five years. In the World Cup, England defeated Argentina, Italy and Samoa in pool play and then defeated Australia 25–22 in their quarter-final. England's semi-final was dominated by the All Blacks and featured four tries, now worth five points each, by Jonah Lomu; England lost 45–29. They then lost the third-place play-off match against France.

=== Professional era ===
England won their 20th Triple Crown title in 1997, but came second in the 1997 Five Nations Championship after a narrow defeat to France at Twickenham. Sir Clive Woodward replaced Jack Rowell as the England head coach later that year. On 6 December 1997, England drew with New Zealand at Twickenham, after being heavily defeated by South Africa at the same venue the week before and by New Zealand in Manchester two weeks previously. In 1998, England toured Australia, New Zealand and South Africa; many of the experienced players were unavailable for what was to become nicknamed the "Tour from Hell" during which England lost all of their matches including a punishing defeat by the Wallabies. In the last Five Nations match on 11 April 1999, with England poised to win the championship, Welsh centre Scott Gibbs sliced through six English tackles to score a try in the last minute, and the ensuing conversion by Neil Jenkins handed the final Five Nations title to Scotland.

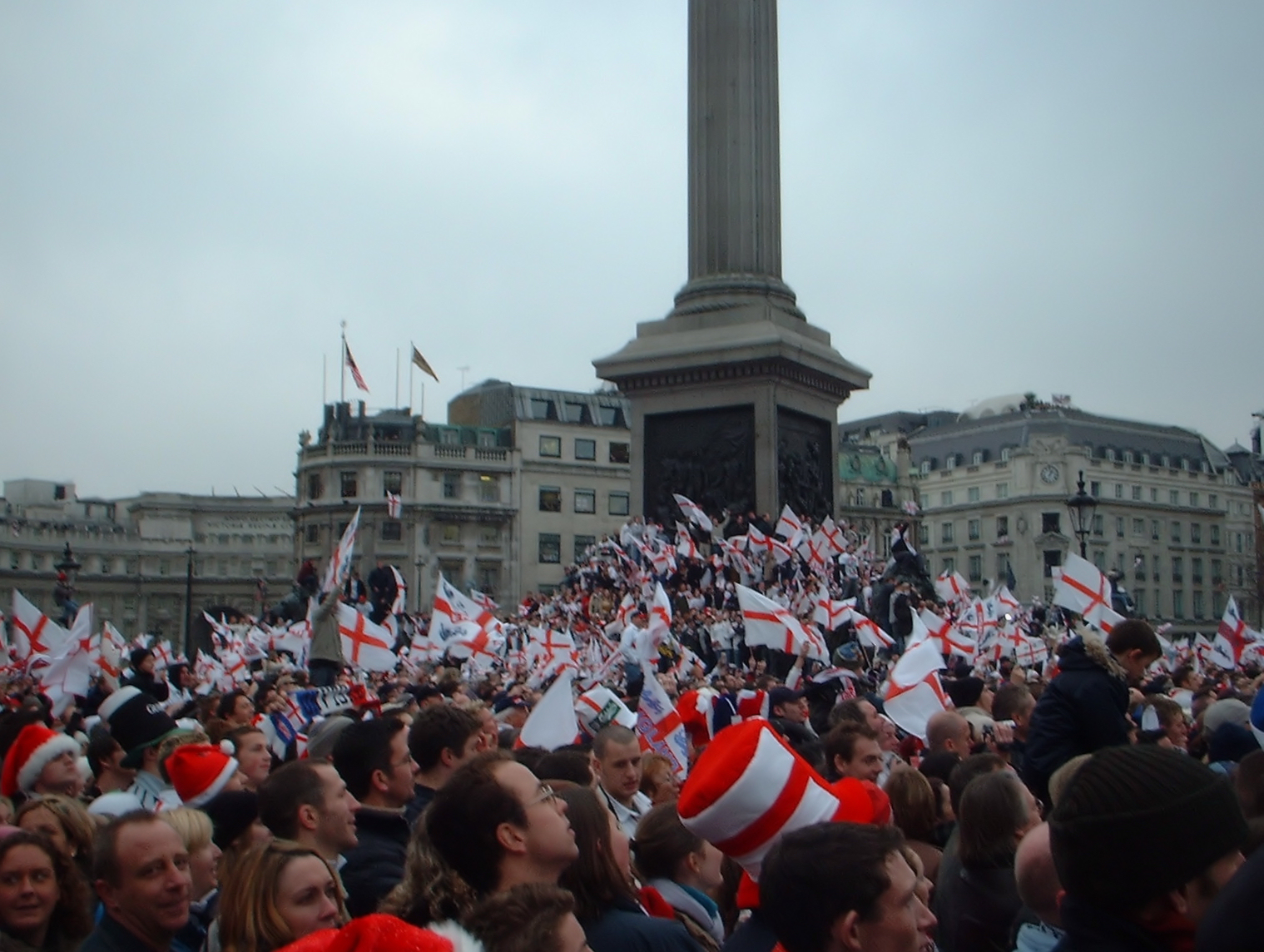
Celebrations at Trafalgar Square after England's 2003 World Cup victory

England commenced the new millennium by winning the inaugural Six Nations Championship, although they lost their last match to Scotland. They successfully defended their title the following year, but missed out on the Grand Slam by losing (14–20) to Ireland in a postponed match at Lansdowne Road. Although France won the 2002 Six Nations Championship, England defeated the other Home Nations teams to win the Triple Crown. In 2002, England beat Argentina (26–18) in Buenos Aires, and in the Autumn internationals they defeated New Zealand (31–28), Australia (32–31), and South Africa (53–3) at Twickenham. At the 2003 Six Nations Championship, England won the Grand Slam for the first time since 1995, followed by wins over Australia and the All Blacks on their June summer tour.

Going into the 2003 World Cup as one of the tournament favourites, England reached the final on 22 November 2003 against host Australia. The game went into extra time with the score tied at 14–14, after one penalty apiece and with just seconds to spare, a match-winning drop goal by fly-half Jonny Wilkinson brought the final score to 20–17, making England rugby world champions for the first time. Not only was this England's first Rugby World Cup victory, but it was the nation's first world title since the England national football team won the 1966 FIFA World Cup. On 8 December, the England team were greeted by 750,000 supporters on a victory parade through London before meeting Queen Elizabeth II at Buckingham Palace.

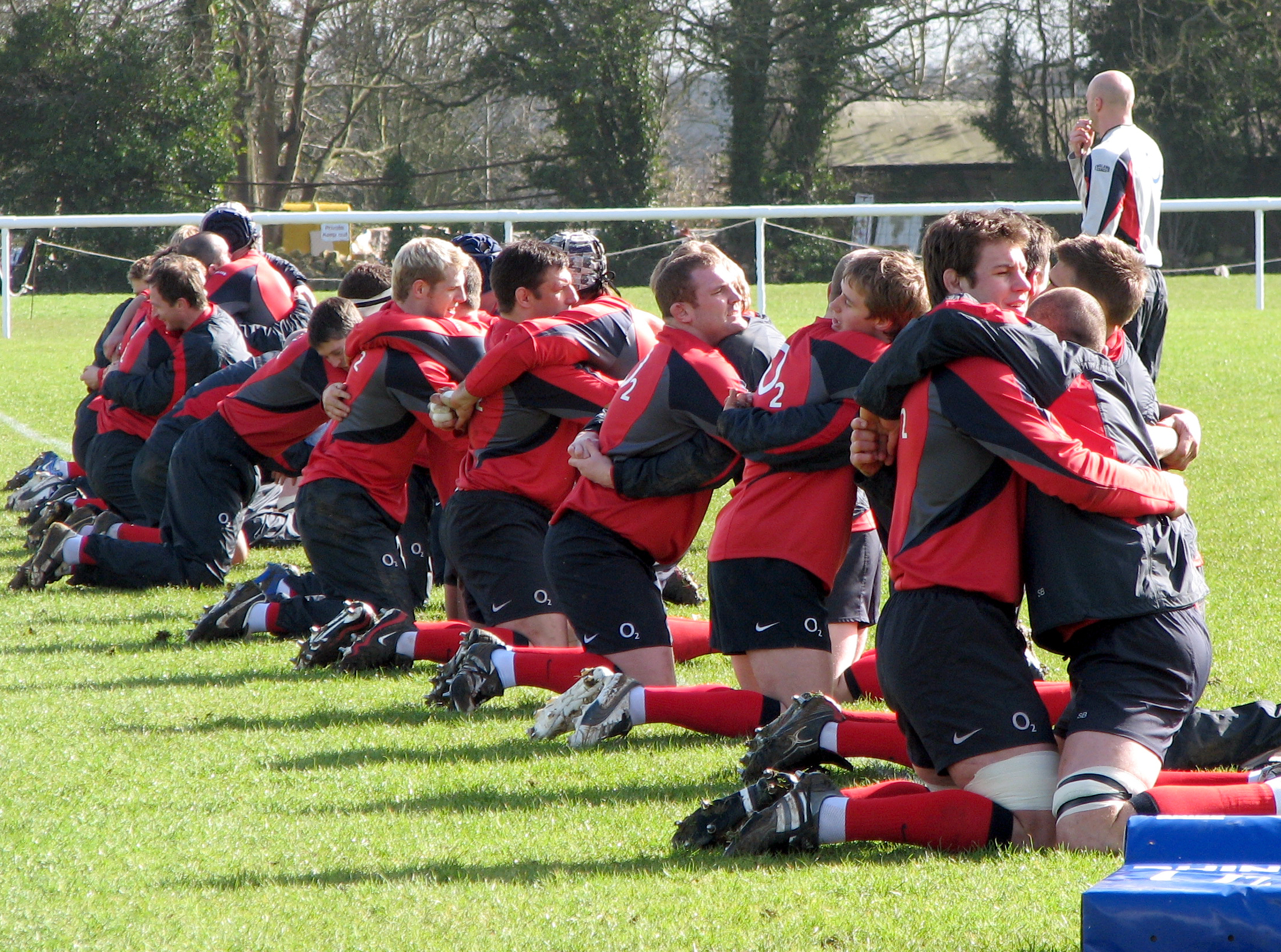
The England national squad training for the 2007 Rugby World Cup at the University of Bath

England finished third in the 2004 Six Nations Championship after losing their matches to both France and Ireland. Clive Woodward resigned as head coach on 2 September and Andy Robinson was appointed to replace him. Robinson's first Six Nations campaign in 2005 resulted in fourth place for England, and although they defeated Australia at Twickenham in the Autumn internationals, this was followed by a loss to the All Blacks.

A loss to South Africa in the 2006 Autumn internationals was England's eighth defeat in nine test matches, their worst losing streak. Andy Robinson resigned as head coach after this run, and attack coach Brian Ashton was appointed as his replacement in December. England started the 2007 Six Nations Championship with a Calcutta Cup victory over Scotland. That year's championship included a historic match at Croke Park which England lost (13–43), their heaviest defeat against Ireland.

At the 2007 World Cup, England were grouped in Pool A with Samoa, Tonga, South Africa, and the United States. They progressed to the knockout stage despite a 36–0 loss to South Africa, and narrowly defeated Australia in the quarter-finals. England then faced hosts France in the semi-finals and triumphed (14–9) to qualify for the final, where they were subjected to a second defeat by the Springboks at this World Cup, losing the match 15–6. England followed up their World Cup disappointment with two consecutive second-place finishes in the Six Nations Championship, behind Wales (2008) and Ireland (2009). Former England team captain Martin Johnson took up the job of head coach in July 2008 but, unable to replicate his on-field success in the management role, he resigned in November 2011 following a miserable Rugby World Cup which featured a series of on- and off-field controversies and ended in quarter-final defeat by France.

In March 2012, the Rugby Football Union appointed Stuart Lancaster, the former Elite Rugby Director at Leeds Carnegie, as England's head coach. He had previously been employed in the position on a short-term basis, assisted by existing forwards coach Graham Rowntree, and Andy Farrell. Lancaster was considered a success in his first campaign as head coach: defending champions England took second place in the 2012 Six Nations Championship after losing to Wales at Twickenham, but successfully defended the Calcutta Cup by defeating Scotland at Murrayfield. England finished the year on a high when they beat World Cup holders New Zealand at Twickenham in the Autumn internationals; the England team dominated the match and completely outplayed the All Blacks, who had been unbeaten in 20 matches.

At the 2013 Six Nations Championship, England again finished in second place behind Wales, and were deprived of the opportunity to win the Grand Slam for the first time since 2003 when they were defeated 30–3 by Wales in Cardiff. It was the first time since 1974 that every team in the Six Nations managed to win at least three competition points (the equivalent of a win and a draw, or three draws). However, England retained the Calcutta Cup by defeating Scotland at Twickenham. Lancaster took an experimental side on a summer tour of Argentina in 2013; after beating a South American XV on 2 June, England achieved a 2–0 series victory over Argentina, their first away series win against the Pumas for 32 years.

In 2015, England hosted the Rugby World Cup, but were eliminated in the pool stage. Despite this setback, and following the appointment of new head coach Eddie Jones, England won the Grand Slam in the 2016 Six Nations Championship, and remained unbeaten for the whole of 2016, including a series whitewash of Australia in Sydney. They went on to equal the world record of 18 consecutive test wins with a 61–21 victory over Scotland in securing the 2017 Six Nations Championship.

2018 began well for England, seeing off a spirited challenge from Italy, and winning a tight contest against Wales in the first two rounds of the Six Nations. However, it was not until June before England recorded another win, as the team lost their remaining games against Scotland, France and eventual Grand Slam winners Ireland at home in Twickenham. On their summer tour of South Africa, England lost the first two matches, before winning the third test against a mostly second-string Springbok side. That autumn, after adding former New Zealand and United States coach John Mitchell to the coaching setup, England won the return match against South Africa by a single point, and lost an equally close contest with New Zealand, both in controversial circumstances. England rounded out the year with wins over Japan and Australia. The win over Australia continued an unbroken run of victories over the Wallabies under former Australia coach Eddie Jones.

England finished second in the 2019 Six Nations Championship. They beat Ireland, France, Italy but lost to Wales and drew 38–38 with Scotland after leading 31–0. In the 2019 Rugby World Cup warm-up matches they defeated Wales at Twickenham before losing in Cardiff. They then recorded their largest win over Ireland with a 57–15 victory at Twickenham before defeating Italy at St James' Park. In the 2019 Rugby World Cup, England became the first team to qualify for the quarter-finals following a win over Argentina in Chōfu. After their final match was cancelled due to Typhoon Hagibis, England topped Pool C and faced Australia in the quarter-finals. England won the quarter-final, recording a seventh consecutive victory over Australia which resulted in the Wallabies largest ever Rugby World Cup defeat. England then defeated New Zealand in the semi-final, equalling New Zealands largest Rugby World Cup defeat with a victory in which the All Blacks were kept scoreless for 57 minutes. On 2 November 2019, England were defeated (12–32) by South Africa in the 2019 Rugby World Cup final.

In the 2020 Six Nations Championship, England were defeated in their opening game against France in Paris before recording victories against Scotland at Murrayfield and Ireland and Wales at Twickenham. The tournament was then halted due to the COVID-19 pandemic and resumed with the matches played in empty stadiums in October. In the postponed matches, England recorded a bonus point win over Italy in Rome before France defeated Ireland by eight points which meant that England won the championship on points difference. Due to the pandemic, the scheduled 2020 Autumn Internationals were replaced by the Autumn Nations Cup. England defeated Georgia, Wales and Ireland before facing France in the final match, winning after extra time at Twickenham to secure the tournament.

England finished fifth in the 2021 Six Nations Championship, beating France and Italy but losing to all three home nations for the first time since 1976 and conceding defeat to Scotland at Twickenham for the first time since 1983. In the 2021 Autumn Internationals, England played three matches at Twickenham. They secured a victory over Tonga, recorded their 8th consecutive victory over Australia (32–15) and also beat the current World Champions South Africa (27–26).

England finished third in the 2022 Six Nations Championship after defeating Italy and Wales but lost Ireland, France and Scotland. In the 2022 tour of Australia, England faced the Wallabies in a three-test series. They lost the first test match in Perth, but won the last two test matches in Brisbane, and in Sydney to win the test series 2–1. In the 2022 Autumn Internationals they lost to Argentina, beat Japan, drew with New Zealand, and lost to South Africa.

England finished fourth in the 2023 Six Nations Championship. England defeated Italy and Wales but was beaten by Scotland, France and Ireland. At the 2023 Rugby World Cup, England beat Argentina, Japan, Chile, and Samoa to go undefeated in the pool stage. In the quarter-final, they defeated Fiji before losing to the eventual champions South Africa in the semi-final. They ended their campaign with a win over Argentina in the bronze final to finish the tournament in third place.

England finished third in the 2024 Six Nations Championship. They defeated Italy, Wales and Ireland, but lost to Scotland and France. In the 2024 English tour of New Zealand, England faced the All Blacks in a two-test series. They were defeated in both test matches in Dunedin and in Auckland. In the 2024 Autumn Internationals, England lost to New Zealand, Australia, South Africa, but won against Japan.

== Home stadium ==
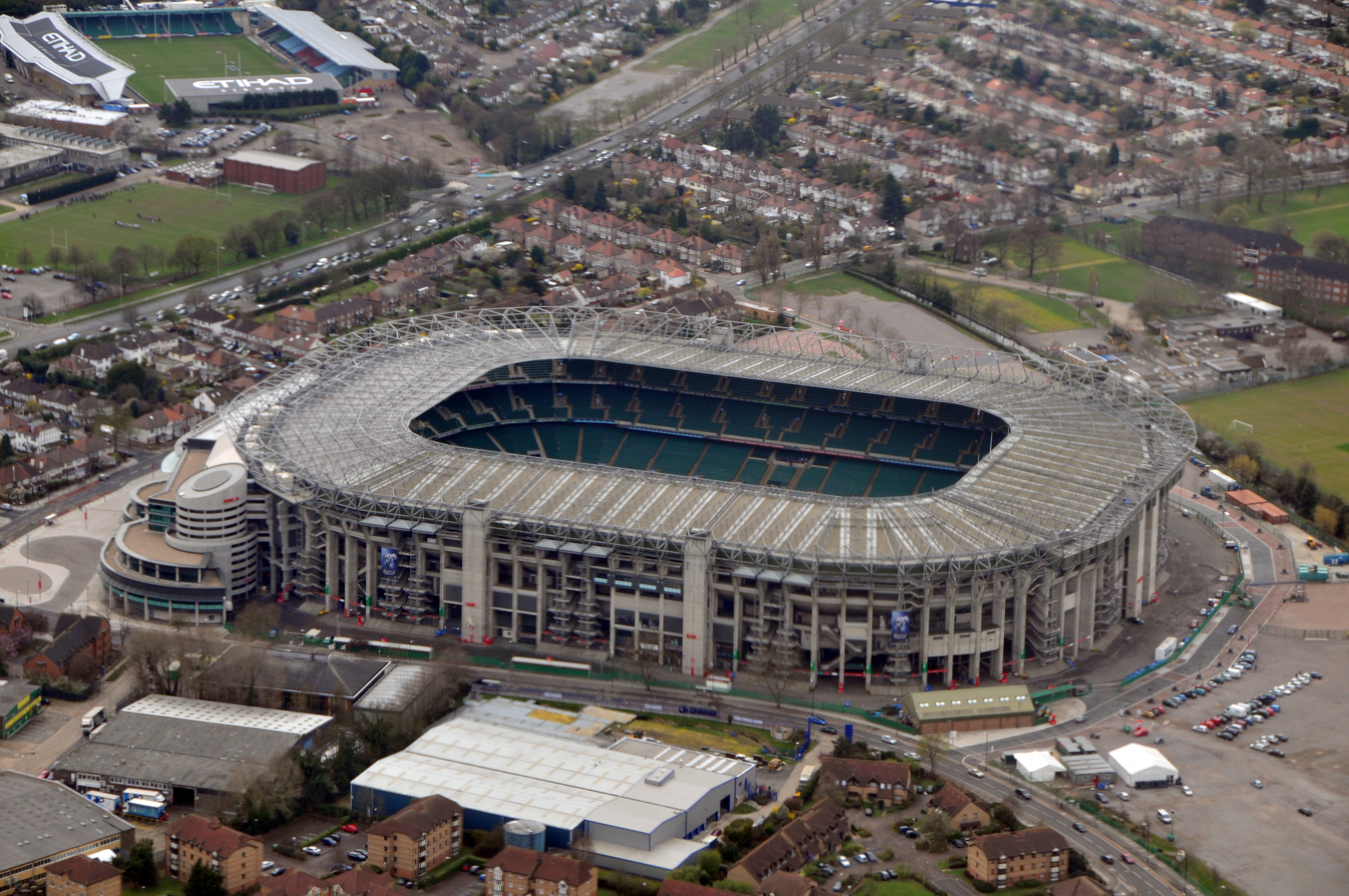
Aerial view of Twickenham Stadium

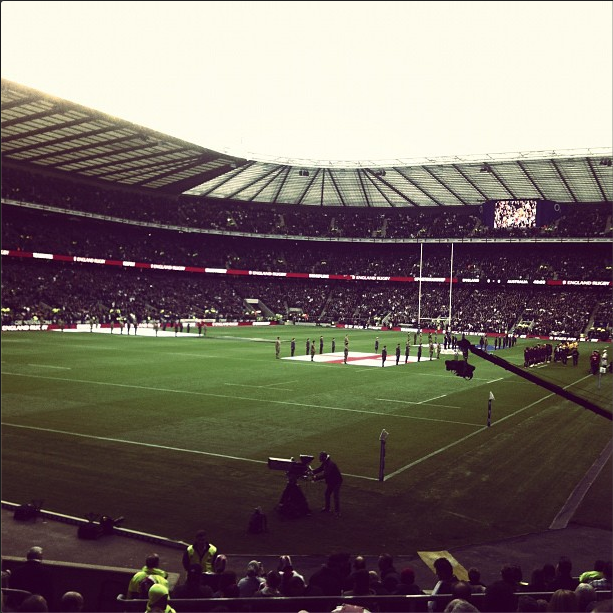
Twickenham before a match in November 2012

Twickenham is the largest dedicated rugby stadium in the world. In the early years, the English rugby team used a number of venues in several different locations around England before settling at Twickenham Stadium in 1910. After sell-out matches at Crystal Palace against New Zealand in 1905 and South Africa in 1906, the Rugby Football Union (RFU) decided to invest in their own ground and arranged for sportsman and entrepreneur Billy Williams to find a home ground for English Rugby. The land for the ground was purchased in 1907 for £5,572 12s and 6d, and construction began the following year.

The first international test match at Twickenham took place on the 15th of January 1910 between England and Wales. The home team won (11–6), beating Wales for the first time since 1898. The stadium was expanded in 1927 and again in 1932, but there were no further upgrades until 1981 when a new South stand was built and the 1990s when new North, East and West stands were built; the South stand was replaced in 2005 and 2006 to make the stadium into a complete bowl. England played their first test match at the redeveloped Twickenham on the 5th of November 2006 against the All Blacks, losing the test match (20–41), in front of a record crowd of 82,076.

The pitch at Twickenham was replaced in June 2012 with a hybrid 'Desso' type, which uses artificial fibres entwined with real grass. This type of pitch surface is particularly hard wearing in wet conditions.

=== England home matches outside Twickenham ===
Although England have played home matches almost exclusively at Twickenham since 1910, they have occasionally used alternative English venues. England home matches have been hosted at Leicester's Welford Road (1923), London's Wembley Stadium (1992), Old Trafford (1997 and 2009), Huddersfield's McAlpine Stadium (twice in 1998), Manchester's Etihad Stadium (2015), and St James' Park in Newcastle upon Tyne (2019).

Date	Team	Result	Venue	Ref.
2nd December 1905	New Zealand	0–15	Crystal Palace, London	
10 February 1923	Ireland	23–5	Welford Road, Leicester	
17 October 1992	Canada	26–13	Wembley Stadium, London	
22 November 1997	New Zealand	8–25	Old Trafford, Manchester	
14 November 1998	Netherlands	110–0	McAlpine Stadium, Huddersfield	
22 November 1998	Italy	23–15	McAlpine Stadium, Huddersfield	
6 June 2009	Argentina	37–15	Old Trafford, Manchester^{[a]}	
10 October 2015	Uruguay	60–3	Etihad Stadium, Manchester^{[b]}	
6 September 2019	Italy	37–0	St James' Park, Newcastle upon Tyne	
11 July 2026	Fiji	73–8	Hill Dickinson Stadium, Liverpool^{[c]}	

^{a} The first of a two-test series, this match was originally scheduled to be held in Argentina but moved by the Argentine Rugby Union for financial reasons.
^{b} This was a Pool A match at the 2015 Rugby World Cup.
^{c} A 'home' match for Fiji in the 2026 Nations Championship due to financial reasons.

England also played a Five Nations match against Wales at Wembley Stadium on 11 April 1999. Wales was the "home team" on this occasion because Wembley was being used as a temporary base while their new stadium in Cardiff was being constructed. Wales won the match (32–31).

=== "Swing Low, Sweet Chariot" ===
"Swing Low, Sweet Chariot" is commonly sung at England fixtures, especially at Twickenham. In the last match of the 1988 season, against Ireland, three of England's tries were scored by Chris Oti. A group of boys from the Benedictine school Douai, following a tradition at their school games, sang the song on his final try, and other spectators around the ground joined in. Since then "Swing Low, Sweet Chariot" became a song to sing at England home games. In 1991, the RFU marketing director Mike Coley wanted the team to launch a song leading up to that year's Rugby World Cup. He had wanted to use "Jerusalem", but it was used in the Rugby League Challenge Cup final that year, so the song was changed at short notice to "Swing Low". There were a number of versions recorded and the version released did reach the top 40 in the UK Singles Chart during the competition.

== Playing kit ==
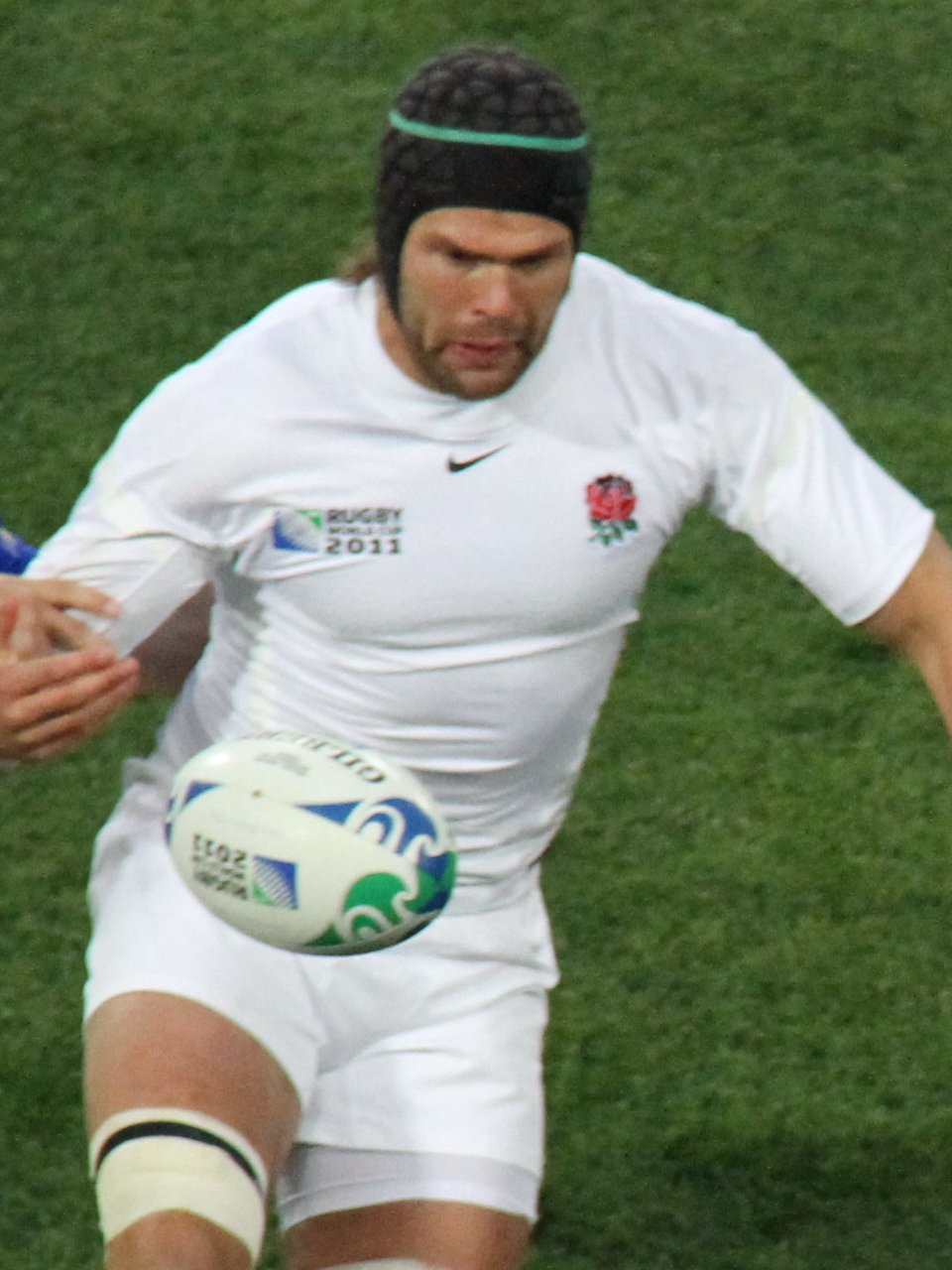
Tom Palmer wearing the traditional white England shirt at the 2011 World Cup

England rugby union players typically wear all-white jerseys and white shorts, with predominantly navy blue socks. The emblem on the jerseys is a red rose. As of May 2025, the strip is manufactured by Castore and the shirt sponsor is O_{2}. The away strip is usually red or dark grey (described as "anthracite"); prior to the introduction of the grey strip, red was the traditional change colour. Navy blue has also been used in the past and was reintroduced for the 2016–17 and 2020–21 seasons. Purple was used during the 2009 autumn internationals, reflecting the traditional colour of the original England tracksuits from the 1960s until the 1980s. The away strip was black for the first time during the 2011 Rugby World Cup. About that kit, the RFU stated that they had requested approval from the New Zealand Union, which said "it has no qualms with England wearing the strip".

The red rose has been the emblem of England since the first international v Scotland in 1871

The Rugby Football Union (RFU) had created the national side's emblem prior to an English team being sent to Edinburgh to play a Scottish side. A red rose was chosen to be the side's emblem. The white kit worn by the national team in 1871 is said to have been taken from that used by Rugby School, however the School's matches against outside opponents were played in red, white and blue jerseys until 1876.

Alfred Wright, an employee of the Rugby Football Union, is credited with the standardisation and new design of the rose, which up until 1920 had undergone many variations in its depiction. The Wright design is thought to have been used without minor alteration until the late 1990s. It was not until 1997 that the rose was modernised, when Nike became the official strip supplier (with the stem section of the rose being green rather than brown as previously).

In 2003, England first used a skin-tight strip. This was intended to make it more difficult for the opposition to grasp the shirt when tackling.

=== Kit providers ===
Year	Kit manufacturer	Main shirt sponsor	Shirt sub sponsor(s)
1960s	(England) Lillywhites	—	None
1970s–1983	(England) Umbro	—	None
1984–1990	(England) Bukta	—	None
1991–1997	(England) Cotton Traders	BT Cellnet (1996–June 2002)	None
1997–2012	(United States) Nike	O2 (June 2002–present)	None
2012–2020	(New Zealand) Canterbury	O2 (June 2002–present)	None
2020–2025	(England) Umbro	O2 (June 2002–present)	None
2025–present	(England) Castore	O2 (June 2002–present)	Lloyds (back shirt)

== Performances ==
=== Six Nations ===
England competes annually in the Six Nations Championship, which is played against five other European nations: France, Ireland, Italy, Scotland, and Wales. The Six Nations started out as the Home Nations Championship in 1883 which England won with a Triple Crown. England have won the title outright 29 times (a record for the tournament) and shared victory ten times. Their longest wait between championships was 18 years (1892–1910). During the Six Nations, England also contests the Calcutta Cup with Scotland (which England first won in 1880) and the Millennium Trophy with Ireland (which England first won in 1988). The matches between England and France are traditionally known as "Le Crunch".

	England	France	Ireland	Italy	Scotland	Wales
Tournaments	130	97	132	27	132	132
Outright wins (shared wins)
Home Nations	5 (4)	—N/a	4 (3)	—N/a	9 (2)	7 (3)
Five Nations	17 (6)	12 (8)	6 (5)	—N/a	5 (6)	15 (8)
Six Nations	7	8	6	0	0	6
Overall	29 (10)	20 (8)	16 (8)	0 (0)	14 (8)	28 (11)
Grand Slams
Home Nations	—N/a	—N/a	—N/a	—N/a	—N/a	2
Five Nations	11	6	1	—N/a	3	6
Six Nations	2	4	3	0	0	4
Overall	13	10	4	0	3	12
Triple Crowns
Home Nations	5	—N/a	2	—N/a	7	6
Five Nations	16	—N/a	4	—N/a	3	11
Six Nations	5	—N/a	9	—N/a	0	5
Overall	26	—N/a	15	—N/a	10	22
Wooden Spoons
Home Nations	7	—N/a	10	—N/a	5	6
Five Nations	10	12	15	—N/a	15	10
Six Nations	0	1	0	18	4	4
Overall	17	13	25	18	24	20

Note: England are the only team to have won more than two successive grand slams, on more than one occasion, doing so in 1913–1914, 1923–1924 and 1991–1992; while Wales and France the only other teams to have done so twice, in 1908–1909 for Wales and 1997–1998 for France.

=== Test series victories ===
Argentina (5) - 1981, 2002, 2013, 2017, 2025

Australia (2) - 2016, 2022

Canada (1) - 2001

Ceylon (1) - 1971

Fiji (3) - 1973, 1989, 1991

Japan (2) - 1971, 1979

Romania (1) - 1989

United States (2) - 2001, 2025

=== Test series draws ===
Argentina (2) - 1990, 1997

Australia (1) - 2010

Canada (1) - 1993

South Africa (2) - 1994, 2000

=== Rugby World Cup ===
Rugby World Cup record									Qualification						
Year	Round	Pld	W	D	L	PF	PA	Squad	Pos	Pld	W	D	L	PF	PA
(New Zealand) (Australia) 1987	Quarter-finals	4	2	0	2	103	48	Squad	Invited						
(England) (France) (Ireland) (Scotland) (Wales) 1991	Runners–up	6	4	0	2	119	61	Squad	Automatically qualified						
(South Africa) 1995	Fourth place	6	4	0	2	158	146	Squad	Automatically qualified						
(Wales) 1999	Quarter-finals	5	3	0	2	250	115	Squad	1st	2	2	0	0	133	15
(Australia) 2003	Champions	7	7	0	0	327	88	Squad	Automatically qualified						
(France) 2007	Runners–up	7	5	0	2	140	122	Squad	Automatically qualified						
(New Zealand) 2011	Quarter-finals	5	4	0	1	149	53	Squad	Automatically qualified						
(England) 2015	Pool stage	4	2	0	2	133	75	Squad	Automatically qualified						
(Japan) 2019	Runners–up	7	5	1	1	190	75	Squad	Automatically qualified						
(France) 2023	Third place	7	6	0	1	221	102	Squad	Automatically qualified						
(Australia) 2027	Qualified								Automatically qualified						
(United States) 2031	To be determined								To be determined						
Total	—	58	42	1	15	1790	885	—	—	2	2	0	0	133	15
Champions; Runners–up; Third place; Fourth place; Home venue

During Typhoon Hagibis; England v France was to be cancelled and recorded as 0–0 draw

England have contested every Rugby World Cup since the tournament began in 1987, reaching the final four times and winning the title in the 2003 tournament.

In the inaugural tournament, England finished second in their pool before losing to Wales (3–16) in the quarter-finals. They again finished pool runners-up in 1991 but bounced back to beat France (19–10) in the quarter-finals, and then Scotland (9–6) in the semi-finals, en route to a (6–12) defeat to Australia in the final at Twickenham on 2 November 1991.

In 1995, England topped their pool and defeated Australia (25–22) at the quarter-final stage before being beaten by the All Blacks (29–45) in the semi-finals. They lost their bronze medal match (9–19) to France.

In the 1999 tournament, England again finished second in their pool. Although they proceeded to win a play-off game against Fiji (45–24), they went out of the tournament in the quarter-finals, losing (21–44) to South Africa.

England topped their pool in 2003 and progressed to the playoffs. They beat Wales (28–17) and France (24–7) in the quarter and semi-finals. With a drop goal in the last minute of extra time, England won the final (20–17) against Australia in Sydney on 22 November 2003.

England made a poor start to their title defence in 2007, with a below par victory over the United States and a heavy (0–36) defeat to South Africa, leaving the title holders on the brink of elimination at the pool stage. Improved performances against Samoa and Tonga ensured that England again reached the knockout stage as pool runners-up. They defeated Australia (12–10) in the quarter-finals, and beat France (14–9) in the semi-finals. The victory over France gave England the chance to play in their 2nd consecutive final. In the final, held in Paris on 20 October, England lost (6–15) to South Africa, their second defeat by the Springboks during the 2007 tournament.

England topped their pool in 2011. They reached the quarter-finals but were defeated (12–19) to France.

In 2015, England became the first host nation to fail to qualify for the knockout stage, after losing to Wales and Australia in the pool stage.

In 2019, England topped their pool. They defeated Australia (40–19) and New Zealand (19–7) in the knockout stage. On 2 November 2019, they suffered a (12–32) defeat to South Africa in the final in Yokohama, becoming World Cup runners-up for the third time in their history.

In 2023, England topped their pool. They defeated Fiji in the quarter-finals (30–24) before losing to the eventual champions South Africa (15–16) in the semi-finals. They beat Argentina in the bronze medal match (26–23) to finish the tournament in 3rd place.

England's Jonny Wilkinson is the highest points scorer in the Rugby World Cup, having scored 277 points between 1999 and 2011. England have the fourth most points and the fourth most tries scored in the Rugby World Cup.

=== Recent results ===
The following is a list of England's recent match results, as well as upcoming scheduled fixtures, during the 12 months up to the end of 2026:

Win Draw Loss Upcoming

7 February 2026	England	48–7	Wales	Allianz Stadium, London
16:40 GMT (UTC+0)	Try: Arundell (3) 7' c, 18' m, 35' c Earl 23' c Roebuck 44' c Penalty try 66'; Freeman 79' m Con: Ford (4/6) 8', 24', 36', 45'; Pen: Ford (1/1) 2'	Report	Try: Adams 51' c Con: Edwards (1/1) 52'	Attendance: 81,953; Referee: Pierre Brousset (France)

14 February 2026	Scotland	31–20	England	Murrayfield Stadium, Edinburgh
16:40 GMT (UTC+0)	Try: Jones (2) 9' c, 52' c Ritchie 13' c White 26' c Con: Russell (4/4) 10', 14', 27', 53'; Pen: Russell (1/1) 3'	Report	Try: Arundell 20' c Earl 77' c Con: Ford (2/2) 21', 78'; Pen: Ford (2/2) 25', 44'	Attendance: 67,144; Referee: Nika Amashukeli (Georgia)

21 February 2026	England	21–42	Ireland	Allianz Stadium, London
14:10 GMT (UTC+0)	Try: Dingwall 40' c Lawrence 53' c Underhill 75' c Con: Ford (3/3) 40+1', 53', 76'	Report	Try: Gibson-Park 19' c Baloucoune 26' m O'Brien 29' c Sheehan 42' c Osborne 69' c Con: Crowley (4/5) 20', 30', 43', 70'; Pen: Crowley (3/4) 8', 58', 65'	Attendance: 81,953; Referee: Andrea Piardi (Italy)

7 March 2026	Italy	23–18	England	Stadio Olimpico, Rome
17:40 CET (UTC+1)	Try: Menocello 34' c Marin 72' c Con: P. Garbisi (2/2) 35', 73'; Pen: P. Garbisi (3/3) 21', 57', 61'	Report	Try: Freeman 26' m Roebuck 42' c Con: F. Smith (1/2) 43'; Pen: F. Smith (2/2) 45', 54'	Attendance: 68,985; Referee: Luc Ramos (France)

14 March 2026	France	48–46	England	Stade de France, Saint-Denis
21:10 CET (UTC+1)	Try: Bielle-Biarrey (4) 7' c, 13' c, 42' c, 66' c Penalty try 40'; Attissogbe 49' c Con: Ramos (5/5) 8', 14', 43', 50', 66'; Pen: Ramos (2/2) 23', 80+3'	Report	Try: Roebuck 10' m Murley 19' m Chessum (2) 26' c, 51' m Coles 34' c M. Smith 57' c Freeman 77' c Con: F. Smith (2/5) 27', 35'; M. Smith (2/2) 58', 78'; Pen: F. Smith (1/1) 38'	Attendance: 78,728; Referee: Nika Amashukeli (Georgia)

4 July 2026	South Africa	45–21	England	Ellis Park Stadium, Johannesburg
17:40 SAST (UTC+2)	Try: T. du Toit 2' m Kolbe 5' c Arendse 11' m Williams 44' c Kriel 56' c Marx 73' c Dixon 78' c Con: Kolbe (5/7) 6', 45', 57', 74', 79'	Report	Try: Genge 35' c Martin 40+1' c Coles 67' c Con: F. Smith (3/3) 36', 40+2', 68'	Attendance: 52,790; Referee: James Doleman (New Zealand)

11 July 2026	Fiji	8–73	England	Hill Dickinson Stadium, Liverpool
14:10 BST (UTC+1)	Try: Ikanivere 47' m Pen: Muntz (1/1) 12'	Report	Try: M. Smith 5' c George 14' c Pepper 27' c Janse van Rensburg 34' c Atkinson 37' c Feyi-Waboso 53' c Pollock (3) 55' m, 67' c, 79' c Slade 59' c Caluori 64' m Con: F. Smith (9/11) 6', 15', 28', 35', 38', 54', 60', 68', 80'	Attendance: 50,209; Referee: Hollie Davidson (Scotland)

18 July 2026	Argentina	24–31	England	Estadio Único Madre de Ciudades, Santiago del Estero
16:00 ART (UTC-03)	Try: M. Carreras 43' c Penalty try 55'; Piccardo 79' c Con: Albornoz (2/2) 44', 80'; Pen: Albornoz (1/1) 30'	Report	Try: Freeman 3' m Earl (2) 23' c, 33' c M. Smith 62' c Feyi-Waboso 68' m Con: F. Smith (3/5) 24', 34', 63'	Attendance: 22,225; Referee: Angus Gardner (Australia)

8 November 2026	England	45–22	Australia	Allianz Stadium, London
15:10 GMT (UTC+0)	Try: George 7' m Chessum 25' c Heyes 32' c van Poortvliet 42' c Pollock (2) 54' m, 56' c Spencer 75' c Con: F. Smith (5/7) 26', 33', 43', 57', 76'	Report	Try: Jorgensen 39' c Daugunu 61' m Williams 73' c Con: Lonergan (1/2) 40'; Donaldson (1/1) 74'; Pen: Lonergan (1/1) 11'	Attendance: 81,331; Referee: Pierre Brousset (France)

14 November 2026	England	78–15	Japan	Allianz Stadium, London
16:40 GMT (UTC+0)	Try: Joseph (5) 1' m, 10' m, 20' m, 25' m, 56' c Steward 15' c Genge 19' c Murley 29' m Earl 40' c Martin 45' m Curry 64' m M. Smith 68' c Fisilau 73' m Con: Ford (3/9) 15', 19', 40+1'; Slade (2/4) 57', 69'; Pen: Ford (1/1) 8'	Report	Try: Dearns 37' c Helu 48' m Con: Saitō (1/2) 38'; Pen: Saitō (1/1) 14'	Attendance: 81,552; Referee: Damián Schneider (Argentina)

21 November 2026	England	37–12	New Zealand	Allianz Stadium, London
14:10 GMT (UTC+0)	Try: Slade 5' m van Poortvliet 32' c Earl 36' c Chessum 43' m Atkinson 63' c Con: F. Smith (2/4) 33', 37'; M. Smith (1/1) 64'; Pen: M. Smith (2/2) 57', 80+1'	Report	Try: de Groot 39' m B. Barrett 52' c Con: McKenzie (1/2) 53'	Attendance: 81,953; Referee: Nic Berry (Australia)

28 November 2026	England	v	New Zealand	Allianz Stadium, London
16:40 GMT (UTC+0)

=== Overall ===
Men's World Rugby Rankings Top 20 as of 16 November 2026
Rank	Change (Note: Change from the previous week)	Team	Points
1	Steady	South Africa	91.53
2	Steady	New Zealand	90.65
3	▲1	France	89.05
4	▼1	Ireland	88.70
5	Steady	England	86.99
6	Steady	Scotland	85.28
7	Steady	Australia	82.24
8	Steady	Argentina	82.09
9	▲1	Wales	79.37
10	▼1	Fiji	77.79
11	Steady	Italy	75.84
12	Steady	Japan	75.25
13	Steady	Georgia	74.23
14	▲1	United States	68.39
15	▼1	Portugal	68.24
16	▲3	Samoa	67.60
17	▲1	Chile	67.00
18	▼2	Spain	66.53
19	▼2	Tonga	65.58
20	Steady	Uruguay	65.17

England's historical rankings

Source: World Rugby
Graph updated to 16 November 2026

When the World Rugby Rankings were first introduced in early September 2003, England were ranked 1st; they fell to 2nd for a week in November 2003 before regaining 1st place. They again dropped to 2nd in the rankings, and then to 3rd, from mid-June 2004. Following the 2005 Six Nations, they fell to 6th in the world rankings, where they remained until moving up to 5th place in December of that year. After a decline in form in 2006, England finished the year ranked 7th; however, they bounced back to 3rd in 2007 due to their good run in that year's World Cup, where they finished runners-up.

Their ranking slipped again in 2008 and during the 2009 Six Nations they dropped to their lowest ranking of 8th, where they remained for the duration of the 2009 autumn internationals. After a brief resurgence that saw them rise to a ranking of 4th in the world, England again slipped following a poor showing at the 2011 Rugby World Cup and were ranked 6th in February 2012. The team entered the 2015 Rugby World Cup ranked 4th, but after failing to progress beyond the pool stage, England again sank to 8th in the world in November 2015. In March 2016, after securing the Grand Slam in the 2016 Six Nations, England rose to second place, where they remained the following year after winning the 2017 Six Nations. A poor fifth-place performance in the 2018 Six Nations saw them fall to sixth place.

In October 2019, England defeated New Zealand in the semi-final of the 2019 Rugby World Cup to top the World Rugby Rankings for the first time since 2004. After losing the final to South Africa, England were ranked third. In November 2020, they regained second place following New Zealand's loss to Argentina.

During the 2021 Six Nations, a fifth-place finish saw England fall from second to third after defeats to Scotland, Wales and Ireland. After Australia won 5 matches in a row during the 2021 Rugby Championship, England fell to fourth until defeats of Australia and South Africa in the 2021 Autumn Nations Series saw them regain third place.

During the 2022 Six Nations, England again suffered three defeats to Scotland, Ireland and France and fell from third to fifth.

England entered the 2023 Six Nations in fifth, but defeats to Scotland, France and Ireland again saw them fall to sixth.

During the 2023 World Cup warm-ups, England suffered further defeats away to Ireland and Wales and a first ever home loss to Fiji to enter the 2023 World Cup in eighth. A third-placed finish at the 2023 Rugby World Cup saw England rise to fifth.

During the 2024 Six Nations, England retained fifth position despite away defeats against Scotland and France.

England have won 458 of their 820 Test Matches, with a 55.85% win percentage. Below is a summary table of test matches played by England up to 17 July 2026. Only fixtures recognised as test matches by the RFU are included.

Opponent	Pld	W	D	L	Win %	PF	PA	PD
Argentina	30	24	1	5	80%	814	488	326
Australia	57	29	1	27	51%	1,092	1,204	−112
Canada	9	8	0	1	89%	343	87	256
Chile	1	1	0	0	100%	71	0	71
Fiji	10	9	0	1	90%	393	181	212
France	113	61	7	45	54%	1,867	1,563	304
Georgia	3	3	0	0	100%	165	16	149
Ireland	144	81	8	55	56%	1,806	1,383	423
Italy	33	32	0	1	97%	1,289	427	862
Japan	6	6	0	0	100%	292	78	214
Netherlands	1	1	0	0	100%	110	0	110
New Zealand	47	9	2	36	19%	706	1,100	−394
New Zealand Natives	1	1	0	0	100%	7	0	7
Pacific Islanders	1	1	0	0	100%	39	13	26
Presidents XV	1	0	0	1	0%	11	28	−17
Romania	5	5	0	0	100%	335	24	311
Samoa	9	9	0	0	100%	310	131	179
Scotland	144	77	19	48	53%	1,790	1,367	423
South Africa	47	16	2	29	34%	804	1,017	−213
Tonga	4	4	0	0	100%	241	36	205
United States	8	8	0	0	100%	381	93	288
Uruguay	2	2	0	0	100%	171	16	155
Wales	144	71	12	61	49%	2,042	1,804	238
Total	820	458	52	310	55.85%	15,079	11,056	+4,023

== Players ==
=== Current squad ===
On 2 November 2026, England named a 36-player squad for the 2026 Nations Championship Northern Hemisphere Series.

- Caps updated: 21 November 2026

Head coach: (England) Steve Borthwick

Player	Position	Date of birth (age)	Caps	Club/province
Jamie George	Hooker	20 October 1990 (age 36)	115	(England) Saracens
Luke Cowan-Dickie	Hooker	20 June 1993 (age 33)	64	(England) Sale Sharks
Theo Dan	Hooker	26 December 2000 (age 25)	21	(England) Saracens
Ellis Genge	Prop	16 February 1995 (age 31)	86	(England) Bristol Bears
Will Stuart	Prop	12 July 1996 (age 30)	55	(England) Bath
Joe Heyes	Prop	13 April 1999 (age 27)	28	(England) Leicester Tigers
Fin Baxter	Prop	12 February 2002 (age 24)	20	(England) Harlequins
Asher Opoku-Fordjour	Prop	16 July 2004 (age 22)	9	(England) Sale Sharks
Emmanuel Iyogun	Prop	24 November 2000 (age 25)	2	(England) Northampton Saints
Maro Itoje (c)	Lock	28 October 1994 (age 32)	105	(England) Saracens
Ollie Chessum	Lock	6 September 2000 (age 26)	40	(England) Leicester Tigers
George Martin	Lock	18 June 2001 (age 25)	27	(England) Saracens
Alex Coles	Lock	21 September 1999 (age 27)	25	(England) Northampton Saints
Arthur Clark	Lock	19 December 2001 (age 24)	2	(England) Gloucester
Tom Curry	Back row	15 June 1998 (age 28)	71	(England) Sale Sharks
Ben Earl	Back row	7 January 1998 (age 28)	57	(England) Saracens
Ben Curry	Back row	15 June 1998 (age 28)	17	(England) Sale Sharks
Henry Pollock	Back row	14 January 2005 (age 21)	16	(England) Northampton Saints
Tom Pearson	Back row	26 October 1999 (age 27)	1	(England) Northampton Saints
Greg Fisilau	Back row	9 July 2003 (age 23)	3	(England) Exeter Chiefs
Jack van Poortvliet	Scrum-half	15 May 2001 (age 25)	30	(England) Leicester Tigers
Ben Spencer	Scrum-half	31 July 1992 (age 34)	21	(England) Bath
Harry Randall	Scrum-half	18 December 1997 (age 28)	14	(England) Bristol Bears
George Ford	Fly-half	16 March 1993 (age 33)	109	(England) Sale Sharks
Marcus Smith	Fly-half	14 February 1999 (age 27)	56	(England) Harlequins
Fin Smith	Fly-half	11 May 2002 (age 24)	21	(England) Northampton Saints
Henry Slade	Centre	19 March 1993 (age 33)	80	(England) Exeter Chiefs
Joe Marchant	Centre	16 July 1996 (age 30)	26	(England) Sale Sharks
Fraser Dingwall	Centre	7 April 1999 (age 27)	10	(England) Northampton Saints
Seb Atkinson	Centre	21 May 2002 (age 24)	9	(England) Gloucester
Will Joseph	Centre	15 July 2002 (age 24)	3	(England) Gloucester
Tommy Freeman	Wing	5 March 2001 (age 25)	31	(England) Northampton Saints
Immanuel Feyi-Waboso	Wing	20 December 2002 (age 23)	17	(England) Exeter Chiefs
Cadan Murley	Wing	31 January 1999 (age 27)	9	(England) Harlequins
Freddie Steward	Fullback	5 December 2000 (age 25)	45	(England) Leicester Tigers
George Furbank	Fullback	17 October 1996 (age 30)	16	(England) Harlequins

=== Contracted players ===
On 11 August 2026, the RFU announced the 25 England players who had been awarded Enhanced Elite Player Squad (EPS) contracts for the 2026–27 season.

Enhanced EPS Contracted Players (2026–27)
Props: Fin Baxter; Ellis Genge; Joe Heyes; Asher Opoku-Fordjour; Will Stuart; Hookers: Luke Cowan-Dickie; Jamie George; Locks: Ollie Chessum; Alex Coles; Maro Itoje; George Martin	Back row: Tom Curry; Ben Earl; Guy Pepper; Henry Pollock; Scrum-halves: Alex Mitchell; Jack van Poortvliet; Fly-halves: George Ford; Fin Smith; Marcus Smith	Centres: Seb Atkinson; Henry Slade; Wings: Immanuel Feyi-Waboso; Tommy Freeman; Full-backs: George Furbank

=== Notable players ===
Five former England representatives have been inducted into the International Rugby Hall of Fame – Bill Beaumont, Martin Johnson, Jason Leonard, Wavell Wakefield and Jonny Wilkinson.

Seven former England internationals are also members of the IRB Hall of Fame. Four of them – Johnson, Alan Rotherham, Harry Vassall and Robert Seddon – were inducted for their accomplishments as players. Two other former England players, John Kendall-Carpenter and Clive Woodward, were inducted into the IRB Hall for non-playing accomplishments in the sport. Another former England player, Alfred St. George Hamersley, was inducted for achievements as both a player and a rugby administrator.

== Individual records ==
=== World Rugby Awards ===
The following England players have been recognised at the World Rugby Awards since 2001:

World Rugby Player of the Year
Year	Nominees	Winners
2001	Jonny Wilkinson	—
2002	Jason Robinson	—
2003	Steve Thompson	**Jonny Wilkinson**
2003	Jonny Wilkinson (2)	**Jonny Wilkinson**
2009	Tom Croft	—
2012	Owen Farrell	—
2016	Owen Farrell (2)	—
2016	Maro Itoje	—
2016	Billy Vunipola	—
2017	Owen Farrell (3)	—
2017	Maro Itoje (2)	—
2019	Tom Curry	—
2021	Maro Itoje (3)	—

World Rugby Breakthrough Player of the Year
Year	Nominees	Winners
2016	Maro Itoje	**Maro Itoje**
2019	Joe Cokanasiga	—
2021	Marcus Smith	—
2022	Henry Arundell	—
2024	Immanuel Feyi-Waboso	—
2025	Henry Pollock	—

World Rugby Dream Team of the Year
Year	No.	Players
2021	4.	Maro Itoje
2022	1.	Ellis Genge
2022	15.	Freddie Steward
2025	4.	Maro Itoje (2)
2025	7.	Tom Curry

World Rugby Try of the Year
Year	Date	Scorer	Match	Tournament	Ref
2010	13 November	**Chris Ashton**	vs. Australia	2010 end-of-year rugby union internationals	

=== Six Nations Player of the Championship ===
The following England players have been shortlisted for the Six Nations Player of the Championship since 2004:

Six Nations Player of the Year (2004–13)
Year	Nominees	Winners
2004	Ben Cohen	—
2004	Lawrence Dallaglio	—
2004	Danny Grewcock	—
2005	Martin Corry	—
2005	Josh Lewsey	—
2006	Martin Corry (2)	—
2006	Charlie Hodgson	—
2007	Josh Lewsey (2)	—
2007	Joe Worsley	—
2009	Delon Armitage	—
2011	Chris Ashton	—
2011	Toby Flood	—
2011	James Haskell	—
2011	Tom Palmer	—
2013	Owen Farrell	—
2013	Chris Robshaw	—

Six Nations Player of the Year (2014–19)
Year	Nominees	Winners
2014	Mike Brown	**Mike Brown**
2014	Danny Care	**Mike Brown**
2014	Owen Farrell (2)	**Mike Brown**
2014	Chris Robshaw (2)	**Mike Brown**
2015	George Ford	—
2015	Jonathan Joseph	—
2015	Billy Vunipola	—
2015	Ben Youngs	—
2016	Jonathan Joseph (2)	—
2016	Jack Nowell	—
2016	Billy Vunipola (2)	—
2017	Owen Farrell (3)	—
2017	Maro Itoje	—
2017	Joe Launchbury	—
2019	Tom Curry	—
2019	Jonny May	—

Six Nations Player of the Year (2020–)
Year	Nominees	Winners
2020	Maro Itoje (2)	—
2020	Ben Youngs (2)	—
2024	Ben Earl	—
2025	Tommy Freeman	—

Six Nations Team of the Championship
Year	Forwards		Backs		Total	Refs
Year	No.	Players	No.	Players	Total	Refs
2022	4	Maro Itoje	—		**1**	
2024	8	Ben Earl	—		**1**	
2025	3	Will Stuart	10	Fin Smith	**5**	
2025	4	Maro Itoje (2)	14	Tommy Freeman	**5**	
2025	6	Tom Curry	14	Tommy Freeman	**5**	

=== Rugby Players' Association Player of the Year ===
The following players have been voted as the RPA England Player of the Year since 2013:

RPA Player of the Year (2013–17)
Year	Winners	Ref
2013	Joe Launchbury	
2014	Mike Brown	
2015	Jonathan Joseph	
2016	Billy Vunipola	
2017	Owen Farrell	

RPA Player of the Year (2018–22)
Year	Winners	Ref
2018	Mako Vunipola	
2019	Jonny May	
2020	Tom Curry	
2021	Tom Curry (2)	
2022	Freddie Steward	

RPA Player of the Year (2023–26)
Year	Winners	Ref
2023	Freddie Steward (2)	
2024	Ben Earl	
2025	Tommy Freeman	
2026	Joe Heyes	

=== Statistical leaders ===
- Ben Youngs holds the record for most appearances for England, with 127 caps – placing him joint 14th all-time in international rugby.
- Owen Farrell holds the record for most points scored for England, with 1,237 points – placing him second all-time in international rugby.
- Rory Underwood holds the record for most tries scored for England, with 49 tries – placing him sixth all-time in international rugby.

==== Summary ====
As of 21 November 2026

Players active at international level as of July 2026 are listed in bold italics.

Most Caps
Rank	Player	Caps
1.	Ben Youngs	127
2.	Dan Cole	118
3.	**Jamie George**	115
4.	Jason Leonard	114
5.	Owen Farrell	112
6.	**George Ford**	109
7.	**Maro Itoje**	105
7.	Courtney Lawes	105
9.	Danny Care	101
10.	Dylan Hartley	97

Most Points
Rank	Player	Points
1.	**Owen Farrell**	1,237
2.	Jonny Wilkinson	1,179
3.	**George Ford**	505
4.	Paul Grayson	400
5.	Rob Andrew	396
6.	**Marcus Smith**	343
7.	Toby Flood	301
8.	Jonathan Webb	296
9.	Charlie Hodgson	269
10.	Dusty Hare	240

Most Tries
Rank	Player	Tries
1.	Rory Underwood	49
2.	Jonny May	36
3.	Ben Cohen	31
3.	Will Greenwood	31
5.	Jeremy Guscott	30
6.	Jason Robinson	28
7.	Dan Luger	24
8.	Anthony Watson	23
9.	Josh Lewsey	22
10.	Five players tied	20

== Coaches ==
=== Current coaching staff ===
The following table outlines the current England senior coaching team, as of the 2026 Six Nations Championship.

Nationality	Name	Role	Ref
England	Steve Borthwick	Head Coach	
England	Richard Wigglesworth	Senior Assistant / Defence Coach	
England	Lee Blackett	Attack Coach	
England	Joe El-Abd	Forwards Coach	
England	Tom Harrison	Scrum Coach	
Scotland	Byron McGuigan	Contact Area Coach	
England	Kevin Sinfield	Skills & Kicking Coach	
Ireland	Phil Morrow	Head of Team Performance	
Ireland	Dan Tobin	Strength & Conditioning Coach	
England	Richard Hill	Team Manager	

=== History of head coaches ===
The following is a list of all England head coaches. The first appointed coach was Don White in 1969. The most recent former coach was Eddie Jones. Jones took over from Stuart Lancaster a week after the latter's resignation, and he became the first foreigner to coach the English national side. Jones' winning percentage of 73% is the highest of any England coach.

Updated to: 21 November 2026

Name	Tenure	Tests	Won	Drew	Lost	Win percentage
(England) Don White	20 December 1969 – 17 April 1971	11	3	1	7	27.3
(England) John Elders	18 October 1971 – 16 March 1974	16	6	1	9	37.5
(England) John Burgess	18 January 1975 – 31 May 1975	6	1	0	5	16.7
(England) Peter Colston	3 January 1976 – 17 March 1979	18	6	1	11	33.3
(England) Mike Davis	24 November 1979 – 6 March 1982	16	10	2	4	62.5
(England) Dick Greenwood	15 January 1983 – 20 April 1985	17	4	2	11	23.5
(England) Martin Green	1 June 1985 – 8 June 1987	14	5	0	9	35.7
(England) Geoff Cooke	16 January 1988 – 19 March 1994	50	36	1	13	72.0
(England) Jack Rowell	4 June 1994 – 31 August 1997	29	21	0	8	72.4
(England) Sir Clive Woodward	15 November 1997 – 2 September 2004	83	59	2	22	71.1
(England) Andy Robinson	15 October 2004 – 29 November 2006	22	9	0	13	40.9
(England) Brian Ashton	20 December 2006 – 1 June 2008	22	12	0	10	54.5
(England) Rob Andrew^{[a]}	1 June 2008 – 30 June 2008	2	0	0	2	0.0
(England) Martin Johnson	1 July 2008 – 16 November 2011	38	21	1	16	55.3
(England) Stuart Lancaster	8 December 2011 – 11 November 2015	46	28	1	17	60.9
(Australia) Eddie Jones	20 November 2015 – 6 December 2022	81	59	2	20	72.8
(England) Steve Borthwick	19 December 2022 – present	51	31	0	20	60.8

^{a} Rob Andrew coached the team for the 2008 summer tests in New Zealand in Martin Johnson's absence.

Note 1: Richard Cockerill served briefly as interim head coach in December 2022, between the dismissal of Eddie Jones and appointment of Steve Borthwick. No test matches were played during his tenure.

Note 2: Between September 2015 and March 2017, England won 18 test matches in a row – equalling the record for a top tier nation – 17 of which occurred under Eddie Jones.

==== World Rugby Coach of the Year ====
The following former England head coaches have been nominated for and won the World Rugby Coach of the Year award since its inception in 2001:

Year	Nationality	Nominee	Winner
2003	England	Sir Clive Woodward	**Sir Clive Woodward**
2016	Australia	Eddie Jones	—
2017	Australia	Eddie Jones (2)	**Eddie Jones**
2019	Australia	Eddie Jones (3)	—

=== Former assistant coaches ===
The following names represent a list of previous assistant coaches for the England men's senior squad:

Former coaches appointed to the British & Irish Lions while part of the England coaching staff are listed in bold italics.

- (England) **Dave Alred**
- (England) Simon Amor
- (England) Jon Callard
- (England) Mike Catt
- (England) Jon Clarke
- (England) Richard Cockerill
- (England) Alex Codling
- (Australia) Glen Ella
- (New Zealand) Nick Evans
- (England) **Andy Farrell**
- (England) **Mike Ford**
- (England) Martin Gleeson
- (England) Joe Gray
- (England) Paul Gustard
- (South Africa) Neal Hatley
- (Australia) Brett Hodgson
- (Ireland) Felix Jones
- (England) Phil Keith-Roach
- (England) Danny Kerry
- (England) George Kruis
- (England) **Phil Larder**
- (Wales) Joe Lewis
- (England) Joe Lydon
- (New Zealand) John Mitchell
- (England) **Phil Pask**
- (England) Ian Peel
- (England) Ben Pollard
- (Scotland) Matt Proudfoot
- (England) **Dave Reddin**
- (England) Tony Roques
- (England) **Graham Rowntree**
- (Australia) Jason Ryles
- (Australia) Anthony Seibold
- (Ireland) Brian Smith
- (New Zealand) Andrew Strawbridge
- (England) **Paul Stridgeon**
- (England) Tom Tombleson
- (England) Sam Vesty
- (Wales) Aled Walters
- (England) John Wells
- (England) Jonny Wilkinson
- (Australia) Scott Wisemantel

=== Club versus country ===
Although the England team is governed by the Rugby Football Union (RFU), players have been contracted to their clubs since the advent of professionalism in late 1995. Since then, players have often been caught in a "power struggle" between their clubs and the RFU; this is commonly referred to as a "club versus country" conflict. The first major dispute between England's top clubs (who play in the English Premiership) and the RFU occurred in 1998, when some of the clubs refused to release players to tour Australia, New Zealand and South Africa. The tour became known as the "Tour from hell" after an England squad of second-string players were defeated in all four Tests, including a 76–0 defeat by Australia. The clubs also withdrew from the 1998–99 Heineken Cup.

In 2001, the top clubs and the RFU formed "England Rugby" to help govern the club and international game. The parties agreed to restrict the number of matches at club and international level that elite players (a group of 50 or 60 players selected by the RFU) could play in order to reduce player burnout and injuries. In return for releasing players from club commitments, the clubs were to receive compensation from the RFU. This agreement was considered central to the England victory in the 2003 World Cup. Clive Woodward, England coach from November 1997, resigned in 2004 because he was unable to get the access to the players that he wanted: "I wanted more from the union – more training days with the players, more influence over the way they were treated – and ended up with less." Andy Robinson, Woodward's successor, blamed the lack of control over players for his team's unsuccessful record. Brian Ashton, who took over from Robinson, intentionally named his playing squad for Six Nations matches in 2007 early in the hope that their clubs would not play them in the weekend prior to a Test. The RFU and the Premiership clubs are negotiating a similar deal to the one in 2001 that will enable international players to be released into the England squad prior to international matches.

=== Training ===
Pennyhill Park Hotel in Bagshot, Surrey, is the chosen training base for the team in the 2015 Rugby World Cup. Loughborough University, Bisham Abbey and the University of Bath grounds served as training bases prior to this agreement. Martin Johnson noted the hotel's facilities and its proximity to Twickenham and Heathrow as deciding factors in this decision. The team had their own pitchside gym and fitness rooms constructed on the hotel premises at the start of the long-term arrangement. Since its completion in 2010 the team also regularly use Surrey Sports Park at the University of Surrey in nearby Guildford for much of their training.

== Media coverage ==
England's summer internationals are televised live on ITV, while their autumn internationals are televised live by TNT Sports. Highlights of the autumn tests are currently shown on ITV. As of 2024, all Six Nations games are broadcast free-to-air on the BBC and ITV.

== See also ==
- England A
- England Sevens
- England Under 20s
- England Under 18s
- England Women
- England Women Sevens
- English rugby union system
- Rugby union in England

== Bibliography ==
- Bowker, Barry (1978). England Rugby. Cassell. ISBN 978-0-304-30214-7.
- Collins, Tony (2009). A Social History of English Rugby Union. Routledge. ISBN 978-0-415-47660-7.
- Farmer, Stuart (2006). The Official England Rugby Miscellany. Vision Sports Publishing. ISBN 978-1-905326-12-9.
- Morgan, Michael (2002). "Optimizing the structure of elite competitions in professional sport – lessons from Rugby Union". Managing Leisure. 7: 41–60. doi:10.1080/13606710110117023. S2CID 153521834.
- Palenski, Ron (2003). Century in Black – 100 Years of All Black Test Rugby. Hodder Moa Beckett Publishers. ISBN 978-1-86958-937-0.
- Tuck, Jason (2003). "The Men in White: Reflections on Rugby Union, the Media and Englishness". International Review for the Sociology of Sport. 38 (2): 177–199. doi:10.1177/1012690203038002003. S2CID 143294820.

Preceded by Brazil men's football team	Laureus World Team of the Year; 2004	Succeeded by Greece men's football team
