= 2020–21 Premiership Rugby =

Rugby union competition in England

2020–21 Gallagher Premiership
- Countries: England
- Date: 20 November 2020 – 26 June 2021
- Champions: Harlequins (2nd title)
- Runners-up: Exeter Chiefs
- Relegated: No relegation
- Matches played: 125
- Attendance: 16,866 (average 135 per match)
- Highest attendance: 7,000; Wasps vs Leicester Tigers; 12 June 2021
- Tries scored: 786 (average 6.3 per match)
- Top point scorer: Marcus Smith (Harlequins) (286 points)
- Top try scorer: Sam Simmonds (Exeter) (21 tries)

Official website
- www.premiershiprugby.com

The 2020–21 Gallagher Premiership was the 34th season of the top flight English domestic rugby union competition and the third one to be sponsored by Gallagher. The reigning champions entering the season were Exeter Chiefs, who had claimed their second title after defeating Wasps in the 2020 final. Newcastle Falcons had been promoted as champions from the 2019–20 RFU Championship at the first attempt.

The competition was broadcast by BT Sport for the eighth successive season and with five games also simulcast free-to-air on Channel 5. Highlights of each weekend's games were shown on Channel 5 for the final time, with extended highlights on BT Sport.

== Summary ==
Harlequins won their second title after defeating Exeter Chiefs in the final at Twickenham after having finished fourth in the regular season table. No team was relegated this season after a moratorium was agreed.

Due to changes to the global rugby calendar implemented this year and the COVID-19 pandemic prolonging the 2019–20 Premiership Rugby season, this edition featured a later start and later finish and would take place over a reduced timeframe of 32 weeks.

The season also featured a two-week break in January due to the suspension of both of the European Professional Club Rugby competitions.

== Rule changes ==
New regulations were introduced this season for games cancelled as a result of the pandemic or otherwise. A brief outline of the new regulations are:

- All fixtures will be treated equally.
- No round 1 - 22 fixtures will be postponed unless within the same weekend.

When cancellation is as a result of COVID-19 points will be awarded as follows.

- 2 points awarded to the team responsible for cancellation.
- 4 points will be awarded to the team who wasn't responsible.
- The match result will be deemed to be 0–0

There are also changes to the regulations allowing the Testing Oversight Group to cancel matches.

Regulations for the semi-finals and final will be published later in the year.

This season also includes a moratorium on relegation due to the effects of the pandemic.

This season is the last under the current regulations before changes are made next season and again before 2024–25.

== Teams ==
Twelve teams compete in the league – the top eleven teams from the previous season and Newcastle Falcons who were promoted from the 2019–20 RFU Championship after a top flight absence of one year. They replaced Saracens who were relegated after twenty five years in the top flight following two large points deductions during the season.

=== Stadiums and locations ===
2020–21 Gallagher Premiership Teams

| Club | Director of Rugby/Head Coach | Captain | Kit supplier | Stadium | Capacity | City/Area |
|---|---|---|---|---|---|---|
| Bath | (England) Stuart Hooper | (England) Charlie Ewels | Macron | The Recreation Ground | 14,509 | Bath |
| Bristol Bears | (Samoa) Pat Lam | (New Zealand) Steve Luatua | Umbro | Ashton Gate | 27,000 | Bristol |
| Exeter Chiefs | (England) Rob Baxter | (England) Jack Yeandle (England) Joe Simmonds | Samurai Sportswear | Sandy Park | 13,593 | Exeter |
| Gloucester | (England) George Skivington | (England) Lewis Ludlow | Oxen Sports | Kingsholm | 16,115 | Gloucester |
| Harlequins | (Australia) Billy Millard (Note: General Manager (Rugby)) | (South Africa) Stephan Lewies | Adidas | Twickenham Stoop | 14,800 | Twickenham, Greater London |
| Leicester Tigers | (England) Steve Borthwick | (England) Tom Youngs | Samurai Sportswear | Welford Road | 25,849 | Leicester |
| London Irish | (Ireland) Declan Kidney | (Scotland) Blair Cowan (Ireland) Paddy Jackson (Australia) Nick Phipps (England) Matt Rogerson | BLK | Brentford Community Stadium | 17,250 | Brentford, Greater London |
| Newcastle Falcons | (England) Dean Richards | (England) Mark Wilson | Macron | Kingston Park | 10,200 | Newcastle upon Tyne |
| Northampton Saints | (New Zealand) Chris Boyd | (England) Lewis Ludlam (England) Alex Waller | Macron | Franklin's Gardens | 15,200 | Northampton |
| Sale Sharks | (England) Alex Sanderson (Note: Sanderson was appointed Director of Rugby in January 2021 following the departure of former Director of Rugby Steve Diamond in December 2020.) | (South Africa) Jono Ross | Samurai Sportswear | AJ Bell Stadium | 12,000 | Salford, Greater Manchester |
| Wasps | (England) Lee Blackett | (England) Dan Robson (Wales) Thomas Young | Under Armour | Ricoh Arena | 32,609 | Coventry |
| Worcester Warriors | (South Africa) Alan Solomons | (England) Ted Hill | O'Neills | Sixways Stadium | 11,499 | Worcester |

== Table ==
2020–21 Premiership Rugby Table
| Pos | Team | Pld | W | D | L | PF | PA | PD | TF | TA | TB | LB | Pts | Qualification |
|---|---|---|---|---|---|---|---|---|---|---|---|---|---|---|
| 1 | Bristol Bears (SF) | 22 | 17 | 1 | 4 | 561 | 379 | +182 | 75 | 42 | 13 | 2 | 85 | Play-off place, Berth in the 2021–22 European Rugby Champions Cup |
| 2 | Exeter Chiefs (RU) | 22 | 17 | 0 | 5 | 624 | 356 | +268 | 93 | 40 | 12 | 2 | 82 | Play-off place, Berth in the 2021–22 European Rugby Champions Cup |
| 3 | Sale Sharks (SF) | 22 | 16 | 0 | 6 | 537 | 401 | +136 | 64 | 42 | 5 | 5 | 74 | Play-off place, Berth in the 2021–22 European Rugby Champions Cup |
| 4 | Harlequins (C) | 22 | 13 | 1 | 8 | 703 | 564 | +139 | 89 | 77 | 11 | 4 | 71 (Note: Cancelled Fixture: Newcastle Falcons 4pts; Leicester Tigers 2pts; Cancelled Fixture: Bath 4pts; London Irish 2pts; Cancelled Fixture: Worcester Warriors 4pts; Harlequins 2pts; Cancelled Fixture: Northampton Saints 4pts; London Irish 2pts; Cancelled Fixture: Leicester Tigers 4pts; Northampton Saints 2pts; Cancelled Fixture: Northampton Saints 4pts; Newcastle Falcons 2pts; Cancelled Fixture: Worcester Warriors 4pts; Newcastle Falcons 2pts; Cancelled Fixture: Bath 4pts; Gloucester 2pts; Cancelled Fixture: Worcester Warriors 4pts; Gloucester 2pts; Cancelled Fixture: Bristol Bears 4pts; London Irish 2pts) | Play-off place, Berth in the 2021–22 European Rugby Champions Cup |
| 5 | Northampton Saints | 22 | 11 | 0 | 11 | 469 | 457 | +12 | 59 | 57 | 6 | 5 | 57 | Berth in the 2021–22 European Rugby Champions Cup |
| 6 | Leicester Tigers | 22 | 11 | 0 | 11 | 478 | 492 | −14 | 51 | 62 | 5 | 3 | 54 | Berth in the 2021–22 European Rugby Champions Cup |
| 7 | Bath | 22 | 10 | 0 | 12 | 494 | 604 | −110 | 61 | 82 | 8 | 4 | 52 | Berth in the 2021–22 European Rugby Champions Cup |
| 8 | Wasps | 22 | 9 | 0 | 13 | 539 | 624 | −85 | 66 | 72 | 7 | 7 | 50 | Berth in the 2021–22 European Rugby Champions Cup |
| 9 | London Irish | 22 | 6 | 2 | 14 | 439 | 531 | −92 | 53 | 68 | 9 | 5 | 48 | 2021–22 European Rugby Challenge Cup |
| 10 | Newcastle Falcons | 22 | 9 | 0 | 13 | 385 | 512 | −127 | 50 | 70 | 3 | 2 | 45 | 2021–22 European Rugby Challenge Cup |
| 11 | Gloucester | 22 | 7 | 0 | 15 | 450 | 518 | −68 | 56 | 66 | 6 | 7 | 45 | 2021–22 European Rugby Challenge Cup |
| 12 | Worcester Warriors | 22 | 4 | 0 | 18 | 326 | 567 | −241 | 39 | 78 | 3 | 8 | 27 | 2021–22 European Rugby Challenge Cup |

Source: Premiership Rugby
Rules for classification: Games cancelled due to COVID-19 will recorded as 0–0 but a win and 4 points will be awarded if a club was able to field a team and a loss and 2 points if they were not.
Tiebreakers for teams tied on points: 1) Number of matches won; 2) Difference between points for and against; 3) Total number of points for; 4) Aggregate number of points scored in matches between tied teams; 5) Number of matches won excluding the first match, then the second and so on until the tie is settled
(C) Champions; (RU) Runners-up; (SF) Losing semi-finalists

== Fixtures ==
Fixtures for the season were announced by Premiership Rugby on 29 September 2020 - this was delayed from July due to the previous season being affected by the COVID-19 pandemic lockdown.

The London Double Header no longer features after being discontinued in 2018.

=== League Season ===
The league season began on 20 November 2020.

==== Round 1 ====
20 November 2020
19:45

| Harlequins | 3 – 33 | Exeter Chiefs (1 BP) |
| Pen: Smith (1/2) 14' | Report | Try: S. Simmonds (3) 22' c, 71' c, 75' c Ewers 45' m Townsend 79' c Con: J. Simmonds (4/5) 23', 72', 76', 80' |

Twickenham Stoop
Attendance: 0 (Note: Match played behind closed doors due to the COVID-19 pandemic.)
Referee: Christophe Ridley

20 November 2020
20:00

| (1 BP) Sale Sharks | 32 – 23 | Northampton Saints |
| Try: van der Merwe 6' c D. du Preez 19' c Hammersley 45' m MacGinty 61' c Con: MacGinty (3/4) 7', 20', 61'; Pen: MacGinty (1/2) 4'; R. du Preez (1/1) 76' | Report | Try: Collins 23' c Francis 66' c Con: Grayson (2/2) 24', 66'; Pen: Grayson (2/3) 42', 60'; Mallinder (1/1) 74' |

AJ Bell Stadium
Attendance: 0
Referee: Ian Tempest

21 November 2020
12:30

| (1 BP) Bath | 12 – 19 | Newcastle Falcons |
| Try: Cokanasiga 9' c Matavesi 45' m Con: Priestland (1/2) 10' | Report | Try: Graham (2) 22' m, 38' c Stevenson 51' c Con: Connon (2/3) 39', 52' |

Recreation Ground
Attendance: 0
Referee: Craig Maxwell-Keys

21 November 2020
15:00

| (1 BP) Leicester Tigers | 38 – 15 | Gloucester |
| Try: van Wyk 8' c T. Youngs 12' m Wigglesworth 24' c Clare 75' c Con: Henry (2/3) 35', 54', 66'; Díaz Bonilla (1/1) 76'; Pen: Henry (2/3) 9', 25'; Díaz Bonilla (1/1) 80+1' | Report | Try: Hanson 37' m Simpson 48' c Con: Twelvetrees (1/2) 48'; Pen: Twelvetrees (1/2) 22' |

Welford Road
Attendance: 0
Referee: Jack Makepeace

21 November 2020
15:00

| Worcester Warriors | 11 – 10 | London Irish (1 BP) |
| Try: Howe 65' m Pen: Searle (2/3) 5', 45' | Report | Try: Phipps 61' c Con: Jackson (1/1) 62'; Pen: Jackson (1/2) 12' |

Sixways
Attendance: 0
Referee: Adam Leal

22 November 2020
13:00

| Wasps | 23 – 20 | Bristol Bears (1 BP) |
| Try: J. Willis 70' c T. Willis 78' c Con: Gopperth (2/2) 71', 79'; Pen: Gopperth (3/4) 19', 32', 46' | Report | Try: Randall 51' c S. Piutau 74' c Con: Bedlow (2/2) 52', 75'; Pen: Bedlow (2/3) 8', 67' |

Ricoh Arena
Attendance: 0
Referee: Tom Foley

==== Round 2 ====
27 November 2020
19:45

| Newcastle Falcons | 15 – 13 | Sale Sharks (1 BP) |
| Try: Robinson 35' c Flood 80+1' m Con: Connon (1/1) 36'; Pen: Connon (1/2) 6' | Report | Try: Wiese 72' c Con: MacGinty (1/1) 73'; Pen: MacGinty (2/2) 44', 52' |

Kingston Park
Attendance: 0
Referee: Wayne Barnes

28 November 2020
14:00

| (1 BP) Northampton Saints | 29 – 49 | Harlequins (1 BP) |
| Try: Ludlam (2) 11' c, 66' m Isiekwe 40' c Hutchinson 60' c Con: J. Grayson (2/2) 11', 40'; Mallinder (1/2) 61'; Pen: J. Grayson (1/1) 24' | Report | Try: Care 7' c Earle 22' c Brown 49' c Dombrandt 52' c Steele 73' m Smith 80' c Con: Smith (5/6) 8', 23', 50', 53', 80+1'; Pen: Smith (3/3) 19', 28', 33' |

Franklin's Gardens
Attendance: 0
Referee: Tom Foley

28 November 2020
15:00

| (1 BP) Bristol Bears | 30 – 13 | Worcester Warriors |
| Try: O'Conor 25' m Byrne 51' m S. Piutau 69' c Penalty try 77'; Con: Lloyd (1/3) 70'; Pen: Lloyd (2/2) 4', 9' | Report | Try: Howe 32' m Mama 45' m Pen: Searle (1/3) 24' |

Ashton Gate
Attendance: 0
Referee: Ian Tempest

28 November 2020
15:00

| (1 BP) Gloucester | 40 – 24 | Wasps (1 BP) |
| Try: Singleton 39' c Garvey 48' m Simpson 62' c Woodward 67' m Twelvetrees 69' c Con: Twelvetrees (3/5) 40+1', 64', 70'; Pen: Twelvetrees (3/5) 10', 37', 43' | Report | Try: Le Bourgeois 24' m Barbeary 45' c Odogwu 80' c, 80+1' m Con: Gopperth (2/4) 46', 80' |

Kingsholm
Attendance: 0
Referee: Hamish Smales

28 November 2020
17:30

| (1 BP) Exeter Chiefs | 40 – 3 | Bath |
| Try: S. Simmonds (2) 11' c, 30' c O'Flaherty 32' c Penalty try 62'; Hidalgo-Clyne 67' c Whitten 76' m Con: J. Simmonds (3/3) 12', 31', 34'; Walsh (1/2) 68' | Report | Pen: Priestland (1/1) 17' |

Sandy Park
Attendance: 0
Referee: Christophe Ridley

29 November 2020
16:15

| London Irish | 22 – 9 | Leicester Tigers |
| Try: Rona 30' c Con: Jackson (1/1) 31'; Pen: Jackson (5/7) 9', 18', 66', 71', 80+1' | Report | Pen: Henry (1/1) 7'; Díaz Bonilla (2/2) 48', 53' |

Brentford Community Stadium
Attendance: 0
Referee: Karl Dickson

==== Round 3 ====
4 December 2020
19:45

| Bristol Bears | 18 – 17 | Northampton Saints (1BP) |
| Try: Purdy 20' m O'Conor 72' c Con: Bedlow (1/1) 73'; Pen: Eden (1/3) 45'; Bedlow (1/1) 80+1' | Report | Try: Ribbans 9' c Francis 15' c Con: Grayson (2/2) 10', 16'; Pen: Grayson (1/1) 68' |

Ashton Gate
Attendance: 0 (Note: Match played behind closed doors due to local restrictions surrounding the COVID-19 pandemic.)
Referee: Luke Pearce

5 December 2020
15:00

| Leicester Tigers | 13 – 35 | Exeter Chiefs (1BP) |
| Try: Clare 36' c Con: Henry (1/1) 37'; Pen: Henry (2/2) 2', 32' | Report | Try: Yeandle 13' c Kirsten 52' c Whitten 55' c S. Simmonds 71' c Devoto 75' c Con: J. Simmonds (5/5) 14', 53', 57', 73', 76' |

Welford Road
Attendance: 0
Referee: Craig Maxwell-Keys

5 December 2020
15:00

| Wasps | 17 – 27 | Newcastle Falcons |
| Try: Odogwu 21' m West 64' m Douglas 80+1' c Con: Umaga (1/2) 80+1' | Report | Try: Radwan 17' c Fuser 35' c Stevenson 44' c Con: Flood (3/3) 18', 36', 45'; Pen: Flood (2/2) 3', 54' |

Ricoh Arena
Attendance: 0
Referee: Andrew Jackson

5 December 2020
15:00

| Worcester Warriors | 17 – 33 | Bath (1BP) |
| Try: Humphreys 62' c David 75' c Con: Searle (2/2) 62', 75'; Pen: Weir (1/1) 6' | Report | Try: Mercer 21' c Wright 28' c McNally 40+3' c Stooke 53' c Rokoduguni 57' m Con: B. Spencer (4/5) 22', 29', 40+4', 54' |

Sixways
Attendance: 2,000 (Note: Spectators numbers limited to 2,000 due to local restrictions surrounding the COVID-19 pandemic.)
Referee: Tom Foley

6 December 2020
14:30

| London Irish | 13 – 21 | Sale Sharks |
| Try: Rona 40+2' c Con: Jackson (1/1) 40+4'; Pen: Jackson (2/3) 27', 38' | Report | Try: Janse van Rensburg 23' c van der Merwe 43' m Con: MacGinty (1/2) 24'; Pen: MacGinty (3/3) 10', 32', 60' |

Brentford Community Stadium
Attendance: 2,000
Referee: Christophe Ridley

6 December 2020
16:15

| Gloucester | 24 – 34 | Harlequins (1 BP) |
| Try: Slater 26' c Hanson (2) 68' c, 74' c Con: Twelvetrees (1/1) 27'; J. Morris (2/2) 69', 74'; Pen: Twelvetrees (1/1) 16' | Report | Try: Dombrandt (2) 4' c, 63' c J. Chisholm 40+3' c Earle 58' c Con: Smith (4/4) 6', 40+4', 59', 64'; Pen: Smith (1/1) 23'; Drop: Smith (1/2) 71' |

Kingsholm
Attendance: 2,000
Referee: Ian Tempest

==== Round 4 ====
26 December 2020
14:00

| Bath | Cancelled (Note: London Irish have returned a number of positive COVID-19 tests and are therefore unable to field a side.); 0 – 0 (Note: Bath awarded a win.) | London Irish |

Recreation Ground

26 December 2020
14:00

| Harlequins | 19 – 27 | Bristol Bears (1 BP) |
| Try: Smith 80+1' c Con: Smith (1/1) 80+2'; Pen: Smith (4/4) 7', 18', 25', 47' | Report | Try: Thomas 40' m Luatua 45' c Randall 56' m Adeolokun 67' c Con: Sheedy (2/4) 46', 68'; Pen: Sheedy (1/1) 50' |

Twickenham Stoop
Attendance: 0
Referee: Matthew Carley

26 December 2020
14:00

| Newcastle Falcons | Cancelled; 0 – 0 (Note: Due to a number of positive COVID-19 tests on the Tigers' team, they are unable to field a team and therefore forfeit. Newcastle Falcons awarded a win) | Leicester Tigers |

Kingston Park

26 December 2020
15:00

| (1 BP) Exeter Chiefs | 28 – 20 | Gloucester |
| Try: Gray 34' c Devoto 48' c S. Simmonds (2) 54' c, 71' c Con: J. Simmonds (4/4) 35', 49', 55', 72' | Report | Try: Venner (2) 63' c, 75' c Con: Evans (2/2) 63', 75'; Pen: Evans (2/4) 11', 40+3' |

Sandy Park
Attendance: 2,000
Referee: Tom Foley

26 December 2020
16:30

| (1 BP) Northampton Saints | 29 – 10 | Worcester Warriors |
| Try: Penalty try 14'; Mitchell 29' c Biggar 65' c Haywood 78' m Con: Biggar (2/3) 29', 66'; Pen: Biggar (1/2) 3' | Report | Try: Searle 27' c Con: Searle (1/1) 28'; Pen: Searle (1/1) 50' |

Franklin's Gardens
Attendance: 0
Referee: Christophe Ridley

27 December 2020
15:00

| (1 BP) Sale Sharks | 23 – 26 | Wasps |
| Try: Yarde (2) 32' c, 77' c Con: MacGinty (2/2) 33', 78'; Pen: MacGinty (3/3) 15', 46', 62' | Report | Try: Atkinson 43' c Cruse 47' c Con: Sopoaga (2/2) 43', 48'; Pen: Sopoaga (4/4) 12', 59', 66', 72' |

AJ Bell Stadium
Attendance: 0
Referee: Craig Maxwell-Keys

==== Round 5 ====
1 January 2021
15:00

| (1 BP) Bristol Bears | 29 – 17 | Newcastle Falcons |
| Try: Naulago 1' c C. Piutau 18' c Hughes 43' c Kloska 59' m Con: Sheedy (3/4) 2', 19', 43'; Pen: Sheedy (1/1) 80' | Report | Try: Wacokecoke 12' m Wilson 40' m van der Walt 53' c Con: Flood (1/1) 53' |

Ashton Gate
Attendance: 0
Referee: Christophe Ridley

1 January 2021
19:45

| Worcester Warriors | Cancelled; 0 – 0 (Note: Harlequins have several players being forced to self-isolate and are therefore unable to field a side. Worcester Warriors awarded a win.) | Harlequins |

Sixways

2 January 2021
14:00

| (1 BP) Wasps | 34 – 5 | Exeter Chiefs |
| Try: Gaskell (2) 20' m, 50' c Sopoaga 56' m McIntyre (2) 69' c, 80+3' c Con: Sopoaga (3/5) 51', 71', 80+4'; Pen: Sopoaga (1/1) 40' | Report | Try: Capstick 46' m |

Ricoh Arena
Attendance: 0
Referee: Ian Tempest

2 January 2021
16:30

| (1 BP) Gloucester | 19 – 22 | Sale Sharks |
| Try: Balmain 22' m Rees-Zammit 33' m Pen: Evans (3/3) 6', 29', 71' | Report | Try: Beaumont 78' c Con: MacGinty (1/1) 80'; Pen: MacGinty (5/5) 18', 26', 38', 44', 59' |

Kingsholm
Attendance: 0
Referee: Karl Dickson

3 January 2021
14:30

| London Irish | Cancelled; 0 – 0 (Note: Northampton Saints awarded a win) | Northampton Saints |

Brentford Community Stadium

3 January 2021
15:00

| Leicester Tigers | 36 – 31 | Bath (1 BP) |
| Try: Steward 37' c Wells 42' c Henderson 65' c Con: Ford (3/3) 38', 43', 66'; Pen: Ford (5/6) 24', 28', 40+5', 51', 74' | Report | Try: Obano 3' c Spencer 16' c Redpath 77' m Con: Priestland (2/3) 4', 17'; Pen: Priestland (4/4) 40', 48', 55', 63' |

Welford Road
Attendance: 0
Referee: Wayne Barnes

==== Round 6 ====
8 January 2021
19:45

| (1 BP) Bath | 44 – 52 | Wasps (1 BP) |
| Try: Priestland 4' c Underhill 18' c Redpath 57' c Stooke 80+1' m Con: Priestland (3/4) 5', 19', 47; Pen: Priestland (5/5) 7', 14', 27', 31', 37'; Spencer (1/1) 71' | Report | Try: Penalty try 16'; Cruse (2) 22' c, 45' c Shields 40' c Odogwu (2) 50' c, 57' c Bassett 75' c Con: Sopoaga (6/6) 22', 40+1', 46', 51' c, 59' c, 75 ' c Pen: Sopoaga (1/1) 33' |

Recreation Ground
Attendance: 0
Referee: Matthew Carley

8 January 2021
20:00

| Sale Sharks | 20 – 13 | Worcester Warriors (1 BP) |
| Try: de Klerk 22' c Ross 76' c Con: MacGinty (2/2) 24', 77'; Pen: MacGinty (2/3) 20', 37' | Report | Try: Penalty try 79'; Pen: Weir (2/3) 40+1', 57' |

AJ Bell Stadium
Attendance: 0
Referee: Wayne Barnes

9 January 2021
14:00

| Newcastle Falcons | 22 – 10 | Gloucester |
| Try: Radwan 4' m Orlando 14' c McGuigan 80+1' c Con: Flood (1/2) 15'; Connon (1/1) 80+2'; Pen: Connon (1/2) 76' | Report | Try: May 24' c Con: Evans (1/1) 26'; Pen: Evans (1/2) 53' |

Kingston Park
Attendance: 0
Referee: Craig Maxwell-Keys

9 January 2021
16:30

| Exeter Chiefs | 7 – 20 | Bristol Bears |
| Try: Hill 34' c Con: J. Simmonds (1/1) 36' | Report | Try: Randall 15' c Radradra 69' c Con: Sheedy (2/2) 16', 71'; Pen: Sheedy (2/2) 44', 79' |

Sandy Park
Attendance: 0
Referee: Karl Dickson

9 January 2021
16:30

| Northampton Saints | Cancelled; 0 – 0 (Note: Due to a number of positive COVID-19 tests on the Saints' team, they are unable to field a team and therefore forfeit. Leicester Tigers awarded a win.) | Leicester Tigers |

Franklin's Gardens

10 January 2021
15:00

| Harlequins | 27 – 27 | London Irish (1 BP) |
| Try: Smith 18' c, Brown 32' c Steele 63' c Con: Smith (3/3) 20', 32', 64'; Pen: Smith (2/2) 7', 48' | Report | Try: Rona 12' c Matu'u 38' m Tuisue 68' m Hoskins 79' c Con: Jackson (2/4) 13', 80'; Pen: Jackson (1/2) 50' |

Twickenham Stoop
Attendance: 0
Referee: Tom Foley

==== Round 7 ====
29 January 2021
19:45

| (1 BP) Bristol Bears | 48 – 3 | Bath |
| Try: Morahan 5' m Piutau 8' m Uren 27' c Byrne (2) 34' c, 39' c Radradra 42' c Penalty try 53'; Con: Lloyd (4/6) 29', 35', 40', 43'; Pen: Lloyd (1/1) 20' | Report | Pen: Priestland (1/1) 17' |

Ashton Gate
Attendance: 0
Referee: Wayne Barnes

29 January 2021
19:45

| Leicester Tigers | 15 – 25 | Sale Sharks |
| Try: Reffell 22' m Nadolo 75' c Con: McPhillips (1/1) 76'; Pen: Henry (1/1) 8' | Report | Try: S. James 28' c Wiese 43' c Yarde 55' m Con: MacGinty (2/3) 30', 44'; Pen: MacGinty (2/2) 40', 71' |

Welford Road
Attendance: 0
Referee: Ian Tempest

30 January 2021
15:00

| (1 BP) Gloucester | 26 – 31 | Northampton Saints (1 BP) |
| Try: Heinz 49' c Alemanno 79' c Con: Twelvetrees (2/2) 50', 80'; Pen: Twelvetrees (4/5) 11', 17', 22', 34' | Report | Try: Naiyaravoro 26' m Hutchinson 52' c Adendorff (2) 56' m, 60' m Con: Biggar (1/4) 53'; Pen: Biggar (3/3) 7', 31', 67' |

Kingsholm
Attendance: 0
Referee: Karl Dickson

30 January 2021
15:00

| (1 BP) Worcester Warriors | 17 – 21 | Exeter Chiefs |
| Try: Morris 28' c Weir 50' c Con: Weir (2/2) 29', 52'; Pen: Weir (1/2) 37' | Report | Try: Gray 9' c Whitten 14' c Devoto 43' c Con: J. Simmonds (3/3) 10', 15', 44' |

Sixways
Attendance: 0
Referee: Tom Foley

31 January 2021
14:30

| (1 BP) London Irish | 31 – 22 | Newcastle Falcons |
| Try: Creevy 19' c Stokes 29' c Rona 52' c Matu'u 78' c Con: Jackson (4/4) 20', 30' 53' 79'; Pen: Jackson (1/1) 46' | Report | Try: Stevenson 36' m Stuart 71' c Graham 75' c Con: Hodgson (2/3) 72', 76'; Pen: Hodgson (1/2) 40+1' |

Brentford Community Stadium
Attendance: 0
Referee: Matthew Carley

31 January 2021
15:00

| Wasps | 17 – 49 | Harlequins (1 BP) |
| Try: Kibirige 59' c T. Willis 70' c Con: Gopperth (2/2) 60', 71'; Pen: Sopoaga (1/1) 40+1' | Report | Try: Evans 6' c Care 15' c Dombrandt 44' m Lynagh 66' c Lang 77' c Penalty try 80+3'; Con: Smith (4/5) 7', 15', 67', 79'; Pen: Smith (3/3) 11', 30', 64' |

Ricoh Arena
Attendance: 0
Referee: Luke Pearce

==== Round 8 ====
5 February 2021
19:45

| (1 BP) Bristol Bears | 13 – 20 | Sale Sharks |
| Try: Byrne 17' c Con: Lloyd (1/1) 18'; Pen: Lloyd (2/2) 64', 73' | Report | Try: L. James 76' m Pen: MacGinty (5/5) 21', 27', 33', 58' 80+1' |

Ashton Gate
Attendance: 0
Referee: Luke Pearce

6 February 2021
13:00

| (1 BP) Wasps | 17 – 22 | Northampton Saints |
| Try: Miller 43' c Taylor 68' c Con: Gopperth (1/1) 44'; Umaga (1/1) 69'; Pen: Umaga (1/1) 62' | Report | Try: Adendorff 22' m Matavesi 28' c Naiyaravoro 32' c Con: Grayson (2/3) 29', 34'; Pen: Grayson (1/1) 13' |

Ricoh Arena
Attendance: 0
Referee: Adam Leal

6 February 2021
14:15

| Bath | 15 – 28 | Harlequins |
| Try: Dunn 44' c de Glanville 76' m Con: Priestland (1/1) 45'; Pen: Priestland (1/1) 5' | Report | Try: Dombrandt 8' c Morris 28' m Care 52' c Con: Smith (1/1) 9'; Lang 53'; Pen: Smith (2/2) 7', 18'; Lang (1/1) 23' |

Recreation Ground
Attendance: 0
Referee: Craig Maxwell-Keys

6 February 2021
15:00

| (1 BP) Leicester Tigers | 41 – 24 | Worcester Warriors |
| Try: Montoya (2) 23' c, 47' c Wiese (2) 54' c, 72' c T. Youngs 66' c Con: Henry (5/5) 24', 48', 54', 67', 73'; Pen: Henry (2/2) 9', 36' | Report | Try: Palframan 57' c Morris 69' c Humphreys 77' c Con: Shillcock (3/3) 58', 69', 77'; Pen: Weir (1/1) 18' |

Welford Road
Attendance: 0
Referee: Andrew Jackson

6 February 2021
15:00

| (1 BP) London Irish | 32 – 26 | Gloucester (2 BP) |
| Try: Cowan (2) 1' c, 43' m Hassell-Collins 7' m Creevy 51' m Parton 72' c Con: Jackson (2/5) 2', 73'; Pen: Jackson (1/1) 76' | Report | Try: Trinder 3' c Craig (2) 12' c, 79' m Atkinson 56' c Con: Twelveltrees (3/4) 4', 13', 57' |

Brentford Community Stadium
Attendance: 0
Referee: Ian Tempest

7 February 2021
13:00

| (1 BP) Newcastle Falcons | 9 – 15 | Exeter Chiefs |
| Pen: Hodgson (3/3) 6', 20', 60' | Report | Try: S. Simmonds 16' c Cuthbert 52' m Con: J. Simmonds (1/2) 17'; Pen: J. Simmonds (1/1) 31' |

Kingston Park
Attendance: 0
Referee: Anthony Woodthorpe

==== Round 9 ====
12 February 2021
19:45

| (1 BP) Gloucester | 17 – 18 | Bristol Bears |
| Try: Carreras (2) 12' c, 26' m Thorley 52' m Con: Twelvetrees (1/3) 13' | Report | Try: Byrne 4' m Heenan 33' c Con: Lloyd (1/2) 34'; Pen: Lloyd (2/2) 57', 76' |

Kingsholm
Attendance: 0
Referee: Tom Foley

12 February 2021
20:00

| (1 BP) Sale Sharks | 22 – 27 | Bath |
| Try: Ross 25' c D. du Preez 44' m Neild 80+3' c Con: R. du Preez (1/2) 27'; MacGinty (1/1) 80+4'; Pen: R. du Preez (1/1) 20' | Report | Try: de Glanville 2' c Dunn 31' c Bayliss 40+1' c Con: Priestland (3/3) 3', 32', 40+2'; Pen: Priestland (2/2) 22', 57' |

AJ Bell Stadium
Attendance: 0
Referee: Christophe Ridley

13 February 2021
16:00

| (1 BP) Harlequins | 37 – 24 | Leicester Tigers |
| Try: Brown 10' c Smith 31' c Esterhuizen 40+2' c Lynagh 42' c Con: Smith (4/4) 11', 32', 40+2', 43'; Pen: Smith (3/4) 17', 27', 38' | Report | Try: Brink 5' c van Poortvliet 33' c Martin 47' c Con: Henry (3/3) 5', 34', 47'; Pen: Henry (1/1) 39' |

Twickenham Stoop
Attendance: 0
Referee: Anthony Woodthorpe

13 February 2021
16:15

| (1 BP) Exeter Chiefs | 26 – 3 | London Irish |
| Try: S. Simmonds (2) 4' c, 72' m Ewers 15' c Cuthbert 43' c Con: J. Simmonds (2/2) 4', 17'; H. Skinner (1/2) 43' | Report | Pen: Jackson (1/1) 29' |

Sandy Park
Attendance: 0
Referee: Jack Makepeace

13 February 2021
16:30

| Northampton Saints | Cancelled; 0 – 0 (Note: Due to Newcastle returning a number of positive COVID-19 tests, they are unable to field a team and therefore the match has been cancelled. Northampton Saints awarded a win.) | Newcastle Falcons |

Franklin's Gardens

14 February 2021
13:00

| (1 BP) Worcester Warriors | 13 – 17 | Wasps |
| Try: David 60' c Con: Shillcock (1/1) 61'; Pen: Shillcock (2/3) 12', 68' | Report | Try: Gaskell 15' c T. Willis 36' c Con: Gopperth (2/2) 16', 38'; Pen: Atkinson (1/1) 59' |

Sixways
Attendance: 0
Referee: Ian Tempest

==== Round 10 ====
19 February 2021
19:45

| Bath | 16 – 14 | Gloucester (1 BP) |
| Try: Faletau 40' c Con: Priestland (1/1) 40+1'; Pen: Priestland (3/3) 51', 63', 79' | Report | Try: Ludlow 75' m Pen: Twelvetrees (3/3) 16', 25', 71' |

Recreation Ground
Attendance: 0
Referee: Wayne Barnes

20 February 2021
13:00

| Harlequins | 24 – 12 | Sale Sharks |
| Try: Marchant (2) 25' c, 28' c Dombrandt 37' c Con: Smith (3/3) 27', 30', 39'; Pen: Smith (1/1) 54' | Report | Try: Langdon 62' c R. du Preez 69' m Con: R. du Preez (1/2) 62' |

Twickenham Stoop
Attendance: 0
Referee: Ian Tempest

20 February 2021
15:00

| Leicester Tigers | 27 – 8 | Wasps |
| Try: Wiese 4' m Montoya 48' m Reffell 77' m Pen: Henry (5/7) 15', 23', 34', 67' | Report | Try: Cruse 62' m Pen: Gopperth (1/1) 18' |

Welford Road
Attendance: 0
Referee: Craig Maxwell-Keys

20 February 2021
15:00

| (1 BP) Exeter Chiefs | 12 – 13 | Northampton Saints |
| Try: Yeandle 30' c S. Skinner 79' m Con: H. Skinner (1/1) 31' | Report | Try: Adendorff 11' c Con: Francis (1/1) 12'; Pen: Francis (2/3) 70', 74' |

Sandy Park
Attendance: 0
Referee: Christophe Ridley

20 February 2021
15:00

| Worcester Warriors | Cancelled; 0 – 0 (Note: Newcastle Falcons returned a number of positive COVID-19 tests and are therefore unable to field a team. Worcester Warriors awarded a win.) | Newcastle Falcons |

Sixways

21 February 2021
15:00

| (1 BP) London Irish | 34 – 34 | Bristol Bears (1 BP) |
| Try: Mafi 39' c Brophy-Clews 64' c Phipps 69' c Parton 77' c Con: Jackson (4/4) 40', 64', 69', 78'; Pen: Jackson (2/2) 4', 26' | Report | Try: O'Conor 7' c Naulago (3) 10' c, 36' c Vui 33' c Con: Sheedy (4/4) 8', 11', 34', 37'; Pen: Sheedy (2/2) 14', 58' |

Brentford Community Stadium
Attendance: 0
Referee: Karl Dickson

==== Round 11 ====
26 February 2021
19:45

| Sale Sharks | 25 – 20 | Exeter Chiefs (1 BP) |
| Try: McGuigan 4' m Rodd 39' c Langdon 68' c Con: MacGinty (2/3) 40+1', 70'; Pen: MacGinty (2/2) 16', 76' | Report | Try: Cordero 8' c Lonsdale 24' m S. Simmonds 50' m Con: J. Simmonds (1/3) 9'; Pen: J. Simmonds (1/1) 30' |

AJ Bell Stadium
Attendance: 0
Referee: Karl Dickson

27 February 2021
13:00

| Bristol Bears | 17 – 3 | Leicester Tigers |
| Try: Capon 33' c O'Conor 38' c Con: Lloyd (2/2) 34', 39'; Pen: Lloyd (1/1) 49' | Report | Pen: Díaz Bonilla (1/3) 29' |

Ashton Gate
Attendance: 0
Referee: Christophe Ridley

27 February 2021
15:00

| Newcastle Falcons | 25 – 22 | Harlequins (1 BP) |
| Try: Chick 13' c Mulipola 28' c Radwan 48' m Con: Connon (2/3) 15', 29'; Pen: Connon (2/3) 69', 80' | Report | Try: Lewies 30' c Green (2) 56' c, 63' m Con: Smith (2/3) 31', 57'; Pen: Smith (1/1) 75' |

Kingston Park
Attendance: 0
Referee: Jack Makepeace

27 February 2021
15:00

| (1 BP) Wasps | 10 – 16 | London Irish |
| Try: T. Willis 36' c Con: Umaga (1/1) 37'; Pen: Umaga (1/1) 10' | Report | Try: Hassell-Collins 49' c Con: Jackson (1/1) 50'; Pen: Jackson (3/3) 2', 19', 76' |

Ricoh Arena
Attendance: 0
Referee: Hamish Smales

27 February 2021
15:15

| Gloucester | 22 – 14 | Worcester Warriors |
| Try: Twelvetrees 35' m Alemanno 52' c Seabrook 54'; Con: Twelvetrees (2/3) 53', 54'; Pen: Barton (1/1) 74' | Report | Try: David 1' c Penalty try 43'; Con: Shillcock (1/1) 2' |

Kingsholm
Attendance: 0
Referee: Luke Pearce

28 February 2021
13:00

| (1 BP) Northampton Saints | 22 – 23 | Bath |
| Try: James (2) 14' m, 20' c Freeman 27' c Con: Francis (2/3) 21', 29'; Pen: Francis (1/1) 65' | Report | Try: Mercer (2) 40+1' c, 68' c Con: Priestland (2/2) 40+3', 69'; Pen: Priestland (3/3) 25', 57', 62' |

Franklin's Gardens
Attendance: 0
Referee: Ian Tempest

==== Round 12 ====
5 March 2021
19:45

| Leicester Tigers | 33 – 32 | London Irish (2 BP) |
| Try: van Wyk 25' c Chessum 43' c Murimurivalu 68' c Con: Henry (2/2) 26', 44'; McPhillips (1/1) 68'; Pen: Henry (3/4) 6', 37', 48'; McPhillips (1/1) 64' | Report | Try: Jackson 1' c Hassell-Collins 55' m Penalty try 79'; Cornish 80+6' c Con: Jackson (2/3) 2', 80+6'; Pen: Jackson (2/3) 12' 30' |

Welford Road
Attendance: 0
Referee: Wayne Barnes

5 March 2021
20:00

| Sale Sharks | 31 – 16 | Newcastle Falcons |
| Try: Marland Yarde 2' c de Jager 14' m Hammersley 78' c Con: MacGinty (1/2) 3'; R. du Preez 79'; Pen: R. du Preez (3/3) 35', 40', 72'; MacGinty (1/1) 65' | Report | Try: Matavesi 75' c Con: Connon (1/1) 76'; Pen: Connon (3/3) 30', 39', 53' |

AJ Bell Stadium
Attendance: 0
Referee: Andrew Jackson

6 March 2021
15:00

| Bath | 16 – 38 | Exeter Chiefs (1 BP) |
| Try: McConnochie 11' c Con: Priestland (1/1) 12'; Pen: Priestland (3/3) 9', 19', 55' | Report | Try: O'Flaherty (2) 29' c, 79' c S. Simmonds 37' m S. Skinner (2) 61' c, 67' m Gray 77' c Con: J. Simmonds (4/6) 30', 62', 77', 80' |

Recreation Ground
Attendance: 0
Referee: Tom Foley

6 March 2021
15:00

| (1 BP) Wasps | 19 – 20 | Gloucester |
| Try: Gaskell 43' c Miller 48' m Bassett 71' c Con: Umaga (1/2) 44'; Gopperth (1/1) 72' | Report | Try: Socino 17' c Harris 34' c Con: Barton (2/2) 19', 34'; Pen: Barton (1/1) 32'; Twelvetrees (1/2) 78' |

Ricoh Arena
Attendance: 0
Referee: Matthew Carley

6 March 2021
17:15

| (1 BP) Worcester Warriors | 23 – 24 | Bristol Bears (1 BP) |
| Try: Humphreys 30' c Venter 48' c Con: Shillcock (1/1) 31'; Searle (1/1) 49'; Pen: Searle (3/3) 35', 46', 54' | Report | Try: Naulago (3) 5' m, 27' m, 72' c Uren 40+2' c Con: Sheedy (2/4) 40+3', 73' |

Sixways
Attendance: 0
Referee: Craig Maxwell-Keys

7 March 2021
15:00

| (1 BP) Harlequins | 37 – 19 | Northampton Saints |
| Try: Green 8' c Lewies 11' c Brown 32' c Herron 80' c Con: Smith (4/4) 9', 11' 33', 80+1'; Pen: Smith (3/3) 2', 39', 54' | Report | Try: Collins 6' m James 14' c Sleightholme 48' c Con: Hutchinson (2/3) 14', 49' |

Twickenham Stoop
Attendance: 0
Referee: Luke Pearce

==== Round 13 ====
12 March 2021
19:45

| (1 BP) Bristol Bears | 37 – 20 | Wasps |
| Try: O'Conor 20' c Joyce 56' c Adeolokun 67' c Vui 80+2' c Con: Eden (4/4) 20', 57', 68', 80+3'; Pen: Eden (3/6) 26', 35', 38' | Report | Try: Vailanu 16' c Bassett 79' c Con: Gopperth (2/2) 16', 79'; Pen: Gopperth (2/3) 7', 40+1' |

Ashton Gate
Attendance: 0
Referee: Karl Dickson

13 March 2021
12:30

| Exeter Chiefs | 21 – 20 | Harlequins (1 BP) |
| Try: Townsend 22' c Williams 61' c Ewers 75' c Con: J. Simmonds (3/3) 23', 62', 76' | Report | Try: Care 14' c Baldwin 47'c Con: Smith (2/2) 15', 48'; Pen: Smith (2/2) 34', 54' |

Sandy Park
Attendance: 0
Referee: Craig Maxwell-Keys

13 March 2021
12:30

| Newcastle Falcons | 19 – 38 | Bath (1 BP) |
| Try: Davison 19' c Penny 34' m Penalty try 80+3'; Con: Connon (1/2) 20' | Report | Try: Underhill 4' m Mercer 13' c Dunn (2) 28' c, 55' c Thomas 47' m Walker 62' c Con: Schoeman (2/3) 14', 29'; Spencer (2/3) 56', 63' |

Kingston Park
Attendance: 0
Referee: Ian Tempest

13 March 2021
14:45

| Northampton Saints | 17 – 14 | Sale Sharks (1 BP) |
| Try: Harrison 19' m Pen: Grayson (4/4) 33', 47', 56', 61' | Report | Try: J. du Preez 57' c de Jager 65' c Con: MacGinty (2/2) 59', 65' |

Franklin's Gardens
Attendance: 0
Referee: Matthew Carley

13 March 2021
15:00

| (1 BP) Gloucester | 14 – 20 | Leicester Tigers |
| Try: Carreras 17' c Slater 43' c Con: Barton (2/2) 19', 44' | Report | Try: T. Youngs 22' c Kelly 28' m Wells 55' m Con: Henry (1/3) 23'; Pen: Henry (1/1) 33' |

Kingsholm
Attendance: 0
Referee: Adam Leal

14 March 2021
13:00

| London Irish | 20 – 17 | Worcester Warriors (1 BP) |
| Try: Meehan 9' c Mafi 33' c Con: Jackson (2/2) 10', 35'; Pen: Jackson (2/2) 3', 74' | Report | Try: Annett 49' c Clegg 70' c Con: Searle(2/2) 50', 71'; Pen: Searle (1/3) 5' |

Brentford Community Stadium
Attendance: 0
Referee: Luke Pearce

==== Round 14 ====
19 March 2021
19:45

| (1 BP) Newcastle Falcons | 18 – 20 | Wasps |
| Try: Fuser 13' c Wacokecoke 36' m Con: Hodgson (1/2) 14'; Pen: Hodgson (2/2) 3', 27' | Report | Try: Shields 46' c West 63' c Con: Gopperth (2/2) 47', 63'; Pen: Gopperth (2/2) 10', 31' |

Kingston Park
Attendance: 0
Referee: Anthony Woodthorpe

20 March 2021
14:00

| (1 BP) Bath | 47 – 22 | Worcester Warriors (1 BP) |
| Try: Muir (2) 2' m, 23' c Dunn (2) 7' c, 50' c Mercer 18' c Spencer 27' c Clark 40+2' c Con: Priestland (5/6) 8', 19', 24', 28', 40+3'; Bailey (1/1) 52' | Report | Try: Batley 40+1' m Humphreys (2) 46' m, 74' m Waller 77' c Con: Smith (1/4) 78' |

Recreation Ground
Attendance: 0
Referee: Adam Leal

20 March 2021
14:00

| (1 BP) Harlequins | 59 – 24 | Gloucester |
| Try: Northmore (2) 10' m, 72' c Brown 16' c Murley 19' m Care (2) 26' c, 58' c Green 62' c Dombrandt (2) 70' c, 80+2' c Con: Smith (4/6) 17', 27' 58', 63'; Herron (3/3) 70', 73', 80+3' | Report | Try: Chapman (2) 34' c, 53' c Clarke 51' c Con: Barton (3/3) 35', 52', 54'; Pen: Barton (1/1) 44' |

Twickenham Stoop
Attendance: 0
Referee: Ian Tempest

20 March 2021
14:30

| (1 BP) Exeter Chiefs | 47 – 31 | Leicester Tigers (1 BP) |
| Try: Williams 12' c O'Flaherty 22' c Ewers 29' c H. Skinner 32' c S. Simmonds 43' c Woodburn 50' m Vermeulen 74' c Con: J. Simmonds (6/7) 12', 23', 30', 33', 44', 75' | Report | Try: Lavanini 36' c van Poortvliet 40+2' m Scott 48' c Clare 58' c Liebenberg 67' m Con: Henry (1/2) 37'; McPhillips (2/3) 48', 60' |

Sandy Park
Attendance: 0
Referee: Jack Makepeace

21 March 2021
15:00

| (1 BP) Northampton Saints | 21 – 28 | Bristol Bears (1 BP) |
| Try: Isiekwe 40+4' c Furbank 56' m Con: Grayson (1/2) 40+5'; Pen: Grayson (3/3) 46', 50', 60' | Report | Try: Purdy 25' c Naulago 30' c Morahan 75' c Uren 77' c Con: Eden (2/2) 26', 32'; Bedlow (2/2) 76', 78' |

Franklin's Gardens
Attendance: 0
Referee: Tom Foley

21 March 2021
15:00

| (1 BP) Sale Sharks | 41 – 13 | London Irish |
| Try: Hammersley 6' c de Jager 31' m McGuigan (3) 35' c,64' m, 80' c Reed 49' c Con: R. du Preez (3/5) 6', 36', 50'; MacGinty (1/1) 80+1'; Pen: MacGinty (1/1) 74' | Report | Try: Donnell 71' c Con: Jackson (1/1) 71'; Pen: Jackson (2/2) 12', 42' |

AJ Bell Stadium
Attendance: 0
Referee: Craig Maxwell-Keys

==== Round 15 ====
26 March 2021
17:30

| (1 BP) Gloucester | 34 – 18 | Exeter Chiefs |
| Try: Walker (2) 4' c, 25' c Chapman 53' c Penalty try 80'; Con: Barton (3/3) 5', 27', 53'; Pen: Barton (2/2) 59', 78' | Report | Try: Hodge 7' m Armand 17' c Con: H. Skinner (1/2) 17'; Pen: H. Skinner (2/3) 14', 72' |

Kingsholm
Attendance: 0
Referee: Luke Pearce

27 March 2021
14:00

| (1 BP) Bristol Bears | 35 – 33 | Harlequins (1 BP) |
| Try: Attwood 5' c Harding 22' c O'Conor 32' c Penalty try 76'; Sinckler 80+1' c Con: Sheedy (4/4) 6', 23', 33', 80+3' | Report | Try: Penalty try 12'; Care 24' c Marchant 68' c Con: Smith (2/2) 25', 69'; Pen: Smith (3/4) 40+2', 44', 78'; Drop: Care (1/1) 55' |

Ashton Gate
Attendance: 0
Referee: Hamish Smales

27 March 2021
15:00

| (1 BP) London Irish | 36 – 33 | Bath (2 BP) |
| Try: Loader (2) 24' c, 61' c Rogerson 31' c Parton 56' c Rona 67' m Con: Jackson (4/5) 25', 32', 56', 62'; Pen: Jackson (1/2) 12' | Report | Try: Muir 8' c Watson 42' c McNally 73' m Walker 80' m Con: Spencer (2/4) 9', 43'; Pen: Spencer (3/4) 17', 28', 53' |

Brentford Community Stadium
Attendance: 0
Referee: Craig Maxwell-Keys

27 March 2021
15:00

| Worcester Warriors | 14 – 62 | Northampton Saints (1 BP) |
| Try: Ashton 19' c Pennell 80+1' c Con: Searle (1/1) 20'; Smith (1/1) 80+2' | Report | Try: Furbank 4' m Sleightholme (4) 40' c, 53' m, 76' c, 77' c Mitchell 43' c Francis 61' c Penalty try 66'; Ribbans 71' c Con: Grayson (6/8) 40+1', 44', 62', 72', 76', 79'; Pen: Grayson (1/1) 26' |

Sixways
Attendance: 0
Referee: Andrew Jackson

27 March 2021
16:30

| (1 BP) Wasps | 19 – 20 | Sale Sharks |
| Try: Fekitoa 16' c Con: Gopperth (1/1) 17'; Pen: Gopperth (4/4) 23', 51', 61', 70' | Report | Try: van der Merwe 12' c Beaumont 78' c Con: R. du Preez (2/2) 14', 80'; Pen: R. du Preez (2/2) 26', 40+1' |

Ricoh Arena
Attendance: 0
Referee: Christophe Ridley

28 March 2021
15:00

| Leicester Tigers | 26 – 12 | Newcastle Falcons |
| Try: Liebenberg 14' c Clare 77' c Con: Ford (2/2) 14', 78'; Pen: Ford (4/4) 27', 35', 40+1', 64' | Report | Try: Welch 60' c Stuart 79' m Con: Connon (1/2) 61' |

Welford Road
Attendance: 0
Referee: Karl Dickson

==== Round 16 ====
16 April 2021
19:45

| (1 BP) Northampton Saints | 44 – 26 | London Irish (1 BP) |
| Try: Dingwall 12' c Mitchell (2) 26' c, 28' m Sleightholme (2) 52' m, 70' c Francis 58' c Con: Biggar (4/6) 13', 26', 59', 71'; Pen: Biggar (2/2) 18', 40+1' | Report | Try: Phipps 9' c Hassell-Collins 21' c Tuisue 46' m Loader 73' c Con: Jackson (3/4) 11', 22', 73' |

Franklin's Gardens
Attendance: 0 (Note: Match played behind closed doors due to national restrictions surrounding the COVID-19 pandemic.)
Referee: Wayne Barnes

17 April 2021
12:30

| (1 BP) Exeter Chiefs | 43 – 13 | Wasps |
| Try: Devoto 5' m Hill 12' m Hogg (2) 50' c, 78' c Cordero 52' m Francis 70' m J. Simmonds 74' c Con: J. Simmonds (4/7) 51', 71', 75', 79' | Report | Try: Bassett 32' c Con: Umaga (1/1) 33'; Pen: Umaga (2/2) 8', 29' |

Sandy Park
Attendance: 0
Referee: Tom Foley

17 April 2021
12:30

| Sale Sharks | 25 – 22 | Gloucester (1 BP) |
| Try: de Klerk 7' c Reed 21' m Yarde 54' c Con: R. du Preez (1/2) 8'; MacGinty (1/1) 55'; Pen: MacGinty (2/2) 43', 71' | Report | Try: May 16' m Carreras 58' c Heinz 63' c Con: Twelvetrees (2/3) 59', 64'; Pen: Barton (1/1) 26' |

AJ Bell Stadium
Attendance: 0
Referee: Adam Leal

17 April 2021
17:00

| (1 BP) Harlequins | 50 – 26 | Worcester Warriors (1 BP) |
| Try: Care 3' m Smith 8' c Esterhuizen 25' c Louw 31' c Evans (2) 40' m, 51' c Green 60' c Northmore 71' m Con: Smith (5/8) 9', 26', 31', 53', 60' | Report | Try: Annett 6' c Batley 11' c Palframan 79' c Hearle 80' m Con: Searle (3/4) 7', 12', 79' |

Twickenham Stoop
Attendance: 0
Referee: Craig Maxwell-Keys

17 April 2021
17:00

| Newcastle Falcons | 17 – 34 | Bristol Bears (1 BP) |
| Try: Young 15' c Cooper 79' c Con: Flood (2/2) 16', 79'; Pen: Flood (1/1) 25' | Report | Try: Heenan 28' c Malins (2) 31' c, 71' c Morahan 40' m Earl 56' m Con: Lloyd (3/5) 29', 32', 72'; Pen: Lloyd (1/1) 53' |

Kingston Park
Attendance: 0
Referee: Christophe Ridley

18 April 2021
15:00

| Bath | 21 – 20 | Leicester Tigers (1 BP) |
| Try: Muir (2) 20' c, 78' c Reid 66' c Con: Spencer (3/3) 21', 67', 80' | Report | Try: Moroni 44' m Pen: Ford (5/5) 13', 16', 37', 58', 73' |

Recreation Ground
Attendance: 0
Referee: Luke Pearce

==== Round 17 ====
23 April 2021
19:45

| Bristol Bears | 12 – 20 | Exeter Chiefs |
| Try: Uren 13' m Morahan 78' c Con: Lloyd (1/1) 78' | Report | Try: S. Skinner 26' m O'Flaherty 32' c Vermeulen 55' m Con: J. Simmonds (1/3) 33'; Pen: J. Simmonds (1/1) 40' |

Ashton Gate
Attendance: 0

24 April 2021
12:30

| (1 BP) London Irish | 21 – 25 | Harlequins |
| Try: Loader 51' c Hassell-Collins 61' m Con: Jackson (1/2) 52'; Pen: Jackson (3/3) 10', 21', 37' | Report | Try: Brown 29' c Murley 40+1' m Smith 80' c Con: Smith (2/3) 30', 80+1'; Pen: Smith (2/2) 35', 56' |

Brentford Community Stadium
Attendance: 0

24 April 2021
15:00

| (1 BP) Gloucester | 35 – 24 | Newcastle Falcons |
| Try: Rees-Zammit 8' c Evans 66' c Ackermann 43' c Heinz (2) 50' c, 78' c Con: Evans (4/4) 9', 44', 51', 67'; Twelvetrees (1/1) 80' | Report | Try: Chick (2) 4' c, 17' c McGuigan 12' c Con: Connon (3/3) 6', 14', 19'; Pen: Connon (1/1) 58' |

Kingsholm
Attendance: 0

24 April 2021
15:00

| (1 BP) Leicester Tigers | 18 – 23 | Northampton Saints |
| Try: Nadolo (2) 37' c, 63' m Con: Ford (1/2) 39'; Pen: Ford (2/3) 18', 59' | Report | Try: Ribbans 11' m Hutchinson 24' c Matavesi 46' m Con: Biggar (1/3) 25'; Pen: Biggar (2/2) 40', 42' |

Mattioli Welford Road
Attendance: 0

24 April 2021
15:00

| (2 BP) Worcester Warriors | 32 – 35 | Sale Sharks (1 BP) |
| Try: Shillcock 20' m Hougaard (3) 44' c, 73' c, 79' c Con: Shillcock (3/4) 44', 74', 79'; Pen: Shillcock (2/3) 16', 26' | Report | Try: Doherty 32' c McGuigan 47' c Reed 67' c Oosthuizen 71' c D. du Preez 77' c Con: MacGinty (4/4) 33', 48', 67', 72'; Wilkinson (1/1) 78' |

Sixways
Attendance: 0

25 April 2021
15:00

| (1 BP) Wasps | 39 – 29 | Bath (1 BP) |
| Try: Young (2) 7' m, 74' c Bassett 37' c Le Bourgeois 47' c Odogwu 78' c Con: Umaga (4/5) 38', 48', 75', 80'; Pen: Umaga (2/3) 36', 55' | Report | Try: Reid 29' m McNally 51' c Obano 60' c Spencer 70' c Con: Bailey (3/4) 52', 60', 71'; Pen: Bailey (1/1) 46' |

Ricoh Arena
Attendance: 0

==== Round 18 ====
7 May 2021
19:45

| Sale Sharks | 26 – 10 | Leicester Tigers |
| Try: McGuigan 11' c Yarde 67' c Con: MacGinty (2/2) 13', 69'; Pen: MacGinty (4/4) 7', 19', 28', 44' | Report | Try: Penalty try 54'; Pen: Henry (1/1) 35' |

AJ Bell Stadium
Attendance: 0
Referee: Tom Foley

8 May 2021
14:00

| Northampton Saints | 7 – 31 | Gloucester Rugby (1 BP) |
| Try: Taylor 71' c Con: Hutchinson (1/1) 72' | Report | Try: Rees-Zammit (2) 15' c, 61' m Slater 47' m Singleton 56' m Con: Twelvetrees (1/4) 16'; Pen: Twelvetrees (3/4) 4', 53', 80+2' |

Franklin's Gardens
Attendance: 0
Referee: Ian Tempest

8 May 2021
15:00

| (1 BP) Exeter Chiefs | 41 – 10 | Worcester Warriors |
| Try: Slade 23' m Ewers 46' c S. Simmonds (2) 52' c, 62' m Townsend 77' c Vermeulen 80' c Con: J. Simmonds (4/6) 47', 53', 78', 80+1'; Pen: J. Simmonds (1/1) 39' | Report | Try: Venter 18' c Con: Shillcock (1/1) 19'; Pen: Shillcock (1/1) 6' |

Sandy Park
Attendance: 0
Referee: Anthony Woodthorpe

8 May 2021
15:00

| (1 BP) Newcastle Falcons | 52 – 27 | London Irish (1 BP) |
| Try: McGuigan (2) 26' c, 50' c Robinson (2) 31' c, 78' c Schreuder 44' c Stevenson 54' c Penny 70' c Con: Connon (7/7) 26', 32', 45', 52', 55', 72', 79'; Pen: Connon (1/1) 61' | Report | Try: Parton 7' m Loader (2) 40+4' c 56' c Matu'u 65' c Con: Jackson (2/4) 40+5', 57'; Pen: Jackson (1/1) 37' |

Kingston Park
Attendance: 0
Referee: Jack Makepeace

8 May 2021
16:30

| Bath | 20 – 40 | Bristol Bears (1 BP) |
| Try: Watson (2) 12' m, 67' m Priestland 14' c Con: Spencer (1/2) 14'; Pen: Spencer (1/1) 30' | Report | Try: Hughes 37' c Penalty try 50'; Malins (2) 55' c, 80+1' m C. Piutau 63' c Earl 72' c Con: Sheedy (3/3) 38', 56', 64'; Lloyd (1/2) 74' |

Recreation Ground
Attendance: 0
Referee: Luke Pearce

9 May 2021
15:00

| (1 BP) Harlequins | 48 – 46 | Wasps (2 BP) |
| Try: Marchant 12' c Smith (2) 37' c, 80' c Lang 24' c Care 52' c Dombrandt 61' c Con: Smith (6/6) 13', 25', 38', 53', 62', 80+2'; Pen: Smith (2/2) 40+3, 75' | Report | Try: Bassett (2) 16' c, 65' c Odogwu 20' c Robson 35' m Fekitoa 35' c Young 49' c Con: Umaga (5/6) 17', 21', 46', 50', 66'; Pen: Umaga (2/2) 10', 73' |

Twickenham Stoop
Attendance: 0
Referee: Wayne Barnes

==== Round 19 ====
14 May 2021
19:45

| (1 BP) Bath | 20 – 24 | Sale Sharks (1 BP) |
| Try: Redpath 5' c Bayliss 20' c Con: Priestland (2/2) 6', 21'; Pen: Priestland (2/2) 39', 55' | Report | Try: du Preez 10' c McGuigan 36' m Hammersley 40+1' m Langdon 77' c Con: MacGinty (2/4) 11', 78' |

Recreation Ground
Attendance: 0
Referee: Karl Dickson

15 May 2021
15:00

| Wasps | 23 – 19 | Worcester Warriors (1 BP) |
| Try: Shields 6' c Taylor 66' c Con: Umaga (2/2) 7', 67'; Pen: Umaga (3/3) 33', 38', 47' | Report | Try: Lewis 50' c Con: Searle (1/1) 51'; Pen: Searle (4/4) 3', 44', 54', 57' |

Ricoh Arena
Attendance: 0
Referee: Ian Tempest

15 May 2021
15:30

| (1 BP) Leicester Tigers | 35 – 29 | Harlequins (2 BP) |
| Try: Scott 4' c Genge (2) 10' c, 39' m T. Youngs 18' c Con: Ford (3/4) 5', 11', 20'; Pen: Ford (2/2) 32', 44'; Henry (1/1) 74' | Report | Try: Earle (2) 13' m, 71' m Penalty try 24'; Marchant 53' c Northmore 76' m Con: Smith (1/4) 54' |

Welford Road
Attendance: 0
Referee: Luke Pearce

17 May 2021
19:30

| Newcastle Falcons | 18 – 10 | Northampton Saints |
| Try: Radwan 56' c Obonna 62' m Con: Connon (1/2) 57'; Pen: Connon (2/3) 40+4', 78' | Report | Try: Hill 51' c Con: Grayson (1/1) 52'; Pen: Grayson (1/2) 38' |

Kingston Park
Attendance: 1,750 (Note: Capacity limited to maximum of 25% due to national restrictions surrounding the COVID-19 pandemic.)
Referee: Matthew Carley

17 May 2021
19:45

| (1 BP) Bristol Bears | 39 – 7 | Gloucester |
| Try: Sinckler 13' m Malins 27' c C. Piutau 65' m Earl 66' c Hughes 72' c Radradra 80+1' c Con: Sheedy (4/6) 28', 68', 73', 80+3'; Pen: Sheedy (2/2) 7', 11' | Report | Try: Carreras 37' c Con: Twelvetrees (1/1) 38' |

Ashton Gate
Attendance: 3,128
Referee: Craig Maxwell-Keys

18 May 2021
19:45

| London Irish | 12 – 31 | Exeter Chiefs (1 BP) |
| Try: Donnell 12' c Loader 30' m Con: Jackson (1/2) 14' | Report | Try: S. Simmonds (3) 7' c, 24' c, 71' c J. Simmonds 19' m O'Flaherty 49' m Con: J. Simmonds (3/5) 7', 25', 73' |

Brentford Community Stadium
Attendance: 3,988
Referee: Christophe Ridley

==== Round 20 ====
28 May 2021
19:45

| Sale Sharks | 22 – 12 | Bristol Bears |
| Try: D. du Preez 61' m R. du Preez 64' c Langdon 70' c Con: MacGinty (2/3) 65', 72'; Pen: MacGinty (1/1) 79' | Report | Try: Earl 45' m Lloyd 74' c Con: Sheedy (1/2) 74' |

AJ Bell Stadium
Attendance:
Referee: Christophe Ridley

28 May 2021
19:45

| (1 BP) Gloucester | 30 – 28 | London Irish (1 BP) |
| Try: Carreras 6' m Heinz 12' c Moyle 35' c Rees-Zammit 50' m Con: Twelvetrees (2/3) 13', 35'; Pen: Twelvetrees (2/2) 67', 80+2' | Report | Try: Rona 3' m Goodrick-Clarke 20' c Tuisue 40+2' c Con: Jackson (2/3) 21', 40+3'; Pen: Jackson (3/4) 16', 31', 74' |

Kingsholm
Attendance:
Referee: Matthew Carley

29 May 2021
14:00

| (1 BP) Harlequins | 44 – 33 | Bath (1 BP) |
| Try: Kenningham 5' m Care 17' c Marchant 31' c Northmore 33' c Lewis 60' c Landajo 78' m Con: Smith (4/5) 18', 31', 34', 61'; Pen: Smith (2/6) 11', 40+1' | Report | Try: McNally 20' m Muir (2) 26' c, 42' m Bayliss 52' c Con: Priestland (2/4) 27', 53'; Pen: Priestland (3/3) 9', 30', 50' |

Twickenham Stoop
Attendance:
Referee: Tom Foley

30 May 2021
15:00

| (1 BP) Worcester Warriors | 17 – 18 | Leicester Tigers |
| Try: Shillcock 5' c Hill 37' c Con: Shillcock (2/2) 6', 38'; Pen: Shillcock (1/2) 43' | Report | Try: Genge (2) 45' m, 56' c Con: Henry (1/2) 57'; Pen: Henry (2/4) 11', 31' |

Sixways
Attendance:
Referee: Karl Dickson

29 May 2021
16:30

| Northampton Saints | 30 – 25 | Wasps (1 BP) |
| Try: Matavesi 3' c Penalty try 25'; Wood 70' c Con: Biggar (2/2) 4', 71'; Pen: Biggar (3/3) 32', 48', 63' | Report | Try: Robson 20' c Shields 29' c T. Willis 80' m Con: Umaga (1/2) 21'; Atkinson (1/1) 30'; Pen: Umaga (2/2) 40', 67' |

Franklin's Gardens
Attendance:
Referee: Adam Leal

30 May 2021
13:30

| (1 BP) Exeter Chiefs | 74 – 3 | Newcastle Falcons |
| Try: S. Skinner 3' c S. Simmonds 19' m Cuthbert 30' c Slade (2) 34' m, 53' m Vermeulen (2) 40' c, 44' c J. Simmonds 56' c Ewers 63' c Hogg 69' m H. Skinner 72' c O'Flaherty 78' m Con: J. Simmonds (7/12) 4', 31', 40+2', 45', 57', 65', 73' | Report | Pen: Flood (1/1) 7' |

Sandy Park
Attendance:
Referee: Andrew Jackson

==== Round 21 ====
4 June 2021
19:45

| (1 BP) Sale Sharks | 45 – 12 | Harlequins |
| Try: van der Merwe 12' c Yarde 23' c McGuigan 29' m Neild 39' c Janse van Rensburg 56' c Rodd 66' c J. du Preez 75' m Con: MacGinty (3/4) 13', 24', 40+1'; R. du Preez (2/3) 57', 67' | Report | Try: Landajo 4' c Edwards 69' m Con: Edwards (1/2) 5' |

AJ Bell Stadium
Attendance:
Referee: Wayne Barnes

5 June 2021
14:00

| Gloucester | Cancelled (Note: Gloucester have returned a number of positive COVID-19 tests and are therefore unable to field a side.); 0 – 0 (Note: Bath awarded a win.) | Bath |

Kingsholm

5 June 2021
15:00

| (1 BP) Leicester Tigers | 23 – 26 | Bristol Bears (1 BP) |
| Try: Liebenberg 54' c Montoya 65' c Con: McPhillips (2/2) 55', 67'; Pen: McPhillips (3/4) 5', 37', 45' | Report | Try: Radradra (2) 21' c, 59' c Randall 39' c Malins 56' m Con: Sheedy (3/4) 22', 40', 60' |

Welford Road
Attendance:
Referee: Ian Tempest

5 June 2021
15:00

| (1 BP) Newcastle Falcons | 24 – 14 | Worcester Warriors |
| Try: Radwan (2) 4' m, 19' m McGuigan 12' c Robinson 56' c Con: Connon (2/4) 14', 58' | Report | Try: Shillcock 70' c Hill 77' c Con: Weir (1/1) 70'; Shillcock (1/1) 78' |

Kingston Park
Attendance:
Referee: Luke Pearce

5 June 2021
16:30

| (2 BP) London Irish | 36 – 39 | Wasps (1 BP) |
| Try: Rona (2) 2' c, 20' c Hassell-Collins 6' m Tuisue (2) 34' c, 39' c Con: Jackson (4/5) 3', 21', 35', 40+1'; Pen: Jackson (1/2) 61' | Report | Try: Bassett (2) 31' c, 66' c T. Willis (3) 42' m, 57' m, 80+6' c Watson 47' m Con: Umaga (3/6) 31', 67', 80+8'; Pen: Umaga (1/1) 18' |

Brentford Community Stadium
Attendance:
Referee: Tom Foley

6 June 2021
15:00

| (1 BP) Northampton Saints | 26 – 29 | Exeter Chiefs (1 BP) |
| Try: Hutchinson (2) 7' m, 19' c Haywood 60' c Con: Biggar (1/3) 20'; Pen: Biggar (2/2) 35', 53'; Drop: Biggar (1/1) 39' | Report | Try: S. Skinner 44' m Hogg 49' c Townsend 58' c Devoto 63' c Con: J. Simmonds (3/4) 50', 59', 64'; Pen: J. Simmonds (1/1) 75' |

Franklin's Gardens
Attendance:
Referee: Craig Maxwell-Keys

==== Round 22 ====
12 June 2021
15:00

| (1 BP) Bath | 30 – 24 | Northampton Saints (2 BP) |
| Try: Underhill 22' m Faletau 25' c du Toit 45' c Bayliss 80+1' m Con: Priestland (2/3) 26', 47'; Pen: Priestland (2/2) 4', 62' | Report | Try: Naiyaravoro (2) 20' c, 40' m Hutchinson 36' c Grayson 59' m Con: Grayson (2/4) 21', 37' |

Recreation Ground
Attendance: 3,000

12 June 2021
15:00

| Bristol Bears | Cancelled; 0 – 0 (Note: Bristol Bears awarded a win.) | London Irish |

Ashton Gate
Attendance:

12 June 2021
15:00

| Exeter Chiefs | 20 – 19 | Sale Sharks (1 BP) |
| Try: Cowan-Dickie 60' c Townsend 66' c Con: J. Simmonds (2/2) 62', 67'; Pen: J. Simmonds (2/2) 7', 71' | Report | Try: McGuigan 2' c MacGinty 22' c Reed 43' m Con: MacGinty (2/3) 3', 22' |

Sandy Park
Attendance: 3,327

12 June 2021
15:00

| (1 BP) Harlequins | 54 – 26 | Newcastle Falcons (1 BP) |
| Try: Kenningham 4' c Care (2) 15' c, 32' c Green 40+1' c Lynagh 45' m Marchant 63' c Landajo 76' c Gray 79' c Con: Smith (4/5) 5', 16', 33', 40+3', 64'; Marchant (1/1) 77'; Tapuai (1/1) 80+1' | Report | Try: McGuigan (2) 8' c, 19' m Radwan 60' c Blamire 73' c Con: Connon (2/3) 10', 60'; Hodgson (1/1) 74' |

Twickenham Stoop
Attendance:

12 June 2021
15:00

| (2 BP) Wasps | 31 – 38 | Leicester Tigers (1 BP) |
| Try: Vailanu (2) 9' c, 37' c Umaga 27' c Rowlands 57' c Con: Umaga (4/4) 10', 28', 38', 58'; Pen: Umaga (1/1) 80+3' | Report | Try: Henderson 20' c Scott 24' c Cole 35' c Montoya 47' c Lavanini 72' c Con: McPhillips (5/5) 21', 25', 36', 49', 73'; Pen: McPhillips (1/1) 31' |

Ricoh Arena
Attendance: 7,000

12 June 2021
15:00

| Worcester Warriors | Cancelled; 0 – 0 (Note: Worcester Warriors awarded a win.) | Gloucester |

Sixways

== Play-offs ==
As in previous seasons, the top four teams in the Premiership table, following the conclusion of the regular season, contest the play-off semi-finals in a 1st vs 4th and 2nd vs 3rd format, with the higher ranking team having home advantage. The two winners of the semi-finals then meet in the Premiership Final at Twickenham on 26 June 2021.

=== Bracket ===
Semi-finals
1 | Bristol Bears | 36
4 | Harlequins (a.e.t.) | 43
2 | Exeter Chiefs | 40
3 | Sale Sharks | 30

Final
4 | Harlequins | 40
2 | Exeter Chiefs | 38

=== Semi-finals ===
19 June
13:30

| Bristol Bears (1) | 36 – 43 (a.e.t.) | (4) Harlequins |
| Try: Earl 8' m Malins (3) 12' m, 22' m, 94' m Morahan 28' c Con: Sheedy (1/5) 29'; Pen: Sheedy (3/3) 4', 6', 64' | Report | Try: Dombrandt 39' m Green (2) 42' c, 90+6' c Chisholm 49' c Lynagh 54' m Marchant (2) 76' c, 100' m Con: Smith (4/7) 43', 50', 77', 90+7' |

Ashton Gate
Attendance:
Referee: Wayne Barnes

19 June
16:30

| Exeter Chiefs (2) | 40 – 30 | (3) Sale Sharks |
| Try: Cowan-Dickie 5' c O'Flaherty 10' m Nowell (2) 30' c, 51' c Cuthbert 67' m Con: J. Simmonds (3/5) 6', 31', 52'; Pen: J. Simmonds (3/3) 24', 44', 77' | Report | Try: Janse van Rensburg (2) 25' c, 46' c D. du Preez 71' c Con: R. du Preez (2/2) 26', 48'; Wilkinson (1/1) 72'; Pen: R. du Preez (3/4) 18', 35', 57' |

Sandy Park
Attendance:
Referee: Tom Foley

=== Final ===
26 June
17:30

| Exeter Chiefs (2) | 38–40 | (4) Harlequins |
| Try: Gray 17' c Hepburn 29' c S. Simmonds 49' c Devoto 54' c Hogg 78' c Con: J. Simmonds (5/5) 18', 30', 50', 55', 78' | | Try: Penalty try 7'; Louw 38' m Dombrandt 40+4' c Esterhuizen 44' c Lynagh (2) 72' c, 76' c Con: M. Smith (4/4) 40+6', 45', 73', 77' |

Twickenham
Attendance: 10,000
Referee: Matthew Carley

Team details

Exeter Chiefs
Harlequins

| FB | 15 | (England) Jack Nowell |
| RW | 14 | (Wales) Alex Cuthbert |
| OC | 13 | (England) Henry Slade |
| IC | 12 | (England) Ollie Devoto |
| LW | 11 | (England) Tom O'Flaherty |
| FH | 10 | (England) Joe Simmonds (c) |
| SH | 9 | (England) Jack Maunder |
| N8 | 8 | (England) Sam Simmonds |
| OF | 7 | (England) Richard Capstick |
| BF | 6 | (South Africa) Jannes Kirsten |
| RL | 5 | (England) Jonny Hill |
| LL | 4 | (Scotland) Jonny Gray |
| TP | 3 | (England) Harry Williams |
| HK | 2 | (England) Luke Cowan-Dickie |
| LP | 1 | (England) Alec Hepburn |
Replacements:
| HK | 16 | (England) Jack Yeandle |
| PR | 17 | (England) Ben Moon |
| PR | 18 | (England) Marcus Street |
| LK | 19 | (England) Sean Lonsdale |
| FL | 20 | (England) Don Armand |
| SH | 21 | (England) Stuart Townsend |
| FH | 22 | (England) Harvey Skinner |
| FB | 23 | (Scotland) Stuart Hogg |
Coach:
(England) Rob Baxter

| FB | 15 | (South Africa) Tyrone Green |
| RW | 14 | (England) Louis Lynagh |
| OC | 13 | (England) Joe Marchant |
| IC | 12 | (South Africa) André Esterhuizen |
| LW | 11 | (England) Cadan Murley |
| FH | 10 | (England) Marcus Smith |
| SH | 9 | (England) Danny Care |
| N8 | 8 | (England) Alex Dombrandt |
| OF | 7 | (England) Jack Kenningham |
| BF | 6 | (England) James Chisholm |
| RL | 5 | (South Africa) Stephan Lewies (c) |
| LL | 4 | (England) Matt Symons |
| TP | 3 | (South Africa) Wilco Louw |
| HK | 2 | (Wales) Scott Baldwin |
| LP | 1 | (England) Joe Marler |
Substitutions:
| HK | 16 | (England) Joe Gray |
| PR | 17 | (Argentina) Santiago García Botta |
| PR | 18 | (England) Will Collier |
| LK | 19 | (England) Dino Lamb |
| FL | 20 | (England) Tom Lawday |
| SH | 21 | (Argentina) Martín Landajo |
| CE | 22 | (Australia) Ben Tapuai |
| WG | 23 | (England) Luke Northmore |
Coach:
(Australia) Billy Millard

Touch judges:
Luke Pearce
Karl Dickson
Television Match Official:
Ian Tempest

== Leading scorers ==
Note: Flags indicate national union as has been defined under WR eligibility rules. Players may hold more than one non-WR nationality.

=== Most points ===
As of 27 June 2021

| Rank | Player | Club | Points |
|---|---|---|---|
| 1 | (England) Marcus Smith | Harlequins | 286 |
| 2 | (United States) AJ MacGinty | Sale | 188 |
| 3 | (England) Joe Simmonds | Exeter | 184 |
| 4 | (Ireland) Paddy Jackson | London Irish | 177 |
| 5 | (Wales) Rhys Priestland | Bath | 150 |
| 6 | (England) Sam Simmonds | Exeter | 105 |
| 7 | (England) Billy Twelvetrees | Gloucester | 104 |
| 8 | (England) Zack Henry | Leicester | 98 |
| 8 | (England) Jacob Umaga | Wasps | 98 |
| 10 | (England) James Grayson | Northampton | 83 |

=== Most tries ===
As of 27 June 2021

| Rank | Player | Club | Tries |
|---|---|---|---|
| 1 | (England) Sam Simmonds | Exeter | 21 |
| 2 | (England) Danny Care | Harlequins | 12 |
| 3 | (England) Alex Dombrandt | Harlequins | 10 |
| 3 | (England) Josh Bassett | Wasps | 10 |
| 3 | (Scotland) Byron McGuigan | Sale | 10 |
| 6 | (Australia) Curtis Rona | London Irish | 8 |
| 6 | (England) Tom Willis | Wasps | 8 |
| 6 | (England) Marcus Smith | Harlequins | 8 |
| 9 | (England) Will Muir | Bath | 7 |
| 9 | (England) Paolo Odogwu | Wasps | 7 |
| 9 | (England) Tom O'Flaherty | Exeter | 7 |
| 9 | (England) Ollie Sleightholme | Northampton | 7 |
| 9 | (England) Marland Yarde | Sale | 7 |
| 9 | (Fiji) Ratu Naulago | Bristol | 7 |
| 9 | (England) Joe Marchant | Harlequins | 7 |
| 9 | (England) George McGuigan | Newcastle | 7 |
| 9 | (England) Adam Radwan | Newcastle | 7 |

== Awards ==
The following received Player of the Month awards during the 2020–21 season, as selected by a panel of media commentators, in addition to monthly public polls.

| Month | Nationality | Player | Position | Club |
|---|---|---|---|---|
| November | England | Sam Simmonds | Number 8 | Exeter |
| December | England | Alfie Barbeary | Number 8 | Wasps |
| January | England | Piers O'Conor | Centre | Bristol |
| February | England | Marcus Smith | Fly-Half | Harlequins |
| March | England | Danny Care | Scrum-Half | Harlequins |
| April | England | Zach Mercer | Number 8 | Bath |
| May | England | Sam Simmonds (2) | Number 8 | Exeter |
