= England A national rugby union team =

England A
- Union: Rugby Football Union
- Coach: Mark Mapletoft
| 1st kit | 2nd kit |

First match
- England XV 29–0 Canada (30 September 1967)

Largest win
- England A 91–5 Portugal (25 February 2024)

Largest defeat
- England Saxons 0–35 Scotland A (3 February 2012)

England A is England's men's second national rugby union team. The team has previously been known by a number of names, such as England B, Emerging England and, most recently, England Saxons. England A were unbeaten for 13 games until losing to Ireland A, now known as Ireland Wolfhounds, in the 2009 Churchill Cup Final on 21 June 2009.

England A was one of three sides that regularly competed in the now-defunct annual Churchill Cup competition, the others being the full national teams of Canada and the United States. From 2006 onwards, they also regularly played two matches against other European countries in parallel with the full Six Nations Championship.

== History ==
England's second team was known as England B until 1992, when it was renamed as England A. In 2000, as part of its long-term strategic plan, the RFU re-examined the role of the 'second team' and decided that a change of name was desirable. Several names were considered – for example, England Aces and England Bloods – before the name England Saxons was chosen from a short-list of possibles. The change of name took effect from mid-May 2006, just before the start of that year's Churchill Cup.

England Saxons participated in the Churchill Cup from its inception in 2003 until its demise following the 2011 edition. Under the final format, they played three games: two at the pool stage and one on finals day. The Saxons also played two matches each season against the other teams competing in the Six Nations Championship – (France, Ireland, Italy, Scotland and Wales) – with the games being played on the same weekends as Six Nations test matches.

The team reverted to their traditional name of England A in May 2021. The name change was made ahead of the team's planned return against Scotland A that summer, having been on an extended hiatus since its two-match series win over South Africa A in 2016. However, this fixture was ultimately cancelled, due to a COVID-19 outbreak in the Scotland squad.

In November 2023, it was announced that England A would make another revival the following spring, coinciding with the 2024 Six Nations. In their first game in eight years, England A achieved their biggest ever win, defeating Portugal by 91–5 in February 2024. This marked the beginning of a more regular schedule of fixtures for the side, with another match against Australia A taking place in November of that year.

== Concept ==
England A are seen as an integral part of the RFU's development process:

England Saxons is a key part of the development pathway to the senior side...

The future success of rugby in England depends, to a large extent, on the next best 15 players.

England A will give up and coming players a platform to perform in an international environment and to show that they can make the step up when required.

— Andy Robinson (England head coach), 18 May 2006

== Recent results ==
The following is a list of England A's recent match results, since the team's revival in February 2024, as well as upcoming scheduled fixtures:

Win Draw Loss Upcoming

| 25 February 2024 | England A | 91–5 | Portugal | Welford Road, Leicester |
| 13:00 GMT (UTC+0) | Try: Blamire 2' m Pearson 5' m Barbeary 13' m Tuima 18' c Muir 24' c Murley (3) 28' c, 71' m, 75' m Hodge 33' c Ojomoh 40' c Penalty try 41'; Riley 52' m Shillcock 57' m Beard 62' c Fisilau 67' c Con: Hodge (5/6) 19', 25', 29', 34', 40+1'; Shillcock (2/5) 63', 68' | Report | Try: Vareiro 59' m Cards: Vareiro (yellow card) 18' | Attendance: 15,123; Referee: Luc Ramos (France) |
| England A: Forwards – 1. Baxter 2. Blamire 3. Heyes 4. Tuima 5. Ewels (c) 6. Pearson 7. Pepper 8. Barbeary; Backs – 9. Randall 10. Atkinson 11. Muir 12. Ojomoh 13. Beard 14. Murley 15. Hodge; Substitutes – 16. Riley 17. Haffar 18. Iosefa-Scott 19. Bamber 20. Fisilau 21. Englefield 22. Shillcock 23. Hartley | | | | Attendance: 15,123; Referee: Luc Ramos (France) |
Portugal: Forwards – 1. Arrojado 2. Vicente 3. Prim 4. Andrade 5. Fernandes 6. Ribeiro 7. F. Almeida 8. Roque; Backs – 9. Pinto 10. Vareiro 11. J. Cortes 12. Nobre 13. Leite 14. Gomes 15. A. Almeida; Substitutes – 16. Da Cunha 17. Rodrigues 18. Turabelidze 19. Batista 20. Cabaco 21. B. Almeida 22. D. Cortes 23. Da Camara

| 17 November 2024 | England A | 38–17 | Australia A | Twickenham Stoop, London |
| 14:00 GMT (UTC+0) | Try: Heyes 6' m Murley (2) 42' m, 77' c Langdon 56' c Fisilau 61' c Muir 67' c Con: Atkinson (2/4) 57', 62'; Shillcock (2/2) 68', 78' | Report | Try: Reimer 9' c Van Nek 65' c Con: Lynagh (1/1) 10'; McLaughlin-Phillips (1/1) 66'; Pen: Lynagh (1/1) 30' | Referee: Eoghan Cross (Ireland) |
| England A: Forwards – 1. Opoku-Fordjour 2. Oghre 3. Heyes 4. Tizard 5. Clark 6. Pearson 7. Pollock 8. Willis; Backs – 9. Porter 10. Atkinson 11. Ibitoye 12. Dingwall (c) 13. Beard 14. Murley 15. Carpenter; Substitutes – 16. Langdon 17. Iyogun 18. Fasogbon 19. Tuima 20. Fisilau 21. McParland 22. Shillcock 23. Muir | | | | Referee: Eoghan Cross (Ireland) |
Australia A: Forwards – 1. Hoopert 2. Nasser 3. De Lutiis 4. Smith 5. Canham 6. Hooper 7. Reimer 8. Brial; Backs – 9. R. Lonergan (c) 10. Lynagh 11. Lancaster 12. Stewart 13. Walton 14. Toole 15. Campbell; Substitutes – 16. L. Lonergan 17. Lambert 18. Van Nek 19. Blyth 20. Scott 21. Fines-Leleiwasa 22. McLaughlin-Phillips 23. Sapsford

| 23 February 2025 | England A | 28–12 | Ireland A | Ashton Gate, Bristol |
| 13:00 GMT (UTC+0) | Try: Hassell-Collins 13' c Van Poortvliet 25' c Fisilau 74' c Penalty try 80'; Con: Atkinson (2/2) 14', 26'; Shillcock (1/1) 75' | Report | Try: Bolton 17' m Gavin 76' c Con: Doak (1/1) 77'; Cards: Deegan (yellow card) 80' | Referee: Ben Breakspear (Wales) |
| England A: Forwards – 1. Brantingham 2. Langdon (vc) 3. Kloska 4. Tizard 5. Lockett 6. Pearson 7. Kenningham 8. Barbeary; Backs – 9. Van Poortvliet (c) 10. Atkinson 11. Hassell-Collins 12. Butt 13. Ojomoh 14. Elliott 15. Carpenter; Substitutes – 16. Oghre 17. Haffar 18. Green 19. Capstick 20. Fisilau 21. Porter 22. Shillcock 23. Hendy | | | | Referee: Ben Breakspear (Wales) |
Ireland A: Forwards – 1. O'Toole 2. Barron 3. Aungier 4. O'Connell 5. Murray 6. Deegan (c) 7. Kendellen 8. Jansen; Backs – 9. Doak 10. Frawley 11. Bolton 12. Gavin 13. Postlethwaite 14. O'Brien 15. Daly; Substitutes – 16. Smyth 17. McCarthy 18. Jager 19. O'Tighearnaigh 20. Soroka 21. Gunne 22. Byrne 23. Gleeson

| 21 June 2025 | England XV | 24–26 | France XV | Allianz Stadium, London |
| 15:15 BST (UTC+1) | Try: Willis 23' c Coles 27' m Carpenter 39' c Dombrandt 59' m Con: Ford (2/4) 24', 40'; Cards: Feyi-Waboso (red card) 33' | Report | Try: Barlot 6' m Auradou 9' c Malez 74' c Taofifénua 80+1' c Con: Le Garrec (1/2) 10'; Hastoy (2/2) 75', 80+2'; Cards: Woki (red card) 55' | Attendance: 34,129; Referee: Hollie Davidson (Scotland) |
| England XV: Forwards – 1. Baxter 2. George (cc) 3. Heyes 4. Coles 5. Isiekwe 6. Hill 7. Pepper 8. Willis; Backs – 9. Spencer 10. Ford (cc) 11. Feyi-Waboso 12. Atkinson 13. Slade 14. Roebuck 15. Carpenter; Substitutes – 16. Dan 17. Rodd 18. Davison 19. Cunningham-South 20. Kenningham 21. Dombrandt 22. Quirke 23. Beard | | | | Attendance: 34,129; Referee: Hollie Davidson (Scotland) |
France XV: Forwards – 1. Erdocio 2. Barlot 3. Slimani 4. Auradou 5. Duguid 6. Fischer 7. Tixeront 8. Guillard; Backs – 9. Le Garrec 10. Hastoy 11. Duguivalu 12. Fickou (c) 13. Gailleton 14. Moustin 15. Attisogbe; Substitutes – 16. Marchand 17. Mallez 18. Bamba 19. Taofifénua 20. Woki 21. Van Tonder 22. Jauneau 23. Berdeu

| 8 November 2025 | England A | 14–31 | New Zealand XV | The Recreation Ground, Bath |
| 13:15 GMT (UTC+0) | Try: Hodge 27' c Batley 77' c Con: Hodge (2/2) 28', 78' | Report | Try: Tangitau 11' m Hannah 24' c Jacomb 53' c Reihana 63' c Fakatava 75' m Con: Jacomb (3/5) 25', 54', 64' | Referee: Jérémy Rozier (France) |
| England A: Forwards – 1. Iyogun 2. Blamire 3. Fasogbon 4. Lockett 5. Batley 6. Roots (c) 7. Pearson 8. Fisilau; Backs – 9. McParland 10. Atkinson 11. Hassell-Collins 12. Ojomoh 13. Hall 14. Caluori 15. Hodge; Substitutes – 16. Tuipulotu 17. Haffar 18. Sela 19. Bamber 20. Harding 21. Englefield 22. Ma'asi-White 23. Radwan | | | | Referee: Jérémy Rozier (France) |
New Zealand XV: Forwards – 1. Numia 2. McAlister 3. Dyer 4. Howden 5. Hannah 6. Flanders 7. Papali'i (c) 8. Lio-Willie; Backs – 9. Preston 10. Jacomb 11. Reece 12. Havili 13. Ennor 14. Tangitau 15. Fihaki; Substitutes – 16. Taylor 17. Fusitua 18. Lauaki 19. Beehre 20. Jacobson 21. Fakatava 22. Reihana 23. McLeod

| 15 November 2025 | Spain | 25–29 | England A | Estadio José Zorrilla, Valladolid |
| 16:00 GMT (UTC+0) | Try: Ezeala 44' c Con: Richardis (1/1) 45'; Pen: Richardis (6/6) 8', 25', 37', 40', 59', 76'; Cards: Cian (yellow card) 20'; Bell (yellow card) 78' | Report | Try: Caluori 33' c Hendy 62' m Tuipulotu 74' c Redshaw 78' c Con: Hodge (1/2) 34'; Atkinson (2/2) 75', 79'; Pen: Hodge (1/1) 54'; Cards: Jibulu (yellow card) 7'; Michelow (yellow card) 12' | Attendance: 12,105; Referee: Morgan White (Hong Kong) |
| Spain: Forwards – 1. Futeu 2. García (c) 3. Merkler 4. Foulds 5. Urraza 6. Pichardie 7. Imaz 8. Nieto; Backs – 9. Bay 10. Richardis 11. Laforga 12. Gimeno 13. Ezeala 14. Cian 15. Bell; Substitutes – 16. Ovejero 17. Vasquez 18. Domínguez 19. Piñeiro 20. Saleta 21. Infer 22. Vinuesa 23. Mateu | | | | Attendance: 12,105; Referee: Morgan White (Hong Kong) |
England A: Forwards – 1. Iyogun 2. Jibulu 3. Fasogbon 4. Sodeke 5. Bamber 6. Michelow 7. Harding (c) 8. Fisilau; Backs – 9. Englefield 10. Atkinson 11. Hendy 12. Ma'asi-White 13. Hall 14. Caluori 15. Hodge; Substitutes – 16. Tuipulotu 17. Haffar 18. Sela 19. Owen 20. Richards 21. McParland 22. Woodward 23. Redshaw

| 6 February 2026 | Ireland XV | 14–52 | England A | Thomond Park, Limerick |
| 19:15 GMT (UTC+0) | Try: Gleeson 23' c Kenny 38' c Con: Frawley (2/2) 24', 39'; Cards: Wycherley (yellow card) 42' | Report | Try: Roots (2) 8' c, 78' c Searle 18' m Hassell-Collins (2) 28' m, 50' c Randall 35' c Kloska 43' c Murley 61' c Con: Searle (5/7) 9', 36', 44', 51', 62'; Atkinson (1/1) 79' | Referee: Benoit Rousselet (France) |
| Ireland A: Forwards – 1. Bohan 2. McCarthy 3. Wilson 4. Irvine 5. Wycherley 6. Deegan (c) 7. Ward 8. Gleeson; Backs – 9. Gunne 10. Frawley 11. Ward 12. Kelly 13. Hume 14. Kenny 15. Daly; Substitutes – 16. Barron 17. Crean 18. Aungier 19. Sheridan 20. Boyle 21. Devine 22. Ford 23. Jansen | | | | Referee: Benoit Rousselet (France) |
England A: Forwards – 1. Haffar 2. Blamire 3. Kloska 4. Bamber 5. Batley 6. Roots (c) 7. Kenningham 8. Dombrandt; Backs – 9. Randall 10. Searle 11. Hassell-Collins 12. Bailey 13. Northmore 14. Murley 15. Carpenter; Substitutes – 16. Tuipulotu 17. Van der Flier 18. Fasogbon 19. Tizard 20. Harding 21. Quirke 22. Atkinson 23. Hendy

| 19 June 2026 | France XV | 35–19 | England XV | Stade de la Rabine, Vannes |
| 18:15 CET (UTC+1) | Try: Depoortère 8' c Arfeuil 20' c Le Garrec 46' c Hastoy 50' c Brau-Boirie 78' c Con: Hastoy (4/4) 9', 21', 47', 51'; Desperes (1/1) 79' | Report | Try: Murley 1' m Smith 40' c Ojomoh 80+2' c Con: Ford (2/3) 40+1', 80+3' | Referee: Gianluca Gnecchi (Italy) |
| France XV: Forwards – 1. Poirot 2. Lamothe 3. Falatea 4. Guillard 5. Staniforth 6. Matiu 7. Capilla 8. Gazzotti; Backs – 9. Le Garrec 10. Hastoy 11. Arfeuil 12. Moefana 13. Depoortère 14. Ambadiang 15. Attissogbe; Substitutes – 16. Massa 17. Wardi 18. Montagne 19. Palu 20. Tixeront 21. Jauneau 22. Desperes 23. Brau-Boirie | | | | Referee: Gianluca Gnecchi (Italy) |
England XV: Forwards – 1. Opoku-Fordjour 2. Dan 3. Kloska 4. Ewels 5. Martin 6. Hill 7. Curry 8. Dombrandt; Backs – 9. Randall 10. Ford (c) 11. Murley 12. Atkinson 13. Ojomoh 14. Caluori 15. Smith; Substitutes – 16. Blamire 17. Obano 18. Sela 19. Isiekwe 20. Kenningham 21. Quirke 22. Janse van Rensburg 23. Radwan

| 6 November 2026 | England A | 59–24 | Argentina XV | The Recreation Ground, Bath |
| 19:45 GMT (UTC+0) | Try: Caluori (2) 2' c, 27' c Ojomoh 19' c Atkinson 24' c Kenningham 44' m Blamire 48' m Northmore 56' c Elliott 69' c Con: Atkinson (5/7) 3', 20', 25', 28', 57'; Searle (1/1) 70'; Cards: Van der Flier (yellow card) 8' | Report | Try: Fernández 7' c Delgado 14' c Pernas 38' m Serpa 51' m Con: Serpa (2/4) 8', 14' | Referee: Nika Amashukeli (Georgia) |
| England A: Forwards – 1. Van der Flier 2. Blamire 3. Fasogbon 4. Batley 5. Bamber 6. Roots 7. Kenningham 8. Harding (c); Backs – 9. Englefield 10. Atkinson 11. Hendy 12. Ojomoh 13. Northmore 14. Caluori 15. Carpenter; Substitutes – 16. Jibulu 17. O'Driscoll 18. Kloska 19. Lockett 20. Hicks 21. Friday 22. Searle 23. Elliott | | | | Referee: Nika Amashukeli (Georgia) |
Argentina XV: Forwards – 1. Correa 2. Vivas 3. Delgado 4. Fernández 5. Ocampo 6. D'Amorim (c) 7. Penoucos 8. Grondona; Backs – 9. Viola 10. Serpa 11. Rossetto 12. Ordiz 13. Fraga 14. Pernas 15. Wade; Substitutes – 16. Lusarreta 17. Calles 18. Galvan 19. Sluga 20. Sarelli 21. Sugasti 22. Martín 23. Osadczuk

| 20 February 2027 | England A | v | Ireland XV | Sandy Park, Exeter |
| 19:00 GMT (UTC+0) |

| 26 February 2027 | England A | v | Chile | Kingsholm, Gloucester |
| 19:45 GMT (UTC+0) |

== Squad ==
In November 2026, England named their 'A' squad for the match against Argentina XV, played on 6 November 2026.

- Head Coach: (England) Mark Mapletoft (RFU)
- Attack Coach: (England) James Lightfoot Brown (Gloucester)
- Defence Coach: (England) Adam Powell (Saracens)
- Forwards Coach: (England) James Craig (Northampton)
- Scrum Coach: (England) Matt Ferguson (Harlequins) / (England) Nathan Catt (Red Roses)

Note: Players capped at senior international level are listed in bold.
Caps and clubs correct as of: 18 July 2026.

| Player | Position | Date of birth (age) | Caps | Club/province |
|---|---|---|---|---|
| **Jamie Blamire** | Hooker | 22 December 1997 (age 28) | 7 | (England) Leicester Tigers |
| Nathan Jibulu | Hooker | 26 January 2003 (age 23) | 0 | (England) Sale Sharks |
| Sam Riley | Hooker | 23 April 2001 (age 25) | 0 | (England) Harlequins |
| Afolabi Fasogbon | Prop | 24 August 2004 (age 22) | 0 | (England) Gloucester |
| Will Hobson | Prop | 9 November 2002 (age 23) | 0 | (England) Harlequins |
| **George Kloska** | Prop | 16 November 1999 (age 26) | 2 | (England) Bristol Bears |
| Alex O'Driscoll | Prop | 4 November 2004 (age 22) | 0 | (England) Saracens |
| Archie van der Flier | Prop | 25 April 2002 (age 24) | 0 | (England) Leicester Tigers |
| Ben Bamber | Lock | 24 January 2001 (age 25) | 0 | (England) Sale Sharks |
| Joe Batley | Lock | 27 June 1996 (age 30) | 0 | (England) Bristol Bears |
| Tom Lockett | Lock | 6 October 2002 (age 24) | 0 | (England) Northampton Saints |
| Fitz Harding | Back row | 26 April 1999 (age 27) | 0 | (England) Bristol Bears |
| Max Hicks | Back row | 15 September 1999 (age 27) | 0 | (England) Newcastle Red Bulls |
| Jack Kenningham | Back row | 19 November 1999 (age 26) | 0 | (England) Harlequins |
| **Ethan Roots** | Back row | 10 November 1997 (age 28) | 4 | (England) Exeter Chiefs |
| Will Trenholm | Back row | 6 September 2001 (age 25) | 0 | (England) Gloucester |
| Caolan Englefield | Scrum-half | 1 November 1999 (age 27) | 0 | (England) Gloucester |
| Lucas Friday | Scrum-half | 13 July 2006 (age 20) | 0 | (England) Harlequins |
| **Charlie Atkinson** | Fly-half | 6 October 2001 (age 25) | 1 | (England) Gloucester |
| Orlando Bailey | Fly-half | 30 September 2001 (age 25) | 0 | (England) Leicester Tigers |
| Billy Searle | Fly-half | 25 March 1996 (age 30) | 0 | (England) Leicester Tigers |
| Will Knight | Centre | 3 April 2007 (age 19) | 0 | (England) Gloucester |
| **Luke Northmore** | Centre | 16 March 1997 (age 29) | 2 | (England) Harlequins |
| **Max Ojomoh** | Centre | 14 September 2000 (age 26) | 2 | (England) Bath |
| Will Wand | Centre | 31 December 2001 (age 24) | 0 | (England) Leicester Tigers |
| **Noah Caluori** | Wing | 22 September 2006 (age 20) | 2 | (England) Saracens |
| Tobias Elliott | Wing | 16 September 2003 (age 23) | 0 | (England) Saracens |
| **Joe Carpenter** | Fullback | 19 August 2001 (age 25) | 1 | (England) Sale Sharks |
| George Hendy | Fullback | 15 October 2002 (age 24) | 0 | (England) Northampton Saints |
| James Pater | Fullback | 7 February 2007 (age 19) | 0 | (England) Northampton Saints |
