= Sam Riley (rugby union) =

English rugby union player

- Born: 23 April 2001 (age 25) Chertsey, England
- Height: 1.8 m (5 ft 11 in)
- Weight: 110 kg (17 st 5 lb; 240 lb)
- School: St George's College

Rugby union career
- Position: Hooker
- Current team: Harlequins
Senior career
Years	Team	Apps	(Points)
2019–	Harlequins	79	(70)
- Correct as of 19 December 2025
International career
Years	Team	Apps	(Points)
2018–2019	England U18	7	(5)
2020–2021	England U20	6	(25)
2024–	England A	1	(5)
- Correct as of 1 March 2024

Sam Riley (born 23 April 2001) is an English professional rugby union player who plays as a hooker for Prem Rugby club Harlequins.

== Club career ==
Riley first joined the Harlequins academy at the age of 15. In the academy he captained the under-18 side and became known for his powerful ball-carrying ability and his natural leadership qualities. He graduated to the senior side ahead of the 2019–20 season.

Riley made his first team debut against Exeter Chiefs in the Premiership Rugby Cup during the 2019–20 campaign before making his league debut against Newcastle Falcons in the opener of the 2021–22 Premiership Rugby season.

In January 2022, Riley agreed a contract extension, having made seven appearances for the first team side. By this point in his career he had already been with the Harlequins setup for six years.

In April 2024, he scored the winning try for Harlequins as they beat Glasgow Warriors 28–24 at home to help the club win their first ever Champions Cup knockout game.

In December 2025, he scored two tries in the Champions Cup during a 68–14 victory against Bayonne.

== International career ==
Riley has represented England at age grade level having competed for both the under-16 and under-18 team. He scored tries against France, Scotland, Ireland and Wales during the 2021 Six Nations Under 20s Championship. He then started in the last round of the competition as England defeated Italy at Cardiff Arms Park to complete a Grand slam.

In February 2024 Riley was called up to the England A side scoring a try in a victory over Portugal.

== Honours ==
England U20

- Six Nations Under 20s Championship: 2021
- U20s Grand Slam: 2021
