= Joe Marchant (rugby union) =

England international rugby union footballer

- Full name: Joseph Marchant
- Born: 16 July 1996 (age 30) Winchester, England
- Height: 1.83 m (6 ft 0 in)
- Weight: 89 kg (196 lb; 14 st 0 lb)
- School: Peter Symonds College

Rugby union career
- Position(s): Centre, Wing
- Current team: Sale Sharks
Senior career
Years	Team	Apps	(Points)
2014–2015	Worthing	10	(35)
2015–2023	Harlequins	152	(315)
2015	→ London Scottish (loan)	6	(0)
2020	Blues	7	(15)
2023–2026	Stade Français	73	(70)
2026–	Sale Sharks	0	(0)
- Correct as of 20 June 2026
International career
Years	Team	Apps	(Points)
2014–2015	England U18	7	(5)
2015–2016	England U20	13	(59)
2019–	England	28	(20)
- Correct as of 27 October 2023

Joseph Marchant (born 16 July 1996) is an English professional rugby union player who plays as a centre for PREM Rugby club Sale Sharks and the England national team.

== Early life ==
Marchant was born on 16 July 1996 in Winchester. He began playing rugby at the age of 6. He studied at Peter Symonds College, taking a BTEC Extended Diploma in sport and was captain of the rugby side there. Marchant has also been schooled at Littleton and Harestock and Henry Beaufort. He played for Winchester RFC as a school boy from 2002–12 and Symondians in 2013. He represented Hampshire rugby from u14-u18.

Marchant is also a Black belt in Karate.

== Club career ==
In 2014 Marchant joined the Harlequins academy and made his club debut against Newcastle Falcons in May 2015. On 10 November 2019, the Blues, Auckland's Super Rugby team, announced that they had signed Marchant on their Instagram account. It was confirmed via their own website that he would be playing with them as part of a sabbatical clause provided by Harlequins to further his international experience and possibility of an England call up. He featured in seven games and scored three tries during the 2020 Super Rugby season.

In September 2020 Marchant started for the Harlequins side that lost to Sale Sharks in the final of the Premiership Rugby Cup. The following year saw him score two tries during Harlequins 43-36 defeat of Bristol Bears in the Premiership semi-final, a game in which Quins recovered from 28 points down to win. He started the following week in the 2021 Premiership final against Exeter Chiefs. Harlequins won the game 40-38 in the highest scoring Premiership final ever.

In December 2022 it was announced that Marchant would leave Quins to join Stade Français. In his last season with the club he scored a try in the 2025–26 Top 14 season quarter-final victory over La Rochelle. They were eliminated at the semi-final stage by Montpellier.

In November 2025, Marchant signed for PREM Rugby club Sale Sharks ahead of the following season.

== International career ==
Marchant represented England U18 winning 14 caps and scoring one try. He has also represented England U20 scoring 59 points including ten tries. Marchant was a member of the side that won the 2015 Six Nations Under 20s Championship. The following year Marchant was included in the squad for the 2016 World Rugby Under 20 Championship and scored in pool stage fixtures against Italy and Australia. He scored two tries in the final as England defeated Ireland to become champions.

After impressive performances at junior level, Marchant earned a call-up by coach Eddie Jones to the senior England training squad on 1 August 2016 and the following month saw him subsequently named in the Test squad for the Autumn Internationals. On 20 April 2017, Marchant was one of 15 uncapped players named in the senior squad for their summer tour of Argentina but ultimately withdrew prior to the trip due to injury.

On 11 August 2019 Marchant made his Test debut as a second-half replacement for Jonathan Joseph in a World Cup warm-up match against Wales. The following month saw him score his first try on his first start in their final warm-up fixture against Italy at St James' Park. He was not selected for the 2019 Rugby World Cup.

After the World Cup Marchant gained another cap when he featured against Georgia in their opening fixture of the 2020 Autumn Nations Cup. He was an unused substitute in the final of the competition as England defeated France after extra time to win the tournament.

Marchant was named in England's squad for the 2023 Rugby World Cup by coach Steve Borthwick. He scored a try during their quarter-final victory against Fiji. Marchant started in the semi-final elimination against champions South Africa and also played in their last game of the tournament which saw England defeat Argentina to finish third with the Bronze medal.

=== List of international tries ===
as of 15 October 2023

No.	Date	Venue	Opponent	Score	Result	Competition	Ref.
1	6 September 2019	St James' Park, Newcastle upon Tyne, England	Italy	21–0	37–0	2019 Rugby World Cup warm-up matches	
2	26 August 2023	Twickenham Stadium, London, England	Fiji	20–23	22–30	2023 Rugby World Cup warm-up matches	
3	17 September 2023	Stade de Nice, Nice, France	Japan	32–12	34–12	2023 Rugby World Cup	
4	15 October 2023	Stade Vélodrome, Marseille, France	Fiji	13–3	30–24	2023 Rugby World Cup	

== Honours ==
Harlequins

- PREM Rugby: 2020–2021
- Premiership Rugby Cup runner-up: 2019–2020

England

- Autumn Nations Cup: 2020
- Rugby World Cup third place: 2023

England U20

- World Rugby Junior World Championship: 2016
- Six Nations Under 20s Championship: 2015

== Personal life ==
In August 2026, Marchant married Hollie Shearer, the daughter of former England football captain Alan Shearer.
