= Richard Capstick =

English rugby union backrow

- Born: Richard Paul Capstick; 13 February 2000 (age 26) Taunton, Somerset, England
- Height: 6 ft 5 in (1.96 m)
- Weight: 17 st 7 lb (111 kg)
- University: University of Exeter

Rugby union career
- Position: Back row
- Current team: Exeter Chiefs
Senior career
Years	Team	Apps	(Points)
2018–	Exeter Chiefs	88	(40)
- Correct as of 31 March 2025
International career
Years	Team	Apps	(Points)
2017–2018	England U18	8	(0)
2019–2020	England U20	12	(10)
2025–	England A	1	(0)
- Correct as of 23 February 2025

Richard Paul Capstick (born 13 February 2000) is an English professional rugby union player who plays as a backrow for Premiership Rugby club Exeter Chiefs.

== Career ==
Capstick began playing rugby in his native Somerset for Taunton and local school Heathfield Community School. He joined Exeter Chiefs academy at 14 and played for England's under 18s at the age of sixteen. Capstick was a member of the England under-20 squad that finished fifth at the 2019 World Rugby Under 20 Championship.

Capstick made his debut for Exeter's first team as an 18-year-old, against Bath in the 2018–19 Premiership Rugby Cup. He became Exeter Chiefs youngest ever try scorer when he scored his first Premiership try at the age of 19. He was the first Premiership forward born in the 21st century. Capstick started the 2020–21 Premiership Rugby final which Exeter lost against Harlequins to finish league runners up.

In February 2025 Capstick played for England A in a victory over Ireland Wolfhounds. The following month saw him feature for Exeter in the 2024–25 Premiership Rugby Cup final which they lost against Bath to finish runners up.

In May 2025 Capstick was called up to a training camp for the senior England squad by Steve Borthwick.
