= Ben Bamber =

English rugby union player

- Born: 24 January 2001 (age 25) Trafford, England
- Height: 207 cm (6 ft 9 in)
- Weight: 134 kg (21 st 1 lb)

Rugby union career
- Position: Lock
- Current team: Sale Sharks
Youth career
- 2017–2019: Huddersfield Giants
Senior career
Years	Team	Apps	(Points)
2020–2022	Bristol Bears	-	(-)
2021–2022	→ Dings Crusaders (loan)	2	(0)
2022–	Sale Sharks	20	(5)
2022–2023	→ Sale FC (loan)	16	(5)
- Correct as of 4 March 2024
International career
Years	Team	Apps	(Points)
2024	England A	1	(0)
- Correct as of 4 March 2024

Ben Bamber (born 24 January 2001) is an English professional rugby union player who plays as a Lock for Premiership Rugby club Sale Sharks.

== Career ==
Bamber initially played rugby league and was on the books of his boyhood club, Huddersfield Giants in 2018. He was spotted by scout Alan Tait who recommended him to Pat Lam at Bristol Bears and although initially reluctant to change codes to rugby union he did eventually sign. In June 2020, he was promoted to train with the senior Bristol Bears squad. In 2021, he signed a dual-registration contract to allow him to play on loan at Dings Crusaders in Lockleaze. However, he injured his shoulder and despite recovering, quickly injured the other shoulder at an England U20 training session and demoralised, briefly quit the game. He worked, amongst other things, as a shelf-stacker in Flixton, Greater Manchester.

After a trial with Sale Sharks in March 2022, Bamber signed a full-time contract with the club. He made his debut for Sale that season in the Premiership Rugby Cup. During the 2022–23 season he played on loan at Sale FC Rugby Club in National League 1 where he impressed, being awarded the Supporters’ Player of the Year. In February 2023, he signed a new contract with Sale Sharks. In December 2023, he made his first European Champions Cup start for Sale Sharks against Stade Français. Bamber was named as the RPA 15 Under 23 MVP of the month for April.

== International career ==
On 1 January 2021, Bamber was called up to the England U20 squad although he did not make an appearance due to a shoulder injury. In February 2024 he played for the England A side against Portugal. He was selected for the England A squad again in November 2025.
