= George McGuigan =

English rugby union player (born 1993)

George Patrick McGuigan
- Born: George Patrick McGuigan; 30 March 1993 (age 33) Northallerton, North Yorkshire, England
- Height: 1.83 m (6 ft 0 in)
- Weight: 113 kg (17 st 11 lb)
- School: Gosforth Academy

Rugby union career
- Position: Hooker
- Current team: Newcastle Red Bulls
Amateur team(s)
Years	Team	Apps	(Points)
2003–2009	Darlington Mowden Park		
Senior career
Years	Team	Apps	(Points)
2011–2016	Newcastle Falcons	69	(25)
2016–2018	Leicester Tigers	34	(5)
2018–2022	Newcastle Falcons	83	(160)
2022–2025	Gloucester	26	(35)
2025	Ospreys	2	(0)
2025–	Newcastle Red Bulls	1	(5)
- Correct as of 20 March 2025
International career
Years	Team	Apps	(Points)
2010–2012	Ireland U18s	12	(5)
2013	Ireland U20s	9	(0)
2016	England Saxons	2	(0)
- Correct as of 19 May 2019

George Patrick McGuigan (born 30 March 1993) is an English rugby union player who plays for Newcastle Red Bulls in Premiership Rugby. His position is Hooker and has represented England Saxons as well as Ireland U18s, U20s on several occasions. Between 2016 and 2018 he played 35 times for Leicester Tigers.

== Club career ==
McGuigan was born in Richmond, North Yorkshire and first played rugby for Richmond' High School, before moving to Newcastle to further continue his rugby career at Gosforth Academy. McGuigan was part of the Newcastle Falcons academy scheme which saw several Falcons academy players link up with the school to continue their studies and academy training during post-16.

He became a member of the first team squad after joining the club professionally in 2011. On 4 February 2014, McGuigan signed a two-year contract extension with Newcastle until the summer of 2016. In February 2016, McGuigan signed a contract to join Leicester Tigers from the 2016–17 season.

On 21 April 2018, McGuigan re-signed with his hometown club Newcastle Falcons from the 2018–19 season.

On 12 December 2022, McGuigan left Newcastle with immediate effect to join Premiership rivals Gloucester on a long-term deal. On 17 March 2024, McGuigan suffered a severe injury to his hamstring during the Premiership Rugby Cup final against Leicester Tigers.

On 20 March 2025, McGuigan departed Gloucester by mutual consent. Later that day, it was confirmed he joined Ospreys on a short-term contract.

On 31 July 2025, McGuigan returns to his old club Newcastle Red Bulls for a third time in the Premiership for the 2025-26 season.

== International career ==
=== Ireland U18 ===
After successfully completing trials in 2010 McGuigan was selected to represent the Ireland U18 squad.

=== Ireland U20 ===
On 1 February 2013 McGuigan made his debut against Wales, creating several try-scoring opportunities as well as injuring himself in the process, only to carry on and make a match saving tackle in his own final third.

=== England Saxons ===
McGuigan was called up by England Saxons for their 2016 tour to South Africa where he played two matches from the bench.

=== England ===
In June 2022 he was called up by Eddie Jones to join a training camp with the senior England squad.
