= Billy Millard =

Australian rugby union coach

- Born: 1 January 1970 (age 56) Australia

Rugby union career
Coaching career
- Years: Team
- 2006—2008: Melbourne Rebels
- 2009—2011: Cardiff Blues (Assistant Coach)
- 2011—2013: Connacht Rugby (Assistant Coach)
- 2013—2015: United States
- 2015—2017: Cardiff Blues
- 2018—2023: Harlequins (Director of Rugby Performance)
- 2023–2025: Harlequins (Director of Rugby)

Billy Millard is an Australian rugby union coach and former Director of Rugby with Harlequins.

== Coaching career ==
=== Harlequins (2018—2025) ===
He has been involved with Harlequins since 2018 having joined the club as Director of Rugby Performance. This responsibility involves overseeing all performance aspects side of the club including the men's, women's and academy sides.

Following the departure of Paul Gustard midway through the 2020-21 Premiership Rugby season, Millard was tasked with overseeing club coaches Jerry Flannery, Nick Evans and Adam Jones. That same year, the quartet of coaches went on to win the English Premiership title, beating Exeter Chiefs 40–38 in the highest scoring Premiership final ever at the time and the first time Harlequins had won the title since 2012.

In summer 2023, his role at the club was changed to Director of Rugby. In April 2024, he oversaw Harlequins first ever knockout stage victory in the Champions Cup beating Glasgow Warriors 28-24 in the Round of 16. The following week, he oversaw their quarter final victory in the competition, beating Bordeaux Bègles 42-41 away to reach the semi finals of the competition for the first time in Harlequins history.

In March 2025, he announced he would be leaving the club at the end of the season.

== Honours ==
1999 Burnside RUFC Premiership Title, 2005 Sydney University FC NSW Premiership Title, 2006 Sydney University FC NSW Premiership Title, 2007 Melbourne Rebels Runners Up ARC, 2009 Cardiff Blues EDF Championship, 2010 Cardiff Blues Challenge Cup Championship, 2021 Harlequins FC English Premiership Winners
