= Albert Tuisue =

Fijian rugby union player

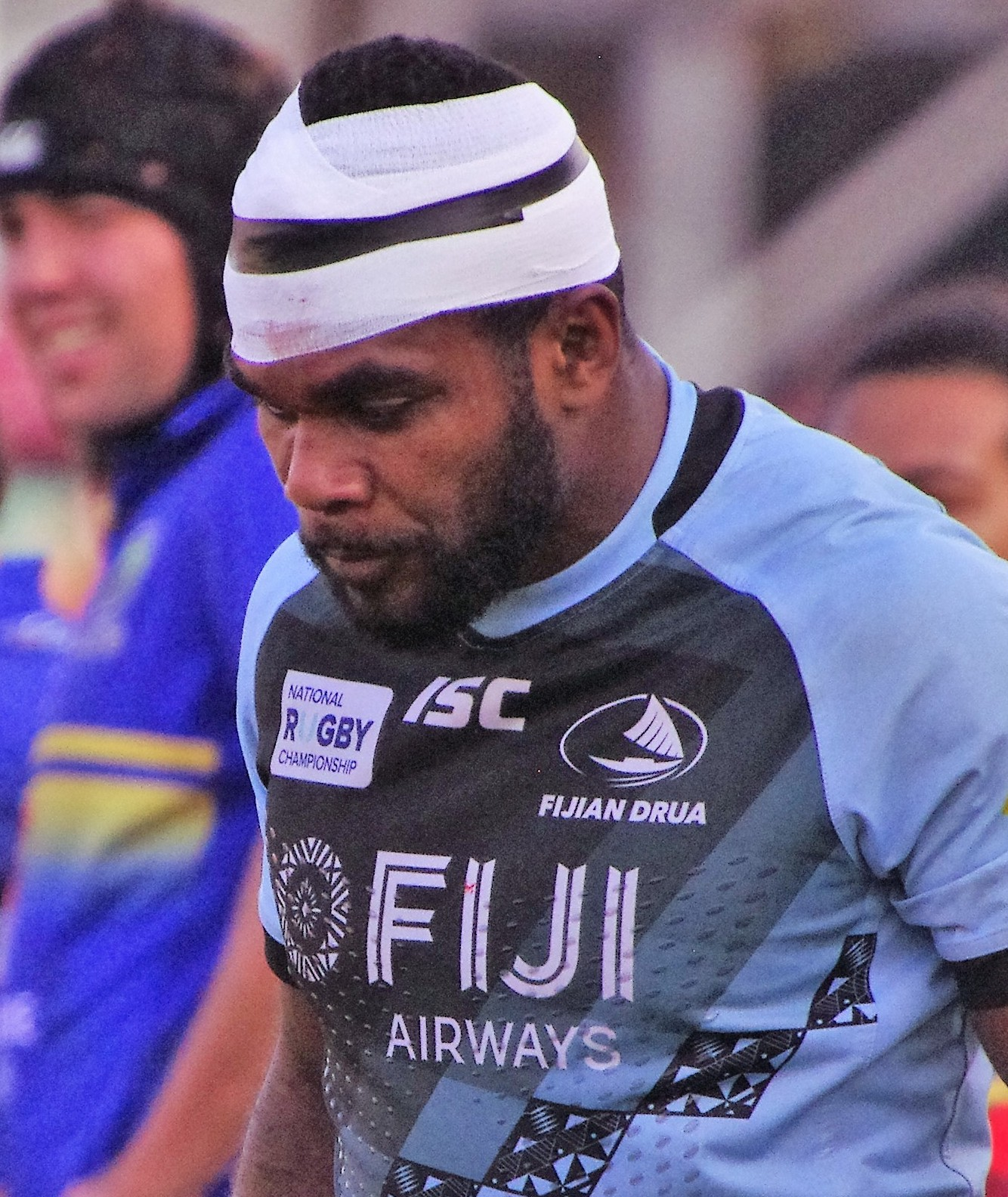
- Tuisue in 2018
- Born: Albert Tuisue; 6 June 1993 (age 33) Kadavu Island, Fiji
- Height: 1.88 m (6 ft 2 in)
- Weight: 114 kg (17 st 13 lb; 251 lb)

Rugby union career
- Position(s): Lock, Back row
- Current team: Gloucester
Amateur team(s)
Years	Team	Apps	(Points)
2017-2018	West Harbour	28	(15)
2017	Greater Sydney Rams	8	(10)
Senior career
Years	Team	Apps	(Points)
2018	Fijian Drua	9	(20)
2018-2022	London Irish	73	(130)
2022-2025	Gloucester	45	(45)
2025–	Provence	0	(0)
- Correct as of 17 June 2025
International career
Years	Team	Apps	(Points)
2018-	Fiji	33	(15)
- Correct as of 17 June 2022

Albert Tuisue (born 6 June 1993) is a Fijian professional rugby union player who currently plays for Provence in the Pro D2. He plays as lock or back row. He is known for his aggression on the field.

== Background ==
Tuisue gave up his career as a police officer in Fiji in order to pursue a career in rugby.

== Playing career ==
He played in the Shute Shield and the NRC before joining Fijian Drua making his Fiji debut in 2018. He won the 2018 NRC championship with Drua. In the final at Churchill Park, Lautoka against Queensland Country he was Man of the Match.

Tuisue signed for London Irish in 2019. He became a regular in the London Irish side, making 24 appearances and scoring 8 tries in the 2019/20 season. He made his 50th appearance for the club against Exeter Chiefs in the 2020/21 Premiership season.

On 17 January 2022, Tuisue signed for Premiership rivals Gloucester ahead of the 2022–23 season.

On 2 July 2025, Tuisue would leave Gloucester to join French club Provence in the Pro D2 competition on an undisclosed length deal from the 2025–26 season.
