= Afolabi Fasogbon =

English rugby union player

- Fasogbon in 2026
- Born: Afolabi Fasogbon; 24 August 2004 (age 22) Surrey, England
- Height: 1.92 m (6 ft 4 in)
- Weight: 137 kg (21 st 8 lb)
- School: The Bishop Wand Church of England School

Rugby union career
- Position: Prop
- Current team: Gloucester
Amateur team(s)
Years	Team	Apps	(Points)
- Saracens Amateur RFC
Senior career
Years	Team	Apps	(Points)
2022–2023	London Irish	1	(0)
2023–	Gloucester	41	(10)
- Correct as of 4 Mar 2026
International career
Years	Team	Apps	(Points)
2023–2024	England U20	16	(5)
2024–	England A	4	(0)
- Correct as of 17 November 2024

Afolabi Fasogbon (born 24 August 2004) is an English professional rugby union player who plays as a prop forward for Premiership club Gloucester.

== Early life ==
Fasogbon's Nigerian parents grew up in Lagos before emigrating to England. He attended St Marys and St Johns COFE School in Barnet. He started playing rugby union at under-14 level, and joined the London Irish Academy at aged 15, having previously represented Saracens Amateur RFC.

== Club career ==
=== London Irish ===
Fasogbon signed on as a professional with London Irish ahead of the 2022–23 season. In September 2022 he made his debut for London Irish against Harlequins in the Premiership Rugby Cup.

=== Esher ===
Fasogbon also played for Esher in National League 1 on loan. On his first XV debut he scored a try against Cinderford at Molesey Road in October 2022.

=== Gloucester ===
After London Irish entered administration it was announced in June 2023 that Fasogbon had joined Gloucester. During his time at Gloucester, Fasogbon went on loan to Birmingham Moseley in National League One and on 17 February 2024 made his debut for them against Darlington Mowden Park amassing 1 appearance for the side.

He first gained media attention for his confident attitude when facing more experienced opposition, waving off England international Ellis Genge as he was being substituted in a fixture against Bristol Bears before shushing Northampton Saints prop Tom West after winning a penalty against him.

== International career ==
In August 2021 Fasogbon earned his only England U18 cap in a match against Italy U18. He represented England U20 during the 2023 Six Nations Under 20s Championship and on 10 February 2023 scored his only try at international youth level in a 35–25 victory over Italy. Later that year he was a member of the side that finished fourth at the 2023 World Rugby U20 Championship.

Fasogbon made his only appearance of the 2024 Six Nations Under 20s Championship against Scotland as England went on to win the competition. He was included in their squad for the 2024 World Rugby U20 Championship and started in the final as England defeated France at Cape Town Stadium to become junior world champions.

In November 2024 Fasogbon played for England A in a victory over Australia A. In May 2025, Fasogbon was called up to a training camp for the senior England squad by Steve Borthwick. He was selected for the England A squad again in November 2025.
