= Josh McNally =

England international rugby union player

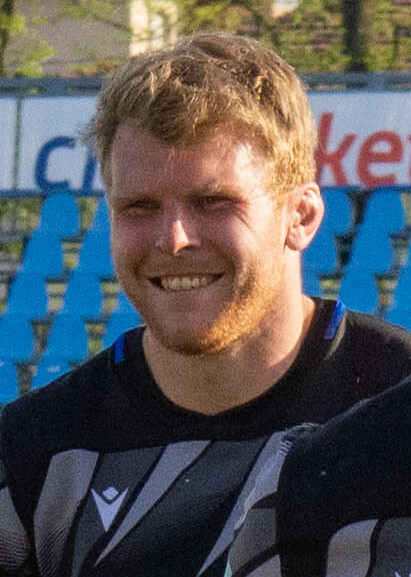
- Born: Joshua James McNally; 21 August 1990 (age 36) Ely, Cambridgeshire
- Height: 6 ft 7 in (201 cm)
- Weight: 19 st 13 lb (279 lb; 127 kg)

Rugby union career
- Position: Lock
- Current team: Bath
Senior career
Years	Team	Apps	(Points)
2012–2014	Henley Hawks	44	(10)
2014–2017	London Welsh	37	(35)
2017–2019	London Irish	44	(55)
2019-2024	Bath	82	(40)
2024–	Cardiff	0	(0)
- Correct as of 19 December 2023
International career
Years	Team	Apps	(Points)
-	RAF	-	(-)
2015	UK Armed Forces Rugby	2	(5)
2021	England	1	(0)
- Correct as of 19 December 2023

Joshua James McNally (born 21 August 1990) is an English rugby union lock. He is also a Royal Air Force weapons technician and has been in the RAF since 2009.

== Rugby career ==
McNally initially played rugby solely for the Royal Air Force, but in 2012 he was posted to RAF Brize Norton allowed to join Henley Hawks as part of the Royal Air Force Rugby Union Centre of Excellence Scheme. After impressing in a pre-season match McNally earned a move to Premiership Rugby side London Welsh in June 2014.

In January 2017, after relegation to the RFU Championship in the summer of 2017, McNally was released by London Welsh to allow him to join London Irish with immediate effect. In January 2019 Bath announced that McNally would join them in the summer of 2019.

On 4 July 2024, after announcing his departure from Bath, McNally has signed for Welsh region Cardiff in the United Rugby Championship from the 2024-25 season.

== Personal life ==
In December 2017 McNally underwent heart surgery to correct a case of Patent foramen ovale, and was later described as having suffered a stroke.
