= Zack Henry =

English rugby union player

- Born: Zack Anthony Henry; 1 October 1994 (age 32) Brighton
- Height: 6 ft (183 cm)
- Weight: 90 kg (198 lb)
- University: University of Bath
- Occupation: Professional Rugby Player

Rugby union career
- Position: Fly-half
- Current team: Stade Français Paris
Senior career
Years	Team	Apps	(Points)
2016–2018	Rouen	39	(261)
2018–2020	Nevers	40	(335)
2020–2021	Leicester Tigers	31	(151)
2021–2023	Pau	37	(281)
2023–2026	Stade Français Paris	41	(289)
2026–	Newcastle Red Bulls	0	(0)
2016–	Total	173	(1325)
- Correct as of 17 June 2021
National sevens team
Years	Team		Comps
	GB 7s		Universiade

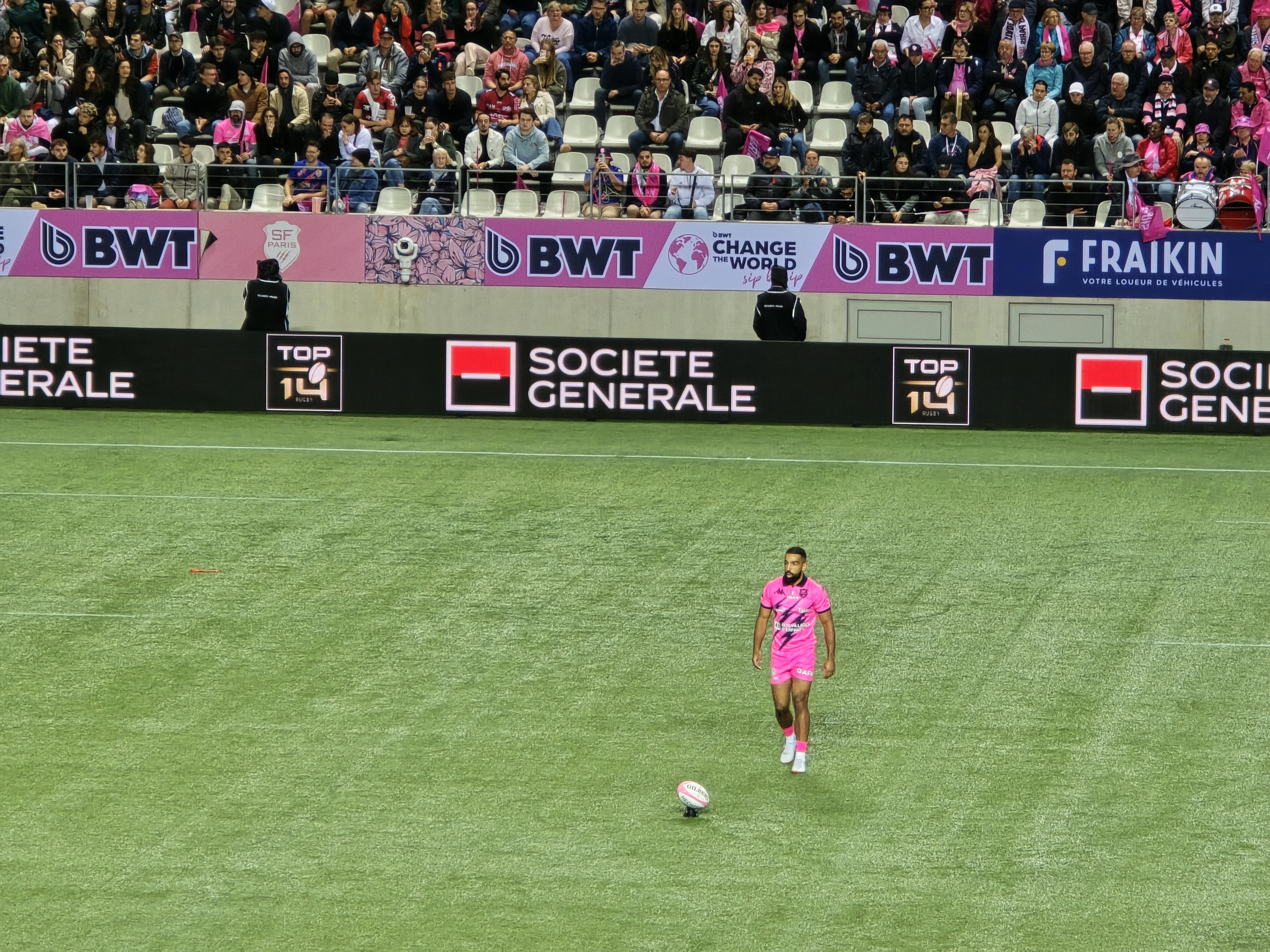

Zack Henry (born 1 October 1994) is an English professional rugby player currently playing for Newcastle Red Bulls in Englands's Prem, he has previously played for Section Paloise and Leicester Tigers in Premiership Rugby. His position is Fly-half, he also plays at fullback.

== Career ==
Henry played for the University of Bath and was selected for Team GB in the World University 7s Championships in which he claimed a silver medal, losing to Australia in the final. After his three years at the University of Bath, he gained a Masters Degree at University of the West of England, Bristol

Henry spent four seasons in France and made a name for himself with coach Richard Hill at French side Rouen in Fédérale 1 for the 2016–17 and 2017-18 seasons before being picked up by Pro D2 side Nevers and was since recognised as one of the top performers in the Pro D2.

On 25 February 2020, it was announced Zack returns to his home nation in England to join Leicester Tigers in the Premiership Rugby from the 2020-21 season. Henry made his Leicester debut on 15 August 2021 as a replacement against Exeter, and played 26 times for Leicester in his single year at the club.

On 9 June 2021, it was announced that Henry would return to France to join Top 14 side Pau ahead of the 2021-22 season. making him one of two players in history, and the first English player to compete in Fédérale 1, Pro D2, English Premiership and the Top 14.

After two seasons with Pau, Henry signed three years with Stade Français Paris in Paris. On 29 January 2026, Henry returns to England to join Newcastle Red Bulls back in the English Premiership for the 2026-27 season.

== Personal life ==
Jake Henry, the brother of Zack, also plays professional rugby in the English RFU Championship.
