= Sam Bedlow =

English rugby union player

- Full name: Samuel Bedlow
- Born: 8 August 1995 (age 31) Bury, England
- Height: 1.83 m (6 ft 0 in)
- Weight: 93 kg (14 st 9 lb; 205 lb)
- School: Haslingden High School
- University: Myerscough College

Rugby union career
- Position: Centre
Youth career
- 2013–2017: Sale Jets
- 2015: Eastern Province U21
Amateur team(s)
Years	Team	Apps	(Points)
2012–2013	Rossendale		
Senior career
Years	Team	Apps	(Points)
2013–2017	Sale Sharks	8	(5)
2013–2014	→ Preston Grasshoppers	4	(0)
2014–2017	→ Fylde	23	(28)
2017–2023	Bristol Bears	58	(0)
2023–	Sale Sharks	0	(0)
- Correct as of 7 June 2019

Samuel Bedlow (born 8 August 1995 in Bury, England) is a rugby union player who most recently played for the Bristol Bears. His regular position is centre.

== Career ==
=== Early life ===
At youth level, Bedlow represented Sale Sharks at Under-18, Under-19 and A level and also played for National League 3 North side Rossendale.

=== Sale Sharks ===
Bedlow signed a professional contract with Sale Sharks prior to the 2013–2014 season, where he mostly played for their academy side, the Sale Jets.

He didn't make any appearances for them during the 2013–2014 season, but he did join National League 2 North side Preston Grasshoppers where he made four appearances.

During the 2014–15 season, Bedlow joined National League 1 side Fylde on a dual registration basis and made nine appearances for the side, scoring a try on his debut for Fylde in a 29–29 draw against Darlington Mowden Park. He made his first class debut for Sale Sharks on 1 February 2015 in their 2014–15 LV Cup match against Newcastle Falcons, starting in a 19–39 defeat.

In July 2015, Bedlow had a spell with South African side the Eastern Province Kings, representing their Under-21 side in the 2015 Under-21 Provincial Championship.

=== Bristol Bears ===
On 2 May 2017, it was confirmed that Bedlow signs for Premiership rivals Bristol Bears ahead of the 2017-18 season. He has made 58 first-team appearances during his five seasons with the club.

=== Return to Sale Sharks ===
On 27 February 2023, it was confirmed that Bedlow would return to his old club Sale Sharks on a long-term deal ahead of the 2023-24 season.
