= George Kloska =

English rugby union player

- Full name: George Kloska
- Born: 16 November 1999 (age 26) Bristol, England
- Height: 183 cm (6 ft 0 in)
- Weight: 117 kg (258 lb; 18 st 6 lb)
- School: SGS Filton

Rugby union career
- Position(s): Tight-head Prop, Hooker
- Current team: Bristol Bears
Youth career
- 2012–2018: Bristol Bears
Senior career
Years	Team	Apps	(Points)
2018–	Bristol Bears	86	(30)
2018–2019	→ Old Redcliffians (loan)	19	(0)
2019–2022	→ Dings Crusaders RFC (loan)	12	(15)
2022	→ Bedford Blues (loan)	1	(0)
2022	→ Hartpury College (loan)	4	(0)
- Correct as of 19 July 2026
International career
Years	Team	Apps	(Points)
2025–	England A	3	(5)
2026–	England	2	(0)
- Correct as of 19 July 2026

George Kloska (born 16 November 1999) is an English professional rugby union player who plays as a prop for PREM Rugby club Bristol Bears.

== Career ==
Kloska joined the Bristol academy at the age of 13 and made his club debut against Leinster 'A' in the 2017–18 British and Irish Cup. He joined the Senior Academy in 2019 making his league debut for the senior side coming off the bench against Newcastle Falcons on the final day of the 2018–19 Premiership Rugby season.

On New Year's Day 2021, Kloska made his first League start against Newcastle again, where he scored a try and was named Man of the Match. He has spent time on loan at Old Redcliffians, Dings Crusaders, Bedford Blues, Hartpury College. In December 2022 he extended his contract with Bristol.

In February 2025 Kloska started for England A in a victory over Ireland Wolfhounds. Later that year in June 2025 he was called up to a training camp for the senior England squad by coach Steve Borthwick.

Kloska was included in the senior England squad for the inaugural 2026 Nations Championship. On 11 July 2026, he made his Test debut as a substitute against Fiji at Hill Dickinson Stadium.
