= Jack Kenningham =

English rugby union player (born 1999)

- Born: Jack David Kenningham; 19 November 1999 (age 26) Kingston upon Thames, England
- Height: 1.91 m (6 ft 3 in)
- Weight: 107 kg (16 st 12 lb)
- School: Reed's School

Rugby union career
- Position: Flanker
- Current team: Harlequins
Senior career
Years	Team	Apps	(Points)
2018–	Harlequins	65	(30)
- Correct as of 12 February 2025
International career
Years	Team	Apps	(Points)
2025–	England A	1	(0)
- Correct as of 26 February 2025

Jack Kenningham (born 19 November 1999) is an English professional rugby union player who plays as a flanker for Premiership Rugby club Harlequins.

== Early life ==
Kenningham grew up in Twickenham, and attended Unicorn Primary School. At Reed's, he was a dual sportsman, playing in the first team for cricket as an opening bowler, as well as playing rugby. His father, David Kenningham, played rugby for Saracens and Richmond during his career.

== Club career ==
Kenningham came through the Harlequins academy. In February 2021 he made his club debut in a league game against Newcastle Falcons. At the end of that season on 26 June 2021, Kenningham started in the league final against Exeter Chiefs as Harlequins won the game 40-38 in the highest scoring Premiership final ever.

== International career ==
Kenningham was called up to the senior England squad in September 2021 for a training camp.

In February 2025 Kenningham started for the England A side in a victory against Ireland Wolfhounds at Ashton Gate.
