= Charlie Atkinson (rugby union) =

English rugby union player (born 2001)

- Born: Charles Joseph Atkinson; 6 October 2001 (age 25) Oxford, England
- Height: 6 ft 0 in (1.83 m)
- Weight: 88 kg (13 st 12 lb; 194 lb)
- School: Abingdon School

Rugby union career
- Position: Fly-half
- Current team: Gloucester Rugby
Senior career
Years	Team	Apps	(Points)
2020–2022	Wasps	40	(52)
2022–2023	Leicester Tigers	24	(69)
2023–	Gloucester	53	(87)
- Correct as of 17 April 2026
International career
Years	Team	Apps	(Points)
2019	England U18	2	(5)
2021	England U20	4	(0)
2024–	England A	7	(33)
2025–	England	1	(2)
- Correct as of 8 February 2026

Charles Joseph Atkinson (born 6 October 2001) is an English professional rugby union player who plays as a fly-half for Gallagher Premiership club Gloucester Rugby.

== Early life and education ==
Atkinson's father played rugby for Tynedale RFC, Northumberland and had England Under-18 trials.

Atkinson first played rugby at Oxford RFC, aged five. He was educated at Abingdon School from 2013 until 2020 and played in the first XV rugby team. Atkinson played twice for England U-18.

== Club career ==
In 2020 Atkinson signed for Wasps on a three-year contract. He is known for beating defenders, try scoring, and also for physical commitment in defence. Atkinson started in their 2021–22 EPCR Challenge Cup semi-final elimination against Lyon.

Following Wasps administration in October 2022, Atkinson signed a long-term contract with Leicester Tigers on 31 October 2022. He made his debut as a replacement in Tigers' one point defeat away to Bath on 11 November 2022.

After making 24 appearances for Leicester, Atkinson moved to Gloucester on Christmas Eve 2023. He made his Gloucester debut on 28 January 2024, scoring a try in the 32–20 victory over Sale Sharks. During his first campaign with the club, Atkinson played as a substitute in their semi-final victory over Benetton Rugby but did not feature in the 2023–24 EPCR Challenge Cup final which they lost against Sharks to finish runners up.

In January 2025, Atkinson signed a new contract extension with Gloucester. On 30 September 2026, Atkinson signed another contract extension to stay at Gloucester until the summer of 2029.

== International career ==
On 1 January 2021 Atkinson was selected for the England Under-20 Squad and on 26 January 2021 it was announced that he would be part of the shadow senior squad for England during the 2021 Six Nations Championship. Later that year he was a member of the junior side that completed a grand slam during the 2021 Six Nations Under 20s Championship.

In June 2022 Atkinson was called up by coach Eddie Jones to join a training camp with the senior England squad. In February 2024 Atkinson started for England A scoring four points in a victory over Portugal.

Atkinson was included in the squad for the 2025 England rugby union tour of Argentina and the United States. On 19 July 2025, Atkinson got his first England cap, making his international debut from off the bench as a replacement for George Ford in a 40–5 victory against USA at Audi Field in Washington, D.C. to finish their summer tour.

== See also ==
- List of Old Abingdonians
