= Adam Radwan =

English rugby union player

- Born: Adam Belal A. Radwan; 30 December 1997 (age 28) Osmotherley, North Yorkshire, England
- Height: 1.79 m (5 ft 10 in)
- Weight: 86 kg (13 st 8 lb)
- School: Hartlepool Sixth Form College

Rugby union career
- Position: Winger
- Current team: Leicester Tigers
Senior career
Years	Team	Apps	(Points)
2016–2025	Newcastle Falcons	128	(295)
2016–2018	→ Darlington Mowden Park (loan)	34	(110)
2025–	Leicester Tigers	41	(135)
- Correct as of 7 November 2026
International career
Years	Team	Apps	(Points)
2021	England	2	(20)
- Correct as of 16 November 2021

Adam Radwan (born 30 December 1997) is an English professional rugby union player who plays as a winger for Leicester Tigers in Premiership Rugby.

== Early career ==
In his early rugby days Adam Radwan played for Middlesbrough R.U.F.C.. Due to Billingham R.U.F.C. being in a higher league, he decided to transfer there. He re-joined the Falcons' senior academy in the summer of 2017 after a string of impressive performances for the A-Team and in the Premiership 7s. The former Billingham RUFC, Middlesbrough RUFC and Hartlepool Sixth Form College man is renowned for his pace and finishing ability. He is of Egyptian ancestry.

== Club career ==
A star for the Falcons in the 2016 Singha 7s, Radwan spent the latter part of the 2016-17 season with National League 1 side Darlington Mowden Park, having made his Falcons first team debut in the Anglo-Welsh Cup trip to Saracens. Radwan's progress continued during the 2017-18 campaign, during which he won the Anglo-Welsh Cup Breakthrough Player Award. His pace and evasive running saw him as the top try-scorer during the European Rugby Challenge Cup, including back-to-back hat-tricks against Enisei-STM. Radwan made his Premiership debut during 2017-18, capping off a memorable year by winning Falcons' Academy Player of the Season and helping the Falcons to the final of the World Club 10s in Mauritius. During 2018-19 Radwan scored his first Premiership try during an away game at Bristol Bears, and also scored his first Heineken Champions Cup try away to Edinburgh. Helping the Falcons to promotion from the RFU Championship during the 2019-20 campaign with a string of eye-catching tries, he continued his progression with seven tries in 11 games during the 2020-21 season, earning a call-up for England's 2021 summer internationals.

On 29 November 2024, he scored a try off the bench for only a second win of the season for the club and their first win over Saracens since 2009.

In January 2025, he joined Leicester Tigers with immediate effect. He signed on a multi-year deal with Newcastle Falcons being compensated given the transfer took place mid-season. He scored a try on his debut with his first touch of the ball in defeat against Gloucester.

== International career ==
On 10 July 2021 Radwan made his full England debut and scored a hat-trick of tries in a 70-14 victory against Canada at Twickenham.

On 18 October 2021 he was named in England's squad for the 2021 Autumn Nations Series. Radwan started on the wing in England's first game of the series against Tonga, scoring a try in the third minute as part of England's 69-3 win.

=== International tries ===
As of 16 November 2021

Try	Opposing team	Location	Venue	Competition	Date	Result	Score
1	Canada	London, England	Twickenham Stadium	2021 July rugby union tests	20 July 2021	Win	70 – 14
2	Canada	London, England	Twickenham Stadium	2021 July rugby union tests	20 July 2021	Win	70 – 14
3	Canada	London, England	Twickenham Stadium	2021 July rugby union tests	20 July 2021	Win	70 – 14
4	Tonga	London, England	Twickenham Stadium	2021 Autumn Nations Series	6 November 2021	Win	69 – 3
