= Rugby Players' Association =

English trade union

RPA
- Rugby Players' Association
- Formation: 1998; 28 years ago
- Location: England
- Members: 618 (2025)
- General Secretary: Christian Day
- Website: therpa.co.uk

The Rugby Players' Association (RPA) is a trade union representing elite rugby rugby union players in England. The RPA is the representative body and collective voice of elite rugby players in England and represents more than 1000 members across current and former players in the elite men's and women's games.

== Overview ==
RPA members qualify for a wide range of benefits, including: independent representation; legal advice; personal and professional development; playing insurance; education; confidential counselling; transition support; and more. Members can also access the support of a charity, Restart, in the event of serious illness, injury or hardship.

The RPA was founded by professional player Damian Hopley, who was forced to early retirement after an injury.

In August 2022, the RPA announced that Hopley was to leave the organisation after 24 years in charge of the company.

On 16 January 2023, it was announced that Christian Day, was elected the new General Secretary of the RPA, following an election to the membership.

== RPA Men's Rugby Board ==
The following rugby union professionals playing in England make up the current RPA Men's Rugby Board, as of the 2026-27 season.

Role	Player	Team
Chair	(England) Max Lahiff	Bristol Bears
Vice-chair	(England) Ben Spencer	Bath Rugby
Board Member		
Board Member	(Scotland) Murray McCallum	Newcastle Red Bulls
Board Member	(England) Will Evans	Harlequins
Board Member	(England) Emmanuel Iyogun	Northampton Saints
Board Member	(England) Olamide Sodeke	Saracens
Board Member	(Scotland) Gus Warr	Sale Sharks
Board Member	(Italy) Ross Vintcent	Exeter Chiefs
Board Member	(England) Lewis Ludlow	Gloucester Rugby
Board Member	(England) Joe Heyes	Leicester Tigers

== RPA Women's Rugby Board ==
In June 2025, the RPA members voted in favour of a proposal to establish a Women's Rugby Board.

The following rugby union professionals playing in England make up the current RPA Women's Rugby Board, as of the 2026-27 season.

Role	Player	Team
Chair	(England) Abi Burton	Trailfinders
Vice-chair	(England) Grace Deane	Leicester
Board Member		
Board Member	(Ireland) Cliodhna Moloney-MacDonald	Exeter
Board Member	(Ireland) Sam Monaghan	Gloucester–Hartpury
Board Member	(England) Amelia Kolev	Harlequins
Board Member	(Wales) Jenny Hesketh	Bristol
Board Member	(Wales) Megan Davey	Loughborough
Board Member	(England) Tysh Harper	Sale
Board Member	(England) Ella Wyrwas	Saracens

== Awards ==
The following have been recognised at the annual RPA Awards, as voted on by professional rugby union players in England, since 2010:

Players' Player of the Year
Year	Player	Team	Ref
2010	(South Africa) Schalk Brits	Saracens	
2011	(England) Thomas Waldrom	Leicester	
2012	(New Zealand) Nick Evans	Harlequins	
2013	(England) Christian Wade	Wasps	
2014	(Fiji) Vereniki Goneva	Leicester	
2015	(England) Jonathan Joseph	Bath	
2016	(Australia) George Smith	Wasps	
2017	(New Zealand) Jimmy Gopperth	Wasps	
2018	(Tonga) Telusa Veainu	Leicester	
2019	(England) Danny Cipriani	Gloucester	
2020	(England) Jack Willis	Wasps	
2021	(England) Sam Simmonds	Exeter	
2022	(South Africa) André Esterhuizen	Harlequins	
2023	(South Africa) Jasper Wiese	Leicester	
2024	(England) Fin Smith	Northampton	

Young Player of the Year
Year	Player	Team	Ref
2010	(England) Ben Youngs	Leicester	
2011	(England) Manu Tuilagi	Leicester	
2012	(England) Owen Farrell	Saracens	
2013	(England) Christian Wade	Wasps	
2014	(England) George Ford	Bath	
2015	(England) Henry Slade	Exeter	
2016	(England) Maro Itoje	Saracens	
2017	(England) Zach Mercer	Bath	
2018	(England) Marcus Smith	Harlequins	
2019	(England) Ollie Thorley	Gloucester	
2020	(Wales) Louis Rees-Zammit	Gloucester	
2021	(England) Marcus Smith	Harlequins	
2022	(England) Freddie Steward	Leicester	
2023	(England) Tom Pearson	London Irish	
2024	(England) Immanuel Feyi-Waboso	Exeter	

England 15s Player of the Year
Year	Men	Women	Ref
2013	Joe Launchbury	Emily Scarratt	
2014	Mike Brown	Rachael Burford	
2015	Jonathan Joseph	Rocky Clark	
2016	Billy Vunipola	Sarah Hunter	
2017	Owen Farrell	Tamara Taylor	
2018	Mako Vunipola	Danielle Waterman	
2019	Jonny May	Sarah Bern	
2020	Tom Curry	Zoe Aldcroft	
2021	Tom Curry (2)	Poppy Cleall	
2022	Freddie Steward	Marlie Packer	
2023	Freddie Steward (2)	Sadia Kabeya	
2024	Ben Earl	Alex Matthews	

England 7s Player of the Year
Year	Men	Women	Ref
2012	Mathew Turner	Not awarded	
2013	Dan Norton	Not awarded	
2014	Tom Mitchell	Not awarded	
2015	Alex Gray	Not awarded	
2016	Dan Bibby	Not awarded	
2017	Richard de Carpentier	Not awarded	
2018	Ruaridh McConnochie	Alex Matthews	
2019	Will Muir	Alex Matthews (2)	
2020	Ben Harris	Megan Jones	

Special Merit Award (2010–15)
Year	Player	Team	Ref
2010	(England) Simon Shaw	Wasps	
2011	(England) Danny Grewcock	Bath	
2012	(England) Hugh Vyvyan	Saracens	
2013	(Ireland) Geordan Murphy	Leicester	
2014	(England) Steve Borthwick	Saracens	
2015	(England) Mark Cueto	Sale	

Special Merit Award (2016–21)
Year	Player	Team	Ref
2016	(England) Charlie Hodgson	Saracens	
2017	(England) Nick Easter	Harlequins	
2018	(Scotland) Ian Robertson	Not applicable	
2019	(England) Mathew Tait	Not applicable	
2020	(England) Richard Wigglesworth	Saracens	
2021	(England) Ben Youngs	Leicester	

Special Merit Award (2022–)
Year	Player	Team	Ref
2022	(England) Danny Care	Harlequins	
2023	(England) Dan Cole	Leicester	
2023	(England) Owen Farrell	Saracens	
2023	(England) Emily Scarratt	Loughborough (W)	
2024	(England) Marlie Packer	Saracens (W)	
2024	(England) Alex Waller	Northampton	

=== 15 Under 23 ===
The following teams represent the 15 Under 23, consisting of the top players in England aged 23 and under, as selected by voters, each year since 2022:

	2021–22		2022–23		2023–24		2024–25		2025-26	
No.	Player	Team	Player	Team	Player	Team	Player	Team	Player	Team
1.	(England) Bevan Rodd	Sale	(England) Bevan Rodd	Sale	(England) Fin Baxter	Harlequins	(England) Asher Opoku-Fordjour	Sale	(England) Fin Baxter	Harlequins
2.	(England) Nic Dolly	Leicester	(England) Theo Dan	Saracens	(England) Theo Dan	Saracens	(England) Theo Dan	Saracens	(England) Nathan Jibulu	Sale
3.	(England) Joe Heyes	Leicester	(England) Joe Heyes	Leicester	(England) Asher Opoku-Fordjour	Sale	(England) Afolabi Fasogbon	Gloucester	(England) Asher Opoku-Fordjour	Sale
4.	(England) Nick Isiekwe	Saracens	(England) George Martin	Leicester	(Wales) Dafydd Jenkins	Exeter	(Wales) Freddie Thomas	Gloucester	(England) Tom Burrow	Sale
5.	(England) Ollie Chessum	Leicester	(England) Hugh Tizard	Saracens	(England) Ollie Chessum	Leicester	(England) Arthur Clark	Gloucester	(England) Elliot Williams	Harlequins
6.	(England) Ben Earl	Saracens	(England) Ted Hill	Bath	(England) Chandler Cunningham-South	Harlequins	(England) Guy Pepper	Bath	(England) Guy Pepper	Bath
7.	(England) Tom Pearson	London Irish	(England) Tom Pearson	London Irish	(England) Guy Pepper	Newcastle	(England) Henry Pollock	Northampton	(England) Henry Pollock	Northampton
8.	(England) Fitz Harding	Bristol	(England) Fitz Harding	Bristol	(Italy) Ross Vintcent	Exeter	(England) Greg Fisilau	Exeter	(England) Greg Fisilau	Exeter
9.	(England) Harry Randall	Bristol	(Scotland) Gus Warr	Sale	(England) Jack van Poortvliet	Leicester	(England) Jack van Poortvliet	Leicester	(England) Archie McParland	Northampton
10.	(England) Marcus Smith	Harlequins	(England) Fin Smith	Northampton	(England) Fin Smith	Northampton	(England) Fin Smith	Northampton	(England) Fin Smith	Northampton
11.	(England) Ollie Hassell-Collins	London Irish	(England) Cadan Murley	Harlequins	(England) Immanuel Feyi-Waboso	Exeter	(England) Paul Brown-Bampoe	Exeter	(England) Noah Calouri	Saracens
12.	(England) Dan Kelly	Leicester	(England) Seb Atkinson	Gloucester	(England) Max Ojomoh	Bath	(England) Seb Atkinson	Gloucester	(England) Seb Atkinson	Gloucester
13.	(England) Fraser Dingwall	Northampton	(England) Ollie Lawrence	Bath	(England) Oscar Beard	Harlequins	(England) Oscar Beard	Harlequins	(England) Tom Litchfield	Northampton
14.	(Wales) Louis Rees-Zammit	Gloucester	(Argentina) Mateo Carreras	Newcastle	(England) Tommy Freeman	Northampton	(England) Immanuel Feyi-Waboso	Exeter	(England) Immanuel Feyi-Waboso	Exeter
15.	(England) Freddie Steward	Leicester	(England) Joe Carpenter	Sale	(England) Josh Hodge	Exeter	(England) Ciaran Donoghue	Bath	(England) Ben Redshaw	Gloucester

Since the 2023/24 season, the RPA have also voted for a Women's 15 Under 23 Team of the Season, from players from Premiership Women's Rugby.

	2023-24		2024–25		2025-26	
No.	Player	Team	Player	Team	Player	Team
1.	(England) Abby Middlebrooke	Exeter Chiefs	(England) Kelsey Clifford	Saracens	(England) Amelia Williams	Loughborough
2.	(England) Niamh Swailes	Sale	(England) Lucy Calladine	Loughborough	(England) Milly Hyndman	Sale
3.	(England) Kelsey Clifford	Saracens	(England) Maud Muir	Gloucester–Hartpury	(England) Nadine Vincent	Leicester
4.	(England) Delaney Burns	Bristol Bears	(England) Lilli Ives Campion	Loughborough	(England) Steph Else	Gloucester–Hartpury
5.	(England) Lilli Ives Campion	Loughborough	(Scotland) Eva Donaldson	Leicester	(England) Morwenna Talling	Sale
6.	(England) Maisy Allen	Exeter Chiefs	(England) Georgia Brock	Gloucester–Hartpury	(England) Haineala Lutui	Loughborough
7.	(England) Sadia Kabeya	Loughborough	(England) Maisy Allen	Exeter Chiefs	(England) Maisy Allen	Exeter Chiefs
8.	(Scotland) Evie Gallagher	Bristol Bears	(England) Maddie Feaunati	Exeter Chiefs	(England) Maddie Feaunati	Exeter Chiefs
9.	(England) Tori Sellors	Saracens	(England) Flo Robinson	Exeter Chiefs	(England) Tori Sellors	Saracens
10.	(Wales) Lleucu George	Gloucester–Hartpury	(England) Lizzie Duffy	Sale	(England) Lizzie Duffy	Sale
11.	(England) Reneeqa Bonner	Bristol Bears	(England) Mia Venner	Gloucester–Hartpury	(England) Reneeqa Bonner	Bristol Bears
12.	(England) Carmella Morrall	Loughborough	(Spain) Clàudia Peña	Harlequins	(England) Sarah Parry	Harlequins
13.	(England) Sophie Bridger	Saracens	(Scotland) Emma Orr	Bristol Bears	(Spain) Clàudia Peña	Harlequins
14.	(England) Katie Shillaker	Harlequins	(England) Millie David	Bristol Bears	(England) Millie David	Bristol Bears
15.	(England) Ellie Kildunne	Harlequins	(England) Emma Sing	Gloucester–Hartpury	(England) Mia Venner	Gloucester–Hartpury

== Hall of Fame ==
The following players, coaches, officials, administrators and commentators have been inducted into the RPA Hall of Fame:

Year	Inductee
1999	(Australia) Michael Lynagh
2000	(Wales) Cliff Morgan
2000	(England) Peter Winterbottom
2001	(Ireland) Willie John McBride
2001	(France) Philippe Sella
2002	(England) Dean Richards
2002	(Scotland) John Rutherford
2003	(Wales) Gerald Davies
2003	(Australia) Tim Horan
2003	(England) Peter Wheeler

Year	Inductee
2004	(New Zealand) Zinzan Brooke
2004	(Scotland) Gavin Hastings
2005	(Wales) Sir Gareth Edwards
2005	(New Zealand) Sean Fitzpatrick
2006	(England) David Duckham
2006	(Ireland) Mike Gibson
2006	(Scotland) Sir Ian McGeechan
2007	(England) Martin Johnson
2008	(England) Richard Hill
2008	(England) Jason Leonard

Year	Inductee
2009	(England) Fran Cotton
2009	(England) Jeremy Guscott
2010	(Scotland) Bill McLaren
2011	(England) Lawrence Dallaglio
2012	(England) Jason Robinson
2013	(Wales) Ieuan Evans
2014	(Wales) Jonathan Davies
2015	(England) Jonny Wilkinson
2016	(Ireland) Brian O'Driscoll
2017	(New Zealand) Dan Carter

Year	Inductee
2018	(England) Sir Clive Woodward
2020	(England) Sir Bill Beaumont
2021	(England) Rocky Clark
2021	(Wales) Alun Wyn Jones
2022	(England) Katy Daley-McLean
2023	(England) Sarah Hunter
2023	(Scotland) Doddie Weir
2024	(England) Courtney Lawes

== See also ==
- Rugby Union Players Association, Australian national association for players' interests formed in October 1995
- Rugby Players Ireland, Irish national association for players' interests formed in October 2001
- Welsh Rugby Players Association, Welsh national association for players' interests formed in 2003
