= 2025 England rugby union tour of Argentina and the United States =

- Date: 5–19 July 2025
- Coach: Steve Borthwick
- Tour captain: George Ford
- Top point scorer: George Ford
- Top try scorer: Four players tied
- Top test point scorer: 30
- Top test try scorer: 2
Summary
| P | W | D | L |
Total
| 3 | 3 | 0 | 0 |
Test match
| 3 | 3 | 0 | 0 |
Opponent
| P | W | D | L |
Argentina
| 2 | 2 | 0 | 0 |
United States
| 1 | 1 | 0 | 0 |

Tour chronology
- ← New Zealand 2024

In July 2025, the England national rugby union team toured Argentina as part of the 2025 mid-year rugby union tests. The tour consisted of a two-test series against Argentina, followed by a third test against the United States. It was the seventh test series contested between England and Argentina, and the first since 2017, when England won the series 2–0. England prepared for the test series with a warm-up match against a France XV side on 21 June 2025.

== Fixtures ==
| Date | Venue | Home | Score | Away |
|---|---|---|---|---|
| 5 July 2025 | Estadio Jorge Luis Hirschi, La Plata | Argentina | 12–35 | England |
| 12 July 2025 | Estadio Bicentenario, San Juan | Argentina | 17–22 | England |
| 19 July 2025 | Audi Field, Washington, D.C. | United States | 5–40 | England |

== Matches ==
=== Argentina vs England (first test) ===
5 July 2025
16:40 ART (UTC-03)

| Argentina | 12–35 | England |
| Try: Matera 52' m Rubiolo 61' c Con: Carreras (1/2) 62' | Report | Try: Roebuck (2) 42' m, 49' c Steward 46' c Murley 75' c Con: Ford (3/4) 47', 50', 76'; Pen: Ford (2/2) 65', 69'; Drop: Ford (1/1) 20' |

Estadio Jorge Luis Hirschi, La Plata
Attendance: 32,000
Referee: Angus Gardner (Australia)

Argentina
England

| FB | 15 | Benjamín Elizalde | (substituted off) 62' |
| RW | 14 | Rodrigo Isgró |
| OC | 13 | Lucio Cinti |
| IC | 12 | Justo Piccardo |
| LW | 11 | Santiago Cordero | (substituted off) 63' |
| FH | 10 | Santiago Carreras |
| SH | 9 | Gonzalo Bertranou | (substituted off) 50' |
| N8 | 8 | Facundo Isa | (substituted off) 50' |
| OF | 7 | Juan Martín González |
| BF | 6 | Pablo Matera |
| RL | 5 | Pedro Rubiolo |
| LL | 4 | Lucas Paulos | (substituted off) 54' |
| TP | 3 | Pedro Delgado | (substituted off) 46' |
| HK | 2 | Julián Montoya (c) | (substituted off) 72' |
| LP | 1 | Mayco Vivas | (substituted off) 46' |
Substitutions:
| HK | 16 | Bautista Bernasconi | (substituted on) 72' |
| PR | 17 | Thomas Gallo | (substituted on) 46' |
| PR | 18 | Francisco Coria Marchetti | (substituted on) 46' |
| FL | 19 | Santiago Grondona | (substituted on) 54' |
| FL | 20 | Joaquín Moro | (substituted on) 50' |
| SH | 21 | Simón Benítez Cruz | (substituted on) 50' |
| FH | 22 | Nicolas Roger | (substituted on) 62' |
| CE | 23 | Matías Moroni | (substituted on) 63' |
Coach:
(Argentina) Felipe Contepomi

| FB | 15 | Freddie Steward |
| RW | 14 | Tom Roebuck | | (substituted off) 62' |
| OC | 13 | Henry Slade |
| IC | 12 | Seb Atkinson | (yellow card) 22' | (substituted off) 62' |
| LW | 11 | Will Muir |
| FH | 10 | George Ford (cc) |
| SH | 9 | Ben Spencer | | (substituted off) 57' |
| N8 | 8 | Tom Willis | | (substituted off) 62' |
| OF | 7 | Sam Underhill | | (substituted off) 62' |
| BF | 6 | Ben Curry |
| RL | 5 | Alex Coles | (yellow card) 15' |
| LL | 4 | Charlie Ewels | | (substituted off) 50' | (substituted on) 64' |
| TP | 3 | Joe Heyes | | (substituted off) 57' |
| HK | 2 | Jamie George (cc) | | (substituted off) 76' |
| LP | 1 | Fin Baxter | | (substituted off) 57' |
Substitutions:
| HK | 16 | Theo Dan | | (substituted on) 76' |
| PR | 17 | Bevan Rodd | | (substituted on) 57' |
| PR | 18 | Asher Opoku-Fordjour | | (substituted on) 57' |
| FL | 19 | Chandler Cunningham-South | | (substituted on) 50' | (substituted off) 64' |
| FL | 20 | Guy Pepper | | (substituted on) 62' |
| N8 | 21 | Alex Dombrandt | | (substituted on) 61' |
| SH | 22 | Jack van Poortvliet | | (substituted on) 57' |
| WG | 23 | Cadan Murley | | (substituted on) 62' |
Coach:
(England) Steve Borthwick

Player of the Match:
Tom Roebuck (England)

Assistant referees:
Luc Ramos (France)
Gianluca Gnecchi (Italy)
Television match official:
Olly Hodges (Ireland)
Foul play review officer:
Mike Adamson (Scotland)

Notes:

- Bautista Bernasconi, Simón Benítez Cruz, Benjamín Elizalde, Nicolas Roger (all Argentina), Seb Atkinson, Will Muir and Guy Pepper (all England) made their international debuts.
- George Ford became the eighth Englishman to earn 100 test caps.
- Pablo Matera matched Agustín Creevy's record as Argentina's most capped player (110 caps).

=== Argentina vs England (second test) ===
12 July 2025
16:40 ART (UTC-03)

| Argentina | 17–22 | England |
| Try: Cinti 26' c Mendy 39' c Con: Carreras (2/2) 27', 40'; Pen: Carreras (1/1) 8' | Report | Try: Atkinson 3' c Steward 33' c van Poortvliet 79' m Con: Ford (2/3) 4', 34'; Pen: Ford (1/1) 53' |

Estadio San Juan del Bicentenario, San Juan
Attendance: 20,000
Referee: Luc Ramos (France)

Argentina
England

| FB | 15 | Benjamín Elizalde |
| RW | 14 | Matías Moroni |
| OC | 13 | Lucio Cinti |
| IC | 12 | Justo Piccardo |
| LW | 11 | Ignacio Mendy |
| FH | 10 | Santiago Carreras | | (substituted off) 66' |
| SH | 9 | Simón Benítez Cruz | | (substituted off) 71' |
| N8 | 8 | Pablo Matera | (yellow card) 58' | (substituted off) 71' |
| OF | 7 | Juan Martín González |
| BF | 6 | Santiago Grondona | | (substituted off) 60' |
| RL | 5 | Pedro Rubiolo | | (substituted off) 77' |
| LL | 4 | Guido Petti |
| TP | 3 | Francisco Gómez Kodela | | (substituted off) 42' |
| HK | 2 | Julián Montoya (c) | | (substituted off) 77' |
| LP | 1 | Thomas Gallo | | (substituted off) 46' |
Substitutions:
| HK | 16 | Bautista Bernasconi | | (substituted on) 77' |
| PR | 17 | Mayco Vivas | | (substituted on) 46' |
| PR | 18 | Pedro Delgado | | (substituted on) 42' |
| LK | 19 | Lucas Paulos | | (substituted on) 77' |
| N8 | 20 | Facundo Isa | | (substituted on) 60' |
| FL | 21 | Benjamín Grondona | | (substituted on) 71' |
| SH | 22 | Agustín Moyano | | (substituted on) 71' |
| FH | 23 | Nicolas Roger | | (substituted on) 66' |
Coach:
(Argentina) Felipe Contepomi

| FB | 15 | Freddie Steward |
| RW | 14 | Tom Roebuck |
| OC | 13 | Luke Northmore | | | (substituted off) 71' |
| IC | 12 | Seb Atkinson |
| LW | 11 | Will Muir | | (substituted off) 60' |
| FH | 10 | George Ford (c) |
| SH | 9 | Ben Spencer | | (substituted off) 60' |
| N8 | 8 | Tom Willis | | (substituted off) 65' |
| OF | 7 | Sam Underhill | | (substituted off) 57' | (substituted on) 71' |
| BF | 6 | Ben Curry | (yellow card) 20' |
| RL | 5 | Alex Coles | | (substituted off) 77' |
| LL | 4 | Charlie Ewels |
| TP | 3 | Joe Heyes | | (substituted off) 57' |
| HK | 2 | Theo Dan | | (substituted off) 48' |
| LP | 1 | Fin Baxter | | (substituted off) 57' |
Substitutions:
| HK | 16 | Curtis Langdon | | (substituted on) 48' |
| PR | 17 | Bevan Rodd | | (substituted on) 57' |
| PR | 18 | Asher Opoku-Fordjour | | (substituted on) 57' |
| FL | 19 | Chandler Cunningham-South | | (substituted on) 77' |
| FL | 20 | Guy Pepper | | (substituted on) 57' |
| N8 | 21 | Alex Dombrandt | | (substituted on) 65' |
| SH | 22 | Jack van Poortvliet | | (substituted on) 60' |
| WG | 23 | Cadan Murley | | (substituted on) 60' |
Coach:
(England) Steve Borthwick

Assistant referees:
Angus Gardner (Australia)
Gianluca Gnecchi (Italy)
Television match official:
Mike Adamson (Scotland)
Foul play review officer:
Olly Hodges (Ireland)

Notes:

- Benjamín Grondona, Agustín Moyano (both Argentina) and Luke Northmore (England) made their international debuts.
- Pablo Matera earned his 111th test cap to surpass Agustín Creevy's record as Argentina's most capped player.

=== United States vs England ===
19 July 2025
19:05 EDT (UTC-04) (Note: The match was originally scheduled to kick off at 18:00 EDT, but was delayed due to weather and was rescheduled for 19:05. The game was also paused during the 29th minute due to lightening in the area.)

| United States | 5–40 | England |
| Try: Klein 80+3' m | Report | Try: Langdon 12' c Northmore 19' c Murley 40+2' m van Poortvliet 41' c Randall 62' c Oghre 74' c Con: Ford (4/5) 13', 19', 42', 63'; Atkinson (1/1) 75' |

Audi Field, Washington, D.C.
Attendance: 19,079
Referee: Sam Grove-White (Scotland)

United States
England

| FB | 15 | Erich Storti |
| RW | 14 | Rufus McLean | | (substituted off) 65' |
| OC | 13 | Dominic Besag |
| IC | 12 | Tom Pittman |
| LW | 11 | Toby Fricker |
| FH | 10 | Christopher Hilsenbeck | (yellow card) 10' |
| SH | 9 | Ruben de Haas | | (substituted off) 52' |
| N8 | 8 | Jamason Faʻanana-Schultz | | (substituted off) 64' |
| OF | 7 | Cory Daniel | | (substituted off) 52' |
| BF | 6 | Benjamín Bonasso (c) |
| RL | 5 | Tevita Naqali |
| LL | 4 | Marno Redelinghuys | | (substituted off) 19' |
| TP | 3 | Pono Davis | | (substituted off) 42' |
| HK | 2 | Kaleb Geiger | | (substituted off) 64' |
| LP | 1 | Ezekiel Lindenmuth | | (substituted off) 47' |
Substitutions:
| HK | 16 | Shilo Klein | | (substituted on) 64' |
| PR | 17 | Jack Iscaro | | (substituted on) 47' |
| PR | 18 | Tonga Kofe | | (substituted on) 42' |
| LK | 19 | Vili Helu | | (substituted on) 19' |
| FL | 20 | Christian Poidevin | | (substituted on) 64' |
| FL | 21 | Makeen Alikhan | | (substituted on) 52' |
| SH | 22 | Juan-Philip Smith | | (substituted on) 52' |
| WG | 23 | Lauina Futi | | (substituted on) 65' |
Coach:
(United States) Scott Lawrence

| FB | 15 | Joe Carpenter |
| RW | 14 | Immanuel Feyi-Waboso |
| OC | 13 | Luke Northmore | (substituted off) 61' |
| IC | 12 | Max Ojomoh |
| LW | 11 | Cadan Murley |
| FH | 10 | George Ford (c) | (substituted off) 62' |
| SH | 9 | Jack van Poortvliet | (substituted off) 53' |
| N8 | 8 | Alex Dombrandt | (substituted off) 51' |
| OF | 7 | Guy Pepper |
| BF | 6 | Chandler Cunningham-South | (substituted off) 65' |
| RL | 5 | Arthur Clark |
| LL | 4 | Alex Coles |
| TP | 3 | Asher Opoku-Fordjour | (substituted off) 64' |
| HK | 2 | Curtis Langdon | (substituted off) 65' |
| LP | 1 | Bevan Rodd | (substituted off) 50' |
Substitutions:
| HK | 16 | Gabriel Oghre | (substituted on) 65' |
| PR | 17 | Fin Baxter | (substituted on) 50' |
| PR | 18 | Trevor Davison | (substituted on) 64' |
| FL | 19 | Ted Hill | (substituted on) 65' |
| FL | 20 | Ben Curry | (substituted on) 51' |
| SH | 21 | Harry Randall | (substituted on) 53' |
| SH | 22 | Charlie Atkinson | (substituted on) 62' |
| CE | 23 | Oscar Beard | (substituted on) 61' |
Coach:
(England) Steve Borthwick

Assistant referees:
Morné Ferreira (South Africa)
Robin Kaluzniak (Canada)
Television match official:
Matteo Liperini (Italy)

Notes:

- Ezekiel Lindenmuth, Rufus McLean (both USA), Charlie Atkinson, Oscar Beard, Joe Carpenter, Arthur Clark, Gabriel Oghre and Max Ojomoh (all England) made their international debuts.

== Squads ==
=== England ===
On 23 June 2025, England named a 36-player squad for their two-test series against Argentina and another international fixture against the United States in July.

- Ages and caps updated at the start of the tour.

| Player | Position | Date of birth (age) | Caps | Club/province |
|---|---|---|---|---|
| Theo Dan | Hooker | 26 December 2000 (aged 24) | 17 | (England) Saracens |
| Jamie George | Hooker | 20 October 1990 (aged 34) | 101 | (England) Saracens |
| Curtis Langdon | Hooker | 3 August 1997 (aged 27) | 2 | (England) Northampton Saints |
| Fin Baxter | Prop | 12 February 2002 (aged 23) | 11 | (England) Harlequins |
| Trevor Davison | Prop | 20 August 1992 (aged 32) | 2 | (England) Northampton Saints |
| Joe Heyes | Prop | 13 April 1999 (aged 26) | 12 | (England) Leicester Tigers |
| Emmanuel Iyogun | Prop | 24 November 2000 (aged 24) | 0 | (England) Northampton Saints |
| Asher Opoku-Fordjour | Prop | 16 July 2004 (aged 20) | 1 | (England) Sale Sharks |
| Bevan Rodd | Prop | 26 August 2000 (aged 24) | 7 | (England) Sale Sharks |
| Arthur Clark | Lock | 19 December 2001 (aged 23) | 0 | (England) Gloucester |
| Alex Coles | Lock | 21 September 1999 (aged 25) | 7 | (England) Northampton Saints |
| Charlie Ewels | Lock | 25 June 1995 (aged 30) | 31 | (England) Bath |
| Nick Isiekwe | Lock | 20 August 1998 (aged 26) | 15 | (England) Saracens |
| Chandler Cunningham-South | Back row | 18 March 2003 (aged 22) | 15 | (England) Harlequins |
| Ben Curry | Back row | 15 June 1998 (aged 27) | 11 | (England) Sale Sharks |
| Alex Dombrandt | Back row | 29 April 1997 (aged 28) | 20 | (England) Harlequins |
| Ted Hill | Back row | 26 March 1999 (aged 26) | 4 | (England) Bath |
| Guy Pepper | Back row | 21 April 2003 (aged 22) | 0 | (England) Bath |
| Sam Underhill | Back row | 22 November 1996 (aged 28) | 40 | (England) Bath |
| Tom Willis | Back row | 18 January 1999 (aged 26) | 6 | (England) Saracens |
| Harry Randall | Scrum-half | 18 December 1997 (aged 27) | 13 | (England) Bristol Bears |
| Ben Spencer | Scrum-half | 31 July 1992 (aged 32) | 8 | (England) Bath |
| Jack van Poortvliet | Scrum-half | 15 May 2001 (aged 24) | 18 | (England) Leicester Tigers |
| Charlie Atkinson | Fly-half | 6 October 2001 (aged 23) | 0 | (England) Gloucester |
| George Ford | Fly-half | 16 March 1993 (aged 32) | 99 | (England) Sale Sharks |
| Seb Atkinson | Centre | 21 May 2002 (aged 23) | 0 | (England) Gloucester |
| Oscar Beard | Centre | 20 November 2001 (aged 23) | 0 | (England) Harlequins |
| Luke Northmore | Centre | 16 March 1997 (aged 28) | 0 | (England) Harlequins |
| Max Ojomoh | Centre | 14 September 2000 (aged 24) | 0 | (England) Bath |
| Henry Slade | Centre | 19 March 1993 (aged 32) | 72 | (England) Exeter Chiefs |
| Immanuel Feyi-Waboso | Wing | 20 December 2002 (aged 22) | 8 | (England) Exeter Chiefs |
| Will Muir | Wing | 30 October 1995 (aged 29) | 0 | (England) Bath |
| Cadan Murley | Wing | 31 January 1999 (aged 26) | 1 | (England) Harlequins |
| Tom Roebuck | Wing | 7 January 2001 (aged 24) | 4 | (England) Sale Sharks |
| Joe Carpenter | Fullback | 19 August 2001 (aged 23) | 0 | (England) Sale Sharks |
| Freddie Steward | Fullback | 5 December 2000 (aged 24) | 36 | (England) Leicester Tigers |

=== Argentina ===
On 23 June 2025, Argentina named a 34-player squad for their two-test series against England and another international fixture against Uruguay in July.

- Ages and caps updated at the start of the tour.

| Player | Position | Date of birth (age) | Caps | Club/province |
|---|---|---|---|---|
| Bautista Bernasconi | Hooker | 14 September 2001 (aged 23) | 0 | (Italy) Benetton |
| Julián Montoya (c) | Hooker | 29 October 1993 (aged 31) | 105 | (France) Pau |
| Leonel Oviedo | Hooker | 16 February 1998 (aged 27) | 0 | (Argentina) Dogos |
| Francisco Coria Marchetti | Prop | 7 October 2000 (aged 24) | 1 | (France) Brive |
| Pedro Delgado | Prop | 1 September 1997 (aged 27) | 2 | (Argentina) Dogos |
| Thomas Gallo | Prop | 30 April 1999 (aged 26) | 35 | (Italy) Benetton |
| Francisco Gómez Kodela | Prop | 7 July 1985 (aged 39) | 41 | (France) Stade Français |
| Mayco Vivas | Prop | 2 June 1998 (aged 27) | 28 | (France) Oyonnax |
| Boris Wenger | Prop | 1 July 2002 (aged 23) | 0 | (Argentina) Dogos |
| Luciano Asevedo | Lock | 28 May 2004 (aged 21) | 0 | (Argentina) Tarucas |
| Lucas Paulos | Lock | 9 January 1998 (aged 27) | 14 | (France) Bayonne |
| Pedro Rubiolo | Lock | 21 December 2002 (aged 22) | 20 | (England) Bristol Bears |
| Lautaro Simes | Lock | 3 April 2004 (aged 21) | 0 | (Argentina) Dogos |
| Juan Martín González | Back row | 14 November 2000 (aged 24) | 40 | (England) Saracens |
| Benjamín Grondona | Back row | 19 October 2003 (aged 21) | 0 | (England) Bristol Bears |
| Santiago Grondona | Back row | 25 July 1998 (aged 26) | 20 | (England) Bristol Bears |
| Facundo Isa | Back row | 21 September 1993 (aged 31) | 51 | (France) Toulon |
| Pablo Matera | Back row | 18 July 1993 (aged 31) | 109 | (Japan) Mie Honda Heat |
| Joaquin Moro | Back row | 24 January 2001 (aged 24) | 1 | (England) Leicester Tigers |
| Simon Benitez Cruz | Scrum-half | 6 September 1999 (aged 25) | 0 | (Argentina) Tarucas |
| Gonzalo Bertranou | Scrum-half | 31 December 1993 (aged 31) | 67 | (United States) Los Angeles |
| Agustín Moyano | Scrum-half | 12 June 2001 (aged 24) | 0 | (Argentina) Dogos |
| Santiago Carreras | Fly-half | 30 March 1998 (aged 27) | 53 | (England) Bath |
| Nicolas Roger | Fly-half | 11 January 2000 (aged 25) | 0 | (Argentina) Tarucas |
| Lucio Cinti | Centre | 23 February 2000 (aged 25) | 32 | (England) Saracens |
| Matías Moroni | Centre | 29 March 1991 (aged 34) | 89 | (France) Brive |
| Justo Piccardo | Centre | 25 March 2002 (aged 23) | 1 | (Argentina) Pampas |
| Faustino Sanchez Valarolo | Centre | 8 July 2004 (aged 20) | 0 | (Argentina) Dogos |
| Santiago Cordero | Wing | 6 December 1993 (aged 31) | 54 | (Ireland) Connacht |
| Rodrigo Isgró | Wing | 23 March 1999 (aged 26) | 7 | (England) Harlequins |
| Alfonso Latorre | Wing | 20 December 1999 (aged 25) | 0 | (Argentina) Pampas |
| Ignacio Mendy | Wing | 29 June 2000 (aged 25) | 2 | (Italy) Benetton |
| Santiago Pernas | Wing | 11 August 2003 (aged 21) | 0 | (Argentina) Pampas |
| Benjamín Elizalde | Fullback | 14 June 2004 (aged 21) | 0 | (England) Bristol Bears |

== See also ==
- 2025 mid-year rugby union tests
- 2025 British & Irish Lions tour to Australia
- 2025 France rugby union tour of New Zealand
- 2025 Italy rugby union tour of Namibia and South Africa
- 2025 Wales rugby union tour of Japan
