= Gabriel Oghre =

English rugby union player

- Born: Gabriel Oghenetega Oghre; 25 May 1998 (age 28) Westminster, England
- Height: 1.72 m (5 ft 8 in)
- Weight: 103 kg (16 st 3 lb; 227 lb)
- School: Beechen Cliff School; Millfield

Rugby union career
- Position: Hooker
- Current team: Bristol Bears
Senior career
Years	Team	Apps	(Points)
2017–2022	Wasps	66	(65)
2022	Leicester Tigers	3	(0)
2023	Bordeaux	9	(0)
2023–	Bristol Bears	41	(60)
- Correct as of 6 June 2025
International career
Years	Team	Apps	(Points)
2017	England U19	1	(0)
2018	England U20	8	(0)
2024–	England A	2	(0)
2025–	England	1	(5)
- Correct as of 19 July 2025

Gabriel Oghre (born 25 May 1998) is an English professional rugby union player who plays as a hooker for Premiership Rugby club Bristol Bears. He previously represented Wasps where he appeared 66 times for the club, before short spells with Bordeaux in France's Top 14 and Leicester Tigers, following Wasps entering administration at the start of the 2022–23 Premiership Rugby season.

== Club career ==
Oghre joined the academy of Bath from Millfield. He did not make an appearance for the Bath senior side and in July 2017 signed for Wasps. In November 2017 he made his club debut against Newcastle Falcons in the Anglo-Welsh Cup and the following year made his league debut against Saracens. Oghre came off the bench during the final of the 2019–20 Premiership Rugby season as Wasps finished runners up to Exeter Chiefs.

Wasps entered administration on 17 October 2022 and Ohgre was made redundant along with all other players and coaching staff. On 21 November 2022, Oghre joined Leicester Tigers on a short term deal. He made his Leicester debut as a replacement on 11 December 2022 in a 23-17 win against the Ospreys, and featured twice more for Leicester before joining Bordeaux for the rest of the 2022–23 Top 14 season.

In March 2023 it was announced that Oghre had signed for Bristol Bears.

== International career ==
In April 2017 Oghre made an appearance for England at under-19 level. He represented the England under-20 team that finished runners up to France in the 2018 Six Nations Under 20s Championship and 2018 World Rugby Under 20 Championship.

In September 2021 Oghre was called up to the senior England squad for a training camp. He was a member of their 2024 tour of New Zealand although did not make an appearance. In November 2024 Oghre started for England A in a victory over Australia A.

In July 2025, Oghre was called up to the England squad, alongside Jamie Blamire, to replace Jamie George, who had been called away for British & Irish Lions duty and Theo Dan, who had sustained a knee injury, for their 2025 summer tour. On 19 July 2025 Oghre made his Test debut scoring a try in a victory against the United States.

=== List of international tries ===
as of 19 July 2025.

No.	Date	Venue	Opponent	Score	Result	Competition	Ref.
1	19 July 2025	Audi Field, Washington, D.C., United States	United States	38–0	40–5	2025 summer tour	
