= Luke Northmore =

English rugby union player

- Born: Luke Ryan Northmore; 16 March 1997 (age 29) Tavistock, England
- Height: 1.88 m (6 ft 2 in)
- Weight: 99 kg (15 st 8 lb)
- University: Cardiff Metropolitan University

Rugby union career
- Position: Centre
- Current team: Harlequins
Senior career
Years	Team	Apps	(Points)
2019–	Harlequins	100	(160)
- Correct as of 11 May 2026
International career
Years	Team	Apps	(Points)
2025–	England	2	(5)
- Correct as of 20 July 2025

Luke Northmore (born 16 March 1997) is an English professional rugby union player who plays centre for Premiership Rugby club Harlequins and the England national team.

== Early years and education ==
Northmore started playing rugby for Tavistock RFC at age 15. He played for his university, Cardiff Met.

== Club career ==
After university, in 2019, Northmore moved to Premiership club Harlequins. In his first season at the club he started in the 2019–20 Premiership Rugby Cup final which they lost against Sale Sharks to finish runners up.

Northmore was a replacement in the Premiership final against Exeter Chiefs on 26 June 2021 as Harlequins won the game 40–38 in the highest scoring Premiership final ever to become league champions.

In April 2024, Northmore scored twice against league leaders Northampton Saints in a 41-32 victory at Twickenham Stadium for the Big Summer Kick Off. The following month he started in their European Rugby Champions Cup semi-final elimination against Toulouse.

== International career ==
Northmore was called up to the senior England squad for the 2022 Six Nations Championship.

In July 2025, Northmore made his debut for the senior side in the second test of the 2025 summer tour, assisting the first try of the match scored by Seb Atkinson in a 22–17 victory over Argentina to help claim a 2–0 series victory. In the last game of the tour, Northmore scored his first international try during a 40–5 victory over the United States.

=== List of international tries ===
As of 20 July 2025

No.	Date	Venue	Opponent	Score	Result	Competition	Ref.
1	20 July 2025	Audi Field, Washington, D.C., United States	United States	12–0	40–5	2025 summer tour	

== Honours ==
Harlequins

- Premiership Rugby: 2020–2021
- Premiership Rugby Cup runner-up: 2019–2020
