= Curtis Langdon =

England international rugby union player

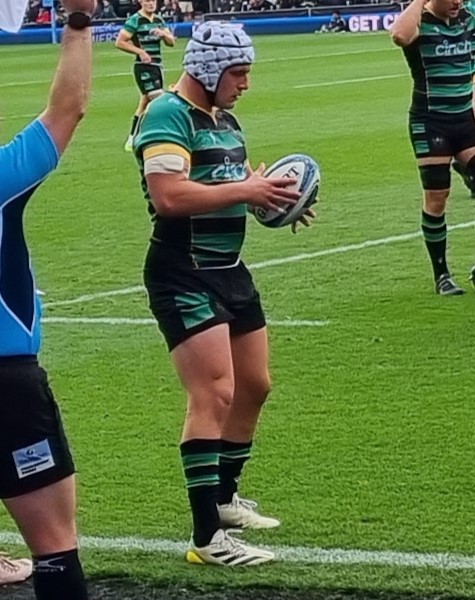
- Langdon in 2023
- Born: Curtis John Langdon; 3 August 1997 (age 29) Weston-super-Mare, England
- Height: 1.84 m (6 ft 0 in)
- Weight: 107 kg (236 lb; 16 st 12 lb)
- School: Priory Community School; St Paul's College

Rugby union career
- Position: Hooker
- Current team: Northampton Saints
Senior career
Years	Team	Apps	(Points)
2015–2016	London Irish	0	(0)
2015–2016	→ Henley Hawks (loan)	18	(5)
2016–2022	Sale Sharks	89	(70)
2016–2017	→ Macclesfield (loan)	8	(0)
2017–2019	→ Doncaster Knights (loan)	13	(10)
2017–2018	→ Fylde (loan)	4	(0)
2022	Worcester Warriors	3	(5)
2022–2023	Montpellier	13	(5)
2023–	Northampton Saints	58	(80)
- Correct as of 25 May 2025
International career
Years	Team	Apps	(Points)
2015	England U18	5	(5)
2016–2017	England U20	6	(5)
2024–	England A	2	(5)
2021–	England	4	(5)
- Correct as of 20 July 2025

Curtis John Langdon (born 3 August 1997) is an English professional rugby union player who plays as a hooker for Premiership Rugby club Northampton Saints.

== Club career ==
Langdon began playing rugby age six in Weston-super-Mare at Hornets Rugby club and joined London Irish aged fifteen. On 10 August 2016, he left London Irish to join Sale Sharks. Langdon scored a try for the Sale side that defeated Harlequins in the 2019–20 Premiership Rugby Cup final.

In March 2022, it was confirmed that Langdon would end his six-year spell with Sale to join Worcester Warriors. Shortly after this transfer, Worcester encountered financial issues and in October 2022 his contract along with every other Warriors player was terminated. He subsequently joined Montpellier for the remainder of their 2022–23 Top 14 season.

After one campaign in France it was announced in January 2023 that Langdon would leave to join Northampton Saints. In his first season at the club, he played in their 2023–24 European Rugby Champions Cup semi-final elimination against Leinster. That same month, he was named in the Premiership Rugby Team of the Season for the 2023–24 campaign. He then started in the 2023–24 Premiership Rugby final which saw Northampton defeat Bath to become league champions.

Langdon scored a try during the 2024–25 European Rugby Champions Cup quarter-final victory over Castres. He started in the 2025 European Rugby Champions Cup final at Millennium Stadium as Northampton lost to Bordeaux Bègles to finish runners up.

== International career ==
Langdon represented England under-18 at the 2015 Rugby Europe Under-18 Championship. The following year saw him score a try for the England under-20 team against Italy in the 2016 Six Nations Under 20s Championship. Langdon was a member of the side that completed a grand slam during the 2017 Six Nations Under 20s Championship.

In June 2021, Langdon was included in the senior England squad by coach Eddie Jones. On 4 July 2021, he made his Test debut starting against the United States at Twickenham. A week later, he made a second appearance in a victory over Canada.

In January 2025, following an injury to Jamie George, Langdon was called into the senior training squad for the 2025 Six Nations. On 21 February 2025, after not playing for England during the 2025 Six Nations despite being called up to the senior training squad, Langdon was named as vice-captain for the England A game against Ireland Wolfhounds at Ashton Gate on 23 February 2025.

Langdon was included in the squad for the 2025 England rugby union tour of Argentina and the United States. He replaced Theo Dan as a substitute to earn his first cap since 2021 in a 22–17 victory which completed a series win against Argentina. In their last tour fixture, Langdon scored his first try during a 40–5 victory over the United States.

=== List of international tries ===
as of 19 July 2025.

No.	Date	Venue	Opponent	Score	Result	Competition	Ref.
1	19 July 2025	Audi Field, Washington, D.C., United States	United States	5–0	40–5	2025 summer tour	

== Honours ==
Northampton Saints

- 2× Premiership Rugby: 2023–24, 2025–26
- 1× European Rugby Champions Cup runner-up: 2024–25

Sale Sharks

- 1× Premiership Rugby Cup: 2019–20

England U20

- 1× Six Nations Under 20s Championship: 2017
