= Mark Hopley =

English rugby union player

Mark Hopley (born 1 May 1984 (age 41) in Crewe, England) was a rugby union player for Northampton Saints in the Guinness Premiership. He played as a flanker and started his playing career at Whitchurch Rugby Club in Shropshire. Like his fellow Northampton teammate Ben Foden, he was educated at Bishop Heber High School in Malpas, Cheshire.

He is 6 ft 3 in (1.91 m) tall and weighs 16 st 0 lb (102 kg)

He made his debut for Northampton Saints in 2005 against Newcastle Falcons but really started to shine in the 2007/8 season where he dominated the number 8 shirt. He made 21 appearances and scored 3 tries.

He is now the Saints Academy coach, working alongside the other coaches in developing local talent.
