= Bishop Heber High School =

Location
- Yew Tree Road; Malpas, Cheshire, SY14 8JD; England; 53°01′47″N 2°45′38″W

Information
- Type: Foundation school
- Established: 1960
- Local authority: Cheshire West and Chester
- Department for Education URN: 111424 Tables
- Ofsted: Reports
- Headteacher: Mr David Curry
- Faculty: 90
- Gender: Coeducational
- Age: 11 to 18
- Enrolment: 1310
- Website: https://www.bishopheber.cheshire.sch.uk

Bishop Heber High School is a comprehensive secondary school in Malpas, Cheshire, England. The school is named after bishop Reginald Heber (1783–1826), who was born in Malpas and is remembered as a hymn-writer.

In January 2022, the school was criticised for allowing only school-branded coats to be worn on site. Parents claimed that children were in jumpers and 'freezing' while staff were in warm coats.

== Notable former pupils ==
- Ben Curry: rugby union footballer for Sale Sharks
- Tom Curry: rugby union footballer for Sale Sharks
- Jo Fletcher: footballer for Everton ladies and England ladies
- Ben Foden: rugby union footballer for Northampton Saints and England
- Mark Hopley: rugby union footballer and coach for Northampton Saints
- Vicky Thornley: Olympic rower
- Christina Trevanion: professional antiques dealer and television personality
- Ben Woodburn: footballer for Liverpool and Wales
