= Guy Pepper =

English rugby union player

- Born: 21 April 2003 (age 23) Harrogate, England
- Height: 190 cm (6 ft 3 in)
- Weight: 105 kg (231 lb; 16 st 7 lb)
- School: Barnard Castle School
- University: Durham University
- Notable relative: Max Pepper

Rugby union career
- Position: Flanker
Senior career
Years	Team	Apps	(Points)
2021–2024	Newcastle Falcons	26	(25)
2024–	Bath	35	(45)
- Correct as of 1 May 2026
International career
Years	Team	Apps	(Points)
2021	England U18		
2023	England U20		
2024–	England A	1	(0)
2025–	England	12	(0)
- Correct as of 24 November 2025

Guy Pepper (born 15 April 2003) is an English professional rugby union player who plays as a flanker for Premiership Rugby club Bath and the England national team.

== Early life and education ==
From Eggleston, in Teesdale, Pepper attended Barnard Castle School. He had to give up playing rugby for a time as a youngster due to developing arthritis.

Pepper gained a degree in Sport and Exercise Science at Durham University, partly completed remotely whilst playing professional rugby for Bath.

== Club career ==
Pepper trained with the academy at Newcastle Falcons during the COVID-19 pandemic when matches were limited. In May 2021 Pepper signed his first professional contract with the Newcastle Falcons. He continued to train with Newcastle whilst completing a degree at Durham University.

Pepper scored three tries in his first seven appearances for Newcastle prior to signing a new two-year contract with the club in April 2023. In May 2024, he was nominated for Premiership Rugby Breakthrough Player of the Season.

In April 2024, Pepper agreed to join Bath Rugby from the 2024–25 season, on a three-year contract. He made a try-scoring league debut for Bath on 29 September 2024, in their opening Premiership Rugby fixture of the season, an away win at Leicester Tigers. In June 2025, he scored an individual try from the Leicester 22-metre line that was eventually chalked off before winning Man of the Match in a 23–21 victory over Leicester Tigers in the 2024–25 Premiership Rugby final.

== International career ==
Pepper has represented England at U18 level. In January 2023 he was named in the England U20 squad for the first time. In February 2024 he started for the England A team in a victory over Portugal.

On 10 March 2024, Pepper was called up to train with the senior England squad by coach Steve Borthwick for the conclusion of their 2024 Six Nations campaign.

In May 2025 Pepper was called up to a training camp for the senior England squad. In June 2025, he played for an England XV side in a non-cap friendly against a France XV, which they lost 24–26 at Twickenham Stadium. He won his first cap for England from the bench in a 35–12 victory over Argentina during the 2025 Summer Test Series. In the following match, he assisted Jack van Poortvliet for the deciding try also against Argentina in 22–17 victory to claim 2–0 series win.

Pepper was a try-scorer for England in a 73-8 win against Fiji during the 2026 Nations Championship on 11 July 2026.

== Personal life ==
Guy's father, Martin Pepper, played as a back row forward for Harlequins and represented England B. He is the Second Master at Barnard Castle School where he coached in Guy's later years as a pupil at the school. Guy's brother Max Pepper plays for Bristol Bears having formerly represented Newcastle Falcons. Max has played sevens for Great Britain.
