= Max Pepper =

English rugby union player (born 2001)

- Born: 9 May 2001 (age 25)
- Height: 1.84 m (6 ft 0 in)
- Weight: 88 kg (194 lb; 13 st 12 lb)
- University: University of Durham
- Notable relative: Guy Pepper

Rugby union career
- Position(s): Scrum-half, Wing
Senior career
Years	Team	Apps	(Points)
2024-2025	Newcastle Falcons	18	(25)
2025-	Bristol Bears	9	(10)
National sevens team
Years	Team		Comps
2024	Great Britain		

Max Pepper (born 9 May 2001) is an English professional English rugby union footballer who plays as a scrum-half and wing for Rugby Premiership side Bristol Bears. He has represented Great Britain at rugby sevens.

== Early life ==
He grew up in Barnard Castle and studied Sport, Exercise and Physical Activity at Durham University. He represented England Students at rugby union.

== Career ==
After being released from the Newcastle Falcons academy as an 18 year-old, he played for National League 1 club Darlington Mowden Park and played invitational rugby sevens for Shogun Rugby and was capped by the Great Britain national rugby sevens team.

Playing for Durham University he was named the British Universities and Colleges Sport (BUCS) player of the year for the 2023-24 season. He also made two appearances Newcastle Falcons during the 2023-24 season. He made a try-scoring debut for Newcastle against Caldy RFC in the Premiership Rugby Cup. He made his Premiership Rugby debut against Bristol Bears in April 2024. In June 2024, he signed a one-year professional contract with Newcastle Falcons.

He signed for Bristol Bears ahead of the 2025–26 season.

== Personal life ==
His father, Martin Pepper, played in the back row for Harlequins and represented England B and later became director of sport and second master at Barnard Castle School. His brother Guy Pepper is also a professional rugby union player.
