= John Olver (rugby union) =

England international rugby union player and coach

Christopher John Olver (born 23 April 1961) is an English former rugby union hooker who played for England, Northampton Saints and Harlequins. He earned three international caps.

Upon retirement Olver went into teaching and was master-in-charge of Rugby at Oundle School.

John Olver is the uncle of Sale players Tom and Ben Curry, both of whom have played for England. Their mother is John Olver's sister.
