= Will Muir =

English rugby union player (born 1995)

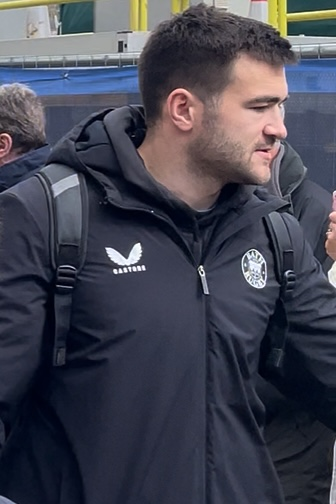
- Muir in 2024
- Born: William Richard Charles Muir; 30 October 1995 (age 31) Cleveland, Yorkshire, England
- Height: 1.87 m (6 ft 2 in)
- Weight: 94 kg (207 lb; 14 st 11 lb)
- University: Northumbria University

Rugby union career
- Position: Wing
- Current team: Bath
Senior career
Years	Team	Apps	(Points)
2020–	Bath	90	(205)
- Correct as of 1 May 2026
International career
Years	Team	Apps	(Points)
2024	England A	2	(10)
2025	England	3	(0)
- Correct as of 12 July 2025
National sevens team
Years	Team		Comps
2017–2020	England		17
- Correct as of 25 March 2021

Will Muir (born 30 October 1995) is an English professional rugby union player who plays as a wing for Bath in Premiership Rugby. He is nicknamed The Horse due to his long, powerful strides, which resemble a gallop as he sprints down the wing.

== Early life ==
Muir grew up on his family's pig farm.

After attending Stokesley Sixth Form College, Muir achieved a degree in mechanical engineering from Northumbria University, which he represented in the BUCS Super Rugby competition.

== Career ==
=== Club career ===
Muir started out his rugby journey playing for Guisborough Rugby Club at Fly Half. He was instrumental in the teams promotion to Level 6 of the English Rugby Pyramid and Player of the Year during the 2014/2015 season. After 2 seasons of juggling rugby at both Northumbria University and Guisborough Rugby Club. Muir left Guisborough and took a pivotal role for Northumbria in the BUCS Super Rugby. His performance in the university leagues led to switch to rugby sevens. He made his debut for England in the Assupol International Sevens tournament in South Africa in 2017.

In 2019 Muir was named England Sevens Player of the Year, the first person to do so in their debut season.

Muir signed for Bath Rugby from Guisborough Rugby Club in August 2020. Following a successful first season with Bath, he signed a new two-year contract with the club.

In December 2024, he scored a hattrick of tries as Bath defeated Saracens 68–10 to inflict them with their worst defeat in Premiership history.

=== International career ===
On 23 January 2024, Muir received his first call-up to the senior England squad by coach Steve Borthwick for their Six Nations campaign. The following month saw him score a try for the England A side during a victory over Portugal.

In May 2025 Muir was called up to a training camp for the senior England squad by Steve Borthwick.

Muir made his international debut for England in the starting line-up, which is a 12-35 victory over Argentina during the 2025 Summer Test Series.
