= Ben Curry =

England international rugby union player

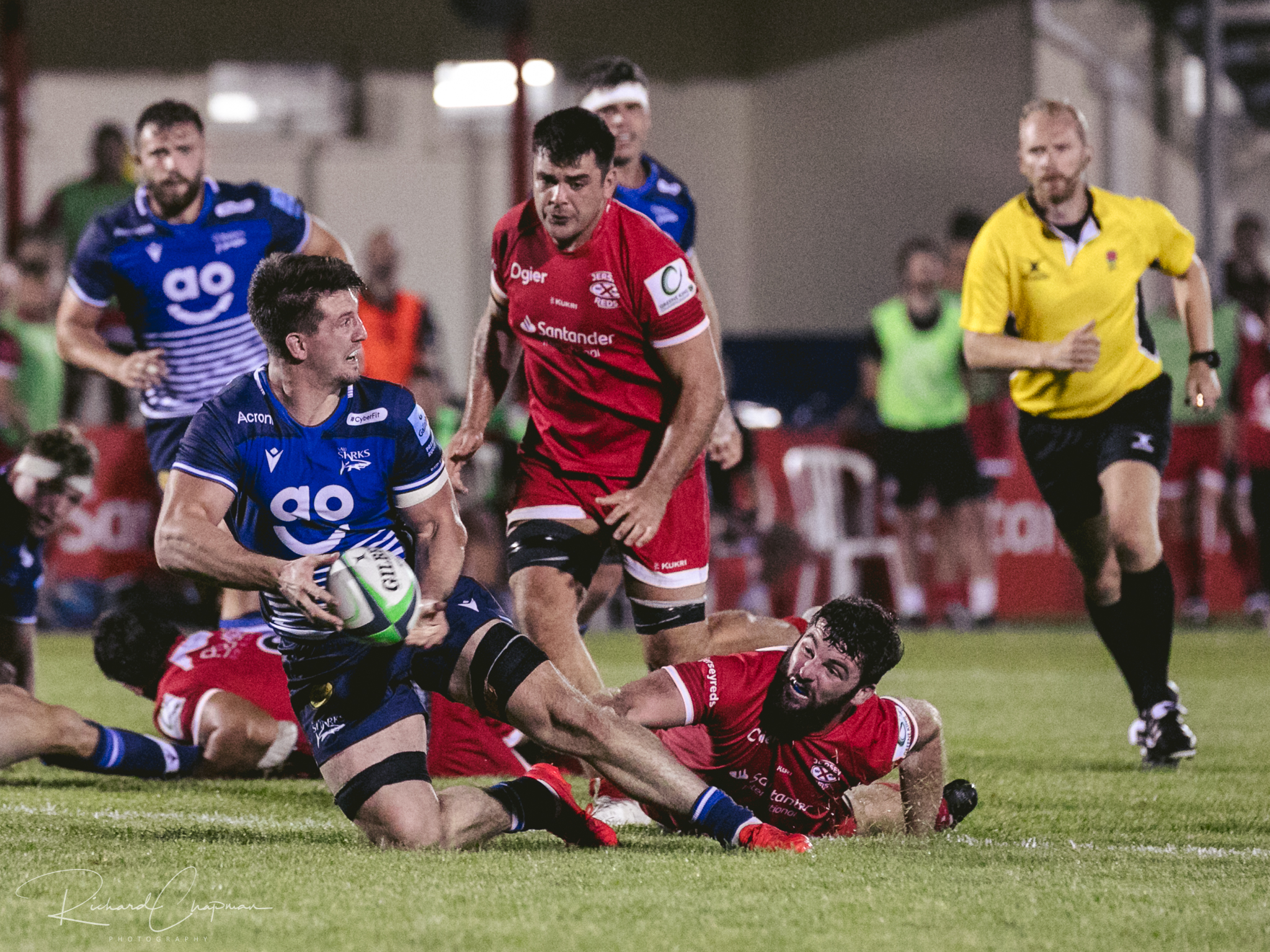
- Curry representing Sale Sharks during an exhibition game
- Full name: Ben Anthony Curry
- Born: 15 June 1998 (age 28) Hounslow, England
- Height: 1.85 m (6 ft 1 in)
- Weight: 106 kg (234 lb; 16 st 10 lb)
- School: Bishop Heber High School; Oundle School
- Notable relative(s): Tom Curry (brother); John Olver (uncle)

Rugby union career
- Position: Flanker
- Current team: Sale Sharks
Senior career
Years	Team	Apps	(Points)
2016–	Sale Sharks	180	(165)
- Correct as of 19 January 2025
International career
Years	Team	Apps	(Points)
2016	England U18	5	(0)
2017–2018	England U20	7	(5)
2021–	England	14	(5)
- Correct as of 14 November 2026

Ben Anthony Curry (born 15 June 1998) is an English professional rugby union player who plays as a flanker for Premiership Rugby club Sale Sharks and the England national team.

== Club career ==
Curry made his professional club debut against Wasps on 4 November 2016 in the Anglo-Welsh Cup. At the end of the 2016–17 season, he was named a joint recipient of Sale Sharks' Young Player of the Season award, sharing the award with his brother Tom.

Curry scored a try against Saracens in the semi-final of the 2019–20 Premiership Rugby Cup. In September 2020 he started for the Sale side that defeated Harlequins in the final to lift the trophy.

Curry started in their 2022–2023 league semi-final victory over Leicester Tigers. However an injury sustained in the win against Leicester ruled him out of the Premiership final which Sale lost against Saracens to finish runners up.

In December 2024, Curry scored a try and won man of the match as Sale beat Bristol Bears 0–38 away at Ashton Gate, the first time Bristol had been kept scoreless in a Premiership fixture since September 2016. At the end of that season he started in their league semi-final elimination against Leicester.

== International career ==
Curry was named in the England U20 squad for the 2016/17 season on 14 October 2016, having previously represented England U18. He was part of the England U20 squad that won the Grand Slam in the 2017 Six Nations Under 20 Championship. Curry was selected as the England U20 captain for the 2018 World Rugby Under 20 Championship on 29 May 2018. He started in the final as England finished runners up to hosts France.

Curry was called up to the senior England squad by coach Eddie Jones for their 2017 summer tour of Argentina but did not make an appearance. In June 2021 he was included in the senior squad again and on 4 July 2021 Curry made his Test debut off the bench against the United States at Twickenham.

In January 2025, Curry was named in the starting lineup alongside brother, Tom, for the first time at international level for the opening match of the 2025 Six Nations against Ireland. Curry played in all five rounds of the tournament as England finished runners up. Later that year he was selected for their 2025 summer tour. He started in both games against Argentina as England completed a 2–0 series victory. He also started in England's 40 - 5 win against the United States in Washington, D.C.

Following a severe hamstring injury that saw him miss the majority of the 2025-26 season Curry's next appearance for England was in their 2026 Nations Championship fixture against Australia, which England won 45 - 22. Curry scored his first international try for England in their fixture against Japan the following weekend.

=== List of international tries ===
As of 19 November 2026

Try	Opposing team	Location	Venue	Competition	Date	Result	Score
1	Japan	London, England	Twickenham Stadium	2026 Nations Championship	14 November 2026	Win	78 -15

== Personal life ==
Curry is the twin brother of Sale Sharks flanker Tom Curry, nephew of former England hooker John Olver and cousin of former Northampton Saints fly-half Sam Olver. John Olver also taught at Oundle School where Ben Curry was educated. Curry was educated at Bishop Heber High School in Cheshire.

== Honours ==
Sale Sharks

- Premiership Rugby Cup: 2019–2020
- Premiership Rugby runner-up: 2022–2023

England U20

- Six Nations Under 20s Championship: 2017
- World Rugby U20 Championship runner-up: 2018
