= Lucio Cinti =

Argentine rugby union player

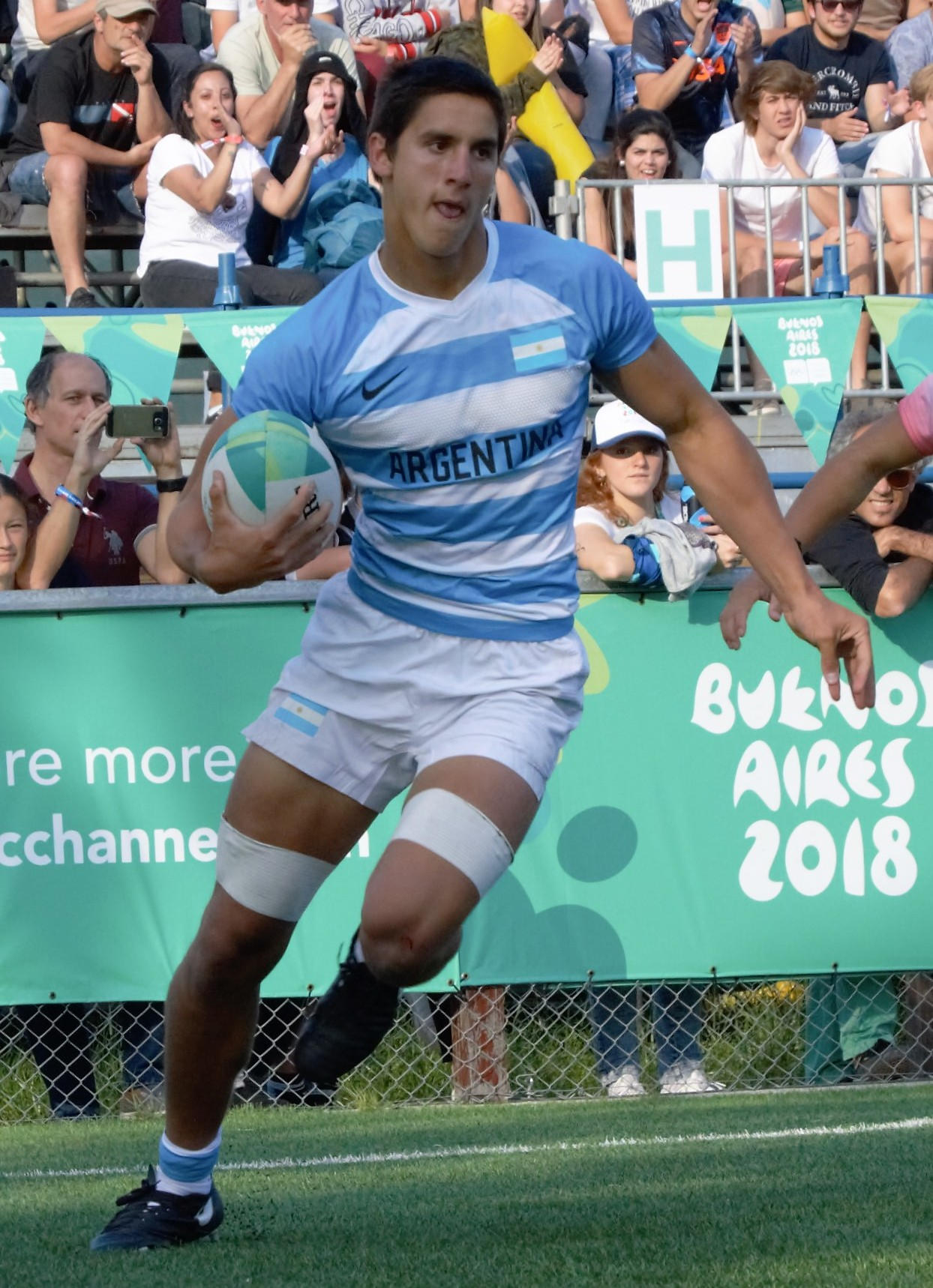
- Cinti representing Argentina during the Summer Youth Olympics
- Full name: Lucio Constantino Cinti Luna
- Born: 23 February 2000 (age 26) La Plata, Argentina
- Height: 1.90 m (6 ft 3 in)
- Weight: 97 kg (214 lb; 15 st 4 lb)

Rugby union career
- Position(s): Centre, Wing
- Current team: Saracens
Senior career
Years	Team	Apps	(Points)
2019	La Plata	5	(10)
2021–2023	London Irish	34	(35)
2023–	Saracens	24	(30)
- Correct as of 20 January 2024
International career
Years	Team	Apps	(Points)
2021–	Argentina	39	(15)
- Correct as of 28 August 2023
National sevens team
Years	Team		Comps
2018–2021	Argentina		7
- Correct as of 28 August 2023
Medal record
Men's rugby sevens
Representing Argentina
Summer Olympics
Bronze medal – third place	2020 Tokyo	Team competition

Lucio Constantino Cinti Luna (born 23 February 2000) is an Argentine professional rugby union player who plays as a centre for Premiership Rugby club Saracens and the Argentina national team.

== Club career ==
He joined Premiership Rugby side London Irish in October 2021. He moved to Saracens in June 2023, following the collapse of London Irish.

== International career ==
Cinti was named in the Argentine squad for the 2020 Tri Nations Series in October 2020. He was named in the side for Argentina's opening game of the tournament against New Zealand.
