= Seb Atkinson =

English rugby union player

- Born: Seb Atkinson; 21 May 2002 (age 24) London, England
- Height: 1.89 m (6 ft 2 in)
- Weight: 99 kg (218 lb; 15 st 8 lb)
- School: Bromsgrove School

Rugby union career
- Position: Centre
- Current team: Gloucester
Amateur team(s)
Years	Team	Apps	(Points)
- Luctonians
Senior career
Years	Team	Apps	(Points)
2020–2022	Worcester Warriors	9	(5)
2022–	Gloucester	75	(65)
- Correct as of 17 April 2026
International career
Years	Team	Apps	(Points)
2019–2020	England U18		
2020–2021	England U20		
2025	England XV	1	(0)
2025–	England	7	(10)
- Correct as of 18 July 2026

Seb Atkinson (born 21 May 2002) is an English professional rugby union player who plays as a centre for PREM Rugby club Gloucester and the England national team.

== Club career ==
Atkinson is a graduate of the Luctonians club in Herefordshire. He joined the Senior Academy at Sixways in the summer of 2020 having captained Warriors to third place in the 2019-20 Premiership Rugby Under-18s Academy League.

Atkinson joined Stourbridge on a dual registration in October 2021. He made his senior debut in the Premiership Rugby Cup win over Gloucester at Sixways Stadium in December 2021 and his Gallagher Premiership debut as a replacement against Sale Sharks in February 2022.

Due to the club entering administration, all Warriors players had their contracts terminated on 5 October 2022. On 17 October 2022, Atkinson signed for local rivals Gloucester ahead of the 2022–23 season, following his Worcester exit.

Atkinson made his Cherry & White debut in a 38–31 victory against Bristol Bears in the Premiership Rugby Cup, scoring a brilliant solo try in the process. With a number of notable performances in the Premiership Rugby Cup, Atkinson became a regular component of the Cherry & White midfield, with many appearances to his name across all competitions. At the end of the season, Atkinson was voted as young player of the season by fans.

On 30 March 2023, Atkinson signed a new deal to stay at Kingsholm, thus promoted to the senior squad ahead of the 2023–24 season. He scored a try in the 2023–24 Premiership Rugby Cup final as Gloucester defeated Leicester Tigers to win their first trophy for nine years. At the end of that season Atkinson started in the 2023–24 EPCR Challenge Cup final at Tottenham Hotspur Stadium which they lost against Sharks to finish runners up.

== International career ==
Atkinson was due to captain England Under-18s at the end of the 2019–20 season but their programme was cancelled owing to the COVID-19 pandemic. He was included in England squad for the 2021 Six Nations Under 20s Championship in Cardiff but was not used in any of their five matches in a Grand Slam-winning campaign. Atkinson was named in England Under-20s EPS squad for 2022 but remained uncapped at youth level.

In May 2025 Atkinson was called up to a training camp for the senior England squad by coach Steve Borthwick. The following month Atkinson played for an England XV side in a non–cap friendly against an France XV, which they lost 24–26 to the opposition at Twickenham Stadium.

Atkinson was included in the squad for the 2025 England rugby union tour of Argentina and the United States. On 5 July 2025 he made his Test debut starting in a 35–12 victory over Argentina. A week later in their next match Atkinson scored his first try at international level as England completed a 2–0 series win.

=== List of international tries ===
as of 11 July 2026.

No.	Date	Venue	Opponent	Score	Result	Competition	Ref.
1	12 July 2025	Estadio San Juan del Bicentenario, San Juan, Argentina	Argentina	5–0	22–17	2025 summer tour	
2	11 July 2026	Hill Dickinson Stadium, Liverpool, England	Fiji	33–3	73–18	2026 Nations Championship	

== Honours ==
Gloucester

- Premiership Rugby Cup: 2023–2024
- EPCR Challenge Cup runner-up: 2023–2024
