= Estadio Jorge Luis Hirschi =

Football stadium in La Plata, Argentina

Coordinates: 34°54′43″S 57°56′20″W

Jorge Luis Hirschi Stadium
- Estadio Jorge Luis Hirschi
- Uno (One)
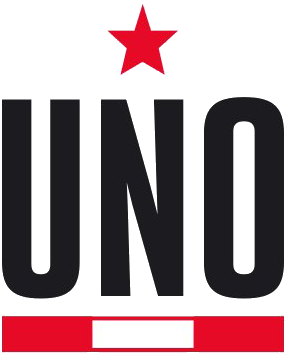

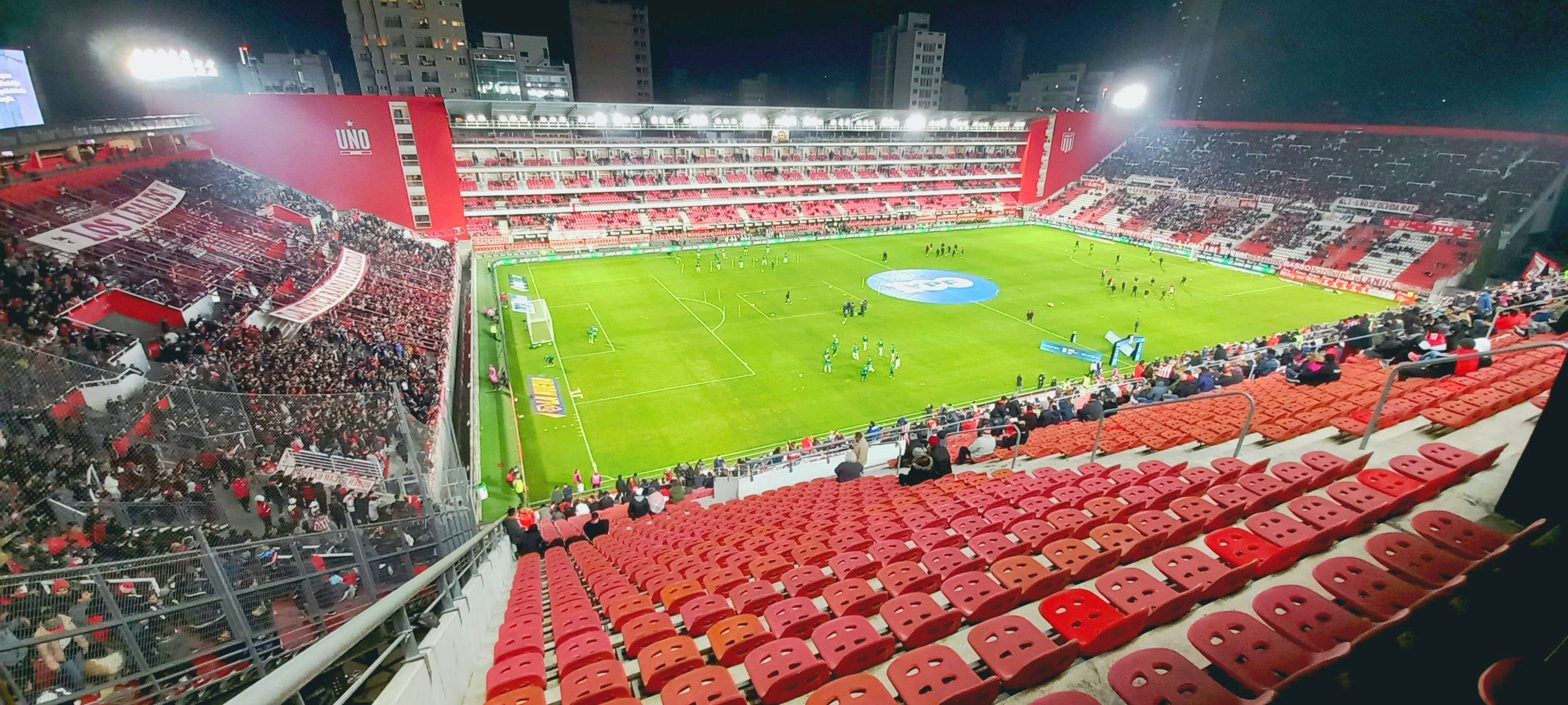
- The stadium during a match in 2022
- Interactive map of Jorge Luis Hirschi Stadium
- Former names: Estadio de Estudiantes (LP) (1907–1970)
- Address: Av. 1 no. 1150; La Plata; Argentina
- Owner: Estudiantes de La Plata
- Capacity: 32,530
- Type: Stadium
- Surface: Grass
- Field size: 105 x 68
- Current use: Football; Rugby; Concerts

Construction
- Opened: 25 December 1907; 118 years ago
- Renovated: 2008–2019
- Reopened: 2019

Tenants
- Estudiantes (LP) (1907–2005, 2019–present); Argentina national rugby team (2024–present); Estudiantes (LP) rugby (1912–30)

Website
- estudianteslp.com/estadio

The Estadio Jorge Luis Hirschi (Spanish pronunciation: [esˈtaðjo ˈxoɾxe lwis ˈiɾʃi]; lit. 'Jorge Luis Hirschi Stadium', named after Jorge Hirschi) is an association football stadium in La Plata, Argentina. Located in the Paseo del Bosque park, it is the home of Estudiantes (LP).

Because of its technological innovations and environmental sustainability, the stadium is regarded as one of the most modern venues in Argentina. The stadium is also one of the oldest in Argentina so it was established at Paseo del Bosque park in 1906.

It was formally inaugurated on 25 December 1907. The arena was the venue where Estudiantes obtained the 1913 amateur league title, and where fans enjoyed los profesores ("the professors"), the famous 1930s offensive line of Lauri-Scopelli-Zozaya-Ferreyra-Guayta.

In its initial incarnation (1907 to 2005) the stadium held up to 28,000 people, mostly standing-room, even though security measures would reduce its actual capacity to about 22,000. Its relatively meager size made Estudiantes use Boca Juniors' La Bombonera stadium for its Copa Libertadores games.

== History ==
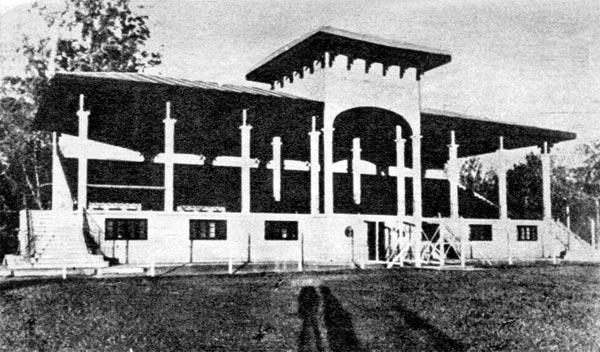
Official grandstand of the stadium in 1911

In 1906, the Estudiantes executives focused on building a venue that could be suitable for Primera División matches so it was required by the Argentine Football Association to admit club's registration with the body. It was because the original field on 19 and 51 avenues (where the Islas Malvinas Park is placed nowadays) was not in line with the requirements to host official matches. President of the club, Nazario Roberts, make the arrangements and the Government of Buenos Aires Province gave the club a land on 1 and 57 street, where a velodrome functioned. With a capacity for 2,000 spectators, the stadium was inaugurated on 25 December 1907.

After the pitch was remodelated, in 1911 a roofed grandstand was built. In 1937 a new lighting system was installed and the stadium became the first major venue in Argentina to host night games, inaugurated in a friendly match v Uruguayan side Peñarol. Those improvements allowed Estudiantes to participate in the Torneo Internacional Nocturno Rioplatense, a Summer tournament contested by Argentine and Uruguayan clubs.

The official grandstand, remodeled during the presidency of Pedro Osácar in the 1940s, was destroyed by fire in 1960 and then replaced by a roofed grandstand built entirely in concrete. It would be used until the venue's demolition in 2007.

=== Closure ===
In September 2005, the stadium was closed down for league games because of new safety regulations that forbid wooden stands. Even though a judicial restraining order exempted Estudiantes from the prohibition, the La Plata city government refused to comply. This situation started a rift between the club and mayor Julio Alak.

When Estadio Ciudad de La Plata was built for the city of La Plata, both Estudiantes and Gimnasia y Esgrima decided against relocating their home games. Immediately after the closure, Estudiantes requested permission for upgrading its stadium to no less than 20,000 seats plus 15,000 standing room, but the mayor refused, insisting that the new stadium should be used.

As a stopgap measure, for the 2005 Apertura Estudiantes played its home games in the nearby Gimnasia y Esgrima stadium, Estadio Juan Carmelo Zerillo, paying a rent of 10% gross income, plus an undisclosed amount for each attending season ticketholder. For the 2006 Clausura, Estudiantes moved its home games to the Quilmes A.C. venue, Estadio Centenario.

In April 2006, a new judicial order allowed the re-opening of 1 y 57, but Alak intervened again to avoid this from happening. At this point, Estudiantes management floated the idea of erecting a new stadium in the port town of Ensenada, a few kilometers east of La Plata.

=== Rebuilding ===
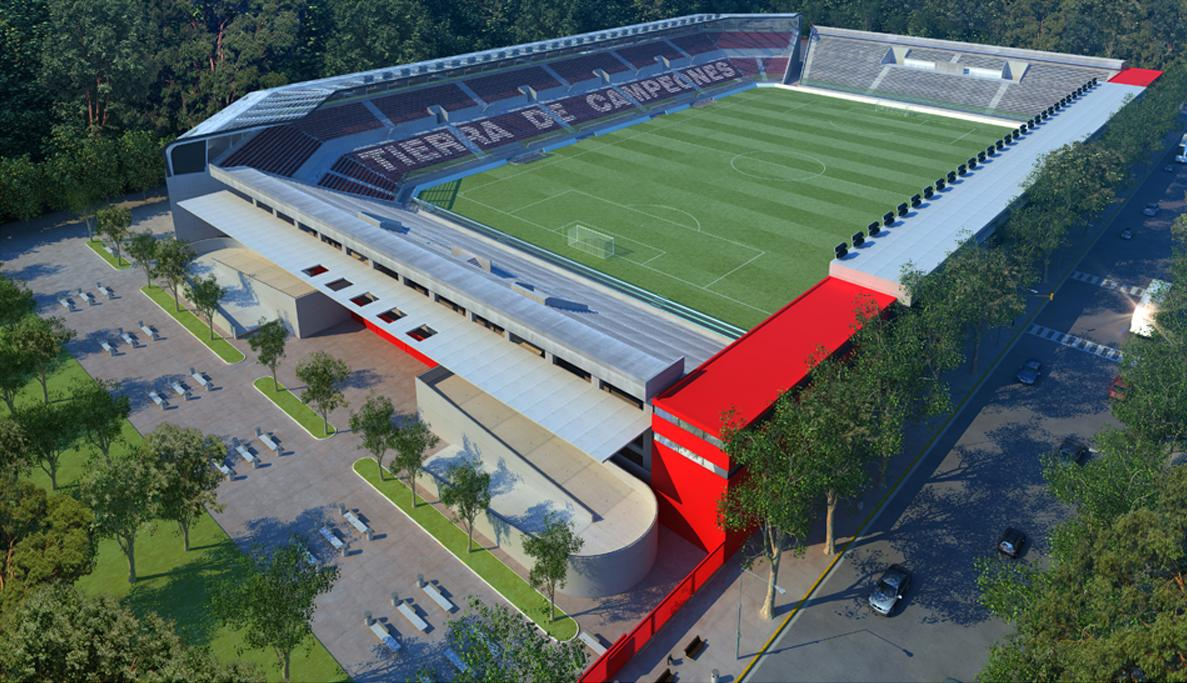
Project of the stadium represented in a scale model

In August 2006 it was reported that Estudiantes and the city of La Plata reached an agreement to rebuild the stands for a capacity of 20,000, all seated. The city stadium would be used for attendances exceeding that number. The eastern stands will feature the signage Tierra de Campeones (Land of Champions), which was used by fans since the 1960s to refer to 1 y 57.

Player Juan Sebastián Verón was instrumental in securing the new stadium agreement. Argentine journalists indicated that with this intervention (as well as a series of donations to upgrade the club's training facilities in City Bell) he is building his reputation towards a future bid for the club presidency, which in fact happened when Verón was elected president of the club in 2014.

On October 20, 2006, Estudiantes announced that, during the renovation work, it would use the city stadium for home games, as Coprosede (the football security authority) would not grant security clearance for Estudiantes to play home games at Estadio Centenario in Quilmes. Estudiantes fans also became less apprehensive about the city stadium after the historic 7–0 win over Gimnasia in October 2006, and the championship celebrations that took place in the stands, two months later.

Demolition works were completed during July 2007, after some delays caused by municipal red tape. Construction was scheduled to proceed smoothly, as the club had a budget surplus resulting from strong ticket sales and the proceedings from the transfers of José Ernesto Sosa and Mariano Pavone.

=== Reopening ===
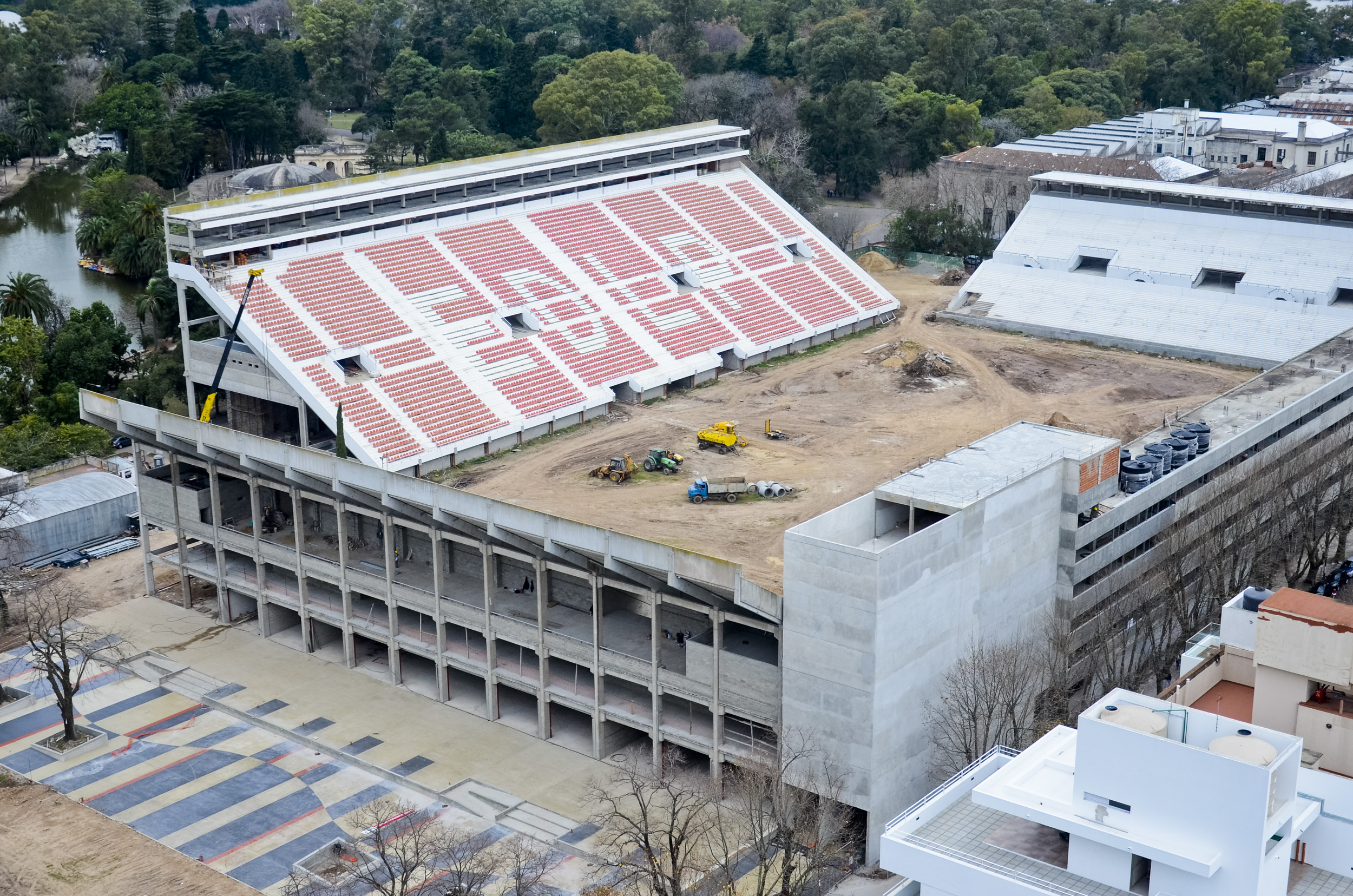
The stadium during its reconstruction in 2017

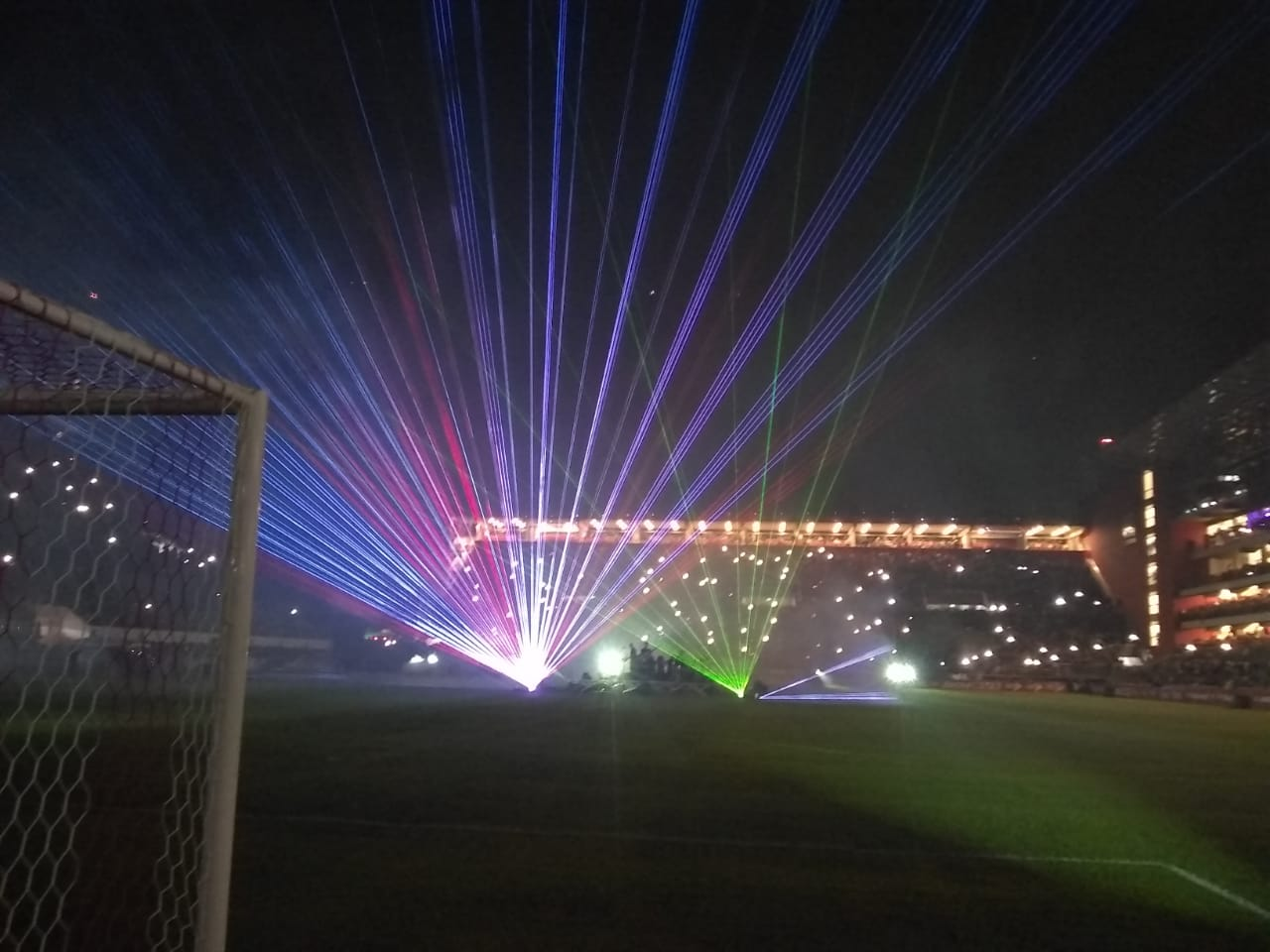
Inauguration of the stadium in November 2019

The stadium was expected to be re-opened for the 2019–20 season, which finally happened on 9 November 2019 with a big celebrations. The first official match after the reopening was on 30 November 2019 when Estudiantes played vs Atlético Tucumán (1–1 tie).

In April 2024, it was announced that the stadium would host one match of the Argentina national rugby union team during their participation in the 2024 Rugby Championship. Argentina played vs Australia, being the first time the national rugby team played in the venue. The stadium had hosted rugby matches since 1912, when Estudiantes registered with the Argentine Rugby Union. Rugby was a regular sport until 1930 when the department was closed.

== Stadium name ==
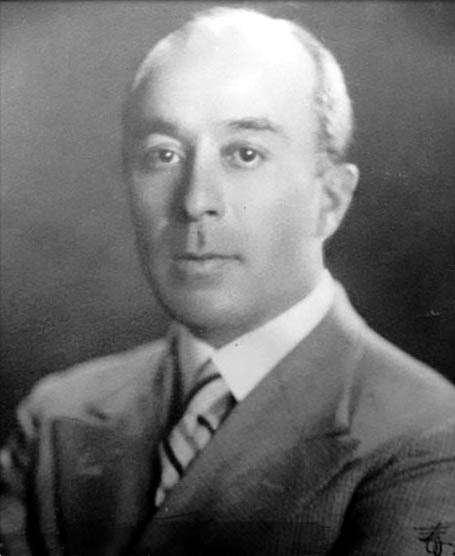
Jorge Hirschi, player and also major of La Plata in 1932. The stadium was named after him

The stadium was named after Jorge Hirschi (1889–1970), regarded as the most prominent figure in the history of the club. Hirsch was the n° 44 member of the club soon after it was founded in 1905. Hirschi was also player of the club at the same time he played rugby for Estudiantes during the time the club had a section for the practise of that sport.

Playing as right winger or centre forward, Hirsch was the topscorer of the team that promoted to Primera División in 1911. He played for Estudiantes until 1914 when he retired from football. By those times he got a degree in medicine, moving to La Pampa Province where he worked as doctor and then returning to his home town.

In 1927 Hirsch was elected president of Estudiantes, being in office until 1932. During his presidency, Estudiantes' number of members increased from 300 to 8,000. After leaving the presidency of the club, Hirsch started a political career, being major of La Plata during a brief period in 1932.

The stadium carries Hirsch's name since 1970 after an initiative by then president of the club Marianao Mangano. Although the club had proposed other names for the stadium during its reconstruction (such as "Tierra de Campeones" or "Osvaldo Zubeldía"), the stadium kept its original name.

== Rugby matches ==
Date	Home team	Score	Away team	Event	Ref.
31 Aug 2024	Argentina	19–20	Australia	2024 Rugby Championship	
5 Jul 2025	Argentina	12–35	England	England tour to America	

== Concerts ==
Since its reopening in 2019, the Jorge Luis Hirschi stadium has hosted the following concerts:

Date	Artist	Ref.
Nov 2022	Tini	
Dec 2022	Wos	
Dec 2023	Fito Páez	

== See also ==
- List of football stadiums in Argentina
- Lists of stadiums
