= Arthur Clark (rugby union) =

English rugby union player (born 2001)

- Born: 19 December 2001 (age 24) Oxford, England
- Height: 2.01 m (6 ft 7 in)
- Weight: 126 kg (19 st 12 lb; 278 lb)

Rugby union career
- Position: Lock
- Current team: Gloucester
Senior career
Years	Team	Apps	(Points)
2022–	Gloucester	45	(20)
2024	→ Harlequins (loan)	1	(0)
- Correct as of 4 Mar 2026
International career
Years	Team	Apps	(Points)
2021	England U20	5	(0)
2024–	England A	1	(0)
2025–	England	1	(0)
- Correct as of 19 July 2025

Arthur Clark (born 19 December 2001) is an English professional rugby union player who plays as a lock for Premiership Rugby club Gloucester and the England national team.

== Early life ==
His family own a farm at Todenham in the Cotswolds. He studied agricultural farming at Hartpury College. He played junior rugby with Stow-on-the-Wold, before joining the Gloucester academy. He was called up for the England U18s, although the COVID-19 pandemic forced the games to be cancelled.

== Club career ==
Playing for Gloucester, Clark made a try scoring first-team Premiership Rugby debut in a win over Worcester Warriors in September 2022. He proceeded to start against Bath Rugby a week later.

Clark captained Gloucester in the Premiership Rugby Cup at the start of the 2023–24 season and later in that competition came off the bench as they defeated Leicester Tigers in the final to lift the trophy. Clark had made 19 appearances in total for the club prior to signing for Harlequins on a short-term loan in January 2024. After making one appearance for Quins he returned to Gloucester and started in the 2023–24 EPCR Challenge Cup final at Tottenham Hotspur Stadium which saw them defeated by Sharks to finish runners up. He signed a contract extension with Gloucester in January 2025.

== International career ==
Clark played for the England U20 side in all five of their games during the 2021 Six Nations Under 20s Championship as they completed a junior grand slam at Cardiff Arms Park.

In February 2024 Clark was called up to train with the England A squad. Later that year in November 2024 he started in a victory over Australia A. In January 2025, following an injury to Alex Coles, Clark was called up to the senior England squad ahead of the opening game of the 2025 Six Nations Championship. However he fractured a bone on their last day of training ruling him out of participating in the tournament.

Clark was included in the squad for the 2025 England rugby union tour of Argentina and the United States. On 19 July 2025 he made his Test debut starting in their last fixture of the trip as they defeated USA in Washington.

== Personal life ==
His father Barry Clark was also a rugby union player who played for Gloucester in the 1980s.
