= Tom Curry (rugby union) =

British & Irish Lions & England international rugby union player

- Full name: Thomas Michael Curry
- Born: 15 June 1998 (age 28) Hounslow, England
- Height: 1.85 m (6 ft 1 in)
- Weight: 110 kg (243 lb; 17 st 5 lb)
- School: Bishop Heber High School; Oundle School
- Notable relative(s): Ben Curry (brother); John Olver (uncle); Sam Olver (cousin)

Rugby union career
- Position(s): Flanker, Number 8
- Current team: Sale Sharks
Senior career
Years	Team	Apps	(Points)
2016–	Sale Sharks	107	(35)
- Correct as of 19 January 2025
International career
Years	Team	Apps	(Points)
2016	England U18	8	(5)
2017	England U20	3	(5)
2017–	England	65	(30)
2021, 2025	British & Irish Lions	6	(10)
- Correct as of 2 August 2025
Medal record
Men's Rugby union
Representing England
Rugby World Cup
Silver medal – second place	2019 Japan	Squad
Bronze medal – third place	2023 France	Squad

Thomas Michael Curry (born 15 June 1998) is an English professional rugby union player who plays as a flanker for Premiership Rugby club Sale Sharks and the England national team.

== Club career ==
Curry played for Crewe & Nantwich in the early stages of his amateur career where he was coached by his father. Curry made his professional debut against Scarlets on 15 October 2016 in the European Champions Cup, becoming the fourth-youngest English player and youngest Sale Sharks player to have played in the competition. He scored on his Premiership Rugby debut on 30 October 2016, becoming the third-youngest scorer in the competition. At the end of the 2016-17 season, he was named a joint recipient of Sale Sharks' Young Player of the Season award, sharing the award with his brother Ben.

Curry played in the 2019–20 Premiership Rugby Cup final which saw Sale defeat Harlequins to lift the trophy. He captained Sale in their semi-final defeat to Exeter Chiefs during the 2020-21 season, his first league playoff appearance for the club. The following campaign saw Curry make eleven appearances for Sale including their Champion's Cup quarter final loss to Racing 92.

In the 2022-23 season, Curry scored a try in Sale's second round win over Bath Rugby. He then scored against defending champions Leicester Tigers at Welford Road in round five. Curry scored his first try in the Champions Cup during a 39-0 win against Ulster on 11 December 2022. At the end of that campaign he started in the 2023 Premiership final which they lost against Saracens to finish runners up.

In November 2023, Curry underwent a hip operation which ruled him out of the entire 2023-24 Premiership Rugby season, along with the 2024 Six Nations.

== International career ==
=== Youth ===
On 14 October 2016, Curry was named in the England U20 squad for the 2016–17 season, having previously represented England U18. Curry was part of the England U20 squad that won a Grand Slam in the 2017 Six Nations Under 20 Championship.

=== England ===
Curry was called up to the senior England squad by coach Eddie Jones for their 2017 summer tour of Argentina. In his first England appearance against the Barbarians on 28 May 2017 he was named Man of the Match. The match against the Barbarians was a 'non-test' fixture, so he did not receive an official cap. On 10 June 2017, Curry made his first capped appearance for England at flanker in the first test against Argentina. He became the youngest player to start at flanker for England, and the youngest England forward since 1912.

Curry was selected for the 2019 Six Nations Championship and started at number seven in all of England's games. He scored his first international try in an away defeat against Wales. Curry also scored a try during their last round draw with Scotland as England finished runners up. Later that year he was included in the squad for the 2019 Rugby World Cup and scored a try during a warm-up fixture against Ireland. He played in both the quarter-final win against Australia and semi-final victory over New Zealand. Curry started the final which England lost against South Africa to finish runners up.

Curry scored a try in the last round of the 2020 Six Nations Championship as England won away against Italy to win the tournament. Later that year he started in the final of the Autumn Nations Cup which saw England defeat France after extra time to lift the trophy. Curry was part of the squad for the November 2021 Autumn internationals. He was named as a vice captain for the test series, along with fellow squad members Courtney Lawes and Ellis Genge. Curry started the first match of the series, against Tonga, at Number 8. He went on to start both of England's victories over Australia and South Africa.

On 18 January 2022 Curry was named as part of Jones' 36 man squad for the 2022 Six Nations Championship. Curry was named to captain the side from openside flanker in the opening match at Murrayfield, becoming England's youngest captain since 1988. England lost the match 17-20. He also started in England's subsequent victories over Italy and Wales. He suffered a concussion against Wales and exited the game at half time but passed the return to play protocols and was declared fit to start against Ireland. Curry lasted only 14 minutes against Ireland before suffering a hamstring injury which also ruled him out for the final game of the tournament against France. England lost to Ireland and France, finishing the 2022 Six Nations in third place with only two victories.

In June 2022 Curry was named as part of the training squad for England's fixture against the Barbarians and subsequent tour to Australia. Curry was named as captain for the game against the Barbarians at Twickenham. England were beaten by the Barbarians 52-21, with the Barbarians spending the majority of the match with 14 men. He was named in their squad for the 2022 England rugby union tour of Australia. Curry started the first test match of the tour at openside flanker but suffered a concussion during the defeat and was replaced at half time. As a result of this he was ruled out of the rest of the series, which England would go on to win 2-1. On 26 September 2022 Curry was named as part of an England squad for a three-day training camp prior to England's end-of-year international fixtures. He started all four of England's test matches at openside flanker, receiving a yellow card in England's last match against South Africa.

On 7 August 2023, Curry was named as part of the England squad for the 2023 Rugby World Cup. In the opening Pool D match against Argentina, Curry became the first England player to be shown a red card in a Rugby World Cup. In the third minute of play he was shown a yellow card after making head-on-head contact with Juan Cruz Mallía, and this was subsequently upgraded to red under the ‘bunker’ review system. He was subsequently forced to miss England's next two pool matches, against Japan and Chile. Curry returned for the quarter-final victory over Fiji and semi-final defeat against champions South Africa. He also played in their last fixture of the tournament as England finished third.

In January 2025, Curry was named in the starting lineup alongside brother, Ben, for the first time at international level for the opening match of the 2025 Six Nations which saw him score a try in a defeat away to Ireland. He also scored a try during the penultimate round against Italy as England ultimately finished runners up.

=== British and Irish Lions ===
Curry was picked in the 37-man squad for the British & Irish Lions tour to South Africa in the summer of 2021. He made his debut for the Lions in the first of two tour matches against the Cell C Sharks. Three days later Curry appeared off the bench in the second match against the Sharks, scoring his only try of the tour. His last appearance before the test series was in the Lions' first loss of the tour against South Africa 'A'. Curry started all three tests against South Africa at openside flanker, with the hosts going on to win the series 2-1.

Curry was selected by coach Andy Farrell for the 2025 British & Irish Lions tour to Australia. He scored a try in the opening match of the Test series. Curry scored another try in the next game at Melbourne Cricket Ground which the Lions won to claim their first series win in twelve years. He also started in the last match of the tour as the Wallabies prevented a whitewash.

== Personal life ==
Curry is the twin brother of Sale Sharks flanker Ben Curry, son of Bishop Heber High School head teacher David Curry, nephew of former England hooker John Olver, and cousin of former Northampton Saints fly-half Sam Olver. John Olver also taught at Oundle School, where Curry was educated for sixth form.

In December 2024, Curry underwent stem-cell therapy treatment in response to recent injury record and as part of a wider strategy to be fit and available for the 2027 Rugby World Cup.

== Career statistics ==
=== List of international tries ===
As of 26 July 2025

England

Try	Opposing team	Location	Venue	Competition	Date	Result	Score
1	Wales	Cardiff, Wales	Millennium Stadium	2019 Six Nations	23 February 2019	Loss	21 - 13
2	Scotland	London, England	Twickenham Stadium	2019 Six Nations	16 March 2019	Draw	38 - 38
3	Ireland	London, England	Twickenham Stadium	2019 Rugby World Cup warm-up	24 August 2019	Win	57 - 15
4	Italy	Rome, Italy	Stadio Olimpico	2020 Six Nations	31 October 2020	Win	5 - 34
5	Ireland	Dublin, Ireland	Aviva Stadium	2025 Six Nations	1 February 2025	Loss	27 - 22
6	Italy	London, England	Twickenham Stadium	2025 Six Nations	9 March 2025	Win	47 - 24

British & Irish Lions

Try	Opposing team	Location	Venue	Competition	Date	Result	Score
1	Australia	Brisbane, Australia	Lang Park	2025 British & Irish Lions tour to Australia	19 July 2025	Win	19 – 27
2	Australia	Melbourne, Australia	Melbourne Cricket Ground	2025 British & Irish Lions tour to Australia	26 July 2025	Win	26 – 29

== Honours ==
England

- Six Nations Championship: 2020
- Autumn Nations Cup: 2020
- Rugby World Cup runner-up: 2019

Sale Sharks

- Premiership Rugby Cup: 2019–2020
- Premiership Rugby runner-up: 2022–2023
