= Theo Dan =

English rugby union player (born 2000)

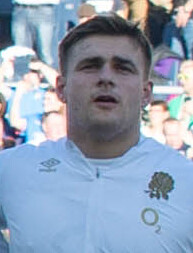
- Dan in 2024
- Full name: Theodor Dan
- Born: 26 December 2000 (age 25) London, England
- Height: 1.79 m (5 ft 10 in)
- Weight: 105 kg (231 lb; 16 st 7 lb)
- School: Alleyn's School
- University: King's College London

Rugby union career
- Position: Hooker
- Current team: Saracens
Youth career
- 2006–2017: Blackheath
- 2017–2019: Saracens
Senior career
| Years | Team | Apps | (Points) |
| 2019– | Saracens | 53 | (80) |
| 2019–2020 | → Bishop's Stortford (loan) | 9 | (5) |
| 2021–2022 | → Ampthill (loan) | 10 | (25) |
- Correct as of 19 January 2025
International career
| Years | Team | Apps | (Points) |
| 2020 | England U20 | 5 | (10) |
| 2023– | England | 20 | (15) |
- Correct as of 12 July 2025
Medal record
Men's Rugby union
Representing England
Rugby World Cup
| Bronze medal – third place | 2023 France | Squad |

Theodor Dan (born 26 December 2000) is an English professional rugby union player who plays as a hooker for Premiership Rugby club Saracens and the England national team.

== Early life ==
Dan was born in London, England on Boxing Day 2000, to Romanian parents Octavian and Diana. Growing up in Herne Hill – interspersed with visits to Bucharest and Târgu Jiu – he began his rugby journey when he was five years old, playing for Blackheath until the age of seventeen. He was educated at Alleyn's School and currently studies at King's College London for a bachelor's degree in philosophy, politics and economics.

During his youth, Dan played as a centre and wing, before being recruited into the academy at Saracens as a teenager. He credits his late grandfather Ion Dijmarescu, a professor of engineering who played as a tighthead prop in the Romanian first division, for instilling his love of the sport.

== Club career ==
Dan joined the Saracens junior academy in 2017, aged sixteen. While representing the club's U16s team at the Wellington Festival, he was persuaded to convert to hooker by Saracens academy coach and ex-player Kelly Brown. His transition to the front-row began with an apprenticeship loan spell at Old Alleynians. Dan describes Saracens first-team hooker and British & Irish Lions international Jamie George as a key mentor.

Dan represented the club in the Under-18 Academy League, before signing his first Saracens contract and graduating into the senior academy in June 2019. During his development, he spent time on loan at Bishop's Stortford in National League 1, the third tier of English rugby, playing under the tutelage of former Bath, Newcastle and Northampton player Andy Long.

In November 2021, Dan made his Saracens first-team debut in a victory over Harlequins in the pool stages of the 2021–22 Premiership Rugby Cup, and featured regularly in the Premiership Rugby Cup campaign, sometimes playing as a flanker. He was also dual-registered with Ampthill during the season and made several appearances for the club in the Championship, scoring one try His Premiership debut for Saracens followed at the end of the 2021–22 Premiership regular season, against Gloucester. Subsequently, Dan was promoted into the Saracens first-team squad ahead of the 2022–23 season.

After starting the 2022–23 season on loan at Ampthill, injuries saw Dan recalled to the Saracens first-team. Following his first Premiership start in October 2022, he enjoyed a breakthrough season, earning the most league starts at hooker for the club, and scoring five tries – the most of any Saracens forward that season. This culminated in Dan winning his first Premiership title on 27 May 2023, helping Saracens to victory in the final against Sale Sharks, as he played for 70 minutes after entering the match as an early replacement.

== International career ==
Dan is qualified to represent both England and Romania at international level. He has played for the England U18s, making his debut against France in March 2019. A year later, he scored two tries in four appearances for the England U20s during the abridged 2020 Six Nations.

On 30 June 2023, Dan received his first senior international call-up, when England head coach Steve Borthwick named him in the country's 41-man training squad, in preparation for the 2023 Rugby World Cup. On 5 August Dan made his Test debut coming on as a second-half substitute in a warm-up defeat to Wales at the Millennium Stadium. Two days later he was included in the squad for the World Cup.

Dan scored his first tries for England in their pool stage victory over Chile. He was an unused substitute for both the quarter-final victory over Fiji and semi-final elimination against champions South Africa. Dan scored a try in their last fixture of the tournament as England defeated Argentina to finish third with the Bronze medal.

His name made the announcement of the 17 players awarded Elite Player Squad (EPS) deals on the Rugby Football Union deals.

== Career statistics ==
=== List of international tries ===
as of 27 October 2023

| No. | Date | Venue | Opponent | Score | Result | Competition |
|---|---|---|---|---|---|---|
| 1 | 23 September 2023 | Stade Pierre-Mauroy, Lille, France | Chile | 10–0 | 71–0 | 2023 Rugby World Cup |
| 2 | 23 September 2023 | Stade Pierre-Mauroy, Lille, France | Chile | 36–0 | 71–0 | 2023 Rugby World Cup |
| 3 | 27 October 2023 | Stade de France, Saint-Denis, France | Argentina | 21–17 | 26–23 | 2023 Rugby World Cup |

== Honours ==
Saracens

- Premiership Rugby: 2022–23

England

- Rugby World Cup
  - (bronze) Third place: 2023
