= Steve Borthwick =

England international rugby union player and head coach

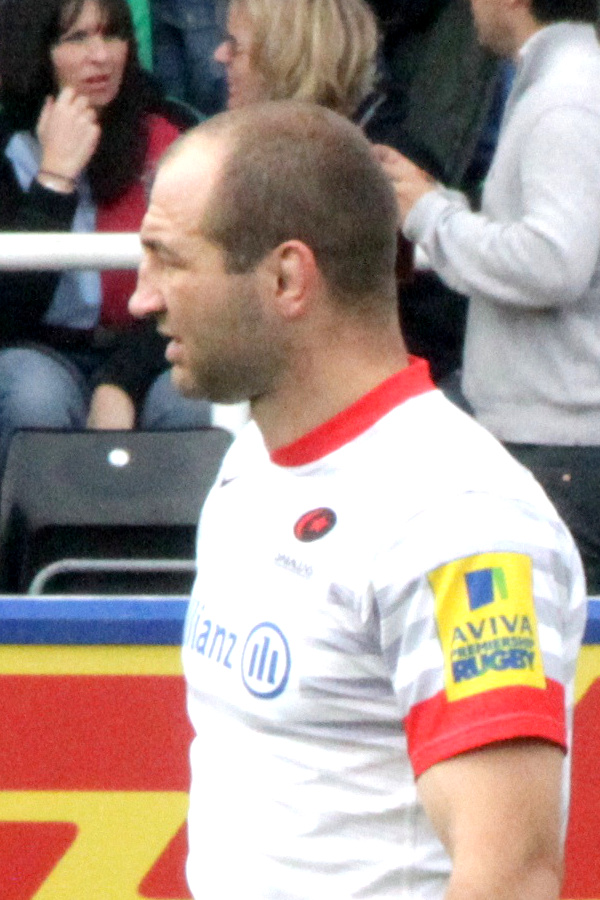
- Borthwick in 2012
- Born: Stephen William Borthwick; 12 October 1979 (age 47) Carlisle, England
- Height: 1.98 m (6 ft 6 in)
- Weight: 111 kg (245 lb; 17 st 7 lb)
- School: Hutton Grammar School
- University: University of Bath

Rugby union career
- Position: Lock
Youth career
- Preston Grasshoppers
Senior career
Years	Team	Apps	(Points)
1998–2008	Bath	246	(45)
2008–2014	Saracens	144	(15)
International career
Years	Team	Apps	(Points)
2001–2010	England	57	(10)
Coaching career
- Years: Team
- 2012–2015: Japan (assistant)
- 2015: Bristol (forwards)
- 2015–2020: England (forwards)
- 2020–2022: Leicester Tigers
- 2022–: England

Stephen William Borthwick (born 12 October 1979) is an English rugby union coach and former player, who is currently the head coach of the England national team. As a player, he played as a lock for Bath and Saracens. At international level, he played for England 57 times from his debut in 2001; he served as captain from 2008, until he was dropped from the side in 2010.

Borthwick was appointed as England's forwards coach in December 2015, a role which he left in mid 2020 to become head coach of Leicester Tigers instead. In December 2022, he was appointed as the England head coach.

== Club career ==
Born in Carlisle, Cumbria, Borthwick was captain of the Hutton Grammar School rugby team, with whom he went on a tour to Australia, and captained to the semi finals of the Daily Mail Cup in 1998.

=== Bath: 1998–2008 ===
Borthwick joined Bath in 1998 from Preston Grasshoppers, making his debut against Saracens in December 1998. During this time, he was balancing rugby commitments with study, and graduated from the University of Bath in 2003 with a degree in economics with politics.

Borthwick had, arguably, his best season for Bath in the 2003–04 season. A central figure in the absence of many senior players due to the 2003 Rugby World Cup, he set about making his mark on the English Premiership. Bath made the League Final that season, losing to London Wasps. He was one of the three nominees for the Premiership Player of the Year award. In his final game with the club, Borthwick captained Bath to victory in the 2007–08 European Challenge Cup.

In January 2008, Borthwick announced that he would be leaving Bath at the end of the 2007–08 season for Saracens.

=== Saracens: 2008–2014 ===
Following his switch to Saracens, Borthwick was named co-captain for the 2008–09 season, alongside Andy Farrell.

In the 2009–10 season, he was named as the club captain. Injury prevented him from playing for much of the season – he returned for the Premiership final, but not as captain, as Saracens were defeated by Leicester Tigers. However, in the 2010–11 season, he started the final – a rematch against the Tigers – as Saracens won their first Premiership title.

On 28 November 2013, Borthwick announced he would be retiring at the end of the 2013–14 season.

== International career ==
Borthwick first emerged during England's 2000 tour of South Africa. Despite his presence in the line-out, he was not considered heavy enough for international rugby, but later bulked out. A regular choice as the England A team captain, from his debut against Wales A at Wrexham in February 2001, he had already played on the full tour of South Africa the previous summer. Borthwick made his debut for England against France in the 2001 Six Nations. Injury prevented him from being considered for the 2002 trip to Argentina.

He came on as a blood replacement for Ben Kay in the 25–14 win over Australia in Melbourne in June 2003, his sixth cap. A member of England's wider 2003 World Cup squad, he narrowly missed selection to the final 30. He regained his place in the England squad after the 2003 World Cup and despite England's disappointing results, Borthwick was given credit for his solid play.

Borthwick initially failed to make England's squad for the 2005 Autumn internationals, with Gloucester forward Alex Brown seemingly poised for a start instead, but injury ruled Brown out of contention and Borthwick stepped in, playing a significant role against Australia, New Zealand and Samoa.

Borthwick was selected as a member of England's 2007 Rugby World Cup squad. He played in three pool stage matches, starting against Tonga. He did not participate in the knockout games.

=== Captaincy ===
On 10 February 2008, Borthwick was named captain for England's 2008 Six Nations match against Italy in Rome, and on 13 May 2008, he was chosen to captain the full England squad on their 2008 summer tour of New Zealand. In October 2008, he was named as Martin Johnson's first England captain for the 2008 Autumn Internationals. Borthwick came in for a lot of criticism after England's disappointing 2008 Autumn Internationals in which they suffered heavy defeats to New Zealand and South Africa. However, Johnson kept faith in him.

In the 2009 Six Nations, Borthwick came under more criticism as England's discipline cost them victories against Ireland and Wales. However, after performing much better against France and Scotland in the last two weeks of the tournament, Borthwick's critics seemed to leave him alone.

=== End of international career ===
In January 2010, Borthwick was confirmed as England captain for the 2010 Six Nations. After England's 15–15 draw against Scotland in the 2010 Six Nations, Borthwick aggravated an ongoing knee injury. This meant he was unavailable for selection against France, so Tom Palmer was bought in as cover and Lewis Moody was given the captaincy.

Due to injury, Borthwick was not a member of the 2010 England rugby union tour of Australasia. On 1 July 2010, he was dropped from the Elite Player Squad by Martin Johnson.

== Coaching career ==
Borthwick trained as a coach whilst playing with Saracens, taking his initial position at the club's academy from 2012, and also attending the University of Hertfordshire. From 2012, he was forwards coach alongside Eddie Jones for Japan up to and including the 2015 Rugby World Cup, after which he was confirmed as forwards coach for Bristol, under former Bath colleague Andy Robinson.

On 15 December 2015, he was confirmed as the new England forwards coach.

In October 2019, it was reported that Borthwick's next role would be with Leicester Tigers following the 2019 Rugby World Cup. It was later confirmed he would join the club as head coach for the 2020–21 season. Borthwick led the Tigers to their eleventh Premiership title during the 2021–22 season.

On 19 December 2022, it was announced that Borthwick would take over as head coach of the England men's rugby team, replacing Eddie Jones. In September 2026, his contract with England was extended by the RFU beyond the 2028 Six Nations Championship to avoid speculation over his future both before and during the 2027 Rugby World Cup.

== International coaching statistics ==
As of 21 November 2026

Team	Years	Played	Won	Drawn	Lost	Win %	For	Against
England	2023–present	51	31	0	20	60.78	1,558	1,105

=== International matches as head coach ===
Matches (2023–present)
Match	Date	Opposition	Venue	Score (Eng.–Opponent)	Competition	Captain
2023
1	4 February	Scotland	Twickenham, London, England	23–29	Six Nations Championship	Owen Farrell
2	12 February	Italy	Twickenham, London, England	31–14	Six Nations Championship	Owen Farrell
3	25 February	Wales	Millennium Stadium, Cardiff, Wales	20–10	Six Nations Championship	Owen Farrell
4	11 March	France	Twickenham, London, England	10–53	Six Nations Championship	Ellis Genge
5	18 March	Ireland	Aviva Stadium, Dublin, Ireland	16–29	Six Nations Championship	Owen Farrell
6	5 August	Wales	Millennium Stadium, Cardiff, Wales	9–20	Rugby World Cup warm-ups	Ellis Genge
7	12 August	Wales	Twickenham, London, England	19–17	Rugby World Cup warm-ups	Owen Farrell
8	19 August	Ireland	Aviva Stadium, Dublin, Ireland	10–29	Rugby World Cup warm-ups	Courtney Lawes
9	26 August	Fiji	Twickenham, London, England	22–30	Rugby World Cup warm-ups	Courtney Lawes
10	9 September	Argentina	Stade Vélodrome, Marseille, France	27–10	Rugby World Cup pool stage	Courtney Lawes
11	17 September	Japan	Allianz Riviera, Nice, France	34–12	Rugby World Cup pool stage	Courtney Lawes
12	23 September	Chile	Stade Pierre-Mauroy, Villeneuve-d'Ascq, France	71–0	Rugby World Cup pool stage	Owen Farrell
13	7 October	Samoa	Stade Pierre-Mauroy, Villeneuve-d'Ascq, France	18–17	Rugby World Cup pool stage	Owen Farrell
14	15 October	Fiji	Stade Vélodrome, Marseille, France	30–24	Rugby World Cup knockout stage	Owen Farrell
15	21 October	South Africa	Stade de France, Saint-Denis, France	15–16	Rugby World Cup knockout stage	Owen Farrell
16	27 October	Argentina	Stade de France, Saint-Denis, France	26–23	Rugby World Cup knockout stage	Owen Farrell
2024
17	3 February	Italy	Stadio Olimpico, Rome, Italy	27–24	Six Nations Championship	Jamie George
18	10 February	Wales	Twickenham, London, England	16–14	Six Nations Championship	Jamie George
19	24 February	Scotland	Murrayfield, Edinburgh, Scotland	21–30	Six Nations Championship	Jamie George
20	9 March	Ireland	Twickenham, London, England	23–22	Six Nations Championship	Jamie George
21	16 March	France	Parc Olympique Lyonnais, Décines-Charpieu, France	31–33	Six Nations Championship	Jamie George
22	22 June	Japan	National Stadium, Tokyo, Japan	52–17	Summer tour of Japan and New Zealand	Jamie George
23	6 July	New Zealand	Forsyth Barr Stadium, Dunedin, New Zealand	15–16	Summer tour of Japan and New Zealand	Jamie George
24	13 July	New Zealand	Eden Park, Auckland, New Zealand	17–24	Summer tour of Japan and New Zealand	Jamie George
25	2 November	New Zealand	Twickenham, London, England	22–24	Autumn Nations Series	Jamie George
26	9 November	Australia	Twickenham, London, England	37–42	Autumn Nations Series	Jamie George
27	16 November	South Africa	Twickenham, London, England	20–29	Autumn Nations Series	Jamie George
28	24 November	Japan	Twickenham, London, England	59–14	Autumn Nations Series	Jamie George
2025
29	1 February	Ireland	Aviva Stadium, Dublin, Ireland	22–27	Six Nations Championship	Maro Itoje
30	8 February	France	Twickenham, London, England	26–25	Six Nations Championship	Maro Itoje
31	22 February	Scotland	Twickenham, London, England	16–15	Six Nations Championship	Maro Itoje
32	8 March	Italy	Twickenham, London, England	47–24	Six Nations Championship	Maro Itoje
33	15 March	Wales	Millennium Stadium, Cardiff, Wales	68–14	Six Nations Championship	Maro Itoje
34	5 July	Argentina	Estadio Jorge Luis Hirschi, La Plata, Argentina	35–12	Summer tour of Argentina and USA	Jamie George / George Ford
35	12 July	Argentina	Estadio Bicentenario, San Juan, Argentina	22–17	Summer tour of Argentina and USA	George Ford
36	19 July	United States	Audi Field, Washington DC, United States	40–5	Summer tour of Argentina and USA	George Ford
37	1 November	Australia	Twickenham, London, England	25–7	Autumn Nations Series	Maro Itoje
38	8 November	Fiji	Twickenham, London, England	38–18	Autumn Nations Series	Ellis Genge
39	15 November	New Zealand	Twickenham, London, England	33–19	Autumn Nations Series	Maro Itoje
40	23 November	Argentina	Twickenham, London, England	27–23	Autumn Nations Series	Maro Itoje
2026
41	7 February	Wales	Twickenham, London, England	48–7	Six Nations Championship	Jamie George
42	14 February	Scotland	Murrayfield, Edinburgh, Scotland	20–31	Six Nations Championship	Maro Itoje
43	21 February	Ireland	Twickenham, London, England	21–42	Six Nations Championship	Maro Itoje
44	7 March	Italy	Stadio Olimpico, Rome, Italy	18–23	Six Nations Championship	Maro Itoje
45	14 March	France	Stade de France, Saint-Denis, France	46–48	Six Nations Championship	Maro Itoje
46	4 July	South Africa	Ellis Park, Johannesburg, South Africa	21–45	Nations Championship	Jamie George
47	11 July	Fiji	Hill Dickinson Stadium, Liverpool, England	73–8	Nations Championship	Jamie George
48	18 July	Argentina	Estadio Único Madre de Ciudades, Santiago del Estero, Argentina	31–24	Nations Championship	Jamie George
49	8 November	Australia	Twickenham, London, England	45–22	Nations Championship	Maro Itoje
50	14 November	Japan	Twickenham, London, England	78–15	Nations Championship	Maro Itoje
51	21 November	New Zealand	Twickenham, London, England	37–12	Nations Championship	Maro Itoje

== Personal life ==
Borthwick is married to Beth Borthwick, an Australian. They have two sons together.

Borthwick supports Preston North End.

Sporting positions
Preceded by Phil Vickery; Phil Vickery	England national rugby union team captain Feb 2008; Jun 2008 – Mar 2010	Succeeded by Phil Vickery; Lewis Moody
Preceded by (South Africa) Neil de Kock	Saracens captain 2008–2014	Succeeded by (South Africa) Alistair Hargreaves
Preceded by (Australia) Eddie Jones	England national rugby union team head coach 2022–	Succeeded by Incumbent
