= 2027 Men's Rugby World Cup Pool B =

Pool B of the 2027 Men's Rugby World Cup will begin on Sunday 3 October and conclude on Sunday 17 October. The pool includes current champions South Africa alongside European sides Georgia, Italy and Romania.

== Teams ==
The draw for the pool stage was held on 3 December 2025 in Sydney. The World Rugby Rankings as of 1 December 2025 determined four bands of six teams, and a team from each band was randomly drawn into Pool A, B, C, D, E or F. Australia was the only exception, having been automatically placed into Pool A as hosts.

Pos.	Team	Band	Confederation	Method of qualification	Date of qualification	Apps.	Last	Previous best performance	World Rugby Rankings	
Pos.	Team	Band	Confederation	Method of qualification	Date of qualification	Apps.	Last	Previous best performance	1 December 2025 (Note: The final rankings as of 1 December 2025 were used for the draw.)	27 September 2027 (Note: The final rankings before the first match of the tournament.)
B1	South Africa	1	Africa	2023 Rugby World Cup pool stage	1 October 2023	9	2023	Champions (1995, 2007, 2019, 2023)	1	
B2	Italy	2	Europe	2023 Rugby World Cup pool stage	5 October 2023	11	2023	Pool stage (10 times)	10	
B3	Georgia	3	Europe	2025 Rugby Europe Championship winner	9 February 2025	7	2023	Pool stage (6 times)	13	
B4	Romania	4	Europe	2025 Rugby Europe Championship third place	9 February 2025	10	2023	Pool stage (9 times)	22	

== Standings ==
Pos	Team	Pld	W	D	L	PF	PA	PD	TF	TA	TB	LB	Pts	Qualification
1	South Africa	0	0	0	0	0	0	0	0	0	0	0	0	Advance to knockout stage
2	Italy	0	0	0	0	0	0	0	0	0	0	0	0	Advance to knockout stage
3	Georgia	0	0	0	0	0	0	0	0	0	0	0	0	Possible knockout stage based on ranking
4	Romania	0	0	0	0	0	0	0	0	0	0	0	0	

First match(es) will be played: 3 October 2027. Source: World Rugby
Rules for classification: Pool stage tiebreakers

== Matches ==
=== South Africa v Italy ===
3 October 2027
14:15 ACDT (UTC+10:30)

South Africa	v	Italy

Adelaide Oval, Adelaide

=== Georgia v Romania ===
3 October 2027
20:15 AEST (UTC+10)

Georgia	v	Romania

North Queensland Stadium, Townsville

=== South Africa v Georgia ===
10 October 2027
16:45 AEST (UTC+10)

South Africa	v	Georgia

Brisbane Stadium, Brisbane

=== Italy v Romania ===
11 October 2027
19:45 AEDT (UTC+11)

Italy	v	Romania

Sydney Football Stadium, Sydney

=== Italy v Georgia ===
17 October 2027
12:15 AEDT (UTC+11)

Italy	v	Georgia

Newcastle Stadium, Newcastle

=== South Africa v Romania ===
17 October 2027
19:15 AWST (UTC+08)

South Africa	v	Romania

Perth Stadium, Perth

== See also ==
- History of rugby union matches between Italy and South Africa
- History of rugby union matches between Georgia and Romania
