= 2027 Men's Rugby World Cup Pool C =

Pool C of the 2027 Men's Rugby World Cup will begin on Monday 4 October and conclude on Saturday 16 October. The pool includes Argentina, Canada, Fiji and Spain.

== Teams ==
The draw for the pool stage was held on 3 December 2025 in Sydney. The World Rugby Rankings as of 1 December 2025 determined four bands of six teams, and a team from each band was randomly drawn into Pool A, B, C, D, E or F. Australia was the only exception, having been automatically placed into Pool A as hosts.

Pos.	Team	Band	Confederation	Method of qualification	Date of qualification	Apps.	Last	Previous best performance	World Rugby Rankings	
Pos.	Team	Band	Confederation	Method of qualification	Date of qualification	Apps.	Last	Previous best performance	1 December 2025 (Note: The final rankings as of 1 December 2025 were used for the draw.)	27 September 2027 (Note: The final rankings before the first match of the tournament.)
C1	Argentina	1	South America	2023 Rugby World Cup pool stage	7 October 2023	11	2023	Third place (2007)	6	
C2	Fiji	2	Pacific (Oceania)	2023 Rugby World Cup pool stage	1 October 2023	10	2023	Quarter-finals (1987, 2007, 2023)	8	
C3	Spain	3	Europe	2025 Rugby Europe Championship runners-up	9 February 2025	2	1999	Pool stage (1999)	15	
C4	Canada	4	Pacific (North America)	2025 Pacific Nations Cup fourth place	6 September 2025	10	2019	Quarter-finals (1991)	25	

== Standings ==
Pos	Team	Pld	W	D	L	PF	PA	PD	TF	TA	TB	LB	Pts	Qualification
1	Argentina	0	0	0	0	0	0	0	0	0	0	0	0	Advance to knockout stage
2	Fiji	0	0	0	0	0	0	0	0	0	0	0	0	Advance to knockout stage
3	Spain	0	0	0	0	0	0	0	0	0	0	0	0	Possible knockout stage based on ranking
4	Canada	0	0	0	0	0	0	0	0	0	0	0	0	

First match(es) will be played: 4 October 2027. Source: World Rugby
Rules for classification: Pool stage tiebreakers

== Matches ==
=== Fiji v Spain ===
4 October 2027
14:15 AEDT (UTC+11)

Fiji	v	Spain

Newcastle Stadium, Newcastle

=== Argentina v Canada ===
4 October 2027
18:45 AEST (UTC+10)

Argentina	v	Canada

Brisbane Stadium, Brisbane

=== Fiji v Canada ===
10 October 2027
12:15 ACDT (UTC+10:30)

Fiji	v	Canada

Adelaide Oval, Adelaide

=== Argentina v Spain ===
10 October 2027
15:15 AEDT (UTC+11)

Argentina	v	Spain

Docklands Stadium, Melbourne

=== Argentina v Fiji ===
16 October 2027
13:15 ACDT (UTC+10:30)

Argentina	v	Fiji

Adelaide Oval, Adelaide

=== Spain v Canada ===
16 October 2027
20:15 AEST (UTC+10)

Spain	v	Canada

North Queensland Stadium, Townsville
