= 2027 Men's Rugby World Cup Pool D =

Pool D of the 2027 Men's Rugby World Cup will begin on Sunday 3 October and conclude on Sunday 17 October. The pool includes Ireland, Scotland, Uruguay, and Portugal.

== Teams ==
The draw for the pool stage was held on 3 December 2025 in Sydney. The World Rugby Rankings as of 1 December 2025 determined four bands of six teams, and a team from each band was randomly drawn into Pool A, B, C, D, E or F. Australia was the only exception, having been automatically placed into Pool A as hosts.

Pos.	Team	Band	Confederation	Method of qualification	Date of qualification	Apps.	Last	Previous best performance	World Rugby Rankings	
Pos.	Team	Band	Confederation	Method of qualification	Date of qualification	Apps.	Last	Previous best performance	1 December 2025 (Note: The final rankings as of 1 December 2025 were used for the draw.)	27 September 2027 (Note: The final rankings before the first match of the tournament.)
D1	Ireland	1	Europe	2023 Rugby World Cup pool stage	23 September 2023	11	2023	Quarter-finals (8 times)	4	
D2	Scotland	2	Europe	2023 Rugby World Cup pool stage	1 October 2023	11	2023	Fourth place (1991)	9	
D3	Uruguay	3	South America	Sudamérica play-off winner	6 September 2025	5	2023	Pool stage (5 times)	14	
D4	Portugal	4	Europe	2025 Rugby Europe Championship fourth place	9 February 2025	3	2023	Pool stage (2007, 2023)	20	

== Standings ==
Pos	Team	Pld	W	D	L	PF	PA	PD	TF	TA	TB	LB	Pts	Qualification
1	Ireland	0	0	0	0	0	0	0	0	0	0	0	0	Advance to knockout stage
2	Scotland	0	0	0	0	0	0	0	0	0	0	0	0	Advance to knockout stage
3	Uruguay	0	0	0	0	0	0	0	0	0	0	0	0	Possible knockout stage based on ranking
4	Portugal	0	0	0	0	0	0	0	0	0	0	0	0	

First match(es) will be played: 3 October 2027. Source: World Rugby
Rules for classification: Pool stage tiebreakers

== Matches ==
=== Scotland v Uruguay ===
3 October 2027
17:15 AEDT (UTC+11)

Scotland	v	Uruguay

Docklands Stadium, Melbourne

=== Ireland v Portugal ===
4 October 2027
17:15 AEDT (UTC+11)

Ireland	v	Portugal

Sydney Football Stadium, Sydney

=== Ireland v Scotland ===
10 October 2027
17:45 AWST (UTC+08)

Ireland	v	Scotland

Perth Stadium, Perth

Notes:

- This is the third tournament in a row and the fourth overall where Ireland and Scotland have been drawn into the same pool.

=== Uruguay v Portugal ===
11 October 2027
17:15 AEDT (UTC+11)

Uruguay	v	Portugal

Newcastle Stadium, Newcastle

=== Ireland v Uruguay ===
17 October 2027
14:45 AEDT (UTC+11)

Ireland	v	Uruguay

Docklands Stadium, Melbourne

Notes:

- This is the first meeting between Ireland and Uruguay.

=== Scotland v Portugal ===
17 October 2027
16:15 AEST (UTC+10)

Scotland	v	Portugal

Brisbane Stadium, Brisbane

== See also ==
- History of rugby union matches between Ireland and Scotland
