= 2027 Men's Rugby World Cup Pool E =

Pool E of the 2027 Men's Rugby World Cup will begin on Saturday 2 October and conclude on Sunday 17 October. The pool includes France, Japan, Samoa and the United States.

== Teams ==
The draw for the pool stage will be held on 3 December 2025 in Sydney. The World Rugby Rankings as of 1 December 2025 will determine four bands of six teams, and a team from each band will be randomly drawn into Pool A, B, C, D, E or F. Australia is the only exception, having been automatically placed into Pool A as hosts.

Pos.	Team	Band	Confederation	Method of qualification	Date of qualification	Apps.	Last	Previous best performance	World Rugby Rankings	
Pos.	Team	Band	Confederation	Method of qualification	Date of qualification	Apps.	Last	Previous best performance	1 December 2025 (Note: The final rankings as of 1 December 2025 were used for the draw.)	27 September 2027 (Note: The final rankings before the first match of the tournament.)
E1	France	1	Europe	2023 Rugby World Cup pool stage	21 September 2023	11	2023	Runners-up (1987, 1999, 2011)	5	
E2	Japan	2	Pacific (Asia)	2023 Rugby World Cup pool stage	7 October 2023	11	2023	Quarter-finals (2019)	12	
E3	United States	3	Pacific (North America)	2025 Pacific Nations Cup fifth place	14 September 2025	9	2019	Pool stage (8 times)	16	
E4	Samoa	4	Pacific (Oceania)	Final Qualification Tournament	18 November 2025	10	2023	Quarter-finals (1991, 1995)	19	

== Standings ==
Pos	Team	Pld	W	D	L	PF	PA	PD	TF	TA	TB	LB	Pts	Qualification
1	France	0	0	0	0	0	0	0	0	0	0	0	0	Advance to knockout stage
2	Japan	0	0	0	0	0	0	0	0	0	0	0	0	Advance to knockout stage
3	United States	0	0	0	0	0	0	0	0	0	0	0	0	Possible knockout stage based on ranking
4	Samoa	0	0	0	0	0	0	0	0	0	0	0	0	

First match(es) will be played: 2 October 2027. Source: World Rugby
Rules for classification: Pool stage tiebreakers

== Matches ==
=== France v United States ===
2 October 2027
17:45 AEST (UTC+10)

France	v	United States

Docklands Stadium, Melbourne

=== Japan v Samoa ===
3 October 2027
12:15 AEDT (UTC+11)

Japan	v	Samoa

Newcastle Stadium, Newcastle

=== United States v Samoa ===
9 October 2027
12:15 AWST (UTC+08)

United States	v	Samoa

Perth Stadium, Perth

=== France v Japan ===
9 October 2027
18:45 AEST (UTC+10)

France	v	Japan

Brisbane Stadium, Brisbane

=== Japan v United States ===
15 October 2027
20:00 ACDT (UTC+10:30)

Japan	v	United States

Adelaide Oval, Adelaide

=== France v Samoa ===
17 October 2027
19:45 AEDT (UTC+11)

France	v	Samoa

Sydney Football Stadium, Sydney
