= 2027 Men's Rugby World Cup Pool F =

Pool F of the 2027 Men's Rugby World Cup will begin on Saturday 2 October and conclude on Saturday 16 October. The pool includes one-time champion England, along with Tonga, Wales and Zimbabwe.

== Teams ==
The draw for the pool stage will be held on 3 December 2025 in Sydney. The World Rugby Rankings as of 1 December 2025 will determine four bands of six teams, and a team from each band will be randomly drawn into Pool A, B, C, D, E or F. Australia is the only exception, having been automatically placed into Pool A as hosts.

Pos.	Team	Band	Confederation	Method of qualification	Date of qualification	Apps.	Last	Previous best performance	World Rugby Rankings	
Pos.	Team	Band	Confederation	Method of qualification	Date of qualification	Apps.	Last	Previous best performance	1 December 2025 (Note: The final rankings as of 1 December 2025 were used for the draw.)	27 September 2027 (Note: The final rankings before the first match of the tournament.)
F1	England	1	Europe	2023 Rugby World Cup pool stage	7 October 2023	11	2023	Champions (2003)	3	
F2	Wales	2	Europe	2023 Rugby World Cup pool stage	24 September 2023	11	2023	Third place (1987)	11	
F3	Tonga	3	Pacific (Oceania)	2025 Pacific Nations Cup third place	6 September 2025	10	2023	Pool stage (9 times)	18	
F4	Zimbabwe	4	Africa	2025 Rugby Africa Cup winners	19 July 2025	3	1991	Pool stage (1987, 1991)	24	

== Standings ==
Pos	Team	Pld	W	D	L	PF	PA	PD	TF	TA	TB	LB	Pts	Qualification
1	England	0	0	0	0	0	0	0	0	0	0	0	0	Advance to knockout stage
2	Wales	0	0	0	0	0	0	0	0	0	0	0	0	Advance to knockout stage
3	Tonga	0	0	0	0	0	0	0	0	0	0	0	0	Possible knockout stage based on ranking
4	Zimbabwe	0	0	0	0	0	0	0	0	0	0	0	0	

First match(es) will be played: 2 October 2027. Source: World Rugby
Rules for classification: Pool stage tiebreakers

== Matches ==
=== Wales v Zimbabwe ===
2 October 2027
12:15 ACST (UTC+9:30)

Wales	v	Zimbabwe

Adelaide Oval, Adelaide

=== England v Tonga ===
2 October 2027
20:15 AEST (UTC+10)

England	v	Tonga

Brisbane Stadium, Brisbane

=== Wales v Tonga ===
8 October 2027
18:15 AEDT (UTC+11)

Wales	v	Tonga

Docklands Stadium, Melbourne

=== England v Zimbabwe ===
8 October 2027
20:15 ACDT (UTC+10:30)

England	v	Zimbabwe

Adelaide Oval, Adelaide

Notes:

- This is the first meeting between England and Zimbabwe.

=== Tonga v Zimbabwe ===
15 October 2027
20:15 AEST (UTC+10)

Tonga	v	Zimbabwe

North Queensland Stadium, Townsville

=== England v Wales ===
16 October 2027
19:45 AEDT (UTC+11)

England	v	Wales

Stadium Australia, Sydney

== See also ==
- History of rugby union matches between England and Wales
