= Newcastle International Sports Centre =

Sports stadium in Newcastle, Australia

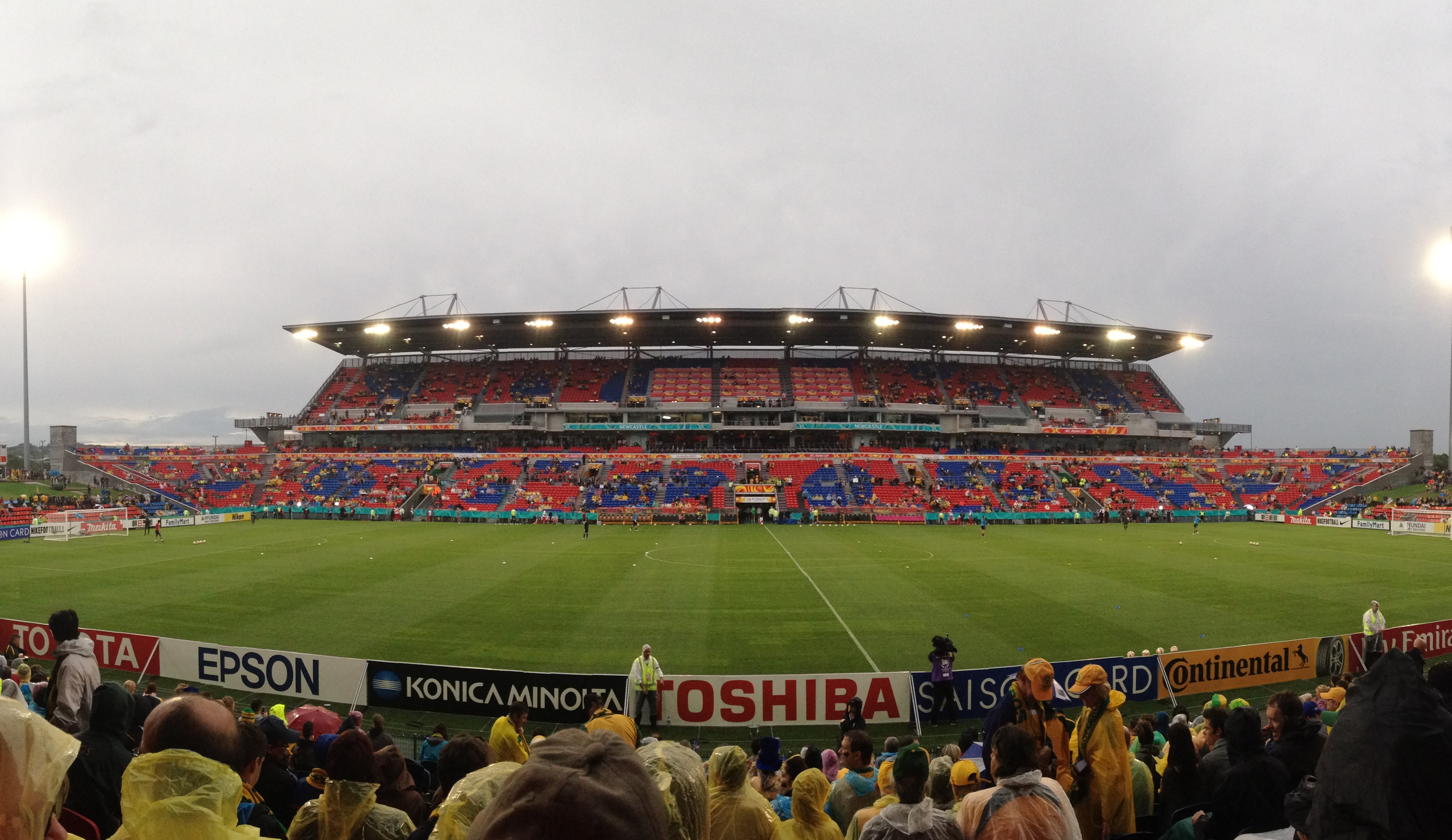
- Interactive map of Newcastle International Sports Centre
- Full name: Hunter International Sports Centre
- Former names: International Sports Centre (1970–91); Marathon Stadium (1992–2001); EnergyAustralia Stadium (2001–10); Ausgrid Stadium (2011); Hunter Stadium (2012–16)
- Location: New Lambton, Newcastle, New South Wales, Australia
- Coordinates: 32°55′08″S 151°43′36″E
- Owner: Government of New South Wales
- Operator: Venues NSW
- Capacity: 33,000 (23,000 seated)
- Type: Stadium
- Event: Sporting events
- Surface: Grass
- Record attendance: 42,000 (1990, 1989 Newcastle earthquake relief concert)
- Public transit: Broadmeadow; Special event Buses

Construction
- Groundbreaking: 1967
- Opened: 10 April 1970
- Renovated: 2003–05, 2008–11

Tenants
- Newcastle KB United (NSL) (1977–1984); Newcastle Knights (NRL) (1988–present); Hunter Eagles (ABL) (1994–1998); Newcastle Jets FC (A-League Men) (2000–present)

Website
- hunterstadium.com.au

Newcastle International Sports Centre (known under naming rights as McDonald Jones Stadium) is a stadium located in the Newcastle suburb of New Lambton. It is primarily used for rugby league and soccer as the home ground of the Newcastle Knights in the National Rugby League (NRL), and Newcastle Jets FC in the A-League Men.

The stadium opened in 1970, along with the ISC Complex surrounding it. Since then the stadium has received a number of renovations with it now hosting a capacity of 33,000 spectators, 23,000 of which are seated. Newcastle based home design and construction company McDonald Jones Homes owns naming rights to the stadium.

The stadium has hosted games in the 2008 Rugby League World Cup, the 2015 AFC Asian Cup (including the 3rd place playoff) and two semi-finals of the 2026 Rugby League World Cup. It is also set to host games in the 2027 Rugby World Cup. The stadium also hosted the 2018 A-League Grand Final.

== History ==
Work began on the stadium on 1 December 1967, and was officially opened by Queen Elizabeth II on 10 April 1970. It was originally known as the International Sports Centre, and is still part of the ISC complex to this day. The playing surface back then was originally oval shaped to allow both codes of rugby, soccer and cricket to be able to make use of it.

The Newcastle Knights secured a lease on the stadium in 1986, and converted it from an oval to a rectangle layout. During the 1988 Great Britain Lions tour, the Newcastle Knights, in their first season, hosted a match at the ground. On that occasion the Lions, captained by Ellery Hanley, defeated the Knights 28–12.

In 1992, local tyre outlet Marathon Tyres became the naming rights sponsor for the stadium, and it was renamed Marathon Stadium. That year the Knights played Great Britain for a second time as part of the Lions Tour of Australasia. The Ellery Hanley captained Lions took the Knights apart winning 22–0. Later in the 1992 NSWRL season, the Knights qualified for their first ever Finals series.

Towards the end of 2001, energy supplier EnergyAustralia took over naming rights, and thus the stadium became EnergyAustralia Stadium. In February 2011 it was announced that the stadium would be renamed Ausgrid Stadium after EnergyAustralia was renamed Ausgrid.

Before redevelopment, the stadium had a capacity of 28,000, including 5,000 in the main grandstand. The ground attendance record for a sporting event at the venue prior to the redevelopments is 32,642, which was set when the Knights took on the Manly-Warringah Sea Eagles in July 1995.

Following the retirement of former Knights captain Andrew Johns, the new eastern grandstand was renamed The Andrew Johns Stand in honour of Johns in front of a packed crowd before the Knights vs Brisbane Broncos NRL match on 22 April 2007.

The name (Newcastle International Sports Centre) is used primarily by those who wish to mention stadiums by original names, such as non-commercial organisations like the Australian Broadcasting Corporation, and those with other corporate interests such as FIFA or the Asian Football Confederation.

On 16 October 2011, the venue's all-time record sporting attendance was set with 32,890 attending the Australia vs New Zealand Rugby League test match.

In October 2016, McDonald Jones Homes, a local Newcastle company, was named as the new naming rights sponsor of the stadium. This new deal left behind a five year gap between naming rights sponsors at the ground.

=== Redevelopments ===
==== 2003–05 ====
The stadium underwent redevelopment during the years 2003–05, funded mostly by local and state government grants.

Factors that brought on the redevelopment included:

- non-compliance of National Rugby League (NRL) stadium criteria, especially the dressing rooms;
- failure to attract major sporting events to the area, specifically the 2003 Rugby World Cup;
- inadequate and ageing spectator and corporate facilities;
- covered seating capacity well below best practice and NRL standards;
- minimal areas within the grandstand to increase members' patronage both during a sporting event and on non-match-days;
- poor facilities for media officials;
- unsatisfactory temporary spectator facilities to the north and south of the western stand;
- the perceived need for the incumbent State Labor government to contribute to the public infrastructure in a region of safe seats.

The first stage of the redevelopment was completed in early 2004. This consisted of;

- The construction of the lower level of the Eastern Stand (brought into operation for the 2004 NRL season and Anzac Test between Australia and New Zealand). This level holds 7,700 people.
- The relocation of corporate boxes and seating to the North and South stands.

The second stage of construction began in 2004 and was completed in 2005. This consisted of:

- The construction of the Eastern Stand's second level of seating and corporate boxes;
- a new video screen; and
- remedial work for the Western Grandstand, including updating the media facilities.

==== 2008–11 ====
During the 2007 NSW Election campaign, the Premier Morris Iemma promised $30 million towards an upgrade of the stadium, conditional on the Federal Government matching the funds.

On 1 April 2008 the federal government confirmed $10m towards the development of the Western Grandstand. This was in addition to the $30m commitment from the state government. This was a critical step for the stadium's development for the upgrade to be in by 2011. The A$40 million contributed to an expansion of the stadium's capacity to eventually hold over 40,000 as well as general improvements in the stadiums facilities.

From 2008 to 2010 the stadium was upgraded again to around 33 000 seats, with a hope for the stadium to be involved in the 2015 Asian Cup and 2018 World Cup were Australia be the host of those tournaments (Australia did host the Asian Cup, but not the World Cup). As part of the announcement, Morris Iemma stated that the capacity of 33,000 could be increased to the 40,000 necessary for World Cup Hosting, through temporary seating. The total cost of the upgrade was estimated as $60 million, with $50 million from the state government and $10 million from the Federal Government. Although construction was slated to take place during both the Newcastle Knights and Newcastle Jets seasons, developers stated that there would be minimal effect on attendances due to the staged approach.

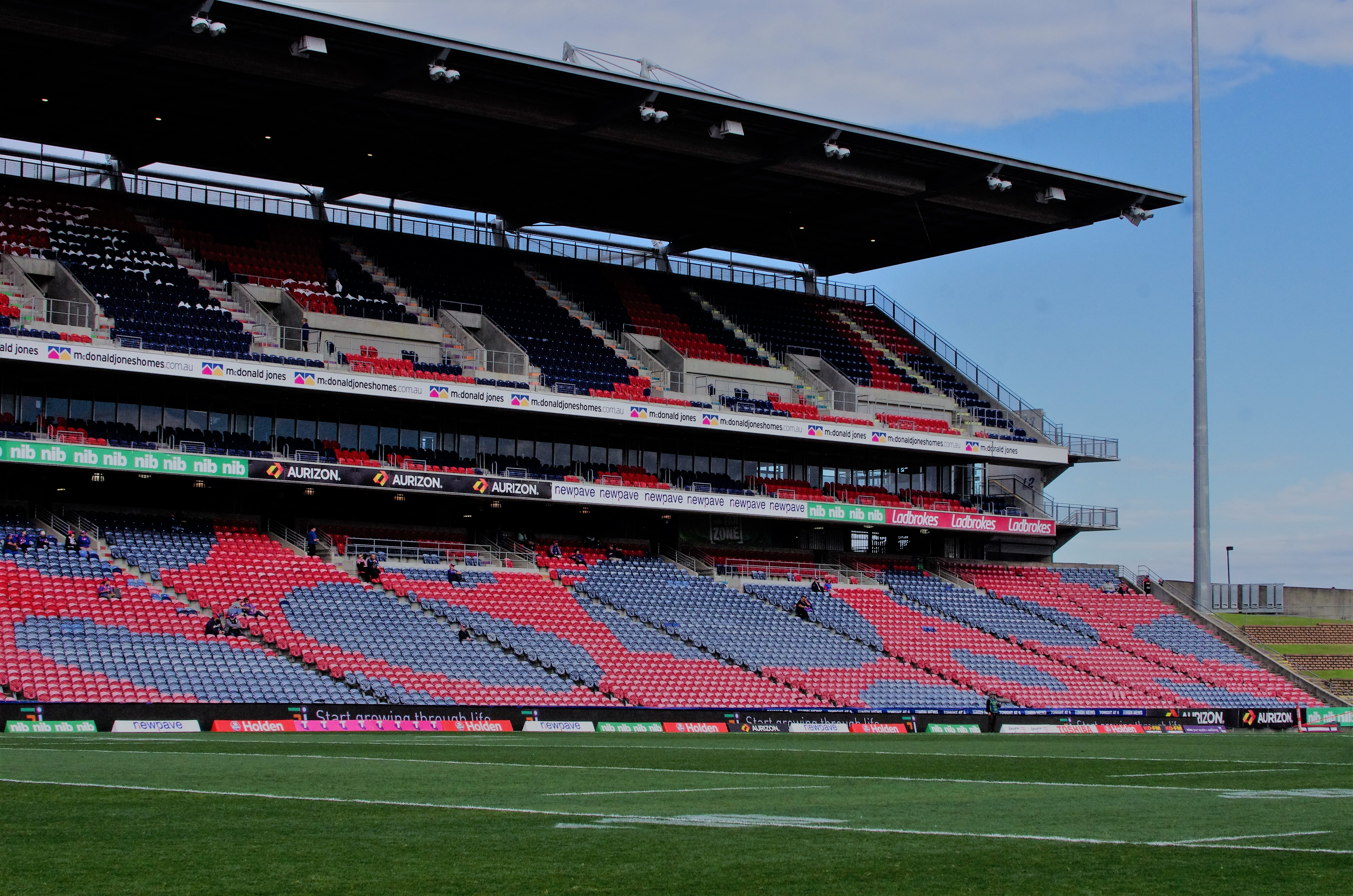
McDonald Jones Stadium Grandstand

The stadium development was planned to be carried out over four stages.

- Stage 1 (now completed) included dressing, warm up and medical rooms, with showers, toilets, ice baths and 855-seats of the spectator concourse in the stadium's south-west.
- Stage 2 (now completed) replicates Stage 1 on the northern side of the Western Grandstand and also included the main western stand's lower concourse.
- Stage 3 (now completed) demolished the old western Grandstand and is replacing it with one similar to the eastern stand.
- Stage 4 (undertaking preparation) will involve building the northern and southern ends of the ground, replacing the grass hills with seated areas.

==== Newcastle Knights Centre of Excellence ====
In June 2018, plans were announced for a Centre of Excellence for the Newcastle Knights located at the southern end of the ground at a cost of $20 million with $10 million provided by the NSW government with the other $10 million funded by the Knights' owners The Wests Group.

==== 2024 upgrades ====
Prior to the start of the 2024 NRL season, the two video screens at the ground were replaced with two 160sqm screens along with a series of minor upgrades to spectator facilities.

== Transport ==
The nearest railway station is Broadmeadow. Newcastle Transport operate a shuttle service from Queens Wharf on match days.

== Uses ==
=== Rugby league ===
The Newcastle Knights of the National Rugby League team have been tenants of the ground since their formation in 1988.

In October 2011 the ground hosted a rugby league one-off test match between Australia and New Zealand. This event set a new ground attendance record for a sporting event of 32,890.

=== Soccer ===
During the National Soccer League competition, three clubs have played their home ground games at this stadium. They are Newcastle KB United (1978–84); Newcastle Rosebud United (1984–86) and Newcastle United (2000–04). The NSL competition folded in 2004.

In 2005, the newly formed national competition (A-League) began to operate. Newcastle United Jets was part of the newly formed competition, and have played at this ground ever since.

The stadium also hosted two 2015 AFC Asian Cup group stage matches, and also a semi final between Australia and the United Arab Emirates and a third place playoff between United Arab Emirates and Iraq.

In February 2017 it was announced that the National Premier Leagues Northern NSW Grand Final would be taking place at the ground in September that year. In the Grand Final between the Edgeworth Eagles and Lambton Jaffas a crowd of 4174 was on hand to see the Jaffas clinch the title beating the Eagles 2–0 deep into Extra Time.

The 2018 A-League Grand Final was held at the venue, contested by the Newcastle Jets and Melbourne Victory, on 5 May 2018.

=== Baseball ===
The Hunter Eagles were formed for the 1994–95 Australian Baseball League season after purchasing the Sydney Wave's licence. The Eagles played in the Australian Baseball League until the end of the 1997–98 season.

=== Rugby union ===
In 2012, it was used for the first match of the 2012 Scotland rugby union tour of Oceania. Scotland won the match, beating Australia 9–6. A tour match was also played at the venue during the 2013 British & Irish Lions tour to Australia, seeing the touring side face a Combined Country outfit in front of 20,071 fans.

International rugby union matches have become increasingly popular in Newcastle, the stadium hosting multiple fixtures of the COVID-19 pandemic-enforced iteration of the 2020 Tri-Nations series. The Wallabies returned to the city in 2025 for the inaugural Vuvale Bowl clash against Fiji. The home side won the match 21-18 in front of a record crowd of 28,122, marking the first time Australia had ever won at the venue, and in Newcastle.

The Australian women's national rugby union team, the Wallaroos have also played at the venue, playing their inaugural match in the 2025 Pacific Four Series, going down 38-12 to New Zealand in front of 4,529 fans.

The stadium is set to host four pool matches of the 2027 Men's Rugby World Cup, and hosted its second neutral Test match in 2026 between Ireland and Japan, as part of the inaugural season of the Nations Championship.

The New South Wales Waratahs played a home fixture of their Super Rugby season from 2019 in Newcastle whilst the Sydney Football Stadium was rebuilt.

=== Concerts ===
List of all concerts held at Newcastle International Sports Centre
Date	Performer(s)	Attendance	Event	Ref.
8 & 10 January 2023	Elton John	47,230	Farewell Yellow Brick Road	
24 October 2023	Paul McCartney	25,631	Got Back	
13 February 2024	P!NK	33,000	Summer Carnival	
12 November 2026	Foo Fighters		Take Cover Tour	
17 November 2026	Robbie Williams		Britpop Tour	
8 December 2026	Guns N' Roses		World Tour 2026	

== Notable games ==
=== Rugby league test matches ===
The venue has hosted three Australia internationals and three Rugby League World Cup games. The results were as follows; Hunter Stadium was also chosen as the host venue for the 2016 Anzac Test between Australia and New Zealand on 6 May.

Date	Opponents	Result	Attendance	Part of
June 1996	Fiji (NRL)	84–14	19,234	
23 April 2004	New Zealand	37–10	21,537	2004 Anzac Test
16 October 2011	New Zealand	42–6	32,890	
6 May 2016	New Zealand	16–0	27,724	2016 Anzac Test

=== Rugby League World Cup ===
Game No.	Date	Result	Attendance	Part of
1	6 November 2008	New Zealand def. England 36–24	15,145	2008 World Cup
2	18 October 2026	Fiji def. Cook Islands 40–12	10,604	2026 World Cup
3	7 November 2026	New Zealand def. Tonga	29,712	2026 World Cup

=== Rugby league tour matches ===
The Newcastle Knights twice hosted the Great Britain Lions at the stadium.

Game No.	Date	Result	Attendance	Notes
1	31 May 1988	Great Britain def. Newcastle Knights 28–12	8,970	1988 Great Britain Lions tour
2	23 June 1992	Great Britain def. Newcastle Knights 22–0	9,758	1992 Great Britain Lions tour

=== 2015 AFC Asian Cup matches ===
Game No.	Date	Stage	"Home" team	Score	"Away" team	Attendance
1	12 January 2015	Group	Japan	4–0	Palestine	17,147
2	17 January 2015	Group	Oman	1–0	Kuwait	7,499
3	27 January 2015	Semi-final	Australia	2–0	United Arab Emirates	21,079
4	30 January 2015	3rd place	United Arab Emirates	3–2	Iraq	12,829

=== Rugby union test matches ===
Date	Team #1	Result	Team #2	Notes	Attendance
5 June 2012	Australia	6–9	Scotland	2012 Scotland rugby union tour of Australia, Fiji and Samoa	20,088
21 November 2020	Australia	15–15	Argentina	2020 Tri-Nations Series	11,749
28 November 2020	Argentina	0–38	New Zealand	2020 Tri-Nations Series	10,104
6 July 2025	Australia	21–18	Fiji	2025 mid-year rugby union tests	28,122
11 July 2026	Japan	20–36	Ireland	2026 Nations Championship	11,021

=== Rugby union tour matches ===
Date	Team #1	Result	Team #2	Notes	Attendance
11 June 2013	NSW/QLD Combined Country	0–64	British & Irish Lions	2013 British & Irish Lions tour to Australia	20,071

=== 2027 Men's Rugby World Cup matches ===
Date	Team #1	Result	Team #2	Round	Attendance
3 October 2027	Japan		Samoa	Pool E	
4 October 2027	Fiji		Spain	Pool C	
11 October 2027	Uruguay		Portugal	Pool D	
17 October 2027	Italy		Georgia	Pool B	
