= 2027 Rugby World Cup =

Eleventh edition of the Rugby World Cup

- Go All Out!

Tournament details
- Host nation: Australia
- Venue: 8 (in 7 host cities)
- Dates: 1 October – 13 November 2027
- No. of nations: 24 (44 qualifying)

The 2027 Men's Rugby World Cup is scheduled to be the 11th edition of the Rugby World Cup, the quadrennial world championship for men's rugby union teams. It is due to take place in Australia from 1 October to 13 November 2027. It will be the first tournament to be branded as the Men's Rugby World Cup, a change that was announced in October 2023 to promote gender parity. It will also be the first to host 24 teams.

South Africa are the two-time defending champions, after beating New Zealand in the 2023 final.

Hong Kong will make their Rugby World Cup debut.

== Host selection and bidding ==
World Rugby was hoping to award the bids for both the 2027 and 2031 Men's World Cups (along with the bids for the 2025 and 2029 Women's World Cups) by May 2022. The process of talking to prospective nations began in February 2021 with the formal candidate process commencing three months later. Finalists were evaluated in February 2022.

By June 2019, Argentina, Australia and Russia had declared their interest in hosting the 2027 Rugby World Cup, but Argentina withdrew their bid in April 2020, leaving two bidders. There was speculation that the United States and South Africa would be interested in hosting the event, but the South African Rugby Union has stated that it would not be bidding for the 2027 World Cup.

World Rugby chairman Bill Beaumont suggested in late 2018 that the host of the Rugby World Cup following the 2023 event in France could be an emerging nation. World Rugby CEO Brett Gosper also suggested in 2019 that World Rugby may bid the 2027 and 2031 World Cups together (as they did with England 2015 and Japan 2019), so that they could make "a bolder decision and a traditional decision." The hosts for the 2027 and 2031 tournaments were to be revealed in May 2022.

The fact that three consecutive World Cups (England 2015, Japan 2019, and France 2023) occurred in the Northern Hemisphere made the Southern Hemisphere countries considered the favourites.

On 12 May 2022, it was announced that Australia would host the 2027 Rugby World Cup.

=== Announced bidders ===
==== Australia ====
Rugby Australia announced on 13 December 2017 that Australia would bid for the 2027 Rugby World Cup. Australia has previously hosted the inaugural 1987 Rugby World Cup together with New Zealand, as well as the 2003 Rugby World Cup on its own.

=== Withdrawn bids ===
==== Argentina ====
Argentina had announced on 5 October 2016 that it would bid for the 2027 Rugby World Cup, but withdrew its bid in April 2020. Argentina has never hosted the tournament before, and World Rugby chairman Bill Beaumont had pledged that he would back the right of countries such as Argentina to bid for the event. Argentina is the only country to reach the World Cup semi-finals that has not hosted any World Cup matches. In April 2020, Argentina withdrew its bid to strengthen the Australian bid, making Australia favourites for the 2027 Rugby World Cup host.

==== Russia ====
Stanislav Druzhinin of the Russian Rugby Union said at a meeting on 31 May 2019 that Russia would apply to host the 2027 Rugby World Cup. Russia would use the 2018 FIFA World Cup stadiums and legacy for the 2027 Rugby World Cup. President Vladimir Putin backed Russia's bid to host the 2027 Rugby World Cup. Rugby Union of Russia could not proceed with its bid to host after Court of Arbitration for Sport (CAS) imposed a two-year ban on 17 December 2020 on Russia hosting any major sports tournament.

== Expansion ==
Talks of expanding the tournament to 24 teams intensified after the performances of emerging nations like Chile and Portugal at the 2023 Rugby World Cup, and on 4 October 2023, it was reported that World Rugby had decided to expand the World Cup to 24 teams in order to help grow the sport. A "Swiss model" pool stage similar to those adopted by the European Rugby Champions Cup and football's UEFA Champions League, or six pools of four with an additional round of 16 were under consideration.

The expansion to 24 teams was confirmed on 24 October 2023, with the format later confirmed in October 2025.

To accommodate the expansion from a 20-team finals tournament to 24 teams, the format was changed from the one used since the 2003 Rugby World Cup. Instead of the historical four pools of five teams, there will now be six pools with four teams in each. The top two teams from each pool, along with the four best third-place teams, will progress to the knockout stage, commencing with a newly included Round of 16 round. At the conclusion of the tournament, 52 matches will have taken place, an increase on the 48 matches taken place since 2003.

== Venues ==
=== Stadia ===
Eight venues in seven cities have been chosen for the tournament. The opening match, as well as the opening ceremony, will be at Perth Stadium, while the final (as well as both semi-finals and the bronze final) will be played at Stadium Australia in Sydney.

In early January 2025, it was reported that no matches would take place in the state of Victoria after the Victoria State Government pulled its bid in protest of Rugby Australia's (RA) revocation of Melbourne Rebels' participation in Super Rugby Pacific. The full list of host cities was revealed later in the month and confirmed that the state of Victoria would host games in Melbourne, with the venue yet to be decided. In January 2026, Docklands Stadium was confirmed to be the Melbourne venue. World Rugby reportedly struck a deal to host the tournament matches at the venue instead of the Melbourne Cricket Ground (MCG) after the latter's availability could not be guaranteed in October 2027 due to an exclusive clause in a deal between the Victorian government and the National Football League (NFL).

Sydney		Perth	Adelaide
Stadium Australia (Note: Stadium/site used in the 2003 Rugby World Cup.)	Sydney Football Stadium (Note: Stadium built on the land of the old Sydney Football Stadium, which was used in the 2003 Rugby World Cup.)	Perth Stadium	Adelaide Oval
Capacity: 82,000	Capacity: 42,500	Capacity: 60,000 (rectangular mode)	Capacity: 53,500
Melbourne			Brisbane
Docklands Stadium			Lang Park
Capacity: 53,000			Capacity: 52,500
Newcastle			Townsville
Newcastle Stadium			North Queensland Stadium
Capacity: 30,000			Capacity: 25,000

These host cities will host the following matches:

- Adelaide, South Australia
  - Six pool matches
- Brisbane, Queensland
  - Six pool, two round-of-16 matches, and two quarter-finals
- Melbourne, Victoria
  - Six pool and, two round-of-16 matches
- Newcastle, New South Wales
  - Four pool matches
- Perth, Western Australia
  - Opening ceremony, five pool, and two round-of-16 matches
- Sydney, Stadium Australia, New South Wales
  - Two pool, two quarter-finals, two semi-finals, Bronze Final, and Final
- Sydney, Sydney Football Stadium, New South Wales
  - Three pool and two round-of-16 matches
- Townsville, Queensland
  - Four pool matches

=== Training Venues ===
On 25 September 2026, 29 outdoor training venues were announced, providing all 24 participating teams with access to state-of-the-art facilities as they prepare for their respective games.

City	Training Venue
Adelaide	St Peter's College; Adelaide University West Beach; Norwood Oval; Unley Oval
Brisbane	National Rugby Training Centre Ballymore; St Joseph's College; Sunnybank Rugby Union Club; Brisbane Grammar School; Easts Rugby Union Club; Padua College
Melbourne	La Trobe University; Xavier College; Bridges Recreation Reserve
Newcastle	Southern Beaches Rugby Club; Newcastle Number 2 Sports Ground; University of Newcastle
Perth	UWA Sports Park; Kingsway Regional Sporting Complex; Waterbank Training Facility; Perth Rectangular Stadium
Sydney	NSW Rugby Centre of Excellence; Jubilee Stadium; NSWRL Centre of Excellence; Shore School; Eric Tweedale Stadium; Manly Warringah Sea Eagles Centre of Excellence
Townsville	Townsville Sports Precinct; Riverway Stadium; Cowboys Centre of Excellence

== Teams ==
=== Qualification ===
A total of 12 teams gained automatic qualification for the tournament as hosts and by finishing in the top three of the pools at the 2023 Rugby World Cup. The qualification process for the remaining slots was confirmed by World Rugby on 13 August 2024. Through regional competitions, four teams qualified from Europe, three from the Pacific and one each from Africa, Asia and South America. One team then qualified from a South America/Pacific play-off. The final team was decided in a four-team repechage tournament consisting of Belgium, winners of their continental ranking finals, Namibia as runners-up in their continental tournament, Samoa, the loser of the South America/Pacific play off, and Brazil, who replaced Paraguay after the latter had fielded an ineligible player in their third-place playoff in the South American qualifier.

Qualified teams
Region	Team	Qualification method	Previous apps	Previous best result	World Rugby Ranking (Note: As of 1 December 2025, the rankings used for the draw following the end-of-year internationals.)
Africa	South Africa	2023 Rugby World Cup pool stage	8	Champions (1995, 2007, 2019, 2023)	1
Africa	Zimbabwe	2025 Rugby Africa Cup winners (Africa 1)	2	Pool stage (1987, 1991)	24
Asia	Hong Kong	2025 Asia Rugby Championship winners (Asia 1)	—N/a	Debut	23
Europe	England	2023 Rugby World Cup pool stage	10	Champions (2003)	3
Europe	France	2023 Rugby World Cup pool stage	10	Runners-up (1987, 1999, 2011)	5
Europe	Ireland	2023 Rugby World Cup pool stage	10	Quarter-finals (eight times)	4
Europe	Italy	2023 Rugby World Cup pool stage	10	Pool stage (ten times)	10
Europe	Scotland	2023 Rugby World Cup pool stage	10	Fourth place (1991)	9
Europe	Wales	2023 Rugby World Cup pool stage	10	Third place (1987)	11
Europe	Georgia	2025 Rugby Europe Championship winners (Europe 1)	6	Pool stage (six times)	13
Europe	Spain	2025 Rugby Europe Championship runners-up (Europe 2)	1	Pool stage (1999)	15
Europe	Romania	2025 Rugby Europe Championship third place (Europe 3)	9	Pool stage (nine times)	22
Europe	Portugal	2025 Rugby Europe Championship fourth place (Europe 4)	2	Pool stage (2007, 2023)	20
Pacific	Australia	Hosts	10	Champions (1991, 1999)	7
Pacific	Fiji	2023 Rugby World Cup pool stage	9	Quarter-finals (1987, 2007, 2023)	8
Pacific	Japan	2023 Rugby World Cup pool stage	10	Quarter-finals (2019)	12
Pacific	New Zealand	2023 Rugby World Cup pool stage	10	Champions (1987, 2011, 2015)	2
Pacific	Tonga	2025 World Rugby Pacific Nations Cup third place (Pacific 1) (Note: The top two teams of the 2025 World Rugby Pacific Nations Cup, Fiji and Japan, respectively, already qualified based on their performance in the 2023 Rugby World Cup. The next best placed teams would fill the Pacific 1 and 2 berths.)	9	Pool stage (nine times)	18
Pacific	Samoa	Final qualifier	9	Quarter-finals (1991, 1995)	19
Pacific	Canada	2025 World Rugby Pacific Nations Cup fourth place (Pacific 2)	9	Quarter-finals (1991)	25
Pacific	United States	2025 World Rugby Pacific Nations Cup fifth place (Pacific 3)	8	Pool stage (eight times)	16
South America	Argentina	2023 Rugby World Cup pool stage	10	Third place (2007)	6
South America	Uruguay	2025 Sudamérica Rugby Championship winners (Sudamérica 1)	5	Pool stage (five times)	14
South America	Chile	Pacific/Sudamérica qualifying play-off winner	1	Pool stage (2023)	17

=== Draw ===
In May 2025, World Rugby confirmed that the draw would take place on 3 December 2025, and the format for the draw was later confirmed in September 2025. For the first time, the draw took place after all teams had qualified. All of the 24 qualified teams were ranked within the top 25 of the world rankings. The only top 25 team to miss out on qualifying was 21st-ranked Belgium. Belgium drew to Samoa on the final matchday of the Final Qualification Tournament, which meant they finished behind Samoa by 1 point in the table.

The 24 teams were divided into six pools, with four teams in each. In the draw, one team from each band (described below) was randomly allocated to each pool. As hosts, Australia was automatically allocated to Pool A.

The method for determining the pools was that the 24 qualified teams were divided into four bands, using the World Rugby Rankings at the end of the 2025 November international window to determine how the teams will be divided into the bands.

- Band 1: Seeds 1 to 6
- Band 2: Seeds 7 to 12
- Band 3: Seeds 13 to 18
- Band 4: Seeds 19 to 24

This meant the 24 qualified teams were seeded as follows (world ranking as of 1 December 2025, the final rankings before the draw.):

Band 1
- South Africa (1)
- New Zealand (2)
- England (3)
- Ireland (4)
- France (5)
- Argentina (6)
Band 2
- Australia (7)
- Fiji (8)
- Scotland (9)
- Italy (10)
- Wales (11)
- Japan (12)
Band 3
- Georgia (13)
- Uruguay (14)
- Spain (15)
- United States (16)
- Chile (17)
- Tonga (18)
Band 4
- Samoa (19)
- Portugal (20)
- Romania (22)
- Hong Kong (23)
- Zimbabwe (24)
- Canada (25)

== Pool stage ==
Competing countries were divided into six pools of four teams (pools A to F) as described above. Teams in each pool will play one another in a round-robin, with the top two teams advancing to the knockout stage, to be joined by the 4 highest ranked third placed teams.

Pool A	Pool B	Pool C	Pool D	Pool E	Pool F
New Zealand; Australia; Chile; Hong Kong	South Africa; Italy; Georgia; Romania	Argentina; Fiji; Spain; Canada	Ireland; Scotland; Uruguay; Portugal	France; Japan; United States; Samoa	England; Wales; Tonga; Zimbabwe

Points allocation in pool stage

- Four points are awarded for a win.
- Two points are awarded for a draw.
- A try bonus point is awarded to teams that score four or more tries in a match.
- A losing bonus point is awarded to teams that lose a match by fewer than eight points.

Tie-breaking criteria for pool play
1. The winner of the Match in which the two tied Teams have played each other shall be the higher ranked.
2. The Team which has the best difference between points scored for and points scored against in all its pool Matches shall be the higher ranked.
3. The Team which has the best difference between tries scored for and tries scored against in all its pool Matches shall be the higher ranked.
4. The Team which has scored most points in all its pool Matches shall be the higher ranked.
5. The Team which has scored most tries in all its pool Matches shall be the higher ranked.
6. Should the tie be unresolved at the conclusion of steps 1 through 5, the rankings as per the updated Official World Rugby World Rankings on 18 October 2027 will determine the higher ranked Team. See the official World Rugby Rankings.

For clarification, in the case of a tie between three or more Teams at the end of the pool phase, once the highest ranked Team has been determined following the above criteria, to determine the next higher ranked Team the process would repeat, starting at the first criterion.

=== Pool A ===
Pos	Team	Pld	W	D	L	PF	PA	PD	TF	TA	TB	LB	Pts	Qualification
1	New Zealand	0	0	0	0	0	0	0	0	0	0	0	0	Advance to knockout stage
2	Australia (H)	0	0	0	0	0	0	0	0	0	0	0	0	Advance to knockout stage
3	Chile	0	0	0	0	0	0	0	0	0	0	0	0	Possible knockout stage based on ranking
4	Hong Kong	0	0	0	0	0	0	0	0	0	0	0	0	

First match(es) will be played: 1 October 2027. Source: World Rugby
Rules for classification: Pool stage tiebreakers
(H) Host

1 October 2027	Australia	v	Hong Kong	Perth Stadium, Perth
2 October 2027	New Zealand	v	Chile	Perth Stadium, Perth
9 October 2027	New Zealand	v	Australia	Stadium Australia, Sydney
9 October 2027	Chile	v	Hong Kong	North Queensland Stadium, Townsville
15 October 2027	New Zealand	v	Hong Kong	Docklands Stadium, Melbourne
16 October 2027	Australia	v	Chile	Lang Park, Brisbane

=== Pool B ===
Pos	Team	Pld	W	D	L	PF	PA	PD	TF	TA	TB	LB	Pts	Qualification
1	South Africa	0	0	0	0	0	0	0	0	0	0	0	0	Advance to knockout stage
2	Italy	0	0	0	0	0	0	0	0	0	0	0	0	Advance to knockout stage
3	Georgia	0	0	0	0	0	0	0	0	0	0	0	0	Possible knockout stage based on ranking
4	Romania	0	0	0	0	0	0	0	0	0	0	0	0	

First match(es) will be played: 3 October 2027. Source: World Rugby
Rules for classification: Pool stage tiebreakers

3 October 2027	South Africa	v	Italy	Adelaide Oval, Adelaide
3 October 2027	Georgia	v	Romania	North Queensland Stadium, Townsville
10 October 2027	South Africa	v	Georgia	Lang Park, Brisbane
11 October 2027	Italy	v	Romania	Sydney Football Stadium, Sydney
17 October 2027	Italy	v	Georgia	Newcastle Stadium, Newcastle
17 October 2027	South Africa	v	Romania	Perth Stadium, Perth

=== Pool C ===
Pos	Team	Pld	W	D	L	PF	PA	PD	TF	TA	TB	LB	Pts	Qualification
1	Argentina	0	0	0	0	0	0	0	0	0	0	0	0	Advance to knockout stage
2	Fiji	0	0	0	0	0	0	0	0	0	0	0	0	Advance to knockout stage
3	Spain	0	0	0	0	0	0	0	0	0	0	0	0	Possible knockout stage based on ranking
4	Canada	0	0	0	0	0	0	0	0	0	0	0	0	

First match(es) will be played: 4 October 2027. Source: World Rugby
Rules for classification: Pool stage tiebreakers

3 October 2027	Argentina	v	Canada	Lang Park, Brisbane
4 October 2027	Fiji	v	Spain	Newcastle Stadium, Newcastle
10 October 2027	Fiji	v	Canada	Adelaide Oval, Adelaide
10 October 2027	Argentina	v	Spain	Docklands Stadium, Melbourne
16 October 2027	Argentina	v	Fiji	Adelaide Oval, Adelaide
17 October 2027	Spain	v	Canada	North Queensland Stadium, Townsville

=== Pool D ===
Pos	Team	Pld	W	D	L	PF	PA	PD	TF	TA	TB	LB	Pts	Qualification
1	Ireland	0	0	0	0	0	0	0	0	0	0	0	0	Advance to knockout stage
2	Scotland	0	0	0	0	0	0	0	0	0	0	0	0	Advance to knockout stage
3	Uruguay	0	0	0	0	0	0	0	0	0	0	0	0	Possible knockout stage based on ranking
4	Portugal	0	0	0	0	0	0	0	0	0	0	0	0	

First match(es) will be played: 3 October 2027. Source: World Rugby
Rules for classification: Pool stage tiebreakers

3 October 2027	Scotland	v	Uruguay	Docklands Stadium, Melbourne
4 October 2027	Ireland	v	Portugal	Sydney Football Stadium, Sydney
10 October 2027	Ireland	v	Scotland	Perth Stadium, Perth
11 October 2027	Uruguay	v	Portugal	Newcastle Stadium, Newcastle
17 October 2027	Ireland	v	Uruguay	Docklands Stadium, Melbourne
17 October 2027	Scotland	v	Portugal	Lang Park, Brisbane

=== Pool E ===
Pos	Team	Pld	W	D	L	PF	PA	PD	TF	TA	TB	LB	Pts	Qualification
1	France	0	0	0	0	0	0	0	0	0	0	0	0	Advance to knockout stage
2	Japan	0	0	0	0	0	0	0	0	0	0	0	0	Advance to knockout stage
3	United States	0	0	0	0	0	0	0	0	0	0	0	0	Possible knockout stage based on ranking
4	Samoa	0	0	0	0	0	0	0	0	0	0	0	0	

First match(es) will be played: 2 October 2027. Source: World Rugby
Rules for classification: Pool stage tiebreakers

2 October 2027	France	v	United States	Docklands Stadium, Melbourne
3 October 2027	Japan	v	Samoa	Newcastle Stadium, Newcastle
9 October 2027	United States	v	Samoa	Perth Stadium, Perth
9 October 2027	France	v	Japan	Lang Park, Brisbane
15 October 2027	Japan	v	United States	Adelaide Oval, Adelaide
17 October 2027	France	v	Samoa	Sydney Football Stadium, Sydney

=== Pool F ===
Pos	Team	Pld	W	D	L	PF	PA	PD	TF	TA	TB	LB	Pts	Qualification
1	England	0	0	0	0	0	0	0	0	0	0	0	0	Advance to knockout stage
2	Wales	0	0	0	0	0	0	0	0	0	0	0	0	Advance to knockout stage
3	Tonga	0	0	0	0	0	0	0	0	0	0	0	0	Possible knockout stage based on ranking
4	Zimbabwe	0	0	0	0	0	0	0	0	0	0	0	0	

First match(es) will be played: 2 October 2027. Source: World Rugby
Rules for classification: Pool stage tiebreakers

2 October 2027	Wales	v	Zimbabwe	Adelaide Oval, Adelaide
2 October 2027	England	v	Tonga	Lang Park, Brisbane
8 October 2027	Wales	v	Tonga	Docklands Stadium, Melbourne
8 October 2027	England	v	Zimbabwe	Adelaide Oval, Adelaide
15 October 2027	Tonga	v	Zimbabwe	North Queensland Stadium, Townsville
16 October 2027	England	v	Wales	Stadium Australia, Sydney

== Knockout stage ==
The knockout stage will consist of four single-elimination rounds culminating in a final and a third-place playoff. In the case of a tie in regulation time, two 10-minute periods of extra time will be played to determine a winner. If the scores are tied at the end of extra time, an additional 10-minute "sudden death" period will be played, with the first team to score any points being the winner. If the score still remains tied, a kicking competition will ensue.

While the positions of the winner and runner-up in each pool is fixed in the bracket, the four best third placed teams can find themselves in a number of different positions in the knock-out, depending which four pools they emerge from, but although fifteen different combinations of pool teams can emerge, each possible combination of four teams can only be accommodated in one manner. Furthermore, the construction of the draw is such that if the 3rd place team comes from any of pools A, B, C, or D they can only appear in one Round of 16 knockout match; meanwhile if the 3rd place team is from Pools E and/or F they can potentially appear in any of the slots, to ensure that only novel games take place during the first two knockout rounds.

In the event of a tie in pool points for the 3rd placed team they will be separated by points difference, points scored, and tries scored, in that order. In the event teams are still tied after applying those three criteria, the team with the highest World Rugby Men's Ranking, as of 18 October 2027 will progress.

=== Round of 16 third-place permutations ===
Third-placed teams qualify from groups						A1 vs	B1 vs	C1 vs	D1 vs
A	B	C	D			C3	D3	A3	B3
A	B	C		E		C3	E3	A3	B3
A	B	C			F	C3	F3	A3	B3
A	B		D	E		E3	D3	A3	B3
A	B		D		F	F3	D3	A3	B3
A	B			E	F	E3	F3	A3	B3
A		C	D	E		C3	D3	A3	E3
A		C	D		F	C3	D3	A3	F3
A		C		E	F	C3	E3	A3	F3
A			D	E	F	E3	D3	A3	F3
	B	C	D	E		C3	D3	E3	B3
	B	C	D		F	C3	D3	F3	B3
	B	C		E	F	C3	E3	F3	B3
	B		D	E	F	E3	D3	F3	B3
		C	D	E	F	C3	D3	E3	F3

=== Bracket ===
Round of 16
23 October – Brisbane
Winner Pool A
Pool C/E/F 3rd
23 October – Perth
Winner Pool B
Pool D/E/F 3rd
23 October – Sydney (Football)
Runner-up Pool C
Runner-up Pool F
23 October – Melbourne
Winner Pool E
Runner-up Pool D
24 October – Brisbane
Runner-up Pool A
Runner-up Pool E
24 October – Perth
Winner Pool F
Runner-up Pool B
24 October – Sydney (Football)
Winner Pool C
Pool A/E/F 3rd
24 October – Melbourne
Winner Pool D
Pool B/E/F 3rd

Quarter-finals
30 October – Sydney (Australia)
30 October – Brisbane
31 October – Sydney (Australia)
31 October – Brisbane

Semi-finals
5 November – Sydney (Australia)
6 November – Sydney (Australia)

Final
13 November – Sydney (Australia)
Bronze final
12 November – Sydney (Australia)

=== Round of 16 ===
23 October 2027
14:15 AEDT (UTC+11)

2nd Pool C	Rd16 1	2nd Pool F

Sydney Football Stadium, Sydney

23 October 2027
15:45 AEST (UTC+10)

1st Pool A	Rd16 2	3rd Pool C/E/F

Lang Park, Brisbane

23 October 2027
19:15 AEDT (UTC+11)

1st Pool E	Rd16 3	2nd Pool D

Docklands Stadium, Melbourne

23 October 2027
18:45 AWST (UTC+08)

1st Pool B	Rd16 4	3rd Pool D/E/F

Perth Stadium, Perth

24 October 2027
14:15 AEDT (UTC+11)

1st Pool C	Rd16 5	3rd Pool A/E/F

Sydney Football Stadium, Sydney

24 October 2027
16:45 AEDT (UTC+11)

1st Pool D	Rd16 6	3rd Pool B/E/F

Docklands Stadium, Melbourne

24 October 2027
18:15 AEST (UTC+10)

2nd Pool A	Rd16 7	2nd Pool E

Lang Park, Brisbane

24 October 2027
18:45 AWST (UTC+08)

1st Pool F	Rd16 8	2nd Pool B

Perth Stadium, Perth

=== Quarter-finals ===
30 October 2027
16:45 AEDT (UTC+11)

Winner R16 2	QF 1	Winner R16 4

Stadium Australia, Sydney

30 October 2027
18:45 AEST (UTC+10)

Winner R16 1	QF 2	Winner R16 3

Lang Park, Brisbane

31 October 2027
16:00 AEST (UTC+10)

Winner R16 5	QF 3	Winner R16 6

Lang Park, Brisbane

31 October 2027
20:00 AEDT (UTC+11)

Winner R16 7	QF 4	Winner R16 8

Stadium Australia, Sydney

=== Semi-finals ===
5 November 2027
20:00 AEDT (UTC+11)

Winner QF 1	SF 1	Winner QF 2

Stadium Australia, Sydney

6 November 2027
20:00 AEDT (UTC+11)

Winner QF 3	SF 2	Winner QF 4

Stadium Australia, Sydney

=== Bronze final ===
12 November 2027
19:45 AEDT (UTC+11)

RU SF 1	v	RU SF 2

Stadium Australia, Sydney

=== Final ===
13 November 2027
20:00 AEDT (UTC+11)

Winner SF 1	v	Winner SF 2

Stadium Australia, Sydney

== Broadcasting rights ==
Rights are agreed by World Rugby for each region and territory.

Territory	Rights holder	Ref.
Australia	Stan Sport	
Australia	Nine Network	
Austria, Germany, and Switzerland	ProSieben	
Canada	TSN	
Cook Islands	CITV and Vaka TV	
Czechia and Slovakia	Nova Sport	
Fiji	Fiji TV	
France	TF1	
Georgia	1TV	
India and South Asia	Sony	
Ireland	RTE	
Israel	Sport 1	
Kiribati	Kiri One	
Latín America (Central and South America)	ESPN	
Middle East and North Africa	StarzPlay	
Nauru	NTV	
Netherlands	Ziggo	
Niue	BCN	
New Zealand	Sky Sport	
New Zealand	Sky Open	
Papua New Guinea	EM TV	
Portugal	Sport TV	
Romania	Pro TV	
Samoa	EFKS TV	
Solomon Islands	TTV	
South Africa and Sub-Saharan Africa	SuperSport (Note: The Canal+ Group confirmed an agreement with World Rugby for the rights to broadcast 2027 Men's Rugby World Cup and 2029 Women's Rugby World Cup live on SuperSport, on DStv, across Sub-Saharan Africa.)	
South East Asia	beIN Sports	
Spain and Andorra	Movistar	
Taiwan	ELTA TV and 愛爾達電視	
Tonga	TBC	
Tuvalu	TVBC	
United Kingdom	ITV	
United States	Paramount+	
Vanuatu	VBTC	
Inflight & Ships	Sport 24	

== Marketing ==
The tournament will be the first branded as the Men's Rugby World Cup, a change that was announced in October 2023. All previous editions were branded as simply the Rugby World Cup, with the Women's tournament branded as the Women's Rugby World Cup between 1991 and 2017 and without a gender designation in the 2021 tournament.

=== Sponsorship ===
Principal partners	Official partners	Official suppliers & supporters
Asahi Breweries; Emirates; Visa	Coca-Cola; IHG Hotels & Resorts; Isuzu; Liqui Moly	ChildFund Rugby; Dove Men+Care; Fanatics; Gilbert; Lipovitan D; Macron; Meiji; Mitsubishi Estate; Ticketmaster; Woolworths

== See also ==
- 2029 Women's Rugby World Cup
