= History of rugby union matches between Georgia and Romania =

Georgia and Romania have played each other on 29 occasions. Georgia have won 19 times, Romania 9 times and 1 match has been drawn. They regularly play each other in the Rugby Europe Championship (previously named European Nations Cup).

The first match was played on 18 November 1998 at Lansdowne Road and was won by Romania 27–23.

The two sides have played each other once in a Rugby World Cup game in the 2011 Rugby World Cup in New Zealand. Georgia won the match 25–9.

== Antim Cup ==
Since 2002, the winner of Georgia – Romania matches have been awarded the Antim Cup. It is named after the Romanian Orthodox Metropolitan Anthim the Iberian, who came from Georgia. The Antim Cup is contested each time Georgia and Romania meet in a senior international match other than World Cup matches or qualifiers. The holder retains the cup unless the challenger wins the match in normal time. It is challenge cup along the lines of the Calcutta Cup and Bledisloe Cups to be annually played for between the Georgians and the Romanians.

== Summary ==
=== Overall ===
Georgia and Romania have played each other on Rugby World Cup, Rugby World Cup qualification and in annual tournament - Rugby Europe Championship

Details	Played	Won by Georgia	Won by Romania	Drawn	Georgia points	Romania points
In Georgia	17	14	3	0	517	244
In Romania	12	6	5	1	191	207
Neutral venue	2	1	1	0	48	36
Overall	31	21	9	1	756	487

=== Records ===
Note: Date shown in brackets indicates when the record was or last set.

Record	Georgia	Romania
Longest winning streak	8 (18 March 2018 – present)	3 (6 Apr 2002 – 12 Mar 2005)
Largest points for
Home	56 (12 August 2023)	35 (25 February 2006)
Away	31 (7 April 2001)	31 (6 April 2002)
Largest winning margin
Home	50 (12 August 2023)	25 (25 February 2006)
Away	16 (28 September 2011)	13 (30 March 2003)

== Results ==
No.	Date	Venue	Score	Winner	Competition
1	18 November 1998	Lansdowne Road, Dublin (Ireland)	23–27	Romania	1999 Rugby World Cup Qualifying
2	2 April 2000	Dinamo Arena, Tbilisi	20–23	Romania	2000 European Nations Cup
3	7 April 2001	Stadionul Dinamo, Bucharest	20–31	Georgia	2000–01 European Nations Cup
4	6 April 2002	Dinamo Arena, Tbilisi	23–31	Romania	2001–02 European Nations Cup
5	30 March 2003	Dinamo Arena, Tbilisi	6–19	Romania	2003–04 European Nations Cup
6	27 March 2004	Agronomia Stadium, Iași	25–18	Romania	2003–04 European Nations Cup
7	12 March 2005	Dinamo Arena, Tbilisi	20–13	Georgia	2004–06 European Nations Cup
8	25 February 2006	Stadionul Ghencea II, Bucharest	35–10	Romania	2004–06 European Nations Cup
9	7 October 2006	Stadionul Dinamo, Bucharest	20–8	Romania	2007 Rugby World Cup Qualifying
10	3 February 2007	Stadionul Dinamo II, Bucharest	17–20	Georgia	2006–08 European Nations Cup
11	9 February 2008	Mikheil Meskhi Stadium, Tbilisi	22–7	Georgia	2006–08 European Nations Cup
12	14 March 2009	Dinamo Arena, Tbilisi	28–23	Georgia	2008–10 European Nations Cup
13	13 March 2010	Stadionul Arcul de Triumf, Bucharest	22–10	Romania	2008–10 European Nations Cup
14	12 March 2011	Mikheil Meskhi Stadium, Tbilisi	18–11	Georgia	2010–12 European Nations Cup
15	28 September 2011	Arena Manawatu, Palmerston North (New Zealand)	25–9	Georgia	2011 Rugby World Cup Pool match
16	10 March 2012	Stadionul Arcul de Triumf, Bucharest	13–19	Georgia	2010–12 European Nations Cup
17	16 March 2013	Stadionul Arcul de Triumf, Bucharest	9–9	draw	2012–14 European Nations Cup (Note: The 2012–14 European Nations Cup was also a Rugby World Cup qualification tournament for the 2015 Rugby World Cup.)
18	15 March 2014	Mikheil Meskhi Stadium, Tbilisi	22–9	Georgia	2012–14 European Nations Cup
19	21 March 2015	Stadionul Arcul de Triumf, Bucharest	6–15	Georgia	2014–16 European Nations Cup
20	19 March 2016	Dinamo Arena, Tbilisi	38–9	Georgia	2014–16 European Nations Cup
21	19 March 2017	Stadionul Arcul de Triumf, Bucharest	8–7	Romania	2017 Rugby Europe Championship
22	18 March 2018	Dinamo Arena, Tbilisi	25–16	Georgia	2018 Rugby Europe Championship
23	9 February 2019	Cluj Arena, Cluj-Napoca	9–18	Georgia	2019 Rugby Europe Championship
24	1 February 2020	Dinamo Arena, Tbilisi	41–13	Georgia	2020 Rugby Europe Championship
25	28 March 2021	Mikheil Meskhi Stadium, Tbilisi	28–17	Georgia	2021 Rugby Europe Championship (Note: Both the 2021 and 2022 Rugby Europe Championship tournaments doubled as Rugby World Cup Qualifying for 2023.)
26	12 March 2022	Stadionul Arcul de Triumf, Bucharest	23–26	Georgia	2022 Rugby Europe Championship
27	5 March 2023	Achvala Stadium, Tbilisi	31–7	Georgia	2023 Rugby Europe Championship
28	12 August 2023	Mikheil Meskhi Stadium, Tbilisi	56–6	Georgia	2023 Rugby World Cup warm-up matches
29	2 March 2024	Mikheil Meskhi Stadium, Tbilisi	43–5	Georgia	2024 Rugby Europe Championship
30	1 March 2025	Achvala Stadium, Tbilisi	43–5	Georgia	2025 Rugby Europe Championship

== See also ==
- History of rugby union matches between Georgia and Russia
