= 2027 Men's Rugby World Cup qualifying =

Rugby World Cup qualification process

Tournament details
- Dates: 30 April 2024 – November 2025
- No. of nations: 44

The qualification process for the 2027 Men's Rugby World Cup in Australia began during the pool stages of the 2023 tournament in France, where the top three teams from each of the four pools qualified automatically for the 2027 event.

With an expansion to twenty-four teams from 2027, a further twelve teams qualified through regional, cross-regional play-offs and the Final Qualification Tournament.

Unlike previous years, the qualification process took place over two years (previously three), so that the qualified teams had a longer preparation time in the run-in to the World Cup in October 2027.

In total 44 teams took place in 95 games to decide the 12 places available to qualifiers.

== Qualified teams ==
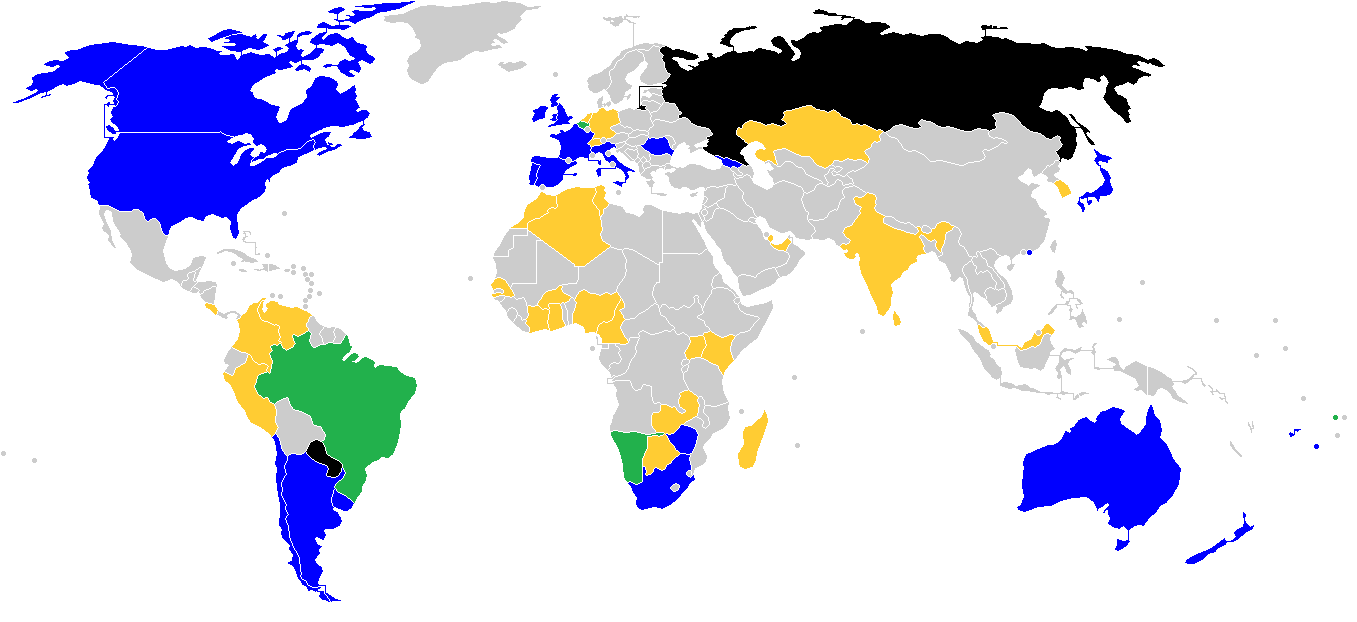
Qualification status: Qualified for the 2027 Rugby World Cup. Failed to qualify. May still qualify Withdrew or suspended.

Region	Automatic qualifiers	Continental qualifiers	Play-off / FQT qualifiers	Total teams
Africa	South Africa (holders)	Zimbabwe (Africa 1)	—	2
Asia	—	Hong Kong (Asia 1)	—	1
Europe	England; France; Ireland; Italy; Scotland; Wales	Georgia (Europe 1); Spain (Europe 2); Romania (Europe 3); Portugal (Europe 4)	—	10
Pacific	Australia (host); Fiji; Japan; New Zealand	Tonga (Pacific 1); Canada (Pacific 2); United States (Pacific 3)	Samoa (Final Qualifier)	8
South America	Argentina	Uruguay (Sudamérica 1)	Chile (Pacific / Sudamérica play-off)	3
Totals	12	10	2	24

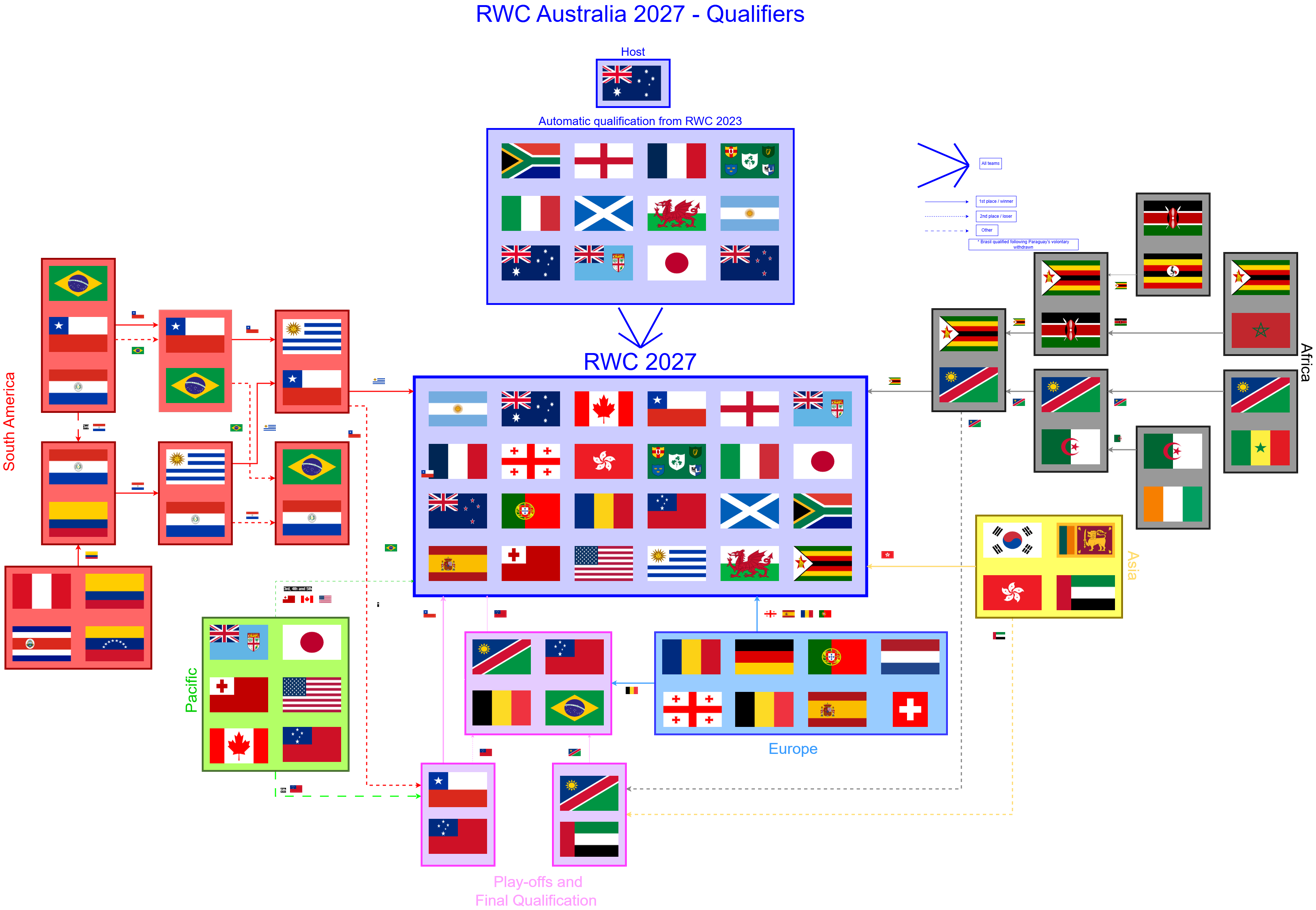

== Regional qualification process ==
Following confirmation of the twelve automatically qualified teams from the 2023 Rugby World Cup, World Rugby confirmed the qualification format for the twelve remaining places in August 2024. Of the twelve spots available, ten are decided by regional tournaments, one by a cross-regional playoff and the last one via a final qualification tournament.

=== Africa ===
Rugby Africa was granted one place at the World Cup via qualification, which was awarded at the conclusion of the third round of the African qualification process; the 2025 Africa Cup, where the winners, Zimbabwe qualified for the World Cup for the first time in 36 years as Africa 1. The runner-up, Namibia (Africa 2), advanced to an Asia / Africa play-off match against Asia 2, the United Arab Emirates, to decide who progresses to the Final Qualification Tournament. Namibia failed to qualify from the Final Qualification Tournament after one win from their three matches.

=== Asia ===
For the first time since 2015, Asia Rugby was granted one place at the World Cup through the qualification process, meaning a new team from Asia was guaranteed a spot in the World Cup. The team was decided through a three-round phased process, with the winner of the third round; the 2025 Asia Rugby Championship, Hong Kong China, qualifying for the World Cup for the first time as Asia 1. The runner-up, the United Arab Emirates (Asia 2), advanced to an Asia / Africa play-off match against Africa 2 for a place in the Final Qualification Tournament, which they lost to Namibia.

=== Europe ===
Rugby Europe gained four World Cup spots through a one-round competition; the 2025 Rugby Europe Championship, where the top four teams qualified for the World Cup as Europe 1, 2, 3 and 4, with those respectively being Georgia, Spain, Romania, and Portugal. The fifth placed team, Belgium, advanced to the Final Qualification Tournament.

Belgium failed to qualify from the Final Qualification Tournament after two wins and a draw from their three matches, losing out by one bonus point.

=== Pacific ===
The World Rugby Pacific Nations Cup was relaunched in 2024, and the Tier 3 sides in Rugby Americas North and Oceania Rugby not invited to the World Cup qualifying. Therefore, the qualification process for Oceania, North America and Japan (Asia) was merged for the 2027 Men's Rugby World Cup qualification process to create a one-round qualification process. Three places will be decided during the 2025 World Rugby Pacific Nations Cup, with the top three teams outside of Fiji and Japan, qualifying for the World Cup as Pacific 1, 2 and 3. Those spots respectively being awarded to Tonga, Canada, USA. The sixth remaining team in the competition, Samoa, advanced to a Pacific / Sudamérica qualifying play-off series against Sudamérica 2, for a chance to qualify for the World Cup as the Pacific / Sudamérica qualifying play-off winner. The loser of the South America / Pacific play-off advanced to the Final Qualification Tournament.

Samoa qualified from the Final Qualification Tournament after two wins and a draw from their three matches, going through by one bonus point.

=== South America ===
In a first, Sudamérica will gain an automatic place in the World Cup through the qualification process, which will be awarded at the conclusion of the third round of the South American qualification process. The winners of the final round will qualify for the World Cup as Sudamérica 1, whilst the runner-up (Sudamérica 2) advances to a Pacific / Sudamérica play-off series against Pacific 4, for a chance to qualify for the World Cup as the Pacific / Sudamérica play-off winner. The loser of the play-off advances to the Final Qualification Tournament. The third placed team (Sudamérica 3) advanced to the Final Qualification Tournament.

Brazil failed to qualify from the Final Qualification Tournament after no wins from their three matches.

== Play-offs and Final Qualification Tournament ==
Following the regional tournaments, the next qualification stage was two cross-regional play-off matches.

The first cross-regional play-off was an Asia / Africa play-off match, which was contested between the United Arab Emirates (Asia 2) and Namibia (Africa 2). The winner of the play-off (Namibia) advanced to the Final Qualification Tournament, whilst the loser was eliminated.

The second cross-regional play-off was a Pacific / Sudamérica play-off series between Samoa (Pacific 4) and Chile (Sudamérica 2). The winner of the play-off on aggregate, (Chile) qualified for the World Cup as the Pacific / Sudamérica play-off winner. The play-off loser (Samoa) advanced to the Final Qualification Tournament.

The final stage of the qualification process took place in Dubai from 8 to 18 November 2025, with a four-teamed round-robin competition forming the Final Qualification Tournament.

The first team to qualify for the FQT was Belgium (Europe 5) after finishing in fifth spot in Europe. Namibia (Asia / Africa play-off winner) were the next team to qualify for the FQT after initially advancing to a play-off as Africa 2, before beating the United Arab Emirates to earn a spot in the FQT. The third team to qualify was Samoa, who lost the Pacific/Sudamérica play-off. The final side to qualify was Paraguay (Sudamérica 3) after beating Brazil in the Sudamérica 3 play-off matches. However, after it was later discovered that Paraguay had fielded an ineligible player during those matches, and therefore withdrew and were replaced by Brazil in the FQT.

The Final Qualification Tournament saw Samoa progress with two wins and a draw. Belgium were second, also with two wins and a draw, but lost by a bonus point. Namibia were third with one win, and Brazil fourth with no wins. failed to qualify from the Final Qualification Tournament after one win from their three matches.

== See also ==
- 2027 Men's Rugby World Cup
