= Sydney Football Stadium (2022) =

Multi-purpose stadium in Moore Park, New South Wales, Australia

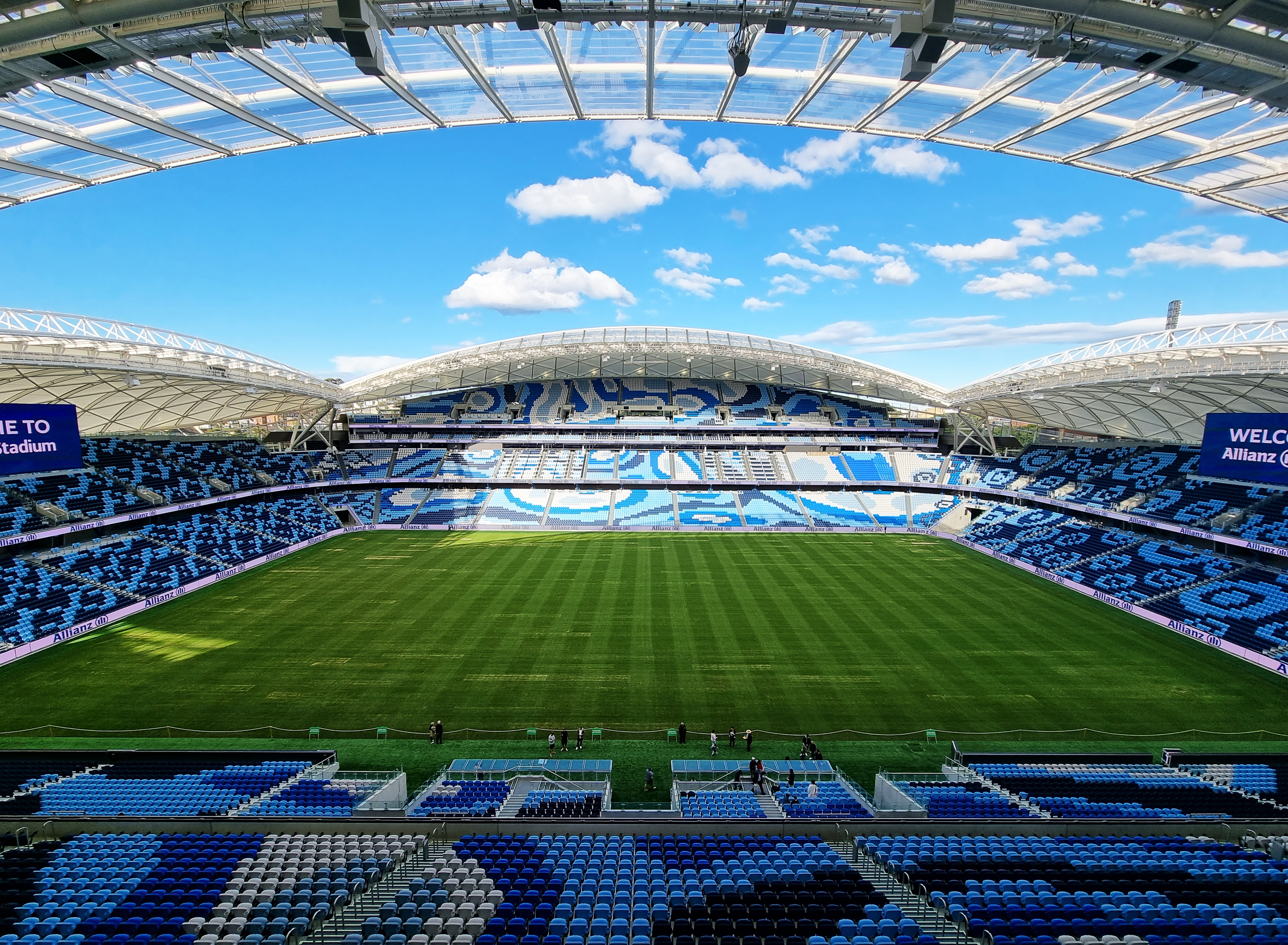
- Allianz Stadium in August 2022
- Interactive map of Sydney Football Stadium
- Full name: Sydney Football Stadium
- Address: 40–44 Driver Avenue; Moore Park; Australia
- Coordinates: 33°53′21″S 151°13′31″E
- Owner: Government of New South Wales
- Operator: Venues NSW
- Capacity: 42,500
- Type: Multi-purpose stadium
- Events: Sporting events; Concerts
- Surface: Grass
- Scoreboard: Yes
- Record attendance: 41,971 (Wallabies v Ireland, 4 July 2026)
- Field shape: Rectangular
- Public transit: Moore Park; Moore Park

Construction
- Groundbreaking: 15 April 2020; 6 years ago
- Opened: 28 August 2022; 4 years ago
- Cost: $828 million
- Architect: Cox Architecture
- General contractor: John Holland

Tenant
- Sydney Roosters Sydney FC NSW Waratahs South Sydney Rabbitohs: (2022–present) (2022–present) (2022–present) (2026–present)

Website
- allianzstadium.com.au

Sydney Football Stadium (known under naming rights as Allianz Stadium) is a stadium located in the Sydney suburb of Moore Park. It is primarily used for rugby league, rugby union, and soccer as the home ground of the Sydney Roosters in the National Rugby League (NRL), the New South Wales Waratahs in Super Rugby, and Sydney FC in the A-League Men.

The stadium was opened in 2022 as a replacement for the original stadium of the same name. The stadium was constructed over a 3-year period with a total build cost of $828 million. It has a capacity of 42,500 spectators. The stadium is owned by the NSW Government and is operated by Venues NSW. Multi-national insurance and finance company Allianz operate the naming rights to the stadium.

The stadium was used as a venue in the 2023 FIFA Women’s World Cup hosting six games in total. It is also planned to be used as a venue in the 2026 Rugby League World Cup, the 2027 Rugby World Cup, and will host football preliminaries in the 2032 Summer Olympics. The stadium has also hosted special events and concerts.

== History ==
The site was in the last half of the 19th century a military rifle range associated with Victoria Barracks. The land had in 1811 been part of the 'Sydney Common' dedication (now Centennial Parklands) granted to the city by NSW Governor Lachlan Macquarie. In 1899 the site was returned to the NSW government and the Sydney Sports Ground was opened in 1903. In 1988 this ground was replaced by the original Sydney Football Stadium.

In October 2018 plans for the new stadium to replace the original Sydney Football Stadium were released by the Government of New South Wales. In December 2018 Lendlease were appointed to build the stadium. Construction was initially scheduled to commence in 2019 with an early 2022 completion date. In July 2019 the construction part of the Lendlease contract was cancelled by the government, with John Holland and Multiplex shortlisted to bid for the contract. In December 2019 John Holland was awarded a $735 million construction contract, representing a $99 million increase in the original budget for demolition and construction. The total construction cost was $828 million.

The stadium was opened on 28 August 2022. Guy Sebastian performed on the opening night after a free community open day. Bruno Mars performed two concerts as part of his 2022-24 tour on 14 and 15 October 2022. Elton John performed two shows on his global farewell tour in Allianz Stadium on 17 and 18 January 2023.

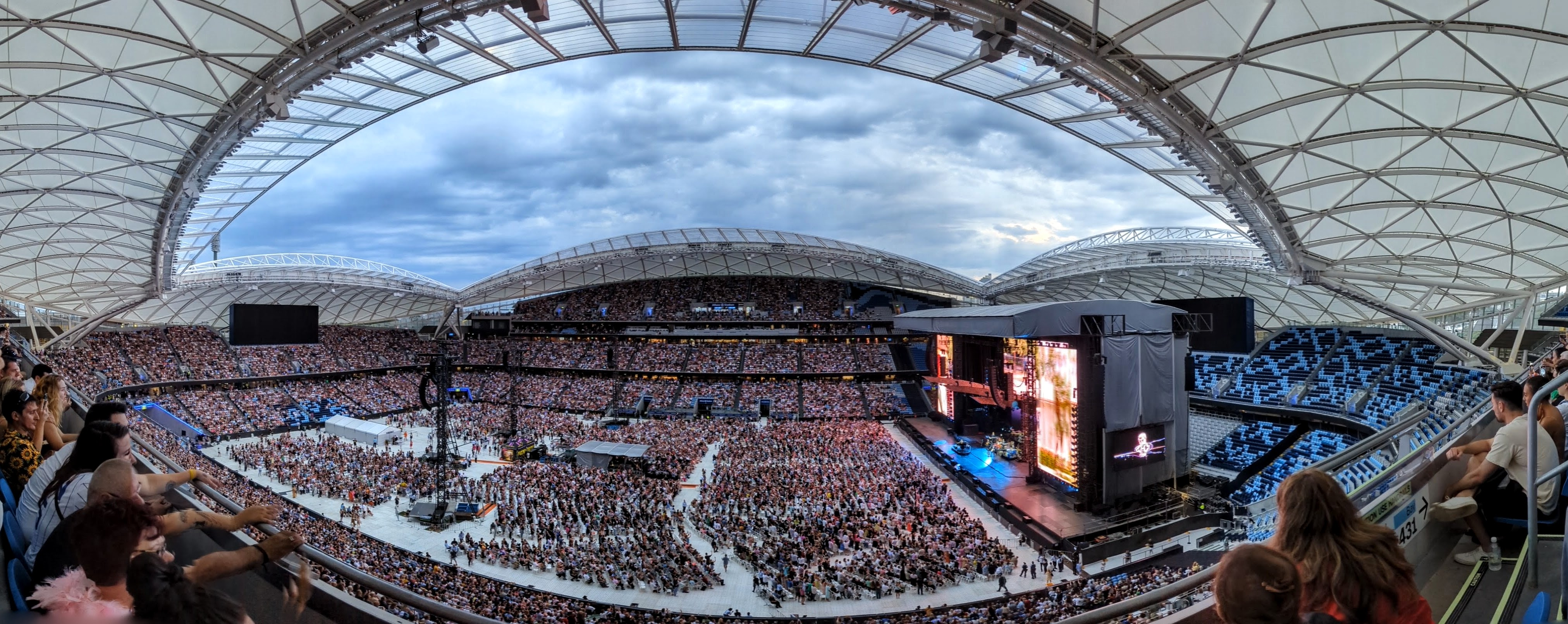
Elton John performing in his Farewell Tour at Allianz Stadium, 18 January 2023

In August 2025, it became known that the stadium had drainage issues which caused a ten week closure of the site.

== Construction ==
Demolition of the previous stadium began on 8 March 2019. Opposition from local interest groups saw them attempt to prevent or slow the demolition via legal action before the 2019 New South Wales state election. After a short court-ordered delay just prior to the election, the existing Government was returned and the demolition of the old stadium continued through to completion on 18 December 2019 at a cost of $40 million.

Construction of the stadium commenced on 15 April 2020 by John Holland, with major piling and excavation works beginning the following month. By the end of 2020 work on the structure had commenced on all four sides of the new venue, which included the main lift cores and precast placement works which would make up the main seating area. Following this the main formwork contractors commenced to allow the slabs to be poured for the main back of house areas. The first seats were installed on 27 October 2021.

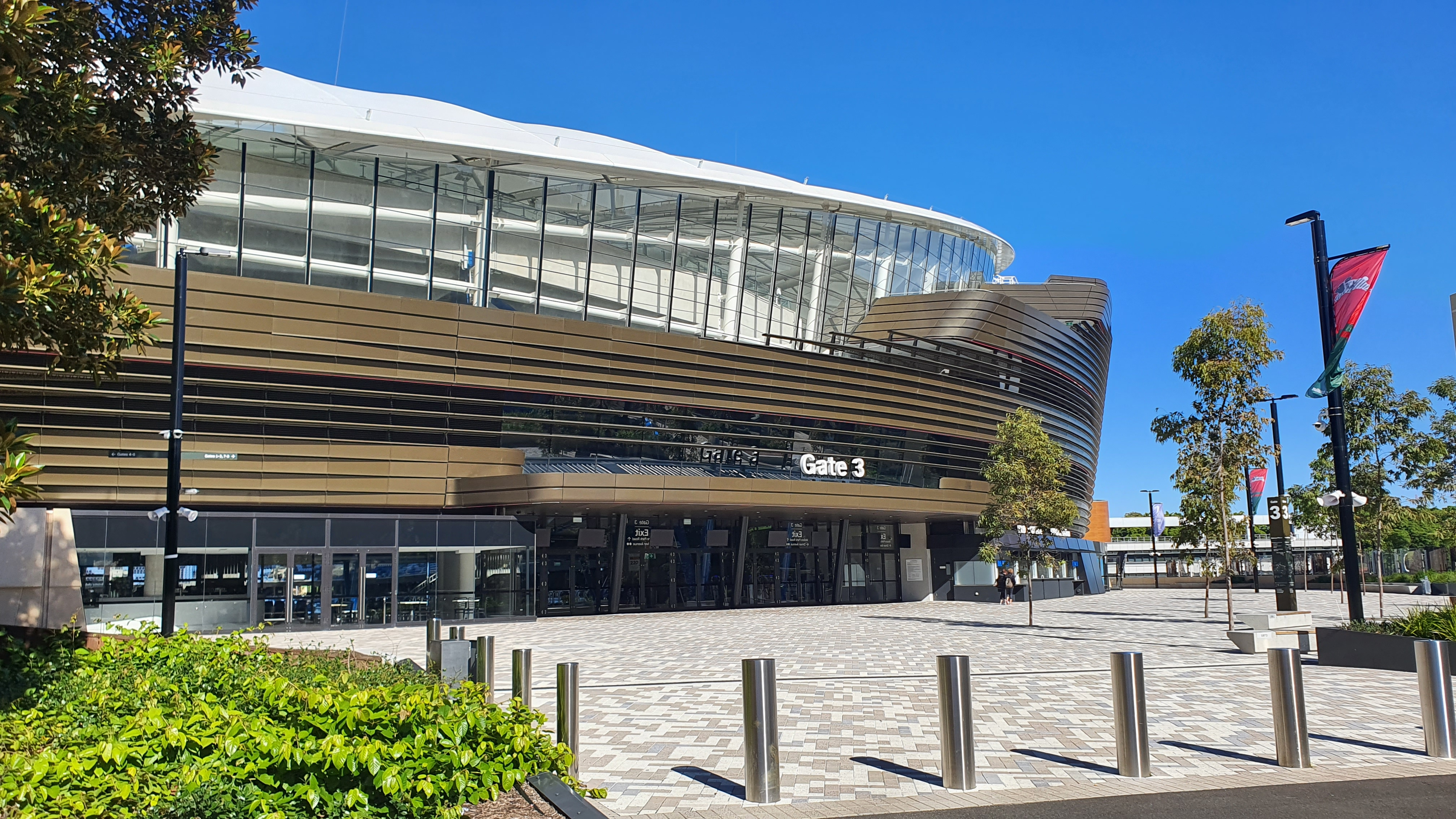
External view of the stadium

== Additional facilities and membership ==
Colocated with the Stadium but constructed under a separate contract is the Sporting Club of Sydney. This is a premium gym and wellness centre including gymnasiums, squash courts, pools, sauna and spas.

Various memberships are available that provide access to the SCG, Allianz Stadium and the fitness and lifestyle facilities. SCG Members do not have access to Allianz Stadium nor the fitness and lifestyle facilities.

Members have access to dedicated seating, bars and restaurants within the stadium.

Various Tenant Clubs also offer membership to their home games at the stadium. These seats are generally in public areas other than Tunnel and Clubhouse memberships offered by Sydney FC.

Just like the Western Sydney Stadium, the SFS also has dual configuration safe standing to be used by active support. Quick removal seating blocks are able to be switched out for standing rails in the three bays of the Northern end.

== Political and contractual issues ==
The demolition and rebuild of the stadium was an issue in the 2019 New South Wales state election. The opposition Labor Party opposed the rebuild. The election was won by the incumbent government and the Sydney Football Stadium rebuild continued post-election.

In December 2018, Lendlease was unveiled as the successful bidder to carry out the demolition and construction work. Minister for Sport Stuart Ayres was quizzed over how the contract for construction could be awarded, because development consent had not been secured for stage two.

On 26 July 2019, Minister for Sport, Multiculturalism, Seniors and Veterans John Sidoti, announced Lendlease would not be constructing the new stadium because it was unable to complete the $729 million project within budget. At this stage demolition was mostly complete and it appeared the original contract was a fixed price option for the construction phase. John Holland took over the project after Lendlease declined to continue.

== Attendance records ==
Below is a table of the Sydney Football stadium's attendance records for each sport or event. As of 27 August 2026

Type	Date	Home team	Opponent	Crowd Figure	Ref
Rugby Union	4 July 2026	Australia Wallabies	Ireland	41,971	
Rugby League (NRL)	2 September 2022	Sydney Roosters	South Sydney Rabbitohs	41,906	
Concert	18 October 2024	Travis Scott		41,814	
Rugby League (International)	8 November 2026	Australia	Samoa	41,529	
Soccer (Women)	30 July 2023	Germany	Colombia	40,499	
Soccer (Men)	15 July 2025	(Australia) Sydney FC	(Wales) Wrexham AFC	40,242	

== 2023 FIFA Women's World Cup fixtures ==
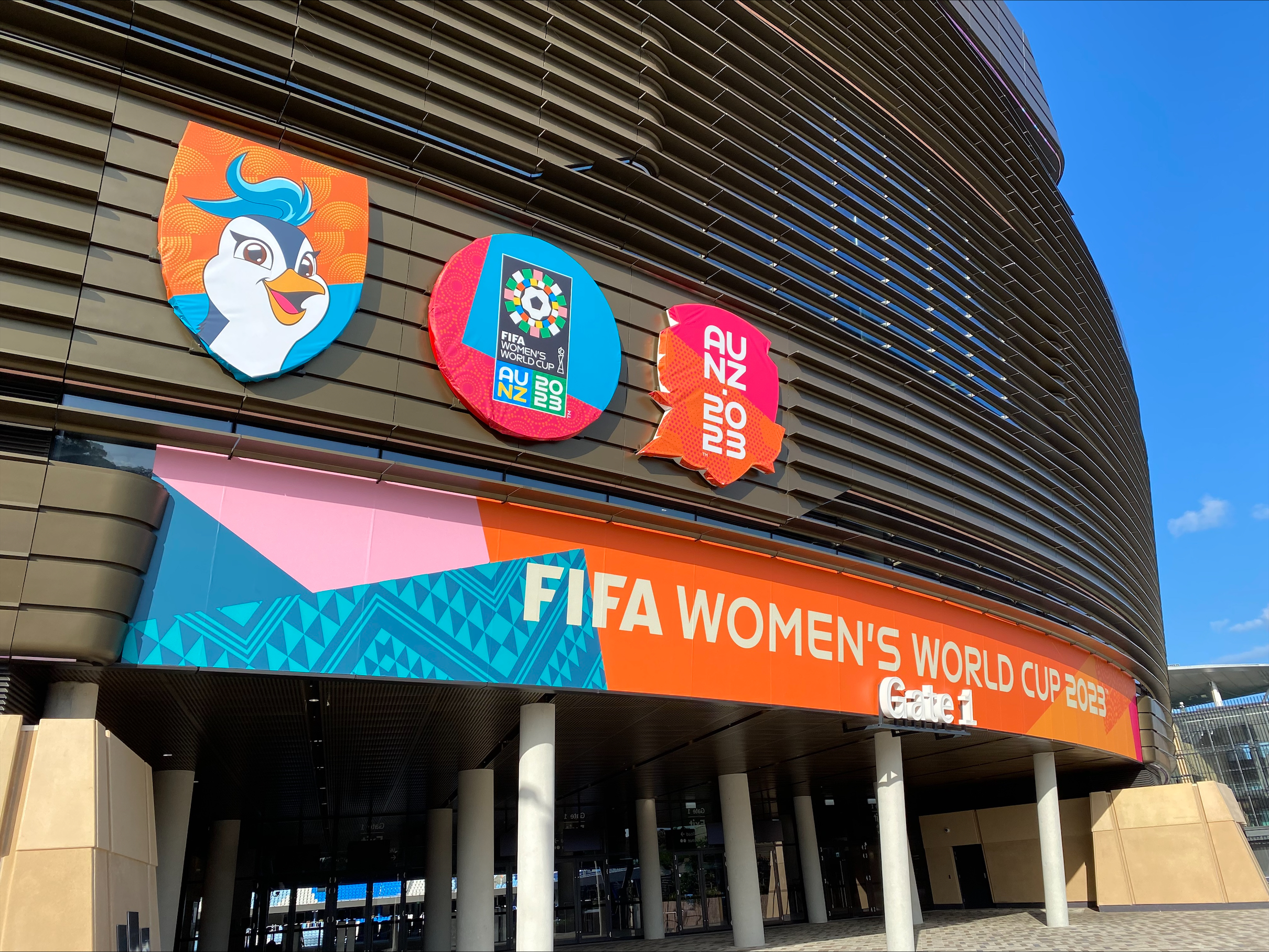
Sydney Football Stadium during the 2023 FIFA Women's World Cup

Date	Team #1	Result	Team #2	Round	Attendance
23 July 2023	France	0–0	Jamaica	Group F	39,045
25 July 2023	Colombia	2–0	South Korea	Group H	24,323
28 July 2023	England	1–0	Denmark	Group D	40,439
30 July 2023	Germany	1–2	Colombia	Group H	40,499
2 August 2023	Panama	3–6	France	Group F	40,498
6 August 2023	Netherlands	2–0	South Africa	Round of 16	40,233

== 2026 Rugby League World Cup matches ==
Date	Team #1	Result	Team #2	Round	Attendance
15 October 2026	Australia	24–22	New Zealand	Pool A	41,255
8 November 2026	Australia	–	Fiji	Women Semi Final	
8 November 2026	Australia	–	Samoa	Men Semi Final	41,529

== 2027 Men's Rugby World Cup matches ==
Date	Team #1	Result	Team #2	Round	Attendance
4 October 2027	Ireland		Portugal	Pool D	
11 October 2027	Italy		Romania	Pool B	
17 October 2027	France		Samoa	Pool E	
23 October 2027	2nd Pool C		2nd Pool F	Round of 16	
24 October 2027	1st Pool C		3rd Pool A/E/F	Round of 16	

== See also ==
- List of soccer stadiums in Australia
- Lists of stadiums
