= List of television stations in the Solomon Islands =

== List of television stations in Solomon Islands ==
This is a list of television stations in Solomon Islands

=== Telekom Television Ltd ===
(TTV) is the Solomon Islands main television network. TTV is a free-to-air, commercial television network, located in Honiara. The company was founded in March 2008 with the first broadcast transmission occurring in July 1992, under a temporary permit to carry the 1992 Summer Olympics held in Barcelona.

TTV is a wholly owned subsidiary of Solomon Telekom Co. Ltd (STCL). STCL operates under the brand name - Our Telekom.

TTV broadcasts SD analogue and HD digital (DVB-T) channels in the VHF/UHF frequency bands. The HD channels, available in Honiara, are a mixture of overseas sport, news and entertainments channels.

The SD analogue channels are relayed to five other locations in four of the Solomons nine Provinces.

TTV conforms to the Australian television transmission standards.

TTV 1 is also streamed online (as Programme Rights allow) and is accessible via the Our Telekom mobile network throughout the Solomons. The service is Geoblocked to the Solomons.

==== History ====
The first free-to-air television (FTA) transmission was broadcast by Our Telekom in July 1992, when the Barcelona Olympic Games was transmitted from a low-powered VHF transmitter located in Honiara.

In June 1994 Our Telekom gained the FTA TV broadcast rights for the FIFA World Football World Cup. Our Telekom and TTV gain rights for all its broadcast content and has long since stood against any form of piracy of programming.

In 2006 One News Limited, a privately owned company was established to operate FTA TV to produce programmes in Pidgin and English including local news, sport, entertainment, educational programmes. Our Telekom supported One News (later known as One TV) by permitting it to broadcast on its VHF channel.

In March 2008 Our Telekom formed the wholly owned Telekom Television Ltd and gave the company a mandate to plan and develop FTA television across the Solomon Islands.

In 2016 the first Parliamentary broadcast was aired. Transmission of HD digital services also commenced in Honiara. Over subsequent years, more services have been added to the network.

Solomon Island TV Channels
Channel Name	Broadcaster	D = digital, A = analogue	Channel	Where available
TTV 1	TTV	A		Honaira, Gizo, Noro, Munda, Auki, Lata
TTV 2	TTV	A		Honaira, Gizo, Noro, Auki
TTV 3	TTV	A		Honiara
TTV 1	TTV	D	1	Honiara
TTV 2	TTV	D	2	Honiara
TTV 3	TTV	D	3	Honiara
ESPN 1	TTV	D	12	Honiara
Pasifika TV	TTV	D	13, 30	Honiara
NHK	TTV	D	14, 26	Honiara
BBC	TTV	D	21	Honiara
Al Jazeera	TTV	D	22	Honiara
DWTV	TTV	D	23	Honiara
France 24	TTV	D	24	Honiara
EWTN	TTV	D	25	Honiara
CNA	TTV	D	27	Honiara
ABC Australia	TTV	D	28	Honiara
CGTN	TTV	D	29	Honiara

=== See also ===
Australasian television frequencies
