= 2027 Men's Rugby World Cup Pool A =

Pool A of the 2027 Men's Rugby World Cup will begin on Friday 1 October and conclude on Saturday 16 October. The pool includes hosts and two-time champions Australia, Chile, three-time champions New Zealand, and debutants Hong Kong.

== Teams ==
The draw for the pool stage was held on 3 December 2025 in Sydney. The World Rugby Rankings as of 1 December 2025 determined four bands of six teams, and a team from each band was randomly drawn into Pool A, B, C, D, E or F. Australia was the only exception, having been automatically placed into Pool A as hosts.

The first team to qualify from Pool A, aside from the host nation, was New Zealand. New Zealand successfully qualified for the 2027 Rugby World Cup on 5 October 2023 after defeating Uruguay 73–0 during their 2023 Rugby World Cup Pool A match-up. This victory sealed their qualification on the final matchday having been equal on points with Italy. It is the first time in the Rugby World Cup that has featured both Australia and New Zealand in the same pool. The two have previously met in the knockout stages of the 1991, 2003, 2011, and 2015 Rugby World Cups, the latter being in the Final.

Hong Kong were the third team to qualify from Pool A. With Japan having already qualified for the 2027 Rugby World Cup via the 2023 Rugby World Cup pool stage, and the new restructuring of the qualification format by World Rugby, Hong Kong were positioned as a top contender for the only slot from Asia's qualification tournament, the Asia Rugby Championship (ARC). Played across three pool matches, Hong Kong sealed their first-ever qualification on 5 July 2025 in a 22–70 victory over South Korea. Hong Kong became the second team from Asia (after Japan) to compete at a Rugby World Cup.

The final team to qualify for the Rugby World Cup from Pool A was South America's third qualifier, Chile. They played the most fixtures in pursuit of a qualification spot of any of the other teams in the pool, totaling eight matches across 364 days. They began their qualification process in the pool stage of the second round of South American qualifiers. They played host to Paraguay and Brazil, defeating both teams comfortably and advanced to the third round. In the third round Chile played Brazil in a two-legged play-off, and won both matches with a combined aggregate of 70–41. They then played another two-legged play-off match against Uruguay for the only South American qualifier spot. Chile lost the first leg on home soil and won the second leg in Montevideo. However, they lost on aggregate 37–46. Chile then advanced to the two-legged Pacific/Sudamérica qualifying play-off against Samoa. Drawing the first match 32-all, Chile won the second leg on 27 September 2025 31–12 to secure their second berth at the Rugby World Cup.

Pos.	Team	Band	Confederation	Method of qualification	Date of qualification	Apps.	Last	Previous best performance	World Rugby Rankings	
Pos.	Team	Band	Confederation	Method of qualification	Date of qualification	Apps.	Last	Previous best performance	1 December 2025 (Note: The final rankings as of 1 December 2025 were used for the draw.)	27 September 2027 (Note: The final rankings before the first match of the tournament.)
A1	New Zealand	1	Pacific (Oceania)	2023 Rugby World Cup pool stage	5 October 2023	11	2023	Champions (1987, 2011, 2015)	2	
A2	Australia	2	Pacific (Oceania)	Hosts	12 May 2022	11	2023	Champions (1991, 1999)	7	
A3	Chile	3	South America	Pacific/Sudamérica play-off winner	27 September 2025	2	2023	Pool stage (2023)	17	
A4	Hong Kong	4	Asia	Asia Rugby Championship winner	5 July 2025	1	Debut	—	23	

== Standings ==
Pos	Team	Pld	W	D	L	PF	PA	PD	TF	TA	TB	LB	Pts	Qualification
1	New Zealand	0	0	0	0	0	0	0	0	0	0	0	0	Advance to knockout stage
2	Australia (H)	0	0	0	0	0	0	0	0	0	0	0	0	Advance to knockout stage
3	Chile	0	0	0	0	0	0	0	0	0	0	0	0	Possible knockout stage based on ranking
4	Hong Kong	0	0	0	0	0	0	0	0	0	0	0	0	

First match(es) will be played: 1 October 2027. Source: World Rugby
Rules for classification: Pool stage tiebreakers
(H) Host

== Matches ==
=== Australia v Hong Kong ===
1 October 2027
18:45 AWST (UTC+08)

Australia	v	Hong Kong

Perth Stadium, Perth

Notes:

- This will be Hong Kong's Rugby World Cup debut match, and it will be the first meeting between Australia and Hong Kong.

=== New Zealand v Chile ===
2 October 2027
13:15 AWST (UTC+08)

New Zealand	v	Chile

Perth Stadium, Perth

Notes:

- This is the first meeting between New Zealand and Chile.

=== New Zealand v Australia ===
9 October 2027
17:10 AEDT (UTC+11)

New Zealand	v	Australia

Stadium Australia, Sydney

Notes:

- This is the first meeting between New Zealand and Australia in a Rugby World Cup pool stage match.

=== Chile v Hong Kong ===
9 October 2027
20:15 AEST (UTC+10)

Chile	v	Hong Kong

North Queensland Stadium, Townsville

=== New Zealand v Hong Kong ===
15 October 2027
17:15 AEDT (UTC+11)

New Zealand	v	Hong Kong

Docklands Stadium, Melbourne

Notes:

- This is the first meeting between New Zealand and Hong Kong.

=== Australia v Chile ===
16 October 2027
15:10 AEST (UTC+10)

Australia	v	Chile

Brisbane Stadium, Brisbane

Notes:

- This is the first meeting between Australia and Chile.

== See also ==
- History of rugby union matches between Australia and New Zealand
