= 2025 Rugby Europe Championship =

- Date: 31 January – 16 March 2025
- Countries: Belgium; Georgia; Germany; Netherlands; Portugal; Romania; Spain; Switzerland

Tournament statistics
- Champions: Georgia (17th title)
- Antim Cup: Georgia (19th title)
- Matches played: 20
- Attendance: 88,575 (4,429 per match)
- Tries scored: 164 (8.2 per match)
- Top point scorer(s): (Spain) Gonzalo López-Bontempo (69 points)
- Top try scorer(s): (Georgia (country)) Aka Tabutsadze (9 Tries)
- Player of the tournament: (Spain) Gonzalo López-Bontempo

2027 Rugby World Cup – Europe qualification
Tournament details
- Dates: 31 January 2025 – 16 March 2025
- No. of nations: 8

Tournament statistics
- Matches played: 20

The 2025 Rugby Europe Championship was the ninth Rugby Europe Championship, the annual rugby union competition for the top European national teams outside the Six Nations Championship, and the 54th edition of the competition. (Note: including all its previous incarnations as the FIRA Tournament, Rugby Union European Cup, FIRA Nations Cup, FIRA Trophy, and European Nations Cup) The tournament doubled as the qualifying process for the 2027 Men's Rugby World Cup.

Eight teams took part in the 2024 championship: Belgium, Georgia, Germany, the Netherlands, Poland, Portugal, Romania and Spain. Georgia won the previous championship after defeating Portugal in the final, claiming their 16th title. Poland were relegated. After winning the 2023–24 Rugby Europe Trophy, Switzerland were promoted to the Championship for the 2025 season. This was the first time in their history that they are in the top division.

The serpentine system was applied to allocate each team to their respective groups. Each team plays a total of five games (three round robin group matches to determine the team's path and two play-off matches). Seeding (for a group) and relegation are calculated over a two-year cycle, as is the promotion from the Trophy competition.

== World Cup qualification format ==
This year's edition of the Rugby Europe Championship doubles as the year of the 2027 Rugby World Cup qualifiers for the European region. The top two sides from each pool will qualify for the Rugby World Cup, with the final & bronze final acting as seeding matches to seed the team Europe 1–4. The Ranking Finals will then act as the play-off to determine Europe 5, who will advance to the final qualification tournament.

Eight teams competed during the European qualifiers for the 2027 Rugby World Cup, with England, France, Ireland, Italy, Scotland and Wales already qualified from the Region prior to the qualification process.

(Rankings as of first qualification match in this region)

Nation	Rank	Began play	Qualifying status
Belgium	27	1 February 2025	Advances to Final Qualification Tournament on 15 March 2025
England	4	N/A	Qualified with Top 12 finish at 2023 World Cup
France	3	N/A	Qualified with Top 12 finish at 2023 World Cup
Georgia	12	1 February 2025	Qualified on 9 February 2025 / as Europe 1 on 16 March 2025
Germany	32	31 January 2025	Eliminated by Netherlands on 1 March 2025
Ireland	7	N/A	Qualified with Top 12 finish at 2023 World Cup
Italy	15	N/A	Qualified with Top 12 finish at 2023 World Cup
Netherlands	26	2 February 2025	Eliminated by Belgium on 15 March 2025
Portugal	15	1 February 2025	Qualified on 9 February 2025 / as Europe 4 on 16 March 2025
Romania	20	31 January 2025	Qualified on 9 February 2025 / as Europe 3 on 16 March 2025
Scotland	8	N/A	Qualified with Top 12 finish at 2023 World Cup
Spain	18	2 February 2025	Qualified on 9 February 2025 / as Europe 2 on 16 March 2025
Switzerland	28	1 February 2025	Eliminated by Belgium on 1 March 2025
Wales	5	N/A	Qualified with Top 12 finish at 2023 World Cup

== Participants ==
Nation	Stadium			Head coach	Captain
Nation	Home stadium	Capacity	Location	Head coach	Captain
Belgium	Stade Charles Tondreau; Stade du Pachy	8,000; 3,000	Mons; Waterloo	(France) Laurent Dossat	Jens Torfs
Georgia	Avchala Stadium; Mikheil Meskhi Stadium	3,500; 27,223	Tbilisi	(England) Richard Cockerill	Vasil Lobzhanidze
Germany	Auestadion; Fritz-Grunebaum-Sportpark	18,737; 5,000	Kassel; Heidelberg	(Germany) Mark Kuhlmann	Jörn Schröder
Netherlands	NRCA Stadium	7,000	Amsterdam	(Wales) Lyn Jones	Hugo Langelaan
Portugal	Estádio do Restelo; Estádio Nacional	19,856; 37,593	Lisbon; Oeiras	(New Zealand) Simon Mannix	Tomás Appleton
Romania	Arcul de Triumf Stadium; Botoșani Municipal Stadium	8,207; 7,782	Bucharest; Botoșani	(France) David Gérard	Ovidiu Cojocaru
Spain	Estadio Nacional Complutense	12,400	Madrid	(Argentina) Pablo Bouza	Jon Zabala
Switzerland	Stade Municipal Yverdon	6,600	Yverdon-les-Bains	(France) Olivier Nier	Cyril Lin

== Tables and fixtures ==
=== Pool A ===
Pos	Team	Pld	W	D	L	PF	PA	PD	TF	TA	TB	LB	Pts	Qualification
1	Georgia	3	3	0	0	212	39	+173	32	5	3	0	15	Grand Finals Semi-finals
2	Spain	3	2	0	1	128	99	+29	18	14	2	0	10	Grand Finals Semi-finals
3	Netherlands	3	1	0	2	104	93	+11	17	13	1	0	5	Ranking Finals Semi-finals
4	Switzerland	3	0	0	3	13	226	−213	1	36	0	0	0	Ranking Finals Semi-finals

Source: Rugby Europe
Rules for classification:
If two teams have the same number of points the best ranked will be: 1) match points in the games played between the tied Unions; 2) tries in the games played between the tied Unions; 3) match points difference in all pool games; 4) tries for in all pool games; 5) match points for in all pool games.
If three or more teams have same number of points, the best ranked will be: 1) match points difference in all pool games; 2) tries for in all pool games; 4) match points for in all pool games.
Points were awarded to the teams as follows: Win – 4 points, Draw – 2 points, At least 3 more tries than opponent – 1 point, Loss within 7 points – 1 point

==== Week 1 ====
1 February 2025
16:00 GET (UTC+4)

(1 TBP) Georgia	110–0	Switzerland
	Report

Avchala Stadium, Tbilisi
Attendance: 3,500
Referee: Luis Fernandez (Spain)

2 February 2025
12:45 CET (UTC+1)

(1 TBP) Spain	53–24	Netherlands
	Report

Estadio Nacional Complutense, Madrid
Attendance: 7,000
Referee: Sam Grove-White (Scotland)

==== Week 2 ====
8 February 2025
15:00 GET (UTC+4)

(1 TBP) Georgia	40–7	Netherlands
	Report

Avchala Stadium, Tbilisi
Attendance: 2,000
Referee: Benoit Rousselet (France)

9 February 2025
14:00 CET (UTC+1)

Switzerland	13–43	Spain (1 TBP)
	Report

Stade Municipal, Yverdon-les-Bains
Attendance: 3,800
Referee: Nicolae Fratila (Romania)

==== Week 3 ====
15 February 2025
13:00 CET (UTC+1)

(1 TBP) Netherlands	73–0	Switzerland
	Report

NRCA Stadium, Amsterdam
Attendance: 2,500
Referee: Paulo Duarte (Portugal)

16 February 2025
12:45 CET (UTC+1)

Spain	32–62	Georgia (1 TBP)
	Report

Estadio Nacional Complutense, Madrid
Attendance: 6,000
Referee: Eoghan Cross (Ireland)

=== Pool B ===
Pos	Team	Pld	W	D	L	PF	PA	PD	TF	TA	TB	LB	Pts	Qualification
1	Portugal	3	3	0	0	130	50	+80	19	5	3	0	15	Grand Finals Semi-finals
2	Romania	3	2	0	1	85	58	+27	9	8	1	0	9	Grand Finals Semi-finals
3	Belgium	3	1	0	2	83	90	−7	10	12	0	0	4	Ranking Finals Semi-finals
4	Germany	3	0	0	3	43	143	−100	6	19	0	0	0	Ranking Finals Semi-finals

Source: Rugby Europe
Rules for classification:
If two teams have the same number of points the best ranked will be: 1) match points in the games played between the tied Unions; 2) tries in the games played between the tied Unions; 3) match points difference in all pool games; 4) tries difference for in all pool games; 5) match points for in all pool games.
If three or more teams have same number of points, the best ranked will be: 1) match points difference in all pool games; 2) tries for in all pool games; 4) match points for in all pool games.
Points were awarded to the teams as follows: Win – 4 points, Draw – 2 points, At least 3 more tries than opponent – 1 point, Loss within 7 points – 1 point

==== Week 1 ====
31 January 2025
18:00 EET (UTC+2)

(1TBP) Romania	48–10	Germany
	Report

Arcul de Triumf Stadium, Bucharest
Attendance: 4,200
Referee: Franco Rosella (Italy)

1 February 2025
19:30 WET (UTC+0)

(1 TBP) Portugal	40–30	Belgium
	Report

Estádio do Restelo, Lisbon
Attendance: 4,000
Referee: Shota Tevzadze (Georgia)

==== Week 2 ====
8 February 2025
20:00 CET (UTC+1)

Belgium	14–31	Romania
	Report

Stade Charles Tondreau, Mons
Attendance: 5,400
Referee: Hollie Davidson (Scotland)

9 February 2025
17:15 WET (UTC+0)

(1 TBP) Portugal	56–14	Germany
	Report

Estádio do Restelo, Lisbon
Attendance: 7,000
Referee: Keane Davison (Ireland)

==== Week 3 ====
15 February 2025
17:00 EET (UTC+2)

Romania	6–34	Portugal (1 TBP)
	Report

Botoșani Municipal Stadium, Botoșani
Attendance: 3,000
Referee: Ludovic Cayre (France)

16 February 2025
15:30 CET (UTC+1)

Germany	19–39	Belgium
	Report

Auestadion, Kassel
Attendance: 5,500
Referee: Saba Abulashvili (Georgia)

== Ranking Finals ==
The winner of this bracket will advance to the Final Qualification Tournament for the 2027 Men's Rugby World Cup and World Rugby Nations Championship's second division.

Semi-finals
1 March – NRCA Stadium, Amsterdam
Netherlands	38
Germany	9
1 March – Stade du Pachy, Waterloo
Belgium	38
Switzerland	5

Fifth-place Final
15 March – NRCA Stadium, Amsterdam
Netherlands	10
Belgium	31
Seventh-place Final
15 March – Fritz-Grunebaum-Sportpark, Heidelberg
Germany	17
Switzerland	20

=== Semi-finals ===
1 March 2025
13:00 CET (UTC+1)

Netherlands	38–9	Germany
	Report

NRCA Stadium, Amsterdam
Attendance: 2,500
Referee: Shota Tevzadze (Georgia)

1 March 2025
20:00 CET (UTC+1)

Belgium	38–5	Switzerland
	Report

Stade du Pachy, Waterloo
Attendance: 1,500
Referee: Alex Frasson (Italy)

=== Seventh-place final ===
15 March 2025
15:45 CET (UTC+1)

Germany	17–20	Switzerland
	Report

Fritz-Grunebaum-Sportpark, Heidelberg
Attendance: 1,200
Referee: Mike English (Wales)

=== Fifth-place final ===
15 March 2025
13:00 CET (UTC+1)

Netherlands	10–31	Belgium
	Report

NRCA Stadium, Amsterdam
Attendance: 4,500
Referee: Jeremy Rozier (France)

== Grand Finals ==
Semi-finals
1 March – Estádio Nacional, Oeiras
Portugal	31
Spain	42
2 March – Avchala Stadium, Tbilisi
Georgia	43
Romania	5

Cup Final
16 March – Mikheil Meskhi Stadium, Tbilisi
Georgia	46
Spain	28
Bronze Final
16 March – Estádio Nacional, Oeiras
Portugal	7
Romania	21

=== Semi-finals ===
1 March 2025
15:30 WET (UTC+0)

Portugal	31–42	Spain
	Report

Estádio Nacional, Oeiras
Attendance: 6,500
Referee: Adam Jones (Wales)

2 March 2025
15:00 GET (UTC+4)

Georgia	43–5	Romania
	Report

Avchala Stadium, Tbilisi
Attendance: 2,975
Referee: Peter Martin (Ireland)

=== Bronze Final ===
16 March 2025
15:00 WET (UTC+0)

Portugal	7–21	Romania
	Report

Estádio Nacional, Oeiras
Attendance: 600
Referee: Saba Abulashvili (Georgia)

=== Cup Final ===
16 March 2025
16:00 GET (UTC+4)

Georgia	46–28	Spain
Try: Karkadze (3) 22' m, 34' m, 49' m Tabutsadze (3) 37' c, 51' m, 73' m Abuladze 45' c Lobzhanidze 66' c Con: Papunashvili (3/7) 38', 46', 67'	Report	Try: Cian 25' c Nieto 70' m López-Bontempo 80' c Con: López-Bontempo (2/3) 26', 80'; Pen: López-Bontempo (3/4) 4', 18', 40'

Mikheil Meskhi Stadium, Tbilisi
Attendance: 14,900
Referee: Federico Vedovelli (Italy)

Team details

FB	15	Dachi Papunashvili	(substituted off) 71'
RW	14	Aka Tabutsadze
OC	13	Georges Shvelidze	(substituted off) 54'
IC	12	Tornike Kakhoidze
LW	11	Alexander Todua
FH	10	Davit Niniashvili
SH	9	Vasil Lobzhanidze	(substituted off) 67'
N8	8	Beka Gorgadze	(substituted off) 63'
OF	7	Beka Saghinadze (c)
BF	6	Luka Ivanishvili
RL	5	Lado Chachanidze	(substituted off) 67'
LL	4	Mikheil Babunashvili
TP	3	Luka Japaridze	(substituted off) 51'
HK	2	Vano Karkadze	(substituted off) 52'
LP	1	Nika Abuladze	(substituted off) 53'
Substitutions:
HK	16	Irakli Kvatadze	(substituted on) 52'
PR	17	Giorgi Akhaladze	(substituted on) 53'
PR	18	Irakli Aptsiauri	(substituted on) 51'
LK	19	Guram Ghaniashvili	(substituted on) 67'
FL	20	Tornike Jalaghonia	(substituted on) 63'
SH	21	Gela Aprasidze	(substituted on) 67'
FB	22	Luka Tsirekidze	(substituted on) 71'
CE	23	Giorgi Kveseladze	(substituted on) 54'
Coach:
(England) Richard Cockerill

FB	15	Alberto Carmona		(substituted off) 53'
RW	14	Martiniano Cian
OC	13	Iñaki Mateu
IC	12	Gonzalo López-Bontempo
LW	11	Gauthier Minguillon
FH	10	Gonzalo Vinuesa		(substituted off) 53'
SH	9	Estanislao Bay	(yellow card) 33'	(substituted off) 67'
N8	8	Raphaël Nieto
OF	7	Ekain Imaz		(substituted off) 57'
BF	6	Mario Pichardie		(substituted off) 54'
RL	5	Manex Ariceta
LL	4	Matthew Foulds
TP	3	Joaquín Domínguez		(substituted off) 44'
HK	2	Álvaro García (c)		(substituted off) 72'
LP	1	Thierry Futeu		(substituted off) 47'
Substitutions:
HK	16	Pablo Miejimolle		(substituted on) 72'
PR	17	Hugo Pirlet		(substituted on) 47'
PR	18	Lucas Santamaria		(substituted on) 44'
LK	19	Ignacio Pineiro		(substituted on) 54'
FL	20	Vicente Boronat		(substituted on) 56'
SH	21	Facundo Munilla		(substituted on) 67'
CE	22	Álvar Gimeno		(substituted on) 53'
FH	23	Luciano Richardis		(substituted on) 53'
Coach:
(Argentina) Pablo Bouza

Assistant referees:
Alberto Favaro (Italy)
Dario Merli (Italy)
Television match official:
Stefano Penne (Italy)

== Final standings ==
Pos.	Team	Points	2027 RWC / WRNC Division 2 qualification
1	Georgia	10	Qualified as Europe 1
2	Spain	8	Qualified as Europe 2
3	Romania	6	Qualified as Europe 3
4	Portugal	5	Qualified as Europe 4
5	Belgium	4	Advances to FQT
6	Netherlands	3	Eliminated
7	Switzerland	2	Eliminated
8	Germany	1	Eliminated

== Team of the Tournament ==
On 21 March 2025 Rugby Europe published its Team of the Tournament

Pos.		Player	Club / Province	Competition
LP	1	(Georgia (country)) Nika Abuladze	(France) Montpellier	(France) Top 14
HK	2	(Georgia (country)) Vano Karkadze	(France) Montpellier	(France) Top 14
TP	3	(Portugal) Diogo Hasse Ferreira	(France) Dax	(France) Pro D2
LL	4	(Netherlands) Koen Bloemen	(France) Bourg-en-Bresse	(France) Championnat Fédéral Nationale
RL	5	(Romania) Andrei Mahu	(France) Massy	(France) Championnat Fédéral Nationale
BF	6	(Belgium) Jean-Maurice Decubber	(France) Massy	(France) Championnat Fédéral Nationale
OF	7	(Portugal) Lucas Martins	(France) Agen	(France) Pro D2
N8	8	(Spain) Raphaël Nieto	(France) Stade Niortais	(France) Championnat Fédéral Nationale 2
SH	9	(Georgia (country)) Vasil Lobzhanidze	(France) Oyonnax	(France) Pro D2
FH	10	(Georgia (country)) Davit Niniashvili	(France) Lyon	(France) Top 14
LW	11	(Spain) Gonzalo López-Bontempo	(France) Massy	(France) Championnat Fédéral Nationale
IC	12	(Spain) Martiniano Cian Garcia	(Spain) VRAC Quesos Entrepinares	(Spain) División de Honor de Rugby
OC	13	(Switzerland) Jeremy To'a	(France) US Carcassonne	(France) Championnat Fédéral Nationale
RW	14	(Georgia (country)) Aka Tabutsadze	(Georgia (country)) Black Lion	(Europe) Super Cup / (Europe) EPCR Challenge Cup
FB	15	(Romania) Marius Simionescu	(Romania) Timișoara	(Romania) Liga de Rugby Kaufland

== International broadcasters ==
Country	Broadcaster	Summary
Belgium	VRT; LN24	Belgium games shown live via VRT and LN24.
Georgia	Rugby TV; Imedi TV	Georgia games shown live via Rugby TV and Imedi TV. Also Georgia games are streamed and free on Rugby TV Facebook page.
Germany	ProSieben Maxx; Joyn; Ran	Germany games shown live via ProSieben Maxx, other games are streamed and free on Joyn and Ran.
Netherlands	Ziggo	Selected games live on Ziggo Sport.
Portugal	Sport TV	Portugal games shown live on Sport TV.
Romania	TVR1; TVR Sport	Romania games shown live via TVR1 and TVR Sport.
Spain	Teledeporte; RTVE Play	Spain games shown live via Teledeporte and .RTVE Play digital platform.
Switzerland	RTS 2 SRI digital	Switzerland games shown live via RTS 2 channel and SRI digital platforms.
North America	FloRugby	All games available through streaming via FloSports.
Rest of the World	Rugby Europe	All games available through streaming via Rugby Europe (registration required). Some games are streamed and free on Rugby Europe YouTube channel

== See also ==
- Rugby Europe International Championships
- Antim Cup
