= World Rugby Rankings =

Ranking system for national teams in rugby union

Men's World Rugby Rankings Top 30 as of 9 November 2026
Rank	Change (Note: Change from the previous week)	Team	Points
1	Steady	South Africa	93.09
2	Steady	New Zealand	92.65
3	Steady	Ireland	88.70
4	Steady	France	87.49
5	Steady	England	86.99
6	Steady	Scotland	84.40
7	Steady	Australia	83.12
8	Steady	Argentina	81.62
9	Steady	Fiji	77.79
10	Steady	Wales	77.37
11	Steady	Italy	76.30
12	Steady	Japan	75.25
13	Steady	Georgia	73.94
14	Steady	Portugal	70.52
15	Steady	United States	67.80
16	▲1	Spain	67.73
17	▲2	Tonga	65.87
18	▼2	Chile	65.81
19	▲1	Samoa	65.31
20	▼2	Uruguay	64.86
21	▲1	Canada	62.29
22	▲1	Belgium	62.00
23	▼2	Romania	61.72
24	Steady	Hong Kong	59.55
25	Steady	Zimbabwe	58.02
26	Steady	Netherlands	56.44
27	Steady	Namibia	56.03
28	Steady	Switzerland	55.47
29	Steady	Czech Republic	55.42
30	Steady	Poland	54.54

Source: World Rugby
Graph updated to 2 November 2026

The World Rugby Rankings is a ranking system for national teams in rugby union, managed by World Rugby, the sport's governing body. The teams of World Rugby's member nations are ranked based on their game results, with the most successful teams being ranked highest. A point system is used, with points being awarded on the basis of the results of World Rugby-recognized international matches. Rankings are based on the team's performance, with more recent results and more significant matches being more heavily weighted to help reflect the current competitive state of a team. The men's ranking system was introduced the month before the 2003 Rugby World Cup, with the first new rankings issued on 6 October 2003, when they were called the "IRB Rankings".

== Rankings ==
=== Rank leaders ===
World Rugby Ranking leaders

When the system was introduced England were the top team and maintained that position following victory in the 2003 Rugby World Cup. New Zealand took the lead from 14 June 2004.

After winning the 2007 Rugby World Cup final, South Africa became the third team to achieve first place. The first two fixtures of the 2008 Tri Nations resulted in the top two teams switching places: the All Blacks regained the top spot after defeating South Africa in the Tri-Nations opener on 5 July 2008 in Wellington; a week later the Springboks returned the favour in Dunedin, scoring their first win over the All Blacks in New Zealand since 1998, reclaiming the top spot, only for the All Blacks to defeat both Australia and South Africa in August 2008 to regain the top spot by a considerable margin. South Africa regained the lead in July 2009 after beating New Zealand in Bloemfontein and kept the lead until losing to France in November of that year, allowing the All Blacks to regain the top spot.

A change at the top would not occur for a record period of 508 weeks (from 16 November 2009 to 19 August 2019), when Wales became the top ranked team for the first time after defeating England at Cardiff in a World Cup 2019 warm-up test in August, following on a streak in which they won 15 of 16 tests, including a Six Nations Grand Slam. Two weeks later New Zealand returned to the top of the summit following Ireland's victory over Wales in Cardiff in a World Cup 2019 warm-up test. However, on 7 September 2019, Ireland defeated Wales again, this time in Dublin, and they were installed as the number 1 team for the first time in their history, which they held entering the 2019 Rugby World Cup.

The first round of matches in the 2019 Rugby World Cup saw a further change at the top, with New Zealand's pool stage victory over the Springboks seeing them regain the top spot. England's defeat of New Zealand in the 2019 World Cup semi-finals saw them return to the top spot for the first time since 2004. A week later, South Africa reclaimed top spot after defeating England in the final.

2021 saw the ranking lead change several times with South Africa and New Zealand each holding the top spot at various points. In 2022, France replaced South Africa on top of the rankings following their victory over Japan in their summer tour and the Springboks' home defeat by a touring Wales team. A week later, Ireland claimed top spot following victory in their summer tour to New Zealand.

Ireland held the top spot until October 2023, when they lost to New Zealand in the quarter-final stage of the 2023 Rugby World Cup – with South Africa replacing them. However, following their away defeat to Argentina in the 2024 Rugby Championship, South Africa relinquished the top spot to Ireland.

The Springboks regained the no. 1 position after Ireland's home defeat to New Zealand during the 2024 Autumn Nations Series.

Since the rankings began, the winners of every edition of the World Cup have held the number 1 spot at the end of the tournament.

New Zealand have been the most consistently ranked #1 team since the introduction of the world rankings in 2003, having held the #1 ranking for most of the time during this period. South Africa is second, with Ireland, England, Wales and France making up the remainder.

To date, 2019 is the only calendar year in which more than three nations have held the number 1 spot – with five nations holding that title at some point during the year.

==== Best and worst ranking positions ====
Below is a list of the best and worst ranking positions for nations that have appeared in the Rugby World Cup:

Team	Best		Worst	
Team	Rank	Year(s)	Rank	Year(s)
Argentina	3	2007–08	12	2014
Australia	2	2003, 2004–05, 2007, 2008, 2010, 2011–12, 2015–16	10	2023, 2024
Canada	11	2011	25	2025, 2025–26
Chile	16	2026	30	2016–17, 2019
England	1	2003, 2003–04, 2019	8	2009, 2015–16, 2023
Fiji	7	2023	16	2011, 2012
France	1	2022	10	2018, 2019
Georgia	11	2016, 2019, 2023, 2025	23	2004
Hong Kong	21	2018, 2019, 2020, 2021, 2022	39	2009, 2010
Ireland	1	2019, 2022, 2022–23, 2024	9	2013
Italy	8	2007, 2024	15	2015, 2017, 2018, 2018–19, 2021
Ivory Coast	38	2003, 2005, 2006, 2021	69	2026
Japan	7	2019	20	2003, 2006
Namibia	18	2017	29	2006
New Zealand	1	2003, 2004–07, 2008, 2009, 2009–19, 2019, 2021, 2025, 2026	5	2022
Portugal	13	2023, 2023–24	30	2015, 2016
Romania	13	2003, 2004, 2005, 2006	23	2026
Russia	16	2007, 2008, 2009, 2012	34	2025
Samoa	7	2013	20	2026
Scotland	5	2017, 2017–18, 2018, 2023, 2026	12	2012, 2013, 2015
Spain	14	2025	32	2004–05
South Africa	1	2007–08, 2008, 2009, 2019–21, 2021–22, 2023–24, 2024–25, 2025–26, 2026	7	2017, 2018
Tonga	9	2011	20	2005, 2006, 2026
United States	12	2018, 2018–19	20	2008, 2022
Uruguay	14	2005, 2025, 2025–26	23	2012, 2017
Wales	1	2019	14	2025
Zimbabwe	24	2025, 2025–26	57	2007, 2008

==== Rating leaders ====
According to World Rugby the "top side in the World will normally have a rating above 90",. New Zealand retained the number 1 position in August 2019 following defeat by Australia at Perth in the Rugby Championship, despite their ratings falling to 89.04. A week later, Wales increased their rating to 89.43 and claimed the top spot by beating England at Cardiff in a World Cup 2019 warm-up test. In contrast, some countries that have reached a rating of over 90 rating points, such as Australia (91.75) and Ireland (91.17), did not achieve the top spot, although Ireland would eventually reach the top of the summit with a rating of 89.47 following their victory over Wales in a World Cup 2019 warm-up test in Dublin, while Australia still to date have never attained the number 1 ranked position. This is due to the success of New Zealand who had been rated above 90 rating points for a record of 509 weeks and 6 days (from 2 November 2009 to 11 August 2019), which ended following the aforementioned defeat to Australia.

New Zealand also holds the record for the highest rating points amassed by any team, which currently stands at 96.57. England first held the record at 93.99 on the 24 November 2003, following their World Cup win in Australia; however, New Zealand surpassed this on 28 August 2006 with a rating of 94.62, following their Tri Nations victory over South Africa in Pretoria. The All Blacks would go on to push this record further over the years, reaching 95.01 points on the 25 June 2007 after beating South Africa in Durban, 96.10 points after their 2015 World Cup win in England and 96.30 points on 22 August 2016, following their Rugby Championship victory over Australia in Sydney, to its current record of 96.57, which they attained on 10 October 2016 after defeating South Africa in Durban. New Zealand's defeat by Ireland at Soldier Field, Chicago as part of the Autumn International Test Series in November 2016 ended their record streak.

==== Most and least accumulated ratings ====
Below is a list of the most and least accumulated rating points for each of the nations that have appeared in the Rugby World Cup since the ranking tables were first published on the 6 October 2003:

Team	Most		Least	
Team	Rating points	Date achieved	Rating points	Date achieved
Argentina	87.45	22 October 2007	73.98	23 June 2014
Australia	91.75	26 October 2015	76.50	25 September 2023
Canada	73.74	19 September 2011	57.75	21 July 2025
Chile	67.59	13 July 2026	53.65	6 February 2017
England	93.99	24 November 2003	77.79	17 September 2007
Fiji	81.16	2 October 2023	68.78	26 September 2011
France	90.59	11 September 2023	77.03	4 February 2019
Georgia	76.23	20 March 2023	59.82	8 November 2004
Hong Kong	61.72	11 July 2022	50.42	21 December 2009
Ireland	93.79	25 September 2023	77.25	16 June 2008
Italy	81.09	9 March 2026	69.98	13 October 2003
Ivory Coast	50.47	15 June 2009	39.06	21 July 2025
Japan	82.09	14 October 2019	61.42	3 November 2003
Namibia	62.98	18 July 2016	54.71	11 September 2006
New Zealand	96.57	10 October 2016	85.78	29 August 2022
Portugal	72.78	9 October 2023	54.25	21 March 2016
Romania	70.71	20 November 2017	59.68	9 February 2026
Russia	67.63	15 February 2010	52.06	6 January 2025
Samoa	80.50	17 June 2013	64.73	20 July 2026
Scotland	85.28	16 November 2026	72.91	14 November 2005
South Africa	95.09	14 September 2026	80.63	20 October 2003
Spain	69.34	3 February 2020	53.43	29 March 2004
Tonga	76.80	27 May 2013	62.04	25 July 2005
United States	73.62	19 November 2018	63.11	23 June 2008
Uruguay	69.19	24 November 2025	59.37	12 November 2012
Wales	89.97	18 March 2019	72.65	7 July 2025
Zimbabwe	58.80	21 July 2025	44.45	9 July 2007

== List of rankings leader ==
Six national teams have led the world rankings, of which two had a single short stay at that position - Wales for two weeks in 2019, and France for one week in 2022. Either New Zealand or South Africa have led for over 90% of the time, with New Zealand having held no. 1 position for over 60% of the time.

New Zealand have spent over 14 years in the top spot, including a dominant nearly ten-year consecutive stretch from November 2009 to September 2019, highlighted by consecutive World Cup titles in 2011 and 2015 and seven Tri Nations/Rugby Championships. Both of these records (most weeks and most consecutive weeks) at no. 1 are unparalleled, but since relinquishing the top spot to Ireland in September 2019, they have only led for 14 weeks. New Zealand have led the rankings on 11 separate occasions, most recently in August 2026.

South Africa have topped the rankings on ten separate occasions for over six years collectively. They have led the rankings for the over 75% of the time since end of 2019, highlighted by consecutive World Cup titles in 2019 and 2023 and three Tri Nations/Rugby Championships. During this time, their closest challenger has been Ireland, who have led for over 70 weeks in 3 batches, mainly a 65-week consecutive stretch from 2022–2023 and highlighted by a 2022 Tour victory over New Zealand, plus a Grand Slam at the 2023 Six Nations Championship.

England have led for a total of 36 weeks across three stretches; two across 35 of the first 36 weeks of the rankings beginning just prior to their 2003 World Cup victory, followed by a record fifteen-year gap between reigns - the latter a 1-week stint between their semi-final win over New Zealand and final loss to South Africa at the 2019 World Cup.

New Zealand (twice, June 2004 to October 2007 and November 2009 to August 2019), South Africa (November 2019 to September 2021) and Ireland (July 2022 to October 2023) are the only sides to spend at least one-consecutive-year (effectively an entire season) on top of the men's world rankings.

Team	Start date	End date	Weeks	Total weeks
England	6 October 2003	10 November 2003	5	5
New Zealand	10 November 2003	17 November 2003	1	1
England (2)	17 November 2003	14 June 2004	30	35
New Zealand (2)	14 June 2004	22 October 2007	175	176
South Africa	22 October 2007	7 July 2008	37	37
New Zealand (3)	7 July 2008	14 July 2008	1	177
South Africa (2)	14 July 2008	18 August 2008	5	42
New Zealand (4)	18 August 2008	27 July 2009	49	226
South Africa (3)	27 July 2009	16 November 2009	16	58
New Zealand (5)	16 November 2009	19 August 2019	509	735
Wales	19 August 2019	2 September 2019	2	2
New Zealand (6)	2 September 2019	9 September 2019	1	736
Ireland	9 September 2019	23 September 2019	2	2
New Zealand (7)	23 September 2019	28 October 2019	5	741
England (3)	28 October 2019	4 November 2019	1	36
South Africa (4)	4 November 2019	20 September 2021	98	156
New Zealand (8)	20 September 2021	4 October 2021	2	743
South Africa (5)	4 October 2021	1 November 2021	4	160
New Zealand (9)	1 November 2021	15 November 2021	2	745
South Africa (6)	15 November 2021	11 July 2022	34	194
France	11 July 2022	18 July 2022	1	1
Ireland (2)	18 July 2022	16 October 2023	65	67
South Africa (7)	16 October 2023	23 September 2024	49	243
Ireland (3)	23 September 2024	11 November 2024	7	74
South Africa (8)	11 November 2024	18 August 2025	40	283
New Zealand (10)	18 August 2025	15 September 2025	4	749
South Africa (9)	15 September 2025	24 August 2026	49	332
New Zealand (11)	24 August 2026	31 August 2026	1	750
South Africa (10)	31 August 2026	Ongoing	12	344

Summary

Team	Total weeks	Most consecutive weeks	Separate reigns
New Zealand	750	509	11
South Africa	344	98	10
Ireland	74	65	3
England	36	30	3
Wales	2	2	1
France	1	1	1

=== Current calculation method ===
All World Rugby member countries have been given a rating that is in the range of 0 to 100 with the top side achieving a rating of about 90 points. The point system is calculated using a 'Points Exchange' system, in which sides receive points from each other on the basis of the match result – whatever one side gains, the other loses. The exchanges are based on the match result, the ranking of each team, and the margin of victory, and previously provided a handicap for home advantage. As the system aims to depict current team strengths, past successes or losses will fade and be superseded by more recent results. Thus, it is thought that it will produce an accurate picture depicting the actual current strength and thus rank of the nations. The rankings are responsive to results and it is possible to climb from the bottom to the top (and vice versa) in fewer than 20 matches. As all matches are worth a net of 0 points for the two teams combined, there is no particular advantage to playing more matches. A rating stays the same until the team plays again. Although matches often result in points exchanges, 'predictable' results lead to very minor changes, and may result in no change to either side's rating.

==== Rules ====
The system ensures that it is representative of the teams' performance despite playing differing numbers of matches each year, and the differing strength of opposition that teams have to face. The factors taken into account are as follows:

- Match result
- Match status
- Opposition strength

(Prior to July 1, 2026: Home advantage)

===== Match result =====
For each match played, points exchanges are awarded for the following five outcomes, and was developed using results of international matches from 1871 to the present day:

- a win or loss by more than 15 points
- a win or loss by up to 15 points
- a draw

===== Match status =====
Different matches have different importance to teams, and World Rugby has tried to reflect this by using a weighting system, where the most significant matches are in the Rugby World Cup Finals. Points exchanges are doubled during the World Cup Finals to recognise the unique importance of this event. All other full international matches are treated the same, to be as fair as possible to countries playing a different mix of friendly and competitive matches. Matches that do not have full international status do not count.

===== Opposition strength =====
A win against a very highly ranked opponent is a considerably greater achievement than a win against a low-rated opponent, so the strength of the opposing team is a factor. Thus match results are more important than margins of victory in producing accurate rankings. This is because when a highly ranked team plays a lowly ranked team and manages to beat them by over 50 points, it does not necessarily indicate how either team will perform in the future.

===== How to calculate the Points Exchange =====
[1] Take the pre-match Points Ranking Score of Team Y. Call it “A”.

[2] Take the pre-match Points Ranking Score of Team Z. Call it “B”.

[3] Calculate the difference between the two “pre-match Points Ranking Scores”. Call it “D”.

[4] Apply the formula from the relevant item in this list:

World Cup matches

... Team Y wins by 16 or more points ............... (10+B-A) x 0.3 capped at 6

... Team Y wins by 15 or fewer points ............... (10+B-A) x 0.2 capped at 4

... The match is a draw [**see note 9] ............... D x 0.2 capped at 2

... Team Z wins by 15 or fewer points ............... (10+A-B) x 0.2 capped at 4

... Team Z wins by 16 or more points ............... (10+A-B) x 0.3 capped at 6

Other international

... Team Y wins by 16 or more points ............... (10+B-A) x 0.15 capped at 3

... Team Y wins by 15 or fewer points ............... (10+B-A) x 0.1 capped at 2

... The match is a draw [**see note 9] ............... D x 0.1 capped at 1

... Team Z wins by 15 or fewer points ............... (10+A-B) x 0.1 capped at 2

... Team Z wins by 16 or more points ............... (10+A-B) x 0.15 capped at 3

[5] The team with the higher “pre-match Points Ranking Score” may be termed the “Favourite”.

[6] The team with the lower “pre-match Points Ranking Score” may be termed the “Underdog”.

[7] A team whose “pre-match Points Ranking Score” is 10+ points lower than their opponents’ "pre-match Points Ranking Score” may be termed the “Outsider”.

[8] An "Underdog" stands to gain more from a victory than does a "Favourite".

[9] In the case of a draw, the points are transferred from the “Favourite” to the “Underdog” or “Outsider”. The transfer is capped at 1 (2 in a World Cup match).

[10] There is no transfer of points if a “Favourite” beats an “Outsider”.

===== New and dormant nations =====
All new member nations start with 30.00 points, which is provisional until they have completed ten test matches. When countries merge, the new country inherits the higher rating of the two countries but when they split e.g., the 2010 breakup of the Arabian Gulf rugby union team into separate teams representing its current member countries, the new countries will inherit a rating at a fixed level below the rating of the original country.

Before 1 December 2012, new member nations were given 40.00 points.

Countries that have not played a test for a number of years are removed from the ranking system and the list. If they become active again, they resume their previous rating.

***For a full explanation of how rankings are calculated, see the World Rugby rankings website.

== See also ==
- World Rugby Women's World Rankings
- International rugby union team records
