= Lovejoy (surname) =

Lovejoy is an English surname. Notable people with the surname include:

- Allen P. Lovejoy (1825–1904), American politician
- Arthur Oncken Lovejoy (1873–1962), American philosopher and intellectual historian
- Asa Lovejoy (1808–1882), American pioneer and politician, founder of Portland, Oregon
- Ben Lovejoy (born 1984), American ice hockey player
- Chad Lovejoy (born 1973), American politician
- Curtis Lovejoy (1957–2021), American swimmer, Paralympic gold medalist
- Deirdre Lovejoy (born 1962), American actress
- Elijah Parish Lovejoy (1802–1837), American journalist and abolitionist
- Esther Pohl Lovejoy (1869–1967), American physician and activist
- F. T. F. Lovejoy (1854–1932), American industrialist
- Frank Lovejoy (1912–1962), American actor
- George Lovejoy (1923–2003), Australian rugby league commentator
- George A. Lovejoy (New Hampshire politician) (1931–2015), American politician and businessman
- George A. Lovejoy (Washington politician) (1879–1944), American politician
- Ian Lovejoy (born 1982), American politician
- Joseph Cammett Lovejoy (1805–1871), American clergyman, activist, author
- Julia Louisa Lovejoy (1812-1882), American abolitionist writer
- Lynda Lovejoy (born 1949), Navajo politician
- Margot Lovejoy (1930–2019), Canadian-American digital artist and historian of art & technology
- Owen Lovejoy (1811–1864), American congressman and abolitionist
- Owen Lovejoy (anthropologist) (born 1943), American evolutionary biologist
- Paul Lovejoy (born 1943), Canadian historian
- Pauli Lovejoy (born 1988), British drummer, recording artist, music director
- Patricia Lovejoy, American politician
- Ray Lovejoy (1939–2001), British film editor
- Rob Lovejoy (born 1991), American retired soccer player
- Robin Lovejoy (1924–1985), Australian theatre director and actor
- Spencer Lovejoy (born 1998), American professional squash player
- Terry Lovejoy (born 1966), Australian amateur astronomer and information technologist
- Thomas Lovejoy (1941–2021), American ecologist
- Tim Lovejoy (born 1968), English television presenter
- William Lovejoy (1849–1913), Australian politician, member of the Queensland Legislative Assembly

Fictional characters:

- Reverend Timothy Lovejoy, a recurring character in the animated television series The Simpsons
- Helen Lovejoy, wife of the above
- Lovejoy, a fictional antiques dealer of eponymous novels and television
