= George A. Lovejoy =

George A. Lovejoy may refer to:

- George A. Lovejoy (New Hampshire politician) (1931–2015)
- George A. Lovejoy (Washington politician) (1879–1944)

== See also ==
- George Lovejoy (1923–2003), Australian radio sports commentator
