= Senator Lovejoy =

Senator Lovejoy may refer to:

- Allen P. Lovejoy (1825–1904), Wisconsin State Senate
- George A. Lovejoy (New Hampshire politician) (1931–2015), New Hampshire State Senate
- George A. Lovejoy (Washington politician) (1879–1944), Washington State Senate
- Lynda Lovejoy (born 1949), New Mexico State Senate
