= History of rugby union matches between Australia and the British & Irish Lions =

Australia (the Wallabies) first played against the British & Irish Lions in 1899, winning 13–3 at the Sydney Cricket Ground, Sydney. There have been 26 Test matches between the two teams, with the Wallabies winning 7 of them and the British & Irish Lions 19. The last test of the most recent series was held at ANZ Stadium, Sydney, on 2 August 2025 and finished in a 22-12 win for the Wallabies.

== Summary ==
Details	Played	Won by Australia	Won by British & Irish Lions	Drawn	Australia points	British & Irish Lions points
Overall	26	7	19	0	293	470

=== Records ===
Note: Date shown in brackets indicates when the record was or last set.

Record	Australia	Lions
Longest winning streak	2 (6 August 1950 – 4 June 1966)	6 (18 January 1958 – 17 January 1976)
Largest points for
Home	35 (7 July 2001)	—N/a
Away	—N/a	41 (6 July 2013)
Largest winning margin
Home	21 (7 July 2001)	—N/a
Away	—N/a	31 (4 June 1966)

=== Attendance ===
Up to date as of 26 July 2025.

Total attendance
919,156
Average attendance
36,766
Highest attendance
90,307
Australia 26–29 Lions
26 July 2025

== Results ==
No.	Date	Venue	Score	Winner	Attendance	Series	Ref.
1	24 June 1899	Sydney Cricket Ground, Sydney, Colony of New South Wales	13–3	Australia	28,000	1899 British Isles tour of Australia	
2	22 July 1899	Exhibition Ground, Brisbane, Colony of Queensland	0–11	British Isles	15,000	1899 British Isles tour of Australia	
3	5 August 1899	Sydney Cricket Ground, Sydney, Colony of New South Wales	10–11	British Isles	16,000	1899 British Isles tour of Australia	
4	12 August 1899	Sydney Cricket Ground, Sydney, Colony of New South Wales	0–13	British Isles	7,000	1899 British Isles tour of Australia	
5	2 July 1904	Sydney Cricket Ground, Sydney, New South Wales	0–17	British Isles	34,000	1904 British Isles tour of Australia and New Zealand	
6	23 July 1904	Exhibition Ground, Brisbane, Queensland	3–17	British Isles	15,000	1904 British Isles tour of Australia and New Zealand	
7	30 July 1904	Sydney Cricket Ground, Sydney, New South Wales	0–16	British Isles	24,000	1904 British Isles tour of Australia and New Zealand	
8	30 August 1930	Sydney Cricket Ground, Sydney, New South Wales	6–5	Australia	30,712	1930 British Isles tour of New Zealand and Australia	
9	19 August 1950	Sydney Cricket Ground, Sydney, New South Wales	6–19	British Lions	20,000	1950 British Lions tour of New Zealand and Australia	
10	26 August 1950	Exhibition Ground, Brisbane, Queensland	3–24	British Lions	20,000	1950 British Lions tour of New Zealand and Australia	
11	6 June 1959	Exhibition Ground, Brisbane, Queensland	6–17	British Lions	20,000	1959 British Lions tour to Australia and New Zealand	
12	13 June 1959	Sydney Sports Ground, Sydney, New South Wales	3–24	British Lions	15,521	1959 British Lions tour to Australia and New Zealand	
13	28 May 1966	Sydney Cricket Ground, Sydney, New South Wales	8–11	British Lions	42,303	1966 British Lions tour of Australia and New Zealand	
14	4 June 1966	Lang Park, Brisbane, Queensland	0–31	British Lions	18,500	1966 British Lions tour of Australia and New Zealand	
15	1 July 1989	Sydney Football Stadium, Sydney, New South Wales	30–12	Australia	39,433	1989 British Lions tour of Australia	
16	8 July 1989	Ballymore Stadium, Brisbane, Queensland	12–19	British Lions	20,525	1989 British Lions tour of Australia	
17	15 July 1989	Sydney Football Stadium, Sydney, New South Wales	18–19	British Lions	39,401	1989 British Lions tour of Australia	
18	30 June 2001	The Gabba, Brisbane, Queensland	13–29	British & Irish Lions	37,460	2001 British & Irish Lions tour of Australia	
19	7 July 2001	Docklands Stadium, Melbourne, Victoria	35–14	Australia	56,605	2001 British & Irish Lions tour of Australia	
20	14 July 2001	Stadium Australia, Sydney, New South Wales	29–23	Australia	84,188	2001 British & Irish Lions tour of Australia	
21	22 June 2013	Lang Park, Brisbane, Queensland	21–23	British & Irish Lions	52,499	2013 British & Irish Lions tour of Australia	
22	29 June 2013	Docklands Stadium, Melbourne, Victoria	16–15	Australia	56,771	2013 British & Irish Lions tour of Australia	
23	6 July 2013	Stadium Australia, Sydney, New South Wales	16–41	British & Irish Lions	83,702	2013 British & Irish Lions tour of Australia	
24	19 July 2025	Lang Park, Brisbane, Queensland	19–27	British & Irish Lions	52,229	2025 British & Irish Lions tour of Australia	
25	26 July 2025	Melbourne Cricket Ground, Melbourne, Victoria	26–29	British & Irish Lions	90,307	2025 British & Irish Lions tour of Australia	
26	2 August 2025	Stadium Australia, Sydney, New South Wales	22–12	Australia	80,312	2025 British & Irish Lions tour of Australia	

== List of series ==
Played	Won by Australia	Won by British & Irish Lions	Drawn
10	2	8	0

Series	Australia wins	Lions wins	Victor
1899	1	3	British Isles
1904	0	3	British Isles
1930	1	0	Australia
1950	0	2	British Lions
1959	0	2	British Lions
1966	0	2	British Lions
1989	1	2	British Lions
2001	2	1	Australia
2013	1	2	British & Irish Lions
2025	1	2	British & Irish Lions

== See also ==
- Tom Richards Cup (2001–2013)
- 1888 British Lions tour to New Zealand and Australia
