= Tom Richards Cup =

International rugby union trophy

- Sport: Rugby union
- Instituted: 2001; 25 years ago
- Number of teams: 2
- Country: Australia; British and Irish Lions
- Holders: British and Irish Lions (2013)
- Most titles: Australia; British and Irish Lions (1 title)

Tom Richards played for both Australia and the British Lions.

The Tom Richards Cup, also known as the Tom Richards Trophy, was an international rugby union trophy awarded to the winner of British & Irish Lions–Australia test series.

== Tom Richards ==
Tom Richards is the only Australian-born player to have represented both the Wallabies and Lions. However, Blair Swannell, born in England, also represented the Lions (1899 & 1904) and Australia (1905). Richards took part in the Gallipoli campaign and for his efforts in France was awarded the Military Cross. In 1908 Richards played in the first Wallaby team to tour Britain and won the gold medal at the 1908 Olympic Games. In 1910 he represented the Lions as a replacement on their tour to South Africa while living in the country. In 1912 he was selected for the Wallaby tour to the United States and Canada.

== History ==
The Tom Richards Cup was commissioned for the 2001 British & Irish Lions tour series and the inaugural winner was Australia, who won the series 2–1.

This was the first time that Australia had managed to defeat the Lions in a series. Twelve years later, the Lions won the 2013 tour to Australia 2–1, making them the last holders of the trophy.

The two teams' first meeting was in Australia in 1899 where they played a four-test series, won by the Lions 3–1.

Ahead of the British & Irish Lions' tour of Australia in 2025, it was reported by The Sydney Morning Herald that the Tom Richards Cup was retired. A new trophy established for the Lions' test series against South Africa, the Lions Series Trophy, would be its replacement, and would be contested between the Lions and all their traditional touring opponents (Australia, New Zealand, South Africa).

== Results ==
| Date and time | | Venue | Home | Score | Away | Trophy winner |
2013
| 6 July | 20:00 AEST (UTC+10) | Stadium Australia, Sydney | Australia | 16–41 | British & Irish Lions | |
| 29 June | 20:05 AEST (UTC+10) | Docklands Stadium, Melbourne | Australia | 16–15 | British & Irish Lions | |
| 7 June | 20:05 AEST (UTC+10) | Lang Park, Brisbane | Australia | 21–23 | British & Irish Lions | |
2001
| 14 July | 19:00 AEST (UTC+10) | Stadium Australia, Sydney | Australia | 29–23 | British & Irish Lions | |
| 7 July | 19:00 AEST (UTC+10) | Docklands Stadium, Melbourne | Australia | 35–14 | British & Irish Lions | |
| 30 June | 19:00 AEST (UTC+10) | Brisbane Cricket Ground, Brisbane | Australia | 13–29 | British & Irish Lions | |

== Tom Richards Medal ==
Although the Tom Richards Cup would no longer be up for grabs for future Lions tours of Australia, a new medal in his honour was announced for the "Player of the Series" for the 2025 British & Irish Lions tour of Australia. Lions forward Tadhg Beirne was the first recipient of the medal, named Player of the Series following the Lions' 2–1 series win over Australia.

== See also ==
- History of rugby union matches between Australia and the British & Irish Lions
