= Frank Puletua =

Samoa international rugby league footballer

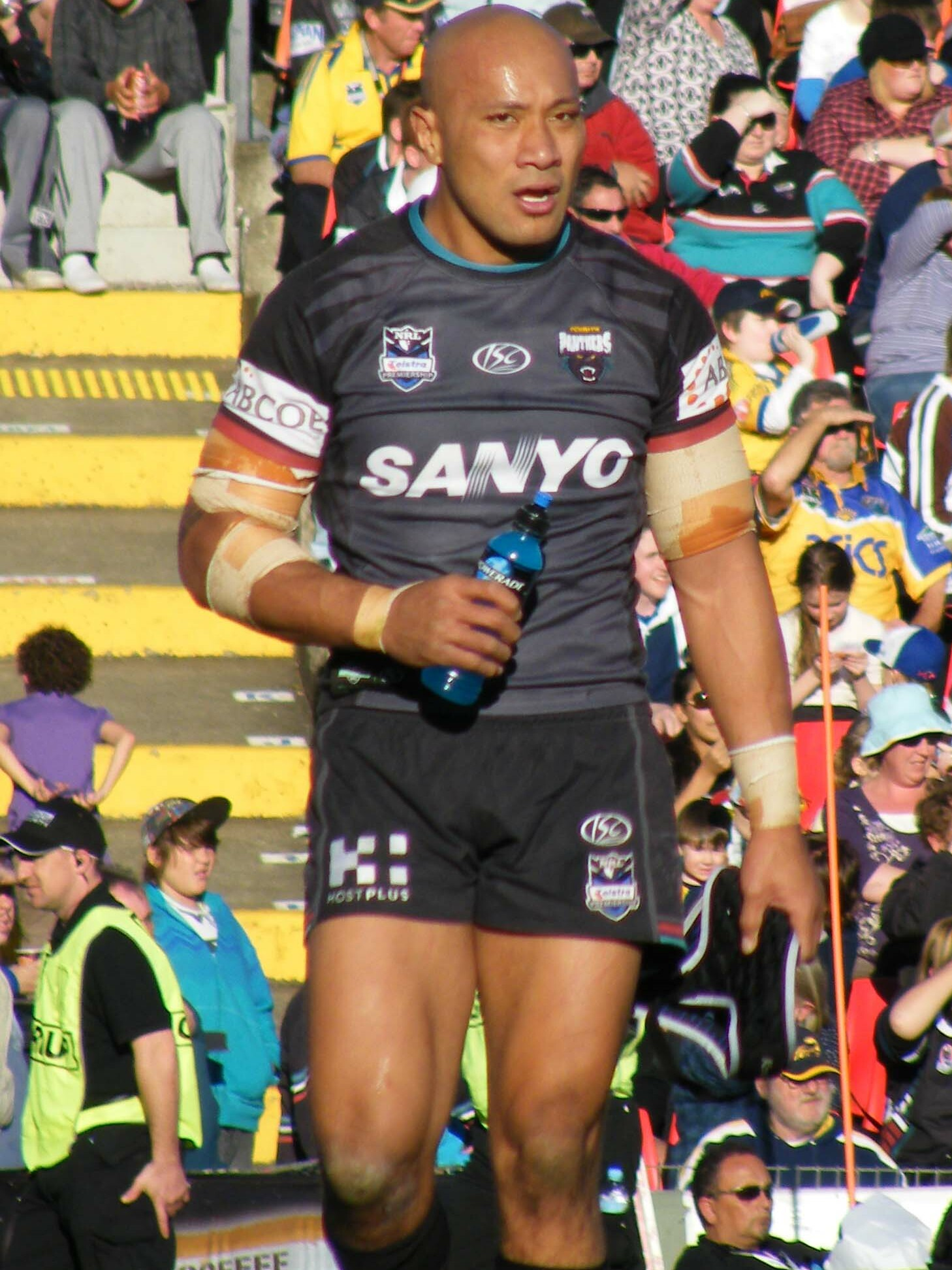

Personal information
- Born: 8 May 1978 (age 48) Auckland, New Zealand

Playing information
- Height: 186 cm (6 ft 1 in)
- Weight: 102 kg (16 st 1 lb)
- Position: Prop, Second-row
Club
Years	Team	Pld	T	G	FG	P
1998–01	Penrith Panthers	31	1	0	0	4
2002–03	South Sydney	26	0	0	0	0
2004–11	Penrith Panthers	121	3	0	0	12
	Total	178	4	0	0	16
Representative
Years	Team	Pld	T	G	FG	P
2000–08	Samoa	7	1	0	0	4
- Relatives: Tony Puletua (brother)

Frank Puletua (born 8 May 1978) is a former Samoa international rugby league footballer who played in the 1990s, 2000s and 2010s. A second-row, he played his club football in the National Rugby League for Australian clubs the Penrith Panthers and the South Sydney Rabbitohs.

== Background ==
Puletua played his junior rugby league for the St Mary's Saints before being signed by the Penrith Panthers.

His brother is New Zealand and Samoan international Tony Puletua. He holds fine arts and graphics design degrees from the University of Western Sydney

== Playing career ==
Puletua made his NRL debut for the Penrith Panthers on 25 April 1998 against the Melbourne Storm. Eligible to represent Samoa, Puletua did so in the 2000 World Cup. Puletua played for the Penrith club until switching to the South Sydney Rabbitohs for the 2002 season. In his final year in the first spell at Penrith, Puletua played 19 games as the club finished with the Wooden Spoon. Puletua played nine games for South Sydney in their first year back after being readmitted to the competition. The following year, he played 17 games for Souths in the 2003 NRL season as the club finished with the Wooden Spoon. Puletua then re-joined Penrith in 2004.

After three further seasons at Penrith, Puletua then signed with the new Gold Coast Titans in 2007 but changed his mind and left the club, returning to Penrith. Penrith would go on to finish with the Wooden Spoon in the 2007 NRL season. He was named in the Samoa training squad for the 2008 Rugby League World Cup. Puletua remained at Penrith until the end of the 2010 NRL season. Puletua's final game for the club was their 34–12 semi-final loss against the Sydney Roosters.

== Post-playing ==
After retiring from rugby league he became the creative producer at the Casula Powerhouse Arts Centre. In September 2013 Puletua gave the 15th annual Tom Brock Lecture.
