= 4BH =

Radio station in Brisbane, Queensland, Australia

Coordinates: 27°21′31.5″S 153°5′23″E

- Australia
- Broadcast area: Brisbane RA1 ()
- Frequency: 1116 kHz (also on DAB+)
- Branding: Classic Hits 4BH

Programming
- Language: English
- Format: Classic hits

Ownership
- Owner: Tapt Media; (Radio Magic Brisbane Pty Ltd)
- Operator: Ace Radio
- Sister stations: 2UE; 3MP; Magic 1278

History
- First air date: 2 January 1932; 94 years ago
- Former frequencies: 882 kHz (1978–2021); 1390 kHz (1932–1976); 880 kHz (1976–1978)
- Call sign meaning: 4 = Queensland; Bald Hills

Technical information
- Power: 17 kW Daytime 6.3 kW Night Time

Links
- Website: http://www.4bh.com.au

4BH is a radio station in Brisbane, the state capital of Queensland, Australia. It broadcasts on a frequency of 1116 kHz in the AM radio band and is simulcasted in DAB+ on channel 9B. It is owned by Tapt Media and run under a lease agreement by Ace Radio.

From Friday 8 October 2021, 4BH moved to 1116 kHz, formerly used by its sister station, 4BC, with that station moving to 882 kHz, which 4BH had used.

== History ==
=== 4BH ===
"4BH FOR BRIGHTER HOURS." This was the motto of Queensland's newest radio station 4BH which was opened by J. S. Kerr M.L.A on 2 January 1932. Transmitting from Bald Hills) with their studio located on the second floor of the premises of Messrs. G. J. Grice Ltd., A music shop located at 90–92 Queen Street, Brisbane. 4BH provided a letterbox/suggestion box at the front of the store for musical requests and other suggestions, in order to garner public affection. Mr. Walter Pym of Station 4QG was the station manager and Miss Ivy Ray was one of the first female radio announcers.

4BH continued to dominate Brisbane radio during the 1960s, and under the management of Norm Llewellyn promoted itself as "Top Dog Radio" with a contemporary Top 40 music format. In the 1950s and 1960s George Lovejoy provided commentary on Brisbane rugby league matches for the station and in (year) replaced Llewellyn as general manager. During the Lovejoy years, the station was branded a "Happy Day Radio". Some of the well-known announcers were Bill Gates, Ben Beckinsale, David Wildman, Russ Walkington, Ken Guy, Ken Smith, Peter Kay, John Flemming, Jimmy White, and John Kerr. With the emergence of 4IP into the marketplace with a similar Top 40 format, 4BH added talkback programmes led by Ivor Hancock and supported by a well-known lineup including Don Seccombe, Babette Stephens, Gabby Horan, Peter Clark, Jim Iliffe, Owen Delaney, Father Stephen Freshwater, Jennifer Blocksidge and Pat Thompson. Bob Ackery joined the station in the early 1970s and became the "drive time" announcer before moving into the "breakfast" slot, later taking on the role of programme manager and eventually general manager in the late 1980s. He took over from Barry Augustus, who led the station through one of its most successful periods through the late 1970s and 1980s. This included a frequency change from 1390 kHz to 880 kHz in the mid-1970s and from 880 kHz to 882 kHz on 23 November 1978, a relocation of the transmitter from Bald Hills to Wynnum West and a move from its old Adelaide Street home to purpose-built studios at Astor Terrace, Spring Hill.

In 1988, the station was sold to a local consortium.

In 1975, 4BH started broadcasting "Beautiful Music", which became their focus except for a period in 1994 when the station converted to talk which was up against 4BH's now sister station 4BC and 612 4QR Brisbane. George Lovejoy was replaced in 1975 by Warren Stagg. The station successfully bid for an FM license (conversion) in 1990 but was unable to afford the conversion. 4BK was the highest bidder and went on to become B105. 4KQ was the 3rd highest bidder but also failed to produce the required money. In 1995, after the disastrous Talk format experiment, 4BH was placed in receivership and bought for just over $2 million by Michael Norris who was a Brisbane businessman and the major shareholder of Unitel and the Ipswich and West Moreton Broadcasting Corp. 4BH was relocated from Spring Hill to shared studios at the 106.9 QFM building in North Ipswich (now River 94.9).

Between 1995 and 1997, 4BH returned to the top two ratings position. In January 1997 Michael Norris sold 4BH to the Australian Radio Network (owners of 4KQ) for over $11.5 million, who owned 4BH until January 2002 after ARN and DMG Radio Australia jointly launched 97.3 FM, so ARN sold 4BH to DMG and in February 2003, 4BH was sold yet again to Southern Cross Broadcasting because DMG had won an auction to set up an FM service on the Sunshine Coast.

In August 2002, the station's transmitting antenna in Wynnum West was felled by vandals, causing the station to go off air. The station returned to air a few days later on low power. Two teenagers were eventually charged and pleaded guilty. It later emerged that the reason for the attack was due to a dislike of the transmitter site and also of the station's music.

In 2004, the station moved to new purpose-built premises at Cannon Hill.

4BH 882 celebrated 75 years of broadcasting in May 2007. A Gala Dinner was hosted at the Sofitel Hotel in Brisbane, the event was attended by former announcers and guests

Since November 2007, 4BH, like all Southern Cross Broadcasting radio stations, has been owned by Fairfax Media.

=== Magic 882 ===
On 13 January 2014, 4BH rebranded itself as Magic 882, with a new positioner of "The songs you know and love". The rebrand came with changes to the on-air lineup – Moyd Kay moved from afternoons at sister 4BC to breakfast at Magic; Ian Keenan joined the team from rival 4KQ into mornings; and Greg Victor moving from mornings to drive.

In November 2015, it was announced that the station would begin taking network programming from sister station Magic 1278 in Melbourne. The stations on-air presenters and a number of administration staff were made redundant.

=== Talking Lifestyle 882 ===
In February 2017, the Macquarie Radio Network announced that Magic 882 would be relaunched as Talking Lifestyle from Monday 27 February. The launch of Talking Lifestyle into the Melbourne and Brisbane markets followed 18 months of development by Macquarie Media and a soft launch in the Sydney market, from September 2016. Presenters for the station broadcast from either Sydney or Melbourne. The on-air line-up included Ed Phillips, Catriona Rowntree, Nick Bennett, Dee Dee Dunleavy and Sabina Read.

=== Macquarie Sports Radio ===
On Wednesday 4 April 2018, the three Talking Lifestyle branded stations relaunched with a new sports radio format under the name Macquarie Sports Radio with coverage of the 2018 Commonwealth Games. The Brisbane Station broadcasts Matches from the Brisbane Lions and Gold Coast Suns plus a Selection of AFL Matches from 3AW as well as Thursday Night and the Early Friday Night NRL Game from NRL Nation.

=== Return of 4BH ===
On 21 January 2020, Nine Entertainment announced the Macquarie Sports Radio brand would be abandoned and the station – along with its interstate sister stations 2UE and Magic 1278 – would return to an all-music format "built around the best of the ''50s, '60s and '70s" with a "soft launch" on 2 February 2020. In April, Steve Jacobs was announced as the station's latest breakfast presenter, commencing 27 April.

=== Ace Radio Operations ===
On 28 October 2021, Nine Radio and Ace Radio entered into a deal for Ace to manage the radio station, along with sister stations Magic 1278 and 2UE from early 2022. Ace Radio took control of the station on 14 January 2022. The station relaunched as Brisbane's New Home of Classic hits with Brisbane radio personality BBQ Bob Gallagher on the More Music Breakfast. with a new presenter line-up, logo and imaging Classic hits 4BH has improved in the ratings.
