= Ian Keenan =

Australian radio announcer

Ian Keenan (born 14 October) is an Australian radio announcer and creator of the website Hitstories.net.

== Radio ==
His is a long career which began in 1979. Keenan has been a broadcaster for radio stations in Murray Bridge, South Australia (5MU); Mount Isa, Queensland (4LM); Muswellbrook, New South Wales (2NM); Newcastle, New South Wales (2KO); Townsville, Queensland (4TO); Brisbane, Queensland (4KQ and Magic 882).

Whilst at 4TO in Townsville he achieved the position of Programme Director and helped to maintain the station's number one ranking across all shifts and all demographics.

In Brisbane at Radio 4KQ he was employed for over 20 years before being approached by Fairfax Radio to help re-launch Radio 4BH as Magic 882.

After a year as daytime announcer he was moved to the Breakfast Shift

In November 2015 following a merger between Fairfax Radio and Macquarie Radio virtually all the Brisbane staff of Magic 882 including Keenan were made redundant as the decision was implemented to broadcast all the programme content from Melbourne, Victoria and Magic 1278. In Brisbane only one member of the on air staff was retained.

Following the decision to network Magic 882 ratings slumped to 2.1% (Source: GfK Survey 2, 2016 Share Movement by Session, P10+) as compared to 4.3% (Source GfK Survey 2, 2015 Share Movement by Session, P10+) whilst the Breakfast Shift previously hosted by Keenan saw a fall from 4.7% (Source: GfK Survey 2, 2015 Share Movement by Session, P10+) to 1.7% (Source: GfK Survey 2, 2016 Share Movement by Session, P10+)

== Hitstories.net ==
Since his departure from full-time radio Keenan has developed the website www.histories.net The website utilises his archives and features interviews with music artists predominantly from the 1960s, 1970s and 1980s. The website features both Australian and International artists and is a work in progress.

== Other work ==
Keenan is also a licensed auctioneer in the State of Queensland. He currently works in the real estate industry as a sales agent in Kenmore, Qld and still occasionally works as an MC/compere.
