= Lions Series Trophy =

- Sport: Rugby union
- Instituted: 2021; 5 years ago
- Number of teams: 4; British & Irish Lions; Australia; New Zealand; South Africa
- Current series winners: British and Irish Lions (2025)

The Lions Series Trophy (Afrikaans: Lions-reeks-trofee; Māori: Raiona Raupapatanga Paraihe) is a rugby union trophy awarded to the winner of each British & Irish Lions test series.

== Background ==
The trophy was designed and crafted by Thomas Lyte, a British silversmith and goldsmith and royal warrant holder to King Charles III.

For Australia the trophy replaced the Tom Richards Cup, which had been contested between them and the British & Irish Lions since 2001.

== Winners ==
Year	Date	Venue	Home	Score	Away	Winner
2021; South Africa	24 July	Cape Town Stadium, Cape Town	South Africa	17–22	British & Irish Lions	
2021; South Africa	31 July	Cape Town Stadium, Cape Town	South Africa	27–9	British & Irish Lions	
2021; South Africa	7 August	Cape Town Stadium, Cape Town	South Africa	19–16	British & Irish Lions	
2025; Australia	19 July	Lang Park, Brisbane	Australia	19–27	British & Irish Lions	
2025; Australia	26 July	Melbourne Cricket Ground, Melbourne	Australia	26–29	British & Irish Lions	
2025; Australia	2 August	Stadium Australia, Sydney	Australia	22–12	British & Irish Lions	
