= George Lovejoy =

Australian radio sports commentator

George Lovejoy (15 December 1923 – 4 February 2003) was an Australian radio sports commentator who is known for his broadcasts of Queensland rugby league football matches in the 1950s and 1960s. He called rugby league for 19 years – 652 games straight – and coined the phrase 'the greatest game of all'.

Nicknamed "Mr Football", Lovejoy worked for the 4BH station and was a household name in Queensland in the days before television was widespread. A plaque commemorating his career adorns Suncorp Stadium's Sports Media Hall of Fame.

The Australian Society of Sports History's annual George Lovejoy Memorial lecture is named after him and was inaugurated in 2009. Delivered in Brisbane, it is in the same mould as New South Wales' Tom Brock Lecture.
