= Lang Park =

Multi-purpose stadium in Milton, Queensland, Australia

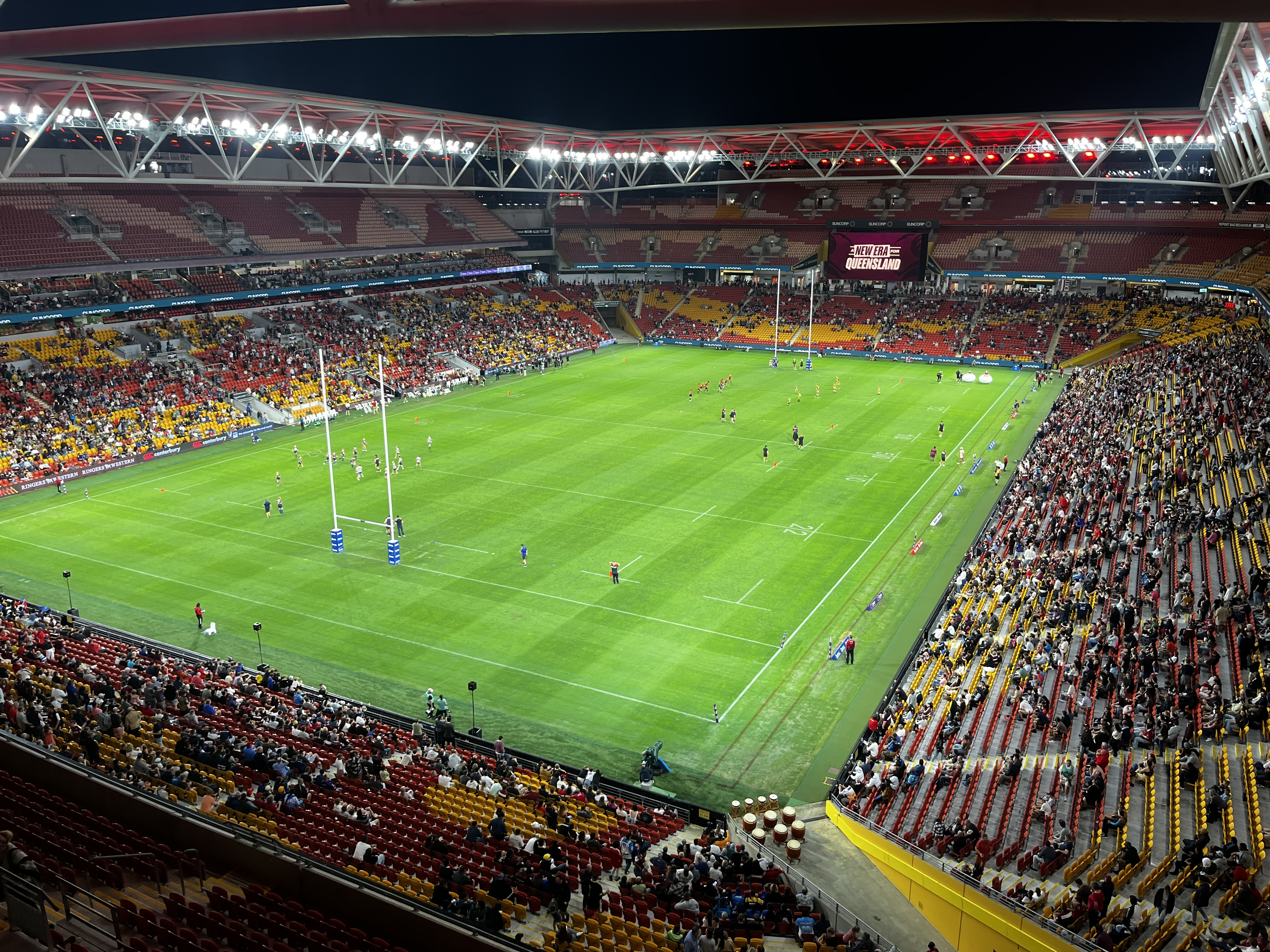
- Lang Park in April 2024
- Interactive map of Lang Park
- Former names: Suncorp-Metway Stadium
- Address: 40 Castlemaine Street, Milton
- Location: Brisbane, Queensland, Australia
- Coordinates: 27°27′53″S 153°0′34″E
- Owner: Stadiums Queensland (2003–present)
- Operator: Legends Global
- Capacity: 52,500
- Surface: Grass (Strathayr turf)
- Record attendance: 59,185 (2022/23 Ed Sheeran)
- Field size: 136 x 82 m
- Field shape: Rectangular
- Public transit: Milton, Roma Street

Construction
- Groundbreaking: 1911; 115 years ago
- Opened: 1914; 112 years ago
- Cost: A$280 million (2003 redevelopment)
- Architects: HOK Sport & PDT Architects in Association
- Structural engineer: Ove Arup & Partners

Tenants
- Rugby league Brisbane Broncos (NRL) (1988–1992; 2003–present); Dolphins (NRL) (2023–present); South Queensland Crushers (NRL) (1995-1997); Queensland rugby league team (1980–2000; 2003–present); Brisbane Broncos Women (NRLW; selected matches); Australia national rugby league team (selected matches) Rugby union Queensland Reds (Super Rugby) (2005–present); Australia national rugby union team (selected matches) Association football Brisbane Roar (A-League Men) (2005–2020; 2022–present); Brisbane Roar Women (A-League Women; selected matches); Australia men's soccer team (selected matches); Australia women's soccer team (selected matches)

Website
- suncorpstadium.com.au

Lang Park (officially named Brisbane Stadium (Lang Park) and known under naming rights as Suncorp Stadium) is a multi-purpose stadium located in the Brisbane suburb of Milton. It is primarily used for rugby league, rugby union, and soccer as the home ground of the Brisbane Broncos, and the Dolphins in the National Rugby League (NRL), the Queensland Reds in Super Rugby, and Brisbane Roar FC in the A-League Men. It also frequently hosts the Australia national rugby union team, Australia women's national soccer team and the Australia men's national soccer team.

Lang Park was established in 1914, on the site of the former North Brisbane Cemetery; in its early days it was home to a number of different sports, including cycling, athletics and soccer. The lease of the park was taken over by the Brisbane Rugby League in 1957, and has since become a major home of Rugby League in Queensland, gaining the nickname "the Cauldron". The stadiums most recent major redevelopment came in 2003, which brought its total capacity to 52,500 spectators. Since 1994 Australian Insurer Suncorp Group have owned naming rights to the stadium.

The stadium is a host venue in the annual State of Origin series, where it is the home ground of the Queensland rugby league team. It has also been the venue for the NRL’s Magic Round since its introduction in 2019. The stadium was a venue in the 2023 FIFA Women’s World Cup, where it hosted 8 matches, including the third place playoff. It’s also been a venue in the 2003 Rugby World Cup, the 2015 AFC Asian Cup, and the 2008 Rugby League World Cup, hosting the final. It has been the host of two Super Rugby grand finals, with the Queensland Reds winning on both occasions. The stadium is set to host Rugby Sevens, and the final for Football in the 2032 Summer Olympics. It has also been the host of numerous special events and concerts.

== History ==
=== Origins ===
The site of Lang Park was originally the North Brisbane Cemetery, and until 1875 was Brisbane's primary cemetery. By 1911, the area was heavily populated, so the Paddington Cemeteries Act (1911) was introduced, and the site was redeveloped as a recreational site. In 1914, it was fenced off and named Lang Park after John Dunmore Lang. It was used as a parade ground during World War I.

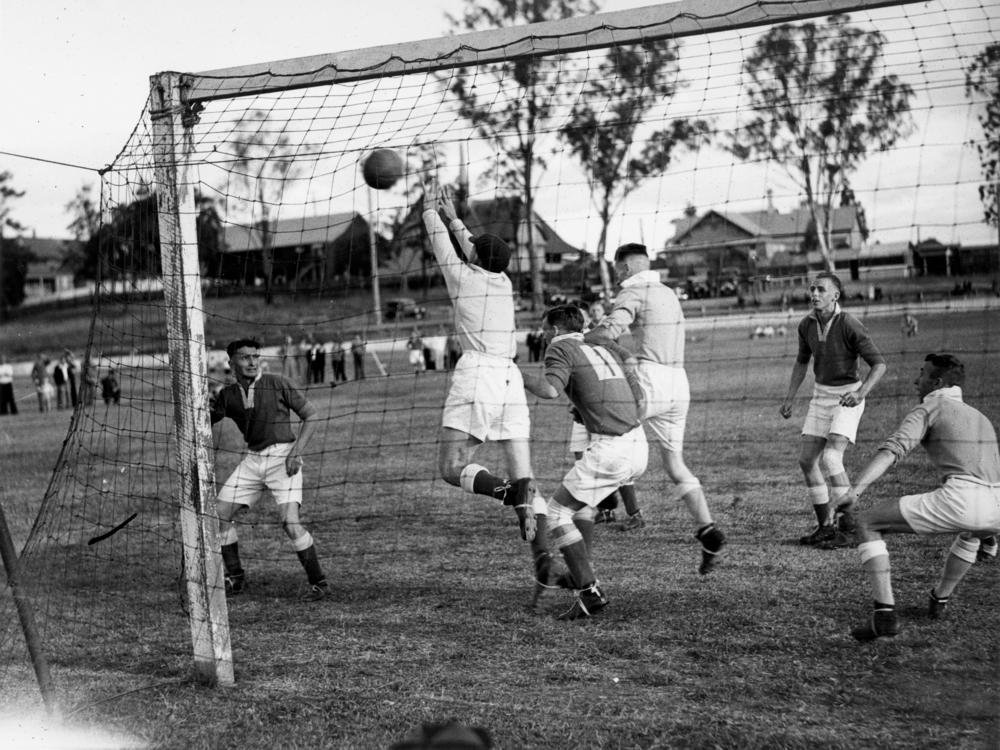
1937 soccer match at Lang Park Milton (looking towards Hale Street and Milton Road). Latrobe (in the dark jerseys) playing Bundamba Rangers

In 1932, the ground was leased by the Queensland Amateur Athletics Association (QAAA). In 1935, the Queensland Soccer Council (QSC) became a sub-tenant of the QAAA, with a view to using it as the home ground for Brisbane soccer fixtures (leaving its former home, The Gabba). The Latrobe Soccer Club, in turn, became a sub-tenant of the QSC, using the ground for its home games.

However, by 1937, the QSC was considering sub-leasing Lang Park to "another code of football" (most likely Western Suburbs Rugby League) as it "was not satisfied with the financial returns ... under the sub-lease to the Latrobe-Milton club". Latrobe in turn responded that "'If no action Is taken to introduce the Ipswich clubs into the Brisbane competition this' season ... the Latrobe-Milton Club cannot accept an increase in rental for Lang Park. Give us competition play with Ipswich and my club will hold the ground as headquarters for the code."

On 11 February 1950, the official opening of the Lang Park Police Citizens Youth Club took place and youth activities commenced because of the concerns with the increase of juvenile delinquency. Activities such as boxing, wrestling, basketball and gymnastics all occur at these premises to this day. Contemporaneous records are scant, but it appears the QSC did not renew the lease the ground after the intervening World War II. In 1953 the Brisbane Rugby League (BRL) amalgamated with the Queensland Rugby League (QRL). QRL secretary Ron McAullife negotiated a 21-year lease of Lang Park from the Brisbane City Council in order to give the QRL a financially viable base of operations. The park had only the most basic facilities, and the QRL contributed £17,000 to its development. Lang Park hosted its first game of first grade rugby league during the 1930s, with regular BRL games commencing there in 1955. In 1958, it hosted its first Brisbane rugby league grand final in which Brothers defeated Valleys 22 points to 7. A record crowd of 19,824 saw Northern Suburbs defeat Fortitude Valley at Lang Park in the BRL grand final in September 1961.

In the 1960s, Fonda Metassa famously burst from the back of an ambulance to return to the field after being carted off injured in a match for Norths against Redcliffe. As the ground was used increasingly by the QRL, it became no longer viable for use as a public recreation facility due to spoilage of the running track. In 1962, the Lang Park Trust was created under an act of Parliament. This allowed for the construction of the Frank Burke Stand (1962), Ron McAuliffe Stand (1975), and the Western Grandstand (1994). The Trust had on its board one member from the Queensland Government, one member from the Brisbane City Council, two members from the Queensland Rugby League and one member from the Brisbane Rugby League.

From the 1960s, Lang Park hosted interstate and international rugby league, including the inaugural State of Origin match. It was the home ground of the Western Suburbs Panthers until 1972 when they moved to their new facilities at Purtell Park in Bardon.

=== NSWRL/ARL years ===
In 1988, the Brisbane Broncos entered the NSWRL premiership along with the Gold Coast Chargers and the Newcastle Knights. The Broncos played out of Lang Park from 1988 until 1992, when they moved to the 60,000 capacity ANZ Stadium, the stadium for the 1982 Commonwealth Games. The move occurred due to a dispute over the Broncos sponsor, Power's Brewery, being a competitor of the QRL's sponsor XXXX.

In 1994, Lang Park was renamed to the Suncorp Stadium after naming sponsorship was attained by Queensland financial institution, Suncorp. Also in 1994, the Western Stand was built, replacing the Frank Burke Stand. On 25 May 1997, the 1996/1997 National Soccer League Grand final was played in front of then a capacity crowd of 40,446, where the Brisbane Strikers FC defeated Sydney United FC 2–0.

=== Redevelopment ===
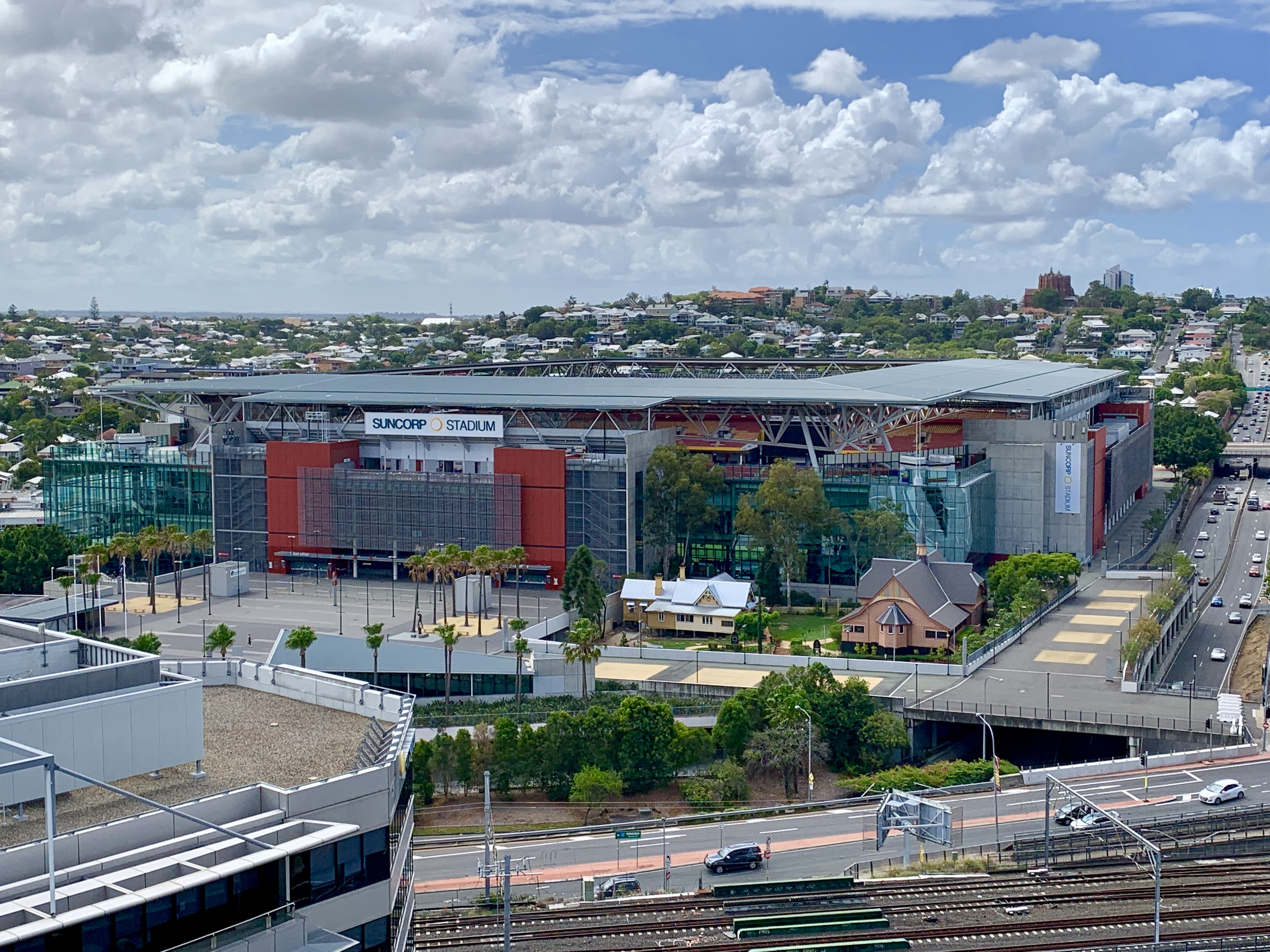
The stadium in March 2019

Lang Park was heavily redeveloped in the early 2000s into a 52,500 all-seater state of the art rectangular stadium.

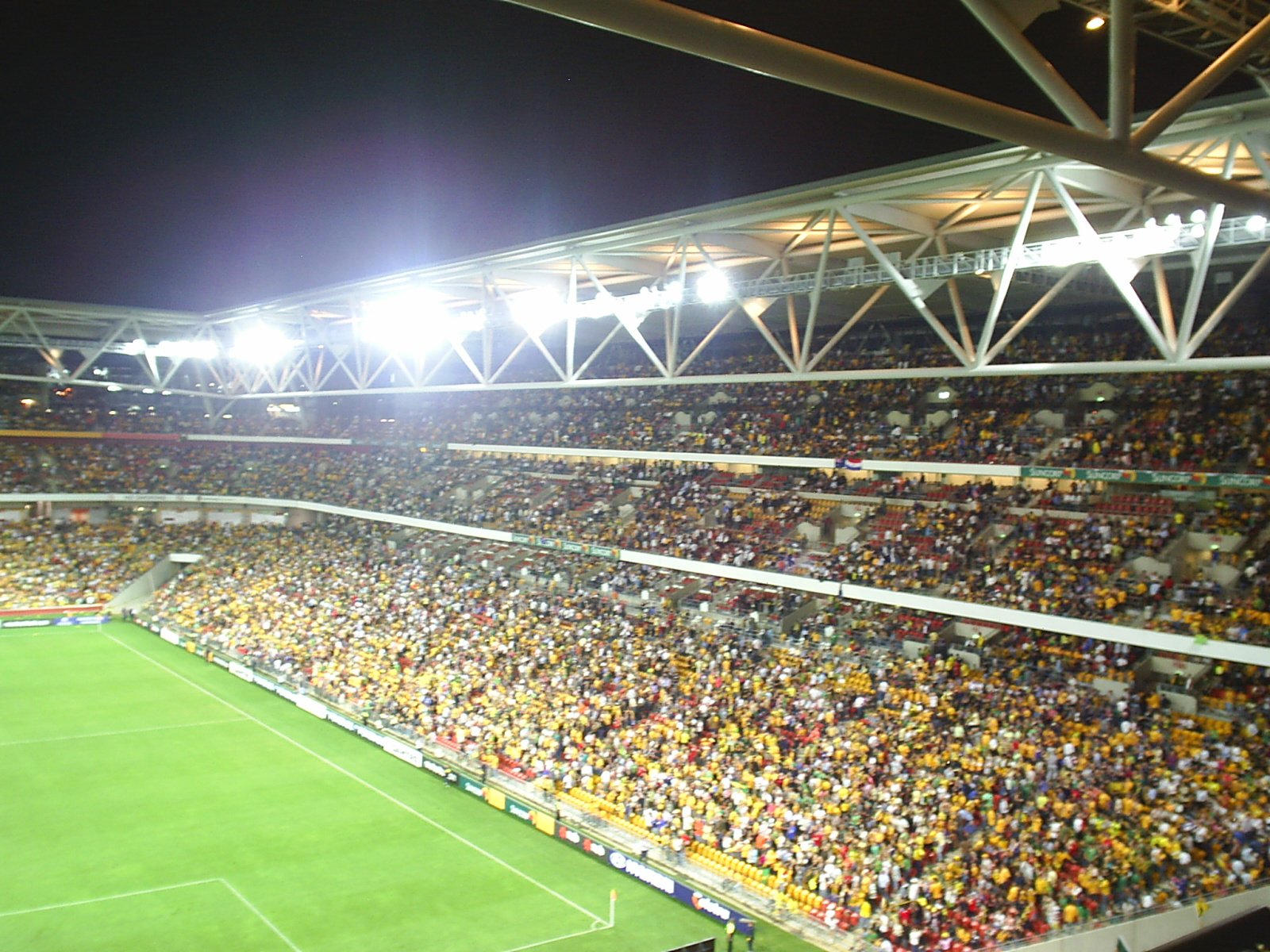
Suncorp Stadium before the Australia vs Paraguay soccer international in October 2006.

Lang Park suffered significant damage during the 2010–2011 Queensland floods with the entire playing field being covered by flood water. An electrical fire started in a transformer room due to water ingress, however there was no major damage from the fire.

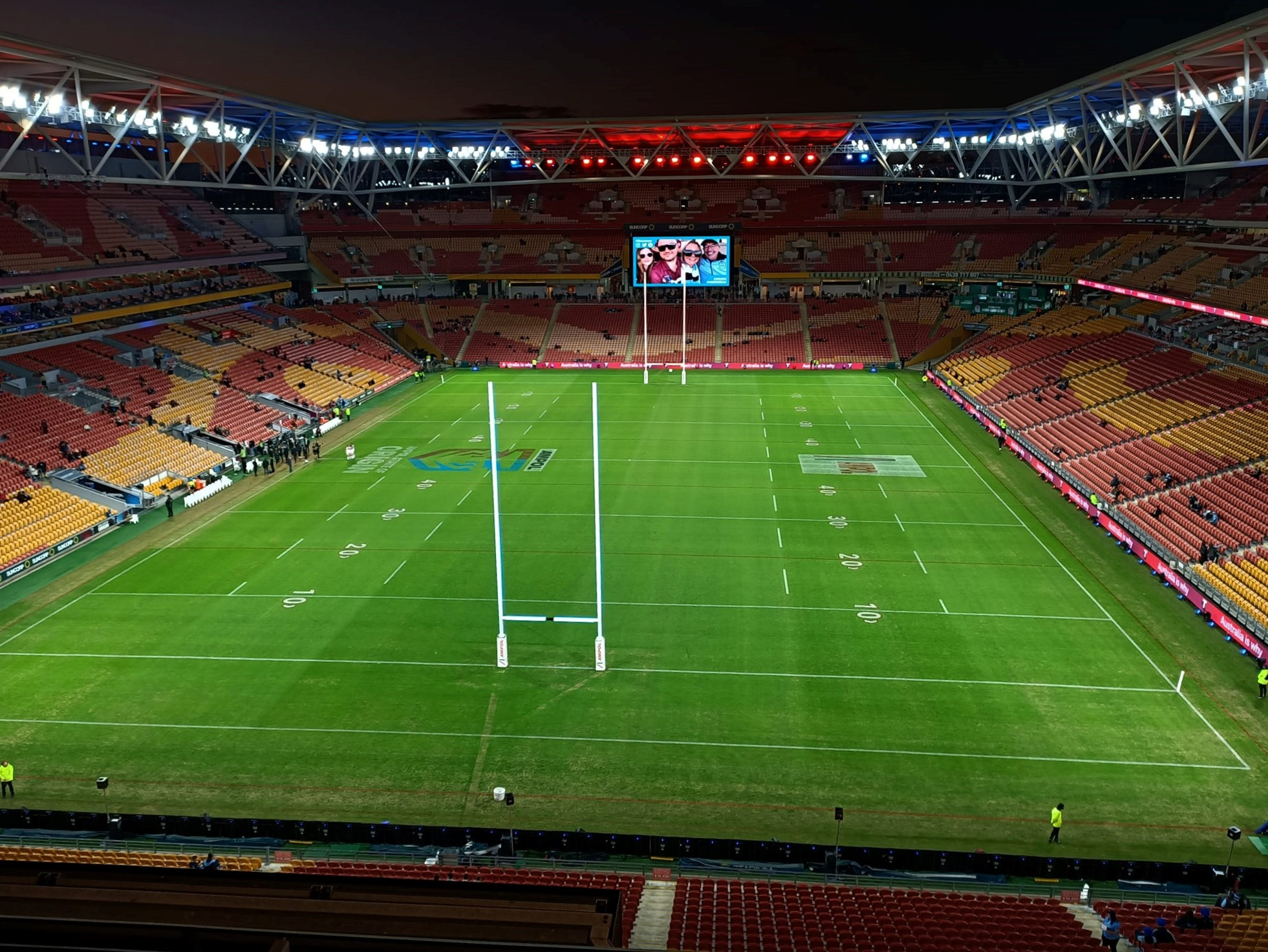
View of playing field from southern end, 13 July 2022.

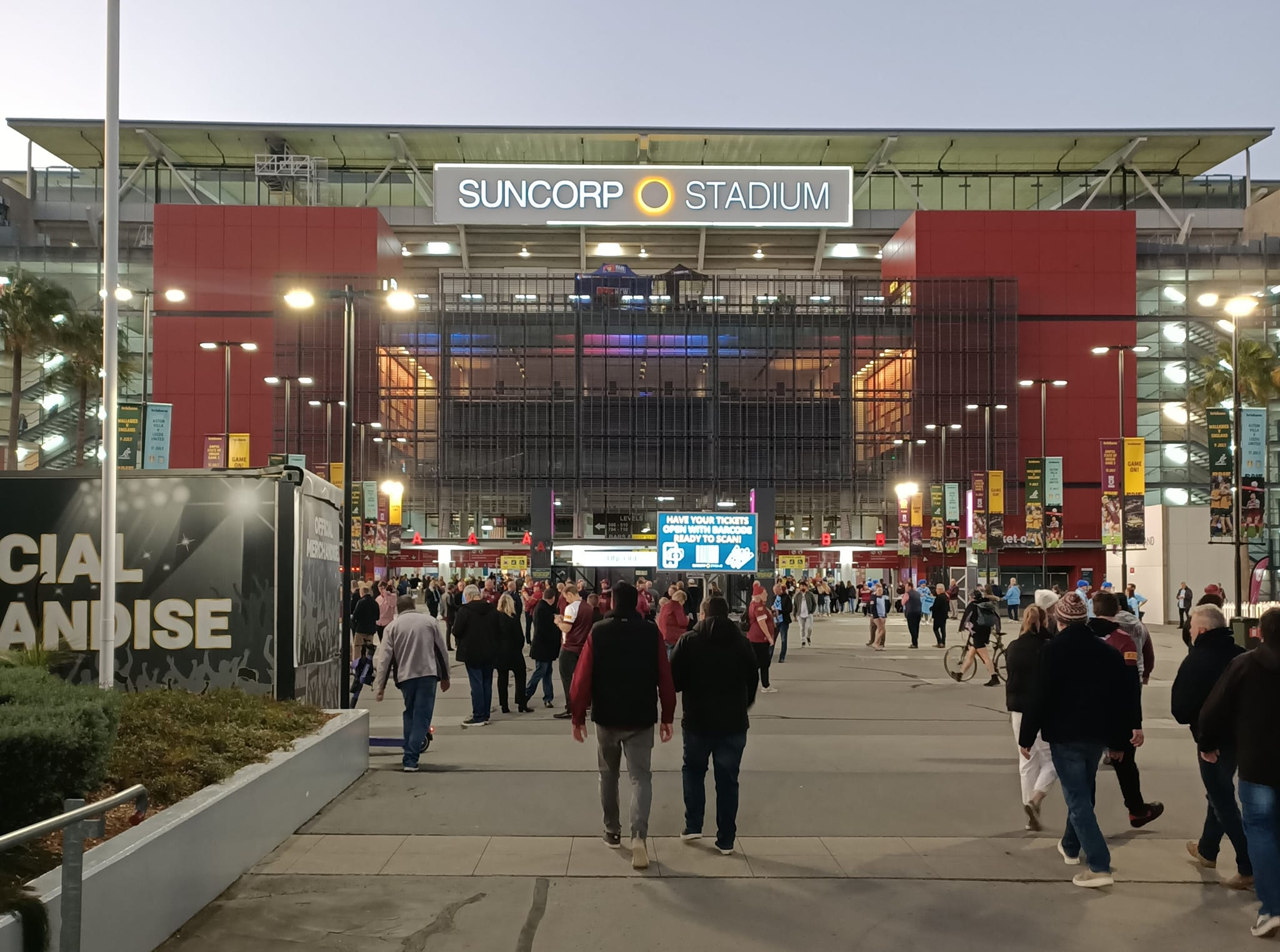
Suncorp Stadium southern entrance, 13 July 2022

Although the stadium has been the traditional home of rugby league in Queensland, it has also become the state's premier venue for soccer, as well as rugby union. The re-developed stadium first hosted rugby union games at the 2003 Rugby World Cup.

In 2005, the newly established football team Queensland Roar of the A-League also elected to play their home games at Suncorp Stadium.

In 2006, the stadium became the new home of the Queensland Reds Super Rugby team when they moved from their former home at Ballymore Stadium. This move caused some disquiet amongst rugby traditionalists, however was accepted by Queensland Rugby Union CEO Theo Psaros, who said that "our hearts may be at Ballymore but our heads say it's time to move."

New Zealand rugby journalist Wynne Gray called Suncorp Stadium perhaps the best rugby stadium in the world. "It is so intimate you can hear the smack of bodies, the boot on leather, you feel the power and rhythm of the games."

On 29 July 2006, the Bledisloe Cup clash between the Wallabies and the All Blacks returned to Brisbane for the first time in over a decade for the 2006 Tri Nations Series. Though Australia narrowly lost the match, the game saw a new ground record set for crowd size, at 52,498.

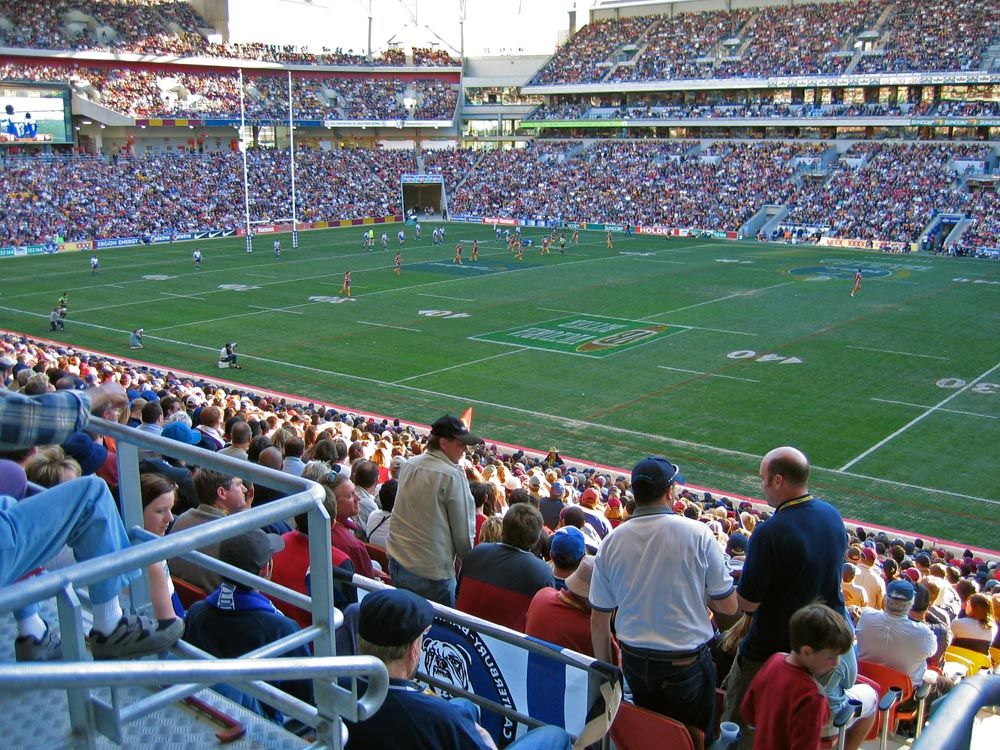
Inside Suncorp Stadium during an NRL game

A month later on 7 October the stadium hosted a 1–1 friendly soccer game between Australia and Paraguay in which Tony Vidmar, Stan Lazaridis, Zeljko Kalac and goal scorer Tony Popovic all retired from international soccer.

On 8 November 2006, a crowd of 44,358 saw the Great Britain national rugby league team play against Australia for the last time.

In 2009, the stadium was ranked 2nd to Cardiff's Millennium Stadium and more highly than London's Twickenham Stadium.

On 13 and 14 December 2006, the stadium hosted its first music concert since the 1980s and the stadium's redevelopment when Robbie Williams performed in front of two sell-out crowds during his "Close Encounters" tour of Australia, and was the venue for the U2 360° Tour in December 2010. That same month the stadium hosted Bon Jovi as part of The Circle Tour.

The Stadium was also the site of the 2011 A-League Grand Final, drawing a crowd of over 50,000. The match was one of the most dramatic in A-League history, with the Brisbane Roar scoring two goals in the last five minutes to level the scores with the Central Coast Mariners after several hundred home supporters had left the stadium early, many returning after hearing the stadium erupt while waiting for the train. The Roar went on to win 4–2 in the penalty shootout, making for an incredible victory.

The stadium is also home to the Lang Park Police Citizens Youth Club.

American Singer-Songwriter Taylor Swift played at Suncorp Stadium for her Red Tour on 7 December 2013.

In September 2016, it was announced that the video screens, originally installed in 2003, would be replaced. Construction started on the new video screens in March 2017 and was finished in early May 2017 in time for an NRL double header.

In 2019, the stadium hosted the NRL's inaugural Magic Round, in which all eight matches in a single round are played at the one venue. The NRL has an agreement to host its Magic Round in Brisbane until the 2027 season. The 2025 Magic Round was held at Suncorp Stadium from 1 to 4 May 2025 with a total attendance of 149,329.

In 2020, the Melbourne Storm played their "home" finals at the venue, as it was not possible for the team to play them at its regular home ground, AAMI Park, due to the state of Victoria being locked down during the state's second wave of coronavirus infections.

On 26 June 2021, the Queensland Maroons played at home against the New South Wales Blues in the State of Origin series. Queensland lost the game 26–0, and henceforth the series.

Due to a COVID-19 lockdown in New South Wales, which began on 26 June 2021 and was still in effect into October, the stadium hosted twenty-one extra games on top of its normal commitments to the Brisbane Broncos as well as Magic Round, including the 2021 NRL Grand Final on 3 October 2021. This was the second time that a rugby league premiership Grand Final was played outside of Sydney, following the 1997 Super League Grand Final.

In October 2025, the Premier of Queensland, David Crisafulli, announced that the stadium would receive a "next generation" renovation in time for the 2032 Summer Olympics. The stadium is expected to receive accessibility improvements, and an expansion in capacity. Plans for the Olympic redevelopment were unveiled in June 2026, which include wraparound LED video screens, "supersized" scoreboards, media mesh screens fitted at both ends of the stadium, new terrace viewing platforms and entertainment zones with both seated and standing areas, new external screens, and an increase in capacity to 54,000 fans, with construction set to begin by the end of 2026.

=== Average attendance per team ===
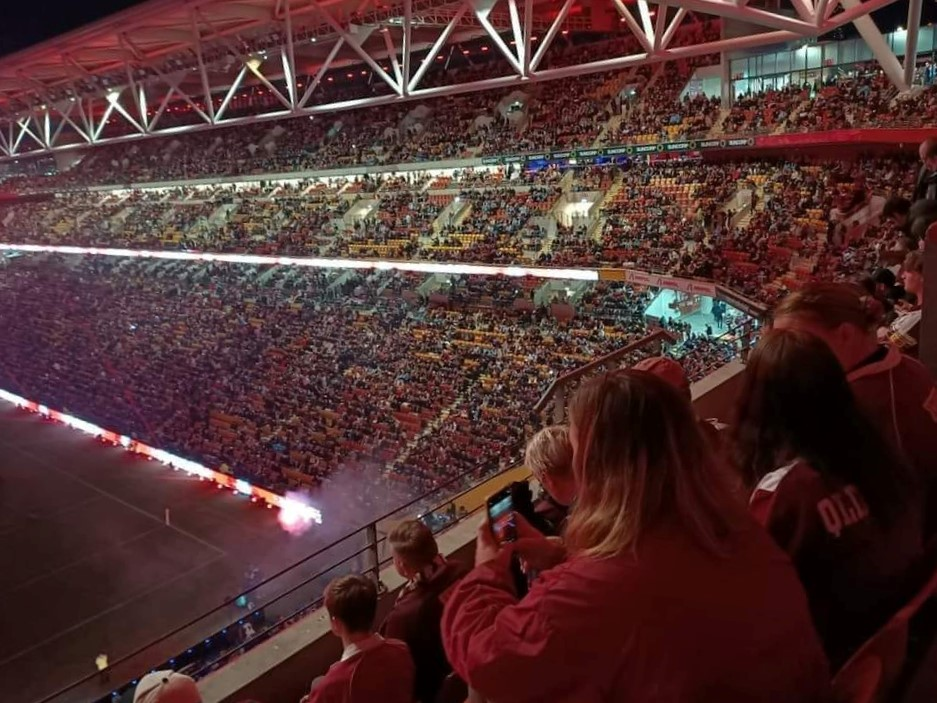
2022 State of Origin rugby league, Queensland Maroons v NSW Blues

Team	Sport	Average	Season
Queensland Maroons	Rugby league	52,433 (only one game)	2023
Brisbane Broncos (NRL)	Rugby league	41,612	2023
Dolphins (NRL)	Rugby league	29,516	2023
Brisbane Roar	Association football	18,556	2007–08
Queensland Reds	Rugby union	14,516	2024

== Popular culture ==
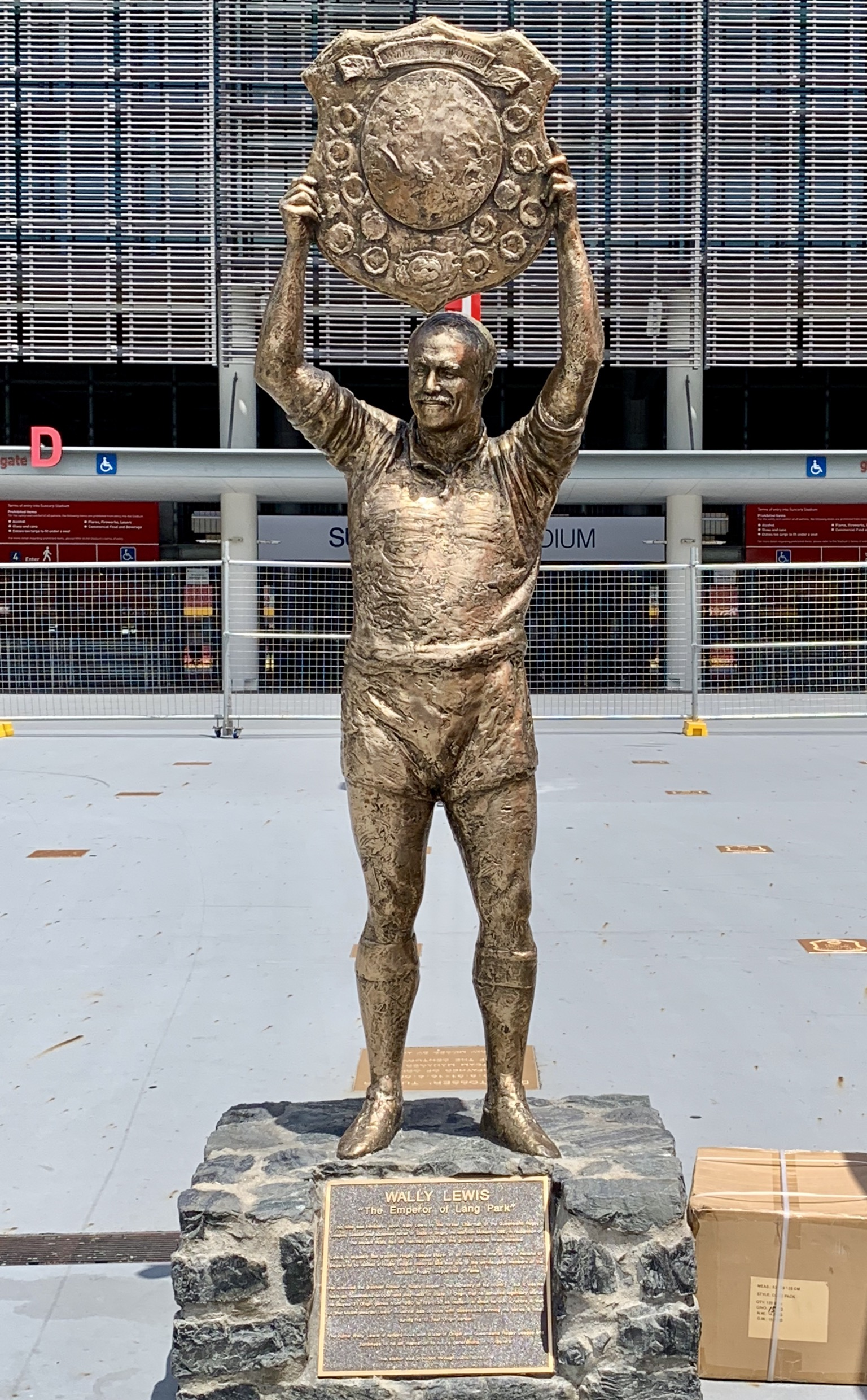
Wally Lewis statue outside Suncorp Stadium (Lang Park), Brisbane (2022)

In the 1980s, Brisbane rugby league icon Wally Lewis became known as The Emperor of Lang Park after his performances in State of Origin matches played at the ground. Brisbane-based beer XXXX, which is brewed at the nearby Castlemaine Brewery, ran a television advertisement celebrating this title in song:

Here's to Wally Lewis for lacing on a boot
Sometimes he plays it rugged, sometimes he plays it cute
He slices through a backline like a Stradbroke Island shark
There's glue on all his fingers, he's the Emperor of Lang Park

— Castlemaine Perkins XXXX advertisement

In 2006, Queensland Minister for Sport, Tom Barton introduced the Stadium's Sports Media Hall of Fame which honours the achievements of media representatives who have covered the major football codes played at this historic ground over the past 40 years. So far, there are five inductees: rugby league commentator George Lovejoy, rugby league journalists Jack Reardon, Steve Ricketts, Gerry Collins and Frank O'Callaghan.

=== Statues ===
There are several commemorative bronze statues outside the stadium:

- Wally Lewis (Rugby league)
- Darren Lockyer (Rugby league)
- Mal Meninga (Rugby league)
- Arthur Beetson (Rugby league)
- John Eales (Rugby union)
- Allan Langer (Rugby league)
- The Matildas 2023 World Cup team (Soccer)

== Awards ==
In 2009, as part of the Q150 celebrations, Suncorp Stadium (Lang Park) was announced as one of the Q150 Icons of Queensland for its role as a "structure and engineering feat".

== Concerts ==
Date	Performer(s)	Attendance	Notes
13–14 December 2006	Robbie Williams	52,411 (13th) 52,471 (14th) 104,992 (total)	
22 January 2008	The Police	25,391	
3–4 December 2008	André Rieu	24,236 (3rd) 22,599 (4th) 46,835 (total)	
8–9 December 2010	U2	44,352 (8th) 39,659 (9th) 84,011 (total)	
14 December 2010	Bon Jovi	40,520	
21 November 2012	Coldplay	52,497	
13 July 2013	Queensland Music Festival's 'World's Biggest Orchestra'	9,680	
7 December 2013	Taylor Swift	37,342	
17 December 2013	Bon Jovi	41,376	
20 February 2014	Eminem	43,339	
11 February 2015	One Direction	32,889	
24 February 2015	Foo Fighters	39,851	
28 November 2015	Ed Sheeran	46,135	
5 December 2015	Taylor Swift	46,139	
6 December 2016	Coldplay	51,059	
13 March 2017	Justin Bieber	40,102	
9 December 2017	Paul McCartney	40,150	
25 January 2018	Foo Fighters	39,190	
20 & 21 March 2018	Ed Sheeran	53,127 (20th) 53,272 (21st) 106,399 (total)	
6 December 2018	Bon Jovi	32,652	
19 January 2019	Phil Collins	36,308	
12 November 2019	U2	45,810	
13 February 2020	Queen + Adam Lambert	39,756	
22 November 2022	Guns N' Roses	28,732	
21 January 2023	Elton John	43,500	
29 January 2023	Red Hot Chili Peppers	46,835	
17–19 February 2023	Ed Sheeran	57,900 (17th) 59,185 (18th) 58,853 (19th) 175,938 (total)	All three events broke the record for attendance
1 November 2023	Paul McCartney		
8 November 2023	Def Leppard & Mötley Crüe	18,428	
12 December 2023	Foo Fighters	47,585	
16 & 17 February 2024 17 March 2024	Pink	46,541 47,283 46,791	
26 October 2024	Travis Scott	46,773	
24 & 25 January 2025	Luke Combs	92,000	
12 November 2025	Metallica	45,900	
9 December 2025	Lady Gaga	49,146	
20–22 February 2026	Ed Sheeran		
20 November 2026	Robbie Williams		
17 & 18 December 2027	Zach Bryan		

== Accessibility ==
Controversially, the redevelopment was the first major sporting facility in Australia with no car parking, primarily due to concerns with traffic congestion in the surrounding residential neighbourhood. Instead, the stadium's is surrounded by pubs, restaurants, cafes, bars and the XXXX brewery. This together with dedicated pedestrian links to Milton railway station and Brisbane CBD adds to the match day experience and is seen as a model for new stadiums and large entertainment venues. The stadium redevelopment has been the catalyst for the Barracks urban renewal development at Petrie Terrace midway along the dedicated pedestrian link to the CBD.

Walking	Pedestrian access: Suncorp Stadium is within walking distance of the CBD area of Brisbane.
Ferry	CityCat: Suncorp Stadium is within walking distance of the Milton CityCat stop, which opened in January 2015.
Bus	Bus access: Suncorp Stadium is close to bus-stops for the; 375 City bus. The bus route is Bardon (outbound) – Stafford (via city – inbound).; 385 CityXpress "BUZ" bus. The bus route is The Gap (outbound) – City (inbound).; The BUZ bus runs every 10–15 minutes, 6am to 11pm, 7 days a week.: Frequent shuttle bus services are provided by Transport for Brisbane on match days and for special events, typically from the CBD, Chermside, Carindale and Eight Mile Plains to the bus station under the stadium concourse.
Train	Train access: Suncorp Stadium is easily accessible from Milton and Roma Street stations.; Ticket holders are granted free transport on match days: with additional trains scheduled to Milton before and after all major events.
Car	There is no public parking at the Stadium. However, paid parking stations are available within 10-minute walking distance in the CBD.

== Facts ==
Record crowd	52,540 – Rugby league, 12 July 2017; Queensland vs New South Wales; 2017 State of Origin series
Video screen	Yes (x2)
Lights	Yes
Sports played	Rugby league, Rugby union, Soccer
Annual events	State of Origin series, Bledisloe Cup, NRL Magic Round
Historic events	1968 Rugby League World Cup; 1975 Rugby League World Cup; 1977 Rugby League World Cup; Inaugural (1980) State of Origin Game; 1985-88 Rugby League World Cup; 1989-92 Rugby League World Cup; 1993 FIFA World Youth Championship – The first golden goal since the 1993 rule change by FIFA was by Australia against Uruguay in a Quarter Final match at the FIFA World Youth Championships at Suncorp Stadium, Qld, Australia; 1997 National Soccer League Grand Final – the record NSL Grand Final attendance until 2000; 2003 Rugby World Cup; 2008 Rugby League World Cup (plus the Final); 2011 Super Rugby Final; 2011 A-League Grand Final; 2015 A-League Grand Final; 2015 AFC Asian Cup; Manny Pacquiao vs. Jeff Horn – WBO Welterweight Championship bout 2017 Rugby League World Cup (plus the Final); 2021 NRL Grand Final; 2023 FIFA Women's World Cup; 2026 Rugby League World Cup (plus the Final)

== Notable events ==
=== 2003 Rugby World Cup ===
Date	Team #1	Result	Team #2	Round	Attendance
11 October 2003	France	61–18	Fiji	Pool B	46,795
15 October 2003	Fiji	19–18	United States	Pool B	30,990
18 October 2003	Australia	90–8	Romania	Pool A	48,778
20 October 2003	Scotland	39–15	United States	Pool B	46,796
24 October 2003	New Zealand	91–7	Tonga	Pool D	47,588
8 November 2003	Australia	33–16	Scotland	Quarterfinal	45,412
9 November 2003	England	28–17	Wales	Quarterfinal	45,252

=== 2015 AFC Asian Cup ===
Date	Time (UTC+10)	Team #1	Result	Team #2	Round	Attendance
10 January 2015	19:00	Saudi Arabia	0–1	China	Group B	12,557
12 January 2015	19:00	Jordan	0–1	Iraq	Group D	6,840
14 January 2015	19:00	China	2–1	Uzbekistan	Group B	13,674
16 January 2015	19:00	Iraq	0–1	Japan	Group D	22,941
17 January 2015	19:00	Australia	0–1	South Korea	Group A	48,513
19 January 2015	19:00	Iran	1–0	United Arab Emirates	Group C	11,394
22 January 2015	21:30	China	0–2	Australia	Quarter-finals	46,067

=== 2023 FIFA Women's World Cup ===
In 2023, the stadium hosted several matches of the 2023 FIFA Women's World Cup. Seating capacity for the matches was reduced to 49,461 due to media requirements.

Date	Time (UTC+10)	Team #1	Result	Team #2	Round	Attendance
22 July 2023	19:30	England	1–0	Haiti	Group D	44,369
27 July 2023	20:00	Australia	2–3	Nigeria	Group B	49,156
29 July 2023	20:00	France	2–1	Brazil	Group F	49,378
31 July 2023	19:00	Republic of Ireland	0–0	Nigeria	Group B	24,884
3 August 2023	20:00	South Korea	1–1	Germany	Group H	38,945
7 August 2023	17:30	England	0–0 (4–2 pen.)	Nigeria	Round of 16	49,461
12 August 2023	17:00	Australia	0–0 (7–6 pen.)	France	Quarter-final	49,461
19 August 2023	18:00	Sweden	2–0	Australia	Third place play-off	49,461

=== 2027 Men's Rugby World Cup ===
Date	Team #1	Result	Team #2	Round	Attendance
2 October 2027	England		Tonga	Pool F	
3 October 2027	Argentina		Canada	Pool C	
9 October 2027	France		Japan	Pool E	
10 October 2027	South Africa		Georgia	Pool B	
16 October 2027	Australia		Chile	Pool A	
17 October 2027	Scotland		Portugal	Pool D	
23 October 2027	1st Pool A		3rd Pool C/E/F	Round of 16	
24 October 2027	2nd Pool A		2nd Pool E	Round of 16	
30 October 2027	Winner R16 1		Winner R16 3	Quarterfinal	
31 October 2027	Winner R16 5		Winner R16 6	Quarterfinal	

=== Rugby league test matches ===
The venue has hosted forty-three Australia internationals. The results were as follows;

Game #	Date	Opponents	Result	Attendance	Part of
1	30 July 1962	Great Britain	10–17	34,766	1962 Ashes series
2	22 June 1963	New Zealand	13–16	30,748	1963 Trans-Tasman Test series
3	20 July 1963	South Africa	34–6	10,210	
4	4 July 1964	France	27–2	20,076	
4	16 July 1966	(United Kingdom) Great Britain	6–4	45,057	1966 Ashes series and pre redevelopment attendance record
5	1 July 1967	New Zealand	35–22	30,122	1967 Trans-Tasman Test series
6	1 June 1968	New Zealand	31–12	23,608	1968 World Cup
7	8 June 1968	France	37–4	32,664	1968 World Cup
8	6 June 1970	(United Kingdom) Great Britain	37–15	42,807	1970 Ashes series
9	15 July 1972	New Zealand	31–7	20,847	1972 Trans-Tasman Test series
10	1 June 1975	New Zealand	36–8	12,000	1975 World Cup
11	22 June 1975	France	26–6	9,000	1975 World Cup
12	18 June 1977	(United Kingdom) Great Britain	15–5	27,000	1977 World Cup
13	15 July 1978	New Zealand	38–7	14,000	1978 Trans-Tasman Test series
14	16 July 1979	(United Kingdom) Great Britain	35–0	23,051	1979 Ashes series
15	18 July 1981	France	17–2	14,000	
16	3 July 1982	New Zealand	11–8	11,400	1982 Trans-Tasman Test series
17	9 July 1983	New Zealand	12–19	15,000	1983 Trans-Tasman Test series
18	26 June 1984	(United Kingdom) Great Britain	18–6	26,534	1984 Ashes series
19	18 June 1985	New Zealand	26–20	22,000	1985 Trans-Tasman Test series
20	29 July 1986	New Zealand	32–12	22,811	1985–88 World Cup and 1986 Trans-Tasman Test series
21	21 July 1987	New Zealand	6–13	16,500	
22	28 June 1988	(United Kingdom) Great Britain	34–14	27,130	1988 Ashes series
23	31 July 1991	New Zealand	40–12	29,139	1989–92 World Cup and 1991 Trans-Tasman Test series
24	3 July 1992	(United Kingdom) Great Britain	16–10	32,313	1989–92 World Cup and 1992 Ashes series
25	30 June 1993	New Zealand	16–4	32,000	1993 Trans-Tasman Test series
26	23 June 1995	New Zealand	26–8	25,309	1995 Trans-Tasman Test series
27	14 July 1995	New Zealand	46–10	20,803	1995 Trans-Tasman Test series
28	11 July 1997	Rest of the World	28–8	14,927	Only test match played for the ARL test team for 1997
29	9 October 1998	New Zealand	30–12	18,501	
30	22 October 1999	(United Kingdom) Great Britain	42–6	12,511	1999 Tri-Nations
31	25 April 2005	New Zealand	32–16	40,317	2005 Anzac Test
32	5 May 2006	New Zealand	50–16	44,191	2006 Anzac Test
33	18 November 2006	(United Kingdom) Great Britain	33–10	44,358	2006 Tri-Nations
34	20 April 2007	New Zealand	30–6	35,241	2007 Anzac Test
35	23 November 2008	New Zealand	20–34	50,599	2008 World Cup final.
36	8 May 2009	New Zealand	38–10	37,152	2009 Anzac Test
37	13 November 2010	New Zealand	12–16	36,299	2010 Four Nations Final
38	25 October 2014	New Zealand	12–30	47,813*	2014 Four Nations
39	3 May 2015	New Zealand	12–26	32,681	2015 Anzac Test
40	23 November 2017	Fiji	54–6	22,073	2017 World Cup Semi-Final
41	2 December 2017	England	6–0	40,033	2017 World Cup final
42	18 October 2024	Tonga	18–0	33,196	2024 Pacific Championships
43	25 October 2026	Fiji	34–22	41,108	2026 World Cup
44	15 November 2026	New Zealand	32–12	52,461	2026 World Cup final. Record Test attendance at Lang Park

It also hosted three non Australia matches. Incidentally, they were all England matches. The first was a 1975 Rugby League World Cup match against Wales on 10 June 1975 with 6,000 in attendance and lost 12 – 7. The second was a 2008 Rugby League World Cup match against New Zealand on 15 November 2008 with 26,659 in attendance and lost 32 – 22. The third and final to date was a 2014 Four Nations match between against Samoa with 47,813 in attendance and was a double header which was followed by the Australia New Zealand match. England won 32 – 26.

Suncorp Stadium hosted two matches of the 2017 Rugby League World Cup. The venue played host to the first semi-final on 24 November and the tournament final on 2 December.

=== Rugby union internationals ===
Game #	Date	Competition	Home team		Away team		Attendance
1	27 July 1996	1996 Tri Nations Series	Australia	25	New Zealand	32	40,167
2	2 August 1997	1997 Tri Nations Series	Australia	32	South Africa	20	34,416
3	6 June 1998	1998 Cook Cup	Australia	76	England	0	26,691
4	8 August 2003	2003 Tri Nations Series	Australia	29	South Africa	9	51,188
5	26 June 2004	2004 Cook Cup	Australia	51	England	15	52,492
6	2 July 2005	2005 Trophée des Bicentenaires	Australia	37	France	31	50,826
7	15 July 2006	2006 Tri Nations Series	Australia	49	South Africa	0	41,578
8	29 July 2006	2006 Tri Nations Series / Bledisloe Cup	Australia	9	New Zealand	13	52,498
9	2 June 2007	2007 James Bevan Trophy	Australia	31	Wales	0	41,622
10	5 July 2008	2008 Trophée des Bicentenaires	Australia	40	France	10	49,542
11	13 September 2008	2008 Tri Nations Series / Bledisloe Cup	Australia	24	New Zealand	28	52,328
12	5 September 2009	2009 Tri Nations Series / Mandela Challenge Plate	Australia	21	South Africa	6	47,481
13	26 June 2010	2010 Lansdowne Cup	Australia	22	Ireland	15	45,498
14	24 July 2010	2010 Tri Nations Series / Mandela Challenge Plate	Australia	30	South Africa	13	44,284
15	27 August 2011	2011 Tri Nations Series / Bledisloe Cup	Australia	25	New Zealand	20	51,858
16	27 August 2011	2012 Bledisloe Cup	Australia	18	New Zealand	18	51,888
17	9 June 2012	2012 James Bevan Trophy	Australia	27	Wales	19	43,000
18	22 June 2013	2013 Tom Richards Trophy	Australia	21	British & Irish Lions	23	52,499
19	7 September 2013	2013 Rugby Championship / Mandela Challenge Plate	Australia	12	South Africa	38	43,715
20	7 June 2014	2014 Trophée des Bicentenaires	Australia	50	France	23	33,718
21	18 October 2014	2014 Bledisloe Cup	Australia	28	New Zealand	29	45,186
22	18 July 2015	2015 Rugby Championship / Mandela Challenge Plate	Australia	24	South Africa	20	37,633
23	11 June 2016	2016 Cook Cup	Australia	28	England	39	48,735
24	10 September 2016	2016 Rugby Championship / Mandela Challenge Plate	Australia	23	South Africa	17	30,327
25	24 June 2017	2017 Italy Tour	Australia	40	Italy	27	21,849
26	21 October 2017	2017 Bledisloe Cup	Australia	23	New Zealand	18	45,107
27	9 June 2018	2018 Ireland rugby union tour of Australia	Australia	18	Ireland	9	46,273
28	27 July 2019	2019 Rugby Championship	Australia	16	Argentina	10	31,599
29	7 November 2020	2020 Tri Nations Series	Australia	24	New Zealand	22	36,000
30	7 July 2021	2021 France rugby union tour of Australia	Australia	23	France	21	17,890
31	17 July 2021	2021 France rugby union tour of Australia	Australia	33	France	30	34,170
32	18 September 2021	2021 Rugby Championship / Mandela Challenge Plate	Australia	30	South Africa	17	40,789
33	18 September 2021	2021 Rugby Championship	Argentina	13	New Zealand	36	38,215
34	9 July 2022	2022 Ella–Mobbs Trophy	Australia	17	England	25	46,536
35	10 August 2024	2024 Rugby Championship / Mandela Challenge Plate	Australia	7	South Africa	33	52,019
36	19 July 2025	2025 Lions Series Trophy	Australia	19	British & Irish Lions	27	52,229

=== Men's soccer internationals ===
Game #	Date	Competition	Home team	Result	Away team	Attendance
1	11 November 1971	Friendly	Australia	2–2	Israel	5,040
2	15 June 1983	Friendly	Australia	0–0	England	16,000
3	27 September 1985	Friendly	Australia	3–0	China	4,823
4	8 February 1995	Friendly	Australia	0–0	Colombia	13,212
5	25 February 1996	Friendly	Australia	0–2	Sweden	10,081
6	21 January 1997	Friendly	New Zealand	0–3	Norway	15,161
7	21 January 1997	Friendly	Australia	2–1	South Korea	15,161
8	25 September 1998	OFC Nations Cup 1998 Group A	New Zealand	0–1	Tahiti	900
9	25 September 1998	OFC Nations Cup 1998 Group B	Australia	3–0	Fiji	900
10	28 September 1998	OFC Nations Cup 1998 Group A	New Zealand	8–1	Vanuatu	500
11	28 September 1998	OFC Nations Cup 1998 Group B	Australia	16–0	Cook Islands	600
12	30 September 1998	OFC Nations Cup 1998 Group A	Tahiti	5–1	Vanuatu	400
13	30 September 1998	OFC Nations Cup 1998 Group B	Fiji	3–0	Cook Islands	500
14	2 October 1998	OFC Nations Cup 1998 Semi Final	New Zealand	1–0	Fiji	1200
15	2 October 1998	OFC Nations Cup 1998 Semi Final	Australia	4–2	Tahiti	1200
16	4 October 1998	OFC Nations Cup 1998 Third-place playoff	Fiji	1–0	Tahiti	2000
17	4 October 1998	OFC Nations Cup 1998 Final	Australia	0–1	New Zealand	12,000
18	7 October 2006	Friendly	Australia	1–1	Paraguay	47,609
19	1 June 2008	2010 FIFA World Cup qualifier	Australia	1–0	Iraq	48,678
20	15 October 2008	2010 FIFA World Cup qualifier	Australia	4–0	Qatar	34,230
21	3 March 2010	2011 AFC Asian Cup qualifier	Australia	1–0	Indonesia	20,422
22	2 September 2011	2014 FIFA World Cup qualifier	Australia	2–1	Thailand	24,540
23	12 June 2012	2014 FIFA World Cup qualifier	Australia	1–1	Japan	40,189
24	17 November 2018	Friendly	Australia	1–1	South Korea	32,922
25	22 September 2022	Friendly	Australia	1–0	New Zealand	25,392
26	29 September 2026	Friendly	Australia	2–4	Brazil	52,423

=== Women's soccer internationals ===
Game #	Date	Competition	Home team	Result	Away team	Attendance
1	3 March 2019	Friendly	Argentina	0–2	New Zealand	5716
2	3 March 2019	Friendly	Australia	4–1	South Korea	10,520
3	3 September 2022	Friendly	Australia	0–1	Canada	25,016
4	28 November 2024	Friendly	Australia	1–3	Brazil	47,501

=== Boxing ===
Suncorp Stadium was the host of the Manny Pacquiao vs. Jeff Horn fight for the WBO welterweight championship with 51,052 people in attendance.

== Controversies ==
On Thursday, 16 June 2011, The Weekend Australian revealed that Suncorp Stadium was in danger of either losing the hosting rights to all Queensland based NRL finals matches to Sydney, or having its capacity limited to 25,000 seats, due to a condition included in the legislation regarding the Stadium's redevelopment that only 24 'special events' (i.e. with attendance in excess of 25,000) a year can be hosted at the venue. This number of special events was reached when the Brisbane Broncos faced the Manly Warringah Sea Eagles in Round 26 of the 2011 NRL Telstra Premiership Season. On 6 September 2011, legislation was passed to lift the crowd capacity limit to 35,000 for those 24 events, enabling the Broncos to host finals matches should they progress that far.

The stadium's grass quality was criticised by coaches and players during the 2015 AFC Asian Cup.

== See also ==
- List of rugby league stadiums by capacity
- Lists of stadiums

Preceded by Old Trafford; 2000	Rugby League World Cup; Final venue 2008	Succeeded by Old Trafford; 2013
Preceded by Old Trafford; 2013	Rugby League World Cup; Final venue 2017	Succeeded by Old Trafford; 2021
Preceded by Old Trafford; 2021	Rugby League World Cup; Final venue 2026	Succeeded by TBA; 2030
