= Julia Louisa Lovejoy =

American abolitionist writer (1812-1882)

Julia Louise Lovejoy
- Born: March 9, 1812; Lebanon, New Hampshire
- Died: March 15, 1882 (aged 70); Palmyra, Kansas
- Resting place: Vinland Cemetery, Douglas County, Kansas

Julia Louisa Lovejoy (1812-1882) was an abolitionist writer. She was a correspondent during the Bleeding Kansas era.

Lovejoy was born in Lebanon, New Hampshire, in 1812. Her husband, Charles Haseltine Lovejoy, was a Methodist minister. She moved to Kansas in 1855 with her family as part of a group sent by the New England Emigrant Aid Company to work towards making it free from slavery.

Lovejoy began writing letters back to New Hampshire to the anti-slavery editor of the Independent Democrat in 1855 as her family began their journey west.

Lovejoy died on March 15, 1882, at the age of 70 in Palmyra, Kansas (now Baldwin City).
