= Australian Society for Sports History =

Australian Society for Sports History (ASSH) was formed in July 1983. The aim of the Society is to encourage discussion on the history of sport in Australia through research, publishing and events such as conferences and workshops.

== Background ==
The Society was formed during the Sporting Traditions VI Conference held at the Melbourne Cricket Ground in July 1983. The inaugural President was Colin Tatz.

=== Presidents ===
- 1985-1987 Colin Tatz
- 1987-1989 Ray Crawford/John O’Hara
- 1989-1991 Wray Vamplew
- 1991-1993 Richard Stremski
- 1993-1995 Ian Jobling
- 1995-1997 Bill Murray
- 1997-1999 Braham Dabscheck
- 1999-2001 Roy Hay
- 2001-2003 Richard Cashman
- 2003-2005 Richard Cashman/ J. Neville Turner
- 2005-2011 Tara Magdalinski
- 2011-2013 Rob Hess
- 2013-2015 Murray Phillips
- 2015-2017 Gary Osmond
- 2017-2019 Marie-Louise McDermott
- 2019-2021 Matthew Klugman
- 2021–present Jane Hunt

=== ASSH Fellows ===
The ASSH Fellowship is presented to members and non-members who have made an outstanding contribution to the field of sports history, either in Australia or internationally. It is presented in recognition of the leading role that the recipient has played in developing and furthering the research interests of sports history

- 1993 - Wray Vamplew
- 1995 - Richard Cashman
- 2003 - John O'Hara and Colin Tatz
- 2009 - Bill Murray
- 2017 - Rob Hess, Tara Magdalinski and Murray Phillips
- 2019 - Greg Ryan and Barbara Keys

== Sporting Traditions Conference ==
ASSH biennially hosts a national conference called Sporting Traditions. The first Conference in 1977 was organised by Richard Cashman and Michael McKernan to bring together academics with an interest in the history of sport. The conference proceedings were published in the bookSport in history : the making of modern sporting history. Many papers presented at the Conference are published in the Society's journal Sporting Traditions.

Number	Details (Host, Location and Dates)
I	University of New South Wales, Sydney, 28–30 June 1977
II	University of New South Wales, Sydney, 1–3 July 1979
III	La Trobe University, Melbourne, 1981
IV	Melbourne Cricket Club, Melbourne, July 1983
V	Flinders University, Adelaide, 14–16 July 1985
VI	Melbourne Cricket Ground, Melbourne, 18–22 May 1987
VII	White City Club, Sydney, 6–9 July 1989
VIII	Australian Institute of Sport, Canberra, 11–14 July 1991
IX	University of Tasmania, Launceston, 30 June–3 July 1993
X	University of Queensland, Brisbane, 26–30 June 1995
XI	Edith Cowan University, Perth, 1–4 July 1997
XII	University of Otago, Queenstown, New Zealand, 1–5 February 1999
XIII	Aquinas College, Adelaide, 10–13 July 2001
XIV	Australian Catholic University, Sydney, 3–7 July 2003
XV	Victoria University, Melbourne, 11–14 July 2005
XVI	University of Canberra, Canberra, 27–30 June 2007
XVII	University of Otago and the Otago Polytechnic, Wellington, New Zealand, 31 June-3 July 2009
XVIII	University of Queensland. Kingscliff, NSW, 5–8 July 2011
XIX	University of Canberra, Canberra, 2–5 July 2013
XX	Darwin, 30 June – 3 July 2015
XXI	University of Technology Sydney, Sydney, 3–6 July 2017
XXII	Charles Sturt University, Bathurst, 1–4 July 2019
XXIII	Deakin University, Geelong, 27 June-1 July 2022; Incorporated in Australian Historical Association National Conference
XXIV	Eastlake Football Club / National Library of Australia, Canberra, 10–13 July 2023

== Publications ==
=== Journals ===
The Society publishes two journals. Sporting Traditions is a biannual academic journal that has been published since November 1984. The inaugural editor was Wray Vamplew. It includes academic articles and book reviews. ASSH Bulletin is published on a regular basis and covers short articles and news.

=== ASSH Studies Papers ===
The Society publishes compilations of papers on a range of topics including specific sports, law, gender, Olympics and Indigenous Australians.

=== Oxford Companion to Australian Sport ===
The Society was responsible for creating the Oxford Companion to Australian Sport. Most members of the Society provided entries on all aspects of the history of sport in Australia. The first edition was published by Oxford University Press in 1992 and updated in 1994. Contributing editors were Wary Vamplew, Katharine Moore, John O'Hara, Richard Cashman and Ian Jobling.

== See also ==
- Tom Brock Lecture
