= Tom Brock Lecture =

Annual scholarly lecture

The Tom Brock Lecture is an annual scholarly lecture organised by the Australian Society for Sports History at the bequest of Australian sports historian Tom Brock. The topic of the lecture is the history of rugby league football. It has been given by leading writers and academics every year since 1999, at the New South Wales Rugby League's headquarters at Phillip Street in the Sydney CBD.

David Rowe, an academic, caused some controversy when he used his 2006 lecture to question football's prospects in the future following negative off-field media coverage. Shane Webcke was set to become the first player to give the lecture when he was invited to do so in 2007, but this did not eventuate.

In 2010, the Australian Society for Sports History and the Tom Brock Bequest Committee published Tales From Coathanger City: Ten Years of Tom Brock Lectures. The book includes the Tom Brock lectures delivered from 1999 to 2008, an essay considering 10 years of lectures and study of the game, a biography of Tom Brock and some information on the Bequest Committee.

== List of lectures ==
1. 29 September 1999 - Dr Andrew Moore: Jimmy Devereux's Yorkshire Pudding: Reflections on the origins of rugby league in New South Wales and Queensland
2. 30 November 2000 - Ian Heads: "Gang-gangs at one o'clock" … and Other Flights of Fancy; A Personal Journey through Rugby League
3. 20 September 2001 - Alex Buzo: Sydney: The Heart of Rugby League
4. 22 August 2002 - Alan Clarkson: The Changing Face of Rugby League
5. 4 July 2003 - Tony Collins: "Ahr Waggy": Harold Wagstaff and the making of Anglo-Australian rugby league culture
6. 22 September 2004 - Tom Keneally, AO: No more bloody bundles for Britain: The Post-World War II tours of the British and French Allies
7. 21 September 2005 - Roy Masters: The Great Fibro versus Silvertail Wars
8. 21 September 2006 - David Rowe: The Stuff of Dreams, or the Dream Stuffed? Rugby League, Media Empires, Sex Scandals, and Global Plays
9. 27 September 2007 - Sean Fagan: Nothing But a Nine-Day Wonder: The founding of rugby league—Australia’s first professional code
10. 6 November 2008 - Lex Marinos, OAM: From a Federation Game to a League of Nations
11. 23 September 2009 - Terry Williams: The Lost Tribes of League – the fate of axed and merged clubs and their fans
12. 23 September 2010 - John Fahey, AC: Tries and Tribulations
13. 15 September 2011 - Debbie Spillane 'The view from the ladies stand'
14. 6 September 2012 - David Hill: Can Rugby League Survive the Twenty-first Century?
15. 18 September 2013 - Frank Puletua: The Chocolate Soldiers – The emergence of western Sydney’s new league of players
16. 8 October 2014 - Tom Harms: People, Stories and Meaning in Rugby League
17. 16 September 2015 - Ross McMullin: Retrieving Ted Larkin (1880 – 1915): Outstanding Footballer, Acclaimed Organiser, Original ANZAC
18. 20 September 2016 - Dean Widders: My Game, My People
19. 5 July 2017 - Raelene Castle ONZM: Leadership insights from the National Rugby League and Australasian Sport
20. 19 September 2018 - A panel discussion featuring Roy Masters, Tracey Holmes and Brian Canavan" How has rugby league progressed in the past 20 years?
21. 24 September 2019 - Braham Dabscheck ‘Big Artie’s Most Important Offload; Forty Years of the Rugby League Players’ Association’
