= George A. Lovejoy (New Hampshire politician) =

American politician

George Lovejoy

Member of the New Hampshire Senate
- In office 1992–1996

Personal details
- Born: May 24, 1931 Portland, Oregon, U.S.
- Died: February 5, 2015 (aged 83) Barrington, New Hampshire, U.S.
- Party: Republican

Military service
- Branch/service: United States Navy
- Unit: United States Navy Reserve
- Battles/wars: Korean War

George A. Lovejoy (May 24, 1931 – February 5, 2015) was an American politician and businessman.

== Early life ==
Born in Portland, Oregon, Lovejoy graduated from Spaulding High School in Rochester, New Hampshire.

== Career ==
Lovejoy served as a cook in the United States Navy during the Korean War and remained in the United States Navy Reserve for six years. Outside of politics, Lovejoy worked in real estate business in Rochester. During the 1970s, Lovejoy served as director of the New Hampshire Office of Comprehensive Planning under Governor Meldrim Thomson Jr. From 1992 to 1996, he served as a member of the New Hampshire Senate as a Republican.
