= George A. Lovejoy (Washington politician) =

American politician

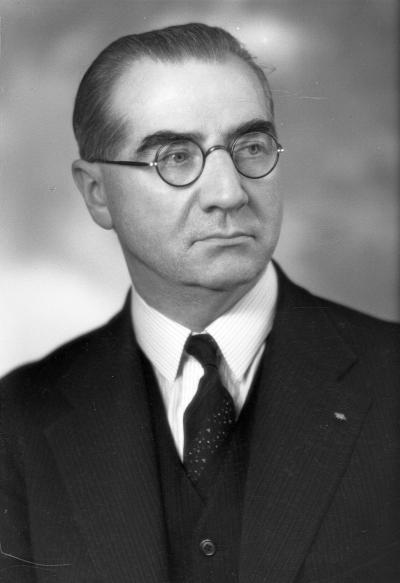
- Lovejoy in 1933

Member of the Washington Senate from the 36th district
- In office January 9, 1933 – January 11, 1943
- Preceded by: Fred W. Hastings
- Succeeded by: Victor Zednick

Personal details
- Born: July 30, 1879 Central City, Nebraska, U.S.
- Died: March 2, 1944 (aged 64) Seattle, Washington, U.S.
- Party: Democratic

George A. Lovejoy (July 30, 1879 – March 2, 1944) was an American politician in the state of Washington. He served in the Washington State Senate from 1933 to 1943. From 1941 to 1943, he was President pro tempore of the Senate.
