= 2021 All Stars match =

Australian rugby league match

The 2021 All Stars match was the tenth annual representative exhibition All Stars match of Australian rugby league. The match was played between the Indigenous All Stars and the Māori All Stars at Townsville, Queensland's Queensland Country Bank Stadium on 20 February 2021. As of 2026, this was the last time since the introduction of the All Stars concept that the teams were selected through public voting.

== Men's All Stars match ==
2021 All Stars match
Indigenous All Stars	Māori All Stars
10	10
	1	2	3	4	Total
IND	2	0	0	8	10
MĀO	0	0	10	0	10
- Date: 20 February 2021
- Stadium: Queensland Country Bank Stadium
- Location: Townsville, Queensland
- Preston Campbell Medal: James Fisher-Harris
- Referee: Adam Gee
- Attendance: 20,206

Broadcast partners
- Broadcasters: Nine Network Fox League
- Commentators: Mat Thompson; Andrew Johns; Billy Slater

=== Teams ===
INDIGENOUS ALL STARS	Position	MĀORI ALL STARS
Latrell Mitchell	Fullback	Charnze Nicoll-Klokstad
Blake Ferguson	Wing	Dallin Watene-Zelezniak (c)
Jack Wighton	Centre	Joseph Manu
Jesse Ramien	Centre	Dylan Walker
Alex Johnston^{3}	Wing	Patrick Herbert^{4}
Cody Walker (c)	Five-eighth	Jarome Luai
Jamal Fogarty	Halfback	Benji Marshall^{5}
Andrew Fifita	Prop	Russell Packer^{6}
Reuben Cotter	Hooker	Jeremy Marshall-King^{7}
Josh Kerr	Prop	James Fisher-Harris
David Fifita	2nd Row	Briton Nikora
Tyrell Fuimaono^{1}	2nd Row	Jordan Riki^{8}
Tyrone Peachey	Lock	Joseph Tapine (c)
Corey Thompson	Interchange	Issac Luke
Jamayne Taunoa-Brown	Interchange	Emry Pere^{9}
Cade Cust	Interchange	Zane Musgrove^{2}
Chris Smith	Interchange	Jackson Topine
Zac Saddler	Interchange	Esan Marsters
Joshua Curran	Interchange	Daejarn Asi
Brian Kelly	Interchange	Wiremu Greig^{10}
Laurie Daley	Coach	David Kidwell

^{1} - Wade Graham was originally selected to play but withdrew due to injury. Tyrell Fuimaono was moved from the bench to second row and Graham was replaced by Zac Saddler.
^{2} - Kevin Proctor was originally selected to play but withdrew due to injury. He was replaced by Zane Musgrove.
^{3} - Josh Addo-Carr was originally selected to play but withdrew due to a Victoria COVID-19 border closure. Alex Johnston was moved from the bench to wing and Addo-Carr was replaced by Corey Thompson.
^{4} - Reimis Smith was originally selected to play but withdrew due to a Victoria COVID-19 border closure. Patrick Herbert was moved from the bench to wing and Reimis Smith was replaced by Esan Marsters.
^{5} - Jahrome Hughes was originally selected to play but withdrew due to a Victoria COVID-19 border closure. Benji Marshall was moved from the bench to halfback and Hughes was replaced by Daejarn Asi.
^{6} - Jesse Bromwich was originally selected to play but withdrew due to a Victoria COVID-19 border closure. He was replaced by Russell Packer.
^{7} - Brandon Smith was originally selected to play but withdrew due to a Victoria COVID-19 border closure. Jeremy Marshall-King was moved from the bench to hooker and Brandon Smith was replaced by Issac Luke.
^{8} - Kenny Bromwich was originally selected to play but withdrew due to a Victoria COVID-19 border closure. Jordan Riki was moved from the bench to second row and Kenny Bromwich was replaced by Jackson Topine.
^{9} - Nelson Asofa-Solomona was originally selected to play but withdrew due to a Victoria COVID-19 border closure. He was replaced by Emry Pere.
^{10} - Bailey Simonsson was originally selected to play but withdrew due to injury. He was replaced by Wiremu Greig.

=== Result ===
20 February 2021
7:15pm (AEST)

Indigenous All Stars	10 – 10	(Māori people) Māori All Stars
Tries: Alex Johnston (64') 1 Goals: Latrell Mitchell 2/2 (65', 80' pen); Jamal Fogarty 1/1 (20' pen); Sin Bin: Tyrone Peachey (60') 1	1st: 2 - 0; 2nd: 0 - 0; 3rd: 0 - 10; 4th: 8 - 0	Tries: Jordan Riki (49') 1 Dallin Watene-Zelezniak (53') 1 Goals: Patrick Herbert 1/2 (51'); Sin Bin: Zane Musgrove (35') 1

Queensland Country Bank Stadium
Attendance: 20,206
Preston Campbell Medal: James Fisher-Harris
Referee: Adam Gee

== Women's All Stars match ==
2021 All Stars match
Indigenous All Stars	Māori All Stars
0	24
	1	2	3	4	Total
IND	0	0	0	0	0
MĀO	12	4	8	0	24
- Date: 20 February 2021
- Stadium: Queensland Country Bank Stadium
- Location: Townsville, Queensland
- Player of the Match: Raecene McGregor
- Referee: Belinda Sharpe

Broadcast partners
- Broadcasters: Nine Network Fox League

For the ninth time, a Women's All Stars match will be held on 20 February 2021.

=== Teams ===
INDIGENOUS ALL STARS	Position	MĀORI ALL STARS
Jaime Chapman	Fullback	Botille Vette-Welsh
Taleena Simon	Wing	Zali Fay
Monique Donovan	Centre	Corban McGregor (c)
Jasmine Peters	Centre	Amy Turner
Leticia Quinlan	Wing	Shanice Parker
Tahlia Fuimaono	Five-eighth	Racene McGregor
Akira Kelly	Halfback	Zahara Temara
Kaitlyn Phillips	Prop	Rona Peters
Quincy Dodd	Hooker	Nita Maynard
Caitlan Johnston	Prop	Shannon Mato
Shaniah Power	2nd Row	Kennedy Cherrington
Shaylee Bent	2nd Row	Crystal Tamarua
Tallisha Harden (c)	Lock	Hayley Tipene
Lailee Phillips	Interchange	Jodeci Nicholson
Keilee Joseph	Interchange	Mya Hill-Moana
Olivia Kernick	Interchange	Roxy Murdoch
Abelee Stanley	Interchange	Hayley Tipene
Ngalika Barker	Interchange	Page McGregor
Ian Bourke	Coach	Keith Hanley

=== Result ===
20 February 2021
4:40pm (AEST)

Indigenous All Stars	0 – 24	(Māori people) Māori All Stars
Tries: Goals:	1st: 0 – 12; 2nd: 0 – 4; 3rd: 0 – 8; 4th: 0 – 0	Tries: Raecene McGregor (2', 44') 2 Amy Turner (9') 1 Shanice Parker (38') 1 Page McGregor (44') 1 Goals: Zahara Temara 2/5 (4', 11')

Queensland Country Bank Stadium
Attendance:
Player of the Match: Raecene McGregor
Referee: Belinda Sharpe
