= 2027 Six Nations Under 20s Championship =

Under-20 rugby union competition

- Date: 5 February – 12 March 2027
- Countries: England; France; Ireland; Italy; Scotland; Wales

Tournament statistics
- Matches played: 15
- Official website: sixnationsrugby.com

The 2027 Six Nations Under 20s Championship is the 20th Six Nations Under 20s Championship, an annual northern hemisphere rugby union tournament contested by the under-20 men's national teams of England, France, Ireland, Italy, Scotland and Wales. France were the reigning grand slam champions, having won their fifth title in 2026.

== Table ==
Pos	Team	Pld	W	D	L	PF	PA	PD	TF	TA	TB	LB	Pts
1	England	0	0	0	0	0	0	0	0	0	0	0	0
2	France	0	0	0	0	0	0	0	0	0	0	0	0
3	Ireland	0	0	0	0	0	0	0	0	0	0	0	0
4	Italy	0	0	0	0	0	0	0	0	0	0	0	0
5	Scotland	0	0	0	0	0	0	0	0	0	0	0	0
6	Wales	0	0	0	0	0	0	0	0	0	0	0	0

Updated to match(es) played on unknown. Source: Six Nations Rugby

Table ranking rules:

- Four match points are awarded for a win.
- Two match points are awarded for a draw.
- A bonus match point is awarded to a team that scores four or more tries in a match or loses a match by seven points or fewer. If a team scores four tries in a match and loses by seven points or fewer, they are awarded both bonus points.
- Three bonus match points are awarded to a team that wins all five of their matches (known as a Grand Slam). This ensures that a Grand Slam winning team reaches a minimum of 23 points, and thus always ranks over a team who won four matches in which they also were awarded four try bonus points and were also awarded two bonus points (a try bonus and a losing bonus) in the match that they lost for a total of 22 points.
- Tie-breakers
  - If two or more teams are tied on match points, the team with the better points difference (points scored less points conceded) is ranked higher.
  - If the above tie-breaker fails to separate tied teams, the team that scored the higher number of total tries in their matches is ranked higher.
  - If two or more teams remain tied for first place at the end of the championship after applying the above tiebreakers, the title is shared between them.

== Fixtures ==
The fixtures for the tournament were announced on 15 October 2025.

=== Week 1 ===
5 February 2027
18:10

Ireland	v	England

Musgrave Park, Cork

5 February 2027
18:10

France	v	Wales

Stade Maurice David, Provence

5 February 2027
19:45

Scotland	v	Italy

The Hive, Edinburgh

=== Week 2 ===
12 February 2027
19:15

Scotland	v	Wales

The Hive, Edinburgh

12 February 2027
19:45

Italy	v	Ireland

Stadio Comunale di Monigo, Treviso

12 February 2027
20:00

England	v	France

Welford Road, Leicester

=== Week 3 ===
19 February 2027
19:15

England	v	Italy

York Community Stadium, York

19 February 2027
19:45

Wales	v	Ireland

Cardiff Arms Park, Cardiff

19 February 2027
20:00

France	v	Scotland

Stade Marcel-Deflandre, La Rochelle

=== Week 4 ===
4 March 2027
19:15

Scotland	v	Ireland

The Hive, Edinburgh

5 March 2027
18:10

Italy	v	France

Stadio Comunale di Monigo, Treviso

5 March 2027
18:45

Wales	v	England

Cardiff Arms Park, Cardiff

=== Week 5 ===
12 March 2027
19:15

Italy	v	Wales

Stadio Comunale di Monigo, Treviso

12 March 2027
19:45

England	v	Scotland

The Recreation Ground, Bath

12 March 2027
20:00

Ireland	v	France

Musgrave Park, Cork

== See also ==
- 2027 Six Nations Championship
- 2027 Women's Six Nations Championship
- 2027 Six Nations Women's U21 Series
