= Joey Carbery =

Ireland international rugby union player (born 1995)

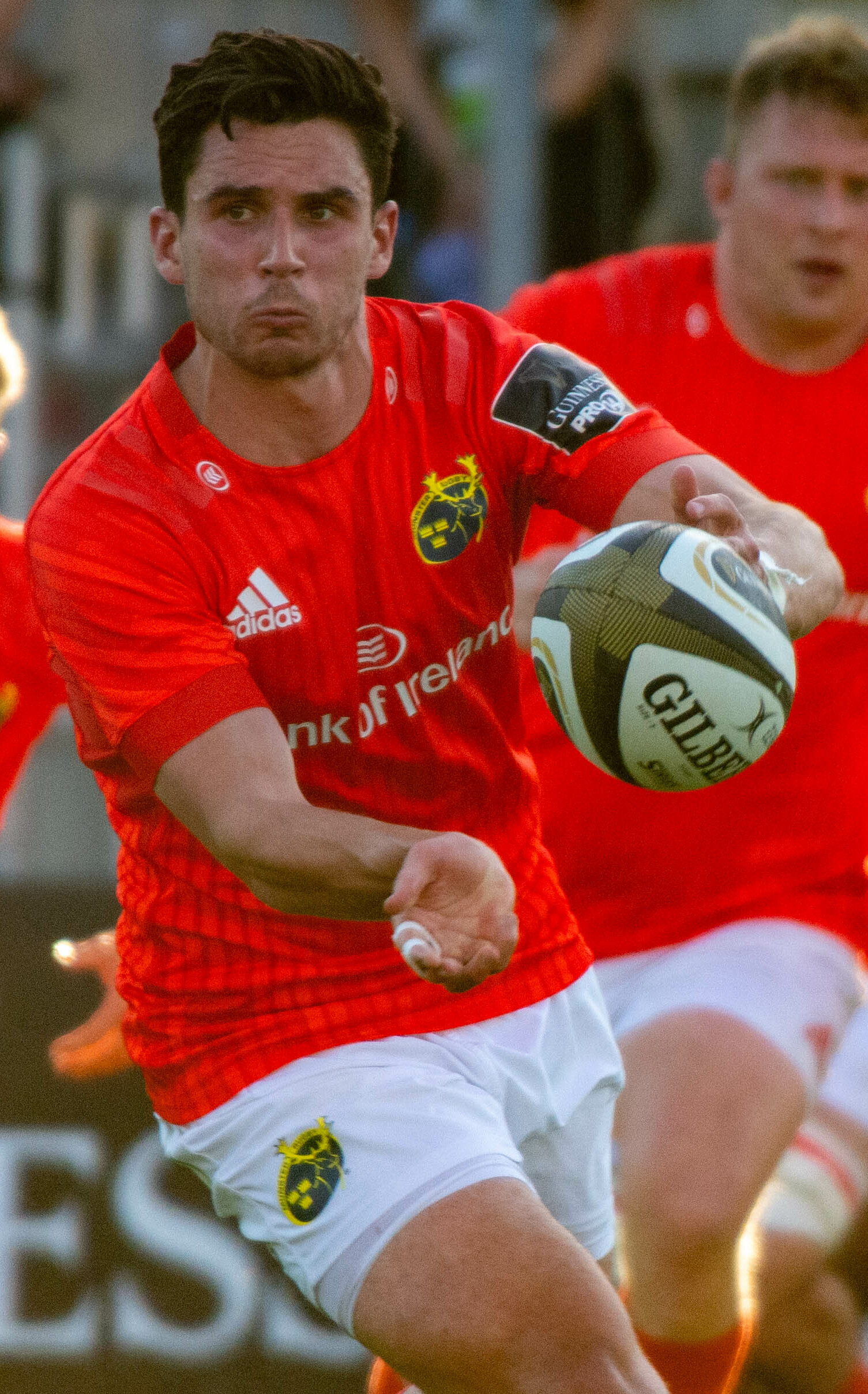
- Carbery representing Munster during the Pro14 Rainbow Cup in 2021
- Born: 1 November 1995 (age 31) Auckland, New Zealand
- Height: 1.83 m (6 ft 0 in)
- Weight: 86 kg (13.5 st; 190 lb)
- School: Árdscoil na Tríonóide; Blackrock College
- University: University College Dublin

Rugby union career
- Position(s): Fly-half, Fullback
Amateur team(s)
| Years | Team | Apps | (Points) |
| 2014–2015 | UCD | | |
| 2015– | Clontarf | | |
Senior career
| Years | Team | Apps | (Points) |
| 2016–2018 | Leinster | 37 | (101) |
| 2018–2024 | Munster | 68 | (517) |
| 2024–2026 | Bordeaux Bègles | 34 | (122) |
| 2026– | Leinster | 0 | (0) |
- Correct as of 06 April 2025
International career
| Years | Team | Apps | (Points) |
| 2015 | Ireland U20 | 27 | (33) |
| 2016–2022 | Ireland | 37 | (164) |
- Correct as of 12 November 2022

Joseph Carbery (born 1 November 1995) is an Irish rugby union player who plays as a fullback or a fly-half for United Rugby Championship club Leinster Rugby. Born in New Zealand to Irish parents, he represents Ireland at international level.

== Early life ==
Carbery was born in Dargaville, New Zealand, to an Irish mother from Athy, County Kildare and an Irish–New Zealand father (who was also born in Athy but taken by his migrating parents as a two-year-old to live in New Zealand). Carbery returned with his family to Athy when he was 11 years old. He attended Árdscoil na Tríonóide in Athy, and moved to Blackrock College for his final year of school, where he won the 2014 Leinster Schools Rugby Senior Cup.

== Club career ==
=== Leinster ===
Carbery made his senior competitive debut for Leinster on 18 March 2016, when he came off the bench in the province's 12–6 defeat during the 2015–16 Pro12 season at the hands of Glasgow Warriors. He made his break-through for Leinster when he started at fly-half in the provinces opening 2016–17 Pro12 fixture against Benetton on 2 September 2016. Carbery scored two tries in their 20–8 victory against the Italian side.

Carbery produced a Man-of-the-Match performance from fullback in Leinster's 32–17 win against Wasps in the quarter-finals of the 2016–17 European Rugby Champions Cup on 1 April 2017. He went on to win the Young Player of the Season award for both Leinster and the Pro12 for the 2016–17 season. He was used as a replacement by Leinster in the finals of both the 2017–18 Pro14 and 2017–18 European Rugby Champions Cup in May 2018. Leinster's victories in both finals saw them complete a historic double, becoming the first Celtic team to do so.

=== Munster ===
After much speculation, it was confirmed in May 2018 that Carbery would join Leinster's rivals Munster on a two-year contract ahead of the 2018–19 season. He made his competitive debut for Munster on 1 September 2018, coming off the bench in their opening 2018–19 Pro14 fixture against the Cheetahs in Thomond Park, a game which Munster won 38–0. Carbery made his first start for Munster on 14 September 2018, doing so against Ospreys in Irish Independent Park and scoring his first try for the province, as well as kicking five conversions in Munster's 49–13 win.

Carbery won the Man-of-the-Match award and scored 18 points, including a try, in Munster's 64–7 win against Ulster in Thomond Park on 29 September 2018. Carbery's try in this match was later voted Munster's try of the 2018–19 season. Carbery made his European debut for Munster on 13 October 2018, starting in the provinces 10–10 draw with Exeter Chiefs in Sandy Park and contributing five points off the kicking tee in the sides' opening 2018–19 Champions Cup fixture. One week later, in his first home European game for Munster, Carbery scored one try, four conversions, one penalty and won the Man-of-the-Match award in the provinces 36–22 win against Gloucester.

Carbery scored 14 points, including four penalties and one conversion, in Munster's 26–17 win against his former province Leinster on 29 December 2018. He was Man-of-the-Match and scored 16 points, including one try, four conversions and one penalty, in Munster's 31–24 away win against Connacht on 5 January 2019. Carbery scored 26 points, including two tries, five conversions and two penalties, and was Man-of-the-Match in Munster's 41–15 away win against English side Gloucester in round 5 of the Champions Cup on 11 January 2019. He scored all of Munster's points from penalties in their 9–7 win against Exeter Chiefs in round 6 on the Champions Cup on 19 January 2019, a result that ensured Munster advanced to a record 18th Champions Cup quarter-final.

Carbery signed a two-year contract extension with Munster in March 2019. The ankle injury Carbery sustained whilst on international duty with Ireland at the 2019 Rugby World Cup was aggravated post-tournament, ruling him out for a number of games. He made his return from injury for the province on 28 December 2019, featuring off the bench in Munster's 13–6 defeat against Carbery's former club Leinster in round 9 of the 2019–20 Pro14. However, a wrist injury sustained after Carbery played the full 80 minutes in Munster's 38–17 defeat against Ulster on 3 January 2020 required surgery, and during his rehabilitation for that injury, it was decided that Carbery would also undergo surgery for the ankle injury sustained while on international duty during the world cup, ruling him out for the remainder of the 2019–20 season and indefinitely thereafter.

Carbery made his long-awaited return from injury on 26 February 2021, thirteen months after his last appearance for the province. He came on as a replacement for Rory Scannell in the 63rd minute of Munster's 20–11 away win against Cardiff Blues in round 13 of the 2020–21 Pro14, converting Niall Scannell's 77th minute try to secure the victory. In his first start since returning from injury, against Scarlets on 12 March 2021, Carbery converted all four of Munster's tries and earned the Man-of-the-Match award in their 28–10 win against the Welsh side.

In a further injury blow, Carbery suffered a fractured elbow in the final minutes of Munster opening 2021–22 Champions Cup fixture away to Wasps on 12 December 2021, which required surgery. He signed a two-year contract extension with Munster in January 2022.

Having missed the first leg of Munster's 2021–22 Champions Cup round of 16 fixture away to English club Exeter Chiefs due to injury, which the hosts won 13–8, Carbery returned for the second leg one week later on 16 April 2022 to score 21 points, including a try, two conversions and four penalties for a 100% return off the kicking tee, in the province's 26–10 home win, which secured a 34–23 aggregate win and a record-extending 19th Champions Cup quarter-final for Munster. Carbery earned his 50th cap for Munster when he started in their 40–30 away win against Italian side Benetton in round 13 of the 2022–23 United Rugby Championship on 28 January 2023. Injuries and the emergence of Jack Crowley left relatively few opportunities for Carbery in the 2023-4 season and he was released in the summer of 2024.

=== Bordeaux ===
In July 2024, Carbery moved, with his family to follow once a passport was sorted for his son, to begin a new contract with Bordeaux Bègles.

== International career ==
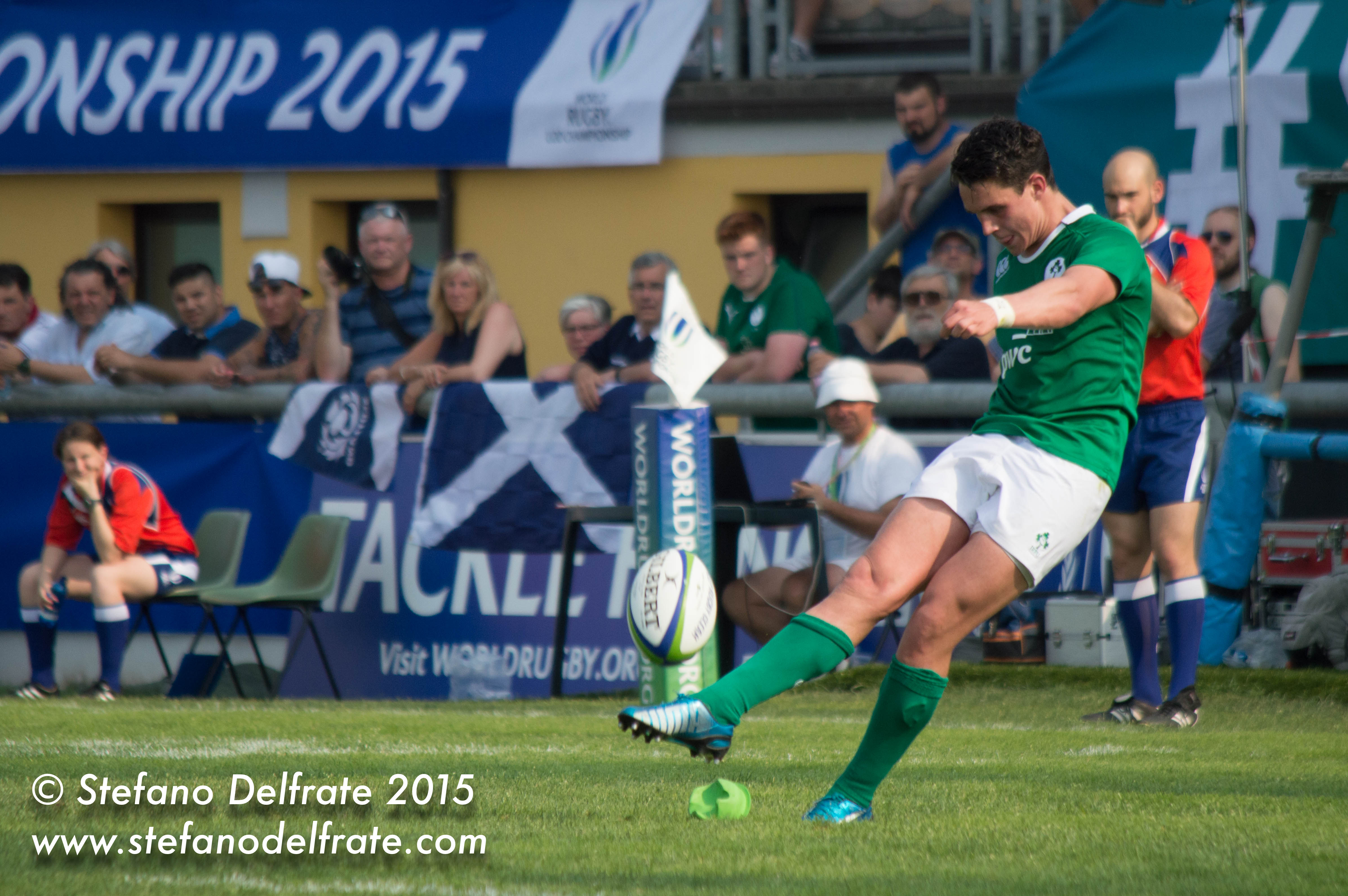
Carbery playing for Ireland at the 2015 World Rugby under-20 Championship

Carbery was selected in the Ireland national squad to play New Zealand in November 2016 at Soldier Field, Chicago. He was brought on as a substitute in the 59th minute, earning his first Ireland cap in their 40–29 victory, Ireland's first ever win against the All Blacks. He was a member of the Ireland team that won a Grand Slam in the 2018 Six Nations Championship. He started in the first test, whilst also featuring off the bench in the second, in Ireland's historic 2–1 series victory against Australia in June 2018. Carbery started in Ireland's wins against Italy and the United States, whilst also featuring off the bench in the wins against Argentina and New Zealand, during the 2018 Autumn Tests.

Carbery made two appearances for Ireland during the 2019 Six Nations Championship, featuring off the bench in their opening 32–20 defeat against England on 2 February, before coming on during the first-half to replace the injured Johnny Sexton to play a key role in Ireland's 22–13 win against Scotland one week later, though a hamstring injury and the form of Connacht's Jack Carty prevented Carbery from gaining further playing time during the tournament.

Carbery was selected in the 31-man Ireland squad for the 2019 Rugby World Cup, having featured in the warm-up match against Italy, though an ankle injury prevented Carbery from taking any further part in the warm-up matches. He returned from the injury to make his Rugby World Cup debut off the bench in Ireland's shock 19–12 defeat against hosts Japan on 28 September 2019, before providing scrum-half cover from the bench in the 35–0 win against Russia, and featuring off the bench in the 47–5 win against Samoa and the 46–14 quarter-final defeat against New Zealand. A wrist injury sustained whilst on provincial duty with Munster ruled Carbery out of the 2020 Six Nations Championship, and surgery for the ankle injury he sustained during the world cup ruled him out of the tour of Australia in July 2020.

Carbery made his long-awaited international return in Ireland's mid-year test against Japan on 3 July 2021, starting for his country for the first time in 23 months and scoring 14 points of the kicking tee in their 39–31 win. During the 2021 Autumn Nations Series, Carbery featured as a replacement in Ireland's 60–5 win against Japan on 6 November, and in the famous 29–20 win against New Zealand on 13 November, replacing injured captain Johnny Sexton and scoring three crucial penalties to seal the victory for Ireland. After Sexton was ruled out by injury, Carbery started in Ireland's final fixture of the series against Argentina on 21 November, scoring six conversions and two penalties for a personal haul of 18 points in a player of the match performance that guided Ireland to a 53–7 win.

Carbery recovered from an elbow injury sustained whilst on Champions Cup duty with Munster in December 2021 in time to be selected in the squad for the 2022 Six Nations Championship and declared fit for Ireland's opening fixture against Wales, and featured as a replacement in the 29–7 win against Wales in their opening fixture of the tournament on 5 February. Following a hamstring injury to captain and first-choice fly-half Johnny Sexton, Carbery started in Ireland's 30–24 away defeat against France on 12 February, scoring three conversions and one penalty for a haul of nine points in a good personal performance. Carbery was retained as Ireland's starting fly-half in their 57–6 home win against Italy on 27 February, scoring a try and two conversion before being replaced by a fit-again Jonathan Sexton in the second-half. Carbery returned to the replacements for the 32–15 away win against England on 12 March, replacing Jonathan Sexton late in the second-half, and for the 26–5 home win against Scotland on 19 March, a victory that secured the Triple Crown for Ireland.

Carbery was selected in the squad for the 2022 Ireland rugby union tour of New Zealand, and featured off the bench in the uncapped match against the Māori All Blacks on 29 June, which ended in a 32–17 defeat for Ireland, before also featuring off the bench in the first test against New Zealand on 2 July, replacing captain Johnny Sexton during the first-half after Sexton failed a head injury assessment, and scoring two conversions in Ireland's 42–19 defeat. Carbery also featured off the bench in Ireland's historic 23–12 win in the second test on 9 July, in what was Ireland's first ever away win against New Zealand, before also featuring off the bench in the second uncapped match against the Māori All Blacks on 12 July, which Ireland won 30–24 to draw the series 1–1, and in the 32–22 third test win against New Zealand on 16 July that secured Ireland's historic first ever series win in New Zealand.

During the 2022 Autumn Nations Series, Carbery was used as a replacement for Ireland in their 19–16 win against world champions South Africa on 5 November, before starting and scoring three conversions in Ireland's 35–17 win against Fiji on 12 November, though Carbery left the field with a head injury early in the second-half, which meant he missed Ireland's final fixture of the series against Australia.

Carbery was dropped from the Ireland squad ahead of the 2023 Six Nations, but was recalled ahead of the round three fixture against Italy as injury cover for Johnny Sexton, who was recovering from an injury.

== Statistics ==
=== International analysis by opposition ===
| Against | Played | Won | Lost | Drawn | Tries | Cons | Pens | Drops | Points | % Won |
|---|---|---|---|---|---|---|---|---|---|---|
| Argentina | 2 | 2 | 0 | 0 | 0 | 6 | 2 | 0 | 18 | 100 |
| Australia | 3 | 2 | 1 | 0 | 0 | 0 | 3 | 0 | 9 | 66.67 |
| Canada | 1 | 1 | 0 | 0 | 0 | 0 | 0 | 0 | 0 | 100 |
| England | 3 | 2 | 1 | 0 | 0 | 1 | 0 | 0 | 2 | 66.67 |
| Fiji | 2 | 2 | 0 | 0 | 0 | 4 | 0 | 0 | 8 | 100 |
| France | 1 | 0 | 1 | 0 | 0 | 3 | 1 | 0 | 9 | 0 |
| Italy | 4 | 4 | 0 | 0 | 2 | 12 | 0 | 0 | 34 | 100 |
| Japan | 3 | 2 | 1 | 0 | 0 | 6 | 2 | 0 | 18 | 66.67 |
| New Zealand | 7 | 5 | 2 | 0 | 0 | 4 | 3 | 0 | 17 | 71.43 |
| Samoa | 1 | 1 | 0 | 0 | 0 | 2 | 0 | 0 | 4 | 100 |
| Scotland | 3 | 3 | 0 | 0 | 0 | 1 | 1 | 0 | 5 | 100 |
| South Africa | 2 | 2 | 0 | 0 | 0 | 2 | 0 | 0 | 4 | 100 |
| United States | 3 | 3 | 0 | 0 | 0 | 14 | 2 | 0 | 34 | 100 |
| Wales | 2 | 2 | 0 | 0 | 0 | 1 | 0 | 0 | 2 | 100 |
| Total | 37 | 31 | 6 | 0 | 2 | 56 | 14 | 0 | 164 | 83.78 |

Correct as of 12 November 2022

== Honours ==
=== Blackrock College ===
- Leinster Schools Rugby Senior Cup:
  - Winner (1): 2014

=== Clontarf FC ===
- All-Ireland League Division 1A:
  - Winner (1): 2015–16

=== Leinster ===
- European Rugby Champions Cup:
  - Winner (1): 2017–18
- United Rugby Championship:
  - Winner (1): 2017–18

=== Munster ===
- United Rugby Championship
  - Winner (1): 2022–23

=== Bordeaux Bègles ===
- European Rugby Champions Cup:
  - Winner (2): 2024–25, 2025–26

=== Ireland ===
- Six Nations Championship:
  - Winner (1): 2018
- Grand Slam:
  - Winner (1): 2018
- Triple Crown:
  - Winner (2): 2018, 2022

=== Individual ===
- Pro14 Young Player of the Year:
  - Winner (1): 2016–17
- Leinster Young Player of the Year:
  - Winner (1): 2016–17
