= 2027 men's rugby union internationals =

The 2027 men's international rugby union calendar is highlighted by the 2027 Rugby World Cup, the 11th edition of the quadrennial world championship. Throughout the year, international matches will be played outside organised events such as the Six Nations Championship, and the Rugby Championship. The most significant matches outside of the Rugby World Cup will take place in the warm-up Tests, with England hosting Six Nations rivals France, Ireland and Italy at Twickenham Stadium.

== February ==
=== 12 February ===
12 February 2027
TBC

Ireland XV	v	Chile

Queen's University Stadium, Belfast

=== 20 February ===
20 February 2027
19:00 GMT (UTC+0)

England A	v	Ireland XV

Sandy Park, Exeter

=== 26 February ===
26 February 2027
19:45 GMT (UTC+0)

England A	v	Chile

Kingsholm Stadium, Kingsholm

== April ==
=== 25 April ===
25 April 2027
TBD AEST (UTC+10)

Australia	v	New Zealand

Lang Park, Brisbane

== See also ==
- 2027 Rugby World Cup
- 2027 Rugby World Cup warm-up matches
