= 2027 Rugby Championship =

Rugby Championship season

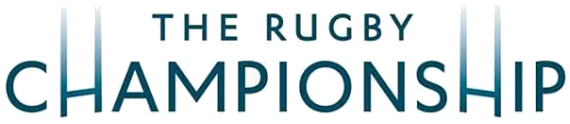
- Date: 10 July – August 2027 (Note: Specific dates yet to be confirmed.)
- Countries: Argentina; Australia; New Zealand; South Africa

Tournament statistics
- Matches played: 12

The 2027 Rugby Championship is the scheduled fourteenth edition of the annual southern hemisphere competition, involving Argentina, Australia, New Zealand and South Africa. The 2027 Rugby Championship marks the first edition of the tournament to be contested in full during the same year as a Rugby World Cup.

South Africa are the defending champions, having won the title in 2024 and 2025, respectively.

== Background ==
During the 2022 to 2024 negotiations between New Zealand Rugby (NZR) and the South African Rugby Union (SARU) for full traditional tours in 2026 and 2030, SARU chief executive Rian Oberholzer stated that although the Rugby Championship would be affected, it would still be possible to go ahead with a single round for its 2026 edition. The 2026 tournament was eventually scrapped, with three-Test tours between all four SANZAAR teams (Argentina, Australia, New Zealand, South Africa) rumoured as a potential replacement for the competitions 2028 edition as well. In October 2025, however, the Rugby Championship was confirmed to remain unchanged between 2027 and 2029, with the former edition being played in full (twelve matches) rather than its shortened format (six matches) commonly used during a Rugby World Cup year.

=== Format ===
The competition format consists of each team playing each other twice. Each team also host three matches, two making up a "mini-tour", which sees each nation play back-to-back Tests in one country, with the remaining three being away Tests.

SANZAAR confirmed in October 2025 that the 2027 Rugby Championship would kick off in July and finish in August, ahead of the 2027 Rugby World Cup. In September 2026, Rugby Australia confirmed the Wallabies' 2027 schedule. The tournament kicks off with Australia and New Zealand hosting Argentina and South Africa for two Tests, respectively. Rounds 3–4 take place between Australia/New Zealand and Argentina/South Africa on a home-and-away basis, with the latter two teams hosting New Zealand and Australia in the remaining two rounds.

== Table ==
Pos	Team	Pld	W	D	L	PF	PA	PD	TF	TA	TB	LB	Pts
1	Argentina	0	0	0	0	0	0	0	0	0	0	0	0
2	Australia	0	0	0	0	0	0	0	0	0	0	0	0
3	New Zealand	0	0	0	0	0	0	0	0	0	0	0	0
4	South Africa	0	0	0	0	0	0	0	0	0	0	0	0

Source: SANZAAR

== Fixtures ==
=== Round 1 ===
10 July 2027

New Zealand	v	South Africa

Eden Park, Auckland

10 July 2027

Australia	v	Argentina

Sydney Football Stadium, Sydney

=== Round 2 ===
17 July 2027

New Zealand	v	South Africa

Te Kaha, Christchurch

17 July 2027

Australia	v	Argentina

North Queensland Stadium, Townsville

=== Round 3 ===
31 July 2027

Australia	v	New Zealand

Melbourne Cricket Ground, Melbourne

31 July 2027

South Africa	v	Argentina

TBC

=== Round 4 ===
7 August 2027

New Zealand	v	Australia

Wellington Regional Stadium, Wellington

7 August 2027

Argentina	v	South Africa

TBC

=== Round 5 ===
21 August 2027

South Africa	v	Australia

TBC

21 August 2027

Argentina	v	New Zealand

TBC

=== Round 6 ===
28 August 2027

South Africa	v	Australia

TBC

Notes:

- This is set to be the 100th Test match between the two nations.

28 August 2027

Argentina	v	New Zealand

TBC

== Participants ==
Team	Stadium			Coach	Captain	World Rugby Ranking	
Team	Home stadium	Capacity	Location	Coach	Captain	Start (Note: As of 5 July 2027)	End (Note: As of 23 or 30 August 2027)
Argentina	TBC			TBC		TBC	
Australia	North Queensland Stadium	25,000	Townsville (vs. Argentina)	TBC		TBC	
Australia	Melbourne Cricket Ground	100,024	Melbourne (vs. New Zealand)	TBC		TBC	
Australia	Sydney Football Stadium	42,500	Sydney (vs. Argentina)	TBC		TBC	
New Zealand	TBC			TBC		TBC	
South Africa	TBC			TBC		TBC	

== See also ==
- 2027 Six Nations Championship
- 2027 Rugby World Cup warm-up matches
- 2027 men's rugby union internationals
- Argentina–Australia matches
- Argentina–New Zealand matches
- Argentina–South Africa matches
- Australia–New Zealand matches
- Australia–South Africa matches
- New Zealand–South Africa matches
