= 2020 July rugby union tests =

The 2020 mid-year rugby union internationals (also known as the summer internationals in the Northern Hemisphere) were international rugby union matches that were planned to be played during the July international window. They were all postponed or cancelled due to the COVID-19 pandemic.

== Series ==
France and Wales are to tour Argentina and New Zealand respectively as they did in 2016. They will both play a two-test series as France did four years prior, but unlike Wales as they played New Zealand three times. Ireland are again to tour Australia like they did in 2018, but this time would also play two tests instead of their previous three.

Event	Result	Victor
Argentina v France test series		
Australia v Ireland test series		
Japan v England test series		
New Zealand v Wales test series		
South Africa v Scotland test series		

=== Other tours ===
Italy are to play Argentina while Scotland are to play New Zealand on 18 July.

Team/Tour	Opponents
Wales tour	Japan
Italy tour	United States – Canada – Argentina
Scotland tour	New Zealand
Georgia tour	Blue Bulls – South Africa A – South Africa

== Fixtures ==
=== May ===
29 May 2020
20:45 CEST (UTC+02)

Spain	Postponed	(New Zealand) Classic All Blacks

Wanda Metropolitano, Madrid

=== June ===
21 June 2020
15:00 BST (UTC+01)

England	Cancelled (Note: Postponed to 25 October 2020, later cancelled due to players breaking COVID rules.)	Barbarians

Twickenham Stadium, London

27 June 2020

Japan	Cancelled	Wales

Shizuoka Stadium, Shizuoka

=== 3 July ===
3 July 2020

Blue Bulls (South Africa)	Cancelled	Georgia

TBA

=== 4 July ===
4 July 2020

Australia	Cancelled	Ireland

Suncorp Stadium, Brisbane

4 July 2020

Japan	Cancelled	England

Oita Stadium, Ōita

4 July 2020

Argentina	Cancelled	France

Estadio Mario Alberto Kempes, Córdoba

4 July 2020
19:35 NZST (UTC+12)

New Zealand	Cancelled	Wales

Eden Park, Auckland

4 July 2020
17:05 EDT (UTC-4)

South Africa	Cancelled	Scotland

Newlands Stadium, Cape Town

4 July 2020

Canada	Cancelled	(France) French Barbarians

TBA, Montreal

4 July 2020

United States	Cancelled	Italy

TBA

=== 11 July ===
11 July 2020

South Africa A	Cancelled	Georgia

TBA

11 July 2020

Australia	Cancelled	Ireland

Sydney Cricket Ground, Sydney

11 July 2020

Japan	Cancelled	England

Kobe Misaki Stadium, Kobe

11 July 2020
Postponed

Argentina	Cancelled	France

Estadio B.G. Estanislao López, Santa Fe

11 July 2020
19:35 NZST (UTC+12)

New Zealand	Cancelled	Wales

Sky Stadium, Wellington

11 July 2020
17:05 EDT (UTC-4)

South Africa	Cancelled	Scotland

Kings Park, Durban

11 July 2020

United States	Cancelled	(France) French Barbarians

TBA, New York City

11 July 2020

Canada	Cancelled	Italy

TBA, Halifax

=== 18 July ===
18 July 2020
17:05 EDT (UTC-4)

South Africa	Cancelled	Georgia

Nelson Mandela Bay Stadium, Port Elizabeth

18 July 2020

Argentina	Cancelled	Italy

Estadio Padre Ernesto Martearena, Salta

18 July 2020

Australia	Cancelled	Fiji

Queensland Country Bank Stadium, Townsville, Queensland

18 July 2020
19:35 NZST (UTC+12)

New Zealand	Cancelled	Scotland

Forsyth Barr Stadium, Dunedin

== See also ==
- 2020 end-of-year rugby union internationals
