= 2027 Rugby World Cup warm-up matches =

In August and September 2027, several rugby union national teams will play matches in preparation for the 2027 Rugby World Cup.

== Matches ==
=== August ===
29 August 2027

Scotland	v	France

Murrayfield Stadium, Edinburgh

=== September ===
4 September 2027

France	v	Scotland

Stade de France, Paris

September 2027

England	v	Ireland

Twickenham Stadium, London

11 September 2027

England	v	France

Twickenham Stadium, London

11 September 2027

Japan	v	Fiji

TBA

September 2027

England	v	Italy

Twickenham Stadium, London

18 September 2027

New Zealand	v	Scotland

Forsyth Barr Stadium, Dunedin

18 September 2027

Australia	v	Ireland

Canberra Stadium, Canberra

18 September 2027
18:00 AEST (UTC+10)

Fiji	v	South Africa

Central Coast Stadium, Gosford, Australia

== See also ==
- 2027 Rugby World Cup
- 2027 men's rugby union internationals
- 2027 Rugby Championship
