= North Queensland Stadium =

Stadium in Townsville, Queensland, Australia

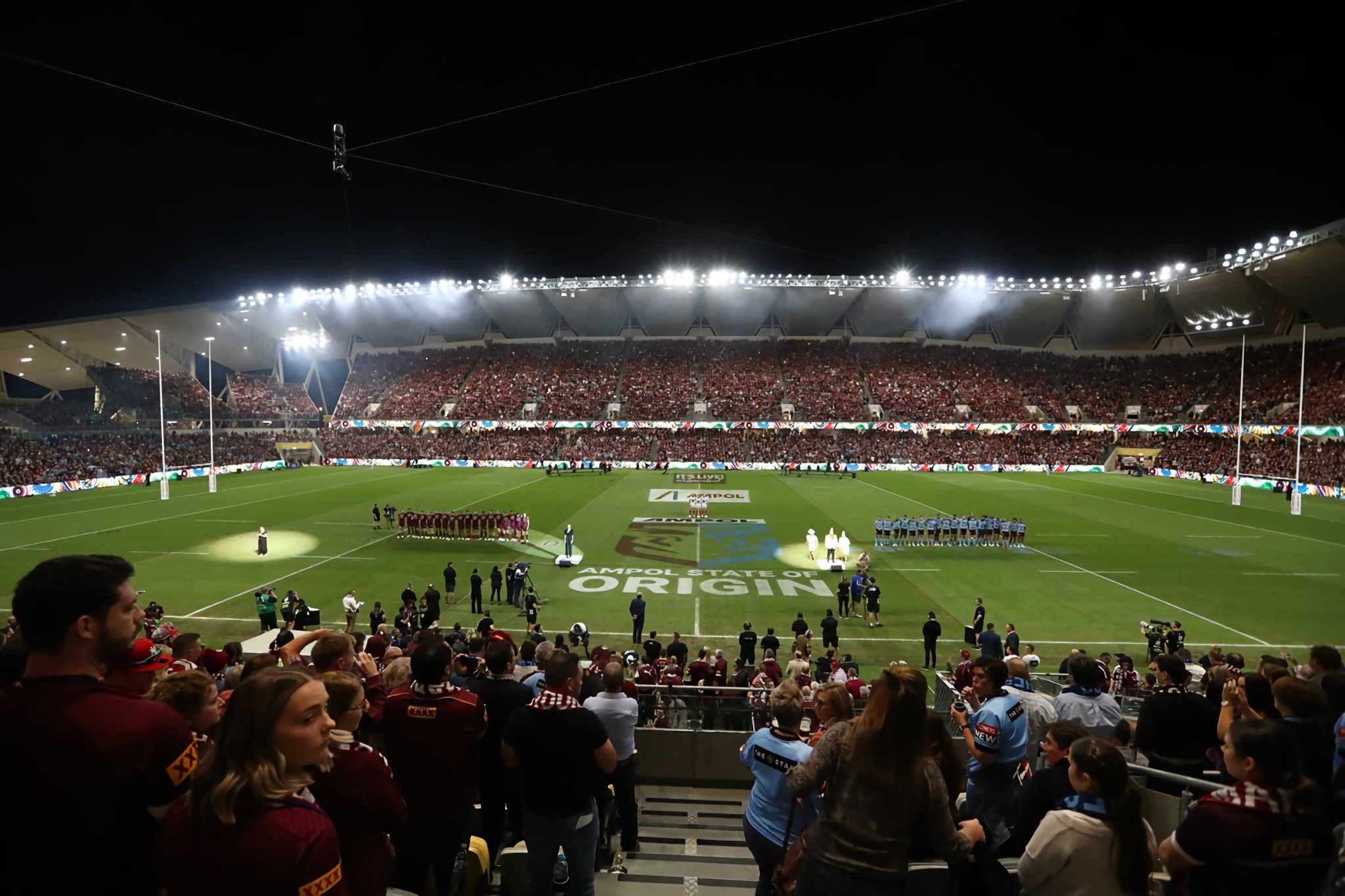
- Interior view, with temporary stands erected on one end
- Interactive map of North Queensland Stadium
- Location: Townsville, Queensland, Australia
- Coordinates: 19°15′58″S 146°49′0″E
- Operator: Stadiums Queensland
- Capacity: 25,455
- Surface: Grass
- Public transit: Townsville, Queensland Rail; Townsville CBD Bus Hub, Translink

Construction
- Groundbreaking: 16 August 2017; 9 years ago
- Built: 2017–2020
- Opened: 22 February 2020; 6 years ago
- Cost: $250 million
- Architects: Cox Architecture & Counterpoint Architecture
- General contractor: Watpac

Tenants
- North Queensland Cowboys (NRL) (2020–present); Queensland Reds (Super Rugby) (2023)

Website
- queenslandcountrybankstadium.com.au

North Queensland Stadium (known under naming rights as Queensland Country Bank Stadium) is a stadium located in the Townsville suburb of Railway Estate. It is primarily used for rugby league as the home ground of the North Queensland Cowboys which compete in the National Rugby League (NRL).

The stadium opened in 2020 after 5 years of construction and at a cost of $293 million. It was built to replace the aging Willows Sports Complex as the primary stadium in Townsville. The stadium boasts a capacity of 25,455.

The stadium is set to host games during the 2027 Rugby World Cup and will host football preliminaries during the 2032 Summer Olympics. The stadium also hosted game one of the 2021 State of Origin series.

== History ==
As part of Australia's 2022 FIFA World Cup bid in 2010, an analysis of Townsville's existing Willows Sports Complex suggested a total redevelopment of the site and outlined key issues including the growth rate of the surrounding suburbs and incompatibility of hosting major events in an expanding residential centre, with limited public transport access. In August 2011, the Bligh Government released a concept design for a new inner-city $185 million sporting stadium in South Townsville. The concept plan identified a 17.28 hectare parcel of land bounded by Saunders St and owned by QR National, as the ideal site for a new international standard stadium. The 30,000-seat stadium would include 100 open-air corporate boxes and 25 enclosed corporate suites. North Queensland Cowboys chairman Laurence Lancini supported the concept and said relocating the Cowboys' home ground to the inner-city site would not only benefit the club, but the city as a whole. Two months prior to the concept release, then-Queensland Premier Anna Bligh had declared Townsville the capital of north Queensland and had outlined the importance of sporting events and entertainment in the Townsville Futures Plan. The following year saw Bligh and the Queensland Labor Party lose the 2012 Queensland state election which resulted in the Queensland Liberal National Party not adopting the Townsville Futures Plan.

The concept of a new stadium for Townsville was again put on the agenda in the lead up to the 2015 Queensland state election. In December 2014, Queensland Opposition Leader Annastacia Palaszczuk promised the Queensland Labor Party would provide $100 million in funding for a new stadium in Townsville's central business district, should they win the election. In January 2015 then-premier Campbell Newman announced $150 million in funding for the same project that would be funded through the sale of state assets.

The last thing I want to say [is that] north Queensland deserves a new stadium.

— Cowboys co-captain Johnathan Thurston in a post-game speech following the North Queensland Cowboys 2015 NRL Grand Final victory.

In April 2015, the Townsville City Council purchased the 17.28ha site in South Townsville with the hope that funding could be secured for the project in the near future. A visit from then-Prime Minister Tony Abbott a month later raised hopes as it was revealed that the federal Liberal National Party was investigating options for Commonwealth funding towards the stadium. Just three days later Treasurer Joe Hockey ruled out Commonwealth funding for the project.

The campaign to build a new stadium in Townsville received national exposure in October 2015 when the North Queensland Cowboys secured their first National Rugby League premiership. With millions watching on a national broadcast and Prime Minister Malcolm Turnbull standing on the same stage, Cowboys captain Johnathan Thurston expressed his belief that north Queensland deserved a new stadium. Following Thurston's speech, the campaign received an immense amount of media coverage. Three days after the Cowboys' 2015 NRL Grand Final win, it was revealed that club officials would travel to Canberra later that month to lobby for federal funding. On 3 November 2015, Bill Shorten and the federal Labor party promised $100 million towards funding the project.

On 10 June 2016, Premier Annastacia Palaszczuk committed an extra $40 million towards the project which upped the total state contribution to $140 million. Three days later Prime Minister Malcolm Turnbull matched the federal Labor party's pledge of $100 million, essentially ensuring the project becomes a reality regardless of which major party won the 2016 federal election.

On 14 June 2019, the North Queensland Stadium website was officially launched alongside the announcement that international musician Sir Elton John would bring his final world tour, Farewell Yellow Brick Road, on 29 February 2020 as the first official act for the stadium.

The first NRL premiership match to be held at the ground was between Queensland rivals the North Queensland Cowboys and Brisbane Broncos in round one of the 2020 NRL season. Jake Turpin scored the stadium's first try, Jamayne Isaako scored the first goal and Michael Morgan slotted the first field goal as the Broncos won 28–21.

Game One of the 2021 State of Origin series was played in Townsville on 9 June 2021. The match was originally scheduled to be played at the Melbourne Cricket Ground but was moved to Townsville due to another COVID-19 outbreak in Melbourne. In front of a stadium record crowd 27,533 made possible thanks to temporary stands being erected at the northern end of the ground increasing the stadium's capacity to 28,000 for the game, New South Wales won 50–6 against Queensland, with the game being the first time since 2000 (and second in the game's history) that the New South Wales side scored above the half-century. It is currently the game with the second highest margin of 44.

On 11 September 2021, the ground hosted its first NRL finals matches when due to a COVID-19 outbreak in Sydney, two finals matches were moved to the stadium with the Sydney Roosters taking on the Gold Coast Titans in the first match, followed by the Penrith Panthers taking on South Sydney, in front of 18,244 spectators.

On 29 May 2021, the stadium hosted its first Rugby Union match, a Super Rugby Trans-Tasman game between the Queensland Reds and the Chiefs. Played in front of 9,238, the Reds defeated the Chiefs 40–34. Later that year on 25 September, it would host its first Rugby Union international test as part of the 2021 Rugby Championship. Played between Australia and Argentina, a crowd of 23,184 saw the Wallabies win 27–8. The stadium hosted 2 Super Rugby Pacific matches for the Queensland Reds in 2023 in a deal between the Queensland Rugby Union and the City of Townsville, with the goal of increasing the sports presence in North Queensland.

The stadium hosted its first soccer match on 8 April 2022, a women's international friendly between Australia and New Zealand. A crowd of 10,779 saw Australia win 2–1 with two stoppage time goals.

== Construction ==
Construction of the stadium, carried out by BESIX Watpac, began on 18 August 2017, and was completed in February 2020.

BESIX Watpac set out with an Indigenous participation goal of 6.6%. This figure almost doubled to 11.9%, equating to more than 122,065 hours undertaken by the Aboriginal workforce.

The project won three awards at the 2020 Master Builders Queensland construction awards for North Queensland: Project of the Year award, Best Sporting Facilities award and Excellence in Workplace Health & Safety.

== Name ==
In 2014, a funding proposal was released that suggested the stadium should officially be known as Stadium Northern Australia. Plans released in December 2016 revealed the stadium would be known as North Queensland Stadium.

In June 2019, expressions of interest were sought for naming rights to the stadium.

On 12 December 2019, Queensland Country Credit Union were announced as official naming rights sponsor of the stadium, with the venue to be commercially known as Queensland Country Bank Stadium.

== Transport ==
A new pedestrian bridge over Ross Creek from Blackwood Street is the planned connection between the Townsville CBD and the stadium. A pedestrian bridge over Ross Creek already exists 200 metres south of the project site on Fletcher Street. The Townsville Railway Station is located approximately 300 metres from the Fletcher Street pedestrian bridge and 500 metres from the stadium site. The new Reid Park bridge was constructed over the rail line simultaneously with the construction of the stadium to facilitate pedestrian movement. The project was praised by Member for Townsville Scott Stewart as being "crucial to ensure the efficient operation of North Queensland Stadium." Several bus stops also surround the stadium site, with a new main city bus terminal located in Ogden Street, Townsville City.

== Sports ==
=== Rugby league ===
North Queensland Stadium has been the permanent home ground of the North Queensland Cowboys men's team since 2020 and hosted some home games for the women's team since 2023. Additionally, it hosted the men's and women's 2021 All Stars match, the first game of the 2021 State of Origin series and two finals matches in the 2021 NRL season. In 2023, the stadium hosted the second Women's State of Origin game and matches in the Pacific Championships. In 2024, it hosted the 2024 All Stars match and Game 3 of the 2024 Women's State of Origin was played here.

Non-Cowboys rugby league matches
Date	Home	Score	Away	Attendance	Competition
20 February 2021	Indigenous All Stars (W)	0–24	Māori All Stars (W)	—N/a	2021 All Stars match
20 February 2021	Indigenous All Stars	10–10	Māori All Stars	20,206	2021 All Stars match
9 June 2021	Queensland	6–50	New South Wales	27,533^{1}	2021 State of Origin series
11 September 2021	Sydney Roosters	25–24	Gold Coast Titans	18,244	2021 NRL Finals Series
11 September 2021	Penrith Panthers	10–16	South Sydney Rabbitohs	18,244	2021 NRL Finals Series
22 June 2023	Queensland (W)	14–18	New South Wales (W)	18,275	2023 Women's State of Origin
14 October 2023	Australia	16–10	New Zealand	12,067	2023 Rugby League Pacific Championships
14 October 2023	Australia	38–12	Samoa	18,144	2023 Rugby League Pacific Championships
16 February 2024	Indigenous All Stars (W)	26–4	Māori All Stars (W)	—N/a	2024 All Stars match
16 February 2024	Indigenous All Stars	22–14	Māori All Stars	15,579	2024 All Stars match
27 June 2024	Queensland (W)	22–6	New South Wales (W)	22,819	2024 Women's State of Origin
31 October 2026	Australia	66–6	Cook Islands	19,172	2026 Men's Rugby League World Cup

Notes
^{1} Stadium capacity was increased with the use of temporary stands.

=== Association football ===
On 4 March 2020, it was announced that A-League side Brisbane Roar would play against Premier League club Crystal Palace on 11 July 2020. This was however indefinitely postponed due to the COVID-19 pandemic. In April 2022, it was announced that Brisbane Roar would play a friendly against Premier League club Aston Villa, which took place on 20 July 2022 with the English club winning 1–0.

On 8 April 2022, the stadium hosted a women's international friendly between Australia and New Zealand, with Australia winning 2–1.

On 30 June 2026, it was announced that the stadium would host one of two international friendlies dubbed the "Queensland Football Series" between Australia and Brazil, hosted that year on 25 September.

Date	Home	Result	Away	Attendance	Competition
8 April 2022	Australia	2–1	New Zealand	10,779	Friendly
20 July 2022	Brisbane Roar	0–1	Aston Villa	7,468	Queensland Champions Cup
25 September 2026	Australia	1–1	Brazil	25,440	Friendly

=== Rugby union ===
In February 2020, shortly before the North Queensland Stadium had officially opened, it was confirmed that Australia would play Fiji in the a Test match during the 2020 July Test window, the first rugby union Test match at the venue. However, due to the impacts of COVID-19, all Test matches in this period were postponed by World Rugby, and later cancelled.

In August 2021, it was announced that on Saturday 25 September, the Springboks and All Blacks would play their historic 100th Test at North Queensland Stadium. The game, won by New Zealand formed part of a double-header at the stadium with Australia also playing against Argentina. These games were part of the 2021 Rugby Championship.

In 2023, Super Rugby club the Queensland Reds announced they would take two games to the stadium as part of their 140-year anniversary season. Later in the year, the 2023 Super W final was also held at the venue where the Queensland Reds lost 38–30 to the Fijian Drua.

In November 2025, Rugby Australia announced its 14-Test schedule ahead of 2026, confirming one Test match at the venue against Japan in their two-Test Australia–Japan Test Series.

World Rugby announced in January 2026 that North Queensland Stadium would host four matches during the 2027 Rugby World Cup. Rugby Australia later announced that they would play three future Tests at the venue (2027, 2029, 2030), confirming one in the 2027 Rugby Championship, ahead of the 2027 Rugby World Cup.

List of Test matches
Date	Home	Score	Away	Attendance	Competition
25 September 2021	New Zealand	19–17	South Africa	23,184	2021 Rugby Championship
25 September 2021	Australia	27–8	Argentina	23,184	2021 Rugby Championship
6 September 2025	Australia	28–24	Argentina	20,163	2025 Rugby Championship
15 August 2026	Australia	56–17	Japan	18,076	2026 Australia–Japan Test Series
17 July 2027	Australia	—	Argentina	TBD	2027 Rugby Championship
3 October 2027	Georgia	—	Romania	TBD	2027 Rugby World Cup
9 October 2027	Chile	—	Hong Kong	TBD	2027 Rugby World Cup
15 October 2027	Tonga	—	Zimbabwe	TBD	2027 Rugby World Cup
17 October 2027	Spain	—	Canada	TBD	2027 Rugby World Cup
2029	Australia	—	Georgia	TBD	TBC
2030	Australia	—	Argentina	TBD	TBC

List of non-Test matches
Date	Home	Score	Away	Attendance	Competition
29 May 2021	Reds	40–34	Chiefs	9,238	Super Rugby Trans-Tasman
25 February 2023	Reds	13–47	Hurricanes	8,433	2023 Super Rugby Pacific
6 May 2023	Reds (W)	30–38	Drua (W)	—N/a	2023 Super W final
6 May 2023	Reds	24–32	Waratahs	5,942	2023 Super Rugby Pacific

=== Boxing ===
The stadium hosted Tim Tszyu's Super Welterweight bout with Jeff Horn for the IBF Australasian Super Welter & WBO Global Super Welter titles on 26 August 2020. Tszyu won the fight by TKO after Horn failed to return from his corner to start the 9th round.

== Concerts ==
Date	Performer(s)	Attendance	Notes
29 February 2020	Elton John	20,000	
31 July 2021	Tones and I	-	
16 February 2024	Jessica Mauboy	-	
22 March 2024	P!nk	-	
23 March 2024	P!nk	60,100	Combined attendance across two nights
27 June 2024	Dami Im	-	
30 November 2024	The Killers	18,000	
6 November 2025	Jelly Roll	-	
7 November 2026	Foo Fighters	TBD	
2 December 2026	Guns N' Roses	TBD	

== Accessibility ==
Walking	Pedestrian access: Queensland Country Bank Stadium is within walking distance of the CBD area of Townsville.
Bus	Bus access: Queensland Country Bank Stadium is close to bus-stops in the CBD and the Townsville City Bus Hub a short distance across Lowths Bridge in Ogden Street.; Frequent shuttle bus services are provided by Translink on match days and for special events.
Car	There is no public parking at the Stadium except for disability parking available by arrangement. However, paid parking stations are available within 5-minute walking distance in the CBD and park 'n' ride facilities are set up at Townsville Showgrounds/Lou Litster Park and Reid Park.

== Statues ==
Statue	Sport	Unveiled	Location	Link
Johnathan Thurston	Rugby League	13 March 2020	Outside gate A	

== Gallery ==
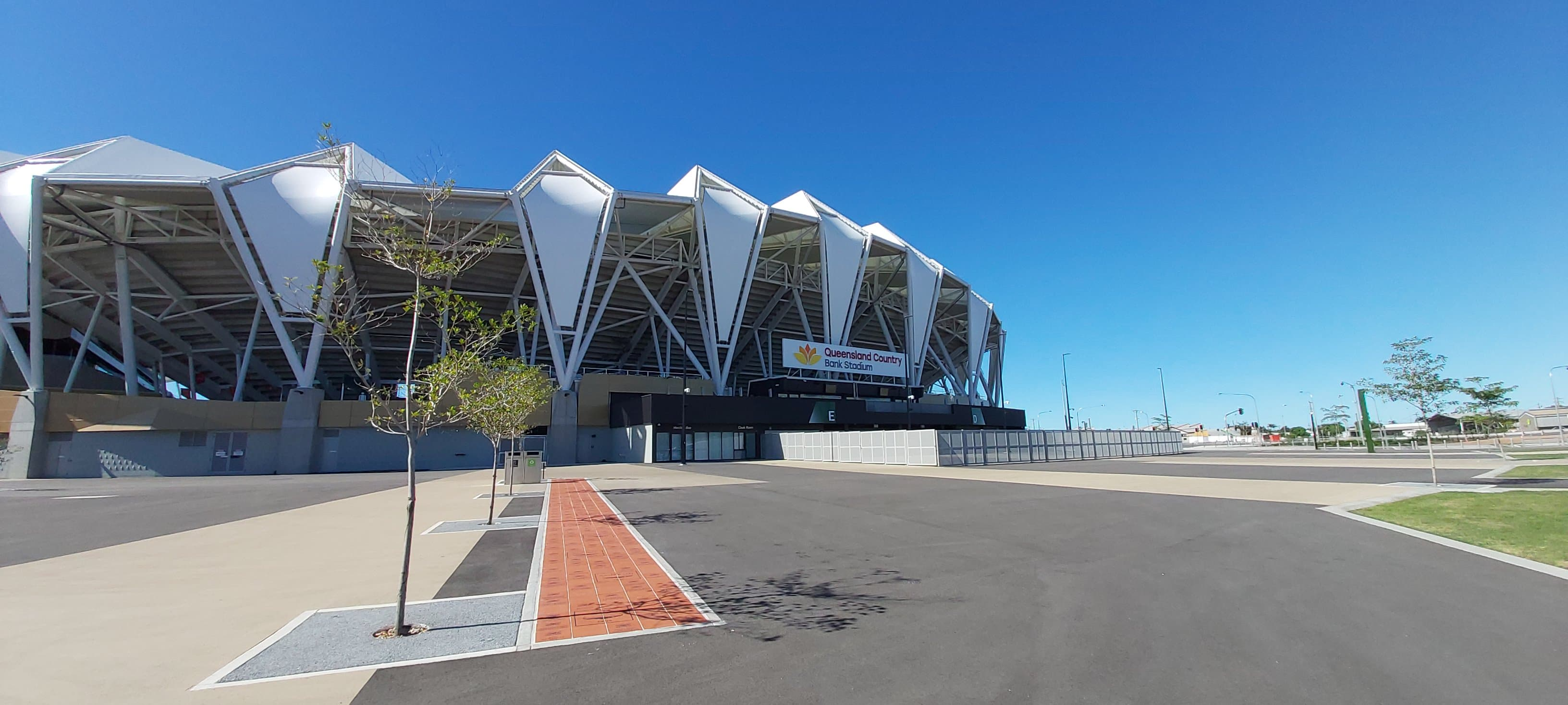
Southern Entrance June 2020

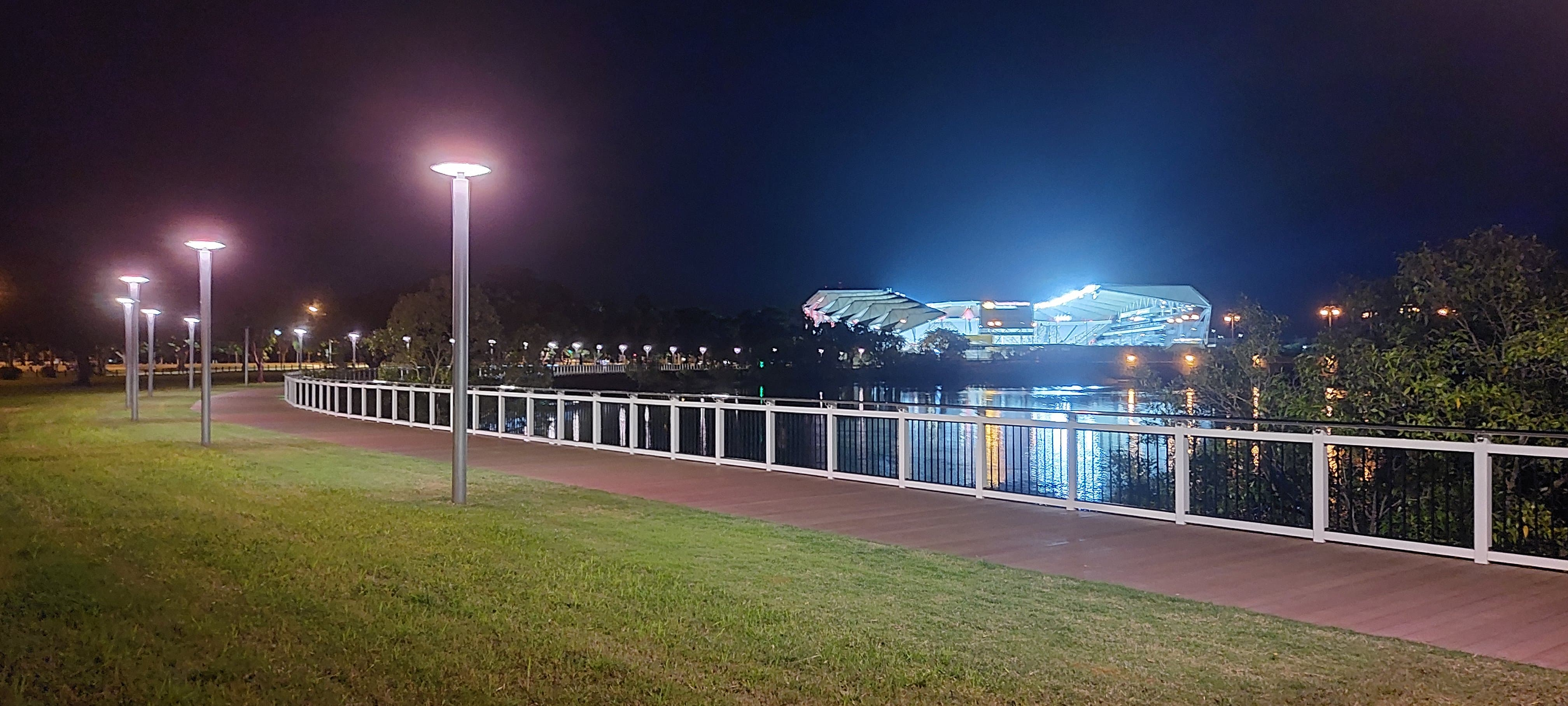
Stadium viewed from the Waterfront

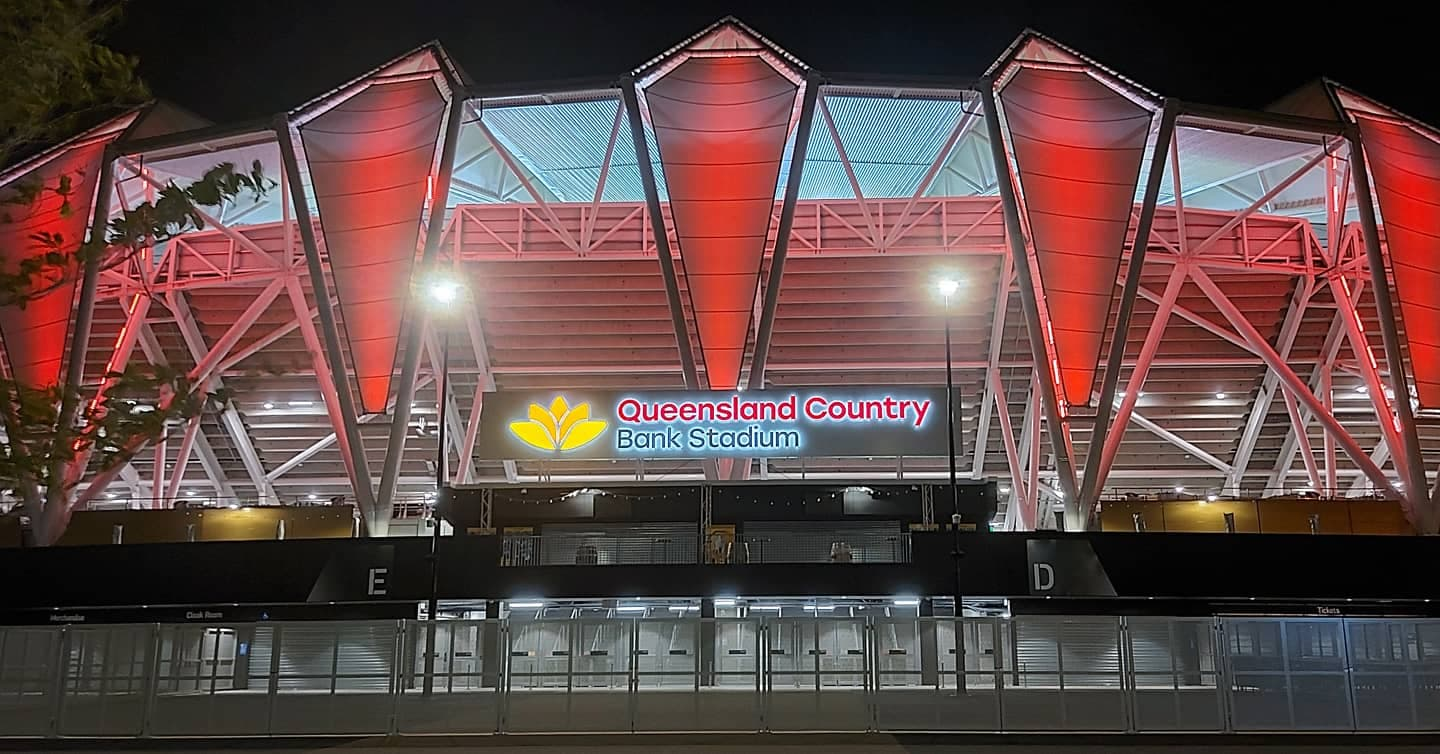
6 June 2020 illuminated for Queensland Day

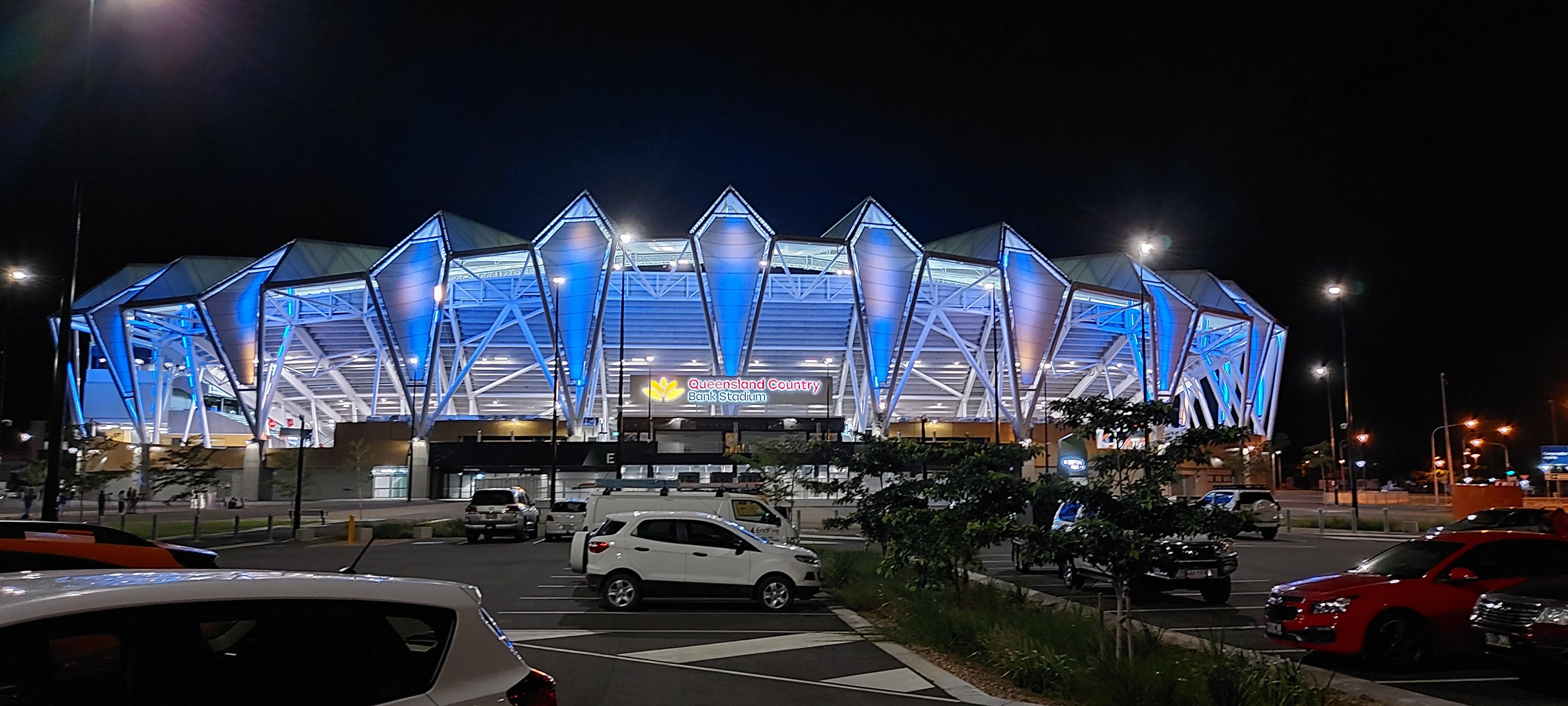
Illuminated for Cowboys vs Cronulla Sharks game

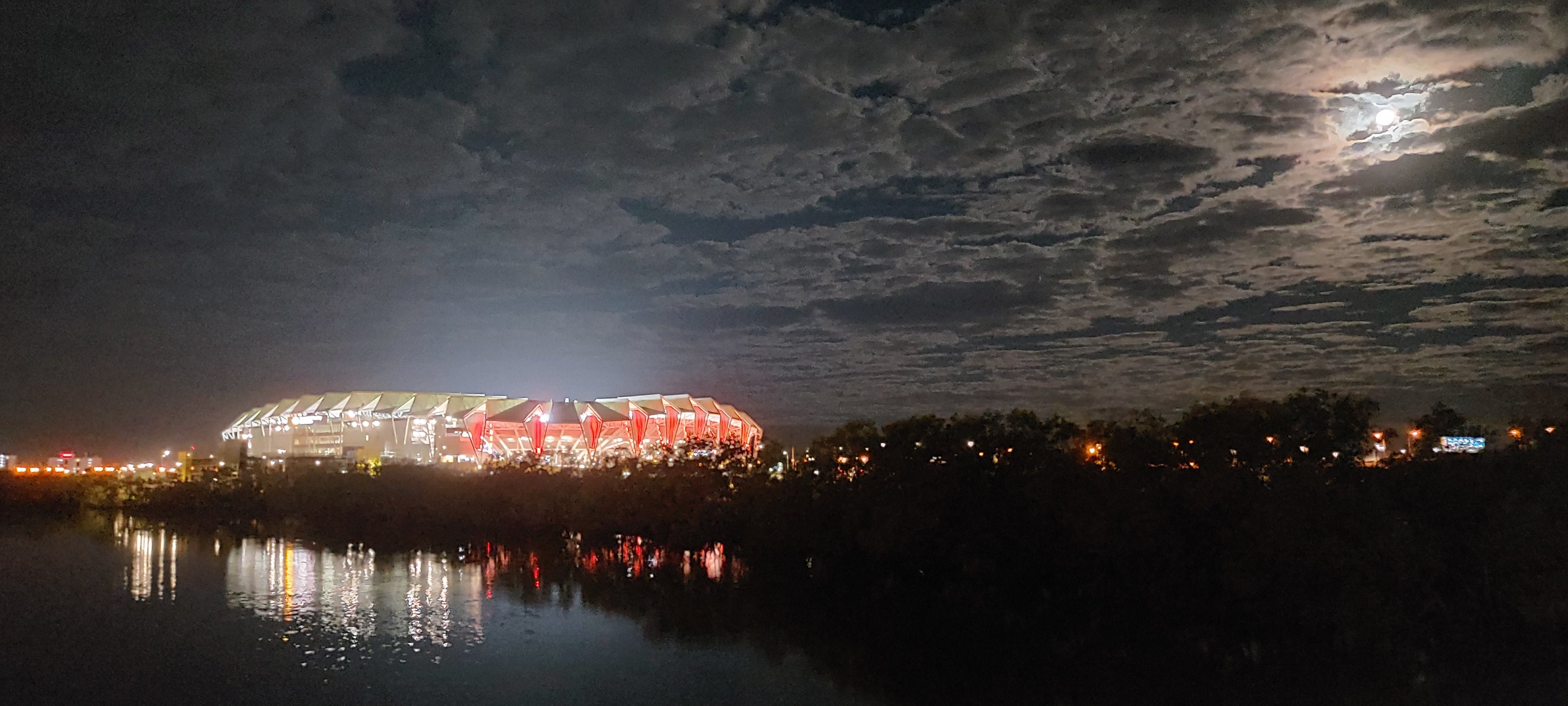
Viewed from the Fletcher Street Bridge

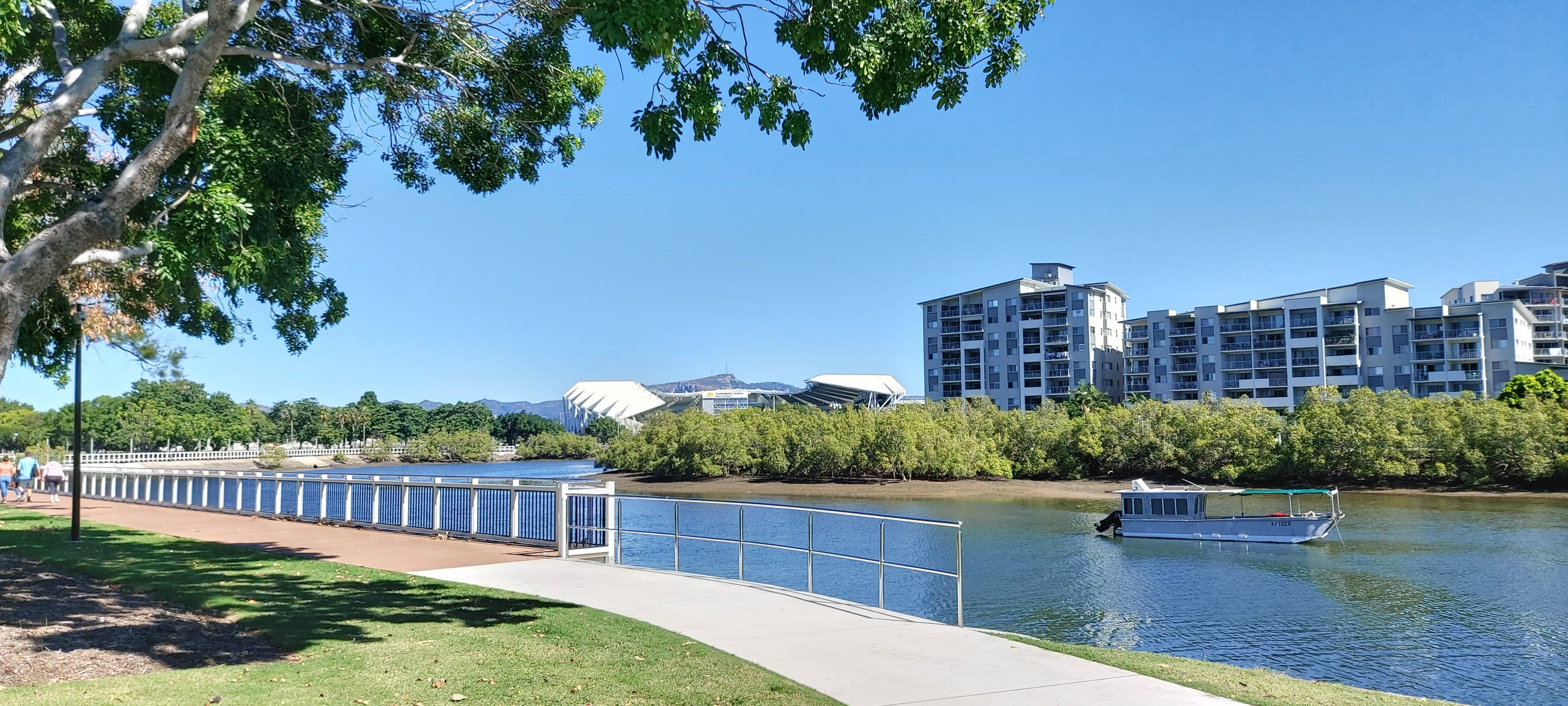
Stadium viewed from the Waterfront on a Winter's day

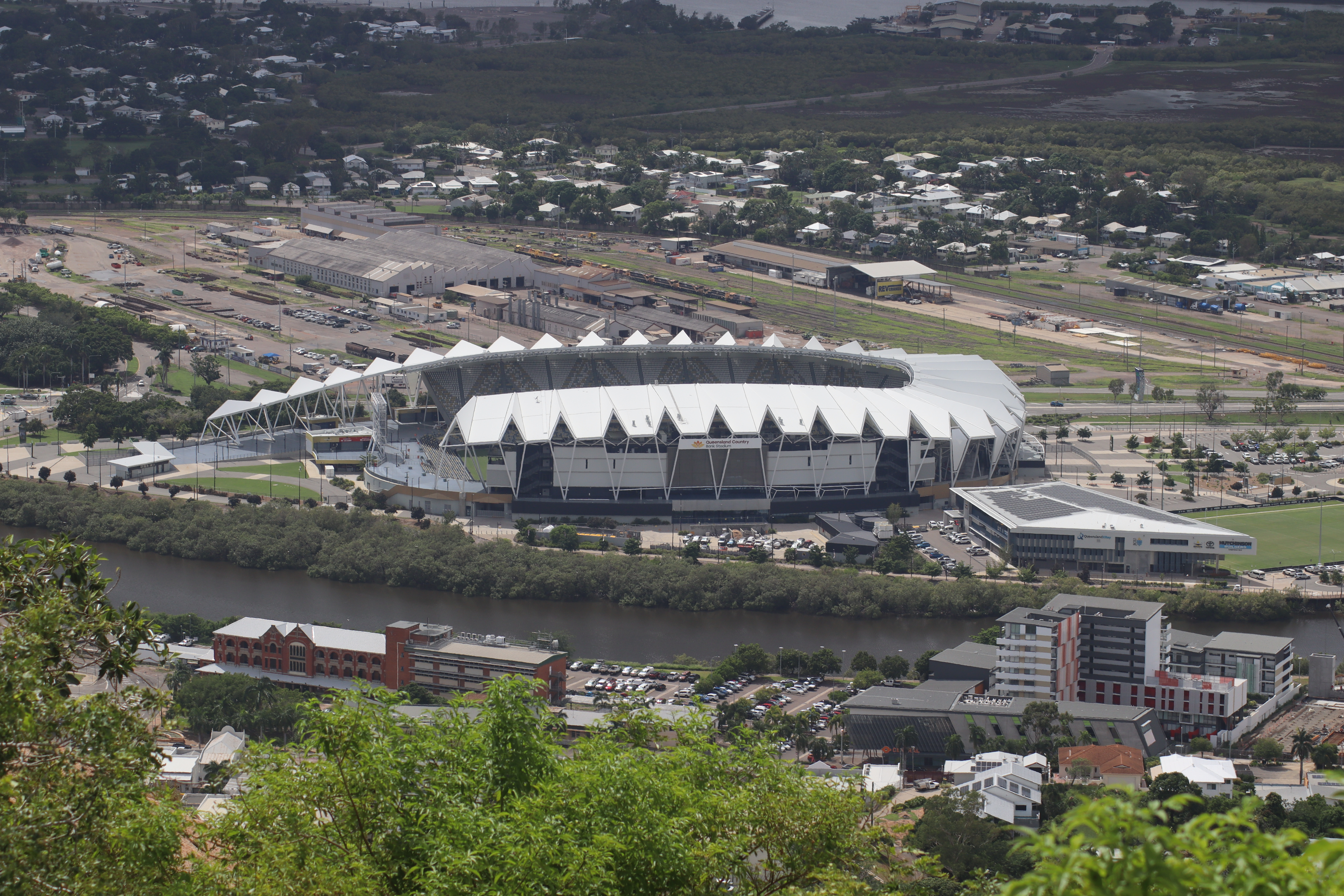
Stadium viewed from the top of Castle Hill
