= 2027 Women's Six Nations Championship =

Women's rugby union competition

- Date: 10 April – 15 May 2027
- Countries: England; France; Ireland; Italy; Scotland; Wales

Tournament statistics
- Official website: Official website

The 2027 Women's Six Nations Championship (known as the Guinness Women's Six Nations for sponsorship purposes, except in France, and branded as W6N) will be the 26th Women's Six Nations Championship, an annual rugby union competition featuring the women's national teams of England, France, Ireland, Italy, Scotland and Wales. It is scheduled to begin on 10 April 2027 and will end on 15 May.

== Participants ==
Nation	Stadium			Coach	Captain	World Rugby Ranking	
Nation	Home stadium	Capacity	Location	Coach	Captain	Start (Note: As of 10 April 2027)	End (Note: As of 15 May 2027)
England	Twickenham Stadium	82,000	London	(New Zealand) John Mitchell			
England	Stadium of Light	49,000	Sunderland	(New Zealand) John Mitchell			
England	Franklin's Gardens	15,249	Northampton	(New Zealand) John Mitchell			
France	Stade de l'Abbé-Deschamps	17,897	Auxerre	(France) François Ratier			
France	Stade Saint-Symphorien	30,000	Metz	(France) François Ratier			
Ireland	Aviva Stadium	51,700	Dublin	(England) Scott Bemand			
Ireland	Dexcom Stadium	10,500	Galway	(England) Scott Bemand			
Italy							
Scotland	Edinburgh Rugby Stadium	7,800	Edinburgh	Dave Butcher			
Scotland	Murrayfield Stadium	67,144	Edinburgh	Dave Butcher			
Wales	Cardiff Arms Park	12,125	Cardiff	(Wales) Sean Lynn			
Wales	Millennium Stadium	73,931	Cardiff	(Wales) Sean Lynn			

== Table ==
Pos	Team	Pld	W	D	L	PF	PA	PD	TF	TA	GS	TB	LB	Pts	ENG	FRA	IRE	ITA	SCO	WAL
1	England	0	0	0	0	0	0	0	0	0	0	0	0	0	—	15 May		24 Apr	17 Apr	
2	France	0	0	0	0	0	0	0	0	0	0	0	0	0		—			24 Apr	8 May
3	Ireland	0	0	0	0	0	0	0	0	0	0	0	0	0	8 May	17 Apr	—			
4	Italy	0	0	0	0	0	0	0	0	0	0	0	0	0		10 Apr	15 May	—		17 Apr
5	Scotland	0	0	0	0	0	0	0	0	0	0	0	0	0			10 Apr	8 May	—	15 May
6	Wales	0	0	0	0	0	0	0	0	0	0	0	0	0	10 Apr		24 Apr			—

First match(es) will be played: 10 April 2027. Source:
Legend: Blue = home team win; Yellow = draw; Red = away team win.

Table ranking rules

- Four points are awarded for a win.
- Two points are awarded for a draw.
- A bonus point is awarded to a team that scores four or more tries, or loses by seven points or fewer.
- Three bonus points are awarded to a team that wins all five of their matches (a Grand Slam). This ensures that a Grand Slam winning team would top the table with at least 23 points, as another team could lose one match while winning two bonus points and win the other four matches while winning four bonus points for a maximum of 22 points.
- Tiebreakers
  - If two or more teams are tied on table points, the team with the better points difference (points scored against points conceded) is ranked higher.
  - If the above tiebreaker fails to separate tied teams, the team that scores the higher number of total tries (including penalty tries) in their matches is ranked higher.
  - If two or more teams remain tied after applying the above tiebreakers then those teams will be placed at equal rank; if the tournament has concluded and more than one team is placed first then the title will be shared between them.

== Fixtures ==
The fixtures for the 2027 Six Nations were announced on 13 May 2026.

=== Round 1 ===
10 April 2027
13:30 CEST (UTC+2)

Italy	v	France

10 April 2027
14:45 BST (UTC+1)

Wales	v	England

Millennium Stadium, Cardiff

10 April 2027
17:00 BST (UTC+1)

Scotland	v	Ireland

Murrayfield Stadium, Edinburgh

=== Round 2 ===
17 April 2027
13:15 CEST (UTC+2)

Italy	v	Wales

17 April 2027
14:30 IST (UTC+1)

Ireland	v	France

Dexcom Stadium, Galway

17 April 2027
16:45 BST (UTC+1)

England	v	Scotland

Stadium of Light, Sunderland

=== Round 3 ===
24 April 2027
12:30 BST (UTC+1)

Wales	v	Ireland

Cardiff Arms Park, Cardiff

24 April 2027
15:45 CEST (UTC+2)

France	v	Scotland

Stade de l'Abbé-Deschamps, Auxerre

24 April 2027
17:00 BST (UTC+1)

England	v	Italy

Franklin's Gardens, Northampton

=== Round 4 ===
8 May 2027
13:30 CEST (UTC+2)

France	v	Wales

Stade Saint-Symphorien, Metz

8 May 2027
14:45 IST (UTC+1)

Ireland	v	England

Aviva Stadium, Dublin

8 May 2027
17:00 BST (UTC+1)

Scotland	v	Italy

Edinburgh Rugby Stadium, Edinburgh

=== Round 5 ===
15 May 2027
13:15 CEST (UTC+2)

Italy	v	Ireland

15 May 2027
14:30 BST (UTC+1)

Scotland	v	Wales

Edinburgh Rugby Stadium, Edinburgh

15 May 2027
16:45 BST (UTC+1)

England	v	France

Twickenham Stadium, London

== See also ==
- 2027 Six Nations Championship
- 2027 Six Nations Women's U21 Series
