= Zac Saddler =

Australian rugby league footballer (born 1999)

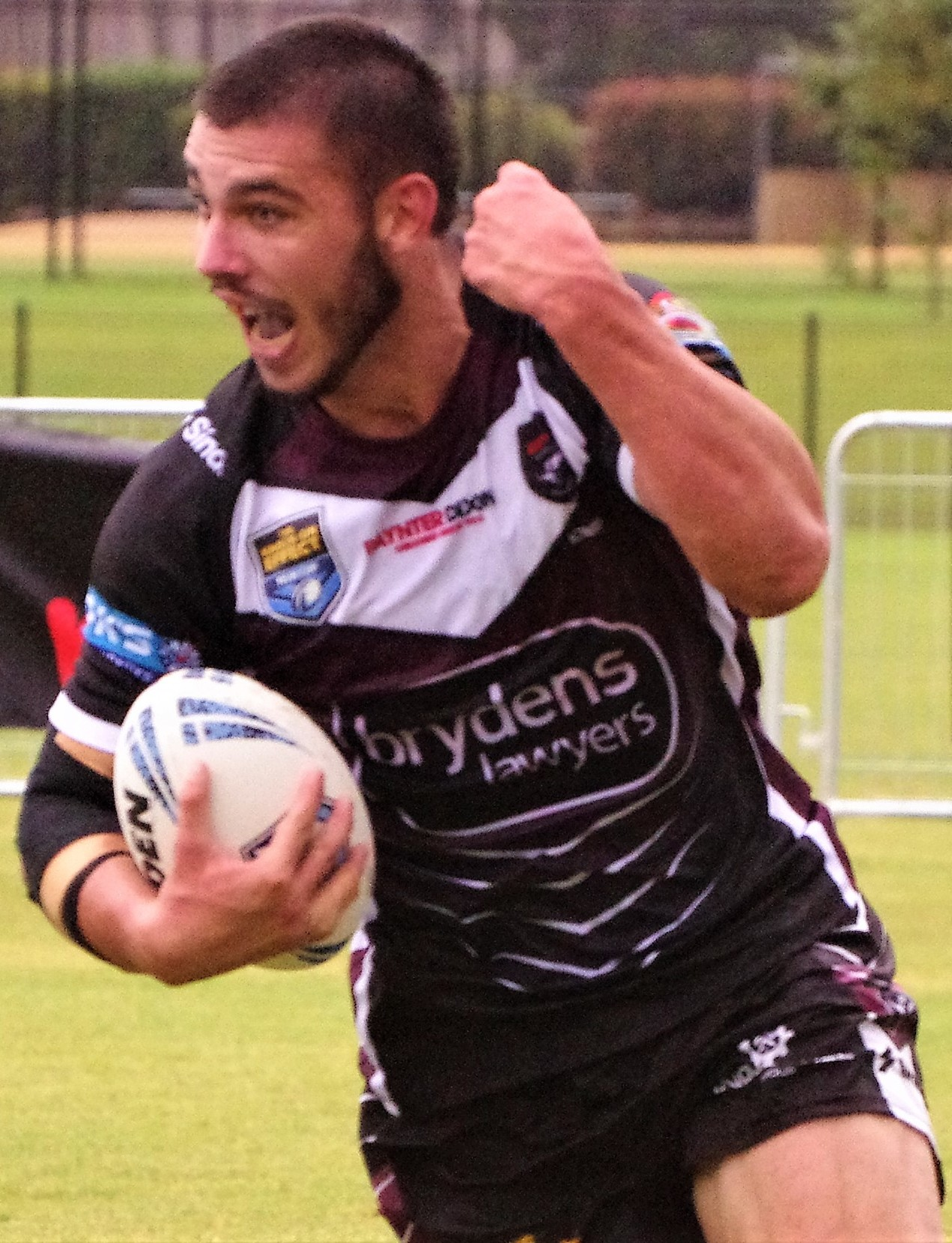

Personal information
- Full name: Zac Saddler
- Born: 16 June 1999 (age 26); Bathurst, New South Wales, Australia
- Height: 193 cm (6 ft 4 in)
- Weight: 101 kg (15 st 13 lb; 223 lb)

Playing information
- Position: Second-row
Club
Years	Team	Pld	T	G	FG	P
2021	Manly Sea Eagles	3	0	0	0	0
2023–2025	Limoux Grizzlies	0	0	0	0	0
	Total	3	0	0	0	0
Representative
Years	Team	Pld	T	G	FG	P
2020–21	Indigenous All Stars	2	0	0	0	0
- Source: As of 12 December 2022

Zac Saddler (born 16 June 1999) is an Australian professional rugby league footballer who plays as a second-row forward for the Mudgee Dragons in the Western Premiership.

He played for the Indigenous All Stars at representative level in 2020 and 2021.

== Playing career ==
Saddler made his first grade debut in round 9 of the 2021 NRL season for Manly-Warringah against the New Zealand Warriors at Brookvale Oval.

During Manly's round 12 loss against Newcastle, Saddler was rushed to hospital with a depressed skull fracture.

On 6 October 2021, Saddler was released by the Manly club. In 2022, Saddler played for in the NSW Cup for Canberra. In 2023, Saddler played for XIII Limouxin in the Elite One Championship. In 2024, Saddler signed for the Mudgee Dragons.
