= 2020 Ireland rugby union tour of Australia =

- Date: 4–11 July 2020
- Coach: Andy Farrell
Opponent
| P | W | D | L |
Australia

Tour chronology
- ← Australia 2018 New Zealand 2022 →

In July 2020, Ireland was scheduled to play a two-Test series against Australia as part of the 2020 July rugby union tests. However, on 15 May 2020, due to the COVID-19 pandemic, the tour was cancelled. The scheduled series was to occur two years after Ireland previously toured Australia, with the visiting side winning that series 2–1, the first time Ireland had won a series in Australia since 1979. The series was also set to be Andy Farrell's first overseas tour since becoming Ireland's head coach, as well as new Australia head coach Dave Rennie's first in charge since he took over from Michael Cheika following his departure at the conclusion of the 2019 Rugby World Cup.

== Schedule ==
| Date | Venue | Home | Score | Away |
|---|---|---|---|---|
| 4 July 2020 | Lang Park, Brisbane | Australia | | Ireland |
| 11 July 2020 | Sydney Cricket Ground, Sydney | Australia | | Ireland |

== Venues ==
The dates and venues were announced on 1 November 2019. The two venues were Brisbane's Lang Park, and the Sydney Cricket Ground (SCG) in Moore Park, Sydney. At the time of the announcement, the SCG had not hosted a Wallabies Test in more than three decades. The Sydney Morning Herald revealed that the venue was selected as other venues, such as the Sydney Football Stadium and Stadium Australia, were undergoing renovations. Western Sydney Stadium in Sydney's Parramatta suburb was touted as a potential option, but the SCG won out thanks to its traditionally strong rugby supporter base in the Eastern Suburbs.

| Brisbane | Sydney |
|---|---|
| Lang Park | Sydney Cricket Ground |
| Capacity: 52,500 | Capacity: 48,000 |
2020 Ireland rugby union tour of Australia is located in Australia

== See also ==
- 2020 July rugby union tests
- History of rugby union matches between Australia and Ireland
