= 2027 Six Nations Championship =

International rugby union competition

2027 Men's Six Nations Championship
- Date: 5 February – 13 March 2027
- Countries: England; France; Ireland; Italy; Scotland; Wales

Tournament statistics

The 2027 Men's Six Nations Championship (known as the Guinness Men's Six Nations for sponsorship reasons and branded as M6N) is a rugby union competition scheduled to take place from early February to mid-March 2027, featuring the men's national teams of England, France, Ireland, Italy, Scotland and Wales. It is the 133rd season of the competition (including its incarnations as the Home Nations Championship and the Five Nations Championship), and the 28th since it expanded to become the Six Nations Championship in 2000. It is scheduled to begin on 5 February 2027 with a Friday night match between Ireland and England, and will end with Ireland facing France on 13 March.

== Participants ==
Nation	Stadium			Head coach	Captain	World Rugby Ranking	
Nation	Home stadium	Capacity	Location	Head coach	Captain	Start (Note: As of 1 February 2027)	End (Note: As of 15 March 2027)
England	Twickenham Stadium	82,000	London				
France	Stade de France	81,338	Saint-Denis				
Ireland	Aviva Stadium	51,700	Dublin				
Italy	Stadio Olimpico	73,261	Rome				
Scotland	Murrayfield Stadium	67,144	Edinburgh				
Wales	Millennium Stadium	73,931	Cardiff				

== Table ==
Pos	Team	Pld	W	D	L	PF	PA	PD	TF	TA	GS	TB	LB	Pts	ENG	FRA	IRE	ITA	SCO	WAL
1	England	0	0	0	0	0	0	0	0	0	0	0	0	0	—	14 Feb		20 Feb	13 Mar	
2	France	0	0	0	0	0	0	0	0	0	0	0	0	0		—			21 Feb	6 Feb
3	Ireland	0	0	0	0	0	0	0	0	0	0	0	0	0	5 Feb	13 Mar	—			
4	Italy	0	0	0	0	0	0	0	0	0	0	0	0	0		6 Mar	13 Feb	—		13 Mar
5	Scotland	0	0	0	0	0	0	0	0	0	0	0	0	0			5 Mar	6 Feb	—	13 Feb
6	Wales	0	0	0	0	0	0	0	0	0	0	0	0	0	6 Mar		20 Feb			—

Updated to match(es) played on scheduled. Source: Six Nations Rugby
Legend: Blue = home team win; Yellow = draw; Red = away team win.

Table ranking rules

- Four points are awarded for a win.
- Two points are awarded for a draw.
- A bonus point is awarded to a team that scores four or more tries, or loses by seven points or fewer. If a team scores four or more tries, and loses by seven points or fewer, they are awarded both bonus points.
- Three bonus points are awarded to a team that wins all five of their matches (a Grand Slam). This ensures that a Grand Slam-winning team would top the table with at least 23 points, as there would otherwise be a scenario where a team could win all five matches with no bonus points for a total of 20 points and another team could win four matches with bonus points and lose their fifth match while claiming one or more bonus points giving a total of 21 or 22 points.
- Tiebreakers
  - If two or more teams are tied on table points, the team with the better points difference (points scored less points conceded) is ranked higher.
  - If the above tiebreaker fails to separate tied teams, the team that scores the higher number of total tries (including penalty tries) in their matches is ranked higher.
  - If two or more teams remain tied after applying the above tiebreakers then those teams will be placed at equal rank; if the tournament has concluded and more than one team is placed first then the title will be shared between them.

== Fixtures ==
The fixtures for the 2027 Six Nations were announced on 9 March 2026, beginning with a Friday night game between Ireland and England. It will also feature the first Friday night game held in Edinburgh as Scotland host Ireland in the fourth round of matches. The competition will also take place over the reduced timeframe established the previous season; instead of having rest weeks after rounds 2 and 3 as happened until 2025, it will only have a rest week after round 3.

=== Round 1 ===
5 February 2027
20:10 GMT

Ireland	v	England

Aviva Stadium, Dublin

6 February 2027
14:10 GMT

Scotland	v	Italy

Murrayfield Stadium, Edinburgh

6 February 2027
17:40 CET

France	v	Wales

Stade de France, Saint-Denis

=== Round 2 ===
13 February 2027
15:10 CET

Italy	v	Ireland

Stadio Olimpico, Rome

13 February 2027
16:40 GMT

Scotland	v	Wales

Murrayfield Stadium, Edinburgh

14 February 2027
15:10 GMT

England	v	France

Twickenham Stadium, London

=== Round 3 ===
20 February 2027
14:10 GMT

Wales	v	Ireland

Millennium Stadium, Cardiff

20 February 2027
16:40 GMT

England	v	Italy

Twickenham Stadium, London

21 February 2027
16:10 CET

France	v	Scotland

Stade de France, Saint-Denis

=== Round 4 ===
5 March 2027
20:10 GMT

Scotland	v	Ireland

Murrayfield Stadium, Edinburgh

6 March 2027
15:10 CET

Italy	v	France

Stadio Olimpico, Rome

6 March 2027
16:40 GMT

Wales	v	England

Millennium Stadium, Cardiff

=== Round 5 ===
13 March 2027
15:10 CET

Italy	v	Wales

Stadio Olimpico, Rome

13 March 2027
16:40 GMT

England	v	Scotland

Twickenham Stadium, London

13 March 2027
20:10 GMT

Ireland	v	France

Aviva Stadium, Dublin

== See also ==
- 2027 Six Nations Under 20s Championship
- 2027 Women's Six Nations Championship
- 2027 Six Nations Women's U21 Series
- 2027 Nations Championship
