= 2025 end-of-year rugby union internationals =

International rugby union matches

The 2025 end-of-year rugby union internationals, also known as the Autumn Internationals or Quilter Nations Series, are international rugby union matches that will be mostly played in the Northern Hemisphere during the November international window. The fixtures for the Quilter Nations Series, which includes only the matches involving at least one Six Nations member team, were announced on 18 February 2025.

== Matches ==
=== 18 October ===
18 October 2025
13:00 JST (UTC+9)

Japan A	7–71	Australia A
Try: Yazaki 21' c Con: Nakakusu (1/1) 22'	Report	Try: Swain (2) 5' c, 16' c Grealy 13' m Ryan (2) 19' c, 75' m Wilson 27' c Reimer 41' c Faessler 44' c Van Nek 46' c Robertson 55' m Ieli 61' c Con: Donaldson (8/11) 6', 17', 20', 28', 41', 45', 47'

Yodoko Sakura Stadium, Osaka
Attendance: 10,105
Referee: Morgan White (Hong Kong)

Team details

FB	15	Yoshitaka Yazaki	(yellow card) 45'
RW	14	Kazuma Ueda
OC	13	Yuya Hirose
IC	12	Siosaia Fifita
LW	11	Halatoa Vailea		(substituted off) 56'
FH	10	Ichigo Nakakusu		(substituted off) 49'
SH	9	Shuntaro Kitamura		(substituted off) 49'
N8	8	Amanaki Saumaki		(substituted off) 40'
OF	7	Akito Okui (c)
BF	6	Tyler Paul
RL	5	Shu Yamamoto		(substituted off) 50'
LL	4	David Van Zeeland
TP	3	Sanshiro Kihara		(substituted off) 56'
HK	2	Shodai Hirao		(substituted off) 64'
LP	1	Sho Furuhata		(substituted off) 64'
Replacements:
HK	16	Shoma Sagawa		(substituted on) 64'
PR	17	Yuichiro Taniguchi		(substituted on) 64'
PR	18	Yuta Kokaji		(substituted on) 56'
LK	19	Shohei Ito		(substituted on) 50'
N8	20	Rikuto Nakatani		(substituted on) 40'
SH	21	Asahi Doei		(substituted on) 49'
CE	22	Shinya Komura		(substituted on) 49'
FH	23	Kotaro Ito		(substituted on) 56'
Coach:
(England) Neal Hatley

FB	15	Mac Grealy
RW	14	Tim Ryan
OC	13	Joey Walton		(substituted off) 55'
IC	12	Hamish Stewart	(yellow card) 70'
LW	11	Ollie Sapsford	(red card) 50'
FH	10	Ben Donaldson
SH	9	Teddy Wilson		(substituted off) 49'
N8	8	Pete Samu
OF	7	Luke Reimer		(substituted off) 51'
BF	6	Rory Scott
RL	5	Josh Canham
LL	4	Darcy Swain		(substituted off) 58'
TP	3	Rhys van Nek		(substituted off) 50'
HK	2	Matt Faessler (c)		(substituted off) 46'
LP	1	Isaac Aedo Kailea		(substituted off) 49'
Replacements:
HK	16	Ethan Dobbins		(substituted on) 46'
PR	17	Lington Ieli		(substituted on) 49'
PR	18	Daniel Botha		(substituted on) 50'
LK	19	Seru Uru		(substituted on) 58'
N8	20	Joe Brial		(substituted on) 51'
SH	21	Henry Robertson		(substituted on) 49'
CE	22	Harry McLaughlin-Phillips		(substituted on) 71'
WG	23	Lachie Anderson		(substituted on) 55'
Coach:
(New Zealand) Simon Cron

Assistant referees:
Kouki Yamauchi (Japan)
Masayoshi Kondo (Japan)
Television match official:
Yu Kawahara (Japan)
Foul play review officer:
Yosuke Kimura (Japan)

18 October 2025
14:00 COT (UTC-5)

Colombia	38–24	Peru
Try: Mosquera 3' m Alzate 16' m Galvez 48' c Gómez 60' c Llanos 64' c Suárez 70' c Con: Galvez (4/6) 49', 61', 65', 71'	Report	Try: Cárdenas 20' c Velarde 29' c Monier Bautista (2) 73' m, 77' m Con: Orellana (2/2) 21', 30'

Estadio Cincuentenario, Medellín

=== 24/25 October ===
24 October 2025
19:10 HKT (UTC+8)

Hong Kong	14–59	Japan A
Try: Hrstich 32' c Scott 66' c Con: McCann (1/1) 33'; McNeish (1/1) 67'	Report	Try: Hirose (2) 4' c, 21' c Ueda 12' m Takamoto 27' c Van Zeeland 39' c Hirao 47' m Mori 55' c Kitamura 64' c Nakakusu 71' c Con: Matsunaga (5/7) 5', 22', 28', 40', 56'; Nakakusu (2/2) 65', 72'x§

Kai Tak Stadium, Kowloon
Attendance: 7,702
Referee: Reuben Keane (Australia)

Team details

FB	15	Matt Worley
RW	14	Marcus Ramage
OC	13	Benjamin Axten-Burrett
IC	12	Thomas Hill
LW	11	Dylan McCann		(substituted off) 58'
FH	10	Joe Barker		(substituted off) 48'
SH	9	Brendon Nell		(substituted off) 70'
N8	8	Joshua Hrstich (c)
OF	7	Pierce MacKinlay-West		(substituted off) 26'	(substituted on) 35'	(substituted off) 52'
BF	6	Tyler McNutt
RL	5	Kyle Sullivan
LL	4	Max Murphy		(substituted on) 60'
TP	3	Zacceus Cinnamond	(yellow card) 25'			(substituted off) 45'
HK	2	Calum Scott		(substituted off) 77'
LP	1	Sunia Fameitau		(substituted off) 54'
Replacements:
HK	16	Benedict Sheldon		(substituted on) 77'
PR	17	Rory Cinnamond		(substituted on) 52'
PR	18	Faizal Solomona-Penesa		(substituted on) 26'	(substituted off) 35'	(substituted on) 45'
LK	19	James Rivers		(substituted on) 60'
FL	20	James Sawyer				(substituted on) 52'
SH	21	Chui Wai Lap		(substituted on) 70'
FH	22	Gregor McNeish		(substituted on) 48'
CE	23	Guy Spanton		(substituted on) 58'
Coach:
(New Zealand) Logan Asplin

FB	15	Takurō Matsunaga	(substituted off) 37'
RW	14	Kazuma Ueda
OC	13	Yuya Hirose
IC	12	Yuto Mori
LW	11	Tomu Takamoto
FH	10	Shinya Komura	(substituted off) 60'
SH	9	Asahi Doei	(substituted off) 60'
N8	8	Rikuto Nakatani	(substituted off) 37'
OF	7	Akito Okui (c)
BF	6	Shohei Ito
RL	5	David Van Zeeland	(substituted off) 54'
LL	4	Epineri Uluiviti
TP	3	Yuta Kokaji	(substituted off) 40'
HK	2	Shodai Hirao	(substituted off) 60'
LP	1	Sho Furuhata	(substituted off) 46'
Replacements:
HK	16	Shoma Sagawa	(substituted on) 60'
PR	17	Yuichiro Taniguchi	(substituted on) 46'
PR	18	Sanshiro Kihara	(substituted on) 40'
LK	19	Shu Yamamoto	(substituted on) 54'
FL	20	Keito Aoki	(substituted on) 37'
SH	21	Shuntaro Kitamura	(substituted on) 60'
FB	22	Ichigo Nakakusu	(substituted on) 60'
FH	23	Kotaro Ito	(substituted on) 37'
Coach:
(England) Neal Hatley

Assistant referees:
Kouki Yamauchi (Japan)
Masayoshi Kondo (Japan)
Television match official:
Yu Kawahara (Japan)
Foul play review officer:
Yosuke Kimura (Japan)

25 October 2025
14:50 JST (UTC+9)

Japan	15–19	Australia
Try: Takeuchi 51' m Gunter 60' c Con: Lee (1/2) 61'; Pen: Lee (1/1) 26'	Report	Try: Champion de Crespigny 12' c Flook 29' c Tizzano 56' m Con: Edmed (2/3) 13', 29'

Japan National Stadium, Tokyo
Attendance: 41,612
Referee: Ben O'Keeffe (New Zealand)

Team details

FB	15	Yoshitaka Yazaki
RW	14	Kippei Ishida
OC	13	Dylan Riley
IC	12	Shōgo Nakano		(substituted off) 8'	(substituted on) 30'	(substituted off) 49'
LW	11	Tomoki Osada
FH	10	Lee Seung-sin
SH	9	Shinobu Fujiwara		(substituted off) 71'
N8	8	Michael Leitch		(substituted off) 66'
OF	7	Kanji Shimokawa		(substituted off) 40'	(substituted on) 45'
BF	6	Ben Gunter		(substituted off) 71'
RL	5	Warner Dearns (c)
LL	4	Jack Cornelsen
TP	3	Shuhei Takeuchi	(yellow card) 36'			(substituted off) 65'
HK	2	Hayate Era		(substituted off) 71'
LP	1	Kenta Kobayashi		(substituted off) 71'
Replacements:
HK	16	Kenji Sato		(substituted on) 71'
PR	17	Ryosuke Iwaihara		(substituted on) 71'
PR	18	Keijiro Tamefusa		(substituted on) 40'	(substituted off) 45'	(substituted on) 65'
LK	19	Tyler Paul		(substituted on) 71'
LK	20	Tiennan Costley		(substituted on) 66'
SH	21	Kenta Fukuda		(substituted on) 71'
CE	22	Charlie Lawrence	(yellow card) 17'	(substituted on) 8'	(substituted off) 30'	(substituted on) 49'
FH	23	Sam Greene
Coach:
(Australia) Eddie Jones

FB	15	Andrew Kellaway
RW	14	Corey Toole
OC	13	Josh Flook
IC	12	Hunter Paisami
LW	11	Dylan Pietsch	(substituted off) 71'
FH	10	Tane Edmed	(substituted off) 71'
SH	9	Jake Gordon
N8	8	Rob Valetini
OF	7	Carlo Tizzano
BF	6	Nick Champion de Crespigny (c)
RL	5	Lukhan Salakaia-Loto	(substituted off) 6'
LL	4	Jeremy Williams
TP	3	Zane Nonggorr	(substituted off) 53'	(substituted on) 67'
HK	2	Josh Nasser	(substituted off) 51'
LP	1	Angus Bell	(substituted off) 57'
Replacements:
HK	16	Billy Pollard	(substituted on) 51'
PR	17	Aidan Ross	(substituted on) 57'
PR	18	Tom Robertson	(substituted on) 53'	(substituted off) 67'
LK	19	Josh Canham	(substituted on) 6'	(substituted off) 21'
N8	20	Harry Wilson		(substituted on) 21'
SH	21	Ryan Lonergan
CE	22	Hamish Stewart	(substituted on) 71'
WG	23	Filipo Daugunu	(substituted on) 71'
Coach:
(New Zealand) Joe Schmidt

Assistant referees:
Angus Mabey (New Zealand)
Morgan White (Hong Kong)
Television match official:
Richard Kelly (New Zealand)
Foul play review officer:
Matt Rodden (Hong Kong)

Notes:

- Tyler Paul (Japan) and Aidan Ross (Australia) made their international debuts.

=== 1 November ===
1 November 2025
13:15 GMT (UTC+0)

Barbarians	19–33	All Blacks XV
Try: Ntlabakanye 1' m Roos 19' c Mbonambi 26' c Con: Du Preez (2/3) 20', 27'	Report	Try: Tangitau (2) 38' c, 57' c Roe 49' m Preston 67' c Havili 72' c Con: Jacomb (4/5) 39', 58', 68', 73'

Brentford Community Stadium, London
Attendance: 11,525
Referee: Nic Berry (Australia)

Team details

FB	15	(England) Max Malins
RW	14	(South Africa) Werner Kok
OC	13	(Argentina) Matías Moroni	(substituted off) 67'
IC	12	(South Africa) Benhard Janse van Rensburg
LW	11	(South Africa) Leolin Zas	(substituted off) 65'
FH	10	(South Africa) Robert du Preez
SH	9	(Wales) Rhodri Williams	(substituted off) 63'
N8	8	(South Africa) Evan Roos
OF	7	(England) Fitz Harding	(substituted off) 72'
BF	6	(South Africa) Hanro Liebenberg (c)
RL	5	(South Africa) Ruben van Heerden	(substituted off) 56'
LL	4	(South Africa) Ernst van Rhyn
TP	3	(South Africa) Asenathi Ntlabakanye	(substituted off) 60'
HK	2	(South Africa) Bongi Mbonambi	(substituted off) 56'
LP	1	(Scotland) Oli Kebble	(substituted off) 46'
Replacements:
HK	16	(South Africa) Andre-Hugo Venter	(substituted on) 56'
PR	17	(South Africa) Ali Vermaak	(substituted on) 46'
PR	18	(Ireland) Jack Aungier	(substituted on) 60'
LK	19	(South Africa) Cobus Wiese	(substituted on) 56'
FL	20	(South Africa) Batho Hlekani	(substituted on) 72'
SH	21	(New Zealand) Brad Weber	(substituted on) 63'
CE	22	(South Africa) Dan du Plessis	(substituted on) 67'
FB	23	(South Africa) Rhyno Smith	(substituted on) 65'
Coach:
(Samoa) Pat Lam

FB	15	Jacob Ratumaitavuki-Kneepkens	(substituted off) 65'
RW	14	Caleb Tangitau
OC	13	Daniel Rona	(substituted off) 46'
IC	12	David Havili
LW	11	Etene Nanai-Seturo
FH	10	Josh Jacomb
SH	9	Xavier Roe	(substituted off) 60'
N8	8	Devan Flanders
OF	7	Dalton Papali'i (c)
BF	6	Kaylum Boshier	(substituted off) 49'
RL	5	Caleb Delany	(substituted off) 49'
LL	4	Josh Beehre
TP	3	George Dyer	(substituted off) 60'
HK	2	Jack Taylor	(substituted off) 60'
LP	1	Xavier Numia	(substituted off) 60'
Replacements:
HK	16	Bradley Slater	(substituted on) 60'
PR	17	Josh Fusitua	(substituted on) 60'
PR	18	Siale Lauaki	(substituted on) 60'
LK	19	Jamie Hannah	(substituted on) 49'
FL	20	Sean Withy	(substituted on) 49'
SH	21	Kyle Preston	(substituted on) 60'
FH	22	Rivez Reihana	(substituted on) 65'
CE	23	Braydon Ennor	(substituted on) 46'
Coach:
(New Zealand) Jamie Joseph

Player of the Match:
Etene Nanai-Seturo (All Blacks XV)

Assistant referees:
Anthony Woodthorpe (England)
Richard Gordon (England)
Television match official:
Christophe Ridley (England)

1 November 2025
15:10 GMT (UTC+0)

England	25–7	Australia
Try: Earl 20' c Pollock 58' m Mitchell 71' m Cowan-Dickie 74' m Con: Ford (1/3) 21'; Pen: Ford (1/1) 19'	Report	Try: Potter 33' c Con: Edmed (1/1) 34'

Twickenham Stadium, London
Attendance: 81,468
Referee: Nika Amashukeli (Georgia)

Team details

FB	15	Freddie Steward
RW	14	Tom Roebuck
OC	13	Tommy Freeman
IC	12	Fraser Dingwall
LW	11	Immanuel Feyi-Waboso
FH	10	George Ford		(substituted off) 72'
SH	9	Alex Mitchell		(substituted off) 72'
N8	8	Ben Earl		(substituted off) 51'
OF	7	Sam Underhill		(substituted off) 51'
BF	6	Guy Pepper
RL	5	Ollie Chessum		(substituted off) 72'
LL	4	Maro Itoje (c)
TP	3	Joe Heyes		(substituted off) 51'
HK	2	Jamie George		(substituted off) 51'
LP	1	Fin Baxter		(substituted off) 51'
Replacements:
HK	16	Luke Cowan-Dickie		(substituted on) 51'
PR	17	Ellis Genge		(substituted on) 51'
PR	18	Will Stuart		(substituted on) 51'
LK	19	Alex Coles		(substituted on) 72'
FL	20	Tom Curry		(substituted on) 51'
FL	21	Henry Pollock	(yellow card) 80+3'	(substituted on) 51'
SH	22	Ben Spencer		(substituted on) 72'
FH	23	Fin Smith		(substituted on) 72'
Coach:
(England) Steve Borthwick

FB	15	Andrew Kellaway
RW	14	Max Jorgensen	(substituted off) 67'
OC	13	Joseph Sua'ali'i
IC	12	Hunter Paisami
LW	11	Harry Potter
FH	10	Tane Edmed	(substituted off) 73'
SH	9	Jake Gordon	(substituted off) 67'
N8	8	Harry Wilson (c)
OF	7	Fraser McReight
BF	6	Rob Valetini	(substituted off) 59'
RL	5	Jeremy Williams	(substituted off) 67'
LL	4	Nick Frost
TP	3	Taniela Tupou	(substituted off) 45'
HK	2	Billy Pollard	(substituted off) 56'
LP	1	Angus Bell	(substituted off) 51'
Replacements:
HK	16	Josh Nasser	(substituted on) 56'
PR	17	Tom Robertson	(substituted on) 51'
PR	18	Allan Alaalatoa	(substituted on) 45'
LK	19	Lukhan Salakaia-Loto	(substituted on) 67'
FL	20	Nick Champion de Crespigny	(substituted on) 59'
SH	21	Ryan Lonergan	(substituted on) 67'
CE	22	Hamish Stewart	(substituted on) 73'
WG	23	Filipo Daugunu	(substituted on) 67'
Coach:
(New Zealand) Joe Schmidt

Player of the Match:
Ben Earl (England)

Assistant referees:
James Doleman (New Zealand)
Craig Evans (Wales)
Television match official:
Eric Gauzins (France)
Foul play review officer:
Matteo Liperini (Italy)

Notes:

- Luke Cowan-Dickie earned his 50th international cap for England.
- England regained the Ella–Mobbs Trophy

1 November 2025
16:10 GMT (UTC+0)

South Africa	61–7	Japan
Try: Kolisi 3' c Feinberg-Mngomezulu (2) 12' c, 18' m Penalty try 35'; Louw 46' c Arendse (2) 57' c, 66' c Esterhuizen 62' c Kriel 78' c Con: Feinberg-Mngomezulu (3/4) 4', 13', 47'; Libbok (4/4) 58', 63', 67', 79'; Pen: Feinberg-Mngomezulu (1/1) 17'	Report	Try: Yazaki 51' c Con: Lee (1/1) 52'

Wembley Stadium, London, England
Attendance: 23,243
Referee: Eoghan Cross (Ireland)

Team details

FB	15	Cheslin Kolbe
RW	14	Ethan Hooker		(substituted off) 71'
OC	13	Jesse Kriel
IC	12	Damian de Allende
LW	11	Kurt-Lee Arendse
FH	10	Sacha Feinberg-Mngomezulu	(substituted off) 52'
SH	9	Cobus Reinach	(substituted off) 52'	(substituted on) 71'
N8	8	Jasper Wiese	(substituted on) 44'
BF	7	Franco Mostert
OF	6	Siya Kolisi (c)	(substituted off) 44'
RL	5	Lood de Jager
LL	4	RG Snyman	(substituted off) 71'
TP	3	Zachary Porthen	(substituted off) 44'
HK	2	Malcolm Marx	(substituted off) 44'
LP	1	Ox Nché	(substituted off) 18'
Replacements:
HK	16	Johan Grobbelaar	(substituted on) 44'
PR	17	Gerhard Steenekamp	(substituted on) 18'
PR	18	Wilco Louw	(substituted on) 44'
LK	19	Ruan Nortjé	(substituted on) 71'
CE	20	André Esterhuizen	(substituted on) 44'
FL	21	Kwagga Smith	(substituted on) 44'
SH	22	Grant Williams	(substituted on) 52'
FH	23	Manie Libbok	(substituted on) 52'
Coach:
(South Africa) Rassie Erasmus

FB	15	Yoshitaka Yazaki
RW	14	Kippei Ishida
OC	13	Dylan Riley
IC	12	Charlie Lawrence
LW	11	Tomoki Osada		(substituted off) 55'
FH	10	Lee Seung-sin		(substituted off) 72'
SH	9	Shinobu Fujiwara		(substituted off) 65'
N8	8	Michael Leitch		(substituted off) 48'
OF	7	Kanji Shimokawa		(substituted off) 63'
BF	6	Ben Gunter	(yellow card) 42'
RL	5	Warner Dearns (c)
LL	4	Jack Cornelsen
TP	3	Shuhei Takeuchi	(yellow card) 35'	(substituted off) 63'
HK	2	Kenji Sato		(substituted off) 65'
LP	1	Kenta Kobayashi		(substituted off) 63'
Replacements:
HK	16	Shodai Hirao		(substituted on) 65'
PR	17	Ryosuke Iwaihara		(substituted on) 63'
PR	18	Keijiro Tamefusa		(substituted on) 63'
LK	19	Tyler Paul		(substituted on) 63'
FL	20	Faulua Makisi		(substituted on) 48'
SH	21	Kenta Fukuda		(substituted on) 65'
FH	22	Sam Greene		(substituted on) 72'
FL	23	Tiennan Costley		(substituted on) 55'
Coach:
(Australia) Eddie Jones

Player of the Match:
Sacha Feinberg-Mngomezulu (South Africa)

Assistant referees:
Ben O'Keeffe (New Zealand)
Adam Leal (England)
Television match official:
Mike Adamson (Scotland)
Foul play review officer:
Tual Trainini (France)

Notes:

- Zachary Porthen (South Africa) and Shodai Hirao (Japan) made their international debuts.
- This was South Africa' biggest winning margin over Japan.

1 November 2025
17:00 WET (UTC+0)

Munster (Ireland)	31–28	Argentina XV
Try: O'Connell 23' m Butler (2) 34' m, 54' c Coombes 49' c O'Brien 68' c Con: Butler (3/5) 50', 55', 69'	Report	Try: Valarolo 19' c Oviedo 50' c Pernas 62' c Wade 80' c Con: Hernández (3/3) 20', 51', 63'; Farisé (1/1) 80+1'

Thomond Park, Munster
Attendance: 15,054
Referee: Angus Gardner (Australia)

1 November 2025
17:40 GMT (UTC+0)

Scotland	85–0	United States
Try: Richardson 5' c Van der Merwe (2) 7' c, 24' m Graham (3) 10' c, 36' m, 44' m Dobie (3) 20' c, 27' c, 78' c Rowe 57' c McDowall 71' c Horne 73' c Smith 80+1' c Con: Hastings (5/7) 6', 8', 11', 22', 28'; Horne (5/5) 58', 72', 74', 79', 80+2'	Report

Murrayfield Stadium, Edinburgh
Attendance: 56,589
Referee: Damian Schneider (Argentina)

Team details

FB	15	Kyle Rowe
RW	14	Darcy Graham	(substituted off) 50'
OC	13	Ollie Smith
IC	12	Stafford McDowall (c)
LW	11	Duhan van der Merwe
FH	10	Adam Hastings	(substituted off) 40'
SH	9	Jamie Dobie
N8	8	Jack Dempsey	(substituted off) 40'
OF	7	Dylan Richardson
BF	6	Liam McConnell
RL	5	Marshall Sykes	(substituted off) 50'
LL	4	Scott Cummings	(substituted off) 40'
TP	3	D'Arcy Rae	(substituted off) 40'
HK	2	Patrick Harrison	(substituted off) 61'
LP	1	Rory Sutherland	(substituted off) 40'
Replacements:
HK	16	Harri Morris	(substituted on) 61'
PR	17	Nathan McBeth	(substituted on) 40'
PR	18	Murphy Walker	(substituted on) 40'
LK	19	Alex Samuel	(substituted on) 40'
LK	20	Max Williamson	(substituted on) 50'
N8	21	Magnus Bradbury	(substituted on) 40'
SH	22	George Horne	(substituted on) 50'
FH	23	Ross Thompson	(substituted on) 40'
Coach:
(Scotland) Gregor Townsend

FB	15	Erich Storti	(substituted off) 29'
RW	14	Mitch Wilson
OC	13	Dominic Besag	(substituted off) 71'
IC	12	Tommaso Boni
LW	11	Toby Fricker
FH	10	Christopher Hilsenbeck	(substituted off) 53'
SH	9	Ruben de Haas
N8	8	Paddy Ryan
OF	7	Cory Daniel	(substituted off) 46'
BF	6	Vili Helu	(substituted off) 67'
RL	5	Jason Damm (c)
LL	4	Marno Redelinghuys
TP	3	Pono Davis	(substituted off) 55'
HK	2	Kaleb Geiger	(substituted off) 32'
LP	1	Ezekiel Lindenmuth	(substituted off) 46'
Replacements:
HK	16	Sean McNulty	(substituted on) 32'
PR	17	Payton Talea	(substituted on) 46'
PR	18	Maliu Niuafe	(substituted on) 55'
LK	19	Tevita Naqali	(substituted on) 71'
FL	20	Makeen Alikhan	(substituted on) 46'
SH	21	Ethan McVeigh	(substituted on) 67'
CE	22	Tavite Lopeti	(substituted on) 29'
FH	23	Luke Carty	(substituted on) 53'
Coach:
(United States) Scott Lawrence

Player of the Match:
Jamie Dobie (Scotland)

Assistant referees:
Gianluca Gnecchi (Italy)
Katsuki Furuse (Japan)
Television match official:
Leo Colgan (Ireland)
Foul play review officer:
Olly Hodges (Ireland)

Notes:

- Liam McConnell and Harri Morris (both Scotland) made their international debuts.
- Duhan van der Merwe earned his 50th international cap for Scotland.
- This was Scotland's biggest test score obtained at Murrayfield Stadium and their biggest win against the United States.

1 November 2025
15:10 CDT (UTC-5)

Ireland	13–26	New Zealand
Try: Furlong 16' c Con: Crowley (1/1) 17'; Pen: Crowley (2/3) 7', 51'	Report	Try: Savea 19' c Williams 62' c Sititi 67' c Roigard 77' m Con: Barrett (3/4) 20', 63', 67'

Soldier Field, Chicago, United States
Attendance: 61,841
Referee: Pierre Brousset (France)

Team details

FB	15	Jamie Osborne
RW	14	Tommy O'Brien
OC	13	Garry Ringrose
IC	12	Stuart McCloskey		(substituted off) 57'
LW	11	James Lowe
FH	10	Jack Crowley		(substituted off) 68'
SH	9	Jamison Gibson-Park		(substituted off) 68'
N8	8	Jack Conan				(substituted off) 52'
OF	7	Josh van der Flier
BF	6	Ryan Baird
RL	5	Tadhg Beirne	(red card) 3'
LL	4	James Ryan		(substituted off) 33'	(substituted on) 40'
TP	3	Tadhg Furlong		(substituted off) 61'
HK	2	Dan Sheehan (c)		(substituted off) 61'
LP	1	Andrew Porter		(substituted off) 68'
Replacements:
HK	16	Rónan Kelleher		(substituted on) 61'
PR	17	Paddy McCarthy		(substituted on) 68'
PR	18	Finlay Bealham		(substituted on) 61'
LK	19	Iain Henderson		(substituted on) 24'
N8	20	Caelan Doris		(substituted on) 33'	(substituted off) 40'	(substituted on) 52'
SH	21	Craig Casey		(substituted on) 68'
FH	22	Sam Prendergast		(substituted on) 68'
CE	23	Bundee Aki		(substituted on) 57'
Coach:
(England) Andy Farrell

FB	15	Will Jordan
RW	14	Leroy Carter	(substituted off) 65'
OC	13	Quinn Tupaea
IC	12	Jordie Barrett	(substituted off) 16'
LW	11	Caleb Clarke
FH	10	Beauden Barrett
SH	9	Cam Roigard	(substituted off) 78'
N8	8	Peter Lakai
OF	7	Ardie Savea (c)
BF	6	Simon Parker	(substituted off) 30'	(substituted on) 40'	(substituted off) 60'
RL	5	Fabian Holland
LL	4	Scott Barrett	(substituted off) 3'
TP	3	Fletcher Newell	(substituted off) 63'
HK	2	Codie Taylor	(substituted off) 63'
LP	1	Ethan de Groot	(substituted off) 49'
Replacements:
HK	16	Samisoni Taukei'aho	(substituted on) 63'
PR	17	Tamaiti Williams	(substituted on) 49'
PR	18	Pasilio Tosi	(substituted on) 63'
LK	19	Josh Lord	(substituted on) 3'
FL	20	Wallace Sititi	(substituted on) 30'	(substituted off) 40'	(substituted on) 60'
SH	21	Cortez Ratima	(substituted on) 78'
WG	22	Leicester Faingaʻanuku	(substituted on) 16'
FB	23	Damian McKenzie	(substituted on) 65'
Coach:
(New Zealand) Scott Robertson

Player of the Match:
Fabian Holland (New Zealand)

Assistant referees:
Karl Dickson (England)
Luc Ramos (France)
Television match official:
Ian Tempest (England)
Foul play review officer:
Dan Jones (England)

=== 5 November ===
5 November 2025
19:45 GMT (UTC+0)

UK Armed Forces XV	24–29	Germany
	Report

Kingsholm Stadium, Gloucester
Referee: Capt. Iain Kiy (Army / England)

=== 7/8/9 November ===
7 November 2025
19:45 GMT (UTC+0)

Bristol Bears (England)	14–38	Argentina XV
Try: Worsnip 28' c Harris 72' c Con: Protheroe (2/2) 29', 73'	Report	Try: Pérez 16' c Wade (2) 23' c, 80+2' m Oviedo 45' m Medrano 65' c Pregot 68' c Con: Hernández (2/3) 17', 24'; Farise (2/3) 66', 69'

Ashton Gate Stadium, Bristol
Referee: Sara Cox (England)

8 November 2025
16:30 HKT (UTC+8)

Hong Kong	31–63	(Australia) Brumbies
Try: Ramage (3) 6' c, 70' m, 78' m McNutt (2) 26' c, 35' c Con: McNeish (3/5) 7', 27', 36'	Report	Try: Mickelson (2) 19' c, 39' c Taii-Tualima 22' c Nelson 44' c Pritchard 52' c Meredith 61' c Wilcox (3) 66' c, 72' c, 80' c Con: Meredith (9/9) 20', 23', 40', 45', 53', 62', 67', 73', 80'

Hong Kong Football Club Stadium, Happy Valley
Referee: Matt Rodden (Hong Kong)

8 November 2025
16:00 GST (UTC+4)

Georgia	43–30	United States
Try: Kvatadze 1' c Kveseladze (2) 20' c, 32' c Gorgadze 28' m Japaridze 64' c Aprasidze 79' c Con: Abzhandadze (5/6) 2', 21', 33', 65', 80+1'; Pen: Abzhandadze (1/1) 72'	Report	Try: Besag (2) 7' c, 17' c Fricker 14' c Con: Carty (3/3) 7', 15', 18'; Pen: Carty (2/2) 40', 77'; Drop: Carty (1/1) 50'

Adjarabet Arena, Batumi
Referee: Luke Pearce (England)

Team details

FB	15	Davit Niniashvili
RW	14	Aka Tabutsadze	(substituted off) 74'
OC	13	Giorgi Kveseladze
IC	12	Tornike Kakhoidze
LW	11	Georges Shvelidze
FH	10	Tedo Abzhandadze
SH	9	Vasil Lobzhanidze	(substituted off) 66'
N8	8	Beka Gorgadze (c)
OF	7	Beka Saghinadze
BF	6	Luka Ivanishvili	(substituted off) 54'
RL	5	Lado Chachanidze	(substituted off) 71'
LL	4	Mikheil Babunashvili
TP	3	Beka Gigashvili	(substituted off) 51'
HK	2	Irakli Kvatadze	(substituted off) 51'
LP	1	Davit Abdushelishvili	(substituted off) 51'
Replacements:
HK	16	Vano Karkadze	(substituted on) 51'
PR	17	Giorgi Tetrashvili	(substituted on) 51'
PR	18	Luka Japaridze	(substituted on) 51'
LK	19	Demur Epremidze	(substituted on) 71'
FL	20	Ilia Spanderashvili	(substituted on) 54'
SH	21	Gela Aprasidze	(substituted on) 66'
FH	22	Luka Matkava
CE	23	Demur Tapladze	(substituted on) 74'
Coach:
(England) Richard Cockerill

FB	15	Toby Fricker
RW	14	Mark O'Keeffe	(yellow card) 25'
OC	13	Dominic Besag
IC	12	Tavite Lopeti
LW	11	Rufus McLean
FH	10	Luke Carty
SH	9	Ruben de Haas		(substituted off) 69'
N8	8	Makeen Alikhan
OF	7	Paddy Ryan		(substituted off) 66'
BF	6	Marno Redelinghuys		(substituted off) 51'
RL	5	Jason Damm (c)		(substituted off) 71'
LL	4	Tevita Naqali		(substituted off) 51'
TP	3	Pono Davis		(substituted off) 41'
HK	2	Kaleb Geiger		(substituted off) 61'
LP	1	Ezekiel Lindenmuth		(substituted off) 44'
Replacements:
HK	16	Mike Sosene-Feagai		(substituted on) 61'
PR	17	Payton Talea		(substituted on) 44'
PR	18	Tonga Kofe		(substituted on) 41'
LK	19	Brandon Harvey		(substituted on) 51'
FL	20	Nafi Ma'afu		(substituted on) 66'
LK	21	Vili Helu		(substituted on) 51'
FL	22	Christian Poidevin		(substituted on) 71'
SH	23	Michael Baska		(substituted on) 69'
Coach:
(United States) Scott Lawrence

Assistant referees:
Adam Leal (England)
George Selwood (England)
Television match official:
Dan Jones (England)

Notes:

- Davit Abdushelishvili (Georgia), Brandon Harvey and Nafi Ma'afu (both United States) made their international debuts.
- Beka Gorgadze (Georgia) earned his 50th test cap.

8 November 2025
12:40 WET (UTC+0)

Ireland	41–10	Japan
Try: Crowley 19' c Timoney 29' c Porter 47' m G. McCarthy 66' m P. McCarthy 71' c T. O'Brien 75' c Con: Crowley (2/3) 20', 30'; S. Prendergast (2/3) 72', 76'; Pen: Crowley (1/1) 5'	Report	Try: Sato 36' c Con: Lee (1/1) 37'; Pen: Lee (1/1) 40+3'

Aviva Stadium, Dublin
Attendance: 50,060
Referee: Gianluca Gnecchi (Italy)

Team details

FB	15	Jamie Osborne		(substituted off) 66'
RW	14	Tommy O'Brien
OC	13	Tom Farrell
IC	12	Robbie Henshaw
LW	11	Jacob Stockdale	(yellow card) 40'
FH	10	Jack Crowley		(substituted off) 52'
SH	9	Craig Casey
N8	8	Caelan Doris (c)
OF	7	Nick Timoney		(substituted off) 52'
BF	6	Ryan Baird
RL	5	Tadhg Beirne
LL	4	James Ryan		(substituted off) 52'
TP	3	Thomas Clarkson		(substituted off) 58'
HK	2	Rónan Kelleher		(substituted off) 58'
LP	1	Andrew Porter		(substituted off) 68'
Replacements:
HK	16	Gus McCarthy		(substituted on) 58'
PR	17	Paddy McCarthy		(substituted on) 68'
PR	18	Finlay Bealham		(substituted on) 58'
LK	19	Cian Prendergast		(substituted on) 52'
N8	20	Jack Conan		(substituted on) 52'
SH	21	Caolin Blade		(substituted on) 62'
FH	22	Sam Prendergast		(substituted on) 52'
FB	23	Jimmy O'Brien		(substituted on) 66'
Coach:
(England) Andy Farrell

FB	15	Yoshitaka Yazaki
RW	14	Kippei Ishida
OC	13	Dylan Riley
IC	12	Charlie Lawrence	(yellow card) 17'	(substituted off) 66'
LW	11	Tomoki Osada
FH	10	Lee Seung-sin		(substituted off) 58'
SH	9	Naoto Saitō		(substituted off) 58'
N8	8	Faulua Makisi			(substituted off) 58'
OF	7	Kanji Shimokawa
BF	6	Ben Gunter		(substituted off) 49'	(substituted on) 58'
RL	5	Warner Dearns (c)
LL	4	Epineri Uluiviti		(substituted off) 55'
TP	3	Shuhei Takeuchi		(substituted off) 58'
HK	2	Kenji Sato		(substituted off) 68'
LP	1	Kenta Kobayashi		(substituted off) 52'
Replacements:
HK	16	Shodai Hirao		(substituted on) 68'
PR	17	Ryosuke Iwaihara		(substituted on) 52'
PR	18	Keijiro Tamefusa		(substituted on) 58'
LK	19	Jack Cornelsen		(substituted on) 55'
FL	20	Michael Leitch		(substituted on) 49'
SH	21	Shinobu Fujiwara		(substituted on) 58'
FH	22	Shinya Komura		(substituted on) 58'
CE	23	Yuya Hirose		(substituted on) 66'
Coach:
(Australia) Eddie Jones

Player of the Match:
Tommy O'Brien (Ireland)

Assistant referees:
Andrea Piardi (Italy)
Federico Vedovelli (Italy)
Television match official:
Matteo Liperini (Italy)
Foul play review officer:
Eric Gauzins (France)

Notes:

- Tom Farrell (Ireland) and Shinya Komura (Japan) made their international debuts.

8 November 2025
13:15 GMT (UTC+0)

England A	14–31	All Blacks XV
Try: Hodge 27' c Batley 78' c Con: Hodge (2/2) 28', 79'	Report	Try: Tangitau 12' m Hannah 25' c Jacomb 53' c Reihana 63' c Fakatava 77' m Con: Jacomb (3/5) 25', 54', 64'

The Rec, Bath
Attendance: 14,509
Referee: Jérémy Rozier (France)

Team details

FB	15	Josh Hodge
RW	14	Noah Caluori
OC	13	Angus Hall
IC	12	Max Ojomoh
LW	11	Ollie Hassell-Collins	(substituted off) 60'
FH	10	Charlie Atkinson	(substituted off) 68'
SH	9	Archie McParland	(substituted off) 50'
N8	8	Greg Fisilau	(substituted off) 63'
OF	7	Tom Pearson
BF	6	Ethan Roots (c)
RL	5	Joe Batley
LL	4	Tom Lockett	(substituted off) 60'
TP	3	Afolabi Fasogbon	(substituted off) 56'
HK	2	Jamie Blamire	(substituted off) 68'
LP	1	Emmanuel Iyogun	(substituted off) 68'
Replacements:
HK	16	Kepu Tuipulotu	(substituted on) 68'
PR	17	Tarek Haffar	(substituted on) 68'
PR	18	Billy Sela	(substituted on) 56'
LK	19	Ben Bamber	(substituted on) 60'
FL	20	Fitz Harding	(substituted on) 63'
SH	21	Caolan Englefield	(substituted on) 50'
CE	22	Rekeiti Ma'asi-White	(substituted on) 68'
WG	23	Adam Radwan	(substituted on) 60'
Coach:
(England) Mark Mapletoft

FB	15	Chay Fihaki	(substituted off) 60'
RW	14	Caleb Tangitau
OC	13	Braydon Ennor
IC	12	David Havili	(substituted off) 68'
LW	11	Sevu Reece
FH	10	Josh Jacomb
SH	9	Kyle Preston	(substituted off) 50'
N8	8	Christian Lio-Willie	(substituted off) 40'	(substituted on) 70'
OF	7	Dalton Papali'i (c)
BF	6	Devan Flanders
RL	5	Jamie Hannah	(substituted off) 53'
LL	4	TK Howden
TP	3	George Dyer	(substituted off) 68'
HK	2	Brodie McAlister	(substituted off) 63'
LP	1	Xavier Numia	(substituted off) 48'
Replacements:
HK	16	Jack Taylor	(substituted on) 63'
PR	17	Josh Fusitua	(substituted on) 48'
PR	18	Siale Lauaki	(substituted on) 68'
LK	19	Josh Beehre	(substituted on) 53'
N8	20	Luke Jacobson	(substituted on) 40'	(substituted off) 70'
SH	21	Folau Fakatava	(substituted on) 50'
FH	22	Rivez Reihana	(substituted on) 60'
CE	23	Dallas McLeod	(substituted on) 68'
Coach:
(New Zealand) Jamie Joseph

Player of the Match:
Braydon Ennor (All Blaccks XV)

Assistant referees:
Hamish Grant (England)
Calum Howard (England)
Television match official:
Stuart Terheege (England)

8 November 2025
15:00 WET (UTC+0)

Portugal	8–26	Uruguay
Try: Marta 27' m Pen: Marques (1/1) 41'	Report	Try: F. Suárez 53' c Ardao 61' m Basso 75' m Con: Álvarez (1/2) 54'; Pen: Álvarez (3/3) 21', 48', 70'

Estádio Nacional, Lisbon
Referee: James Doleman (New Zealand)

Team details

FB	15	Nuno Sousa Guedes
RW	14	Raffaele Storti
OC	13	Rodrigo Marta
IC	12	Tomás Appleton (c)		(substituted off) 56'
LW	11	Vincent Pinto
FH	10	Hugo Aubry		(substituted off) 62'
SH	9	Samuel Marques		(substituted off) 77'
N8	8	David Wallis
OF	7	Nicolas Martins		(substituted off) 62'
BF	6	Francisco Almeida			(substituted off) 64'
RL	5	Pedro Ferreira		(substituted off) 58'
LL	4	Guilherme Costa
TP	3	Abel da Cunha		(substituted off) 40'
HK	2	Luka Begic		(substituted off) 40'	(substituted on) 64'
LP	1	Cody Thomas		(substituted off) 40'
Replacements:
PR	16	David Costa		(substituted on) 40'
HK	17	Pedro Santiago Lopes	(red card) 55'	(substituted on) 40'
PR	18	Anthony Alves		(substituted on) 40'
LK	19	Duarte Torgal		(substituted on) 58'
FL	20	Vasco Baptista		(substituted on) 62'
SH	21	Tomas Amado		(substituted on) 77'
CE	22	Guilherme Vasconcelos		(substituted on) 56'
FB	23	Simão Bento		(substituted on) 62'
Coach:
(New Zealand) Simon Mannix

FB	15	Juan Gonzalez		(substituted off) 72'
RW	14	Bautista Basso
OC	13	Justo Ferrario		(substituted off) 52'
IC	12	Andrés Vilaseca		(substituted off) 57'	(substituted on) 72'
LW	11	Juan Manuel Alonso
FH	10	Felipe Etcheverry
SH	9	Santiago Álvarez			(substituted off) 72'
N8	8	Carlos Deus		(substituted off) 72'
OF	7	Lucas Bianchi
BF	6	Manuel Ardao	(yellow card) 41'
RL	5	Manuel Leindekar (c)		(substituted off) 12'
LL	4	Felipe Aliaga
TP	3	Reinaldo Piussi		(substituted off) 46'
HK	2	Germán Kessler		(substituted off) 63'
LP	1	Mateo Perillo		(substituted off) 46'
Replacements:
HK	16	Joaquín Myszka		(substituted on) 63'
PR	17	Francisco Suárez		(substituted on) 46'
PR	18	Ignacio Péculo		(substituted on) 46'
FL	19	Santiago Civetta		(substituted on) 72'
FL	20	Manuel Diana		(substituted on) 12'
CE	21	Joaquín Suárez		(substituted on) 52'
FH	22	Jean Cotarmanac'h		(substituted on) 72'
FB	23	Francisco Gonzalez Capdevila		(substituted on) 57'
Coach:
(Argentina) Rodolfo Ambrosio

Assistant referees:
Kevin Bralley (France)
Evan Urruzmendi (France)
Television match official:
Tual Trainini (France)

Notes:

- Tomas Amado, Guilherme Vasconcelos (both Portugal), Jean Cotarmanac'h, Justo Ferrario and Francisco Gonzalez Capdevila (both Uruguay) made their international debuts.

8 November 2025
17:00 EET (UTC+2)

Romania	31–21	Canada
Try: Cojocaru 41' c Chirică 55' m Manumua 72' c Con: Conache (2/3) 43', 74'; Pen: Conache (4/4) 2', 8', 14', 24'	Report	Try: Flesch 28' c von Dadelszen 66' c Waddell 80+2' c Con: Nelson (3/3) 29', 67', 80+3'

Stadionul Arcul de Triumf, Bucharest
Referee: Ben Breakspear (Wales)

Team details

FB	15	Gabriel Pop
RW	14	Iliesa Tiqe
OC	13	Atila Septar	(substituted off) 60'
IC	12	Jason Tomane	(substituted off) 68'
LW	11	Tevita Manumua
FH	10	Hinckley Vaovasa
SH	9	Alin Conache	(substituted off) 74'
N8	8	Cristi Chirică	(substituted off) 67'
OF	7	Kemal Altinok
BF	6	Cristi Boboc
RL	5	Andrei Mahu
LL	4	Nicolaas Immelman
TP	3	Cosmin Manole	(substituted off) 50'
HK	2	Ovidiu Cojocaru (c)	(substituted off) 51'
LP	1	Alexandru Savin	(substituted off) 51'
Replacements:
PR	16	Ștefan Buruiană	(substituted on) 51'
HK	17	Iulian Harțig	(substituted on) 51'
PR	18	Gheorghe Gajion	(substituted on) 50'
LK	19	Matthew Tweddle	(substituted on) 67'
FL	20	Vlad Neculau	(substituted on) 67'
SH	21	Gabriel Rupanu	(substituted on) 74'
CE	22	Mihai Graure	(substituted on) 60'
FB	23	Paul Popoaia	(substituted on) 68'
Coach:
(France) David Gérard

FB	15	Peter Nelson
RW	14	Josiah Morra			(substituted off) 71'
OC	13	Spencer Jones
IC	12	Kyle Tremblay		(substituted off) 52'
LW	11	Nic Benn
FH	10	Robbie Povey	(yellow card) 51'
SH	9	Brock Gallagher		(substituted off) 40'
N8	8	Matthew Oworu		(substituted off) 74'
OF	7	Lucas Rumball (c)
BF	6	Mason Flesch
RL	5	Izzak Kelly		(substituted off) 64'
LL	4	Piers von Dadelszen
TP	3	Cole Keith		(substituted off) 40'	(substituted on) 71'	(substituted off) 80'
HK	2	Dewald Kotze		(substituted off) 74'
LP	1	Sam Miller		(substituted off) 56'
Replacements:
HK	16	Austin Creighton		(substituted on) 74'
PR	17	Emerson Prior		(substituted on) 56'
PR	18	Matt Tierney	(yellow card) 70'	(substituted on) 40'
LK	19	Barnaby Waddell		(substituted on) 64'
FL	20	Sion Parry		(substituted on) 74'
SH	21	Jason Higgins		(substituted on) 40'
CE	22	Noah Flesch		(substituted on) 52'
WG	23	Jack Shaw				(substituted on) 80'
Coach:
(Australia) Steve Meehan

Assistant referees:
Adam Jones (Wales)
Ben Connor (Wales)
Television match official:
Aled Griffiths (Wales)

Notes:

- Iliesa Tiqe (Romania) and Barnaby Waddell (Canada) made their international debuts.

8 November 2025
15:10 GMT (UTC+0)

Scotland	17–25	New Zealand
Try: Ashman 45' c Steyn 50' c Con: Russell (2/2) 46', 51'; Pen: Russell (1/1) 59'	Report	Try: Roigard 2' c Jordan 39' c McKenzie 73' m Con: Barrett (2/2) 3', 40'; Pen: Barrett (1/1) 28'; McKenzie (1/1) 78'

Murrayfield Stadium, Edinburgh
Attendance: 67,144
Referee: Nic Berry (Australia)

Team details

FB	15	Blair Kinghorn
RW	14	Darcy Graham
OC	13	Rory Hutchinson
IC	12	Sione Tuipulotu (c)
LW	11	Kyle Steyn
FH	10	Finn Russell	(substituted off) 75'
SH	9	Ben White	(substituted off) 55'
N8	8	Jack Dempsey	(substituted off) 66'
OF	7	Matt Fagerson	(substituted off) 61'
BF	6	Gregor Brown
RL	5	Grant Gilchrist	(substituted off) 65'
LL	4	Scott Cummings
TP	3	D'Arcy Rae	(substituted off) 55'
HK	2	Ewan Ashman	(substituted off) 55'
LP	1	Pierre Schoeman	(substituted off) 55'	(substituted on) 68'	(substituted off) 78'
Replacements:
HK	16	George Turner	(substituted on) 55'
PR	17	Rory Sutherland	(substituted on) 55'	(substituted off) 68'	(substituted on) 78'
PR	18	Elliot Millar Mills	(substituted on) 55'
LK	19	Marshall Sykes	(substituted on) 65'
FL	20	Rory Darge	(substituted on) 61'
FL	21	Josh Bayliss	(substituted on) 66'
SH	22	Jamie Dobie	(substituted on) 55'
FH	23	Tom Jordan	(substituted on) 75'
Coach:
(Scotland) Gregor Townsend

FB	15	Will Jordan
RW	14	Leroy Carter	(yellow card) 33'	(substituted off) 66'
OC	13	Leicester Faingaʻanuku
IC	12	Quinn Tupaea
LW	11	Caleb Clarke		(substituted off) 45'
FH	10	Beauden Barrett
SH	9	Cam Roigard
N8	8	Peter Lakai
OF	7	Ardie Savea (c)	(yellow card) 45'
BF	6	Wallace Sititi	(yellow card) 61'	(substituted off) 72'
RL	5	Fabian Holland
LL	4	Josh Lord		(substituted off) 60'
TP	3	Fletcher Newell		(substituted off) 55'
HK	2	Codie Taylor		(substituted off) 57'
LP	1	Ethan de Groot		(substituted off) 28'	(substituted on) 39'	(substituted off) 52'
Replacements:
HK	16	Samisoni Taukei'aho		(substituted on) 57'
PR	17	Tamaiti Williams		(substituted on) 28'	(substituted off) 39'	(substituted on) 52'
PR	18	Pasilio Tosi		(substituted on) 55'
LK	19	Sam Darry		(substituted on) 60'
FL	20	Du'Plessis Kirifi		(substituted on) 72'
SH	21	Cortez Ratima
CE	22	Billy Proctor		(substituted on) 66'
FH	23	Damian McKenzie		(substituted on) 45'
Coach:
(New Zealand) Scott Robertson

Player of the Match:
Damian McKenzie (New Zealand)

Assistant referees:
Pierre Brousset (France)
Morné Ferreira (South Africa)
Television match official:
Marius van der Westhuizen (South Africa)
Foul play review officer:
Marius Jonker (South Africa)

8 November 2025
17:00 CET (UTC+1)

Spain	24–61	Ireland A
Try: Boronat (2) 13' m, 33' m Imaz 48' c, 80' c Con: López-Bontempo (2/4) 49', 80+1'	Report	Try: Murray 9' c Milne 18' c Postlethwaite 22' c Baloucoune (2) 27' c, 35' c Boyle 39' c Murphy 42' c Bolton 51' m Wilson 66' c Con: Byrne (8/9) 10', 19', 23', 28', 36', 40', 43', 67'

Butarque Stadium, Leganés
Attendance: 11,236
Referee: Tomás Bertazza (Argentina)

Team details

FB	15	J. W. Bell
RW	14	Martiniano Cian
OC	13	Iñaki Mateu	(yellow card) 38'
IC	12	Gonzalo López-Bontempo
LW	11	Alberto Carmona
FH	10	Gonzalo Vinuesa		(substituted off) 50'
SH	9	Estanislao Bay		(substituted off) 64'
N8	8	Ekain Imaz
OF	7	Vicente Boronat		(substituted off) 50'
BF	6	Manex Ariceta		(substituted off) 44'
RL	5	Ignacio Piñeiro
LL	4	Matthew Foulds		(substituted off) 66'
TP	3	Jon Zabala (c)		(substituted off) 62'
HK	2	Santiago Ovejero		(substituted off) 45'
LP	1	Thierry Futeu		(substituted off) 67'
Replacements:
HK	16	Álvaro García		(substituted on) 45'
PR	17	Raúl Calzón		(substituted on) 67'
PR	18	Joaquín Domínguez		(substituted on) 62'
LK	19	Imanol Urraza		(substituted on) 66'
FL	20	Matheo Triki		(substituted on) 50'
SH	21	Nicolás Infer		(substituted on) 64'
FL	22	Alex Saleta		(substituted on) 44'
FH	23	Lucien Richardis		(substituted on) 50'
Coach:
(Argentina) Pablo Bouza

FB	15	Michael Lowry	(substituted off) 38'
RW	14	Robert Baloucoune
OC	13	Jude Postlethwaite
IC	12	Dan Kelly	(substituted off) 58'
LW	11	Shayne Bolton
FH	10	Harry Byrne
SH	9	Ben Murphy	(substituted off) 58'
N8	8	Paul Boyle
OF	7	Ruadhán Quinn	(substituted off) 64'
BF	6	Alex Soroka	(substituted off) 57'
RL	5	Darragh Murray
LL	4	Evan O’Connell	(substituted off) 53'
TP	3	Tom O'Toole	(substituted off) 66'
HK	2	Tom Stewart (c)
LP	1	Michael Milne	(substituted off) 53'
Replacements:
HK	16	Lee Barron	(substituted on) 64'
PR	17	Alex Usanov	(substituted on) 53'
PR	18	Scott Wilson	(substituted on) 66'
LK	19	Diarmuid Mangan	(substituted on) 53'
FL	20	David McCann	(substituted on) 57'
SH	21	Nathan Doak	(substituted on) 58'
CE	22	Cathal Forde	(substituted on) 58'
WG	23	Zac Ward	(substituted on) 38'
Coach:
(Ireland) Cullie Tucker

Assistant referees:
Morgan White (Hong Kong)
Ignacio Muñoz Martin (Spain)
Television match official:
Paulo Duarte (Portugal)

Notes:

- Nicolás Infer (Spain) made his international debut.

8 November 2025
17:40 GMT (UTC+0)

England	38–18	Fiji
Try: Cowan-Dickie 5' c Feyi-Waboso 37' c Genge 48' c George 59' m Arundell 68' m Itoje 73' c Con: F. Smith (4/6) 6', 38', 49', 74'	Report	Try: Ikanivere (2) 9' m, 51' m Muntz 21' m Pen: Muntz (1/1) 28'

Twickenham Stadium, London
Attendance: 78,768
Referee: Paul Williams (New Zealand)

Team details

FB	15	Marcus Smith
RW	14	Tommy Freeman	(substituted off) 67'
OC	13	Ollie Lawrence
IC	12	Fraser Dingwall
LW	11	Immanuel Feyi-Waboso
FH	10	Fin Smith
SH	9	Alex Mitchell	(substituted off) 63'
N8	8	Chandler Cunningham-South	(substituted off) 54'
OF	7	Ben Earl
BF	6	Guy Pepper	(substituted off) 54'
RL	5	Ollie Chessum	(substituted off) 71'
LL	4	Alex Coles
TP	3	Joe Heyes	(substituted off) 54'
HK	2	Luke Cowan-Dickie	(substituted off) 54'
LP	1	Ellis Genge (c)	(substituted off) 54'
Replacements:
HK	16	Jamie George	(substituted on) 54'
PR	17	Fin Baxter	(substituted on) 54'
PR	18	Asher Opoku-Fordjour	(substituted on) 54'
LK	19	Maro Itoje	(substituted on) 71'
FL	20	Tom Curry	(substituted on) 54'
FL	21	Henry Pollock	(substituted on) 54'
SH	22	Ben Spencer	(substituted on) 63'
WG	23	Henry Arundell	(substituted on) 67'
Coach:
(England) Steve Borthwick

FB	15	Salesi Rayasi
RW	14	Selestino Ravutaumada	(yellow card) 36'
OC	13	Kalaveti Ravouvou
IC	12	Josua Tuisova	(yellow card) 60'
LW	11	Jiuta Wainiqolo		(substituted off) 57'
FH	10	Caleb Muntz		(substituted off) 60'
SH	9	Simione Kuruvoli		(substituted off) 67'
N8	8	Viliame Mata
OF	7	Elia Canakaivata		(substituted off) 62'
BF	6	Pita Gus Sowakula
RL	5	Temo Mayanavanua
LL	4	Isoa Nasilasila		(substituted off) 66'
TP	3	Mesake Doge		(substituted off) 57'
HK	2	Tevita Ikanivere (c)		(substituted off) 57'
LP	1	Eroni Mawi		(substituted off) 57'
Replacements:
HK	16	Zuriel Togiatama		(substituted on) 57'
PR	17	Haereiti Hetet		(substituted on) 57'
PR	18	Samu Tawake		(substituted on) 57'
LK	19	Mesake Vocevoce		(substituted on) 66'
FL	20	Motikai Murray		(substituted on) 62'
SH	21	Sam Wye		(substituted on) 67'
FH	22	Isaiah Armstrong-Ravula		(substituted on) 60'
CE	23	Sireli Maqala		(substituted on) 57'
Coach:
(Australia) Mick Byrne

Player of the Match:
Ben Earl (England)

Assistant referees:
Luc Ramos (France)
Katsuki Furuse (Japan)
Television match official:
Mike Adamson (Scotland)
Foul play review officer:
Quinton Immelman (South Africa)

Notes:

- Pita Gus Sowakula (Fiji) made his international debut.

8 November 2025
18:40 CET (UTC+1)

Italy	26–19	Australia
Try: Lynagh 58' c Ioane 61' c Con: Garbisi (2/2) 59', 62'; Pen: Garbisi (4/4) 6', 10', 36', 48'	Report	Try: Faessler 20' m Bell 31' c C. Gordon 50' c Con: Kellaway (2/3) 32', 51'

Stadio Friuli, Udine
Attendance: 23,191
Referee: Andrew Brace (Ireland)

Team details

FB	15	Ange Capuozzo
RW	14	Louis Lynagh
OC	13	Ignacio Brex (c)
IC	12	Tommaso Menoncello	(substituted off) 81'
LW	11	Monty Ioane
FH	10	Paolo Garbisi
SH	9	Stephen Varney	(substituted off) 68'
N8	8	Lorenzo Cannone
OF	7	Manuel Zuliani	(substituted off) 68'
BF	6	Ross Vintcent	(substituted off) 70'
RL	5	Andrea Zambonin
LL	4	Niccolò Cannone
TP	3	Simone Ferrari	(substituted off) 50'
HK	2	Giacomo Nicotera	(substituted off) 68'
LP	1	Danilo Fischetti	(substituted off) 63'
Replacements:
HK	16	Tommaso Di Bartolomeo	(substituted on) 68'
PR	17	Mirco Spagnolo	(substituted on) 63'
PR	18	Marco Riccioni	(substituted on) 50'
LK	19	Federico Ruzza	(substituted on) 70'
FL	20	Alessandro Izekor	(substituted on) 68'
SH	21	Martin Page-Relo	(substituted on) 68'
FH	22	Tommaso Allan
FH	23	Leonardo Marin	(substituted on) 81'
Coach:
(Argentina) Gonzalo Quesada

FB	15	Andrew Kellaway
RW	14	Corey Toole
OC	13	Joseph Sua'ali'i	(yellow card) 58'
IC	12	Hunter Paisami		(substituted off) 70'
LW	11	Harry Potter
FH	10	Carter Gordon		(substituted off) 55'
SH	9	Jake Gordon		(substituted off) 76'
N8	8	Harry Wilson (c)		(substituted off) 71'
OF	7	Fraser McReight
BF	6	Tom Hooper
RL	5	Jeremy Williams		(substituted off) 64'
LL	4	Nick Frost
TP	3	Taniela Tupou		(substituted off) 47'
HK	2	Matt Faessler		(substituted off) 64'
LP	1	Angus Bell		(substituted off) 41'
Replacements:
HK	16	Billy Pollard		(substituted on) 64'
PR	17	Aidan Ross		(substituted on) 41'
PR	18	Zane Nonggorr		(substituted on) 47'
N8	19	Rob Valetini		(substituted on) 64'
FL	20	Pete Samu		(substituted on) 71'
SH	21	Ryan Lonergan		(substituted on) 76'
FH	22	Tane Edmed		(substituted on) 55'
WG	23	Filipo Daugunu		(substituted on) 70'
Coach:
(New Zealand) Joe Schmidt

Player of the Match:
Stephen Varney (Italy)

Assistant referees:
Hollie Davidson (Scotland)
Sam Grove-White (Scotland)
Television match official:
Olly Hodges (Ireland)
Foul play review officer:
Leo Colgan (Ireland)

Notes:

- This was the first time that Italy has won back-to-back matches against Australia.

8 November 2025
14:00 COT (UTC-5)

Colombia	34–25	Mexico
Try: Forero 7' c Agudelo 16' m Sánchez 39' m Alzate 47' c Perez 51' m Jiménez 79' m Con: Arango (2/6) 8', 48'	Report	Try: Diaz 18' c Macias 35' m De Escobar 55' m Olivo 60' m Con: Rodriguez (1/3) 19'; Pen: Rodriguez (1/1) 10'

Estadio Cincuentenario, Medellín

8 November 2025
21:10 CET (UTC+1)

France	17–32	South Africa
Try: Penaud (2) 3' c, 26' c Con: Ramos (2/2) 4', 27'; Pen: Ramos (1/1) 58'	Report	Try: Renaich 32' c Esterhuizen 64' m Williams 70' c Feinberg-Mngomezulu 76' c Con: Feinberg-Mngomezulu (3/4) 33', 71', 77'; Pen: Feinberg-Mngomezulu (2/4) 9', 12'

Stade de France, Paris
Attendance: 80,000
Referee: Angus Gardner (Australia)

Team details

FB	15	Thomas Ramos
RW	14	Damian Penaud
OC	13	Pierre-Louis Barassi
IC	12	Gaël Fickou (c)		(substituted off) 59'
LW	11	Louis Bielle-Biarrey	(yellow card) 64'
FH	10	Romain Ntamack
SH	9	Nolann Le Garrec		(substituted off) 59'
N8	8	Mickaël Guillard		(substituted off) 47'
OF	7	Paul Boudehent		(substituted off) 71'
BF	6	Anthony Jelonch
RL	5	Emmanuel Meafou		(substituted off) 47'
LL	4	Thibaud Flament
TP	3	Régis Montagne		(substituted off) 47'
HK	2	Julien Marchand		(substituted off) 47'
LP	1	Baptiste Erdocio		(substituted off) 47'
Replacements:
HK	16	Guillaume Cramont		(substituted on) 47'
PR	17	Jean-Baptiste Gros		(substituted on) 47'
PR	18	Dorian Aldegheri		(substituted on) 47'
LK	19	Romain Taofifénua		(substituted on) 47'
LK	20	Hugo Auradou		(substituted on) 71'
FL	21	Oscar Jégou		(substituted on) 47'
SH	22	Maxime Lucu		(substituted on) 59'
CE	23	Nicolas Depoortère		(substituted on) 59'
Coach:
(France) Fabien Galthié

FB	15	Damian Willemse		(substituted off) 56'
RW	14	Cheslin Kolbe
OC	13	Jesse Kriel
IC	12	Damian de Allende		(substituted off) 47'
LW	11	Kurt-Lee Arendse
FH	10	Sacha Feinberg-Mngomezulu
SH	9	Cobus Reinach		(substituted off) 59'
N8	8	Jasper Wiese
BF	7	Pieter-Steph du Toit
OF	6	Siya Kolisi (c)				(substituted off) 40'
RL	5	Lood de Jager	(red card) 38'	(substituted off) 10'	(substituted on) 22'
LL	4	Eben Etzebeth		(substituted off) 47'
TP	3	Thomas du Toit		(substituted off) 47'
HK	2	Malcolm Marx		(substituted off) 77'
LP	1	Boan Venter		(substituted off) 31'
Replacements:
HK	16	Johan Grobbelaar		(substituted on) 77'
PR	17	Gerhard Steenekamp		(substituted on) 31'
PR	18	Wilco Louw		(substituted on) 47'
LK	19	RG Snyman		(substituted on) 47'
LK	20	Ruan Nortjé		(substituted on) 10'	(substituted off) 22'	(substituted on) 40'
CE	21	André Esterhuizen		(substituted on) 47'
SH	22	Grant Williams		(substituted on) 58'
FH	23	Manie Libbok		(substituted on) 56'
Coach:
(South Africa) Rassie Erasmus

Player of the Match:
Sacha Feinberg-Mngomezulu (South Africa)

Assistant referees:
Nika Amashukeli (Georgia)
Christophe Ridley (England)
Television match official:
Ian Tempest (England)
Foul play review officer:
Andrew Jackson (England)

Notes:

- Guillaume Cramont (France) made his international debut.
- Siya Kolisi became the ninth Springbok to earn 100 test caps.

9 November 2025
15:10 GMT (UTC+0)

Wales	28–52	Argentina
Try: Williams 14' c Lake 20' c Morgan 53' c Murray 72' c Con: Edwards (3/3) 15', 21', 54'; Evans (1/1) 73'	Report	Try: Delgado 6' c Prisciantelli (2) 9' c, 61' c Cruz 37' c M. Carreras 39' c Delguy 43' c Grondona 79' c Con: S. Carreras (7/7) 7', 10', 38', 40', 43', 62', 80'; Pen: S. Carreras (1/1) 30'

Millennium Stadium, Cardiff
Attendance: 50,185
Referee: Ben O'Keeffe (New Zealand)

Team details

FB	15	Blair Murray
RW	14	Tom Rogers		(substituted off) 44'
OC	13	Max Llewellyn
IC	12	Ben Thomas	(yellow card) 26'
LW	11	Josh Adams
FH	10	Dan Edwards		(substituted off) 64'
SH	9	Tomos Williams	(yellow card) 42'	(substituted off) 75'
N8	8	Aaron Wainwright		(substituted off) 64'
OF	7	Jac Morgan (c)		(substituted off) 54'
BF	6	Alex Mann
RL	5	Adam Beard
LL	4	Dafydd Jenkins
TP	3	Keiron Assiratti		(substituted off) 44'
HK	2	Dewi Lake		(substituted off) 54'
LP	1	Rhys Carré		(substituted off) 44'
Replacements:
HK	16	Liam Belcher		(substituted on) 54'
PR	17	Nicky Smith		(substituted on) 44'
PR	18	Archie Griffin		(substituted on) 44'
LK	19	Freddie Thomas		(substituted on) 64'
FL	20	Olly Cracknell		(substituted on) 54'
SH	21	Kieran Hardy		(substituted on) 75'
FH	22	Jarrod Evans		(substituted on) 64'
WG	23	Louis Rees-Zammit		(substituted on) 44'
Coach:
(Wales) Steve Tandy

FB	15	Santiago Carreras	(substituted off) 46'	(substituted on) 58'
RW	14	Bautista Delguy
OC	13	Justo Piccardo
IC	12	Santiago Chocobares		(substituted off) 58'
LW	11	Mateo Carreras	(substituted off) 58'
FH	10	Gerónimo Prisciantelli
SH	9	Simón Benítez Cruz	(substituted off) 65'
N8	8	Joaquín Oviedo	(substituted off) 58'
OF	7	Juan Martín González
BF	6	Pablo Matera
RL	5	Marcos Kremer	(substituted off) 60'
LL	4	Guido Petti
TP	3	Pedro Delgado	(substituted off) 45'
HK	2	Julián Montoya (c)	(substituted off) 66'
LP	1	Mayco Vivas	(substituted off) 45'
Replacements:
HK	16	Ignacio Ruiz	(substituted on) 66'
PR	17	Thomas Gallo	(substituted on) 45'
PR	18	Tomás Rapetti	(substituted on) 45'
LK	19	Matías Alemanno	(substituted on) 60'
FL	20	Santiago Grondona	(substituted on) 58'
SH	21	Agustín Moyano	(substituted on) 65'
FB	22	Juan Cruz Mallía	(substituted on) 46'
WG	23	Rodrigo Isgró	(substituted on) 58'
Coach:
(Argentina) Felipe Contepomi

Player of the Match:
Gerónimo Prisciantelli (Argentina)

Assistant referees:
Karl Dickson (England)
Anthony Woodthorpe (England)
Television match official:
Quinton Immelman (South Africa)
Foul play review officer:
Eric Gauzins (France)

Notes:

- Olly Cracknell (Wales) made his international debut.
- This was Argentina's largest winning margin over Wales (24 points), surpassing their previous record of 22 points set in 2021.

=== 15/16 November ===
15 November 2025
16:00 GST (UTC+4)

Georgia	38–17	Canada
Try: Aptsiauri (3) 8' m, 38' m, 45' c Tapladze 26' c Kveseladze 53' c Jalagonia 64' c Con: Abzhandadze (4/6) 27', 46', 54', 65'	Report	Try: Gallagher 56' c Parry 78' c Con: Nelson (2/2) 57', 79'; Pen: Nelson (1/1) 23'

Adjarabet Arena, Batumi
Referee: Paul Williams (New Zealand)

Team details

FB	15	Davit Niniashvili
RW	14	Shalva Aptsiauri		(substituted off) 65'
OC	13	Giorgi Kveseladze
IC	12	Georges Shvelidze
LW	11	Demur Tapladze	(yellow card) 71'
FH	10	Tedo Abzhandadze
SH	9	Vasil Lobzhanidze		(substituted off) 40'
N8	8	Beka Gorgadze (c)	(yellow card) 36'	(substituted off) 59'
OF	7	Beka Saghinadze
BF	6	Ilia Spanderashvili		(substituted off) 49'
RL	5	Lado Chachanidze		(substituted off) 52'
LL	4	Mikheil Babunashvili
TP	3	Irakli Aptsiauri		(substituted off) 52'
HK	2	Vano Karkadze		(substituted off) 52'
LP	1	Davit Abdushelishvili		(substituted off) 39'
Replacements:
HK	16	Irakli Kvatadze		(substituted on) 52'
PR	17	Giorgi Tetrashvili		(substituted on) 39'
PR	18	Beka Gigashvili		(substituted on) 52'
LK	19	Giorgi Javakhia		(substituted on) 52'
FL	20	Luka Ivanishvili	(yellow card) 70'	(substituted on) 59'
FL	21	Tornike Jalagonia		(substituted on) 48'
SH	22	Gela Aprasidze		(substituted on) 40'
FH	23	Luka Matkava		(substituted on) 65'
Coach:
(England) Richard Cockerill

FB	15	Peter Nelson
RW	14	Josiah Morra
OC	13	Spencer Jones		(substituted off) 73'
IC	12	Noah Flesch
LW	11	Nic Benn
FH	10	Robbie Povey
SH	9	Jason Higgins		(substituted off) 40'
N8	8	Matthew Oworu
OF	7	Lucas Rumball (c)
BF	6	Mason Flesch		(substituted off) 52'
RL	5	Barnaby Waddell		(substituted off) 51'
LL	4	Piers von Dadelszen		(substituted off) 73'
TP	3	Cole Keith		(substituted off) 48'
HK	2	Dewald Kotze		(substituted off) 67'
LP	1	Emerson Prior		(substituted off) 48'
Replacements:
HK	16	Austin Creighton		(substituted on) 67'
PR	17	Sam Miller		(substituted on) 48'
PR	18	Matt Tierney		(substituted on) 48'
LK	19	Izzak Kelly		(substituted on) 51'
LK	20	Callum Botchar		(substituted on) 73'
FL	21	Sion Parry	(yellow card) 63'	(substituted on) 52'
SH	22	Brock Gallagher		(substituted on) 40'
CE	23	Kyle Tremblay		(substituted on) 73'
Coach:
(Australia) Steve Meehan

Assistant referees:
Federico Vedovelli (Italy)
Filippo Russo (Italy)
Television match official:
Aled Griffiths (Wales)

Notes:

- Beka Saghinadze (Georgia) earned his 50th test cap.

15 November 2025
13:40 CET (UTC+1)

Italy	14–32	South Africa
Try: Capuozzo 65' m Pen: Garbisi (3/5) 37', 43', 52'	Report	Try: Van Staden 40+1' c Van den Berg 60' c Williams 72' c Hooker 79' m Con: Pollard (2/2) 40+2', 61'; Libbok (1/2) 73'; Pen: Pollard (2/2) 34', 55'

Allianz Stadium, Turin
Attendance: 32,103
Referee: James Doleman (New Zealand)

Team details

FB	15	Ange Capuozzo
RW	14	Louis Lynagh
OC	13	Ignacio Brex (c)
IC	12	Tommaso Menoncello
LW	11	Monty Ioane		(substituted off) 66'
FH	10	Paolo Garbisi
SH	9	Stephen Varney		(substituted off) 66'
N8	8	Lorenzo Cannone	(yellow card) 56'
OF	7	Manuel Zuliani
BF	6	Ross Vintcent		(substituted off) 54'
RL	5	Andrea Zambonin		(substituted off) 49'
LL	4	Niccolò Cannone		(substituted off) 74'
TP	3	Marco Riccioni		(substituted off) 49'
HK	2	Giacomo Nicotera		(substituted off) 57'
LP	1	Danilo Fischetti		(substituted off) 68'
Replacements:
HK	16	Tommaso Di Bartolomeo		(substituted on) 57'
PR	17	Mirco Spagnolo		(substituted on) 68'
PR	18	Simone Ferrari		(substituted on) 49'
LK	19	Federico Ruzza		(substituted on) 49'
FL	20	Riccardo Favretto		(substituted on) 54'
FL	21	David Odiase		(substituted on) 74'
SH	22	Martin Page-Relo		(substituted on) 66'
FH	23	Tommaso Allan		(substituted on) 66'
Coach:
(Argentina) Gonzalo Quesada

FB	15	Damian Willemse
RW	14	Edwill van der Merwe		(substituted off) 27'	(substituted on) 42'
OC	13	Canan Moodie
IC	12	Ethan Hooker
LW	11	Kurt-Lee Arendse			(substituted off) 42'
FH	10	Handré Pollard		(substituted off) 68'
SH	9	Morné van den Berg		(substituted off) 66'
N8	8	Marco van Staden	(yellow card) 52'
BF	7	Ben-Jason Dixon		(substituted off) 14'
OF	6	Siya Kolisi (c)		(substituted off) 45'
RL	5	Franco Mostert	(red card) 11'
LL	4	Jean Kleyn		(substituted off) 53'
TP	3	Zachary Porthen		(substituted off) 19'
HK	2	Johan Grobbelaar
LP	1	Boan Venter		(substituted off) 24'	(substituted on) 35'	(substituted off) 40'
Replacements:
PR	16	Gerhard Steenekamp		(substituted on) 24'	(substituted off) 35'	(substituted on) 40'
PR	17	Wilco Louw		(substituted on) 19'
LK	18	RG Snyman		(substituted on) 45'
LK	19	Ruan Nortjé		(substituted on) 14'
CE	20	André Esterhuizen		(substituted on) 27'
FL	21	Kwagga Smith		(substituted on) 53'
SH	22	Grant Williams		(substituted on) 66'
FH	23	Manie Libbok		(substituted on) 68'
Coach:
(South Africa) Rassie Erasmus

Player of the Match:
Damian Willemse (South Africa)

Assistant referees:
Ben O'Keeffe (New Zealand)
Jérémy Rozier (France)
Television match official:
Tual Trainini (France)
Foul play review officer:
Eric Gauzins (France)

15 November 2025
15:00 WET (UTC+0)

Portugal	58–12	Hong Kong
Try: Begic 10' m Bento 13' c Marta (2) 25' c, 49' m Storti 60' m Belo 65' c Baptista 67' m Vareiro 70' c Martins 77' c Con: Guedes (2/4) 14', 25'; Vareiro (2/4) 65', 71'; Aubry (1/1) 77'; Pen: Guedes (1/2) 40'	Report	Try: Fameitau 28' c Spanton 37' m Con: McNeish (1/2) 29'

Estádio Nacional, Lisbon
Referee: Hollie Davidson (Scotland)

Team details

FB	15	Nuno Sousa Guedes	(substituted off) 62'
RW	14	Raffaele Storti
OC	13	Rodrigo Marta
IC	12	Tomás Appleton (c)	(substituted off) 64'
LW	11	Simão Bento
FH	10	Manuel Vareiro
SH	9	Tomas Amado	(substituted off) 46'
N8	8	David Wallis	(substituted off) 53'	(substituted on) 68'
OF	7	Nicolas Martins
BF	6	Francisco Almeida		(substituted off) 68'
RL	5	Duarte Torgal
LL	4	Duarte Nunes	(substituted off) 62'
TP	3	Cody Thomas	(substituted off) 46'
HK	2	Luka Begic	(substituted off) 46'
LP	1	Luis Lopes	(substituted off) 62'
Replacements:
PR	16	Abel da Cunha	(substituted on) 62'
HK	17	Nuno Mascarenhas	(substituted on) 46'
PR	18	António Prim	(substituted on) 46'
LK	19	Martim Belo	(substituted on) 62'
FL	20	Vasco Baptista	(substituted on) 53'
SH	21	Hugo Camacho	(substituted on) 46'
FH	22	Hugo Aubry	(substituted on) 62'
CE	23	Guilherme Vasconcelos	(substituted on) 64'
Coach:
(New Zealand) Simon Mannix

FB	15	Matt Worley
RW	14	Marcus Ramage	(yellow card) 66'
OC	13	Benjamin Axten-Burrett
IC	12	Thomas Hill		(substituted off) 65'
LW	11	Guy Spanton	(yellow card) 70'
FH	10	Gregor McNeish		(substituted off) 56'
SH	9	Brendon Nell		(substituted off) 76'
N8	8	Joshua Hrstich (c)
OF	7	Pierce MacKinlay-West
BF	6	Tyler McNutt		(substituted off) 62'
RL	5	Kyle Sullivan		(substituted off) 61'
LL	4	Max Murphy
TP	3	Zacceus Cinnamond		(substituted off) 50'
HK	2	Calum Scott		(substituted off) 61'
LP	1	Sunia Fameitau		(substituted off) 50'
Replacements:
HK	16	Harry Baron		(substituted on) 61'
PR	17	Callum McFeat Smith		(substituted on) 50'
PR	18	Faizal Solomona-Penesa		(substituted on) 50'
FL	19	Jack Bartlett		(substituted on) 61'
FL	20	James Sawyer		(substituted on) 62'
SH	21	Chui Wai Lap		(substituted on) 76'
FH	22	Joe Barker		(substituted on) 56'
WG	23	Dylan McCann		(substituted on) 65'
Coach:
(New Zealand) Logan Asplin

Assistant referees:
Ben Breakspear (Wales)
Ben Connor (Wales)
Television match official:
Matteo Liperini (Italy)

Notes:

- Luis Lopes, Duarte Nunes (both Portugal) and Harry Baron, Jack Bartlett, Chui Wai Lap, Dylan McCann, Max Murphy and Brendon Nell (all Hong Kong) made their international debuts.
- This was the first time Portugal hosted Hong Kong, and the first test match outside of a World Rugby competition or World Cup qualifier.

15 November 2025
17:00 EET (UTC+2)

Romania	18–26	United States
Try: Manumua 31' m Penalty try 80+2'; Pen: Conache (2/2) 18', 46'	Report	Try: Daniel 28' c McLean 62' c Con: De Haas (2/2) 28', 63'; Pen: Carty (4/5) 3', 13', 38', 70'

Stadionul Arcul de Triumf, Bucharest
Referee: Sam Grove-White (Scotland)

Team details

FB	15	Gabriel Pop		(substituted off) 7'
RW	14	Iliesa Tiqe
OC	13	Mihai Graure
IC	12	Jason Tomane
LW	11	Tevita Manumua
FH	10	Hinckley Vaovasa
SH	9	Alin Conache		(substituted off) 73'
N8	8	Adrian Mitu		(substituted off) 26'
OF	7	Cristi Chirică
BF	6	Cristi Boboc
RL	5	Andrei Mahu (c)		(substituted off) 58'
LL	4	Nicolaas Immelman		(substituted off) 64'
TP	3	Thomas Crețu		(substituted off) 58'
HK	2	Ștefan Buruiană		(substituted off) 58'
LP	1	Alexandru Savin		(substituted off) 58'
Replacements:
PR	16	Tudor Butnariu		(substituted on) 58'
HK	17	Joji Sikote		(substituted on) 58'
PR	18	Vasile Balan		(substituted on) 58'
LK	19	Marius Antonescu		(substituted on) 58'
FL	20	Dragoș Ser	(yellow card) 28'	(substituted on) 26'
LK	21	Matthew Tweddle		(substituted on) 64'
SH	22	Gabriel Rupanu		(substituted on) 73'
WG	23	Nicholas Onutu		(substituted on) 7'
Coach:
(France) David Gérard

FB	15	Toby Fricker
RW	14	Mark O'Keeffe
OC	13	Dominic Besag
IC	12	Tavite Lopeti
LW	11	Rufus McLean
FH	10	Luke Carty	(yellow card) 24'
SH	9	Ruben de Haas		(substituted off) 71'
N8	8	Jason Damm (c)
OF	7	Cory Daniel		(substituted off) 68'
BF	6	Paddy Ryan		(substituted off) 60'
RL	5	Tevita Naqali		(substituted off) 52'
LL	4	Marno Redelinghuys	(yellow card) 49'
TP	3	Tonga Kofe		(substituted off) 46'
HK	2	Kaleb Geiger		(substituted off) 68'
LP	1	Ezekiel Lindenmuth		(substituted off) 46'
Replacements:
HK	16	Mike Sosene-Feagai		(substituted on) 68'
PR	17	Payton Talea		(substituted on) 46'
PR	18	Maliu Niuafe		(substituted on) 46'
FL	19	Nafi Ma'afu	(yellow card) 80+1'	(substituted on) 52'
LK	20	Vili Helu		(substituted on) 68'
FL	21	Makeen Alikhan		(substituted on) 60'
FB	22	Mitch Wilson
SH	23	Michael Baska		(substituted on) 71'
Coach:
(United States) Scott Lawrence

Assistant referees:
Saba Abulashvili (Georgia)
Peter Martin (Ireland)
Television match official:
Ben Whitehouse (Wales)

Notes:

- Joji Sikote (Romania) made his international debut.
- The United States reclaimed the Pershing Cup.

15 November 2025
15:10 GMT (UTC+0)

England	33–19	New Zealand
Try: Lawrence 25' m Underhill 43' c Dingwall 55' c Roebuck 77' m Con: Ford (2/4) 44', 56'; Pen: Ford (1/1) 75'; Drop: Ford (2/2) 38', 40'	Report	Try: Faingaʻanuku 14' m Taylor 18' c Jordan 65' c Con: B. Barrett (1/2) 19'; McKenzie (1/1) 66'

Twickenham Stadium, London
Attendance: 81,953
Referee: Andrea Piardi (Italy)

Team details

FB	15	Freddie Steward		(substituted off) 22'
RW	14	Tom Roebuck
OC	13	Ollie Lawrence		(substituted off) 79'
IC	12	Fraser Dingwall
LW	11	Immanuel Feyi-Waboso
FH	10	George Ford
SH	9	Alex Mitchell		(substituted off) 73'
N8	8	Ben Earl	(yellow card) 64'
OF	7	Sam Underhill		(substituted off) 56'
BF	6	Guy Pepper		(substituted off) 56'
RL	5	Alex Coles
LL	4	Maro Itoje (c)
TP	3	Joe Heyes		(substituted off) 56'
HK	2	Jamie George		(substituted off) 44'
LP	1	Fin Baxter		(substituted off) 56'
Replacements:
HK	16	Luke Cowan-Dickie		(substituted on) 44'
PR	17	Ellis Genge		(substituted on) 56'
PR	18	Will Stuart		(substituted on) 56'
LK	19	Chandler Cunningham-South		(substituted on) 79'
FL	20	Tom Curry		(substituted on) 56'
FL	21	Henry Pollock		(substituted on) 56'
SH	22	Ben Spencer		(substituted on) 73'
FH	23	Marcus Smith		(substituted on) 22'
Coach:
(England) Steve Borthwick

FB	15	Will Jordan
RW	14	Leroy Carter
OC	13	Billy Proctor
IC	12	Quinn Tupaea		(substituted off) 56'
LW	11	Leicester Faingaʻanuku
FH	10	Beauden Barrett		(substituted off) 55'
SH	9	Cam Roigard		(substituted off) 45'
N8	8	Peter Lakai
OF	7	Ardie Savea
BF	6	Simon Parker		(substituted off) 48'	(substituted on) 51'	(substituted off) 55'
RL	5	Josh Lord		(substituted off) 67'
LL	4	Scott Barrett (c)
TP	3	Fletcher Newell		(substituted off) 6756'
HK	2	Codie Taylor	(yellow card) 41'			(substituted off) 67'
LP	1	Ethan de Groot		(substituted off) 40'
Replacements:
HK	16	Samisoni Taukei'aho		(substituted on) 48'	(substituted off) 51'	(substituted off) 67'
PR	17	Tamaiti Williams		(substituted on) 40'
PR	18	Pasilio Tosi		(substituted on) 56'
LK	19	Sam Darry		(substituted on) 67'
FL	20	Wallace Sititi				(substituted on) 55'
SH	21	Cortez Ratima		(substituted on) 45'
CE	22	Anton Lienert-Brown		(substituted on) 56'
FH	23	Damian McKenzie		(substituted on) 55'
Coach:
(New Zealand) Scott Robertson

Player of the Match:
George Ford (England)

Assistant referees:
Luc Ramos (France)
Gianluca Gnecchi (Italy)
Television match official:
Marius van der Westhuizen (South Africa)
Foul play review officer:
Mike Adamson (Scotland)

Notes:

- This was England's first win over New Zealand since 2019, and their first win at Twickenham against New Zealand since 2012.
- England reclaimed the Hillary Shield for the first time since 2012.

15 November 2025
17:00 CET (UTC+1)

Spain	25–29	England A
Try: Ezeala 44' c Con: Richardis (1/1) 45'; Pen: Richardis (6/6) 8', 25', 37', 40', 59', 76'	Report	Try: Caluori 33' c Hendy 62' m Tuipulotu 74' c Redshaw 78' c Con: Hodge (1/2) 34'; Atkinson (2/2) 74', 79'; Pen: Hodge (1/1) 54'

José Zorrilla Stadium, Valladolid
Attendance: 12,105
Referee: Morgan White (Hong Kong China)

Team details

FB	15	J. W. Bell	(yellow card) 78'
RW	14	Martiniano Cian	(yellow card) 20'	(substituted off) 70'
OC	13	Samuel Ezeala
IC	12	Álvar Gimeno		(substituted off) 40'
LW	11	Alejandro Laforga
FH	10	Lucien Richardis
SH	9	Estanislao Bay
N8	8	Raphaël Nieto
OF	7	Ekain Imaz		(substituted off) 63'
BF	6	Mario Pichardie
RL	5	Imanol Urraza
LL	4	Matthew Foulds		(substituted off) 70'
TP	3	Joel Merkler		(substituted off) 77'
HK	2	Álvaro García (c)		(substituted off) 77'
LP	1	Thierry Futeu		(substituted off) 58'
Replacements:
HK	16	Santiago Ovejero		(substituted on) 77'
PR	17	Bernardo Vasquez		(substituted on) 58'
PR	18	Joaquín Domínguez		(substituted on) 77'
LK	19	Ignacio Piñeiro		(substituted on) 70'
FL	20	Alex Saleta		(substituted on) 69'
SH	21	Nicolás Infer		(substituted on) 70'
FH	22	Gonzalo Vinuesa
CE	23	Iñaki Mateu		(substituted on) 40'
Coach:
(Argentina) Pablo Bouza

FB	15	Josh Hodge		(substituted off) 77'
RW	14	Noah Caluori
OC	13	Angus Hall
IC	12	Rekeiti Ma'asi-White		(substituted off) 17'	(substituted on) 18'	(substituted off) 54'
LW	11	George Hendy
FH	10	Charlie Atkinson
SH	9	Caolan Englefield		(substituted off) 24'
N8	8	Greg Fisilau
OF	7	Fitz Harding (c)		(substituted off) 63'
BF	6	Nathan Michelow	(yellow card) 12'	(substituted off) 77'
RL	5	Ben Bamber
LL	4	Olamide Sodeke
TP	3	Afolabi Fasogbon		(substituted off) 54'
HK	2	Nathan Jibulu	(yellow card) 7'			(substituted off) 63'
LP	1	Emmanuel Iyogun		(substituted off) 63'
Replacements:
HK	16	Kepu Tuipulotu		(substituted on) 17'	(substituted off) 18'	(substituted on) 63'
PR	17	Tarek Haffar		(substituted on) 63'
PR	18	Billy Sela		(substituted on) 54'
LK	19	Joe Owen		(substituted on) 63'
LK	20	Ewan Richards		(substituted on) 77'
SH	21	Archie McParland		(substituted on) 24'
CE	22	Joseph Woodward				(substituted on) 54'
WG	23	Ben Redshaw		(substituted on) 77'
Coach:
(England) Mark Mapletoft

Assistant referees:
Tomás Bertazza (Argentina)
Jen Lee (Spain)
Television match official:
Paulo Duarte (Portugal)

Notes:

- Samuel Ezeala and Alejandro Laforga (both Spain) made their international debuts.

15 November 2025
17:40 GMT (UTC+0)

Wales	24–23	Japan
Try: Edwards 6' c Rees-Zammit 50' c Tompkins 63' c Con: Edwards (3/3) 7', 51', 64'; Pen: Evans (1/1) 80+3'	Report	Try: Ishida 15' c Makisi 60' c Con: Lee (2/2) 16', 61'; Pen: Lee (3/4) 48', 56', 66'

Millennium Stadium, Cardiff
Attendance: 61,324
Referee: Matthew Carley (England)

Team details

FB	15	Blair Murray
RW	14	Louis Rees-Zammit
OC	13	Max Llewellyn
IC	12	Ben Thomas
LW	11	Josh Adams	(red card) 40'
FH	10	Dan Edwards		(substituted off) 79'
SH	9	Tomos Williams
N8	8	Olly Cracknell
OF	7	Alex Mann
BF	6	Aaron Wainwright		(substituted off) 49'
RL	5	Adam Beard
LL	4	Dafydd Jenkins		(substituted off) 71'
TP	3	Archie Griffin		(substituted off) 49'
HK	2	Dewi Lake (c)		(substituted off) 79'
LP	1	Nicky Smith		(substituted off) 49'
Replacements:
HK	16	Liam Belcher		(substituted on) 79'
PR	17	Rhys Carré		(substituted on) 49'
PR	18	Keiron Assiratti		(substituted on) 49'
LK	19	Freddie Thomas		(substituted on) 71'
N8	20	Taine Plumtree		(substituted on) 49'
SH	21	Kieran Hardy
FH	22	Jarrod Evans		(substituted on) 79'
CE	23	Nick Tompkins		(substituted on) 61'
Coach:
(Wales) Steve Tandy

FB	15	Yoshitaka Yazaki
RW	14	Kippei Ishida		(substituted off) 77'
OC	13	Dylan Riley
IC	12	Charlie Lawrence
LW	11	Tomoki Osada
FH	10	Lee Seung-sin		(substituted off) 76'
SH	9	Naoto Saitō
N8	8	Faulua Makisi	(yellow card) 29'
OF	7	Kanji Shimokawa		(substituted off) 70'
BF	6	Jack Cornelsen
RL	5	Warner Dearns (c)
LL	4	Epineri Uluiviti	(yellow card) 25'	(substituted off) 49'
TP	3	Keijiro Tamefusa		(substituted off) 49'
HK	2	Kenji Sato
LP	1	Kenta Kobayashi		(substituted off) 77'
Replacements:
HK	16	Shodai Hirao
PR	17	Sho Furuhata		(substituted on) 77'
PR	18	Shuhei Takeuchi		(substituted on) 49'
LK	19	Harry Hockings	(yellow card) 80'	(substituted on) 49'
LK	20	Tyler Paul		(substituted on) 70'
SH	21	Kenta Fukuda
FH	22	Shinya Komura		(substituted on) 76'
WG	23	Kazuma Ueda		(substituted on) 77'
Coach:
(Australia) Eddie Jones

Player of the Match:
Olly Cracknell (Wales)

Assistant referees:
Nic Berry (Australia)
Anthony Woodthorpe (England)
Television match official:
Andrew Jackson (England)
Foul play review officer:
Quinton Immelman (South Africa)

Notes:

- Sho Furuhata, Harry Hockings and Kazuma Ueda (all Japan) made their international debuts.
- This was Wales' first home test win since their 20–9 win over England during the 2023 Rugby World Cup warm-up matches.

15 November 2025
21:10 CET (UTC+1)

France	34–21	Fiji
Try: Depoortère (2) 6' c, 71' c Marchand 15' c Ollivon 19' c Con: Ramos (4/4) 7', 16', 20', 72'; Pen: Ramos (2/3) 50', 57'	Report	Try: Kuruvoli 28' c Ravutaumada 40' c Wainiqolo 43' c Con: Kuruvoli (3/3) 29', 40+1', 44'

Stade Atlantique, Bordeaux
Attendance: 42,115
Referee: Christophe Ridley (England)

Team details

FB	15	Thomas Ramos	(yellow card) 78'
RW	14	Damian Penaud
OC	13	Nicolas Depoortère
IC	12	Pierre-Louis Barassi		(substituted off) 14'
LW	11	Louis Bielle-Biarrey
FH	10	Romain Ntamack
SH	9	Maxime Lucu		(substituted off) 76'
N8	8	Grégory Alldritt (c)
OF	7	Oscar Jégou
BF	6	Anthony Jelonch
RL	5	Romain Taofifénua		(substituted off) 54'
LL	4	Charles Ollivon
TP	3	Régis Montagne		(substituted off) 64'
HK	2	Julien Marchand		(substituted off) 50'
LP	1	Jean-Baptiste Gros		(substituted off) 50'
Replacements:
HK	16	Maxime Lamothe		(substituted on) 50'
PR	17	Rodrigue Neti		(substituted on) 50'
PR	18	Thomas Laclayat		(substituted on) 64'
LK	19	Jimi Maximin		(substituted on) 64'
LK	20	Hugo Auradou		(substituted on) 52'
FL	21	Paul Boudehent			(substituted on) 30'
SH	22	Baptiste Jauneau		(substituted on) 76'
CE	23	Émilien Gailleton		(substituted on) 14'	(substituted off) 30'
Coach:
(France) Fabien Galthié

FB	15	Salesi Rayasi
RW	14	Selestino Ravutaumada	(yellow card) 13'	(substituted off) 65'
OC	13	Kalaveti Ravouvou
IC	12	Josua Tuisova
LW	11	Jiuta Wainiqolo		(substituted off) 79'
FH	10	Caleb Muntz
SH	9	Simione Kuruvoli		(substituted off) 76'
N8	8	Viliame Mata		(substituted off) 54'
OF	7	Elia Canakaivata
BF	6	Pita Gus Sowakula
RL	5	Temo Mayanavanua
LL	4	Isoa Nasilasila		(substituted off) 69'
TP	3	Mesake Doge		(substituted off) 75'
HK	2	Tevita Ikanivere (c)		(substituted off) 75'
LP	1	Eroni Mawi		(substituted off) 61'
Replacements:
HK	16	Zuriel Togiatama		(substituted on) 75'
PR	17	Atunaisa Sokobale		(substituted on) 61'
PR	18	Tim Hoyt		(substituted on) 61'
LK	19	Mesake Vocevoce		(substituted on) 69'
FL	20	Kitione Salawa Jr.		(substituted on) 54'
SH	21	Sam Wye		(substituted on) 76'
FH	22	Isaiah Armstrong-Ravula		(substituted on) 79'
CE	23	Sireli Maqala		(substituted on) 65'
Coach:
(Australia) Mick Byrne

Assistant referees:
Nika Amashukeli (Georgia)
Morné Ferreira (South Africa)
Television match official:
Marius Jonker (South Africa)
Foul play review officer:
Stuart Terheege (England)

Notes:

- Maxime Lamothe, Jimi Maximin (both France), Tim Hoyt and Atunaisa Sokobale (both Fiji) made their international debuts.

15 November 2025
20:10 WET (UTC+0)

Ireland	46–19	Australia
Try: Hansen (3) 6' c, 11' c, 28' m Doris 70' c Baird 78' c Henshaw 80+1' c Con: S. Prendergast (2/3) 7', 11'; Crowley (3/3) 71', 78', 80+2'; Pen: Crowley (1/1) 62'; Drop: S. Prendergast (1/1) 56'	Report	Try: Ikitau 18' c McReight 40' c Pollard 74' m Con: O'Connor (2/2) 19', 40+1'

Aviva Stadium, Dublin
Attendance: 51,700
Referee: Karl Dickson (England)

Team details

FB	15	Mack Hansen		(substituted off) 72'
RW	14	Tommy O'Brien
OC	13	Robbie Henshaw
IC	12	Stuart McCloskey	(substituted off) 27'
LW	11	James Lowe
FH	10	Sam Prendergast	(substituted off) 61'
SH	9	Jamison Gibson-Park	(substituted off) 71'	(substituted on) 72'
N8	8	Jack Conan	(substituted off) 48'
OF	7	Caelan Doris (c)
BF	6	Ryan Baird
RL	5	Tadhg Beirne
LL	4	James Ryan	(substituted off) 57'
TP	3	Tadhg Furlong	(substituted off) 57'	(substituted on) 72'
HK	2	Dan Sheehan	(substituted off) 57'
LP	1	Paddy McCarthy	(substituted off) 48'
Replacements:
HK	16	Rónan Kelleher	(substituted on) 57'
PR	17	Andrew Porter	(substituted on) 48'
PR	18	Tom Clarkson	(substituted on) 57'	(substituted off) 72'
FL	19	Nick Timoney	(substituted on) 48'
FL	20	Cian Prendergast	(substituted on) 57'
SH	21	Craig Casey	(substituted on) 71'
FH	22	Jack Crowley	(substituted on) 61'
CE	23	Bundee Aki	(substituted on) 27'
Coach:
(England) Andy Farrell

FB	15	Max Jorgensen
RW	14	Filipo Daugunu		(substituted off) 59'
OC	13	Joseph Sua'ali'i
IC	12	Len Ikitau
LW	11	Harry Potter
FH	10	James O'Connor		(substituted off) 71'
SH	9	Jake Gordon		(substituted off) 71'
N8	8	Harry Wilson (c)
OF	7	Fraser McReight
BF	6	Rob Valetini		(substituted off) 63'
RL	5	Tom Hooper
LL	4	Jeremy Williams		(substituted off) 55'
TP	3	Allan Alaalatoa		(substituted off) 61'
HK	2	Matt Faessler		(substituted off) 54'
LP	1	Angus Bell		(substituted off) 54'
Replacements:
HK	16	Billy Pollard		(substituted on) 54'
PR	17	Tom Robertson		(substituted on) 54'
PR	18	Zane Nonggorr		(substituted on) 61'
LK	19	Nick Frost	(yellow card) 71'	(substituted on) 55'
FL	20	Carlo Tizzano		(substituted on) 63'
SH	21	Ryan Lonergan		(substituted on) 71'
FH	22	Tane Edmed		(substituted on) 71'
FB	23	Andrew Kellaway		(substituted on) 59'
Coach:
(New Zealand) Joe Schmidt

Player of the Match:
Mack Hansen (Ireland)

Assistant referees:
Pierre Brousset (France)
Adam Leal (England)
Television match official:
Ian Tempest (England)
Foul play review officer:
Dan Jones (England)

Notes:

- This was Ireland's largest winning margin over Australia (27 points), surpassing the 15-point margin set in 2006 and 1979.
- The 46 points scored by Ireland were the most points they have scored against Australia.

16 November 2025
16:00 CET (UTC+1)

Uruguay	21–45	(New Zealand) All Blacks XV
Try: Etcheverry 14' c Alonso 30' c Deus 53' c Con: Cotarmanac'h (3/3) 15', 31', 55'		Try: Ratumaitavuki-Kneepkens (2) 3' m, 74' m Fakatava 26' c Nanai-Seturo 32' c Kumeroa 46' c Ennor 61' c Rona 70' c Con: Reihana (5/7) 27', 33', 47', 62', 75'

Stade Raoul-Barrière, Beziers, France
Attendance: 16,284
Referee: Kevin Bralley (France)

Team details

FB	15	Francisco Gonzalez Capdevila
RW	14	Bautista Basso		(substituted off) 40'
OC	13	Joaquín Suárez		(substituted off) 62'
IC	12	Juan Manuel Alonso
LW	11	Franco Scaldaferri
FH	10	Jean Cotarmanac'h
SH	9	Felipe Etcheverry
N8	8	Manuel Ardao		(substituted off) 40'
OF	7	Lucas Bianchi	(yellow card) 39'
BF	6	Santiago Civetta
RL	5	Manuel Rosmarino
LL	4	Felipe Aliaga (c)		(substituted off) 48'
TP	3	Ignacio Péculo		(substituted off) 49'
HK	2	Germán Kessler		(substituted off) 58'
LP	1	Francisco Suárez		(substituted off) 40'
Replacements:
HK	16	Sebastián Pérez		(substituted on) 58'
PR	17	Mateo Perillo		(substituted on) 40'
PR	18	Reinaldo Piussi		(substituted on) 49'
FL	19	Carlos Deus		(substituted on) 48'
FL	20	Manuel Diana		(substituted on) 40'
SH	21	Arturo Ten Hoever		(substituted on) 72'
FH	22	Ícaro Amarillo		(substituted on) 62'
WG	23	Ignacio Álvarez		(substituted on) 48'
Coach:
(Argentina) Rodolfo Ambrosio

FB	15	Jacob Ratumaitavuki-Kneepkens	(yellow card) 43'
RW	14	Chay Fihaki
OC	13	Braydon Ennor		(substituted off) 68'
IC	12	Dallas McLeod
LW	11	Etene Nanai-Seturo		(substituted off) 59'
FH	10	Rivez Reihana
SH	9	Folau Fakatava		(substituted off) 56'
N8	8	Dalton Papali'i (c)
OF	7	Sean Withy		(substituted off) 59'
BF	6	TK Howden		(substituted off) 68'
RL	5	Caleb Delany
LL	4	Josh Beehre
TP	3	George Dyer		(substituted off) 40'
HK	2	Bradley Slater		(substituted off) 56'
LP	1	Josh Fusitua		(substituted off) 62'
Replacements:
HK	16	Brodie McAlister		(substituted on) 56'
PR	17	Siale Lauaki		(substituted on) 62'
PR	18	Benet Kumeroa		(substituted on) 40'
FL	19	Devan Flanders		(substituted on) 68'
FL	20	Kaylum Boshier		(substituted on) 59'
SH	21	Xavier Roe		(substituted on) 56'
FH	22	Josh Jacomb		(substituted on) 68'
CE	23	Daniel Rona		(substituted on) 59'
Coach:
(New Zealand) Jamie Joseph

Assistant referees:
Benoit Rousselet (France)
Thomas Charabas (France)

16 November 2025
15:10 GMT (UTC+0)

Scotland	24–33	Argentina
Try: Dempsey 13' c Ashman (2) 28' c, 44' c Con: Russell (3/3) 14', 28', 45'; Pen: Russell (1/1) 64'		Try: Montoya 57' c Isgró 60' m Rubiolo 70' c Matera 75' c Piccardo 79' c Con: S. Carreras (4/5) 58', 70', 76', 80'

Murrayfield Stadium, Edinburgh
Attendance: 67,144
Referee: Andrew Brace (Ireland)

Team details

FB	15	Blair Kinghorn	(yellow card) 54'
RW	14	Darcy Graham
OC	13	Rory Hutchinson		(substituted off) 65'
IC	12	Sione Tuipulotu (c)
LW	11	Kyle Steyn
FH	10	Finn Russell
SH	9	Jamie Dobie
N8	8	Jack Dempsey
OF	7	Rory Darge
BF	6	Gregor Brown		(substituted off) 8'
RL	5	Grant Gilchrist		(substituted off) 71'
LL	4	Scott Cummings
TP	3	D'Arcy Rae		(substituted off) 33'
HK	2	Ewan Ashman		(substituted off) 71'
LP	1	Pierre Schoeman
Replacements:
HK	16	George Turner		(substituted on) 71'
PR	17	Nathan McBeth
PR	18	Elliot Millar Mills		(substituted on) 33'
FL	19	Josh Bayliss		(substituted on) 71'
FL	20	Matt Fagerson		(substituted on) 8'
SH	21	George Horne
CE	22	Tom Jordan
WG	23	Duhan van der Merwe		(substituted on) 65'
Coach:
(Scotland) Gregor Townsend

FB	15	Juan Cruz Mallía	(yellow card) 5'
RW	14	Rodrigo Isgró
OC	13	Matías Moroni		(substituted off) 67'
IC	12	Santiago Chocobares
LW	11	Mateo Carreras
FH	10	Gerónimo Prisciantelli		(substituted off) 46'
SH	9	Simón Benítez Cruz		(substituted off) 46'
N8	8	Joaquín Oviedo		(substituted off) 46'
OF	7	Juan Martín González
BF	6	Santiago Grondona
RL	5	Pedro Rubiolo
LL	4	Guido Petti		(substituted off) 73'
TP	3	Pedro Delgado		(substituted off) 46'
HK	2	Julián Montoya (c)		(substituted off) 73'
LP	1	Mayco Vivas		(substituted off) 46'
Replacements:
HK	16	Ignacio Ruiz		(substituted on) 73'
PR	17	Thomas Gallo		(substituted on) 46'
PR	18	Francisco Coria Marchetti		(substituted on) 46'
LK	19	Efraín Elías		(substituted on) 73'
FL	20	Pablo Matera		(substituted on) 46'
SH	21	Agustín Moyano		(substituted on) 46'
FH	22	Santiago Carreras		(substituted on) 46'
CE	23	Justo Piccardo		(substituted on) 67'
Coach:
(Argentina) Felipe Contepomi

Player of the Match:
Santiago Carreras (Argentina)

Assistant referees:
Angus Gardner (Australia)
Luke Pearce (England)
Television match official:
Olly Hodges (Ireland)
Foul play review officer:
Leo Colgan (Ireland)

Notes:

- Darcy Graham (Scotland), Juan Martín González and Juan Cruz Mallía (both Argentina) earned their 50th test cap. González became the first player born in the 21st century to accumulate 50 test caps.
- This was Argentina's first away win over Scotland since their 13–12 win during the 2011 Rugby World Cup, and their first in Scotland since their 9–6 win in 2009.

=== 17 November ===
17 November 2025
13:30 GST (UTC+4)

Emerging Scotland	12–19	Tonga XV
Try: McAlpine (1) c Afshar (1) m Con: Urwin (1/2)	Report	Try: Faingaʻanuku (1) m Poloniati (1) c Sakalia (1) c Con: Havili (2/3)

Scotstoun Stadium, Glasgow
Referee: Mike Adamson (Scotland)

=== 22/23 November ===
22 November 2025
16:00 GST (UTC+4)

Georgia	23–25	Japan
Try: Tapladze 68' c Kakhoidze 77' c Con: Abzhandadze (2/2) 70', 78'; Pen: Abzhandadze (3/3) 5', 29', 45'		Try: Riley 10' c Con: Lee (1/1) 11'; Pen: Lee (6/6) 8', 26', 32', 43', 73', 80+1',

Mikheil Meskhi Stadium, Tbilisi
Referee: Eoghan Cross (Ireland)

Team details

FB	15	Davit Niniashvili
RW	14	Aka Tabutsadze
OC	13	Giorgi Kveseladze
IC	12	Tornike Kakhoidze
LW	11	Demur Tapladze
FH	10	Tedo Abzhandadze		(substituted off) 80'
SH	9	Vasil Lobzhanidze		(substituted off) 56'
N8	8	Beka Gorgadze (c)		(substituted off) 66'
OF	7	Beka Saghinadze
BF	6	Tornike Jalagonia		(substituted off) 66'
RL	5	Lado Chachanidze		(substituted off) 51'
LL	4	Mikheil Babunashvili
TP	3	Irakli Aptsiauri	(yellow card) 19'
HK	2	Irakli Kvatadze		(substituted off) 66'
LP	1	Giorgi Akhaladze		(substituted off) 29'
Replacements:
HK	16	Nika Sutidze		(substituted on) 66'
PR	17	Giorgi Mamaiashvili		(substituted on) 29'
PR	18	Kakhaber Darbaidze
LK	19	Giorgi Javakhia		(substituted on) 51'
FL	20	Luka Ivanishvili		(substituted on) 61'
FL	21	Sandro Mamamtavrishvili		(substituted on) 66'
SH	22	Gela Aprasidze		(substituted on) 56'
FH	23	Luka Matkava		(substituted on) 80'
Coach:
(England) Richard Cockerill

FB	15	Sam Greene	(substituted off) 27'
RW	14	Kazuma Ueda
OC	13	Dylan Riley
IC	12	Charlie Lawrence	(substituted off) 40'
LW	11	Tomoki Osada
FH	10	Lee Seung-sin
SH	9	Naoto Saitō	(substituted off) 70'
N8	8	Jack Cornelsen
OF	7	Kanji Shimokawa
BF	6	Tyler Paul
RL	5	Warner Dearns (c)
LL	4	Epineri Uluiviti	(substituted off) 48'
TP	3	Shuhei Takeuchi	(substituted off) 60'
HK	2	Kenji Sato
LP	1	Kenta Kobayashi
Replacements:
HK	16	Shodai Hirao
PR	17	Sho Furuhata
PR	18	Keijiro Tamefusa	(substituted on) 60'
LK	19	Harry Hockings	(substituted on) 48'
FL	20	Shu Yamamoto
SH	21	Kenta Fukuda	(substituted on) 70'
FH	22	Shinya Komura	(substituted on) 27'
CE	23	Yuki Ikeda	(substituted on) 40'
Coach:
(Australia) Eddie Jones

Assistant referees:
Anthony Woodthorpe (England)
Peter Martin (Ireland)
Television match official:
Leo Colgan (Ireland)

Notes:

- Nika Sutidze (Georgia) made his international debuts.

22 November 2025
17:00 EET (UTC+2)

Romania	21–31	Uruguay
Try: Butnariu 39' c Immelman 56' c Crețu 78' c Con: Conache (3/3) 40', 57', 79'	Report	Try: Kessler 14' c Basso 18' c Diana 44' c Myszka 67' c Con: Álvarez (4/4) 15', 19', 45', 68'; Pen: Álvarez (1/1) 60'

Stadionul Arcul de Triumf, Bucharest
Referee: Jérémy Rozier (France)

Team details

FB	15	Ovidiu Neagu		(substituted off) 62'
RW	14	Iliesa Tiqe
OC	13	Nicholas Onutu		(substituted off) 62'
IC	12	Jason Tomane		(substituted off) 64'
LW	11	Tevita Manumua
FH	10	Hinckley Vaovasa
SH	9	Alin Conache
N8	8	Cristi Chirică
OF	7	Nicolaas Immelman			(substituted off) 64'
BF	6	Cristi Boboc		(substituted off) 54'	(substituted on) 64'
RL	5	Andrei Mahu (c)		(substituted off) 59'
LL	4	Marius Antonescu		(substituted off) 26'	(substituted on) 30'
TP	3	Gheorghe Gajion		(substituted off) 60'
HK	2	Tudor Butnariu		(substituted off) 70'
LP	1	Alexandru Savin	(yellow card) 21'			(substituted off) 62'
Replacements:
HK	16	Robert Irimescu		(substituted on) 70'
PR	17	Vasile Balan		(substituted on) 26'	(substituted off) 30'	(substituted on) 62'
PR	18	Thomas Crețu		(substituted on) 60'
FL	19	Vlad Neculau	(yellow card) 80'	(substituted on) 59'
FL	20	Kemal Altinok		(substituted on) 54'
SH	21	Gabriel Rupanu		(substituted on) 62'
FB	22	Paul Popoaia		(substituted on) 62'
WG	23	Fonovai Tangimana		(substituted on) 64'
Coach:
(France) David Gérard

FB	15	Francisco Gonzalez Capdevila
RW	14	Bautista Basso
OC	13	Joaquín Suárez
IC	12	Andrés Vilaseca		(substituted off) 75'
LW	11	Juan Manuel Alonso
FH	10	Felipe Etcheverry		(substituted off) 54'
SH	9	Santiago Álvarez
N8	8	Manuel Diana		(substituted off) 49'
OF	7	Santiago Civetta		(substituted off) 49'
BF	6	Manuel Ardao
RL	5	Manuel Leindekar		(substituted off) 75'
LL	4	Felipe Aliaga (c)
TP	3	Reinaldo Piussi		(substituted off) 49'	(substituted on) 64'
HK	2	Germán Kessler		(substituted off) 49'
LP	1	Mateo Perillo		(substituted off) 49'
Replacements:
HK	16	Joaquín Myszka		(substituted on) 49'
PR	17	Francisco Suárez		(substituted on) 49'
PR	18	Ignacio Péculo		(substituted on) 49'	(substituted off) 64'
FL	19	Manuel Rosmarino		(substituted on) 75'
FL	20	Lucas Bianchi		(substituted on) 49'
FL	21	Carlos Deus	(yellow card) 54'	(substituted on) 49'
FH	22	Jean Cotarmanac'h		(substituted on) 54'
CE	23	Ícaro Amarillo		(substituted on) 75'
Coach:
(Argentina) Rodolfo Ambrosio

Assistant referees:
Ben Breakspear (Wales)
Kevin Bralley (France)
Television match official:
Aled Griffiths (Wales)

22 November 2025
15:10 GMT (UTC+0)

Wales	26–52	New Zealand
Try: Rogers (3) 9' c, 33' c, 43' c Rees-Zammit 76' m Con: Edwards (3/3) 11', 34', 44'	Report	Try: Clarke (2) 5' c, 79' c Love 29' c Williams 38'; Ioane 51' c Reece (2) 59' c, 70' c Con: McKenzie (7/7) 6', 30', 39', 52', 60', 71', 80'; Pen: McKenzie (1/1) 13'

Millennium Stadium, Cardiff
Attendance: 68,388
Referee: Hollie Davidson (Scotland)

Team details

FB	15	Blair Murray
RW	14	Louis Rees-Zammit
OC	13	Max Llewellyn
IC	12	Joe Hawkins
LW	11	Tom Rogers		(substituted off) 55'
FH	10	Dan Edwards		(substituted off) 68'
SH	9	Tomos Williams		(substituted off) 68'
N8	8	Taine Plumtree	(yellow card) 67'
OF	7	Harri Deaves		(substituted off) 64'	(substituted on) 75'
BF	6	Alex Mann
RL	5	Adam Beard		(substituted off) 72'
LL	4	Dafydd Jenkins
TP	3	Keiron Assiratti		(substituted off) 52'
HK	2	Dewi Lake (c)		(substituted off) 77'
LP	1	Rhys Carré	(substituted off) 52'	(substituted on) 64'	(substituted off) 68'
Replacements:
HK	16	Brodie Coghlan		(substituted on) 77'
PR	17	Gareth Thomas	(yellow card) 58'	(substituted on) 52'
PR	18	Archie Griffin		(substituted on) 52'
LK	19	Freddie Thomas		(substituted on) 72'
N8	20	Morgan Morse		(substituted on) 68'	(substituted off) 75'
SH	21	Kieran Hardy		(substituted on) 68'
FH	22	Jarrod Evans		(substituted on) 68'
CE	23	Nick Tompkins		(substituted on) 55'
Coach:
(Wales) Steve Tandy

FB	15	Ruben Love	(substituted off) 55'
RW	14	Will Jordan
OC	13	Rieko Ioane
IC	12	Anton Lienert-Brown	(substituted off) 69'
LW	11	Caleb Clarke
FH	10	Damian McKenzie
SH	9	Cortez Ratima	(substituted off) 55'
N8	8	Wallace Sititi
OF	7	Du'Plessis Kirifi	(substituted off) 68'
BF	6	Simon Parker
RL	5	Fabian Holland	(substituted off) 64'
LL	4	Scott Barrett (c)
TP	3	Pasilio Tosi	(substituted off) 55'
HK	2	Samisoni Taukei'aho	(substituted off) 65'
LP	1	Tamaiti Williams	(substituted off) 55'
Replacements:
HK	16	George Bell	(substituted on) 65'
PR	17	Fletcher Newell	(substituted on) 55'
PR	18	George Bower	(substituted on) 55'
LK	19	Josh Lord	(substituted on) 64'
FL	20	Christian Lio-Willie	(substituted on) 68'
SH	21	Finlay Christie	(substituted on) 55'
CE	22	Leicester Faingaʻanuku	(substituted on) 69'
WG	23	Sevu Reece	(substituted on) 55'
Coach:
(New Zealand) Scott Robertson

Player of the Match:
Wallace Sititi (New Zealand)

Assistant referees:
Andrea Piardi (Italy)
Gianluca Gnecchi (Italy)
Television match official:
Ian Tempest (England)
Foul play review officer:
Matteo Liperini (Italy)

Notes:

- Brodie Coghlan, Harri Deaves, and Morgan Morse (all Wales) made their international debuts.
- Tom Rogers became the first Welsh player, and just the fourth player in history, to score a hat-trick against New Zealand.
- Wales scored their most points against New Zealand in a home test match.

22 November 2025
17:00 CET (UTC+1)

Spain	33–41	Fiji
Try: Bay (2) 19' c, 51' c Laforga 40+1' m Boronat 63' m Con: López-Bontempo (2/4) 20', 53'; Pen: López-Bontempo (3/5) 27', 47', 55'	Report	Try: Canakaivata 23' c Kuruvoli (2) 30' c, 48' c Doge 67' c Nasova 74' c Con: Armstrong-Ravula (5/5) 24', 25', 49', 68', 75'; Pen: Armstrong-Ravula (2/2) 60', 78'

Estadio Ciudad de Málaga, Málaga
Attendance: 7,500
Referee: Damian Schneider (Argentina)

Team details

FB	15	J. W. Bell
RW	14	Alejandro Laforga
OC	13	Iñaki Mateu	(substituted off) 54'
IC	12	Gonzalo López-Bontempo
LW	11	Alberto Carmona	(substituted off) 66'
FH	10	Gonzalo Vinuesa
SH	9	Estanislao Bay
N8	8	Raphaël Nieto
OF	7	Manex Ariceta
BF	6	Mario Pichardie	(substituted off) 56'
RL	5	Antonio Suárez	(substituted off) 54'
LL	4	Matthew Foulds (c)
TP	3	Hugo Pirlet	(substituted off) 65'
HK	2	Santiago Ovejero	(substituted off) 73'
LP	1	Thierry Futeu	(substituted off) 60'	(substituted on) 68'
Replacements:
HK	16	Pablo Miejimolle	(substituted on) 73'
PR	17	Bernardo Vasquez	(substituted on) 60'	(substituted off) 68'
PR	18	Joaquín Domínguez	(substituted on) 65'
LK	19	Ignacio Piñeiro	(substituted on) 54'
FL	20	Vicente Boronat	(substituted on) 56'
SH	21	Pablo Pérez
FL	22	Matheo Triki	(substituted on) 54'
CE	23	Yago Fernández	(substituted on) 66'
Coach:
(Argentina) Pablo Bouza

FB	15	Seta Tuicuvu		(substituted off) 53'
RW	14	Joji Nasova
OC	13	Sireli Maqala		(substituted off) 53'
IC	12	Vilimoni Botitu
LW	11	Jiuta Wainiqolo
FH	10	Isaiah Armstrong-Ravula
SH	9	Simione Kuruvoli		(substituted off) 78'
N8	8	Pita Gus Sowakula		(substituted off) 56'
OF	7	Elia Canakaivata
BF	6	Mesake Vocevoce
RL	5	Setareki Turagacoke		(substituted off) 45'
LL	4	Isoa Nasilasila
TP	3	Tim Hoyt		(substituted off) 45'
HK	2	Tevita Ikanivere (c)		(substituted off) 78'
LP	1	Haereiti Hetet		(substituted off) 53'
Replacements:
HK	16	Kavaia Tagivetaua	(yellow card) 79'	(substituted on) 78'
PR	17	Atunaisa Sokobale		(substituted on) 53'
PR	18	Mesake Doge		(substituted on) 45'
LK	19	Temo Mayanavanua		(substituted on) 56'
FL	20	Motikai Murray		(substituted on) 45'
SH	21	Philip Baselala		(substituted on) 78'
FH	22	Caleb Muntz		(substituted on) 53'
WG	23	Kalaveti Ravouvou		(substituted on) 53'
Coach:
(Australia) Mick Byrne

Assistant referees:
Federico Vedovelli (Italy)
George Selwood (England)
Television match official:
Quinton Immelman (South Africa)

Notes:

- Yago Fernández, Antonio Suárez (both Spain) and Kavaia Tagivetaua (Fiji) made their international debuts.

22 November 2025
16:00 WET (UTC-0)

Portugal	33–27	Canada
Try: Martins 40' c Vasconcelos 42' c Marta 64' c Con: Vareiro (3/3) 40+1', 43', 65'; Pen: Vareiro (4/5) 7', 19', 25', 56'	Report	Try: Flesch 29' c Di Nardo 51' m Con: Povey (1/2) 30'; Pen: Povey (4/5) 10', 16', 39', 60'; Nelson (1/1) 70'

Estádio Cidade de Coimbra, Coimbra
Referee: Morné Ferreira (South Africa)

Team details

FB	15	Vincent Pinto
RW	14	Raffaele Storti
OC	13	Rodrigo Marta
IC	12	Guilherme Vasconcelos		(substituted off) 78'
LW	11	Simão Bento
FH	10	Manuel Vareiro
SH	9	Tomas Amado		(substituted off) 46'
N8	8	David Wallis (c)
OF	7	Nicolas Martins
BF	6	Francisco Almeida		(substituted off) 56'
RL	5	Duarte Torgal		(substituted off) 65'
LL	4	Duarte Nunes
TP	3	Cody Thomas		(substituted off) 56'
HK	2	Luka Begic		(substituted off) 56'
LP	1	Luis Lopes		(substituted off) 56'
Replacements:
PR	16	Abel Da Cunha		(substituted on) 56'
HK	17	Nuno Mascarenhas		(substituted on) 56'
PR	18	Antonio Prim		(substituted on) 56'
LK	19	Martim Belo		(substituted on) 65'
N8	20	Vasco Baptista	(yellow card) 69'	(substituted on) 56'
SH	21	Hugo Camacho		(substituted on) 46'
FH	22	Hugo Aubry
CE	23	Martim Faro		(substituted on) 78'
Coach:
(New Zealand) Simon Mannix

FB	15	Cooper Coats
RW	14	Morgan Di Nardo
OC	13	Spencer Jones	(substituted off) 65'
IC	12	Kyle Tremblay
LW	11	Nic Benn
FH	10	Robbie Povey	(substituted off) 69'
SH	9	Brock Gallagher	(substituted off) 65'
N8	8	Matthew Oworu
OF	7	Lucas Rumball (c)
BF	6	Mason Flesch	(substituted off) 36'
RL	5	Izzak Kelly	(substituted off) 75'
LL	4	Piers von Dadelszen
TP	3	Matt Tierney	(substituted off) 40'
HK	2	Dewald Kotze
LP	1	Sam Miller	(substituted off) 65'
Replacements:
HK	16	Austin Creighton
PR	17	Emerson Prior	(substituted on) 65'
PR	18	Cole Keith	(substituted on) 40'
LK	19	Callum Botchar	(substituted on) 75'
FL	20	Siôn Parry	(substituted on) 36'
SH	21	James Naylor	(substituted on) 65'
CE	22	Noah Flesch	(substituted on) 65'
FB	23	Peter Nelson	(substituted on) 69'
Coach:
(Australia) Steve Meehan

Assistant referees:
Saba Abulashvili (Georgia)
Filippo Russo (Italy)
Television match official:
Marius Jonker (South Africa)

Notes:

- Martim Faro (Portugal), Morgan Di Nardo and James Naylor (both Canada) made their international debuts.

22 November 2025
20:00 EET (UTC+2)

Albania	57–0	Greece
Try: Dudi 2' m Arapi (3) 11' c, 16' m, 40' c Lallinaj 25' m Ibra 36' c Vreko 45' c Cubaj 69' c Con: Arapi (1/4) 12'; Vreko (3/3) 37', 40', 46'; Cubaj (1/1) 69'	Report

Shtepia e Futbollit, Tirana
Referee: Paulo Duarte (Portugal)

22 November 2025
17:40 WET (UTC+0)

Ireland	13–24	South Africa
Try: Sheehan 36' c Con: Crowley (1/1) 37'; Pen: S. Prendergast (2/3) 43', 55'	Report	Try: Willemse 3' m Reinach 32' c Penalty try 40+4'; Feinberg-Mngomezulu 45' m Con: Feinberg-Mngomezulu (1/3) 34'

Aviva Stadium, Dublin
Attendance: 51,700
Referee: Matthew Carley (England)

Team details

FB	15	Mack Hansen		(substituted off) 64'
RW	14	Tommy O'Brien		(substituted off) 32'
OC	13	Garry Ringrose		(substituted off) 72'
IC	12	Bundee Aki
LW	11	James Lowe
FH	10	Sam Prendergast	(yellow card) 33'
SH	9	Jamison Gibson-Park
N8	8	Caelan Doris (c)
OF	7	Josh van der Flier		(substituted off) 40+3'	(substituted on) 49'		(substituted off) 62'	(substituted on) 72'
BF	6	Ryan Baird		(substituted off) 60'
RL	5	Tadhg Beirne
LL	4	James Ryan		Red card
TP	3	Tadhg Furlong		(substituted off) 60'
HK	2	Dan Sheehan		(substituted off) 56'
LP	1	Andrew Porter	(yellow card) 40+2'			(substituted off) 60'	(substituted on) 62'	(substituted off) 72'
Replacements:
HK	16	Rónan Kelleher		(substituted on) 56'
PR	17	Paddy McCarthy	(yellow card) 61'	(substituted on) 40+3'	(substituted off) 49'	(substituted on) 60'
PR	18	Finlay Bealham		(substituted on) 60'
FL	19	Cian Prendergast		(substituted on) 39'
N8	20	Jack Conan		(substituted on) 60'
SH	21	Craig Casey		(substituted on) 72'
FH	22	Jack Crowley	(yellow card) 39'	(substituted on) 31'
CE	23	Tom Farrell		(substituted on) 64'
Coach:
(England) Andy Farrell

FB	15	Damian Willemse
RW	14	Canan Moodie
OC	13	Jesse Kriel
IC	12	Damian de Allende
LW	11	Cheslin Kolbe
FH	10	Sacha Feinberg-Mngomezulu		(substituted off) 58'
SH	9	Cobus Reinach		(substituted off) 67'
N8	8	Jasper Wiese		(substituted off) 52'
BF	7	Pieter-Steph du Toit
OF	6	Siya Kolisi (c)		(substituted off) 58'
RL	5	Ruan Nortjé
LL	4	Eben Etzebeth		(substituted off) 49'
TP	3	Thomas du Toit		(substituted off) 40+1'	(substituted on) 72'
HK	2	Malcolm Marx		(substituted off) 65'	(substituted on) 72'
LP	1	Boan Venter		(substituted off) 40+1'
Replacements:
HK	16	Johan Grobbelaar		(substituted on) 65'	(substituted off) 72'
PR	17	Gerhard Steenekamp		(substituted on) 40+1'
PR	18	Wilco Louw		(substituted on) 40+1'	(substituted off) 72'
LK	19	RG Snyman		(substituted on) 49'
FL	20	Kwagga Smith		(substituted on) 52'
CE	21	André Esterhuizen		(substituted on) 58'
SH	22	Grant Williams	(yellow card) 79'	(substituted on) 67'
FH	23	Manie Libbok		(substituted on) 58'
Coach:
(South Africa) Rassie Erasmus

Assistant referees:
Karl Dickson (England)
Christophe Ridley (England)
Television match official:
Andrew Jackson (England)
Foul play review officer:
Dan Jones (England)

Notes:

- Tom Farrell (Ireland) made his international debut.
- RG Snyman (South Africa) earned his 50th test cap.

22 November 2025
21:10 CET (UTC+1)

France	48–33	Australia
Try: Depoortère (2) 9' c, 52' m Ramos 25' m Bielle-Biarrey (2) 31' c, 72' c Marchand 64' c Lamothe 79' c Con: Ramos (5/7) 10', 32', 65', 73', 80'; Pen: Ramos (1/1) 47'	Report	Try: Faessler (2) 3' m, 36' c Bell 21'c Jorgensen 55' c Nasser 76'; Con: Edmed (4/5) 22', 37', 56', 76'

Stade de France, Paris
Attendance: 80,000
Referee: Luke Pearce (England)

Team details

FB	15	Thomas Ramos
RW	14	Damian Penaud
OC	13	Nicolas Depoortère
IC	12	Gaël Fickou		(substituted off) 65'
LW	11	Louis Bielle-Biarrey
FH	10	Romain Ntamack
SH	9	Maxime Lucu	(yellow card) 35'	(substituted off) 74'
N8	8	Grégory Alldritt (c)		(substituted off) 65'
OF	7	Charles Ollivon		(substituted off) 16'
BF	6	Anthony Jelonch
RL	5	Emmanuel Meafou		(substituted off) 65'
LL	4	Thibaud Flament
TP	3	Régis Montagne		(substituted off) 65'
HK	2	Julien Marchand		(substituted off) 65'
LP	1	Jean-Baptiste Gros		(substituted off) 65'
Replacements:
HK	16	Maxime Lamothe		(substituted on) 65'
PR	17	Rodrigue Neti		(substituted on) 65'
PR	18	Thomas Laclayat		(substituted on) 65'
LK	19	Romain Taofifénua		(substituted on) 65'
LK	20	Hugo Auradou		(substituted on) 65'
FL	21	Oscar Jégou		(substituted on) 16'
SH	22	Baptiste Jauneau		(substituted on) 74'
CE	23	Kalvin Gourgues		(substituted on) 65'
Coach:
(France) Fabien Galthié

FB	15	Max Jorgensen
RW	14	Harry Potter
OC	13	Joseph Sua'ali'i	(substituted off) 57'
IC	12	Len Ikitau
LW	11	Dylan Pietsch
FH	10	Tane Edmed
SH	9	Jake Gordon	(substituted off) 74'
N8	8	Harry Wilson (c)	(substituted off) 55'
OF	7	Fraser McReight	(substituted off) 65'
BF	6	Tom Hooper (yellow card) 64'
RL	5	Nick Frost
LL	4	Jeremy Williams
TP	3	Taniela Tupou	(substituted off) 41'
HK	2	Matt Faessler	(substituted off) 53'
LP	1	Angus Bell	(substituted off) 57'
Replacements:
HK	16	Josh Nasser	(substituted on) 53'
PR	17	Aidan Ross	(substituted on) 57'
PR	18	Allan Alaalatoa	(substituted on) 41'
FL	19	Rob Valetini	(substituted on) 55'
FL	20	Carlo Tizzano	(substituted on) 65'
SH	21	Kalani Thomas	(substituted on) 74'
CE	22	Hamish Stewart
WG	23	Filipo Daugunu	(substituted on) 57'
Coach:
(New Zealand) Joe Schmidt

Player of the Match:
Nicolas Depoortère (France)

Assistant referees:
Andrew Brace (Ireland)
Craig Evans (Wales)
Television match official:
Marius van der Westhuizen (South Africa)
Foul play review officer:
Mike Adamson (Scotland)

Notes:

- Kalvin Gourgues (France) and Kalani Thomas (Australia) made their international debuts.
- With this loss for Australia, the Wallabies went winless on a European tour for the first time since 1958, and suffered 10 test defeats for the first time in a single calendar year.

22 November 2025
21:10 CET (UTC+1)

Italy	34–19	Chile
Try: Capuozzo 12' c Di Bartolomeo (2) 34' m, 53' c Ioane (2) 62' c, 72' m Con: Da Re (3/5) 12', 54', 63'; Pen: Da Re (1/2) 24'	Report	Try: Lues 40' c Saab 48' c C. Saavedra 80' m Con: Salas (2/3) 41', 49'; Pen: Salas (0/1)

Stadio Luigi Ferraris, Genoa
Attendance: 12,011
Referee: Adam Leal (England)

Team details

FB	15	Ange Capuozzo
RW	14	Mirko Belloni
OC	13	Tommaso Menoncello	(substituted off) 64'
IC	12	Leonardo Marin
LW	11	Monty Ioane	(substituted off) 73'
FH	10	Giacomo Da Re	(substituted off) 13'	(substituted on) 22'
SH	9	Alessandro Garbisi	(substituted off) 49'
N8	8	Lorenzo Cannone
OF	7	Michele Lamaro (c)	(substituted off) 55'	(substituted on) 63'
BF	6	Alessandro Izekor	(substituted off) 33'	(substituted on) 40'	(substituted off) 63'
RL	5	Federico Ruzza
LL	4	Niccolò Cannone	(substituted off) 74'
TP	3	Simone Ferrari	(substituted off) 64'
HK	2	Tommaso Di Bartolomeo	(substituted off) 21'	(substituted on) 32'	(substituted off) 53'
LP	1	Muhamed Hasa	(substituted off) 47'
Replacements:
HK	16	Pablo Dimcheff	(substituted on) 21'	(substituted off) 32'	(substituted on) 53'
PR	17	Danilo Fischetti	(substituted on) 47'
PR	18	Giosuè Zilocchi	(substituted on) 64'
LK	19	Enoch Opoku-Gyamfi	(substituted on) 74'
FL	20	Manuel Zuliani	(substituted on) 33'	(substituted off) 4-'	(substituted on) 55'
SH	21	Martin Page-Relo	(substituted on) 49'
CE	22	Ignacio Brex	(substituted on) 13'	(substituted off) 22'	(substituted on) 64'
CE	23	Edoardo Todaro	(substituted on) 73'
Coach:
(Argentina) Gonzalo Quesada

FB	15	Matías Garafulic
RW	14	Clemente Armstrong
OC	13	Domingo Saavedra
IC	12	Santiago Videla		(substituted off) 13'
LW	11	Nicolas Saab
FH	10	Juan Cruz Reyes
SH	9	Lucas Berti		(substituted off) 67'
N8	8	Alfonso Escobar
OF	7	Clemente Saavedra (c)	(yellow card) 35'
BF	6	Ernesto Tchimino		(substituted off) 55'
RL	5	Javier Eissmann		(substituted off) 77'
LL	4	Santiago Pedrero		(substituted off) 34'
TP	3	Iñaki Gurruchaga		(substituted off) 56'
HK	2	Augusto Böhme		(substituted off) 52'
LP	1	Javier Carrasco		(substituted off) 36'
Replacements:
HK	16	Raimundo Martínez		(substituted on) 52'
PR	17	Salvador Lues		(substituted on) 36'
PR	18	Matìas Dittus		(substituted on) 56'
LK	19	Bruno Saez		(substituted on) 34'
FL	20	Augusto Villanueva		(substituted on) 77'
SH	21	Sebastian Bianchi		(substituted on) 67'
FH	22	Tomas Salas		(substituted on) 13'
FL	23	Joaquin Milesi		(substituted on) 55'
Coach:
(Uruguay) Pablo Lemoine

Player of the Match:
Niccolò Cannone (Italy)

Assistant referees:
Adam Jones (Wales)
Ben Connor (Wales)
Television match official:
Ben Whitehouse (Wales)
Foul play review officer:
Stuart Terheege (England)

- Enoch Opoku-Gyamfi, Edoardo Todaro (both Italy) and Sebastian Bianchi (Chile) made their international debuts.
- This was the first meeting between the two sides.

23 November 2025
13:40 GMT (UTC+0)

Scotland	56–0	Tonga
Try: Ritchie 10' c Turner 13' c Williamson 23' c Van der Merwe 59' c Ashman (2) 66' c, 79' c Horne (2) 69' c, 74' c Con: Burke (5/5) 11', 14, 23', 60', 66'; Horne (3/3) 69', 75', 80'	Report

Murrayfield Stadium, Edinburgh
Attendance: 60,374
Referee: Luc Ramos (France)

Team details

FB	15	Tom Jordan
RW	14	Kyle Rowe
OC	13	Ollie Smith
IC	12	Sione Tuipulotu (c)	(substituted off) 55'
LW	11	Duhan van der Merwe
FH	10	Fergus Burke	(substituted off) 67'
SH	9	Ben White	(substituted off) 55'
N8	8	Magnus Bradbury
OF	7	Jamie Ritchie
BF	6	Andy Onyeama-Christie	(substituted off) 61'
RL	5	Max Williamson	(substituted off) 55'
LL	4	Alex Samuel
TP	3	Zander Fagerson	(substituted off) 48'
HK	2	George Turner	(substituted off) 47'
LP	1	Rory Sutherland	(substituted off) 48'
Replacements:
HK	16	Ewan Ashman	(substituted on) 47'
PR	17	Nathan McBeth	(substituted on) 48'
PR	18	Will Hurd	(substituted on) 48'
LK	19	Marshall Sykes	(substituted on) 55'
FL	20	Josh Bayliss	(substituted on) 61'
SH	21	George Horne	(substituted on) 55'
CE	22	Stafford McDowall	(substituted on) 55'
WG	23	Kyle Steyn	(substituted on) 67'
Coach:
(Scotland) Gregor Townsend

FB	15	William Havili
RW	14	Taniela Filimone	(yellow card) 49'
OC	13	Fine Inisi	(yellow card) 58'	(substituted off) 23'	(substituted on) 35'
IC	12	Solomone Kata
LW	11	John Tapueluelu				(substituted off) 57'
FH	10	Patrick Pellegrini		(substituted off) 70'
SH	9	Sonatane Takulua		(substituted off) 65'
N8	8	Lotu Inisi
BF	7	Siosiua Moala		(substituted off) 52'
OF	6	Semisi Paea	Red card
RL	5	Veikoso Poloniati	(yellow card) 40'
LL	4	Harison Mataele
TP	3	Ben Tameifuna (c)		(substituted off) 57'
HK	2	Siua Maile		(substituted off) 52'
LP	1	Siegfried Fisiʻihoi		(substituted off) 52'
Replacements:
HK	16	Sam Moli		(substituted on) 52'
PR	17	Fatongia Paea		(substituted on) 52'
PR	18	Phillip Kite		(substituted on) 57'
LK	19	Sitaleki Timani		(substituted on) 25'
FL	20	Fotu Lokotui		(substituted on) 52'
SH	21	Aisea Halo		(substituted on) 65'
CE	22	Tima Faingaʻanuku		(substituted on) 70'
WG	23	Anzelo Tuitavuki		(substituted on) 23'	(substituted off) 35'	(substituted on) 57'
Coach:
Tevita Tuʻifua

Player of the Match:
Magnus Bradbury (Scotland)

Assistant referees:
Evan Urruzmendi (France)
Benoît Rousselet (France)
Television match official:
Tual Trainini (France)
Foul play review officer:
Olly Hodges (Ireland)

Notes:

- George Turner (Scotland) earned his 50th test cap.
- Fatongia Paea and Sitaleki Timani (both Tonga) made their international debuts.
- Sitaleki Timani at the age of 39, became the oldest debutant to play for one of the leading rugby nations.
- This was Scotland's largest winning margin over Tonga and the first time they nilled Tonga.

23 November 2025
16:10 GMT (UTC+0)

England	27–23	Argentina
Try: Ojomoh 10' c Feyi-Waboso 25' c Slade 66' c Con: Ford (3/3) 10', 26', 67'; Pen: Ford (1/2) 73'; Drop: Ford (1/2) 9'	Report	Try: Piccardo 45' c Isgró 79' c Con: Albornoz (1/1) 46'; Carreras (1/1) 80'; Pen: Albornoz (2/2) 35', 51'; Carreras (1/2) 60'

Twickenham Stadium, London
Attendance: 80,807
Referee: Pierre Brousset (France)

Team details

FB	15	Freddie Steward
RW	14	Immanuel Feyi-Waboso
OC	13	Henry Slade
IC	12	Max Ojomoh
LW	11	Elliot Daly
FH	10	George Ford
SH	9	Ben Spencer		(substituted off) 60'
N8	8	Ben Earl
OF	7	Sam Underhill		(substituted off) 51'
BF	6	Guy Pepper		(substituted off) 51'
RL	5	Alex Coles	(yellow card) 79'
LL	4	Maro Itoje (c)		(substituted off) 73'
TP	3	Asher Opoku-Fordjour		(substituted off) 51'
HK	2	Luke Cowan-Dickie		(substituted off) 73'
LP	1	Ellis Genge		(substituted off) 51'
Replacements:
HK	16	Theo Dan		(substituted on) 73'
PR	17	Fin Baxter		(substituted on) 51'
PR	18	Will Stuart		(substituted on) 51'
LK	19	Charlie Ewels		(substituted on) 72'
FL	20	Tom Curry		(substituted on) 51'
FL	21	Henry Pollock		(substituted on) 51'
SH	22	Alex Mitchell		(substituted on) 60'
FH	23	Marcus Smith
Coach:
(England) Steve Borthwick

FB	15	Juan Cruz Mallía	(substituted off) 76'
RW	14	Rodrigo Isgró
OC	13	Matias Moroni
IC	12	Justo Piccardo
LW	11	Bautista Delguy
FH	10	Tomás Albornoz	(substituted off) 9'	(substituted on) 22'	(substituted off) 51'
SH	9	Simón Benítez Cruz	(substituted off) 51'
N8	8	Santiago Grondona	(substituted off) 46'
OF	7	Marcos Kremer	(substituted off) 46'	(substituted on) 53'	(substituted off) 64'
BF	6	Juan Martín González
RL	5	Pedro Rubiolo
LL	4	Guido Petti	(substituted off) 60'
TP	3	Pedro Delgado	(substituted off) 46'
HK	2	Julian Montoya (c)	(substituted off) 67'
LP	1	Thomas Gallo	(substituted off) 60'
Replacements:
HK	16	Ignacio Ruiz	(substituted on) 60'
PR	17	Boris Wenger	(substituted on) 67'
PR	18	Tomas Rapetti	(substituted on) 46'
LK	19	Franco Molina	(substituted on) 60'
FL	20	Pablo Matera	(substituted on) 46'	(substituted off) 53'	(substituted on) 64'
FL	21	Joaquín Oviedo	(substituted on) 46'
SH	22	Agustín Moyano	(substituted on) 51'
FH	23	Santiago Carreras	(substituted on) 9'	(substituted off) 22'	(substituted on) 51'
Coach:
(Argentina) Felipe Contepomi

Player of the Match:
Max Ojomoh (England)

Assistant referees:
Nika Amashukeli (Georgia)
Sam Grove-White (Scotland)
Television match official:
Eric Gauzins (France)
Foul play review officer:
Matteo Liperini (Italy)

Notes:

- This was the first time England has gone undefeated during their Autumn campaign since 2021, and their first when playing four tests since 2016.

=== 29 November ===
29 November 2025
15:10 GMT (UTC+0)

Wales	0–73	South Africa
		Try: Steenekamp 9' c Hooker 14' c Wiese 31' c Louw 42' c Van den Berg 44' c Feinberg-Mngomezulu (2) 46' c, 63' c Moodie 49' c Esterhuizen 54' m Nortjé 69' c Etzebeth 74' m Con: Feinberg-Mngomezulu (9/11) 10', 15', 32', 44', 44', 47', 50', 64', 70'

Millennium Stadium, Cardiff
Attendance: 50,112
Referee: Luc Ramos (France)

Team details

FB	15	Blair Murray		(substituted off) 66'
RW	14	Ellis Mee
OC	13	Joe Roberts
IC	12	Joe Hawkins
LW	11	Rio Dyer
FH	10	Dan Edwards		(substituted off) 50'
SH	9	Kieran Hardy		(substituted off) 50'
N8	8	Aaron Wainwright	(yellow card) 54'	(substituted off) 43'	(substituted on) 50'
OF	7	Alex Mann
BF	6	Taine Plumtree	(yellow card) 43'
RL	5	Rhys Davies		(substituted off) 61'
LL	4	Ben Carter
TP	3	Keiron Assiratti		(substituted off) 44'
HK	2	Dewi Lake (c)		(substituted off) 78'
LP	1	Gareth Thomas		(substituted off) 50'
Replacements:
HK	16	Brodie Coghlan		(substituted on) 78'
PR	17	Danny Southworth		(substituted on) 50'
PR	18	Christian Coleman		(substituted on) 44'
LK	19	James Ratti		(substituted on) 61'
N8	20	Morgan Morse		(substituted on) 43'	(substituted off) 50'
SH	21	Reuben Morgan-Williams		(substituted on) 50'
FH	22	Callum Sheedy		(substituted on) 50'
CE	23	Ben Thomas		(substituted on) 66'
Coach:
(Wales) Steve Tandy

FB	15	Damian Willemse
RW	14	Ethan Hooker
OC	13	Damian de Allende
IC	12	André Esterhuizen
LW	11	Canan Moodie
FH	10	Sacha Feinberg-Mngomezulu
SH	9	Morné van den Berg		(substituted off) 51'
N8	8	Jasper Wiese		(substituted off) 51'
OF	7	Franco Mostert		(substituted off) 51'
BF	6	Siya Kolisi (c)		(substituted off) 51'
RL	5	Ruan Nortjé
LL	4	Jean Kleyn		(substituted off) 51'
TP	3	Wilco Louw		(substituted off) 51'
HK	2	Johan Grobbelaar		(substituted off) 51'
LP	1	Gerhard Steenekamp		(substituted off) 51'
Replacements:
HK	16	Bongi Mbonambi		(substituted on) 51'
PR	17	Zachary Porthen		(substituted on) 51'
PR	18	Asenathi Ntlabakanye		(substituted on) 51'
LK	19	Eben Etzebeth	(red card) 79'	(substituted on) 51'
FL	20	Marco van Staden		(substituted on) 51'
FL	21	Ben-Jason Dixon		(substituted on) 51'
N8	22	Kwagga Smith		(substituted on) 51'
SH	23	Cobus Reinach		(substituted on) 51'
Coach:
(South Africa) Rassie Erasmus

Player of the Match:
André Esterhuizen (South Africa)

Assistant referees:
Matthew Carley (England)
Pierre Brousset (France)
Television match official:
Eric Gauzins (France)
Foul play review officer:
Andrew Jackson (England)

Notes:

- Danny Southworth (Wales) made his international debut.
- Cobus Reinach (South Africa) earned his 50th test cap.
- This was South Africa's largest winning margin, and most points scored, away to Wales; surpassing the previous records both set in 2023 (36-point margin and 52 points scored).
- This was Wales' heaviest home defeat and the most points conceded on their home ground, surpassing records both previously set against England (54-point margin and 68 points conceded) during the 2025 Six Nations Championship.
- This was Wales' second heaviest defeat ever, their first coming to South Africa in 1998. Rassie Erasmus, the current South African head coach, was a player in that squad.
- This was the first time Wales have been nilled in a home test match since their 3–0 loss to Ireland during the 1967 Five Nations Championship.
- This was the first time South Africa have gone undefeated during the November internationals, when playing four or more tests, since 1997.
- South Africa retained the Prince William Cup.

== See also ==
- 2025 mid-year rugby union tests
- 2027 Men's Rugby World Cup qualifying
- Nations Championship
