= Guillaume Cramont =

French rugby union player

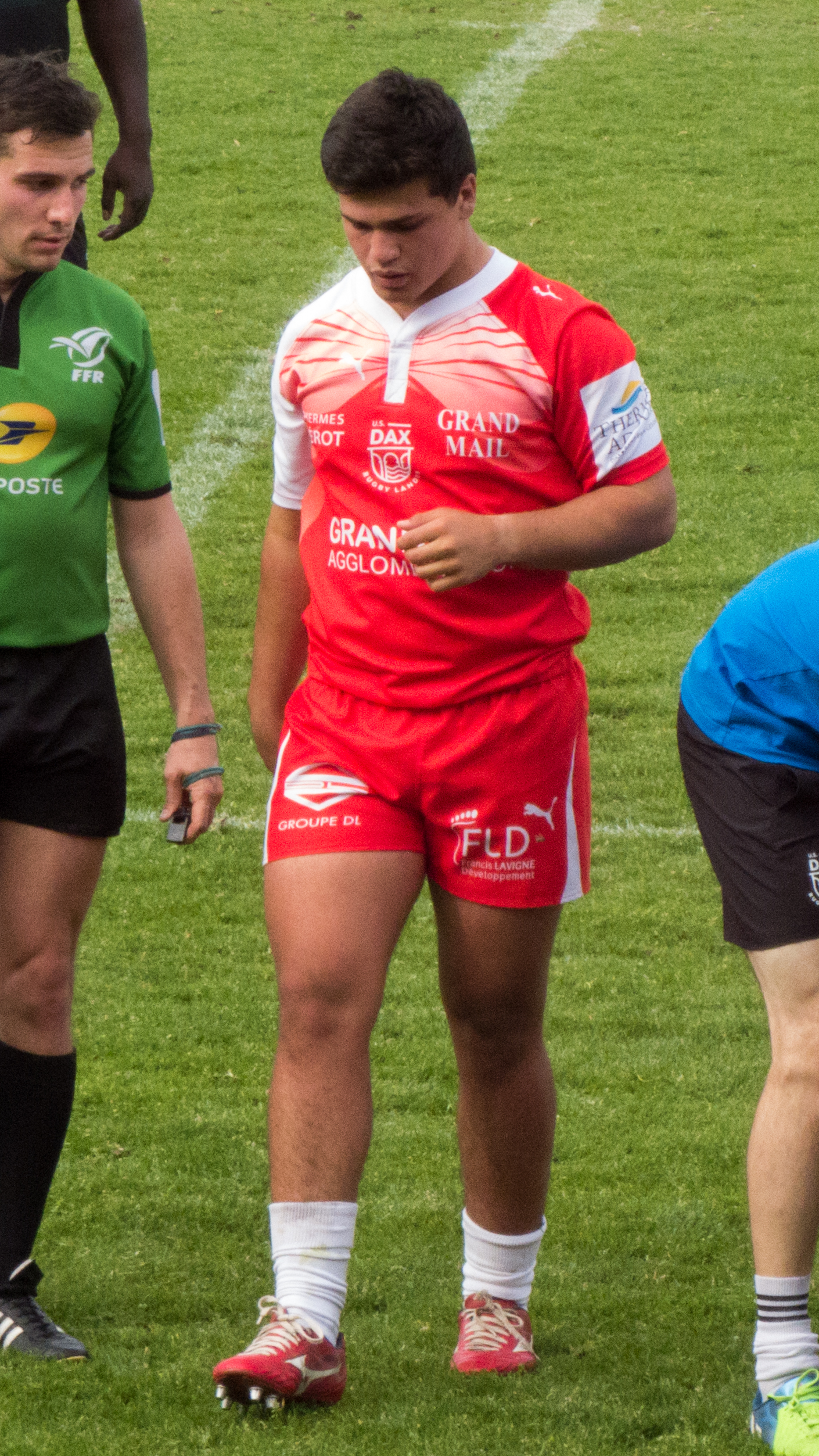
- Born: 29 December 2000 (age 25) Annemasse, France
- Height: 182 cm (6 ft 0 in)
- Weight: 107 kg (236 lb; 16 st 12 lb)

Rugby union career
- Position: Hooker
- Current team: Toulouse
Senior career
Years	Team	Apps	(Points)
2019	Dax	6	(10)
2019–	Toulouse	95	(105)
- Correct as of 14 December 2025
International career
Years	Team	Apps	(Points)
2020	France U20	3	(0)
2025–	France	1	(0)
- Correct as of 14 December 2025

Guillaume Cramont (born 29 December 2000) is a French rugby union player, who plays for Toulouse. His preferred position is hooker.

== Early career ==
Cramont was born in Annemasse to a Swiss mother and French father, however they moved to Landes when he was a child. He began playing rugby aged four and soon joined the Dax academy. He originally played scrum-half before converting to hooker. Cramont represented Switzerland at U18 level, before switching to France, representing the France U20 side in 2020.

== Professional career ==
Cramont was called into the Dax squad during the 2018/19 season as a medical joker. He made six appearances for the side before transferring to Toulouse, joining their academy. He debuted for Toulouse in the opening round of the 2019–20 Top 14 season, again as a medical joker, against Bordeaux. He signed professionally for the side ahead of the 2020/21 season.

Cramont was called into the France for the 2025 end-of-year rugby union internationals. He made his debut for the side against South Africa.
