= Yuichiro Taniguchi =

Japanese rugby union player

- Full name: Yuichiro Taniguchi
- Born: 4 June 1998 (age 28) Sakai, Osaka, Japan
- Height: 1.78 m (5 ft 10 in)
- Weight: 106 kg (16 st 10 lb; 234 lb)

Rugby union career
- Position: Prop
- Current team: Ricoh Black Rams
Senior career
Years	Team	Apps	(Points)
2020	Sunwolves	0	(0)
2022–	Ricoh Black Rams	46	(0)
- Correct as of 1 June 2022
International career
Years	Team	Apps	(Points)
2018	Japan U20	3	(0)
- Correct as of 1 June 2022

Yuichiro Taniguchi (谷口 祐一郎, Yuichiro Taniguchi; born 4 June 1998) is a Japanese rugby union player who plays as a prop. He currently plays for Black Rams Tokyo in Japan's domestic Japan Rugby League One. He was signed to the Sunwolves squad for the 2020 Super Rugby season, but did not make an appearance for the side.
