= Atunaisa Sokobale =

Fijian rugby player (born 2005)

- Born: 10 May 2005 (age 21)
- Height: 1.89 m (6 ft 2 in)
- Weight: 110 kg (243 lb)
- School: Sigatoka Methodist College
- Notable relative: Savenaca Rawaca (brother)

Rugby union career
- Position: Loosehead Prop
- Current team: Castres Olympique
Senior career
Years	Team	Apps	(Points)
2025-	Castres		
International career
Years	Team	Apps	(Points)
2025-	Fiji		

Atunaisa Sokobale (born 10 May 2005) is a Fijian rugby union player who plays for Castres Olympique and the Fiji national rugby union team. His preferred position is prop.

== Early and personal life ==
From Navatu, in Fiji's Bua Province he is the brother of fellow Fiji rugby union international, Savenaca Rawaca, Sokobale was educated at Sigatoka Methodist College. Alongside playing rugby, he was a champion in shot put while at the college.

== Club career ==
After joining Castres Olympique in France, his performances for the club included in the European Rugby Champions Cup against Munster Rugby in the 2025–26 season.

== International career ==
Sokobale was called up to the Fiji national rugby union team in 2025. Sokobale was included on the national team replacement bench for the first time following an injury to loosehead prop Eroni Mawi prior to their match against France in November 2025. After making his debut from the bench against France, he scored his first try for Fiji later that month in a 44–33 victory over Spain in Malaga. In June 2026, he was named in the Fiji squad for the 2026 Nations Championship.
