= Manie Libbok =

South African rugby union player (born 1997)

- Libbok in 2026
- Full name: Immanuel Libbok
- Born: 15 July 1997 (age 29) Humansdorp, Eastern Cape, South Africa
- Height: 1.82 m (5 ft 11 1/2 in)
- Weight: 79 kg (174 lb)
- School: HTS Daniël Pienaar, Uitenhage; Hoërskool Outeniqua, George

Rugby union career
- Position(s): Fly-half, Fullback
- Current team: Kintetsu Liners
Youth career
- 2013: Eastern Province Kings
- 2014–2015: SWD Eagles
- 2016–2018: Blue Bulls
Senior career
Years	Team	Apps	(Points)
2016–2018	Blue Bulls XV	7	(17)
2016–2019	Blue Bulls	16	(129)
2018–2020	Bulls	35	(67)
2020–2021	Sharks	11	(18)
2020–2021	Sharks (Currie Cup)	7	(0)
2021–2025	Stormers	69	(609)
2025–	Kintetsu Liners	14	(165)
- Correct as of 10 May 2026
International career
Years	Team	Apps	(Points)
2015	South Africa Schools	2	(0)
2016–2017	South Africa U20	10	(42)
2022–	South Africa	36	(149)
- Correct as of 13 November 2026
Medal record
Men's Rugby union
Representing South Africa
Rugby World Cup
Gold medal – first place	2023 France	Squad
Boy's rugby sevens
Commonwealth Youth Games
Gold medal – first place	2015 Apia	Team competition

Immanuel "Manie" Libbok (born 15 July 1997) is a South African professional rugby union player. His current club is the Japanese-based Hanazono Kintetsu Liners. Libbok holds the record for most points scored in a single Japanese club rugby game ever at 37 points. He is also the only fly-half in history to orchestrate in two consecutive appearances, back-to-back record victories against the New Zealand, All Blacks. Doing so in his first and only start and in his follow up appearance.

== Early life ==
Born on 15 July 1997 in Humansdorp, a small town in South Africa's Eastern Cape province. His early life was characterized by his street-level rugby roots and the significant support from his mother and late grandmother. He attended Graslaagte Primary School before his notable talent led him to HTS Daniël Pienaar in Uitenhage, where he earned his initial provincial selection for the Eastern Province under-16 team. He competed in the 2013 Grant Khomo Week in Vanderbijlpark, where he famously scored tries against the Blue Bulls and the Golden Lions.

This early success was a major catalyst for his career, leading to his move to Hoërskool Outeniqua in George, Western Cape the following year to further his development. His time at the "Kwaggas" was marked by three major achievements: representing the SWD Eagles, he competed in the Under-18 Craven Week for two consecutive years (2014–15). In the 2015 tournament in Stellenbosch, he finished tied for second-most tries (4) and top point scorer from three matches in the tournament. These standout performances earned him a call up to the South Africa Schools team for the Under-18 International Series where he starred at both wing and fly-half, helping the team finish the series unbeaten.

== Career ==
=== 2013–2015: Schoolboy rugby ===
Born in Humansdorp, he attended HTS Daniël Pienaar in Uitenhage, where he earned his first provincial selection in 2013, representing Eastern Province at the Under-16 Grant Khomo Week, scoring tries in matches against the Blue Bulls and the Golden Lions.

Libbok moved to George for 2014, where he attended Hoërskool Outeniqua. He represented the George-based SWD Eagles at the premier South African high schools rugby union tournament, the Under-18 Craven Week, in both 2014 and 2015. In the first match at the 2015 tournament held in Stellenbosch, Libbok scored two tries, four conversions and one penalty for a personal points haul of 21 points in his side's 31–41 defeat to former side Eastern Province. He followed this up with a try and four conversions against the Golden Lions and a third try and two conversions against KwaZulu-Natal in their final match. He scored a total of 43 points in three matches, making him the top scorer at the competition, while his four tries were the joint-second most in the competition, one behind Western Province's Nico Leonard.

At the conclusion of the tournament, Libbok was included in a South Africa Schools team that played in the 2015 Under-18 International Series on home soil against their counterparts from Wales, France and England. He started on the left wing in their 42–11 victory over Wales in their first match, but dropped to the bench for match against France, not getting any game time in their 12–5 victory. He returned to the starting line-up for their final match against England, helping them to a 23–16 victory to finish the series with a 100% record.

=== 2016–2017: Blue Bulls / South Africa U20 ===
After high school, Libbok moved to Pretoria to join the Blue Bulls academy. In March 2016, he was included in a South Africa Under-20 training squad, and made the cut to be named in a reduced provisional squad a week later.

Libbok was also named in the Blue Bulls squad for the 2016 Currie Cup qualification series and he made his first class debut on 8 April 2016, starting as a fullback in their 16–30 defeat to Western Province in Round One of the competition. He also started their match against a Free State XV a week later, scoring his first senior points by slotting a penalty in the 15th minute of the match, and scoring his first try in the final ten minutes which proved decisive as the Blue Bulls won the match 20–17. He also started their next match against Gauteng rivals the Golden Lions and played off the bench in their defeat to the Eastern Province Kings in Port Elizabeth.

On 10 May 2016, Libbok was included in the final South Africa Under-20 squad for the 2016 World Rugby Under 20 Championship tournament to be held in Manchester in England. He started their opening match in Pool C of the tournament in the fly-half position, scoring a try as South Africa came from behind to beat Japan 59–19. He switched positions with fullback Curwin Bosch for their second pool match, a 13–19 defeat to Argentina, but reverted to fly-half as South Africa bounced back to secure a 40-31 bonus-point victory over France in their final pool match, with Libbok scoring his second try of the competition just after the hour mark. The result meant South Africa secured a semi-final place as the best runner-up in the competition, and Libbok started their semi-final match as they faced three-time champions England. The hosts proved too strong for South Africa, knocking them out of the competition with a 39–17 victory, and they also lost the third-place play-off match against Argentina, with the South American side beating South Africa for the second time in the tournament, convincingly winning 49–19 to condemn South Africa to fourth place in the competition. Libbok scored his third try of the competition in the defeat, to finish the competition with three tries, the joint-most by a South African player with Zain Davids and Edwill van der Merwe.

Libbok returned to domestic action for the Blue Bulls U19 team in the 2016 Under-19 Provincial Championship. He made seven starts in the competition, scoring three tries during the season – one against Leopards U19 and two against Eastern Province U19 – as well as 35 points with the boot through 16 conversions and one penalty. He finished the competition as the Blue Bulls' second-highest points scorer, and helped them to second place on the log to secure a semi-final spot, at which stage they lost to Golden Lions U19. He also made a single start for the Blue Bulls U21 team in the 2016 Under-21 Provincial Championship, scoring a try in a 52–38 victory over Leopards U21.

In November 2016, he was named in the Bulls Super Rugby team's extended training squad during the team's preparations for the 2017 Super Rugby season. After 6 appearances from the bench, coach John Mitchell gave the then 20 year old his first start at fly-half against the Jaguares in Argentina. With Springboks incumbent pivot Handré Pollard moving to inside centre for injured captain Burger Odendal.

=== 2020–2021: Sharks ===
Libbok joined the Sharks from the Bulls in 2020, seeking more game time, he was described by then coach, Sean Everitt, as a "tricky customer with X-factor." He made his official debut for the Sharks at fullback against the Lions in Durban during the opening round of the 2020 Vodacom Super Rugby Unlocked tournament contributing to a 19-16 win on 9 October 2020.

=== 2021–2025: Stormers ===
Libbok debuted for the Stormers in 2021, in Italy facing Benetton in a losing effort after the home side made a second half comeback. He went on to feature prominently for the Cape outfit after impressing coach, John Dobson. The Stormers, only lost 4 games leading into the knockout stages for that season. During a semi-final clash against Irish side, Ulster, where the visitors were leading by 5 points after the hooter already sounded. Libbok made a skip pass assisting Warrick Gelant to score a try leveling the scoreboard. Libbok made the conversion from the touchline sending his team into the finals of the inaugural United Rugby Championship. In the final, he faced his former club the Bulls, and kicked a drop goal to extend a small lead which proved decisive to ultimately securing the title. He was the leading point scorer, accumulating 171 points. A feat he replicated the following season, scoring 217 points but failed to win the trophy a second time in the final after two man of the match performances in both the quarter- and semi-finals. Libbok was named DHL Stormers Player of the Year on 25 October 2022 as well as the 2022-23 season's URC Player of the Season for South Africa, succeeding teammate Evan Roos who won the inaugural honour.

=== 2025-: Kintetsu Liners ===
On July 22, Libbok's signing was officially announced by the Japanese outfit after reports had been making rounds since March. Initial reports hinted at a sabbatical request, but it turned out to be a long-term endeavor after Libbok announced his departure from the Stormers. He was signed with the Cape outfit until 2027 and according to coach, John Dobson, wanted to honour his contract. Dobson, whom had been very vocal about having both Libbok and Sacha Feinberg-Mngomezulu, said that it was impossible for both of them to coexist at the franchise. He also mentioned the latter's request one year prior to only play fly-half and mentioned that he doesn't desire to play from the bench. Therefore, Libbok's offer couldn't have come at a more opportune time. Dobson, declared that Manie leaves with their blessing and an open invitation to return in the future.

Libbok made his first appearance for his new club in a pre-season match playing the first 40 minutes. On December 13, he made his official Japan Rugby League One debut against the Shuttles Aichi in the second division scoring 4/4 conversions in a 40-14 victory. The following week, Libbok played his first game for his new club at their home Hanazono Rugby Stadium in Osaka against NEC Green Rockets in a 40-10 victory. On January 10, Libbok made his first start at fullback since his days at the Sharks, with 丸山 凜太朗(Rintaro Maruyama) at pivot against the Hino Red Dolphins. He played at sweeper for 52 minutes before moving mid-game back to standoff. He kicked 12 points in a 47-34 victory. On January 17, he was once again back at fly-half in their away game against Red Hurricanes Osaka, a local derby where they emerged victorious once more winning 40-35. On February 7, Libbok made his fifth consecutive appearance for his new team in an away game against Shimizu Koto Blue Sharks. The two undefeated teams clashed in difficult conditions. Libbok added 2 penalties in the first half to bring the deficit to 1 point going into half-time. The second half was just as tightly contested given the conditions. However, the Liners were able to grind out a victory after Libbok delivered two pinpoint cross-kicks to both wingers using both feet, resulting in a 95-meter try scored by replacement scrum-half, Kensho Kawamura, who were deputizing on the wing, winning 16-14 and extending their undefeated run. The Liners continued their unbeaten streak one week later against Kyuden Voltex in a 50-38 victory at home. Libbok scored the opening try & kicked 12 points before being replaced by Will Harrison in the 78th minute. On March 7, the Liners faced Kamaishi Seawaves at the Kamaishi Recovery Memorial Stadium in round 7th, which they lost 30-22, ending their undefeated streak. The following week, Libbok was again selected at standoff vs Kyuden Voltex. This time in an away game. They conceded 17 points early in the half. But managed to bounce back with 4 tries with Libbok converting 3 of those before receiving his first yellow card in the 33rd minute. He went on to receive a red card in the 70th minute. They won 50-48. On March 28, the Liners faced the Kamaishi Seawaves in the rematch in Osaka. After ending the Liners' undefeated run two weeks prior, the home team (Liners) avenged the loss in a 59-31 display. Libbok scored 19 points which included a try and 7 conversions. In the 10th round, the Liners faced their Osaka rivals, the Red Hurricanes, the derby lived up as the Liners only won by 5 points, 36-31. In the 11th round on April 11, the Liners clashed against Hino Red Dolphins in an away game which they won 77-36 securing a bonus point and ensuring that they remained top of the log. Libbok registered 37 points, converting all the 11 tries scored for a 100% off the tee outing. He also scored 3 for himself and assisted with 3 for teammates: captain Peter Umaga-Jensen, Ryno Pieterse & Will Harrison. With this victory, Libbok broke the 20 year record of 36 points set by Ryan Nicholas in 2006 for Japanese club competition. In the 12th round on April 25, Libbok lost his first game at their home ground in Osaka and second for the season against Shimizu Koto Blue Sharks, 19-29. The following week, Libbok suffered his first back-to-back loss since joining the Liners and third overall in an away game opposing Green Rockets in the 13th round. It was a rematch from the 2nd round losing 29-39, thereby losing their top spot on the log to rivals Shuttles. In the last match of the season against the Shuttles, the Liners lost their third consecutive match in a row 27-34. Even though they received a losing BP, due to their head-to-head match outcomes vs the Blue Sharks, they failed to qualify for the promotion/relegation playoffs. He was crowned the top points scorer for the division with 165 for the season. He ended his first season scoring 7 tries, 59 conversions, 4 penalties and 12 try assists from 14 games.

=== 2027:Sharks ===
On 5 November 2026, the Durban club announced that they have reacquired the services of Libbok, starting from July 2027. This will be the Bok playmaker's second stint at Kings Park. He cited that after discussions with head coach JP Pietersen surrounding the "new era" and the attacking direction convinced him to make the move.

== International career ==
In October 2022, he was included in the squad for the Springboks' year-end tour. He made his debut for the national team against France on November 12, receiving 4 minutes from the bench in Marseille. A fixture they lost. The following week he was once again named in the team to face Italy. He replaced Cheslin Kolbe early in the second half due to injury. He kicked 5 successful conversions in a 63-21 victory. He played his third test against England, also from the bench which they also won.

In July 2023, with long time pivot Handré Pollard still injured, Libbok was selected by then coach, Jacques Nienaber, to make his first start for the Springboks against Australia in their opening match for The Rugby Championship at Loftus Versfeld opposing Quade Cooper. The young pivot delivered a masterclass performance marshaling his team to a 43-12 victory. It also turned out to be the second to last test for the Wallaby playmaker, who would later at the Liners joke that Manie sent him into retirement. He made his debut against New Zealand from the bench at Mount Smart Stadium where Damian Willemse started at fly-half. A test they lost. Libbok found himself again in the starting team for the final fixture of their campaign against Argentina, where he scored his first try in a close encounter, winning the test, 22-21. He then featured in another test against Los Pumas including Wales, both of which they won. On August 25, Libbok made his first start against the All Blacks at Twickenham opposing Richie Mo'unga. With heavy criticism in regards to his goalkicking, Libbok kicked 5 successful conversions and showed excellent game management in a then record breaking victory against the men in black, 35-7, winning the Qatar Airways Cup. This was New Zealand's biggest defeat ever by any team at the time in their 120 years of existence.

In September of that year, he made his Rugby World Cup debut against Scotland opposing Finn Russell in what was his 10th cap. The inexperienced pivot was inconsistent from the boot only managing to land two penalties but he managed to prevent an otherwise definite try almost scored by winger Darcy Graham after a great cover tackle. And he delivered an outrageous no-look kick pass to Kurt-Lee Arendse who scored the Boks' second and final try of the day. He received the Man of the Match award on his debut in the 18-3 victory. So far undefeated as a starting fly-half for the national team and against marquee fly-halves, Libbok faced veteran pivot and Ireland captain, Johnny Sexton. After landing the opening penalty, Libbok missed a long-range attempt and a conversion for Cheslin Kolbe's try that he assisted with. The Boks went on to lose the match, 13-8, bagging a losing bonus point. He came under immense scrutiny being blamed for the loss singlehandedly. With the return of Handré, Manie was selected on the bench for their final pool game against Tonga where both him and Handré kicked at 100%. In the quarter-final against France, he was back in the starting team. South Africa went on to win the match by a single point. A trend they replicated in both the semi-final against England, which Libbok started in but was unceremoniously substituted early in the first half, as well as in the final against their southern hemisphere counterpart, New Zealand, where Libbok did not feature. Pollard started the final and South Africa went on to retain the Web Ellis Cup successfully. Libbok's quick rise earned him a nomination for the World Rugby Breakthrough Player Of The Year award, losing to New Zealand's Mark Tele'a.

Libbok was re-selected to represent his country for the 2024 test season by coach Rassie Erasmus. He was not included in the first 3 tests of the season. He made his first appearance for the Springboks for the year against Portugal, which they won. However, Libbok once again was rather woeful from the tee missing 3 of his 5 attempts at goal. Coach Erasmus said that he was experiencing a dip. Libbok was however included to tour Australia for the Rugby Championship, featuring from the bench in the second test for the final 7 minutes, which they won. He didn't feature in either of the two tests against New Zealand in South Africa. He made his return against Argentina in Santiago del Estero replacing Handré Pollard. Libbok gave his team the lead back with a penalty after they squandered a 17-0 lead. In the final minutes, South Africa was awarded a penalty that would've clinched the game for them, but Libbok sadly sent it wide. South Africa ended up losing the contest 28-29. Once again, he was a man under fire, coach Erasmus said that the loss can't solely be on the shoulders of Libbok and started Libbok in the final match of the competition against Los Pumas at Mbombela Stadium in Nelspruit. The match also turned out to be the decider for the championship. Libbok was acquitted from goalkicking as Jaden Hendrikse, the scrum-half conducted the placekicking. South Africa went into half time leading 27-7. They won the test 48-7 and the championship for the first time since 2019 breaking a 5 year drought. It was also South Africa's first full Rugby Championship win since the new format's inception in 2012 after the Tri Nations went defunct with the inclusion of Argentina. On the End of Year Tour in the Northern Hemisphere he was once again included by Erasmus. He started against England, a test they won.

In 2025, he made his third overall and second full season appearance for South Africa. He played from the bench in the opening contest against the Barbarian F.C on June 28. Although not an official test match, the Springboks showed their intent for the year by winning the contest in an emphatic 52-7 display. Libbok showed a new shortened goalkicking technique going 5/5 at goal. He debuted it for the Stormers in Dublin in January earlier that year, he sadly got injured that evening and thus Bok fans only got to witness it against the Barbarians. It was significant for Manie due to the immense critique regarding his placekicking. Erasmus said that he told Manie to try to miss then it'll go over and mentioned that it is the new Rhino ball that helped him sarcastically. Libbok made his first official appearance for the year in the second test against Italy which the Boks won 45-0. He was selected to start their 2025 Rugby Championship against the Wallabies at Ellis Park. After leading 22-0 by the 17th minute, the Boks went on to lose the match when Australia started their comeback late in the first half winning the game 38-22. It was also their first time to win at the venue in Johannesburg. Nick Mallett cast blame squarely on Manie highlighting his lack of game management. After sitting out two tests, he made a return against New Zealand at Sky Stadium in Wellington. With the Freedom Cup on the line and the Rugby Championship, Libbok entered the clash early in the first half for Sacha Feinberg-Mngomezulu and marshaled his team to another record victory over the All Blacks by 43 points to 10. The biggest loss for New Zealand ever inflicted by any team and at home, breaking his own prior record set at Twickenham in 2023. Libbok gained praise from former All Black players like Israel Dagg, Stephen Donald and Justin Marshall with the latter stating that Manie's performance was a catalyst to how well the Springboks performed. He continued to feature regularly for the remainder of the 2025 season from the bench barring the final fixture vs Wales, marking himself as one of the key impact players for his team.

Libbok was re-selected for the 2026 season by Erasmus. On 4 July, Libbok started at fly-half for the Boks for the third time against England in a victorious outing, winning 45-21 to open their Nations Champions Cup campaign. He featured against Wales in a winning effort two weeks afterwards from the bench in the third round. On 22 August, Libbok made a cameo from the bench vs New Zealand at Ellis Park, in a losing effort as part of the Greatest Rivalry Tour. This was South Africa's first loss since August 2025. The following week after being initially left out of the match-day squad, Libbok was entered back into the team by Rassie Erasmus from the bench, one day before the test. He went onto the field immediately after half-time for the injured Damian Willemse, where the Springboks emerged victorious 33-26. The following week, Libbok found himself having to go on early again from the bench, this time for injured fullback, Cheslin Kolbe in the first quarter of the game. He guided South Africa to a 29-24 victory over the All Blacks. This was also the Boks' first victory at the FNB Stadium in Soweto, Johannesburg over New Zealand. The following week, Libbok came from the bench in the final test of the series in Baltimore, Maryland to close the win for the Boks with 43-28 winning the series. He made a cameo appearance from the bench vs Italy in the second leg of the Nations Champions Cup, which the Boks won. In the fifth round of the NCC, Libbok came from the bench late into the game vs France where he missed a conversion on and South Africa lost 19 to 21.

== Honours ==
2015 Under-18 Craven Week Top Point Scorer

2015 Commonwealth Youth Games Sevens Gold Medalist

2021-22 United Rugby Championship Winner & Top Points Scorer

2022 DHL Stormers Player of the Year

2022-2023 United Rugby Championship Finalist, Top Points Scorer and South African Player Of The Season

2023 Qatar Airways Cup winner

2023 Rugby World Cup winner

2024 SA Sports Newcomer Of The Year

2024 Rugby Championship Winner

2025 Rugby Championship Winner

2025-26 Japan Rugby League One Division 2 Top Points Scorer

2026 Greatest Rivalry Tour Winner

== Personal life ==
Libbok met his now wife, Verna-Lee Arries, in 2014/2015 during his time at Hoërskool Outeniqua in George. Arries, a ballroom and latin dancer, noted in her interview with The Insider SA that she was the first to speak to a "shy and quiet" Manie. The two officially started dating in 2016 following high school where they maintained a long-distance relationship as Manie moved to Pretoria for the Blue Bulls academy. During this period, he also earned a Diploma in Coaching Science through UXi Sport Western Province Rugby Academy in 2017. Meanwhile, Verna started her studies in teaching at the Nelson Mandela University.

On 1 July 2023, Libbok proposed during a surprise picnic at the Klein Roosboom Boutique Winery in Cape Town. He informed her that they were going for a "couples photo shoot" to keep the proposal a surprise. They officially married at the Seeplaas wedding venue on 5 October 2024 in Groot-Brakrivier, near Mossel Bay. In his appearance on The Insider SA, Libbok emphasized that Verna is his "pillar of support" who helps him "protect his peace" amid the pressures of professional rugby.

== Reception and player profile ==
Widely recognized as an instinctive, creative playmaker for his attacking vision, Libbok is one of the most polarizing figures in Rugby union. Many pundits like Nick Mallett has publicly stated on several occasions that Libbok is good on front foot ball but falters when his forwards don't provide him with a dominant base. Gavin Rich, a prominent SuperSport writer often present a more balanced view focusing on how Libbok has revolutionized the Springboks' attacking identity. Rich argues that Libbok's passing game brings a "connectedness and potent edge" to the Springbok attack that other fly-halves struggle to replicate. He has described Manie as the "quintessential modern fly-half" that takes the ball flat to the gainline and can make split-second decisions but has noted that Libbok tends to "overplay."

Libbok and placekicking has become synonymous with each other. It has become an aspect of his game that many analysts and fans can't entangle from the mention of his name. This stems largely due to his performances for the Springboks prior and during the 2023 Rugby World Cup, particularly after a loss to Ireland where missed goals was cited as a deciding factor in their 13-8 defeat. Critics like Craig Ray from the Daily Maverick have questioned if the Springboks can continue excusing these flaws despite his "excellent" general play. Another SuperSport writer Brendan Nel has described Libbok as a "punching bag" for fan frustrations, arguing that his role in evolving the Springboks' attack outweighs the kicking concerns.

Libbok holds the record for highest winning percentage of any starting Springbok fly-half with 10 or more starts in the professional era at 86.67% (13 wins from 15 starts) trailing only amateur-era pivot, Hansie Brewis (10 wins from 10 starts,100%) all time. Across his 36 test caps overall, he has recorded 29 wins and 7 losses for an 80.56% career winning rate, the highest overall test win percentage of any regular South African fly-half in the professional era.

== Statistics ==
=== Test match record ===
As of 13 November 2026

Opponent	P	W	D	L	Try	Pts	%Won
Argentina	6	5	0	1	2	34	83.33
Australia	3	2	0	1	0	16	66.67
England	4	4	0	0	0	7	100
France	4	2	0	2	0	4	50
Ireland	2	1	0	1	0	3	50
Italy	4	4	0	0	0	22	100
Japan	1	1	0	0	0	8	100
New Zealand	7	5	0	2	0	27	71.43
Portugal	1	1	0	0	0	4	100
Scotland	1	1	0	0	0	6	100
Tonga	1	1	0	0	0	6	100
Wales	2	2	0	0	0	12	100
Total	36	29	0	7	2	149	80.56%

=== International tries ===
As of 27 September 2025

Try	Opposing team	Location	Venue	Competition	Date	Result	Score
1	Argentina	Johannesburg, South Africa	Ellis Park Stadium	2023 Rugby Championship	29 July 2023	Win	22–21
2	Argentina	Durban, South Africa	Kings Park Stadium	2025 Rugby Championship	27 September 2025	Win	67–30
