= Rassie Erasmus =

South African rugby union footballer and coach

Rassie Erasmus OIG
- Born: Johan Erasmus; 5 November 1972 (age 54) Despatch, Cape Province, South Africa
- Height: 1.91 m (6 ft 3 in)
- University: University of the Free State; North-West University

Rugby union career
- Position(s): Flanker, Number 8
Provincial / State sides
Years	Team	Apps	(Points)
1994–98, 2001–03	Free State	112	
1998–2000	Golden Lions	7	
- Correct as of 1 August 2018
Super Rugby
Years	Team	Apps	(Points)
1997	Free State	7	(10)
1998–2001	Cats	46	(45)
2003	Stormers	4	
- Correct as of 16 October 2007
International career
Years	Team	Apps	(Points)
1997–2001	South Africa	36	(35)
- Correct as of 16 October 2007
Coaching career
- Years: Team
- 2004–2006: Free State Cheetahs
- 2006–2007: Cheetahs
- 2007: South Africa (Technical Adviser)
- 2007–2010: Western Province
- 2008–2011: Stormers
- 2011: South Africa (Technical Specialist)
- 2016–2017: Munster
- 2017–2024: South Africa (Director of Rugby)
- 2018–2019: South Africa
- 2018: Barbarians
- 2024–: South Africa (Head Coach)
Medal record
Men's rugby union
Representing South Africa (as player)
Rugby World Cup
Bronze medal – third place	1999 Wales	Squad
Representing South Africa (as coach)
Gold medal – first place	2019 Japan	Squad

Johan "Rassie" Erasmus OIG (born 5 November 1972) is a South African rugby union coach and former player. He is the current head coach of the Springboks, the South Africa national team, currently in his second stint in the role. He led South Africa to win the Rugby World Cup in 2019 and 2023.

Erasmus played for the Free State, the Golden Lions, Cats and the Stormers. He won 36 caps for South Africa between 1997 and 2001, including playing at the 1999 Rugby World Cup.

As a coach, he has worked with Free State Cheetahs, Western Province and had spells as an adviser to the South Africa national team. He was also the director of rugby of Irish provincial side Munster, and previously served as general manager of high performance teams for the South African Rugby Union. He was the head coach of the South Africa national team from 2018 to the end of their 2019 World Cup campaign, doubling up on his duties as the first ever SARU Director of Rugby, to which he was appointed towards the end of 2017. He also won the 2019 World Rugby Coach of the Year award.

== Early life ==
Erasmus grew up in the small town of Despatch in the Eastern Cape Province, not far from Port Elizabeth. His father battled with addiction. Erasmus attended the University of the Free State.

== Playing career ==
Erasmus started his elite rugby career with the Free State during the 1994 Currie Cup. By the turn of professionalism in rugby union in 1995, Erasmus continued to develop as a leading loose forward for his province, and was selected for the Free State's debut season in the 1997 Super 12. By July 1997, he had been called up for national duties with the Springboks ahead of the 1997 British Lions tour to South Africa. With the series already won by the Lions ahead of the third test, Erasmus made his test debut on 5 July in Johannesburg, which the home side won 35–16. In his second match for the Springboks, on 23 August that same year, Erasmus played Australia, starting at flank, and scored a try, with South Africa winning 61–22 in Pretoria. Erasmus featured in 15 of the 17-match consecutive win streak the Springboks recorded between 1997 and late 1998. Had it not been for a 13–7 defeat by England on their 1998 tour, the Springboks would have completed a first Grand Slam tour since their 1960–61 tour. During that time, South Africa secured their first Tri Nations title in 1998, with four from four victories.

Having firmly established himself as a starting flanker for South Africa, Erasmus joined the Cats ahead of the 1998 Super 12 season, where he continued to ply his trade until 2001. He was captain between 1999 and 2000, which saw the Cats make the 2000 Super 12 season semi-finals, only to lose to the Brumbies 28–5. In 2001, he was controversially stripped of his captaincy during season by coach Laurie Mains. Despite making the semi-finals again that season, both Erasmus and Mains departed the club at the end of the season, with reports citing their relationship one of the reasons.

In 1999, Erasmus was made captain for a single test against Australia during the 1999 Tri Nations Series. He was later named in the 30-man squad for the 1999 Rugby World Cup. He played in all but one game during the World Cup, which saw the Springboks bow out in the semi-final, losing to eventual champions, Australia 27–21, after extra time. In the third-place play-off, South Africa defeated New Zealand 22–18 to take third place.

After leaving the Cats at the end of the 2001 Super 12 season, and missing out on selection for the 2001 Tri Nations Series, Erasmus returned to the Free State ahead of the 2001 Currie Cup. Later that year he was selected for the Barbarians match against Australia, but withdrew due to injury. After a stop-start season in 2003, being brought in by the Stormers for their 2003 Super 12 season, Erasmus retired at the end of the season after a professional career lasting almost ten years.

== Coaching and management career ==
=== Coaching in South Africa ===
Erasmus' coaching career began in 2004, after he became the head coach of his previous club, Free State Cheetahs, for the 2004 Vodacom Cup. In his first stint at coaching, he led his side to Semi-Finals of the Cup, only to lose to the Blue Bulls 23–20. In 2005, he made the step up to Currie Cup, leading the Free State to glory during the 2005 season. It was the Cheetahs first Cup title since 1976. The following year, Erasmus led the Cheetahs into their debut season in the Super 14 competition, finishing in tenth place with five wins from thirteen. Later that year the Free State Cheetahs retained their Currie Cup title, however they had to share the trophy with the Blue Bulls after the score remained even after extra time, 28–28, and no other criteria separating the teams. Following the 2007 Super 14 season, Erasmus left the Cheetahs set up after being appointed technical adviser to the Springboks ahead of the 2007 Rugby World Cup. However his time was cut short, after he joined the Western Province set-up as director of rugby effective immediately ahead of their 2007 Currie Cup campaign.

He was also named the new Stormers head coach for the 2008 Super 14 season, where he helped improve the side to narrowly miss out on play-off places in the semi-final – lifting the team from their tenth place in 2007 to fifth in 2008. By mid 2009, Western Province and the Stormers revamped their structure, which saw Erasmus become a Senior professional coach for the region, and Allister Coetzee introduced as head coach for the province and Super Rugby side. With this new system, the region gained great success in 2010, with both the Stormers and Western Province progressing to the finals, only to lose to come runner-up in their respective tournaments. Whilst in 2011, the Stormers became the leading South African side, topping their conference a making the semi-finals for a second consecutive year.

In April 2011, it was announced that Erasmus will be part of the Springboks management team at the 2011 Rugby World Cup as a technical specialist. South Africa was knocked out by Australia in the quarter-finals, losing 9–11. Despite that he was meant to return to his duties with the Stormers and Western Province post World Cup, he quit the region in January 2012 to look for other coaching options.

After Heyneke Meyer was named as Peter de Villiers' replacement in January 2012, Erasmus was appointed General Manager: High Performance teams, in April of that year. Part of his role consisted of acting as an assistant to Meyer when the Springboks were in training camps.

=== Munster ===
In April 2016, it was confirmed that Erasmus would be joining Irish provincial side Munster as the Director of Rugby on a three-year contract, beginning on 1 July 2016. However, following the death of head coach Anthony Foley, Erasmus took on the duties of both Director of Rugby and head coach for the remainder of the season. He led his side to top of the pool 1 in the European Rugby Champions Cup finishing in second seed overall to advance to the Quarter-finals. There they beat Toulouse, 41–16, before losing to Saracens 26–10 in the semi-finals. The 2016–17 Pro12 proved more successful, topping the table at the end of the regular season with 19 victories, and defeating the Ospreys 23–3 in the semi-finals. Despite going into the final favorites, Munster were convincingly beaten by the Scarlets in the final, losing 46–22 at the Aviva Stadium.

On 7 May 2017, Erasmus won the 2016–17 Pro12 Coach of the Season award, an honour that was given to him at Guinness Pro12 Awards dinner in the Guinness Storehouse, Dublin.

=== South Africa Director of Rugby ===
On 30 June 2017, it was confirmed that Erasmus would be leaving Munster in December 2017 to become South Africa's Director of Rugby, a position that has never been filled at SARU.

=== Head coach of South Africa ===
Following the sacking of Allister Coetzee in February 2018, Erasmus was named head coach of the national team, alongside his duties as Director of Rugby at SA Rugby, on 1 March 2018.

In his first match in charge, Erasmus gave thirteen players their first test cap, in a one-off match in Washington, D.C. against Wales, who won the test 22–20. A week later, he secured his first win, a 42–39 win over England, during their three-test series. The series title was clinched in the second test, with the Springboks winning 23–12, to secure a series victory. However, South Africa were unable to gain the clean-sweep, after losing the third test, 25–10. During the 2018 Rugby Championship, Erasmus led the Springboks to second, the highest they had been since 2014. The 2018 Championship saw South Africa win three games, including a thrilling 36–34 victory over New Zealand in Wellington, South Africa's first win in New Zealand since 2009. After winning the 2019 World Cup, Erasmus revealed that had the Springboks lost that match, he would have tendered his resignation:

"We [had recently] lost to Australia and Argentina, and if we didn't win in Wellington I would have resigned... I have never lost three games in a row as a coach and if I did that I don't deserve to be a Springbok coach. We played New Zealand in Wellington and that was important, as if we lost it I wouldn't be here."

South Africa came within moments of reclaiming the Freedom Cup in the final round, but a try by Ardie Savea in the dying moments of the game helped New Zealand snatch victory 32–30 in Pretoria and retain the cup.

The 2018 end-of-year tour for South Africa saw the team face mixed result; losing to England and Wales whilst beating France and Scotland. Following the tour, Erasmus stated that after the 2019 World Cup he would cease as head coach and revert to solely his Director of Rugby role.

The 2019 Rugby Championship saw the Springboks claim their fourth Southern Hemisphere title, their first since the inception of The Rugby Championship and their first since 2009. This came on the back of victories over Australia and Argentina, and a first draw with New Zealand since 1994.

The 2019 Rugby World Cup saw South Africa claim one of their greatest victories by winning the title for a third time despite a loss to New Zealand in the group stages. Victory over England in the final, after dispatching Japan and a grind-out victory over Wales in the knock-out stages, saw South Africa lift the Webb Ellis Cup in Tokyo.

==== Statistics ====
As of match played 20 November 2026

Opponent	Played	Won	Drawn	Lost	W%	For	Against	Diff.
New Zealand	12	7	1	4	58.33	225	189	+36
Argentina	9	7	0	2	77.78	312	187	+125
Australia	8	5	0	3	62.50	229	173	+56
England	7	5	0	2	71.43	192	141	+51
Wales	7	5	0	2	71.43	252	83	+169
Italy	5	5	0	0	100.00	234	48	+186
France	3	2	0	1	66.67	80	64	+16
Ireland	3	2	0	1	66.67	75	58	+17
Japan	3	3	0	0	100.00	128	17	+111
Scotland	3	3	0	0	100.00	100	63	+37
Canada	1	1	0	0	100.00	66	7	+59
Georgia	1	1	0	0	100.00	55	10	+45
Namibia	1	1	0	0	100.00	57	3	+54
Portugal	1	1	0	0	100.00	64	21	+43
Opponent	61	47	1	13	77.05	2,046	1,094	+952

=== Coaching approach ===
Erasmus feels that factors affecting rugby success are consistency in selection, rhythm and momentum, having few injuries, and luck (as top level games are often very close and can depend on one bounce of a ball or penalty). He plans long-term. He tends to be very open about his opinions, both in his playing group and with the media.

If his team wins a game, Erasmus wears the same shirt for the next game.

== Controversies ==
Erasmus is known to be very critical of referees after games. His complaints and accusations cost him a two-month ban by World Rugby in November 2021 after he had hit out at refereeing during the British & Irish Lions tour to South Africa in a clip. He was found guilty by a misconduct committee of "attacking, disparaging and/or denigrating the game and match officials and not accepting the authority of match officials". He also acted as a water boy during the tour in order to directly give instructions on the pitch, which was criticised by Lions coach Warren Gatland for being unsporting. In 2022 as a result of this, World Rugby banned head coaches from acting as water carriers.

He is also known for his use of social media, where he often sarcastically complains about refereeing after he started a Twitter account in the wake of 2019 Rugby World Cup. Three months before his suspension, he was suspected of using a burner account to air out his grievances against referees Nic Berry and Ben O'Keeffe. In 2022, he posted several videos alongside ironic messages on his official Twitter account, to complain about referee calls after the Springboks lost to Ireland on 5 November, and France a week later. Former international referee Nigel Owens condemned Erasmus' behaviour following the controversy, after many other columnists criticized him and called these kind of comments "bitter" or "ridiculous". On 17 November, he was suspended by World Rugby again and was banned for two matches. A few weeks after the feud, referee Wayne Barnes revealed that his family were threatened following Erasmus' tweets; his wife receiving rape threats and his kids being threatened.

In November 2026, he received a six game touchline ban, following the Springboks defeat to France in the 2026 Nations Championship, after suggesting match fixing could have taken place due to a number of alleged missed calls by the officials throughout the game.

== Honours ==
=== Player ===
South Africa

- Rugby World Cup / Webb Ellis Cup
  - Third: 1999
- Tri Nations
  - Winners: 1998
  - Runners-up: 1997

Cats

- Super 12
  - Semi-Final: 2000, 2001

Free State

- Currie Cup
  - Runners-up: 1994, 1997

=== Coach ===
Free State Cheetahs

- Currie Cup
  - Winners: 2005, 2006 (Shared with Blue Bulls)

Stormers

- Super 14
  - Runners-up: 2010

Western Province

- Currie Cup
  - Runners-up: 2010

Munster

- Pro12
  - Runners-up: 2017
- Pro12 Coach of the Season award
  - Winner: 2017

South Africa

- Rugby World Cup
  - Winners: 2019
  - Winners: 2023
- The Rugby Championship
  - Winners: 2019
  - Winners: 2024
  - Winners: 2025
- Mandela Challenge Plate
  - Winners: 2019
  - Winners: 2024
  - Winners: 2025
- Freedom Cup
  - Winners: 2024
  - Winners: 2025
  - Winners: 2026
- Qatar Airways Cup
  - Winners: 2024
  - Winners: 2025
- Prince William Cup
  - Winners: 2024
  - Winners: 2025
- World Rugby Coach of the Year
  - Winners: 2019

On 2 May 2024 Erasmus received an honorary doctorate in coaching science from the NWU. In May 2026, Rassie was bestowed the National Order of Ikhamanga by the South African Government for his contributions to sport and nation-building.

== Personal life ==
Erasmus married Nicolene, a former nurse, before 2003. They have 3 daughters. Erasmus has said "I find social occasions difficult ... I'm a quiet, uncomplicated person."

Erasmus was diagnosed with microscopic polyangiitis with granulomatosis in 2019.

== Bibliography ==
- Erasmus, Rassie; O'Sullivan, David (2023). Rassie: Stories of Life and Rugby. Johannesburg: Pan Macmillan South Africa. ISBN 978-1035029396.

Awards
Preceded by (New Zealand) Joe Schmidt	World Rugby Coach of the Year; 2019	Succeeded by (England) Simon Middleton
Sporting positions
Preceded by Corné Krige	Springbok Captain; 1999	Succeeded by Joost van der Westhuizen
Preceded by (South Africa) Allister Coetzee	South Africa National Rugby Union Coach; 2018–2019	Succeeded by (South Africa) Jacques Nienaber
Preceded by (South Africa) Jacques Nienaber	South Africa National Rugby Union Coach; 2024–Present	Succeeded by Incumbent
