= 2022 South Africa rugby union tour of Europe =

- Manager: Jacques Nienaber
- Tour captain: Siya Kolisi
Summary
P	W	D	L
Total
6	2	0	4
Test match
4	2	0	2
Opponent
P	W	D	L
Ireland
1	0	0	1
France
1	0	0	1
Italy
1	1	0	0
England
1	1	0	0

The 2022 South Africa rugby union tour of Europe was a series of matches played in November 2022 in Europe by the South Africa national rugby union team. The tour included four test matches against Ireland, France, Italy and England. The tour also featured two mid-week matches played by South Africa A against club sides Munster and Bristol Bears.

== Squads ==
=== South Africa squad ===
The South Africa squad for the tour was named on the 28 October 2022.

^{1}On 4 November, Sbu Nkosi and Marco van Staden withdrew from the squad through injury.

Player	Position	Date of birth (age)	Caps	Club/province
Bongi Mbonambi	Hooker	7 January 1991 (age 35)	52	(South Africa) Sharks
Deon Fourie	Hooker	25 September 1986 (age 39)	4	(South Africa) Stormers
Malcolm Marx	Hooker	13 July 1994 (age 31)	56	(Japan) Kubota Spears
Thomas du Toit	Prop	5 May 1995 (age 30)	14	(South Africa) Sharks
Steven Kitshoff	Prop	10 February 1992 (age 34)	68	(South Africa) Stormers
Vincent Koch	Prop	13 March 1990 (age 36)	39	(France) Stade Français
Frans Malherbe	Prop	14 March 1991 (age 35)	55	(South Africa) Stormers
Ox Nché	Prop	23 July 1995 (age 30)	16	(South Africa) Sharks
Trevor Nyakane	Prop	4 May 1989 (age 36)	59	(France) Racing 92
Lood de Jager	Lock	17 December 1992 (age 33)	65	(Japan) Saitama Wild Knights
Eben Etzebeth	Lock	29 October 1991 (age 34)	107	(South Africa) Sharks
Jason Jenkins	Lock	2 December 1995 (age 30)	1	(Ireland) Leinster
Franco Mostert	Lock	27 November 1990 (age 35)	60	(Japan) Mie Honda Heat
Salmaan Moerat	Lock	6 March 1998 (age 28)	2	(South Africa) Stormers
Marvin Orie	Lock	15 February 1993 (age 33)	8	(South Africa) Stormers
Pieter-Steph du Toit	Loose forward	20 August 1992 (age 33)	65	(Japan) Toyota Verblitz
Siya Kolisi (c)	Loose forward	16 June 1991 (age 34)	72	(South Africa) Sharks
Evan Roos	Loose forward	21 January 2000 (age 26)	1	(South Africa) Stormers
Kwagga Smith	Loose forward	11 June 1993 (age 32)	28	(Japan) Shizuoka Blue Revs
^{1}Marco van Staden	Loose forward	25 August 1995 (age 30)	9	(South Africa) Bulls
Jasper Wiese	Loose forward	21 October 1995 (age 30)	18	(England) Leicester Tigers
Faf de Klerk	Scrum-half	19 October 1991 (age 34)	43	(Japan) Yokohama Canon Eagles
Jaden Hendrikse	Scrum-half	23 March 2000 (age 26)	11	(South Africa) Sharks
Cobus Reinach	Scrum-half	7 February 1990 (age 36)	22	(France) Montpellier
Manie Libbok	Fly-half	15 July 1997 (age 28)	0	(South Africa) Stormers
Damian Willemse	Fly-half	7 May 1998 (age 27)	24	(South Africa) Stormers
Damian de Allende	Centre	25 November 1991 (age 34)	67	(Japan) Saitama Wild Knights
André Esterhuizen	Centre	30 March 1994 (age 32)	10	(England) Harlequins
Jesse Kriel	Centre	15 February 1994 (age 32)	57	(Japan) Yokohama Canon Eagles
Kurt-Lee Arendse	Wing	17 June 1996 (age 29)	4	(South Africa) Bulls
Cheslin Kolbe	Wing	28 October 1993 (age 32)	21	(France) Toulon
Makazole Mapimpi	Wing	26 July 1990 (age 35)	34	(South Africa) Sharks
Sbu Nkosi	Wing	21 January 1996 (age 30)	16	(South Africa) Bulls
Willie le Roux	Fullback	18 August 1989 (age 36)	80	(Japan) Toyota Verblitz
Sacha Mngomezulu	Fullback	22 February 2002 (age 24)	0	(South Africa) Stormers

=== South Africa A squad ===
The South Africa A squad was also named on the 28 October 2022.

^{1}On 4 November 2022, Jan-Hendrik Wessels withdrew from the squad due to injury. Elrigh Louw, Leolin Zas and JJ Kotze were called up to the South Africa A squad.

^{2}On 7 November 2022, Dan du Preez and Jean-Luc du Preez were named as part of the South Africa A squad to play Munster despite not being named in the original South Africa A squad.

Player	Position	Date of birth (age)	Caps	Club/province
Joseph Dweba	Hooker	25 October 1995 (age 30)	4	(South Africa) Stormers
^{1}JJ Kotze	Hooker	6 November 2000 (age 25)	0	(South Africa) Stormers
Andre-Hugo Venter	Hooker	10 September 2001 (age 24)	0	(South Africa) Stormers
^{1}Jan-Hendrik Wessels	Hooker	8 May 2001 (age 24)	0	(South Africa) Bulls
Simphiwe Matanzima	Prop	18 August 1997 (age 28)	0	(South Africa) Bulls
Ntuthuko Mchunu	Prop	5 April 1999 (age 27)	1	(South Africa) Sharks
Sazi Sandi	Prop	11 August 1998 (age 27)	0	(South Africa) Stormers
Mornay Smith	Prop	30 January 1998 (age 28)	0	(South Africa) Bulls
Ruan Nortjé	Lock	25 July 1998 (age 27)	1	(South Africa) Bulls
Phepsi Buthelezi	Loose forward	30 May 1999 (age 26)	0	(South Africa) Sharks
^{2}Dan du Preez	Loose forward	5 August 1995 (age 30)	6	(England) Sale Sharks
^{2}Jean-Luc du Preez	Loose forward	5 August 1995 (age 30)	13	(England) Sale Sharks
^{1}Elrigh Louw	Loose forward	20 September 1999 (age 26)	2	(South Africa) Bulls
Sikhumbuzo Notshe	Loose forward	28 May 1993 (age 32)	6	(South Africa) Sharks
Herschel Jantjies	Scrum-half	22 April 1996 (age 30)	22	(South Africa) Stormers
Sanele Nohamba	Scrum-half	19 January 1999 (age 27)	0	(South Africa) Lions
Grant Williams	Scrum-half	22 July 1996 (age 29)	1	(South Africa) Sharks
Johan Goosen	Fly-half	27 July 1992 (age 33)	13	(South Africa) Bulls
Gianni Lombard	Fly-half	22 January 1998 (age 28)	0	(South Africa) Lions
Cornal Hendricks	Centre	18 April 1988 (age 38)	12	(South Africa) Bulls
Henco van Wyk	Centre	7 May 2001 (age 24)	0	(South Africa) Lions
Suleiman Hartzenberg	Centre	20 May 2003 (age 22)	0	(South Africa) Stormers
^{1}Leolin Zas	Wing	20 October 1995 (age 30)	0	(South Africa) Stormers
Aphelele Fassi	Fullback	23 January 1998 (age 28)	3	(South Africa) Sharks

== Test Matches ==
5 November 2022
17:30 WET (UTC+0)

Ireland	19–16	South Africa
Try: Van der Flier 46' m Hansen 50' m Pen: Sexton (3/3) 3', 35', 74'	Report	Try: Mostert 67' m Arendse 77' m Pen: Willemse (1/2) 9'; Kolbe (1/1) 40+2'

Aviva Stadium, Dublin
Attendance: 51,000
Referee: Nika Amashukeli (Georgia)

FB	15	Hugo Keenan
RW	14	Robert Baloucoune
OC	13	Garry Ringrose
IC	12	Stuart McCloskey	(substituted off) 27'
LW	11	Mack Hansen
FH	10	Johnny Sexton (c)	(substituted off) 78'
SH	9	Conor Murray	(substituted off) 35'
N8	8	Caelan Doris
OF	7	Josh van der Flier
BF	6	Peter O'Mahony	(substituted off) 69'
RL	5	James Ryan
LL	4	Tadhg Beirne	(substituted off) 64'
TP	3	Tadhg Furlong	(substituted off) 40'
HK	2	Dan Sheehan	(substituted off) 64'
LP	1	Andrew Porter	(substituted off) 69'
Replacements:
HK	16	Rob Herring	(substituted on) 64'
PR	17	Cian Healy	(substituted on) 69'
PR	18	Finlay Bealham	(substituted on) 40'
LK	19	Kieran Treadwell	(substituted on) 64'
N8	20	Jack Conan	(substituted on) 69'
SH	21	Jamison Gibson-Park	(substituted on) 35'
FH	22	Joey Carbery	(substituted on) 78'
WG	23	Jimmy O'Brien	(substituted on) 27'
Coach:
(England) Andy Farrell

FB	15	Cheslin Kolbe	(yellow card) 17' to 27'
RW	14	Kurt-Lee Arendse		(substituted off) 53'	(substituted on) 65'
OC	13	Jesse Kriel
IC	12	Damian de Allende
LW	11	Makazole Mapimpi			(substituted off) 65'
FH	10	Damian Willemse
SH	9	Jaden Hendrikse		(substituted off) 52'
N8	8	Jasper Wiese		(substituted off) 52'
BF	7	Pieter-Steph du Toit		(substituted off) 64'
OF	6	Siya Kolisi (c)
RL	5	Lood de Jager		(substituted off) 35'
LL	4	Eben Etzebeth
TP	3	Frans Malherbe		(substituted off) 45'
HK	2	Malcolm Marx		(substituted off) 57'
LP	1	Steven Kitshoff		(substituted off) 57'
Replacements:
HK	16	Bongi Mbonambi		(substituted on) 57'
PR	17	Ox Nché		(substituted on) 57'
PR	18	Vincent Koch		(substituted on) 45'
LK	19	Franco Mostert		(substituted on) 34'
FL	20	Kwagga Smith		(substituted on) 52'
FL	21	Deon Fourie		(substituted on) 64'
SH	22	Faf de Klerk		(substituted on) 52'
FB	23	Willie le Roux		(substituted on) 53'
Coach:
(South Africa) Jacques Nienaber

Assistant referees:
Mathieu Raynal (France)
Andrea Piardi (Italy)
Television match official:
Stuart Terheege (England)

Notes:

- Robbie Henshaw (Ireland) had originally been named to start, but withdrew the day before the match due to injury. He was replaced by Stuart McCloskey, whose place on the bench was taken by Jimmy O'Brien.
- Jimmy O'Brien (Ireland) made his international debut.
- Conor Murray (Ireland) became the eighth Irishman to earn his 100th test cap for Ireland.

12 November 2022
21:00 CET (UTC+1)

France	30–26	South Africa
Try: Baille 21' c Falatea 75' m Con: Ramos (1/2) 22'; Pen: Ramos (6/6) 3', 17', 40+1', 46', 59', 79'	Report	Try: Kolisi 30' c Arendse 51' c Con: Kolbe (1/1) 31'; De Klerk (1/1) 52'; Pen: Kolbe (2/2) 26', 43'; De Klerk (1/1) 55'; Willemse (1/1) 64'

Stade Vélodrome, Marseille
Attendance: 62,500
Referee: Wayne Barnes (England)

FB	15	Thomas Ramos
RW	14	Damian Penaud
OC	13	Gaël Fickou
IC	12	Jonathan Danty		(substituted off) 12'
LW	11	Yoram Moefana
FH	10	Romain Ntamack		(substituted off) 71'
SH	9	Antoine Dupont (c)	(red card) 48'
N8	8	Grégory Alldritt		(substituted off) 53'
OF	7	Charles Ollivon
BF	6	Anthony Jelonch
RL	5	Thibaud Flament		(substituted off) 31'
LL	4	Cameron Woki		(substituted off) 77'
TP	3	Uini Atonio		(substituted off) 60'
HK	2	Julien Marchand		(substituted off) 60'
LP	1	Cyril Baille		(substituted off) 40'
Replacements:
HK	16	Peato Mauvaka		(substituted on) 60'
PR	17	Reda Wardi		(substituted on) 40'
PR	18	Sipili Falatea		(substituted on) 60'
LK	19	Romain Taofifénua		(substituted on) 31'
LK	20	Bastien Chalureau		(substituted on) 77'
FL	21	Sekou Macalou		(substituted on) 12'
SH	22	Maxime Lucu		(substituted on) 53'
FH	23	Matthieu Jalibert		(substituted on) 71'
Coach:
(France) Fabien Galthié

FB	15	Willie le Roux
RW	14	Cheslin Kolbe		(substituted off) 48'
OC	13	Jesse Kriel		(substituted off) 76'
IC	12	Damian de Allende
LW	11	Kurt-Lee Arendse
FH	10	Damian Willemse
SH	9	Faf de Klerk		(substituted off) 60'
N8	8	Kwagga Smith		(substituted off) 60'
BF	7	Pieter-Steph du Toit	(red card) 12'
OF	6	Siya Kolisi (c)		(substituted off) 72'
RL	5	Franco Mostert
LL	4	Eben Etzebeth
TP	3	Frans Malherbe		(substituted off) 51'
HK	2	Bongi Mbonambi		(substituted off) 29'	(substituted on) 40'	(substituted off) 51'
LP	1	Ox Nché		(substituted off) 51'
Replacements:
HK	16	Malcolm Marx		(substituted on) 29'	(substituted off) 40'	(substituted on) 51'
PR	17	Steven Kitshoff		(substituted on) 51'
PR	18	Vincent Koch		(substituted on) 51'
LK	19	Marvin Orie		(substituted on) 72'
FL	20	Deon Fourie	(yellow card) 70' to 80'	(substituted on) 60'
SH	21	Cobus Reinach		(substituted on) 60'
FH	22	Manie Libbok		(substituted on) 76'
WG	23	Makazole Mapimpi		(substituted on) 48'
Coach:
(South Africa) Jacques Nienaber

Assistant referees:

Karl Dickson (England)

Christophe Ridley (England)

Television match official:

Brian MacNeice (Ireland)

Notes:

- Jasper Wiese (South Africa) had originally been named to start, but withdrew prior to the match due to injury. He was replaced by Kwagga Smith, whose place on the bench was taken by Deon Fourie.
- Bastien Chalureau, Reda Wardi (both France) and Manie Libbok (South Africa) made their international debuts.

19 November 2022
14:00 CET (UTC+1)

Italy	21–63	South Africa
Try: Capuozzo 11' c L. Cannone 66' m Con: Allan (1/2) 13'; Pen: Allan (3/3) 8', 21', 45'	Report	Try: Arendse (2) 2' m, 47' c Mbonambi 30' c Kolbe 45' m Smith 55' c Marx 62' c Kitshoff 68' c Willemse 73' c Reinach 79' c Con: Kolbe (1/2) 31'; Libbok (5/6) 50', 56', 70', 74', 80+1'; Pen: Kolbe (2/2) 10', 26'

Stadio Luigi Ferraris, Genoa
Attendance: 26,457
Referee: Matthew Carley (England)

FB	15	Ange Capuozzo
RW	14	Pierre Bruno	(substituted off) 71'
OC	13	Ignacio Brex
IC	12	Luca Morisi	(substituted off) 51'
LW	11	Monty Ioane
FH	10	Tommaso Allan
SH	9	Stephen Varney	(substituted off) 61'
N8	8	Lorenzo Cannone
OF	7	Michele Lamaro (c)
BF	6	Sebastian Negri	(substituted off) 51'
RL	5	Federico Ruzza	(substituted off) 68'
LL	4	Niccolò Cannone
TP	3	Pietro Ceccarelli	(substituted off) 40'
HK	2	Giacomo Nicotera	(substituted off) 40'
LP	1	Danilo Fischetti	(substituted off) 51'
Replacements:
HK	16	Gianmarco Lucchesi	(substituted on) 40'
PR	17	Ivan Nemer	(substituted on) 51'
PR	18	Simone Ferrari	(substituted on) 40'
LK	19	David Sisi	(substituted on) 68'
FL	20	Manuel Zuliani	(substituted on) 51'
SH	21	Alessandro Garbisi	(substituted on) 61'
FB	22	Edoardo Padovani	(substituted on) 71'
CE	23	Tommaso Menoncello	(substituted on) 51'
Coach:
(New Zealand) Kieran Crowley

FB	15	Willie le Roux
RW	14	Cheslin Kolbe	(substituted off) 47'
OC	13	Damian de Allende
IC	12	André Esterhuizen
LW	11	Kurt-Lee Arendse
FH	10	Damian Willemse
SH	9	Faf de Klerk	(substituted off) 69'
N8	8	Jasper Wiese	(substituted off) 61'
BF	7	Franco Mostert
OF	6	Siya Kolisi (c)
RL	5	Marvin Orie	(substituted off) 51'
LL	4	Salmaan Moerat	(substituted off) 43'
TP	3	Frans Malherbe	(substituted off) 50'
HK	2	Bongi Mbonambi	(substituted off) 50'
LP	1	Ox Nché	(substituted off) 50'
Replacements:
HK	16	Malcolm Marx	(substituted on) 50'
PR	17	Steven Kitshoff	(substituted on) 50'
PR	18	Vincent Koch	(substituted on) 50'
LK	19	Eben Etzebeth	(substituted on) 43'
FL	20	Kwagga Smith	(substituted on) 51'
FL	21	Evan Roos	(substituted on) 61'
SH	22	Cobus Reinach	(substituted on) 69'
FH	23	Manie Libbok	(substituted on) 47'
Coach:
(South Africa) Jacques Nienaber

Player of the Match:
Kurt-Lee Arendse (South Africa)

Assistant referees:
Wayne Barnes (England)
Sam Grove-White (Scotland)
Television match official:
Eric Gauzins (France)

Notes:

- South Africa recorded their biggest ever away victory over Italy (excluding their meeting in the 2019 Rugby World Cup, which took place in a neutral venue).

26 November 2022
17:30 GMT (UTC+0)

England	13–27	South Africa
Try: Slade 72' c Con: Farrell (1/1) 73'; Pen: Farrell (2/3) 14', 46'	Report	Try: Arendse 33' m Etzebeth 50' c Con: de Klerk (1/2) 50'; Pen: de Klerk (3/4) 19', 40', 58'; Drop: Willemse (2/2) 32', 42'

Twickenham Stadium, London
Attendance: 81,268
Referee: Angus Gardner (Australia)

FB	15	Freddie Steward
RW	14	Tommy Freeman		(substituted off) 40'
OC	13	Manu Tuilagi
IC	12	Owen Farrell (c)
LW	11	Jonny May
FH	10	Marcus Smith		(substituted off) 61'
SH	9	Jack van Poortvliet		(substituted off) 67'
N8	8	Billy Vunipola		(substituted off) 57'
OF	7	Tom Curry	(yellow card) 49' to 59'
BF	6	Alex Coles		(substituted off) 47'
RL	5	Jonny Hill
LL	4	Maro Itoje
TP	3	Kyle Sinckler		(substituted off) 40'	(substituted on) 76'
HK	2	Jamie George		(substituted off) 40'
LP	1	Mako Vunipola		(substituted off) 40'
Replacements:
HK	16	Luke Cowan-Dickie		(substituted on) 40'
PR	17	Ellis Genge		(substituted on) 40'
PR	18	Will Stuart		(substituted on) 40'	(substituted off) 76'
LK	19	David Ribbans		(substituted on) 47'
N8	20	Sam Simmonds		(substituted on) 57'
SH	21	Ben Youngs		(substituted on) 67'
CE	22	Henry Slade		(substituted on) 61'
WG	23	Jack Nowell		(substituted on) 40'
Coach:
(Australia) Eddie Jones

FB	15	Willie le Roux		(substituted off) 61'
RW	14	Kurt-Lee Arendse		(substituted off) 79'
OC	13	Jesse Kriel
IC	12	Damian de Allende
LW	11	Makazole Mapimpi			(substituted off) 63'
FH	10	Damian Willemse
SH	9	Faf de Klerk		(substituted off) 73'
N8	8	Evan Roos		(substituted off) 52'	(substituted on) 73'
BF	7	Franco Mostert
OF	6	Siya Kolisi (c)			(substituted off) 73'
RL	5	Marvin Orie		(substituted off) 46'
LL	4	Eben Etzebeth
TP	3	Frans Malherbe		(substituted off) 60'	(substituted on) 63'
HK	2	Bongi Mbonambi		(substituted off) 47'
LP	1	Ox Nché		(substituted off) 47'
Replacements:
HK	16	Malcolm Marx		(substituted on) 47'
PR	17	Steven Kitshoff		(substituted on) 47'
PR	18	Thomas du Toit	(red card) 61'	(substituted on) 60'
FL	19	Marco van Staden		(substituted on) 54'
FL	20	Kwagga Smith		(substituted on) 46'
SH	21	Jaden Hendrikse		(substituted on) 73'
FH	22	Manie Libbok		(substituted on) 61'
WG	23	Canan Moodie		(substituted on) 79'
Coach:
(South Africa) Jacques Nienaber

Player of the Match:
Franco Mostert (South Africa)

Assistant referees:
Andrew Brace (Ireland)
Pierre Brousset (France)
Television match official:
Ben Whitehouse (Wales)

Notes:

- Manu Tuilagi (England) earned his 50th test cap.

== Mid-week matches ==
10 November 2022
19:30 GMT (UTC+0)

Munster	28–14	South Africa A
Try: Daly 2' c Zebo 29' c Barron 38' c Haley 42' c Con: Healy (4/4) 4', 30', 39', 43'	Report	Try: Fassi 14' c Notshe 62' c Con: Goosen (1/1) 15'; Lombard (1/1) 63'

Páirc Uí Chaoimh, Cork
Attendance: 41,400
Referee: Karl Dickson (England)

FB	15	Mike Haley
RW	14	Shane Daly
OC	13	Antoine Frisch		(substituted off) 63'
IC	12	Rory Scannell
LW	11	Simon Zebo		(substituted off) 53'
FH	10	Ben Healy
SH	9	Paddy Patterson		(substituted off) 72'
N8	8	Gavin Coombes		(substituted off) 57'
OF	7	John Hodnett		(substituted off) 61'	(substituted on) 72'
BF	6	Jack O'Donoghue (c)
RL	5	Kiran McDonald
LL	4	Edwin Edogbo		(substituted off) 63'
TP	3	Roman Salanoa		(substituted off) 55'
HK	2	Diarmuid Barron		(substituted off) 55'
LP	1	Josh Wycherley		(substituted off) 55'	(substituted on) 61'	(substituted off) 72'
Replacements:
HK	16	Niall Scannell		(substituted on) 55'
PR	17	Liam O'Connor	(yellow card) 61' to 71'	(substituted on) 55'
PR	18	Keynan Knox		(substituted on) 55'
LK	19	Cian Hurley		(substituted on) 63'
N8	20	Alex Kendellen		(substituted on) 57'
SH	21	Neil Cronin		(substituted on) 72'
FH	22	Patrick Campbell		(substituted on) 53'
WG	23	Malakai Fekitoa		(substituted on) 63'
Coach:
(England) Graham Rowntree

FB	15	Aphelele Fassi
RW	14	Suleiman Hartzenberg
OC	13	Henco van Wyk
IC	12	Cornal Hendricks
LW	11	Leolin Zas
FH	10	Johan Goosen
SH	9	Herschel Jantjies
N8	8	Jean-Luc du Preez
BF	7	Elrigh Louw
OF	6	Phepsi Buthelezi
RL	5	Ruan Nortjé
LL	4	Jason Jenkins
TP	3	Thomas du Toit (c)
HK	2	Joseph Dweba
LP	1	Ntuthuko Mchunu
Replacements:
HK	16	Andre-Hugo Venter
PR	17	Simphiwe Matanzima
PR	18	Sazi Sandi
LK	19	Dan du Preez
FL	20	Sikhumbuzo Notshe
SH	21	Grant Williams
FH	22	Sanele Nohamba
CE	23	Gianni Lombard
Coach:
(South Africa) Mzwandile Stick

Player of the match:
Paddy Patterson (Munster)

17 November 2022
19:30 GMT (UTC+0)

Bristol Bears (England)	26–18	South Africa A
Try: Ibitoye 32' c Thomas 59' c Con: Sheedy (2/2) 33', 59'; Pen: Sheedy (4/4) 16', 25', 51', 67'	Report	Try: Mchunu 48' m Notshe 77' c Con: Feinberg-Mngomezulu (0/1); Goosen (1/1) 77'; Pen: Feinberg-Mngomezulu (2/2) 3', 19'

Ashton Gate, Bristol
Attendance: 26,387

FB	15	Luke Morahan
RW	14	Deago Bailey
OC	13	Piers O'Conor
IC	12	Sam Bedlow	(substituted off) 68'
LW	11	Gabriel Ibitoye
FH	10	Callum Sheedy
SH	9	Will Porter	(substituted off) 65'
N8	8	Fitz Harding
OF	7	Jake Heenan	(substituted off) 60'
BF	6	Magnus Bradbury
RL	5	Joe Batley
LL	4	Joe Joyce (c)	(substituted off) 12'
TP	3	Max Lahiff	(substituted off) 65'
HK	2	Bryan Byrne	(substituted off) 54'
LP	1	Yann Thomas	(substituted off) 60'
Replacements:
HK	16	Harry Thacker	(substituted on) 54'
PR	17	Jake Woolmore	(substituted on) 60'
PR	18	Jonathan Benz-Salomon	(substituted on) 65'
LK	19	John Hawkin	(substituted on) 12'
N8	20	Sam Lewis	(substituted on) 60'
SH	21	Andy Uren	(substituted on) 65'
FH	22	Joe Jenkins	(substituted on) 68'
WG	23	Rich Lane
Coach:
(Samoa) Pat Lam

FB	15	Gianni Lombard
RW	14	Suleiman Hartzenberg
OC	13	Henco van Wyk
IC	12	Cornal Hendricks
LW	11	Leolin Zas
FH	10	Sacha Feinberg-Mngomezulu
SH	9	Grant Williams
N8	8	Jean-Luc du Preez
BF	7	Elrigh Louw
OF	6	Marco van Staden
RL	5	Ruan Nortjé
LL	4	Jason Jenkins	(yellow card) 15' to 25'
TP	3	Thomas du Toit (c)
HK	2	Andre-Hugo Venter
LP	1	Ntuthuko Mchunu
Replacements:
HK	16	JJ Kotze
PR	17	Simphiwe Matanzima
PR	18	Mornay Smith
LK	19	Dan du Preez
FL	20	Sikhumbuzo Notshe
SH	21	Phepsi Buthelezi
FH	22	Sanele Nohamba
CE	23	Johan Goosen
Coach:
(South Africa) Mzwandile Stick

Player of the match:
Joe Batley (Bristol Bears)
