= 1997 Northern Transvaal Currie Cup season =

Rugby union competition season

1997 Currie Cup
- Countries: South Africa
- Champions: Western Province
- Runners-up: Free State Cheetahs

Northern Transvaal were one of fourteen teams that competed in the 1997 Currie Cup competition. They won eight out of their thirteen matches and ended the season in fifth position on the log, failing to qualify for the semi-finals.

At the conclusion of the season, the Northern Transvaal Rugby Union announced that they would change their name to the Blue Bulls for future seasons.

== Log ==
The final log of the round-robin stage of the 1997 Currie Cup: (Note: The log on the South African Rugby Union's page seems to use the old points scoring system of two points for a win and one for a draw, instead of the system that has four points for a win, two points for a draw and bonus points for losing by less than seven points or scoring more than four tries in a match. The log also incorrectly includes the results of matches in the semi-final and final.)

1997 Currie Cup log
Pos	Team	Pld	W	D	L	PF	PA	PD	TF	TA	Pts	Qualification
1	Western Province	13	12	0	1	567	286	+281	79	30	58	semi-finals
2	Sharks	13	12	0	1	566	241	+325	76	24	57	semi-finals
3	Free State Cheetahs	13	11	0	2	651	234	+417	85	26	54	semi-finals
4	Gauteng Lions	13	9	0	4	562	399	+163	74	48	45	semi-finals
5	Northern Transvaal	13	8	0	5	382	341	+41	39	33	40	
6	Griqualand West	13	7	1	5	410	313	+97	54	33	39	
7	Boland Cavaliers	13	6	1	6	464	386	+78	66	43	38	
8	SWD Eagles	13	7	0	6	362	365	−3	42	42	36	
9	Mpumalanga Pumas	13	4	0	9	321	438	−117	36	53	22	
10	Gauteng Falcons	13	3	0	10	349	600	−251	40	83	18	
11	Border	13	3	0	10	277	569	−292	35	77	17	
12	Northern Free State	13	3	0	10	344	744	−400	37	104	17	
13	North West	13	3	0	10	346	507	−161	43	74	16	
14	Eastern Province	13	2	0	11	284	462	−178	31	67	12	

Rules for classification: 4 points for a win; 2 points for a draw; 1 bonus point for a loss by seven points or less; 1 bonus point for scoring four or more tries in a match

== Results ==
11 June 1997	Northern Transvaal	18–30	SWD Eagles	Loftus Versfeld, Pretoria
		Scoreboard

10 July 1997	Gauteng Falcons	26–23	Northern Transvaal	Bosman Stadium, Brakpan
		Scoreboard

24 July 1997	Northern Transvaal	34–36	Northern Free State	Pietersburg
		Scoreboard

1 August 1997	Border	20–39	Northern Transvaal	Waverley Park, East London
		Scoreboard

6 August 1997	Northern Transvaal	26–23	Boland	Loftus Versfeld, Pretoria
		Scoreboard

14 August 1997	Free State Cheetahs	57–27	Northern Transvaal	Free State Stadium, Bloemfontein
		Scoreboard

28 August 1997	Northern Transvaal	19–15	Gauteng Lions	Loftus Versfeld, Pretoria
		Scoreboard

4 September 1997	Mpumalanga Pumas	16–36	Northern Transvaal	Johann van Riebeeck Stadium, Witbank
		Scoreboard

10 September 1997	Northern Transvaal	40–9	Eastern Province	Loftus Versfeld, Pretoria
		Scoreboard

17 September 1997	North West	17–38	Northern Transvaal	Olën Park, Potchefstroom
		Scoreboard

25 September 1997	Northern Transvaal	15–12	Griqualand West	Loftus Versfeld, Pretoria
		Scoreboard

2 October 1997	Western Province	52–34	Northern Transvaal	Newlands Stadium, Cape Town
		Scoreboard

9 October 1997	Northern Transvaal	33–28	Sharks	Loftus Versfeld, Pretoria
		Scoreboard
