= 1994 Northern Transvaal Currie Cup season =

Rugby union competition season

1994 Currie Cup
- Countries: South Africa
- Champions: Transvaal
- Runners-up: Free State

The Northern Transvaal rugby union team competed in the 1994 Currie Cup tournament in South Africa. The team came in 5th out of 6 teams.

== Northern Transvaal results in the 1994 Currie cup ==
1994 Northern Transvaal results
game №	Northern Transvaal points	Opponent points	Opponent	date	Venue	Result	Match notes
1	7	32	Western Province	18 June 1994	Newlands, Cape Town	Northern Transvaal lost	
2	22	17	Eastern Province	2 July 1994	Loftus Versfeld, Pretoria	Northern Transvaal won	
3	13	57	Transvaal	9 July 1994	Ellis Park Stadium, Johannesburg	Northern Transvaal lost	
4	23	12	Natal	16 July 1994	Loftus Versfeld, Pretoria	Northern Transvaal won	
5	27	34	Free State	23 July 1994	Newlands Stadium, Cape Town	Northern Transvaal lost	
6	25	34	Western Province	20 August 1994	Loftus Versfeld, Pretoria	Northern Transvaal lost	
7	26	23	Eastern Province	27 August 1994	Port Elizabeth	Northern Transvaal won	
8	44	35	Transvaal	10 September 1994	Loftus Versfeld, Pretoria	Northern Transvaal won	
9	28	44	Natal	17 September 1994	King's Park, Durban	Northern Transvaal lost	
10	30	33	Free State	24 September 1994	Loftus Versfeld, Pretoria	Northern Transvaal lost	

- Northern Transvaal did not qualify for the 1994 Currie Cup final.

== Statistics ==
=== 1994 Currie cup log position ===
1994 Currie Cup Log
	Team	Played	Won	Drawn	Lost	Points for	Points against	Points difference	Tries for	Tries against	Points
5th	Northern Transvaal	10	4	0	6	245	321	-76	23	32	8

=== 1988 - 1994 results summary (including play off matches) ===
Period	Games	Won	Drawn	Lost	Win %	Points for	Average PF	Points against	40-49 pts	50-99 pts	100+ pts	Best score	Worst score against
1988–1994	86	60	2	24	69.77%	2342	27.23	1702	6	5	0	71-3 vs South West Africa (1989)	57-13 vs Transvaal (1994)
