= 1997 Currie Cup =

1997 rugby union competition

- Countries: South Africa
- Date: 28 May – 25 October 1997
- Champions: Western Province (29th title)
- Runners-up: Free State Cheetahs
- Matches played: 94

The 1997 Currie Cup was the 59th season of the Currie Cup, South Africa's premier domestic rugby union competition, since it started in 1889. The competition was known as the Bankfin Currie Cup for sponsorship reasons and was contested from 28 May to 25 October 1997. (Note: There are some discrepancies. The match dates are given to be Wednesdays, Thursdays and Fridays, which is unlikely, since matches are generally played on Saturdays. It is also unlikely that the Sharks would have played all their matches at the University of Natal, rather than their traditional home, the Kings Park Stadium.)

The competition was won by Western Province for the 29th time in their history; they beat the Free State Cheetahs 14–12 in the final played on 25 October 1997.

== Competition rules and information ==
There were fourteen participating teams in the 1997 Currie Cup. These teams played all the other teams once over the course of the season, either at home or away.

Teams received four points for a win and two points for a draw. Bonus points were awarded to teams that scored four or more tries in a game, as well as to teams that lost a match by seven points or less. Teams were ranked by log points, then points difference (points scored less points conceded). The top 4 teams qualified for the title play-offs. In the semi-finals, the team that finished first had home advantage against the team that finished fourth, while the team that finished second had home advantage against the team that finished third. The winners of these semi-finals advanced to the final, at the home venue of the higher-placed team.

== Teams ==
Location of teams in the 1997 Currie Cup

=== Team listing ===
1997 Currie Cup teams
Team	Sponsored Name	Stadium/s	Sponsored Name
Boland	Bokomo Boland	Boland Stadium, Wellington	Boland Stadium
Border	Border	Waverley Park, East London	Waverley Park
Eastern Province	Eastern Province	PE Stadium, Port Elizabeth	PE Stadium
Free State Cheetahs	Free State Cheetahs	Free State Stadium, Bloemfontein	Vodacom Park
Gauteng Falcons	Gauteng Falcons	Bosman Stadium, Brakpan	Bosman Stadium
Gauteng Falcons	Gauteng Falcons	Isak Steyl Stadium, Vanderbijlpark	Isak Steyl Stadium
Gauteng Lions	Gauteng Lions	Ellis Park Stadium, Johannesburg	Ellis Park Stadium
Griqualand West	Griqualand West	Griqua Park, Kimberley	ABSA Park
Mpumalanga Pumas	Mpumalanga Pumas	Johann van Riebeeck Stadium, Witbank	Johann van Riebeeck Stadium
North West	North West	Olën Park, Potchefstroom	Olën Park
Northern Free State	Northern Free State	North West Stadium, Welkom	North West Stadium
Northern Transvaal	Northern Transvaal	Loftus Versfeld, Pretoria	Minolta Loftus
Northern Transvaal	Northern Transvaal	Pietersburg	Pietersburg
Sharks	Sharks	University of Natal, Durban	University of Natal
SWD Eagles	SWD Eagles	Outeniqua Park, George	Outeniqua Park
Western Province	Norwich Western Province	Newlands Stadium, Cape Town	Fedsure Park Newlands

=== Changes from 1996 ===
The two sections used in 1996, Section A and Section B, were merged into a single division for 1997, with all teams playing each other once. The team also adopted the new rugby union bonus points system, which was previously used in the 1996 Super 12 season.

Also, there were several name changes:

- Eastern Transvaal were renamed the Gauteng Falcons.
- Free State were renamed the Free State Cheetahs.
- Natal were renamed the Sharks.
- South Eastern Transvaal were renamed the Mpumalanga Pumas.
- South Western Districts were renamed the SWD Eagles.
- Transvaal were renamed the Gauteng Lions.
- Western Transvaal were renamed North West.

== Log ==
The final log of the round-robin stage of the 1997 Currie Cup: (Note: The log on the South African Rugby Union's page seems to use the old points scoring system of two points for a win and one for a draw, instead of the system that has four points for a win, two points for a draw and bonus points for losing by less than seven points or scoring more than four tries in a match. The log also incorrectly includes the results of matches in the semi-final and final.)

1997 Currie Cup log
Pos	Team	Pld	W	D	L	PF	PA	PD	TF	TA	Pts	Qualification
1	Western Province	13	12	0	1	567	286	+281	79	30	58	semi-finals
2	Sharks	13	12	0	1	566	241	+325	76	24	57	semi-finals
3	Free State Cheetahs	13	11	0	2	651	234	+417	85	26	54	semi-finals
4	Gauteng Lions	13	9	0	4	562	399	+163	74	48	45	semi-finals
5	Northern Transvaal	13	8	0	5	382	341	+41	39	33	40	
6	Griqualand West	13	7	1	5	410	313	+97	54	33	39	
7	Boland Cavaliers	13	6	1	6	464	386	+78	66	43	38	
8	SWD Eagles	13	7	0	6	362	365	−3	42	42	36	
9	Mpumalanga Pumas	13	4	0	9	321	438	−117	36	53	22	
10	Gauteng Falcons	13	3	0	10	349	600	−251	40	83	18	
11	Border	13	3	0	10	277	569	−292	35	77	17	
12	Northern Free State	13	3	0	10	344	744	−400	37	104	17	
13	North West	13	3	0	10	346	507	−161	43	74	16	
14	Eastern Province	13	2	0	11	284	462	−178	31	67	12	

Rules for classification: 4 points for a win; 2 points for a draw; 1 bonus point for a loss by seven points or less; 1 bonus point for scoring four or more tries in a match

== Matches ==
The following matches were played in the 1997 Currie Cup:

=== Round one ===
28 May 1997	Griqualand West	43–17	SWD Eagles	Griqua Park, Kimberley
		Scoreboard

Bye/s: Boland, Border, Eastern Province, Free State Cheetahs, Gauteng Falcons, Gauteng Lions, Mpumalanga Pumas, North West, Northern Free State, Northern Transvaal, Sharks, Western Province

=== Round two ===
4 June 1997	Gauteng Falcons	39–31	North West	Bosman Stadium, Brakpan
		Scoreboard

4 June 1997	Northern Free State	31–18	Eastern Province	North West Stadium, Welkom
		Scoreboard

5 June 1997	Boland	33–35	Gauteng Lions	Boland Stadium, Wellington
		Scoreboard

6 June 1997	Sharks	34–22	Western Province	University of Natal, Durban
		Scoreboard

Bye/s: Border, Free State Cheetahs, Griqualand West, Mpumalanga Pumas, Northern Transvaal, SWD Eagles

=== Round three ===
11 June 1997	Griqualand West	63–18	Northern Free State	Griqua Park, Kimberley
		Scoreboard

11 June 1997	Northern Transvaal	18–30	SWD Eagles	Loftus Versfeld, Pretoria
	Pen: Casper Steyn (6)	Scoreboard	Try: Conrad Stoltz, Anton Leonard, Botha Rossouw; Con: Braam van Straaten (3); Pen: Braam van Straaten (3)

12 June 1997	Mpumalanga Pumas	19–56	Free State Cheetahs	Johann van Riebeeck Stadium, Witbank
		Scoreboard

12 June 1997	North West	66–15	Border	Olën Park, Potchefstroom
		Scoreboard

12 June 1997	Western Province	75–32	Gauteng Falcons	Newlands Stadium, Cape Town
		Scoreboard

13 June 1997	Eastern Province	23–29	Boland	PE Stadium, Port Elizabeth
		Scoreboard

Bye/s: Gauteng Lions, Sharks

=== Round four ===
18 June 1997	SWD Eagles	22–26	Sharks	Outeniqua Park, George
		Scoreboard

20 June 1997	Border	41–23	Mpumalanga Pumas	Waverley Park, East London
		Scoreboard

Bye/s: Boland, Eastern Province, Free State Cheetahs, Gauteng Falcons, Gauteng Lions, Griqualand West, North West, Northern Free State, Northern Transvaal, Western Province

=== Round five ===
27 June 1997	Border	5–13	Griqualand West	Waverley Park, East London
		Scoreboard

Bye/s: Boland, Eastern Province, Free State Cheetahs, Gauteng Falcons, Gauteng Lions, Mpumalanga Pumas, Sharks, North West, Northern Free State, Northern Transvaal, SWD Eagles, Western Province

=== Round six ===
9 July 1997	Free State Cheetahs	75–19	Eastern Province	Free State Stadium, Bloemfontein
		Scoreboard

10 July 1997	Boland	54–23	North West	Boland Stadium, Wellington
		Scoreboard

10 July 1997	Border	16–20	SWD Eagles	Waverley Park, East London
		Scoreboard

10 July 1997	Gauteng Falcons	26–23	Northern Transvaal	Bosman Stadium, Brakpan
	Try: Jaco Viljoen, Gert Peens; Con: Gert Peens (2); Pen: Gert Peens (4)	Scoreboard	Try: Johann Schutte (2), Conrad Breytenbach; Con: Casper Steyn; Pen: Casper Steyn (2)

10 July 1997	Griqualand West	13–24	Sharks	Griqua Park, Kimberley
		Scoreboard

10 July 1997	Northern Free State	24–43	Western Province	North West Stadium, Welkom
		Scoreboard

11 July 1997	Gauteng Lions	27–26	Mpumalanga Pumas	Ellis Park Stadium, Johannesburg
		Scoreboard

=== Round seven ===
17 July 1997	SWD Eagles	22–13	Eastern Province	Outeniqua Park, George
		Scoreboard

Bye/s: Boland, Border, Free State Cheetahs, Gauteng Falcons, Gauteng Lions, Griqualand West, Mpumalanga Pumas, Sharks, North West, Northern Free State, Northern Transvaal, Western Province

=== Round eight ===
23 July 1997	North West	24–38	Free State Cheetahs	Olën Park, Potchefstroom
		Scoreboard

24 July 1997	Eastern Province	13–46	Gauteng Lions	PE Stadium, Port Elizabeth
		Scoreboard

24 July 1997	Griqualand West	28–28	Boland	Griqua Park, Kimberley
		Scoreboard

24 July 1997	Sharks	56–10	Gauteng Falcons	University of Natal, Durban
		Scoreboard

24 July 1997	Northern Transvaal	34–36	Northern Free State	Pietersburg
	Try: Brent Moyle, Conrad Breytenbach, Jannie Claassens, Adriaan Richter; Con: Casper Steyn; Pen: Casper Steyn (3), Johan Grobbelaar	Scoreboard	Try: Stephen Nieuwenhuyzen (2), Willie Nagel; Con: Eric Herbert (3); Pen: Eric Herbert (3); Drop: Eric Herbert (2)

25 July 1997	Western Province	56–15	Border	Newlands Stadium, Cape Town
		Scoreboard

Bye/s: Mpumalanga Pumas, SWD Eagles

=== Round nine ===
30 July 1997	Free State Cheetahs	38–24	Griqualand West	Free State Stadium, Bloemfontein
		Scoreboard

31 July 1997	Boland	29–30	Western Province	Boland Stadium, Wellington
		Scoreboard

31 July 1997	Gauteng Falcons	22–34	SWD Eagles	Bosman Stadium, Brakpan
		Scoreboard

31 July 1997	Gauteng Lions	60–34	North West	Ellis Park Stadium, Johannesburg
		Scoreboard

31 July 1997	Mpumalanga Pumas	28–20	Eastern Province	Johann van Riebeeck Stadium, Witbank
		Scoreboard

31 July 1997	Northern Free State	17–61	Sharks	North West Stadium, Welkom
		Scoreboard

1 August 1997	Border	20–39	Northern Transvaal	Waverley Park, East London
	Try: David Maidza, Greg Hechter; Con: Greg Miller (2); Pen: Greg Miller (2)	Scoreboard	Try: Schutte Bekker (2), Peet van Deventer, Conrad Breytenbach; Con: Roland de Marigny (2); Pen: Roland de Marigny (5)

=== Round ten ===
6 August 1997	Northern Transvaal	26–23	Boland	Loftus Versfeld, Pretoria
	Try: Jannie Claassens; Pen: Roland de Marigny (6); Drop: Roland de Marigny	Scoreboard	Try: Stefan Terblanche (2); Con: Pieter O’Neil (2); Pen: Pieter O’Neil (3)

7 August 1997	Free State Cheetahs	22–31	Western Province	Free State Stadium, Bloemfontein
		Scoreboard

7 August 1997	Sharks	76–6	Border	University of Natal, Durban
		Scoreboard

7 August 1997	North West	30–3	Mpumalanga Pumas	Olën Park, Potchefstroom
		Scoreboard

7 August 1997	SWD Eagles	64–31	Northern Free State	Outeniqua Park, George
		Scoreboard

8 August 1997	Gauteng Lions	46–37	Griqualand West	Ellis Park Stadium, Johannesburg
		Scoreboard

Bye/s: Eastern Province, Gauteng Falcons

=== Round eleven ===
13 August 1997	Eastern Province	18–7	North West	PE Stadium, Port Elizabeth
		Scoreboard

13 August 1997	Northern Free State	51–25	Gauteng Falcons	North West Stadium, Welkom
		Scoreboard

14 August 1997	Boland	31–42	Sharks	Boland Stadium, Wellington
		Scoreboard

14 August 1997	Free State Cheetahs	57–27	Northern Transvaal	Free State Stadium, Bloemfontein
	Try: Jan-Harm van Wyk (3), Chris Badenhorst, Jannie de Beer, Ryno Opperman; Con: Jannie de Beer (6); Pen: Jannie de Beer (5)	Scoreboard	Try: Nicky van der Walt, Wium Basson; Con: Roland de Marigny; Pen: Roland de Marigny (5)

14 August 1997	Mpumalanga Pumas	13–36	Griqualand West	Johann van Riebeeck Stadium, Witbank
		Scoreboard

15 August 1997	Western Province	53–16	Gauteng Lions	Newlands Stadium, Cape Town
		Scoreboard

Bye/s: Border, SWD Eagles

=== Round twelve ===
27 August 1997	Gauteng Falcons	57–29	Border	Bosman Stadium, Brakpan
		Scoreboard

27 August 1997	Griqualand West	43–34	Eastern Province	Griqua Park, Kimberley
		Scoreboard

28 August 1997	Northern Transvaal	19–15	Gauteng Lions	Loftus Versfeld, Pretoria
	Try: Kosie Alberts; Con: Roland de Marigny; Pen: Roland de Marigny (4)	Scoreboard	Pen: Johan Roux (5)

28 August 1997	SWD Eagles	17–24	Boland	Outeniqua Park, George
		Scoreboard

28 August 1997	Western Province	52–7	Mpumalanga Pumas	Newlands Stadium, Cape Town
		Scoreboard

29 August 1997	Sharks	23–11	Free State Cheetahs	University of Natal, Durban
		Scoreboard

Bye/s: North West, Northern Free State

=== Round thirteen ===
3 September 1997	North West	21–47	Griqualand West	Olën Park, Potchefstroom
		Scoreboard

4 September 1997	Boland	59–33	Gauteng Falcons	Boland Stadium, Wellington
		Scoreboard

4 September 1997	Border	56–23	Northern Free State	Waverley Park, East London
		Scoreboard

4 September 1997	Free State Cheetahs	69–15	SWD Eagles	Free State Stadium, Bloemfontein
		Scoreboard

4 September 1997	Mpumalanga Pumas	16–36	Northern Transvaal	Johann van Riebeeck Stadium, Witbank
	Try: Dan van Zyl; Con: Eben von Gericke; Pen: Eben von Gericke (3)	Scoreboard	Try: Archer Dames, Lourens Campher, Joost van der Westhuizen (2); Con: Roland de Marigny, Casper Steyn; Pen: Roland de Marigny (3), Casper Steyn

4 September 1997	Sharks	41–17	Gauteng Lions	University of Natal, Durban
		Scoreboard

5 September 1997	Eastern Province	23–39	Western Province	PE Stadium, Port Elizabeth
		Scoreboard

=== Round fourteen ===
10 September 1997	Northern Free State	32–75	Boland	North West Stadium, Welkom
		Scoreboard

10 September 1997	Northern Transvaal	40–9	Eastern Province	Loftus Versfeld, Pretoria
	Try: Archer Dames (2), Casper Steyn, Grant Esterhuizen, Nicky van der Walt; Con: Roland de Marigny, Casper Steyn (2); Pen: Roland de Marigny (2), Casper Steyn	Scoreboard	Pen: Chris Beukes (2); Drop: Chris Beukes

11 September 1997	Gauteng Falcons	3–38	Free State Cheetahs	Isak Steyl Stadium, Vanderbijlpark
		Scoreboard

11 September 1997	Sharks	29–19	Mpumalanga Pumas	University of Natal, Durban
		Scoreboard

11 September 1997	SWD Eagles	20–25	Gauteng Lions	Outeniqua Park, George
		Scoreboard

12 September 1997	Western Province	52–18	North West	Newlands Stadium, Cape Town
		Scoreboard

Bye/s: Border, Griqualand West

=== Round fifteen ===
17 September 1997	Free State Cheetahs	106–0	Northern Free State	Free State Stadium, Bloemfontein
		Scoreboard

17 September 1997	North West	17–38	Northern Transvaal	Olën Park, Potchefstroom
	Try: Bertus Kruger; Pen: Bertus Kruger (4)	Scoreboard	Try: Casper Steyn (2), Archer Dames (2), Roland de Marigny, Johan Schutte; Con: Casper Steyn; Pen: Roland de Marigny, Casper Steyn	Attendance: 7,000

18 September 1997	Boland	40–22	Border	Boland Stadium, Wellington
		Scoreboard

18 September 1997	Gauteng Lions	79–32	Gauteng Falcons	Ellis Park Stadium, Johannesburg
		Scoreboard

18 September 1997	Griqualand West	6–30	Western Province	Griqua Park, Kimberley
		Scoreboard

18 September 1997	Mpumalanga Pumas	29–30	SWD Eagles	Johann van Riebeeck Stadium, Witbank
		Scoreboard

19 September 1997	Eastern Province	26–57	Sharks	PE Stadium, Port Elizabeth
		Scoreboard

=== Round sixteen ===
24 September 1997	Gauteng Falcons	29–35	Mpumalanga Pumas	Bosman Stadium, Brakpan
		Scoreboard

24 September 1997	Northern Free State	17–89	Gauteng Lions	North West Stadium, Welkom
		Scoreboard

25 September 1997	Sharks	69–14	North West	University of Natal, Durban
		Scoreboard

25 September 1997	Northern Transvaal	15–12	Griqualand West	Loftus Versfeld, Pretoria
	Try: Joost van der Westhuizen, Roland de Marigny; Con: Casper Steyn; Pen: Casper Steyn	Scoreboard	Try: Abrie Pretorius, Robert Markram; Con: Franco Smith

26 September 1997	Border	3–50	Free State Cheetahs	Waverley Park, East London
		Scoreboard

Bye/s: Boland, Eastern Province, SWD Eagles, Western Province

=== Round seventeen ===
1 October 1997	Gauteng Lions	83–21	Border	Ellis Park Stadium, Johannesburg
		Scoreboard

1 October 1997	Mpumalanga Pumas	66–35	Northern Free State	Johann van Riebeeck Stadium, Witbank
		Scoreboard

2 October 1997	Eastern Province	45–17	Gauteng Falcons	PE Stadium, Port Elizabeth
		Scoreboard

2 October 1997	North West	17–45	SWD Eagles	Olën Park, Potchefstroom
		Scoreboard

2 October 1997	Western Province	52–34	Northern Transvaal	Newlands Stadium, Cape Town
	Try: James Small (2), Louis Blom, Andrew Aitken, Justin Swart, Christian Stewart, Louis Koen, Peet Arnold; Con: Louis Koen (7)	Scoreboard	Try: Conrad Breytenbach, Graeme Bouwer, Johan Schutte, Johan Otto; Con: Casper Steyn (4); Pen: Casper Steyn (2)

3 October 1997	Free State Cheetahs	38–22	Boland	Free State Stadium, Bloemfontein
		Scoreboard

Bye/s: Griqualand West, Sharks

=== Round eighteen ===
8 October 1997	Gauteng Falcons	24–45	Griqualand West	Bosman Stadium, Brakpan
		Scoreboard

8 October 1997	Northern Free State	29–44	North West	North West Stadium, Welkom
		Scoreboard

8 October 1997	SWD Eagles	26–32	Western Province	Outeniqua Park, George
		Scoreboard

9 October 1997	Boland	17–37	Mpumalanga Pumas	Boland Stadium, Wellington
		Scoreboard

9 October 1997	Border	28–23	Eastern Province	Waverley Park, East London
		Scoreboard

9 October 1997	Gauteng Lions	24–53	Free State Cheetahs	Ellis Park Stadium, Johannesburg
		Scoreboard

9 October 1997	Northern Transvaal	33–28	Sharks	Loftus Versfeld, Pretoria
	Try: Nicky van der Walt, Graeme Bouwer, Gerhard Laufs; Con: Casper Steyn (3); Pen: Casper Steyn (4)	Scoreboard	Try: Cabous van der Westhuizen (2), Shaun Payne; Con: Gavin Lawless (2); Pen: Gavin Lawless (2)

=== Semi-finals ===
16 October 1997	Sharks	22–40	Free State Cheetahs	University of Natal, Durban
		Scoreboard

16 October 1997	Western Province	38–18	Gauteng Lions	Newlands Stadium, Cape Town
		Scoreboard

=== Final ===
23 October 1997	Western Province	14–12	Free State Cheetahs	Newlands Stadium, Cape Town
		Scoreboard

== Honours ==
The honour roll for the 1997 Currie Cup was:

1997 Currie Cup Honours
Champions:	Western Province (29th title)
