= Brent Moyle =

South African rugby union player

- Born: 31 March 1974 (age 52)
- Height: 189 cm (6 ft 2 in)
- Weight: 116 kg (256 lb)
- School: Jeppe High School for Boys

Rugby union career
- Position: Prop
Senior career
Years	Team	Apps	(Points)
2001–03	Castres Olympique		
2003–04	Montferrand		
Super Rugby
Years	Team	Apps	(Points)
- Bulls
- Sharks

Brent Moyle (born 31 March 1974) is a South African former professional rugby union player.

Moyle attended Jeppe High School for Boys, where he played under future Springboks coach Jake White.

A prop, Moyle was a Springboks squad member and had several seasons in the Super 12, mostly with the Sharks. He played his rugby in France from 2001 to 2004, with two seasons at Castres Olympique, then one playing for AS Montferrand. His lack of discipline on the field often saw him cited for foul play.
