= Archer Dames =

South African rugby league player

Personal information
- Born: South Africa

Playing information
- Position: Wing
Representative
Years	Team	Pld	T	G	FG	P
2000	South Africa	3	0	0	0	0

Archer Dames is a South African rugby league player who represented South Africa in the 2000 World Cup.

He also played rugby union, representing the Blue Bulls and Pumas in the Currie Cup and representing the South Africa national rugby sevens team at the 1999 Paris Sevens.
