= John Dobson (rugby union coach) =

South African rugby union coach

- Born: 1970 (age 55–56) Welkom, Free State

Rugby union career
Coaching career
- Years: Team
- 2008–2010: UCT Ikey Tigers
- 2009: Roma (technical director)
- 2011: UCT Ikey Tigers (technical adviser)
- 2010–2014: Western Province U21
- 2011–2015: Western Province (Vodacom Cup team)
- 2015–Present: Western Province (Currie Cup team)
- 2019–Present: Stormers (URC team)

John Dobson is a South African rugby union coach, currently the head coach of United Rugby Championship side Stormers.

== Career ==
=== Playing career ===
As a player, Dobson played as a hooker for Western Province, as well as amateur club sides in the Western Province Super League such as UCT Ikey Tigers, Villagers and Northerns. He also had spells in Italy at Valpolicella Rugby Club and Verona Rugby and Portugal.

=== UCT Ikey Tigers / Roma ===
He was the head coach of the UCT Ikey Tigers for their first three seasons in the Varsity Cup competition from 2008 to 2010. He guided them to the final in the inaugural 2008 season, where they lost to Western Cape rivals Maties and helped them reach the play-offs again in 2009, losing 17–19 to NWU Pukke in the semi-final.

Dobson was appointed as the technical director of Italian National Championship of Excellence side Roma for the 2009–10 season. He was due to coach new Italian franchise Praetorians Roma in the 2010–11 Celtic League, but their inclusion in the European competition never materialised, with Benetton Treviso being included instead. He returned to South Africa to guide UCT Ikey Tigers the final of the 2010 Varsity Cup, where a repeat of the 2008 final also saw the same result, with Maties winning their third title in succession.

=== Western Province Under-21 / Vodacom Cup ===
In 2010, Dobson was appointed as the coach of the Western Province U21 side and he helped them win the 2010 Under-21 Provincial Championship in his first season in charge, as they beat the Blue Bulls U21s 43–32 in the final in Durban. He returned as a technical adviser to his former assistant Kevin Foote for the UCT Ikey Tigers' 2011 Varsity Cup campaign, which they won for the first time, beating UP Tuks 26–16 in the final.

He also took over Western Province's Vodacom Cup team and helped them to a quarter final spot in 2011, where they lost 19–21 to a Sharks XV. In the second half of the season, his Western Province Under-21 side reached the semi-final of the 2011 Under-21 Provincial Championship, but Dobson lost out to the same opposition, with the Sharks U21s winning the match 19–12.

Western Province won the Vodacom Cup under Dobson's tutelage for the first and only time in 2012, beating five-time champions Griquas 20–18 in Kimberley. Dobson reached another final with the Under-21 side, but they fell short in the 2012 Under-21 Provincial Championship, losing 13–22 to the Blue Bulls U21s.

The 2013 Vodacom Cup saw Western Province again reach the play-offs, but they lost 25–44 to eventual champions the Golden Lions in the semi-finals, but Dobson had more success at Under-21 level, winning the 2013 Under-21 Provincial Championship, beating the Blue Bulls U21s 30–23 to win their second title in three seasons.

An exit in the quarter final stage of the 2014 Vodacom Cup (losing 8–13 to the Pumas) was followed by a run to the finals for the Under-21s; however, they failed to defend their title, losing 10–20 to the Blue Bulls U21s.

Dobson once again guided Western Province to the final of the Vodacom Cup in 2015, but were defeated 7–24 by the Pumas who won their first Vodacom Cup title.

In total, Dobson guided Western Province to the Vodacom Cup play-offs for five consecutive years between 2011 and 2015, winning the title once. He also guided the Western Province Under-21s to five consecutive play-offs between 2010 and 2014, winning two titles and ending as losing finalists on two occasions.

=== Western Province Currie Cup ===
In February 2015, Dobson was appointed as the head coach of Western Province's Currie Cup for the 2015 Currie Cup Premier Division, taking over from Allister Coetzee, who departed to Japan to take over at the Kobelco Steelers. In his first season of charge, he guided Western Province for the Currie Cup final – their fourth consecutive final appearance – but they fell short, losing the final 24–32 against the Golden Lions.

In 2016, Dobson's Western Province finished in top spot of the 2016 Currie Cup qualification series, winning thirteen of their fourteen matches during the competition.

== Personal life ==
Away from the coaching field, Dobson holds a Law Degree, a master's degree in Business Administration and another one in Creative Writing, which he attained at the University of Cape Town. He is the founder of the 365 Media Group and the Rugby365 website. He is also an author and so far published two novels, Year of the Gherkin in 2012 and Year of the Turnip in 2016.
