= 1994 Currie Cup =

South African sporting competition

- Champions: Transvaal
- Runners-up: Free State
- Matches played: 31

The 1994 Currie Cup (known as the Bankfin Currie Cup for sponsorship reasons) was the 56th season in the South African Currie Cup competition since it started in 1889. Transvaal defeated Orange Free State 56-33 to win the final.

== Competition ==
=== Regular season and title playoffs ===
There were 6 participating teams in the 1994 Currie Cup. These teams played each other twice over the course of the season, once at home and once away.

Teams received two points for a win and one point for a draw.

The top two teams qualified for the final.

== Teams ==
Location of teams in the 1994 Currie Cup

=== Changes from 1993 ===
- None.

=== Team Listing ===
Team	Stadium
Eastern Province	Boet Erasmus Stadium, Port Elizabeth
Natal	Kings Park Stadium, Durban
Northern Transvaal	Loftus Versfeld Stadium, Pretoria
Orange Free State	Free State Stadium, Bloemfontein
Transvaal	Ellis Park Stadium, Johannesburg
Western Province	Newlands Stadium, Cape Town

== Log ==
1994 Currie Cup
Pos	Team	Pld	W	D	L	PF	PA	PD	TF	TA	Pts	Qualification
1	Orange Free State	10	7	0	3	283	265	+18	27	27	14	Final
2	Transvaal	10	6	0	4	276	237	+39	25	19	12	Final
3	Western Province	10	5	0	5	267	190	+77	24	14	10	
4	Natal	10	4	0	6	231	208	+23	19	17	8	
5	Northern Transvaal	10	4	0	6	245	321	−76	23	32	8	
6	Eastern Province	10	4	0	6	236	317	−81	24	33	8	

Rules for classification: 2 points for a win; 1 point for a draw

== Matches ==
=== Round 1 ===
28 May 1994

Natal	56 – 14	Eastern Province

Kings Park Stadium, Durban

29 May 1994

Orange Free State	31 – 22	Western Province

Free State Stadium, Bloemfontein

Bye/s: Northern Transvaal, Transvaal

=== Round 2 ===
18 June 1994

Eastern Province	51 – 10	Orange Free State

Boet Erasmus Stadium, Port Elizabeth

18 June 1994

Transvaal	19 – 25	Natal

Ellis Park Stadium, Johannesburg

18 June 1994

Western Province	32 – 7	Northern Transvaal

Newlands Stadium, Cape Town

=== Round 3 ===
2 July 1994

Northern Transvaal	22 – 17	Eastern Province

Loftus Versfeld Stadium, Pretoria

2 July 1994

Orange Free State	33 – 16	Transvaal

Free State Stadium, Bloemfontein

Bye/s: Natal, Western Province

=== Round 4 ===
9 July 1994

Eastern Province	23 – 15	Western Province

Boet Erasmus Stadium, Port Elizabeth

9 July 1994

Natal	22 – 30	Orange Free State

Kings Park Stadium, Durban

9 July 1994

Transvaal	57 – 13	Northern Transvaal

Ellis Park Stadium, Johannesburg

=== Round 5 ===
16 July 1994

Northern Transvaal	23 – 12	Natal

Loftus Versfeld Stadium, Pretoria

16 July 1994

Western Province	16 – 24	Transvaal

Newlands Stadium, Cape Town

Bye/s: Eastern Province, Orange Free State

=== Round 6 ===
23 July 1994

Natal	19 – 18	Western Province

Kings Park Stadium, Durban

23 July 1994

Orange Free State	34 – 27	Northern Transvaal

Free State Stadium, Bloemfontein

23 July 1994

Transvaal	28 – 30	Eastern Province

Ellis Park Stadium, Johannesburg

=== Round 7 ===
13 August 1994

Eastern Province	16 – 14	Natal

Boet Erasmus Stadium, Port Elizabeth

13 August 1994

Western Province	26 – 6	Orange Free State

Newlands Stadium, Cape Town

Bye/s: Northern Transvaal, Transvaal

=== Round 8 ===
20 August 1994

Natal	12 – 16	Transvaal

Kings Park Stadium, Durban

20 August 1994

Northern Transvaal	25 – 34	Western Province

Loftus Versfeld Stadium, Pretoria

20 August 1994

Orange Free State	55 – 22	Eastern Province

Free State Stadium, Bloemfontein

=== Round 9 ===
27 August 1994

Eastern Province	23 – 26	Northern Transvaal

Boet Erasmus Stadium, Port Elizabeth

27 August 1994

Transvaal	31 – 29	Orange Free State

Ellis Park Stadium, Johannesburg

Bye/s: Natal, Western Province

=== Round 10 ===
10 September 1994

Northern Transvaal	44 – 35	Transvaal

Loftus Versfeld Stadium, Pretoria

10 September 1994

Orange Free State	22 – 18	Natal

Free State Stadium, Bloemfontein

10 September 1994

Western Province	65 – 22	Eastern Province

Newlands Stadium, Cape Town

=== Round 11 ===
17 September 1994

Natal	44 – 28	Northern Transvaal

Kings Park Stadium, Durban

17 September 1994

Transvaal	24 – 17	Western Province

Ellis Park Stadium, Johannesburg

Bye/s: Eastern Province, Orange Free State

=== Round 12 ===
24 September 1994

Eastern Province	18 – 26	Transvaal

Boet Erasmus Stadium, Port Elizabeth

24 September 1994

Northern Transvaal	30 – 33	Orange Free State

Loftus Versfeld Stadium, Pretoria

24 September 1994

Western Province	22 – 9	Natal

Newlands Stadium, Cape Town

=== Final ===
1 October 1994

Orange Free State	33 – 56	Transvaal

Free State Stadium, Bloemfontein
