= Jacques Nienaber =

South African rugby union player

- Born: 16 October 1972 (age 54) Kimberley, Northern Cape Province, South Africa
- School: Grey College, Bloemfontein
- University: University of the Free State

Rugby union career
- Position: Flanker
Coaching career
- Years: Team
- 2008–2014: Western Province (Assistant/Defence coach)
- 2008–2014: Stormers (Assistant/Defence coach)
- 2011–2015: South Africa (Assistant coach)
- 2016–2017: Munster (Assistant coach)
- 2018–2019: South Africa (Assistant coach)
- 2020–2023: South Africa
- 2023–pres.: Leinster (Senior coach)
Medal record
Men's rugby union
Representing South Africa (as coach)
Rugby World Cup
Gold medal – first place	2023 France	Squad

Jacques Nienaber (born 16 October 1972) is a South African rugby union coach who is currently the senior coach at Leinster. He led South Africa to their 4th World Cup title in 2023.

== Early life ==
Nienaber was born in 1972 in Kimberley, Cape Province and grew up in Welkom and Bloemfontein, where he attended Grey College. He attended the University of the Free State, where he first began to work in partnership with Rassie Erasmus. Nienaber and Rassie had known each other from their conscription in the South African Army.

== Rugby union coaching career ==
=== 1997–2007: Free State Cheetahs/Cats/Cheetahs ===
He is a qualified physiotherapist and worked for the Bloemfontein-based provincial rugby union team, the Free State Cheetahs, in that capacity since 1997. When the Free State Cheetahs were formally included as part of the Cats Super 12 franchise for the 1998 season, Nienaber also held the same role for them.

In 2004, he also took over the role of Strength and Conditioning Coach at the Free State Cheetahs. He remained in that role when former South African national team flanker Rassie Erasmus took over as head coach in 2005, in a season that saw the team win the domestic Currie Cup trophy for only the second time in their history. The expansion of the Super 12 to 14 teams for the 2006 season saw the Cats effectively split into the Lions and Cheetahs franchises and Nienaber was appointed the Strength and Conditioning Coach of the new Cheetahs franchise, where he again worked under head coach Erasmus. They helped the Cheetahs to a 10th and 11th-placed finish in 2006 and 2007 respectively, and also won the Currie Cup again with the Free State Cheetahs, sharing the title with the Blue Bulls in 2006.

=== 2008–2015: Western Province/Stormers/South Africa ===
Nienaber moved to Cape Town to join Erasmus' staff when he was appointed Director of Rugby at Super Rugby franchise the Stormers and Currie Cup side Western Province prior to the 2008 season, moving into a role as a defence coach.

After missing out on the play-offs in 2008 and 2009, an improvement in defence – which saw Western Province end the 2009 Currie Cup season with the fewest points conceded – also led to an improvement of the Stormers' fortunes. In 2010, the team finished second after the regular season, having conceded just 171 points in 13 matches, 117 points less than the Waratahs, who had the second-best defence. The team made it all the way to the final, where they lost to fellow South African side the Bulls and Western Province achieved the same feat domestically, before losing to the Sharks in the 2010 Currie Cup final. Nienaber's record as a defence coach was noted by the South African national team, and was approached to join their staff, but the move was blocked by his existing employers.

The Stormers again reached the play-offs in 2011 with the second best defensive record, and Western Province had the best defensive record in the 2011 Currie Cup. He was once again approached by the national team, and he was included in their coaching staff for the 2011 Rugby World Cup. South Africa had the best defensive record in the pool stage before losing 9–11 to Australia in the quarter finals.

He returned to domestic coaching with the Stormers and Western Province for 2012, as both teams again had the best defensive records in their respective competitions, with the Stormers reaching the semi-finals of the Super Rugby competition, while Nienaber tasted his first success with Western Province, as the team won the 2012 Currie Cup.

Despite interest from other teams such as the Bulls, Nienaber remained with the Stormers and also joined the South African Rugby Union's newly formed Mobi-Unit, a coaching team headed up by Rassie Erasmus that would visit various teams at all levels of the game to impart coaching knowledge.

The Stormers missed out on the 2013 Super Rugby play-offs despite having the best defensive record, while Western Province reached the 2013 Currie Cup final, which they lost to the Sharks. The Stormers endured a very poor season in 2014, finishing 11th, but Western Province won the 2014 Currie Cup final, their second during Nienaber's time at the team. At the end of 2014, they agreed to release him from his contract to join the SARU coaching staff on a full-time basis.

=== 2016–2017: Munster ===
In April 2016, Rassie Erasmus was appointed as the Director of Rugby of Munster on a three-year contract, and Nienaber followed Erasmus, joining the Irish Pro12 side as a defence coach on a three-year contract.

=== South Africa ===
==== 2018–2019 ====
When Rassie Erasmus accepted the position of Director of Rugby for SA Rugby, he made sure that his lieutenant Nienaber would have a role to play in the South African national set-up. Erasmus was subsequently called upon in 2018 to steady the ship as the Springboks endured a poor run of form under coach Allister Coetzee, but he always made it clear that he was not interested in the job long-term.

==== 2020–2023 ====
In January 2020, Nienaber was announced as the new head coach of the Springboks and handed the keys to a World Champion squad. Unusually, Nienaber had no experience as a head coach at the time. He would have to wait a full year due to the Covid-19 pandemic before finally fielding his first team against Georgia on 2 July 2021 ahead of the 2021 British and Irish Lions series. The Springboks ended up winning the renowned series against the Lions 2–1, coming from behind after very narrowly losing the first test in Cape Town.

In October 2023, Nienaber was head coach as the Springboks retained the Rugby World Cup.It has been announced that he will depart the role of head coach for the South African team after the world cup to take up a position in the Leinster Rugby coaching team under Leo Cullen.

=== 2023–present: Leinster ===
In December 2023, Nienaber coached his first professional game with Leinster in an away fixture against Connacht. Leinster won the game in the final minutes with a try from Ciarán Frawley. Leinster won the 2024-25 United Rugby Championship, and successfully defended their title in 2025-26. Leinster reached the finals of 2024 and 2026 European Rugby Champions Cup, losing both finals to Toulouse and Bordeaux Bègles.

Preceded by (South Africa) Rassie Erasmus	South Africa National Rugby Union Coach; 2020–2023	Succeeded by (South Africa) Rassie Erasmus
