= Qatar Airways Cup =

Rugby union trophy

- Sport: Rugby union
- Founded: 2023
- No. of teams: 4
- Most recent champion: South Africa (2025)
- Most titles: South Africa (3)

The Qatar Airways Cup is a rugby union trophy awarded to the winner of an annual one-off fixture played in between South Africa and another team. It is currently held by South Africa since their victory in 2025.

The first Qatar Airways Cup match was won by South Africa, who beat New Zealand 35–7 at Twickenham Stadium on 15 August 2023.

== Results ==
No.	Date	Venue	Winner	Score	Opposition	Match report
1	25 August 2023	Twickenham Stadium, London	South Africa	35–7	New Zealand	
2	22 June 2024	Twickenham Stadium, London	South Africa	43–13	Wales	
3	28 June 2025	DHL Stadium, Cape Town	South Africa	54–7	Barbarians	
