= 2021 France rugby union tour of Australia =

- Coach: Fabien Galthié
- Tour captain: Anthony Jelonch
Summary
P	W	D	L
Total
3	1	0	2
Test match
3	1	0	2
Opponent
P	W	D	L
Australia
3	1	0	2

Tour chronology
- ← New Zealand 2018 Japan 2022 →

In July 2021, France played a three-test series against Australia as part of the 2021 July International window. The series was played in a condensed window of 11 days, due to French club commitments and a COVID-19 hotel quarantine period for the visitors. This was France's first tour to Australia since 2014 and their first encounter since November 2016.

== Fixtures ==
Date	Venue	Home	Score	Away
7 July 2021	Suncorp Stadium, Brisbane (Note: Relocated to Suncorp from the Sydney Cricket Ground following new lockdown measures in Sydney.)	Australia	23–21	France
13 July 2021	Melbourne Rectangular Stadium, Melbourne	Australia	26–28	France
17 July 2021	Suncorp Stadium, Brisbane	Australia	33–30	France

== Squads ==
Note: Ages, caps and clubs are as per 7 July, the first test match of the tour.

=== France ===
On 20 June 2021, Galthié named a 42-man squad for France's three-test series against Australia.

Coaching team:

- Head coach: (France) Fabien Galthié
- Forwards coach: (France) William Servat
- Backs coach: (France) Laurent Labit
- Defence coach: (England) Shaun Edwards

Player	Position	Date of birth (age)	Caps	Club/province
Gaëtan Barlot	Hooker	13 April 1997 (aged 24)	0	(France) Castres
Anthony Étrillard	Hooker	21 March 1993 (aged 28)	0	(France) Toulon
Etienne Fourcade	Hooker	11 April 1997 (aged 24)	0	(France) Clermont
Demba Bamba	Prop	17 March 1998 (aged 23)	14	(France) Lyon
Sipili Falatea	Prop	6 June 1997 (aged 24)	0	(France) Clermont
Enzo Forletta	Prop	6 June 1997 (aged 24)	0	(France) Montpellier
Jean-Baptiste Gros	Prop	29 May 1999 (aged 22)	9	(France) Toulon
Wilfrid Hounkpatin	Prop	29 July 1991 (aged 29)	0	(France) Castres
Quentin Walcker	Prop	21 February 1996 (aged 25)	0	(France) Perpignan
Pierre-Henri Azagoh	Lock	27 May 1998 (aged 23)	0	(France) Stade Français
Cyril Cazeaux	Lock	10 February 1995 (aged 26)	2	(France) Bordeaux
Kilian Geraci	Lock	25 March 1999 (aged 22)	2	(France) Lyon
Romain Taofifénua	Lock	14 September 1990 (aged 30)	25	(France) Toulon
Florent Vanverberghe	Lock	22 July 2000 (aged 20)	0	(France) Castres
Alexandre Bécognée	Back row	3 September 1996 (aged 24)	0	(France) Montpellier
Dylan Cretin	Back row	4 May 1997 (aged 24)	10	(France) Lyon
Ibrahim Diallo	Back row	23 January 1998 (aged 23)	0	(France) Racing 92
Alexandre Fischer	Back row	19 January 1998 (aged 23)	0	(France) Clermont
Anthony Jelonch (c)	Back row	28 July 1996 (aged 24)	8	(France) Castres
Sekou Macalou	Back row	20 April 1995 (aged 26)	4	(France) Stade Français
Baptiste Pesenti	Back row	3 July 1997 (aged 24)	2	(France) Pau
Patrick Sobela	Back row	12 August 1992 (aged 28)	0	(France) Lyon
Cameron Woki	Back row	7 November 1998 (aged 22)	5	(France) Bordeaux
Baptiste Couilloud	Scrum-half	22 July 1997 (aged 23)	5	(France) Lyon
Teddy Iribaren	Scrum-half	25 September 1990 (aged 30)	0	(France) Racing 92
Clovis Le Bail	Scrum-half	20 November 1995 (aged 25)	0	(France) Pau
Louis Carbonel	Fly-half	4 February 1999 (aged 22)	3	(France) Toulon
Antoine Hastoy	Fly-half	4 June 1997 (aged 24)	0	(France) Pau
Joris Segonds	Fly-half	6 April 1997 (aged 24)	0	(France) Stade Français
Pierre-Louis Barassi	Centre	22 April 1998 (aged 23)	2	(France) Lyon
Jonathan Danty	Centre	7 October 1992 (aged 28)	6	(France) Stade Français
Julien Hériteau	Centre	12 January 1994 (aged 27)	0	(France) Toulon
Tani Vili	Centre	31 October 2000 (aged 20)	0	(France) Clermont
Arthur Vincent	Centre	30 September 1999 (aged 21)	11	(France) Montpellier
Gervais Cordin	Wing	10 December 1998 (aged 22)	0	(France) Toulon
Damian Penaud	Wing	25 September 1996 (aged 24)	22	(France) Clermont
Alivereti Raka	Wing	9 December 1994 (aged 26)	5	(France) Clermont
Teddy Thomas	Wing	18 September 1993 (aged 27)	27	(France) Racing 92
Gabin Villière	Wing	13 December 1995 (aged 25)	4	(France) Toulon
Anthony Bouthier	Fullback	19 June 1992 (aged 29)	6	(France) Montpellier
Romain Buros	Fullback	31 July 1997 (aged 23)	0	(France) Bordeaux
Melvyn Jaminet	Fullback	30 June 1999 (aged 22)	0	(France) Perpignan

=== Australia ===
A 38-man Wallabies squad was named for the 2021 series against France on 13 June 2021.

Coaching team:

- Head coach: (New Zealand) Dave Rennie
- Forwards coach: (Australia) Dan McKellar
- Backs coach: (Australia) Scott Wisemantel
- Defence coach: (Australia) Matt Taylor

Player	Position	Date of birth (age)	Caps	Club/province
Feleti Kaitu'u	Hooker	30 December 1994 (aged 26)	0	Force
Lachlan Lonergan	Hooker	11 October 1999 (aged 21)	0	Brumbies
Brandon Paenga-Amosa	Hooker	25 December 1995 (aged 25)	9	Reds
Allan Alaalatoa	Prop	28 January 1994 (aged 27)	43	Brumbies
Angus Bell	Prop	10 April 2000 (aged 21)	3	Waratahs
Pone Fa'amausili	Prop	26 February 1997 (aged 24)	0	Rebels
Scott Sio	Prop	16 October 1991 (aged 29)	68	Brumbies
James Slipper	Prop	6 June 1989 (aged 32)	100	Brumbies
Taniela Tupou	Prop	10 May 1996 (aged 25)	25	Reds
Matt Philip	Lock	7 March 1994 (aged 27)	9	Unattached
Lukhan Salakaia-Loto	Lock	19 September 1996 (aged 24)	25	Reds
Darcy Swain	Lock	5 July 1997 (aged 24)	0	Brumbies
Sitaleki Timani	Lock	19 September 1986 (aged 34)	18	Force
Michael Hooper (c)	Back row	29 October 1991 (aged 29)	105	(Japan) Toyota Verblitz
Rob Leota	Back row	3 March 1997 (aged 24)	0	Rebels
Fraser McReight	Back row	19 February 1999 (aged 22)	1	Reds
Isi Naisarani	Back row	14 February 1995 (aged 26)	8	Rebels
Lachlan Swinton	Back row	16 January 1997 (aged 24)	1	Waratahs
Rob Valetini	Back row	3 September 1998 (aged 22)	4	Brumbies
Michael Wells	Back row	3 May 1993 (aged 28)	0	Rebels
Harry Wilson	Back row	22 November 1999 (aged 21)	6	Reds
Jake Gordon	Scrum-half	7 June 1993 (aged 28)	5	Waratahs
Tate McDermott	Scrum-half	18 September 1998 (aged 22)	2	Reds
Nic White	Scrum-half	13 June 1990 (aged 31)	37	Brumbies
Noah Lolesio	Fly-half	18 December 1999 (aged 21)	2	Brumbies
James O'Connor	Fly-half	5 July 1990 (aged 31)	55	Reds
Matt To'omua	Fly-half	2 January 1990 (aged 31)	54	Rebels
Lalakai Foketi	Centre	22 December 1994 (aged 26)	0	Waratahs
Reece Hodge	Centre	26 August 1994 (aged 26)	45	Rebels
Len Ikitau	Centre	1 October 1998 (aged 22)	0	Brumbies
Hunter Paisami	Centre	10 April 1998 (aged 23)	6	Reds
Izaia Perese	Centre	17 May 1997 (aged 24)	0	Waratahs
Filipo Daugunu	Wing	3 April 1995 (aged 26)	5	Reds
Andrew Kellaway	Wing	12 October 1995 (aged 25)	0	Rebels
Marika Koroibete	Wing	26 July 1992 (aged 28)	34	Rebels
Andy Muirhead	Wing	8 March 1993 (aged 28)	0	Brumbies
Tom Wright	Wing	21 July 1997 (aged 23)	3	Brumbies
Tom Banks	Fullback	18 June 1994 (aged 27)	11	Brumbies

== Matches ==
=== First test ===
7 July 2021
20:00 AEST (UTC+10)

Australia	23–21	France
Try: Paenga-Amosa 34' c Hooper 71' c Con: Lolesio (2/2) 36', 71'; Pen: Lolesio (3/3) 44', 60', 80+4'	Report	Try: Villière (2) 6' m, 22' c Con: Carbonel (1/2) 24'; Pen: Carbonel (2/2) 19', 52'; Jaminet (1/1) 62'

Lang Park, Brisbane (Note: Relocated to Suncorp from the Sydney Cricket Ground following new lockdown measures in Sydney.)
Attendance: 17,821
Referee: Brendon Pickerill (New Zealand) (Note: Swapped appointments with Paul Williams (Samoa v Tonga) after travel restrictions changed between Australia and New Zealand and Williams was unable to travel to Australia.)

FB	15	Tom Banks
RW	14	Tom Wright	(substituted off) 68'
OC	13	Hunter Paisami
IC	12	Matt To'omua
LW	11	Marika Koroibete
FH	10	Noah Lolesio
SH	9	Jake Gordon	(substituted off) 60'
N8	8	Harry Wilson	(substituted off) 72'
BF	7	Michael Hooper (c)
OF	6	Rob Valetini
RL	5	Lukhan Salakaia-Loto
LL	4	Matt Philip	(substituted off) 55'
TP	3	Allan Alaalatoa	(substituted off) 52'
HK	2	Brandon Paenga-Amosa	(substituted off) 60'
LP	1	James Slipper	(substituted off) 63'
Replacements:
HK	16	Lachlan Lonergan	(substituted on) 60'
PR	17	Angus Bell	(substituted on) 63'
PR	18	Taniela Tupou	(substituted on) 52'
LK	19	Darcy Swain	(substituted on) 55'
N8	20	Isi Naisarani	(substituted on) 72'
SH	21	Tate McDermott	(substituted on) 60'
CE	22	Len Ikitau
WG	23	Andrew Kellaway	(substituted on) 68'
Coach:
(New Zealand) Dave Rennie

FB	15	Melvyn Jaminet
RW	14	Damian Penaud
OC	13	Arthur Vincent
IC	12	Jonathan Danty
LW	11	Gabin Villière
FH	10	Louis Carbonel
SH	9	Baptiste Couilloud	(substituted off) 70'
N8	8	Sekou Macalou	(substituted off) 54'
OF	7	Anthony Jelonch (c)
BF	6	Dylan Cretin
RL	5	Romain Taofifénua	(substituted off) 52'
LL	4	Kilian Geraci	(substituted off) 58'
TP	3	Demba Bamba	(substituted off) 52'
HK	2	Gaëtan Barlot	(substituted off) 60'
LP	1	Jean-Baptiste Gros	(substituted off) 60'
Replacements:
HK	16	Anthony Étrillard	(substituted on) 60'
PR	17	Quentin Walcker	(substituted on) 60'
PR	18	Sipili Falatea	(substituted on) 52'
FL	19	Baptiste Pesenti	(substituted on) 52'
LK	20	Cyril Cazeaux	(substituted on) 58'
FL	21	Cameron Woki	(substituted on) 54'
SH	22	Teddy Iribaren	(substituted on) 70'
FB	23	Anthony Bouthier
Coach:
(France) Fabien Galthié

Assistant referees:
Nic Berry (Australia)
Damon Murphy (Australia)
Television match official:
James Doleman (New Zealand)

Notes:

- Florent Vanverberghe (France) had been named on the bench, but withdrew the day before the game due to injury and was replaced by Cyril Cazeaux.
- Andrew Kellaway Lachlan Lonergan and Darcy Swain (all Australia) and Gaëtan Barlot, Anthony Étrillard, Sipili Falatea, Teddy Iribaren, Melvyn Jaminet and Quentin Walcker (all France) made their international debuts.

=== Second test ===
13 July 2021
20:00 AEST (UTC+10)

Australia	26–28	France
Try: Gordon 38' c Hooper 71' c Con: Lolesio (2/2) 40', 72'; Pen: Lolesio (4/4) 17', 26', 46', 75'	Report	Try: Penaud 22' c Con: Jaminet (1/1) 23'; Pen: Jaminet (7/7) 2', 10', 35', 51', 56', 63', 78'

AAMI Stadium, Melbourne
Attendance: 20,113
Referee: James Doleman (New Zealand)

FB	15	Tom Banks
RW	14	Tom Wright	(substituted off) 56'
OC	13	Hunter Paisami		(substituted off) 72'
IC	12	Matt To'omua	(substituted off) 67'	(substituted on) 72'
LW	11	Marika Koroibete
FH	10	Noah Lolesio
SH	9	Jake Gordon	(substituted off) 56'
N8	8	Harry Wilson
BF	7	Michael Hooper (c)
OF	6	Rob Valetini
RL	5	Lukhan Salakaia-Loto
LL	4	Matt Philip	(substituted off) 63'
TP	3	Taniela Tupou	(substituted off) 51'
HK	2	Brandon Paenga-Amosa	(substituted off) 67'
LP	1	James Slipper	(substituted off) 63'
Replacements:
HK	16	Lachlan Lonergan	(substituted on) 67'
PR	17	Angus Bell	(substituted on) 63'
PR	18	Allan Alaalatoa	(substituted on) 51'
LK	19	Darcy Swain	(substituted on) 63'
N8	20	Isi Naisarani	(substituted on) 63'
SH	21	Tate McDermott	(substituted on) 56'
CE	22	Len Ikitau	(substituted on) 67'
WG	23	Andrew Kellaway	(substituted on) 56'
Coach:
(New Zealand) Dave Rennie

FB	15	Melvyn Jaminet
RW	14	Damian Penaud
OC	13	Arthur Vincent
IC	12	Jonathan Danty
LW	11	Gabin Villière
FH	10	Louis Carbonel
SH	9	Baptiste Couilloud	(substituted off) 78'
N8	8	Anthony Jelonch (c)
OF	7	Cameron Woki
BF	6	Ibrahim Diallo	(substituted off) 67'
RL	5	Cyril Cazeaux	(substituted off) 51'
LL	4	Pierre-Henri Azagoh	(substituted off) 63'
TP	3	Wilfrid Hounkpatin	(substituted off) 51'
HK	2	Gaëtan Barlot	(substituted off) 67'
LP	1	Jean-Baptiste Gros	(substituted off) 63'
Replacements:
HK	16	Anthony Étrillard	(substituted on) 67'
PR	17	Enzo Forletta	(substituted on) 63'
PR	18	Demba Bamba	(substituted on) 51'
LK	19	Kilian Geraci	(substituted on) 63'	(substituted off) 72'
LK	20	Romain Taofifénua	(substituted on) 51'
FL	21	Sekou Macalou	(substituted on) 67'
SH	22	Teddy Iribaren	(substituted on) 78'
FB	23	Anthony Bouthier		(substituted on) 72'
Coach:
(France) Fabien Galthié

Assistant referees:
Nic Berry (Australia)
Damon Murphy (Australia)
Television match official:
Brendon Pickerill (New Zealand)

Notes:

- Len Ikitau (Australia) and Pierre-Henri Azagoh, Ibrahim Diallo, Enzo Forletta and Wilfrid Hounkpatin (all France) made their international debuts.
- France win in Australia for the first time since their 28–19 victory in Sydney in the final test of their 1990 tour.

=== Third test ===
17 July 2021
20:00 AEST (UTC+10)

Australia	33–30	France
Try: McDermott 11' c Lolesio 20' c Tupou 51' c Con: Lolesio (3/3) 12', 21', 53'; Pen: Lolesio (4/5) 26', 40', 73', 79'	Report	Try: Couilloud 8' c Woki 36' c Barassi 47' c Con: Jaminet (3/3) 9', 37', 48'; Pen: Jaminet (3/4) 4', 14', 75'

Lang Park, Brisbane
Attendance: 34,170
Referee: Ben O'Keeffe (New Zealand)

FB	15	Tom Banks
RW	14	Filipo Daugunu		(substituted off) 2'
OC	13	Len Ikitau
IC	12	Hunter Paisami		(substituted off) 78'
LW	11	Marika Koroibete	(red card) 5'
FH	10	Noah Lolesio
SH	9	Tate McDermott		(substituted off) 73'
N8	8	Isi Naisarani		(substituted off) 71'
BF	7	Michael Hooper (c)
OF	6	Lachlan Swinton		(substituted off) 55'
RL	5	Lukhan Salakaia-Loto
LL	4	Darcy Swain
TP	3	Allan Alaalatoa		(substituted off) 47'
HK	2	Brandon Paenga-Amosa		(substituted off) 75'
LP	1	James Slipper		(substituted off) 47'
Replacements:
HK	16	Jordan Uelese		(substituted on) 75'
PR	17	Angus Bell		(substituted on) 47'
PR	18	Taniela Tupou		(substituted on) 47'
LK	19	Matt Philip		(substituted on) 71'
FL	20	Rob Valetini		(substituted on) 55'
SH	21	Jake Gordon		(substituted on) 73'
CE	22	Matt To'omua		(substituted on) 78'
FB	23	Reece Hodge		(substituted on) 2'
Coach:
(New Zealand) Dave Rennie

FB	15	Melvyn Jaminet
RW	14	Damian Penaud
OC	13	Pierre-Louis Barassi
IC	12	Arthur Vincent
LW	11	Teddy Thomas	(substituted off) 59'
FH	10	Antoine Hastoy	(substituted off) 67'
SH	9	Baptiste Couilloud
N8	8	Anthony Jelonch (c)	(substituted off) 5'	(substituted on) 17'
OF	7	Cameron Woki
BF	6	Dylan Cretin			(substituted off) 62'
RL	5	Romain Taofifénua	(substituted off) 63'
LL	4	Pierre-Henri Azagoh
TP	3	Sipili Falatea	(substituted off) 47'
HK	2	Gaëtan Barlot	(substituted off) 59'
LP	1	Enzo Forletta	(substituted off) 62'
Replacements:
HK	16	Anthony Étrillard	(substituted on) 59'
PR	17	Quentin Walcker	(substituted on) 62'
PR	18	Demba Bamba	(substituted on) 47'
FL	19	Baptiste Pesenti	(substituted on) 63'
FL	20	Alexandre Bécognée	(substituted on) 5'	(substituted off) 17'	(substituted on) 62'
SH	21	Teddy Iribaren
FB	22	Anthony Bouthier	(substituted on) 67'
CE	23	Julien Hériteau	(substituted on) 59'
Coach:
(France) Fabien Galthié

Assistant referees:
Mike Fraser (New Zealand)
Brendon Pickerill (New Zealand)
Television match official:
Glenn Newman (New Zealand)

Notes:

- Cyril Cazeaux (France) was named to start but withdrew ahead of the game and was replaced by Pierre-Henri Azagoh. Baptiste Pesenti replaced Azagoh on the bench.
- Alexandre Bécognée, Antoine Hastoy and Julien Hériteau (all France) made their international debuts.
- Australia retain the Trophée des Bicentenaires.
- Australia win a home test-series for the first time since France last toured to Australia in 2014.

== See also ==
- 2021 July rugby union tests
