= List of 2022–23 Top 14 transfers =

This is a list of player transfers involving Top 14 teams before or during the 2022–23 season. The list is of deals that are confirmed and are either from or to a rugby union team in the Top 14 during the 2021–22 season. It is not unknown for confirmed deals to be cancelled at a later date.

== Bayonne ==
=== Players In ===
- (France) Pierre Huguet from (France) Carcassonne
- (Georgia (country)) Mikheil Nariashvili from (France) Montpellier
- (France) Maxime Machenaud from (France) Racing 92
- (France) Thomas Acquier from (France) Brive
- (France) Bastien Pourailly from (France) Clermont
- (France) Thomas Ceyte from (France) Nevers
- (France) Camille Lopez from (France) Clermont
- (France) Quentin Bethune from (France) Stade Français
- (Uruguay) Manuel Leindekar from (France) Oyonnax
- (France) Pascal Cotet from (France) Narbonne
- (New Zealand) Jason Robertson from (France) Narbonne
- (Argentina) Facundo Bosch from (France) La Rochelle
- Kaminieli Rasaku from Fiji Sevens
- (Fiji) Eneriko Buliruarua from (France) La Rochelle
- (Tonga) Mateaki Kafatolu from (France) Castres
- (South Africa) Pieter Scholtz from (England) Wasps
- (New Zealand) Geoff Cridge from (Australia) NSW Waratahs
- (Samoa) Olajuwon Noah from (South Africa) Sharks
- (Argentina) Martín Bogado from (Argentina) Jaguares XV
- (Australia) Luke Morahan from (England) Bristol Bears
- (England) Marland Yarde from (England) Sale Sharks

=== Players Out ===
- (France) Ugo Boniface to (France) Bordeaux
- (Spain) Asier Usarraga to (France) Castres
- (France) Filimo Taofifenua to (France) Oyonnax
- (Romania) Jean Baptiste de Clercq to (France) Bourg-en-Bresse
- (France) Maxime Lafage to (France) Vannes
- (France) Theo Costosseque to (France) Vannes
- (France) Luc Mousset retired
- (Australia) John Ulugia retired
- (South Africa) Shaun Venter to (France) Montauban
- (France) Maxime Delonca to (France) Dax
- (Argentina) Mariano Galarza retired
- (France) Guillaume Douche to (France) Dax
- (Fiji) Joe Ravouvou to (France) Oyonnax
- (Georgia (country)) Ioane Iashaghashvili to (France) Valence Romans
- (Samoa) Mat Luamanu to (France) Dax
- (Georgia (country)) Luka Tchelidze to (France) Biarritz (season-long loan)
- (Argentina) Martín Bogado to (New Zealand) Highlanders
- (Samoa) Afa Amosa to (France) Agen

== Bordeaux ==
=== Players In ===
- (France) Ugo Boniface from (France) Bayonne
- (France) Antoine Miquel from (France) Toulouse
- (Australia) Zack Holmes from (France) Toulouse
- (France) Sipili Falatea from (France) Clermont
- (France) Tani Vili from (France) Clermont
- (Democratic Republic of the Congo) Madosh Tambwe from (South Africa) Bulls
- (Australia) Caleb Timu unattached
- (Italy) Renato Giammarioli from (England) Worcester Warriors
- (England) Tom Willis from (England) Wasps

=== Players Out ===
- (France) Louis Picamoles retired
- (Samoa) UJ Seuteni to (France) La Rochelle
- (New Zealand) Ben Lam to (France) Montpellier
- (Moldova) Vadim Cobîlaș retired
- (France) Alexandre Roumat to (France) Toulouse
- (France) François Trinh-Duc retired
- (France) Thierry Paiva to (France) La Rochelle
- (France) Julien Brosse to (France) Massy
- (France) Enzo Baggiani to (France) Vannes
- (New Zealand) Connor Sa to (France) Carcassonne (season-long loan)
- (South Africa) Joseph Dweba to (South Africa) Stormers
- (France) Cameron Woki to (France) Racing 92
- (France) Nathanaël Hulleu to (France) Vannes (season-long loan)
- (Georgia (country)) Lasha Tabidze to (France) Biarritz

== Brive ==
=== Players In ===
- (Ireland) Sammy Arnold from (Ireland) Connacht
- (France) Malino Vanai from (France) Agen
- (Argentina) Rodrigo Bruni from (France) Vannes
- (New Zealand) Abraham Papali'i from (Ireland) Connacht
- (France) Lucas Da Silva from (France) Stade Français
- (South Africa) Marcel van der Merwe from (England) London Irish
- (France) Julien Delannoy from (France) Pau
- (Fiji) Mesu Kunavula from (Scotland) Edinburgh
- (Samoa) Tietie Tuimauga from (New Zealand) Wellington
- (France) Arthur Bonneval from (France) Toulouse
- (Wales) Ross Moriarty from (Wales) Dragons

=== Players Out ===
- (Fiji) Peniami Narisia to (France) Racing 92
- (Fiji) Kitione Kamikamica to (France) Racing 92
- (France) Simon-Pierre Chauvac to (France) Montpellier
- (France) Thomas Acquier to (France) Bayonne
- (France) Victor Lebas to (France) Oyonnax
- (Georgia (country)) Soso Bekoshvili to (France) Carcassonne
- (South Africa) Cody Thomas to (France) Rouen
- (Fiji) Sevanaia Galala to (France) Montauban
- (Georgia (country)) Tedo Abzhandadze to (France) Montauban
- (New Zealand) Dylan Lam to (France) Massy
- (Georgia (country)) Otar Giorgadze to (France) Montauban
- (Samoa) So'otala Fa'aso'o to (England) London Irish
- (Portugal) Steevy Cerqueira to (France) Chambéry
- (France) Pierre Tournebidze to (France) Périgueux
- (France) Enzo Jouannet to (France) Floriac
- (Australia) Mitch Lees retired
- (France) Malino Vanai to (France) Montauban
- (England) Hayden Thompson-Stringer to (France) La Rochelle

== Castres ==
=== Players In ===
- (France) Aurelien Azar from (France) Carcassonne
- (France) Gauthier Maravat from (France) Agen
- (France) Adrien Seguret from (France) Grenoble
- (Spain) Asier Usarraga from (France) Bayonne
- (France) Gauthier Doubrere from (France) Mont-de-Marsan
- (Fiji) Leone Nakarawa from (France) Toulon
- (France) Julien Blanc from (France) Toulon

=== Players Out ===
- (France) Rory Kockott retired
- (France) Clement Clavieres to (France) Carcassonne
- (France) Pierre Aguillon to (France) Carcassonne
- (New Zealand) Jack Whetton to (France) Colomiers
- (France) Stephane Onambele to (France) Carcassonne
- (France) Bastien Guillemin to (France) Montauban
- (Germany) Julius Nostadt to (France) Provence
- (Tonga) Mateaki Kafatolu to (France) Bayonne
- (France) Hugo Hermet to (France) Oyonnax
- (France) Loïc Jacquet retired

== Clermont ==
=== Players In ===
- (France) Anthony Belleau from (France) Toulon
- (France) Jules Plisson from (France) La Rochelle
- (France) Loic Godener from (France) Stade Français
- (Australia) Irae Simone from (Australia) Brumbies
- (Argentina) Bautista Delguy from (France) Perpignan
- (France) Julien Hériteau from (France) Toulon
- (Australia) Alex Newsome from (Australia) NSW Waratahs
- (Georgia (country)) Davit Kubriashvili from (France) Perpignan

=== Players Out ===
- (France) Morgan Parra to (France) Stade Français
- (France) Sipili Falatea to (France) Bordeaux
- (France) Tani Vili to (France) Bordeaux
- (France) Bastien Pourailly to (France) Bayonne
- (France) Camille Lopez to (France) Bayonne
- (Ireland) JJ Hanrahan to (Wales) Dragons
- (France) Henzo Kiteau to (France) Aurillac (season-long loan)
- (Argentina) Juan Martin Scelzo to (France) Stade Français
- (France) Clément Lanen to (France) Massy
- (Japan) Kotaro Matsushima to (Japan) Tokyo Sungoliath
- (France) Wesley Fofana retired
- (France) Alexandre Lapandry retired

== La Rochelle ==
=== Players In ===
- (France) Antoine Hastoy from (France) Pau
- (France) Quentin Lespiaucq from (France) Pau
- (Samoa) UJ Seuteni from (France) Bordeaux
- (France) Thierry Paiva from (France) Bordeaux
- (France) Teddy Thomas from (France) Racing 92
- (France) Georges-Henri Colombe from (France) Racing 92
- (France) Yoan Tanga from (France) Racing 92
- (Ireland) Ultan Dillane from (Ireland) Connacht
- (South Africa) Kyle Hatherell from (England) Worcester Warriors
- (England) Hayden Thompson-Stringer from (France) Brive

=== Players Out ===
- (New Zealand) Ihaia West to (France) Toulon
- (France) Jules Plisson to (France) Clermont
- (France) Arthur Retière to (France) Toulouse
- (France) Mathieu Tanguy to (France) Toulon
- (South Africa) Wiaan Liebenberg retired
- (France) Dany Priso to (France) Toulon
- (New Zealand) Victor Vito retired
- (France) Jérémy Sinzelle to (France) Toulon
- (Georgia (country)) Guram Papidze to (France) Pau
- (Argentina) Facundo Bosch to (France) Bayonne
- (Fiji) Kavekini Tabu to (France) Bourg-en-Bresse
- (Fiji) Eneriko Buliruarua to (France) Bayonne
- (Germany) Michel Himmer to (France) Soyaux Angoulême
- (Argentina) Ramiro Herrera to (Argentina) Hindú

== Lyon ==
=== Players In ===
- (France) Paulo Tafili from (France) Toulouse
- (New Zealand) Josiah Maraku from (France) Narbonne
- (France) Maxime Gouzou from (France) Mont-de-Marsan
- (New Zealand) Liam Coltman from (New Zealand) Highlanders
- (Australia) Kyle Godwin from (Australia) Western Force
- (South Africa) Arno Botha from (South Africa) Bulls
- (New Zealand) Fletcher Smith from (Japan) Green Rockets Tokatsu
- (Australia) Feao Fotuaika from (Australia) Queensland Reds

=== Players Out ===
- (France) Mickaël Ivaldi to (France) Stade Français
- (France) Pierre-Louis Barassi to (France) Toulouse
- (France) Clement Laporte to (France) Pau
- (New Zealand) Charlie Ngatai to (Ireland) Leinster
- (Australia) Colby Fainga'a to (Japan) Kyuden Voltex
- (France) Mathieu Bastareaud to (France) Toulon

== Montpellier ==
=== Players In ===
- (New Zealand) Ben Lam from (France) Bordeaux
- (France) Simon-Pierre Chauvac from (France) Brive
- (France) Léo Coly from (France) Mont-de-Marsan
- (France) Louis Carbonel from (France) Toulon
- (France) Clement Doumenc from (France) Carcassonne
- (New Zealand) Karl Tu'inukuafe from (New Zealand) Blues
- (Italy) Giovanni Sante from (Italy) Mogliano
- (Australia) Alex Masibaka from (Australia) Western Force
- (New Zealand) George Bridge from (New Zealand) Crusaders
- (England) Curtis Langdon from (England) Worcester Warriors

=== Players Out ===
- (France) Guilhem Guirado retired
- (South Africa) Handré Pollard to (England) Leicester Tigers
- (Georgia (country)) Mikheil Nariashvili to (France) Bayonne
- (France) Fulgence Ouedraogo retired
- (South Africa) Robert Rodgers to (France) Aurillac (season-long loan)
- (France) Benoît Paillaugue to (France) Toulon
- (France) Malik Hamadache to (France) Agen
- (France) Kélian Galletier to (France) Perpignan
- (France) Yannick Arroyo to (France) Béziers (season-long loan)
- (France) Martin Doan to (France) Mont-de-Marsan
- (France) Mickaël Capelli to (France) Pau
- (France) Yvan Reilhac to (France) Pau (season-long loan)

== Pau ==
=== Players In ===
- (France) Sacha Zegueur from (France) Oyonnax
- (France) Emilien Gailleton from (France) Agen
- (France) Clement Laporte from (France) Lyon
- (Georgia (country)) Guram Papidze from (France) La Rochelle
- (France) Romain Ruffenach from (France) Biarritz
- (France) Mickaël Capelli from (France) Montpellier
- (France) Yvan Reilhac from (France) Montpellier (season-long loan)
- (England) Dan Robson from (England) Wasps
- (Argentina) Santiago Grondona from (England) Exeter Chiefs

=== Players Out ===
- (Samoa) Giovanni Habel-Kuffner to (France) Stade Français
- (France) Antoine Hastoy to (France) La Rochelle
- (France) Quentin Lespiaucq to (France) La Rochelle
- (New Zealand) Daniel Ramsay retired
- (France) Kevin Yameogo to (France) Montauban (season-long loan)
- (Italy) Marco Zanon to (Italy) Benetton
- (France) Julien Delannoy to (France) Brive
- (France) Louis Barrere to (France) Dax
- (France) Rayne Barka to (France) Soyaux Angoulême (season-long loan)

== Perpignan ==
=== Players In ===
- (Australia) Jake McIntyre from (Australia) Western Force
- (France) Victor Moreaux from (France) Racing 92
- (France) Kélian Galletier from (France) Montpellier
- (France) Boris Goutard from (France) Narbonne
- (Tonga) Maʻafu Fia from (Wales) Ospreys
- (France) Dorian Laborde from (France) Toulon
- (England) Will Witty from (England) Exeter Chiefs
- (England) Brad Shields from (England) Wasps
- (England) Ali Crossdale from (England) Wasps

=== Players Out ===
- (France) Melvyn Jaminet to (France) Toulouse
- (France) Jean-Bernard Pujol to (France) Montauban
- (France) Julien Farnoux to (France) Grenoble
- (France) Damien Chouly retired
- (Argentina) Bautista Delguy to (France) Clermont
- (France) Dylan Jaminet to (France) Nevers
- (United States) Nafi Ma'afu to (France) Biarritz
- (France) Killian Taofifenua to (France) Biarritz
- (Fiji) Tevita Cavubati retired
- (France) Sami Mavinga to (France) Carcassonne
- (Samoa) Henry Tuilagi to (France) Cognac Saint-Jean-d'Angély
- (France) Guillem Montagne to (France) Narbonne
- (Georgia (country)) Davit Kubriashvili to (France) Clermont
- (Australia) Brayden Wiliame to New Zealand Warriors

== Racing 92 ==
=== Players In ===
- (France) Janick Tarrit from (France) Nevers
- (Fiji) Peniami Narisia from (France) Brive
- (Fiji) Kitione Kamikamica from (France) Brive
- (Fiji) Asaeli Tuivuaka from (Italy) Zebre Parma
- (South Africa) Warrick Gelant from (South Africa) Stormers
- (Tonga) Veikoso Poloniati from (New Zealand) Moana Pasifika
- (France) Cameron Woki from (France) Bordeaux
- (Wales) Regan Grace from (England) St Helens
- (England) Christian Wade unattached
- (New Zealand) Francis Saili from (France) Biarritz
- (England) Biyi Alo from (England) Wasps
- (Fiji) Vinaya Habosi from (Fiji) Fijian Drua

=== Players Out ===
- (France) Georges-Henri Colombe to (France) La Rochelle
- (France) Teddy Thomas to (France) La Rochelle
- (France) Yoan Tanga to (France) La Rochelle
- (France) Teddy Baubigny to (France) Toulon
- (France) Maxime Machenaud to (France) Bayonne
- (France) Victor Moreaux to (France) Perpignan
- (France) Jean Chezeau to (France) Vannes (season-long loan)
- (France) Kevin Le Guen to (France) Soyaux Angoulême
- (France) Luka Begic to (France) Chambéry
- (Australia) Mitch Short to (France) Béziers
- (France) Baptiste Pesenti to (France) Stade Français
- (Australia) Luke Jones to (Australia) Queensland Reds
- (France) Virimi Vakatawa retired

== Stade Français ==
=== Players In ===
- (Samoa) Giovanni Habel-Kuffner from (France) Pau
- (France) Morgan Parra from (France) Clermont
- (France) Mickaël Ivaldi from (France) Lyon
- (France) Stephane Ahmed from (France) Montauban
- (France) Mathieu Hirigoyen from (France) Biarritz
- (France) Lucas Peyresblanques from (France) Biarritz
- (Georgia (country)) Giorgi Tsutskiridze from (France) Aurillac
- (France) Hugo N'Diaye from (France) Rouen
- (France) Julien Ory from (France) Toulon
- (Argentina) Juan Martin Scelzo from (France) Clermont
- (France) Baptiste Pesenti from (France) Racing 92
- (France) Theo Dachary from (France) Toulon
- (France) Louis Druart from (France) Montauban
- (Algeria) Nadir Megdoud from (France) Rouen
- (South Africa) Jeremy Ward from (South Africa) Sharks
- Peniasi Dakuwaqa from Fiji Sevens
- (South Africa) Vincent Koch from (England) Wasps
- (England) Paolo Odogwu from (England) Wasps
- (Australia) Sitaleki Timani from (France) Toulon

=== Players Out ===
- (Fiji) Waisea Nayacalevu to (France) Toulon
- (France) Charlie Francoz to (France) Biarritz
- (France) Quentin Bethune to (France) Bayonne
- (France) Lucas Da Silva to (France) Brive
- (Australia) Tala Gray to (France) Grenoble
- (France) Loic Godener to (France) Clermont
- (France) Adrien Lapegue to (France) Provence
- (Canada) William Percillier to (France) Vannes (season-long loan)
- (France) Antoine Burban retired
- (France) Adrien Lapegue to (France) Provence
- (Australia) Tolu Latu to (Australia) NSW Waratahs
- (France) Yoann Maestri to (Japan) Toyota Industries Shuttles Aichi
- (New Zealand) Ngani Laumape to (Japan) Kobelco Kobe Steelers

== Toulon ==
=== Players In ===
- (New Zealand) Ihaia West from (France) La Rochelle
- (France) Teddy Baubigny from (France) Racing 92
- (Fiji) Waisea Nayacalevu from (France) Stade Français
- (France) Mathieu Tanguy from (France) La Rochelle
- (France) Dany Priso from (France) La Rochelle
- (France) Maёlan Rabut from (France) Vannes
- (France) Jérémy Sinzelle from (France) La Rochelle
- (France) Benoît Paillaugue from (France) Montpellier
- (Australia) Sitaleki Timani unattached
- (France) Mathieu Bastareaud from (France) Lyon
- (Wales) Dan Biggar from (England) Northampton Saints

=== Players Out ===
- (France) Anthony Belleau to (France) Clermont
- (France) Louis Carbonel to (France) Montpellier
- (Tonga) Sonatane Takulua to (France) Agen
- (South Africa) Eben Etzebeth to (South Africa) Sharks
- (Tonga) Lopeti Timani to (Wales) Cardiff
- (United States) Mike Sosene-Feagai to (France) Agen
- (France) Julien Ory to (France) Stade Français
- (France) Julien Hériteau to (France) Clermont
- (Fiji) Petero Tuwai to (France) Suresnes
- (France) Fabio Gonzalez to (France) Chambéry (season-long loan)
- (France) Theo Dachary to (France) Stade Français
- (France) Dorian Laborde to (France) Perpignan
- (Fiji) Leone Nakarawa to (France) Castres
- (England) Harrison Obatoyinbo to (France) Mont-de-Marsan
- (Ireland) Quinn Roux to (England) Bath
- (France) Julien Blanc to (France) Castres
- (Australia) Sitaleki Timani to (France) Stade Français

== Toulouse ==
=== Players In ===
- (France) Alexandre Roumat from (France) Bordeaux
- (France) Arthur Retière from (France) La Rochelle
- (France) Melvyn Jaminet from (France) Perpignan
- (France) Pierre-Louis Barassi from (France) Lyon
- (France) Paul Graou from (France) Agen
- (Italy) Ange Capuozzo from (France) Grenoble
- (England) Jack Willis from (England) Wasps

=== Players Out ===
- (France) Antoine Miquel to (France) Bordeaux
- (Australia) Zack Holmes to (France) Bordeaux
- (Samoa) Joe Tekori retired
- (France) Paulo Tafili to (France) Lyon
- (France) Maxime Medard retired
- (France) Romain Riguet to (France) Montauban (season-long loan)
- (France) Paul Arnaud Ausset to (France) Dax
- (France) Baptiste Germain to (France) Biarritz (season-long loan)
- (France) Alexi Balès retired
- (France) Arthur Bonneval to (France) Brive

== See also ==
- List of 2022–23 Premiership Rugby transfers
- List of 2022–23 United Rugby Championship transfers
- List of 2022–23 Super Rugby transfers
- List of 2022–23 RFU Championship transfers
- List of 2022–23 Rugby Pro D2 transfers
- List of 2022–23 Major League Rugby transfers
