= 2021–22 Top 14 season =

French rugby union season

2021–22 Top 14
- Countries: France
- Date: 4 September 2021 - 5 June 2022
- Champions: Montpellier (1st title)
- Runners-up: Castres
- Relegated: Biarritz
- Matches played: 182
- Tries scored: 831 (average 4.6 per match)
- Top point scorer: (France) Léo Berdeu (251 points)
- Top try scorer: (France) Baptiste Couilloud (11 tries)

Official website
- www.lnr.fr/rugby-top-14

The 2021–22 Top 14 competition was the 123rd French domestic rugby union club competition operated by the Ligue Nationale de Rugby (LNR).

== Teams ==
Locations of the 2021–22 Top 14 teams

Club	City (department)	Stadium	Capacity	Previous season
Biarritz	Biarritz (Pyrénées-Atlantiques)	Parc des Sports Aguiléra	15,000	Promoted from Pro D2 (play-off accession and 3rd in league)
Bordeaux Bègles	Bordeaux (Gironde)	Stade Chaban-Delmas (Note: In recent years, Bordeaux Bègles has taken occasional home matches to Matmut Atlantique.)	33,500	Semi-finals (4th in league)
Brive	Brive-la-Gaillarde (Corrèze)	Stade Amédée-Domenech	13,979	11th
Castres	Castres (Tarn)	Stade Pierre-Fabre	12,500	7th
Clermont	Clermont-Ferrand (Puy-de-Dôme)	Stade Marcel-Michelin	19,022	Quarter-finals (5th in league)
La Rochelle	La Rochelle (Charente-Maritime)	Stade Marcel-Deflandre	16,000	2nd
Lyon	Lyon (Métropole de Lyon)	Matmut Stadium de Gerland	25,000	9th
Montpellier	Montpellier (Hérault)	Altrad Stadium	15,697	10th
Pau	Pau (Pyrénées-Atlantiques)	Stade du Hameau	18,324	12th
Perpignan	Perpignan (Pyrénées-Orientales)	Stade Aimé Giral	14,593	Promoted from Pro D2 (champions and 1st in league)
Racing	Nanterre (Hauts-de-Seine)	Paris La Défense Arena	30,681	Semi-finals (3rd in league)
Stade Français	Paris, 16th arrondissement	Stade Jean-Bouin	20,000	Quarter-finals (6th in league)
Toulon	Toulon (Var)	Stade Mayol (Note: In recent years, Toulon has taken occasional home matches to Stade Vélodrome in Marseille and Allianz Riviera in Nice.)	18,200	8th
Toulouse	Toulouse (Haute-Garonne)	Stade Ernest-Wallon (Note: Toulouse often takes high-demand home matches to the city's largest sporting venue, Stadium de Toulouse.)	18,784	1st

== Number of teams by region ==
Teams	Region or country	Team(s)
5	Nouvelle-Aquitaine	Biarritz, Bordeaux Bègles, Brive, La Rochelle, Pau
4	Occitanie	Castres, Montpellier, Perpignan, Toulouse
2	Auvergne-Rhône-Alpes	Clermont, Lyon
2	Île-de-France	Racing, Stade Français
1	Provence-Alpes-Côte d'Azur	Toulon

== Competition format ==
The top six teams at the end of the regular season (after all the teams played one another twice, once at home, once away) enter a knockout stage to decide the Champions of France. This consists of three rounds: the teams finishing third to sixth in the table play quarter-finals (hosted by the third and fourth placed teams). The winners then face the top two teams in the semi-finals, with the winners meeting in the final at the Stade de France in Saint-Denis.

The LNR uses a slightly different bonus points system from that used in most other rugby competitions. It trialled a new system in 2007–08 explicitly designed to prevent a losing team from earning more than one bonus point in a match, a system that also made it impossible for either team to earn a bonus point in a drawn match. LNR chose to continue with this system for subsequent seasons.

France's bonus point system operates as follows:

- 4 points for a win.
- 2 points for a draw.
- 1 bonus point for scoring at least 3 more tries than the opponent. This replaces the standard bonus point for scoring 4 tries regardless of the opponent scoring.
- 1 bonus point for losing by 5 points (or fewer). The margin had been 7 points until being changed prior to the 2014–15 season.

== Table ==
2021–22 Top 14 table
Pos	Team	Pld	W	D	L	PF	PA	PD	TB	LB	Pts	Qualification
1	Castres (F)	26	17	1	8	565	529	+36	5	1	76	Semi-final play-off places and qualified for the Champions Cup
2	Montpellier (C)	26	15	2	9	619	503	+116	4	6	74	Semi-final play-off places and qualified for the Champions Cup
3	Bordeaux Bègles (SF)	26	15	1	10	610	484	+126	5	5	72	Quarter-final play-off places and qualified for the Champions Cup
4	Toulouse (SF)	26	15	0	11	638	432	+206	6	5	71	Quarter-final play-off places and qualified for the Champions Cup
5	La Rochelle (QF)	26	15	0	11	640	466	+174	6	5	71	Quarter-final play-off places and qualified for the Champions Cup
6	Racing (QF)	26	16	0	10	661	568	+93	4	2	70	Quarter-final play-off places and qualified for the Champions Cup
7	Clermont	26	14	0	12	649	557	+92	6	4	66	Qualified for the Champions Cup
8	Toulon	26	13	2	11	572	504	+68	4	5	65	
9	Lyon (Note: Lyon received a berth for winning the 2021–22 European Rugby Challenge Cup)	26	13	0	13	637	558	+79	6	6	64	Qualified for the Champions Cup
10	Pau	26	11	1	14	568	664	−96	1	3	50	
11	Stade Français	26	11	0	15	544	651	−107	2	4	50	
12	Brive	26	9	1	16	453	631	−178	4	4	46	
13	Perpignan	26	9	0	17	491	664	−173	2	5	43	Relegation play-off (Note: Contest a play-off with the runners-up of the 2020–21 Rugby Pro D2 season for a place in the 2022–23 Top 14 season)
14	Biarritz (R)	26	5	0	21	449	885	−436	1	3	24	Relegated to Rugby Pro D2

Source: Top 14
Rules for classification: If teams are level at any stage, tiebreakers are applied in the following order:
1. Competition points earned in head-to-head matches
2. Points difference in head-to-head matches
3. Try differential in head-to-head matches
4. Points difference in all matches
5. Try differential in all matches
6. Points scored in all matches
7. Tries scored in all matches
8. Fewer matches forfeited
9. Classification in the previous Top 14 season
  Notes:

== Relegation ==
From the 2017–18 season, only the 14th placed team is automatically relegated to the Pro D2. The 13th placed team play the runner-up of the Pro D2 play-off, with the winner taking up the final place in the Top 14 for the following season.

== Fixtures and results ==
=== Round 1 ===
4 September 2021
14:00

Biarritz	27–15	Bordeaux Bègles
	Report

Parc des Sports Aguiléra
Referee: Mathieu Raynal

4 September 2021
14:05

(1 BP) Brive	36–15	Perpignan
	Report

Stade Amédée-Domenech
Referee: Adrien Marbot

4 September 2021
14:05

Castres	16–12	Pau (1 BP)
	Report

Stade Pierre-Fabre
Referee: Pierre Brousset

4 September 2021
18:15

Stade Français	21–36	Racing
	Report

Stade Jean-Bouin
Referee: Romain Poite

4 September 2021
21:05

Toulon	24–24	Montpellier
	Report

Stade Mayol
Referee: Adrien Descottes

5 September 2021
17:45

Lyon	28–19	Clermont
	Report

Matmut Stadium de Gerland
Referee: Ludovic Cayre

5 September 2021
21:05

(1 BP) La Rochelle	16–20	Toulouse
	Report

Stade Marcel-Deflandre
Referee: Jonathan Dufort

=== Round 2 ===
11 September 2021
15:00

Montpellier	37–19	Brive
	Report

Altrad Stadium
Referee: Benoit Rousselet

11 September 2021
15:00

Perpignan	33–20	Biarritz
	Report

Stade Aimé Giral
Referee: Laurent Cardona

11 September 2021
15:00

(1 BP) Clermont	30–34	Castres
	Report

Stade Marcel-Michelin
Referee: Cedric Marchat

11 September 2021
15:00

Pau	21–17	Lyon (1 BP)
	Report

Stade du Hameau
Referee: Vincent Blasco Basque

11 September 2021
15:15

(1 BP) Bordeaux Bègles	37–10	Stade Français
	Report

Stade Chaban-Delmas
Referee: Maxime Chalon

11 September 2021
21:05

Racing	23–10	La Rochelle
	Report

Paris La Défense Arena
Referee: Tual Trainini

12 September 2021
21:05

(1 BP) Toulouse	41–10	Toulon
	Report

Stade Ernest-Wallon
Referee: Luc Ramos

=== Round 3 ===
18 September 2021
15:00

(1 BP) Brive	30–13	Pau
	Report

Stade Amédée-Domenech
Referee: Vivien Praderie

18 September 2021
15:00

Biarritz	28–19	Racing
	Report

Parc des Sports Aguiléra
Referee: Jonathan Gasnier

18 September 2021
15:00

Castres	23–23	Bordeaux Bègles
	Report

Stade Pierre-Fabre
Referee: Romain Poite

18 September 2021
15:00

(1 BP) Lyon	47–3	Perpignan
	Report

Matmut Stadium de Gerland
Referee: Sebastien Minery

18 September 2021
17:00

(1 BP) Montpellier	15–17	Toulouse
	Report

Altrad Stadium
Referee: Ludovic Cayre

18 September 2021
21:05

Clermont	23–22	La Rochelle (1 BP)
	Report

Stade Marcel-Michelin
Referee: Pierre Brousset

19 September 2021
19:05

(1 BP) Toulon	38–5	Stade Français
	Report

Stade Mayol
Referee: Mathieu Raynal

=== Round 4 ===
25 September 2021
15:00

Stade Français	34–10	Castres
	Report

Stade Jean-Bouin
Referee: Luc Ramos

25 September 2021
15:00

Pau	23–22	Montpellier (1 BP)
	Report

Stade du Hameau
Referee: Pierre Baptiste Nuchy

25 September 2021
15:00

Bordeaux Bègles	29–10	Brive
	Report

Stade Chaban-Delmas
Referee: Cedric Marchat

25 September 2021
15:00

(1 BP) La Rochelle	59–17	Biarritz
	Report

Stade Marcel-Deflandre
Referee: Vincent Blasco Basque

25 September 2021
17:00

Racing	24–20	Lyon (1 BP)
	Report

Paris La Défense Arena
Referee: Adrien Descottes

25 September 2021
21:00

Perpignan	12–9	Toulon (1 BP)
	Report

Stade Aimé Giral
Referee: Pierre Brousset

26 September 2021
21:05

Toulouse	27–15	Clermont
	Report

Stade Ernest-Wallon
Referee: Maxime Chalon

=== Round 5 ===
2 October 2021
15:00

Brive	19–12	Stade Français
	Report

Stade Amédée-Domenech
Referee: Ludovic Cayre

2 October 2021
15:00

Montpellier	21–11	La Rochelle
	Report

Altrad Stadium
Referee: Mathieu Raynal

2 October 2021
15:00

Perpignan	14–29	Pau
	Report

Stade Aimé Giral
Referee: Romain Poite

2 October 2021
15:00

(1 BP) Lyon	15–20	Bordeaux Bègles
	Report

Matmut Stadium de Gerland
Referee: Vivien Praderie

2 October 2021
17:00

Biarritz	11–17	Toulouse
	Report

Parc des Sports Aguiléra
Referee: Pierre Baptiste Nuchy

2 October 2021
21:05

Castres	27–16	Toulon
	Report

Stade Pierre-Fabre
Referee: Adrien Descottes

3 October 2021
21:05

Clermont	26–17	Racing
	Report

Stade Marcel-Michelin
Referee: Laurent Cardona

=== Round 6 ===
9 October 2021
15:00

Biarritz	5–40	Lyon (1 BP)
	Report

Parc des Sports Aguiléra
Referee: Cedric Marchat

9 October 2021
15:00

Bordeaux Bègles	27–23	Montpellier (1 BP)
	Report

Stade Chaban-Delmas
Referee: Pierre Brousset

9 October 2021
15:00

La Rochelle	29–10	Castres
	Report

Stade Marcel-Deflandre
Referee: Ludovic Cayre

9 October 2021
15:00

Racing	17–14	Perpignan (1 BP)
	Report

Paris La Défense Arena
Referee: Pierre Baptiste Nuchy

9 October 2021
17:00

(1 BP) Toulouse	38–10	Pau
	Report

Stade Ernest-Wallon
Referee: Adrien Marbot

9 October 2021
21:05

Toulon	13–9	Brive (1 BP)
	Report

Stade Mayol
Referee: Jonathan Dufort

10 October 2021
21:05

Stade Français	22–14	Clermont
	Report

Stade Jean-Bouin
Referee: Romain Poite

=== Round 7 ===
16 October 2021
15:00

(1 BP) Perpignan	22–23	Stade Français
	Report

Stade Aimé Giral
Referee: Laurent Cordona

16 October 2021
15:00

(1 BP) Pau	33–37	Bordeaux Bègles
	Report

Stade du Hameau
Referee: Mathieu Raynal

16 October 2021
15:00

(1 BP) Castres	38–20	Biarritz
	Report

Stade Pierre-Fabre
Referee: Maxime Chalon

16 October 2021
15:00

(1 BP) Brive	6–8	La Rochelle
	Report

Stade Amédée-Domenech
Referee: Romain Poite

16 October 2021
17:00

(1 BP) Montpellier	20–22	Clermont
	Report

Altrad Stadium
Referee: Sebastien Minery

16 October 2021
21:05

Toulon	20–27	Racing
	Report

Stade Mayol
Referee: Vincent Blasco Basque

17 October 2021
21:05

Lyon	25–19	Toulouse
	Report

Matmut Stadium de Gerland
Referee: Luc Ramos

=== Round 8 ===
23 October 2021
15:00

(1 BP) Bordeaux Bègles	39–13	Perpignan
	Report

Stade Chaban-Delmas
Referee: Benoit Rousselet

23 October 2021
15:00

Stade Français	23–18	Lyon (1 BP)
	Report

Stade Jean-Bouin
Referee: Jonathan Dufort

23 October 2021
15:00

(1 BP) Biarritz	37–9	Brive
	Report

Parc des Sports Aguiléra
Referee: Luc Ramos

23 October 2021
15:00

(1 BP) Clermont	42–20	Pau
	Report

Stade Marcel-Michelin
Referee: Ludovic Cayre

23 October 2021
17:00

Racing	21–32	Montpellier
	Report

Paris La Défense Arena
Referee: Vivien Praderie

23 October 2021
21:00

(1 BP) Toulouse	41–0	Castres
	Report

Stade Ernest-Wallon
Referee: Mathieu Raynal

24 October 2021
21:05

(1 BP) La Rochelle	39–6	Toulon
	Report

Stade Marcel-Deflandre
Referee: Pierre Brousset

=== Round 9 ===
30 October 2021
15:00

Toulon	13–9	Biarritz (1 BP)
	Report

Stade Mayol
Referee: Laurent Cardona

30 October 2021
15:00

Castres	23–22	Brive (1 BP)
	Report

Stade Pierre-Fabre
Referee: Adrien Marbot

30 October 2021
15:00

Pau	18–9	Stade Français
	Report

Stade de Hameau
Referee: Maxime Chalon

30 October 2021
15:00

Perpignan	22–13	La Rochelle
	Report

Stade Aimé Giral
Referee: Vincent Blasco Basque

30 October 2021
17:00

Montpellier	30–8	Lyon
	Report

Altrad Stadium
Referee: Romain Poite

30 October 2021
21:00

(1 BP) Bordeaux Bègles	25–9	Clermont
	Report

Stade Chaban-Delmas
Referee: Jonathan Dufort

31 October 2021
21:05

Racing	27–19	Toulouse
	Report

Paris La Défense Arena
Referee: Ludovic Cayre

=== Round 10 ===
5 November 2021
21:00

La Rochelle	26–3	Bordeaux Bègles
	Report

Stade Marcel-Deflandre
Referee: Adrien Descottes

6 November 2021
14:45

Lyon	30–23	Castres
	Report

Matmut Stadium de Gerland
Referee: Sebastien Minery

6 November 2021
14:45

Pau	33–21	Biarritz
	Report

Stade du Hameau
Referee: Mathieu Raynal

6 November 2021
14:45

(1 BP) Stade Français	27–31	Montpellier
	Report

Stade Jean-Bouin
Referee: Pierre Baptiste Nuchy

6 November 2021
14:45

(1 BP) Toulouse	37–15	Perpignan
	Report

Stade Ernest-Wallon
Referee: Maxime Chalon

6 November 2021
17:00

Brive	12–10	Racing (1 BP)
	Report

Stade Amédée-Domenech
Referee: Cedric Marchat

7 November 2021
21:05

Clermont	31–16	Toulon
	Report

Stade Marcel-Michelin
Referee: Vivien Praderie

== Relegation playoff ==
The team finishing in 13th place faces the runner-up of the Pro D2, with the winner of this match playing in the 2022–23 Top 14 and the loser in the 2022–23 Pro D2.

12 June 2022
17:45

Mont-de-Marsan	16–41	Perpignan
Try: Laousse Azpiazu 4' c Con: Coly (1/1) 4'; Pen: Coly (3/3) 11', 31', 40+2'	Report	Try: Jaminet 18' c de la Fuente 56' c Dubois 68' c Tedder 75' m Con: Jaminet (3/4) 18', 56', 68'; Pen: Jaminet (5/5) 8', 22', 36', 51', 54'

Stade Guy Boniface, Mont-de-Marsan
Referee: Thomas Charabas

Perpignan won and therefore both clubs remained in their respective leagues.

== Playoffs ==
Semi-final Qualifiers
4	Toulouse	33
5	La Rochelle	28
3	Bordeaux Bègles	36
6	Racing 92	16

Semi-finals
1	Castres	24
4	Toulouse	18
2	Montpellier	19
3	Bordeaux Bègles	10

Final
1	Castres	10
2	Montpellier	29

=== Semi-final Qualifiers ===
11 June 2022
21:05

Toulouse (4)	33–28	La Rochelle (5)
Try: Fouyssac 9' c Dupont 13' m Mallía 62' m Ntamack 69' c Con: Ramos (2/4) 8', 70'; Pen: Ramos (3/3) 18', 29', 36'	Report	Try: Liebenberg 25' c Alldritt 56' c Bourgarit 79' c Favre 80' c Con: West (4/4) 26', 57', 80', 80+1'

Stade Ernest-Wallon, Toulouse
Attendance: 18,784
Referee: Romain Poite

12 June 2022
21:05

Bordeaux Bègles (3)	36–16	Racing 92 (6)
Try: Cordero (2) 20' m, 54' c Seuteni 47' c Woki 58' c Lam 80' c Con: Lucu (3/4) 48', 55', 60'; Trinh-Duc (1/1) 80+1'; Pen: Lucu (1/2) 5'	Report	Try: Spring 39' c Con: Le Garrec (1/1) 40'; Pen: Le Garrec (2/3) 7', 43'; Machenaud (1/1) 57'

Stade Chaban-Delmas, Bordeaux
Attendance: 27,279
Referee: Mathieu Raynal

=== Semi-finals ===
17 June 2022
21:05

Castres (1)	24–18	Toulouse (4)
Try: Arata 43' c Dumora 77' m Con: Urdapilleta (1/2) 44'; Pen: Urdapilleta (4/4) 21', 27', 40+1', 70'	Report	Try: Lebel 2' c Ntamack 47' m Con: Ramos (1/2) 3'; Pen: Ramos (2/4) 17', 60'

Allianz Riviera, Nice
Attendance: 35,114
Referee: Ludovic Cayre

18 June 2022
21:05

Montpellier (2)	19–10	Bordeaux Bègles (3)
Try: Rattez 6' c Con: Paillaugue (1/1) 7'; Pen: Aprasidze (2/2) 70', 79'; Drop: Garbisi (1/1) 13'; Bouthier (1/1) 40'	Report	Try: Jalibert 16' c Con: Lucu (1/1) 17'; Pen: Lucu (1/1) 6'

Allianz Riviera, Nice
Attendance: 34,844
Referee: Pierre Brousset

=== Final ===
24 June 2022
20:45

Castres (1)	10–29	Montpellier (2)
Try: Botitu 75' c Con: Dumora (1/1) 75'; Pen: Dumora (1/2) 34'	Report	Try: Vincent 6' m Verhaeghe 10' c Bouthier 12' m Con: Paillaugue (1/3) 10'; Pen: Paillaugue (2/2) 21', 39'; Garbisi (1/1) 68'; Pollard (1/1) 77'

Stade de France, Saint-Denis
Attendance: 78,245
Referee: Tual Trainini

FB	15	(France) Julien Dumora
RW	14	(France) Geoffrey Palis
OC	13	(France) Thomas Combezou
IC	12	(Fiji) Vilimoni Botitu
LW	11	(Fiji) Filipo Nakosi
FH	10	(Argentina) Benjamín Urdapilleta
SH	9	(Uruguay) Santiago Arata
N8	8	(New Zealand) Teariki Ben-Nicholas
OF	7	(Australia) Nick Champion de Crespigny
BF	6	(France) Mathieu Babillot (c)
RL	5	(Australia) Tom Staniforth
LL	4	(France) Florent Vanverberghe
TP	3	(France) Wilfrid Hounkpatin
HK	2	(France) Gaëtan Barlot
LP	1	(France) Quentin Walcker
Substitutions:
HK	16	(Tonga) Paul Ngauamo
PR	17	(France) Wayan De Bendittis
LK	18	(France) Loïc Jacquet
BR	19	(France) Baptiste Delaporte
SH	20	(France) Jérémy Fernandez
CE	21	(Fiji) Adrea Cocagi
CE	22	(France) Antoine Zeghdar
PR	23	(Georgia (country)) Levan Chilachava
Coach:
(France) Pierre-Henry Broncan

FB	15	(France) Anthony Bouthier
RW	14	(France) Arthur Vincent
OC	13	(France) Geoffrey Doumayrou
IC	12	(South Africa) Jan Serfontein
LW	11	(France) Vincent Rattez
FH	10	(Italy) Paolo Garbisi
SH	9	(France) Benoît Paillaugue
N8	8	(England) Zach Mercer
OF	7	(France) Yacouba Camara (c)
BF	6	(France) Alexandre Bécognée
RL	5	(France) Bastien Chalureau
LL	4	(France) Florian Verhaeghe
TP	3	(France) Mohamed Haouas
HK	2	(France) Guilhem Guirado
LP	1	(United States) Titi Lamositele
Substitutions:
HK	16	(Australia) Brandon Paenga-Amosa
PR	17	(South Africa) Robert Rodgers
LK	18	(France) Mickaël Capelli
LK	19	(South Africa) Nico Janse van Rensburg
SH	20	(Georgia (country)) Gela Aprasidze
WG	21	(France) Gabriel N'Gandebe
FH	22	(South Africa) Handré Pollard
PR	23	(England) Henry Thomas
Coach:
(France) Philippe Saint-André

== See also ==
- 2021–22 Rugby Pro D2 season
