= Pierre-Henri Azagoh =

France international rugby union player

- Born: 25 July 1998 (age 28) Nîmes, France
- Height: 1.96 m (6 ft 5 in)
- Weight: 103 kg (227 lb)

Rugby union career
- Position: Lock
Senior career
Years	Team	Apps	(Points)
2017-2019	RC Massy	23	(5)
2019-	Stade Français	90	(20)
- Correct as of 20 June 2021
International career
Years	Team	Apps	(Points)
2018	France U20	7	(0)
2021–	France	2	(0)
- Correct as of 10 July 2024

Pierre-Henri Azagoh (born 25 July 1998) is a French rugby union player, who plays for Stade Français.

== Biography ==
Pierre-Henry Azagoh was called by Fabien Galthié to the French national team for the first time in June 2021, for the Australia summer tour.
