= Bastien Chalureau =

France international rugby union player

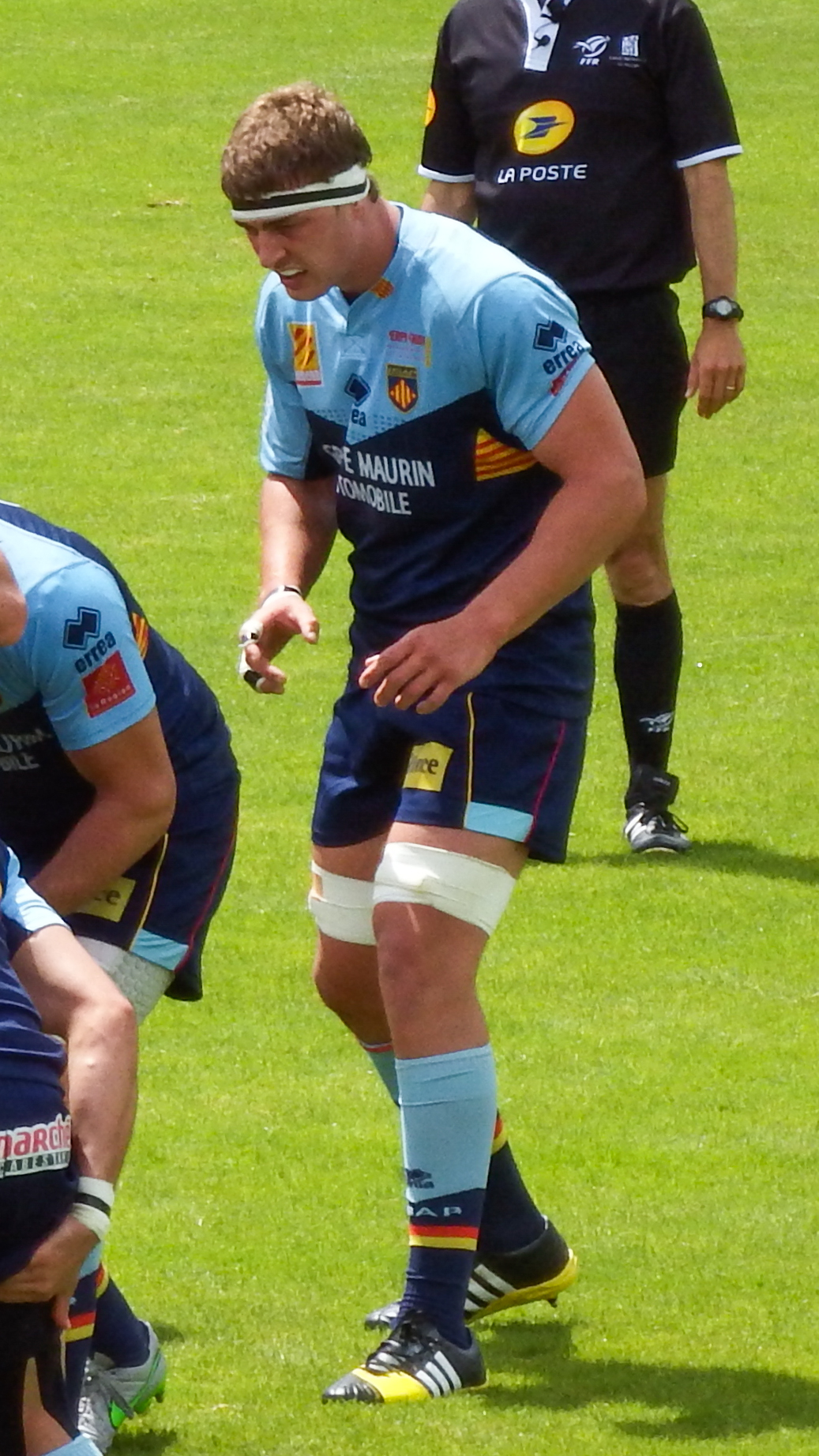
- Chalureau representing Perpignan during the Pro D2
- Born: 13 February 1992 (age 34) Mondavezan, France
- Height: 2.02 m (6 ft 8 in)
- Weight: 124 kg (273 lb; 19 st 7 lb)

Rugby union career
- Position: Lock
- Current team: Montpellier
Youth career
- 1997–2009: US Cazères
- 2009–2014: Toulouse
Senior career
Years	Team	Apps	(Points)
2014–2017	Perpignan	43	(0)
2017–2019	Nevers	28	(0)
2019	Toulouse	1	(0)
2020–	Montpellier	68	(10)
- Correct as of 6 November 2022
International career
Years	Team	Apps	(Points)
2012	France U20	5	(0)
2022–	France	7	(0)
- Correct as of 14 September 2023

Bastien Chalureau (born 13 February 1992) is a French professional rugby union player who plays as a lock for Top 14 club Montpellier and the France national team.

== Early life ==
Born in Mondavezan, Haute-Garonne, Bastien Chalureau started rugby in Cazères and then joined Toulouse youth system in 2009.

== Professional career ==
On 5 March 2020, Chalureau joined Montpellier on a loan deal, and then signed permanently on 22 May. Thereafter, he won 2020–21 Challenge Cup and 2021–22 Top 14 with the Hérault side.

On 7 November 2022, Chalureau was first called by Fabien Galthié to the France national team for the Autumn internationals.

== Judicial conviction for racism ==
Bastien Chalureau was sentenced in 2020, after an assault against two other rugby players in Toulouse, to a six months suspended prison sentence. Then a player at Stade Toulousain, he was fired by his club.

== Honours ==
Montpellier

- 1× Top 14: 2022
- 1× European Rugby Challenge Cup: 2021
