= Sipili Falatea =

France international rugby union player

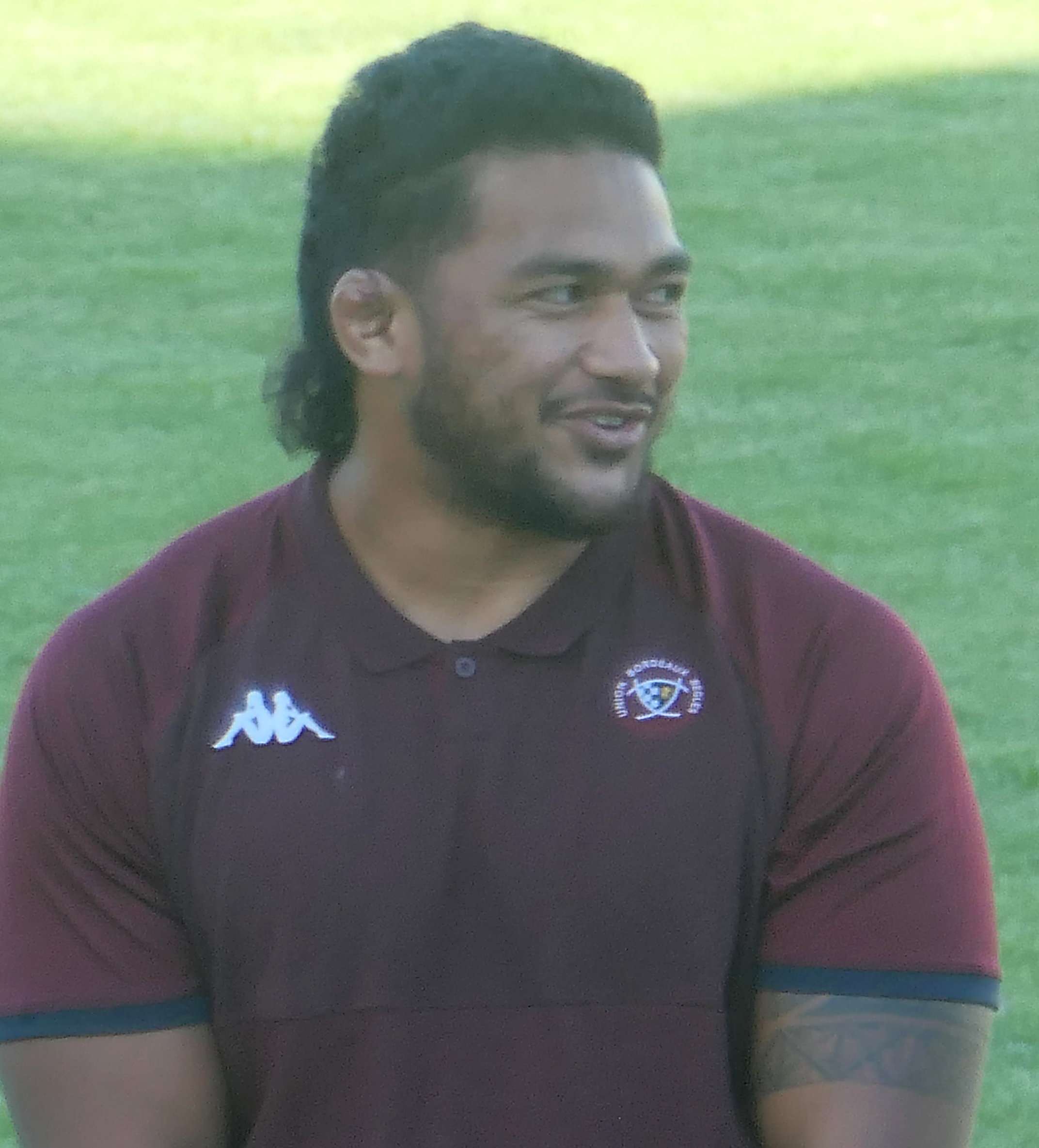
- Falatea representing Bordeaux Bègles
- Born: 6 June 1997 (age 29) Leava, Wallis and Futuna
- Height: 1.84 m (6 ft 0 in)
- Weight: 116 kg (256 lb; 18 st 4 lb)

Rugby union career
- Position: Prop
- Current team: Bordeaux Bègles
Senior career
Years	Team	Apps	(Points)
2017–2022	Clermont	53	(15)
2022–	Bordeaux Bègles	22	(5)
- Correct as of 18 March 2024
International career
Years	Team	Apps	(Points)
2021–	France	14	(5)
- Correct as of 14 September 2023

Sipili Falatea (born 6 June 1997) is a French professional rugby union player who plays as a prop for Top 14 club Bordeaux Bègles and the France national team. Born on the island of Futuna, he joined mainland France in 2015 and began his professional career with Clermont in 2017.

== Early life ==
Originally from Futuna, Sipili Falatea was born into a rugby household with his brother Tapu Falatea and his nephew Yoram Moefana being professional rugby players. He arrived in Metropolitan France in 2015 thanks to his brother, joining Colomiers academy.

== Professional career ==
Sipili Falatea was recruited by Top 14 club Clermont in the summer of 2017. In July 2022, he joined Bordeaux Bègles from the 2022-23 Top 14 season until 2024.

Falatea was called by Fabien Galthié to the French national team for the first time in June 2021, for the summer tour of Australia.

== Career statistics ==
=== List of international tries ===
International tries
No.	Date	Venue	Opponent	Score	Result	Competition
1	12 November 2022	Stade Vélodrome, Marseille, France	South Africa	27–26	30–26	2022 Autumn internationals

== Honours ==
Bordeaux Bègles

- 1× European Rugby Champions Cup: 2025
