= Mickaël Capelli =

French rugby union player (born 1997)

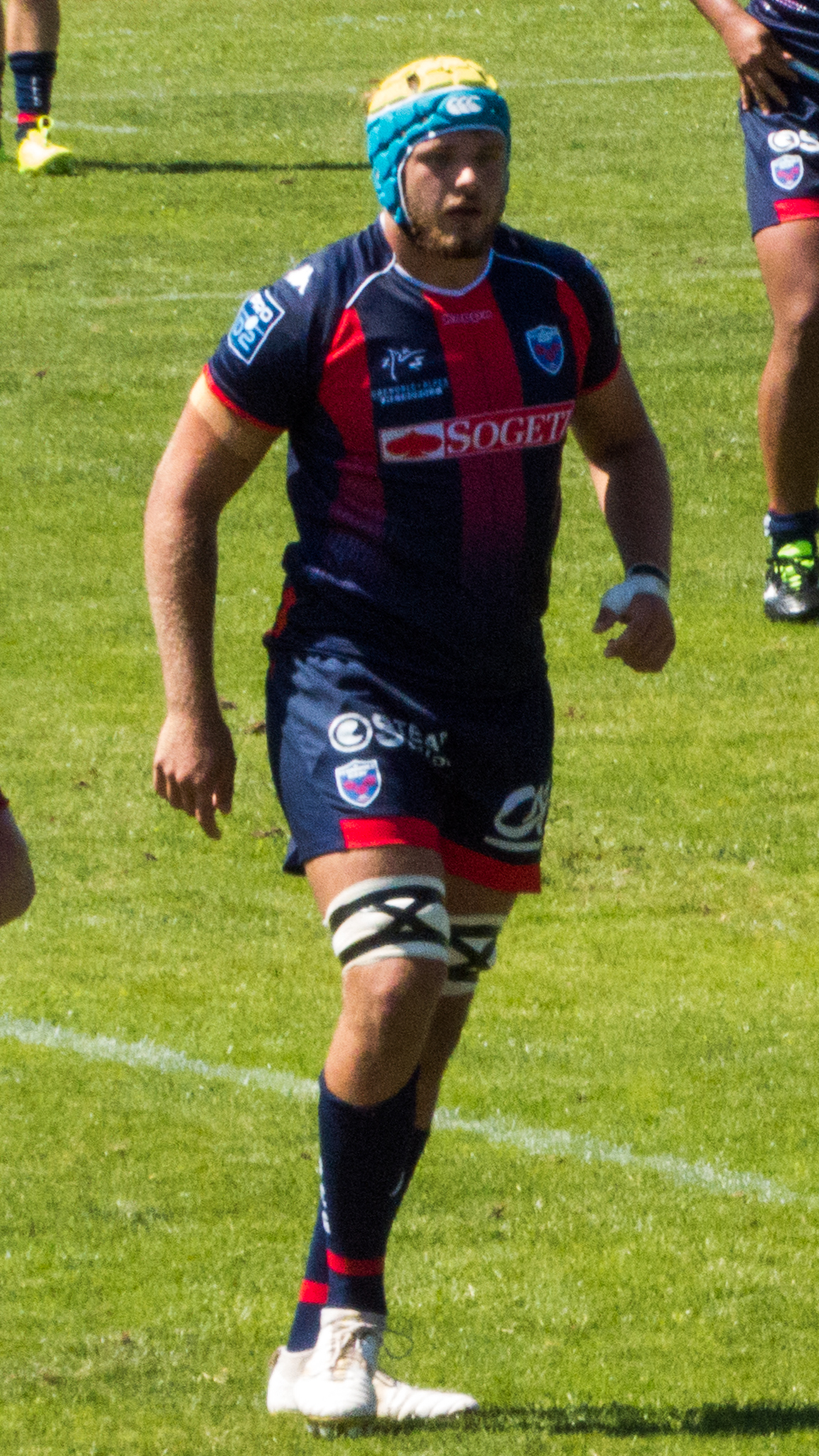
- Born: 18 March 1997 (age 29) Échirolles, France
- Height: 1.98 m (6 ft 6 in)
- Weight: 126 kg (19 st 12 lb; 278 lb)

Rugby union career
- Position: Lock
- Current team: Section Paloise
Youth career
- 2004–2006: Voreppe RC
- 2006–2009: RC Chartreuse Néron
- 2009–2012: SO Voiron
- 2012–2016: FC Grenoble Rugby
Senior career
Years	Team	Apps	(Points)
2016–2020	FC Grenoble Rugby	62	(15)
2020–2022	Montpellier Hérault Rugby	20	(5)
2022–	Section Paloise	21	(5)
- Correct as of 03 April 2024
International career
Years	Team	Apps	(Points)
2016–2018	France U20	11	(5)
- Correct as of 03 April 2024

Mickaël Capelli (born 18 March 1997) is a French rugby union player who plays as a lock for Pau in the Top 14 competition and the France national under-20 team. He made his Top 14 debut with his club in October 2016.

== Playing career ==
=== Early career ===
Mickaël Capelli was born on 18 March 1997, in Échirolles, Isère. He debuted his rugby career at Voreppe Rugby Club before moving on to Rugby Club Chartreuse Néron. In 2009, he signed for SO Voiron before ultimately joining the FC Grenoble training center in 2012.

=== Club career ===
==== FC Grenoble ====
Mickaël Capelli began his professional rugby career at FC Grenoble Rugby from 2016 to 2020. He debuted in June 2016 against Stade Toulousain and earned his first Top 14 start in October 2016. During the 2016–17 Top 14 season, he played 10 matches as well as 6 EPCR Challenge Cup matches. He played in the 2017 World Rugby Under 20 Championship.

After Grenoble was relegated to Pro D2, Capelli scored his first professional try in September 2017. He suffered injuries but returned to play, contributing to Grenoble's matches in both Pro D2 and promotion playoffs. Despite injuries, he renewed his contract until 2021.

==== Montpellier HR ====
Capelli joined Montpellier Hérault Rugby in 2020, signing until 2023. He started the 2020–21 Top 14 season but faced injury setbacks. In the 2021–22 season, Montpellier reached the Top 14 final, where Capelli played as a substitute, contributing to the team's victory. He played twelve matches that season, including the playoffs, and scored a try. Despite his contributions, he opted to leave Montpellier after two seasons.

==== Section Paloise ====
In June 2022, Capelli signed a three-year contract with Section Paloise. During the 2022–23 Top 14 season, he played nine matches and two EPCR Challenge Cup matches. However, his season was marred by repeated concussions, leading to a significant absence. In the 2023–24 season, Capelli continued to be a key player for Pau, playing in nine matches before suffering a season-ending knee injury in January 2024.
