= Tate McDermott =

Australia international rugby union player

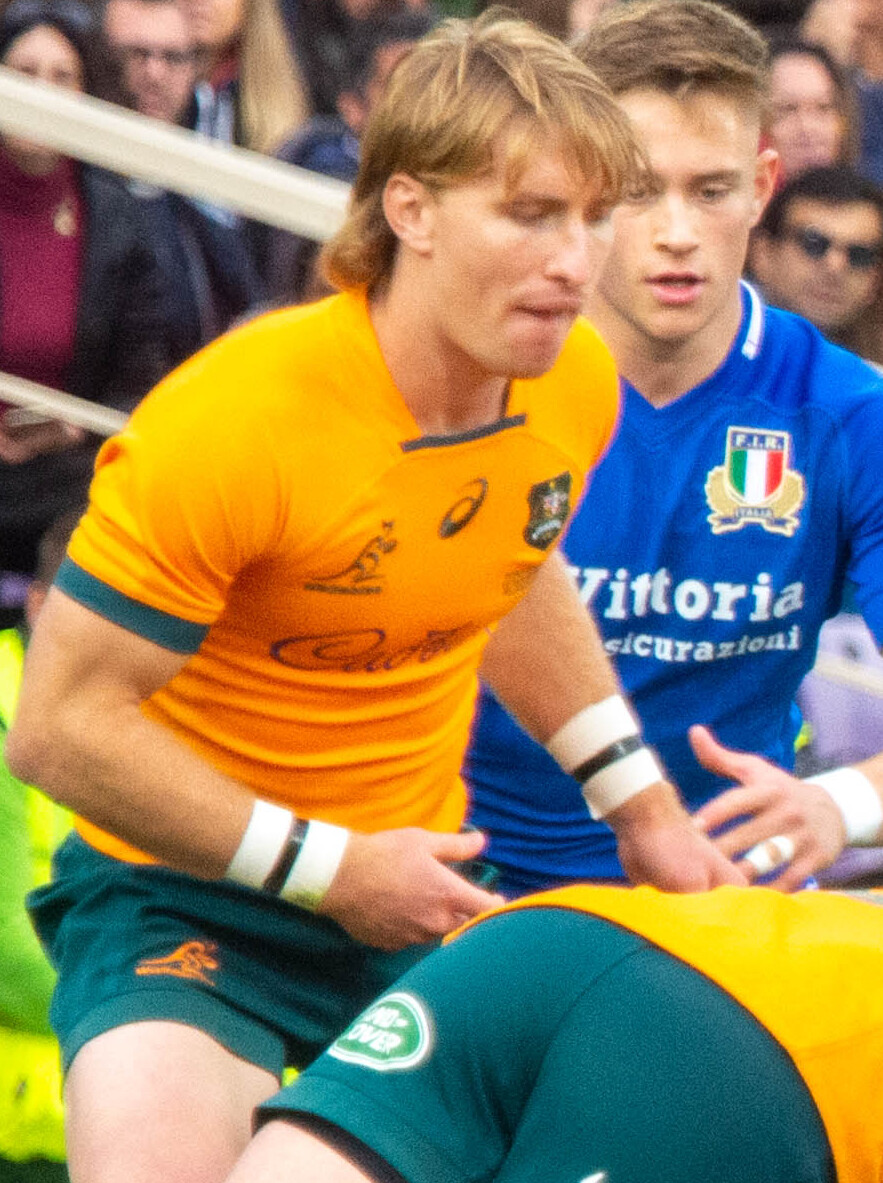
- McDermott with Australia in the 2022
- Born: 18 September 1998 (age 28) Bundaberg, Queensland, Australia
- Height: 1.79 m (5 ft 10 in)
- Weight: 82 kg (181 lb; 12 st 13 lb)
- School: Sunshine Coast Grammar School

Rugby union career
- Position(s): Scrum-half, Wing (Note: In 2025, McDermott has been used as a substitute wing and utility back for Australia.)
- Current team: Queensland Reds
Senior career
Years	Team	Apps	(Points)
2017–2019	Queensland Country	20	(40)
2016–	Queensland Reds	108	(170)
- Correct as of 6 June 2026
International career
Years	Team	Apps	(Points)
2018	Australia U20	5	(10)
2020–	Australia	57	(30)
- Correct as of 10 October 2026
National sevens team
Years	Team		Comps
2017	Australia		4
- Correct as of 12 March 2017

Tate McDermott (born 18 September 1998) is an Australian professional rugby union player who plays as a scrum-half for Super Rugby club Queensland Reds and the Australia national team.

== Club career ==
In 2017, McDermott made his Australian Men's Seven debut at the Wellington Sevens. He also debuted in 2017 in the NRC Championship for Queensland Country. In round 2 of the 2018 Super Rugby season, McDermott made his debut off the bench for the Queensland Reds. McDermott has since had a stellar 2020 campaign with the Queensland Reds in Super Rugby AU starting all nine matches played and scoring 10 points.

== International career ==
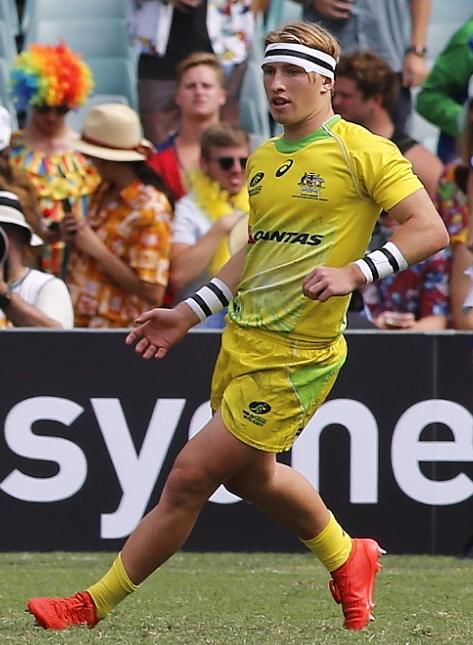
McDermott with Australia Sevens in 2017

In late 2020, McDermott was called up to the Wallabies as scrum-half under Dave Rennie, which was an extended 44-man squad. He was rewarded due to an excellent season with the Reds. He made his debut against the New Zealand national rugby union team in a record 43–5 loss.

He played all games in the 2021 France rugby union tour of Australia, starting in one game and coming off the bench for the rest, and scoring his maiden try in the deciding test, won 33-30 and confirming the Trophee des Bicentenaries would remain with Australia. McDermott also appeared in the 2021 Bledisloe Cup series, where the Wallabies lost both games at Eden Park in Auckland. He would play a pivotal role in the Wallabies' wins against the Springboks and the Pumas, but was replaced by fellow halfback Nic White in a test against Argentina, forcing him to be benched, and dropped all-together in the final test against Los Pumas, being replaced by Jake Gordon.

In September 2023, McDermott was named vice-captain of the Wallabies prior to the 2023 Rugby World Cup.

== Personal life ==
McDermott used to surf competitively but quit to focus on rugby when his childhood friend drowned at the Australian Surf Lifesaving Championships on the Gold Coast.
