= Ugo Boniface =

- Boniface with Union Bordeaux Bègles in 2022
- Born: 21 July 1998 (age 28) Marmande, France
- Height: 1.90 m (6 ft 3 in)
- Weight: 125 kg (276 lb)

Rugby union career
- Position: Prop
- Current team: Vannes
Youth career
- 2004–2012: Casteljaloux
- 2012–2013: Nérac
- 2013–2016: Agen
- 2016–2017: Aviron Bayonnais
Senior career
Years	Team	Apps	(Points)
2017–2022	Aviron Bayonnais	81	(10)
2022–2026	Bordeaux Bègles	74	(40)
2026-	Vannes	0	(0)
- Correct as of 13:14, 5 September 2026 (UTC)

Ugo Boniface (born 21 July 1998) is a French rugby union player who plays as a prop for Vannes in the Top 14.

He began his professional career with Aviron Bayonnais in 2017, playing in Pro D2 and the Top 14. In 2022, he moved to Union Bordeaux Bègles, where he won the European Rugby Champions Cup in 2025 and 2026.

== Career ==
Boniface was born in Marmande in Lot-et-Garonne, and his father and grandfather were also rugby players who played as props for US Casteljaloux. He began playing for the club's youth teams at age six. After one year with US Nérac, he then moved to SU Agen, where he was a national youth champion in 2014, and in 2016 he joined Aviron Bayonnais.

Boniface began playing professionally for Aviron in Pro D2 in 2017–18. After their relegation from the Top 14 in 2021, it was announced in November that at the end of his contract with the end of the season, he would move on a two-year contract to Union Bordeaux Bègles. He arrived to replace Thierry Paiva, who moved to Stade Rochelais. In October 2022, after three appearances of which one was a start, he was ruled out for two months due to operation on a meniscus tear obtained at his previous club. The following 21 January, with his team already eliminated, he scored a try in a 26–17 home loss to Gloucester in the pool stage of the European Rugby Champions Cup.

Despite his club announcing the signing of a new prop in Matis Perchaud, Boniface signed a new three-year deal in January 2024 to remain contracted to UBB until 2027. In 2023–24, Bordeaux-Bègles reached the Top 14 final, with him coming on as a substitute in a 59–3 loss to Toulouse. In the 2025 European Rugby Champions Cup final against Northampton Saints at the Millennium Stadium, he came off the bench in a 28–20 win. In the next year's final against Leinster in Bilbao, he was a substitute and received a late yellow card in a ruck, as his team won 41–19.

On 17 June 2026, Boniface transferred to newly promoted Vannes on a three-year deal.

== International career ==
Boniface was called up for France's under-18 B-team for the Schools Three Nations in Ireland in 2016, but was promoted to the main under-18 team for the Rugby Europe Under-18 Championship. After a British and Irish withdrawal, his team won the final 42–0 in Portugal, against Georgia.

With the under-20 team, Boniface won the Six Nations Under 20s Championship and the Under-20 World Cup in 2018.
