= Baptiste Pesenti =

French rugby union player

- Born: 3 July 1997 (age 29) Saint-Claude, France
- Height: 1.95 m (6 ft 5 in)
- Weight: 118 kg (18 st 8 lb)

Rugby union career
- Position(s): Lock, flanker
Youth career
- 2012–2016: Montpellier
- 2016–2017: Pau
Senior career
Years	Team	Apps	(Points)
2017–2021	Pau	71	(40)
2021–2022	Racing 92	13	(5)
2022–	Stade Français	68	(10)
- Correct as of 28 October 2025
International career
Years	Team	Apps	(Points)
2016–2017	France U20	10	(15)
2020–	France	6	(0)
- Correct as of 13 July 2024

Baptiste Pesenti (born 3 July 1997) is a French rugby union player. His position is lock or flanker and he currently plays for Stade Français in the French Top 14.

In 2020, Pesenti was selected on several occasions by Fabien Galthié for the France national rugby union team.
