= James Doleman =

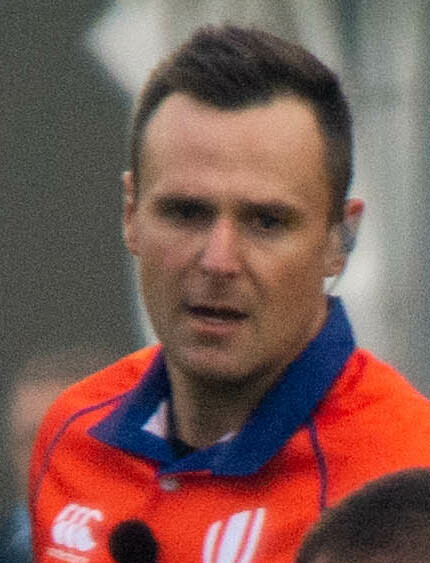
- Born: James Doleman

Rugby union career
Refereeing career
Years	Competition	Apps
2020–present	World Rugby Sevens Series	
2020–present	Super Rugby	
2020	Pro14	
2016–present	National Provincial Championship	
- Correct as of 5 October 2025

James Doleman is a Australian professional rugby union referee.

== Refereeing career ==
Doleman began refereeing while a student in Dunedin.

He started refereeing matches in the Heartland Championship in 2014 and the National Provincial Championship in 2016.

He became a professional referee in 2020. In 2019 he had refereed the final of the 2019 World Rugby Under 20 Championship. He refereed his first Super Rugby match on 7 March 2020 in a match between the Rebels and Lions, before refereeing 3 matches in the 2020 Super Rugby Aotearoa season. He also refereed the Championship final of the 2020 Mitre 10 Cup as Hawke's Bay played Northland.

=== Test matches ===
In the international arena he has refereed the following matches:

- 2021: Australia v France (Melbourne)
- 2021: Italy v Argentina (Treviso)
- 2021: Georgia v Fiji (Aranjuez)
- 2022: Australia v England (Perth)
- 2022: Argentina v South Africa (Buenos Aires)
- 2022: England v Japan (London)
- 2023: England v Italy (London)
- 2023: Tonga v Canada (Nuku'alofa)
- 2024: England v Wales (London)
- 2024: Australia v Georgia (Sydney)
- 2024: Fiji v Samoa (Suva)
- 2024: Argentina v Australia (Buenos Aires)
- 2024: Wales v Australia (Cardiff)
