= Tani Vili =

French rugby union player

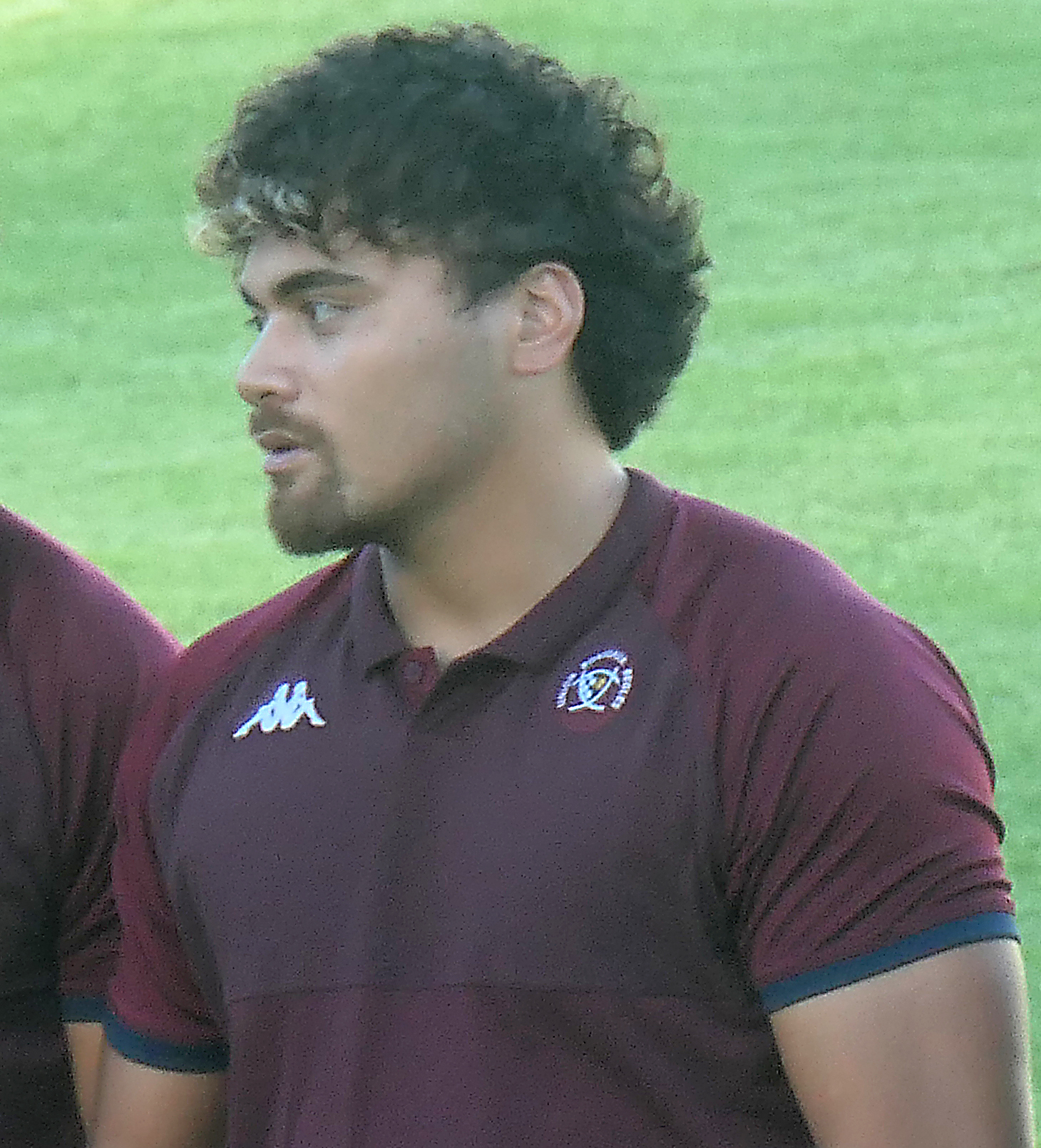
- Vili with Bordeaux Bègles in 2022
- Born: 31 October 2000 (age 26) Brive-la-Gaillarde, France
- Height: 1.87 m (6 ft 1 1/2 in)
- Weight: 105 kg (231 lb)

Rugby union career
- Position: Centre
- Current team: Stade Français
Youth career
- 2006–2007: Saint-Céré
- 2007–2008: Brive
- 2011–2013: Malemort
- 2013–2017: Brive
- 2017–2019: Clermont
Senior career
Years	Team	Apps	(Points)
2019–2022	Clermont	36	(20)
2022–2024	Bordeaux Bègles	27	(3)
2024–2025	Vannes	14	(10)
2025-	Stade Français	18	(25)
- Correct as of 25 May 2025
International career
Years	Team	Apps	(Points)
2020	France U20	2	(0)
- Correct as of 20 June 2021

Tani Vili (born 31 October 2000) is a French rugby union player, who plays for Vannes. His usual playing position is centre. He was born in France to parents from Wallis and Futuna and New Caledonia.

== Biography ==
Tani Vili was called by Fabien Galthié to the French national team for the first time in June 2021, for the summer tour of Australia.
