= Florent Vanverberghe =

French rugby union player

- Born: 22 July 2000 (age 26) La Seyne-sur-Mer, France
- Height: 1.98 m (6 ft 6 in)
- Weight: 121 kg (267 lb)

Rugby union career
- Position: Lock
Senior career
Years	Team	Apps	(Points)
2018–2020	Toulon	3	(0)
2020–	Castres	60	(20)
- Correct as of 20 June 2021
International career
Years	Team	Apps	(Points)
2019	France U20	9	(0)
- Correct as of 10 July 2024

Florent Vanverberghe (born 22 July 2000) is a French rugby union player, who plays for Castres Olympique.

== Biography ==
Florent Vanverberghe was called by Fabien Galthié to the French national team for the first time in June 2021, for the Australia summer tour.
