= Cyril Cazeaux =

France international rugby union player

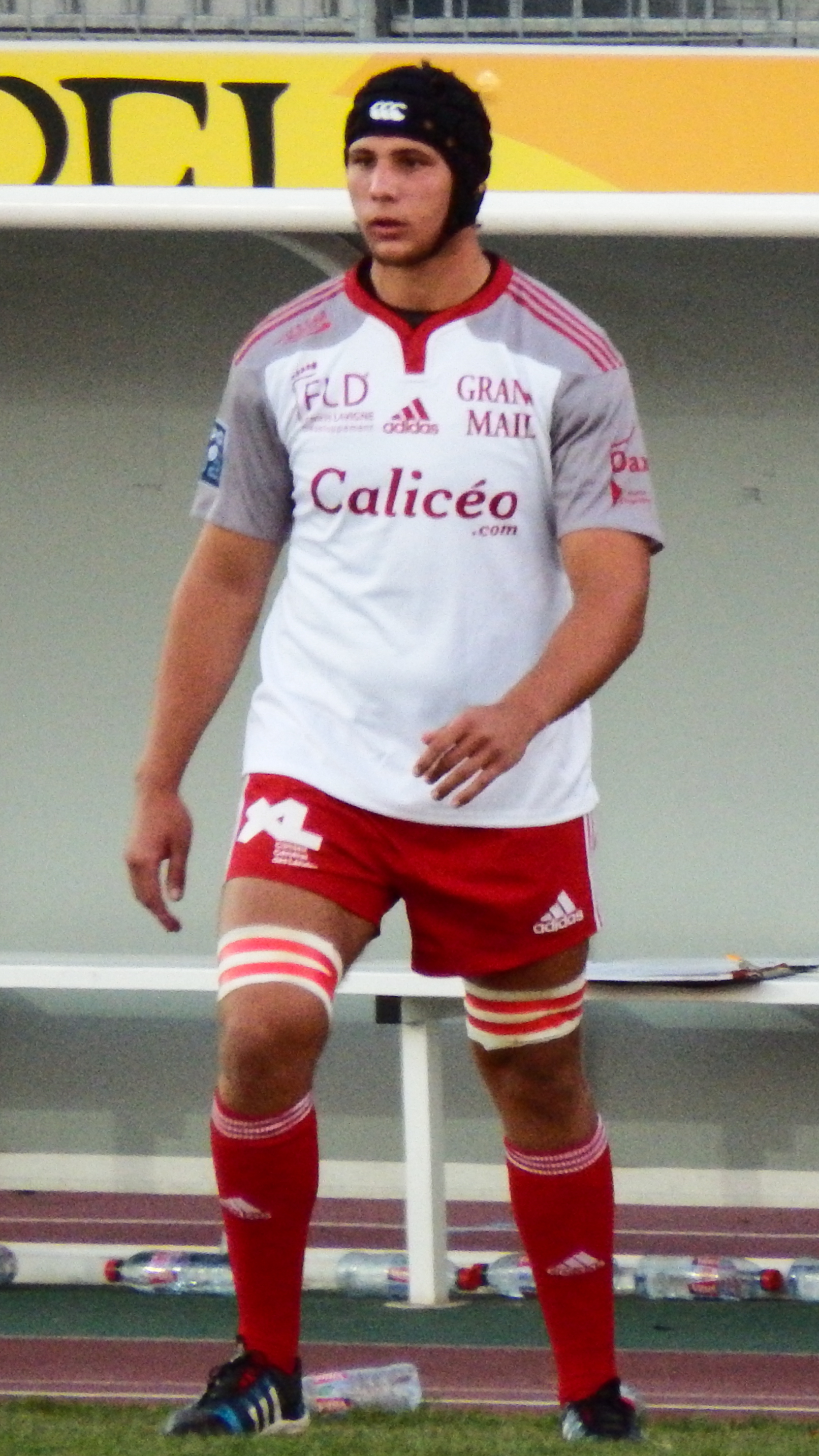
- Cazeaux with Dax in 2014
- Born: Cyril Cazeaux; 10 February 1995 (age 31) Dax, France
- Height: 1.98 m (6 ft 6 in)
- Weight: 117 kg (18 st 6 lb)

Rugby union career
- Position: Lock
Senior career
Years	Team	Apps	(Points)
2014–2015	Dax	9	(5)
2015–	Bordeaux Bègles	107	(15)
- Correct as of 29 December 2019
International career
Years	Team	Apps	(Points)
2015	France U20	2	(0)
2020–	France	4	(0)
- Correct as of 13 July 2021

Cyril Cazeaux (born 10 February 1995) is a French professional rugby union player. As of 2024, he plays at lock for Bordeaux Bègles in the Top 14.

== Honours ==
Bordeaux Bègles

- 1× European Rugby Champions Cup: 2025
