= Alex Masibaka =

Scottish rugby union player

- Born: Alexander Masibaka; 9 August 2001 (age 25) Perth, Australia
- Height: 1.86 m (6 ft 1 in)
- Weight: 115 kg (254 lb)

Rugby union career
- Current team: Montpellier
Senior career
Years	Team	Apps	(Points)
2021–2022	Western Force	2	(0)
2022–	Montpellier	16	(30)
2023–2025	→Soyaux Angoulême	41	(85)
- Correct as of 22 October 2025
International career
Years	Team	Apps	(Points)
2026	Scotland 'A'	1	(0)

Alexander Masibaka (born 9 August 2001) is a Scotland 'A' international rugby union player who plays as a number eight for French Top 14 club Montpellier. Born in Australia, he is eligible to represent Scotland at international level through his Paisley-born mother.

== Club career ==
He was named in the Force squad as for Round 11 of the 2022 Super Rugby Pacific season. He made his debut in the same fixture, coming on as a replacement.

== International career ==
Masibaka is eligible for Australia through birth, Scotland through his Paisley born mother, and Fiji through his father.

In January 2025, following an injury to Josh Bayliss and despite playing in the French second tier, he received a call up to the Scotland senior training squad for the 2025 Six Nations. It was understood that the Scotland management staff had been tracking his progress as early as 2021.

He played for Scotland in the non-cap match against Māori All Blacks on 5 July 2025. In October 2025, he was selected for the 2025 Autumn Nations Series.

He played for Scotland 'A' on 6 February 2026 in their match against Italy XV.
