= Baptiste Couilloud =

France international rugby union player

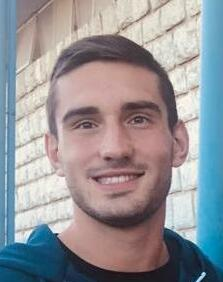
- Full name: Baptiste Amédée Couilloud
- Born: 22 July 1997 (age 29) Lyon, France
- Height: 1.76 m (5 ft 9 in)
- Weight: 78 kg (172 lb; 12 st 4 lb)

Rugby union career
- Position: Scrum-half
- Current team: Lyon
Senior career
Years	Team	Apps	(Points)
2016–	Lyon	188	(402)
- Correct as of 23 October 2024
International career
Years	Team	Apps	(Points)
2016–2017	France U20	19	(32)
2017	French Barbarians	1	(0)
2018–	France	17	(20)
- Correct as of 10 July 2024

Baptiste Amédée Couilloud (born 22 July 1997) is a French professional rugby union player who plays as a scrum-half for Top 14 club Lyon and the France national team.

== Professional career ==
Couilloud was called up to the French national team for the first time ahead of France's second 2018 Six Nations Championship match against Scotland as a replacement for Antoine Dupont who was injured in the first match against Ireland. He made his debut two weeks later against Italy coming on for Maxime Machenaud in the 70th minute of an eventual 34–17 home victory.

== Career statistics ==
=== List of international tries ===
International tries
No.	Date	Venue	Opponent	Score	Result	Competition
1	17 July 2021	Suncorp Stadium, Brisbane, Australia	Australia	0–8	33–30	2021 Australia test series
2	9 July 2022	National Stadium, Tokyo, Japan	Japan	15–18	15–20	2022 Japan test series
3	5 August 2023	Murrayfield Stadium, Edinburgh, Scotland	Scotland	3–5	25–21	2023 Rugby World Cup warm-up matches
4	21 September 2023	Stade Vélodrome, Marseille, France	Namibia	59–0	96–0	2023 Rugby World Cup
