= Gaëtan Barlot =

French rugby union player (born 1997)

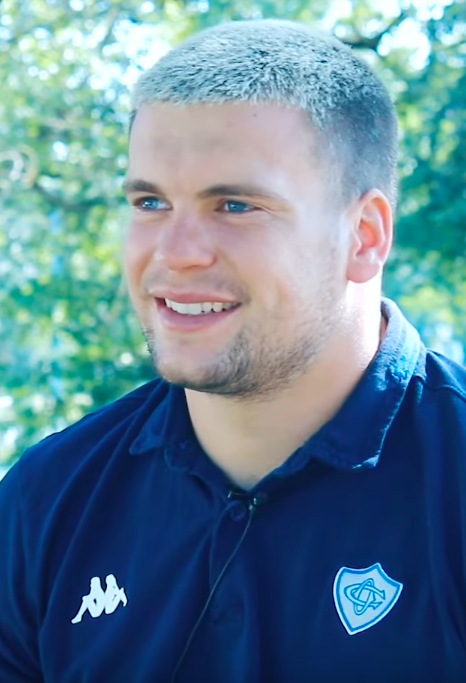
- Barlot representing Castres
- Born: 13 April 1997 (age 29) Beaumont, France
- Height: 1.84 m (6 ft 0 in)
- Weight: 107 kg (236 lb; 16 st 12 lb)

Rugby union career
- Position: Hooker
- Current team: Castres
Senior career
Years	Team	Apps	(Points)
2017–2020	Colomiers	37	(25)
2020–	Castres	69	(50)
- Correct as of 4 June 2023
International career
Years	Team	Apps	(Points)
2021–	France	12	(0)
- Correct as of 19 July 2025

Gaëtan Barlot (born 13 April 1997) is a French professional rugby union player who plays as a hooker for Top 14 club Castres and the France national team.

Following an outburst of COVID-19 in the French squad, he was called up for the first time by Fabien Galthié to the France national rugby team on 22 February 2021.
