= Ibrahim Diallo (rugby union) =

France international rugby union player (born 1998)

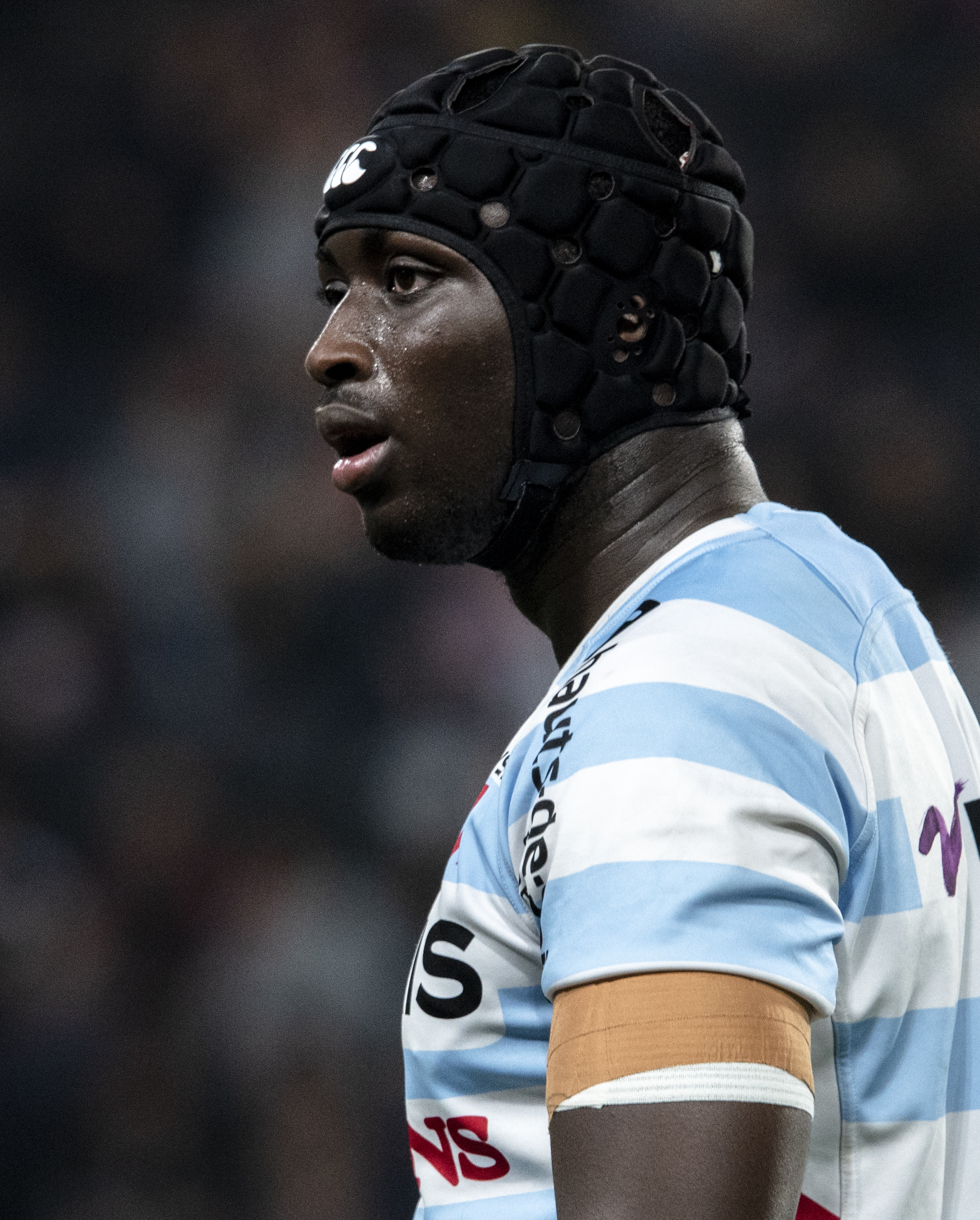
- Diallo playing for Racing 92 in 2019
- Born: Ibrahim Diallo; 23 January 1998 (age 28) Sarcelles, France
- Height: 1.92 m (6 ft 3 1/2 in)
- Weight: 108 kg (17 st 0 lb)

Rugby union career
- Position: Back row
- Current team: Racing 92
Amateur team(s)
Years	Team	Apps	(Points)
2009–2013	AAS Sarcelles		
2013–2018	Racing 92		
Senior career
Years	Team	Apps	(Points)
2018–	Racing 92	37	(10)
- Correct as of 14 May 2021
International career
Years	Team	Apps	(Points)
2017–2018	France U20	8	(5)
2021–	France	3	(0)
- Correct as of 10 July 2024

Ibrahim Diallo (born 23 January 1998) is a French rugby union player. His position is in the back row and he currently plays for Racing 92 in the Top 14.

== Honours ==
=== International ===
France (U20)

- World Rugby Under 20 Championship winners: 2018
