= Julien Hériteau =

France international rugby union player (born 1994)

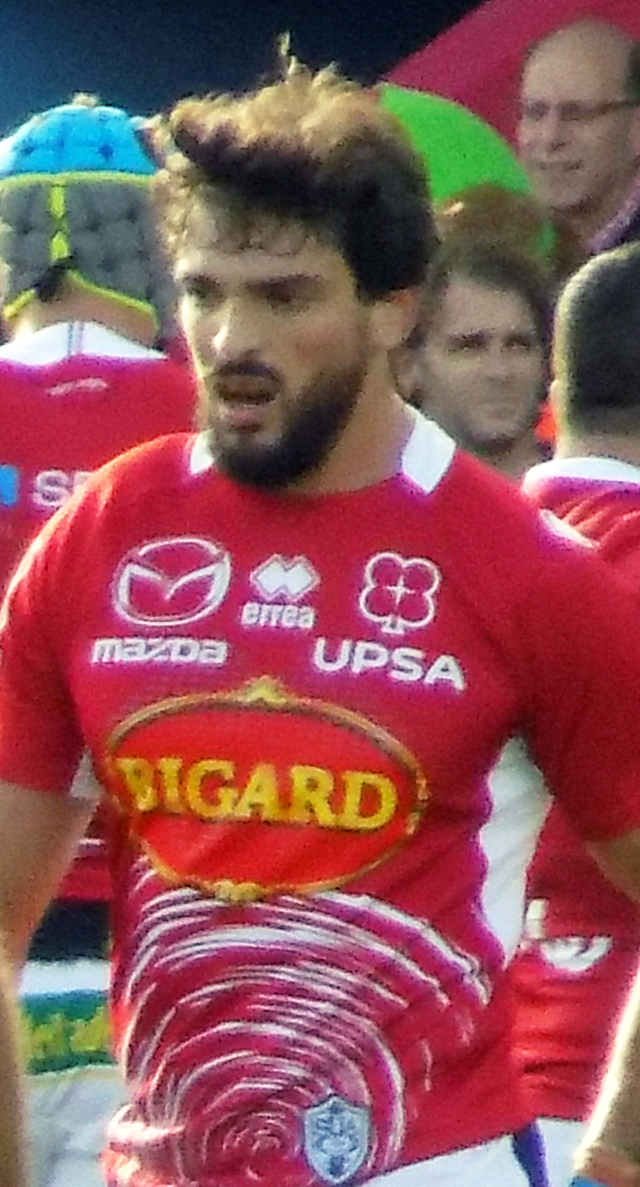
- Born: 12 September 1994 (age 32) Agen, France
- Height: 1.82 m (5 ft 11 1/2 in)
- Weight: 89 kg (14 st 0 lb)

Rugby union career
- Position: Centre
Senior career
Years	Team	Apps	(Points)
2014–2019	Agen	66	(25)
2019–2022	Toulon	46	(40)
2022–	Clermont	7	(5)
- Correct as of 20 July 2022
International career
Years	Team	Apps	(Points)
2013	France U20	2	(0)
2021–	France	1	(0)
- Correct as of 17 July 2021
National sevens team
Years	Team		Comps
2014	France 7s		6

Julien Hériteau (born 12 September 1994) is a French rugby union player. His position is center, and he currently plays for Clermont in the Top 14. Julien is a product of the Agen youth system, first playing for the first team in 2014.

He is a French rugby union centre who has been described a physical and direct-running player.

In late December 2018 it was announced that Hériteau had signed a three-year contract with rival Top 14 club RC Toulon, making his debut soon after.

== International career ==
In 2020, Hériteau was called up for the first time for his country, France, in preparation for the 2020 Six Nations Championship, following Fabien Galthié's appointment as the new head coach of the French national side. Hériteau was one of 42 initial players chosen to partake in pre-tournament training and test matches.
