= Wilfrid Hounkpatin =

France international rugby union player

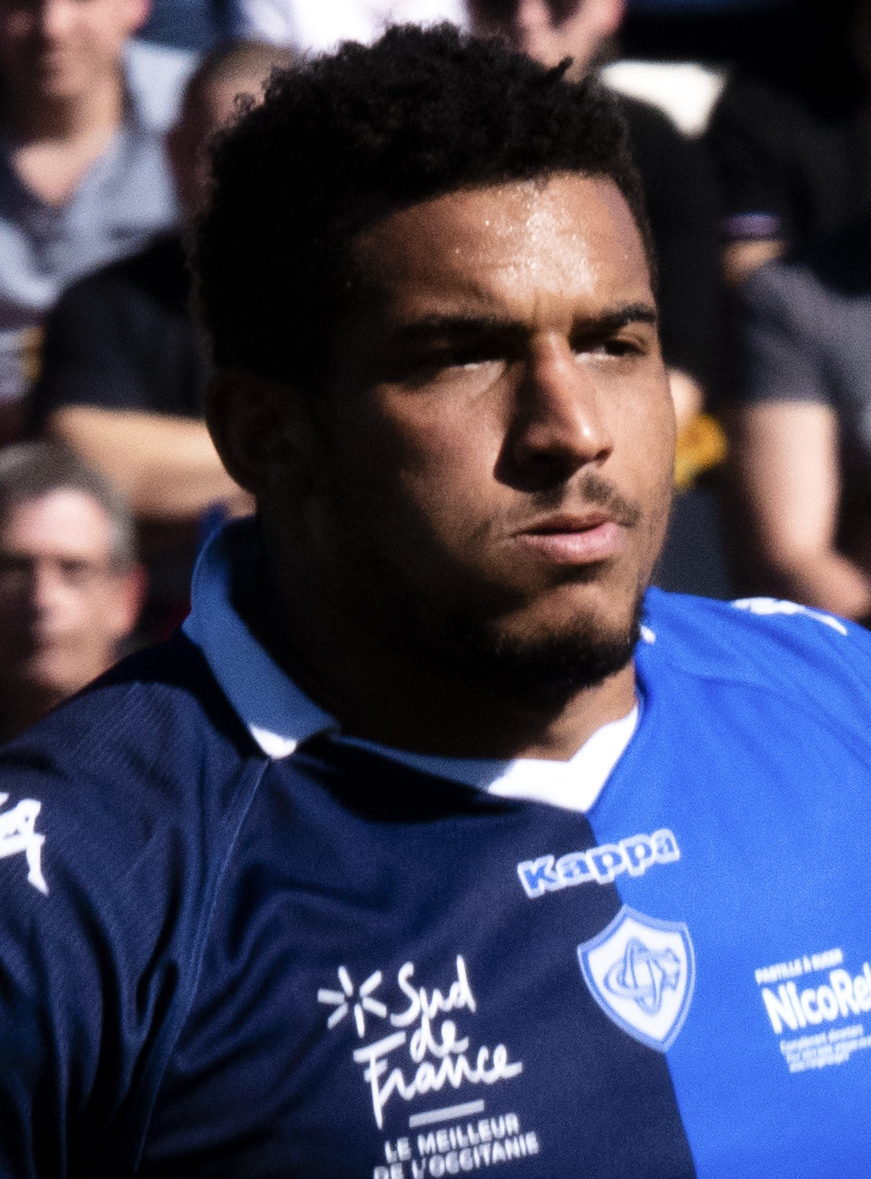
- Born: Wilfrid Hounkpatin; 29 July 1991 (age 35) Aubagne, France
- Height: 1.92 m (6 ft 3 1/2 in)
- Weight: 132 kg (20 st 11 lb; 291 lb)

Rugby union career
- Position: Prop
- Current team: Montpellier
Senior career
Years	Team	Apps	(Points)
2013–2014	Narbonne	3	(0)
2015–2018	Rouen	61	(30)
2018–2024	Castres	122	(80)
2024–	Montpellier	21	(10)
- Correct as of 2 April 2025
International career
Years	Team	Apps	(Points)
2021	France	1	(0)
2025–	Senegal	1	(0)
- Correct as of 5 March 2026

Wilfrid Hounkpatin (born 29 July 1991) is a Senegalese rugby union player. His position is prop and he currently plays for Montpellier Hérault Rugby in the Top 14.
