= Alexandre Bécognée =

France international rugby union player

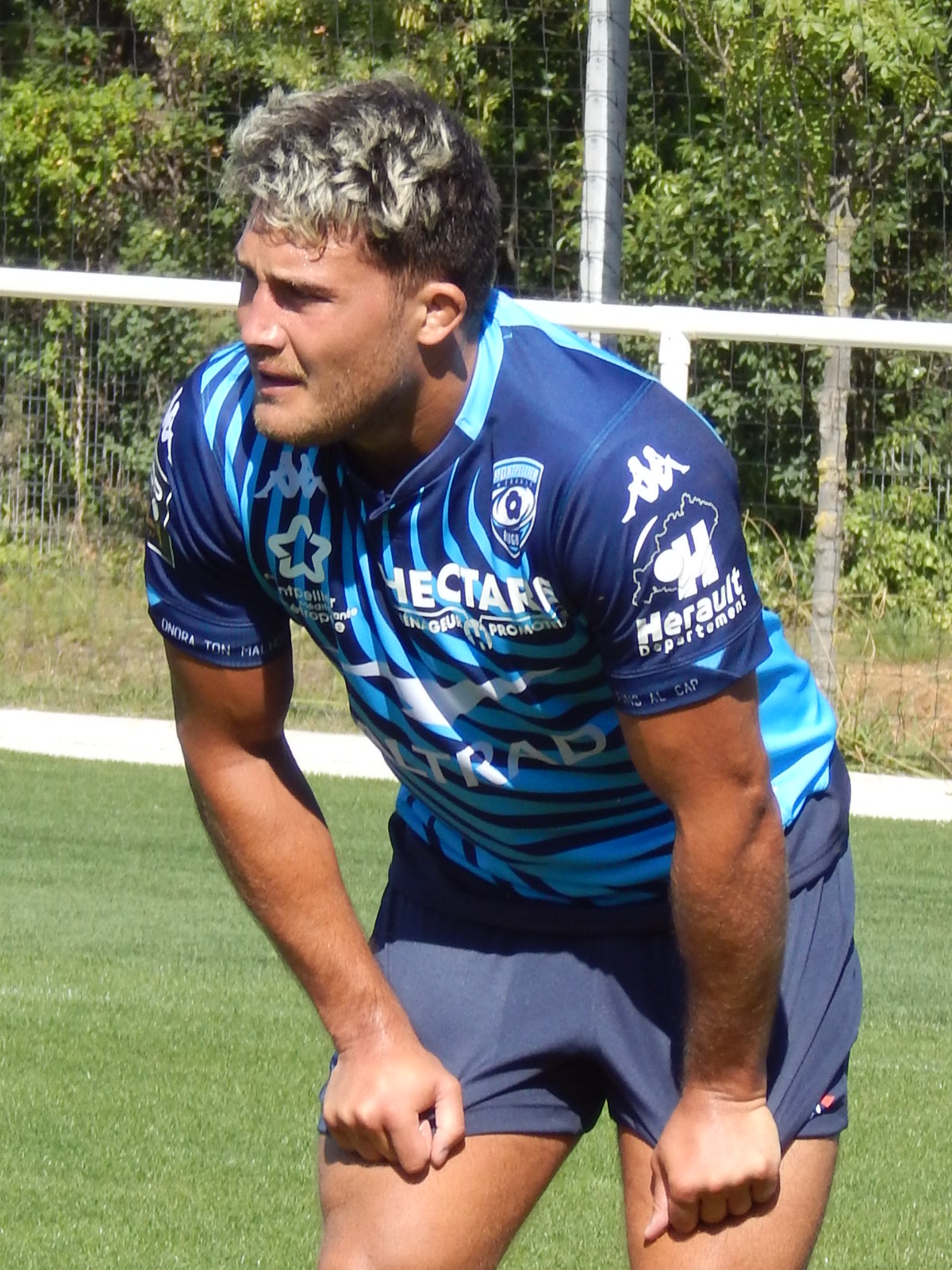
- Born: 3 September 1996 (age 30) Bordeaux, France
- Height: 189 cm (6 ft 2 in)
- Weight: 106 kg (234 lb; 16 st 10 lb)

Rugby union career
- Position: Flanker
- Current team: Montpellier
Senior career
Years	Team	Apps	(Points)
2017–2020	Mont-de-Marsan	59	(20)
2020–	Montpellier	30	(15)
- Correct as of 31 October 2021
International career
Years	Team	Apps	(Points)
2021–	France	1	(0)
- Correct as of 31 October 2021

Alexandre Bécognée (born 3 September 1996) is a French rugby union player who plays for Montpellier in the Top 14. His playing position is flanker. Bécognée signed for Montpellier in 2020, following two seasons at Mont-de-Marsan. He made his debut for France in the 2021 July rugby union tests against Australia.
