= Cameron Woki =

France international rugby union player

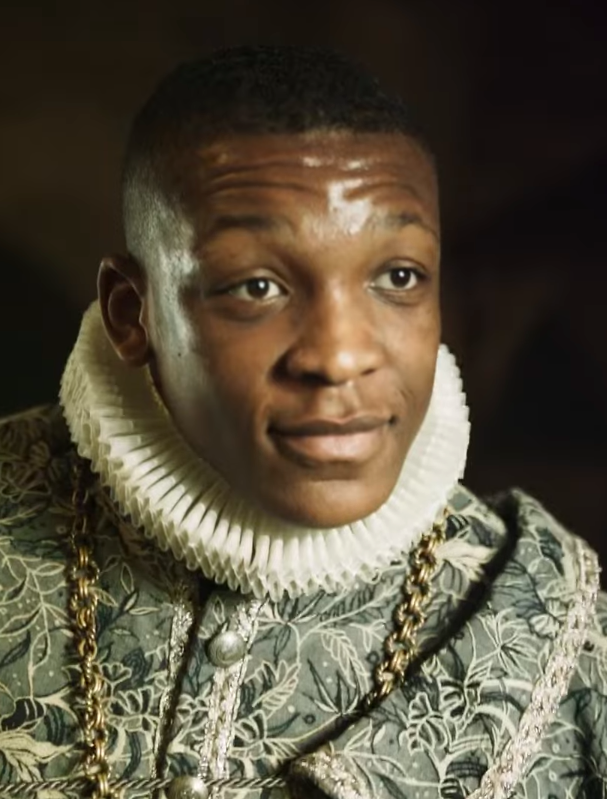
- Woki in a 2022 Renault advertisement
- Born: 7 November 1998 (age 28) Saint-Denis, France
- Height: 1.96 m (6 ft 5 in)
- Weight: 109 kg (240 lb; 17 st 2 lb)

Rugby union career
- Position: Lock / Flanker / Number 8
- Current team: Union Bordeaux Bègles
Youth career
- 2008–2012: AC Bobigny 93
- 2012–2017: RC Massy
Senior career
| Years | Team | Apps | (Points) |
| 2017–2022 | Bordeaux Bègles | 96 | (95) |
| 2022–2025 | Racing 92 | 72 | (25) |
| 2025– | Bordeaux Bègles | 28 | (60) |
- Correct as of 25 October 2026
International career
| Years | Team | Apps | (Points) |
| 2017–2018 | France U20 | 9 | (10) |
| 2020– | France | 34 | (15) |
- Correct as of 13 November 2026

Cameron Woki (born 7 November 1998) is a French professional rugby union player, who plays as a lock or flanker for Top 14 club Union Bordeaux Bègles and the France national team.

== International career ==
He was a part of the French squad that won the Grand Slam during the 2022 Six Nations. In August 2023, Woki was named in the 33-man France squad for the 2023 Rugby World Cup.

=== International tries ===
International tries scored by Cameron Woki
| No. | Date | Venue | Opponent | Score | Result | Competition |
|---|---|---|---|---|---|---|
| 1 | 17 July 2021 | Suncorp Stadium, Brisbane, Australia | Australia | 17–18 | 33–30 | 2021 Australia test series |
| 2 | 5 August 2023 | Murrayfield Stadium, Edinburgh, Scotland | Scotland | 3–19 | 25–21 | 2023 Rugby World Cup warm-up matches |
| 3 | 5 July 2025 | Forsyth Barr Stadium, Dunedin, New Zealand | New Zealand | 28–25 | 31–27 | 2025 New Zealand test series |

== Personal life ==
His parents are Congolese.

== Honours ==
France

- 2× Six Nations Championship: 2022, 2026

France U20

- World Rugby Under 20 Championship: 2018
- Six Nations Under 20s Championship: 2018

Bordeaux Bègles

- 1× European Rugby Champions Cup: 2026
