= Quentin Walcker =

French rugby union player

- Born: 21 February 1996 (age 30) Le Creusot, France
- Height: 181 cm (5 ft 11 in)
- Weight: 118 kg (260 lb; 18 st 8 lb)

Rugby union career
- Position: Prop
- Current team: Castres
Senior career
Years	Team	Apps	(Points)
2016–2021	Perpignan	70	(25)
2021–	Castres	26	(0)
- Correct as of 31 Oct 2021
International career
Years	Team	Apps	(Points)
2015–2016	France U20	5	(0)
2021–	France	2	(0)
- Correct as of 17 July 2021

Quentin Walcker (born 21 February 1996 in France) is a French rugby union player who plays for Castres in the Top 14. His playing position is prop. Walcker signed for Castres in 2021, following five seasons at Perpignan. He made his debut for France in the 2021 July rugby union tests against Australia.
