= Thierry Paiva =

French rugby union player

- Born: 19 November 1995 (age 30) Bordeaux, France
- Height: 1.84 m (6 ft 0 in)
- Weight: 125 kg (276 lb)

Rugby union career
- Position: Prop
- Current team: Bordeaux Bègles
Senior career
Years	Team	Apps	(Points)
2017–	Bordeaux Bègles	50	(10)
- Correct as of 9 January 2020
International career
Years	Team	Apps	(Points)
2015	France U20	5	(0)
- Correct as of 9 January 2020

Thierry Paiva (born 19 November 1995) is a French rugby union player. His usual position is as a loose-head prop, and he currently plays for Bordeaux Bègles in the Top 14. He is of Angolan descent.

In February 2021 he was called into the France Senior Test team for the 2021 Six Nations.
