= Fabien Galthié =

French rugby union player and manager (born 1969)

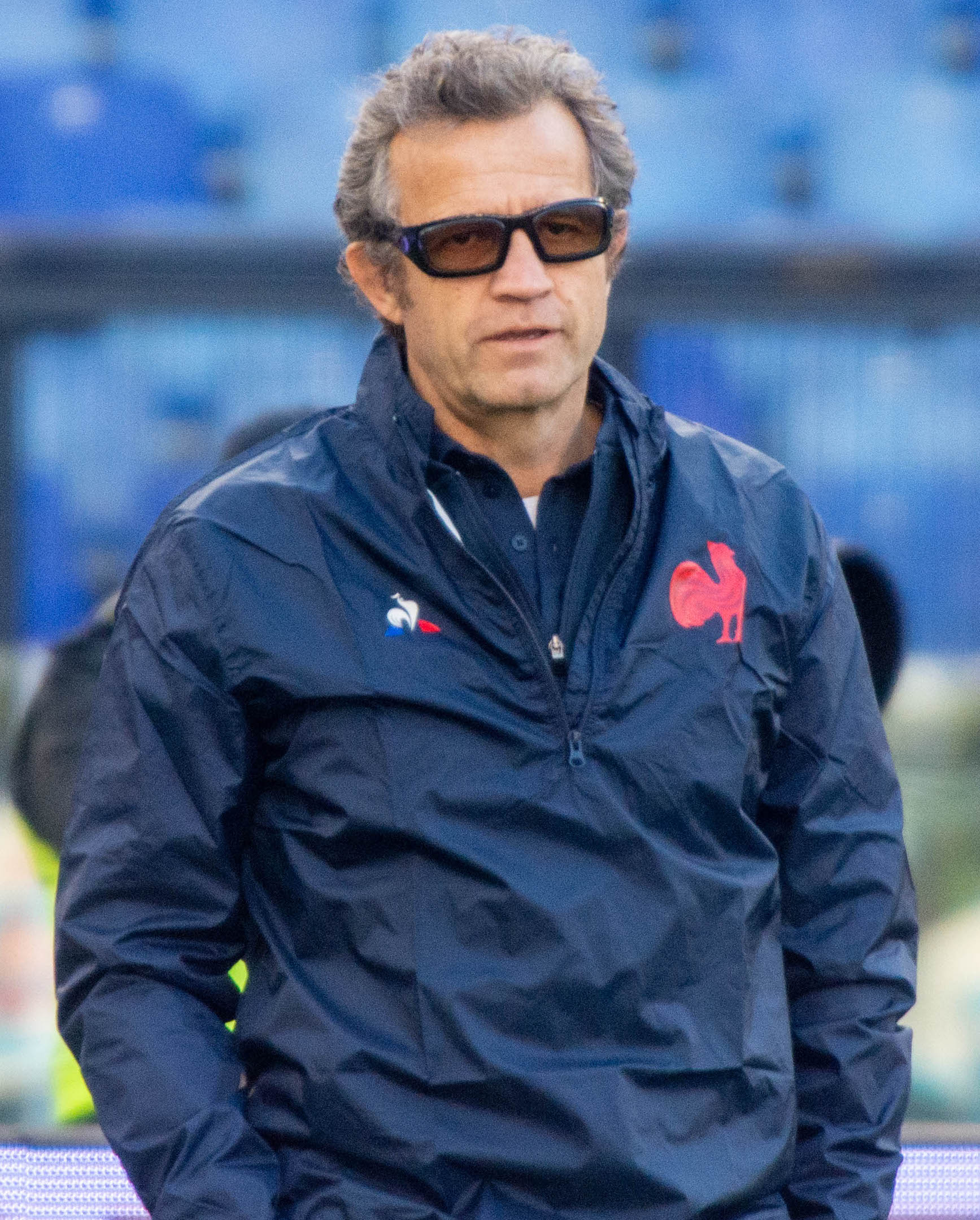
- Galthié with France in 2023
- Born: 20 March 1969 (age 57) Cahors, France
- Height: 1.75 m (5 ft 9 in)
- Weight: 84 kg (13 st 3 lb)

Rugby union career
- Position(s): Scrum-half, Head coach
- Current team: France
Amateur team(s)
Years	Team	Apps	(Points)
1985–1995	Colomiers		
Senior career
Years	Team	Apps	(Points)
1995	Western Province		
1995–2001	Colomiers		
2001–2003	Stade Français	31	(20)
International career
Years	Team	Apps	(Points)
1991–2003	France	64	(49)
Coaching career
- Years: Team
- 2004–2008: Stade Français
- 2010–2014: Montpellier
- 2017–2018: Toulon
- 2019–: France

Fabien Galthié (French pronunciation: [fabjɛ̃ ɡaltie]; born 20 March 1969) is a French rugby union coach and former player, currently the head coach of the France national team.

His usual position was at scrum-half. He played much of his club rugby for Colomiers, and later on in his career, Stade Français. Galthié won 64 caps for France, including playing in four Rugby World Cups, as well as captaining the side at the 2003 World Cup. Former France national coach Bernard Laporte has described him as the greatest scrum-half in French history. He was the IRB International Player of the Year in 2002.

Since retiring as a player, Galthié has coached Stade Français, Montpellier and Toulon in the French Top 14 competition. In 2019 he became an assistant coach of the France national team, and became head coach in 2020. In 2022, he led France to a Six Nations Grand Slam. In 2025, he led France to another Six Nations Championship.

== Playing career ==
Born in Cahors, Galthié began his career at a club in Tournefeuille, before joining Colomiers. He made his international debut for France against Romania in June 1991. He was called into France's 1991 Rugby World Cup squad, replacing the injured Pierre Berbizier. At the 1995 Rugby World Cup he played in the semifinal defeat to South Africa.

Galthié was a crucial member of the French team that upset New Zealand in the semifinal of the 1999 Rugby World Cup at Twickenham. In 2000, Colomiers reached the French championship final, but Galthié had to watch from the stands due to a knee injury. The club lost 28–23 to Stade Français, whom he joined the following season. In 2001 Galthié was appointed captain of France. A successful year in 2002, including a Six Nations Grand Slam, saw France dominate the 2002 IRB Awards, with Galthié named Player of the Year, as well as French coach Bernard Laporte being named Coach of the Year.

Galthié captained France at the 2003 Rugby World Cup in Australia, and secured France's bonus point against Scotland in their third game, scoring the fourth try in the game. He did not play in France's final pool game against the United States. Galthié returned for the next game, the quarterfinal against Ireland which they won convincingly, but in the semi-final they lost to England 24–7. Following their semi-final defeat, France contested the third place play-off with New Zealand. Afterwards Galthié announced his retirement from international rugby.

Galthié won his only club trophy on his last competitive match, the French championship final with Stade Français against Toulouse on 7 June 2003 at Stade de France (32–18).

== Coaching career ==
Galthié became the coach of Stade Français in 2004 after head coach Nick Mallett departed the Paris club. Galthié was contacted by Max Guazzini to take up the coaching job. In the first season, Stade Français made it to the final of both the Top 14 and Heineken Cup finals, but were beaten by Biarritz Olympique and Toulouse respectively. The following season Stade Français were beaten by Toulouse in the Top 14 semi-final, and they were knocked out of the Heineken Cup by Leicester. He eventually won the Top 14 by beating Clermont 23–18 in 2007. He left Stade Français in 2008.

He became a TV pundit with the French public national channel France 2 and private radio Europe 1. He joined the Argentina coaching staff during their end-of-the-year tour of Europe in November and December 2008.

Galthié signed a three-year coaching contract with Montpellier in 2010. Galthié led Montpellier to a Top 14 final in his first year. His stint as coach came to an abrupt end at the end of 2014 due to poor relations with the President of Montpellier Rugby Club. In 2017–2018 he coached Toulon.

=== France ===
In 2019 Galthié was appointed as vice-head coach of the French national team, having been scheduled to succeed Jacques Brunel as head coach in 2020.

==== Statistics ====
As of match played 19 July 2025

Opponent	Played	Won	Drawn	Lost	W%	For	Against	Diff.
Argentina	4	3	0	1	75.00	119	89	+30
Australia	7	5	0	2	71.43	150	128	+22
England	8	5	0	3	62.50	199	142	+57
Fiji (Note: In France's match against Fiji in the Autumn Nations Cup, the match was cancelled and France was awarded an automatic bonus-point victory, or 28–0.)	5	5	0	0	100.000	62	17	+45
Georgia	1	1	0	0	100.00	41	15	+26
Ireland	7	5	0	2	71.43	158	161	–3
Italy (Note: In the opening round of the 2022 Six Nations Championship (against Italy), Galthié, having tested positive for COVID-19, was replaced as coach by Raphaël Ibañez.)	8	7	1	0	87.50	296	105	+191
Japan	5	5	0	0	100.00	149	67	+82
Namibia	1	1	0	0	100.00	96	0	+96
New Zealand	7	3	0	4	42.86	160	170	–10
Scotland	10	6	0	4	60.00	236	192	+44
South Africa	4	2	0	2	50.00	75	87	–12
Uruguay	1	1	0	0	100.00	27	12	+15
Wales	8	8	0	0	100.00	239	135	+104
Opponent	76	57	1	18	73.01	2,007	1,320	+687
Opponent	Played	Won	Drawn	Lost	W%	For	Against	Diff.

== Honours ==
As player

- France
  - Rugby World Cup
    - Runner-up: 1999
    - Third: 1995
    - Fourth: 2003
  - Six Nations Grand Slam
    - Winner: 1997, 1998, 2002
  - Six Nations Championship
    - Winner: 1997, 1998, 2002
- Colomiers Rugby
  - European Challenge Cup
    - Winner: 1998
- Stade Français
  - Top 14
    - Winner: 2003
- Individual
  - World Rugby Men's 15s Player of the Year
    - Winner: 2002

As coach

- Stade Français
  - Top 14
    - Winner: 2007
- Montpellier Hérault rugby
  - Top 14
    - Runner-up: 2011
- France
  - Six Nations Grand Slam
    - Winner: 2022
  - Six Nations Championship
    - Winner: 2022, 2025, 2026
    - Runner-up: 2020, 2021, 2023, 2024
  - Autumn Nations Cup
    - Runner-up: 2020
  - Giuseppe Garibaldi Trophy
    - Winner: 2020, 2021, 2022, 2023, 2025, 2026
  - Dave Gallaher Trophy
    - Winner: 2021, 2024
  - Auld Alliance Trophy
    - Winner: 2022, 2023, 2024, 2025
  - Trophée des Bicentenaires
    - Winner: 2022, 2023, 2025
  - Solidarity Trophy
    - Winner: 2026

== Notes ==
Preceded by (France) Jacques Brunel	France national rugby union team head coach 2019 – Present	Succeeded by Incumbent
