= 2021 end-of-year rugby union internationals =

The 2021 end of year rugby union tests, also referred to as the Autumn internationals in the Northern Hemisphere, were rugby union test matches during October and November 2021, mainly involving countries from the Northern Hemisphere hosting those from the Southern Hemisphere. These international games counted towards World Rugby's ranking system, with teams typically playing from two to four matches in this period.

Matches hosted by teams from the Six Nations Championship were branded the Autumn Nations Series for marketing purposes.

== Fixtures ==
=== 23 October ===
23 October 2021
13:45 JST (UTC+9)

Japan	23–32	Australia
Try: Lemeki 26' c Nakamura 56' c Con: Matsuda (1/1) 27'; Tamura (1/1) 57'; Pen: Matsuda (2/2) 16', 33'; Tamura (1/1) 74'	Report	Try: Wright 7' c Petaia 22' c Tupou 43' m Leota 52' m McInerney 79' m Con: Cooper (2/4) 9', 24'; Pen: Cooper (1/2) 41'

Oita Stadium, Oita
Attendance: 17,004
Referee: Paul Williams (New Zealand)

Team details

FB	15	Semisi Masirewa		(substituted off) 48'
RW	14	Lomano Lemeki	(yellow card) 50' to 58'	(substituted off) 58'
OC	13	Timothy Lafaele
IC	12	Ryoto Nakamura
LW	11	Siosaia Fifita
FH	10	Rikiya Matsuda
SH	9	Yutaka Nagare		(substituted off) 63'
N8	8	Kazuki Himeno		(substituted off) 70'
OF	7	Lappies Labuschagné (c)
BF	6	Ben Gunter		(substituted off) 49'
RL	5	James Moore
LL	4	Jack Cornelsen
TP	3	Koo Ji-won		(substituted off) 70'
HK	2	Atsushi Sakate		(substituted off) 70'
LP	1	Keita Inagaki		(substituted off) 48'
Replacements:
HK	16	Yusuke Niwai		(substituted on) 70'
PR	17	Craig Millar		(substituted on) 48'
PR	18	Asaeli Ai Valu		(substituted on) 70'
FL	19	Yoshitaka Tokunaga		(substituted on) 49'
N8	20	Tevita Tatafu		(substituted on) 70'
SH	21	Naoto Saito		(substituted on) 63'
FH	22	Yu Tamura		(substituted on) 48'
CE	23	Dylan Riley		(substituted on) 58'
Coach:
(New Zealand) Jamie Joseph

FB	15	Reece Hodge	(substituted off) 14'
RW	14	Tom Wright
OC	13	Len Ikitau
IC	12	Hunter Paisami
LW	11	Andrew Kellaway
FH	10	Quade Cooper	(substituted off) 75'
SH	9	Nic White	(substituted off) 63'
N8	8	Rob Valetini
OF	7	Michael Hooper (c)
BF	6	Rob Leota	(substituted off) 57'
RL	5	Matt Philip	(substituted off) 53'
LL	4	Izack Rodda
TP	3	Taniela Tupou	(substituted off) 53'
HK	2	Folau Fainga'a	(substituted off) 70'
LP	1	James Slipper	(substituted off) 53'
Replacements:
HK	16	Connal McInerney	(substituted on) 70'
PR	17	Angus Bell	(substituted on) 53'
PR	18	Allan Alaalatoa	(substituted on) 53'
LK	19	Darcy Swain	(substituted on) 53'
FL	20	Pete Samu	(substituted on) 57'
SH	21	Tate McDermott	(substituted on) 63'
FH	22	James O'Connor	(substituted on) 75'
CE	23	Jordan Petaia	(substituted on) 14'
Coach:
(New Zealand) Dave Rennie

Assistant referees:
Takehito Namekawa (Japan)
Shuhei Kubo (Japan)
Television match official:
Brendon Pickerill (New Zealand)

Notes:

- Ben Gunter, Dylan Riley (both Japan) and Connal McInerney (Australia) made their international debuts.
- Yoshitaka Tokunaga replaced Michael Leitch on the bench for Japan, after Leitch withdrew due to injury.

23 October 2021
15:30 EDT (UTC−4)

United States	14–104	New Zealand
Try: Augspurger 40' c Matyas 53' c Con: Carty (2/2) 40+1', 53'	Report	Try: Jacobson (2) 1' c, 21' c De Groot 6' c Jordan (3) 10' m, 30' m, 70' c McKenzie 13' c Mo'unga 25' c Ta'avao (2) 34' c, 41' c Tupaea 37' c Papalii 48' c Lienert-Brown 55' m B. Barrett 67' c Coles 79' m Perenara 80+2' c Con: Mo'unga (9/12) 1', 6', 13', 21', 25', 34', 37', 41', 48'; McKenzie (3/4) 68', 72', 80+3'

FedExField, Washington
Attendance: 39,720
Referee: Angus Gardner (Australia)

Team details

FB	15	Will Hooley
RW	14	Ryan James	(substituted off) 40'
OC	13	Tavite Lopeti
IC	12	Bryce Campbell (c)
LW	11	Ryan Matyas	(substituted off) 56'
FH	10	Luke Carty
SH	9	Nate Augspurger
N8	8	Cam Dolan	(substituted off) 44'
OF	7	Hanco Germishuys	(substituted off) 69'
BF	6	Benjamín Bonasso
RL	5	Nick Civetta
LL	4	Nate Brakeley	(substituted off) 56'
TP	3	Paul Mullen	(substituted off) 74'
HK	2	Dylan Fawsitt	(substituted off) 50'
LP	1	Matt Harmon	(substituted off) 58'
Replacements:
HK	16	Chad Gough	(substituted on) 50'
PR	17	Fakaʻosi Pifeleti	(substituted on) 58'
PR	18	Dino Waldren	(substituted on) 74'
LK	19	Siaosi Mahoni	(substituted on) 56'
FL	20	Moni Tonga’uiha	(substituted on) 44'
FL	21	Andrew Guerra	(substituted on) 69'	(substituted off) 78'
SH	22	Michael Baska	(substituted on) 56'
FH	23	Mike Dabulas	(substituted on) 40'
Coach:
(South Africa) Gary Gold

FB	15	Damian McKenzie
RW	14	Will Jordan
OC	13	Braydon Ennor
IC	12	Quinn Tupaea
LW	11	George Bridge	(substituted off) 54'
FH	10	Richie Mo'unga	(substituted off) 58'
SH	9	Finlay Christie	(substituted off) 54'
N8	8	Hoskins Sotutu
OF	7	Dalton Papalii	(substituted off) 50'
BF	6	Luke Jacobson
RL	5	Sam Whitelock (c)	(substituted off) 58'
LL	4	Tupou Vaa'i
TP	3	Angus Ta'avao	(substituted off) 50'
HK	2	Asafo Aumua	(substituted off) 50'
LP	1	Ethan de Groot	(substituted off) 50'
Replacements:
HK	16	Dane Coles	(substituted on) 50'
PR	17	George Bower	(substituted on) 50'
PR	18	Tyrel Lomax	(substituted on) 50'
LK	19	Josh Lord	(substituted on) 58'
FL	20	Sam Cane	(substituted on) 50'
SH	21	TJ Perenara	(substituted on) 54'
FH	22	Beauden Barrett	(substituted on) 58'
CE	23	Anton Lienert-Brown	(substituted on) 54'
Coach:
(New Zealand) Ian Foster

Assistant Referees:
Moe Chaudhry (Canada)
Scott Green (United States)
Television match official:
Brett Cronan (Australia)

Notes:

- Chad Gough, Ryan James, Fakaʻosi Pifeleti (all United States) and Josh Lord (New Zealand) made their international debuts.
- New Zealand recorded their biggest win over the United States.
- This was the first time New Zealand scored 100 or more points in multiple games in the same calendar year, having scored 102 against Tonga in June.

=== 30 October ===
30 October 2021
14:30 BST (UTC+1)

Scotland	60–14	Tonga
Try: McLean (2) 7' c, 15' c Steyn (4) 22' m, 32' m, 39' m, 80+1' c Schoeman 29' c Turner 50' m Haining 71' m Kebble 76' c Con: Kinghorn (3/7) 8', 17', 30'; Thompson (2/3) 77', 80+2'	Report	Try: Lolohea 59' m Pen: Faiva (3/3) 13', 20', 27'

Murrayfield Stadium, Edinburgh
Attendance: 32,371
Referee: Nic Berry (Australia)

Team details

FB	15	Darcy Graham		(substituted off) 61'
RW	14	Kyle Steyn
OC	13	Sione Tuipulotu
IC	12	Sam Johnson
LW	11	Rufus McLean		(substituted off) 64'
FH	10	Blair Kinghorn
SH	9	Ali Price (cc)		(substituted off) 58'
N8	8	Matt Fagerson		(substituted off) 51'
OF	7	Hamish Watson		(substituted off) 40'
BF	6	Jamie Ritchie (cc)
RL	5	Rob Harley	(yellow card) 57' to 67'
LL	4	Jamie Hodgson
TP	3	Zander Fagerson		(substituted off) 51'
HK	2	George Turner		(substituted off) 51'
LP	1	Pierre Schoeman		(substituted off) 51'
Replacements:
HK	16	Stuart McInally		(substituted on) 51'
PR	17	Jamie Bhatti		(substituted on) 51'
PR	18	Oli Kebble		(substituted on) 51'
LK	19	Marshall Sykes		(substituted on) 64'
FL	20	Luke Crosbie		(substituted on) 40'
N8	21	Nick Haining		(substituted on) 51'
SH	22	Jamie Dobie		(substituted on) 58'
FH	23	Ross Thompson		(substituted on) 61'
Coach:
(Scotland) Gregor Townsend

FB	15	James Faiva
RW	14	Atu Manu
OC	13	Mali Hingano
IC	12	Vaea Vaea		(substituted off) 49'
LW	11	Walter Fifita
FH	10	Kurt Morath		(substituted off) 49'
SH	9	Sonatane Takulua (c)
N8	8	Valentino Mapapalangi		(substituted off) 54'
OF	7	Fotu Lokotui		(substituted off) 61'
BF	6	Tanginoa Halaifonua
RL	5	Setefano Funaki		(substituted off) 70'
LL	4	Leva Fifita
TP	3	David Lolohea		(substituted off) 72'
HK	2	Maile Ngauamo		(substituted off) 31'
LP	1	Loni Uhila		(substituted off) 49'
Replacements:
HK	16	Siua Maile		(substituted on) 31'
PR	17	Jethro Felemi		(substituted on) 49'
PR	18	Toma'akino Taufa		(substituted on) 72'
LK	19	Daniel Faleafa		(substituted on) 70'
FL	20	Onehunga Havili		(substituted on) 54'
FL	21	Mateaki Kafatolu		(substituted on) 61'
SH	22	Aisea Halo	(yellow card) 64' to 75'	(substituted on) 49'
FH	23	Navarre Haisila		(substituted on) 49'
Caretaker coaches:
(Australia) Grant Doorey (New Zealand) John McKee

Player of the Match:
Kyle Steyn (Scotland)

Assistant referees:
Damon Murphy (Australia)
Angus Gardner (Australia)
Television match official:
Brett Cronan (Australia)

Notes:

- Luke Crosbie, Jamie Dobie, Jamie Hodgson, Rufus McLean, Pierre Schoeman, Marshall Sykes, Ross Thompson, Sione Tuipulotu (all Scotland), Setefano Funaki, Navarre Haisila, Tanginoa Halaifonua, Atu Manu, Maile Ngauamo, Loni Uhila and Vaea Vaea (all Tonga) made their international debuts.
- Scotland recorded their biggest win over Tonga, surpassing the 36-point difference set during the 1995 Rugby World Cup.
- Kyle Steyn became the first Scottish player to score four tries at Murrayfield and the first since Gavin Hastings against Ivory Coast at the 1995 Rugby World Cup.
- Tonga played at Murrayfield for the first time since 2001.

30 October 2021
16:45 CEST (UTC+2)

Spain	11–13	Italy A
Try: Bell 47' m Pen: Güemes (2/2) 12', 71'	Report	Try: Marin 61'; Con: Marin (1/1) 62'; Pen: Marin (2/2) 52', 64'

Estadio Nacional Complutense, Madrid
Attendance: 4,000
Referee: Frank Murphy (Ireland)

30 October 2021
17:15 BST (UTC+1)

Wales	16–54	New Zealand
Try: J. Williams 61' c Con: Priestland (1/1) 61'; Pen: Anscombe (2/2) 6', 40+3'; Priestland (1/1) 52'	Report	Try: B. Barrett (2) 4' c, 79' m Perenara 34' m Jordan 54' c Papalii 64' c Reece 66' c Lienert-Brown 71' c Con: J. Barrett (5/7) 4', 56', 65', 68', 73'; Pen: J. Barrett (3/4) 18', 26', 46'

Millennium Stadium, Cardiff
Attendance: 74,500
Referee: Mathieu Raynal (France)

Team details

FB	15	Johnny McNicholl
RW	14	Owen Lane
OC	13	Jonathan Davies
IC	12	Johnny Williams	(substituted off) 68'
LW	11	Josh Adams
FH	10	Gareth Anscombe	(substituted off) 47'
SH	9	Tomos Williams	(substituted off) 65'
N8	8	Aaron Wainwright
OF	7	Taine Basham
BF	6	Ross Moriarty	(substituted off) 39'
RL	5	Alun Wyn Jones (c)	(substituted off) 19'
LL	4	Adam Beard
TP	3	Tomas Francis	(substituted off) 56'
HK	2	Ryan Elias	(substituted off) 65'
LP	1	Wyn Jones	(substituted off) 56'
Replacements:
HK	16	Kirby Myhill	(substituted on) 65'
PR	17	Rhys Carré	(substituted on) 56'
PR	18	Dillon Lewis	(substituted on) 56'
LK	19	Will Rowlands	(substituted on) 19'
FL	20	Seb Davies	(substituted on) 39'
SH	21	Gareth Davies	(substituted on) 65'
FH	22	Rhys Priestland	(substituted on) 47'
CE	23	Ben Thomas	(substituted on) 68'
Coach:
(New Zealand) Wayne Pivac

FB	15	Jordie Barrett
RW	14	Will Jordan		(substituted off) 68'
OC	13	Anton Lienert-Brown
IC	12	David Havili		(substituted off) 62'
LW	11	Rieko Ioane
FH	10	Beauden Barrett
SH	9	TJ Perenara		(substituted off) 62'
N8	8	Ardie Savea
OF	7	Dalton Papalii		(substituted off) 65'
BF	6	Ethan Blackadder		(substituted off) 41'	(substituted on) 48'
RL	5	Sam Whitelock (c)
LL	4	Brodie Retallick		(substituted off) 60'
TP	3	Nepo Laulala	(yellow card) 39' to 48'			(substituted off) 62'
HK	2	Codie Taylor		(substituted off) 62'
LP	1	Joe Moody		(substituted off) 62'
Replacements:
HK	16	Samisoni Taukei'aho		(substituted on) 62'
PR	17	Karl Tu'inukuafe		(substituted on) 62'
PR	18	Tyrel Lomax		(substituted on) 41'	(substituted off) 48'	(substituted on) 62'
LK	19	Tupou Vaa'i		(substituted on) 60'
FL	20	Akira Ioane		(substituted on) 65'
SH	21	Brad Weber		(substituted on) 62'
FH	22	Richie Mo'unga		(substituted on) 68'
WG	23	Sevu Reece		(substituted on) 62'
Coach:
(New Zealand) Ian Foster

Player of the Match:
Beauden Barrett (New Zealand)

Assistant referees:
Karl Dickson (England)
Christophe Ridley (England)
Television match official:
Brian MacNeice (Ireland)

Notes:

- Ken Owens (Wales) was named to start but withdrew shortly after the team announcement after failing a late fitness test; Ryan Elias replaced Owens in the starting XV and Kirby Myhill took Elias's place on the bench.
- Alun Wyn Jones (Wales) earned his 149th test cap to become the most capped international player (excluding Lions tests), surpassing Richie McCaw's record.
- Kirby Myhill (Wales) made his international debut.
- Beauden Barrett became the 11th New Zealand player to earn 100 test caps.
- New Zealand's 54 points scored were the most they had scored away to Wales, and the 38-point margin equalled New Zealand's largest winning margin when away to Wales.

30 October 2021
17:00 PDT (UTC−7)

United States	Cancelled	Ireland

Allegiant Stadium, Las Vegas

=== 6/7 November ===
6 November 2021
13:00 WET (UTC+0)

Ireland	60–5	Japan
Try: Lowe 4' c Conway (3) 11' c, 19' m, 74' m Gibson-Park 34' c Sexton 48' c Aki 55' m Ringrose 70' c Healy 80+1' c Con: Sexton (4/6) 6', 13', 36', 50'; Carbery (2/3) 71', 80+2'; Pen: Sexton (1/1) 24'	Report	Try: Fifita 57' m

Aviva Stadium, Dublin
Attendance: 40,000
Referee: Nika Amashukeli (Georgia)

Team details

FB	15	Hugo Keenan
RW	14	Andrew Conway
OC	13	Garry Ringrose
IC	12	Bundee Aki	(substituted off) 67'
LW	11	James Lowe
FH	10	Johnny Sexton (c)	(substituted off) 62'
SH	9	Jamison Gibson-Park	(substituted off) 58'
N8	8	Jack Conan
OF	7	Josh van der Flier	(substituted off) 51'
BF	6	Caelan Doris
RL	5	James Ryan
LL	4	Tadhg Beirne	(substituted off) 58'
TP	3	Tadhg Furlong	(substituted off) 55'
HK	2	Rónan Kelleher	(substituted off) 55'
LP	1	Andrew Porter	(substituted off) 5'
Replacements:
HK	16	Dan Sheehan	(substituted on) 55'
PR	17	Cian Healy	(substituted on) 55'
PR	18	Finlay Bealham	(substituted on) 55'
LK	19	Iain Henderson	(substituted on) 58'
FL	20	Peter O'Mahony	(substituted on) 51'
SH	21	Conor Murray	(substituted on) 58'
FH	22	Joey Carbery	(substituted on) 62'
WG	23	Keith Earls	(substituted on) 67'
Coach:
(England) Andy Farrell

FB	15	Kotaro Matsushima
RW	14	Dylan Riley
OC	13	Timothy Lafaele		(substituted off) 39'	(substituted on) 40'		(substituted off) 67'
IC	12	Ryoto Nakamura				(substituted off) 56'	(substituted on) 67'
LW	11	Siosaia Fifita
FH	10	Yu Tamura		(substituted off) 45'	(substituted on) 51'	(substituted off) 56'
SH	9	Yutaka Nagare		(substituted off) 56'
N8	8	Kazuki Himeno
OF	7	Lappies Labuschagné (c)
BF	6	Ben Gunter		(substituted off) 27'
RL	5	James Moore
LL	4	Jack Cornelsen
TP	3	Koo Ji-won		(substituted off) 40'
HK	2	Atsushi Sakate	(yellow card) 45' to 51'	(substituted off) 64'
LP	1	Keita Inagaki		(substituted off) 40'
Replacements:
HK	16	Yusuke Niwai		(substituted on) 45'	(substituted off) 51'	(substituted on) 64'
PR	17	Craig Millar		(substituted on) 40'
PR	18	Asaeli Ai Valu		(substituted on) 40'
FL	19	Yoshitaka Tokunaga		(substituted on) 27'	(substituted off) 59'
N8	20	Tevita Tatafu			(substituted on) 59'
SH	21	Naoto Saito		(substituted on) 56'
FH	22	Rikiya Matsuda		(substituted on) 56'
FB	23	Ryohei Yamanaka		(substituted on) 39'	(substituted off) 40'	(substituted on) 56'
Coach:
(New Zealand) Jamie Joseph

Player of the Match:
Jack Conan (Ireland)

Assistant referees:
Damon Murphy (Australia)
Pierre Brousset (France)
Television match official:
Eric Gauzins (France)

Notes:

- Dan Sheehan (Ireland) made his international debut.
- Johnny Sexton became the seventh Ireland player to earn his 100th test cap.

6 November 2021
14:00 CET (UTC+1)

Italy	9–47	New Zealand
Pen: Garbisi (3/3) 37', 40+2', 57'	Report	Try: Christie 28' c Coles (2) 31' c, 39' c Reece 63' c Aumua (2) 69' c, 76' m Sotutu 71' c Con: Mo'unga (6/7) 29', 32', 40', 64', 69', 72'

Stadio Olimpico, Rome
Attendance: 28,956
Referee: Karl Dickson (England)

Team details

FB	15	Matteo Minozzi
RW	14	Federico Mori
OC	13	Ignacio Brex
IC	12	Marco Zanon
LW	11	Monty Ioane
FH	10	Paolo Garbisi	(substituted off) 61'
SH	9	Stephen Varney	(substituted off) 53'
N8	8	Renato Giammarioli	(substituted off) 46'
OF	7	Michele Lamaro (c)
BF	6	Sebastian Negri
RL	5	Dave Sisi	(substituted off) 61'
LL	4	Marco Fuser	(substituted off) 46'
TP	3	Marco Riccioni	(substituted off) 26'	(substituted on) 33'	(substituted off) 62'
HK	2	Gianmarco Lucchesi	(substituted off) 53'
LP	1	Danilo Fischetti	(substituted off) 46'
Replacements:
HK	16	Luca Bigi	(substituted on) 53'
PR	17	Ivan Nemer	(substituted on) 46'
PR	18	Pietro Ceccarelli	(substituted on) 26'	(substituted off) 33'	(substituted on) 62'
LK	19	Niccolò Cannone	(substituted on) 46'
LK	20	Federico Ruzza	(substituted on) 61'
N8	21	Braam Steyn	(substituted on) 46'
SH	22	Callum Braley	(substituted on) 53'
FH	23	Carlo Canna	(substituted on) 61'
Coach:
(New Zealand) Kieran Crowley

FB	15	Damian McKenzie
RW	14	Sevu Reece	(substituted off) 67'
OC	13	Braydon Ennor	(substituted off) 58'
IC	12	Quinn Tupaea
LW	11	George Bridge
FH	10	Richie Mo'unga
SH	9	Brad Weber	(substituted off) 9'
N8	8	Hoskins Sotutu
OF	7	Sam Cane (c)
BF	6	Luke Jacobson	(substituted off) 52'
RL	5	Josh Lord	(substituted off) 61'
LL	4	Tupou Vaa'i
TP	3	Tyrel Lomax	(substituted off) 52'
HK	2	Dane Coles	(substituted off) 52'
LP	1	George Bower	(substituted off) 52'
Replacements:
HK	16	Asafo Aumua	(substituted on) 52'
PR	17	Ethan de Groot	(substituted on) 52'
PR	18	Ofa Tu'ungafasi	(substituted on) 52'
LK	19	Sam Whitelock	(substituted on) 61'
FL	20	Shannon Frizell	(substituted on) 52'
SH	21	Finlay Christie	(substituted on) 9'
CE	22	David Havili	(substituted on) 58'
FB	23	Jordie Barrett	(substituted on) 67'
Coach:
(New Zealand) Ian Foster

Player of the Match:
Dane Coles (New Zealand)

Assistant referees:
Mike Adamson (Scotland)
Sam Grove-White (Scotland)
Television match official:
Tom Foley (England)

Notes:

- Ivan Nemer (Italy) made his international debut.
- New Zealand broke the record for the most points scored in a calendar year (675), surpassing the 658 points scored by South Africa in 2007.

6 November 2021
15:00 WET (UTC+0)

Portugal	20–17	Canada
Try: Appleton 4' c Storti 52' m Pinto 78' m Con: Guedes (1/2) 5'; Pen: Guedes (1/1) 39'	Report	Try: Keith 22' m Thomas (2) 65' m, 70' c Con: Povey (1/3) 71'

CAR Rugby do Jamor, Lisbon
Attendance: 0
Referee: Frank Murphy (Ireland)

Team details

FB	15	Nuno Sousa Guedes	(substituted off) 63'
RW	14	Raffaele Storti
OC	13	José Lima
IC	12	Tomás Appleton (c)
LW	11	Rodrigo Marta
FH	10	Jerónimo Portela	(substituted off) 71'
SH	9	Pedro Lucas	(substituted off) 45'
N8	8	Thibault de Freitas	(substituted off) 59'
OF	7	David Wallis
BF	6	Rafael Simões
RL	5	Duarte Torgal
LL	4	José Madeira	(substituted off) 66'
TP	3	Diogo Ferreira	(substituted off) 72'
HK	2	Duarte Diniz	(substituted off) 72'
LP	1	David Costa	(substituted off) 63'
Replacements:
PR	16	André Arrojado	(substituted on) 63'
HK	17	Loïc Bournonville	(substituted on) 72'
PR	18	Francisco Bruno	(substituted on) 72'
LK	19	Eric dos Santos	(substituted on) 66'
FL	20	Manuel Picão	(substituted on) 59'
SH	21	João Belo	(substituted on) 45'
FH	22	Jorge Abecassis	(substituted on) 71'
FB	23	Manuel Cardoso Pinto	(substituted on) 63'
Coach:
(France) Patrice Lagisquet

FB	15	Robbie Povey
RW	14	Brock Webster
OC	13	Ben LeSage
IC	12	Quinn Ngawati
LW	11	Kainoa Lloyd
FH	10	Spencer Jones
SH	9	Ross Braude	(substituted off) 68'
N8	8	Siaki Vikilani	(substituted off) 44'
OF	7	Michael Smith
BF	6	Lucas Rumball (c)
RL	5	Kyle Baillie	(substituted off) 63'
LL	4	Conor Keys
TP	3	Jake Ilnicki
HK	2	Andrew Quattrin	(substituted off) 59'
LP	1	Cole Keith	(substituted off) 60'
Replacements:
HK	16	Eric Howard	(substituted on) 59'
PR	17	Djustice Sears-Duru	(substituted on) 60'
PR	18	Foster DeWitt
LK	19	Corey Thomas	(substituted on) 44'
LK	20	Josh Larsen	(substituted on) 63'
SH	21	Jason Higgins	(substituted on) 68'
CE	22	Lockie Kratz
WG	23	Isaac Olson
Coach:
(Wales) Kingsley Jones

Assistant referees:
Ben Blain (Scotland)
Adam Leal (England)

Notes:

- Peter Nelson (Canada) was named to start but withdrew after the captain's run and was replaced by Robbie Povey, who was replaced on the bench by Lockie Kratz. Tyler Rowland was also named on the bench but withdrew due to injury and was replaced by Foster DeWitt.
- André Arrojado (Portugal) made his international debut.
- This was Portugal's first win over Canada.

6 November 2021
16:00 CET (UTC+1)

Spain	13–43	Fiji
Try: Mora 3' c Con: Güemes (1/1) 3'; Pen: Güemes (2/3) 9', 34'		Try: Kunavula 12' m Tuicuvu 25' c Nayacalevu 43' c Ravai 47' c Tuimaba 57' m Matavesi 65' c Tuisova 74' m Con: Volavola (4/7) 26', 43', 47', 66'

Estadio Nacional Complutense, Madrid
Attendance: 6,000
Referee: Jaco Peyper (South Africa)

Team details

FB	15	J. W. Bell
RW	14	Joan Losada	(substituted off) 69'
OC	13	Richard Stewart
IC	12	Álvar Gimeno
LW	11	Jordi Jorba	(substituted off) 52'
FH	10	Bautista Güemes
SH	9	Kerman Aurrekoetxea	(substituted off) 55'
N8	8	Facundo Domínguez	(substituted off) 55'
OF	7	Mathew Foulds
BF	6	Kalokalo Gavidi
RL	5	Victor Sánchez	(substituted off) 47'
LL	4	Manuel Mora
TP	3	Alberto Blanco	(substituted off) 27'	(substituted on) 76'
HK	2	Santiago Ovejero	(substituted off) 34'
LP	1	Fernando López (c)	(substituted off) 32'
Replacements:
PR	16	Thierry Futeu	(substituted on) 32'
HK	17	Pablo Miejimolle	(substituted on) 34'
PR	18	Andres Alvarado	(substituted on) 27'	(substituted off) 76'
LK	19	Anibal Bonán	(substituted on) 55'
FL	20	Brice Ferrer	(substituted on) 47'
SH	21	Facundo Munilla	(substituted on) 55'
FB	22	Federico Casteglioni	(substituted on) 52'
WG	23	Jerry Davoibaravi	(substituted on) 69'
Coach:
(Spain) Santiago Santos

FB	15	Seta Tuicuvu
RW	14	Jiuta Wainiqolo	(substituted off) 10'
OC	13	Waisea Nayacalevu (c)
IC	12	Vilimoni Botitu
LW	11	Aminiasi Tuimaba	(substituted off) 67'
FH	10	Ben Volavola
SH	9	Nikola Matawalu
N8	8	Albert Tuisue	(substituted off) 50'
OF	7	Mesu Kunavula	(substituted off) 55'
BF	6	Leone Nakarawa
RL	5	Temo Mayanavanua
LL	4	Tevita Ratuva	(substituted off) 57'
TP	3	Mesake Doge	(substituted off) 62'
HK	2	Sam Matavesi	(substituted off) 72'
LP	1	Eroni Mawi	(substituted off) 45'
Replacements:
HK	16	Henry Spring	(substituted on) 72'
PR	17	Peni Ravai	(substituted on) 45'
PR	18	Lee-Roy Atalifo	(substituted on) 62'
LK	19	Api Ratuniyarawa	(substituted on) 57'
N8	20	Viliame Mata	(substituted on) 50'
FL	21	Masivesi Dakuwaqa	(substituted on) 55'
WG	22	Josua Tuisova	(substituted on) 10'
WG	23	Eroni Sau	(substituted on) 67'
Caretaker coach:
(Wales) Gareth Baber

Assistant referees:
Ludovic Cayre (France)
Chris Busby (Ireland)
Television match official:
Alan Falzone (Italy)

Notes:

- Jerry Davoibaravi, Santiago Ovejero (both Spain), Vilimoni Botitu, Masivesi Dakuwaqa, Henry Spring, Aminiasi Tuimaba and Jiuta Wainiqolo (all Fiji) made their international debuts.
- Fiji became Spain's highest-ranked opponent at home since Spain hosted Australia in 2001.

6 November 2021
15:15 GMT (UTC+0)

England	69–3	Tonga
Try: Radwan 3' m George (2) 13' m, 70' c May (2) 29' c, 60' c Itoje 33' c Youngs (2) 40+1' m, 51' m Smith 73' c Blamire 78' c Mitchell 80' c Con: Slade (2/6) 30', 34'; Smith (5/5) 61', 71', 74', 79', 80+1'	Report	Pen: Takulua (1/2) 19'

Twickenham Stadium, London
Attendance: 81,022
Referee: Craig Evans (Wales)

Team details

FB	15	Freddie Steward
RW	14	Adam Radwan
OC	13	Henry Slade
IC	12	Manu Tuilagi	(substituted off) 58'
LW	11	Jonny May
FH	10	George Furbank	(substituted off) 52'
SH	9	Ben Youngs	(substituted off) 67'
N8	8	Tom Curry
OF	7	Sam Underhill	(substituted off) 40'
BF	6	Courtney Lawes (c)	(substituted off) 62'
RL	5	Jonny Hill
LL	4	Maro Itoje
TP	3	Kyle Sinckler	(substituted off) 67'
HK	2	Jamie George	(substituted off) 71'
LP	1	Ellis Genge	(substituted off) 67'
Replacements:
HK	16	Jamie Blamire	(substituted on) 71'
PR	17	Joe Marler	(substituted on) 67'
PR	18	Will Stuart	(substituted on) 67'
LK	19	Charlie Ewels	(substituted on) 62'
N8	20	Alex Dombrandt	(substituted on) 40'
SH	21	Alex Mitchell	(substituted on) 67'
FH	22	Marcus Smith	(substituted on) 52'
CE	23	Mark Atkinson	(substituted on) 58'
Coach:
(Australia) Eddie Jones

FB	15	Telusa Veainu
RW	14	Walter Fifita	(yellow card) 46' to 56'	(substituted off) 56'
OC	13	Mali Hingano
IC	12	Afusipa Taumoepeau
LW	11	Solomone Kata	(yellow card) 32' to 40'
FH	10	Kurt Morath		(substituted off) 65'
SH	9	Sonatane Takulua (c)		(substituted off) 69'
N8	8	Sione Vailanu
OF	7	Mateaki Kafatolu		(substituted off) 62'
BF	6	Lopeti Timani		(substituted off) 69'
RL	5	Tanginoa Halaifonua
LL	4	Leva Fifita
TP	3	Ben Tameifuna		(substituted off) 58'
HK	2	Paul Ngauamo		(substituted off) 56'
LP	1	Siegfried Fisiihoi		(substituted off) 58'
Replacements:
HK	16	Siua Maile		(substituted on) 56'
PR	17	Loni Uhila		(substituted on) 58'
PR	18	Maʻafu Fia		(substituted on) 58'
LK	19	Setefano Funaki		(substituted on) 69'
FL	20	Onehunga Havili		(substituted on) 62'
SH	21	Leon Fukofuka		(substituted on) 69'
FH	22	James Faiva		(substituted on) 65'
WG	23	Viliami Fine	(red card) 69'	(substituted on) 56'
Caretaker coaches:
(Australia) Grant Doorey (New Zealand) John McKee

Player of the Match:
Henry Slade (England)

Assistant referees:
Adam Jones (Wales)
Andrea Piardi (Italy)
Television match official:
Ben Whitehouse (Wales)

Notes:

- Owen Farrell was initially named to start at fly-half but was ruled out before the match after a positive COVID-19 test; George Furbank replaced Farrell at fly-half, and Mark Atkinson took Furbank's place among the replacements.
- Mark Atkinson, Alex Mitchell (both England), Solomone Kata and Afusipa Taumoepeau (both Tonga) made their international debuts.
- Lopeti Timani (Tonga) made his Tongan international debut having previously represented Australia.

6 November 2021
17:30 GMT (UTC+0)

Wales	18–23	South Africa
Pen: Biggar (6/6) 10', 14', 27', 32', 51', 65'	Report	Try: Marx 73' m Pen: Pollard (4/4) 12', 18', 40+2', 60'; Steyn (1/1) 55'; E. Jantjies (1/1) 80+1'

Millennium Stadium, Cardiff
Attendance: 70,353
Referee: Paul Williams (New Zealand)

Team details

FB	15	Johnny McNicholl
RW	14	Louis Rees-Zammit
OC	13	Jonathan Davies (c)		(substituted off) 60'	(substituted on) 79'
IC	12	Nick Tompkins			(substituted off) 79'
LW	11	Josh Adams
FH	10	Dan Biggar		(substituted off) 69'
SH	9	Tomos Williams		(substituted off) 69'
N8	8	Aaron Wainwright		(substituted off) 55'
OF	7	Taine Basham
BF	6	Ellis Jenkins		(substituted off) 42'	(substituted on) 46'	(substituted off) 79'
RL	5	Adam Beard
LL	4	Will Rowlands
TP	3	Tomas Francis		(substituted off) 60'
HK	2	Ryan Elias		(substituted off) 71'
LP	1	Rhys Carré	(yellow card) 36' to 46'			(substituted off) 69'
Replacements:
HK	16	Bradley Roberts		(substituted on) 71'
PR	17	Wyn Jones		(substituted on) 42'	(substituted off) 46'	(substituted on) 69'
PR	18	WillGriff John		(substituted on) 60'
LK	19	Ben Carter				(substituted on) 79'
N8	20	Seb Davies		(substituted on) 55'
SH	21	Gareth Davies		(substituted on) 69'
FH	22	Gareth Anscombe		(substituted on) 69'
FB	23	Liam Williams		(substituted on) 60'
Coach:
(New Zealand) Wayne Pivac

FB	15	Damian Willemse		(substituted off) 14'
RW	14	Jesse Kriel
OC	13	Lukhanyo Am
IC	12	Damian de Allende
LW	11	Makazole Mapimpi
FH	10	Handré Pollard		(substituted off) 66'
SH	9	Herschel Jantjies		(substituted off) 55'
N8	8	Duane Vermeulen
BF	7	Kwagga Smith
OF	6	Siya Kolisi (c)		(substituted off) 71'
RL	5	Lood de Jager		(substituted off) 60'
LL	4	Eben Etzebeth
TP	3	Trevor Nyakane		(substituted off) 46'
HK	2	Bongi Mbonambi		(substituted off) 46'
LP	1	Ox Nché	(yellow card) 31' to 40'	(substituted off) 46'
Replacements:
HK	16	Malcolm Marx		(substituted on) 46'
PR	17	Steven Kitshoff		(substituted on) 46'
PR	18	Vincent Koch		(substituted on) 46'
LK	19	Franco Mostert		(substituted on) 60'
N8	20	Jasper Wiese		(substituted on) 71'
SH	21	Cobus Reinach		(substituted on) 55'
FH	22	Elton Jantjies		(substituted on) 66'
CE	23	François Steyn		(substituted on) 14'
Coach:
(South Africa) Jacques Nienaber

Player of the Match:
François Steyn (South Africa)

Assistant referees:
Andrew Brace (Ireland)
James Doleman (New Zealand)
Television match official:
Olly Hodges (Ireland)

Notes:

- WillGriff John and Bradley Roberts (Wales) made their international debuts.
- South Africa won in Wales for the first time since 2013 and reclaimed the Prince William Cup.

6 November 2021
21:00 CET (UTC+1)

France	29–20	Argentina
Try: Flament 50' c Mauvaka 71' c Con: Jaminet (2/2) 51', 72'; Pen: Jaminet (5/6) 3', 19', 35', 65', 80'	Report	Try: Cubelli 22' c M. Carreras 78' c Con: Boffelli (1/1) 23'; Sánchez (1/1) 78'; Pen: Boffelli (2/3) 48', 60'

Stade de France, Saint-Denis
Attendance: 55,000
Referee: Ben O'Keeffe (New Zealand)

Team details

FB	15	Melvyn Jaminet
RW	14	Damian Penaud
OC	13	Gaël Fickou
IC	12	Romain Ntamack		(substituted off) 54'
LW	11	Gabin Villière
FH	10	Matthieu Jalibert
SH	9	Antoine Dupont (c)
N8	8	Anthony Jelonch
OF	7	Cameron Woki
BF	6	François Cros		(substituted off) 29'	(substituted on) 40'	(substituted off) 57'
RL	5	Paul Willemse		(substituted off) 52'
LL	4	Thibaud Flament		(substituted off) 70'
TP	3	Mohamed Haouas		(substituted off) 52'
HK	2	Julien Marchand	(yellow card) 28' to 40'			(substituted off) 63'
LP	1	Cyril Baille		(substituted off) 63'
Replacements:
HK	16	Peato Mauvaka		(substituted on) 29'	(substituted off) 40'	(substituted on) 63'
PR	17	Jean-Baptiste Gros		(substituted on) 63'
PR	18	Demba Bamba		(substituted on) 52'
LK	19	Romain Taofifénua		(substituted on) 70'
FL	20	Grégory Alldritt				(substituted on) 57'
FL	21	Sekou Macalou		(substituted on) 52'
SH	22	Maxime Lucu
CE	23	Jonathan Danty		(substituted on) 54'
Coach:
(France) Fabien Galthié

FB	15	Emiliano Boffelli
RW	14	Bautista Delguy		(substituted off) 63'
OC	13	Matías Moroni
IC	12	Jerónimo de la Fuente
LW	11	Mateo Carreras
FH	10	Santiago Carreras		(substituted off) 76'
SH	9	Tomás Cubelli		(substituted off) 77'
N8	8	Facundo Isa
OF	7	Marcos Kremer	(yellow card) 28' to 40'
BF	6	Pablo Matera		17' to 19'
RL	5	Tomás Lavanini		(substituted off) 74'
LL	4	Guido Petti				(substituted off) 63'
TP	3	Francisco Gómez Kodela		(substituted off) 55'
HK	2	Julián Montoya (c)		(substituted off) 68'
LP	1	Thomas Gallo		(substituted off) 68'
Replacements:
HK	16	Facundo Bosch		(substituted on) 68'
PR	17	Rodrigo Martínez		(substituted on) 68'
PR	18	Santiago Medrano		(substituted on) 55'
LK	19	Lucas Paulos		(substituted on) 74'
FL	20	Juan Martín González		(substituted on) 17'	(substituted off) 19'	(substituted on) 63'
SH	21	Gonzalo Bertranou		(substituted on) 77'
FH	22	Nicolás Sánchez		(substituted on) 63'
CE	23	Lucio Cinti		(substituted on) 76'
Coach:
(Argentina) Mario Ledesma

Player of the Match:
Melvyn Jaminet (France)

Assistant referees:
Luke Pearce (England)
Christophe Ridley (England)
Television match official:
Brendon Pickerill (New Zealand)

Notes:

- Thibaud Flament (France) made his international debut.

6 November 2021

Georgia	Cancelled	Samoa

Not announced

7 November 2021
14:00 CET (UTC+1)

Romania	29–14	Uruguay
Try: Roșu 1' c Vaovasa 44' c Con: Melinte (2/2) 1', 45'; Pen: Melinte (5/7) 9', 23', 50', 58', 66'	Report	Try: Silva 15' m Pen: Favaro (3/3) 4', 30', 37'

Payanini Center, Verona, Italy (Note: Moved from Stadionul Arcul de Triumf in Bucharest)
Attendance: 150
Referee: Angus Gardner (Australia)

Team details

FB	15	Ionel Melinte
RW	14	Ionuț Dumitru	(substituted off) 76'
OC	13	Hinckley Vaovasa	(substituted off) 77'
IC	12	Jason Tomane
LW	11	Nicolas Onuțu
FH	10	Daniel Plai
SH	9	Gabriel Rupanu	(substituted off) 72'
N8	8	Mihai Macovei (c)
OF	7	Damian Strătilă
BF	6	Florian Roșu	(substituted off) 67'
RL	5	Adrian Moțoc
LL	4	Marius Antonescu	(substituted off) 13'	(substituted on) 26'	(substituted off) 77'
TP	3	Vasile Bălan	(substituted off) 77'
HK	2	Ovidiu Cojocaru	(substituted off) 72'
LP	1	Constantin Pristăviță	(substituted off) 76'
Replacements:
HK	16	Tudor Butnariu	(substituted on) 72'
PR	17	Dorin Tică	(substituted on) 76'
PR	18	Alex Gordaș	(substituted on) 77'
LK	19	Marius Iftimiciuc	(substituted on) 13'	(substituted off) 26'	(substituted on) 77'
FL	20	Alexandru Alexe	(substituted on) 67'
SH	21	Florin Surugiu	(substituted on) 72'
CE	22	Alexandru Bucur	(substituted on) 77'
WG	23	Paul Popoaia	(substituted on) 76'
Coach:
(England) Andy Robinson

FB	15	Rodrigo Silva
RW	14	Federico Favaro	(substituted off) 68'
OC	13	Nicolás Freitas
IC	12	Andrés Vilaseca (c)
LW	11	Gastón Mieres	(substituted off) 56'
FH	10	Felipe Echeverry
SH	9	Tomás Inciarte
N8	8	Manuel Diana	(substituted off) 68'
OF	7	Santiago Civetta
BF	6	Manuel Ardao
RL	5	Diego Magno
LL	4	Eric Dosantos	(substituted off) 68'
TP	3	Diego Arbelo	(substituted off) 72'
HK	2	Facundo Gattas	(substituted off) 72'
LP	1	Mateo Sanguinetti	(substituted off) 72'
Replacements:
HK	16	Guillermo Pujadas	(substituted on) 72'
PR	17	Juan Echeverría	(substituted on) 72'
PR	18	Matías Benítez	(substituted on) 72'
LK	19	Juanjuan Garese	(substituted on) 68'
N8	20	Felipe Aliaga	(substituted on) 68'
WG	21	Baltazar Amaya	(substituted on) 68'
SH	22	Juan Manuel Tafernaberry
WG	23	Felipe Arcos Perez	(substituted on) 56'
Coach:
(Argentina) Esteban Meneses

Assistant referees:
Nic Berry (Australia)
Gianluca Gnecchi (Italy)
Television match official:
Brett Cronan (Australia)

Notes:

- Alexandru Alexe, Tudor Butnariu, Damian Strătilă, Dorin Tică, Jason Tomane, Hinckley Vaovasa (all Romania) and Baltazar Amaya (Uruguay) made their international debuts.

7 November 2021
14:15 GMT (UTC+0)

Scotland	15–13	Australia
Try: Watson 22' c Ashman 59' m Con: Russell (1/2) 24'; Pen: Russell (1/1) 69'	Report	Try: Leota 44' c Con: O'Connor (1/1) 46'; Pen: O'Connor (2/3) 40', 65'

Murrayfield Stadium, Edinburgh
Attendance: 67,144
Referee: Romain Poite (France)

Team details

FB	15	Stuart Hogg (c)
RW	14	Darcy Graham	(substituted off) 60'
OC	13	Chris Harris
IC	12	Sam Johnson	(substituted off) 73'
LW	11	Duhan van der Merwe
FH	10	Finn Russell
SH	9	Ali Price	(substituted off) 71'
N8	8	Matt Fagerson
OF	7	Hamish Watson	(substituted off) 71'
BF	6	Jamie Ritchie
RL	5	Grant Gilchrist
LL	4	Sam Skinner	(substituted off) 62'
TP	3	Zander Fagerson	(substituted off) 65'
HK	2	George Turner	(substituted off) 12'
LP	1	Pierre Schoeman	(substituted off) 65'
Replacements:
HK	16	Ewan Ashman	(substituted on) 12'
PR	17	Jamie Bhatti	(substituted on) 65'
PR	18	Oli Kebble	(substituted on) 65'
LK	19	Jamie Hodgson	(substituted on) 62'
FL	20	Josh Bayliss	(substituted on) 71'
SH	21	George Horne	(substituted on) 71'
FH	22	Adam Hastings	(substituted on) 73'
WG	23	Kyle Steyn	(substituted on) 60'
Coach:
(Scotland) Gregor Townsend

FB	15	Andrew Kellaway
RW	14	Jordan Petaia		(substituted off) 40'
OC	13	Len Ikitau
IC	12	Hunter Paisami
LW	11	Tom Wright		(substituted off) 66'
FH	10	James O'Connor
SH	9	Nic White		(substituted off) 66'
N8	8	Rob Valetini		(substituted off) 38'		(substituted off) 46'
OF	7	Michael Hooper (c)
BF	6	Rob Leota		(substituted off) 60'
RL	5	Izack Rodda
LL	4	Rory Arnold		(substituted off) 50'
TP	3	Allan Alaalatoa	(yellow card) 37' to 46'				(substituted off) 55'	(substituted on) 64'
HK	2	Folau Fainga'a		(substituted off) 73'
LP	1	James Slipper						(substituted off) 64'
Replacements:
HK	16	Connal McInerney		(substituted on) 73'
PR	17	Angus Bell			(substituted on) 44'	(substituted off) 46'	(substituted on) 55'
PR	18	Taniela Tupou		(substituted on) 38'	(substituted off) 44'
LK	19	Will Skelton		(substituted on) 50'
FL	20	Pete Samu		(substituted on) 60'
SH	21	Tate McDermott		(substituted on) 66'
FB	22	Kurtley Beale		(substituted on) 66'
WG	23	Izaia Perese		(substituted on) 40'
Coach:
(New Zealand) Dave Rennie

Player of the Match:
Hamish Watson (Scotland)

Assistant referees:
Matthew Carley (England)
AJ Jacobs (South Africa)
Television match official:
Marius Jonker (South Africa)

Notes:

- Ewan Ashman, Josh Bayliss (both Scotland) and Izaia Perese (Australia) made their international debuts.
- Scotland retained the Hopetoun Cup.
- Scotland won a third consecutive match against Australia for the first time since 1982.
- Romain Poite retired from refereeing test rugby following this game

=== 13/14 November ===
13 November 2021
14:00 CET (UTC+1)

Italy	16–37	Argentina
Try: Varney 47' c Con: Garbisi (1/1) 49'; Pen: Garbisi (3/3) 32', 40+2', 51'	Report	Try: Kremer 9' c González 28' c Moroni 42' c Cordero 55' m Bosch 76' m Con: Boffelli (3/4) 10', 30', 43'; Pen: Boffelli (1/2) 15'; Sánchez (1/1) 64'

Stadio Comunale di Monigo, Treviso
Attendance: 3,750
Referee: James Doleman (New Zealand)

Team details

FB	15	Matteo Minozzi	(substituted off) 56'
RW	14	Edoardo Padovani
OC	13	Ignacio Brex
IC	12	Luca Morisi
LW	11	Monty Ioane
FH	10	Paolo Garbisi
SH	9	Stephen Varney	(substituted off) 71'
N8	8	Giovanni Licata	(substituted off) 49'
OF	7	Michele Lamaro (c)
BF	6	Sebastian Negri	(substituted off) 56'
RL	5	Dave Sisi	(substituted off) 49'
LL	4	Niccolò Cannone
TP	3	Marco Riccioni	(substituted off) 51'
HK	2	Gianmarco Lucchesi	(substituted off) 64'
LP	1	Ivan Nemer	(substituted off) 49'
Replacements:
HK	16	Luca Bigi	(substituted on) 64'
PR	17	Danilo Fischetti	(substituted on) 49'
PR	18	Pietro Ceccarelli	(substituted on) 51'
LK	19	Marco Fuser	(substituted on) 49'
LK	20	Federico Ruzza	(substituted on) 49'
FL	21	Giovanni Pettinelli	(substituted on) 56'
SH	22	Alessandro Fusco	(substituted on) 71'
WG	23	Federico Mori	(substituted on) 56'
Coach:
(New Zealand) Kieran Crowley

FB	15	Emiliano Boffelli
RW	14	Santiago Cordero
OC	13	Matías Moroni
IC	12	Jerónimo de la Fuente	(substituted off) 71'
LW	11	Mateo Carreras
FH	10	Santiago Carreras	(substituted off) 61'
SH	9	Tomás Cubelli	(substituted off) 66'
N8	8	Facundo Isa	(substituted off) 51'
OF	7	Juan Martín González
BF	6	Pablo Matera
RL	5	Tomás Lavanini	(substituted off) 66'
LL	4	Marcos Kremer
TP	3	Francisco Gómez Kodela	(substituted off) 56'
HK	2	Julián Montoya (c)	(substituted off) 71'
LP	1	Thomas Gallo	(substituted off) 61'
Replacements:
HK	16	Facundo Bosch	(substituted on) 71'
PR	17	Ignacio Calles	(substituted on) 61'
PR	18	Santiago Medrano	(substituted on) 56'
LK	19	Lucas Paulos	(substituted on) 66'
FL	20	Santiago Grondona	(substituted on) 51'
SH	21	Gonzalo Bertranou	(substituted on) 66'
FH	22	Nicolás Sánchez	(substituted on) 61'
CE	23	Lucio Cinti	(substituted on) 71'
Coach:
(Argentina) Mario Ledesma

Player of the Match:
Emiliano Boffelli (Argentina)

Assistant referees:
Paul Williams (New Zealand)
Ben Blain (Scotland)
Television match official:
Brendon Pickerill (New Zealand)

Notes:

- Alessandro Fusco, Giovanni Pettinelli (both Italy) and Ignacio Calles (Argentina) made their international debuts.

13 November 2021
13:00 GMT (UTC+0)

Scotland	15–30	South Africa
Try: Hogg (2) 34' c, 57' m Con: Russell (1/2) 34'; Pen: Russell (1/3) 16'	Report	Try: Mapimpi (2) 28' m, 42' c Con: E. Jantjies (1/1) 43'; Pen: E. Jantjies (3/3) 23', 50', 55'; Pollard (2/2) 68', 77'; Steyn (1/1) 70'

Murrayfield Stadium, Edinburgh
Attendance: 67,144
Referee: Angus Gardner (Australia)

Team details

FB	15	Stuart Hogg (c)
RW	14	Rufus McLean	(substituted off) 51'
OC	13	Chris Harris
IC	12	Matt Scott	(substituted off) 70'
LW	11	Duhan van der Merwe
FH	10	Finn Russell
SH	9	Ali Price	(substituted off) 70'
N8	8	Matt Fagerson
OF	7	Jamie Ritchie
BF	6	Nick Haining	(substituted off) 51'
RL	5	Grant Gilchrist
LL	4	Sam Skinner	(substituted off) 71'
TP	3	Zander Fagerson	(substituted off) 68'
HK	2	Stuart McInally	(substituted off) 61'
LP	1	Pierre Schoeman	(substituted off) 61'
Replacements:
HK	16	Ewan Ashman	(substituted on) 61'
PR	17	Jamie Bhatti	(substituted on) 61'
PR	18	Oli Kebble	(substituted on) 68'
LK	19	Jamie Hodgson	(substituted on) 71'
FL	20	Hamish Watson	(substituted on) 51'
SH	21	George Horne	(substituted on) 70'
FH	22	Adam Hastings	(substituted on) 70'
FB	23	Blair Kinghorn	(substituted on) 51'
Coach:
(Scotland) Gregor Townsend

FB	15	Willie le Roux	(substituted off) 64'
RW	14	Jesse Kriel
OC	13	Lukhanyo Am
IC	12	Damian de Allende
LW	11	Makazole Mapimpi
FH	10	Elton Jantjies	(substituted off) 59'
SH	9	Herschel Jantjies	(substituted off) 40'
N8	8	Duane Vermeulen	(substituted off) 74'
BF	7	Kwagga Smith
OF	6	Siya Kolisi (c)
RL	5	Franco Mostert	(substituted off) 61'
LL	4	Eben Etzebeth
TP	3	Trevor Nyakane	(substituted off) 40'
HK	2	Bongi Mbonambi	(substituted off) 40'
LP	1	Ox Nché	(substituted off) 40'
Replacements:
HK	16	Malcolm Marx	(substituted on) 40'
PR	17	Steven Kitshoff	(substituted on) 40'
PR	18	Vincent Koch	(substituted on) 40'
LK	19	Lood de Jager	(substituted on) 61'
N8	20	Jasper Wiese	(substituted on) 74'
SH	21	Cobus Reinach	(substituted on) 40'
FH	22	Handré Pollard	(substituted on) 59'
CE	23	François Steyn	(substituted on) 64'
Coach:
(South Africa) Jacques Nienaber

Player of the Match:
Eben Etzebeth (South Africa)

Assistant referees:
Wayne Barnes (England)
Craig Evans (Wales)
Television match official:
Brett Cronan (Australia)

Notes:

- Jesse Kriel and Franco Mostert (both South Africa) won their 50th caps.
- Stuart Hogg equalled Ian Smith and Tony Stanger's record as Scotland's all time top try scorer with 24 tries.

13 November 2021
15:00 CET (UTC+1)

Belgium	0–24	Canada
	Report	Try: Thomas 3' c Braude 76' m Con: Povey (1/1) 4'; Pen: Povey (1/3) 13'; Jones (3/3) 56', 63', 65'

Sportscentrum Nelson Mandela, Brussels
Attendance: 200
Referee: Andrea Piardi (Italy)

Team details

FB	15	Charles Reynaert
RW	14	Thomas Wallraf
OC	13	Jens Torfs
IC	12	Viktor Pazgrat	(substituted off) 40'
LW	11	Hugo Ruelle
FH	10	Henri Dequenne	(substituted off) 63'
SH	9	Ryan Godsmark	(substituted off) 63'
N8	8	Michael Abrahams	(substituted off) 48'
OF	7	Hugues Bastin
BF	6	Jean-Maurice Decubber (c)
RL	5	Maximilien Hendrickx
LL	4	Guillaume Mortier	(substituted off) 59'
TP	3	Basile Van Parys	(substituted off) 50'
HK	2	Vincent Tauzia	(substituted off) 50'
LP	1	Charlesty Berguet	(substituted off) 63'
Replacements:
HK	16	Alexandre Raynier	(substituted on) 50'
PR	17	Ian Dumez	(substituted on) 63'
PR	18	Samuel Opsomer	(substituted on) 50'
LK	19	Frédéric De Smet	(substituted on) 59'
SH	20	Tom Cocqu	(substituted on) 63'
FL	21	Toon Deceuninck	(substituted on) 48'
CE	22	Basile Poupaert	(substituted on) 40'
WG	23	Matias Remue	(substituted on) 63'
Coach:
(France) Frédéric Cocqu

FB	15	Robbie Povey
RW	14	Isaac Olson			(substituted off) 50'	(substituted on) 57'	(substituted off) 78'
OC	13	Ben LeSage
IC	12	Quinn Ngawati
LW	11	Kainoa Lloyd		(substituted off) 78'
FH	10	Spencer Jones
SH	9	Jason Higgins		(substituted off) 63'
N8	8	Corey Thomas		(substituted off) 78'
OF	7	Michael Smith	(red card) 18'
BF	6	Lucas Rumball (c)
RL	5	Kyle Baillie
LL	4	Conor Keys		(substituted off) 32'
TP	3	Tyler Rowland		(substituted off) 78'
HK	2	Andrew Quattrin		(substituted off) 40'	(substituted on) 50'	(substituted off) 57'
LP	1	Cole Keith		(substituted off) 53'
Replacements:
HK	16	Eric Howard	(yellow card) 47' to 57'	(substituted on) 40'
PR	17	Djustice Sears-Duru		(substituted on) 53'
PR	18	Foster DeWitt		(substituted on) 78'
LK	19	Josh Larsen		(substituted on) 32'
FL	20	Mason Flesch		(substituted on) 78'
SH	21	Ross Braude		(substituted on) 63'
WG	22	David Richard		(substituted on) 78'
CE	23	Lockie Kratz					(substituted on) 78'
Coach:
(Wales) Kingsley Jones

Assistant referees:
Federico Vedovelli (Italy)
Manuel Bottino (Italy)
Television match official:
Stefano Penne (Italy)

Notes:

- Brock Webster (Canada) was named to start but withdrew before the game and was replaced by Robbie Povey, who was replaced on the bench by David Richard.
- Michael Abrahams, Hugues Bastin, Toon Deceuninck, Henri Dequenne, Frédéric De Smet, Ian Dumez, Viktor Pazgrat, Basile Poupaert, Matias Remue, Hugo Ruelle, Basile Van Parys (all Belgium), Foster DeWitt, Isaac Olson and David Richard (all Canada) made their international debuts.

13 November 2021
16:00 CET (UTC+1)

French Barbarians	42–17	Tonga
Try: Tekori 9' c Lambey 23' c Acebes 40' c Ravouvou (2) 45' c, 57' c Hirigoyen 53' c Con: Belleau (6/6) 10', 24', 40', 46', 55', 58'		Try: Vaea 31' c Hingano 69' c Con: Faiva (2/2) 32', 70'; Pen: Faiva (1/1) 22'

Stade de Gerland, Lyon
Referee: Nika Amashukeli (Georgia)

Team details

FB	15	(France) Clément Laporte
RW	14	(New Zealand) Joe Ravouvou		(substituted off) 56'
OC	13	(France) Thomas Combezou		(substituted off) 58'
IC	12	(France) Mathieu Acebes
LW	11	(France) Arthur Bonneval
FH	10	(France) Anthony Belleau
SH	9	(France) Léo Coly		(substituted off) 53'
N8	8	(Samoa) Giovanni Habel Kuffner
OF	7	(France) Mathieu Hirigoyen					(substituted off) 70'
BF	6	(France) Lucas Bachelier		(substituted off) 30'	(substituted on) 40'	(substituted off) 59'	(substituted on) 70'
RL	5	(Samoa) Joe Tekori (c)		(substituted off) 50'
LL	4	(France) Félix Lambey
TP	3	(France) Nicolas Corato		(substituted off) 59'
HK	2	(France) Clément Maynadier		(substituted off) 50'
LP	1	(France) Étienne Falgoux	(yellow card) 30' to 40'			(substituted off) 50'
Replacements:
HK	16	(France) Guillaume Marchand		(substituted on) 50'
PR	17	(France) Quentin Béthune		(substituted on) 30'	(substituted off) 40'	(substituted on) 50'
PR	18	(France) Kevin Yameogo		(substituted on) 59'
LK	19	(France) Romain Sazy		(substituted on) 50'
FL	20	(France) Paul Abadie		(substituted on) 59'
SH	21	(France) Julien Blanc		(substituted on) 53'
FH	22	(France) Enzo Hervé		(substituted on) 58'
FB	23	(France) Alexandre Tchaptchet		(substituted on) 56'
Coaches:
(France) Xavier Garbajosa (France) Christian Labit

FB	15	Navarre Haisila		(substituted off) 50'
RW	14	Walter Fifita
OC	13	Afusipa Taumoepeau
IC	12	Vaea Vaea		(substituted off) 59'
LW	11	Solomone Kata	(yellow card) 43' to 54'
FH	10	James Faiva
SH	9	Sonatane Takulua (c)		(substituted off) 59'
N8	8	Lopeti Timani
OF	7	Mateaki Kafatolu		(substituted off) 69'
BF	6	Tanginoa Halaifonua
RL	5	Setefano Funaki		(substituted off) 59'
LL	4	Leva Fifita
TP	3	Ben Tameifuna		(substituted off) 62'
HK	2	Siua Maile		(substituted off) 59'
LP	1	Siegfried Fisiihoi		(substituted off) 62'
Replacements:
HK	16	Paul Ngauamo		(substituted on) 59'
PR	17	Jethro Felemi		(substituted on) 62'
PR	18	David Lolohea		(substituted on) 62'
FL	19	Fotu Lokotui		(substituted on) 59'
FL	20	Daniel Faleafa	(yellow card) 74'	(substituted on) 69'
SH	21	Aisea Halo		(substituted on) 59'
WG	22	Latu Latunipulu		(substituted on) 50'
CE	23	Mali Hingano		(substituted on) 59'
Caretaker coaches:
(Australia) Grant Doorey (New Zealand) John McKee

Assistant referees:
Ludovic Cayre (France)
Jonathan Dufort (France)
Television match official:
Eric Gauzins (France)

Notes:

- Henry Chavancy (French Barbarians) had been named to start but was replaced by Arthur Bonneval ahead of kick-off, with Alexandre Tchaptchet replacing Bonneval on the bench.

13 November 2021
15:15 WET (UTC+0)

Ireland	29–20	New Zealand
Try: Lowe 14' m Kelleher 43' m Doris 50' c Con: Sexton (1/3) 51'; Pen: Sexton (1/1) 55'; Carbery (3/3) 64', 73', 79'	Report	Try: Taylor 31' c Jordan 61' c Con: J. Barrett (2/2) 33', 62'; Pen: J. Barrett (2/2) 18', 69'

Aviva Stadium, Dublin
Attendance: 51,000
Referee: Luke Pearce (England)

Team details

FB	15	Hugo Keenan
RW	14	Andrew Conway
OC	13	Garry Ringrose
IC	12	Bundee Aki	(substituted off) 71'
LW	11	James Lowe
FH	10	Johnny Sexton (c)	(substituted off) 64'
SH	9	Jamison Gibson-Park	(substituted off) 71'
N8	8	Jack Conan
OF	7	Josh van der Flier	(substituted off) 58'
BF	6	Caelan Doris
RL	5	James Ryan
LL	4	Iain Henderson	(substituted off) 48'
TP	3	Tadhg Furlong	(substituted off) 65'
HK	2	Rónan Kelleher	(substituted off) 58'
LP	1	Andrew Porter	(substituted off) 75'
Replacements:
HK	16	Rob Herring	(substituted on) 58'
PR	17	Cian Healy	(substituted on) 75'
PR	18	Finlay Bealham	(substituted on) 65'
LK	19	Tadhg Beirne	(substituted on) 48'
FL	20	Peter O'Mahony	(substituted on) 58'
SH	21	Conor Murray	(substituted on) 71'
FH	22	Joey Carbery	(substituted on) 64'
WG	23	Keith Earls	(substituted on) 71'
Coach:
(England) Andy Farrell

FB	15	Jordie Barrett
RW	14	Will Jordan
OC	13	Rieko Ioane
IC	12	Anton Lienert-Brown		(substituted off) 38'
LW	11	Sevu Reece
FH	10	Beauden Barrett		(substituted off) 21'
SH	9	TJ Perenara
N8	8	Ardie Savea
OF	7	Dalton Papalii
BF	6	Ethan Blackadder		(substituted off) 20'	(substituted on) 25'	(substituted off) 64'
RL	5	Sam Whitelock (c)
LL	4	Brodie Retallick
TP	3	Nepo Laulala		(substituted off) 53'
HK	2	Codie Taylor	(yellow card) 12' to 22'			(substituted off) 53'
LP	1	Joe Moody		(substituted off) 53'
Replacements:
HK	16	Dane Coles		(substituted on) 20'	(substituted off) 25'	(substituted on) 53'
PR	17	Karl Tu'inukuafe		(substituted on) 53'
PR	18	Tyrel Lomax		(substituted on) 53'
LK	19	Tupou Vaa'i
FL	20	Akira Ioane				(substituted on) 64'
SH	21	Finlay Christie
FH	22	Richie Mo'unga		(substituted on) 21'
CE	23	David Havili		(substituted on) 38'
Coach:
(New Zealand) Ian Foster

Player of the Match:
Caelan Doris (Ireland)

Assistant referees:
Matthew Carley (England)
Christophe Ridley (England)
Television match official:
Tom Foley (England)

13 November 2021
17:10 WET (UTC+0)

Portugal	25–38	Japan
Try: Lima 23' m Tadjer 45' c Granate 60' c Con: Marques (2/3) 46', 61'; Pen: Marques (2/2) 17', 38'		Try: Fifita 4' m Nakano 40' c Himeno 53' c Yamanaka 80' c Con: Matsuda (3/4) 40', 54', 80'; Pen: Matsuda (4/4) 27', 32', 36', 63'

Estádio Cidade, Coimbra
Attendance: 14,000
Referee: Andrew Brace (Ireland)

Team details

FB	15	Nuno Sousa Guedes	(substituted off) 57'
RW	14	Raffaele Storti
OC	13	José Lima	(substituted off) 67'
IC	12	Tomás Appleton (c)
LW	11	Rodrigo Marta
FH	10	Jerónimo Portela
SH	9	Samuel Marques
N8	8	Rafael Simões	(substituted off) 64'
OF	7	David Wallis
BF	6	João Granate
RL	5	José Madeira	(substituted off) 73'
LL	4	Jean Sousa
TP	3	Anthony Alves	(substituted off) 64'
HK	2	Mike Tadjer
LP	1	Francisco Fernandes	(substituted off) 51'
Replacements:
PR	16	André Arrojado	(substituted on) 51'
HK	17	Duarte Diniz
PR	18	Diogo Hasse Ferreira	(substituted on) 64'
LK	19	Duarte Torgal	(substituted on) 73'
FL	20	Thibault de Freitas	(substituted on) 64'
SH	21	Théo Entraygues
CE	22	Pedro Bettencourt	(substituted on) 67'
FB	23	Manuel Cardoso Pinto	(substituted on) 57'
Coach:
(France) Patrice Lagisquet

FB	15	Ryohei Yamanaka
RW	14	Dylan Riley		(substituted off) 64'
OC	13	Shogo Nakano
IC	12	Ryoto Nakamura (c)
LW	11	Siosaia Fifita
FH	10	Rikiya Matsuda
SH	9	Kaito Shigeno		(substituted off) 64'
N8	8	Yoshitaka Tokunaga		(substituted off) 55'
OF	7	Kazuki Himeno
BF	6	Michael Leitch	(yellow card) 43' to 53'
RL	5	Naohiro Kotaki		(substituted off) 76'
LL	4	Jack Cornelsen
TP	3	Asaeli Ai Valu		(substituted off) 64'
HK	2	Kosuke Horikoshi		(substituted off) 64'
LP	1	Craig Millar		(substituted off) 64'	(substituted on) 76'
Replacements:
HK	16	Atsushi Sakate		(substituted on) 64'
PR	17	Isileli Nakajima	(yellow card) 76'	(substituted on) 64'
PR	18	Koo Ji-won		(substituted on) 64'	(substituted off) 76'
LK	19	Warner Dearns		(substituted on) 74'
FL	20	Faulua Makisi
SH	21	Naoto Saito		(substituted on) 64'
WG	22	Kotaro Matsushima		(substituted on) 64'
N8	23	Tevita Tatafu		(substituted on) 55'
Coach:
(New Zealand) Jamie Joseph

Assistant referees:
Frank Murphy (Ireland)
Chris Busby (Ireland)
Television match official:
Brian MacNeice (Ireland)

Notes:

- Geoffrey Moïse (Portugal) had been named on the bench but withdrew ahead of kick-off and replaced by André Arrojado.
- Warner Dearns and Shogo Nakano (both Japan) made their international debuts.
- This was the first meeting between the two nations.

13 November 2021
17:30 GMT (UTC+0)

England	32–15	Australia
Try: Steward 6' c Blamire 80' c Con: Farrell (1/1) 7'; Smith (1/1) 80'; Pen: Farrell (5/6) 12', 17', 30', 48', 64'; Smith (1/1) 72'	Report	Pen: O'Connor (5/5) 4', 14', 20', 39', 42'

Twickenham Stadium, London
Attendance: 82,575
Referee: Jaco Peyper (South Africa)

Team details

FB	15	Freddie Steward
RW	14	Manu Tuilagi
OC	13	Henry Slade
IC	12	Owen Farrell (c)	(substituted off) 68'
LW	11	Jonny May
FH	10	Marcus Smith
SH	9	Ben Youngs	(substituted off) 72'
N8	8	Tom Curry
OF	7	Sam Underhill	(substituted off) 48'	(substituted on) 57'	(substituted off) 64'
BF	6	Courtney Lawes	(substituted off) 74'
RL	5	Jonny Hill	(substituted off) 74'
LL	4	Maro Itoje
TP	3	Kyle Sinckler	(substituted off) 78'
HK	2	Jamie George	(substituted off) 40'
LP	1	Bevan Rodd	(substituted off) 71'
Replacements:
HK	16	Jamie Blamire	(substituted on) 40'
PR	17	Trevor Davison	(substituted on) 71'
PR	18	Will Stuart	(substituted on) 78'
LK	19	Charlie Ewels	(substituted on) 74'
N8	20	Alex Dombrandt	(substituted on) 48'	(substituted off) 57'	(substituted on) 64'
N8	21	Sam Simmonds	(substituted on) 74'
SH	22	Raffi Quirke	(substituted on) 71'
FB	23	Max Malins	(substituted on) 68'
Coach:
(Australia) Eddie Jones

FB	15	Kurtley Beale
RW	14	Andrew Kellaway
OC	13	Len Ikitau
IC	12	Hunter Paisami
LW	11	Tom Wright	(yellow card) 29' to 39'	(substituted off) 66'
FH	10	James O'Connor		(substituted off) 74'
SH	9	Nic White		(substituted off) 73'
N8	8	Rob Valetini
BF	7	Michael Hooper (c)		(substituted off) 55'
OF	6	Rob Leota
RL	5	Izack Rodda
LL	4	Rory Arnold		(substituted off) 62'
TP	3	James Slipper		(substituted off) 67'
HK	2	Folau Fainga'a		(substituted off) 65'
LP	1	Angus Bell	(yellow card) 47' to 57'	(substituted off) 73'
Replacements:
HK	16	Tolu Latu		(substituted on) 65'
PR	17	Tom Robertson		(substituted on) 73'
PR	18	Ollie Hoskins		(substituted on) 67'
LK	19	Will Skelton		(substituted on) 62'
FL	20	Pete Samu		(substituted on) 55'
SH	21	Tate McDermott		(substituted on) 73'
FH	22	Noah Lolesio		(substituted on) 74'
WG	23	Izaia Perese		(substituted on) 66'
Coach:
(New Zealand) Dave Rennie

Player of the Match:
Freddie Steward (England)

Assistant referees:
AJ Jacobs (South Africa)
Pierre Brousset (France)
Television match official:
Stuart Berry (South Africa)

Notes:

- Ellis Genge was initially named to start but was ruled out before the match after a positive COVID-19 test; Bevan Rodd replaced Genge at loosehead, and Trevor Davison took Rodd's place among the replacements.
- Raffi Quirke, Bevan Rodd (both England) and Ollie Hoskins (Australia) made their international debuts.
- Maro Itoje (England) won his 50th international cap.
- Owen Farrell became the third England player to earn his 100th international cap; 94 for England and 6 for the British & Irish Lions.
- Jamie Blamire became the first English forward to score a try in four consecutive matches.
- England retained the Cook Cup.

14 November 2021
14:00 SAST (UTC+2)

Brazil	22–24	Zimbabwe
Try: Henrique 48' de Souza 74' m Rocha 80' c Con: Tranquez (2/3) 49', 80'; Pen: Tranquez (1/1) 65'	Report	Try: Mudzekenyedzi 16'; Tsomondo 23'; Chiwambutsa 66'; Con: White-Sharpley (3/3) 17', 24', 67'; Pen: White-Sharpley (1/3) 21'

Markötter Stadium, Stellenbosch, South Africa
Referee: Nicardo Pienaar (Namibia)

Team details

FB	15	Lucas Tranquez
RW	14	Robert Tenório
OC	13	Gabriel Quirino
IC	12	De Wet van Niekerk		(substituted off) 40'
LW	11	Daniel Lima
FH	10	Lucas Spago
SH	9	Douglas Rauth		(substituted off) 67'
N8	8	André Arruda
OF	7	Matheus Cláudio (c)		(substituted off) 67'
BF	6	Adrio de Melo
RL	5	Kauã Guimarães		(substituted off) 47'
LL	4	Gabriel Paganini	(yellow card) 59' to 69'
TP	3	Henrique Ferreira		(substituted off) 40'
HK	2	Endy Willian		(substituted off) 40'
LP	1	Caíque Silva		(substituted off) 64'
Replacements:
HK	16	Leonardo de Souza		(substituted on) 40'
PR	17	Lucas Abud		(substituted on) 64'
PR	18	Matheus Rocha		(substituted on) 40'
FL	19	Devon Müller		(substituted on) 47'
FL	20	Arthur Bergo		(substituted on) 67'
SH	21	Felipe Cunha		(substituted on) 67'
CE	22	Pedro Henrique		(substituted on) 40'
FB	23	Robson Morais
Coach:
(Brazil) Fernando Portugal

FB	15	Tapiwa Mafura
RW	14	Brandon Mudzekenyedzi
OC	13	Riaan O'Neill
IC	12	Takudzwa Chieza
LW	11	Takudzwa Kumadiro
FH	10	Dundlee White-Sharpley		(substituted off) 75'
SH	9	Hilton Mudariki (c)		(substituted off) 75'
N8	8	Tapiwa Tsomondo		(substituted off) 52'
OF	7	Biselele Tshamala	(yellow card) 69' to 79'	(substituted off) 79'
BF	6	Godfrey Muzanargwo
RL	5	George Saungweme		(substituted off) 62'
LL	4	Sean Beevor
TP	3	Cleopas Kundiona		(substituted off) 40'
HK	2	Royal Mwale		(substituted off) 67'
LP	1	Tyron Fagan		(substituted off) 65'
Replacements:
HK	16	Deanne Makonit		(substituted on) 67'
PR	17	Victor Mapunga		(substituted on) 65'
PR	18	Bornwell Gwinji		(substituted on) 40'
LK	19	Godwin Mangenje		(substituted on) 62'
FL	20	Tonderai Chiwambutsa		(substituted on) 52'
CE	21	Keith Chiwara		(substituted on) 75'
FB	22	Shingirai Katsvere		(substituted on) 75'
FL	23	Aiden Burnett		(substituted on) 79'
Coach:
(Zimbabwe) Brendon Dawson

Assistant referees:
SARU Appt. (South Africa)
SARU Appt. (South Africa)

Notes:

- Henrique Ferreira, Kauã Guimarães, Pedro Henrique, Devon Müller, Gabriel Quirino (all Brazil), Tapiwa Mafura, Victor Mapunga and Tapiwa Tsomondo (all Zimbabwe) made their international debuts.
- This was the first meeting between the two sides.

14 November 2021
14:00 CET (UTC+1)

France	41–15	Georgia
Try: Penalty try 23'; Jalibert 31' c Penaud (2) 35' c, 72' m Mauvaka (2) 50' c, 79' m Con: Jaminet (3/3) 32', 36', 51'; Pen: Jaminet (1/2) 8'	Report	Try: Lobzhanidze 47' c Tabutsadze 63' m Con: Abzhandadze (1/2) 48'; Pen: Niniashvili (1/1) 21'

Nouveau Stade de Bordeaux, Bordeaux
Attendance: 38,000
Referee: Damon Murphy (Australia)

Team details

FB	15	Melvyn Jaminet	(substituted off) 51'
RW	14	Damian Penaud
OC	13	Gaël Fickou
IC	12	Romain Ntamack
LW	11	Matthis Lebel
FH	10	Matthieu Jalibert
SH	9	Antoine Dupont (c)	(substituted off) 58'
N8	8	Grégory Alldritt
OF	7	Sekou Macalou
BF	6	Anthony Jelonch	(substituted off) 51'
RL	5	Romain Taofifénua	(substituted off) 48'
LL	4	Cameron Woki	(substituted off) 48'
TP	3	Uini Atonio	(substituted off) 45'
HK	2	Julien Marchand	(substituted off) 39'
LP	1	Cyril Baille	(substituted off) 45'
Replacements:
HK	16	Peato Mauvaka	(substituted on) 39'
PR	17	Jean-Baptiste Gros	(substituted on) 45'
PR	18	Demba Bamba	(substituted on) 45'
LK	19	Thibaud Flament	(substituted on) 48'
LK	20	Paul Willemse	(substituted on) 48'
FL	21	François Cros	(substituted on) 51'
SH	22	Maxime Lucu	(substituted on) 58'
CE	23	Jonathan Danty	(substituted on) 51'
Coach:
(France) Fabien Galthié

FB	15	Davit Niniashvili
RW	14	Aka Tabutsadze
OC	13	Giorgi Kveseladze		(substituted off) 58'
IC	12	Merab Sharikadze (c)
LW	11	Alexander Todua
FH	10	Tedo Abzhandadze	(yellow card) 14' to 24'	(substituted off) 64'
SH	9	Vasil Lobzhanidze		(substituted off) 73'
N8	8	Beka Gorgadze
OF	7	Giorgi Tsutskiridze		(substituted off) 64'
BF	6	Beka Saghinadze	(yellow card) 23' to 33'
RL	5	Konstantin Mikautadze		(substituted off) 64'
LL	4	Grigor Kerdikoshvili
TP	3	Giorgi Melikidze		(substituted off) 40'
HK	2	Shalva Mamukashvili		(substituted off) 51'
LP	1	Beka Gigashvili		(substituted off) 40'
Replacements:
HK	16	Giorgi Chkoidze		(substituted on) 51'
PR	17	Guram Gogichashvili		(substituted on) 40'
PR	18	Luka Japaridze		(substituted on) 40'
LK	19	Nodar Tcheishvili		(substituted on) 64'
FL	20	Tornike Jalaghonia		(substituted on) 64'
SH	21	Mikheil Alania		(substituted on) 73'
FB	22	Lasha Khmaladze		(substituted on) 64'
CE	23	Demur Tapladze		(substituted on) 58'
Coach:
(Georgia (country)) Levan Maisashvili

Player of the Match:
Damian Penaud (France)

Assistant referees:
Karl Dickson (England)
Sam Grove-White (Scotland)
Television match official:
Ben Whitehouse (Wales)

Notes:

- Matthis Lebel and Maxime Lucu (both France) made their international debuts.
- This was the first time these two teams had met outside a Rugby World Cup.

14 November 2021
14:30 CET (UTC+1)

Italy A	31–13	Uruguay
Try: Cannone 4' m Bruno 24' c Tavuyara 30' c Casilio 41' m Trulla 75' m Con: Marin (2/4) 25', 31'; Rizzi (1/1) 76'	Report	Try: Pujadas (2) 57' m, 67' m Pen: Echeverry (1/1) 8'

Stadio Plebiscito, Padua
Attendance: 600
Referee: Mike Adamson (Scotland)

14 November 2021
16:00 SAST (UTC+2)

Namibia	60–24	Kenya
Try: Greyling (2) 7' m, 54' m Bothma 15' c van Lill 35' c van der Westhuizen (3) 41' c, 46' m, 65'; Louis 50' m Kisting 72' c Conradie 75' c Con: Loubser (2/3) 16', 36'; Stevens (1/4) 42'; Olivier (2/3) 74', 76'		Try: Ojee 11' c Onyala (2) 21' c, 25' c Con: Kubu (3/3) 12', 23', 26'; Pen: Kubu (1/1) 40'

Markötter Stadium, Stellenbosch, South Africa
Referee: Morné Ferreira (South Africa)

Team details

FB	15	Lorenzo Louis		(substituted off) 74'
RW	14	Oderich Mouton
OC	13	Johan Deysel (c)
IC	12	Danco Burger		(substituted off) 62'
LW	11	J. C. Greyling
FH	10	Cliven Loubser
SH	9	Damian Stevens		(substituted off) 65'
N8	8	Renaldo Bothma		(substituted off) 52'
OF	7	Janco Venter
BF	6	Wian Conradie	(yellow card) 30' to 40'
RL	5	Max Katjijeko
LL	4	P. J. van Lill		(substituted off) 52'
TP	3	Aranos Coetzee		(substituted off) 27'
HK	2	Obert Nortjé		(substituted off) 40'
LP	1	Herschell van Wyk		(substituted off) 62'
Replacements:
HK	16	Louis van der Westhuizen		(substituted on) 40'
PR	17	Jason Benade		(substituted on) 62'
PR	18	Gerhard Opperman		(substituted on) 27'
LK	19	Johan Retief		(substituted on) 52'
FL	20	Adriaan Booysen		(substituted on) 52'
SH	21	TC Kisting		(substituted on) 65'
FH	22	Henrique Olivier		(substituted on) 62'
WG	23	Jayden Bussel		(substituted on) 74'
Coach:
(South Africa) Allister Coetzee

FB	15	Darwin Mukidza
RW	14	Jacob Ojee
OC	13	Vincent Onyala
IC	12	John Okoth	(substituted off) 67'
LW	11	Brian Tanga	(substituted off) 67'
FH	10	John Kubu	(substituted off) 63'
SH	9	Samwel Asati
N8	8	Joshua Chisanga	(substituted off) 63'
OF	7	Dan Sikuta (c)
BF	6	George Nyambua
RL	5	Thomas Okeyo
LL	4	Malcolm Onsando	(substituted off) 54'
TP	3	Patrick Oyugi	(substituted off) 54'
HK	2	Eugene Sifuna	(substituted off) 63'
LP	1	Ian Njenga	(substituted off) 61'
Replacements:
HK	16	Bonface Ochieng	(substituted on) 63'
PR	17	Andrew Siminyu	(substituted on) 61'
PR	18	Ephraim Oduor	(substituted on) 54'
LK	19	Brian Juma	(substituted on) 54'
FL	20	Steve Sakari	(substituted on) 63'
SH	21	Brian Wahinya	(substituted on) 63'
CE	22	Peter Kilonzo	(substituted on) 67'
FB	23	Andrew Matoka	(substituted on) 67'
Coach:
(Kenya) Paul Odera

Assistant referees:
SARU Appt. (South Africa)
SARU Appt. (South Africa)

Notes:

- Danco Burger, Jayden Bussel, Lorenzo Louis, Gerhard Opperman, Herschell van Wyk (all Namibia) and Brian Wahinya (Kenya) made their international debuts.

14 November 2021
15:15 GMT (UTC+0)

Wales	38–23	Fiji
Try: Elias (2) 10' c, 62' m Hardy 37' c Cuthbert 65' m Rees-Zammit 73' c L. Williams 80' c Con: Biggar (2/3) 11', 38'; Sheedy (2/3) 74', 80'	Report	Try: Nayacalevu (2) 3' c, 56' c Con: Volavola (2/2) 5', 57'; Pen: Volavola (3/4) 5', 57'

Millennium Stadium, Cardiff
Attendance: 65,000
Referee: Nic Berry (Australia)

Team details

FB	15	Liam Williams
RW	14	Alex Cuthbert
OC	13	Nick Tompkins
IC	12	Johnny Williams	(substituted off) 50'
LW	11	Louis Rees-Zammit
FH	10	Dan Biggar	(substituted off) 63'
SH	9	Kieran Hardy	(substituted off) 50'
N8	8	Taine Basham
OF	7	Thomas Young	(substituted off) 57'
BF	6	Ellis Jenkins (c)
RL	5	Adam Beard
LL	4	Will Rowlands	(substituted off) 65'
TP	3	WillGriff John	(substituted off) 6'
HK	2	Ryan Elias
LP	1	Rhys Carré	(substituted off) 49'
Replacements:
HK	16	Bradley Roberts
PR	17	Gareth Thomas	(substituted on) 49'
PR	18	Dillon Lewis	(substituted on) 6'
LK	19	Christ Tshiunza	(substituted on) 65'
N8	20	Seb Davies	(substituted on) 57'
SH	21	Tomos Williams	(substituted on) 50'
FH	22	Callum Sheedy	(substituted on) 63'
CE	23	Willis Halaholo	(substituted on) 50'
Coach:
(New Zealand) Wayne Pivac

FB	15	Seta Tuicuvu		(substituted off) 75'
RW	14	Josua Tuisova		(substituted off) 79'
OC	13	Waisea Nayacalevu (c)
IC	12	Vilimoni Botitu		(substituted off) 58'
LW	11	Eroni Sau	(red card) 24'
FH	10	Ben Volavola
SH	9	Frank Lomani		(substituted off) 71'
N8	8	Viliame Mata
OF	7	Mesu Kunavula		(substituted off) 50'
BF	6	Albert Tuisue	(yellow card) 37' to 47'
RL	5	Temo Mayanavanua
LL	4	Api Ratuniyarawa		(substituted off) 71'
TP	3	Mesake Doge		(substituted off) 50'
HK	2	Sam Matavesi
LP	1	Peni Ravai		(substituted off) 50'
Replacements:
HK	16	Zuriel Togiatama		(substituted on) 79'
PR	17	Eroni Mawi	(yellow card) 61' to 71'	(substituted on) 50'
PR	18	Lee-Roy Atalifo		(substituted on) 50'
LK	19	Tevita Ratuva		(substituted on) 71'
FL	20	Masivesi Dakuwaqa		(substituted on) 50'
SH	21	Nikola Matawalu		(substituted on) 71'
CE	22	Apisai Naqalevu		(substituted on) 58'
WG	23	Aminiasi Tuimaba		(substituted on) 75'
Caretaker coach:
(Wales) Gareth Baber

Player of the Match:
Liam Williams (Wales)

Assistant referees:
Ben O'Keeffe (New Zealand)
Gianluca Gnecchi (Italy)
Television match official:
Stuart Terheege (England)

Notes:

- Josh Adams and Tomas Francis were initially named to start but were ruled out before the match due to injury; WillGriff John replaced Francis at tighthead, and Nick Tompkins replaced Adams at outside centre; Dillon Lewis and Willis Halaholo replaced John and Tompkins on the bench.
- Christ Tshiunza (Wales), Apisai Naqalevu and Zuriel Togiatama (both Fiji) made their international debuts.

=== 20/21 November ===
20 November 2021
14:00 SAST (UTC+2)

Brazil	30–36	Kenya
Try: Müller 23' c Penalty try (2) 44', 59'; Con: Tranquez (1/1) 24'; Pen: Tranquez (3/3) 7', 14', 38'	Report	Try: Kubu (2) 30' c, 46' c Okoth 33' m Onyala 40' c Asati 65' c Con: Kubu (4/5) 30' 40+1', 47', 66'; Pen: Kubu (1/2) 17'

Markötter Stadium, Stellenbosch, South Africa
Referee: Morné Ferreira (South Africa)

Team details

FB	15	Lucas Tranquez
RW	14	Robert Tenório	(substituted off) 22'
OC	13	Gabriel Quirino
IC	12	Pedro Henrique	(substituted off) 40'
LW	11	Daniel Lima
FH	10	Lucas Spago
SH	9	Felipe Cunha	(substituted off) 48'
N8	8	André Arruda
OF	7	Devon Müller
BF	6	Matheus Cláudio (c)	(substituted off) 40'
RL	5	Gabriel Paganini	(substituted off) 48'
LL	4	Cléber Dias
TP	3	Matheus Rocha	(substituted off) 55'
HK	2	Leonardo de Souza	(substituted off) 35'	(substituted on) 79'
LP	1	Caíque Silva	(substituted off) 56'
Replacements:
HK	16	Endy Willian	(substituted on) 35'	(substituted off) 79'
PR	17	Alexandre Alves	(substituted on) 56'
PR	18	Joel Ramírez	(substituted on) 55'
FL	19	Adrio de Melo	(substituted on) 48'
FL	20	Arthur Bergo	(substituted on) 40'
SH	21	Douglas Rauth	(substituted on) 48'
CE	22	De Wet van Niekerk	(substituted on) 40'
FB	23	Robson Morais	(substituted on) 22'
Coach:
(Brazil) Fernando Portugal

FB	15	Darwin Mukidza
RW	14	Jacob Ojee
OC	13	Vincent Onyala
IC	12	John Okoth
LW	11	Andrew Matoka
FH	10	John Kubu
SH	9	Brian Wahinya		(substituted off) 55'
N8	8	Joshua Chisanga		(substituted off) 58'
OF	7	Dan Sikuta (c)
BF	6	George Nyambua		(substituted off) 77'
RL	5	Thomas Okeyo	(yellow card) 42' to 52'
LL	4	Malcolm Onsando		(substituted off) 69'
TP	3	Ephraim Oduor
HK	2	Eugene Sifuna		(substituted off) 77'
LP	1	Ian Njenga		(substituted off) 62'
Replacements:
HK	16	Bonface Ochieng		(substituted on) 77'
PR	17	Joseph Odero		(substituted on) 62'
PR	18	Patrick Ouko		(substituted on) 77'
LK	19	Brian Juma		(substituted on) 69'
FL	20	Elkeans Musonye		(substituted on) 58'
SH	21	Samuel Asati		(substituted on) 55'
CE	22	Peter Kilonzo
FB	23	Isaac Njoroge
Coach:
(Kenya) Paul Odera

Player of the Match:
Jonah Kubu (Kenya)

Assistant referees:
SARU Appt. (South Africa)
SARU Appt. (South Africa)

Notes:

- Robson Morais and Joel Ramírez (both Brazil) made their international debuts.

20 November 2021
15:00 MSK (UTC+3)

Russia	29–30	Chile
Try: Golosnitsky 18' c Uzunov 34'; Con: Gaisin (2/2) 19', 35'; Pen: Gaisin (5/5) 40', 58', 62', 67', 70'	Report	Try: Fernández 37' c Martínez 55' c Ayarza 74' c Con: Videla (3/3) 37', 56', 75'; Pen: Videla (3/3) 5' 64', 80+1'

Yug Sport Stadium, Sochi
Referee: Chris Busby (Ireland)

Team details

FB	15	Alexei Golov
RW	14	Andrei Karzanov
OC	13	Denis Semikov
IC	12	Kirill Golosnitsky
LW	11	Daniil Potikhanov
FH	10	Ramil Gaisin
SH	9	Konstantin Uzunov	(substituted off) 76'
N8	8	Nikita Vavilin
OF	7	Anton Sychev	(substituted off) 71'
BF	6	Vitaly Zhivatov (c)
RL	5	German Silenko	(substituted off) 74'
LL	4	Alexander Ilin
TP	3	Vladimir Podrezov	(substituted off) 50'
HK	2	Dmitry Parkhomenko	(substituted off) 64'
LP	1	Evgeny Mishechkin	(substituted off) 50'
Replacements:
HK	16	Alexander Ivanov	(substituted on) 64'
PR	17	Valery Morozov	(substituted on) 50'
PR	18	Anton Drozdov	(substituted on) 50'
LK	19	Igor Zykov	(substituted on) 74'
FL	20	Ivan Chepraga	(substituted on) 71'
SH	21	Denis Barabantsev	(substituted on) 76'
FL	22	Pavel Kirillov
FH	23	Gleb Farkov
Coach:
(Wales) Lyn Jones

FB	15	Santiago Videla
RW	14	Nicolás Garafulic
OC	13	Domingo Saavedra
IC	12	Matías Garafulic
LW	11	Iñaki Ayarza
FH	10	Rodrigo Fernández
SH	9	Nicolás Herreros	(substituted off) 40'
N8	8	Raimundo Martínez
OF	7	Thomas Orchard	(substituted off) 64'
BF	6	Martín Sigren (c)
RL	5	Javier Eissmann	(substituted off) 39'
LL	4	Augusto Sarmiento
TP	3	Matías Dittus	(substituted off) 67'
HK	2	Tomás Dussaillant	(substituted off) 55'
LP	1	Javier Carrasco	(substituted off) 67'
Replacements:
HK	16	Augusto Böhme	(substituted on) 58'
PR	17	Salvador Lues	(substituted on) 67'
PR	18	Iñaki Gurruchaga	(substituted on) 67'
LK	19	Clemente Saavedra	(substituted on) 39'
FL	20	Alfonso Escobar	(substituted on) 64'
SH	21	Marcelo Torrealba
CE	22	José Ignacio Larenas
FB	23	Pablo Casas	(substituted on) 40'
Coach:
(Uruguay) Pablo Lemoine

Assistant referees:
Adam Jones (Wales)
Manuel Bottino (Italy)
Television match official:
Sean Brickell (Wales)

Notes:

- Ivan Chepraga (Russia) made his international debut.
- This was Chile's first win over Russia.

20 November 2021
13:00 GMT (UTC+0)

Scotland	29–20	Japan
Try: Van der Merwe 5' m Hogg 27' c Graham 39' c McInally 54' c Con: Russell (3/4) 28', 40', 55'; Pen: Russell (1/1) 78'	Report	Try: Tatafu 64' m Pen: Matsuda (5/6) 10', 25', 42', 46', 70'

Murrayfield Stadium, Edinburgh
Attendance: 67,144
Referee: Brendon Pickerill (New Zealand)

Team details

FB	15	Stuart Hogg (c)
RW	14	Darcy Graham		(substituted off) 63'
OC	13	Chris Harris
IC	12	Sam Johnson
LW	11	Duhan van der Merwe
FH	10	Finn Russell
SH	9	Ali Price		(substituted off) 63'
N8	8	Josh Bayliss
OF	7	Hamish Watson		(substituted off) 48'	(substituted on) 53'	(substituted off) 71'
BF	6	Jamie Ritchie		(substituted off) 62'
RL	5	Grant Gilchrist
LL	4	Scott Cummings		(substituted off) 71'
TP	3	Zander Fagerson		(substituted off) 63'
HK	2	George Turner		(substituted off) 53'
LP	1	Jamie Bhatti	(yellow card) 42' to 52'		(substituted off) 53'
Replacements:
HK	16	Stuart McInally		(substituted on) 53'
PR	17	Pierre Schoeman		(substituted on) 48'
PR	18	Javan Sebastian		(substituted on) 63'
LK	19	Sam Skinner		(substituted on) 71'
FL	20	Dylan Richardson				(substituted on) 71'
FL	21	Matt Fagerson		(substituted on) 62'
SH	22	George Horne		(substituted on) 63'
FB	23	Blair Kinghorn		(substituted on) 63'
Coach:
(Scotland) Gregor Townsend

FB	15	Ryohei Yamanaka	(substituted off) 61'
RW	14	Kotaro Matsushima
OC	13	Shogo Nakano	(substituted off) 40'
IC	12	Ryoto Nakamura
LW	11	Siosaia Fifita
FH	10	Rikiya Matsuda
SH	9	Yutaka Nagare	(substituted off) 69'
N8	8	Kazuki Himeno
OF	7	Lappies Labuschagné (c)
BF	6	Michael Leitch	(substituted off) 61'
RL	5	James Moore
LL	4	Jack Cornelsen
TP	3	Asaeli Ai Valu	(substituted off) 62'
HK	2	Atsushi Sakate
LP	1	Craig Millar	(substituted off) 62'
Replacements:
HK	16	Kosuke Horikoshi
PR	17	Keita Inagaki	(substituted on) 62'
PR	18	Shinnosuke Kakinaga	(substituted on) 62'
FL	19	Ben Gunter
N8	20	Tevita Tatafu	(substituted on) 61'
SH	21	Naoto Saito	(substituted on) 69'
FH	22	Yu Tamura	(substituted on) 61'
CE	23	Dylan Riley	(substituted on) 40'
Coach:
(New Zealand) Jamie Joseph

Player of the Match:
Kotaro Matsushima (Japan)

Assistant referees:
Paul Williams (New Zealand)
Andrea Piardi (Italy)
Television match official:
Stuart Berry (South Africa)

Notes:

- Dylan Richardson and Javan Sebastian (both Scotland) made their international debuts.
- Stuart Hogg became Scotland's all-time top try scorer, surpassing Ian Smith and Tony Stanger's record of 24 tries.

20 November 2021
14:00 CET (UTC+1)

Italy	17–10	Uruguay
Try: Bruno 12' c Faiva 52' c Con: Garbisi (2/2) 13', 53'; Pen: Garbisi (1/2) 39'		Try: Sanguinetti 60'; Con: Ormaechea (1/1) 62'; Pen: Favaro (1/2) 18'

Stadio Sergio Lanfranchi, Parma
Attendance: 3,750
Referee: Craig Evans (Wales)

Team details

FB	15	Edoardo Padovani
RW	14	Pierre Bruno		(substituted off) 74'
OC	13	Ignacio Brex
IC	12	Luca Morisi
LW	11	Monty Ioane
FH	10	Paolo Garbisi
SH	9	Callum Braley		(substituted off) 62'
N8	8	Braam Steyn
OF	7	Michele Lamaro (c)
BF	6	Sebastian Negri		(substituted off) 62'
RL	5	Federico Ruzza
LL	4	Marco Fuser		(substituted off) 56'
TP	3	Ivan Nemer		(substituted off) 50'
HK	2	Luca Bigi		(substituted off) 50'
LP	1	Danilo Fischetti	(yellow card) 75'	(substituted off) 50'	(substituted on) 71'
Replacements:
HK	16	Hame Faiva		(substituted on) 50'
PR	17	Cherif Traorè		(substituted on) 50'	(substituted off) 71'
PR	18	Pietro Ceccarelli		(substituted on) 50'
LK	19	David Sisi		(substituted on) 56'
FL	20	Giovanni Licata		(substituted on) 62'
SH	21	Alessandro Fusco		(substituted on) 62'
FH	22	Carlo Canna
WG	23	Iliesa Ratuva Tavuyara		(substituted on) 74'
Coach:
(New Zealand) Kieran Crowley

FB	15	Rodrigo Silva		(substituted off) 56'	(substituted on) 69'
RW	14	Federico Favaro		(substituted off) 56'
OC	13	Felipe Arcos Pérez		(substituted off) 73'
IC	12	Nicolás Freitas (c)
LW	11	Gastón Mieres			(substituted off) 69'
FH	10	Felipe Echeverry
SH	9	Tomás Inciarte	(yellow card) 36' to 46'
N8	8	Manuel Diana
OF	7	Santiago Civetta
BF	6	Manuel Ardao		(substituted off) 71'
RL	5	Manuel Leindekar		(substituted off) 68'
LL	4	Eric Dosantos
TP	3	Diego Arbelo		(substituted off) 77'
HK	2	Germán Kessler		(substituted off) 64'
LP	1	Mateo Sanguinetti		(substituted off) 71'
Replacements:
HK	16	Facundo Gattas		(substituted on) 64'
PR	17	Ignacio Péculo		(substituted on) 77'
PR	18	Matías Benítez		(substituted on) 71'
LK	19	Diego Magno		(substituted on) 68'
FL	20	Franco Lamanna		(substituted on) 71'
SH	21	Agustín Ormaechea		(substituted on) 56'
WG	22	Mateo Viñals		(substituted on) 56'
CE	23	Juan Manuel Alonso		(substituted on) 73'
Coach:
(Argentina) Esteban Meneses

Player of the Match:
Pierre Bruno (Italy)

Assistant referees:
Ludovic Cayre (France)
Tual Trainini (France)
Television match official:
Ben Whitehouse (Wales)

Notes:

- Pierre Bruno, Hame Faiva, Iliesa Ratuva Tavuyara (all Italy), Juan Manuel Alonso and Mateo Viñals (both Uruguay) made their international debuts.

20 November 2021
16:00 SAST (UTC+2)

Zimbabwe	10–41	Namibia
Try: Tshamala 36' c Con: White-Sharpley (1/1) 37'; Pen: White-Sharpley (1/2) 44'		Try: Greyling 26' m Booysen (2) 47' m, 75' c Katjijeko 54' m Louis 60' m Tromp 65' c Conradie 70' c Con: Kisting (3/5) 66', 71', 76'

Markötter Stadium, Stellenbosch, South Africa
Referee: Griffin Colby (South Africa)

Team details

FB	15	Tapiwa Mafura
RW	14	Brandon Mudzekenyedzi
OC	13	Riaan O'Neill
IC	12	Takudzwa Chieza
LW	11	Shingirai Katsvere		(substituted off) 60'
FH	10	Dundlee White-Sharpley
SH	9	Hilton Mudariki (c)		(substituted off) 66'
N8	8	Aiden Burnett		(substituted off) 79'
OF	7	Biselele Tshamala	(yellow card) 20' to 30'	(substituted off) 58'
BF	6	Godfrey Muzanargwo
RL	5	George Saungweme		(substituted off) 62'
LL	4	Sean Beevor
TP	3	Cleopas Kundiona		(substituted off) 62'
HK	2	Royal Mwale		(substituted off) 40'
LP	1	Tyron Fagan		(substituted off) 64'
Replacements:
HK	16	Deanne Makonit		(substituted on) 40'
PR	17	Victor Mapunga		(substituted on) 64'
PR	18	Bornwell Gwinji		(substituted on) 62'
LK	19	Godwin Mangenje		(substituted on) 62'
FL	20	Tonderai Chiwambutsa		(substituted on) 58'
CE	21	Keith Chiwara		(substituted on) 66'
WG	22	Martin Mangongo		(substituted on) 60'
FL	23	Jordon Coombes		(substituted on) 79'
Coach:
(Zimbabwe) Brendon Dawson

FB	15	Johann Tromp
RW	14	Oderich Mouton		(substituted off) 58'
OC	13	Johan Deysel (c)
IC	12	Danco Burger
LW	11	J. C. Greyling
FH	10	Cliven Loubser		(substituted off) 73'
SH	9	Damian Stevens		(substituted off) 52'
N8	8	Renaldo Bothma		(substituted off) 47'
OF	7	Janco Venter
BF	6	Wian Conradie	(yellow card) 34' to 44'
RL	5	Max Katjijeko		(substituted off) 55'
LL	4	P. J. van Lill
TP	3	Gerhard Opperman		(substituted off) 73'
HK	2	Louis van der Westhuizen		(substituted off) 73'
LP	1	Herschell van Wyk		(substituted off) 60'
Replacements:
HK	16	Obert Nortjé		(substituted on) 73'
PR	17	Jason Benade		(substituted on) 60'
PR	18	Chemigan Beukes		(substituted on) 73'
LK	19	Johan Retief		(substituted on) 55'
FL	20	Adriaan Booysen		(substituted on) 47'
SH	21	TC Kisting		(substituted on) 52'
FH	22	Henrique Olivier		(substituted on) 73'
FB	23	Lorenzo Louis		(substituted on) 58'
Coach:
(South Africa) Allister Coetzee

Assistant referees:
SARU Appt. (South Africa)
SARU Appt. (South Africa)

Notes:

- Chemigan Beukes (Namibia) made his international debut.
- Namibia won the Stellenbosch Challenge Cup.

20 November 2021
15:30 CET (UTC+1)

Georgia	15–15	Fiji
Pen: Abzhandadze (5/6) 6', 18', 36', 57', 64'		Try: Tuimaba 27' m Mata 68' c Con: Volavola (1/2) 69'; Pen: Volavola (1/1) 51'

Estadio El Deleite, Aranjuez, Spain
Referee: James Doleman (New Zealand)

Team details

FB	15	Davit Niniashvili
RW	14	Aka Tabutsadze
OC	13	Giorgi Kveseladze
IC	12	Merab Sharikadze (c)	(substituted off) 70'
LW	11	Alexander Todua
FH	10	Tedo Abzhandadze
SH	9	Vasil Lobzhanidze
N8	8	Beka Gorgadze
OF	7	Giorgi Tsutskiridze	(substituted off) 57'
BF	6	Beka Saghinadze
RL	5	Konstantin Mikautadze	(substituted off) 56'
LL	4	Grigor Kerdikoshvili
TP	3	Beka Gigashvili	(substituted off) 50'
HK	2	Shalva Mamukashvili	(substituted off) 50'
LP	1	Guram Gogichashvili	(substituted off) 50'	(substituted on) 62'
Replacements:
HK	16	Giorgi Chkoidze	(substituted on) 50'
PR	17	Mikheil Nariashvili	(substituted on) 50'	(substituted off) 62'
PR	18	Luka Japaridze	(substituted on) 50'
LK	19	Lasha Jaiani	(substituted on) 56'
FL	20	Tornike Jalaghonia	(substituted on) 57'
SH	21	Mikheil Alania
FH	22	Lasha Khmaladze
CE	23	Demur Tapladze	(substituted on) 70'
Coach:
(Georgia (country)) Levan Maisashvili

FB	15	Seta Tuicuvu
RW	14	Josua Tuisova
OC	13	Waisea Nayacalevu (c)
IC	12	Vilimoni Botitu	(substituted off) 73'
LW	11	Aminiasi Tuimaba
FH	10	Ben Volavola
SH	9	Frank Lomani	(substituted off) 60'
N8	8	Viliame Mata
OF	7	Mesu Kunavula	(substituted off) 50'
BF	6	Albert Tuisue
RL	5	Leone Nakarawa
LL	4	Api Ratuniyarawa	(substituted off) 53'
TP	3	Mesake Doge	(substituted off) 65'
HK	2	Sam Matavesi
LP	1	Eroni Mawi	(substituted off) 46'
Replacements:
HK	16	Zuriel Togiatama
PR	17	Peni Ravai	(substituted on) 46'
PR	18	Luke Tagi	(substituted on) 65'
LK	19	Tevita Ratuva	(substituted on) 53'
FL	20	Masivesi Dakuwaqa	(substituted on) 50'
SH	21	Moses Sorovi	(substituted on) 60'
WG	22	Nikola Matawalu
CE	23	Eneriko Buliruarua	(substituted on) 73'
Caretaker coach:
(Wales) Gareth Baber

Assistant referees:
Ben O'Keeffe (New Zealand)
Gianluca Gnecchi (Italy)
Television match official:
Stefano Penne (Italy)

Notes:

- This was the first draw between the two nations.

20 November 2021
15:15 GMT (UTC+0)

England	27–26	South Africa
Try: Tuilagi 7' c Steward 17' c Quirke 65' c Con: Smith (3/3) 8', 18', 66'; Pen: Smith (2/2) 24', 80'	Report	Try: Mapimpi 69' m Pen: Pollard (5/7) 14', 22', 26', 30', 55'; E. Jantjies (1/1) 64'; Steyn (1/1) 73'

Twickenham Stadium, London
Attendance: 81,623
Referee: Andrew Brace (Ireland)

Team details

FB	15	Freddie Steward
RW	14	Joe Marchant
OC	13	Henry Slade
IC	12	Manu Tuilagi		(substituted off) 8'
LW	11	Jonny May
FH	10	Marcus Smith
SH	9	Ben Youngs		(substituted off) 49'
N8	8	Tom Curry
OF	7	Sam Underhill		(substituted off) 54'
BF	6	Courtney Lawes (c)		(substituted off) 72'
RL	5	Jonny Hill		(substituted off) 60'
LL	4	Maro Itoje
TP	3	Kyle Sinckler		(substituted off) 55'
HK	2	Jamie Blamire		(substituted off) 60'
LP	1	Bevan Rodd		(substituted off) 48'
Replacements:
HK	16	Nic Dolly		(substituted on) 60'
PR	17	Joe Marler		(substituted on) 48'
PR	18	Will Stuart	(yellow card) 67' to 77'	(substituted on) 55'
LK	19	Charlie Ewels		(substituted on) 60'
N8	20	Sam Simmonds		(substituted on) 72'
FL	21	Alex Dombrandt		(substituted on) 54'
SH	22	Raffi Quirke		(substituted on) 49'
FB	23	Max Malins		(substituted on) 8'
Coach:
(Australia) Eddie Jones

FB	15	Willie le Roux		(substituted off) 50'
RW	14	Jesse Kriel
OC	13	Lukhanyo Am
IC	12	Damian de Allende
LW	11	Makazole Mapimpi
FH	10	Handré Pollard		(substituted off) 54'
SH	9	Cobus Reinach		(substituted off) 66'
N8	8	Duane Vermeulen
BF	7	Kwagga Smith		(substituted off) 63'
OF	6	Siya Kolisi (c)	(yellow card) 75'
RL	5	Lood de Jager		(substituted off) 63'
LL	4	Eben Etzebeth
TP	3	Trevor Nyakane		(substituted off) 44'
HK	2	Bongi Mbonambi		(substituted off) 44'
LP	1	Ox Nché		(substituted off) 44'
Replacements:
HK	16	Malcolm Marx		(substituted on) 44'
PR	17	Steven Kitshoff		(substituted on) 44'
PR	18	Vincent Koch		(substituted on) 44'
LK	19	Franco Mostert		(substituted on) 63'
N8	20	Jasper Wiese		(substituted on) 63'
SH	21	Herschel Jantjies		(substituted on) 66'
FH	22	Elton Jantjies		(substituted on) 54'
CE	23	François Steyn		(substituted on) 50'
Coach:
(South Africa) Jacques Nienaber

Player of the Match:
Freddie Steward (England)

Assistant referees:
Angus Gardner (Australia)
Frank Murphy (South Africa)
Television match official:
Brian MacNeice (Ireland)

Notes:

- Nic Dolly (England) made his international debut.

20 November 2021
17:30 EET (UTC+2)

Romania	32–20	Tonga
Try: Butnariu 12' c Surugiu 48' c Con: Boldor (2/2) 13', 50'; Pen: Boldor (2/2) 3', 7'; Plai (4/4) 55', 67', 72', 78'		Try: Latunipulu 36' c Kata 41' c Con: Faiva (2/2) 37', 43'; Pen: Faiva (2/2) 5', 15'

Stadionul Arcul de Triumf, Bucharest
Referee: AJ Jacobs (South Africa)

Team details

FB	15	Marius Simionescu
RW	14	Ionuț Dumitru
OC	13	Hinckley Vaovasa
IC	12	Vlăduț Popa
LW	11	Robert Neagu		(substituted off) 43'
FH	10	Tudor Boldor		(substituted off) 51'
SH	9	Florin Surugiu
N8	8	Cristi Chirică (c)
OF	7	Cristi Boboc
BF	6	Damian Strătilă		(substituted off) 68'
RL	5	Andrei Toader		(substituted off) 73'
LL	4	Johannes van Heerden	(yellow card) 36' to 46'
TP	3	Costel Burțilă		(substituted off) 50'
HK	2	Tudor Butnariu		(substituted off) 52'
LP	1	Vasile Bălan
Replacements:
HK	16	Florin Bărdașu		(substituted on) 52'
PR	17	Dorin Tică
PR	18	Alex Gordaș		(substituted on) 50'
LK	19	Bogdan Doroftei		(substituted on) 73'
FL	20	Kamil Sobota		(substituted on) 68'
SH	21	Gabriel Rupanu
FH	22	Daniel Plai		(substituted on) 51'
WG	23	Sioeli Lama	(yellow card) 44' to 54'	(substituted on) 43'
Coach:
(England) Andy Robinson

FB	15	Walter Fifita	(substituted off) 70'
RW	14	Latu Latunipulu
OC	13	Afusipa Taumoepeau
IC	12	Vaea Vaea
LW	11	Solomone Kata
FH	10	James Faiva
SH	9	Sonatane Takulua (c)	(substituted off) 68'
N8	8	Fotu Lokotui	(substituted off) 68'
OF	7	Mateaki Kafatolu	(substituted off) 58'
BF	6	Onehunga Havili
RL	5	Daniel Faleafa
LL	4	Leva Fifita
TP	3	Ben Tameifuna	(substituted off) 65'
HK	2	Siua Maile	(substituted off) 72'
LP	1	Siegfried Fisiihoi	(substituted off) 68'
Replacements:
HK	16	Maile Ngauamo	(substituted on) 72'
PR	17	Jethro Felemi	(substituted on) 68'
PR	18	Maʻafu Fia	(substituted on) 65'
FL	19	Michael Faleafa	(substituted on) 68'
N8	20	Sione Vailanu	(substituted on) 58'
SH	21	Leon Fukofuka	(substituted on) 68'
FH	22	Navarre Haisila
WG	23	Atu Manu	(substituted on) 70'
Caretaker coaches:
(Australia) Grant Doorey (New Zealand) John McKee

Assistant referees:
Ben Blain (Scotland)
Sam Grove-White (Scotland)
Television match official:
Ian Tempest (England)

Notes:

- Bogdan Doroftei, Sioeli Lama, Andrei Toader (all Romania) and Latu Latunipulu (Tonga) made their international debuts.
- Ionuț Dumitru (Romania) earned his 50th test cap.

20 November 2021
17:30 GMT (UTC+0)

Wales	29–28	Australia
Try: Elias 23' c Tompkins 48' c Con: Biggar (2/2) 24', 48'; Pen: Biggar (4/4) 6', 16', 38', 65'; Priestland (1/1) 80+3'	Report	Try: Kellaway 3' c White 61' c Daugunu 71' m Con: O'Connor (2/3) 4', 62'; Pen: O'Connor (2/2) 19' 28'; Beale (1/1) 78'

Millennium Stadium, Cardiff
Attendance: 68,112
Referee: Mike Adamson (Scotland)

Team details

FB	15	Liam Williams
RW	14	Louis Rees-Zammit		(substituted off) 47'
OC	13	Nick Tompkins
IC	12	Willis Halaholo
LW	11	Josh Adams
FH	10	Dan Biggar		(substituted off) 69'
SH	9	Tomos Williams		(substituted off) 69'
N8	8	Aaron Wainwright
OF	7	Taine Basham		(substituted off) 70'
BF	6	Ellis Jenkins (c)			(substituted off) 59'	(substituted on) 70'
RL	5	Seb Davies
LL	4	Adam Beard		(substituted off) 15'
TP	3	Tomas Francis		(substituted off) 51'
HK	2	Ryan Elias		(substituted off) 69'
LP	1	Wyn Jones		(substituted off) 51'	(substituted on) 59'	(substituted off) 70'
Replacements:
HK	16	Elliot Dee		(substituted on) 69'
PR	17	Gareth Thomas	(yellow card) 57' to 67'	(substituted on) 51'
PR	18	Dillon Lewis		(substituted on) 51'
LK	19	Ben Carter		(substituted on) 15'
LK	20	Christ Tshiunza		(substituted on) 70'
SH	21	Gareth Davies		(substituted on) 69'
FH	22	Rhys Priestland		(substituted on) 69'
WG	23	Johnny McNicholl		(substituted on) 47'
Coach:
(New Zealand) Wayne Pivac

FB	15	Kurtley Beale	(yellow card) 22' to 32'
RW	14	Andrew Kellaway		(substituted off) 32'
OC	13	Len Ikitau
IC	12	Hunter Paisami		(substituted off) 71'
LW	11	Filipo Daugunu
FH	10	James O'Connor
SH	9	Nic White		(substituted off) 69'
N8	8	Rob Valetini	(red card) 14'
OF	7	Pete Samu		(substituted off) 62'
BF	6	Rob Leota
RL	5	Izack Rodda
LL	4	Rory Arnold		(substituted off) 55'
TP	3	Taniela Tupou		(substituted off) 43'
HK	2	Tolu Latu		(substituted off) 43'
LP	1	James Slipper (c)		(substituted off) 62'
Replacements:
HK	16	Folau Fainga'a		(substituted on) 43'
PR	17	Angus Bell		(substituted on) 62'
PR	18	Allan Alaalatoa		(substituted on) 43'
LK	19	Will Skelton		(substituted on) 55'
N8	20	Lachlan Swinton		(substituted on) 67'
SH	21	Tate McDermott		(substituted on) 69'
CE	22	Lalakai Foketi		(substituted on) 71'
WG	23	Tom Wright		(substituted on) 32'
Coach:
(New Zealand) Dave Rennie

Player of the Match:
Taine Basham (Wales)

Assistant referees:
Mathieu Raynal (France)
Nika Amashukeli (Georgia)
Television match official:
Marius Jonker (South Africa)

Notes:

- Lalakai Foketi (Australia) made his international debut.
- Wales retained the James Bevan Trophy for the first time.
- Wales won three consecutive matches against Australia for the first time since 1975.

20 November 2021
21:00 CET (UTC+1)

France	40–25	New Zealand
Try: Mauvaka (2) 2' c, 31' c Ntamack 12' c Penaud 67' c Con: Jaminet (4/4) 3', 13', 33', 68'; Pen: Jaminet (4/4) 25', 54', 63', 80'	Report	Try: J. Barrett 46' m R. Ioane 50' c Smith 59' c Con: J. Barrett (2/3) 51', 60'; Pen: J. Barrett (2/2) 6', 9'

Stade de France, Saint-Denis
Attendance: 79,501
Referee: Wayne Barnes (England)

Team details

FB	15	Melvyn Jaminet
RW	14	Damian Penaud
OC	13	Gaël Fickou
IC	12	Jonathan Danty
LW	11	Gabin Villière
FH	10	Romain Ntamack	(substituted off) 67'
SH	9	Antoine Dupont (c)	(substituted off) 72'
N8	8	Grégory Alldritt
OF	7	Anthony Jelonch
BF	6	François Cros	(substituted off) 60'
RL	5	Paul Willemse	(substituted off) 49'
LL	4	Cameron Woki	(substituted off) 72'
TP	3	Uini Atonio	(substituted off) 47'
HK	2	Peato Mauvaka	(substituted off) 58'
LP	1	Cyril Baille	(substituted off) 48'
Replacements:
HK	16	Gaëtan Barlot	(substituted on) 58'
PR	17	Jean-Baptiste Gros	(substituted on) 48'
PR	18	Demba Bamba	(substituted on) 47'
LK	19	Romain Taofifénua	(substituted on) 49'
LK	20	Thibaud Flament	(substituted on) 60'
FL	21	Dylan Cretin	(substituted on) 72'
SH	22	Maxime Lucu	(substituted on) 72'
FH	23	Matthieu Jalibert	(substituted on) 67'
Coach:
(France) Fabien Galthié

FB	15	Jordie Barrett
RW	14	Will Jordan		(substituted off) 71'
OC	13	Rieko Ioane
IC	12	Quinn Tupaea
LW	11	George Bridge
FH	10	Richie Mo'unga		(substituted off) 71'
SH	9	Aaron Smith		(substituted off) 71'
N8	8	Ardie Savea	(yellow card) 61' to 71'	(substituted off) 71'
OF	7	Sam Cane
BF	6	Akira Ioane
RL	5	Sam Whitelock (c)		(substituted off) 64'
LL	4	Brodie Retallick
TP	3	Nepo Laulala		(substituted off) 48'
HK	2	Dane Coles		(substituted off) 48'
LP	1	Joe Moody		(substituted off) 47'
Replacements:
HK	16	Samisoni Taukei'aho		(substituted on) 48'
PR	17	George Bower		(substituted on) 47'
PR	18	Ofa Tu'ungafasi		(substituted on) 48'
LK	19	Tupou Vaa'i		(substituted on) 64'
FL	20	Shannon Frizell		(substituted on) 71'
SH	21	Brad Weber		(substituted on) 71'
FH	22	Damian McKenzie		(substituted on) 71'
CE	23	David Havili		(substituted on) 71'
Coach:
(New Zealand) Ian Foster

Player of the Match:
Melvyn Jaminet (France)

Assistant referees:
Luke Pearce (England)
Karl Dickson (England)
Television match official:
Stuart Terheege (England)

Notes:

- France regained the Dave Gallaher Trophy.
- This was France's first win over New Zealand since 2009.
- This was France's first win over New Zealand on home soil since 2000.
- France set a new record for their highest winning margin over the All Blacks.
- France went undefeated in an Autumn internationals campaign for the first time since 2012.
- New Zealand's defeat meant this was the first time since November 2002 that South Africa, Australia and New Zealand had all been defeated on the same day.

20 November 2021

Spain	Cancelled	Samoa

Estadio Nacional Complutense, Madrid

21 November 2021
14:15 WET (UTC+0)

Ireland	53–7	Argentina
Try: Van der Flier (2) 10' c, 57' c Porter 23' c Doris 36' c Sheehan 66' c Healy 72' c Beirne 75' m Con: Carbery (6/7) 11', 23', 38', 57', 67', 73'; Pen: Carbery (2/2) 6', 48'	Report	Try: M. Carreras 2' c Con: Boffelli (1/1) 3'

Aviva Stadium, Dublin
Referee: Matthew Carley (England)

Team details

FB	15	Hugo Keenan	(substituted off) 52'
RW	14	Robert Baloucoune
OC	13	Garry Ringrose
IC	12	Robbie Henshaw	(substituted off) 65'
LW	11	James Lowe
FH	10	Joey Carbery
SH	9	Conor Murray	(substituted off) 50'
N8	8	Caelan Doris
OF	7	Josh van der Flier	(substituted off) 59'
BF	6	Peter O'Mahony
RL	5	James Ryan (c)	(substituted off) 38'
LL	4	Ryan Baird
TP	3	Tadhg Furlong	(substituted off) 58'
HK	2	Rónan Kelleher	(substituted off) 50'
LP	1	Andrew Porter	(substituted off) 58'
Replacements:
HK	16	Dan Sheehan	(substituted on) 50'
PR	17	Cian Healy	(substituted on) 58'
PR	18	Tom O'Toole	(substituted on) 58'
LK	19	Tadhg Beirne	(substituted on) 38'
LK	20	Nick Timoney	(substituted on) 59'
SH	21	Craig Casey	(substituted on) 50'
FH	22	Harry Byrne	(substituted on) 52'
WG	23	Keith Earls	(substituted on) 65'
Coach:
(England) Andy Farrell

FB	15	Emiliano Boffelli
RW	14	Mateo Carreras		(substituted off) 34'
OC	13	Matías Moroni
IC	12	Jerónimo de la Fuente
LW	11	Lucio Cinti
FH	10	Santiago Carreras		(substituted off) 59'
SH	9	Tomás Cubelli		(substituted off) 46'
N8	8	Pablo Matera	(yellow card) 47' to 57'
OF	7	Marcos Kremer		(substituted off) 58'
BF	6	Santiago Grondona
RL	5	Tomás Lavanini	(red card) 59'
LL	4	Guido Petti		(substituted off) 47'
TP	3	Francisco Gómez Kodela		(substituted off) 59'
HK	2	Julián Montoya (c)		(substituted off) 74'
LP	1	Thomas Gallo		(substituted off) 46'
Replacements:
HK	16	Facundo Bosch		(substituted on) 74'
PR	17	Ignacio Calles		(substituted on) 46'
PR	18	Eduardo Bello		(substituted on) 59'
LK	19	Lucas Paulos		(substituted on) 47'
N8	20	Facundo Isa		(substituted on) 58'
SH	21	Gonzalo Bertranou		(substituted on) 46'
FH	22	Nicolás Sánchez		(substituted on) 59'
WG	23	Facundo Cordero		(substituted on) 34'
Coach:
(Argentina) Mario Ledesma

Player of the Match:
Joey Carbery (Ireland)

Assistant referees:
Christophe Ridley (England)
Adam Leal (England)
Television match official:
Tom Foley (England)

Notes:

- Iain Henderson and Jack Conan (both Ireland) were both named to start, but withdrew ahead of the game and were replaced by Ryan Baird and Peter O'Mahony, with Doris moving to Number 8. Nick Timoney came onto the bench to replace O'Mahony.
- Facundo Cordero (Argentina) made his international debut.
- Ireland scored their most points against Argentina and set a new record for their largest winning margin over the Pumas.
- Tomás Lavanini (Argentina) became the first player to be shown three red cards in his international career.

=== 26/27 November ===
26 November 2021
15:00 MSK (UTC+3)

Russia	27–42	Chile
Try: Panarin 14' m Semikov (2) 58' c, 72' m Kireev 78' c Con: Kushnarev (2/4) 59', 79'; Pen: Kushnarev (1/1) 30'	Report	Try: Torrealba (2) 26' c, 61' c Sigren 35' c Larenas 38' m Casas 49' m A. Escobar 80' m Con: Videla (3/6) 27', 35', 63'; Pen: Videla (2/2) 11', 18'

Yug Sport Stadium, Sochi
Referee: Adam Jones (Wales)

Team details

FB	15	Gleb Farkov
RW	14	Khetag Dzobelov	(yellow card) 43' to 53'
OC	13	Denis Semikov
IC	12	Kirill Golosnitsky
LW	11	Viktor Telnov		(substituted off) 41'
FH	10	Yuri Kushnarev
SH	9	Stepan Khokhlov		(substituted off) 40'
N8	8	Nikita Vavilin		(substituted off) 68'
OF	7	Kirill Panarin		(substituted off) 43'
BF	6	Vitaly Zhivatov (c)
RL	5	Igor Zykov
LL	4	Alexander Ilin		(substituted off) 68'
TP	3	Vladimir Podrezov		(substituted off) 68'
HK	2	Dmitry Parkhomenko		(substituted off) 59'
LP	1	Alexei Skobiola		(substituted off) 50'
Replacements:
HK	16	Alexander Ivanov		(substituted on) 59'
PR	17	Valery Morozov		(substituted on) 50'
PR	18	Anton Drozdov		(substituted on) 68'
LK	19	Bogdan Kireev		(substituted on) 68'
FL	20	Ivan Chepraga		(substituted on) 68'
SH	21	Denis Barabantsev		(substituted on) 40'
FB	22	Alexei Golov		(substituted on) 41'
FL	23	Pavel Kirillov		(substituted on) 43'
Coach:
(Wales) Lyn Jones

FB	15	Santiago Videla
RW	14	Nicolás Garafulic			(substituted off) 78'
OC	13	Domingo Saavedra	(yellow card) 57' to 67'
IC	12	José Ignacio Larenas		(substituted off) 56'
LW	11	Pablo Casas
FH	10	Rodrigo Fernández
SH	9	Marcelo Torrealba		(substituted off) 68'
N8	8	Alfonso Escobar
OF	7	Thomas Orchard		(substituted off) 57'
BF	6	Martín Sigren (c)		(substituted off) 68'
RL	5	Augusto Sarmiento		(substituted off) 68'
LL	4	Clemente Saavedra
TP	3	Matías Dittus		(substituted off) 68'	(substituted on) 78'
HK	2	Tomás Dussaillant		(substituted off) 46'
LP	1	Vittorio Lastra		(substituted off) 46'
Replacements:
HK	16	Augusto Böhme	(yellow card) 64' to 74'	(substituted on) 46'
PR	17	Javier Carrasco		(substituted on) 46'
PR	18	Salvador Lues	(yellow card) 76'	(substituted on) 68'
LK	19	Santiago Pedrero		(substituted on) 68'
FL	20	Diego Escobar		(substituted on) 68'
FL	21	Raimundo Martínez		(substituted on) 57'
WG	22	Iñaki Ayarza		(substituted on) 56'
SH	23	Lukas Carvallo		(substituted on) 68'
Coach:
(Uruguay) Pablo Lemoine

Assistant referees:
Chris Busby (Ireland)
Manuel Bottino (Italy)
Television match official:
Sean Brickell (Wales)

Notes:

- Gleb Farkov, Bogdan Kireev, Pavel Kirillov, Kirill Panarin, Viktor Telnov (all Russia), Lukas Carvallo, Diego Escobar and Santiago Pedrero (all Chile) made their international debuts.
- This was Chile's biggest winning margin over Russia.

27 November 2021
14:30 GMT (UTC+00)

Barbarians	Cancelled (Note: Cancelled 90 minutes before kick-off following positive COVID-19 results within the Barbarians team taken 24 hours before the game.)	Samoa XV

Twickenham Stadium, London
Referee: Craig Evans (Wales)

Team details (named before cancellation)

FB	15	(Australia) Tom Wright
RW	14	(Argentina) Marcos Moneta
OC	13	(Australia) Len Ikitau
IC	12	(Japan) Ryoto Nakamura
LW	11	(Australia) Filipo Daugunu
FH	10	(Australia) James O'Connor
SH	9	(Australia) Nic White
N8	8	(South Africa) Duane Vermeulen
OF	7	(Australia) Pete Samu
BF	6	(Scotland) Ryan Wilson (c)
RL	5	(Japan) Naohiro Kotaki
LL	4	(Australia) Rob Leota
TP	3	(Japan) Shinnosuke Kakinaga
HK	2	(South Africa) Malcolm Marx
LP	1	(South Africa) Steven Kitshoff
Replacements:
HK	16	(Japan) Kosuke Horikoshi
PR	17	(Australia) Angus Bell
PR	18	(Georgia (country)) Giorgi Kharaishvili
LK	19	(Argentina) Rodrigo Fernández Criado
FL	20	(England) Olly Robinson
SH	21	(Australia) Tate McDermott
CE	22	(Australia) Izaia Perese
FB	23	(Ireland) Rob Kearney
Coach:
(New Zealand) Dave Rennie

FB	15	Jamie-Jerry Taulagi
RW	14	Elijah Niko
OC	13	Ope Peleseuma
IC	12	Taiso Silafai Leaana
LW	11	Sinoti Sinoti
FH	10	AJ Alatimu
SH	9	Nigel Hunt
N8	8	Abraham Papali'i
OF	7	Tala Gray
BF	6	Mikaele Tapili
RL	5	Joe Tekori
LL	4	Ben Nee-Nee
TP	3	Paul Alo-Emile (c)
HK	2	John Ulugia
LP	1	Aki Seiuli
Replacements:
HK	16	Albert Onele'i
PR	17	Sakaria Taulafo
PR	18	Michael Alaalatoa
LK	19	Salo Tutaia
LK	20	Senio Toleafoa
SH	21	Reece Anapu
CE	22	Aviata Silago
WG	23	Alex Luatua
Coaches:
(Samoa) Tusi Pisi (Samoa) Census Johnston

Assistant referees:
Mathieu Raynal (France)
Pierre Brousset (France)
Television match official:
Eric Gauzins (France)

== See also ==
- 2021 July rugby union tests
- 2021 World Rugby Americas Pacific Challenge
- 2021–22 Rugby Europe season
- Toyota Challenge
