= Tudor Butnariu =

Romanian rugby union football player

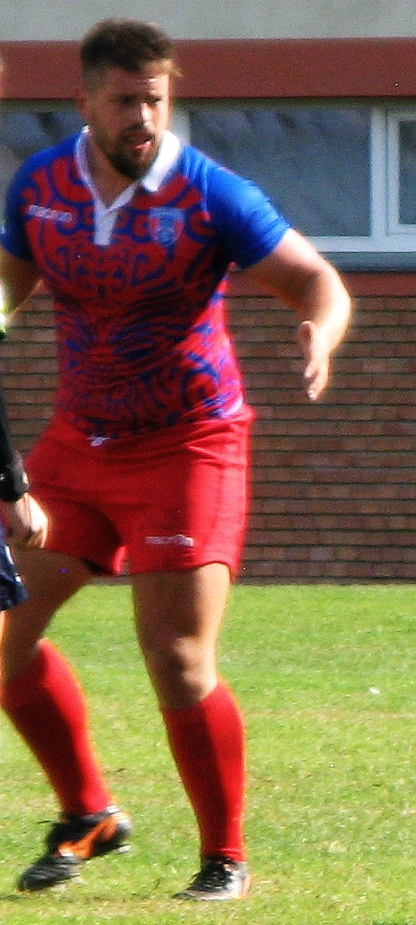
- Tudor Butnariu during a Steaua match in 2018
- Full name: Tudor Gabriel Butnariu
- Born: 12 March 1995 (age 31) Iași, Romania
- Height: 1.80 m (5 ft 11 in)
- Weight: 100 kg (15 st 10 lb; 220 lb)

Rugby union career
- Position: Hooker
- Current team: Steaua
Youth career
- –2015: Club Sportiv Școlar Unirea Iași
Senior career
Years	Team	Apps	(Points)
2015–2018	Politehnica Iași	11	(0)
2018–	Steaua București	0	(0)
- Correct as of 23 September 2017
International career
Years	Team	Apps	(Points)
2014–2015	Romania U-20	6	
2021–present	Romania	1	(0)
- Correct as of 7 November 2021

Tudor Gabriel Butnariu (born 12 March 1995) is a Romanian rugby union player. He plays as a hooker for professional SuperLiga club Steaua București.

== Career ==
Butnariu played during his career for Politehnica Iași from where he transferred to Steaua in 2018. He also played for the Romania national under-20 rugby union team.

== International career ==
Butnariu has also been selected for Romania's national team, the Oaks, making his international debut during the 3rd week of 2021 Autumn Nations Series in a test match against Los Teros on 7 November 2021.
