= Setefano Funaki =

Tongan rugby union player

- Born: 8 August 1992 (age 34) Tonga
- Height: 1.93 m (6 ft 4 in)
- Weight: 114 kg (18.0 st; 251 lb)

Rugby union career
- Position(s): Lock, Flanker
Senior career
Years	Team	Apps	(Points)
2019–2021	Northland	10	(0)
2022	Seattle Seawolves	8	(0)
- Correct as of 3 July 2022
International career
Years	Team	Apps	(Points)
2021	Tonga	3	(0)
- Correct as of 3 July 2022

Setefano Funaki (born 8 August 1992) is a Tongan rugby union player. His position is lock or flanker.

== Professional career ==
Funaki signed for Major League Rugby side Seattle Seawolves for the 2022 Major League Rugby season.

Funaki debuted for Tonga against Scotland during the 2021 end-of-year rugby union internationals.
