= Foster DeWitt =

Canada international rugby union player

- Born: 26 May 1996 (age 30) British Columbia, Canada
- Height: 1.85 m (6 ft 1 in)
- Weight: 107 kg (16.8 st; 236 lb)
- University: University of British Columbia

Rugby union career
- Position: Hooker / Prop
Senior career
Years	Team	Apps	(Points)
2022–	New England Free Jacks	46	(15)
- Correct as of 6 February 2022
International career
Years	Team	Apps	(Points)
2021–	Canada	7	(0)
- Correct as of 6 February 2022

Foster DeWitt (born 26 May 1996) is a Canadian rugby union player, currently playing for the New England Free Jacks of Major League Rugby (MLR) and the Canada national team. His preferred position is hooker or prop.

== Early life ==
Born in British Columbia DeWitt grew up in Courtenay. He played his high school rugby at G.P Vanier in Courtenay BC, and his Canadian Club Rugby for Westshore Rugby Club in Victoria BC. He would attend the University of British Columbia playing for the schools rugby team.

== Professional career ==
DeWitt would play for the Pacific Pride program before getting signed by the Free Jacks.

DeWitt signed for Major League Rugby side New England Free Jacks for the 2022 Major League Rugby season.

International

Dewitt would represent Canadas U18 side.

DeWitt debuted for Canada national team against Belgium during the 2021 end-of-year rugby union internationals.

== Honours ==
New England Free Jacks

- Major League Rugby Championship: x3 (2023, 2024, 2025)
