= Ivan Nemer =

Italy international rugby union player

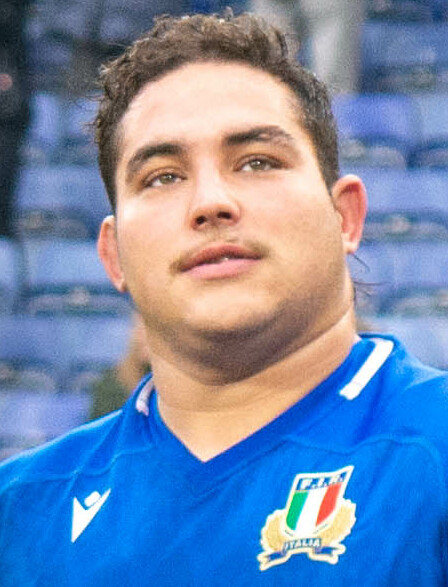
- Nemer in 2022
- Born: 22 April 1998 (age 28) Mar del Plata, Argentina
- Height: 180 cm (5 ft 11 in)
- Weight: 116 kg (256 lb; 18 st 4 lb)

Rugby union career
- Position: Prop
- Current team: Benetton
Youth career
- Biguá Rugby Club
- –: Sporting Club Mar del Plata,
Senior career
Years	Team	Apps	(Points)
2020	Rugby Casale		
2020–	Benetton	41	(10)
- Correct as of 17 Dec 2022
International career
Years	Team	Apps	(Points)
2018	Argentina U20		
2021–	Italy	16	(0)
- Correct as of 29 Sep 2023

Ivan Nemer (born 22 April 1998) is a professional rugby union player who plays as a prop for Benetton of the United Rugby Championship. He was banned by the club for his racist attitude from January 2023 to June 2023. He has also represented Italy at international level, having made his test debut against New Zealand during the 2021 Autumn Nations Series. Nemer has previously played for clubs such as Mar del Plata in the past.

== Professional career ==
On 31 October 2021, he was selected by Kieran Crowley to be part of Italy 34-man squad for the 2021 end-of-year rugby union internationals. He made his debut against All Blacks.

Nemer gave a banana peel to his national teammate, Cherif Traoré. He was disqualified for six months by the federal judges. During the suspension, he was ordered to work on the FIR Migrants Project. He waived his right to appeal the sentence.

On 22 August 2023, he was named in the Italy's 33-man squad for the 2023 Rugby World Cup.

== Personal life ==
Born and raised in Argentina, Nemer is of Italian descent via a grandparent.
