= Apisai Naqalevu =

Fijian rugby player (born 1989)

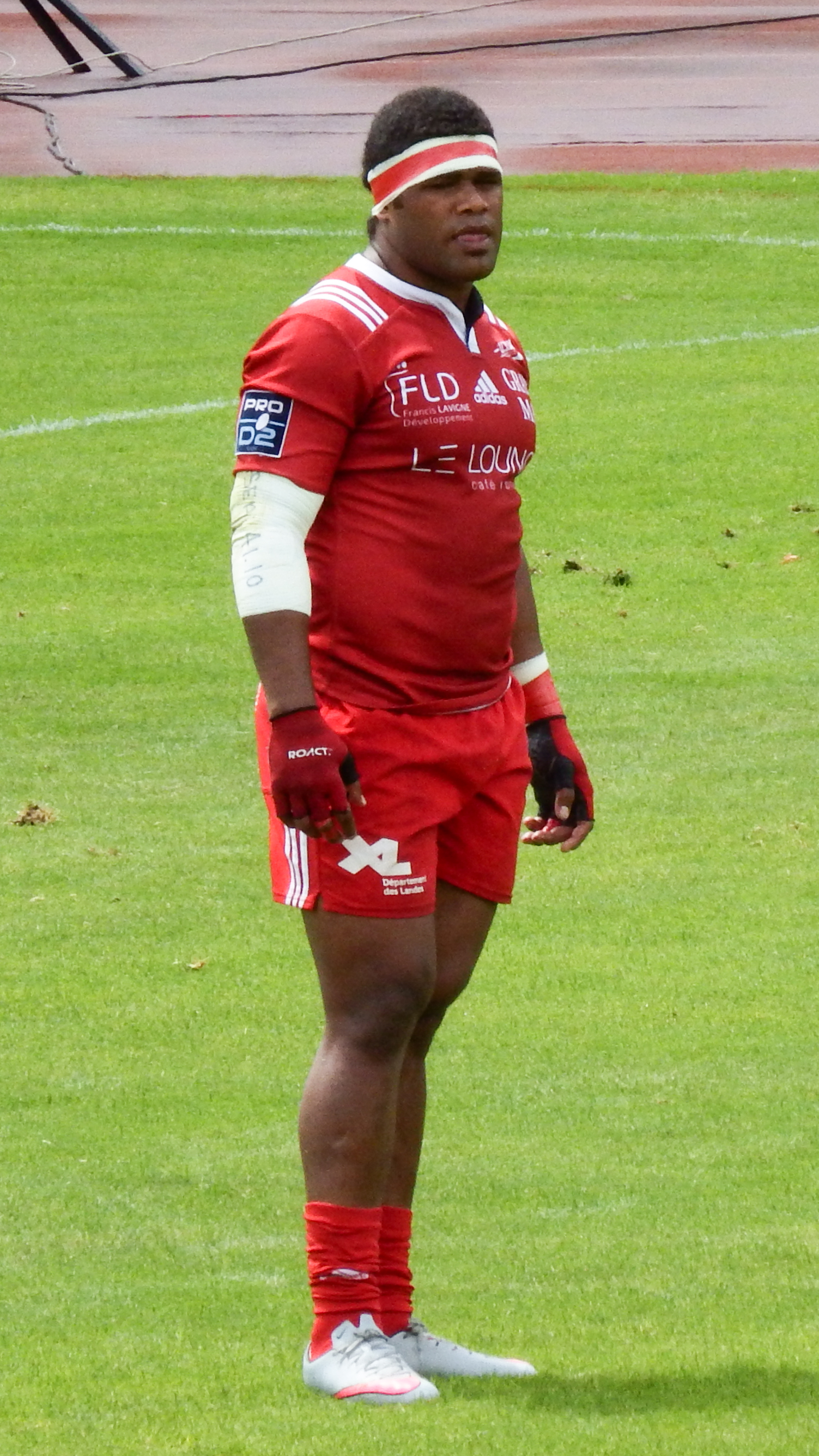
- Born: 21 August 1989 (age 37) Botenaulu, Fiji
- Height: 1.84 m (6 ft 0 in)
- Weight: 104 kg (16 st 5 lb)
- School: Muaira District School

Rugby union career
- Position(s): Wing, Centre
Senior career
Years	Team	Apps	(Points)
2015-2017	US Dax	46	(50)
2017-2018	Union Bordeaux Bègles	20	(15)
2018-	Clermont Auvergne	60	(70)
2013	Fiji Warriors	1	(0)
National sevens team
Years	Team		Comps
2014	Fiji		

Apisai Naqalevu, or Apisai Naqaliva, (born 21 August 1989) is a Fijian rugby union and rugby sevens player who plays as a centre.

== Biography ==
He was born in the Naitasiri province, in the village of Botenaulu. He began playing rugby at the age of nine with the Muaira District School in Naitasiri. He represents the Suva team in the Digicel Cup that he won in 2012. He worked in his country as a police officer.

He married his girlfriend in August 2022.
