= Mateaki Kafatolu =

New Zealand rugby union player

- Full name: Mateaki Kafatolu
- Born: 11 August 1989 (age 37) New Zealand
- Height: 1.83 m (6 ft 0 in)
- Weight: 103 kg (16 st 3 lb; 227 lb)

Rugby union career
- Position: Flanker
- Current team: Sunwolves
Senior career
Years	Team	Apps	(Points)
2017–	Wellington	28	(15)
2020–	Sunwolves	0	(0)
- Correct as of 16 December 2019

Mateaki Kafatolu (マテアキ・カファトル, Mateaki kafatoru; born 11 August 1989) is a New Zealand rugby union player who plays as a Flanker. He currently plays for Sunwolves in Super Rugby.

In July 2021, Kafatolu was named in the Tonga squad for the July internationals.
