= Henry Spring (rugby union) =

- Full name: Henry Robert Spring
- Born: 14 March 2001 (age 25) Suva, Fiji
- Height: 6 ft 1 in (185 cm)
- Weight: 231 lb (105 kg)

Rugby union career
- Position: Forward
International career
| Years | Team | Apps | (Points) |
| 2021 | Fiji | 1 | (0) |

Henry Robert Spring (born 14 March 2001) is a Fijian international rugby union player

Born in Suva, Spring is the fourth oldest of seven siblings and attended Queen Victoria School, which he captained to an under-15s Deans Cup title in 2015, before taking up a scholarship to France as a 16-year old.

Spring played with Stade Français from 2019 to 2023. He was called into the Fijian squad touring Europe in 2021, as a development opportunity, and made his international debut against Spain in Madrid, coming on off the bench to replace hooker Sam Matavesi for the final 15 minutes of the match.

== See also ==
- List of Fiji national rugby union players
