= Lockie Kratz =

Canadian rugby union player

Lachlan (Lockie) Kratz
- Born: 27 March 2000 (age 26) San Diego, California, U.S.
- Height: 181 cm (5 ft 11 in)
- Weight: 88 kg (194 lb; 13 st 12 lb)
- University: University of Victoria

Rugby union career
- Position: Centre
Senior career
Years	Team	Apps	(Points)
2021–2024	New Orleans Gold	6	(0)
- Correct as of 10 July 2021
International career
Years	Team	Apps	(Points)
2018–2019	Canada U20s	8	(15)
2021–	Canada Canada	1	(170)
- Correct as of 10 July 2021
Medal record
Men's rugby sevens
Representing Canada
Pan American Games
Bronze medal – third place	2023 Santiago	Team

Lockie Kratz (born 27 March 2000) is a Canadian rugby union player, currently playing for the New Orleans Gold of Major League Rugby (MLR) and the Canadian national team. His preferred position is centre.

== Early life ==
Kratz was born in San Diego, California, and raised in Victoria, British Columbia. He attended Oak Bay High School, helping the rugby team win a provincial rugby championship. Kratz then played college rugby for the Victoria Vikes.

== Professional career ==
Kratz signed for Major League Rugby side New Orleans Gold for the 2021 Major League Rugby season after a successful trial period, becoming the youngest member of the roster. Kratz made his debut for Canada in the 2021 July rugby union tests.

== Personal life ==
Kratz has an older brother, Gavin, who also plays rugby. His grandfather, Jim Gallagher, played for the North Sydney Rugby Club and captained the Australia national under-20 rugby union team. Kratz is a dual citizen of the United States and Canada.
