= Latu Latunipulu =

Tongan rugby union player

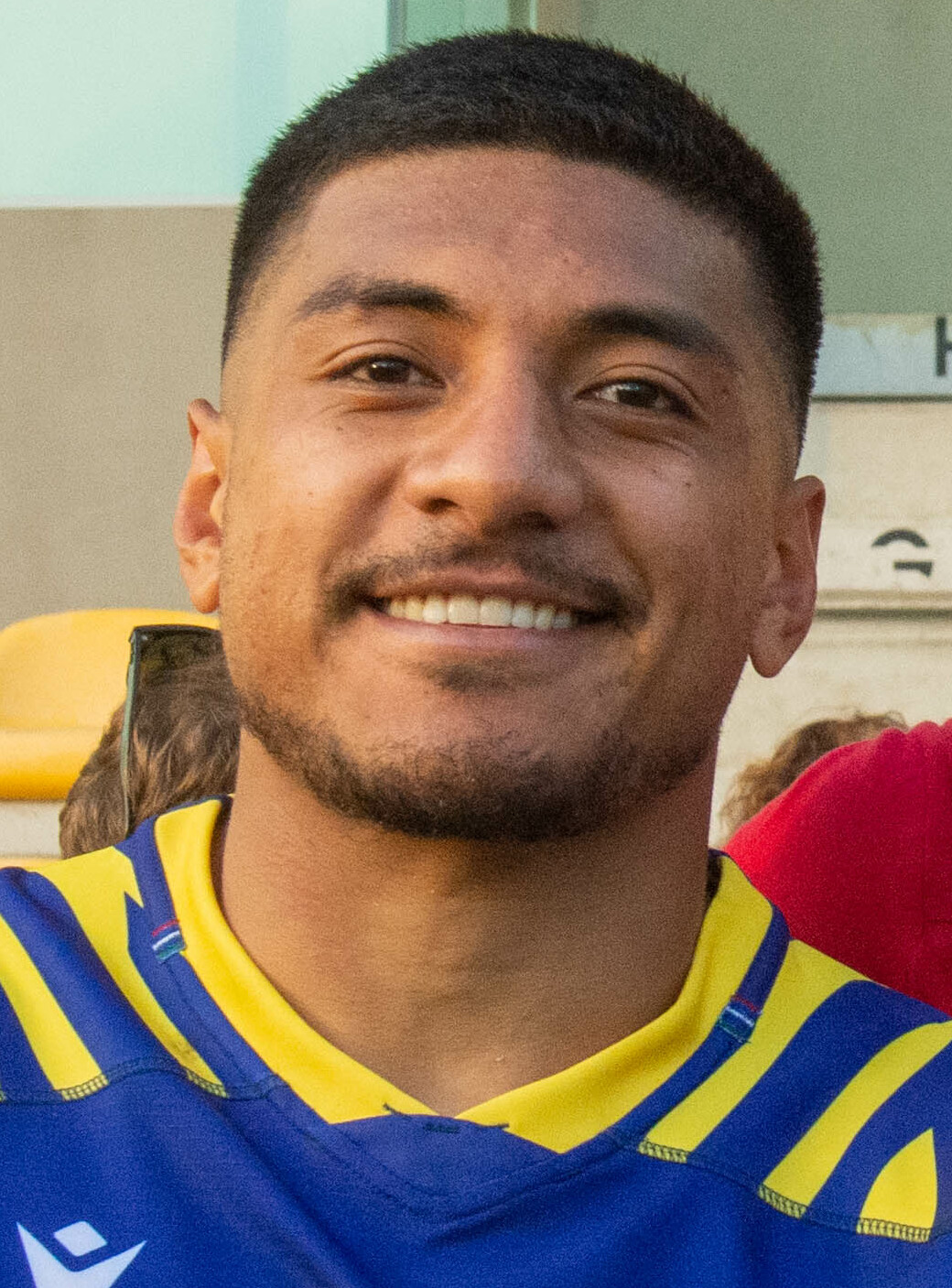
- Latunipulu in 2022
- Born: Latu Fonomanu Latunipulu; 12 March 1997 (age 29) Sydney, Australia
- Height: 1.81 m (5 ft 11 1/2 in)
- Weight: 101 kg (223 lb; 15 st 13 lb)

Rugby union career
- Position: Wing
Amateur team(s)
Years	Team	Apps	(Points)
- Sylvania Bulldog
- Correct as of 28 September 2022
Senior career
Years	Team	Apps	(Points)
2015–2018	Randwick	35	(60)
2017–2018	Sydney	10	(40)
2019–2020	Bayonne	20	(10)
2021	Valence Romans	2	(0)
2021–2022	Bourg-en-Bresse	11	(5)
2022	Zebre Parma	4	(0)
- Correct as of 10 Dec 2022
International career
Years	Team	Apps	(Points)
2021–	Tonga	1	(5)
- Correct as of 20 Nov 2021

Latu Latunipulu (born 12 March 1997) is an Australian-born Tongan rugby union player. His preferred position is wing. He is a Tongan international.

== Career ==
Latunipulu was born in Australia, and played for the Randwick club in the Shute Shield, where his performances earned him a call-up to the Australia U20 side, although he did not feature due to injury. While playing for Randwick, he also featured for Sydney in the National Rugby Championship. Latunipulu moved to France in 2019, first representing Bayonne, winning the PROD2 championship to TOP14 before playing at Valence Romans and Bourg-en-Bresse. In September 2022, he moved to Italy to join United Rugby Championship side Zebre Parma as Joker Medicale until December 2022.

== International career ==
While at Bourg-en-Bresse, he made his international debut for Tonga against the French Barbarians in 2021 and later against Romania, scoring a try.
