= Jamie Hodgson =

Scotland international rugby union player

- Born: James Walker Hodgson; 19 March 1998 (age 28) Livingston, Scotland
- Height: 1.97 m (6 ft 6 in)
- Weight: 120 kg (265 lb)
- School: Stewart's Melville College

Rugby union career
- Position: Lock
- Current team: Newcastle Red Bulls
Senior career
Years	Team	Apps	(Points)
2018–2025	Edinburgh	70	(5)
2025	→ Bristol Bears (loan)	4	(0)
2025-	Newcastle Red Bulls	0	(0)
- Correct as of 7 August 2025
International career
Years	Team	Apps	(Points)
2017–2018	Scotland U20s	9	(0)
2021–2022	Scotland	5	(0)
2022	Scotland 'A'	1	(0)
- Correct as of 13 April 2023

Jamie Hodgson (born 19 March 1998) is a Scottish rugby union player who plays for Newcastle Red Bulls in the Gallagher Premiership.

== Rugby Union career ==
=== Professional career ===
Hodgson made his debut for Edinburgh on 26 October 2018. In December 2024 Hodgson was signed by Bristol Bears on a short-term loan from Edinburgh as injury cover.

On 1 August 2025, Hodgson would move to England to join Newcastle Red Bulls in the Premiership Rugby for the 2025–26 season.

=== International career ===
In June 2021 Hodgson was called up to the Scotland squad for the Summer internationals.

He made his Scotland debut against Tonga on 30 October 2021. Scotland won the match 60–14.
