= Navarre Haisila =

Australian rugby union player

- Born: 1999 (age 26–27) Australia
- Height: 182 cm (6 ft 0 in)
- Weight: 95 kg (14 st 13 lb; 209 lb)
- School: Hallam Senior College

Rugby union career
- Position: Fly-half / Centre / Wing
Senior career
Years	Team	Apps	(Points)
2019–	Melbourne Rising	4	(5)
Super Rugby
Years	Team	Apps	(Points)
2019	Rebels	0	(0)

Navarre Haisila is an Australian rugby union player who played for the Rebels in the Super Rugby competition. He can play multiple positions including Fly-half, centre and wing. He played for Melbourne Rising under National Rugby Championship.
