= 2021 July rugby union tests =

Rugby union matches

The 2021 mid-year rugby union internationals (also known as the summer internationals in the Northern Hemisphere) were a series of international rugby union matches. Due to ongoing restrictions around the world due to the COVID-19 pandemic, a number of matches were cancelled, and some series moved so that the Northern Hemisphere nations hosted the matches, and some teams played for the first time since their final matches of the 2019 Rugby World Cup.

The window was highlighted by the 2021 British & Irish Lions tour to South Africa, which included a three-test series between the Lions and South Africa. Ahead of the tour, the Lions hosted their first home match since 2005, against Japan in Scotland, while South Africa were scheduled to host a two-test series against Georgia; the first time the teams had met outside the Rugby World Cup. The second test of this series was cancelled. Japan went on to play Ireland. Ireland also played the United States, having had to adapt their summer tour after their test series away to Fiji was cancelled. To replace Ireland's tour, Fiji traveled to New Zealand for a first ever test series against the All Blacks, who also hosted Tonga. Tonga began their preparation for their 2023 Rugby World Cup qualification series against Samoa, and Samoa used a two-match series against the Māori All Blacks as their preparation. The three-test series between Australia and France was condensed to take place within 11 days, due to French club commitments and a hotel quarantine period for the France team. Australia go on to play New Zealand in the first Bledisloe Cup match of the year.

England and Wales's summer tours were reversed, as England welcomed Canada and the United States, and Wales hosted Argentina. Wales, who were originally meant to play Uruguay as part of their South America tour, instead played Canada ahead of their two-test series against Argentina. Argentina also prepared for the series with a first visit to Bucharest since 1992 to play Romania, which replaced Argentina's cancelled home game against Georgia. Romania were scheduled to face Scotland for the first time since 2011 and Scotland were also due to play Georgia as part of their Eastern Europe tour, but both matches were cancelled.

The window also contained a number of other 2023 Rugby World Cup qualification warm-ups as Uruguay played an Argentina XV, the Cook Islands played a Tasman Mako HP XV and the New Zealand U20 team, and Zimbabwe played Zambia. Zimbabwe were also scheduled to play Portugal, but the match was cancelled.

== Series ==
| Series | Result | Winner |
|---|---|---|
| South Africa–British & Irish Lions Test series | 2–1 | South Africa |
| New Zealand–Fiji Test series | 2–0 | New Zealand |
| Australia–France Test series | 2–1 | Australia |
| South Africa–Georgia Test series | 1–0 (Note: Second Test was cancelled due to the impact of the COVID-19 pandemic.) | South Africa |
| Wales–Argentina Test series | 1–0 (Note: First test was a drawn result; second test was won by Argentina.) | Argentina |

== Fixtures ==
=== 2 June ===
2 June 2021
15:00 CAT (UTC+02)

| Zimbabwe | 31–8 | Zambia |
| Try: Mudzekenyedzi 12' m Juszczyk (2) 21' c, 52' c Chiwambutsa 28' m Burnett 34' m Con: Mudariki (3/5) 22', 35', 53' | Report | Try: Chisenga 35' m Pen: Mwashi (1/1) 79' |

Police Grounds, Harare
Attendance: 0
Referee: ZRU Appt. (Zimbabwe)

=== 5 June ===
5 June 2021
15:00 CAT (UTC+02)

| Zimbabwe | 56–3 | Zambia |
| Try: Mangongo 9' m Katsevere (4) 32' m, 45' m, 48' m, 55' m Chiwara (2) 57' m, 74' c Mudariki 62' c Mudzekenyedzi 65' m Tshamala 72' c Con: Mandivenga (1/4) 62'; White Sharpley (2/2) 73', 75' | Report | Pen: Koloko (1/3) 12' |

Police Grounds, Harare
Attendance: 0
Referee: Paul Mente (South Africa)

=== 12 June ===
12 June 2021
15:35 JST (UTC+09)

| Japan XV | 32–17 | (Japan) Sunwolves |
| Try: Horikoshi (2) 60' c, 80' c Nakamura 65' c Tatafu 71' m Con: Matsuda (3/4) 62', 66', 80+1'; Pen: Tamura (1/2) 31'; Matsuda (1/1) 76' | Report | Try: Arai 19' c Takeyama 39' c Con: Yamasawa (2/2) 21', 40+1'; Pen: Takeyama (1/1) 68' |

Shizuoka Stadium, Shizuoka
Attendance: 18,434
Referee: Shuhei Kubo (Japan)

Team details

| FB | 15 | Ryohei Yamanaka |
| RW | 14 | Lomano Lemeki |
| OC | 13 | Timothy Lafaele | (substituted off) 56' |
| IC | 12 | Ryoto Nakamura |
| LW | 11 | Gerhard van den Heever | (substituted off) 40' |
| FH | 10 | Yu Tamura | (substituted off) 51' |
| SH | 9 | Kaito Shigeno | (substituted off) 51' |
| N8 | 8 | Amanaki Mafi |
| OF | 7 | Naoki Ozawa | | (substituted off) 60' |
| BF | 6 | Michael Leitch (c) | (substituted off) 51' |
| RL | 5 | James Moore | (substituted off) 51' |
| LL | 4 | Wimpie van der Walt | (substituted off) 40' | (substituted on) 60' |
| TP | 3 | Asaeli Ai Valu | (substituted off) 54' |
| HK | 2 | Atsushi Sakate | (substituted off) 54' |
| LP | 1 | Keita Inagaki | (substituted off) 40' |
Replacements:
| HK | 16 | Kosuke Horikoshi | (substituted on) 54' |
| PR | 17 | Craig Millar | (substituted on) 40' |
| PR | 18 | Shinnosuke Kakinaga | (substituted on) 54' |
| LK | 19 | Jack Cornelsen | (substituted on) 40' |
| FL | 20 | Tevita Tatafu | (substituted on) 51' |
| FL | 21 | Lappies Labuschagné | (substituted on) 51' |
| SH | 22 | Naoto Saito | (substituted on) 51' |
| FH | 23 | Rikiya Matsuda | (substituted on) 51' |
| CE | 24 | Shane Gates | (substituted on) 56' |
| WG | 25 | Siosaia Fifita | (substituted on) 40' |
Coach:
(New Zealand) Jamie Joseph

| FB | 15 | (Japan) Ryuji Noguchi | (substituted off) 31' | (substituted on) 40' |
| RW | 14 | (Japan) Taichi Takahashi |
| OC | 13 | (Australia) Dylan Riley |
| IC | 12 | (Japan) Yusuke Kajimura | (substituted off) 59' | (substituted on) 67' |
| LW | 11 | (Japan) Seiya Ozaki | | | (substituted off) 54' |
| FH | 10 | (Japan) Takuya Yamasawa | (substituted off) 48' | (substituted on) 62' |
| SH | 9 | (Japan) Kouki Arai | (substituted off) 48' | (substituted on) 62' |
| N8 | 8 | (Japan) Ben Gunter | | | | (substituted off) 65' | (substituted on) 67' |
| OF | 7 | (Australia) Ed Quirk (c) | | | (substituted off) 52' | (substituted on) 65' |
| BF | 6 | (New Zealand) Liaki Moli | (substituted off) 33' | (substituted on) 40' |
| RL | 5 | (Japan) Uwe Helu | | | (substituted off) 31' | (substituted on) 40' | (substituted off) 67' | (substituted on) 74' |
| LL | 4 | (Japan) Ryota Hasegawa | 22' to 27' | | | | (substituted off) 62' |
| TP | 3 | (Japan) Kengo Kitagawa | (substituted off) 55' | (substituted on) 65' |
| HK | 2 | (Japan) Yusuke Niwai | (substituted off) 40' | (substituted on) 65' | (substituted off) 67' |
| LP | 1 | (Japan) Yukio Morikawa | (substituted off) 31' | (substituted on) 62' |
Replacements:
| HK | 16 | (Japan) Yoshikatsu Hikosaka | (substituted on) 40' | (substituted off) 65' | (substituted on) 67' |
| PR | 17 | (Japan) Shogo Miura | (substituted on) 31' | (substituted off) 62' |
| PR | 18 | (Japan) Shunsuke Asaoka | (substituted on) 55' | (substituted off) 65' |
| LK | 19 | (Japan) Daichi Akiyama | (substituted on) 22' | (substituted off) 27' | (substituted on) 31' | (substituted off) 40' | (substituted on) 62' | (substituted off) 74' |
| FL | 20 | (Japan) Shunsuke Nunomaki | (substituted on) 33' | (substituted off) 40' | (substituted on) 52' |
| SH | 21 | (Japan) Daiki Nakajima | (substituted on) 48' | (substituted off) 62' |
| FH | 22 | (Japan) Doga Maeda | (substituted on) 48' | (substituted off) 62' |
| CE | 23 | (Japan) Kanta Shikao | (substituted on) 59' | (substituted off) 67' |
| WG | 24 | (Japan) Koki Takeyama | (substituted on) 31' | (substituted off) 40' | (substituted on) 54' |
Coach:
(Japan) Naoya Okubo

Assistant referees:
JRFU Appt. (Japan)
JRFU Appt. (Japan)
Television match official:
JRFU Appt. (Japan)

12 June 2021

| Zimbabwe | Cancelled (Note: Cancelled following COVID-19 continued restrictions in Namibia.) | Namibia |

Police Grounds, Harare

=== 19 June ===
19 June 2021

| Namibia | Cancelled (Note: Cancelled following COVID-19 continued restrictions in Namibia.) | Zimbabwe |

Hage Geingob Rugby Stadium, Windhoek

=== 26/27 June ===
26 June 2021
19:05 NZST (UTC+12)

| Māori All Blacks | 35–10 | Samoa |
| Try: Stevenson 9' c, 38' c Wainui 32' c Dixon 57' c Douglas 67'; Con: Black (3/3) 10' 33', 39' c Ioane (2/2) 58', 68' | Report | Try: Foma'i 24'; Con: Iona (1/1) 25'; Pen: Iona (1/1) 46' |

Wellington Regional Stadium, Wellington
Attendance: 0
Referee: Nic Berry (Australia)

Team details

| FB | 15 | Kaleb Trask |
| RW | 14 | Shaun Stevenson | (substituted off) 61' |
| OC | 13 | Billy Proctor |
| IC | 12 | Alex Nankivell |
| LW | 11 | Sean Wainui |
| FH | 10 | Otere Black | (substituted off) 51' |
| SH | 9 | Bryn Hall | (substituted off) 57' |
| N8 | 8 | Whetu Douglas |
| OF | 7 | Billy Harmon | (substituted off) 68' |
| BF | 6 | Reed Prinsep |
| RL | 5 | Isaia Walker-Leawere | (substituted off) 57' |
| LL | 4 | Manaaki Selby-Rickit |
| TP | 3 | Josh Hohneck | (substituted off) 57' |
| HK | 2 | Ash Dixon (c) | (substituted off) 57' |
| LP | 1 | Pouri Rakete-Stones | (substituted off) 51' |
Replacements:
| HK | 16 | Kurt Eklund | (substituted on) 57' |
| PR | 17 | Tamaiti Williams | (substituted on) 50' |
| PR | 18 | Marcel Renata | (substituted on) 57' |
| LK | 19 | Josh Dickson | (substituted on) 57' |
| FL | 20 | Jacob Norris | (substituted on) 68' |
| SH | 21 | Sam Nock | (substituted on) 57' |
| FH | 22 | Josh Ioane | (substituted on) 50' |
| WG | 23 | Jonah Lowe | (substituted on) 61' |
Coach:
(New Zealand) Clayton McMillan

| FB | 15 | Tomasi Alosio | (substituted off) 68' |
| RW | 14 | Johnny Vaili |
| OC | 13 | Losi Filipo | (substituted off) 50' |
| IC | 12 | Henry Taefu |
| LW | 11 | Neria Foma'i |
| FH | 10 | Rodney Iona |
| SH | 9 | Dwayne Polataivao | (substituted off) 59' |
| N8 | 8 | Olajuwon Noa | (substituted off) 59' |
| OF | 7 | Jack Lam (c) |
| BF | 6 | Henry Stowers |
| RL | 5 | Samuel Slade |
| LL | 4 | Ben Nee-Nee | (substituted off) 59' |
| TP | 3 | Kalolo Tuiloma | (substituted off) 46' |
| HK | 2 | Ray Niuia | (substituted off) 68' |
| LP | 1 | Albert Anae | (substituted off) 57' |
Replacements:
| HK | 16 | JP Sauni | (substituted on) 68' |
| PR | 17 | Jonah Aoina | (substituted on) 57' |
| PR | 18 | Michael Alaalatoa | (substituted on) 46' |
| LK | 19 | Filo Paulo | (substituted on) 59' |
| LK | 20 | Theo McFarland | (substituted on) 59' |
| SH | 21 | Auvasa Faleali'i | (substituted on) 59' |
| CE | 22 | Stacey Ili | (substituted on) 50' |
| WG | 23 | Elisapeta Alofipo | (substituted on) 68' |
Coach:
(Samoa) Seilala Mapusua

Assistant referees:
Graham Cooper (Australia)
Reuben Keane (Australia)
Television match official:
Mike Fraser (New Zealand)

Notes:

- The sides faced each other for the first time since 2008.

26 June 2021
15:00 BST (UTC+01)

| British & Irish Lions | 28–10 | Japan |
| Try: Adams 12' c Van der Merwe 18' c Henshaw 23' c Beirne 48' c Con: Biggar (4/4) 13', 19', 24', 49' | Report | Try: Himeno 59' c Con: Tamura (1/1) 60'; Pen: Tamura (1/2) 69' |

Murrayfield Stadium, Edinburgh
Attendance: 16,500
Referee: Pascal Gaüzère (France)

Team details

| FB | 15 | (Wales) Liam Williams | (substituted off) 65' |
| RW | 14 | (Wales) Josh Adams |
| OC | 13 | (Ireland) Robbie Henshaw |
| IC | 12 | (Ireland) Bundee Aki | (substituted off) 50' |
| LW | 11 | (Scotland) Duhan van der Merwe |
| FH | 10 | (Wales) Dan Biggar |
| SH | 9 | (Ireland) Conor Murray | (substituted off) 60' |
| N8 | 8 | (Ireland) Jack Conan | (substituted off) 70' |
| OF | 7 | (Wales) Justin Tipuric | (substituted off) 22' |
| BF | 6 | (Ireland) Tadhg Beirne |
| RL | 5 | (Wales) Alun Wyn Jones (c) | (substituted off) 8' |
| LL | 4 | (Ireland) Iain Henderson |
| TP | 3 | (Ireland) Tadhg Furlong | (substituted off) 52' |
| HK | 2 | (Wales) Ken Owens | (substituted off) 69' |
| LP | 1 | (Scotland) Rory Sutherland | (substituted off) 52' |
Replacements:
| HK | 16 | (England) Jamie George | (substituted on) 69' |
| PR | 17 | (Wales) Wyn Jones | (substituted on) 52' |
| PR | 18 | (England) Kyle Sinckler | (substituted on) 52' |
| LK | 19 | (England) Courtney Lawes | (substituted on) 8' |
| N8 | 20 | (Wales) Taulupe Faletau | (substituted on) 22' |
| SH | 21 | (Scotland) Ali Price | (substituted on) 60' |
| FH | 22 | (England) Owen Farrell | (substituted on) 50' |
| WG | 23 | (England) Anthony Watson | (substituted on) 65' |
Coach:
(New Zealand) Warren Gatland

| FB | 15 | Ryohei Yamanaka |
| RW | 14 | Kotaro Matsushima |
| OC | 13 | Timothy Lafaele |
| IC | 12 | Ryoto Nakamura |
| LW | 11 | Siosaia Fifita |
| FH | 10 | Yu Tamura |
| SH | 9 | Kaito Shigeno | (substituted off) 65' |
| N8 | 8 | Amanaki Mafi | (substituted off) 67' |
| OF | 7 | Lappies Labuschagné | (substituted off) 49' |
| BF | 6 | Michael Leitch (c) |
| RL | 5 | James Moore |
| LL | 4 | Wimpie van der Walt | (substituted off) 61' |
| TP | 3 | Koo Ji-won | (substituted off) 55' |
| HK | 2 | Atsushi Sakate |
| LP | 1 | Keita Inagaki | (substituted off) 60' |
Replacements:
| HK | 16 | Kosuke Horikoshi |
| PR | 17 | Craig Millar | (substituted on) 60' |
| PR | 18 | Asaeli Ai Valu | (substituted on) 55' |
| FL | 19 | Jack Cornelsen | (substituted on) 61' |
| FL | 20 | Kazuki Himeno | (substituted on) 49' |
| N8 | 21 | Tevita Tatafu | (substituted on) 67' |
| SH | 22 | Naoto Saito | (substituted on) 65' |
| FH | 23 | Rikiya Matsuda |
Coach:
(New Zealand) Jamie Joseph

Performance of the Match:
(Wales) Dan Biggar (British & Irish Lions)

Assistant referees:
Pierre Brousset (France)
Ludovic Cayre (France)
Television match official:
Eric Gauzins (France)

Notes:

- Hamish Watson and Zander Fagerson (British & Irish Lions) were named to start, but was withdrawn in the week leading up to the game due to injury and head knock. Justin Tipuric replaced Watson whilst Tadhg Furlong was promoted from the bench to replace Fagerson - Kyle Sinckler replaced Furlong on the bench.
- No replacement was made for Jack Conan.
- Jack Cornelsen, Siosaia Fifita, Craig Millar and Naoto Saito (all Japan) made their international debuts.
- Japan became the eighth test nation to play the British & Irish Lions.

27 June 2021
14:00 BST (UTC+01)

| England A | Cancelled (Note: Match was called off after three Scottish players tested positive for COVID-19) | Scotland A |

Welford Road Stadium, Leicester
Referee: Frank Murphy (Ireland)

Team details (named before cancellation)

| FB | 15 | Freddie Steward |
| RW | 14 | Adam Radwan |
| OC | 13 | Ollie Lawrence |
| IC | 12 | Dan Kelly |
| LW | 11 | Max Malins |
| FH | 10 | Jacob Umaga |
| SH | 9 | Harry Randall |
| N8 | 8 | Callum Chick |
| OF | 7 | Ben Curry |
| BF | 6 | Lewis Ludlow (c) |
| RL | 5 | Charlie Ewels |
| LL | 4 | Harry Wells |
| TP | 3 | Joe Heyes |
| HK | 2 | Curtis Langdon |
| LP | 1 | Ellis Genge |
Replacements:
| HK | 16 | Jamie Blamire |
| PR | 17 | Beno Obano |
| PR | 18 | Trevor Davison |
| FL | 19 | Ted Hill |
| FL | 20 | Lewis Ludlam |
| SH | 21 | Dan Robson |
| FH | 22 | George Furbank |
| WG | 23 | Joe Cokanasiga |
Coach:
(New Zealand) John Mitchell

| FB | 15 | Damien Hoyland |
| RW | 14 | Rufus McLean |
| OC | 13 | Matt Scott (c) |
| IC | 12 | Stafford McDowall |
| LW | 11 | Blair Kinghorn |
| FH | 10 | Ross Thompson |
| SH | 9 | Charlie Shiel |
| N8 | 8 | Magnus Bradbury |
| OF | 7 | Rory Darge |
| BF | 6 | Josh Bayliss |
| RL | 5 | Kiran McDonald |
| LL | 4 | Cameron Henderson |
| TP | 3 | Oli Kebble |
| HK | 2 | Ewan Ashman |
| LP | 1 | Nick Auterac |
Replacements:
| HK | 16 | Adam McBurney |
| PR | 17 | Robin Hislop |
| PR | 18 | Javan Sebastian |
| LK | 19 | Jamie Hodgson |
| FL | 20 | Callum Hunter-Hill |
| SH | 21 | Ben Vellacott |
| FH | 22 | Adam Hastings |
| CE | 23 | George Taylor |
Coach:
(Scotland) Mike Blair

Assistant referees:
Eoghan Cross (Ireland)
Peter Martin (Ireland)
Television match official:
Olly Hodges (Ireland)

=== 2/3/4 July ===
2 July 2021
19:00 SAST (UTC+02)

| South Africa | 40–9 | Georgia |
| Try: Fassi 4' m Mbonambi 35' c Reinach 37' c Smith 54' c H. Jantjies 58' c Marx 68' c Con: Pollard (4/5) 36', 38', 54', 58'; E. Jantjies (1/1) 69' | Report | Pen: Abzhandadze (3/3) 3', 18', 25' |

Loftus Versfeld Stadium, Pretoria
Attendance: 0
Referee: Mike Adamson (Scotland)

Team details

| FB | 15 | Willie le Roux |
| RW | 14 | Rosko Specman |
| OC | 13 | Jesse Kriel |
| IC | 12 | François Steyn | (substituted off) 55' |
| LW | 11 | Aphelele Fassi |
| FH | 10 | Handré Pollard | (substituted off) 63' |
| SH | 9 | Cobus Reinach | (substituted off) 55' |
| N8 | 8 | Kwagga Smith | (substituted off) 60' |
| BF | 7 | Pieter-Steph du Toit |
| OF | 6 | Siya Kolisi (c) |
| RL | 5 | Franco Mostert |
| LL | 4 | Eben Etzebeth | (substituted off) 40' |
| TP | 3 | Trevor Nyakane | (substituted off) 28' | (substituted on) 38' | (substituted off) 49' |
| HK | 2 | Bongi Mbonambi | (substituted off) 49' |
| LP | 1 | Ox Nché | (substituted off) 49' |
Replacements:
| HK | 16 | Malcolm Marx | (substituted on) 49' |
| PR | 17 | Steven Kitshoff | (substituted on) 49' |
| PR | 18 | Frans Malherbe | (substituted on) 28' | (substituted off) 38' | (substituted on) 49' |
| LK | 19 | Marvin Orie | (substituted on) 40' |
| LF | 20 | Jasper Wiese | (substituted on) 60' |
| SH | 21 | Herschel Jantjies | (substituted on) 55' |
| FH | 22 | Elton Jantjies | (substituted on) 63' |
| FB | 23 | Damian Willemse | (substituted on) 55' |
Coach:
(South Africa) Jacques Nienaber

| FB | 15 | Davit Niniashvili |
| RW | 14 | Aka Tabutsadze |
| OC | 13 | Giorgi Kveseladze |
| IC | 12 | Merab Sharikadze (c) | | | (substituted off) 79' |
| LW | 11 | Demur Tapladze |
| FH | 10 | Tedo Abzhandadze | | (substituted off) 70' | (substituted on) 79' |
| SH | 9 | Vasil Lobzhanidze | | (substituted off) 60' |
| N8 | 8 | Tornike Jalaghonia |
| OF | 7 | Beka Saghinadze | (yellow card) 34' to 44' | (substituted off) 44' |
| BF | 6 | Ilia Spanderashvili | | (substituted off) 49' |
| RL | 5 | Konstantin Mikautadze | | (substituted off) 49' |
| LL | 4 | Davit Gigauri | | (substituted off) 60' |
| TP | 3 | Giorgi Melikidze | | (substituted off) 49' |
| HK | 2 | Jaba Bregvadze |
| LP | 1 | Guram Gogichashvili | | (substituted off) 60' |
Replacements:
| HK | 16 | Giorgi Chkoidze | | (substituted on) 44' |
| PR | 17 | Nika Khatiashvili | | (substituted on) 60' |
| PR | 18 | Luka Japaridze | | (substituted on) 49' |
| LK | 19 | Nodar Tcheishvili | | (substituted on) 49' |
| LK | 20 | Giorgi Javakhia | | (substituted on) 60' |
| SH | 21 | Gela Aprasidze | | (substituted on) 60' |
| FH | 22 | Giorgi Babunashvili | | (substituted on) 70' |
| FL | 23 | Irakli Tskhadadze | | (substituted on) 49' |
Coach:
(Georgia (country)) Levan Maisashvili

Assistant referees:
Wayne Barnes (England)
Marius van der Westhuizen (South Africa)
Television match official:
Marius Jonker (South Africa)

Notes:

- Giorgi Tsutskiridze (Georgia) was named to start but was injured in training ahead of the game and was replaced by Ilia Spanderashvili. Irakli Tskhadadze replaced Spanderashvili on the bench.
- Aphelele Fassi, Rosko Specman and Jasper Wiese (all South Africa) and Luka Japaridze (Georgia) made their international debuts.

3 July 2021
16:30 NZST (UTC+12)

| Māori All Blacks | 38–21 | Samoa |
| Try: Dixon 22' c Lowe (2) 34' m, 58' m Penalty try (2) 40', 63'; Wainui 46' m Con: Black (1/2) 23'; Ioane (1/2) 47' | Report | Try: Foma'i 24' c Alosio 41' c Tuiloma 80' c Con: Iona (2/2) 25', 42'; Taefu (1/1) 80' |

Mount Smart Stadium, Auckland
Attendance: 10,000
Referee: Mike Fraser (New Zealand)

Team details

| FB | 15 | Josh Ioane |
| RW | 14 | Jonah Lowe |
| OC | 13 | Billy Proctor | 64' to 66' |
| IC | 12 | Alex Nankivell | | (substituted off) 66' |
| LW | 11 | Sean Wainui |
| FH | 10 | Otere Black | (substituted off) 46' |
| SH | 9 | Sam Nock | (substituted off) 40' |
| N8 | 8 | Whetu Douglas |
| OF | 7 | Billy Harmon | (substituted off) 36' |
| BF | 6 | Reed Prinsep |
| RL | 5 | Pari Pari Parkinson | (substituted off) 40' |
| LL | 4 | Manaaki Selby-Rickit |
| TP | 3 | Josh Hohneck | (substituted off) 60' |
| HK | 2 | Ash Dixon (c) | (substituted off) 53' |
| LP | 1 | Tamaiti Williams | (substituted off) 45' |
Replacements:
| HK | 16 | Kurt Eklund | (substituted on) 53' |
| PR | 17 | Ollie Norris | (substituted on) 45' |
| PR | 18 | Marcel Renata | (substituted on) 60' |
| LK | 19 | Isaia Walker-Leawere | (substituted on) 40' |
| FL | 20 | Josh Dickson | (substituted on) 36' |
| SH | 21 | Bryn Hall | (substituted on) 40' |
| CE | 22 | Rameka Poihipi | (substituted on) 64' |
| WG | 23 | Shaun Stevenson | (substituted on) 46' |
Coach:
(New Zealand) Clayton McMillan

| FB | 15 | Tomasi Alosio |
| RW | 14 | Elisapeta Alofipo | | (substituted off) 66' |
| OC | 13 | Stacey Ili |
| IC | 12 | Henry Taefu |
| LW | 11 | Neria Foma'i |
| FH | 10 | Rodney Iona | | (substituted off) 51' |
| SH | 9 | Auvasa Faleali'i | | (substituted off) 49' |
| N8 | 8 | Henry Stowers |
| OF | 7 | Alamanda Motuga |
| BF | 6 | Samuel Slade | (yellow card) 40' to 50' |
| RL | 5 | Theo McFarland | | (substituted off) 55' |
| LL | 4 | Ben Nee-Nee | | (substituted off) 60' |
| TP | 3 | Michael Alaalatoa (c) | | (substituted off) 62' |
| HK | 2 | Ray Niuia | | (substituted off) 62' |
| LP | 1 | Tietie Tuimauga | | (substituted off) 62' |
Replacements:
| HK | 16 | JP Sauni | | (substituted on) 62' |
| PR | 17 | Jonah Aoina | | (substituted on) 62' |
| PR | 18 | Kalolo Tuiloma | | (substituted on) 62' |
| LK | 19 | Filo Paulo | | (substituted on) 60' |
| FL | 20 | Genesis Mamea-Lemalu | (yellow card) 63' to 73' | (substituted on) 55' |
| SH | 21 | Jonathan Taumateine | | (substituted on) 49' |
| FH | 22 | D'Angelo Leuila | | (substituted on) 51' |
| WG | 23 | Joe Perez | | (substituted on) 66' |
Coach:
(Samoa) Seilala Mapusua

Assistant referees:
Paul Williams (New Zealand)
Brendon Pickerill (New Zealand)
Television match official:
Shane McDermott (New Zealand)

Notes:

- Albert Anae and Ahsee Tuala (Samoa) were named to start but withdrew ahead of kick off due to injury and were replaced by Tomasi Alosio and Tietie Tuimauga. Jonah Aoina replaced Tuimauga on the bench.
- This was the Māori All Blacks' 125th international match.

3 July 2021
19:05 NZST (UTC+12)

| New Zealand | 102–0 | Tonga |
| Try: McKenzie 2' m Papalii (2) 5' c, 37' m Weber (3) 7' c, 16' c, 50' c Jordan (5) 9' m, 20' c, 47' m, 55' c, 68' m Jacobson 42' c Mo'unga 54' c R. Ioane 61' c Tuipulotu 77' c Bridge 80' c Con: Mo'unga (7/11) 6', 8', 17', 20', 43', 51', 54'; B. Barrett (4/5) 56', 62', 77', 80' | Report |

Mount Smart Stadium, Auckland
Attendance: 15,024
Referee: Ben O'Keeffe (New Zealand) (Note: Replaces Damon Murphy after travel restrictions meant Murphy was unable to travel to New Zealand.)

Team details

| FB | 15 | Damian McKenzie |
| RW | 14 | Will Jordan |
| OC | 13 | Rieko Ioane |
| IC | 12 | Quinn Tupaea | (substituted off) 63' |
| LW | 11 | George Bridge |
| FH | 10 | Richie Mo'unga | (substituted off) 55' |
| SH | 9 | Brad Weber | (substituted off) 55' |
| N8 | 8 | Luke Jacobson |
| OF | 7 | Dalton Papalii | (substituted off) 53' |
| BF | 6 | Akira Ioane |
| RL | 5 | Sam Whitelock (c) |
| LL | 4 | Scott Barrett | (substituted off) 63' |
| TP | 3 | Angus Ta'avao | (substituted off) 47' |
| HK | 2 | Dane Coles | (substituted off) 47' |
| LP | 1 | Karl Tu'inukuafe | (substituted off) 47' |
Replacements:
| HK | 16 | Asafo Aumua | (substituted on) 47' |
| PR | 17 | George Bower | (substituted on) 47' |
| PR | 18 | Tyrel Lomax | (substituted on) 47' |
| LK | 19 | Patrick Tuipulotu | (substituted on) 63' |
| FL | 20 | Ethan Blackadder | (substituted on) 53' |
| SH | 21 | Finlay Christie | (substituted on) 55' |
| FH | 22 | Beauden Barrett | (substituted on) 55' |
| FB | 23 | Jordie Barrett | (substituted on) 63' |
Coach:
(New Zealand) Ian Foster

| FB | 15 | James Faiva | (substituted off) 49' |
| RW | 14 | Hosea Saumaki | (substituted off) 55' |
| OC | 13 | Fine Inisi | (substituted off) 58' |
| IC | 12 | Nikolai Foliaki |
| LW | 11 | Penikolo Latu |
| FH | 10 | Kali Hala |
| SH | 9 | Sonatane Takulua (c) |
| N8 | 8 | Sione Tuipulotu |
| OF | 7 | Solomone Funaki |
| BF | 6 | Mateaki Kafatolu | (substituted off) 49' |
| RL | 5 | Zane Kapeli | (substituted off) 70' |
| LL | 4 | Don Lolo |
| TP | 3 | Sila Puafisi | (substituted off) 75' |
| HK | 2 | Sam Moli | (substituted off) 70' |
| LP | 1 | Duke Nginingini | (substituted off) 49' |
Replacements:
| HK | 16 | Siua Maile | (substituted on) 70' |
| PR | 17 | Jethro Felemi | (substituted on) 49' |
| PR | 18 | Lua Li | (substituted on) 75' |
| LK | 19 | Harrison Mataele | (substituted on) 70' |
| FL | 20 | Viliami Taulani | (substituted on) 49' |
| N8 | 21 | Nasi Manu | (substituted on) 58' |
| SH | 22 | Leon Fukofuka | (substituted on) 55' |
| WG | 23 | Walter Fifita | (substituted on) 49' |
Coach:
(Australia) Toutai Kefu

Assistant referees:
Paul Williams (New Zealand)
Brendon Pickerill (New Zealand)
Television match official:
Glenn Newman (New Zealand)

Notes:

- Tau Kolomatangi (Tonga) was named as a replacement, but was replaced by Lua Li in the week leading up to the match after eligibility concerns over Kolomatangi arose surrounding a previous appearance for Hong Kong in 2019 possibly capturing the player to Hong Kong.
- Ethan Blackadder, George Bower, Finlay Christie and Quinn Tupaea (all New Zealand) and Walter Fifita, Nikolai Foliaki, Solomone Funaki, Fine Inisi, Mateaki Kafatolu, Lua Li, Don Lolo, Harrison Mataele, Sam Moli, Duke Nginingini, Hosea Saumaki, Viliami Taulani, Sione Tuipulotu (all Tonga) made their international debuts.
- New Zealand equalled their highest winning margin over Tonga of 102 points, set in June 2000.
- New Zealand scored more than 100 points in a game for the sixth time.

3 July 2021
13:00 IST (UTC+01)

| Ireland | 39–31 | Japan |
| Try: Farrell 8' c McCloskey 26' m Bealham 40' c Van der Flier 49' c Stockdale 52' c Con: Carbery (4/5) 9', 40', 50', 53'; Pen: Carbery (2/2) 62', 69' | Report | Try: Leitch 11' c Lafaele 36' c Fifita 43' c Saito 57' c Con: Tamura (4/4) 12', 37', 45', 58'; Pen: Tamura (1/1) 4' |

Aviva Stadium, Dublin
Attendance: 3,000
Referee: Karl Dickson (England)

Team details

| FB | 15 | Hugo Keenan |
| RW | 14 | Jordan Larmour | (substituted off) 31' |
| OC | 13 | Chris Farrell | (substituted off) 43' |
| IC | 12 | Stuart McCloskey |
| LW | 11 | Jacob Stockdale |
| FH | 10 | Joey Carbery |
| SH | 9 | Jamison Gibson-Park | (substituted off) 76' |
| N8 | 8 | Caelan Doris |
| OF | 7 | Josh van der Flier |
| BF | 6 | Peter O'Mahony | (substituted off) 71' |
| RL | 5 | James Ryan (c) |
| LL | 4 | Ultan Dillane | (substituted off) 60' |
| TP | 3 | Finlay Bealham | (substituted off) 59' |
| HK | 2 | Ronan Kelleher | (substituted off) 71' |
| LP | 1 | Dave Kilcoyne | (substituted off) 59' |
Replacements:
| HK | 16 | Rob Herring | (substituted on) 71' |
| PR | 17 | Ed Byrne | (substituted on) 59' |
| PR | 18 | John Ryan | (substituted on) 59' |
| LK | 19 | Ryan Baird | (substituted on) 60' |
| FL | 20 | Gavin Coombes | (substituted on) 71' |
| SH | 21 | Craig Casey | (substituted on) 76' |
| FH | 22 | Billy Burns | (substituted on) 43' |
| CE | 23 | Shane Daly | (substituted on) 31' |
Coach:
(England) Andy Farrell

| FB | 15 | Kotaro Matsushima | (substituted off) 51' |
| RW | 14 | Semisi Masirewa |
| OC | 13 | Timothy Lafaele |
| IC | 12 | Ryoto Nakamura |
| LW | 11 | Siosaia Fifita |
| FH | 10 | Yu Tamura | (substituted off) 67' |
| SH | 9 | Naoto Saito | (substituted off) 67' |
| N8 | 8 | Tevita Tatafu | (substituted off) 54' |
| OF | 7 | Lappies Labuschagné |
| BF | 6 | Michael Leitch (c) |
| RL | 5 | James Moore |
| LL | 4 | Wimpie van der Walt | (substituted off) 51' |
| TP | 3 | Koo Ji-won | (substituted off) 51' |
| HK | 2 | Atsushi Sakate | (substituted off) 62' |
| LP | 1 | Keita Inagaki | (substituted off) 51' |
Replacements:
| HK | 16 | Kosuke Horikoshi | (substituted on) 62' |
| PR | 17 | Craig Millar | (substituted on) 51' |
| PR | 18 | Asaeli Ai Valu | (substituted on) 51' |
| FL | 19 | Jack Cornelsen | (substituted on) 51' |
| N8 | 20 | Amanaki Mafi | (substituted on) 54' |
| SH | 21 | Kaito Shigeno | (substituted on) 67' |
| FH | 22 | Rikiya Matsuda | (substituted on) 67' |
| CE | 23 | Shane Gates | (substituted on) 51' |
Coach:
(New Zealand) Jamie Joseph

Player of the Match:
Josh van der Flier (Ireland)

Assistant referees:
Luke Pearce (England)
Andrea Piardi (Italy)
Television match official:
Claire Hodnett (England)

Notes:

- Kazuki Himeno (Japan) was named to start but withdrew ahead of game day and was replaced by Tevita Tatafu. Amanaki Mafi replaced Tatafu on the bench.
- Gavin Coombes (Ireland) and Shane Gates and Semisi Masirewa (both Japan) made their international debuts.

3 July 2021
15:00 BST (UTC+01)

| Wales | 68–12 | Canada |
| Try: Williams (2) 6' c, 45' c Botham 14' m Holmes (2) 20' c, 80+1' c Smith 27' c Dee 31' c Rowlands 36' c Basham (2) 56' c, 61' c Con: Sheedy (7/8) 7', 21', 28', 32', 37', 46', 57'; B. Thomas (2/2) 62', 80+3' | Report | Try: Lloyd 4' m Coats 68' c Con: Nelson (1/2) 68' |

Millennium Stadium, Cardiff
Attendance: 8,200
Referee: Nika Amashukeli (Georgia)

Team details

| FB | 15 | Leigh Halfpenny | (substituted off) 2' |
| RW | 14 | Jonah Holmes |
| OC | 13 | Willis Halaholo |
| IC | 12 | Jonathan Davies (c) |
| LW | 11 | Tom Rogers |
| FH | 10 | Callum Sheedy | (substituted off) 58' |
| SH | 9 | Tomos Williams | (substituted off) 53' |
| N8 | 8 | Aaron Wainwright |
| OF | 7 | James Botham | (substituted off) 51' |
| BF | 6 | Ross Moriarty |
| RL | 5 | Will Rowlands | (substituted off) 47' |
| LL | 4 | Ben Carter |
| TP | 3 | Dillon Lewis | (substituted off) 47' |
| HK | 2 | Elliot Dee | (substituted off) 47' |
| LP | 1 | Nicky Smith | (substituted off) 47' |
Replacements:
| HK | 16 | Ryan Elias | (substituted on) 47' |
| PR | 17 | Gareth Thomas | (substituted on) 47' |
| PR | 18 | Leon Brown | (substituted on) 47' |
| FL | 19 | Josh Turnbull | (substituted on) 47' |
| FL | 20 | Taine Basham | (substituted on) 51' |
| SH | 21 | Kieran Hardy | (substituted on) 53' |
| CE | 22 | Ben Thomas | (substituted on) 58' |
| CE | 23 | Nick Tompkins | (substituted on) 2' |
Coach:
(New Zealand) Wayne Pivac

| FB | 15 | Cooper Coats | (substituted off) 75' |
| RW | 14 | Cole Davis |
| OC | 13 | Ben LeSage |
| IC | 12 | Quinn Ngawati |
| LW | 11 | Kainoa Lloyd |
| FH | 10 | Peter Nelson |
| SH | 9 | Ross Braude | (substituted off) 56' |
| N8 | 8 | Siaki Vikilani | (substituted off) 56' |
| OF | 7 | Lucas Rumball (c) | (substituted off) 58' | (substituted on) 68' |
| BF | 6 | Reegan O'Gorman | (substituted off) 40' |
| RL | 5 | Josh Larsen |
| LL | 4 | Conor Keys | | (substituted off) 68' |
| TP | 3 | Jake Ilnicki | (substituted off) 40' | (substituted on) 58' |
| HK | 2 | Andrew Quattrin | (substituted off) 47' |
| LP | 1 | Djustice Sears-Duru | (substituted off) 40' |
Replacements:
| HK | 16 | Eric Howard | (substituted on) 47' |
| PR | 17 | Cole Keith | (substituted on) 40' |
| PR | 18 | Tyler Rowland | (substituted on) 40' | (substituted off) 58' |
| FL | 19 | Don Carson | (substituted on) 56' |
| FL | 20 | Michael Smith | (substituted on) 40' |
| LK | 21 | Lucas Albornoz | (substituted on) 58' |
| SH | 22 | William Percillier | (substituted on) 56' |
| FH | 23 | Robbie Povey | (substituted on) 75' |
Coach:
(Wales) Kingsley Jones

Player of the Match:
Ben Carter (Wales)

Assistant referees:
Christophe Ridley (England)
Tom Foley (England)
Television match official:
Stuart Terheege (England)

Notes:

- Leigh Halfpenny (Wales) earned his 100th international cap (96 for Wales, 4 for the British & Irish Lions).
- Taine Basham, Ben Carter, Tom Rogers, Ben Thomas and Gareth Thomas (all Wales) and Ross Braude, Don Carson, Cooper Coats, Quinn Ngawati, Tyler Rowland, Michael Smith, Siaki Vikilani (all Canada) made their international debuts.

3 July 2021

| Portugal | Cancelled (Note: Cancelled following COVID-19 restrictions and rates in Portugal.) | Zimbabwe |

Lisbon

3 July 2021
21:00 EEST (UTC+03)

| Romania | 17–24 | Argentina |
| Try: Căpățână 45' m Pen: Melinte (4/5) 5', 22', 32', 62' | Report (In Romania) | Try: Bruni 14' m Cordero 24' m Penalty try 36'; González 73' c Con: Miotti (1/1) 74' |

Stadionul Arcul de Triumf, Bucharest
Attendance: 4,000
Referee: Mathieu Raynal (France) (Note: Mathieu Raynal replaces Pascal Gaüzère following the announced that Gaüzère was to retire after the Lions v Japan game.)

Team details

| FB | 15 | Ionel Melinte |
| RW | 14 | Ionuț Dumitru | | (substituted off) 55' |
| OC | 13 | Taylor Gontineac |
| IC | 12 | Alexandru Bucur |
| LW | 11 | Nicolas Onuțu |
| FH | 10 | Daniel Plai |
| SH | 9 | Gabriel Rupanu | | (substituted off) 45' |
| N8 | 8 | André Gorin (c) |
| OF | 7 | Cristi Boboc | | (substituted off) 40' |
| BF | 6 | Cristi Chirică | (yellow card) 36' to 46' | (substituted off) 61' |
| RL | 5 | Adrian Moțoc |
| LL | 4 | Florian Roșu | | (substituted off) 40' |
| TP | 3 | Alexandru Țăruș | | (substituted off) 55' |
| HK | 2 | Eugen Căpățână | | (substituted off) 50' |
| LP | 1 | Alexandru Savin | | (substituted off) 40' |
Replacements:
| HK | 16 | Florin Bărdașu | | (substituted on) 50' |
| PR | 17 | Ionel Badiu | | (substituted on) 40' |
| PR | 18 | Vasile Bălan | | (substituted on) 55' |
| LK | 19 | Marius Antonescu | | (substituted on) 40' |
| FL | 20 | Mihai Macovei | | (substituted on) 40' |
| FL | 21 | Vlad Neculau | | (substituted on) 61' |
| SH | 22 | Florin Surugiu | | (substituted on) 45' |
| WG | 23 | Robert Neagu | | (substituted on) 55' |
Coach:
(England) Andy Robinson

| FB | 15 | Santiago Cordero |
| RW | 14 | Bautista Delguy |
| OC | 13 | Matías Moroni |
| IC | 12 | Jerónimo de la Fuente |
| LW | 11 | Juan Imhoff | | (substituted off) 48' |
| FH | 10 | Nicolás Sánchez | | (substituted off) 59' |
| SH | 9 | Tomás Cubelli | | (substituted off) 75' |
| N8 | 8 | Rodrigo Bruni | | (substituted off) 69' |
| OF | 7 | Francisco Gorrissen |
| BF | 6 | Pablo Matera |
| RL | 5 | Tomás Lavanini | | (substituted off) 45' |
| LL | 4 | Marcos Kremer |
| TP | 3 | Enrique Pieretto | | (substituted off) 52' |
| HK | 2 | Julián Montoya (c) | | (substituted off) 61' |
| LP | 1 | Facundo Gigena | | (substituted off) 52' |
Replacements:
| HK | 16 | Facundo Bosch | | (substituted on) 61' |
| PR | 17 | Nahuel Tetaz Chaparro | | (substituted on) 52' |
| PR | 18 | Santiago Medrano | | (substituted on) 52' |
| N8 | 19 | Facundo Isa | | (substituted on) 45' |
| FL | 20 | Juan Martín González | | (substituted on) 69' |
| SH | 21 | Gonzalo Bertranou | (yellow card) 78' to 80' | (substituted on) 75' |
| FH | 22 | Domingo Miotti | | (substituted on) 59' |
| CE | 23 | Juan Cruz Mallía | | (substituted on) 48' |
Coach:
(Argentina) Mario Ledesma

Assistant referees:
Pierre Brousset (France)
Craig Evans (Wales)
Television match official:
Eric Gauzins (France)

Notes:

- Emiliano Boffelli (Argentina) had been named to start but withdrew in the week leading up to the game; Santiago Cordero moved from the wing to fullback with Bautista Delguy joining the starting XV on the wing. Juan Cruz Mallía replaced Delguy on the bench.
- Florian Roșu (Romania) and Juan Martín González (Argentina) made their international debuts.
- Argentina retained the Latin Cup.

4 July 2021
14:00 BST (UTC+01)

| England | 43–29 | United States |
| Try: Underhill 6' m Lawrence 14' c Cokanasiga (2) 23' c, 30' c Blamire 49' m Smith 65' m Randall 69' c Con: Smith (5/7) 15', 24', 32', 70' | Report | Try: Faʻanana-Schultz 41' m Dolan 57' c Germishuys 73' c Dyer 77' c Con: Carty (3/4) 58', 74', 78'; Pen: Carty (1/1) 5' |

Twickenham Stadium, London
Attendance: 10,000
Referee: Andrew Brace (Ireland)

Team details

| FB | 15 | Freddie Steward |
| RW | 14 | Joe Cokanasiga |
| OC | 13 | Henry Slade |
| IC | 12 | Ollie Lawrence | (substituted off) 34' |
| LW | 11 | Max Malins | (substituted off) 6' |
| FH | 10 | Marcus Smith |
| SH | 9 | Harry Randall |
| N8 | 8 | Callum Chick | (substituted off) 53' |
| OF | 7 | Sam Underhill |
| BF | 6 | Lewis Ludlow (c) | (substituted off) 53' |
| RL | 5 | Charlie Ewels |
| LL | 4 | Josh McNally | (substituted off) 47' |
| TP | 3 | Joe Heyes | (substituted off) 53' |
| HK | 2 | Curtis Langdon | (substituted off) 47' |
| LP | 1 | Ellis Genge | (substituted off) 58' |
Replacements:
| HK | 16 | Jamie Blamire | (substituted on) 47' |
| PR | 17 | Beno Obano | (substituted on) 58' |
| PR | 18 | Trevor Davison | (substituted on) 55' |
| FL | 19 | Ted Hill | (substituted on) 47' |
| FL | 20 | Ben Curry | (substituted on) 55' |
| FL | 21 | Lewis Ludlam | (substituted on) 55' |
| SH | 22 | Dan Robson | (substituted on) 34' |
| FH | 23 | Jacob Umaga | (substituted on) 6' |
Coach:
(Australia) Eddie Jones

| FB | 15 | Marcel Brache | (substituted off) 34' |
| RW | 14 | Mike Te'o |
| OC | 13 | Bryce Campbell (c) |
| IC | 12 | Calvin Whiting |
| LW | 11 | Mika Kruse |
| FH | 10 | Luke Carty |
| SH | 9 | Ruben de Haas | (substituted off) 69' |
| N8 | 8 | Cam Dolan | (substituted off) 67' |
| OF | 7 | Riekert Hattingh |
| BF | 6 | Jamason Faʻanana-Schultz | (substituted off) 51' |
| RL | 5 | Nick Civetta | (substituted off) 51' |
| LL | 4 | Greg Peterson |
| TP | 3 | Paul Mullen | (substituted off) 47' |
| HK | 2 | Mike Sosene-Feagai | (substituted off) 47' |
| LP | 1 | David Ainu'u | (substituted off) 74' |
Replacements:
| HK | 16 | Joe Taufete'e | (substituted on) 47' |
| PR | 17 | Matt Harmon | (substituted on) 74' |
| PR | 18 | Dino Waldren | (substituted on) 47' |
| LK | 19 | Nate Brakeley | (substituted on) 51' |
| FL | 20 | Psalm Wooching | (substituted on) 51' |
| FL | 21 | Hanco Germishuys | (substituted on) 67' |
| SH | 22 | Michael Baska | (substituted on) 69' |
| WG | 23 | Christian Dyer | (substituted on) 34' |
Coach:
(South Africa) Gary Gold

Player of the Match:
Harry Randall (England)

Assistant referees:
Andrea Piardi (Italy)
Ben Blain (Scotland)
Television match official:
Ben Whitehouse (Wales)

Notes:

- Will Hooley (United States) had been named to start but withdrew ahead of the game due to injury; Marcel Brache moved from centre to fullback to replace him and Calvin Whiting moved from the bench to centre. Christian Dyer replaced Whiting on the bench.
- Lewis Ludlow became the fifth player to captain England on debut and the first man since Nigel Melville in 1984.
- Jamie Blamire, Callum Chick, Ben Curry, Trevor Davison, Joe Heyes, Curtis Langdon, Lewis Ludlow, Josh McNally, Harry Randall, Marcus Smith, Freddie Steward and Jacob Umaga (all England) and Michael Baska, Luke Carty, Christian Dyer, Matt Harmon, Riekert Hattingh and Mika Kruse (all United States) made their international debuts.
- The United States made their highest score against England, surpassing the previous highest of 19 scored in 2001.

4 July 2021
14:10 UYT (UTC-03)

| Uruguay | 42–26 | Argentina XV |
| Try: Vilaseca 11' c Kessler 32' c Dotti 40' c Viñals 48' c Echeverry 61' c Gattas 80' c Con: Berchesi (5/5) 12', 33', 40', 49', 62'; Echeverry (1/1) 80' | Report | Try: Elías 19' c Fernández Criado 24' c Daireaux 59' m Simes 74' c Con: Elías (2/2) 19', 25'; Prisciantelli (1/2) 74' |

Estadio Charrúa, Montevideo
Attendance: 0
Referee: Nehuén Jauri Rivero (Argentina)

Team details

| FB | 15 | Rodrigo Silva |
| RW | 14 | Manuel Viñals | | (substituted off) 61' |
| OC | 13 | Felipe Arcos Pérez | | (substituted off) 70' |
| IC | 12 | Andrés Vilaseca (c) |
| LW | 11 | Gastón Mieres | | (substituted off) 40' |
| FH | 10 | Felipe Berchesi | | (substituted off) 59' |
| SH | 9 | Tomás Inciarte |
| N8 | 8 | Manuel Diana | | (substituted off) 56' |
| BF | 7 | Santiago Civetta |
| OF | 6 | Franco Lamanna | | (substituted off) 56' |
| RL | 5 | Ignacio Dotti | | (substituted off) 52' |
| LL | 4 | Felipe Aliaga | | (substituted off) 29' |
| TP | 3 | Diego Arbelo | | (substituted off) 59' |
| HK | 2 | Germán Kessler | | (substituted off) 60' |
| LP | 1 | Mateo Sanguinetti | | (substituted off) 55' |
Replacements:
| HK | 16 | Facundo Gattas | | (substituted on) 40' |
| PR | 17 | Juan Echeverría | | (substituted on) 55' |
| PR | 18 | Ignacio Péculo | | (substituted on) 59' |
| LK | 19 | Juanjuan Garese | | (substituted on) 29' |
| LK | 20 | Diego Magno | | (substituted on) 56' |
| FL | 21 | Eric Dosantos | (yellow card) 72' to 80' | (substituted on) 52' |
| SH | 22 | Baltazar Amaya | | (substituted on) 61' |
| FB | 23 | Felipe Echeverry | | (substituted on) 59' |
| WG | 24 | Leandro Leivas | | (substituted on) 40' |
| FL | 25 | Marcos Chamyan | | (substituted on) 56' |
| HK | 26 | Guillermo Pujadas | | (substituted on) 70' |
Coach:
(Argentina) Esteban Meneses

| FB | 15 | Juan Bautista Daireaux |
| RW | 14 | Julián Quetglas | (substituted off) 52' |
| OC | 13 | Agustín Segura |
| IC | 12 | Juan Pablo Castro |
| LW | 11 | Martín Cancelliere | (substituted off) 55' |
| FH | 10 | Martín Elías | (substituted off) 48' |
| SH | 9 | Joaquín Pellandini | (substituted off) 48' |
| N8 | 8 | Conrado Roura | (substituted off) 48' |
| OF | 7 | Rodrigo Fernández Criado |
| BF | 6 | Lautaro Favaro |
| RL | 5 | Ignacio Calas | (substituted off) 56' |
| LL | 4 | Federico Gutiérrez | (substituted off) 52' |
| TP | 3 | Juan Pablo Zeiss (c) | (substituted off) 52' |
| HK | 2 | Axel Zapata | (substituted off) 59' |
| LP | 1 | Francisco Minervina | (substituted off) 48' |
Replacements:
| HK | 16 | Mariano Muntaner | (substituted on) 59' |
| PR | 17 | Nicolás Revol | (substituted on) 48' |
| LK | 18 | Manuel Bernstein | (substituted on) 59' |
| LK | 19 | Lautaro Simes | (substituted on) 52' |
| FL | 20 | Ignacio Gandini | (substituted on) 48' |
| SH | 21 | Rafael Iriarte | (substituted on) 48' |
| FB | 22 | Martín Bogado | (substituted on) 52' |
| FH | 23 | Gerónimo Prisciantelli | (substituted on) 48' |
| PR | 24 | Lucio Sordoni | (substituted on) 52' |
| WG | 25 | Tomás Molanos | (substituted on) 55' |
Coach:
(Argentina) Ignacio Fernández Lobbe

Assistant referees:
Matías Esteban (Uruguay)
Roberto Barreiro (Uruguay)

=== 7 July ===
7 July 2021
13:00 NZST (UTC+12)

| Tasman Mako HP XV (New Zealand) | 31–24 | Cook Islands |
| Try: Lewis 12' c Veamatahau 23' c MacDonald (2) 44' m, 51' m Napa'a 71' c Con: Parata (3/5) 13', 24', 72' | Report | Try: Toki 31' m Rudolph 40' c Bikaca 63' m Mato 67' c Con: Sopoaga (2/4) 40', 68' |

Tahunanui Fields, Nelson
Attendance: 100
Referee: NZR Appt. (New Zealand)

7 July 2021
20:00 AEST (UTC+10)

| Australia | 23–21 | France |
| Try: Paenga-Amosa 34' c Hooper 71' c Con: Lolesio (2/2) 36', 71'; Pen: Lolesio (4/4) 44', 60', 80+4' | Report | Try: Villière (2) 6' m, 22' c Con: Carbonel (1/2) 24'; Pen: Carbonel (2/2) 19', 52'; Jaminet (1/1) 62' |

Lang Park, Brisbane (Note: Relocated to Suncorp from the Sydney Cricket Ground following new lockdown measures in Sydney.)
Attendance: 20,000
Referee: Brendon Pickerill (New Zealand) (Note: Swapped appointments with Paul Williams (Samoa v Tonga) after travel restrictions changed between Australia and New Zealand and Williams was unable to travel to Australia.)

Team details

| FB | 15 | Tom Banks |
| RW | 14 | Tom Wright | (substituted off) 68' |
| OC | 13 | Hunter Paisami |
| IC | 12 | Matt To'omua |
| LW | 11 | Marika Koroibete |
| FH | 10 | Noah Lolesio |
| SH | 9 | Jake Gordon | (substituted off) 60' |
| N8 | 8 | Harry Wilson | (substituted off) 72' |
| BF | 7 | Michael Hooper (c) |
| OF | 6 | Rob Valetini |
| RL | 5 | Lukhan Salakaia-Loto |
| LL | 4 | Matt Philip | (substituted off) 55' |
| TP | 3 | Allan Alaalatoa | (substituted off) 52' |
| HK | 2 | Brandon Paenga-Amosa | (substituted off) 60' |
| LP | 1 | James Slipper | (substituted off) 63' |
Replacements:
| HK | 16 | Lachlan Lonergan | (substituted on) 60' |
| PR | 17 | Angus Bell | (substituted on) 63' |
| PR | 18 | Taniela Tupou | (substituted on) 52' |
| LK | 19 | Darcy Swain | (substituted on) 55' |
| N8 | 20 | Isi Naisarani | (substituted on) 72' |
| SH | 21 | Tate McDermott | (substituted on) 60' |
| CE | 22 | Len Ikitau |
| WG | 23 | Andrew Kellaway | (substituted on) 68' |
Coach:
(New Zealand) Dave Rennie

| FB | 15 | Melvyn Jaminet |
| RW | 14 | Damian Penaud |
| OC | 13 | Arthur Vincent |
| IC | 12 | Jonathan Danty |
| LW | 11 | Gabin Villière |
| FH | 10 | Louis Carbonel |
| SH | 9 | Baptiste Couilloud | (substituted off) 70' |
| N8 | 8 | Sekou Macalou | (substituted off) 54' |
| OF | 7 | Anthony Jelonch (c) |
| BF | 6 | Dylan Cretin |
| RL | 5 | Romain Taofifénua | (substituted off) 52' |
| LL | 4 | Kilian Geraci | (substituted off) 58' |
| TP | 3 | Demba Bamba | (substituted off) 52' |
| HK | 2 | Gaëtan Barlot | (substituted off) 60' |
| LP | 1 | Jean-Baptiste Gros | (substituted off) 60' |
Replacements:
| HK | 16 | Anthony Étrillard | (substituted on) 60' |
| PR | 17 | Quentin Walcker | (substituted on) 60' |
| PR | 18 | Sipili Falatea | (substituted on) 52' |
| FL | 19 | Baptiste Pesenti | (substituted on) 52' |
| LK | 20 | Cyril Cazeaux | (substituted on) 58' |
| FL | 21 | Cameron Woki | (substituted on) 54' |
| SH | 22 | Teddy Iribaren | (substituted on) 70' |
| FB | 23 | Anthony Bouthier |
Coach:
(France) Fabien Galthié

Assistant referees:
Nic Berry (Australia)
Damon Murphy (Australia)
Television match official:
James Doleman (New Zealand)

Notes:

- Florent Vanverberghe (France) had been named on the bench, but withdrew the day before the game due to injury and was replaced by Cyril Cazeaux.
- Andrew Kellaway Lachlan Lonergan and Darcy Swain (all Australia) and Gaëtan Barlot, Anthony Étrillard, Sipili Falatea, Teddy Iribaren, Melvyn Jaminet and Quentin Walcker (all France) made their international debuts.

=== 9/10 July ===
9 July 2021
19:00 SAST (UTC+02)

| South Africa | Cancelled (Note: Match was called off following 12 positive COVID-19 cases in the South African camp and a further 4 in the Georgian team.) | Georgia |

Ellis Park Stadium, Johannesburg
Referee: Frank Murphy (Ireland)

10 July 2021
19:05 NZST (UTC+12)

| New Zealand | 57–23 | Fiji |
| Try: J. Barrett 9' c Havili (2) 18' c', 21' c Bridge 44' m Coles (4) 52' m, 64' c, 73' c, 76' c Jordan 69' m Con: Barrett (6/9) 10', 18', 22', 65', 74', 77' | Report | Try: Tuisue 28' m Kunavula 48' m Penalty try 61'; Pen: Volavola (2/2) 6', 13' |

Forsyth Barr Stadium, Dunedin
Attendance: 15,103
Referee: Paul Williams (New Zealand) (Note: Replaces Nic Berry after travel restrictions meant Berry was unable to travel to New Zealand.)

Team details

| FB | 15 | Jordie Barrett | | | | (substituted off) 68' |
| RW | 14 | Sevu Reece |
| OC | 13 | Rieko Ioane |
| IC | 12 | David Havili | (yellow card) 61' to 71' |
| LW | 11 | George Bridge | | (substituted off) 66' |
| FH | 10 | Beauden Barrett | | (substituted off) 24' | (substituted on) 34' |
| SH | 9 | Aaron Smith (c) | | (substituted off) 68' |
| N8 | 8 | Hoskins Sotutu | | (substituted off) 66' |
| OF | 7 | Ethan Blackadder |
| BF | 6 | Shannon Frizell |
| RL | 5 | Brodie Retallick |
| LL | 4 | Patrick Tuipulotu | | (substituted off) 57' |
| TP | 3 | Nepo Laulala | | (substituted off) 50' |
| HK | 2 | Codie Taylor | | (substituted off) 50' |
| LP | 1 | George Bower | | (substituted off) 50' |
Replacements:
| HK | 16 | Dane Coles | | (substituted on) 50' |
| PR | 17 | Ethan de Groot | | (substituted on) 50' |
| PR | 18 | Tyrel Lomax | | (substituted on) 50' |
| LK | 19 | Sam Whitelock | | (substituted on) 57' |
| N8 | 20 | Luke Jacobson | | (substituted on) 66' |
| SH | 21 | Finlay Christie | | (substituted on) 68' |
| FB | 22 | Damian McKenzie | | (substituted on) 24' | (substituted off) 34' | (substituted on) 68' |
| WG | 23 | Will Jordan | | (substituted on) 66' |
Coach:
(New Zealand) Ian Foster

| FB | 15 | Kini Murimurivalu | (yellow card) 52' to 62' | (substituted off) 74' | (substituted on) 77' |
| RW | 14 | Eroni Sau | | | (substituted off) 77' |
| OC | 13 | Waisea Nayacalevu |
| IC | 12 | Levani Botia (c) |
| LW | 11 | Nemani Nadolo | | (substituted off) 44' |
| FH | 10 | Ben Volavola |
| SH | 9 | Simione Kuruvoli | | (substituted off) 52' |
| N8 | 8 | Albert Tuisue |
| OF | 7 | Mesulame Kunavula | | (substituted off) 54' |
| BF | 6 | John Dyer |
| RL | 5 | Leone Nakarawa |
| LL | 4 | Temo Mayanavanua | | (substituted off) 61' |
| TP | 3 | Mesake Doge | | (substituted off) 61' |
| HK | 2 | Samuel Matavesi | | (substituted off) 71' |
| LP | 1 | Peni Ravai | | (substituted off) 52' |
Replacements:
| HK | 16 | Peniami Narisia | | (substituted on) 71' |
| PR | 17 | Haereiti Hetet | | (substituted on) 52' |
| PR | 18 | Lee Roy Atalifo | | (substituted on) 61' |
| LK | 19 | Tevita Ratuva | | (substituted on) 61' |
| FL | 20 | Peceli Yato | | (substituted on) 54' |
| FB | 21 | Seta Tuicuvu | | (substituted on) 52' |
| CE | 22 | Eneriko Buliruarua | | (substituted on) 74' |
| WG | 23 | Manasa Mataele | | (substituted on) 44' |
Coach:
(New Zealand) Vern Cotter

Assistant referees:
Mike Fraser (New Zealand)
Jono Bredin (New Zealand)
Television match official:
Chris Hart (New Zealand)

Notes:

- Ethan de Groot (New Zealand) and Eneriko Buliruarua, Manasa Mataele and Peniami Narisia (all Fiji) made their international debuts.

10 July 2021
13:00 BST (UTC+01)

| Argentina | 20–20 | Wales |
| Try: Matera 39' c De la Fuente 46' c Con: Sánchez (2/2) 41', 47'; Pen: Sánchez (2/4) 16', 45' | Report | Try: Rowlands 51' c Williams 71' c Con: Evans (2/2) 52', 72'; Pen: Sheedy (2/2) 18', 27' |

Millennium Stadium, Cardiff (Note: Although held in Cardiff, the game was listed as a home game for Argentina.)
Attendance: 8,200
Referee: Matthew Carley (England)

Team details

| FB | 15 | Juan Cruz Mallía | (red card) 29' |
| RW | 14 | Santiago Carreras | | (substituted off) 27' |
| OC | 13 | Matías Moroni |
| IC | 12 | Jerónimo de la Fuente |
| LW | 11 | Santiago Cordero |
| FH | 10 | Nicolás Sánchez | | (substituted off) 69' |
| SH | 9 | Tomás Cubelli | | (substituted off) 66' |
| N8 | 8 | Rodrigo Bruni | | (substituted off) 28' | (substituted on) 34' |
| OF | 7 | Facundo Isa | | (substituted off) 55' |
| BF | 6 | Pablo Matera |
| RL | 5 | Marcos Kremer | | (substituted off) 65' |
| LL | 4 | Guido Petti |
| TP | 3 | Francisco Gómez Kodela | | (substituted off) 62' |
| HK | 2 | Julián Montoya (c) | | (substituted off) 74' |
| LP | 1 | Nahuel Tetaz Chaparro | (yellow card) 28' to 38' | | | (substituted off) 59' |
Replacements:
| HK | 16 | Facundo Bosch | | (substituted on) 74' |
| PR | 17 | Facundo Gigena | | (substituted on) 28' | (substituted off) 34' | (substituted on) 59' |
| PR | 18 | Santiago Medrano | | (substituted on) 62' |
| LK | 19 | Tomás Lavanini | | (substituted on) 55' |
| LK | 20 | Matías Alemanno | | (substituted on) 65' |
| SH | 21 | Gonzalo Bertranou | | (substituted on) 66' |
| FH | 22 | Domingo Miotti | | (substituted on) 69' |
| CE | 23 | Santiago Chocobares | | (substituted on) 27' |
Coach:
(Argentina) Mario Ledesma

| FB | 15 | Hallam Amos |
| RW | 14 | Jonah Holmes |
| OC | 13 | Willis Halaholo | | (substituted off) 43' |
| IC | 12 | Jonathan Davies (c) |
| LW | 11 | Owen Lane |
| FH | 10 | Callum Sheedy | | (substituted off) 47' |
| SH | 9 | Kieran Hardy | | (substituted off) 47' |
| N8 | 8 | Aaron Wainwright | | (substituted off) 23' |
| OF | 7 | James Botham | | (substituted off) 65' |
| BF | 6 | Ross Moriarty |
| RL | 5 | Will Rowlands |
| LL | 4 | Ben Carter |
| TP | 3 | Dillon Lewis | (yellow card) 28' to 38' | | | | (substituted off) 64' |
| HK | 2 | Elliot Dee | | (substituted off) 65' |
| LP | 1 | Nicky Smith | | (substituted off) 56' |
Replacements:
| HK | 16 | Ryan Elias | | (substituted on) 65' |
| PR | 17 | Gareth Thomas | | (substituted on) 56' |
| PR | 18 | Leon Brown | | | (substituted on) 28' | (substituted off) 34' | (substituted on) 64' |
| FL | 19 | Josh Turnbull | | (substituted on) 23' | (substituted off) 28' | (substituted on) 34' |
| FL | 20 | Taine Basham | | (substituted on) 65' |
| SH | 21 | Tomos Williams | | (substituted on) 47' |
| FH | 22 | Jarrod Evans | | (substituted on) 47' |
| CE | 23 | Nick Tompkins | | (substituted on) 43' |
Coach:
(New Zealand) Wayne Pivac

Player of the Match:
Hallam Amos (Wales)

Assistant referees:
Luke Pearce (England)
Karl Dickson (England)
Television match official:
Claire Hodnett (England)

Notes:

- This is the first draw between these two nations in 19 meetings.

10 July 2021
15:00 BST (UTC+01)

| England | 70–14 | Canada |
| Try: Blamire (3) 1' c, 40' c', 59' c Radwan (3) 15' c, 50' c, 61' c Cokanasiga (2) 20' c, 23' c Genge 46' c Penalty try 13'; Con: Smith (9/9) 2', 16', 22', 25', 41', 46', 52', 60', 63' | Report | Try: Braude 10' c Lloyd 33' c Con: Nelson (2/2) 11', 34' |

Twickenham Stadium, London
Attendance: 10,000
Referee: Craig Evans (Wales) (Note: Evans replaces Romain Poite after he got injured during the later stages of the 2020–21 Top 14 season.)

Team details

| FB | 15 | Freddie Steward |
| RW | 14 | Joe Cokanasiga | | (substituted off) 60' |
| OC | 13 | Henry Slade |
| IC | 12 | Dan Kelly |
| LW | 11 | Adam Radwan |
| FH | 10 | Marcus Smith | | (substituted off) 66' |
| SH | 9 | Harry Randall | | (substituted off) 52' |
| N8 | 8 | Alex Dombrandt |
| OF | 7 | Sam Underhill |
| BF | 6 | Lewis Ludlow (c) | (yellow card) 30' to 40' | (substituted off) 55' |
| RL | 5 | Charlie Ewels |
| LL | 4 | Harry Wells | | (substituted off) 60' |
| TP | 3 | Joe Heyes | | (substituted off) 47' |
| HK | 2 | Jamie Blamire | | (substituted off) 60' |
| LP | 1 | Ellis Genge | | (substituted off) 57' |
Replacements:
| HK | 16 | Curtis Langdon | | (substituted on) 60' |
| PR | 17 | Beno Obano | | (substituted on) 57' |
| PR | 18 | Paul Hill | | (substituted on) 47' |
| FL | 19 | Callum Chick | | (substituted on) 60' |
| FL | 20 | Lewis Ludlam | | (substituted on) 55' |
| SH | 21 | Dan Robson | | (substituted on) 52' |
| FB | 22 | George Furbank | | (substituted on) 66' |
| CE | 23 | Joe Marchant | | (substituted on) 60' |
Coach:
(Australia) Eddie Jones

| FB | 15 | Cooper Coats |
| RW | 14 | Cole Davis |
| OC | 13 | Ben LeSage | | 52' to 57' |
| IC | 12 | Lockie Kratz | | | (substituted off) 57' |
| LW | 11 | Kainoa Lloyd |
| FH | 10 | Peter Nelson | | (substituted off) 74' |
| SH | 9 | Ross Braude | | (substituted off) 48' |
| N8 | 8 | Siaki Vikilani | | | (substituted off) 69' |
| OF | 7 | Lucas Rumball (c) |
| BF | 6 | Corey Thomas |
| RL | 5 | Conor Keys | | 63' to 69' |
| LL | 4 | Reegan O'Gorman | (yellow card) 13' to 23' | (substituted off) 52' |
| TP | 3 | Jake Ilnicki | | (substituted off) 30' |
| HK | 2 | Andrew Quattrin | | (substituted off) 57' |
| LP | 1 | Djustice Sears-Duru | | (substituted off) 74' |
Replacements:
| HK | 16 | Eric Howard | | (substituted on) 57' |
| PR | 17 | Cole Keith | | (substituted on) 30' |
| PR | 18 | Liam Murray | | (substituted on) 74' |
| FL | 19 | Don Carson | | (substituted on) 63' |
| FL | 20 | Michael Smith | | (substituted on) 52' |
| CE | 21 | Quinn Ngawati | | (substituted on) 52' |
| SH | 22 | William Percillier | | (substituted on) 48' |
| FH | 23 | Robbie Povey | | (substituted on) 74' |
Coach:
(Wales) Kingsley Jones

Player of the Match:
Ellis Genge (England)

Assistant referees:
Pierre Brousset (France)
Chris Busby (Ireland)
Television match official:
Ben Whitehouse (Wales)

Notes:

- Alex Dombrandt, Dan Kelly, Adam Radwan and Harry Wells (all England) and Lockie Kratz, Liam Murray and Corey Thomas (all Canada) made their international debuts.
- England's opening try was their quickest test try since Jonathan Webb scored in 23 seconds vs Ireland at Twickenham in 1992.
- Adam Radwan became the sixth English player to score a hat trick on test debut, the last was Jeremy Guscott against Romania in 1989.
- Jamie Blamire became the second English hooker to score a test hat trick after Jamie George became the first against Georgia during the Autumn Nations Cup.

10 July 2021
21:00 EEST (UTC+03)

| Romania | Cancelled (Note: Match was called off following a number of COVID-19 positive cases within the Scottish camp.) | Scotland |

Stadionul Arcul de Triumf, Bucharest
Referee: Nika Amashukeli (Georgia)

10 July 2021
19:15 IST (UTC+01)

| Ireland | 71–10 | United States |
| Try: Baloucoune 17' c Kelleher (4) 24' c, 30' c, 44' c, 54' c Timoney 27' c McCloskey 56' m Keenan 62' c Coombes 71' c Bealham 80' c Con: Carbery (5/5) 19', 25', 28', 31', 45'; H. Byrne (3/4) 55', 64', 72'; Addison (1/1) 80'; Pen: Carbery (1/1) 8' | Report | Try: Baska 78' c Con: Magie (1/1) 79'; Pen: Carty (1/1) 20' |

Aviva Stadium, Dublin
Attendance: 6,000
Referee: Mathieu Raynal (France)

Team details

| FB | 15 | Hugo Keenan |
| RW | 14 | Robert Baloucoune |
| OC | 13 | James Hume |
| IC | 12 | Stuart McCloskey |
| LW | 11 | Andrew Conway | (substituted off) 40' |
| FH | 10 | Joey Carbery | (substituted off) 54' |
| SH | 9 | Craig Casey | (substituted off) 59' |
| N8 | 8 | Gavin Coombes |
| OF | 7 | Nick Timoney | (substituted off) 54' |
| BF | 6 | Caelan Doris |
| RL | 5 | James Ryan (c) |
| LL | 4 | Ryan Baird | (substituted off) 57' |
| TP | 3 | Tom O'Toole | (substituted off) 73' |
| HK | 2 | Ronan Kelleher | (substituted off) 55' |
| LP | 1 | Dave Kilcoyne | (substituted off) 55' |
Replacements:
| HK | 16 | Dave Heffernan | (substituted on) 55' |
| PR | 17 | Ed Byrne | (substituted on) 55' |
| PR | 18 | Finlay Bealham | (substituted on) 73' |
| LK | 19 | Fineen Wycherley | (substituted on) 57' |
| FL | 20 | Paul Boyle | (substituted on) 54' |
| SH | 21 | Caolin Blade | (substituted on) 59' |
| FH | 22 | Harry Byrne | (substituted on) 54' |
| FB | 23 | Will Addison | (substituted on) 40' |
Coach:
(England) Andy Farrell

| FB | 15 | Mike Te'o |
| RW | 14 | Christian Dyer | | (substituted off) 70' |
| OC | 13 | Calvin Whiting |
| IC | 12 | Bryce Campbell (c) |
| LW | 11 | Mika Kruse |
| FH | 10 | Luke Carty |
| SH | 9 | Ruben de Haas | | (substituted off) 59' |
| N8 | 8 | Cam Dolan | | (substituted off) 73' |
| OF | 7 | Riekert Hattingh | (red card) 54' |
| BF | 6 | Hanco Germishuys | | (substituted off) 66' |
| RL | 5 | Nick Civetta |
| LL | 4 | Greg Peterson | | (substituted off) 40' |
| TP | 3 | Paul Mullen | | (substituted off) 55' |
| HK | 2 | Joe Taufete'e | | (substituted off) 48' |
| LP | 1 | David Ainu'u | | (substituted off) 68' |
Replacements:
| HK | 16 | Kapeli Pifeleti | | (substituted on) 48' |
| PR | 17 | Matt Harmon | | (substituted on) 68' |
| PR | 18 | Dino Waldren | | (substituted on) 55' |
| LK | 19 | Nate Brakeley | | (substituted on) 40' |
| FL | 20 | Psalm Wooching | | (substituted on) 66' |
| FL | 21 | Andrew Guerra | | (substituted on) 73' |
| SH | 22 | Michael Baska | | (substituted on) 59' |
| FH | 23 | Will Magie | | (substituted on) 70' |
Coach:
(South Africa) Gary Gold

Player of the Match:
Ronan Kelleher (Ireland)

Assistant referees:
Adam Jones (Wales)
Ben Blain (Scotland)
Television match official:
Eric Gauzins (France)

Notes:

- Robert Baloucoune, Caolin Blade, Paul Boyle, Harry Byrne, James Hume, Tom O'Toole, Nick Timoney and Fineen Wycherley (all Ireland) and Andrew Guerra (United States) made their international debuts.
- Ronan Kelleher became the fourth Irish player to score four tries in a test match.
- Ireland registered their largest home win against the United States.

=== 13 July ===
13 July 2021
20:00 AEST (UTC+10)

| Australia | 26–28 | France |
| Try: Gordon 38' c Hooper 71' c Con: Lolesio (2/2) 40', 72'; Pen: Lolesio (4/4) 17', 26', 46', 75' | Report | Try: Penaud 22' c Con: Jaminet (1/1) 23'; Pen: Jaminet (7/7) 2', 10', 35', 51', 56', 63', 78' |

Melbourne Rectangular Stadium, Melbourne
Attendance: 20,113
Referee: James Doleman (New Zealand)

Team details

| FB | 15 | Tom Banks |
| RW | 14 | Tom Wright | (substituted off) 56' |
| OC | 13 | Hunter Paisami | | (substituted off) 72' |
| IC | 12 | Matt To'omua | (substituted off) 67' | (substituted on) 72' |
| LW | 11 | Marika Koroibete |
| FH | 10 | Noah Lolesio |
| SH | 9 | Jake Gordon | (substituted off) 56' |
| N8 | 8 | Harry Wilson |
| BF | 7 | Michael Hooper (c) |
| OF | 6 | Rob Valetini |
| RL | 5 | Lukhan Salakaia-Loto |
| LL | 4 | Matt Philip | (substituted off) 63' |
| TP | 3 | Taniela Tupou | (substituted off) 51' |
| HK | 2 | Brandon Paenga-Amosa | (substituted off) 67' |
| LP | 1 | James Slipper | (substituted off) 63' |
Replacements:
| HK | 16 | Lachlan Lonergan | (substituted on) 67' |
| PR | 17 | Angus Bell | (substituted on) 63' |
| PR | 18 | Allan Alaalatoa | (substituted on) 51' |
| LK | 19 | Darcy Swain | (substituted on) 63' |
| N8 | 20 | Isi Naisarani | (substituted on) 63' |
| SH | 21 | Tate McDermott | (substituted on) 56' |
| CE | 22 | Len Ikitau | (substituted on) 67' |
| WG | 23 | Andrew Kellaway | (substituted on) 56' |
Coach:
(New Zealand) Dave Rennie

| FB | 15 | Melvyn Jaminet |
| RW | 14 | Damian Penaud |
| OC | 13 | Arthur Vincent |
| IC | 12 | Jonathan Danty |
| LW | 11 | Gabin Villière |
| FH | 10 | Louis Carbonel |
| SH | 9 | Baptiste Couilloud | (substituted off) 78' |
| N8 | 8 | Anthony Jelonch (c) |
| OF | 7 | Cameron Woki |
| BF | 6 | Ibrahim Diallo | (substituted off) 67' |
| RL | 5 | Cyril Cazeaux | (substituted off) 51' |
| LL | 4 | Pierre-Henri Azagoh | (substituted off) 63' |
| TP | 3 | Wilfrid Hounkpatin | (substituted off) 51' |
| HK | 2 | Gaëtan Barlot | (substituted off) 67' |
| LP | 1 | Jean-Baptiste Gros | (substituted off) 63' |
Replacements:
| HK | 16 | Anthony Étrillard | (substituted on) 67' |
| PR | 17 | Enzo Forletta | (substituted on) 63' |
| PR | 18 | Demba Bamba | (substituted on) 51' |
| LK | 19 | Kilian Geraci | (substituted on) 63' | (substituted off) 72' |
| LK | 20 | Romain Taofifénua | (substituted on) 51' |
| FL | 21 | Sekou Macalou | (substituted on) 67' |
| SH | 22 | Teddy Iribaren | (substituted on) 78' |
| FB | 23 | Anthony Bouthier | | (substituted on) 72' |
Coach:
(France) Fabien Galthié

Assistant referees:
Nic Berry (Australia)
Damon Murphy (Australia)
Television match official:
Brendon Pickerill (New Zealand)

Notes:

- Len Ikitau (Australia) and Pierre-Henri Azagoh, Ibrahim Diallo, Enzo Forletta and Wilfrid Hounkpatin (all France) made their international debuts.
- France win in Australia for the first time since their 28–19 victory in Sydney in the final test of their 1990 tour.

=== 17 July ===
17 July 2021
12:00 NZST (UTC+12)

| New Zealand U20 | 73–0 | Cook Islands |

Dilworth School, Auckland
Referee: NZR Appt. (New Zealand)

17 July 2021
19:05 NZST (UTC+12)

| New Zealand | 60–13 | Fiji |
| Try: Reece (3) 15' c, 31' c, 36' m Savea 40' c Jordan 42' c R. Ioane 49' c Taukei'aho (2) 59' m, 80' c Frizell 68' c Con: Mo'unga (5/6) 15', 33', 40', 42', 51'; B. Barrett (2/3) 69', 80'; Pen: Mo'unga (1/1) 29' | Report | Try: Ravai 44' c Con: Volavola (1/1) 46'; Pen: Volavola (2/2) 5', 18' |

Waikato Stadium, Hamilton
Attendance: 25,800
Referee: Damon Murphy (Australia) (Note: Replaces Angus Gardner after failing to recover from injury sustained in early 2021.)

Team details

| FB | 15 | Damian McKenzie |
| RW | 14 | Will Jordan | (substituted off) 43' |
| OC | 13 | Anton Lienert-Brown |
| IC | 12 | David Havili |
| LW | 11 | Sevu Reece |
| FH | 10 | Richie Mo'unga | (substituted off) 58' |
| SH | 9 | Aaron Smith | (substituted off) 64' |
| N8 | 8 | Luke Jacobson |
| OF | 7 | Ardie Savea |
| BF | 6 | Akira Ioane | (substituted off) 67' |
| RL | 5 | Sam Whitelock (c) |
| LL | 4 | Scott Barrett | (substituted off) 55' |
| TP | 3 | Nepo Laulala | (substituted off) 50' |
| HK | 2 | Codie Taylor | (substituted off) 55' |
| LP | 1 | George Bower | (substituted off) 50' |
Replacements:
| HK | 16 | Samisoni Taukei'aho | (substituted on) 55' |
| PR | 17 | Ethan de Groot | (substituted on) 50' |
| PR | 18 | Angus Ta'avao | (substituted on) 50' |
| LK | 19 | Brodie Retallick | (substituted on) 55' |
| FL | 20 | Shannon Frizell | (substituted on) 67' |
| SH | 21 | Brad Weber | (substituted on) 64' |
| FH | 22 | Beauden Barrett | (substituted on) 58' |
| CE | 23 | Rieko Ioane | (substituted on) 43' |
Coach:
(New Zealand) Ian Foster

| FB | 15 | Kini Murimurivalu | | (substituted off) 64' |
| RW | 14 | Seta Tuicuvu |
| OC | 13 | Waisea Nayacalevu |
| IC | 12 | Eneriko Buliruarua |
| LW | 11 | Nemani Nadolo | | (substituted off) 55' |
| FH | 10 | Ben Volavola | | (substituted off) 74' |
| SH | 9 | Frank Lomani |
| N8 | 8 | Peceli Yato | | (substituted off) 64' | (substituted on) 71' |
| OF | 7 | Mesulame Kunavula | | | (substituted off) 71' |
| BF | 6 | John Dyer | | (substituted off) 42' |
| RL | 5 | Leone Nakarawa (c) | (yellow card) 37' to 47' |
| LL | 4 | Temo Mayanavanua |
| TP | 3 | Mesake Doge | | (substituted off) 60' |
| HK | 2 | Sam Matavesi | | (substituted off) 69' |
| LP | 1 | Peni Ravai | | (substituted off) 60' |
Replacements:
| HK | 16 | Mesu Dolokoto | | (substituted on) 69' |
| PR | 17 | Eroni Mawi | | (substituted on) 60' |
| PR | 18 | Lee Roy Atalifo | | (substituted on) 60' |
| LK | 19 | Albert Tuisue | | (substituted on) 42' |
| FL | 20 | Kitione Kamikamica | | (substituted on) 64' |
| SH | 21 | Moses Sorovi | | (substituted on) 64' |
| FH | 22 | Teti Tela | | (substituted on) 74' |
| WG | 23 | Manasa Mataele | | (substituted on) 55' |
Coach:
(New Zealand) Vern Cotter

Assistant referees:
Graham Cooper (Australia)
Jordan Way (Australia)
Television match official:
Aaron Patterson (New Zealand)

Notes:

- Dane Coles (New Zealand) was named on the bench but was withdrawn due to injury and replaced by Samisoni Taukei'aho.
- Samisoni Taukei'aho (New Zealand) and Kitione Kamikamica, Moses Sorovi and Teti Tela (all Fiji) made their international debut.
- Ardie Savea and Anton Lienert-Brown (New Zealand) earned their 50th test cap.

17 July 2021
20:00 AEST (UTC+10)

| Australia | 33–30 | France |
| Try: McDermott 11' c Lolesio 20' c Tupou 51' c Con: Lolesio (3/3) 12', 21', 53'; Pen: Lolesio (4/5) 26', 40', 73', 79' | Report | Try: Couilloud 8' c Woki 36' c Barassi 47' c Con: Jaminet (3/3) 9', 37', 48'; Pen: Jaminet (3/4) 4', 14', 75' |

Lang Park, Brisbane
Attendance: 34,164
Referee: Ben O'Keeffe (New Zealand)

Team details

| FB | 15 | Tom Banks |
| RW | 14 | Filipo Daugunu | | (substituted off) 2' |
| OC | 13 | Len Ikitau |
| IC | 12 | Hunter Paisami | | (substituted off) 78' |
| LW | 11 | Marika Koroibete | (red card) 5' |
| FH | 10 | Noah Lolesio |
| SH | 9 | Tate McDermott | | (substituted off) 73' |
| N8 | 8 | Isi Naisarani | | (substituted off) 71' |
| BF | 7 | Michael Hooper (c) |
| OF | 6 | Lachlan Swinton | | (substituted off) 55' |
| RL | 5 | Lukhan Salakaia-Loto |
| LL | 4 | Darcy Swain |
| TP | 3 | Allan Alaalatoa | | (substituted off) 47' |
| HK | 2 | Brandon Paenga-Amosa | | (substituted off) 75' |
| LP | 1 | James Slipper | | (substituted off) 47' |
Replacements:
| HK | 16 | Jordan Uelese | | (substituted on) 75' |
| PR | 17 | Angus Bell | | (substituted on) 47' |
| PR | 18 | Taniela Tupou | | (substituted on) 47' |
| LK | 19 | Matt Philip | | (substituted on) 71' |
| FL | 20 | Rob Valetini | | (substituted on) 55' |
| SH | 21 | Jake Gordon | | (substituted on) 73' |
| CE | 22 | Matt To'omua | | (substituted on) 78' |
| FB | 23 | Reece Hodge | | (substituted on) 2' |
Coach:
(New Zealand) Dave Rennie

| FB | 15 | Melvyn Jaminet |
| RW | 14 | Damian Penaud |
| OC | 13 | Pierre-Louis Barassi |
| IC | 12 | Arthur Vincent |
| LW | 11 | Teddy Thomas | (substituted off) 59' |
| FH | 10 | Antoine Hastoy | (substituted off) 67' |
| SH | 9 | Baptiste Couilloud |
| N8 | 8 | Anthony Jelonch (c) | (substituted off) 5' | (substituted on) 17' |
| OF | 7 | Cameron Woki |
| BF | 6 | Dylan Cretin | | | (substituted off) 62' |
| RL | 5 | Romain Taofifénua | (substituted off) 63' |
| LL | 4 | Pierre-Henri Azagoh |
| TP | 3 | Sipili Falatea | (substituted off) 47' |
| HK | 2 | Gaëtan Barlot | (substituted off) 59' |
| LP | 1 | Enzo Forletta | (substituted off) 62' |
Replacements:
| HK | 16 | Anthony Étrillard | (substituted on) 59' |
| PR | 17 | Quentin Walcker | (substituted on) 62' |
| PR | 18 | Demba Bamba | (substituted on) 47' |
| FL | 19 | Baptiste Pesenti | (substituted on) 63' |
| FL | 20 | Alexandre Bécognée | (substituted on) 5' | (substituted off) 17' | (substituted on) 62' |
| SH | 21 | Teddy Iribaren |
| FB | 22 | Anthony Bouthier | (substituted on) 67' |
| CE | 23 | Julien Hériteau | (substituted on) 59' |
Coach:
(France) Fabien Galthié

Assistant referees:
Mike Fraser (New Zealand)
Brendon Pickerill (New Zealand)
Television match official:
Glenn Newman (New Zealand)

Notes:

- Cyril Cazeaux (France) was named to start but withdrew ahead of the game and was replaced by Pierre-Henri Azagoh. Baptiste Pesenti replaced Azagoh on the bench.
- Alexandre Bécognée, Antoine Hastoy and Julien Hériteau (all France) made their international debuts.
- Australia retained the Trophée des Bicentenaires.
- Australia win a home test-series for the first time since France last toured to Australia in 2014.

17 July 2021
13:00 SAST (UTC+02)

| South Africa A | 14–17 | (South Africa) Bulls |
| Try: Fassi 12' c Simelane 38' c Con: Jantjies (2/2) 13', 39' | Report | Try: Johannes 66' c Grobbelaar 68' c Con: Goosen (2/2) 68', 69'; Pen: C. Smith (1/1) 76' |

Cape Town Stadium, Cape Town
Attendance: 0
Referee: Marius van der Westhuizen (South Africa)

Team details

| FB | 15 | Aphelele Fassi |
| RW | 14 | Yaw Penxe | | (substituted off) 64' |
| OC | 13 | Wandisile Simelane | (yellow card) 17' to 27' | (substituted off) 55' |
| IC | 12 | Damian de Allende | | (substituted off) 55' |
| LW | 11 | Rosko Specman |
| FH | 10 | Elton Jantjies (c) |
| SH | 9 | Cobus Reinach | | (substituted off) 50' |
| N8 | 8 | Kwagga Smith |
| BF | 7 | Rynhardt Elstadt |
| OF | 6 | Marco van Staden | | (substituted off) 56' |
| RL | 5 | Nico Janse van Rensburg |
| LL | 4 | Jean-Luc du Preez |
| TP | 3 | Vincent Koch | | (substituted off) 53' |
| HK | 2 | Joseph Dweba | | (substituted off) 51' |
| LP | 1 | Coenie Oosthuizen | | (substituted off) 24' |
Replacements (from):
| HK | 16 | Fez Mbatha | | (substituted on) 51' |
| PR | 17 | Thomas du Toit | | (substituted on) 24' | (substituted off) 71' |
| PR | 18 | Wilco Louw | | (substituted on) 53' |
| LF | 19 | Jasper Wiese | | (substituted on) 56' |
| SH | 20 | Sanele Nohamba | | (substituted on) 50' |
| WG | 21 | Sbu Nkosi | | (substituted on) 64' |
| CE | 22 | Jesse Kriel | | (substituted on) 55' |
| FB | 23 | Damian Willemse | | (substituted on) 55' |
| PR | 24 | Lizo Gqoboka | | | (substituted on) 71' |
Coach:
(South Africa) Jacques Nienaber

| FB | 15 | FC du Plessis |
| RW | 14 | Marco Jansen van Vuren |
| OC | 13 | Harold Vorster |
| IC | 12 | Cornal Hendricks |
| LW | 11 | Stravino Jacobs | (substituted off) 40' |
| FH | 10 | Johan Goosen | (substituted off) 71' |
| SH | 9 | Zak Burger | (substituted off) 52' |
| N8 | 8 | WJ Steenkamp |
| OF | 7 | Muller Uys |
| BF | 6 | Nizaam Carr (c) |
| RL | 5 | Ruan Nortjé |
| LL | 4 | Walt Steenkamp |
| TP | 3 | Jacques van Rooyen | (substituted off) 40' |
| HK | 2 | Schalk Erasmus | (substituted on) 34' |
| LP | 1 | Simphiwe Matanzima | (substituted off) 40' |
Replacements:
| HK | 16 | Johan Grobbelaar | (substituted off) 34' |
| PR | 17 | Gerhard Steenekamp | (substituted on) 40' |
| PR | 18 | Mornay Smith | (substituted on) 40' |
| LK | 19 | Janko Swanepoel |
| LF | 20 | Arno Botha |
| SH | 21 | Keagan Johannes | (substituted on) 52' |
| FH | 22 | Chris Smith | (substituted on) 71' |
| WG | 23 | David Kriel | (substituted on) 40' |
Coach:
(South Africa) Jake White

Player of the Match:
Johan Goosen (Bulls)

Assistant referees:
Rasta Rasivhenge (South Africa)
Aimee Barrett-Theron (South Africa)
Television match official:
Marius Jonker (South Africa)

17 July 2021
15:00 BST (UTC+01)

| Argentina | 33–11 | Wales |
| Try: Moroni 11' c Cubelli 28' c Matera 79' c Con: Sánchez (3/3) 12', 29', 79'; Pen: Sánchez (4/4) 26', 57', 65', 76' | Report | Try: Lane 8' c Con: Evans (0/1); Pen: Evans (2/2) 31', 51' |

Millennium Stadium, Cardiff (Note: Although held in Cardiff, the game was listed as a home game for Argentina.)
Attendance: 8,200
Referee: Luke Pearce (England)

Team details

| FB | 15 | Santiago Carreras | (substituted off) 72' |
| RW | 14 | Bautista Delguy | (substituted off) 51' |
| OC | 13 | Santiago Chocobares |
| IC | 12 | Jerónimo de la Fuente |
| LW | 11 | Matías Moroni |
| FH | 10 | Nicolás Sánchez |
| SH | 9 | Tomás Cubelli | (substituted off) 69' |
| N8 | 8 | Rodrigo Bruni |
| OF | 7 | Facundo Isa | (substituted off) 48' |
| BF | 6 | Pablo Matera |
| RL | 5 | Marcos Kremer | (substituted off) 54' |
| LL | 4 | Guido Petti |
| TP | 3 | Francisco Gómez Kodela | (substituted off) 48' |
| HK | 2 | Julián Montoya (c) | (substituted off) 70' |
| LP | 1 | Nahuel Tetaz Chaparro | (substituted off) 54' |
Replacements:
| HK | 16 | Facundo Bosch | (substituted on) 70' |
| PR | 17 | Facundo Gigena | (substituted on) 54' |
| PR | 18 | Santiago Medrano | (substituted on) 48' |
| LK | 19 | Tomás Lavanini | (substituted on) 48' |
| LK | 20 | Matías Alemanno | (substituted on) 54' |
| SH | 21 | Felipe Ezcurra | (substituted on) 69' |
| FH | 22 | Domingo Miotti | (substituted on) 72' |
| CE | 23 | Juan Imhoff | (substituted on) 51' |
Coach:
(Argentina) Mario Ledesma

| FB | 15 | Hallam Amos |
| RW | 14 | Owen Lane |
| OC | 13 | Nick Tompkins |
| IC | 12 | Jonathan Davies (c) |
| LW | 11 | Tom Rogers | (substituted off) 51' |
| FH | 10 | Jarrod Evans | (substituted off) 62' |
| SH | 9 | Tomos Williams | (substituted off) 62' |
| N8 | 8 | Ross Moriarty |
| OF | 7 | James Botham | (substituted off) 62' |
| BF | 6 | Josh Turnbull |
| RL | 5 | Will Rowlands |
| LL | 4 | Ben Carter | (substituted off) 49' |
| TP | 3 | Leon Brown | (substituted off) 49' |
| HK | 2 | Elliot Dee | (substituted off) 49' |
| LP | 1 | Gareth Thomas | (substituted off) 57' |
Replacements:
| HK | 16 | Sam Parry | (substituted on) 49' |
| PR | 17 | Rhodri Jones | (substituted on) 57' |
| PR | 18 | Dillon Lewis | (substituted on) 49' |
| LK | 19 | Matthew Screech | (substituted on) 49' |
| FL | 20 | Taine Basham | (substituted on) 62' |
| SH | 21 | Kieran Hardy | (substituted on) 62' |
| FH | 22 | Callum Sheedy | (substituted on) 62' |
| CE | 23 | Willis Halaholo | (substituted on) 51' |
Coach:
(New Zealand) Wayne Pivac

Player of the Match:
Rodrigo Bruni (Argentina)

Assistant referees:
Matthew Carley (England)
Karl Dickson (England)
Television match official:
Tom Foley (England)

Notes:

- Matthew Screech (Wales) made his international debut.
- Matías Moroni (Argentina) earned his 50th test cap.
- This was Argentina's first win over Wales since their 26–12 victory in 2012, the last time they won in Wales.
- Argentina win a test series for the first time since their 2-0 series win against Ireland in 2007.
- Argentina record their biggest winning margin over Wales (22-point difference), surpassing the 18-point difference set in 2006.
- This is the most points Argentina have scored against Wales when away from Argentina.

17 July 2021
19:00 GET (UTC+4)

| Georgia | Cancelled (Note: Match was called off following a number of COVID-19 positive cases within the Georgian camp.) | Scotland |

Boris Paichadze Dinamo Arena, Tbilisi
Referee: Andrew Brace (Ireland)

=== 24 July ===
24 July 2021
18:00 SAST (UTC+02)

| South Africa | 17–22 | British & Irish Lions |
| Try: de Klerk 49' m Pen: Pollard (4/5) 13', 17', 26', 30' | Report | Try: Cowan-Dickie 43' c Con: Biggar (1/1) 44'; Pen: Biggar (4/5) 19', 52', 55', 62'; Farrell (1/1) 78' |

Cape Town Stadium, Cape Town
Attendance: 0
Referee: Nic Berry (Australia)

Team details

| FB | 15 | Willie le Roux | (substituted off) 66' |
| RW | 14 | Cheslin Kolbe |
| OC | 13 | Lukhanyo Am |
| IC | 12 | Damian de Allende |
| LW | 11 | Makazole Mapimpi |
| FH | 10 | Handré Pollard | (substituted off) 70' |
| SH | 9 | Faf de Klerk | (substituted off) 73' |
| N8 | 8 | Kwagga Smith | (substituted off) 63' |
| BF | 7 | Pieter-Steph du Toit |
| OF | 6 | Siya Kolisi (c) |
| RL | 5 | Franco Mostert | (substituted off) 62' |
| LL | 4 | Eben Etzebeth |
| TP | 3 | Trevor Nyakane | (substituted off) 40' |
| HK | 2 | Bongi Mbonambi | (substituted off) 40' |
| LP | 1 | Ox Nché | (substituted off) 40' |
Replacements:
| HK | 16 | Malcolm Marx | (substituted on) 40' |
| PR | 17 | Steven Kitshoff | (substituted on) 40' |
| PR | 18 | Frans Malherbe | (substituted on) 40' |
| LK | 19 | Lood de Jager | (substituted on) 62' |
| FL | 20 | Rynhardt Elstadt | (substituted on) 63' |
| SH | 21 | Herschel Jantjies | (substituted on) 73' |
| FH | 22 | Elton Jantjies | (substituted on) 70' |
| FB | 23 | Damian Willemse | (substituted on) 66' |
Coach:
(South Africa) Jacques Nienaber

| FB | 15 | (Scotland) Stuart Hogg |
| RW | 14 | (England) Anthony Watson |
| OC | 13 | (England) Elliot Daly | (substituted off) 64' | (substituted on) 66' |
| IC | 12 | (Ireland) Robbie Henshaw |
| LW | 11 | (Scotland) Duhan van der Merwe | (substituted off) 70' |
| FH | 10 | (Wales) Dan Biggar | | (substituted off) 66' |
| SH | 9 | (Scotland) Ali Price | (substituted off) 63' |
| N8 | 8 | (Ireland) Jack Conan |
| OF | 7 | (England) Tom Curry | (substituted off) 56' |
| BF | 6 | (England) Courtney Lawes | (substituted off) 72' |
| RL | 5 | (Wales) Alun Wyn Jones (c) |
| LL | 4 | (England) Maro Itoje |
| TP | 3 | (Ireland) Tadhg Furlong | (substituted off) 66' |
| HK | 2 | (England) Luke Cowan-Dickie | (substituted off) 56' |
| LP | 1 | (Scotland) Rory Sutherland | (substituted off) 56' |
Replacements:
| HK | 16 | (Wales) Ken Owens | (substituted on) 56' |
| PR | 17 | (England) Mako Vunipola | (substituted on) 56' |
| PR | 18 | (England) Kyle Sinckler | (substituted on) 66' |
| LK | 19 | (Ireland) Tadhg Beirne | (substituted on) 72' |
| FL | 20 | (Scotland) Hamish Watson | (substituted on) 56' |
| SH | 21 | (Ireland) Conor Murray | (substituted on) 63' |
| FH | 22 | (England) Owen Farrell | (substituted on) 64' |
| FB | 23 | (Wales) Liam Williams | (substituted on) 70' |
Coach:
(New Zealand) Warren Gatland

Player of the Match:
(England) Maro Itoje (British & Irish Lions)

Assistant referees:
Ben O'Keeffe (New Zealand)
Mathieu Raynal (France)
Television match official:
Marius Jonker (South Africa) (Note: Replaced New Zealand's Brendon Pickerill for the full test series after Pickerill was unable to travel due to COVID restrictions.)

Notes:

- Wyn Jones (British & Irish Lions) was named to start but withdrew ahead of the game due to injury and was replaced by Rory Sutherland - Mako Vunipola came onto the bench.
- Tadhg Beirne, Dan Biggar, Tom Curry, Jack Conan, Luke Cowan-Dickie, Robbie Henshaw, Stuart Hogg, Ali Price, Rory Sutherland, Duhan van der Merwe and Hamish Watson all made their Lions test debuts.
- Handré Pollard (South Africa) earned his 50th test cap.

=== 31 July ===
31 July 2021
18:00 SAST (UTC+02)

| South Africa | 27–9 | British & Irish Lions |
| Try: Mapimpi 44' m Am 60' c Con: Pollard (1/2) 61'; Pen: Pollard (5/6) 3', 31', 70', 75', 80' | Report | Pen: Biggar (3/4) 9', 16', 36' |

Cape Town Stadium, Cape Town
Attendance: 0
Referee: Ben O'Keeffe (New Zealand)

Team details

| FB | 15 | Willie le Roux |
| RW | 14 | Cheslin Kolbe | (yellow card) 24' to 34' |
| OC | 13 | Lukhanyo Am |
| IC | 12 | Damian de Allende |
| LW | 11 | Makazole Mapimpi | | (substituted off) 67' |
| FH | 10 | Handré Pollard |
| SH | 9 | Faf de Klerk | | (substituted off) 63' |
| N8 | 8 | Jasper Wiese | | (substituted off) 55' |
| BF | 7 | Pieter-Steph du Toit | | (substituted off) 21' |
| OF | 6 | Siya Kolisi (c) | | (substituted off) 72' |
| RL | 5 | Franco Mostert |
| LL | 4 | Eben Etzebeth |
| TP | 3 | Frans Malherbe | | (substituted off) 55' |
| HK | 2 | Bongi Mbonambi | | (substituted off) 55' |
| LP | 1 | Steven Kitshoff | | (substituted off) 59' |
Replacements:
| HK | 16 | Malcolm Marx | | (substituted on) 55' |
| PR | 17 | Trevor Nyakane | | (substituted on) 59' |
| PR | 18 | Vincent Koch | | (substituted on) 55' |
| LK | 19 | Lood de Jager | | (substituted on) 55' |
| FL | 20 | Marco van Staden | | (substituted on) 72' |
| FL | 21 | Kwagga Smith | | (substituted on) 21' |
| SH | 22 | Herschel Jantjies | | (substituted on) 63' |
| FB | 23 | Damian Willemse | | (substituted on) 67' |
Coach:
(South Africa) Jacques Nienaber

| FB | 15 | (Scotland) Stuart Hogg |
| RW | 14 | (England) Anthony Watson |
| OC | 13 | (Scotland) Chris Harris | | (substituted off) 61' |
| IC | 12 | (Ireland) Robbie Henshaw |
| LW | 11 | (Scotland) Duhan van der Merwe | (yellow card) 22' to 32' |
| FH | 10 | (Wales) Dan Biggar | | (substituted off) 57' |
| SH | 9 | (Ireland) Conor Murray | | (substituted off) 57' |
| N8 | 8 | (Ireland) Jack Conan | | (substituted off) 59' |
| OF | 7 | (England) Tom Curry |
| BF | 6 | (England) Courtney Lawes | | (substituted off) 70' |
| RL | 5 | (Wales) Alun Wyn Jones (c) |
| LL | 4 | (England) Maro Itoje |
| TP | 3 | (Ireland) Tadhg Furlong | | (substituted off) 55' |
| HK | 2 | (England) Luke Cowan-Dickie | | (substituted off) 55' |
| LP | 1 | (England) Mako Vunipola | | (substituted off) 55' |
Replacements:
| HK | 16 | (Wales) Ken Owens | | (substituted on) 55' |
| PR | 17 | (Scotland) Rory Sutherland | | (substituted on) 55' |
| PR | 18 | (England) Kyle Sinckler | | (substituted on) 55' |
| LK | 19 | (Ireland) Tadhg Beirne | | (substituted on) 70' |
| N8 | 20 | (Wales) Taulupe Faletau | | (substituted on) 59' |
| SH | 21 | (Scotland) Ali Price | | (substituted on) 57' |
| FH | 22 | (England) Owen Farrell | | (substituted on) 57' |
| CE | 23 | (England) Elliot Daly | | (substituted on) 61' |
Coach:
(New Zealand) Warren Gatland

Player of the Match:
Makazole Mapimpi (South Africa)

Assistant referees:
Nic Berry (Australia)
Mathieu Raynal (France)
Television match official:
Marius Jonker (South Africa)

Notes:

- Steven Kitshoff (South Africa) earned his 50th test cap.
- Chris Harris (British & Irish Lions) made his Lions test debut.

=== 7 August ===
7 August 2021
19:05 NZST (UTC+12)

| New Zealand | 33–25 | Australia |
| Try: Reece 40' c Mo'unga 51' c Havili 58' m McKenzie 64' m Con: Mo'unga (2/4) 40', 52'; Pen: Mo'unga (3/3) 17', 21', 29' | Report | Try: Kellaway 36' m Banks (2) 69' m, 74' m Uelese 80' c Con: Lolesio (1/4) 80+1'; Pen: Lolesio (1/3) 31' |

Eden Park, Auckland
Attendance: 47,000
Referee: Paul Williams (New Zealand) (Note: Non-neutral match official team due to continued travel restrictions into New Zealand)

Team details

| FB | 15 | Damian McKenzie |
| RW | 14 | Sevu Reece | (substituted off) 62' |
| OC | 13 | Anton Lienert-Brown |
| IC | 12 | David Havili |
| LW | 11 | Rieko Ioane |
| FH | 10 | Richie Mo'unga | (substituted off) 66' |
| SH | 9 | Aaron Smith | (substituted off) 71' |
| N8 | 8 | Ardie Savea |
| OF | 7 | Dalton Papalii |
| BF | 6 | Akira Ioane | (substituted off) 67' |
| RL | 5 | Sam Whitelock (c) |
| LL | 4 | Brodie Retallick | (substituted off) 66' |
| TP | 3 | Nepo Laulala | (substituted off) 60' |
| HK | 2 | Codie Taylor | (substituted off) 62' |
| LP | 1 | George Bower | (substituted off) 53' |
Replacements:
| HK | 16 | Samisoni Taukei'aho | (substituted on) 62' |
| PR | 17 | Karl Tu'inukuafe | (substituted on) 53' |
| PR | 18 | Angus Ta'avao | (substituted on) 60' |
| LK | 19 | Patrick Tuipulotu | (substituted on) 66' |
| FL | 20 | Luke Jacobson | (substituted on) 67' |
| SH | 21 | Brad Weber | (substituted on) 71' |
| FH | 22 | Beauden Barrett | (substituted on) 66' |
| FB | 23 | Jordie Barrett | (substituted on) 62' |
Coach:
(New Zealand) Ian Foster

| FB | 15 | Tom Banks |
| RW | 14 | Jordan Petaia | (substituted off) 71' |
| OC | 13 | Len Ikitau |
| IC | 12 | Hunter Paisami | (substituted off) 66' |
| LW | 11 | Andrew Kellaway |
| FH | 10 | Noah Lolesio |
| SH | 9 | Tate McDermott | (substituted off) 71' |
| N8 | 8 | Harry Wilson | (substituted off) 60' |
| OF | 7 | Michael Hooper (c) |
| BF | 6 | Rob Valetini |
| RL | 5 | Lukhan Salakaia-Loto |
| LL | 4 | Darcy Swain | (substituted off) 66' |
| TP | 3 | Allan Alaalatoa | (substituted off) 53' |
| HK | 2 | Brandon Paenga-Amosa | (substituted off) 71' |
| LP | 1 | James Slipper | (substituted off) 60' |
Replacements:
| HK | 16 | Jordan Uelese | (substituted on) 71' |
| PR | 17 | Angus Bell | (substituted on) 60' |
| PR | 18 | Taniela Tupou | (substituted on) 53' |
| LK | 19 | Matt Philip | (substituted on) 66' |
| FL | 20 | Fraser McReight | (substituted on) 60' |
| SH | 21 | Jake Gordon | (substituted on) 71' |
| FH | 22 | Matt To'omua | (substituted on) 66' |
| CE | 23 | Reece Hodge | (substituted on) 71' |
Coach:
(New Zealand) Dave Rennie

Assistant referees:
Mike Fraser (New Zealand)
Brendon Pickerill (New Zealand)
Television match official:
Glenn Newman (New Zealand)

Notes:

- Scott Barrett and Dane Coles (New Zealand) were named as replacements but were injured in the warm-up and were replaced by Patrick Tuipulotu and Samisoni Taukei'aho respectively.
- Aaron Smith became the tenth All Black player to earn his 100th test cap.

7 August 2021
18:00 SAST (UTC+02)

| South Africa | 19–16 | British & Irish Lions |
| Try: Kolbe 55' c Con: Pollard (1/1) 56'; Pen: Pollard (2/4) 11', 35'; Steyn (2/2) 66', 78' | Report | Try: Owens 18' c Con: Russell (1/1) 20'; Pen: Russell (3/3) 16', 62', 74' |

Cape Town Stadium, Cape Town
Attendance: 0
Referee: Mathieu Raynal (France)

Team details

| FB | 15 | Willie le Roux | (substituted off) 68' |
| RW | 14 | Cheslin Kolbe |
| OC | 13 | Lukhanyo Am |
| IC | 12 | Damian de Allende |
| LW | 11 | Makazole Mapimpi |
| FH | 10 | Handré Pollard | (substituted off) 64' |
| SH | 9 | Cobus Reinach | (substituted off) 63' |
| N8 | 8 | Jasper Wiese | | (substituted off) 62' |
| BF | 7 | Franco Mostert | 12' to 20' |
| OF | 6 | Siya Kolisi (c) | (substituted off) 55' | (substituted on) 62' |
| RL | 5 | Lood de Jager | | | (substituted off) 52' |
| LL | 4 | Eben Etzebeth |
| TP | 3 | Frans Malherbe | (substituted off) 55' |
| HK | 2 | Bongi Mbonambi | (substituted off) 55' |
| LP | 1 | Steven Kitshoff | (substituted off) 60' |
Replacements:
| HK | 16 | Malcolm Marx | (substituted on) 55' |
| PR | 17 | Trevor Nyakane | (substituted on) 60' |
| PR | 18 | Vincent Koch | (substituted on) 55' |
| FL | 19 | Marco van Staden | (substituted on) 55' |
| FL | 20 | Kwagga Smith | (substituted on) 12' | (substituted off) 20' | (substituted on) 52' |
| SH | 21 | Herschel Jantjies | (substituted on) 63' |
| FH | 22 | Morné Steyn | (substituted on) 64' |
| FB | 23 | Damian Willemse | (substituted on) 68' |
Coach:
(South Africa) Jacques Nienaber

| FB | 15 | (Wales) Liam Williams |
| RW | 14 | (Wales) Josh Adams |
| OC | 13 | (Ireland) Robbie Henshaw |
| IC | 12 | (Ireland) Bundee Aki |
| LW | 11 | (Scotland) Duhan van der Merwe |
| FH | 10 | (Wales) Dan Biggar | (substituted off) 10' |
| SH | 9 | (Scotland) Ali Price | (substituted off) 58' |
| N8 | 8 | (Ireland) Jack Conan | (substituted off) 60' |
| OF | 7 | (England) Tom Curry |
| BF | 6 | (England) Courtney Lawes |
| RL | 5 | (Wales) Alun Wyn Jones (c) | (substituted off) 60' |
| LL | 4 | (England) Maro Itoje |
| TP | 3 | (Ireland) Tadhg Furlong | (substituted off) 58' |
| HK | 2 | (Wales) Ken Owens | (substituted off) 53' |
| LP | 1 | (Wales) Wyn Jones | (substituted off) 43' |
Replacements:
| HK | 16 | (England) Luke Cowan-Dickie | (substituted on) 53' |
| PR | 17 | (England) Mako Vunipola | (substituted on) 43' |
| PR | 18 | (England) Kyle Sinckler | (substituted on) 58' |
| LK | 19 | (Wales) Adam Beard | (substituted on) 60' |
| N8 | 20 | (England) Sam Simmonds | (substituted on) 60' |
| SH | 21 | (Ireland) Conor Murray | (substituted on) 58' |
| FH | 22 | (Scotland) Finn Russell | (substituted on) 10' |
| CE | 23 | (England) Elliot Daly |
Coach:
(New Zealand) Warren Gatland

Player of the Match:
Cheslin Kolbe (South Africa)

Assistant referees:
Ben O'Keeffe (New Zealand)
Nic Berry (Australia)
Television match official:
Marius Jonker (South Africa)

Notes:

- Damian de Allende (South Africa) earned his 50th test cap.
- Josh Adams, Bundee Aki, Adam Beard, Wyn Jones, Finn Russell and Sam Simmonds all made their Lions test debuts.

== See also ==
- 2021 end-of-year rugby union internationals
- 2023 Rugby World Cup qualifying
- 2021 Rugby Championship
