= Will Rowlands =

Wales international rugby union player

- Full name: William Michael Colin Rowlands
- Born: 19 September 1991 (age 35) Hammersmith, England
- Height: 2.03 m (6 ft 8 in)
- Weight: 123 kg (271 lb; 19 st 5 lb)
- School: Rugby School
- University: Pembroke College; University of Warwick

Rugby union career
- Position: Lock
Senior career
Years	Team	Apps	(Points)
2013–2021	Wasps	112	(45)
2015–2016	→ Jersey (loan)	11	(0)
2021–2022	Dragons	16	(0)
2023–2026	Racing 92	49	(0)
- Correct as of 28 July 2026
International career
Years	Team	Apps	(Points)
2020–2025	Wales	41	(15)
- Correct as of 28 July 2026

William Michael Colin Rowlands (born 19 September 1991) is a professional rugby union player who plays as a lock. Born in England, he represented Wales at international level after qualifying on ancestry grounds.

== Early life ==
Rowlands was born in Hammersmith. He went to the Dragon School, Oxford then Rugby School. He studied Economics & Management at Pembroke College, Oxford and then studied Business, Administration and Management at Warwick University whilst playing for Wasps Rugby.

During his time at Oxford University, Rowlands played in the Varsity Matches of 2012 and 2013.

On both occasions, Rowlands finished on the winning side with Oxford University RFC defeating their Light Blue counterparts 26-19 and 33-15, respectively.

== Club career ==
=== Wasps ===
He made his Wasps debut in the 2012/13 season's Anglo-Welsh Cup match against Leicester Tigers.

He signed a first-team contract with Wasps before the 2014/15 season, having graduated from the Wasps Academy.

Rowlands spent much of the 2015/16 season after the 2015 Rugby World Cup on loan to RFU Championship side Jersey Reds, before returning to Wasps to answer an injury crisis in the second row. He made his Aviva Premiership debut away at Saracens, and gone on to make another six first team appearances. Rowlands enjoyed more first team game time during the 2016–17 season than in any of his previous campaigns with Wasps, making 14 appearances and scoring two tries.

As his time at Wasps went on, his appearances went up from season to season, playing 20 games in the 2017–18 Premiership Rugby season, scoring one try, and 28 in the 2018-19 Premiership Rugby season, scoring two tries. His efforts earned him the Players' Player of the Season award at the Club's annual End of Season Awards.

During the COVID-19 disrupted 2019-20 Premiership Rugby season, Rowlands made 18 appearances for Wasps, scoring two further tries. In his final season for Wasps, the 2020-21 Premiership Rugby season, Rowlands played on 19 further occasion, scoring two further tries.

=== Dragons ===
On 28 January 2021, Rowlands would announce his decision to leave Wasps to join Welsh region Dragons in the Pro14 on a long-term contract from the 2021–22 season. By changing clubs, Rowlands ensured that he remained eligible to play for the Wales under the 60-cap rule which prevents players based outside of Wales from playing for the national side if they have fewer than 60 caps.

In his debut season for the Dragons, contrasting with his time at Wasps, Rowlands only played in 11 games for the club.

Ahead of the 2022–23 United Rugby Championship, Rowlands was announced as Co-Captain of Dragons RFC along with fellow forward Harrison Keddie. Speaking of Rowlands at the time, then Dragons Director of Rugby Dean Ryan said, "Will has a huge presence on the squad, but obviously also commitments with Wales, while Harrison has developed as a strong captain...I want to develop Will’s leadership skills, give him more permission to be the front voice, and Harrison has a natural ability to lead. This decision makes us stronger. Neither of them is worried about the title it carries. It increases the amount of people that we have got making decisions in the heat of the moment."

=== Racing 92 ===
On 6 December 2022, it was announced that Will Rowlands will join Top 14 side Racing 92 after being unable to reach agreement on contract terms with the Welsh Rugby Union.

== International career ==
Although born in England Rowlands is eligible to play for Wales thanks to his Welsh-born father, and received his first call up squad by coach Wayne Pivac on 15 January 2020 for the 2020 Six Nations Championship. He made his international debut for Wales on 22 February 2020 in the 27–23 defeat against France as a second-half replacement.

He was named Wales Player of the Year in 2022 by the Welsh Rugby Writers Association.

== Personal life ==
Rowlands' father Jeremy is from Pontllanfraith in the Sirhowy Valley near Caerphilly, and his family describe growing up in Oxfordshire supporting Wales.

== Career statistics ==
=== List of international tries ===
No.	Date	Venue	Opponent	Score	Result	Competition
1	3 July 2021	Millennium Stadium, Cardiff, Wales	Canada	38–5	68–12	2021 July rugby union tests
2	10 July 2021	Millennium Stadium, Cardiff, Wales	Argentina	11–20	20–20	2021 July rugby union tests

as of 10 July 2021
