= Naoto Saitō =

Japan international rugby union player

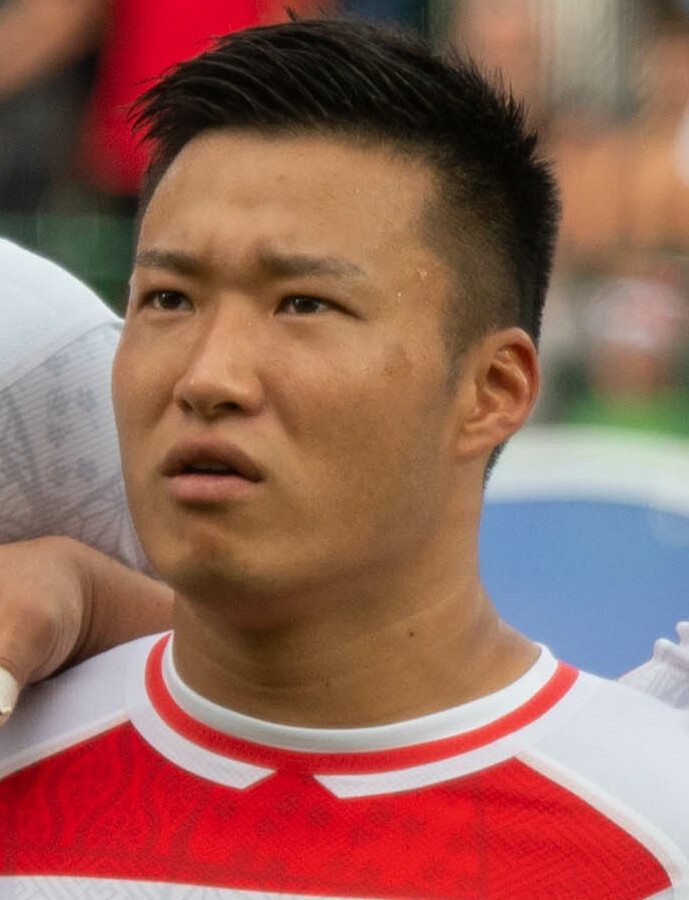
- Born: 26 August 1997 (age 29) Kanagawa, Japan
- Height: 1.65 m (5 ft 5 in)
- Weight: 75 kg (165 lb; 11 st 11 lb)

Rugby union career
- Position: Scrum-half
- Current team: Suntory Sungoliath
Senior career
Years	Team	Apps	(Points)
2020	Sunwolves	6	(0)
2021–2024 2026–	Suntory Sungoliath	59	(110)
2024–2026	Toulouse	35	(15)
- Correct as of 6 June 2026
International career
Years	Team	Apps	(Points)
2019–2023	Japan XV	4	(11)
2021–	Japan	40	(61)
- Correct as of 14 November 2026

Naoto Saitō (斉藤 直人, Saitō Naoto; born 26 August 1997) is a Japanese professional rugby union player who plays as a scrum-half for Tokyo Suntory Sungoliath in Japan Rugby League One and the Japan national team. He previously played for Toulouse in the Top 14 competition in France.

== Career statistics ==
=== List of international tries ===
As of 14 November 2022

Try	Opposing team	Location	Venue	Competition	Date	Result	Score
1	Ireland	Dublin, Ireland	Aviva Stadium	2021 July rugby union tests	3 July 2021	Loss	39 – 31
2	England	London, England	Twickenham Stadium	2022 Autumn Nations Series	12 November 2022	Loss	52 – 13
