= Matt Harmon (rugby union) =

Uniter States rugby union player (born 1995)

- Born: 4 December 1995 (age 30) Lake Forest, Illinois, U.S.
- Height: 1.80 m (5 ft 11 in)
- Weight: 115 kg (18.1 st; 254 lb)
- University: Life University

Rugby union career
- Position: Prop
Senior career
Years	Team	Apps	(Points)
2019–	New Orleans Gold	30	(0)
- Correct as of 4 July 2021
International career
Years	Team	Apps	(Points)
2021–	United States	3	(0)
- Correct as of 3 October 2021

Matt Harmon (born 4 December 1995) is a United States rugby union player, currently playing for the New Orleans Gold of Major League Rugby (MLR) and the United States national team. His preferred position is prop.

== Professional career ==
Harmon signed for Major League Rugby side New Orleans Gold for the 2021 Major League Rugby season, having also played for the side in 2019 and 2020. Harmon made his debut for United States against England during the 2021 July rugby union tests.
