= James Botham =

Welsh rugby union player (born 1998)

- Full name: James Ian Botham
- Born: 22 February 1998 (age 28) Cardiff, Wales
- Height: 1.89 m (6 ft 2 in)
- Weight: 108 kg (238 lb; 17 st 0 lb)
- School: Sedbergh School
- Notable relative(s): Liam Botham (father); Ian Botham (grandfather)

Rugby union career
- Position(s): Flanker, Number 8
- Current team: Cardiff
Senior career
Years	Team	Apps	(Points)
2016–	Cardiff	85	(90)
International career
Years	Team	Apps	(Points)
2017–2018	Wales U20	10	(15)
2017	Wales 7s	7	(10)
2020–	Wales	26	(20)
- Correct as of 14 November 2026

James Ian Botham (born 22 February 1998) is a Welsh professional rugby union player who plays as a flanker for United Rugby Championship club Cardiff and the Wales national team.

== Early life ==
The grandson of all-round cricketer Ian Botham, James was born in Cardiff while his father Liam Botham was playing for Cardiff RFC as a wing. After his father moved to Newcastle Falcons for the 2000–01 season, James was educated at Sedbergh School, a boarding school in Cumbria.

== Club career ==
=== Cardiff ===
Botham joined the Cardiff academy in 2016, and in the 2018–19 season started making appearances for the senior team, initially in the Anglo-Welsh Cup, and then debuted in the Pro14 against Connacht Rugby. Botham signed his first professional contract with Cardiff in March 2019.

Botham was selected as player of the match against the Dragons on 26 December 2020.

Botham signed a contract extension on 25 April 2024. He signed a further extension on 26 March 2026.

== International career ==
=== Wales U18 and U20 ===
Botham made his debut for Wales U18 on 25 March 2016 against Scotland under-18 at St. Helen's Rugby and Cricket Ground, Swansea, scoring a try in the 31-30 victory. Botham made his first appearance for Wales U20 in the 2017 Six Nations Under 20s Championship.

=== Wales Sevens ===
In early 2017, Botham was selected by Wales Sevens for the World Rugby Sevens Series, making his first appearance during the New Zealand leg.

=== Wales ===
On 16 November 2020, Botham was called up to the senior Wales rugby side for the Autumn Nations Cup tournament. Botham made his test debut against Georgia on 21 November 2020, starting on the blindside. He started the following two matches of the tournament, against England and Italy.

Botham was selected in the squad for the 2021 Six Nations Championship, making three appearances off the bench as Wales won the championship and Triple Crown.

Botham retained his place in the squad for the 2021 July rugby union tests, and score his first try for Wales in the win over Canada. Botham made two further appearances, starting both matches against Argentina.

Ahead of the 2021–22 season, Botham underwent shoulder surgery, which ruled him out of the 2021 end-of-year rugby union internationals. Botham was not selected for the 2022 Six Nations squad, having suffered a head injury just prior.

Botham was recalled by Wales for the 2024 Six Nations Championship, and scored a try against Scotland, but injured his knee and was ruled out of the remainder of the tournament.

In Wales final fixture of the 2024 Autumn Nations Series, Botham scored a late try in a 45-12 defeat to South Africa. Despite the result, this try would prevent Wales from sustaining their greatest margin of defeat in a home loss in an international fixture.

Botham was named in the squad for the 2026 Six Nations by Steve Tandy.

Botham was named Man of the Match during Wales' historic 35-28 win over New Zealand in the 2026 Nations Championship.

== Career statistics ==
=== List of international tries ===
No.	Date	Venue	Opponent	Score	Result	Competition
1	3 July 2021	Millennium Stadium, Cardiff, Wales	Canada	12–5	68–12	2021 July rugby union tests
2	3 February 2024	Millennium Stadium, Cardiff, Wales	Scotland	5–27	26–27	2024 Six Nations
3	23 November 2024	Millennium Stadium, Cardiff, Wales	South Africa	10-45	12-45	2024 end-of-year rugby union internationals

as of 22 October 2025
