= Siaki Vikilani =

Canada international rugby union player

- Born: Siaki Lolohea Vikilani; 7 August 2000 (age 26) Canada
- Height: 1.91 m (6 ft 3 in)
- Weight: 123 kg (271 lb; 19 st 5 lb)

Rugby union career
- Position: Flanker / Number 8
Senior career
| Years | Team | Apps | (Points) |
| 2021– | Toronto Arrows | 2 | (0) |
- Correct as of 3 July 2021
International career
| Years | Team | Apps | (Points) |
| 2019 | Canada U20s | 4 | (5) |
| 2021– | Canada | 1 | (0) |
- Correct as of 3 July 2021

Siaki Vikilani (born 7 August 2000) is a Canadian rugby union player, currently playing for the Toronto Arrows of Major League Rugby (MLR) and the Canadian national team. His preferred position is flanker or number 8.

== Professional career ==
Vikilani signed for Major League Rugby side Toronto Arrows for the 2021 Major League Rugby season. Vikilani made his debut for Canada in the 2021 July rugby union tests.
