= Jamie Blamire =

English rugby player (born 1997)

- Born: Jamie Blamire; 22 December 1997 (age 28) Seaton, Cumbria, England
- Height: 1.85 m (6 ft 1 in)
- Weight: 113 kg (249 lb; 17 st 11 lb)
- School: Stainburn School Gosforth Academy

Rugby union career
- Position: Hooker
- Current team: Leicester Tigers
Senior career
Years	Team	Apps	(Points)
2016–2025	Newcastle Falcons	131	(165)
2025–	Leicester Tigers	31	(70)
- Correct as of 1 November 2026
International career
Years	Team	Apps	(Points)
2017	England U20	5	(5)
2021–	England	7	(30)
2026	England A	1	(0)
- Correct as of 7 February 2026

Jamie Blamire (born 22 December 1997) is an English professional rugby union player who plays as a hooker for Leicester Tigers in Premiership Rugby.

== Early life ==
Blamire was born in Seaton, Cumbria to parents Graeme, a conservatory builder and Julie Tinnion. He has a younger sister called Gemma. He started his rugby career as part of Seaton Rangers RLFC.

== Club career ==
Blamire came through the Newcastle Academy to sign a first-team deal, and subsequent extensions. In May 2019 he scored a try on his Premiership debut against Gloucester. He is seen as an unusually attacking force for his position.

On 9 May 2025, it was confirmed that Blamire would leave Newcastle to join Premiership rivals Leicester Tigers on a long term deal ahead of the 2025-26 season.

== International career ==
Blamire scored a try for the England U20 team against Italy during the 2017 Six Nations Under 20s Championship and also featured in the final game against Ireland as England completed the grand slam. He was also a member of the squad that finished runners up to New Zealand at the 2017 World Rugby Under 20 Championship. In June 2021 he was selected by Eddie Jones for the senior England team and on 4 July 2021 scored a try on his debut against the United States at Twickenham. The following weekend saw him score a hat-trick of tries on his first start in a victory against Canada.

=== International tries ===
As of 14 November 2021

Try	Opposing team	Location	Venue	Competition	Date	Result	Score
1	United States	London, England	Twickenham Stadium	2021 July rugby union tests	4 July 2021	Win	43 – 29
2	Canada	London, England	Twickenham Stadium	2021 July rugby union tests	20 July 2021	Win	70 – 14
3	Canada	London, England	Twickenham Stadium	2021 July rugby union tests	20 July 2021	Win	70 – 14
4	Canada	London, England	Twickenham Stadium	2021 July rugby union tests	20 July 2021	Win	70 – 14
5	Tonga	London, England	Twickenham Stadium	2021 Autumn Nations Series	6 November 2021	Win	69 – 3
6	Australia	London, England	Twickenham Stadium	2021 Autumn Nations Series	13 November 2021	Win	32 – 15
