= Ross Braude =

Canadian rugby union player

- Born: 18 January 2000 (age 26) Pretoria, South Africa
- Height: 1.68 m (5 ft 6 in)
- Weight: 82 kg (12.9 st; 181 lb)

Rugby union career
- Position: Scrum-half
Amateur team(s)
Years	Team	Apps	(Points)
- Blue Bulls
Senior career
Years	Team	Apps	(Points)
2021– 2023	Toronto Arrows	36	(52)
2025–	Sharks	4	(5)
- Correct as of 8 December 2025
International career
Years	Team	Apps	(Points)
2021–2023	Canada	14	(25)
- Correct as of 3 December 2025

Ross Braude (born 18 January 2000) is a Canadian rugby union player, currently playing for the Sharks of United Rugby Championship and the Canadian national team. His preferred position is scrum-half.

== Professional career ==
Braude signed for Major League Rugby side Toronto Arrows for the 2021 Major League Rugby season. Braude made his debut for Canada in the 2021 July rugby union tests.

Braude joined the Sharks for the 2025–26 United Rugby Championship.

In early 2026, he spoke of his desire to represent South Africa upon becoming eligible to switch representation later in the year.
