= Liam Murray =

Canadian rugby union player

- Born: 17 October 1997 (age 29) Canada
- Height: 1.86 m (6 ft 1 in)
- Weight: 118 kg (18.6 st; 260 lb)

Rugby union career
- Position: Prop
Senior career
Years	Team	Apps	(Points)
2021	Houston SaberCats	4	(0)
2021	→ Toronto Arrows (loan)	1	(0)
2022-	Dallas Jackals	0	(0)
- Correct as of 5 February 2022
International career
Years	Team	Apps	(Points)
2017	Canada U20	4	(0)
2017	Canada A	1	(0)
2021–	Canada	1	(0)
- Correct as of 5 February 2022

Liam Murray (born 17 October 1997) is a Canadian rugby union player, currently playing for the Dallas Jackals of Major League Rugby (MLR) and the Canadian national team. His preferred position is prop.

== Professional career ==
Murray signed for Major League Rugby side Houston SaberCats for the 2021 Major League Rugby season. Murray made his debut for Canada in the 2021 July rugby union tests.

== Career statistics ==
As of 5 February 2022

Season	Team	Games	Starts	Sub	Tries	Cons	Pens	Drops	Points	Yel	Red
MLR 2021	Houston SaberCats	4	1	3	0	0	0	0	0	0	0
MLR 2021	Toronto Arrows	1	0	1	0	0	0	0	0	0	0
MLR 2022	Dallas Jackals	0	0	0	0	0	0	0	0	0	0
Total		5	1	4	0	0	0	0	0	0	0
