= Liam Botham =

English rugby league & union footballer, and cricketer

Personal information
- Full name: Liam James Botham
- Born: 26 August 1977 (age 49) Doncaster, South Yorkshire, England
- Height: 6 ft 0 in (1.83 m)
- Weight: 15 st 0 lb (95 kg)

Playing information

Rugby union
- Position: Wing
Club
Years	Team	Pld	T	G	FG	P
1996–1997	West Hartlepool	14				15
1997–2000	Cardiff RFC	29				120
2000–2003	Newcastle Falcons	74				111
2003–2004	Leeds Tykes	19				10
	Total	136	0	0	0	256
Representative
Years	Team	Pld	T	G	FG	P
1997–1998	England U21

Rugby league
- Position: Second-row
Club
Years	Team	Pld	T	G	FG	P
2003–05	Leeds Rhinos	15	4	0	0	16
2004(loan)	→ London Broncos	8	3	7	0	26
2005	Wigan Warriors	5	0	0	0	0
	Total	28	7	7	0	42
- Cricket career

Personal information
- Batting: Right-handed
- Bowling: Right-arm medium-fast
- Relatives: Ian Botham (father); James Botham (son)

Domestic team information
- Years: Team
- 1996: Hampshire

Career statistics
Competition	FC	LA
Matches	3	1
Runs scored	31	1
Batting average	10.33	1.00
100s/50s	0/0	0/0
Top score	30	1
Balls bowled	330	24
Wickets	8	0
Bowling average	33.50	–
5 wickets in innings	1	–
10 wickets in match	0	–
Best bowling	5/67	–
Catches/stumpings	2/–	0/–
- Source: ESPNcricinfo, 7 July 2021

Liam James Botham (born 26 August 1977) is an English former professional sportsman who played both codes of rugby football and cricket. He is the son of former England cricketer Ian Botham.

== Career ==
=== Cricket ===
Botham was born in Doncaster and initially followed in his father's footsteps, playing county cricket for Hampshire. He played three matches in the 1996 season. He took the wicket of former England captain Mike Gatting on his County Championship debut.

After retiring from rugby, there were signs that Botham might return to playing competitive cricket; in 2006, he played in an England XI victory against Lancashire in a testimonial match for Andrew Flintoff at Old Trafford.

=== Rugby union ===
Botham left cricket in 1997 after one senior season and signed for rugby union club West Hartlepool, where he played as a wing or fullback. He later moved to Cardiff and Newcastle Falcons.

While at Newcastle the club won the 2001 Tetley Bitter Cup, in the final of which he was a replacement, and reached the final of the European Shield.

Botham made his début for the England under-21 team in 1997 against France, and then played in the SANZAR tournament in South Africa in 1998. He was called up to the senior England squad by Clive Woodward for their 2000 tour of South Africa. He played in tour matches against the Leopards and Griqualand West but never won a senior international cap.

=== Rugby league ===
After becoming disillusioned with rugby union, he switched sports again in 2003 to rugby league. He initially joined the Bradford Bulls and had a short spell playing for their academy team. He then signed a dual-code contract with Super League club Leeds Rhinos, who felt that signing the inexperienced Botham was less of a risk as he also played for their partner rugby union club Leeds Tykes.

In 2004, Botham also played for London Broncos on loan, and in 2005 signed for Wigan Warriors, feeling he could not get a regular place in the Rhinos team. In his three seasons in rugby league, usually as a second-row, he played 28 senior games, scoring 7 tries and 6 goals.

In 2005, Botham announced his retirement aged 27 after a neck injury.

== Post-playing career ==
Since retiring, Botham has run a sports travel company.

== Personal life ==
Botham married Sarah-Jayne, with whom he has three children. Their son James plays rugby union for Cardiff Blues and made his full international debut for Wales in 2020.

The couple later divorced and Botham married Lisa Harrison in 2013. She gave birth to their son Benji in July 2015.
