= Enzo Forletta =

France international rugby union player

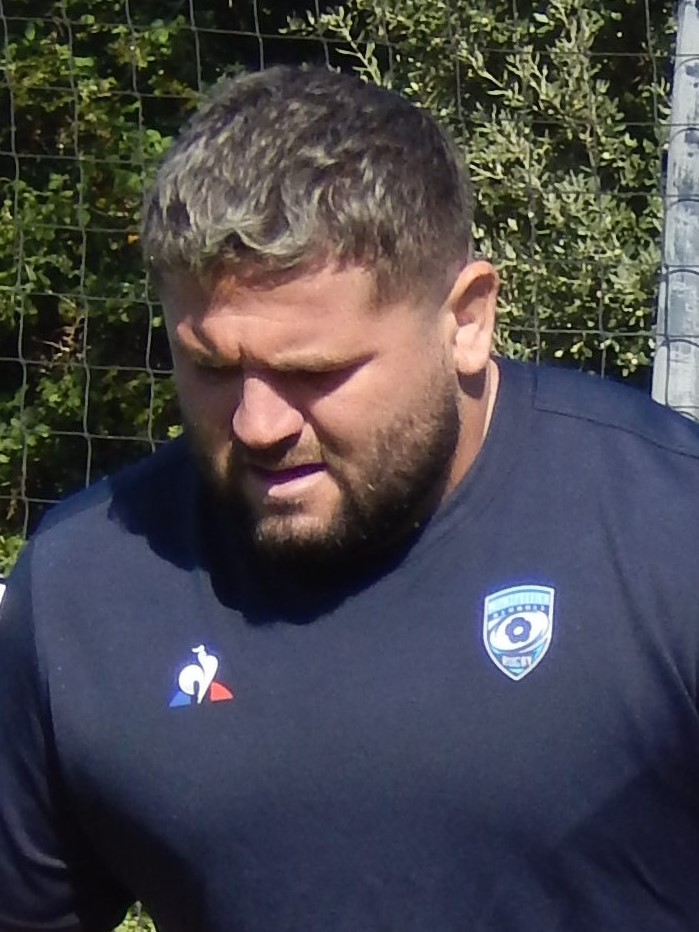
- Born: 15 June 1994 (age 32) Perpignan, France
- Height: 175 cm (5 ft 9 in)
- Weight: 120 kg (265 lb; 18 st 13 lb)

Rugby union career
- Position: Prop
- Current team: Montpellier
Senior career
Years	Team	Apps	(Points)
2014–2020	Perpignan	142	(35)
2020–	Montpellier	49	(5)
- Correct as of 7 May 2022
International career
Years	Team	Apps	(Points)
2021–	France	2	(0)
- Correct as of 31 October 2021

Enzo Forletta (born 15 June 1994) is a French rugby union player who plays for Montpellier in the Top 14. His playing position is prop. Forletta signed for Montpellier in 2020, following four seasons at Perpignan. He made his debut for France in the 2021 July rugby union tests against Australia.
