= Kouki Arai =

Japanese rugby union player

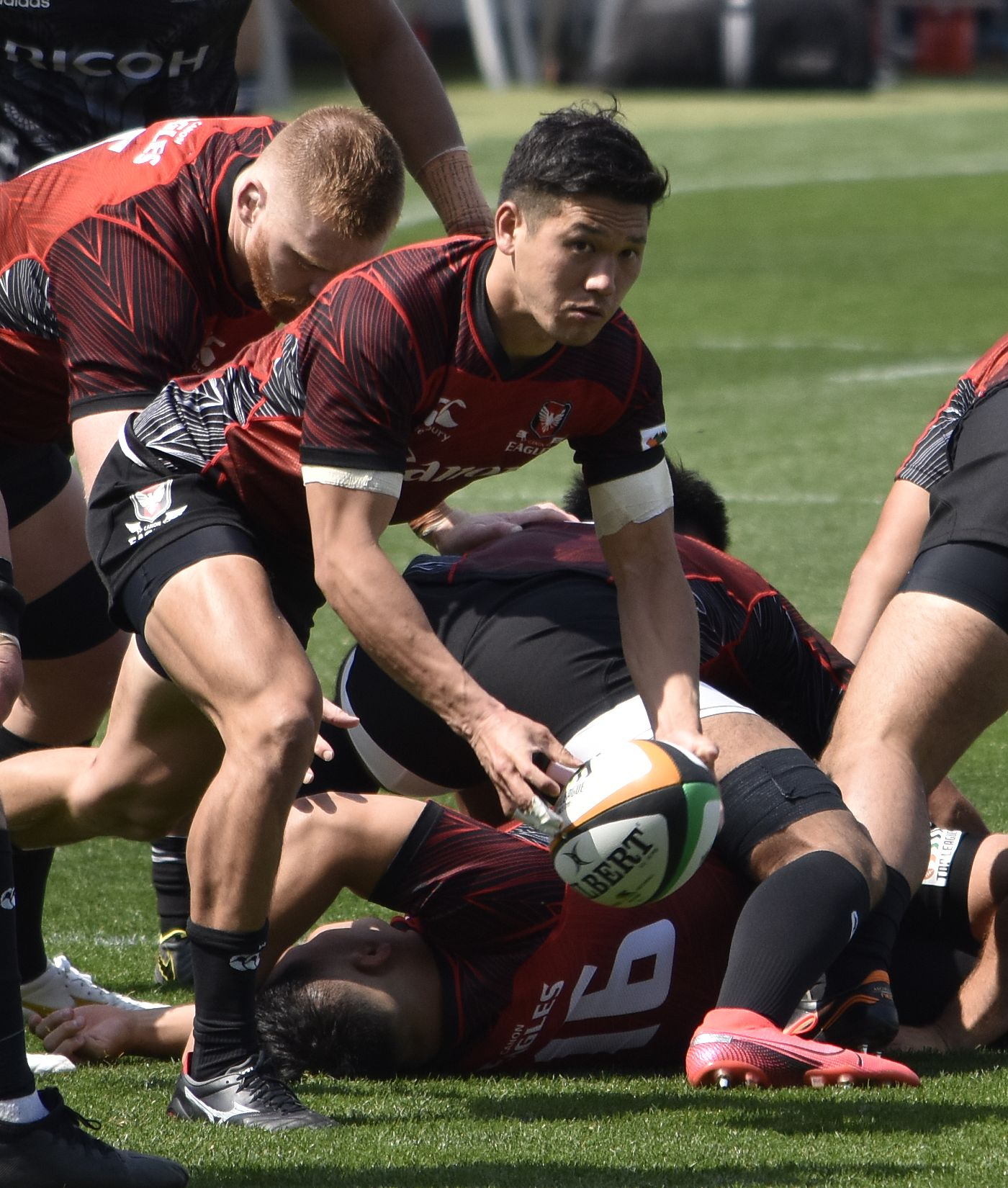
- Full name: Kouki Arai
- Born: 14 May 1993 (age 33) Japan
- Height: 1.74 m (5 ft 9 in)
- Weight: 78 kg (12 st 4 lb; 172 lb)

Rugby union career
- Position: Scrum-half
- Current team: Canon Eagles
Senior career
Years	Team	Apps	(Points)
2016–present	Canon Eagles	62	(25)
2018	Sunwolves	0	(0)
- Correct as of 20 February 2021

Kouki Arai (新井康植, Arai Kōki; born 14 May 1993) is a Japanese rugby union player who plays as a scrum-half. He currently plays for the Canon Eagles in Japan's domestic Top League.
