= William Percillier =

Canada international rugby union player

Will Percillier
- Born: William McDougall-Percillier; 30 January 1999 (age 27) Bordeaux, France
- Height: 1.80 m (5 ft 11 in)
- Weight: 80 kg (176 lb)
- University: University of British Columbia

Rugby union career
- Position: Scrum-Half
Senior career
Years	Team	Apps	(Points)
2020-	Stade Français	16	(5)
2022-	→ RC Vannes	0	(0)
- Correct as of 6 June 2021
International career
Years	Team	Apps	(Points)
2017-19	Canada U20	7	(0)
2019-	Canada	2	(0)
- Correct as of 6 June 2021

William Percillier (born 30 January 1999) is a Canadian rugby union player. His usual position is as a scrum-half, and he currently plays for Stade Français in the Top 14.

== Club statistics ==
As of 9 April 2022

Competition	Season	Team	Games	Starts	Sub	Tries	Cons	Pens	Drops	Points	Yel	Red
Challenge Cup	2019-20	Stade Français Paris	2	0	2	0	0	0	0	0	0	0
Top 14	2020-21	Stade Français Paris	4	0	4	1	0	0	0	5	0	0
Challenge Cup	2020-21	Stade Français Paris	1	1	0	0	0	0	0	0	0	0
Top 14	2021-22	Stade Français Paris	6	1	5	0	0	0	0	0	0	0
Challenge Cup	2021-22	Stade Français Paris	3	1	0	0	0	0	0	0	0	0
Total			16	3	13	1	0	0	0	5	0	0
