= Kosuke Horikoshi =

Japan international rugby union player

- Born: 2 June 1995 (age 31) Gunma, Japan
- Height: 1.75 m (5 ft 9 in)
- Weight: 100 kg (220 lb; 15 st 10 lb)

Rugby union career
- Position: Hooker
- Current team: Suntory Sungoliath
Senior career
Years	Team	Apps	(Points)
2018–	Suntory Sungoliath	92	(140)
- Correct as of 28 August 2023
International career
Years	Team	Apps	(Points)
2014–2015	Japan U20	9	(5)
2015–2023	Japan XV	7	(10)
2018–2023	Japan	7	(5)
- Correct as of 28 August 2023

Kosuke Horikoshi (堀越 康介, Horikoshi Kosuke; born 2 June 1995) is a Japanese professional rugby union player who plays as a hooker for Japan Rugby League One club Tokyo Sungoliath and the Japan national team.

== International career ==
Japan head coach Jamie Joseph has named Kosuke Horikoshi in a 52-man training squad ahead of British and Irish Lions test.
