= Siosaia Fifita =

Japanese rugby union player

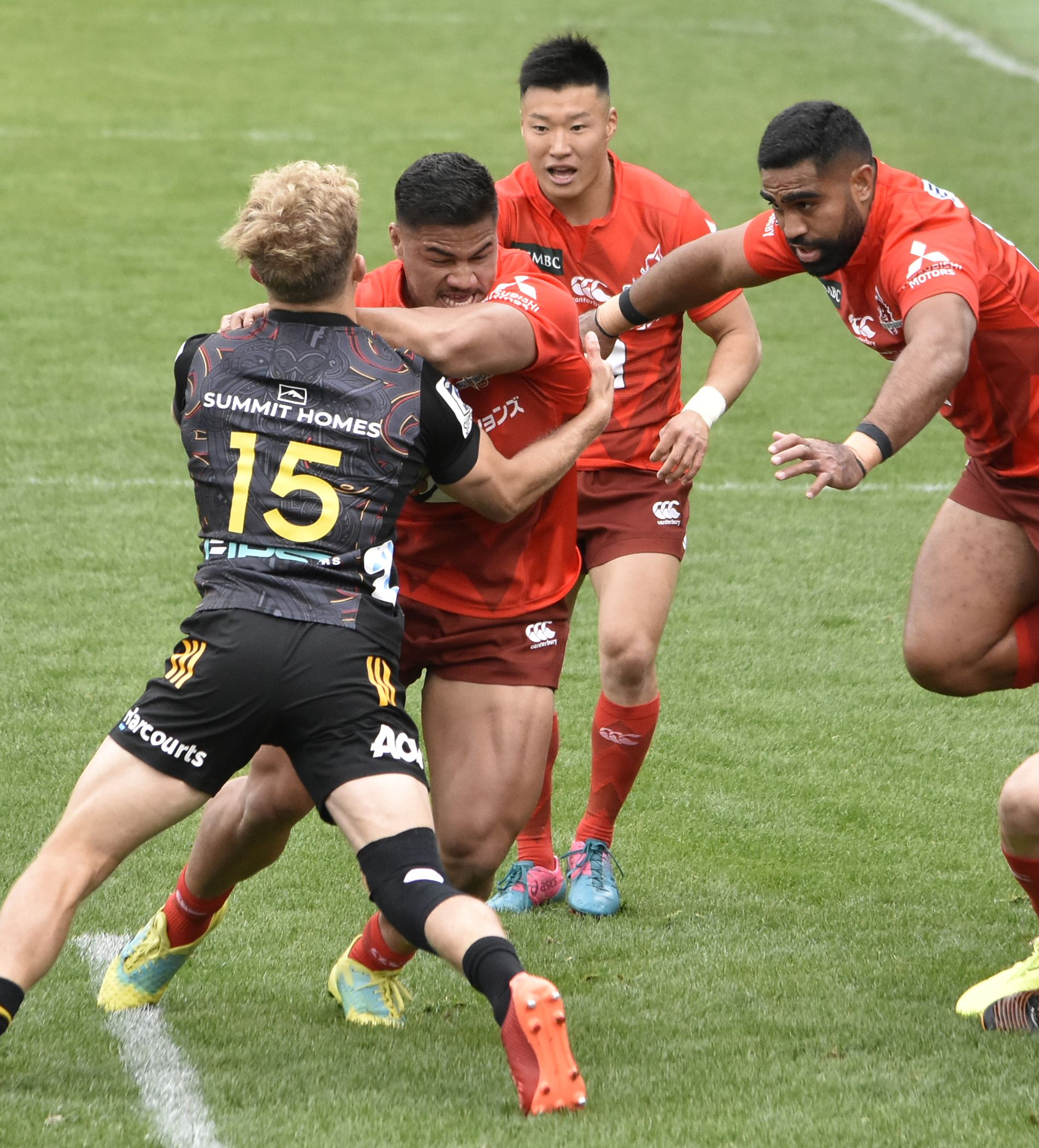
- Fifita representing the Sunwolves during Super Rugby
- Full name: Siosaia Ofa Ki Vahanoa Fifita
- Born: 20 December 1998 (age 27) Nukuʻalofa, Tonga
- Height: 1.87 m (6 ft 2 in)
- Weight: 110 kg (243 lb; 17 st 5 lb)
- University: Tenri University

Rugby union career
- Position(s): Wing, Centre
- Current team: Toyota Verblitz
Senior career
Years	Team	Apps	(Points)
2020	Sunwolves	6	(10)
2021–2023	Kintetsu Liners	24	(75)
2023–	Toyota Verblitz	51	(75)
- Correct as of 28 August 2023
International career
Years	Team	Apps	(Points)
2018–2019	Junior Japan	6	(10)
2018	Japan U20	5	(10)
2021–	Japan	16	(25)
- Correct as of 28 August 2023

Siosaia Ofa Ki Vahanoa Fifita (シオサイア フィフィタ, Shiosaia Fifita; born 20 December 1998) is a professional rugby union player who plays as a wing for Japan Rugby League One club Kintetsu Liners. Born in Tonga, he represents Japan at international level after qualifying on residency grounds.
