= 2022 end-of-year rugby union internationals =

Rugby matches

The 2022 end of year rugby union tests, also known as the 2022 Autumn internationals, were a number of rugby union test matches played during the months of October and November. Some of the games were known as the Autumn Nations Series for marketing purposes. Also involved in matches were some second-tier teams. These international games count towards World Rugby's ranking system, with a team typically playing from two to four matches during this period.

== Fixtures ==
=== 29 October ===
29 October 2022
14:50 JST (UTC+9)

Japan	31–38	New Zealand
Try: Yamasawa 35' c Nagare 39' c Dearns 55' c Himeno 77' c Con: Yamasawa (2/2) 36', 40'; Lee (2/2) 56', 77'; Pen: Yamasawa (1/1) 18'	Report	Try: Retallick 10' c Ennor 24' c Reece 31' c Clarke 41' c Sotutu 59' c Con: Mo'unga (5/5) 11', 26', 33', 42', 60'; Pen: Mo'unga (1/1) 80+1'

National Stadium, Tokyo
Attendance: 65,188
Referee: Nika Amashukeli (Georgia)

Team details

FB	15	Ryohei Yamanaka
RW	14	Kotaro Matsushima
OC	13	Dylan Riley
IC	12	Ryoto Nakamura
LW	11	Siosaia Fifita	(substituted off) 56'
FH	10	Takuya Yamasawa	(substituted off) 48'
SH	9	Yutaka Nagare	(substituted off) 61'
N8	8	Tevita Tatafu	(substituted off) 48'
OF	7	Kazuki Himeno
BF	6	Michael Leitch	(substituted off) 61'
RL	5	Jack Cornelsen
LL	4	Warner Dearns
TP	3	Koo Ji-won	(substituted off) 70'
HK	2	Atsushi Sakate (c)
LP	1	Keita Inagaki	(substituted off) 46'
Replacements:
HK	16	Takeshi Hino
PR	17	Craig Millar	(substituted on) 46'
PR	18	Syuhei Takeuchi	(substituted on) 70'
FL	19	Kenji Shimokawa	(substituted on) 61'
FL	20	Faulua Makisi	(substituted on) 48'
SH	21	Naoto Saito	(substituted on) 61'
FH	22	Lee Seung-sin	(substituted on) 48'
WG	23	Gerhard van den Heever	(substituted on) 56'
Coach:
(New Zealand) Jamie Joseph

FB	15	Stephen Perofeta
RW	14	Sevu Reece
OC	13	Braydon Ennor		(substituted off) 63'
IC	12	Roger Tuivasa-Sheck		(substituted off) 68'
LW	11	Caleb Clarke
FH	10	Richie Mo'unga
SH	9	Finlay Christie		(substituted off) 61'
N8	8	Hoskins Sotutu		(substituted off) 65'
OF	7	Sam Cane (c)
BF	6	Shannon Frizell		(substituted off) 62'
RL	5	Tupou Vaa'i
LL	4	Brodie Retallick	(red card) 64'
TP	3	Nepo Laulala		(substituted off) 54'
HK	2	Samisoni Taukei'aho		(substituted off) 54'
LP	1	George Bower		(substituted off) 54'
Replacements:
HK	16	Codie Taylor		(substituted on) 54'
PR	17	Ofa Tu'ungafasi		(substituted on) 54'
PR	18	Tyrel Lomax		(substituted on) 54'
LK	19	Patrick Tuipulotu		(substituted on) 62'
FL	20	Dalton Papalii		(substituted on) 65'
SH	21	Aaron Smith		(substituted on) 61'
CE	22	David Havili		(substituted on) 68'
CE	23	Anton Lienert-Brown		(substituted on) 63'
Coach:
(New Zealand) Ian Foster

Assistant referees:
Jordan Way (Australia)
Graham Cooper (Australia)
Television match official:
Marius Jonker (South Africa)

Notes:

- Syuhei Takeuchi and Kenji Shimokawa (both Japan) made their international debuts.

29 October 2022
17:30 GMT (UTC+0)

Scotland	15–16	Australia
Try: Smith 10' m Kinghorn 42' c Con: Kinghorn (1/2) 43'; Pen: Kinghorn (1/2) 53'	Report	Try: Slipper 60' c Con: Foley (1/1) 62'; Pen: Foley (3/3) 15', 40+1', 70'

Murrayfield Stadium, Edinburgh
Attendance: 65,286
Referee: Luke Pearce (England)

Team details

FB	15	Ollie Smith
RW	14	Darcy Graham		(substituted off) 74'
OC	13	Mark Bennett
IC	12	Sione Tuipulotu
LW	11	Duhan van der Merwe
FH	10	Blair Kinghorn
SH	9	Ali Price		(substituted off) 66'
N8	8	Matt Fagerson		(substituted off) 59'
OF	7	Hamish Watson
BF	6	Jamie Ritchie (c)
RL	5	Grant Gilchrist
LL	4	Sam Skinner		(substituted off) 23'
TP	3	Zander Fagerson		(substituted off) 59'
HK	2	Dave Cherry		(substituted off) 59'
LP	1	Pierre Schoeman		(substituted off) 59'
Replacements:
HK	16	George Turner		(substituted on) 59'
PR	17	Jamie Bhatti		(substituted on) 59'
PR	18	WP Nel		(substituted on) 59'
LK	19	Glen Young	(yellow card) 55' to 65'	(substituted on) 23'
N8	20	Jack Dempsey		(substituted on) 59'
SH	21	George Horne		(substituted on) 66'
FH	22	Ross Thompson
WG	23	Damien Hoyland		(substituted on) 74'
Coach:
(Scotland) Gregor Townsend

FB	15	Tom Banks	(substituted off) 66'
RW	14	Andrew Kellaway
OC	13	Len Ikitau
IC	12	Hunter Paisami
LW	11	Tom Wright
FH	10	Bernard Foley	(substituted off) 74'
SH	9	Tate McDermott	(substituted off) 56'
N8	8	Rob Valetini	(substituted off) 74'
OF	7	Michael Hooper
BF	6	Jed Holloway
RL	5	Cadeyrn Neville	(substituted off) 62'
LL	4	Nick Frost
TP	3	Allan Alaalatoa	(substituted off) 40'
HK	2	Dave Porecki	(substituted off) 57'
LP	1	James Slipper (c)	(substituted off) 66'
Replacements:
HK	16	Folau Fainga'a	(substituted on) 57'
PR	17	Matt Gibbon	(substituted on) 66'
PR	18	Taniela Tupou	(substituted on) 40'
LK	19	Ned Hanigan	(substituted on) 62'
FL	20	Langi Gleeson	(substituted on) 74'
SH	21	Nic White	(substituted on) 56'
FH	22	Noah Lolesio	(substituted on) 74'
FB	23	Jock Campbell	(substituted on) 66'
Coach:
(New Zealand) Dave Rennie

Player of the Match:
James Slipper (Australia)

Assistant referees:
Karl Dickson (England)
Christophe Ridley (England)
Television match official:
Stuart Terheege (England)

Notes:

- Jack Dempsey (Scotland), Jock Campbell and Langi Gleeson (both Australia) made their international debuts.
- Australia recorded their first test victory over Scotland since November 2016, following three consecutive wins for the Scots, thus reclaiming the Hopetoun Cup.

=== 4/5/6 November ===
4 November 2022
19:45 WET (UTC+0)

Ireland A	19–47	All Blacks XV
Try: Frawley 36' c Moore 57' m Deegan 76' c Con: Frawley (1/1) 37'; Crowley (1/2) 77'	Report	Try: Stevenson (2) 10' c, 25' m McAlister 20' c Love 41' c Ennor 53' c Lam 60' c McKenzie 72' c Con: McKenzie (6/7) 12', 21', 42', 54', 61', 73'

RDS Arena, Dublin
Referee: Matthew Carley (England)

5 November 2022
13:00 EET (UTC+2)

Romania	30–23	Chile
Try: Septar 9' c Simionescu 25' c Cojocaru 72' c Con: Boldor (2/2) 11', 26'; Popa (1/1) 73'; Pen: Boldor (1/2) 17'; Popa (2/3) 35', 62'	Report	Try: Saavedra 31' m Böhme 49' m M. Garafulic 66' c Con: Videla (1/3) 67'; Pen: Videla (2/3) 60', 76'

Stadionul Arcul de Triumf, Bucharest
Attendance: 4,000
Referee: Sam Grove-White (Scotland)

Team details

FB	15	Hinckley Vaovasa
RW	14	Marius Simionescu
OC	13	Alexandru Bucur
IC	12	Vlăduț Popa
LW	11	Atila Septar	(substituted off) 63'
FH	10	Tudor Boldor	(substituted off) 34'
SH	9	Gabriel Rupanu	(substituted off) 50'
N8	8	Damian Strătilă
OF	7	Cristi Chirică	(substituted off) 50'
BF	6	Mihai Macovei (c)
RL	5	Johannes van Heerden
LL	4	Florian Roșu	(substituted off) 47'
TP	3	Alexandru Gordaș	(substituted off) 48'
HK	2	Tudor Butnariu	(substituted off) 48'
LP	1	Vasile Balan	(substituted off) 48'	(substituted on) 77'
Replacements:
HK	16	Ovidiu Cojocaru	(substituted on) 48'
PR	17	Alexandru Savin	(substituted on) 48'	(substituted off) 77'
PR	18	Victor Leon	(substituted on) 48'
LK	19	Marius Iftimiciuc	(substituted on) 47'
FL	20	Kamil Sobota	(substituted on) 50'
SH	21	Florin Surugiu	(substituted on) 50'
WG	22	Nicolas Onuțu	(substituted on) 34'
FB	23	Robert Neagu	(substituted on) 63'
Coach:
(England) Andy Robinson

FB	15	Santiago Videla
RW	14	Nicolas Garafulic
OC	13	Matías Garafulic	(yellow card) 34' to 44'
IC	12	Iñaki Ayarza		(substituted off) 79'
LW	11	Pablo Casas	(yellow card) 23' to 33'
FH	10	Rodrigo Fernández
SH	9	Marcelo Torrealba		(substituted off) 56'
N8	8	Alfonso Escobar		(substituted off) 42'
OF	7	Ignacio Silva		(substituted off) 63'
BF	6	Martín Sigren (c)
RL	5	Javier Eissmann		(substituted off) 67'
LL	4	Clemente Saavedra
TP	3	Matías Dittus		(substituted off) 44'
HK	2	Tomás Dussaillant		(substituted off) 44'
LP	1	Salvador Lues		(substituted off) 44'
Replacements:
HK	16	Augusto Böhme		(substituted on) 44'
PR	17	Javier Carrasco		(substituted on) 44'
PR	18	Iñaki Gurruchaga		(substituted on) 44'
LK	19	Santiago Pedrero		(substituted on) 67'
FL	20	Joaquín Milesi		(substituted on) 63'
SH	21	Lukas Carvallo		(substituted on) 56'
CE	22	José Larenas		(substituted on) 79'
FL	23	Raimundo Martínez		(substituted on) 42'
Coach:
(Uruguay) Pablo Lemoine

Assistant referees:
Ben Blain (Scotland)
Peter Martin (Ireland)
Television match official:
Marius van der Westhuizen (South Africa)

Notes:

- Atila Septar (Romania) and Joaquín Milesi (Chile) made their international debuts.

5 November 2022
14:00 CET (UTC+1)

Italy	49–17	Samoa
Try: Brex 21' c Bruno (2) 23' c, 60' c Ioane (2) 40' m, 44' c Cannone 54' c Con: Allan (3/4) 22', 24', 46'; Garbisi (2/2) 55', 61'; Pen: Allan (2/2) 10', 28'; Garbisi (1/1) 37'	Report	Try: Seuteni 51' c Paia'aua 71' m McFarland 79' m Con: Leuila (1/3) 52'

Stadio Plebiscito, Padua
Attendance: 8,457
Referee: Christophe Ridley (England)

Team details

FB	15	Tommaso Allan	(substituted off) 40'	(substituted on) 50'
RW	14	Pierre Bruno
OC	13	Ignacio Brex
IC	12	Luca Morisi	(substituted off) 50'
LW	11	Monty Ioane
FH	10	Paolo Garbisi
SH	9	Stephen Varney	(substituted off) 64'
N8	8	Lorenzo Cannone
OF	7	Michele Lamaro (c)
BF	6	Manuel Zuliani	(substituted off) 40'
RL	5	Federico Ruzza
LL	4	David Sisi	(substituted off) 50'
TP	3	Simone Ferrari	(substituted off) 64'
HK	2	Giacomo Nicotera	(substituted off) 50'
LP	1	Danilo Fischetti	(substituted off) 55'
Replacements:
HK	16	Gianmarco Lucchesi	(substituted on) 50'
PR	17	Ivan Nemer	(substituted on) 55'
PR	18	Pietro Ceccarelli	(substituted on) 64'
LK	19	Niccolò Cannone	(substituted on) 50'
N8	20	Toa Halafihi	(substituted on) 40'
SH	21	Manfredi Albanese	(substituted on) 64'
CE	22	Enrico Lucchin	(substituted on) 50'
WG	23	Tommaso Menoncello	(substituted on) 40'	(substituted off) 50'
Coach:
(New Zealand) Kieran Crowley

FB	15	Danny Toala	(substituted off) 61'
RW	14	Alapati Leiua
OC	13	UJ Seuteni
IC	12	D'Angelo Leuila
LW	11	Nigel Ah Wong
FH	10	Rodney Iona	(substituted off) 46'
SH	9	Ereatara Enari	(substituted off) 52'
N8	8	Fritz Lee
OF	7	Jordan Taufua	(substituted off) 57'
BF	6	Theo McFarland
RL	5	Chris Vui
LL	4	Brian Alainu'uese	(substituted off) 46'
TP	3	Michael Alaalatoa (c)	(substituted off) 55'
HK	2	Seilala Lam	(substituted off) 55'
LP	1	Jordan Lay	(substituted off) 55'
Replacements:
HK	16	Manu Leiataua	(substituted on) 55'
PR	17	Nephi Leatigaga	(substituted on) 55'
PR	18	Jeffery Toomaga-Allen	(substituted on) 55'
FL	19	Taleni Seu	(substituted on) 46'
FL	20	Tala Gray	(substituted on) 57'
SH	21	Jonathan Taumateine	(substituted on) 52'
CE	22	Duncan Paia'aua	(substituted on) 46'
FB	23	Tomasi Alosio	(substituted on) 61'
Coach:
(Samoa) Seilala Mapusua

Player of the Match:
Stephen Varney (Italy)

Assistant referees:
Luke Pearce (England)
Katlil Harrison (United States)
Television match official:
Brendon Pickerill (New Zealand)

Notes:

- Lorenzo Cannone, Enrico Lucchin (both Italy), Brian Alainu'uese, Tala Gray, Duncan Paia'aua, Taleni Seu and Jeffery Toomaga-Allen (all Samoa) made their international debuts.
- Italy recorded their biggest ever victory over Samoa.

5 November 2022
13:00 GMT (UTC+0)

Scotland	28–12	Fiji
Try: Turner 7' c Hastings 39' c Van der Merwe 49' c B. White 74' c Con: Hastings (2/2) 8', 41'; Kinghorn (2/2) 51', 74'	Report	Try: Tuicuvu 14' m Rotuisolia 23' c Con: Botitu (1/1) 24'

Murrayfield Stadium, Edinburgh
Attendance: 58,046
Referee: Nic Berry (Australia)

Team details

FB	15	Stuart Hogg	(yellow card) 23' to 33'
RW	14	Darcy Graham	(yellow card) 79' to end'
OC	13	Chris Harris		(substituted off) 69'
IC	12	Cameron Redpath
LW	11	Duhan van der Merwe
FH	10	Adam Hastings		(substituted off) 43'
SH	9	Ali Price		(substituted off) 52'
N8	8	Matt Fagerson
OF	7	Hamish Watson		(substituted off) 52'
BF	6	Jamie Ritchie (c)
RL	5	Grant Gilchrist		(substituted off) 61'
LL	4	Richie Gray
TP	3	Zander Fagerson		(substituted off) 69'
HK	2	George Turner		(substituted off) 32'
LP	1	Pierre Schoeman		(substituted off) 52'
Replacements:
HK	16	Ewan Ashman		(substituted on) 32'
PR	17	Rory Sutherland		(substituted on) 52'
PR	18	Murphy Walker		(substituted on) 69'
LK	19	Jonny Gray		(substituted on) 61'
N8	20	Jack Dempsey		(substituted on) 52'
SH	21	Ben White		(substituted on) 52'
FH	22	Blair Kinghorn		(substituted on) 43'
CE	23	Sione Tuipulotu		(substituted on) 69'
Coach:
(Scotland) Gregor Townsend

FB	15	Kini Murimurivalu		(substituted off) 37'
RW	14	Seta Tuicuvu
OC	13	Waisea Nayacalevu (c)
IC	12	Kalaveti Ravouvou		(substituted off) 57'
LW	11	Vinaya Habosi	(yellow card) 61' to 71'
FH	10	Vilimoni Botitu
SH	9	Frank Lomani		(substituted off) 65'
N8	8	Viliame Mata
OF	7	Levani Botia		(substituted off) 73'
BF	6	Albert Tuisue			(substituted off) 73'
RL	5	Ratu Leone Rotuisolia	(yellow card) 1' to 11'
LL	4	Temo Mayanavanua		(substituted off) 55'
TP	3	Manasa Saulo		(substituted off) 51'
HK	2	Sam Matavesi		(substituted off) 73'
LP	1	Eroni Mawi		(substituted off) 51'	(substituted on) 73'
Replacements:
HK	16	Tevita Ikanivere		(substituted on) 73'
PR	17	Livai Natave	(yellow card) 73' to end'	(substituted on) 51'
PR	18	Luke Tagi		(substituted on) 51'
LK	19	Api Ratuniyarawa		(substituted on) 55'
FL	20	Kitione Kamikamica		(substituted on) 73'
SH	21	Ratu Peni Matawalu		(substituted on) 65'
FH	22	Teti Tela		(substituted on) 57'
FB	23	Sireli Maqala		(substituted on) 37'
Coach:
(New Zealand) Vern Cotter

Player of the Match:
Darcy Graham (Scotland)

Assistant referees:
James Doleman (New Zealand)
Pierre Brousset (France)
Television match official:
Brett Cronan (Australia)

Notes:

- Murphy Walker (Scotland), Sireli Maqala, Livai Natave and Ratu Leone Rotuisolia (all Fiji) made their international debuts.
- Manasa Saulo (Fiji) earned his 50th test cap.

5 November 2022
15:15 GMT (UTC+0)

Wales	23–55	New Zealand
Try: Dyer 25' c Tipuric 51' c Con: Anscombe (2/2) 26', 51'; Pen: Anscombe (3/3) 31', 40+1', 45'	Report	Try: Taylor (2) 11' c, 19' c J. Barrett (2) 34' m, 77' c A. Smith (2) 47' c, 54' c Savea 65' c Taukei'aho 80+1' c Con: Mo'unga (5/6) 12', 20', 48', 54', 65'; B. Barrett (2/2) 78', 80+2'; Pen: Mo'unga (1/1) 5'

Millennium Stadium, Cardiff
Attendance: 72,000
Referee: Wayne Barnes (England)

Team details

FB	15	Gareth Anscombe
RW	14	Louis Rees-Zammit
OC	13	George North
IC	12	Nick Tompkins	(substituted off) 60'
LW	11	Rio Dyer
FH	10	Rhys Priestland	(substituted off) 67'
SH	9	Tomos Williams	(substituted off) 67'
N8	8	Taulupe Faletau
OF	7	Tommy Reffell	(substituted off) 55'
BF	6	Justin Tipuric (c)
RL	5	Adam Beard	(substituted off) 40'
LL	4	Will Rowlands
TP	3	Tomas Francis	(substituted off) 40'
HK	2	Ken Owens	(substituted off) 67'
LP	1	Gareth Thomas	(substituted off) 45'
Replacements:
HK	16	Ryan Elias	(substituted on) 67'
PR	17	Nicky Smith	(substituted on) 45'
PR	18	Dillon Lewis	(substituted on) 40'
LK	19	Alun Wyn Jones	(substituted on) 40'
FL	20	Christ Tshiunza	(substituted on) 55'
SH	21	Kieran Hardy	(substituted on) 67'
FH	22	Sam Costelow	(substituted on) 67'
CE	23	Owen Watkin	(substituted on) 60'
Coach:
(New Zealand) Wayne Pivac

FB	15	Beauden Barrett
RW	14	Sevu Reece	(substituted off) 58'
OC	13	Rieko Ioane
IC	12	Jordie Barrett
LW	11	Caleb Clarke
FH	10	Richie Mo'unga	(substituted off) 72'
SH	9	Aaron Smith	(substituted off) 67'
N8	8	Ardie Savea
OF	7	Dalton Papali'i
BF	6	Shannon Frizell	(substituted off) 62'
RL	5	Scott Barrett	(substituted off) 70'
LL	4	Sam Whitelock (c)
TP	3	Tyrel Lomax	(substituted off) 58'
HK	2	Codie Taylor	(substituted off) 58'
LP	1	Ethan de Groot	(substituted off) 55'
Replacements:
HK	16	Samisoni Taukei'aho	(substituted on) 58'
PR	17	Ofa Tu'ungafasi	(substituted on) 55'
PR	18	Fletcher Newell	(substituted on) 58'
FL	19	Tupou Vaa'i	(substituted on) 70'
FL	20	Akira Ioane	(substituted on) 62'
SH	21	Brad Weber	(substituted on) 67'
FH	22	David Havili	(substituted on) 72'
CE	23	Anton Lienert-Brown	(substituted on) 58'
Coach:
(New Zealand) Ian Foster

Player of the Match:
Ardie Savea (New Zealand)

Assistant referees:
Karl Dickson (England)
Gianluca Gnecchi (Italy)
Television match official:
Brian MacNiece (Ireland)

Notes:

- Rio Dyer and Sam Costelow (both Wales) made their international debuts.
- Aaron Smith (New Zealand) earned his 113th test cap, surpassing Dan Carter as the most-capped back in All Blacks history.
- Ofa Tu'ungafasi (New Zealand) earned his 50th test cap.
- Referee Wayne Barnes became the second referee to officiate his 100th test match, and also equalled Nigel Owens' record for the most test matches refereed.
- New Zealand equaled their record points total against Wales, matching the total of 55 achieved in June 2003. It was also their highest points total away to the Welsh, breaking the previous record of 54 set in October 2021.

5 November 2022
17:30 WET (UTC+0)

Ireland	19–16	South Africa
Try: Van der Flier 46' m Hansen 50' m Pen: Sexton (3/3) 3', 35', 74'	Report	Try: Mostert 67' m Arendse 77' m Pen: Willemse (1/2) 9'; Kolbe (1/1) 40+2'

Aviva Stadium, Dublin
Attendance: 51,000
Referee: Nika Amashukeli (Georgia)

Team details

FB	15	Hugo Keenan
RW	14	Robert Baloucoune
OC	13	Garry Ringrose
IC	12	Stuart McCloskey	(substituted off) 27'
LW	11	Mack Hansen
FH	10	Johnny Sexton (c)	(substituted off) 78'
SH	9	Conor Murray	(substituted off) 35'
N8	8	Caelan Doris
OF	7	Josh van der Flier
BF	6	Peter O'Mahony	(substituted off) 69'
RL	5	James Ryan
LL	4	Tadhg Beirne	(substituted off) 64'
TP	3	Tadhg Furlong	(substituted off) 40'
HK	2	Dan Sheehan	(substituted off) 64'
LP	1	Andrew Porter	(substituted off) 69'
Replacements:
HK	16	Rob Herring	(substituted on) 64'
PR	17	Cian Healy	(substituted on) 69'
PR	18	Finlay Bealham	(substituted on) 40'
LK	19	Kieran Treadwell	(substituted on) 64'
N8	20	Jack Conan	(substituted on) 69'
SH	21	Jamison Gibson-Park	(substituted on) 35'
FH	22	Joey Carbery	(substituted on) 78'
WG	23	Jimmy O'Brien	(substituted on) 27'
Coach:
(England) Andy Farrell

FB	15	Cheslin Kolbe	(yellow card) 17' to 27'
RW	14	Kurt-Lee Arendse		(substituted off) 53'	(substituted on) 65'
OC	13	Jesse Kriel
IC	12	Damian de Allende
LW	11	Makazole Mapimpi			(substituted off) 65'
FH	10	Damian Willemse
SH	9	Jaden Hendrikse		(substituted off) 52'
N8	8	Jasper Wiese		(substituted off) 52'
BF	7	Pieter-Steph du Toit		(substituted off) 64'
OF	6	Siya Kolisi (c)
RL	5	Lood de Jager		(substituted off) 35'
LL	4	Eben Etzebeth
TP	3	Frans Malherbe		(substituted off) 45'
HK	2	Malcolm Marx		(substituted off) 57'
LP	1	Steven Kitshoff		(substituted off) 57'
Replacements:
HK	16	Bongi Mbonambi		(substituted on) 57'
PR	17	Ox Nché		(substituted on) 57'
PR	18	Vincent Koch		(substituted on) 45'
LK	19	Franco Mostert		(substituted on) 34'
FL	20	Kwagga Smith		(substituted on) 52'
FL	21	Deon Fourie		(substituted on) 64'
SH	22	Faf de Klerk		(substituted on) 52'
FB	23	Willie le Roux		(substituted on) 53'
Coach:
(South Africa) Jacques Nienaber

Player of the Match:
Josh van der Flier (Ireland)

Assistant referees:
Mathieu Raynal (France)
Andrea Piardi (Italy)
Television match official:
Stuart Terheege (England)

Notes:

- Jimmy O'Brien (Ireland) made his international debut.
- Conor Murray became the eighth player to earn his 100th test cap for Ireland.

5 November 2022
18:30 CET (UTC+1)

Spain	6–40	Tonga
Pen: Vinuesa (2/2) 6', 40'		Try: Moli 30' c Havili 36' m Funaki (2) 74' c, 80' c Fifita 77' m Con: Havili (3/5) 31', 74', 80+1'; Pen: Havili (2/2) 3', 61'; Mausia (1/1) 10'

Estadio Ciudad de Málaga, Málaga
Attendance: 6,000
Referee: Damon Murphy (Australia)

Team details

FB	15	J. W. Bell
RW	14	Guillermo Domínguez	(substituted off) 54'
OC	13	Iñaki Mateu
IC	12	Gonzalo López Bontempo
LW	11	Jordi Jorba
FH	10	Gonzalo Vinuesa	(substituted off) 54'
SH	9	Kerman Aurrekoetxea	(substituted off) 72'
N8	8	Afaese Tauli	(substituted off) 62'
OF	7	Facundo Domínguez
BF	6	Matthew Foulds
RL	5	Víctor Sánchez	(substituted off) 51'
LL	4	Manuel Mora
TP	3	Jon Zabala (c)
HK	2	Vicente del Hoyo	(substituted off) 47'
LP	1	Thierry Feuteu	(substituted off) 66'
Replacements:
HK	16	Santiago Ovejero	(substituted on) 47'
PR	17	Raúl Calzón	(substituted on) 66'
PR	18	Bittor Aboitiz
LK	19	Alejandro Suárez	(substituted on) 62'
FL	20	Brice Ferrer	(substituted on) 51'
SH	21	Nicolas Rocaríes	(substituted on) 72'
FH	22	Bautista Güemes	(substituted on) 54'
WG	23	Julen Goia	(substituted on) 54'
Coach:
(Spain) Santiago Santos

FB	15	Otumaka Mausia	(substituted off) 74'
RW	14	Tima Fainga'anuku
OC	13	Malakai Fekitoa
IC	12	George Moala
LW	11	Solomone Kata	(substituted off) 68'
FH	10	William Havili
SH	9	Augustine Pulu	(substituted off) 74'
N8	8	Sione Havili Talitui
OF	7	Solomone Funaki
BF	6	Zane Kapeli	(substituted off) 67'
RL	5	Vaea Fifita
LL	4	Leva Fifita	(substituted off) 67'
TP	3	Ben Tameifuna (c)	(substituted off) 60'
HK	2	Sam Moli	(substituted off) 72'
LP	1	Tau Koloamatangi	(substituted off) 60'
Replacements:
HK	16	Jay Fonokalafi	(substituted on) 72'
PR	17	David Lolohea	(substituted on) 60'
PR	18	Phil Kite	(substituted on) 60'
LK	19	Steve Mafi	(substituted on) 67'
FL	20	Tanginoa Halaifonua	(substituted on) 67'
SH	21	Aisea Halo	(substituted on) 74'
CE	22	Afusipa Taumoepeau	(substituted on) 74'
WG	23	Anzelo Tuitavuki	(substituted on) 68'
Coach:
(Australia) Toutai Kefu

Assistant referees:
Ludovic Cayre (France)
Adrien Marbot (France)

Notes:

- Gonzalo López Bontempo, Raúl Calzón, Alejandro Suárez and Nico Rocaríes (all Spain) made their international debuts.
- Tau Koloamatangi, Vaea Fifita, Augustine Pulu and George Moala (all Tonga) made their international debuts. Fifita, Pulu and Moala had previously played for New Zealand, while Koloamatangi had previously played for Hong Kong, but all were able to change countries as a result of a change in international eligibility rules adopted by World Rugby on 24 November 2021.

5 November 2022
21:00 CET (UTC+1)

France	30–29	Australia
Try: Marchand 40+1' c Penaud 76' m Con: Ramos (1/2) 40+2'; Pen: Ramos (6/7) 7', 10', 33', 38', 47', 73'	Report	Try: Foketi 17' c Campbell 57' c Con: Foley (2/2) 17', 59'; Pen: Foley (4/5) 4', 13', 43', 66'; Hodge (1/1) 75'

Stade de France, Saint-Denis
Attendance: 79,000
Referee: Jaco Peyper (South Africa)

Team details

FB	15	Thomas Ramos
RW	14	Damian Penaud
OC	13	Gaël Fickou	(substituted off) 66'
IC	12	Jonathan Danty
LW	11	Yoram Moefana
FH	10	Romain Ntamack	(substituted off) 58'
SH	9	Antoine Dupont (c)
N8	8	Grégory Alldritt
OF	7	Charles Ollivon
BF	6	Anthony Jelonch
RL	5	Thibaud Flament
LL	4	Cameron Woki	(substituted off) 50'
TP	3	Uini Atonio	(substituted off) 54'
HK	2	Julien Marchand	(substituted off) 54'
LP	1	Cyril Baille	(substituted off) 54'
Replacements:
HK	16	Peato Mauvaka	(substituted on) 54'
PR	17	Dany Priso	(substituted on) 54'
PR	18	Sipili Falatea	(substituted on) 54'
LK	19	Romain Taofifénua	(substituted on) 50'
WG	20	Matthis Lebel	(substituted on) 66'
FL	21	Sekou Macalou
SH	22	Maxime Lucu
FH	23	Matthieu Jalibert	(substituted on) 58'
Coach:
(France) Fabien Galthié

FB	15	Jock Campbell
RW	14	Andrew Kellaway
OC	13	Len Ikitau
IC	12	Lalakai Foketi	(substituted off) 25'
LW	11	Tom Wright
FH	10	Bernard Foley	(substituted off) 72'
SH	9	Nic White	(substituted off) 61'
N8	8	Rob Valetini
OF	7	Michael Hooper	(substituted off) 71'
BF	6	Jed Holloway
RL	5	Cadeyrn Neville	(substituted off) 54'
LL	4	Nick Frost
TP	3	Taniela Tupou	(substituted off) 71'
HK	2	Dave Porecki	(substituted off) 53'
LP	1	James Slipper (c)	(substituted off) 78'
Replacements:
HK	16	Folau Fainga'a	(substituted on) 53'
PR	17	Matt Gibbon	(substituted on) 78'
PR	18	Tom Robertson	(substituted on) 71'
LK	19	Will Skelton	(substituted on) 54'
FL	20	Pete Samu	(substituted on) 71'
SH	21	Jake Gordon	(substituted on) 61'
CE	22	Hunter Paisami	(substituted on) 25'
FH	23	Reece Hodge	(substituted on) 72'
Coach:
(New Zealand) Dave Rennie

Player of the Match:
Grégory Alldritt (France)

Assistant referees:
Ben O'Keeffe (New Zealand)
Craig Evans (Wales)
Television match official:
Tom Foley (England)

Notes:

- France reclaim the Trophée des Bicentenaires for the first time since 2014.

6 November 2022
18:00 GST (UTC+4)

Georgia	34–18	Uruguay
Try: Gorgadze (3) 10' c, 21' c, 38' c Papidze 44' c Con: Abzhandadze (4/4) 11', 22', 39', 45'; Pen: Abzhandadze (2/3) 8', 69'		Try: Pujadas 29' c Silva 67' m Con: Berchesi (1/2) 30'; Pen: Berchesi (2/2) 2', 32'

Dinamo Arena, Tbilisi
Referee: Paul Williams (New Zealand)

Team details

FB	15	Davit Niniashvili
RW	14	Aka Tabutsadze
OC	13	Giorgi Kveseladze
IC	12	Merab Sharikadze (c)
LW	11	Alexander Todua		(substituted off) 65'
FH	10	Tedo Abzhandadze	(yellow card) 54' to 64'	(substituted off) 76'
SH	9	Vasil Lobzhanidze		(substituted off) 76'
N8	8	Tornike Jalaghonia		(substituted off) 70'
OF	7	Beka Saghinadze
BF	6	Beka Gorgadze
RL	5	Konstantin Mikautadze		(substituted off) 59'
LL	4	Lado Chachanidze
TP	3	Guram Papidze		(substituted off) 46'
HK	2	Shalva Mamukashvili		(substituted off) 52'
LP	1	Guram Gogichashvili		(substituted off) 57'
Replacements:
HK	16	Giorgi Chkoidze		(substituted on) 52'
PR	17	Nika Abuladze		(substituted on) 57'
PR	18	Vakh Abdaladze		(substituted on) 46'
LK	19	Nodar Cheishvili		(substituted on) 59'
FL	20	Otar Giorgadze		(substituted on) 70'
SH	21	Tengiz Peranidze		(substituted on) 76'
FH	22	Luka Matkava		(substituted on) 76'
WG	23	Demur Tapladze		(substituted on) 65'
Coach:
(Georgia (country)) Levan Maisashvili

FB	15	Felipe Echeverry	(yellow card) 20' to 30'
RW	14	Rodrigo Silva
OC	13	Felipe Arcos Pérez		(substituted off) 61'
IC	12	Andrés Vilaseca (c)
LW	11	Juan Manuel Alonso
FH	10	Felipe Berchesi
SH	9	Tomás Inciarte		(substituted off) 70'
N8	8	Manuel Ardao		(substituted off) 72'
OF	7	Santiago Civetta
BF	6	Eric Dosantos		(substituted off) 51'
RL	5	Manuel Leindekar
LL	4	Ignacio Dotti		(substituted off) 68'
TP	3	Ignacio Péculo		(substituted off) 70'
HK	2	Guillermo Pujadas		(substituted off) 61'
LP	1	Mateo Sanguinetti		(substituted off) 68'
Replacements:
HK	16	Facundo Gattas		(substituted on) 61'
PR	17	Matías Benítez		(substituted on) 68'
PR	18	Matías Franco		(substituted on) 70'
LK	19	Diego Magno		(substituted on) 68'
FL	20	Lucas Bianchi		(substituted on) 51'
FL	21	Manuel Diana		(substituted on) 72'
SH	22	Santiago Álvarez		(substituted on) 70'
FH	23	Juan Zuccarino		(substituted on) 61'
Coach:
(Argentina) Esteban Meneses

Assistant referees:
Anthony Woodthorpe (England)
Moe Chaudhry (Canada)
Television match official:
Chris Hart (New Zealand)

Notes:

- Vakh Abdaladze, Luka Matkava, Guram Papidze, Tengiz Peranidze (all Georgia) and Juan Zuccarino (Uruguay) made their international debuts.

6 November 2022
14:15 GMT (UTC+0)

England	29–30	Argentina
Try: Cokanasiga 24' c Van Poortvliet 54' c Con: Farrell (2/2) 25', 55'; Pen: Farrell (5/5) 12', 36', 42', 60', 66'	Report	Try: Boffelli 46' m S. Carreras 50' c Con: Boffelli (1/2) 51'; Pen: Boffelli (6/6) 9', 15', 33', 38', 63', 69'

Twickenham Stadium, London
Attendance: 80,790
Referee: Andrew Brace (Ireland)

Team details

FB	15	Freddie Steward
RW	14	Jack Nowell
OC	13	Manu Tuilagi	(substituted off) 67'
IC	12	Owen Farrell (c)
LW	11	Joe Cokanasiga
FH	10	Marcus Smith
SH	9	Ben Youngs	(substituted off) 54'
N8	8	Billy Vunipola	(substituted off) 56'
OF	7	Tom Curry
BF	6	Maro Itoje
RL	5	Jonny Hill
LL	4	Alex Coles	(substituted off) 74'
TP	3	Kyle Sinckler	(substituted off) 73'
HK	2	Luke Cowan-Dickie
LP	1	Ellis Genge	(substituted off) 58'
Replacements:
HK	16	Jack Singleton
PR	17	Mako Vunipola	(substituted on) 58'
PR	18	Joe Heyes	(substituted on) 73'
LK	19	David Ribbans
N8	20	Sam Simmonds	(substituted on) 56'
FL	21	Jack Willis	(substituted on) 74'
SH	22	Jack van Poortvliet	(substituted on) 54'
CE	23	Henry Slade	(substituted on) 67'
Coach:
(Australia) Eddie Jones

FB	15	Juan Cruz Mallía
RW	14	Mateo Carreras	(substituted off) 67'
OC	13	Matías Moroni
IC	12	Jerónimo de la Fuente
LW	11	Emiliano Boffelli
FH	10	Santiago Carreras
SH	9	Gonzalo Bertranou
N8	8	Pablo Matera
OF	7	Marcos Kremer	(substituted off) 73'
BF	6	Juan Martín González
RL	5	Tomás Lavanini	(substituted off) 56'
LL	4	Matías Alemanno
TP	3	Francisco Gómez Kodela	(substituted off) 56'
HK	2	Julián Montoya (c)	(substituted off) 67'
LP	1	Thomas Gallo
Replacements:
HK	16	Ignacio Ruiz	(substituted on) 67'
PR	17	Nahuel Tetaz Chaparro
PR	18	Eduardo Bello	(substituted on) 56'
LK	19	Lucas Paulos	(substituted on) 73'
FL	20	Facundo Isa	(substituted on) 56'
SH	21	Eliseo Morales
FH	22	Tomás Albornoz
CE	23	Matías Orlando	(substituted on) 67'
Coach:
(Australia) Michael Cheika

Player of the Match:
Emiliano Boffelli (Argentina)

Assistant referees:
Frank Murphy (Ireland)
Pierre Brousset (France)
Television match official:
Marius Jonker (South Africa)

Notes:

- Alex Coles (England) made his international debut.
- Argentina recorded their first win over England since their 24–22 victory in 2009, and their first at Twickenham since 2006.

=== 12/13 November ===
12 November 2022
13:00 EET (UTC+2)

Tonga	39–10	Chile
Try: Lousi 35' c Pulu 42' c Fainga'anuku 48' m Funaki 57' c Lolohea 79' c Con: W. Havili (4/5) 36', 43', 59', 80'; Pen: Mausia (1/2) 5'; W. Havili (1/1) 33'	Report	Try: Escobar 65' c Con: Videla (1/1) 30'; Pen: Videla (1/1) 66'

Stadionul Arcul de Triumf, Bucharest, Romania
Referee: Luc Ramos (France)

Team details

FB	15	Otumaka Mausia
RW	14	Tima Fainga'anuku
OC	13	Afusipa Taumoepeau
IC	12	George Moala		(substituted off) 65'
LW	11	Solomone Kata		(substituted off) 54'
FH	10	William Havili
SH	9	Augustine Pulu		(substituted off) 72'
N8	8	Sione Havili Talitui			(substituted off) 64'	(substituted on) 72'
OF	7	Solomone Funaki		(substituted off) 59'
BF	6	Vaea Fifita
RL	5	Sam Lousi
LL	4	Leva Fifita		(substituted off) 59'
TP	3	Ben Tameifuna (c)		(substituted off) 48'
HK	2	Sam Moli		(substituted off) 48'
LP	1	Tau Koloamatangi		(substituted off) 48'	(substituted on) 64'	(substituted off) 72'
Replacements:
HK	16	Jay Fonokalafi		(substituted on) 48'
PR	17	David Lolohea	(yellow card) 62' to 72'	(substituted on) 48'
PR	18	Siate Tokolahi		(substituted on) 48'
LK	19	Tanginoa Halaifonua		(substituted on) 59'
FL	20	Zane Kapeli		(substituted on) 59'
SH	21	Manu Paea		(substituted on) 72'
CE	22	Fetuli Paea		(substituted on) 65'
WG	23	Anzelo Tuitavuki		(substituted on) 54'
Coach:
(Australia) Toutai Kefu

FB	15	Santiago Videla
RW	14	Iñaki Ayarza
OC	13	Matías Garafulic
IC	12	José Larenas	(substituted off) 45'
LW	11	Pablo Casas
FH	10	Rodrigo Fernández
SH	9	Lukas Carvallo	(substituted off) 48'
N8	8	Raimundo Martínez	(substituted off) 59'
OF	7	Clemente Saavedra
BF	6	Martín Sigren (c)
RL	5	Javier Eissmann	(substituted off) 20'
LL	4	Santiago Pedrero	(substituted off) 44'
TP	3	Matías Dittus	(substituted off) 44'
HK	2	Augusto Böhme	(substituted off) 44'
LP	1	Javier Carrasco	(substituted off) 44'
Replacements:
HK	16	Diego Escobar	(substituted on) 44'
PR	17	Salvador Lues	(substituted on) 44'
PR	18	Iñaki Gurruchaga	(substituted on) 44'
LK	19	Pablo Huete	(substituted on) 59'
FL	20	Joaquín Milesi	(substituted on) 74'
SH	21	Marcelo Torrealba	(substituted on) 48'
WG	22	Nicolas Garafulic	(substituted on) 45'
FL	23	Ignacio Silva	(substituted on) 44'
Coach:
(Uruguay) Pablo Lemoine

Assistant referees:
Ben Blain (Scotland)
Ben Breakspear (Wales)
Television match official:
Brett Cronan (Australia)

12 November 2022
13:00 WET (UTC+0)

Ireland	35–17	Fiji
Try: Timoney (2) 15' c, 20' c Baloucoune 25' c Hansen 61' c Healy 74' c Con: Carbery (3/3) 16', 21', 26'; Crowley (2/2) 62', 75'	Report	Try: Ravouvou 4' c Kuruvoli 64' c Con: Tela (1/1) 5'; Volavola (1/1) 65'; Pen: Tela (1/1) 23'

Aviva Stadium, Dublin
Attendance: 51,000
Referee: Mathieu Raynal (France)

Team details

FB	15	Jimmy O'Brien		(substituted off) 76'
RW	14	Robert Baloucoune
OC	13	Robbie Henshaw	(substituted off) 5'
IC	12	Stuart McCloskey
LW	11	Mack Hansen
FH	10	Joey Carbery	(substituted off) 46'
SH	9	Jamison Gibson-Park	(substituted off) 50'	(substituted on) 76'
N8	8	Jack Conan
OF	7	Nick Timoney
BF	6	Caelan Doris	(substituted off) 60'
RL	5	Tadhg Beirne
LL	4	Kieran Treadwell	(substituted off) 50'
TP	3	Tadhg Furlong (c)	(substituted off) 50'
HK	2	Rob Herring	(substituted off) 73'
LP	1	Jeremy Loughman	(substituted off) 62'
Replacements:
HK	16	Dan Sheehan	(substituted on) 73'
PR	17	Cian Healy	(substituted on) 62'
PR	18	Tom O'Toole	(substituted on) 50'
FL	19	Cian Prendergast	(substituted on) 50'
FL	20	Max Deegan	(substituted on) 60'
SH	21	Craig Casey	(substituted on) 50'
CE	22	Jack Crowley	(substituted on) 46'
CE	23	Garry Ringrose	(substituted on) 5'
Coach:
(England) Andy Farrell

FB	15	Seta Tuicuvu
RW	14	Jiuta Wainiqolo
OC	13	Waisea Nayacalevu (c)
IC	12	Kalaveti Ravouvou		(substituted off) 59'
LW	11	Vinaya Habosi
FH	10	Teti Tela		(substituted off) 44'
SH	9	Frank Lomani		(substituted off) 48'
N8	8	Viliame Mata
OF	7	Levani Botia		(substituted off) 55'
BF	6	Albert Tuisue	(red card) 46'
RL	5	Ratu Leone Rotuisolia		(substituted off) 24'
LL	4	Isoa Nasilasila
TP	3	Manasa Saulo	(yellow card) 19' to 29'	(substituted off) 63'
HK	2	Sam Matavesi		(substituted off) 76'
LP	1	Eroni Mawi		(substituted off) 59'
Replacements:
HK	16	Mesu Dolokoto		(substituted on) 76'
PR	17	Livai Natave		(substituted on) 59'
PR	18	Lee-Roy Atalifo		(substituted on) 63'
LK	19	Api Ratuniyarawa	(yellow card) 51' to 61'	(substituted on) 24'
FL	20	John Dyer		(substituted on) 55'
SH	21	Simione Kuruvoli		(substituted on) 48'
FH	22	Ben Volavola		(substituted on) 44'
CE	23	Adrea Cocagi		(substituted on) 59'
Coach:
(New Zealand) Vern Cotter

Player of the Match:

Nick Timoney (Ireland)

Assistant referees:
Tual Trainini (France)
Jordan Way (Australia)
Television match official:
Chris Hart (New Zealand)

Notes:

- Jack Crowley, Jeremy Loughman and Cian Prendergast (all Ireland) made their international debuts.
- Crowley and Prendergast jointly became the first players born in the twenty-first century to play for Ireland.

12 November 2022
14:00 CET (UTC+1)

Italy	28–27	Australia
Try: Bruno 18' c Capuozzo (2) 25' c, 64' m Con: Allan (2/3) 20', 27'; Pen: Allan (2/4) 1', 52'; Padovani (1/2) 74'	Report	Try: Wright 30' m McReight 43' c Robertson 67' c Neville 80' m Con: Lolesio (2/3) 44', 69'; Pen: Lolesio (1/1) 5'

Stadio Artemio Franchi, Florence
Attendance: 20,321
Referee: Brendon Pickerill (New Zealand)

Team details

FB	15	Ange Capuozzo
RW	14	Pierre Bruno
OC	13	Ignacio Brex
IC	12	Luca Morisi	(substituted off) 46'
LW	11	Monty Ioane
FH	10	Tommaso Allan	(substituted off) 69'
SH	9	Stephen Varney
N8	8	Lorenzo Cannone
OF	7	Michele Lamaro (c)
BF	6	Sebastian Negri	(substituted off) 57'
RL	5	Federico Ruzza
LL	4	Niccolò Cannone
TP	3	Simone Ferrari	(substituted off) 46'
HK	2	Gianmarco Lucchesi	(substituted off) 57'
LP	1	Danilo Fischetti	(substituted off) 57'
Replacements:
HK	16	Giacomo Nicotera	(substituted on) 57'
PR	17	Ivan Nemer	(substituted on) 57'
PR	18	Pietro Ceccarelli	(substituted on) 46'
LK	19	David Sisi		(substituted on) 69'
N8	20	Toa Halafihi	(substituted on) 57'	(substituted off) 69'
SH	21	Alessandro Garbisi
FB	22	Edoardo Padovani	(substituted on) 69'
CE	23	Tommaso Menoncello	(substituted on) 46'
Coach:
(New Zealand) Kieran Crowley

FB	15	Jock Campbell		(substituted off) 66'
RW	14	Mark Nawaqanitawase
OC	13	Len Ikitau
IC	12	Hunter Paisami
LW	11	Tom Wright
FH	10	Noah Lolesio		(substituted off) 75'
SH	9	Jake Gordon	(yellow card) 14' to 24'	(substituted off) 54'
N8	8	Pete Samu		(substituted off) 66'
OF	7	Fraser McReight
BF	6	Ned Hanigan
RL	5	Will Skelton		(substituted off) 57'
LL	4	Darcy Swain
TP	3	Allan Alaalatoa (c)		(substituted off) 60'
HK	2	Folau Fainga'a		(substituted off) 54'
LP	1	Matt Gibbon		(substituted off) 60'
Replacements:
HK	16	Lachlan Lonergan		(substituted on) 54'
PR	17	Tom Robertson		(substituted on) 60'
PR	18	Taniela Tupou		(substituted on) 60'
LK	19	Cadeyrn Neville		(substituted on) 57'
FL	20	Langi Gleeson		(substituted on) 66'
SH	21	Tate McDermott		(substituted on) 54'
FH	22	Ben Donaldson		(substituted on) 75'
CE	23	Jordan Petaia		(substituted on) 66'
Coach:
(New Zealand) Dave Rennie

Player of the Match:
Gianmarco Lucchesi (Italy)

Assistant referees:
Andrew Brace (Ireland)
Adam Leal (England)
Television match official:
Marius Jonker (South Africa)

Notes:

- Italy recorded their first ever Test victory over Australia after 18 consecutive defeats, dating back to the first meeting between the two countries in October 1983.
- Ben Donaldson and Mark Nawaqanitawase (both Australia) made their test debuts.

12 November 2022
14:30 CET (UTC+1)

Netherlands	25–37	Canada
Try: Limmen 35' c Wagemaker 75' c Wierenga 80' m Con: Lydon (2/3) 36', 76'; Pen: Lydon (2/3) 14', 19'	Report	Try: Baude 22' c Stevens 50' c Rumball 60' c Larsen 67' c Con: Coats (4/4) 23', 51', 61', 68'; Pen: Coats (3/3) 10', 33', 78'

NRCA Stadium, Amsterdam
Referee: Benoit Rousselet (France)

Team details

FB	15	Peter Lydon
RW	14	Daan van der Avoird	(yellow card) 49' to 59'
OC	13	Leroy Van Dam
IC	12	Daily Limmen		(substituted off) 69'
LW	11	Siem Noorman
FH	10	Willie du Plessis		(substituted off) 69'
SH	9	Rik van Balkom		(substituted off) 51'
N8	8	Stijn Albers		(substituted off) 54'
OF	7	Wolf van Dijk
BF	6	Spike Salman
RL	5	Louis Bruinsma
LL	4	Koen Bloemen		(substituted off) 57'
TP	3	Andrew Darlington		(substituted off) 40'
HK	2	Ross Bennie-Coulson		(substituted off) 67'
LP	1	Hugo Langelaan (c)		(substituted off) 68'
Replacements:
HK	16	Jessy Wagemaker		(substituted on) 67'
PR	17	Lodi Buijs		(substituted on) 68'
PR	18	Delano Jansen van der Sligte		(substituted on) 40'
LK	19	Jim Boelrijk		(substituted on) 57'
FL	20	Dirk Wierenga		(substituted on) 54'
SH	21	Mark Coebergh		(substituted on) 51'
FH	22	Kevin Lenssen		(substituted on) 69'
FB	23	Te Hauora Campbell		(substituted on) 69'
Coach:
(Wales) Lyn Jones

FB	15	Cooper Coats
RW	14	Andrew Coe
OC	13	Ben LeSage (c)	(substituted off) 67'
IC	12	Josh Thiel
LW	11	Josiah Morra	(substituted off) 62'	(substituted on) 79'
FH	10	Robbie Povey
SH	9	Ross Braude	(substituted off) 62'
N8	8	Siaki Vikilani
OF	7	Lucas Rumball (c)	(substituted off) 71'
BF	6	Kyle Baillie	(substituted off) 64'
RL	5	Josh Larsen
LL	4	Corey Thomas
TP	3	Tyler Rowland	(substituted off) 56'
HK	2	Lindsey Stevens	(substituted off) 56'
LP	1	Liam Murray	(substituted off) 27'
Replacements:
HK	16	Andrew Quattrin	(substituted on) 56'
PR	17	Djustice Sears-Duru	(substituted on) 27'
PR	18	Conor Young	(substituted on) 56'
LK	19	Callum Botchar	(substituted on) 64'
FL	20	Matthew Klimchuk	(substituted on) 71'
SH	21	Jason Higgins	(substituted on) 62'
WG	22	David Richard	(substituted on) 67'
WG	23	Brock Webster	(substituted on) 62'	(substituted off) 79'
Coach:
(Wales) Kingsley Jones

Assistant referees:
Vivien Praderie (France)
Jérémy Rozier (France)

Notes:

- Stijn Albers, Leroy van Dam, Kevin Lenssen, Peter Lydon, Willie du Plessis, Jessy Wagemaker, Dirk Wierenga (all Netherlands) and Matthew Klimchuk (Canada) made their international debuts.

12 November 2022
16:00 CET (UTC+1)

Spain	34–15	Namibia
Try: Del Hoyo 6' c Merkler 13' m Pichardie 49' m Aurrekoetxea 62' c Mateu 73' c Con: Vinuesa (1/2) 8'; Güemes (2/3) 63', 74'; Pen: Vinuesa (1/1) 35'		Try: Loubser 26' c Retief 38' m Con: Loubser (1/2) 27'; Pen: Loubser (1/1) 53'

Estadio Universidad Complutense de Madrid, Madrid
Referee: Paul Williams (New Zealand)

Team details

FB	15	J. W. Bell
RW	14	Martín Alonso
OC	13	Iñaki Mateu
IC	12	Alejandro Alonso
LW	11	Jordi Jorba	(substituted off) 61'
FH	10	Gonzalo Vinuesa	(substituted off) 45'
SH	9	Kerman Aurrekoetxea	(substituted off) 74'
N8	8	Afaese Tauli (c)
OF	7	Facundo Domínguez
BF	6	Mario Pichardie	(substituted off) 66'
RL	5	Matthew Foulds	(substituted off) 51'
LL	4	Alejandro Suárez
TP	3	Joel Merkler	(substituted off) 59'
HK	2	Vicente del Hoyo	(substituted off) 57'
LP	1	Thierry Feuteu	(substituted off) 66'
Replacements:
HK	16	Pablo Miejimolle	(substituted on) 57'
PR	17	Raúl Calzón	(substituted on) 66'
PR	18	Bittor Aboitiz	(substituted on) 59'
FL	19	Matheo Triki	(substituted on) 66'
FL	20	Brice Ferrer	(substituted on) 51'
SH	21	Nicolas Rocaríes	(substituted on) 74'
FH	22	Bautista Güemes	(substituted on) 45'
WG	23	Julen Goia	(substituted on) 61'
Coach:
(Spain) Santiago Santos

FB	15	Cliven Loubser	(yellow card) 72'
RW	14	Warren Ludwig
OC	13	Johan Deysel (c)
IC	12	Le Roux Malan
LW	11	Divan Rossouw		(substituted off) 45'
FH	10	P. W. Steenkamp		(substituted off) 63'
SH	9	Damian Stevens
N8	8	Prince ǃGaoseb		(substituted off) 69'
OF	7	Janco Venter		(substituted off) 46'
BF	6	Wian Conradie	(yellow card) 6' (red card) 79'
RL	5	Johan Retief
LL	4	Adriaan Ludick		(substituted off) 51'
TP	3	Casper Viviers	(yellow card) 45' to 55'	(substituted off) 69'
HK	2	Louis van der Westhuizen
LP	1	Jason Benade
Replacements:
HK	16	Wicus Jacobs		(substituted on) 72'
PR	17	Jano Otto		(substituted on) 69'
PR	18	Chemigan Beukes
LK	19	P. J. van Lill		(substituted on) 51'
FL	20	Ruan Ludick		(substituted on) 69'	(substituted off) 72'
SH	21	TC Kisting		(substituted on) 46'
FL	22	Adriaan Booysen		(substituted on) 51'
FH	23	André van den Berg		(substituted on) 63'
Coach:
(South Africa) Allister Coetzee

Assistant referees:
Shota Tevzadze (Georgia)
Kahlil Harrison (United States)

Notes:

- Mario Pichardie, Matheo Triki (both Spain), Warren Ludwig, Le Roux Malan, Wicus Jacobs and André van den Berg (all Namibia) made their international debuts.

12 November 2022
18:00 GST (UTC+4)

Georgia	19–20	Samoa
Try: Tabutsadze 49' m Kuntelia 66' m Pen: Abzhandadze (3/4) 11', 29', 72'	Report	Try: Manu (2) 14' c, 75' c Con: Paia'aua (1/1) 15'; Leuila (1/1) 76'; Pen: Paia'aua (2/3) 8', 42'

Dinamo Arena, Tbilisi
Referee: Damon Murphy (Australia)

Team details

FB	15	Davit Niniashvili
RW	14	Aka Tabutsadze		(substituted off) 63'
OC	13	Demur Tapladze
IC	12	Merab Sharikadze (c)
LW	11	Alexander Todua
FH	10	Tedo Abzhandadze
SH	9	Vasil Lobzhanidze
N8	8	Beka Gorgadze
OF	7	Beka Saghinadze
BF	6	Otar Giorgadze	(yellow card) 13' to 23'	(substituted off) 34'	(substituted on) 40'	(substituted off) 58'
RL	5	Konstantin Mikautadze		(substituted off) 66'
LL	4	Nodar Cheishvili
TP	3	Guram Papidze		(substituted off) 61'
HK	2	Giorgi Chkoidze		(substituted off) 50'
LP	1	Guram Gogichashvili		(substituted off) 53'
Replacements:
HK	16	Shalva Mamukashvili		(substituted on) 50'
PR	17	Nika Abuladze		(substituted on) 53'
PR	18	Alexander Kuntelia		(substituted on) 61'
LK	19	Lado Chachanidze		(substituted on) 66'
FL	20	Tornike Jalaghonia		(substituted on) 34'	(substituted off) 40'	(substituted on) 58'
SH	21	Luka Matkava
FH	22	Lasha Khmaladze
WG	23	Mirian Modebadze		(substituted on) 63'
Coach:
(Georgia (country)) Levan Maisashvili

FB	15	Danny Toala		(substituted off) 61'
RW	14	Tomasi Alosio		(substituted off) 71'
OC	13	Tumua Manu
IC	12	Duncan Paia'aua	(red card) 72'
LW	11	Nigel Ah Wong
FH	10	UJ Seuteni
SH	9	Ereatara Enari		(substituted off) 57'
N8	8	Fritz Lee		(substituted off) 45'
OF	7	Jordan Taufua	(yellow card) 50' to 60'
BF	6	Piula Faʻasalele
RL	5	Taleni Seu		(substituted off) 58'
LL	4	Chris Vui
TP	3	Michael Alaalatoa (c)		(substituted off) 65'
HK	2	Seilala Lam		(substituted off) 64'
LP	1	Jordan Lay		(substituted off) 63'
Replacements:
HK	16	Manu Leiataua		(substituted on) 64'
PR	17	Donald Brighouse		(substituted on) 63'
PR	18	Jeffery Toomaga-Allen		(substituted on) 65'
N8	19	Afa Amosa		(substituted on) 45'
FL	20	Tala Gray		(substituted on) 58'
SH	21	Jonathan Taumateine		(substituted on) 57'
CE	22	D'Angelo Leuila		(substituted on) 61'
WG	23	Alapati Leiua		(substituted on) 71'
Coach:
(Samoa) Seilala Mapusua

Assistant referees:
Ludovic Cayre (France)
Moe Chaudhry (Canada)
Television match official:
Matteo Liperini (Italy)

Notes:

- Alexander Kuntelia (Georgia) made his international debut.
- Alexander Todua became the third Georgian to earn their 100th test cap.
- Samoa recorded their first win over Georgia since 2003, and their first in Georgia.

12 November 2022
15:15 GMT (UTC+0)

England	52–13	Japan
Try: Steward 12' c Smith (2) 25' c, 74' c Porter (2) 40' c, 50' c Genge 48' c Penalty try 70'; Con: Farrell (6/6) 14', 26', 40+2', 49', 52', 75'; Pen: Farrell (1/1) 5'	Report	Try: Saito 59' c Con: Lee (1/1) 60'; Pen: Yamasawa (2/2) 32', 35'

Twickenham Stadium, London
Attendance: 81,087
Referee: James Doleman (New Zealand)

Team details

FB	15	Freddie Steward
RW	14	Joe Cokanasiga		(substituted off) 64'
OC	13	Guy Porter		(substituted off) 64'
IC	12	Owen Farrell (c)
LW	11	Jonny May	(yellow card) 35' to 45'
FH	10	Marcus Smith
SH	9	Jack van Poortvliet		(substituted off) 64'
N8	8	Sam Simmonds
OF	7	Tom Curry
BF	6	Maro Itoje
RL	5	Jonny Hill		(substituted off) 61'
LL	4	David Ribbans		(substituted off) 54'
TP	3	Kyle Sinckler		(substituted off) 67'
HK	2	Luke Cowan-Dickie		(substituted off) 53'
LP	1	Ellis Genge		(substituted off) 53'
Replacements:
HK	16	Jamie George		(substituted on) 53'
PR	17	Mako Vunipola		(substituted on) 53'
PR	18	Joe Heyes		(substituted on) 67'
LK	19	Alex Coles		(substituted on) 54'
N8	20	Billy Vunipola		(substituted on) 61'
SH	21	Ben Youngs		(substituted on) 64'
CE	22	Henry Slade		(substituted on) 64'
CE	23	Manu Tuilagi		(substituted on) 64'
Coach:
(Australia) Eddie Jones

FB	15	Ryohei Yamanaka
RW	14	Kotaro Matsushima
OC	13	Dylan Riley
IC	12	Ryoto Nakamura
LW	11	Gerhard van den Heever		(substituted off) 49'
FH	10	Takuya Yamasawa		(substituted off) 40'
SH	9	Yutaka Nagare		(substituted off) 54'
N8	8	Tevita Tatafu		(substituted off) 52'
OF	7	Kazuki Himeno
BF	6	Michael Leitch
RL	5	Jack Cornelsen		(substituted off) 73'
LL	4	Warner Dearns
TP	3	Koo Ji-won		(substituted off) 73'
HK	2	Atsushi Sakate (c)
LP	1	Keita Inagaki		(substituted off) 49'	(substituted on) 79'
Replacements:
HK	16	Kosuke Horikoshi
PR	17	Craig Millar		(substituted on) 49'	(substituted off) 79'
PR	18	Yusuke Kizu		(substituted on) 73'
LK	19	Wimpie van der Walt		(substituted on) 73'
FL	20	Pieter Labuschagne		(substituted on) 52'
SH	21	Naoto Saito		(substituted on) 54'
FH	22	Lee Seung-sin		(substituted on) 40'
WG	23	Siosaia Fifita	(yellow card) 70' to 80'	(substituted on) 49'
Coach:
(New Zealand) Jamie Joseph

Player of the Match:
Freddie Steward (England)

Assistant referees:
Nic Berry (Australia)
Craig Evans (Wales)
Television match official:
Eric Gauzins (France)

Notes:

- David Ribbans (England) made his international debut.
- Henry Slade (England) earned his 50th test cap.

12 November 2022
17:30 GMT (UTC+0)

Wales	20–13	Argentina
Try: Faletau 32' c T. Williams 47' c Con: Anscombe (2/2) 33', 49'; Pen: Anscombe (2/2) 37', 63'	Report	Try: Chaparro 69' c Con: Boffelli (1/1) 70'; Pen: Boffelli (2/2) 8', 14'

Millennium Stadium, Cardiff
Attendance: 59,662
Referee: Ben O'Keeffe (New Zealand)

Team details

FB	15	Louis Rees-Zammit
RW	14	Alex Cuthbert
OC	13	George North
IC	12	Nick Tompkins		(substituted off) 53'
LW	11	Rio Dyer
FH	10	Gareth Anscombe		(substituted off) 55'
SH	9	Tomos Williams
N8	8	Taulupe Faletau
OF	7	Justin Tipuric (c)
BF	6	Dan Lydiate		(substituted off) 28'
RL	5	Adam Beard		(substituted off) 70'
LL	4	Will Rowlands	(yellow card) 56' to 66'	(substituted off) 73'
TP	3	Dillon Lewis		(substituted off) 76'
HK	2	Ken Owens
LP	1	Gareth Thomas		(substituted off) 61'
Replacements:
HK	16	Ryan Elias		(substituted on) 73'
PR	17	Rhodri Jones		(substituted on) 61'
PR	18	Sam Wainwright		(substituted on) 76'
LK	19	Ben Carter		(substituted on) 70'
FL	20	Jac Morgan		(substituted on) 28'
SH	21	Kieran Hardy
FH	22	Rhys Priestland		(substituted on) 55'
CE	23	Owen Watkin		(substituted on) 53'
Coach:
(New Zealand) Wayne Pivac

FB	15	Juan Cruz Mallía
RW	14	Mateo Carreras	(substituted off) 68'
OC	13	Matías Moroni	(substituted off) 60'
IC	12	Jerónimo de la Fuente
LW	11	Emiliano Boffelli
FH	10	Santiago Carreras
SH	9	Gonzalo Bertranou	(substituted off) 66'
N8	8	Pablo Matera (c)
OF	7	Marcos Kremer	(substituted off) 66'
BF	6	Juan Martín González
RL	5	Tomás Lavanini	(substituted off) 55'
LL	4	Matías Alemanno
TP	3	Francisco Gómez Kodela	(substituted off) 60'
HK	2	Agustín Creevy	(substituted off) 49'
LP	1	Thomas Gallo	(substituted off) 49'
Replacements:
HK	16	Ignacio Ruiz	(substituted on) 49'
PR	17	Nahuel Tetaz Chaparro	(substituted on) 49'
PR	18	Eduardo Bello	(substituted on) 60'
LK	19	Lucas Paulos	(substituted on) 66'
N8	20	Facundo Isa	(substituted on) 55'
SH	21	Eliseo Morales	(substituted on) 66'
FH	22	Tomás Albornoz	(substituted on) 68'
CE	23	Matías Orlando	(substituted on) 60'
Coach:
(Australia) Michael Cheika

Player of the Match:
Taulupe Faletau (Wales)

Assistant referees:
Angus Gardner (Australia)
Andrea Piardi (Italy)
Television match official:
Marius van der Westhuizen (South Africa)

Notes:

- Eliseo Morales (Argentina) made his international debut.

12 November 2022
21:00 CET (UTC+1)

France	30–26	South Africa
Try: Baille 21' c Falatea 75' m Con: Ramos (1/2) 22'; Pen: Ramos (6/6) 3', 17', 40+1', 46', 59', 79'	Report	Try: Kolisi 30' c Arendse 51' c Con: Kolbe (1/1) 31'; De Klerk (1/1) 52'; Pen: Kolbe (2/2) 26', 43'; De Klerk (1/1) 55'; Willemse (1/1) 64'

Stade Vélodrome, Marseille
Attendance: 62,500
Referee: Wayne Barnes (England)

Team details

FB	15	Thomas Ramos
RW	14	Damian Penaud
OC	13	Gaël Fickou
IC	12	Jonathan Danty		(substituted off) 12'
LW	11	Yoram Moefana
FH	10	Romain Ntamack		(substituted off) 71'
SH	9	Antoine Dupont (c)	(red card) 48'
N8	8	Grégory Alldritt		(substituted off) 53'
OF	7	Charles Ollivon
BF	6	Anthony Jelonch
RL	5	Thibaud Flament		(substituted off) 31'
LL	4	Cameron Woki		(substituted off) 77'
TP	3	Uini Atonio		(substituted off) 60'
HK	2	Julien Marchand		(substituted off) 60'
LP	1	Cyril Baille		(substituted off) 40'
Replacements:
HK	16	Peato Mauvaka		(substituted on) 60'
PR	17	Reda Wardi		(substituted on) 40'
PR	18	Sipili Falatea		(substituted on) 60'
LK	19	Romain Taofifénua		(substituted on) 31'
LK	20	Bastien Chalureau		(substituted on) 77'
FL	21	Sekou Macalou		(substituted on) 12'
SH	22	Maxime Lucu		(substituted on) 53'
FH	23	Matthieu Jalibert		(substituted on) 71'
Coach:
(France) Fabien Galthié

FB	15	Willie le Roux
RW	14	Cheslin Kolbe		(substituted off) 48'
OC	13	Jesse Kriel		(substituted off) 76'
IC	12	Damian de Allende
LW	11	Kurt-Lee Arendse
FH	10	Damian Willemse
SH	9	Faf de Klerk		(substituted off) 60'
N8	8	Kwagga Smith		(substituted off) 60'
BF	7	Pieter-Steph du Toit	(red card) 12'
OF	6	Siya Kolisi (c)		(substituted off) 72'
RL	5	Franco Mostert
LL	4	Eben Etzebeth
TP	3	Frans Malherbe		(substituted off) 51'
HK	2	Bongi Mbonambi		(substituted off) 29'	(substituted on) 40'	(substituted off) 51'
LP	1	Ox Nché		(substituted off) 51'
Replacements:
HK	16	Malcolm Marx		(substituted on) 29'	(substituted off) 40'	(substituted on) 51'
PR	17	Steven Kitshoff		(substituted on) 51'
PR	18	Vincent Koch		(substituted on) 51'
LK	19	Marvin Orie		(substituted on) 72'
FL	20	Deon Fourie	(yellow card) 70' to 80'	(substituted on) 60'
SH	21	Cobus Reinach		(substituted on) 60'
FH	22	Manie Libbok		(substituted on) 76'
WG	23	Makazole Mapimpi		(substituted on) 48'
Coach:
(South Africa) Jacques Nienaber

Player of the Match:
Anthony Jelonch (France)

Assistant referees:
Karl Dickson (England)
Christophe Ridley (England)
Television match official:
Brian MacNeice (Ireland)

Notes:

- Bastien Chalureau, Reda Wardi (both France) and Manie Libbok (South Africa) made their international debuts.

13 November 2022
13:30 EET (UTC+2)

Romania	16–21	Uruguay
Try: Chirică 26' c Con: Popa (1/1) 28'; Pen: Popa (3/3) 7', 17', 78'		Try: Amaya (2) 71' m, 80+1' c Con: Berchesi (1/2) 80+3'; Pen: Berchesi (3/3) 12', 21', 58'

Stadionul Arcul de Triumf, Bucharest
Referee: Pierre Brousset (France)

Team details

FB	15	Hinckley Vaovasa	(substituted off) 62'
RW	14	Nicolas Onuțu
OC	13	Alexandru Bucur	(substituted off) 74'
IC	12	Fonovai Tangimana
LW	11	Atila Septar
FH	10	Vlăduț Popa
SH	9	Florin Surugiu	(substituted off) 65'
N8	8	Cristi Chirică
OF	7	Mihai Macovei (c)
BF	6	Kamil Sobota	(substituted off) 72'
RL	5	Marius Iftimiciuc	(substituted off) 63'
LL	4	Johannes van Heerden
TP	3	Gheorghe Gajion	(substituted off) 51'
HK	2	Ovidiu Cojocaru	(substituted off) 51'
LP	1	Vasile Balan	(substituted off) 58'
Replacements:
HK	16	Tudor Butnariu	(substituted on) 51'
PR	17	Mihai Lazăr	(substituted on) 58'
PR	18	Alexandru Gordaș	(substituted on) 51'
LK	19	Ionuț Mureșan	(substituted on) 63'
FL	20	Damian Strătilă	(substituted on) 72'
SH	21	Gabriel Rupanu	(substituted on) 65'
FH	22	Daniel Plai	(substituted on) 62'
WG	23	Robert Neagu	(substituted on) 74'
Coach:
(England) Andy Robinson

FB	15	Felipe Echeverry
RW	14	Baltazar Amaya
OC	13	Felipe Arcos Pérez	(substituted off) 74'
IC	12	Andrés Vilaseca (c)
LW	11	Gastón Mieres	(substituted off) 57'
FH	10	Felipe Berchesi
SH	9	Tomás Inciarte	(substituted off) 74'
N8	8	Manuel Diana	(substituted off) 65'
OF	7	Santiago Civetta
BF	6	Manuel Ardao
RL	5	Manuel Leindekar
LL	4	Ignacio Dotti	(substituted off) 64'
TP	3	Ignacio Péculo
HK	2	Germán Kessler	(substituted off) 60'
LP	1	Mateo Sanguinetti	(substituted off) 45'
Replacements:
HK	16	Guillermo Pujadas	(substituted on) 60'
PR	17	Matías Benítez	(substituted on) 45'
PR	18	Matías Franco
LK	19	Diego Magno	(substituted on) 64'
FL	20	Lucas Bianchi	(substituted on) 65'
SH	21	Santiago Álvarez	(substituted on) 74'
WG	22	Rodrigo Silva	(substituted on) 57'
WG	23	Juan Manuel Alonso	(substituted on) 74'
Coach:
(Argentina) Esteban Meneses

Assistant referees:
Adrien Marbot (France)
Jean Baptiste Nuchy (France)
Television match official:
Sean Brickell (Wales)|}

Notes:

- Florin Surugiu (Romania) earned his 100th test cap.

13 November 2022
14:00 GMT (UTC+0)

Barbarians	35–31	All Blacks XV
Try: Mercer 15' c Tagitagivalu 30' c Marchant 36' c Thomas 51' c Webb 59' c Con: Hastoy (4/4) 17', 31', 37', 52'; West (1/1) 61'	Report	Try: Heem 5' m Dickson 10' m Nankivell 34' c Stevenson 45' c Sullivan 72' c Con: McKenzie (3/5) 35', 46', 73'

Tottenham Hotspur Stadium, Tottenham
Attendance: 35,000
Referee: Luke Pearce (England)

13 November 2022
14:15 GMT (UTC+0)

Scotland	23–31	New Zealand
Try: Penalty try 11'; Graham 13' c Con: Russell (1/1) 15'; Pen: Russell (3/3) 30', 42', 53'	Report	Try: Taukei'aho 2' c Tele'a (2) 6' c, 74' c S. Barrett 65' c Con: J. Barrett (4/4) 3', 8', 66', 76'; Pen: J. Barrett (1/1) 62'

Murrayfield Stadium, Edinburgh
Attendance: 67,144
Referee: Frank Murphy (Ireland)

Team details

FB	15	Stuart Hogg
RW	14	Darcy Graham
OC	13	Chris Harris		(substituted off) 64'
IC	12	Sione Tuipulotu		(substituted off) 76'
LW	11	Duhan van der Merwe
FH	10	Finn Russell
SH	9	Ali Price		(substituted off) 64'
N8	8	Matt Fagerson
OF	7	Hamish Watson		(substituted off) 17'
BF	6	Jamie Ritchie (c)
RL	5	Grant Gilchrist		(substituted off) 64'
LL	4	Richie Gray
TP	3	Zander Fagerson		(substituted off) 58'
HK	2	Fraser Brown		(substituted off) 70'
LP	1	Pierre Schoeman		(substituted off) 56'	(substituted on) 64'
Replacements:
HK	16	Ewan Ashman		(substituted on) 70'
PR	17	Rory Sutherland		(substituted on) 56'	(substituted off) 64'
PR	18	WP Nel		(substituted on) 58'
LK	19	Jonny Gray		(substituted on) 64'
N8	20	Jack Dempsey	(yellow card) 64' to 74'	(substituted on) 17'
SH	21	Ben White		(substituted on) 64'
FH	22	Blair Kinghorn		(substituted on) 76'
CE	23	Mark Bennett		(substituted on) 64'
Coach:
(Scotland) Gregor Townsend

FB	15	Jordie Barrett
RW	14	Mark Tele'a
OC	13	Anton Lienert-Brown	(yellow card) 11' to 21'
IC	12	David Havili		(substituted off) 53'
LW	11	Caleb Clarke
FH	10	Beauden Barrett		(substituted off) 78'
SH	9	Finlay Christie		(substituted off) 56'
N8	8	Ardie Savea
OF	7	Dalton Papali'i
BF	6	Akira Ioane		(substituted off) 59'
RL	5	Scott Barrett		(substituted off) 70'
LL	4	Sam Whitelock (c)
TP	3	Nepo Laulala		(substituted off) 51'
HK	2	Samisoni Taukei'aho		(substituted off) 56'
LP	1	Ethan de Groot		(substituted off) 51'
Replacements:
HK	16	Codie Taylor		(substituted on) 56'
PR	17	George Bower		(substituted on) 51'
PR	18	Fletcher Newell		(substituted on) 51'
FL	19	Tupou Vaa'i		(substituted on) 70'
FL	20	Shannon Frizell		(substituted on) 59'
SH	21	TJ Perenara		(substituted on) 56'
FH	22	Stephen Perofeta		(substituted on) 78'
CE	23	Rieko Ioane		(substituted on) 54'
Coach:
(New Zealand) Ian Foster

Player of the Match:
Dalton Papali'i (New Zealand)

Assistant referees:
Andrew Brace (Ireland)
Chris Busby (Ireland)
Television match official:
Tom Foley (England)

Notes:

- Mark Tele'a (New Zealand) made his international debut.

This match marked the start of Kevin Sinfield's seven ultramarathons in seven days challenge which finished on 19 November at the 2021 Men's Rugby League World Cup final.

=== 19/20 November ===
19 November 2022
12:45 EET (UTC+2)

Tonga	43–19	Uruguay
Try: Funaki 8' c Fifita 16' c Pulu 25' c Taumoepeau 35' m Tameifuna 56' m F. Paea 69' c Sakalia 73' m Con: W. Havili (3/5) 9', 17', 26'; Mausia (1/2) 71'	Report	Try: Vilaseca 19' m Penalty try 32'; Amaya 66' c Con: Echeverry (1/2) 67'

Stadionul Arcul de Triumf, Bucharest, Romania
Referee: Craig Evans (Wales)

Team details

FB	15	Afusipa Taumoepeau		(substituted off) 69'
RW	14	Solomone Kata
OC	13	Malakai Fekitoa
IC	12	George Moala	(yellow card) 48' to 58'
LW	11	Anzelo Tuitavuki		(substituted off) 50'
FH	10	William Havili		(substituted off) 64'	(substituted on) 69'
SH	9	Augustine Pulu		(substituted off) 70'
N8	8	Zane Kapeli	(yellow card) 66' to 76'	(substituted off) 34'	(substituted on) 44'
OF	7	Solomone Funaki		(substituted off) 42'
BF	6	Vaea Fifita
RL	5	Tanginoa Halaifonua
LL	4	Leva Fifita		(substituted off) 63'
TP	3	Ben Tameifuna (c)	(yellow card) 32' to 44'	(substituted off) 65'
HK	2	Sam Moli		(substituted off) 65'
LP	1	David Lolohea		(substituted off) 57'
Replacements:
HK	16	Sosefo Sakalia		(substituted on) 65'
PR	17	Tau Koloamatangi		(substituted on) 57'
PR	18	Joe Apikotoa		(substituted on) 34'	(substituted off) 44'	(substituted on) 65'
LK	19	Steve Mafi		(substituted on) 63'
FL	20	Sione Havili Talitui		(substituted on) 42'
SH	21	Manu Paea		(substituted on) 70'
FH	22	Otumaka Mausia		(substituted on) 64'
CE	23	Fetuli Paea		(substituted on) 50'
Coach:
(Australia) Toutai Kefu

FB	15	Rodrigo Silva		(substituted off) 73'
RW	14	Baltazar Amaya
OC	13	Felipe Arcos Pérez
IC	12	Andrés Vilaseca (c)
LW	11	Juan Manuel Alonso	(red card) 69'
FH	10	Felipe Echeverry
SH	9	Tomás Inciarte		(substituted off) 71'
N8	8	Manuel Ardao
OF	7	Santiago Civetta		(substituted off) 63'
BF	6	Lucas Bianchi		(substituted off) 54'
RL	5	Eric Dosantos		(substituted off) 52'
LL	4	Ignacio Dotti		(substituted off) 59'
TP	3	Ignacio Péculo
HK	2	Guillermo Pujadas		(substituted off) 42'
LP	1	Mateo Sanguinetti		(substituted off) 69'
Replacements:
HK	16	Germán Kessler		(substituted on) 42'
PR	17	Juan Echeverría		(substituted on) 69'
PR	18	Reinaldo Piussi		(substituted on) 73'
LK	19	Diego Magno		(substituted on) 52'
LK	20	Felipe Aliaga		(substituted on) 59'
FL	21	Manuel Diana		(substituted on) 54'
SH	22	Santiago Álvarez		(substituted on) 63'
FH	23	Juan Zuccarino		(substituted on) 71'
Coach:
(Argentina) Esteban Meneses

Assistant referees:
Luc Ramos (France)
Anthony Woodthorpe (England)
Television match official:
Sean Brickell (Wales)|}

Notes:

- Reinaldo Piussi (Uruguay) made his international debut.
- This was the first game between these two nations.

19 November 2022
14:30 CET (UTC+1)

Canada	37–43	Namibia
Try: Quattrin (2) 10' c, 49' c Thomas (2) 18' c, 28' c Con: Coats (4/4) 11', 19', 29', 50'; Pen: Coats (3/3) 2', 66', 77'	Report	Try: A. Ludick 7' c Ludwig 22' m Van der Westhuizen (2) 37' c, 72' m Deysel 39' m Van den Berg 63' m Kisting 80+1' c Con: Loubser (2/4) 8', 38'; Kisting (2/3) 73', 80+2'

NRCA Stadium, Amsterdam, Netherlands
Referee: Jordan Way (Australia)

Team details

FB	15	Cooper Coats
RW	14	Andrew Coe	(substituted off) 66'
OC	13	Ben LeSage (c)
IC	12	Josh Thiel
LW	11	Josiah Morra	(substituted off) 52'
FH	10	Robbie Povey
SH	9	Jason Higgins	(substituted off) 59'
N8	8	Siaki Vikilani
OF	7	Lucas Rumball (c)	(substituted off) 78'
BF	6	Corey Thomas	(substituted off) 62'
RL	5	Josh Larsen
LL	4	Conor Keys
TP	3	Tyler Rowland	(substituted off) 68'
HK	2	Andrew Quattrin	(substituted off) 68'
LP	1	Djustice Sears-Duru
Replacements:
HK	16	Lindsey Stevens	(substituted on) 68'
PR	17	Foster DeWitt
PR	18	Kyle Steeves	(substituted on) 68'
LK	19	Piers von Dadelszen	(substituted on) 62'
FL	20	Owain Ruttan	(substituted on) 78'
SH	21	Ross Braude	(substituted on) 59'
WG	22	David Richard	(substituted on) 66'
WG	23	Brock Webster	(substituted on) 52'
Coach:
(Wales) Kingsley Jones

FB	15	André van den Berg
RW	14	Warren Ludwig
OC	13	Johan Deysel (c)
IC	12	Le Roux Malan
LW	11	Darryl Wellman
FH	10	Cliven Loubser	(substituted off) 56'
SH	9	TC Kisting
N8	8	Prince ǃGaoseb	(substituted off) 61'
OF	7	Johan Retief
BF	6	Wian Conradie	(substituted off) 61'
RL	5	Max Katjijeko
LL	4	Adriaan Ludick	(substituted off) 52'
TP	3	Casper Viviers	(substituted off) 52'
HK	2	Louis van der Westhuizen
LP	1	Jason Benade
Replacements:
HK	16	Wicus Jacobs
PR	17	Jano Otto	(substituted on) 52'
PR	18	Chemigan Beukes
LK	19	Adriaan Booysen	(substituted on) 61'
FL	20	P. J. van Lill	(substituted on) 52'
SH	21	Damian Stevens	(substituted on) 56'
FL	22	Richard Hardwick	(substituted on) 61'
FH	23	P. W. Steenkamp
Coach:
(South Africa) Allister Coetzee

Assistant referees:
Ludovic Cayre (France)
Benoit Rousselet (France)
Television match official:
Philippe Bonhoure (France)

Notes:

- Namibia recorded their first ever victory over Canada.
- Kyle Steeves, Owain Ruttan (both Canada), Richard Hardwick and Darryl Wellman (both Namibia) made their international debuts.

19 November 2022
14:00 CET (UTC+1)

Italy	21–63	South Africa
Try: Capuozzo 11' c L. Cannone 66' m Con: Allan (1/2) 13'; Pen: Allan (3/3) 8', 21', 45'	Report	Try: Arendse (2) 1' m, 47' c Mbonambi 29' c Kolbe 44' m Smith 54' c Marx 62' m Kitshoff 68' m Willemse 72' c Reinach 78' c Con: Kolbe (1/2) 31'; Libbok (5/6) 50', 56', 70', 74', 80+1'; Pen: Kolbe (2/2) 10', 26'

Stadio Luigi Ferraris, Genoa
Attendance: 26,457
Referee: Matthew Carley (England)

Team details

FB	15	Ange Capuozzo
RW	14	Pierre Bruno	(substituted off) 71'
OC	13	Ignacio Brex
IC	12	Luca Morisi	(substituted off) 51'
LW	11	Monty Ioane
FH	10	Tommaso Allan
SH	9	Stephen Varney	(substituted off) 61'
N8	8	Lorenzo Cannone
OF	7	Michele Lamaro (c)
BF	6	Sebastian Negri	(substituted off) 51'
RL	5	Federico Ruzza	(substituted off) 68'
LL	4	Niccolò Cannone
TP	3	Pietro Ceccarelli	(substituted off) 40'
HK	2	Giacomo Nicotera	(substituted off) 40'
LP	1	Danilo Fischetti	(substituted off) 51'
Replacements:
HK	16	Gianmarco Lucchesi	(substituted on) 40'
PR	17	Ivan Nemer	(substituted on) 51'
PR	18	Simone Ferrari	(substituted on) 40'
LK	19	David Sisi	(substituted on) 68'
FL	20	Manuel Zuliani	(substituted on) 51'
SH	21	Alessandro Garbisi	(substituted on) 61'
FB	22	Edoardo Padovani	(substituted on) 71'
CE	23	Tommaso Menoncello	(substituted on) 51'
Coach:
(New Zealand) Kieran Crowley

FB	15	Willie le Roux
RW	14	Cheslin Kolbe	(substituted off) 47'
OC	13	Damian de Allende
IC	12	André Esterhuizen
LW	11	Kurt-Lee Arendse
FH	10	Damian Willemse
SH	9	Faf de Klerk	(substituted off) 69'
N8	8	Jasper Wiese	(substituted off) 61'
BF	7	Franco Mostert
OF	6	Siya Kolisi (c)
RL	5	Marvin Orie	(substituted off) 51'
LL	4	Salmaan Moerat	(substituted off) 43'
TP	3	Frans Malherbe	(substituted off) 50'
HK	2	Bongi Mbonambi	(substituted off) 50'
LP	1	Ox Nché	(substituted off) 50'
Replacements:
HK	16	Malcolm Marx	(substituted on) 50'
PR	17	Steven Kitshoff	(substituted on) 50'
PR	18	Vincent Koch	(substituted on) 50'
LK	19	Eben Etzebeth	(substituted on) 43'
FL	20	Kwagga Smith	(substituted on) 51'
FL	21	Evan Roos	(substituted on) 61'
SH	22	Cobus Reinach	(substituted on) 69'
FH	23	Manie Libbok	(substituted on) 47'
Coach:
(South Africa) Jacques Nienaber

Player of the Match:
Kurt-Lee Arendse (South Africa)

Assistant referees:
Wayne Barnes (England)
Sam Grove-White (Scotland)
Television match official:
Eric Gauzins (France)

Notes:

- South Africa recorded their biggest away victory over Italy (excluding their meeting in the 2019 Rugby World Cup, which took place in a neutral venue).

19 November 2022
13:00 GMT (UTC+0)

Wales	12–13	Georgia
Try: Morgan (2) 20' c, 24' m Con: Priestland (1/2) 21'	Report	Try: Todua 59' c Con: Abzhandadze (1/1) 60'; Pen: Abzhandadze (1/2) 2'; Matkava (1/1) 78'

Millennium Stadium, Cardiff
Attendance: 63,585
Referee: Andrea Piardi (Italy)

Team details

FB	15	Louis Rees-Zammit
RW	14	Alex Cuthbert	(yellow card) 52' to 62'
OC	13	George North
IC	12	Owen Watkin
LW	11	Josh Adams		(substituted off) 63'
FH	10	Rhys Priestland		(substituted off) 61'
SH	9	Tomos Williams
N8	8	Josh Macleod		(substituted off) 52'
OF	7	Justin Tipuric (c)
BF	6	Jac Morgan
RL	5	Adam Beard
LL	4	Ben Carter		(substituted off) 59'
TP	3	Dillon Lewis		(substituted off) 45'
HK	2	Ken Owens		(substituted off) 69'
LP	1	Gareth Thomas		(substituted off) 61'
Replacements:
HK	16	Bradley Roberts		(substituted on) 69'
PR	17	Rhodri Jones		(substituted on) 61'
PR	18	Sam Wainwright		(substituted on) 45'
LK	19	Dafydd Jenkins		(substituted on) 59'
N8	20	Taulupe Faletau		(substituted on) 52'
SH	21	Dane Blacker
FH	22	Sam Costelow		(substituted on) 61'
FB	23	Leigh Halfpenny		(substituted on) 63'
Coach:
(New Zealand) Wayne Pivac

FB	15	Davit Niniashvili
RW	14	Mirian Modebadze	(substituted off) 59'
OC	13	Demur Tapladze
IC	12	Merab Sharikadze (c)
LW	11	Alexander Todua
FH	10	Tedo Abzhandadze	(substituted off) 72'
SH	9	Vasil Lobzhanidze
N8	8	Tornike Jalaghonia
OF	7	Beka Saghinadze
BF	6	Beka Gorgadze
RL	5	Konstantin Mikautadze	(substituted off) 64'
LL	4	Nodar Cheishvili
TP	3	Guram Papidze	(substituted off) 68'
HK	2	Giorgi Chkoidze	(substituted off) 57'
LP	1	Guram Gogichashvili	(substituted off) 59'
Replacements:
HK	16	Shalva Mamukashvili	(substituted on) 57'
PR	17	Nika Abuladze	(substituted on) 59'
PR	18	Alexander Kuntelia	(substituted on) 68'
LK	19	Lado Chachanidze	(substituted on) 64'
FL	20	Sandro Mamamtavrishvili	(substituted on) 71'
SH	21	Luka Matkava	(substituted on) 73'
FH	22	Lasha Khmaladze	(substituted on) 59'
N8	23	Lasha Lomidze
Coach:
(Georgia (country)) Levan Maisashvili

Player of the Match:
Vasil Lobzhanidze (Georgia)

Assistant referees:
Pierre Brousset (France)
Gianluca Gnecchi (Italy)
Television match official:
Brendon Pickerill (New Zealand)

Notes:

- Georgia recorded their first win over Wales, and their first away victory against a Tier 1 nation.
- Dafydd Jenkins and Josh Macleod (both Wales) made their international debuts.
- Wales lost to a Tier 2 nation for the first time since their 23–8 loss to Japan during their 2013 tour. They also recorded their first home loss to a Tier 2 side since losing to Samoa by 26–19 in November 2012.

19 November 2022
16:45 EET (UTC+2)

Romania	0–22	Samoa
		Try: Seuteni 6'c Seu 13' c Toomaga-Allen 36' m Con: Toala (2/3) 7', 15'; Pen: Toala (1/1) 7'

Stadionul Arcul de Triumf, Bucharest
Referee: Christophe Ridley (England)

Team details

FB	15	Sioeli Lama
RW	14	Nicolas Onuțu
OC	13	Hinckley Vaovasa		(substituted off) 57'
IC	12	Fonovai Tangimana
LW	11	Atila Septar
FH	10	Tudor Boldor		(substituted off) 52'
SH	9	Florin Surugiu		(substituted off) 50'
N8	8	Cristi Chirică		(substituted off) 55'
OF	7	Dragoș Ser
BF	6	Mihai Macovei (c)
RL	5	Marius Iftimiciuc		(substituted off) 41'
LL	4	Florian Roșu
TP	3	Victor Leon		(substituted off) 41'
HK	2	Ovidiu Cojocaru		(substituted off) 41'
LP	1	Vasile Balan		(substituted off) 41'	(substituted on) 72'
Replacements:
HK	16	Tudor Butnariu		(substituted on) 41'
PR	17	Alexandru Savin		(substituted on) 41'
PR	18	Gheorghe Gajion		(substituted on) 41'	(substituted off) 72'
LK	19	Johannes van Heerden		(substituted on) 41'
FL	20	Kamil Sobota		(substituted on) 55'
SH	21	Gabriel Rupanu		(substituted on) 50'
FH	22	Vlăduț Popa	(yellow card) 80+3'	(substituted on) 52'
WG	23	Alexandru Bucur		(substituted on) 57'
Coach:
(England) Andy Robinson

FB	15	Danny Toala	(substituted off) 63'
RW	14	Alapati Leiua
OC	13	Stacey Ili	(substituted off) 58'
IC	12	Tumua Manu
LW	11	Nigel Ah Wong
FH	10	UJ Seuteni
SH	9	Jonathan Taumateine	(substituted off) 67'
N8	8	Jordan Taufua
OF	7	Tala Gray
BF	6	Taleni Seu	(substituted off) 43'
RL	5	Chris Vui (c)
LL	4	Brian Alainu'uese	(substituted off) 63'
TP	3	Jeffery Toomaga-Allen	(substituted off) 52'
HK	2	Seilala Lam	(substituted off) 55'
LP	1	Jordan Lay	(substituted off) 47'
Replacements:
HK	16	Luteru Tolai	(substituted on) 55'
PR	17	Donald Brighouse	(substituted on) 47'
PR	18	Michael Alaalatoa	(substituted on) 52'
N8	19	Piula Faʻasalele	(substituted on) 63'
FL	20	Afa Amosa	(substituted on) 43'
SH	21	Des Sepulona	(substituted on) 67'
CE	22	D'Angelo Leuila	(substituted on) 63'
WG	23	Joe Perez	(substituted on) 58'
Coach:
(Samoa) Seilala Mapusua

Assistant referees:
Eoghan Cross (Ireland)
Shota Tevzadze (Georgia)
Television match official:
Thomas Charabas (France)

Notes:

- Mihai Macovei (Romania) earned his 100th test cap. He also became the player with the highest number of caps (68) as captain of Romania.
- Des Sepulona (Samoa) made his international debut.

19 November 2022
15:00 CET (UTC+1)

French Barbarians	14–46	Fiji
Try: Roumat (1/1) 19' c Zegueur 44' c Con: Machenaud (2/2) 20', 45'	Report	Try: Nayacalevu 10' c Wainiqolo (2) 21' m, 63' m Habosi (2) 34' c, 80' m Ratuniyarawa 40' c Maqala 66' m Con: Volavola (4/7) 11', 35', 40+1', 67'; Pen: Volavola (1/1) 51'

Stade Pierre-Mauroy, Lille
Attendance: 18,762
Referee: Chris Busby (Ireland)

19 November 2022
15:15 GMT (UTC+0)

Scotland	52–29	Argentina
Try: Tuipulotu (2) 11' c, 55' c Van der Merwe 24' c Graham (3) 28' m, 42' m, 77' c Redpath 68' c Hogg 74' c Con: Russell (6/8) 12', 24', 56', 70', 75', 79'	Report	Try: De la Fuente (3) 16' m, 39' c, 80+7' c Boffelli 52' c Con: Boffelli (2/3) 40', 53'; Sanchez (1/1) 80+8'

Murrayfield Stadium, Edinburgh
Attendance: 61,811
Referee: Karl Dickson (England)

Team details

FB	15	Stuart Hogg
RW	14	Darcy Graham
OC	13	Chris Harris		(substituted off) 61'
IC	12	Sione Tuipulotu	(yellow card) 80+2' to end'
LW	11	Duhan van der Merwe		(substituted off) 71'
FH	10	Finn Russell
SH	9	Ali Price		(substituted off) 53'
N8	8	Jack Dempsey		(substituted off) 58'
OF	7	Jamie Ritchie (c)	(yellow card) 63' to 73'
BF	6	Matt Fagerson
RL	5	Grant Gilchrist		(substituted off) 75'
LL	4	Jonny Gray
TP	3	Zander Fagerson		(substituted off) 66'
HK	2	Fraser Brown		(substituted off) 58'
LP	1	Pierre Schoeman		(substituted off) 66'
Replacements:
HK	16	George Turner		(substituted on) 58'
PR	17	Jamie Bhatti		(substituted on) 66'
PR	18	Murphy Walker		(substituted on) 66'
LK	19	Glen Young		(substituted on) 75'
FL	20	Andy Christie		(substituted on) 58'
SH	21	Ben White		(substituted on) 53'
FH	22	Blair Kinghorn		(substituted on) 71'
CE	23	Cameron Redpath		(substituted on) 61'
Coach:
(Scotland) Gregor Townsend

FB	15	Juan Cruz Mallía
RW	14	Bautista Delguy		(substituted off) 63'
OC	13	Matías Orlando
IC	12	Jerónimo de la Fuente		(substituted off) 51'
LW	11	Emiliano Boffelli
FH	10	Santiago Carreras		(substituted off) 61'
SH	9	Gonzalo Bertranou		(substituted off) 77'
N8	8	Pablo Matera
OF	7	Marcos Kremer	(red card) 22'
BF	6	Juan Martín González
RL	5	Tomás Lavanini	(yellow card) 50' to 60'	(substituted off) 61'
LL	4	Matías Alemanno	(yellow card) 49' to 59'
TP	3	Eduardo Bello		(substituted off) 57'
HK	2	Julián Montoya (c)		(substituted off) 64'
LP	1	Thomas Gallo	(yellow card) 63' to 73'	(substituted off) 73'
Replacements:
HK	16	Ignacio Ruiz		(substituted on) 64'
PR	17	Nahuel Tetaz Chaparro		(substituted on) 63'
PR	18	Santiago Medrano		(substituted on) 57'
LK	19	Lucas Paulos		(substituted on) 51'
FL	20	Facundo Isa		(substituted on) 73'
SH	21	Lautaro Bazán		(substituted on) 77'
FH	22	Nicolás Sánchez		(substituted on) 61'
CE	23	Matías Moroni		(substituted on) 61'
Coach:
(Australia) Michael Cheika

Player of the Match:
Finn Russell (Scotland)

Assistant referees:
Luke Pearce (England)
Ian Tempest (England)
Television match official:
Brett Cronan (Australia)

Notes:

- Scotland recorded their biggest points total against Argentina, exceeding 50 points for the first time in 22 matches between the two nations.

19 November 2022
17:30 GMT (UTC+0)

England	25–25	New Zealand
Try: Stuart (2) 72' m, 79' c Steward 74' c Con: Smith (2/3) 75', 80'; Pen: Farrell (1/1) 26'; Smith (1/1) 42'	Report	Try: Papali'i 4' c Taylor 9' c Ioane 50' m Con: J. Barrett (2/3) 5', 10'; Pen: J. Barrett (1/1) 40+2'; Drop: B. Barrett (1/1) 70'

Twickenham Stadium, London
Attendance: 81,367
Referee: Mathieu Raynal (France)

Team details

FB	15	Freddie Steward
RW	14	Jack Nowell	(substituted off) 68'
OC	13	Manu Tuilagi	(substituted off) 54'
IC	12	Owen Farrell (c)
LW	11	Jonny May
FH	10	Marcus Smith
SH	9	Jack van Poortvliet	(substituted off) 54'
N8	8	Billy Vunipola
OF	7	Tom Curry
BF	6	Sam Simmonds	(substituted off) 67'
RL	5	Jonny Hill	(substituted off) 65'
LL	4	Maro Itoje
TP	3	Kyle Sinckler	(substituted off) 56'
HK	2	Luke Cowan-Dickie	(substituted off) 56'
LP	1	Ellis Genge	(substituted off) 56'
Replacements:
HK	16	Jamie George	(substituted on) 56'
PR	17	Mako Vunipola	(substituted on) 56'
PR	18	Will Stuart	(substituted on) 56'
LK	19	David Ribbans	(substituted on) 65'
FL	20	Jack Willis	(substituted on) 67'
SH	21	Ben Youngs	(substituted on) 54'
CE	22	Guy Porter	(substituted on) 68'
CE	23	Henry Slade	(substituted on) 54'
Coach:
(Australia) Eddie Jones

FB	15	Beauden Barrett	(yellow card) 72' to end'
RW	14	Mark Tele'a
OC	13	Rieko Ioane
IC	12	Jordie Barrett
LW	11	Caleb Clarke		(substituted off) 73'
FH	10	Richie Mo'unga
SH	9	Aaron Smith		(substituted off) 63'
N8	8	Ardie Savea
OF	7	Dalton Papali'i		(substituted off) 73'
BF	6	Scott Barrett		(substituted off) 68'
RL	5	Sam Whitelock (c)
LL	4	Brodie Retallick
TP	3	Tyrel Lomax		(substituted off) 58'
HK	2	Codie Taylor		(substituted off) 58'
LP	1	Ethan de Groot		(substituted off) 61'
Replacements:
HK	16	Samisoni Taukei'aho		(substituted on) 58'
PR	17	George Bower		(substituted on) 61'
PR	18	Nepo Laulala		(substituted on) 58'
FL	19	Shannon Frizell		(substituted on) 68'
FL	20	Hoskins Sotutu		(substituted on) 73'
SH	21	TJ Perenara		(substituted on) 63'
CE	22	David Havili
CE	23	Anton Lienert-Brown		(substituted on) 73'
Coach:
(New Zealand) Ian Foster

Player of the Match:
Richie Mo'unga (New Zealand)

Assistant referees:
Damon Murphy (Australia)
Nika Amashukeli (Georgia)
Television match official:
Brian MacNeice (Ireland)

Notes:

- Owen Farrell (England) became the third Englishman to earn 100 test caps.
- Brodie Retallick (New Zealand) became the 12th All Black to earn 100th test caps.
- This was only the second draw between England and New Zealand in history, and the first since December 1997.
- New Zealand retained the Hillary Shield.

19 November 2022
20:00 WET (UTC+0)

Ireland	13–10	Australia
Try: Aki 66' c Con: Crowley (1/1) 67'; Pen: Crowley (1/1) 10'; Byrne (1/1) 76'	Report	Try: Petaia 70' c Con: Foley (1/1) 72'; Pen: Foley (1/1) 56'

Aviva Stadium, Dublin
Attendance: 51,000
Referee: Ben O'Keeffe (New Zealand)

Team details

FB	15	Hugo Keenan
RW	14	Mack Hansen
OC	13	Garry Ringrose
IC	12	Stuart McCloskey	(substituted off) 54'
LW	11	Jimmy O'Brien
FH	10	Jack Crowley	(substituted off) 72'
SH	9	Jamison Gibson-Park	(substituted off) 63'
N8	8	Caelan Doris
OF	7	Josh van der Flier
BF	6	Peter O'Mahony (c)	(substituted off) 50'
RL	5	James Ryan
LL	4	Tadhg Beirne	(substituted off) 60'
TP	3	Tadhg Furlong	(substituted off) 63'
HK	2	Dan Sheehan	(substituted off) 72'
LP	1	Andrew Porter	(substituted off) 72'
Replacements:
HK	16	Rob Herring	(substituted on) 72'
PR	17	Cian Healy	(substituted on) 72'
PR	18	Finlay Bealham	(substituted on) 63'
LK	19	Joe McCarthy	(substituted on) 60'
N8	20	Jack Conan	(substituted on) 50'
SH	21	Craig Casey	(substituted on) 63'
FH	22	Ross Byrne	(substituted on) 72'
CE	23	Bundee Aki	(substituted on) 54'
Coach:
(England) Andy Farrell

FB	15	Andrew Kellaway
RW	14	Mark Nawaqanitawase
OC	13	Len Ikitau
IC	12	Hunter Paisami		(substituted off) 4'
LW	11	Tom Wright
FH	10	Bernard Foley
SH	9	Nic White		(substituted off) 60'
N8	8	Rob Valetini		(substituted off) 37'	(substituted on) 47'
OF	7	Michael Hooper
BF	6	Jed Holloway
RL	5	Cadeyrn Neville		(substituted off) 53'
LL	4	Nick Frost
TP	3	Allan Alaalatoa				(substituted off) 54'
HK	2	Dave Porecki		(substituted off) 24'
LP	1	James Slipper (c)		(substituted off) 77'
Replacements:
HK	16	Folau Fainga'a	(yellow card) 37' to 47'	(substituted on) 24'
PR	17	Tom Robertson		(substituted on) 77'
PR	18	Taniela Tupou		(substituted on) 37'	(substituted off) 47'	(substituted on) 54'
LK	19	Will Skelton		(substituted on) 53'
FL	20	Pete Samu		(substituted on) 49'
SH	21	Jake Gordon		(substituted on) 60'
FH	22	Noah Lolesio
CE	23	Jordan Petaia		(substituted on) 4'
Coach:
(New Zealand) Dave Rennie

Player of the Match:
Josh van der Flier (Ireland)

Assistant referees:
James Doleman (New Zealand)
Tual Trainini (France)
Television match official:
Stuart Terheege (England)

Notes:

- Joe McCarthy (Ireland) made his international debut.

20 November 2022
14:00 CET (UTC+1)

France	35–17	Japan
Try: Penaud (2) 7' m, 60' c Ollivon 35' c Jelonch 73' c Con: Ramos (3/4) 37', 62', 74'; Pen: Ramos (3/3) 13', 17', 31'	Report	Try: Saito (2) 42' c, 63' c Con: Lee (2/2) 43', 65'; Pen: Lee (1/1) 21'

Stadium de Toulouse, Toulouse
Attendance: 32,000
Referee: Andrew Brace (Ireland)

Team details

FB	15	Thomas Ramos
RW	14	Damian Penaud
OC	13	Gaël Fickou	(substituted off) 16'
IC	12	Jonathan Danty
LW	11	Yoram Moefana
FH	10	Romain Ntamack	(substituted off) 57'
SH	9	Maxime Lucu	(substituted off) 70'
N8	8	Grégory Alldritt
OF	7	Charles Ollivon (c)
BF	6	Anthony Jelonch
RL	5	Romain Taofifénua	(substituted off) 59'
LL	4	Cameron Woki	(substituted off) 75'
TP	3	Uini Atonio	(substituted off) 46'
HK	2	Julien Marchand	(substituted off) 59'
LP	1	Reda Wardi	(substituted off) 62'
Replacements:
HK	16	Peato Mauvaka	(substituted on) 59'
PR	17	Dany Priso	(substituted on) 62'
PR	18	Sipili Falatea	(substituted on) 46'
LK	19	Florian Verhaeghe	(substituted on) 75'
LK	20	Bastien Chalureau	(substituted on) 59'
FL	21	Sekou Macalou	(substituted on) 16'
SH	22	Baptiste Couilloud	(substituted on) 70'
FH	23	Matthieu Jalibert	(substituted on) 57'
Coach:
(France) Fabien Galthié

FB	15	Ryohei Yamanaka	(substituted off) 76'
RW	14	Dylan Riley
OC	13	Shogo Nakano
IC	12	Ryoto Nakamura	(substituted off) 54'
LW	11	Siosaia Fifita
FH	10	Lee Seung-sin
SH	9	Naoto Saito	(substituted off) 51'
N8	8	Kazuki Himeno	(substituted off) 51'
OF	7	Pieter Labuschagne
BF	6	Michael Leitch
RL	5	Jack Cornelsen
LL	4	Warner Dearns	(substituted off) 75'
TP	3	Koo Ji-won	(substituted off) 76'
HK	2	Atsushi Sakate (c)	(substituted off) 76'
LP	1	Keita Inagaki	(substituted off) 57'
Replacements:
HK	16	Kosuke Horikoshi	(substituted on) 76'
PR	17	Craig Millar	(substituted on) 57'
PR	18	Shuhei Takeuchi	(substituted on) 76'
LK	19	Wimpie van der Walt	(substituted on) 75'
N8	20	Tevita Tatafu	(substituted on) 51'
SH	21	Yutaka Nagare	(substituted on) 51'
FH	22	Hayata Nakao	(substituted on) 76'
WG	23	Kotaro Matsushima	(substituted on) 54'
Coach:
(New Zealand) Jamie Joseph

Player of the Match:
Julien Marchand (France)

Assistant referees:
Frank Murphy (Ireland)
Chris Busby (Ireland)
Television match official:
Tom Foley (England)

Notes:

- France finished 2022 unbeaten, becoming only the third team to win all their games in an entire calendar year; after New Zealand in 2013, and England in 2016.

=== 26 November ===
26 November 2022
15:15 GMT (UTC+0)

Wales	34–39	Australia
Try: Morgan (2) 10' c, 47' c Faletau 23' c Dyer 52' c Con: Anscombe (4/4) 11', 23', 48', 54'; Pen: Anscombe (2/2) 19', 28'	Report	Try: Fainga'a 34' c Nawaqanitawase (2) 58' m, 68' c Penalty try 74'; Lonergan 78' c Con: Donaldson (1/1) 35'; Lolesio (2/3) 69', 79'; Pen: Donaldson (2/2) 4', 15'

Millennium Stadium, Cardiff
Attendance: 67,401
Referee: Matthew Carley (England)

Team details

FB	15	Josh Adams
RW	14	Alex Cuthbert			(substituted off) 75'
OC	13	George North
IC	12	Joe Hawkins
LW	11	Rio Dyer
FH	10	Gareth Anscombe		(substituted off) 55'
SH	9	Tomos Williams		(substituted off) 15'
N8	8	Taulupe Faletau		(substituted off) 72'
OF	7	Justin Tipuric (c)	(yellow card) 66' to 76'
BF	6	Jac Morgan
RL	5	Alun Wyn Jones		(substituted off) 72'
LL	4	Adam Beard
TP	3	Dillon Lewis		(substituted off) 59'
HK	2	Ken Owens		(substituted off) 65'	(substituted on) 75'
LP	1	Gareth Thomas		(substituted off) 68'
Replacements:
HK	16	Ryan Elias	(yellow card) 74'	(substituted on) 65'
PR	17	Rhodri Jones		(substituted on) 68'
PR	18	Tomas Francis		(substituted on) 59'
LK	19	Ben Carter		(substituted on) 72'
FL	20	Josh Macleod		(substituted on) 72'
SH	21	Kieran Hardy		(substituted on) 15'
FH	22	Rhys Priestland		(substituted on) 55'
FH	23	Sam Costelow
Coach:
(New Zealand) Wayne Pivac

FB	15	Tom Wright
RW	14	Jordan Petaia		(substituted off) 60'
OC	13	Len Ikitau
IC	12	Reece Hodge
LW	11	Mark Nawaqanitawase
FH	10	Ben Donaldson		(substituted off) 55'
SH	9	Jake Gordon	(yellow card) 38' to 48'	(substituted off) 54'
N8	8	Langi Gleeson		(substituted off) 51'
OF	7	Fraser McReight
BF	6	Jed Holloway
RL	5	Cadeyrn Neville		(substituted off) 55'
LL	4	Nick Frost
TP	3	Allan Alaalatoa		(substituted off) 71'
HK	2	Folau Fainga'a		(substituted off) 55'
LP	1	James Slipper (c)		(substituted off) 26'	(substituted on) 36'	(substituted off) 40'
Replacements:
HK	16	Lachlan Lonergan		(substituted on) 55'
PR	17	Tom Robertson	(yellow card) 45' to 55'	(substituted on) 26'	(substituted off) 36'	(substituted on) 40'
PR	18	Sam Talakai		(substituted on) 71'
LK	19	Ned Hanigan		(substituted on) 55'
FL	20	Pete Samu		(substituted on) 51'
SH	21	Tate McDermott		(substituted on) 54'
FH	22	Noah Lolesio		(substituted on) 55'
WG	23	Jock Campbell		(substituted on) 60'
Coach:
(New Zealand) Dave Rennie

Player of the Match:
Mark Nawaqanitawase (Australia)

Assistant referees:
Luke Pearce (England)
Chris Busby (Ireland)
Television match official:
Joy Neville (Ireland)

Notes:

- Leigh Halfpenny (Wales) had been named to start but withdrew in the warm-up and was replaced by Josh Adams. Sam Costelow replaced Adams on the bench.
- Taulupe Faletau (Wales) made his 100th international appearance (95 for Wales and 5 for the British and Irish Lions).
- Joe Hawkins (Wales) and Sam Talakai (Australia) made their international debuts.
- Australia reclaimed the James Bevan Trophy for the first time since 2017.
- Wales surrendered a record-breaking 21-point lead to eventually lose the game.

26 November 2022
17:30 GMT (UTC+0)

England	13–27	South Africa
Try: Slade 72' c Con: Farrell (1/1) 73'; Pen: Farrell (2/4) 14', 46'	Report	Try: Arendse 33' m Etzebeth 50' c Con: De Klerk (1/2) 50'; Pen: De Klerk (3/4) 19', 40', 58'; Drop: Willemse (2/2) 32', 42'

Twickenham Stadium, London
Attendance: 81,268
Referee: Angus Gardner (Australia)

Team details

FB	15	Freddie Steward
RW	14	Tommy Freeman		(substituted off) 40'
OC	13	Manu Tuilagi
IC	12	Owen Farrell (c)
LW	11	Jonny May
FH	10	Marcus Smith		(substituted off) 61'
SH	9	Jack van Poortvliet		(substituted off) 67'
N8	8	Billy Vunipola		(substituted off) 57'
OF	7	Tom Curry	(yellow card) 49' to 59'
BF	6	Alex Coles		(substituted off) 47'
RL	5	Jonny Hill
LL	4	Maro Itoje
TP	3	Kyle Sinckler		(substituted off) 40'	(substituted on) 76'
HK	2	Jamie George		(substituted off) 40'
LP	1	Mako Vunipola		(substituted off) 40'
Replacements:
HK	16	Luke Cowan-Dickie		(substituted on) 40'
PR	17	Ellis Genge		(substituted on) 40'
PR	18	Will Stuart		(substituted on) 40'	(substituted off) 76'
LK	19	David Ribbans		(substituted on) 47'
N8	20	Sam Simmonds		(substituted on) 57'
SH	21	Ben Youngs		(substituted on) 67'
CE	22	Henry Slade		(substituted on) 61'
WG	23	Jack Nowell		(substituted on) 40'
Coach:
(Australia) Eddie Jones

FB	15	Willie le Roux		(substituted off) 61'
RW	14	Kurt-Lee Arendse		(substituted off) 79'
OC	13	Jesse Kriel
IC	12	Damian de Allende
LW	11	Makazole Mapimpi			(substituted off) 63'
FH	10	Damian Willemse
SH	9	Faf de Klerk		(substituted off) 73'
N8	8	Evan Roos		(substituted off) 52'	(substituted on) 73'
BF	7	Franco Mostert
OF	6	Siya Kolisi (c)			(substituted off) 73'
RL	5	Marvin Orie		(substituted off) 46'
LL	4	Eben Etzebeth
TP	3	Frans Malherbe		(substituted off) 60'	(substituted on) 63'
HK	2	Bongi Mbonambi		(substituted off) 47'
LP	1	Ox Nché		(substituted off) 47'
Replacements:
HK	16	Malcolm Marx		(substituted on) 47'
PR	17	Steven Kitshoff		(substituted on) 47'
PR	18	Thomas du Toit	(red card) 61'	(substituted on) 60'
FL	19	Marco van Staden		(substituted on) 54'
FL	20	Kwagga Smith		(substituted on) 46'
SH	21	Jaden Hendrikse		(substituted on) 73'
FH	22	Manie Libbok		(substituted on) 61'
WG	23	Canan Moodie		(substituted on) 79'
Coach:
(South Africa) Jacques Nienaber

Player of the Match:
Franco Mostert (South Africa)

Assistant referees:
Andrew Brace (Ireland)
Pierre Brousset (France)
Television match official:
Ben Whitehouse (Wales)

Notes:

- Manu Tuilagi (England) earned his 50th test cap.

== See also ==
- 2022 July rugby union tests
- 2022 South Africa rugby union tour of Europe
- 2023 Rugby World Cup – Regional play-off and Final Qualification Tournament
