= Beka Gorgadze =

Georgian rugby union player (born 1996)

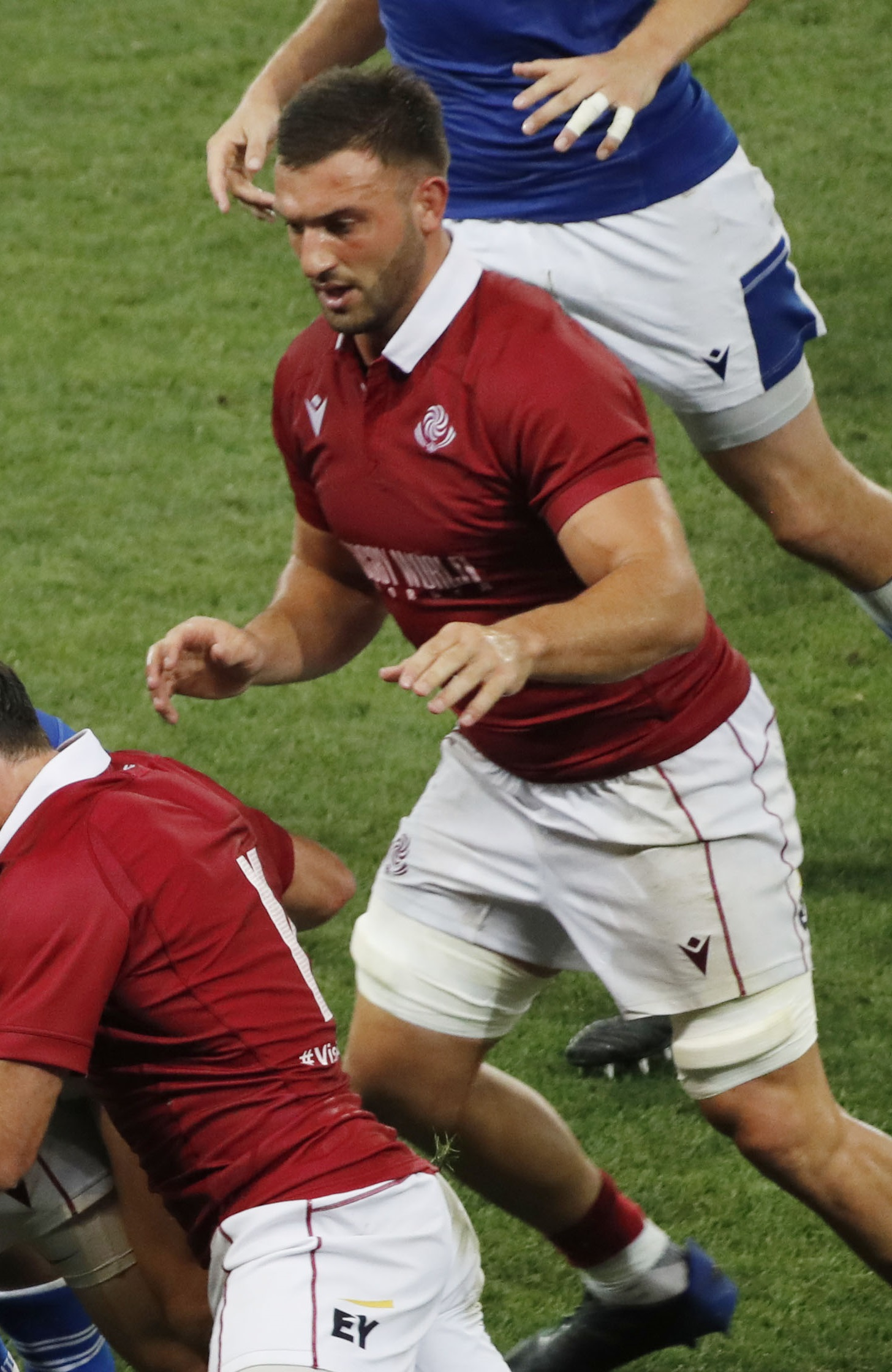
- Born: 8 February 1996 (age 30) Rustavi, Georgia
- Height: 1.89 m (6 ft 2 in)
- Weight: 110 kg (17 st 5 lb)

Rugby union career
- Position: Back row
Senior career
Years	Team	Apps	(Points)
2015–2017	Stade Montois	32	(25)
2018–2021	Bordeaux	40	(20)
2021–	Section Paloise	72	(65)
- Correct as of 3 July 2024
International career
Years	Team	Apps	(Points)
2015–2016	Georgia U20		
2016–	Georgia	45	(60)
- Correct as of 3 July 2024

Beka Gorgadze (Georgian: ბექა გორგაძე; born 8 February 1996) is a Georgian rugby union player, currently playing for Top 14 side Pau. His preferred position is number 8.

== Biography ==
=== Club career ===
Beka Gorgadze grew up in Rustavi, Georgia, near Tbilisi. Initially starting with football, he switched to rugby at the age of 8, joining RC Rustavi Kharebi. He later represented Georgia at various youth levels, including U16, U18, and U20.

In 2015, Gorgadze joined the academy of Stade Montois. On December 11, 2015, he played his first match in Pro D2 against US Carcassonne, at the age of 19. In his first professional season, he played 12 league matches. Beka Gorgadze then became French U23 Elite 2 champion at the end of the 2015–2016 season. During the 2016–2017 season, he played 20 Pro D2 matches and scored 4 tries. He scored his first professional try on January 13, 2017, at the Stade Armandie against SU Agen.

In April 2017, he signed with Union Bordeaux Bègles but stayed with Stade Montois for the 2017–2018 season. He did not play any matches during the 2017–2018 season due to an injury that kept him off the field for the entire season.

He played 14 matches in the Top 14 and 2 in the European Challenge Cup during the 2018–19 season with UBB. In the 2019–20 season, he only played 3 Top 14 matches and 4 Challenge Cup matches. During the 2020–2021 season, he got injured during a match with his national team and suffered a knee ligament rupture, ending his season in December 2020. He played only 2 league matches with UBB.

At the beginning of the 2021–22 Top 14 season, Beka Gorgadze moved further south to Pau. In Béarn, Gorgadze has firmly established himself as an essential leader at Section Paloise, assuming the role of captain for a squad composed of numerous promising young talents. With Section Paloise, Gorgadze now plays in the position of number 8, taking on the role of a ball carrier. He established himself as a key player in Sébastien Piqueronies' squad.

In April 2022, he extended his contract for 3 more seasons.

For the 2022–23 season, Beka Gorgadze was named captain of Section Paloise.

== International career ==
Beka Gorgadze has represented Georgia at various youth levels, including U16, U18, and U20.

In 2019, Gorgadze was selected by Georgia to compete in the World Cup in Japan, where he became his national team's first choice number 8.

In November 2022, Beka Gorgadze and his Georgian teammate at Section Paloise, Guram Papidze, were starters for the Georgia national rugby union team during the historic win against Wales at the Millennium Stadium in Cardiff.

Gorgadze, a key player and vice-captain for the Lelos injured his ankle during the 2023 Rugby World Cup match against Portugal (18-18), and was withdrawn from the squad for the ramindaer of the tournament. Otar Giorgadze has been selected as his replacement.
