= Pierre Bruno =

Italian rugby union player

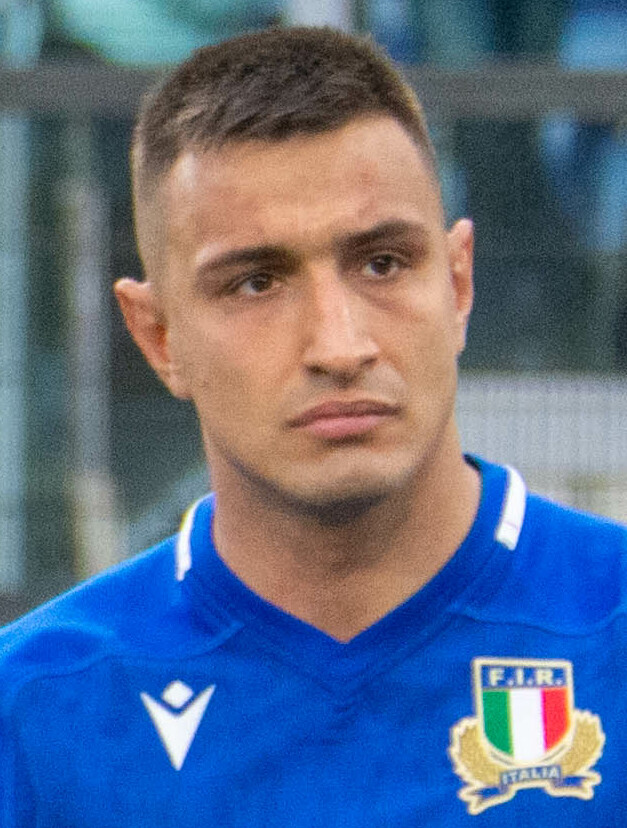
- Bruno in 2023
- Born: 28 June 1996 (age 30) Genoa, Italy
- Height: 181 cm (5 ft 11 in)
- Weight: 83 kg (183 lb; 13 st 1 lb)

Rugby union career
- Position: Wing
- Current team: Valorugby Emilia
Senior career
| Years | Team | Apps | (Points) |
| 2015 | Mogliano | 5 | (0) |
| 2016–2019 | Calvisano | 53 | (160) |
| 2017 | →Zebre Parma | 1 | (0) |
| 2019–2024 | Zebre Parma | 56 | (70) |
| 2024– | Valorugby Emilia | | |
- Correct as of 24 Dec 2022
International career
| Years | Team | Apps | (Points) |
| 2015–2016 | Italy U20 | 8 | (5) |
| 2017–2018 | Emerging Italy | 6 | (5) |
| 2021 | Italy A | 1 | (5) |
| 2021– | Italy | 15 | (25) |
- Correct as of 6 Oct 2023

Pierre Bruno (Italian pronunciation: [ˈbruːno]; born 28 June 1996) is an Italian professional rugby union player who primarily plays wing for Valorugby Emilia in the Serie A Elite.

== Professional career ==
Bruno has previously played for clubs such as Mogliano and Calvisano in the past. For 2017–18 Pro14 season, he named as Additional Player for Zebre. He played with Zebre Parma from summer 2019 to 2023–24 season.

In 2015 and 2016, Bruno was named in the Italy Under 20 squad and in 2017 and 2018 he was named in the Emerging Italy squad. On 8 November 2021 he was named in the Italy A squad for the 2021 end-of-year rugby union internationals.

On 31 October 2021, he was selected by Kieran Crowley to be part of an Italy 34-man squad for the 2021 end-of-year rugby union internationals. He made his debut for Italy on 20 November 2021 against Uruguay, scoring a try in Italy's 17–10 win.

Kieran Crowley selected Pierre Bruno also for the 2022 Six Nations Championship, but his debut in the tournament against Ireland was unfortunate, as he had to be replaced after only 20 minutes due to a controversial refereeing decision. Bruno was also in the Italian starting team that faced Scotland in Rome. The match ended in another defeat for Italy (22-33), but with signs of improvement.

Bruno had the opportunity to make up for it in November 2022 Autumn internationals, when he scored two tries in the sparkling victory of Italy over Samoa (49-17), and another try against Australia, a first ever win for the Italian team facing the Wallabies (28-27).

On 22 August 2023, he was named in the Italy's 33-man squad for the 2023 Rugby World Cup.

== Statistics ==
=== List of international test tries ===
As of 25 February 2022

| Try | Opposing team | Location | Venue | Competition | Date | Result | Score |
|---|---|---|---|---|---|---|---|
| 1 | Uruguay | Parma, Italy | Stadio Sergio Lanfranchi | 2021 November Internationals | 20 November 2021 | Win | 17 – 10 |
| 2 | Samoa | Padua, Italy | Stadio Plebiscito | 2022 November Internationals | 5 November 2022 | Win | 49 – 17 |
| 3 | Samoa | Padua, Italy | Stadio Plebiscito | 2022 November Internationals | 5 November 2022 | Win | 49 – 17 |
| 4 | Australia | Florence, Italy | Stadio Artemio Franchi | 2022 November Internationals | 12 November 2022 | Win | 28 – 27 |
| 5 | Ireland | Rome, Italy | Stadio Olimpico | 2023 Six Nations | 25 February 2023 | Loss | 20 – 34 |
