= Vakh Abdaladze =

Georgian rugby union player

Vakhtang Abdaladze
- Born: 6 February 1996 (age 30) Kutaisi, Georgia
- Height: 1.88 m (6 ft 2 in)
- Weight: 116 kg (18.3 st; 256 lb)
- School: Castleknock Community College
- University: Dublin City University

Rugby union career
- Position: Prop
Amateur team(s)
Years	Team	Apps	(Points)
2008–2015	Coolmine		
2015	Clontarf		
Senior career
Years	Team	Apps	(Points)
2017-23	Leinster	27	(15)
2023–	Brive	27	(10)
- Correct as of 18 Apr 2025
International career
Years	Team	Apps	(Points)
2016	Ireland U20	2	(0)
2022–	Georgia	3	(0)
- Correct as of 11 Feb 2023

Vakhtang Abdaladze (born 6 February 1996), is a rugby union player who plays as a tighthead prop. He currently plays for Brive in the Pro D2. Abdaladze was born in Georgia and raised in Ireland. He has played for Ireland U-20s and in 2022 was capped for Georgia senior men's team.

== Early life ==
Born in Kutaisi, Georgia, Abdaladze moved to Ireland with his family at the age of 5, where they settled in the Dublin suburb of Blanchardstown. Abdaladze was more interested in football than rugby for most of his childhood, but started playing rugby for Coolmine RFC at the age of 12 and was originally a centre. His father Nick coached him at u-17 level at Coolmine, himself having played number 8 for the Georgia national rugby union team.

After moving to Clontarf F.C., coaches there converted the young centre to his current position of prop, noticing he had the physical attributes required to play in the front row.

== Leinster Rugby ==
Having missed out on an academy place after leaving school, Abdaladze spent three years combining full-time studies in Dublin City University with the grind of the sub-academy. Eventually, strong performances in the AIL for Clontarf F.C. meant he was a late addition to the Leinster academy in the middle of the 2017–18 season, at the unusual age of nearly 22. Within weeks he had also made his debut for the senior team. Abdaladze was then awarded his first senior contract ahead of the 2018–19 season after spending less than a year in the academy. He scored a try against Zebre on his second appearance for the province.

== Ireland ==
Abdaladze was not selected for the Ireland U-20s for the 2016 Six Nations Under 20s Championship, but as with making the Leinster Rugby academy he was eventually rewarded for his efforts when being named in the Ireland squad for the 2016 World Rugby Under 20 Championship. Ireland achieved their best ever tournament placing of runners-up, eventually losing to the England U-20s in the final. Abdaladze was part of the side that beat the New Zealand U-20s for the first time ever at the tournament.

== Georgia ==
Abdaladze made his international debut for Georgia on 6 November 2022 coming on as a substitute against Uruguay in the 2022 end-of-year rugby union internationals.
