= Erdinci Septar =

Romanian rugby union player

- Born: Erdinci Septar; 12 February 1973 (age 53) Constanța, Romania
- Height: 6 ft 4 in (193 cm)
- Weight: 230 lb (104 kg)
- Notable relative: Atila Septar (son)

Rugby union career
- Position: No. 8
Senior career
Years	Team	Apps	(Points)
- Farul Constanța
- Limoges
- Saint-Junien
International career
Years	Team	Apps	(Points)
1996–2000	Romania	13	(15)

Erdinci Septar (Dobrujan Tatar: Erdinç Septar; born 12 February 1973 in Constanța) is a former Romanian rugby union football player. He played as a number eight but also as a flanker.

== Club career ==
He mostly played for Farul Constanța but also in France for Limoges and Saint-Junien.

== International career ==
Septar gathered 13 test caps for Romania, from his debut in 1996 to his last test in 2000. He scored 3 tries during his international career, 15 points on aggregate. He was a member of his national side for the 4th Rugby World Cups in 1999 playing in all three Pool E matches.

== Personal life ==
Erdinci Septar is the father of French-Romanian Rugby Union player, Atila Septar.
