= Atila Septar =

Romania international rugby union player

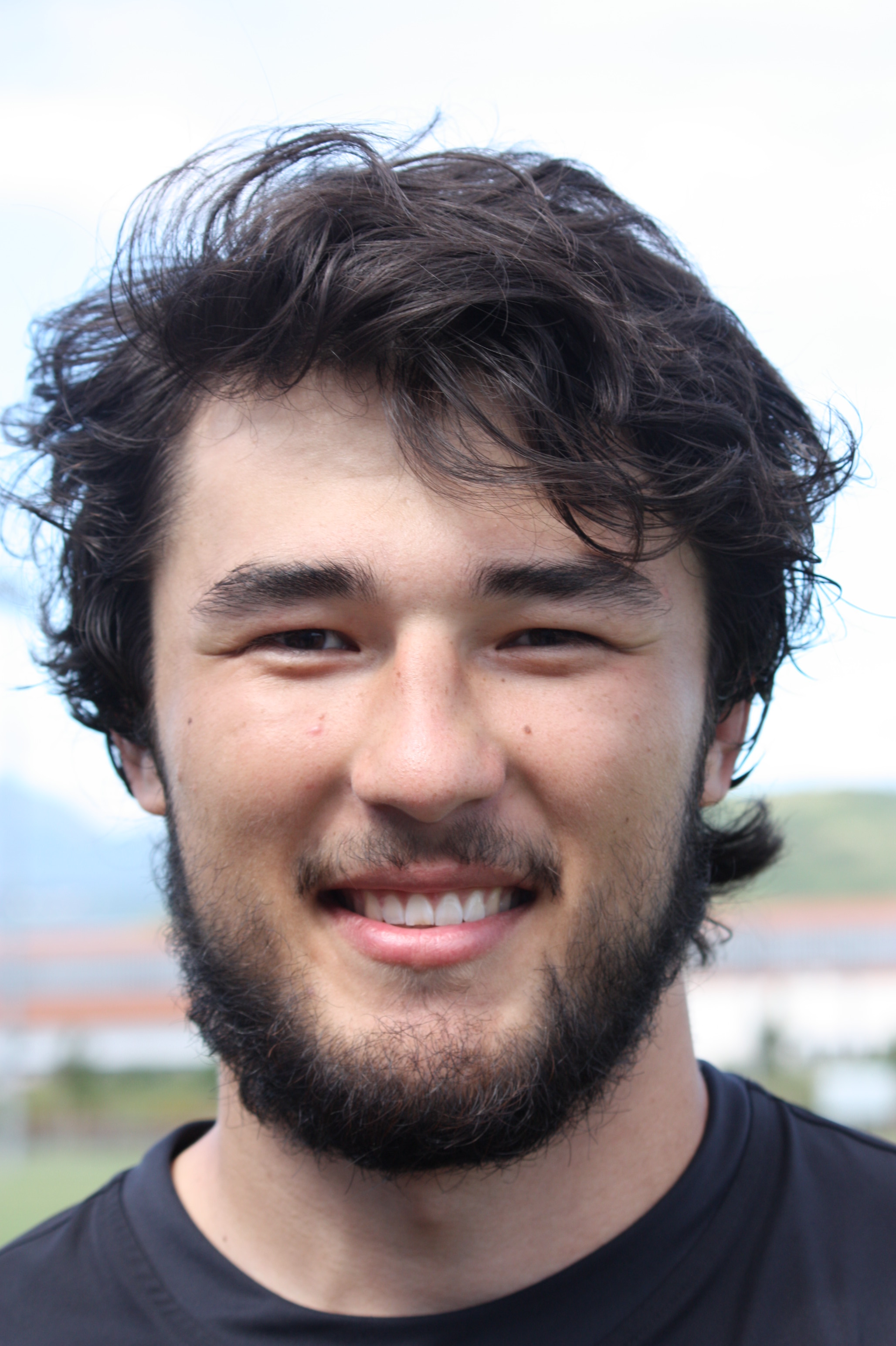
- Born: Atila Septar; 2 June 1996 (age 30) Constanța, Romania
- Height: 1.93 m (6 ft 4 in)
- Weight: 100 kg (220 lb)
- Notable relative: Erdinci Septar (father)

Rugby union career
- Position(s): Centre, wing
- Current team: Provence Rugby
Senior career
| Years | Team | Apps | (Points) |
| 2014–2016 | Brive | 6 | (5) |
| 2016–2018 | Clermont | 9 | (0) |
| 2018–2021 | Pau | 29 | (25) |
| 2021–2023 | Toulon | 16 | (0) |
| 2023– | Provence Rugby | 8 | (5) |
- Correct as of 7 December 2023
International career
| Years | Team | Apps | (Points) |
| 2016 | France U20 | 3 | (0) |
| 2022– | Romania | 5 | (5) |
- Correct as of 1 March 2023

Atila Septar (born 2 June 1996) is a French-Romanian rugby union football player. He plays as a centre or wing for Provence Rugby.

== Club career ==
Atila Septar played for CA Brive for two seasons then two more for Clermont then three years for Pau and two years for RC Toulon. He now plays for Pro D2 team Provence Rugby.

== International career ==
=== Junior career ===
Septar played for the France Under–20 rugby union team during the 2016 Six Nations Under 20s Championship playing in three matches.

=== Senior career ===
In October 2022, Atila was called for Romania's national team, the Oaks, making his international debut during Week 2 of the 2022 end-of-year rugby union internationals in a match against Chilean Los Cóndores. On this occasion he scored his first try for the national team.

== Personal life ==
Atila Septar is the son of Romanian former International Rugby Union player, Erdinci Septar.
