= Augusto Böhme =

Chilean rugby union player

- Full name: Augusto Böhme Alemparte
- Born: 11 June 1997 (age 29) Santiago, Chile
- Height: 175 cm (5 ft 9 in)
- Weight: 97 kg (214 lb; 15 st 4 lb)

Rugby union career
- Position: Hooker
- Current team: New Orleans Gold
Senior career
| Years | Team | Apps | (Points) |
| 2020–2021 | Selknam | | |
| 2022 | Seattle Seawolves | 1 | (0) |
| 2022 | → Dallas Jackals | 4 | (0) |
| 2023 | Selknam | 6 | (10) |
| 2024– | New Orleans Gold | | |
- Correct as of 17 March 2024
International career
| Years | Team | Apps | (Points) |
| 2019– | Chile | 25 | (15) |
- Correct as of 17 March 2024

Augusto Böhme (born 11 June 1997) is a Chilean rugby union player, currently playing for the New Orleans Gold in Major League Rugby (MLR). His preferred position is hooker. He competed in the 2023 Rugby World Cup.

== Early career ==
Böhme is from Santiago and plays his club rugby for Universidad Católica.

== Professional career ==
Böhme made his professional debut in 2020, playing for Selknam in the 2020 Súper Liga Americana de Rugby season, before also representing the side in 2021. He signed for the Seattle Seawolves for the 2022 Major League Rugby season, making one appearance before being loaned to the Dallas Jackals. He returned to Chile for 2023, rejoining Selknam for the 2023 Super Rugby Americas season.

Böhme made his international debut for Chile in 2019 against the United States. He made a further 20 appearances, before being named in the squad for the 2023 Rugby World Cup, making a further 3 appearances during the tournament.
