= Tengiz Peranidze =

Georgian rugby union player

- Full name: Tengiz Peranidze
- Born: 6 April 1998 (age 28)
- Height: 176 cm (5 ft 9 in)
- Weight: 78 kg (172 lb; 12 st 4 lb)

Rugby union career
- Position: Scrum-half
- Current team: Black Lion
Senior career
| Years | Team | Apps | (Points) |
| 20??-2021 | Lelo Saracens | ?? | (??) |
| 2021- | Black Lion | 28 | (30) |
- Correct as of 13 November 2023
International career
| Years | Team | Apps | (Points) |
| 2023- | Georgia | 1 | (0) |
- Correct as of 13 November 2023
National sevens team
| Years | Team | | Comps |
| 2017-2019 | Georgia | | 4 |
- Correct as of 13 November 2023

Tengiz Peranidze (born 6 April 1998) is a Georgian rugby union player who plays as a scrumhalf for Black Lion in the Rugby Europe Super Cup and the EPCR Challenge Cup.

== Club career ==
He joined Black Lion from Lelo Saracens in 2021, making his debut for the Georgian franchise coming off the bench in the first round of the 2021-22 Rugby Europe Super Cup.

He started and scored in the final against the Lusitanos.

== International career ==
He was called up to the Georgia squad due to an injured Gela Aprasidze, He made his debut for the national side coming off the bench in a test match against Uruguay.

He was later named in the Georgia squad for the 2023 Rugby World Cup, however he did not feature.
