= Lado Chachanidze =

Georgian rugby union player

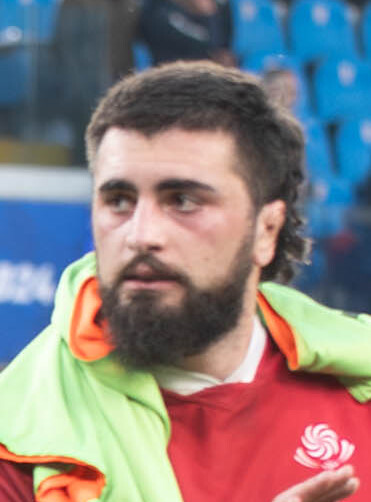
- Full name: Vladimeri Chachanidze
- Born: May 14, 2000 (age 26) Georgia
- Height: 2.00 m (6 ft 7 in)
- Weight: 122 kg (19 st 3 lb)

Rugby union career
- Position: Lock
- Current team: Black Lion
Senior career
Years	Team	Apps	(Points)
2018-2019	Lelo Saracens		
2019–2022	Aviron Bayonnais	1	(0)
2022-2023	USON Nevers	27	(0)
- Correct as of 3 July 2024
International career
Years	Team	Apps	(Points)
2022–	Georgia	16	(5)
- Correct as of 3 July 2024

Vladimeri Chachanidze (born 14 May 2000) is a Georgian rugby union player who plays as a lock for French club USON Nevers.
