= David Lolohea =

Tongan rugby union player

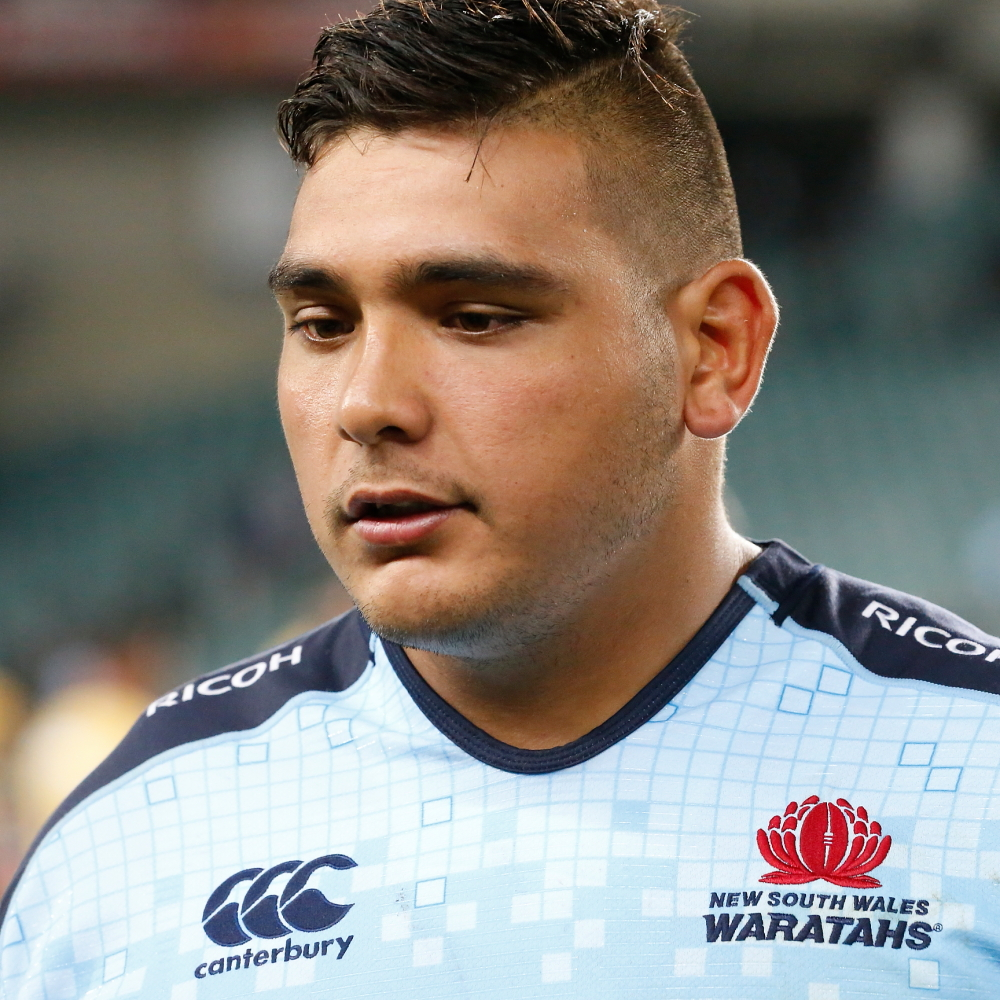
- Lolohea in 2017
- Born: 26 February 1992 (age 34) Penrith, Australia
- Height: 193 cm (6 ft 4 in)
- Weight: 138 kg (304 lb; 21 st 10 lb)
- School: Hills Sports High School

Rugby union career
- Position: Prop
- Current team: Dax
Senior career
Years	Team	Apps	(Points)
2015–2017	Greater Sydney Rams		
2017	Waratahs	9	(0)
2017	Sydney Rays		
2018–2021	Nevers	65	(35)
2021–2023	Provence	42	(15)
2023–	Dax	38	(15)
- Correct as of 22 February 2025
International career
Years	Team	Apps	(Points)
2018–	Tonga	12	(10)
- Correct as of 22 February 2025

David Lolohea (born 26 February 1992) is an Australian-born Tongan rugby union player, who plays for Dax. His preferred position is prop.

== Early career ==
Lolohea is from Penrith, grew up in Mount Druitt and attended Hills Sports High School. He professionally worked as a bouncer before playing rugby professionally and played his club rugby for West Harbour and Parramatta Two Blues.

== Professional career ==
Lolohea played in the National Rugby Championship for both the Greater Sydney Rams and Sydney Rays. His performances earned him a call-up to the Waratahs side during the 2017 Super Rugby season. He would go on take make 9 appearances that season for the Waratahs, however was not offered a new deal for 2018. Lolohea moved to France in 2018, first to Nevers, before representing Provence and Dax.

Lolohea represents Tonga internationally, making his debut for the side in 2018. He was named in the training squad ahead of the 2023 Rugby World Cup, but did not make the final squad for the tournament.
