= Felipe Arcos Pérez =

Uruguayan rugby union player

- Born: Felipe Mario Arcos Pérez Piccardo; 17 May 2000 (age 26) Uruguay
- Height: 1.80 m (5 ft 11 in)
- Weight: 93 kg (14.6 st; 205 lb)
- School: The British Schools of Montevideo

Rugby union career
- Position: Centre
Senior career
Years	Team	Apps	(Points)
2021–	Peñarol	6	(5)
- Correct as of 13 February 2022
International career
Years	Team	Apps	(Points)
2021–	Uruguay XV	3	(0)
2021–	Uruguay	2	(0)
- Correct as of 13 February 2022

Felipe Arcos Pérez (Note: In this Spanish name, the first or paternal surname is Arcos and the second or maternal family name is Pérez.) (born 17 May 2000) is a Uruguayan rugby union player, currently playing for Súper Liga Americana de Rugby side Peñarol. His preferred position is centre.

== Professional career ==
Arcos Pérez signed for Súper Liga Americana de Rugby side Peñarol ahead of the 2021 Súper Liga Americana de Rugby season, before re-signing ahead of 2022 season.

He has also represented the Uruguay national rugby union team, as well as the Uruguay national rugby sevens team. He competed for Uruguay at the 2024 Summer Olympics in Paris.
