= Owain Ruttan =

Canadian rugby union player

- Born: 25 June 1998 (age 28) Cobourg, Ontario, Canada
- Height: 190 cm (6 ft 3 in)
- Weight: 102 kg (225 lb; 16 st 1 lb)

Rugby union career
- Position: Flanker
- Current team: Toronto Arrows
Senior career
Years	Team	Apps	(Points)
2023–	Toronto Arrows	1	(0)
- Correct as of 20 March 2023
International career
Years	Team	Apps	(Points)
2018	Canada U20		
2022–	Canada	1	(0)
- Correct as of 20 March 2023

Owain Ruttan (born 25 June 1998) is a Canadian rugby union player, who plays for the Toronto Arrows in Major League Rugby (MLR). His preferred position is flanker.

== Early career ==
Ruttan is from Cobourg, Ontario and studied at the University of British Columbia where he captained their rugby side.

== Professional career ==
Ruttan was selected as the Toronto Arrows first round pick (Pick #5) in the 2022 Major League Rugby Collegiate Draft. He signed with the side ahead of the 2023 Major League Rugby season in October 2022.

Ruttan represented Canada U20 in 2018 and previously represented Canada's U19 team in 2017. He made his debut for Canada's national side in 2022 against Namibia.
