= Guram Papidze =

Georgia international rugby union player

- Born: June 16, 1997 (age 29) Tbilisi, Georgia
- Height: 1.86 m (6 ft 1 in)
- Weight: 127 kg (20 st 0 lb)

Rugby union career
- Position: Tighthead Prop
Senior career
Years	Team	Apps	(Points)
2016-2018	Lyon OU	4	(0)
2018-2021	Nevers	38	(20)
2021-2022	La Rochelle	19	(5)
2022-	Section Paloise	66	(10)
- Correct as of 24 June 2022
International career
Years	Team	Apps	(Points)
2016-2017	Georgia U20	5	(0)
2022-	Georgia	14	(10)
- Correct as of 24 June 2022

Guram Papidze (born June 16, 1997) in Tbilisi, Georgia is a Georgian rugby union player. He plays as Prop for Section Paloise in Top 14.

Papidze began his career in France with Lyon OU before joining Nevers, which enabled him to be a JIFF player (joueurs issus des filières de formation, loosely translated as "academy-trained players").

Papidze has been a Georgian international since 2022, following his representation of the Georgia U20 in the 2017 World Rugby Under 20 Championship.

Guram Papidze is part of the Georgia national rugby union team for the 2023 Rugby World Cup in France.

== Career ==
=== Club ===
Papidze first experienced French rugby at the age of eighteen with LOU alongside Antoine Nicoud. In 2018, he joined USON Nevers Rugby, where he spent three seasons, playing a total of 37 Pro D2 matches.

During the 2021–2022 season, he participated in 19 Top 14 matches with 3 starts for Stade Rochelais.

Papidze joined Section Paloise at the beginning of the 2022–23 Top 14 season. During his first season at Pau, he went to on to play in 22 matches.

=== National team ===
Papidze was a starting tighthead prop in the historic victory of Georgia against Wales at Cardiff's Millennium Stadium in November 2022.

== Personal life ==
Guram Papidze played water polo until the age of fifteen.

He speaks perfect French and is a literature enthusiast, particularly favoring the works of Hugo, Balzac, Maupassant, as well as Dickens.

He is also a cinephile.
