= 2026 Six Nations Championship =

International rugby union competition

2026 Men's Six Nations Championship
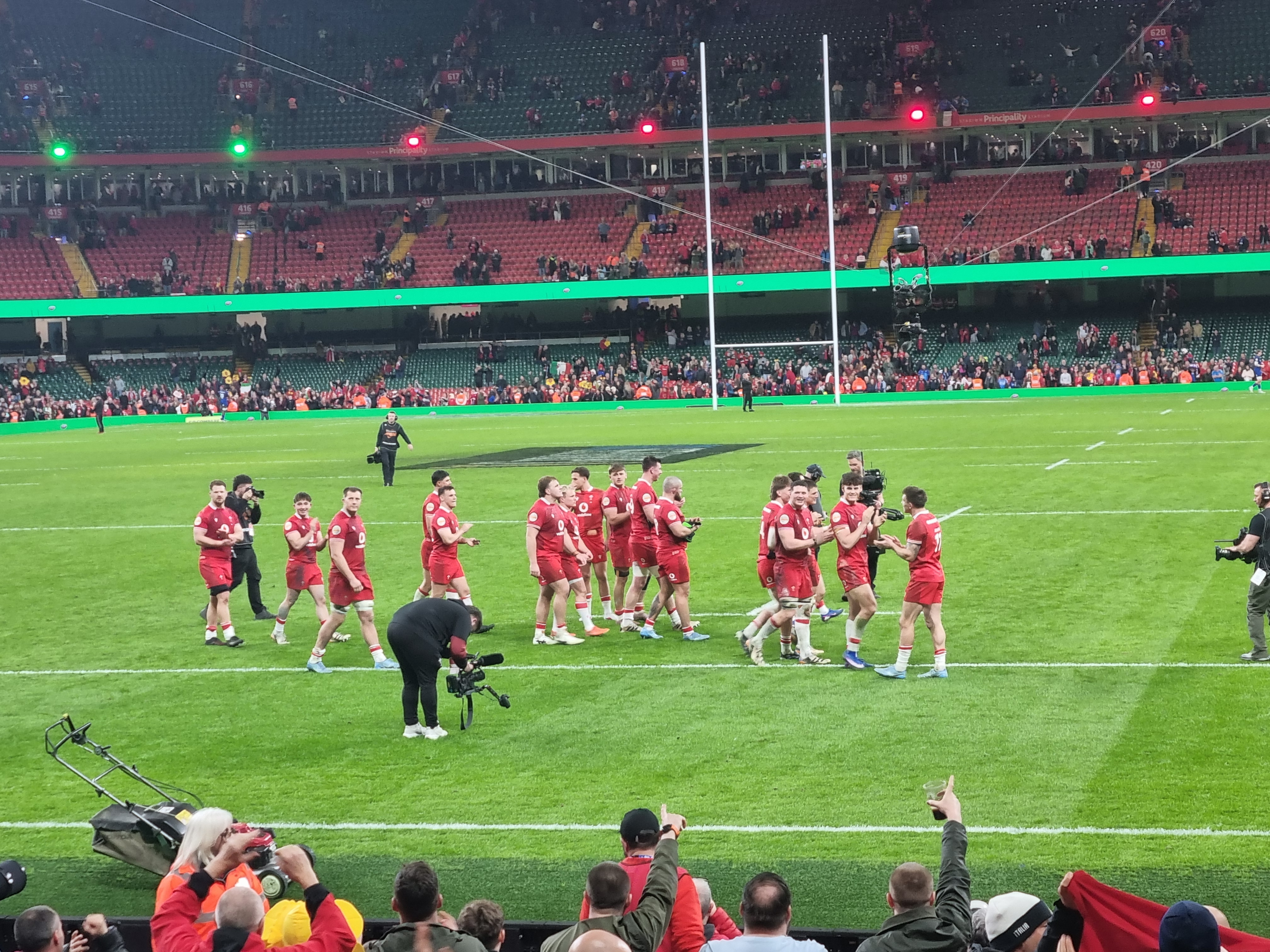
- The Welsh team celebrating against Italy
- Date: 5 February – 14 March 2026
- Countries: England; France; Ireland; Italy; Scotland; Wales

Tournament statistics
- Champions: France (20th title)
- Triple Crown: Ireland (15th title)
- Matches played: 15
- Attendance: 995,964 (66,398 per match)
- Tries scored: 111 (7.4 per match)
- Top point scorer: (France) Thomas Ramos (74)
- Top try scorer: (France) Louis Bielle-Biarrey (9)
- Player of the tournament: (France) Louis Bielle-Biarrey

The 2026 Men's Six Nations Championship (known as the Guinness Men's Six Nations for sponsorship reasons and branded as M6N) was a rugby union competition that took place from early February to mid-March 2026, featuring the men's national teams of England, France, Ireland, Italy, Scotland and Wales. It was the 132nd season of the competition (including its prior incarnations as the Home Nations Championship and the Five Nations Championship), and the 27th since it expanded to become the Six Nations Championship in 2000. It began on 5 February 2026 with a Thursday night match between France and Ireland, and ended with France against England on 14 March.

France entered the tournament as reigning champions, and secured a second successive title with the final kick of the final match, a penalty by the competition's top scorer, Thomas Ramos, squeezing France past England 48–46, and edging out repeat Triple Crown winners Ireland by two table points. Other notable results included Italy's first ever win over England, ending the last 100% head-to-head record in the competition, a record-breaking 50–40 victory for Scotland over France and the end of a 15-match losing streak in the championship by Wales, who beat Italy on the last day.

== Participants ==
| Nation | Stadium | | | Head coach | Captain | World Rugby Ranking | |
| Nation | Home stadium | Capacity | Location | Head coach | Captain | Start (Note: As of 2 February 2026) | End (Note: As of 16 March 2026) |
|---|---|---|---|---|---|---|---|
| England | Twickenham Stadium | 82,000 | London | (England) Steve Borthwick | Maro Itoje | 3 | 6 |
| France | Stade de France | 81,338 | Saint-Denis | (France) Fabien Galthié | Antoine Dupont | 5 | 4 |
| France | Stade Pierre-Mauroy | 50,186 | Villeneuve-d'Ascq | (France) Fabien Galthié | Antoine Dupont | 5 | 4 |
| Ireland | Aviva Stadium | 51,700 | Dublin | (England) Andy Farrell | Caelan Doris | 4 | 3 |
| Italy | Stadio Olimpico | 73,261 | Rome | (Argentina) Gonzalo Quesada | Michele Lamaro | 10 | 10 |
| Scotland | Murrayfield Stadium | 67,144 | Edinburgh | (Scotland) Gregor Townsend | Sione Tuipulotu | 9 | 7 |
| Wales | Millennium Stadium | 73,931 | Cardiff | (Wales) Steve Tandy | Dewi Lake | 11 | 11 |

== Table ==
| Pos | Team | Pld | W | D | L | PF | PA | PD | TF | TA | GS | TB | LB | Pts | FRA | IRE | SCO | ITA | ENG | WAL |
|---|---|---|---|---|---|---|---|---|---|---|---|---|---|---|---|---|---|---|---|---|
| 1 | France | 5 | 4 | 0 | 1 | 211 | 130 | +81 | 30 | 19 | 0 | 5 | 0 | 21 | — | 36–14 | | 33–8 | 48–46 | |
| 2 | Ireland | 5 | 4 | 0 | 1 | 146 | 108 | +38 | 20 | 14 | 0 | 3 | 0 | 19 | | — | 43–21 | 20–13 | | 27–17 |
| 3 | Scotland | 5 | 3 | 0 | 2 | 143 | 144 | −1 | 20 | 18 | 0 | 3 | 1 | 16 | 50–40 | | — | | 31–20 | |
| 4 | Italy | 5 | 2 | 0 | 3 | 79 | 117 | −38 | 9 | 16 | 0 | 0 | 1 | 9 | | | 18–15 | — | 23–18 | |
| 5 | England | 5 | 1 | 0 | 4 | 153 | 151 | +2 | 21 | 18 | 0 | 2 | 2 | 8 | | 21–42 | | | — | 48–7 |
| 6 | Wales | 5 | 1 | 0 | 4 | 90 | 172 | −82 | 11 | 26 | 0 | 1 | 1 | 6 | 12–54 | | 23–26 | 31–17 | | — |

Updated to match(es) played on 14 March 2026. Source: Six Nations Rugby
Legend: Blue = home team win; Yellow = draw; Red = away team win.

Table ranking rules

- Four points are awarded for a win.
- Two points are awarded for a draw.
- A bonus point is awarded to a team that scores four or more tries, or loses by seven points or fewer. If a team scores four or more tries, and loses by seven points or fewer, they are awarded both bonus points.
- Three bonus points are awarded to a team that wins all five of their matches (a Grand Slam). This ensures that a Grand Slam-winning team would top the table with at least 23 points, as there would otherwise be a scenario where a team could win all five matches with no bonus points for a total of 20 points and another team could win four matches with bonus points and lose their fifth match while claiming one or more bonus points giving a total of 21 or 22 points.
- Tiebreakers
  - If two or more teams are tied on table points, the team with the better points difference (points scored less points conceded) is ranked higher.
  - If the above tiebreaker fails to separate tied teams, the team that scores the higher number of total tries (including penalty tries) in their matches is ranked higher.
  - If two or more teams remain tied after applying the above tiebreakers then those teams will be placed at equal rank; if the tournament has concluded and more than one team is placed first then the title will be shared between them.

== Fixtures ==
The fixtures for the 2026 Six Nations were announced on 19 May 2025, beginning with the Six Nations' first ever Thursday night game between France and Ireland. It also featured the first ever Friday night game in Dublin as Ireland hosted Wales in the fourth round of matches. The competition would also take place over a reduced timeframe; instead of having rest weeks after rounds 2 and 3, it only had a rest week after round 3.

=== Round 1 ===
5 February 2026
21:10 CET

| (1 BP) France | 36–14 | Ireland |
| Try: Bielle-Biarrey (2) 12' c, 46' c Jalibert 21' m Ollivon 33' c Attissogbe 80' c Con: Ramos (4/5) 13', 34', 47', 80+1'; Pen: Ramos (1/1) 27' | Report | Try: Timoney 58' c Milne 61' c Con: S. Prendergast (2/2) 58', 61' |

Stade de France, Saint-Denis
Attendance: 80,000
Referee: Karl Dickson (England)

| FB | 15 | Thomas Ramos |
| RW | 14 | Théo Attissogbe |
| OC | 13 | Nicolas Depoortère |
| IC | 12 | Yoram Moefana | (substituted off) 49' |
| LW | 11 | Louis Bielle-Biarrey |
| FH | 10 | Matthieu Jalibert |
| SH | 9 | Antoine Dupont (c) | (substituted off) 73' |
| N8 | 8 | Anthony Jelonch |
| OF | 7 | Oscar Jégou |
| BF | 6 | François Cros | (substituted off) 62' |
| RL | 5 | Mickaël Guillard | (substituted off) 49' |
| LL | 4 | Charles Ollivon | (substituted off) 49' |
| TP | 3 | Dorian Aldegheri | (substituted off) 49' |
| HK | 2 | Julien Marchand | (substituted off) 49' |
| LP | 1 | Jean-Baptiste Gros | (substituted off) 49' |
Replacements:
| HK | 16 | Peato Mauvaka | (substituted on) 49' |
| PR | 17 | Rodrigue Neti | (substituted on) 49' |
| PR | 18 | Régis Montagne | (substituted on) 49' |
| LK | 19 | Emmanuel Meafou | (substituted on) 49' |
| LK | 20 | Hugo Auradou | (substituted on) 49' |
| FL | 21 | Lenni Nouchi | (substituted on) 62' |
| SH | 22 | Baptiste Serin | (substituted on) 73' |
| CE | 23 | Kalvin Gourgues | (substituted on) 49' |
Coach:
Fabien Galthié

| FB | 15 | Jamie Osborne | (substituted off) 73' |
| RW | 14 | Tommy O'Brien | (substituted off) 49' |
| OC | 13 | Garry Ringrose |
| IC | 12 | Stuart McCloskey |
| LW | 11 | Jacob Stockdale |
| FH | 10 | Sam Prendergast |
| SH | 9 | Jamison Gibson-Park |
| N8 | 8 | Caelan Doris (c) |
| OF | 7 | Josh van der Flier | (substituted off) 49' |
| BF | 6 | Cian Prendergast | (substituted off) 49' |
| RL | 5 | Tadhg Beirne |
| LL | 4 | Joe McCarthy | (substituted off) 49' |
| TP | 3 | Tom Clarkson | (substituted off) 59' |
| HK | 2 | Dan Sheehan | (substituted off) 62' |
| LP | 1 | Jeremy Loughman | (substituted off) 59' |
Replacements:
| HK | 16 | Rónan Kelleher | (substituted on) 62' |
| PR | 17 | Michael Milne | (substituted on) 59' |
| PR | 18 | Finlay Bealham | (substituted on) 59' |
| LK | 19 | James Ryan | (substituted on) 49' |
| N8 | 20 | Jack Conan | (substituted on) 49' |
| FL | 21 | Nick Timoney | (substituted on) 49' |
| SH | 22 | Craig Casey | (substituted on) 73' |
| FH | 23 | Jack Crowley | (substituted on) 49' |
Coach:
Andy Farrell

Player of the Match:
Mickaël Guillard (France)

Assistant referees:
Angus Gardner (Australia)
Jordan Way (Australia)
Television match official:
Ian Tempest (England)
Foul play review officer:
Richard Kelly (New Zealand)

Notes:

- France claimed the inaugural Solidarity Trophy, a new trophy contested by France and Ireland.
- The game took place on a Thursday night in order to avoid a clash with the 2026 Winter Olympics opening ceremony.

7 February 2026
15:10 CET

| Italy | 18–15 | Scotland (1 BP) |
| Try: Lynagh 8' m Menoncello 14' c Con: P. Garbisi (1/2) 15'; Pen: P. Garbisi (2/2) 35', 49' | Report | Try: Dempsey 25' c Horne 67' m Con: Russell (1/2) 25'; Pen: Russell (1/1) 47' |

Stadio Olimpico, Rome
Attendance: 68,245
Referee: Ben O'Keeffe (New Zealand)

| FB | 15 | Leonardo Marin | (substituted off) 73' |
| RW | 14 | Louis Lynagh |
| OC | 13 | Ignacio Brex |
| IC | 12 | Tommaso Menoncello |
| LW | 11 | Monty Ioane |
| FH | 10 | Paolo Garbisi |
| SH | 9 | Alessandro Fusco | (substituted off) 61' |
| N8 | 8 | Lorenzo Cannone |
| OF | 7 | Manuel Zuliani | (substituted off) 54' | (substituted on) 68' |
| BF | 6 | Michele Lamaro (c) | | (substituted off) 68' |
| RL | 5 | Andrea Zambonin | (substituted off) 68' |
| LL | 4 | Niccolò Cannone |
| TP | 3 | Simone Ferrari | (substituted off) 58' |
| HK | 2 | Giacomo Nicotera | (substituted off) 58' |
| LP | 1 | Danilo Fischetti | (substituted off) 58' | (substituted on) 80' |
Replacements:
| HK | 16 | Tommaso Di Bartolomeo | (substituted on) 58' |
| PR | 17 | Mirco Spagnolo | (substituted on) 58' | (substituted off) 80' |
| PR | 18 | Muhamed Hasa | (substituted on) 58' |
| LK | 19 | Federico Ruzza | (substituted on) 68' |
| LK | 20 | Riccardo Favretto | (substituted on) 54' |
| SH | 21 | Alessandro Garbisi | (substituted on) 61' |
| FH | 22 | Giacomo Da Re |
| FB | 23 | Lorenzo Pani | (substituted on) 73' |
Coach:
Gonzalo Quesada

| FB | 15 | Tom Jordan |
| RW | 14 | Kyle Steyn |
| OC | 13 | Huw Jones |
| IC | 12 | Sione Tuipulotu (c) |
| LW | 11 | Jamie Dobie | | (substituted off) 49' |
| FH | 10 | Finn Russell |
| SH | 9 | Ben White | | (substituted off) 64' |
| N8 | 8 | Jack Dempsey |
| OF | 7 | Rory Darge | | | (substituted off) 60' | (substituted on) 64' |
| BF | 6 | Matt Fagerson | | (substituted off) 64' |
| RL | 5 | Grant Gilchrist | | (substituted off) 49' |
| LL | 4 | Scott Cummings |
| TP | 3 | Zander Fagerson | | (substituted off) 64' |
| HK | 2 | Ewan Ashman | | (substituted off) 49' | (substituted on) 60' | (substituted off) 64' |
| LP | 1 | Pierre Schoeman | | (substituted off) 28' | (substituted on) 36' | (substituted off) 49' |
Replacements:
| HK | 16 | George Turner | (yellow card) 54' | (substituted on) 49' |
| PR | 17 | Nathan McBeth | | (substituted on) 28' | (substituted off) 36' | (substituted on) 49' |
| PR | 18 | Elliot Millar Mills | | (substituted on) 64' |
| LK | 19 | Max Williamson | | (substituted on) 64' |
| FL | 20 | Gregor Brown | | (substituted on) 49' |
| SH | 21 | George Horne | | (substituted on) 64' |
| FH | 22 | Adam Hastings |
| WG | 23 | Darcy Graham | | (substituted on) 49' |
Coach:
Gregor Townsend

Player of the Match:
Simone Ferrari (Italy)

Assistant referees:
James Doleman (New Zealand)
Katsuki Furuse (Japan)
Television match official:
Richard Kelly (New Zealand)
Foul play review officer:
Marius van der Westhuizen (South Africa)

Notes:

- Italy reclaimed the Cuttitta Cup, having lost it in the previous year's tournament.
- Ignacio Brex, Paolo Garbisi and Michele Lamaro (all Italy) earned their 50th test caps.
- This was Italy's first opening win of a Six Nations campaign since defeating France 23–18 in 2013.

7 February 2026
16:40 GMT

| (1 BP) England | 48–7 | Wales |
| Try: Arundell (3) 7' c, 18' m, 35' c Earl 23' c Roebuck 44' c Penalty try 66'; Freeman 79' m Con: Ford (4/6) 8', 24', 36', 45'; Pen: Ford (1/1) 2' | Report | Try: Adams 51' c Con: Edwards (1/1) 52' |

Twickenham Stadium, London
Attendance: 81,953
Referee: Pierre Brousset (France)

| FB | 15 | Freddie Steward | | (substituted off) 64' |
| RW | 14 | Tom Roebuck | | (substituted off) 64' |
| OC | 13 | Tommy Freeman |
| IC | 12 | Fraser Dingwall |
| LW | 11 | Henry Arundell |
| FH | 10 | George Ford |
| SH | 9 | Alex Mitchell | | (substituted off) 66' |
| N8 | 8 | Ben Earl |
| OF | 7 | Sam Underhill | | (substituted off) 50' |
| BF | 6 | Guy Pepper |
| RL | 5 | Ollie Chessum |
| LL | 4 | Alex Coles | | (substituted off) 50' |
| TP | 3 | Joe Heyes | | (substituted off) 50' |
| HK | 2 | Jamie George (c) | | (substituted off) 50' |
| LP | 1 | Ellis Genge | | (substituted off) 41' |
Replacements:
| HK | 16 | Luke Cowan-Dickie | | (substituted on) 50' |
| PR | 17 | Bevan Rodd | | (substituted on) 41' |
| PR | 18 | Trevor Davison | | (substituted on) 50' |
| LK | 19 | Maro Itoje | (yellow card) 51' | (substituted on) 50' |
| FL | 20 | Tom Curry | (yellow card) 75' | (substituted on) 50' |
| N8 | 21 | Henry Pollock | | (substituted on) 64' |
| SH | 22 | Ben Spencer | | (substituted on) 66' |
| FH | 23 | Marcus Smith | | (substituted on) 64' |
Coach:
Steve Borthwick

| FB | 15 | Louis Rees-Zammit |
| RW | 14 | Ellis Mee | | (substituted off) 52' |
| OC | 13 | Eddie James | | (substituted off) 17' | (substituted on) 27' |
| IC | 12 | Ben Thomas | (yellow card) 64' |
| LW | 11 | Josh Adams |
| FH | 10 | Dan Edwards |
| SH | 9 | Tomos Williams | | (substituted off) 78' |
| N8 | 8 | Aaron Wainwright |
| OF | 7 | Josh Macleod | | (substituted off) 52' |
| BF | 6 | Alex Mann | | (substituted off) 17' | (substituted on) 27' | (substituted off) 50' |
| RL | 5 | Adam Beard | | (substituted off) 69' |
| LL | 4 | Dafydd Jenkins |
| TP | 3 | Archie Griffin | | (substituted off) 50' |
| HK | 2 | Dewi Lake (c) | (yellow card) 17' | | | (substituted off) 66' |
| LP | 1 | Nicky Smith | (yellow card) 16' | | | (substituted off) 50' |
Replacements:
| HK | 16 | Liam Belcher | | (substituted on) 17' | (substituted off) 27' | (substituted on) 66' |
| PR | 17 | Rhys Carré | | (substituted on) 17' | (substituted off) 27' | (substituted on) 50' |
| PR | 18 | Tomas Francis | | (substituted on) 50' |
| LK | 19 | Ben Carter | | (substituted on) 69' |
| FL | 20 | Taine Plumtree | (yellow card) 66' | | | (substituted on) 50' |
| FL | 21 | Harri Deaves | | (substituted on) 52' |
| SH | 22 | Kieran Hardy | | (substituted on) 78' |
| CE | 23 | Mason Grady | | (substituted on) 52' |
Coach:
Steve Tandy

Player of the Match:
George Ford (England)

Assistant referees:
Nic Berry (Australia)
Morné Ferreira (South Africa)
Television match official:
Tual Trainini (France)
Foul play review officer:
Brett Cronan (Australia)

Notes:

- Immanuel Feyi-Waboso was initially selected on the right wing for England, but had to withdraw through injury, with Tom Roebuck taking his place in the starting XV.

=== Round 2 ===
14 February 2026
14:10 GMT

| Ireland | 20–13 | Italy (1 BP) |
| Try: Osborne 16' m Conan 42' m Baloucoune 56' c Con: Crowley (1/1) 57'; Pen: Crowley (1/1) 62' | Report | Try: Nicotera 32' c Con: P. Garbisi (1/1) 33'; Pen: P. Garbisi (2/2) 20', 66' |

Aviva Stadium, Dublin
Attendance: 51,700
Referee: Hollie Davidson (Scotland)

| FB | 15 | Jamie Osborne |
| RW | 14 | Robert Baloucoune |
| OC | 13 | Garry Ringrose |
| IC | 12 | Stuart McCloskey |
| LW | 11 | James Lowe |
| FH | 10 | Sam Prendergast | | (substituted off) 55' |
| SH | 9 | Craig Casey | (yellow card) 31' | (substituted off) 51' |
| N8 | 8 | Jack Conan |
| OF | 7 | Caelan Doris (c) |
| BF | 6 | Cormac Izuchukwu | | (substituted off) 58' |
| RL | 5 | James Ryan | | (substituted off) 69' |
| LL | 4 | Joe McCarthy | | (substituted off) 51' |
| TP | 3 | Tom Clarkson | | (substituted off) 40' |
| HK | 2 | Dan Sheehan | | (substituted off) 51' |
| LP | 1 | Jeremy Loughman | | (substituted off) 66' |
Replacements:
| HK | 16 | Rónan Kelleher | | (substituted on) 51' |
| PR | 17 | Tom O'Toole | | (substituted on) 66' |
| PR | 18 | Tadhg Furlong | | (substituted on) 40' |
| LK | 19 | Edwin Edogbo | | (substituted on) 69' |
| LK | 20 | Tadhg Beirne | | (substituted on) 51' |
| FL | 21 | Nick Timoney | | (substituted on) 58' |
| SH | 22 | Jamison Gibson-Park | | (substituted on) 51' |
| FH | 23 | Jack Crowley | | (substituted on) 55' |
Coach:
Andy Farrell

| FB | 15 | Lorenzo Pani |
| RW | 14 | Louis Lynagh | (yellow card) 10' |
| OC | 13 | Tommaso Menoncello |
| IC | 12 | Leonardo Marin | | (substituted off) 66' |
| LW | 11 | Monty Ioane |
| FH | 10 | Paolo Garbisi |
| SH | 9 | Alessandro Fusco | | (substituted off) 62' |
| N8 | 8 | Lorenzo Cannone | | (substituted off) 66' |
| OF | 7 | Manuel Zuliani |
| BF | 6 | Michele Lamaro (c) |
| RL | 5 | Andrea Zambonin | | (substituted off) 60' |
| LL | 4 | Niccolò Cannone | | (substituted off) 66' |
| TP | 3 | Simone Ferrari | | (substituted off) 58' |
| HK | 2 | Giacomo Nicotera | | (substituted off) 58' |
| LP | 1 | Danilo Fischetti | | (substituted off) 58' |
Replacements:
| HK | 16 | Tommaso Di Bartolomeo | | (substituted on) 58' |
| PR | 17 | Mirco Spagnolo | | (substituted on) 58' |
| PR | 18 | Muhamed Hasa | | (substituted on) 58' |
| LK | 19 | Federico Ruzza | | (substituted on) 60' |
| LK | 20 | Riccardo Favretto | | (substituted on) 66' |
| FL | 21 | David Odiase | | (substituted on) 66' |
| SH | 22 | Alessandro Garbisi | | (substituted on) 62' |
| WG | 23 | Paolo Odogwu | | (substituted on) 66' |
Coach:
Gonzalo Quesada

Player of the Match:
Robert Baloucoune (Ireland)

Assistant referees:
Matthew Carley (England)
Luc Ramos (France)
Television match official:
Ian Tempest (England)
Foul play review officer:
Tual Trainini (France)

Notes:

- Edwin Edogbo (Ireland) made his international debut.
- Hollie Davidson became the first woman to referee a men's Six Nations match.

14 February 2026
16:40 GMT

| (1 BP) Scotland | 31–20 | England |
| Try: Jones (2) 9' c, 52' c Ritchie 13' c White 26' c Con: Russell (4/4) 10', 14', 27', 53'; Pen: Russell (1/1) 3' | Report | Try: Arundell 20' c Earl 77' c Con: Ford (2/2) 21', 77'; Pen: Ford (2/2) 25', 44' |

Murrayfield Stadium, Edinburgh
Attendance: 67,144
Referee: Nika Amashukeli (Georgia)

| FB | 15 | Tom Jordan | (substituted off) 68' |
| RW | 14 | Kyle Steyn |
| OC | 13 | Huw Jones |
| IC | 12 | Sione Tuipulotu (c) |
| LW | 11 | Jamie Dobie | (substituted off) 74' |
| FH | 10 | Finn Russell |
| SH | 9 | Ben White | (substituted off) 57' |
| N8 | 8 | Jack Dempsey | (substituted off) 56' |
| OF | 7 | Rory Darge |
| BF | 6 | Jamie Ritchie | (substituted off) 40' |
| RL | 5 | Scott Cummings |
| LL | 4 | Gregor Brown |
| TP | 3 | Zander Fagerson | (substituted off) 50' |
| HK | 2 | George Turner | (substituted off) 50' |
| LP | 1 | Nathan McBeth | (substituted off) 48' |
Replacements:
| HK | 16 | Dave Cherry | (substituted on) 50' |
| PR | 17 | Pierre Schoeman | (substituted on) 48' |
| PR | 18 | Elliot Millar Mills | (substituted on) 50' |
| LK | 19 | Max Williamson | (substituted on) 56' |
| FL | 20 | Matt Fagerson | (substituted on) 40' |
| SH | 21 | George Horne | (substituted on) 57' |
| FH | 22 | Adam Hastings | (substituted on) 74' |
| WG | 23 | Darcy Graham | (substituted on) 68' |
Coach:
Gregor Townsend

| FB | 15 | Freddie Steward |
| RW | 14 | Tom Roebuck |
| OC | 13 | Tommy Freeman |
| IC | 12 | Fraser Dingwall |
| LW | 11 | Henry Arundell | (yellow card) 7' (yellow-red card) 37' |
| FH | 10 | George Ford |
| SH | 9 | Alex Mitchell | | (substituted off) 68' |
| N8 | 8 | Ben Earl |
| OF | 7 | Sam Underhill | | (substituted off) 40' |
| BF | 6 | Guy Pepper | | (substituted off) 56' |
| RL | 5 | Ollie Chessum |
| LL | 4 | Maro Itoje (c) | | (substituted off) 56' |
| TP | 3 | Joe Heyes | | (substituted off) 67' |
| HK | 2 | Luke Cowan-Dickie | | (substituted off) 56' |
| LP | 1 | Ellis Genge | | (substituted off) 56' |
Replacements:
| HK | 16 | Jamie George | | (substituted on) 56' |
| PR | 17 | Bevan Rodd | | (substituted on) 56' |
| PR | 18 | Trevor Davison | | (substituted on) 67' |
| LK | 19 | Alex Coles | | (substituted on) 56' |
| FL | 20 | Tom Curry | | (substituted on) 40' |
| N8 | 21 | Henry Pollock | | (substituted on) 56' |
| SH | 22 | Ben Spencer | | (substituted on) 68' |
| FH | 23 | Fin Smith | | (substituted on) 57' |
Coach:
Steve Borthwick

Player of the Match:
Kyle Steyn (Scotland)

Assistant referees:
Andrea Piardi (Italy)
Gianluca Gnecchi (Italy)
Television match official:
Marius van der Westhuizen (South Africa)
Foul play review officer:
Matteo Liperini (Italy)

Notes:

- Scotland reclaimed the Calcutta Cup.

15 February 2026
15:10 GMT

| Wales | 12–54 | France (1 BP) |
| Try: Carré 18' c Grady 77' m Con: Edwards (1/1) 19' | Report | Try: Gailleton 1' c Bielle-Biarrey 10' m Brau-Boirie 14' c Jalibert 38' c Marchand 43' c Attissogbe (2) 48' c, 57' c Ollivon 61' c Con: Ramos (7/8) 2', 15', 39', 44', 49', 58', 62' |

Millennium Stadium, Cardiff
Attendance: 57,744
Referee: James Doleman (New Zealand)

| FB | 15 | Louis Rees-Zammit |
| RW | 14 | Ellis Mee | (substituted off) 54' |
| OC | 13 | Eddie James |
| IC | 12 | Joe Hawkins |
| LW | 11 | Josh Adams |
| FH | 10 | Dan Edwards | (substituted off) 54' |
| SH | 9 | Tomos Williams | (substituted off) 70' |
| N8 | 8 | Olly Cracknell | (substituted off) 49' |
| OF | 7 | Alex Mann |
| BF | 6 | Aaron Wainwright |
| RL | 5 | Adam Beard | (substituted off) 61' |
| LL | 4 | Dafydd Jenkins |
| TP | 3 | Tomas Francis | (substituted off) 49' |
| HK | 2 | Dewi Lake (c) | (substituted off) 49' |
| LP | 1 | Rhys Carré | (substituted off) 49' |
Replacements:
| HK | 16 | Ryan Elias | (substituted on) 49' |
| PR | 17 | Nicky Smith | (substituted on) 49' |
| PR | 18 | Archie Griffin | (substituted on) 49' |
| LK | 19 | Ben Carter | (substituted on) 61' |
| N8 | 20 | Taine Plumtree | (substituted on) 49' |
| SH | 21 | Kieran Hardy | (substituted on) 70' |
| FH | 22 | Jarrod Evans | (substituted on) 54' |
| CE | 23 | Mason Grady | (substituted on) 54' |
Coach:
Steve Tandy

| FB | 15 | Thomas Ramos |
| RW | 14 | Théo Attissogbe |
| OC | 13 | Émilien Gailleton | (substituted off) 67' |
| IC | 12 | Fabien Brau-Boirie |
| LW | 11 | Louis Bielle-Biarrey |
| FH | 10 | Matthieu Jalibert |
| SH | 9 | Antoine Dupont (c) | (substituted off) 58' |
| N8 | 8 | Anthony Jelonch | (substituted off) 51' |
| OF | 7 | Oscar Jégou |
| BF | 6 | François Cros | (substituted off) 51' |
| RL | 5 | Mickaël Guillard | (substituted off) 51' | (substituted on) 64' |
| LL | 4 | Charles Ollivon |
| TP | 3 | Dorian Aldegheri | (substituted off) 49' |
| HK | 2 | Julien Marchand | (substituted off) 49' |
| LP | 1 | Jean-Baptiste Gros | (substituted off) 49' |
Replacements:
| HK | 16 | Maxime Lamothe | (substituted on) 49' |
| PR | 17 | Rodrigue Neti | (substituted on) 49' |
| PR | 18 | Régis Montagne | (substituted on) 49' |
| LK | 19 | Thibaud Flament | (substituted on) 51' |
| LK | 20 | Emmanuel Meafou | (substituted on) 51' | (substituted off) 64' |
| FL | 21 | Lenni Nouchi | (substituted on) 51' |
| SH | 22 | Baptiste Serin | (substituted on) 58' |
| CE | 23 | Noah Nene | (substituted on) 67' |
Coach:
Fabien Galthié

Player of the Match:
Matthieu Jalibert (France)

Assistant referees:
Christophe Ridley (England)
Sam Grove-White (Scotland)
Television match official:
Richard Kelly (New Zealand)
Foul play review officer:
Mike Adamson (Scotland)

Notes:

- Fabien Brau-Boirie and Noah Nene (both France) made their international debuts.
- Julien Marchand and Charles Ollivon (both France) earned their 50th test caps.
- This was the most points scored by France over Wales, surpassing the 51 points scored in 1998.
- The 57,744 attendance was the lowest ever for a Six Nations match in Cardiff.

=== Round 3 ===
21 February 2026
14:10 GMT

| England | 21–42 | Ireland (1 BP) |
| Try: Dingwall 40' c Lawrence 53' c Underhill 75' c Con: Ford (3/3) 41', 53', 76' | Report | Try: Gibson-Park 19' c Baloucoune 26' m O'Brien 29' c Sheehan 42' c Osborne 69' c Con: Crowley (4/5) 20', 30', 43', 70'; Pen: Crowley (3/4) 8', 58', 65' |

Twickenham Stadium, London
Attendance: 81,953
Referee: Andrea Piardi (Italy) (Note: Referee Andrea Piardi sustained a knee injury during the first half of the match between England and Ireland. He was replaced by assistant referee Pierre Brousset, while Craig Maxwell-Keys (England) replaced Brousset as AR1.)

| FB | 15 | Freddie Steward | (yellow card) 27' | (substituted off) 39' |
| RW | 14 | Tommy Freeman |
| OC | 13 | Ollie Lawrence |
| IC | 12 | Fraser Dingwall |
| LW | 11 | Henry Arundell |
| FH | 10 | George Ford |
| SH | 9 | Alex Mitchell | | (substituted off) 23' |
| N8 | 8 | Henry Pollock | (yellow card) 41' |
| OF | 7 | Ben Earl | | (substituted off) 70' |
| BF | 6 | Tom Curry | | (substituted off) 51' |
| RL | 5 | Ollie Chessum |
| LL | 4 | Maro Itoje (c) | | (substituted off) 54' |
| TP | 3 | Joe Heyes | | (substituted off) 72' |
| HK | 2 | Luke Cowan-Dickie | | (substituted off) 29' |
| LP | 1 | Ellis Genge | | (substituted off) 51' |
Replacements:
| HK | 16 | Jamie George | | (substituted on) 29' |
| PR | 17 | Bevan Rodd | | (substituted on) 51' |
| PR | 18 | Trevor Davison | | (substituted on) 72' |
| LK | 19 | Alex Coles | | (substituted on) 54' |
| FL | 20 | Guy Pepper | | (substituted on) 51' |
| FL | 21 | Sam Underhill | | (substituted on) 70' |
| SH | 22 | Jack van Poortvliet | | (substituted on) 23' |
| FH | 23 | Marcus Smith | | (substituted on) 39' |
Coach:
Steve Borthwick

| FB | 15 | Jamie Osborne | (yellow card) 53' |
| RW | 14 | Robert Baloucoune |
| OC | 13 | Garry Ringrose | | (substituted off) 54' |
| IC | 12 | Stuart McCloskey |
| LW | 11 | James Lowe | | (substituted off) 18' |
| FH | 10 | Jack Crowley |
| SH | 9 | Jamison Gibson-Park | | (substituted off) 71' |
| N8 | 8 | Caelan Doris (c) |
| OF | 7 | Josh van der Flier | | (substituted off) 49' |
| BF | 6 | Tadhg Beirne |
| RL | 5 | James Ryan |
| LL | 4 | Joe McCarthy | | (substituted off) 62' |
| TP | 3 | Tadhg Furlong | | (substituted off) 46' |
| HK | 2 | Dan Sheehan | | (substituted off) 55' |
| LP | 1 | Jeremy Loughman | | (substituted off) 46' |
Replacements:
| HK | 16 | Rónan Kelleher | | (substituted on) 55' |
| PR | 17 | Tom O'Toole | | (substituted on) 46' |
| PR | 18 | Finlay Bealham | | (substituted on) 46' |
| FL | 19 | Nick Timoney | | (substituted on) 49' |
| FL | 20 | Cian Prendergast | | (substituted on) 62' |
| SH | 21 | Craig Casey | | (substituted on) 71' |
| CE | 22 | Ciarán Frawley | | (substituted on) 54' |
| CE | 23 | Tommy O'Brien | | (substituted on) 18' |
Coach:
Andy Farrell

Player of the Match:
Jamison Gibson-Park (Ireland)

Assistant referees:
Pierre Brousset (France)
Gianluca Gnecchi (Italy)
Television match official:
Matteo Liperini (Italy)
Foul play review officer:
Mike Adamson (Scotland)

Notes:

- Jack Conan (Ireland) was originally named among the replacements but was ruled out due to illness; he was replaced on the bench by Cian Prendergast.
- Maro Itoje became the ninth player to earn 100 test caps for England.
- Ireland's 42 points was the most they had scored in an away match against England; the 21-point winning margin was also Ireland's biggest in an away match against England.
- Ireland retained the Millennium Trophy.

21 February 2026
16:40 GMT

| (1 BP) Wales | 23–26 | Scotland (1 BP) |
| Try: Carré 9' c Adams 18' c Con: Costelow (2/2) 9', 19'; Pen: Costelow (2/2) 30', 48'; Evans (1/1) 57' | Report | Try: Steyn 13' m Russell 54' c Graham 57' c Turner 74' c Con: Russell (3/4) 54', 58', 75' |

Millennium Stadium, Cardiff
Attendance: 70,649
Referee: Matthew Carley (England)

| FB | 15 | Louis Rees-Zammit |
| RW | 14 | Gabriel Hamer-Webb | | (substituted off) 2' | (substituted on) 9' | (substituted off) 61' |
| OC | 13 | Eddie James |
| IC | 12 | Joe Hawkins | (yellow card) 4' |
| LW | 11 | Josh Adams |
| FH | 10 | Sam Costelow | | (substituted off) 54' |
| SH | 9 | Tomos Williams |
| N8 | 8 | Aaron Wainwright |
| OF | 7 | Alex Mann |
| BF | 6 | Taine Plumtree | | (substituted off) 9' |
| RL | 5 | Ben Carter |
| LL | 4 | Dafydd Jenkins | | (substituted off) 75' |
| TP | 3 | Tomas Francis | | (substituted off) 51' |
| HK | 2 | Dewi Lake (c) | | (substituted off) 54' |
| LP | 1 | Rhys Carré | | (substituted off) 43' |
Replacements:
| HK | 16 | Ryan Elias | | (substituted on) 54' |
| PR | 17 | Nicky Smith | | (substituted on) 43' |
| PR | 18 | Archie Griffin | | (substituted on) 51' |
| LK | 19 | Freddie Thomas | | (substituted on) 75' |
| FL | 20 | James Botham | | (substituted on) 9' |
| SH | 21 | Kieran Hardy |
| FH | 22 | Jarrod Evans | | (substituted on) 54' |
| FB | 23 | Blair Murray | | (substituted on) 2' | (substituted off) 9' | (substituted on) 61' |
Coach:
Steve Tandy

| FB | 15 | Blair Kinghorn |
| RW | 14 | Kyle Steyn |
| OC | 13 | Huw Jones | (substituted off) 66' |
| IC | 12 | Sione Tuipulotu (c) |
| LW | 11 | Duhan van der Merwe | (substituted off) 54' |
| FH | 10 | Finn Russell |
| SH | 9 | Ben White | (substituted off) 54' |
| N8 | 8 | Matt Fagerson |
| OF | 7 | Rory Darge |
| BF | 6 | Gregor Brown |
| RL | 5 | Scott Cummings | (substituted off) 66' |
| LL | 4 | Max Williamson | (substituted off) 34' |
| TP | 3 | Zander Fagerson | (substituted off) 54' |
| HK | 2 | Dave Cherry | (substituted off) 54' |
| LP | 1 | Nathan McBeth | (substituted off) 34' |
Replacements:
| HK | 16 | George Turner | (substituted on) 54' |
| PR | 17 | Pierre Schoeman | (substituted on) 34' |
| PR | 18 | Elliot Millar Mills | (substituted on) 54' |
| LK | 19 | Grant Gilchrist | (substituted on) 66' |
| N8 | 20 | Josh Bayliss | (substituted on) 34' |
| SH | 21 | George Horne | (substituted on) 54' |
| FH | 22 | Tom Jordan | (substituted on) 66' |
| WG | 23 | Darcy Graham | (substituted on) 54' |
Coach:
Gregor Townsend

Player of the Match:
Rory Darge (Scotland)

Assistant referees:
Karl Dickson (England)
Adam Leal (England)
Television match official:
Ian Tempest (England)
Foul play review officer:
Eric Gauzins (France)

Notes:

- Gabriel Hamer-Webb (Wales) made his international debut.
- Scotland retained the Doddie Weir Cup.

22 February 2026
16:10 CET

| (1 BP) France | 33–8 | Italy |
| Try: Bielle-Biarrey 4' c Meafou 15' m Ramos 29' c Dréan 71' c Gailleton 77' c Con: Ramos (4/5) 5', 30', 72', 78' | Report | Try: Capuozzo 32' m Pen: P. Garbisi (1/1) 40' |

Stade Pierre-Mauroy, Villeneuve-d'Ascq
Attendance: 48,544
Referee: Andrew Brace (Ireland)

| FB | 15 | Théo Attissogbe |
| RW | 14 | Gaël Dréan |
| OC | 13 | Émilien Gailleton | (substituted off) 59' | (substituted on) 66' |
| IC | 12 | Fabien Brau-Boirie | | (substituted off) 66' |
| LW | 11 | Louis Bielle-Biarrey |
| FH | 10 | Thomas Ramos |
| SH | 9 | Antoine Dupont (c) | (substituted off) 76' |
| N8 | 8 | Anthony Jelonch | (substituted off) 75' |
| OF | 7 | Oscar Jégou | (substituted off) 55' |
| BF | 6 | François Cros | (substituted off) 55' |
| RL | 5 | Emmanuel Meafou |
| LL | 4 | Thibaud Flament |
| TP | 3 | Dorian Aldegheri | (substituted off) 54' |
| HK | 2 | Julien Marchand | (substituted off) 59' |
| LP | 1 | Jean-Baptiste Gros | (substituted off) 38' |
Replacements:
| HK | 16 | Peato Mauvaka | (substituted on) 59' |
| PR | 17 | Rodrigue Neti | (substituted on) 38' |
| PR | 18 | Georges-Henri Colombe | (substituted on) 54' |
| LK | 19 | Charles Ollivon | (substituted on) 55' |
| LK | 20 | Mickaël Guillard | (substituted on) 75' |
| FL | 21 | Lenni Nouchi | (substituted on) 55' |
| SH | 22 | Baptiste Serin | (substituted on) 76' |
| CE | 23 | Pierre-Louis Barassi | (substituted on) 59' |
Coach:
Fabien Galthié

| FB | 15 | Ange Capuozzo | | (substituted off) 73' |
| RW | 14 | Louis Lynagh | (yellow card) 71' |
| OC | 13 | Leonardo Marin |
| IC | 12 | Tommaso Menoncello |
| LW | 11 | Monty Ioane | | (substituted off) 68' |
| FH | 10 | Paolo Garbisi |
| SH | 9 | Alessandro Fusco | | (substituted off) 60' |
| N8 | 8 | Lorenzo Cannone |
| OF | 7 | Manuel Zuliani |
| BF | 6 | Michele Lamaro (c) |
| RL | 5 | Andrea Zambonin | | (substituted off) 54' |
| LL | 4 | Niccolò Cannone | | (substituted off) 54' |
| TP | 3 | Simone Ferrari | | (substituted off) 54' |
| HK | 2 | Giacomo Nicotera | | (substituted off) 54' |
| LP | 1 | Danilo Fischetti | | (substituted off) 54' |
Replacements:
| HK | 16 | Pablo Dimcheff | | (substituted on) 54' |
| PR | 17 | Mirco Spagnolo | | (substituted on) 54' |
| PR | 18 | Giosuè Zilocchi | | (substituted on) 54' |
| LK | 19 | Federico Ruzza | | (substituted on) 54' |
| LK | 20 | Riccardo Favretto | | (substituted on) 54' |
| FL | 21 | David Odiase | | (substituted on) 73' |
| SH | 22 | Alessandro Garbisi | | (substituted on) 60' |
| WG | 23 | Paolo Odogwu | | (substituted on) 68' |
Coach:
Gonzalo Quesada

Player of the Match:
Emmanuel Meafou (France)

Assistant referees:
Luke Pearce (England)
Eoghan Cross (Ireland)
Television match official:
Olly Hodges (Ireland)
Foul play review officer:
Ben Whitehouse (Wales)

Notes:

- Matthieu Jalibert (France) was originally named to start at fly-half but was ruled out the day before the match; he was replaced by Thomas Ramos at fly-half, who was replaced by Théo Attissogbe at fullback, who was replaced by debutant Gaël Dréan on the right wing.
- Gaël Dréan (France) made his international debut.
- Thomas Ramos (France) earned his 50th test cap.
- France retained the Giuseppe Garibaldi Trophy.

=== Round 4 ===
6 March 2026
20:10 GMT

| (1 BP) Ireland | 27–17 | Wales |
| Try: Stockdale 6' c Crowley 37' m Conan 44' c Osborne 68' m Con: Crowley (2/4) 7', 45'; Pen: Crowley (1/1) 77' | Report | Try: Carré 42' c Botham 63' c Con: Edwards (2/2) 43', 63'; Pen: Edwards (1/1) 17' |

Aviva Stadium, Dublin
Attendance: 51,700
Referee: Karl Dickson (England)

| FB | 15 | Jamie Osborne |
| RW | 14 | Robert Baloucoune |
| OC | 13 | Garry Ringrose | (substituted off) 70' |
| IC | 12 | Stuart McCloskey |
| LW | 11 | Jacob Stockdale | (substituted off) 70' |
| FH | 10 | Jack Crowley |
| SH | 9 | Jamison Gibson-Park | (substituted off) 24' | (substituted on) 32' | (substituted off) 76' |
| N8 | 8 | Caelan Doris (c) |
| OF | 7 | Nick Timoney | (substituted off) 60' |
| BF | 6 | Jack Conan |
| RL | 5 | Tadhg Beirne |
| LL | 4 | James Ryan | (substituted off) 60' |
| TP | 3 | Tadhg Furlong | (substituted off) 60' |
| HK | 2 | Rónan Kelleher | (substituted off) 64' |
| LP | 1 | Tom O'Toole | (substituted off) 64' |
Replacements:
| HK | 16 | Tom Stewart | (substituted on) 64' |
| PR | 17 | Michael Milne | (substituted on) 64' |
| PR | 18 | Tom Clarkson | (substituted on) 60' |
| LK | 19 | Joe McCarthy | (substituted on) 60' |
| FL | 20 | Josh van der Flier | (substituted on) 60' |
| SH | 21 | Nathan Doak | (substituted on) 24' | (substituted off) 32' | (substituted on) 76' |
| CE | 22 | Tom Farrell | (substituted on) 60' |
| CE | 23 | Ciarán Frawley | (substituted on) 70' |
Coach:
Andy Farrell

| FB | 15 | Louis Rees-Zammit |
| RW | 14 | Ellis Mee | | (substituted off) 70' |
| OC | 13 | Eddie James |
| IC | 12 | Joe Hawkins |
| LW | 11 | Josh Adams |
| FH | 10 | Dan Edwards |
| SH | 9 | Tomos Williams | (yellow card) 69' |
| N8 | 8 | Aaron Wainwright | | (substituted off) 45' |
| OF | 7 | James Botham |
| BF | 6 | Alex Mann |
| RL | 5 | Ben Carter | | (substituted off) 57' |
| LL | 4 | Dafydd Jenkins |
| TP | 3 | Tomas Francis | | (substituted off) 57' |
| HK | 2 | Dewi Lake (c) | | (substituted off) 57' |
| LP | 1 | Rhys Carré | | (substituted off) 45' |
Replacements:
| HK | 16 | Ryan Elias | | (substituted on) 57' |
| PR | 17 | Nicky Smith | | (substituted on) 45' |
| PR | 18 | Archie Griffin | | (substituted on) 57' |
| LK | 19 | Adam Beard | | (substituted on) 57' |
| FL | 20 | Olly Cracknell | | (substituted on) 45' |
| SH | 21 | Kieran Hardy |
| FH | 22 | Jarrod Evans |
| CE | 23 | Louie Hennessey | | (substituted on) 70' |
Coach:
Steve Tandy

Player of the Match:
Jack Conan (Ireland)

Assistant referees:
Nika Amashukeli (Georgia)
Damián Schneider (Argentina)
Television match official:
Andrew Jackson (England)
Foul play review officer:
Tual Trainini (France)

Notes:

- Jamison Gibson-Park (Ireland) earned his 50th test cap.
- Nathan Doak (Ireland) and Louie Hennessey (Wales) both made their international debut.

7 March 2026
14:10 GMT

| (1 BP) Scotland | 50–40 | France (1 BP) |
| Try: Graham (2) 5' c, 59' c Steyn (2) 26' m, 51' c Schoeman 32' c White 44' c Jordan 63' c Con: Russell (6/7) 6', 34', 45', 52', 60', 64'; Pen: Russell (1/1) 78' | Report | Try: Bielle-Biarrey 18' c Attissogbe 22' c Dupont 66' c Ramos (2) 74' m, 80+1' c Jegou 78' c Con: Ramos (5/6) 9', 23', 67', 79', 80+2' |

Murrayfield Stadium, Edinburgh
Attendance: 67,144
Referee: Angus Gardner (Australia)

| FB | 15 | Blair Kinghorn |
| RW | 14 | Darcy Graham |
| OC | 13 | Huw Jones | | (substituted off) 56' |
| IC | 12 | Sione Tuipulotu (c) |
| LW | 11 | Kyle Steyn | | (substituted off) 67' |
| FH | 10 | Finn Russell |
| SH | 9 | Ben White | | (substituted off) 64' |
| N8 | 8 | Jack Dempsey |
| OF | 7 | Rory Darge |
| BF | 6 | Matt Fagerson |
| RL | 5 | Scott Cummings | | (substituted off) 52' |
| LL | 4 | Gregor Brown | | (substituted off) 34' |
| TP | 3 | D'Arcy Rae | | (substituted off) 40' |
| HK | 2 | George Turner | | (substituted off) 52' |
| LP | 1 | Pierre Schoeman | | (substituted off) 64' |
Replacements:
| HK | 16 | Ewan Ashman | | (substituted on) 52' |
| PR | 17 | Rory Sutherland | | (substituted on) 64' |
| PR | 18 | Zander Fagerson | | (substituted on) 40' |
| LK | 19 | Grant Gilchrist | | (substituted on) 34' |
| FL | 20 | Freddy Douglas | | (substituted on) 67' |
| FL | 21 | Josh Bayliss | (yellow card) 78' | (substituted on) 52' |
| SH | 22 | George Horne | | (substituted on) 64' |
| FH | 23 | Tom Jordan | | (substituted on) 56' |
Coach:
Gregor Townsend

| FB | 15 | Thomas Ramos |
| RW | 14 | Théo Attissogbe |
| OC | 13 | Nicolas Depoortère | | (substituted off) 45' |
| IC | 12 | Yoram Moefana |
| LW | 11 | Louis Bielle-Biarrey |
| FH | 10 | Matthieu Jalibert | (yellow card) 32' |
| SH | 9 | Antoine Dupont (c) | | (substituted off) 70' |
| N8 | 8 | Anthony Jelonch | | (substituted off) 43' |
| OF | 7 | Oscar Jégou |
| BF | 6 | François Cros |
| RL | 5 | Mickaël Guillard | | (substituted off) 45' |
| LL | 4 | Charles Ollivon | | (substituted off) 45' |
| TP | 3 | Dorian Aldegheri | | (substituted off) 52' |
| HK | 2 | Julien Marchand | | (substituted off) 45' |
| LP | 1 | Jean-Baptiste Gros | | (substituted off) 52' |
Replacements:
| HK | 16 | Peato Mauvaka | | (substituted on) 45' |
| PR | 17 | Rodrigue Neti | | (substituted on) 52' |
| PR | 18 | Demba Bamba | | (substituted on) 52' |
| LK | 19 | Thibaud Flament | | (substituted on) 45' |
| LK | 20 | Emmanuel Meafou | | (substituted on) 45' |
| FL | 21 | Lenni Nouchi | (yellow card) 58' | (substituted on) 43' |
| SH | 22 | Baptiste Serin | | (substituted on) 70' |
| CE | 23 | Pierre-Louis Barassi | | (substituted on) 45' |
Coach:
Fabien Galthié

Player of the Match:
Kyle Steyn (Scotland)

Assistant referees:
Andrew Brace (Ireland)
Craig Evans (Wales)
Television match official:
Brett Cronan (Australia)
Foul play review officer:
Olly Hodges (Ireland)

Notes:

- Scotland reclaimed the Auld Alliance Trophy, having lost the previous four editions.
- Scotland's total of 50 points was their highest recorded against France.
- The combined score of 90 was the highest combined between the two teams.
- Baptiste Serin (France) earned his 50th test cap.
- France scored the most points in a loss in the Six Nations, breaking their own record from 2015, scoring 35 points in a 55–35 loss to England.

7 March 2026
17:40 CET

| Italy | 23–18 | England (1 BP) |
| Try: Menoncello 34' c Marin 72' c Con: P. Garbisi (2/2) 35', 73'; Pen: P. Garbisi (3/3) 21', 57', 61' | Report | Try: Freeman 26' m Roebuck 42' c Con: F. Smith (1/2) 43'; Pen: F. Smith (2/2) 45', 54' |

Stadio Olimpico, Rome
Attendance: 68,985
Referee: Luc Ramos (France)

| FB | 15 | Lorenzo Pani | | (substituted off) 74' |
| RW | 14 | Louis Lynagh |
| OC | 13 | Ignacio Brex | | (substituted off) 51' |
| IC | 12 | Tommaso Menoncello |
| LW | 11 | Monty Ioane |
| FH | 10 | Paolo Garbisi |
| SH | 9 | Alessandro Garbisi | | (substituted off) 51' |
| N8 | 8 | Lorenzo Cannone |
| OF | 7 | Manuel Zuliani | | (substituted off) 74' |
| BF | 6 | Michele Lamaro (c) |
| RL | 5 | Andrea Zambonin | | (substituted off) 50' |
| LL | 4 | Niccolò Cannone |
| TP | 3 | Simone Ferrari | | (substituted off) 51' |
| HK | 2 | Giacomo Nicotera | (yellow card) 52' | (substituted off) 63' |
| LP | 1 | Danilo Fischetti | | (substituted off) 58' | (substituted on) 80' |
Replacements:
| HK | 16 | Tommaso Di Bartolomeo | | (substituted on) 63' |
| PR | 17 | Mirco Spagnolo | | (substituted on) 58' | (substituted off) 80' |
| PR | 18 | Muhamed Hasa | | (substituted on) 51' |
| LK | 19 | Federico Ruzza | | (substituted on) 50' |
| LK | 20 | Riccardo Favretto | | (substituted on) 74' |
| SH | 21 | Alessandro Fusco | | (substituted on) 51' |
| FH | 22 | Leonardo Marin | | (substituted on) 51' |
| FH | 23 | Tommaso Allan | | (substituted on) 74' |
Coach:
Gonzalo Quesada

| FB | 15 | Elliot Daly | | (substituted off) 74' |
| RW | 14 | Tom Roebuck |
| OC | 13 | Tommy Freeman |
| IC | 12 | Seb Atkinson |
| LW | 11 | Cadan Murley |
| FH | 10 | Fin Smith |
| SH | 9 | Ben Spencer | | (substituted off) 58' |
| N8 | 8 | Ben Earl | | (substituted off) 74' |
| OF | 7 | Sam Underhill | (yellow card) 55' | (substituted off) 67' |
| BF | 6 | Guy Pepper | | (substituted off) 76' |
| RL | 5 | Alex Coles |
| LL | 4 | Maro Itoje (c) | (yellow card) 64' |
| TP | 3 | Joe Heyes | | (substituted off) 68' |
| HK | 2 | Jamie George | | (substituted off) 76' |
| LP | 1 | Ellis Genge | | (substituted off) 67' |
Replacements:
| HK | 16 | Luke Cowan-Dickie | | (substituted on) 76' |
| PR | 17 | Bevan Rodd | | (substituted on) 58' |
| PR | 18 | Trevor Davison | | (substituted on) 68' |
| LK | 19 | Ollie Chessum | | (substituted on) 67' |
| FL | 20 | Chandler Cunningham-South | | (substituted on) 76' |
| N8 | 21 | Henry Pollock | | (substituted on) 74' |
| SH | 22 | Jack van Poortvliet | | (substituted on) 58' |
| FH | 23 | Marcus Smith | | (substituted on) 74' |
Coach:
Steve Borthwick

Player of the Match:
Tommaso Menoncello (Italy)

Assistant referees:
Pierre Brousset (France)
Sam Grove-White (Scotland) (Note: Nic Berry (Australia) was originally named as AR1 for the match between Italy and England. However, due to travel disruption in the Middle East caused by the 2026 Iran war, Berry was unable to travel to Europe from Australia. As a result, Pierre Brousset stepped up to AR1, and Sam Grove-White took his place as AR2.)
Television match official:
Eric Gauzins (France)
Foul play review officer:
Ben Whitehouse (Wales)

Notes:

- Tom Curry (England) was injured in the warm-up and replaced in the starting line-up by Sam Underhill, whose place on the bench was taken by Chandler Cunningham-South.
- Ben Earl (England) earned his 50th test cap.
- This was Italy's first-ever win over England after 32 consecutive defeats.

=== Round 5 ===
14 March 2026
14:10 GMT

| (1 BP) Ireland | 43–21 | Scotland |
| Try: Osborne 3' c Sheehan 11' c Baloucoune 19' m Murray 57' c O'Brien (2) 68' c, 80' c Con: Crowley (5/6) 4', 11', 57', 69', 80+1'; Pen: Crowley (1/1) 73' | Report | Try: Graham 7' c Russell 52' c Darge 61' c Con: Russell (3/3) 8', 53', 62' |

Aviva Stadium, Dublin
Attendance: 51,700
Referee: Luke Pearce (England)

| FB | 15 | Jamie Osborne |
| RW | 14 | Robert Baloucoune | (substituted off) 66' |
| OC | 13 | Garry Ringrose | (substituted off) 66' |
| IC | 12 | Stuart McCloskey |
| LW | 11 | Tommy O'Brien |
| FH | 10 | Jack Crowley |
| SH | 9 | Jamison Gibson-Park | (substituted off) 78' |
| N8 | 8 | Caelan Doris (c) |
| OF | 7 | Josh van der Flier | (substituted off) 54' |
| BF | 6 | Jack Conan |
| RL | 5 | Tadhg Beirne | (substituted off) 51' | (substituted on) 62' |
| LL | 4 | Joe McCarthy | | | (substituted off) 66' |
| TP | 3 | Tadhg Furlong | (substituted off) 66' |
| HK | 2 | Dan Sheehan | (substituted off) 65' |
| LP | 1 | Tom O'Toole | (substituted off) 65' |
Replacements:
| HK | 16 | Rónan Kelleher | (substituted on) 65' |
| PR | 17 | Michael Milne | (substituted on) 65' |
| PR | 18 | Finlay Bealham | (substituted on) 66' |
| LK | 19 | Darragh Murray | (substituted on) 51' | (substituted off) 62' | (substituted on) 66' |
| FL | 20 | Nick Timoney | (substituted on) 54' |
| SH | 21 | Craig Casey | (substituted on) 78' |
| CE | 22 | Ciarán Frawley | (substituted on) 66' |
| CE | 23 | Bundee Aki | (substituted on) 66' |
Coach:
Andy Farrell

| FB | 15 | Blair Kinghorn |
| RW | 14 | Darcy Graham | (substituted off) 62' |
| OC | 13 | Huw Jones |
| IC | 12 | Sione Tuipulotu (c) |
| LW | 11 | Kyle Steyn |
| FH | 10 | Finn Russell |
| SH | 9 | Ben White | (substituted off) 62' |
| N8 | 8 | Jack Dempsey | (substituted off) 62' |
| OF | 7 | Rory Darge |
| BF | 6 | Matt Fagerson |
| RL | 5 | Grant Gilchrist |
| LL | 4 | Max Williamson | (substituted off) 62' |
| TP | 3 | Zander Fagerson | (substituted off) 69' |
| HK | 2 | George Turner | (substituted off) 18' |
| LP | 1 | Pierre Schoeman | (substituted off) 69' |
Replacements:
| HK | 16 | Ewan Ashman | (substituted on) 18' |
| PR | 17 | Rory Sutherland | (substituted on) 69' |
| PR | 18 | D'Arcy Rae | (substituted on) 69' |
| LK | 19 | Alex Craig | (substituted on) 62' |
| FL | 20 | Magnus Bradbury | (substituted on) 62' |
| SH | 21 | George Horne | (substituted on) 62' |
| WG | 22 | Kyle Rowe | (substituted on) 62' | (substituted off) 69' |
| FH | 23 | Tom Jordan | | (substituted on) 69' |
Coach:
Gregor Townsend

Player of the Match:
Caelan Doris (Ireland)

Assistant referees:
Angus Gardner (Australia)
Damián Schneider (Argentina)
Television match official:
Andrew Jackson (England)
Foul play review officer:
Ian Tempest (England)

Notes:

- Ireland retained both the Triple Crown and Centenary Quaich.
- This was Ireland's equal-biggest home win over Scotland, equalling their win in 2014.

14 March 2026
16:40 GMT

| (1 BP) Wales | 31–17 | Italy |
| Try: Wainwright (2) 15' c, 25' c Lake 29' c Edwards 44' c Con: Edwards (4/4) 16', 26', 30', 45'; Drop: Edwards (1/1) 48' | Report | Try: Di Bartolomeo 52' c Allan 69' m P. Garbisi 81' m Con: P. Garbisi (1/3) 53' |

Millennium Stadium, Cardiff
Attendance: 69,775
Referee: Christophe Ridley (England)

| FB | 15 | Louis Rees-Zammit |
| RW | 14 | Ellis Mee | (substituted off) 79' |
| OC | 13 | Eddie James |
| IC | 12 | Joe Hawkins |
| LW | 11 | Josh Adams |
| FH | 10 | Dan Edwards | (substituted off) 68' |
| SH | 9 | Tomos Williams | (substituted off) 78' |
| N8 | 8 | Aaron Wainwright |
| OF | 7 | James Botham |
| BF | 6 | Alex Mann | (substituted off) 71' |
| RL | 5 | Ben Carter | (substituted off) 64' |
| LL | 4 | Dafydd Jenkins |
| TP | 3 | Tomas Francis | (substituted off) 38' |
| HK | 2 | Dewi Lake (c) | (substituted off) 45' |
| LP | 1 | Rhys Carré | (substituted off) 51' |
Replacements:
| HK | 16 | Ryan Elias | (substituted on) 45' |
| PR | 17 | Nicky Smith | (substituted on) 51' |
| PR | 18 | Archie Griffin | (substituted on) 38' |
| LK | 19 | Adam Beard | (substituted on) 64' |
| FL | 20 | Olly Cracknell | (substituted on) 71' |
| SH | 21 | Kieran Hardy | (substituted on) 78' |
| FH | 22 | Jarrod Evans | (substituted on) 68' |
| FB | 23 | Blair Murray | (substituted on) 79' |
Coach:
Steve Tandy

| FB | 15 | Lorenzo Pani | (substituted off) 63' |
| RW | 14 | Louis Lynagh |
| OC | 13 | Ignacio Brex | (substituted off) 70' |
| IC | 12 | Tommaso Menoncello |
| LW | 11 | Monty Ioane |
| FH | 10 | Paolo Garbisi |
| SH | 9 | Alessandro Fusco | (substituted off) 54' |
| N8 | 8 | Lorenzo Cannone | (substituted off) 63' |
| OF | 7 | Manuel Zuliani |
| BF | 6 | Michele Lamaro (c) |
| RL | 5 | Federico Ruzza |
| LL | 4 | Niccolò Cannone | (substituted off) 70' |
| TP | 3 | Muhamed Hasa | (substituted off) 45' |
| HK | 2 | Giacomo Nicotera | (substituted off) 45' | (substituted on) 61' |
| LP | 1 | Danilo Fischetti | (substituted off) 45' |
Replacements:
| HK | 16 | Tommaso Di Bartolomeo | (substituted on) 45' | (substituted off) 61' |
| PR | 17 | Mirco Spagnolo | (substituted on) 45' |
| PR | 18 | Giosuè Zilocchi | (substituted on) 45' |
| LK | 19 | Riccardo Favretto | (substituted on) 70' |
| FL | 20 | David Odiase | (substituted on) 63' |
| SH | 21 | Stephen Varney | (substituted on) 54' |
| FH | 22 | Leonardo Marin | (substituted on) 70' |
| FH | 23 | Tommaso Allan | (substituted on) 63' |
Coach:
Gonzalo Quesada

Player of the Match:
Aaron Wainwright (Wales)

Assistant referees:
Matthew Carley (England)
Eoghan Cross (Ireland)
Television match official:
Mike Adamson (Scotland)
Foul play review officer:
Eric Gauzins (France)

Notes:

- Wales recorded their first Six Nations win in 16 matches, last winning against Italy in 2023, and their first home win in the Championship since winning against Scotland in 2022.

14 March 2026
21:10 CET

| (1 BP) France | 48–46 | England (2 BP) |
| Try: Bielle-Biarrey (4) 7' c, 13' c, 42' c, 66' c Penalty try 40'; Attissogbe 49' c Con: Ramos (5/5) 8', 14', 43', 50', 66'; Pen: Ramos (2/2) 23', 83' | Report | Try: Roebuck 10' m Murley 19' m Chessum (2) 26' c, 51' m Coles 34' c M. Smith 57' c Freeman 77' c Con: F. Smith (2/5) 27', 35'; M. Smith (2/2) 58', 78'; Pen: F. Smith (1/1) 38' |

Stade de France, Saint-Denis
Attendance: 78,728
Referee: Nika Amashukeli (Georgia) (Note: Nic Berry (Australia) was originally named as the referee for the match between France and England. However, due to travel disruption in the Middle East caused by the 2026 Iran war, Berry was unable to travel to Europe from Australia. As a result, Nika Amashukeli stepped up to referee, and Andrew Brace took his place as AR1.)

| FB | 15 | Thomas Ramos |
| RW | 14 | Théo Attissogbe |
| OC | 13 | Pierre-Louis Barassi |
| IC | 12 | Yoram Moefana |
| LW | 11 | Louis Bielle-Biarrey |
| FH | 10 | Matthieu Jalibert |
| SH | 9 | Antoine Dupont (c) |
| N8 | 8 | Charles Ollivon |
| OF | 7 | Temo Matiu | | (substituted off) 40' |
| BF | 6 | François Cros |
| RL | 5 | Emmanuel Meafou | | (substituted off) 66' |
| LL | 4 | Thibaud Flament |
| TP | 3 | Dorian Aldegheri | | (substituted off) 46' |
| HK | 2 | Julien Marchand | | (substituted off) 46' |
| LP | 1 | Jean-Baptiste Gros | | (substituted off) 62' |
Replacements:
| HK | 16 | Peato Mauvaka | | (substituted on) 46' |
| PR | 17 | Rodrigue Neti | | (substituted on) 62' |
| PR | 18 | Demba Bamba | (yellow card) 72' | (substituted on) 46' |
| LK | 19 | Hugo Auradou |
| LK | 20 | Mickaël Guillard | | (substituted on) 40' |
| LK | 21 | Joshua Brennan | | (substituted on) 66' |
| SH | 22 | Baptiste Serin |
| CE | 23 | Émilien Gailleton |
Coach:
Fabien Galthié

| FB | 15 | Elliot Daly | | (substituted off) 54' |
| RW | 14 | Tom Roebuck |
| OC | 13 | Tommy Freeman |
| IC | 12 | Seb Atkinson |
| LW | 11 | Cadan Murley |
| FH | 10 | Fin Smith |
| SH | 9 | Ben Spencer | | (substituted off) 51' |
| N8 | 8 | Ben Earl | | (substituted off) 37' | (substituted on) 40' | (substituted off) 43' | (substituted on) 51' | (substituted off) 75' |
| OF | 7 | Guy Pepper | | (substituted off) 62' |
| BF | 6 | Ollie Chessum |
| RL | 5 | Alex Coles | | | | (substituted off) 54' |
| LL | 4 | Maro Itoje (c) |
| TP | 3 | Joe Heyes | | (substituted off) 75' |
| HK | 2 | Jamie George | | (substituted off) 51' |
| LP | 1 | Ellis Genge | (yellow card) 41' | | | | | (substituted off) 75' |
Replacements:
| HK | 16 | Luke Cowan-Dickie | | (substituted on) 51' |
| PR | 17 | Bevan Rodd | | | | (substituted on) 43' | (substituted off) 51' | (substituted on) 75' |
| PR | 18 | Trevor Davison | | (substituted on) 75' |
| FL | 19 | Chandler Cunningham-South | | | | | | (substituted on) 75' |
| FL | 20 | Sam Underhill | | (substituted on) 62' |
| N8 | 21 | Henry Pollock | | (substituted on) 37' | (substituted off) 40' | (substituted on) 54' |
| SH | 22 | Jack van Poortvliet | | (substituted on) 51' |
| FH | 23 | Marcus Smith | | (substituted on) 54' |
Coach:
Steve Borthwick

Player of the Match:
Louis Bielle-Biarrey (France)

Assistant referees:
Andrew Brace (Ireland)
Hollie Davidson (Scotland)
Television match official:
Brett Cronan (Australia)
Foul play review officer:
Matteo Liperini (Italy)

- This game was both the highest away score for England against France, and the highest home score for France against England. It was also the highest aggregate score (94 points) in 113 games between the teams.
- England scored the most points in a loss in the Six Nations, surpassing France's 40 points in the previous round.
- Marcus Smith and Sam Underhill (both England) earned their 50th test caps.
- Louis Bielle-Biarrey became the second player in the Six Nations era to score four tries in one match, equalling Chris Ashton for England against Italy in 2011.
- Louis Bielle-Biarrey broke the record for most tries in a single Championship (9 tries).
- With this result, England finished in fifth place, their worst position since the Championship became the Six Nations in 2000. It was also the first time since 1987 that England had only secured one win in any of the Championship incarnations.

== Player statistics ==
=== Most points ===
As of 13 March 2026

| Rank | Name | Team | Points |
|---|---|---|---|
| 1 | Thomas Ramos | France | 74 |
| 2 | Finn Russell | Scotland | 53 |
| 3 | Jack Crowley | Ireland | 47 |
| 4 | Louis Bielle-Biarrey | France | 45 |
| 5 | Paolo Garbisi | Italy | 39 |
| 6 | George Ford | England | 27 |
| 6 | Dan Edwards | Wales | 27 |
| 8 | Théo Attissogbe | France | 25 |
| 9 | Henry Arundell | England | 20 |
| 9 | Jamie Osborne | Ireland | 20 |
| 9 | Darcy Graham | Scotland | 20 |

=== Most tries ===
As of 13 March 2026

| Rank | Name | Team | Tries |
|---|---|---|---|
| 1 | Louis Bielle-Biarrey | France | 9 |
| 2 | Théo Attissogbe | France | 5 |
| 3 | Henry Arundell | England | 4 |
| 3 | Jamie Osborne | Ireland | 4 |
| 3 | Darcy Graham | Scotland | 4 |
| 6 | Thomas Ramos | France | 3 |
| 6 | Robert Baloucoune | Ireland | 3 |
| 6 | Rhys Carré | Wales | 3 |
| 6 | Tommy O'Brien | Ireland | 3 |
| 6 | Kyle Steyn | Scotland | 3 |
| 6 | Tom Roebuck | England | 3 |
| 6 | Tommy Freeman | England | 3 |

== Discipline ==
=== Summary ===
As of 13 March 2026

| Team | Yellow card | Red card | Total |
|---|---|---|---|
| England | 8 | 1 | 9 |
| Wales | 7 | 0 | 7 |
| Italy | 3 | 0 | 3 |
| France | 3 | 0 | 3 |
| Ireland | 2 | 0 | 2 |
| Scotland | 2 | 0 | 2 |

=== Red cards ===
- (England) Henry Arundell (vs. Scotland)

=== Yellow cards ===
2 yellow cards

- (Italy) Louis Lynagh (vs. Ireland, vs. France)
- (England) Maro Itoje (vs. Wales, vs. Italy)

1 yellow card

- (England) Henry Arundell (vs. Scotland)
- (England) Tom Curry (vs. Wales)
- (England) Sam Underhill (vs. Italy)
- (England) Henry Pollock (vs. Ireland)
- (England) Freddie Steward (vs. Ireland)
- (England) Ellis Genge (vs. France)
- (France) Matthieu Jalibert (vs. Scotland)
- (France) Lenni Nouchi (vs. Scotland)
- (France) Demba Bamba (vs. England)
- (Ireland) Craig Casey (vs. Italy)
- (Ireland) Jamie Osborne (vs. England)
- (Italy) Giacomo Nicotera (vs. England)
- (Scotland) George Turner (vs. Italy)
- (Scotland) Josh Bayliss (vs. France)
- (Wales) Joe Hawkins (vs. Scotland)
- (Wales) Dewi Lake (vs. England)
- (Wales) Taine Plumtree (vs. England)
- (Wales) Nicky Smith (vs. England)
- (Wales) Ben Thomas (vs. England)
- (Wales) Tomos Williams (vs. Ireland)
- (Wales) Archie Griffin (vs. Italy)

=== Citings/bans ===
| Player | Match | Law breached | Result | Ref |
|---|---|---|---|---|
| Henry Arundell | Scotland vs. **England** (Round 2 – 14 February 2026) | 9.27 – 2 yellow cards (red card) | Sending-off sufficient | |
| Oscar Jégou | Scotland vs. **France** (Round 4 – 7 March 2026) | 9.12 – Physical/verbal abuse | Four-match ban | |

Note: The cited player's team is listed in bold italics.

== Awards ==
=== Player of the championship ===
The official shortlist for player of the championship was announced on 20 March 2026. Louis Bielle-Biarrey was announced as Player of the Championship, his second successive award, on 2 April 2026.

| Position | Nominee | Nation |
|---|---|---|
| Winger | Louis Bielle-Biarrey | France |
| Winger | Kyle Steyn | Scotland |
| Centre | Tommaso Menoncello | Italy |
| Centre | Stuart McCloskey | Ireland |

=== Team of the championship ===
The official team of the championship was announced on 19 March 2026. The selection included four Irishmen, four Frenchman, three Italians, three Scots and a Welshman. The England team were unrepresented.

Forwards
| No. | Team | Player |
|---|---|---|
| 1 | Wales | Rhys Carre |
| 2 | Italy | Giacomo Nicotera |
| 3 | Italy | Simone Ferrari |
| 4 | Ireland | Tadhg Beirne |
| 5 | France | Mickaël Guillard |
| 6 | Ireland | Jack Conan |
| 7 | Scotland | Rory Darge |
| 8 | Ireland | Caelan Doris |

Backs
| No. | Team | Player |
|---|---|---|
| 9 | France | Antoine Dupont |
| 10 | Scotland | Finn Russell |
| 11 | France | Louis Bielle-Biarrey |
| 12 | Ireland | Stuart McCloskey |
| 13 | Italy | Tommaso Menoncello |
| 14 | Scotland | Kyle Steyn |
| 15 | France | Thomas Ramos |

=== Player of the Match awards ===
| Awards | Player | Team | Opponent |
|---|---|---|---|
| 2 | Kyle Steyn | Scotland | England ^{(R2)} |
| 2 | Kyle Steyn | Scotland | France ^{(R4)} |
| 1 | Mickaël Guillard | France | Ireland ^{(R1)} |
| 1 | Simone Ferrari | Italy | Scotland ^{(R1)} |
| 1 | George Ford | England | Wales ^{(R1)} |
| 1 | Robert Baloucoune | Ireland | Italy ^{(R2)} |
| 1 | Matthieu Jalibert | France | Wales ^{(R2)} |
| 1 | Jamison Gibson-Park | Ireland | England ^{(R3)} |
| 1 | Rory Darge | Scotland | Wales ^{(R3)} |
| 1 | Emmanuel Meafou | France | Italy ^{(R3)} |
| 1 | Jack Conan | Ireland | Wales ^{(R4)} |
| 1 | Tommaso Menoncello | Italy | England ^{(R4)} |
| 1 | Caelan Doris | Ireland | Scotland ^{(R5)} |
| 1 | Aaron Wainwright | Wales | Italy ^{(R5)} |
| 1 | Louis Bielle-Biarrey | France | England ^{(R5)} |

== See also ==
- 2026 Six Nations Under 20s Championship
- 2026 Women's Six Nations Championship
- 2026 Six Nations Women's U21 Series
- 2026 Nations Championship
