= Emmanuel Meafou =

France international rugby union player

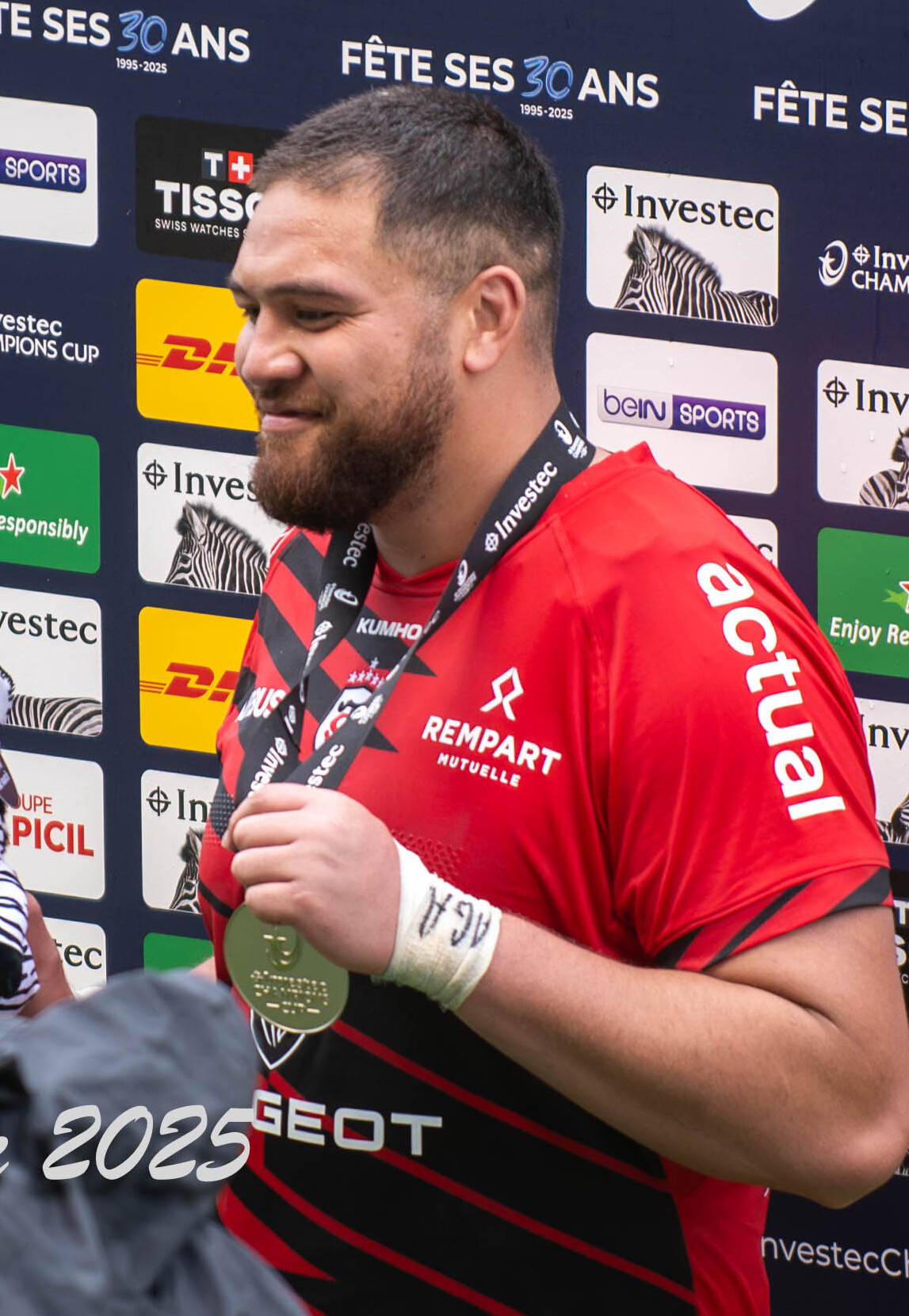
- Meafou with Toulouse in the 2024–25 European Rugby Champions Cup
- Full name: Emmanuel Latu-Meafou
- Born: 12 July 1998 (age 28) Auckland, New Zealand
- Height: 2.03 m (6 ft 8 in)
- Weight: 145 kg (320 lb; 22 st 12 lb)
- School: Ipswich Grammar School
- Notable relative: Abigail Latu-Meafou (sister)

Rugby union career
- Position: Lock
- Current team: Toulouse
Senior career
Years	Team	Apps	(Points)
2017	Melbourne Rising	6	(0)
2018	Warringah	17	(15)
2018	NSW Country Eagles	7	(5)
2019–	Toulouse	100	(145)
- Correct as of 25 May 2024
International career
Years	Team	Apps	(Points)
2024–	France	16	(5)
- Correct as of 14 March 2026

Emmanuel Latu-Meafou (born 12 July 1998) is a professional rugby union player who plays as a lock for Top 14 club Toulouse and the France national team. Born in New Zealand to parents from Samoa, before moving to Australia where he was raised, he later obtained French nationality in 2023 and made his debut for his adoptive country in 2024.

== Early life ==
Emmanuel Latu-Meafou was born on 12 July 1998 in New Zealand to Samoan parents before moving to Sydney, Australia at two years old with his parents. Shortly afterwards, the family relocated to Queensland: first to Brisbane and then to Ipswich, where he grew up. His nickname is Manny.

At the age of five, he started playing rugby league at Ipswich Grammar School in South East Queensland. He only switched to rugby union at sixteen years old, playing for Brothers. In 2015, Meafou was selected to play for the Queensland II side in the Australian Schools Rugby Championships.

== Club career ==
In 2017, Meafou first played for National Rugby Championship professional team Melbourne Rising before, one year after, playing for both Shute Shield side Warringah and NSW Country Eagles.

Following the 2018 season, having no offers to pursue his professional career in rugby, he had a brief opportunity to switch to American football and play in the National Football League via the International Player Pathway Program. Meafou stated: "Rugby was still a passion and dream of mine. The only reason I went down the NFL road was because I had no offers. For me rugby was over."

=== Toulouse ===
After his agent reportedly sent footage of Meafou to French rugby clubs, they received several positive responses and offers before joining Toulouse's youth development system. He then left Australia for France in December 2018.

On 21 December 2019, he played his first professional game in France with his new club after having signed an Academy (U21) contract in January until 2021. The next season, he won the 2020–21 European Rugby Champions Cup and 2020-21 Top 14 double with the French team.

During the 2022–23, Meafou became a regular starter in the Toulouse tight five, playing 23 games and emerging as the cornerstone of the Red and Blacks' scrum. He also started with number 5 jersey in every Toulouse's European Rugby Champions Cup match. On 4 January 2023, he extended his contract with Toulouse until 2025, before winning his third Bouclier de Brennus in the Top 14 final against La Rochelle on 17 June.

== International career ==
"Oh man, I want to play for France. [...] France is definitely on my radar. There's been a little bit of discussion around it and I'm working towards getting my passport."

— Meafou in an interview to Le French Rugby Podcast reported by ESPN

Being born in New Zealand to parents from Samoa, before moving to Australia as a young child, Meafou is eligible to play for all three countries. Since his arrival in Toulouse in December 2018, Meafou has publicly declared his love of his new homeland and said he would like to play for France.

On 12 March 2023, he was called up to the France national team as an additional training player since he was not eligible to play for his adoptive country yet.

In April 2023, prior to making his debut for France, he was contacted by Eddie Jones to play for Australia ahead of the 2023 Rugby World Cup. He declined the offer in favour of playing for France.

On 17 January 2024, he was called up to the France national team for the 2024 Six Nations Championship by head coach Fabien Galthié. On 8 March 2024, having been unavailable for selection in the first three rounds due to injury, he was named in the starting side to face Wales.

=== List of international tries ===
International tries
No.	Date	Venue	Opponent	Score	Result	Competition
1	22 February 2026	Stade Pierre-Mauroy, Villeneuve-d'Ascq, France	Italy	12–0	33–8	2026 Six Nations

== Personal life ==
"I have been in France for five years, these were the best years of my life. This country really touches my heart. [...] When I arrived here, people always have open arms and I hope to stay there for a long time. I am very proud to be French but I am proud to be from Toulouse too."

— Meafou in an interview after his naturalisation

Meafou and his wife Jada have a son, born in France in December 2023. In 2022, he passed a French language exam in order to become a French citizen. After nearly five years living in France and playing for Toulouse, he was granted French citizenship on 9 November 2023, after a French naturalisation ceremony that took place at the Capitole de Toulouse.

Meafou is close to former Toulouse players Piula Faʻasalele, Joe Tekori, Jerome Kaino and Charlie Faumuina as well as current teammate Pita Ahki who helped him to acclimatize himself to France. He is also friends with La Rochelle lock Will Skelton.

Meafou is a devout Christian, thanking Jesus christ during his player of the match interview when playing for France against Italy in the six nations on the 22nd February 2026.

== Honours ==
France

- Six Nations Championship
  - (gold) Champion (2): 2025, 2026

Toulouse

- European Rugby Champions Cup
  - (gold) Champion (2): 2020–21, 2023–24
- Top 14
  - (gold) Champion (4): 2018–19, 2020–21, 2022–23, 2023–24

Warringah

- Shute Shield
  - (silver) Runner-up (1): 2018
