= Nicky Smith (rugby union) =

Wales international rugby union player

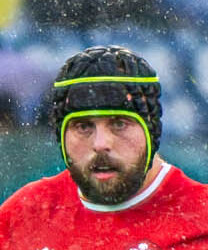
- Smith in 2025
- Born: Nicky Smith; 7 April 1994 (age 32) Swansea, Wales
- Height: 6 ft 0 in (183 cm)
- Weight: 119 kg (262 lb; 18 st 10 lb)
- School: Gower College Swansea; Pentrehafod Comprehensive School

Rugby union career
- Position: Loosehead Prop
- Current team: Leicester Tigers
Amateur team(s)
Years	Team	Apps	(Points)
- Waunarlwydd
2012–2014	Swansea	31	(0)
2013–2014	Aberavon	2	(0)
Senior career
Years	Team	Apps	(Points)
2012–2024	Ospreys	191	(65)
2024–2026	Leicester Tigers	46	(10)
2026–	Sale Sharks		
- Correct as of 13 June 2026
International career
Years	Team	Apps	(Points)
2013–2014	Wales U20	15	(0)
2014–	Wales	63	(15)
- Correct as of 21 March 2026

Nicky Smith (born 7 April 1994) is a Welsh professional rugby union player. He plays prop for Sale Sharks in England's Premiership Rugby and has represented Wales 63 times. He previously played 191 times for Ospreys between 2012 and 2024, and 46 times in two seasons for Leicester Tigers between 2024 and 2026.

He has three sons who he shares with his wife Kirsty. He is the brother-in-law to Wales Women’s Rugby international Alisha Joyce-Butchers.

== Club career ==
He spent 12 seasons playing for his home town team, the Ospreys in the multi-national URC. He has also represented Aberavon RFC and Swansea RFC in the Welsh Premiership.

On 20 March 2024, Smith's signing was announced by Leicester Tigers. He made his debut on 21 September in a 17–14 win against Exeter Chiefs at Sandy Park.

He was picked in the Premiership team of the season for the 24-25 season.

In December 2025, it was announced that Smith would join Sale Sharks ahead of the 2026-27 season, signing a three-year deal.

== International career ==
Smith appeared for the Wales Under-20 team on 15 occasions, having made his debut against Ireland U20 during the 2013 Six Nations Under 20s Championship. He went on to play every match of the 2013 Championship, before being selected for the 2013 IRB Junior World Championship in France. Smith only played once during the U20s World Championship. Smith played in every match of the 2014 Six Nations Under 20s Championship and the 2014 IRB Junior World Championship in New Zealand.

In October 2014 he was named the Wales senior squad for the 2014 Autumn International series against Australia, Fiji, New Zealand and South Africa. Smith made his senior international debut for Wales on 15 November 2014 versus Fiji. He was chosen to start in Wales' Six Nations opener against Italy in Rome on 5 February 2017. He was a replacement for the four other fixtures in that championship.

He played in all five wins on the 2017 and 2018 summer tours and played in 12 of the 14 match unbeaten series between 2018-19, including four outings, and one start, in the 2019 Grand Slam campaign.

Smith was named in the squad for the 2026 Six Nations by Steve Tandy.

=== International tries ===
Try	Opponent	Location	Venue	Competition	Date	Result
1	Uruguay	Kumamoto, Japan	Egao Kenko Stadium	2019 Rugby World Cup	13 October 2019	Win
2	France	Paris, France	Stade de France	2020 Autumn Internationals	24 October 2020	Loss
3	Canada	Cardiff, Wales	Millennium Stadium	2021 Summer Internationals	3 July 2021	Win
