= Paolo Garbisi =

Italy international rugby union player

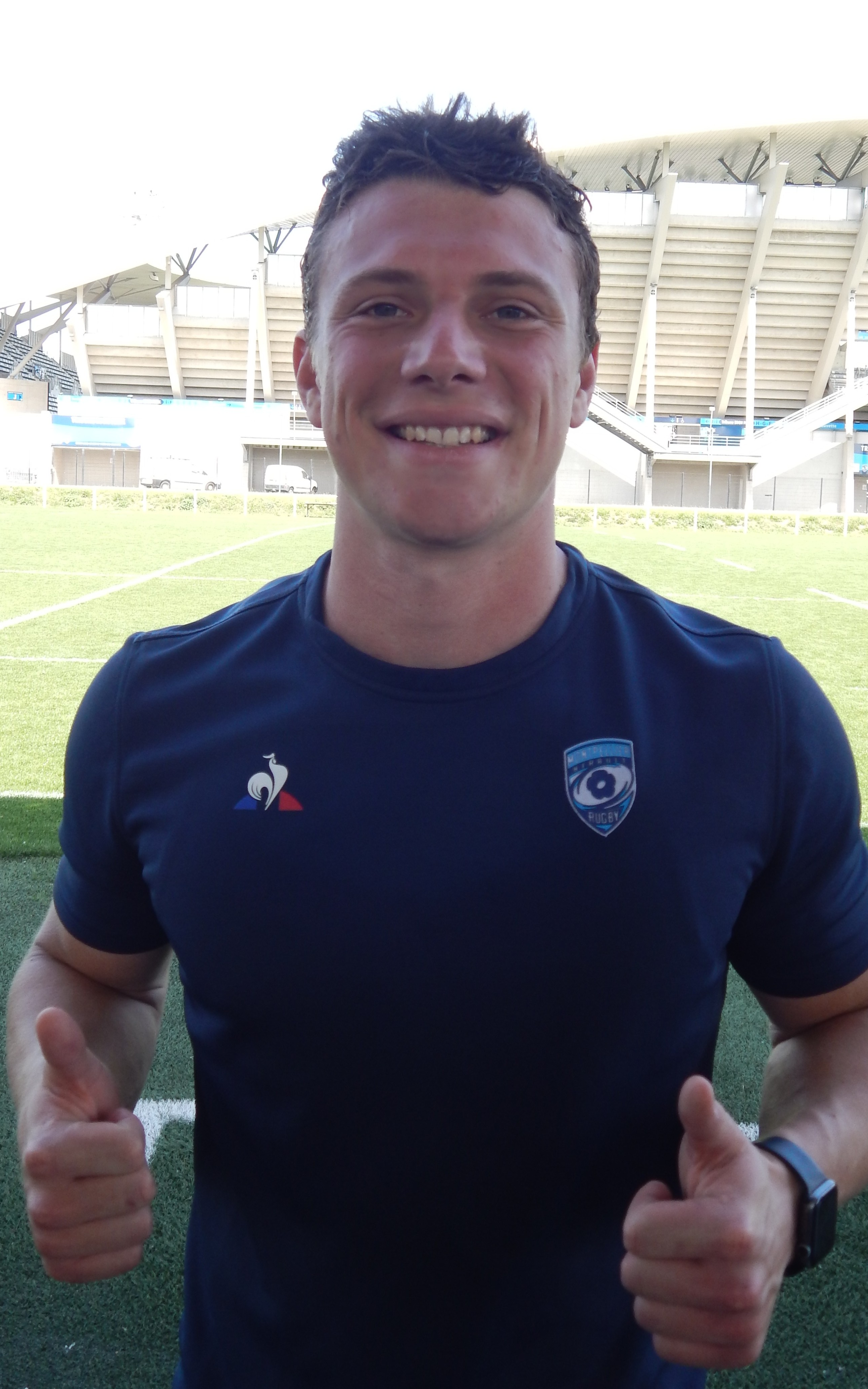
- Garbisi representing Montpellier, April 2022
- Born: 26 April 2000 (age 26) Venice, Italy
- Height: 182 cm (6 ft 0 in)
- Weight: 88 kg (194 lb; 13 st 12 lb)
- Notable relative: Alessandro Garbisi (brother)

Rugby union career
- Position: Fly-half
- Current team: USA Perpignan
Senior career
Years	Team	Apps	(Points)
2018	Mogliano	1	(0)
2019–2020	Petrarca	9	(77)
2020–2021	Benetton	12	(129)
2021–2024	Montpellier	55	(250)
2024–2026	Toulon	43	(45)
2026–	USA Perpignan	6	(22)
- Correct as of 31 October 2026
International career
Years	Team	Apps	(Points)
2019–2020	Italy U20	13	(77)
2020–	Italy	59	(317)
- Correct as of 14 November 2026

Paolo Garbisi (Italian pronunciation: [ɡarˈbiːzi]; born 26 April 2000) is an Italian professional rugby union player who primarily plays fly-half for French side USA Perpignan of the Top 14 and Italy at international level. He made his test debut against Ireland during the 2020 Six Nations Championship. Garbisi has also played at club level for Mogliano, Petrarca, Benetton, Montpellier and Toulon.

== Club career ==
Born in Venice, Garbisi first played rugby for Mogliano, before joining the FIR academy for the 2016–17, 2017-2018, and 2018-2019 seasons.

For the last matches of 2019–20 season and for 2020–21 season, Garbisi was signed by Benetton as permit player, along with some of his under-20 teammates, who were part of this successful Italian generation, having beaten teams such as Wales and Scotland.

== International career ==
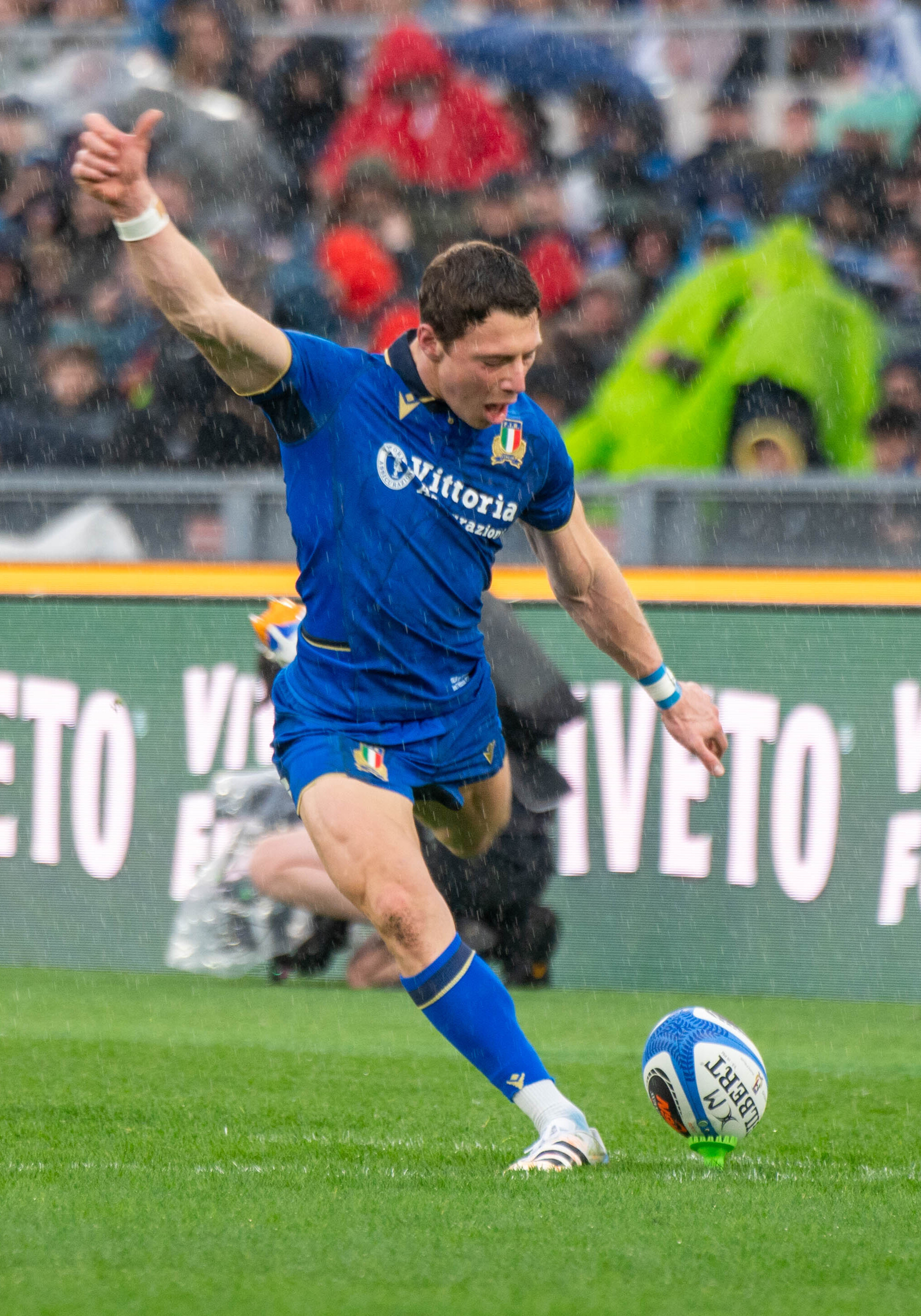
Garbisi kicking for Italy against Scotland in the 2026 Six Nations Championship.

Garbisi was part of both the under-17 and under-18 Italian national teams, featuring in a surprise win against England for the U18s. Garbisi was named in the Italy Under-20 squad for both the 2019 and 2020 Six Nations Under 20s Championship. He featured in the 2019 World Rugby Under 20 Championship, and was set to lead his country in the 2020 edition, before that it was canceled due to the COVID-19 pandemic.

In July 2020, he was selected for Italy for the first time by coach Franco Smith for a training camp. From October 2020 he is also part of Italy squad. In Italy's final match of the 2022 Six Nations Championship against Wales, Garbisi scored the winning conversion at the end of the match to win Italy's first Six Nations match since 2015 with a 22-21 scoreline.

On 22 August 2023, he was named in the Italy's 33-man squad for the 2023 Rugby World Cup.
