= Noah Nene =

French rugby union player (born 2004)

- Full name: Noah Tisie Nene
- Born: 14 October 2004 (age 22) Cachan, France
- Height: 1.92 m (6 ft 4 in)
- Weight: 103 kg (227 lb; 16 st 3 lb)

Rugby union career
- Position: Centre
- Current team: Stade Français
Youth career
- 2012–2023: Rugby Club Val de Bièvres
Senior career
Years	Team	Apps	(Points)
2023–	Stade Français	25	(50)
2024–2025	→ Dax (loan)	14	(15)
- Correct as of 22 September 2026
International career
Years	Team	Apps	(Points)
2024	France U20	1	(0)
2026–	France	1	(0)
- Correct as of 15 February 2026

Noah Tisie Nene (born 14 October 2004) is a French rugby union player, who plays for Stade Français and the French national team.

== Club career ==
Noah Nene first played association football – playing as a left-back for Cachan and even making the INF entry test – and judo, before starting rugby union aged 12.

He spent his rugby youth years with RC Val de Bièvre before joining Stade Français in 2022, after he went through trials with them the previous year.

After being a standout sevens player for Stade Français in the Supersevens, Nene made his professional Top 14 debut on the 30 December 2023 against Toulon.

For the 2024–25 season he was loaned to US Dax in Pro D2, where he became one of the highlights of the competition, under former France assistant coach Jeff Dubois.

== International career ==
Despite first missing the youth France teams through injury, Noah Nene was capped with France U20s against Ireland in the 2024 U20 Six Nations.

Nene was first called to the France senior team in January 2025 for the 2025 Six Nations Championship.

== Style of play ==
Mainly playing as an inside centre, Nene is able to play across the back line, from 10 to 15.

Described as a technically gifted ball-player with a powerful left foot, he first stood out for his athletic abilities, fast and explosive, despite above average measurements.

== Personal life ==
Born in France, Nene is of Ivorian descent.

== Honours ==
France

- 1x Six Nations Championship: 2026
