= Kyle Steyn =

Scotland international rugby union player (born 1994)

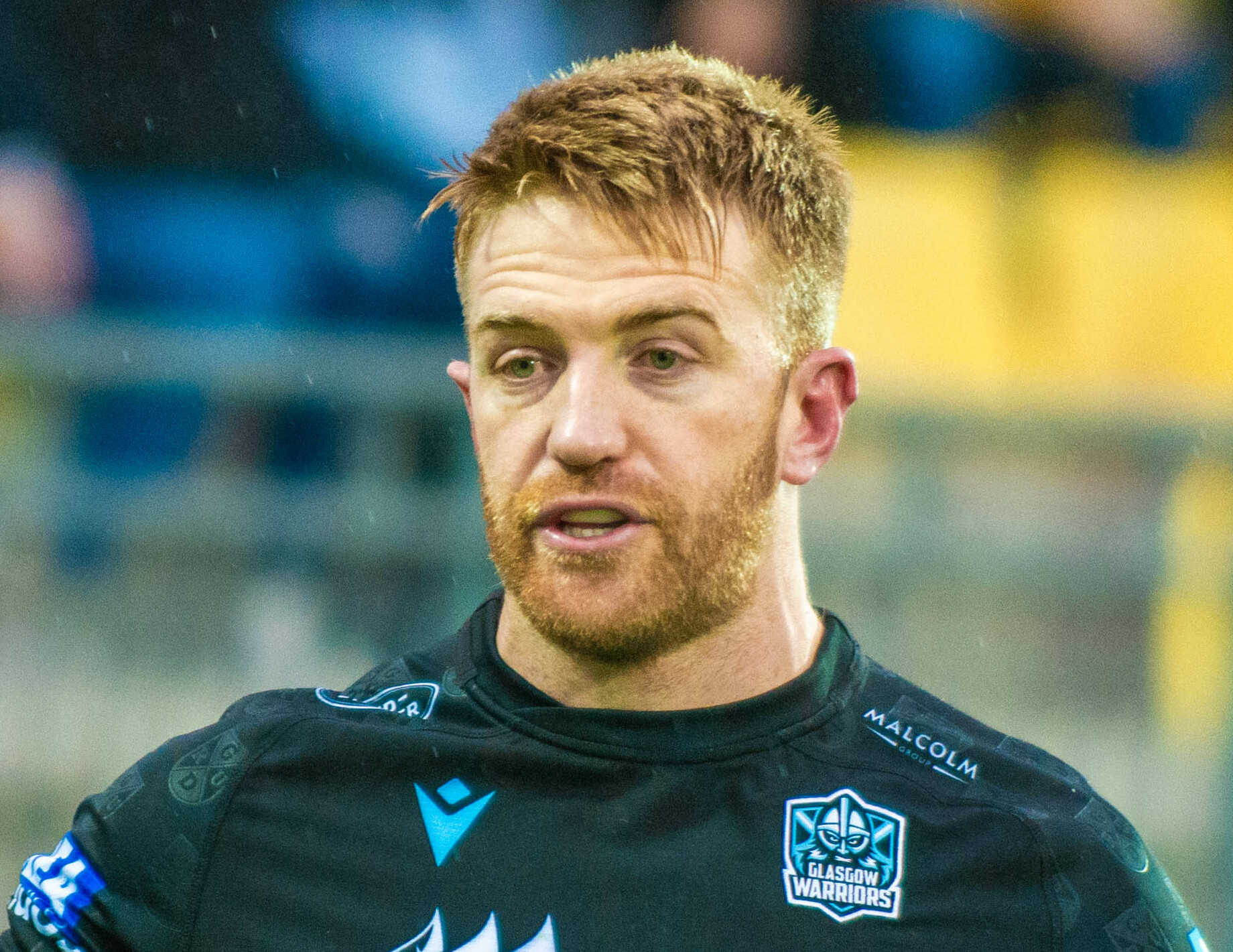
- Steyn representing Glasgow Warriors during the United Rugby Championship
- Full name: Kyle Douglas Steyn
- Born: 29 January 1994 (age 32) Johannesburg, South Africa
- Height: 1.88 m (6 ft 2 in)
- Weight: 102 kg (225 lb; 16 st 1 lb)
- School: Trinityhouse High School
- University: Stellenbosch University

Rugby union career
- Position(s): Wing, Centre
- Current team: Glasgow Warriors
Senior career
Years	Team	Apps	(Points)
2017–2018	Griquas	29	(80)
2019–	Glasgow Warriors	103	(185)
- Correct as of 8 March 2026
International career
Years	Team	Apps	(Points)
2018–2019	Scotland 7s	21	(0)
2020–	Scotland	37	(90)
- Correct as of 18 November 2026
Coaching career
- Years: Team
- 2025-: Glasgow Hawks (Skills)

Kyle Douglas Steyn (born 29 January 1994) is a professional rugby union player who plays as a wing for United Rugby Championship club Glasgow Warriors. Born in South Africa, he represents Scotland at international level after qualifying on ancestry grounds.

== Club career ==
Steyn represented Griquas in the Currie Cup and the Rugby Challenge in South Africa in 2017 and 2018.

He currently plays for United Rugby Championship club Glasgow Warriors. On 30 August 2022 he was named as the new captain of Glasgow Warriors by head coach Franco Smith.

== International career ==
Steyn was born in South Africa, and qualifies for Scotland representation through his Glaswegian mother. He has represented Scotland in rugby sevens since 2018.

In March 2019, Steyn was called up to Scotland's Six Nations squad prior to the Calcutta Cup match against England after injuries to fellow wings Blair Kinghorn and Tommy Seymour. He was called up again to the 2020 Six Nations Championship squad. He was given a full senior Scotland cap against France in the Six Nations Championship on 8 March 2020. Scotland won the match 28–17. On his first start for Scotland in October 2021, Steyn scored four tries during a 60–14 victory over Tonga.

Steyn was selected in Scotland's 33 player squad for the 2023 Rugby World Cup in France.

== Coaching career ==
It was announced on 27 June 2025 that he would be taking over as the new Skills Coach for Glasgow Hawks for the season 2025-26.

== Career statistics ==
=== List of international tries ===
No.	Date	Venue	Opponent	Score	Result	Competition
1	30 October 2021	Murrayfield Stadium, Edinburgh, Scotland	Tonga	19–6	60–14	2021 end-of-year rugby union internationals
2	30 October 2021	Murrayfield Stadium, Edinburgh, Scotland	Tonga	31–9	60–14	2021 end-of-year rugby union internationals
3	30 October 2021	Murrayfield Stadium, Edinburgh, Scotland	Tonga	36–9	60–14	2021 end-of-year rugby union internationals
4	30 October 2021	Murrayfield Stadium, Edinburgh, Scotland	Tonga	58–14	60–14	2021 end-of-year rugby union internationals
5	11 February 2023	Murrayfield Stadium, Edinburgh, Scotland	Wales	19–7	35–7	2023 Six Nations Championship
6	11 February 2023	Murrayfield Stadium, Edinburgh, Scotland	Wales	26–7	35–7	2023 Six Nations Championship
7	12 August 2023	Stade Geoffroy Guichard, Saint-Étienne, France	France	5–0	27–30	2023 Rugby World Cup warm-up matches
8	12 August 2023	Stade Geoffroy Guichard, Saint-Étienne, France	France	27–27	27–30	2023 Rugby World Cup warm-up matches
9	26 August 2023	Murrayfield Stadium, Edinburgh, Scotland	Georgia	26–6	33–6	2023 Rugby World Cup warm-up matches
10	24 September 2023	Stade de Nice, Nice, France	Tonga	17–10	45–17	2023 Rugby World Cup
11	9 March 2024	Stadio Olimpico, Rome, Italy	Italy	12–3	29–31	2024 Six Nations Championship
12	20 July 2024	Estadio Nacional Julio Martínez Prádanos, Santiago, Chile	Chile	45-11	52-11	Skyscanners Americas Tour
13	8 November 2025	Murrayfield Stadium, Edinburgh, Scotland	New Zealand	12-14	17-25	2025 end-of-year rugby union internationals
14	21 February 2026	Millennium Stadium, Cardiff, Wales	Wales	5-7	26-23	2026 Six Nations Championship
15	7 March 2026	Murrayfield Stadium, Edinburgh, Scotland	France	12-14	50-40	2026 Six Nations Championship
16	7 March 2026	Murrayfield Stadium, Edinburgh, Scotland	France	17-14	50-40	2026 Six Nations Championship

as of 5 July 2025
