= Archie Griffin (rugby union) =

Wales international rugby union player

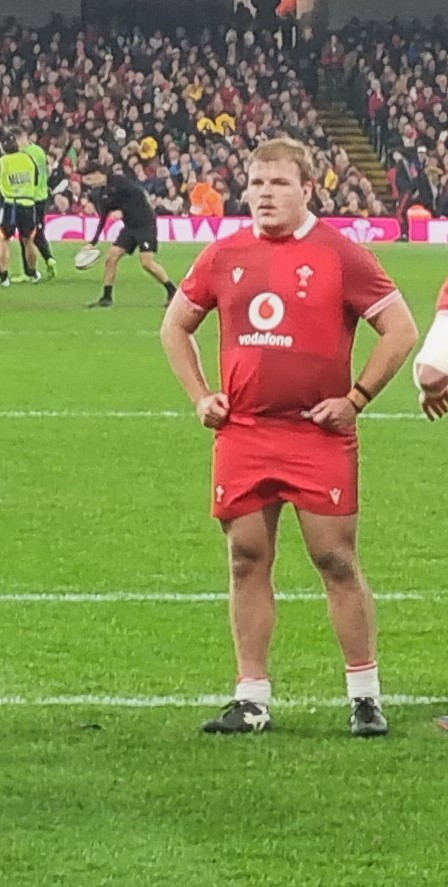
- Griffin playing for Wales in November 2025
- Born: 24 July 2001 (age 25) Sydney, New South Wales, Australia
- Height: 1.90 m (6 ft 3 in)
- Weight: 124 kg (273 lb; 19 st 7 lb)
- School: Marlborough College
- University: University of Bath

Rugby union career
- Position: Tighthead Prop
- Current team: Bath
Senior career
Years	Team	Apps	(Points)
2019–	Bath	31	(20)
2023	Richmond	2	(5)
- Correct as of 18 November 2026
International career
Years	Team	Apps	(Points)
2020	Wales U20	1	(0)
2024–	Wales	18	(10)
- Correct as of 18 November 2026

Archie Griffin (born 24 July 2001) is a Welsh professional rugby union player who plays as a tighthead prop for Premiership Rugby club Bath. Born in Australia to Welsh parents, he represents Wales at international level after qualifying on ancestry grounds.

== Early life ==
Griffin was born in Sydney, Australia but is Welsh-qualified through his parents. He joined the Bath Rugby academy at 13 years-old having also lived in Singapore until the previous year. He attended Cheam, in Berkshire and Marlborough College, in Wiltshire and signed his first professional contract with Bath in February 2019.

== Club career ==
Having progressed through the Bath Rugby academy and playing for the University of Bath, Griffin made his senior debut for Bath against Exeter Chiefs in the Premiership Rugby Cup on 26 November 2022. In January 2024, he signed a new three-year contract with Bath.

Griffin with the Bath squad in 2024

After playing for Bath in September 2024, he was taken ill and after medical consultation was diagnosed with pericarditis, an inflammation of the protective sac around the heart. After returning to action before the end of that year, he sustained a shoulder injury during Bath's 24-20 European Rugby Champions Cup defeat against La Rochelle on 10 December 2024, that and caused him to undergo surgery.

== International career ==
Having previously represented Wales U18, in January 2024, Griffin was included in the senior Wales squad for the 2024 Six Nations Championship. He made his debut in February 2024, as a replacement in Wales 16-14 Six Nations defeat to England at Twickenham.

Griffin was selected for the 2025 Wales rugby union tour of Japan. He came off the bench in the first test, and was selected to start in the second test. Griffin was named in the squad for the 2025 end-of-year rugby union internationals. He came off the bench against Argentina and New Zealand, but was given the start against Japan.

Griffin continued in the Wales squad for the 2026 Six Nations and the inaugural Nations Championship, and was a try-scorer on 14 November 2026 as Wales defeated New Zealand for the first time in 73 years, with a 35-28 win in Cardiff.

=== Wales international tries ===
Try	Opponent	Location	Venue	Competition	Date	Result
1	Japan	Cardiff, Wales	Millennium Stadium	2026 Nations Championship	7 November 2026	Win
2	New Zealand	Cardiff, Wales	Millennium Stadium	2026 Nations Championship	14 November 2026	Win

== Personal life ==
Although born in Sydney, both of his parents are Welsh, his mother being born in Wrexham and his father in Cardiff.
