= Rhys Carré =

Wales international rugby union player

- Born: Rhys Carré; 8 February 1998 (age 28) Cardiff, Wales
- Height: 191 cm (6 ft 3 in)
- Weight: 139 kg (306 lb; 21 st 12 lb)
- School: Corpus Christi Roman Catholic High School, Cardiff, Cowbridge Comprehensive School

Rugby union career
- Position: Loosehead Prop
- Current team: Saracens
Senior career
Years	Team	Apps	(Points)
2016–2019	Cardiff Blues	19	(0)
2019–2020	Saracens	8	(5)
2020–2024	Cardiff	75	(85)
2024–	Saracens	22	(10)
- Correct as of 21 October 2025
International career
Years	Team	Apps	(Points)
2017–2018	Wales U20	20	(10)
2019–	Wales	31	(30)
- Correct as of 16 September 2026

Rhys Carré (born 8 February 1998) is a Wales international rugby union player, who currently plays as a loosehead prop for Prem Rugby club Saracens in England.

== Club career ==
Carré made his debut for Cardiff Blues in 2016, having previously played for the organisation's academy team. He joined Saracens for the 2019–20 season, before returning to Cardiff the following season.

In March 2024, Carré re-signed for Saracens ahead of the 2024–25 season.

== International career ==
Carré made his debut for Wales on 31 August 2019, when he started in a 2019 Rugby World Cup warm-up match against Ireland. He was subsequently selected in Wales' 2019 World Cup squad.

Carré scored his first try for Wales in a 14–10 loss against Scotland during the 2020 Six Nations.

Carré was dropped for the 2022 end-of-year rugby union internationals, with Welsh coaching staff voicing concerns over his fitness.

He was selected in the initial 54-player training squad for the 2023 Rugby World Cup, before later being dropped from the squad for "failing to meet individual performance targets".

In October 2025, having been isolated from the squad since 2023 by previous coach Warren Gatland, he was selected for the 2025 Autumn Nations Series by Steve Tandy. This was despite only earning 20 caps, 5 below the required number of players playing outside Wales to be called up for the national team. However, having not been given a reasonable offer to remain in Wales by his previous club Cardiff, he was permitted to return to the national team by the Professional Rugby Board. Carré’s recall was notable, as he was within a year from being eligible to change international allegiance. His grandfather was born in Jersey, making him eligible for England, Ireland, and Scotland.

Carré was named in the squad for the 2026 Six Nations by Steve Tandy. He scored a solo try against Ireland, becoming only the sixth prop in history to score in three successive Test matches and winning the 2026 fan vote for Try of the Championship.

== International tries ==
Try	Opponent	Location	Venue	Competition	Date	Result
1	Scotland	Llanelli, Wales	Parc y Scarlets	2020 Six Nations	31 October 2020	
2	France	Cardiff, Wales	Principality Stadium	2026 Six Nations	15 February 2026	
3	Scotland	Cardiff, Wales	Principality Stadium	2026 Six Nations	21 February 2026	
4	Ireland	Dublin, Ireland	Aviva Stadium	2026 Six Nations	6 March 2026	
5	Fiji	Cardiff, Wales	Cardiff City Stadium	2026 Nations Championship	4 July 2026	
6	Argentina	San Juan, Argentina	Estadio San Juan del Bicentenario	2026 Nations Championship	11 July 2026	
