= Darcy Graham =

Scotland international rugby union player

- Born: 21 June 1997 (age 29) Hawick, Roxburghshire, Scotland
- Height: 1.77 m (5 ft 10 in)
- Weight: 84 kg (185 lb; 13 st 3 lb)
- School: Hawick High School

Rugby union career
- Position(s): Wing, fullback
- Current team: Edinburgh
Senior career
Years	Team	Apps	(Points)
2017–	Edinburgh	101	(240)
- Correct as of 18 November 2026
International career
Years	Team	Apps	(Points)
2016–2017	Scotland U20	16	(40)
2017–2018	Scotland 7s	49	(155)
2018–	Scotland	58	(190)
2025	British & Irish Lions	0	(0)
- Correct as of 15 November 2026

Darcy Graham (born 21 June 1997) is a Scottish professional rugby union player who plays as a wing or fullback for United Rugby Championship club Edinburgh and the Scotland national team.

== Club career ==
Graham played for Hawick Rugby Club, playing in the Scottish Cup final aged only 17.

Having been a Scottish Rugby Academy stage 2 player, in 2017 Graham was signed by Edinburgh on a two year professional contract.

He made his debut in the European Challenge Cup against London Irish, scoring a try in a 50-20 win.

== International career ==
He has represented Scotland under 18s, Scotland under 20s and Scotland 7s. In August 2017 Gregor Townsend called Graham up to the extended Scotland national team training squad.

In October 2018 Graham was called up again to the training squad and was then promoted to the main squad. He earned his first cap off the bench against Wales in November 2018. His first international try came in the 2019 Six Nations match against Wales at Murrayfield, and he subsequently scored two tries against England in the Calcutta Cup.

Graham was part of Scotland's squad for the 2019 Rugby World Cup in Japan. In 2023 Graham was selected in the 33-player squad for the 2023 Rugby World Cup in France.

Graham scored four tries in the 2024 Autumn Nations Series fixture against Fiji as they went on to win 57–17, a game in which he also won player of the match. During the game, he had briefly become Scotland's joint all time leading try-scorer before Duhan van der Merwe pulled ahead again before the final whistle. Graham scored on his next appearance for Scotland against Portugal, to draw level with Duhan van der Merwe once more as Scotland's leading try scorer.

In March 2026, Graham once again overtook Van der Merwe to become the all-time leading try scorer for Scotland, scoring two tries during a 50–40 victory against France in the penultimate round of the 2026 Six Nations.

== British & Irish Lions ==
He was not selected in the initial squad for the 2025 British & Irish Lions tour to Australia, but was subsequently called up ahead of the test series getting underway. He made an appearance in the final midweek match against the First Nations & Pasifika XV, becoming Lion #884 and scoring a try after only ten minutes. However, he was injured shortly afterwards.

== Career statistics ==
=== List of international tries ===
No.	Date	Venue	Opponent	Score	Result	Competition
1	9 March 2019	Murrayfield Stadium, Edinburgh, Scotland	Wales	11–15	11–18	2019 Six Nations Championship
2	16 March 2019	Twickenham Stadium, London, England	England	12–31	38–38	2019 Six Nations Championship
3	16 March 2019	Twickenham Stadium, London, England	England	24–31	38–38	2019 Six Nations Championship
4	31 August 2019	Dinamo Arena, Tbilisi, Georgia	Georgia	35–10	44–10	2019 Rugby World Cup warm-up matches
5	6 September 2019	Murrayfield Stadium, Edinburgh, Scotland	Georgia	22–9	36–9	2019 Rugby World Cup warm-up matches
6	23 October 2020	Murrayfield Stadium, Edinburgh, Scotland	Georgia	5–0	48–7	2020 end-of-year rugby union internationals
7	23 October 2020	Murrayfield Stadium, Edinburgh, Scotland	Georgia	41–7	48–7	2020 end-of-year rugby union internationals
8	13 February 2021	Murrayfield Stadium, Edinburgh, Scotland	Wales	8–3	24–25	2021 Six Nations Championship
9	20 March 2021	Murrayfield Stadium, Edinburgh, Scotland	Italy	17–10	52–10	2021 Six Nations Championship
10	20 November 2021	Murrayfield Stadium, Edinburgh, Scotland	Japan	17–9	29–20	2021 end-of-year rugby union internationals
11	12 February 2022	Millennium Stadium, Cardiff, Wales	Wales	5–6	17–20	2022 Six Nations Championship
12	12 March 2022	Stadio Olimpico, Rome, Italy	Italy	24–10	33–22	2022 Six Nations Championship
13	13 November 2022	Murrayfield Stadium, Edinburgh, Scotland	New Zealand	12–14	23–31	2022 end-of-year rugby union internationals
14	19 November 2022	Murrayfield Stadium, Edinburgh, Scotland	Argentina	19–8	52–29	2022 end-of-year rugby union internationals
15	19 November 2022	Murrayfield Stadium, Edinburgh, Scotland	Argentina	24–15	52–29	2022 end-of-year rugby union internationals
16	19 November 2022	Murrayfield Stadium, Edinburgh, Scotland	Argentina	50–22	52–29	2022 end-of-year rugby union internationals
17	29 July 2023	Murrayfield Stadium, Edinburgh, Scotland	Italy	5–0	25–13	2023 Rugby World Cup warm-up matches
18	29 July 2023	Murrayfield Stadium, Edinburgh, Scotland	Italy	13–6	25–13	2023 Rugby World Cup warm-up matches
19	5 August 2023	Murrayfield Stadium, Edinburgh, Scotland	France	8–21	25–21	2023 Rugby World Cup warm-up matches
20	24 September 2023	Stade de Nice, Nice, France	Tonga	43–17	45–17	2023 Rugby World Cup
21	30 September 2023	Stade Pierre-Mauroy, Lille, France	Romania	19–0	84–0	2023 Rugby World Cup
22	30 September 2023	Stade Pierre-Mauroy, Lille, France	Romania	26–0	84–0	2023 Rugby World Cup
23	30 September 2023	Stade Pierre-Mauroy, Lille, France	Romania	40–0	84–0	2023 Rugby World Cup
24	30 September 2023	Stade Pierre-Mauroy, Lille, France	Romania	82–0	84–0	2023 Rugby World Cup
25	2 November 2024	Murrayfield Stadium, Edinburgh, Scotland	Fiji	12–0	57-17	2024 end-of-year rugby union internationals
26	2 November 2024	Murrayfield Stadium, Edinburgh, Scotland	Fiji	19–0	57-17	2024 end-of-year rugby union internationals
27	2 November 2024	Murrayfield Stadium, Edinburgh, Scotland	Fiji	34–17	57-17	2024 end-of-year rugby union internationals
28	2 November 2024	Murrayfield Stadium, Edinburgh, Scotland	Fiji	41–17	57-17	2024 end-of-year rugby union internationals
29	16 November 2024	Murrayfield Stadium, Edinburgh, Scotland	Portugal	24-0	59-21	2024 end-of-year rugby union internationals
30	8 March 2025	Murrayfield Stadium, Edinburgh, Scotland	Wales	19–8	35–29	2025 Six Nations Championship
31	15 March 2025	Stade de France, Paris, France	France	13–8	35–16	2025 Six Nations Championship
32	1 November 2025	Murrayfield Stadium, Edinburgh, Scotland	United States	21–0	86-0	2025 end-of-year rugby union internationals
33	1 November 2025	Murrayfield Stadium, Edinburgh, Scotland	United States	45–0	86-0	2025 end-of-year rugby union internationals
34	1 November 2025	Murrayfield Stadium, Edinburgh, Scotland	United States	50-0	86-0	2025 end-of-year rugby union internationals
35	21 February 2026	Millennium Stadium, Cardiff, Wales	Wales	19-23	26-23	2026 Six Nations Championship
36	7 March 2026	Murrayfield Stadium, Edinburgh, Scotland	France	7–0	50-40	2026 Six Nations Championship
37	7 March 2026	Murrayfield Stadium, Edinburgh, Scotland	France	40-14	50-40	2026 Six Nations Championship
38	21 February 2026	Aviva Stadium, Dublin, Ireland	Ireland	7-7	43-21	2026 Six Nations Championship

as of 21 March 2026

Awards and achievements
Previous: Matt Fagerson	Sir Willie Purves Quaich; 2019	Next: Jamie Ritchie
