= Tommaso Menoncello =

Italy international rugby union player

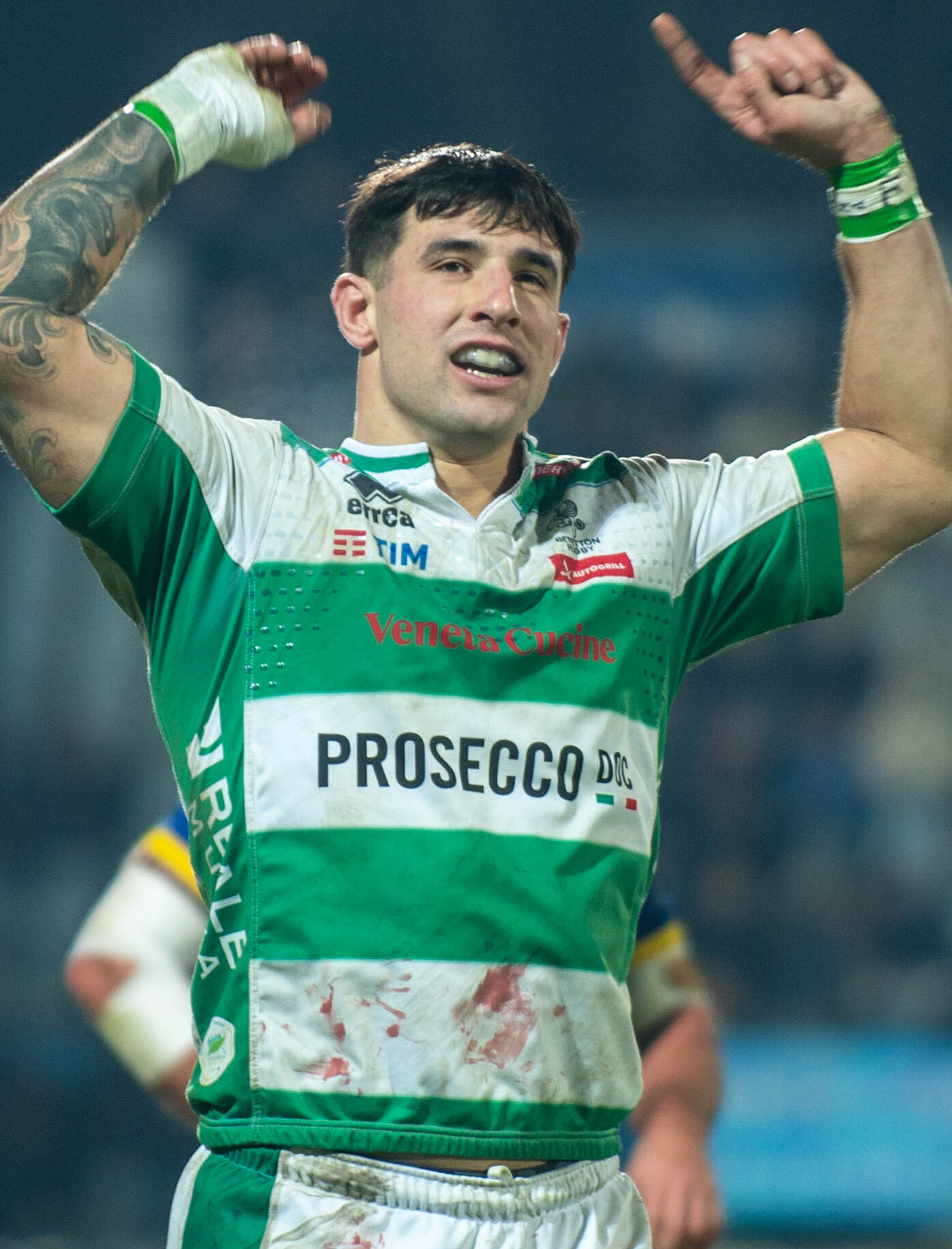
- Menoncello with Benetton in 2025
- Born: 20 August 2002 (age 24) Treviso, Veneto, Italy
- Height: 186 cm (6 ft 1 in)
- Weight: 105 kg (231 lb; 16 st 7 lb)

Rugby union career
- Position(s): Centre, Wing
- Current team: Stade Toulousain
Senior career
Years	Team	Apps	(Points)
2020–2021	FIR Academy		
2021–2026	Benetton	75	(115)
2026–	Stade Toulousain	1	(5)
- Correct as of 22 Sep 2026
International career
Years	Team	Apps	(Points)
2021	Italy U20	5	(0)
2021	Italy A	2	(0)
2022–	Italy	41	(60)
- Correct as of 11 July 2026

Tommaso Menoncello (Italian pronunciation: [menonˈtʃɛllo]; born 20 August 2002) is an Italian professional rugby union player who plays as a centre for Stade Toulousain in Top 14 and the Italy national team.

== Club career ==
Menoncello has previously played for clubs such as Paese at youth level. For 2020–21 Pro14 and initially for 2021–22 United Rugby Championship seasons, he was named as Permit Player for Benetton Rugby.

He represented Benetton for 6 season in URC and became one of their star players, until he signed with French side Stade Toulousain ahead of the 2026–27 season.

== International career ==
Selected with F.I.R. Academy, in June 2021 Menoncello was named in Italy Under 20 squad for 2021 Six Nations Under 20s Championship. He was selected by Alessandro Troncon to be part of an Italy A 28-man squad for the November 2021 end-of-year rugby union internationals.

Menoncello was selected by Kieran Crowley to be part of an Italy 33-man squad for the 2022 Six Nations Championship. He made his debut against France, where he scored a try and became the youngest try-scorer in the history of the tournament, at the age of 19 years and 170 days.

Menoncello was named the 2024 Six Nations Player of the Championship.

== Statistics ==
=== List of international test tries ===
As of 11 July 2026.

List of international tries scored by Tommaso Menoncello
No.	Opponent	Venue	Date	Competition	Result
1	France	Stade de France, Saint-Denis	5 February 2022	2022 Six Nations Championship	37–10
2	Romania	Arcul de Triumf Stadium, Bucharest	1 July 2022	2022 July Internationals	13–45
3	Romania	Arcul de Triumf Stadium, Bucharest	1 July 2022	2022 July Internationals	13–45
4	Georgia	Adjarabet Arena, Batumi	10 July 2022	2022 July Internationals	28–19
5	Ireland	Aviva Stadium, Dublin	5 August 2023	2023 Rugby World Cup warm-up match	33–17
6	New Zealand	Juventus Stadium, Turin	23 November 2024	2024 Autumn Internationals	11–29
7	France	Stadio Olimpico, Rome	23 February 2025	2025 Six Nations Championship	24–73
8	England	Twickenham Stadium, London	9 March 2025	2025 Six Nations Championship	47–24
9	Namibia	Hage Geingob Rugby Stadium, Windhoek	27 June 2025	2025 Italy tour of Namibia and South Africa	6–73
10	Scotland	Stadio Olimpico, Rome	7 February 2026	2026 Six Nations Championship	18–15
11	England	Stadio Olimpico, Rome	7 March 2026	2026 Six Nations Championship	23–18
12	New Zealand	Wellington Regional Stadium, Wellington	11 July 2026	2026 Nations Championship	47–17

== Honours ==
Italy

- Cuttitta Cup:
  - Winner: 2024, 2026

Individual

- Six Nations Player of the Championship:
  - Winner: 2024
  - Nominee: 2025, 2026
- Six Nations Team of the Championship:
  - Winner: 2024, 2025, 2026
