= Thomas Ramos =

French rugby union player (born 1995)

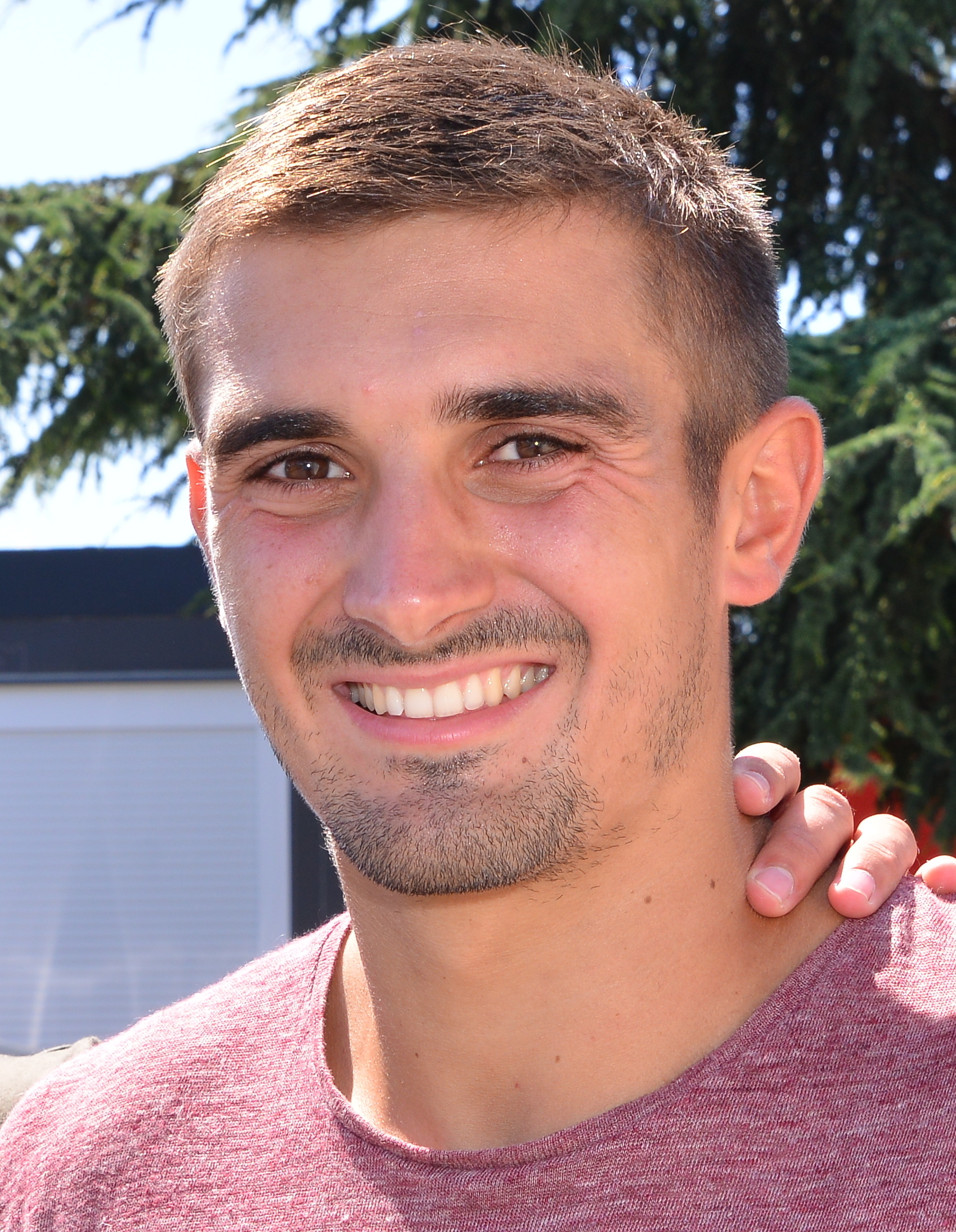
- Ramos in 2018
- Born: 23 July 1995 (age 31) Mazamet, France
- Height: 1.78 m (5 ft 10 in)
- Weight: 87 kg (192 lb; 13 st 10 lb)

Rugby union career
- Position(s): Fullback, Fly-half
- Current team: Toulouse
Senior career
Years	Team	Apps	(Points)
2014–	Toulouse	176	(2,096)
2016–2017	→ Colomiers (loan)	24	(345)
- Correct as of 30 June 2025
International career
Years	Team	Apps	(Points)
2015	France U20	7	(64)
2017	French Barbarians	1	(3)
2019–	France	52	(563)
- Correct as of 14 March 2026

Thomas Ramos (born 23 July 1995) is a French professional rugby union player who plays as a fullback for Top 14 club Toulouse and the France national team.

== Club career ==
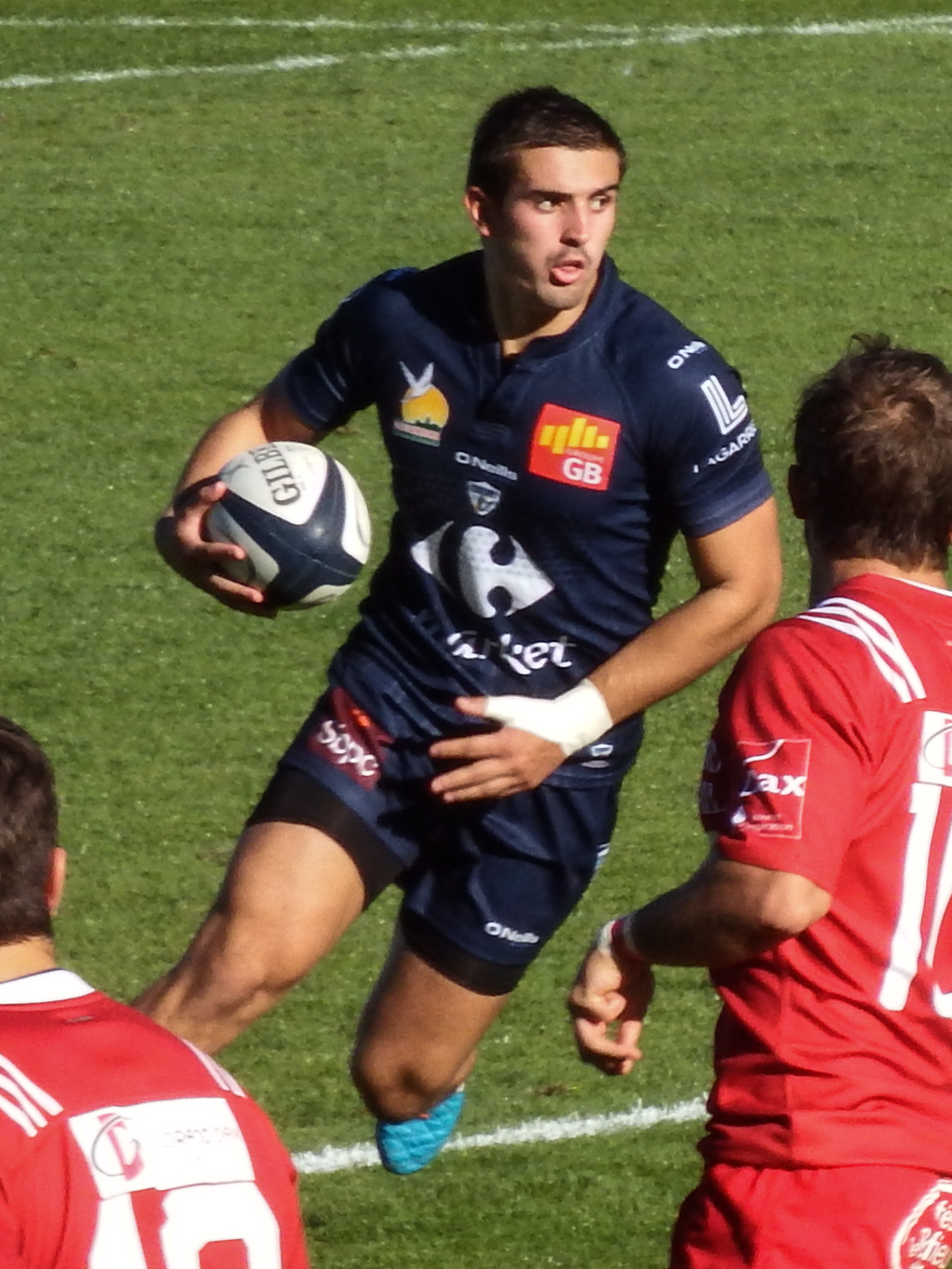
Ramos playing for Colomiers in 2016.

In February 2014, aged 18, Ramos scored a try in his debut for Toulouse in the Top 14 against Castres. He spent the 2016-17 season on loan at Colomiers.

In April 2025, after having missed half of his previous shots in the game, he kicked a penalty in the last play of the 2024–25 Champions Cup quarter finals to win 21–18 against Toulon at the Stade Mayol. He was later nominated for Champions Cup Player of the Year 2025. In June 2025, he kicked the winning penalties in extra time to win the Top 14 title again with Toulouse as they defeated Bordeaux Bègles 39–33 in the final.

He is the top-point scorer of all time at his club Toulouse.

In August 2026, it was announced that Ramos would join Racing 92 at the end of the 2026-27 season. Ramos said he has "chosen to take on a new sporting challenge, with the desire to discover a new environment and continue my development".

== International career ==
In November 2017, Ramos was selected for the French Barbarian team which played and beat the Māori All Blacks 19–15.

Ramos received his first call-up to the French squad for the 2019 Six Nations. He made his debut off the bench against England on 10 February. He was a part of the French squad that won the Grand Slam during the 2022 Six Nations. Although France finished second and failed to retain their title in the 2023 Six Nations, Ramos finished the tournament as top scorer. He was selected to be in the 34-man squad for France as they hosted the 2023 Rugby World Cup. They would advance past the Pool stage, however they exited the tournament in the quarterfinals after losing to eventual winners South Africa. He was featured in the French squad for the 2024 Six Nations, and for the second year in a row, France finished second only behind Ireland. He was part of the French squad for the 2025 Six Nations Championship won by France. In the final match against Scotland, Ramos overtook Frédéric Michalak as the highest points scorer for the French national team.

He scored his 500th point for Les Blues against Ireland in the opening fixture of the 2026 Six Nations on 5 February. France would go on to win a second consecutive Six Nations Championship after a narrow 48-46 win against England in Paris.

Ramos was top scorer in the Six Nations tournament for four consecutive years: 2023 (84 points), 2024 (63 points), 2025 (71 points), and 2026 (74 points).

== Personal life ==
Ramos is of Portuguese descent through his paternal grandfather.

== Career statistics ==
=== List of international tries ===
International tries
No.	Date	Venue	Opponent	Score	Result	Competition
1	30 August 2019	Stade de France, Saint-Denis, France	Italy	45–19	47–19	2019 Rugby World Cup warm-up matches
2	5 February 2023	Stadio Olimpico, Rome, Italy	Italy	3–12	24–29	2023 Six Nations
3	26 February 2023	Stade de France, Saint-Denis, France	Scotland	17–0	32–21	2023 Six Nations
4	11 March 2023	Twickenham, London, England	England	0–5	10–53	2023 Six Nations
5	6 October 2023	Parc Olympique Lyonnais, Décines-Charpieu, France	Italy	22–0	60–7	2023 Rugby World Cup
6	15 March 2025	Stade de France, Saint-Denis, France	Scotland	28–16	35–16	2025 Six Nations
7	22 November 2025	Stade de France, Saint-Denis, France	Australia	12–12	48–33	2025 Autumn internationals
8	22 February 2026	Stade Pierre-Mauroy, Villeneuve-d'Ascq, France	Italy	17–0	33–8	2026 Six Nations
9	7 March 2026	Murrayfield Stadium, Edinburgh, Scotland	Scotland	47–26	50–40	2026 Six Nations
10	7 March 2026	Murrayfield Stadium, Edinburgh, Scotland	Scotland	50–38	50–40	2026 Six Nations

== Honours ==
Toulouse

- 2× European Rugby Champions Cup: 2021, 2024
- 5× Top 14: 2019, 2021, 2023, 2024, 2025

France

- 3x Six Nations Championship: 2022, 2025, 2026
- 1× Grand Slam: 2022
