= Gaël Dréan =

French rugby union player (born 2000)

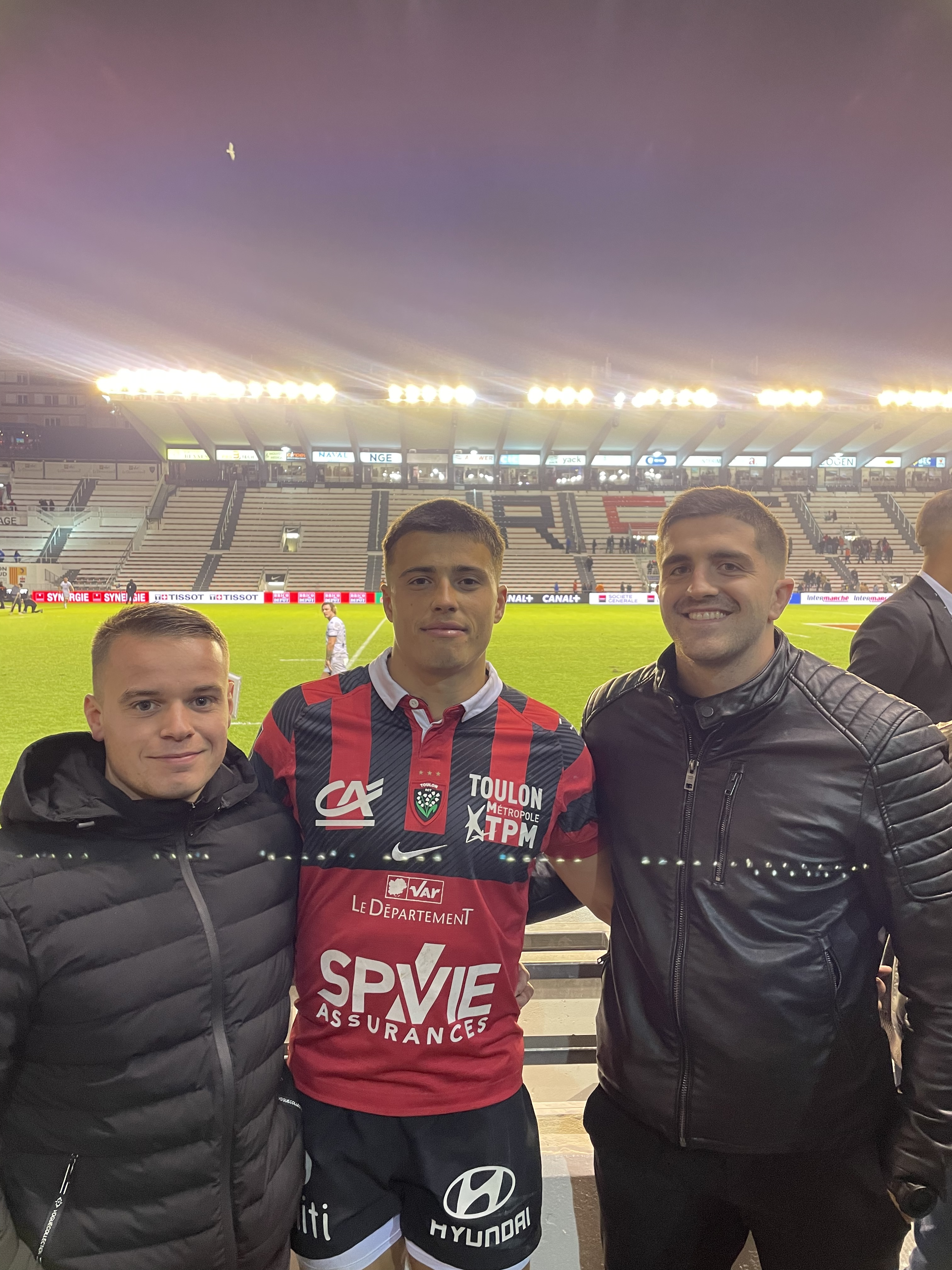
- Dréan in 2022
- Born: Gaël Dréan; 22 October 2000 (age 26) Lorient, France
- Height: 1.84 m (6 ft 1/2 in)
- Weight: 84 kg (13.2 st; 185 lb)

Rugby union career
- Position: Winger
Senior career
Years	Team	Apps	(Points)
2020–2022	Rennes	23	(70)
2022–	Toulon	42	(115)
- Correct as of 7 February 2025
International career
Years	Team	Apps	(Points)
2026–	France	1	(5)
- Correct as of 22 February 2026

Gaël Dréan (born 22 October 2000) is a French professional rugby union footballer who plays as a winger for Toulon and France.

== Club career ==
From Lorient in Brittany, he played for his local club Rugby Ovalie Lorient until 2019. He played for Plouzané in Fédérale 3 and then Rennes EC. He joined Top 14 club RC Toulon in 2022. He scored two tries in his first two starts for the club during the 2022-23 season.

== International career ==
In January 2025, he was called up to the France national rugby union team ahead of the 2025 Six Nations Championship.

=== List of international tries ===
International tries
No.	Date	Venue	Opponent	Score	Result	Competition
1	22 February 2026	Stade Pierre-Mauroy, Villeneuve-d'Ascq, France	Italy	24–8	33–8	2026 Six Nations

== Personal life ==
His father, Michel Dréan, played football in the French third division.

== Honours ==
France

- 1x Six Nations Championship: 2026
