= Trevor Davison =

England international rugby union player

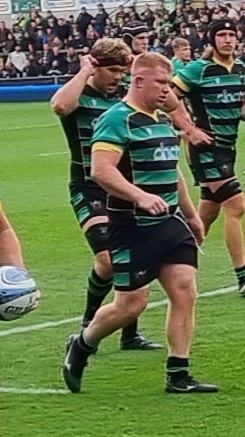
- Davison in 2023
- Born: Trevor Davison; 20 August 1992 (age 34) Newcastle upon Tyne, England
- Height: 1.88 m (6 ft 2 in)
- Weight: 122 kg (19 st 3 lb)
- School: St Cuthbert's High School

Rugby union career
- Position: Prop
- Current team: Northampton Saints
Senior career
Years	Team	Apps	(Points)
2012–2017	Blaydon RFC	100	(15)
2017–2023	Newcastle Falcons	105	(10)
2023–	Northampton Saints	61	(15)
- Correct as of 3 January 2026
International career
Years	Team	Apps	(Points)
2015–2017	England Counties XV	7	(0)
2021–	England	4	(0)
- Correct as of 7 February 2026

Trevor Davison (born 20 August 1992) is an English professional rugby union player who plays as a prop for Premiership Rugby club Northampton Saints.

== Club career ==
Davison joined Newcastle Falcons in the summer of 2017 from boyhood club Blaydon RFC, for whom he made over 100 appearances where he developed under Micky Ward. Making 23 first team appearances in his debut season, 13 of which came in the Premiership, Davison was part of the Falcons side which defeated Northampton Saints in front of a club record crowd of 30,174 at St James' Park.

In 2018-19, Davison started in the Champions Cup home games against Edinburgh Rugby and Toulon. Helping the Falcons to promotion from the RFU Championship in 2019–20, Davison scored two tries in 17 appearances during the 2020-21 campaign.

On 14 March 2023, Davison left Newcastle to join Premiership rivals Northampton Saints with immediate effect prior to the completion of the 2022–23 season. At the end of that campaign he started in the play–off elimination against Saracens.

In his first full season at the club Davison started in the 2023–24 Premiership Rugby final which saw Northampton defeat Bath to become league champions. The following season Davison played in the 2025 European Rugby Champions Cup final at the Millennium Stadium as Northampton lost to Bordeaux Bègles to finish runners up.

== International career ==
Having represented England Counties on multiple overseas tours, Davison was included in the senior England squad by coach Eddie Jones in June 2021. On 4 July 2021 Davison made his Test debut off the bench in a victory over the United States at Twickenham. Later that year during the autumn internationals he won his second cap when he played against Australia.

Davison was included in the England squad for their 2025 summer tour. He made an international appearance for the first time in four years when he played in their last fixture of the tour against the United States.

== Honours ==
Northampton Saints

- Premiership Rugby: 2023–24, 2025–26
- European Rugby Champions Cup runner-up: 2024–25

Newcastle Falcons

- Champ Rugby: 2019–20
