= 2020 Six Nations Championship squads =

Rugby union competition squads

This is a list of the complete squads for the 2020 Six Nations Championship, an annual rugby union tournament contested by the national rugby teams of England, France, Ireland, Italy, Scotland and Wales. Wales are the defending champions.

Note: Number of caps and players' ages are indicated as of 1 February 2020 – the tournament's opening day. For players added to a squad during the tournament, their caps and age are indicated as of the date of their call-up.

== England ==
On 20 January, Eddie Jones named a 36-man squad for the 2020 Six Nations Championship. In February 2020 it was announced that Beno Obano and Henry Slade had joined the squad with Mako Vunipola withdrawing for family reasons.

Head coach: (Australia) Eddie Jones

Player	Position	Date of birth (age)	Caps	Club/province
Luke Cowan-Dickie	Hooker	20 June 1993 (aged 26)	21	(England) Exeter Chiefs
Tom Dunn	Hooker	12 November 1992 (aged 27)	0	(England) Bath
Jamie George	Hooker	20 October 1990 (aged 29)	45	(England) Saracens
Beno Obano	Prop	25 October 1994 (aged 25)	0	(England) Bath
Ellis Genge	Prop	16 February 1995 (aged 24)	14	(England) Leicester Tigers
Joe Marler	Prop	7 July 1990 (aged 29)	68	(England) Harlequins
Kyle Sinckler	Prop	30 March 1993 (aged 26)	31	(England) Harlequins
Will Stuart	Prop	12 July 1996 (aged 23)	0	(England) Bath
Mako Vunipola	Prop	14 January 1991 (aged 29)	58	(England) Saracens
Harry Williams	Prop	1 October 1991 (aged 28)	18	(England) Exeter Chiefs
Charlie Ewels	Lock	29 June 1995 (aged 24)	12	(England) Bath
George Kruis	Lock	22 February 1990 (aged 29)	41	(England) Saracens
Joe Launchbury	Lock	12 April 1991 (aged 28)	62	(England) Wasps
Courtney Lawes	Lock	23 February 1989 (aged 30)	81	(England) Northampton Saints
Maro Itoje	Lock	28 October 1994 (aged 25)	34	(England) Saracens
Alexander Moon	Lock	6 September 1996 (aged 23)	0	(England) Northampton Saints
Ted Hill	Back row	26 March 1999 (aged 20)	1	(England) Worcester Warriors
Tom Curry	Back row	15 June 1998 (aged 21)	19	(England) Sale Sharks
Ben Earl	Back row	7 January 1998 (aged 22)	0	(England) Saracens
Lewis Ludlam	Back row	8 December 1995 (aged 24)	6	(England) Northampton Saints
Sam Underhill	Back row	22 July 1996 (aged 23)	15	(England) Bath
Willi Heinz	Scrum-half	24 November 1986 (aged 33)	9	(England) Gloucester
Ben Youngs	Scrum-half	5 September 1989 (aged 30)	95	(England) Leicester Tigers
Owen Farrell	Fly-half	24 September 1991 (aged 28)	79	(England) Saracens
George Ford	Fly-half	16 March 1993 (aged 26)	65	(England) Leicester Tigers
Jacob Umaga	Fly-half	8 July 1998 (aged 21)	0	(England) Wasps
Ollie Devoto	Centre	22 September 1993 (aged 26)	1	(England) Exeter Chiefs
Fraser Dingwall	Centre	7 April 1999 (aged 20)	0	(England) Northampton Saints
Jonathan Joseph	Centre	21 May 1991 (aged 28)	47	(England) Bath
Manu Tuilagi	Centre	18 May 1991 (aged 28)	40	(England) Sale Sharks
Ollie Thorley	Wing	11 September 1996 (aged 23)	0	(England) Gloucester
Jonny May	Wing	1 April 1990 (aged 29)	52	(England) Leicester Tigers
Anthony Watson	Wing	26 February 1994 (aged 25)	42	(England) Bath
Elliot Daly	Fullback	8 October 1992 (aged 27)	39	(England) Saracens
George Furbank	Fullback	17 October 1996 (aged 23)	0	(England) Northampton Saints

== France ==
On 8 January, Galthié named a 42-man squad for the 2020 Six Nations Championship.

Head coach: (France) Fabien Galthié

Player	Position	Date of birth (age)	Caps	Club/province
Camille Chat	Hooker	18 December 1995 (aged 24)	26	(France) Racing 92
Anthony Étrillard	Hooker	21 March 1993 (aged 26)	0	(France) Toulon
Julien Marchand	Hooker	10 May 1995 (aged 24)	2	(France) Toulouse
Dorian Aldegheri	Prop	4 August 1993 (aged 26)	4	(France) Toulouse
Cyril Baille	Prop	15 September 1993 (aged 26)	17	(France) Toulouse
Demba Bamba	Prop	17 March 1998 (aged 21)	7	(France) Lyon
Jean-Baptiste Gros	Prop	29 May 1999 (aged 20)	0	(France) Toulon
Mohamed Haouas	Prop	9 June 1994 (aged 25)	0	(France) Montpellier
Jefferson Poirot	Prop	1 November 1992 (aged 27)	33	(France) Bordeaux Bègles
Cyril Cazeaux	Lock	10 February 1995 (aged 24)	0	(France) Bordeaux Bègles
Kilian Geraci	Lock	25 March 1999 (aged 20)	0	(France) Lyon
Bernard Le Roux	Lock	4 June 1989 (aged 30)	37	(France) Racing 92
Boris Palu	Lock	4 February 1996 (aged 23)	0	(France) Racing 92
Romain Taofifénua	Lock	14 September 1990 (aged 29)	14	(France) Toulon
Paul Willemse	Lock	13 November 1992 (aged 27)	5	(France) Montpellier
Gregory Alldritt	Back row	23 March 1997 (aged 22)	11	(France) La Rochelle
Dylan Cretin	Back row	4 May 1997 (aged 22)	0	(France) Lyon
François Cros	Back row	25 March 1994 (aged 25)	2	(France) Toulouse
Alexandre Fischer	Back row	19 January 1998 (aged 22)	0	(France) Clermont Auvergne
Sekou Macalou	Back row	20 April 1995 (aged 24)	2	(France) Stade Français
Charles Ollivon (c)	Back row	11 May 1993 (aged 26)	11	(France) Toulon
Selevasio Tolofua	Back row	31 May 1997 (aged 22)	0	(France) Toulouse
Cameron Woki	Back row	7 November 1998 (aged 21)	0	(France) Bordeaux Bègles
Antoine Dupont	Scrum-half	15 November 1996 (aged 23)	20	(France) Toulouse
Maxime Lucu	Scrum-half	12 January 1993 (aged 27)	0	(France) Bordeaux Bègles
Baptiste Serin	Scrum-half	20 June 1994 (aged 25)	33	(France) Toulon
Louis Carbonel	Fly-half	4 February 1999 (aged 20)	0	(France) Toulon
Matthieu Jalibert	Fly-half	6 November 1998 (aged 21)	1	(France) Bordeaux Bègles
Romain Ntamack	Fly-half	1 May 1999 (aged 20)	12	(France) Toulouse
Gaël Fickou	Centre	26 March 1994 (aged 25)	51	(France) Stade Français
Julien Hériteau	Centre	12 January 1994 (aged 26)	0	(France) Toulon
Virimi Vakatawa	Centre	1 May 1992 (aged 27)	21	(France) Racing 92
Arthur Vincent	Centre	30 September 1999 (aged 20)	0	(France) Montpellier
Gervais Cordin	Wing	10 December 1998 (aged 21)	0	(France) Toulon
Lester Etien	Wing	21 June 1995 (aged 24)	0	(France) Stade Français Paris
Gabriel N'Gandebe	Wing	30 March 1997 (aged 22)	0	(France) Montpellier
Damian Penaud	Wing	25 September 1996 (aged 23)	16	(France) Clermont Auvergne
Vincent Rattez	Wing	24 March 1992 (aged 27)	3	(France) La Rochelle
Teddy Thomas	Wing	18 September 1993 (aged 26)	16	(France) Racing 92
Anthony Bouthier	Fullback	19 June 1992 (aged 27)	0	(France) Montpellier
Kylan Hamdaoui	Fullback	15 April 1994 (aged 25)	0	(France) Stade Français
Thomas Ramos	Fullback	23 July 1995 (aged 24)	9	(France) Toulouse

Call-ups
On 13 January, Peato Mauvaka was called up to replace the injured Anthony Étrillard.

On 19 January, Wilfrid Hounkpatin was called up to replace the injured Dorian Aldegheri.

On 26 January, Alexandre Roumat and Yvan Reilhac were called up to replace the injured Dylan Cretin and Kylan Hamdaoui.

On 27 January, Teddy Baubigny was called up to replace the injured Camille Chat.

On 30 January, Uini Atonio was called up to replace the injured Wilfrid Hounkpatin.

On 3 February, Baptiste Couilloud was called up to replace Maxime Lucu.

On 4 February, Arthur Retiere and Baptiste Delaporte were called up to replace the injured Alexandre Fischer and Lester Etien.

On 17 February: Guillaume Ducat, Maxime Lucu, Baptiste Delaporte, Alivereti Raka & Lucas Tauzin were called up to replace the injured Cyril Cazeaux, Baptiste Couilloud, Sekou Makalou, Julien Hériteau & Lester Etien.

Player	Position	Date of birth (age)	Caps	Club/province
Teddy Baubigny	Hooker	2 September 1998 (aged 21)	0	(France) Racing 92
Peato Mauvaka	Hooker	10 January 1997 (aged 23)	1	(France) Toulouse
Wilfrid Hounkpatin	Prop	29 July 1991 (aged 28)	0	(France) Castres
Uini Atonio	Prop	26 March 1990 (aged 29)	32	(France) La Rochelle
Guillaume Ducat	Lock	25 May 1996 (aged 23)	0	(France) Bayonne
Baptiste Delaporte	Back row	27 March 1997 (aged 22)	0	(France) Castres
Alexandre Roumat	Back row	27 June 1997 (aged 22)	0	(France) Bordeaux Bègles
Yvan Reilhac	Centre	9 June 1995 (aged 24)	0	(France) Montpellier
Alivereti Raka	Wing	9 December 1994 (aged 25)	4	(France) Clermont Auvergne
Lucas Tauzin	Wing	21 May 1998 (aged 21)	0	(France) Toulouse

== Ireland ==
On 15 January 2020, Andy Farrell named his 35-man Ireland squad for the 2020 Six Nations Championship.

Head coach: (England) Andy Farrell

Player	Position	Date of birth (age)	Caps	Club/province
Dave Heffernan	Hooker	31 January 1991 (aged 29)	1	(Ireland) Connacht
Rob Herring	Hooker	27 April 1990 (aged 29)	8	(Ireland) Ulster
Rónan Kelleher	Hooker	21 January 1998 (aged 22)	0	(Ireland) Leinster
Tadhg Furlong	Prop	14 November 1992 (aged 27)	41	(Ireland) Leinster
Cian Healy	Prop	7 October 1987 (aged 32)	95	(Ireland) Leinster
Dave Kilcoyne	Prop	14 December 1988 (aged 31)	36	(Ireland) Munster
Jack McGrath	Prop	11 October 1989 (aged 30)	56	(Ireland) Ulster
Tom O'Toole	Prop	23 September 1998 (aged 21)	0	(Ireland) Ulster
Andrew Porter	Prop	16 January 1996 (aged 24)	23	(Ireland) Leinster
Ultan Dillane	Lock	9 November 1993 (aged 26)	14	(Ireland) Connacht
Iain Henderson	Lock	21 February 1992 (aged 27)	53	(Ireland) Ulster
James Ryan	Lock	24 July 1996 (aged 23)	23	(Ireland) Leinster
Devin Toner	Lock	29 June 1986 (aged 33)	67	(Ireland) Leinster
Will Connors	Back row	4 April 1996 (aged 23)	0	(Ireland) Leinster
Max Deegan	Back row	1 October 1996 (aged 23)	0	(Ireland) Leinster
Caelan Doris	Back row	2 April 1998 (aged 21)	0	(Ireland) Leinster
Jack O'Donoghue	Back row	8 February 1994 (aged 25)	2	(Ireland) Munster
Peter O'Mahony	Back row	17 September 1989 (aged 30)	64	(Ireland) Munster
CJ Stander	Back row	5 April 1990 (aged 29)	38	(Ireland) Munster
Josh van der Flier	Back row	25 April 1993 (aged 26)	23	(Ireland) Leinster
John Cooney	Scrum-half	1 May 1990 (aged 29)	8	(Ireland) Ulster
Luke McGrath	Scrum-half	3 February 1993 (aged 26)	19	(Ireland) Leinster
Conor Murray	Scrum-half	20 April 1989 (aged 30)	78	(Ireland) Munster
Billy Burns	Fly-half	13 June 1994 (aged 25)	0	(Ireland) Ulster
Ross Byrne	Fly-half	8 April 1995 (aged 24)	3	(Ireland) Leinster
Johnny Sexton (c)	Fly-half	11 July 1985 (aged 34)	88	(Ireland) Leinster
Bundee Aki	Centre	7 April 1990 (aged 29)	23	(Ireland) Connacht
Chris Farrell	Centre	16 March 1993 (aged 26)	9	(Ireland) Munster
Robbie Henshaw	Centre	12 June 1993 (aged 26)	40	(Ireland) Leinster
Stuart McCloskey	Centre	6 August 1992 (aged 27)	3	(Ireland) Ulster
Garry Ringrose	Centre	26 January 1995 (aged 25)	28	(Ireland) Leinster
Andrew Conway	Wing	11 July 1991 (aged 28)	18	(Ireland) Munster
Keith Earls	Wing	2 October 1987 (aged 32)	82	(Ireland) Munster
Dave Kearney	Wing	19 June 1989 (aged 30)	19	(Ireland) Leinster
Jacob Stockdale	Wing	6 April 1996 (aged 23)	25	(Ireland) Ulster
Will Addison	Fullback	20 September 1992 (aged 27)	4	(Ireland) Ulster
Jordan Larmour	Fullback	10 June 1997 (aged 22)	21	(Ireland) Leinster

Call-ups
On 20 January, Stuart McCloskey was added to the squad due to a number of backs sustaining minor knocks.

On 3 February, Will Connors was added to the squad.

Player	Position	Date of birth (age)	Caps	Club/province
Stuart McCloskey	Centre	6 August 1992 (aged 27)	3	(Ireland) Ulster
Will Connors	Back row	4 April 1996 (aged 23)	0	(Ireland) Leinster

== Italy ==
On 19 January 2020, Italy named their 36-man squad for the 2020 Six Nations Championship.
On 20 January 2020, Giovanni Pettinelli replaces David Sisi.

Head coach: (South Africa) Franco Smith (interim)

Player	Position	Date of birth (age)	Caps	Club/province
Luca Bigi	Hooker	19 April 1991 (aged 28)	24	(Italy) Zebre
Oliviero Fabiani	Hooker	3 July 1990 (aged 29)	10	(Italy) Zebre
Federico Zani	Hooker	9 April 1989 (aged 30)	13	(Italy) Benetton
Pietro Ceccarelli	Prop	16 February 1992 (aged 27)	9	(Scotland) Edinburgh
Danilo Fischetti	Prop	26 January 1998 (aged 22)	0	(Italy) Zebre
Andrea Lovotti	Prop	28 July 1989 (aged 30)	41	(Italy) Zebre
Marco Riccioni	Prop	19 October 1997 (aged 22)	7	(Italy) Benetton
Giosuè Zilocchi	Prop	15 January 1997 (aged 23)	2	(Italy) Zebre
Dean Budd	Lock	31 July 1986 (aged 33)	26	(Italy) Benetton
Niccolò Cannone	Lock	17 May 1998 (aged 21)	0	(Italy) Petrarca / (Italy) Benetton
Federico Ruzza	Lock	4 August 1994 (aged 25)	18	(Italy) Benetton
Alessandro Zanni	Lock	31 January 1984 (aged 36)	117	(Italy) Benetton
Marco Lazzaroni	Back row	18 May 1995 (aged 24)	4	(Italy) Benetton
Giovanni Licata	Back row	18 February 1997 (aged 22)	8	(Italy) Zebre
Johan Meyer	Back row	26 February 1993 (aged 26)	4	(Italy) Zebre
Sebastian Negri	Back row	30 June 1994 (aged 25)	22	(Italy) Benetton
Giovanni Pettinelli	Back row	13 March 1996 (aged 23)	0	(Italy) Benetton
Jake Polledri	Back row	8 November 1995 (aged 24)	13	(England) Gloucester
Braam Steyn	Back row	2 May 1992 (aged 27)	36	(Italy) Benetton
Callum Braley	Scrum-half	20 March 1994 (aged 25)	5	(England) Gloucester
Guglielmo Palazzani	Scrum-half	11 April 1991 (aged 28)	36	(Italy) Zebre
Marcello Violi	Scrum-half	11 October 1993 (aged 26)	15	(Italy) Zebre
Tommaso Allan	Fly-half	26 April 1993 (aged 26)	54	(Italy) Benetton
Carlo Canna	Fly-half	25 August 1992 (aged 27)	39	(Italy) Zebre
Antonio Rizzi	Fly-half	5 January 1998 (aged 22)	0	(Italy) Benetton
Giulio Bisegni	Centre	4 April 1992 (aged 27)	14	(Italy) Zebre
Tommaso Boni	Centre	15 January 1993 (aged 27)	11	(Italy) Zebre
Luca Morisi	Centre	22 February 1991 (aged 28)	29	(Italy) Benetton
Alberto Sgarbi	Centre	26 November 1986 (aged 33)	29	(Italy) Benetton
Mattia Bellini	Wing	8 February 1994 (aged 25)	22	(Italy) Zebre
Tommaso Benvenuti	Wing	12 December 1990 (aged 29)	62	(Italy) Benetton
Leonardo Sarto	Wing	15 January 1992 (aged 28)	34	(Italy) Benetton
Matteo Minozzi	Wing	4 June 1996 (aged 23)	16	(England) Wasps
Michelangelo Biondelli	Fullback	15 October 1998 (aged 21)	0	(Italy) Zebre / (Italy) Fiamme Oro
Jayden Hayward	Fullback	11 February 1987 (aged 32)	23	(Italy) Benetton
Edoardo Padovani	Fullback	15 May 1993 (aged 26)	24	(Italy) Zebre

== Scotland ==
On 15 January 2020, Townsend named a 38-man squad.

Head coach: (Scotland) Gregor Townsend

Player	Position	Date of birth (age)	Caps	Club/province
Fraser Brown	Hooker	20 June 1989 (aged 30)	46	(Scotland) Glasgow Warriors
Stuart McInally	Hooker	9 August 1990 (aged 29)	33	(Scotland) Edinburgh
George Turner	Hooker	8 October 1992 (aged 27)	9	(Scotland) Glasgow Warriors
Simon Berghan	Prop	7 December 1990 (aged 29)	24	(Scotland) Edinburgh
Jamie Bhatti	Prop	8 September 1993 (aged 26)	15	(Scotland) Edinburgh
Allan Dell	Prop	16 March 1992 (aged 27)	28	(England) London Irish
Zander Fagerson	Prop	19 January 1996 (aged 24)	25	(Scotland) Glasgow Warriors
W. P. Nel	Prop	30 April 1986 (aged 33)	35	(Scotland) Edinburgh
Rory Sutherland	Prop	24 August 1992 (aged 27)	3	(Scotland) Edinburgh
Alex Craig	Lock	26 April 1997 (aged 22)	0	(England) Gloucester
Scott Cummings	Lock	3 December 1996 (aged 23)	8	(Scotland) Glasgow Warriors
Grant Gilchrist	Lock	9 August 1990 (aged 29)	40	(Scotland) Edinburgh
Jonny Gray	Lock	14 March 1994 (aged 25)	55	(Scotland) Glasgow Warriors
Ben Toolis	Lock	31 March 1992 (aged 27)	22	(Scotland) Edinburgh
Magnus Bradbury	Back row	23 August 1995 (aged 24)	11	(Scotland) Edinburgh
Luke Crosbie	Back row	22 April 1997 (aged 22)	0	(Scotland) Edinburgh
Cornell du Preez	Back row	23 March 1991 (aged 28)	6	(England) Worcester Warriors
Thomas Gordon	Back row	30 January 1997 (aged 23)	0	(Scotland) Glasgow Warriors
Nick Haining	Back row	1 September 1990 (aged 29)	0	(Scotland) Edinburgh
Jamie Ritchie	Back row	16 August 1996 (aged 23)	14	(Scotland) Edinburgh
Hamish Watson	Back row	15 October 1991 (aged 28)	28	(Scotland) Edinburgh
George Horne	Scrum-half	12 May 1995 (aged 24)	10	(Scotland) Glasgow Warriors
Ali Price	Scrum-half	12 May 1993 (aged 26)	28	(Scotland) Glasgow Warriors
Henry Pyrgos	Scrum-half	9 July 1989 (aged 30)	28	(Scotland) Edinburgh
Adam Hastings	Fly-half	5 October 1996 (aged 23)	16	(Scotland) Glasgow Warriors
Finn Russell	Fly-half	23 September 1992 (aged 27)	49	(France) Racing 92
Chris Harris	Centre	28 December 1990 (aged 29)	14	(England) Gloucester
Rory Hutchinson	Centre	29 January 1996 (aged 24)	3	(England) Northampton Saints
Sam Johnson	Centre	19 June 1993 (aged 26)	9	(Scotland) Glasgow Warriors
Huw Jones	Centre	17 December 1993 (aged 26)	23	(Scotland) Glasgow Warriors
Matt Scott	Centre	30 September 1990 (aged 29)	39	(Scotland) Edinburgh
Darcy Graham	Wing	21 June 1997 (aged 22)	11	(Scotland) Edinburgh
Sean Maitland	Wing	14 September 1988 (aged 31)	44	(England) Saracens
Byron McGuigan	Wing	20 August 1989 (aged 30)	9	(England) Sale Sharks
Kyle Steyn	Wing	29 January 1994 (aged 26)	0	(Scotland) Glasgow Warriors
Ratu Tagive	Wing	8 April 1991 (aged 28)	0	(Scotland) Glasgow Warriors
Stuart Hogg	Fullback	24 June 1992 (aged 27)	72	(England) Exeter Chiefs
Blair Kinghorn	Fullback	18 January 1997 (aged 23)	17	(Scotland) Edinburgh

Call-ups

On 24 January Duncan Weir was called up to join the squad.

On 16 February Sam Skinner and Matt Fagerson were added to the squad, with Alex Craig being released back to his club.

On 1 March Lewis Carmichael was added to the squad, with Cornell du Preez being released back to his club.

Player	Position	Date of birth (age)	Caps	Club/province
Lewis Carmichael	Lock	2 May 1995 (aged 24)	2	(Scotland) Edinburgh
Sam Skinner	Lock	31 January 1995 (aged 25)	6	(England) Exeter Chiefs
Matt Fagerson	Back row	16 July 1998 (aged 21)	5	(Scotland) Glasgow Warriors
Duncan Weir	Fly-half	10 May 1991 (aged 28)	27	(England) Worcester Warriors

== Wales ==
On 15 January 2020, Pivac announced a 38-man squad.

Head coach: (New Zealand) Wayne Pivac

Player	Position	Date of birth (age)	Caps	Club/province
Elliot Dee	Hooker	7 March 1994 (aged 25)	29	(Wales) Dragons
Ryan Elias	Hooker	7 January 1995 (aged 25)	9	(Wales) Scarlets
Ken Owens	Hooker	3 January 1987 (aged 33)	73	(Wales) Scarlets
Rhys Carre	Prop	8 February 1998 (aged 21)	6	(England) Saracens
Leon Brown	Prop	26 October 1996 (aged 23)	6	(Wales) Dragons
Rob Evans	Prop	14 April 1992 (aged 27)	36	(Wales) Scarlets
WillGriff John	Prop	4 December 1992 (aged 27)	0	(England) Sale Sharks
Wyn Jones	Prop	26 February 1992 (aged 27)	22	(Wales) Scarlets
Dillon Lewis	Prop	4 January 1996 (aged 24)	22	(Wales) Cardiff Blues
Jake Ball	Lock	27 June 1991 (aged 28)	42	(Wales) Scarlets
Adam Beard	Lock	7 January 1996 (aged 24)	20	(Wales) Ospreys
Seb Davies	Lock	17 May 1996 (aged 23)	7	(Wales) Cardiff Blues
Cory Hill	Lock	10 February 1992 (aged 27)	24	(Wales) Dragons
Alun Wyn Jones	Lock	19 September 1985 (aged 34)	134	(Wales) Ospreys
Will Rowlands	Lock	19 September 1991 (aged 28)	0	(England) Wasps
Taulupe Faletau	Back row	12 November 1990 (aged 29)	72	(England) Bath
Ross Moriarty	Back row	12 November 1990 (aged 29)	41	(Wales) Dragons
Josh Navidi	Back row	30 December 1990 (aged 29)	23	(Wales) Cardiff Blues
Aaron Shingler	Back row	7 August 1987 (aged 32)	26	(Wales) Scarlets
Justin Tipuric	Back row	6 August 1989 (aged 30)	72	(Wales) Ospreys
Aaron Wainwright	Back row	25 September 1997 (aged 22)	18	(Wales) Dragons
Gareth Davies	Scrum-half	18 August 1990 (aged 29)	51	(Wales) Scarlets
Rhys Webb	Scrum-half	9 December 1988 (aged 31)	31	(France) Toulon
Tomos Williams	Scrum-half	1 January 1995 (aged 25)	16	(Wales) Cardiff Blues
Dan Biggar	Fly-half	16 October 1989 (aged 30)	79	(England) Northampton Saints
Jarrod Evans	Fly-half	25 July 1996 (aged 23)	3	(Wales) Cardiff Blues
Owen Williams	Fly-half	27 February 1992 (aged 27)	3	(England) Gloucester
Hadleigh Parkes	Centre	5 October 1987 (aged 32)	25	(Wales) Scarlets
Nick Tompkins	Centre	16 February 1995 (aged 24)	0	(England) Saracens
Owen Watkin	Centre	12 October 1996 (aged 23)	22	(Wales) Ospreys
Josh Adams	Wing	21 April 1995 (aged 24)	21	(Wales) Cardiff Blues
Owen Lane	Wing	20 December 1997 (aged 22)	2	(Wales) Cardiff Blues
Johnny McNicholl	Wing	24 September 1990 (aged 29)	0	(Wales) Scarlets
George North	Wing	13 April 1992 (aged 27)	91	(Wales) Ospreys
Louis Rees-Zammit	Wing	2 February 2001 (aged 18)	0	(England) Gloucester
Leigh Halfpenny	Fullback	22 December 1988 (aged 31)	85	(Wales) Scarlets
Jonah Holmes	Fullback	24 July 1992 (aged 27)	3	(England) Leicester Tigers
Liam Williams	Fullback	9 April 1991 (aged 28)	62	(England) Saracens
