= 2022 Six Nations Championship squads =

Rugby union competition squads

The 2022 Six Nations Championship is the 23rd Six Nations Championship, an annual rugby union competition contested by the national teams of England, France, Ireland, Italy, Scotland and Wales. England are the defending champions. There is no limit on the number of players each team may call up to play in the competition, and initial squad sizes ranged from 33 to 42.

Note: Number of caps and players' ages are indicated as of 5 February 2022 – the tournament's opening day. For players added to a squad during the tournament, their caps and age are indicated as of the date of their call-up.

== England ==
England coach Eddie Jones named an initial 36-man squad for the tournament on 18 January 2022, including six uncapped players.

Head coach: (Australia) Eddie Jones

Player	Position	Date of birth (age)	Caps	Club/province
Jamie Blamire	Hooker	22 December 1997 (aged 24)	5	Newcastle Falcons
Luke Cowan-Dickie	Hooker	20 June 1993 (aged 28)	31	Exeter Chiefs
Jamie George	Hooker	20 October 1990 (aged 31)	61	Saracens
Ellis Genge	Prop	16 February 1995 (aged 26)	31	Leicester Tigers
Joe Heyes	Prop	13 April 1999 (aged 22)	2	Leicester Tigers
Joe Marler	Prop	7 July 1990 (aged 31)	74	Harlequins
Bevan Rodd	Prop	26 August 2000 (aged 21)	2	Sale Sharks
Kyle Sinckler	Prop	30 March 1993 (aged 28)	47	Bristol Bears
Will Stuart	Prop	12 July 1996 (aged 25)	15	Bath
Ollie Chessum	Lock	6 September 2000 (aged 21)	0	Leicester Tigers
Charlie Ewels	Lock	29 June 1995 (aged 26)	26	Bath
Jonny Hill	Lock	8 June 1994 (aged 27)	12	Exeter Chiefs
Maro Itoje	Lock	28 October 1994 (aged 27)	51	Saracens
Courtney Lawes	Lock	23 February 1989 (aged 32)	90	Northampton Saints
Alfie Barbeary	Back row	5 October 2000 (aged 21)	0	Wasps
Tom Curry	Back row	15 June 1998 (aged 23)	36	Sale Sharks
Alex Dombrandt	Back row	29 April 1997 (aged 24)	4	Harlequins
Lewis Ludlam	Back row	8 December 1995 (aged 26)	10	Northampton Saints
Sam Simmonds	Back row	10 November 1994 (aged 27)	9	Exeter Chiefs
Raffi Quirke	Scrum-half	18 August 2001 (aged 20)	2	Sale Sharks
Harry Randall	Scrum-half	18 December 1997 (aged 24)	2	Bristol Bears
Ben Youngs	Scrum-half	5 September 1989 (aged 32)	112	Leicester Tigers
Orlando Bailey	Fly-half	29 September 2001 (aged 20)	0	Bath
Owen Farrell	Fly-half	24 September 1991 (aged 30)	94	Saracens
Marcus Smith	Fly-half	14 February 1999 (aged 22)	5	Harlequins
Mark Atkinson	Centre	8 March 1990 (aged 31)	1	Gloucester
Joe Marchant	Centre	16 July 1996 (aged 25)	7	Harlequins
Luke Northmore	Centre	16 March 1997 (aged 24)	0	Harlequins
Henry Slade	Centre	19 March 1993 (aged 28)	43	Exeter Chiefs
Ollie Hassell-Collins	Wing	17 January 1999 (aged 23)	0	London Irish
Jonny May	Wing	1 April 1990 (aged 31)	69	Gloucester
Jack Nowell	Wing	4 November 1993 (aged 28)	34	Exeter Chiefs
Tommy Freeman	Fullback	5 March 2001 (aged 20)	0	Northampton Saints
George Furbank	Fullback	17 October 1996 (aged 25)	5	Northampton Saints
Max Malins	Fullback	7 January 1997 (aged 25)	10	Saracens
Freddie Steward	Fullback	5 December 2000 (aged 21)	5	Leicester Tigers

=== Call-ups ===
On 24 January, Jonny May withdrew from the squad due to injury and was replaced by Elliot Daly. In addition, George Ford was called up to replace Owen Farrell, who was ruled out of the tournament on 26 January. Nick Isiekwe also joined the squad as injury cover for Courtney Lawes.

On 30 January, Louis Lynagh and Adam Radwan were added to the squad.

On 8 February, Joe Launchbury and Tom Pearson were called up to the squad, while Orlando Bailey was released.

On 15 February, Manu Tuilagi joined up with the squad.

On 1 March, Will Goodrick-Clarke and Lewis Ludlow were included in a fallow week training squad, before returning to their clubs.

On 6 March, Nic Dolly, Alex Mitchell and Sam Underhill were recalled as part of a revised 36-man squad. Luke Cowan-Dickie, Jonny Hill, Lewis Ludlam, Raffi Quirke and Manu Tuilagi were all withdrawn due to injury, while Mark Atkinson, Tommy Freeman, Tom Pearson and Adam Radwan were also released back to their clubs.

On 14 March, Tom Curry withdrew from the squad because of injury, and was replaced by Jack Willis.

Player	Position	Date of birth (age)	Caps	Club/province
Nic Dolly	Hooker	11 June 1999 (aged 22)	1	Leicester Tigers
Nick Isiekwe	Lock	20 April 1998 (aged 23)	3	Saracens
Joe Launchbury	Lock	12 April 1991 (aged 30)	69	Wasps
Tom Pearson	Back row	26 October 1999 (aged 22)	0	London Irish
Sam Underhill	Back row	22 July 1996 (aged 25)	27	Bath
Jack Willis	Back row	24 December 1996 (aged 25)	3	Wasps
Alex Mitchell	Scrum-half	25 May 1997 (aged 24)	1	Northampton Saints
George Ford	Fly-half	16 March 1993 (aged 28)	77	Leicester Tigers
Manu Tuilagi	Centre	18 May 1991 (aged 30)	46	Sale Sharks
Elliot Daly	Wing	8 October 1992 (aged 29)	52	Saracens
Louis Lynagh	Wing	3 December 2000 (aged 21)	0	Harlequins
Adam Radwan	Wing	30 December 1997 (aged 24)	2	Newcastle Falcons

== France ==
On 18 January 2022, France coach Fabien Galthié named a 42-man squad for the 2022 Six Nations Championship.

Head coach: Fabien Galthié

Player	Position	Date of birth (age)	Caps	Club/province
Gaëtan Barlot	Hooker	13 April 1997 (aged 24)	4	(France) Castres
Julien Marchand	Hooker	10 May 1995 (aged 26)	16	(France) Toulouse
Peato Mauvaka	Hooker	10 January 1997 (aged 25)	9	(France) Toulouse
Uini Atonio	Prop	26 March 1990 (aged 31)	39	(France) La Rochelle
Cyril Baille	Prop	15 September 1993 (aged 28)	31	(France) Toulouse
Demba Bamba	Prop	17 March 1998 (aged 23)	20	(France) Lyon
Daniel Bibi Biziwu	Prop	29 August 2001 (aged 20)	0	(France) Clermont
Jean-Baptiste Gros	Prop	29 May 1999 (aged 22)	14	(France) Toulon
Mohamed Haouas	Prop	9 March 1994 (aged 27)	13	(France) Montpellier
Thibaud Flament	Lock	29 April 1997 (aged 24)	3	(France) Toulouse
Bernard Le Roux	Lock	4 June 1989 (aged 32)	47	(France) Racing 92
Romain Taofifénua	Lock	14 September 1990 (aged 31)	31	(France) Lyon
Florent Vanverberghe	Lock	22 July 2000 (aged 21)	0	(France) Castres
Florian Verhaeghe	Lock	27 April 1997 (aged 24)	0	(France) Montpellier
Paul Willemse	Lock	13 November 1992 (aged 29)	19	(France) Montpellier
Grégory Alldritt	Back row	23 March 1997 (aged 24)	26	(France) La Rochelle
Dylan Cretin	Back row	4 May 1997 (aged 24)	13	(France) Lyon
François Cros	Back row	25 March 1994 (aged 27)	11	(France) Toulouse
Ibrahim Diallo	Back row	23 January 1998 (aged 24)	1	(France) Racing 92
Anthony Jelonch	Back row	28 July 1996 (aged 25)	14	(France) Toulouse
Sekou Macalou	Back row	20 April 1995 (aged 26)	7	(France) Stade Français
Yoan Tanga	Back row	29 November 1996 (aged 25)	0	(France) Racing 92
Cameron Woki	Back row	7 November 1998 (aged 23)	11	(France) Bordeaux
Baptiste Couilloud	Scrum-half	22 July 1997 (aged 24)	8	(France) Lyon
Antoine Dupont	Scrum-half	15 November 1996 (aged 25)	35	(France) Toulouse
Maxime Lucu	Scrum-half	12 January 1993 (aged 29)	2	(France) Bordeaux
Léo Berdeu	Fly-half	13 June 1998 (aged 23)	0	(France) Lyon
Antoine Hastoy	Fly-half	4 June 1997 (aged 24)	1	(France) Pau
Romain Ntamack	Fly-half	1 May 1999 (aged 22)	23	(France) Toulouse
Jonathan Danty	Centre	7 October 1992 (age 33)	11	(France) La Rochelle
Jules Favre	Centre	22 March 1999 (aged 22)	0	(France) La Rochelle
Gaël Fickou	Centre	26 March 1994 (aged 27)	66	(France) Racing 92
Yoram Moefana	Centre	18 July 2000 (aged 21)	2	(France) Bordeaux
Virimi Vakatawa	Centre	1 May 1992 (aged 29)	30	(France) Racing 92
Tani Vili	Centre	31 October 2000 (aged 21)	0	(France) Clermont
Matthis Lebel	Wing	25 March 1999 (aged 22)	1	(France) Toulouse
Damian Penaud	Wing	25 September 1996 (aged 25)	28	(France) Clermont
Teddy Thomas	Wing	18 September 1993 (aged 28)	28	(France) Racing 92
Gabin Villière	Wing	13 December 1995 (aged 26)	8	(France) Toulon
Brice Dulin	Fullback	13 April 1990 (aged 31)	36	(France) La Rochelle
Melvyn Jaminet	Fullback	30 June 1999 (aged 22)	6	(France) Perpignan
Thomas Ramos	Fullback	23 July 1995 (aged 26)	14	(France) Toulouse

== Ireland ==
On 19 January 2022, Ireland coach Andy Farrell named a 37-man squad for the tournament, including two uncapped players. Flanker Cian Prendergast was also included as an additional development player, who would participate in the training camp.

Head coach: (England) Andy Farrell

Player	Position	Date of birth (age)	Caps	Club/province
Rob Herring	Hooker	27 April 1990 (aged 31)	23	Ulster
Rónan Kelleher	Hooker	21 January 1998 (aged 24)	16	Leinster
Dan Sheehan	Hooker	17 September 1998 (aged 23)	2	Leinster
Finlay Bealham	Prop	9 October 1991 (aged 30)	18	Connacht
Tadhg Furlong	Prop	14 November 1992 (aged 29)	52	Leinster
Cian Healy	Prop	7 October 1987 (aged 34)	112	Leinster
Dave Kilcoyne	Prop	14 December 1988 (aged 33)	45	Munster
Tom O'Toole	Prop	23 September 1998 (aged 23)	2	Ulster
Andrew Porter	Prop	16 January 1996 (aged 26)	40	Leinster
Ryan Baird	Lock	26 July 1999 (aged 22)	6	Leinster
Tadhg Beirne	Lock	8 January 1992 (aged 30)	25	Munster
Iain Henderson	Lock	21 February 1992 (aged 29)	65	Ulster
James Ryan	Lock	24 July 1996 (aged 25)	40	Leinster
Kieran Treadwell	Lock	6 November 1995 (aged 26)	3	Ulster
Jack Conan	Back row	29 July 1992 (aged 29)	22	Leinster
Gavin Coombes	Back row	11 December 1997 (aged 24)	2	Munster
Caelan Doris	Back row	2 April 1998 (aged 23)	12	Leinster
Peter O'Mahony	Back row	17 September 1989 (aged 32)	79	Munster
Cian Prendergast	Back row	23 February 2000 (aged 21)	0	Connacht
Nick Timoney	Back row	1 August 1995 (aged 26)	2	Ulster
Josh van der Flier	Back row	25 April 1993 (aged 28)	35	Leinster
Craig Casey	Scrum-half	19 April 1999 (aged 22)	4	Munster
Jamison Gibson-Park	Scrum-half	23 February 1992 (aged 29)	12	Leinster
Conor Murray	Scrum-half	20 April 1989 (aged 32)	92	Munster
Jack Carty	Fly-half	31 August 1992 (aged 29)	10	Connacht
Joey Carbery	Fly-half	1 November 1995 (aged 26)	27	Munster
Johnny Sexton (c)	Fly-half	11 July 1985 (aged 36)	101	Leinster
Bundee Aki	Centre	7 April 1990 (aged 31)	33	Connacht
Robbie Henshaw	Centre	12 June 1993 (aged 28)	53	Leinster
James Hume	Centre	7 September 1998 (aged 23)	1	Ulster
Garry Ringrose	Centre	26 January 1995 (aged 27)	37	Leinster
Robert Baloucoune	Wing	19 August 1997 (aged 24)	2	Ulster
Andrew Conway	Wing	11 July 1991 (aged 30)	27	Munster
Keith Earls	Wing	2 October 1987 (aged 34)	96	Munster
Mack Hansen	Wing	27 March 1998 (aged 23)	0	Connacht
Hugo Keenan	Fullback	18 June 1996 (aged 25)	16	Leinster
Jordan Larmour	Fullback	10 June 1997 (aged 24)	30	Leinster
Michael Lowry	Fullback	20 August 1998 (aged 23)	0	Ulster

=== Call-ups ===
On 7 February, Dave Heffernan replaced the injured Rónan Kelleher.

On 21 February, James Lowe and Jimmy O'Brien were added to the squad.

On 7 March, Jeremy Loughman was called up to the squad ahead of the final two rounds of the Championship.

Player	Position	Date of birth (age)	Caps	Club/province
Dave Heffernan	Hooker	31 January 1991 (aged 31)	6	Connacht
Jeremy Loughman	Prop	22 July 1995 (aged 26)	0	Munster
James Lowe	Wing	8 July 1992 (aged 29)	10	Leinster
Jimmy O'Brien	Fullback	27 November 1996 (aged 25)	0	Leinster

== Italy ==
Italy named a 33-man squad for the tournament on 13 January 2022.

Head coach: (New Zealand) Kieran Crowley

Player	Position	Date of birth (age)	Caps	Club/province
Hame Faiva	Hooker	9 May 1994 (aged 27)	1	(Italy) Benetton / (Italy) Rovigo Delta
Gianmarco Lucchesi	Hooker	10 September 2000 (aged 21)	8	(Italy) Benetton
Giacomo Nicotera	Hooker	15 July 1996 (aged 25)	0	(Italy) Benetton
Pietro Ceccarelli	Prop	16 February 1992 (aged 29)	17	(France) Brive
Danilo Fischetti	Prop	26 January 1998 (aged 24)	15	(Italy) Zebre Parma
Ivan Nemer	Prop	22 April 1998 (aged 23)	3	(Italy) Benetton
Tiziano Pasquali	Prop	14 July 1994 (aged 27)	21	(Italy) Benetton
Cherif Traorè	Prop	10 April 1994 (aged 27)	12	(Italy) Benetton
Giosuè Zilocchi	Prop	15 January 1997 (aged 25)	15	(Italy) Zebre Parma
Niccolò Cannone	Lock	17 May 1998 (aged 23)	15	(Italy) Benetton
Marco Fuser	Lock	9 March 1991 (aged 30)	36	(England) Newcastle Falcons
Federico Ruzza	Lock	4 August 1994 (aged 27)	25	(Italy) Benetton
David Sisi	Lock	5 February 1993 (aged 29)	18	(Italy) Zebre Parma
Toa Halafihi	Back row	27 November 1993 (aged 28)	0	(Italy) Benetton
Michele Lamaro (c)	Back row	3 June 1998 (aged 23)	10	(Italy) Benetton
Sebastian Negri	Back row	30 June 1994 (aged 27)	36	(Italy) Benetton
Giovanni Pettinelli	Back row	13 March 1996 (aged 25)	1	(Italy) Benetton
Braam Steyn	Back row	2 May 1992 (aged 29)	46	(Italy) Benetton
Manuel Zuliani	Back row	26 April 2000 (aged 21)	0	(Italy) Benetton
Callum Braley	Scrum-half	24 March 1994 (aged 27)	12	(Italy) Benetton
Alessandro Fusco	Scrum-half	28 October 1999 (aged 22)	2	(Italy) Zebre Parma
Stephen Varney	Scrum-half	16 May 2001 (aged 20)	9	(England) Gloucester
Giacomo Da Re	Fly-half	29 March 1999 (aged 22)	0	(Italy) Benetton / (Italy) Rovigo Delta
Paolo Garbisi	Fly-half	26 April 2000 (aged 21)	13	(France) Montpellier
Leonardo Marin	Fly-half	23 February 2002 (aged 19)	0	(Italy) Benetton
Ignacio Brex	Centre	26 May 1992 (aged 29)	8	(Italy) Benetton
Luca Morisi	Centre	22 February 1991 (aged 30)	36	(Italy) Benetton
Marco Zanon	Centre	3 October 1997 (aged 24)	7	(Italy) Benetton
Pierre Bruno	Wing	28 June 1996 (aged 25)	1	(Italy) Zebre Parma
Monty Ioane	Wing	30 October 1994 (aged 27)	9	(Italy) Benetton
Tommaso Menoncello	Wing	20 August 2002 (aged 19)	0	(Italy) Benetton / (Italy) F.I.R. Academy
Federico Mori	Wing	13 October 2000 (aged 21)	11	(France) Bordeaux
Edoardo Padovani	Fullback	15 March 1993 (aged 28)	30	(Italy) Benetton

=== Call-ups ===
On 24 January, Ange Capuozzo was added to the squad.

On 31 January, Ion Neculai and Enrico Lucchin were added to the squad, with Lucchin initially replacing Luca Morisi due to injury.

On 7 February Andrea Zambonin joined the squad ahead of round 2.

On 23 February Renato Giammarioli and Andrea Lovotti replace Fuser, Negri, Capuozzo, Da Re and Menoncello.

Player	Position	Date of birth (age)	Caps	Club/province
Andrea Lovotti	Prop	28 July 1989 (aged 32)	47	(Italy) Zebre Parma
Ion Neculai	Prop	25 January 2001 (aged 21)	0	(Italy) Zebre Parma
Andrea Zambonin	Lock	3 September 2000 (aged 21)	1	(Italy) Zebre Parma
Renato Giammarioli	Back row	23 March 1995 (aged 26)	5	(Italy) Zebre Parma
Enrico Lucchin	Centre	4 April 1995 (aged 26)	0	(Italy) Zebre Parma
Ange Capuozzo	Fullback	30 April 1999 (aged 22)	0	(France) Grenoble

== Scotland ==
Scotland named a 39-man squad for the tournament on 19 January 2022, including five uncapped players.

Head coach: Gregor Townsend

Player	Position	Date of birth (age)	Caps	Club/province
Ewan Ashman	Hooker	3 April 2000 (aged 21)	2	(England) Sale Sharks
Stuart McInally	Hooker	9 August 1990 (aged 31)	43	(Scotland) Edinburgh
George Turner	Hooker	8 October 1992 (aged 29)	20	(Scotland) Glasgow Warriors
Jamie Bhatti	Prop	8 September 1993 (aged 28)	22	(Scotland) Glasgow Warriors
Zander Fagerson	Prop	19 January 1996 (aged 26)	42	(Scotland) Glasgow Warriors
WP Nel	Prop	30 April 1986 (aged 35)	43	(Scotland) Edinburgh
Pierre Schoeman	Prop	7 May 1994 (aged 27)	4	(Scotland) Edinburgh
Javan Sebastian	Prop	27 September 1994 (aged 27)	1	(Wales) Scarlets
Rory Sutherland	Prop	24 August 1992 (aged 29)	16	(England) Worcester Warriors
Scott Cummings	Lock	3 December 1996 (aged 25)	21	(Scotland) Glasgow Warriors
Grant Gilchrist	Lock	9 August 1990 (aged 31)	48	(Scotland) Edinburgh
Jonny Gray	Lock	24 March 1994 (aged 27)	64	(England) Exeter Chiefs
Jamie Hodgson	Lock	19 March 1998 (aged 23)	3	(Scotland) Edinburgh
Sam Skinner	Lock	31 January 1995 (aged 27)	15	(England) Exeter Chiefs
Josh Bayliss	Back row	18 September 1997 (aged 24)	2	(England) Bath
Magnus Bradbury	Back row	23 August 1995 (aged 26)	14	(Scotland) Edinburgh
Andy Christie	Back row	27 March 1999 (aged 22)	0	(England) Saracens
Rory Darge	Back row	23 February 2000 (aged 21)	0	(Scotland) Glasgow Warriors
Matt Fagerson	Back row	16 July 1998 (aged 23)	17	(Scotland) Glasgow Warriors
Nick Haining	Back row	1 September 1990 (aged 31)	10	(Scotland) Edinburgh
Jamie Ritchie	Back row	16 August 1996 (aged 25)	31	(Scotland) Edinburgh
Hamish Watson	Back row	15 October 1991 (aged 30)	45	(Scotland) Edinburgh
Ali Price	Scrum-half	12 May 1993 (aged 28)	46	(Scotland) Glasgow Warriors
Ben Vellacott	Scrum-half	28 March 1995 (aged 26)	0	(Scotland) Edinburgh
Ben White	Scrum-half	27 May 1998 (aged 23)	0	(England) London Irish
Finn Russell	Fly-half	23 September 1992 (aged 29)	58	(France) Racing 92
Mark Bennett	Centre	3 February 1993 (aged 29)	22	(Scotland) Edinburgh
Chris Harris	Centre	28 December 1990 (aged 31)	31	(England) Gloucester
Rory Hutchinson	Centre	29 January 1996 (aged 26)	5	(England) Northampton Saints
Sam Johnson	Centre	19 June 1993 (aged 28)	21	(Scotland) Glasgow Warriors
Cameron Redpath	Centre	23 December 1999 (aged 22)	1	(England) Bath
Sione Tuipulotu	Centre	12 February 1997 (aged 24)	1	(Scotland) Glasgow Warriors
Darcy Graham	Wing	21 June 1997 (aged 24)	22	(Scotland) Edinburgh
Rufus McLean	Wing	2 March 2000 (aged 21)	2	(Scotland) Glasgow Warriors
Kyle Rowe	Wing	8 February 1998 (aged 23)	0	(England) London Irish
Kyle Steyn	Wing	29 January 1994 (aged 28)	3	(Scotland) Glasgow Warriors
Duhan van der Merwe	Wing	4 June 1995 (aged 26)	13	(England) Worcester Warriors
Stuart Hogg	Fullback	24 June 1992 (aged 29)	88	(England) Exeter Chiefs
Blair Kinghorn	Fullback	18 January 1997 (aged 25)	28	(Scotland) Edinburgh

=== Call-ups ===
On 25 January, Sean Maitland was added to the squad after Kyle Rowe and Duhan van der Merwe were unable to report to the pre-tournament training camp due to illness.

On 31 January, Jamie Bhatti withdrew from the squad due to injury and was replaced by Allan Dell.

On 21 February, Scotland announced an updated squad for their match against France, which included the new inclusions of Simon Berghan, James Lang, Oli Kebble, Ollie Smith and Marshall Sykes.

On 7 March, Adam Hastings, Ross Thompson and Glen Young were called up to the squad whilst Marshall Sykes, Nick Haining, Oli Kebble, Ollie Smith, Rufus McLean withdrew after due to injury.

On 14 March, Fraser Brown, Murphy Walker, Scott Cummings and Jordan Edmunds were added to the squad ahead of Ireland whilst Kiran McDonald, Glen Young and Duhan van der Merwe returned to their clubs.

Player	Position	Date of birth (age)	Caps	Club/province
Fraser Brown	Hooker	20 June 1989 (aged 32)	54	(Scotland) Glasgow Warriors
Simon Berghan	Prop	7 December 1990 (aged 31)	31	(Scotland) Glasgow Warriors
Allan Dell	Prop	16 March 1992 (aged 29)	32	(England) London Irish
Oli Kebble	Prop	18 June 1992 (aged 29)	11	(Scotland) Glasgow Warriors
Murphy Walker	Prop	25 October 1999 (aged 22)	0	(Scotland) Glasgow Warriors
Kiran McDonald	Lock	11 January 1994 (aged 28)	0	(Scotland) Glasgow Warriors
Marshall Sykes	Lock	29 December 1999 (aged 22)	1	(Scotland) Edinburgh
Glen Young	Lock	4 November 1994 (aged 27)	0	(Scotland) Edinburgh
Adam Hastings	Fly-half	5 October 1996 (aged 25)	25	(England) Gloucester
Ross Thompson	Fly-half	10 April 1999 (aged 22)	1	(Scotland) Glasgow Warriors
James Lang	Centre	3 May 1995 (aged 26)	6	(Scotland) Edinburgh
Jordan Edmunds	Wing		0	(Scotland) Boroughmuir RFC
Sean Maitland	Wing	14 September 1988 (aged 33)	53	(England) Saracens
Ollie Smith	Fullback	8 July 2000 (aged 21)	0	(Scotland) Glasgow Warriors

== Wales ==
Wales named a 36-man squad for the tournament on 18 January 2022. Usual captain Alun Wyn Jones was ruled out of the start of the tournament, so fly-half Dan Biggar was named as his replacement. The squad included three uncapped players: hooker Dewi Lake, and back rowers Jac Morgan and James Ratti.

Head coach: (New Zealand) Wayne Pivac

Player	Position	Date of birth (age)	Caps	Club/province
Ryan Elias	Hooker	7 January 1995 (aged 27)	23	(Wales) Scarlets
Dewi Lake	Hooker	16 May 1999 (aged 22)	0	(Wales) Ospreys
Bradley Roberts	Hooker	4 January 1996 (aged 26)	1	(Ireland) Ulster
Leon Brown	Prop	26 October 1996 (aged 25)	16	(Wales) Dragons
Rhys Carré	Prop	8 February 1998 (aged 23)	16	(Wales) Cardiff
Tomas Francis	Prop	27 April 1992 (aged 29)	60	(Wales) Ospreys
Wyn Jones	Prop	26 February 1992 (aged 29)	38	(Wales) Scarlets
Dillon Lewis	Prop	4 January 1996 (aged 26)	34	(Wales) Cardiff
Gareth Thomas	Prop	2 August 1993 (aged 28)	5	(Wales) Ospreys
Adam Beard	Lock	7 January 1996 (aged 26)	29	(Wales) Ospreys
Ben Carter	Lock	23 January 2001 (aged 21)	5	(Wales) Dragons
Seb Davies	Lock	17 May 1996 (aged 25)	13	(Wales) Cardiff
Will Rowlands	Lock	19 September 1991 (aged 30)	13	(Wales) Dragons
Christ Tshiunza	Lock	9 January 2002 (aged 20)	2	(England) Exeter Chiefs
Taine Basham	Back row	2 November 1999 (aged 22)	7	(Wales) Dragons
Ellis Jenkins	Back row	29 April 1993 (aged 28)	14	(Wales) Cardiff
Jac Morgan	Back row	21 January 2000 (aged 22)	0	(Wales) Ospreys
Ross Moriarty	Back row	18 April 1994 (aged 27)	49	(Wales) Cardiff
James Ratti	Back row	14 October 1997 (aged 24)	0	(Wales) Cardiff
Aaron Wainwright	Back row	25 September 1997 (aged 24)	34	(Wales) Dragons
Gareth Davies	Scrum-half	18 August 1990 (aged 31)	65	(Wales) Scarlets
Kieran Hardy	Scrum-half	30 November 1995 (aged 26)	8	(Wales) Scarlets
Tomos Williams	Scrum-half	1 January 1995 (aged 27)	29	(Wales) Cardiff
Gareth Anscombe	Fly-half	10 May 1991 (aged 30)	29	(Wales) Ospreys
Dan Biggar (c)	Fly-half	16 October 1989 (aged 32)	95	(England) Northampton Saints
Rhys Priestland	Fly-half	9 January 1987 (aged 35)	52	(Wales) Cardiff
Callum Sheedy	Fly-half	28 October 1995 (aged 26)	13	(England) Bristol Bears
Jonathan Davies	Centre	5 April 1988 (aged 33)	93	(Wales) Scarlets
Willis Halaholo	Centre	6 July 1990 (aged 31)	9	(Wales) Cardiff
Nick Tompkins	Centre	16 February 1995 (aged 26)	16	(England) Saracens
Owen Watkin	Centre	12 October 1996 (aged 25)	26	(Wales) Ospreys
Josh Adams	Wing	21 April 1995 (aged 26)	35	(Wales) Cardiff
Alex Cuthbert	Wing	5 April 1990 (aged 31)	48	(Wales) Ospreys
Louis Rees-Zammit	Wing	2 February 2001 (aged 21)	12	(England) Gloucester
Johnny McNicholl	Fullback	24 September 1990 (aged 31)	8	(Wales) Scarlets
Liam Williams	Fullback	9 April 1991 (aged 30)	74	(Wales) Scarlets

=== Call-ups ===
On 21 February, Taulupe Faletau was called up to the squad after recovering from injury.

On 6 March, Josh Navidi was called up to the squad with Ellis Jenkins being released back to his club.

On 12 March, Alun Wyn Jones was called up to the squad following recovery from injury.

Player	Position	Date of birth (age)	Caps	Club/province
Alun Wyn Jones	Lock	19 September 1985 (aged 36)	149	(Wales) Ospreys
Taulupe Faletau	Back row	12 November 1990 (aged 31)	86	(England) Bath
Josh Navidi	Back row	30 December 1990 (aged 31)	28	(Wales) Cardiff
