= 2020 Six Nations Championship =

Rugby union competition in Europe

- Date: 1 February – 31 October 2020
- Countries: England; France; Ireland; Italy; Scotland; Wales

Tournament statistics
- Champions: England (29th title)
- Triple Crown: England (26th title)
- Matches played: 15
- Attendance: 727,458 (48,497 per match)
- Tries scored: 74 (4.93 per match)
- Top point scorer: (France) Romain Ntamack (57)
- Top try scorer: (France) Charles Ollivon (4)
- Player of the tournament: (France) Antoine Dupont
- Official website: sixnationsrugby.com

The 2020 Six Nations Championship (known as the Guinness Six Nations for sponsorship reasons) was the 21st Six Nations Championship, the annual rugby union competition contested by the national teams of England, France, Ireland, Italy, Scotland, and Wales, and the 126th edition of the competition (including all the tournament's previous versions as the Home Nations Championship and Five Nations Championship). The tournament began on 1 February 2020, and was scheduled to conclude on 14 March; however, due to the COVID-19 pandemic, Italy's penultimate match against Ireland and all three of the final weekend's matches were postponed with the intention of being rescheduled. It was the first time any match had been postponed since 2012, and the first time more than one match had been delayed since the outbreak of foot-and-mouth disease in 2001. In July 2020, a revised fixture schedule was announced, with the last four games being played in October.

England became the first team to win the title despite losing their first game since Wales did so in 2013. It was England's 39th title overall (including shared titles), drawing them level with the record Wales set the previous year, and extended their record of 29 outright titles.

== Participants ==
Nation	Stadium			Head coach	Captain
Nation	Home stadium	Capacity	Location	Head coach	Captain
England	Twickenham Stadium	82,000	London	(Australia) Eddie Jones	Owen Farrell
France	Stade de France	81,338	Saint-Denis	(France) Fabien Galthié	Charles Ollivon
Ireland	Aviva Stadium	51,700	Dublin	(England) Andy Farrell	Johnny Sexton
Italy	Stadio Olimpico	73,261	Rome	(South Africa) Franco Smith	Luca Bigi
Scotland	Murrayfield Stadium	67,144	Edinburgh	(Scotland) Gregor Townsend	Stuart Hogg
Wales	Millennium Stadium	73,931	Cardiff	(New Zealand) Wayne Pivac	Alun Wyn Jones
Wales	Parc y Scarlets (Note: Wales final game was scheduled for Parc y Scarlets in Llanelli as the Millennium Stadium was unavailable due to being used as Dragon's Heart Hospital.)	14,870	Llanelli	(New Zealand) Wayne Pivac	Alun Wyn Jones

== Table ==
Pos	Team	Pld	W	D	L	PF	PA	PD	TF	TA	GS	TB	LB	Pts
1	England	5	4	0	1	121	77	+44	14	9	0	1	1	18
2	France	5	4	0	1	138	117	+21	17	13	0	2	0	18
3	Ireland	5	3	0	2	132	102	+30	17	11	0	2	0	14
4	Scotland	5	3	0	2	77	59	+18	7	5	0	0	2	14
5	Wales	5	1	0	4	119	98	+21	13	10	0	1	3	8
6	Italy	5	0	0	5	44	178	−134	6	24	0	0	0	0

Source: ESPN

Table ranking rules

- Four points are awarded for a win.
- Two points are awarded for a draw.
- A bonus point is awarded to a team that scores four or more tries in a match or loses a match by seven points or fewer. If a team scores four tries in a match and loses by seven points or fewer, they are awarded both bonus points.
- Three bonus points are awarded to a team that wins all five of their matches (a Grand Slam). This ensures that a Grand Slam winning team will always top the table with a minimum of 23 points. A team that loses a single match could only achieve a maximum of 22 points – they could win four matches with four try bonus points and lose the remaining match but still win two bonus points while losing that game.
- Tiebreakers:
  - If two or more teams are tied on table points, the team with the better match points difference (points scored less points conceded) is ranked higher.
  - If the above tiebreaker fails to separate tied teams, the team that scores the higher number of total tries in its matches is ranked higher.
  - If two or more teams remain tied for first place at the end of the championship after applying the above tiebreakers, the title will be shared between them.

== Fixtures ==
The fixtures were announced on 20 March 2019. For the first time since 2013, no matches were scheduled on a Friday night. The final match of the tournament also returned to peak time for the first time since 2016.

=== Round 1 ===
1 February 2020
14:15 GMT (UTC+0)

(1 BP) Wales	42–0	Italy
Try: Adams (3) 18' m, 30' c, 80+2' c Tompkins 59' c North 76' c Con: Biggar (2/3) 31', 61'; Halfpenny (2/2) 77', 80+4'; Pen: Biggar (3/3) 4', 11', 16'	Report; Match data

Millennium Stadium, Cardiff
Attendance: 68,582
Referee: Luke Pearce (England)

FB	15	Leigh Halfpenny
RW	14	Johnny McNicholl	11' to 22'
OC	13	George North
IC	12	Hadleigh Parkes			(substituted off) 53'
LW	11	Josh Adams
FH	10	Dan Biggar	(substituted off) 69'
SH	9	Tomos Williams	(substituted off) 61'
N8	8	Taulupe Faletau	(substituted off) 53'
OF	7	Justin Tipuric
BF	6	Aaron Wainwright
RL	5	Alun Wyn Jones (c)
LL	4	Jake Ball	(substituted off) 56'
TP	3	Dillon Lewis	(substituted off) 61'
HK	2	Ken Owens	(substituted off) 64'
LP	1	Wyn Jones	(substituted off) 56'
Replacements:
HK	16	Ryan Elias	(substituted on) 64'
PR	17	Rob Evans	(substituted on) 56'
PR	18	Leon Brown	(substituted on) 61'
LK	19	Cory Hill	(substituted on) 56'
N8	20	Ross Moriarty	(substituted on) 53'
SH	21	Rhys Webb	(substituted on) 61'
FH	22	Jarrod Evans	(substituted on) 69'
CE	23	Nick Tompkins	(substituted on) 11'	(substituted off) 22'	(substituted on) 53'
Coach:
Wayne Pivac

FB	15	Matteo Minozzi
RW	14	Leonardo Sarto	(substituted off) 56'
OC	13	Luca Morisi
IC	12	Carlo Canna
LW	11	Mattia Bellini
FH	10	Tommaso Allan
SH	9	Callum Braley	(substituted off) 71'
N8	8	Braam Steyn
OF	7	Sebastian Negri	(substituted off) 56'
BF	6	Jake Polledri
RL	5	Niccolò Cannone	(substituted off) 71'
LL	4	Alessandro Zanni	(substituted off) 47'
TP	3	Giosuè Zilocchi	(substituted off) 47'
HK	2	Luca Bigi (c)	(substituted off) 69'
LP	1	Andrea Lovotti	(substituted off) 47'
Replacements:
HK	16	Federico Zani	(substituted on) 69'
PR	17	Danilo Fischetti	(substituted on) 47'
PR	18	Marco Riccioni	(substituted on) 47'
LK	19	Marco Lazzaroni	(substituted on) 47'
LK	20	Dean Budd	(substituted on) 71'
FL	21	Giovanni Licata	(substituted on) 56'
SH	22	Guglielmo Palazzani	(substituted on) 71'
FB	23	Jayden Hayward	(substituted on) 56'
Coach:
Franco Smith

Player of the Match:
Justin Tipuric (Wales)

Touch judges:
Matthew Carley (England)
Mike Fraser (New Zealand)
Television match official:
James Leckie (Australia)

Notes:

- Johnny McNicholl and Nick Tompkins (both Wales) and Niccolò Cannone and Danilo Fischetti (both Italy) made their international debuts.
- Josh Adams became the second Welsh player to score a hat-trick in the Six Nations after George North scored three times against Italy in 2015.
- Italy were held to zero points for the first time since losing 29–0 to Scotland in 2017.

1 February 2020
16:45 GMT (UTC+0)

Ireland	19–12	Scotland (1 BP)
Try: Sexton 10' c Con: Sexton (1/1) 12'; Pen: Sexton (4/5) 35', 45', 57', 73'	Report; Match data	Pen: Hastings (4/5) 5', 16', 52', 66'

Aviva Stadium, Dublin
Attendance: 51,000
Referee: Mathieu Raynal (France)

FB	15	Jordan Larmour
RW	14	Andrew Conway
OC	13	Garry Ringrose	(substituted off) 41'
IC	12	Bundee Aki
LW	11	Jacob Stockdale
FH	10	Johnny Sexton (c)	(substituted off) 73'
SH	9	Conor Murray	(substituted off) 61'
N8	8	Caelan Doris	(substituted off) 5'
OF	7	Josh van der Flier
BF	6	CJ Stander
RL	5	James Ryan
LL	4	Iain Henderson	(substituted off) 67'
TP	3	Tadhg Furlong				(substituted off) 78'
HK	2	Rob Herring	(substituted off) 73'
LP	1	Cian Healy	(substituted off) 50'	(substituted on) 51'	(substituted off) 66'	(substituted on) 78'
Replacements:
HK	16	Rónan Kelleher	(substituted on) 73'
PR	17	Dave Kilcoyne	(substituted on) 50'	(substituted off) 51'
PR	18	Andrew Porter			(substituted on) 66'
LK	19	Devin Toner	(substituted on) 67'
FL	20	Peter O'Mahony	(substituted on) 5'
SH	21	John Cooney	(substituted on) 61'
FH	22	Ross Byrne	(substituted on) 73'
CE	23	Robbie Henshaw	(substituted on) 41'
Coach:
Andy Farrell

FB	15	Stuart Hogg (c)
RW	14	Sean Maitland
OC	13	Huw Jones	(substituted off) 65'
IC	12	Sam Johnson	(substituted off) 73'
LW	11	Blair Kinghorn
FH	10	Adam Hastings
SH	9	Ali Price	(substituted off) 65'
N8	8	Nick Haining	(substituted off) 73'
OF	7	Hamish Watson
BF	6	Jamie Ritchie
RL	5	Jonny Gray	(substituted off) 65'
LL	4	Scott Cummings
TP	3	Zander Fagerson	(substituted off) 73'
HK	2	Fraser Brown	47' to 51'		(substituted off) 57'
LP	1	Rory Sutherland	(substituted off) 65'
Replacements:
HK	16	Stuart McInally	(substituted on) 47'	(substituted off) 51'	(substituted on) 57'
PR	17	Allan Dell	(substituted on) 65'
PR	18	W. P. Nel	(substituted on) 73'
LK	19	Ben Toolis	(substituted on) 65'
N8	20	Cornell du Preez	(substituted on) 73'
SH	21	George Horne	(substituted on) 65'
CE	22	Rory Hutchinson	(substituted on) 73'
CE	23	Chris Harris	(substituted on) 65'
Coach:
Gregor Townsend

Player of the Match:
CJ Stander (Ireland)

Touch judges:
Pascal Gaüzère (France)
Federico Anselmi (Argentina)
Television match official:
Glenn Newman (New Zealand)

Notes:

- Caelan Doris and Rónan Kelleher (both Ireland), and Nick Haining (Scotland) made their international debuts.
- Simon Berghan (Scotland) was originally named as a replacement, but he was replaced on the day of the game by WP Nel.
- Ireland retained the Centenary Quaich.

2 February 2020
16:00 CET (UTC+1)

France	24–17	England (1 BP)
Try: Rattez 6' c Ollivon (2) 20' c, 55' c Con: Ntamack (3/3) 7', 21', 56'; Pen: Ntamack (1/1) 16'	Report; Match data	Try: May (2) 57' c, 65' c Con: Farrell (2/2) 58', 65'; Pen: Farrell (1/1) 80+2'

Stade de France, Saint-Denis
Attendance: 79,310
Referee: Nigel Owens (Wales)

FB	15	Anthony Bouthier
RW	14	Teddy Thomas
OC	13	Virimi Vakatawa	(substituted off) 80'
IC	12	Gaël Fickou
LW	11	Vincent Rattez
FH	10	Romain Ntamack	(substituted off) 77'
SH	9	Antoine Dupont
N8	8	Grégory Alldritt
OF	7	Charles Ollivon (c)
BF	6	François Cros	(substituted off) 57'
RL	5	Paul Willemse	(substituted off) 57'
LL	4	Bernard Le Roux
TP	3	Mohamed Haouas	(substituted off) 49'
HK	2	Julien Marchand	(substituted off) 67'
LP	1	Cyril Baille	(substituted off) 49'
Replacements:
HK	16	Peato Mauvaka	(substituted on) 67'
PR	17	Jefferson Poirot	(substituted on) 49'
PR	18	Demba Bamba	(substituted on) 49'
LK	19	Boris Palu	(substituted on) 57'
FL	20	Cameron Woki	(substituted on) 57'
SH	21	Baptiste Serin
FH	22	Matthieu Jalibert	(substituted on) 77'
CE	23	Arthur Vincent	(substituted on) 80'
Coach:
Fabien Galthié

FB	15	George Furbank
RW	14	Jonny May
OC	13	Manu Tuilagi	(substituted off) 16'
IC	12	Owen Farrell (c)
LW	11	Elliot Daly
FH	10	George Ford	(substituted off) 76'
SH	9	Ben Youngs	(substituted off) 62'
N8	8	Tom Curry
OF	7	Sam Underhill
BF	6	Courtney Lawes	(substituted off) 55'
RL	5	Charlie Ewels	(substituted off) 56'
LL	4	Maro Itoje
TP	3	Kyle Sinckler	(substituted off) 73'
HK	2	Jamie George	(substituted off) 49'
LP	1	Joe Marler	(substituted off) 52'
Replacements:
HK	16	Luke Cowan-Dickie	(substituted on) 49'
PR	17	Ellis Genge	(substituted on) 52'
PR	18	Will Stuart	(substituted on) 73'
LK	19	George Kruis	(substituted on) 56'
FL	20	Lewis Ludlam	(substituted on) 55'
SH	21	Willi Heinz	(substituted on) 62'
CE	22	Ollie Devoto	(substituted on) 76'
CE	23	Jonathan Joseph	(substituted on) 16'
Coach:
Eddie Jones

Player of the Match:
Grégory Alldritt (France)

Touch judges:
Andrew Brace (Ireland)
Brendon Pickerill (New Zealand)
Television match official:
Brian MacNeice (Ireland)

Notes:

- Anthony Bouthier, Mohamed Haouas, Boris Palu, Arthur Vincent and Cameron Woki (all France) and George Furbank and Will Stuart (both England) made their international debuts.
- Damian Penaud (France) was originally named in the starting line-up, but was ruled out with a calf injury. Vincent Rattez replaced him, while Arthur Vincent took Rattez's place on the bench.
- France won their opening Six Nations match for the first time since beating Italy 23–21 in 2016. England lost their opening Six Nations match for the first time since 2014, which was also a loss to France in Paris.
- England failed to score points in the first half for the first time in a Six Nations match since their 35–3 victory over Ireland in 1988.

=== Round 2 ===
8 February 2020
14:15 GMT (UTC+0)

(1 BP) Ireland	24–14	Wales
Try: Larmour 19' m Furlong 32' c Van der Flier 47' c Conway 75' m Con: Sexton (2/4) 33', 48'	Report; Match data	Try: T. Williams 27' c Tipuric 80+1' c Con: Biggar (1/1) 28'; Halfpenny (1/1) 80+2'

Aviva Stadium, Dublin
Attendance: 51,000
Referee: Romain Poite (France)

FB	15	Jordan Larmour
RW	14	Andrew Conway
OC	13	Robbie Henshaw		(substituted off) 45'
IC	12	Bundee Aki
LW	11	Jacob Stockdale
FH	10	Johnny Sexton (c)		(substituted off) 71'
SH	9	Conor Murray		(substituted off) 73'
N8	8	CJ Stander	(yellow card) 80'
OF	7	Josh van der Flier
BF	6	Peter O'Mahony		(substituted off) 71'
RL	5	James Ryan
LL	4	Iain Henderson		(substituted off) 67'
TP	3	Tadhg Furlong		(substituted off) 67'
HK	2	Rob Herring		(substituted off) 67'
LP	1	Cian Healy		(substituted off) 51'
Replacements:
HK	16	Rónan Kelleher		(substituted on) 67'
PR	17	Dave Kilcoyne		(substituted on) 51'
PR	18	Andrew Porter		(substituted on) 67'
LK	19	Devin Toner		(substituted on) 67'
FL	20	Max Deegan		(substituted on) 71'
SH	21	John Cooney		(substituted on) 73'
FH	22	Ross Byrne		(substituted on) 71'
WG	23	Keith Earls		(substituted on) 45'
Coach:
Andy Farrell

FB	15	Leigh Halfpenny
RW	14	George North
OC	13	Nick Tompkins
IC	12	Hadleigh Parkes
LW	11	Josh Adams	(substituted off) 25'
FH	10	Dan Biggar	(substituted off) 45'
SH	9	Tomos Williams	(substituted off) 49'
N8	8	Taulupe Faletau
OF	7	Justin Tipuric
BF	6	Aaron Wainwright	(substituted off) 49'
RL	5	Alun Wyn Jones (c)
LL	4	Jake Ball	(substituted off) 71'
TP	3	Dillon Lewis	(substituted off) 67'
HK	2	Ken Owens	(substituted off) 74'
LP	1	Wyn Jones	(substituted off) 64'
Replacements:
HK	16	Ryan Elias	(substituted on) 74'
PR	17	Rhys Carré	(substituted on) 64'
PR	18	Leon Brown	(substituted on) 67'
LK	19	Adam Beard	(substituted on) 71'
N8	20	Ross Moriarty	(substituted on) 49'
SH	21	Gareth Davies	(substituted on) 49'
FH	22	Jarrod Evans	(substituted on) 45'
WG	23	Johnny McNicholl	(substituted on) 25'
Coach:
Wayne Pivac

Player of the Match:
CJ Stander (Ireland)

Touch judges:
Luke Pearce (England)
Mike Fraser (New Zealand)
Television match official:
Glenn Newman (New Zealand)

Notes:

- Max Deegan (Ireland) made his international debut.
- Owen Williams was named on the bench for Wales but was replaced by Jarrod Evans due to a calf injury.

8 February 2020
16:45 GMT (UTC+0)

(1 BP) Scotland	6–13	England
Pen: Hastings (2/2) 46', 78'	Report; Match data	Try: Genge 70' c Con: Farrell (1/1) 71'; Pen: Farrell (2/5) 11', 77'

Murrayfield Stadium, Edinburgh
Attendance: 67,144
Referee: Pascal Gaüzère (France)

FB	15	Stuart Hogg (c)
RW	14	Sean Maitland
OC	13	Huw Jones	(substituted off) 56'
IC	12	Sam Johnson
LW	11	Blair Kinghorn
FH	10	Adam Hastings
SH	9	Ali Price
N8	8	Magnus Bradbury	(substituted off) 75'
OF	7	Hamish Watson
BF	6	Jamie Ritchie
RL	5	Jonny Gray
LL	4	Scott Cummings	(substituted off) 56'
TP	3	Zander Fagerson	(substituted off) 60'
HK	2	Fraser Brown	(substituted off) 52'
LP	1	Rory Sutherland	(substituted off) 60'
Replacements:
HK	16	Stuart McInally	(substituted on) 52'
PR	17	Allan Dell	(substituted on) 60'
PR	18	Simon Berghan	(substituted on) 60'
LK	19	Ben Toolis	(substituted on) 56'
N8	20	Nick Haining	(substituted on) 75'
SH	21	George Horne
CE	22	Rory Hutchinson
CE	23	Chris Harris	(substituted on) 56'
Coach:
Gregor Townsend

FB	15	George Furbank
RW	14	Jonny May
OC	13	Jonathan Joseph
IC	12	Owen Farrell (c)
LW	11	Elliot Daly
FH	10	George Ford
SH	9	Willi Heinz	(substituted off) 59'
N8	8	Tom Curry
OF	7	Sam Underhill	(substituted off) 66'
BF	6	Lewis Ludlam	(substituted off) 52'
RL	5	George Kruis	(substituted off) 71'
LL	4	Maro Itoje
TP	3	Kyle Sinckler
HK	2	Jamie George
LP	1	Mako Vunipola	(substituted off) 57'
Replacements:
HK	16	Tom Dunn
PR	17	Ellis Genge	(substituted on) 57'
PR	18	Will Stuart
LK	19	Joe Launchbury	(substituted on) 71'
LK	20	Courtney Lawes	(substituted on) 52'
FL	21	Ben Earl	(substituted on) 66'
SH	22	Ben Youngs	(substituted on) 59'
CE	23	Ollie Devoto
Coach:
Eddie Jones

Player of the Match:
Sam Underhill (England)

Touch judges:
Mathieu Raynal (France)
Federico Anselmi (Argentina)
Television match official:
James Leckie (Australia)

Notes:

- Ben Earl (England) made his international debut.
- England reclaimed the Calcutta Cup for the first time since 2017.

9 February 2020
16:00 CET (UTC+1)

(1 BP) France	35–22	Italy
Try: Thomas 7' m Ollivon 18' m Alldritt 39' c Ntamack 59' m Serin 74' c Con: Ntamack (1/4) 40'; Jalibert (1/1) 75'; Pen: Ntamack (2/3) 3', 32'	Report; Match data	Try: Minozzi 24' c Zani 65' c Bellini 80' m Con: Allan (2/2) 26', 66'; Pen: Allan (1/2) 29'

Stade de France, Saint-Denis
Attendance: 52,000
Referee: Andrew Brace (Ireland)

FB	15	Anthony Bouthier
RW	14	Teddy Thomas
OC	13	Arthur Vincent
IC	12	Gaël Fickou
LW	11	Vincent Rattez		(substituted off) 77'
FH	10	Romain Ntamack	(substituted off) 70'	(substituted on) 77'
SH	9	Antoine Dupont	(substituted off) 72'
N8	8	Grégory Alldritt
OF	7	Charles Ollivon (c)
BF	6	François Cros	(substituted off) 61'
RL	5	Paul Willemse	(substituted off) 44'
LL	4	Bernard Le Roux	(substituted off) 70'
TP	3	Mohamed Haouas	(substituted off) 58'
HK	2	Julien Marchand	(substituted off) 61'
LP	1	Cyril Baille	(substituted off) 58'
Replacements:
HK	16	Peato Mauvaka	(substituted on) 61'
PR	17	Jefferson Poirot	(substituted on) 58'
PR	18	Demba Bamba	(substituted on) 58'
LK	19	Romain Taofifénua	(substituted on) 44'
LK	20	Boris Palu	(substituted on) 70'
FL	21	Cameron Woki	(substituted on) 61'
SH	22	Baptiste Serin	(substituted on) 72'
FH	23	Matthieu Jalibert	(substituted on) 70'
Coach:
Fabien Galthié

FB	15	Jayden Hayward
RW	14	Mattia Bellini
OC	13	Luca Morisi
IC	12	Carlo Canna
LW	11	Matteo Minozzi
FH	10	Tommaso Allan	(substituted off) 75'
SH	9	Callum Braley	(substituted off) 61'
N8	8	Braam Steyn
OF	7	Jake Polledri	(substituted off) 61'
BF	6	Sebastian Negri	(substituted off) 52'
RL	5	Niccolò Cannone
LL	4	Dean Budd	(substituted off) 77'
TP	3	Giosuè Zilocchi	(substituted off) 52'
HK	2	Luca Bigi (c)	(substituted off) 61'
LP	1	Andrea Lovotti	(substituted off) 52'
Replacements:
HK	16	Federico Zani	(substituted on) 61'
PR	17	Danilo Fischetti	(substituted on) 52'
PR	18	Marco Riccioni	(substituted on) 52'
LK	19	Jimmy Tuivaiti	(substituted on) 61'
LK	20	Federico Ruzza	(substituted on) 77'
FL	21	Giovanni Licata	(substituted on) 52'
SH	22	Guglielmo Palazzani	(substituted on) 61'
CE	23	Giulio Bisegni	(substituted on) 75'
Coach:
Franco Smith

Player of the Match:
Grégory Alldritt (France)

Touch judges:
Nigel Owens (Wales)
Brendon Pickerill (New Zealand)
Television match official:
Brian MacNeice (Ireland)

Notes:

- Alessandro Zanni (Italy) was originally named in the starting line-up, but suffered an injury in the pre-match warm-up and replaced by Dean Budd. Budd's place on the bench was taken by Jimmy Tuivaiti.
- France retained the Giuseppe Garibaldi Trophy.

=== Round 3 ===
22 February 2020
15:15 CET (UTC+1)

Italy	0–17	Scotland
	Report; Match data	Try: Hogg 23' m Harris 47' m Hastings 79' c Con: Hastings (1/3) 80'

Stadio Olimpico, Rome
Attendance: 54,349
Referee: Ben O'Keeffe (New Zealand)

FB	15	Jayden Hayward
RW	14	Mattia Bellini			(substituted off) 74'	(substituted on) 80+1'
OC	13	Luca Morisi
IC	12	Carlo Canna
LW	11	Matteo Minozzi			(substituted off) 80'
FH	10	Tommaso Allan		(substituted off) 74'	(substituted on) 80'
SH	9	Callum Braley		(substituted off) 59'
N8	8	Braam Steyn
OF	7	Sebastian Negri		(substituted off) 44'
BF	6	Jake Polledri
RL	5	Niccolò Cannone		(substituted off) 68'
LL	4	Alessandro Zanni		(substituted off) 44'
TP	3	Giosuè Zilocchi		(substituted off) 31'	(substituted on) 54'
HK	2	Luca Bigi (c)		(substituted off) 60'	(substituted on) 74'	(substituted off) 80+1'
LP	1	Andrea Lovotti		(substituted off) 59'
Replacements:
HK	16	Federico Zani	(yellow card) 70'	(substituted on) 60'
PR	17	Danilo Fischetti		(substituted on) 59'
PR	18	Marco Riccioni		(substituted on) 31'	(substituted off) 54'
LK	19	Marco Lazzaroni		(substituted on) 68'
LK	20	Dean Budd		(substituted on) 44'
FL	21	Giovanni Licata		(substituted on) 44'
SH	22	Guglielmo Palazzani		(substituted on) 59'
CE	23	Giulio Bisegni		(substituted on) 74'
Coach:
Franco Smith

FB	15	Stuart Hogg (c)
RW	14	Sean Maitland	(substituted off) 68'
OC	13	Chris Harris	(substituted off) 60'
IC	12	Sam Johnson
LW	11	Blair Kinghorn
FH	10	Adam Hastings
SH	9	Ali Price	(substituted off) 55'
N8	8	Magnus Bradbury	(substituted off) 55'
OF	7	Hamish Watson
BF	6	Jamie Ritchie
RL	5	Scott Cummings	(substituted off) 68'
LL	4	Ben Toolis
TP	3	Zander Fagerson	(substituted off) 55'
HK	2	Stuart McInally	(substituted off) 60'
LP	1	Rory Sutherland	(substituted off) 55'
Replacements:
HK	16	Fraser Brown	(substituted on) 60'
PR	17	Allan Dell	(substituted on) 55'
PR	18	W. P. Nel	(substituted on) 55'
LK	19	Grant Gilchrist	(substituted on) 68'
FL	20	Matt Fagerson	(substituted on) 55'
SH	21	George Horne	(substituted on) 55'
CE	22	Rory Hutchinson	(substituted on) 60'
WG	23	Byron McGuigan	(substituted on) 68'
Coach:
Gregor Townsend

Player of the Match:
Hamish Watson (Scotland)

Touch judges:
Mathieu Raynal (France)
Ben Whitehouse (Wales)
Television match official:
Rowan Kitt (England)

22 February 2020
16:45 GMT (UTC+0)

(1 BP) Wales	23–27	France
Try: Lewis 48' c Biggar 75' c Con: Biggar (2/2) 49', 75'; Pen: Biggar (3/3) 4', 26', 35'	Report; Match data	Try: Bouthier 7' c Willemse 30' c Ntamack 52' c Con: Ntamack (3/3) 8', 31', 53'; Pen: Ntamack (2/2) 19', 63'

Millennium Stadium, Cardiff
Attendance: 73,931
Referee: Matthew Carley (England)

FB	15	Leigh Halfpenny
RW	14	George North	(substituted off) 11'
OC	13	Nick Tompkins
IC	12	Hadleigh Parkes
LW	11	Josh Adams	(substituted off) 70'
FH	10	Dan Biggar
SH	9	Gareth Davies	(substituted off) 56'
N8	8	Taulupe Faletau	(substituted off) 65'
OF	7	Justin Tipuric
BF	6	Ross Moriarty
RL	5	Alun Wyn Jones (c)
LL	4	Jake Ball	(substituted off) 66'
TP	3	Dillon Lewis	(substituted off) 70'
HK	2	Ken Owens	(substituted off) 73'
LP	1	Wyn Jones	(substituted off) 59'
Replacements:
HK	16	Ryan Elias	(substituted on) 73'
PR	17	Rob Evans	(substituted on) 59'
PR	18	Leon Brown	(substituted on) 70'
LK	19	Will Rowlands	(substituted on) 66'
FL	20	Aaron Wainwright	(substituted on) 65'
SH	21	Tomos Williams	(substituted on) 56'
FH	22	Jarrod Evans	(substituted on) 70'
WG	23	Johnny McNicholl	(substituted on) 11'
Coach:
Wayne Pivac

FB	15	Anthony Bouthier
RW	14	Teddy Thomas		(substituted off) 66'
OC	13	Virimi Vakatawa
IC	12	Arthur Vincent
LW	11	Gaël Fickou
FH	10	Romain Ntamack		(substituted off) 74'
SH	9	Antoine Dupont		(substituted off) 74'
N8	8	Gregory Alldritt	(yellow card) 40'
OF	7	Charles Ollivon (c)
BF	6	François Cros		(substituted off) 69'
RL	5	Paul Willemse
LL	4	Bernard Le Roux		(substituted off) 65'
TP	3	Mohamed Haouas	(yellow card) 69'	(substituted off) 79'
HK	2	Julien Marchand		(substituted off) 56'
LP	1	Cyril Baille		(substituted off) 41'
Replacements:
HK	16	Camille Chat		(substituted on) 56'
PR	17	Jean-Baptiste Gros		(substituted on) 41'
PR	18	Demba Bamba		(substituted on) 69'
LK	19	Romain Taofifénua		(substituted on) 65'
FL	20	Dylan Cretin		(substituted on) 79'
SH	21	Baptiste Serin		(substituted on) 75'
FH	22	Matthieu Jalibert		(substituted on) 66'
FB	23	Thomas Ramos		(substituted on) 75'
Coach:
Fabien Galthié

Player of the Match:
Romain Ntamack (France)

Touch judges:
Wayne Barnes (England)
Karl Dickson (England)
Television match official:
Graham Hughes (England)

Notes:

- Will Rowlands (Wales), Dylan Cretin and Jean-Baptiste Gros (both France) made their international debuts.
- This was France's first Six Nations win in Cardiff since 2010.

23 February 2020
15:00 GMT (UTC+0)

England	24–12	Ireland
Try: Ford 8' c Daly 25' c Cowan-Dickie 62' c Con: Farrell (3/3) 9', 25', 64'; Pen: Farrell (1/1) 40'	Report; Match data	Try: Henshaw 50' m Porter 80+2' c Con: Cooney (1/1) 80+3'

Twickenham Stadium, London
Attendance: 81,476
Referee: Jaco Peyper (South Africa)

FB	15	Elliot Daly
RW	14	Jonny May
OC	13	Manu Tuilagi	(substituted off) 74'
IC	12	Owen Farrell (c)
LW	11	Jonathan Joseph
FH	10	George Ford
SH	9	Ben Youngs	(substituted off) 58'
N8	8	Tom Curry	(substituted off) 66'
OF	7	Sam Underhill
BF	6	Courtney Lawes	(substituted off) 58'
RL	5	George Kruis	(substituted off) 60'
LL	4	Maro Itoje
TP	3	Kyle Sinckler	(substituted off) 69'
HK	2	Jamie George	(substituted off) 52'
LP	1	Joe Marler	(substituted off) 58'
Replacements:
HK	16	Luke Cowan-Dickie	(substituted on) 52'
PR	17	Ellis Genge	(substituted on) 58'
PR	18	Will Stuart	(substituted on) 69'
LK	19	Joe Launchbury	(substituted on) 60'
LK	20	Charlie Ewels	(substituted on) 58'
FL	21	Ben Earl	(substituted on) 66'
SH	22	Willi Heinz	(substituted on) 58'
CE	23	Henry Slade	(substituted on) 74'
Coach:
Eddie Jones

FB	15	Jordan Larmour	(substituted off) 64'
RW	14	Andrew Conway	(substituted off) 66'
OC	13	Robbie Henshaw
IC	12	Bundee Aki
LW	11	Jacob Stockdale
FH	10	Johnny Sexton (c)
SH	9	Conor Murray	(substituted off) 55'
N8	8	CJ Stander
OF	7	Josh van der Flier	(substituted off) 60'
BF	6	Peter O'Mahony
RL	5	James Ryan
LL	4	Devin Toner	(substituted off) 60'
TP	3	Tadhg Furlong	(substituted off) 58'
HK	2	Rob Herring	(substituted off) 60'
LP	1	Cian Healy	(substituted off) 26'
Replacements:
HK	16	Rónan Kelleher	(substituted on) 60'
PR	17	Dave Kilcoyne	(substituted on) 26'
PR	18	Andrew Porter	(substituted on) 58'
LK	19	Ultan Dillane	(substituted on) 60'
N8	20	Caelan Doris	(substituted on) 60'
SH	21	John Cooney	(substituted on) 55'
FH	22	Ross Byrne	(substituted on) 66'
WG	23	Keith Earls	(substituted on) 64'
Coach:
Andy Farrell

Player of the Match:
Courtney Lawes (England)

Touch judges:
Romain Poite (France)
Alexandre Ruiz (France)
Television match official:
Marius Jonker (South Africa)

Notes:

- Jonathan Joseph (England) earned his 50th test cap.
- England retained the Millennium Trophy.
- Iain Henderson was named as a lock for Ireland, but withdrew from the team for family reasons; he was replaced by Devin Toner, whose place on the bench was taken by Ultan Dillane.

=== Round 4 ===
7 March 2020
16:45 GMT (UTC+0)

England	33–30	Wales (1 BP)
Try: Watson 4' c Daly 32' c Tuilagi 61' c Con: Farrell (3/3) 6', 34', 62'; Pen: Farrell (3/3) 16', 39', 45'; Ford (1/1) 52'	Report; Match data	Try: Tipuric (2) 41' c, 80+1' c Biggar 78' c Con: Biggar (3/3) 42', 78', 80+1'; Pen: Halfpenny (2/2) 9', 21'; Biggar (1/1) 40+1'

Twickenham Stadium, London
Attendance: 81,522
Referee: Ben O'Keeffe (New Zealand)

FB	15	Elliot Daly
RW	14	Anthony Watson
OC	13	Manu Tuilagi	(red card) 75'
IC	12	Owen Farrell (c)
LW	11	Jonny May		(substituted off) 8'
FH	10	George Ford
SH	9	Ben Youngs		(substituted off) 70'
N8	8	Tom Curry
OF	7	Mark Wilson		(substituted off) 76'
BF	6	Courtney Lawes		(substituted off) 66'
RL	5	George Kruis		(substituted off) 58'
LL	4	Maro Itoje
TP	3	Kyle Sinckler		(substituted off) 77'
HK	2	Jamie George		(substituted off) 58'
LP	1	Joe Marler		(substituted off) 66'	(substituted on) 76'
Replacements:
HK	16	Luke Cowan-Dickie		(substituted on) 58'
PR	17	Ellis Genge	(yellow card) 73'	(substituted on) 66'
PR	18	Will Stuart		(substituted on) 77'
LK	19	Joe Launchbury		(substituted on) 58'
LK	20	Charlie Ewels		(substituted on) 66'	(substituted off) 76'
FL	21	Ben Earl		(substituted on) 76'
SH	22	Willi Heinz		(substituted on) 70'
CE	23	Henry Slade		(substituted on) 8'
Coach:
Eddie Jones

FB	15	Leigh Halfpenny
RW	14	George North
OC	13	Nick Tompkins
IC	12	Hadleigh Parkes
LW	11	Liam Williams	(substituted off) 66'
FH	10	Dan Biggar
SH	9	Tomos Williams	(substituted off) 46'
N8	8	Josh Navidi
OF	7	Justin Tipuric
BF	6	Ross Moriarty	(substituted off) 58'
RL	5	Alun Wyn Jones (c)
LL	4	Jake Ball	(substituted off) 58'
TP	3	Dillon Lewis	(substituted off) 41'
HK	2	Ken Owens	(substituted off) 75'
LP	1	Rob Evans	(substituted off) 58'
Replacements:
HK	16	Ryan Elias	(substituted on) 75'
PR	17	Rhys Carré	(substituted on) 58'
PR	18	Leon Brown	(substituted on) 41'
FL	19	Aaron Shingler	(substituted on) 58'
N8	20	Taulupe Faletau	(substituted on) 58'
SH	21	Rhys Webb	(substituted on) 46'
FH	22	Jarrod Evans
WG	23	Johnny McNicholl	(substituted on) 66'
Coach:
Wayne Pivac

Player of the Match:
Ben Youngs (England)

Touch judges:
Romain Poite (France)
Alexandre Ruiz (France)
Television match official:
Marius Jonker (South Africa)

Notes:

- England secured their 26th Triple Crown, their first since 2016.
- Manu Tuilagi became the first England player to be sent off since Elliot Daly was dismissed against Argentina in 2016. It was also the first red card in a Six Nations match since Stuart Hogg was sent off for Scotland against Wales in 2014.
- Alun Wyn Jones made a record 57th Six Nations appearance for Wales.

8 March 2020
15:00 GMT (UTC+0)

Scotland	28–17	France
Try: Maitland (2) 40+1' m, 45' c McInally 64' c Con: Hastings (2/3) 46', 66'; Pen: Hastings (3/3) 11', 19', 37'	Report; Match data	Try: Penaud 33' c Ollivon 76' c Con: Jalibert (2/2) 34', 76'; Pen: Jalibert (1/1) 61'

Murrayfield Stadium, Edinburgh
Attendance: 67,144
Referee: Paul Williams (New Zealand)

FB	15	Stuart Hogg (c)
RW	14	Sean Maitland	(substituted off) 67'
OC	13	Chris Harris
IC	12	Sam Johnson	(substituted off) 79'
LW	11	Blair Kinghorn
FH	10	Adam Hastings
SH	9	Ali Price	(substituted off) 59'
N8	8	Nick Haining	(substituted off) 59'
OF	7	Hamish Watson
BF	6	Jamie Ritchie
RL	5	Grant Gilchrist
LL	4	Scott Cummings	(substituted off) 71'
TP	3	Zander Fagerson	(substituted off) 67'
HK	2	Fraser Brown	(substituted off) 59'
LP	1	Rory Sutherland	(substituted off) 59'
Replacements:
HK	16	Stuart McInally	(substituted on) 59'
PR	17	Allan Dell	(substituted on) 59'
PR	18	W. P. Nel	(substituted on) 67'
LK	19	Sam Skinner	(substituted on) 71'
N8	20	Magnus Bradbury	(substituted on) 59'
SH	21	George Horne	(substituted on) 59'
FH	22	Duncan Weir	(substituted on) 79'
WG	23	Kyle Steyn	(substituted on) 67'
Coach:
Gregor Townsend

FB	15	Anthony Bouthier		(substituted off) 71'
RW	14	Damian Penaud		(substituted off) 59'
OC	13	Virimi Vakatawa
IC	12	Arthur Vincent
LW	11	Gaël Fickou
FH	10	Romain Ntamack		(substituted off) 8'
SH	9	Antoine Dupont		(substituted off) 77'
N8	8	Gregory Alldritt
OF	7	Charles Ollivon (c)
BF	6	François Cros	(yellow card) 5'	(substituted off) 48'
RL	5	Paul Willemse		(substituted off) 48'
LL	4	Bernard Le Roux
TP	3	Mohamed Haouas	(red card) 37'
HK	2	Julien Marchand		(substituted off) 64'
LP	1	Jefferson Poirot		(substituted off) 51'
Replacements:
HK	16	Peato Mauvaka		(substituted on) 64'
PR	17	Jean-Baptiste Gros		(substituted on) 51'
PR	18	Demba Bamba		(substituted on) 48'
LK	19	Romain Taofifénua		(substituted on) 48'
FL	20	Dylan Cretin		(substituted on) 59'
SH	21	Baptiste Serin		(substituted on) 77'
FH	22	Matthieu Jalibert		(substituted on) 8'
FB	23	Thomas Ramos		(substituted on) 71'
Coach:
Fabien Galthié

Player of the Match:
Jamie Ritchie (Scotland)

Touch judges:
Wayne Barnes (England)
Frank Murphy (Ireland)
Television match official:
Brian MacNeice (Ireland)

Notes:

- Kyle Steyn (Scotland) made his international debut.
- Fraser Brown (Scotland) earned his 50th test cap.
- With France's defeat, no team could win the Grand Slam.
- Scotland reclaimed the Auld Alliance Trophy.
- This was Scotland's 200th win in the Six Nations, including Home Nations and Five Nations tournaments.
- Scotland won back-to-back matches against France, after also defeating them in August 2019, for the first time since 1964.
- Camille Chat was named on the bench for France as hooker, but withdrew in the warm-up ahead of the game due to a hamstring injury, with Peato Mauvaka replacing him.

24 October 2020 (Note: Initially scheduled for 7 March 2020.)
15:30 IST (UTC+01)

(1 BP) Ireland	50–17	Italy
Try: Stander 8' c Keenan (2) 30' c, 36' c Connors 61' c Sexton 65' m Aki 69' c Heffernan 80' c Con: Sexton (5/6) 9', 31', 38', 63', 71'; R. Byrne (1/1) 80'; Pen: Sexton (1/1) 14'	Report; Match data	Try: Padovani 55' c Garbisi 80+2' c Con: Garbisi (2/2) 56', 80+3'; Pen: Garbisi (1/2) 4'

Aviva Stadium, Dublin
Attendance: 0
Referee: Matthew Carley (England) (Note: Nic Berry was initially appointed as referee, but travel restrictions meant the match was reassigned to Matthew Carley.)

FB	15	Jacob Stockdale
RW	14	Andrew Conway
OC	13	Garry Ringrose		(substituted off) 27'
IC	12	Bundee Aki
LW	11	Hugo Keenan
FH	10	Johnny Sexton (c)		(substituted off) 71'
SH	9	Conor Murray	(yellow card) 3'	(substituted off) 67'
N8	8	CJ Stander
OF	7	Will Connors
BF	6	Caelan Doris		(substituted off) 67'
RL	5	James Ryan		(substituted off) 63'
LL	4	Tadhg Beirne
TP	3	Andrew Porter		(substituted off) 63'
HK	2	Rob Herring		(substituted off) 51'
LP	1	Cian Healy		(substituted off) 56'
Replacements:
HK	16	Dave Heffernan		(substituted on) 51'
PR	17	Ed Byrne		(substituted on) 56'
PR	18	Finlay Bealham		(substituted on) 63'
LK	19	Ultan Dillane		(substituted on) 63'
FL	20	Peter O'Mahony		(substituted on) 67'
SH	21	Jamison Gibson-Park		(substituted on) 67'
FH	22	Ross Byrne		(substituted on) 71'
CE	23	Robbie Henshaw		(substituted on) 27'
Coach:
Andy Farrell

FB	15	Jayden Hayward
RW	14	Edoardo Padovani
OC	13	Luca Morisi	(substituted off) 54'
IC	12	Carlo Canna
LW	11	Mattia Bellini
FH	10	Paolo Garbisi
SH	9	Marcello Violi	(substituted off) 72'
N8	8	Jake Polledri
OF	7	Braam Steyn
BF	6	Sebastian Negri	(substituted off) 67'
RL	5	Niccolò Cannone	(substituted off) 47'
LL	4	Marco Lazzaroni	(substituted off) 63'
TP	3	Giosuè Zilocchi	(substituted off) 47'
HK	2	Luca Bigi (c)	(substituted off) 47'
LP	1	Danilo Fischetti	(substituted off) 47'
Replacements:
HK	16	Gianmarco Lucchesi	(substituted on) 47'
PR	17	Simone Ferrari	(substituted on) 47'
PR	18	Pietro Ceccarelli	(substituted on) 47'
FL	19	David Sisi	(substituted on) 47'
N8	20	Johan Meyer	(substituted on) 63'
FL	21	Maxime Mbanda	(substituted on) 67'
SH	22	Callum Braley	(substituted on) 72'
CE	23	Federico Mori	(substituted on) 54'
Coach:
Franco Smith

Player of the Match:
Will Connors (Ireland)

Touch judges:
Luke Pearce (England)
Christophe Ridley (England)
Television match official:
Tom Foley (England)

Note:

- Ed Byrne, Will Connors, Jamison Gibson-Park, Hugo Keenan (all Ireland), Gianmarco Lucchesi, Paolo Garbisi and Federico Mori (all Italy) made their international debuts.
- This result meant Italy won the Wooden Spoon for the fifth consecutive year, and their 15th since joining the Six Nations.

=== Round 5 ===
31 October 2020 (Note: This game was originally due to go ahead on 14 March, and teams had been announced, but it was postponed on 13 March.)
14:15 GMT (UTC+0)

(1 BP) Wales	10–14	Scotland
Try: Carré 31' c Con: Biggar (1/1) 32'; Pen: Halfpenny (1/1) 66'	Report; Match data	Try: McInally 61' m Pen: Russell (1/2) 10'; Hastings (1/1) 40'; Hogg (1/1) 80'

Parc y Scarlets, Llanelli
Attendance: 0
Referee: Andrew Brace (Ireland) (Note: Angus Gardner was initially appointed as referee, but travel restrictions meant the match was reassigned to Andrew Brace.)

FB	15	Leigh Halfpenny
RW	14	Liam Williams
OC	13	Jonathan Davies
IC	12	Owen Watkin	(substituted off) 74'
LW	11	Josh Adams
FH	10	Dan Biggar	(substituted off) 43'
SH	9	Gareth Davies	(substituted off) 72'
N8	8	Taulupe Faletau	(substituted off) 70'
OF	7	James Davies
BF	6	Shane Lewis-Hughes
RL	5	Alun Wyn Jones (c)
LL	4	Will Rowlands	(substituted off) 57'
TP	3	Tomas Francis	(substituted off) 57'	(substituted on) 73'
HK	2	Ryan Elias	(substituted off) 70'
LP	1	Rhys Carré	(substituted off) 49'
Replacements:
HK	16	Sam Parry	(substituted on) 70'
PR	17	Wyn Jones	(substituted on) 49'
PR	18	Dillon Lewis	(substituted on) 57'	(substituted off) 73'
LK	19	Cory Hill	(substituted on) 57'
FL	20	Aaron Wainwright	(substituted on) 70'
SH	21	Lloyd Williams	(substituted on) 72'
FH	22	Rhys Patchell	(substituted on) 43'
CE	23	Nick Tompkins	(substituted on) 74'
Coach:
Wayne Pivac

FB	15	Stuart Hogg (c)
RW	14	Darcy Graham	(substituted off) 66'
OC	13	Chris Harris
IC	12	James Lang
LW	11	Blair Kinghorn
FH	10	Finn Russell	(substituted off) 32'
SH	9	Ali Price
N8	8	Blade Thomson	(substituted off) 54'
OF	7	Hamish Watson
BF	6	Jamie Ritchie
RL	5	Jonny Gray
LL	4	Scott Cummings
TP	3	Zander Fagerson	(substituted off) 54'
HK	2	Fraser Brown	(substituted off) 54'
LP	1	Rory Sutherland	(substituted off) 54'
Replacements:
HK	16	Stuart McInally	(substituted on) 54'
PR	17	Oli Kebble	(substituted on) 54'
PR	18	Simon Berghan	(substituted on) 54'
LK	19	Ben Toolis
N8	20	Cornell du Preez	(substituted on) 54'
SH	21	Scott Steele		(substituted on) 70'
FH	22	Adam Hastings	(substituted on) 32'	(substituted off) 70'
WG	23	Duhan van der Merwe	(substituted on) 66'
Coach:
(Scotland) Gregor Townsend

Player of the Match:
Jamie Ritchie (Scotland)

Touch judges:
Mathieu Raynal (France)
Christophe Ridley (England)
Television match official:
Tom Foley (England)

Notes:

- Wales made 19 changes to the team that was selected for the original fixture on 14 March, while Scotland made 15 changes.
- Justin Tipuric was named in the starting XV at openside flanker, but was ruled out ahead of kick-off. James Davies replaced him in the starting team with Aaron Wainwright joining the replacements.
- Alun Wyn Jones (Wales) earned his 149th international cap (140 for Wales, 9 for the British and Irish Lions) to surpass New Zealand's Richie McCaw's record as the most capped international rugby player.
- Shane Lewis-Hughes (Wales) and Scott Steele (Scotland) made their international debuts.
- Scotland won three consecutive Six Nations matches for the first time since 1996.
- This was Scotland's first win in Wales since 2002.
- Wales finished in fifth place with one win, their worst performance since 2007.
- Wales played a home game away from the Millennium Stadium for the first time since playing Romania at the Racecourse Ground in Wrexham in 2003. It was also the first Welsh international played in Llanelli since 1998 and the first Six Nations game in Llanelli since 1893, making this the first international match played at Parc y Scarlets.
- Scotland won the Doddie Weir Cup for the first time.

31 October 2020 (Note: Due to the coronavirus outbreak in Italy, this game was first arranged to be played behind closed doors on 14 March, but was postponed the following day, and ultimately rescheduled for 31 October.)
17:45 CET (UTC+01)

Italy	5–34	England (1 BP)
Try: Polledri 18' m	Report; Match data	Try: Youngs (2) 5' c, 41' c George 51' c Curry 67' m Slade 72' m Con: Farrell (3/5) 6', 42', 52'; Pen: Farrell (1/1) 13'

Stadio Olimpico, Rome
Attendance: 0
Referee: Pascal Gaüzère (France)

FB	15	Matteo Minozzi		(substituted off) 47'
RW	14	Edoardo Padovani		(substituted off) 22'
OC	13	Luca Morisi
IC	12	Carlo Canna
LW	11	Mattia Bellini
FH	10	Paolo Garbisi
SH	9	Marcello Violi
N8	8	Jake Polledri	(yellow card) 38'
OF	7	Braam Steyn
BF	6	Sebastian Negri		(substituted off) 73'
RL	5	Niccolò Cannone		(substituted off) 61'
LL	4	Marco Lazzaroni		(substituted off) 78'
TP	3	Giosuè Zilocchi		(substituted off) 61'
HK	2	Luca Bigi (c)		(substituted off) 61'
LP	1	Danilo Fischetti		(substituted off) 42'	(substituted on) 52'	(substituted off) 61'
Replacements:
HK	16	Gianmarco Lucchesi		(substituted on) 61'
PR	17	Simone Ferrari		(substituted on) 42'	(substituted off) 52'	(substituted on) 61'
PR	18	Pietro Ceccarelli		(substituted on) 61'
FL	19	David Sisi		(substituted on) 61'
N8	20	Johan Meyer		(substituted on) 78'
FL	21	Maxime Mbanda		(substituted on) 73'
SH	22	Guglielmo Palazzani		(substituted on) 47'
CE	23	Federico Mori		(substituted on) 22'
Coach:
Franco Smith

FB	15	George Furbank
RW	14	Anthony Watson		(substituted off) 54'
OC	13	Jonathan Joseph		(substituted off) 68'
IC	12	Henry Slade
LW	11	Jonny May
FH	10	Owen Farrell (c)
SH	9	Ben Youngs		(substituted off) 73'
N8	8	Billy Vunipola
OF	7	Sam Underhill		33' to 41'		(substituted off) 54'
BF	6	Tom Curry
RL	5	Jonny Hill	(yellow card) 22'	(substituted off) 68'
LL	4	Maro Itoje
TP	3	Kyle Sinckler		(substituted off) 63'
HK	2	Jamie George		(substituted off) 79'
LP	1	Mako Vunipola		(substituted off) 59'
Replacements:
HK	16	Tom Dunn		(substituted on) 79'
PR	17	Ellis Genge		(substituted on) 59'
PR	18	Will Stuart		(substituted on) 63'
LK	19	Charlie Ewels		(substituted on) 68'
FL	20	Ben Earl		(substituted on) 36'	(substituted off) 40'	(substituted on) 54'
SH	21	Dan Robson		(substituted on) 73'
CE	22	Ollie Lawrence		(substituted on) 68'
WG	23	Ollie Thorley		(substituted on) 54'
Coach:
Eddie Jones

Player of the Match:
Ben Youngs (England)

Touch judges:
Alexandre Ruiz (France)
Mike Adamson (Scotland)
Television match official:
Romain Poite (France)

Notes:

- Ben Youngs became the second England player after Jason Leonard to earn his 100th test cap.
- Jamie George (England) earned his 50th test cap.
- Tom Dunn, Jonny Hill, Ollie Lawrence and Ollie Thorley (all England) made their international debuts.
- Italy were whitewashed for the fifth consecutive year.

31 October 2020 (Note: The match between France and Ireland, initially scheduled for 14 March, was postponed on 9 March due to concerns over the coronavirus outbreak.)
21:10 CET (UTC+01)

(1 BP) France	35–27	Ireland
Try: Dupont 7' c Penalty try 30'; Ntamack 44' m Vakatawa 71' c Con: Ntamack (2/3) 8', 72'; Pen: Ntamack (3/3) 38', 48', 52'	Report; Match data	Try: Healy 19' c Henshaw 60' c Stockdale 80' c Con: Sexton (2/2) 19', 61'; R. Byrne (1/1) 80+1'; Pen: Sexton (2/2) 26', 33'

Stade de France, Saint-Denis
Attendance: 0
Referee: Wayne Barnes (England)

FB	15	Anthony Bouthier	(yellow card) 10'	(substituted off) 73'
RW	14	Vincent Rattez
OC	13	Virimi Vakatawa		(substituted off) 73'
IC	12	Arthur Vincent
LW	11	Gaël Fickou
FH	10	Romain Ntamack
SH	9	Antoine Dupont		(substituted off) 77'
N8	8	Gregory Alldritt
OF	7	Charles Ollivon (c)
BF	6	François Cros		(substituted off) 34'
RL	5	Paul Willemse		(substituted off) 73'
LL	4	Bernard Le Roux
TP	3	Mohamed Haouas		(substituted off) 58'
HK	2	Julien Marchand		(substituted off) 56'
LP	1	Cyril Baille		(substituted off) 56'
Replacements:
HK	16	Camille Chat		(substituted on) 56'
PR	17	Jean-Baptiste Gros		(substituted on) 58'
PR	18	Demba Bamba		(substituted on) 56'
LK	19	Romain Taofifénua		(substituted on) 73'
FL	20	Dylan Cretin		(substituted on) 34'
SH	21	Baptiste Serin		(substituted on) 77'
WG	22	Arthur Retière		(substituted on) 73'
FB	23	Thomas Ramos		(substituted on) 73'
Coach:
Fabien Galthié

FB	15	Jacob Stockdale
RW	14	Andrew Conway
OC	13	Robbie Henshaw
IC	12	Bundee Aki		(substituted off) 53'
LW	11	Hugo Keenan
FH	10	Johnny Sexton (c)		(substituted off) 69'
SH	9	Conor Murray		(substituted off) 66'
N8	8	CJ Stander
OF	7	Will Connors		(substituted off) 54'
BF	6	Caelan Doris	(yellow card) 29'
RL	5	James Ryan
LL	4	Tadhg Beirne		(substituted off) 61'
TP	3	Andrew Porter		(substituted off) 69'
HK	2	Rob Herring		(substituted off) 58'
LP	1	Cian Healy		(substituted off) 26'	(substituted on) 38'	(substituted off) 61'
Replacements:
HK	16	Dave Heffernan		(substituted on) 58'
PR	17	Ed Byrne		(substituted on) 26'	(substituted off) 38'	(substituted on) 61'
PR	18	Finlay Bealham		(substituted on) 69'
LK	19	Ultan Dillane		(substituted on) 61'
FL	20	Peter O'Mahony		(substituted on) 54'
SH	21	Jamison Gibson-Park		(substituted on) 66'
FH	22	Ross Byrne		(substituted on) 69'
CE	23	Chris Farrell		(substituted on) 53'
Coach:
Andy Farrell

Player of the Match:
Gregory Alldritt (France)

Touch judges:
Matthew Carley (England)
Karl Dickson (England)
Television match official:
Luke Pearce (England)

Notes:

- Arthur Retière (France) made his international debut.
- Cian Healy became the sixth Ireland player to earn his 100th test cap.
- France required a win by 28 points to win the championship, while Ireland needed a bonus-point win or a margin of seven points (or six if they scored at least one try). As neither side met their requirements, England won a record 29th outright title.

== Player statistics ==
=== Most points ===
Pos	Name	Team	Pts
1	Romain Ntamack	France	57
2	Johnny Sexton	Ireland	51
3	Dan Biggar	Wales	49
4	Owen Farrell	England	48
5	Adam Hastings	Scotland	41
6	Charles Ollivon	France	20
7	Josh Adams	Wales	15
7	Leigh Halfpenny	Wales	15
7	Justin Tipuric	Wales	15
10	Paolo Garbisi	Italy	12

=== Most tries ===
Pos	Name	Team	Tries
1	Charles Ollivon	France	4
2	Josh Adams	Wales	3
2	Romain Ntamack	France	3
2	Justin Tipuric	Wales	3
5	Dan Biggar	Wales	2
5	Elliot Daly	England	2
5	Robbie Henshaw	Ireland	2
5	Hugo Keenan	Ireland	2
5	Sean Maitland	Scotland	2
5	Stuart McInally	Scotland	2
5	Jonny May	England	2
5	Johnny Sexton	Ireland	2
5	Ben Youngs	England	2

== See also ==
- 2020 end-of-year rugby union internationals
- Autumn Nations Cup
