= Will Connors =

Ireland international rugby union player

- Born: 4 April 1996 (age 30) Donadea, County Kildare, Ireland
- Height: 1.95 m (6 ft 5 in)
- Weight: 100 kg (16 st; 220 lb)
- School: Clongowes Wood College
- University: University College Dublin

Rugby union career
- Position: Back-row
Amateur team(s)
Years	Team	Apps	(Points)
2015–	UCD		
Senior career
Years	Team	Apps	(Points)
2018–2026	Leinster	64	(15)
2026-	Connacht		
- Correct as of 24 June 2026
International career
Years	Team	Apps	(Points)
2016–2017	Ireland U20		
2020–	Ireland	9	(15)
- Correct as of 14 March 2021

Will Connors (born 4 April 1996) is an Irish rugby union player for URC and European Rugby Champions Cup side Leinster, and for the Ireland national rugby union team. He plays in the back-row, primarily as an flanker.

== Early life ==
Connors was born in Donadea, County Kildare and attended Clongowes Wood College, where he played on the school's Leinster Schools Rugby Senior Cup side. He had previously played for many years with North Kildare RFC minis and is now club ambassador for the North Kildare RFC Skylarks additional needs team.

== Leinster ==
Connors spent a year in the Leinster Rugby sub-academy after leaving school in 2015, before entering the academy in Summer 2016. He impressed in making his senior debut in the 2017–18 season and was promoted to the senior squad ahead of the 2018–19 season (after completing two of the usual three academy years). Connors performances earned him a spot on the 2019–20 Pro14 Dream Team.

== Ireland ==
Connors played for Ireland Under-20s in 2016. He has also featured for the Ireland 7s team.

Connors debuted for the Ireland national rugby union team on 24 October 2020 in a Six Nations fixture against Italy, where he scored a try and had a team-high 20 tackles, earning the man-of-the-match honor for his performance. In the 2021 Six Nations Connors scored another two tries against Italy.
