= Vincent Rattez =

French rugby union player (born 1992)

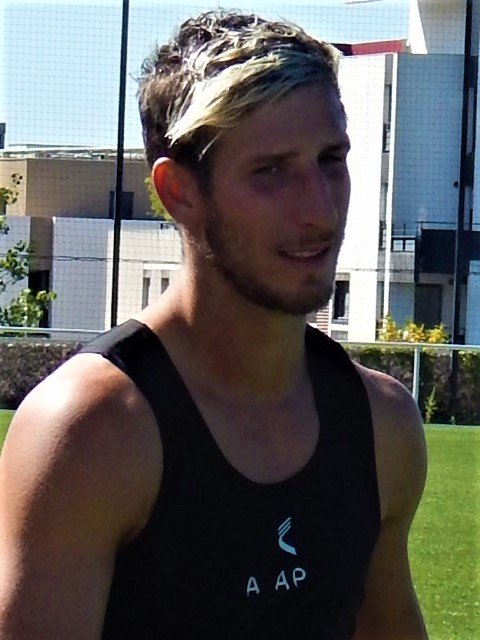
- Born: Vincent Rattez; 24 March 1992 (age 34) France
- Height: 1.81 m (5 ft 11 1/2 in)
- Weight: 78 kg (12 st 4 lb)

Rugby union career
- Position: Wing
- Current team: Lyon
Senior career
Years	Team	Apps	(Points)
2012–2016	Narbonne	93	(112)
2016–2020	La Rochelle	101	(135)
2020–2023	Montpellier	70	(60)
2023–	Lyon	39	(50)
- Correct as of 22 January 2025
International career
Years	Team	Apps	(Points)
2017–2020	France	8	(5)
- Correct as of 22 November 2020

Vincent Rattez (born 24 March 1992) is a French rugby union player who plays the regular position of wing and he currently plays for Lyon and the France national team.

== International career ==
Rattez was part of the French squad for the 2017 France rugby union tour of South Africa. He made his debut in the first test.

=== International tries ===
International tries
No.	Date	Venue	Opponent	Score	Result	Competition
1	2 February 2020	Stade de France, Saint-Denis, France	England	5–0	24–17	2020 Six Nations
