= Charles Ollivon =

French rugby union player (born 1993)

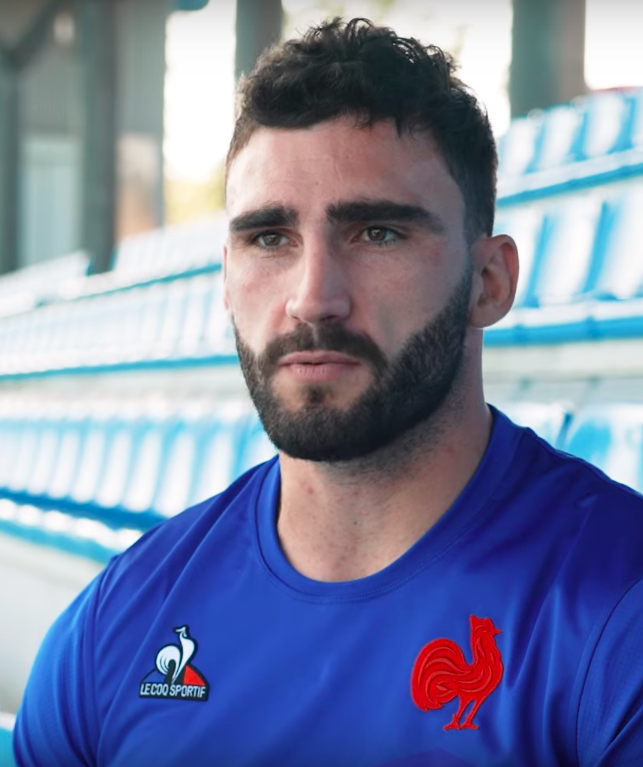
- Ollivon representing France
- Born: 11 May 1993 (age 33) Saint-Pée-sur-Nivelle, France
- Height: 1.99 m (6 ft 6 in)
- Weight: 114 kg (251 lb; 17 st 13 lb)

Rugby union career
- Position(s): Flanker, Number 8, Lock
- Current team: Toulon
Senior career
Years	Team	Apps	(Points)
2012–2015	Bayonne	33	(20)
2015–	Toulon	120	(75)
- Correct as of 31 October 2025
International career
Years	Team	Apps	(Points)
2014–	France	53	(95)
- Correct as of 14 March 2026

Charles Ollivon (born 11 May 1993) is a French professional rugby union player who plays as a flanker for Top 14 club Toulon and the France national team.

== Club career ==
Ollivon started his rugby career in the Academy Bayonne side at the age of 16, before being promoted to the main side in 2012 at the age of 19. During the 2012–13 Top 14 season, Charles made his professional debut against Bordeaux Bègles on 30 March 2013, coming off the bench. He could have played in more matches that season, but a shoulder injury required him to have surgery in April 2013. The following season, he played in 9 matches, making his run on debut on 4 September 2013 in a 55–0 defeat to Clermont. However, in January 2014 he suffered from another injury which saw him miss most of the season. He returned to the team in late March, but was brought slowly into the team, making several appearances off the bench. During the 2014–15 Top 14 season, he started in almost every match of the season, putting in regular good performances at the back of the pack (Number 8).

== International career ==
His strong ball carrying and break down work was recognized by French coach Philippe Saint-André, and therefore was named in his squad for the 2014 end-of-year rugby union internationals. He made his debut for France on 8 November 2014 against Fiji off the bench.

In January 2015 he was named in the France 31-man squad for the 2015 Six Nations Championship by coach Saint-André.

Ollivon made a comeback from a series of injuries in 2019, earning a spot in France's squad for the 2019 Rugby World Cup. He went on to start against Argentina and Tonga during the pool stages, also starting in the quarter-finals, against Wales. Ollivon scored a try against Wales, but France went on to lose 19-20 after a red card to Sebastien Vahaamahina.

Ollivon was announced as the new captain of the French men's national rugby team in January 2020 by coach Fabien Galthié, following the retirement of previous captain Guilhem Guirado. In his first game as captain, Charles scored 2 tries against England and led them to a 24-17 victory.

== Career statistics ==
=== List of international tries ===
International tries
No.	Date	Venue	Opponent	Score	Result	Competition
1	12 November 2016	Stadium de Toulouse, Toulouse, France	Samoa	16–3	52–8	2016 Autumn internationals
2	20 October 2019	Ōita Stadium, Ōita, Japan	Wales	10–0	19–20	2019 Rugby World Cup
3	2 February 2020	Stade de France, Saint-Denis, France	England	15–0	24–17	2020 Six Nations
4	2 February 2020	Stade de France, Saint-Denis, France	England	22–0	24–17	2020 Six Nations
5	9 February 2020	Stade de France, Saint-Denis, France	Italy	13–0	35–22	2020 Six Nations
6	8 March 2020	Murrayfield Stadium, Edinburgh, Scotland	Scotland	15–28	17–28	2020 Six Nations
7	24 October 2020	Stade de France, Saint-Denis, France	Wales	29–16	38–21	Test Match
8	14 February 2021	Aviva Stadium, Dublin, Ireland	Ireland	7–3	15–13	2021 Six Nations
9	20 March 2021	Stade de France, Saint-Denis, France	Wales	25–30	32–30	2021 Six Nations
10	20 November 2022	Stadium de Toulouse, Toulouse, France	Japan	19–3	35–17	2022 Autumn internationals
11	11 March 2023	Twickenham, London, England	England	3–25	10–53	2023 Six Nations
12	11 March 2023	Twickenham, London, England	England	10–39	10–53	2023 Six Nations
13	12 August 2023	Stade Geoffroy-Guichard, Saint-Étienne, France	Scotland	25–10	30–27	2023 Rugby World Cup warm-up matches
14	21 September 2023	Stade Vélodrome, Marseille, France	Namibia	17–0	96–0	2023 Rugby World Cup
15	21 September 2023	Stade Vélodrome, Marseille, France	Namibia	80–0	96–0	2023 Rugby World Cup
16	25 February 2024	Stade de France, Saint-Denis, France	Italy	5–0	13–13	2024 Six Nations
17	15 November 2025	Stade Atlantique, Bordeaux, France	Fiji	19–0	34–21	2025 Autumn internationals
18	5 February 2026	Stade de France, Saint-Denis, France	Ireland	20–0	36–14	2026 Six Nations
19	15 February 2026	Millennium Stadium, Cardiff, Wales	Wales	7–52	12–54	2026 Six Nations

== Honours ==
Toulon

- 2× Top 14 runner-up: 2016, 2017
- 1× EPCR Challenge Cup: 2023
- 2× EPCR Challenge Cup runner-up: 2020, 2022

France

- 1x Six Nations Championship: 2026
- 4× Six Nations Championship runner-up: 2020, 2021, 2023, 2024

Preceded by Guilhem Guirado	French national rugby union captain 2019–2021	Succeeded by Antoine Dupont
