= Anthony Bouthier =

France international rugby union player

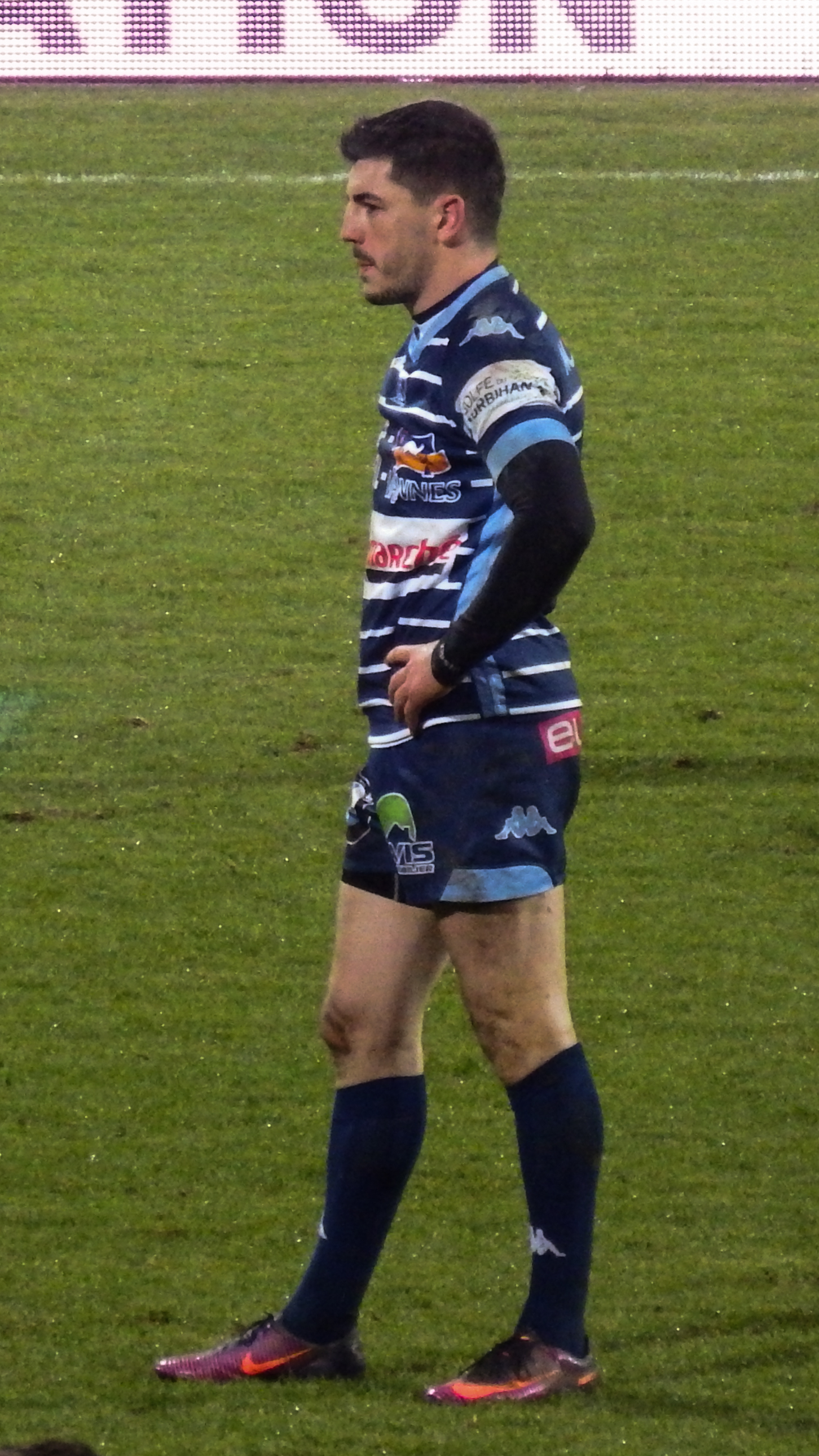
- Bouthier representing Vannes during the Pro D2
- Born: 16 June 1992 (age 34) Pouillon, France
- Height: 1.82 m (6 ft 0 in)
- Weight: 86 kg (190 lb; 13 st 8 lb)

Rugby union career
- Position(s): Fullback, Fly-half
- Current team: Vannes
Senior career
Years	Team	Apps	(Points)
2014–2019	Vannes	122	(352)
2019–2025	Montpellier	118	(261)
2025–	Vannes	11	(23)
- Correct as of 23 February 2026
International career
Years	Team	Apps	(Points)
2020–	France	8	(5)
- Correct as of 18 March 2023

Anthony Bouthier (born 16 June 1992) is a French professional rugby union player who plays as a fullback for Pro D2 club Vannes and the France national team.

== Career statistics ==
=== List of international tries ===
International tries
No.	Date	Venue	Opponent	Score	Result	Competition
1	22 February 2020	Principality Stadium, Cardiff, Wales	Wales	3–5	23–27	2020 Six Nations
