= Marco Lazzaroni =

Italy international rugby union player

- Full name: Marco Lazzaroni
- Born: 18 May 1995 (age 31) Udine, Italy
- Height: 1.91 m (6 ft 3 in)
- Weight: 115 kg (18 st 2 lb; 254 lb)

Rugby union career
- Position(s): Blindside Flanker; Lock
- Current team: Benetton
Youth career
- -2012: Mogliano
Senior career
Years	Team	Apps	(Points)
2013–2014	Mogliano	21	(5)
2014	Brive		
2014−2024	Benetton Rugby	129	(35)
2024–	Mogliano		
- Correct as of 14 May 2022
International career
Years	Team	Apps	(Points)
2013-2015	Italy U20	14	(0)
2017-2021	Italy	15	
2021	Italy A	1	
- Correct as of 13 Mar 2021
National sevens team
Years	Team		Comps
2018	Italy		1
- Correct as of 19 November 2022

Marco Lazzaroni (born 18 May 1995) is an Italian rugby union player who plays as a Lock. He currently competes for Mogliano in the Italian Serie A Elite.

Born in Udine, Marco played locally before joining Mogliano. In summer 2014, he joined Benetton Treviso. He played for United Rugby Championship team Benetton until 2023–24 United Rugby Championship season.

From 2013 to 2015, Lazzaroni was named in the Italy Under 20 squad and in 2018 in the Italy Sevens squad. From 2017 he was also member of Italy squad. On 8 November 2021 he was named in the Italy A squad for the 2021 end-of-year rugby union internationals.
