= Callum Braley =

Italy international rugby union player

- Born: Callum Braley; 20 March 1994 (age 32) Bristol, England
- Height: 1.78 m (5 ft 10 in)
- Weight: 83 kg (13 st 1 lb; 183 lb)
- School: Colston's School; Hartpury College

Rugby union career
- Position: Scrum-half
- Current team: Gloucester
Youth career
- St Mary's Old Boys RFC
Senior career
| Years | Team | Apps | (Points) |
| 2012–2014 | Bristol | 11 | (0) |
| 2014–2020 | Gloucester | 105 | (60) |
| 2017–2018 | → Hartpury College (loan) | 3 | (0) |
| 2020–2022 | Benetton | 24 | (20) |
| 2022–2024 | Northampton Saints | 18 | (10) |
| 2024 | Saracens | | |
| 2025 | Cardiff | | |
| 2026 | Gloucester | | |
- Correct as of 19 February 2026
International career
| Years | Team | Apps | (Points) |
| 2013–2014 | England Under 20 | 15 | (10) |
| 2019–2022 | Italy | 15 | (5) |
- Correct as of 5 January 2024

Callum Braley (born 23 March 1994) is an English-born Italian rugby union player who plays for Saracens in the Premiership Rugby.

Braley played his early rugby with St Mary's Old Boys RFC. His first taste of senior rugby came when he made his full debut at the age of 17, playing in two British and Irish Cup games for his home city club Bristol against Cornish Pirates and Ayr.

Braley has been an England age group international from U16 level upwards where, selected for England U20s, his team won the 2013 IRB Junior World Championship with a 23–15 win over Wales in the final held at Vannes, France. He also skippered the successful defence of England U20s Junior World Championship at the 2014 IRB Junior World Championship.

On 18 June 2014, Braley left Bristol to sign for Gloucester Rugby from the 2014–15 season.

In 2019, Braley gained his first senior international caps for Italy off the bench against Ireland and Russia in World Cup warm-up matches. Italy's final warm-up match gave Braley his first start against England. Braley qualifies for the Italian team through his Italian grandfather.

Braley was part of the Italy squad for the 2019 Rugby World Cup, and the 2020 Six Nations Championship. He has represented Italy on over 15 occasions with a try from 2019 to 2022.

Braley left Gloucester for Pro14 side Benetton at the end of the 2019–20 season. He played with Benetton until the 2021–22 season.

On 23 February 2022, Braley returns to England to join Northampton Saints back in the Premiership Rugby ahead of the 2022–23 season. On 20 August 2024, Braley would sign for Premiership rivals Saracens on a three-month deal as injury cover from the beginning of the 2024–25 season. In February 2025, Braley joined United Rugby Championship side Cardiff on a short-term deal. In February 2026, Braley rejoined Gloucester on a short-term deal as injury cover after he offered to come in as a training body and help where he can at the club. He was the registered to play.

== Career honours ==
England U20

- 2013 IRB Junior World Championship champions
- 2014 IRB Junior World Championship champions
- 2013 Six Nations Under 20s Championship champions
- 2014 Six Nations Under 20s Championship triple crown
