= Boris Palu =

French rugby union player (born 1996)

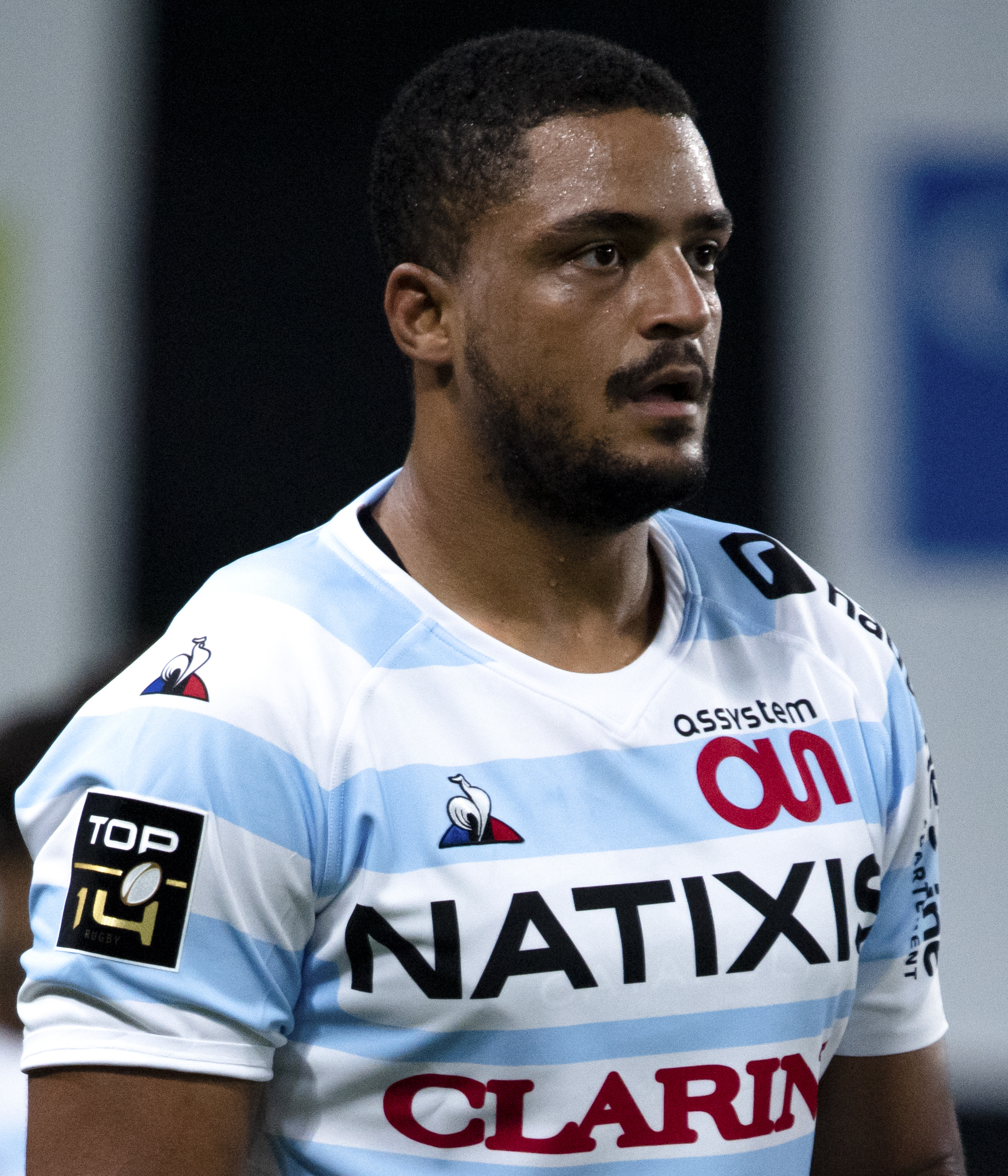
- Palu playing for Racing 92 in 2019
- Born: Boris Palu; 4 February 1996 (age 30) Toulouse, France
- Height: 1.93 m (6 ft 4 in)
- Weight: 113 kg (17 st 11 lb)

Rugby union career
- Position: Lock, Flanker
- Current team: Racing 92
Youth career
- 2008-2010: Laffitte St Germain Poissy
- 2010-2016: Racing 92
Senior career
Years	Team	Apps	(Points)
2016–	Racing 92	168	(20)
- Correct as of 23 January 2024
International career
Years	Team	Apps	(Points)
2018	French Barbarians	1	(0)
2020	France	2	(0)
- Correct as of 23 January 2024

Boris Palu (born 4 February 1996) is a French professional rugby union player. He currently plays at lock for Racing 92 in the Top 14.

== Personal life ==
Palu was born in France to a French father and Cameroonian mother, and spent his early childhood in Africa.
