= Dylan Cretin =

France international rugby union player (born 1997)

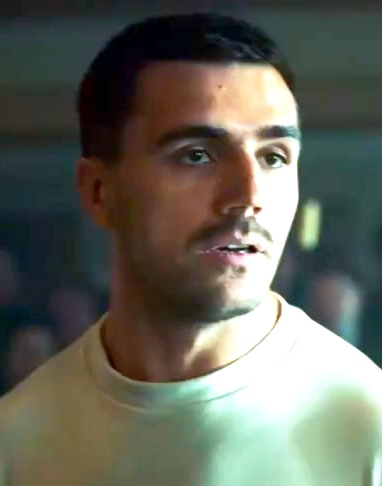
- Dylan Cretin in 2022
- Born: Dylan Cretin; 4 May 1997 (age 29) Annemasse, France
- Height: 1.95 m (6 ft 5 in)
- Weight: 105 kg (16 st 7 lb)

Rugby union career
- Position: Flanker
Amateur team(s)
Years	Team	Apps	(Points)
- RC Annemasse
Senior career
Years	Team	Apps	(Points)
2016–	Lyon	155	(115)
- Correct as of 25 March 2025
International career
Years	Team	Apps	(Points)
2017	France U20	7	(0)
2020–	France	22	(5)
- Correct as of 19 August 2023

Dylan Cretin (born 4 May 1997) is a French rugby union player. His usual position is as a flanker, and he currently plays for Lyon OU in the Top 14. In January 2020, Cretin was called into the French squad for the 2020 Six Nations Championship.

== International career ==
=== International tries ===
International trie
No.	Date	Venue	Opponent	Score	Result	Competition
1	6 February 2021	Stadio Olimpico, Rome, Italy	Italy	0–5	10–50	2021 Six Nations

== Honours ==
=== International ===
France

- Six Nations Championship: 2022
- Grand Slam: 2022
