= Mohamed Haouas =

France international rugby union player (born 1994)

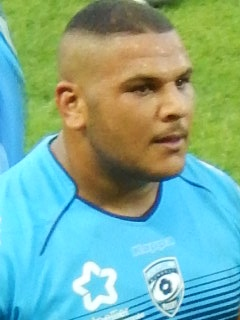
- Born: 9 March 1994 (age 32) Le Havre, France
- Height: 1.85 m (6 ft 1 in)
- Weight: 127 kg (280 lb; 20 st 0 lb)

Rugby union career
- Position: Prop
- Current team: Montpellier
Youth career
- 2004–2017: Montpellier
Senior career
Years	Team	Apps	(Points)
2017–2023	Montpellier	113	(25)
2023–2024	Biarritz	26	(5)
2024–	Montpellier	12	(0)
- Correct as of 2 April 2025
International career
Years	Team	Apps	(Points)
2020–2023	France	16	(0)
- Correct as of 9 December 2023

Mohamed Haouas (born 9 March 1994) is an international French rugby union player. His position is prop. He measures 1.85 m and weighs 127 kg. He has played for the French national side as well as Clermont Auvergne, Biarritz and Montpellier.

Haouas was banned from playing for three weeks in 2020 after punching Scottish player Jamie Ritchie during the 2020 Six Nations Championship. In February 2023 he became the first ever player to be sent off twice playing for the French international team after headbutting Scotland’s Ben White.

== Honours ==
=== International ===
France

- Six Nations Championship: 2022
- Grand Slam: 2022

=== Montpellier ===
- Top 14: 2021-22
- European Rugby Challenge Cup: 2020–2021

== Personal life ==
Haouas was born in France and is of Algerian descent.

Haouas faced several legal troubles. On 4 February 2022, Haouas was sentenced for his role in a series of burglaries of tobacco merchants in France in 2014. He was handed an 18-month suspended prison sentence and fined the equivalent of £13,000.

On 12 May 2023, he received a 2-year suspended prison sentence for a violent brawl in a bakery after leaving a nightclub in 2014.

On 30 May 2023, he was brought up for immediate trial and received a one-year prison sentence after hitting his wife in public. Haouas reportedly chased, tripped and slapped his wife outside a shopping centre in Montpellier the week before the trial. Following the verdict, his intended club Clermont – for whom he signed a contract ahead of the 2023–24 Top 14 season – released a statement saying Haouas "will not be able to wear the colours" of the club. The French Rugby Federation also stated that Haouas's behaviour was "unacceptable and incompatible with the representation of [the] nation at the international level."

In 2024 the Montpellier rugby club announced they were re-signing Haouas as a prop for the prop for 2024/25 despite his domestic violence conviction. His one-year contract was conditional on "exemplary behaviour". "I am grateful for this opportunity and I will give everything, on and off the field, to prove right those who trusted me when I needed it most." said Haouas in a press statement. In August 2024, Montpellier director of rugby, Bernard Laporte commented on the decision, "“There was a real desire on the part of the president [Mohed Altrad] and me to bring him back. He went off the rails, but we shouldn’t talk to him anymore? Justice has been done, and he has the right to get his act together.”

In December 2024, Haouas was arrested for drunk driving. His blood-alcohol was 1.8 grams per litre of blood, which exceeded the 0.5g/l limit in France, and he was found unconscious behind the wheel of his parked vehicle. The arrest came just days after signing a new two-year contract.

== See also ==
- Montpellier Hérault Rugby
- French Rugby Federation
