= Nick Haining =

Scotland international rugby union player

- Born: Nicholas I. Haining; 1 September 1990 (age 36) Fremantle, Western Australia
- Height: 6 ft 4 in (193 cm)
- Weight: 18 st 4 lb (256 lb; 116 kg)

Rugby union career
- Position: Number 8
Senior career
Years	Team	Apps	(Points)
2013	Western Force		
2014–2017	Jersey Reds	66	(115)
2017–2019	Bristol Bears	22	(20)
2019–2023	Edinburgh Rugby	36	(0)
- Correct as of 26 April 2023
International career
Years	Team	Apps	(Points)
2020–2022	Scotland	11	(5)
- Correct as of 13 April 2023

Nick Haining (born 1 September 1990) is a Scottish rugby union player who last played for Edinburgh Rugby in the United Rugby Championship.

== Rugby Union career ==
=== Amateur career ===
Haining played for Cottesloe rugby club.

=== Professional career ===
He started his professional rugby union career in the academy of Western Force. Haining played for Western Force in their game against the 2013 British & Irish Lions.

In May 2014 Haining signed for Jersey in England's RFU Championship, the second tier.

In 2017 he joined Bristol.

In 2019 he signed for Edinburgh.

=== International career ===
Haining is Scottish-Qualified, having a grandmother from Dundee.

Haining received his first call up to the senior Scotland squad on 15 January 2020 for the 2020 Six Nations Championship. He was selected to start his first international in the first round of Championship matches, against Ireland in Dublin. He made his debut in the match.
