= Adam Hastings =

Scottish rugby union player

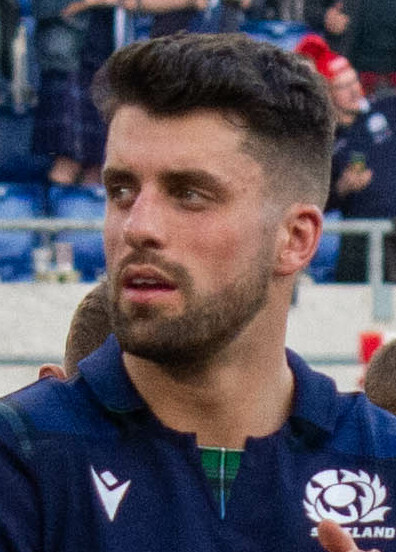
- Hastings representing Scotland during the Six Nations Championship
- Born: 5 October 1996 (age 30) Edinburgh, Scotland
- Height: 1.85 m (6 ft 1 in)
- Weight: 87 kg (192 lb; 13 st 10 lb)
- School: George Watson's College; Millfield
- Notable relative(s): Gavin Hastings (father); Scott Hastings (uncle)

Rugby union career
- Position(s): Fly-half, Centre, Fullback
- Current team: Montpellier
Senior career
Years	Team	Apps	(Points)
2016–2017	Bath	12	(10)
2017–2021	Glasgow Warriors	53	(407)
2021–2024	Gloucester	39	(326)
2024–2026	Glasgow Warriors	28	(93)
2026-	Montpellier	3	(14)
- Correct as of 16 October 2026
International career
Years	Team	Apps	(Points)
2016	Scotland U20	7	(37)
2018–	Scotland	34	(152)
- Correct as of 3 November 2024

Adam Hastings (born 5 October 1996) is a Scottish international rugby union player who plays as a fly-half for Montpellier and the Scotland national team. He previously played for Gloucester and Bath and Glasgow.

== Amateur career ==
Hastings played rugby at school for George Watson's College in Edinburgh and with Millfield School in Somerset, England.

He won two Scottish Schools Cup titles with George Watson's College.

Hastings was drafted to Currie in the Scottish Premiership for the 2017–18 season.

Hastings was drafted to Stirling County in the Scottish Premiership for the 2018–19 season.

== Professional career ==
He started his professional rugby union career with Bath, signing for their academy in 2014. He went on to play for the senior team.

In April 2017 it was announced that Hastings would sign for Glasgow Warriors for season 2017–18 in a two-year contract running through to May 2019.

In September 2017, Hastings made his debut for Glasgow in their opening match of the 2017 Pro 14 Season against Connacht, assisting in a try.

In December 2020, it was confirmed that he had signed for Premiership Rugby team Gloucester from the 2021–22 season.

In February 2024, it was announced that Hastings is to re-join former club Glasgow Warriors when his contract with Gloucester runs out at the end of the 2023–24 season.

In January 2026, it was announced that Hastings would be leaving Glasgow Warriors to join Montpellier at the end of the 2025-2026 season on a two-year deal.

== International career ==
Hastings has come through the Scottish international set-up. He was also named in the extended Scotland squad in the lead up to the 2018 Six Nations championship game vs Italy. He has gained caps at Scotland U16, Scotland U18, Scotland U19 and Scotland U20.

He received his first senior cap against Canada on 9 June 2018.

On 9 October 2019 Hastings scored two tries and kicked eight conversions in a 61–0 win over Russia at the 2019 Rugby World Cup.

He was named in Gregor Townsend's 38 man Scotland squad for the 2020 Six Nations Championship. He started against Ireland, England, Italy and France and being set to start against Wales before the COVID-19 pandemic prevented that match from going ahead.

== Personal life ==
He has represented Scotland Schools at javelin at under 17. Hastings is the son of ex-Scotland international rugby union captain Gavin Hastings; and the nephew of the late ex-Scotland international rugby union player Scott Hastings.
