= Stuart McInally =

Scotland international rugby union player

- Born: 9 August 1990 (age 36) Edinburgh, Scotland
- Height: 1.90 m (6 ft 3 in)
- Weight: 110 kg (243 lb; 17 st 5 lb)
- School: George Watson's College

Rugby union career
- Position(s): Hooker, Flanker
Senior career
Years	Team	Apps	(Points)
2009–2023	Edinburgh	177	(115)
2014	→ Bristol Bears (loan)	5	(0)
- Correct as of 26 April 2023
International career
Years	Team	Apps	(Points)
2008–2010	Scotland U20	20	(25)
2015–2023	Scotland	49	(55)
- Correct as of 12 August 2023

Stuart McInally (born 9 August 1990) is a retired Scottish professional rugby union player who played as a hooker most notably for United Rugby Championship club Edinburgh and the Scotland national team.

== Professional career ==
McInally made his Edinburgh debut in 2010, and became a regular in the team over the subsequent three seasons. In 2013 it was announced that he would be making the transformation from flanker to hooker, then in 2014 RFU Championship side Bristol Rugby signed him on loan. He made his competitive debut in his new position for Edinburgh in early 2015, and was called up to the Scotland squad for the 2015 summer tests. After securing his first caps in the double-header victories against Italy, McInally was named in the final 31-man squad for the 2015 Rugby World Cup by Head Coach Vern Cotter. However he then had to withdraw from the squad through injury and was replaced by Kevin Bryce. In 2018 he captained the Scotland team against Argentina in a match which ended 44–15 to Scotland.

In January 2016 McInally signed a contract extension with Edinburgh. In August 2016, Edinburgh Rugby named him and Grant Gilchrist as their co-captains for the coming season.

In April 2023, McInally announced that he would retire from professional rugby after the 2023 Rugby World Cup. He was not initially included in the Scotland squad announced in August but brought in as a replacement for the injured Dave Cherry. McInally was subsequently injured in training and did not take part in the tournament.
