= Giosuè Zilocchi =

Italy international rugby union player

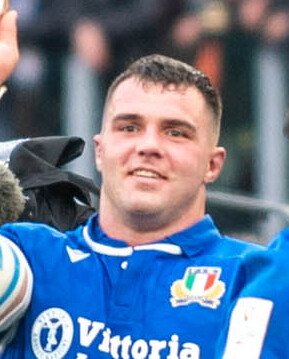
- Zilocchi in March 2024
- Born: 15 January 1997 (age 29) Fiorenzuola d'Arda, Italy
- Height: 1.86 m (6 ft 1 in)
- Weight: 112 kg (17 st 9 lb; 247 lb)

Rugby union career
- Position: Prop
- Current team: Benetton
Youth career
- 2005−2014: Elephant Rugby Gossolengo
- 2014−2015: Lyons Piacenza
Senior career
Years	Team	Apps	(Points)
2015−2016	F.I.R. Academy		
2016−2017	Lyons Piacenza	10	(5)
2017–2018	Calvisano	10	(10)
2018–2022	Zebre	38	(0)
2022–2023	London Irish	0	(0)
2023–	Benetton	47	(0)
- Correct as of 29 Aug 2026
International career
Years	Team	Apps	(Points)
2016−2017	Italy Under 20	8	(0)
2018–	Italy	27	(0)
- Correct as of 29 Aug 2026

Giosuè Zilocchi (born 15 January 1997) is an Italian professional rugby union player. His usual position is prop, and he currently plays for Benetton Rugby in United Rugby Championship.

He played with Zebre from 2018 to 2022. Zilocchi will come back in Italy to United Rugby Championship club Benetton Rugby on a two-year contract from the 2023–24 season after the experience with London Irish without official caps for injury. Zilocchi signed for Benetton Rugby in March 2023 ahead of the 2023–24 United Rugby Championship. He made his debut in Round 1 of the 2023–24 season against Cardiff.

In 2016 and 2017, Zilocchi was named in the Italy Under 20 squad. From 2018, he was also named in the Italy squad.
