= 2021 Six Nations Championship squads =

Rugby union competition squads

This is a list of the complete squads for the rugby union 2021 Six Nations Championship contested annually by the national rugby teams of England, France, Ireland, Italy, Scotland and Wales. England are the defending champions.

Note: Number of caps and players' ages are indicated as of 6 February 2021 – the tournament's opening day. For players added to a squad during the tournament, their caps and age are indicated as of the date of their call-up.

== England ==
On 22 January, Jones named a 28-man squad as well as a 12-man shadow squad for the Six Nations.

Head coach: (Australia) Eddie Jones

Player	Position	Date of birth (age)	Caps	Club/province
Luke Cowan-Dickie	Hooker	12 June 1993 (aged 27)	26	(England) Exeter Chiefs
Jamie George	Hooker	20 June 1990 (aged 30)	54	(England) Saracens
Ellis Genge	Prop	15 February 1995 (aged 25)	23	(England) Leicester Tigers
Joe Marler	Prop	7 July 1990 (aged 30)	72	(England) Harlequins
Beno Obano	Prop	25 October 1994 (aged 26)	0	(England) Bath
Will Stuart	Prop	12 July 1996 (aged 24)	8	(England) Bath
Harry Williams	Prop	1 October 1991 (aged 29)	18	(England) Exeter Chiefs
Jonny Hill	Lock	8 June 1994 (aged 26)	3	(England) Exeter Chiefs
Maro Itoje	Lock	28 October 1994 (aged 26)	43	(England) Saracens
Joe Launchbury	Lock	12 April 1991 (aged 29)	69	(England) Wasps
Courtney Lawes	Lock	23 February 1989 (aged 31)	85	(England) Northampton Saints
Tom Curry	Back row	15 June 1998 (aged 22)	28	(England) Sale Sharks
Ben Earl	Back row	7 January 1998 (aged 23)	8	(England) Bristol Bears
Sam Underhill	Back row	22 July 1996 (aged 24)	22	(England) Bath
Billy Vunipola	Back row	3 November 1992 (aged 28)	56	(England) Saracens
Mark Wilson	Back row	6 October 1989 (aged 31)	19	(England) Newcastle Falcons
Harry Randall	Scrum-half	18 December 1997 (aged 23)	0	(England) Bristol Bears
Dan Robson	Scrum-half	14 March 1992 (aged 28)	7	(England) Wasps
Ben Youngs	Scrum-half	5 September 1989 (aged 31)	104	(England) Leicester Tigers
Owen Farrell (c)	Fly-half	24 September 1991 (aged 29)	88	(England) Saracens
George Ford	Fly-half	16 March 1993 (aged 27)	72	(England) Leicester Tigers
Ollie Lawrence	Centre	18 September 1999 (aged 21)	3	(England) Worcester Warriors
Henry Slade	Centre	13 March 1993 (aged 27)	34	(England) Exeter Chiefs
Jonny May	Wing	1 May 1990 (aged 30)	61	(England) Gloucester
Paolo Odogwu	Wing	18 February 1997 (aged 23)	0	(England) Wasps
Anthony Watson	Wing	26 February 1994 (aged 26)	46	(England) Bath
Elliot Daly	Fullback	8 October 1992 (aged 28)	47	(England) Saracens
Max Malins	Fullback	7 January 1997 (aged 24)	3	(England) Bristol Bears

=== Shadow squad ===
Player	Position	Date of birth (age)	Caps	Club/province
Tom Dunn	Hooker	12 November 1992 (aged 28)	3	(England) Bath
Joe Heyes	Prop	13 April 1999 (aged 21)	0	(England) Leicester Tigers
Charlie Ewels	Lock	29 June 1995 (aged 25)	17	(England) Bath
George Martin	Lock	18 June 2001 (aged 19)	0	(England) Leicester Tigers
Jack Willis	Back row	24 December 1996 (aged 24)	2	(England) Wasps
Alex Mitchell	Scrum-half	25 May 1997 (aged 23)	0	(England) Northampton Saints
Charlie Atkinson	Fly-half	6 October 2001 (aged 19)	0	(England) Wasps
Jacob Umaga	Fly-half	8 July 1998 (aged 22)	0	(England) Wasps
Jonathan Joseph	Centre	21 May 1991 (aged 29)	54	(England) Bath
Joe Marchant	Centre	6 February 1996 (aged 25)	4	(England) Harlequins
Alistair Crossdale	Wing	9 January 1998 (aged 23)	0	(England) Saracens
George Furbank	Fullback	17 October 1996 (aged 24)	3	(England) Northampton Saints

Call-ups
On 9 February, Kyle Sinckler and Mako Vunipola were called up to the squad, while Tom West and Harry Williams returned to their clubs.

On 18 February, George Martin was called up to the squad, replacing the injured Jack Willis, who had been called into the full squad ahead of the match against Italy.

On 21 February, Alex Mitchell was called up to the squad, replacing the injured Harry Randall.

On 3 March, David Ribbans was called up to the squad, replacing the injured Courtney Lawes.

Player	Position	Date of birth (age)	Caps	Club/province
Kyle Sinckler	Prop	30 March 1993 (aged 27)	40	(England) Bristol Bears
Mako Vunipola	Prop	14 January 1991 (aged 30)	63	(England) Saracens
David Ribbans	Lock	29 August 1995 (aged 25)	0	(England) Northampton Saints

== France ==
On 31 January 2021, Galthié named his official 31-man squad for the 2021 Six Nations Championship.

Head coach: (France) Fabien Galthié

Player	Position	Date of birth (age)	Caps	Club/province
Pierre Bourgarit	Hooker	12 September 1997 (aged 23)	3	(France) La Rochelle
Julien Marchand	Hooker	10 May 1995 (aged 25)	9	(France) Toulouse
Peato Mauvaka	Hooker	10 January 1997 (aged 24)	6	(France) Toulouse
Dorian Aldegheri	Prop	4 August 1993 (aged 27)	6	(France) Toulouse
Cyril Baille	Prop	15 September 1993 (aged 27)	23	(France) Toulouse
Georges-Henri Colombe	Prop	9 April 1998 (aged 22)	0	(France) Racing 92
Jean-Baptiste Gros	Prop	29 May 1999 (aged 21)	5	(France) Toulon
Mohamed Haouas	Prop	9 June 1994 (aged 26)	7	(France) Montpellier
Kilian Geraci	Lock	25 March 1999 (aged 21)	2	(France) Lyon
Bernard Le Roux	Lock	4 June 1989 (aged 31)	44	(France) Racing 92
Romain Taofifénua	Lock	14 September 1990 (aged 30)	22	(France) Toulon
Paul Willemse	Lock	13 November 1992 (aged 28)	12	(France) Montpellier
Grégory Alldritt	Back row	23 March 1997 (aged 23)	18	(France) La Rochelle
Dylan Cretin	Back row	4 May 1997 (aged 23)	5	(France) Lyon
Anthony Jelonch	Back row	28 July 1996 (aged 24)	4	(France) Castres Olympique
Charles Ollivon (c)	Back row	11 May 1993 (aged 27)	18	(France) Toulon
Baptiste Pesenti	Back row	3 July 1997 (aged 23)	2	(France) Pau
Cameron Woki	Back row	7 November 1998 (aged 22)	4	(France) Bordeaux Bègles
Baptiste Couilloud	Scrum-half	22 July 1997 (aged 23)	5	(France) Lyon
Antoine Dupont	Scrum-half	15 November 1996 (aged 24)	27	(France) Toulouse
Baptiste Serin	Scrum-half	20 June 1994 (aged 26)	40	(France) Toulon
Louis Carbonel	Fly-half	4 February 1999 (aged 22)	2	(France) Toulon
Matthieu Jalibert	Fly-half	6 November 1998 (aged 22)	8	(France) Bordeaux Bègles
Pierre-Louis Barassi	Centre	22 April 1998 (aged 22)	2	(France) Lyon
Gaël Fickou	Centre	26 March 1994 (aged 26)	58	(France) Stade Français
Arthur Vincent	Centre	30 September 1999 (aged 21)	7	(France) Montpellier
Damian Penaud	Wing	25 September 1996 (aged 24)	17	(France) Clermont Auvergne
Teddy Thomas	Wing	18 September 1993 (aged 27)	22	(France) Racing 92
Gabin Villière	Wing	13 December 1995 (aged 25)	2	(France) Toulon
Anthony Bouthier	Fullback	19 June 1992 (aged 28)	6	(France) Montpellier
Brice Dulin	Fullback	13 April 1990 (aged 30)	31	(France) La Rochelle

Call-ups
On 9 February, Uini Antonio & Hassane Kolingar replaced Georges-Henri Colombe & Jean-Baptiste Gros.
On 17 February, Demba Bamba, Jean-Baptiste Gros & Swann Rebbadj replaced Dorian Aldegheri, Hassane Kolingar & Baptiste Pesenti.
On 21 February, following a COVID-19 outbreak in the French squad, Dorian Aldegheri, Teddy Baubigny, Jonathan Danty, Hassane Kolingar, Maxime Lucu, Yoram Moefana and Donovan Taofifénua replaced Antoine Dupont, Jean-Baptiste Gros, Mohamed Haouas, Julien Marchand, Swann Rebbadj, Gabin Villière and Arthur Vincent.
On 22 February, following further COVID-19 cases, Gaëtan Barlot, Cyril Cazeaux, Thierry Paiva, Baptiste Pesenti and Thomas Ramos were called into the squad to replace Cyril Baille, Bruce Dulin, Peato Mauvaka, Charles Ollivon and Romain Taofifénua.
On 7 March, Cyril Baille, Camille Chat, Brice Dulin, Antoine Dupont, Jean-Baptiste Gros, Mohamed Haouas, Wilfred Hounkpatin, Julien Marchand, Romain Ntamack, Charles Ollivon, Romain Taofifénua and Virimi Vakatawa were added to the squad, while Uini Atonio, Demba Bamba, Pierre-Louis Barassi, Gaëtan Barlot, Teddy Baubigny, Louis Carbonel, Kilian Geraci, Hassane Kolingar, Maxime Lucu, Thierry Paiva, Baptiste Pesenti and Thomas Ramos were withdrawn.
On 9 March, Swan Rebbadj replaced Bernard Le Roux in the squad, who was ruled out with injury.
On 16 March, Uini Atonio and Arthur Vincent were called into the squad, while Jonathan Danty and Wilfrid Hounkpatin were withdrawn.
On 22 March, Louis Carbonel replaced Matthieu Jalibert in the squad.

Player	Position	Date of birth (age)	Caps	Club/province
Gaëtan Barlot	Hooker	13 April 1997 (aged 23)	0	(France) Castres
Teddy Baubigny	Hooker	2 September 1998 (aged 22)	1	(France) Racing 92
Camille Chat	Hooker	18 December 1995 (aged 25)	31	(France) Racing 92
Uini Atonio	Prop	26 March 1990 (aged 30)	34	(France) La Rochelle
Demba Bamba	Prop	17 March 1998 (aged 22)	14	(France) Lyon
Wilfrid Hounkpatin	Prop	29 July 1991 (aged 29)	0	(France) Castres
Hassane Kolingar	Prop	6 March 1998 (aged 22)	2	(France) Racing 92
Thierry Paiva	Prop	19 November 1995 (aged 25)	0	(France) Bordeaux Bègles
Cyril Cazeaux	Lock	10 February 1995 (aged 26)	1	(France) Bordeaux Bègles
Swan Rebbadj	Lock	15 January 1995 (aged 26)	1	(France) Toulon
Maxime Lucu	Scrum-half	12 January 1993 (aged 28)	0	(France) Bordeaux Bègles
Romain Ntamack	Fly-half	1 May 1999 (aged 21)	18	(France) Toulouse
Jonathan Danty	Centre	7 October 1992 (aged 28)	7	(France) Stade Français
Yoram Moefana	Centre	18 July 2000 (aged 20)	2	(France) Bordeaux Bègles
Virimi Vakatawa	Centre	1 May 1992 (aged 28)	27	(France) Racing 92
Donovan Taofifénua	Wing	30 March 1999 (aged 21)	0	(France) Racing 92
Thomas Ramos	Fullback	23 July 1995 (aged 25)	14	(France) Toulouse

== Ireland ==
On 25 January 2021, Farrell named a 36-man squad for the Six Nations.

Head coach: (England) Andy Farrell

Player	Position	Date of birth (age)	Caps	Club/province
Dave Heffernan	Hooker	31 January 1991 (aged 30)	5	(Ireland) Connacht
Rob Herring	Hooker	27 April 1990 (aged 30)	16	(Ireland) Ulster
Rónan Kelleher	Hooker	21 January 1998 (aged 23)	6	(Ireland) Leinster
Tadhg Furlong	Prop	14 November 1992 (aged 28)	44	(Ireland) Leinster
Cian Healy	Prop	7 October 1987 (aged 33)	104	(Ireland) Leinster
Dave Kilcoyne	Prop	14 December 1988 (aged 32)	39	(Ireland) Munster
Tom O'Toole	Prop	23 September 1998 (aged 22)	0	(Ireland) Ulster
Andrew Porter	Prop	16 January 1996 (aged 25)	32	(Ireland) Leinster
Tadhg Beirne	Lock	8 January 1992 (aged 29)	17	(Ireland) Munster
Ultan Dillane	Lock	9 November 1993 (aged 27)	17	(Ireland) Connacht
Iain Henderson	Lock	21 February 1992 (aged 28)	58	(Ireland) Ulster
Quinn Roux	Lock	30 October 1990 (aged 30)	16	(Ireland) Connacht
James Ryan	Lock	24 July 1996 (aged 24)	32	(Ireland) Leinster
Will Connors	Back row	4 April 1996 (aged 24)	5	(Ireland) Leinster
Caelan Doris	Back row	2 April 1998 (aged 22)	7	(Ireland) Leinster
Peter O'Mahony	Back row	17 September 1989 (aged 31)	73	(Ireland) Munster
Rhys Ruddock	Back row	13 November 1990 (aged 30)	26	(Ireland) Leinster
CJ Stander	Back row	5 April 1990 (aged 30)	46	(Ireland) Munster
Josh van der Flier	Back row	25 April 1993 (aged 27)	28	(Ireland) Leinster
Craig Casey	Scrum-half	19 April 1999 (aged 21)	0	(Ireland) Munster
Jamison Gibson-Park	Scrum-half	23 February 1992 (aged 28)	5	(Ireland) Leinster
Conor Murray	Scrum-half	20 April 1989 (aged 31)	87	(Ireland) Munster
Billy Burns	Fly-half	13 June 1994 (aged 26)	3	(Ireland) Ulster
Ross Byrne	Fly-half	8 April 1995 (aged 25)	11	(Ireland) Leinster
Johnny Sexton (c)	Fly-half	11 July 1985 (aged 35)	95	(Ireland) Leinster
Bundee Aki	Centre	7 April 1990 (aged 30)	30	(Ireland) Connacht
Chris Farrell	Centre	16 March 1993 (aged 27)	14	(Ireland) Munster
Robbie Henshaw	Centre	12 June 1993 (aged 27)	47	(Ireland) Leinster
Stuart McCloskey	Centre	6 August 1992 (aged 28)	4	(Ireland) Ulster
Garry Ringrose	Centre	26 January 1995 (aged 26)	30	(Ireland) Leinster
Andrew Conway	Wing	11 July 1991 (aged 29)	24	(Ireland) Munster
Keith Earls	Wing	2 October 1987 (aged 33)	88	(Ireland) Munster
Jordan Larmour	Wing	10 June 1997 (aged 23)	24	(Ireland) Leinster
Hugo Keenan	Wing	18 June 1996 (aged 24)	6	(Ireland) Leinster
James Lowe	Wing	8 July 1992 (aged 28)	2	(Ireland) Leinster
Shane Daly	Fullback	19 December 1996 (aged 24)	1	(Ireland) Munster

Call-ups
On 2 February, Ryan Baird and Gavin Coombes replaced Caelan Doris and Quinn Roux due to injury.
On 9 February, Ed Byrne and Jack Conan were called into the international squad, while Gavin Coombes returned to his club side.
On 13 February, Harry Byrne and John Cooney were called into the squad as additional cover following injuries to Conor Murray and Johnny Sexton.
On 21 February, Harry Byrne and John Cooney returned to their club sides, while Peter O'Mahony was also ruled out due to suspension.
On 8 March, Jacob Stockdale was called into the squad, while Shane Daly returned to his club side.
On 15 March, Finlay Bealham and Peter O'Mahony were called into the squad, while Tom O'Toole, Garry Ringrose and James Ryan were released due to injury.

Player	Position	Date of birth (age)	Caps	Club/province
Finlay Bealham	Prop	9 October 1991 (aged 29)	14	(Ireland) Connacht
Ed Byrne	Prop	9 September 1993 (aged 27)	3	(Ireland) Leinster
Ryan Baird	Lock	26 July 1999 (aged 21)	0	(Ireland) Leinster
Jack Conan	Back row	29 July 1992 (aged 28)	17	(Ireland) Leinster
Gavin Coombes	Back row	11 December 1997 (aged 23)	0	(Ireland) Munster
John Cooney	Scrum-half	1 May 1990 (aged 30)	11	(Ireland) Ulster
Harry Byrne	Fly-half	22 April 1999 (aged 21)	0	(Ireland) Leinster
Jacob Stockdale	Wing	3 April 1996 (aged 24)	33	(Ireland) Ulster

== Italy ==
On 25 January 2021, Smith named a 32-man squad and five invited players for the Six Nations.

Head coach: (South Africa) Franco Smith

Player	Position	Date of birth (age)	Caps	Club/province
Luca Bigi (c)	Hooker	19 April 1991 (aged 29)	32	(Italy) Zebre
Gianmarco Lucchesi	Hooker	10 September 2000 (aged 20)	2	(Italy) Benetton
Marco Manfredi	Hooker	18 September 1997 (aged 23)	0	(Italy) Zebre
Pietro Ceccarelli	Prop	16 February 1992 (aged 28)	14	(France) Brive
Danilo Fischetti	Prop	26 January 1998 (aged 23)	8	(Italy) Zebre
Marco Riccioni	Prop	19 October 1997 (aged 23)	7	(Italy) Benetton
Daniele Rimpelli	Prop	23 June 1997 (aged 23)	0	(Italy) Zebre
Cherif Traorè	Prop	10 April 1994 (aged 26)	10	(Italy) Benetton
Giosuè Zilocchi	Prop	15 January 1997 (aged 24)	10	(Italy) Zebre
Niccolò Cannone	Lock	17 May 1998 (aged 22)	8	(Italy) Benetton
Riccardo Favretto	Lock	10 October 2001 (aged 19)	0	(Italy) Mogliano/Benetton
Marco Lazzaroni	Lock	18 May 1995 (aged 25)	11	(Italy) Benetton
David Sisi	Lock	5 February 1993 (aged 28)	11	(Italy) Zebre
Cristian Stoian	Lock	19 December 1999 (aged 21)	2	(Italy) Fiamme Oro/Zebre
Michele Lamaro	Back row	3 June 1998 (aged 22)	2	(Italy) Benetton
Maxime Mbanda	Back row	10 April 1992 (aged 28)	25	(Italy) Zebre
Johan Meyer	Back row	26 February 1993 (aged 27)	9	(Italy) Zebre
Sebastian Negri	Back row	30 June 1994 (aged 26)	28	(Italy) Benetton
Federico Ruzza	Back row	4 August 1994 (aged 26)	19	(Italy) Benetton
Callum Braley	Scrum-half	24 March 1994 (aged 26)	9	(Italy) Benetton
Guglielmo Palazzani	Scrum-half	11 April 1991 (aged 29)	41	(Italy) Zebre
Stephen Varney	Scrum-half	16 May 2001 (aged 19)	3	(England) Gloucester
Tommaso Allan	Fly-half	26 April 1993 (aged 27)	60	(Italy) Benetton
Carlo Canna	Fly-half	25 August 1992 (aged 28)	47	(Italy) Zebre
Paolo Garbisi	Fly-half	26 April 2000 (aged 20)	5	(Italy) Benetton
Ignacio Brex	Centre	26 May 1992 (aged 28)	0	(Italy) Benetton
Federico Mori	Centre	13 October 2000 (aged 20)	5	(Italy) Calvisano/Zebre
Marco Zanon	Centre	3 October 1997 (aged 23)	4	(Italy) Benetton
Mattia Bellini	Wing	8 February 1994 (aged 26)	28	(Italy) Zebre
Monty Ioane	Wing	30 October 1994 (aged 26)	1	(Italy) Benetton
Luca Sperandio	Wing	28 January 1996 (aged 25)	6	(Italy) Benetton
Jacopo Trulla	Fullback	5 November 2000 (aged 20)	3	(Italy) Calvisano/Zebre

=== Invited players ===
Player	Position	Date of birth (age)	Caps	Club/province
Renato Giammarioli	Back row	23 March 1995 (aged 25)	4	(Italy) Zebre
Marcello Violi	Scrum-half	11 October 1993 (aged 27)	19	(Italy) Zebre
Tommaso Boni	Centre	15 January 1993 (aged 28)	11	(Italy) Zebre
Tommaso Menoncello	Centre	20 August 2002 (aged 18)	0	(Italy) F.I.R. Academy/Benetton
Michelangelo Biondelli	Fullback	15 May 1998 (aged 22)	0	(Italy) Zebre

Call-ups
On 8 February, Pierre Bruno and Andrea Lovotti were added to the squad, while Marco Zanon withdrew due to injury.
On 15 February, Marco Zanon returned to the squad after overcoming injury.
On 22 February, it was announced that Daniele Rimpelli and Cristian Stoian had returned to their club sides.
On 2 March, Edoardo Padovani, Daniele Rimpelli and Marcello Violi were added to the squad, while Pierre Bruno, Guglielmo Palazzani and Cherif Traorè returned to their clubs. Andrea Zambonin was also invited to train with the side.
On 8 March, Oliviero Fabiani was called up to the squad, while Riccardo Favretto returned to his club.
On 15 March, Pierre Bruno, Riccardo Favretto were called into the squad and Andrea Zambonin was called into the main squad, while Tommaso Allan, Marco Lazzaroni, Marco Manfredi and Luca Sperandio were released.

Player	Position	Date of birth (age)	Caps	Club/province
Oliviero Fabiani	Hooker	13 July 1990 (aged 30)	10	(Italy) Zebre
Andrea Lovotti	Prop	28 July 1989 (aged 31)	43	(Italy) Zebre
Andrea Zambonin	Lock	3 September 2000 (aged 20)	0	(Italy) Calvisano
Pierre Bruno	Wing	28 June 1996 (aged 24)	0	(Italy) Zebre
Edoardo Padovani	Fullback	15 May 1993 (aged 27)	26	(Italy) Benetton

== Scotland ==
On 20 January, Townsend named a 35-man squad for the Six Nations.

Head coach: (Scotland) Gregor Townsend

Player	Position	Date of birth (age)	Caps	Club/province
Ewan Ashman	Hooker	3 April 2000 (aged 20)	0	(England) Sale Sharks
Dave Cherry	Hooker	3 January 1991 (aged 30)	0	(Scotland) Edinburgh
Grant Stewart	Hooker	28 February 1995 (aged 25)	3	(Scotland) Glasgow Warriors
George Turner	Hooker	8 October 1992 (aged 28)	12	(Scotland) Glasgow Warriors
Simon Berghan	Prop	7 December 1990 (aged 30)	28	(Scotland) Edinburgh
Allan Dell	Prop	16 March 1992 (aged 28)	32	(England) London Irish
Zander Fagerson	Prop	16 January 1996 (aged 25)	34	(Scotland) Glasgow Warriors
Oli Kebble	Prop	18 June 1992 (aged 28)	5	(Scotland) Glasgow Warriors
WP Nel	Prop	30 April 1986 (aged 34)	40	(Scotland) Glasgow Warriors
Rory Sutherland	Prop	24 August 1992 (aged 28)	11	(Scotland) Glasgow Warriors
Alex Craig	Lock	21 April 1997 (aged 23)	0	(England) Gloucester
Scott Cummings	Lock	3 December 1996 (aged 24)	17	(Scotland) Glasgow Warriors
Grant Gilchrist	Lock	9 August 1990 (aged 30)	42	(Scotland) Glasgow Warriors
Jonny Gray	Lock	14 March 1994 (aged 26)	61	(England) Exeter Chiefs
Richie Gray	Lock	24 August 1989 (aged 31)	65	(Scotland) Glasgow Warriors
Matt Fagerson	Back row	16 July 1998 (aged 22)	9	(Scotland) Glasgow Warriors
Gary Graham	Back row	29 August 1992 (aged 28)	2	(England) Newcastle Falcons
Jamie Ritchie	Back row	16 August 1996 (aged 24)	23	(Scotland) Edinburgh
Blade Thomson	Back row	4 December 1990 (aged 30)	9	(Wales) Scarlets
Hamish Watson	Back row	15 October 1991 (aged 29)	36	(Scotland) Edinburgh
Ali Price	Scrum-half	12 March 1993 (aged 27)	37	(Scotland) Glasgow Warriors
Scott Steele	Scrum-half	24 July 1993 (aged 27)	1	(England) Harlequins
Finn Russell	Fly-half	23 September 1992 (aged 28)	51	(France) Racing 92
Jaco van der Walt	Fly-half	1 February 1994 (aged 27)	1	(Scotland) Edinburgh
Chris Harris	Centre	28 December 1990 (aged 30)	23	(England) Gloucester
Huw Jones	Centre	17 December 1993 (aged 27)	26	(Scotland) Glasgow Warriors
James Lang	Centre	4 April 1995 (aged 25)	5	(England) Harlequins
Cameron Redpath	Centre	23 December 1999 (aged 21)	0	(England) Bath
Duncan Taylor	Centre	5 September 1989 (aged 31)	23	(England) Saracens
Darcy Graham	Wing	21 June 1997 (aged 23)	15	(Scotland) Edinburgh
Sean Maitland	Wing	14 July 1988 (aged 32)	50	(England) Saracens
Byron McGuigan	Wing	20 August 1989 (aged 31)	10	(England) Sale Sharks
Duhan van der Merwe	Wing	4 June 1995 (aged 25)	5	(Scotland) Edinburgh
Stuart Hogg (c)	Fullback	24 June 1992 (aged 28)	80	(England) Exeter Chiefs
Blair Kinghorn	Fullback	18 January 1997 (aged 24)	25	(Scotland) Edinburgh

=== Invited players ===
Player	Position	Date of birth (age)	Caps	Club/province
Jamie Dobie	Scrum-half	7 June 2001 (aged 19)	0	(Scotland) Glasgow Warriors
Rufus McLean	Fullback	2 March 2000 (aged 20)	0	(Scotland) Glasgow Warriors

Call-ups
On 8 February, D'Arcy Rae, Charlie Shiel and George Taylor were called into the squad, while Ewan Ashman, Jamie Dobie, Blair Kinghorn and Rufus McLean returned to their clubs.
On 21 February, Ewan Ashman, Josh Bayliss, Jamie Bhatti, Jamie Dobie, Cornell du Preez, Rob Harley, Adam Hastings and Sam Johnson were called into the squad, while Allan Dell, Gary Graham, Byron McGuigan, D'Arcy Rae, Cameron Redpath, Charlie Shiel, George Taylor, Blade Thomson and Zander Ferguson were withdrawn. Matt Currie and Ben Muncaster were also invited to train with the squad.
On 8 March, Nick Haining, Sam Skinner and Rufus McLean were called into the squad, while Josh Bayliss, Richie Gray, Adam Hastings, Ben Muncaster and Grant Stewart were withdrawn. Rory Darge and Max Williamson were also invited to train with the squad.
On 15 March, Zander Ferguson, Damien Hoyland and Ally Miller were called into the squad, while Scott Cummings, Rufus McLean and Max Williamson were withdrawn. Alex Samuel was also invited to train with the squad.
On 22 March, Adam Hastings, Rufus McLean and Grant Stewart were called into the squad, while Ewan Ashman, Jamie Bhatti, Matt Currie, Rory Darge, Cornell du Preez, Jonny Gray, Damien Hoyland, James Lang, Sean Maitland, Ally Miller, Alex Samuel and Duncan Taylor were withdrawn.

Player	Position	Date of birth (age)	Caps	Club/province
Jamie Bhatti	Prop	8 September 1993 (aged 27)	16	(England) Bath
D'Arcy Rae	Prop	21 December 1994 (aged 26)	1	(Scotland) Glasgow Warriors
Alex Samuel	Lock	N/A	0	(Scotland) Glasgow Warriors
Sam Skinner	Lock	31 January 1995 (aged 26)	10	(England) Exeter Chiefs
Max Williamson	Lock	N/A	0	(Scotland) Glasgow Warriors
Josh Bayliss	Back row	18 September 1997 (aged 23)	0	(England) Bath
Rory Darge	Back row	23 February 2000 (aged 21)	0	(Scotland) Edinburgh
Cornell du Preez	Back row	23 March 1991 (aged 29)	9	(England) Worcester Warriors
Nick Haining	Back row	1 September 1990 (aged 30)	5	(Scotland) Edinburgh
Rob Harley	Back row	26 May 1990 (aged 30)	22	(Scotland) Glasgow Warriors
Ally Miller	Back row	10 May 1996 (aged 24)	0	(Scotland) Edinburgh
Ben Muncaster	Back row	14 October 2001 (aged 19)	0	(Scotland) Edinburgh
Charlie Shiel	Scrum-half	3 December 1997 (aged 23)	0	(Scotland) Edinburgh
Adam Hastings	Fly-half	5 October 1996 (aged 24)	22	(Scotland) Glasgow Warriors
Matt Currie	Centre	22 February 2001 (aged 19)	0	(Scotland) Edinburgh
Sam Johnson	Centre	19 June 1993 (aged 27)	15	(Scotland) Glasgow Warriors
George Taylor	Centre	24 November 1996 (aged 24)	0	(Scotland) Edinburgh
Damien Hoyland	Fullback	11 January 1994 (aged 27)	4	(Scotland) Edinburgh

== Wales ==
On 20 January, Pivac named a 36-man squad for the Six Nations.

Head coach: (New Zealand) Wayne Pivac

Player	Position	Date of birth (age)	Caps	Club/province
Elliot Dee	Hooker	7 March 1994 (aged 26)	32	(Wales) Dragons
Ryan Elias	Hooker	7 January 1995 (aged 26)	13	(Wales) Scarlets
Ken Owens	Hooker	3 January 1987 (aged 34)	77	(Wales) Scarlets
Leon Brown	Prop	26 October 1996 (aged 24)	12	(Wales) Dragons
Rhys Carré	Prop	8 February 1998 (aged 22)	12	(Wales) Cardiff Blues
Tomas Francis	Prop	27 April 1992 (aged 28)	52	(England) Exeter Chiefs
Wyn Jones	Prop	26 February 1992 (aged 28)	30	(Wales) Scarlets
Dillon Lewis	Prop	4 January 1996 (aged 25)	40	(Wales) Cardiff Blues
Jake Ball	Lock	21 June 1991 (aged 29)	49	(Wales) Scarlets
Adam Beard	Lock	7 January 1996 (aged 25)	21	(Wales) Ospreys
Cory Hill	Lock	10 February 1992 (aged 28)	29	(Wales) Cardiff Blues
Alun Wyn Jones (c)	Lock	19 September 1985 (aged 35)	143	(Wales) Ospreys
Will Rowlands	Lock	19 September 1991 (aged 29)	5	(England) Wasps
Taulupe Faletau	Back row	12 November 1990 (aged 30)	81	(England) Bath
Dan Lydiate	Back row	18 December 1987 (aged 33)	62	(Wales) Ospreys
Josh Macleod	Back row	27 October 1996 (aged 24)	0	(Wales) Scarlets
Josh Navidi	Back row	30 December 1990 (aged 30)	24	(Wales) Cardiff Blues
Justin Tipuric	Back row	6 August 1989 (aged 31)	80	(Wales) Ospreys
Aaron Wainwright	Back row	25 September 1997 (aged 23)	27	(Wales) Dragons
Gareth Davies	Scrum-half	18 August 1990 (aged 30)	57	(Wales) Scarlets
Kieran Hardy	Scrum-half	30 November 1995 (aged 25)	2	(Wales) Scarlets
Tomos Williams	Scrum-half	1 January 1995 (aged 26)	20	(Wales) Cardiff Blues
Dan Biggar	Fly-half	16 October 1989 (aged 31)	87	(England) Northampton Saints
Jarrod Evans	Fly-half	25 July 1995 (aged 25)	6	(Wales) Cardiff Blues
Callum Sheedy	Fly-half	28 October 1995 (aged 25)	4	(England) Bristol Bears
Jonathan Davies	Centre	5 April 1988 (aged 32)	85	(Wales) Scarlets
Nick Tompkins	Centre	16 February 1995 (aged 25)	8	(Wales) Dragons
Owen Watkin	Centre	12 October 1996 (aged 24)	23	(Wales) Ospreys
Johnny Williams	Centre	18 October 1996 (aged 24)	2	(Wales) Scarlets
Josh Adams	Wing	21 April 1995 (aged 25)	29	(Wales) Cardiff Blues
George North	Wing	13 April 1992 (aged 28)	98	(Wales) Ospreys
Louis Rees-Zammit	Wing	2 February 2001 (aged 20)	4	(England) Gloucester
Hallam Amos	Fullback	24 September 1994 (aged 26)	22	(Wales) Cardiff Blues
Leigh Halfpenny	Fullback	22 December 1988 (aged 32)	93	(Wales) Scarlets
Liam Williams	Fullback	9 April 1991 (aged 29)	67	(Wales) Scarlets

Call-ups
On 10 February, James Botham, Willis Halaholo and Lloyd Williams were called into the squad, while Dan Lydiate withdrew due to injury.
On 19 February, WillGriff John was called into the squad, with Dillon Lewis withdrawing through injury. Josh Macleod was also withdrawn from the squad following injury in the lead up to the match against Scotland.
On 4 March, Kieran Hardy was released from the squad due to injury.

Player	Position	Date of birth (age)	Caps	Club/province
WillGriff John	Prop	4 December 1992 (aged 28)	0	(England) Sale Sharks
James Botham	Back row	22 February 1998 (aged 22)	3	(Wales) Cardiff Blues
Lloyd Williams	Scrum-half	30 November 1989 (aged 31)	31	(Wales) Cardiff Blues
Willis Halaholo	Centre	6 July 1990 (aged 30)	0	(Wales) Cardiff Blues
