= 2021 Six Nations Championship =

Rugby union competition in Europe

- Date: 6 February – 26 March 2021
- Countries: England; France; Ireland; Italy; Scotland; Wales

Tournament statistics
- Champions: Wales (28th title)
- Triple Crown: Wales (22nd title)
- Matches played: 15
- Attendance: 0 (0 per match)
- Tries scored: 86 (5.73 per match)
- Top point scorer: (Ireland) Johnny Sexton (65 points)
- Top try scorer: (Scotland) Duhan van der Merwe (5 tries)
- Player of the tournament: (Scotland) Hamish Watson

The 2021 Six Nations Championship (known as the Guinness Six Nations for sponsorship reasons) was the 22nd Six Nations Championship, the annual rugby union competition contested by the national teams of England, France, Ireland, Italy, Scotland, and Wales, and the 127th edition of the competition (including all its previous incarnations as the Home Nations Championship and Five Nations Championship). Due to the COVID-19 pandemic, the tournament started just three months after the end of the previous tournament and all matches took place without spectators.

England began the tournament as defending champions, having won the 2020 tournament on points difference, but only managed two wins in this tournament and finished fifth, ahead of only Italy. Wales, having finished fifth in 2020, entered the final weekend with four wins out of four and the possibility of a Grand Slam, but were beaten 32–30 by France in Saint-Denis following a late try.

France's third match, against Scotland, had to be rescheduled after an outbreak of COVID-19 in the French camp; the match was moved to the Friday night following the final round of matches, with France needing to win by at least 21 points with a try-scoring bonus point to overtake Wales at the top of the table. They led by three points going into the final minute, only for Scotland to score a try that gave them the win and Wales the title.

== Participants ==
Nation	Stadium			Head coach	Captain
Nation	Home stadium	Capacity	Location	Head coach	Captain
England	Twickenham Stadium	82,000	London	(Australia) Eddie Jones	Owen Farrell
France	Stade de France	81,338	Saint-Denis	(France) Fabien Galthié	Charles Ollivon
Ireland	Aviva Stadium	51,700	Dublin	(England) Andy Farrell	Johnny Sexton
Italy	Stadio Olimpico	73,261	Rome	(South Africa) Franco Smith	Luca Bigi
Scotland	Murrayfield Stadium	67,144	Edinburgh	(Scotland) Gregor Townsend	Stuart Hogg
Wales	Millennium Stadium	73,931	Cardiff	(New Zealand) Wayne Pivac	Alun Wyn Jones

== Table ==
Pos	Team	Pld	W	D	L	PF	PA	PD	TF	TA	GS	TB	LB	Pts	WAL	FRA	IRE	SCO	ENG	ITA
1	Wales	5	4	0	1	164	103	+61	20	11	0	3	1	20	—		21–16		40–24	
2	France	5	3	0	2	140	103	+37	18	10	0	2	2	16	32–30	—		23–27		
3	Ireland	5	3	0	2	136	88	+48	12	10	0	1	2	15		13–15	—		32–18	
4	Scotland	5	3	0	2	138	91	+47	18	10	0	1	2	15	24–25		24–27	—		52–10
5	England	5	2	0	3	112	121	−9	12	11	0	1	1	10		23–20		6–11	—	41–18
6	Italy	5	0	0	5	55	239	−184	6	34	0	0	0	0	7–48	10–50	10–48			—

Source: ESPN
Legend: Blue = home team win; Yellow = draw; Red = away team win.

Table ranking rules

- Four points are awarded for a win.
- Two points are awarded for a draw.
- Bonus points are awarded to any team that scores four or more tries in a match and/or loses by seven points or fewer.
- Three bonus points are awarded to a team that wins all five of their matches (a Grand Slam). This ensures that a team that wins a Grand Slam tops the table with at least 23 points, as another team could lose one match while winning two bonus points and win the other four matches while winning four bonus points for a maximum of 22 points.
- Tiebreakers
  - If two or more teams are tied on table points, the team with the better points difference (points scored less points conceded) is ranked higher.
  - If the above tiebreaker fails to separate tied teams, the team that scores the higher number of total tries (including penalty tries) in their matches is ranked higher.
  - If two or more teams remain tied after applying the above tiebreakers then those teams will be placed at equal rank; if the tournament has concluded and more than one team is placed first then the title will be shared between them.

== Fixtures ==
The fixtures were announced on 20 March 2019. As with 2020, no matches were scheduled on a Friday night (Note: The postponed round 3 match between France and Scotland was ultimately played on a Friday.) and the final match of the tournament was scheduled for peak time.

=== Round 1 ===
6 February 2021
15:15 CET (UTC+1)

Italy	10–50	France (1 BP)
Try: Sperandio 65' c Con: Garbisi (1/1) 66'; Pen: Garbisi (1/1) 19'	Report; Match data	Try: Cretin 6' c Fickou 27' c Vincent 30' c Dulin 49' c Dupont 53' c Thomas (2) 57' c, 74' m Con: Jalibert (6/6) 7', 28', 31', 51', 54', 58'; Pen: Jalibert (1/1) 11'

Stadio Olimpico, Rome
Attendance: 0
Referee: Matthew Carley (England)

FB	15	Jacopo Trulla
RW	14	Luca Sperandio
OC	13	Marco Zanon			(substituted off) 44'
IC	12	Ignacio Brex
LW	11	Monty Ioane
FH	10	Paolo Garbisi	(substituted off) 36'	(substituted on) 41'
SH	9	Stephen Varney
N8	8	Michele Lamaro
OF	7	Johan Meyer	(substituted off) 51'
BF	6	Sebastian Negri	(substituted off) 59'
RL	5	David Sisi	(substituted off) 59'
LL	4	Marco Lazzaroni
TP	3	Marco Riccioni	(substituted off) 31'
HK	2	Luca Bigi (c)	(substituted off) 59'
LP	1	Daniele Rimpelli	(substituted off) 31'
Replacements:
HK	16	Gianmarco Lucchesi	(substituted on) 59'
PR	17	Danilo Fischetti	(substituted on) 31'
PR	18	Giosuè Zilocchi	(substituted on) 31'
LK	19	Niccolò Cannone	(substituted on) 59'
LK	20	Federico Ruzza	(substituted on) 59'
FL	21	Maxime Mbanda	(substituted on) 51'	(substituted off) 74'
SH	22	Guglielmo Palazzani		(substituted on) 74'
FH	23	Carlo Canna	(substituted on) 36'	(substituted off) 41'	(substituted on) 44'
Coach:
Franco Smith

FB	15	Brice Dulin
RW	14	Teddy Thomas
OC	13	Arthur Vincent
IC	12	Gaël Fickou	(substituted off) 59'
LW	11	Gabin Villière
FH	10	Matthieu Jalibert	(substituted off) 59'
SH	9	Antoine Dupont	(substituted off) 59'
N8	8	Grégory Alldritt	(substituted off) 58'
OF	7	Charles Ollivon (c)
BF	6	Dylan Cretin
RL	5	Paul Willemse	(substituted off) 58'
LL	4	Bernard Le Roux
TP	3	Mohamed Haouas	(substituted off) 53'
HK	2	Julien Marchand	(substituted off) 46'
LP	1	Cyril Baille	(substituted off) 53'
Replacements:
HK	16	Pierre Bourgarit	(substituted on) 46'
PR	17	Jean-Baptiste Gros	(substituted on) 53'
PR	18	Dorian Aldegheri	(substituted on) 53'
LK	19	Romain Taofifénua	(substituted on) 58'
FL	20	Anthony Jelonch	(substituted on) 58'
SH	21	Baptiste Serin	(substituted on) 59'
FH	22	Louis Carbonel	(substituted on) 59'
WG	23	Damian Penaud	(substituted on) 59'
Coach:
Fabien Galthié

Player of the Match:
Antoine Dupont (France)

Touch judges:
Mike Adamson (Scotland)
Christophe Ridley (England)
Television match official:
Karl Dickson (England)

Notes:

- Ignacio Brex and Daniele Rimpelli (both Italy) made their international debuts.
- Cherif Traorè was originally due to start, but was replaced by Daniele Rimpelli after being injured in the warm-up.
- France retained the Giuseppe Garibaldi Trophy.

6 February 2021
16:45 GMT (UTC+0)

(1 BP) England	6–11	Scotland
Pen: Farrell (2/2) 34', 39'	Report; Match data	Try: Van der Merwe 30' m Pen: Russell (2/3) 6', 49'

Twickenham Stadium, London
Attendance: 0
Referee: Andrew Brace (Ireland)

FB	15	Elliot Daly
RW	14	Anthony Watson		(substituted off) 76'
OC	13	Henry Slade
IC	12	Ollie Lawrence		(substituted off) 69'
LW	11	Jonny May
FH	10	Owen Farrell (c)
SH	9	Ben Youngs		(substituted off) 56'
N8	8	Billy Vunipola	(yellow card) 24'	(substituted off) 67'
OF	7	Tom Curry
BF	6	Mark Wilson		(substituted off) 53'
RL	5	Jonny Hill
LL	4	Maro Itoje
TP	3	Will Stuart		(substituted off) 62'
HK	2	Jamie George		(substituted off) 56'
LP	1	Ellis Genge		(substituted off) 72'
Replacements:
HK	16	Luke Cowan-Dickie		(substituted on) 56'
PR	17	Beno Obano		(substituted on) 72'
PR	18	Harry Williams		(substituted on) 62'
LK	19	Courtney Lawes		(substituted on) 53'
FL	20	Ben Earl		(substituted on) 67'
SH	21	Dan Robson		(substituted on) 56'
FH	22	George Ford		(substituted on) 69'
FB	23	Max Malins		(substituted on) 76'
Coach:
Eddie Jones

FB	15	Stuart Hogg (c)
RW	14	Sean Maitland		(substituted off) 72'
OC	13	Chris Harris
IC	12	Cameron Redpath
LW	11	Duhan van der Merwe
FH	10	Finn Russell	(yellow card) 38'
SH	9	Ali Price		(substituted off) 69'
N8	8	Matt Fagerson		(substituted off) 64'
OF	7	Hamish Watson
BF	6	Jamie Ritchie		(substituted off) 66'
RL	5	Jonny Gray
LL	4	Scott Cummings
TP	3	Zander Fagerson		(substituted off) 64'
HK	2	George Turner		(substituted off) 67'
LP	1	Rory Sutherland		(substituted off) 64'
Replacements:
HK	16	Dave Cherry		(substituted on) 67'
PR	17	Oli Kebble		(substituted on) 64'
PR	18	WP Nel		(substituted on) 64'
LK	19	Richie Gray		(substituted on) 66'
N8	20	Gary Graham		(substituted on) 64'
SH	21	Scott Steele		(substituted on) 69'
FH	22	Jaco van der Walt
CE	23	Huw Jones		(substituted on) 72'
Coach:
Gregor Townsend

Player of the Match:
Stuart Hogg (Scotland)

Touch judges:
Pascal Gaüzère (France)
Mathieu Raynal (France)
Television match official:
Joy Neville (Ireland)

Notes:

- Beno Obano (England), Dave Cherry and Cameron Redpath (both Scotland) made their international debuts.
- Scotland won the Calcutta Cup.
- Scotland won at Twickenham for the first time since 1983.
- Joy Neville became the first woman to perform television match official duties in the men's Six Nations.

7 February 2021
15:00 GMT (UTC+0)

Wales	21–16	Ireland (1 BP)
Try: North 49' m Rees-Zammit 59' c Con: Halfpenny (1/2) 60'; Pen: Halfpenny (3/3) 5', 19', 66'	Report; Match data	Try: Beirne 37' c Con: Sexton (1/1) 39'; Pen: Sexton (2/2) 29', 35'; Burns (1/1) 72'

Millennium Stadium, Cardiff
Attendance: 0
Referee: Wayne Barnes (England)

FB	15	Leigh Halfpenny
RW	14	Louis Rees-Zammit
OC	13	George North
IC	12	Johnny Williams	(substituted off) 24'
LW	11	Hallam Amos	(substituted off) 66'
FH	10	Dan Biggar
SH	9	Tomos Williams	(substituted off) 41'
N8	8	Taulupe Faletau
OF	7	Justin Tipuric
BF	6	Dan Lydiate	(substituted off) 13'
RL	5	Alun Wyn Jones (c)
LL	4	Adam Beard	(substituted off) 66'
TP	3	Tomas Francis	(substituted off) 66'
HK	2	Ken Owens
LP	1	Wyn Jones	(substituted off) 66'
Replacements:
HK	16	Elliot Dee
PR	17	Rhodri Jones	(substituted on) 66'
PR	18	Leon Brown	(substituted on) 66'
LK	19	Will Rowlands	(substituted on) 66'
FL	20	Josh Navidi	(substituted on) 13'
SH	21	Gareth Davies	(substituted on) 41'
FH	22	Callum Sheedy	(substituted on) 66'
CE	23	Nick Tompkins	(substituted on) 24'
Coach:
Wayne Pivac

FB	15	Hugo Keenan
RW	14	Keith Earls		(substituted off) 62'
OC	13	Garry Ringrose
IC	12	Robbie Henshaw		(substituted off) 54'	(substituted on) 64'
LW	11	James Lowe
FH	10	Johnny Sexton (c)				(substituted off) 70'
SH	9	Conor Murray		(substituted off) 73'
N8	8	CJ Stander
OF	7	Josh van der Flier		(substituted off) 60'
BF	6	Peter O'Mahony	(red card) 14'
RL	5	James Ryan		(substituted off) 24'
LL	4	Tadhg Beirne
TP	3	Andrew Porter		(substituted off) 54'
HK	2	Rob Herring		(substituted off) 73'
LP	1	Cian Healy		(substituted off) 52'
Replacements:
HK	16	Rónan Kelleher		(substituted on) 73'
PR	17	Dave Kilcoyne		(substituted on) 52'
PR	18	Tadhg Furlong		(substituted on) 54'
LK	19	Iain Henderson		(substituted on) 24'
FL	20	Will Connors		(substituted on) 60'
SH	21	Jamison Gibson-Park		(substituted on) 73'
FH	22	Billy Burns		(substituted on) 54'	(substituted off) 64'	(substituted on) 70'
WG	23	Jordan Larmour		(substituted on) 62'
Coach:
Andy Farrell

Player of the Match:
Wyn Jones (Wales)

Touch judges:
Luke Pearce (England)
Alexandre Ruiz (France)
Television match official:
Tom Foley (England)

Notes:

- Peter O'Mahony became the first Ireland player to receive a red card in a Six Nations match.

=== Round 2 ===
13 February 2021
14:15 GMT (UTC+0)

(1 BP) England	41–18	Italy
Try: Hill 14' m Watson (2) 26' c, 50' c May 40' m Willis 61' c Daly 68' c Con: Farrell (4/6) 27', 50', 62', 69'; Pen: Farrell (1/1) 9'	Report; Match data	Try: Ioane 3' m Allan 66' c Con: Allan (1/1) 67'; Pen: Garbisi (2/2) 20', 44'

Twickenham Stadium, London
Attendance: 0
Referee: Mike Adamson (Scotland)

FB	15	Elliot Daly
RW	14	Anthony Watson
OC	13	Henry Slade
IC	12	Owen Farrell (c)
LW	11	Jonny May
FH	10	George Ford
SH	9	Ben Youngs	(substituted off) 51'
N8	8	Billy Vunipola	(substituted off) 59'
OF	7	Tom Curry
BF	6	Courtney Lawes	(substituted off) 59'
RL	5	Jonny Hill	(substituted off) 51'
LL	4	Maro Itoje
TP	3	Kyle Sinckler	(substituted off) 74'
HK	2	Luke Cowan-Dickie	(substituted off) 52'
LP	1	Mako Vunipola	(substituted off) 52'
Replacements:
HK	16	Jamie George	(substituted on) 52'
PR	17	Ellis Genge	(substituted on) 52'
PR	18	Will Stuart	(substituted on) 74'
LK	19	Charlie Ewels	(substituted on) 51'
FL	20	Ben Earl	(substituted on) 59'
FL	21	Jack Willis	(substituted on) 59'	(substituted off) 65'
SH	22	Dan Robson	(substituted on) 51'
FB	23	Max Malins		(substituted on) 65'
Coach:
Eddie Jones

FB	15	Jacopo Trulla
RW	14	Luca Sperandio
OC	13	Ignacio Brex		(substituted off) 59'
IC	12	Carlo Canna	51' to 59'
LW	11	Monty Ioane
FH	10	Paolo Garbisi	(substituted off) 65'
SH	9	Stephen Varney	(substituted off) 70'
N8	8	Michele Lamaro	(substituted off) 45'
OF	7	Johan Meyer
BF	6	Sebastian Negri	25' to 31'
RL	5	David Sisi			(substituted off) 79'
LL	4	Marco Lazzaroni
TP	3	Marco Riccioni	16' to 25'		(substituted off) 41'
HK	2	Luca Bigi (c)	(substituted off) 69'
LP	1	Andrea Lovotti	(substituted off) 31'	(substituted on) 54'
Replacements:
HK	16	Gianmarco Lucchesi	(substituted on) 69'
PR	17	Danilo Fischetti	(substituted on) 31'	(substituted off) 54'
PR	18	Giosuè Zilocchi	(substituted on) 16'	(substituted off) 25'	(substituted on) 41'
LK	19	Niccolò Cannone	(substituted on) 45'
LK	20	Federico Ruzza	(substituted on) 25'	(substituted off) 31'	(substituted on) 79'
SH	21	Guglielmo Palazzani	(substituted on) 70'
FH	22	Tommaso Allan	(substituted on) 65'
CE	23	Federico Mori	(substituted on) 51'
Coach:
Franco Smith

Player of the Match:
Kyle Sinckler (England)

Touch judges:
Romain Poite (France)
Ben Blain (Scotland)
Television match official:
Joy Neville (Ireland)

Notes:

- Mike Adamson became the first Scottish referee to officiate a Six Nations match since Rob Dickson in 2002.

13 February 2021
16:45 GMT (UTC+0)

(1 BP) Scotland	24–25	Wales (1 BP)
Try: Graham 18' c Hogg (2) 25' c, 65' c Con: Russell (3/3) 19', 26', 66'; Pen: Russell (1/1) 11'	Report; Match data	Try: Rees-Zammit (2) 38' m, 70' m Williams 51' c W. Jones 55' m Con: Sheedy (1/3) 52'; Pen: Halfpenny (1/1) 8'

Murrayfield Stadium, Edinburgh
Attendance: 0
Referee: Matthew Carley (England)

FB	15	Stuart Hogg (c)
RW	14	Darcy Graham		(substituted off) 57'
OC	13	Chris Harris
IC	12	James Lang		(substituted off) 71'
LW	11	Duhan van der Merwe
FH	10	Finn Russell
SH	9	Ali Price
N8	8	Matt Fagerson
OF	7	Hamish Watson
BF	6	Blade Thomson		(substituted off) 13'
RL	5	Jonny Gray
LL	4	Scott Cummings
TP	3	Zander Fagerson	(red card) 54'
HK	2	George Turner		(substituted off) 69'
LP	1	Rory Sutherland		(substituted off) 69'
Replacements:
HK	16	Dave Cherry		(substituted on) 69'
PR	17	Oli Kebble		(substituted on) 69'
PR	18	WP Nel		(substituted on) 57'
LK	19	Richie Gray			(substituted on) 56'
N8	20	Gary Graham		(substituted on) 13'	(substituted off) 56'
SH	21	Scott Steele
FH	22	Jaco van der Walt
CE	23	Huw Jones		(substituted on) 71'
Coach:
Gregor Townsend

FB	15	Leigh Halfpenny	(substituted off) 33'
RW	14	Louis Rees-Zammit
OC	13	Owen Watkin
IC	12	Nick Tompkins
LW	11	Liam Williams
FH	10	Dan Biggar	(substituted off) 49'
SH	9	Gareth Davies	(substituted off) 49'
N8	8	Taulupe Faletau
OF	7	Justin Tipuric
BF	6	Aaron Wainwright	(substituted off) 63'
RL	5	Alun Wyn Jones (c)	(substituted off) 71'
LL	4	Adam Beard
TP	3	Tomas Francis	(substituted off) 63'
HK	2	Ken Owens	(substituted off) 71'
LP	1	Wyn Jones	(substituted off) 78'
Replacements:
HK	16	Elliot Dee	(substituted on) 71'
PR	17	Rhodri Jones	(substituted on) 78'
PR	18	Leon Brown	(substituted on) 63'
LK	19	Will Rowlands	(substituted on) 71'
FL	20	James Botham	(substituted on) 63'
SH	21	Kieran Hardy	(substituted on) 49'
FH	22	Callum Sheedy	(substituted on) 49'
CE	23	Willis Halaholo	(substituted on) 33'
Coach:
Wayne Pivac

Player of the Match:
Louis Rees-Zammit (Wales)

Touch judges:
Pascal Gaüzère (France)
Andrea Piardi (Italy)
Television match official:
Karl Dickson (England)

Notes:

- Willis Halaholo (Wales) made his international debut.
- Wales reclaimed the Doddie Weir Cup.

14 February 2021
15:00 GMT (UTC+0)

(1 BP) Ireland	13–15	France
Try: Kelleher 57' c Con: R. Byrne (1/1) 58'; Pen: Burns (1/2) 21'; R. Byrne (1/1) 65'	Report; Match data	Try: Ollivon 29' c Penaud 55' m Con: Jalibert (1/2) 31'; Pen: Jalibert (1/3) 39'

Aviva Stadium, Dublin
Attendance: 0
Referee: Luke Pearce (England)

FB	15	Hugo Keenan
RW	14	Keith Earls	(substituted off) 68'
OC	13	Garry Ringrose
IC	12	Robbie Henshaw
LW	11	James Lowe
FH	10	Billy Burns	(substituted off) 42'
SH	9	Jamison Gibson-Park
N8	8	CJ Stander
OF	7	Josh van der Flier	(substituted off) 65'
BF	6	Rhys Ruddock
RL	5	Iain Henderson (c)	(substituted off) 42'	(substituted on) 59'
LL	4	Tadhg Beirne			(substituted off) 73'
TP	3	Andrew Porter	(substituted off) 53'
HK	2	Rob Herring	(substituted off) 54'
LP	1	Cian Healy	(substituted off) 42'	(substituted on) 57'	(substituted off) 70'
Replacements:
HK	16	Rónan Kelleher	(substituted on) 54'
PR	17	Ed Byrne	(substituted on) 42'	(substituted off) 57'	(substituted on) 70'
PR	18	Tadhg Furlong	(substituted on) 53'
LK	19	Ultan Dillane	(substituted on) 42'	(substituted off) 59'	(substituted on) 73'
FL	20	Will Connors	(substituted on) 65'
SH	21	Craig Casey
FH	22	Ross Byrne	(substituted on) 42'
WG	23	Jordan Larmour	(substituted on) 68'
Coach:
Andy Farrell

FB	15	Brice Dulin
RW	14	Damian Penaud		(substituted off) 67'
OC	13	Arthur Vincent
IC	12	Gaël Fickou
LW	11	Gabin Villière
FH	10	Matthieu Jalibert
SH	9	Antoine Dupont
N8	8	Grégory Alldritt
OF	7	Charles Ollivon (c)
BF	6	Anthony Jelonch		(substituted off) 67'
RL	5	Paul Willemse		(substituted off) 70'
LL	4	Bernard Le Roux	(yellow card) 24'
TP	3	Mohamed Haouas		(substituted off) 56'
HK	2	Julien Marchand		(substituted off) 76'
LP	1	Cyril Baille		(substituted off) 76'
Replacements:
HK	16	Pierre Bourgarit		(substituted on) 76'
PR	17	Hassane Kolingar		(substituted on) 76'
PR	18	Uini Atonio		(substituted on) 56'
LK	19	Romain Taofifénua		(substituted on) 70'
FL	20	Dylan Cretin		(substituted on) 67'
SH	21	Baptiste Serin
FB	22	Anthony Bouthier
WG	23	Teddy Thomas		(substituted on) 67'
Coach:
Fabien Galthié

Player of the Match:
Brice Dulin (France)

Touch judges:
Wayne Barnes (England)
Christophe Ridley (England)
Television match official:
Tom Foley (England)

Notes:

- This was the 100th meeting between Ireland and France.
- Ireland lost successive games at the start of a Six Nations campaign for the first time.

=== Round 3 ===
27 February 2021
15:15 CET (UTC+1)

Italy	10–48	Ireland (1 BP)
Try: Meyer 40' c Con: Garbisi (1/1) 40'; Pen: Garbisi (1/1) 4'	Report; Match data	Try: Ringrose 11' c Keenan 31' c Connors (2) 36' c, 66' c Stander 43' c Earls 80' c Con: Sexton (6/6) 12', 33', 37', 44', 67', 80'; Pen: Sexton (2/2) 6', 18'

Stadio Olimpico, Rome
Attendance: 0
Referee: Mathieu Raynal (France)

FB	15	Jacopo Trulla
RW	14	Luca Sperandio		(substituted off) 41'
OC	13	Ignacio Brex		(substituted off) 67'
IC	12	Carlo Canna
LW	11	Monty Ioane			(substituted off) 60'	(substituted on) 75'
FH	10	Paolo Garbisi
SH	9	Callum Braley		(substituted off) 78'
N8	8	Michele Lamaro
OF	7	Johan Meyer
BF	6	Sebastian Negri		(substituted off) 75'
RL	5	David Sisi
LL	4	Marco Lazzaroni		(substituted off) 44'
TP	3	Marco Riccioni		(substituted off) 44'	(substituted on) 60'	(substituted off) 70'
HK	2	Luca Bigi (c)	(yellow card) 65'			(substituted off) 75'
LP	1	Andrea Lovotti		(substituted off) 44'	(substituted on) 69'
Replacements:
HK	16	Gianmarco Lucchesi				(substituted on) 70'
PR	17	Cherif Traorè		(substituted on) 44'	(substituted off) 69'
PR	18	Giosuè Zilocchi	(yellow card) 59'	(substituted on) 44'
LK	19	Niccolò Cannone		(substituted on) 44'
FL	20	Maxime Mbanda		(substituted on) 75'
SH	21	Guglielmo Palazzani		(substituted on) 78'
CE	22	Federico Mori		(substituted on) 67'
WG	23	Mattia Bellini		(substituted on) 41'
Coach:
Franco Smith

FB	15	Hugo Keenan
RW	14	Jordan Larmour	(substituted off) 41'
OC	13	Garry Ringrose
IC	12	Robbie Henshaw	(substituted off) 71'
LW	11	James Lowe
FH	10	Johnny Sexton (c)
SH	9	Jamison Gibson-Park	(substituted off) 63'
N8	8	CJ Stander	(substituted off) 63'
OF	7	Will Connors
BF	6	Tadhg Beirne
RL	5	James Ryan
LL	4	Iain Henderson	(substituted off) 63'
TP	3	Tadhg Furlong	(substituted off) 47'
HK	2	Rónan Kelleher	(substituted off) 63'
LP	1	Dave Kilcoyne	(substituted off) 47'
Replacements:
HK	16	Rob Herring	(substituted on) 63'
PR	17	Cian Healy	(substituted on) 47'
PR	18	Andrew Porter	(substituted on) 47'
LK	19	Ryan Baird	(substituted on) 63'
N8	20	Jack Conan	(substituted on) 63'
SH	21	Craig Casey	(substituted on) 63'
FH	22	Billy Burns	(substituted on) 71'
WG	23	Keith Earls	(substituted on) 41'
Coach:
Andy Farrell

Player of the Match:
Tadhg Beirne (Ireland)

Touch judges:
Mike Adamson (Scotland)
Craig Evans (Wales)
Television match official:
Romain Poite (France)

Notes:

- Carlo Canna (Italy) and Robbie Henshaw (Ireland) earned their 50th test caps.
- Ryan Baird and Craig Casey (both Ireland) made their international debuts.
- Andy Farrell named an all-Leinster starting backline, the first time this has happened since 1931 and only the third time in history.
- Stephen Varney had been named to start, but was injured in the warm-up and Callum Braley started in his place, with Guglielmo Palazzani coming onto the bench.

27 February 2021
16:45 GMT (UTC+0)

(1 BP) Wales	40–24	England
Try: Adams 16' c Williams 30' c Hardy 48' c Hill 79' c Con: Biggar (2/2) 17', 31'; Sheedy (2/2) 50', 80'; Pen: Biggar (1/1) 6'; Sheedy (3/3) 67', 70', 75'	Report; Match data	Try: Watson 36' m Youngs 62' c Con: Farrell (1/2) 63'; Pen: Farrell (4/5) 12', 20', 40', 53'

Millennium Stadium, Cardiff
Attendance: 0
Referee: Pascal Gaüzère (France)

FB	15	Liam Williams
RW	14	Louis Rees-Zammit
OC	13	George North
IC	12	Jonathan Davies	(substituted off) 50'
LW	11	Josh Adams
FH	10	Dan Biggar	(substituted off) 45'
SH	9	Kieran Hardy	(substituted off) 65'
N8	8	Taulupe Faletau
OF	7	Justin Tipuric
BF	6	Josh Navidi	(substituted off) 70'
RL	5	Alun Wyn Jones (c)
LL	4	Adam Beard	(substituted off) 56'
TP	3	Tomas Francis	(substituted off) 67'
HK	2	Ken Owens	(substituted off) 63'
LP	1	Wyn Jones	(substituted off) 63'
Replacements:
HK	16	Elliot Dee	(substituted on) 63'
PR	17	Rhodri Jones	(substituted on) 63'
PR	18	Leon Brown	(substituted on) 67'
LK	19	Cory Hill	(substituted on) 56'
FL	20	James Botham	(substituted on) 70'
SH	21	Gareth Davies	(substituted on) 65'
FH	22	Callum Sheedy	(substituted on) 45'
CE	23	Willis Halaholo	(substituted on) 50'
Coach:
Wayne Pivac

FB	15	Elliot Daly	(substituted off) 75'
RW	14	Anthony Watson
OC	13	Henry Slade
IC	12	Owen Farrell (c)
LW	11	Jonny May
FH	10	George Ford
SH	9	Ben Youngs	(substituted off) 70'
N8	8	Billy Vunipola
OF	7	Tom Curry
BF	6	Mark Wilson	(substituted off) 71'
RL	5	Jonny Hill	(substituted off) 58'
LL	4	Maro Itoje
TP	3	Kyle Sinckler
HK	2	Jamie George	(substituted off) 61'
LP	1	Mako Vunipola	(substituted off) 67'
Replacements:
HK	16	Luke Cowan-Dickie	(substituted on) 61'
PR	17	Ellis Genge	(substituted on) 67'
PR	18	Will Stuart
LK	19	Charlie Ewels	(substituted on) 58'
FL	20	George Martin
FL	21	Ben Earl	(substituted on) 71'
SH	22	Dan Robson	(substituted on) 70'
FB	23	Max Malins	(substituted on) 75'
Coach:
Eddie Jones

Player of the Match:
Taulupe Faletau (Wales)

Touch judges:
Andrew Brace (Ireland)
Frank Murphy (Ireland)
Television match official:
Alexandre Ruiz (France)

Notes:

- George North (Wales) – at the age of 28 and 320 days – became the youngest player to earn 100 caps for his country, surpassing Australia's Michael Hooper by 28 days.
- Elliot Daly (England) earned his 50th test cap.
- Owen Farrell scored his 1,000th point for England.
- Wales' 40 points scored were the most they had ever scored against England, surpassing the 34 points scored in 1967.
- Wales recorded a bonus point victory over England for the first time since the bonus-point system was introduced in 2017.
- Wales won the Triple Crown for the 22nd time.

28 February 2021
16:00 CET (UTC+1)

France	Postponed (Note: Postponed to 26 March 2021 due to a number of positive COVID-19, tests in the France camp.)	Scotland

Stade de France, Saint-Denis
Referee: Wayne Barnes (England)

=== Round 4 ===
13 March 2021
15:15 CET (UTC+1)

Italy	7–48	Wales (1 BP)
Try: Ioane 51' c Con: Garbisi (1/1) 52'	Report; Match data	Try: Adams 8' c Faletau 14' m Owens (2) 21' c, 30' m North 42' c Sheedy 60' c Rees-Zammit 64' c Con: Biggar (3/5) 9', 22', 43'; Sheedy (2/2) 61', 65'; Pen: Biggar (1/1) 3'

Stadio Olimpico, Rome
Attendance: 0
Referee: Wayne Barnes (England) (Note: Andrew Brace was originally appointed to this fixture, but was moved to officiate the England v France game with Jaco Peyper unable to travel due to travel restrictions.)

FB	15	Jacopo Trulla		(substituted off) 36'
RW	14	Mattia Bellini
OC	13	Ignacio Brex
IC	12	Carlo Canna
LW	11	Monty Ioane		(substituted off) 7'	(substituted on) 18'	(substituted off) 66'	(substituted on) 68'
FH	10	Paolo Garbisi		(substituted off) 54'
SH	9	Stephen Varney		(substituted off) 63'
N8	8	Michele Lamaro
OF	7	Johan Meyer		(substituted off) 18'	(substituted on) 36'
BF	6	Sebastian Negri
RL	5	David Sisi
LL	4	Niccolò Cannone		(substituted off) 52'
TP	3	Giosuè Zilocchi		(substituted off) 26'		(substituted on) 66'	(substituted off) 68'
HK	2	Luca Bigi (c)	(yellow card) 7'
LP	1	Danilo Fischetti		(substituted off) 65'
Replacements:
HK	16	Oliviero Fabiani		(substituted on) 7'	(substituted off) 18'
PR	17	Andrea Lovotti		(substituted on) 65'
PR	18	Marco Riccioni	(yellow card) 57'	(substituted on) 33'
LK	19	Marco Lazzaroni		(substituted on) 52'		(substituted off) 63'
FL	20	Maxime Mbanda		(substituted on) 26'	(substituted off) 33'	(substituted on) 63'
SH	21	Marcello Violi		(substituted on) 63'
CE	22	Federico Mori		(substituted on) 54'
FB	23	Edoardo Padovani		(substituted on) 43'
Coach:
Franco Smith

FB	15	Liam Williams
RW	14	Louis Rees-Zammit
OC	13	George North	(substituted off) 46'
IC	12	Jonathan Davies
LW	11	Josh Adams
FH	10	Dan Biggar	(substituted off) 52'
SH	9	Gareth Davies	(substituted off) 52'
N8	8	Taulupe Faletau	(substituted off) 52'
OF	7	Justin Tipuric
BF	6	Josh Navidi
RL	5	Alun Wyn Jones (c)	(substituted off) 54'
LL	4	Cory Hill
TP	3	Tomas Francis	(substituted off) 45'
HK	2	Ken Owens	(substituted off) 54'
LP	1	Wyn Jones	(substituted off) 57'
Replacements:
HK	16	Elliot Dee	(substituted on) 54'
PR	17	Rhys Carré	(substituted on) 57'
PR	18	Leon Brown	(substituted on) 45'
LK	19	Jake Ball	(substituted on) 54'
FL	20	Aaron Wainwright	(substituted on) 52'
SH	21	Lloyd Williams	(substituted on) 52'
FH	22	Callum Sheedy	(substituted on) 52'
CE	23	Willis Halaholo	(substituted on) 46'
Coach:
Wayne Pivac

Player of the Match:
Josh Navidi (Wales)

Touch judges:
Pascal Gaüzère (France)
Christophe Ridley (England)
Television match official:
Tom Foley (England)

Notes:

- Jake Ball (Wales) earned his 50th test cap.
- George North scored a try in his sixth consecutive Six Nations game against Italy, the best run for a player against a single team in the tournament.
- Ken Owens was the first hooker to score two or more tries in a Six Nations game since Shane Byrne scored two against Wales for Ireland in 2004.

13 March 2021
16:45 GMT (UTC+0)

England	23–20	France (1 BP)
Try: Watson 10' c Itoje 76' c Con: Farrell (2/2) 12', 78'; Pen: Farrell (3/3) 15', 20', 54'	Report; Match data	Try: Dupont 2' c Penaud 32' c Con: Jalibert (2/2) 3', 33'; Pen: Jalibert (2/2) 29', 50'

Twickenham Stadium, London
Attendance: 0
Referee: Andrew Brace (Ireland) (Note: Andrew Brace replaces Jaco Peyper, who was unable to travel due to travel restrictions.)

FB	15	Max Malins	(substituted off) 63'
RW	14	Anthony Watson
OC	13	Henry Slade	(substituted off) 72'
IC	12	Owen Farrell (c)
LW	11	Jonny May
FH	10	George Ford
SH	9	Ben Youngs	(substituted off) 76'
N8	8	Billy Vunipola
OF	7	Tom Curry
BF	6	Mark Wilson	(substituted off) 63'
RL	5	Charlie Ewels	(substituted off) 78'
LL	4	Maro Itoje
TP	3	Kyle Sinckler	(substituted off) 72'
HK	2	Luke Cowan-Dickie	(substituted off) 72'
LP	1	Mako Vunipola	(substituted off) 63'
Replacements:
HK	16	Jamie George	(substituted on) 72'
PR	17	Ellis Genge	(substituted on) 63'
PR	18	Will Stuart	(substituted on) 72'
LK	19	Jonny Hill	(substituted on) 78'
FL	20	Ben Earl	(substituted on) 63'
SH	21	Dan Robson	(substituted on) 76'
CE	22	Ollie Lawrence	(substituted on) 72'
FB	23	Elliot Daly	(substituted on) 63'
Coach:
Eddie Jones

FB	15	Brice Dulin
RW	14	Teddy Thomas
OC	13	Virimi Vakatawa
IC	12	Gaël Fickou
LW	11	Damian Penaud
FH	10	Matthieu Jalibert
SH	9	Antoine Dupont
N8	8	Grégory Alldritt
OF	7	Charles Ollivon (c)
BF	6	Dylan Cretin	(substituted off) 72'
RL	5	Paul Willemse
LL	4	Romain Taofifénua	(substituted off) 59'
TP	3	Mohamed Haouas	(substituted off) 59'
HK	2	Julien Marchand	(substituted off) 72'
LP	1	Cyril Baille	(substituted off) 68'
Replacements:
HK	16	Camille Chat	(substituted on) 72'
PR	17	Jean-Baptiste Gros	(substituted on) 68'
PR	18	Dorian Aldegheri	(substituted on) 59'
LK	19	Cyril Cazeaux	(substituted on) 59'
FL	20	Cameron Woki	(substituted on) 72'
FL	21	Anthony Jelonch
SH	22	Baptiste Serin
FH	23	Romain Ntamack
Coach:
Fabien Galthié

Player of the Match:
Anthony Watson (England)

Touch judges:
Mike Adamson (Scotland)
Craig Evans (Wales)
Television match official:
Joy Neville (Ireland)

Notes:

- Anthony Watson (England) earned his 50th test cap.

14 March 2021
15:00 GMT (UTC+0)

(1 BP) Scotland	24–27	Ireland
Try: Russell 28' c Jones 60' c Watson 74' c Con: Russell (1/1) 28'; Hogg (2/2) 61', 74'; Pen: Russell (1/2) 12'	Report; Match data	Try: Henshaw 8' m Beirne 49' c Con: Sexton (1/2) 50'; Pen: Sexton (5/5) 4', 35', 40', 55', 77'

Murrayfield Stadium, Edinburgh
Attendance: 0
Referee: Romain Poite (France)

FB	15	Stuart Hogg (c)
RW	14	Sean Maitland
OC	13	Chris Harris	(substituted off) 55'
IC	12	Sam Johnson
LW	11	Duhan van der Merwe
FH	10	Finn Russell	(substituted off) 63'
SH	9	Ali Price
N8	8	Matt Fagerson
OF	7	Hamish Watson
BF	6	Jamie Ritchie	(substituted off) 63'
RL	5	Jonny Gray	(substituted off) 55'
LL	4	Scott Cummings	(substituted off) 66'
TP	3	WP Nel	(substituted off) 55'
HK	2	George Turner	(substituted off) 64'
LP	1	Rory Sutherland	(substituted off) 66'
Replacements:
HK	16	Dave Cherry	(substituted on) 64'
PR	17	Jamie Bhatti	(substituted on) 66'
PR	18	Simon Berghan	(substituted on) 55'
LK	19	Grant Gilchrist	(substituted on) 55'
N8	20	Nick Haining	(substituted on) 63'
SH	21	Scott Steele	(substituted on) 66'
FH	22	Huw Jones	(substituted on) 55'
WG	23	Darcy Graham	(substituted on) 63'
Coach:
Gregor Townsend

FB	15	Hugo Keenan
RW	14	Keith Earls
OC	13	Garry Ringrose
IC	12	Robbie Henshaw
LW	11	James Lowe	(substituted off) 69'
FH	10	Johnny Sexton (c)
SH	9	Jamison Gibson-Park
N8	8	CJ Stander
OF	7	Will Connors
BF	6	Tadhg Beirne	(substituted off) 64'
RL	5	James Ryan	(substituted off) 71'
LL	4	Iain Henderson
TP	3	Tadhg Furlong	(substituted off) 55'
HK	2	Rob Herring	(substituted off) 64'
LP	1	Cian Healy	(substituted off) 55'
Replacements:
HK	16	Rónan Kelleher	(substituted on) 64'
PR	17	Dave Kilcoyne	(substituted on) 55'
PR	18	Andrew Porter	(substituted on) 55'
LK	19	Ryan Baird	(substituted on) 71'
N8	20	Jack Conan	(substituted on) 64'
SH	21	Conor Murray
FH	22	Billy Burns
WG	23	Jordan Larmour	(substituted on) 69'
Coach:
Andy Farrell

Player of the Match:
Tadhg Beirne (Ireland)

Touch judges:
Mathieu Raynal (France)
Andrea Piardi (Italy)
Television match official:
Alexandre Ruiz (France)

Notes:

- CJ Stander (Ireland) earned his 50th test cap.
- Ireland retain the Centenary Quaich.
- With this victory, Ireland lead their series with Scotland for the first time at 67 wins to 66.

=== Round 5 ===
20 March 2021
14:15 GMT (UTC+0)

(1 BP) Scotland	52–10	Italy
Try: Cherry (2) 11' m, 44' c Van der Merwe (2) 14' c, 71' c Graham 21' m Jones 28' c Steele 53' c Johnson 65' c Con: Hogg (6/8) 14', 29', 46', 54', 66', 72'	Report; Match data	Try: Bigi 6' c Con: Garbisi (1/1) 7'; Pen: Garbisi (1/1) 17'

Murrayfield Stadium, Edinburgh
Attendance: 0
Referee: Pascal Gaüzère (France) (Note: Pascal Gaüzère replaced Jaco Peyper, who was unable to travel due to travel restrictions.)

FB	15	Sean Maitland	(substituted off) 55'
RW	14	Darcy Graham
OC	13	Huw Jones
IC	12	Sam Johnson	(substituted off) 66'
LW	11	Duhan van der Merwe
FH	10	Stuart Hogg (c)
SH	9	Scott Steele	(substituted off) 55'
N8	8	Matt Fagerson
OF	7	Hamish Watson	(substituted off) 66'
BF	6	Jamie Ritchie
RL	5	Grant Gilchrist	(substituted off) 62'
LL	4	Sam Skinner
TP	3	Zander Fagerson	(substituted off) 49'
HK	2	Dave Cherry	(substituted off) 49'
LP	1	Rory Sutherland	(substituted off) 49'
Replacements:
HK	16	George Turner	(substituted on) 49'
PR	17	Jamie Bhatti	(substituted on) 49'
PR	18	Simon Berghan	(substituted on) 49'
LK	19	Alex Craig	(substituted on) 62'
N8	20	Nick Haining	(substituted on) 66'
SH	21	Ali Price	(substituted on) 55'
FH	22	Jaco van der Walt	(substituted on) 55'
CE	23	Chris Harris	(substituted on) 66'
Coach:
Gregor Townsend

FB	15	Edoardo Padovani
RW	14	Mattia Bellini
OC	13	Ignacio Brex
IC	12	Federico Mori	(yellow card) 20'	(substituted off) 54'
LW	11	Monty Ioane	(yellow card) 61'
FH	10	Paolo Garbisi		(substituted off) 54'
SH	9	Stephen Varney		(substituted off) 70'
N8	8	Michele Lamaro
OF	7	Johan Meyer		(substituted off) 76'
BF	6	Sebastian Negri	(yellow card) 52'
RL	5	Federico Ruzza		(substituted off) 62'
LL	4	Niccolò Cannone
TP	3	Marco Riccioni		(substituted off) 33'
HK	2	Luca Bigi (c)		(substituted off) 70'
LP	1	Danilo Fischetti		(substituted off) 70'
Replacements:
HK	16	Gianmarco Lucchesi		(substituted on) 70'
PR	17	Andrea Lovotti		(substituted on) 70'
PR	18	Giosuè Zilocchi		(substituted on) 33'
LK	19	Riccardo Favretto		(substituted on) 76'
FL	20	Maxime Mbanda		(substituted on) 62'
SH	21	Marcello Violi		(substituted on) 70'
FH	22	Carlo Canna		(substituted on) 54'
CE	23	Marco Zanon		(substituted on) 54'
Coach:
Franco Smith

Player of the Match:
Hamish Watson (Scotland)

Touch judges:
Karl Dickson (England)
Ben Whitehouse (Wales)
Television match official:
Alexandre Ruiz (France)

Notes:

- Alex Craig (Scotland) and Riccardo Favretto (Italy) made their international debuts.
- Scotland recorded their biggest win in any of the Six Nations, Five Nations or Home Nations tournaments, surpassing their previous record of 29 points, set against Italy in 2017.

20 March 2021
16:45 GMT (UTC+0)

Ireland	32–18	England
Try: Earls 22' c Conan 37' c Con: Sexton (2/2) 24', 38'; Pen: Sexton (6/6) 18', 30', 51', 62', 69', 74'	Report; Match data	Try: Youngs 64' m May 79' c Con: Daly (1/2) 79'; Pen: Farrell (2/2) 9', 27'

Aviva Stadium, Dublin
Attendance: 0
Referee: Mathieu Raynal (France)

FB	15	Hugo Keenan
RW	14	Keith Earls
OC	13	Robbie Henshaw		(substituted off) 79'
IC	12	Bundee Aki	(red card) 64'
LW	11	Jacob Stockdale		(substituted off) 78'
FH	10	Johnny Sexton (c)
SH	9	Conor Murray	(yellow card) 78'
N8	8	Jack Conan
OF	7	Josh van der Flier		(substituted off) 64'
BF	6	CJ Stander
RL	5	Tadhg Beirne
LL	4	Iain Henderson		(substituted off) 64'
TP	3	Tadhg Furlong		(substituted off) 64'
HK	2	Rob Herring		(substituted off) 71'
LP	1	Dave Kilcoyne		(substituted off) 20'
Replacements:
HK	16	Rónan Kelleher		(substituted on) 71'
PR	17	Cian Healy		(substituted on) 20'
PR	18	Andrew Porter		(substituted on) 64'
LK	19	Ryan Baird		(substituted on) 64'
FL	20	Peter O'Mahony		(substituted on) 64'
SH	21	Jamison Gibson-Park
FH	22	Ross Byrne		(substituted on) 79'
WG	23	Jordan Larmour		(substituted on) 78'
Coach:
Andy Farrell

FB	15	Elliot Daly
RW	14	Anthony Watson
OC	13	Ollie Lawrence
IC	12	Owen Farrell (c)	(substituted off) 56'
LW	11	Jonny May
FH	10	George Ford	(substituted off) 51'
SH	9	Ben Youngs
N8	8	Billy Vunipola	(substituted off) 64'
OF	7	Tom Curry
BF	6	Mark Wilson	(substituted off) 51'
RL	5	Charlie Ewels	(substituted off) 56'
LL	4	Maro Itoje
TP	3	Kyle Sinckler	(substituted off) 64'
HK	2	Luke Cowan-Dickie	(substituted off) 41'
LP	1	Mako Vunipola	(substituted off) 41'
Replacements:
HK	16	Jamie George	(substituted on) 41'
PR	17	Ellis Genge	(substituted on) 41'
PR	18	Will Stuart	(substituted on) 64'
LK	19	Jonny Hill	(substituted on) 56'
FL	20	Ben Earl	(substituted on) 51'
LK	21	George Martin	(substituted on) 64'
SH	22	Dan Robson	(substituted on) 56'
CE	23	Joe Marchant	(substituted on) 51'
Coach:
Eddie Jones

Player of the Match:
Robbie Henshaw (Ireland)

Touch judges:
Mike Adamson (Scotland)
Craig Evans (Wales)
Television match official:
Romain Poite (France)

Notes:

- Billy Burns (Ireland) had been named on the bench, but was ruled out ahead of kick off through injury and replaced by Ross Byrne.
- Max Malins (England) had been named to start at fullback, but was ruled out ahead of kick-off through injury; Elliot Daly moved to fullback from centre, Ollie Lawrence replaced him at 13 and George Martin came onto the bench.
- Ireland reclaimed the Millennium Trophy.
- England lost to Ireland, Scotland and Wales in the same championship for the first time since 1976.

20 March 2021
21:00 CET (UTC+1)

(1 BP) France	32–30	Wales (1 BP)
Try: Taofifénua 6' c Dupont 14' c Ollivon 77' c Dulin 80' m Con: Jalibert (2/2) 7', 15'; Ntamack (1/2) 77'; Pen: Ntamack (2/2) 34', 54'	Report; Match data	Try: Biggar 12' c Navidi 18' c Adams 50' c Con: Biggar (3/3) 12', 20', 51'; Pen: Biggar (3/3) 25', 46', 59'

Stade de France, Saint-Denis
Attendance: 0
Referee: Luke Pearce (England)

FB	15	Brice Dulin
RW	14	Teddy Thomas		(substituted off) 57'
OC	13	Virimi Vakatawa
IC	12	Gaël Fickou
LW	11	Damian Penaud
FH	10	Matthieu Jalibert		(substituted off) 30'
SH	9	Antoine Dupont		(substituted off) 74'
N8	8	Grégory Alldritt		(substituted off) 60'	(substituted on) 69'
OF	7	Charles Ollivon (c)
BF	6	Dylan Cretin		(substituted off) 51'
RL	5	Paul Willemse	(red card) 68'
LL	4	Romain Taofifénua		(substituted off) 22'
TP	3	Mohamed Haouas	(yellow card) 59'		(substituted off) 69'
HK	2	Julien Marchand		(substituted off) 69'
LP	1	Cyril Baille		(substituted off) 59'
Replacements:
HK	16	Camille Chat		(substituted on) 69'
PR	17	Jean-Baptiste Gros		(substituted on) 59'
PR	18	Uini Atonio		(substituted on) 60'
LK	19	Swan Rebbadj		(substituted on) 22'
FL	20	Anthony Jelonch		(substituted on) 51'
SH	21	Baptiste Serin		(substituted on) 74'
FH	22	Romain Ntamack		(substituted on) 30'
CE	23	Arthur Vincent		(substituted on) 57'
Coach:
Fabien Galthié

FB	15	Liam Williams	(yellow card) 73'
RW	14	Louis Rees-Zammit
OC	13	George North
IC	12	Jonathan Davies		(substituted off) 68'
LW	11	Josh Adams
FH	10	Dan Biggar		(substituted off) 68'
SH	9	Gareth Davies		(substituted off) 49'
N8	8	Taulupe Faletau	(yellow card) 72'
OF	7	Justin Tipuric
BF	6	Josh Navidi		(substituted off) 77'
RL	5	Alun Wyn Jones (c)
LL	4	Adam Beard		(substituted off) 57'
TP	3	Tomas Francis		(substituted off) 68'
HK	2	Ken Owens		(substituted off) 68'
LP	1	Wyn Jones		(substituted off) 77'
Replacements:
HK	16	Elliot Dee		(substituted on) 68'
PR	17	Nicky Smith		(substituted on) 77'
PR	18	Leon Brown		(substituted on) 68'
LK	19	Cory Hill		(substituted on) 57'
FL	20	James Botham		(substituted on) 77'
SH	21	Tomos Williams		(substituted on) 49'
FH	22	Callum Sheedy		(substituted on) 68'
CE	23	Willis Halaholo		(substituted on) 68'
Coach:
Wayne Pivac

Player of the Match:
Brice Dulin (France)

Touch judges:
Matthew Carley (England)
Christophe Ridley (England)
Television match official:
Wayne Barnes (England)

Notes:

- Wales' three tries took them to a total of 20 for the tournament, the most they have scored in a single Six Nations.

=== Rescheduled Round 3 match ===
26 March 2021
21:00 CET (UTC+1)

(1 BP) France	23–27	Scotland
Try: Dulin 36' c Penaud 46' m Rebbadj 66' m Con: Ntamack (1/3) 37'; Pen: Ntamack (2/2) 9', 28'	Report; Match data	Try: Van der Merwe (2) 15' c, 80' c Cherry 61' c Con: Russell (2/2) 15', 62'; Hastings (1/1) 80'; Pen: Russell (2/2) 19', 53'

Stade de France, Saint-Denis
Attendance: 0
Referee: Wayne Barnes (England)

FB	15	Brice Dulin
RW	14	Damian Penaud
OC	13	Virimi Vakatawa		(substituted off) 60'
IC	12	Arthur Vincent
LW	11	Gaël Fickou
FH	10	Romain Ntamack
SH	9	Antoine Dupont		(substituted off) 71'
N8	8	Grégory Alldritt
OF	7	Charles Ollivon (c)
BF	6	Anthony Jelonch		(substituted off) 63'
RL	5	Swan Rebbadj
LL	4	Bernard Le Roux		(substituted off) 50'
TP	3	Mohamed Haouas		(substituted off) 61'
HK	2	Julien Marchand		(substituted off) 56'
LP	1	Cyril Baille		(substituted off) 56'
Replacements:
HK	16	Camille Chat		(substituted on) 56'
PR	17	Jean-Baptiste Gros		(substituted on) 56'
PR	18	Uini Atonio		(substituted on) 61'
LK	19	Romain Taofifénua		(substituted on) 50'
FL	20	Dylan Cretin		(substituted on) 63'
SH	21	Baptiste Serin	(yellow card) 74'	(substituted on) 71'
FB	22	Anthony Bouthier
WG	23	Teddy Thomas		(substituted on) 60'
Coach:
Fabien Galthié

FB	15	Stuart Hogg (c)	(yellow card) 40'
RW	14	Darcy Graham		(substituted off) 67'
OC	13	Chris Harris
IC	12	Sam Johnson		(substituted off) 73'
LW	11	Duhan van der Merwe
FH	10	Finn Russell	(red card) 71'
SH	9	Ali Price
N8	8	Nick Haining		(substituted off) 67'
OF	7	Hamish Watson
BF	6	Jamie Ritchie
RL	5	Grant Gilchrist
LL	4	Sam Skinner		(substituted off) 75'
TP	3	Zander Fagerson		(substituted off) 63'	(substituted on) 70'
HK	2	George Turner		(substituted off) 59'
LP	1	Rory Sutherland		(substituted off) 49'
Replacements:
HK	16	Dave Cherry		(substituted on) 59'
PR	17	Oli Kebble		(substituted on) 49'
PR	18	Simon Berghan		(substituted on) 63'	(substituted off) 70'
LK	19	Alex Craig		(substituted on) 75'
N8	20	Ryan Wilson		(substituted on) 67'
SH	21	Scott Steele
FH	22	Adam Hastings		(substituted on) 73'
CE	23	Huw Jones		(substituted on) 67'
Coach:
Gregor Townsend

Player of the Match:
Gaël Fickou (France)

Touch judges:
Matthew Carley (England)
Andrea Piardi (Italy)
Television match official:
Tom Foley (England)

Notes:

- Matt Fagerson was originally named at number 8 for Scotland, but suffered an injury in training and was replaced by Nick Haining; Ryan Wilson replaced Haining among the substitutes.
- Ryan Wilson (Scotland) earned his 50th test cap.
- Scotland won in Paris for the first time since a 36–22 victory in 1999.
- With this victory, Scotland beat both England and France away from home for the first time in the tournament since 1926 and only the second time in 45 attempts.
- Scotland retained the Auld Alliance Trophy.

== Player statistics ==
=== Most points ===
Pos	Name	Team	Pts
1	Johnny Sexton	Ireland	65
2	Owen Farrell	England	50
3	Dan Biggar	Wales	36
4	Finn Russell	Scotland	35
5	Matthieu Jalibert	France	34
6	Stuart Hogg	Scotland	26
7	Duhan van der Merwe	Scotland	25
8	Callum Sheedy	Wales	24
9	Paolo Garbisi	Italy	23
10	Louis Rees-Zammit	Wales	20
10	Anthony Watson	England	20

=== Most tries ===
Pos	Name	Team	Tries
1	Duhan van der Merwe	Scotland	5
2	Louis Rees-Zammit	Wales	4
2	Anthony Watson	England	4
4	Josh Adams	Wales	3
4	Dave Cherry	Scotland	3
4	Brice Dulin	France	3
4	Antoine Dupont	France	3
4	Damian Penaud	France	3
9	14 players		2

== See also ==
- 2021 Women's Six Nations Championship
