= Rayan Rebbadj =

French rugby union player (born 1999)

- Born: 15 August 1999 (age 27) Martigues, France
- Height: 1.88 m (6 ft 2 in)
- Weight: 96 kg (212 lb)
- Notable relative: Swan Rebbadj (brother)

Rugby union career
- Position: Centre
Senior career
Years	Team	Apps	(Points)
2011-2018	RC Port-de-Bouc		
2018-	Rugby Club Toulonnais		
National sevens team
Years	Team		Comps
- France 7s
Medal record
Men's rugby sevens
Representing France
Olympic Games
Gold medal – first place	2024 Paris	Team competition

Rayan Rebbadj (born 15 August 1999) is a French rugby union player who plays at Centre for Rugby Club Toulonnais and the France national rugby sevens team.

== Career ==
He played as a youngster for RC Port-de-Bouc between 2011 and 2018, and for Rugby Club Toulonnais from 2018, signing his first professional contract in 2021.

He was included in the team of the tournament as France national rugby sevens team won the 2024 Spain Sevens in June 2024. He was subsequently named in the French Rugby Sevens team for the 2024 Paris Olympics.

Continuing with France for the 2025-26 SVNS, he was a try scorer in the final as France won the 2026 France Sevens in Bordeaux in June 2026, defeating New Zealand 14-5 in the final.

== Personal life ==
From Martigues, he has Algerian heritage. His uncles Rabah and Salek played for RC Toulon in the 1980s. His brother Swan Rebbadj is also a professional rugby union player.
