= Arthur Vincent (rugby union) =

French rugby union player (born 1999)

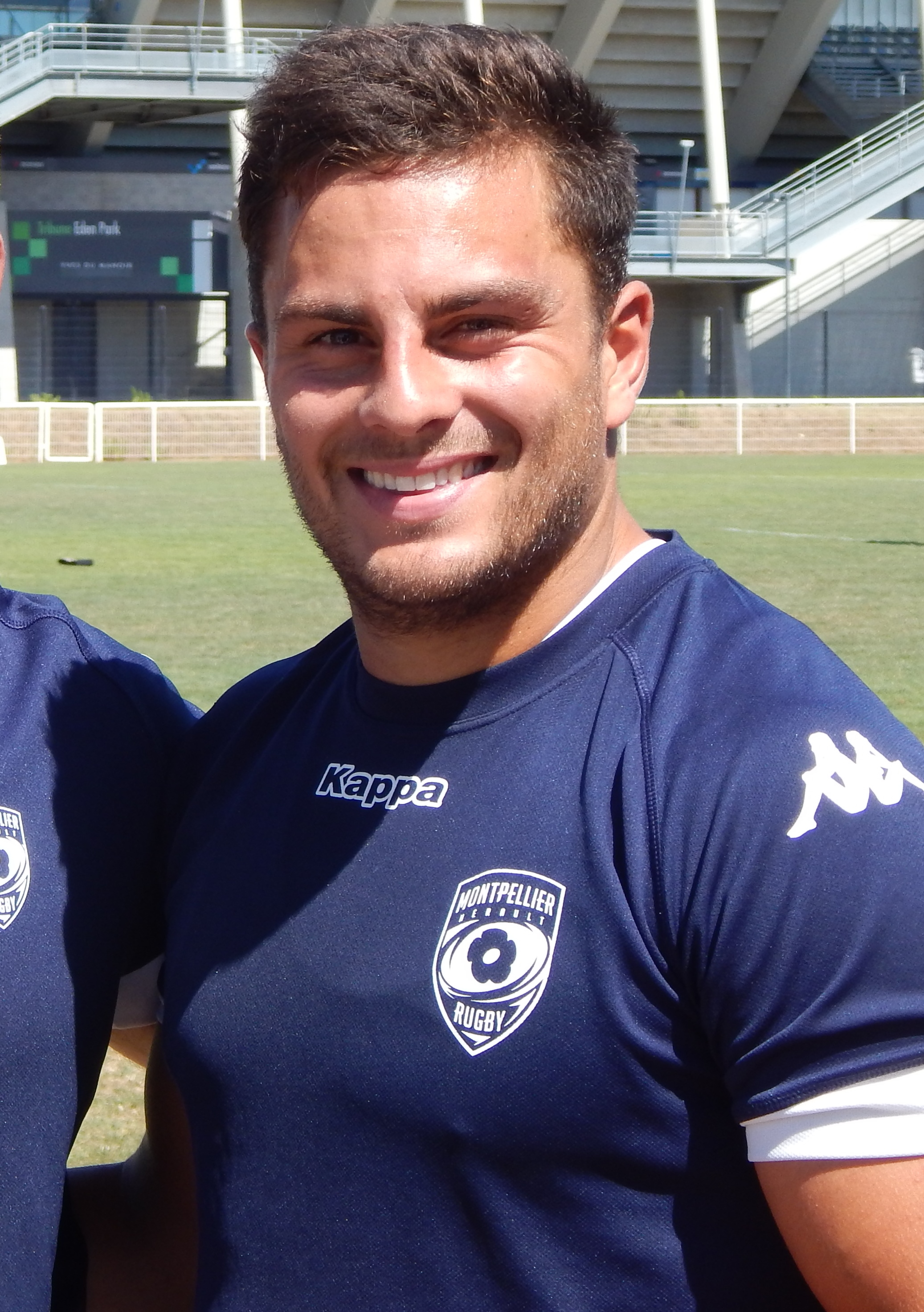
- Born: Arthur Vincent; 30 September 1999 (age 27) Montpellier, France
- Height: 1.83 m (6 ft 0 in)
- Weight: 88 kg (194 lb; 13 st 12 lb)

Rugby union career
- Position: Centre
- Current team: Montpellier
Senior career
Years	Team	Apps	(Points)
2017–	Montpellier	102	(55)
- Correct as of 4 February 2025
International career
Years	Team	Apps	(Points)
2018–2019	France U20	14	(5)
2020–	France	18	(5)
- Correct as of 10 July 2024

Arthur Vincent (born 30 September 1999) is a French professional rugby union player. His position is centre and he currently plays for Montpellier in the Top 14.

== International career ==
=== International tries ===
International tries
No.	Date	Venue	Opponent	Score	Result	Competition
1	6 February 2021	Stadio Olimpico, Rome, Italy	Italy	3–22	10–50	2021 Six Nations

== International honours ==
France (U20)

- Six Nations Under 20s Championship winners: 2018
- World Rugby Under 20 Championship winners (2): 2018, 2019
