= Swan Rebbadj =

France international rugby union player

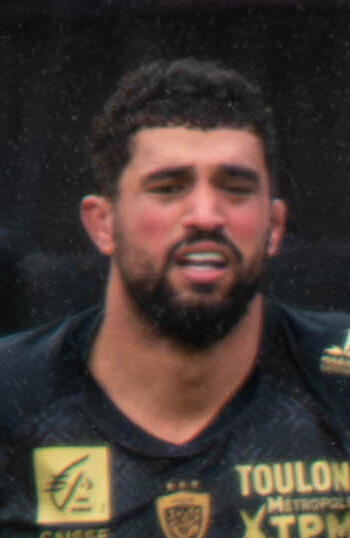
- Born: Swan Rebbadj; 15 January 1995 (age 31) Mont-de-Marsan, France
- Height: 2.02 m (6 ft 7 1/2 in)
- Weight: 115 kg (254 lb; 18 st 2 lb)
- Notable relative: Rayan Rebbadj (brother)

Rugby union career
- Position(s): Lock, flanker
- Current team: Toulon
Amateur team(s)
Years	Team	Apps	(Points)
- RC Martigues Port-de-Bouc
–	Toulon		
Senior career
Years	Team	Apps	(Points)
2016–	Toulon	162	(25)
- Correct as of 13 February 2021
International career
Years	Team	Apps	(Points)
2017–	Barbarian RC	4	(0)
2020–	France	4	(5)
- Correct as of 26 Mar 2021

Swan Rebbadj (born 15 January 1995) is a French rugby union player, his regular playing position is Flanker and as Lock for Toulon in the Top 14.

== Career ==
Rebbadj started playing at RC Toulon in the 2016–17 season quickly becoming one of Toulon central pieces in the next few seasons.

Rebbadj was selected by Franck Azéma and Bernard Goutta for the French Barbarians during the autumn rugby union internationals. He made his debut on the international stage starting against the Māori All Blacks at Chaban-Delmas on the 10 November 2020.

== International career ==
After a remarkable 2019–20 season, Rebbadj was selected in the French national squad for the Autumn Nations Cup.

=== International tries ===
International tries
No.	Date	Venue	Opponent	Score	Result	Competition
1	26 March 2021	Stade de France, Saint-Denis, France	Scotland	23–20	23–27	2021 Six Nations

== Personal life ==
From Martigues, he has Algerian heritage. His uncles Rabah and Salek played for RC Toulon in the 1980s. His brother Rayan Rebbadj is also a professional rugby union player for the France national rugby sevens team.
