= Anthony Watson (rugby union) =

English international rugby union player

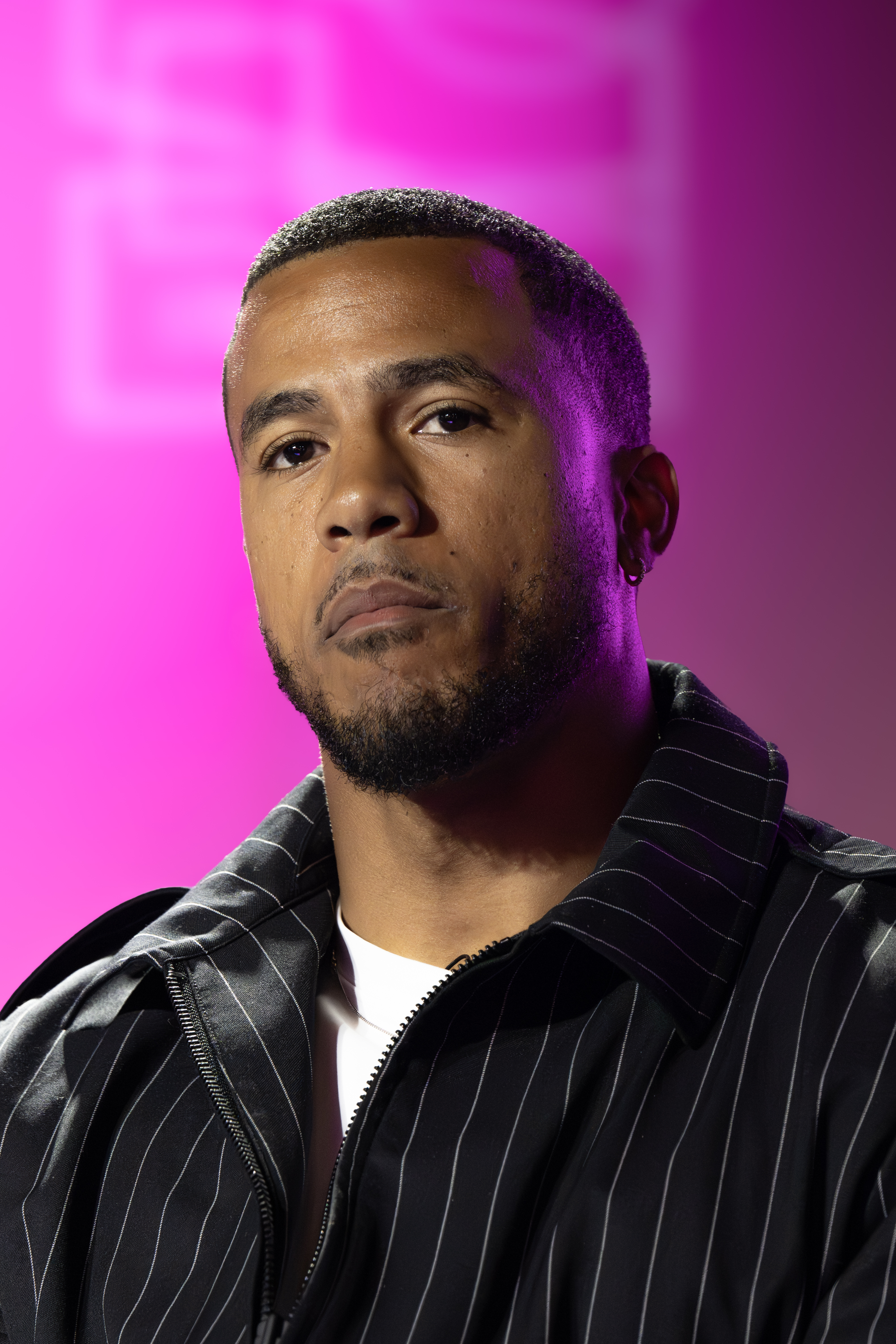
- At SXSW London, June 2026
- Full name: Anthony Kenneth Chisom Watson
- Born: 26 February 1994 (age 32) Ashford, England
- Height: 1.85 m (6 ft 1 in)
- Weight: 93 kg (205 lb; 14 st 9 lb)
- School: St. George's College
- University: Northumbria University; University of Bath
- Notable relative(s): Marcus Watson (brother), Callum Watson (brother)

Rugby union career
- Position(s): Wing, Fullback
Senior career
Years	Team	Apps	(Points)
2011–2013	London Irish	22	(20)
2013–2022	Bath	126	(160)
2022–2024	Leicester Tigers	23	(40)
2011–2024	Total	171	(220)
- Correct as of 17 January 2025
International career
Years	Team	Apps	(Points)
2012–2013	England U20	21	(25)
2014–2023	England	56	(115)
2017, 2021	British & Irish Lions	5	(0)
- Correct as of 19 August 2023
Medal record
Men's Rugby union
Representing England
Rugby World Cup
Silver medal – second place	2019 Japan	Squad

Anthony Kenneth Chisom Watson (born 26 February 1994) is an English former professional rugby union player who last played as a wing or fullback for Leicester Tigers, the England national team and the British and Irish Lions.

== Early life ==
Watson attended St George's College, Weybridge in Surrey, where he was vice-captain of the rugby team. His brother is Benetton winger Marcus Watson.

== Club career ==
In September 2011 Watson made his professional debut against Newcastle Falcons and became the youngest player to ever appear for London Irish in a Premiership match. He scored his first tries for the club in their victory over Stade Montois on 20 October 2012.

On 25 April 2013 it was announced that Watson would join Bath for the following season. In his first campaign at the club he scored a try in the final of the EPCR Challenge Cup as Bath finished runners up to Northampton Saints at Cardiff Arms Park. The next season saw Watson start in their Premiership final defeat to Saracens.

On 12 May 2022 Watson signed for Leicester Tigers. He made his debut for Leicester in a 51-18 loss to Saracens on 1 October 2022. On 18 August 2023 it was confirmed that Watson had left Leicester after failing to agree a new contract. Instead he became employed by the Rugby Football Union. Watson signed a new contract back at Leicester on 2 November 2023

Watson announced his retirement on medical grounds in January 2025.

== International career ==
=== England ===
Watson scored a try for the England U20 team as they defeated Ireland in the final round of the 2012 Six Nations Under 20s Championship to win the tournament. He was also a member of the side that retained the 2013 Six Nations Under 20s Championship. Later that year Watson was selected for the 2013 IRB Junior World Championship scoring a try in their semi-final victory over New Zealand and started in the final as England defeated Wales to become world junior champions for the first time.

At the age of nineteen, after a string of impressive performances for Bath at full-back, Watson was called into the senior England squad by coach Stuart Lancaster to train with them during their autumn international series in November 2013. In January 2014 he again trained with the squad during the 2014 Six Nations Championship and later that month scored a try for the England Saxons in a defeat against Ireland Wolfhounds.

Watson was included in the senior squad for their 2014 tour of New Zealand and scored a try on his England debut in a non-cap tour match against Crusaders. On 8 November 2014, Watson made his official test debut for England, from the bench, losing to New Zealand 21-24 as part of their 2014 Autumn Internationals.

Watson scored his first tries for England against Wales and France during the 2015 Six Nations. He was included in the squad for the 2015 Rugby World Cup and scored in warm-up fixtures against France and Ireland. He was selected to start in all four of England's pool games at the tournament, scoring tries against Australia and Uruguay as the hosts failed to reach the knockout phase.

Watson was selected by new coach Eddie Jones for the 2016 Six Nations Championship and recorded tries against Ireland and Wales. He also scored in the final round as England beat France to achieve their first Grand Slam in over a decade. Later that year he scored a try against Wales and then started in all three victories on their 2016 tour of Australia. The following year saw Watson score a try in the penultimate round of the 2017 Six Nations against Scotland and then start in the final game of the competition as England missed out on a consecutive grand slam with defeat away to Ireland which also brought an end to a record equalling eighteen successive Test victories.

Watson was included in the squad for the 2019 Rugby World Cup and scored a try in a warm-up game against Italy at St James' Park. He scored the last try of the quarter-final against Australia and also played in the semi-final victory over New Zealand. He started in the final as England were defeated by South Africa to finish runners up.

Watson scored a try against Wales during the 2020 Six Nations and then started the final round victory in Italy which meant England won the tournament. Later that year he started in the final of the Autumn Nations Cup as England defeated France in extra time to win the competition. Watson scored tries against Italy and Wales during the 2021 Six Nations. Later in the tournament he scored a try against France on his fiftieth appearance for England.

=== British & Irish Lions ===
Watson was named as one of the 41 British & Irish Lions players that toured New Zealand in 2017. He started in all three tests as the series ended all square.

Watson was also selected by coach Warren Gatland for the 2021 Lions tour of South Africa. He started the first two tests; winning the first and losing the second. He was dropped for the final match which saw the Lions lose the series 2-1.

== Career statistics ==
=== List of international tries ===
As of 25 February 2023

Try	Opposing team	Location	Venue	Competition	Date	Result	Score
1	Wales	Cardiff, Wales	Millennium Stadium	2015 Six Nations	6 February 2015	Win	21 – 16
2	France	London, England	Twickenham Stadium	2015 Six Nations	23 March 2015	Win	55 – 35
3	France	London, England	Twickenham Stadium	2015 Rugby World Cup Warm-Up	15 August 2015	Win	19 – 14
4	France	London, England	Twickenham Stadium	2015 Rugby World Cup Warm-Up	15 August 2015	Win	19 – 14
5	Ireland	London, England	Twickenham Stadium	2015 Rugby World Cup Warm-Up	5 September 2015	Win	21 – 13
6	Australia	London, England	Twickenham Stadium	2015 Rugby World Cup	3 October 2015	Loss	13 – 33
7	Uruguay	Manchester, England	City of Manchester Stadium	2015 Rugby World Cup	10 October 2015	Win	60 – 3
8	Uruguay	Manchester, England	City of Manchester Stadium	2015 Rugby World Cup	10 October 2015	Win	60 – 3
9	Ireland	London, England	Twickenham Stadium	2016 Six Nations	27 February 2016	Win	21 – 10
10	Wales	London, England	Twickenham Stadium	2016 Six Nations	12 March 2016	Win	25 – 21
11	France	Paris, France	Stade de France	2016 Six Nations	19 March 2016	Win	31 – 21
12	Wales	London, England	Twickenham Stadium	2016 Summer Tour Warm-Up	29 May 2016	Win	27 – 13
13	Scotland	London, England	Twickenham Stadium	2017 Six Nations	11 March 2017	Win	61 – 21
14	Italy	Rome, Italy	Stadio Olimpico	2018 Six Nations	4 February 2018	Win	46 – 15
15	Italy	Rome, Italy	Stadio Olimpico	2018 Six Nations	4 February 2018	Win	46 – 15
16	Italy	Newcastle, England	St James' Park	2019 Rugby World Cup Warm-Up	6 September 2019	Win	37 – 0
17	Australia	Ōita, Japan	Ōita Bank Dome	2019 Rugby World Cup	19 October 2019	Win	40 – 16
18	Wales	London, England	Twickenham Stadium	2020 Six Nations	7 March 2020	Win	33 – 30
19	Italy	London, England	Twickenham Stadium	2021 Six Nations	13 February 2021	Win	41 – 18
20	Italy	London, England	Twickenham Stadium	2021 Six Nations	13 February 2021	Win	41 – 18
21	Wales	Cardiff, Wales	Millennium Stadium	2021 Six Nations	27 February 2021	Loss	24 – 40
22	France	London, England	Twickenham Stadium	2021 Six Nations	13 March 2021	Win	23 – 20
23	Wales	Cardiff, Wales	Millennium Stadium	2023 Six Nations	25 February 2023	Win	20 – 10

== Honours ==
England

- 3× Six Nations Championship: 2016, 2017, 2020
- 1× Autumn Nations Cup: 2020
- 1× Rugby World Cup runner-up: 2019

Bath

- 1× Premiership Rugby runner-up: 2015
- 1× EPCR Challenge Cup runner-up: 2014
