= Luca Bigi =

Italian rugby union player (born 1991)

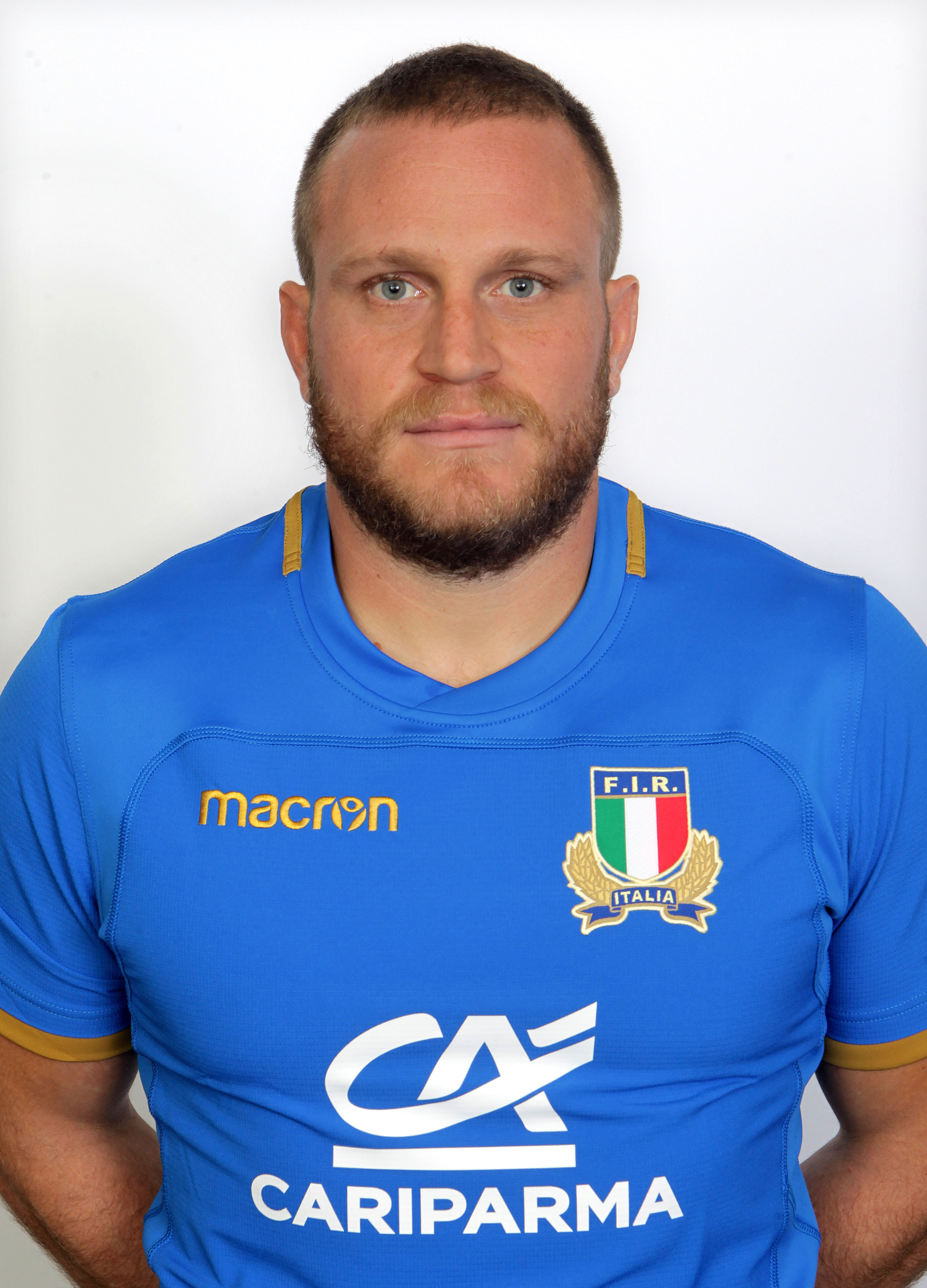
- Bigi representing the Italian Rugby Federation, October 2017
- Born: 19 April 1991 (age 35) Reggio Emilia, Italy
- Height: 180 cm (5 ft 11 in)
- Weight: 105 kg (231 lb; 16 st 7 lb)

Rugby union career
- Position: Hooker
Senior career
Years	Team	Apps	(Points)
2011–2013	Valorugby Emilia	39	(25)
2013–2014	Viadana	24	(20)
2014–2015	Petrarca	17	(10)
2015–2019	Benetton	60	(45)
2019–2025	Zebre Parma	72	(40)
2025–2026	Valorugby Emilia		
- Correct as of 4 Aug 2026
International career
Years	Team	Apps	(Points)
2015	Emerging Italy	2	(0)
2017–	Italy	48	(5)
- Correct as of 4 Aug 2026

Luca Bigi (Italian pronunciation: [ˈluːka ˈbiːdʒi]; born 19 April 1991) is a retired Italian professional rugby union player who primarily played hooker. He has represented Italy at international level, having made his test debut against Scotland during the 2017 Summer Internationals. Bigi has previously played for clubs such as Valorugby Emilia, Viadana, Petrarca, Benetton, Zebre Parma in the past.

== Professional career ==
Bigi was playing with Viadana and Petrarca Padova, when he caught the eye of the Benetton staff and signed with the Pro12 side in 2015. He played with Benetton until 2018–19 Pro14 season. He played for Zebre Parma of the United Rugby Championship from 2019 to 2025.

In 2015, Bigi was named in the Emerging Italy squad for the 2015 World Rugby Tbilisi Cup.

Bigi forced his way into the starting lineup and earned his first test call up in 2017 Italy squad. In 2018, he impressed Italy head coach Conor O'Shea, in his first season of test rugby, earning 6 Test caps for his country and earned a spot in Italy's 2018 Six Nations squad. Bigi was also named in the 2019 Six Nations squad, having had 3 previous appearances.

On 18 August 2019, Bigi was named in the final 31-man squad for the 2019 Rugby World Cup.

In January 2020, Bigi was named Captain of Italy squad for 2020 Six Nations in substitution of Sergio Parisse. He was captain until 2021 Six Nations.

On 22 August 2023, he was named in the Italy's 33-man squad for the 2023 Rugby World Cup.
