= Dave Cherry =

Scotland international rugby union player

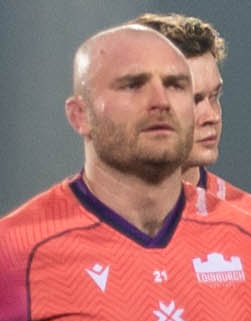
- Full name: David Murray Campbell Cherry
- Born: 3 January 1991 (age 35) Edinburgh, Scotland
- Height: 1.83 m (6 ft 0 in)
- Weight: 107 kg (236 lb; 16 st 12 lb)
- School: Merchiston Castle School

Rugby union career
- Position: Hooker
- Current team: Edinburgh Rugby
Senior career
| Years | Team | Apps | (Points) |
| 2014–2017 | London Scottish | 53 | (45) |
| 2018– | Edinburgh Rugby | 101 | (60) |
- Correct as of 25 February 2025
International career
| Years | Team | Apps | (Points) |
| 2011 | Scotland U20 | 7 | (0) |
| 2021– | Scotland | 14 | (20) |
| 2022 | Scotland 'A' | 1 | (0) |
- Correct as of 25 February 2025

David Murray Campbell Cherry (born 3 January 1991) is a Scottish professional rugby union player who plays as a hooker for United Rugby Championship club Edinburgh Rugby and the Scotland national team.

== Professional career ==
=== Club ===
Cherry played for Currie until 2014. On leaving London Scottish he then played for French Federale 2 side Stade Niçois.

Cherry signed his first professional contract with London Scottish in 2014. He was with the Exiles till 2017 when he joined Stade Niçois. Cherry joined Edinburgh in the summer of 2018.

=== International ===
On 16 January 2019 Gregor Townsend named three hookers among seven uncapped players, for his Scotland Six Nations squad. Cherry was among those selected.

He was not selected in 2019 but was called up again in 2021. Cherry said: "I always thought I was good enough to play at this level, but it [the Scotland squad] was a big step up. But I’ve fitted in pretty well at Edinburgh and I’ve put in some good performances, so I don’t think I’m a million miles off."

He received his first cap for Scotland in the Calcutta Cup match against England at Twickenham Stadium on 6 February 2021. Scotland won the match 11-6. His first start came in the penultimate game of the Championship, a 52-10 victory over Italy in which Cherry scored two tries. His fifth cap came in the postponed match against France on 26 March 2021 which Scotland famously won 27-23, when he scored his third international try In 2023 Cherry was selected in the 33 player squad for the 2023 Rugby World Cup in France.

== Career statistics ==
=== List of international tries ===
| Number | Position | Points | Tries | Result | Opposition | Venue | Date | Ref. |
|---|---|---|---|---|---|---|---|---|
| T1 | Hooker | 10 | 2 | Won | Italy | Murrayfield Stadium | 20 March 2021 | |
| 3 | Hooker | 5 | 1 | Won | France | Stade de France | 26 March 2021 | |

as of 3 June 2022
