= Luca Sperandio =

Italy international rugby union player

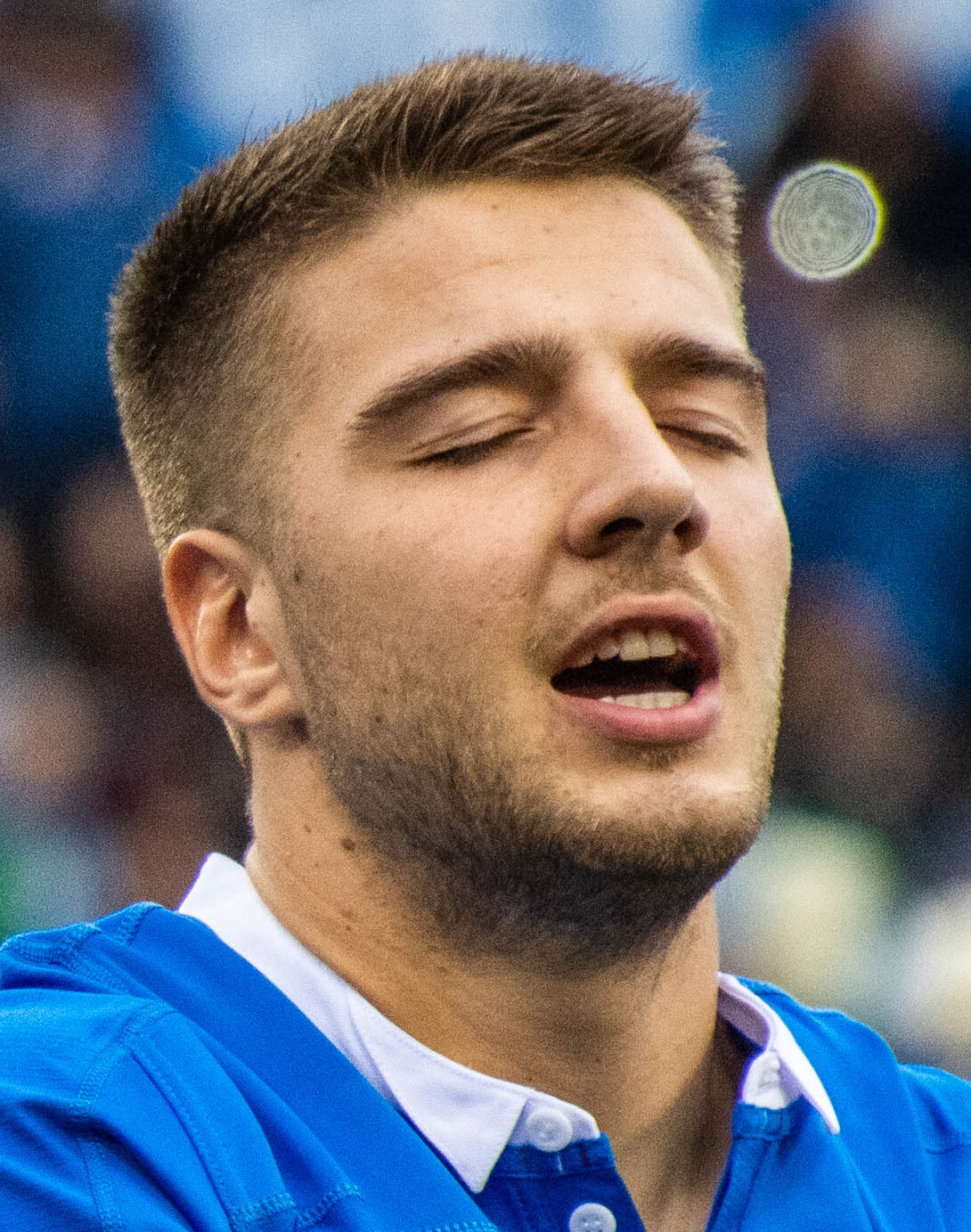
- Sperandio in 2018
- Born: 28 January 1996 (age 30) Treviso
- Height: 1.88 m (6 ft 2 in)
- Weight: 93 kg (14 st 9 lb; 205 lb)

Rugby union career
- Position: Wing
- Current team: Rangers Vicenza Rugby
Youth career
- Benetton
Senior career
| Years | Team | Apps | (Points) |
| 2014−2016 | Mogliano | 11 | (5) |
| 2016−2022 | Benetton | 70 | (80) |
| 2022−2023 | SC Albi | 11 | (2) |
| 2023−2025 | Rovigo Delta | | |
| 2025− | Rangers Vicenza | | |
- Correct as of 8 Oct 2022
International career
| Years | Team | Apps | (Points) |
| 2015−2016 | Italy Under 20 | 18 | (15) |
| 2016–2022 | Italy A | 1 | (0) |
| 2017−2021 | Italy | 11 | (5) |
- Correct as of 27 Feb 2021

Luca Sperandio (born 28 January 1996) is an Italian rugby union player. His usual position is as a Wing, and he currently plays for Rangers Vicenza after the experience with Rovigo Delta in Italian Serie A Elite.

Born in Treviso and raised by the Benetton entourage, Luca won Under 16 and Under 18 Italian Championships with the green-and-white club from la Marca before being called at only 18 to compete in the National Championship of Excellence – the country's main senior Championship – with Mogliano.

Since joining Benetton Treviso from Mogliano at the end of last season, Sperandio has worked hard to become one of the key weapons in coach Kieran Crowley’s arsenal.

The former Italy U20 runner stands at 6 ft 2in, and weight around 93 kg, which gives him both an excellent speed and rare agility, making him a reliable option in almost every spot in the backs.

But it is on either wing where he is at home and he is one of the wingers in Italy's pipeline for the future.

Sperandio has been involved in almost every Italian Squad at junior level, and he enjoyed Six Nations Under 20 campaigns and a couple of Junior World Championships, scoring a try against Georgia last year in England.

His Guinness Pro12 debut came on the last weekend of November at Thomond Park and he hasn't stop playing since. He played with Benetton until 2021–22 United Rugby Championship season. He was picked by Crowley in the starting XV that twice beat Bayonne in the European Rugby Challenge Cup in December and then went on to score tries in successive League games against Zebre and Glasgow Warriors the following weekends.

For 2022−23 season, he signed for French team Albi.

From 2023 to 2025, he played for Rovigo Delta in Italian Serie A Elite.

Although he still has room to develop the tactical and positional aspects of his game, his rapid progress has led to suggestions that he could earn a future call-up to the Italy national rugby union team under Conor O'Shea.

He has played for Benetton Treviso and has been regarded as one of the more prominent young Italian players in the Guinness PRO12.

On the 8 December 2021, he was selected by Alessandro Troncon to be part of an Emerging Italy 27-man squad for the 2021 end-of-year rugby union internationals.

== International tries ==
As of 3 June 2022

| Try | Opposing team | Location | Venue | Competition | Date | Result | Score |
|---|---|---|---|---|---|---|---|
| 1 | France | Rome, Italy | Stadio Olimpico | 2021 Six Nations | 6 February 2021 | Loss | 10 - 50 |
