= Gary Graham (rugby union) =

Scotland international rugby union player

- Born: Gary Graham; 29 August 1992 (age 34) Stirling, Scotland
- Height: 1.88 m (6 ft 2 in)
- Weight: 112 kg (17 st 9 lb)
- Notable relative: George Graham

Rugby union career
- Position: Flanker
Amateur team(s)
| Years | Team | Apps | (Points) |
- Carlisle
| 2012–2015 | Gala | | |
Senior career
| Years | Team | Apps | (Points) |
| 2015–2017 | Jersey Reds | 40 | (40) |
| 2017–2023 | Newcastle Falcons | 82 | (60) |
| 2023-2026 | US Carcassonne | 15 | (10) |
- Correct as of 11 March 2024
International career
| Years | Team | Apps | (Points) |
| 2012 | Scotland U20s | | |
- Scotland Club XV
| 2019– | Scotland | 4 | (0) |
- Correct as of 3 December 2023

Gary Graham (born 29 August 1992) is a Scotland international rugby union player, whose position is openside flanker. He plays for US Carcassonne in the third tier of French rugby.

== Early life ==
Born in Stirling, Scotland, he is the son of former Scotland international prop George Graham but grew up playing rugby in Carlisle, England.

== Rugby Union career ==
=== Amateur career ===
He first played for Carlisle and then Gala.

=== Professional career ===
On 6 February 2015, Graham signed for English Championship side Jersey Reds on his first professional contract with the Islanders club. On 22 March 2017, Graham signed for Gallagher Premiership Rugby side Newcastle Falcons ahead of the 2017–18 season. He left Newcastle Falcons in 2023.

=== International career ===
Graham represented the Scotland U20s during the 2012 Six Nations Under-20s Championship and during the 2012 IRB Junior World Championship.

Initially overlooked by the senior Scotland side, Graham received an England call up in December 2017, for the 34 man Six Nations training squad. He was subsequently named in the English squad for the 2018 Six Nations Championship.

Graham had a change of heart in November 2018 and was called up to the Scotland squad. He was subsequently named in the squad for the 2019 Six Nations Championship.

He made his Scotland debut on 2 February 2019 in the Six Nations against Italy. Scotland won 33–20.
