= Maxime Mbanda =

Italian rugby union player

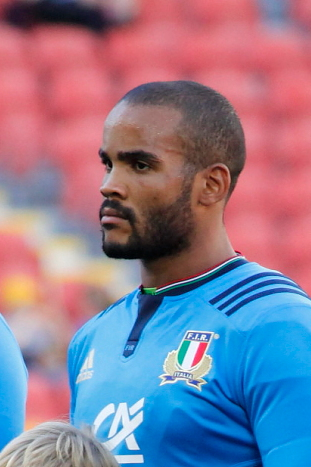
- Mbanda in 2017
- Full name: Mata Maxime Mbanda
- Born: 10 April 1993 (age 33) Rome, Italy
- Height: 1.89 m (6 ft 2 in)
- Weight: 102 kg (16 st 1 lb; 225 lb)

Rugby union career
- Position(s): Flanker, Number 8
- Current team: Colorno
Youth career
- 2002−2011: Amatori Milano
Senior career
Years	Team	Apps	(Points)
2011−2012	Rugby Grande Milano		
2012−2013	F.I.R. Academy		
2013−2016	Calvisano	40	(20)
2015	→Zebre	4	(0)
2016−2022	Zebre	71	(35)
2022−2025	Colorno	47	
- Correct as of 6 May 2022
International career
Years	Team	Apps	(Points)
2013	Italy Under 20	8	(20)
2014−2015	Emerging Italy	6	(5)
2016−2022	Italy	29	(10)
- Correct as of 20 Mar 2021

Mata Maxime Esuite Mbanda Cavaliere OMRI (born 10 April 1993) is an Italian international rugby union player. His usual position is as a flanker, and he currently plays for Colorno. Known for his ball carrying and athleticism.

== Early career ==
For 2015–16 Pro12 season, he named as Permit Player for Zebre in Pro 14.

In 2013, Mbanda was named in the Italy Under 20 squad and in 2014 and 2015, he was also named to the Emerging Italy squad.

== Professional career ==
In 2016, from Calvisano, he signed for Zebre in Pro 14. He played for Italian team until 2021–22 United Rugby Championship season. After a string of favourable performances, the No. 8, was selected to represent, the Italian national team in a test-match in San Jose, California, during Summer International tests against the United States. Italy won with a result of 24 to 20. Since then Mbanda has been a regular in the Italian national side, featuring in the 2019 Rugby World Cup, in Japan.

== Personal life ==
During the COVID-19 pandemic in Italy, Mbanda volunteered for the Yellow Cross, a humanitarian organization in Parma that transports food and medicine for the elderly. On 3 June 2020, the President of Italy Sergio Mattarella named Mbanda a Knight of the Order of Merit of the Italian Republic for his services as a volunteer ambulance driver.
