= Sebastian Negri =

Italy international rugby union player

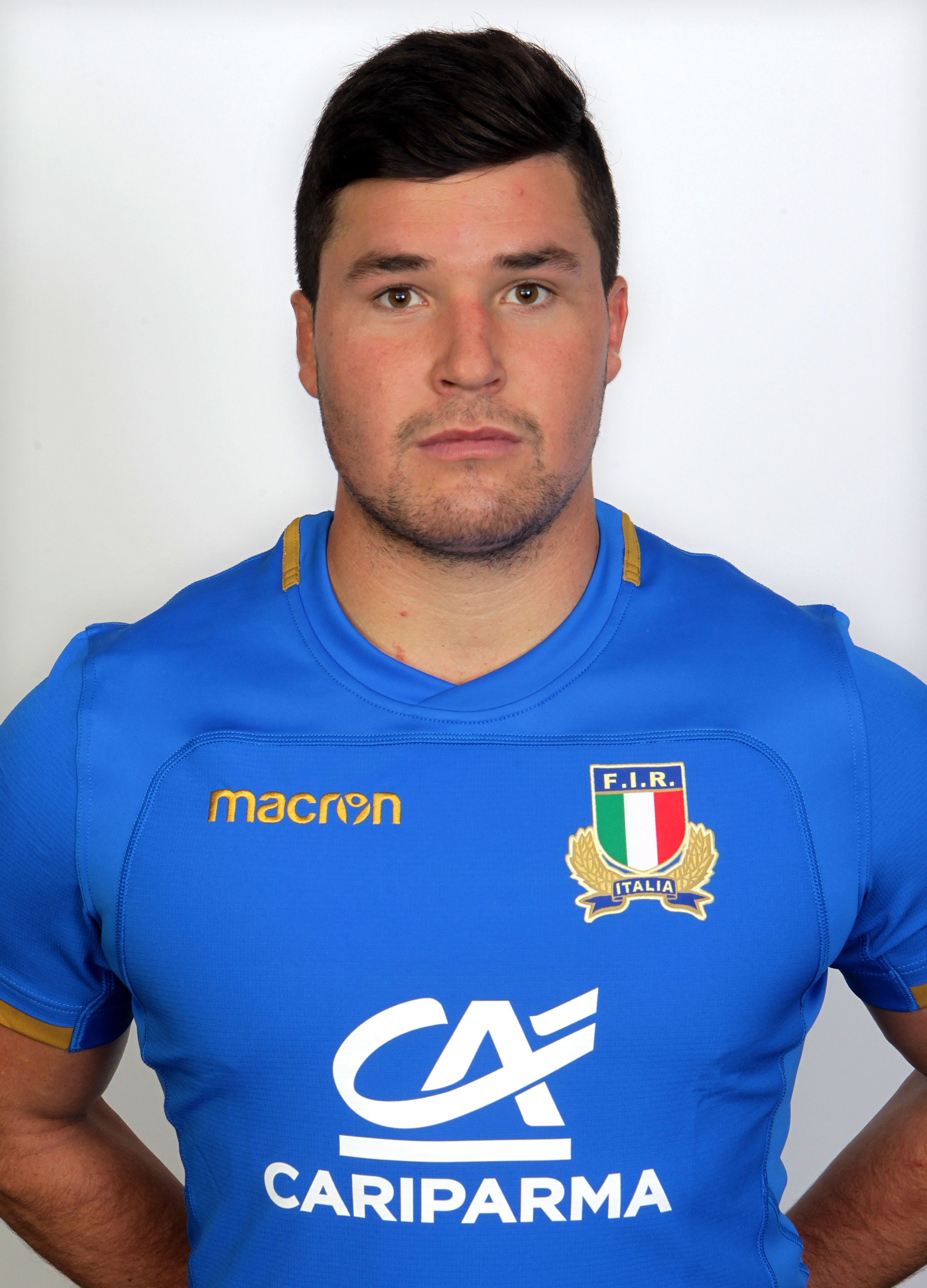
- Negri representing the Italian Rugby Federation, October 2017
- Full name: Sebastian Luke Negri da Oleggio
- Born: 30 June 1994 (age 32) Marondera, Zimbabwe
- Height: 195 cm (6 ft 5 in)
- Weight: 108 kg (238 lb; 17 st 0 lb)

Rugby union career
- Position(s): Flanker, Lock
- Current team: Benetton
Senior career
| Years | Team | Apps | (Points) |
| 2014−2017 | Hartpury University | 15 | (5) |
| 2017− | Benetton | 100 | (45) |
- Correct as of 30 Aug 2026
International career
| Years | Team | Apps | (Points) |
| 2013–2014 | Italy under-20 | 9 | (0) |
| 2015–2017 | Emerging Italy | 6 | (0) |
| 2016– | Italy | 65 | (10) |
- Correct as of 12 Jul 2025

Sebastian Luke Negri da Oleggio (born 30 June 1994) is a professional rugby union player who primarily plays flanker for Benetton of the United Rugby Championship. He was born in Zimbabwe and grew up in both Zimbabwe and South Africa, and represents Italy at international level, qualifying through his Italian father. He made his test debut against the United States in 2016. Negri has previously played for clubs such as Sharks and Western Province in the past.

== Early life ==
Negri was born in Marondera, Zimbabwe – where his family owned a farm – to a Milanese father and an Anglo-Zimbabwean mother, who was the godmother of future Scotland international David Denton. He has three siblings – two brothers and a sister.

He attended Springvale House in Zimbabwe. Negri started playing rugby at the age of 6 at school in Zimbabwe.

His family fell victim to Robert Mugabe's expropriations against the country's white landowners. This prompted them to leave the country and move to Durban, South Africa. He moved to South Africa, where he attended Clifton Preparatory School before moving to Hilton College on a sports scholarship. Originally a fly half, as Negri grew in height he moved to the second row and then became a flanker.

== Professional career ==
He passed through the ranks at the youth teams of Natal and Western Province. After school, he joined the Western Province Academy, and played for them in the 2013 Under-19 Provincial Championship.

He moved to England in 2014 to study sports business management at Hartpury College, Gloucestershire, where he joined the rugby team.. He captained the team that won the BUCS super rugby in 2016-2017 against Exeter University.

After university, Negri signed a two-year deal with Italian Pro14 side Benetton prior to the 2017–2018 season.

== International career ==
He was noticed by Roland de Marigny, a former Italian-South African player, who recommended him to the Italian Federation. He was called up for the Italian Under-20s and took part in the 2013 World Youth Trophy in Chile, which Italy won. Negri represented Italy Under-20 nine times in 2013 and 2014. He progressed to the Emerging Italy team in 2015.

On 18 June 2016, while still in college, Negri debuted for the Italian national team in a victory over the United States in San Jose.

In 2018, he was used throughout the Six Nations, participating in all five matches.

Negri was named in Italy's final 31-man squad for the 2019 Rugby World Cup in Japan.

He was named in the Italy's 33-man squad for the 2023 Rugby World Cup in France. He reached his 50th Cap for Italy playing against Uruguay during the group stages.
