= Riccardo Favretto =

Italy international rugby union player

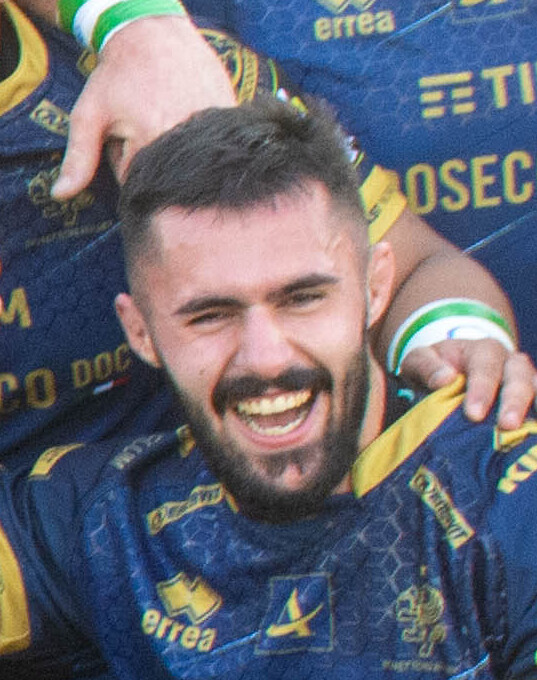
- Favretto in 2023
- Born: 18 October 2001 (age 25) Treviso, Italy
- Height: 2.00 m (6 ft 7 in)
- Weight: 110 kg (17 st 5 lb; 243 lb)

Rugby union career
- Position: Lock
- Current team: Benetton
Youth career
- Silea Rugby
- Mogliano
- Casale
- 2018−2019: Benetton
Senior career
Years	Team	Apps	(Points)
2019−2021	Mogliano	8	(0)
2020−2021	→Benetton	14	(5)
2021−	Benetton	69	(5)
- Correct as of 29 Aug 2026
International career
Years	Team	Apps	(Points)
2020	Italy Under 20	3	
2021−	Italy A	1	(0)
2021−	Italy	16	(0)
- Correct as of 29 Aug 2026

Riccardo Favretto (Treviso, 18 October 2001) is an Italian rugby union player who plays as a lock for Benetton in the United Rugby Championship.

Under contract with Mogliano, for the last matches of 2019–20 Pro14 season and for 2020–21 Pro14 season, he was named as Permit Player for Benetton.

In 2020, Favretto was named in the Italy Under-20 squad. Since March 2021, he has also been part of Italy squad. On 14 October 2021, he was selected by Alessandro Troncon to be part of a 28-man Italy A squad for the 2021 end-of-year rugby union internationals. On 13 January 2024, he was called in Italy Under-23 squad for test series against IRFU Combined Academies.
