= Daniele Rimpelli =

Italian rugby union player

- Born: 23 June 1997 (age 29) Reggio Emilia, Italy
- Height: 1.87 m (6 ft 2 in)
- Weight: 110 kg (17 st 5 lb; 243 lb)

Rugby union career
- Position: Prop
- Current team: Valorugby Emilia
Youth career
- Rugby Reggio
Senior career
Years	Team	Apps	(Points)
2015−2016	F.I.R. Academy		
2016−2018	Calvisano	35	(15)
2018	→Zebre	1	(0)
2018−2024	Zebre	58	(5)
2024−	Valorugby Emilia	1	(0)
- Correct as of 3 Dec 2022
International career
Years	Team	Apps	(Points)
2016−2017	Italy Under 20	15	(0)
2021	Italy	1	
- Correct as of 6 Feb 2021

Daniele Rimpelli (Reggio Emilia, 23 June 1997) is an Italian rugby union player. His usual position is as a Prop and he currently plays for Serie A Elite team Valorugby Emilia.

Under contract with Calvisano, for 2017–18 Pro14 season, he was named a Permit Player for Zebre in Pro 14. He played for Zebre Parma in United Rugby Championship from summer 2018 to January 2024.

In 2016 and 2017, Rimpelli was named in the Italy Under 20 squad.

From January 2021 he was named in Italy squad.
