= Cherif Traorè =

Italy international rugby union player

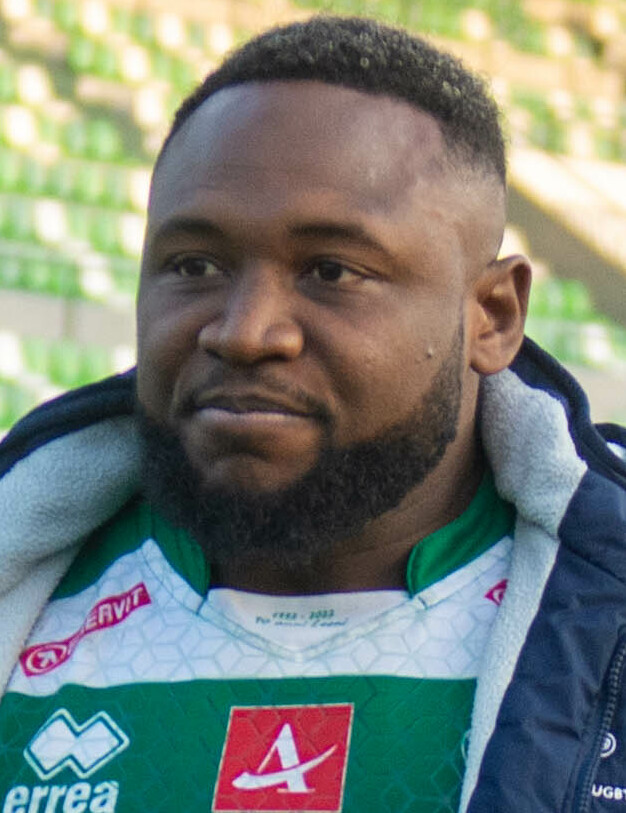
- Traorè in 2022
- Born: 10 April 1994 (age 32) Kindia, Guinea
- Height: 1.82 m (6 ft 0 in)
- Weight: 117 kg (18 st 6 lb; 258 lb)

Rugby union career
- Position: Prop
- Current team: Rugby Club Diok
Youth career
- 2010−2013: F.I.R. Academy
Senior career
Years	Team	Apps	(Points)
2013−2014	Cavalieri Prato	9	(0)
2014–2015	Viadana	12	(5)
2015–2023	Benetton	87	(10)
2023–2024	Stade Montois	2	(0)
2024–2025	Rangers Vicenza	16	(10)
2025–	Rugby Club Diok		
- Correct as of 1 Dec 2023
International career
Years	Team	Apps	(Points)
2012−2014	Italy Under 20	11	(0)
2018–2022	Italy	15	(5)
2021–2022	Italy A	2	(0)
- Correct as of 1 Jul 2022

Cherif Traorè (born 10 April 1994) is a Guinea-born Italian rugby union footballer. His usual position is as a prop.

== Background ==
Traorè was born in Kindia, Guinea. He has two brothers and a sister. His brothers Mohamed Lamine and Abdoulaye both play association football professionally. When Traorè was young, his father immigrated to Italy before bringing his family over to join him. Traorè was seven years old when he arrived in Italy. His father had emigrated to Europe earlier and "because he missed his wife and children so much, he decided to move us all over". Traorè arrived speaking French but had no knowledge of Italian or the country. He made friends at school who invited him to their homes and helped him adjust.

After passing through the Viadana youth academies, he was then selected for the F.I.R. Academy.

== Professional career ==
In 2013, he was hired by I Cavalieri Prato for whom he made his debut in the Italian championship of Excellence and in the European Challenge Cup. After a season in Prato, he returned to Viadana where he played in the 2014-2015 championship.

In 2015, Traorè was signed by Benetton Rugby for whom he made his debut in the Pro12 and in the European cup.

After a season in which he made 9 appearances in the Pro12 and Champions Cup, in December 2016, he was hindered by a shoulder injury that forced him to miss most of the season. Returning from injury after an operation, in the 2017-2018 season, he increased his playing time while almost always starting from the bench as a frontline change, scoring his first try in the Pro14 victory against the Southern Kings. In the following season, following his debut in the senior national team and though limited by an injury, he confirmed himself as a first team regular. He played for Benetton in the United Rugby Championship until 2022−23 season. For 2023–24 season, he signed for Stade Montois in French Pro D2.

== International career ==
Traorè was part of the Italy national under-20 rugby union team from 2012 to 2014. At the age of 19, the Parma player joined the Under 20s and participated in the Six Nations tournament in 2013 and 2014 and was called up for the editions of the world championship in the same years.

He has also been part of the Italy national team squad since 2018. After participating in training for the 2018 Six Nations Championship, Traorè was called up by technical commissioner Conor O'Shea for the summer tour of the Italy national team in Japan where he made his international debut, replacing Andrea Lovotti in the victory against Japan on June 16 in Kobe. He then also played in all the autumn test matches.

On the 14 October 2021, he was selected by Alessandro Troncon to be part of an Italy A 28-man squad for the 2021 end-of-year rugby union internationals.
