= Scott Steele (rugby union) =

Scotland international rugby union player

- Born: 24 July 1993 (age 33) Dumfries, Scotland
- Height: 1.75 m (5 ft 9 in)
- Weight: 83 kg (183 lb; 13 st 1 lb)
- School: Dumfries Academy; Merchiston Castle School

Rugby union career
- Position: Scrum half
Senior career
| Years | Team | Apps | (Points) |
| 2011–2014 | Leicester Tigers | 5 | (0) |
| 2014–2020 | London Irish | 117 | (110) |
| 2020–2023 | Harlequins | 31 | (40) |
| 2023 | → London Scottish (loan) | ? | (?) |
| 2023– | Edinburgh Rugby | 0 | (0) |
- Correct as of 18 May 2023
International career
| Years | Team | Apps | (Points) |
| 2011–2013 | Scotland U20 | 9 | (10) |
| 2020–2021 | Scotland | 4 | (5) |
- Correct as of 18 May 2023

Scott Steele (born 24 July 1993 in Dumfries, Scotland) is a Scottish rugby union player who currently plays for Edinburgh Rugby in the United Rugby Championship.

== Rugby Union career ==
=== Amateur career ===
Steele began his rugby union career with Dumfries Saints.

=== Professional career ===
In 2011, Steele was playing with the Scotland Under 18s when his team-mate Corey Venus told him that Leicester Tigers needed a scrum half. Steele enquired and landed a trial, then an academy contract, and then a two-year deal with the Tigers.

He was signed by London Irish in 2014. On 1 March 2016 it was announced that Steele had signed a two-year contract extension which would see him remain at London Irish until the end of the 2017-18 season. He was released ahead of the 2020–21 season.

He joined Harlequins in July 2020.

=== International career ===
Steele has represented Scotland at under-17, under-18 and under-20 level. He was named in the senior Scotland squad for the 2020 Six Nations match against Wales. He came off the bench to play on the Wing in a 14-10 win for Scotland.

== Football career ==
He has also played pro youth football for Kilmarnock.
