= 2024 Six Nations Championship =

International rugby union competition

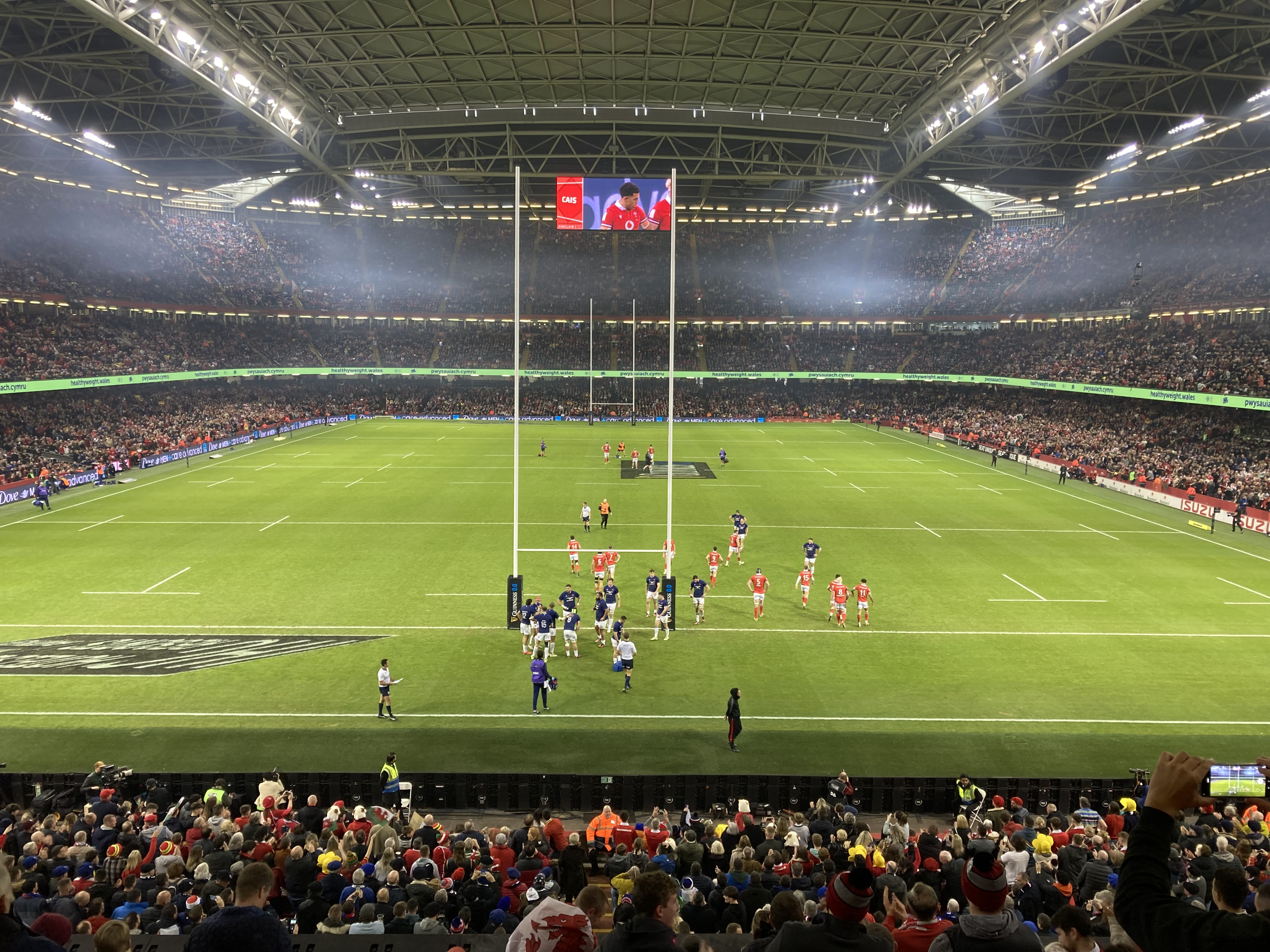
- Principality Stadium, Cardiff for the Six Nations 2024
- Date: 2 February – 16 March 2024
- Countries: England; France; Ireland; Italy; Scotland; Wales

Tournament statistics
- Champions: Ireland (16th title)
- Matches played: 15
- Attendance: 982,687 (65,512 per match)
- Tries scored: 79 (5.27 per match)
- Top point scorer: (France) Thomas Ramos (63)
- Top try scorers: (Ireland) Dan Sheehan (Scotland) Duhan van der Merwe (5)
- Player of the tournament: (Italy) Tommaso Menoncello

The 2024 Six Nations Championship (known as the Guinness Men's Six Nations for sponsorship reasons) was a rugby union competition that took place in February and March 2024, and featured the men's national teams of England, France, Ireland, Italy, Scotland and Wales. It was the 130th season of the competition (including its incarnations as the Home Nations Championship and the Five Nations Championship), but the 25th since it expanded to become the Six Nations Championship in 2000. It started on 2 February 2024 with a Friday night match between France and Ireland, and concluded with France against England on 16 March. France played their home fixtures away from their normal venue, the Stade de France in Saint-Denis, as the stadium was being prepared for use in the 2024 Summer Olympics later in the year.

Ireland entered the competition as reigning champions, having won the Grand Slam for the fourth time in 2023. They retained the championship – the third time they had won back-to-back championships, having done so previously in 1949 and 2015 – but did not secure a second successive Grand Slam. Wales finished bottom of the table, and was also the only team not to win any of their five matches.

== Participants ==
Nation	Stadium			Coach	Captain	World Rugby Ranking	
Nation	Home stadium	Capacity	Location	Coach	Captain	Start (Note: As of 29 January 2024)	End (Note: As of 18 March 2024)
England	Twickenham Stadium	82,000	London	(England) Steve Borthwick	Jamie George	5th	5th
France	Stade Vélodrome	67,394	Marseille (vs Ireland)	(France) Fabien Galthié	Grégory Alldritt	4th	4th
France	Parc Olympique Lyonnais	59,186	Décines-Charpieu (vs England)	(France) Fabien Galthié	Grégory Alldritt	4th	4th
France	Stade Pierre-Mauroy	50,186	Villeneuve-d'Ascq (vs Italy)	(France) Fabien Galthié	Grégory Alldritt	4th	4th
Ireland	Aviva Stadium	51,700	Dublin	(England) Andy Farrell	Peter O'Mahony	2nd	2nd
Italy	Stadio Olimpico	73,261	Rome	(Argentina) Gonzalo Quesada	Michele Lamaro	11th	8th
Scotland	Murrayfield Stadium	67,144	Edinburgh	(Scotland) Gregor Townsend	Rory Darge	6th	6th
Scotland	Murrayfield Stadium	67,144	Edinburgh	(Scotland) Gregor Townsend	Finn Russell	6th	6th
Wales	Millennium Stadium	73,931	Cardiff	(New Zealand) Warren Gatland	Dafydd Jenkins	8th	10th

== Table ==
Pos	Team	Pld	W	D	L	PF	PA	PD	TF	TA	GS	TB	LB	Pts	IRE	FRA	ENG	SCO	ITA	WAL
1	Ireland	5	4	0	1	144	60	+84	19	7	0	3	1	20	—			17–13	36–0	31–7
2	France	5	3	1	1	128	122	+6	13	14	0	1	0	15	17–38	—	33–31		13–13	
3	England	5	3	0	2	118	123	−5	13	13	0	1	1	14	23–22		—			16–14
4	Scotland	5	2	0	3	115	115	0	12	13	0	1	3	12		16–20	30–21	—		
5	Italy	5	2	1	2	92	126	−34	9	16	0	0	1	11			24–27	31–29	—	
6	Wales	5	0	0	5	92	143	−51	13	16	0	1	3	4		24–45		26–27	21–24	—

Source: Six Nations Rugby
Legend: Blue = home team win; Yellow = draw; Red = away team win.

Table ranking rules

- Four points are awarded for a win.
- Two points are awarded for a draw.
- A bonus point is awarded to a team that scores four or more tries, or loses by seven points or fewer. If a team scores four or more tries, and loses by seven points or fewer, they are awarded both bonus points.
- Three bonus points are awarded to a team that wins all five of their matches (a Grand Slam). This ensures that a Grand Slam winning team would top the table with at least 23 points, as there would otherwise be a scenario where a team could win all five matches with no bonus points for a total of 20 points and another team could win four matches with bonus points and lose their fifth match while claiming one or more bonus points giving a total of 21 or 22 points.
- Tiebreakers
  - If two or more teams are tied on table points, the team with the better points difference (points scored less points conceded) is ranked higher.
  - If the above tiebreaker fails to separate tied teams, the team that scores the higher number of total tries (including penalty tries) in their matches is ranked higher.
  - If two or more teams remain tied after applying the above tiebreakers then those teams will be placed at equal rank; if the tournament has concluded and more than one team is placed first then the title will be shared between them.

== Fixtures ==
The fixtures for the 2024 Six Nations were announced on 28 February 2023, beginning with France hosting Ireland in a Friday night clash at the Stade Vélodrome in Marseille on 2 February 2024. The final round of matches was played on 16 March 2024, beginning with Wales vs Italy, followed by Ireland vs Scotland and France vs England.

=== Round 1 ===
2 February 2024
21:00 CET (UTC+1)

France	17–38	Ireland (1 BP)
Try: Penaud 39' c Gabrillagues 52' c Con: Ramos (2/2) 40+1', 52'; Pen: Ramos (1/2) 26'	Report	Try: Gibson-Park 15' c Beirne 29' c Nash 45' c Sheehan 61' c Kelleher 77' c Con: Crowley (5/5) 17', 30', 46', 62', 78'; Pen: Crowley (1/2) 6'

Stade Vélodrome, Marseille
Attendance: 65,000
Referee: Karl Dickson (England)

FB	15	Thomas Ramos
RW	14	Damian Penaud
OC	13	Gaël Fickou
IC	12	Jonathan Danty		(substituted off) 63'
LW	11	Yoram Moefana
FH	10	Matthieu Jalibert
SH	9	Maxime Lucu		(substituted off) 63'
N8	8	Grégory Alldritt (c)
OF	7	Charles Ollivon		(substituted off) 63'
BF	6	François Cros		(substituted off) 63'
RL	5	Paul Willemse	(yellow card) 7' (red card) 30'
LL	4	Paul Gabrillagues		(substituted off) 52'
TP	3	Uini Atonio		(substituted off) 52'
HK	2	Peato Mauvaka		(substituted off) 52'
LP	1	Cyril Baille		(substituted off) 52'	(substituted on) 70'
Replacements:
HK	16	Julien Marchand		(substituted on) 52'
PR	17	Reda Wardi		(substituted on) 52'	(substituted off) 70'
PR	18	Dorian Aldegheri		(substituted on) 52'
LK	19	Posolo Tuilagi		(substituted on) 52'
LK	20	Cameron Woki		(substituted on) 63'
FL	21	Paul Boudehent		(substituted on) 63'
SH	22	Nolann Le Garrec		(substituted on) 63'
WG	23	Louis Bielle-Biarrey		(substituted on) 63'
Coach:
Fabien Galthié

FB	15	Hugo Keenan
RW	14	Calvin Nash		(substituted off) 79'
OC	13	Robbie Henshaw
IC	12	Bundee Aki
LW	11	James Lowe
FH	10	Jack Crowley
SH	9	Jamison Gibson-Park		(substituted off) 70'
N8	8	Caelan Doris
OF	7	Josh van der Flier		(substituted off) 63'
BF	6	Peter O'Mahony (c)	(yellow card) 52'	(substituted off) 63'
RL	5	Tadhg Beirne
LL	4	Joe McCarthy		(substituted off) 66'
TP	3	Tadhg Furlong		(substituted off) 63'
HK	2	Dan Sheehan		(substituted off) 63'
LP	1	Andrew Porter		8' to 18'		(substituted off) 63'
Replacements:
HK	16	Rónan Kelleher		(substituted on) 63'
PR	17	Cian Healy		(substituted on) 8'	(substituted off) 18'	(substituted on) 63'
PR	18	Finlay Bealham		(substituted on) 63'
LK	19	James Ryan		(substituted on) 66'
LK	20	Ryan Baird		(substituted on) 63'
N8	21	Jack Conan		(substituted on) 63'
SH	22	Conor Murray		(substituted on) 70'
CE	23	Ciarán Frawley		(substituted on) 79'
Coach:
Andy Farrell

Player of the Match:
Joe McCarthy (Ireland)

Assistant referees:
Matthew Carley (England)
Jordan Way (Australia)
Television match official:
Ben Whitehouse (Wales)
Foul play review officer:
Ian Tempest (England)

Notes:

- Romain Taofifénua was originally named among the replacements in the France squad; however, he was withdrawn the day before the match because of illness, and his place on the bench was taken by Posolo Tuilagi.
- Nolann Le Garrec and Posolo Tuilagi (both France) made their international debuts.
- This was Ireland's biggest ever away win over France (by both total points scored and margin of victory).
- This was France's heaviest home defeat in the competition in 110 years.

3 February 2024
15:15 CET (UTC+1)

(1 BP) Italy	24–27	England
Try: A. Garbisi 10' c Allan 25' c Ioane 80+4' c Con: Allan (2/2) 12', 26'; P. Garbisi (1/1) 80+5'; Pen: Allan (1/2) 4'	Report	Try: Daly 19' m Mitchell 44' c Con: Ford (1/2) 45'; Pen: Ford (5/5) 15', 32', 37', 53', 66'

Stadio Olimpico, Rome
Attendance: 57,000
Referee: Paul Williams (New Zealand)

FB	15	Tommaso Allan
RW	14	Lorenzo Pani		(substituted off) 68'
OC	13	Ignacio Brex
IC	12	Tommaso Menoncello
LW	11	Monty Ioane
FH	10	Paolo Garbisi
SH	9	Alessandro Garbisi		(substituted off) 52'
N8	8	Lorenzo Cannone		(substituted off) 45'
OF	7	Michele Lamaro (c)	(yellow card) 79'
BF	6	Sebastian Negri		(substituted off) 66'
RL	5	Federico Ruzza		(substituted off) 72'
LL	4	Niccolò Cannone
TP	3	Pietro Ceccarelli		(substituted off) 45'
HK	2	Gianmarco Lucchesi		(substituted off) 52'
LP	1	Danilo Fischetti		(substituted off) 66'
Replacements:
HK	16	Giacomo Nicotera		(substituted on) 52'
PR	17	Mirco Spagnolo		(substituted on) 66'
PR	18	Giosuè Zilocchi		(substituted on) 45'
LK	19	Andrea Zambonin		(substituted on) 72'
FL	20	Alessandro Izekor		(substituted on) 66'
FL	21	Manuel Zuliani		(substituted on) 45'
SH	22	Stephen Varney		(substituted on) 52'
CE	23	Federico Mori		(substituted on) 68'
Coach:
Gonzalo Quesada

FB	15	Freddie Steward
RW	14	Tommy Freeman		(substituted off) 77'
OC	13	Henry Slade
IC	12	Fraser Dingwall
LW	11	Elliot Daly	(yellow card) 75'
FH	10	George Ford		(substituted off) 66'
SH	9	Alex Mitchell		(substituted off) 58'
N8	8	Ben Earl
OF	7	Sam Underhill		(substituted off) 66'
BF	6	Ethan Roots
RL	5	Ollie Chessum		(substituted off) 72'
LL	4	Maro Itoje
TP	3	Will Stuart		(substituted off) 55'
HK	2	Jamie George (c)		(substituted off) 73'
LP	1	Joe Marler		(substituted off) 75'
Replacements:
HK	16	Theo Dan		(substituted on) 73'
PR	17	Beno Obano		(substituted on) 75'
PR	18	Dan Cole		(substituted on) 55'
LK	19	Alex Coles		(substituted on) 72'
FL	20	Chandler Cunningham-South		(substituted on) 66'
SH	21	Danny Care		(substituted on) 58'
FH	22	Fin Smith		(substituted on) 66'
WG	23	Immanuel Feyi-Waboso		(substituted on) 77'
Coach:
Steve Borthwick

Player of the Match:
Ethan Roots (England)

Assistant referees:
Nic Berry (Australia)
Nika Amashukeli (Georgia)
Television match official:
Brett Cronan (Australia)
Foul play review officer:
Eric Gauzins (France)

Notes:

- Ange Capuozzo was originally named in the starting line-up for Italy; however, he was withdrawn the day before the match because of illness. He was replaced by Lorenzo Pani, whose place on the bench was taken by Federico Mori.
- Edoardo Iachizzi was originally named among the replacements for Italy; however, he was withdrawn the day of the match because of injury, and his place on the bench was taken by Alessandro Izekor.
- Ellis Genge was originally named among the replacements for England; however, he was withdrawn the day of the match because of a foot injury, and his place on the bench was taken by Beno Obano.
- Federico Ruzza (Italy) earned his 50th test cap.
- Alessandro Izekor, Mirco Spagnolo (both Italy), Chandler Cunningham-South, Fraser Dingwall, Immanuel Feyi-Waboso, Ethan Roots and Fin Smith (all England) made their international debuts.
- The final score was the narrowest ever margin in a test match between England and Italy, and also Italy's highest points total against England.

3 February 2024
16:45 GMT (UTC+0)

(2 BP) Wales	26–27	Scotland
Try: Botham 47' m Dyer 52' c Wainwright 60' c Mann 68' c Con: I. Lloyd (3/4) 53', 61', 69'	Report	Try: Schoeman 10' c Van der Merwe (2) 29' c, 42' c Con: Russell (3/3) 11', 30', 43'; Pen: Russell (2/2) 6', 22'

Millennium Stadium, Cardiff
Attendance: 74,500
Referee: Ben O'Keeffe (New Zealand)

FB	15	Cameron Winnett
RW	14	Josh Adams
OC	13	Owen Watkin	(substituted off) 52'
IC	12	Nick Tompkins
LW	11	Rio Dyer
FH	10	Sam Costelow	(substituted off) 36'
SH	9	Gareth Davies	(substituted off) 41'
N8	8	Aaron Wainwright
OF	7	Tommy Reffell
BF	6	James Botham	(substituted off) 49'
RL	5	Adam Beard	49' to 55'		(substituted off) 72'
LL	4	Dafydd Jenkins (c)
TP	3	Leon Brown	(substituted off) 41'
HK	2	Ryan Elias	(substituted off) 41'
LP	1	Corey Domachowski
Replacements:
HK	16	Elliot Dee	(substituted on) 41'
PR	17	Kemsley Mathias
PR	18	Keiron Assiratti	(substituted on) 41'
LK	19	Teddy Williams	(substituted on) 49'	(substituted off) 55'	(substituted on) 72'
FL	20	Alex Mann	(substituted on) 49'
SH	21	Tomos Williams	(substituted on) 41'
FH	22	Ioan Lloyd	(substituted on) 36'
CE	23	Mason Grady	(substituted on) 52'
Coach:
Warren Gatland

FB	15	Kyle Rowe
RW	14	Kyle Steyn
OC	13	Huw Jones
IC	12	Sione Tuipulotu	(yellow card) 60'
LW	11	Duhan van der Merwe
FH	10	Finn Russell (c)
SH	9	Ben White		(substituted off) 70'
N8	8	Matt Fagerson
OF	7	Jamie Ritchie		(substituted off) 62'
BF	6	Luke Crosbie		(substituted off) 51'	(substituted on) 59'	(substituted off) 72'
RL	5	Scott Cummings
LL	4	Richie Gray		(substituted off) 32'
TP	3	Zander Fagerson		(substituted off) 70'
HK	2	George Turner	(yellow card) 47'			(substituted off) 70'
LP	1	Pierre Schoeman		(substituted off) 62'
Replacements:
HK	16	Ewan Ashman		(substituted on) 51'	(substituted off) 59'	(substituted on) 70'
PR	17	Alec Hepburn		(substituted on) 62'
PR	18	Elliot Millar-Mills		(substituted on) 70'
LK	19	Sam Skinner		(substituted on) 32'
N8	20	Jack Dempsey		(substituted on) 62'
SH	21	George Horne		(substituted on) 70'
FH	22	Ben Healy
CE	23	Cameron Redpath				(substituted on) 72'
Coach:
Gregor Townsend

Player of the Match:
Aaron Wainwright (Wales)

Assistant referees:
James Doleman (New Zealand)
Angus Mabey (New Zealand)
Television match official:
Brendon Pickerill (New Zealand)
Foul play review officer:
Brian MacNeice (Ireland)

Notes:

- Alex Mann, Cameron Winnett (both Wales) and Elliot Millar-Mills (Scotland) made their international debuts; Alec Hepburn made his debut for Scotland, having previously played six times for England.
- This was Scotland's first win at the Millennium Stadium for 22 years. Their previous victory in Cardiff (27–22) occurred on 6 April 2002.
- Scotland retained the Doddie Weir Cup.

=== Round 2 ===
10 February 2024
14:15 GMT (UTC+0)

(1 BP) Scotland	16–20	France
Try: White 7' c Con: Russell (1/1) 8'; Pen: Russell (3/3) 21', 29', 57'	Report	Try: Fickou 30' c Bielle-Biarrey 69' c Con: Ramos (2/2) 32', 71'; Pen: Ramos (2/2) 11', 76'

Murrayfield Stadium, Edinburgh
Attendance: 67,144
Referee: Nic Berry (Australia)

FB	15	Harry Paterson
RW	14	Kyle Rowe
OC	13	Huw Jones	(substituted off) 76'
IC	12	Sione Tuipulotu
LW	11	Duhan van der Merwe
FH	10	Finn Russell (cc)
SH	9	Ben White
N8	8	Jack Dempsey
OF	7	Rory Darge (cc)
BF	6	Matt Fagerson	(substituted off) 41'
RL	5	Scott Cummings
LL	4	Grant Gilchrist	(substituted off) 74'
TP	3	Zander Fagerson
HK	2	George Turner	16' to 27'		(substituted off) 68'
LP	1	Pierre Schoeman	(substituted off) 71'
Replacements:
HK	16	Ewan Ashman	(substituted on) 16'	(substituted off) 27'	(substituted on) 68'
PR	17	Alec Hepburn	(substituted on) 71'
PR	18	Elliot Millar-Mills
LK	19	Sam Skinner	(substituted on) 74'
FL	20	Andy Christie	(substituted on) 41'
SH	21	George Horne
FH	22	Ben Healy
CE	23	Cameron Redpath	(substituted on) 76'
Coach:
Gregor Townsend

FB	15	Thomas Ramos
RW	14	Damian Penaud
OC	13	Gaël Fickou
IC	12	Jonathan Danty		(substituted off) 62'
LW	11	Louis Bielle-Biarrey		(substituted off) 37'	(substituted on) 48'
FH	10	Matthieu Jalibert
SH	9	Maxime Lucu		(substituted off) 49'
N8	8	Grégory Alldritt (c)		(substituted off) 49'
OF	7	Charles Ollivon
BF	6	François Cros
RL	5	Paul Gabrillagues		(substituted off) 48'
LL	4	Cameron Woki		(substituted off) 48'
TP	3	Uini Atonio	(yellow card) 37'			(substituted off) 57'
HK	2	Peato Mauvaka		(substituted off) 48'
LP	1	Cyril Baille		(substituted off) 57'
Replacements:
HK	16	Julien Marchand		(substituted on) 48'
PR	17	Sébastien Taofifénua		(substituted on) 57'
PR	18	Dorian Aldegheri		(substituted on) 37'	(substituted off) 48'	(substituted on) 57'
LK	19	Posolo Tuilagi		(substituted on) 48'
FL	20	Alexandre Roumat		(substituted on) 48'
FL	21	Paul Boudehent		(substituted on) 49'
SH	22	Nolann Le Garrec		(substituted on) 49'
CE	23	Yoram Moefana		(substituted on) 62'
Coach:
Fabien Galthié

Player of the Match:
Gaël Fickou (France)

Assistant referees:
Nika Amashukeli (Georgia)
Jordan Way (Australia)
Television match official:
Brian MacNeice (Ireland)
Foul play review officer:
Ben Whitehouse (Wales)

Notes:

- Kyle Steyn was originally named in the starting line-up for Scotland; however, he was withdrawn on the day of the match for personal reasons. He was replaced on the wing by Kyle Rowe, whose place at full-back was taken by Harry Paterson.
- Harry Paterson (Scotland) and Alexandre Roumat (France) made their international debuts.
- Damian Penaud (France) earned his 50th test cap.
- France retained the Auld Alliance Trophy, and became the first of the two nations to win it on three consecutive occasions.

10 February 2024
16:45 GMT (UTC+0)

England	16–14	Wales (1 BP)
Try: Earl 19' m Dingwall 62' m Pen: Ford (2/2) 47', 71'	Report	Try: Penalty try 16'; Mann 37' c Con: I. Lloyd (1/1) 38'

Twickenham Stadium, London
Attendance: 81,596
Referee: James Doleman (New Zealand)

FB	15	Freddie Steward
RW	14	Tommy Freeman
OC	13	Henry Slade
IC	12	Fraser Dingwall
LW	11	Elliot Daly
FH	10	George Ford
SH	9	Alex Mitchell		(substituted off) 68'
N8	8	Ben Earl
OF	7	Sam Underhill		(substituted off) 63'
BF	6	Ethan Roots	(yellow card) 16'			(substituted off) 72'
RL	5	Ollie Chessum	(yellow card) 10'	23' to 34'
LL	4	Maro Itoje
TP	3	Will Stuart		(substituted off) 51'
HK	2	Jamie George (c)		(substituted off) 71'
LP	1	Joe Marler		(substituted off) 51'
Replacements:
HK	16	Theo Dan		(substituted on) 71'
PR	17	Ellis Genge		(substituted on) 51'
PR	18	Dan Cole		(substituted on) 51'
LK	19	Alex Coles		(substituted on) 23'	(substituted off) 34'	(substituted on) 72'
FL	20	Chandler Cunningham-South		(substituted on) 63'
SH	21	Danny Care		(substituted on) 68'
FH	22	Fin Smith
WG	23	Immanuel Feyi-Waboso
Coach:
Steve Borthwick

FB	15	Cameron Winnett
RW	14	Josh Adams		(substituted off) 60'
OC	13	George North
IC	12	Nick Tompkins
LW	11	Rio Dyer
FH	10	Ioan Lloyd		(substituted off) 80'
SH	9	Tomos Williams		(substituted off) 72'
N8	8	Aaron Wainwright
OF	7	Tommy Reffell
BF	6	Alex Mann		(substituted off) 68'
RL	5	Adam Beard		(substituted off) 68'
LL	4	Dafydd Jenkins (c)
TP	3	Keiron Assiratti		(substituted off) 54'	(substituted on) 80'
HK	2	Elliot Dee		(substituted off) 54'
LP	1	Gareth Thomas		(substituted off) 58'
Replacements:
HK	16	Ryan Elias		(substituted on) 54'
PR	17	Corey Domachowski		(substituted on) 58'
PR	18	Archie Griffin		(substituted on) 54'	(substituted off) 80'
LK	19	Will Rowlands		(substituted on) 68'
FL	20	Taine Basham		(substituted on) 68'
SH	21	Kieran Hardy		(substituted on) 72'
FH	22	Cai Evans		(substituted on) 80'
CE	23	Mason Grady	(yellow card) 70'	(substituted on) 60'
Coach:
Warren Gatland

Player of the Match:
Ben Earl (England)

Assistant referees:
Ben O'Keeffe (New Zealand)
Hollie Davidson (Scotland)
Television match official:
Brendon Pickerill (New Zealand)
Foul play review officer:
Brett Cronan (Australia)

Notes:

- Archie Griffin (Wales) made his international debut.
- England recorded their largest ever second-half comeback in the Six Nations, and equalled their test match record for biggest half-time deficit overcome to secure victory (9 points; tied with their win against Argentina on 22 June 2002).
- Assistant referee Hollie Davidson became the first woman to be part of the on-field officiating team in a men's Six Nations match.

11 February 2024
15:00 WET (UTC+0)

(1 BP) Ireland	36–0	Italy
Try: Crowley 7' m Sheehan (2) 23' c, 49' m Conan 36' c Lowe 61' m Nash 77' c Con: Crowley (2/5) 24', 38'; Byrne (1/1) 78'	Report

Aviva Stadium, Dublin
Attendance: 51,700
Referee: Luke Pearce (England) (Note: Pierre Brousset (France) was initially scheduled to referee the match between Ireland and Italy, but was withdrawn due to injury. He was replaced by Luke Pearce (England).)

FB	15	Hugo Keenan	(substituted off) 55'
RW	14	Calvin Nash
OC	13	Robbie Henshaw	(substituted off) 63'
IC	12	Stuart McCloskey
LW	11	James Lowe
FH	10	Jack Crowley
SH	9	Craig Casey	(substituted off) 72'
N8	8	Jack Conan
OF	7	Caelan Doris (c)
BF	6	Ryan Baird	(substituted off) 65'
RL	5	James Ryan	(substituted off) 60'
LL	4	Joe McCarthy
TP	3	Finlay Bealham	(substituted off) 55'
HK	2	Dan Sheehan	(substituted off) 55'
LP	1	Andrew Porter	(substituted off) 55'
Replacements:
HK	16	Rónan Kelleher	(substituted on) 55'
PR	17	Jeremy Loughman	(substituted on) 55'
PR	18	Tom O'Toole	(substituted on) 55'
LK	19	Iain Henderson	(substituted on) 60'
FL	20	Josh van der Flier	(substituted on) 65'
SH	21	Jamison Gibson-Park	(substituted on) 72'
FH	22	Harry Byrne	(substituted on) 55'
WG	23	Jordan Larmour	(substituted on) 63'
Coach:
Andy Farrell

FB	15	Ange Capuozzo
RW	14	Lorenzo Pani		(substituted off) 57'
OC	13	Ignacio Brex
IC	12	Tommaso Menoncello	(yellow card) 57'
LW	11	Monty Ioane
FH	10	Paolo Garbisi
SH	9	Stephen Varney		(substituted off) 57'
N8	8	Michele Lamaro (c)
OF	7	Manuel Zuliani		(substituted off) 68'
BF	6	Alessandro Izekor
RL	5	Federico Ruzza		(substituted off) 63'
LL	4	Niccolò Cannone
TP	3	Pietro Ceccarelli		(substituted off) 41'
HK	2	Gianmarco Lucchesi		(substituted off) 56'
LP	1	Danilo Fischetti		(substituted off) 56'
Replacements:
HK	16	Giacomo Nicotera		(substituted on) 56'
PR	17	Mirco Spagnolo		(substituted on) 56'
PR	18	Giosuè Zilocchi		(substituted on) 41'
LK	19	Andrea Zambonin		(substituted on) 63'
FL	20	Ross Vintcent		(substituted on) 68'
SH	21	Martin Page-Relo		(substituted on) 57'
FH	22	Tommaso Allan
CE	23	Federico Mori		(substituted on) 57'
Coach:
Gonzalo Quesada

Player of the Match:
James Lowe (Ireland)

Assistant referees:
Mathieu Raynal (France)
Luc Ramos (France)
Television match official:
Eric Gauzins (France)
Foul play review officer:
Ian Tempest (England)

Notes:

- Ross Vintcent (Italy) made his international debut.
- Ireland recorded a clean sheet for the first time in the Six Nations era; their previous clean sheet in the tournament was within the Five Nations format in 1987, when they achieved a 17–0 victory against England.
- Italy failed to score a point against Ireland for the first time.

=== Round 3 ===
24 February 2024
14:15 WET (UTC+0)

(1 BP) Ireland	31–7	Wales
Try: Sheehan 20' c Lowe 31' c Frawley 66' c Beirne 80' c Con: Crowley (4/4) 21', 32', 67', 80'; Pen: Crowley (1/1) 6'	Report	Try: Penalty try 42'

Aviva Stadium, Dublin
Attendance: 51,700
Referee: Andrea Piardi (Italy)

FB	15	Ciarán Frawley
RW	14	Calvin Nash		(substituted off) 66'
OC	13	Robbie Henshaw
IC	12	Bundee Aki
LW	11	James Lowe
FH	10	Jack Crowley
SH	9	Jamison Gibson-Park		(substituted off) 70'
N8	8	Caelan Doris
OF	7	Josh van der Flier		(substituted off) 50'
BF	6	Peter O'Mahony (c)		(substituted off) 55'
RL	5	Tadhg Beirne	(yellow card) 42'
LL	4	Joe McCarthy		(substituted off) 55'
TP	3	Tadhg Furlong		(substituted off) 54'
HK	2	Dan Sheehan		(substituted off) 54'
LP	1	Andrew Porter		(substituted off) 72'
Replacements:
HK	16	Rónan Kelleher		(substituted on) 54'
PR	17	Cian Healy		(substituted on) 72'
PR	18	Oli Jager		(substituted on) 54'
LK	19	James Ryan	(yellow card) 76'	(substituted on) 55'
LK	20	Ryan Baird		(substituted on) 55'
N8	21	Jack Conan		(substituted on) 50'
SH	22	Conor Murray		(substituted on) 70'
CE	23	Stuart McCloskey		(substituted on) 66'
Coach:
Andy Farrell

FB	15	Cameron Winnett		(substituted off) 76'
RW	14	Josh Adams	(substituted off) 57'
OC	13	George North
IC	12	Nick Tompkins
LW	11	Rio Dyer
FH	10	Sam Costelow	(substituted off) 72'	(substituted on) 76'
SH	9	Tomos Williams	(substituted off) 66'
N8	8	Aaron Wainwright
OF	7	Tommy Reffell
BF	6	Alex Mann	(substituted off) 54'
RL	5	Adam Beard	(substituted off) 54'
LL	4	Dafydd Jenkins (c)
TP	3	Keiron Assiratti	(substituted off) 50'
HK	2	Elliot Dee	(substituted off) 59'
LP	1	Gareth Thomas	(substituted off) 59'	(substituted on) 67'
Replacements:
HK	16	Ryan Elias	(substituted on) 59'
PR	17	Corey Domachowski	(substituted on) 59'	(substituted off) 67'
PR	18	Dillon Lewis	(substituted on) 50'
LK	19	Will Rowlands	(substituted on) 54'
N8	20	Mackenzie Martin	(substituted on) 54'
SH	21	Kieran Hardy	(substituted on) 66'
FH	22	Ioan Lloyd	(substituted on) 72'
CE	23	Mason Grady	(substituted on) 57'
Coach:
Warren Gatland

Player of the Match:
Bundee Aki (Ireland)

Assistant referees:
Karl Dickson (England)
Gianluca Gnecchi (Italy)
Television match official:
Eric Gauzins (France)
Foul play review officer:
Stuart Terheege (England)

Notes:

- Oli Jager (Ireland) and Mackenzie Martin (Wales) made their international debuts.
- Ireland equalled England's record of 11 consecutive wins in the Six Nations set between 2015 and 2017.
- Andrea Piardi became the first Italian to officiate as referee in the Six Nations Championship.

24 February 2024
16:45 GMT (UTC+0)

Scotland	30–21	England
Try: Van der Merwe (3) 19' c, 29' c, 44' c Con: Russell (3/3) 20', 30', 46'; Pen: Russell (3/3) 34', 56', 65'	Report	Try: Furbank 4' c Feyi-Waboso 66' m Con: Ford (1/1) 6'; Pen: Ford (2/2) 14', 49'; Drop: Ford (1/1) 35'

Murrayfield Stadium, Edinburgh
Attendance: 67,144
Referee: Andrew Brace (Ireland)

FB	15	Blair Kinghorn
RW	14	Kyle Steyn
OC	13	Huw Jones
IC	12	Sione Tuipulotu		(substituted off) 40'
LW	11	Duhan van der Merwe	(yellow card) 78'
FH	10	Finn Russell (cc)
SH	9	Ben White		(substituted off) 63'
N8	8	Jack Dempsey
OF	7	Rory Darge (cc)
BF	6	Jamie Ritchie		(substituted off) 52'
RL	5	Scott Cummings
LL	4	Grant Gilchrist		(substituted off) 67'
TP	3	Zander Fagerson		(substituted off) 6'	(substituted on) 17'	(substituted off) 61'
HK	2	George Turner		(substituted off) 52'
LP	1	Pierre Schoeman		(substituted off) 61'
Replacements:
HK	16	Ewan Ashman		(substituted on) 52'
PR	17	Alec Hepburn		(substituted on) 61'
PR	18	Elliot Millar-Mills		(substituted on) 6'	(substituted off) 17'	(substituted on) 61'
LK	19	Sam Skinner		(substituted on) 67'
FL	20	Andy Christie		(substituted on) 52'
SH	21	George Horne		(substituted on) 63'
FH	22	Ben Healy			(substituted on) 72'	(substituted off) 75'
CE	23	Cameron Redpath		(substituted on) 40'	72' to 75'
Coach:
Gregor Townsend

FB	15	George Furbank
RW	14	Tommy Freeman
OC	13	Henry Slade	(substituted off) 61'
IC	12	Ollie Lawrence
LW	11	Elliot Daly
FH	10	George Ford	(substituted off) 61'
SH	9	Danny Care	(substituted off) 46'
N8	8	Ben Earl
OF	7	Sam Underhill	(substituted off) 55'
BF	6	Ethan Roots	(substituted off) 46'
RL	5	Ollie Chessum
LL	4	Maro Itoje
TP	3	Dan Cole	(substituted off) 55'
HK	2	Jamie George (c)	(substituted off) 67'
LP	1	Ellis Genge	(substituted off) 61'
Replacements:
HK	16	Theo Dan	(substituted on) 67'
PR	17	Joe Marler	(substituted on) 61'
PR	18	Will Stuart	(substituted on) 55'
LK	19	George Martin	(substituted on) 46'
FL	20	Chandler Cunningham-South	(substituted on) 55'
SH	21	Ben Spencer	(substituted on) 46'
FH	22	Fin Smith	(substituted on) 61'
WG	23	Immanuel Feyi-Waboso	(substituted on) 61'
Coach:
Steve Borthwick

Player of the Match:
Duhan van der Merwe (Scotland)

Assistant referees:
Chris Busby (Ireland)
Eoghan Cross (Ireland)
Television match official:
Marius Jonker (South Africa)
Foul play review officer:
Joy Neville (Ireland)

Notes:

- Duhan van der Merwe became the first Scottish player to score a hat-trick against England, and the first player to score a hat-trick against England in the Six Nations era.
- Scotland recorded their fourth consecutive victory over England, matching their longest winning streaks in the fixture, set in 1896 and 1972.
- Scotland retained the Calcutta Cup.

25 February 2024
16:00 CET (UTC+1)

France	13–13	Italy
Try: Ollivon 6' c Con: Ramos (1/1) 7'; Pen: Ramos (2/2) 13', 44'	Report	Try: Capuozzo 69' c Con: Garbisi (1/1) 70'; Pen: Page-Relo (1/1) 40+3'; Garbisi (1/2) 60'

Stade Pierre-Mauroy, Villeneuve-d'Ascq
Attendance: 50,000
Referee: Christophe Ridley (England)

FB	15	Thomas Ramos
RW	14	Damian Penaud
OC	13	Gaël Fickou
IC	12	Jonathan Danty	(red card) 40'
LW	11	Matthis Lebel
FH	10	Matthieu Jalibert		(substituted off) 36'
SH	9	Maxime Lucu		(substituted off) 48'
N8	8	François Cros
OF	7	Charles Ollivon (c)		(substituted off) 65'
BF	6	Paul Boudehent
RL	5	Posolo Tuilagi		(substituted off) 47'
LL	4	Cameron Woki		(substituted off) 48'
TP	3	Uini Atonio		(substituted off) 48'
HK	2	Peato Mauvaka		(substituted off) 48'
LP	1	Cyril Baille		(substituted off) 47'
Replacements:
HK	16	Julien Marchand		(substituted on) 48'
PR	17	Sébastien Taofifénua		(substituted on) 47'
PR	18	Dorian Aldegheri		(substituted on) 48'
LK	19	Romain Taofifénua		(substituted on) 47'
FL	20	Alexandre Roumat		(substituted on) 48'
FL	21	Esteban Abadie		(substituted on) 65'
SH	22	Nolann Le Garrec		(substituted on) 48'
CE	23	Yoram Moefana		(substituted on) 36'
Coach:
Fabien Galthié

FB	15	Ange Capuozzo
RW	14	Tommaso Menoncello
OC	13	Ignacio Brex
IC	12	Federico Mori	(substituted off) 65'
LW	11	Monty Ioane
FH	10	Paolo Garbisi
SH	9	Martin Page-Relo	(substituted off) 53'
N8	8	Ross Vintcent
OF	7	Michele Lamaro (c)
BF	6	Riccardo Favretto	(substituted off) 48'
RL	5	Federico Ruzza	(substituted off) 65'
LL	4	Niccolò Cannone
TP	3	Giosuè Zilocchi	(substituted off) 63'
HK	2	Giacomo Nicotera	(substituted off) 56'
LP	1	Danilo Fischetti	(substituted off) 56'
Replacements:
HK	16	Gianmarco Lucchesi	(substituted on) 56'
PR	17	Mirco Spagnolo	(substituted on) 56'
PR	18	Simone Ferrari	(substituted on) 63'
LK	19	Matteo Canali
LK	20	Andrea Zambonin	(substituted on) 65'
FL	21	Manuel Zuliani	(substituted on) 48'
SH	22	Stephen Varney	(substituted on) 53'
FH	23	Leonardo Marin	(substituted on) 65'
Coach:
Gonzalo Quesada

Player of the Match:
Tommaso Menoncello (Italy)

Assistant referees:
Matthew Carley (England)
Craig Evans (Wales)
Television match official:
Ian Tempest (England)
Foul play review officer:
Ben Whitehouse (Wales)

Notes:

- Louis Bielle-Biarrey was originally named in the starting line-up for France; however, he was withdrawn the day before the match due to a neck injury. He was replaced by Matthis Lebel.
- Esteban Abadie (France) made his international debut.
- This was the first ever draw between France and Italy across 49 test matches.

=== Round 4 ===
9 March 2024
15:15 CET (UTC+1)

Italy	31–29	Scotland (2 BP)
Try: Brex 15' c Lynagh 44' m Varney 58' c Con: P. Garbisi (2/3) 16', 59'; Pen: P. Garbisi (3/3) 2', 35', 73'; Page-Relo (1/1) 39'	Report	Try: Z. Fagerson 6' c Steyn 12' c Schoeman 28' m Skinner 78' c Con: Russell (3/4) 8', 13', 78'; Pen: Russell (1/1) 25'

Stadio Olimpico, Rome
Attendance: 69,800
Referee: Angus Gardner (Australia)

FB	15	Ange Capuozzo
RW	14	Louis Lynagh	(substituted off) 70'
OC	13	Ignacio Brex
IC	12	Tommaso Menoncello	(substituted off) 78'
LW	11	Monty Ioane
FH	10	Paolo Garbisi
SH	9	Martin Page-Relo	(substituted off) 51'
N8	8	Ross Vintcent
OF	7	Michele Lamaro (c)
BF	6	Sebastian Negri	(substituted off) 59'
RL	5	Federico Ruzza
LL	4	Niccolò Cannone	(substituted off) 73'
TP	3	Simone Ferrari	(substituted off) 51'
HK	2	Giacomo Nicotera	(substituted off) 51'
LP	1	Danilo Fischetti	(substituted off) 59'
Replacements:
HK	16	Gianmarco Lucchesi	(substituted on) 51'
PR	17	Mirco Spagnolo	(substituted on) 59'
PR	18	Giosuè Zilocchi	(substituted on) 51'
LK	19	Andrea Zambonin	(substituted on) 73'
N8	20	Lorenzo Cannone	(substituted on) 59'
SH	21	Stephen Varney	(substituted on) 51'
FH	22	Leonardo Marin	(substituted on) 78'
CE	23	Federico Mori	(substituted on) 70'
Coach:
Gonzalo Quesada

FB	15	Blair Kinghorn
RW	14	Kyle Steyn
OC	13	Huw Jones
IC	12	Cameron Redpath
LW	11	Duhan van der Merwe
FH	10	Finn Russell (cc)
SH	9	George Horne	(substituted off) 59'
N8	8	Jack Dempsey
OF	7	Rory Darge (cc)	(substituted off) 70'
BF	6	Andy Christie	(substituted off) 59'
RL	5	Scott Cummings
LL	4	Grant Gilchrist	(substituted off) 70'
TP	3	Zander Fagerson	(substituted off) 70'
HK	2	George Turner	(substituted off) 59'
LP	1	Pierre Schoeman	(substituted off) 59'
Replacements:
HK	16	Ewan Ashman	(substituted on) 59'
PR	17	Alec Hepburn	(substituted on) 59'
PR	18	Elliot Millar-Mills	(substituted on) 70'
LK	19	Sam Skinner	(substituted on) 70'
FL	20	Jamie Ritchie	(substituted on) 70'
N8	21	Matt Fagerson	(substituted on) 59'
SH	22	Ali Price	(substituted on) 59'
WG	23	Kyle Rowe
Coach:
Gregor Townsend

Player of the Match:
Ignacio Brex (Italy)

Assistant referees:
Karl Dickson (England)
Adam Leal (England)
Television match official:
Marius van der Westhuizen (South Africa)
Foul play review officer:
Eric Gauzins (France)

Notes:

- Louis Lynagh (Italy) made his international debut.
- This was Italy's first home victory in the Six Nations for 11 years, since defeating Ireland in 2013.
- Italy won against Scotland for the first time in 9 years, since their away win in 2015, and thereby claimed the Cuttitta Cup for the first time in history.

9 March 2024
16:45 GMT (UTC+0)

England	23–22	Ireland (1 BP)
Try: Lawrence 4' m Furbank 48' m Earl 60' c Con: M. Smith (1/1) 61'; Pen: Ford (1/2) 17'; Drop: M. Smith (1/1) 80+1'	Report	Try: Lowe (2) 44' m, 73' m Pen: Crowley (4/4) 3', 20', 35', 40+1'

Twickenham Stadium, London
Attendance: 81,686
Referee: Nika Amashukeli (Georgia)

FB	15	George Furbank
RW	14	Immanuel Feyi-Waboso
OC	13	Henry Slade	(substituted off) 66'
IC	12	Ollie Lawrence
LW	11	Tommy Freeman
FH	10	George Ford	(substituted off) 59'
SH	9	Alex Mitchell	(substituted off) 66'
N8	8	Ben Earl
OF	7	Sam Underhill	(substituted off) 61'
BF	6	Ollie Chessum	(substituted off) 66'
RL	5	George Martin
LL	4	Maro Itoje
TP	3	Dan Cole	(substituted off) 54'
HK	2	Jamie George (c)	(substituted off) 54'
LP	1	Ellis Genge	(substituted off) 54'
Replacements:
HK	16	Theo Dan	(substituted on) 54'
PR	17	Joe Marler	(substituted on) 54'
PR	18	Will Stuart	(substituted on) 54'
FL	19	Chandler Cunningham-South	(substituted on) 61'
N8	20	Alex Dombrandt	(substituted on) 66'
SH	21	Danny Care	(substituted on) 66'
FH	22	Marcus Smith	(substituted on) 59'
CE	23	Elliot Daly	(substituted on) 66'
Coach:
Steve Borthwick

FB	15	Hugo Keenan
RW	14	Calvin Nash		(substituted off) 6'
OC	13	Robbie Henshaw
IC	12	Bundee Aki
LW	11	James Lowe
FH	10	Jack Crowley
SH	9	Jamison Gibson-Park
N8	8	Caelan Doris
OF	7	Josh van der Flier		(substituted off) 61'
BF	6	Peter O'Mahony (c)	(yellow card) 58'	(substituted off) 69'
RL	5	Tadhg Beirne
LL	4	Joe McCarthy		(substituted off) 61'
TP	3	Tadhg Furlong		(substituted off) 61'
HK	2	Dan Sheehan		(substituted off) 61'
LP	1	Andrew Porter		(substituted off) 72'
Replacements:
HK	16	Rónan Kelleher		(substituted on) 61'
PR	17	Cian Healy		(substituted on) 72'
PR	18	Finlay Bealham		(substituted on) 61'
LK	19	Iain Henderson		(substituted on) 61'
LK	20	Ryan Baird		(substituted on) 69'
N8	21	Jack Conan		(substituted on) 61'
SH	22	Conor Murray			(substituted on) 51'
CE	23	Ciarán Frawley		(substituted on) 6'	(substituted off) 51'
Coach:
Andy Farrell

Player of the Match:
Ben Earl (England)

Assistant referees:
Andrea Piardi (Italy)
Craig Evans (Wales)
Television match official:
Ben Whitehouse (Wales)
Foul play review officer:
Marius Jonker (South Africa)

Notes:

- England reclaimed the Millennium Trophy for the first time since 2020.
- Danny Care (England) earned his 100th test cap, becoming the sixth England player to reach this milestone (after Jason Leonard, Ben Youngs, Owen Farrell, Dan Cole and Courtney Lawes).
- Chandler Cunningham-South left the field due to injury in the 78th minute; with no replacements remaining, England finished the match with 14 players.

10 March 2024
15:00 GMT (UTC+0)

Wales	24–45	France (1 BP)
Try: Dyer 8' c Williams 24' c Roberts 42' c Con: Costelow (3/3) 9', 25', 44'; Pen: Costelow (1/1) 1'	Report	Try: Fickou 21' c Le Garrec 28' c Colombe 64' c R. Taofifénua 68' c Lucu 80' m Con: Ramos (4/5) 22', 29', 65', 69'; Pen: Ramos (4/4) 6', 14', 60', 73'

Millennium Stadium, Cardiff
Attendance: 71,242
Referee: Luke Pearce (England)

FB	15	Cameron Winnett
RW	14	Josh Adams
OC	13	Joe Roberts	(substituted off) 60'
IC	12	Owen Watkin
LW	11	Rio Dyer
FH	10	Sam Costelow	(substituted off) 56'
SH	9	Tomos Williams	(substituted off) 56'
N8	8	Aaron Wainwright
OF	7	Tommy Reffell	(substituted off) 56'
BF	6	Dafydd Jenkins (c)
RL	5	Adam Beard
LL	4	Will Rowlands	(substituted off) 70'
TP	3	Keiron Assiratti	(substituted off) 44'
HK	2	Elliot Dee	(substituted off) 70'
LP	1	Gareth Thomas	(substituted off) 70'
Replacements:
HK	16	Evan Lloyd	(substituted on) 70'
PR	17	Corey Domachowski	(substituted on) 70'
PR	18	Dillon Lewis	(substituted on) 44'
N8	19	Mackenzie Martin	(substituted on) 70'
FL	20	Alex Mann	(substituted on) 56'
SH	21	Gareth Davies	(substituted on) 56'
FH	22	Ioan Lloyd	(substituted on) 56'
CE	23	Mason Grady	(substituted on) 60'
Coach:
Warren Gatland

FB	15	Léo Barré
RW	14	Damian Penaud
OC	13	Gaël Fickou
IC	12	Nicolas Depoortère	(substituted off) 72'
LW	11	Louis Bielle-Biarrey
FH	10	Thomas Ramos
SH	9	Nolann Le Garrec	(substituted off) 70'
N8	8	Grégory Alldritt (c)
OF	7	Charles Ollivon	(substituted off) 62'
BF	6	François Cros	(substituted off) 70'
RL	5	Emmanuel Meafou	(substituted off) 51'
LL	4	Thibaud Flament
TP	3	Uini Atonio	(substituted off) 51'
HK	2	Julien Marchand	(substituted off) 51'
LP	1	Cyril Baille	(substituted off) 51'
Replacements:
HK	16	Peato Mauvaka	(substituted on) 51'
PR	17	Sébastien Taofifénua	(substituted on) 51'
PR	18	Georges-Henri Colombe	(substituted on) 51'
LK	19	Romain Taofifénua	(substituted on) 51'
FL	20	Alexandre Roumat	(substituted on) 62'
FL	21	Paul Boudehent	(substituted on) 70'
SH	22	Maxime Lucu	(substituted on) 70'
CE	23	Yoram Moefana	(substituted on) 72'
Coach:
Fabien Galthié

Player of the Match:
Nolann Le Garrec (France)

Assistant referees:
Andrew Brace (Ireland)
Damian Schneider (Argentina)
Television match official:
Ian Tempest (England)
Foul play review officer:
Joy Neville (Ireland)

Notes:

- Ryan Elias was originally named in the starting line-up for Wales; however, he was withdrawn the day of match because of injury. He was replaced by Elliot Dee, whose place on the bench was taken by Evan Lloyd.
- Elliot Dee (Wales) earned his 50th test cap.
- Evan Lloyd (Wales), Léo Barré, Nicolas Depoortère, Georges-Henri Colombe and Emmanuel Meafou (all France) made their international debuts.

=== Round 5 ===
16 March 2024
14:15 GMT (UTC+0)

(1 BP) Wales	21–24	Italy
Try: Dee 64' c Rowlands 79' c Grady 80+2' c Con: Costelow (1/1) 65'; I. Lloyd (2/2) 80', 80+3'	Report	Try: Ioane 20' m Pani 46' c Con: P. Garbisi (1/2) 47'; Pen: P. Garbisi (3/3) 6', 13', 71'; Page-Relo (1/1) 74'

Millennium Stadium, Cardiff
Attendance: 72,121
Referee: Mathieu Raynal (France)

FB	15	Cameron Winnett
RW	14	Josh Adams
OC	13	George North
IC	12	Nick Tompkins	(substituted off) 49'
LW	11	Rio Dyer
FH	10	Sam Costelow	(substituted off) 74'
SH	9	Tomos Williams	(substituted off) 63'
N8	8	Aaron Wainwright
OF	7	Tommy Reffell
BF	6	Alex Mann	(substituted off) 58'
RL	5	Adam Beard	(substituted off) 52'
LL	4	Dafydd Jenkins (c)
TP	3	Dillon Lewis	(substituted off) 74'
HK	2	Elliot Dee	(substituted off) 74'
LP	1	Gareth Thomas	(substituted off) 74'
Replacements:
HK	16	Evan Lloyd	(substituted on) 74'
PR	17	Kemsley Mathias	(substituted on) 74'
PR	18	Harri O'Connor	(substituted on) 74'
LK	19	Will Rowlands	(substituted on) 52'
N8	20	Mackenzie Martin	(substituted on) 58'
SH	21	Kieran Hardy	(substituted on) 63'
FH	22	Ioan Lloyd	(substituted on) 74'
CE	23	Mason Grady	(substituted on) 49'
Coach:
Warren Gatland

FB	15	Lorenzo Pani
RW	14	Louis Lynagh
OC	13	Ignacio Brex
IC	12	Tommaso Menoncello
LW	11	Monty Ioane	(substituted off) 76'
FH	10	Paolo Garbisi
SH	9	Stephen Varney	(substituted off) 51'
N8	8	Lorenzo Cannone	(substituted off) 51'
OF	7	Michele Lamaro (c)
BF	6	Sebastian Negri	(substituted off) 61'
RL	5	Federico Ruzza
LL	4	Niccolò Cannone	(substituted off) 76'
TP	3	Simone Ferrari	(substituted off) 51'
HK	2	Giacomo Nicotera	30' to 41'		(substituted off) 58'
LP	1	Danilo Fischetti	(substituted off) 58'
Replacements:
HK	16	Gianmarco Lucchesi	(substituted on) 30'	(substituted off) 41'	(substituted on) 58'
PR	17	Mirco Spagnolo	(substituted on) 58'
PR	18	Giosuè Zilocchi	(substituted on) 51'
LK	19	Riccardo Favretto	(substituted on) 76'
FL	20	Ross Vintcent	(substituted on) 51'
FL	21	Manuel Zuliani	(substituted on) 61'
SH	22	Martin Page-Relo	(substituted on) 51'
FH	23	Leonardo Marin	(substituted on) 76'
Coach:
Gonzalo Quesada

Player of the Match:
Ignacio Brex (Italy)

Assistant referees:
Chris Busby (Ireland)
Morné Ferreira (South Africa)
Television match official:
Joy Neville (Ireland)
Foul play review officer:
Ian Tempest (England)

Notes:

- Wales received the Wooden Spoon after losing all five of their matches for the first time since 2003.
- Italy ended the tournament on 11 points, following two wins and a draw; their best ever performance in the Six Nations.
- Harri O'Connor (Wales) made his international debut.
- This was George North's 121st and final test cap before retirement, ending his international career as the most-capped Wales back in test history.
- George North left the field due to injury in the 79th minute; with no replacements remaining, Wales finished the match with 14 players.
- Andrea Zambonin was originally named among the replacements for Italy; however, he was withdrawn the day of the match because of illness, and his place on the bench was taken by Riccardo Favretto.

16 March 2024
16:45 WET (UTC+0)

Ireland	17–13	Scotland (1 BP)
Try: Sheehan 13' c Porter 64' c Con: Crowley (2/2) 14', 65'; Pen: Crowley (1/1) 42'	Report	Try: Jones 78'; Con: Russell (1/1) 78'; Pen: Russell (2/2) 7', 17'

Aviva Stadium, Dublin
Attendance: 51,700
Referee: Matthew Carley (England)

FB	15	Jordan Larmour		(substituted off) 67'
RW	14	Calvin Nash		(substituted off) 56'
OC	13	Robbie Henshaw
IC	12	Bundee Aki
LW	11	James Lowe
FH	10	Jack Crowley
SH	9	Jamison Gibson-Park		(substituted off) 69'
N8	8	Caelan Doris
OF	7	Josh van der Flier
BF	6	Peter O'Mahony (c)		(substituted off) 64'
RL	5	Tadhg Beirne
LL	4	Joe McCarthy		(substituted off) 55'
TP	3	Tadhg Furlong		(substituted off) 51'
HK	2	Dan Sheehan		(substituted off) 55'
LP	1	Andrew Porter		(substituted off) 67'
Replacements:
HK	16	Rónan Kelleher		(substituted on) 55'
PR	17	Cian Healy		(substituted on) 67'
PR	18	Finlay Bealham		(substituted on) 51'
LK	19	Ryan Baird		(substituted on) 55'
N8	20	Jack Conan		(substituted on) 64'
SH	21	Conor Murray		(substituted on) 69'
FH	22	Harry Byrne	(yellow card) 75'	(substituted on) 67'
CE	23	Garry Ringrose		(substituted on) 56'
Coach:
Andy Farrell

FB	15	Blair Kinghorn		(substituted off) 66'
RW	14	Kyle Steyn
OC	13	Huw Jones
IC	12	Stafford McDowall		(substituted off) 61'
LW	11	Duhan van der Merwe
FH	10	Finn Russell (cc)
SH	9	Ben White		(substituted off) 61'
N8	8	Jack Dempsey
OF	7	Rory Darge (cc)
BF	6	Andy Christie			(substituted off) 67'	(substituted on) 75'
RL	5	Scott Cummings		(substituted off) 70'
LL	4	Grant Gilchrist
TP	3	Zander Fagerson		(substituted off) 70'
HK	2	George Turner		(substituted off) 48'	(substituted on) 67'	(substituted off) 75'
LP	1	Pierre Schoeman		(substituted off) 48'
Replacements:
HK	16	Ewan Ashman	(yellow card) 63'	(substituted on) 48'
PR	17	Rory Sutherland		(substituted on) 48'
PR	18	Javan Sebastian		(substituted on) 70'
LK	19	Sam Skinner		(substituted on) 70'
N8	20	Matt Fagerson		(substituted on) 61'
SH	21	George Horne		(substituted on) 61'
CE	22	Cameron Redpath		(substituted on) 61'
WG	23	Kyle Rowe		(substituted on) 66'
Coach:
Gregor Townsend

Player of the Match:
Jamison Gibson-Park (Ireland)

Assistant referees:
Karl Dickson (England)
Christophe Ridley (England)
Television match official:
Marius Jonker (South Africa)
Foul play review officer:
Marius van der Westhuizen (South Africa)

Notes:

- Ireland retained the Six Nations Championship, winning back-to-back titles for the second time in the Six Nations era (after consecutive triumphs in 2014 and 2015).
- Hugo Keenan (Ireland) was originally named in the starting line-up for Ireland; however, he was withdrawn shortly before kick-off after sustaining an injury during the pre-match warm-up. He was replaced by Jordan Larmour.
- Tadhg Beirne (Ireland) earned his 50th test cap.

16 March 2024
21:00 CET (UTC+1)

France	33–31	England (2 BP)
Try: Le Garrec 20' c Barré 56' c Fickou 60' c Con: Ramos (3/3) 21', 57', 61'; Pen: Ramos (4/5) 17', 31', 35', 79'	Report	Try: Lawrence (2) 40+1' c, 42' c M. Smith 45' c Freeman 75' c Con: Ford (4/4) 40+2', 43', 47', 76'; Pen: Ford (1/1) 11'

Parc Olympique Lyonnais, Décines-Charpieu
Attendance: 60,000
Referee: Angus Gardner (Australia)

FB	15	Léo Barré
RW	14	Damian Penaud
OC	13	Gaël Fickou
IC	12	Nicolas Depoortère	(substituted off) 59'
LW	11	Louis Bielle-Biarrey
FH	10	Thomas Ramos
SH	9	Nolann Le Garrec	(substituted off) 66'
N8	8	Grégory Alldritt (c)	(substituted off) 69'
OF	7	Charles Ollivon	(substituted off) 61'
BF	6	François Cros
RL	5	Emmanuel Meafou	(substituted off) 47'
LL	4	Thibaud Flament
TP	3	Uini Atonio	(substituted off) 61'
HK	2	Julien Marchand	(substituted off) 47'
LP	1	Cyril Baille	(substituted off) 47'
Replacements:
HK	16	Peato Mauvaka	(substituted on) 47'
PR	17	Sébastien Taofifénua	(substituted on) 47'
PR	18	Georges-Henri Colombe	(substituted on) 61'
LK	19	Romain Taofifénua	(substituted on) 47'
FL	20	Alexandre Roumat	(substituted on) 61'
FL	21	Paul Boudehent	(substituted on) 69'
SH	22	Maxime Lucu	(substituted on) 66'
CE	23	Yoram Moefana	(substituted on) 59'
Coach:
Fabien Galthié

FB	15	George Furbank	(substituted off) 7'
RW	14	Tommy Freeman
OC	13	Henry Slade	(substituted off) 59'
IC	12	Ollie Lawrence
LW	11	Elliot Daly
FH	10	George Ford
SH	9	Alex Mitchell	(substituted off) 69'
N8	8	Ben Earl
OF	7	Sam Underhill	(substituted off) 66'
BF	6	Ollie Chessum	(substituted off) 54'
RL	5	George Martin
LL	4	Maro Itoje
TP	3	Dan Cole	(substituted off) 49'
HK	2	Jamie George (c)	(substituted off) 49'
LP	1	Ellis Genge	(substituted off) 49'
Replacements:
HK	16	Theo Dan	(substituted on) 49'
PR	17	Joe Marler	(substituted on) 49'
PR	18	Will Stuart	(substituted on) 49'
FL	19	Ethan Roots	(substituted on) 54'
N8	20	Alex Dombrandt	(substituted on) 66'
SH	21	Danny Care	(substituted on) 69'
FH	22	Marcus Smith	(substituted on) 7'
CE	23	Manu Tuilagi	(substituted on) 59'
Coach:
Steve Borthwick

Player of the Match:
Léo Barré (France)

Assistant referees:
Nika Amashukeli (Georgia)
Damian Schneider (Argentina)
Television match official:
Ben Whitehouse (Wales)
Foul play review officer:
Brian MacNeice (Ireland)

== Player statistics ==
=== Most points ===
As of 17 March 2024

Rank	Name	Team	Points
1	Thomas Ramos	France	63
2	Finn Russell	Scotland	55
3	Jack Crowley	Ireland	52
4	George Ford	England	48
5	Paolo Garbisi	Italy	31
6	Dan Sheehan	Ireland	25
6	Duhan van der Merwe	Scotland	25
8	James Lowe	Ireland	20
9	Gaël Fickou	France	15
9	Ollie Lawrence	England	15

=== Most tries ===
As of 17 March 2024

Rank	Name	Team	Tries
1	Dan Sheehan	Ireland	5
1	Duhan van der Merwe	Scotland	5
3	James Lowe	Ireland	4
4	Gaël Fickou	France	3
4	Ollie Lawrence	England	3
6	9 players tied		2

== Discipline ==
=== Summary ===
Team	Yellow card	Red card	Total
England	3	0	3
France	2	2	4
Ireland	5	0	5
Italy	2	0	2
Scotland	4	0	4
Wales	1	0	1

=== Yellow cards ===
2 yellow cards

- (Ireland) Peter O'Mahony (vs. France, vs. England)

1 yellow card

- (England) Ollie Chessum (vs. Wales)
- (England) Elliot Daly (vs. Italy)
- (England) Ethan Roots (vs. Wales)
- (France) Uini Atonio (vs. Scotland)
- (France) Paul Willemse (vs. Ireland)
- (Ireland) Tadhg Beirne (vs. Wales)
- (Ireland) Harry Byrne (vs. Scotland)
- (Ireland) James Ryan (vs. Wales)
- (Italy) Michele Lamaro (vs. England)
- (Italy) Tommaso Menoncello (vs. Ireland)
- (Scotland) Ewan Ashman (vs. Ireland)
- (Scotland) Sione Tuipulotu (vs. Wales)
- (Scotland) George Turner (vs. Wales)
- (Scotland) Duhan van der Merwe (vs. England)
- (Wales) Mason Grady (vs. England)

=== Red cards ===
1 red card

- (France) Jonathan Danty (vs. Italy)
- (France) Paul Willemse (vs. Ireland)

=== Citings/bans ===
Player	Match	Citing date	Law breached	Result	Ref
Paul Willemse	**France** vs. Ireland	6 February 2024	9.13 – Dangerous Tackling (Red card)	3-match ban (Note: The suspension is reduced by one match, subject to the player's completion of the World Rugby Coaching Intervention Programme.)	
Jonathan Danty	**France** vs. Italy	25 February 2024	9.13 – Dangerous Tackling (Red card)	4-match ban	

Note: The cited player's team is listed in bold italics.

== Awards ==
=== Player of the Match awards ===
Awards	Player	Team	Opponent
2	Ben Earl	England	Wales ^{(R2)}
2	Ben Earl	England	Ireland ^{(R4)}
2	Ignacio Brex	Italy	Scotland ^{(R4)}
2	Ignacio Brex	Italy	Wales ^{(R5)}
1	Ethan Roots	England	Italy ^{(R1)}
1	Léo Barré	France	England ^{(R5)}
1	Gaël Fickou	France	Scotland ^{(R2)}
1	Nolann Le Garrec	France	Wales ^{(R4)}
1	Bundee Aki	Ireland	Wales ^{(R3)}
1	Jamison Gibson-Park	Ireland	Scotland ^{(R5)}
1	James Lowe	Ireland	Italy ^{(R2)}
1	Joe McCarthy	Ireland	France ^{(R1)}
1	Tommaso Menoncello	Italy	France ^{(R3)}
1	Duhan van der Merwe	Scotland	England ^{(R3)}
1	Aaron Wainwright	Wales	Scotland ^{(R1)}

=== Player of the Championship ===
Four players were nominated for the 2024 Six Nations Player of the Championship on 19 March 2024. The winner was announced on 5 April 2024.

Team	Nominee	Position	Winner
England	Ben Earl	Number 8	(Italy) Tommaso Menoncello
Ireland	Bundee Aki	Centre	(Italy) Tommaso Menoncello
Italy	Tommaso Menoncello	Centre	(Italy) Tommaso Menoncello
Scotland	Duhan van der Merwe	Wing	(Italy) Tommaso Menoncello

=== Try of the Championship ===
Four tries were nominated for the 2024 Six Nations Try of the Championship on 22 March 2024. The winner was announced on 3 April 2024.

Team	Nominee	Try	Winner
France	Nolann Le Garrec	vs. England	(Italy) Lorenzo Pani
Ireland	Calvin Nash	vs. Italy	(Italy) Lorenzo Pani
Italy	Lorenzo Pani	vs. Wales	(Italy) Lorenzo Pani
Scotland	Duhan van der Merwe	vs. England	(Italy) Lorenzo Pani

=== Team of the Championship ===
The 15 players voted in as the 2024 Six Nations Team of the Championship were announced on 5 April 2024.

Forwards
No.	Team	Player
1	Ireland	Andrew Porter
2	Ireland	Dan Sheehan
3	France	Uini Atonio
4	Ireland	Tadhg Beirne
5	Ireland	Joe McCarthy
6	Ireland	Caelan Doris
7	Italy	Michele Lamaro
8	England	Ben Earl

Backs
No.	Team	Player
9	Ireland	Jamison Gibson-Park
10	Scotland	Finn Russell
11	Ireland	James Lowe
12	Italy	Tommaso Menoncello
13	Ireland	Bundee Aki
14	Scotland	Duhan van der Merwe
15	France	Thomas Ramos
