= Evan Lloyd (rugby union, born 2001) =

Welsh rugby union player

- Born: 28 December 2001 (age 24) Penarth, Wales
- Height: 1.85 m (6 ft 1 in)
- Weight: 115 kg (254 lb; 18 st 2 lb)
- School: Stanwell School

Rugby union career
- Position: Hooker
- Current team: Cardiff
Senior career
Years	Team	Apps	(Points)
2021	Pontypridd	2	(0)
2023–	Cardiff	30	(30)
International career
Years	Team	Apps	(Points)
2021	Wales U20	2	(0)
2024–	Wales	8	(0)

Evan Lloyd (born 28 December 2001) is a Welsh professional rugby union player who plays as a hooker for United Rugby Championship club Cardiff and the Wales national team.

== Early life ==
While a pupil at Stanwell School, Lloyd played youth rugby for Penarth RFC, originally as a back row. He captained the Penarth U14 team, where he played alongside future Cardiff teammate Mason Grady. A member of the Cardiff Rugby academy, Lloyd played for Cardiff U16 and U18, as well as Pontypridd RFC and Cardiff RFC. During his time in the academy, Lloyd converted to hooker.

== Club career ==
Ahead of the 2023–24 United Rugby Championship season, Lloyd signed a first team contract. He made his first appearance in a preseason fixture against the Scarlets. He made his league debut against the Bulls on 10 November 2023.

Lloyd signed an extension with Cardiff on 26 January 2024, shortly after his first international call-up. He signed a further extension on 31 March 2026.

== International career ==
Lloyd was selected for Wales U20 for the 2021 Six Nations Under 20s Championship, making two appearances.

On 16 January 2024 Lloyd was named in the Wales squad for the 2024 Six Nations Championship. Lloyd made his debut on 10 March 2024 against France, a late change to the bench after starting hooker Ryan Elias was injured.
