= James Lowe (rugby union) =

Ireland & NZ Māori international rugby union player (born 1992)

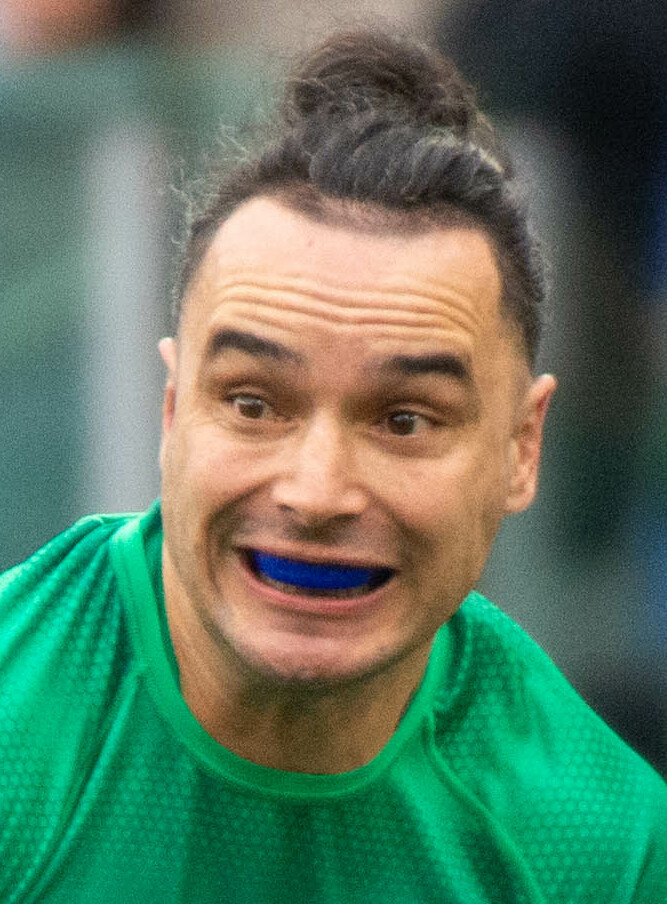
- Lowe representing Ireland during the 2023 Six Nations Championship
- Full name: James Francis Rawiri Lowe
- Born: 8 July 1992 (age 34) Nelson, New Zealand
- Height: 1.88 m (6 ft 2 in)
- Weight: 101 kg (223 lb; 15 st 13 lb)
- School: Nelson College

Rugby union career
- Position(s): Wing, Fullback
- Current team: Suntory Sungoliath
Senior career
Years	Team	Apps	(Points)
2012–2017	Tasman	46	(100)
2014–2017	Chiefs	53	(125)
2017–2026	Leinster	100	(340)
2026–	Suntory Sungoliath	0	(0)
- Correct as of 23 January 2026
International career
Years	Team	Apps	(Points)
2014–2017	Māori All Blacks	6	(30)
2020–2026	Ireland	45	(85)
2025	British & Irish Lions	2	(0)
- Correct as of 21 February 2026

James Francis Rawiri Lowe (born 8 July 1992) is a professional rugby union player who plays as a wing for the Tokyo Sungoliath in the Japan Rugby League One. Born in New Zealand, he switched to Ireland after qualifying on residency grounds.

== Early and personal life ==
Born and raised, to Geoff and Yvonne Lowe, in the city of Nelson on New Zealand's South Island, Lowe is of Māori and Irish descent and affiliates to the Ngāpuhi and Ngāi Te Rangi iwi. Lowe attended high school at Nelson College where in addition to playing rugby, he was a junior and senior schools athletics champion and also represented New Zealand Under-15s at basketball. After leaving high school, he began playing local club rugby with the Waimea Old Boys club.

Lowe gained Irish citizenship, along with his wife, in 2025.

== Career ==
=== New Zealand ===
Lowe debuted for his local province, the Tasman Mako, as a 20 year old in 2012, scoring 2 tries in 6 matches as the men from Nelson reached the Championship semi finals. He was firmly established as a regular in the side for Tasman during their Championship winning year in 2013. He contributed 6 tries in 11 appearances as the Mako narrowly saw off Hawke's Bay, 26–25 in the final to clinch promotion for the 2014 New Zealand domestic season.

He continued his excellent performances in the ITM Cup Premiership, playing all 12 of Tasman's games during the 2014 season as they reached the Premiership final before losing 36–32 to Taranaki in the final, with Lowe netting an impressive 8 tries during the campaign. 2015 was not so kind to him as injury forced him to miss the entire national provincial championship season, but he bounced back in 2016, playing 6 times and scoring 1 try as the Mako once again reached the Premiership final, before this time succumbing to local rivals, Canterbury, 43–27.

Strong domestic performances during the 2012 and 2013 seasons saw Lowe land a Super Rugby contract with Hamilton-based franchise, the Chiefs, ahead of the 2014 Super Rugby season. He made his Super Rugby debut by coming on as a substitute in the Chiefs' first match of the season against the Crusaders in Christchurch. With the Chiefs leading 11–10, but the Crusaders on the attack, he scored an intercept try from within his own 22 to help inspire his side to an 18–10 victory. In total he played 10 times and scored 2 tries in his first season in Hamilton as the defending champions were eliminated at the quarter-final stage.

2015 saw him return stronger from Tasman's excellent domestic campaign and he went on to start 12 games for the Chiefs, score 5 tries and also net himself 3 yellow cards. The Chiefs were once again eliminated in the quarter-finals in 2015, but went one step further in 2016, reaching the semi-finals before going down to New Zealand rivals and eventual winners, the Hurricanes. Lowe started 15 times and scored a career high 7 tries to firmly establish himself as a fans-favourite.

=== Leinster ===
On 6 March 2017, Lowe signed for Irish province Leinster in the Pro14 ahead of the 2017–18 season. Despite arriving late in the season due to commitments with Tasman, he quickly established himself as a fans' favourite scoring 10 tries and beating 41 defenders. He scored a try in the quarter finals of the Champions cup, seeing off the reigning champions Saracens. Lowe achieved winners' medals in both the European Champions Cup and Pro14 in his first season.

In June 2020, he signed a new three-year contract with Leinster covering the 2021–22 through 2022–23 seasons. Lowe was selected in Leinster's defeat to La Rochelle in the 2023 European Rugby Champions Cup final.

In May 2026, Lowe, who was on a provincial contract with Leinster, was reported to be leaving Irish rugby at the end of the 2025–26 season after contract negotiations broke down. It was later revealed that an agreement to keep him at Leinster until the end of the 2026–27 season had been pulled at the last minute before being replaced with an offer worth just half as much.

=== Tokyo Sungoliath ===
In June 2026, Lowe was reported to have joined the Tokyo Sungoliath on a two-year deal in Japan's Rugby League One ahead of their 2026–27 season. The following month, Lowe's transfer to Japan was confirmed, ruling him ineligible to represent Ireland at the 2027 Rugby World Cup, as the IRFU has a policy to only select players based in Ireland.

== International career ==
=== Māori All Blacks ===
Lowe represented New Zealand Schools in 2010 and was part of the successful side which defeated Australia.

Of Māori descent, Lowe affiliates to the Ngāpuhi and Ngāi Te Rangi iwi. He gained selection for the Māori All Blacks in 2014 and 2016 with his debut coming in a 61–21 win against Japan in Kobe on 1 November 2014, he scored his side's eighth and final try in the 76th minute of the match and also played in the 20–18 victory over the same opposition in Tokyo the following week. Injury prevented him from appearing for the Māori in 2015, but he made the squad again for the 2016 tour, scoring 5 tries in 3 appearances against the United States, Munster and Harlequins. He played his final game for the Māori All Blacks on 17 June 2017 against the British & Irish Lions at Rotorua International Stadium.

=== Ireland ===
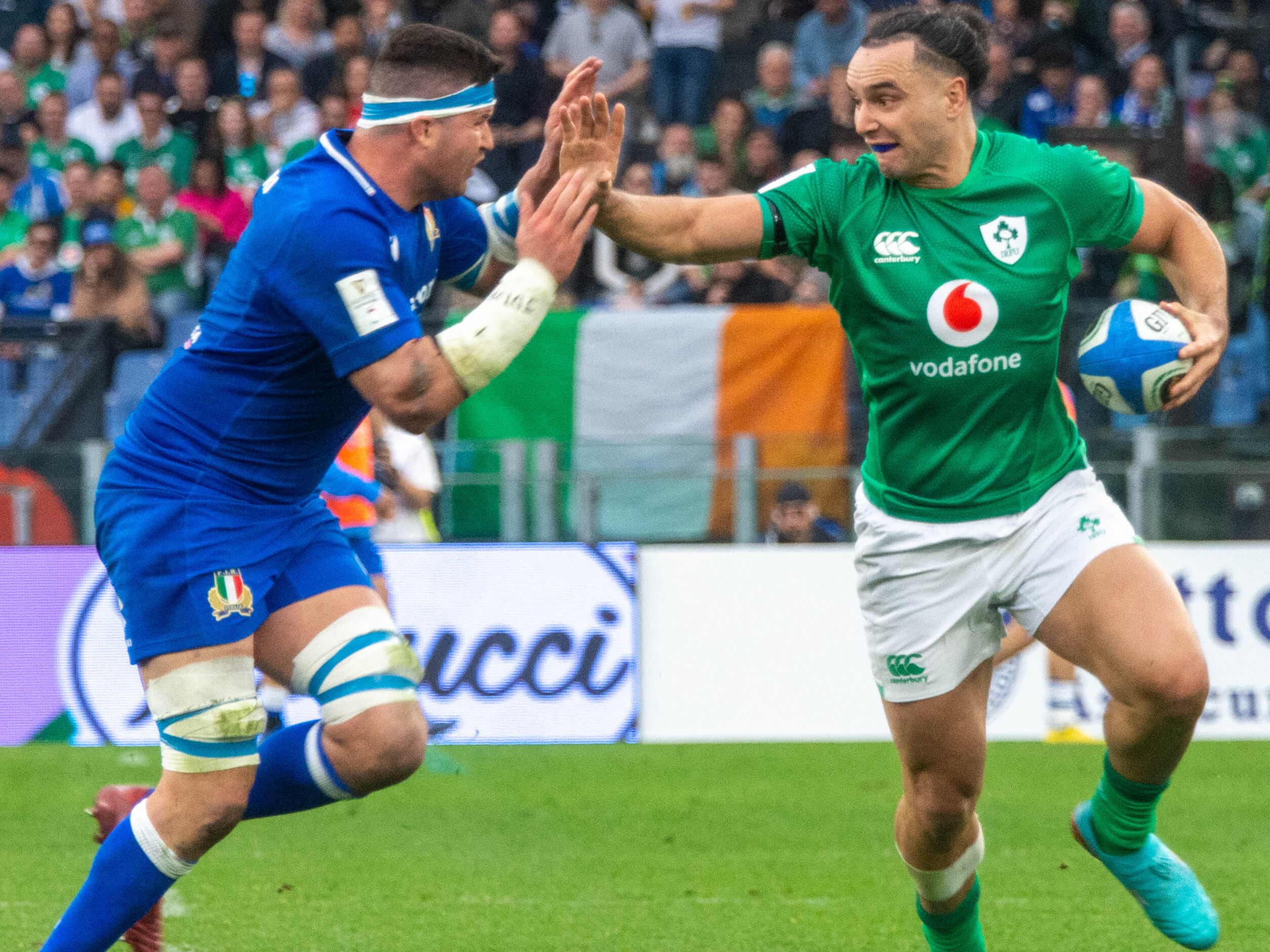
Lowe fends off an Italian defender during Ireland's 2023 Six Nations contest against Italy.

Lowe became eligible to play for Ireland in November 2020 due to the then 3-year residency rule. He made his Ireland debut on 13 November 2020 in a 32–9 victory over Wales in the Autumn Nations Cup, scoring a try in the final minute. He was selected for the 2021 Six Nations and started against Wales. In March 2023, Lowe was part of the Ireland Squad to win the Grand Slam, only the fourth time in history that Ireland had won. He was also included in the Ireland squad for the 2023 World Cup in France.

In November 2024, he was named in the 2024 World Rugby Dream Team of the Year. He was included in the 2026 Six Nations squad where Ireland finished as runners up to France for the second consecutive year. Later in 2026, he was left out of the Irish squad for the inaugural Nations Championship likely due to the unwritten rule in Irish rugby regarding players based overseas not being selected for the national team.

== Career statistics ==
=== List of international tries ===
Number	Position	Points	Tries	Result	Opposition	Venue	Date	Ref.
1	Wing	5	1	Won	Wales	Aviva Stadium	13 November 2020	
2	Wing	5	1	Won	Japan	Aviva Stadium	6 November 2021	
3	Wing	5	1	Won	New Zealand	Aviva Stadium	13 November 2021	
4–5	Wing	10	2	Won	Italy	Aviva Stadium	27 February 2022	
6	Wing	5	1	Won	England	Twickenham	12 March 2022	
7	Wing	5	1	Won	Wales	Millennium Stadium	4 February 2023	
8	Wing	5	1	Won	France	Aviva Stadium	11 February 2023	
9	Wing	5	1	Won	Scotland	Murrayfield Stadium	12 March 2023	
10	Wing	5	1	Won	England	Aviva Stadium	19 August 2023	
11	Wing	5	1	Won	Tonga	Stade de la Beaujoire	16 September 2023	
12	Wing	5	1	Won	Scotland	Stade de France	7 October 2023	
13	Wing	5	1	Won	Italy	Aviva Stadium	11 February 2024	
14	Wing	5	1	Won	Wales	Aviva Stadium	24 February 2024	
15–16	Wing	10	2	Lost	England	Twickenham Stadium	9 March 2024	
17	Wing	5	1	Won	Scotland	Murrayfield	9 February 2025	

=== International analysis by opposition ===
Opposition	Played	Win	Loss	Draw	Tries	Points	Win %
Argentina	2	2	0	0	0	0	100%
Australia*	3	3	0	0	0	0	100%
England	6	4	2	0	3	15	66.67%
France	3	2	1	0	1	5	66.67%
Italy	5	5	0	0	3	15	100%
Japan	1	1	0	0	1	5	100%
New Zealand	6	3	3	0	1	5	50%
Romania	1	1	0	0	0	0	100%
Scotland	6	6	0	0	4	20	100%
South Africa	3	2	1	0	0	0	66.67%
Tonga	1	1	0	0	1	5	100%
Wales	5	4	1	0	3	15	80%
Career	42	34	8	0	17	85	80.95%

*Includes matches played with the British & Irish Lions
as of 26 July 2025

=== Club summary ===
Year	Team	Played	Start	Sub	Tries	Cons	Pens	Drop	Points	Yel	Red
2014	Chiefs	10	6	4	2	0	0	0	10	1	0
2015	Chiefs	12	12	0	5	0	0	0	25	3	0
2016	Chiefs	15	15	0	7	0	0	0	35	0	0
2017	Chiefs	16	16	0	11	0	0	0	55	0	0
2017–18	Leinster	13	13	0	10	0	0	0	50	0	0
2018–19	Leinster	17	17	0	11	0	0	0	55	1	1
2019–20	Leinster	17	17	0	9	0	0	0	45	0	0
2020–21	Leinster	5	5	0	4	0	0	0	20	1	0
2021–22	Leinster	13	11	2	13	0	0	0	65	0	0
2022–23	Leinster	7	7	0	3	0	0	0	15	0	0
2023–24	Leinster	9	9	0	10	0	0	0	50	2	0
2024–25	Leinster	11	11	0	7	0	0	0	35	0	0
2025–26	Leinster	5	5	0	1	0	0	0	5	0	0
Career		150	144	6	93	0	0	0	440	8	1

as of 4 January 2025

== Honours ==
=== Team ===
Tasman

- Mitre 10 Cup Championship
  - 1: 2013

Leinster

- United Rugby Championship
  - 6: 2018, 2019, 2020, 2021, 2025, 2026
- European Rugby Champions Cup
  - 1: 2018

Ireland

- Six Nations Championship
  - 2: 2023, 2024
- Grand Slam
  - 1: 2023
- Triple Crown
  - 3: 2022, 2023, 2025
- Centenary Quaich
  - 5: 2021, 2022, 2023, 2024, 2025
- Millennium Trophy
  - 3: 2022, 2023, 2025

=== Individual ===
- 1× Pro14 Dream Team: 2018
- 1× European Rugby Champions Cup try scoring leader: 2022
- 2x Six Nations Team of the Championship: 2023, 2024
- 1x World Rugby Men's 15s Dream Team of the Year: 2024
- Leinster all time try scorer
