= Romain Taofifénua =

French rugby union player (born 1990)

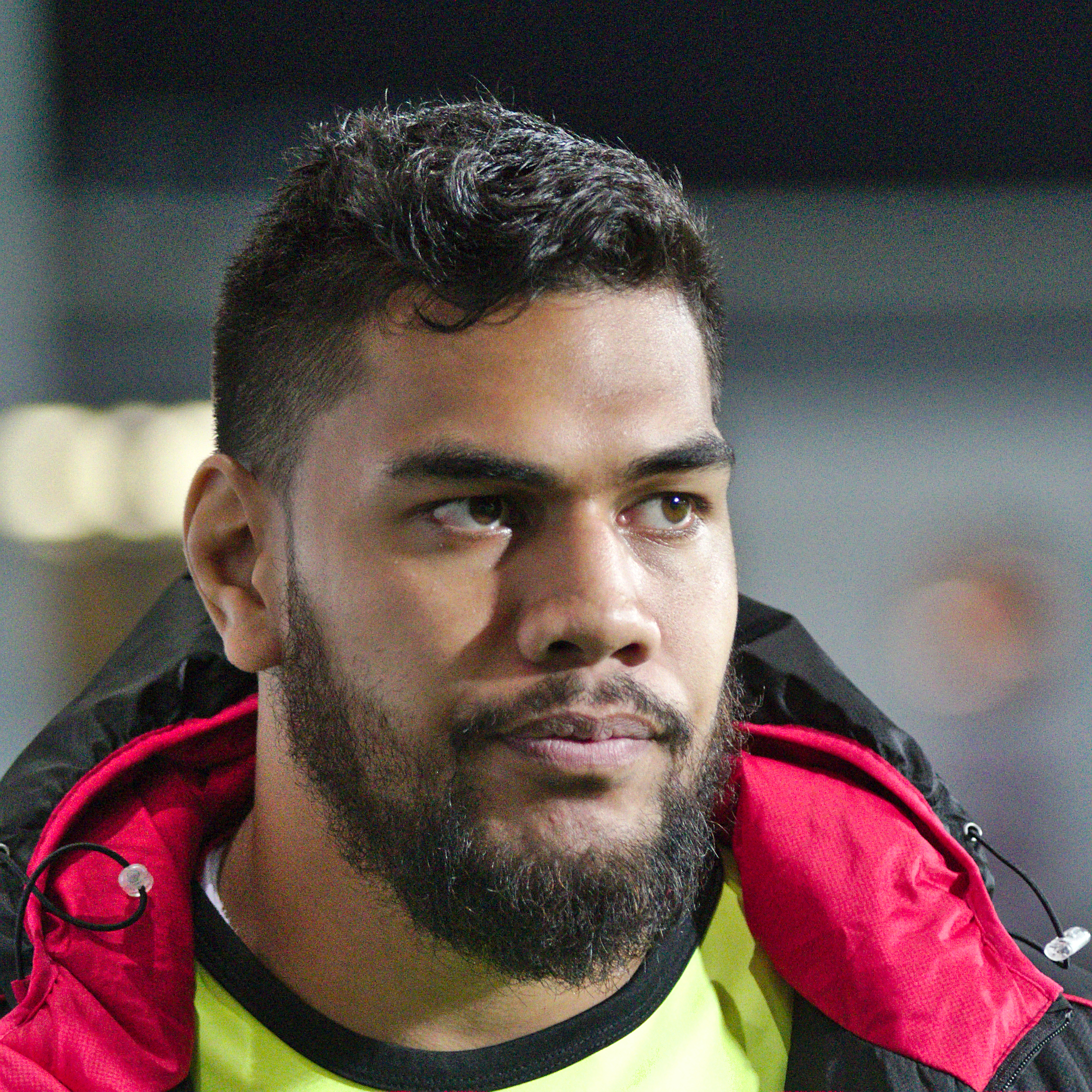
- Taofifénua representing Toulon during the Top 14
- Born: 14 September 1990 (age 36) Mont-de-Marsan, France
- Height: 2.03 m (6 ft 8 in)
- Weight: 135 kg (298 lb; 21 st 4 lb)
- Notable relative: Willy Taofifénua (father)

Rugby union career
- Position: Lock
- Current team: Racing 92
Senior career
Years	Team	Apps	(Points)
2010–2014	Perpignan	82	(40)
2014–2021	Toulon	152	(60)
2021–2024	Lyon	58	(30)
2024–	Racing 92	6	(5)
- Correct as of 16 November 2024
International career
Years	Team	Apps	(Points)
2009–2010	France U20	4	(5)
2012–	France	59	(15)
- Correct as of 22 November 2025

Romain Taofifénua (born 14 September 1990) is a French professional rugby union player who plays as a lock for Top 14 club Racing 92 and the France national team.

== Club career ==
Taofifénua's rugby career began in 2005, while playing for Limoges. He later moved to play for Clermont in the 2007–08 Top 14 season. However, Taofifénua failed to make any appearances for the senior side, and signed with USA Perpignan for the 2008–09 Top 14 season. Despite signing in 2008, he didn't receive his first appearance for the club until 20 August 2010, during the 2010–11 Top 14 season. In that season, he made 3 appearances for Perpignan. In the 2011–12 Top 14 season, he became a more consistent player in the team, making 23 starts in 28 appearances. Most notable, a 34–20 win against defending champions Toulouse. After the 2013–14 Top 14 season, where Perpignan were relegated, Taofifénua signed with Toulon, who were both European and Domestic champions. His first Toulon appearance came on 15 August 2014 against Bayonne, in a 29–15 victory.

== International career ==
Romain has played in all age grade levels for France, having represented the U18s, U19s and U20s. It was when playing for the U20s in the 2009 Six Nations Under 20s Championship when he first caught the eye of Perpignan selectors. Haven performed well for Perpignan in 2010, he was selected for the 2010 IRB Junior World Championship, playing in 3 matches - against Ireland and Argentina twice. He was one of five try scorers in the 5th place play-off, whom was won by France 37–23.

Taofifénua was selected for the French senior side for their 2012 tour to Argentina, and made his first appearance in an uncapped game for XV du Président against Serge Betsen's XV on 6 June 2012. He made his first official test appearance a week later, coming off the bench for Yoann Maestri in the 74th minute.

== Career statistics ==
=== List of international tries ===
International tries
No.	Date	Venue	Opponent	Score	Result	Competition
1	14 February 2015	Aviva Stadium, Dublin, Ireland	Ireland	18–11	18–11	2015 Six Nations
2	14 February 2021	Stade de France, Saint-Denis, France	Wales	5–0	32–30	2021 Six Nations
3	10 March 2024	Millennium Stadium, Cardiff, Wales	Wales	24–35	24–45	2024 Six Nations

== Personal life ==
Taofifénua is the son of Willy Taofifénua who used to play for FC Grenoble, and the older brother of Sébastien Taofifénua, who also started his career with Union Sportive Arlequins Perpignan. He is of Wallisian heritage.

== Honours ==
France

- 2x Six Nations Championship: 2022, 2025
- 1× Grand Slam: 2022

Toulon

- 1× European Rugby Champions Cup: 2015
