= Ollie Lawrence =

England international rugby union player

- Full name: Oliver Francis Lawrence
- Born: 18 September 1999 (age 27) Birmingham, England
- Height: 1.76 m (5 ft 9 in)
- Weight: 104 kg (229 lb; 16 st 5 lb)
- School: Old Swinford Hospital; Bromsgrove School

Rugby union career
- Position: Centre
- Current team: Bath
Senior career
Years	Team	Apps	(Points)
2017–2022	Worcester Warriors	57	(80)
2022–	Bath	56	(100)
- Correct as of 1 May 2026
International career
Years	Team	Apps	(Points)
2017–2018	England U18	2	(10)
2018–2019	England U20	4	(0)
2020–	England	37	(35)
- Correct as of 19 February 2026

Oliver Francis Lawrence (born 18 September 1999) is an English professional rugby union player who plays as a centre for Premiership Rugby club Bath and the England national team

== Early life ==
Lawrence was born in Birmingham. His father, Michael, played rugby on the wing for Moseley. He attended rugby-playing schools, West House for Junior followed by Old Swinford Hospital for secondary, and then to sixth form at Bromsgrove School on a scholarship.

Lawrence had trials with Aston Villa and Birmingham City and also played age-group cricket for Warwickshire. Ultimately he chose rugby and by the age of fifteen had joined the academy of Worcester Warriors.

== Club career ==
Lawrence burst onto the senior Warriors scene in November 2017 with a try on his first-team debut against Sale Sharks in the Anglo-Welsh Cup at Sixways Stadium. He went on to make three first-team appearances during the 2017–18 season while he impressed for Warriors Under 18s and Worcester Cavaliers, the latter where he scored two tries in six appearances, which also included four try assists in a single game against Sale Jets.

Lawrence continued his impressive progress in the 2018-19 campaign when he made fourteen senior appearances, and scored two important tries which helped Warriors to successive EPCR Challenge Cup victories over Ospreys and Stade Français.

On 5 December 2018, Lawrence signed his first professional contract to stay with Worcester, and was subsequently promoted to the senior squad from the 2019–20 season. He scored a first-half try hat-trick in just ten minutes against Enisei-STM in the European Challenge Cup in January 2020, and a try against Wasps on his first Premiership start later that month.

In May 2022 Lawrence was a member of the Warriors side that beat London Irish in the final of the Premiership Rugby Cup at the Brentford Community Stadium to win Worcester their first ever top-flight trophy.

On 5 October 2022, Lawrence had his contract terminated at Worcester due to the liquidation of the company to which players had been contracted. After initially joining Bath on a short-term loan due to uncertainty around the future of the Warriors, Lawrence signed a long-term deal with the club in October 2022. On 10 May 2023, after a very successful first season at Bath, Lawrence was named the Premiership Player of the season.

== International career ==
Lawrence first represented England at U16 level against Wales where he scored two tries and was awarded man of the match. In 2018 Lawrence scored a try for England under-18 against Wales, and also played one game in the 2018 Six Nations Under 20s Championship against Scotland. Later that year he received his first call-up to train with the senior England squad by coach Eddie Jones prior to their summer tour of South Africa. He again represented England in the 2019 Six Nations Under 20s Championship, before an ankle injury during the tournament ended his season two months early, preventing him from competing at the 2019 World Rugby Under 20 Championship.

Lawrence was again called up to the England senior squad for the completion of the 2020 Six Nations Championship and the subsequent Autumn Nations Cup. On 31 October 2020 he made his senior England debut from the bench in their delayed final Six Nations match against Italy which they won to win the tournament. The following month saw Lawrence make his first start in the opening round of the Autumn Nations Cup against Georgia.

In June 2021 Lawrence was included in the squad for Tests against the United States and Canada. On 4 July 2021 he scored his first try at international level against the US in a 43–29 win, but was forced to leave the field early with a head injury and did not appear in their next game against Canada.

New coach Steve Borthwick selected Lawrence for the 2023 Six Nations Championship and he scored the winning try in a victory against Wales at the Millennium Stadium. Later that year he was included in the squad for the 2023 Rugby World Cup and came off the bench as a substitute during both the quarter-final victory over Fiji and semi-final elimination against champions South Africa. He also featured in their last fixture of the tournament as England defeated Argentina to finish third and claim a bronze medal.

== Career statistics ==
=== List of international tries ===
as of 8 February 2025

No.	Date	Venue	Opponent	Score	Result	Competition	Ref.
1	4 July 2021	Twickenham Stadium, London, England	United States	10–3	43–29	2021 July rugby union tests	
2	25 February 2023	Millennium Stadium, Cardiff, Wales	Wales	20–10	20–10	2023 Six Nations Championship	
3	9 March 2024	Twickenham Stadium, London, England	Ireland	5–3	23–22	2024 Six Nations Championship	
4	16 March 2024	Parc Olympique Lyonnais, Lyon, France	France	10–16	31–33	2024 Six Nations Championship	
5	16 March 2024	Parc Olympique Lyonnais, Lyon, France	France	15–16	31–33	2024 Six Nations Championship	
6	8 February 2025	Twickenham Stadium, London, England	France	5-7	26-25	2025 Six Nations Championship	
7	15 November 2025	Twickenham Stadium, London, England	New Zealand	5-12	33-19	2025 Autumn Internationals	

== Honours ==
Club

Worcester Warriors

1x Premiership Rugby Cup: 2021–22

International

England

1x Six Nations Championship: 2020

Individual

1x Premiership Rugby player of the season: 2022–23
