= Aaron Wainwright =

Welsh rugby union player (born 1997)

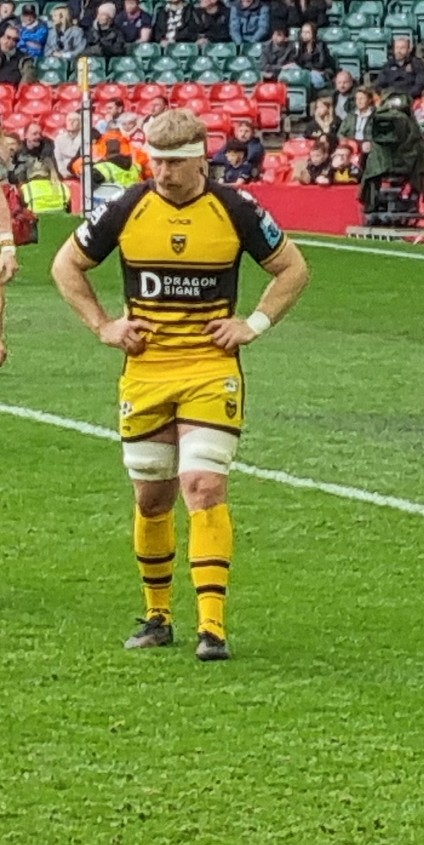
- Judgement Day 2025
- Full name: Aaron James Wainwright
- Born: 25 September 1997 (age 29) Newport, Wales
- Height: 1.89 m (6 ft 2 in)
- Weight: 106 kg (234 lb; 16 st 10 lb)
- School: Bassaleg School
- University: Cardiff Metropolitan University

Rugby union career
- Position(s): Number 8, Flanker
- Current team: Dragons
Senior career
Years	Team	Apps	(Points)
2017–2026	Dragons	117	(80)
2026–	Leicester Tigers	5	(5)
- Correct as of 1 November 2026
International career
Years	Team	Apps	(Points)
2018–	Wales	67	(45)
- Correct as of 18 November 2026

Aaron James Wainwright (born 25 September 1997) is a Welsh professional rugby union player who plays as a number eight for Leicester Tigers in England's Premiership Rugby and the Wales national team. Between 2017 and 2026 he played 117 times for the Newport-based Dragons RFC.

== Early life ==
Wainwright originally looked destined for a career in football having been on the books of both Cardiff City and Newport County during his teenage years. He was at Cardiff City from Under 9-16 and was included in the Wales Under 16 football squad. Wainwright played youth rugby for Whitehead RFC, and is widely regarded as the clubs 3rd best number 8 of all time, behind Mike Griffiths and Lewis David. He was out scored by Benjamin Stanley. Wainwright attended Cardiff Metropolitan University and played in the BUCS Super Rugby tournament.

== Club career ==
Wainwright made his debut for the Dragons regional team in 2017 having previously played for Newport RFC. The back row completed a clean sweep at the region's end of season awards in May 2019 as he was named the Coaches Player-of-the-Year, Players' Player-of-the-Year and DOSC Player-of-the-Year.

From his new position of Number 8, Wainwright scored against the Ospreys, as the Dragons won the derby 31–20 on 6 March 2021. His success against regional rivals continued as he touched down twice helping the Dragons beat the Scarlets 52–32 on 25 April 2021.

In January 2026, he signed for Prem Rugby side Leicester Tigers ahead of the 2026–27 Premiership Rugby season.

== International career ==
Wainwright made his debut for the Welsh national team on 10 June 2018 versus Argentina as a second-half replacement. He was named on the bench a week prior for the match against South Africa, but did not take to the field.

He scored his debut international try, on 20 October 2019, as Wales' opening try in the 2019 Rugby World Cup quarter-final against France at the Oita stadium. A foul against him by Sébastien Vahaamahina led to Vahaamahina being sent off. Wales went on to win the match by one point and Wainwright was named Mastercard Player of the Match.

Under new Welsh coach Wayne Pivac, Wainwright underwent a shift from blindside flanker to Number 8. He was named man of the match in the win against Georgia in the 2020 Autumn Nations Series. He featured twice in the 2021 Six Nations Championship, as Wales won the title and the Triple Crown. Wainwright continued to feature for Wales throughout the 2021 end-of-year rugby union internationals and 2022 Six Nations, primarily at Number 8 but also appearing on the blindside.

Injury ruled Wainwright out of the 2022 Wales rugby union tour of South Africa, and he was omitted from the squad for the 2022 end-of-year rugby union internationals, but was selected for the Barbarians in their match against the All Blacks XV.

Wainwright was selected for the 2023 Six Nations Championship, starting against France. He was also named in the 2023 Rugby World Cup squad. He started against Fiji, Australia, and Georgia as a flanker, and against Argentina at number eight.

Wainwright was named in the squad for the 2024 Six Nations Championship. He started all matches, and scored a try against Scotland. Wainwright was selected for the 2024 end-of-year rugby union internationals, and was one of only three players with 50 caps. He started against Fiji and Australia, scoring a try against Australia.

In January 2025, Wainwright was selected for the 2025 Six Nations Championship. He played in all the matches, coming off the bench against Italy and scoring a try in the second half.

Wainwright was named in the squad for the 2025 end-of-year rugby union internationals. He started against Argentina, Japan, and South Africa. He received a yellow card in the loss to South Africa due to a dangerous tackle on Sacha Feinberg-Mngomezulu.

Wainwright was named in the squad for the 2026 Six Nations by Steve Tandy. He started in all matches. Wainwright scored two tries against Italy, and was named player of the match.

== Personal life ==
Wainwright is a life-long Arsenal fan. In July 2026, Wainwright confirmed that he and fiance, Brodie Parfitt, are expecting their first child.

== Career statistics ==
=== List of international tries ===
No.	Date	Venue	Opponent	Score	Result	Competition
1	20 October 2019	Ōita Bank Dome, Ōita, Japan	France	5–12	20–19	2019 Rugby World Cup
2	4 November 2023	Millennium Stadium, Cardiff, Wales	Barbarian F.C.	14–7	49–26	Exhibition game
3	3 February 2024	Millennium Stadium, Cardiff, Wales	Scotland	19–27	26–27	2024 Six Nations Championship
4	17 November 2024	Millennium Stadium, Cardiff, Wales	Australia	5–19	20–52	2024 end-of-year rugby union internationals
5	8 February 2025	Stadio Olimpico, Rome, Italy	Italy	19–8	22–15	2025 Six Nations Championship
6	14 March 2026	Millennium Stadium, Cardiff, Wales	Italy	7–0	31–17	2026 Six Nations Championship
7	14 March 2026	Millennium Stadium, Cardiff, Wales	Italy	14–0	31–17	2026 Six Nations Championship
