= Mackenzie Martin =

Welsh rugby union player

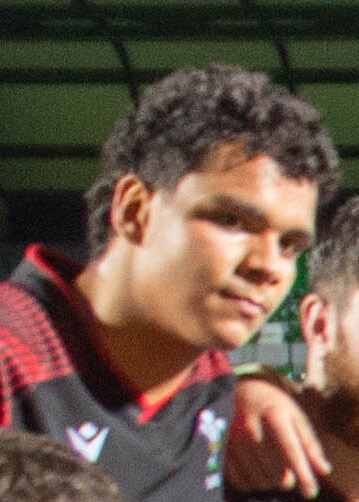
- Martin representing Wales during the Six Nations Under 20s Championship
- Born: 26 October 2003 (age 23) Cardiff, Wales
- Height: 1.96 m (6 ft 5 in)
- Weight: 116 kg (256 lb; 18 st 4 lb)
- School: Cardiff and Vale College

Rugby union career
- Position(s): Number 8, Flanker
- Current team: Dragons
Senior career
Years	Team	Apps	(Points)
2023–	Cardiff	19	(10)
2025–	→ Dragons (loan)	0	(0)
International career
Years	Team	Apps	(Points)
2022–2023	Wales U20	12	(0)
2024–	Wales	5	(0)

Mackenzie Martin (born 26 October 2003) is a Welsh professional rugby union player who plays as a number eight for United Rugby Championship club Dragons, on loan from Cardiff, and the Wales national team.

== Early life ==
From Ely, Cardiff, he was schooled Hywel Dda primary school, Mary Immaculate High School and Cardiff and Vale College. He played for the Cardiff Rugby academy from U15 level. Martin first played as a prop, before moving to the back row.

== Club career ==
He featured for Cardiff RFC as they won the 2021–22 Indigo Group Premiership. That season he split his time between playing for Cardiff RFC, Cardiff and Vale College and the Wales national under-20 rugby union team.

In July 2023, he signed a pro contract with Cardiff Rugby to move from the academy to the first-team squad. He made his United Rugby Championship debut for Cardiff Rugby against the Stormers, on 24 November 2023. He scored his first Cardiff Rugby try on 9 December 2023 against Stade Toulousain in the European Rugby Champions Cup.

Martin signed a senior contract with Cardiff on 19 January 2024.

== International career ==
He represented Wales U20 at the 2023 Six Nations Under 20s Championship. He also featured at the 2023 World Rugby U20 Championship in the summer of 2023. In January 2024, he was included for the senior Wales squad for the 2024 Six Nations Championship.
