= Georges-Henri Colombe =

France international rugby union player

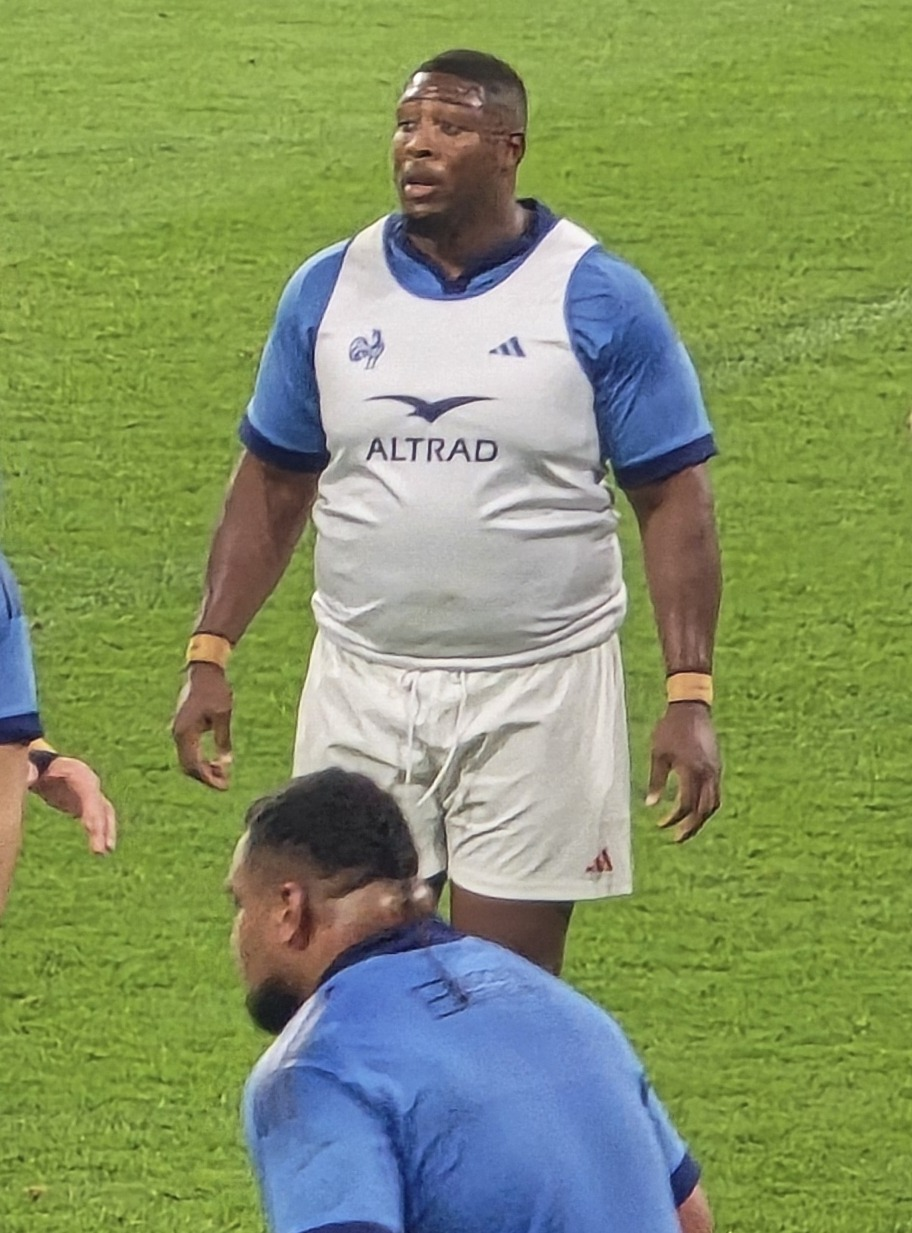
- Colombe with France in 2024
- Born: Georges-Henri Colombe Reazel; 9 April 1998 (age 28) Nanterre, France
- Height: 1.93 m (6 ft 4 in)
- Weight: 142 kg (22 st 5 lb; 313 lb)

Rugby union career
- Position: Tighthead prop
- Current team: Toulouse
Senior career
Years	Team	Apps	(Points)
2017–2022	Racing 92	58	(15)
2018	→ Nevers (loan)	2	(0)
2022–2025	La Rochelle	62	(30)
2025–	Toulouse	0	(0)
- Correct as of 31 July 2025
International career
Years	Team	Apps	(Points)
2017–2018	France U20	9	(0)
2024–	France	10	(5)
- Correct as of 22 February 2026

Georges-Henri Colombe Reazel (born 9 April 1998) is a French rugby union player. His position is tighthead prop and he currently plays for Toulouse in the Top 14.

He was called for the first time in the France national rugby team in October 2020 for the 2020 Six Nations Championship.

== Career statistics ==
=== List of international tries ===
International tries
No.	Date	Venue	Opponent	Score	Result	Competition
1	10 March 2024	Millennium Stadium, Cardiff, Wales	Wales	24–28	24–45	2024 Six Nations

== Honours ==
La Rochelle

- 1× European Rugby Champions Cup: 2023

France

- 2x Six Nations Championship: 2025, 2026
