= Esteban Abadie =

French rugby union player (born 1997)

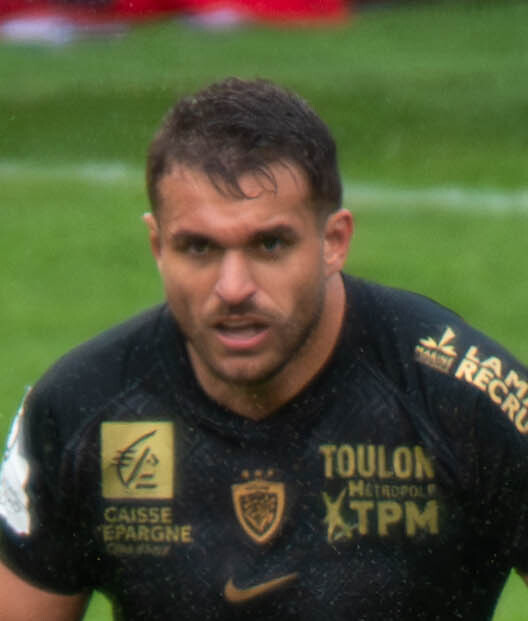
- Born: Esteban Abadie; 1 December 1997 (age 28) Le Mans, France
- Height: 1.88 m (6 ft 2 in)
- Weight: 105 kg (231 lb; 16 st 7 lb)

Rugby union career
- Position: Flanker
Youth career
- 2009–2017: Racing 92
Senior career
Years	Team	Apps	(Points)
2017–2019	Racing 92	1	(0)
2019–2023	Brive	60	(15)
2023–	Toulon	45	(15)
- Correct as of 25 February 2024
International career
Years	Team	Apps	(Points)
2024–	France	2	(0)
- Correct as of 19 July 2025

Esteban Abadie (born 1 December 1997) is a French rugby union player who plays as a flanker for Toulon and the France national team.

== Club career ==
Born in Le Mans, Sarthe, Esteban Abadie came through the youth ranks of Racing 92, where he made his first and only appearance with the first-team during the 2017–18 season against Stade Toulousain.

In 2019, he joined CA Brive, where he was a standout player, despite his team struggling with relegation.

He had established himself as one of the most regular Top 14 player, excelling both as a line-out specialist and an efficient ball-carrier, earning him a move to RC Toulon in June 2023. There he quickly emerged as one of the leaders of his team, under the supervision of Pierre Mignoni and Sergio Parisse.

== International career ==
Abadie was first called to the France senior team in January 2024 for the Six Nations Championship, despite the player then being injured.

== Style of play ==
Esteban Abadie is part of a rugby family, his dad Geoffrey Abadie, his grandfather Alain Abadie and his great-uncle André Abadie all played at professional level.

== Honours ==
France

- 1x Six Nations Championship: 2025
