= Calvin Nash =

Irish rugby union player

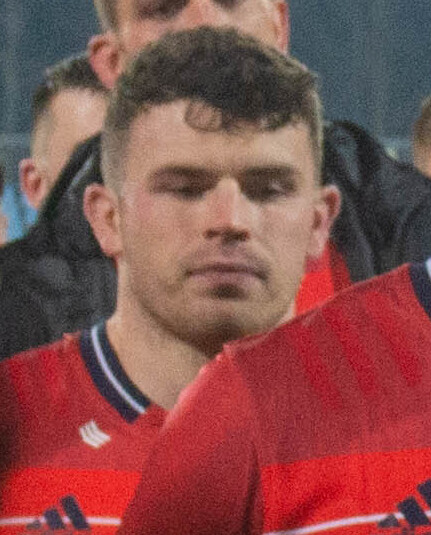
- Nash in 2022
- Born: 8 August 1997 (age 29) Limerick, Ireland
- Height: 1.78 m (5 ft 10 in)
- Weight: 90 kg (200 lb; 14 st 2 lb)
- School: Crescent College

Rugby union career
- Position(s): Wing, Centre
Amateur team(s)
Years	Team	Apps	(Points)
2016–	Young Munster		
Senior career
Years	Team	Apps	(Points)
2017–	Munster	100	(140)
- Correct as of 25 April 2026
International career
Years	Team	Apps	(Points)
2017	Ireland U20	7	(20)
2022	Emerging Ireland	2	(5)
2022	Ireland A	2	(5)
2023–	Ireland	12	(20)
- Correct as of 12 July 2025

Calvin Nash (born 8 August 1997) is an Irish rugby union player who plays as a wing for United Rugby Championship club Munster and the Ireland national team.

== Munster ==
In January 2017, Nash was added to Munster's squad for the 2016–17 European Rugby Champions Cup. On 3 February 2017, Nash made his competitive debut for Munster when he started against Edinburgh in a 2016–17 Pro12 fixture. He scored his first try for Munster on 26 November 2017, coming off the bench against Zebre in round 9 of the 2017–18 Pro14 and helping the province to a 36–19 away victory. He signed a one-year development contract with Munster in January 2018, which saw him join the senior squad for the 2018–19 season. Nash was nominated for the 2018 John McCarthy Award for Academy Player of the Year in April 2018.

Nash signed a two-year contract extension with Munster in December 2018. Nash made his European debut for Munster in their final pool 4 fixture of the 2019–20 Champions Cup against Welsh side Ospreys on 19 January 2020. He signed a two-year contract extension with the province in February 2021, and signed a further two-year extension in October 2022. He started in Munster's 19–14 win against the Stormers in the final of the 2022–23 United Rugby Championship on 27 May 2023.

== Ireland ==
Nash was selected in Ireland U20s training squad for the 2017 Six Nations Under 20 Championship. On 24 February 2017, Nash made his debut for the side, captaining the team to a 27–22 home victory against France U20 in Donnybrook Stadium. On 11 March 2017, Nash again captained Ireland U20, scoring a try in his sides 41–27 defeat at the hands of Wales U20 in Eirias Stadium. On 17 March 2017, Nash was again captain in Ireland U20's 14–10 defeat against England U20. He was also selected in the Ireland Under-20s squad for the 2017 World Rugby Under 20 Championship.

Nash was selected in the Emerging Ireland squad that travelled to South Africa to participate in the Toyota Challenge against Currie Cup teams Free State Cheetahs, Griquas and Pumas in September–October 2022. He started and scored one try in Emerging Ireland's 54–7 opening win against Griquas on 30 September, and started again in the 21–14 win against the Cheetahs on 9 October.

Nash earned his first senior international call-up when he was selected by head coach Andy Farrell in the Ireland squad for the 2022 Autumn Nations Series. He started for Ireland A in their 47–19 defeat against an All Blacks XV on 4 November 2022. He earned his first senior international cap for Ireland as a replacement in their 33–17 win against Italy in a 2023 Rugby World Cup warm-up match on 5 August 2023. Nash was released from the squad before Ireland's second warm-up match.

Nash made his first start for Ireland in the opening game of the 2024 Six Nations Championship against France at the Stade Vélodrome on 2 February, scoring a try.

In February 2025, having not originally been named in the starting lineup to face Scotland, during the 2025 Six Nations, he replaced Mack Hansen, who had withdrawn with a hamstring injury, before scoring the opening try in a 32–18 away victory.

== Statistics ==
=== International analysis by opposition ===
Against	Played	Won	Lost	Drawn	Tries	Points	% Won
England	1	0	1	0	0	0	0
France	2	1	1	0	1	5	50
Georgia	1	1	0	0	0	0	100
Italy	2	2	0	0	1	5	100
Portugal	1	1	0	0	1	5	100
Scotland	2	2	0	0	1	5	100
Wales	1	1	0	0	0	0	100
Total	10	8	2	0	4	20	80

Correct as of 12 July 2025

== Honours ==
=== Ireland ===
- Six Nations Championship
  - Winner (1): 2024

=== Munster ===
- United Rugby Championship
  - Winner (1): 2022–23
