= Martin Page-Relo =

Italy international rugby union player

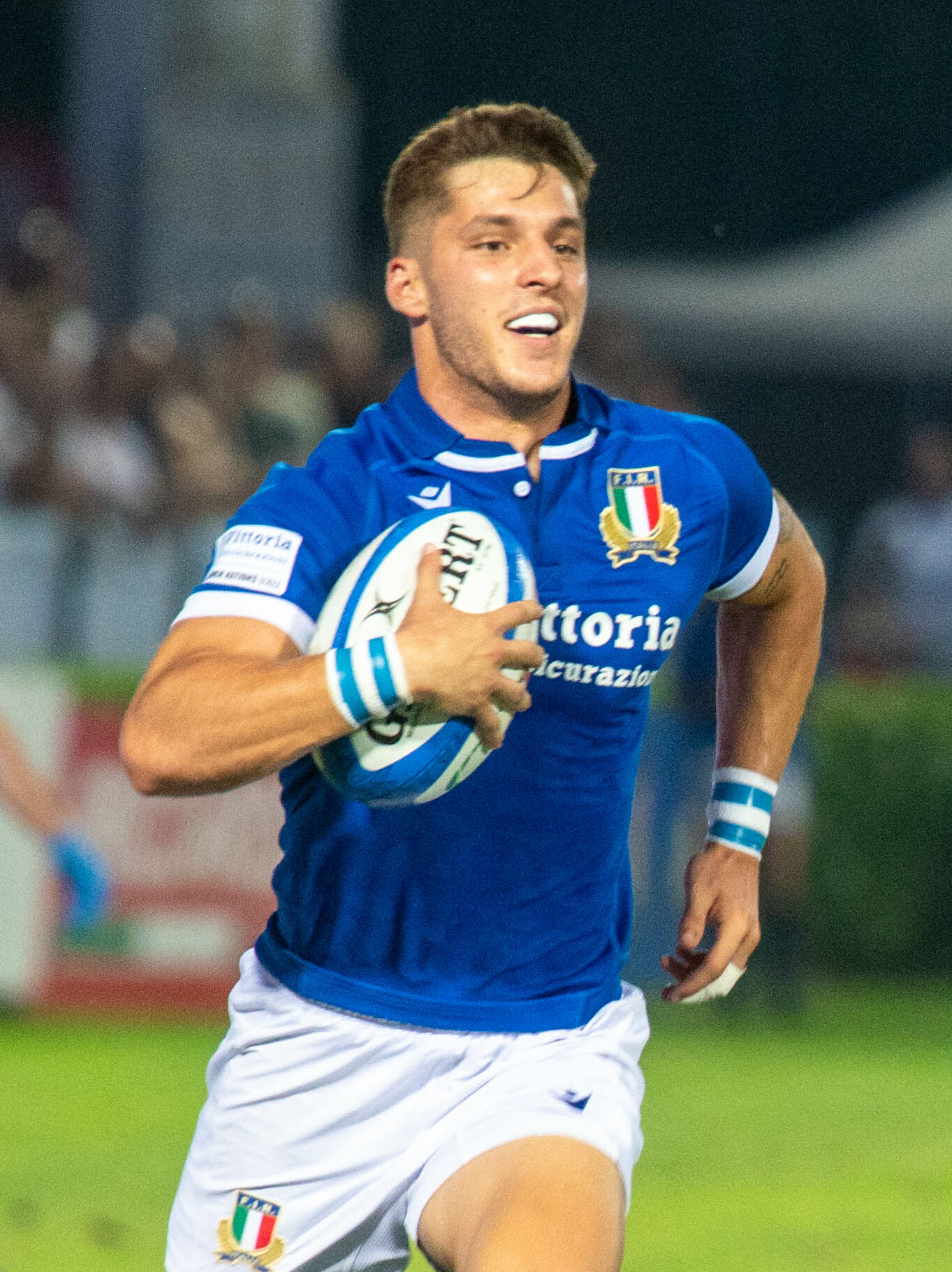
- Page-Relo playing for Italy in 2023
- Born: Martin Page-Relo; 6 January 1999 (age 27) L'Isle-Jourdain, France
- Height: 1.73 m (5 ft 8 in)
- Weight: 77 kg (170 lb; 12 st 2 lb)

Rugby union career
- Position: Scrum-half
- Current team: Bordeaux
Youth career
- 2004–2012: US L'Isle-Jourdain
- 2012–2020: Toulouse
Senior career
| Years | Team | Apps | (Points) |
| 2020–2023 | Toulouse | 27 | (5) |
| 2020–2021 | → Carcassonne (loan) | 21 | (8) |
| 2023−2025 | Lyon | 31 | (29) |
| 2025− | Bordeaux | 16 | (48) |
- Correct as of 17 Sep 2026
International career
| Years | Team | Apps | (Points) |
| 2023– | Italy | 21 | (28) |
- Correct as of 25 Nov 2025

Martin Page-Relo (born 6 January 1999) is a French-born Italian rugby union player, who plays scrum-half for Bordeaux in Top 14 and Italy.

== Club career ==
Martin Page-Relo started playing rugby as a 5 year old in his hometown L'Isle-Jourdain, Gers, before moving to Stade Toulousain in 2012.

Page-Relo made his professional debut on loan from Stade Toulousain, with US Carcassonne on 13 September 2020.

In 2023, he aigned with Lyon for two season, before moving to Bordeaux at the start of the 2025-2026 season.

== International career ==
Martin Page-Relo was first called to the Italy senior team in March 2023 for the 2023 Six Nations Championship, being eligible for the selection per his maternal grandparents' Italian citizenship. On 5 July 2023, he was selected by Kieran Crowley to be part of an Italy squad for the 2023 Rugby World Cup warm-up matches. He made his debut against Scotland in the first match of 29 July 2023.

On 22 August 2023, he was named in the Italy's 33-man squad for the 2023 Rugby World Cup.
