= Andrea Zambonin =

Italy international rugby union player

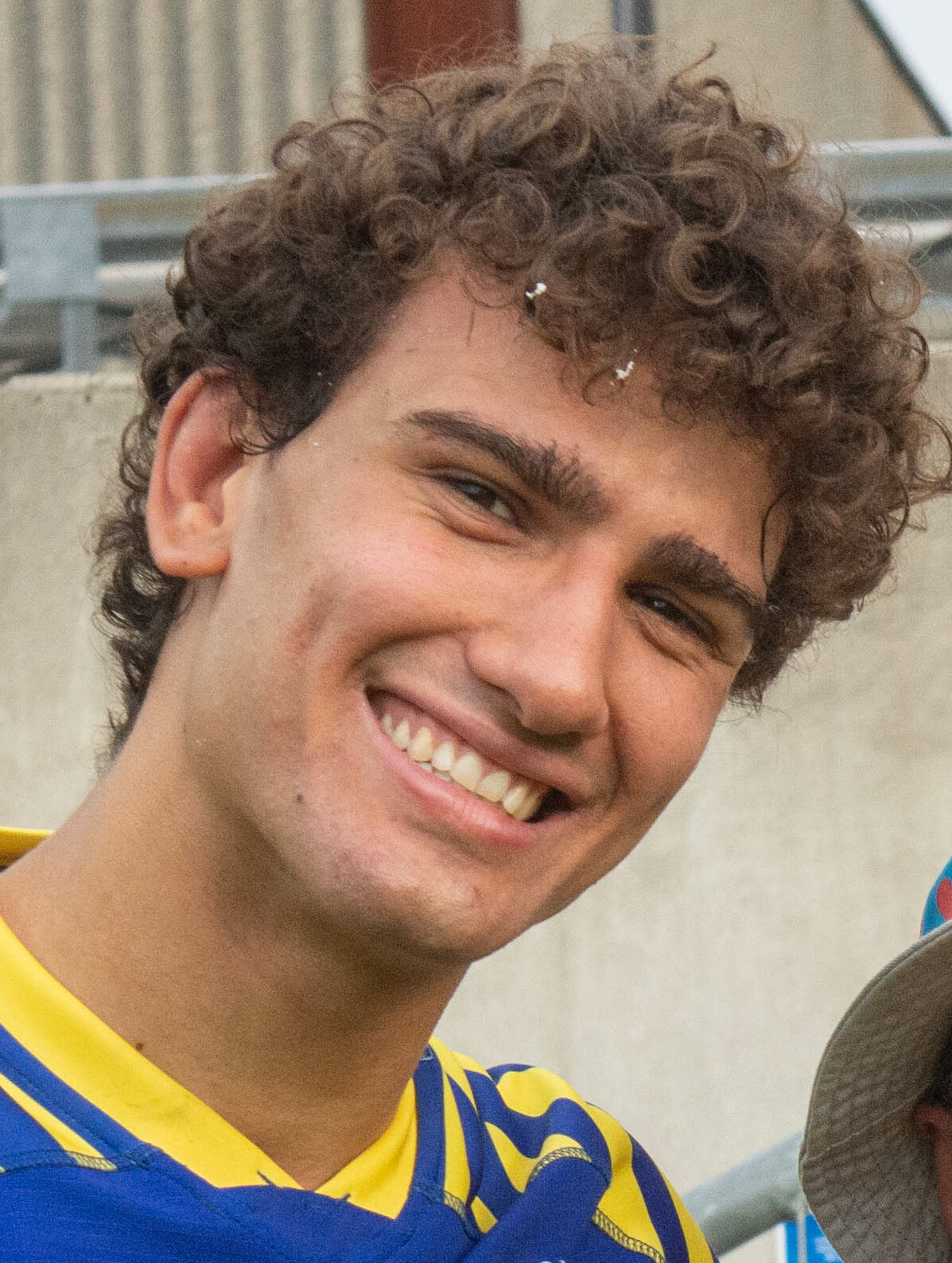
- Zambonin in 2022
- Born: 3 September 2000 (age 26) Vicenza, Italy
- Height: 2.02 m (6 ft 8 in)
- Weight: 114 kg (17 st 13 lb; 251 lb)

Rugby union career
- Position: Second Row
- Current team: Exeter Chiefs
Youth career
- Rangers Rugby Vicenza
Senior career
Years	Team	Apps	(Points)
2018−2020	F.I.R. Academy		
2019	→Calvisano	1	(0)
2020−2021	Calvisano	20	(0)
2021−2025	Zebre	61	(15)
2025−	Exeter Chiefs	27	(15)
- Correct as of 17 Sep 2026
International career
Years	Team	Apps	(Points)
2019−2020	Italy Under 20	6	(0)
2021	Italy A	2	(0)
2022−	Italy	21	(5)
- Correct as of 17 Sep 2026

Andrea Zambonin (Vicenza, 3 September 2000) is an Italian rugby union player. His usual position is lock and currently plays for Exeter Chiefs in Premiership Rugby.

Zambonin also represented Calvisano in the 2019–20 European Rugby Challenge Cup as Additional Player. He played for Zebre in United Rugby Championship from 2021 to 2025.

In 2019 and 2020, Zambonin was named in the Italy Under 20 squad. On 14 October 2021, he was selected by Alessandro Troncon to be part of an Italy A 28-man squad for the 2021 end-of-year rugby union internationals.

On 7 February 2022, Zambonin was selected by Kieran Crowley to be part of Italy squad for the 2022 Six Nations Championship. He made his debut against England.

On 1 May 2025, Zambonin agrees a move to England to join Exeter Chiefs in the Premiership Rugby competition ahead of the 2025-26 season.

His tries for Exeter :

1 st try : scored on April 12, 2026, against Benetton Treviso in the Challenge Cup (44–41 win).

2nd try (first in the Premiership): scored on May 31, 2026, against the Leicester Tigers in the league (35–26 win)
