= Alexandre Roumat =

French rugby union player (born 1997)

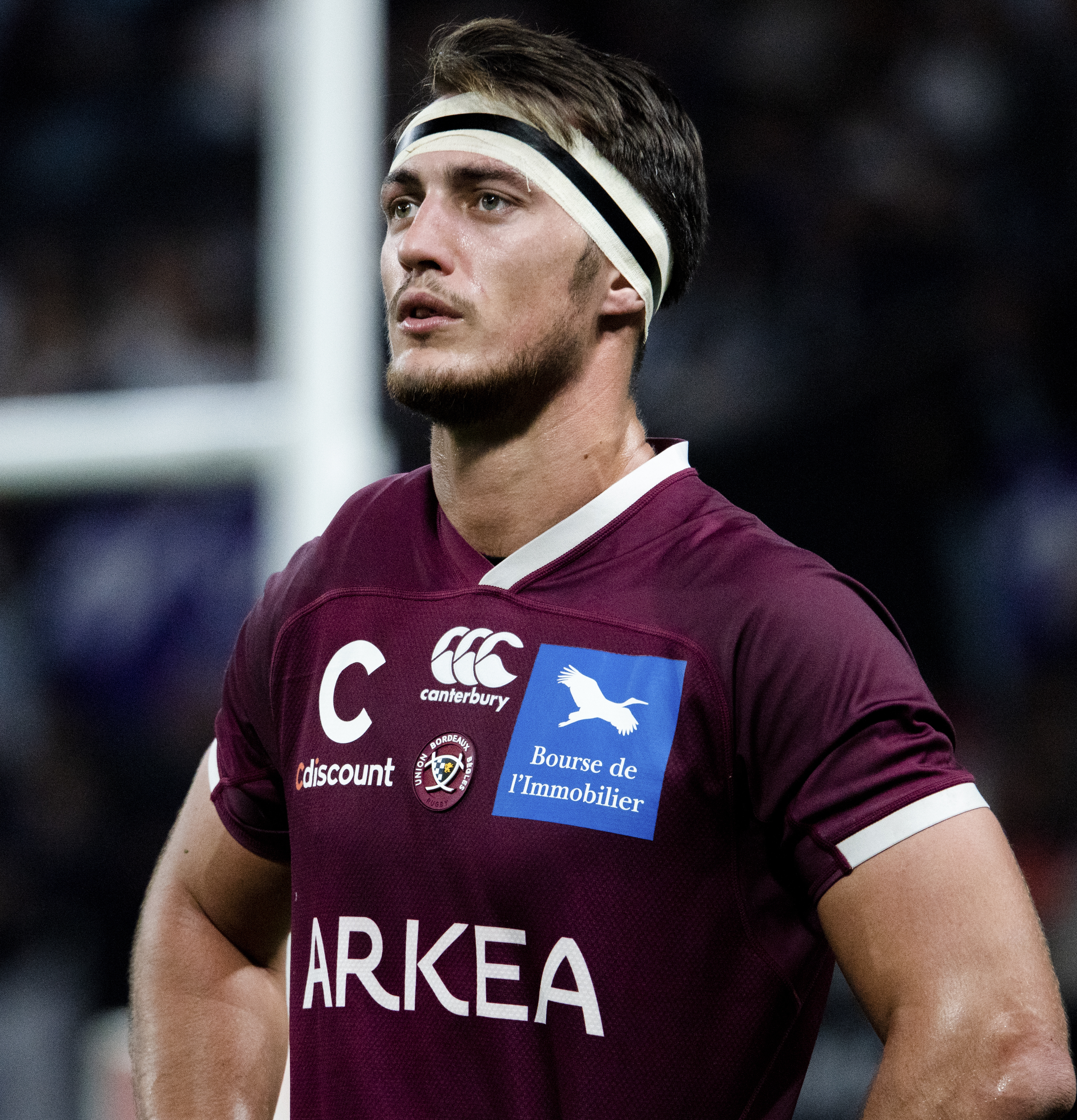
- Roumat with Bordeaux in 2019
- Born: Alexandre Roumat; 27 June 1997 (age 29) Dax, France
- Height: 1.98 m (6 ft 6 in)
- Weight: 110 kg (17 st 5 lb)

Rugby union career
- Position(s): Flanker, Number eight, Lock
- Current team: Toulouse
Youth career
- 2007–2011: Hossegor
- 2011–2012: Capbreton-Hossegor
- 2012–2015: Biarritz
Senior career
Years	Team	Apps	(Points)
2015–2017	Biarritz	32	(5)
2017–2022	Bordeaux Bègles	103	(20)
2022–	Toulouse	71	(40)
- Correct as of 1 March 2025
International career
Years	Team	Apps	(Points)
2016–2017	France U20	16	(15)
2024–	France	10	(5)
- Correct as of 23 February 2025

Alexandre Roumat (born 27 June 1997) is a French rugby union player. His position is flanker and he currently plays for Toulouse in the Top 14 and the France national team.

== Personal life ==
Roumat is the son of former French rugby union international player, Olivier Roumat.

== International career ==
=== International tries ===
International tries
No.	Date	Venue	Opponent	Score	Result	Competition
1	9 November 2024	Stade de France, Saint-Denis, France	Japan	17–0	52–12	2024 Autumn internationals

== Honours ==
France

- 1x Six Nations Championship: 2025

Toulouse

- 1× European Rugby Champions Cup: 2024
- 2× Top 14: 2023, 2024
