= Sébastien Taofifénua =

French rugby union player (born 1992)

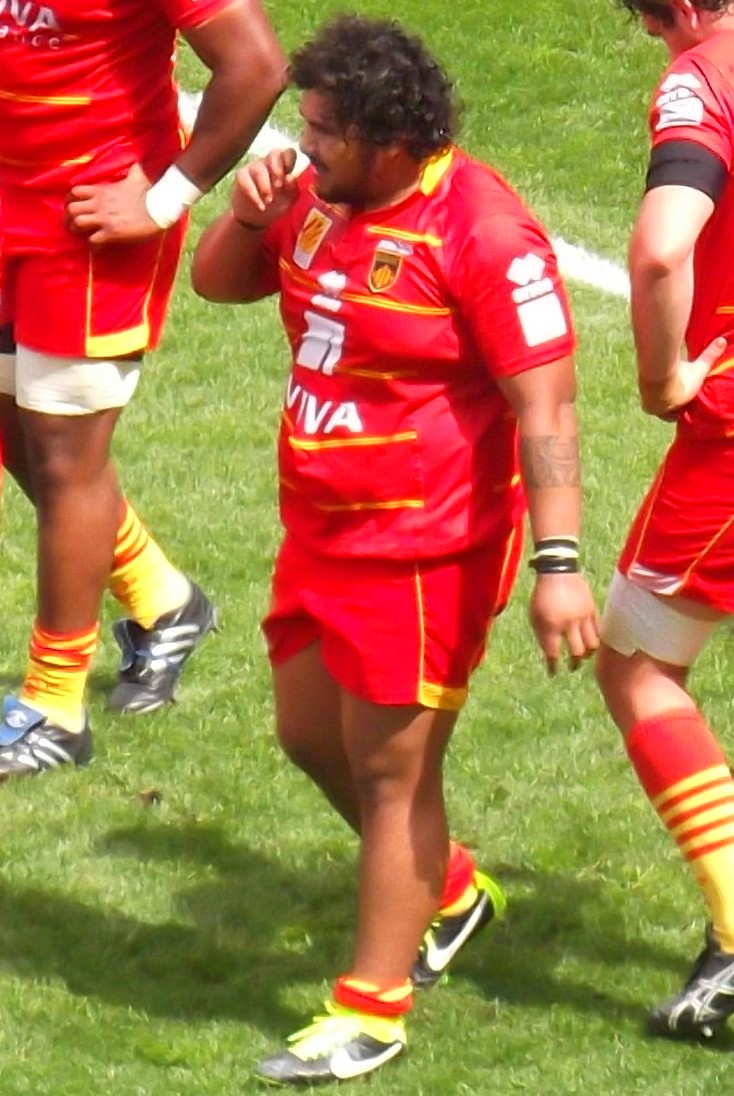
- Taofifénua with Perpignan in 2013
- Born: 21 March 1992 (age 34) Mont-de-Marsan, France
- Height: 1.78 m (5 ft 10 in)
- Weight: 130 kg (290 lb; 20 st 7 lb)

Rugby union career
- Position: Prop
Senior career
Years	Team	Apps	(Points)
2011–2014	Perpignan	55	(20)
2014–2018	Bordeaux Bègles	95	(30)
2018–	Toulon	40	(5)
- Correct as of 14 April 2018
International career
Years	Team	Apps	(Points)
2017	French Barbarians	1	(0)
2017–	France	9	(0)
- Correct as of 13 July 2024

Sébastien Taofifénua (born 21 March 1992) is a French rugby union player. His position is Prop and he currently plays for Toulon in the Top 14. He began his career at USA Perpignan.

== Personal life ==
Taofifénua is the son of Willy Taofifénua who used to play for FC Grenoble, and the younger brother of Romain Taofifénua, who also started his career with USA Perpignan.
