= 2025 Six Nations Championship =

International rugby union competition

2025 Men's Six Nations Championship
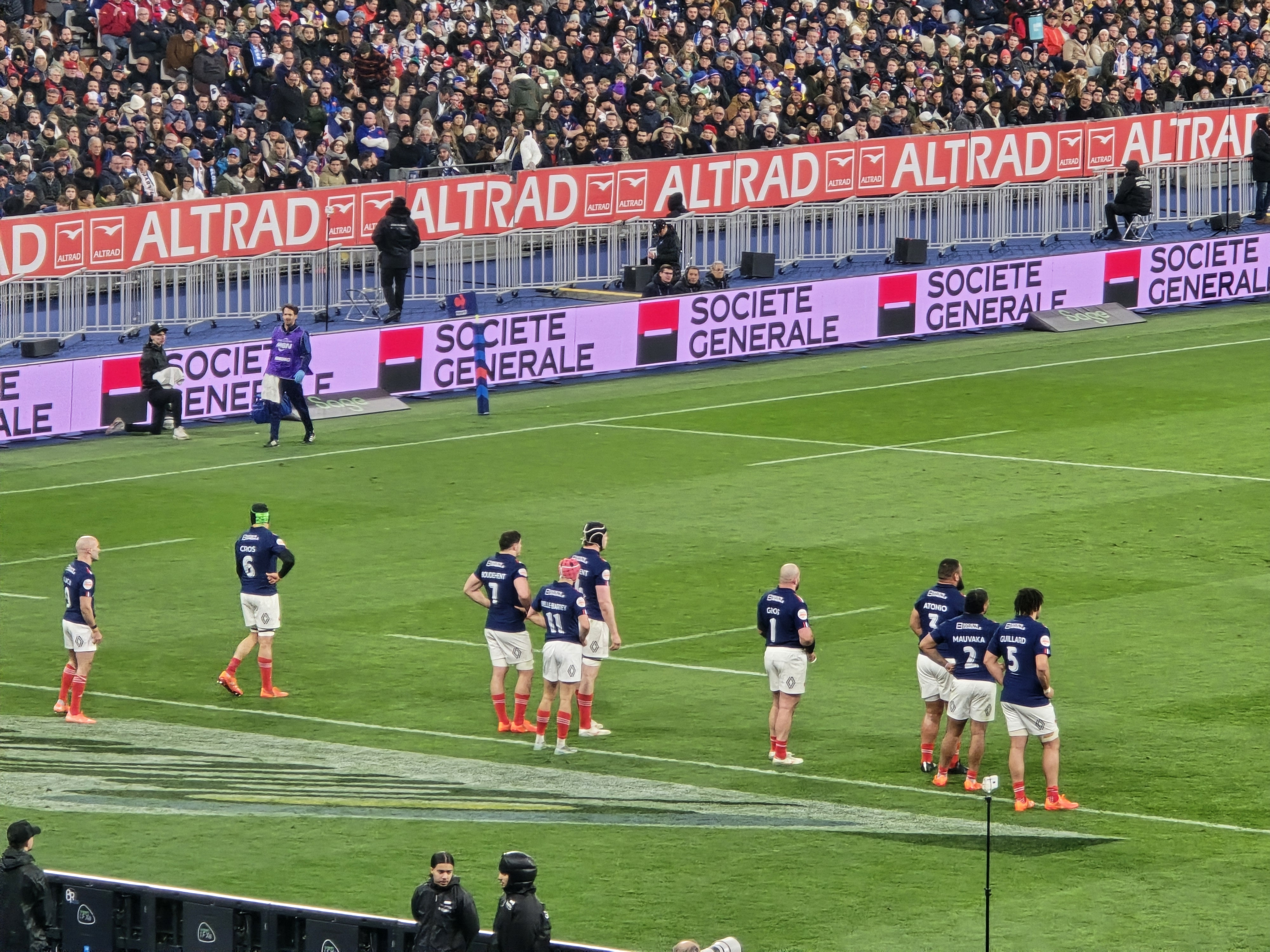
- French players lining up against Scotland
- Date: 31 January – 15 March 2025
- Countries: England; France; Ireland; Italy; Scotland; Wales

Tournament statistics
- Champions: France (19th title)
- Triple Crown: Ireland (14th title)
- Matches played: 15
- Attendance: 1,050,465 (70,031 per match)
- Tries scored: 108 (7.2 per match)
- Top point scorer: (France) Thomas Ramos (71)
- Top try scorer: (France) Louis Bielle-Biarrey (8)
- Player of the tournament: (France) Louis Bielle-Biarrey

The 2025 Men's Six Nations Championship (known as the Guinness Men's Six Nations for sponsorship reasons and branded as M6N) was a rugby union competition that took place from late January to mid-March 2025, featuring the men's national teams of England, France, Ireland, Italy, Scotland and Wales. It was the 131st season of the competition (including its incarnations as the Home Nations Championship and the Five Nations Championship), but the 26th since it expanded to become the Six Nations Championship in 2000. It started on 31 January 2025 with a Friday night match between France and Wales, and ended with France against Scotland on 15 March. Ireland entered the tournament as two-time reigning champions, aiming to become the first team to win the Championship outright three years in a row. France returned to their normal home venue, the Stade de France in Saint-Denis, after a year away while the stadium was being prepared for the 2024 Summer Olympics.

France won the championship in the final match, crowned Six Nations champions for the seventh time, their 19th outright title in all formats and their 27th title overall. Three teams – France, England and holders Ireland – won four games and lost a fifth, with France triumphing on bonus points. Wales finished with a second successive Wooden Spoon after losing all five games. No team won the Grand Slam, although Ireland completed their 14th Triple Crown before defeat to France. Their third-place finish was the worst of any Triple Crown-winning side; all previous winners had either won the championship or finished runners-up.

== Participants ==
Nation	Stadium			Head coach	Captain	World Rugby Ranking	
Nation	Home stadium	Capacity	Location	Head coach	Captain	Start (Note: As of 27 January 2025)	End (Note: As of 17 March 2025)
England	Twickenham Stadium	82,000	London	(England) Steve Borthwick	Maro Itoje	7th	6th
France	Stade de France	81,338	Saint-Denis	(France) Fabien Galthié	Antoine Dupont	4th	4th
Ireland	Aviva Stadium	51,700	Dublin	(Ireland) Simon Easterby (Note: Simon Easterby was named as the interim head coach of the Ireland team while Andy Farrell is in charge of the British & Irish Lions for their tour to Australia.)	Caelan Doris	2nd	3rd
Italy	Stadio Olimpico	73,261	Rome	(Argentina) Gonzalo Quesada	Michele Lamaro	10th	10th
Scotland	Murrayfield Stadium	67,144	Edinburgh	(Scotland) Gregor Townsend	Rory Darge (Note: Rory Darge and Finn Russell were named as co-captains of the Scotland team, after original captain Sione Tuipulotu was ruled out of the competition due to a rib injury.); Finn Russell	6th	7th
Wales	Millennium Stadium	73,931	Cardiff	(New Zealand) Warren Gatland (Note: Rounds 1 & 2) (England) Matt Sherratt (Note: Interim; round 3 onwards)	Jac Morgan	11th	12th

== Table ==
Pos	Team	Pld	W	D	L	PF	PA	PD	TF	TA	GS	TB	LB	Pts	FRA	ENG	IRE	SCO	ITA	WAL
1	France	5	4	0	1	218	93	+125	30	11	0	4	1	21	—			35–16		43–0
2	England	5	4	0	1	179	105	+74	25	15	0	3	1	20	26–25	—		16–15	47–24	
3	Ireland	5	4	0	1	135	117	+18	17	14	0	3	0	19	27–42	27–22	—			
4	Scotland	5	2	0	3	115	131	−16	16	14	0	2	1	11			18–32	—	31–19	35–29
5	Italy	5	1	0	4	106	188	−82	10	29	0	0	1	5	24–73		17–22		—	22–15
6	Wales	5	0	0	5	76	195	−119	10	25	0	1	2	3		14–68	18–27			—

Source: Six Nations Rugby
Legend: Blue = home team win; Yellow = draw; Red = away team win.

Table ranking rules

- Four points are awarded for a win.
- Two points are awarded for a draw.
- A bonus point is awarded to a team that scores four or more tries, or loses by seven points or fewer. If a team scores four or more tries, and loses by seven points or fewer, they are awarded both bonus points.
- Three bonus points are awarded to a team that wins all five of their matches (a Grand Slam). This ensures that a Grand Slam-winning team would top the table with at least 23 points, as there would otherwise be a scenario where a team could win all five matches with no bonus points for a total of 20 points and another team could win four matches with bonus points and lose their fifth match while claiming one or more bonus points giving a total of 21 or 22 points.
- Tiebreakers
  - If two or more teams are tied on table points, the team with the better points difference (points scored less points conceded) is ranked higher.
  - If the above tiebreaker fails to separate tied teams, the team that scores the higher number of total tries (including penalty tries) in their matches is ranked higher.
  - If two or more teams remain tied after applying the above tiebreakers then those teams will be placed at equal rank; if the tournament has concluded and more than one team is placed first then the title will be shared between them.

== Fixtures ==
The fixtures for the 2025 Six Nations were announced on 9 March 2024, beginning with a Friday night match between France and Wales in Saint-Denis.

=== Round 1 ===
31 January 2025
21:15 CET (UTC+1)

(1 BP) France	43–0	Wales
Try: Attissogbé (2) 18' c, 34' c Bielle-Biarrey (2) 23' c, 40+1' c Marchand 55' m Gailleton 68' m Alldritt 78' m Con: Ramos (4/5) 19', 24', 35', 40+2'	Report

Stade de France, Saint-Denis
Attendance: 77,752
Referee: Paul Williams (New Zealand)

FB	15	Thomas Ramos		(substituted off) 67'
RW	14	Théo Attissogbé
OC	13	Pierre-Louis Barassi
IC	12	Yoram Moefana
LW	11	Louis Bielle-Biarrey
FH	10	Romain Ntamack	(red card) 71'
SH	9	Antoine Dupont (c)		(substituted off) 50'
N8	8	Grégory Alldritt
OF	7	Paul Boudehent
BF	6	François Cros		(substituted off) 61'
RL	5	Emmanuel Meafou		(substituted off) 50'
LL	4	Alexandre Roumat		(substituted off) 50'
TP	3	Uini Atonio		(substituted off) 50'
HK	2	Peato Mauvaka		(substituted off) 50'
LP	1	Jean-Baptiste Gros		(substituted off) 50'
Replacements:
HK	16	Julien Marchand		(substituted on) 50'
PR	17	Cyril Baille		(substituted on) 50'
PR	18	Georges-Henri Colombe		(substituted on) 50'
LK	19	Hugo Auradou		(substituted on) 50'
FL	20	Mickaël Guillard		(substituted on) 50'
FL	21	Oscar Jégou		(substituted on) 61'
SH	22	Nolann Le Garrec		(substituted on) 50'
CE	23	Émilien Gailleton		(substituted on) 67'
Coach:
Fabien Galthié

FB	15	Liam Williams
RW	14	Tom Rogers		(substituted off) 62'
OC	13	Nick Tompkins
IC	12	Owen Watkin		(substituted off) 27'
LW	11	Josh Adams
FH	10	Ben Thomas
SH	9	Tomos Williams		(substituted off) 71'
N8	8	Aaron Wainwright		(substituted off) 4'
OF	7	Jac Morgan (c)
BF	6	James Botham		(substituted off) 64'
RL	5	Dafydd Jenkins
LL	4	Will Rowlands
TP	3	Henry Thomas		(substituted off) 46'
HK	2	Evan Lloyd	(yellow card) 31'				(substituted off) 46'
LP	1	Gareth Thomas		(substituted off) 46'
Replacements:
HK	16	Elliot Dee			(substituted on) 38'	(substituted off) 41'	(substituted on) 46'
PR	17	Nicky Smith		(substituted on) 46'
PR	18	Keiron Assiratti		(substituted on) 46'
LK	19	Freddie Thomas	(yellow card) 76'	(substituted on) 64'
FL	20	Tommy Reffell		(substituted on) 4'	(substituted off) 38'	(substituted on) 41'
SH	21	Rhodri Williams		(substituted on) 71'
FH	22	Dan Edwards		(substituted on) 27'
WG	23	Blair Murray		(substituted on) 62'
Coach:
Warren Gatland

Player of the Match:
Grégory Alldritt (France)

Assistant referees:
Andrea Piardi (Italy)
Jordan Way (Australia)
Television match official:
Brett Cronan (Australia)
Foul play review officer:
Damon Murphy (Australia)

Notes:

- Dan Edwards (Wales) made his international debut.
- Nicky Smith (Wales) earned his 50th test cap.
- France kept a clean sheet against Wales for the first time since the 1998 Five Nations.
- This was France's largest winning margin against Wales at home, surpassing the 33-point margin set in 1991.
- This was the first time Wales had failed to score a point in a Six Nations match, and the first time in any match since they lost 31–0 to Australia in 2007.
- This was Wales' 13th defeat in a row, which is now their longest losing streak.

1 February 2025
14:15 GMT (UTC+0)

(1 BP) Scotland	31–19	Italy
Try: Darge 3' c Jones (3) 8' c, 60' c, 65' m White 28' m Con: Russell (3/5) 4', 9', 61'	Report	Try: Brex 45' c Con: Allan (1/1) 46'; Pen: Allan (4/4) 20', 23', 38', 43'

Murrayfield Stadium, Edinburgh
Attendance: 67,144
Referee: Karl Dickson (England)

FB	15	Blair Kinghorn
RW	14	Darcy Graham	(substituted off) 72'
OC	13	Huw Jones
IC	12	Stafford McDowall	(substituted off) 56'
LW	11	Duhan van der Merwe
FH	10	Finn Russell (cc)
SH	9	Ben White	(substituted off) 56'
N8	8	Matt Fagerson
OF	7	Rory Darge (cc)
BF	6	Jamie Ritchie	(substituted off) 50'
RL	5	Grant Gilchrist
LL	4	Jonny Gray	(substituted off) 56'
TP	3	Zander Fagerson	(substituted off) 68'
HK	2	Dave Cherry	(substituted off) 50'
LP	1	Pierre Schoeman	(substituted off) 51'
Replacements:
HK	16	Ewan Ashman	(substituted on) 50'
PR	17	Rory Sutherland	(substituted on) 51'
PR	18	Will Hurd	(substituted on) 68'
LK	19	Gregor Brown	(substituted on) 56'
N8	20	Jack Dempsey	(substituted on) 50'
SH	21	George Horne	(substituted on) 56'
FH	22	Tom Jordan	(substituted on) 56'
WG	23	Kyle Rowe	(substituted on) 72'
Coach:
Gregor Townsend

FB	15	Tommaso Allan
RW	14	Ange Capuozzo
OC	13	Ignacio Brex
IC	12	Tommaso Menoncello
LW	11	Monty Ioane	(substituted off) 67'
FH	10	Paolo Garbisi
SH	9	Martin Page-Relo	(substituted off) 62'
N8	8	Lorenzo Cannone	(substituted off) 54'
OF	7	Michele Lamaro (c)	(substituted off) 62'
BF	6	Sebastian Negri
RL	5	Federico Ruzza	(substituted off) 42'	(substituted on) 54'
LL	4	Dino Lamb		(substituted off) 54'
TP	3	Simone Ferrari	(substituted off) 50'
HK	2	Giacomo Nicotera	(substituted off) 51'
LP	1	Danilo Fischetti	(substituted off) 67'
Replacements:
HK	16	Gianmarco Lucchesi	(substituted on) 51'
PR	17	Luca Rizzoli	(substituted on) 67'
PR	18	Marco Riccioni	(substituted on) 50'
LK	19	Niccolò Cannone	(substituted on) 42'
FL	20	Manuel Zuliani	(substituted on) 62'
N8	21	Ross Vintcent	(substituted on) 54'
SH	22	Alessandro Garbisi	(substituted on) 62'
WG	23	Simone Gesi	(substituted on) 67'
Coach:
Gonzalo Quesada

Player of the Match:
Huw Jones (Scotland)

Assistant referees:
Luke Pearce (England)
Damian Schneider (Argentina)
Television match official:
Marius Jonker (South Africa)
Foul play review officer:
Marius van der Westhuizen (South Africa)

Notes:

- Luca Rizzoli (Italy) made his international debut.
- Scotland reclaimed the Cuttitta Cup, having lost it in the previous year's tournament.

1 February 2025
16:45 GMT (UTC+0)

(1 BP) Ireland	27–22	England (1 BP)
Try: Gibson-Park 34' m Aki 51' m Beirne 63' c Sheehan 71' c Con: Crowley (2/2) 64', 72'; Pen: S. Prendergast (1/1) 55'	Report	Try: Murley 8' c T. Curry 75' m Freeman 80+1' c Con: M. Smith (2/3) 9', 80+1'; Pen: M. Smith (1/1) 40'

Aviva Stadium, Dublin
Attendance: 51,700
Referee: Ben O'Keeffe (New Zealand)

FB	15	Hugo Keenan
RW	14	Mack Hansen	(substituted off) 3'	(substituted on) 16'
OC	13	Garry Ringrose
IC	12	Bundee Aki			(substituted off) 57'
LW	11	James Lowe
FH	10	Sam Prendergast	(substituted off) 58'
SH	9	Jamison Gibson-Park	(substituted off) 74'
N8	8	Caelan Doris (c)
OF	7	Josh van der Flier
BF	6	Ryan Baird	(substituted off) 49'
RL	5	Tadhg Beirne
LL	4	James Ryan	(substituted off) 61'
TP	3	Finlay Bealham	(substituted off) 58'
HK	2	Rónan Kelleher	(substituted off) 49'
LP	1	Andrew Porter	(substituted off) 73'
Replacements:
HK	16	Dan Sheehan	(substituted on) 49'
PR	17	Cian Healy	(substituted on) 73'
PR	18	Tom Clarkson	(substituted on) 58'
LK	19	Iain Henderson	(substituted on) 61'
N8	20	Jack Conan	(substituted on) 49'
SH	21	Conor Murray	(substituted on) 74'
FH	22	Jack Crowley	(substituted on) 58'
CE	23	Robbie Henshaw	(substituted on) 3'	(substituted off) 16'	(substituted on) 57'
Coach:
Simon Easterby

FB	15	Freddie Steward		(substituted off) 64'
RW	14	Tommy Freeman
OC	13	Ollie Lawrence
IC	12	Henry Slade
LW	11	Cadan Murley
FH	10	Marcus Smith	(yellow card) 25'
SH	9	Alex Mitchell		(substituted off) 64'
N8	8	Ben Earl		(substituted off) 55'
OF	7	Ben Curry		(substituted off) 59'
BF	6	Tom Curry
RL	5	George Martin		(substituted off) 59'
LL	4	Maro Itoje (c)
TP	3	Will Stuart		(substituted off) 37'	(substituted on) 40'	(substituted off) 49'	(substituted on) 59'	(substituted off) 70'
HK	2	Luke Cowan-Dickie		(substituted off) 55'
LP	1	Ellis Genge		(substituted off) 70'
Replacements:
HK	16	Theo Dan		(substituted on) 55'
PR	17	Fin Baxter		(substituted on) 70'
PR	18	Joe Heyes		(substituted on) 37'	(substituted off) 40'	(substituted on) 49'	(substituted off) 59'	(substituted on) 70'
LK	19	Ollie Chessum		(substituted on) 59'
FL	20	Chandler Cunningham-South		(substituted on) 59'
N8	21	Tom Willis		(substituted on) 55'
SH	22	Harry Randall		(substituted on) 64'
FH	23	Fin Smith		(substituted on) 64'
Coach:
Steve Borthwick

Player of the Match:
Jamison Gibson-Park (Ireland)

Assistant referees:
James Doleman (New Zealand)
Hollie Davidson (Scotland)
Television match official:
Glenn Newman (New Zealand)
Foul play review officer:
Richard Kelly (New Zealand)

Notes:

- Cadan Murley (England) made his international debut.
- Ireland reclaimed the Millennium Trophy, having lost it in the previous year's tournament.

=== Round 2 ===
8 February 2025
15:15 CET (UTC+1)

Italy	22–15	Wales (1 BP)
Try: Capuozzo 20' c Con: Allan (1/1) 21'; Pen: Allan (5/7) 7', 29', 34', 61', 74'	Report	Try: Wainwright 69' m Penalty try 79'; Pen: B. Thomas (1/1) 17'

Stadio Olimpico, Rome
Attendance: 60,518
Referee: Matthew Carley (England)

FB	15	Tommaso Allan				(substituted off) 74'
RW	14	Ange Capuozzo
OC	13	Ignacio Brex
IC	12	Tommaso Menoncello
LW	11	Monty Ioane
FH	10	Paolo Garbisi		(substituted off) 59'	(substituted on) 69'
SH	9	Martin Page-Relo		(substituted off) 69'
N8	8	Lorenzo Cannone
OF	7	Michele Lamaro (c)		(substituted off) 67'
BF	6	Sebastian Negri		(substituted off) 62'
RL	5	Federico Ruzza		(substituted off) 62'
LL	4	Niccolò Cannone
TP	3	Simone Ferrari		(substituted off) 53'
HK	2	Giacomo Nicotera		(substituted off) 53'
LP	1	Danilo Fischetti		(substituted off) 67'
Replacements:
HK	16	Gianmarco Lucchesi		(substituted on) 53'
PR	17	Luca Rizzoli		(substituted on) 67'
PR	18	Marco Riccioni	(yellow card) 78'	(substituted on) 53'
LK	19	Dino Lamb	(yellow card) 79'	(substituted on) 62'
FL	20	Manuel Zuliani		(substituted on) 67'
FL	21	Ross Vintcent		(substituted on) 62'
SH	22	Alessandro Garbisi		(substituted on) 69'
WG	23	Jacopo Trulla		(substituted on) 59'	(substituted off) 69'	(substituted on) 74'
Coach:
Gonzalo Quesada

FB	15	Blair Murray
RW	14	Tom Rogers				(substituted off) 62'
OC	13	Nick Tompkins		(substituted off) 17'	(substituted on) 28'
IC	12	Eddie James
LW	11	Josh Adams	(yellow card) 59'
FH	10	Ben Thomas		(substituted off) 49'
SH	9	Tomos Williams		(substituted off) 67'
N8	8	Taulupe Faletau
OF	7	Jac Morgan (c)
BF	6	James Botham		(substituted off) 58'
RL	5	Freddie Thomas
LL	4	Will Rowlands		(substituted off) 58'
TP	3	Henry Thomas		(substituted off) 45'
HK	2	Evan Lloyd		(substituted off) 45'
LP	1	Gareth Thomas		(substituted off) 45'
Replacements:
HK	16	Elliot Dee		(substituted on) 45'
PR	17	Nicky Smith		(substituted on) 45'
PR	18	Keiron Assiratti		(substituted on) 45'
LK	19	Teddy Williams		(substituted on) 58'
FL	20	Aaron Wainwright		(substituted on) 58'
SH	21	Rhodri Williams		(substituted on) 67'
FH	22	Dan Edwards		(substituted on) 49'
WG	23	Josh Hathaway		(substituted on) 17'	(substituted off) 28'	(substituted on) 62'
Coach:
Warren Gatland

Player of the Match:
Lorenzo Cannone (Italy)

Assistant referees:
Paul Williams (New Zealand)
Sam Grove-White (Scotland)
Television match official:
Eric Gauzins (France)
Foul play review officer:
Glenn Newman (New Zealand)

Notes:

- Dafydd Jenkins and Liam Williams (Wales) were originally named to start the match, but withdrew prior to kick-off due to illness and injury, respectively. They were replaced by Freddie Thomas and Blair Murray, whose places on the bench were taken by Teddy Williams and Josh Hathaway.
- Italy recorded back-to-back victories over Wales for the first time, and their first home win against the nation since 2007.
- With this defeat, Wales dropped to 12th place in the World Rugby Rankings – their worst position since the rankings were established in 2003.
- This was Warren Gatland's last match as Wales head coach, as he left the role by mutual consent on 11 February. He was replaced by Matt Sherratt from 17 February.

8 February 2025
16:45 GMT (UTC+0)

(1 BP) England	26–25	France (1 BP)
Try: Lawrence 36' c Freeman 58' m Baxter 70' c Daly 79' c Con: M. Smith (1/2) 37'; F. Smith (2/2) 71', 80'	Report	Try: Bielle-Biarrey (2) 30' c, 75' c Penaud 61' m Con: Ramos (2/3) 31', 76'; Pen: Ramos (2/3) 50', 56'

Twickenham Stadium, London
Attendance: 81,000
Referee: Nika Amashukeli (Georgia)

FB	15	Marcus Smith
RW	14	Tommy Freeman
OC	13	Ollie Lawrence
IC	12	Henry Slade	(substituted off) 76'
LW	11	Ollie Sleightholme
FH	10	Fin Smith
SH	9	Alex Mitchell
N8	8	Tom Willis	(substituted off) 54'
OF	7	Ben Earl
BF	6	Tom Curry
RL	5	George Martin	(substituted off) 62'
LL	4	Maro Itoje (c)
TP	3	Will Stuart	(substituted off) 59'
HK	2	Luke Cowan-Dickie	(substituted off) 62'
LP	1	Ellis Genge	(substituted off) 52'
Replacements:
HK	16	Jamie George	(substituted on) 62'
PR	17	Fin Baxter	(substituted on) 52'
PR	18	Joe Heyes	(substituted on) 59'
LK	19	Ollie Chessum	(substituted on) 62'
FL	20	Chandler Cunningham-South
FL	21	Ben Curry	(substituted on) 54'
SH	22	Harry Randall
FB	23	Elliot Daly	(substituted on) 76'
Coach:
Steve Borthwick

FB	15	Thomas Ramos
RW	14	Damian Penaud
OC	13	Pierre-Louis Barassi
IC	12	Yoram Moefana
LW	11	Louis Bielle-Biarrey
FH	10	Matthieu Jalibert	(substituted off) 67'
SH	9	Antoine Dupont (c)
N8	8	Grégory Alldritt
OF	7	Paul Boudehent	(substituted off) 50'
BF	6	François Cros
RL	5	Emmanuel Meafou	(substituted off) 67'
LL	4	Alexandre Roumat	(substituted off) 50'
TP	3	Uini Atonio	(substituted off) 57'
HK	2	Peato Mauvaka	(substituted off) 57'
LP	1	Jean-Baptiste Gros	(substituted off) 57'
Replacements:
HK	16	Julien Marchand	(substituted on) 57'
PR	17	Cyril Baille	(substituted on) 57'
PR	18	Georges-Henri Colombe	(substituted on) 57'
LK	19	Hugo Auradou	(substituted on) 50'
FL	20	Mickaël Guillard	(substituted on) 67'
FL	21	Oscar Jégou	(substituted on) 50'
SH	22	Nolann Le Garrec	(substituted on) 67'
CE	23	Émilien Gailleton
Coach:
Fabien Galthié

Player of the Match:
Fin Smith (England)

Assistant referees:
Andrea Piardi (Italy)
Damian Schneider (Argentina)
Television match official:
Marius van der Westhuizen (South Africa)
Foul play review officer:
Marius Jonker (South Africa)

Notes:

- England claimed victory in Le Crunch for the first time since 2021.

9 February 2025
15:00 GMT (UTC+0)

Scotland	18–32	Ireland (1 BP)
Try: Van der Merwe 40+1' m White 76' c Con: Kinghorn (1/2) 76'; Pen: Kinghorn (2/2) 43', 49'	Report	Try: Nash 8' c Doris 31' c Lowe 54' c Conan 59' m Con: S. Prendergast (3/4) 9', 32', 55'; Pen: S. Prendergast (2/2) 23', 70'

Murrayfield Stadium, Edinburgh
Attendance: 67,144
Referee: James Doleman (New Zealand)

FB	15	Blair Kinghorn
RW	14	Darcy Graham		(substituted off) 22'
OC	13	Huw Jones
IC	12	Tom Jordan
LW	11	Duhan van der Merwe	(yellow card) 14'
FH	10	Finn Russell (cc)		(substituted off) 22'
SH	9	Ben White
N8	8	Jack Dempsey		(substituted off) 61'
OF	7	Rory Darge (cc)
BF	6	Matt Fagerson
RL	5	Grant Gilchrist		(substituted off) 68'
LL	4	Jonny Gray		(substituted off) 48'
TP	3	Zander Fagerson		(substituted off) 68'
HK	2	Dave Cherry		(substituted off) 48'
LP	1	Rory Sutherland		(substituted off) 48'
Replacements:
HK	16	Ewan Ashman		(substituted on) 48'
PR	17	Pierre Schoeman		(substituted on) 48'
PR	18	Will Hurd		(substituted on) 68'
LK	19	Sam Skinner		(substituted on) 68'
LK	20	Gregor Brown		(substituted on) 48'
FL	21	Jamie Ritchie		(substituted on) 61'
SH	22	Jamie Dobie		(substituted on) 22'
CE	23	Stafford McDowall		(substituted on) 22'
Coach:
Gregor Townsend

FB	15	Hugo Keenan
RW	14	Calvin Nash	(substituted off) 65'
OC	13	Robbie Henshaw
IC	12	Bundee Aki	(substituted off) 58'
LW	11	James Lowe
FH	10	Sam Prendergast
SH	9	Jamison Gibson-Park	(substituted off) 69'
N8	8	Caelan Doris (c)
OF	7	Josh van der Flier
BF	6	Peter O'Mahony				(substituted off) 52'
RL	5	Tadhg Beirne	(substituted off) 10'		(substituted on) 19'
LL	4	James Ryan			(substituted off) 65'
TP	3	Finlay Bealham	(substituted off) 61'
HK	2	Rónan Kelleher	(substituted off) 41'
LP	1	Andrew Porter	(substituted off) 70'
Replacements:
HK	16	Dan Sheehan	(substituted on) 41'
PR	17	Cian Healy	(substituted on) 70'
PR	18	Tom Clarkson	(substituted on) 61'
LK	19	Ryan Baird	(substituted on) 10'	(substituted off) 14'	(substituted on) 65'
N8	20	Jack Conan		(substituted on) 14'	(substituted off) 19'	(substituted on) 52'
SH	21	Conor Murray	(substituted on) 69'
FH	22	Jack Crowley	(substituted on) 65'
CE	23	Garry Ringrose	(substituted on) 58'
Coach:
Simon Easterby

Player of the Match:
Sam Prendergast (Ireland)

Assistant referees:
Ben O'Keeffe (New Zealand)
Luc Ramos (France)
Television match official:
Richard Kelly (New Zealand)
Foul play review officer:
Andrew Jackson (England)

Notes:

- Mack Hansen (Ireland) was originally named in the starting line-up, but withdrew the day before the match due to a hamstring injury. He was replaced by Calvin Nash.
- This was Ireland's 11th consecutive victory over Scotland.
- Cian Healy made his 66th Six Nations appearance, to become Ireland's most capped player in the tournament's history – breaking the record previously held by Brian O'Driscoll. In doing so, he also moved to third on the all-time list for most Six Nations caps, behind Sergio Parisse (Italy) and Alun Wyn Jones (Wales).

=== Round 3 ===
22 February 2025
14:15 GMT (UTC+0)

Wales	18–27	Ireland
Try: Morgan 40+3' c Rogers 43' m Con: Anscombe (1/2) 40+4'; Pen: Anscombe (2/2) 23', 35'	Report	Try: Conan 7' c Osborne 56' m Con: Prendergast (1/2) 8'; Pen: Prendergast (5/6) 21', 49', 67', 70', 78'

Millennium Stadium, Cardiff
Attendance: 73,623
Referee: Christophe Ridley (England)

FB	15	Blair Murray
RW	14	Tom Rogers	(substituted off) 63'
OC	13	Max Llewellyn
IC	12	Ben Thomas
LW	11	Ellis Mee
FH	10	Gareth Anscombe	(substituted off) 53'
SH	9	Tomos Williams
N8	8	Taulupe Faletau
OF	7	Tommy Reffell	(substituted off) 57'
BF	6	Jac Morgan (c)
RL	5	Dafydd Jenkins
LL	4	Will Rowlands	(substituted off) 72'
TP	3	WillGriff John	(substituted off) 53'
HK	2	Elliot Dee	(substituted off) 74'
LP	1	Nicky Smith	(substituted off) 19'	(substituted on) 31'	(substituted off) 62'
Replacements:
HK	16	Evan Lloyd	(substituted on) 74'
PR	17	Gareth Thomas	(substituted on) 19'	(substituted off) 31'	(substituted on) 62'
PR	18	Henry Thomas	(substituted on) 53'
LK	19	Teddy Williams	(substituted on) 72'
N8	20	Aaron Wainwright	(substituted on) 57'
SH	21	Rhodri Williams
FH	22	Jarrod Evans	(substituted on) 53'
CE	23	Joe Roberts	(substituted on) 63'
Coach:
Matt Sherratt

FB	15	Jamie Osborne
RW	14	Mack Hansen		(substituted off) 73'
OC	13	Garry Ringrose	(red card) 32'	(substituted off) 52'
IC	12	Robbie Henshaw
LW	11	James Lowe
FH	10	Sam Prendergast
SH	9	Jamison Gibson-Park		(substituted off) 79'
N8	8	Jack Conan		(substituted off) 44'
OF	7	Josh van der Flier
BF	6	Peter O'Mahony
RL	5	Tadhg Beirne
LL	4	Joe McCarthy		(substituted off) 40'	(substituted on) 50'	(substituted off) 65'
TP	3	Tom Clarkson		(substituted off) 49'
HK	2	Dan Sheehan (c)		(substituted off) 75'
LP	1	Andrew Porter		(substituted off) 71'
Replacements:
HK	16	Gus McCarthy		(substituted on) 75'
PR	17	Jack Boyle		(substituted on) 71'
PR	18	Finlay Bealham		(substituted on) 49'
LK	19	James Ryan		(substituted on) 40'	(substituted off) 50'	(substituted on) 65'
LK	20	Ryan Baird		(substituted on) 44'
SH	21	Conor Murray		(substituted on) 79'
FH	22	Jack Crowley		(substituted on) 73'
CE	23	Bundee Aki		(substituted on) 52'
Coach:
Simon Easterby

Player of the Match:
Jamison Gibson-Park (Ireland)

Assistant referees:
Nika Amashukeli (Georgia)
Gianluca Gnecchi (Italy)
Television match official:
Ian Tempest (England)
Foul play review officer:
Matteo Liperini (Italy)

Notes:

- Cian Prendergast (Ireland) was originally named among the replacements but was ruled out due to illness; he was replaced on the bench by Ryan Baird.
- Ellis Mee (Wales) and Jack Boyle (Ireland) made their international debuts.
- Ireland won the Triple Crown for the 14th time.

22 February 2025
16:45 GMT (UTC+0)

England	16–15	Scotland (1 BP)
Try: Freeman 9' c Con: M. Smith (1/1) 9'; Pen: M. Smith (2/2) 56', 67'; F. Smith (1/1) 70'	Report	Try: White 4' m Jones 19' m Van der Merwe 79' m

Twickenham Stadium, London
Referee: Pierre Brousset (France)

FB	15	Marcus Smith
RW	14	Tommy Freeman
OC	13	Ollie Lawrence
IC	12	Henry Slade
LW	11	Ollie Sleightholme	(substituted off) 45'
FH	10	Fin Smith
SH	9	Alex Mitchell	(substituted off) 62'
N8	8	Tom Willis	(substituted off) 37'
OF	7	Ben Earl
BF	6	Tom Curry	(substituted off) 47'
RL	5	Ollie Chessum	(substituted off) 80'
LL	4	Maro Itoje (c)
TP	3	Will Stuart	(substituted off) 71'
HK	2	Luke Cowan-Dickie	(substituted off) 45'
LP	1	Ellis Genge	(substituted off) 58'
Replacements:
HK	16	Jamie George	(substituted on) 45'
PR	17	Fin Baxter	(substituted on) 58'
PR	18	Joe Heyes	(substituted on) 71'
FL	19	Ted Hill	(substituted on) 80'
FL	20	Chandler Cunningham-South	(substituted on) 47'
FL	21	Ben Curry	(substituted on) 37'
SH	22	Harry Randall	(substituted on) 62'
FB	23	Elliot Daly	(substituted on) 45'
Coach:
Steve Borthwick

FB	15	Blair Kinghorn
RW	14	Kyle Rowe
OC	13	Huw Jones	(substituted off) 65'
IC	12	Tom Jordan
LW	11	Duhan van der Merwe
FH	10	Finn Russell (cc)
SH	9	Ben White	(substituted off) 65'
N8	8	Jack Dempsey	(substituted off) 55'
OF	7	Rory Darge (cc)
BF	6	Jamie Ritchie
RL	5	Grant Gilchrist	(substituted off) 71'
LL	4	Jonny Gray	(substituted off) 62'
TP	3	Zander Fagerson	(substituted off) 77'
HK	2	Dave Cherry	(substituted off) 55'
LP	1	Pierre Schoeman	(substituted off) 71'
Replacements:
HK	16	Ewan Ashman	(substituted on) 55'
PR	17	Jamie Bhatti	(substituted on) 71'
PR	18	Will Hurd	(substituted on) 77'
LK	19	Sam Skinner	(substituted on) 62'
FL	20	Gregor Brown	(substituted on) 71'
N8	21	Matt Fagerson	(substituted on) 55'
SH	22	Jamie Dobie	(substituted on) 65'
CE	23	Stafford McDowall	(substituted on) 65'
Coach:
Gregor Townsend

Player of the Match:
Duhan van der Merwe (Scotland)

Assistant referees:
Andrew Brace (Ireland)
Luc Ramos (France)
Television match official:
Tual Trainini (France)
Foul play review officer:
Quinton Immelman (South Africa)

Notes:

- George Martin (England) was originally named among the replacements, but was ruled out with a knee injury; he was replaced on the bench by Ted Hill.
- Rory Sutherland (Scotland) was originally named among the replacements, but was ruled out with a back injury; he was replaced on the bench by Jamie Bhatti.
- England won the Calcutta Cup for the first time since 2020, and for the first time at home since 2017.

23 February 2025
16:00 CET (UTC+1)

Italy	24–73	France (1 BP)
Try: Menoncello 11' c Brex 28' c P. Garbisi 61' c Con: Allan (2/2) 12', 29'; P. Garbisi (1/1) 61'; Pen: Allan (1/2) 18'	Report	Try: Guillard 14' c Mauvaka 21' c Dupont (2) 24' c, 54' c Boudehent 30' c Barré (2) 39' c, 65' c Alldritt 45' c Bielle-Biarrey 50' m Attissogbé 76' c Barassi 80' m Con: Ramos (8/9) 15', 22', 25', 31', 40', 46', 55', 66'; Lucu (1/2) 77'

Stadio Olimpico, Rome
Attendance: 65,766
Referee: Karl Dickson (England)

FB	15	Tommaso Allan	(substituted off) 55'
RW	14	Ange Capuozzo
OC	13	Ignacio Brex
IC	12	Tommaso Menoncello
LW	11	Simone Gesi
FH	10	Paolo Garbisi
SH	9	Martin Page-Relo	(substituted off) 59'
N8	8	Lorenzo Cannone	(substituted off) 55'
OF	7	Michele Lamaro (c)		(substituted off) 62'
BF	6	Sebastian Negri	(substituted off) 49'	(substituted on) 62'
RL	5	Federico Ruzza
LL	4	Niccolò Cannone	(substituted off) 73'
TP	3	Simone Ferrari	(substituted off) 46'
HK	2	Gianmarco Lucchesi	(substituted off) 46'
LP	1	Danilo Fischetti	(substituted off) 17'
Replacements:
HK	16	Giacomo Nicotera	(substituted on) 46'
PR	17	Mirco Spagnolo	(substituted on) 17'
PR	18	Giosuè Zilocchi	(substituted on) 46'
LK	19	Riccardo Favretto	(substituted on) 73'
FL	20	Manuel Zuliani	(substituted on) 49'
FL	21	Ross Vintcent	(substituted on) 55'
SH	22	Alessandro Garbisi	(substituted on) 59'
WG	23	Jacopo Trulla	(substituted on) 55'
Coach:
Gonzalo Quesada

FB	15	Léo Barré
RW	14	Théo Attissogbé
OC	13	Pierre-Louis Barassi
IC	12	Yoram Moefana
LW	11	Louis Bielle-Biarrey
FH	10	Thomas Ramos	(substituted off) 68'
SH	9	Antoine Dupont (c)
N8	8	Grégory Alldritt	(substituted off) 49'
OF	7	Paul Boudehent	(substituted off) 49'
BF	6	François Cros
RL	5	Mickaël Guillard	(substituted off) 49'
LL	4	Thibaud Flament	(substituted off) 66'
TP	3	Uini Atonio	(substituted off) 49'
HK	2	Peato Mauvaka	(substituted off) 49'
LP	1	Jean-Baptiste Gros	(substituted off) 49'
Replacements:
HK	16	Julien Marchand	(substituted on) 49'
PR	17	Cyril Baille	(substituted on) 49'
PR	18	Dorian Aldegheri	(substituted on) 49'
LK	19	Romain Taofifénua	(substituted on) 49'
FL	20	Alexandre Roumat	(substituted on) 66'
FL	21	Oscar Jégou	(substituted on) 49'
FL	22	Anthony Jelonch	(substituted on) 49'
SH	23	Maxime Lucu	(substituted on) 68'
Coach:
Fabien Galthié

Player of the Match:
Antoine Dupont (France)

Assistant referees:
Craig Evans (Wales)
Eoghan Cross (Ireland)
Television match official:
Ben Whitehouse (Wales)
Foul play review officer:
Mike Adamson (Scotland)

Notes

- Niccolò Cannone and Danilo Fischetti (both Italy) earned their 50th test caps.
- This was France's highest ever points total against Italy, as well as their largest ever away victory in the tournament.
- This match broke the record for the most tries in a Six Nations fixture with 14 – breaking the previous record of 12.

=== Round 4 ===
8 March 2025
14:15 GMT (UTC+0)

Ireland	27–42	France (1 BP)
Try: Sheehan 43' c Healy 77' c Conan 80+1' c Con: Prendergast (3/3) 44', 78', 80+1'; Pen: Prendergast (2/3) 35', 40+3'	Report	Try: Bielle-Biarrey (2) 21' m, 50' c Boudehent 47' c Jégou 59' c Penaud 75' c Con: Ramos (4/5) 47', 51', 60', 75'; Pen: Ramos (3/3) 36', 56', 68'

Aviva Stadium, Dublin
Attendance: 51,700
Referee: Angus Gardner (Australia)

FB	15	Hugo Keenan
RW	14	Jamie Osborne
OC	13	Robbie Henshaw
IC	12	Bundee Aki		(substituted off) 56'
LW	11	Calvin Nash	(yellow card) 46'
FH	10	Sam Prendergast
SH	9	Jamison Gibson-Park		(substituted off) 69'
N8	8	Caelan Doris (c)			(substituted off) 65'	(substituted on) 76'
OF	7	Josh van der Flier		(substituted off) 49'	(substituted on) 65'	(substituted off) 76'
BF	6	Peter O'Mahony		(substituted off) 49'
RL	5	Tadhg Beirne
LL	4	Joe McCarthy	(yellow card) 20'	(substituted off) 58'
TP	3	Finlay Bealham		(substituted off) 60'
HK	2	Dan Sheehan		(substituted off) 69'
LP	1	Andrew Porter		(substituted off) 69'
Replacements:
HK	16	Rob Herring		(substituted on) 69'
PR	17	Cian Healy		(substituted on) 69'
PR	18	Tom Clarkson		(substituted on) 60'
LK	19	James Ryan		(substituted on) 58'
N8	20	Jack Conan		(substituted on) 49'
FL	21	Ryan Baird		(substituted on) 49'
SH	22	Conor Murray		(substituted on) 69'
FH	23	Jack Crowley		(substituted on) 56'
Coach:
Simon Easterby

FB	15	Thomas Ramos
RW	14	Damian Penaud
OC	13	Pierre-Louis Barassi		(substituted off) 47'
IC	12	Yoram Moefana
LW	11	Louis Bielle-Biarrey
FH	10	Romain Ntamack
SH	9	Antoine Dupont (c)		(substituted off) 29'
N8	8	Grégory Alldritt		(substituted off) 49'
OF	7	Paul Boudehent
BF	6	François Cros	(yellow card) 74'
RL	5	Mickaël Guillard		(substituted off) 49'
LL	4	Thibaud Flament		(substituted off) 76'
TP	3	Uini Atonio		(substituted off) 49'
HK	2	Peato Mauvaka		(substituted off) 49'
LP	1	Jean-Baptiste Gros		(substituted off) 49'
Replacements:
HK	16	Julien Marchand		(substituted on) 49'
PR	17	Cyril Baille		(substituted on) 49'
PR	18	Dorian Aldegheri		(substituted on) 49'
LK	19	Emmanuel Meafou		(substituted on) 49'
LK	20	Hugo Auradou		(substituted on) 76'
FL	21	Oscar Jégou		(substituted on) 47'
FL	22	Anthony Jelonch		(substituted on) 49'
SH	23	Maxime Lucu		(substituted on) 29'
Coach:
Fabien Galthié

Player of the Match:
Louis Bielle-Biarrey (France)

Assistant referees:
Matthew Carley (England)
Christophe Ridley (England)
Television match official:
Ian Tempest (England)
Foul play review officer:
Andrew Jackson (England)

Notes:

- James Lowe (Ireland) was originally named in the starting line-up, but withdrew during the pre-match warm-up due to a back injury; he was replaced by Calvin Nash.
- Finlay Bealham, Jack Conan and Caelan Doris (all Ireland) earned their 50th test caps.
- This was France's biggest ever away win against Ireland.
- Damian Penaud scored his 38th international try, to become France's joint top try scorer in test history (tied with Serge Blanco).
- Louis Bielle-Biarrey (France) equalled the record for most tries scored by one player in a single Six Nations tournament (seven, tied with Jacob Stockdale). He also set a new record for most tries scored by a French player in one tournament.

8 March 2025
16:45 GMT (UTC+0)

(1 BP) Scotland	35–29	Wales (2 BP)
Try: Kinghorn (2) 5' c, 48' c Jordan (2) 11' c, 33' c Graham 27' c Con: Russell (5/5) 6', 12', 28', 34', 49'	Report	Try: Murray 24' m B. Thomas 61' c Te. Williams 68' c Llewellyn 80+4' c Con: Evans (3/3) 62', 69', 80+4'; Pen: Anscombe (1/1) 3'

Murrayfield Stadium, Edinburgh
Referee: Andrea Piardi (Italy)

FB	15	Blair Kinghorn
RW	14	Darcy Graham	(substituted off) 67'
OC	13	Huw Jones
IC	12	Tom Jordan
LW	11	Duhan van der Merwe
FH	10	Finn Russell (cc)	(substituted off) 62'
SH	9	Ben White	(substituted off) 56'
N8	8	Jack Dempsey
OF	7	Rory Darge (cc)	(substituted off) 36'
BF	6	Jamie Ritchie
RL	5	Grant Gilchrist
LL	4	Jonny Gray	(substituted off) 67'
TP	3	Zander Fagerson	(substituted off) 62'
HK	2	Dave Cherry	(substituted off) 56'
LP	1	Pierre Schoeman	(substituted off) 62'
Replacements:
HK	16	Ewan Ashman	(substituted on) 56'
PR	17	Rory Sutherland	(substituted on) 62'
PR	18	Will Hurd	(substituted on) 62'
LK	19	Gregor Brown	(substituted on) 67'
N8	20	Matt Fagerson	(substituted on) 36'
SH	21	George Horne	(substituted on) 56'
CE	22	Stafford McDowall	(substituted on) 62'
WG	23	Kyle Rowe	(substituted on) 67'
Coach:
Gregor Townsend

FB	15	Blair Murray
RW	14	Tom Rogers		(substituted off) 10'
OC	13	Max Llewellyn
IC	12	Ben Thomas
LW	11	Ellis Mee
FH	10	Gareth Anscombe		(substituted off) 56'
SH	9	Tomos Williams		(substituted off) 69'
N8	8	Taulupe Faletau
OF	7	Tommy Reffell		(substituted off) 36'	(substituted on) 41'	(substituted off) 46'
BF	6	Jac Morgan (c)
RL	5	Dafydd Jenkins
LL	4	Will Rowlands		(substituted off) 63'
TP	3	WillGriff John	(yellow card) 31'	(substituted off) 46'
HK	2	Elliot Dee		(substituted off) 46'
LP	1	Nicky Smith		(substituted off) 56'
Replacements:
HK	16	Dewi Lake		(substituted on) 46'
PR	17	Gareth Thomas		(substituted on) 56'
PR	18	Keiron Assiratti		(substituted on) 36'	(substituted off) 41'	(substituted on) 46'
LK	19	Teddy Williams		(substituted on) 63'
N8	20	Aaron Wainwright		(substituted on) 46'
SH	21	Rhodri Williams		(substituted on) 69'
FH	22	Jarrod Evans		(substituted on) 56'
CE	23	Joe Roberts		(substituted on) 10'
Coach:
Matt Sherratt

Player of the Match:
Blair Kinghorn (Scotland)

Assistant referees:
Nic Berry (Australia)
Gianluca Gnecchi (Italy)
Television match official:
Eric Gauzins (France)
Foul play review officer:
Tual Trainini (France)

9 March 2025
15:00 GMT (UTC+0)

(1 BP) England	47–24	Italy
Try: Willis 4' c Freeman 27' c Sleightholme (2) 35' c, 53' c M. Smith 44' c T. Curry 47' c Earl 80+1' m Con: F. Smith (6/7) 4', 28', 36', 45', 48', 53'	Report	Try: Capuozzo 14' c Vintcent 31' c Menoncello 71' c Con: P. Garbisi (3/3) 14', 32', 72'; Pen: P. Garbisi (1/2) 38'

Twickenham Stadium, London
Attendance: 81,912
Referee: Andrew Brace (Ireland)

FB	15	Elliot Daly
RW	14	Tommy Freeman
OC	13	Ollie Lawrence	(substituted off) 9'
IC	12	Fraser Dingwall			(substituted off) 74'
LW	11	Ollie Sleightholme
FH	10	Fin Smith
SH	9	Alex Mitchell	(substituted off) 64'
N8	8	Tom Willis	(substituted off) 45'
OF	7	Ben Earl	(substituted off) 51'	(substituted on) 60'
BF	6	Tom Curry	(substituted off) 56'
RL	5	Ollie Chessum
LL	4	Maro Itoje (c)
TP	3	Will Stuart	(substituted off) 60'
HK	2	Jamie George	(substituted off) 54'
LP	1	Ellis Genge	(substituted off) 60'
Replacements:
HK	16	Luke Cowan-Dickie	(substituted on) 54'
PR	17	Fin Baxter	(substituted on) 60'
PR	18	Joe Heyes	(substituted on) 60'
FL	19	Ted Hill	(substituted on) 56'	(substituted off) 60'	(substituted on) 74'
FL	20	Chandler Cunningham-South	(substituted on) 51'
FL	21	Ben Curry	(substituted on) 45'
SH	22	Jack van Poortvliet	(substituted on) 64'
FH	23	Marcus Smith	(substituted on) 9'
Coach:
Steve Borthwick

FB	15	Ange Capuozzo	(substituted off) 70'	(substituted on) 77'
RW	14	Monty Ioane
OC	13	Ignacio Brex
IC	12	Tommaso Menoncello
LW	11	Matt Gallagher		(substituted off) 77'
FH	10	Paolo Garbisi
SH	9	Stephen Varney	(substituted off) 56'
N8	8	Ross Vintcent	(substituted off) 51'
OF	7	Michele Lamaro	(substituted off) 51'
BF	6	Sebastian Negri
RL	5	Federico Ruzza
LL	4	Niccolò Cannone	(substituted off) 69'
TP	3	Marco Riccioni	(substituted off) 48'
HK	2	Giacomo Nicotera	(substituted off) 51'
LP	1	Danilo Fischetti	(substituted off) 60'
Replacements:
HK	16	Gianmarco Lucchesi	(substituted on) 51'
PR	17	Mirco Spagnolo	(substituted on) 60'
PR	18	Simone Ferrari	(substituted on) 48'
LK	19	Riccardo Favretto	(substituted on) 69'
FL	20	Manuel Zuliani	(substituted on) 51'
N8	21	Lorenzo Cannone	(substituted on) 51'
SH	22	Martin Page-Relo	(substituted on) 56'
FH	23	Tommaso Allan	(substituted on) 70'
Coach:
Gonzalo Quesada

Player of the Match:
Ollie Chessum (England)

Assistant referees:
Craig Evans (Wales)
Luc Ramos (France)
Television match official:
Marius Jonker (South Africa)
Foul play review officer:
Mike Adamson (Scotland)

Notes:

- Jamie George earned his 100th test cap for England, becoming the seventh player to reach this milestone (after Jason Leonard, Ben Youngs, Owen Farrell, Dan Cole, Courtney Lawes and Danny Care).

=== Round 5 ===
15 March 2025
15:15 CET (UTC+1)

(1 BP) Italy	17–22	Ireland (1 BP)
Try: Ioane 12' c Varney 63' c Con: Allan (2/2) 13', 65'; Pen: Allan (1/1) 33'	Report	Try: Keenan 24' c Sheehan (3) 40' m, 47' m, 58' m Con: Crowley (1/4) 24'

Stadio Olimpico, Rome
Attendance: 68,981
Referee: Luke Pearce (England)

FB	15	Tommaso Allan		(substituted off) 76'
RW	14	Ange Capuozzo
OC	13	Ignacio Brex (c)
IC	12	Tommaso Menoncello
LW	11	Monty Ioane
FH	10	Paolo Garbisi
SH	9	Martin Page-Relo		(substituted off) 46'
N8	8	Lorenzo Cannone		(substituted off) 30'
OF	7	Manuel Zuliani
BF	6	Sebastian Negri		(substituted off) 30'
RL	5	Federico Ruzza
LL	4	Dino Lamb		(substituted off) 19'
TP	3	Simone Ferrari		(substituted off) 56'
HK	2	Gianmarco Lucchesi
LP	1	Danilo Fischetti		(substituted off) 56'
Replacements:
HK	16	Giacomo Nicotera	(red card) 80'		(substituted on) 69'
PR	17	Mirco Spagnolo		(substituted on) 56'
PR	18	Giosuè Zilocchi		(substituted on) 56'
LK	19	Niccolò Cannone		(substituted on) 19'
FL	20	Michele Lamaro	(yellow card) 39'	(substituted on) 30'
FL	21	Ross Vintcent	(red card) 49'	(substituted on) 30'	(substituted off) 69'
SH	22	Stephen Varney		(substituted on) 46'
FH	23	Leonardo Marin		(substituted on) 76'
Coach:
Gonzalo Quesada

FB	15	Hugo Keenan
RW	14	Mack Hansen
OC	13	Garry Ringrose
IC	12	Robbie Henshaw	(substituted off) 56'
LW	11	James Lowe
FH	10	Jack Crowley	(substituted off) 65'
SH	9	Jamison Gibson-Park	(substituted off) 67'
N8	8	Caelan Doris (c)
OF	7	Josh van der Flier	(substituted off) 52'
BF	6	Jack Conan
RL	5	Tadhg Beirne
LL	4	James Ryan	(substituted off) 47'
TP	3	Finlay Bealham	(substituted off) 47'
HK	2	Dan Sheehan	(substituted off) 71'
LP	1	Andrew Porter	(substituted off) 65'
Replacements:
HK	16	Gus McCarthy	(substituted on) 71'
PR	17	Jack Boyle	(substituted on) 65'
PR	18	Tadhg Furlong	(substituted on) 47'
LK	19	Joe McCarthy	(substituted on) 47'
FL	20	Peter O'Mahony	(substituted on) 52'
SH	21	Conor Murray	(substituted on) 67'
FH	22	Sam Prendergast	(substituted on) 65'
CE	23	Bundee Aki	(substituted on) 56'
Coach:
Simon Easterby

Player of the Match:
Dan Sheehan (Ireland)

Assistant referees:
Angus Gardner (Australia)
Morné Ferreira (South Africa)
Television match official:
Andrew Jackson (England)
Foul play review officer:
Tual Trainini (France)

15 March 2025
16:45 GMT (UTC+0)

Wales	14–68	England (1 BP)
Try: B. Thomas (2) 31' c, 77' c Con: Anscombe (1/1) 32'; Evans (1/1) 77'	Report	Try: Itoje 3' c Roebuck 10' c Freeman 34' c Cunningham-South (2) 38' c, 80+2' c Stuart 40' m Mitchell 55' c Pollock (2) 67' c, 79' c Heyes 70' c Con: F. Smith (5/6) 3', 11', 35', 38', 56'; M. Smith (4/4) 68', 70', 80', 80+3'

Millennium Stadium, Cardiff
Attendance: 74,169
Referee: Nic Berry (Australia)

FB	15	Blair Murray
RW	14	Ellis Mee
OC	13	Max Llewellyn	(substituted off) 57'
IC	12	Ben Thomas
LW	11	Joe Roberts
FH	10	Gareth Anscombe	(substituted off) 48'
SH	9	Tomos Williams	(substituted off) 63'
N8	8	Taulupe Faletau	(substituted off) 53'
OF	7	Jac Morgan (c)
BF	6	Aaron Wainwright
RL	5	Dafydd Jenkins
LL	4	Will Rowlands	(substituted off) 48'
TP	3	WillGriff John	(substituted off) 41'
HK	2	Elliot Dee	(substituted off) 41'
LP	1	Nicky Smith	(substituted off) 53'
Replacements:
HK	16	Dewi Lake	(substituted on) 41'
PR	17	Gareth Thomas	(substituted on) 53'
PR	18	Keiron Assiratti	(substituted on) 41'
LK	19	Teddy Williams	(substituted on) 48'
FL	20	Tommy Reffell	(substituted on) 53'
SH	21	Rhodri Williams	(substituted on) 63'
FH	22	Jarrod Evans	(substituted on) 48'
CE	23	Nick Tompkins	(substituted on) 57'
Coach:
Matt Sherratt

FB	15	Marcus Smith
RW	14	Tom Roebuck
OC	13	Tommy Freeman	(substituted off) 49'
IC	12	Fraser Dingwall
LW	11	Elliot Daly
FH	10	Fin Smith	(substituted off) 56'
SH	9	Alex Mitchell	(substituted off) 68'
N8	8	Ben Earl
OF	7	Ben Curry	(substituted off) 59'
BF	6	Tom Curry
RL	5	Ollie Chessum	(substituted off) 19'
LL	4	Maro Itoje (c)
TP	3	Will Stuart	(substituted off) 47'
HK	2	Luke Cowan-Dickie	(substituted off) 47'
LP	1	Ellis Genge	(substituted off) 63'
Replacements:
HK	16	Jamie George	(substituted on) 47'
PR	17	Fin Baxter	(substituted on) 63'
PR	18	Joe Heyes	(substituted on) 47'
FL	19	Chandler Cunningham-South	(substituted on) 19'
FL	20	Henry Pollock	(substituted on) 49'
N8	21	Tom Willis	(substituted on) 59'
SH	22	Jack van Poortvliet	(substituted on) 68'
FH	23	George Ford	(substituted on) 56'
Coach:
Steve Borthwick

Player of the Match:
Ben Curry (England)

Assistant referees:
Pierre Brousset (France)
Hollie Davidson (Scotland)
Television match official:
Mike Adamson (Scotland)
Foul play review officer:
Eric Gauzins (France)

Notes:

- Will Stuart (England) earned his 50th test cap.
- Henry Pollock (England) made his international debut.
- This was England's highest points total and largest away win against Wales.
- This was Wales' heaviest home defeat, their biggest loss in Six Nations history, and the most points conceded on their home ground.
- Wales received a second consecutive Wooden Spoon, after going winless in back-to-back Six Nations tournaments for the first time.
- Tommy Freeman became the first England player to score a try in every round of a single Six Nations tournament.
- At the age of 20 years and 60 days, Henry Pollock became England's youngest try scorer in Six Nations history.

15 March 2025
21:00 CET (UTC+1)

(1 BP) France	35–16	Scotland
Try: Moefana (2) 18' c, 62' m Bielle-Biarrey 43' c Ramos 57' c Con: Ramos (3/4) 18', 44', 58'; Pen: Ramos (3/3) 4', 26', 39'	Report	Try: Graham 29' c Con: Russell (1/1) 30'; Pen: Russell (3/3) 21', 36', 51'

Stade de France, Saint-Denis
Attendance: 80,000
Referee: Matthew Carley (England)

FB	15	Thomas Ramos
RW	14	Damian Penaud		(substituted off) 23'	(substituted on) 31'
OC	13	Gaël Fickou
IC	12	Yoram Moefana
LW	11	Louis Bielle-Biarrey
FH	10	Romain Ntamack
SH	9	Maxime Lucu		(substituted off) 76'
N8	8	Grégory Alldritt (c)		(substituted off) 47'
OF	7	Paul Boudehent		(substituted off) 47'
BF	6	François Cros
RL	5	Mickaël Guillard		(substituted off) 47'
LL	4	Thibaud Flament		(substituted off) 75'
TP	3	Uini Atonio		(substituted off) 44'
HK	2	Peato Mauvaka	(yellow card) 21'	(substituted off) 47'
LP	1	Jean-Baptiste Gros	(yellow card) 36'	(substituted off) 47'
Replacements:
HK	16	Julien Marchand		(substituted on) 23'	(substituted off) 31'
PR	17	Cyril Baille		(substituted on) 47'
PR	18	Dorian Aldegheri		(substituted on) 44'
LK	19	Hugo Auradou		(substituted on) 75'
LK	20	Emmanuel Meafou		(substituted on) 47'
FL	21	Oscar Jégou		(substituted on) 47'
FL	22	Anthony Jelonch		(substituted on) 47'
SH	23	Nolann Le Garrec		(substituted on) 76'
Coach:
Fabien Galthié

FB	15	Blair Kinghorn
RW	14	Darcy Graham
OC	13	Huw Jones		(substituted off) 67'
IC	12	Tom Jordan
LW	11	Duhan van der Merwe
FH	10	Finn Russell (cc)
SH	9	Ben White		(substituted off) 67'
N8	8	Matt Fagerson
OF	7	Rory Darge (cc)		(substituted off) 67'
BF	6	Jamie Ritchie	(yellow card) 12'
RL	5	Grant Gilchrist		(substituted off) 73'
LL	4	Gregor Brown		(substituted off) 58'
TP	3	Zander Fagerson
HK	2	Dave Cherry		(substituted off) 58'
LP	1	Pierre Schoeman		(substituted off) 67'
Replacements:
HK	16	Ewan Ashman		(substituted on) 58'
PR	17	Rory Sutherland		(substituted on) 67'
PR	18	Will Hurd
LK	19	Ewan Johnson		(substituted on) 73'
LK	20	Marshall Sykes		(substituted on) 58'
FL	21	Ben Muncaster		(substituted on) 67'
SH	22	Jamie Dobie		(substituted on) 67'
CE	23	Stafford McDowall		(substituted on) 67'
Coach:
Gregor Townsend

Player of the Match:
Yoram Moefana (France)

Assistant referees:
Karl Dickson (England)
Eoghan Cross (Ireland)
Television match official:
Marius van der Westhuizen (South Africa)
Foul play review officer:
Ian Tempest (England)

Notes:

- Jonny Gray (Scotland) was originally named among the replacements, but withdrew the day before the game due to a knee injury; he was replaced by Ewan Johnson.
- France set a new record for most tries scored in a Six Nations tournament (30) – breaking the record held by England since 2001.
- Louis Bielle-Biarrey (France) set a new record for most tries scored by one player in a Six Nations tournament (8).
- Thomas Ramos became France's all-time top test points scorer, overtaking the record of 436 held by Frédéric Michalak.
- The 2025 Six Nations Championship concluded with 829 points and 108 tries scored across 15 matches – both new tournament records, exceeding the previous highest figures of 803 points (set in 2000) and 91 tries (set in 2023).

== Player statistics ==
=== Most points ===
As of 15 March 2025

Rank	Name	Team	Points
1	Thomas Ramos	France	71
2	Tommaso Allan	Italy	45
3	Sam Prendergast	Ireland	44
4	Louis Bielle-Biarrey	France	40
5	Marcus Smith	England	30
6	Fin Smith	England	29
7	Finn Russell	Scotland	27
8	Tommy Freeman	England	25
8	Dan Sheehan	Ireland	25
10	Huw Jones	Scotland	20

=== Most tries ===
As of 15 March 2025

Rank	Name	Team	Tries
1	Louis Bielle-Biarrey	France	8
2	Tommy Freeman	England	5
2	Dan Sheehan	Ireland	5
4	Huw Jones	Scotland	4
5	Théo Attissogbé	France	3
5	Jack Conan	Ireland	3
5	Ben White	Scotland	3
5	Ben Thomas	Wales	3
9	Chandler Cunningham-South	England	2
9	Tom Curry	England	2
9	Henry Pollock	England	2
9	Ollie Sleightholme	England	2
9	Grégory Alldritt	France	2
9	Léo Barré	France	2
9	Paul Boudehent	France	2
9	Antoine Dupont	France	2
9	Yoram Moefana	France	2
9	Damian Penaud	France	2
9	Ignacio Brex	Italy	2
9	Ange Capuozzo	Italy	2
9	Tommaso Menoncello	Italy	2
9	Darcy Graham	Scotland	2
9	Blair Kinghorn	Scotland	2
9	Duhan van der Merwe	Scotland	2
9	Tom Jordan	Scotland	2

== Discipline ==
=== Summary ===
As of 15 March 2025

Team	Yellow card	Red card	Total
England	1	0	1
France	3	1	4
Ireland	2	1	3
Italy	3	2	5
Scotland	2	0	2
Wales	4	0	4

=== Yellow cards ===
- (England) Marcus Smith (vs. Ireland)
- (France) François Cros (vs. Ireland)
- (France) Jean-Baptiste Gros (vs. Scotland)
- (France) Peato Mauvaka (vs. Scotland)
- (Ireland) Joe McCarthy (vs. France)
- (Ireland) Calvin Nash (vs. France)
- (Italy) Michele Lamaro (vs. Ireland)
- (Italy) Dino Lamb (vs. Wales)
- (Italy) Marco Riccioni (vs. Wales)
- (Scotland) Jamie Ritchie (vs. France)
- (Scotland) Duhan van der Merwe (vs. Ireland)
- (Wales) Josh Adams (vs. Italy)
- (Wales) WillGriff John (vs. Scotland)
- (Wales) Evan Lloyd (vs. France)
- (Wales) Freddie Thomas (vs. France)

=== Red cards ===
- (France) Romain Ntamack (vs. Wales)
- (Ireland) Garry Ringrose (vs. Wales)
- (Italy) Giacomo Nicotera (vs. Ireland)
- (Italy) Ross Vintcent (vs. Ireland)

=== Citings/bans ===
Player	Match	Citing date	Law breached	Result	Ref
Romain Ntamack	**France** vs. Wales (Round 1 – 31 January 2025)	5 February 2025	9.13 – Dangerous Tackle (Red card)	3-match ban (Note: The suspension is reduced by one match, subject to the player's completion of the World Rugby Coaching Intervention Programme.)	
Garry Ringrose	Wales vs. **Ireland** (Round 3 – 22 February 2025)	25 February 2025	9.13 – Dangerous Tackle (Red card)	3-match ban	
Ross Vintcent	**Italy** vs. Ireland (Round 5 – 15 March 2025)	18 March 2025	9.13 – Dangerous Tackle (Red card)	3-match ban	
Giacomo Nicotera	**Italy** vs. Ireland (Round 5 – 15 March 2025)	18 March 2025	9.20(a) – Dangerous Play in a Ruck (Red card)	4-match ban	
Peato Mauvaka	**France** vs. Scotland (Round 5 – 15 March 2025)	18 March 2025	9.11 – Reckless or Dangerous Play (Citing)	3-match ban	

Note: The cited player's team is listed in bold italics.

== Awards ==
=== Player of the Match awards ===
Awards	Player	Team	Opponent
2	Jamison Gibson-Park	Ireland	England ^{(R1)}
2	Jamison Gibson-Park	Ireland	Wales ^{(R3)}
1	Fin Smith	England	France ^{(R2)}
1	Ollie Chessum	England	Italy ^{(R4)}
1	Ben Curry	England	Wales ^{(R5)}
1	Grégory Alldritt	France	Wales ^{(R1)}
1	Antoine Dupont	France	Italy ^{(R3)}
1	Louis Bielle-Biarrey	France	Ireland ^{(R4)}
1	Yoram Moefana	France	Scotland ^{(R5)}
1	Sam Prendergast	Ireland	Scotland ^{(R2)}
1	Dan Sheehan	Ireland	Italy ^{(R5)}
1	Lorenzo Cannone	Italy	Wales ^{(R2)}
1	Huw Jones	Scotland	Italy ^{(R1)}
1	Duhan van der Merwe	Scotland	England ^{(R3)}
1	Blair Kinghorn	Scotland	Wales ^{(R4)}

=== Player of the Championship ===
Four players were nominated for the 2025 Six Nations Player of the Championship on 17 March 2025. France wing Louis Bielle-Biarrey was announced as the winner on 1 April 2025.

Team	Nominee	Position	Ref
England	Tommy Freeman	Wing	
France	**Louis Bielle-Biarrey**	Wing	
Italy	Tommaso Menoncello	Centre	
Scotland	Blair Kinghorn	Full-back	

- Winner in **bold**

=== Try of the Championship ===
Four tries were nominated for the 2025 Six Nations Try of the Championship on 19 March 2025. Louis Bielle-Biarrey's try against Ireland was announced as the winner on 28 March 2025.

Team	Nominee	Try
France	Léo Barré	vs. Italy
France	**Louis Bielle-Biarrey**	vs. Ireland
Italy	Ross Vintcent	vs. England
Scotland	Huw Jones	vs. England

Winner in bold

=== Team of the Championship ===
The 15 players voted in as the 2025 Six Nations Team of the Championship were announced on 20 March 2025.

Forwards
No.	Team	Player
1	Ireland	Andrew Porter
2	Ireland	Dan Sheehan
3	England	Will Stuart
4	England	Maro Itoje
5	France	Mickaël Guillard
6	England	Tom Curry
7	Wales	Jac Morgan
8	France	Grégory Alldritt

Backs
No.	Team	Player
9	France	Antoine Dupont
10	England	Fin Smith
11	France	Louis Bielle-Biarrey
12	Italy	Tommaso Menoncello
13	Scotland	Huw Jones
14	England	Tommy Freeman
15	Scotland	Blair Kinghorn

=== BKT Rising Player Award ===
On 15 March 2025, Ireland fly-half Sam Prendergast was given the BKT Rising Player Award. The prize recognises "players who have made significant contributions to their team throughout the Guinness Men’s Six Nations, celebrates the individuals who exemplify a team mentality whilst performing at the highest level", and is "reserved for players who have earned their first Guinness Men’s Six Nations cap and acknowledges their emergence on the elite international stage".

== See also ==
- 2025 Women's Six Nations Championship
- 2025 Six Nations Under 20s Championship
