= Jarrod Evans =

Welsh rugby union player (born 1996)

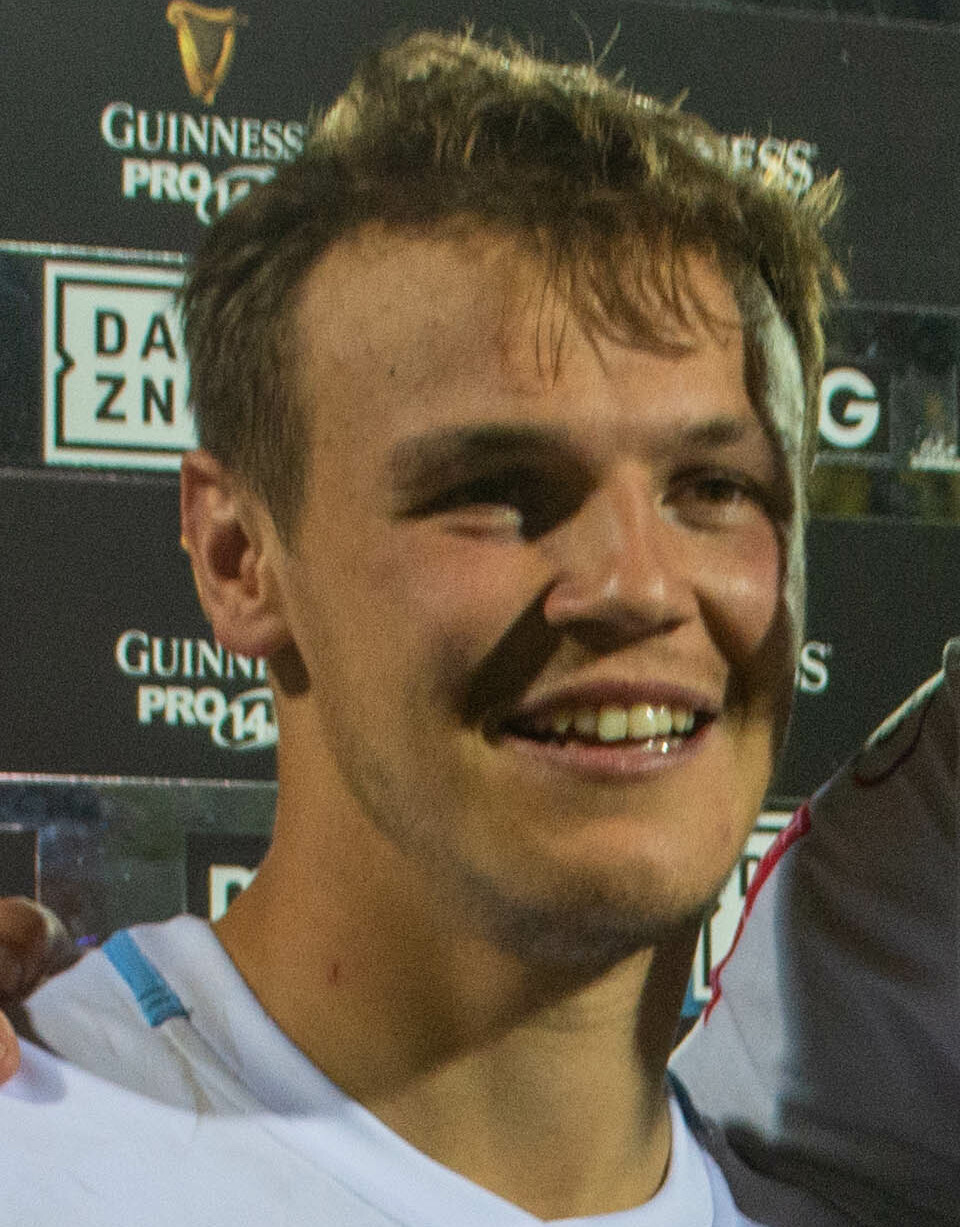
- Evans in 2020
- Born: Jarrod Evans; 25 July 1996 (age 30) Pontypridd, Wales
- Height: 178 cm (5 ft 10 in)
- Weight: 86 kg (13 st 8 lb; 190 lb)
- School: Pontypridd High School

Rugby union career
- Position: Fly Half
- Current team: Cardiff Rugby
Youth career
- Pontyclun RFC
Senior career
Years	Team	Apps	(Points)
2013–2015	Pontypridd RFC	15	(120)
2015–2023	Cardiff Rugby	130	(750)
2023–2026	Harlequins	50	(118)
2026-	Cardiff Rugby	0	(0)
- Correct as of 15 July 2026
International career
Years	Team	Apps	(Points)
2015–2016	Wales U20	12	(61)
2018–	Wales	19	(29)
- Correct as of 15 July 2026

Jarrod Evans (born 25 July 1996) is a Welsh rugby union player who plays as a fly-half for Cardiff Rugby. He has also represented Wales and Wales U20s.

== Club career ==
Evans played youth rugby for Pontyclun RFC, and made his debut for Pontypridd RFC at age 17.

Evans made his debut for Cardiff in 2015, having previously played for their academy.

In 2018, Evans won the 2017–18 European Rugby Challenge Cup with Cardiff, scoring 13 points in the final against Gloucester.

On 29 January 2022, Evans kicked a last minute long range penalty against Leinster, propelling Cardiff to their first win over the Irish team since 2011.

In April 2023, Evans signed for Harlequins alongside Wales prop and Cardiff compatriot Dillon Lewis ahead of the following season. On 28 October 2023, Evans kicked a last minute penalty against Bristol in the absence of first choice fly half Marcus Smith. Harlequins won the game 23–21 at Ashton Gate.

On July 8, 2026, Cardiff Rugby announced Evans would return to the Arms Park on a long-term deal after a 3 year absence from the club.

== International career ==
In October 2018, Evans was called up to the senior Wales squad for the Autumn internationals.

Evans made his debut for Wales coming off the bench for the final few minutes against Scotland in 2018 for the opening game of their November series.

Having not reached the required 25 caps for Wales, Evans' move to Harlequins has made him ineligible to play for Wales for the foreseeable future. Evans has commented on this since joining Harlequins, stating, "I came [to Harlequins] knowing the 25-cap rule was in place. [But] there might be something in the fact that I wasn't offered a contract, so there might be a loophole." He also mentioned, "There's nothing in my contract with Harlequins to say that I can't play for Wales, it's just down to whether they pick me. If it was an option, I'd love to play for Wales again."

In February 2025, he was called up to the Wales senior training squad mid-way through the 2025 Six Nations by interim head coach Matt Sherratt. Having last played for Wales during the 2021 Summer Tests against Argentina, he returned to the matchday squad to face Ireland.

Evans was selected for the 2025 end-of-year rugby union internationals. He came on as a substitute in the second-half against Argentina, and kicked a conversion for Blair Murray's try. Evans came off the bench against Japan, and kicked the winning penalty, to end Wales' 10-match losing home streak.

Evans was named in the squad for the 2026 Six Nations by Steve Tandy.

== Honours ==
=== Cardiff ===
- EPCR Challenge Cup: 2018

=== Wales ===
- Six Nations Championship: 2019, 2021
- Grand Slam: 2019
- Triple Crown: 2019, 2021
- Doddie Weir Cup: 2019, 2021
