= Cadan Murley =

English rugby union player (born 1999)

- Born: Cadan Murley; 31 July 1999 (age 27) Frimley, England
- Height: 1.81 m (5 ft 11 in)
- Weight: 94 kg (14 st 11 lb; 207 lb)
- School: Bishop Wordsworth's School

Rugby union career
- Position: Wing
- Current team: Harlequins
Senior career
Years	Team	Apps	(Points)
2017–	Harlequins	157	(390)
- Correct as of 15 November 2026
International career
Years	Team	Apps	(Points)
2017	England U18	8	(30)
2018–2019	England U20	2	(5)
2024–	England A	4	(35)
2025–	England	8	(25)
- Correct as of 15 November 2026

Cadan Murley (born 31 July 1999) is an English professional rugby union player who plays as a wing for Premiership Rugby club Harlequins and the England national team.

== Rugby career ==
=== Club ===
In January 2018 Murley made his club debut for Harlequins against Scarlets in the Anglo-Welsh Cup. He started in the Premiership final against Exeter Chiefs on 26 June 2021 as Harlequins won the game 40-38 in the highest scoring Premiership final ever.

In April 2024, Murley scored in the Champions Cup as Harlequins won their first ever knockout game in the competition defeating Glasgow Warriors 28-24 at home in the Round of 16.

In October 2024, Murley was named captain for Harlequins Premiership fixture against Exeter Chiefs in the absence of club captain Alex Dombrandt who had been called up to the England squad. He went on to score the final try in the fixture. In December 2024, he scored a hat-trick in their opening home fixture of the 2024–25 Champions Cup in a 56—19 win over the Stormers. In January 2025, he scored another try in 24–7 win over Glasgow Warriors to help secure a place in the knockout stages of the 2024–25 Champions Cup. In May 2025, he scored a hat-trick against Gloucester during a 38–19 victory in the Big Summer Kick Off fixture.

=== International ===
In 2017 Murley represented the England under-18 team scoring tries in games against Ireland and France. He scored a try in a defeat against Ireland during the opening round of the 2019 Six Nations Under 20s Championship. An elbow injury sustained in a league match against Northampton Saints ruled him out of selection for the 2019 World Rugby Under 20 Championship.

In January 2023 he was called up by Steve Borthwick to the senior England squad for the 2023 Six Nations Championship however he did not make his international debut during the tournament. In February 2024, he was named in the England A side by coaches Steve Borthwick and George Skivington alongside Harlequins teammates Fin Baxter and Sam Riley to face Portugal. Murley scored a hat-trick of tries in this fixture.

In November 2024, he scored two tries for England A against Australia A. Off the back of this performance, and injuries to Immanuel Feyi-Waboso and Elliot Daly, he was called into the senior training squad for the 2024 Autumn Nations Series fixture against Japan.

Although uncapped in that series, he received a call-up to the squad once more for the 2025 Six Nations. In January 2025, he was named in the starting lineup to make his debut in the opening round of the tournament against Ireland. He scored a try and assisted another as England were eventually defeated 27–22. Following the game, he dropped out the senior training squad with a foot injury and was replaced by Alex Lozowski. In July 2025, he returned to the senior setup scoring a try off the bench in a 35–12 victory over Argentina in the 2025 summer series. In the final game of the summer tour, he scored another try during a 40–5 victory over the United States.

=== List of international tries ===
As of 11 February 2025

Try	Opposing team	Location	Venue	Competition	Date	Result	Score
1	Ireland	Dublin, Ireland	Aviva Stadium	2025 Six Nations	1 February 2025	Loss	27 – 22
2	Japan	London, England	Twickenham Stadium	2026 Nations Championship	14 November 2026	Win	78–15
