= Louis Bielle-Biarrey =

France international rugby union player

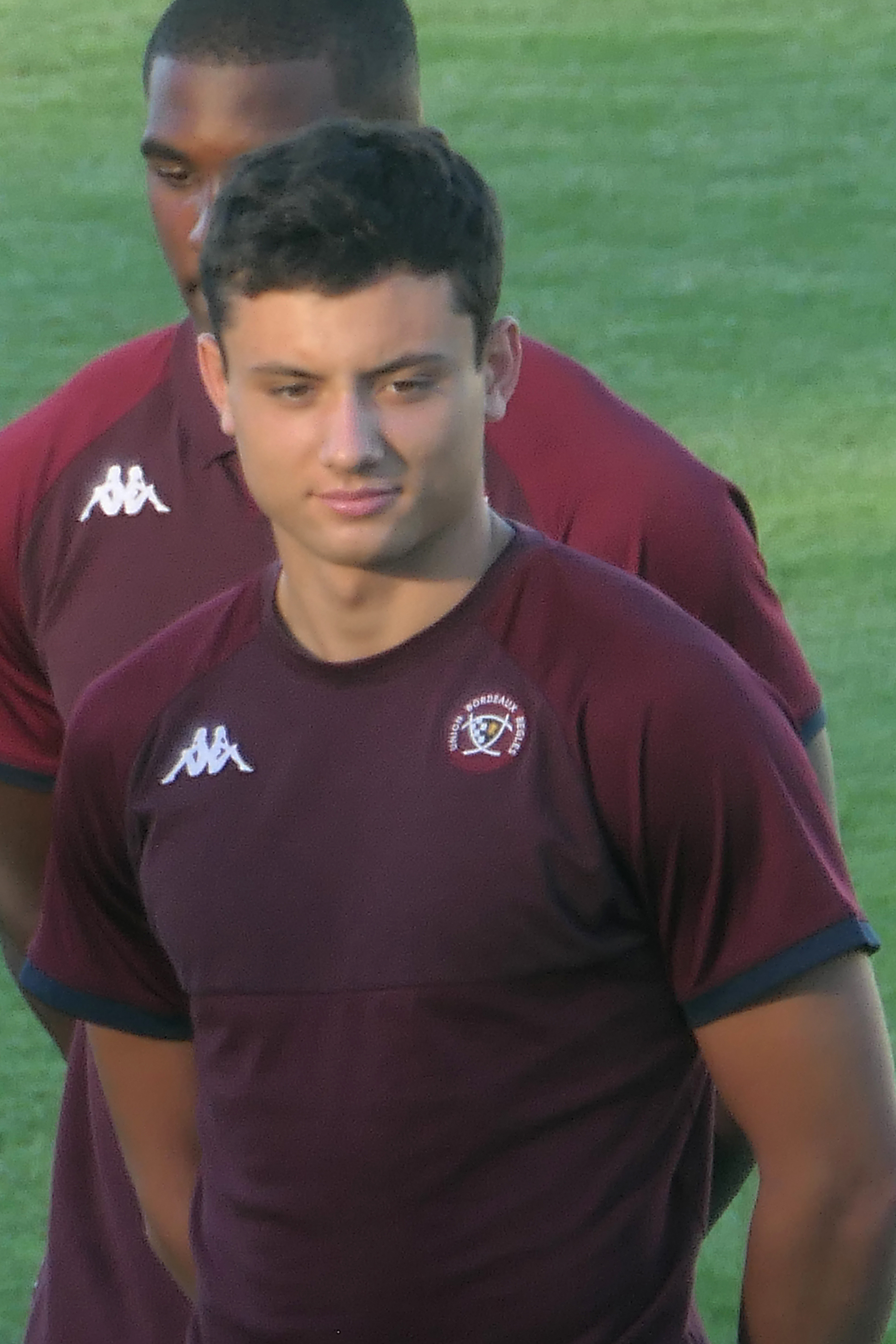
- Bielle-Biarrey with Bordeaux in 2022
- Born: Louis Bielle-Biarrey; 19 June 2003 (age 23) La Tronche, France
- Height: 1.84 m (6 ft 1/2 in)
- Weight: 84 kg (13 st 3 lb; 185 lb)

Rugby union career
- Position(s): Wing, Fullback
- Current team: Bordeaux Bègles
Youth career
- 2008–2016: RC Seyssins
- 2016–2021: Grenoble
Senior career
Years	Team	Apps	(Points)
2021–	Bordeaux Bègles	101	(347)
- Correct as of 18 November 2026
International career
Years	Team	Apps	(Points)
2021–2023	France U20	10	(32)
2023–	France	30	(155)
- Correct as of 21 November 2026

Louis Bielle-Biarrey (born 19 June 2003) is a French professional rugby union wing who currently plays for Bordeaux Bègles in the Top 14 and France national team. He is Bordeaux's top try scorer after scoring his 47th try in the 2025–26 Top 14 season games against Lyon OU.

== Early life ==
Louis Bielle-Biarrey was born in La Tronche in the department of Isère, to a French father from Toulouse and a Reunionese mother. He also has a Chinese grandfather. He started rugby at the age of five in the city of Seyssins, near Grenoble, in 2008, before continuing and finishing his training at FC Grenoble, at the age of thirteen, from 2016 to 2021. In 2021, he began playing for Bordeaux Bègles.

== Club career ==
In January 2022, he made his Champions Cup debut at 18 years old for Bordeaux Bègles scoring a hat-trick against Scarlets in a 45–10 victory.

In May 2025, he scored two tries during a 35–18 victory over reigning champions Toulouse in the Champions Cup semi-final to help his side reach their first ever European final.

== International career ==
In August 2023, Bielle-Biarrey made his debut for France during a 25–21 defeat to Scotland during the 2023 Rugby World Cup warm-up matches.

In January 2025, he scored two tries against Wales in the opening fixture of the 2025 Six Nations. The following week he scored another two tries in a 26–25 defeat to England. Having scored another try in the victory over Italy, he then scored twice in Dublin against Ireland, setting a record for the most tries scored by a French player in a Six Nations campaign (7 tries). By scoring on the final day of competition against Scotland, he became the top single year try-scorer in the history of the Six Nations Tournament with eight tries. He also won the final with France and was voted the tournament's best player for the 2025 edition.

He was also selected for the French squad to feature in the 2026 Six Nations. In February 2026, he scored two tries in the opening fixture of the tournament during a 36–14 victory against Ireland. In March 2026, in the final fixture of the tournament, he scored four tries during a 48–46 victory against England as France won the title, breaking his own record set the previous year with nine tries in the tournament, and having scored a try in every match of both years’ events. Following the end of the campaign, he won player of the tournament for a second consecutive year.

== Career statistics ==
=== List of international tries ===
International tries
No.	Date	Venue	Opponent	Score	Result	Competition
1	5 August 2023	Murrayfield Stadium, Edinburgh, Scotland	Scotland	3–12	25–21	2023 Rugby World Cup warm-up matches
2	14 September 2023	Stade Pierre-Mauroy, Lille, France	Uruguay	25–12	27–12	2023 Rugby World Cup
3	21 September 2023	Stade Vélodrome, Marseille, France	Namibia	52–0	96–0	2023 Rugby World Cup
4	21 September 2023	Stade Vélodrome, Marseille, France	Namibia	73–0	96–0	2023 Rugby World Cup
5	6 October 2023	Parc Olympique Lyonnais, Décines-Charpieu, France	Italy	15–0	60–7	2023 Rugby World Cup
6	10 February 2024	Murrayfield Stadium, Edinburgh, Scotland	Scotland	16–15	16–20	2024 Six Nations
7	9 November 2024	Stade de France, Saint-Denis, France	Japan	5–0	52–12	2024 end-of-year rugby union internationals
8	9 November 2024	Stade de France, Saint-Denis, France	Japan	24–0	52–12	2024 end-of-year rugby union internationals
9	16 November 2024	Stade de France, Saint-Denis, France	New Zealand	22–17	30–29	2024 end-of-year rugby union internationals
10	22 November 2024	Stade de France, Saint-Denis, France	Argentina	35–16	37–23	2024 end-of-year rugby union internationals
11	31 January 2025	Stade de France, Saint-Denis, France	Wales	12–0	43–0	2025 Six Nations
12	31 January 2025	Stade de France, Saint-Denis, France	Wales	26–0	43–0	2025 Six Nations
13	8 February 2025	Twickenham Stadium, London, England	England	0–5	26–25	2025 Six Nations
14	8 February 2025	Twickenham Stadium, London, England	England	19–23	26–25	2025 Six Nations
15	23 February 2025	Stadio Olimpico, Rome, Italy	Italy	17–47	24–73	2025 Six Nations
16	8 March 2025	Aviva Stadium, Dublin, Ireland	Ireland	0–5	27–42	2025 Six Nations
17	8 March 2025	Aviva Stadium, Dublin, Ireland	Ireland	13–20	27–42	2025 Six Nations
18	15 March 2025	Stade de France, Saint-Denis, France	Scotland	21–13	35–16	2025 Six Nations
19	22 November 2025	Stade de France, Saint-Denis, France	Australia	17–12	48–33	2025 end-of-year rugby union internationals
20	22 November 2025	Stade de France, Saint-Denis, France	Australia	39–26	48–33	2025 end-of-year rugby union internationals
21	5 February 2026	Stade de France, Saint-Denis, France	Ireland	5–0	36–14	2026 Six Nations
22	5 February 2026	Stade de France, Saint-Denis, France	Ireland	27–0	36–14	2026 Six Nations
23	15 February 2026	Millennium Stadium, Cardiff, Wales	Wales	0–12	12–54	2026 Six Nations
24	22 February 2026	Stade Pierre-Mauroy, Villeneuve-d'Ascq, France	Italy	5–0	33–8	2026 Six Nations
25	7 March 2026	Murrayfield Stadium, Edinburgh, Scotland	Scotland	7–5	50–40	2026 Six Nations
26	14 March 2026	Stade de France, Saint-Denis, France	England	5–0	48–46	2026 Six Nations
27	14 March 2026	Stade de France, Saint-Denis, France	England	12–5	48–46	2026 Six Nations
28	14 March 2026	Stade de France, Saint-Denis, France	England	29–27	48–46	2026 Six Nations
29	14 March 2026	Stade de France, Saint-Denis, France	England	43–39	48–46	2026 Six Nations
30	13 November 2026	Stade de France, Saint-Denis, France	South Africa	19-7	21-19	2026 Nations Championship
31	21 November 2026	Stade de France, Saint-Denis, France	Argentina	45–17	45–17	2026 Nations Championship

== Honours ==
France

- 2x Six Nations Championships: 2025, 2026

Bordeaux Bègles

- 2× European Rugby Champions Cup: 2025, 2026

Individual

- 2× Six Nations Championship Player of the Championship: 2025, 2026
