= WillGriff John =

Wales international rugby union footballer

- Born: WillGriff John; 4 December 1992 (age 33) Plymouth, England
- Height: 1.87 m (6 ft 2 in)
- Weight: 127 kg (280 lb; 20 st 0 lb)

Rugby union career
- Position: Tighthead Prop
- Current team: Sale Sharks
Youth career
- 2009-2010: Cardiff Blues
Senior career
| Years | Team | Apps | (Points) |
| 2010–2013 | Cardiff Blues | 19 | (0) |
| 2013–2014 | Northland | 18 | (5) |
| 2014–2017 | Doncaster Knights | 57 | (20) |
| 2017–2021 | Sale Sharks | 94 | (0) |
| 2021–2023 | Scarlets | 18 | (0) |
| 2023 | Racing 92 | 1 | (0) |
| 2023–2024 | US Montauban | 4 | (0) |
| 2024- | Sale Sharks | 12 | (0) |
International career
| Years | Team | Apps | (Points) |
| 2010–2012 | Wales U20 | 14 | (5) |
| 2021- | Wales | 5 | (0) |

WillGriff John (born 4 December 1992) is a Welsh rugby union player who currently plays for Sale Sharks in Premiership Rugby. A tight head prop, John has previously played for Cardiff Blues, Northland, Doncaster Knights, Sale Sharks, and the Scarlets. He won two caps for Wales in 2021.

== Club career ==
Born in Plymouth, England, and raised in the Rhondda in Wales, John began his playing career at Pontypridd and represented Wales at youth levels. He also played for Cardiff Blues and was part of the squad that won the European Challenge Cup in 2010. In 2013 he moved to New Zealand and played for two seasons in the ITM Cup with the province of Northland.

John then returned to the UK and joined Doncaster in the Championship in 2014. On 3 May 2017 John was signed by Sale Sharks in the English Premiership.

John departed Sale to join Scarlets for the 2021–22 season.

At the end of the 2022–23 season, John was released by the Scarlets, and subsequently joined Racing 92 on a short-term contract. Following his departure from Racing John joined Pro D2 club US Montauban as a medical joker in November 2023. He rejoined his former club Sale Sharks on a short-term contract as injury cover for Nick Schonert in April 2024 and remained at the club for the 2024–2025 season.

== International career ==
On 15 January 2020, John was named in the Wales squad for the 2020 Six Nations Championship. He was named in the starting side against Scotland, but the match was cancelled prior to kickoff due to COVID-19.

On 6 November 2021, John made his Wales debut coming off the bench against South Africa. John made his first start against Fiji later in the month.

On 13 January 2025 John was named in the Wales squad for the 2025 Six Nations Championship.
