= Mickaël Guillard =

France international rugby union player (born 2000)

- Full name: Mickaël Guillard
- Born: 10 December 2000 (age 25) Trappes, France
- Height: 1.97 m (6 ft 6 in)
- Weight: 122 kg (269 lb; 19 st 3 lb)

Rugby union career
- Position(s): Flanker, Lock
- Current team: Lyon
Youth career
- 2006–2009: RC Maurepas Élancourt
- 2009–2017: St-Quentin Yvelines R.
- 2017–2020: Massy
Senior career
Years	Team	Apps	(Points)
2019–2020	Massy	14	(0)
2020–	Lyon	95	(25)
- Correct as of 21 March 2025
International career
Years	Team	Apps	(Points)
2020	France U20	4	(0)
2024–	France	18	(10)
- Correct as of 14 March 2026

Mickaël Guillard (born 10 December 2000) is a French professional rugby union player who plays as a flanker or a lock for Top 14 club Lyon.

== Biography ==
During the 2023-24 season, he became a regular starter and an important player for Lyon.

In June 2024, he made his international debut for France.

== Career statistics ==
=== List of international tries ===
No.	Date	Venue	Opponent	Score	Result	Competition
1	23 February 2025	Stadio Olimpico, Rome, Italy	Italy	7–5	24–73	2025 Six Nations
2	5 July 2025	Forsyth Barr Stadium, Dunedin, New Zealand	New Zealand	0–8	31–27	2025 New Zealand test series

== Honours ==
France

- 2x Six Nations Championship: 2025, 2026
