= Tom Jordan (rugby union) =

Scotland international rugby union player

- Born: Tom Jordan; 18 September 1998 (age 28) Auckland, New Zealand
- Height: 1.89 m (6 ft 2 in)
- Weight: 95 kg (209 lb; 14 st 13 lb)

Rugby union career
- Position: Fly-half / Centre / Full-back
- Current team: Bristol Bears
Amateur team(s)
| Years | Team | Apps | (Points) |
- Hamilton Old Boys
Senior career
| Years | Team | Apps | (Points) |
| 2019-2022 | Ayrshire Bulls | 37 | (223) |
| 2022–2025 | Glasgow Warriors | 55 | (104) |
| 2025– | Bristol Bears | 24 | (105) |
- Correct as of 11 October 2025
International career
| Years | Team | Apps | (Points) |
| 2024– | Scotland | 23 | (28) |
- Correct as of 18 November 2026

Tom Jordan (born 18 September 1998) is a New Zealand-born rugby union player. He plays for Prem Rugby side Bristol Bears and the Scotland national team. He represents Scotland having qualified on residency grounds. Jordan can play at fly-half or centre. He previously played for Ayrshire Bulls.

== Rugby Union career ==
=== Amateur career ===
Jordan represented Orewa College and played for Hamilton Old Boys in New Zealand.

=== Professional career ===
Jordan was signed by the Ayrshire Bulls to play in the Super 6 league in 2019. He was player of the match in the 2021 Super 6 final contributing 16 points to Ayrshire Bulls title victory over the Southern Knights.

Having impressed in the Super 6, he was signed by Glasgow Warriors in November 2021. He played in the pre-season friendly against his old team, the Ayrshire Bulls, in Inverness on 2 September 2022, playing at Centre.

He made his competitive debut in the United Rugby Championship playing against Benetton Rugby in Italy on 16 September 2022 at fly-half. He has the Glasgow Warrior No. 343.

He made his competitive home debut at Scotstoun Stadium in Glasgow's 52 - 24 win over Cardiff Rugby.

==== Bristol Bears ====
On 18 November 2024, Jordan would leave Glasgow as he agrees a deal to join English side Bristol Bears in the Premiership Rugby from the 2025–26 season. In September 2025, he made his Prem Rugby debut, starting at full back but playing most of the game at fly half after an injury to first choice AJ MacGinty, he kicked four conversions and three penalties in a 42–24 victory over Leicester Tigers. In October 2025, he received a 20 minute red card for a high tackle on Ross Vintcent in an 18–14 victory against Exeter Chiefs.

=== International career ===
Jordan was named in the Scotland squad for the 2024 Autumn Nations Series. He made his international debut on 2 November 2024 as a replacement against Fiji.
