= Jean-Baptiste Gros =

France rugby player (born 1999)

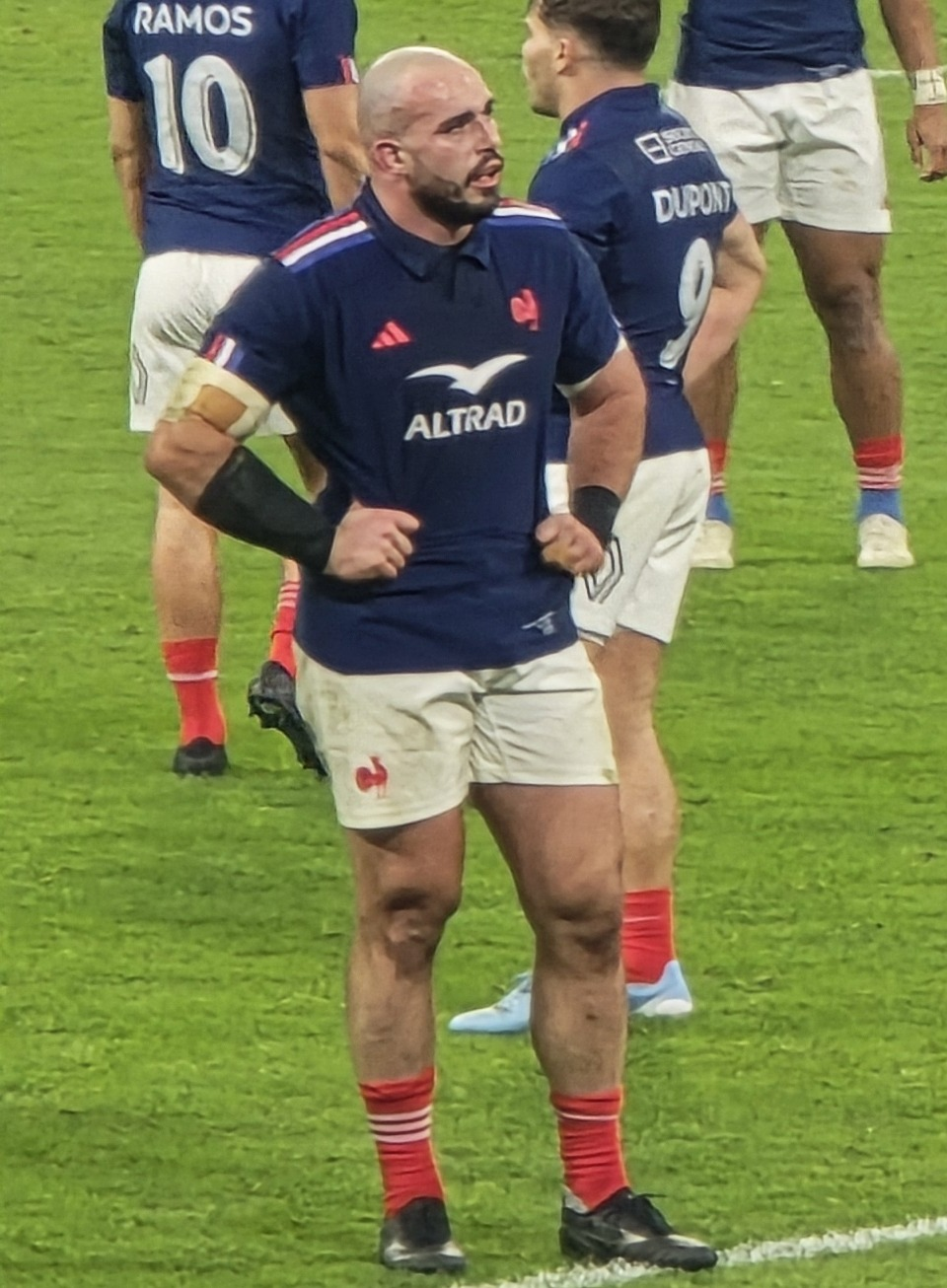
- Gris with France in 2024
- Born: Jean-Baptiste Gros; 29 May 1999 (age 27) Arles, France
- Height: 1.86 m (6 ft 1 in)
- Weight: 117 kg (18 st 6 lb; 258 lb)

Rugby union career
- Position: Prop
- Current team: Toulon
Senior career
| Years | Team | Apps | (Points) |
| 2017– | Toulon | 135 | (20) |
- Correct as of 24 October 2026
International career
| Years | Team | Apps | (Points) |
| 2018–2019 | France U20 | 14 | (15) |
| 2020– | France | 47 | (10) |
- Correct as of 13 November 2026

Jean-Baptiste Gros (born 29 May 1999) is a French professional rugby union player. His position is prop and he currently plays for Toulon in the Top 14.

== International career ==
=== International tries ===
International tries
| No. | Date | Venue | Opponent | Score | Result | Competition |
|---|---|---|---|---|---|---|
| 1 | 9 November 2024 | Stade de France, Saint-Denis, France | Japan | 36–0 | 52–12 | 2024 Autumn internationals |

== Honours ==
=== International ===
France (U20)

- World Rugby Under 20 Championship winners (2): 2018, 2019

France

- Six Nations Championship (3): 2022, 2025, 2026
- Grand Slam: 2022
