= Ross Vintcent =

Italy international rugby union player

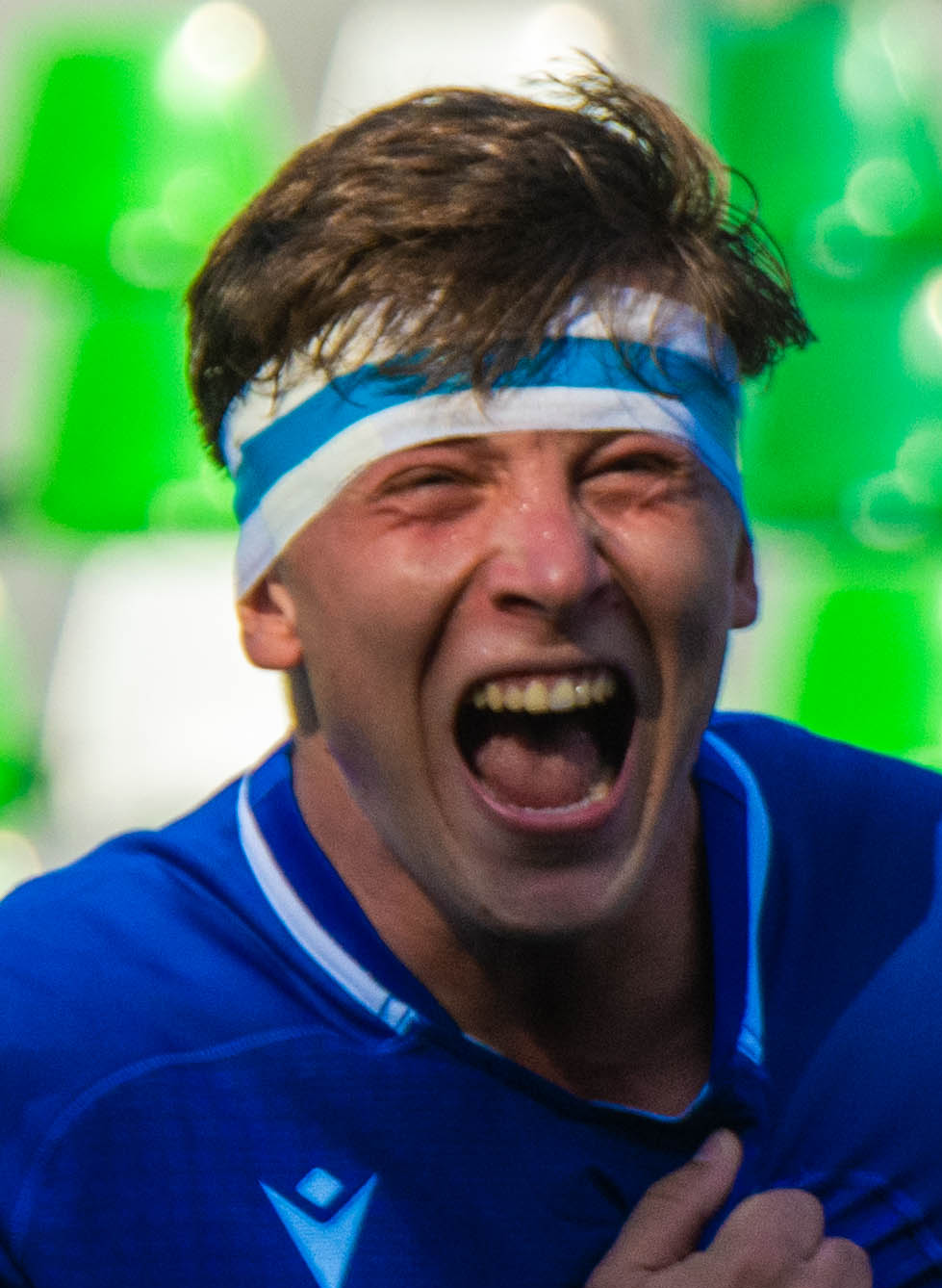
- Vintcent in 2022
- Born: Ross Michael Alwyn Vintcent; 5 June 2002 (age 24) Johannesburg, South Africa
- Height: 1.85 m (6 ft 1 in)
- Weight: 98 kg (15.4 st; 216 lb)
- School: Bishops Diocesan College
- University: University of Exeter

Rugby union career
- Position: Flanker / Number 8
- Current team: Exeter Chiefs
Youth career
- 2020−2022: F.I.R. Academy
Amateur team(s)
Years	Team	Apps	(Points)
2022−2023	Exeter University		
Senior career
Years	Team	Apps	(Points)
2020–2022	F.I.R. Academy	-	(-)
2022	→ Zebre Parma	3	(0)
2022−	Exeter Chiefs	56	(95)
- Correct as of 17 Sep 2026
International career
Years	Team	Apps	(Points)
2021–2022	Italy U20	12	(10)
2024–	Italy	22	(10)
- Correct as of 17 Sep 2026

Ross Michael Alwyn Vintcent (born 5 June 2002) is a South African-born Italian rugby union player who plays as a flanker for Prem Rugby side Exeter Chiefs.

== Club career ==
Vintcent was named in the F.I.R. Academy for the 2020–2021 and 2021–22 seasons, having been allocated by the Italian Rugby Union. In May 2022 he was added at list of Permit player of Zebre Parma. He made his debut in the re-arranged Round 12 of the 2021–22 United Rugby Championship against Cardiff.

In September 2022, he began studying at the University of Exeter and became involved with Exeter Chiefs through the Exeter University Rugby Club. He went on to make his debut that month in the Premiership Rugby Cup in an away fixture against Bristol Bears.

In January 2025, he scored a solo wonder try from his own 10-metre line in a defeat against Ulster in the Champions Cup.

In September 2025, he score two tries, with his side having been 33–7 down at half time, to draw 33–33 against Northampton Saints in the Chiefs opening Prem fixture of the 2025–26 season.

== International career ==
Despite being born in South Africa, Vintcent qualifies to play for Italy through his maternal grandfather. In 2021 and 2022, he was named in Italy U20s squad for annual Six Nations Under 20s Championship. On 10 January 2023, he was named in Italy A squad for a uncapped test against Romania A.

On 16 January 2024, he was named in Italy squad for 2024 Six Nations Championship. He made his debut against Ireland.

During the 2025 Six Nations, he scored his first try in a Six Nations fixture finishing a break setup by Ange Capuozzo in a 47–24 defeat to England. The following week received a 20-minute red card after a high challenge on Robbie Henshaw during a 22–17 defeat to Ireland in the final round of the tournament.

== Personal life ==
Vintcent is currently studying for an Economics degree at the University of Exeter. To help supplement his income, he had a job delivering Domino's Pizzas alongside his studies and playing rugby in Exeter.
