= Yoram Moefana =

French rugby union player (born 2000)

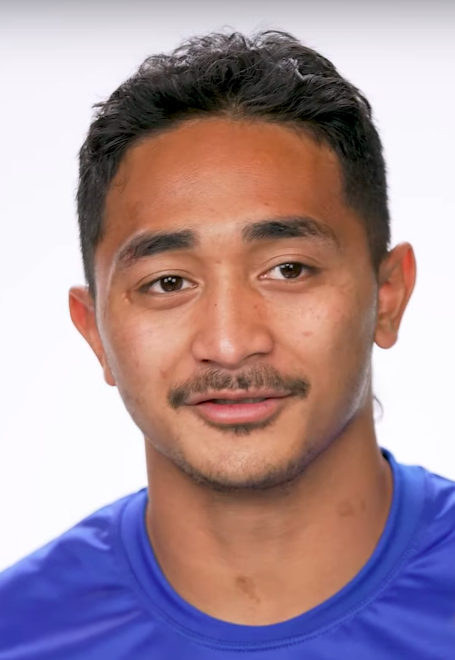
- Moefana representing France during the Six Nations Championship
- Full name: Yoram Falatea Mulifenua Pio Moefana
- Born: 18 July 2000 (age 26) Nouméa, New Caledonia
- Height: 1.82 m (6 ft 0 in)
- Weight: 97 kg (214 lb; 15 st 4 lb)

Rugby union career
- Position(s): Centre, Wing
- Current team: Bordeaux Bègles
Youth career
- 2009–2013: RC Avamafoa Rugby
- 2013: Limoges
- 2013–2018: Colomiers
Senior career
Years	Team	Apps	(Points)
2018–2019	Colomiers	6	(0)
2019–	Bordeaux Bègles	130	(80)
- Correct as of 8 November 2026
International career
Years	Team	Apps	(Points)
2019–2020	France U20	5	(10)
2020–	France	43	(30)
- Correct as of 8 November 2026

Yoram Falatea Mulifenua Pio Moefana (born 18 July 2000) is a French professional rugby union player who plays as a centre for Top 14 club Bordeaux Bègles and the France national team. Born into a Futunan family, he started his professional career in 2018.

== Early life ==
Originally from Futuna, Yoram Moefana was born into a rugby household with his uncles Tapu Falatea and Sipili Falatea being professional rugby players. He arrived in Metropolitan France at the age of 13 with his uncle. After having started rugby in Limoges, he joined the Colomiers academy.

== Professional career ==
=== Bordeaux Bègles ===
After having made his debut in Pro D2 with Colomiers during the 2018–19 season, Moefana was recruited by Top 14 club Bordeaux Bègles in the summer of 2019.

=== France ===
Yoram Moefana was called by Fabien Galthié to the French national team for the first time in 2020, for the Autumn Nations Cup.

In 2022, he won the 2022 Six Nations Championship and the Grand Slam, scoring a try against Scotland at Murrayfield whereas he was injured for the last game against England at the Stade de France.

== Career statistics ==
=== List of international tries ===
International tries
No.	Date	Venue	Opponent	Score	Result	Competition
1	26 February 2022	Murrayfield Stadium, Edinburgh, Scotland	Scotland	3–12	17–36	2022 Six Nations
2	2 July 2022	Toyota Stadium, Toyota, Japan	Japan	16–35	23–42	2022 Japan test series
3	6 October 2023	Parc Olympique Lyonnais, Décines-Charpieu, France	Italy	50–0	60–7	2023 Rugby World Cup
4	6 October 2023	Parc Olympique Lyonnais, Décines-Charpieu, France	Italy	57–7	60–7	2023 Rugby World Cup
5	15 March 2025	Stade de France, Saint-Denis, France	Scotland	8–0	35–16	2025 Six Nations
6	15 March 2025	Stade de France, Saint-Denis, France	Scotland	35–16	35–16	2025 Six Nations

== Honours ==
France

- 3x Six Nations Championship: 2022, 2025, 2026
- 1× Grand Slam: 2022

Bordeaux Bègles

- 2× European Rugby Champions Cup: 2025, 2026
