= Paul Boudehent =

French rugby union player

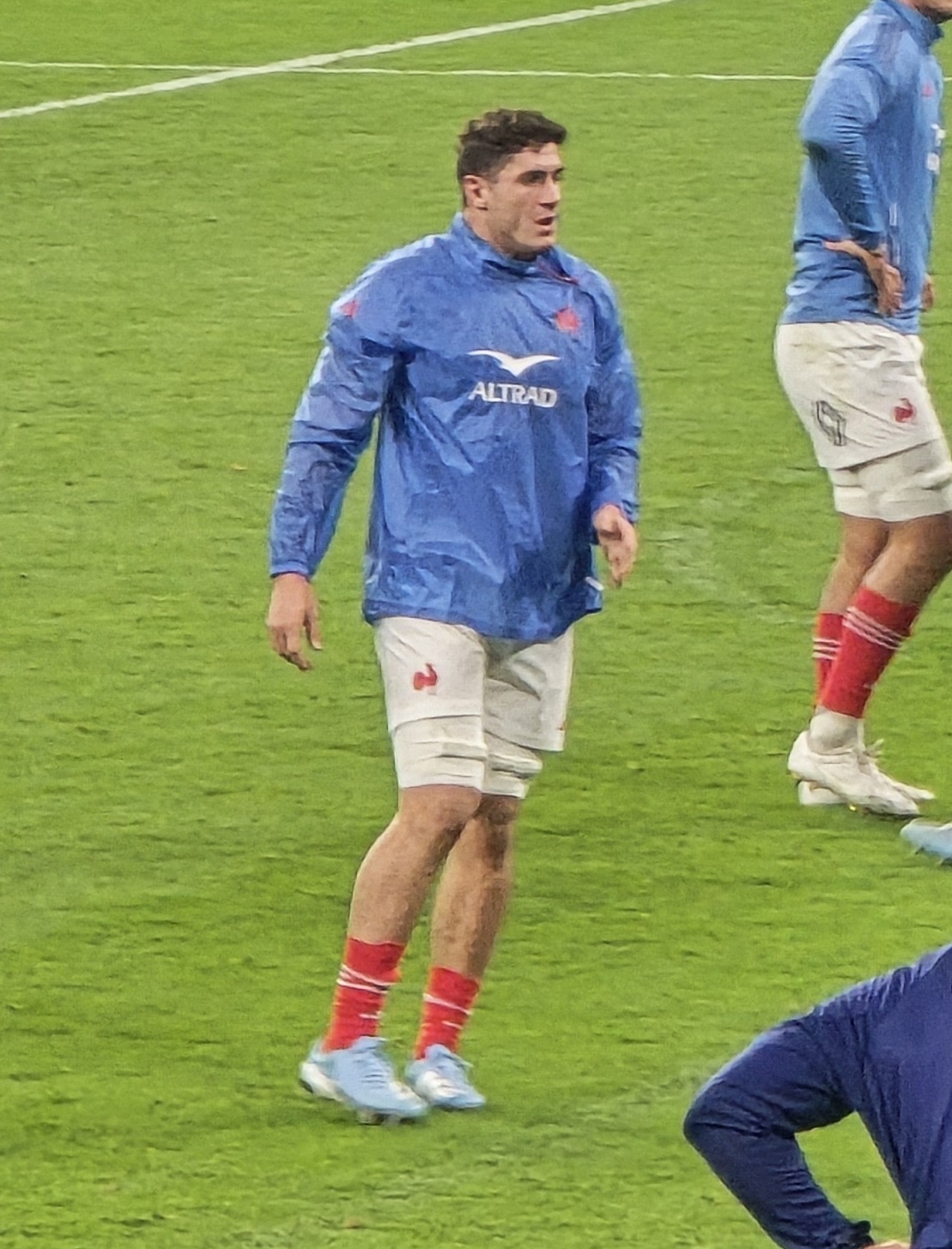
- Boudehent with France in 2024
- Born: 21 November 1999 (age 26) Angers, France
- Height: 1.92 m (6 ft 4 in)
- Weight: 112 kg (247 lb; 17 st 9 lb)
- Notable relative: Pierre Boudehent (brother)

Rugby union career
- Position(s): Flanker, Number 8
- Current team: La Rochelle
Senior career
Years	Team	Apps	(Points)
2018–	La Rochelle	100	(55)
- Correct as of 14 September 2025
International career
Years	Team	Apps	(Points)
2019	France U20	2	(0)
2023–	France	21	(25)
- Correct as of 15 November 2025

Paul Boudehent (born 21 November 1999) is a French professional rugby union player who plays as a flanker for Top 14 club La Rochelle, and for France.

== Early life ==
Paul Boudehent started rugby in Angers, then moved to Nantes in 2014 and finally joined the La Rochelle youth system in 2017.

== Professional career ==
On 17 January 2023, Boudehent was first called by Fabien Galthié to the France national team for the 2023 Six Nations Championship.

=== International tries ===
International tries
No.	Date	Venue	Opponent	Score	Result	Competition
1	9 November 2024	Stade de France, Saint-Denis, France	Japan	43–7	52–12	2024 Autumn internationals
2	9 November 2024	Stade de France, Saint-Denis, France	Japan	50–12	52–12	2024 Autumn internationals
3	16 November 2024	Stade de France, Saint-Denis, France	New Zealand	15–17	30–29	2024 Autumn internationals
4	23 February 2025	Stadio Olimpico, Rome, Italy	Italy	17–26	24–73	2025 Six Nations
5	8 March 2025	Aviva Stadium, Dublin, Ireland	Ireland	13–13	25–42	2025 Six Nations

== Personal life ==
Boudehent is the younger brother of Pierre Boudehent, who also plays at La Rochelle as a centre or a wing.

== Honours ==
France

- 2x Six Nations Championship: 2025, 2026

La Rochelle

- 2× European Rugby Champions Cup: 2021–22, 2022–23
- 1× European Rugby Champions Cup runner-up: 2020–21
- 2× Top 14 runner-up: 2020–21, 2022–23
