= Pierre Boudehent =

French rugby union player

- Born: Pierre Boudehent; 6 February 1998 (age 28) Angers, France
- Height: 1.94 m (6 ft 4 1/2 in)
- Weight: 107 kg (16 st 12 lb; 236 lb)

Rugby union career
- Position(s): Centre, Wing
- Current team: Stade Français
Youth career
- 2009–2013: Angers
- 2013–2015: Nantes
- 2015–2017: La Rochelle
Senior career
Years	Team	Apps	(Points)
2017–23	La Rochelle	40	(40)
2020	→ Vannes (loan)	1	(5)
2023–	Stade Français	14	(0)
- Correct as of 5 November 2022
International career
Years	Team	Apps	(Points)
2018	France U20	4	(5)
- Correct as of 16 March 2018
National sevens team
Years	Team		Comps
2017–	France		
- Correct as of 3 February 2019

Pierre Boudehent (born 6 February 1998) is a French rugby union player, who currently plays as a centre or a wing for La Rochelle in the Top 14 and the Heineken Champions Cup.

== Early life ==
Pierre Boudehent started rugby in Angers, then moved to Nantes in 2013 and finally joined the La Rochelle youth system in 2015.

== International career ==
On 7 November 2022, Boudehent was first called by Fabien Galthié to the France national team for the Autumn internationals.

== Personal life ==
Boudehent is the older brother of Paul Boudehent, who also plays at La Rochelle as a flanker.

== Honours ==
=== La Rochelle ===
- European Rugby Champions Cup: 2021–22, 2022–23

=== France U20 ===
- Six Nations Under 20s Championship: 2018
