= Luca Rizzoli =

Italy international rugby union player

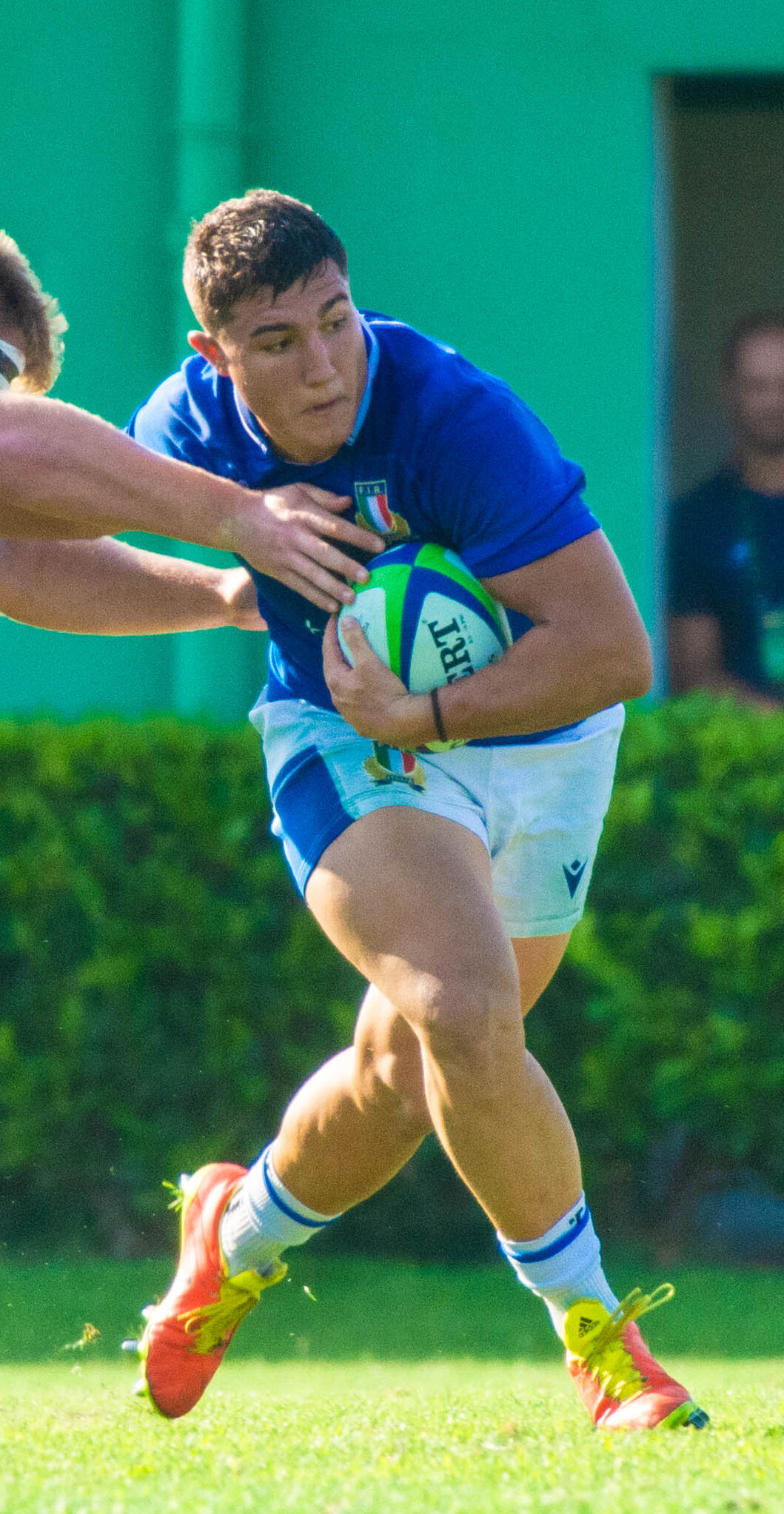
- Rizzoli in 2022
- Born: 3 May 2002 (age 24) Rome, Italy
- Height: 180 cm (5 ft 11 in)
- Weight: 110 kg (243 lb; 17 st 5 lb)

Rugby union career
- Position: Prop
- Current team: Zebre Parma
Youth career
- Capitolina
- 2020−2022: F.I.R. Academy
Senior career
| Years | Team | Apps | (Points) |
| 2022– | Zebre Parma | 44 | (5) |
- Correct as of 31 May 2025
International career
| Years | Team | Apps | (Points) |
| 2021–2022 | Italy U20 | 14 | (5) |
| 2025– | Italy | 2 | (0) |
- Correct as of 31 May 2025

Luca Rizzoli (born 3 May 2002) is an Italian professional rugby union player who primarily plays prop for Zebre Parma of the United Rugby Championship.

== Professional career ==
Rizzoli previously played for clubs such as Capitolina. He signed for Zebre Parma in May 2022 ahead of the 2022–23 United Rugby Championship as Academy Player. He made his debut in Round 3 of the 2022–23 season against the Munster.

In 2021 and 2022 Rizzoli was named in Italy U20s squad for annual Six Nations Under 20s Championship.

On 28 January 2025, he was named in Italy squad for 2025 Six Nations Championship. He made his debut against Scotland.
