= Fin Baxter =

English rugby union player (born 2002)

- Born: 12 February 2002 (age 24) London, England
- Height: 1.83 m (6 ft 0 in)
- Weight: 116 kg (18 st 4 lb; 256 lb)
- School: Wellington College

Rugby union career
- Position: Loosehead Prop
- Current team: Harlequins
Senior career
| Years | Team | Apps | (Points) |
| 2020– | Harlequins | 82 | (25) |
- Correct as of 26 October 2026
International career
| Years | Team | Apps | (Points) |
| 2019-20 | England U18 | 7 | (0) |
| 2021–22 | England U20 | 6 | (0) |
| 2024– | England | 17 | (5) |
- Correct as of 10 November 2026

Fin Baxter (born 12 February 2002) is an English professional rugby union player who plays for Premiership club Harlequins and the England national team. His main position is loosehead prop but he can also play tighthead prop.

== Early life ==
Baxter was born in the London Borough of Richmond upon Thames growing up in Cobham. Alongside rugby, he also grew up playing football and competing in Judo. He attended Wellington College.

== Club career ==
In 2015 at the age of thirteen Baxter joined the Harlequins academy and in June 2020 upgraded to full-time basis as a tighthead prop. He would later switch permanently to loosehead. In December 2020, Baxter made his debut for the first team coming on as a replacement in a defeat against Racing 92 at the Stoop.

In June 2021, Baxter won the Premiership title, with Harlequins beating Exeter Chiefs 40–38 in the highest scoring Premiership final ever. Although he did not play in the final, his appearances as part of the first team throughout the season meant he qualified as part of the squad.

In December 2022, aged only 20 Baxter won Man of the Match for his performance against Racing 92 in the Champions Cup as Harlequins won the match 14–10.

In April 2024, Baxter started as they beat Glasgow Warriors 28–24 at home in the Champions Cup Round of 16, the first time the club had ever won a knockout game in the competition. Despite the victory, he was replaced earlier than usual by Joe Marler after sustaining an injury to his arm. The following week in the absence of Joe Marler, he started against Bordeaux Bègles, winning 42–41, making it only the second time the club had won in the knockout stages of the competition and the first away victory at this stage. His performance was highly praised having won multiple penalties at the scrum against international prop Ben Tameifuna. He also started in their semi-final elimination against Toulouse. Following an impressive season he was named in the Premiership Rugby Team of the Season for the 2023–24 campaign.

In October 2024, he scored his first try of the season during a 17–10 victory over Saracens.

Having not played since sustaining a foot injury in December 2025, during a 68–14 victory against Bayonne in the Champions Cup, requiring two operations, Baxter finally returned to training in October 2026 ahead of Harlequins next fixture against Saracens. He went to start the fixture, a game they won 33–15.

== International career ==
In 2019 Baxter captained the England under-18 team. He made his debut for the England under-20 side in the penultimate round of the 2021 Six Nations Under 20s Championship as they defeated Wales to secure the junior version of the Triple Crown. He then started in the final round as England beat Italy at Cardiff Arms Park to achieve a Grand slam. The following year saw Baxter Captain the side during the 2022 tournament.

In February 2024 Baxter was called up to the England A team alongside Harlequins teammates Sam Riley, Oscar Beard and Cadan Murley and started in their victory over Portugal.

In May 2024 Baxter received his first call-up to the senior England squad by coach Steve Borthwick for a training camp in preparation for their tour of New Zealand. On 6 July 2024 he made his Test debut coming off the bench as a first-half replacement for the injured Joe Marler in a loss at Forsyth Barr Stadium. The following weekend saw him make his first start as England were defeated by New Zealand at Eden Park to lose the series.

In February 2025, he scored his first try for England during a 26–25 victory over France during the 2025 Six Nations. In August 2025, he awarded an Elite Player Squad (EPS) contract by England for the 2025–26 season becoming only the second Harlequins player ever to receive one after Marcus Smith.

=== List of international tries ===
As of 11 February 2025

| Try | Opposing team | Location | Venue | Competition | Date | Result | Score |
|---|---|---|---|---|---|---|---|
| 1 | France | London, England | Allianz Stadium | 2025 Six Nations | 8 February 2025 | Win | 26 - 25 |

== Honours ==
Harlequins

- Premiership Rugby: 2020–21

England U20

- Six Nations Under 20s Championship: 2021
- U20s Grand Slam: 2021
