= Blair Murray =

Wales international rugby union player

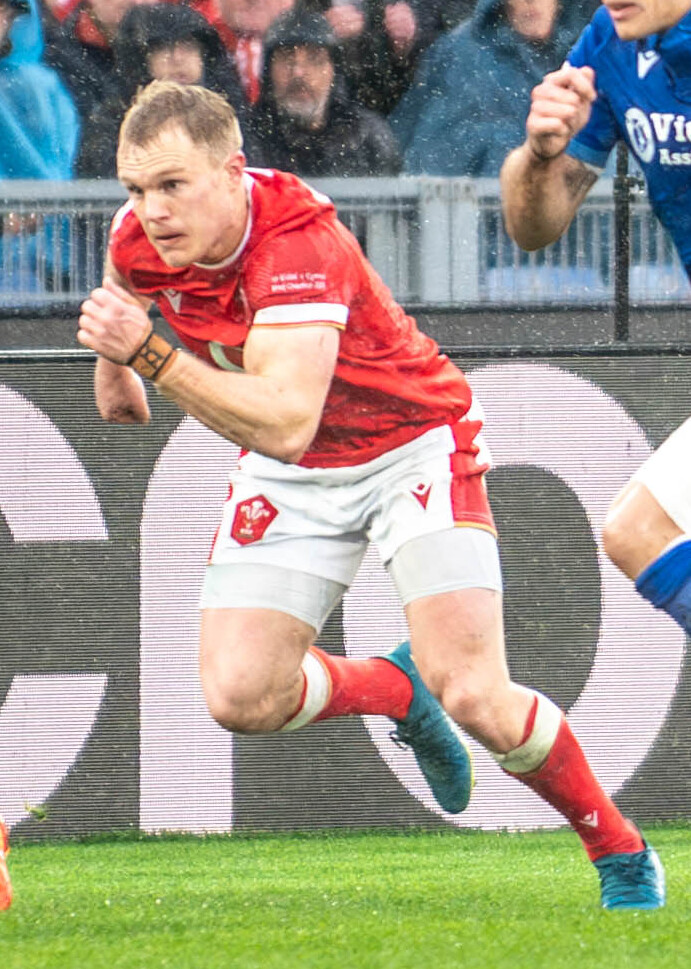
- Murray playing for Wales in 2025
- Born: 9 October 2001 (age 25) Hāwera, New Zealand
- Height: 173 cm (5 ft 8 in)
- Weight: 75 kg (165 lb; 11 st 11 lb)
- School: New Plymouth Boys' High School

Rugby union career
- Position(s): Fly-half; Wing; Full-back
- Current team: Scarlets
Senior career
Years	Team	Apps	(Points)
2022–2023	Canterbury	8	(35)
2024–	Scarlets	16	(50)
- Correct as of 18 November 2026
International career
Years	Team	Apps	(Points)
2024–	Wales	22	(20)
- Correct as of 18 November 2026

Blair Murray (born 9 October 2001) is a Welsh professional rugby union player who plays for United Rugby Championship side Scarlets and the Wales national rugby union team. Born in New Zealand, he qualifies for Wales on ancestry grounds.

== Early life ==
From Hāwera, Murray attended New Plymouth Boys' High School and played for New Zealand Schools. He played for Southern Rugby Club.

== Club career ==
=== Canterbury ===
He is capable of playing at fly-half or across the back line at wing or full-back. Between 2021 and 2023, he played for Canterbury in the National Provincial Championship.

=== Scarlets ===
He signed for Welsh side Scarlets of the United Rugby Championship in June 2024. Murray made his debut for the Scarlets on 7 September 2024 in a pre-season friendly against Leicester Tigers. His competitive debut came on 21 September, in the opening round against Benetton, nearly scoring on his first appearance. His first try came on 18 October 2024, in a win over the Bulls, and scored again the following week against Zebre Parma.

In his first season with the Scarlets, Murray was named as the players’ player of the season during the end of season awards. He was also named in the United Rugby Championship Elite XV and was named the Welsh Rugby Writers' young player of the year.

== International career ==
=== Wales ===
He was called-up to the Wales national team for the first time in October 2024 for the 2024 end-of-year rugby union internationals. Murray made his debut on 10 November 2024, starting on the wing against Fiji, and scored his first try during the match He started against Australia the following week, before moving to fullback for the final fixture against South Africa.

Murray was retained in the squad for the 2025 Six Nations Championship. Murray was selected for the 2025 end-of-year rugby union internationals. He scored a try in the loss against Argentina.

Murray continued in the Wales squad for the 2026 Six Nations and the inaugural Nations Championship, and was a starter on 14 November 2026 as Wales defeated New Zealand for the first time in 73 years, with a 35-28 win in Cardiff. The following weekend, he was a try-scorer for Wales in a narrow 26-29 defeat to Australia in the Championship.

=== International tries ===
Try	Opponent	Location	Venue	Competition	Date	Result
1	Fiji	Cardiff, Wales	Millennium Stadium	International Friendly	21 November 2024	Loss
2	Scotland	Edinburgh, Scotland	Murrayfield Stadium	2025 Six Nations	8 March 2025	Loss
3	Argentina	Cardiff, Wales	Millennium Stadium	International Friendly	9 November 2025	Loss
4	Australia	Cardiff, Wales	Millennium Stadium	2026 Nations Championship	21 November 2026	Loss

== Personal life ==
He is Welsh qualified through his mother, who is from Tonyrefail.
