= Ange Capuozzo =

Italy international rugby union player

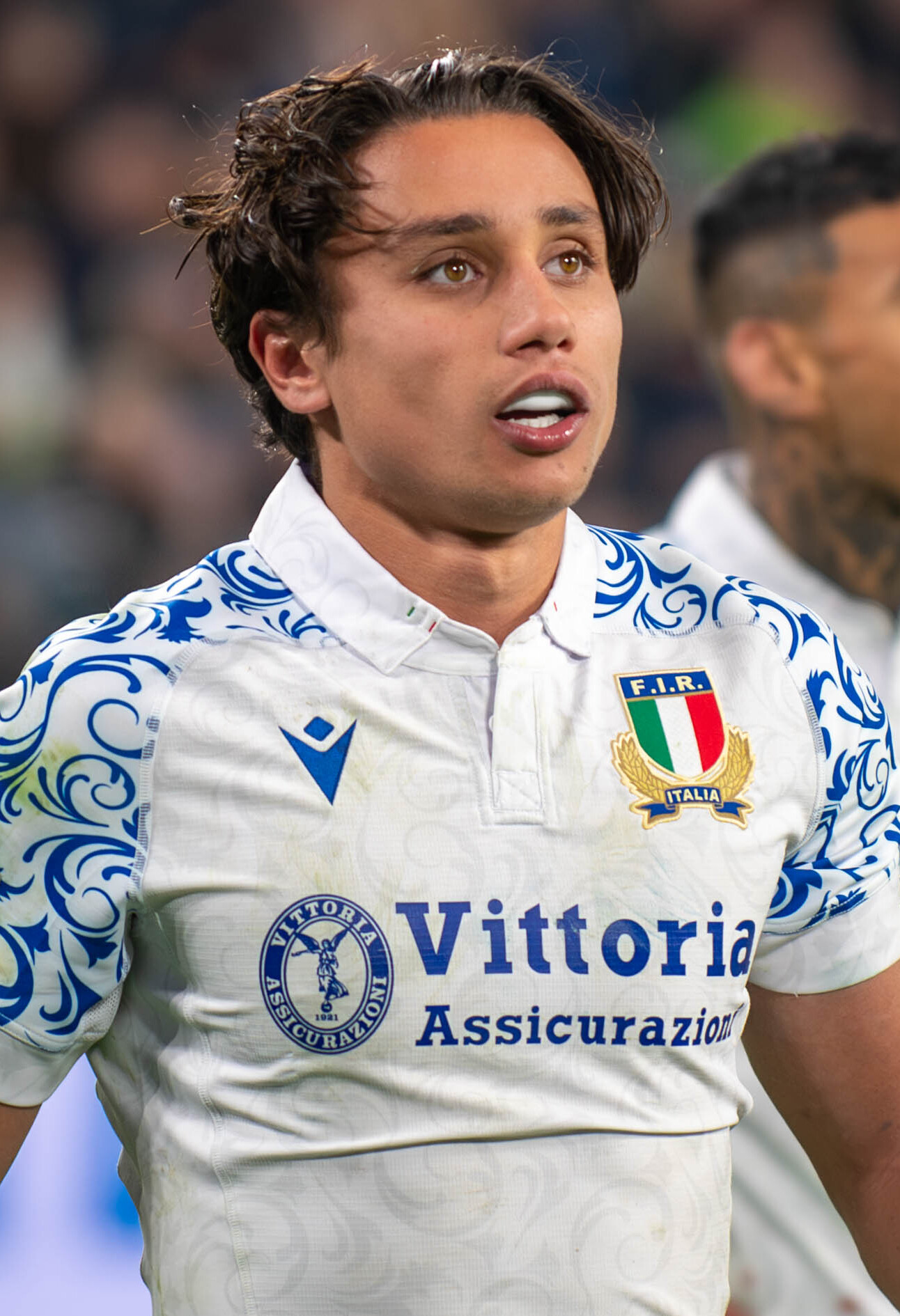
- Capuozzo with Italy in 2024
- Born: 30 April 1999 (age 27) Le Pont-de-Claix, Isère, France
- Height: 1.77 m (5 ft 10 in)
- Weight: 80 kg (176 lb; 12 st 8 lb)

Rugby union career
- Position(s): Fullback, Wing
- Current team: Toulouse
Youth career
- 2005–2010: US Deux Ponts
- 2010–2019: Grenoble
Senior career
Years	Team	Apps	(Points)
2019–2022	Grenoble	52	(90)
2022–	Toulouse	65	(180)
- Correct as of 24 October 2026
International career
Years	Team	Apps	(Points)
2019	Italy U20	5	(10)
2022–	Italy	33	(85)
- Correct as of 7 November 2026

Ange Capuozzo (French: [ɑ̃ʒ kapwɔdzo], Italian: [kaˈpwɔttso]; born 30 April 1999) is a professional Italian-French rugby union player who plays as a full-back or a wing for French Top 14 club Toulouse and the Italian national team.

Born and raised in France, Capuozzo qualified for Italy through his paternal grandparents. He began his career at Grenoble before signing for Toulouse in 2022. After previously playing for the Italy U20 and Italy A teams, he made his senior debut for Italy against Scotland during the 2022 Six Nations Championship.

== Early life ==
Ange Capuozzo was born on 30 April 1999 in Le Pont-de-Claix, in the outskirts of Grenoble, France to French parents. His father is of Italian descent; Capuozzo's paternal grandparents were from the Naples area and arrived in Isère after World War II when they were children. His maternal grandfather is Malagasy while his maternal grandmother is French.

Capuozzo grew up and started playing rugby in his hometown. In 2010, he joined professional club Grenoble's youth system.

== Club career ==
=== Grenoble ===
On 18 May 2019, Capuozzo made his senior debut with Grenoble in an away game at Pau, playing his only game of the 2018–19 Top 14 season. On 6 December, he scored his first try in a home win against Rouen in the 2019–20 Pro D2 season.

In the 2020–21 Pro D2 season, he scored 10 tries in 21 games and finished as the league's top tryscorer.

=== Toulouse ===
On 13 May 2022, Capuozzo signed for Toulouse on a three-year contract. On 11 September, he made his club debut in a 28–8 home win against Toulon. Two weeks later, he scored his first try for Toulouse in a home win against Racing 92, playing as a wing.

On 29 January 2023, he scored his first brace against Top 14 defending champions Montpellier.

== International career ==
Born in France to French parents, Capuozzo was eligible to represent France at international level but chose to play for Italy, qualifying through his paternal grandparents. In 2019, he was called up to the Italy U20 squad for the 2019 World Rugby Under 20 Championship, and finished the competition with 2 tries in 5 games.

On 14 October 2021, he was called up to the Italy A national team by Fabio Roselli for the 2021 end-of-year rugby union internationals and played both games against Spain and Uruguay.

On 24 January 2022, Capuozzo was called up to the Italy national team by Kieran Crowley for the 2022 Six Nations Championship. On 12 March, he scored two tries against Scotland in only 35 minutes for his senior debut. One week later, he was Italy starting full-back against Wales and played the whole eighty minutes. In the closing stages, he made a last-minute run, breaking a tackle before passing to Edoardo Padovani who scored the winning try, sealing Italy's first win against Wales since 2007 and ending a 36-match losing streak in the Six Nations Championship. After the game, Wales wing Josh Adams gave his Player of the Match trophy to Capuozzo as a mark of respect despite being awarded for his performance a bit earlier in the game.

On 28 October, he was called up for the 2022 Autumn internationals. On 12 November, he scored two tries as Italy beat Australia for the first time in Italian rugby history, winning 28-27 in Florence. One week later, he scored another try in a home loss against South Africa in Genoa. The next day, Capuozzo was named 2022 World Rugby Men's 15s Breakthrough Player of the Year at the World Rugby Awards.

In 2023, he was selected in Italy's Six Nations squad, starting and scoring a try in an opening defeat to France.

On 22 August 2023, he was named in Italy's 33-man squad for the 2023 Rugby World Cup.

=== International tries ===
As of 22 February 2026

#	Date	Venue	Opponent	Result	Score	Competition
1.	12 March 2022	Stadio Olimpico, Rome, Italy	Scotland	Loss	22–33	2022 Six Nations
2.	12 March 2022	Stadio Olimpico, Rome, Italy	Scotland	Loss	22–33	2022 Six Nations
3.	12 November 2022	Stadio Artemio Franchi, Florence, Italy	Australia	Win	28–27	2022 November Internationals
4.	12 November 2022	Stadio Artemio Franchi, Florence, Italy	Australia	Win	28–27	2022 November Internationals
5.	19 November 2022	Stadio Luigi Ferraris, Genoa, Italy	South Africa	Loss	21–63	2022 November Internationals
6.	5 February 2023	Stadio Olimpico, Rome, Italy	France	Loss	24–29	2023 Six Nations
7.	19 August 2023	Stadio Riviera delle Palme, San Benedetto del Tronto, Italy	Romania	Win	57–7	2023 RWC Warm-Ups
8.	19 August 2023	Stadio Riviera delle Palme, San Benedetto del Tronto, Italy	Romania	Win	57–7	2023 RWC Warm-Ups
9.	9 September 2023	Stade Geoffroy-Guichard, Saint-Etienne, France	Namibia	Win	8-52	2023 Rugby World Cup
10.	29 September 2023	Parc Olympique Lyonnais, Lyon, France	New Zealand	Loss	96-17	2023 Rugby World Cup
11.	25 February 2024	Stade Pierre-Mauroy, Lille, France	France	Draw	13-13	2024 Six Nations
12.	21 July 2024	Sapporo Dome, Sapporo, Japan	Japan	Win	14-42	2024 July Internationals
13.	8 February 2025	Stadio Olimpico, Rome, Italy	Wales	Win	22-15	2025 Six Nations
14.	9 March 2025	Twickenham Stadium, London, England	England	Loss	47-24	2025 Six Nations
15.	15 November 2025	Juventus Stadium, Turin, Italy	South Africa	Loss	14-32	2025 November Internationals
16.	22 November 2025	Stadio Luigi Ferraris, Genoa, Italy	Chile	Win	34-19	2025 November Internationals
17.	22 February 2026	Stade Pierre-Mauroy, Lille, France	France	Loss	33-8	2026 Six Nations

== Honours ==
=== Club ===
(France) Toulouse

- European Rugby Champions Cup: 2023-24
- Top 14: 2022–23, 2023-24
