= Will Hurd (rugby union) =

Scottish rugby union player

- Born: William Arthur Hurd; 29 June 1999 (age 27) Ashby-de-la-Zouch, Leicestershire, England
- Height: 1.88 m (6 ft 2 in)
- Weight: 121 kg (267 lb)
- School: Ashby School; Loughborough College
- University: Cardiff Metropolitan University

Rugby union career
- Position: Tighthead Prop
- Current team: Leicester Tigers
Senior career
Years	Team	Apps	(Points)
2021–	Leicester Tigers	85	(10)
- Correct as of 1 November 2026
International career
Years	Team	Apps	(Points)
2019	Scotland U20	9	(0)
2024–	Scotland	15	(5)
2026	Scotland A	1	(0)
- Correct as of 18 November 2026

William Arthur Hurd (born 29 June 1999) is a Scotland international rugby union player for Leicester Tigers in Premiership Rugby, his preferred position is prop. Born in Ashby, Leicestershire, Hurd qualifies for Scotland through his maternal grandmother and previously represented Scotland under 20s during the 2019 World Rugby Under 20 Championship.

== Career ==
Hurd began playing rugby at Ashby RFC, and was selected in a Midlands under 18s side in 2016, before attending Cardiff Metropolitan University. Hurd was selected for Scotland's under 20s in 2019, before being selected for the BUCS Super Rugby team of the year in 2020.

On 17 February 2021 Hurd signed for his home town side Leicester Tigers. He made his debut as a replacement in Leicester's European Rugby Challenge Cup Round of 16 win against Connacht on 3 April 2021.

=== International career ===
In January 2024 Hurd was named in Scotland's squad for the 2024 Six Nations Championship, but injured a foot in Leicester's next game, a defeat to Leinster in the European Champions Cup, and had to drop out.

He made his Scotland debut against Canada on 6 July 2024 at TD Place Stadium in Ottawa. Scotland won the match 73 points to 12. Hurd has the Scotland no. 1226.

He played for Scotland 'A' on 6 February 2026 in their match against Italy XV.
