= Matt Sherratt =

English rugby union coach (born 1978)

- Born: 1976 (age 49–50) Gloucester
- School: Crypt Grammar School, Gloucester
- University: University of Gloucester

Rugby union career
Coaching career
- Years: Team
- 2005–2006: England Rugby (Development coach)
- 2006–2011: Worcester Warriors (Academy coach)
- 2011–2016: Bristol Bears (Backs coach)
- 2016–2017: Cardiff Blues (Backs and Attack coach)
- 2017: Wales (Assistant coach)
- 2017–2019: Ospreys (Backs coach)
- 2019–2020: Ospreys (Interim head coach)
- 2020: Worcester Warriors (Backs coach)
- 2023–2025: Cardiff Rugby (Head coach)
- 2025: Wales (Interim head coach)
- 2025–: Wales (Attack coach)
- Correct as of 28 October 2025

Matt Sherratt is an English professional rugby union coach. He is currently the head coach of Cardiff Rugby who play in the United Rugby Championship competition.

He had previously been backs coach at the Ospreys and Cardiff Blues. During the 2019–20 Pro14 he took over from Allen Clarke as head coach of the Ospreys on an interim basis alongside Carl Hogg. Previously he had worked in England at Worcester Warriors and Bristol Bears, while he also worked for the Rugby Football Union.

== Coaching career ==
=== Wales (2025) ===
Since February 2025, Matt Sherratt has served as the interim head coach of the Wales national rugby team following the departure of Warren Gatland. His first game in charge was against reigning Six Nations champions Ireland in the Round 3 of the 2025 tournament. Despite a commendable performance, including a 13–10 half-time lead, they went on to lose 27–18. This extended Wales longest losing run to 15 consecutive games. After 18 consecutive losses, he led Wales to a 31–22 victory over Japan in the final fixture of the summer tour. Following the match, he departed from the Wales interim position being succeeded by Steve Tandy.

In September 2025, he left his role as head coach of Cardiff having been re-appointed to the Wales setup as an attack coach ahead of the 2025 Autumn Nations Series.
