= 2024–25 European Rugby Champions Cup pool stage =

European Rugby Champions Cup pool stage

The 2024–25 European Rugby Champions Cup pool stage will be the first stage of the 30th season of the pan-European professional club rugby union competition, and the eleventh under the European Rugby Champions Cup format. Twenty-four clubs from three major domestic and regional leagues competed over four rounds of pool fixtures, with 16 teams progressing to the knockout stages.

== Structure ==
The pool stage draw took place on 2 July 2024. The complete fixture list was then announced on 12 July 2024. The fixtures will be played out across four weekends between 6 December 2024 and 19 January 2025.

Teams play other teams in the same pool, except the other team from their own league, with two games at home and two away. The top four teams in each pool progress to the round of 16, whilst the teams ranked 5th progress to the knockout stages of the 2024–25 EPCR Challenge Cup.

Teams are awarded points based on match performances; four points for a win, two points for a draw, one attacking bonus point for scoring four or more tries in a match and one defensive bonus point for losing a match by seven points or fewer.

If two or more clubs in the same pool are equal on match points, their ranking will be determined as follows:

1. the best aggregate points difference from the pool stage; or
2. if equal, the number of tries scored in the pool stage; or
3. if equal, the club with the fewest number of players suspended for disciplinary incidents in the pool stage; or
4. if still equal, by drawing lots.

== Pool 1 ==
European Rugby Champions Cup Pool 1
| Pos | Team | Pld | W | D | L | PF | PA | PD | TF | TA | TB | LB | Pts | Qualification |
|---|---|---|---|---|---|---|---|---|---|---|---|---|---|---|
| 1 | (France) Bordeaux Bègles (1) | 4 | 4 | 0 | 0 | 217 | 76 | +141 | 33 | 12 | 4 | 0 | 20 | Home Champions Cup round of 16. |
| 2 | (France) Toulouse (5) | 4 | 4 | 0 | 0 | 225 | 62 | +163 | 33 | 9 | 3 | 0 | 19 | Home Champions Cup round of 16. |
| 3 | (England) Leicester Tigers (10) | 4 | 2 | 0 | 2 | 134 | 149 | −15 | 20 | 21 | 3 | 0 | 11 | Away Champions Cup round of 16. |
| 4 | (Ireland) Ulster (16) | 4 | 1 | 0 | 3 | 102 | 163 | −61 | 15 | 24 | 1 | 0 | 5 | Away Champions Cup round of 16. |
| 5 | (South Africa) Sharks (12CC) | 4 | 1 | 0 | 3 | 76 | 163 | −87 | 10 | 23 | 1 | 0 | 5 | Away Challenge Cup round of 16. |
| 6 | (England) Exeter Chiefs | 4 | 0 | 0 | 4 | 83 | 224 | −141 | 13 | 34 | 1 | 0 | 1 | |

Source: EPCR
Rules for classification: Tiebreakers for teams tied on points: 1) Number of matches won; 2) Difference between points for and against; 3) Total number of points for; 4) Aggregate number of points scored in matches between tied teams; 5) Number of matches won excluding the first match, then the second and so on until the tie is settled.

=== Round 1 ===
7 December 2024
13:00

| (1 BP) Sharks (South Africa) | 39–21 | (England) Exeter Chiefs |
| Try: Buthelezi 20' c Mapimpi 23' m Williams 26' c Kolisi (2) 35' c, 55' c Con: Jo. Hendrikse (4/5) 21', 27', 37', 57'; Pen: Jo. Hendrikse (2/2) 45', 69' | Report | Try: Frost (2) 13' c, 40' c Feyi-Waboso 66' c Con: Hodge (3/4) 15', 40+1', 67' |

Hollywoodbets Kings Park, Durban
Attendance: 10,452
Referee: Jeremy Rozier (France)

8 December 2024
13:00

| (1 BP) Bordeaux Bègles (France) | 42–28 | (England) Leicester Tigers (1 BP) |
| Try: Samu (2) 6' c, 45' c Petti 27' c Bielle-Biarrey (2) 43' c, 49' c Depoortère 72' c Con: Jalibert (6/6) 7', 28', 44', 46', 49', 73' | Report | Try: Wells 5' c Bassett 14' c Joussain 34' c Perese 80+1' c Con: Shillcock (4/4) 6', 15', 35', 80+2' |

Stade Chaban-Delmas, Bordeaux
Attendance: 32,215
Referee: Nika Amashukeli (Georgia)

8 December 2024
15:15

| (1 BP) Toulouse (France) | 61–21 | (Ireland) Ulster |
| Try: Lebel 1' m Ntamack 8' c Meafou (2) 14' c, 40' c Capuozzo (2) 27' c, 56' c Dupont 29' c Chocobares 50' c Penalty try 80'; Con: Ramos (7/8) 9', 15', 28', 30', 40+3', 51', 57' | Report | Try: McCormick 12' c Moore 36' c Henderson 67' c Con: Doak (3/3) 12', 36', 68' |

Stade Ernest-Wallon, Toulouse
Attendance: 18,837
Referee: Adam Leal (England)

=== Round 2 ===
14 December 2024
15:15

| Ulster (Ireland) | 19–40 | (France) Bordeaux Bègles (1 BP) |
| Try: Izuchukwu 6' c Timoney 18' c Kok 40' m Con: Doak (2/3) 6', 19' | Report | Try: Tatafu 2' c Penalty try 27'; Penaud 61' c Petti 67' c Bielle-Biarrey 71' c Boniface 78' m Con: Carbery (2/2) 3', 62'; García (2/3) 68', 71' |

Kingspan Stadium, Belfast
Attendance: 11,576
Referee: Gianluca Gnecchi (Italy)

14 December 2024
17:30

| (1 BP) Leicester Tigers (England) | 56–17 | (South Africa) Sharks |
| Try: Montoya (2) 9' c, 24' c Hassell-Collins 27' c Kata 34' c Pollard 39' c Poortvliet 43' c Clare 71' c Ilione 80+2' c Con: Pollard (6/6) 10', 25', 28', 35', 40', 44'; Shillcock (2/2) 72', 80+2' | Report | Try: E. Tshituka 20' c Hooker 60' c Con: Masuku (2/2) 21', 61'; Pen: Masuku (1/1) 3' |

Mattioli Woods Welford Road, Leicester
Attendance: 17,168
Referee: Andrea Piardi (Italy)

15 December 2024
17:30

| Exeter Chiefs (England) | 21–64 | (France) Toulouse (1 BP) |
| Try: Wyatt (2) 31' c, 45' c Hodge 57' c Con: Slade (3/3) 32', 46', 57' | Report | Try: Dupont 8' c Cros 16' c Lebel (2) 28' c, 41' m Flament 35' c Barassi (2) 40' c, 49' m T. Ntamack 61' c Kinghorn 69' c Graou 77' m Con: Ramos (7/10) 9', 17', 30', 36', 40', 62', 70 |

Sandy Park, Exeter
Attendance: 13,832
Referee: Andrew Brace (Ireland)

=== Round 3 ===
11 January 2025
15:15

| Exeter Chiefs (England) | 17–69 | (France) Bordeaux Bègles (1 BP) |
| Try: Brown-Bampoe (2) 7' m, 47' c Hammersley 69' m Con: Slade 48' | Report | Try: Lucu (2) 9' c, 30' c Penaud (3) 14' c, 43' m, 76' c Bielle-Biarrey (2) 35' m, 61' c Lamothe 42' m Cazeaux 54' c Jalibert 63' c Lesgourgues 65' m Con: Jalibert (7) 10', 15', 31', 55', 62', 63', 77' |

Sandy Park, Exeter
Attendance: 10,234
Referee: Ben Whitehouse (Wales)

11 January 2025
15:15

| Sharks (South Africa) | 8–20 | (France) Toulouse |
| Try: Julius 66' m Pen: J.O. Hendrikse (1/1) 13' | Report | Try: Meafou 9' c Kinghorn 42' c Con: Ramos (2/2) 9', 43'; Pen: Ramos (2/2) 35', 40+2' |

Hollywoodbets Kings Park, Durban
Attendance: 24,762
Referee: Luke Pearce (England)

11 January 2025
20:00

| (1 BP) Leicester Tigers (England) | 38–10 | (Ireland) Ulster |
| Try: Bassett (3) 17' c, 40+1' m, 60' c Hassell-Collins (2) 48' m, 51' c Perese 62' c Con: Pollard (2/4) 18', 52'; Steward (1/1) 61'; Shillcock (1/1) 63' | Report | Try: Timoney 8' c Con: Doak (1/1) 9'; Pen: Doak (1/1) 8' |

Mattioli Woods Welford Road, Leicester
Attendance: 16,429
Referee: Craig Evans (Wales)

=== Round 4 ===
17 January 2025
20:00

| (1 BP) Ulster (Ireland) | 52–24 | (England) Exeter Chiefs (1 BP) |
| Try: Izuchukwu (3) 20' c, 65' c, 77' c McCann (2) 26' m, 73' c Timoney 37' m Herring 48' c Carson 67' c Con: Doak (2/4) 21', 49'; Cooney (4/4) 66', 69', 74', 78' | Report | Try: Brown-Bampoe 2' c Vintcent 13' m Tuima 29' m Wimbush 79' c Con: Haydon-Wood (1/3) 3'; Skinner (1/1) 80' |

Kingspan Stadium, Belfast
Attendance: 13,093
Referee: Hollie Davidson (Scotland)

19 January 2025
13:00

| (1 BP) Bordeaux Bègles (France) | 66–12 | (South Africa) Sharks |
| Try: Penaud (6) 12' m, 17' c, 39' c, 66' c, 71' m, 75' c Lucu 43' c Boniface 49' c Moefana 53' c Nguimbous 78' c Con: Jalibert (8/10) 18', 40', 44', 50', 54', 67', 76', 79' | Report | Try: Masuku 3' c Kunene 7' m Con: Masuku (1/2) 4' |

Stade Chaban-Delmas, Bordeaux
Attendance: 32,215
Referee: Christophe Ridley (England)

19 January 2025
15:15

| (1 BP) Toulouse (France) | 80–12 | (England) Leicester Tigers |
| Try: Dupont (2) 5' c, 75' c Delibes 14' c Meafou (2) 16' c, 32' c Capuozzo (2) 20' c, 52' c Marchand 23' c Flament (2) 45' m, 71' m Ramos 66' c Lebel 79' c Con: Ramos (10/12) 6', 14', 17', 21', 24', 33', 53', 67', 76', 80' | Report | Try: van Poortvliet 43' c Hurd 64' m Con: Shillcock (1/2) 44' |

Stade Ernest-Wallon, Toulouse
Attendance: 18,800
Referee: Ben Whitehouse (Wales)

== Pool 2 ==
European Rugby Champions Cup Pool 2
| Pos | Team | Pld | W | D | L | PF | PA | PD | TF | TA | TB | LB | Pts | Qualification |
|---|---|---|---|---|---|---|---|---|---|---|---|---|---|---|
| 1 | (Ireland) Leinster (2) | 4 | 4 | 0 | 0 | 113 | 54 | +59 | 15 | 7 | 2 | 0 | 18 | Home Champions Cup round of 16. |
| 2 | (France) La Rochelle (8) | 4 | 2 | 0 | 2 | 98 | 75 | +23 | 12 | 6 | 1 | 2 | 11 | Home Champions Cup round of 16. |
| 3 | (Italy) Benetton (11) | 4 | 2 | 0 | 2 | 83 | 109 | −26 | 11 | 14 | 2 | 1 | 11 | Away Champions Cup round of 16. |
| 4 | (France) Clermont (14) | 4 | 2 | 0 | 2 | 89 | 81 | +8 | 13 | 12 | 2 | 0 | 10 | Away Champions Cup round of 16. |
| 5 | (England) Bath (10CC) | 4 | 1 | 0 | 3 | 102 | 114 | −12 | 14 | 16 | 1 | 2 | 7 | Away Challenge Cup round of 16. |
| 6 | (England) Bristol Bears | 4 | 1 | 0 | 3 | 80 | 132 | −52 | 12 | 20 | 2 | 1 | 7 | |

Source: EPCR
Rules for classification: Tiebreakers for teams tied on points: 1) Number of matches won; 2) Difference between points for and against; 3) Total number of points for; 4) Aggregate number of points scored in matches between tied teams; 5) Number of matches won excluding the first match, then the second and so on until the tie is settled.

=== Round 1 ===
6 December 2024
20:00

| (1 BP) Bath (England) | 20–24 | (France) La Rochelle |
| Try: Dunn 47' c Roux 56' c Con: Russell (2/2) 48', 56'; Pen: Russell (2/2) 4', 30' | Report | Try: Jégou 17' c Wardi 26' c Kerr-Barlow 31' c Con: West (3/3) 18', 27', 32'; Pen: West (1/2) 58' |

The Rec, Bath
Attendance: 14,037
Referee: Andrew Brace (Ireland)

7 December 2024
13:00

| (1 BP) Clermont (France) | 28–0 | (Italy) Benetton |
| Try: Yato (2) 8' c, 74' c Massa (2) 32' c, 39' c Con: Urdapilleta (4/4) 9', 33', 40', 75' | Report |

Stade Marcel-Michelin, Clermont
Attendance: 14,641
Referee: Christophe Ridley (England)

8 December 2024
17:30

| Bristol Bears (England) | 12–35 | (Ireland) Leinster (1 BP) |
| Try: Lahiff 29' c Ibitoye 72' m Con: Janse van Rensburg (1/2) 31' | Report | Try: Larmour 32' c Prendergast (2) 52' c, 57' c Barrett 55' c van der Flier 63' c Con: Prendergast (5/5) 33', 52', 56', 58', 64' |

Ashton Gate, Bristol
Attendance: 15,680
Referee: Pierre Brousset (France)

=== Round 2 ===
14 December 2024
17:30

| Leinster (Ireland) | 15–7 | (France) Clermont |
| Try: Ringrose 21' c Barrett 25' m Con: Prendergast (1/2) 22'; Pen: Prendergast (1/1) 48' | Report | Try: Raka 4' c Con: Jauneau (1/1) 5' |

Aviva Stadium, Dublin (Note: Leinster relocated their home fixtures for the 2024–25 season to the Aviva Stadium, due to ongoing redevelopment work taking place at the RDS Arena – the club's usual home ground.)
Attendance: 34,184
Referee: Luke Pearce (England)

14 December 2024
20:00

| (1 BP) La Rochelle (France) | 35–7 | (England) Bristol Bears |
| Try: Nowell 16' c Latu 27' c Botia 50' c Seuteni 65' c Berjon 80+4' c Con: West (5/5) 17', 28', 51', 66', 80+5' | Report | Try: Bates 38' c Con: Worsley (1/1) 39' |

Stade Marcel-Deflandre, La Rochelle
Attendance: 16,700
Referee: Chris Busby (Ireland)

15 December 2024
13:00

| (1 BP) Benetton (Italy) | 22–21 | (England) Bath (1 BP) |
| Try: Smith (2) 8' m, 32' c Lynagh 15' m Bernasconi 79' m Con: Albornoz (1/3) 33' | Report | Try: Annett 23' c Bayliss 52' c du Toit 58' c Con: Bailey (3/3) 24', 53', 59' |

Stadio Comunale di Monigo, Treviso
Attendance: 4,642
Referee: Sam Grove-White (Scotland)

=== Round 3 ===
12 January 2025
15:15

| (1 BP) La Rochelle (France) | 14–16 | (Ireland) Leinster |
| Try: Leyds 65' m Pen: Hastoy (3/5) 3', 25', 59' | Report | Try: J. McCarthy 29' c Con: Prendergast (1/1) 30'; Pen: Prendergast (3/3) 10', 50', 54' |

Stade Marcel-Deflandre, La Rochelle
Attendance: 16,700
Referee: Nika Amashukeli (Georgia)

12 January 2025
15:15

| (1 BP) Bristol Bears (England) | 35–29 | (Italy) Benetton (2 BP) |
| Try: Williams 7' c Marmion (2) 17' c, 58' c Lahiff 43' c Thacker 51' c Con: Byrne (5/5) 8', 18', 44', 52', 58' | Report | Try: Smith 13' m Zuliani 22' c Gallagher 39' m Bernasconi 63' c Menoncello 68' m Con: Albornoz (2/5) 23', 64' |

Ashton Gate, Bristol
Attendance: 13,104
Referee: Luc Ramos (France)

12 January 2025
17:30

| (1 BP) Bath (England) | 40–21 | (France) Clermont |
| Try: de Glanville 1' c Russell 6' c Cokanasiga 26' c du Toit (2) 48' c, 56' m Lawrence 71' c Con: Russell (5/6) 2', 7', 27', 48', 72' | Report | Try: Fainga'a 12' c Belleau 37' c Yato 61' c Con: Belleau (3/3) 12', 38', 62' |

The Rec, Bath
Attendance: 12,335
Referee: Mike Adamson (Scotland) (Note: Adamson replaced original appointed referee Chris Busby (Ireland) following reports of his retirement.)

=== Round 4 ===
18 January 2025
15:15

| (1 BP) Clermont (France) | 33–26 | (England) Bristol Bears (2 BP) |
| Try: Newsome 17' m Raka (2) 39' c, 53' c Penalty try 75'; Ceyte 80+5' c Con: Belleau (2/3) 40', 54'; Urdapilleta (1/1) 80+6' | Report | Try: Penalty try 48'; Dun 60' m Heward 66' c Marmion 76' c Con: Byrne (2/3) 67', 77' |

Stade Marcel-Michelin, Clermont
Attendance: 17,415
Referee: Sam Grove-White (Scotland)

18 January 2025
17:30

| Benetton (Italy) | 32–25 | (France) La Rochelle (1 BP) |
| Try: N. Cannone 14' c Bernasconi 66' c Con: Albornoz (1/1) 14'; Smith (1/1) 67'; Pen: Albornoz (2/3) 22', 41'; Smith (4/5) 39', 49', 59', 62' | Report | Try: Nowell 24' m Kerr-Barlow (2) 44' c, 55' c Con: Hastoy (2/3) 45', 55'; Pen: Hastoy (2/2) 7', 12' |

Stadio Comunale di Monigo, Treviso
Attendance: 4,813
Referee: Matthew Carley (England)

18 January 2025
17:30

| (1 BP) Leinster (Ireland) | 47–21 | (England) Bath |
| Try: Henshaw (2) 9' m, 15' c Conan 36' c Snyman (2) 51' c, 76' c Ringrose 60' c Gibson-Park 67' c Con: Prendergast (6/7) 15', 37', 52', 61', 68', 76' | Report | Try: Barbeary 1' c de Glanville (2) 6' c, 39' c Con: Russell (3/3) 2', 7', 40' |

Aviva Stadium, Dublin
Attendance: 40,195
Referee: Luc Ramos (France)

== Pool 3 ==
European Rugby Champions Cup Pool 3
| Pos | Team | Pld | W | D | L | PF | PA | PD | TF | TA | TB | LB | Pts | Qualification |
|---|---|---|---|---|---|---|---|---|---|---|---|---|---|---|
| 1 | (England) Northampton Saints (3) | 4 | 3 | 0 | 1 | 137 | 106 | +31 | 20 | 15 | 4 | 0 | 16 | Home Champions Cup round of 16. |
| 2 | (France) Castres (6) | 4 | 3 | 0 | 1 | 105 | 86 | +19 | 13 | 13 | 2 | 0 | 14 | Home Champions Cup round of 16. |
| 3 | (Ireland) Munster (9) | 4 | 2 | 0 | 2 | 96 | 69 | +27 | 13 | 7 | 2 | 2 | 12 | Away Champions Cup round of 16. |
| 4 | (England) Saracens (13) | 4 | 2 | 0 | 2 | 91 | 71 | +20 | 11 | 9 | 2 | 1 | 11 | Away Champions Cup round of 16. |
| 5 | (South Africa) Bulls (11CC) | 4 | 1 | 0 | 3 | 84 | 113 | −29 | 12 | 15 | 1 | 0 | 5 | Away Challenge Cup round of 16. |
| 6 | (France) Stade Français | 4 | 1 | 0 | 3 | 76 | 144 | −68 | 11 | 21 | 1 | 0 | 5 | |

Source: EPCR
Rules for classification: Tiebreakers for teams tied on points: 1) Number of matches won; 2) Difference between points for and against; 3) Total number of points for; 4) Aggregate number of points scored in matches between tied teams; 5) Number of matches won excluding the first match, then the second and so on until the tie is settled.

=== Round 1 ===
7 December 2024
15:15

| (1 BP) Northampton Saints (England) | 38–8 | (France) Castres |
| Try: Dingwall 3' c Mayanavanua 8' c Augustus (2) 43' m, 62' m Langdon 49' c Pollock 75' c Con: F. Smith (4/6) 4', 9', 49', 75' | Report | Try: Collona 68' m Pen: Le Brun (1/2) 6' |

cinch Stadium at Franklin's Gardens, Northampton
Attendance: 12,801
Referee: Sam Grove-White (Scotland)

7 December 2024
17:30

| (1 BP) Munster (Ireland) | 33–7 | (France) Stade Français |
| Try: Abrahams 15' c Daly 29' c Kendellen 49' c Farrell 54' c Coombes 78' m Con: Crowley (4/5) 16', 30', 50', 55' | Report | Try: Castets 58' c Con: Henry (1/1) 59' |

Thomond Park, Limerick
Attendance: 17,241
Referee: Luke Pearce (England)

7 December 2024
17:30

| (1 BP) Saracens (England) | 27–5 | (South Africa) Bulls |
| Try: Carré 22' m George 48' c Willis 56' c Earl 64' m Con: Burke (2/4) 49', 57'; Pen: Burke (1/2) 35' | Report | Try: de Klerk 10' m |

StoneX Stadium, London
Attendance: 9,035
Referee: Craig Evans (Wales)

=== Round 2 ===
13 December 2024
20:00

| Castres (France) | 16–14 | (Ireland) Munster (1 BP) |
| Try: Papali'i 12' m Walcker 29' m Pen: Fernandez (1/1) 48'; Le Brun (1/1) 72' | Report | Try: Hodnett (2) 37' c, 68' c Con: Crowley (2/2) 38', 69' |

Stade Pierre-Fabre, Castres
Attendance: 9,615
Referee: Christophe Ridley (England)

14 December 2024
13:00

| Bulls (South Africa) | 21–30 | (England) Northampton Saints (1 BP) |
| Try: Coetzee 34' c Hanekom (2) 61' c, 69' c Con: Goosen (3/3) 35', 61', 70' | Report | Try: Hendy 31' m Augustus 40' c Freeman (2) 59' c, 76' m Con: F. Smith (2/4) 40+1', 59'; Pen: F. Smith (2/2) 57', 72' |

Loftus Versfeld, Pretoria
Attendance: 13,549
Referee: Luc Ramos (France)

15 December 2024
13:00 (Note: The kick-off between Stade Français and Saracens was rescheduled from its original time of 15:15 to a new time of 13:00, to avoid logistical clashes with another live sporting event – a football match between Paris Saint-Germain and Lyon – also taking place in Paris at the same time.)

| Stade Français (France) | 17–28 | (England) Saracens |
| Try: Dakuwaqa 3' c Barré 68' c Con: Henry (1/1) 4'; Barré (1/1) 69'; Pen: Henry (1/1) 12' | Report | Try: Williams 23' c George 45' m Dan 73' c Con: Burke (2/3) 24', 74'; Pen: Burke (3/4) 32', 37', 63' |

Stade Jean-Bouin, Paris
Attendance: 11,276
Referee: Hollie Davidson (Scotland)

=== Round 3 ===
11 January 2025
17:30

| Munster (Ireland) | 17–12 | (England) Saracens (1 BP) |
| Try: Bleuler 59'; Hodnett 64' c Con: Crowley (1/1) 60'; Pen: Crowley (2/3) 25', 65' | Report | Pen: Lozowski (3/3) 1', 10', 69'; Daly (1/1) 45' |

Thomond Park, Limerick
Attendance: 22,030
Referee: Pierre Brousset (France)

11 January 2025
17:30

| (1 BP) Stade Français (France) | 45–35 | (England) Northampton Saints (1 BP) |
| Try: Dakuwaqa 22' m van der Mescht 29' c Tanga (2) 40+2' c, 57' c Penalty try 51'; Ezeala 51' m Gabrillagues 68' c Con: Henry (4/6) 30', 40+3', 58', 69' | Report | Try: Lockett 11' c Pollock (2) 15' c, 17' c Walker 44' c Langdon 77' c Con: Hutchinson (5/5) 11', 16', 17', 45', 78' |

Stade Jean-Bouin, Paris
Attendance: 14,878
Referee: Eoghan Cross (Ireland)

11 January 2025
20:00

| (1 BP) Castres (France) | 49–10 | (South Africa) Bulls |
| Try: Palis 17' c Baget (3) 63' c, 73' m, 78' c Dumora 70' c Goodhue 75' c Con: Fernandez (2/2) 18', 64'; Popelin (3/4) 71', 76', 79'; Pen: Fernandez (3/3) 31', 45', 57' | Report | Try: Wessels 6' c Con: Chamberlain (1/1) 7'; Pen: van der Walt (1/1) 53' |

Stade Pierre-Fabre, Castres
Attendance: 9,876
Referee: Matthew Carley (England)

=== Round 4 ===
18 January 2025
13:00

| (1 BP) Bulls (South Africa) | 48–7 | (France) Stade Français |
| Try: Penalty try 2'; Williams 12’ c Papier 17’ c Vermaak 26’ m E. Louw 38’ c Chamberlain 46’ c Hanekom 50’ m Con: Goosen (2/3) 13', 18'; Chamberlain (2/3) 39', 47'; Pen: Chamberlain (1/1) 34' | Report | Try: Macalou 23' c Con: Carbonel (1/1) 24' |

Loftus Versfeld, Pretoria
Attendance: 10,369
Referee: Adam Leal (England)

18 January 2025
15:15

| (1 BP) Northampton Saints (England) | 34–32 | (Ireland) Munster (1 BP) |
| Try: Seabrook (3) 13' m, 48' m, 67' c Langdon 40+1' c Ramm 54' c Con: Smith (3/5) 40+2', 55', 68'; Pen: Smith (1/1) 59' | Report | Try: Nash (2) 22' c, 32' m Kilgallen (2) 63' c, 78' c Con: Crowley (3/4) 23', 64', 79'; Pen: Crowley (2/2) 32', 57' |

cinch Stadium at Franklin's Gardens, Northampton
Attendance: 15,153
Referee: Nika Amashukeli (Georgia)

19 January 2025
15:15

| (1 BP) Saracens (England) | 24–32 | (France) Castres (1 BP) |
| Try: Dan (2) 6' c, 49' m Earl (2) 34' m, 40' c Con: Lozowski (2/4) 7', 40' | Report | Try: Tukino 2' c Séguret (2) 26' c, 64' c Chabouni 53' m Con: Le Brun (3/4) 2', 27', 65'; Pen: Le Brun (2/2) 43', 79' |

StoneX Stadium, London
Attendance: 8,848
Referee: Andrea Piardi (Italy)

== Pool 4 ==
European Rugby Champions Cup Pool 4
| Pos | Team | Pld | W | D | L | PF | PA | PD | TF | TA | TB | LB | Pts | Qualification |
|---|---|---|---|---|---|---|---|---|---|---|---|---|---|---|
| 1 | (France) Toulon (4) | 4 | 3 | 0 | 1 | 94 | 94 | 0 | 12 | 14 | 1 | 0 | 13 | Home Champions Cup round of 16. |
| 2 | (Scotland) Glasgow Warriors (7) | 4 | 2 | 0 | 2 | 103 | 92 | +11 | 16 | 12 | 3 | 1 | 12 | Home Champions Cup round of 16. |
| 3 | (England) Sale Sharks (12) | 4 | 2 | 0 | 2 | 81 | 92 | −11 | 12 | 14 | 2 | 0 | 10 | Away Champions Cup round of 16. |
| 4 | (England) Harlequins (15) | 4 | 2 | 0 | 2 | 110 | 79 | +31 | 16 | 10 | 1 | 0 | 9 | Away Champions Cup round of 16. |
| 5 | (France) Racing 92 (9CC) | 4 | 2 | 0 | 2 | 80 | 92 | −12 | 12 | 14 | 1 | 0 | 9 | Away Challenge Cup round of 16. |
| 6 | (South Africa) Stormers | 4 | 1 | 0 | 3 | 92 | 108 | −16 | 12 | 16 | 1 | 0 | 5 | |

Source: EPCR
Rules for classification: Tiebreakers for teams tied on points: 1) Number of matches won; 2) Difference between points for and against; 3) Total number of points for; 4) Aggregate number of points scored in matches between tied teams; 5) Number of matches won excluding the first match, then the second and so on until the tie is settled.

=== Round 1 ===
7 December 2024
15:15

| Stormers (South Africa) | 14–24 | (France) Toulon |
| Try: Gelant 14' c Dweba 39' c Con: Libbok (2/2) 15', 40' | Report | Try: Villière 4' c Isa 58' c Serin 64' c Con: Serin (3/3) 5', 59', 65'; Pen: Serin (1/1) 11' |

Nelson Mandela Bay Stadium, Gqeberha
Attendance: 23,150
Referee: Karl Dickson (England)

7 December 2024
20:00

| (1 BP) Glasgow Warriors (Scotland) | 38–19 | (England) Sale Sharks |
| Try: Horne (3) 2' c, 12' m, 39' c Rowe 16' c Jones 23' c Cummings 64' m Con: Horne (3/5) 4', 17', 40'; Jordan (1/1) 25' | Report | Try: Penalty try 21'; Reed 26' m Carpenter 61' c Con: R. du Preez (1/2) 62' |

Scotstoun Stadium, Glasgow
Attendance: 6,889
Referee: Andrea Piardi (Italy)

7 December 2024
20:00

| Racing 92 (France) | 23–12 | (England) Harlequins |
| Try: Le Garrec 15' c Naituvi 39' m Spring 61' m Con: Le Garrec (1/3) 16'; Pen: Le Garrec (2/2) 59', 66' | Report | Try: Dombrandt 9' m Porter 43' c Con: Smith (1/2) 44' |

Stade Dominique Duvauchelle, Créteil (Note: Racing 92 relocated their home fixture with Harlequins to the Stade Dominique Duvauchelle, due to the temporary unavailability of the Paris La Défense Arena – the club's usual home ground – following the 2024 Paris Olympics.)
Attendance: 5,497
Referee: Chris Busby (Ireland)

=== Round 2 ===
13 December 2024
20:00

| (1 BP) Sale Sharks (England) | 29–7 | (France) Racing 92 |
| Try: J. du Preez 18' m Roebuck 33' c Carpenter 50' c B. Curry 59' c Con: R. du Preez (3/4) 34', 51', 61'; Pen: R. du Preez (1/1) 66' | Report | Try: Gogichashvili 38' c Con: Le Garrec (1/1) 40' |

Salford Community Stadium, Manchester
Attendance: 6,072
Referee: Craig Evans (Wales)

14 December 2024
20:00

| (1 BP) Harlequins (England) | 53–16 | (South Africa) Stormers |
| Try: Murley (3) 12' m, 64' m, 66' c Care 29' c Dombrandt (3) 36' c, 52' c, 57' m Riley 75' c Con: Smith (3/6) 30', 37', 53'; J. Evans (2/2) 67', 76'; Pen: Smith (1/1) 46' | Report | Try: Mars 78' c Con: Matthee (1/1) 79'; Pen: Matthee (2/2) 2', 8'; Drop: Matthee (1/2) 48' |

Twickenham Stoop, London
Attendance: 10,085
Referee: Ludovic Cayre (France)

15 December 2024
15:15 (Note: The kick-off between Toulon and Glasgow was rescheduled from its original time of 13:00 to a new time of 15:15, to avoid a television broadcasting overlap caused by the rescheduling of the fixture between Stade Français and Saracens.)

| Toulon (France) | 30–29 | (Scotland) Glasgow Warriors (2 BP) |
| Try: Fainga'anuku (2) 5' c, 43' c Alainu'uese 49' c Con: Serin (3/3) 6', 44', 50'; Pen: Domon (2/2) 29', 33'; Serin (1/1) 74' | Report | Try: Penalty try 25'; McKay 35' m Oguntibeju 54' c Matthews 79' c Con: Weir (1/2) 55'; Horne (1/1) 80'; Pen: Weir (1/1) 47' |

Stade Mayol, Toulon
Attendance: 14,410
Referee: Matthew Carley (England)

=== Round 3 ===
10 January 2025
20:00

| (1 BP) Glasgow Warriors (Scotland) | 29–19 | (France) Racing 92 |
| Try: Horne 2' c Dobie 17' m Cancelliere 22' m Tuipulotu 39' m Darge 58' c Con: Horne 2'; Jordan 59' | Report | Try: Habosi 33' c Mazibuko 71' c Tedder 75'm Con: Tedder (2) 33', 72' |

Scotstoun Stadium, Glasgow
Attendance: 7,216
Referee: Karl Dickson (England)

11 January 2025
13:00

| (1 BP) Stormers (South Africa) | 40–0 | (England) Sale Sharks |
| Try: Schickerling 21' c Libbok 25' c Sithole 45' c Gelant 54' m de Wet 63' c Venter 70' c Con: Libbok (4/5) 22', 26', 64', 71'; J.L. du Plessis (1/1) 46' | Report |

DHL Stadium, Cape Town
Attendance: 23,544
Referee: Ludovic Cayre (France)

12 January 2025
13:00

| (1 BP) Toulon (France) | 33–21 | (England) Harlequins |
| Try: Lucchesi 1' c Serin 24' c Abadie 38' m Wainiqolo 40+1' c Dréan 56' c Con: Serin (4/5) 2', 25', 40+2', 57' | Report | Try: Porter 50' c Walker 54' c David 80' c Con: Smith (3/3) 50', 54', 80' |

Stade Mayol, Toulon
Attendance: 15,252
Referee: Andrew Brace (Ireland)

=== Round 4 ===
18 January 2025
20:00

| Harlequins (England) | 24–7 | (Scotland) Glasgow Warriors |
| Try: Cunningham-South 13' c Chisholm 19' c Murley 67' c Con: Smith (3/3) 14', 20', 68'; Pen: Smith (1/1) 25' | Report | Try: Jordan 28' c Con: Jordan (1/1) 29' |

Twickenham Stoop, London
Attendance: 11,802
Referee: Pierre Brousset (France)

18 January 2025
20:00

| (1 BP) Racing 92 (France) | 31–22 | (South Africa) Stormers |
| Try: Habosi (2) 13' c, 36' c Spring (2) 17' m, 55' m Palu 76' c Con: Le Garrec (3/5) 14', 37', 77' | Report | Try: Venter 22' c Jantjies 58' c Theunissen 64' m Con: Matthee (2/3) 22', 59'; Pen: Matthee (1/2) 7' |

Paris La Défense Arena, Nanterre
Attendance: 9,812
Referee: Anthony Woodthorpe (England)

19 January 2025
17:30

| (1 BP) Sale Sharks (England) | 33–7 | (France) Toulon |
| Try: Roebuck (2) 39' c, 74' c B. Curry 49' c Rodd 59' c O'Flaherty 62' m Con: Ford (4/5) 40', 50', 60', 75' | Report | Try: Coulon 66' c Con: Garbisi (1/1) 66' |

Salford Community Stadium, Manchester
Attendance: 7,656
Referee: Gianluca Gnecchi (Italy)
