= 2024–25 EPCR Challenge Cup =

Rugby union competition

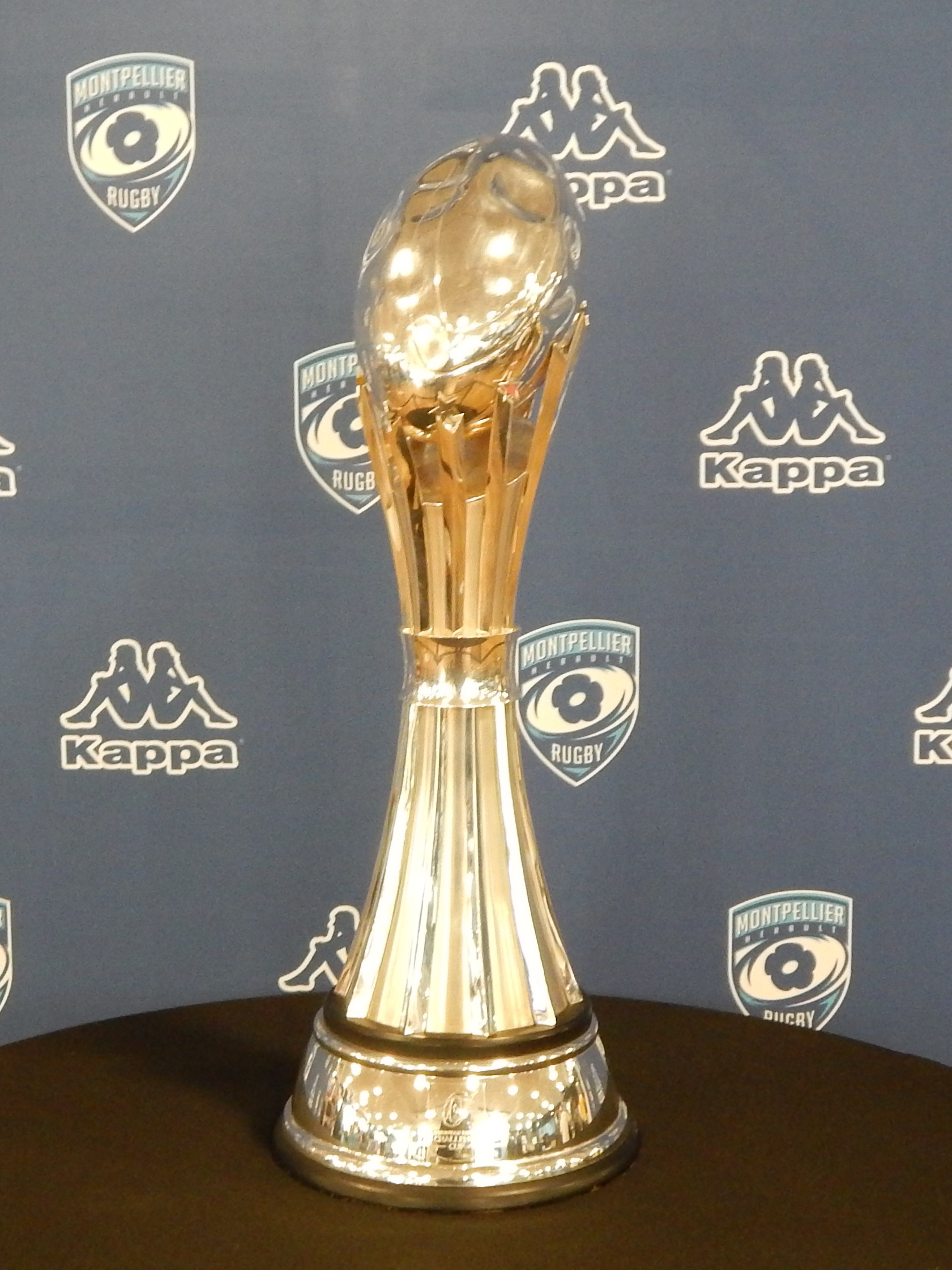
- The EPCR Challenge Cup

Tournament details
- Countries: England; France; Georgia; Ireland; Italy; Scotland; South Africa; Wales
- Date: 6 December 2024 — 23 May 2025

Tournament statistics
- Teams: 22
- Matches played: 51
- Attendance: 377,322 (7,398 per match)
- Highest attendance: 36,705 – Lyon v Bath; 23 May 2025
- Lowest attendance: 1,450 – Zebre v Lyon; 14 December 2024
- Tries scored: 367 (7.2 per match)
- Top point scorer(s): (France) Léo Berdeu (Lyon); 66 points
- Top try scorer(s): (England) Tom Dunn (Bath); 5 tries

Final
- Venue: Millennium Stadium, Cardiff
- Attendance: 36,705
- Champions: (England) Bath (2nd title)
- Runners-up: (France) Lyon

The 2024–25 EPCR Challenge Cup, known colloquially as the 2024-25 European Challenge Cupwas the eleventh edition of the EPCR Challenge Cup, an annual second-tier rugby union competition for professional clubs competing in elite European competition. Including the predecessor competition, the original European Challenge Cup, this is the 29th edition of European club rugby's second-tier competition.

The final was played at the Millennium Stadium, Cardiff, Wales.

The South African Durban-based team, Sharks, were the reigning champions, and qualified for the 2024–25 European Rugby Champions Cup as a consequence. Following the pool stages of that competition, the Sharks dropped back into the knockout phase of the Challenge Cup, becoming at that point the defending champions. The Sharks were eliminated in the Round of 16 by French team, Lyon Olympique.

Bath Rugby defeated Lyon in the final 37-12, to win their second title, and the thirteenth for an English club, a record for one nation and one league.

== Teams ==
Sixteen teams qualified for the 2024–25 EPCR Challenge Cup from Premiership Rugby, the Top 14 and the United Rugby Championship as a direct result of their domestic league performance having not qualified for the Champions Cup. Two further sides received invitations, South Africa's Cheetahs and Georgia's Black Lion.

The distribution of teams are:

- England: two teams
  - Teams in the 2024–25 Premiership season that did not qualify for the 2024–25 Champions Cup.
- France: six teams
  - Teams taking part in the 2024–25 Top 14 season that did not qualify for the 2024–25 Champions Cup.
- Georgia: one team
  - one team, invited, Black Lion
- Ireland, Italy, Scotland, South Africa and Wales: eight teams
  - Eight teams in the 2024–25 United Rugby Championship season that did not qualify for the 2024–25 Champions Cup. This season, these consist of four teams from Wales (Cardiff, Dragons, Ospreys and Scarlets), and a single team each from Ireland (Connacht Rugby), Italy (Zebre Parma), Scotland (Edinburgh) and South Africa (Lions).
- South Africa: one further team
  - One team, invited, the South African team, Cheetahs, playing their home games in the Netherlands.

At the knockout stage, a further four teams entered the competition from the Champions Cup:

- South Africa: two further teams, Bulls and Sharks
- England: 1 further team Bath Rugby
- France: 1 further team Racing 92

Entry Point	Premiership	Top 14	United Rugby Championship					Invited	
—N/a	England	France	Ireland	Italy	Scotland	Wales	South Africa		(Georgia (country)) Georgia
Pool stage	Gloucester; Newcastle Falcons	Bayonne; Lyon; Montpellier; Pau; Perpignan; Vannes	Connacht	Zebre Parma	Edinburgh	Cardiff; Dragons; Ospreys; Scarlets	Lions	Cheetahs	Black Lion
Knockout stage	from 2024–25 European Rugby Champions Cup pool stage								
Knockout stage	Bath Rugby	Racing 92					Bulls; Sharks		

=== Team details ===
Team	Coach / Director of Rugby	Captain	Stadium	Capacity	Method of qualification
Entering at Pool stage
(France) Bayonne	(France) Grégory Patat	(France) Denis Marchois	Stade Jean-Dauger	14,370	Top 14 bottom six (12th)
(Georgia (country)) Black Lion	(England) Richard Cockerill	(Georgia (country)) Luka Matkava	Mikheil Meskhi Stadium	27,223	Invited
(Wales) Cardiff	(England) Matt Sherratt	(Wales) Liam Belcher	Cardiff Arms Park	12,125	URC bottom eight (12th)
(South Africa) Cheetahs	(South Africa) Izak van der Westhuizen	(South Africa) Victor Sekekete	NRCA Stadium, Netherlands	5,000	Invited
(Ireland) Connacht	(England) Peter Wilkins	(Ireland) Cian Prendergast	The Sportsground	8,129	URC bottom eight (11th)
(Wales) Dragons	(New Zealand) Filo Tiatia	(Wales) Ben Carter	Rodney Parade	8,700	URC bottom eight (15th)
(Scotland) Edinburgh	(South Africa) Sean Everitt	(Scotland) Grant Gilchrist (Scotland) Ben Vellacott	Edinburgh Rugby Stadium	7,800	URC bottom eight (10th)
(England) Gloucester	(England) George Skivington	(England) Lewis Ludlow	Kingsholm	16,115	Premiership bottom two (9th)
(South Africa) Lions	(South Africa) Ivan van Rooyen	(South Africa) Marius Louw	Emirates Airline Park	62,567	URC bottom eight (9th)
(France) Lyon	(France) Fabien Gengenbacher	(France) Baptiste Couilloud (Samoa) Jordan Taufua	Stade de Gerland	25,000	Top 14 bottom six (11th)
(France) Montpellier	(France) Joan Caudullo	(France) Alexandre Bécognée (France) Yacouba Camara (France) Arthur Vincent	GGL Stadium	15,697	Top 14 bottom six (13th)
(England) Newcastle Falcons	(England) Steve Diamond	(England) Callum Chick	Kingston Park	11,200	Premiership bottom two (10th)
(Wales) Ospreys	(Wales) Mark Jones (Note: Mark Jones replaced Toby Booth as Ospreys head coach on 17 December 2024.)	(Wales) Jac Morgan	Swansea.com Stadium	20,827	URC bottom eight (8th) (Note: Although Ospreys finished in the URC top eight – which would have qualified them for the 2024–25 Champions Cup – they were displaced by the Sharks, who were the winners of the 2023–24 Challenge Cup.)
(Wales) Scarlets	(Wales) Dwayne Peel	(Wales) Josh Macleod	Parc y Scarlets	14,870	URC bottom eight (13th)
(France) Pau	(France) Sébastien Piqueronies	(New Zealand) Luke Whitelock	Stade du Hameau	18,324	Top 14 bottom six (9th)
(France) Perpignan	(France) Franck Azéma	(France) Mathieu Acebes	Stade Aimé Giral	14,593	Top 14 bottom six (10th)
(France) Vannes	(France) Jean-Noël Spitzer	(France) Clément Payen	Stade de la Rabine	11,303	Pro D2 Champions
(Italy) Zebre Parma	(Italy) Massimo Brunello	(Italy) Danilo Fischetti	Stadio Sergio Lanfranchi	5,000	URC bottom eight (16th)
Entering at Knockout Stage (transferred from Champions Cup)
(England) Bath	(South Africa) Johann van Graan	(England) Ben Spencer	Recreation Ground	14,509	Champions Cup Pool 2 5th place
(South Africa) Bulls	(South Africa) Jake White	(South Africa) Marcell Coetzee	Loftus Versfeld	51,762	Champions Cup Pool 3 5th place
(France) Racing 92	(France) Patrice Collazo (Note: Patrice Collazo replaced Stuart Lancaster as Racing 92 head coach on 1 February 2025.)	(France) Henry Chavancy	París La Défense Arena	30,680	Champions Cup Pool 4 5th place
(South Africa) Sharks	(New Zealand) John Plumtree	(South Africa) Lukhanyo Am	Hollywoodbets Kings Park	52,000	Champions Cup Pool 1 5th place

== Pool stage ==
Teams were drawn into pools on 2 July in Cardiff. Teams were awarded four points for a win, two for a draw, one for scoring four tries in a game, and one for losing by less than eight points.

=== Pool 1 ===
EPCR Challenge Cup Pool 1
Pos	Team	Pld	W	D	L	PF	PA	PD	TF	TA	TB	LB	Pts	Qualification
1	(Ireland) Connacht (1)	4	4	0	0	154	73	+81	25	10	4	0	20	Home round of 16
2	(France) Lyon (5)	4	3	0	1	150	118	+32	21	19	2	0	14	Home round of 16
3	(France) Perpignan (8)	4	2	1	1	100	92	+8	12	14	1	0	11	Home round of 16
4	(Wales) Cardiff (16)	4	1	0	3	91	98	−7	13	13	2	1	7	Away round of 16
5	(South Africa) Cheetahs	4	1	1	2	73	132	−59	10	19	0	0	6	
6	(Italy) Zebre Parma	4	0	0	4	70	125	−55	10	17	0	2	2	

Source: EPCR
Rules for classification: Tiebreakers for teams tied on points: 1) Number of matches won; 2) Difference between points for and against; 3) Total number of points for; 4) Aggregate number of points scored in matches between tied teams; 5) Number of matches won excluding the first match, then the second and so on until the tie is settled.

=== Pool 2 ===
EPCR Challenge Cup Pool 2
Pos	Team	Pld	W	D	L	PF	PA	PD	TF	TA	TB	LB	Pts	Qualification
1	(France) Montpellier (2)	4	4	0	0	131	41	+90	19	6	3	0	19	Home round of 16
2	(Wales) Ospreys (4)	4	3	0	1	111	116	−5	16	17	3	0	15	Home round of 16
3	(France) Pau (7)	4	2	0	2	119	108	+11	10	10	3	1	12	Home round of 16
4	(South Africa) Lions (14)	4	2	0	2	122	103	+19	18	13	2	0	10	Away round of 16
5	(Wales) Dragons	4	1	0	3	61	116	−55	8	15	0	1	5	
6	(England) Newcastle Falcons	4	0	0	4	55	115	−60	8	16	0	0	0	

Source: EPCR
Rules for classification: Tiebreakers for teams tied on points: 1) Number of matches won; 2) Difference between points for and against; 3) Total number of points for; 4) Aggregate number of points scored in matches between tied teams; 5) Number of matches won excluding the first match, then the second and so on until the tie is settled.

=== Pool 3 ===
EPCR Challenge Cup Pool 3
Pos	Team	Pld	W	D	L	PF	PA	PD	TF	TA	TB	LB	Pts	Qualification
1	(Scotland) Edinburgh (3)	4	3	0	1	127	67	+60	18	9	3	1	16	Home round of 16
2	(France) Bayonne (6)	4	3	0	1	125	101	+24	18	12	2	0	14	Home round of 16
3	(Wales) Scarlets (13)	4	2	0	2	97	94	+3	13	13	2	1	11	Away round of 16
4	(England) Gloucester (15)	4	2	0	2	82	115	−33	12	16	1	0	9	Away round of 16
5	(France) Vannes	4	1	0	3	115	108	+7	14	14	2	2	8	
6	(Georgia (country)) Black Lion	4	1	0	3	71	132	−61	6	17	0	0	4	

Source: EPCR
Rules for classification: Tiebreakers for teams tied on points: 1) Number of matches won; 2) Difference between points for and against; 3) Total number of points for; 4) Aggregate number of points scored in matches between tied teams; 5) Number of matches won excluding the first match, then the second and so on until the tie is settled.

== Knockout stage ==
The knockout stage begins with a single-leg round of 16 matches, consisting of the top 4 teams from each pool, and the teams ranked 5th in each pool of the 2024–25 European Rugby Champions Cup. The round of 16 follows a pre-determined format, while the quarter-finals and semi-finals guarantee home advantage to the higher-ranked team.

=== Seeding ===
Rank	Team	Pts	Diff	TF
Pool leaders
1	(Ireland) Connacht	20	+81	25
2	(France) Montpellier	19	+90	19
3	(Scotland) Edinburgh	16	+60	18
Pool runners-up
4	(Wales) Ospreys	15	–5	16
5	(France) Lyon	14	+32	21
6	(France) Bayonne	14	+24	18
Top two third placed teams
7	(France) Pau	12	+11	10
8	(France) Perpignan	11	+8	12
Champions Cup teams
9	(France) Racing 92	9	−12	12
10	(England) Bath Rugby	7	−12	14
11	(South Africa) Bulls	5	−29	12
12	(South Africa) Sharks	5	−87	10
Third best third placed team
13	(Wales) Scarlets	11	+3	13
Fourth placed teams
14	(South Africa) Lions	10	+19	13
15	(England) Gloucester	9	−33	12
16	(Wales) Cardiff	7	−7	13

=== Bracket ===
Round of 16
3	(Scotland) Edinburgh	24
14	(South Africa) Lions	12
6	(France) Bayonne	22
11	(South Africa) Bulls	32
7	(France) Pau	24
10	(England) Bath Rugby	49
2	(France) Montpellier	17
15	(England) Gloucester	24
4	(Wales) Ospreys	36
13	(Wales) Scarlets	14
5	(France) Lyon	34
12	(South Africa) Sharks	21
1	(Ireland) Connacht	35
16	(Wales) Cardiff	20
8	(France) Perpignan	18
9	(France) Racing 92	24

Quarter-finals
3	(Scotland) Edinburgh	34
11	(South Africa) Bulls	28
10	(England) Bath Rugby	61
15	(England) Gloucester	26
4	(Wales) Ospreys	18
5	(France) Lyon	20
1	(Ireland) Connacht	40
9	(France) Racing 92	43

Semi-finals
3	(Scotland) Edinburgh	24
10	(England) Bath Rugby	39
5	(France) Lyon	29
9	(France) Racing 92	15

Final
10	(England) Bath Rugby	37
5	(France) Lyon	12

=== Round of 16 ===
4 April 2025
20:00

Edinburgh (Scotland) (3)	24–12	(14) (South Africa) Lions
Try: Goosen 1' m Vellacott 9' m Ritchie 28' c Price 71' c Con: Thompson (2/4) 29', 72'	Report	Try: Horn 46' m Visagie 75' c Con: Steyn (1/1) 76'

Edinburgh Rugby Stadium, Edinburgh
Attendance: 5,407
Referee: Ludovic Cayre (France)

4 April 2025
21:00

Pau (France) (7)	24–49	(10) (England) Bath Rugby
Try: C. Tuipulotu 26' c Brau-Boirie (2) 61' c, 68' c Con: Desperes (3/3) 27', 62', 69'; Pen: Desperes (1/1) 19'	Report	Try: Muir 1' c Cokansiga 21' c Obano 29' c Bayliss 34' c Dunn 42' c McConnochie 56' c Reid 71' c Con: Donoghue (7/7) 2', 22', 30' 35', 43', 57', 72'

Stade du Hameau, Pau
Attendance: 6,816
Referee: Hollie Davidson (Scotland)

5 April 2025
13:30

Bayonne (France) (6)	22–32	(11) (South Africa) Bulls
Try: Mori 32' m Bourdeau 48' c Spring 75' c Con: Spring (1/1) 49'; Tiberghien (1/1) 76'; Pen: Germain (1/1) 5'	Report	Try: Petersen 15' m Ludwig 38' c Kriel 44' c van Staden 67' c Con: Johannes (2/3) 39', 45'; Goosen (1/1); Pen: Johannes (1/1) 14'; Goosen (1/1) 80'

Stade Jean-Dauger, Bayonne
Attendance: 10,675
Referee: Christophe Ridley (England)

5 April 2025
18:30

Montpellier (France) (2)	17–24	(15) (England) Gloucester
Try: Bouthier 4' c Reus 9' c Con: Reus (2/2) 5', 10'; Pen: Reus (1/1) 40'	Report	Try: F. Thomas 25' c Jordan 33' c Ackermann 57' c Con: Carreras (3/3) 26', 34', 57'; Pen: Carreras (1/1) 80'

GGL Stadium, Montpellier
Attendance: 5,579
Referee: Morné Ferreira (South Africa)

5 April 2025
20:00

Connacht (Ireland) (1)	35–20	(16) (Wales) Cardiff
Try: Divine 2' c Jansen 40+4' c Treacy 44' c Bolton 66' c Boyle, 76' c Con: Hanrahan (3/3) 4', 45', 42'; Ioane (2/2) 66', 77'	Report	Try: Lee-Lo 37' m B. Thomas 53' c Adams 60' m Con: B. Thomas (1/3) 54'; Pen: Sheedy (1/2) 12'

The Sportsground, Galway
Attendance: 4,217
Referee: Luc Ramos (France)

5 April 2025
21:00

Perpignan (France) (8)	18–24	(9) (France) Racing 92
Try: Allan 35' m Veredamu 53' c Con: Allan (1/1) 54'; Pen: Allan (2/2) 13', 17'	Report	Try: Bamba 23' c Joseph 41' c Naituvi 65'; Con: Farrell (1/1) 24'; Gibert (1/1) 42'; Le Garrec (1/1) 66'; Pen: Farrell (1/1) 8'

Stade Aimé Giral, Perpignan
Attendance: 9,816
Referee: Gianluca Gnecchi (Italy)

6 April 2025
17:30

Ospreys (Wales) (4)	36–14	(13) (Wales) Scarlets
Try: Beard 1' c J. Morgan 4' m R. Davies 28' c Lake 38' c Walsh 52' m Kasende 61' m Con: D. Edwards (3/6) 2', 29', 39'	Report	Try: Murray 10' c James 71' c Con: Lloyd (2/2) 11', 71'

Swansea.com Stadium, Swansea
Attendance: 9,057
Referee: Matthew Carley (England)

6 April 2025
18:30

Lyon (France) (5)	34–21	(12) (South Africa) Sharks
Try: Tchaptchet 16' m William 20' c Charcosset 27' c Maraku 37' m Rattez 67' c Con: Berdeu (2/4) 21', 28'; Méliande (1/1) 67'; Pen: Berdeu (1/1) 7'	Report	Try: Mbatha 4' c Rahl 69' c Mavesere 79' c Con: Masuku (1/1) 5'; Smith (2/2) 70', 80'

Stade de Gerland, Lyon
Attendance: 10,475
Referee: Federico Vedovelli (Italy)

=== Quarter-finals ===
12 April 2025
12:30

Edinburgh (Scotland) (3)	34–28	(11) (South Africa) Bulls
Try: Lang (2) 3' c, 24' c Bradbury 13' c Gilchrist 42' c Con: Thompson (4/4) 4', 14', 25', 43'; Pen: Thompson (2/2) 37', 59'	Report	Try: Kriel (2) 16' c, 76' c Penalty try 46'; Hanekom 49' c Con: Johannes (1/1) 17'; Goosen (2/2) 50', 76'

Edinburgh Rugby Stadium, Edinburgh
Attendance: 4,737
Referee: Pierre Brousset (France)

12 April 2025
17:30

Ospreys (Wales) (4)	18–20	(5) (France) Lyon
Try: J. Morgan 25' c McGuigan 70' m Con: Edwards (1/2) 26'; Pen: Edwards (2/2) 19', 54'	Report	Try: Rattez 6' c Guillard 50' c Con: Berdeu (2/2) 7', 51'; Pen: Berdeu (2/2) 21', 34'

Swansea.com Stadium, Swansea
Attendance: 3,723
Referee: Andrew Brace (Ireland)

12 April 2025
20:00

Connacht (Ireland) (1)	40–43	(9) (France) Racing 92
Try: Aki 2' c C. Prendergast (2) 8' c, 29' c Penalty try 12'; Murphy 72' m Forde 78' c Con: Hanrahan (4/5) 3', 9', 30', 79'	Report	Try: Naituvi 5' m Escobar 18' m Le Garrec (2) 24' c, 48' c Tuisova 33' c Con: Lancaster (2/4) 25', 33'; Le Garrec (1/1) 49'; Pen: Lancaster (1/2) 42'; Le Garrec (2/3) 56', 64'; Drop: Farrell (1/1) 53'

The Sportsground, Galway
Attendance: 6,217
Referee: Christophe Ridley (England)

13 April 2025
17:30

Bath (England) (10)	61–26	(15) (England) Gloucester
Try: de Glanville 3' c Dunn 10' m Griffin 14' c Spencer 29' c Barbeary (2) 38' c, 50' c Coetzee 65' c Hill 70' c Carr-Smith 78' c Con: Russell (8/9) 4', 15', 29', 39', 51', 66', 71', 79'	Report	Try: Carreras 6' c Singleton 22' c Morris 36' m Ludlow 73' c Con: Carreras (3/4) 7', 22', 73'

The Rec, Bath
Attendance: 9,445
Referee: Sam Grove-White (Scotland)

=== Semi-finals ===
3 May 2025
15:00

Edinburgh (Scotland) (3)	24–39	(10) (England) Bath
Try: Tuipulotu 18' c Penalty try 42'; Price 64' c Con: Thompson (2/2) 19', 65'; Pen: Thompson (1/2) 37'	Report	Try: Underhill 8' c Dunn (2) 30' m, 53' c Barbeary 59' m Annett 75' c Pepper 78' m Con: Russell (3/6) 9', 54', 76'; Pen: Russell (1/1) 63'

Edinburgh Rugby Stadium, Edinburgh
Attendance: 7,989
Referee: Nika Amashukeli (Georgia)

4 May 2025
13:30

Lyon (France) (5)	29–15	(9) (France) Racing 92
Try: Rattez 27' c Saghinadze 50' c Con: Berdeu (2/2) 28', 51'; Pen: Berdeu (5/7) 24', 47', 62', 67', 72'	Report	Try: Escobar 35' m Labarbe 54' c Con: Tedder (1/2) 55'; Pen: Tedder (1/2) 22'

Stade de Gerland, Lyon
Attendance: 13,205
Referee: Karl Dickson (England)

=== Final ===
23 May 2025
20:00

Bath (England) (10)	37–12	(5) (France) Lyon
Try: Dunn 18' c Ojomoh 24' c Obano 50' c Spencer 62' c Con: Russell (4/4) 20', 24', 51', 63'; Pen: Russell (3/3) 8', 42', 71'	Report	Try: Dumortier 3' m Botha 44' c Con: Berdeu (1/2) 44'

Principality Stadium, Cardiff
Attendance: 36,705
Referee: Hollie Davidson (Scotland)

Team details

FB	15	(England) Tom de Glanville		(substituted off) 73'
RW	14	(England) Joe Cokanasiga
OC	13	(England) Max Ojomoh
IC	12	(England) Will Butt
LW	11	(England) Will Muir	(yellow card) 34'
FH	10	(Scotland) Finn Russell
SH	9	(England) Ben Spencer (c)		(substituted off) 70'
N8	8	(England) Miles Reid		(substituted off) 50'
OF	7	(England) Sam Underhill	(yellow card) 28'
BF	6	(England) Ted Hill		(substituted off) 50'
RL	5	(England) Charlie Ewels		(substituted off) 70'
LL	4	(Ireland) Quinn Roux
TP	3	(England) Will Stuart		(substituted off) 50'
HK	2	(England) Tom Dunn		(substituted off) 60'
LP	1	(England) Beno Obano		(substituted off) 60'
Substitutions:
HK	16	(Ireland) Niall Annett		(substituted on) 60'
PR	17	(South Africa) Francois van Wyk		(substituted on) 60'
PR	18	(South Africa) Thomas du Toit		(substituted on) 50'
LK	19	(Ireland) Ross Molony		(substituted on) 70'
BR	20	(England) Guy Pepper		(substituted on) 50'
SH	21	(England) Tom Carr-Smith		(substituted on) 70'
FH	22	(England) Ciaran Donoghue		(substituted on) 73'
BR	23	(England) Alfie Barbeary		(substituted on) 50'
Coach:
(South Africa) Johann van Graan

FB	15	(Georgia (country)) Davit Niniashvili	(substituted off) 70'
RW	14	(France) Vincent Rattez
OC	13	(New Zealand) Josiah Maraku
IC	12	(France) Théo Millet
LW	11	(France) Ethan Dumortier
FH	10	(France) Léo Berdeu	(substituted off) 70'
SH	9	(France) Baptiste Couilloud (c)
N8	8	(South Africa) Arno Botha	(substituted off) 54'
OF	7	(Georgia (country)) Beka Saghinadze	(substituted off) 58'
BF	6	(France) Dylan Cretin	(substituted off) 64'
RL	5	(France) Mickaël Guillard
LL	4	(France) Théo William
TP	3	(New Zealand) Jermaine Ainsley	(substituted off) 54'
HK	2	(France) Camille Chat	(substituted off) 54'
LP	1	(France) Jérôme Rey	(substituted off) 60'
Substitutions:
HK	16	(France) Guillaume Marchand	(substituted on) 54'
PR	17	(France) Hamza Kaabeche	(substituted on) 60'
PR	18	(Georgia (country)) Irakli Aptsiauri	(substituted on) 54'
LK	19	(France) Félix Lambey	(substituted on) 64'
BR	20	(New Zealand) Liam Allen	(substituted on) 58'
BR	21	(France) Maxime Gouzou	(substituted on) 54'
SH	22	(Italy) Martin Page-Relo	(substituted on) 70'
FH	23	(France) Martin Méliande	(substituted on) 70'
Coach:
(France) Karim Ghezal

Player of the Match:
(England) Ben Spencer (Bath)
Assistant referees:
Gianluca Gnecchi (Italy)
Eoghan Cross (Ireland) / Ben Breakspear (Wales) (Note: Breakspear replaced Cross as Assistant referee in the second half.)
Television match official:
Mike Adamson (Scotland)

== Leading scorers ==
Note: Flags to the left of player names indicate national team as has been defined under World Rugby eligibility rules, or primary nationality for players who have not yet earned international senior caps. Players may hold one or more non-WR nationalities.

=== Most points ===
As of 23 May 2025

Rank	Player	Club	Points
1	(France) Léo Berdeu	(France) Lyon	66
2	(France) Axel Desperes	(France) Pau	61
3	(Wales) Dan Edwards	(Wales) Ospreys	45
4	(Scotland) Finn Russell	(England) Bath	42
5	(Georgia (country)) Luka Matkava	(Georgia (country)) Black Lion	39

=== Most tries ===
As of 23 May 2025

Rank	Player	Club	Tries
1	(England) Tom Dunn	(England) Bath	5
2	(Wales) Josh Adams	(Wales) Cardiff	4
2	(New Zealand) Wes Goosen	(Scotland) Edinburgh	4
2	(Scotland) Ali Price	(Scotland) Edinburgh	4
2	(Wales) Josh Macleod	(Wales) Scarlets	4
2	(Wales) Jac Morgan	(Wales) Ospreys	4
2	(Ireland) Paul Boyle	(Ireland) Connacht	4
2	(Ireland) Chay Mullins	(Ireland) Connacht	4
2	(Ireland) Ben Murphy	(Ireland) Connacht	4

== Discipline ==
=== Citings/bans ===
Player	Match (Note: The cited player's club is listed in bold italics.)	Citing date	Law breached	Result	Refs
(Italy) Alessandro Fusco	(Italy) **Zebre Parma** vs. (France) Lyon (Round 2 – 14 December 2024)	18 December 2024	9.18 – Tip Tackle (Red card)	3-match ban	
(Georgia (country)) Lado Chachanidze	(Georgia (country)) **Black Lion** vs. (Wales) Scarlets (Round 2 – 15 December 2024)	18 December 2024	9.18 – Tip Tackle (Red card)	Red card rescinded	
(Georgia (country)) Giorgi Tsutskiridze	(Georgia (country)) **Black Lion** vs. (Wales) Scarlets (Round 2 – 15 December 2024)	18 December 2024	9.28 – Match Official Abuse (Citing)	2-match ban	
(Georgia (country)) Giorgi Sinauridze	(Georgia (country)) **Black Lion** vs. (France) Bayonne (Round 3 – 11 January 2025)	14 January 2025	9.20(d) – Dangerous Play in a Ruck (Citing)	1-match ban	
(Scotland) Magnus Bradbury	(Scotland) **Edinburgh** vs. (Georgia (country)) Black Lion (Round 4 – 19 January 2025)	22 January 2025	9.13 – Dangerous Tackling (Red card)	3-match ban (Note: The ban is reduced by one match, subject to the player's completion of the World Rugby Coaching Intervention Programme.)	
(England) Sam Underhill	(France) Pau vs. (England) **Bath** (Round of 16 – 4 April 2025)	7 April 2025	9.13 – Dangerous Tackling (Red card)	3-match ban	
