= 2024–25 European Rugby Champions Cup =

Rugby union competition

Tournament details
- Countries: England; France; Ireland; Italy; Scotland; South Africa
- Tournament format(s): Modified round-robin and knockout
- Date: 6 December 2024 – 24 May 2025

Tournament statistics
- Teams: 24
- Matches played: 63
- Attendance: 1,142,553 (18,136 per match)
- Highest attendance: 70,225 – Bordeaux Bègles v Northampton Saints; 24 May 2025
- Lowest attendance: 4,642 – Benetton v Bath; 15 December 2024
- Tries scored: 486 (7.71 per match)
- Top point scorer(s): (France) Thomas Ramos (Toulouse); 87 points
- Top try scorer(s): (France) Damian Penaud (Bordeaux Bègles); 14 tries

Final
- Venue: Millennium Stadium, Cardiff, Wales
- Attendance: 70,225
- Champions: Bordeaux Bègles (1st title)
- Runners-up: Northampton Saints

The 2024–25 European Rugby Champions Cup (known as the 2024–25 Investec Champions Cup for sponsorship reasons) was the eleventh season of the European Rugby Champions Cup, the annual club rugby union competition run by European Professional Club Rugby (EPCR) for professional clubs. It was the 30th season of the pan-European professional club rugby competition and the second season in which Investec are named as title sponsors.

For the first time since its 1995 founding (as the Heineken Cup), no Welsh teams are playing in the ERCC, as none of them finished in the top seven of the 2023–24 United Rugby Championship. The final will be played at the Millennium Stadium in Cardiff, Wales.

Toulouse entered the competition as defending champions, seeking a record-extending seventh title, but fell in the semi final to French rivals Bordeaux Bègles. Leinster, beaten finalists in the past three editions, sought a record fourth consecutive final, and to become the second team after Toulouse to win a fifth Champions Cup, but lost to English champions and former European champions Northampton Saints, also in the semi-final.

Bordeaux Bègles won the final, beating Northampton Saints 28–20 for their first title.

== Teams ==
Twenty-four clubs from the three major European domestic and regional leagues qualified for the 2024–25 edition of the Champions Cup.

The distribution of teams was:

- England: eight clubs
  - The top eight clubs from the 2023–24 Premiership.
- France: eight clubs
  - The top eight clubs from the 2023–24 Top 14. The European champions, Toulouse qualified in the top eight of the French league.
- Ireland, Italy, Scotland and South Africa: eight clubs
  - The top seven sides from the 2023–24 United Rugby Championship.
  - The champions of the 2023–24 Challenge Cup (Sharks), who displaced the eighth-placed side in the URC (Ospreys) to take the final qualification spot.

Premiership	Top 14	United Rugby Championship			
England	France	Ireland	Italy	Scotland	South Africa
Bath; Bristol Bears; Exeter Chiefs; Harlequins; Leicester Tigers; Northampton Saints; Sale Sharks; Saracens	Bordeaux Bègles; Castres; Clermont; La Rochelle; Racing 92; Stade Français; Toulon; Toulouse	Leinster; Munster; Ulster	Benetton	Glasgow Warriors	Bulls; Sharks; Stormers

=== Team details ===
Below is the list of coaches, captain and stadiums with their method of qualification for each team.

Note: Placing shown in brackets, denotes standing at the end of the regular season for their respective leagues, with their end of season positioning shown through CH for Champions, RU for Runner-up, SF for losing Semi-finalist, and QF for losing Quarter-finalist.

Team	Coach(es)/ Director of Rugby	Captain(s)	Stadium	Capacity	Method of qualification
(England) Bath	(South Africa) Johann van Graan	(England) Ben Spencer	Recreation Ground	14,509	Premiership top 8 (2nd) (RU)
(Italy) Benetton	(Italy) Marco Bortolami	(Italy) Michele Lamaro	Stadio Comunale di Monigo	5,000	URC top 8 (7th) (QF)
(France) Bordeaux Bègles	(France) Yannick Bru	(France) Jefferson Poirot	Stade Chaban-Delmas	34,694	Top 14 top 8 (3rd) (RU)
(England) Bristol Bears	(Samoa) Pat Lam	(England) Fitz Harding	Ashton Gate	27,000	Premiership top 8 (5th)
(South Africa) Bulls	(South Africa) Jake White	(South Africa) Marcell Coetzee	Loftus Versfeld	51,762	URC top 8 (2nd) (RU)
(France) Castres	(Ireland) Jeremy Davidson	(France) Mathieu Babillot	Stade Pierre-Fabre	12,500	Top 14 top 8 (7th)
(France) Clermont	(France) Christophe Urios	(France) Baptiste Jauneau	Stade Marcel-Michelin	19,022	Top 14 top 8 (8th)
(England) Exeter Chiefs	(England) Rob Baxter	(Wales) Dafydd Jenkins	Sandy Park	13,593	Premiership top 8 (7th)
(Scotland) Glasgow Warriors	(South Africa) Franco Smith	(Scotland) Kyle Steyn	Scotstoun Stadium	7,351	URC top 8 (4th) (CH)
(England) Harlequins	(Australia) Billy Millard	(England) Alex Dombrandt	Twickenham Stoop	14,800	Premiership top 8 (6th)
(France) La Rochelle	(Ireland) Ronan O'Gara	(France) Grégory Alldritt	Stade Marcel-Deflandre	16,700	Top 14 top 8 (5th) (SF)
(England) Leicester Tigers	(Australia) Michael Cheika	(Argentina) Julián Montoya	Welford Road Stadium	25,849	Premiership top 8 (8th)
(Ireland) Leinster	(Ireland) Leo Cullen	(Ireland) Caelan Doris	Aviva Stadium	51,700	URC top 8 (3rd) (SF)
(Ireland) Munster	(Ireland) Ian Costello	(Ireland) Tadhg Beirne	Thomond Park	25,600	URC top 8 (1st) (SF)
(England) Northampton Saints	(England) Phil Dowson	(England) George Furbank	Franklin's Gardens	15,200	Premiership top 8 (1st) (CH)
(France) Racing 92	(England) Stuart Lancaster	(France) Henry Chavancy	Paris La Défense Arena	32,000	Top 14 top 8 (6th) (QF)
(England) Sale Sharks	(England) Alex Sanderson	(England) Ben Curry	Salford Community Stadium	12,000	Premiership top 8 (3rd) (SF)
(England) Saracens	(Ireland) Mark McCall	(England) Maro Itoje	StoneX Stadium	10,500	Premiership top 8 (4th) (SF)
(South Africa) Sharks	(New Zealand) John Plumtree	(South Africa) Lukhanyo Am	Kings Park Stadium	52,000	Challenge Cup Champions
(France) Stade Français	(France) Laurent Labit	(France) Paul Gabrillagues	Stade Jean-Bouin	20,000	Top 14 top 8 (2nd) (SF)
(South Africa) Stormers	(South Africa) John Dobson	(South Africa) Salmaan Moerat	Cape Town Stadium	55,000	URC top 8 (5th) (QF)
(France) Toulon	(France) Pierre Mignoni	(France) Charles Ollivon	Stade Mayol	17,500	Top 14 top 8 (4th) (QF)
(France) Toulouse	(France) Ugo Mola	(France) Antoine Dupont	Stade Ernest-Wallon	19,500	Top 14 top 8 (1st) (CH)
(Ireland) Ulster	(Ireland) Richie Murphy	(Ireland) Iain Henderson	Ravenhill Stadium	18,196	URC top 8 (6th) (QF)

== Pool stage ==
Teams were drawn into pools in Cardiff on 2 July 2024. Teams are awarded four points for a win, two for a draw, one for scoring four tries in a game, and one for losing by less than eight points.

The format is, once again, a modified round robin. Each pool consists of six teams, two from each of the three contributing leagues. Each team plays the four teams not from its own league once, with one game away to each league and one game at home. Teams do not play their league partners at this stage. The top four teams go to the first knock out round, where the top two teams in each group are given home advantage. The fifth placed teams 'drop' into the Challenge Cup knockout rounds, joining twelve clubs from that competition's pool stages in the knockout stage as the ninth to twelfth seeds, earning away ties with the fifth-to eighth-ranked sides from the Challenge Cup's pool stage. The sixth placed team in each group is eliminated.

Locations
Locations of the Europe-based teams of the 2024–25 European Rugby Champions Cup group stage.
Red: Pool 1; Blue: Pool 2; Green: Pool 3; Yellow: Pool 4.
Locations of London teams of the 2024–25 European Rugby Champions Cup group stage.
Green: Pool 3; Yellow: Pool 4.
Locations of South African teams of the 2024–25 European Rugby Champions Cup group stage.
Red: Pool 1; Green: Pool 3; Yellow: Pool 4.

=== Pool 1 ===
European Rugby Champions Cup Pool 1
Pos	Team	Pld	W	D	L	PF	PA	PD	TF	TA	TB	LB	Pts	Qualification
1	(France) Bordeaux Bègles (1)	4	4	0	0	217	76	+141	33	12	4	0	20	Home Champions Cup round of 16.
2	(France) Toulouse (5)	4	4	0	0	225	62	+163	33	9	3	0	19	Home Champions Cup round of 16.
3	(England) Leicester Tigers (10)	4	2	0	2	134	149	−15	20	21	3	0	11	Away Champions Cup round of 16.
4	(Ireland) Ulster (16)	4	1	0	3	102	163	−61	15	24	1	0	5	Away Champions Cup round of 16.
5	(South Africa) Sharks (12CC)	4	1	0	3	76	163	−87	10	23	1	0	5	Away Challenge Cup round of 16.
6	(England) Exeter Chiefs	4	0	0	4	83	224	−141	13	34	1	0	1	

Source: EPCR
Rules for classification: Tiebreakers for teams tied on points: 1) Number of matches won; 2) Difference between points for and against; 3) Total number of points for; 4) Aggregate number of points scored in matches between tied teams; 5) Number of matches won excluding the first match, then the second and so on until the tie is settled.

=== Pool 2 ===
European Rugby Champions Cup Pool 2
Pos	Team	Pld	W	D	L	PF	PA	PD	TF	TA	TB	LB	Pts	Qualification
1	(Ireland) Leinster (2)	4	4	0	0	113	54	+59	15	7	2	0	18	Home Champions Cup round of 16.
2	(France) La Rochelle (8)	4	2	0	2	98	75	+23	12	6	1	2	11	Home Champions Cup round of 16.
3	(Italy) Benetton (11)	4	2	0	2	83	109	−26	11	14	2	1	11	Away Champions Cup round of 16.
4	(France) Clermont (14)	4	2	0	2	89	81	+8	13	12	2	0	10	Away Champions Cup round of 16.
5	(England) Bath (10CC)	4	1	0	3	102	114	−12	14	16	1	2	7	Away Challenge Cup round of 16.
6	(England) Bristol Bears	4	1	0	3	80	132	−52	12	20	2	1	7	

Source: EPCR
Rules for classification: Tiebreakers for teams tied on points: 1) Number of matches won; 2) Difference between points for and against; 3) Total number of points for; 4) Aggregate number of points scored in matches between tied teams; 5) Number of matches won excluding the first match, then the second and so on until the tie is settled.

=== Pool 3 ===
European Rugby Champions Cup Pool 3
Pos	Team	Pld	W	D	L	PF	PA	PD	TF	TA	TB	LB	Pts	Qualification
1	(England) Northampton Saints (3)	4	3	0	1	137	106	+31	20	15	4	0	16	Home Champions Cup round of 16.
2	(France) Castres (6)	4	3	0	1	105	86	+19	13	13	2	0	14	Home Champions Cup round of 16.
3	(Ireland) Munster (9)	4	2	0	2	96	69	+27	13	7	2	2	12	Away Champions Cup round of 16.
4	(England) Saracens (13)	4	2	0	2	91	71	+20	11	9	2	1	11	Away Champions Cup round of 16.
5	(South Africa) Bulls (11CC)	4	1	0	3	84	113	−29	12	15	1	0	5	Away Challenge Cup round of 16.
6	(France) Stade Français	4	1	0	3	76	144	−68	11	21	1	0	5	

Source: EPCR
Rules for classification: Tiebreakers for teams tied on points: 1) Number of matches won; 2) Difference between points for and against; 3) Total number of points for; 4) Aggregate number of points scored in matches between tied teams; 5) Number of matches won excluding the first match, then the second and so on until the tie is settled.

=== Pool 4 ===
European Rugby Champions Cup Pool 4
Pos	Team	Pld	W	D	L	PF	PA	PD	TF	TA	TB	LB	Pts	Qualification
1	(France) Toulon (4)	4	3	0	1	94	94	0	12	14	1	0	13	Home Champions Cup round of 16.
2	(Scotland) Glasgow Warriors (7)	4	2	0	2	103	92	+11	16	12	3	1	12	Home Champions Cup round of 16.
3	(England) Sale Sharks (12)	4	2	0	2	81	92	−11	12	14	2	0	10	Away Champions Cup round of 16.
4	(England) Harlequins (15)	4	2	0	2	110	79	+31	16	10	1	0	9	Away Champions Cup round of 16.
5	(France) Racing 92 (9CC)	4	2	0	2	80	92	−12	12	14	1	0	9	Away Challenge Cup round of 16.
6	(South Africa) Stormers	4	1	0	3	92	108	−16	12	16	1	0	5	

Source: EPCR
Rules for classification: Tiebreakers for teams tied on points: 1) Number of matches won; 2) Difference between points for and against; 3) Total number of points for; 4) Aggregate number of points scored in matches between tied teams; 5) Number of matches won excluding the first match, then the second and so on until the tie is settled.

== Knockout stage ==
The knockout stage follows the same format as used in previous years, which begins with a single-leg round of 16, starting on 4 April 2025. This round is followed by the quarter-finals and semi-finals, before the tournament concludes with the final at the Millennium Stadium in Cardiff on 24 May 2025.

All clubs are thereafter ranked in descending order, based firstly on their ranking in their pool, and subsequently on the number of competition points they have accumulated, to create an overall ranking from 1 to 16. The pool winners are ranked 1 to 4, the second-placed clubs are ranked 5 to 8, the third-placed clubs are ranked 9 to 12, and the fourth-placed clubs are ranked 13 to 16.

Whilst the round of 16 follows a pre-determined format, the quarter-finals see home advantage given to the higher ranked team, based on a pre-determined match-up. As such the teams seeded 1 to 4 are guaranteed home advantage in they reach the quarter-final, and teams seeded 13 to 16 are guaranteed an away fixture if they do so. Whether a team ranked from 5 to 12 will play home or away will depend on other results in their section of the bracket.

At the semi-final stage, the higher ranked team has 'home country' advantage, with the match to be played in a suitably-sized stadium in their home union's territory, but not necessarily their own normal home stadium.

=== Seeding ===
Rank	Team	Pts	Diff	TF
Pool leaders
1	(France) Bordeaux Bègles	20	+141	33
2	(Ireland) Leinster	18	+59	18
3	(England) Northampton Saints	16	+31	20
4	(France) Toulon	13	0	12
Pool runners-up
5	(France) Toulouse	19	+163	33
6	(France) Castres	14	+19	13
7	(Scotland) Glasgow Warriors	12	+11	16
8	(France) La Rochelle	11	+23	12
Pool third place
9	(Ireland) Munster	12	+27	13
10	(England) Leicester Tigers	11	–15	20
11	(Italy) Benetton	11	–26	11
12	(England) Sale Sharks	10	–11	12
Pool fourth place
13	(England) Saracens	11	+20	11
14	(France) Clermont	10	+8	13
15	(England) Harlequins	9	+31	16
16	(Ireland) Ulster	5	–61	15

=== Bracket ===
Round of 16
1	(France) Bordeaux Bègles	43
16	(Ireland) Ulster	31
8	(France) La Rochelle	24
9	(Ireland) Munster	25
4	(France) Toulon	72
13	(England) Saracens	42
5	(France) Toulouse	38
12	(England) Sale Sharks	15
2	(Ireland) Leinster	62
15	(England) Harlequins	0
7	(Scotland) Glasgow Warriors	43
10	(England) Leicester Tigers	19
3	(England) Northampton Saints	46
14	(France) Clermont	24
6	(France) Castres	39
11	(Italy) Benetton	37

Quarter-finals
1	(France) Bordeaux Bègles	47
9	(Ireland) Munster	29
4	(France) Toulon	18
5	(France) Toulouse	21
2	(Ireland) Leinster	52
7	(Scotland) Glasgow Warriors	0
3	(England) Northampton Saints	51
6	(France) Castres	16

Semi-finals
1	(France) Bordeaux Bègles	35
5	(France) Toulouse	18
2	(Ireland) Leinster	34
3	(England) Northampton Saints	37

Final
1	(France) Bordeaux Bègles	28
3	(England) Northampton Saints	20

=== Round of 16 ===
4 April 2025
20:00

Northampton Saints (England) (3)	46–24	(14) (France) Clermont
Try: F. Smith 18' c Freeman (3) 23' m, 29' m, 60' m Augustus (2) 41' c, 46' c Pollock 71' c Con: F. Smith (4/7) 19', 42', 47', 72'; Pen: F. Smith (1/1) 15'	Report	Try: Moala 11' c Raka 49' c Fainga'a 55' c Con: Belleau (3/3) 12', 50', 56'; Pen: Belleau (1/1) 41'

cinch Stadium @ Franklin's Gardens, Northampton
Attendance: 13,481
Referee: Andrew Brace (Ireland)

5 April 2025
13:30

Toulon (France) (4)	72–42	(13) (England) Saracens
Try: Wainiqolo 5' c Isa (3) 35' c, 55' c, 59' c Jaminet (2) 39' c, 70' m Alainu'uese 44' m Fainga'anuku 62' c Serin 74' c Tuicuvu 76' c Con: Jaminet (8/10) 6', 35', 40', 55', 60', 63', 75', 77'; Pen: Jaminet (2/2) 12', 14'	Report	Try: González (2) 3' c, 22' c Tompkins 7' c Hartley 16' c van Zyl 31' c Hadfield 65' c Con: Burke (6/6) 4', 8', 17', 23', 32', 66'

Stade Mayol, Toulon
Attendance: 15,733
Referee: Nika Amashukeli (Georgia)

5 April 2025
15:00

Leinster (Ireland) (2)	62–0	(15) (England) Harlequins
Try: Prendergast 14' m J. McCarthy 17' c J. Osborne 27' c van der Flier 44' m Ringrose 47' c Sheehan 58' m Penalty try 66'; R. Byrne 71' c Lowe (2) 77' m, 80' c Con: Prendergast (3/6) 17', 27', 48'; R. Byrne (2/3) 72', 80'	Report

Croke Park, Dublin
Attendance: 55,627
Referee: Pierre Brousset (France)

5 April 2025
16:00

Castres (France) (6)	39–37	(11) (Italy) Benetton
Try: Baget (2) 2' c, 22' m Chabouni 16' c Babillot 39' m Ambadiang 64' m Fernandez 78' c Con: Le Brun (2/4) 3', 17'; Fernandez (1/2) 79'; Pen: Le Brun (1/2) 47'	Report	Try: Gallo 4' c Mendy 32' m Brex 35' c Bernasconi 43' m Odogwu 57' c Con: Albornoz (3/5) 5', 36', 58'; Pen: Albornoz (2/2) 7', 62'

Stade Pierre-Fabre, Castres
Attendance: 12,258
Referee: Karl Dickson (England)

5 April 2025
18:30

La Rochelle (France) (8)	24–25	(9) (Ireland) Munster
Try: Botia 10' c Penalty try 65'; Bosmorin 76' c Con: West (1/1) 11'; Hastoy (1/1) 76'; Pen: West (1/1) 42'	Report	Try: Casey 24' c Coombes 47' c A. Smith 51' m Con: Crowley (2/3) 24', 48'; Pen: Crowley (1/1) 41'; Drop: Crowley 68'

Stade Marcel-Deflandre, La Rochelle
Attendance: 16,700
Referee: Andrea Piardi (Italy)

5 April 2025
20:00

Glasgow Warriors (Scotland) (7)	43–19	(10) (England) Leicester Tigers
Try: Venter (2) 13' c, 74' m Vailanu (2) 18' c, 41' c Hastings 49' c Horne 50' c Con: Hastings (5/6) 14', 19', 42', 50', 51'; Pen: Hastings (1/1) 42'	Report	Try: Cracknell 2' m Kata 56' c Liebenberg 66' c Con: Pollard (2/3) 59', 67'

Scotstoun Stadium, Glasgow
Attendance: 7,321
Referee: Craig Evans (Wales)

6 April 2025
13:30

Bordeaux Bègles (France) (1)	43–31	(16) (Ireland) Ulster
Try: Penaud 6' c Tameifuna 15' c Coleman 20' c Buros 40' c Lamothe 50' m Janse van Rensburg 70' c Con: Carbery (4/5) 6', 16', 21', 40+1'; Jalibert (1/1) 71'; Pen: Lucu (1/1) 46'	Report	Try: O'Toole 28' c McCann 35' c Timoney 55' m Ward (2) 63' m, 75' c Con: Cooney (2/2) 29', 37'; Doak (1/3) 76'

Stade Chaban-Delmas, Bordeaux
Attendance: 32,275
Referee: Luke Pearce (England)

6 April 2025
16:00

Toulouse (France) (5)	38–15	(12) (England) Sale Sharks
Try: Willis 1' c Cros 45' c Marchand 58' c Capuozzo 73' c Cramont 76' c Con: Ramos (5/5) 2', 46', 59', 74', 77'; Pen: Ramos (1/1) 35'	Report	Try: L. James 4' m Hill 29' c Con: Ford (1/2) 30'; Pen: Ford (1/1) 21'

Stadium de Toulouse, Toulouse
Attendance: 31,737
Referee: Sam Grove-White (Scotland)

=== Quarter-finals ===
11 April 2025
20:00

Leinster (Ireland) (2)	52–0	(7) (Scotland) Glasgow Warriors
Try: Deegan (2) 13' c, 75' m Penalty try 22'; Lowe 24' m T. O'Brien 29' c Keenan 33' c Ringrose 46' c Sheehan 57' c Con: Prendergast (5/6) 14', 30', 34', 47', 58'	Report

Aviva Stadium, Dublin
Attendance: 22,400
Referee: Luke Pearce (England)

12 April 2025
16:00

Bordeaux Bègles (France) (1)	47–29	(9) (Ireland) Munster
Try: Penaud 5' m Lucu 12' c Samu 24' c Echegaray 33' c Lamothe 56' m Bielle-Biarrey 77' c Con: Jalibert (3/5) 13', 25', 34'; Lucu (1/1) 78'; Pen: Jalibert (3/5) 11', 53', 76'	Report	Try: Nankivell 43' m A. Smith (2) 50' m, 72' c Penalty try 67'; Con: Crowley (2/3) 33', 73'; Pen: Crowley (1/1) 9'

Stade Chaban-Delmas, Bordeaux
Attendance: 32,215
Referee: Nika Amashukeli (Georgia)

12 April 2025
17:30

Northampton Saints (England) (3)	51–16	(6) (France) Castres
Try: Freeman 6' c Langdon 13' m Coles 31' m Furbank 44' c Pollock (2) 47' c, 61' c Pearson 77' c Con: F. Smith (5/7) 7', 44', 47', 61', 77'; Pen: F. Smith (2/2) 52', 68'	Report	Try: Fernandez 35' c Con: Fernandez (1/1) 36'; Pen: Fernandez (3/3) 9', 39', 42

cinch Stadium @ Franklin's Gardens, Northampton
Attendance: 11,673
Referee: Andrea Piardi (Italy)

13 April 2025
16:00

Toulon (France) (4)	18–21	(5) (France) Toulouse
Pen: Jaminet (6/6) 12', 23', 28', 31', 59', 62'	Report	Try: Willis 42' m Ahki 50' c Con: Ramos (1/2) 51'; Pen: Ramos (3/5) 10', 41', 80'

Stade Mayol, Toulon
Attendance: 16,490
Referee: Matthew Carley (England)

=== Semi-finals ===
3 May 2025
17:30

Leinster (Ireland) (2)	34–37	(3) (England) Northampton Saints
Try: O'Brien 17’ m van der Flier (2) 25’ c, 58' m Doris 46’ c Lowe 69’ c Con: Prendergast (3/5) 25', 47', 70'; Pen: Prendergast (1/1) 13'	Report	Try: Freeman (3) 7' c, 35' m, 37' m Pollock 28' c Ramm 62' c Con: Smith (3/5) 8', 29, 63'; Pen: Smith (2/2) 22', 55'

Aviva Stadium, Dublin
Attendance: 42,207
Referee: Pierre Brousset (France)

4 May 2025
16:00

Bordeaux Bègles (France) (1)	35–18	(5) (France) Toulouse
Try: Samu 3' c Bielle-Biarrey (2) 22' m, 40' c Bochaton 63' m Tameifuna 78' m Con: Jalibert (2/3) 4', 41'; Pen: Jalibert (1/1) 8'; Lucu (1/1) 28'	Report	Try: Delibes 14' m Barassi 54' c Con: Mallía (1/2) 54'; Pen: Mallía (2/2) 10', 20'

Matmut Atlantique, Bordeaux
Attendance: 42,096
Referee: Andrew Brace (Ireland)

=== Final ===
24 May 2025
14:45 BST (UTC+01)

Bordeaux Bègles (France) (1)	28–20	(3) (England) Northampton Saints
Try: Penaud (2) 5' m, 36' m Coleman 20' c Cazeaux 55' m Con: Jalibert (1/3) 21'; Pen: Jalibert (1/1) 28'; Lucu (1/1) 44'	Report	Try: Coles (2) 1' c, 40' c Con: Smith (2/2) 2', 40'; Pen: Smith (2/2) 24', 32'

Millennium Stadium, Cardiff
Attendance: 70,225
Referee: Nika Amashukeli (Georgia)

== Leading scorers ==
Note: Flags to the left of player names indicate national team as has been defined under World Rugby eligibility rules, or primary nationality for players who have not yet earned international senior caps. Players may hold one or more non-WR nationalities.

At the end of the final, winger Damian Penaud, winner of the competition and author of a new record of fourteen tries scored in the competition, is named best player of the 2024-2025 Champions Cup.

=== Most points ===
Rank	Player	Club	Points
1	(France) Thomas Ramos	(France) Toulouse	87
2	(England) Fin Smith	(England) Northampton	81
3	(France) Matthieu Jalibert	(France) Bordeaux Bègles	76
4	(Ireland) Sam Prendergast	(Ireland) Leinster	74
5	(France) Damian Penaud	(France) Bordeaux Bègles	70

=== Most tries ===
Rank	Player	Club	Tries
1	(France) Damian Penaud	(France) Bordeaux Bègles	14
2	(England) Tommy Freeman	(England) Northampton	9
3	(France) Louis Bielle-Biarrey	(France) Bordeaux Bègles	8
4	(England) Henry Pollock	(England) Northampton	7
5	(France) Emmanuel Meafou	(France) Toulouse	5
5	(Italy) Ange Capuozzo	(France) Toulouse	5
5	(South Africa) Juarno Augustus	(England) Northampton	5
5	(France) Rémy Baget	(France) Castres	5

== Discipline ==
=== Citings/bans ===
Player	Match (Note: The cited player's club is listed in bold italics.)	Citing date	Law breached	Result	Refs
(France) Pierre-Henri Azagoh	(Ireland) Munster vs. (France) **Stade Français** (Round 1 – 7 December 2024)	10 December 2024	9.13 – Dangerous Tackling (Red card)	3-match ban (Note: The ban is reduced by one match, subject to the player's completion of the World Rugby Coaching Intervention Programme.)	
(France) Baptiste Pesenti	(Ireland) Munster vs. (France) **Stade Français** (Round 1 – 7 December 2024)	10 December 2024	9.13 – Dangerous Tackling (Red card)	2-match ban	
(France) Yannick Youyoutte	(South Africa) Stormers vs. (France) **Toulon** (Round 1 – 7 December 2024)	11 December 2024	9.13 – Dangerous Tackling (Red card)	5-match ban	
(France) Sekou Macalou	(France) **Stade Français** vs. (England) Saracens (Round 2 – 15 December 2024)	17 December 2024	9.13 – Dangerous Tackling (Red card)	3-match ban	
(Scotland) Stafford McDowall	(France) Toulon vs. (Scotland) **Glasgow** (Round 2 – 15 December 2024)	19 December 2024	9.12 – Contact with Eye Area (Citing)	3-match ban	
(Tonga) Toma'akino Taufa	(England) Exeter vs. (France) **Bordeaux Bègles** (Round 3 – 11 January 2025)	16 January 2025	9.13 – Dangerous Tackling (Red card)	3-match ban	
(Georgia (country)) Giorgi Akhaladze	(England) Bath vs. (France) **Clermont** (Round 3 – 12 January 2025)	16 January 2025	9.13 – Dangerous Tackling (Red card)	4-match ban	
(England) Beno Obano	(Ireland) Leinster vs. (England) **Bath** (Round 4 – 18 January 2025)	21 January 2025	9.27 – 2 Yellow Cards (Red card)	Sending off sufficient	
(England) Will Goodrick-Clarke	(Ireland) Ulster vs. (England) **Exeter** (Round 4 – 17 January 2025)	22 January 2025	9.12 – Stamp/Trample (Citing)	1-match ban	
(South Africa) Hakeem Kunene	(France) Bordeaux Bègles vs. (South Africa) **Sharks** (Round 4 – 19 January 2025)	22 January 2025	9.13 – Dangerous Tackling (Citing)	3-match ban	
