= Henry Pollock (rugby union) =

British Lions & England international rugby union player

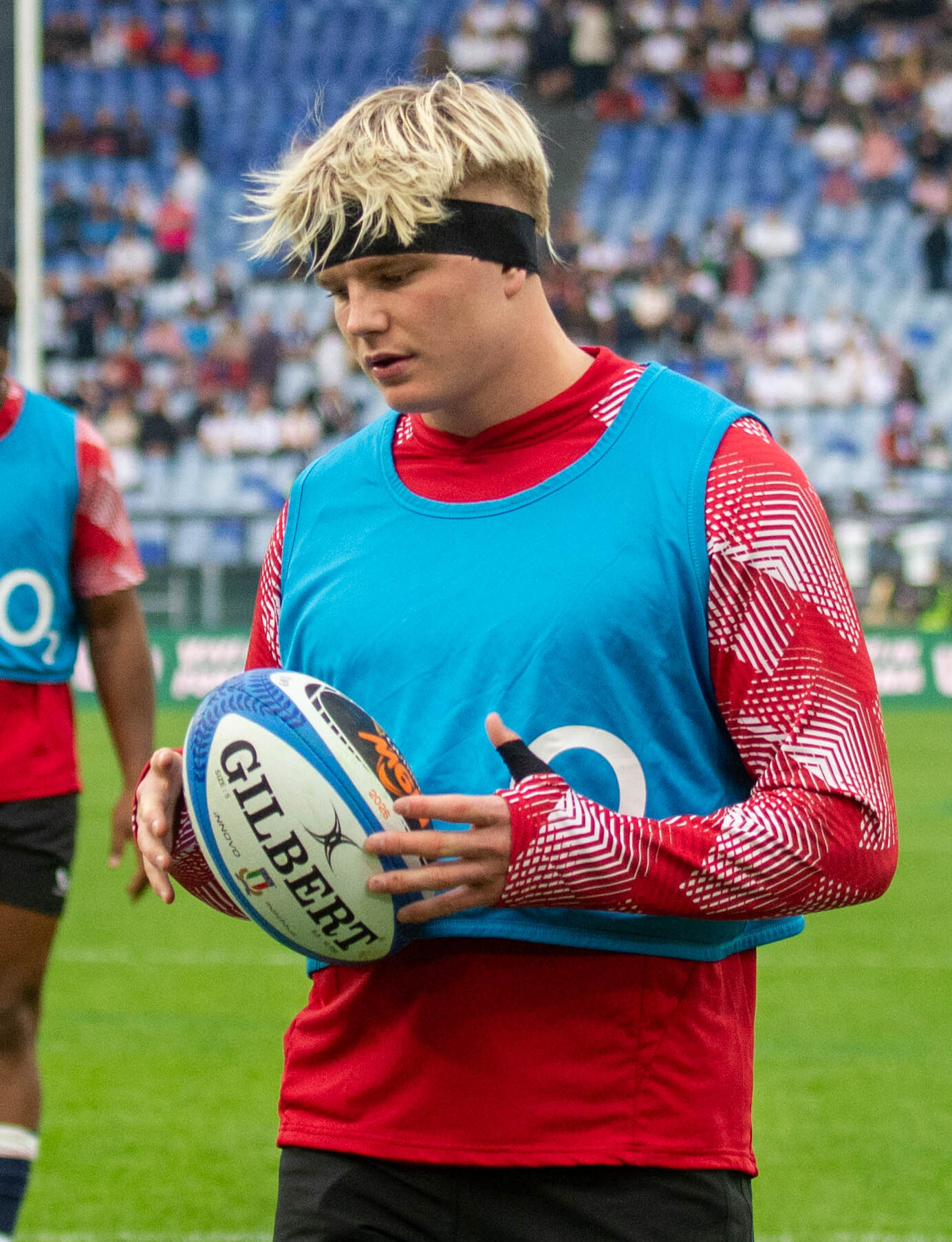
- Pollock with England in 2026
- Full name: Henry Joseph Pollock
- Born: 14 January 2005 (age 21) Banbury, Oxfordshire, England
- Height: 188 cm (6 ft 2 in)
- Weight: 103 kg (227 lb; 16 st 3 lb)
- School: Stowe School

Rugby union career
- Position(s): Flanker, Number 8, Winger
- Current team: Northampton Saints
Senior career
| Years | Team | Apps | (Points) |
| 2022– | Northampton Saints | 54 | (120) |
| 2023–2024 | → Bedford Blues (loan) | 5 | (15) |
- Correct as of 15 November 2026
International career
| Years | Team | Apps | (Points) |
| 2024–2025 | England U20 | 12 | (30) |
| 2024 | England A | 1 | (0) |
| 2025– | England | 15 | (40) |
| 2025 | British & Irish Lions | 0 | (0) |
- Correct as of 15 November 2026

Henry Joseph Pollock (born 14 January 2005) is an English professional rugby union player who plays predominantly in the back row for Northampton Saints and the England national team. He currently holds the record for being the youngest tryscorer of any English player in Six Nations history.

== Early life ==
Pollock attended Beachborough Prep School in Westbury, Buckinghamshire, and Stowe School. He joined the Northampton Saints Academy at under-13 level. He also played for Buckingham RFC. He was captain of the Northampton Saints under-18s side that reached the 2023 Academy League final.

== Club career ==
Pollock made his debut for the senior Northampton Saints team in the Premiership Rugby Cup during the 2022–23 season. In October 2022, he became Saints youngest try scorer in the professional era in a victory against Saracens. He signed a first professional contract with the club in the spring of 2023. Later that year in November 2023, Pollock made his debut for the side in the Premiership against Leicester Tigers. He also played five times on loan in the Rugby Championship for Bedford Blues during the 2023–24 season.

In December 2024, Pollock scored a try on his Champions Cup debut in a 38–8 victory over Castres Olympique in the opening round of the 2024–25 tournament. That month, he signed a new multi-year contract with Northampton. In March 2025, he scored his first Premiership try after a chip and chase during a 27–24 loss to Sale Sharks. In the Champions Cup quarter finals, he scored two tries again against Castres during a 51–16 victory. In April 2025, he was nominated for Champions Cup Player of the Year 2025. In May 2025, he scored a try during the Champions Cup semi-finals in a historic 37–34 victory over Leinster at the Aviva Stadium. He went on to start the final as Northampton were defeated 28–20 by Bordeaux Bègles. After the full time whistle, he was involved in an altercation after trying to separate Saints captain Fraser Dingwall and Bordeaux fly-half Matthieu Jalibert. Following the initial incident, Bordeaux prop Jefferson Poirot grabbed Pollock by the throat before the two were separated. Poirot was suspended for two weeks with Pollock being cleared on any wrongdoing. At the end of the season he won the Premiership Breakthrough Player of the Season award.

In December 2025, Pollock scored two tries in a 41–21 victory away against Bath. At the end of the season, he started in the 2026 Prem final as Northampton defeated Exeter Chiefs to become league champions. In March 2026, Pollock signed with Matchroom Talent Agency run by boxing promoter Eddie Hearn.

During the off-season Hearn demanded a substantial increase in salary on his current Northampton contract, suggesting annual earnings of £1million are the going rate of a player like Pollock. His existing deal, which was set to expire in Summer 2027, was thought to be around £150,000 per year. In September 2026, it was thought that a deal worth £400,000 a year until at least 2029, had been agreed with Northampton. However, days after those initial reports, Pollock denied a new deal had been signed, instead expressing the possibility that he could move abroad or even to a different sport. Later that month, it was confirmed that Pollock had re-signed with Saints on the previously reported multi-year deal worth £400,000 a year. Hearn remarked that Pollock had left a lot of money on the table by staying with the club but that, ultimately, it wasn't a tough decision.

== International career ==
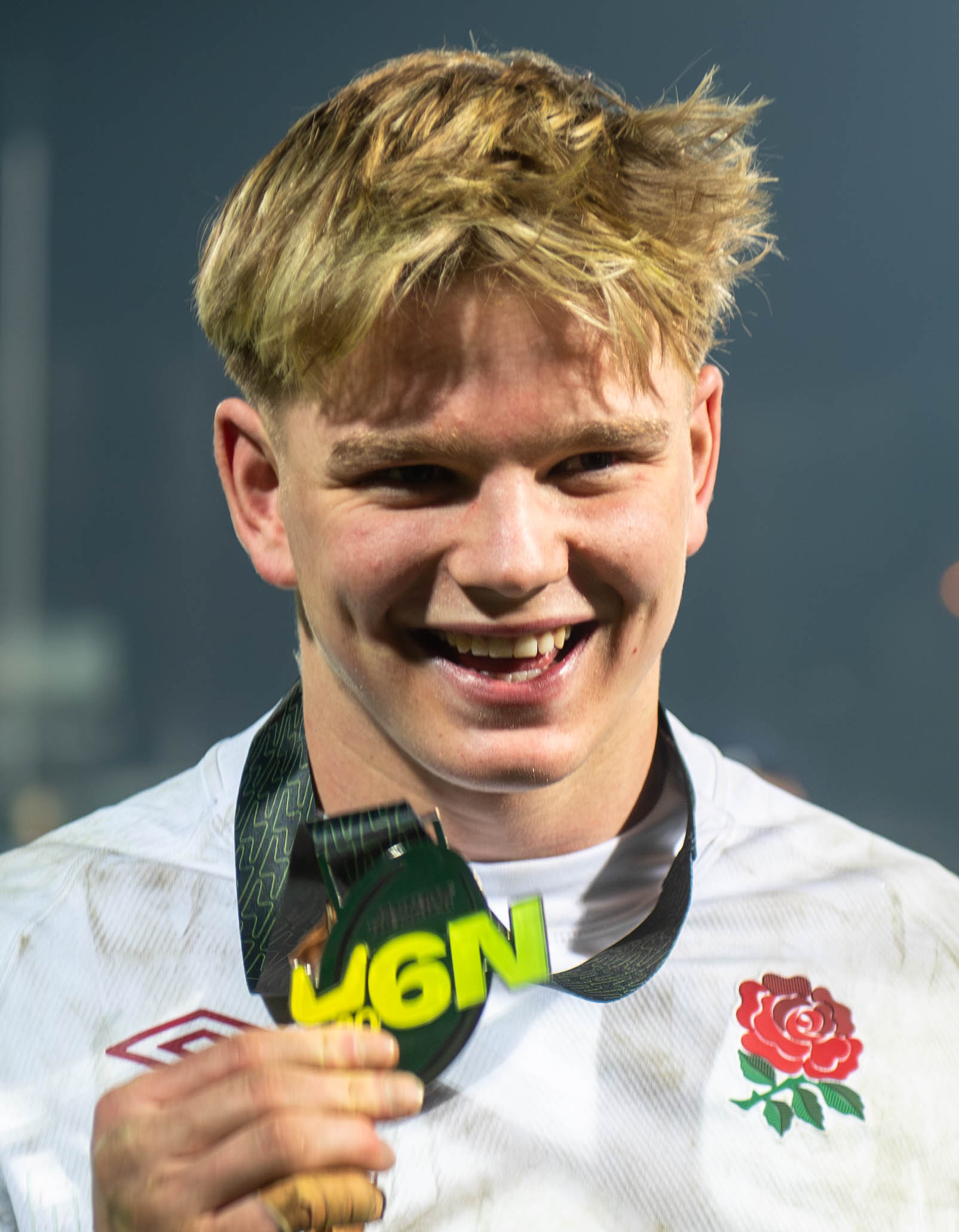
Pollock with the England under-20s in 2024.

=== England youth ===
Pollock captained the England U18 side on their 2022 tour of South Africa. He scored a hat trick on his debut for the England U20 side in the opening round of the 2024 Six Nations Under 20s Championship against Italy U20. He also scored a try in their last match as England won the competition. He was subsequently named player of the tournament.

Pollock was included in the England squad for the 2024 World Rugby U20 Championship. He started in the final as England defeated France at Cape Town Stadium to become champions. Later that year in November 2024, he was called up to England A for the first time and put in a Man of the Match performance against Australia A at Twickenham Stoop.

=== England ===
In January 2025, following an injury to Alex Dombrandt, Pollock was called up to the senior England squad for the first time ahead of the 2025 Six Nations Championship. On 15 March 2025, he scored two tries off the bench on his senior debut during a 68–14 victory over Wales in the final round. In doing so, he became the youngest tryscorer for England in the history of the tournament, overtaking the previous record held by Henry Arundell.

In November 2025, Pollock scored another try during a 25–7 victory against Australia in the 2025 Autumn Nations Series. He was later nominated for 2025 World Breakthrough Player of the Year before losing out to Fabian Holland. After a 27–23 victory against Argentina in the final round of the 2025 Autumn Nations Series, he was involved in a scuffle between Tom Curry and several Argentinian players, including Santiago Grondona, after the game had ended.

In February 2026, Pollock was named in the starting lineup for the first time ahead of the 2026 Six Nations fixture against Ireland. Pollock scored a second-half hat-trick of tries as a replacement in a 73–8 win against Fiji at Hill Dickinson Stadium during the 2026 Nations Championship on 11 July 2026. Before the following game, he was pictured mocking opposition fans from the team bus ahead of their fixture against Argentina. The incident took place the day after England were knocked about by Argentina at the 2026 FIFA World Cup.

On 8 November 2026, Pollock came off the bench to play wing replacing an injured Immanuel Feyi-Waboso during the 2026 Nations Championship match against Australia at Twickenham. He went to score two tries as England won the game 45–22.

=== British & Irish Lions ===
On 8 May 2025, Pollock was the youngest player selected for the British & Irish Lions squad for the 2025 British & Irish Lions tour to Australia. He made his debut for the side in the opening match against Argentina. In July 2025, having originally been named in the starting lineup, he sustained a tight calf prior to kickoff against the Waratahs and was replaced by Scott Cummings. Pollock did not participate in the test series but did score his only try of the tour in a victory against AUNZ Invitational XV.

=== List of international tries ===
as of 10 November 2026

| No. | Date | Venue | Opponent | Score | Result | Competition |
|---|---|---|---|---|---|---|
| 1 | 15 March 2025 | Millennium Stadium, Cardiff, Wales | Wales | 7–45 | 14–68 | 2025 Six Nations Championship |
| 2 | 15 March 2025 | Millennium Stadium, Cardiff, Wales | Wales | 14–59 | 14–68 | 2025 Six Nations Championship |
| 3 | 1 November 2025 | Twickenham Stadium, London, England | Australia | 15–7 | 25–7 | 2025 Autumn Internationals |
| 4 | 11 July 2026 | Hill Dickinson Stadium, Liverpool, England | Fiji | 47–8 | 73–8 | 2026 Nations Championship |
| 5 | 11 July 2026 | Hill Dickinson Stadium, Liverpool, England | Fiji | 64–8 | 73–8 | 2026 Nations Championship |
| 6 | 11 July 2026 | Hill Dickinson Stadium, Liverpool, England | Fiji | 71–8 | 73–8 | 2026 Nations Championship |
| 7 | 8 November 2026 | Twickenham Stadium, London, England | Australia | | 45–22 | 2026 Nations Championship |
| 8 | 8 November 2026 | Twickenham Stadium, London, England | Australia | | 45–22 | 2026 Nations Championship |

== Personal life ==
Pollock's parents, John and Hester, were born and raised in Scotland. His older sister, Zoe, is a 400m hurdler at the University of Georgia. and he has one older brother, Angus.

== Honours ==
Northampton Saints

- PREM Rugby: 2025–2026
- European Rugby Champions Cup runner up: 2024–2025

England U20

- World Rugby Junior World Championship: 2024
- Six Nations Under 20s Championship: 2024
