= Paul Méliande =

French footballer (born 2001)

Paul Meliande
Personal information
- Date of birth: 20 December 2001 (age 24)
- Place of birth: Orthez, France
- Height: 1.87 m (6 ft 2 in)
- Position: Winger

Team information
- Current team: Angoulême
- Number: 8

Youth career
- Elan Football
- Pau

Senior career*
Years	Team	Apps	(Gls)
2019–2023	Pau II	36	(3)
2020–2023	Pau	7	(0)
2023–2024	Libourne	20	(0)
2024–2025	Lorient B	22	(0)
2025–	Angoulême	6	(0)
- * Club domestic league appearances and goals as of 4 December 2025

Paul Meliande (born 20 December 2001) is a French footballer who plays as a winger for Championnat National 1 club Angoulême.

== Early life ==
Paul Méliande was born on 20 December 2001 in Orthez, Pyrénées-Atlantiques, France. He has a twin brother, Martin Méliande. They grew up in the town of Orthez, in the Béarn region, in a sports-oriented family—Paul and Martin's father played football, while their mother played basketball.

Martin began playing rugby union at the age of five for US Orthez, while Paul chose to follow the family tradition by playing football, starting at Elan Béarnais Football.

In 2015, Martin joined the youth academy of Section Paloise, while Paul joined Pau FC. Both brothers lived as boarding students at the Prytanée sportif in Pau. Martin left Section Paloise after a year and returned to US Orthez, while Paul continued his football development and later turned professional with Pau FC.

== Career ==
Meliande is a youth product of Élan béarnais Football and Pau.

He began his senior career with Pau FC's reserve side in 2019 and signed his first professional contract with the club on 20 August 2020. He made his professional debut in a Ligue 2 match against Valenciennes on 22 August 2020, a 3–0 loss for Pau.

After stints with Pau's senior and reserve teams, Meliande joined FC Libourne in July 2023 on a free transfer. In July 2024, he transferred again on a free move to Lorient B, where he plays in Championnat National 3.

In 2025, Méliande joined Angoulême Charente FC.
