= Jérôme Rey =

French rugby union player

- Born: 19 May 1995 (age 31) Albertville, France
- Height: 1.83 m (6 ft 0 in)
- Weight: 112 kg (247 lb)

Rugby union career
- Position: Loosehead prop
Senior career
Years	Team	Apps	(Points)
2016–2017	CS Bourgoin-Jallieu	7	(0)
2017–2019	SO Chambéry	38	(20)
2019–2021	FC Grenoble	44	(10)
2021–	Lyon OU	95	(20)
- Correct as of 15 March 2022
International career
Years	Team	Apps	(Points)
2022–	France		
- Correct as of 15 March 2022

Jérôme Rey (born 19 May 1995) is a French rugby union player, who plays for Lyon OU. He also is a farmer in Saint-Vital, a commune located in the Tarentaise Valley of his native Savoie.

He was first called to the French national team in February 2022, for the following Six Nations Championship. He was a regular member of the French squad during the tournament, whilst still yet to earn his first cap.
