= Maxime Lamothe =

France international rugby union player

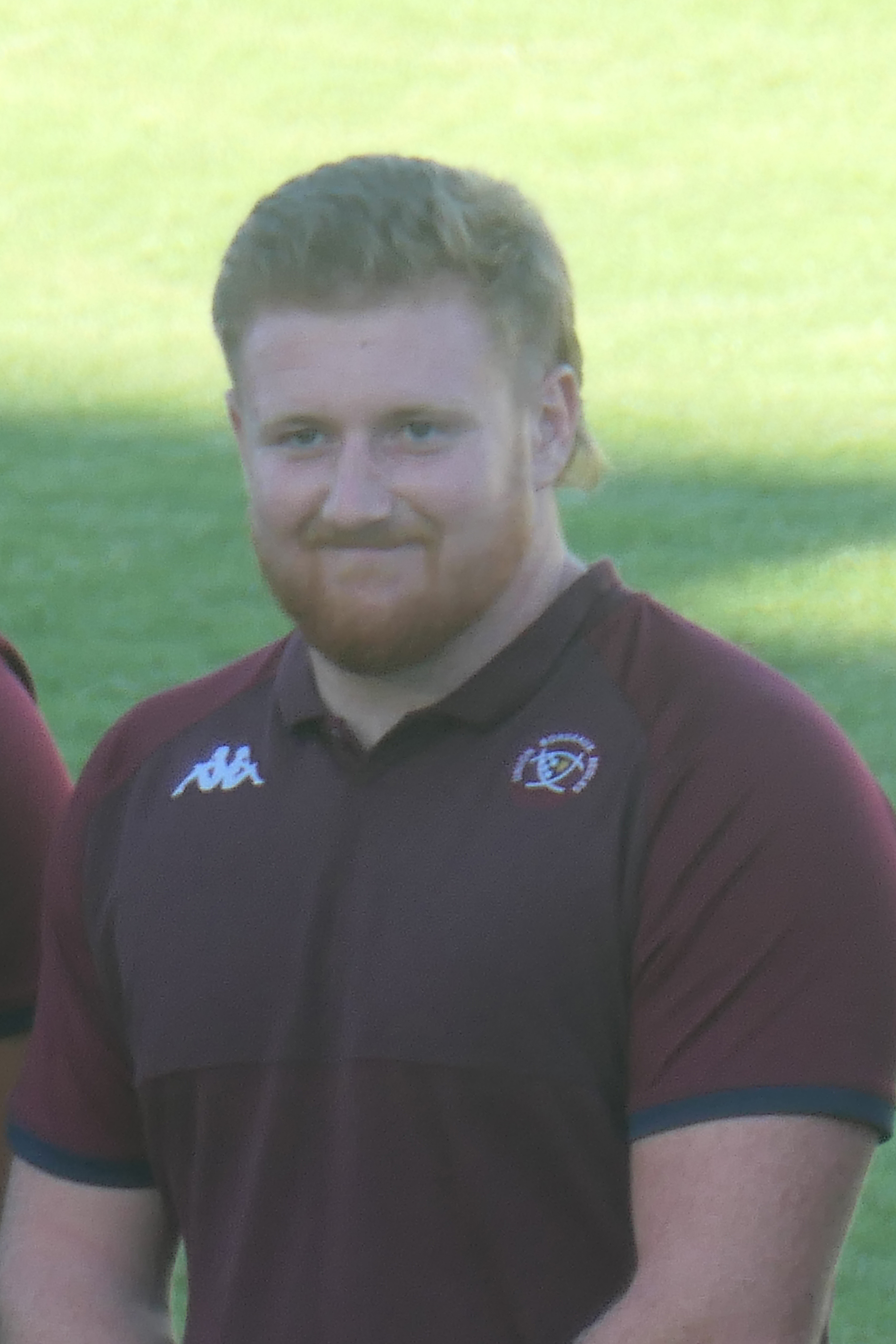
- Lamothe in 2022
- Born: 3 October 1998 (age 28) Talence, France
- Height: 1.83 m (6 ft 0 in)
- Weight: 109 kg (240 lb; 17 st 2 lb)

Rugby union career
- Position: Hooker
- Current team: Bordeaux Bègles
Amateur team(s)
| Years | Team | Apps | (Points) |
| 2008–2013 | Pessac Rugby | | |
| 2013–2017 | Bordeaux Bègles | | |
Senior career
| Years | Team | Apps | (Points) |
| 2017– | Bordeaux Bègles | 133 | (100) |
| 2019–2020 | → Bayonne (loan) | 18 | (5) |
- Correct as of 29 October 2024
International career
| Years | Team | Apps | (Points) |
| 2018 | France U20 | 7 | (5) |
| 2025– | France | 3 | (5) |
- Correct as of 15 February 2026

Maxime Lamothe (born 3 October 1998) is a French professional rugby union player who plays as a hooker for Top 14 club Bordeaux Bègles and the France national team.

== Club career ==
Lamothe initially played tennis, judo, and soccer before starting rugby in Pessac at the age of 10.

Trained at Union Bordeaux Bègles, Lamothe made his professional debut there during the 2017-2018 season, on 18 February 2018, at just 19 years old, in the 17th round of the Top 14 against Castres. He came on as a substitute for Florian Dufour with 16 minutes remaining in the match. He only played five matches in his first professional season. He played slightly more the following season (2018-2019), appearing in ten league matches and four European Challenge Cup matches. However, he remains behind internationals Adrien Pélissié, Clément Maynadier, and even the younger Dufour in the hooker hierarchy at UBB.

Lamothe was loaned to Aviron Bayonnais for the 2019-2020 season, where he quickly established himself as an important member of the Basque front row, playing a part in Aviron's excellent start to the season, culminating in a third-place finish in the Top 14 at the start of the season. Since returning from loan, he has gradually established himself in the Bordeaux squad, becoming a regular starter from the 2020-2021 season. He notably scored six tries during that same season. The following season, he played twenty-two matches, including fourteen as a starter, and scored two tries. At the end of the 2021-2022 season, he extended his contract for three additional seasons, tying him to the club until 2025.

His consistent strong performances and progress allowed Lamothe to begin the 2022-2023 season as a regular at hooker. At the start of the 2023-2024 season, Yannick Bru, the new UBB manager, entrusted him with the responsibility of vice-captain. On 28 June 2024, Lamothe started in the Top 14 final, exceptionally held at the Stade Vélodrome in Marseille, against Stade Toulousain. Bordeaux failed to trouble Toulouse and lost by a resounding score of 59 to 3.

== International career ==
Lamothe has been capped several times by the French under-19 team. He was notably called up for a double-header against Ireland and England in April 2017. He then participated in the summer tour of South Africa in August 2017, during which he served as captain.

The following year, in 2018, Lamothe was selected by Sébastien Piqueronies to participate in the Six Nations Under 20s Championship with the French under-20 team. He played his first match against Ireland as a starter. He then played his second match of the tournament a week later, against Scotland. He once again started, scored his first try for France, and France won 69 to 19. The French ultimately won the tournament, and Lamothe won the first title of his career.

A few months later, Lamothe was again selected for the under-20 team, this time to participate in the World Rugby Under 20 Championship. During this competition, he played every match, including only one as a starter, with Guillaume Marchand being the starting player. France won this tournament, their second consecutive Under-20 title.

In February 2024, Lamothe was called up to the French national team by Fabien Galthié to replace Gaëtan Barlot, who had withdrawn, in preparation for the third day of the Six Nations Championship against Italy.

== Career statistics ==
=== List of international tries ===
International tries
| No. | Date | Venue | Opponent | Score | Result | Competition |
|---|---|---|---|---|---|---|
| 1 | 22 November 2025 | Stade de France, Saint-Denis, France | Australia | 46–33 | 48–33 | 2025 Autumn internationals |

== Style of play ==
A modern hooker, Lamothe is particularly noted for his mobility and his ability to play an evasive game uncommon in his position. He is also no less effective in more traditional number 2 roles such as the throw-in.

== Honours ==
France

- 1x Six Nations Championship: 2026

France U20

- World Rugby Under 20 Championship: 2018
- Six Nations Under 20s Championship: 2018

Bordeaux Bègles

- 2× European Rugby Champions Cup: 2025, 2026
