= Martin Méliande =

French rugby union player (born 2001)

- Born: December 20, 2001 (age 24) Orthez, France
- Height: 1.87 m (6 ft 2 in)

Rugby union career
- Position(s): Fly-half, Fullback
- Current team: Lyon OU
Youth career
- 2008–2015: US Orthez
- 2015–2016: Section Paloise
- 2016–2020: US Orthez
- 2020–2021: Biarritz Olympique
Senior career
| Years | Team | Apps | (Points) |
| 2021–2022 | US Bressane | 5 | (8) |
| 2022–2024 | Racing 92 | 13 | (23) |
| 2024– | → Lyon OU (loan) | | |
- Correct as of 22 May 2025

Martin Méliande (born 20 December 2001) is a French rugby union player who plays as a fly-half or fullback for Lyon OU in the Top 14, on loan from Racing 92.

== Early life ==
Martin Méliande was born in Orthez, in the Pyrénées-Atlantiques department of southwestern France. He is the twin brother of professional footballer Paul Méliande. The Méliande brothers grew up in Béarn, in a sports-oriented family: their father played football, and their mother played basketball.

Martin started playing rugby union at the age of five with US Orthez, while Paul pursued football with Élan Béarnais Orthez. In 2015, Martin joined the academy of Section Paloise, while Paul joined Pau FC; the brothers boarded at the sports-focused Prytanée in Pau. Martin left the Section Paloise academy after one season and returned to US Orthez. Paul later became a professional footballer with Pau FC.

In 2020, Martin joined the Espoirs (under-23 squad) of Biarritz Olympique.

== Club career ==
Méliande began his professional rugby career with US Bressane during the 2021–22 season in Pro D2, the second division of French rugby. He played a role in helping the club avoid relegation.

In 2022, he signed with Racing 92 and played in the Top 14. During the 2023–24 season, he appeared in eleven Top 14 matches, starting four, and scored 23 points. He also made an appearance in the Champions Cup.

Ahead of the 2024–25 season, Méliande joined Lyon OU on loan from Racing 92. In December 2024, he announced that he would remain with Lyon permanently starting in the 2025–26 season.

== Personal life ==
Martin is the twin brother of Paul Méliande, a professional footballer for Lorient FC.
