= Maxime Lucu =

France international rugby union player

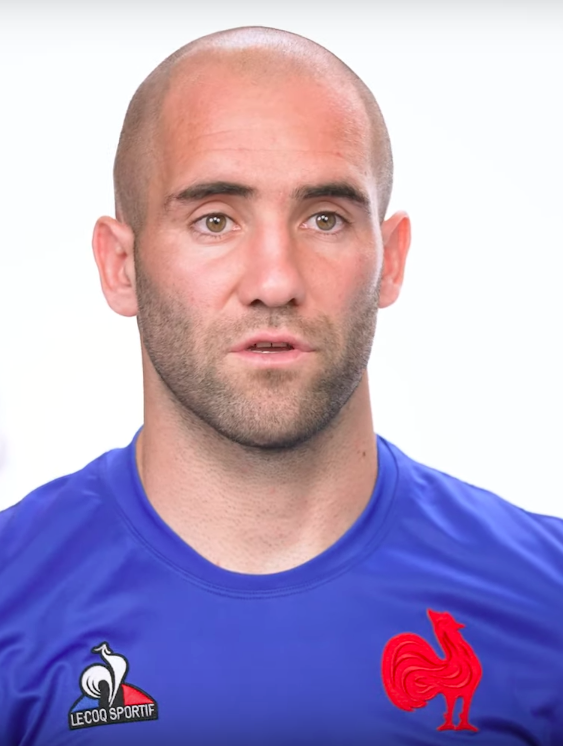
- Lucu representing France
- Born: 12 January 1993 (age 33) Saint-Jean-de-Luz, France
- Height: 1.77 m (5 ft 10 in)
- Weight: 79 kg (174 lb; 12 st 6 lb)

Rugby union career
- Position(s): Scrum-half, Fly-half
- Current team: Bordeaux Bègles
Senior career
Years	Team	Apps	(Points)
2014–2019	Biarritz	143	(1,233)
2019–	Bordeaux Bègles	138	(575)
- Correct as of 18 March 2025
International career
Years	Team	Apps	(Points)
2021–	France	38	(65)
- Correct as of 18 November 2026

Maxime Lucu (born 12 January 1993) is a French professional rugby union player who plays as a scrum-half for Top 14 club Bordeaux Bègles and the France national team.

== Club career ==
In May 2025, he captained Bordeaux Bègles, kicked two conversions and a 60-metre penalty during a 35–18 victory over reigning champions Toulouse in the Champions Cup to helps his side reach their first ever European final.

== International career ==
He was called into the France national team for the 2021 Six Nations.

== Career statistics ==
=== List of international tries ===
International tries
No.	Date	Venue	Opponent	Score	Result	Competition
1	10 March 2024	Millennium Stadium, Cardiff, Wales	Wales	24–45	24–45	2024 Six Nations

== Honours ==
France

- 2x Six Nations Championship: 2022, 2025
- 1× Grand Slam: 2022

Bordeaux Bègles

- 2× European Rugby Champions Cup: 2025, 2026
