= Tom Dunn (rugby union) =

England international rugby union player

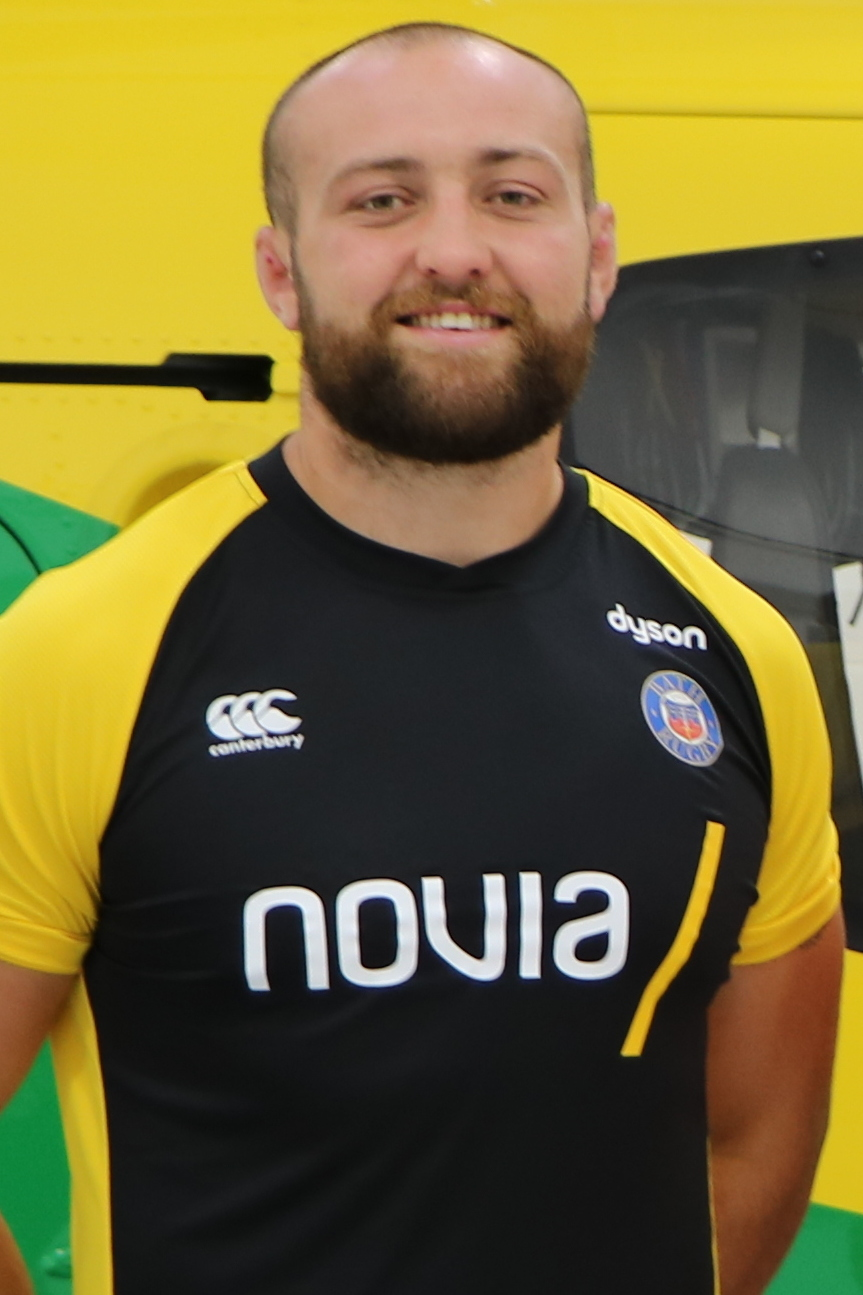
- Dunn with Wiltshire Air Ambulance helicopter and crew
- Born: Tom Dunn; 12 November 1992 (age 34) Bath, Somerset, England
- Height: 1.87 m (6 ft 2 in)
- Weight: 106 kg (234 lb; 16 st 10 lb)
- School: Sheldon School
- University: University of Bath

Rugby union career
- Position: Hooker
Senior career
Years	Team	Apps	(Points)
2012–	Bath	265	(300)
2012	→ London Scottish	7	(5)
- Correct as of 1 May 2026
International career
Years	Team	Apps	(Points)
2020	England	3	(0)
- Correct as of 21 November 2020

Tom Dunn (born 12 November 1992) is an English professional rugby union footballer who plays at hooker for Bath. At international level he made three appearances for England in 2020.

== Club career ==
Dunn initially played rugby at Chippenham RFC. He joined Bath Rugby’s senior setup in 2012, making his professional debut against Calvisano in the European Challenge Cup. Early in his professional career, he spent short loan spells with London Scottish and Rotherham Titans. Dunn started in the 2013–14 European Challenge Cup final which Bath lost against Northampton Saints at Cardiff Arms Park to finish runners-up.

Dunn was Bath’s top try-scorer in the Premiership in the 2022–23 season, recording a dozen tries, including a memorable hat-trick against Saracens in the final game of the season.

In 2023, Dunn celebrated a milestone by reaching 200 appearances for Bath Rugby, becoming one of 10 players to achieve the career landmark in the professional era, joining the likes of Nick Abendanon, Olly Barkley, David Flatman and Matt Banahan. At the end of that campaign he started in the Premiership final which they lost against Northampton.

Dunn scored two tries in the 2024–25 Premiership Rugby Cup final as Bath beat Exeter Chiefs to win their first domestic trophy since 1996. He also scored a try during the 2024–25 EPCR Challenge Cup final which saw Bath defeat Lyon at the Millennium Stadium to win their first European trophy for seventeen years.

In May 2025, Dunn set a new club record for the most Premiership appearances for Bath, surpassing David Barnes, playing in his 184th Premiership match. Dunn scored a memorable try in the 47th minute of this match, following an elaborate dummy and a subsequent 20-metre sprint to the line. At the end of that campaign he started in the 2024–25 Premiership Rugby final which saw Bath defeat Leicester Tigers to become champions of England for the first time since 1996.

== International career ==
In August 2017, Dunn was invited to a training camp with the senior England squad by coach Eddie Jones. In January 2018, he was named in England's squad for the 2018 Six Nations Championship.

Dunn was called up again for the 2020 Six Nations Championship and was an unused substitute against Scotland at Murrayfield. On 31 October 2020, he made his Test debut from the bench as a replacement for Jamie George in England's delayed final Six Nations match against Italy at Stadio Olimpico, which they won to become champions.

In November 2020, Dunn earned his second and third caps against Georgia and Ireland during the Autumn Nations Cup. In January 2023, he was called into the England Six Nations' training squad as an injury replacement.

== Philanthropy ==
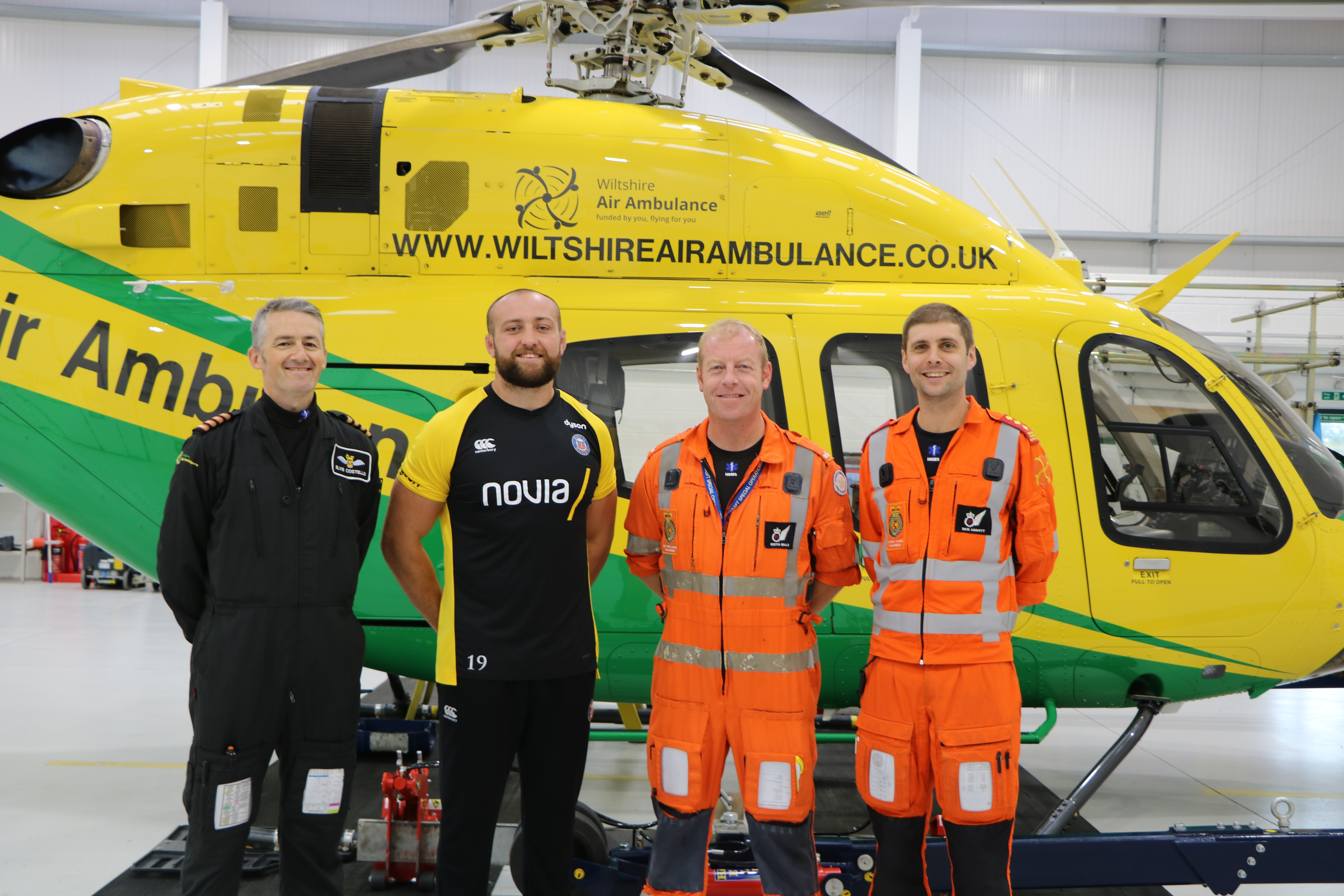
Dunn with Wiltshire Air Ambulance crew and helicopter.

Dunn supports and is an ambassador of Wiltshire and Bath Air Ambulance Charity.

== Honours ==
Bath

- Premiership Rugby: 2024–2025
- EPCR Challenge Cup: 2024–2025
- Premiership Rugby Cup: 2024–2025

England

- Six Nations Championship: 2020
