= Alex Dombrandt =

England international rugby union player

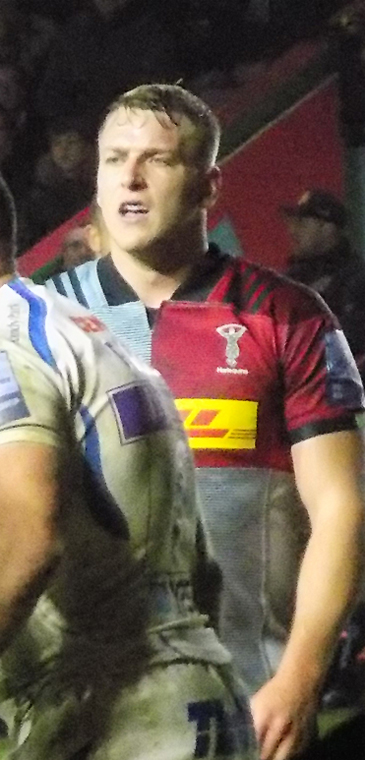
- Dombrandt representing Harlequins during the Gallagher Premiership
- Full name: Alex Joseph Dombrandt
- Born: 29 April 1997 (age 29) Surrey, England
- Height: 1.91 m (6 ft 3 in)
- Weight: 118 kg (260 lb; 18 st 8 lb)
- School: The John Fisher School
- University: Cardiff Metropolitan University

Rugby union career
- Position(s): Number 8, Flanker
- Current team: Harlequins
Senior career
Years	Team	Apps	(Points)
2018–	Harlequins	172	(425)
- Correct as of 10 April 2026
International career
Years	Team	Apps	(Points)
2017	Wales U20	5	(0)
2021–	England	23	(5)
- Correct as of 12 July 2025

Alex Joseph Dombrandt (born 29 April 1997) is an English professional rugby union player who plays as a number eight for Prem Rugby club Harlequins and the England national team.

== Early life ==
Dombrandt began playing rugby at the age of six for Warlingham R.F.C and Old Caterhamians in Surrey, originally at fly-half before switching into the forwards pack. He attended The John Fisher School as a pupil. He attended the school alongside future Harlequins teammate and Ireland international Kieran Treadwell.

He played no rugby for representative sides or a professional academy before joining Cardiff Metropolitan University in 2015.

== Club career ==
In February 2018, Dombrandt signed for Harlequins ahead of the following season.

Dombrandt reduced his weight from 130 kg (at university) to 120 kg by the 2019-2020 season.

He scored a try during Harlequins 43–36 victory against Bristol Bears in the Premiership semi-final, a game in which Quins recovered from a 28 point deficit to win. He started the following week in the Premiership final against Exeter Chiefs and scored another try as Harlequins won the game 40–38 in the highest scoring Premiership final ever.

In April 2024, he started for Harlequins in their Champions Cup Round of 16 victory over Glasgow Warriors, winning 28–24 at The Stoop, the first time the club had ever won a knockout game in the competition. The following week he scored a try against Bordeaux Begles, winning 42–41, to give them their second ever victory in the knockout stages of the competition and the first time they have achieved this away.

Ahead of the 2024–25 season, he was named permanent captain of Harlequins taking over from Stephan Lewies. In December 2024, he scored a hat-trick in their opening home fixture of the 2024–25 Champions Cup in a 56–19 win over the Stormers. In February 2025, he scored a try and captained the side in the Premiership Cup against Saracens during his 150th appearance for the club.

== International career ==
He played for Wales under 20s in all five of their games in the 2017 Six Nations Under 20s Championship, qualifying as a resident student at a Welsh university. However he has no birth, family or residency qualifications to play for Wales at Test level.

Dombrandt's form for Harlequins led to calls from Stuart Barnes and others for him to be included in the England international squad. On 2 June 2019, Dombrandt made his England debut, playing in a non-cap match against the Barbarians, in which he scored two tries. In June 2019, he was one of four uncapped players named in England's preliminary World Cup training squad but was not selected for the tournament.

On 10 July 2021, Dombrandt made his senior England Test debut in a 70-14 victory against Canada at Twickenham.

In February 2025, following an impressive performance against Saracens in the Premiership Cup, Dombrandt was recalled to the senior training squad midway through the 2025 Six Nations ahead of their fixture against Scotland.

== Career statistics ==
=== List of international tries ===
No.	Date	Venue	Opponent	Score	Result	Competition
1	26 February 2022	Twickenham Stadium, London, England	Wales	17–0	23–19	2022 Six Nations Championship

as of 26 February 2022
