= Louis Le Brun =

French rugby union player

- Born: Louis Le Brun; 28 February 2002 (age 24) France
- Height: 1.90 m (6 ft 3 in)
- Weight: 96 kg (15 st 2 lb; 212 lb)

Rugby union career
- Position(s): Centre, Fly-half, Full-back
- Current team: Castres
Youth career
- 2007–2010: Hyères
- 2010–2015: Hyères Carqueiranne La Crau
- 2015–2020: Toulon
Senior career
Years	Team	Apps	(Points)
2020–	Castres	73	(302)
- Correct as of 13 May 2025
International career
Years	Team	Apps	(Points)
2022	France U20	5	(7)
- Correct as of 22 June 2022

Louis Le Brun (born 28 February 2002) is a French rugby union player. He currently plays as a centre, fly-half or full-back for Castres in the Top 14.

Coming from Var, his uncle is the former French international rugby union fly-half Yann Delaigue.

== Career ==
Louis Le Brun was called by Fabien Galthié to the French national team for the first time in June 2022, for the summer tour of Japan.
