= Rémy Baget =

French rugby union player

- Born: Rémy Baget; 27 July 1997 (age 29) France
- Height: 1.82 m (5 ft 11 1/2 in)
- Weight: 85 kg (13 st 5 lb; 187 lb)

Rugby union career
- Position: Wing
- Current team: Bayonne
Youth career
- 2004–2013: Rabastens Couffouleu
- 2013–2018: Toulouse
Senior career
| Years | Team | Apps | (Points) |
| 2018– | Bayonne | 52 | (90) |
- Correct as of 22 June 2022

Rémy Baget (born 27 July 1997) is a French rugby union player. He currently plays as a wing for Bayonne in the Top 14.

A former Toulouse academy player, he became professional with Bayonne.

== Career ==
Rémy Baget was called by Fabien Galthié to the French national team for the first time in June 2022, for the summer tour of Japan.
