= Dimitri Delibes =

French rugby union player

- Born: Dimitri Delibes; 17 March 1999 (age 27) Toulouse, France
- Height: 1.90 m (6 ft 3 in)
- Weight: 94 kg (14 st 11 lb; 207 lb)

Rugby union career
- Position(s): Wing, Outside Centre
- Current team: Toulouse
Youth career
- 2005–2018: Blagnac
- 2018–2020: Toulouse
Senior career
Years	Team	Apps	(Points)
2020–	Toulouse	59	(70)
- Correct as of 27 October 2024

Dimitri Delibes (born 17 March 1999) is a French rugby union player, who currently plays as a wing or a centre for Toulouse in the Top 14 and the Heineken Champions Cup.

== Early life ==
Born in Toulouse, Dimitri Delibes started rugby for renowned local club Blagnac at the age of six, and then joined Toulouse academy in 2018.

== Club career ==
Delibes made his professional debut with Toulouse on 1 November 2020 in a loss at Stade Français, during the 2020–21 Top 14 season.

He later won that season the 2020–21 European Rugby Champions Cup and the 2020–21 Bouclier de Brennus, having played five Top 14 games and one European game, at Munster in round of 16 on 3 April 2021.

== International career ==
On 30 October 2022, Delibes was first called by Fabien Galthié to the France national team for the Autumn internationals.

== Honours ==
=== Toulouse ===
- European Rugby Champions Cup: 2020–21, 2024
- Top 14: 2020–21
