= Alfie Barbeary =

English rugby union player

- Born: Alfie Jack Barbeary; 5 October 2000 (age 26) Banbury, England
- Height: 1.79 m (5 ft 10 in)
- Weight: 116 kg (18.3 st; 256 lb)
- School: Bloxham School

Rugby union career
- Position: Number 8
Youth career
- 2008–2015: Banbury RUFC
- 2015–2018: Wasps RFC
Senior career
Years	Team	Apps	(Points)
2018–2022	Wasps	34	(95)
2019	→ Nottingham (loan)	1	(0)
2022–2026	Bath	66	(95)
2026-	Saracens	0	(0)
- Correct as of 1 May 2026
International career
Years	Team	Apps	(Points)
2018	England U18	7	(30)
2019	England U19	1	(0)
2019	England U20	2	(5)
2024–	England A	1	(5)
- Correct as of 26 February 2024

Alfie Barbeary (born 5 October 2000) is an English professional rugby union player who plays as a number eight for Premiership Rugby club Saracens. He now plays in the back row having previously focused on hooker.

== Early life ==
Born in Banbury, Oxfordshire, Barbeary grew up in Deddington, starting rugby at age eight with Banbury RUFC.

Barbeary was part of the Banbury Rugby Club teams which won several Oxfordshire cups and Land Rover Cups at youth level. He was educated at Bloxham School and played in the team which won the under-18 National Schools Plate in 2019. He started training with Wasps under-15.

== Club career ==
Barbeary permanently entered Wasps’ Senior Academy squad for the 2019–20 season. After featuring in a Cup game with the senior team in 2018 as a substitute hooker, he spent some time in on loan with Nottingham during the 2019–20 RFU Championship, still being dual registered with Wasps.

Barbeary made his first Premiership start at the Ricoh Arena on 9 September 2020, scoring a hat trick against Leicester, making a strong impression playing as a blindside flanker. He became only the second player to score a treble on his first Premiership debut, after former Kiwis' winger Lesley Vainikolo.

In December 2020, Barbeary made his European club debut, starting as a number 8 in both fixtures against the Dragons and Montpellier. Already successful in Wales, he proved to be instrumental in the home performance against MHR, proving to be a decisive forward, breaking lines and scoring tries, but also showing his back skills with kicks, offloads and try assists, and eventually being named man of the match.

Barbeary however ended the year with an ankle syndesmosis injury, only allowing him to get back on the field in late March 2021, making the headlines as an early substitute against Newcastle Falcons, allowing his team to win the game after a come-back.

Wasps entered administration on 17 October 2022 and Barbeary was made redundant along with all other players and coaching staff. On 20 November 2022, it was confirmed that Barbeary had signed for Premiership rivals Bath on a long-term deal from the 2022-23 season.

In March 2026, he signed for Saracens ahead of the 2026–27 season.

== International career ==
Having already captained England under-18, Barbeary made his debut for the under-20 side in the last round of the 2019 Six Nations against Scotland, scoring a try after coming on as a replacement hooker. Later that year he was a member of the squad that finished fifth at the 2019 World Rugby Under 20 Championship.

In November 2020 Barbeary received his first call up to the senior England squad. In February 2024 he scored a try for England A against Portugal.

== Style of play ==
Barbeary was a centre through most of his youth career, naming Ma'a Nonu and Mathieu Bastareaud as his biggest influences. However, after entering Wasps' under-15 team he moved to the front row, becoming a hooker at both club and international levels. He has also frequently played in the back row, either as a flanker or a number 8.

Despite being viewed, including by head coach Eddie Jones', as a hooker in both England's youth and senior teams, — it is in the back row that Barbeary first took the spotlight with Wasps. In November 2021, it was reported that he would focus on the back row, with Jones' blessing.
