= 2025 mid-year rugby union tests =

Rugby union competitions

The 2025 mid-year rugby union internationals (also known as the Summer Internationals in the Northern Hemisphere) were international rugby union matches that were played during the July rugby international window. The international window saw the Argentina–England test series and the British & Irish Lions tour of Australia.

== Series and tours ==
=== Series ===
Series	Result	Winner
Australia–British & Irish Lions Test series	1–2	British & Irish Lions
Argentina–England Test series	0–2	England
Japan–Wales Test series	1–1	Draw
New Zealand–France Test series	3–0	New Zealand
South Africa–Italy Test series	2–0	South Africa

== Fixtures ==
=== 20/21 June ===
20 June 2025
20:00 IST (UTC+01)

British & Irish Lions	24–28	Argentina
Try: Aki 18' c Penalty try 45'; Beirne 52' c Con: F. Smith (2/2) 19', 53'; Pen: F. Smith (1/1) 9'	Report	Try: Mendy 11' m Albornoz 40' c Cordero 58' c Con: Albornoz (2/3) 40+1', 53'; Pen: Albornoz (3/3) 4', 25', 39'

Aviva Stadium, Dublin
Attendance: 51,700
Referee: James Doleman (New Zealand)

Team details

FB	15	(England) Marcus Smith
RW	14	(England) Tommy Freeman
OC	13	(Scotland) Sione Tuipulotu
IC	12	(Ireland) Bundee Aki	(substituted off) 59'
LW	11	(Scotland) Duhan van der Merwe	(substituted off) 59'
FH	10	(England) Fin Smith
SH	9	(England) Alex Mitchell	(substituted off) 49'
N8	8	(England) Ben Earl
OF	7	(Wales) Jac Morgan	(substituted off) 49'
BF	6	(England) Tom Curry
RL	5	(Ireland) Tadhg Beirne
LL	4	(England) Maro Itoje (c)	(substituted off) 49'
TP	3	(Ireland) Finlay Bealham	(substituted off) 59'	(substituted on) 80'
HK	2	(England) Luke Cowan-Dickie	(substituted off) 49'
LP	1	(England) Ellis Genge	(substituted off) 59'
Substitutions:
HK	16	(Ireland) Rónan Kelleher	(substituted on) 49'
PR	17	(Scotland) Pierre Schoeman	(substituted on) 59'
PR	18	(Ireland) Tadhg Furlong	(substituted on) 59'	(substituted off) 80'
LK	19	(Scotland) Scott Cummings	(substituted on) 71'
FL	20	(England) Henry Pollock	(substituted on) 49'
SH	21	(Wales) Tomos Williams	(substituted on) 49'
FB	22	(England) Elliot Daly	(substituted on) 59'
WG	23	(Ireland) Mack Hansen	(substituted on) 59'
Coach:
(England) Andy Farrell

FB	15	Santiago Carreras
RW	14	Rodrigo Isgró
OC	13	Lucio Cinti		(substituted off) 55'	(substituted on) 60'
IC	12	Justo Piccardo
LW	11	Ignacio Mendy		(substituted off) 44'
FH	10	Tomás Albornoz
SH	9	Gonzalo García		(substituted off) 70'
N8	8	Joaquín Oviedo		(substituted off) 47'	(substituted on) 56'	(substituted off) 65'
OF	7	Juan Martín González
BF	6	Pablo Matera
RL	5	Pedro Rubiolo
LL	4	Franco Molina		(substituted off) 59'
TP	3	Joel Sclavi		(substituted off) 47'
HK	2	Julián Montoya (c)		(substituted off) 80'
LP	1	Mayco Vivas	(yellow card) 45'			(substituted off) 66'
Substitutions:
HK	16	Bautista Bernasconi		(substituted on) 80'
PR	17	Boris Wenger		(substituted on) 47'	(substituted off) 56'	(substituted on) 66'
PR	18	Francisco Coria Marchetti		(substituted on) 47'
FL	19	Santiago Grondona		(substituted on) 59'
FL	20	Joaquín Moro		(substituted on) 60'
SH	21	Simón Benítez Cruz		(substituted on) 70'
CE	22	Matías Moroni		(substituted on) 55'	(substituted off) 60'
WG	23	Santiago Cordero		(substituted on) 44'
Coach:
(Argentina) Felipe Contepomi

Player of the Match:
Tomás Albornoz (Argentina)

Assistant referees:
Nika Amashukeli (Georgia)
Andrea Piardi (Italy)
Television match official:
Eric Gauzins (France)
Foul play review officer:
Matteo Liperini (Italy)

Notes:

- Finlay Bealham, Scott Cummings, Ben Earl, Tommy Freeman, Ellis Genge, Mack Hansen, Rónan Kelleher, Alex Mitchell, Jac Morgan, Henry Pollock, Pierre Schoeman, Fin Smith, Sione Tuipulotu and Tomos Williams all made their Lions debuts.
- This was Argentina's first win over the British and Irish Lions.
- Argentina won the 1888 Cup.

21 June 2025
15:00 CAT (UTC+02)

Namibia	19–59	(South Africa) Pumas
	Report

Hage Geingob Rugby Stadium, Windhoek
Referee: Johre Botha (Namibia)

21 June 2025
16:00 SAST (UTC+02)

Limpopo Blue Bulls (South Africa)	26–56	Uganda
	Report

Hoërskool Nylstroom, Modimolle

21 June 2025
15:15 BST (UTC+1)

England XV	24–26	France XV
Try: Willis 23' c Coles 27' m Carpenter 39' c Dombrandt 59' m Con: Ford (2/4) 23', 40'	Report	Try: Barlot 6' m Auradou 9' c Malez 74' c Taofifénua 80+1' c Con: Le Garrec (1/2) 10'; Hastoy (2/2) 75', 80+2'

Twickenham Stadium, London
Attendance: 34,129
Referee: Hollie Davidson (Scotland)

Team details

FB	15	Joe Carpenter		(substituted off) 60'
RW	14	Tom Roebuck
OC	13	Henry Slade
IC	12	Seb Atkinson
LW	11	Immanuel Feyi-Waboso	(red card) 33'
FH	10	George Ford (cc)
SH	9	Ben Spencer
N8	8	Tom Willis		(substituted off) 55'
OF	7	Guy Pepper		(substituted off) 60'
BF	6	Ted Hill
RL	5	Nick Isiekwe		(substituted off) 69'
LL	4	Alex Coles
TP	3	Joe Heyes		(substituted off) 60'
HK	2	Jamie George (cc)		(substituted off) 67'
LP	1	Fin Baxter		(substituted off) 54'
Substitutions:
HK	16	Theo Dan		(substituted on) 67'
PR	17	Bevan Rodd		(substituted on) 54'
PR	18	Trevor Davison		(substituted on) 60'
LK	19	Chandler Cunningham-South		(substituted on) 69'
FL	20	Jack Kenningham		(substituted on) 60'
N8	21	Alex Dombrandt		(substituted on) 55'
SH	22	Raffi Quirke		(substituted on) 60'
CE	23	Oscar Beard		(substituted on) 53'
Coach:
(England) Steve Borthwick

FB	15	Théo Attissogbe		(substituted off) 40'
RW	14	Maël Moustin		(substituted off) 46'
OC	13	Émilien Gailleton
IC	12	Gaël Fickou (c)
LW	11	Alivereti Duguivalu
FH	10	Antoine Hastoy
SH	9	Nolann Le Garrec		(substituted off) 60'
N8	8	Mickaël Guillard
OF	7	Killian Tixeront
BF	6	Alexandre Fischer
RL	5	Tyler Duguid		(substituted off) 46'	(substituted on) 77'
LL	4	Hugo Auradou		(substituted off) 46'
TP	3	Rabah Slimani		(substituted off) 46'
HK	2	Gaëtan Barlot		(substituted off) 60'
LP	1	Baptiste Erdocio		(substituted off) 46'
Substitutions:
HK	16	Guillaume Marchand		(substituted on) 60'
PR	17	Paul Mallez		(substituted on) 46'
PR	18	Demba Bamba		(substituted on) 46'
LK	19	Romain Taofifénua		(substituted on) 46'
FL	20	Cameron Woki	(red card) 55'	(substituted on) 46'
FL	21	Jacobus van Tonder		(substituted on) 46'
SH	22	Baptiste Jauneau		(substituted on) 60'
FH	23	Léo Berdeu		(substituted on) 40'
Coach:
(France) Fabien Galthié

Player of the Match:
Nolann Le Garrec (France XV)

Assistant referees:
Sam Grove-White (Scotland)
Ben Breakspear (Wales)
Television match official:
Mike Adamson (Scotland)

=== 24 June ===
24 June 2025
18:00 SAST (UTC+02)

South African Barbarians (South Africa)	24–27	Kenya
	Report

Nylstroom Rugby Club, Modimolle

=== 26 June ===
26 June 2025
18:00 SAST (UTC+02)

Limpopo Blue Bulls (South Africa)	42–35	Kenya
	Report

Nylstroom Rugby Club, Modimolle

=== 27/28 June ===
27 June 2025
14:00 SAST (UTC+02)

Pumas (South Africa)	102–0	Uganda

Nelspruit Rugby Club, Nelspruit

27 June 2025
15:00 CAT (UTC+02)

Namibia	6–73	Italy
Pen: Swanepoel (2/2) 7', 16'	Report	Try: Penalty try (2) 5', 80+3'; Trulla (3) 18' m, 40+2' c, 75' c Marin 23' c Gesi 32' c Menoncello 38' c Fusco 45' c Spagnolo 63' m Varney 70' c Con: Da Re (6/8) 24', 33', 39', 43', 46', 71'; Varney (1/1) 76'

Hage Geingob Rugby Stadium, Windhoek
Attendance: 2,000
Referee: Andrew Brace (Ireland)

Team details

FB	15	André van den Berg
RW	14	Danie van der Merwe
OC	13	Alcino Izaacs	(substituted off) 56'
IC	12	Danco Burger
LW	11	Jurgen Meyer
FH	10	Tiaan Swanepoel
SH	9	Jacques Theron	(substituted off) 72'
N8	8	Adriaan Booysen	(substituted off) 9'	(substituted on) 17'	(substituted off) 60'
OF	7	Max Katjijeko
BF	6	Prince !Gaoseb (c)
RL	5	Johan Retief	(substituted off) 72'
LL	4	Adriaan Ludick	(substituted off) 47'
TP	3	Aranos Coetzee	(substituted off) 60'
HK	2	Louis van der Westhuizen	(yellow card) 4'	(substituted off) 56'
LP	1	Haitembu Shikufa	(substituted off) 60'
Substitutions:
HK	16	Armand Combrinck	(substituted on) 9'	(substituted off) 17'	(substituted on) 56'
PR	17	Jason Benade	(substituted on) 60'
PR	18	Sidney Halupé	(substituted on) 60'
LK	19	Ruan Ludick	(substituted on) 72'
FL	20	Johan Luttig	(substituted on) 47'
FL	21	Peter Diergaardt	(substituted on) 72'
SH	22	Oela Blaauw	(substituted on) 60'
WG	23	Quiren Madjiedt	(substituted on) 56'
Coach:
(Namibia) Jacques Burger

FB	15	Jacopo Trulla
RW	14	Paolo Odogwu	(substituted off) 71'
OC	13	Tommaso Menoncello
IC	12	Leonardo Marin	(substituted off) 44'
LW	11	Simone Gesi
FH	10	Giacomo Da Re
SH	9	Alessandro Fusco	(substituted off) 54'
N8	8	Ross Vintcent
OF	7	Manuel Zuliani	(substituted off) 60'
BF	6	Sebastian Negri
RL	5	Riccardo Favretto	(substituted off) 54'
LL	4	Niccolò Cannone
TP	3	Marco Riccioni	(substituted off) 5'
HK	2	Giacomo Nicotera (c)	(substituted off) 54'
LP	1	Danilo Fischetti	(substituted off) 54'
Substitutions:
HK	16	Tommaso Di Bartolomeo	(substituted on) 54'
PR	17	Mirco Spagnolo	(substituted on) 54'
PR	18	Muhamed Hasa	(substituted on) 5'
LK	19	Andrea Zambonin	(substituted on) 54'
FL	20	Lorenzo Cannone	(substituted on) 60'
SH	21	Stephen Varney	(substituted on) 54'
FH	22	Giulio Bertaccini	(substituted on) 44'
WG	23	Mirko Belloni	(substituted on) 71'
Coach:
(Argentina) Gonzalo Quesada

Player of the Match:
Giacomo Da Re (Italy)

Assistant referees:
Morné Ferreira (South Africa)
Aimee Barrett-Theron (South Africa)

Notes:

- Sidney Halupé, Jurgen Meyer, Danie van der Merwe (all Namibia), Mirko Belloni, Tommaso Di Bartolomeo and Muhamed Hasa (all Italy) made their international debuts.

28 June 2025
18:00 JST (UTC+09)

Japan XV	20–53	Māori All Blacks
Try: Ueda (2) 9' c, 32' c Con: Greene (2/2) 10', 33'; Pen: Greene (2/2) 20', 50'	Report	Try: Forbes 23' m Wrampling 28' m Eklund 35' m McWhannell 43' c Sullivan 52' c Nock 59' c Brown 66' c Hauiti-Parapara 72' m Trask 80+1' m Con: Reihana (5/9) 44', 53', 60', 67'

Chichibunomiya Rugby Stadium, Tokyo
Referee: Karl Dickson (England)

28 June 2025
17:10 SAST (UTC+02)

South Africa	54–7	Barbarians
Try: Marx 5' m Kolbe 9' c Tshituka (2) 22' c, 69' c Wessels 45' c Arendse 57' c de Jager 59' c de Allende 80+2 c' Con: Feinberg-Mngomezulu (2/3) 10', 23'; Libbok (5/5) 46', 58', 60', 69', 80+3'	Report	Try: Jaminet 64' c Con: Jaminet (1/1) 65'

DHL Stadium, Cape Town
Attendance: 45,000
Referee: AJ Jacobs (South Africa)

Team details

FB	15	Aphelele Fassi
RW	14	Cheslin Kolbe
OC	13	Jesse Kriel (c)
IC	12	Damian de Allende
LW	11	Kurt-Lee Arendse
FH	10	Sacha Feinberg-Mngomezulu	(substituted off) 44'
SH	9	Morne van den Berg	(substituted off) 44'
N8	8	Jean-Luc du Preez	(substituted off) 38'	(substituted on) 40'	(substituted off) 44'
OF	7	Vincent Tshituka
BF	6	Marco van Staden			(substituted off) 44'
RL	5	Lood de Jager		(substituted off) 70'
LL	4	Jean Kleyn	(substituted off) 44'	(substituted on) 70'
TP	3	Asenathi Ntlabakanye	(substituted off) 44'
HK	2	Malcolm Marx	(substituted off) 44'
LP	1	Ox Nché	(substituted off) 44'
Substitutions:
HK	16	Marnus van der Merwe	(substituted on) 44'
PR	17	Jan-Hendrik Wessels	(substituted on) 44'
PR	18	Neethling Fouche	(substituted on) 44'
LK	19	Franco Mostert	(substituted on) 44'
FL	20	Kwagga Smith	(substituted on) 38'	(substituted off) 40'	(substituted on) 44'
SH	21	Cobus Reinach	(substituted on) 44'
FH	22	Manie Libbok	(substituted on) 44'
CE	23	André Esterhuizen	(substituted on) 44'
Coach:
(South Africa) Rassie Erasmus

FB	15	(France) Melvyn Jaminet
RW	14	(New Zealand) Jacob Ratumaitavuki-Kneepkens
OC	13	(New Zealand) Leicester Fainga'anuku
IC	12	(New Zealand) Peter Umaga-Jensen
LW	11	(New Zealand) Mark Telea	(substituted off) 63'
FH	10	(New Zealand) Josh Jacomb
SH	9	(New Zealand) Tawera Kerr-Barlow	(substituted off) 47'
N8	8	(New Zealand) Shannon Frizell	(substituted off) 52'
OF	7	(New Zealand) Sam Cane	(substituted off) 47'
BF	6	(Ireland) Peter O'Mahony (c)	(substituted off) 61'
RL	5	(England) David Ribbans
LL	4	(South Africa) Ruben van Heerden
TP	3	(Samoa) Paul Alo-Emile	(substituted off) 47'
HK	2	(France) Camille Chat	(substituted off) 47'
LP	1	(Ireland) Cian Healy	(substituted off) 47'
Substitutions:
HK	16	(New Zealand) Ricky Riccitelli	(substituted on) 47'
PR	17	(France) Hassane Kolingar	(substituted on) 47'
PR	18	(England) Will Collier	(substituted on) 47'
LK	19	(New Zealand) Josh Beehre	(substituted on) 61'
FL	20	(New Zealand) Hoskins Sotutu	(substituted on) 52'
SH	21	(Uruguay) Santiago Arata	(substituted on) 47'
CE	22	(England) Joe Marchant	(substituted on) 63'
FL	23	(New Zealand) Lachlan Boshier	(substituted on) 47'
Coach:
(New Zealand) Robbie Deans

Assistant referees:
Christopher Allison (South Africa)
Stephan Geldenhuys (South Africa)
Television match official:
Egon Seconds (South Africa)
Foul play review officer:
Ben Crouse (South Africa)

=== 5/6 July ===
5 July 2025
15:35 NZST (UTC+12)

Māori All Blacks	26–29	Scotland
Try: Nock 1' m Walker-Leawere 31' c Eklund 57' c Wrampling 67' c Con: Reihana (2/3) 32', 58'; Trask (1/1) 68'	Report	Try: Paterson 11' c Horne (2) 24' c, 53' m Reed 40' c Con: Hastings (3/4) 12', 25', 40'; Pen: Hastings (1/1) 16'

Okara Park, Whangārei
Attendance: 10,150
Referee: Nika Amashukeli (Georgia)

Team details

FB	15	Zarn Sullivan
RW	14	Cole Forbes		(substituted off) 58'
OC	13	Bailyn Sullivan	(yellow card) 47'
IC	12	Gideon Wrampling
LW	11	Daniel Rona
FH	10	Rivez Reihana		(substituted off) 58'	(substituted on) 66'
SH	9	Sam Nock		(substituted off) 70'
N8	8	Cullen Grace
OF	7	Jahrome Brown		(substituted off) 68'
BF	6	TK Howden	(yellow card) 44'
RL	5	Isaia Walker-Leawere
LL	4	Antonio Shalfoon		(substituted off) 54'
TP	3	Kershawl Sykes-Martin		(substituted off) 54'
HK	2	Kurt Eklund (c)		(substituted off) 64'
LP	1	Jared Proffit		(substituted off) 54'
Substitutions:
HK	16	Jacob Devery		(substituted on) 64'
PR	17	Pouri Rakete-Stones		(substituted on) 54'
PR	18	Benet Kumeroa		(substituted on) 54'
LK	19	Laghlan McWhannell		(substituted on) 54'
FL	20	Caleb Delany		(substituted on) 68'
SH	21	Kemara Hauiti-Parapara		(substituted on) 70'
FH	22	Kaleb Trask		(substituted on) 58'	(substituted off) 66'
CE	23	Corey Evans		(substituted on) 58'
Coach:
(New Zealand) Ross Filipo

FB	15	Ollie Smith
RW	14	Harry Paterson
OC	13	Rory Hutchinson
IC	12	Stafford McDowall (c)
LW	11	Arron Reed
FH	10	Adam Hastings		(substituted off) 63'
SH	9	George Horne		(substituted off) 63'
N8	8	Ben Muncaster		(substituted off) 29'
OF	7	Andy Onyeama-Christie		(substituted off) 70'
BF	6	Josh Bayliss
RL	5	Cameron Henderson	(yellow card) 80'
LL	4	Marshall Sykes		(substituted off) 51'
TP	3	Fin Richardson		(substituted off) 51'
HK	2	Patrick Harrison		(substituted off) 51'
LP	1	Nathan McBeth		(substituted off) 51'
Substitutions:
HK	16	George Turner		(substituted on) 51'
PR	17	Alec Hepburn		(substituted on) 51'
PR	18	Will Hurd		(substituted on) 51'
LK	19	Max Williamson		(substituted on) 51'
LK	20	Gregor Brown		(substituted on) 70'
FL	21	Alex Masibaka	(yellow card) 31'	(substituted on) 29'
FH	22	Fergus Burke		(substituted on) 63'
SH	23	Jamie Dobie		(substituted on) 63'
Coach:
(Scotland) Gregor Townsend

Assistant referees:
Jordan Way (Australia)
Matt Kellahan (Australia)
Television match official:
Oli Kellett (Australia)

5 July 2025
14:00 JST (UTC+09)

Japan	24–19	Wales
Try: Matsunaga 16' c Nakakusu 59' c Vailea 70' c Con: Seung-sin (3/3) 17', 60', 71'; Pen: Seung-sin (1/1) 64'	Report	Try: B. Thomas 4' c Penalty try 20'; T. Rogers 22' m Con: Costelow (1/2) 5'

Mikuni World Stadium, Kitakyushu
Attendance: 13,487
Referee: Damian Schneider (Argentina)

Team details

FB	15	Takuro Matsunaga		(substituted off) 19'
RW	14	Kippei Ishida
OC	13	Dylan Riley
IC	12	Shōgo Nakano
LW	11	Malo Tuitama		(substituted off) 51'
FH	10	Lee Seung-sin
SH	9	Shinobu Fujiwara		(substituted off) 79'
N8	8	Amato Fakatava		(substituted off) 56'
OF	7	Jack Cornelsen
BF	6	Michael Leitch (c)
RL	5	Warner Dearns
LL	4	Epineri Uluiviti		(substituted off) 56'
TP	3	Shuhei Takeuchi
HK	2	Mamoru Harada
LP	1	Yota Kamimori
Substitutions:
HK	16	Hayate Era
PR	17	Sena Kimura
PR	18	Keijiro Tamefusa
LK	19	Waisake Raratubua		(substituted on) 56'
FL	20	Ben Gunter		(substituted on) 56'
SH	21	Shuntaro Kitamura		(substituted on) 79'
FH	22	Ichigo Nakakusu	(yellow card) 20'	(substituted on) 19'
FB	23	Halatoa Vailea		(substituted on) 51'
Coach:
(Australia) Eddie Jones

FB	15	Blair Murray
RW	14	Tom Rogers
OC	13	Johnny Williams	(substituted off) 68'
IC	12	Ben Thomas
LW	11	Josh Adams
FH	10	Sam Costelow
SH	9	Kieran Hardy
N8	8	Taulupe Faletau	(substituted off) 57'
OF	7	Josh Macleod	(substituted off) 57'
BF	6	Alex Mann
RL	5	Teddy Williams
LL	4	Ben Carter	(substituted off) 1'
TP	3	Keiron Assiratti	(substituted off) 51'
HK	2	Dewi Lake (c)	(substituted off) 68'
LP	1	Nicky Smith	(substituted off) 51'
Substitutions:
HK	16	Liam Belcher	(substituted on) 68'
PR	17	Gareth Thomas	(substituted on) 51'
PR	18	Archie Griffin	(substituted on) 51'
FL	19	James Ratti	(substituted on) 1'
FL	20	Aaron Wainwright	(substituted on) 57'
FL	21	Tommy Reffell	(substituted on) 57'
SH	22	Rhodri Williams
CE	23	Joe Roberts	(substituted on) 68'
Coach:
(England) Matt Sherratt

Player of the Match:
Mamoru Harada (Japan)

Assistant referees:
Karl Dickson (England)
Luke Pearce (England)
Television match official:
Ian Tempest (England)
Foul play review officer:
Glenn Newman (New Zealand)

Notes:

- Ichigo Nakakusu, Kippei Ishida, Yota Kamimori, Shuntaro Kitamura, Waisake Raratubua, Halatoa Vailea (all Japan) and Liam Belcher (Wales) made their international debuts.

5 July 2025
19:05 NZST (UTC+12)

New Zealand	31–27	France
Try: Jordan (2) 20' c, 47' c Vaa'i 26' c J. Barrett 40' c Con: B. Barrett (4/4) 21', 27', 40', 48'; Pen: B. Barrett (1/1) 74'	Report	Try: Guillard 17' c Villière 43' c Woki 50' c Con: Le Garrec (3/3) 18', 44', 50'; Pen: Segonds (1/1) 7'; Le Garrec (1/1) 33'

Forsyth Barr Stadium, Dunedin
Attendance: 28,532
Referee: Nic Berry (Australia)

Team details

FB	15	Will Jordan
RW	14	Sevu Reece	(substituted off) 1'
OC	13	Billy Proctor	(substituted off) 66'
IC	12	Jordie Barrett
LW	11	Rieko Ioane
FH	10	Beauden Barrett
SH	9	Cam Roigard	(substituted off) 60'
N8	8	Christian Lio-Willie	(substituted off) 51'
OF	7	Ardie Savea
BF	6	Tupou Vaa'i
RL	5	Fabian Holland
LL	4	Scott Barrett (c)	(substituted off) 58'
TP	3	Fletcher Newell	(substituted off) 56'
HK	2	Codie Taylor	(substituted off) 58'
LP	1	Ethan de Groot	(substituted off) 56'
Substitutions:
HK	16	Samisoni Taukei'aho	(substituted on) 58'
PR	17	Ollie Norris	(substituted on) 56'
PR	18	Pasilio Tosi	(substituted on) 56'
FL	19	Samipeni Finau	(substituted on) 58'
FL	20	Du'Plessis Kirifi	(substituted on) 51'
SH	21	Cortez Ratima	(substituted on) 60'
CE	22	Quinn Tupaea	(substituted on) 66'
FH	23	Damian McKenzie	(substituted on) 1'
Coach:
(New Zealand) Scott Robertson

FB	15	Théo Attissogbé
RW	14	Tom Spring		(substituted off) 72'
OC	13	Émilien Gailleton
IC	12	Gaël Fickou (c)
LW	11	Gabin Villière	(yellow card) 55'
FH	10	Joris Segonds		(substituted off) 64'
SH	9	Nolann Le Garrec		(substituted off) 58'
N8	8	Mickaël Guillard
OF	7	Killian Tixeront		(substituted off) 48'
BF	6	Alexandre Fischer
RL	5	Tyler Duguid		(substituted off) 48'
LL	4	Hugo Auradou		(substituted off) 48'
TP	3	Rabah Slimani		(substituted off) 48'
HK	2	Gaëtan Barlot		(substituted off) 56'
LP	1	Giorgi Beria		(substituted off) 48'
Substitutions:
HK	16	Pierre Bourgarit		(substituted on) 56'
PR	17	Paul Mallez		(substituted on) 48'
PR	18	Régis Montagne		(substituted on) 48'
LK	19	Romain Taofifénua		(substituted on) 48'
LK	20	Cameron Woki		(substituted on) 48'
FL	21	Jacobus van Tonder		(substituted on) 48'
SH	22	Baptiste Jauneau		(substituted on) 58'
FH	23	Antoine Hastoy		(substituted on) 64'
Coach:
(France) Fabien Galthié

Player of the Match:
Will Jordan (New Zealand)

Assistant referees:
Christophe Ridley (England)
Takehito Namekawa (Japan)
Television match official:
Damon Murphy (Australia)
Foul play review officer:
Brett Cronan (Australia)

Notes:

- Fabian Holland, Du'Plessis Kirifi, Christian Lio-Willie, Ollie Norris (all New Zealand), Giorgi Beria, Tyler Duguid, Paul Mallez, Régis Montagne, Joris Segonds, Tom Spring and Jacobus van Tonder (all France) made their international debuts.

5 July 2025
17:10 SAST (UTC+02)

South Africa	42–24	Italy
Try: Kriel 11' c van den Berg (2) 23' c, 37' c Arendse 30' c Koch 57' c van Staden 73' c Con: Pollard (6/6) 12', 23', 31', 38', 58', 74'	Report	Try: Zuliani 46' c Dimcheff 63' c N. Cannone 68' c Con: Da Re (3/3) 47', 64', 69'; Pen: Da Re (1/1) 28'

Loftus Versfeld Stadium, Pretoria
Attendance: 42,632
Referee: Hollie Davidson (Scotland)

Team details

FB	15	Damian Willemse
RW	14	Cheslin Kolbe
OC	13	Jesse Kriel (c)
IC	12	Damian de Allende	(substituted off) 63'
LW	11	Kurt-Lee Arendse
FH	10	Handré Pollard
SH	9	Morné van den Berg	(substituted off) 55'
N8	8	Jasper Wiese	(substituted off) 55'
OF	7	Vincent Tshituka
BF	6	Marco van Staden
RL	5	Lood de Jager	(substituted off) 48'
LL	4	Eben Etzebeth	(substituted off) 48'
TP	3	Wilco Louw	(substituted off) 48'
HK	2	Malcolm Marx	(substituted off) 48'
LP	1	Ox Nché	(substituted off) 48'
Substitutions:
HK	16	Bongi Mbonambi	(substituted on) 48'
PR	17	Jan-Hendrik Wessels	(substituted on) 48'
PR	18	Vincent Koch	(substituted on) 48'
LK	19	RG Snyman	(substituted on) 48'
LK	20	Franco Mostert	(substituted on) 48'
FL	21	Kwagga Smith	(substituted on) 55'
SH	22	Faf de Klerk	(substituted on) 55'
FB	23	Willie le Roux	(substituted on) 63'
Coach:
(South Africa) Rassie Erasmus

FB	15	Jacopo Trulla
RW	14	Louis Lynagh
OC	13	Tommaso Menoncello
IC	12	Marco Zanon
LW	11	Simone Gesi
FH	10	Giacomo Da Re
SH	9	Alessandro Fusco		(substituted off) 55'
N8	8	Lorenzo Cannone	(yellow card) 23'	(substituted off) 48'
OF	7	Manuel Zuliani		(substituted off) 59'
BF	6	Alessandro Izekor	(yellow card) 74'
RL	5	Andrea Zambonin		(substituted off) 62'
LL	4	Niccolò Cannone (c)
TP	3	Simone Ferrari		(substituted off) 31'	(substituted on) 55'
HK	2	Tommaso Di Bartolomeo		(substituted off) 62'
LP	1	Danilo Fischetti		(substituted off) 55'
Substitutions:
HK	16	Pablo Dimcheff		(substituted on) 62'
PR	17	Mirco Spagnolo		(substituted on) 55'
PR	18	Muhamed Hasa		(substituted on) 31'	(substituted off) 55'
LK	19	Matteo Canali		(substituted on) 62'
N8	20	Ross Vintcent		(substituted on) 48'
FL	21	David Odiase		(substituted on) 59'
SH	22	Alessandro Garbisi		(substituted on) 55'
CE	23	Giulio Bertaccini		(substituted on) 77'
Coach:
(Argentina) Gonzalo Quesada

Player of the Match:
Vincent Tshituka (South Africa)

Assistant referees:
Matthew Carley (England)
Andrew Brace (Ireland)
Television match official:
Andrew Jackson (England)
Foul play review officer:
Tual Trainini (France)

Notes:

- Vincent Tshituka (South Africa), Matteo Canali, Pablo Dimcheff and David Odiase (all Italy) made their international debuts.

5 July 2025
21:00 GET (UTC+4)

Georgia	5–34	Ireland
Try: Jalaghonia 40+5' m	Report	Try: T. O'Brien (2) 2' c, 8' c Casey 41' c Timoney 70' c Con: Prendergast (4/4) 3', 9', 42', 71'; Pen: Prendergast (2/2) 45', 62'

Mikheil Meskhi Stadium, Tbilisi
Attendance: 25,000
Referee: Andrea Piardi (Italy)

Team details

FB	15	Davit Niniashvili
RW	14	Aka Tabutsadze
OC	13	Demur Tapladze	(substituted off) 61'
IC	12	Giorgi Kveseladze
LW	11	Alexander Todua
FH	10	Luka Matkava
SH	9	Vasil Lobzhanidze
N8	8	Tornike Jalaghonia	(substituted off) 55'
OF	7	Beka Saghinadze (c)
BF	6	Luka Ivanishvili	(substituted off) 78'
RL	5	Lado Chachanidze
LL	4	Mikheil Babunashvili
TP	3	Irakli Aptsiauri	(substituted off) 55'
HK	2	Vano Karkadze	(substituted off) 55'
LP	1	Giorgi Akhaladze	(substituted off) 55'
Substitutions:
HK	16	Irakli Kvatadze	(substituted on) 55'
PR	17	Giorgi Tetrashvili	(substituted on) 55'
PR	18	Beka Gigashvili	(substituted on) 55'
LK	19	Giorgi Javakhia	(substituted on) 78'
FL	20	Ilia Spanderashvili	(substituted on) 55'
SH	21	Mikheil Alania
FH	22	Tedo Abzhandadze
CE	23	Tornike Kakhoidze	(substituted on) 61'
Coach:
(England) Richard Cockerill

FB	15	Jimmy O'Brien
RW	14	Tommy O'Brien
OC	13	Jamie Osborne
IC	12	Stuart McCloskey	(yellow card) 78'
LW	11	Jacob Stockdale		(substituted off) 37'
FH	10	Sam Prendergast		(substituted off) 71'
SH	9	Craig Casey (c)		(substituted off) 71'
N8	8	Gavin Coombes		(substituted off) 66'
OF	7	Nick Timoney
BF	6	Ryan Baird
RL	5	Darragh Murray
LL	4	Cormac Izuchukwu		(substituted off) 62'
TP	3	Tom Clarkson		(substituted off) 69'
HK	2	Gus McCarthy		(substituted off) 59'
LP	1	Jack Boyle		(substituted off) 59'
Substitutions:
HK	16	Tom Stewart		(substituted on) 59'
PR	17	Michael Milne		(substituted on) 59'
PR	18	Jack Aungier		(substituted on) 69'
LK	19	Thomas Ahern		(substituted on) 62'
FL	20	Max Deegan		(substituted on) 66'
SH	21	Ben Murphy		(substituted on) 71'
FH	22	Jack Crowley		(substituted on) 71'
WG	23	Calvin Nash		(substituted on) 36'
Coach:
(Ireland) Paul O'Connell

Assistant referees:
Adam Leal (England)
Ben Whitehouse (Wales)
Television match official:
Matteo Liperini (Italy)

Notes:

- Thomas Ahern, Jack Aungier, Michael Milne, Ben Murphy, Darragh Murray, Tommy O'Brien (all Ireland) made their international debuts.

5 July 2025
14:00 BRT (UTC-3)

Brazil	17–45	Argentina XV
Try: Moreno 19' m de Melo (2) 53' c, 75' m Con: Duque (1/2) 54'	Report	Try: D’Amorim 4' c Medina 9' m Vivas 12' c Cipriani 16' m Farisé 39' c Greising Revol 62' c Bildosola 68' c Con: Farisé (3/5) 5', 13', 40'; Baroni (2/2) 63', 69'

Estádio Municipal Du Cambusano, Jacareí
Referee: Robin Kaluzniak (Canada)

5 July 2025
15:00 CST (UTC-4)

Chile	40–16	Romania
Try: D. Escobar 3' m N. Garafulic (2) 18' c, 74' c Ayarza 25' m A. Escobar 60' c Con: Videla (3/5) 19', 61', 75'; Pen: Videla (3/3) 11', 17', 55'	Report	Try: Maftei 35' c Con: Boldor (1/1) 36'; Pen: Conache (2/2) 7', 13'; Boldor (1/1) 51'

Estadio Nacional, Santiago
Referee: Federico Vedovelli (Italy)

Team details

FB	15	Cristóbal Game	(yellow card) 35'	(substituted off) 75'
RW	14	Nicolás Garafulic
OC	13	Matías Garafulic
IC	12	Santiago Videla
LW	11	Iñaki Ayarza
FH	10	Rodrigo Fernández		(substituted off) 70'
SH	9	Lucas Berti
N8	8	Alfonso Escobar		(substituted off) 77'
OF	7	Clemente Saavedra (c)
BF	6	Raimundo Martínez
RL	5	Javier Eissmann		(substituted off) 75'
LL	4	Santiago Pedrero
TP	3	Iñaki Gurruchaga		(substituted off) 70'
HK	2	Diego Escobar		(substituted off) 77'
LP	1	Javier Carrasco		(substituted off) 64'
Substitutions:
HK	16	Salvador Lues		(substituted on) 77'
PR	17	Norman Aguayo		(substituted on) 64'
PR	18	Matías Dittus		(substituted on) 70'
LK	19	Bruno Sáez		(substituted on) 75'
FL	20	Augusto Villanueva
SH	21	Juan Cruz Reyes		(substituted on) 70'
CE	22	Nicolás Saab		(substituted on) 75'
FL	23	Santiago Valenzuela		(substituted on) 77'
Coach:
(Uruguay) Pablo Lemoine

FB	15	Ovidiu Neagu		(substituted off) 51'
RW	14	Toni Maftei		(substituted off) 62'
OC	13	Antonio Mitrea
IC	12	Fonovai Tangimana	(yellow card) 44'
LW	11	Taliaʻuli Sikuea
FH	10	Tudor Boldor
SH	9	Alin Conache		(substituted off) 35'
N8	8	Nicolaas Immelman			(substituted off) 64'
OF	7	Matthew Tweddle
BF	6	Cristi Boboc (c)		(substituted off) 56'
RL	5	Andrei Mahu
LL	4	Adrian Moțoc		(substituted off) 56'
TP	3	Gheorghe Gajion		(substituted off) 64'
HK	2	Tudor Butnariu		(substituted off) 51'	(substituted on) 64'
LP	1	Alexandru Savin		(substituted off) 51'
Substitutions:
HK	16	Ștefan Buruiană	(red card) 58'	(substituted on) 51'
PR	17	Iulian Harțig		(substituted on) 51'
PR	18	Thomas Crețu		(substituted on) 64'
LK	19	Yanis Horvat		(substituted on) 56'
FL	20	Vlad Neculau		(substituted on) 56'
SH	21	Vladut Bocanet		(substituted on) 35'
CE	22	Alexandru Bucur		(substituted on) 62'
WG	23	Romeo Corrado-Ștețco		(substituted on) 51'
Coach:
(France) David Gérard

Player of the Match:
Nicolás Garafulic (Chile)

Assistant referees:
Francisco Gonzalez (Uruguay)
Gonzalo De Achaval (Argentina)
Television match official:
Marcelo Pilaro (Argentina)

Notes:

- Santiago Valenzuela (Chile), Antonio Mitrea and Toni Maftei (both Romania) made their international debuts.

5 July 2025
16:40 ART (UTC-03)

Argentina	12–35	England
Try: Matera 52' m Rubiolo 61' c Con: Carreras (1/2) 62'	Report	Try: Roebuck (2) 42' m, 49' c Steward 46' c Murley 75' c Con: Ford (3/4) 47', 50', 76'; Pen: Ford (2/2) 65', 69'; Drop: Ford (1/1) 20'

Estadio Jorge Luis Hirschi, La Plata
Attendance: 32,000
Referee: Angus Gardner (Australia)

Team details

FB	15	Benjamín Elizalde	(substituted off) 62'
RW	14	Rodrigo Isgró
OC	13	Lucio Cinti
IC	12	Justo Piccardo
LW	11	Santiago Cordero	(substituted off) 63'
FH	10	Santiago Carreras
SH	9	Gonzalo Bertranou	(substituted off) 50'
N8	8	Facundo Isa	(substituted off) 50'
OF	7	Juan Martín González
BF	6	Pablo Matera
RL	5	Pedro Rubiolo
LL	4	Lucas Paulos	(substituted off) 54'
TP	3	Pedro Delgado	(substituted off) 46'
HK	2	Julián Montoya (c)	(substituted off) 72'
LP	1	Mayco Vivas	(substituted off) 46'
Substitutions:
HK	16	Bautista Bernasconi	(substituted on) 72'
PR	17	Thomas Gallo	(substituted on) 46'
PR	18	Francisco Coria Marchetti	(substituted on) 46'
FL	19	Santiago Grondona	(substituted on) 54'
FL	20	Joaquín Moro	(substituted on) 50'
SH	21	Simón Benítez Cruz	(substituted on) 50'
FH	22	Nicolas Roger	(substituted on) 62'
CE	23	Matías Moroni	(substituted on) 63'
Coach:
(Argentina) Felipe Contepomi

FB	15	Freddie Steward
RW	14	Tom Roebuck		(substituted off) 62'
OC	13	Henry Slade
IC	12	Seb Atkinson	(yellow card) 22'	(substituted off) 62'
LW	11	Will Muir
FH	10	George Ford (cc)
SH	9	Ben Spencer		(substituted off) 57'
N8	8	Tom Willis		(substituted off) 62'
OF	7	Sam Underhill		(substituted off) 62'
BF	6	Ben Curry
RL	5	Alex Coles	(yellow card) 15'
LL	4	Charlie Ewels		(substituted off) 50'	(substituted on) 64'
TP	3	Joe Heyes		(substituted off) 57'
HK	2	Jamie George (cc)		(substituted off) 76'
LP	1	Fin Baxter		(substituted off) 57'
Substitutions:
HK	16	Theo Dan		(substituted on) 76'
PR	17	Bevan Rodd		(substituted on) 57'
PR	18	Asher Opoku-Fordjour		(substituted on) 57'
FL	19	Chandler Cunningham-South		(substituted on) 50'	(substituted off) 64'
FL	20	Guy Pepper		(substituted on) 62'
N8	21	Alex Dombrandt		(substituted on) 61'
SH	22	Jack van Poortvliet		(substituted on) 57'
WG	23	Cadan Murley		(substituted on) 62'
Coach:
(England) Steve Borthwick

Player of the Match:
Tom Roebuck (England)

Assistant referees:
Luc Ramos (France)
Gianluca Gnecchi (Italy)
Television match official:
Olly Hodges (Ireland)
Foul play review officer:
Mike Adamson (Scotland)

Notes:

- Bautista Bernasconi, Simón Benítez Cruz, Benjamín Elizalde, Nicolas Roger (all Argentina), Seb Atkinson, Will Muir and Guy Pepper (all England) made their international debuts.

5 July 2025
19:30 EDT (UTC-04)

United States	36–17	Belgium
Try: Besag 23' c Helu 38' c Lopeti 50' c Alikhan 57' c Daniel 60' m Bonasso 69' c Con: MacGinty (3/5) 24', 39', 58'	Report	Try: Remue 42' c Torfs 76' c Con: De Francq (1/1) 43'; Torfs (1/1) 77'; Pen: De Francq (1/1) 13'

American Legion Memorial Stadium, Charlotte
Referee: Sam Grove-White (Scotland)

6 July 2025
13:30 AEST (UTC+10)

Australia	21–18	Fiji
Try: Porecki 9' c McReight 39' c Wilson 78' c Con: Lolesio (2/2) 10', 40'; Donaldson (1/1) 79'	Report	Try: Rayasi 40' m Tagitagivalu 55' c Con: Muntz (1/2) 55'; Pen: Muntz (2/2) 51', 68'

McDonald Jones Stadium, Newcastle
Attendance: 28,122
Referee: Pierre Brousset (France)

Team details

FB	15	Tom Wright
RW	14	Harry Potter
OC	13	Joseph Sua'ali'i
IC	12	Len Ikitau	(substituted off) 65'
LW	11	Max Jorgensen
FH	10	Noah Lolesio	(substituted off) 61'
SH	9	Tate McDermott	(substituted off) 56'
N8	8	Harry Wilson (c)
OF	7	Fraser McReight
BF	6	Langi Gleeson	(substituted off) 58'
RL	5	Jeremy Williams	(substituted off) 65'
LL	4	Nick Frost
TP	3	Allan Alaalatoa	(substituted off) 61'
HK	2	Dave Porecki	(substituted off) 28'
LP	1	James Slipper	(substituted off) 16'	(substituted on) 27'	(substituted off) 56'
Substitutions:
HK	16	Billy Pollard	(substituted on) 28'
PR	17	Angus Bell	(substituted on) 16'	(substituted off) 27'	(substituted on) 56'
PR	18	Zane Nonggorr	(substituted on) 61'
LK	19	Tom Hooper	(substituted on) 65'
FL	20	Carlo Tizzano	(substituted on) 58'
SH	21	Nic White	(substituted on) 56'
FH	22	Ben Donaldson	(substituted on) 61'
WG	23	Filipo Daugunu	(substituted on) 65'
Coach:
(New Zealand) Joe Schmidt

FB	15	Salesi Rayasi	(substituted off) 71'
RW	14	Kalaveti Ravouvou
OC	13	Iosefo Masi	(substituted off) 51'
IC	12	Josua Tuisova
LW	11	Jiuta Wainiqolo	(substituted off) 77'
FH	10	Caleb Muntz
SH	9	Simione Kuruvoli	(substituted off) 70'
N8	8	Viliame Mata	(substituted off) 65'
OF	7	Elia Canakaivata	(substituted off) 51'
BF	6	Lekima Tagitagivalu
RL	5	Temo Mayanavanua
LL	4	Isoa Nasilasila
TP	3	Peni Ravai	(substituted off) 49'
HK	2	Tevita Ikanivere (c)	(substituted off) 51'
LP	1	Eroni Mawi	(substituted off) 51'
Substitutions:
HK	16	Sam Matavesi	(substituted on) 51'
PR	17	Haereiti Hetet	(substituted on) 51'
PR	18	Mesake Doge	(substituted on) 49'
LK	19	Mesake Vocevoce	(substituted on) 77'
N8	20	Albert Tuisue	(substituted on) 51'
SH	21	Philip Baselala	(substituted on) 70'
FH	22	Isaiah Armstrong-Ravula	(substituted on) 71'
FB	23	Sireli Maqala	(substituted on) 51'
Coach:
(Australia) Mick Byrne

Assistant referees:
Ben O'Keeffe (New Zealand)
Angus Mabey (New Zealand)
Television match official:
Eric Gauzins (France)
Foul play review officer:
Richard Kelly (New Zealand)

Notes:

- Philip Baselala and Salesi Rayasi (both Fiji) made their international debuts.
- Australia won the Vuvale Bowl.

=== 11/12 July ===
11 July 2025
19:00 SAST (UTC+02)

Cheetahs (South Africa)	24–20	Georgia
Try: Makhaza (2) 18' c, 73' c Britz 29' c Con: Jasper (3/3) 19', 30', 74'; Pen: Jasper (1/1) 46'	Report	Try: Aptsiauri (2) 39' c, 42' c Con: Abzhandadze (2/2) 40', 42'; Pen: Abzhandadze (2/2) 60', 64'

Toyota Stadium, Bloemfontein
Referee: Christopher Allison (South Africa)

12 July 2025
15:00 FJT (UTC+12)

Fiji	29–14	Scotland
Try: Ikanivere 36' m Ravouvou 40' c Wainiqolo 59' c Penalty try 67'; Con: Muntz (2/3) 40+1', 60'; Pen: Muntz (1/1) 21'	Report	Try: Rowe 3' c Jordan 44' c Con: Burke (2/2) 4', 45'

HFC Bank Stadium, Suva
Attendance: 10,000
Referee: Ben O'Keeffe (New Zealand)

Team details

FB	15	Salesi Rayasi	(substituted off) 55'
RW	14	Kalaveti Ravouvou
OC	13	Sireli Maqala
IC	12	Josua Tuisova	(substituted off) 66'
LW	11	Jiuta Wainiqolo
FH	10	Caleb Muntz
SH	9	Simione Kuruvoli	(substituted off) 72'
N8	8	Viliame Mata	(substituted off) 67'
OF	7	Elia Canakaivata
BF	6	Lekima Tagitagivalu
RL	5	Temo Mayanavanua
LL	4	Isoa Nasilasila	(substituted off) 67'
TP	3	Mesake Doge	(substituted off) 51'
HK	2	Tevita Ikanivere (c)	(substituted off) 55'
LP	1	Eroni Mawi	(substituted off) 55'
Substitutions:
HK	16	Sam Matavesi	(substituted on) 55'
PR	17	Haereiti Hetet	(substituted on) 55'
PR	18	Samu Tawake	(substituted on) 51'
LK	19	Mesake Vocevoce	(substituted on) 67'
N8	20	Albert Tuisue	(substituted on) 67'
SH	21	Sam Wye	(substituted on) 72'
FH	22	Isaiah Armstrong-Ravula	(substituted on) 55'
FB	23	Vilimoni Botitu
Coach:
(Australia) Mick Byrne

FB	15	Kyle Rowe
RW	14	Darcy Graham	(yellow card) 33' (red card) 67'
OC	13	Cameron Redpath		(substituted off) 55'
IC	12	Tom Jordan
LW	11	Kyle Steyn
FH	10	Fergus Burke
SH	9	Jamie Dobie		(substituted off) 58'
N8	8	Matt Fagerson		(substituted off) 72'
OF	7	Rory Darge (c)
BF	6	Jamie Ritchie		(substituted off) 22'
RL	5	Grant Gilchrist
LL	4	Marshall Sykes		(substituted off) 56'
TP	3	Elliot Millar-Mills		(substituted off) 58'
HK	2	Ewan Ashman	(yellow card) 10'	(substituted off) 58'
LP	1	Rory Sutherland		(substituted off) 57'
Substitutions:
HK	16	George Turner		(substituted on) 58'
PR	17	Alec Hepburn		(substituted on) 57'
PR	18	Will Hurd		(substituted on) 58'
LK	19	Max Williamson		(substituted on) 56'
FL	20	Josh Bayliss		(substituted on) 22'
SH	21	George Horne		(substituted on) 58'
FH	22	Adam Hastings		(substituted on) 72'
FB	23	Ollie Smith		(substituted on) 55'
Coach:
(Scotland) Gregor Townsend

Assistant referees:
Jordan Way (Australia)
Matt Kellahan (Australia)
Television match official:
Richard Kelly (New Zealand)

Notes:

- Sam Wye (Fiji) and Fergus Burke (Scotland) made their international debuts.

12 July 2025
14:50 JST (UTC+09)

Japan	22–31	Wales
Try: Takeuchi 40' c Dearns 59' m Riley 62' c Con: Seung-sin (2/3) 40+1', 63'; Pen: Seung-sin (1/1) 24'	Report	Try: Adams 9' c Hardy (2) 28' c, 36' c Edwards 75' c Con: Edwards (4/4) 10', 29', 37', 76'; Pen: Edwards (1/1) 49'

Noevir Stadium, Kobe
Attendance: 25,074
Referee: Luke Pearce (England)

Team details

FB	15	Ichigo Nakakusu	(substituted off) 56'
RW	14	Kippei Ishida
OC	13	Dylan Riley
IC	12	Shōgo Nakano
LW	11	Halatoa Vailea
FH	10	Lee Seung-sin
SH	9	Naoto Saitō	(substituted off) 56'
N8	8	Faulua Makisi	(substituted off) 53'
OF	7	Jack Cornelsen
BF	6	Michael Leitch (c)
RL	5	Warner Dearns
LL	4	Epineri Uluiviti	(substituted off) 40'
TP	3	Keijiro Tamefusa	(substituted off) 37'
HK	2	Mamoru Harada	(substituted off) 37'
LP	1	Yota Kamimori	(substituted off) 37'
Substitutions:
HK	16	Hayate Era	(substituted on) 37'
PR	17	Sena Kimura	(substituted on) 37'
PR	18	Shuhei Takeuchi	(substituted on) 37'
LK	19	Waisake Raratubua	(substituted on) 40'
FL	20	Ben Gunter	(substituted on) 53'
SH	21	Shinobu Fujiwara	(substituted on) 56'
FH	22	Sam Greene	(substituted on) 56'
WG	23	Kazuma Ueda
Coach:
(Australia) Eddie Jones

FB	15	Blair Murray
RW	14	Tom Rogers
OC	13	Johnny Williams	(substituted off) 65'
IC	12	Ben Thomas
LW	11	Josh Adams	(substituted off) 40'
FH	10	Dan Edwards
SH	9	Kieran Hardy
N8	8	Aaron Wainwright
OF	7	Josh Macleod	(substituted off) 76'
BF	6	Alex Mann	(substituted off) 49'
RL	5	Teddy Williams
LL	4	Freddie Thomas	(substituted off) 67'
TP	3	Archie Griffin	(substituted off) 60'
HK	2	Dewi Lake (c)	(substituted off) 60'
LP	1	Nicky Smith	(substituted off) 40'
Substitutions:
HK	16	Liam Belcher	(substituted on) 60'
PR	17	Gareth Thomas	(substituted on) 40'
PR	18	Christian Coleman	(substituted on) 60'
FL	19	James Ratti	(substituted on) 67'
N8	20	Taine Plumtree	(substituted on) 49'
FL	21	Tommy Reffell	(substituted on) 76'
SH	22	Reuben Morgan-Williams	(substituted on) 65'
WG	23	Keelan Giles	(substituted on) 40'
Coach:
(England) Matt Sherratt

Player of the Match:
Warner Dearns (Japan)

Assistant referees:
Karl Dickson (England)
Damian Schneider (Argentina)
Television match official:
Glenn Newman (New Zealand)
Foul play review officer:
Ian Tempest (England)

Notes:

- Hayate Era, Sam Greene, Sena Kimura (all Japan), Christian Coleman, Keelan Giles and Reuben Morgan-Williams (all Wales) made their international debuts.

12 July 2025
19:05 NZST (UTC+12)

New Zealand	43–17	France
Try: Roigard 14' c Savea 23' c Taylor 29' m Vaa'i 36' c Jordan 54' c Ioane 62' c Con: B. Barrett (4/5) 15', 37', 55', 63'; J. Barrett (1/1) 24'; Pen: B. Barrett (1/1) 8'	Report	Try: Barré 47' c Brennan 77' c Con: Le Garrec (1/1) 48'; Hastoy (1/1) 78'; Pen: Le Garrec (1/1) 20'

Sky Stadium, Wellington
Attendance: 33,827
Referee: Christophe Ridley (England)

Team details

FB	15	Will Jordan
RW	14	Emoni Narawa
OC	13	Billy Proctor
IC	12	Jordie Barrett		(substituted off) 27'	(substituted on) 40'	(substituted off) 65'
LW	11	Rieko Ioane
FH	10	Beauden Barrett	(yellow card) 19'	(substituted off) 63'
SH	9	Cam Roigard		(substituted off) 63'
N8	8	Christian Lio-Willie		(substituted off) 55'
OF	7	Ardie Savea (c)
BF	6	Tupou Vaa'i
RL	5	Fabian Holland
LL	4	Patrick Tuipulotu		(substituted off) 61'
TP	3	Fletcher Newell		(substituted off) 48'
HK	2	Codie Taylor		(substituted off) 55'
LP	1	Ethan de Groot		(substituted off) 48'
Substitutions:
HK	16	Samisoni Taukei'aho		(substituted on) 55'
PR	17	Ollie Norris		(substituted on) 48'
PR	18	Pasilio Tosi		(substituted on) 48'
FL	19	Samipeni Finau		(substituted on) 61'
FL	20	Du'Plessis Kirifi		(substituted on) 55'
SH	21	Cortez Ratima		(substituted on) 63'
CE	22	Timoci Tavatavanawai		(substituted on) 27'	(substituted off) 40'	(substituted on) 65'
FH	23	Damian McKenzie		(substituted on) 63'
Coach:
(New Zealand) Scott Robertson

FB	15	Léo Barré
RW	14	Théo Attissogbé
OC	13	Nicolas Depoortère
IC	12	Pierre-Louis Barassi
LW	11	Émilien Gailleton
FH	10	Joris Segonds		(substituted off) 44'
SH	9	Nolann Le Garrec		(substituted off) 72'
N8	8	Esteban Abadie		(substituted off) 44'
OF	7	Jacobus van Tonder		(substituted off) 44'
BF	6	Pierre Bochaton
RL	5	Matthias Halagahu		(substituted off) 44'
LL	4	Joshua Brennan	(yellow card) 28'
TP	3	Georges-Henri Colombe		(substituted off) 40'
HK	2	Gaëtan Barlot (c)		(substituted off) 53'
LP	1	Baptiste Erdocio		(substituted off) 44'
Substitutions:
HK	16	Pierre Bourgarit		(substituted on) 53'
PR	17	Paul Mallez		(substituted on) 44'
PR	18	Régis Montagne		(substituted on) 40'
LK	19	Romain Taofifénua		(substituted on) 44'
LK	20	Cameron Woki		(substituted on) 44'
FL	21	Bastien Vergnes-Taillefer		(substituted on) 44'
SH	22	Thibault Daubagna		(substituted on) 72'
FH	23	Antoine Hastoy		(substituted on) 44'
Coach:
(France) Fabien Galthié

Player of the Match:
Ardie Savea (New Zealand)

Assistant referees:
Nic Berry (Australia)
Takehito Namekawa (Japan)
Television match official:
Brett Cronan (Australia)
Foul play review officer:
Damon Murphy (Australia)

Notes:

- Timoci Tavatavanawai (New Zealand), Pierre Bochaton, Joshua Brennan, Thibault Daubagna, Baptiste Erdocio, Matthias Halagahu and Bastien Vergnes-Taillefer (all France) made their international debuts.
- New Zealand reclaimed the Dave Gallaher Trophy.

12 July 2025
17:10 SAST (UTC+02)

South Africa	45–0	Italy
Try: Williams 8' m van der Merwe (2) 15' m, 31' c Moodie 37' c Marx 50' c Mapimpi 72' c Wessels 80' c Con: Libbok (5/7) 32', 38', 51', 73', 80+1'	Report

Nelson Mandela Bay Stadium, Gqeberha
Attendance: 44,282
Referee: Andrew Brace (Ireland)

Team details

FB	15	Willie le Roux		(substituted off) 55'
RW	14	Edwill van der Merwe
OC	13	Canan Moodie		(substituted off) 55'
IC	12	André Esterhuizen
LW	11	Makazole Mapimpi
FH	10	Manie Libbok
SH	9	Grant Williams		(substituted off) 55'
N8	8	Jasper Wiese	(red card) 21'
OF	7	Pieter-Steph du Toit
BF	6	Marco van Staden		(substituted off) 57'
RL	5	Ruan Nortjé
LL	4	Salmaan Moerat (c)		(substituted off) 55'
TP	3	Wilco Louw	(yellow card) 44'	(substituted off) 61'
HK	2	Malcolm Marx		(substituted off) 61'
LP	1	Thomas du Toit		(substituted off) 30'
Substitutions:
HK	16	Jan-Hendrik Wessels		(substituted on) 61'
PR	17	Ox Nché		(substituted on) 30'
PR	18	Asenathi Ntlabakanye		(substituted on) 61'
FL	19	Cobus Wiese		(substituted on) 55'
FL	20	Evan Roos		(substituted on) 57'
SH	21	Cobus Reinach		(substituted on) 55'
FH	22	Sacha Feinberg-Mngomezulu		(substituted on) 55'
CE	23	Ethan Hooker		(substituted on) 55'
Coach:
(South Africa) Rassie Erasmus

FB	15	Mirko Belloni
RW	14	Louis Lynagh
OC	13	Tommaso Menoncello
IC	12	Marco Zanon
LW	11	Jacopo Trulla		(substituted off) 17'
FH	10	Giacomo Da Re
SH	9	Alessandro Garbisi		(substituted off) 68'
N8	8	Ross Vintcent
OF	7	Manuel Zuliani		(substituted off) 70'
BF	6	Sebastian Negri		(substituted off) 59'
RL	5	Andrea Zambonin		(substituted off) 63'
LL	4	Niccolò Cannone (c)
TP	3	Simone Ferrari		(substituted off) 52'
HK	2	Tommaso Di Bartolomeo		(substituted off) 52'
LP	1	Danilo Fischetti	(yellow card) 47'	(substituted off) 63'
Substitutions:
HK	16	Pablo Dimcheff		(substituted on) 52'
PR	17	Mirco Spagnolo		(substituted on) 63'
PR	18	Muhamed Hasa		(substituted on) 52'
LK	19	Matteo Canali		(substituted on) 63'
FL	20	Alessandro Izekor		(substituted on) 59'
FL	21	David Odiase	(yellow card) 74'	(substituted on) 70'
SH	22	Stephen Varney		(substituted on) 68'
CE	23	Giulio Bertaccini		(substituted on) 17'
Coach:
(Argentina) Gonzalo Quesada

Player of the Match:
Edwill van der Merwe (South Africa)

Assistant referees:
Matthew Carley (England)
Hollie Davidson (Scotland)
Television match official:
Tual Trainini (France)
Foul play review officer:
Andrew Jackson (England)

Notes:

- Willie le Roux became the eighth South African to earn 100 test caps.
- Asenathi Ntlabakanye, Ethan Hooker and Cobus Wiese (all South Africa) made their international debuts.

12 July 2025
19:00 WEST (UTC+01)

Portugal	7–106	Ireland
Try: Martins 53' c Con: Aubry (1/1) 54'	Report	Try: McCloskey 1' c Gavin (2) 9' c, 40+2' c T. O'Brien (2) 11' c, 24' c Bolton (2) 13' c, 36' m Clarkson 32' c Casey 42' c Prendergast (2) 51' m, 60' c Nash 56' m Frawley 58' c Kendellen 73' c Murphy 79' c Penalty try 80+1'; Con: Crowley (12/15) 2', 10', 12', 14', 25', 33', 40+2', 43', 59', 61', 74', 80'

Estádio Nacional, Lisbon
Attendance: 8,000
Referee: Adam Leal (England)

Team details

FB	15	Nuno Sousa Guedes
RW	14	Simão Bento
OC	13	Vincent Pinto
IC	12	Tomás Appleton (c)	(substituted off) 22'
LW	11	Manuel Cardoso Pinto
FH	10	Hugo Aubry
SH	9	Hugo Camacho	(substituted off) 52'
N8	8	Diego Pinheiro	(substituted off) 64'
OF	7	Nicolas Martins
BF	6	David Wallis
RL	5	Pedro Ferreira	(substituted off) 61'
LL	4	António Rebelo de Andrade	(substituted off) 50'
TP	3	Diogo Hasse Ferreira	(substituted off) 40'
HK	2	Luka Begic	(substituted off) 40'
LP	1	David Costa	(substituted off) 57'
Substitutions:
PR	16	Abel da Cunha	(substituted on) 40'
HK	17	Pedro Santiago Lopes	(substituted on) 40'
PR	18	Martim Souto	(substituted on) 57'
LK	19	Guilherme Costa	(substituted on) 50'
FL	20	Francisco Almeida		(substituted on) 35'
FL	21	Vasco Baptista	(substituted on) 64'
SH	22	António Campos	(substituted on) 52'
CE	23	Gabriel Aviragnet	(substituted on) 22'	(substituted off) 35'
Coach:
(New Zealand) Simon Mannix

FB	15	Jimmy O'Brien
RW	14	Tommy O'Brien	(substituted off) 52'
OC	13	Hugh Gavin
IC	12	Stuart McCloskey	(substituted off) 52'
LW	11	Shayne Bolton
FH	10	Jack Crowley
SH	9	Craig Casey (c)	(substituted off) 62'
N8	8	Cian Prendergast
OF	7	Alex Kendellen
BF	6	Ryan Baird	(substituted off) 52'
RL	5	Darragh Murray	(substituted off) 61'
LL	4	Thomas Ahern
TP	3	Tom Clarkson	(substituted off) 52'
HK	2	Gus McCarthy	(substituted off) 52'
LP	1	Jack Boyle	(substituted off) 52'
Substitutions:
HK	16	Tom Stewart	(substituted on) 52'
PR	17	Michael Milne	(substituted on) 52'
PR	18	Tom O'Toole	(substituted on) 52'
LK	19	Cormac Izuchukwu	(substituted on) 61'
FL	20	Max Deegan	(substituted on) 52'
SH	21	Ben Murphy	(substituted on) 62'
FH	22	Ciarán Frawley	(substituted on) 52'
WG	23	Calvin Nash	(substituted on) 52'
Coach:
(Ireland) Paul O'Connell

Assistant referees:
Anthony Woodthorpe (England)
Ben Whitehouse (Wales)
Television match official:
Matteo Liperini (Italy)

Notes:

- Francisco Almeida, Guilherme Costa (both Portugal), Shayne Bolton, Hugh Gavin and Alex Kendellen (all Ireland) made their international debuts.

12 July 2025
15:00 UYT (UTC-3)

Uruguay	70–8	Romania
Try: Péculo 6' c Civetta 10' c González (2) 15' m, 34' m Basso (2) 28' m, 62' c Diana 39' c Pérez 41' m S. Álvarez 47' c Ardao 65' c Piussi 80' m Con: Etcheverry (4/8) 7', 11', 40', 48'; S. Álvarez (2/3) 63', 66'; Pen: Etcheverry (1/1) 32'	Report	Try: Bucur 12' m Pen: Mitrea (1/1) 25'

Estadio Charrúa, Montevideo
Referee: Craig Evans (Wales)

Team details

FB	15	Juan González	(substituted off) 66'
RW	14	Bautista Basso
OC	13	Felipe Arcos Pérez	(substituted off) 59'
IC	12	Andrés Vilaseca	(substituted off) 69'
LW	11	Ignacio Álvarez
FH	10	Felipe Etcheverry
SH	9	Santiago Álvarez
N8	8	Manuel Diana
OF	7	Lucas Bianchi
BF	6	Santiago Civetta	(substituted off) 46'
RL	5	Manuel Leindekar (c)	(substituted off) 52'
LL	4	Felipe Aliaga
TP	3	Ignacio Péculo	(substituted off) 51'
HK	2	Germán Kessler	(substituted off) 46'
LP	1	Mateo Sanguinetti	(substituted off) 49'
Substitutions:
HK	16	Facundo Gattas	(substituted on) 46'
PR	17	Francisco Suárez	(substituted on) 49'
PR	18	Reinaldo Piussi	(substituted on) 51'
LK	19	Ignacio Dotti	(substituted on) 52'
FL	20	Manuel Ardao	(substituted on) 46'
SH	21	Juan Manuel Tafernaberry	(substituted on) 69'
FH	22	Ícaro Amarillo	(substituted on) 66'
CE	23	Joaquín Suárez	(substituted on) 59'
Coach:
(Argentina) Rodolfo Ambrosio

FB	15	Alexandru Harasim		(substituted off) 40'
RW	14	Alexandru Bucur		(substituted off) 13'
OC	13	Antonio Mitrea
IC	12	Fonovai Tangimana
LW	11	Taliaʻuli Sikuea
FH	10	Ștefan Cojocariu
SH	9	Vladut Bocanet		(substituted off) 72'
N8	8	Damian Strătilă		(substituted off) 49'
OF	7	Nicolaas Immelman			(substituted off) 67'
BF	6	Cristi Boboc (c)
RL	5	Andrei Mahu		(substituted off) 49'
LL	4	Adrian Moțoc
TP	3	Thomas Crețu		(substituted off) 49'
HK	2	Tudor Butnariu		(substituted off) 62'
LP	1	Iulian Harțig	(yellow card) 72'	(substituted off) 49'	(substituted on) 67'
Substitutions:
HK	16	Lukas Mitu		(substituted on) 62'
PR	17	Alexandru Savin	(yellow card) 64'	(substituted on) 49'
PR	18	Gheorghe Gajion		(substituted on) 49'
LK	19	Yanis Horvat		(substituted on) 49'
FL	20	Florian Roșu		(substituted on) 49'
SH	21	Toma Mîrzac		(substituted on) 72'
FH	22	Tudor Boldor		(substituted on) 40'
WG	23	Rafael Florea-Jilaveanu		(substituted on) 13'
Coach:
(France) David Gérard

Assistant referees:
Federico Vedovelli (Italy)
Cauã Ricardo (Brazil)
Television match official:
Marcelo Pilaro (Argentina)

Notes:

- Francisco Suárez (Uruguay), Ștefan Cojocariu, Rafael Florea-Jilaveanu Alexandru Harasim, Lukas Mitu and Toma Mîrzac (all Romania) made their international test debuts.

12 July 2025
16:40 ART (UTC-03)

Argentina	17–22	England
Try: Cinti 26' c Mendy 39' c Con: Carreras (2/2) 27', 40'; Pen: Carreras (1/1) 8'	Report	Try: Atkinson 3' c Steward 33' c van Poortvliet 79' m Con: Ford (2/3) 4', 34'; Pen: Ford (1/1) 53'

Estadio San Juan del Bicentenario, San Juan
Attendance: 20,000
Referee: Luc Ramos (France)

Team details

FB	15	Benjamín Elizalde
RW	14	Matías Moroni
OC	13	Lucio Cinti
IC	12	Justo Piccardo
LW	11	Ignacio Mendy
FH	10	Santiago Carreras		(substituted off) 66'
SH	9	Simón Benítez Cruz		(substituted off) 71'
N8	8	Pablo Matera	(yellow card) 58'	(substituted off) 71'
OF	7	Juan Martín González
BF	6	Santiago Grondona		(substituted off) 60'
RL	5	Pedro Rubiolo		(substituted off) 77'
LL	4	Guido Petti
TP	3	Francisco Gómez Kodela		(substituted off) 42'
HK	2	Julián Montoya (c)		(substituted off) 77'
LP	1	Thomas Gallo		(substituted off) 46'
Substitutions:
HK	16	Bautista Bernasconi		(substituted on) 77'
PR	17	Mayco Vivas		(substituted on) 46'
PR	18	Pedro Delgado		(substituted on) 42'
LK	19	Lucas Paulos		(substituted on) 77'
N8	20	Facundo Isa		(substituted on) 60'
FL	21	Benjamín Grondona		(substituted on) 71'
SH	22	Agustín Moyano		(substituted on) 71'
FH	23	Nicolas Roger		(substituted on) 66'
Coach:
(Argentina) Felipe Contepomi

FB	15	Freddie Steward
RW	14	Tom Roebuck
OC	13	Luke Northmore			(substituted off) 71'
IC	12	Seb Atkinson
LW	11	Will Muir		(substituted off) 60'
FH	10	George Ford (c)
SH	9	Ben Spencer		(substituted off) 60'
N8	8	Tom Willis		(substituted off) 65'
OF	7	Sam Underhill		(substituted off) 57'	(substituted on) 71'
BF	6	Ben Curry	(yellow card) 20'
RL	5	Alex Coles		(substituted off) 77'
LL	4	Charlie Ewels
TP	3	Joe Heyes		(substituted off) 57'
HK	2	Theo Dan		(substituted off) 48'
LP	1	Fin Baxter		(substituted off) 57'
Substitutions:
HK	16	Curtis Langdon		(substituted on) 48'
PR	17	Bevan Rodd		(substituted on) 57'
PR	18	Asher Opoku-Fordjour		(substituted on) 57'
FL	19	Chandler Cunningham-South		(substituted on) 77'
FL	20	Guy Pepper		(substituted on) 57'
N8	21	Alex Dombrandt		(substituted on) 65'
SH	22	Jack van Poortvliet		(substituted on) 60'
WG	23	Cadan Murley		(substituted on) 60'
Coach:
(England) Steve Borthwick

Assistant referees:
Angus Gardner (Australia)
Gianluca Gnecchi (Italy)
Television match official:
Mike Adamson (Scotland)
Foul play review officer:
Olly Hodges (Ireland)

Notes:

- Benjamín Grondona, Agustín Moyano (both Argentina) and Luke Northmore (England) made their international debuts.
- Pablo Matera earned his 111th test cap to surpass Agustín Creevy's record as Argentina's most capped player.

12 July 2025
17:00 MDT (UTC-6)

Canada	18–25	Belgium
Try: Morra 22' m Quattrin 32' m Parry 80+2' m Pen: Coats (1/1) 7'	Report	Try: Remue 14' c Soenen (2) 25' m, 52' c Con: Remue (1/2) 15'; De Francq (1/1) 53'; Pen: Remue (2/2) 60', 75'

Clarke Stadium, Edmonton
Referee: Gonzalo De Achaval (Argentina)

12 July 2025
21:28 EDT (UTC-04) (Note: The match was originally scheduled to kick off at 19:30 EDT, but was delayed due to weather and was rescheduled for 21:28.)

United States	20–31	Spain
Try: Bonasso (2) 35' c, 38' c Con: MacGinty (2/2) 36', 39'; Pen: MacGinty (2/2) 41', 51'	Report	Try: Cian 2' c Bay 17' c López-Bontempo 22' c Nieto 79' c Con: López-Bontempo (4/4) 3', 18', 23', 80'; Pen: López-Bontempo (1/2) 71'

American Legion Memorial Stadium, Charlotte
Attendance: 6,129
Referee: Morné Ferreira (South Africa)

Team details

FB	15	Mitch Wilson	(substituted off) 61'
RW	14	Toby Fricker
OC	13	Dominic Besag
IC	12	Tom Pittman
LW	11	Nate Augspurger	(substituted off) 71'
FH	10	AJ MacGinty
SH	9	Ruben de Haas	(substituted off) 72'
N8	8	Jamason Faʻanana-Schultz
OF	7	Cory Daniel
BF	6	Benjamín Bonasso (c)	(substituted off) 72'
RL	5	Vili Helu	(substituted off) 61'
LL	4	Marno Redelinghuys
TP	3	Tonga Kofe	(substituted off) 54'
HK	2	Shilo Klein	(substituted off) 66'
LP	1	Jack Iscaro	(substituted off) 54'
Substitutions:
HK	16	Kaleb Geiger	(substituted on) 66'
PR	17	Payton Talea	(substituted on) 54'
PR	18	Pono Davis	(substituted on) 54'
LK	19	Tevita Naqali	(substituted on) 61'
FL	20	Christian Poidevin	(substituted on) 72'
SH	21	Juan-Philip Smith	(substituted on) 72'
FH	22	Erich Storti	(substituted on) 71'
WG	23	Lauina Futi	(substituted on) 61'
Coach:
(United States) Scott Lawrence

FB	15	J. W. Bell
RW	14	Martiniano Cian
OC	13	Álvar Gimeno
IC	12	Gonzalo López-Bontempo
LW	11	Gauthier Minguillon	(substituted off) 71'
FH	10	Gonzalo Vinuesa	(substituted off) 65'
SH	9	Estanislao Bay	(substituted off) 70'
N8	8	Raphaël Nieto
OF	7	Matheo Triki	(substituted off) 60'
BF	6	Vicente Boronat
RL	5	Asier Usárraga	(substituted off) 70'
LL	4	Matthew Foulds
TP	3	Jon Zabala	(substituted off) 65'
HK	2	Álvaro García (c)	(substituted off) 78'
LP	1	Bernardo Vázquez	(substituted off) 50'
Substitutions:
HK	16	Vicente Del Hoyo	(substituted on) 78'
PR	17	Thierry Futeu	(substituted on) 50'
PR	18	Joaquín Domínguez	(substituted on) 65'
LK	19	Marc Sánchez	(substituted on) 70'
FL	20	Ekain Imaz	(substituted on) 60'
SH	21	Kerman Aurrekoetxea	(substituted on) 70'
CE	22	Iñaki Mateu	(substituted on) 65'
WG	23	Pau Aira	(substituted on) 71'
Coach:
(Argentina) Pablo Bouza

Assistant referees:
Sam Grove-White (Scotland)
Robin Kaluzniak (Canada)
Television match official:
Cam Russell (Canada)

Notes:

- Tom Pittman and Christian Poidevin (both USA) made their international debuts.

=== 18/19 July ===
18 July 2025
19:35 NZST (UTC+12)

Samoa	12–41	Scotland
Try: Nee-Nee 50' m Paia’aua 64' c Con: Umaga (1/2) 65'	Report	Try: Ashman 8' m Hutchinson 13' c Reed 31' m Steyn 36' m Gilchrist 45' c Rowe 55' m Turner 77' c Con: Burke (1/4) 14'; Horne (2/3) 46', 78'

Eden Park, Auckland (New Zealand)
Attendance: 15,000
Referee: Jordan Way (Australia)

Team details

FB	15	Latrell Smiler-Ah Kiong	(substituted off) 53'
RW	14	Tuna Tuitama
OC	13	Duncan Paia’aua
IC	12	Henry Taefu
LW	11	Tomasi Alosio
FH	10	Jacob Umaga
SH	9	Melani Matavao	(substituted off) 69'
N8	8	Taleni Seu	(substituted off) 46'
OF	7	Jonah Mau'u	(substituted off) 46'
BF	6	Theo McFarland (c)
RL	5	Sam Slade	(substituted off) 65'
LL	4	Ben Nee-Nee
TP	3	Michael Alaalatoa	(substituted off) 61'
HK	2	Pita Anae Ah-Sue	(substituted off) 52'
LP	1	Aki Seiuli	(substituted off) 73'
Substitutions:
HK	16	Luteru Tolai	(substituted on) 52'
PR	17	Kaynan Siteine-Tua	(substituted on) 73'
PR	18	Marco Fepulea'i	(substituted on) 61'
LK	19	Michael Curry	(substituted on) 65'
FL	20	Niko Jones	(substituted on) 46'
FL	21	Iakopo Mapu	(substituted on) 46'
SH	22	Connor Tupai	(substituted on) 69'
FH	23	Rodney Iona	(substituted on) 53'
Coach:
(Samoa) Tusi Pisi

FB	15	Kyle Rowe
RW	14	Kyle Steyn	(substituted off) 40'
OC	13	Rory Hutchinson
IC	12	Stafford McDowall
LW	11	Arron Reed
FH	10	Fergus Burke	(substituted off) 59'
SH	9	Jamie Dobie	(substituted off) 74'
N8	8	Matt Fagerson
OF	7	Rory Darge (c)	(substituted off) 56'
BF	6	Andy Onyeama-Christie
RL	5	Grant Gilchrist
LL	4	Gregor Brown	(substituted off) 56'
TP	3	Elliot Millar-Mills	(substituted off) 56'
HK	2	Ewan Ashman	(substituted off) 40'
LP	1	Rory Sutherland	(substituted off) 40'
Substitutions:
HK	16	George Turner	(substituted on) 40'
PR	17	Nathan McBeth	(substituted on) 40'
PR	18	Fin Richardson	(substituted on) 56'
LK	19	Cameron Henderson	(substituted on) 56'
LK	20	Marshall Sykes	(substituted on) 74'
FL	21	Ben Muncaster	(substituted on) 56'
SH	22	George Horne	(substituted on) 40'
FH	23	Adam Hastings	(substituted on) 59'
Coach:
(Scotland) Gregor Townsend

Assistant referees:
Nic Berry (Australia)
Tevita Rokovereni (Fiji)
Television match official:
Marius Jonker (South Africa)

Notes:

- Pita Anae Ah-Sue, Niko Jones, Kaynan Siteine-Tua, Latrell Smiler-Ah Kiong, Connor Tupai and Jacob Umaga (all Samoa) and Fin Richardson (Scotland) made their international debuts.

18 July 2025
15:00 ART (UTC-03)

Argentina XV	52–14	Romania
Try: Revol 6' c Cipriani (2) 11' m, 56' c Cardozo 24' c Wade 36' c Gallo 40' c Quetglas 63' m Toth 72' c Con: Farisé (4/5) 7', 24', 36', 40'; Baronio (2/3) 57', 73'	Report	Try: Horvat 17' c Boboc 66' c Con: Mitrea (2/2) 18', 66'

Club Atlético San Isidro, Buenos Aires
Referee: Francisco Gonzalez (Uruguay)

18 July 2025
19:00 MDT (UTC-6)

Canada	23–24	Spain
Try: Oworu (2) 44' c, 48' c Con: Nelson (2/2) 45', 49'; Pen: Nelson (3/4) 16', 21', 62'	Report	Try: Aira 32' m Penalty try 56'; Pen: López-Bontempo (4/4) 5', 40', 64', 80+1'

Clarke Stadium, Edmonton
Referee: Angus Mabey (New Zealand)

Team details

FB	15	Peter Nelson
RW	14	Isaac Olson		(substituted off) 53'	(substituted on) 66'
OC	13	Noah Flesch
IC	12	Spencer Jones
LW	11	Josiah Morra
FH	10	Cooper Coats
SH	9	Jason Higgins
N8	8	Matthew Oworu
OF	7	Lucas Rumball (c)
BF	6	Sion Parry		(substituted off) 70'
RL	5	Evan Olmstead
LL	4	Piers von Dadelszen
TP	3	Cole Keith		(substituted off) 64'
HK	2	Andrew Quattrin		(substituted off) 78'
LP	1	Cali Martinez	(yellow card) 51'
Substitutions:
HK	16	Dewald Kotze		(substituted on) 78'
PR	17	Emerson Prior	(yellow card) 56'	(substituted on) 53'	(substituted off) 66'
PR	18	Kyle Steeves		(substituted on) 64'
LK	19	Izzak Kelly
FL	20	Matt Heaton		(substituted on) 70'
SH	21	Stephen Webb
CE	22	Kyle Tremblay
FH	23	Brenden Black
Coach:
(Australia) Steve Meehan

FB	15	J. W. Bell
RW	14	Martiniano Cian		(substituted off) 56'
OC	13	Iñaki Mateu		(substituted off) 51'
IC	12	Gonzalo López-Bontempo
LW	11	Pau Aira			(substituted off) 73'
FH	10	Gonzalo Vinuesa
SH	9	Kerman Aurrekoetxea
N8	8	Raphaël Nieto		(substituted off) 51'
OF	7	Matheo Triki		(substituted off) 70'
BF	6	Ignacio Piñeiro
RL	5	Asier Usárraga		(substituted off) 53'
LL	4	Matthew Foulds
TP	3	Joaquín Domínguez		(substituted off) 72'	(substituted on) 73'
HK	2	Álvaro García (c)		(substituted off) 70'
LP	1	Thierry Futeu		(substituted off) 56'
Substitutions:
HK	16	Vicente Del Hoyo		(substituted on) 70'
PR	17	Bernardo Vázquez		(substituted on) 56'
PR	18	Lucas Santamaría	(yellow card) 73'	(substituted on) 72'
LK	19	Imanol Urraza		(substituted on) 53'
FL	20	Ekain Imaz		(substituted on) 70'
SH	21	Estanislao Bay		(substituted on) 51'
CE	22	Álvar Gimeno		(substituted on) 51'
WG	23	Gauthier Minguillon		(substituted on) 56'
Coach:
(Argentina) Pablo Bouza

Player of the Match:
Matthew Oworu (Canada)

Assistant referees:
Gonzalo de Achaval (Argentina)
Luke Rogan (United States)
Television match official:
Mike Kelly (United States)

Notes:

- Emerson Prior (Canada) made his international debut.

19 July 2025
19:05 NZST (UTC+12)

New Zealand	29–19	France
Try: Jordan 22' c Lienert-Brown 40+3' c Kirifi 59' m McAlister 76' c Con: McKenzie (3/4) 22', 40+4', 77'; Pen: McKenzie (1/1) 31'	Report	Try: Le Garrec 8' c Con: Le Garrec (1/1) 9'; Pen: Le Garrec (3/3) 20', 34', 37'; Drop: Hastoy (1/1) 24'

Waikato Stadium, Hamilton
Attendance: 24,162
Referee: Angus Gardner (Australia)

Team details

FB	15	Ruben Love
RW	14	Will Jordan
OC	13	Anton Lienert-Brown	(substituted off) 70'
IC	12	Quinn Tupaea	(substituted off) 55'
LW	11	Sevu Reece
FH	10	Damian McKenzie
SH	9	Cortez Ratima	(substituted off) 66'
N8	8	Ardie Savea (c)
OF	7	Du'Plessis Kirifi
BF	6	Samipeni Finau	(substituted off) 66'
RL	5	Fabian Holland
LL	4	Patrick Tuipulotu
TP	3	Tyrel Lomax	(substituted off) 50'
HK	2	Samisoni Taukei'aho	(substituted off) 50'
LP	1	Ethan de Groot	(substituted off) 45'
Substitutions:
HK	16	Brodie McAlister	(substituted on) 50'
PR	17	George Bower	(substituted on) 45'
PR	18	Fletcher Newell	(substituted on) 50'
FL	19	Dalton Papali'i	(substituted on) 66'
N8	20	Christian Lio-Willie
SH	21	Noah Hotham	(substituted on) 66'
CE	22	Timoci Tavatavanawai	(substituted on) 70'
CE	23	Jordie Barrett	(substituted on) 55'
Coach:
(New Zealand) Scott Robertson

FB	15	Léo Barré	(substituted off) 60'
RW	14	Théo Attissogbé
OC	13	Nicolas Depoortère
IC	12	Gaël Fickou (c)
LW	11	Gabin Villière
FH	10	Antoine Hastoy
SH	9	Nolann Le Garrec	(substituted off) 72'
N8	8	Mickaël Guillard
OF	7	Joshua Brennan
BF	6	Alexandre Fischer	(substituted off) 40'
RL	5	Matthias Halagahu	(substituted off) 45'
LL	4	Hugo Auradou	(substituted off) 60'
TP	3	Rabah Slimani	(substituted off) 45'
HK	2	Pierre Bourgarit	(substituted off) 45'
LP	1	Baptiste Erdocio	(substituted off) 45'
Substitutions:
HK	16	Gaëtan Barlot	(substituted on) 45'
PR	17	Paul Mallez	(substituted on) 45'
PR	18	Demba Bamba	(substituted on) 45'
LK	19	Romain Taofifénua	(substituted on) 45'
FL	20	Killian Tixeront	(substituted on) 60'
FL	21	Pierre Bochaton	(substituted on) 40'
SH	22	Thibault Daubagna	(substituted on) 72'
CE	23	Émilien Gailleton	(substituted on) 60'
Coach:
(France) Fabien Galthié

Assistant referees:
Damian Schneider (Argentina)
Takehito Namekawa (Japan)
Television match official:
Brett Cronan (Australia)
Foul play review officer:
Damon Murphy (Australia)

Notes:

- Brodie McAlister (New Zealand) made his international debut.

19 July 2025
20:00 AEST (UTC+10)

Australia	19–27	British & Irish Lions
Try: Jorgensen 28' m Tizzano 67' c McDermott 78' c Con: Donaldson (2/2) 68', 78'	Report	Try: Tuipulotu 8' c Curry 35' c Sheehan 41' c Con: Russell (3/3) 9', 36', 42'; Pen: Russell (1/1) 1'; Marcus Smith (1/1) 73'

Suncorp Stadium, Brisbane
Attendance: 52,229
Referee: Ben O'Keeffe (New Zealand)

Team details

FB	15	Tom Wright
RW	14	Max Jorgensen
OC	13	Joseph Sua'ali'i
IC	12	Len Ikitau	(substituted off) 68'
LW	11	Harry Potter
FH	10	Tom Lynagh	(substituted off) 60'
SH	9	Jake Gordon	(substituted off) 58'
N8	8	Harry Wilson (c)
OF	7	Fraser McReight
BF	6	Nick Champion de Crespigny	(substituted off) 66'
RL	5	Jeremy Williams	(substituted off) 58'
LL	4	Nick Frost
TP	3	Allan Alaalatoa	(substituted off) 57'
HK	2	Matt Faessler	(substituted off) 49'
LP	1	James Slipper	(substituted off) 49'
Substitutions:
HK	16	Billy Pollard	(substituted on) 49'
PR	17	Angus Bell	(substituted on) 49'
PR	18	Tom Robertson	(substituted on) 49'
LK	19	Tom Hooper	(substituted on) 58'
FL	20	Carlo Tizzano	(substituted on) 66'
SH	21	Tate McDermott	(substituted on) 58'
FH	22	Ben Donaldson	(substituted on) 60'
WG	23	Andrew Kellaway	(substituted on) 68'
Coach:
Joe Schmidt

FB	15	Hugo Keenan
RW	14	Tommy Freeman
OC	13	Huw Jones
IC	12	Sione Tuipulotu	(substituted off) 57'
LW	11	James Lowe
FH	10	Finn Russell	(substituted off) 66'
SH	9	Jamison Gibson-Park	(substituted off) 74'
N8	8	Jack Conan
OF	7	Tom Curry	(substituted off) 57'
BF	6	Tadhg Beirne
RL	5	Joe McCarthy	(substituted off) 43'
LL	4	Maro Itoje (c)
TP	3	Tadhg Furlong	(substituted off) 57'
HK	2	Dan Sheehan	(substituted off) 60'
LP	1	Ellis Genge	(substituted off) 48'
Substitutions:
HK	16	Rónan Kelleher	(substituted on) 60'
PR	17	Andrew Porter	(substituted on) 48'
PR	18	Will Stuart	(substituted on) 57'
LK	19	Ollie Chessum	(substituted on) 43'
FL	20	Ben Earl	(substituted on) 57'
SH	21	Alex Mitchell	(substituted on) 74'
FH	22	Marcus Smith	(substituted on) 66'
CE	23	Bundee Aki	(substituted on) 57'
Coach:
Andy Farrell

Player of the Match:
Tadhg Beirne (British and Irish Lions)

Assistant referees:
Nika Amashukeli (Georgia)
Andrea Piardi (Italy)
Television match official:
Richard Kelly (New Zealand)
Foul play review officer:
Eric Gauzins (France)

Notes:

- Nick Champion de Crespigny (Australia) made his international debut.
- Maro Itoje (British & Irish Lions) earned his 100th test cap (93 England, 7 British & Irish Lions).

19 July 2025
17:10 SAST (UTC+02)

South Africa	55–10	Georgia
Try: Venter 9' m M. van der Merwe (2) 14' m, 32' c Moodie 17' m E. van der Merwe (2) 47' m, 73' c Willemse 56' c Arendse 79' c Pollard 80+1' c Con: Feinberg-Mngomezulu (1/5) 33'; Pollard (4/4) 57', 74', 79', 80+2'	Report	Try: Karkadze 3' c Con: Matkava (1/1) 4'; Pen: Matkava (1/1) 29'

Mbombela Stadium, Nelspruit
Attendance: 36,842
Referee: Matthew Carley (England)

Team details

FB	15	Aphelele Fassi	(substituted off) 55'
RW	14	Edwill van der Merwe
OC	13	Canan Moodie
IC	12	Damian de Allende
LW	11	Kurt-Lee Arendse
FH	10	Sacha Feinberg-Mngomezulu	(substituted off) 55'
SH	9	Grant Williams	(substituted off) 60'
N8	8	Cobus Wiese			(substituted off) 45'
OF	7	Pieter-Steph du Toit
BF	6	Siya Kolisi (c)	(substituted off) 1'	(substituted on) 14'
RL	5	Ruan Nortjé
LL	4	Eben Etzebeth	(substituted off) 45'
TP	3	Neethling Fouché	(substituted off) 45'
HK	2	Marnus van der Merwe	(substituted off) 45'
LP	1	Boan Venter	(substituted off) 45'
Substitutions:
HK	16	Bongi Mbonambi	(substituted on) 45'
PR	17	Thomas du Toit	(substituted on) 45'
PR	18	Vincent Koch	(substituted on) 45'
LK	19	RG Snyman	(substituted on) 45'
FL	20	Kwagga Smith	(substituted on) 1'	(substituted off) 14'	(substituted on) 45'
SH	21	Faf de Klerk	(substituted on) 60'
FH	22	Handré Pollard	(substituted on) 55'
FB	23	Damian Willemse	(substituted on) 55'
Coach:
(South Africa) Rassie Erasmus

FB	15	Davit Niniashvili	(substituted off) 61'
RW	14	Aka Tabutsadze	(substituted off) 75'
OC	13	Demur Tapladze
IC	12	Giorgi Kveseladze
LW	11	Alexander Todua
FH	10	Luka Matkava
SH	9	Vasil Lobzhanidze
N8	8	Ilia Spanderashvili	(substituted off) 52'
OF	7	Beka Saghinadze (c)	(substituted off) 64'
BF	6	Luka Ivanishvili
RL	5	Lado Chachanidze	(substituted off) 56'
LL	4	Mikheil Babunashvili
TP	3	Irakli Aptsiauri	(substituted off) 40'
HK	2	Vano Karkadze	(substituted off) 56'
LP	1	Giorgi Akhaladze	(substituted off) 56'
Substitutions:
HK	16	Irakli Kvatadze	(substituted on) 56'
PR	17	Giorgi Tetrashvili	(substituted on) 56'
PR	18	Beka Gigashvili	(substituted on) 40'
LK	19	Demur Epremidze	(substituted on) 56'
FL	20	Sandro Mamamtavrishvili	(substituted on) 52'
FL	21	Tornike Jalaghonia	(substituted on) 64'
FH	22	Tedo Abzhandadze	(substituted on) 61'
CE	23	Tornike Kakhoidze	(substituted on) 75'
Coach:
(England) Richard Cockerill

Assistant referees:
Hollie Davidson (Scotland)
Adam Leal (England)
Television match official:
Andrew Jackson (England)
Foul play review officer:
Tual Trainini (France)

Notes:

- Neethling Fouché, Marnus van der Merwe, Boan Venter (all South Africa) and Sandro Mamamtavrishvili (Georgia) made their international debuts.

19 July 2025
16:40 ART (UTC-03)

Argentina	52–17	Uruguay
Try: Penalty try 3'; Moroni 40+1' m Montoya 45' c Cordero 49' m Piccardo 58' c Isgró 63' c Moyano 69' c Roger 76' c Con: Roger (5/7) 45', 59', 64', 69', 77'	Report	Try: Aliaga 16' c I. Álvarez 54' c Con: S. Álvarez (2/2) 17', 55'; Pen: S. Álvarez (1/1) 42'

Estadio Padre Ernesto Martearena, Salta
Attendance: 22,000
Referee: Gianluca Gnecchi (Italy)

Team details

FB	15	Benjamín Elizalde
RW	14	Rodrigo Isgró
OC	13	Matías Moroni		(substituted off) 52'
IC	12	Justo Piccardo
LW	11	Santiago Pernas		(substituted off) 40'
FH	10	Nicolas Roger
SH	9	Simón Benítez Cruz		(substituted off) 62'
N8	8	Joaquin Moro
OF	7	Benjamín Grondona		(substituted off) 56'
BF	6	Pablo Matera
RL	5	Pedro Rubiolo	(red card) 51'
LL	4	Guido Petti
TP	3	Francisco Gómez Kodela		(substituted off) 46'
HK	2	Julián Montoya (c)		(substituted off) 69'
LP	1	Mayco Vivas		(substituted off) 51'
Substitutions:
HK	16	Bautista Bernasconi		(substituted on) 69'
PR	17	Nahuel Tetaz Chaparro		(substituted on) 51'
PR	18	Francisco Coria Marchetti		(substituted on) 46'
LK	19	Lucas Paulos		(substituted on) 75'
FL	20	Nicolás D’Amorim		(substituted on) 56'
SH	21	Agustín Moyano		(substituted on) 62'
CE	22	Faustino Sanchez Valarolo		(substituted on) 52'
WG	23	Santiago Cordero		(substituted on) 40'
Coach:
(Argentina) Felipe Contepomi

FB	15	Juan González
RW	14	Bautista Basso
OC	13	Felipe Arcos Pérez		(substituted off) 60'
IC	12	Andrés Vilaseca		(substituted off) 65'
LW	11	Ignacio Álvarez
FH	10	Felipe Etcheverry
SH	9	Santiago Álvarez
N8	8	Manuel Diana		(substituted off) 51'
OF	7	Lucas Bianchi
BF	6	Manuel Ardao		(substituted off) 60'
RL	5	Manuel Leindekar (c)		(substituted off) 68'
LL	4	Felipe Aliaga
TP	3	Diego Arbelo		(substituted off) 46'
HK	2	Germán Kessler		(substituted off) 46'
LP	1	Mateo Sanguinetti	(yellow card) 3'	(substituted off) 46'
Substitutions:
HK	16	Facundo Gattas		(substituted on) 46'
PR	17	Francisco Suárez		(substituted on) 46'
PR	18	Ignacio Péculo		(substituted on) 46'
LK	19	Ignacio Dotti		(substituted on) 68'
FL	20	Carlos Deus		(substituted on) 51'
FL	21	Santiago Civetta		(substituted on) 60'
FH	22	Juan Manuel Tafernaberry		(substituted on) 65'
FH	23	Ícaro Amarillo		(substituted on) 60'
Coach:
(Argentina) Rodolfo Ambrosio

Assistant referees:
Craig Evans (Wales)
Federico Vedovelli (Italy)
Television match official:
Mike Adamson (Scotland)

Notes:

- Nicolás D’Amorim, Santiago Pernas and Faustino Sanchez Valarolo (all Argentina) made their international debuts.

19 July 2025
19:05 EDT (UTC-04) (Note: The match was originally scheduled to kick off at 18:00 EDT, but was delayed due to weather and was rescheduled for 19:05. The game was also paused during the 29th minute due to lightning in the area.)

United States	5–40	England
Try: Klein 80+3' m	Report	Try: Langdon 12' c Northmore 19' c Murley 40+2' m van Poortvliet 41' c Randall 62' c Oghre 74' c Con: Ford (4/5) 13', 19', 42', 63'; Atkinson (1/1) 75'

Audi Field, Washington, D.C.
Attendance: 19,079
Referee: Sam Grove-White (Scotland)

Team details

FB	15	Erich Storti
RW	14	Rufus McLean		(substituted off) 65'
OC	13	Dominic Besag
IC	12	Tom Pittman
LW	11	Toby Fricker
FH	10	Christopher Hilsenbeck	(yellow card) 10'
SH	9	Ruben de Haas		(substituted off) 52'
N8	8	Jamason Faʻanana-Schultz		(substituted off) 64'
OF	7	Cory Daniel		(substituted off) 52'
BF	6	Benjamín Bonasso (c)
RL	5	Tevita Naqali
LL	4	Marno Redelinghuys		(substituted off) 19'
TP	3	Pono Davis		(substituted off) 42'
HK	2	Kaleb Geiger		(substituted off) 64'
LP	1	Ezekiel Lindenmuth		(substituted off) 47'
Substitutions:
HK	16	Shilo Klein		(substituted on) 64'
PR	17	Jack Iscaro		(substituted on) 47'
PR	18	Tonga Kofe		(substituted on) 42'
LK	19	Vili Helu		(substituted on) 19'
FL	20	Christian Poidevin		(substituted on) 64'
FL	21	Makeen Alikhan		(substituted on) 52'
SH	22	Juan-Philip Smith		(substituted on) 52'
WG	23	Lauina Futi		(substituted on) 65'
Coach:
(United States) Scott Lawrence

FB	15	Joe Carpenter
RW	14	Immanuel Feyi-Waboso
OC	13	Luke Northmore	(substituted off) 61'
IC	12	Max Ojomoh
LW	11	Cadan Murley
FH	10	George Ford (c)	(substituted off) 62'
SH	9	Jack van Poortvliet	(substituted off) 53'
N8	8	Alex Dombrandt	(substituted off) 51'
OF	7	Guy Pepper
BF	6	Chandler Cunningham-South	(substituted off) 65'
RL	5	Arthur Clark
LL	4	Alex Coles
TP	3	Asher Opoku-Fordjour	(substituted off) 64'
HK	2	Curtis Langdon	(substituted off) 65'
LP	1	Bevan Rodd	(substituted off) 50'
Substitutions:
HK	16	Gabriel Oghre	(substituted on) 65'
PR	17	Fin Baxter	(substituted on) 50'
PR	18	Trevor Davison	(substituted on) 64'
FL	19	Ted Hill	(substituted on) 65'
FL	20	Ben Curry	(substituted on) 51'
SH	21	Harry Randall	(substituted on) 53'
FH	22	Charlie Atkinson	(substituted on) 62'
CE	23	Oscar Beard	(substituted on) 61'
Coach:
(England) Steve Borthwick

Assistant referees:
Morné Ferreira (South Africa)
Robin Kaluzniak (Canada)
Television match official:
Matteo Liperini (Italy)

Notes:

- Ezekiel Lindenmuth, Rufus McLean (both USA), Charlie Atkinson, Oscar Beard, Joe Carpenter, Arthur Clark, Gabriel Oghre and Max Ojomoh (all England) made their international debuts.

=== 26 July ===
26 July 2025
20:00 AEST (UTC+10)

Australia	26–29	British and Irish Lions
Try: Slipper 22' m Gordon 27' c Wright 30' m Con: Lynagh (1/3) 28'; Pen: Lynagh (3/3) 4', 10', 53'	Report	Try: Sheehan 15' m Curry 34' m Jones 37' c Beirne 59' c Keenan 79' m Con: Russell (2/5) 38', 60'

Melbourne Cricket Ground, Melbourne
Attendance: 90,307
Referee: Andrea Piardi (Italy)

Team details

FB	15	Tom Wright
RW	14	Max Jorgensen
OC	13	Joseph Sua'ali'i
IC	12	Len Ikitau
LW	11	Harry Potter	(substituted off) 19'
FH	10	Tom Lynagh
SH	9	Jake Gordon
N8	8	Harry Wilson (c)
OF	7	Fraser McReight	(substituted off) 60'
BF	6	Rob Valetini	(substituted off) 40'
RL	5	Will Skelton	(substituted off) 47'
LL	4	Nick Frost
TP	3	Allan Alaalatoa	(substituted off) 40'
HK	2	Dave Porecki	(substituted off) 56'
LP	1	James Slipper	(substituted off) 40'
Substitutions:
HK	16	Billy Pollard	(substituted on) 56'
PR	17	Angus Bell	(substituted on) 40'
PR	18	Tom Robertson	(substituted on) 40'
LK	19	Jeremy Williams	(substituted on) 47'
FL	20	Langi Gleeson	(substituted on) 40'
FL	21	Carlo Tizzano	(substituted on) 60'
SH	22	Tate McDermott	(substituted on) 19'
FH	23	Ben Donaldson
Coach:
Joe Schmidt

FB	15	Hugo Keenan
RW	14	Tommy Freeman	(yellow card) 23'
OC	13	Huw Jones		(substituted off) 60'
IC	12	Bundee Aki
LW	11	James Lowe		(substituted off) 60'
FH	10	Finn Russell
SH	9	Jamison Gibson-Park
N8	8	Jack Conan
OF	7	Tom Curry		(substituted off) 54'
BF	6	Tadhg Beirne
RL	5	Ollie Chessum		(substituted off) 54'
LL	4	Maro Itoje (c)
TP	3	Tadhg Furlong		(substituted off) 64'
HK	2	Dan Sheehan		(substituted off) 64'
LP	1	Andrew Porter		(substituted off) 54'
Substitutions:
HK	16	Rónan Kelleher		(substituted on) 64'
PR	17	Ellis Genge		(substituted on) 54'
PR	18	Will Stuart		(substituted on) 64'
LK	19	James Ryan		(substituted on) 54'
FL	20	Jac Morgan		(substituted on) 54'
SH	21	Alex Mitchell
FH	22	Owen Farrell		(substituted on) 60'
FB	23	Blair Kinghorn		(substituted on) 60'
Coach:
Andy Farrell

Player of the Match:
Maro Itoje (British and Irish Lions)

Assistant referees:
Nika Amashukeli (Georgia)
Ben O'Keeffe (New Zealand)
Television match official:
Eric Gauzins (France)
Foul play review officer:
Marius Jonker (South Africa)

=== 2 August ===
2 August 2025
20:00 AEST (UTC+10)

Australia	22–12	British & Irish Lions
Try: Pietsch 7' m Jorgensen 54' c McDermott 70'; Con: Donaldson (2/2) 55', 71'; Pen: Lynagh (1/1) 33'	Report	Try: Morgan 61' c Stuart 79' m Con: Russell (1/2) 62'

Stadium Australia, Sydney
Attendance: 80,312
Referee: Nika Amashukeli (Georgia)

Team details

FB	15	Tom Wright
RW	14	Max Jorgensen	(substituted off) 77'
OC	13	Joseph Sua'ali'i
IC	12	Len Ikitau
LW	11	Dylan Pietsch
FH	10	Tom Lynagh	(substituted off) 33'
SH	9	Nic White	(substituted off) 58'
N8	8	Harry Wilson (c)
OF	7	Fraser McReight
BF	6	Tom Hooper	(substituted off) 77'
RL	5	Will Skelton	(substituted off) 63'
LL	4	Nick Frost
TP	3	Taniela Tupou	(substituted off) 60'
HK	2	Billy Pollard	(substituted off) 72'
LP	1	James Slipper	(substituted off) 57'
Substitutions:
HK	16	Brandon Paenga-Amosa	(substituted on) 72'
PR	17	Angus Bell	(substituted on) 57'
PR	18	Zane Nonggorr	(substituted on) 60'
LK	19	Jeremy Williams	(substituted on) 63'
FL	20	Langi Gleeson	(substituted on) 77'
SH	21	Tate McDermott	(substituted on) 58'
FH	22	Ben Donaldson	(substituted on) 33'
WG	23	Andrew Kellaway	(substituted on) 77'
Coach:
Joe Schmidt

FB	15	Hugo Keenan
RW	14	Tommy Freeman		(substituted off) 37'
OC	13	Huw Jones
IC	12	Bundee Aki
LW	11	Blair Kinghorn
FH	10	Finn Russell
SH	9	Jamison Gibson-Park		(substituted off) 71'
N8	8	Jack Conan		(substituted off) 62'
OF	7	Tom Curry			(substituted off) 68'
BF	6	Tadhg Beirne
RL	5	James Ryan		(substituted off) 42'
LL	4	Maro Itoje (c)		(substituted off) 27'
TP	3	Tadhg Furlong		(substituted off) 57'
HK	2	Dan Sheehan		(substituted off) 57'	(substituted on) 68'
LP	1	Andrew Porter		(substituted off) 42'
Substitutions:
HK	16	Rónan Kelleher	(yellow card) 68'	(substituted on) 57'
PR	17	Ellis Genge		(substituted on) 42'
PR	18	Will Stuart		(substituted on) 57'
LK	19	Ollie Chessum		(substituted on) 27'
FL	20	Jac Morgan		(substituted on) 42'
FL	21	Ben Earl		(substituted on) 62'
SH	22	Alex Mitchell		(substituted on) 71'
FH	23	Owen Farrell		(substituted on) 37'
Coach:
Andy Farrell

Player of the Match:
Tom Hooper (Australia)

Assistant referees:
Ben O'Keeffe (New Zealand)
Andrea Piardi (Italy)
Television match official:
Marius Jonker (South Africa)
Foul play review officer:
Richard Kelly (New Zealand)

== See also ==
- 2027 Men's Rugby World Cup qualifying
- 2025 end-of-year rugby union tests
- 2025 British & Irish Lions tour to Australia
- 2025 Pacific Nations Cup
- 2025 Rugby Championship
- 2025 World Rugby U20 Championship
