= 2024 France rugby union tour of Argentina and Uruguay =

- Coach: Fabien Galthié
- Tour captain: Baptiste Serin
- Top test point scorer: Antoine Hastoy (10)
- Top test try scorer: 3 players tied (1)
Summary
P	W	D	L
Total
3	2	0	1
Test match
2	1	0	1
Opponent
P	W	D	L
Argentina
2	1	0	1
Uruguay
1	1	0	0

Tour chronology
- ← Japan 2022 New Zealand 2025 →

In July 2024, the France rugby union team toured Argentina and Uruguay (their fifteenth overall), as part of the conventional Summer International calendar. Starting in 2012, France has toured Argentina in a two-test series in the year directly following the Rugby World Cup (RWC). However, due to the COVID-19 pandemic, the 2020 tour was cancelled.

Reported in April 2023, the Ligue Nationale de Rugby (LNR) announced key dates for the 2023–24 season, with news of a French tour of Argentina. As the tour is only on a two-test basis, speculation mounted over a possible third match against either Chile or Uruguay. A match against Uruguay was confirmed in April 2024. France were also scheduled to play a match against a World XV at the San Mamés Stadium in Bilbao, Spain, as a pre-tour warm-up on 22 June; however, this match was cancelled in May 2024 after the organisers failed to satisfy safety and security conditions.

As well as being toured by France more than any other team, France is also Argentina's most-played fixture, having faced each other more than 50 times. It is also expected to be France coach Fabien Galthié's first tour of Argentina, and the first international tests for new Pumas coach Felipe Contepomi, who captained Argentina against France on their 2012 tour.

== Fixtures ==
Date	Home	Score	Away	Venue	City
22 June	France	– (Note: Match cancelled due to "organisational problems" according to French reports.)	World XV	San Mamés	Bilbao
6 July	Argentina	13–28	France	Malvinas Argentinas	Mendoza
10 July	Uruguay	28–43	France	Charrúa	Montevideo
13 July	Argentina	33–25	France	José Amalfitani	Buenos Aires

== Matches ==
=== France vs World XV ===
22 June 2024

France	Cancelled	World XV

San Mamés Stadium, Bilbao, Spain

=== Argentina vs France (1st test) ===
6 July 2024
16:10 ART (UTC-03)

Argentina	13–28	France
Try: Montoya 61' m Orlando 78' m Pen: S.Carreras (1/1) 26'		Try: Serin 36' c Frisch 45' c Attissogbé 67' m Con: Hastoy (2/3) 37', 46'; Pen: Hastoy (2/2) 23', 56'; Jaminet (1/1) 76'

Estadio Malvinas Argentinas, Mendoza
Attendance: 36,000
Referee: Chris Busby (Ireland)

Team details

Argentina
France

FB	15	Martín Bogado	(substituted off) 45'
RW	14	Bautista Delguy
OC	13	Matías Moroni
IC	12	Jerónimo de la Fuente	(substituted off) 69'
LW	11	Mateo Carreras
FH	10	Santiago Carreras
SH	9	Gonzalo Bertranou	(substituted off) 45'
N8	8	Joaquín Oviedo
OF	7	Marcos Kremer
BF	6	Pablo Matera
RL	5	Lucas Paulos	(substituted off) 69'
LL	4	Matías Alemanno	(substituted off) 56'
TP	3	Eduardo Bello	(substituted off) 52'
HK	2	Julián Montoya (c)	(substituted off) 59'
LP	1	Thomas Gallo	(substituted off) 52'
Substitutions:
HK	16	Ignacio Ruiz	(substituted in) 59'
PR	17	Mayco Vivas	(substituted in) 52'
PR	18	Lucio Sordoni	(substituted in) 52'
LK	19	Franco Molina	(substituted in) 56'
FL	20	Juan Bautista Pedemonte	(substituted in) 69'
SH	21	Lautaro Bazán	(substituted in) 45'
FH	22	Tomás Albornoz	(substituted in) 45'
CE	23	Matías Orlando	(substituted in) 69'
Coach:
(Argentina) Felipe Contepomi

FB	15	Léo Barré	(substituted off) 72'
RW	14	Théo Attissogbé
OC	13	Émilien Gailleton
IC	12	Antoine Frisch
LW	11	Lester Etien
FH	10	Antoine Hastoy
SH	9	Baptiste Serin (c)	(substituted off) 70'
N8	8	Jordan Joseph	(substituted off) 69'
OF	7	Oscar Jegou
BF	6	Lenni Nouchi
RL	5	Baptiste Pesenti	(substituted off) 52'
LL	4	Hugo Auradou	(substituted off) 52'
TP	3	Georges-Henri Colombe	(substituted off) 52'
HK	2	Gaëtan Barlot	(substituted off) 67'
LP	1	Jean-Baptiste Gros	(substituted off) 59'
Replacements:
HK	16	Teddy Baubigny	(substituted in) 67'
PR	17	Sébastien Taofifénua	(substituted in) 59'
PR	18	Demba Bamba	(substituted in) 52'
LK	19	Posolo Tuilagi	(substituted in) 52'
FL	20	Mickaël Guillard	(substituted in) 52'
FL	21	Ibrahim Diallo	(substituted in) 69'
SH	22	Baptiste Couilloud	(substituted in) 70'
FB	23	Melvyn Jaminet	(substituted in) 72'
Coach:
(France) Fabien Galthié

Assistant referees:
Andrew Brace (Ireland)
Eoghan Cross (Ireland)
Television match official:
Marius van der Westhuizen (South Africa)
Foul play review officer:
Quinton Immelman (South Africa)

Notes:

- Franco Molina, Juan Bautista Pedemonte (both Argentina), Théo Attissogbé, Hugo Auradou, Lester Etien, Antoine Frisch, Mickaël Guillard, Oscar Jegou, Jordan Joseph and Lenni Nouchi (all France) made their international debuts.

=== Uruguay vs France ===
10 July 2024
14:00 UYT (UTC-03)

Uruguay	28–43	France
Try: Kessler 27' c Arcos Pérez 43' c Pujadas 65' c Penalty try 78'; Con: Etcheverry (3/3) 28', 44', 65'		Try: Couilloud (2) 8' c, 19' c Tuilagi (2) 60' c, 63' c Con: Berdeu (2/2) 9', 20'; Segonds (2/2) 61', 64'; Pen: Berdeu (5) 6', 32', 40', 46', 52'

Estadio Charrúa, Montevideo
Referee: Angus Mabey (New Zealand)

Team details

Uruguay
France

FB	15	Baltazar Amaya
RW	14	Mateo Viñals	(substituted off) 78'
OC	13	Felipe Arcos Pérez
IC	12	Andrés Vilaseca (c)
LW	11	Bautista Basso
FH	10	Felipe Etcheverry
SH	9	Santiago Arata	(substituted off) 26'
N8	8	Manuel Diana	(substituted off) 49'
OF	7	Santiago Civetta	(substituted off) 58'
BF	6	Manuel Ardao
RL	5	Manuel Leindekar
LL	4	Felipe Aliaga	(substituted off) 75'
TP	3	Reinaldo Piussi	(substituted off) 61'
HK	2	Germán Kessler	(substituted off) 58'
LP	1	Mateo Sanguinetti	(substituted off) 49'
Substitutions:
HK	16	Guillermo Pujadas	(substituted in) 58'
PR	17	Ignacio Péculo	(substituted in) 49'
PR	18	Diego Arbelo	(substituted in) 61'
LK	19	Ignacio Dotti	(substituted in) 75'
FL	20	Lucas Bianchi	(substituted in) 49'
N8	21	Carlos Deus	(substituted in) 58'
CE	22	Tomás Inciarte	(substituted in) 26'
WG	23	Ignacio Álvarez	(substituted in) 78'
Coach:
(Argentina) Rodolfo Ambrosio

FB	15	Lucas Dubois	(substituted off) 64'
RW	14	Jules Favre
OC	13	Arthur Vincent
IC	12	Léon Darricarrère
LW	11	Joris Jurand
FH	10	Léo Berdeu	(substituted off) 55'
SH	9	Baptiste Couilloud (c)	(substituted off) 50'
N8	8	Killian Tixeront	(substituted off) 50'
OF	7	Romain Briatte
BF	6	Ibrahim Diallo
RL	5	Florent Vanverberghe
LL	4	Pierre-Henri Azagoh	(substituted off) 59'
TP	3	Thomas Laclayat	(substituted off) 17'
HK	2	Teddy Baubigny	(substituted off) 50'
LP	1	Giorgi Beria	(substituted off) 59'
Replacements:
HK	16	Jannick Tarrit	(substituted in) 50'
PR	17	Sébastien Taofifénua	(substituted in) 59'
PR	18	Demba Bamba	(substituted in) 59'
LK	19	Posolo Tuilagi	(substituted in) 59'
FL	20	Yann Peysson	(substituted in) 50'
SH	21	Baptiste Jauneau	(substituted in) 50'
FH	22	Joris Segonds	(substituted in) 55'
WG	23	Nathanaël Hulleu	(substituted in) 64'
Coach:
(France) Fabien Galthié

Assistant referees:
Gonzalo de Achaval (Argentina)
Tomás Bertazza (Argentina)

Notes:

- Santiago Arata (Uruguay) earned his 50th test cap.
- This was the first time Uruguay has hosted France in a test match.

=== Argentina vs France (2nd test) ===
13 July 2024
16:00 ART (UTC-03)

Argentina	33–25	France
Try: Bello 16' c Penalty try 29'; S. Carreras 36' c Gallo (2) 57' m, 66' c Con: S. Carreras (3/4) 18', 38', 66'		Try: Serin 9' c Gailleton 45' c Attissogbé 49' m Con: Hastoy (2/3) 10', 46'; Pen: Hastoy (2/2) 24', 41'

José Amalfitani Stadium, Buenos Aires
Attendance: 50,000
Referee: Andrew Brace (Ireland)

Team details

Argentina
France

FB	15	Santiago Cordero
RW	14	Bautista Delguy	(substituted off) 56'
OC	13	Matías Moroni
IC	12	Santiago Chocobares
LW	11	Mateo Carreras
FH	10	Santiago Carreras	(substituted off) 71'
SH	9	Lautaro Bazán Velez	(substituted off) 46'
N8	8	Joaquín Oviedo
OF	7	Marcos Kremer
BF	6	Pablo Matera
RL	5	Lucas Paulos	(substituted off) 56'
LL	4	Franco Molina	(substituted off) 48'
TP	3	Eduardo Bello	(substituted off) 48'
HK	2	Julián Montoya (c)	(substituted off) 21'
LP	1	Mayco Vivas	(substituted off) 40'
Substitutions:
HK	16	Ignacio Ruiz	(substituted in) 21'
PR	17	Thomas Gallo	(substituted in) 40'
PR	18	Lucio Sordoni	(substituted in) 48'
LK	19	Matías Alemanno	(substituted in) 48'
LK	20	Pedro Rubiolo	(substituted in) 56'
SH	21	Gonzalo Bertranou	(substituted in) 46'
FH	22	Tomás Albornoz	(substituted in) 56'
CE	23	Matías Orlando	(substituted in) 71'
Coach:
(Argentina) Felipe Contepomi

FB	15	Léo Barré
RW	14	Théo Attissogbé
OC	13	Émilien Gailleton
IC	12	Antoine Frisch
LW	11	Lester Etien
FH	10	Antoine Hastoy
SH	9	Baptiste Serin (c)		(substituted off) 67'
N8	8	Jordan Joseph		(substituted off) 40'
OF	7	Judicaël Cancoriet
BF	6	Lenni Nouchi
RL	5	Baptiste Pesenti		(substituted off) 40'
LL	4	Mickaël Guillard		(substituted off) 62'
TP	3	Georges-Henri Colombe	(yellow card) 56'	(substituted off) 26'	(substituted in) 41'
HK	2	Gaëtan Barlot
LP	1	Jean-Baptiste Gros		(substituted off) 56'
Replacements:
HK	16	Teddy Baubigny		(substituted in) 62'	(substituted off) 67'
PR	17	Sébastien Taofifénua		(substituted in) 56'
PR	18	Demba Bamba		(substituted in) 26'	(substituted off) 41'
LK	19	Posolo Tuilagi		(substituted in) 40'	(substituted off) 62'	(substituted in) 67'
FL	20	Romain Briatte		(substituted in) 40'
FL	21	Killian Tixeront			(substituted in) 67'
SH	22	Baptiste Jauneau		(substituted in) 67'
FH	23	Léo Berdeu
Coach:
(France) Fabien Galthié

Assistant referees:
Chris Busby (Ireland)
Eoghan Cross (Ireland)
Television match official:
Quinton Immelman (South Africa)
Foul play review officer:
Marius van der Westhuizen (South Africa)

Notes:

- Pablo Matera (Argentina) became the third Argentine player to earn his 100th test cap.
- Romain Briatte, Baptiste Jauneau and Killian Tixeront (all France) made their international debuts.
- Argentina win a home test match for the first time since their 48–17 victory over Australia during the 2022 Rugby Championship.
- Argentina earn their first win over France since 2016.

== Sexual assault cases ==
On 8 July 2024, two French rugby players, Pau lock Hugo Auradou and the La Rochelle flanker Oscar Jégou, were both arrested in Buenos Aires, Argentina on sexual abuse charges. Both men allegedly attacked a woman while at the Diplomatic Hotel in Mendoza, Argentina on 6 July 2024 while the Les Bleus tour was underway in the area.

On 12 August 2024 both players were released, although they were not allowed to leave Argentina, being forced to remain in the country until the trial begins. The judge based his decision on contradictions about how the events happened and the existence of consent from the alleged victim.

== See also ==
- 2024 mid-year rugby union tests
- 2024 England rugby union tour of New Zealand
- 2024 Ireland rugby union tour of South Africa
- 2024 Wales rugby union tour of Australia
