= Alfonso Escobar =

Alfonso Escobar may refer to:

- Alfonso Escobar (rugby union, fl. 1984–2006), Chilean rugby union player
- Alfonso Escobar (rugby union, born 1997), his son, Chilean rugby union player
