= Agustín Moyano =

Argentine rugby union player

- Born: 12 June 2003 (age 23) Córdoba, Argentina
- Height: 173 cm (5 ft 8 in)
- Weight: 75 kg (165 lb; 11 st 11 lb)

Rugby union career
- Position: Scrum-half
- Current team: Force
Youth career
- –2023: Córdoba Athletic
Senior career
Years	Team	Apps	(Points)
2023–2025	Dogos XV		
2026–	Force	6	(0)
- Correct as of 30 May 2026
International career
Years	Team	Apps	(Points)
2023	Argentina U20	5	(5)
2025–	Argentina	10	(10)
- Correct as of 13 August 2026

Agustín Moyano (born 12 June 2003) is an Argentine rugby union player who plays as a scrum-half for the Super Rugby club, the Western Force and the Argentina national team.

== Early career ==
Moyano was born in Córdoba in Argentina's central Córdoba Province. He played his junior rugby for Córdoba Athletic, and was selected for the Argentina U20s team while at the club.

== Career ==
=== Dogos ===
Moyano's first professional contract was for the Dogos XV who he first signed for in 2023. He was named in the side again in 2024 when they won the 2024 Super Rugby Americas competition.

=== Force ===
In November 2025, Moyano signed for the Force ahead of the 2026 Super Rugby season. Moyano was one of two Force signings that joined from Dogos, the other being Leonel Oviedo, and one of three Argentine players to transfer to the Force in the 2025–26 off-season.

In his debut Super Rugby season, Moyano played six games, all as a finisher. His standout skill during the season was his passing accuracy, holding a with a completion rate of 93%. Moyano came on as a substitute in the final three rounds of the 2026 season for the Force as they went on a three-match win streak, although just missed out on a finals spot. In August 2026, Moyano re-signed for the Force ahead of the 2027 season.

== International career ==
While playing for Dogos XV in the Super Rugby Americas, his performances earned him selection for the Argentina national team, making his Test debut in July 2025 against England. In just his second Test for Argentina, Moyanao scored his first Test try, coming against South American neighbours Uruguay. Argentina won 52–17 in Salta.

The following year, Moyano had become a regular halfback option for Argentina alongside Gonzalo García. He scored his second Test try against Scotland in Argentina's first round match of the 2026 Nations Championship. Argentina lost 38–47.

== Career statistics ==
=== Club ===
As of 30 May 2026.

Statistics by club, season and competition
Club	Season	League			
Club	Season	Division	Apps	Tries	Points
Force	2026	Super Rugby Pacific	6	0	0
Force	2027	Super Rugby Pacific	TBD		
Force	Total		6	0	0

=== International ===
As of 8 August 2026.

Statistics by team and year
Team	Year	Statistic		
Team	Year	Apps	Tries	Points
Argentina	2025	8	1	5
Argentina	2026	2	1	5
Total		10	2	10

=== International tries ===
List of international tries scored by Agustín Moyano
No.	Opponent	Location	Competition	Date	Result	Ref.
1	Uruguay	Estadio Padre Ernesto Martearena, Salta	2025 July Tests	19 July 2025	52–17	
2	Scotland	Estadio Mario Alberto Kempes, Córdoba	2026 Nations Championship	4 July 2026	38–47	
