= Antoine Frisch =

France international rugby union player (born 1996)

- Born: 1 June 1996 (age 30) Fontainebleau, France
- Height: 1.88 m (6 ft 2 in)
- Weight: 98 kg (15.4 st; 216 lb)
- School: Lycée International François-Ier
- University: Loughborough University

Rugby union career
- Position: Centre
Amateur team(s)
Years	Team	Apps	(Points)
2004–2011	Rugby Sud 77		
2011–2013	Paris Université Club		
Senior career
Years	Team	Apps	(Points)
2018–2019	Tarbes	17	(41)
2019–2020	Massy	8	(25)
2020–2021	Rouen	25	(20)
2021–2022	Bristol Bears	13	(10)
2022–2024	Munster	40	(50)
2024–	Toulon	11	(0)
- Correct as of 25 February 2025
International career
Years	Team	Apps	(Points)
2022	Emerging Ireland	3	(0)
2023	Barbarians	1	(0)
2024–	France	2	(5)
- Correct as of 13 July 2024

Antoine Frisch (born 1 June 1996) is a French rugby union player who plays as a centre for Top 14 club Toulon.

== Career ==
=== France ===
Frisch played for Massy and Stade Français in their academy systems in his early career from 2013 to 2018, before signing a professional contract with Tarbes for the 2018–19 season. Frisch left Tarbes to rejoin to Massy in the Fédérale 1 competition for the 2019–20 season, and then joined their rivals Rouen for the 2020–21 season.

=== England ===
Frisch moved to England to join Bristol Bears, who compete in the Premiership Rugby competition, from the 2021–22 season. Frisch's final appearance for Bristol was in their 29–28 win against Gloucester on 22 April 2022, as a shoulder injury sustained during the game required surgery and ruled him out of the remainder of the season.

=== Ireland ===
Frisch, who is Irish-qualified via a grandmother who was born in Dublin, joined Irish province Munster on a three-year contract from the 2022–23 season, and made his senior competitive debut for the province as a replacement in their 20–13 defeat away to Welsh side Cardiff in round one of the 2022–23 United Rugby Championship on 17 September 2022. Frisch made his first start for Munster in their historic 28–14 win against a South Africa XV in Páirc Uí Chaoimh on 10 November 2022. He started in Munster's 19–14 win against the Stormers in the final of the 2022–23 United Rugby Championship on 27 May 2023.

== International ==
Frisch was selected in the Emerging Ireland squad that travelled to South Africa to participate in the Toyota Challenge against Currie Cup teams Free State Cheetahs, Griquas and Pumas in September–October 2022. He featured as a replacement in Emerging Ireland's 54–7 opening win against Griquas on 30 September, and started in the 28–24 win against the Pumas on 5 October. Frisch was selected in the French Barbarians squad to face Fiji on 19 November as part of the 2022 Autumn Nations Series, however, he had to withdraw from the squad due to a thigh issue.

On 6 July 2024, Frisch made his debut for the French national team in a Test series win against Argentina, scoring his first international try in the process.

=== International tries ===
International tries
No.	Date	Venue	Opponent	Score	Result	Competition
1	6 July 2024	Estadio Malvinas Argentinas, Mendoza, Argentina	Argentina	3–15	13–28	2024 Argentina and Uruguay test series

== Honours ==
=== Munster ===
- United Rugby Championship
  - Winner (1): 2022–23

France

- 1x Six Nations Championship: 2025
