= Lester Etien =

France international rugby union player

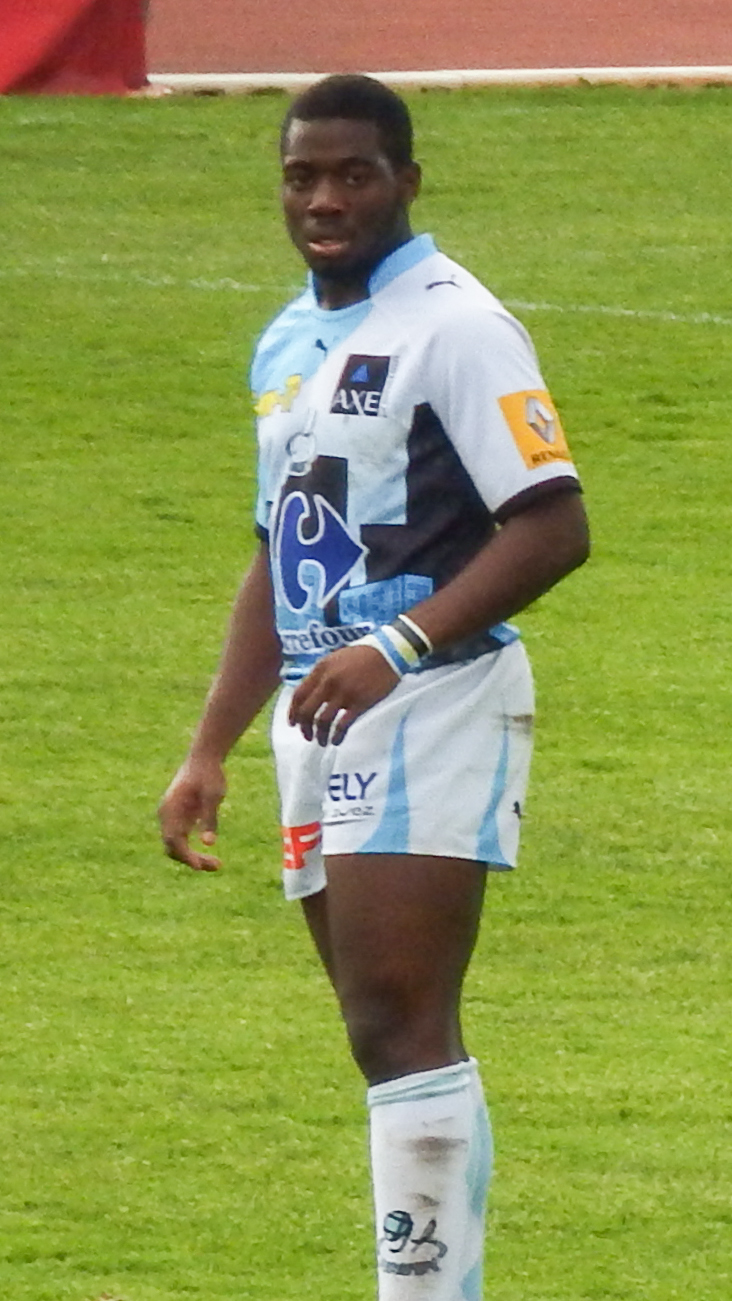
- Born: 21 June 1995 (age 31) Créteil, France
- Height: 1.81 m (5 ft 11 in)
- Weight: 96 kg (212 lb)

Rugby union career
- Position: Wing
- Current team: Stade Français
Senior career
Years	Team	Apps	(Points)
2014–2018	Massy	50	(50)
2018–	Stade Français	119	(150)
- Correct as of 23 October 2024
International career
Years	Team	Apps	(Points)
2024–	France	2	(0)
- Correct as of 13 July 2024

Lester Etien (born 21 June 1995) is a French rugby union player for Stade Français in the Top 14 and the French national team. He plays on the wing.
