= Teddy Baubigny =

France international rugby union player

- Born: 2 September 1998 (age 28) Meaux, France
- Height: 1.84 m (6 ft 0 in)
- Weight: 109 kg (240 lb; 17 st 2 lb)

Rugby union career
- Position: Hooker
Senior career
Years	Team	Apps	(Points)
2016–2022	Racing 92	106	(65)
2022–	Toulon	76	(30)
- Correct as of 3 September 2022
International career
Years	Team	Apps	(Points)
2020–	France	3	(0)
- Correct as of 13 July 2024

Teddy Baubigny (born 2 September 1998) is a French rugby union player. His position is hooker, and he currently plays for Toulon in the Top 14. He was named in the French squad for the 2020 Six Nations Championship.
