= Diego Escobar =

Chile international rugby union player

- Full name: Diego Escobar Alvarez
- Born: 17 April 2000 (age 26) Las Condes, Chile
- Height: 1.76 m (5 ft 9 in)
- Weight: 104 kg (229 lb; 16 st 5 lb)
- University: Universidad Adolfo Ibáñez

Rugby union career
- Position: Hooker
- Current team: Racing 92
Senior career
Years	Team	Apps	(Points)
2021–2024	Selknam	21	(30)
2024–	Racing 92	29	(10)
International career
Years	Team	Apps	(Points)
2021	Chile U20		
2019	Chile XV		
2021-	Chile	20	(30)

Diego Escobar (born April 17, 2000) is a Chilean international rugby union player who plays as a hooker for Top 14 club Racing 92 and the Chile national team.

== Career ==
Escobar signed for Súper Liga Americana de Rugby side Selknam from Craighouse Old Boys (COBS), his formative rugby club since 2019, ahead of the 2021 Súper Liga Americana de Rugby season. He played with Seknam until 2023 Super Rugby Americas season For 2024–25 season, he signed for French Top 14 team Racing 92.

== International career ==
Escobar played for young categories of the Chile national side. On 27 August, he was named in the 30-player squad for the 2023 Rugby World Cup.

== Personal life ==
Diego Escobar is the son of Alfonso Escobar, one of the emblematic figures of Chilean rugby, captain of the national team and holder of the record for national club championship titles, crowned 14 times, and the brother of Alfonso, the namesake of his father who also played in the 2023 Rugby World Cup.

== Honours ==
- Torneo Apertura: 2019
- Campeonato Nacional de Chile: 2021
