= Émilien Gailleton =

French international rugby union player (born 2003)

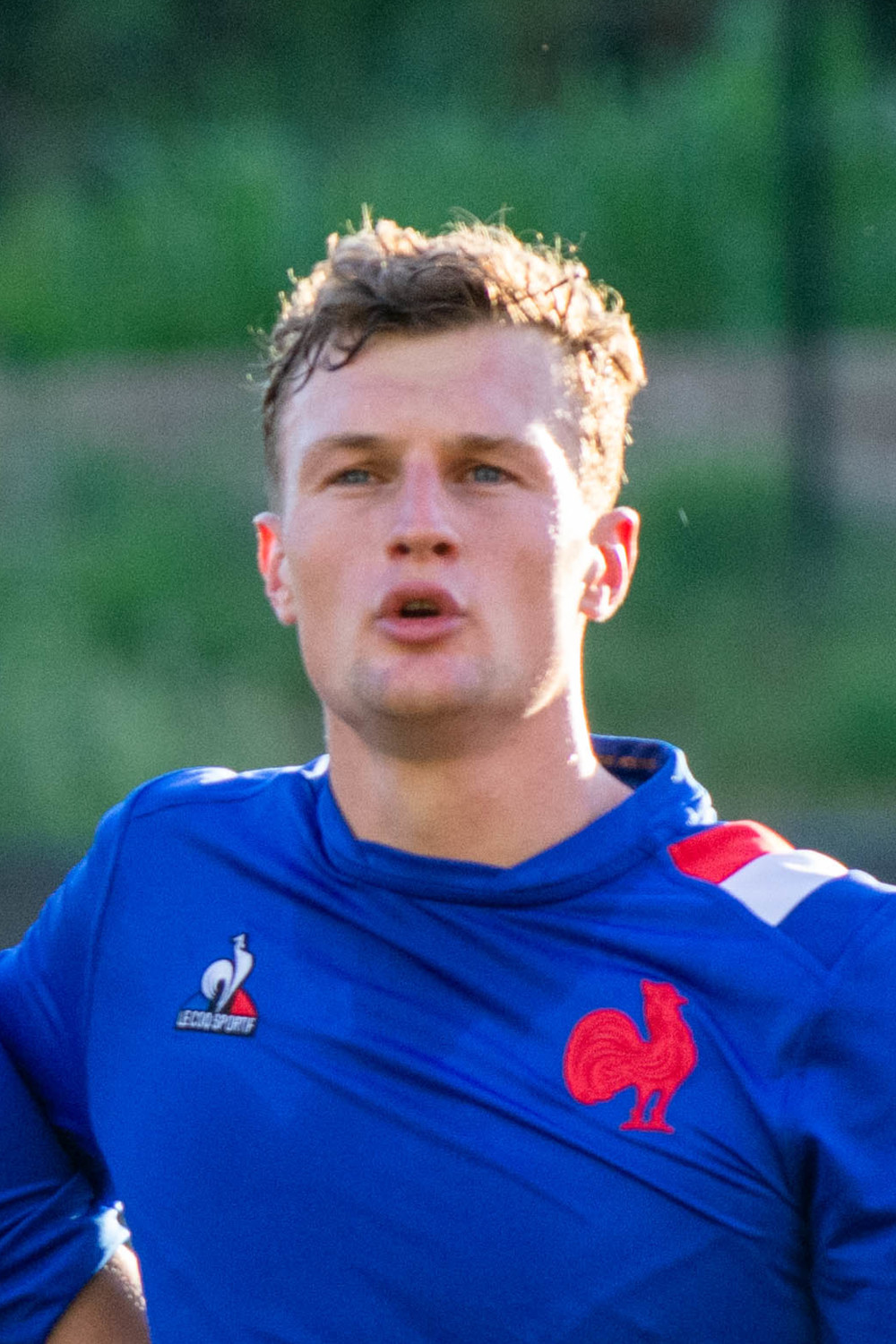
- Gailleton with France U20 in 2022
- Born: 13 July 2003 (age 23) Croydon, England
- Height: 1.85 m (6 ft 1 in)
- Weight: 89 kg (14 st 0 lb; 196 lb)

Rugby union career
- Position: Outside Centre
- Current team: Pau
Youth career
- 2008–2017: Cahors
- 2017–2021: Agen
Senior career
Years	Team	Apps	(Points)
2021–2022	Agen	15	(15)
2022–	Pau	92	(205)
- Correct as of 22 September 2026
International career
Years	Team	Apps	(Points)
2021–2023	France U20	16	(20)
2023–	France	13	(25)
- Correct as of 22 February 2026

Émilien Gailleton (French pronunciation: [emiljɛ̃ ɡajtɔ̃]; born 13 July 2003) is a French rugby union player, who plays as a centre for Top 14 club Section Paloise and the France national team.

== Early life and youth career ==
Émilien Gailleton was born in Croydon, England, to a French father and a British mother. He moved with his family to Cahors, Lot, at the age of three. He began playing rugby in 2008 with Cahors Rugby, before joining the SU Agen academy in 2017.

== Club career ==
=== SU Agen ===
Gailleton made his professional debut for SU Agen on 15 October 2021, at the age of 18, in a match against Rugby Club Vannes during the 2021–22 Rugby Pro D2 season.

=== Section Paloise ===
In December 2021, Gailleton signed with Section Paloise, joining them for the 2022–23 Top 14 season. Despite interest from ASM Clermont Auvergne and Stade Toulousain, he chose Pau, partly due to the opportunity to work again with Sébastien Piqueronies, whom he had known during his time at the Centre national du rugby in Marcoussis with the French youth teams.

During his first season in the Top 14, Gailleton scored 14 tries in 24 matches, finishing as the league’s top try-scorer. His performance earned him a nomination for the Oscars Midi Olympique in both the Espoir and Oscar d'Or categories and inclusion in the league's team of the season.

In the 2023–24 Top 14 season, Gailleton continued to develop as a player, evolving into a more well-rounded player although he faced stiff competition from other emerging talents. This apparent slowdown in his progression led to increased competition from emerging young talents in the France national team. Nevertheless, Gailleton seized upcoming opportunities during the end-of-season international tours. He concluded the season with eighteen line breaks in twenty-four Top 14 matches.

In the 2024–25 Top 14 season, Gailleton solidified his role as a central figure for Section Paloise, demonstrating his development into a complete player. He expanded his tactical repertoire, showcasing his ability to create plays, structure the defense, and regain offensive efficiency.

== International career ==
=== France U20 ===
Gailleton was selected for the France U20 team for the 2021 Six Nations Under 20s Championship at just 17. He played in four matches, starting in three. In 2022, he captained the team during the Six Nations Under 20s Championship, scoring a try against Scotland. He also played in the U20 Six Nations Summer Series, adding further international experience.

=== France senior team ===
On 30 October 2022, Gailleton was first called by Fabien Galthié to the France senior team for the Autumn internationals. Gailleton did not play. In 2023, he was included in the extended squad for the 2023 Six Nations Championship but was later released to rejoin the U20s team. He made his senior debut on 5 August 2023 in a test match against Scotland.

=== International tries ===
International tries
No.	Date	Venue	Opponent	Score	Result	Competition
1	13 July 2024	José Amalfitani Stadium, Buenos Aires, Argentina	Argentina	21–18	33–25	2024 Argentina and Uruguay test series
2	9 November 2024	Stade de France, Saint-Denis, France	Japan	10–0	52–12	2024 Autumn internationals
3	31 January 2025	Stade de France, Saint-Denis, France	Wales	38–0	43–0	2025 Six Nations
4	15 February 2026	Millennium Stadium, Cardiff, Wales	Wales	0–5	12–54	2026 Six Nations
5	22 February 2026	Stade Pierre-Mauroy, Villeneuve-d'Ascq, France	Italy	31–8	33–8	2026 Six Nations

== Personal life ==
Gailleton is bilingual, speaking both English and French fluently. His language skills have been useful in international competitions, especially when captaining the France U20 team.

== Honours ==
France

- 2x Six Nations Championship: 2025, 2026

Individual

- 1× Top 14 leading try-scorer: 2023 (14 tries)
- 1× Top 14 team of the season: 2023
- 1× Nuit du rugby Breakthrough Player of the Season: 2023
