= Thomas Crețu =

Romanian rugby union player

- Full name: Thomas Crețu
- Born: 5 March 2002 (age 24) Paris, France
- Height: 190 cm (6 ft 3 in)
- Weight: 136 kg (300 lb; 21 st 6 lb)

Rugby union career
- Position: Tight-head Prop
- Current team: US Dax
Youth career
- 2009–2015: Bonneuil Villeneuve
- 2015–2020: RC Massy
- 2020–2022: Stade Français
Senior career
Years	Team	Apps	(Points)
2022–2024	Stade Français	0	(0)
2023–2024	→ Aurillac (loan)	11	(0)
2024–2025	SC Albi	16	(15)
2025–	US Dax	2	(0)
International career
Years	Team	Apps	(Points)
2022	France U20	3	(0)
2023–	Romania	8	(0)
- Correct as of 29 April 2024

Thomas Crețu (born 5 March 2002) is a French-born Romanian professional rugby union player who currently plays for US Dax in the Pro D2.

== Club career ==
Crețu began playing at Bonneuil Villeneuve, before moving to RC Massy where in which he played for their Espoirs. In 2020, he joined Stade Français where he played for their Espoirs and their Sevens team.

In 2023, he was loaned to Aurillac in the Pro D2. He made his debut on 10 November 2023 coming off the bench in a 19–19 draw against Aix-en-Provence.

== International career ==
In 2022, Crețu was named in the France under-20 squad for the U20 Six Nations, featuring in 3 matches including starting against Wales.

In 2023, he made his debut for Romania in the 2023 Rugby Europe Championship, coming off the bench against Poland. He was named in the Romania squad for the 2023 Rugby World Cup.

== Personal life ==
Crețu was born in Paris, France to a Romanian father and a Guadeloupean mother.
