= Alfonso Escobar Snr. =

- Born: 9 October
- Height: 194 cm (6 ft 4 in)
- Weight: 114 kg (251 lb; 17 st 13 lb)

Rugby union career
- Position: Lock
Senior career
Years	Team	Apps	(Points)
1984–2006	Universidad Católica		
- Stade Français Paris
International career
Years	Team	Apps	(Points)
- Chile

Alfonso Escobar is a former Chilean rugby union player. He played Lock at an international level for Chile.

== Career ==
Escobar played for Universidad Católica, and Stade Français Paris. He won 14 national championships with Universidad Católica, between 1984 and 2006.

He captained Chile when they tried to qualify for the 1999 and 2003 Rugby World Cups.

He is the father of Chilean internationals, Alfonso and Diego Escobar.
