= Baptiste Jauneau =

French rugby union player

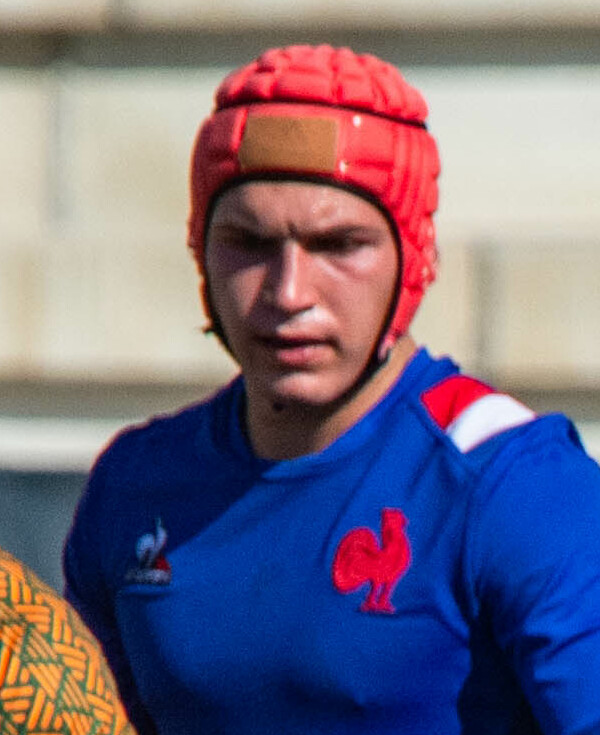
- Jauneau with France U20 in 2022
- Born: 17 November 2003 (age 22)
- Height: 1.78 m (5 ft 10 in)
- Weight: 81 kg (12 st 11 lb; 179 lb)

Rugby union career
- Position: Scrum-half
- Current team: Clermont
Youth career
- 2008–2014: Buzy-Ogeu
- 2014–2018: Oloron
- 2018–2021: Biarritz
Senior career
Years	Team	Apps	(Points)
2021–	Clermont	90	(67)
- Correct as of 17 December 2023
International career
Years	Team	Apps	(Points)
2022–2023	France U20	16	(10)
2024–	France	4	(0)
- Correct as of 22 November 2025

Baptiste Jauneau (born 17 November 2003) is a French professional rugby union player, who plays as a scrum-half for Top 14 side Clermont and the France national under-20 team. Born and raised in Béarn, France, he made his professional debut with Clermont on 4 December 2021.

== Honours ==
France U20

- World Rugby Under 20 Championship
  - (gold) Champion (1): 2023
- Six Nations Under 20s Championship
  - (silver) Runner-up (2): 2022, 2023
