= Alfonso Escobar (rugby union, born 1997) =

Chile international rugby union player

- Born: 17 August 1997 (age 29)
- Height: 183 cm (6 ft 0 in)
- Weight: 95 kg (209 lb; 14 st 13 lb)

Rugby union career
- Position: Flanker
Senior career
Years	Team	Apps	(Points)
2020–Present	Selknam		
International career
Years	Team	Apps	(Points)
2017	Chile U-20		
2018–Present	Chile	27	(0)
National sevens team
Years	Team		Comps
- Chile 7s

Alfonso Escobar (born 17 August 1997) is a Chilean rugby union player. He plays as a Flanker for Selknam in the Super Rugby Americas competition and at an international level for Chile.He competed for Chile in the 2023 Rugby World Cup.

== Career ==
Escobar played for Chile's Under-20 team in 2017. He has also represented Chile's national rugby sevens team.

He made his international debut for Chile against Brazil in 2018. In 2020, he joined Selknam in the Super Rugby Americas competition.

Escobar was selected in Chile's squad to the 2023 Rugby World Cup in France. He scored in his sides 42–12 loss to Japan in their opening game, it was Chile's first ever appearance in a World Cup. He was dropped to the bench for the game against Samoa.

== Personal life ==
His brother, Diego Escobar, plays Hooker for Chile. Their father, Alfonso also represented Chile in test rugby.
