= 2025 France rugby union tour of New Zealand =

- Date: 5–19 July 2025
- Coach: Fabien Galthié
- Tour captain: Gaël Fickou
- Top test point scorer: Nolann Le Garrec (30)
- Top test try scorer: Six players (1 try each)
Summary
P	W	D	L
Total
3	0	0	3
Test match
3	0	0	3
Opponent
P	W	D	L
New Zealand
3	0	0	3

Tour chronology
- ← South America 2024

In July 2025, the France national rugby team toured New Zealand as part of the Summer International calendar. It was known as the 2025 Lipovitan-D July Series in New Zealand for sponsorship reasons, the three-test tour was publicly known as early as July 2024, with French media reporting that the French squad could possibly be without its key, top-performing players as the tour would also conflict with the current domestic competition in France. The domestic competition final took place just a week before the first tour match in Dunedin. It was also reported that the tour would allow for a new generation of French players to pick up more international caps and experience in preparation for the 2027 Rugby World Cup (RWC) in Australia.

Both national unions were in talks of moving one of the three test matches to be hosted in the United States, however the French Rugby Federation reportedly rejected the idea. It was France's eleventh tour of New Zealand and the eighteenth test-series between the two teams. It was Fabien Galthié's first tour of New Zealand as the head coach of France. The venue for the third test was held at Waikato Stadium in Hamilton on New Zealand's North Island. It was the first international test France has played at the venue.

== Fixtures ==
Date	Venue	Home	Score	Away
21 June 2025	Twickenham Stadium, London	England XV	24–26	France XV
5 July 2025	Forsyth Barr Stadium, Dunedin	New Zealand	31–27	France
12 July 2025	Sky Stadium, Wellington	New Zealand	43–17	France
19 July 2025	Waikato Stadium, Hamilton	New Zealand	29–19	France

== Matches ==
=== England XV vs France XV ===
21 June 2025
15:15 BST (UTC+1)

England XV	24–26	France XV
Try: Willis 23' c Coles 27' m Carpenter 39' c Dombrandt 59' m Con: Ford (2/4) 23', 40'	Report	Try: Barlot 6' m Auradou 9' c Malez 74' c Taofifénua 80+1' c Con: Le Garrec (1/2) 10'; Hastoy (2/2) 75', 80+2'

Twickenham Stadium, London
Attendance: 34,129
Referee: Hollie Davidson (Scotland)

FB	15	Joe Carpenter		(substituted off) 60'
RW	14	Tom Roebuck
OC	13	Henry Slade
IC	12	Seb Atkinson
LW	11	Immanuel Feyi-Waboso	(red card) 33'
FH	10	George Ford (cc)
SH	9	Ben Spencer
N8	8	Tom Willis		(substituted off) 55'
OF	7	Guy Pepper		(substituted off) 60'
BF	6	Ted Hill
RL	5	Nick Isiekwe		(substituted off) 69'
LL	4	Alex Coles
TP	3	Joe Heyes		(substituted off) 60'
HK	2	Jamie George (cc)		(substituted off) 67'
LP	1	Fin Baxter		(substituted off) 54'
Substitutions:
HK	16	Theo Dan		(substituted on) 67'
PR	17	Bevan Rodd		(substituted on) 54'
PR	18	Trevor Davison		(substituted on) 60'
LK	19	Chandler Cunningham-South		(substituted on) 69'
FL	20	Jack Kenningham		(substituted on) 60'
N8	21	Alex Dombrandt		(substituted on) 55'
SH	22	Raffi Quirke		(substituted on) 60'
CE	23	Oscar Beard		(substituted on) 53'
Coach:
(England) Steve Borthwick

FB	15	Théo Attissogbe		(substituted off) 40'
RW	14	Maël Moustin		(substituted off) 46'
OC	13	Émilien Gailleton
IC	12	Gaël Fickou (c)
LW	11	Alivereti Duguivalu
FH	10	Antoine Hastoy
SH	9	Nolann Le Garrec		(substituted off) 60'
N8	8	Mickaël Guillard
OF	7	Killian Tixeront
BF	6	Alexandre Fischer
RL	5	Tyler Duguid		(substituted off) 46'	(substituted on) 77'
LL	4	Hugo Auradou		(substituted off) 46'
TP	3	Rabah Slimani		(substituted off) 46'
HK	2	Gaëtan Barlot		(substituted off) 60'
LP	1	Baptiste Erdocio		(substituted off) 46'
Substitutions:
HK	16	Guillaume Marchand		(substituted on) 60'
PR	17	Paul Mallez		(substituted on) 46'
PR	18	Demba Bamba		(substituted on) 46'
LK	19	Romain Taofifénua		(substituted on) 46'
FL	20	Cameron Woki	(red card) 55'	(substituted on) 46'
FL	21	Jacobus van Tonder		(substituted on) 46'
SH	22	Baptiste Jauneau		(substituted on) 60'
FH	23	Léo Berdeu		(substituted on) 40'
Coach:
(France) Fabien Galthié

Player of the Match:
Nolann Le Garrec (France XV)

Assistant referees:
Sam Grove-White (Scotland)
Ben Breakspear (Wales)
Television match official:
Mike Adamson (Scotland)

=== New Zealand vs France (first test) ===
5 July 2025
19:05 NZST (UTC+12)

New Zealand	31–27	France
Try: Jordan (2) 20' c, 47' c Vaa'i 26' c J. Barrett 40' c Con: B. Barrett (4/4) 21', 27', 40', 48'; Pen: B. Barrett (1/1) 74'	Report	Try: Guillard 17' c Villière 43' c Woki 50' c Con: Le Garrec (3/3) 18', 44', 50'; Pen: Segonds (1/1) 7'; Le Garrec (1/1) 33'

Forsyth Barr Stadium, Dunedin
Attendance: 28,532
Referee: Nic Berry (Australia)

FB	15	Will Jordan
RW	14	Sevu Reece	(substituted off) 1'
OC	13	Billy Proctor	(substituted off) 66'
IC	12	Jordie Barrett
LW	11	Rieko Ioane
FH	10	Beauden Barrett
SH	9	Cam Roigard	(substituted off) 60'
N8	8	Christian Lio-Willie	(substituted off) 51'
OF	7	Ardie Savea
BF	6	Tupou Vaa'i
RL	5	Fabian Holland
LL	4	Scott Barrett (c)	(substituted off) 58'
TP	3	Fletcher Newell	(substituted off) 56'
HK	2	Codie Taylor	(substituted off) 58'
LP	1	Ethan de Groot	(substituted off) 56'
Substitutions:
HK	16	Samisoni Taukei'aho	(substituted on) 58'
PR	17	Ollie Norris	(substituted on) 56'
PR	18	Pasilio Tosi	(substituted on) 56'
FL	19	Samipeni Finau	(substituted on) 58'
FL	20	Du'Plessis Kirifi	(substituted on) 51'
SH	21	Cortez Ratima	(substituted on) 60'
CE	22	Quinn Tupaea	(substituted on) 66'
FH	23	Damian McKenzie	(substituted on) 1'
Coach:
(New Zealand) Scott Robertson

FB	15	Théo Attissogbé
RW	14	Tom Spring		(substituted off) 72'
OC	13	Émilien Gailleton
IC	12	Gaël Fickou (c)
LW	11	Gabin Villière	(yellow card) 55'
FH	10	Joris Segonds		(substituted off) 64'
SH	9	Nolann Le Garrec		(substituted off) 58'
N8	8	Mickaël Guillard
OF	7	Killian Tixeront		(substituted off) 48'
BF	6	Alexandre Fischer
RL	5	Tyler Duguid		(substituted off) 48'
LL	4	Hugo Auradou		(substituted off) 48'
TP	3	Rabah Slimani		(substituted off) 48'
HK	2	Gaëtan Barlot		(substituted off) 56'
LP	1	Giorgi Beria		(substituted off) 48'
Substitutions:
HK	16	Pierre Bourgarit		(substituted on) 56'
PR	17	Paul Mallez		(substituted on) 48'
PR	18	Régis Montagne		(substituted on) 48'
LK	19	Romain Taofifénua		(substituted on) 48'
LK	20	Cameron Woki		(substituted on) 48'
FL	21	Jacobus van Tonder		(substituted on) 48'
SH	22	Baptiste Jauneau		(substituted on) 58'
FH	23	Antoine Hastoy		(substituted on) 64'
Coach:
(France) Fabien Galthié

Player of the Match:
Will Jordan (New Zealand)

Assistant referees:
Christophe Ridley (England)
Takehito Namekawa (Japan)
Television match official:
Damon Murphy (Australia)
Foul play review officer:
Brett Cronan (Australia)

Notes:

- Fabian Holland, Du'Plessis Kirifi, Christian Lio-Willie, Ollie Norris (all New Zealand), Giorgi Beria, Tyler Duguid, Paul Mallez, Régis Montagne, Joris Segonds, Tom Spring and Jacobus van Tonder (all France) made their international debuts.

=== New Zealand vs France (second test) ===
12 July 2025
19:05 NZST (UTC+12)

New Zealand	43–17	France
Try: Roigard 14' c Savea 23' c Taylor 29' m Vaa'i 36' c Jordan 54' c Ioane 62' c Con: B. Barrett (4/5) 15', 37', 55', 63'; J. Barrett (1/1) 24'; Pen: B. Barrett (1/1) 8'	Report	Try: Barré 47' c Brennan 77' c Con: Le Garrec (1/1) 48'; Hastoy (1/1) 78'; Pen: Le Garrec (1/1) 20'

Sky Stadium, Wellington
Attendance: 33,827
Referee: Christophe Ridley (England)

FB	15	Will Jordan
RW	14	Emoni Narawa
OC	13	Billy Proctor
IC	12	Jordie Barrett		(substituted off) 27'	(substituted on) 40'	(substituted off) 65'
LW	11	Rieko Ioane
FH	10	Beauden Barrett	(yellow card) 19'	(substituted off) 63'
SH	9	Cam Roigard		(substituted off) 63'
N8	8	Christian Lio-Willie		(substituted off) 55'
OF	7	Ardie Savea (c)
BF	6	Tupou Vaa'i
RL	5	Fabian Holland
LL	4	Patrick Tuipulotu		(substituted off) 61'
TP	3	Fletcher Newell		(substituted off) 48'
HK	2	Codie Taylor		(substituted off) 55'
LP	1	Ethan de Groot		(substituted off) 48'
Substitutions:
HK	16	Samisoni Taukei'aho		(substituted on) 55'
PR	17	Ollie Norris		(substituted on) 48'
PR	18	Pasilio Tosi		(substituted on) 48'
FL	19	Samipeni Finau		(substituted on) 61'
FL	20	Du'Plessis Kirifi		(substituted on) 55'
SH	21	Cortez Ratima		(substituted on) 63'
CE	22	Timoci Tavatavanawai		(substituted on) 27'	(substituted off) 40'	(substituted on) 65'
FH	23	Damian McKenzie		(substituted on) 63'
Coach:
(New Zealand) Scott Robertson

FB	15	Léo Barré
RW	14	Théo Attissogbé
OC	13	Nicolas Depoortère
IC	12	Pierre-Louis Barassi
LW	11	Émilien Gailleton
FH	10	Joris Segonds		(substituted off) 44'
SH	9	Nolann Le Garrec		(substituted off) 72'
N8	8	Esteban Abadie		(substituted off) 44'
OF	7	Jacobus van Tonder		(substituted off) 44'
BF	6	Pierre Bochaton
RL	5	Matthias Halagahu		(substituted off) 44'
LL	4	Joshua Brennan	(yellow card) 28'
TP	3	Georges-Henri Colombe		(substituted off) 40'
HK	2	Gaëtan Barlot (c)		(substituted off) 53'
LP	1	Baptiste Erdocio		(substituted off) 44'
Substitutions:
HK	16	Pierre Bourgarit		(substituted on) 53'
PR	17	Paul Mallez		(substituted on) 44'
PR	18	Régis Montagne		(substituted on) 40'
LK	19	Romain Taofifénua		(substituted on) 44'
LK	20	Cameron Woki		(substituted on) 44'
FL	21	Bastien Vergnes-Taillefer		(substituted on) 44'
SH	22	Thibault Daubagna		(substituted on) 72'
FH	23	Antoine Hastoy		(substituted on) 44'
Coach:
(France) Fabien Galthié

Player of the Match:
Ardie Savea (New Zealand)

Assistant referees:
Nic Berry (Australia)
Takehito Namekawa (Japan)
Television match official:
Brett Cronan (Australia)
Foul play review officer:
Damon Murphy (Australia)

Notes:

- Timoci Tavatavanawai (New Zealand), Pierre Bochaton, Joshua Brennan, Thibault Daubagna, Baptiste Erdocio, Matthias Halagahu and Bastien Vergnes-Taillefer (all France) made their international debuts.
- New Zealand reclaimed the Dave Gallaher Trophy.

=== New Zealand vs France (third test) ===
19 July 2025
19:05 NZST (UTC+12)

New Zealand	29–19	France
Try: Jordan 22' c Lienert-Brown 40+3' c Kirifi 59' m McAlister 76' c Con: McKenzie (3/4) 22', 40+4', 77'; Pen: McKenzie (1/1) 31'	Report	Try: Le Garrec 8' c Con: Le Garrec (1/1) 9'; Pen: Le Garrec (3/3) 20', 34', 37'; Drop: Hastoy (1/1) 24'

Waikato Stadium, Hamilton
Attendance: 24,162
Referee: Angus Gardner (Australia)

FB	15	Ruben Love
RW	14	Will Jordan
OC	13	Anton Lienert-Brown	(substituted off) 70'
IC	12	Quinn Tupaea	(substituted off) 55'
LW	11	Sevu Reece
FH	10	Damian McKenzie
SH	9	Cortez Ratima	(substituted off) 66'
N8	8	Ardie Savea (c)
OF	7	Du'Plessis Kirifi
BF	6	Samipeni Finau	(substituted off) 66'
RL	5	Fabian Holland
LL	4	Patrick Tuipulotu
TP	3	Tyrel Lomax	(substituted off) 50'
HK	2	Samisoni Taukei'aho	(substituted off) 50'
LP	1	Ethan de Groot	(substituted off) 45'
Substitutions:
HK	16	Brodie McAlister	(substituted on) 50'
PR	17	George Bower	(substituted on) 45'
PR	18	Fletcher Newell	(substituted on) 50'
FL	19	Dalton Papali'i	(substituted on) 66'
N8	20	Christian Lio-Willie
SH	21	Noah Hotham	(substituted on) 66'
CE	22	Timoci Tavatavanawai	(substituted on) 70'
CE	23	Jordie Barrett	(substituted on) 55'
Coach:
(New Zealand) Scott Robertson

FB	15	Léo Barré	(substituted off) 60'
RW	14	Théo Attissogbé
OC	13	Nicolas Depoortère
IC	12	Gaël Fickou (c)
LW	11	Gabin Villière
FH	10	Antoine Hastoy
SH	9	Nolann Le Garrec	(substituted off) 72'
N8	8	Mickaël Guillard
OF	7	Joshua Brennan
BF	6	Alexandre Fischer	(substituted off) 40'
RL	5	Matthias Halagahu	(substituted off) 45'
LL	4	Hugo Auradou	(substituted off) 60'
TP	3	Rabah Slimani	(substituted off) 45'
HK	2	Pierre Bourgarit	(substituted off) 45'
LP	1	Baptiste Erdocio	(substituted off) 45'
Substitutions:
HK	16	Gaëtan Barlot	(substituted on) 45'
PR	17	Paul Mallez	(substituted on) 45'
PR	18	Demba Bamba	(substituted on) 45'
LK	19	Romain Taofifénua	(substituted on) 45'
FL	20	Killian Tixeront	(substituted on) 60'
FL	21	Pierre Bochaton	(substituted on) 40'
SH	22	Thibault Daubagna	(substituted on) 72'
CE	23	Émilien Gailleton	(substituted on) 60'
Coach:
(France) Fabien Galthié

Assistant referees:
Damian Schneider (Argentina)
Takehito Namekawa (Japan)
Television match official:
Brett Cronan (Australia)
Foul play review officer:
Damon Murphy (Australia)

Notes:

- Brodie McAlister (New Zealand) made his international debut.

== Squads ==
Note: Ages, caps and clubs are as per 5 July, the first test match of the tour.

=== France ===
On 24 June 2025, Fabien Galthié named France's 37-man squad for the 2025 France rugby union tour of New Zealand.

On 30 June 2025, Galthié added five Top 14 finalists who joined the France group for the New Zealand tour.

Coaching team:

- Head coach: (France) Fabien Galthié
- Backs coach: (France) Patrick Arlettaz
- Forwards coach: (France) William Servat
- Defence coach: (England) Shaun Edwards

Note: Flags indicate national union for the club/province as defined by World Rugby.

Player	Position	Date of birth (age)	Caps	Club/province
Gaëtan Barlot	Hooker	13 April 1997 (aged 28)	9	(France) Castres
Pierre Bourgarit	Hooker	12 September 1997 (aged 27)	14	(France) La Rochelle
Guillaume Marchand	Hooker	5 June 1998 (aged 27)	0	(France) Lyon
Demba Bamba	Prop	17 March 1998 (aged 27)	28	(France) Racing 92
Giorgi Beria	Prop	11 November 1999 (aged 25)	0	(France) Perpignan
Georges-Henri Colombe	Prop	9 April 1998 (aged 27)	9	(France) La Rochelle
Baptiste Erdocio	Prop	13 March 2000 (aged 25)	0	(France) Montpellier
Paul Mallez	Prop	24 January 2001 (aged 24)	0	(France) Provence
Régis Montagne	Prop	30 September 2000 (aged 24)	0	(France) Clermont
Rabah Slimani	Prop	18 October 1989 (aged 35)	57	(Ireland) Leinster
Hugo Auradou	Lock	20 July 2003 (aged 21)	5	(France) Pau
Joshua Brennan	Lock	28 November 2001 (aged 23)	0	(France) Toulouse
Tyler Duguid	Lock	17 October 2000 (aged 24)	0	(France) Montpellier
Mickaël Guillard	Lock	10 December 2000 (aged 24)	10	(France) Lyon
Matthias Halagahu	Lock	15 August 2001 (aged 23)	0	(France) Toulon
Romain Taofifénua	Lock	14 September 1990 (aged 34)	54	(France) Lyon
Cameron Woki	Lock	7 November 1998 (aged 26)	30	(France) Racing 92
Esteban Abadie	Back row	1 February 1997 (aged 28)	1	(France) Toulon
Pierre Bochaton	Back row	17 April 2001 (aged 24)	0	(France) Bordeaux Bègles
Alexandre Fischer	Back row	19 January 1998 (aged 27)	1	(France) Clermont
Killian Tixeront	Back row	22 January 2002 (aged 23)	1	(France) Clermont
Jacobus van Tonder	Back row	3 March 1998 (aged 27)	0	(France) Perpignan
Bastien Vergnes-Taillefer	Back row	13 June 1997 (aged 28)	0	(France) Bordeaux Bègles
Théo William	Back row	4 July 2000 (aged 25)	0	(France) Lyon
Thibault Daubagna	Scrum-half	20 May 1994 (aged 31)	0	(France) Pau
Baptiste Jauneau	Scrum-half	17 November 2003 (aged 21)	1	(France) Clermont
Nolann Le Garrec	Scrum-half	14 May 2002 (aged 23)	10	(France) Racing 92
Léo Berdeu	Fly-half	13 June 1998 (aged 27)	0	(France) Lyon
Antoine Hastoy	Fly-half	4 June 1997 (aged 28)	7	(France) La Rochelle
Joris Segonds	Fly-half	6 April 1997 (aged 28)	0	(France) Bayonne
Pierre-Louis Barassi	Centre	22 April 1998 (aged 27)	7	(France) Toulouse
Léon Darricarrère	Centre	4 June 2004 (aged 21)	0	(France) Clermont
Nicolas Depoortère	Centre	13 January 2003 (aged 22)	2	(France) Bordeaux Bègles
Alivereti Duguivalu	Centre	21 July 1997 (aged 27)	0	(France) Perpignan
Gaël Fickou (c)	Centre	26 March 1994 (aged 31)	94	(France) Racing 92
Émilien Gailleton	Centre	13 July 2003 (aged 21)	7	(France) Pau
Théo Millet	Centre	8 July 1997 (aged 27)	0	(France) Lyon
Théo Attissogbé	Wing	19 November 2004 (aged 20)	5	(France) Pau
Gabin Villière	Wing	13 December 1995 (aged 29)	18	(France) Toulon
Léo Barré	Fullback	20 August 2002 (aged 22)	7	(France) Stade Français
Tom Spring	Fullback	26 September 2002 (aged 22)	0	(France) Bayonne
Cheikh Tiberghien	Fullback	8 January 2000 (aged 25)	0	(France) Bayonne

=== New Zealand ===
On 23 June 2025, New Zealand named a 33-player squad for the series against France.

Christian Lio Willie and Emoni Narawa were added to the squad as injury cover for Luke Jacobson and Anton Lienert-Brown, respectively.

On 8 July, it was confirmed Scott Barrett had been ruled out with a calf tear injury sustained during the first Test in Dunedin. Ardie Savea took over the captaincy ahead of the second Test.

All squad members play rugby in New Zealand.

Coaching team:

- Head coach: (New Zealand) Scott Robertson
- Attack coach: (New Zealand) Jason Holland
- Forwards coach: (New Zealand) Jason Ryan
- Defence coach: (New Zealand) Scott Hansen

Player	Position	Date of birth (age)	Caps	Franchise/province
Brodie McAlister	Hooker	17 June 1997 (aged 28)	0	Chiefs / Canterbury
Codie Taylor	Hooker	31 March 1991 (aged 34)	96	Crusaders / Canterbury
Samisoni Taukei'aho	Hooker	8 August 1997 (aged 27)	30	Chiefs / Waikato
Ethan de Groot	Prop	22 July 1998 (aged 26)	29	Highlanders / Southland
Tyrel Lomax	Prop	16 March 1996 (aged 29)	44	Hurricanes / Tasman
Fletcher Newell	Prop	1 February 2000 (aged 25)	22	Crusaders / Canterbury
Ollie Norris	Prop	11 December 1999 (aged 25)	0	Chiefs / Waikato
Pasilio Tosi	Prop	18 July 1998 (aged 26)	7	Hurricanes / Bay of Plenty
Tamaiti Williams	Prop	10 August 2000 (aged 24)	18	Crusaders / Canterbury
Scott Barrett (c) (Note: Barrett sustained a calf tear injury in the first Test, ruling him out for the remainder of the series.)	Lock	20 November 1993 (aged 31)	80	Crusaders / Taranaki
Fabian Holland	Lock	9 October 2002 (aged 22)	0	Highlanders / Otago
Patrick Tuipulotu	Lock	23 January 1993 (aged 32)	51	Blues / Auckland
Tupou Vaa'i	Lock	27 January 2000 (aged 25)	38	Chiefs / Taranaki
Samipeni Finau	Loose forward	10 May 1999 (aged 26)	8	Chiefs / Waikato
Luke Jacobson	Loose forward	20 April 1997 (aged 28)	24	Chiefs / Waikato
Du'Plessis Kirifi	Loose forward	3 March 1997 (aged 28)	0	Hurricanes / Wellington
Christian Lio-Willie	Loose forward	26 August 1998 (aged 26)	0	Crusaders / Otago
Ardie Savea (c) (Note: Savea took over as captain from the second Test after Scott Barrett sustained an injury in the first Test.)	Loose forward	14 October 1993 (aged 31)	94	Moana Pasifika / Wellington
Wallace Sititi	Loose forward	7 September 2002 (aged 22)	10	Chiefs / North Harbour
Noah Hotham	Half-back	23 May 2003 (aged 22)	1	Crusaders / Tasman
Cortez Ratima	Half-back	22 March 2001 (aged 24)	11	Chiefs / Waikato
Cam Roigard	Half-back	16 November 2000 (aged 24)	10	Hurricanes / Counties Manukau
Beauden Barrett	First five-eighth	27 May 1991 (aged 34)	134	Blues / Taranaki
Damian McKenzie	First five-eighth	20 April 1995 (aged 30)	62	Chiefs / Waikato
Jordie Barrett	Centre	17 February 1997 (aged 28)	68	Hurricanes / Taranaki
Rieko Ioane	Centre	18 March 1997 (aged 28)	81	Blues / Auckland
Anton Lienert-Brown	Centre	15 April 1995 (aged 30)	84	Chiefs / Waikato
Billy Proctor	Centre	14 May 1999 (aged 26)	2	Hurricanes / Wellington
Timoci Tavatavanawai	Centre	14 February 1997 (aged 28)	0	Highlanders / Tasman
Quinn Tupaea	Centre	10 May 1999 (aged 26)	14	Chiefs / Waikato
Caleb Clarke	Wing	29 March 1999 (aged 26)	29	Blues / Auckland
Emoni Narawa	Wing	13 July 1999 (aged 25)	2	Chiefs / Bay of Plenty
Sevu Reece	Wing	13 February 1997 (aged 28)	32	Crusaders / Southland
Will Jordan	Fullback	24 February 1998 (aged 27)	41	Crusaders / Tasman
Ruben Love	Fullback	28 April 2001 (aged 24)	1	Hurricanes / Wellington

== Criticism ==
=== French squad availability ===
In June 2024, with news of France's next tour being publicly known, French coach Fabien Galthié told L'Équipe that he had identified a group of 20 "premium" players that he wished to rest for their tour of New Zealand. In October 2024, the French Rugby Federation (Fédération Française de Rugby; FFR), the governing body of rugby union in France, and the National Rugby League (Ligue nationale de rugby; LNR), the organisation that manages the Top 14, announced the signing of an agreement on the release of French Top 14 players for international duty from 2025 until mid-2026. In the agreement the provisions outlined stated that a foundational group of 42 players will be assembled in two phases for France's 2025 tour. Initially, 28 eligible players will be selected following the 2024–25 Top 14 play-off qualifiers (mid-June) to begin preparations for a France Development match, which will take place over the weekend of the 2024–25 Top 14 semi-finals. This cohort will subsequently be augmented by players from the clubs eliminated in the semi-finals, bringing the total to 42. Players from the 2024–25 Top 14 finalists, however, will be excluded from selection for these international periods. Thus, the top-performing French players would not be available for the French team touring New Zealand.

The announcement of the agreement and the subsequent affect it would have on the tour received a lot of attention and criticism in New Zealand and on social media. The Times journalist Will Kelleher wrote on X (formerly known as Twitter): "Interesting this, that France are taking a second team to NZ. New Zealand Rugby (NZR) officials are livid about it, as it devalues a mega series, and their ability to market it..." That same week New Zealand Rugby (NZR) announced they were surprised by the decision and asked the governing body of rugby union internationally, World Rugby, to clarify the French availability policy, citing World Rugby regulations. Former New Zealand international and Sky Sport pundit, Justin Marshall, stated: "We don't send our B team to play you at the end of the year because our players are tired. We send over our team to knock you over in your own backyard. Now, try and actually see it from our perspective that we want to have that environment." He added: "We want to have that feeling for our fans, for our people to see France with their number one team coming over here and taking us on... We treat you with respect. And I feel that if the French were to use the excuse of a long season and their players are tired, well, you know, that's just piss poor because we're exactly the same when we have to go in November, but we front."

In March 2025, French players Grégory Alldritt and Romain Ntamack expressed their desire to play for France on the tour despite the restrictive selection policy. Ntamack stated: "I don't really know yet what can be done or not, whether the finalists will be allowed to go to New Zealand. Maybe an exception will be made depending on the tour, because it's a pretty exceptional tour to go and play in New Zealand... Final or not, if we have to go, it will be with pleasure."

In June 2025, Jean-Marc Lhermet, Vice-President of the French Rugby Federation announced a new agreement that was made with the National Rugby League that relaxed some of the previous restrictions that were put on French players within the Top 14. In the new outlined conditions, French-eligible players that play for a Top 14 finalist team during the 2024–25 season would now be available for selection. However, only players that had played less than 2,000 minutes of match-time (citing World Rugby player safety guidelines) would be eligible for selection, with a maximum selection cap of five players.

In June, the five players that were selected for France from the two Top 14 finalists were Joshua Brennan, Pierre-Louis Barassi, Nicolas Depoortère, Bastien Vergnes-Taillefer, and Pierre Bochaton.

== See also ==
- 2025 mid-year rugby union tests
- 2025 British & Irish Lions tour to Australia
- 2025 England rugby union tour of Argentina and the United States
- 2025 Italy rugby union tour of Namibia and South Africa
- 2025 Wales rugby union tour of Japan
