= 2024–25 Top 14 season =

French rugby union season

2024–25 Top 14
- Countries: France
- Date: 7 September 2024 – 28 June 2025
- Champions: Toulouse (24th title)
- Runners-up: Bordeaux Bègles
- Relegated: Vannes
- Matches played: 186
- Attendance: 3,157,304 (average 16,975 per match)
- Tries scored: 1073 (average 5.8 per match)
- Top point scorer: (England) Joe Simmonds (255 points)
- Top try scorer: (France) Louis Bielle-Biarrey (13 tries)

The 2024–25 Top 14 competition was the 126th French domestic rugby union club competition operated by the Ligue Nationale de Rugby (LNR).

== Format ==
The top six teams at the end of the regular season (after all the teams played one another twice, once at home, once away) enter a knockout stage to decide the Champions of France. This consists of three rounds: the teams finishing third to sixth in the table play quarter-finals (hosted by the third and fourth placed teams). The winners then face the top two teams in the semi-finals, with the winners meeting in the final at the Stade de France in Saint-Denis. The LNR uses a slightly different bonus points system from that used in most other rugby competitions. It trialled a new system in 2007–08 explicitly designed to prevent a losing team from earning more than one bonus point in a match, a system that also made it impossible for either team to earn a bonus point in a drawn match. LNR chose to continue with this system for subsequent seasons.

France's bonus point system operates as follows:

- 4 points for a win.
- 2 points for a draw.
- 1 bonus point for winning while scoring at least 3 more tries than the opponent. This replaces the standard bonus point for scoring 4 tries regardless of the match result.
- 1 bonus point for losing by 5 points (or fewer). The margin had been 7 points until being changed prior to the 2014–15 season.

From the 2017–18 season onwards, only the 14th placed team is automatically relegated to the Pro D2. The 13th placed team play the runner-up of the Pro D2 play-off, with the winner taking up the final place in the Top 14 for the following season.

== Teams ==
2024–25 Top 14 season (France)
Locations of clubs competing in the 2024–25 Top 14.

Fourteen clubs will compete in the 2024–25 Top 14 season, 13 of them returning. Oyonnax were relegated to Pro D2 after finishing at the bottom of the table the previous season. Vannes is the sole promoted club, finishing second in the Pro D2 the previous season and winning the Pro D2 playoffs. Montpellier, who finished 13th in the previous Top 14 season, defeated Grenoble in the relegation playoffs to retain their place.

2024–25 Top 14 clubs
Club	City	Stadium	Capacity	Prev
Bayonne	Bayonne	Stade Jean Dauger	16,934	12th
Bordeaux Bègles	Bordeaux	Stade Chaban-Delmas (Note: In recent years, Bordeaux Bègles has taken occasional home matches to Matmut Atlantique.)	33,500	3rd
Castres	Castres	Stade Pierre-Fabre	12,500	7th
Clermont	Clermont-Ferrand	Stade Marcel-Michelin	19,022	8th
La Rochelle	La Rochelle	Stade Marcel-Deflandre	16,700	5th
Lyon	Lyon	Matmut Stadium de Gerland	25,000	11th
Montpellier	Montpellier	Altrad Stadium	15,697	13th
Pau	Pau	Stade du Hameau	14,588	9th
Perpignan	Perpignan	Stade Aimé Giral	14,593	10th
Racing	Nanterre	Paris La Défense Arena	30,681	6th
Stade Français	Paris	Stade Jean-Bouin	20,000	2nd
Toulon	Toulon	Stade Mayol (Note: In recent years, Toulon has taken occasional home matches to Stade Vélodrome in Marseille and Allianz Riviera in Nice.)	18,200	4th
Toulouse	Toulouse	Stade Ernest-Wallon (Note: Toulouse often takes high-demand home matches to the city's largest sporting venue, Stadium de Toulouse.)	18,754	1st
Vannes	Vannes	Stade de la Rabine	11,500	2nd (D2)

== Table ==
2024–25 Top 14 Table
Pos	Team	Pld	W	D	L	PF	PA	PD	TF	TA	TB	LB	Pts	Qualification
1	Toulouse (C)	26	18	1	7	891	462	+429	118	52	11	5	90	Qualification for playoff semi-finals and European Rugby Champions Cup
2	Bordeaux Bègles	26	17	0	9	762	609	+153	98	72	5	5	78	Qualification for playoff semi-finals and European Rugby Champions Cup
3	Toulon	26	15	0	11	680	595	+85	79	68	7	5	72	Qualification for playoff semi-final qualifiers and European Rugby Champions Cup
4	Bayonne	26	15	1	10	632	650	−18	72	76	2	4	68	Qualification for playoff semi-final qualifiers and European Rugby Champions Cup
5	Clermont	26	13	0	13	674	627	+47	85	67	6	5	63	Qualification for playoff semi-final qualifiers and European Rugby Champions Cup
6	Castres	26	13	2	11	626	658	−32	69	71	3	4	63	Qualification for playoff semi-final qualifiers and European Rugby Champions Cup
7	La Rochelle	26	13	1	12	617	635	−18	75	65	5	3	62	Qualification for European Rugby Champions Cup
8	Pau	26	13	0	13	682	719	−37	73	92	4	5	61	Qualification for European Rugby Champions Cup
9	Montpellier	26	12	0	14	623	609	+14	66	64	3	5	56	Qualification for European Rugby Challenge Cup
10	Racing 92	26	11	2	13	710	720	−10	81	83	1	7	56	Qualification for European Rugby Challenge Cup
11	Lyon	26	10	2	14	675	722	−47	77	84	2	4	50	Qualification for European Rugby Challenge Cup
12	Stade Français	26	10	0	16	597	755	−158	64	92	2	3	45	Qualification for European Rugby Challenge Cup
13	Perpignan	26	9	2	15	469	647	−178	40	72	2	2	44	Qualification for relegation play-off
14	Vannes (R)	26	7	1	18	661	891	−230	76	115	1	5	36	Relegation to Pro D2

Updated to match(es) played on 9 June 2025. Source: Top 14
(C) Champions; (R) Relegated

== Relegation play-off ==
14 June 2025
18:00

Grenoble	11–13	Perpignan
Try: Nansen 24' m Pen: Davies (2/3) 38', 74'	Report	Try: Veredamu 4' c Con: Allan (1/1) 4'; Pen: Allan (2/2) 66', 77'

Stade des Alpes
Attendance: 19,695
Referee: Thomas Charabas

Perpignan won and therefore both clubs remained in their respective leagues.

== Playoffs ==
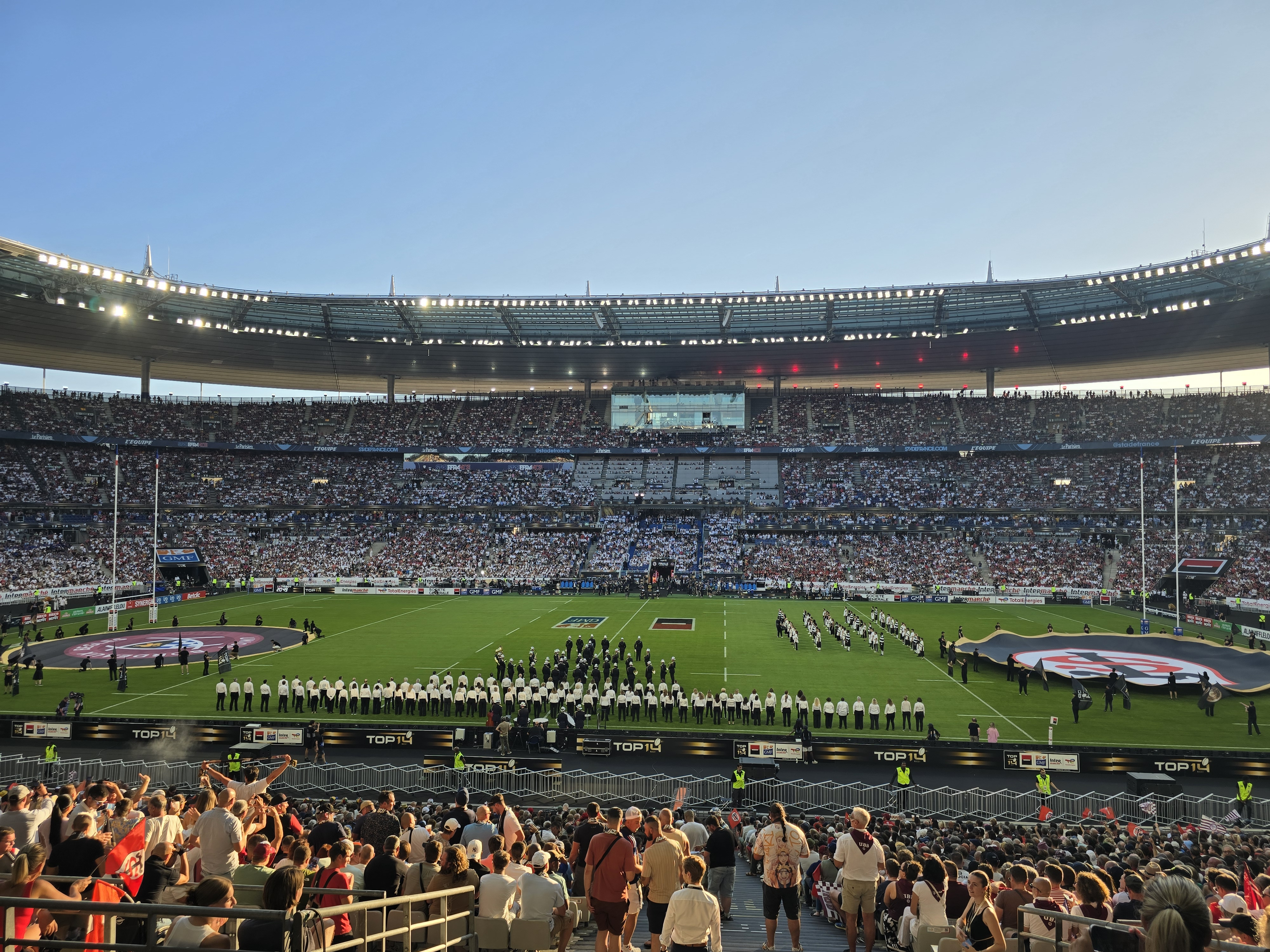
Top 14 Final between Toulouse and Bordeaux Bègles.

=== Bracket ===
Semi-final Qualifiers
4	Bayonne	20
5	Clermont	3
3	Toulon	52
6	Castres	23

Semi-finals
1	Toulouse	32
4	Bayonne	25
2	Bordeaux Bègles	39
3	Toulon	24

Final
1	Toulouse	39
2	Bordeaux Bègles	33

=== Semi-final Qualifiers ===
13 June 2025
21:05

Bayonne (4)	20–3	(5) Clermont
Try: Spring 56' m Pen: Segonds (2/3) 19', 33'; Lopez (2/3) 61', 72'; Drop: Segonds 24'	Report	Pen: Urdapilleta (1/3) 26'

Stade Jean-Dauger
Attendance: 13,507
Referee: Tual Trainini

14 June 2025
21:05

Toulon (3)	52–23	(6) Castres
Try: Jaminet 51' c Serin 56' c Isa 70' c White 72' c Nonu 78' c Wainiqolo 80' m Con: Jaminet (5/6) 51', 56', 70', 72', 78'; Pen: Jaminet (4/6) 13', 28', 37', 40'	Report	Try: Papali'i 19' c Fernandez 59' c Con: Palis (1/1) 19'; Fernandez (1/1) 59'; Pen: Palis (1/1) 35'; Fernandez (2/2) 42', 53'

Stade Mayol
Attendance: 15,364
Referee: Benoit Rousselet

=== Semi-finals ===
20 June 2025
21:05

Toulouse (1)	32–25	(4) Bayonne
Try: Ntamack 13' c Graou 32' c Con: Ramos (2/2) 13', 32'; Pen: Ramos (6/6) 8', 22', 45', 55', 70, 74'	Report	Try: Martin 80' c Con: Lopez (1/1) 80'; Pen: Segonds (6/6) 2', 10', 19', 29', 35', 51'

Parc Olympique Lyonnais, Décines-Charpieu
Attendance: 58,741
Referee: Luc Ramos

21 June 2025
21:05

Bordeaux Bègles (2)	39–24	(3) Toulon
Try: Depoortère 19' m Lamothe (3) 28' c, 46' c, 56' c Penaud 54' c Con: Jalibert (4/5) 28', 46', 54', 56'; Pen: Jalibert (2/2) 6', 65'	Report	Try: Faingaʻanuku 40' c Tuicuvu 63' c Gigashvili 80' c Con: Jaminet (1/1) 40'; Domon (2/2) 63', 80'; Pen: Jaminet (1/1) 9'

Parc Olympique Lyonnais, Décines-Charpieu
Attendance: 58,408
Referee: Ludovic Cayre

=== Final ===
28 June 2025
21:05

Toulouse (1)	39–33 (a.e.t.)	(2) Bordeaux Bègles
Try: Jelonch 31' c Willis (2) 40' c, 46' c Con: Ramos (3/3) 31', 40', 46'; Pen: Ramos (6/6) 5', 21', 56', 64', 96', 100'	Report	Try: Penaud 36' c Jalibert 43' c Petti 71' c Con: Lucu (3/3) 36', 43', 471'; Pen: Lucu (4/4) 3', 9', 27', 80'

Stade de France, Saint-Denis
Attendance: 78,534
Referee: Pierre Brousset

FB	15	(France) Thomas Ramos
RW	14	(Argentina) Juan Cruz Mallía
OC	13	(France) Pierre-Louis Barassi
IC	12	(Argentina) Santiago Chocobares
LW	11	(Scotland) Blair Kinghorn
FH	10	(France) Romain Ntamack
SH	9	(France) Paul Graou
N8	8	(France) Anthony Jelonch
OF	7	(England) Jack Willis
BF	6	(France) Francois Cros
RL	5	(France) Thibaud Flament
LL	4	(France) Joshua Brennan
TP	3	(France) Dorian Aldegheri
HK	2	(France) Julien Marchand (c)
LP	1	(France) Rodrigue Neti
Substitutions:
HK	16	(France) Guillaume Cramont
PR	17	(France) Cyril Baille
LK	18	(France) Emmanuel Meafou
N8	19	(France) Léo Banos
FL	20	(Japan) Naoto Saito
CE	21	(Tonga) Pita Ahki
WG	22	(France) Matthis Lebel
PR	23	(Spain) Joël Merkler
Coach:
(France) Ugo Mola

FB	15	(France) Romain Buros
RW	14	(France) Damian Penaud
OC	13	(France) Nicolas Depoortère
IC	12	(France) Yoram Moefana
LW	11	(France) Louis Bielle-Biarrey
FH	10	(France) Matthieu Jalibert
SH	9	(France) Maxime Lucu (c)
N8	8	(Australia) Peter Samu
OF	7	(France) Pierre Bochaton
BF	6	(France) Marko Gazzotti
RL	5	(France) Cyril Cazeaux
LL	4	(Argentina) Guido Petti
TP	3	(Tonga) Ben Tameifuna
HK	2	(France) Maxime Lamothe
LP	1	(France) Jefferson Poirot
Substitutions:
HK	16	(France) Connor Sa
PR	17	(France) Matis Perchaud
LK	18	(Scotland) Jonny Gray
FL	19	(France) Bastien Vergnes-Taillefer
FL	20	(France) Arthur Retière
FH	21	(Republic of Ireland) Joey Carbery
CE	22	(South Africa) Rohan Janse van Rensburg
PR	23	(France) Sipili Falatea
Coach:
(France) Yannick Bru

== Leading scorers ==
Note: Flags to the left of player names indicate national team as has been defined under World Rugby eligibility rules, or primary nationality for players who have not yet earned international senior caps. Players may hold one or more non-WR nationalities.

As of 11 May 2025

=== Most points ===
Rank	Player	Club	Points
1	(France) Maxime Lafage	Vannes	226
2	(England) Joe Simmonds	Pau	219
3	(France) Léo Berdeu	Lyon	192
4	(France) Nolann Le Garrec	Racing 92	191
5	(France) Thomas Ramos	Toulouse	165
6	(France) Joris Segonds	Bayonne	151
7	(France) Louis Carbonel	Stade Français	137
8	(France) Antoine Hastoy	La Rochelle	132
9	(Italy) Tommaso Allan	Perpignan	128
10	(France) Louis Le Brun	Castres	116

=== Most tries ===
Rank	Player	Club	Tries
1	(France) Gaël Dréan	Toulon	12
2	(France) Louis Bielle-Biarrey	Bordeaux Bègles	10
2	(France) Baptiste Couilloud	Lyon	10
2	(Fiji) Sireli Maqala	Bayonne	10
5	(Italy) Ange Capuozzo	Toulouse	9
5	(France) Nolann Le Garrec	Racing 92	9
5	(France) Thomas Moukoro	Vannes	9
8	(France) Sekou Macalou	Stade Français	8
9	(France) Emilien Gailleton	Pau	7
9	(Australia) Feleti Kaitu'u	Racing 92	7
9	(France) Quentin Lespiaucq	La Rochelle	7
9	(France) Damian Penaud	Bordeaux Bègles	7
9	(France) Teddy Thomas	La Rochelle	7

== Attendances ==
The top 5 clubs with the highest average home attendance in the 2024–25 Top 14 season:

#	Club	Average
1	Union Bordeaux Bègles	32,864
2	Stade toulousain	21,746
3	RC toulonnais	18,463
4	LOU Rugby	17,900
5	ASM Clermont Auvergne	17,837

== See also ==
- 2024–25 Pro D2 season
- 2024–25 Nationale season
