= 2023–24 Top 14 season =

French rugby union season

2023–24 Top 14
- Countries: France
- Date: 18 August 2023 – 28 June 2024
- Champions: Toulouse (23rd title)
- Runners-up: Bordeaux Bègles
- Relegated: Oyonnax
- Matches played: 182
- Attendance: 2,775,951 (average 15,252 per match)
- Tries scored: 1041 (average 5.7 per match)
- Top point scorer: (England) Joe Simmonds (241 points)
- Top try scorer: (France) Baptiste Couilloud (17 tries)

The 2023–24 Top 14 competition is the 125th French domestic rugby union club competition operated by the Ligue Nationale de Rugby (LNR).

== Format ==
The top six teams at the end of the regular season (after all the teams played one another twice, once at home, once away) enter a knockout stage to decide the Champions of France. This consists of three rounds: the teams finishing third to sixth in the table play quarter-finals (hosted by the third and fourth placed teams). The winners then face the top two teams in the semi-finals, with the winners meeting in the final at the Stade Vélodrome in Marseille. The LNR uses a slightly different bonus points system from that used in most other rugby competitions. It trialled a new system in 2007–08 explicitly designed to prevent a losing team from earning more than one bonus point in a match, a system that also made it impossible for either team to earn a bonus point in a drawn match. LNR chose to continue with this system for subsequent seasons.

France's bonus point system operates as follows:

- 4 points for a win.
- 2 points for a draw.
- 1 bonus point for winning while scoring at least 3 more tries than the opponent. This replaces the standard bonus point for scoring 4 tries regardless of the match result.
- 1 bonus point for losing by 5 points (or fewer). The margin had been 7 points until being changed prior to the 2014–15 season.

From the 2017–18 season onwards, only the 14th placed team is automatically relegated to the Pro D2. The 13th placed team play the runner-up of the Pro D2 play-off, with the winner taking up the final place in the Top 14 for the following season.

== Teams ==
2023–24 Top 14 season (France)
Locations of clubs competing in the 2023–24 Top 14.

Fourteen clubs competed in the 2023–24 Top 14 season, 13 of them returning. Brive were relegated to Pro D2 after finishing at the bottom of the table the previous season. Oyonnax were the sole promoted club, finishing first in the Pro D2 the previous season and winning the Pro D2 playoffs. Perpignan, who finished 13th in the previous Top 14 season, defeated Grenoble in the relegation playoffs to retain their place.

2023–24 Top 14 clubs
Club	City	Stadium	Capacity	Prev
Bayonne	Bayonne	Stade Jean Dauger	16,934	8th
Bordeaux Bègles	Bordeaux	Stade Chaban-Delmas (Note: In recent years, Bordeaux Bègles has taken occasional home matches to Matmut Atlantique.)	33,500	6th
Castres	Castres	Stade Pierre-Fabre	12,500	9th
Clermont	Clermont-Ferrand	Stade Marcel-Michelin	19,022	10th
La Rochelle	La Rochelle	Stade Marcel-Deflandre	16,700	2nd
Lyon	Lyon	Matmut Stadium de Gerland	25,000	3rd
Montpellier	Montpellier	Altrad Stadium	15,697	11th
Oyonnax	Oyonnax	Stade Charles-Mathon	11,500	1st (D2)
Pau	Pau	Stade du Hameau	14,588	12th
Perpignan	Perpignan	Stade Aimé Giral	14,593	13th
Racing	Nanterre	Paris La Défense Arena	30,681	5th
Stade Français	Paris	Stade Jean-Bouin	20,000	4th
Toulon	Toulon	Stade Mayol (Note: In recent years, Toulon has taken occasional home matches to Stade Vélodrome in Marseille and Allianz Riviera in Nice.)	18,200	7th
Toulouse	Toulouse	Stade Ernest-Wallon (Note: Toulouse often takes high-demand home matches to the city's largest sporting venue, Stadium de Toulouse.)	18,754	1st

== Table ==
2023–24 Top 14 Table
Pos	Team	Pld	W	D	L	PF	PA	PD	TF	TA	TB	LB	Pts	Qualification
1	Toulouse (C)	26	16	1	9	765	592	+173	103	72	7	3	76	Qualification for playoff semi-finals and European Rugby Champions Cup
2	Stade Français	26	17	1	8	539	511	+28	57	49	4	1	75	Qualification for playoff semi-finals and European Rugby Champions Cup
3	Bordeaux Bègles	26	15	0	11	677	558	+119	80	66	5	4	69	Qualification for playoff semi-final qualifiers and European Rugby Champions Cup
4	Toulon	26	15	0	11	704	519	+185	72	58	5	4	69	Qualification for playoff semi-final qualifiers and European Rugby Champions Cup
5	La Rochelle	26	13	1	12	595	496	+99	69	49	5	7	66	Qualification for playoff semi-final qualifiers and European Rugby Champions Cup
6	Racing 92	26	13	0	13	622	546	+76	79	56	5	5	62	Qualification for playoff semi-final qualifiers and European Rugby Champions Cup
7	Castres	26	13	0	13	643	642	+1	69	77	4	6	62	Qualification for European Rugby Champions Cup
8	Clermont	26	12	2	12	621	671	−50	74	78	6	3	61	Qualification for European Rugby Champions Cup
9	Pau	26	13	0	13	630	609	+21	68	72	3	5	60	Qualification for European Rugby Challenge Cup
10	Perpignan	26	13	0	13	634	701	−67	80	85	5	1	58	Qualification for European Rugby Challenge Cup
11	Lyon	26	12	0	14	630	754	−124	72	90	5	2	55	Qualification for European Rugby Challenge Cup
12	Bayonne	26	11	0	15	572	669	−97	65	77	2	6	52	Qualification for European Rugby Challenge Cup
13	Montpellier	26	9	0	17	542	655	−113	61	79	1	7	44	Qualification for relegation play-off
14	Oyonnax (R)	26	7	1	18	539	790	−251	58	99	0	4	34	Relegation to Pro D2

Updated to match(es) played on 18 May 2024. Source: Top 14
(C) Champions; (R) Relegated

== Regular season ==
Regular season

=== Round 1 ===
18 August 2023
21:05

Bayonne	26–7	Toulouse
	Report

Stade Jean Dauger

19 August 2023
14:00

Racing 92	23–18	Bordeaux Bègles (1 BP)
	Report

Paris La Défense Arena

19 August 2023
18:10

Perpignan	7–29	Stade Français (1 BP)
	Report

Stade Aimé Giral

19 August 2023
18:10

Oyonnax	36–17	Clermont
	Report

Stade Charles-Mathon

19 August 2023
18:10

Castres	24–23	Pau (1 BP)
	Report

Stade Pierre-Fabre

19 August 2023
18:10

(1 BP) Lyon	27–15	Toulon
	Report

Stade de Gerland

20 August 2023
21:05

Montpellier	26–15	La Rochelle
	Report

GGL Stadium

=== Round 2 ===
25 August 2023
21:05

Stade Français	28–18	Oyonnax
	Report

Stade Jean-Bouin

26 August 2023
14:00

La Rochelle	35–14	Lyon
	Report

Stade Marcel-Deflandre

26 August 2023
18:10

Bordeaux Bègles	25–23	Castres (1 BP)
	Report

Stade Chaban-Delmas

26 August 2023
18:10

(1 BP) Clermont	38–14	Perpignan
	Report

Stade Marcel-Michelin

26 August 2023
18:10

Pau	19–17	Racing 92 (1 BP)
	Report

Stade du Hameau

26 August 2023
18:10

Toulon	19–14	Bayonne (1 BP)
	Report

Stade Mayol

27 August 2023
21:05

(1 BP) Toulouse	38–13	Montpellier
	Report

Stade Ernest-Wallon

=== Round 3 ===
2 September 2023
15:00

Oyonnax	21–27	Toulouse
	Report

Stade Charles-Mathon

2 September 2023
17:00

(1 BP) Castres	37–0	Bayonne
	Report

Stade Pierre-Fabre

2 September 2023
17:00

(1 BP) Stade Français	24–9	Montpellier
	Report

Stade Jean-Bouin

2 September 2023
17:00

(1 BP) Pau	40–10	Lyon
	Report

Stade du Hameau

2 September 2023
17:00

(1 BP) Racing 92	59–10	Perpignan
	Report

Paris La Défense Arena

2 September 2023
21:05

Clermont	11–10	La Rochelle (1 BP)
	Report

Stade Marcel-Michelin

3 September 2023
21:05

Bordeaux Bègles	22–17	Toulon (1 BP)
	Report

Stade Chaban-Delmas

=== Round 4 ===
29 October 2023
14:00

Bayonne	16–3	Stade Français
	Report

Stade Jean-Dauger

29 October 2023
16:05

Perpignan	24–39	Pau
	Report

Stade Aimé Giral

29 October 2023
16:05

(1 BP) Lyon	41–22	Clermont
	Report

Stade de Gerland

29 October 2023
16:05

(1 BP) Montpellier	16–19	Racing 92
	Report

GGL Stadium

29 October 2023
16:05

(1 BP) Toulon	41–7	Oyonnax
	Report

Stade Mayol

29 October 2023
18:10

(1 BP) La Rochelle	24–27	Castres
	Report

Stade Marcel-Deflandre

29 October 2023
21:05

Toulouse	29–22	Bordeaux Bègles
	Report

Stade Ernest-Wallon

=== Round 5 ===
4 November 2023
15:00

Oyonnax	19–17	La Rochelle (1 BP)
	Report

Stade Charles-Mathon

4 November 2023
17:00

Perpignan	26–22	Toulon (1 BP)
	Report

Stade Aimé Giral

4 November 2023
17:00

Bordeaux Bègles	26–13	Montpellier
	Report

Stade Chaban-Delmas

4 November 2023
17:00

(1 BP) Clermont	46–14	Bayonne
	Report

Stade Marcel-Michelin

4 November 2023
17:00

(1 BP) Stade Français	39–16	Castres
	Report

Stade Jean-Bouin

4 November 2023
21:05

Racing 92	22–20	Lyon (1 BP)
	Report

Paris La Défense Arena

5 November 2023
21:05

Pau	13–9	Toulouse (1 BP)
	Report

Stade du Hameau

=== Round 6 ===
11 November 2023
14:00

Toulouse	43–34	Perpignan
	Report

Stade Ernest-Wallon

11 November 2023
16:00

Pau	20–11	Bordeaux Bègles
	Report

Stade du Hameau

11 November 2023
16:00

(1 BP) Montpellier	17–20	Clermont
	Report

GGL Stadium

11 November 2023
16:00

(1 BP) Lyon	32–36	Stade Français
	Report

Stade de Gerland

11 November 2023
16:00

(1 BP) Castres	39–11	Oyonnax
	Report

Stade Pierre-Fabre

11 November 2023
20:05

La Rochelle	18–15	Bayonne (1 BP)
	Report

Stade Marcel-Deflandre

12 November 2023
20:05

Toulon	31–26	Racing 92 (1 BP)
	Report

Stade Mayol

=== Round 7 ===
18 November 2023
14:00

(1 BP) Stade Français	9–13	Racing 92
	Report

Stade Jean-Bouin

18 November 2023
16:00

Perpignan	23–16	Montpellier
	Report

Stade Aimé Giral

18 November 2023
16:00

Oyonnax	38–20	Lyon
	Report

Stade Charles-Mathon

18 November 2023
16:00

(1 BP) Clermont	27–30	Toulon
	Report

Stade Marcel-Michelin

18 November 2023
16:00

(1 BP) Bayonne	35–16	Pau
	Report

Stade Jean-Dauger

18 November 2023
20:05

Castres	31–23	Toulouse
	Report

Stade Pierre-Fabre

19 November 2023
20:05

La Rochelle	25–21	Bordeaux Bègles (1 BP)
	Report

Stade Marcel-Deflandre

=== Round 8 ===
25 November 2023
15:00

Toulon	41–19	Castres
	Report

Stade Mayol

25 November 2023
17:00

(1 BP) Bordeaux Bègles	46–22	Perpignan
	Report

Stade Chaban-Delmas

25 November 2023
17:00

Lyon	42–29	Bayonne
	Report

Stade de Gerland

25 November 2023
17:00

(1 BP) Montpellier	21–26	Oyonnax
	Report

GGL Stadium

25 November 2023
17:00

(1 BP) Pau	30–6	Stade Français
	Report

Stade du Hameau

25 November 2023
21:05

(1 BP) Toulouse	31–10	Clermont
	Report

Stade Ernest-Wallon

26 November 2023
21:05

(1 BP) Racing 92	32–10	La Rochelle
	Report

Paris La Défense Arena

=== Round 9 ===
2 December 2023
15:00

(1 BP) Toulon	36–13	Pau
	Report

Stade Mayol

2 December 2023
17:00

Bayonne	34–19	Montpellier
	Report

Stade Jean Dauger

2 December 2023
17:00

Oyonnax	23–29	Bordeaux Bègles
	Report

Stade Charles-Mathon

2 December 2023
17:00

(1 BP) Castres	29–14	Lyon
	Report

Stade Pierre-Fabre

2 December 2023
17:00

(1 BP) La Rochelle	35–6	Perpignan
	Report

Stade Marcel-Deflandre

2 December 2023
21:05

Clermont	23–18	Racing 92 (1 BP)
	Report

Stade Marcel-Michelin

3 December 2023
21:05

Stade Français	27–12	Toulouse
	Report

Stade Jean-Bouin

=== Round 10 ===
22 December 2023
19:00

(1 BP) Perpignan	36–10	Bayonne
	Report

Stade Aimé Giral

22 December 2023
21:00

(1 BP) Bordeaux Bègles	46–10	Lyon
	Report

Stade Chaban-Delmas

23 December 2023
14:00

Montpellier	30–21	Castres
	Report

GGL Stadium

23 December 2023
14:00

(1 BP) Racing 92	66–10	Oyonnax
	Report

Paris La Défense Arena

23 December 2023
16:00

Pau	22–11	Clermont
	Report

Stade du Hameau

23 December 2023
18:00

Stade Français	18–13	La Rochelle (1 BP)
	Report

Stade Jean-Bouin

23 December 2023
21:05

Toulouse	25–17	Toulon
	Report

Stadium de Toulouse

=== Round 11 ===
29 December 2023
19:00

Oyonnax	34–13	Pau
	Report

Stade Charles-Mathon

29 December 2023
21:00

(1 BP) Clermont	35–40	Bordeaux Bègles
	Report

Stade Marcel-Michelin

30 December 2023
14:00

Lyon	20–18	Montpellier (1 BP)
	Report

Stade de Gerland

30 December 2023
16:00

Bayonne	27–23	Racing 92 (1 BP)
	Report

Stade Jean-Dauger

30 December 2023
18:00

Toulon	19–5	Stade Français
	Report

Stade Mayol

30 December 2023
21:05

(1 BP) La Rochelle	29–8	Toulouse
	Report

Stade Marcel-Deflandre

31 December 2023
14:00

(1 BP) Castres	13–17	Perpignan
	Report

Stade Pierre-Fabre

=== Round 12 ===
6 January 2024
15:00

Pau	20–29	La Rochelle
	Report

Stade du Hameau

6 January 2024
17:00

Perpignan	27–12	Oyonnax
	Report

Stade Aimé Giral

6 January 2024
17:00

Bordeaux Bègles	24–23	Bayonne (1 BP)
	Report

Stade Chaban-Delmas

6 January 2024
17:00

Stade Français	14–14	Clermont
	Report

Stade Jean-Bouin

6 January 2024
17:00

(1 BP) Racing 92	34–30	Castres (1 BP)
	Report

Paris La Défense Arena

6 January 2024
21:05

(1 BP) Toulouse	45–0	Lyon
	Report

Stade Ernest-Wallon

7 January 2024
21:05

Montpellier	27–17	Toulon
	Report

GGL Stadium

=== Round 13 ===
27 January 2024
15:05

(1 BP) Bordeaux Bègles	26–30	Stade Français
	Report

Stade Chaban-Delmas

27 January 2024
17:00

Bayonne	21–17	Oyonnax (1 BP)
	Report

Stade Jean-Dauger

27 January 2024
17:00

(1 BP) Castres	20–23	Clermont
	Report

Stade Pierre-Fabre

27 January 2024
17:00

Lyon	36–24	Perpignan
	Report

Stade de Gerland

27 January 2024
17:00

Montpellier	22–17	Pau (1 BP)
	Report

GGL Stadium

27 January 2024
21:05

Toulon	25–23	La Rochelle (1 BP)
	Report

Stade Mayol

28 January 2024
21:05

Racing 92	20–27	Toulouse
	Report

Paris La Défense Arena

=== Round 14 ===
3 February 2024
15:00

(1 BP) Perpignan	26–5	Racing 92
	Report

Stade Aimé Giral

3 February 2024
17:00

(1 BP) Oyonnax	19–23	Stade Français
	Report

Stade Charles-Mathon

3 February 2024
17:00

(1 BP) Clermont	38–21	Lyon
	Report

Stade Marcel-Michelin

3 February 2024
17:00

La Rochelle	18–10	Montpellier
	Report

Stade Marcel-Deflandre

3 February 2024
17:00

Pau	33–44	Castres
	Report

Stade du Hameau

3 February 2024
21:05

(1 BP) Toulouse	46–26	Bayonne
	Report

Stade Ernest-Wallon

4 February 2024
21:05

(1 BP) Toulon	32–37	Bordeaux Bègles
	Report

Stade Mayol

=== Round 15 ===
17 February 2024
15:00

Lyon	28–17	La Rochelle
	Report

Stade de Gerland

17 February 2024
17:00

Bordeaux Bègles	10–20	Pau
	Report

Stade Chaban-Delmas

17 February 2024
17:00

(1 BP) Stade Français	32–19	Perpignan
	Report

Stade Jean-Bouin

17 February 2024
17:00

Racing 92	20–44	Montpellier (1 BP)
	Report

Paris La Défense Arena

17 February 2024
17:00

(1 BP) Toulouse	61–34	Oyonnax
	Report

Stade Ernest-Wallon

17 February 2024
21:05

Bayonne	21–13	Clermont
	Report

Stade Jean-Dauger

18 February 2024
21:05

Castres	25–17	Clermont
	Report

Stade Pierre-Fabre

=== Round 16 ===
24 February 2024
15:00

Montpellier	28–23	Bayonne (1 BP)
	Report

GGL Stadium

24 February 2024
17:00

(1 BP) Perpignan	27–15	La Rochelle
	Report

Stade Aimé Giral

24 February 2024
17:00

(1 BP) Castres	41–12	Bordeaux Bègles
	Report

Stade Pierre-Fabre

24 February 2024
17:00

(1 BP) Lyon	43–26	Oyonnax
	Report

Stade de Gerland

24 February 2024
17:00

Pau	17–9	Toulon
	Report

Stade du Hameau

24 February 2024
21:05

Racing 92	11–27	Stade Français
	Report

Paris La Défense Arena

25 February 2024
21:05

(1 BP) Clermont	33–37	Toulouse
	Report

Stade Marcel-Michelin

=== Round 17 ===
2 March 2024
15:00

(1 BP) Toulouse	33–6	Castres
	Report

Stade Ernest-Wallon

2 March 2024
17:00

(1 BP) Bayonne	39–10	Lyon
	Report

Stade Jean-Dauger

2 March 2024
17:00

(1 BP) Oyonnax	35–39	Montpellier
	Report

Stade Charles-Mathon

2 March 2024
17:00

(1 BP) Stade Français	25–12	Pau
	Report

Stade Jean-Bouin

2 March 2024
17:00

Toulon	44–22	Perpignan
	Report

Stade Mayol

2 March 2024
21:05

Bordeaux Bègles	21–5	Racing 92
	Report

Stade Chaban-Delmas

3 March 2024
21:05

(1 BP) La Rochelle	42–3	Clermont
	Report

Stade Marcel-Deflandre

=== Round 18 ===
9 March 2024
15:00

(1 BP) La Rochelle	23–3	Stade Français
	Report

Stade Marcel-Deflandre

9 March 2024
17:00

Clermont	15–15	Oyonnax
	Report

Stade Marcel-Michelin

9 March 2024
17:00

(1 BP) Lyon	34–19	Castres
	Report

Stade de Gerland

9 March 2024
17:00

Montpellier	10–3	Bordeaux Bègles
	Report

GGL Stadium

9 March 2024
17:00

Pau	42–40	Bayonne (1 BP)
	Report

Stade du Hameau

9 March 2024
21:05

Perpignan	27–17	Toulouse
	Report

Stade Aimé Giral

10 March 2024
21:05

Racing 92	20–6	Toulon
	Report

Paris La Défense Arena

=== Round 19 ===
23 March 2024
15:00

(1 BP) Toulon	54–7	Montpellier
	Report

Stade Mayol

23 March 2024
17:00

(1 BP) Oyonnax	14–15	Perpignan
	Report

Stade Charles-Mathon

23 March 2024
17:00

(1 BP) Castres	21–23	Racing 92
	Report

Stade Pierre-Fabre

23 March 2024
17:00

Clermont	31–28	Pau (1 BP)
	Report

Stade Marcel-Michelin

23 March 2024
17:00

Stade Français	22–13	Lyon
	Report

Stade Jean-Bouin

23 March 2024
21:05

Bayonne	13–12	La Rochelle (1 BP)
	Report

Stade Jean-Dauger

24 March 2024
21:05

Bordeaux Bègles	31–28	Toulouse (1 BP)
	Report

Nouveau Stade de Bordeaux

=== Round 20 ===
30 March 2024
15:00

(1 BP) Montpellier	10–12	Stade Français
	Report

GGL Stadium

30 March 2024
17:00

(1 BP) Perpignan	43–12	Castres
	Report

Stade Aimé Giral

30 March 2024
17:00

(1 BP) La Rochelle	40–21	Oyonnax
	Report

Stade Marcel-Deflandre

30 March 2024
17:00

Lyon	27–10	Bordeaux Bègles
	Report

Stade de Gerland

30 March 2024
17:00

Racing 92	26–10	Clermont
	Report

Paris La Défense Arena

30 March 2024
21:05

Toulouse	31–29	Pau (1 BP)
	Report

Stade Ernest-Wallon

31 March 2024
21:05

Bayonne	10–46	Toulon (1 BP)
	Report

Anoeta Stadium

=== Round 21 ===
20 April 2024
15:00

Castres	25–24	La Rochelle (1 BP)
	Report

Stade Pierre-Fabre

20 April 2024
17:00

(1 BP) Perpignan	51–20	Lyon
	Report

Stade Aimé Giral

20 April 2024
17:00

Oyonnax	13–43	Racing 92 (1 BP)
	Report

Stade Charles-Mathon

20 April 2024
17:00

Stade Français	28–24	Bayonne (1 BP)
	Report

Stade Jean-Bouin

20 April 2024
17:00

Pau	31–23	Montpellier
	Report

Stade du Hameau

20 April 2024
21:05

Toulon	20–19	Toulouse (1 BP)
	Report

Stade Vélodrome

21 April 2024
21:05

(1 BP) Bordeaux Bègles	41–7	Clermont
	Report

Stade Chaban-Delmas

=== Round 22 ===
27 April 2024
15:00

Toulouse	32–12	Racing 92
	Report

Stade Ernest-Wallon

27 April 2024
17:00

Bayonne	15–34	Bordeaux Bègles
	Report

Stade Jean-Dauger

27 April 2024
17:00

Oyonnax	22–19	Castres (1 BP)
	Report

Stade Charles-Mathon

27 April 2024
17:00

Lyon (1 BP)	38–20	Pau
	Report

Stade de Gerland

27 April 2024
17:00

Montpellier (1 BP)	20–25	Perpignan
	Report

GGL Stadium

27 April 2024
21:05

Clermont (1 BP)	41–18	Stade Français
	Report

Stade Marcel-Michelin

28 April 2024
21:05

La Rochelle	27–17	Toulon
	Report

Stade Marcel-Deflandre

=== Round 23 ===
11 May 2024
15:00

Perpignan	28–35	Clermont
	Report

Stade Aimé Giral

11 May 2024
17:00

Castres	27–26	Montpellier (1 BP)
	Report

Stade Pierre-Fabre

11 May 2024
17:00

Pau (1 BP)	39–17	Oyonnax
	Report

Stade du Hameau

11 May 2024
17:00

Racing 92	28—37	Bayonne
	Report

Paris La Défense Arena

11 May 2024
17:00

Toulon	30–24	Lyon
	Report

Stade Vélodrome

11 May 2024
21:05

Bordeaux Bègles (1 BP)	34–14	La Rochelle
	Report

Stade Chaban-Delmas

12 May 2024
21:05

Toulouse (1 BP)	49–18	Stade Français
	Report

Stade Ernest-Wallon

=== Round 24 ===
18 May 2024
17:00

Bayonne	23–20	Perpignan (1 BP)
	Report

Stade Jean-Dauger

18 May 2024
17:00

Oyonnax	17–27	Toulon
	Report

Stade Charles-Mathon

18 May 2024
17:00

Clermont (1 BP)	36—20	Castres
	Report

Stade Marcel-Michelin

18 May 2024
21:05

La Rochelle	25–23	Pau (1 BP)
	Report

Stade Marcel-Deflandre

18 May 2024
17:00

Lyon	20–14	Racing 92
	Report

Stade de Gerland

18 May 2024
15:00

Montpellier	22–29	Toulouse
	Report

GGL Stadium

19 May 2024
21:05

Stade Français	22–18	Bordeaux Bègles (1 BP)
	Report

Stade Jean-Bouin

=== Round 25 ===
1 June 2024
TBD

Perpignan	37-30	Bordeaux Bègles
	Report

TBD

1 June 2024
TBD

Oyonnax	27-20	Bayonne
	Report

TBD

1 June 2024
TBD

Castres	27-18	Stade Français
	Report

TBD

1 June 2024
TBD

Montpellier	41-26	Lyon
	Report

TBD

1 June 2024
TBD

Racing 92	24-15	Pau
	Report

TBD

1 June 2024
TBD

Toulon	52-10	Clermont
	Report

TBD

1 June 2024
TBD

Toulouse	31-31	La Rochelle
	Report

TBD

=== Round 26 ===
8 June 2024
21:05

Bayonne	17-28	Castres
	Report

TBD

8 June 2024
21:05

Bordeaux Bègles	40-7	Oyonnax
	Report

TBD

8 June 2024
21:05

Clermont	52-15	Montpellier
	Report

TBD

8 June 2024
21:05

La Rochelle	24-19	Racing 92
	Report

TBD

8 June 2024
21:05

Lyon	40-28	Toulouse
	Report

TBD

8 June 2024
21:05

Stade Français	23-20	Toulon
	Report

TBD

8 June 2024
21:05

Pau	36-24	Perpignan
	Report

TBD

== Relegation play-off ==
16 June 2024
18:00

Grenoble	18–20	Montpellier
Try: Massa 30' c Hepetema 40' m Con: Davies (1/2) 30'; Pen: Davies (2/2) 10', 19'	Report	Try: Lam 8' c N'Gandebe 15' c Con: Carbonel (2/2) 8', 15'; Pen: Carbonel (2/2) 63', 77'

Stade des Alpes
Attendance: 19,714
Referee: Tual Trainini

Montpellier won and therefore both clubs remained in their respective leagues.

== Playoffs ==
=== Bracket ===
Semi-final Qualifiers
4	Toulon	29
5	La Rochelle	34
3	Bordeaux Bègles	31
6	Racing 92	17

Semi-finals
1	Toulouse	39
5	La Rochelle	23
2	Stade Français	20
3	Bordeaux Bègles	22

Final
1	Toulouse	59
3	Bordeaux Bègles	3

=== Semi-final Qualifiers ===
15 June 2024
21:05

Toulon (4)	29–34	(5) La Rochelle
Try: Penalty try 71'; Singleton 80' c Con: Jaminet (1/1) 80'; Pen: Jaminet (5/5) 5', 13', 18', 24', 34'	Report	Try: Hastoy 10' c Leyds 31' c Favre 40' c Jegou 47' c Con: Hastoy (4/4) 10', 31', 40', 47'; Pen: Hastoy (2/2) 27', 44'

Stade Mayol
Attendance: 18,200
Referee: Luc Ramos

16 June 2024
21:05

Bordeaux Bègles (3)	31–17	(6) Racing 92
Try: Tambwe 19' m Lamothe 40' c Buros 54' c Con: Lucu (2/3) 40', 54'; Pen: Lucu (4/4) 5', 13', 30', 47'	Report	Try: Spring 67' m Con: Tedder (0/1); Pen: Tedder (4/4) 3', 17', 24', 36'

Stade Chaban-Delmas
Attendance: 34,462
Referee: Thomas Charabas

=== Semi-finals ===
21 June 2024
20:15

Toulouse (1)	39–23	(5) La Rochelle
Try: Kinghorn 22' c Mallía (2) 31', 48' c Chocobares 52' c Lebel 80' c Con: Ramos (4/5) 22', 49', 52', 80'; Pen: Ramos (2) 2', 72'	Report	Try: Latu 11' c Alldritt 38' c Con: Hastoy (2/2) 11', 38'; Pen: Hastoy (3) 19', 35', 63'

Matmut Atlantique
Attendance: 41,835
Referee: Tual Trainini

22 June 2024
21:05

Stade Français (2)	20–22	(3) Bordeaux Bègles
Try: Briatte 31' c Leyresblanques (2) 62', 80'; Con: Segonds (1/3) 31'; Pen: Segonds (1) 5'	Report	Try: Lamothe (2) 17' c, 22' c Bochaton 55'; Con: Lucu (2/3) 17', 22'; Pen: Lucu (1) 11'

Matmut Atlantique
Attendance: 41,843
Referee: Pierre Brousset

=== Final ===
28 June 2024
21:05

Toulouse (1)	59–3	(3) Bordeaux Bègles
Try: Dupont (2) 6' c, 23' c Mauvaka 19' m Ramos (2) 63' m, 73' m Marchand 67' m Kinghorn 69' m Ainuʻu 79' c Capuozzo 80' m Con: Ramos (2/6) 6', 23'; Kinghorn (1/3) 79'; Pen: Ramos (2/2) 13', 43'	Report	Pen: Lucu (1/1) 10'

Orange Vélodrome, Marseille
Attendance: 66,760
Referee: Ludovic Cayre

FB	15	(France) Thomas Ramos
RW	14	(Argentina) Juan Cruz Mallía
OC	13	(Argentina) Santiago Chocobares
IC	12	(Tonga) Pita Ahki
LW	11	(Scotland) Blair Kinghorn
FH	10	(France) Romain Ntamack
SH	9	(France) Antoine Dupont (c)
N8	8	(France) Alexandre Roumat
OF	7	(England) Jack Willis
BF	6	(France) Francois Cros
RL	5	(France) Thibaud Flament
LL	4	(Australia) Richie Arnold
TP	3	(France) Dorian Aldegheri
HK	2	(France) Peato Mauvaka
LP	1	(France) Rodrigue Neti
Substitutions:
HK	16	(France) Julien Marchand
PR	17	(United States) David Ainuʻu
LK	18	(France) Clément Vergé
N8	19	(France) Joshua Brennan
FL	20	(France) Paul Graou
CE	21	(Italy) Ange Capuozzo
WG	22	(France) Paul Costes
PR	23	(Spain) Joël Merkler
Coach:
(France) Ugo Mola

FB	15	(France) Romain Buros
RW	14	(France) Damian Penaud
OC	13	(France) Nicolas Depoortère
IC	12	(France) Yoram Moefana
LW	11	(France) Louis Bielle-Biarrey
FH	10	(France) Matthieu Jalibert
SH	9	(France) Maxime Lucu (c)
N8	8	(Japan) Tevita Tatafu
OF	7	(France) Mahamadou Diaby
BF	6	(France) Bastien Vergnes-Taillefer
RL	5	(Tonga) Adam Coleman
LL	4	(France) Cyril Cazeaux
TP	3	(Tonga) Ben Tameifuna
HK	2	(France) Maxime Lamothe
LP	1	(France) Jefferson Poirot
Substitutions:
HK	16	(France) Clément Maynadier
PR	17	(France) Ugo Boniface
LK	18	(Australia) Kane Douglas
FL	19	(France) Pierre Bochaton
FL	20	(Australia) Pete Samu
FH	21	(France) Paul Abadie
CE	22	(France) Pablo Uberti
PR	23	(Tonga) Toma'akino Taufa
Coach:
(France) Yannick Bru

== Leading scorers ==
=== Most tries ===
Rank	Player	Club	Tries
1	(France) Baptiste Couilloud	Lyon	17
2	(France) Damian Penaud	Bordeaux Bègles	14
3	(France) Tavite Veredamu	Perpignan	12
4	(Argentina) Bautista Delguy	Clermont	11
5	(France) Matthis Lebel	Toulouse	10
5	(France) Alivereti Raka	Clermont	10

== Attendances ==
Club	Home Games	Total	Average
Bayonne	13	193,120	14,855
Bordeaux Bègles	13	361,677	27,821
Castres	13	130,668	10,051
Clermont	13	217,673	16,744
La Rochelle	13	217,461	16,728
Lyon	13	230,226	17,710
Montpellier	13	140,658	10,820
Oyonnax	13	119,029	9,156
Pau	13	164,379	12,645
Perpignan	13	175,927	13,533
Racing	13	154,100	11,854
Stade Français	13	180,605	13,893
Toulon	13	222,293	17,099
Toulouse	13	268,135	20,626

== See also ==
- List of 2023–24 Top 14 transfers
- 2023–24 Rugby Pro D2 season
