= Paul Mallez =

French rugby union player

- Born: 24 January 2001 (age 25) Chalon-sur-Saône, France
- Height: 180 cm (5 ft 11 in)
- Weight: 120 kg (265 lb; 18 st 13 lb)

Rugby union career
- Position: Prop
- Current team: Toulouse
Senior career
Years	Team	Apps	(Points)
2021–	Toulouse	23	(0)
2023–	→ Provence	45	(15)
- Correct as of 14 December 2025
International career
Years	Team	Apps	(Points)
2019–2021	France U20	11	(5)
2025–	France	3	(0)
- Correct as of 14 December 2025

Paul Mallez (born 24 January 2001) is a French rugby union player, who plays for Toulouse. His preferred position is prop.

== Early career ==
Mallez is from Chalon-sur-Saône and began playing rugby aged eight at Pont-à-Mousson. He joined the Toulouse academy in 2019, winning the Espoirs title in 2021. He represented the France U20 side in 2019, 2022 and 2021.

== Professional career ==
Mallez made his professional debut for Toulouse during the 2020–21 Top 14 season against Bayonne. Over the next two seasons, he would make a small number of appearances, third choice in the pecking order. He joined Provence on loan to gain further experience ahead of the 2022/23 season. After a number of strong appearances, he extended his loan for the 2024/25 season.

Mallez was called into the France for the 2025 mid-year rugby union tests. He appeared in the French XV side against England XV before the tour. He then made his debut for the side against New Zealand in the opening test of the 2025 France rugby union tour of New Zealand.
