= Jacobus van Tonder =

French rugby union player

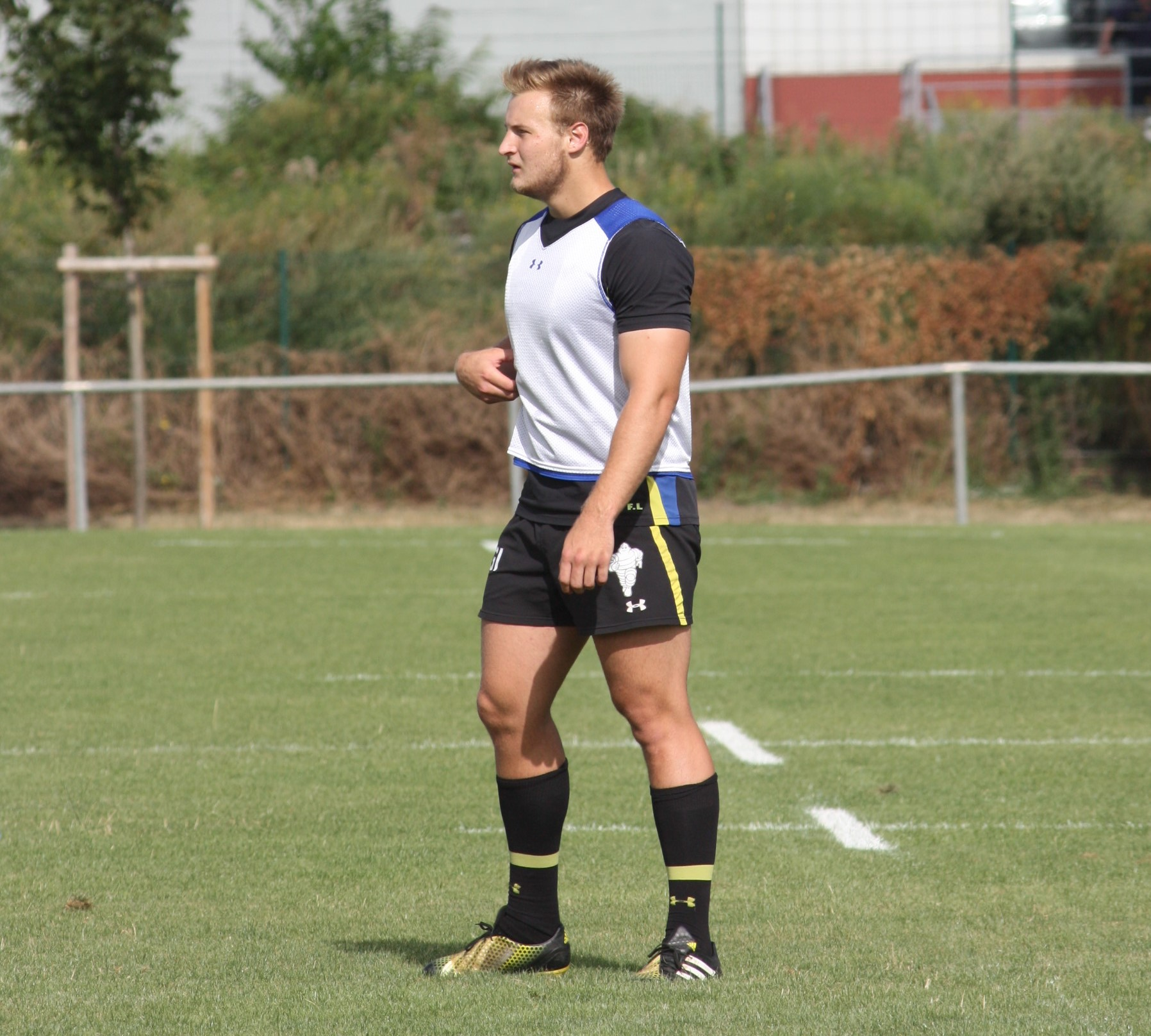
- Born: 3 March 1998 (age 28) Bloemfontein, South Africa
- Height: 197 cm (6 ft 6 in)
- Weight: 118 kg (260 lb; 18 st 8 lb)

Rugby union career
- Position: Lock / Flanker
- Current team: Perpignan
Senior career
Years	Team	Apps	(Points)
2018–2023	Clermont	56	(30)
2023–	Perpignan	35	(25)
- Correct as of 14 December 2025
International career
Years	Team	Apps	(Points)
2025–	France	2	(0)
- Correct as of 14 December 2025

Jacobus van Tonder (born 3 March 1998) is a South African-born French rugby union player, who plays for Perpignan. His preferred position is lock or flanker.

== Early career ==
Van Tonder was born in Bloemfontein and attended Grey College, Bloemfontein while also representing the Cheetahs academy. He represented the South African Schools team in 2016. In 2016, he moved to France to join up with the Clermont academy.

== Professional career ==
Van Tonder made his debut for Clermont in April 2018 against Bordeaux. He would spend five seasons with Clermont, often struggling with injury, before signing for Perpignan having been granted release by Clermont.

Van Tonder was called into the France for the 2025 mid-year rugby union tests. He appeared in the French XV side against England XV before the tour. He then made his debut for the side against New Zealand in the opening test of the 2025 France rugby union tour of New Zealand.
