= Rodrigue Neti =

France international rugby union player

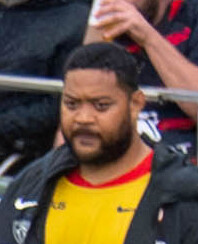
- Born: Rodrigue Neti; 28 April 1995 (age 31) Nouméa, New Caledonia
- Height: 1.85 m (6 ft 1 in)
- Weight: 124 kg (19 st 7 lb; 273 lb)

Rugby union career
- Position: Prop
- Current team: Toulouse
Amateur team(s)
| Years | Team | Apps | (Points) |
- URC Dumbéa
| 2011–2014 | Toulouse | | |
Senior career
| Years | Team | Apps | (Points) |
| 2014– | Toulouse | 199 | (10) |
- Correct as of 15 November 2025
International career
| Years | Team | Apps | (Points) |
| 2015 | France U20 | 3 | (0) |
| 2020– | France | 9 | (0) |
- Correct as of 14 March 2026

Rodrigue Neti (born 28 April 1995) is a French rugby union player. His position is in the prop and he currently plays for Toulouse in the Top 14.

== Honours ==
Toulouse

- 2× European Rugby Champions Cup: 2021, 2024
- 5× Top 14: 2019, 2021, 2023, 2024, 2025

France

- 1x Six Nations Championship: 2026
