= Paul Graou =

French rugby union player (born 1997)

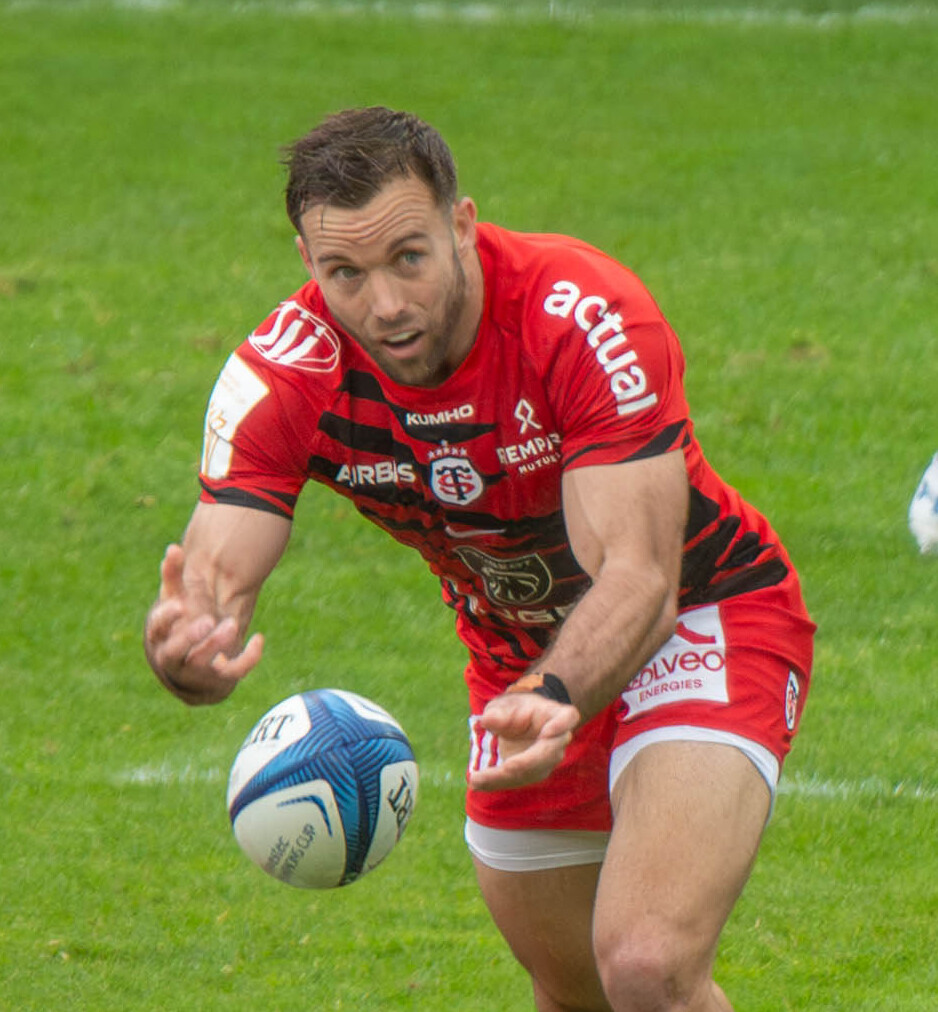
- Graou in 2025
- Born: Paul Graou; 25 July 1997 (age 29) Auch, France
- Height: 1.77 m (5 ft 9 1/2 in)
- Weight: 88 kg (13 st 12 lb; 194 lb)

Rugby union career
- Position: Scrum-half
- Current team: Toulouse
Youth career
- 2001–2017: Auch
Senior career
Years	Team	Apps	(Points)
2017–2021	Montauban	42	(25)
2021–2022	Agen	25	(64)
2022–	Toulouse	86	(139)
- Correct as of 13 November 2025
International career
Years	Team	Apps	(Points)
2026–	France	1	(0)
- Correct as of 18 July 2026

Paul Graou (born 25 July 1997) is a French rugby union player. He currently plays as a scrum-half for Toulouse in the Top 14 and for the France national rugby union team.

== Early career ==
Born in Auch, Graou began his playing career at FC Auch Gers, playing alongside Antoine Dupont, Grégory Alldritt, Anthony Jelonch and Pierre Bourgarit.

== Professional career ==
Following Auch's relegation, Graou joined Montauban. After his contract expired in 2021, Graou joined Agen for the 2021–22 Rugby Pro D2 season.

Graou subsequently signed a two-year deal with Toulouse.

== International career ==
On 29 June 2026, following the withdrawal of Dupont, Graou was called up to the national team French national team for the first time for the 2026 Nations Championship Southern Hemisphere Series. He made his international debut against Japan on 18 July.

== Personal life ==
Graou is the son of former French international player Stéphane Graou.

== Honours ==
Toulouse

- European Rugby Champions Cup:
  - Winner: 2024
- Top 14:
  - Winner: 2023, 2024, 2025, 2026
