= Baptiste Erdocio =

French rugby union player

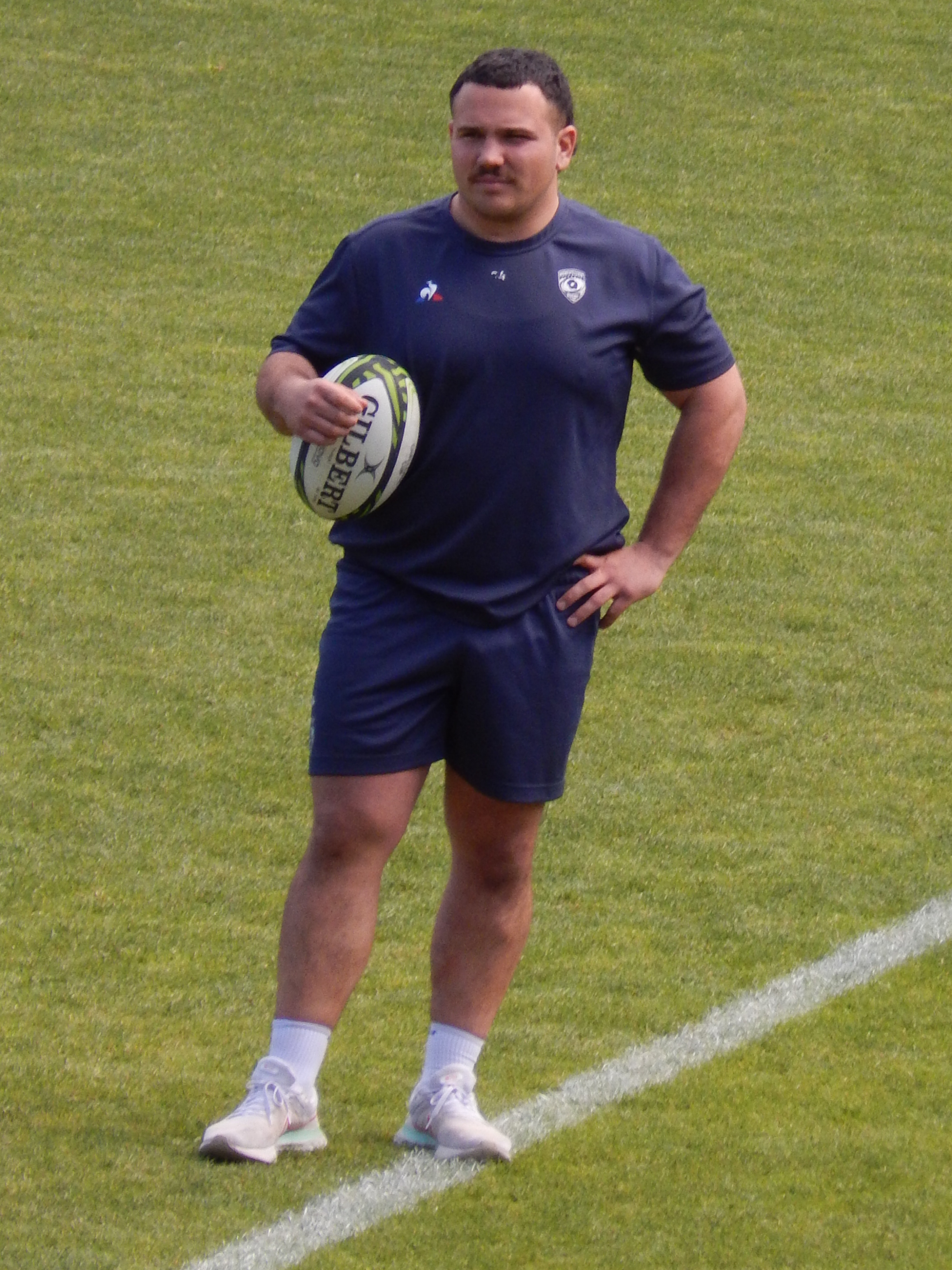
- Born: 13 March 2000 (age 26) Bidart, France
- Height: 175 cm (5 ft 9 in)
- Weight: 115 kg (254 lb; 18 st 2 lb)

Rugby union career
- Position: Prop
- Current team: Montpellier
Senior career
Years	Team	Apps	(Points)
2021–2023	Biarritz	51	(20)
2023–	Montpellier	61	(20)
- Correct as of 14 December 2025
International career
Years	Team	Apps	(Points)
2025–	France	3	(0)
- Correct as of 14 December 2025

Baptiste Erdocio (born 13 March 2000) is a French rugby union player, who plays for Montpellier. His preferred position is prop.

== Early career ==
Erdocio is from Bidart and began playing rugby at the Bidart club. He joined the Biarritz academy in 2014 representing their junior sides.

== Professional career ==
Erdocio made his debut for Biarritz in the 2021–22 Top 14 season against Lyon. He would remain with Biarritz following relegation, however in May 2023 signed for Montpellier. He debuted in the opening round of the 2023/24 season.

Erdocio was called into the France for the 2025 mid-year rugby union tests. He appeared in the French XV side against England XV before the tour. He then made his debut for the side against New Zealand in the second test of the 2025 France rugby union tour of New Zealand.
