= Pierre-Louis Barassi =

French rugby union footballer (born 1998)

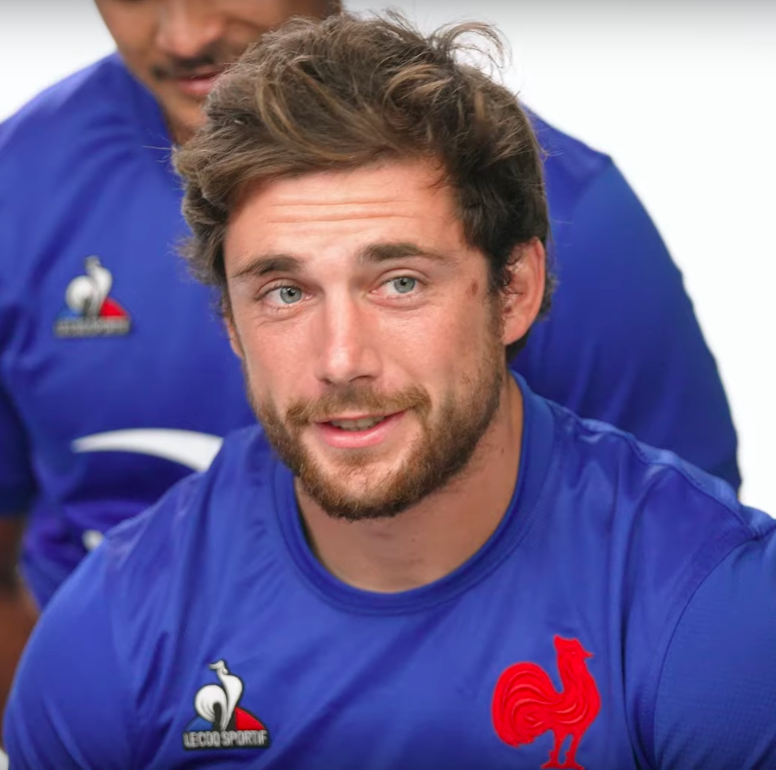
- Barassi representing France during the Autumn Internationals
- Born: 22 April 1998 (age 28) Sélestat, France
- Height: 1.88 m (6 ft 2 in)
- Weight: 102 kg (225 lb; 16 st 1 lb)

Rugby union career
- Position: Centre
- Current team: Toulouse
Senior career
Years	Team	Apps	(Points)
2016–2022	Lyon	74	(105)
2022–	Toulouse	53	(47)
- Correct as of 22 January 2025
International career
Years	Team	Apps	(Points)
2017–2018	France U20	9	(5)
2019–	France	13	(10)
- Correct as of 14 March 2026
National sevens team
Years	Team		Comps
2017	France		3
- Correct as of 28 March 2023

Pierre-Louis Barassi (born 22 April 1998) is a French professional rugby union player who plays as a centre for Top 14 club Toulouse and the France national team.

== Professional career ==
Barassi made his Lyon debut during the 2016–17 Challenge Cup, going on to obtain three additional caps and score one try. He did not, however, make an appearance in the Top 14 competition. In addition, he continued to play for France's seven-a-side team from 2017 to 2018, and he was a member of the France under-20 team that won the 2018 World Rugby Under 20 Championship.

Barassi played on nineteen occasions for Lyon in the 2018–19 season, including five appearances in the Champions Cup, and scoring two tries. He was selected for the France national team in the Rugby World Cup after a successful season with Lyon, and he was placed on the substitutes' bench for their match against Tonga. Not included in the initial roster, but brought in after France's opening match against Argentina as Wesley Fofana's injury replacement.

== Career statistics ==
=== International tries ===
International tries scored by Pierre-Louis Barassi
No.	Date	Venue	Opponent	Score	Result	Competition
1	17 July 2021	Suncorp Stadium, Brisbane, Australia	Australia	20–25	33–30	2021 Australia test series
2	23 February 2025	Stadio Olimpico, Rome, Italy	Italy	24–73	24–73	2025 Six Nations

== Honours ==
Toulouse

- 1x European Rugby Champions Cup: 2024
- 3x Top 14: 2023, 2024, 2025

Lyon

- 1× EPCR Challenge Cup: 2022

France U20

- 1× Six Nations Under 20s Championship: 2018
- 1× World Rugby Under 20 Championship: 2018

France

- 2x Six Nations Championship: 2025, 2026
