= Léo Barré =

France international rugby union player

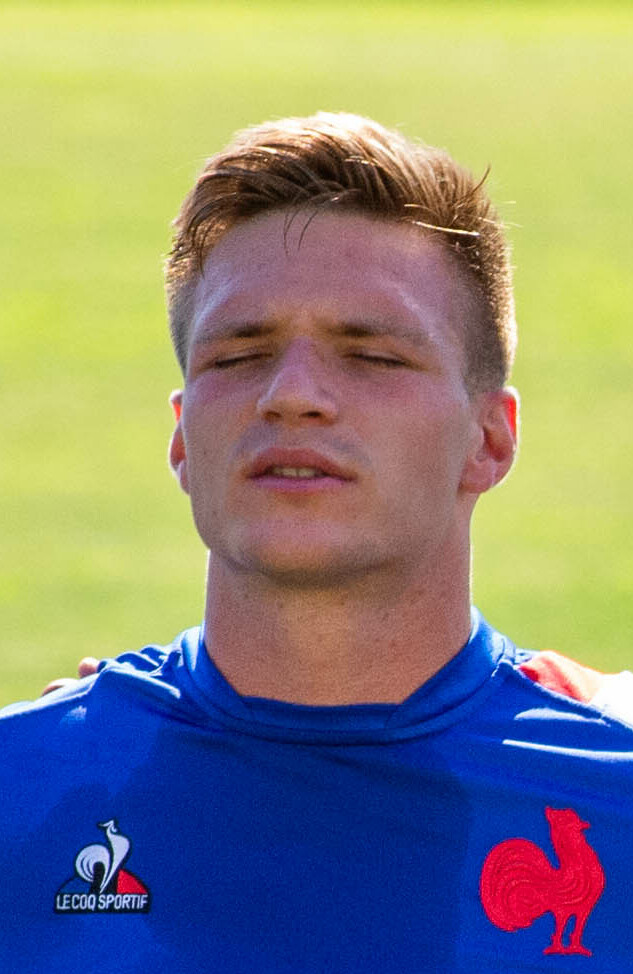
- Born: Léo Barré; 20 August 2002 (age 24) Le Chesnay, France
- Height: 1.89 m (6 ft 2 1/2 in)
- Weight: 93 kg (14 st 9 lb; 205 lb)

Rugby union career
- Position(s): Fly-half, Centre, Full-back
- Current team: Stade Français
Youth career
- 2009–2014: RC Versailles
- 2014–2020: Massy
Senior career
Years	Team	Apps	(Points)
2020–	Stade Français	134	(225)
- Correct as of 22 September 2026
International career
Years	Team	Apps	(Points)
2021–2022	France U20	10	(32)
2024–	France	9	(20)
- Correct as of 19 July 2025

Léo Barré (born 20 August 2002) is a French professional rugby union player, who plays as a fly-half for French Top 14 club Stade Français and the France national team.

== Career statistics ==
=== List of international tries ===
International tries
No.	Date	Venue	Opponent	Score	Result	Competition
1	16 March 2024	Parc Olympique Lyonnais, Lyon, France	England	21–24	33–31	2024 Six Nations
2	23 February 2025	Stadio Olimpico, Rome, Italy	Italy	17–33	24–73	2025 Six Nations
3	23 February 2025	Stadio Olimpico, Rome, Italy	Italy	24–59	24–73	2025 Six Nations
4	12 July 2025	Sky Stadium, Wellington, New Zealand	New Zealand	29–8	43–17	2025 New Zealand test series

== Honours ==
France

- 1x Six Nations Championship: 2025
