= Tyler Duguid =

Canadian rugby union player

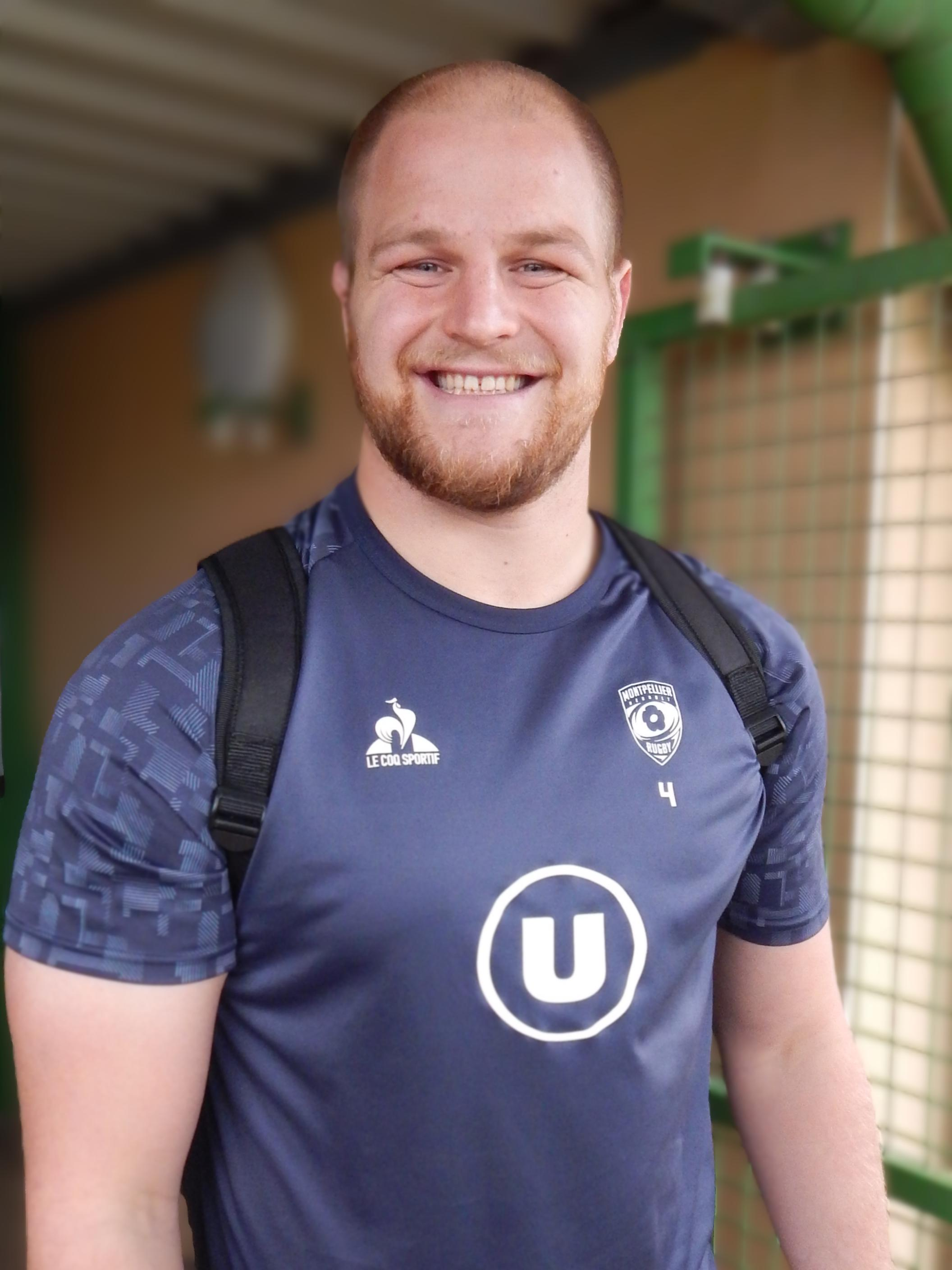
- Duguid in 2025
- Born: Tyler Evan Macgregor Duguid; 17 October 2000 (age 26) Edmonton, Canada
- Height: 2.00 m (6 ft 7 in)
- Weight: 124 kg (273 lb)
- University: University of Alberta

Rugby union career
- Position: Lock
Youth career
- 2019–2020: Narbonne
- 2020–: Montpellier
Amateur team(s)
| Years | Team | Apps | (Points) |
| 2011–2018 | Edmonton Nor'westers | | |
Senior career
| Years | Team | Apps | (Points) |
| 2020– | Montpellier | 18 | (0) |
- Correct as of 19 October 2022
Provincial / State sides
| Years | Team | Apps | (Points) |
| 2015–2018 | Alberta Canada | | |
International career
| Years | Team | Apps | (Points) |
| 2017 | Canada U20 | 7 | (0) |
| 2025– | France | 2 | (5) |
- Correct as of 21 November 2026

Tyler Duguid (born 17 October 2000), is a Canadian-French rugby union player. His usual playing position is in the second row as a Lock. He currently plays for Montpellier in the French Top 14. Tyler made his test debut for France against New Zealand, in Dunedin, NZ, July 2025

== Career ==
=== Club ===
Duguid spent the 2019–2020 season with the RC Narbonne espoirs program.

Duguid signed a two-year academy deal with Montpellier in June 2020. March 24, 2019 Canadian Junior Greco Roman Wrestling Champion at 120 kg https://wrestling.ca/thoms-and-duguid-named-outstanding-greco-roman-wrestlers/

=== Club statistics ===
As of 6 June 2021

| Season | Competition | Team | Games | Starts | Sub | Tries | Cons | Pens | Drops | Points | Yel | Red |
|---|---|---|---|---|---|---|---|---|---|---|---|---|
| 2020-21 | Top 14 | Montpellier | 6 | 6 | 0 | 0 | 0 | 0 | 0 | 0 | 1 | 0 |
| 2020-21 | Challenge Cup | Montpellier | 3 | 0 | 3 | 0 | 0 | 0 | 0 | 0 | 0 | 0 |
| Total | | | 9 | 6 | 3 | 0 | 0 | 0 | 0 | 0 | 1 | 0 |

=== Playing for France ===
In September 2024, in an article for Midi Olympique, Duguid declared his intention to play for France, instead of Canada, on residency grounds. Duguid was informed by his coaches that he could play for France once he secured French citizenship, and possessed a French passport.

On 15 June 2025, Duguid was named in the France A squad to face England XV on 21 June at Allianz Stadium, and was named in the squad to tour New Zealand in July. Duguid started in the first test, a narrow loss of 31-27, confirming his attachment to France. This was Duguid's only appearance on the tour.

On 21 November 2026, Duguid came off the bench to receive his second cap in the Nations Championship fixture against Argentina, including scoring his first test try in the 68th minute.

== Honours ==
- European Rugby Challenge Cup
  - Champion: 2021
