= Régis Montagne =

French rugby union player

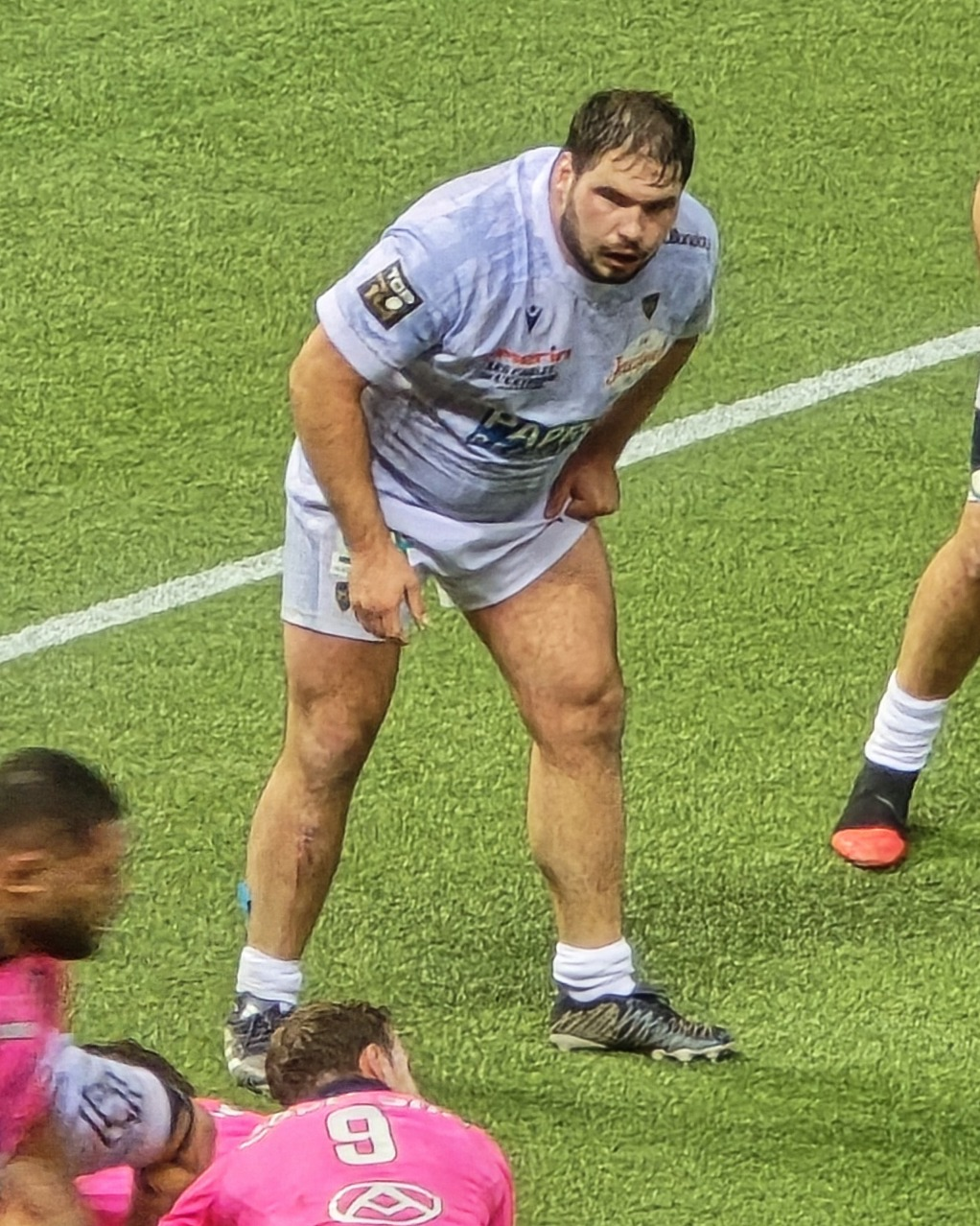
- Born: 30 September 2000 (age 26) Grenoble, France
- Height: 1.86 m (6 ft 1 in)
- Weight: 133 kg (293 lb)

Rugby union career
- Position: Tighthead prop
Senior career
Years	Team	Apps	(Points)
2019–2024	Grenoble	81	(15)
2024–	ASM Clermont	32	(5)
- Correct as of 8 November 2025
International career
Years	Team	Apps	(Points)
2024–	France	7	(0)
- Correct as of 15 February 2026

Régis Montagne (born 30 September 2000) is a French rugby union player, who plays for ASM Clermont Auvergne in Top 14.

== Club career ==
Régis Montagne made his professional debut for FC Grenoble Rugby on the 23 August 2019 in a Pro D2 game.

== International career ==
Régis Montagne was first called to the France senior team in the summer 2025 for the New Zealand tour.

== Honours ==
France

- 1x Six Nations Championship: 2026
