= Thibaud Flament =

France international rugby union player

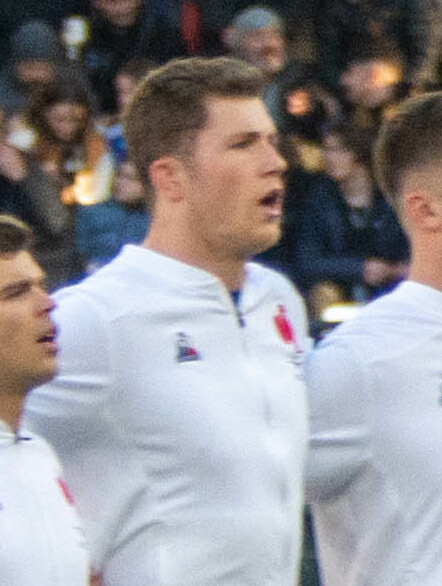
- Flament representing France during the Six Nations Championship
- Born: 29 April 1997 (age 29) Paris, France
- Height: 2.03 m (6 ft 8 in)
- Weight: 116 kg (256 lb; 18 st 4 lb)

Rugby union career
- Position(s): Lock, Flanker
- Current team: Toulouse
Senior career
Years	Team	Apps	(Points)
2017–2018	Club Newman	16	
2018–2019	Loughborough Students	24	(50)
2019–2020	Wasps	16	(5)
2020–	Toulouse	76	(40)
- Correct as of 12 November 2024
International career
Years	Team	Apps	(Points)
2021–	France	38	(30)
- Correct as of 14 March 2026

Thibaud Flament (born 29 April 1997) is a French professional rugby union player who plays as a lock for Top 14 club Toulouse and the France national team.

== Early life ==
Born in Paris, Thibaud Flament grew up in Brussels, Belgium where his father worked and founded an amateur rugby union club. He started rugby at the age of 8, playing for ASUB Waterloo, one of the best clubs in Belgium. He left Belgium for the United Kingdom and Loughborough University to pursue his college studies, at the age of 18.

== Club career ==
Flament began playing rugby for Loughborough Students RUFC, the famous British college team. Playing usually as a fly-half, he started in the fifth team and then changed of position, being converted to the second row due to his height and his weight gain. In 2017, he spent one placement year in Argentina playing for Club Newman before returning to Loughborough, now a first-teamer and an important player.

Consequently, he drew the attention of Wasps and joined the Premiership team academy in June 2019. On 21 September 2019, he made his professional debut against Saracens in the 2019–20 Premiership Rugby Cup and scored a try.

After playing sixteen games with the Coventry club, Flament signed for Toulouse on 17 August 2020. In his first year with the French club, he won the 2020-21 Top 14 and the 2020–21 European Rugby Champions Cup and then extended his contract until 2026 on 8 June 2022.

== International career ==
He was first called to the French national senior team by Fabien Galthié on 18 October 2021, for the autumn internationals. He earned his first cap for France on 6 November 2021 against Argentina, scoring a try on his debut. In 2022, he won the 2022 Six Nations Championship and the Grand Slam, clinching the title with a 25–13 win over England at the Stade de France.

== Career statistics ==
=== List of international tries ===
International tries
No.	Date	Venue	Opponent	Score	Result	Competition
1	6 November 2021	Stade de France, Saint-Denis, France	Argentina	14–10	29–20	2021 Autumn internationals
2	5 February 2023	Stadio Olimpico, Rome, Italy	Italy	0–5	24–29	2023 Six Nations
3	11 March 2023	Twickenham, London, England	England	0–15	10–53	2023 Six Nations
4	11 March 2023	Twickenham, London, England	England	10–32	10–53	2023 Six Nations
5	21 September 2023	Stade Vélodrome, Marseille, France	Namibia	38–0	96–0	2023 Rugby World Cup
6	22 November 2024	Stade de France, Saint-Denis, France	Argentina	5–0	37–23	2024 Autumn internationals

== Honours ==
Toulouse

- 2× European Rugby Champions Cup: 2021, 2024
- 4× Top 14: 2021, 2023, 2024, 2025

France

- 3x Six Nations Championship: 2022, 2025, 2026
- 1× Grand Slam: 2022
