= Alexandre Fischer =

French rugby union player

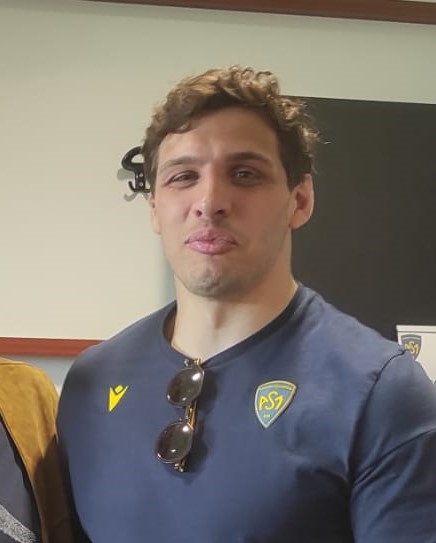
- Born: Alexandre Fischer; 19 January 1998 (age 28) Chaumont, France
- Height: 1.88 m (6 ft 2 in)
- Weight: 107 kg (16 st 12 lb; 236 lb)

Rugby union career
- Position: Back row
- Current team: Clermont
Amateur team(s)
Years	Team	Apps	(Points)
2011–2013	US Issoire		
2013–2018	Clermont		
Senior career
Years	Team	Apps	(Points)
2018–	Clermont	24	(15)
- Correct as of 6 September 2020
International career
Years	Team	Apps	(Points)
2025–	France	2	(0)
- Correct as of 19 July 2025

Alexandre Fischer (born 19 January 1998) is a French rugby union player. His position is back row and he currently plays for Clermont in the Top 14.

== Honours ==
France

- 1x Six Nations Championship: 2026
