= Matthias Halagahu =

French rugby union player

- Born: 15 August 2001 (age 25) Fréjus, France
- Height: 1.94 m (6 ft 4 1/2 in)
- Weight: 117 kg (258 lb)

Rugby union career
- Position: Lock
Youth career
- 2005–2006: RC Draguignan
- 2006–2015: CARF
- 2015–2020: Toulon
Senior career
Years	Team	Apps	(Points)
2020–	Toulon	73	(0)
- Correct as of 17 January 2024
International career
Years	Team	Apps	(Points)
2025–	France	2	(0)
- Correct as of 19 July 2025

Matthias Halagahu (born 15 August 2001) is a French professional rugby union player, who plays as a lock for Top 14 side Toulon. Born in Metropolitan France, he is of Wallisian descent through his father and made his debut with his club in October 2020.

== Club career ==
Matthias Halagahu made his professional debut for RC Toulon on the 23 October 2020, against Castres Olympique in Top 14.

== International career ==
Matthias Halagahu was first called to the France senior team in January 2024 for the Six Nations Championship.

== Honours ==
France

- 1x Six Nations Championship: 2025
