= Giorgi Beria =

French rugby union player (born 1999)

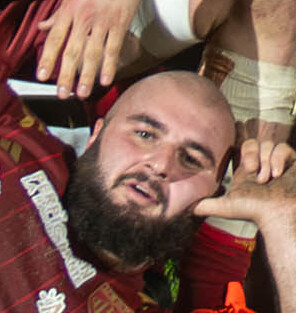
- Beria with Perpignan in 2025
- Born: 11 November 1999 (age 27) Tbilisi, Georgia
- Height: 1.75 m (5 ft 9 in)
- Weight: 108 kg (17.0 st; 238 lb)

Rugby union career
- Position: Prop
Senior career
Years	Team	Apps	(Points)
2019–2024	Clermont	90	(30)
2024–	Perpignan	29	(0)
- Correct as of 7 February 2025
International career
Years	Team	Apps	(Points)
2019	France U20	10	(0)
2025–	France	1	(0)
- Correct as of 19 July 2025

Giorgi Beria (born 11 November 1999) is a French professional rugby union footballer who plays as a prop forward for USA Perpignan.

== Early life ==
Born in Tbilisi, Georgia, he arrived in France with his parents into Aurillac at the age of two years-old.

== Club career ==
He started playing rugby union at Stade Aurillacois, before joining ASM Clermont Auvergne. He made his first start for the club in the European Rugby Cup at home against Bath Rugby on 15 December 2019. In January 2022, he signed a new 18-month contract with the club.

He signed for USA Perpignan ahead of the 2024–25 season.

== International career ==
He played for France U20 and was selected for the U20 World Cup in 2019, appearing as a second half replacement in the final in which France beat Australia U20.

In January 2025, he was called up to the France national rugby union team ahead of the 2025 Six Nations Championship.

== Honours ==
France

- 1x French New Zealand Tour: 2025
