= Nolann Le Garrec =

French rugby union player (born 2002)

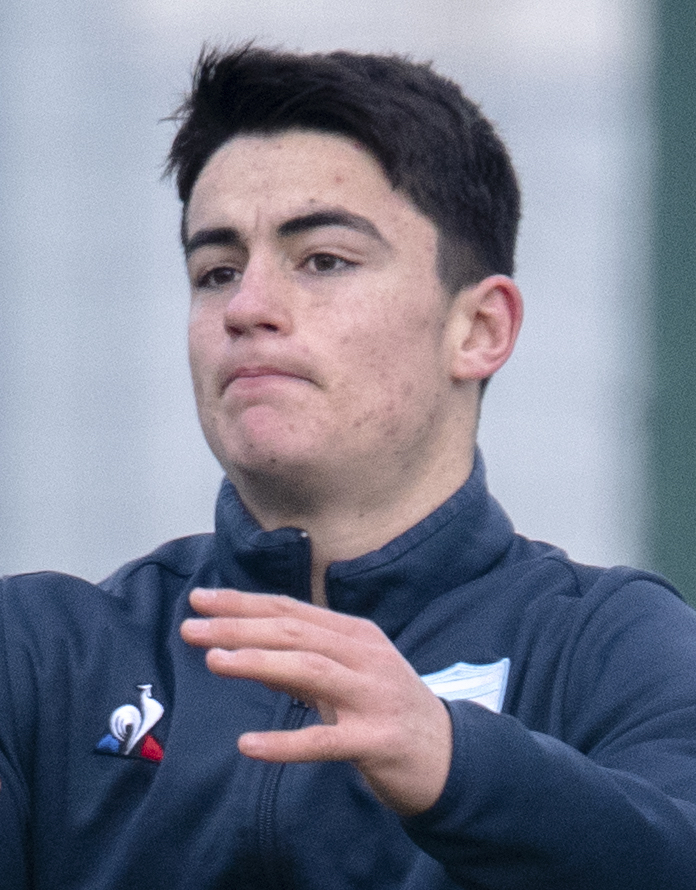
- Le Garrec playing for Racing 92 U21 in 2020
- Born: Nolann Le Garrec; 14 May 2002 (age 24) Vannes, France
- Height: 1.75 m (5 ft 9 in)
- Weight: 75 kg (11 st 11 lb; 165 lb)

Rugby union career
- Position: Scrum-half
- Current team: La Rochelle
Youth career
- 2010–2017: Vannes
- 2017–2020: Racing 92
Senior career
Years	Team	Apps	(Points)
2020–2025	Racing 92	104	(619)
2025–	La Rochelle	0	(0)
- Correct as of 31 August 2025
International career
Years	Team	Apps	(Points)
2020–2021	France U20	8	(34)
2024–	France	14	(40)
- Correct as of 8 November 2025

Nolann Le Garrec (born 14 May 2002) is a French rugby union player. He currently plays as a scrum-half for La Rochelle in the Top 14 and for the France national rugby union team.

Coming from Morbihan, he began his career with Vannes before moving to Racing 92 in 2017.

== Career ==
Nolann Le Garrec was called by Fabien Galthié to the French national team for the first time in June 2022, for the summer tour of Japan.

== Career statistics ==
=== List of international tries ===
International tries
No.	Date	Venue	Opponent	Score	Result	Competition
1	10 March 2024	Millennium Stadium, Cardiff, Wales	Wales	17–18	24–45	2024 Six Nations
2	16 March 2024	Parc Olympique Lyonnais, Lyon, France	England	8–3	33–31	2024 Six Nations
3	19 July 2025	Waikato Stadium, Hamilton, New Zealand	New Zealand	0–5	29–19	2025 New Zealand test series

== Honours ==
France

- 1x Six Nations Championship: 2025
