= Romain Buros =

French rugby union player

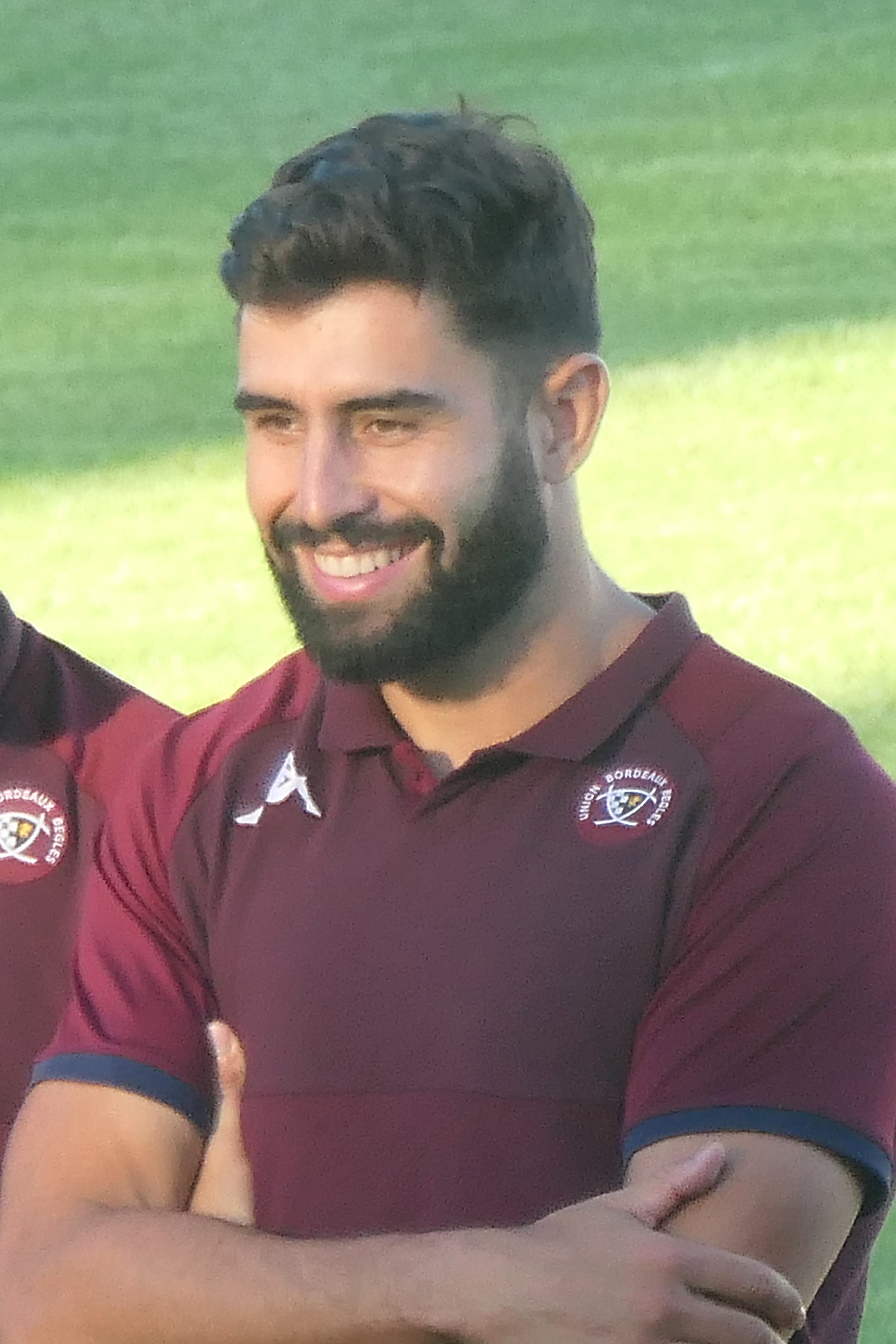
- Buros with Bordeaux Bègles in 2022
- Born: 31 July 1997 (age 29) Aire-sur-l'Adour, France
- Height: 1.87 m (6 ft 1 1/2 in)
- Weight: 89 kg (196 lb)

Rugby union career
- Position(s): Full-back, Wing
- Current team: Bordeaux Bègles
Youth career
- 2004–2013: Aire-sur-l'Adour
- 2013–2015: Pau
Senior career
Years	Team	Apps	(Points)
2015–2018	Pau	13	(10)
2018–	Bordeaux Bègles	128	(155)
- Correct as of 23 October 2024
International career
Years	Team	Apps	(Points)
2016–2017	France U20	18	(15)
2024–	France	1	(5)
- Correct as of 16 November 2024

Romain Buros (born 31 July 1997) is a French rugby union player, who plays mainly as a full-back for Union Bordeaux Bègles.

== Biography ==
Romain Buros started playing rugby for his hometown club Aire-sur-l'Adour, before joining Pau academy. After playing his first professional games with Pau, he joined the Bordeaux Bègles in 2018, where he really became a regular starter in Top 14.

He was first called to the France national team by Fabien Galthié on the 18 October 2021, for the autumn internationals.

=== List of international tries ===
International tries
No.	Date	Venue	Opponent	Score	Result	Competition
1	16 November 2024	Stade de France, Saint-Denis, France	New Zealand	8–14	30–29	2024 Autumn internationals

== Honours ==
Bordeaux Bègles

- 1× European Rugby Champions Cup: 2025

France

- 1x Six Nations Championship: 2026
