= Joshua Brennan =

France international rugby union player

- Born: Joshua Brennan; 28 November 2001 (age 24) Leixlip, Co. Kildare, Ireland
- Height: 1.99 m (6 ft 6 1/2 in)
- Weight: 118 kg (18 st 8 lb; 260 lb)

Rugby union career
- Position: Lock
- Current team: Toulouse
Amateur team(s)
Years	Team	Apps	(Points)
2008–2012	TLA XV		
2012–2020	Toulouse		
Senior career
Years	Team	Apps	(Points)
2020–	Toulouse	70	(50)
- Correct as of 21 January 2025
International career
Years	Team	Apps	(Points)
2020–2021	France U20	4	(5)
2025–	France	3	(5)
- Correct as of 14 March 2026

Joshua Brennan (born 28 November 2001) is a French international rugby union player. His position is lock and he plays for Toulouse in the Top 14.

== Early life ==
Born in Leixlip, Co. Kildare, Brennan grew up in Toulouse, where his father Trevor Brennan played with Toulouse. He started rugby with the Aucamville Academy before joining Toulouse at the age of 12.

== Career statistics ==
=== List of international tries ===
International tries
No.	Date	Venue	Opponent	Score	Result	Competition
1	12 July 2025	Sky Stadium, Wellington, New Zealand	New Zealand	43–15	43–17	2025 New Zealand test series

== Personal life ==
He is the son of former Ireland international Trevor Brennan and the brother of Toulon prop Daniel Brennan

== Honours ==
France

- 1x Six Nations Championship: 2026
