= Bastien Vergnes-Taillefer =

France international rugby union player

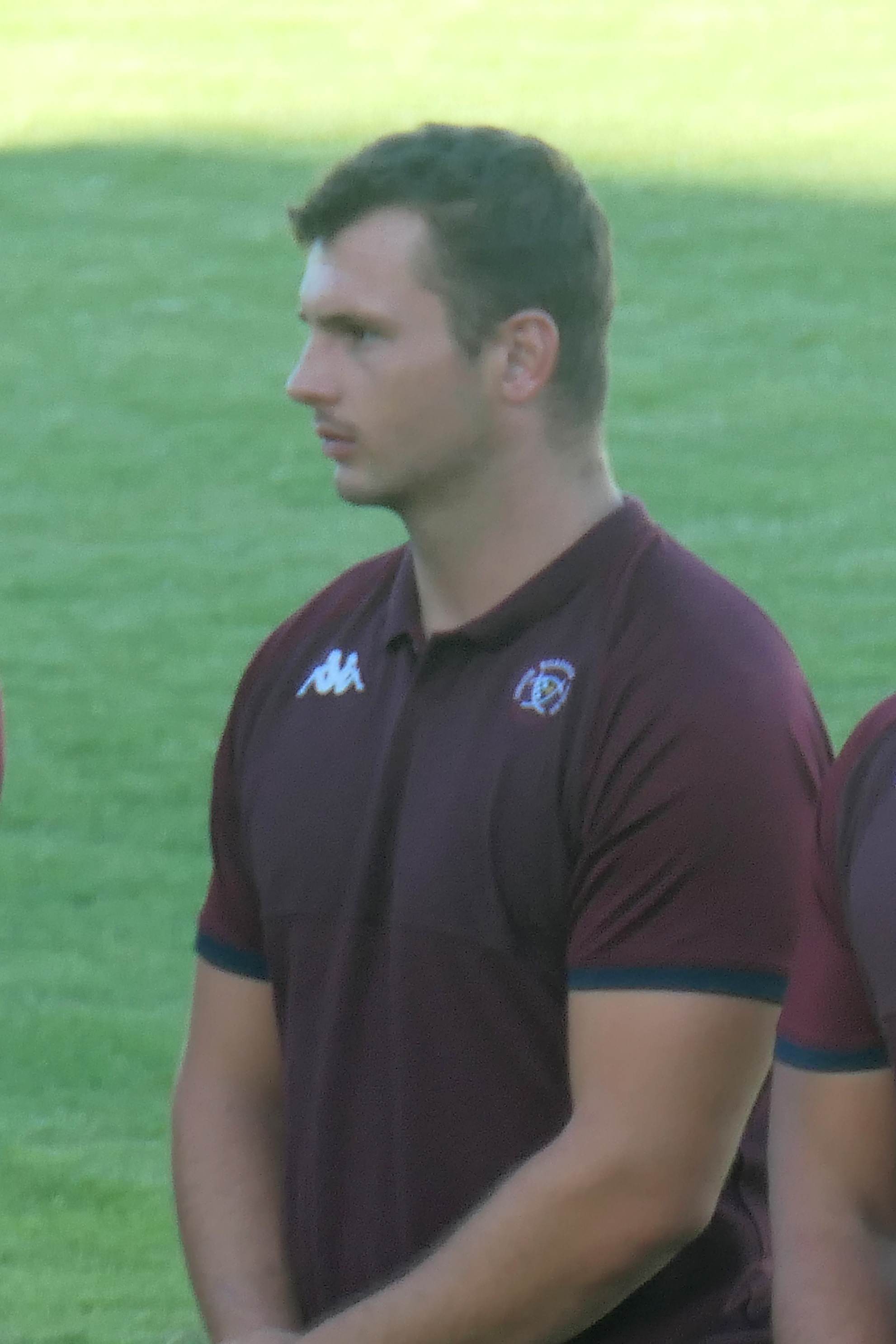
- Vergnes-Taillefer representing Bordeaux Bègles during the Top 14
- Born: 13 June 1997 (age 29) Auterive, France
- Height: 1.94 m (6 ft 4 in)
- Weight: 114 kg (251 lb; 17 st 13 lb)

Rugby union career
- Position(s): Number 8, Flanker
- Current team: Bordeaux Bègles
Senior career
Years	Team	Apps	(Points)
2018–2021	Colomiers	39	(5)
2021–	Bordeaux Bègles	88	(10)
- Correct as of 19 July 2025
International career
Years	Team	Apps	(Points)
2025–	France	1	(0)

Bastien Vergnes-Taillefer (born 13 June 1997) is a French professional rugby union player who plays as a number eight for Top 14 club Bordeaux Bègles.

== Professional career ==
Coming from Haute-Garonne, Bastien Vergnes-Taillefer became a professional player with Colomiers and then signed for Bordeaux Bègles, discovering the Top 14.

He was called by Fabien Galthié to the French national team for the first time in June 2022, for the summer tour of Japan.

== Honours ==
Bordeaux Bègles

- 1× European Rugby Champions Cup: 2025
