= Pierre Bochaton =

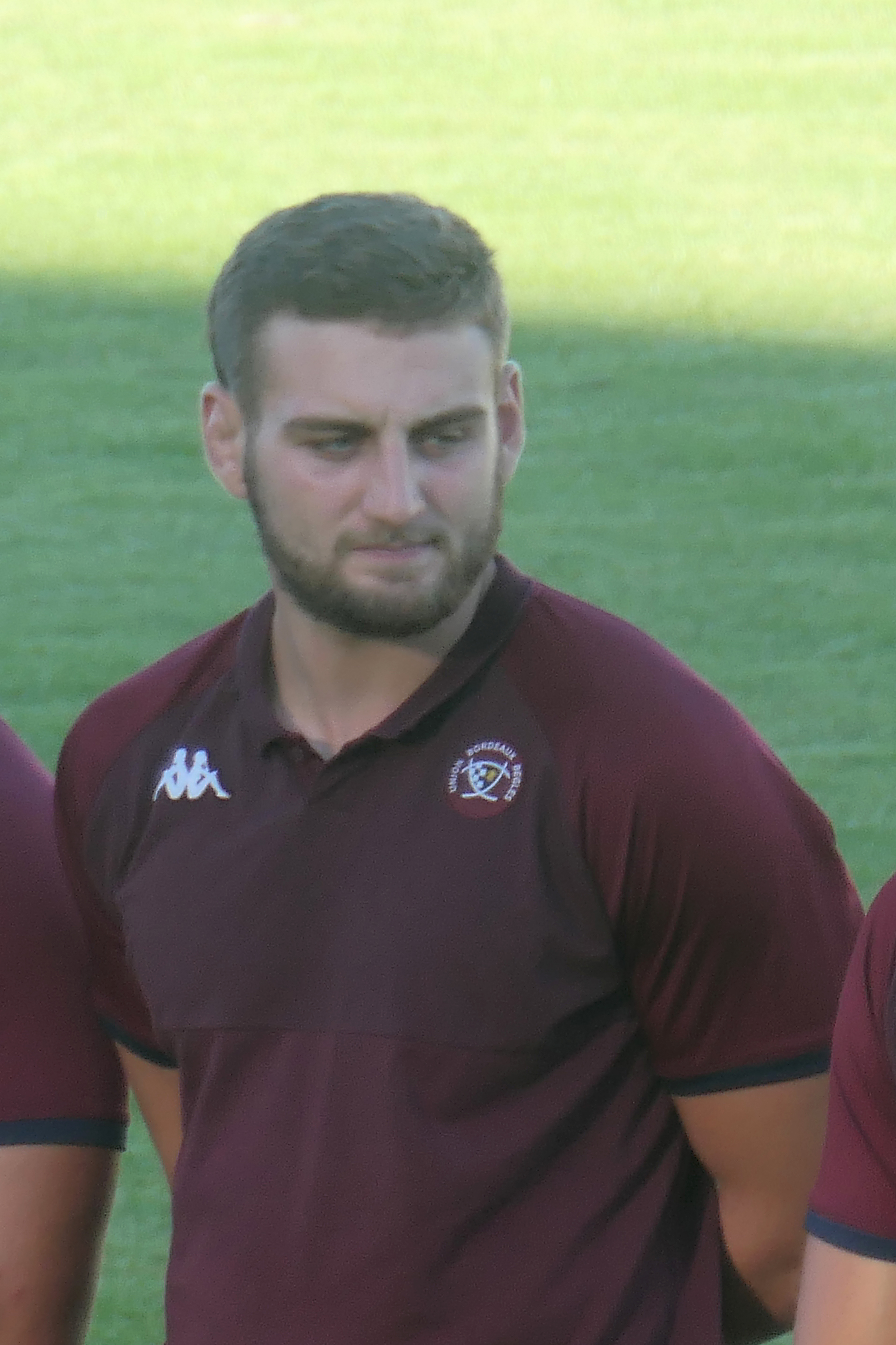
- Bochaton in 2022
- Full name: Pierre Bochaton
- Born: 17 April 2001 (age 25) Lyon, France
- Height: 1.97 m (6 ft 6 in)
- Weight: 103 kg (227 lb; 16 st 3 lb)

Rugby union career
- Position: Flanker
- Current team: Bordeaux Bègles
Senior career
Years	Team	Apps	(Points)
2020–2021	Bourg-en-Bresse	9	(0)
2021–	Bordeaux Bègles	68	(15)
- Correct as of 28 October 2025
International career
Years	Team	Apps	(Points)
2021	France U20	5	(5)
2025–	France	2	(0)
- Correct as of 19 July 2025

Pierre Bochaton (born 17 April 2001) is a French professional rugby union player who plays as a flanker for Top 14 club Bordeaux Bègles and the France national team.
