= Joris Segonds =

- Full name: Joris Segonds
- Born: 6 April 1997 (age 29) Decazeville, France
- Height: 1.80 m (5 ft 11 in)
- Weight: 96 kg (212 lb; 15 st 2 lb)

Rugby union career
- Position: Fly-half
- Current team: Bayonne
Youth career
- 2003–2013: SC Decazeville
- 2013–2016: Aurillac
Senior career
Years	Team	Apps	(Points)
2016–2019	Aurillac	64	(465)
2019–2024	Stade Français	125	(1,037)
2024–	Bayonne	56	(434)
- Correct as of 22 Sep 2026
International career
Years	Team	Apps	(Points)
2025–	France	2	(3)
- Correct as of 19 July 2025

Joris Segonds (born 7 April 1997) is a French professional rugby union player who plays as a Fly-half for Top 14 club Bayonne.
