= List of Six Nations Championship Player of the Championship winners =

The Six Nations Player of the Championship is a rugby union award given annually to the best-performing player in the Six Nations Championship. The accolade has been awarded since 2004. Recipients of the award are shortlisted by a panel made up from rugby writers, broadcasters and former players across the six participating nations, before being put forward to a public vote, where the player with the most votes is declared the winner. The Six Nations Team of the Championship is also included in this article.

== Methodology ==
The methodology for the selection of shortlisting players and the number of players shortlisted has changed multiple times over the years. For the first couple of years, the vote was run by BBC Sport, whose panel of experts shortlisted the potential candidates that people voted for on the BBC Sport website. In 2006 and 2007, Six Nations Rugby took control of the voting and requested fans to select their dream team on their official website each weekend with the player that appeared more often within the fans dream teams over the weekends winning the title of player of the championship. From 2008 to 2010, an expert panel of former players from each of the six nations was reinstated to shortlist six candidates (as opposed to the usual 15–20 candidates that had been shortlisted in previous years) for the public vote.

From 2011 to 2012, Six Nations Rugby changed how players were shortlisted by removing the expert panel and putting forward all players that had received the "Player of the Match" award from the host broadcaster of the matches within the first four rounds, which resulted in an increase in number of players shortlisted to 12. In 2013 and 2014, Six Nations Rugby together with their partners RBS and Accenture developed an algorithm to measure match stats and social media fan sentiment to rate players that would be shortlisted for the Player of the Championship, and they increased the number of players shortlisted to 15. In 2015, the measuring of social media fan sentiment to players was dropped as a criterion for shortlisting and the number of shortlisted candidates was reduced to 12. However, the panel of former rugby players was reinstated for a third time in 2016 and 2017, while retaining the number of 12 shortlisted players.

From 2018 to 2020, the expert panel was made up of rugby writers, former players and broadcasters across the six participating nations and the number of shortlisted players was reduced to six. In 2021, the expert panel was made up of 12 Journalists and broadcasters, 2 from each of the participating six nations. Six Nations changed the method of shortlisting the candidates for 2024 Player of the Championship. Candidates were shortlisted based on been the most popular players selected by fans in their Team of the Championship.

Six Nations Rugby introduced the Six Nations Team of the Championship in 2021, following on from many rugby media outlets that previously selected their preferred team of the Championships. Fans vote their preferred played for each position on the Six Nations Rugby website once the final game of the championship has been played. The players with the highest votes in each position make up the Six Nations Team of the Championship. A second-string team was also revealed by Six Nations Rugby in 2023.

== Winners ==
| Year | Winner | Country | Position | Others shortlisted | Ref(s) |
|---|---|---|---|---|---|
| 2004 | Gordon D'Arcy | Ireland | Centre | England – Ben Cohen (Wing), Lawrence Dallaglio (Number eight), Danny Grewcock (Lock), France – Serge Betsen (Flanker), Yannick Jauzion (Centre), Sylvain Marconnet (Prop), Frédéric Michalak (Fly-half); Ireland – Shane Byrne (Hooker), Simon Easterby (Flanker), Paul O'Connell (Lock); Italy – Martin Castrogiovanni (Prop), Andrea de Rossi (Flanker), Sergio Parisse (Number eight); Scotland – Scott Murray (Lock), Simon Taylor (Number eight), Jason White (Lock), Wales – Gareth Cooper (Scrum-half), Michael Owen (Lock), Gareth Thomas (Full-back) | |
| 2005 | Martyn Williams | Wales | Flanker | England – Martin Corry (Number eight), Josh Lewsey (Full-back); France – Serge Betsen (Flanker), Yannick Nyanga (Flanker), Fabien Pelous (Lock), Dimitri Yachvili (Scrum-half); Ireland – Paul O'Connell (Lock), Brian O'Driscoll (Centre), Ronan O'Gara (Fly-half), Malcolm O'Kelly (Lock); Italy – Marco Bortolami (Lock), Alessandro Troncon (Scrum-half); Scotland – Chris Paterson (Fly-half), Sean Lamont (Centre), Jason White (Lock), Wales – Gavin Henson (Centre), Stephen Jones (Fly-half), Dwayne Peel (Scrum-half), Shane Williams (Wing) | |
| 2006 | Brian O'Driscoll | Ireland | Centre | England – Martin Corry (Number eight), Charlie Hodgson (Fly-half); France – Thomas Castaignede (Fly-half), Christophe Dominici (Wing), Florian Fritz (Centre), Raphaël Ibañez (Hooker), Ireland – Simon Easterby (Flanker), Jerry Flannery (Hooker), Shane Horgan (Wing), Denis Leamy (Number eight), Ronan O'Gara (Fly-half), David Wallace (Flanker); Italy – Mirco Bergamasco (Centre), Ramiro Pez (Fly-half); Scotland – Hugo Southwell (Centre), Jason White (Lock); Wales – Duncan Jones (Prop), Stephen Jones (Fly-half), Dwayne Peel (Scrum-half) | |
| 2007 | Brian O'Driscoll | Ireland | Centre | England – Josh Lewsey (Full-back), Joe Worsley (Flanker), France – Christophe Dominici (Wing), Raphaël Ibañez (Hooker), Yannick Jauzion (Centre); Ireland – Paul O'Connell (Lock), Ronan O'Gara (Fly-half), David Wallace (Flanker); Italy – Marco Bortolami (Lock), Carlos Nieto (Prop); Scotland – Sean Lamont (Centre), Wales – Gethin Jenkins (Prop), Ryan Jones (Number eight), Dwayne Peel (Scrum-half) | |
| 2008 | Shane Williams | Wales | Wing | France – Vincent Clerc (Wing); Italy – Sergio Parisse (Number eight); Scotland – Mike Blair (Scrum-half); Wales – Ryan Jones (Number eight); Wales – Mike Phillips (Scrum-half) | |
| 2009 | Brian O'Driscoll | Ireland | Centre | England – Delon Armitage (Full-back); Ireland – Jamie Heaslip (Number eight); Ireland – Paul O'Connell (Lock); Italy – Sergio Parisse (Number eight); Wales – Lee Byrne (Full-back) | |
| 2010 | Tommy Bowe | Ireland | Wing | France – Mathieu Bastareaud (Centre); France – Thierry Dusautoir (Flanker); France – Imanol Harinordoquy (Number eight); France – Morgan Parra (Scrum-half); Wales – Shane Williams (Wing) | |
| 2011 | Andrea Masi | Italy | Full-back | England – Chris Ashton (Wing), Toby Flood (Fly-half), James Haskell (Flanker), Tom Palmer (Lock); France – Thierry Dusautoir (Flanker), Maxime Médard (Full-back), Ireland – Sean O'Brien (Flanker), Ronan O'Gara (Fly-half); Italy – Fabio Semenzato (Scrum-half), Wales – James Hook (Fly-half), Sam Warburton (Flanker) | |
| 2012 | Dan Lydiate | Wales | Flanker | France – Imanol Harinordoquy (Number eight), Yoann Maestri (Lock), Julien Malzieu (Wing); Ireland – Donnacha Ryan (Lock), Johnny Sexton (Fly-half); Italy – Sergio Parisse (Number eight); Scotland – David Denton (Number eight), Ross Rennie (Flanker); Wales – Alex Cuthbert (Wing), Mike Phillips (Scrum-half), Sam Warburton (Flanker) | |
| 2013 | Leigh Halfpenny | Wales | Full-back | England – Owen Farrell (Fly-half), Chris Robshaw (Flanker); France – Mathieu Bastareaud (Centre), Nicolas Mas (Prop), Louis Picamoles (Number eight); Ireland – Conor Murray (Scrum-half), Brian O'Driscoll (Centre); Italy – Andrea Masi (Full-back), Sergio Parisse (Number eight), Alessandro Zanni (Flanker); Scotland – Stuart Hogg (Full-back); Wales – Dan Biggar (Fly-half), Adam Jones (Prop), Mike Phillips (Scrum-half) | |
| 2014 | Mike Brown | England | Full-back | England – Danny Care (Scrum-half), Owen Farrell (Fly-half), Chris Robshaw (Flanker); France – Brice Dulin (Full-back), Yoann Huget (Wing); Ireland – Cian Healy (Prop), Jamie Heaslip (Number eight), Rob Kearney (Full-back), Brian O'Driscoll (Centre), Johnny Sexton (Fly-half), Andrew Trimble (Wing); Italy – Leonardo Ghiraldini (Hooker); Scotland – David Denton (Number eight); Wales – Sam Warburton (Flanker) | |
| 2015 | Paul O'Connell | Ireland | Lock | England – George Ford (Fly-half), Jonathan Joseph (Centre), Billy Vunipola (Number eight), Ben Youngs (Scrum-half); Ireland – Robbie Henshaw (Centre), Conor Murray (Scrum-half); Italy – Sergio Parisse (Number eight); Scotland – Jonny Gray (Lock), Stuart Hogg (Full-back); Wales – Alun Wyn Jones (Lock), Dan Biggar (Fly-half) | |
| 2016 | Stuart Hogg | Scotland | Full-back | England – Jonathan Joseph (Centre), Jack Nowell (Wing), Billy Vunipola (Number eight); France – Guilhem Guirado (Hooker), Virimi Vakatawa (Wing); Ireland – Conor Murray (Scrum-half), Johnny Sexton (Fly-half); Italy – Sergio Parisse (Number eight); Scotland – Duncan Taylor (Centre); Wales – Gareth Davies (Scrum-half), George North (Wing) | |
| 2017 | Stuart Hogg | Scotland | Full-back | England – Owen Farrell (Fly-half), Maro Itoje (Lock), Joe Launchbury (Lock); France – Camille Lopez (Fly-half), Louis Picamoles (Number eight); Ireland – Conor Murray (Scrum-half), CJ Stander (Number eight); Italy – Sergio Parisse (Number eight); Scotland – Finn Russell (Fly-half); Wales – Rhys Webb (Scrum-half), Ken Owens (Hooker) | |
| 2018 | Jacob Stockdale | Ireland | Wing | France – Guilhem Guirado (Hooker); Ireland – Keith Earls (Wing); Ireland – Conor Murray (Scrum-half); Ireland – Johnny Sexton (Fly-half); Italy – Matteo Minozzi (Wing) | |
| 2019 | Alun Wyn Jones | Wales | Lock | England – Tom Curry (Flanker); England – Jonny May (Wing); Wales – Josh Adams (Wing); Wales – Hadleigh Parkes (Centre); Wales – Liam Williams (Full-back) | |
| 2020 | Antoine Dupont | France | Scrum-half | England – Maro Itoje (Lock); England – Ben Youngs (Scrum-half); France – Grégory Alldritt (Number eight); France – Romain Ntamack (Fly-half); Ireland – CJ Stander (Number eight) | |
| 2021 | Hamish Watson | Scotland | Flanker | France – Antoine Dupont (Scrum-half); Ireland – Tadhg Beirne (Lock); Ireland – Robbie Henshaw (Centre); Wales – Taulupe Faletau (Number eight); Wales – Louis Rees-Zammit (Wing) | |
| 2022 | Antoine Dupont | France | Scrum-half | France – Grégory Alldritt (Number eight); Ireland – Josh van der Flier (Flanker) | |
| 2023 | Antoine Dupont | France | Scrum-half | France – Damian Penaud (Wing); France – Thomas Ramos (Full-back); Ireland – Caelan Doris (Number eight); Ireland – Mack Hansen (Wing); Ireland – Hugo Keenan (Full-back) | |
| 2024 | Tommaso Menoncello | Italy | Centre | England – Ben Earl (Number eight); Ireland – Bundee Aki (Centre); Scotland – Duhan van der Merwe (Wing) | |
| 2025 | Louis Bielle-Biarrey | France | Wing | England – Tommy Freeman (Wing); Italy – Tommaso Menoncello (Centre); Scotland – Blair Kinghorn (Full-back) | |
| 2026 | Louis Bielle-Biarrey | France | Wing | Italy – Tommaso Menoncello (Centre); Ireland – Stuart McCloskey (Centre); Scotland – Kyle Steyn (Wing) | |

=== Wins by player ===
| Player | Shortlisted | Wins | Years | Runner-up | Years |
|---|---|---|---|---|---|
| (Ireland) Brian O'Driscoll | 6 | 3 | 2006, 2007, 2009 | 3 | 2005, 2013, 2014 |
| (France) Antoine Dupont | 4 | 3 | 2020, 2022, 2023 | 1 | 2021 |
| (Scotland) Stuart Hogg | 4 | 2 | 2016, 2017 | 2 | 2013, 2015 |
| (France) Louis Bielle-Biarrey | 2 | 2 | 2025, 2026 | 0 | — |
| (Ireland) Paul O'Connell | 5 | 1 | 2015 | 4 | 2004, 2005, 2007, 2009 |
| (Italy) Tommaso Menoncello | 3 | 1 | 2024 | 2 | 2025, 2026 |
| (Wales) Shane Williams | 3 | 1 | 2008 | 2 | 2005, 2010 |
| (Wales) Alun Wyn Jones | 2 | 1 | 2019 | 1 | 2015 |
| (Italy) Andrea Masi | 2 | 1 | 2011 | 1 | 2013 |
| (Ireland) Tommy Bowe | 1 | 1 | 2010 | 0 | — |
| (England) Mike Brown | 1 | 1 | 2014 | 0 | — |
| (Ireland) Gordon D'Arcy | 1 | 1 | 2004 | 0 | — |
| (Wales) Leigh Halfpenny | 1 | 1 | 2013 | 0 | — |
| (Wales) Dan Lydiate | 1 | 1 | 2012 | 0 | — |
| (Ireland) Jacob Stockdale | 1 | 1 | 2018 | 0 | — |
| (Scotland) Hamish Watson | 1 | 1 | 2021 | 0 | — |
| (Wales) Martyn Williams | 1 | 1 | 2005 | 0 | — |

=== Wins by nation ===
| Nation | Wins | Years |
|---|---|---|
| Ireland | 7 | 2004, 2006, 2007, 2009, 2010, 2015, 2018 |
| Wales | 5 | 2005, 2008, 2012, 2013, 2019 |
| France | 5 | 2020, 2022, 2023, 2025, 2026 |
| Scotland | 3 | 2016, 2017, 2021 |
| Italy | 2 | 2011, 2024 |
| England | 1 | 2014 |

=== Wins by position ===
| Position | Wins | Years |
|---|---|---|
| Full-back | 5 | 2011, 2013, 2014, 2016, 2017 |
| Centre | 5 | 2004, 2006, 2007, 2009, 2024 |
| Wing | 5 | 2008, 2010, 2018, 2025, 2026 |
| Flanker | 3 | 2005, 2012, 2021 |
| Scrum-half | 3 | 2020, 2022, 2023 |
| Lock | 2 | 2015, 2019 |
| Fly-half | 0 | — |
| Number eight | 0 | — |
| Hooker | 0 | — |
| Prop | 0 | — |

== Six Nations Team of the Championship ==
| Year | 1st XV | 2nd XV | Ref(s) |
|---|---|---|---|
| 2021 | 1. (Wales) Wyn Jones; 2. (Wales) Ken Owens; 3. (Ireland) Tadhg Furlong; 4. (Ireland) Tadhg Beirne; 5. (Wales) Alun Wyn Jones; 6. (Ireland) CJ Stander; 7. (Scotland) Hamish Watson; 8. (Wales) Taulupe Faletau; 9. (France) Antoine Dupont; 10. (Ireland) Johnny Sexton; 11. (Scotland) Duhan van der Merwe; 12. (Ireland) Robbie Henshaw; 13. (Wales) George North; 14. (Wales) Louis Rees-Zammit; 15. (Scotland) Stuart Hogg | Not awarded | |
| 2022 | 1. (France) Cyril Baille; 2. (France) Julien Marchand; 3. (Ireland) Tadhg Furlong; 4. (England) Maro Itoje; 5. (France) Paul Willemse; 6. (France) François Cros; 7. (Ireland) Josh van der Flier; 8. (France) Grégory Alldritt; 9. (France) Antoine Dupont; 10. (France) Romain Ntamack; 11. (France) Gabin Villière; 12. (France) Jonathan Danty; 13. (France) Gaël Fickou; 14. (France) Damian Penaud; 15. (Ireland) Hugo Keenan | Not awarded | |
| 2023 | 1. (Ireland) Andrew Porter; 2. (Ireland) Dan Sheehan; 3. (Ireland) Finlay Bealham; 4. (France) Thibaud Flament; 5. (Ireland) James Ryan; 6. (Ireland) Peter O'Mahony; 7. (Ireland) Josh van der Flier; 8. (Ireland) Caelan Doris; 9. (France) Antoine Dupont; 10. (Ireland) Johnny Sexton; 11. (Ireland) James Lowe; 12. (Scotland) Sione Tuipulotu; 13. (Scotland) Huw Jones; 14. (France) Damian Penaud; 15. (Ireland) Hugo Keenan | 1. (Scotland) Pierre Schoeman; 2. (France) Julien Marchand; 3. (Ireland) Tadhg Furlong; 4. (Ireland) Tadhg Beirne; 5. (France) Paul Willemse; 6. (Scotland) Jamie Ritchie; 7. (France) Charles Ollivon; 8. (France) Grégory Alldritt; 9. (Ireland) Conor Murray; 10. (Scotland) Finn Russell; 11. (Scotland) Duhan van der Merwe; 12. (Ireland) Bundee Aki; 13. (Ireland) Garry Ringrose; 14. (Ireland) Mack Hansen; 15. (France) Thomas Ramos | |
| 2024 | 1. (Ireland) Andrew Porter; 2. (Ireland) Dan Sheehan; 3. (France) Uini Atonio; 4. (Ireland) Tadhg Beirne; 5. (Ireland) Joe McCarthy; 6. (Ireland) Caelan Doris; 7. (Italy) Michele Lamaro; 8. (England) Ben Earl; 9. (Ireland) Jamison Gibson-Park; 10. (Scotland) Finn Russell; 11. (Ireland) James Lowe; 12. (Italy) Tommaso Menoncello; 13. (Ireland) Bundee Aki; 14. (Scotland) Duhan van der Merwe; 15. (France) Thomas Ramos | Not awarded | |
| 2025 | 1. (Ireland) Andrew Porter; 2. (Ireland) Dan Sheehan; 3. (England) Will Stuart; 4. (England) Maro Itoje; 5. (France) Mickaël Guillard; 6. (England) Tom Curry; 7. (Wales) Jac Morgan; 8. (France) Grégory Alldritt; 9. (France) Antoine Dupont; 10. (England) Fin Smith; 11. (France) Louis Bielle-Biarrey; 12. (Italy) Tommaso Menoncello; 13. (Scotland) Huw Jones; 14. (England) Tommy Freeman; 15. (Scotland) Blair Kinghorn | Not awarded | |
| 2026 | 1. (Wales) Rhys Carré; 2. (Italy) Giacomo Nicotera; 3. (Italy) Simone Ferrari; 4. (Ireland) Tadhg Beirne; 5. (France) Mickaël Guillard; 6. (Ireland) Jack Conan; 7. (Scotland) Rory Darge; 8. (Ireland) Caelan Doris; 9. (France) Antoine Dupont; 10. (Scotland) Finn Russell; 11. (France) Louis Bielle-Biarrey; 12. (Ireland) Stuart McCloskey; 13. (Italy) Tommaso Menoncello; 14. (Scotland) Kyle Steyn; 15. (France) Thomas Ramos | Not awarded | |

=== Multiple 1st XV selections ===
| Player | Selected | Years |
|---|---|---|
| (France) Antoine Dupont | 5 | 2021, 2022, 2023, 2025, 2026 |
| (Ireland) Tadhg Beirne | 3 | 2021, 2024, 2026 |
| (Ireland) Caelan Doris | 3 | 2023, 2024, 2026 |
| (Italy) Tommaso Menoncello | 3 | 2024, 2025, 2026 |
| (Ireland) Andrew Porter | 3 | 2023, 2024, 2025 |
| (Ireland) Dan Sheehan | 3 | 2023, 2024, 2025 |
| (France) Grégory Alldritt | 2 | 2022, 2025 |
| (France) Louis Bielle-Biarrey | 2 | 2025, 2026 |
| (Ireland) Tadhg Furlong | 2 | 2021, 2022 |
| (England) Maro Itoje | 2 | 2022, 2025 |
| (Scotland) Huw Jones | 2 | 2023, 2025 |
| (Ireland) Hugo Keenan | 2 | 2022, 2023 |
| (Ireland) James Lowe | 2 | 2023, 2024 |
| (France) Damian Penaud | 2 | 2022, 2023 |
| (France) Thomas Ramos | 2 | 2024, 2026 |
| (Scotland) Finn Russell | 2 | 2024, 2026 |
| (Ireland) Johnny Sexton | 2 | 2021, 2023 |
| (Ireland) Josh van der Flier | 2 | 2022, 2023 |
| (Scotland) Duhan van der Merwe | 2 | 2021, 2024 |

=== Selections by nation ===
| Nation | 1st XV Selections | 2nd XV Selections |
|---|---|---|
| Ireland | 32 | 6 |
| France | 25 | 5 |
| Scotland | 12 | 4 |
| Wales | 8 | 0 |
| England | 7 | 0 |
| Italy | 6 | 0 |

== See also ==
- Six Nations Championship
- List of Six Nations Championship records
- List of Six Nations Championship hat-tricks
