= 2022 Six Nations Championship =

Rugby union competition in Europe

- Date: 5 February – 19 March 2022
- Countries: England; France; Ireland; Italy; Scotland; Wales

Tournament statistics
- Champions: France (18th title)
- Grand Slam: France (10th title)
- Triple Crown: Ireland (12th title)
- Matches played: 15
- Attendance: 964,370 (64,291 per match)
- Tries scored: 73 (4.87 per match)
- Top point scorer: (England) Marcus Smith (71 points)
- Top try scorers: (Ireland) James Lowe (France) Damian Penaud (France) Gabin Villière (3 tries)
- Player of the tournament: (France) Antoine Dupont

The 2022 Six Nations Championship (known as the Guinness Six Nations for sponsorship reasons) was the 23rd Six Nations Championship, the annual rugby union competition contested by the national teams of England, France, Ireland, Italy, Scotland, and Wales, and the 128th edition of the competition (including all its previous incarnations as the Home Nations Championship and Five Nations Championship). Wales entered the tournament as defending champions.

France won the Championship and the Grand Slam – both for the first time since 2010 – clinching the title with a 25–13 win over England at the Stade de France. Runners-up Ireland won the Triple Crown for the sixth time in the Six Nations era.

Italy came into the tournament on the back of 36 successive Six Nations losses since they beat Scotland, in 2015. Trailing 21–15 with less than two minutes remaining in their final game against Wales, Edoardo Padovani scored a try to win the match for Italy, ending a 40-match winless run in the Six Nations.

== Participants ==
Nation	Stadium			Head coach	Captain
Nation	Home stadium	Capacity	Location	Head coach	Captain
England	Twickenham Stadium	82,000	London	(Australia) Eddie Jones	Tom Curry, Courtney Lawes^{1}
France	Stade de France	81,338	Saint-Denis	(France) Fabien Galthié, Raphaël Ibañez ^{2}	Antoine Dupont
Ireland	Aviva Stadium	51,700	Dublin	(England) Andy Farrell	Johnny Sexton, James Ryan, Peter O'Mahony ^{3}
Italy	Stadio Olimpico	73,261	Rome	(New Zealand) Kieran Crowley	Michele Lamaro
Scotland	Murrayfield Stadium	67,144	Edinburgh	(Scotland) Gregor Townsend	Stuart Hogg
Wales	Millennium Stadium	73,931	Cardiff	(New Zealand) Wayne Pivac	Dan Biggar

^{1} Owen Farrell was originally named in the England squad as captain ahead of the Championship, but was later ruled out due to injury. Tom Curry captained the team for the first two matches, and Courtney Lawes was captain for the final three rounds.
^{2} Fabien Galthié tested positive for COVID-19 ahead of the opening round and Raphaël Ibañez took on the role for France's match against Italy.
^{3} Johnny Sexton was ruled out in round 2 and James Ryan captained in his absence. Ryan was not selected in round 3 and Peter O'Mahony was named as captain.

== Table ==
Pos	Team	Pld	W	D	L	PF	PA	PD	TF	TA	GS	TB	LB	Pts	FRA	IRE	ENG	SCO	WAL	ITA
1	France	5	5	0	0	141	73	+68	17	7	3	2	0	25	—	30–24	25–13			37–10
2	Ireland	5	4	0	1	168	63	+105	24	4	0	4	1	21		—		26–5	29–7	57–6
3	England	5	2	0	3	101	96	+5	8	11	0	1	1	10		15–32	—		23–19	
4	Scotland	5	2	0	3	92	121	−29	11	15	0	1	1	10	17–36		20–17	—		
5	Wales	5	1	0	4	76	104	−28	8	8	0	0	3	7	9–13			20–17	—	21–22
6	Italy	5	1	0	4	60	181	−121	5	27	0	0	0	4			0–33	22–33		—

Source: ESPN
Legend: Blue = home team win; Yellow = draw; Red = away team win.

Table ranking rules

- Four points are awarded for a win.
- Two points are awarded for a draw.
- A bonus point is awarded to a team that scores four or more tries, or loses by seven points or fewer. If a team scores four or more tries, and loses by seven points or fewer, they are awarded both bonus points.
- Three bonus points are awarded to a team that wins all five of their matches (a Grand Slam). This ensures that a Grand Slam winning team would top the table with at least 23 points, as another team could lose one match while winning two bonus points and win the other four matches while winning four bonus points for a maximum of 22 points.
- Tiebreakers
  - If two or more teams are tied on table points, the team with the better points difference (points scored less points conceded) is ranked higher.
  - If the above tiebreaker fails to separate tied teams, the team that scores the higher number of total tries (including penalty tries) in their matches is ranked higher.
  - If two or more teams remain tied after applying the above tiebreakers then those teams will be placed at equal rank; if the tournament has concluded and more than one team is placed first then the title will be shared between them.

== Fixtures ==
The tournament's fixtures were announced on 28 April 2021, and included a Friday night game – Wales hosting France in round 4 – for the first time since the opening match of the 2019 Six Nations Championship.

=== Round 1 ===
5 February 2022
14:15 WET (UTC+0)

(1 BP) Ireland	29–7	Wales
Try: Aki 3' c Conway (2) 44' c, 51' c Ringrose 60' m Con: Sexton (3/4) 5', 45', 53'; Pen: Sexton (1/3) 21'	Report	Try: Basham 75' c Con: Sheedy 76' (1/1)

Aviva Stadium, Dublin
Attendance: 51,700
Referee: Jaco Peyper (South Africa)

FB	15	Hugo Keenan
RW	14	Andrew Conway	(substituted off) 62'
OC	13	Garry Ringrose
IC	12	Bundee Aki
LW	11	Mack Hansen
FH	10	Johnny Sexton (c)	(substituted off) 64'
SH	9	Jamison Gibson-Park	(substituted off) 69'
N8	8	Jack Conan	(substituted off) 53'
OF	7	Josh van der Flier
BF	6	Caelan Doris
RL	5	James Ryan	(substituted off) 66'
LL	4	Tadhg Beirne
TP	3	Tadhg Furlong	(substituted off) 53'
HK	2	Rónan Kelleher	(substituted off) 62'
LP	1	Andrew Porter	(substituted off) 66'
Replacements:
HK	16	Dan Sheehan	(substituted on) 62'
PR	17	Cian Healy	(substituted on) 66'
PR	18	Finlay Bealham	(substituted on) 53'
LK	19	Ryan Baird	(substituted on) 66'
FL	20	Peter O'Mahony	(substituted on) 53'
SH	21	Conor Murray	(substituted on) 69'
FH	22	Joey Carbery	(substituted on) 64'
CE	23	James Hume	(substituted on) 62'
Coach:
Andy Farrell

FB	15	Liam Williams
RW	14	Johnny McNicholl		(substituted off) 62'
OC	13	Josh Adams	(yellow card) 48'
IC	12	Nick Tompkins
LW	11	Louis Rees-Zammit
FH	10	Dan Biggar (c)		(substituted off) 71'
SH	9	Tomos Williams		(substituted off) 57'
N8	8	Aaron Wainwright
OF	7	Taine Basham
BF	6	Ellis Jenkins		(substituted off) 53'
RL	5	Adam Beard
LL	4	Will Rowlands		(substituted off) 74'
TP	3	Tomas Francis		(substituted off) 53'
HK	2	Ryan Elias		(substituted off) 53'
LP	1	Wyn Jones		(substituted off) 53'
Replacements:
HK	16	Dewi Lake		(substituted on) 53'
PR	17	Gareth Thomas		(substituted on) 53'
PR	18	Dillon Lewis		(substituted on) 53'
LK	19	Ben Carter		(substituted on) 74'
N8	20	Ross Moriarty		(substituted on) 53'
SH	21	Gareth Davies		(substituted on) 57'
FH	22	Callum Sheedy		(substituted on) 71'
CE	23	Owen Watkin		(substituted on) 62'
Coach:
Wayne Pivac

Player of the Match:
Mack Hansen (Ireland)

Assistant referees:
Mathieu Raynal (France)
Angus Gardner (Australia)
Television match official:
Stuart Terheege (England)

Notes:

- Seb Davies (Wales) was originally named on the bench but was replaced by Ben Carter prior to kick-off due to a back spasm.
- Mack Hansen (Ireland) and Dewi Lake (Wales) made their international debuts.
- Ross Moriarty (Wales) earned his 50th test cap.

5 February 2022
16:45 GMT (UTC+0)

Scotland	20–17	England (1 BP)
Try: White 18' c Penalty try 66'; Con: Russell (1/1) 20'; Pen: Russell (2/2) 41', 72'	Report	Try: Smith 53' m Pen: Smith (4/4) 17', 34', 48', 63'

Murrayfield Stadium, Edinburgh
Attendance: 67,144
Referee: Ben O'Keeffe (New Zealand)

FB	15	Stuart Hogg (c)
RW	14	Darcy Graham
OC	13	Chris Harris
IC	12	Sam Johnson	(substituted off) 60'
LW	11	Duhan van der Merwe
FH	10	Finn Russell
SH	9	Ali Price	(substituted off) 12'	(substituted on) 24'	(substituted off) 63'
N8	8	Matt Fagerson
OF	7	Hamish Watson
BF	6	Jamie Ritchie	(substituted off) 60'
RL	5	Grant Gilchrist
LL	4	Jonny Gray	(substituted off) 63'
TP	3	Zander Fagerson	(substituted off) 52'
HK	2	George Turner	(substituted off) 52'
LP	1	Rory Sutherland	(substituted off) 52'
Replacements:
HK	16	Stuart McInally	(substituted on) 52'
PR	17	Pierre Schoeman	(substituted on) 52'
PR	18	WP Nel	(substituted on) 52'
LK	19	Sam Skinner	(substituted on) 63'
FL	20	Magnus Bradbury	(substituted on) 60'
SH	21	Ben White	(substituted on) 12'	(substituted off) 24'	(substituted on) 63'
FB	22	Blair Kinghorn
CE	23	Sione Tuipulotu	(substituted on) 60'
Coach:
Gregor Townsend

FB	15	Freddie Steward
RW	14	Max Malins
OC	13	Elliot Daly
IC	12	Henry Slade
LW	11	Joe Marchant		(substituted off) 80+1'
FH	10	Marcus Smith		(substituted off) 63'
SH	9	Ben Youngs
N8	8	Sam Simmonds		(substituted off) 70'	(substituted on) 77'
OF	7	Tom Curry (c)
BF	6	Lewis Ludlam		(substituted off) 63'
RL	5	Nick Isiekwe		(substituted off) 77'
LL	4	Maro Itoje
TP	3	Kyle Sinckler		(substituted off) 63'
HK	2	Luke Cowan-Dickie	(yellow card) 65'		(substituted off) 77'
LP	1	Ellis Genge		(substituted off) 63'
Replacements:
HK	16	Jamie George		(substituted on) 70'
PR	17	Joe Marler		(substituted on) 63'
PR	18	Will Stuart		(substituted on) 63'
LK	19	Charlie Ewels		(substituted on) 77'
N8	20	Alex Dombrandt		(substituted on) 63'
SH	21	Harry Randall
FH	22	George Ford		(substituted on) 63'
WG	23	Jack Nowell		(substituted on) 80+1'
Coach:
Eddie Jones

Player of the Match:
Matt Fagerson (Scotland)

Assistant referees:
Nic Berry (Australia)
Craig Evans (Wales)
Television match official:
Ben Whitehouse (Wales)

Notes:

- Ben White (Scotland) made his international debut.
- Scotland achieved back-to-back wins against England for the first time since 1984.
- Scotland retained the Calcutta Cup.
- Tom Curry became England's youngest captain since Will Carling against Australia in 1988.

6 February 2022
16:00 CET (UTC+1)

(1 BP) France	37–10	Italy
Try: Jelonch 26' m Villière (3) 40+1' c, 49' m, 80+2' c Penaud 68' c Con: Jaminet (2/4) 40+2', 70'; Ntamack (1/1) 80+3'; Pen: Jaminet (2/2) 5', 34'	Report	Try: Menoncello 17' c Con: Garbisi (1/1) 18'; Pen: Garbisi (1/1) 30'

Stade de France, Saint-Denis
Attendance: 78,750
Referee: Mike Adamson (Scotland)

FB	15	Melvyn Jaminet	(substituted off) 75'
RW	14	Damian Penaud
OC	13	Gaël Fickou
IC	12	Jonathan Danty	(substituted off) 58'
LW	11	Gabin Villière
FH	10	Romain Ntamack
SH	9	Antoine Dupont (c)	(substituted off) 70'
N8	8	Grégory Alldritt	(substituted off) 70'
OF	7	Dylan Cretin
BF	6	Anthony Jelonch
RL	5	Paul Willemse	(substituted off) 56'
LL	4	Cameron Woki
TP	3	Uini Atonio	(substituted off) 50'
HK	2	Julien Marchand	(substituted off) 58'
LP	1	Cyril Baille	(substituted off) 50'
Replacements:
HK	16	Peato Mauvaka	(substituted on) 58'
PR	17	Jean-Baptiste Gros	(substituted on) 50'
PR	18	Demba Bamba	(substituted on) 50'
LK	19	Romain Taofifénua	(substituted on) 56'
FL	20	François Cros	(substituted on) 70'
SH	21	Maxime Lucu	(substituted on) 70'
CE	22	Yoram Moefana	(substituted on) 58'
FB	23	Thomas Ramos	(substituted on) 75'
Caretaker coach:
Raphaël Ibañez

FB	15	Edoardo Padovani
RW	14	Tommaso Menoncello	(substituted off) 58'
OC	13	Ignacio Brex
IC	12	Marco Zanon
LW	11	Monty Ioane
FH	10	Paolo Garbisi
SH	9	Stephen Varney	(substituted off) 65'
N8	8	Toa Halafihi	(substituted off) 56'
OF	7	Michele Lamaro (c)
BF	6	Sebastian Negri	(substituted off) 70'
RL	5	Federico Ruzza		(substituted off) 65'
LL	4	Niccolò Cannone	(substituted off) 50'	(substituted on) 65'
TP	3	Tiziano Pasquali	(substituted off) 50'
HK	2	Gianmarco Lucchesi	(substituted off) 50'
LP	1	Danilo Fischetti	(substituted off) 50'
Replacements:
HK	16	Hame Faiva	(substituted on) 50'
PR	17	Ivan Nemer	(substituted on) 50'
PR	18	Giosuè Zilocchi	(substituted on) 50'
LK	19	Marco Fuser	(substituted on) 50'
FL	20	Giovanni Pettinelli	(substituted on) 56'
FL	21	Manuel Zuliani	(substituted on) 70'
SH	22	Callum Braley	(substituted on) 65'
FH	23	Leonardo Marin	(substituted on) 58'
Coach:
Kieran Crowley

Player of the Match:
Gabin Villière (France)

Assistant referees:
Nika Amashukeli (Georgia)
Damon Murphy (Australia)
Television match official:
Brett Cronan (Australia)

Notes:

- Toa Halafihi, Leonardo Marin, Tommaso Menoncello and Manuel Zuliani (all Italy) made their international debuts.
- France retained the Giuseppe Garibaldi Trophy.

=== Round 2 ===
12 February 2022
14:15 GMT (UTC+0)

Wales	20–17	Scotland (1 BP)
Try: Francis 32' m Pen: Biggar (4/5) 5', 8', 25', 58'; Drop: Biggar (1/1) 70'	Report	Try: Graham 12' m Pen: Russell (4/4) 16', 20', 29', 50'

Millennium Stadium, Cardiff
Attendance: 73,782
Referee: Nic Berry (Australia)

FB	15	Liam Williams
RW	14	Alex Cuthbert
OC	13	Owen Watkin
IC	12	Nick Tompkins	(substituted off) 68'
LW	11	Louis Rees-Zammit
FH	10	Dan Biggar (c)	(substituted off) 79'
SH	9	Tomos Williams
N8	8	Ross Moriarty	(substituted off) 58'
OF	7	Jac Morgan
BF	6	Taine Basham
RL	5	Adam Beard
LL	4	Will Rowlands	(substituted off) 76'
TP	3	Tomas Francis	(substituted off) 60'
HK	2	Ryan Elias	(substituted off) 65'
LP	1	Wyn Jones	(substituted off) 65'
Replacements:
HK	16	Dewi Lake	(substituted on) 65'
PR	17	Gareth Thomas	(substituted on) 65'
PR	18	Dillon Lewis	(substituted on) 60'
LK	19	Seb Davies	(substituted on) 76'
FL	20	Aaron Wainwright	(substituted on) 58'
SH	21	Gareth Davies
FH	22	Callum Sheedy	(substituted on) 79'
CE	23	Jonathan Davies	(substituted on) 68'
Coach:
Wayne Pivac

FB	15	Stuart Hogg (c)
RW	14	Darcy Graham
OC	13	Chris Harris
IC	12	Sione Tuipulotu		(substituted off) 71'
LW	11	Duhan van der Merwe		(substituted off) 79'
FH	10	Finn Russell	(yellow card) 68'
SH	9	Ali Price		(substituted off) 63'
N8	8	Matt Fagerson		(substituted off) 32'
OF	7	Hamish Watson
BF	6	Sam Skinner
RL	5	Grant Gilchrist
LL	4	Jonny Gray		(substituted off) 63'
TP	3	WP Nel		(substituted off) 45'
HK	2	Stuart McInally		(substituted off) 45'
LP	1	Pierre Schoeman		(substituted off) 45'	(substituted on) 63'
Replacements:
HK	16	George Turner		(substituted on) 45'
PR	17	Rory Sutherland		(substituted on) 45'	(substituted off) 63'
PR	18	Zander Fagerson		(substituted on) 45'
FL	19	Magnus Bradbury		(substituted on) 32'
FL	20	Rory Darge		(substituted on) 63'
SH	21	Ben White		(substituted on) 63'
FB	22	Blair Kinghorn		(substituted on) 71'
CE	23	Cameron Redpath		(substituted on) 79'
Coach:
Gregor Townsend

Player of the Match:
Ryan Elias (Wales)

Assistant referees:
Wayne Barnes (England)
Chris Busby (Ireland)
Television match official:
Brett Cronan (Australia)

Notes

- Wales retained the Doddie Weir Cup.
- Jac Morgan (Wales) and Rory Darge (Scotland) made their international debuts.
- Dan Biggar and Jonathan Davies (both Wales) won their 100th test caps, including caps for the British & Irish Lions.

12 February 2022
17:45 CET (UTC+1)

France	30–24	Ireland (1 BP)
Try: Dupont 2' c Baille 54' m Con: Jaminet (1/2) 3'; Pen: Jaminet (6/6) 7', 17', 36', 41', 44', 79'	Report	Try: Hansen 7' c Van der Flier 45' c Gibson-Park 49' c Con: Carbery (3/3) 9', 46', 50'; Pen: Carbery 73'

Stade de France, Saint-Denis
Attendance: 80,000
Referee: Angus Gardner (Australia)

FB	15	Melvyn Jaminet
RW	14	Damian Penaud
OC	13	Gaël Fickou
IC	12	Yoram Moefana
LW	11	Gabin Villière
FH	10	Romain Ntamack
SH	9	Antoine Dupont (c)	(substituted off) 70'
N8	8	Grégory Alldritt
OF	7	Anthony Jelonch
BF	6	François Cros	(substituted off) 73'
RL	5	Paul Willemse	(substituted off) 53'
LL	4	Cameron Woki	(substituted off) 53'
TP	3	Uini Atonio	(substituted off) 55'
HK	2	Julien Marchand	(substituted off) 55'
LP	1	Cyril Baille	(substituted off) 55'
Replacements:
HK	16	Peato Mauvaka	(substituted on) 55'
PR	17	Jean-Baptiste Gros	(substituted on) 55'
PR	18	Demba Bamba	(substituted on) 55'
LK	19	Romain Taofifénua	(substituted on) 53'
LK	20	Thibaud Flament	(substituted on) 53'
FL	21	Dylan Cretin	(substituted on) 73'
SH	22	Maxime Lucu	(substituted on) 70'
FB	23	Thomas Ramos
Coach:
Fabien Galthié

FB	15	Hugo Keenan
RW	14	Andrew Conway
OC	13	Garry Ringrose
IC	12	Bundee Aki	(substituted off) 64'
LW	11	Mack Hansen
FH	10	Joey Carbery	(substituted off) 79'
SH	9	Jamison Gibson-Park	(substituted off) 64'
N8	8	Jack Conan	(substituted off) 53'
OF	7	Josh van der Flier
BF	6	Caelan Doris
RL	5	James Ryan (c)
LL	4	Tadhg Beirne
TP	3	Tadhg Furlong	(substituted off) 73'
HK	2	Rónan Kelleher	(substituted off) 26'
LP	1	Andrew Porter	(substituted off) 73'
Replacements:
HK	16	Dan Sheehan	(substituted on) 26'
PR	17	Cian Healy	(substituted on) 73'
PR	18	Finlay Bealham	(substituted on) 73'
LK	19	Iain Henderson		(substituted on) 58'
FL	20	Peter O'Mahony	(substituted on) 53'	(substituted off) 58'
SH	21	Conor Murray	(substituted on) 64'
FH	22	Jack Carty	(substituted on) 79'
CE	23	Robbie Henshaw	(substituted on) 64'
Coach:
Andy Farrell

Player of the Match:
Grégory Alldritt (France)

Assistant referees:
Ben O'Keeffe (New Zealand)
Craig Evans (Wales)
Television match official:
Ben Whitehouse (Wales)

13 February 2022
16:00 CET (UTC+1)

Italy	0–33	England (1 BP)
	Report	Try: Smith 10' c George (2) 20' c, 40' c Daly 45' m Sinckler 73' c Con: Smith (4/5) 12', 21', 40+2', 74'

Stadio Olimpico, Rome
Attendance: 29,015
Referee: Damon Murphy (Australia)

FB	15	Edoardo Padovani
RW	14	Federico Mori	(substituted off) 55'
OC	13	Ignacio Brex
IC	12	Marco Zanon
LW	11	Monty Ioane
FH	10	Paolo Garbisi
SH	9	Stephen Varney	(substituted off) 65'
N8	8	Toa Halafihi	(substituted off) 38'
OF	7	Michele Lamaro (c)
BF	6	Braam Steyn
RL	5	Federico Ruzza	(substituted off) 72'
LL	4	Niccolò Cannone
TP	3	Pietro Ceccarelli	(substituted off) 40'
HK	2	Gianmarco Lucchesi	(substituted off) 52'
LP	1	Danilo Fischetti	(substituted off) 46'
Replacements:
HK	16	Hame Faiva	(substituted on) 52'
PR	17	Cherif Traorè	(substituted on) 46'
PR	18	Tiziano Pasquali	(substituted on) 40'
LK	19	Andrea Zambonin	(substituted on) 72'
FL	20	Sebastian Negri	(substituted on) 38'	(substituted off) 55'
FL	21	Giovanni Pettinelli		(substituted on) 55'
SH	22	Alessandro Fusco	(substituted on) 65'
FH	23	Leonardo Marin	(substituted on) 55'
Coach:
Kieran Crowley

FB	15	Freddie Steward
RW	14	Max Malins
OC	13	Joe Marchant	(substituted off) 74'
IC	12	Henry Slade
LW	11	Jack Nowell	(substituted off) 17'
FH	10	Marcus Smith
SH	9	Harry Randall	(substituted off) 55'
N8	8	Alex Dombrandt
OF	7	Tom Curry (c)	(substituted off) 65'
BF	6	Maro Itoje
RL	5	Nick Isiekwe	(substituted off) 55'
LL	4	Charlie Ewels
TP	3	Will Stuart	(substituted off) 40'
HK	2	Jamie George	(substituted off) 56'
LP	1	Ellis Genge	(substituted off) 65'
Replacements:
HK	16	Luke Cowan-Dickie	(substituted on) 56'
PR	17	Joe Marler	(substituted on) 65'
PR	18	Kyle Sinckler	(substituted on) 40'
LK	19	Ollie Chessum	(substituted on) 65'
N8	20	Sam Simmonds	(substituted on) 55'
SH	21	Ben Youngs	(substituted on) 55'
FH	22	George Ford	(substituted on) 74'
WG	23	Elliot Daly	(substituted on) 17'
Coach:
Eddie Jones

Player of the Match:
Marcus Smith (England)

Assistant referees:
Andrew Brace (Ireland)
Pierre Brousset (France)
Television match official:
Brian MacNiece (Ireland)

Notes:

- Andrea Zambonin (Italy) and Ollie Chessum (England) made their international debuts.
- Ben Youngs made his 114th appearance for England, equalling Jason Leonard's record as England's most-capped player.
- England kept a clean sheet against Italy in the Six Nations for the first time.

=== Round 3 ===
26 February 2022
14:15 GMT (UTC+0)

Scotland	17–36	France (1 BP)
Try: Darge 29' c Van der Merwe 80' c Con: Russell (1/1) 30'; Hogg (1/1) 80'; Pen: Russell (1/1) 11'	Report	Try: Willemse 8' c Moefana 13' m Fickou 40+2' c Danty 42' c Penaud (2) 59' m, 74' m Con: Jaminet (3/6) 9', 40+4', 44'

Murrayfield Stadium, Edinburgh
Attendance: 67,144
Referee: Karl Dickson (England)

FB	15	Stuart Hogg (c)
RW	14	Darcy Graham
OC	13	Chris Harris	(substituted off) 40'
IC	12	Sione Tuipulotu
LW	11	Duhan van der Merwe
FH	10	Finn Russell	(substituted off) 61'
SH	9	Ali Price	(substituted off) 48'	(substituted on) 58'	(substituted off) 69'
N8	8	Magnus Bradbury
OF	7	Rory Darge
BF	6	Nick Haining	(substituted off) 44'
RL	5	Grant Gilchrist	(substituted off) 61'
LL	4	Sam Skinner
TP	3	Zander Fagerson	(substituted off) 56'
HK	2	Stuart McInally	(substituted off) 56'
LP	1	Pierre Schoeman	(substituted off) 61'
Replacements:
HK	16	George Turner	(substituted on) 56'
PR	17	Oli Kebble	(substituted on) 61'
PR	18	WP Nel	(substituted on) 56'
LK	19	Jamie Hodgson	(substituted on) 61'
FL	20	Andy Christie	(substituted on) 44'
SH	21	Ben White	(substituted on) 48'	(substituted off) 58'	(substituted on) 69'
FB	22	Blair Kinghorn	(substituted on) 61'
CE	23	Mark Bennett	(substituted on) 40'
Coach:
Gregor Townsend

FB	15	Melvyn Jaminet	(substituted off) 71'
RW	14	Damian Penaud
OC	13	Gaël Fickou
IC	12	Jonathan Danty
LW	11	Yoram Moefana
FH	10	Romain Ntamack
SH	9	Antoine Dupont (c)	(substituted off) 74'
N8	8	Grégory Alldritt
OF	7	Anthony Jelonch	(substituted off) 54'
BF	6	François Cros
RL	5	Paul Willemse	(substituted off) 54'
LL	4	Cameron Woki	(substituted off) 68'
TP	3	Uini Atonio	(substituted off) 47'
HK	2	Julien Marchand	(substituted off) 54'
LP	1	Cyril Baille	(substituted off) 58'
Replacements:
HK	16	Peato Mauvaka	(substituted on) 54'
PR	17	Jean-Baptiste Gros	(substituted on) 58'
PR	18	Demba Bamba	(substituted on) 47'
LK	19	Romain Taofifénua	(substituted on) 54'
LK	20	Thibaud Flament	(substituted on) 54'
FL	21	Dylan Cretin	(substituted on) 68'
SH	22	Maxime Lucu	(substituted on) 74'
FB	23	Thomas Ramos	(substituted on) 71'
Coach:
Fabien Galthié

Player of the Match:
Antoine Dupont (France)

Assistant referees:
Luke Pearce (England)
Chris Busby (Ireland)
Television match official:
Tom Foley (England)

Notes:

- Hamish Watson (Scotland) was originally named to start, but was forced to withdraw the day before the match after testing positive for COVID-19. He was replaced by Nick Haining, whose place on the bench was taken by Andy Christie.
- Andy Christie (Scotland) made his international debut.
- France reclaimed the Auld Alliance Trophy, having lost it in 2020.

26 February 2022
16:45 GMT (UTC+0)

England	23–19	Wales (1 BP)
Try: Dombrandt 43' m Pen: Smith (6/7) 3', 6', 31', 40+2', 68', 72'	Report	Try: Adams 54' m Tompkins 61' c Hardy 80' c Con: Biggar (2/3) 61', 80'

Twickenham Stadium, London
Attendance: 81,621
Referee: Mike Adamson (Scotland)

FB	15	Freddie Steward
RW	14	Max Malins
OC	13	Elliot Daly	(substituted off) 74'
IC	12	Henry Slade
LW	11	Jack Nowell
FH	10	Marcus Smith
SH	9	Harry Randall	(substituted off) 62'
N8	8	Alex Dombrandt
OF	7	Tom Curry	(substituted off) 40'
BF	6	Courtney Lawes (c)
RL	5	Maro Itoje
LL	4	Charlie Ewels	(substituted off) 68'
TP	3	Kyle Sinckler	(substituted off) 68'
HK	2	Luke Cowan-Dickie	(substituted off) 25'
LP	1	Ellis Genge	(substituted off) 72'
Replacements:
HK	16	Jamie George	(substituted on) 25'
PR	17	Joe Marler	(substituted on) 72'
PR	18	Will Stuart	(substituted on) 68'
LK	19	Nick Isiekwe	(substituted on) 68'
N8	20	Sam Simmonds	(substituted on) 40'
SH	21	Ben Youngs	(substituted on) 62'
FH	22	George Ford
CE	23	Joe Marchant	(substituted on) 74'
Coach:
Eddie Jones

FB	15	Liam Williams	(yellow card) 20'	(substituted off) 71'	(substituted on) 78'
RW	14	Alex Cuthbert
OC	13	Owen Watkin		(substituted off) 20'	(substituted on) 24'	(substituted off) 65'
IC	12	Nick Tompkins
LW	11	Josh Adams			(substituted off) 78'
FH	10	Dan Biggar (c)
SH	9	Tomos Williams		(substituted off) 68'
N8	8	Taulupe Faletau
OF	7	Taine Basham		(substituted off) 55'
BF	6	Ross Moriarty		(substituted off) 70'
RL	5	Adam Beard
LL	4	Will Rowlands
TP	3	Tomas Francis		(substituted off) 20'	(substituted on) 28'	(substituted off) 55'
HK	2	Ryan Elias		(substituted off) 68'
LP	1	Wyn Jones		(substituted off) 44'
Replacements:
HK	16	Dewi Lake		(substituted on) 68'
PR	17	Gareth Thomas		(substituted on) 44'
PR	18	Leon Brown		(substituted on) 20'	(substituted off) 28'	(substituted on) 55'
LK	19	Seb Davies		(substituted on) 70'
FL	20	Jac Morgan		(substituted on) 55'
SH	21	Kieran Hardy		(substituted on) 68'
FH	22	Gareth Anscombe		(substituted on) 71'
CE	23	Jonathan Davies		(substituted on) 20'	(substituted off) 24'	(substituted on) 65'
Coach:
Wayne Pivac

Player of the Match:
Marcus Smith (England)

Assistant referees:
Mathieu Raynal (France)
Frank Murphy (Ireland)
Television match official:
Brian MacNiece (Ireland)

Notes:

- Manu Tuilagi (England) was originally named to start, but was forced to withdraw due to injury. His place in the starting line-up was taken by Elliot Daly, who was replaced on the bench by Joe Marchant.
- Ben Youngs made his 115th appearance for England to surpass Jason Leonard's record as England's most capped international player.
- Kyle Sinckler (England) and Alex Cuthbert (Wales) earned their 50th test caps.
- Courtney Lawes (England) and Dan Biggar (Wales) became the sixth club mates (Northampton Saints) in the history of the Championship to captain their countries against each other.

27 February 2022
15:00 WET (UTC+0)

(1 BP) Ireland	57–6	Italy
Try: Carbery 4' c Gibson-Park 21' c Lowry (2) 30' m, 57' c O'Mahony 38' m Lowe (2) 52' m, 76' c Baird 70' c Treadwell 80+2' c Con: Carbery (2/5) 5', 22'; Sexton (4/4) 58', 71', 77', 80+3'	Report	Pen: Padovani (1/1) 14'; Garbisi (1/1) 40+1'

Aviva Stadium, Dublin
Attendance: 51,000
Referee: Nika Amashukeli (Georgia)

FB	15	Michael Lowry
RW	14	Mack Hansen
OC	13	Garry Ringrose	3' to 9'		(substituted off) 53'	(substituted on) 68'
IC	12	Robbie Henshaw				(substituted off) 68'
LW	11	James Lowe
FH	10	Joey Carbery	(substituted off) 53'
SH	9	Jamison Gibson-Park	(substituted off) 62'
N8	8	Caelan Doris	(substituted off) 54'
OF	7	Josh van der Flier
BF	6	Peter O'Mahony (c)
RL	5	Ryan Baird
LL	4	Tadhg Beirne	(substituted off) 62'
TP	3	Tadhg Furlong	(substituted off) 62'
HK	2	Dan Sheehan	(substituted off) 69'
LP	1	Andrew Porter	(substituted off) 44'
Replacements:
HK	16	Rob Herring	(substituted on) 69'
PR	17	Dave Kilcoyne	(substituted on) 44'
PR	18	Finlay Bealham	(substituted on) 62'
LK	19	Kieran Treadwell	(substituted on) 62'
N8	20	Jack Conan	(substituted on) 54'
SH	21	Craig Casey	(substituted on) 62'
FH	22	Johnny Sexton	(substituted on) 53'
CE	23	James Hume	(substituted on) 3'	(substituted off) 9'	(substituted on) 53'
Coach:
Andy Farrell

FB	15	Edoardo Padovani
RW	14	Pierre Bruno		(substituted off) 20'
OC	13	Ignacio Brex
IC	12	Leonardo Marin		(substituted off) 66'	(substituted on) 78'
LW	11	Monty Ioane
FH	10	Paolo Garbisi			(substituted off) 78'
SH	9	Stephen Varney		(substituted off) 40'
N8	8	Toa Halafihi		(substituted off) 20'
OF	7	Michele Lamaro (c)			(substituted off) 62'	(substituted on) 78'
BF	6	Giovanni Pettinelli		(substituted off) 54'	(substituted on) 62'	(substituted off) 78'
RL	5	Federico Ruzza		(substituted off) 68'
LL	4	Niccolò Cannone		(substituted off) 49'
TP	3	Pietro Ceccarelli		(substituted off) 40'
HK	2	Gianmarco Lucchesi		(substituted off) 9'
LP	1	Danilo Fischetti
Replacements:
HK	16	Hame Faiva	(red card) 18'	(substituted on) 9'
PR	17	Ivan Nemer		(substituted on) 20'
PR	18	Tiziano Pasquali		(substituted on) 40'
LK	19	David Sisi		(substituted on) 68'
FL	20	Manuel Zuliani		(substituted on) 49'
N8	21	Braam Steyn	(yellow card) 74'	(substituted on) 54'
SH	22	Alessandro Fusco		(substituted on) 40'
CE	23	Marco Zanon		(substituted on) 66'
Coach:
Kieran Crowley

Player of the Match:
Josh van der Flier (Ireland)

Assistant referees:
Matthew Carley (England)
Christophe Ridley (England)
Television match official:
Eric Gauzins (France)

Notes:

- Michael Lowry (Ireland) made his international debut.
- Italy played with 13 players from the 19th minute of the match due to World Rugby Law 3.20, which requires a team that is unable to continue with contested scrums as a result of a player being sent off to lose an additional player. This meant that no replacement was made for Toa Halafihi.
- Italy suffered their 100th defeat in the Six Nations Championship.
- Referee Nika Amashukeli became the first Georgian and Tier 2 union official to referee in this Six Nations Championship.

=== Round 4 ===
11 March 2022
20:00 GMT (UTC+0)

(1 BP) Wales	9–13	France
Pen: Biggar (3/3) 5', 17', 39'	Report	Try: Jelonch 9' c Con: Jaminet (1/1) 10'; Pen: Jaminet (2/3) 3', 47'

Millennium Stadium, Cardiff
Attendance: 63,208
Referee: Matthew Carley (England)

FB	15	Liam Williams	(substituted off) 67'
RW	14	Alex Cuthbert
OC	13	Owen Watkin
IC	12	Jonathan Davies	(substituted off) 65'
LW	11	Josh Adams
FH	10	Dan Biggar (c)
SH	9	Tomos Williams	(substituted off) 11'
N8	8	Taulupe Faletau
OF	7	Josh Navidi	(substituted off) 76'
BF	6	Seb Davies	(substituted off) 62'
RL	5	Adam Beard
LL	4	Will Rowlands
TP	3	Tomas Francis	(substituted off) 60'
HK	2	Ryan Elias	(substituted off) 55'
LP	1	Gareth Thomas	(substituted off) 20'	(substituted on) 33'	(substituted off) 67'
Replacements:
HK	16	Dewi Lake	(substituted on) 55'
PR	17	Wyn Jones	(substituted on) 20'	(substituted off) 33'	(substituted on) 67'
PR	18	Dillon Lewis	(substituted on) 60'
FL	19	Ross Moriarty	(substituted on) 62'
FL	20	Jac Morgan	(substituted on) 76'
SH	21	Kieran Hardy	(substituted on) 11'
FH	22	Gareth Anscombe	(substituted on) 67'
WG	23	Louis Rees-Zammit	(substituted on) 65'
Coach:
Wayne Pivac

FB	15	Melvyn Jaminet
RW	14	Yoram Moefana
OC	13	Gaël Fickou
IC	12	Jonathan Danty	(substituted off) 80'
LW	11	Gabin Villière
FH	10	Romain Ntamack
SH	9	Antoine Dupont (c)	(substituted off) 72'
N8	8	Grégory Alldritt	(substituted off) 65'
OF	7	Anthony Jelonch
BF	6	François Cros
RL	5	Paul Willemse
LL	4	Cameron Woki	(substituted off) 65'
TP	3	Uini Atonio	(substituted off) 40'
HK	2	Julien Marchand	(substituted off) 53'
LP	1	Cyril Baille	(substituted off) 53'
Replacements:
HK	16	Peato Mauvaka	(substituted on) 53'
PR	17	Jean-Baptiste Gros	(substituted on) 53'
PR	18	Mohamed Haouas	(substituted on) 40'
LK	19	Thibaud Flament	(substituted on) 65'
FL	20	Dylan Cretin	(substituted on) 65'
SH	21	Maxime Lucu	(substituted on) 72'
FB	22	Thomas Ramos
WG	23	Matthis Lebel	(substituted on) 80'
Coach:
Fabien Galthié

Player of the Match:
Julien Marchand (France)

Assistant referees:
Jaco Peyper (South Africa)
Andrea Piardi (Italy)
Television match official:
Tom Foley (England)

12 March 2022
15:15 CET (UTC+1)

Italy	22–33	Scotland (1 BP)
Try: Braley 30' c Capuozzo (2) 66' c, 80+3' m Con: Garbisi (2/3) 31', 67'; Pen: Garbisi (1/3) 4'	Report	Try: Johnson 18' m Harris (2) 22' c, 37' c Graham 48' c Hogg 61' c Con: Russell (4/5) 23', 38', 49', 62'

Stadio Olimpico, Rome
Attendance: 41,214
Referee: Luke Pearce (England)

FB	15	Edoardo Padovani			(substituted off) 67'
RW	14	Pierre Bruno	(substituted off) 46'
OC	13	Ignacio Brex	(substituted off) 35'	(substituted on) 40'
IC	12	Leonardo Marin
LW	11	Monty Ioane
FH	10	Paolo Garbisi
SH	9	Callum Braley	(substituted off) 52'
N8	8	Toa Halafihi
OF	7	Michele Lamaro (c)	(substituted off) 16'	(substituted on) 23'
BF	6	Giovanni Pettinelli			(substituted off) 72'
RL	5	Federico Ruzza
LL	4	Niccolò Cannone	(substituted off) 54'
TP	3	Pietro Ceccarelli	(substituted off) 52'
HK	2	Giacomo Nicotera	(substituted off) 52'
LP	1	Danilo Fischetti	(substituted off) 52'
Replacements:
HK	16	Luca Bigi	(substituted on) 52'
PR	17	Ivan Nemer	(substituted on) 52'
PR	18	Tiziano Pasquali	(substituted on) 52'
LK	19	David Sisi	(substituted on) 54'
FL	20	Braam Steyn	(substituted on) 16'	(substituted off) 23'	(substituted on) 72'
SH	21	Alessandro Fusco	(substituted on) 52'
CE	22	Marco Zanon	(substituted on) 35'	(substituted off) 40'	(substituted on) 67'
FB	23	Ange Capuozzo	(substituted on) 46'
Coach:
Kieran Crowley

FB	15	Stuart Hogg (c)
RW	14	Darcy Graham
OC	13	Chris Harris
IC	12	Sam Johnson	(substituted off) 76'
LW	11	Kyle Steyn
FH	10	Finn Russell	(substituted off) 76'
SH	9	Ali Price	(substituted off) 76'
N8	8	Matt Fagerson	(substituted off) 63'
OF	7	Hamish Watson
BF	6	Rory Darge
RL	5	Grant Gilchrist
LL	4	Sam Skinner	(substituted off) 76'
TP	3	Zander Fagerson	(substituted off) 60'
HK	2	George Turner	(substituted off) 60'
LP	1	Pierre Schoeman	(substituted off) 60'
Replacements:
HK	16	Stuart McInally	(substituted on) 60'
PR	17	Allan Dell	(substituted on) 60'
PR	18	WP Nel	(substituted on) 60'
LK	19	Jamie Hodgson	(substituted on) 76'
FL	20	Magnus Bradbury	(substituted on) 63'
SH	21	Ben Vellacott	(substituted on) 76'
FH	22	Adam Hastings	(substituted on) 76'
CE	23	Sione Tuipulotu	(substituted on) 76'
Coach:
Gregor Townsend

Player of the Match:
Ali Price (Scotland)

Assistant referees:
Andrew Brace (Ireland)
Craig Evans (Wales)
Television match official:
Stuart Terheege (England)

Notes:

- Ben Vellacott (Scotland) and Ange Capuozzo (Italy) made their international debuts.
- Ali Price (Scotland) earned his 50th test cap.
- Giosuè Zilocchi and Manuel Zuliani (Italy) were originally named on the bench, but were later replaced by Tiziano Pasquali and Braam Steyn.
- Scotland won the inaugural Cuttitta Cup.

12 March 2022
16:45 GMT (UTC+0)

England	15–32	Ireland (1 BP)
Pen: Smith (5/6) 18', 33', 40+1', 53', 61'	Report	Try: Lowe 6' m Keenan 37' c Conan 72' c Bealham 76' c Con: Sexton (3/4) 39', 74', 78'; Pen: Sexton (2/2) 3', 66'

Twickenham Stadium, London
Attendance: 81,658
Referee: Mathieu Raynal (France)

FB	15	Freddie Steward		(substituted off) 80'
RW	14	Max Malins
OC	13	Joe Marchant		(substituted off) 70'
IC	12	Henry Slade
LW	11	Jack Nowell
FH	10	Marcus Smith
SH	9	Harry Randall		(substituted off) 53'
N8	8	Sam Simmonds
OF	7	Tom Curry		(substituted off) 15'
BF	6	Courtney Lawes (c)
RL	5	Charlie Ewels	(red card) 2'
LL	4	Maro Itoje
TP	3	Kyle Sinckler		(substituted off) 39'
HK	2	Jamie George		(substituted off) 80'
LP	1	Ellis Genge		(substituted off) 67'
Replacements:
HK	16	Jamie Blamire		(substituted on) 80'
PR	17	Joe Marler		(substituted on) 67'
PR	18	Will Stuart		(substituted on) 39'
LK	19	Joe Launchbury			(substituted on) 67'
N8	20	Alex Dombrandt		(substituted on) 15'	(substituted off) 67'
SH	21	Ben Youngs		(substituted on) 53'
FH	22	George Ford		(substituted on) 80'
CE	23	Elliot Daly		(substituted on) 70'
Coach:
Eddie Jones

FB	15	Hugo Keenan
RW	14	Andrew Conway
OC	13	Garry Ringrose
IC	12	Bundee Aki	(substituted off) 66'
LW	11	James Lowe
FH	10	Johnny Sexton (c)	(substituted off) 80'
SH	9	Jamison Gibson-Park	(substituted off) 68'
N8	8	Caelan Doris
OF	7	Josh van der Flier
BF	6	Peter O'Mahony	(substituted off) 61'
RL	5	James Ryan	(substituted off) 2'
LL	4	Tadhg Beirne
TP	3	Tadhg Furlong	(substituted off) 74'
HK	2	Dan Sheehan	(substituted off) 53'
LP	1	Cian Healy	(substituted off) 53'
Replacements:
HK	16	Rob Herring	(substituted on) 53'
PR	17	Dave Kilcoyne	(substituted on) 53'
PR	18	Finlay Bealham	(substituted on) 74'
LK	19	Iain Henderson	(substituted on) 2'
N8	20	Jack Conan	(substituted on) 61'
SH	21	Conor Murray	(substituted on) 68'
FH	22	Joey Carbery	(substituted on) 80'
CE	23	Robbie Henshaw	(substituted on) 66'
Coach:
Andy Farrell

Player of the Match:
Jamison Gibson-Park (Ireland)

Assistant referees:
Mike Adamson (Scotland)
Pierre Brousset (France)
Television match official:
Marius Jonker (South Africa)

Notes

- Ireland retain the Millennium Trophy.
- This was Ireland's biggest win over England at Twickenham since 1964, surpassing the 13-point margin in 1964.
- Charlie Ewels' red card was the quickest to be given (at 82 seconds) in Championship history.

=== Round 5 ===
19 March 2022
14:15 GMT (UTC+0)

(1 BP) Wales	21–22	Italy
Try: Watkin 27' c Lake 51' c Adams 68' c Con: Biggar (3/3) 27', 52', 68'	Report	Try: Padovani 79’ c Con: Garbisi (1/1) 80’ Pen: Garbisi (3/3) 12', 31', 56'; Padovani (2/3) 15', 33'

Millennium Stadium, Cardiff
Attendance: 67,134
Referee: Andrew Brace (Ireland)

FB	15	Johnny McNicholl	(substituted off) 59'
RW	14	Louis Rees-Zammit
OC	13	Owen Watkin
IC	12	Willis Halaholo	(substituted off) 46'
LW	11	Josh Adams
FH	10	Dan Biggar (c)
SH	9	Gareth Davies	(substituted off) 66'
N8	8	Taulupe Faletau
OF	7	Josh Navidi
BF	6	Seb Davies	(substituted off) 49'
RL	5	Alun Wyn Jones	(substituted off) 59'
LL	4	Adam Beard
TP	3	Dillon Lewis	(substituted off) 40'
HK	2	Dewi Lake	(substituted off) 75'
LP	1	Gareth Thomas	(substituted off) 59'
Replacements:
HK	16	Bradley Roberts	(substituted on) 75'
PR	17	Wyn Jones	(substituted on) 59'
PR	18	Leon Brown	(substituted on) 40'
LK	19	Will Rowlands	(substituted on) 59'
N8	20	Ross Moriarty	(substituted on) 49'
SH	21	Kieran Hardy	(substituted on) 66'
FH	22	Callum Sheedy	(substituted on) 59'
CE	23	Nick Tompkins	(substituted on) 46'
Coach:
Wayne Pivac

FB	15	Ange Capuozzo
RW	14	Edoardo Padovani
OC	13	Ignacio Brex
IC	12	Leonardo Marin	(substituted off) 52'
LW	11	Monty Ioane
FH	10	Paolo Garbisi
SH	9	Callum Braley	(substituted off) 59'
N8	8	Toa Halafihi	(substituted off) 63'
OF	7	Michele Lamaro (c)
BF	6	Giovanni Pettinelli	(substituted off) 74'
RL	5	Federico Ruzza
LL	4	Marco Fuser	(substituted off) 47'
TP	3	Pietro Ceccarelli	(substituted off) 52'
HK	2	Giacomo Nicotera	(substituted off) 52'
LP	1	Danilo Fischetti	(substituted off) 69'
Replacements:
HK	16	Luca Bigi	(substituted on) 52'
PR	17	Cherif Traorè	(substituted on) 69'
PR	18	Filippo Alongi	(substituted on) 52'
LK	19	David Sisi	(substituted on) 74'
LK	20	Niccolò Cannone	(substituted on) 47'
N8	21	Braam Steyn	(substituted on) 63'
SH	22	Alessandro Fusco	(substituted on) 59'
CE	23	Marco Zanon	(substituted on) 52'
Coach:
Kieran Crowley

Player of the Match:
Josh Adams (Wales) (Note: Despite being formally named Player of the Match by the host broadcaster, Adams gave his medal to Ange Capuozzo after the game.)

Assistant referees:
Matthew Carley (England)
Tual Trainini (France)
Television match official:
Joy Neville (Ireland)

Notes:

- Alun Wyn Jones (Wales) made his 150th appearance, the first player to achieve this.
- Dan Biggar (Wales) became the seventh Welshman to earn his 100th test cap.
- Braam Steyn (Italy) earned his 50th test cap.
- Tiziano Pasquali (Italy) had been named on the bench but withdrew ahead of the game and replaced by Filippo Alongi.
- Filippo Alongi (Italy) made his international debut.
- Italy won in the Six Nations Championship for the first time since their victory over Scotland in Edinburgh in 2015 (19–22), ending a 36–match losing streak in the Championship.
- Italy defeated Wales for the first time since 2007, and achieved their first away victory against Wales.
- Italy won against a Tier 1 nation for the first time since their victory over South Africa in 2016 (20–18).

19 March 2022
16:45 WET (UTC+0)

(1 BP) Ireland	26–5	Scotland
Try: Sheehan 16' c Healy 27' c Van der Flier 59' c Murray 78' m Con: Sexton (3/4) 18', 28', 59'	Report	Try: Schoeman 34' m

Aviva Stadium, Dublin
Attendance: 51,000
Referee: Wayne Barnes (England)

FB	15	Hugo Keenan	(substituted off) 73'
RW	14	Mack Hansen
OC	13	Garry Ringrose
IC	12	Bundee Aki	(substituted off) 55'
LW	11	James Lowe
FH	10	Johnny Sexton (c)
SH	9	Jamison Gibson-Park	(substituted off) 66'
N8	8	Jack Conan	(substituted off) 51'
OF	7	Josh van der Flier
BF	6	Caelan Doris
RL	5	Iain Henderson	(substituted off) 62'
LL	4	Tadhg Beirne	(substituted off) 67'
TP	3	Tadhg Furlong
HK	2	Dan Sheehan	(substituted off) 62'
LP	1	Cian Healy	(substituted off) 51'
Replacements:
HK	16	Rob Herring	(substituted on) 62'
PR	17	Dave Kilcoyne	(substituted on) 51'
PR	18	Finlay Bealham	(substituted on) 67'
LK	19	Kieran Treadwell	(substituted on) 62'
FL	20	Peter O'Mahony	(substituted on) 51'
SH	21	Conor Murray	(substituted on) 66'
FH	22	Joey Carbery	(substituted on) 73'
CE	23	Robbie Henshaw	(substituted on) 55'
Coach:
Andy Farrell

FB	15	Stuart Hogg (c)
RW	14	Darcy Graham
OC	13	Chris Harris		(substituted off) 66'
IC	12	Sam Johnson		(substituted off) 60'
LW	11	Kyle Steyn
FH	10	Blair Kinghorn
SH	9	Ali Price		(substituted off) 60'
N8	8	Matt Fagerson		(substituted off) 62'
OF	7	Hamish Watson
BF	6	Rory Darge
RL	5	Grant Gilchrist		(substituted off) 51'
LL	4	Jonny Gray
TP	3	Zander Fagerson		(substituted off) 54'
HK	2	George Turner		(substituted off) 51'
LP	1	Pierre Schoeman		(substituted off) 73'
Replacements:
HK	16	Fraser Brown		(substituted on) 51'
PR	17	Allan Dell		(substituted on) 73'
PR	18	WP Nel		(substituted on) 54'
LK	19	Sam Skinner		(substituted on) 51'
FL	20	Josh Bayliss		(substituted on) 62'
SH	21	Ben White	(yellow card) 77'	(substituted on) 60'
FH	22	Finn Russell		(substituted on) 66'
CE	23	Mark Bennett		(substituted on) 60'
Coach:
Gregor Townsend

Player of the Match:
Dan Sheehan (Ireland)

Assistant referees:
Karl Dickson (England)
Christophe Ridley (England)
Television match official:
Stuart Terheege (England)

Notes:

- Ireland won the Triple Crown for the first time since 2018, and the first time at home since 2004.
- Ireland retained the Centenary Quaich.

19 March 2022
21:00 CET (UTC+1)

France	25–13	England
Try: Fickou 14' m Cros 39' c Dupont 60' c Con: Jaminet (2/3) 40', 61'; Pen: Jaminet (2/2) 8', 23'	Report	Try: Steward 47' c Con: Smith (1/1) 49'; Pen: Smith (2/2) 19', 29'

Stade de France, Saint-Denis
Attendance: 80,000
Referee: Jaco Peyper (South Africa)

FB	15	Melvyn Jaminet	(substituted off) 76'
RW	14	Damian Penaud
OC	13	Gaël Fickou
IC	12	Jonathan Danty
LW	11	Gabin Villière
FH	10	Romain Ntamack
SH	9	Antoine Dupont (c)	(substituted off) 76'
N8	8	Grégory Alldritt
OF	7	Anthony Jelonch
BF	6	François Cros	(substituted off) 71'
RL	5	Paul Willemse	(substituted off) 49'
LL	4	Cameron Woki	(substituted off) 71'
TP	3	Uini Atonio	(substituted off) 54'
HK	2	Julien Marchand	(substituted off) 49'
LP	1	Cyril Baille	(substituted off) 49'
Replacements:
HK	16	Peato Mauvaka	(substituted on) 49'
PR	17	Jean-Baptiste Gros	(substituted on) 49'
PR	18	Mohamed Haouas	(substituted on) 54'
LK	19	Romain Taofifénua	(substituted on) 49'
LK	20	Thibaud Flament	(substituted on) 71'
FL	21	Dylan Cretin	(substituted on) 71'
SH	22	Maxime Lucu	(substituted on) 76'
FB	23	Thomas Ramos	(substituted on) 76'
Coach:
Fabien Galthié

FB	15	George Furbank	(substituted off) 76'
RW	14	Freddie Steward
OC	13	Joe Marchant
IC	12	Henry Slade
LW	11	Jack Nowell	(substituted off) 25'
FH	10	Marcus Smith
SH	9	Ben Youngs	(substituted off) 64'
N8	8	Sam Simmonds
OF	7	Sam Underhill	(substituted off) 64'
BF	6	Courtney Lawes (c)
RL	5	Nick Isiekwe	(substituted off) 61'
LL	4	Maro Itoje
TP	3	Will Stuart	(substituted off) 49'
HK	2	Jamie George
LP	1	Ellis Genge	(substituted off) 64'
Replacements:
HK	16	Nic Dolly
PR	17	Joe Marler	(substituted on) 64'
PR	18	Kyle Sinckler	(substituted on) 49'
LK	19	Ollie Chessum	(substituted on) 61'
N8	20	Alex Dombrandt	(substituted on) 64'
SH	21	Harry Randall	(substituted on) 64'
FH	22	George Ford	(substituted on) 76'
CE	23	Elliot Daly	(substituted on) 25'
Coach:
Eddie Jones

Player of the Match:
Antoine Dupont (France)

Assistant referees:
Mike Adamson (Scotland)
Frank Murphy (Ireland)
Television match official:
Marius Jonker (South Africa)

Notes:

- France won the Grand Slam title for the first time since 2010, the last time they won the Championship.
- France ended a 12-year wait to reclaim the Championship, their longest ever period between titles since their first title in 1959.

== Player statistics ==
=== Most points ===
Pos	Name	Team	Pts
1	Marcus Smith	England	71
2	Melvyn Jaminet	France	54
3	Johnny Sexton	Ireland	35
4	Dan Biggar	Wales	34
5	Finn Russell	Scotland	33
6	Paolo Garbisi	Italy	26
7	Joey Carbery	Ireland	18
8	James Lowe	Ireland	15
8	Damian Penaud	France	15
8	Gabin Villière	France	15

=== Most tries ===
Pos	Name	Team	Tries
1	James Lowe	Ireland	3
1	Damian Penaud	France	3
1	Gabin Villière	France	3
4	Josh Adams	Wales	2
4	Ange Capuozzo	Italy	2
4	Andrew Conway	Ireland	2
4	Antoine Dupont	France	2
4	Gaël Fickou	France	2
4	Jamie George	England	2
4	Jamison Gibson-Park	Ireland	2
4	Darcy Graham	Scotland	2
4	Chris Harris	Scotland	2
4	Anthony Jelonch	France	2
4	Michael Lowry	Ireland	2
4	Marcus Smith	England	2
4	Josh van der Flier	Ireland	2

== Broadcasting ==
In the United Kingdom, each game was broadcast live on a free-to-air terrestrial TV channel, either the BBC or ITV, as a result of a new deal covering the four years from 2022 to 2025. The BBC broadcast all Scotland and Wales home fixtures, with ITV airing all England, France, Ireland and Italy home fixtures. All of Wales' games were also broadcast on S4C in the Welsh language

In the Republic of Ireland, all games were shown free-to-air on either RTÉ or Virgin Media under the terms of the new TV rights share.
