= Toa Halafihi =

Italy international rugby union player

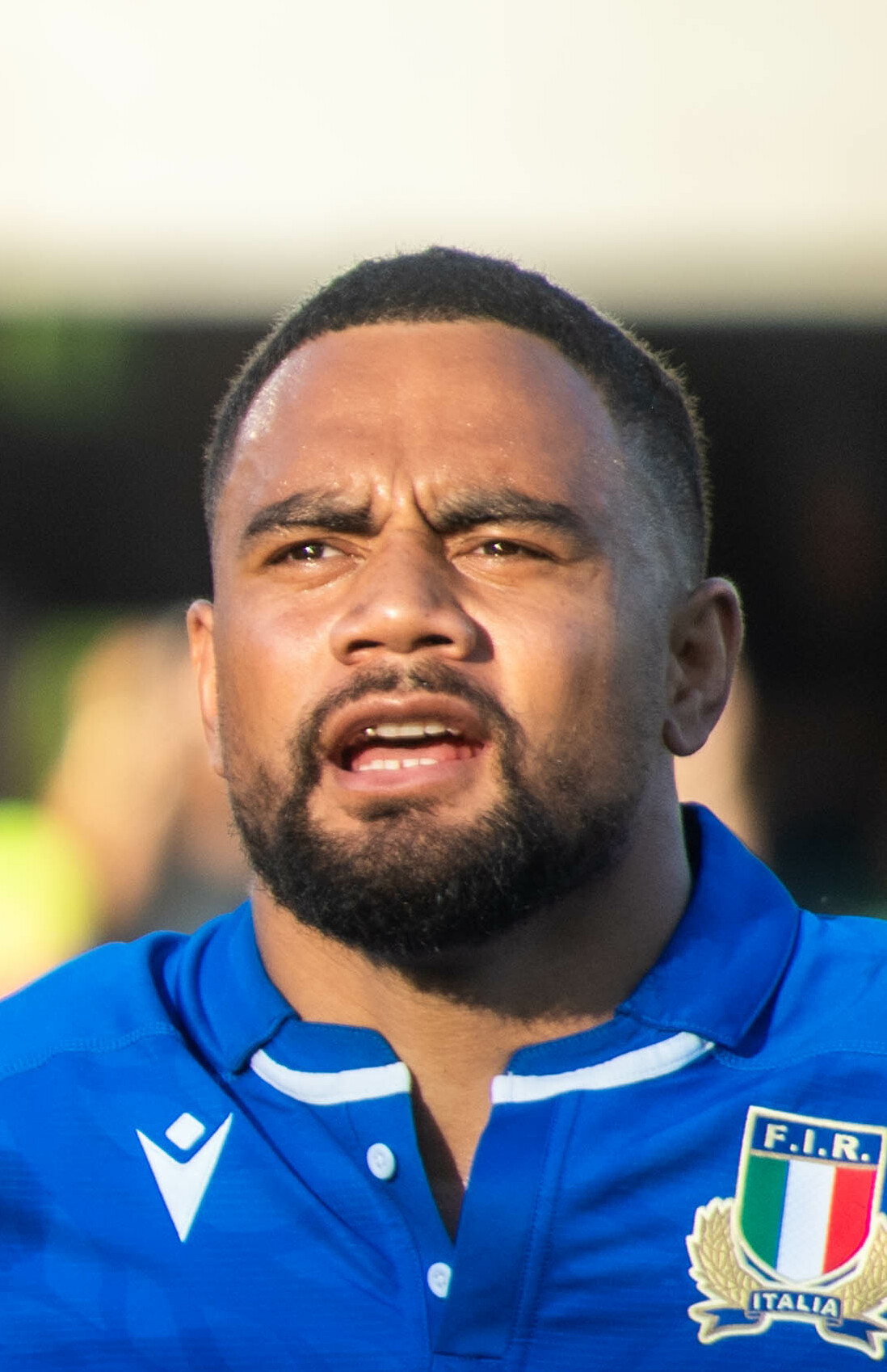
- Halafihi at the Summer Nations Series '23 playing for Italia vs Romania
- Born: 27 November 1993 (age 32) Gisborne, New Zealand
- Height: 191 cm (6 ft 3 in)
- Weight: 102 kg (225 lb; 16 st 1 lb)
- School: Gisborne Boys' High School

Rugby union career
- Position(s): Flanker, Number 8
- Current team: Petrarca Padova
Senior career
Years	Team	Apps	(Points)
2012	Poverty Bay	4	(0)
2014−2018	Taranaki	42	(60)
2017	Hurricanes	2	(0)
2017–2018	Lyon	12	(5)
2018−2025	Benetton	89	(60)
2025−	Petrarca Padova		
- Correct as of 9 Aug 2025
International career
Years	Team	Apps	(Points)
2021	Emerging Italy	1	(0)
2022−	Italy	12	(5)
- Correct as of 29 Sep 2023

Toa Halafihi (born 27 November 1993) is a New Zealand-born Italian professional rugby union player who primarily plays number eight for Petrarca Padova in the Italian top league Serie A Elite. He has also represented Italy at international level, having made his test debut against France during the 2022 Six Nations Championship. Halafihi has previously played provincial rugby for Poverty Bay and Taranaki, Super Rugby for the Hurricanes, and in France for Lyon. He played with Benetton in the United Rugby Championship until 2025.

== Early life ==
Born and raised in the city of Gisborne in the northeastern part of New Zealand, Halafihi was schooled at Gisborne Boys' High School and played first XV rugby for the school. After graduating high school, he played a season of Heartland Championship rugby with Poverty Bay in 2012 before later moving to Taranaki to play club rugby with Spotswood United.

== Club career ==
Halafihi first played provincial rugby for Taranaki during their ITM Cup Premiership title winning season of 2014, starting once and coming on as a replacement twice. He was much more of a regular in 2015, scoring 3 times in 9 outings to help the Bulls reach the Premiership semi-finals where they surrendered their crown to eventual winners, Canterbury, going down 46–20.

2016 saw him play in all 11 of Taranaki's games and score 5 tries, although owing to stiff competition from the likes of Lachlan Boshier, Mitchell Brown, Mitchell Crosswell and Iopu Iopu-Aso, he was restricted to just 6 starts. His most memorable moment of the year came when he scored the winning try in a 35–32 win over Auckland in the final league stage match which ensured Taranaki would claim a home semi-final. Unfortunately, they were defeated 41–29 by Tasman and were forced to wait another 12 months before once more trying to reclaim the Premiership title.

Good performances at domestic level for Taranaki over the course of the preceding 2 seasons brought him to the attention of Wellington-based Super Rugby franchise, the Hurricanes who named him in their squad ahead of their title defense in 2017.

== International career ==
On 8 December 2021, he was selected by Alessandro Troncon to be part of an Emerging Italy 27-man squad for the 2021 end-of-year rugby union internationals.

In February 2022, he was selected for Italy for the first time by coach Kieran Crowley for the 2022 Six Nations Championship, despite never having been capped for the senior squad. He made his debut against France. In February 2023, Benetton head coach Marco Bortolami, anncounced that Halafihi could also become an option for Italy in the 2023 Six Nations Championship.

On 22 August 2023, he was named in the Italy's 33-man squad for the 2023 Rugby World Cup.

== Honours ==
Taranaki

- ITM Cup - 2014
