= Anthony Jelonch =

French rugby union player (born 1996)

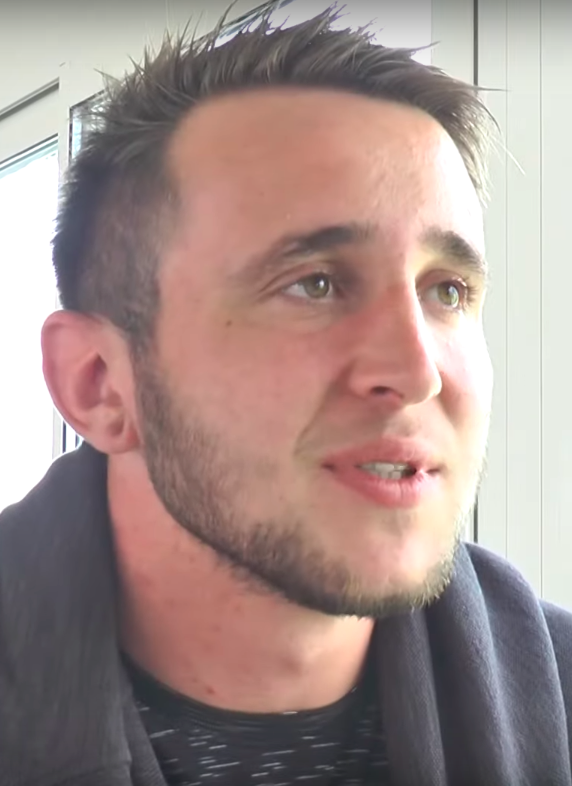
- Jelonch in a video for Castres in 2019
- Born: Anthony Jelonch; 28 July 1996 (age 30) Vic-Fezensac, France
- Height: 1.93 m (6 ft 4 in)
- Weight: 113 kg (249 lb; 17 st 11 lb)

Rugby union career
- Position(s): Flanker, Number eight, Lock
- Current team: Toulouse
Youth career
- 2004–2012: Vic-Fezensac
- 2012–2014: Auch
- 2014–2016: Castres
Senior career
Years	Team	Apps	(Points)
2016–2021	Castres	93	(65)
2021–	Toulouse	61	(55)
- Correct as of 18 March 2025
International career
Years	Team	Apps	(Points)
2017–	France	39	(15)
- Correct as of 7 March 2026

Anthony Jelonch (born 28 July 1996) is a French rugby union flanker and he currently plays for Toulouse.

== International career ==
Jelonch was part of the French squad for the 2017 France rugby union tour of South Africa.

On 17 July 2021, in the fifth minute of the third test between Australia and France, Marika Koroibete was sent off for a dangerous tackle on Jelonch. The red card was later rescinded by the World Rugby judiciary, who made the following finding, "No contact is made by the Player (Koroibete) on the French player higher than the neck region ... The French player grabs at his face and falls to the ground but no contact was made in the tackle by the Player to the area he grabbed." In the view of the three-person committee, Jelonch was acting. Despite this incident, Australia went on to win the match 33-30, and the series 2-1.

=== International tries ===
International tries
No.	Date	Venue	Opponent	Score	Result	Competition
1	6 February 2022	Stade de France, Saint-Denis, France	Italy	8–7	37–10	2022 Six Nations
2	11 March 2022	Millennium Stadium, Cardiff, Wales	Wales	3–8	9–13	2022 Six Nations
3	20 November 2022	Stadium de Toulouse, Toulouse, France	Japan	33–17	35–17	2022 Autumn internationals

== Honours ==
=== International ===
France

- 3x Six Nations Championship: 2022, 2025, 2026
- 1× Grand Slam: 2022

=== Club ===
(France) Toulouse

- European Rugby Champions Cup: 2023–24
- Top 14: 2024–25

(France) Castres

- Top 14: 2017–18
