= Melvyn Jaminet =

French rugby union player

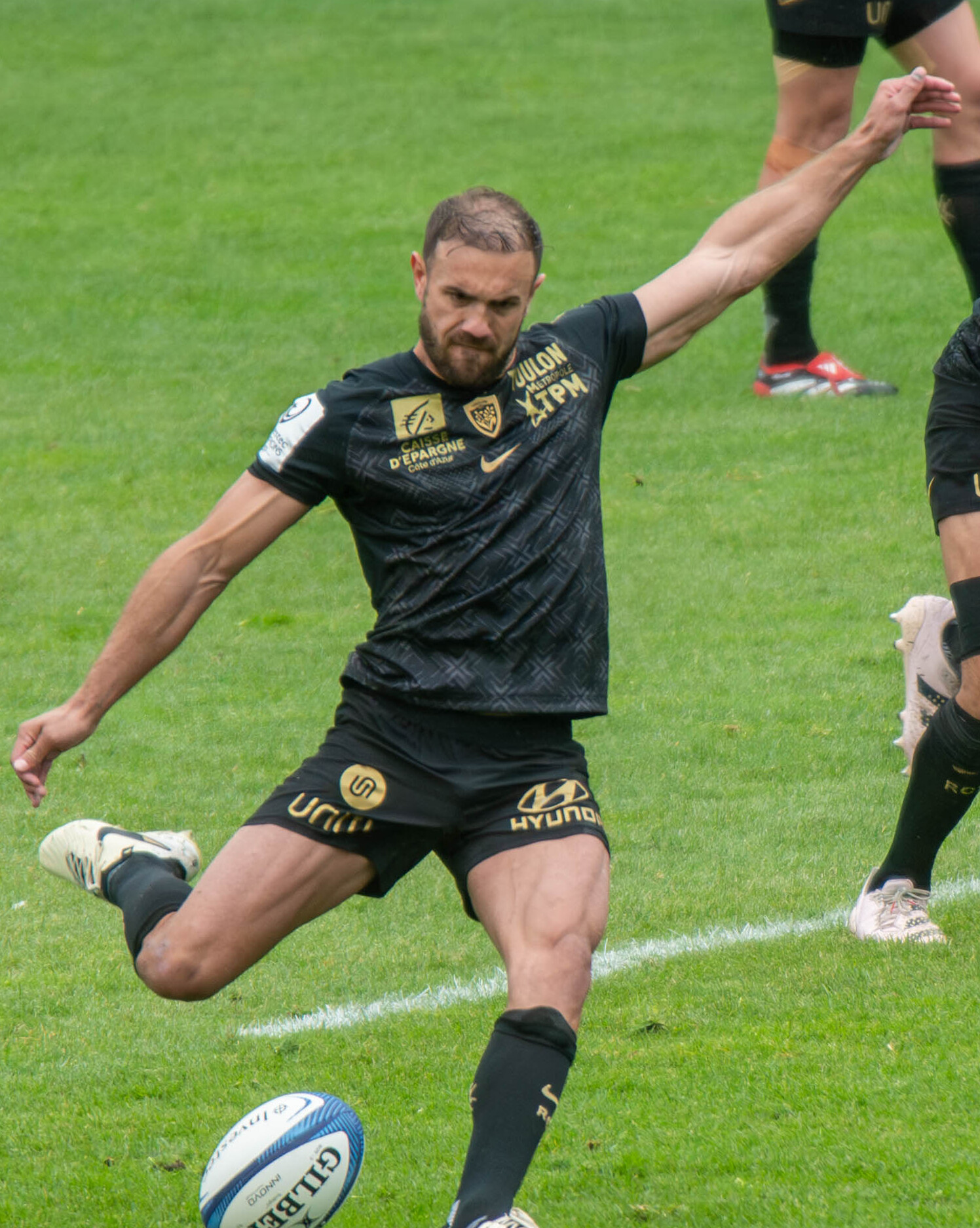
- Jaminet with Toulon in 2025
- Born: 30 June 1999 (age 27) Hyères, France
- Height: 1.80 m (5 ft 11 in)
- Weight: 85 kg (187 lb; 13 st 5 lb)

Rugby union career
- Position: Fullback
- Current team: Toulon
Senior career
Years	Team	Apps	(Points)
2019–2022	Perpignan	41	(459)
2022–2023	Toulouse	19	(143)
2023–	Toulon	30	(390)
- Correct as of 15 April 2025
International career
Years	Team	Apps	(Points)
2021–	France	20	(216)
- Correct as of 6 July 2024

Melvyn Jaminet (born 30 June 1999) is a French professional rugby union player who plays as a fullback for Top 14 club Toulon and the France national team.

== Professional career ==
Melvyn Jaminet was called by Fabien Galthié to the French national team for the first time in June 2021, for the Australia summer tour.

On 8 July 2024, Jaminet was suspended by the French Rugby Federation due to a racist post being discovered on his social media. Both the French Rugby Federation and Jaminet's club, Toulon, condemned his remarks, leading to his subsequent apology. An internal investigation was launched to shine a light on these comments.

== Career statistics ==
=== List of international tries ===
International tries
No.	Date	Venue	Opponent	Score	Result	Competition
1	8 September 2023	Stade de France, Saint-Denis, France	New Zealand	25–13	27–13	2023 Rugby World Cup
2	21 September 2023	Stade Vélodrome, Marseille, France	Namibia	85–0	96–0	2023 Rugby World Cup

== Honours ==
France

- 1× Six Nations Championship: 2022
- 1× Grand Slam: 2022

Perpignan

- 1× Pro D2: 2021

Toulouse

- 1× Top 14: 2023
