= Giovanni Pettinelli =

Italy international rugby union player

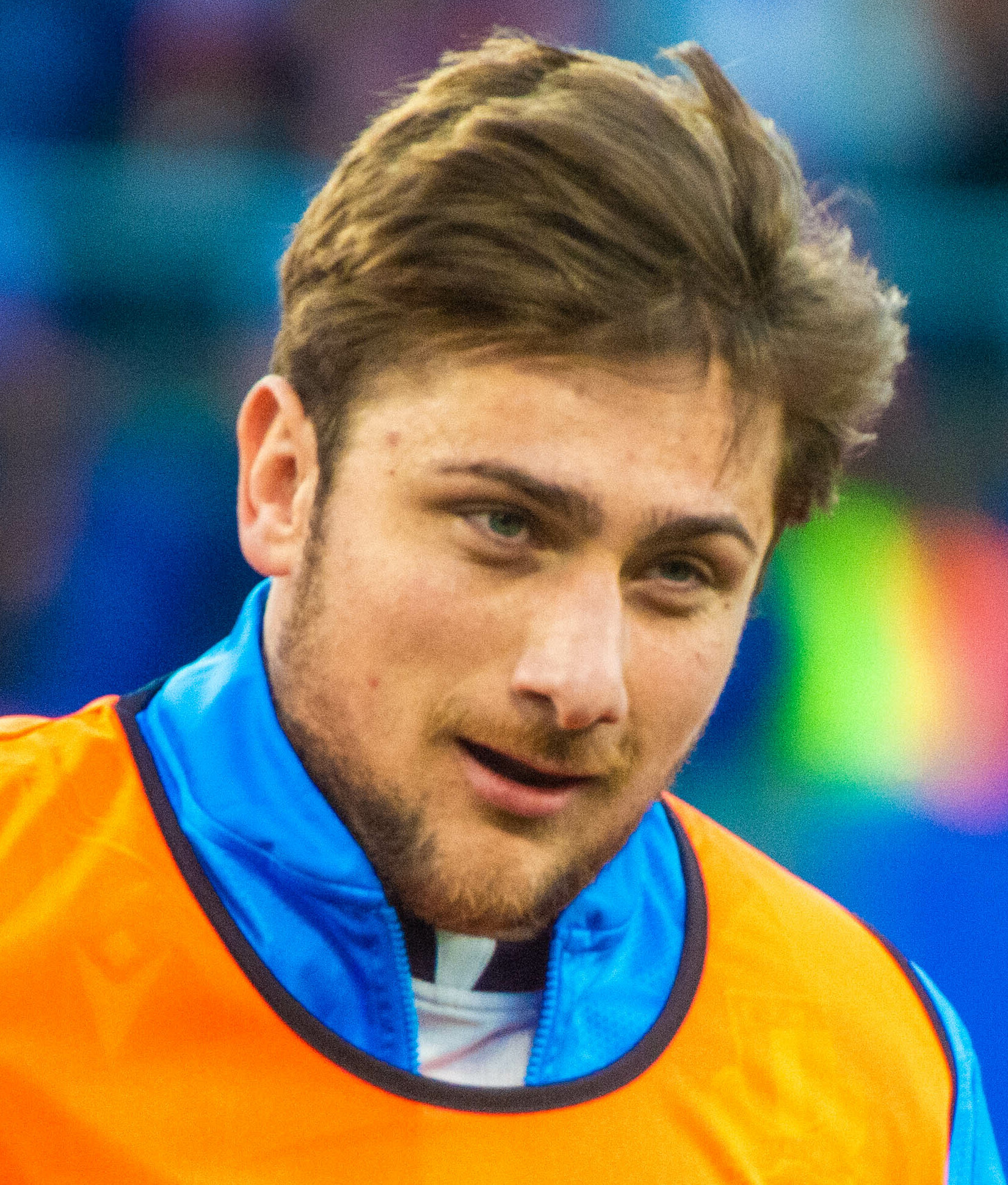
- Pettinelli in 2023
- Born: 13 March 1996 (age 30) Venice, Italy
- Height: 193 cm (6 ft 4 in)
- Weight: 110 kg (243 lb; 17 st 5 lb)

Rugby union career
- Position: Flanker
- Current team: Mogliano Veneto
Youth career
- Venezia Mestre Rugby FC
Senior career
Years	Team	Apps	(Points)
2015−2016	F.I.R. Academy		
2016	→Zebre Parma	1	(0)
2016–2018	Calvisano	31	(40)
2018–2024	Benetton	75	(25)
2024–	Mogliano Veneto		
- Correct as of 6 November 2022
International career
Years	Team	Apps	(Points)
2016	Italy U20	8	(5)
2018	Emerging Italy	3	(0)
2021	Italy A	1	(0)
2021–	Italy	15	(0)
- Correct as of 20 Sep 2023

Giovanni Pettinelli (Italian pronunciation: [dʒoˈvanni pettiˈnɛlli]; born 13 March 1996) is an Italian professional rugby union player who primarily plays flanker for Mogliano Veneto in the Italian Serie A Elite. He has also represented Italy at international level.

== Professional career ==
Pettinelli began his career at Calvisano in the Top12 before moving to Benetton ahead of the 2018–19 Pro14 season. While at Calvisano he made a single loan appearance for Zebre against Ospreys in the Pro12 on 2 September 2016. He played for Benetton until 2023–24 United Rugby Championship season.

Pettinelli was a member of the Italy squad at the 2016 Six Nations Under 20s Championship, and he scored a try against Ireland in the fourth round. He was also a member of the Italy squad at the 2016 World Rugby Under 20 Championship and of the Emerging Italy squad for the annual World Rugby Nations Cup in 2018. On 14 October 2021, he was selected by Alessandro Troncon to be part of an Italy A 28-man squad for the 2021 end-of-year rugby union internationals, having made his test debut against Argentina during the 2021 Autumn Nations Series.

Pettinelli was called up to the Italy squad for the first time ahead of the 2020 Six Nations Championship. On 31 October 2021, he was selected by Kieran Crowley to be part of an Italy 34-man squad for the 2021 end-of-year rugby union internationals.He made his debut against Argentina.

On 22 August 2023, he was named in the Italy's 33-man squad for the 2023 Rugby World Cup.
