= Pietro Ceccarelli =

Italy international rugby union player

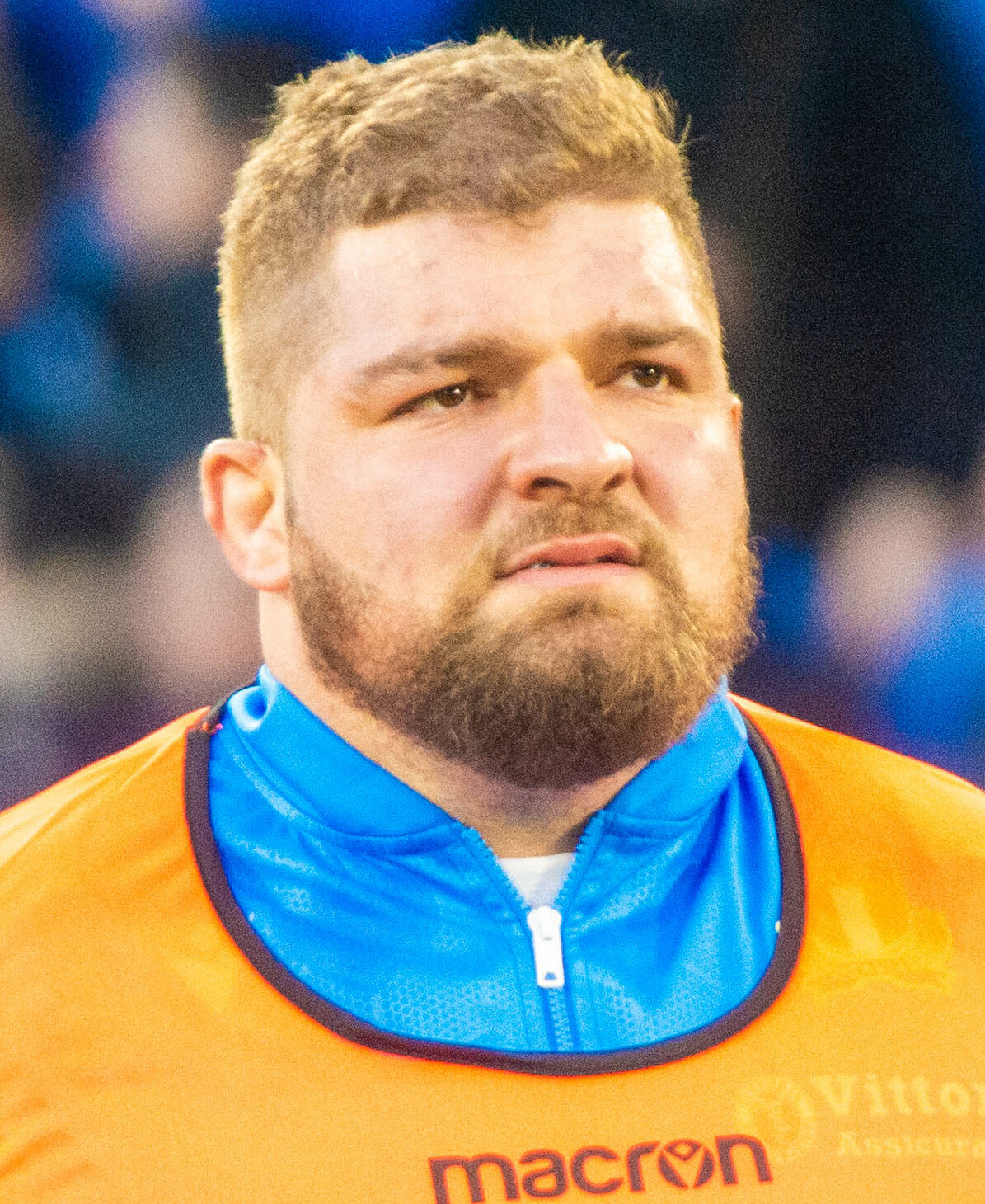
- Ceccarelli in 2023
- Born: 16 February 1992 (age 34) Rome, Italy
- Height: 184 cm (6 ft 0 in)
- Weight: 118 kg (260 lb; 18 st 8 lb)

Rugby union career
- Position: Prop
- Current team: Perpignan
Youth career
- Lazio
Senior career
Years	Team	Apps	(Points)
2011	Lazio	1	(0)
2014	La Rochelle	1	(0)
2014–2015	Mâcon	13	(0)
2015–2018	Zebre Parma	46	(0)
2017–2018	Oyonnax	24	(0)
2018–2020	Edinburgh	24	(0)
2021–2023	Brive	47	(10)
2023–	Perpignan	71	(15)
- Correct as of 16 Sep 2026
International career
Years	Team	Apps	(Points)
2011–2012	Italy U20	11	(0)
2013	Italy A	3	(0)
2014	Emerging Italy	3	(0)
2016–	Italy	34	(0)
- Correct as of 16 Sep 2026

Pietro Ceccarelli (born 16 February 1992) is an Italian professional rugby union player who primarily plays prop for Perpignan of the Top 14. He has also represented Italy at the international level, having made his test debut against Ireland during the 2016 Six Nations Championship. Ceccarelli has previously played for clubs such as Lazio, La Rochelle, Mâcon, Zebre Parma, Oyonnax, and Edinburgh in the past.

== Professional career ==
After the experience with La Rochelle, he played for Zebre, in 2015–16 Pro12 and 2016–17 Pro12 seasons. From 2018 to 2020 he come back to Pro14 with Edinburgh Rugby In Top14 he also played with Oyonnax in 2017–18 Top 14 season. He played for Brive in the French Top 14 from 2021 to 2023.

From 2011 to 2012, Ceccarelli was named in the Italy Under 20 squad and from 2013 to 2015 in the Emerging Italy squad.

In March 2016, he was named in the Italian squad for the 2016 Six Nations Championship.

On 22 August 2023, he was named in Italy's 33-man squad for the 2023 Rugby World Cup.
