= Paul Willemse =

France international rugby union player (born 1992)

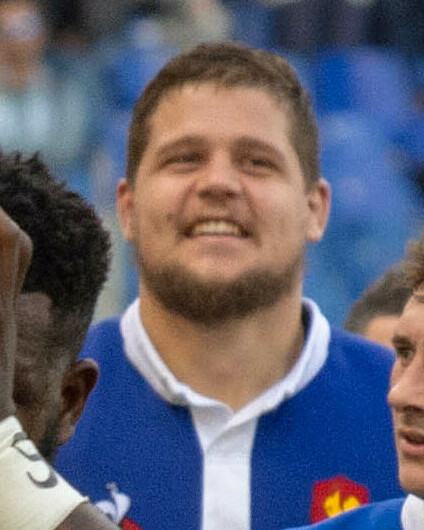
- Willemse with France in 2019
- Born: 13 November 1992 (age 34) Pretoria, South Africa
- Height: 2.01 m (6 ft 7 in)
- Weight: 128 kg (20 st 2 lb; 282 lb)
- School: Monument High School, Krugersdorp

Rugby union career
- Position: Lock
Youth career
- 2008–2010: Welwitschias
- 2010–2012: Golden Lions
- 2013: Blue Bulls
Amateur team(s)
Years	Team	Apps	(Points)
2013	UP Tuks	2	(5)
Senior career
Years	Team	Apps	(Points)
2012	Golden Lions	6	(10)
2012	Lions	1	(0)
2013–2014	Blue Bulls	23	(15)
2013–2014	Bulls	20	(15)
2014–2015	Grenoble	17	(5)
2015–2025	Montpellier	174	(190)
- Correct as of 18 April 2023
International career
Years	Team	Apps	(Points)
2012	South Africa U20	5	(10)
2019–2024	France	32	(10)

Paul Willemse (born 13 November 1992) is a former French-South African professional rugby union player, who played as a lock. Born and raised in South Africa, he moved to France in 2014 and qualified for his adoptive country's national team after acquiring French nationality in 2018. He played most of his career for Top 14 club Montpellier.

== Club career ==
=== Youth ===
Despite being born in Pretoria, Willemse moved to Tsumeb in Namibia, where he played rugby for Tsumeb Gymnasium and earned a call-up to the Namibian Under-18 Craven Week squad in 2009.

Willemse was then offered a junior contract by the Golden Lions and moved to Krugersdorp in 2010 to complete his schooling at Monument High School. He once again played at the Craven Week tournament, this time in the colours of the Golden Lions.

In 2011, Willemse represented the Golden Lions U19 side in the 2011 Under-19 Provincial Championship. He scored eight tries to finish joint-third on the try-scoring charts and the leading forward try-scorer.

=== Golden Lions / Lions ===
In 2012, Willemse made his first class debut, starting the Golden Lions' 23–16 loss to the Leopards in Potchefstroom in the 2012 Vodacom Cup competition. Willemse scored his first try the following week, scoring the Lions' second try in a comfortable 59–29 over near-neighbours Falcons in Johannesburg.

Willemse made two more starts for the Golden Lions in the Vodacom Cup – scoring another try in their match against the Griffons – before being included in the Lions' starting line-up for their 2012 Super Rugby match against the Cheetahs in Bloemfontein, which ended in a 5–26 loss to the Lions. He made one more appearance in the Vodacom Cup before earning a call-up to the South Africa U20 side.

During the latter half of 2012, he was mainly used in the Golden Lions U21 side that played in the 2012 Under-21 Provincial Championship, scoring three tries in 11 appearances. However, he also made his Currie Cup debut, starting their 2012 Currie Cup Premier Division match against the Blue Bulls in Johannesburg.

=== Blue Bulls / Bulls / UP Tuks ===
For the start of the 2013 season, Willemse made the short move across the Jukskei River to join Pretoria-based side Blue Bulls. He made two appearances for university side UP Tuks in the 2013 Varsity Cup competition before the Blue Bulls' 2013 Vodacom Cup matches against Griquas and the Pumas.

Willemse got another taste of Super Rugby action, starting in the Bulls' Australian tour matches against the Reds in Brisbane and the Brumbies in Canberra, before making three appearances off the bench upon their return to South African soil.

In July 2013, the Blue Bulls announced that he signed a contract extension until 31 October 2014.

Still eligible to play at Under-21 level, he made four appearances for the Blue Bulls U21 side during the 2013 Under-21 Provincial Championship, but he firmly established himself in the first team, starting ten matches during the 2013 Currie Cup Premier Division. He scored three tries during the competition, two of those coming in their match against Griquas in Kimberley.

Willemse featured prominently for the Bulls during the 2014 Super Rugby season, playing in 15 matches during the season. This season saw him score his first try in Super Rugby, in a 26–21 win against the Cheetahs in Pretoria. He ended the 2014 Super Rugby season on a high note, scoring two tries in a 40–7 victory over the Melbourne Rebels in their final pool match of the season.

Willemse started all 11 of the Blue Bulls' matches in the 2014 Currie Cup Premier Division as they reached the semi-final of the competition before being eliminated by Western Province in Cape Town.

=== Grenoble ===
In June 2014, it was announced that Willemse would join French Top 14 side Grenoble after the 2014 Currie Cup Premier Division competition.

=== Montpellier ===
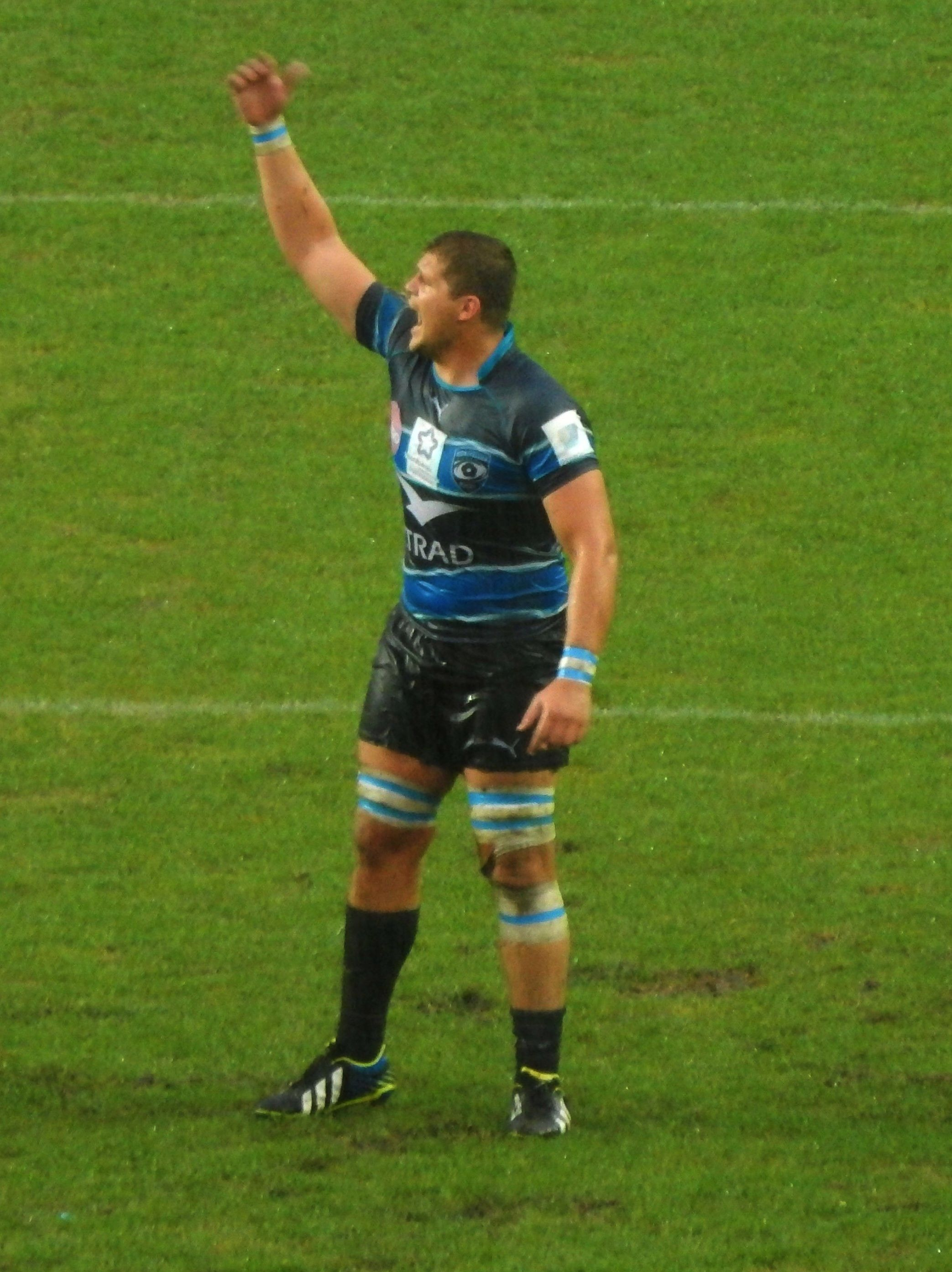
Willemse in action in August 2015

Willemse joined French Top 14 side Montpellier in June 2015.

== International career ==
=== South Africa U20 ===
Willemse was named in the South Africa Under-20 team that won the 2012 IRB Junior World Championship held in South Africa. Despite Willemse scoring a try for South Africa in their first match of the tournament, he could not prevent his side losing 23–19 to Ireland. He repeated his try-scoring feat in their next match against Italy in a 52–3 victory and he played the entire match as South Africa beat England 28–15 in their final pool match to ensure qualification to the semi-finals.

Willemse started in both the semi-final against Argentina, a comprehensive 35–3 victory, and the final against New Zealand, where he helped South Africa to a 22–16 victory to ensure they lifted the trophy for the first time.

=== France ===
In May 2018, Bernard Laporte declared that Willemse could be selected for the French national team due to his three years of residence on French territory as well as his request for a French passport. However, he returned on his position in October 2018 saying that he could not be called until he obtained his passport. On 30 November 2018, he announced that he had obtained French nationality. On 9 January 2019, he was summoned to the French team group to prepare for the 2019 Six Nations.

Willemse was only a reservist in Jacques Brunel's list to prepare for the 2019 Rugby World Cup in Japan. However, he quickly forfeited, and was replaced by Romain Taofifénua.

==== International tries ====
International tries
No.	Date	Venue	Opponent	Score	Result	Competition
1	22 February 2020	Principality Stadium, Cardiff, Wales	Wales	6–15	23–27	2020 Six Nations
2	26 February 2022	Murrayfield Stadium, Edinburgh, Scotland	Scotland	0–5	17–36	2022 Six Nations

== Retirement ==
On 15 September 2025, Willemse announced his retirement on Instagram, citing multiple concussions.

== Honours ==
=== Montpellier ===
- Top 14: 2021-22
- European Rugby Challenge Cup: 2015–2016

=== France ===
- Six Nations Championship: 2022
