= Gabin Villière =

French rugby union footballer

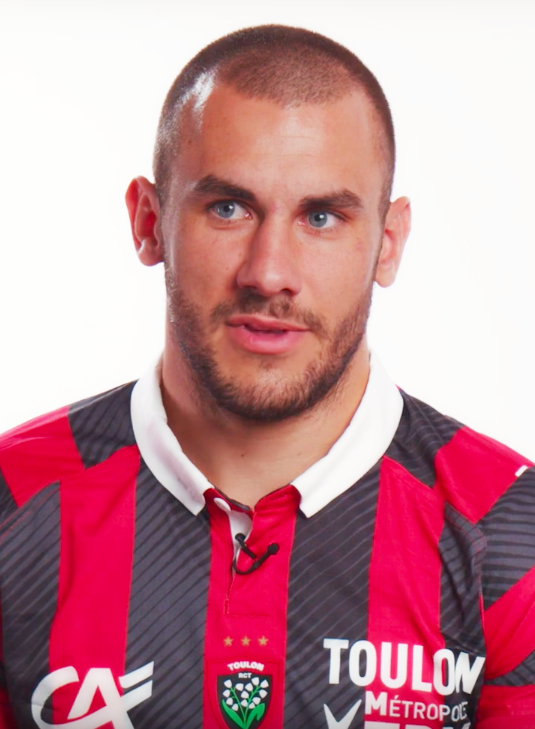
- Villière in a video with Toulon in 2022
- Born: 13 December 1995 (age 30) Vire, France
- Height: 1.80 m (5 ft 11 in)
- Weight: 88 kg (194 lb; 13 st 12 lb)

Rugby union career
- Position: Wing
- Current team: Toulon
Amateur team(s)
Years	Team	Apps	(Points)
- Rouen
Senior career
Years	Team	Apps	(Points)
2016–2019	Rouen	64	(220)
2019–	Toulon	81	(135)
- Correct as of 20 January 2025
International career
Years	Team	Apps	(Points)
2020–	France	20	(45)
- Correct as of 22 November 2024
National sevens team
Years	Team		Comps
2017–2019	France		43

Gabin Villière (born 13 December 1995) is a French rugby union player for Toulon in the Top14 and the France national team. His position is wing.

== International career ==
=== International tries ===
International tries
No.	Date	Venue	Opponent	Score	Result	Competition
1	28 November 2020	Stade de France, Saint-Denis, France	Italy	15–5	36–5	Autumn Nations Cup
2	7 July 2021	Suncorp Stadium, Brisbane, Australia	Australia	0–5	23–21	2021 Australia test series
3	7 July 2021	Suncorp Stadium, Brisbane, Australia	Australia	0–13	23–21	2021 Australia test series
4	6 February 2022	Stade de France, Saint-Denis, France	Italy	16–10	37–10	2022 Six Nations
5	6 February 2022	Stade de France, Saint-Denis, France	Italy	23–10	37–10	2022 Six Nations
6	6 February 2022	Stade de France, Saint-Denis, France	Italy	35–10	37–10	2022 Six Nations
7	27 August 2023	Stade de France, Saint-Denis, France	Australia	31–12	41–17	2023 Rugby World Cup warm-up matches
8	22 November 2024	Stade de France, Saint-Denis, France	Argentina	18–9	37–23	2024 Autumn internationals
9	5 July 2025	Forsyth Barr Stadium, Dunedin, New Zealand	New Zealand	21–18	31–27	2025 New Zealand test series

== Honours ==
=== International ===
France

- 2× Six Nations Championship: 2022, 2025
- Grand Slam: 2022
