= Cyril Baille =

French rugby union player (born 1993)

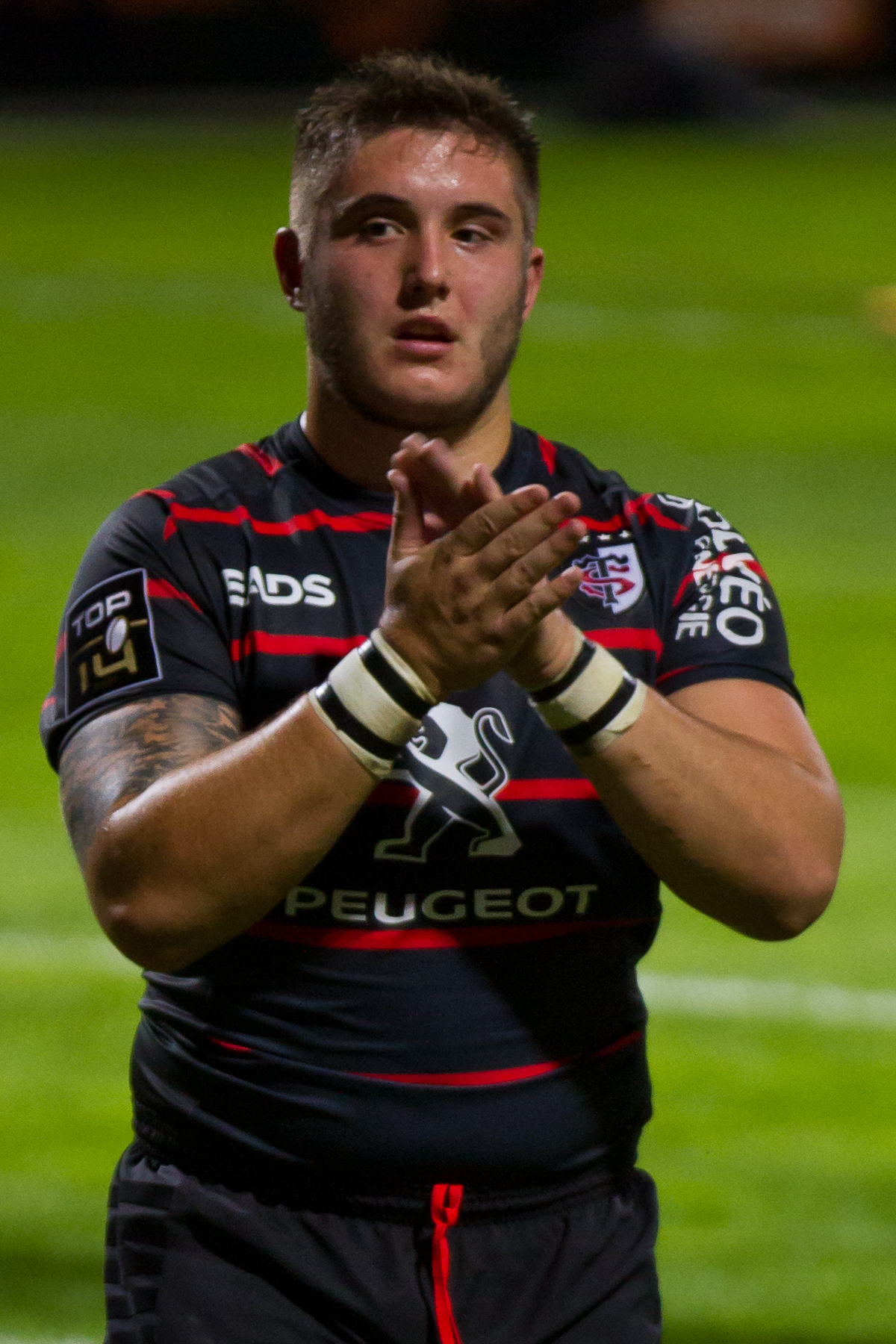
- Baille representing Toulouse during the Top 14
- Born: 15 September 1993 (age 33) Pau, France
- Height: 1.82 m (6 ft 0 in)
- Weight: 118 kg (260 lb; 18 st 8 lb)

Rugby union career
- Position: Prop
- Current team: Toulouse
Senior career
Years	Team	Apps	(Points)
2012–	Toulouse	169	(30)
- Correct as of 27 March 2023
International career
Years	Team	Apps	(Points)
2013	France U20	5	(0)
2016–	France	57	(25)
- Correct as of 15 March 2025

Cyril Baille (born 15 September 1993) is a French professional rugby union player who plays as a prop for Top 14 club Toulouse and the France national team.

== Professional career ==
Baille made his debut for France in November 2016 and was part of the squad for the 2017 Six Nations Championship.

== Career statistics ==
=== List of international tries ===
International tries
No.	Date	Venue	Opponent	Score	Result	Competition
1	24 October 2020	Stade de France, Saint-Denis, France	Wales	5–10	38–21	Test Match
2	12 February 2022	Stade de France, Saint-Denis, France	Ireland	27–21	30–24	2022 Six Nations
3	12 November 2022	Stade Vélodrome, Marseille, France	South Africa	11–0	30–26	2022 Autumn internationals
4	15 October 2023	Stade de France, Saint-Denis, France	South Africa	5–0	28–29	2023 Rugby World Cup
5	15 October 2023	Stade de France, Saint-Denis, France	South Africa	17–19	28–29	2023 Rugby World Cup

== Honours ==
France

- 3x Six Nations Championship: 2022, 2025, 2026
- 1× Grand Slam: 2022

Toulouse

- 2× European Rugby Champions Cup: 2021, 2024
- 5× Top 14: 2019, 2021, 2023,2024 & 2025
