= Uini Atonio =

France international rugby union player

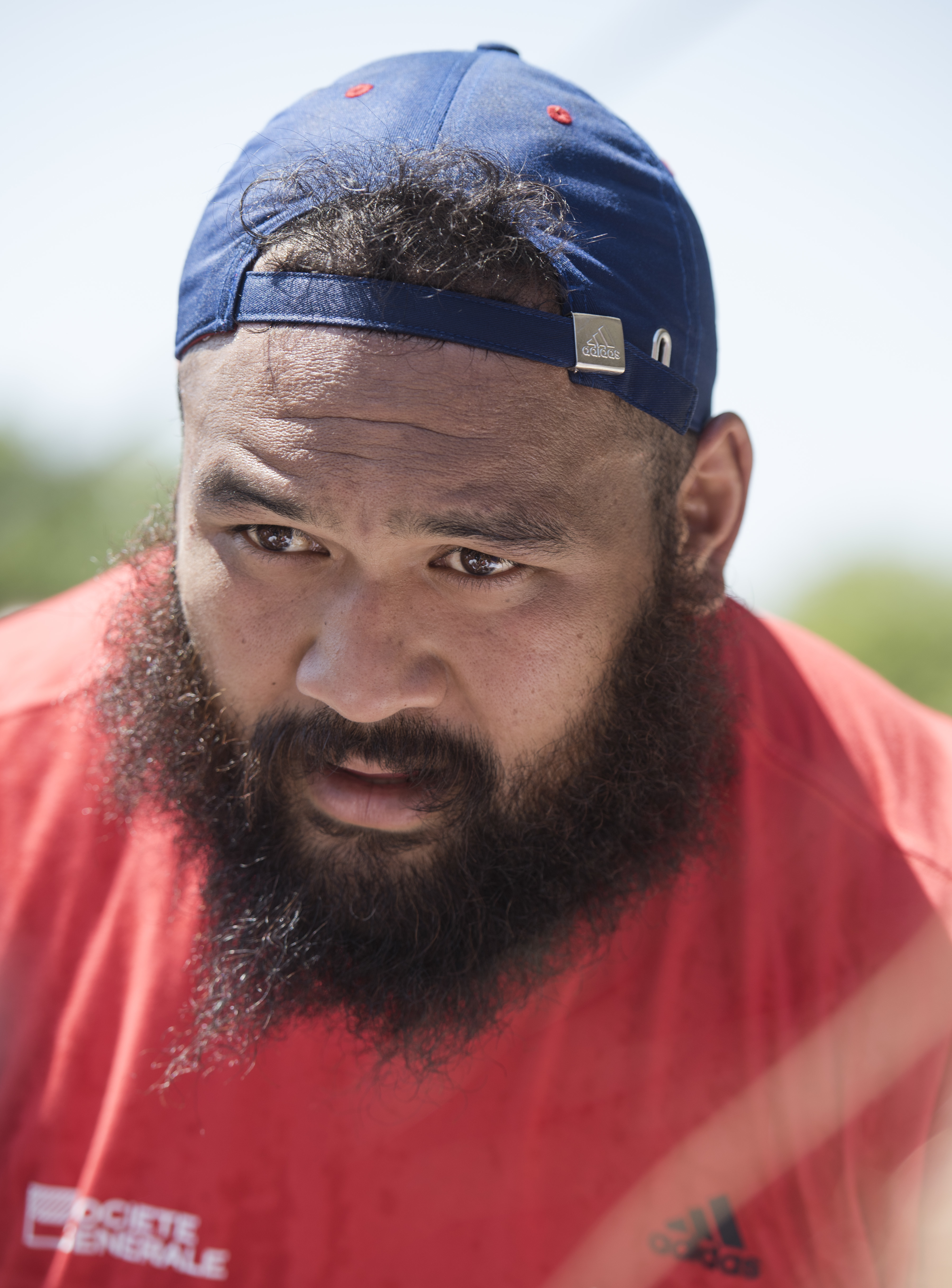
- Atonio training with France in 2015
- Born: 26 March 1990 (age 36) Timaru, New Zealand
- Height: 1.96 m (6 ft 5 in)
- Weight: 149 kg (328 lb; 23 st 6 lb)
- School: Wesley College

Rugby union career
- Position: Prop
Senior career
Years	Team	Apps	(Points)
2011–2026	La Rochelle	329	(75)
International career
Years	Team	Apps	(Points)
2009	Samoa U20	5	(0)
2014–2026	France	68	(10)

Uini Atonio (Samoan: [wini atoniːo]; born 26 March 1990) is a former professional rugby union player who played as a prop. He played most of his career for Top 14 club La Rochelle. Born in New Zealand, he represented France at international level after qualifying on residency grounds. He retired at the age of 35 due to a heart attack in January 2026.

== Early life ==
Uini Atonio was born on 26 March 1990 in Timaru, New Zealand, to Samoan parents. He started playing rugby union in his hometown at the age of five for amateur club Harlequins RFC. In 2000, he moved to Auckland with his family and attended Wesley College in Pukekohe before joining Counties Manukau at sixteen years old where he stayed until 2011.

At his time at Wesley College, his older brother Vau and he did theatre and were part of the Black Friars, the school's company which performed Shakespeare's plays. After being released by Counties Manukau, he did a few professional theatrical performances to make a little money.

== Club career ==
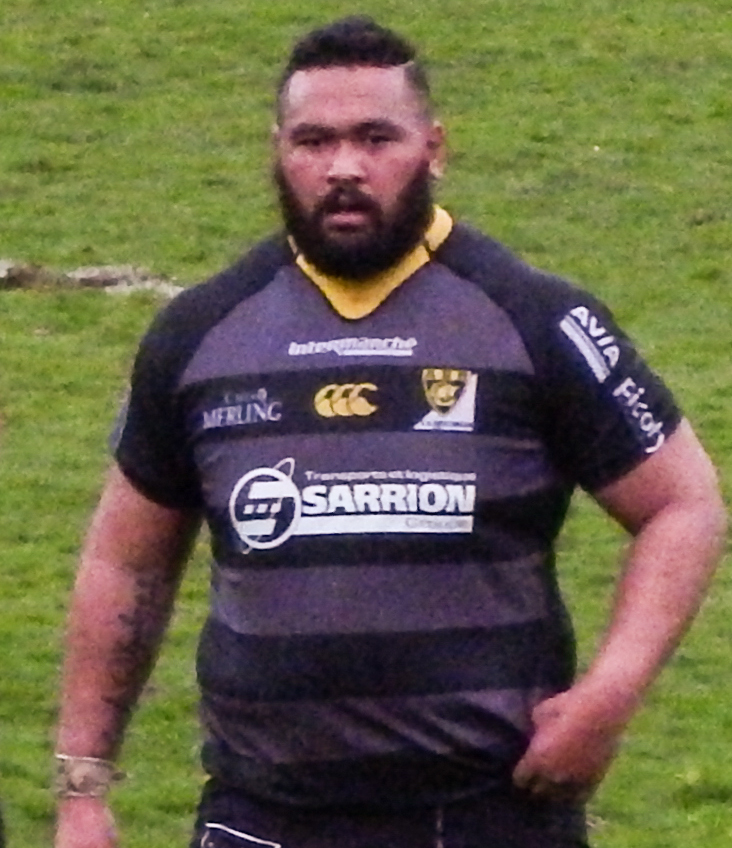
Atonio playing for La Rochelle in 2014

On 1 July 2011, Atonio joined French club La Rochelle after then-head coach Patrice Collazo spotted him at a rugby tens tournament in Hong Kong in 2010. Shortly after his arrival in France, he played his first professional game for the club during the 2011–12 Pro D2 season. After having played fourteen games in his first season, he played twenty nine matches in his second and then thirty in his third season at the end of which he was integral to La Rochelle promotion into the Top 14 in 2014, becoming a cornerstone of the team.

On 16 August 2014, he played his very first Top 14 game against Brive in a 37–15 away loss.

In the 2020–21 season, he reached the Champions Cup and Top 14 finals but lost both games against Toulouse after losing the 2018–19 Challenge Cup final two years earlier.

On 28 May 2022, he led La Rochelle to an epic 21–24 win against Leinster in the 2021–22 European Rugby Champions Cup final at Stade Vélodrome in Marseille, playing more than sixty minutes and earning his first major trophy with the club.

== International career ==
"My son was born in France. Honestly, I feel French. I sing the French anthem. You play for the nation, for your country."

— Atonio at a press conference in January 2017.

Born in New Zealand to Samoan parents, Atonio was eligible to play for both New Zealand and Samoa. He later qualified for France through residency having lived in La Rochelle since 2011.

In 2009, he was named in the Samoa U20 squad for the 2009 IRB Junior World Championship in Japan and was the heaviest player in the tournament.

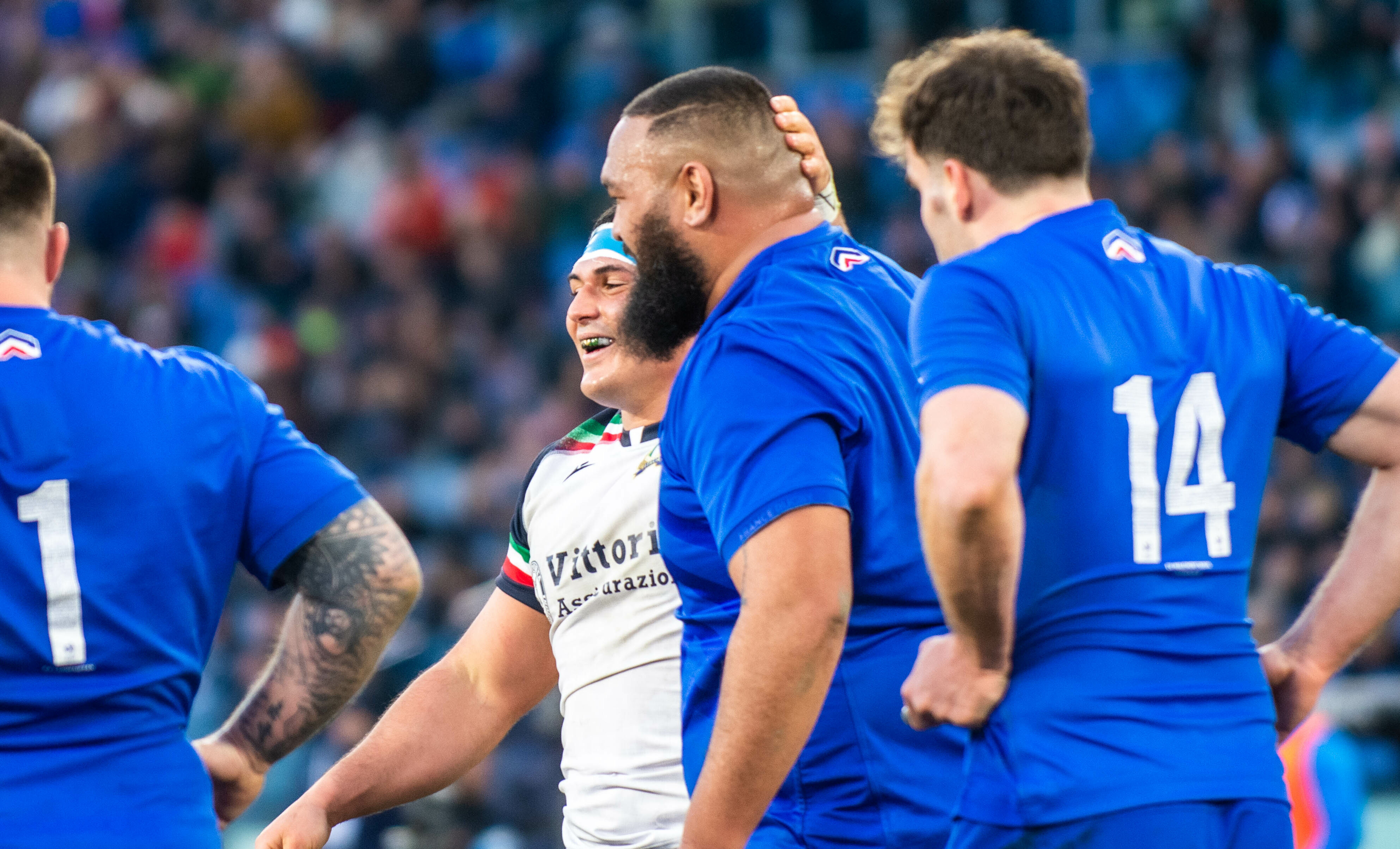
Atonio (centre) playing for France in 2023

In 2014, he was called up to the France national team for the 2014 Autumn internationals after completing the required three years of residency and made his debut on 8 November in a 40–15 win over Fiji in Marseille. He was then included in the France squad for the 2015 Six Nations Championship and the 2015 Rugby World Cup a year later, as well as for the 2016, 2017 and 2018 Six Nations Championships.

In 2022, Atonio was included in the squad for the 2022 Six Nations Championship, played in all five games as a starter and won the first French Grand Slam since 2010 after finishing in second place a year ago.

On 28 January 2026, Atonio was hospitalised following a heart attack. It was announced that the player would not be able to continue his career.

== Career statistics ==
=== List of international tries ===
No.	Date	Venue	Opponent	Score	Result	Competition
1	18 March 2023	Stade de France, Saint-Denis, France	Wales	25–7	41–28	2023 Six Nations
2	19 August 2023	Stade de la Beaujoire, Nantes, France	Fiji	21–10	34–17	2023 Rugby World Cup warm-up matches

== Honours ==
La Rochelle

- 2× European Rugby Champions Cup: 2022, 2023
- 1× European Rugby Champions Cup runner-up: 2021
- 1× European Rugby Challenge Cup runner-up: 2019
- 2× Top 14 runner-up: 2021, 2023

France

- 3x Six Nations Championship: 2022, 2025, 2026
- 1× Grand Slam: 2022
- 2× Six Nations Championship runner-up: 2021, 2023
