= François Cros =

French rugby union player

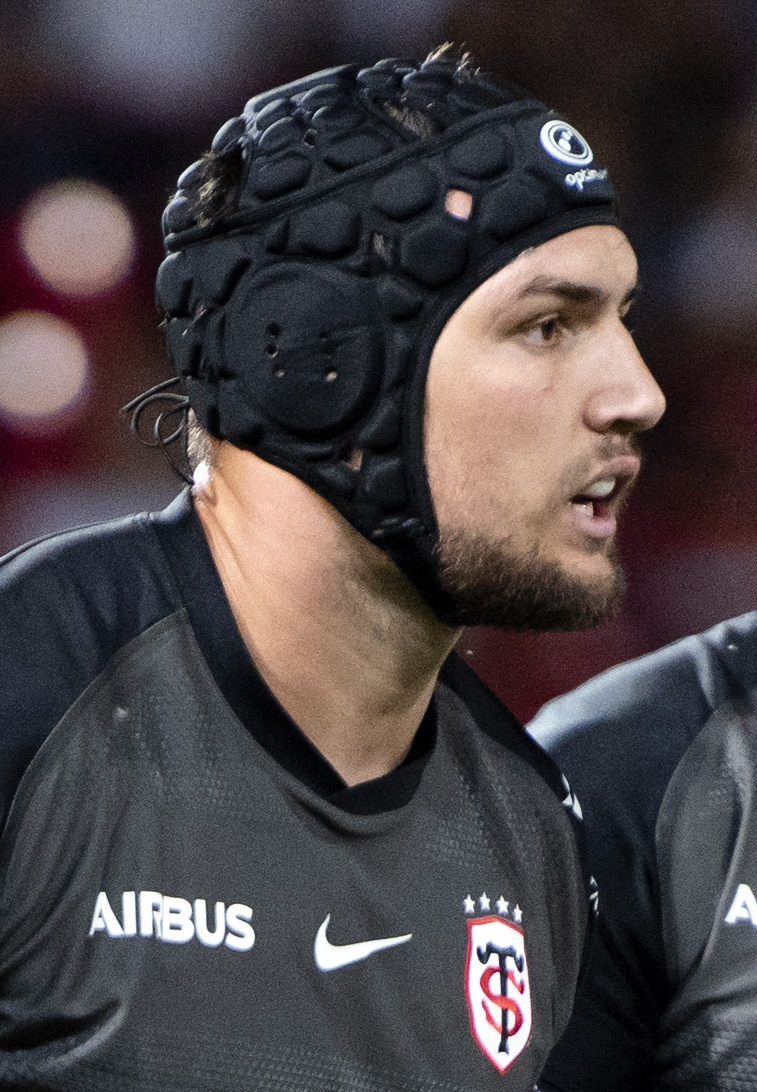
- Cros representing Toulouse during the Top 14
- Born: 25 March 1994 (age 32) Toulouse, France
- Height: 1.90 m (6 ft 3 in)
- Weight: 110 kg (243 lb; 17 st 5 lb)

Rugby union career
- Position(s): Flanker, Number 8
- Current team: Toulouse
Senior career
Years	Team	Apps	(Points)
2016–	Toulouse	183	(70)
- Correct as of 19 January 2025
International career
Years	Team	Apps	(Points)
2013–2014	France U20	16	(10)
2019–	France	44	(5)
- Correct as of 14 March 2026

François Cros (born 25 March 1994) is a French professional rugby union player who plays as a flanker for Top 14 club Toulouse and the France national team.

== Career statistics ==
=== List of international tries ===
International tries
No.	Date	Venue	Opponent	Score	Result	Competition
1	19 March 2022	Stade de France, Saint-Denis, France	England	16–6	25–13	2022 Six Nations

== Honours ==
France

- 3x Six Nations Championship: 2022, 2025, 2026
- 1× Grand Slam: 2022

Toulouse

- 2× European Rugby Champions Cup: 2021, 2024
- 5× Top 14: 2019, 2021, 2023, 2024, 2025
