= Tiziano Pasquali =

Italy international rugby union player

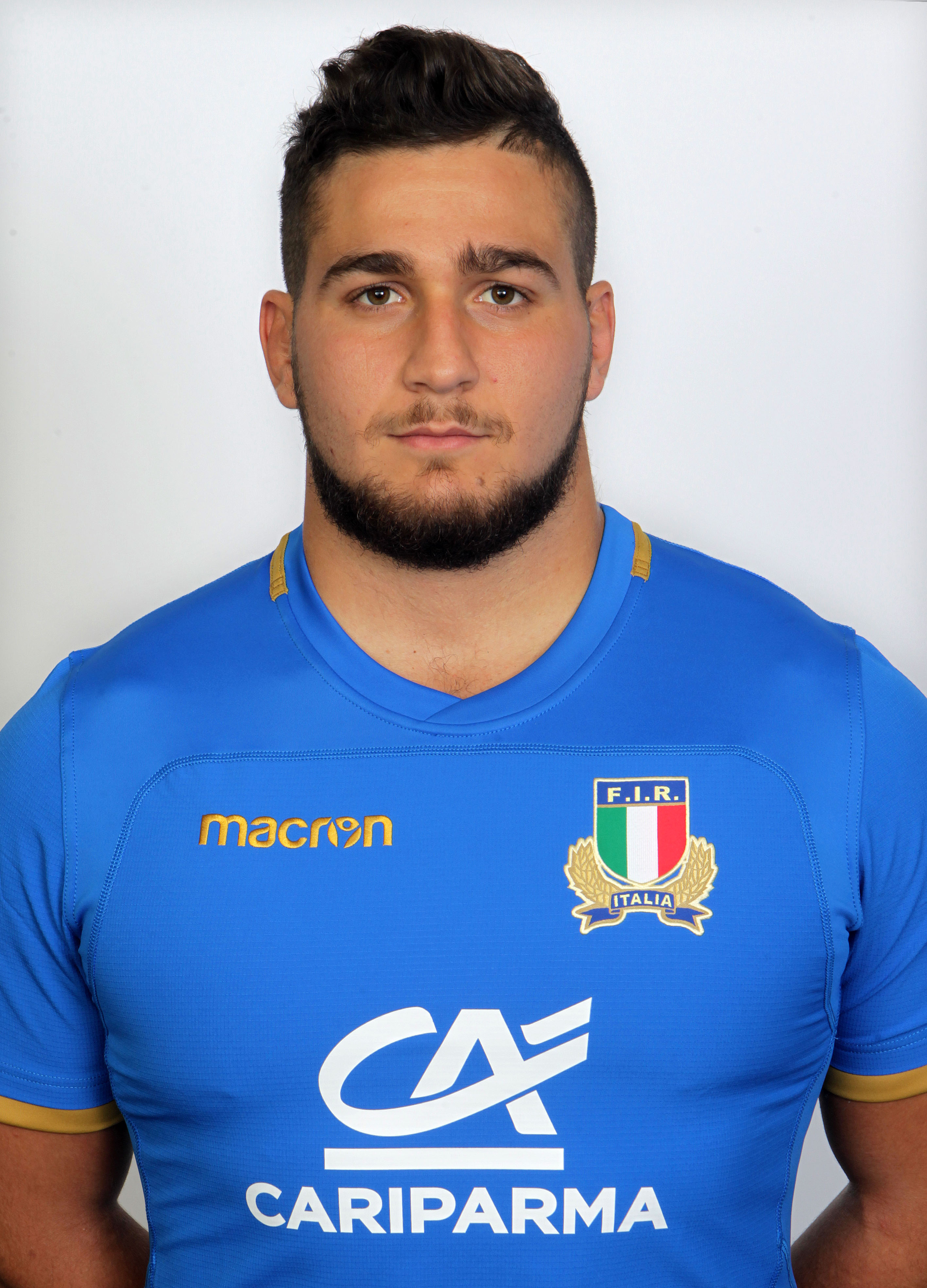
- Pasquali in 2017
- Born: 14 July 1994 (age 32) Rome, Italy
- Height: 1.79 m (5 ft 10 in)
- Weight: 118 kg (18 st 8 lb)
- School: Merchiston Castle School

Rugby union career
- Position: Prop
- Current team: Benetton
Amateur team(s)
Years	Team	Apps	(Points)
2007–09	Appia Rugby		
2009–10	S.S. Lazio		
Senior career
Years	Team	Apps	(Points)
2011–2016	Leicester Tigers	10	(0)
2014–2016	→Doncaster Knights	6	(0)
2016-	Benetton Rugby	156	(0)
- Correct as of 29 Aug 2026
International career
Years	Team	Apps	(Points)
2012–2013	Italy Under 20	4	(5)
2017-	Italy	25	(5)
- Correct as of 29 Aug 2026

Tiziano Pasquali (born 14 July 1994) is a professional Italian rugby union player who plays as a prop for Benetton Treviso in United Rugby Championship.

Pasquali came through the Leicester Tigers academy system to make his debut in the 2013–14 LV Cup.

He attended Merchiston Castle School with Scottish international scrum halves Sam Hidalgo-Clyne and Scott Steele.

In 2012 and 2013, Pasquali was named in the Italy Under 20 squad. On 18 August 2019, he was named in the final 31-man squad for the 2019 Rugby World Cup.
