= Jonathan Danty =

French rugby union player

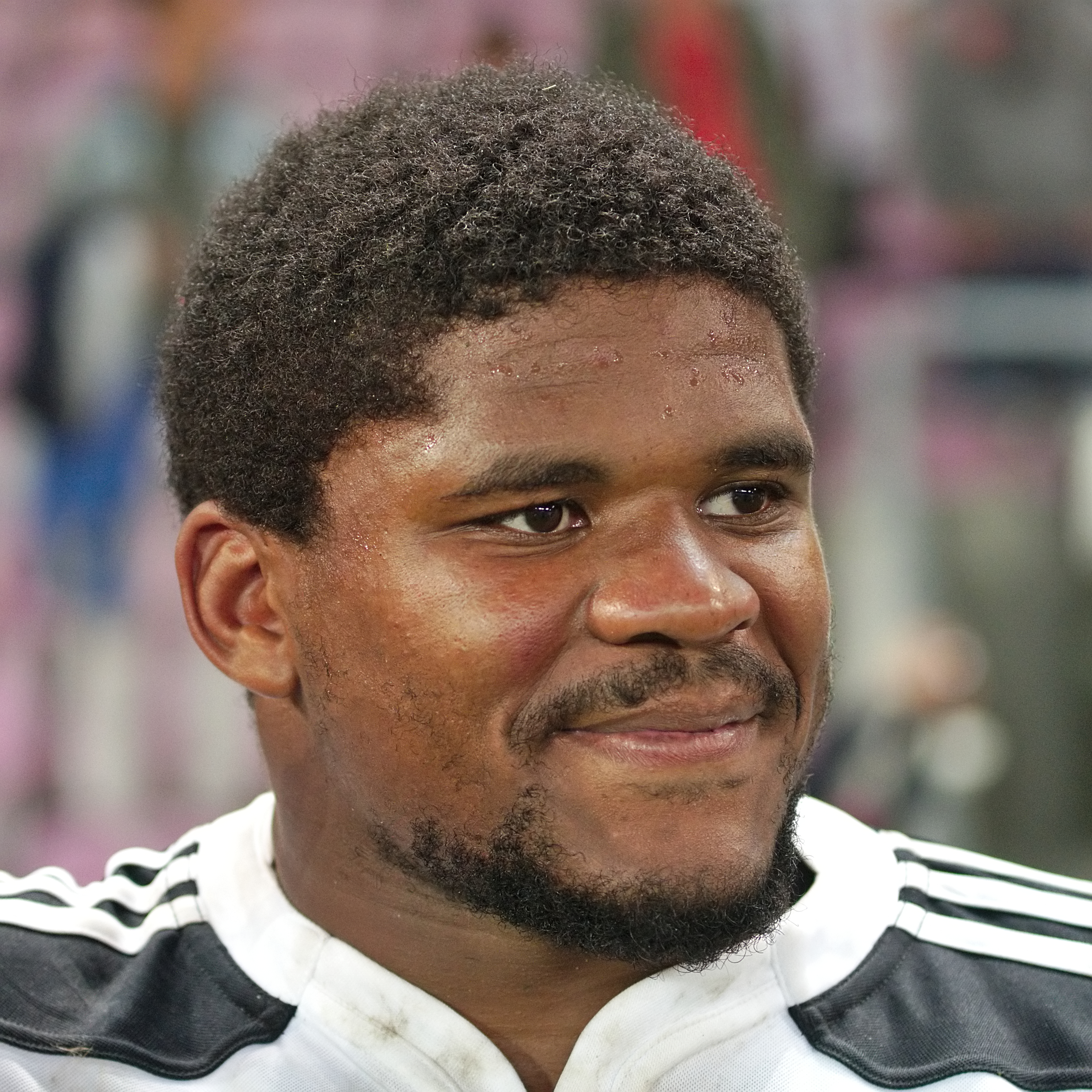
- Danty representing Stade Français during the Top 14
- Born: 7 October 1992 (age 34) Paris, France
- Height: 1.81 m (5 ft 11 in)
- Weight: 110 kg (243 lb; 17 st 5 lb)

Rugby union career
- Position: Centre
- Current team: La Rochelle
Senior career
Years	Team	Apps	(Points)
2011–2021	Stade Français	190	(135)
2021–	La Rochelle	40	(20)
- Correct as of 17 June 2023
International career
Years	Team	Apps	(Points)
2012	France U20	10	(5)
2016–	France	29	(30)
- Correct as of 25 February 2024

Jonathan Danty (born 7 October 1992) is a French professional rugby union player who plays as a centre for Top 14 club La Rochelle and the France national team.

== Personal life ==
Born in metropolitan France, Danty is of Guadeloupean descent.

== Career statistics ==
=== List of international tries ===
International tries
No.	Date	Venue	Opponent	Score	Result	Competition
1	28 November 2020	Stade de France, Saint-Denis, France	Italy	8–5	36–5	Autumn Nations Cup
2	26 February 2022	Murrayfield Stadium, Edinburgh, Scotland	Scotland	10–24	17–36	2022 Six Nations
3	18 March 2023	Stade de France, Saint-Denis, France	Wales	18–7	41–28	2023 Six Nations
4	27 August 2023	Stade de France, Saint-Denis, France	Australia	5–0	41–17	2023 Rugby World Cup warm-up matches
5	21 September 2023	Stade Vélodrome, Marseille, France	Namibia	10–0	96–0	2023 Rugby World Cup
6	21 September 2023	Stade Vélodrome, Marseille, France	Namibia	31–0	96–0	2023 Rugby World Cup

== Honours ==
France

- 1× Six Nations Championship: 2022
- 1× Grand Slam: 2022

Stade Français

- 1× Top 14: 2014–15
- 1× European Rugby Challenge Cup: 2016–17

La Rochelle

- 2× European Rugby Champions Cup: 2021–22, 2022–23
