= 2023 Six Nations Championship =

Rugby union competition in Europe

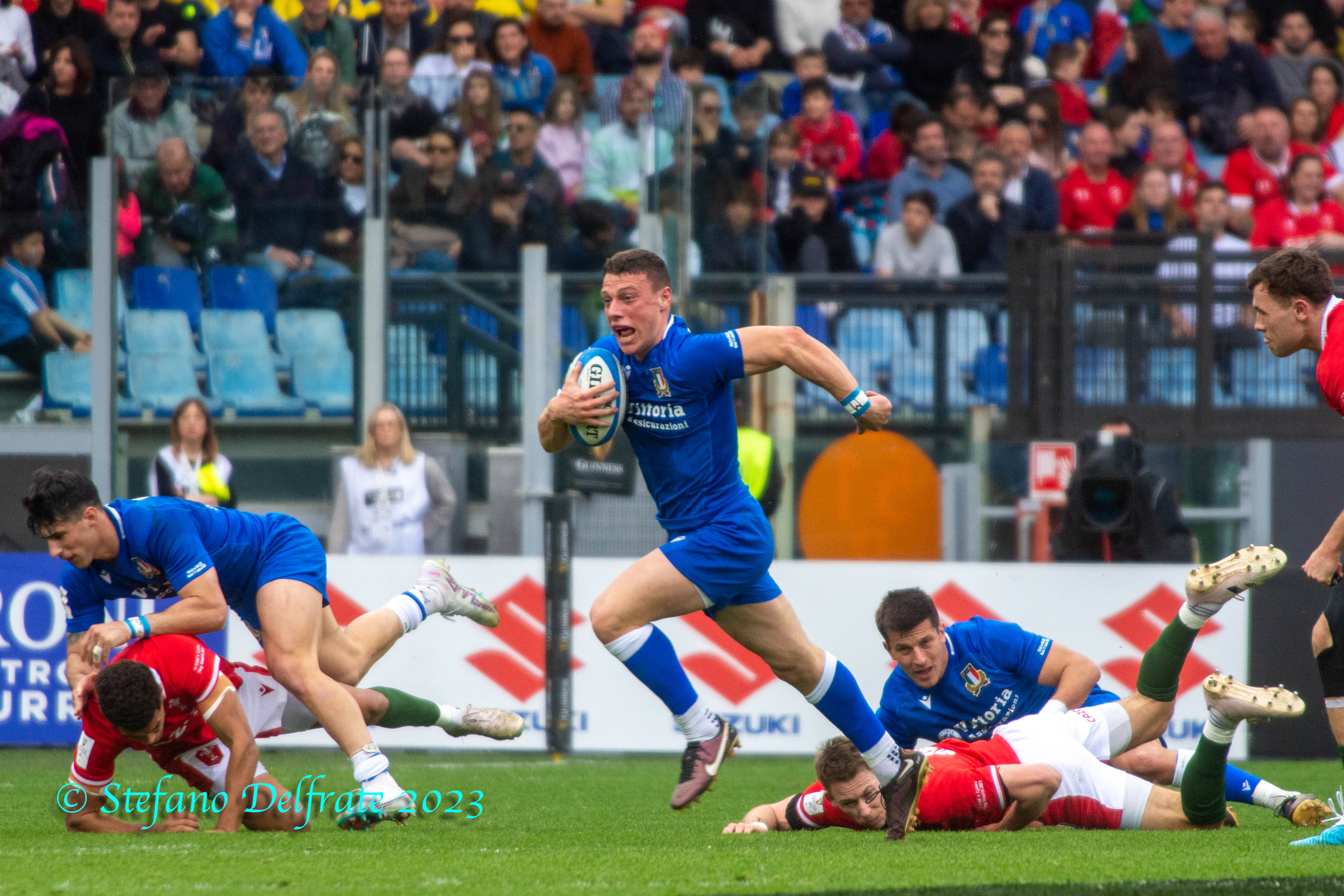
- 2023 Six Nations Italy vs Wales
- Date: 4 February – 18 March 2023
- Countries: England; France; Ireland; Italy; Scotland; Wales

Tournament statistics
- Champions: Ireland (15th title)
- Grand Slam: Ireland (4th title)
- Triple Crown: Ireland (13th title)
- Matches played: 15
- Attendance: 1,010,930 (67,395 per match)
- Tries scored: 91 (6.07 per match)
- Top point scorers: (France) Thomas Ramos (84 points)
- Top try scorers: (France) Damian Penaud (5 tries)
- Player of the tournament: (France) Antoine Dupont

The men's 2023 Six Nations Championship (known as the Guinness Six Nations for sponsorship reasons) was the 24th Six Nations Championship, an annual rugby union competition contested by the men's national teams of England, France, Ireland, Italy, Scotland and Wales. It was the 129th edition of the competition (including all its previous incarnations as the Home Nations Championship and Five Nations Championship). France entered the tournament as defending champions, having won the Grand Slam in 2022.

Ireland won the tournament for a 15th time, along with a 13th Triple Crown and a fourth Grand Slam; it was also the first time they won the title in Dublin. In beating England in their final game on 18 March, Ireland completed a full set of consecutive victories over all the other tier-one international sides. In total 91 tries were scored in this edition of the competition, a Championship record. Ireland's tally of twenty seven points, only one less than the possible maximum of twenty eight, was the highest points total in the competitions history since it adopted the rugby bonus point system. Only Scotland denied Ireland a try bonus point in their five matches.

== Participants ==
Nation	Stadium			Head coach	Captain
Nation	Home stadium	Capacity	Location	Head coach	Captain
England	Twickenham Stadium	82,000	London	(England) Steve Borthwick	Owen Farrell
France	Stade de France	81,338	Saint-Denis	(France) Fabien Galthié	Antoine Dupont
Ireland	Aviva Stadium	51,700	Dublin	(England) Andy Farrell	Johnny Sexton
Italy	Stadio Olimpico	73,261	Rome	(New Zealand) Kieran Crowley	Michele Lamaro
Scotland	Murrayfield Stadium	67,144	Edinburgh	(Scotland) Gregor Townsend	Jamie Ritchie
Wales	Millennium Stadium	73,931	Cardiff	(New Zealand) Warren Gatland	Ken Owens

== Table ==
Pos	Team	Pld	W	D	L	PF	PA	PD	TF	TA	GS	TB	LB	Pts	IRE	FRA	SCO	ENG	WAL	ITA
1	Ireland	5	5	0	0	151	72	+79	20	6	3	4	0	27	—	32–19		29–16		
2	France	5	4	0	1	174	115	+59	21	14	0	4	0	20		—	32–21		41–28	
3	Scotland	5	3	0	2	118	98	+20	17	12	0	3	0	15	7–22		—		35–7	26–14
4	England	5	2	0	3	100	135	−35	13	18	0	1	1	10		10–53	23–29	—		31–14
5	Wales	5	1	0	4	84	147	−63	11	19	0	2	0	6	10–34			10–20	—	
6	Italy	5	0	0	5	89	149	−60	9	22	0	0	1	1	20–34	24–29			17–29	—

Source: ESPN

Table ranking rules

- Four points are awarded for a win.
- Two points are awarded for a draw.
- A bonus point is awarded to a team that scores four or more tries, or loses by seven points or fewer. If a team scores four or more tries, and loses by seven points or fewer, they are awarded both bonus points.
- Three bonus points are awarded to a team that wins all five of their matches (a Grand Slam). This ensures that a Grand Slam winning team would top the table with at least 23 points, as there would otherwise be a scenario where a team could win all five matches with no bonus points for a total of 20 points and another team could win four matches with bonus points and lose their fifth match while claiming one or more bonus points giving a total of 21 or 22 points.
- Tiebreakers
  - If two or more teams are tied on table points, the team with the better points difference (points scored less points conceded) is ranked higher.
  - If the above tiebreaker fails to separate tied teams, the team that scores the higher number of total tries (including penalty tries) in their matches is ranked higher.
  - If two or more teams remain tied after applying the above tiebreakers then those teams will be placed at equal rank; if the tournament has concluded and more than one team is placed first then the title will be shared between them.

== Fixtures ==
The tournament's fixtures were announced on 20 April 2022. There were no Friday night fixtures. Other than the final weekend, the three kick-off time slots were the same each weekend of the tournament.

=== Round 1 ===
4 February 2023
14:15 GMT (UTC+0)

Wales	10–34	Ireland (1 BP)
Try: L. Williams 46' c Con: Biggar (1/1) 46'; Pen: Biggar (1/1) 14'	Report	Try: Doris 2' c Ryan 9' c Lowe 21' c Van der Flier 73' c Con: Sexton (3/3) 3', 10', 22'; Byrne (1/1) 73'; Pen: Sexton (2/2) 19', 28'

Millennium Stadium, Cardiff
Attendance: 74,500
Referee: Karl Dickson (England)

FB	15	Liam Williams	(yellow card) 64'
RW	14	Josh Adams
OC	13	George North
IC	12	Joe Hawkins
LW	11	Rio Dyer		(substituted off) 69'
FH	10	Dan Biggar		(substituted off) 68'
SH	9	Tomos Williams		(substituted off) 64'
N8	8	Taulupe Faletau
OF	7	Justin Tipuric		(substituted off) 54'
BF	6	Jac Morgan
RL	5	Alun Wyn Jones		(substituted off) 61'
LL	4	Adam Beard
TP	3	Tomas Francis		(substituted off) 40'
HK	2	Ken Owens (c)		(substituted off) 61'
LP	1	Gareth Thomas		(substituted off) 54'
Replacements:
HK	16	Scott Baldwin		(substituted on) 61'
PR	17	Rhys Carré		(substituted on) 54'
PR	18	Dillon Lewis		(substituted on) 40'
LK	19	Dafydd Jenkins		(substituted on) 61'
FL	20	Tommy Reffell		(substituted on) 54'
SH	21	Rhys Webb		(substituted on) 64'
FH	22	Owen Williams		(substituted on) 68'
WG	23	Alex Cuthbert		(substituted on) 69'
Coach:
(New Zealand) Warren Gatland

FB	15	Hugo Keenan
RW	14	Mack Hansen
OC	13	Garry Ringrose
IC	12	Stuart McCloskey	(substituted off) 60'
LW	11	James Lowe
FH	10	Johnny Sexton (c)	(substituted off) 69'
SH	9	Conor Murray	(substituted off) 64'
N8	8	Caelan Doris
OF	7	Josh van der Flier
BF	6	Peter O'Mahony	(substituted off) 60'
RL	5	James Ryan
LL	4	Tadhg Beirne	(substituted off) 54'
TP	3	Finlay Bealham	(substituted off) 60'
HK	2	Dan Sheehan	(substituted off) 74'
LP	1	Andrew Porter	(substituted off) 74'
Replacements:
HK	16	Rob Herring	(substituted on) 74'
PR	17	Dave Kilcoyne	(substituted on) 74'
PR	18	Tom O'Toole	(substituted on) 60'
LK	19	Iain Henderson	(substituted on) 54'
N8	20	Jack Conan	(substituted on) 60'
SH	21	Craig Casey	(substituted on) 64'
FH	22	Ross Byrne	(substituted on) 69'
CE	23	Bundee Aki	(substituted on) 60'
Coach:
(England) Andy Farrell

Player of the Match:
Hugo Keenan (Ireland)

Assistant referees:
Angus Gardner (Australia)
Luke Pearce (England)
Television match official:
Tom Foley (England)

Notes:

- Leigh Halfpenny (Wales) was originally named at full-back, but he was replaced by Liam Williams ahead of the match, after suffering a back spasm in training.
- Jamison Gibson-Park (Ireland) was originally named at scrum-half, but withdrew on the day of the match due to injury. He was replaced in the starting line-up by Conor Murray, whose place in the bench was taken by Craig Casey.
- Cian Healy (Ireland) was originally named among the replacements, but withdrew on the day of the match due to injury. His place was taken by Dave Kilcoyne.
- Ireland won at the Millennium Stadium in a Six Nations match for the first time since 2013.

4 February 2023
16:45 GMT (UTC+0)

(1 BP) England	23–29	Scotland (1 BP)
Try: Malins (2) 24' m, 38' m Genge 48' c Con: Farrell (1/3) 49'; Pen: Farrell (2/2) 43', 65'	Report	Try: Jones 15' c Van der Merwe (2) 29' m, 74' c White 51' c Con: Russell (3/4) 16', 53', 76'; Pen: Russell (1/1) 69'

Twickenham Stadium, London
Attendance: 81,545
Referee: Paul Williams (New Zealand)

FB	15	Freddie Steward
RW	14	Max Malins
OC	13	Joe Marchant	(substituted off) 76'
IC	12	Owen Farrell (c)
LW	11	Ollie Hassell-Collins	(substituted off) 65'
FH	10	Marcus Smith
SH	9	Jack van Poortvliet	(substituted off) 59'
N8	8	Alex Dombrandt	(substituted off) 56'
OF	7	Ben Curry	(substituted off) 61'
BF	6	Lewis Ludlam
RL	5	Ollie Chessum
LL	4	Maro Itoje
TP	3	Kyle Sinckler	(substituted off) 61'
HK	2	Jamie George
LP	1	Ellis Genge	(substituted off) 61'
Replacements:
HK	16	Jack Walker
PR	17	Mako Vunipola	(substituted on) 61'
PR	18	Dan Cole	(substituted on) 61'
LK	19	Nick Isiekwe	(substituted on) 61'
FL	20	Ben Earl	(substituted on) 56'
SH	21	Ben Youngs	(substituted on) 59'
CE	22	Ollie Lawrence	(substituted on) 76'
WG	23	Anthony Watson	(substituted on) 65'
Coach:
(England) Steve Borthwick

FB	15	Stuart Hogg	(substituted off) 66'
RW	14	Kyle Steyn
OC	13	Huw Jones	(substituted off) 76'
IC	12	Sione Tuipulotu
LW	11	Duhan van der Merwe
FH	10	Finn Russell
SH	9	Ben White	(substituted off) 70'
N8	8	Matt Fagerson
OF	7	Luke Crosbie	(substituted off) 59'
BF	6	Jamie Ritchie (c)
RL	5	Grant Gilchrist	(substituted off) 66'
LL	4	Richie Gray
TP	3	WP Nel	(substituted off) 59'
HK	2	George Turner	(substituted off) 59'
LP	1	Pierre Schoeman	(substituted off) 66'
Replacements:
HK	16	Fraser Brown	(substituted on) 59'
PR	17	Jamie Bhatti	(substituted on) 66'
PR	18	Simon Berghan	(substituted on) 59'
LK	19	Jonny Gray	(substituted on) 66'
FL	20	Jack Dempsey	(substituted on) 59'
SH	21	George Horne	(substituted on) 70'
FH	22	Blair Kinghorn	(substituted on) 66'
CE	23	Chris Harris	(substituted on) 76'
Coach:
(Scotland) Gregor Townsend

Player of the Match:
Duhan van der Merwe (Scotland)

Assistant referees:
Ben O'Keeffe (New Zealand)
James Doleman (New Zealand)
Television match official:
Brendon Pickerill (New Zealand)

Notes:

- Ollie Hassell-Collins (England) made his international debut.
- Scotland retained the Calcutta Cup.
- Scotland won three consecutive games against England for the first time since 1972, and registered successive away wins against England for the first time since 1909.
- With this win, Scotland moved up to fifth in the World Rugby Rankings, equalling their highest position, last set in May 2018.

5 February 2023
16:00 CET (UTC+1)

(1 BP) Italy	24–29	France (1 BP)
Try: Capuozzo 32' m Penalty try 51'; Pen: Allan (4/5) 14', 23', 40+2', 62'	Report	Try: Flament 5' c Ramos 19' m Dumortier 27' c Jalibert 67' c Con: Ramos (3/4) 6', 28', 68'; Pen: Ramos (1/2) 47'

Stadio Olimpico, Rome
Attendance: 41,232
Referee: Matthew Carley (England)

FB	15	Ange Capuozzo
RW	14	Pierre Bruno	(substituted off) 67'
OC	13	Ignacio Brex
IC	12	Luca Morisi
LW	11	Tommaso Menoncello
FH	10	Tommaso Allan
SH	9	Stephen Varney	(substituted off) 75'
N8	8	Lorenzo Cannone	(substituted off) 69'
OF	7	Michele Lamaro (c)
BF	6	Sebastian Negri	(substituted off) 66'
RL	5	Federico Ruzza
LL	4	Niccolò Cannone	(substituted off) 69'
TP	3	Simone Ferrari	(substituted off) 57'
HK	2	Giacomo Nicotera	(substituted off) 69'
LP	1	Danilo Fischetti	(substituted off) 69'
Replacements:
HK	16	Luca Bigi	(substituted on) 69'
PR	17	Federico Zani	(substituted on) 69'
PR	18	Pietro Ceccarelli	(substituted on) 57'
LK	19	Edoardo Iachizzi	(substituted on) 69'
FL	20	Giovanni Pettinelli	(substituted on) 69'
FL	21	Manuel Zuliani	(substituted on) 66'
SH	22	Alessandro Fusco	(substituted on) 75'
FB	23	Edoardo Padovani	(substituted on) 67'
Coach:
(New Zealand) Kieran Crowley

FB	15	Thomas Ramos
RW	14	Damian Penaud
OC	13	Gaël Fickou
IC	12	Yoram Moefana
LW	11	Ethan Dumortier
FH	10	Romain Ntamack		(substituted off) 65'
SH	9	Antoine Dupont (c)
N8	8	Grégory Alldritt		(substituted off) 62'
OF	7	Charles Ollivon	(yellow card) 52'
BF	6	Anthony Jelonch
RL	5	Paul Willemse		(substituted off) 54'
LL	4	Thibaud Flament
TP	3	Uini Atonio		(substituted off) 52'
HK	2	Julien Marchand		(substituted off) 62'
LP	1	Cyril Baille		(substituted off) 52'
Replacements:
HK	16	Gaëtan Barlot		(substituted on) 62'
PR	17	Reda Wardi		(substituted on) 52'
PR	18	Sipili Falatea		(substituted on) 52'
LK	19	Romain Taofifénua		(substituted on) 54'
LK	20	Thomas Lavault
FL	21	Sekou Macalou		(substituted on) 62'
SH	22	Nolann Le Garrec
FH	23	Matthieu Jalibert		(substituted on) 65'
Coach:
(France) Fabien Galthié

Player of the Match:
Antoine Dupont (France)

Assistant referees:
Nic Berry (Australia)
Jordan Way (Australia)
Television match official:
Ben Whitehouse (Wales)

Notes:

- Edoardo Iachizzi (Italy) and Ethan Dumortier (France) made their international debuts.
- France retained the Giuseppe Garibaldi Trophy.

=== Round 2 ===
11 February 2023
14:15 WET (UTC+0)

(1 BP) Ireland	32–19	France
Try: Keenan 8' c Lowe 21' m Porter 26' c Ringrose 71' c Con: Sexton (2/3) 10', 26'; Byrne (1/1) 73'; Pen: Sexton (1/1) 40'; Byrne (1/1) 59'	Report	Try: Penaud 17' c Con: Ramos (1/1) 18'; Pen: Ramos (3/4) 4', 14', 32'; Drop: Ramos (1/1) 61'

Aviva Stadium, Dublin
Attendance: 51,700
Referee: Wayne Barnes (England)

FB	15	Hugo Keenan
RW	14	Mack Hansen
OC	13	Garry Ringrose
IC	12	Stuart McCloskey	(substituted off) 65'
LW	11	James Lowe
FH	10	Johnny Sexton (c)	(substituted off) 47'
SH	9	Conor Murray	(substituted off) 51'
N8	8	Caelan Doris
OF	7	Josh van der Flier
BF	6	Peter O'Mahony	(substituted off) 51'
RL	5	James Ryan
LL	4	Tadhg Beirne	(substituted off) 45'
TP	3	Finlay Bealham	(substituted off) 61'
HK	2	Rob Herring	(substituted off) 25'
LP	1	Andrew Porter	(substituted off) 69'
Replacements:
HK	16	Rónan Kelleher	(substituted on) 25'
PR	17	Dave Kilcoyne	(substituted on) 69'
PR	18	Tom O'Toole	(substituted on) 61'
LK	19	Iain Henderson	(substituted on) 45'
N8	20	Jack Conan	(substituted on) 56'
SH	21	Craig Casey	(substituted on) 56'
FH	22	Ross Byrne	(substituted on) 47'
CE	23	Bundee Aki	(substituted on) 65'
Coach:
(England) Andy Farrell

FB	15	Thomas Ramos		(substituted off) 61'
RW	14	Damian Penaud
OC	13	Gaël Fickou
IC	12	Yoram Moefana		(substituted off) 25'	(substituted on) 37'
LW	11	Ethan Dumortier
FH	10	Romain Ntamack
SH	9	Antoine Dupont (c)
N8	8	Grégory Alldritt		(substituted off) 51'
OF	7	Charles Ollivon		(substituted off) 69'
BF	6	Anthony Jelonch
RL	5	Paul Willemse		(substituted off) 45'
LL	4	Thibaud Flament
TP	3	Uini Atonio	(yellow card) 24'			(substituted off) 51'
HK	2	Julien Marchand		(substituted off) 73'
LP	1	Cyril Baille		(substituted off) 51'
Replacements:
HK	16	Gaëtan Barlot		(substituted on) 73'
PR	17	Reda Wardi		(substituted on) 51'
PR	18	Sipili Falatea		(substituted on) 25'	(substituted off) 37'	(substituted on) 51'
LK	19	Romain Taofifénua		(substituted on) 45'
FL	20	François Cros		(substituted on) 69'
FL	21	Sekou Macalou		(substituted on) 51'
SH	22	Baptiste Couilloud
FH	23	Matthieu Jalibert		(substituted on) 61'
Coach:
(France) Fabien Galthié

Player of the Match:
Caelan Doris (Ireland)

Assistant referees:
Matthew Carley (England)
Jordan Way (Australia)
Television match official:
Brendon Pickerill (New Zealand)

Notes:

- Dave Kilcoyne, Andrew Porter and James Ryan (all Ireland) earned their 50th international test caps.
- Prior to this game, Ireland were ranked 1st in the men's World Rugby Rankings and France were 2nd, the first time that a Six Nations Championship match had brought the world's top two teams together.
- This was Ireland's 13th consecutive win at home, their longest consecutive run of home victories.
- Ireland brought to an end France's 14-match unbeaten run dating back to November 2021.

11 February 2023
16:45 GMT (UTC+0)

(1 BP) Scotland	35–7	Wales
Try: Turner 29' c Steyn (2) 50' c, 57' m Kinghorn 70' m M. Fagerson 78' m Con: Russell (2/5) 31', 52'; Pen: Russell (2/2) 8', 14'	Report	Try: Owens 33' c Con: Biggar (1/1) 35'

Murrayfield Stadium, Edinburgh
Attendance: 67,144
Referee: Andrew Brace (Ireland)

FB	15	Stuart Hogg		(substituted off) 13'
RW	14	Kyle Steyn
OC	13	Huw Jones
IC	12	Sione Tuipulotu		(substituted off) 71'
LW	11	Duhan van der Merwe
FH	10	Finn Russell
SH	9	Ben White		(substituted off) 58'
N8	8	Matt Fagerson
OF	7	Luke Crosbie		(substituted off) 36'	(substituted on) 42'	(substituted off) 44'
BF	6	Jamie Ritchie (c)
RL	5	Grant Gilchrist		(substituted off) 64'
LL	4	Richie Gray
TP	3	Zander Fagerson		(substituted off) 64'
HK	2	George Turner	(yellow card) 32'			(substituted off) 58'
LP	1	Pierre Schoeman		(substituted off) 64'
Replacements:
HK	16	Fraser Brown		(substituted on) 36'	(substituted off) 42'	(substituted on) 58'
PR	17	Jamie Bhatti		(substituted on) 64'
PR	18	WP Nel		(substituted on) 64'
LK	19	Jonny Gray		(substituted on) 64'
FL	20	Jack Dempsey				(substituted on) 44'
SH	21	George Horne		(substituted on) 58'
FH	22	Blair Kinghorn		(substituted on) 13'
CE	23	Chris Harris		(substituted on) 71'
Coach:
(Scotland) Gregor Townsend

FB	15	Liam Williams	(yellow card) 56'
RW	14	Josh Adams				(substituted off) 58'
OC	13	George North		(substituted off) 33'	(substituted on) 40'
IC	12	Joe Hawkins
LW	11	Rio Dyer
FH	10	Dan Biggar		(substituted off) 56'
SH	9	Tomos Williams		(substituted off) 56'
N8	8	Jac Morgan		(substituted off) 52'
OF	7	Tommy Reffell
BF	6	Christ Tshiunza
RL	5	Adam Beard
LL	4	Dafydd Jenkins		(substituted off) 65'
TP	3	Dillon Lewis		(substituted off) 64'
HK	2	Ken Owens (c)		(substituted off) 64'
LP	1	Wyn Jones		(substituted off) 52'
Replacements:
HK	16	Scott Baldwin		(substituted on) 64'
PR	17	Rhys Carré		(substituted on) 52'
PR	18	Leon Brown		(substituted on) 64'
LK	19	Rhys Davies		(substituted on) 65'
N8	20	Taulupe Faletau		(substituted on) 52'
SH	21	Rhys Webb	(yellow card) 82'	(substituted on) 56'
FH	22	Rhys Patchell		(substituted on) 56'
WG	23	Alex Cuthbert		(substituted on) 33'	(substituted off) 40'	(substituted on) 58'
Coach:
(New Zealand) Warren Gatland

Player of the Match:
Finn Russell (Scotland)

Assistant referees:
Frank Murphy (Ireland)
Chris Busby (Ireland)
Television match official:
Brian MacNeice (Ireland)

Notes:

- Rhys Davies (Wales) made his international debut.
- Stuart Hogg (Scotland) earned his 100th international cap (98 for Scotland, 2 for the British & Irish Lions).
- This was Scotland's biggest win over Wales, surpassing the 25-point winning margin set in 1924.
- Scotland won back-to-back matches in the opening rounds of the Six Nations for the first time.
- Wales lost their opening two Six Nations games for the first time since 2007.
- Scotland reclaimed the Doddie Weir Cup.

12 February 2023
15:00 GMT (UTC+0)

(1 BP) England	31–14	Italy
Try: Willis 12' c Chessum 27' c George 36' m Penalty try 49'; Arundell 69' m Con: Farrell (2/4) 13', 28'	Report	Try: Riccioni 43' c Fusco 63' c Con: Allan (2/2) 43', 63'

Twickenham Stadium, London
Attendance: 81,609
Referee: James Doleman (New Zealand)

FB	15	Freddie Steward
RW	14	Max Malins
OC	13	Henry Slade	(substituted off) 72'
IC	12	Ollie Lawrence
LW	11	Ollie Hassell-Collins	(substituted off) 54'
FH	10	Owen Farrell (c)
SH	9	Jack van Poortvliet	(substituted off) 59'
N8	8	Alex Dombrandt	(substituted off) 65'
OF	7	Jack Willis	(substituted off) 52'
BF	6	Lewis Ludlam
RL	5	Ollie Chessum
LL	4	Maro Itoje
TP	3	Kyle Sinckler	(substituted off) 49'
HK	2	Jamie George	(substituted off) 73'
LP	1	Ellis Genge	(substituted off) 54'
Replacements:
HK	16	Jack Walker	(substituted on) 73'
PR	17	Mako Vunipola	(substituted on) 54'
PR	18	Dan Cole	(substituted on) 49'
LK	19	Nick Isiekwe	(substituted on) 65'
FL	20	Ben Earl	(substituted on) 52'
SH	21	Alex Mitchell	(substituted on) 59'
FH	22	Marcus Smith	(substituted on) 72'
FB	23	Henry Arundell	(substituted on) 54'
Coach:
(England) Steve Borthwick

FB	15	Ange Capuozzo
RW	14	Edoardo Padovani
OC	13	Ignacio Brex
IC	12	Luca Morisi		(substituted off) 46'
LW	11	Tommaso Menoncello
FH	10	Tommaso Allan
SH	9	Stephen Varney		(substituted off) 62'
N8	8	Lorenzo Cannone	(yellow card) 26'	(substituted off) 56'	(substituted on) 78'
OF	7	Michele Lamaro (c)		(substituted off) 23'
BF	6	Sebastian Negri			(substituted off) 54'	(substituted on) 60'
RL	5	Federico Ruzza
LL	4	Niccolò Cannone		(substituted off) 74'	(substituted on) 80'
TP	3	Marco Riccioni		(substituted off) 47'	(substituted on) 54'	(substituted off) 60'
HK	2	Giacomo Nicotera		(substituted off) 60'
LP	1	Danilo Fischetti		(substituted off) 54'
Replacements:
HK	16	Luca Bigi		(substituted on) 60'
PR	17	Federico Zani		(substituted on) 54'
PR	18	Simone Ferrari	(yellow card) 49'	(substituted on) 47'
LK	19	Edoardo Iachizzi		(substituted on) 74'
N8	20	Jake Polledri		(substituted on) 56'	(substituted off) 80'
FL	21	Manuel Zuliani		(substituted on) 23'	(substituted off) 78'
SH	22	Alessandro Fusco		(substituted on) 62'
WG	23	Pierre Bruno		(substituted on) 46'
Coach:
(New Zealand) Kieran Crowley

Player of the Match:
Ollie Lawrence (England)

Assistant referees:
Mathieu Raynal (France)
Tual Trainini (France)
Television match official:
Eric Gauzins (France)

Notes:

- Jack Walker (England) made his international debut.
- Dan Cole (England) earned his 100th international cap (97 for England, 3 for the British & Irish Lions).

=== Round 3 ===
25 February 2023
15:15 CET (UTC+1)

Italy	20–34	Ireland (1 BP)
Try: Varney 6' c Bruno 40' c Con: P. Garbisi (2/2) 7', 40'; Pen: P. Garbisi (2/2) 18', 55'	Report	Try: Ryan 2' m Keenan 12' c Aki 19' c Hansen (2) 34' m, 70' c Con: Byrne (3/5) 13', 21', 71'; Pen: Byrne (1/1) 64'

Stadio Olimpico, Rome
Attendance: 51,034
Referee: Mike Adamson (Scotland)

FB	15	Ange Capuozzo
RW	14	Edoardo Padovani
OC	13	Ignacio Brex
IC	12	Tommaso Menoncello	(substituted off) 77'
LW	11	Pierre Bruno
FH	10	Paolo Garbisi	(substituted off) 72'
SH	9	Stephen Varney	(substituted off) 67'
N8	8	Lorenzo Cannone	(substituted off) 64'
OF	7	Michele Lamaro (c)
BF	6	Sebastian Negri
RL	5	Federico Ruzza
LL	4	Niccolò Cannone	(substituted off) 64'
TP	3	Simone Ferrari	(substituted off) 46'
HK	2	Giacomo Nicotera	(substituted off) 30'	(substituted on) 40'	(substituted off) 60'
LP	1	Danilo Fischetti	(substituted off) 60'
Replacements:
HK	16	Luca Bigi	(substituted on) 30'	(substituted off) 40'	(substituted on) 60'
PR	17	Federico Zani	(substituted on) 60'
PR	18	Marco Riccioni	(substituted on) 46'
LK	19	Edoardo Iachizzi	(substituted on) 64'
FL	20	Giovanni Pettinelli	(substituted on) 64'
SH	21	Alessandro Fusco	(substituted on) 67'
CE	22	Luca Morisi	(substituted on) 77'
FH	23	Tommaso Allan	(substituted on) 72'
Coach:
(New Zealand) Kieran Crowley

FB	15	Hugo Keenan
RW	14	Mack Hansen
OC	13	Bundee Aki
IC	12	Stuart McCloskey	(substituted off) 72'
LW	11	James Lowe
FH	10	Ross Byrne	(substituted off) 77'
SH	9	Craig Casey	(substituted off) 64'
N8	8	Jack Conan	(substituted off) 56'
OF	7	Josh van der Flier
BF	6	Caelan Doris
RL	5	James Ryan (c)
LL	4	Iain Henderson	(substituted off) 52'
TP	3	Finlay Bealham	(substituted off) 36'
HK	2	Rónan Kelleher	(substituted off) 56'
LP	1	Andrew Porter	(substituted off) 64'
Replacements:
HK	16	Dan Sheehan	(substituted on) 56'
PR	17	Dave Kilcoyne	(substituted on) 64'
PR	18	Tom O'Toole	(substituted on) 36'
LK	19	Ryan Baird	(substituted on) 52'
FL	20	Peter O'Mahony	(substituted on) 56'
SH	21	Conor Murray	(substituted on) 64'
FH	22	Jack Crowley	(substituted on) 77'
WG	23	Jimmy O'Brien	(substituted on) 72'
Coach:
(England) Andy Farrell

Player of the Match:
Mack Hansen (Ireland)

Assistant referees:
Wayne Barnes (England)
Craig Evans (Wales)
Television match official:
Marius Jonker (South Africa)

Notes:

- Garry Ringrose (Ireland) was originally named to start at outside centre, but withdrew the day before the match due to injury. He was replaced in the starting line-up by Stuart McCloskey, who started at inside centre with Bundee Aki moving to outside centre. McCloskey's place on the bench was taken by Jimmy O'Brien.

25 February 2023
16:45 GMT (UTC+0)

Wales	10–20	England
Try: Rees-Zammit 40' c Con: Halfpenny (1/1) 41'; Pen: Halfpenny (1/1) 21'	Report	Try: Watson 18' m Sinckler 44' c Lawrence 74' m Con: Farrell (1/3) 44'; Pen: Farrell (1/3) 9'

Millennium Stadium, Cardiff
Attendance: 74,007
Referee: Mathieu Raynal (France)

FB	15	Leigh Halfpenny
RW	14	Josh Adams	(substituted off) 54'
OC	13	Mason Grady
IC	12	Joe Hawkins
LW	11	Louis Rees-Zammit
FH	10	Owen Williams	(substituted off) 54'
SH	9	Tomos Williams	(substituted off) 68'
N8	8	Taulupe Faletau
OF	7	Justin Tipuric
BF	6	Christ Tshiunza	(substituted off) 63'
RL	5	Alun Wyn Jones	(substituted off) 63'
LL	4	Adam Beard
TP	3	Tomas Francis	(substituted off) 55'
HK	2	Ken Owens (c)	(substituted off) 68'
LP	1	Gareth Thomas	(substituted off) 55'
Replacements:
HK	16	Bradley Roberts	(substituted on) 68'
PR	17	Rhys Carré	(substituted on) 55'
PR	18	Dillon Lewis	(substituted on) 55'
LK	19	Dafydd Jenkins	(substituted on) 63'
FL	20	Tommy Reffell	(substituted on) 63'
SH	21	Kieran Hardy	(substituted on) 68'
FH	22	Dan Biggar	(substituted on) 54'
CE	23	Nick Tompkins	(substituted on) 54'
Coach:
(New Zealand) Warren Gatland

FB	15	Freddie Steward
RW	14	Max Malins	(substituted off) 79'
OC	13	Henry Slade
IC	12	Ollie Lawrence
LW	11	Anthony Watson
FH	10	Owen Farrell (c)	(substituted off) 79'
SH	9	Jack van Poortvliet	(substituted off) 72'
N8	8	Alex Dombrandt	(substituted off) 68'
OF	7	Jack Willis	(substituted off) 59'
BF	6	Lewis Ludlam
RL	5	Ollie Chessum
LL	4	Maro Itoje
TP	3	Kyle Sinckler	(substituted off) 64'
HK	2	Jamie George	(substituted off) 79'
LP	1	Ellis Genge	(substituted off) 54'
Replacements:
HK	16	Jack Walker	(substituted on) 79'
PR	17	Mako Vunipola	(substituted on) 54'
PR	18	Dan Cole	(substituted on) 64'
LK	19	Courtney Lawes	(substituted on) 68'
FL	20	Ben Curry	(substituted on) 59'
SH	21	Alex Mitchell	(substituted on) 72'
FH	22	Marcus Smith	(substituted on) 79'
FB	23	Henry Arundell	(substituted on) 79'
Coach:
(England) Steve Borthwick

Player of the Match:
Freddie Steward (England)

Assistant referees:
Andrew Brace (Ireland)
Chris Busby (Ireland)
Television match official:
Brian MacNeice (Ireland)

Notes:

- Mason Grady (Wales) made his international debut.
- England won in Cardiff for the first time since their 21–16 victory in 2017.
- Wales fell to tenth in the World Rugby Rankings, equalling their worst-ever placement.

26 February 2023
16:00 CET (UTC+1)

(1 BP) France	32–21	Scotland
Try: Ntamack 4' c Dumortier 7' m Ramos 18' c Fickou 79' c Con: Ramos (3/4) 5', 20', 80+1'; Pen: Ramos (2/2) 35', 57'	Report	Try: Jones (2) 25' c, 47' c Russell 67' c Con: Russell (3/3) 25', 48', 68'

Stade de France, Saint-Denis
Attendance: 80,000
Referee: Nika Amashukeli (Georgia)

FB	15	Thomas Ramos
RW	14	Damian Penaud
OC	13	Gaël Fickou
IC	12	Yoram Moefana
LW	11	Ethan Dumortier
FH	10	Romain Ntamack		(substituted off) 68'
SH	9	Antoine Dupont (c)
N8	8	Grégory Alldritt		(substituted off) 12'
OF	7	Charles Ollivon
BF	6	Anthony Jelonch		(substituted off) 6'	(substituted on) 13'	(substituted off) 24'
RL	5	Paul Willemse		(substituted off) 53'
LL	4	Thibaud Flament
TP	3	Mohamed Haouas	(red card) 12'
HK	2	Julien Marchand		(substituted off) 68'
LP	1	Cyril Baille		(substituted off) 62'
Replacements:
HK	16	Gaëtan Barlot		(substituted on) 68'
PR	17	Reda Wardi		(substituted on) 62'
PR	18	Sipili Falatea		(substituted on) 12'
LK	19	Romain Taofifénua		(substituted on) 53'
FL	20	François Cros		(substituted on) 6'	(substituted off) 13'	(substituted on) 24'
FL	21	Sekou Macalou
SH	22	Baptiste Couilloud
FH	23	Matthieu Jalibert		(substituted on) 68'
Coach:
(France) Fabien Galthié

FB	15	Stuart Hogg
RW	14	Kyle Steyn		(substituted off) 68'
OC	13	Huw Jones
IC	12	Sione Tuipulotu
LW	11	Duhan van der Merwe
FH	10	Finn Russell
SH	9	Ben White		(substituted off) 57'
N8	8	Matt Fagerson		(substituted off) 57'
OF	7	Hamish Watson		(substituted off) 10'
BF	6	Jamie Ritchie (c)
RL	5	Grant Gilchrist	(red card) 7'
LL	4	Richie Gray		(substituted off) 70'
TP	3	Zander Fagerson		(substituted off) 63'
HK	2	George Turner		(substituted off) 63'
LP	1	Pierre Schoeman		(substituted off) 63'
Replacements:
HK	16	Fraser Brown		(substituted on) 63'
PR	17	Jamie Bhatti		(substituted on) 63'
PR	18	WP Nel		(substituted on) 63'
LK	19	Jonny Gray		(substituted on) 10'
LK	20	Sam Skinner		(substituted on) 70'
FL	21	Jack Dempsey		(substituted on) 57'
SH	22	Ali Price		(substituted on) 57'
FH	23	Blair Kinghorn		(substituted on) 68'
Coach:
(Scotland) Gregor Townsend

Player of the Match:
Gaël Fickou (France)

Assistant referees:
Karl Dickson (England)
Andrea Piardi (Italy)
Television match official:
Ben Whitehouse (Wales)

Notes:

- France retained the Auld Alliance Trophy.
- Mohamed Haouas (France) became the first player to receive two career red cards in Six Nations Championship matches, his first also coming against Scotland in 2020.
- This was the 100th meeting between France and Scotland.

=== Round 4 ===
11 March 2023
15:15 CET (UTC+1)

Italy	17–29	Wales (1 BP)
Try: Negri 42' c Brex 67' c Con: Allan (2/2) 43', 67'; Pen: Allan (1/1) 15'	Report	Try: Dyer 8' c L. Williams 17' m Penalty try 33'; Faletau 49' c Con: O. Williams (2/3) 9', 50'; Pen: O. Williams (1/1) 6'

Stadio Olimpico, Rome
Attendance: 61,536
Referee: Damon Murphy (Australia)

FB	15	Tommaso Allan
RW	14	Edoardo Padovani
OC	13	Ignacio Brex
IC	12	Tommaso Menoncello		(substituted off) 59'
LW	11	Pierre Bruno	(yellow card) 44'
FH	10	Paolo Garbisi
SH	9	Stephen Varney		(substituted off) 56'
N8	8	Lorenzo Cannone	(yellow card) 33'	(substituted off) 60'
OF	7	Michele Lamaro (c)		(substituted off) 76'
BF	6	Sebastian Negri		(substituted off) 52'
RL	5	Federico Ruzza
LL	4	Niccolò Cannone
TP	3	Simone Ferrari		(substituted off) 32'	(substituted on) 38'	(substituted off) 48'
HK	2	Giacomo Nicotera		(substituted off) 52'
LP	1	Danilo Fischetti		(substituted off) 61'
Replacements:
HK	16	Luca Bigi		(substituted on) 52'
PR	17	Federico Zani		(substituted on) 61'
PR	18	Marco Riccioni		(substituted on) 32'	(substituted off) 38'	(substituted on) 48'
LK	19	Edoardo Iachizzi		(substituted on) 60'
FL	20	Giovanni Pettinelli		(substituted on) 76'
FL	21	Manuel Zuliani		(substituted on) 52'
SH	22	Alessandro Fusco		(substituted on) 56'
CE	23	Luca Morisi		(substituted on) 59'
Coach:
(New Zealand) Kieran Crowley

FB	15	Liam Williams	(substituted off) 61'
RW	14	Josh Adams	(substituted off) 51'
OC	13	Mason Grady
IC	12	Joe Hawkins
LW	11	Rio Dyer
FH	10	Owen Williams
SH	9	Rhys Webb	(substituted off) 53'
N8	8	Taulupe Faletau
OF	7	Justin Tipuric
BF	6	Jac Morgan	(substituted off) 59'
RL	5	Dafydd Jenkins	(substituted off) 68'
LL	4	Adam Beard
TP	3	Tomas Francis	(substituted off) 52'
HK	2	Ken Owens (c)	(substituted off) 68'	(substituted on) 73'
LP	1	Wyn Jones	(substituted off) 45'
Replacements:
HK	16	Scott Baldwin	(substituted on) 68'	(substituted off) 73'
PR	17	Gareth Thomas	(substituted on) 45'
PR	18	Dillon Lewis	(substituted on) 52'
LK	19	Rhys Davies	(substituted on) 68'
FL	20	Tommy Reffell	(substituted on) 59'
SH	21	Tomos Williams	(substituted on) 53'
CE	22	George North	(substituted on) 61'
WG	23	Louis Rees-Zammit	(substituted on) 51'
Coach:
(New Zealand) Warren Gatland

Player of the Match:
Rhys Webb (Wales)

Assistant referees:
Karl Dickson (England)
Chris Busby (Ireland)
Television match official:
Joy Neville (Ireland)

11 March 2023
16:45 GMT (UTC+0)

England	10–53	France (1 BP)
Try: Steward 47' c Con: Smith (1/1) 48'; Pen: Smith (1/1) 33'	Report	Try: Ramos 1' c Flament (2) 25' c, 56' c Ollivon (2) 40' c, 59' c Penaud (2) 71' c, 74' m Con: Ramos (6/7) 3', 26', 42', 58', 60', 72'; Pen: Ramos (2/2) 6', 35'

Twickenham Stadium, London
Attendance: 82,000
Referee: Ben O'Keeffe (New Zealand)

FB	15	Freddie Steward
RW	14	Max Malins	(substituted off) 58'
OC	13	Henry Slade	(substituted off) 45'
IC	12	Ollie Lawrence	(substituted off) 60'
LW	11	Anthony Watson
FH	10	Marcus Smith
SH	9	Jack van Poortvliet	(substituted off) 45'
N8	8	Alex Dombrandt	(substituted off) 75'
OF	7	Jack Willis	(substituted off) 52'
BF	6	Lewis Ludlam
RL	5	Ollie Chessum
LL	4	Maro Itoje
TP	3	Kyle Sinckler	(substituted off) 64'
HK	2	Jamie George
LP	1	Ellis Genge (c)	(substituted off) 64'
Replacements:
HK	16	Jack Walker	(substituted on) 60'
PR	17	Mako Vunipola	(substituted on) 64'
PR	18	Dan Cole	(substituted on) 64'
LK	19	David Ribbans	(substituted on) 75'
FL	20	Ben Curry	(substituted on) 52'
SH	21	Alex Mitchell	(substituted on) 45'
FH	22	Owen Farrell	(substituted on) 45'
FB	23	Henry Arundell	(substituted on) 58'
Coach:
(England) Steve Borthwick

FB	15	Thomas Ramos
RW	14	Damian Penaud
OC	13	Gaël Fickou
IC	12	Jonathan Danty	(substituted off) 64'
LW	11	Ethan Dumortier
FH	10	Romain Ntamack	(substituted off) 73'
SH	9	Antoine Dupont (c)	(substituted off) 68'
N8	8	Grégory Alldritt
OF	7	Charles Ollivon	(substituted off) 62'
BF	6	François Cros
RL	5	Paul Willemse	(substituted off) 49'
LL	4	Thibaud Flament
TP	3	Dorian Aldegheri	(substituted off) 49'
HK	2	Julien Marchand	(substituted off) 60'
LP	1	Cyril Baille	(substituted off) 60'
Replacements:
HK	16	Peato Mauvaka	(substituted on) 60'
PR	17	Reda Wardi	(substituted on) 60'
PR	18	Sipili Falatea	(substituted on) 49'
LK	19	Romain Taofifénua	(substituted on) 49'
FL	20	Sekou Macalou	(substituted on) 62'
SH	21	Maxime Lucu	(substituted on) 68'
CE	22	Yoram Moefana	(substituted on) 64'
FB	23	Melvyn Jaminet	(substituted on) 73'
Coach:
(France) Fabien Galthié

Player of the Match:
Thomas Ramos (France)

Assistant referees:
Jaco Peyper (South Africa)
Andrea Piardi (Italy)
Television match official:
Brett Cronan (Australia)

Notes:

- France won against England at Twickenham for the first time since 2007, and in a Six Nations match at Twickenham for the first time since 2005.
- France scored their most points against England (previously 37 points in 1972) to set a new record winning margin over England (previously 25 last set in 2006).
- This was England's heaviest defeat at home (43-point difference), surpassing the 36 points to South Africa in 2008, and was the most points they had conceded at home, surpassing the 42 points conceded in the same game.
- This was England's heaviest defeat in any Home, Five or Six Nations match, surpassing the 43–13 loss to Ireland in 2007, and the most points conceded (surpassing the same game).

12 March 2023
15:00 GMT (UTC+0)

Scotland	7–22	Ireland
Try: Jones 16' c Con: Russell (1/1) 17'	Report	Try: Hansen 27' m Lowe 56' c Conan 61' c Con: Sexton (2/3) 57', 62'; Pen: Sexton (1/1) 12'

Murrayfield Stadium, Edinburgh
Attendance: 67,144
Referee: Luke Pearce (England)

FB	15	Stuart Hogg	(substituted off) 64'
RW	14	Kyle Steyn
OC	13	Huw Jones
IC	12	Sione Tuipulotu
LW	11	Duhan van der Merwe
FH	10	Finn Russell	(substituted off) 80'
SH	9	Ben White	(substituted off) 58'
N8	8	Jack Dempsey
OF	7	Jamie Ritchie (c)
BF	6	Matt Fagerson	(substituted off) 66'
RL	5	Jonny Gray
LL	4	Richie Gray	(substituted off) 5'
TP	3	Zander Fagerson	(substituted off) 53'
HK	2	George Turner	(substituted off) 58'
LP	1	Pierre Schoeman	(substituted off) 53'
Replacements:
HK	16	Fraser Brown	(substituted on) 58'
PR	17	Jamie Bhatti	(substituted on) 53'
PR	18	Simon Berghan	(substituted on) 53'
LK	19	Scott Cummings	(substituted on) 5'
FL	20	Hamish Watson	(substituted on) 66'
SH	21	Ali Price	(substituted on) 58'
FH	22	Blair Kinghorn	(substituted on) 64'
CE	23	Chris Harris	(substituted on) 80'
Coach:
(Scotland) Gregor Townsend

FB	15	Hugo Keenan
RW	14	Mack Hansen
OC	13	Garry Ringrose		(substituted off) 72'
IC	12	Bundee Aki	(substituted off) 66'	(substituted on) 72'
LW	11	James Lowe
FH	10	Johnny Sexton (c)	(substituted off) 70'
SH	9	Conor Murray	(substituted off) 53'
N8	8	Caelan Doris	(substituted off) 12'
OF	7	Josh van der Flier
BF	6	Peter O'Mahony
RL	5	James Ryan
LL	4	Iain Henderson	(substituted off) 23'
TP	3	Tadhg Furlong	(substituted off) 64'
HK	2	Dan Sheehan	(substituted off) 18'
LP	1	Andrew Porter
Replacements:
HK	16	Rónan Kelleher	(substituted on) 18'	(substituted off) 48'
PR	17	Cian Healy		(substituted on) 48'
PR	18	Tom O'Toole	(substituted on) 64'
LK	19	Ryan Baird	(substituted on) 23'
N8	20	Jack Conan	(substituted on) 12'
SH	21	Jamison Gibson-Park	(substituted on) 53'
FH	22	Ross Byrne	(substituted on) 70'
CE	23	Robbie Henshaw	(substituted on) 66'
Coach:
(England) Andy Farrell

Player of the Match:
Mack Hansen (Ireland)

Assistant referees:
Wayne Barnes (England)
Christophe Ridley (England)
Television match official:
Stuart Terheege (England)

Notes:

- Stuart Hogg (Scotland) became the fourth Scotsman to earn his 100th test cap for Scotland.
- Garry Ringrose (Ireland) earned his 50th international test cap.
- Johnny Sexton (Ireland) matched Ronan O'Gara's record as the leading point scorer in Six Nations Championship (557 points).
- Ireland retained the Centenary Quaich.
- Ireland become the first team to record 80 wins across all editions of the Six Nations Championship.

=== Round 5 ===
18 March 2023
12:30 GMT (UTC+0)

(1 BP) Scotland	26–14	Italy
Try: Van der Merwe 12' m Kinghorn (3) 29' c, 43' c, 80' c Con: Kinghorn (3/4) 30', 45', 80+1'	Report	Try: Allan 61' m Pen: Allan (2/2) 7', 15'; P. Garbisi (1/1) 65'

Murrayfield Stadium, Edinburgh
Attendance: 67,144
Referee: Angus Gardner (Australia)

FB	15	Ollie Smith	(substituted off) 67'
RW	14	Kyle Steyn
OC	13	Huw Jones
IC	12	Sione Tuipulotu	(substituted off) 67'
LW	11	Duhan van der Merwe
FH	10	Blair Kinghorn
SH	9	Ben White	(substituted off) 59'
N8	8	Jack Dempsey
OF	7	Hamish Watson	(substituted off) 50'
BF	6	Jamie Ritchie (c)
RL	5	Jonny Gray	(substituted off) 59'
LL	4	Sam Skinner
TP	3	Zander Fagerson	(substituted off) 70'
HK	2	George Turner	(substituted off) 50'
LP	1	Pierre Schoeman	(substituted off) 59'
Replacements:
HK	16	Ewan Ashman	(substituted on) 50'
PR	17	Rory Sutherland	(substituted on) 59'
PR	18	WP Nel	(substituted on) 70'
LK	19	Scott Cummings	(substituted on) 59'
FL	20	Matt Fagerson	(substituted on) 50'
SH	21	Ali Price	(substituted on) 59'
FH	22	Ben Healy	(substituted on) 67'
CE	23	Cameron Redpath	(substituted on) 67'
Coach:
(Scotland) Gregor Townsend

FB	15	Tommaso Allan
RW	14	Pierre Bruno
OC	13	Ignacio Brex
IC	12	Luca Morisi		(substituted off) 70'
LW	11	Simone Gesi		(substituted off) 28'	(substituted on) 39'
FH	10	Paolo Garbisi
SH	9	Alessandro Fusco		(substituted off) 50'
N8	8	Lorenzo Cannone		(substituted off) 59'
OF	7	Michele Lamaro (c)
BF	6	Sebastian Negri		(substituted off) 45'
RL	5	Federico Ruzza
LL	4	Edoardo Iachizzi		(substituted off) 22'	(substituted on) 32'	(substituted off) 45'
TP	3	Marco Riccioni	(yellow card) 28'			(substituted off) 56'	(substituted on) 78'
HK	2	Giacomo Nicotera		(substituted off) 72'
LP	1	Danilo Fischetti		(substituted off) 56'
Replacements:
HK	16	Marco Manfredi		(substituted on) 72'
PR	17	Federico Zani		(substituted on) 56'
PR	18	Pietro Ceccarelli		(substituted on) 28'	(substituted off) 39'	(substituted on) 56'	(substituted off) 78'
LK	19	Niccolò Cannone		(substituted on) 22'	(substituted off) 32'	(substituted on) 45'
FL	20	Giovanni Pettinelli		(substituted on) 59'
FL	21	Manuel Zuliani		(substituted on) 45'
SH	22	Alessandro Garbisi		(substituted on) 50'
CE	23	Marco Zanon		(substituted on) 70'
Coach:
(New Zealand) Kieran Crowley

Player of the Match:
Jack Dempsey (Scotland)

Assistant referees:
Matthew Carley (England)
Craig Evans (Wales)
Television match official:
Brett Cronan (Australia)

Notes:

- Ben Healy (Scotland), Simone Gesi and Marco Manfredi (both Italy) made their international debuts.
- Tommaso Menoncello (Italy) had been named to start but withdrew ahead of the game and was replaced by Luca Morisi and Marco Zanon replaced Morisi on the bench.
- Scotland retained the Cuttitta Cup.

18 March 2023
15:45 CET (UTC+1)

(1 BP) France	41–28	Wales (1 BP)
Try: Penaud (2) 9' c, 76'; Danty 33' c Atonio 43' c Fickou 48' c Con: Ramos (5/5) 11', 34', 44', 49', 76'; Pen: Ramos (2/2) 25', 29'	Report	Try: North 7' c Roberts 55' c T. Williams 65' c Dyer 79' c Con: Biggar (3/3) 7', 56', 66'; Halfpenny (1/1) 80'

Stade de France, Saint-Denis
Attendance: 78,635
Referee: Nic Berry (Australia)

FB	15	Thomas Ramos
RW	14	Damian Penaud
OC	13	Gaël Fickou
IC	12	Jonathan Danty
LW	11	Ethan Dumortier	(substituted off) 74'
FH	10	Romain Ntamack
SH	9	Antoine Dupont (c)	(substituted off) 74'
N8	8	Grégory Alldritt
OF	7	Charles Ollivon	(substituted off) 74'
BF	6	François Cros
RL	5	Romain Taofifenua	(substituted off) 59'
LL	4	Thibaud Flament
TP	3	Uini Atonio	(substituted off) 47'
HK	2	Julien Marchand	(substituted off) 49'
LP	1	Cyril Baille	(substituted off) 49'
Replacements:
HK	16	Peato Mauvaka	(substituted on) 49'
PR	17	Reda Wardi	(substituted on) 49'
PR	18	Sipili Falatea	(substituted on) 47'
LK	19	Bastien Chalureau	(substituted on) 59'
FL	20	Sekou Macalou	(substituted on) 74'
SH	21	Maxime Lucu	(substituted on) 74'
CE	22	Yoram Moefana	(substituted on) 74'
FB	23	Melvyn Jaminet
Coach:
(France) Fabien Galthié

FB	15	Louis Rees-Zammit	(substituted off) 74'
RW	14	Josh Adams
OC	13	George North
IC	12	Nick Tompkins
LW	11	Rio Dyer
FH	10	Dan Biggar	(substituted off) 74'
SH	9	Rhys Webb	(substituted off) 54'
N8	8	Taulupe Faletau	(substituted off) 62'
OF	7	Justin Tipuric
BF	6	Aaron Wainwright
RL	5	Alun Wyn Jones	(substituted off) 24'	(substituted on) 37'	(substituted off) 44'
LL	4	Adam Beard
TP	3	Tomas Francis	(substituted off) 57'
HK	2	Ken Owens (c)	(substituted off) 44'
LP	1	Wyn Jones	(substituted off) 44'
Replacements:
HK	16	Bradley Roberts	(substituted on) 44'
PR	17	Gareth Thomas	(substituted on) 44'
PR	18	Dillon Lewis	(substituted on) 57'
LK	19	Dafydd Jenkins	(substituted on) 24'	(substituted off) 37'	(substituted on) 44'
FL	20	Tommy Reffell	(substituted on) 62'
SH	21	Tomos Williams	(substituted on) 54'
FH	22	Owen Williams	(substituted on) 74'
FB	23	Leigh Halfpenny	(substituted on) 74'
Coach:
(New Zealand) Warren Gatland

Player of the Match:
Romain Ntamack (France)

Assistant referees:
Andrew Brace (Ireland)
Christophe Ridley (England)
Television match official:
Joy Neville (Ireland)

Notes:

- Taulupe Faletau (Wales) became the eighth Welshman to earn 100 test caps for Wales.
- Uini Atonio (France) and Dillon Lewis (Wales) earned their 50th test caps.
- France scored their most points against Wales when at home, surpassing the 38 points scored in 2020.
- George North (Wales) surpassed Shane Williams's record of 22 Six Nations tries to become Wales' top try scorer in the Six Nations.
- France surpass their record of 18 tries scored in a Six Nations campaign set in 2006 and 2021 and surpass their own record of 156 points scored in a campaign set in 2002.
- Wales surpass their worst defensive record in a Six Nations campaign, conceding a total of 19 tries. It was previously 18 tries conceded in 2002.

18 March 2023
17:00 WET (UTC+0)

(4 BP) Ireland	29–16	England
Try: Sheehan (2) 32' c, 67' c Henshaw 61' c Herring 76' m Con: Sexton (3/3) 34', 62', 69'; Pen: Sexton (1/1) 18'	Report	Try: George 72' c Con: Farrell (1/1) 72'; Pen: Farrell (3/3) 7', 14', 50'

Aviva Stadium, Dublin
Attendance: 51,700
Referee: Jaco Peyper (South Africa)

FB	15	Hugo Keenan	(substituted off) 40'
RW	14	Mack Hansen
OC	13	Robbie Henshaw
IC	12	Bundee Aki
LW	11	James Lowe
FH	10	Johnny Sexton (c)	(substituted off) 73'
SH	9	Jamison Gibson-Park	(substituted off) 73'
N8	8	Caelan Doris		(substituted off) 78'
OF	7	Josh van der Flier
BF	6	Peter O'Mahony	(substituted off) 55'	(substituted on) 78'
RL	5	James Ryan
LL	4	Ryan Baird	(substituted off) 73'
TP	3	Tadhg Furlong	(substituted off) 58'
HK	2	Dan Sheehan	(substituted off) 69'
LP	1	Andrew Porter	(substituted off) 75'
Replacements:
HK	16	Rob Herring	(substituted on) 69'
PR	17	Cian Healy	(substituted on) 75'
PR	18	Tom O'Toole	(substituted on) 58'
LK	19	Kieran Treadwell	(substituted on) 73'
N8	20	Jack Conan	(substituted on) 55'
SH	21	Conor Murray	(substituted on) 73'
FH	22	Ross Byrne	(substituted on) 73'
FB	23	Jimmy O'Brien	(substituted on) 40'
Coach:
(England) Andy Farrell

FB	15	Freddie Steward	(red card) 40'
RW	14	Anthony Watson
OC	13	Henry Slade
IC	12	Manu Tuilagi
LW	11	Henry Arundell		(substituted off) 58'
FH	10	Owen Farrell (c)
SH	9	Jack van Poortvliet		(substituted off) 69'
N8	8	Alex Dombrandt			(substituted off) 64'
OF	7	Jack Willis	(yellow card) 75'	52' to 64'
BF	6	Lewis Ludlam
RL	5	David Ribbans		(substituted off) 69'
LL	4	Maro Itoje
TP	3	Kyle Sinckler		(substituted off) 67'
HK	2	Jamie George
LP	1	Ellis Genge		(substituted off) 63'
Replacements:
HK	16	Jack Walker
PR	17	Mako Vunipola		(substituted on) 63'
PR	18	Dan Cole		(substituted on) 67'
LK	19	Nick Isiekwe		(substituted on) 69'
FL	20	Ben Curry		(substituted on) 52'
SH	21	Alex Mitchell		(substituted on) 69'
FH	22	Marcus Smith
CE	23	Joe Marchant		(substituted on) 58'
Coach:
(England) Steve Borthwick

Player of the Match:
Dan Sheehan (Ireland)

Assistant referees:
Ben O'Keeffe (New Zealand)
Pierre Brousset (France)
Television match official:
Marius Jonker (South Africa)

Notes:

- Dan Cole (England) became the fourth player to earn 100 test caps for England.
- Freddie Steward was contentiously sent off during the game following a collision with Hugo Keenan. The red card was later rescinded by a World Rugby citing committee as they ruled that referee Jaco Peyper and his team were wrong to have sent Steward off.
- Josh van der Flier (Ireland) earned his 50th test cap.
- Ireland won the Championship for the 15th time and a fourth Grand Slam, their first won at home since 1948 and a first home Championship win since 1985.
- Ireland became the first team to win the Triple Crown in back-to-back consecutive years since they last did it in 2006 and 2007.
- Ireland became the first nation to see their senior men's side and under-20s' side win the Grand Slam in the same year.
- Johnny Sexton (Ireland) surpassed Ronan O'Gara's record of 557 points scored in the Six Nations to become the competition's all-time leading point scorer.
- Ireland retained the Millennium Trophy.

== Netflix documentary ==
The Netflix documentary focuses on the behind-the-scenes look at the teams playing in the tournament. The documentary premiered in January 2024.

== Player statistics ==
=== Most points ===
Rank	Name	Team	Points
1	Thomas Ramos	France	84
2	Johnny Sexton	Ireland	35
3	Tommaso Allan	Italy	34
4	Finn Russell	Scotland	32
5	Owen Farrell	England	28
6	Blair Kinghorn	Scotland	26
7	Damian Penaud	France	25
8	Huw Jones	Scotland	20
9	Ross Byrne	Ireland	16
10	Thibaud Flament	France	15
10	Mack Hansen	Ireland	15
10	James Lowe	Ireland	15
10	Duhan van der Merwe	Scotland	15

=== Most tries ===
Rank	Name	Team	Tries
1	Damian Penaud	France	5
2	Huw Jones	Scotland	4
2	Blair Kinghorn	Scotland	4
4	Thibaud Flament	France	3
4	Mack Hansen	Ireland	3
4	James Lowe	Ireland	3
4	Thomas Ramos	France	3
4	Duhan van der Merwe	Scotland	3
9	Ethan Dumortier	France	2
9	Rio Dyer	Wales	2
9	Gaël Fickou	France	2
9	Jamie George	England	2
9	Hugo Keenan	Ireland	2
9	Max Malins	England	2
9	Charles Ollivon	France	2
9	James Ryan	Ireland	2
9	Dan Sheehan	Ireland	2
9	Kyle Steyn	Scotland	2
9	Liam Williams	Wales	2

== Broadcasting ==
In the United Kingdom, each game was broadcast live on a free-to-air terrestrial TV channel, either the BBC or ITV, as a result of a new deal covering the four years from 2022 to 2025. All of Wales' games were also broadcast on S4C in the Welsh language

In the Republic of Ireland, all games were shown free-to-air on either RTÉ or Virgin Media under the terms of the new TV rights share.
