= Jack Walker (rugby union) =

English rugby union player

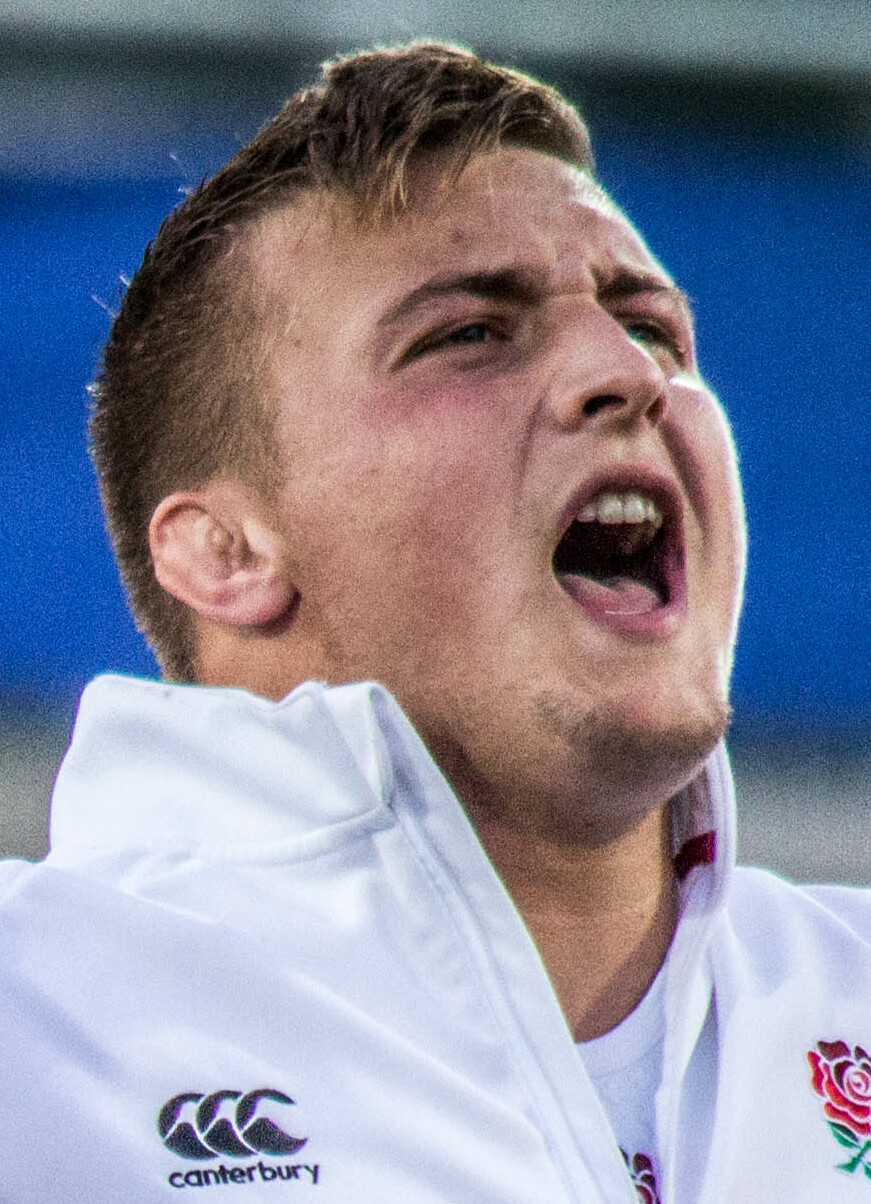
- Walker in 2015
- Full name: Jack Robert Walker
- Born: 6 May 1996 (age 30) Steeton, England
- Height: 1.85 m (6 ft 1 in)
- Weight: 109 kg (240 lb; 17 st 2 lb)
- School: Settle College, Prince Henry's Grammar School

Rugby union career
- Position: Hooker
- Current team: Harlequins
Senior career
Years	Team	Apps	(Points)
2013–2016	Yorkshire Carnegie	33	(5)
2016–2021	Bath	88	(50)
2016	→ London Scottish (loan)	1	(0)
2021–	Harlequins	44	(15)
- Correct as of 28 August 2023
International career
Years	Team	Apps	(Points)
2014–2016	England U20	21	(10)
2023–	England	4	(0)
- Correct as of 28 August 2023

Jack Robert Walker (born 6 May 1996) is an English professional rugby union player who plays as a hooker for Premiership Rugby club Harlequins and the England national team.

== Early life ==
Walker was born in Steeton, West Yorkshire, his father played both Rugby Union and Rugby league. Walker attended Settle College and Prince Henry's Grammar School, he started playing at North Ribblesdale. Walker began playing at fly-half before being moved to the forwards. Walker was awarded the Jaguar Academy of Sport rising star in 2012.

== Club career ==
Walker signed for Yorkshire Carnegie in 2013. He made his debut in October 2013 coming off the bench in a match against Bristol Bears at the age of 17 years and 160 days becoming the youngest forward to appear for Carnegie. Walker became the youngest captain of Carnegie in 2015 at the age of 18 years, 256 days.

In May 2016 it was announced that Walker had signed with Bath for the 2016/17 season. He came off the bench for the Bath side that lost to Exeter Chiefs in the final of the 2017–18 Anglo-Welsh Cup. In the summer of 2021 Walker joined Harlequins.

== International career ==
Walker has represented the England age groups from U16-U20. He was a member of the team that won the 2014 IRB Junior World Championship and came off the bench in the final against South Africa at Eden Park. The following year saw Walker start all of the matches for England as they won the 2015 Six Nations Under 20s Championship and finished runners up to New Zealand in the 2015 World Rugby Under 20 Championship.

Walker was made captain of the side for the 2016 Six Nations Under 20s Championship and the subsequent 2016 World Rugby Under 20 Championship. He scored a try during the pool stage against Scotland but was unable to participate in the knockout phase of the tournament due to concussion. England won the final of the competition and Walker lifted the trophy alongside Harry Mallinder who had captained in his absence.

In June 2022 Walker received his first call-up to the senior England squad by coach Eddie Jones. Walker was included in the squad for the 2023 Six Nations Championship by new coach Steve Borthwick. An unused substitute in the opening round defeat to Scotland, he made his debut in the next round on 12 February 2023 coming on as a second-half replacement for Jamie George in a victory against Italy at Twickenham.

== Honours ==
England U20

- 2× World Rugby Under 20 Championship: 2014, 2016
- 1× Six Nations Under 20s Championship: 2015

Bath

- 1× Anglo-Welsh Cup runner-up: 2018

Individual

- 1× Jaguar Academy of Sport Rising Star: 2012
