= Jack Willis (rugby union) =

England international rugby union player

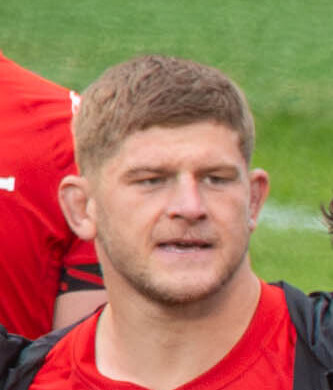
- Willis in 2025
- Full name: Jack Steven Arthur Willis
- Born: 24 December 1996 (age 29) Reading, England
- Height: 1.91 m (6 ft 3 in)
- Weight: 110 kg (243 lb; 17 st 5 lb)
- School: The Henley College
- Notable relative: Tom Willis (brother)

Rugby union career
- Position: Flanker
- Current team: Toulouse
Senior career
Years	Team	Apps	(Points)
2016–2022	Wasps	83	(105)
2022–	Toulouse	58	(75)
- Correct as of 14 April 2025
International career
Years	Team	Apps	(Points)
2016	England U20	7	(0)
2020–	England	14	(20)
- Correct as of 23 September 2023

Jack Steven Arthur Willis (born 24 December 1996) is an English professional rugby union player who plays as a flanker for Top 14 club Toulouse and the England national team.

== Club career ==
=== Wasps: 2015–2022 ===
Willis played junior rugby for Reading Abbey R.F.C. before joining the Wasps Senior Academy in 2015. In November 2016 he made his first senior start for Wasps in an Anglo-Welsh Cup game against Sale Sharks. Later that month he made his Premiership debut against the same opponent.

After an exceptional 2019–2020 season which saw Wasps finish runners up to Exeter Chiefs in the Premiership final, Willis was the recipient of multiple awards, including: The "players' player of the year" award, the Premiership "Player of the Season" award, and the "Discovery of the Season" award.

Wasps entered administration on 17 October 2022 and Willis was made redundant along with all other players and coaching staff.

=== Toulouse: 2022– ===
On 24 November 2022, he joined France's most-successful club Toulouse in the Top 14 competition with immediate effect.

On 8 December 2024, he won man of the match in the opening round of the 2024–25 Champions Cup helping his side to defeat Ulster 61‍–‍21. In April 2025, he won man of the match again, scoring a try in the Champions Cup Round of 16 during a 38‍–‍15 victory against Sale Sharks. The following week he scored a try in the quarter finals of the competition, in a 21‍–‍18 win away against Toulon at the Stade Mayol. In April 2025, he was nominated for Champions Cup Player of the Year 2025. In June 2025, he won the Top14 title again with Toulouse, scoring two tries in the final as they defeated Bordeaux Bègles 39–33 in extra time.

== International career ==
Willis was a member of the England under-20 team that hosted the 2016 World Rugby Under 20 Championship and came off the bench as England defeated Ireland in the final. In 2018 he was named in the England senior squad for their tour to South Africa. A knee injury sustained in the Premiership semi-final defeat against Saracens ruled him out of the tour.

In October 2020 Willis was again called up by coach Eddie Jones to train with the senior squad as they completed their Six Nations campaign. The following month he made his Test debut starting in their opening Autumn Nations Cup fixture against Georgia at Twickenham on 14 November 2020 which saw him open the scoring with a debut try in the 15th minute as England won 40-0.

Willis scored a try against Italy during the 2023 Six Nations Championship. Later that year coach Steve Borthwick included him in the squad for the 2023 Rugby World Cup. He scored a try on his only appearance of the tournament in a pool stage game against Chile. However a neck injury sustained by Willis in that match ruled him out of the rest of the competition.

== Career statistics ==
=== List of international tries ===
As of 23 September 2023

Try	Opposing team	Location	Venue	Competition	Date	Result	Score
1	Georgia	London, England	Twickenham Stadium	Autumn Nations Cup	14 November 2020	Win	40–0
2	Italy	London, England	Twickenham Stadium	2021 Six Nations	13 February 2021	Win	41–18
3	Italy	London, England	Twickenham Stadium	2023 Six Nations	12 February 2023	Win	31–14
4	Chile	Lille, France	Stade Pierre-Mauroy	2023 Rugby World Cup	23 September 2023	Win	71–0

== Honours ==
Toulouse

- Top 14: 2022–23, 2023–24, 2024–25, 2025–26
- European Rugby Champions Cup: 2023–24
