= Rio Dyer =

Welsh rugby union player (born 1999)

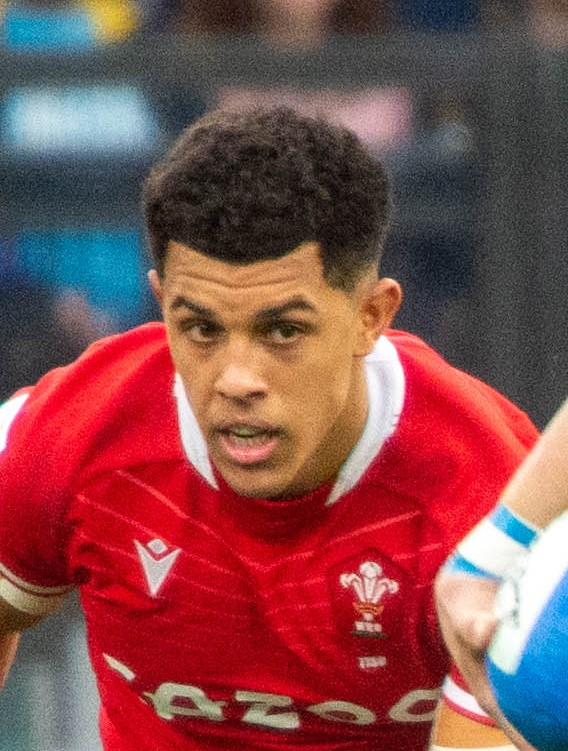
- Dyer representing Wales during the Six Nations Championship
- Born: 21 December 1999 (age 26) Newport, Wales
- Height: 1.86 m (6 ft 1 in)
- Weight: 84 kg (185 lb; 13 st 3 lb)
- School: Newport High School; Bassaleg School

Rugby union career
- Position: Wing
- Current team: Dragons
Senior career
Years	Team	Apps	(Points)
2017–	Dragons	97	(140)
International career
Years	Team	Apps	(Points)
2018–2019	Wales U20	7	(10)
2019	Wales 7s	24	(35)
2022–	Wales	24	(35)

Rio Dyer (born 21 December 1999) is a Welsh professional rugby union player who plays as a wing for United Rugby Championship club Dragons and the Wales national team.

== Club career ==
Dyer began his career playing for the Risca RFC and Pill Harriers RFC youth sides, as well as for Newport High School Old Boys RFC.

While part of the Dragons Academy, Dyer made his professional debut on 27 January 2018, against Saracens in the Anglo-Welsh Cup. His first appearance in the Pro14 came against Benetton Rugby the following month.

Dyer was named man of the match on 4 January 2020, as the Dragons beat regional rivals Ospreys 25–18, with Dyer scoring a try in the victory. In March 2020, Dyer signed his first professional contract with the Dragons. He signed an extension in January 2022.

On 23 October 2022, Dyer again claimed a man of the match award against the Ospreys, scoring twice and propelling the Dragons to a 32–25 win.

On 17 January 2024, Dyer signed a long–term contract extension with the Dragons.

== International career ==
Dyer was a Wales U20 international. He missed the 2019 Six Nations Under 20s Championship to participate in the World Rugby Sevens Series, but rejoined the U20 side for the 2019 World Rugby Under 20 Championship.

On 18 October 2022, Dyer was named in the Wales squad for the 2022 Autumn series. Dyer started against New Zealand on 5 November 2022, and scored the first try for Wales.

Dyer scored his second try for Wales in the final match of the series, a loss against Australia.

Owing to his continued good form, Dyer continued his involvement with the national side, and was named in the Welsh squad for the 2023 Six Nations Championship. Dyer started the first two matches against Ireland and Scotland, but was dropped for the match against England, following Louis Rees-Zammit returning to fitness.

Recalled to the starting team against Italy, he scored his third try for Wales, and secured his first win for the national side. The following week Dyer scored again, against France, securing a try bonus point for Wales as they avoided a wooden spoon finish.

Dyer was named in the Wales squad for the 2023 Rugby World Cup, and appeared in all matches as Wales made the quarter final round.

Dyer was named in the squad for the 2024 Six Nations. He started all matches, scoring tries against Scotland and France.

Dyer was selected for the 2025 end-of-year rugby union internationals. He started against South Africa.

== Career statistics ==
=== List of international tries ===
No.	Date	Venue	Opponent	Score	Result	Competition
1	5 November 2022	Millennium Stadium, Cardiff, Wales	New Zealand	5–17	23–55	2022 end-of-year rugby union internationals
2	26 November 2022	Millennium Stadium, Cardiff, Wales	Australia	32–13	34–39	2022 end-of-year rugby union internationals
3	11 March 2023	Stadio Olimpico, Rome, Italy	Italy	8–0	29–17	2023 Six Nations Championship
4	18 March 2023	Stade de France, Saint-Denis, France	France	26–41	28–41	2023 Six Nations Championship
5	3 February 2024	Millennium Stadium, Cardiff, Wales	Scotland	10–27	26–27	2024 Six Nations Championship
6	10 March 2024	Millennium Stadium, Cardiff, Wales	France	8–0	24–45	2024 Six Nations Championship

as of 10 March 2024
