= Edoardo Iachizzi =

Italy international rugby union player

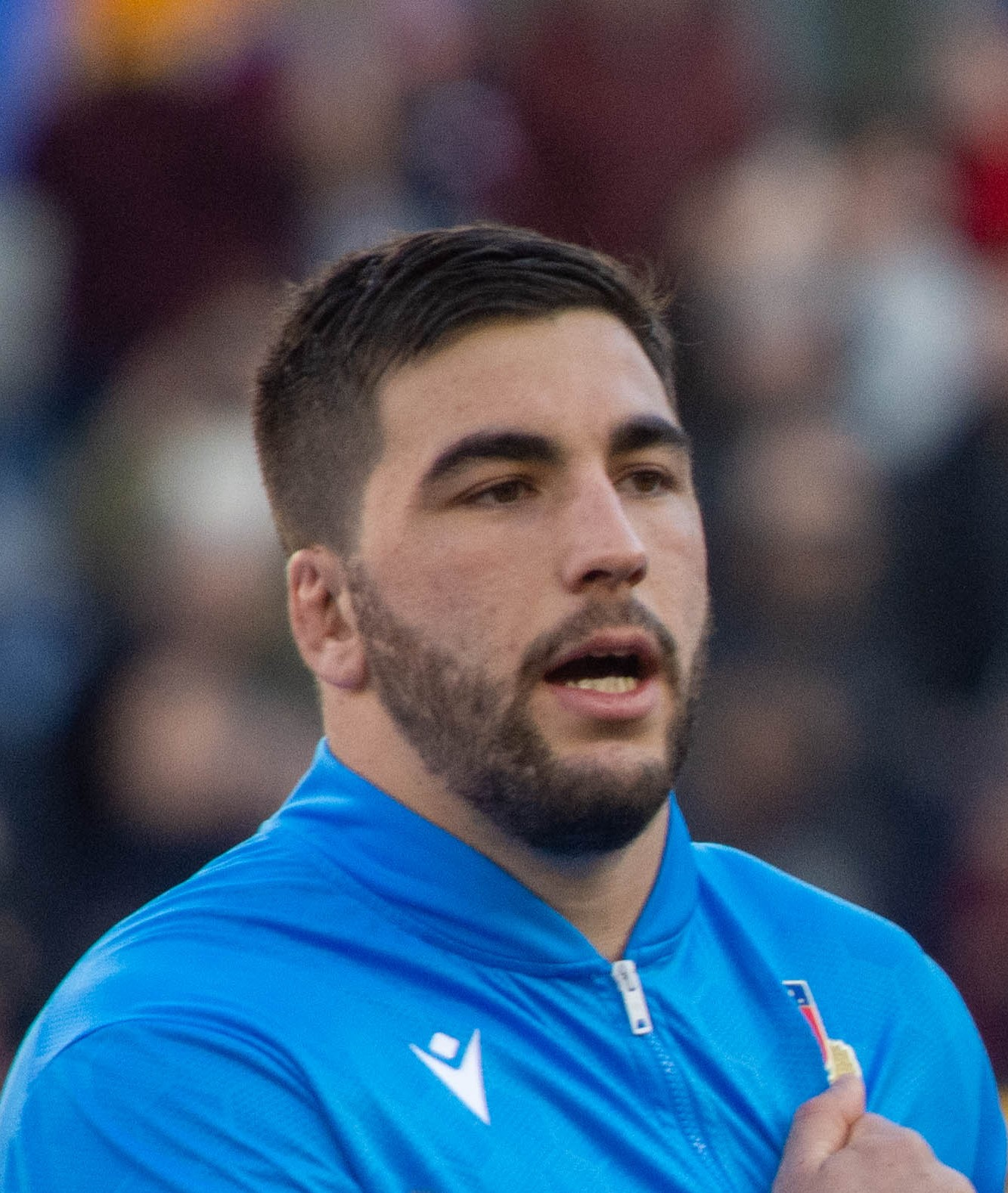
- Iachizzi in 2023
- Born: 26 May 1998 (age 28) Rome, Italy
- Height: 1.96 m (6 ft 5 in)
- Weight: 110 kg (17 st 5 lb; 243 lb)

Rugby union career
- Position: Flanker
- Current team: Vannes
Youth career
- 2015−2016: Lazio
- 2016−2018: Perpignan
Senior career
Years	Team	Apps	(Points)
2018−2020	Perpignan	6	(0)
2020−2023	Vannes	52	(20)
2023−2025	Benetton	17	(5)
2025−	Vannes	0	(0)
- Correct as of 17 Sep 2026
International career
Years	Team	Apps	(Points)
2017−2018	Italy Under 20	15	(10)
2022	Italy A	1	(0)
2023 -	Italy	8	(0)
- Correct as of 17 Sep 2026

Edoardo Iachizzi (born 26 May 1998) is a professional Italian rugby union player. His usual positions are flanker or lock and currently plays for French club Vannes in Pro D2.

From 2018 to 2020, he played for Perpignan in espoirs team. Iacchizzi signed for Benetton Rugby in March 2023 ahead of the 2023–24 United Rugby Championship. He made his debut in Round 1 of the 2023–24 season against the Cardiff. He played with Benetton in the United Rugby Championship until 2025.

From 2017 to 2018, Iachizzi was named in the Italy Under 20 squad. On 26 May he was called in Italy A squad for the South African tour in the 2022 mid-year rugby union tests against Namibia and Currie Cup XV team. On 28 January 2023, he was selected by Kieran Crowley to be part of an Italy 33-man squad for the 2023 Six Nations Championship. He made his debut against France.
