= Andrew Porter (rugby union) =

Irish and British & Irish Lions international rugby union player

Andrew Gerald Porter
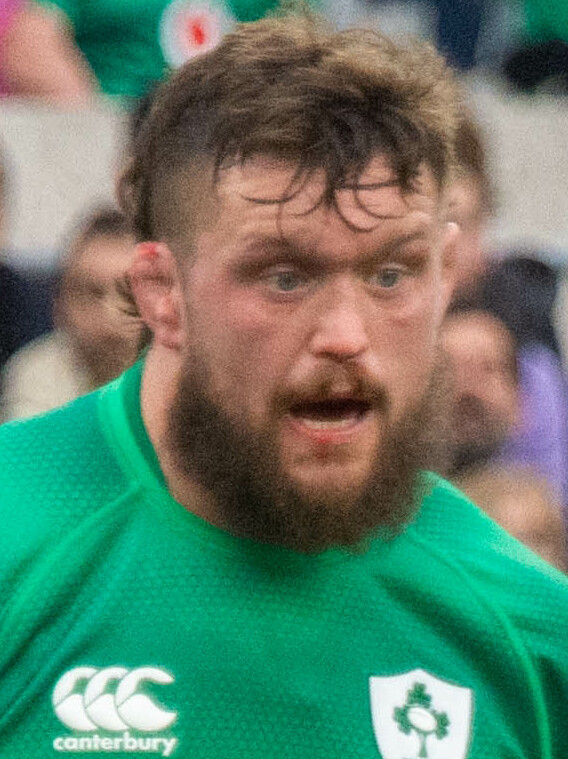
- Porter representing Ireland during the Six Nations Championship
- Full name: Andrew Gerald Porter
- Born: 16 January 1996 (age 30) Dublin, Ireland
- Height: 1.83 m (6 ft 0 in)
- Weight: 123 kg (271 lb; 19 st 5 lb)
- School: St. Andrew's College
- University: University College Dublin

Rugby union career
- Position: Prop
- Current team: Leinster
Senior career
Years	Team	Apps	(Points)
2016–	Leinster	154	(90)
- Correct as of 14 November 2026
International career
Years	Team	Apps	(Points)
2015–2016	Ireland U20	17	(10)
2017–	Ireland	82	(40)
2021, 2025	British & Irish Lions	3	(0)
- Correct as of 21 November 2026

Andrew Gerald Porter (born 16 January 1996) is an Irish professional rugby union player who plays as a prop for United Rugby Championship club Leinster and the Ireland national team. He was selected for the British and Irish Lions tour of South Africa in 2021 as well as the tour of Australia in 2025.

== Early life ==
Porter’s mother died from cancer when he was a child. Porter was educated and played rugby at St. Andrew's College, Dublin from 2008–2014. He then attended and played rugby for University College Dublin.

Porter was noted for his strength and power. He could squat 350 kg (772 lb), making him already one of the strongest rugby players in the world, when he was aged just 20 and in his first year under professional contract.

== Club career ==
Porter entered the Leinster academy in Summer 2016 and made his senior first team debut off the bench against Benetton Treviso in the first game of the season on 2 September. He was noted for his surprising speed and mobility in the loose, as evidenced by him making a break and scoring a try from inside his own half in the 2015–16 season for UCD in the AIL League.

Porter returned from a season long injury in May 2025 to face Toulon in the Champions Cup semi-final.

== International career ==
At under-20 level, Porter starred for the Ireland U20 team for two seasons, including being involved in their best ever result in the Junior World Championship in 2016, when they finished runners-up. He made twelve appearances and scored two tries over the two seasons of his involvement with the squad.

Porter first represented Ireland at senior level in 2017.

On 6 May 2021, Porter was named in the squad for the 2021 British & Irish Lions tour to South Africa.

== Career statistics ==
=== List of international tries ===
Number	Position	Points	Tries	Result	Opposition	Venue	Date	Ref.
1	Prop	5	1	Lost	England	Twickenham Stadium	23 February 2020	
2	Prop	5	1	Won	Argentina	Aviva Stadium	21 November 2021	
3–4	Prop	10	2	Won	New Zealand	Forsyth Barr Stadium	9 July 2022	
5	Prop	5	1	Won	France	Aviva Stadium	11 February 2023	
6	Prop	5	1	Won	Scotland	Aviva Stadium	16 March 2024	
7	Prop	5	1	Won	Japan	Aviva Stadium	8 November 2025	

as of 25 November 2025

== Honours ==
Ireland

- 3× Six Nations Championship: 2018, 2023, 2024
- 2× Grand Slam: 2018, 2023
- 3× Triple Crown: 2018, 2022, 2023

Leinster

- 1× European Rugby Champions Cup: 2018
- 5× Pro12: 2018, 2019, 2020, 2021, 2025
