= Tommy Reffell =

Welsh rugby union player

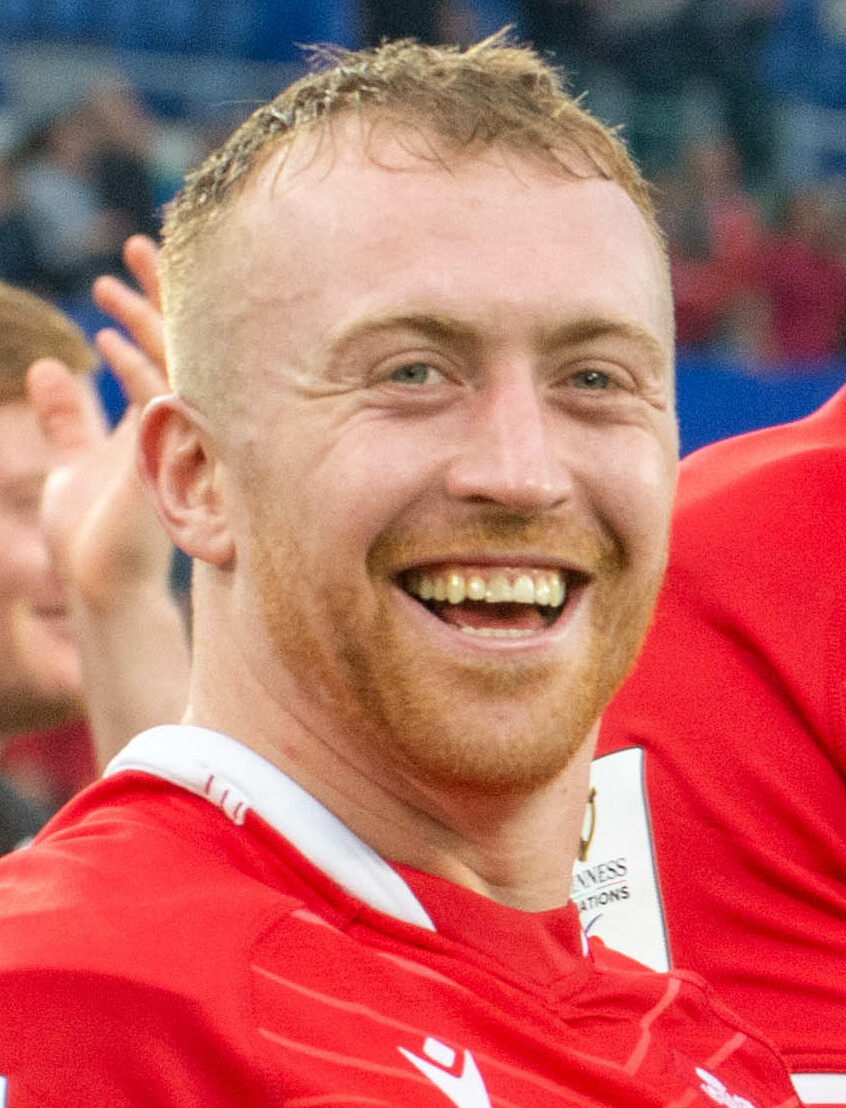
- Reffell representing Wales during the Six Nations Championship
- Full name: Tomas John Reffell
- Born: 27 April 1999 (age 27) Tonyrefail, Wales
- Height: 1.83 m (6 ft 0 in)
- Weight: 103 kg (227 lb; 16 st 3 lb)
- School: Wyggeston and Queen Elizabeth I College

Rugby union career
- Position: Flanker
- Current team: Leicester Tigers
Senior career
Years	Team	Apps	(Points)
2017–	Leicester Tigers	160	(130)
2017–2018	Loughborough Students	5	(5)
- Correct as of 13 October 2026
International career
Years	Team	Apps	(Points)
2018–2019	Wales U20	15	(10)
2022–	Wales	27	(5)
- Correct as of 15 March 2025

Tomas John Reffell (born 27 April 1999) is a Welsh professional rugby union player who plays as a flanker for Premiership Rugby club Leicester Tigers and the Wales national team.

== Club career ==
Reffell began his junior career at his local club Pencoed RFC aged 4. He was part of the Ospreys under 16s and joined Leicester aged 15.

Reffell made his debut for Leicester Tigers on 10 November 2017 in a 33–31 defeat against Bath at the Rec in the Anglo-Welsh Cup.

In March 2020, Reffell won the Premiership Rugby Cup Breakthrough Player award for his performances in that year's competition.

His form for Leicester in the 2020–21 season lead to speculation that he was in contention to be capped by either England or Wales, but he remained uncapped. He was named man of the match by the Leicester Mercury following his performance in Tigers' win against Gloucester on 24 September 2021.

His form continued into the next season, earning plaudits as he scored twice in the win against Harlequins on 16 October 2022. On 27 November 2022 he was again named player of the match, scoring Leicester's fourth try in the win over London Irish.

In June, Reffell started the 2022 Premiership Rugby final as Leicester won 15-12 against Saracens.

Reffell scored the winning try as Leicester beat Exeter Chiefs on the opening day of the 2024-25 Premiership Rugby season.

== International career ==
Reffell captained both Wales U18 and Wales U20.

After another spell of good form, in May 2022, Reffell was named in the Wales squad for their summer tour to South Africa. On 2 July 2022 Reffell made his debut for Wales in their 32–29 defeat to South Africa at Loftus Versfeld in Pretoria. The following match on 9 July 2022 saw him win the man of the match award, as Wales beat South Africa 13-12 for their first ever win against South Africa in South Africa.

Reffell kept his position into the 2022 Autumn Internationals, starting against New Zealand. Reffell was injured during the match, and played no further part in Wales's autumn campaign.

== Career statistics ==
=== List of international tries ===
No.	Date	Venue	Opponent	Score	Result	Competition
1	16 July 2022	Cape Town Stadium, Cape Town, South Africa	South Africa	5–10	14–30	2022 mid-year rugby union tests

as of 16 July 2022
