= Hugo Keenan =

Irish rugby union player (born 1996)

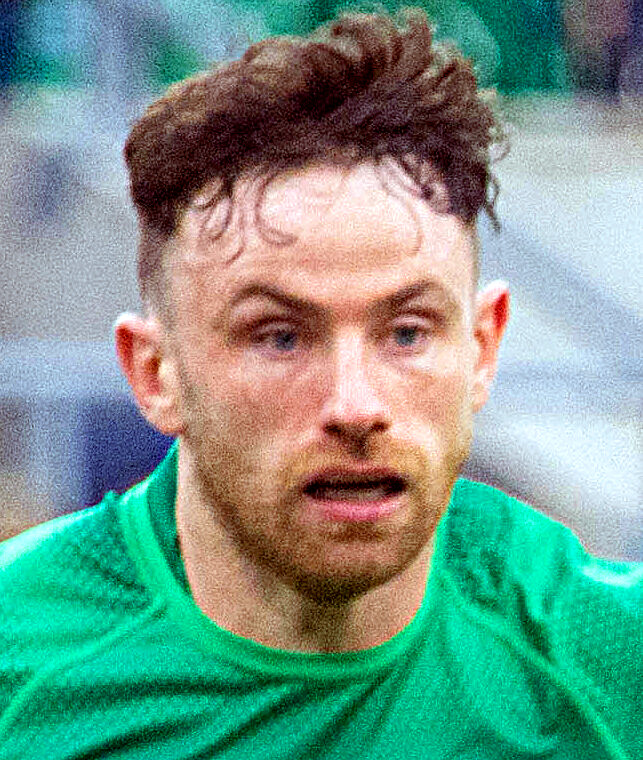
- Keenan in the Six Nations Championship
- Born: 18 June 1996 (age 30) Dublin, Ireland
- Height: 1.85 m (6 ft 1 in)
- Weight: 92 kg (203 lb)
- School: Blackrock College

Rugby union career
- Position(s): Fullback, Wing
- Current team: Leinster
Senior career
Years	Team	Apps	(Points)
2016–	Leinster	77	(85)
- Correct as of 6 November 2026
International career
Years	Team	Apps	(Points)
2016	Ireland U20	10	(5)
2020–	Ireland	50	(90)
2025	British & Irish Lions	3	(5)
- Correct as of 21 November 2026
National sevens team
Years	Team		Comps
2017–2024	Ireland		17
- Correct as of 19 December 2020

Hugo Keenan (born 18 June 1996) is an Irish professional rugby union player who plays as a fullback for United Rugby Championship club Leinster and the Ireland national team.

== Early life ==
Keenan attended secondary school at Blackrock College. There he was a member of the team that won the 2014 Leinster Schools Senior Cup, with Keenan noted for his running and passing, including scoring a try in the final.

== Professional career ==
=== Leinster ===
Keenan debuted for Leinster in 2016 against Zebre at the age of 20. In May 2026, Leinster announced that Keenan had signed a new contract and would remain at the province until 2028.

=== Ireland U20 and 7s ===
Keenan played wing for the Ireland under-20 national rugby union team. Keenan started all matches for the Ireland under-20 team during the 2016 under-20 Six Nations. He also started all matches in the 2016 World Rugby under-20 Championship, including Ireland's historic victory over New Zealand.

Keenan was called into the Ireland national rugby sevens team camp in early 2017. Keenan was part of the Ireland sevens team during the 2017 Grand Prix Series. He scored several tries during Ireland's win at the 2017 Moscow Sevens, including a crucial try in Ireland's 28–21 semifinal win over Russia.

Keenan was called up to the Sevens Team for the 2023/24 Madrid Grand Final. In June 2024 Keenan was called up to the 2024 Olympics Squad.

=== Ireland ===
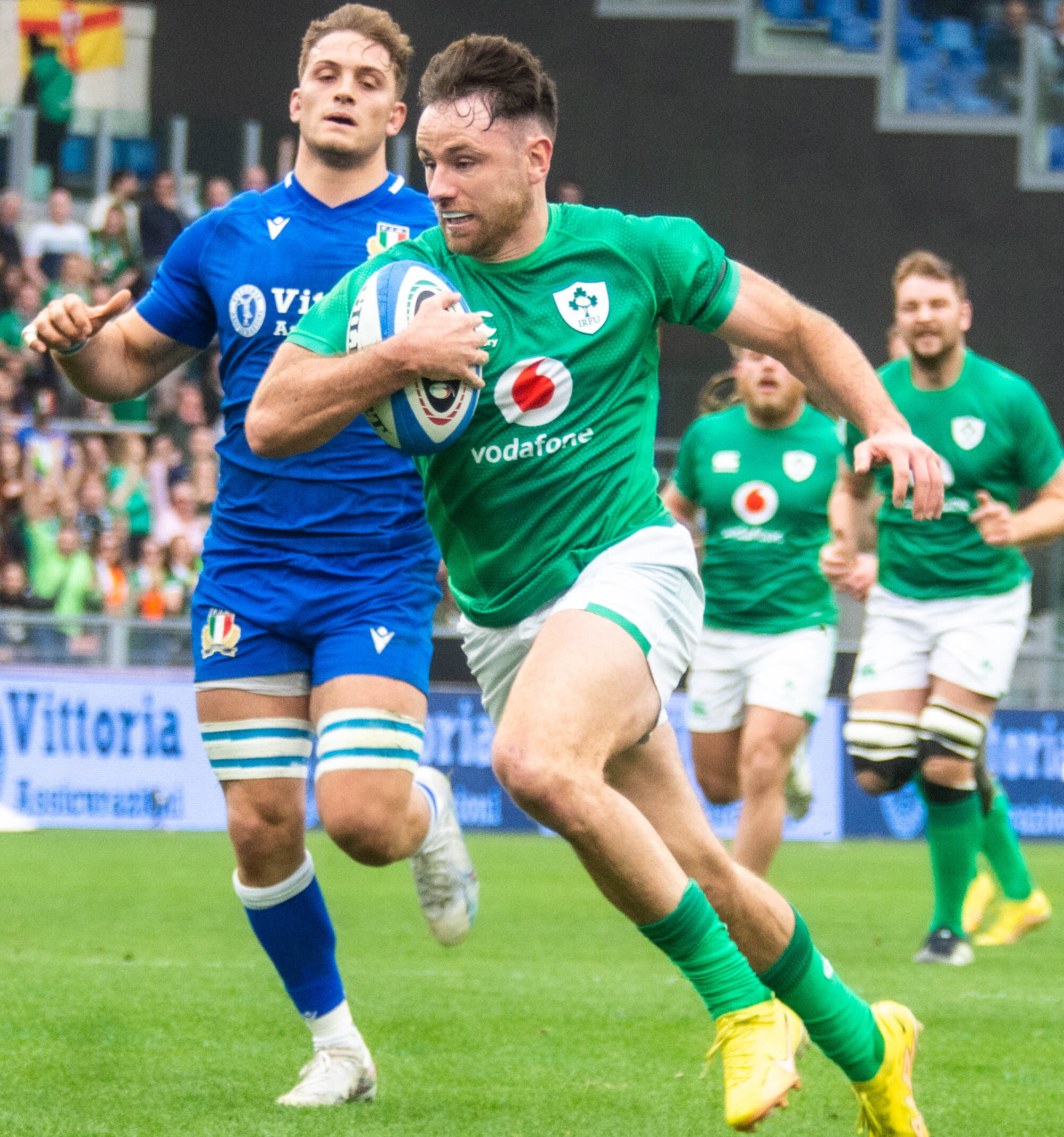
Keenan makes a break during Ireland's 2023 Six Nations match with Italy

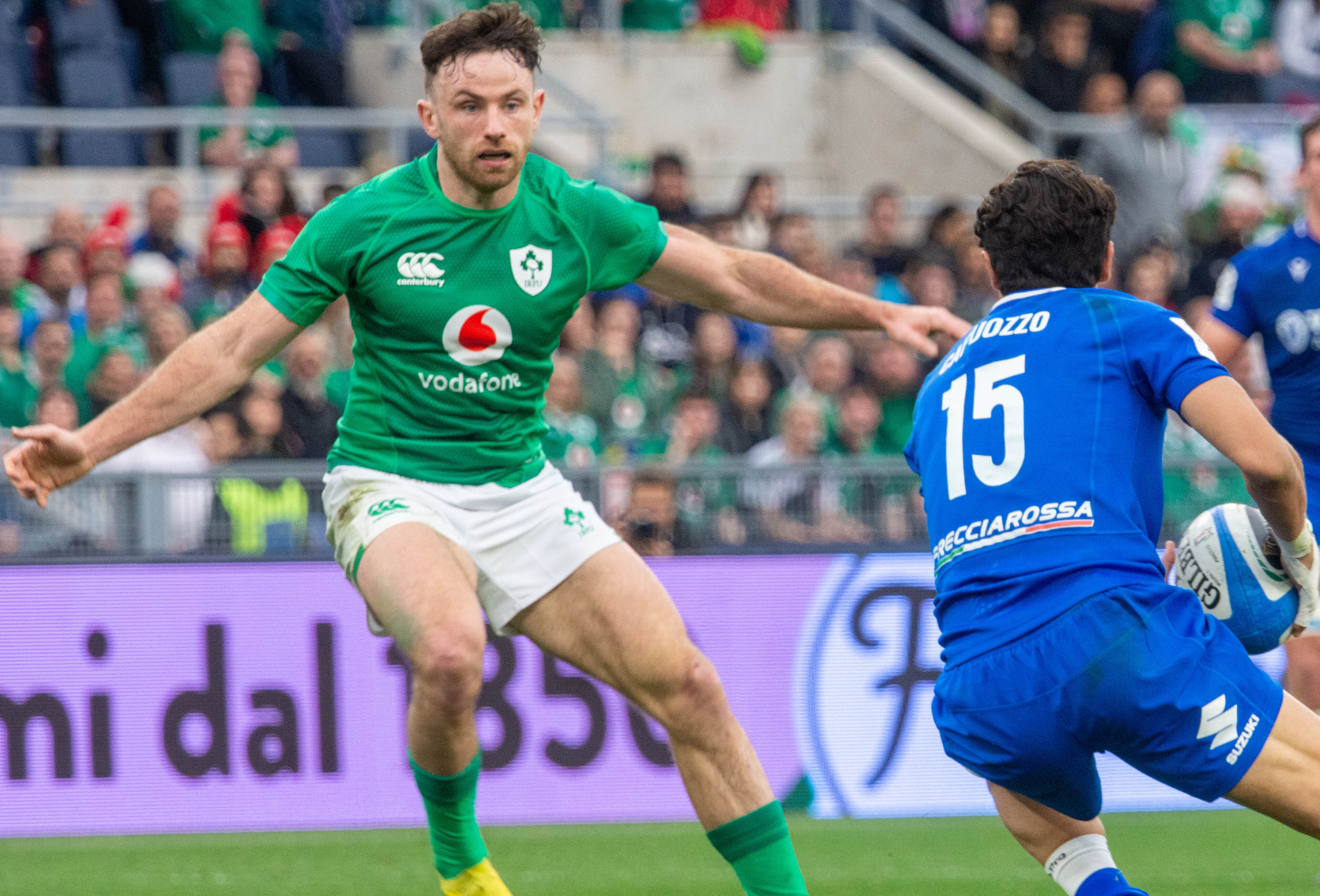
Keenan during Ireland's 2023 Six Nations match with Italy

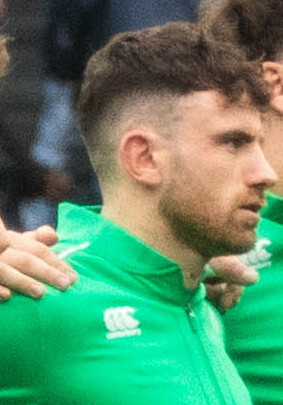
Keenan standing for the anthem during the 2023 Six Nations

Keenan debuted for Ireland on 24 October 2020 in a Six Nations match against Italy, where he started on the wing and scored two tries in a 50–17 win. Keenan then started Ireland's next 17 internationals between 2020 and 2022, scoring tries against Georgia, Italy, USA, England and New Zealand. Keenan was recognized for his strong performance in Ireland’s win against England in the 2022 Six Nations. Keenan was described in March 2022 as the heir to Rob Kearney at fullback for Ireland.

Selected for the 2023 Rugby World Cup by Ireland Coach Andy Farrell, Keenan started in all five matches for the Ireland within the tournament.

=== British & Irish Lions ===
Keenan was named in the initial Lions squad for the 2025 tour to Australia as part of the event held at the O2 Arena in London. Despite suffering from illness and injury during the beginning of the tour to Australia, Keenan made his Lions debut as cap #881 against the Queensland Reds on 5 July 2025. Keenan started both of the first two test matches against the Wallabies and scored the series clinching try in 79th minute of the second test.

== Playing style ==
Known for his defence, aerial skills and ability to pick up loose kicks and engineer attacking plays for his team, Keenan's fitness has led to a world record 4:11 in the bronco test.

== Career statistics ==
=== List of international tries ===
Number	Position	Points	Tries	Result	Opposition	Venue	Date	Ref.
1–2	Wing	10	2	Won	Italy	Aviva Stadium	24 October 2020	
3	Wing	5	1	Won	Georgia	Aviva Stadium	29 November 2020	
4	Fullback	5	1	Won	Italy	Stadio Olimpico	27 February 2021	
5	Fullback	5	1	Won	United States	Aviva Stadium	10 July 2021	
6	Fullback	5	1	Won	England	Twickenham Stadium	12 March 2022	
7	Fullback	5	1	Won	New Zealand	Sky Stadium	16 July 2022	
8	Fullback	5	1	Won	France	Aviva Stadium	11 February 2023	
9	Fullback	5	1	Won	Italy	Stadio Olimpico	25 February 2023	
10	Fullback	5	1	Won	Romania	Nouveau Stade de Bordeaux	9 September 2023	
11-12	Fullback	10	2	Won	Scotland	Stade de France	7 October 2023	
13	Fullback	5	1	Won	Italy	Stadio Olimpico	15 March 2025	
14	Fullback	5	1	Won	Australia	Melbourne Cricket Ground	26 July 2025	

as of 26 July 2025

== Honours ==
Leinster

- 5× United Rugby Championship: 2018, 2019, 2020, 2021, 2025

Ireland

- 2× Six Nations Championship: 2023, 2024
- 1× Grand Slam: 2023
- 3× Triple Crown: 2022, 2023, 2025

British & Irish Lions

- 1x Test Series: 2025

Individual

- 2x Six Nations Team of the Championship: 2022, 2023
