= Dillon Lewis =

Welsh rugby union player (born 1996)

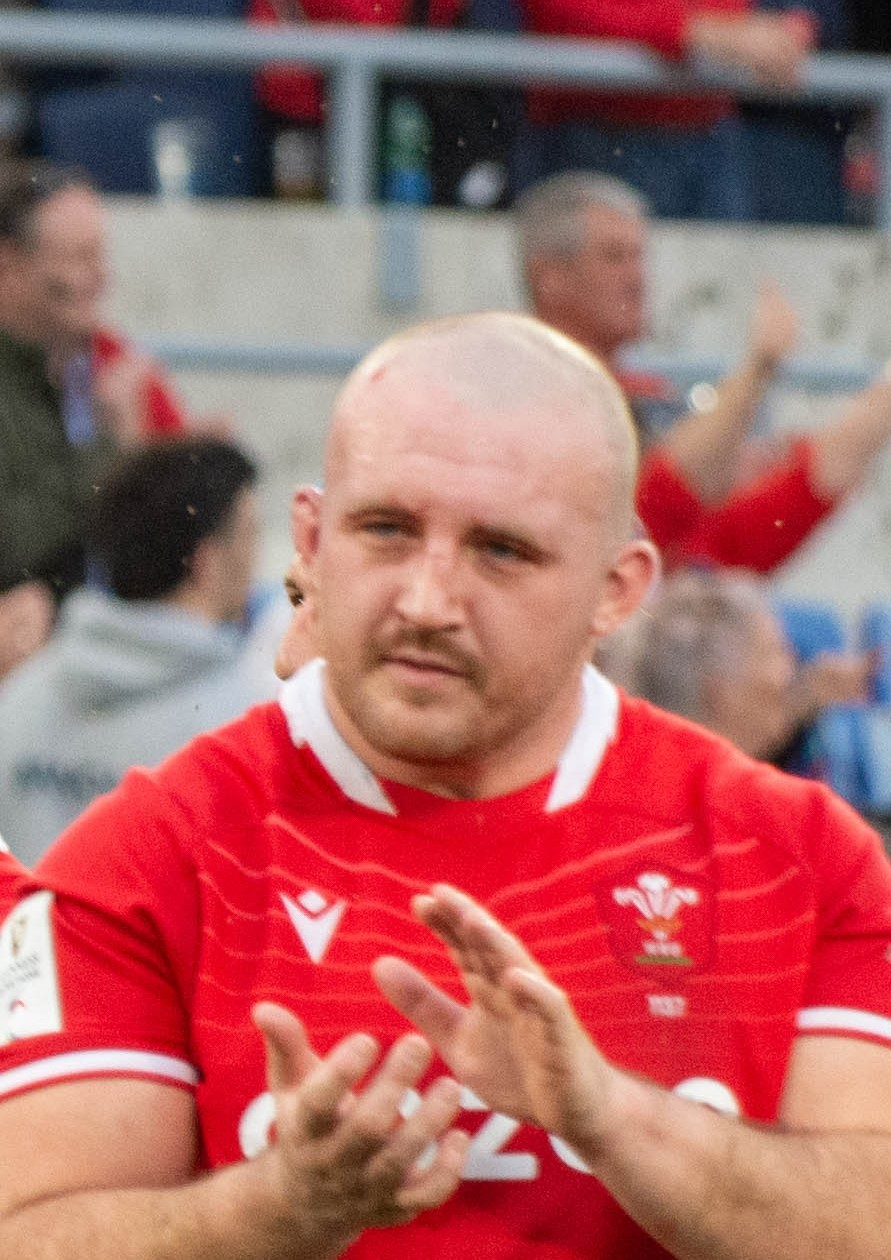
- Lewis representing Wales during the Six Nations Championship
- Full name: Dillon Anthony Lewis
- Born: 4 January 1996 (age 30) Church Village, Wales
- Height: 1.85 m (6 ft 1 in)
- Weight: 125 kg (276 lb; 19 st 10 lb)
- School: Ysgol Garth Olwg

Rugby union career
- Position: Prop
- Current team: Dragons
Senior career
Years	Team	Apps	(Points)
2015–2023	Cardiff	94	(10)
2023–2025	Harlequins	29	(5)
2025–	Dragons	3	(0)
- Correct as of 18 November 2026
International career
Years	Team	Apps	(Points)
2015–2016	Wales U20	20	(5)
2017–	Wales	57	(5)
- Correct as of 18 November 2026

Dillon Anthony Lewis (born 4 January 1996) is a Welsh professional rugby union player who plays as a prop for the Dragons in the United Rugby Championship and the Wales national team.

== Club career ==
Lewis made his debut for the Cardiff in 2014 having been developed through their academy system. He has also played on permit for Pontypridd RFC.

Ahead of the 2023/24 season, Lewis left Cardiff to join Harlequins alongside Wales and Cardiff teammate Jarrod Evans. The pair were now being coached by former Wales international Adam Jones, another former Cardiff player, as he was the club's scrum and transition coach. Lewis made his debut in November 2023 against Newcastle Falcons.

Lewis signed for Dragons RFC ahead of the 2025–26 United Rugby Championship.

== International career ==
Lewis is a Wales under-20 international. He made his full Welsh international debut 16 June 2017 against Tonga.

In February 2024, having achieved more than 50 caps ahead of his move to Harlequins, Lewis was eligible to play for Wales. He was called up to the national side for 2024 Six Nations Championship by head coach Warren Gatland.

== Career statistics ==
=== List of international tries ===
No.	Date	Venue	Opponent	Score	Result	Competition
1	22 February 2020	Millennium Stadium, Cardiff, Wales	France	14–17	23–27	2020 Six Nations Championship

as of 22 February 2020
