= Marco Riccioni =

Italy international rugby union player

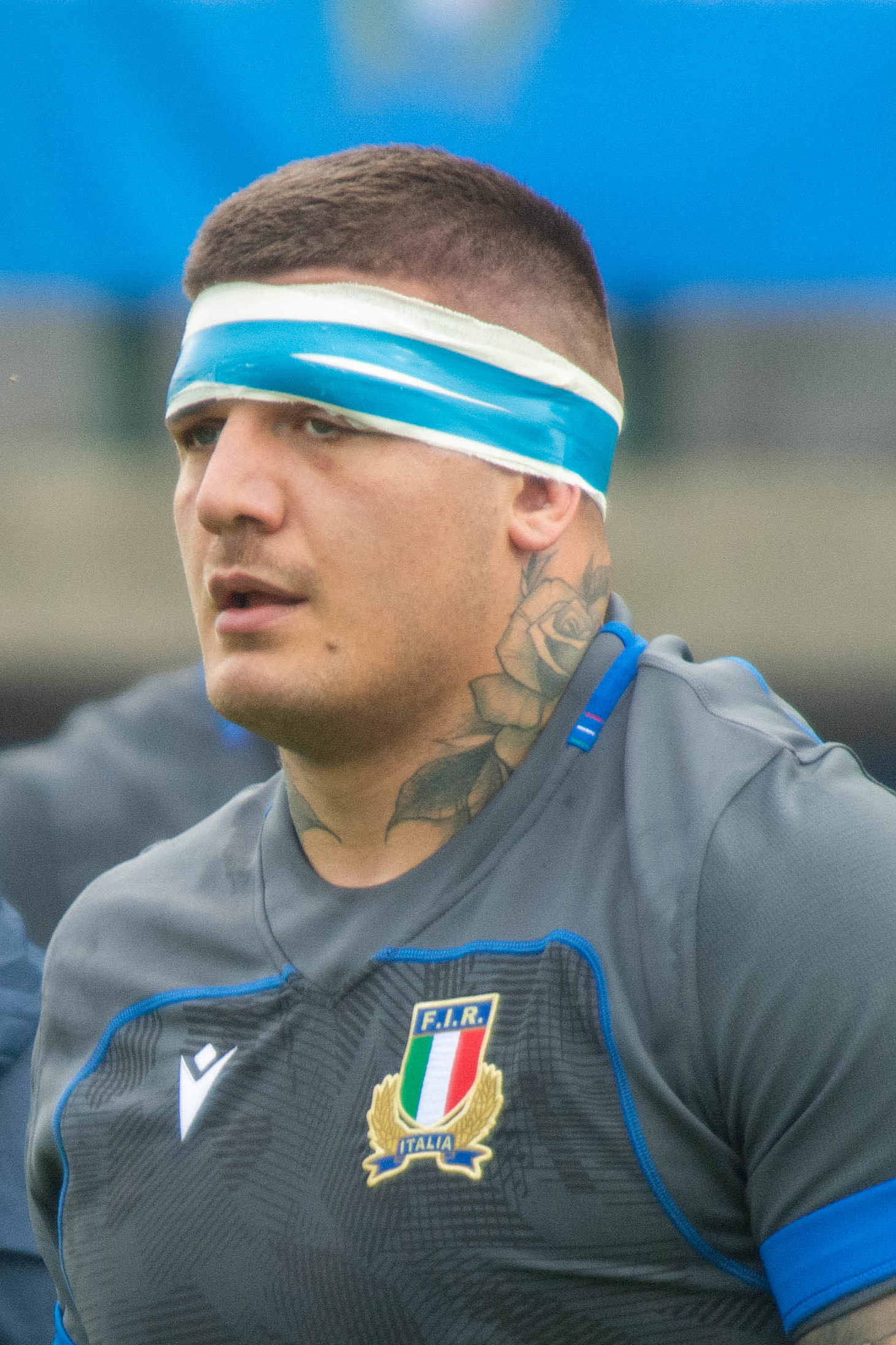
- Riccioni in 2021
- Born: 19 October 1997 (age 29) Teramo, Italy
- Height: 1.86 m (6 ft 1 in)
- Weight: 126 kg (278 lb; 19 st 12 lb)

Rugby union career
- Position: Tighthead Prop
- Current team: Perpignan
Youth career
- 2013−15: L'Aquila
Senior career
Years	Team	Apps	(Points)
2015−2017	Calvisano	23	(0)
2017−2021	Benetton	39	(5)
2021−2026	Saracens	74	(15)
2026−	Perpignan		
- Correct as of 30 Aug 2026
International career
Years	Team	Apps	(Points)
2015−17	Italy Under 20	20	(5)
2017–	Italy	39	(5)
- Correct as of 30 Aug 2026

Marco Riccioni (born 19 October 1997) is an Italian rugby union prop who currently plays for Perpignan and Italy.

Riccioni played with Italian Pro14 team Benetton from 2017 to 2021. He joined Saracens ahead of the 2021–22 season. He helped Saracens win the Premiership title in 2023, starting in the final where they defeated Sale Sharks.

At the start of the 2026–2027 season, he joined the French side Perpignan in Top 14.

From 2015 to 2017, Riccioni was named in the Italy Under 20 squad. On 18 August 2019, he was named in the final 31-man squad for the 2019 Rugby World Cup.

On 22 August 2023, he was named in the Italy's 33-man squad for the 2023 Rugby World Cup.

== International tries ==
As of 13 February 2021

Try	Opposing team	Location	Venue	Competition	Date	Result	Score
1	England	London, England	Twickenham Stadium	2023 Six Nations	12 February 2023	Loss	31–14
