= Rhys Davies (rugby union, born November 1998) =

Welsh rugby union player

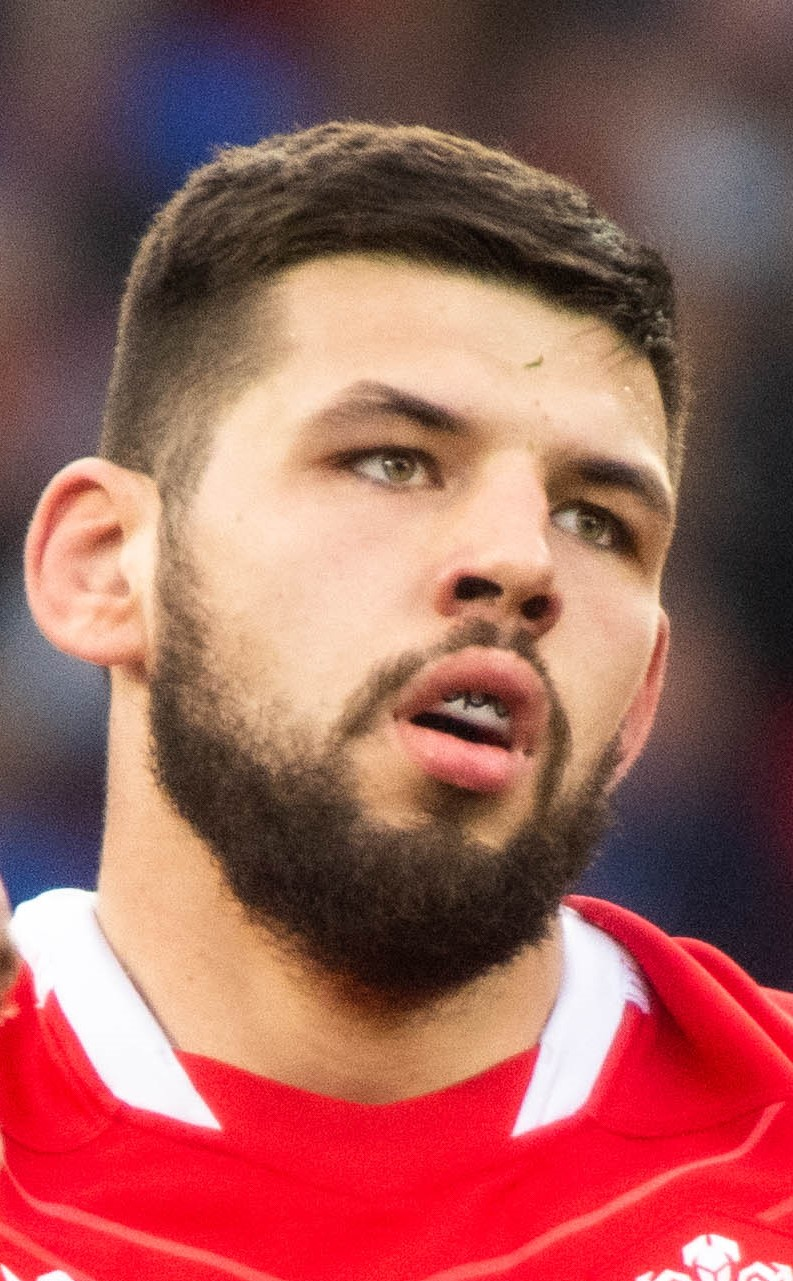
- Born: 9 November 1998 (age 28) Swansea, Wales
- Height: 1.96 m (6 ft 5 in)
- Weight: 123 kg (19.4 st; 271 lb)
- School: Millfield

Rugby union career
- Position: Lock
Senior career
Years	Team	Apps	(Points)
2019–2020	Bath	8	(0)
2020–	Ospreys	66	(10)
International career
Years	Team	Apps	(Points)
2018	Wales U20	5	(0)
2023–	Wales	4	(0)

Rhys Davies (born 9 November 1998) is a Welsh international rugby union player, who plays as a lock for Ospreys.

== Club career ==
=== Early years ===
Born in Swansea, Davies was part of the Ospreys academy setup until he was 16, when he accepted a scholarship to attend Millfield school in Street, Somerset.

=== Bath ===
He spent two years representing Bath's underage teams, before signing a three-year academy contract with the Premiership Rugby club ahead of the 2017–18 season. Davies returned to Ospreys on a two-year contract ahead of the 2020–21 season.

=== Ospreys ===
Davies made his Ospreys debut on 8 November 2020 against Leinster. Davies signed a three-year extension with the Ospreys on 2 March 2022.

== International career ==
=== Wales U20 ===
In 2018, Davies was selected for Wales U20 for the Six Nations Under 20s Championship and World Rugby Under 20 Championship.

=== Wales ===
Davies was called up to play for Wales in the 2021 Autumn internationals.

On 14 November 2022, Davies was called up for Wales as injury cover in the 2022 Autumn Internationals.

Davies was once again called up by Wales on 17 January 2023, as part of the squad for the 2023 Six Nations Championship. He made his debut on 11 February 2023, coming off the bench against Scotland.

Davies was named in the training squad ahead of the 2023 Rugby World Cup, and featured in the warm up match against England. Davies was not selected for the final squad.

Davies was named in the squad for the 2025 end-of-year rugby union internationals. He started against South Africa.

Davies was called up to the squad ahead of the 2026 Six Nations.
