= Huw Jones (rugby union) =

Scottish rugby union player (born 1993)

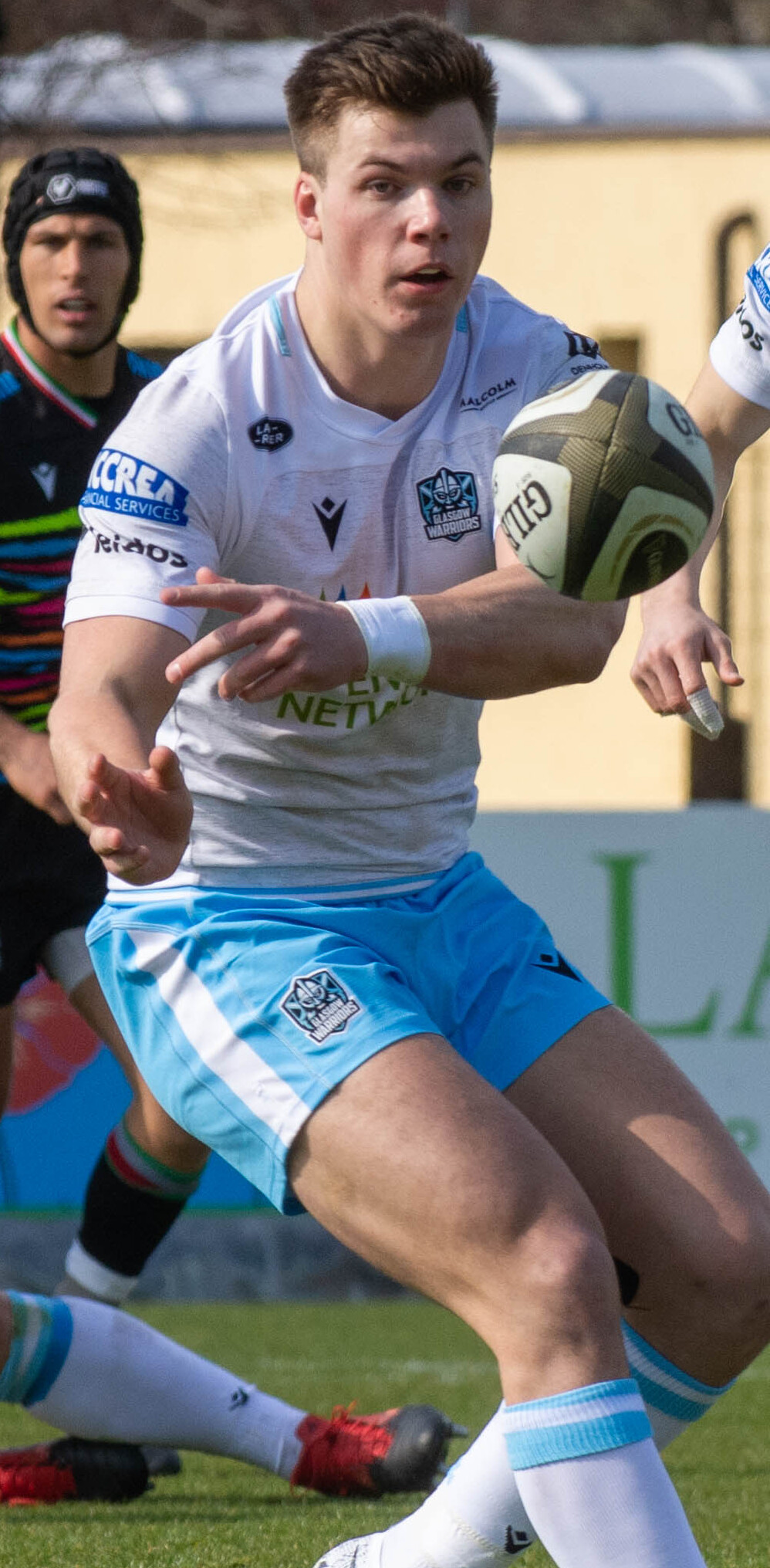
- Jones representing Glasgow Warriors during the Pro14
- Full name: Huw Richard Forbes Jones
- Born: 17 December 1993 (age 32) Edinburgh, Scotland
- Height: 1.86 m (6 ft 1 in)
- Weight: 102 kg (225 lb; 16 st 1 lb)
- School: Millfield
- University: University of Cape Town

Rugby union career
- Position: Centre
- Current team: Toulon
Senior career
Years	Team	Apps	(Points)
2014	Ikey Tigers	9	(10)
2014–2017	Western Province	27	(80)
2015–2016	Stormers	24	(25)
2017–2021	Glasgow Warriors	49	(60)
2021–2022	Harlequins	29	(35)
2022–2026	Glasgow Warriors	38	(80)
2026–	Toulon		
- Correct as of 19 July 2026
International career
Years	Team	Apps	(Points)
2016–	Scotland	65	(125)
2025	British & Irish Lions	3	(5)
- Correct as of 18 November 2026

Huw Richard Forbes Jones (born 17 December 1993) is a Scottish professional rugby union player who plays as a centre for Top 14 club Toulon and the Scotland national team.

== Early life ==
Jones was born in Leith in Edinburgh in the Eastern General Hospital to parents Bill and Hillary. At the time of Jones' birth, his father coached at George Watson's College where Scott Hastings was among those he coached. His parents had previously studied at Edinburgh University. Jones' maternal grandfather is also Scottish. His father is Welsh reflected in the name, Huw Jones.

When he was two years old his family moved from Musselburgh to Kent, and then Lincoln. Jones was later schooled at Millfield in Somerset.

== Club career ==
=== False Bay and UCT Ikey Tigers ===
After finishing his schooling, Jones moved to South Africa for his gap year where he worked at Bishops Preparatory School in Cape Town. He played club rugby for False Bay in 2013 and after the club's Director of Rugby, Kevin Musikanth, was appointed as head coach of the UCT Ikey Tigers Varsity Cup side, Jones followed Musikanth by enrolling at the University of Cape Town for 2014. He made a total of nine appearances for UCT during the 2014 Varsity Cup competition, scoring a try in their match against UP Tuks as UCT finished second in the pool stage. After beating Western Cape rivals Maties in the semi-finals, the UCT Ikey Tigers won the final against NWU Pukke in Potchefstroom. Jones opened the scoring for the visitors by scoring a try in the fourth minute and helped them clinch the title in dramatic fashion as they fought back from 33 to 15 down with five minutes to go to achieve a 39–33 victory to win the competition for the second time.

=== Western Province and Stormers ===
On the back of his performances for the UCT Ikey Tigers during the 2014 Varsity Cup, Jones was called up to the Vodacom Cup side of local provincial team, Western Province. He made his first class debut for them during the 2014 Vodacom Cup competition, starting in their match against the Free State XV in Round Six of the competition. He took just eleven minutes to score his first try at senior level, setting Western Province on their way to a 28–15 victory. He also started the final group game of the competition against the SWD Eagles in George.

In the latter half of 2014, he appeared for the Western Province U21 side in the 2014 Under-21 Provincial Championship, making three starts and scoring two tries in their match against the Sharks U21 team in Durban.

In 2015, Jones was included in the Stormers wider training group prior to the 2015 Super Rugby season. He scored a try in a trial match against the Cheetahs and was also included in their final squad. He was named on the bench for the opening match of the competition against the Bulls in Pretoria and came on as a replacement in the final minute of the match to make his Super Rugby debut. He also came off the bench in the next five matches, playing less than ten minutes on each occasion. He was promoted to the starting lineup for the Round Eight match against New Zealand side the Hurricanes in Wellington, starting at outside centre. In the 64th minute, Jones scored his first Super Rugby try, but it was not enough as the home side won 25–20. He reverted to his role as a replacement for the Stormers, making a further six appearances off the bench throughout the remainder of the competition before starting the final match of the regular season, a 12–34 defeat to the Sharks. The Stormers finished top of the South African Conference to qualify for the finals, but Jones was not involved in their 19–39 defeat to the Brumbies in the eliminating qualifier.

He was included in Western Province's squad for the 2015 Currie Cup Premier Division and made his Currie Cup debut in the Round Three match away to the Blue Bulls, playing off the bench in a 29–47 defeat. He made his first start three weeks later against the Sharks, the start of an extended run in the team that saw him make four starts and four appearances as a replacement during the competition, scoring one try in the home match against the Blue Bulls. The final two of these appearances occurred in the play-offs after Western Province finished third on the log during the regular season; a last-minute substitute appearance in their 23–18 victory over the Blue Bulls in their semi-final match was followed by another appearance off the bench in the final, which the Golden Lions won 32–24 in Johannesburg.

Jones was involved in the Stormers' 2016 Super Rugby season, making six appearances off the bench prior to the international break, during which time he earned his first international call-up for Scotland.

On 28 October 2017, Jones scored two tries in a Man of the Match farewell performance as Western Province beat the Natal Sharks in the final to win the 2017 Currie Cup.

=== Glasgow Warriors ===
Jones has stated that he always felt Scottish. He has kept a saltire above his bed since he was 11. When Jones started playing for the University of Cape Town he insisted on being referred to as Scottish. A saltire next to his name caught the attention of Gavin Vaughan of Glasgow Warriors when he was watching a televised game from South Africa in which Jones was playing. According to some sources it seems it was a Wikipedia article that allowed Gavin Vaughan to see that Huw Jones was Scottish.

In February 2017, it was announced that the 2017 Super Rugby season would be Jones' last for the Stormers before he returned to Scotland. He joined Warriors 10 months later midway through the 2017–18 after the Currie Cup Final in South Africa.

Jones was drafted to Currie in the Scottish Premiership for the 2018–19 season.

On 25 December 2017, Glasgow Warriors announced that Jones had signed a contract until at least 2021. Jones cited the world class coaching as one of the reasons behind his decision.

Jones latterly was not selected, having struggled to assure coach Dave Rennie about his defence. He subsequently strongly improved this area of his game.

=== Harlequins ===
On 26 February 2021, it was confirmed that Jones would leave Glasgow to travel to France to sign for Top 14 side Bayonne ahead of the 2021–22 season. However the move to Bayonne fell through when the French club were relegated to Rugby Pro D2. He signed for English side Harlequins in the Premiership Rugby for the 2021–22 season.

=== Glasgow ===
Jones returned to Glasgow in 2022, playing under coach Franco Smith and often in centre partnership with Sione Tuipulotu.

== International career ==
In May 2016, Jones was called up to the Scotland squad and made his Test debut during their 2016 summer tour of Japan. In November 2016 he played his first home match for Scotland against Australia, scoring two tries in the narrow defeat.

In February 2017, he was named in Scotland's squad for the 2017 Six Nations, starting their first two games against Ireland and France. During the 2017 Autumn Internationals, Jones scored tries in all three matches, against Samoa, the All Blacks and Australia.

Jones played all five of Scotland matches in the 2018 Six Nations, scoring 2 tries in Scotland's Calcutta Cup victory over England.

Jones played in the opening three matches of the 2019 Six Nations but was injured in Scotland's loss to Ireland and was ruled out for the remainder of the tournament. After being omitted from Scotland's 2019 Rugby World Cup squad, Jones was recalled for the 2020 Six Nations.

Jones was included in the 2023 Six Nations team of the tournament, as voted by the public. Jones was selected in Scotland's 33 player squad for the 2023 Rugby World Cup in France.

== British and Irish Lions ==
In May 2025, Jones was selected by head coach Andy Farrell for the 2025 British & Irish Lions tour to Australia.

He made his debut in the first tour match in Australia, a 7–54 victory over Western Force, becoming Lion #878. He scored a try in the second match against the Queensland Reds and two more in the following Saturday's 10–21 victory over the New South Wales Waratahs.

Jones was selected to start the first test and played the full 80 minutes of the 19–27 victory, during which he had a try disallowed. He was subsequently selected for the second test, in which he scored a try as the Lions secured a series victory.

== Career statistics ==
=== List of international tries ===
==== Scotland ====
No.	Date	Venue	Opponent	Score	Result	Competition
1	12 November 2016	Murrayfield Stadium, Edinburgh, Scotland	Australia	8–0	22–23	2016 end-of-year rugby union internationals
2	12 November 2016	Murrayfield Stadium, Edinburgh, Scotland	Australia	15–10	22–23	2016 end-of-year rugby union internationals
3	11 March 2017	Twickenham Stadium, London, England	England	12–40	21–61	2017 Six Nations Championship
4	11 March 2017	Twickenham Stadium, London, England	England	19–47	21–61	2017 Six Nations Championship
5	11 November 2017	Murrayfield Stadium, Edinburgh, Scotland	Samoa	18–10	44–38	2017 end-of-year rugby union internationals
6	18 November 2017	Murrayfield Stadium, Edinburgh, Scotland	New Zealand	15–22	17–22	2017 end-of-year rugby union internationals
7	25 November 2017	Murrayfield Stadium, Edinburgh, Scotland	Australia	39–17	53–24	2017 end-of-year rugby union internationals
8	11 February 2018	Murrayfield Stadium, Edinburgh, Scotland	France	12–17	32–26	2018 Six Nations Championship
9	24 February 2018	Murrayfield Stadium, Edinburgh, Scotland	England	8–3	25–13	2018 Six Nations Championship
10	24 February 2018	Murrayfield Stadium, Edinburgh, Scotland	England	20–6	25–13	2018 Six Nations Championship
11	14 March 2021	Murrayfield Stadium, Edinburgh, Scotland	Ireland	15–24	24–27	2021 Six Nations Championship
12	20 March 2021	Murrayfield Stadium, Edinburgh, Scotland	Italy	26–10	52–10	2021 Six Nations Championship
13	4 February 2023	Twickenham Stadium, London, England	England	5–0	23–29	2023 Six Nations Championship
14	26 February 2023	Stade de France, Saint-Denis, France	France	5–19	21–32	2023 Six Nations Championship
15	26 February 2023	Stade de France, Saint-Denis, France	France	10–22	21–32	2023 Six Nations Championship
16	12 March 2023	Murrayfield Stadium, Edinburgh, Scotland	Ireland	5–3	7–22	2023 Six Nations Championship
17	16 March 2024	Aviva Stadium, Dublin, Ireland	Ireland	11–17	13–17	2024 Six Nations Championship
18	2 November 2024	Murrayfield Stadium, Edinburgh, Scotland	Fiji	24–0	55–17	2024 end-of-year rugby union internationals
19	2 November 2024	Murrayfield Stadium, Edinburgh, Scotland	Fiji	53–17	55–17	2024 end-of-year rugby union internationals
20	1 February 2025	Murrayfield Stadium, Edinburgh, Scotland	Italy	12–0	31–19	2025 Six Nations Championship
21	1 February 2025	Murrayfield Stadium, Edinburgh, Scotland	Italy	24–19	31–19	2025 Six Nations Championship
22	1 February 2025	Murrayfield Stadium, Edinburgh, Scotland	Italy	31–19	31–19	2025 Six Nations Championship
23	22 February 2025	Twickenham Stadium, London, England	England	10–7	15–16	2025 Six Nations Championship
24	14 February 2026	Murrayfield Stadium, Edinburgh, Scotland	England	5-0	31-20	2026 Six Nations Championship
25	14 February 2026	Murrayfield Stadium, Edinburgh, Scotland	England	29-13	31-20	2026 Six Nations Championship

as of 16 February 2026
