= Sekou Macalou =

French rugby union player (born 1995)

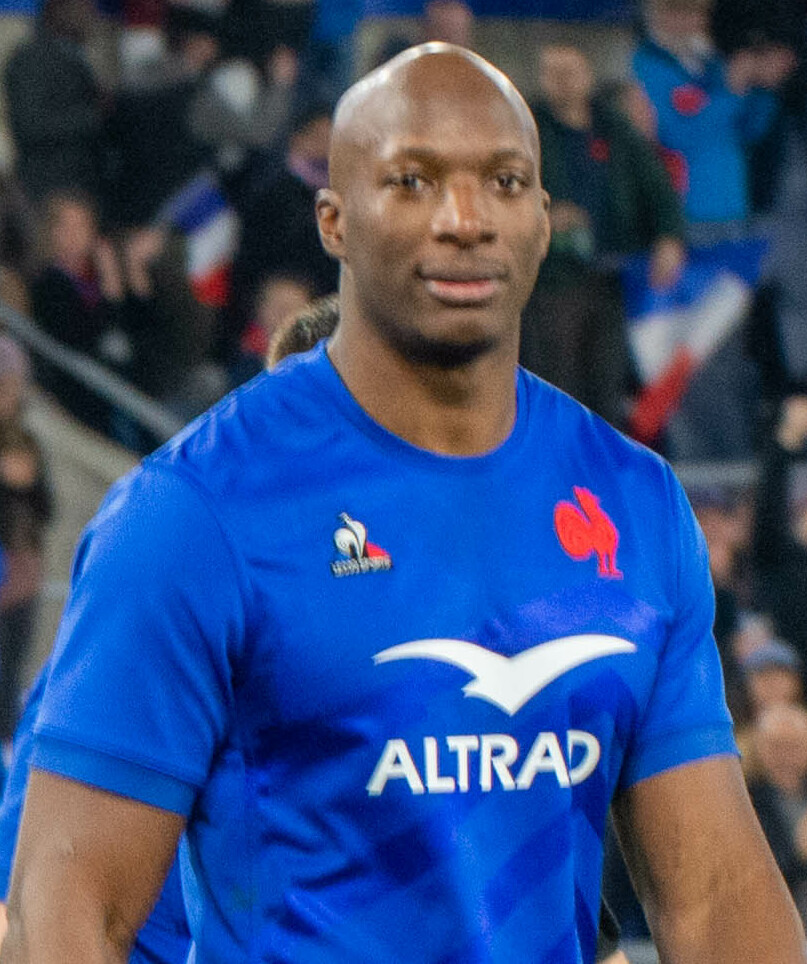
- Macalou representing France during the Six Nations Championship
- Born: 20 April 1995 (age 31) Sarcelles, France
- Height: 1.95 m (6 ft 5 in)
- Weight: 108 kg (238 lb; 17 st 0 lb)

Rugby union career
- Position(s): Flanker, Number 8, Wing
- Current team: Stade Français
Senior career
Years	Team	Apps	(Points)
2013–2015	Massy	19	(10)
2015–	Stade Français	180	(285)
- Correct as of 19 April 2023
International career
Years	Team	Apps	(Points)
2015	France U20	7	(10)
2017–	France	20	(10)
- Correct as of 15 October 2023
National sevens team
Years	Team		Comps
2013–2014	France		4
- Correct as of 18 March 2023

Sekou Macalou (born 20 April 1995) is a French professional rugby union player who plays as a flanker for Top 14 club Stade Français and the France national team.

== Personal life ==
Born in France, Macalou is of Malian descent.
