= Reda Wardi =

France international rugby union player

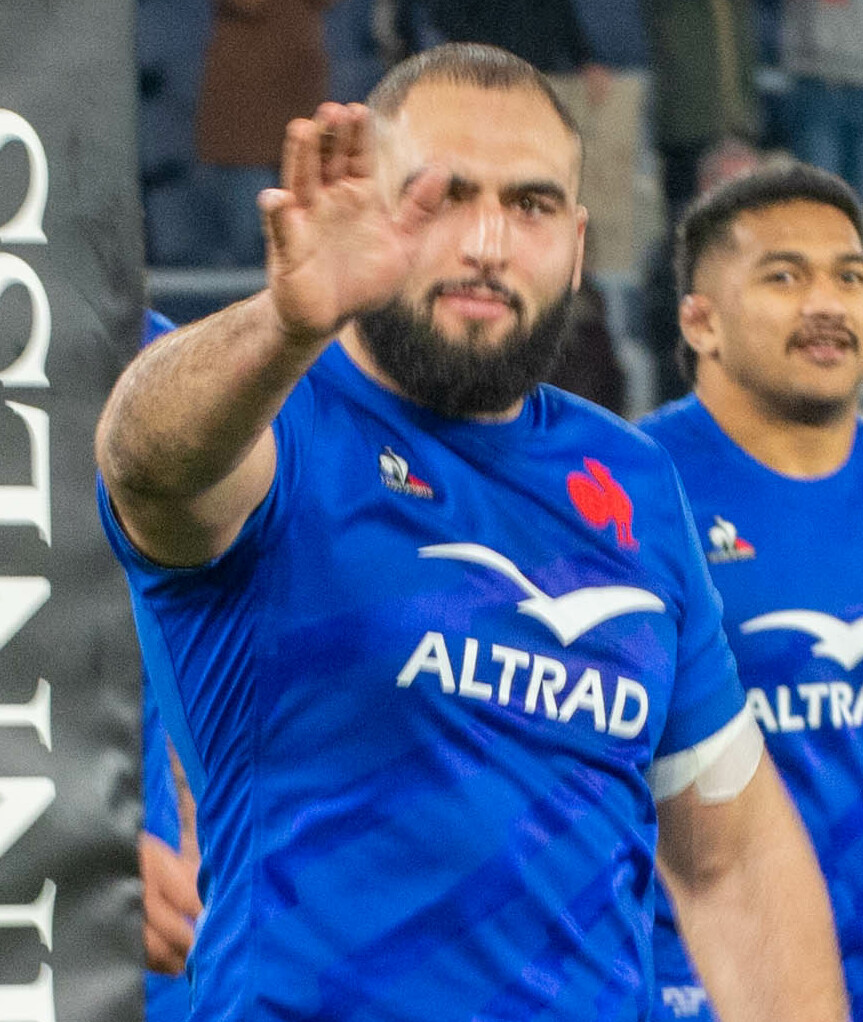
- Wardi representing France during the Six Nations Championship
- Born: 2 August 1995 (age 31) Montpellier, France
- Height: 1.85 m (6 ft 1 in)
- Weight: 110 kg (243 lb; 17 st 5 lb)

Rugby union career
- Position: Prop
- Current team: La Rochelle
Senior career
Years	Team	Apps	(Points)
2015–2019	Béziers	59	(0)
2019–	La Rochelle	115	(15)
- Correct as of 9 November 2024
International career
Years	Team	Apps	(Points)
2022–	France	16	(0)
- Correct as of 22 November 2024

Reda Wardi (born 2 August 1995) is a French professional rugby union player who plays as a prop for Top 14 club La Rochelle and the France national team.

== Professional career ==
Having gone through the Montpellier HR academy, Reda Wardi started his career with the AS Béziers Hérault in Prod D2, before joining the Stade Rochelais in 2019.

Reda Wardi was first called to the France senior team in October 2022 for the Autumn internationals.
