= 2021–22 Premiership Rugby Cup =

Tournament details
- Countries: England
- Tournament format(s): Round-robin and knockout
- Date: 12 November 2021 — 18 May 2022

Tournament statistics
- Teams: 13

Final
- Venue: Brentford Community Stadium
- Attendance: 9,531
- Champions: Worcester Warriors (1st title)
- Runners-up: London Irish

The 2021–22 Premiership Rugby Cup is the 49th season of England's national rugby union cup competition and the third under the new Premiership Rugby Cup format following the disbanding of the Anglo-Welsh Cup at the end of the 2017–18 season due to the withdrawal of the Welsh Pro14 regions. Although there are no stipulations on player selection, the cup will be seen by many clubs as a development competition, and games will take place during the Autumn internationals and during the Six Nations.

The competition returns after a one-year hiatus due to cancellation of the 2020–21 competition. Sale Sharks enter the competition as reigning champions, becoming the second winners of the Premiership Cup when they defeated Harlequins 27–19 at the AJ Bell Stadium in the 2019–20 final.

== Competition format ==
The competition consists of the thirteen Premiership Rugby teams arranged in three pools. Pool 1 will consist of five teams whilst pools B and C will consist of four. Each team will play each team in their pool once only and, in the case of pools 2 and 3, also play an additional inter pool match. There will be five rounds of matches meaning each team will receive one bye. The top team in each pool, plus the best overall runner-up, will progress to the semi-finals, with the highest ranked teams having home advantage. The winners of the semi-finals will then meet at the final in May 2022 to be held at the home ground of the highest ranked remaining team.

=== Teams ===
2021–22 Premiership Rugby Cup teams
Greater London Premiership Rugby Cup teams

Club	Director of Rugby/Head Coach	Captain	Kit supplier	Stadium	Capacity	City/Area
Bath	(England) Stuart Hooper	(England) Charlie Ewels	Macron	The Recreation Ground	14,509	Bath
Bristol Bears	(Samoa) Pat Lam	(New Zealand) Steve Luatua	Umbro	Ashton Gate	27,000	Bristol
Exeter Chiefs	(England) Rob Baxter	(England) Jack Yeandle (England) Joe Simmonds	Samurai Sportswear	Sandy Park	13,593	Exeter
Gloucester	(England) George Skivington	(England) Lewis Ludlow	Oxen Sports	Kingsholm Stadium	16,115	Gloucester
Harlequins	(Australia) Billy Millard	(South Africa) Stephan Lewies	Adidas	Twickenham Stoop	14,800	Twickenham, Greater London
Leicester Tigers	(England) Steve Borthwick	(England) Ellis Genge	Samurai Sportswear	Mattioli Woods Welford Road	25,849	Leicester
London Irish	(Ireland) Declan Kidney	(England) Matt Rogerson	BLK	Brentford Community Stadium	17,250	Brentford, Greater London
Newcastle Falcons	(England) Dean Richards	(England) Mark Wilson	Macron	Kingston Park	10,200	Newcastle upon Tyne
Northampton Saints	(New Zealand) Chris Boyd	(England) Lewis Ludlam	Macron	cinch Stadium at Franklin's Gardens	15,200	Northampton
Sale Sharks	(England) Alex Sanderson	(South Africa) Jono Ross	Macron	AJ Bell Stadium	12,000	Salford, Greater Manchester
Saracens	(Ireland) Mark McCall	(England) Owen Farrell	Castore	StoneX Stadium	8,500	Hendon, Greater London
Wasps	(England) Lee Blackett	(England) Joe Launchbury	Hummel	Coventry Building Society Arena	32,609	Coventry
Worcester Warriors	(South Africa) Alan Solomons	(England) Ted Hill	O'Neills	Sixways Stadium	11,499	Worcester

== Pools ==
=== Pool 1 ===
Pool 1
	Club	Played	Won	Drawn	Lost	Points for	Points against	Points difference	Tries for	Tries against	Try bonus	Losing bonus	Points
1	Gloucester	4	3	0	1	180	71	+109	23	10	2	1	16
2	Worcester Warriors	4	3	0	1	137	72	65	+19	11	3	1	16
3	Exeter Chiefs	4	2	0	2	105	107	−2	11	15	2	1	11*
4	Bristol Bears	4	2	0	2	122	157	-35	18	19	2	0	10
5	Bath	4	0	0	4	36	173	−137	5	21	0	1	1*
If teams are level at any stage, tiebreakers are applied in the following order: 1. Number of matches won 2. Difference between points for and against 3. Total number of points for 4. Total number of tries scored
Green background means the club has qualified for the semi-finals as pool winner. Blue background means the club has qualified for the semi-finals as the best pool runner-up. Updated: 14 November 2021; Note that each team plays 4 games.: Cancelled fixture: Bath 0 points; Exeter 5 points

=== Pool 2 ===
Pool 2
	Club	Played	Won	Drawn	Lost	Points for	Points against	Points difference	Tries for	Tries against	Try bonus	Losing bonus	Points
1	Leicester Tigers	4	3	0	1	156	92	+64	20	14	3	0	15
2	Newcastle Falcons	4	2	0	2	116	114	+2	15	10	2	1	11
3	Wasps	4	2	0	2	115	136	−21	17	21	2	1	11
4	Sale Sharks	4	2	0	2	108	122	−14	16	17	2	0	5*
If teams are level at any stage, tiebreakers are applied in the following order: 1. Number of matches won 2. Difference between points for and against 3. Total number of points for 4. Total number of tries scored
Green background means the club has qualified for the semi-finals as pool winner. Blue background means the club has qualified for the semi-finals as the best pool runner-up. Updated: 14 November 2021; Note that each team plays 4 games; 3 pool games plus a derby game against a team in another pool.: Sale Sharks were deducted 5 points for fielding an ineligible player

=== Pool 3 ===
Pool 3
	Club	Played	Won	Drawn	Lost	Points for	Points against	Points difference	Tries for	Tries against	Try bonus	Losing bonus	Points
1	London Irish	4	3	0	1	125	106	+19	18	16	4	0	16
2	Northampton Saints	4	2	0	2	131	123	+8	19	18	3	1	12
3	Harlequins	4	1	0	2	95	121	−26	15	18	2	2	8
4	Saracens	4	1	0	2	104	136	-32	15	20	2	0	6
If teams are level at any stage, tiebreakers are applied in the following order: 1. Number of matches won 2. Difference between points for and against 3. Total number of points for 4. Total number of tries scored
Green background means the club has qualified for the semi-finals as pool winner. Blue background means the club has qualified for the semi-finals as the best pool runner-up. Updated: 14 November 2021; Note that each team plays 4 games; 3 pool games plus a derby game against a team in another pool.

== Fixtures ==
=== Round 1 ===
12 November 2021
19:45

(1 BP) Gloucester	71 – 10	Bath
Try: Morgan (3) 7' c, 39' c, 43' c Moyle 11' c Ludlow 25' c Ackermann 32' m Davidson 41' c Balmain 47' c Clement (2) 54' c, 75' m Morris 67' m Con: Evans (8/11) 8', 12', 27', 40', 41', 44', 48', 55'	Report	Try: Worboys 60' c Con: Worboys (1/1) 61'; Pen: Worboys (1/1) 17'

Kingsholm

13 November 2021
14:30

(1 BP) Saracens	28 – 21	Harlequins (1 BP)
Try: Barrington 14' c Morris 30' c McFarland (2) 39' c, 48' c Con: Man. Vunipola (4/4) 16', 31', 40', 50'	Report	Try: Jurevicius 33' c White 45' c David 73' c Con: Benson (3/3) 34', 46', 74'

StoneX Stadium

13 November 2021
15:00

(1 BP) Exeter Chiefs	27 – 33	Bristol Bears (1 BP)
Try: Kenny 3' c Walsh (2) 17' c, 50' c Con: Hodge (3/3) 4', 18', 51'; Pen: Hodge (2/2) 44', 80+4'	Report	Try: Penalty Try 35'; Bedlow 37' c Capon 59' m Thomas 62' c Duncan 74' c Con: Bedlow (3/4) 38', 63', 75'

Sandy Park

13 November 2021
15:00

Leicester Tigers	32 – 23	Sale Sharks
Try: van Poortvliet 18' c Porter 78' c Con: Hegarty (1/1) 19'; Lancaster (1/1) 79'; Pen: Hegarty (5/5) 6', 17', 22', 40', 42'; Lancaster (1/1) 53'	Report	Try: Reed 26' c Dugdale (2) 56' m, 67' m Con: Curtis (1/3) 26'; Pen: Curtis (2/2) 2', 50'

Mattioli Woods Welford Road
Attendance: 15,745
Referee: Andrew Jackson

13 November 2021
15:00

(1 BP) Newcastle Falcons	34 – 27	Wasps (1 BP)
Try: Tait (2) 12' m, 58' c Montgomery 22' m Stephens 40' c Basham 51' m Graham 79' m Con: Hodgson (2/6) 40+1', 59'	Report	Try: Hartley 15' c Tunney 25' c van Vuuren 36' c Con: Mathews (3/3) 16', 26', 37'; Pen: Mathews (2/2) 21', 68'

Kingston Park

13 November 2021
15:30

(1 BP) Northampton Saints	26 – 36	London Irish (1 BP)
Try: Hendy 29' c Fish 54' c Gillespie 62' m Litchfield 70' c Con: J. Grayson (3/4) 30', 55', 71'	Report	Try: Stokes 12' c Munga 16' m Sullivan 21' c van Rensburg (2) 40' c, 74' c Con: Jennings (4/5) 13', 22', 40+1', 75'; Pen: Jennings (1/1) 78'

cinch Stadium at Franklin's Gardens

Bye/s: Worcester Warriors

=== Round 2 ===
19 November 2021
19:45

Sale Sharks	25 - 20	Newcastle Falcons (1 BP)
Try: Metclaf ‘26; Reed ‘37; Birch ‘72; Con: du Preez ‘28, ‘74; Pen: du Preez ‘11, ‘49		Try: Hayden-Wood ‘19; Earle ‘53; McGuigan ‘68; Con: Connon ‘20; Pen: Connon ‘45

AJ Bell Stadium
Attendance: 4,725
Referee: Nick Wood

19 November 2021
19:45

(1 BP) London Irish	29 - 20	Saracens
Try: Haskell-Collins ‘15; Hepetema ‘21; Mafi ‘28; Redmond ‘50; Con: Jennings ‘16, ‘22, ‘29; Pen: Jennings ‘79		Try: Segun ‘45; Harris ‘56, ‘60; Con: Manu Vunipola ‘57; Pen: Manu Vunipola ‘68

Brentford Community Stadium
Referee: Craig Maxwell-Keys

19 November 2021
19:45

(1 BP) Harlequins	26 - 25	Northampton Saints (1 BP)
Try: Anyanwu ‘4, ‘67; Steele ‘10; Wallace ‘72; Con: Benson ‘5, ‘11, ‘74		Try: Henry ‘14; Haywood ‘26; Gillespie ‘31; Con: Grayson ‘15, ‘27; Pen: Grayson ‘49, ‘60

Twickenham Stoop
Referee: Mike Hudson

20 November 2021
13:00

(1 BP) Gloucester	45 - 19	Exeter Chiefs
Try: Taylor ‘14; Morris ‘18; Morgan ‘26, ‘30; Barton ‘43; Reeves ‘75; Con: Evans ‘15, ‘21, ‘27, ‘32, ‘44; Twelvetrees ‘77; Pen: Evans ‘7		Try: Tuikma ‘36; Relton ’53; Hidalgo-Clyne’63; Con: Hodge ‘37; Walsh ‘64

Kingsholm
Referee: Jack Makepeace

20 November 2021
13:30

Wasps	7 - 55	Leicester Tigers (1 BP)
Try: Hartley ‘71; Con: Mathews ‘71		Try: Murimurivalu ‘6; Green ‘42; Porter ‘47, ‘55; Whitcombe ‘58; Saumaki ‘66, ‘75, ‘79; Con: Lancaster ‘2, ‘43, ‘46, ‘59, ‘76, ‘80+1; Pen: Lancaster ‘26

Coventry Building Society Arena
Referee: Hamish Smales

20 November 2021
15:00

(1 BP) Worcester Warriors	68 - 13	Bristol Bears
Try: Simpson ‘4, ‘26; Doel ‘10; Howe ‘31, ‘43; Thomas ‘36; Johnson ‘45; Dodd ‘56; Smith ‘61; Searle ‘78; Con: Searle ‘5, ‘11, ‘27, ‘32, ‘37, ‘43, ‘57, ‘62, ‘79		Try: Strang ‘7; Eadie ‘52; Pen: Lloyd ‘17

Sixways
Referee: Anthony Woodthorpe

Bye/s: Bath

=== Round 3 ===
29 December 2021

Bath	Cancelled; 0 - 28 (Note: Due to a combination of COVID-19 related absences and injuries Bath Rugby were unable to fulfil their fixture obligation. Exeter Chiefs were awarded a 28–0 BP win.)	Exeter Chiefs (1 BP)

The Recreation Ground

29 December 2021
19:45

(1 BP) Worcester Warriors	27 - 21	Gloucester (1 BP)

Sixways

Bye/s: Bristol Bears
Harlequins
Leicester Tigers
London Irish
Newcastle Falcons
Northampton Saints
Sale Sharks
Saracens
Wasps

=== Round 4 ===
18 March 2022
19:45

(1 BP) Bristol Bears	61 - 19	Bath

Ashton Gate

18 March 2022
19:45

(1 BP) London Irish	34 - 19	Harlequins

Brentford Community Stadium

18 March 2022
19:45

(1 BP) Newcastle Falcons	36 - 28	Leicester Tigers (1 BP)

Kingston Park

19 March 2022
13:00

(1 BP) Sale Sharks	26 - 41	Wasps (1 BP)

AJ Bell Stadium

19 March 2022
15:00

(1 BP) Exeter Chiefs	31 - 29	Worcester Warriors (2 BP)

Sandy Park

19 March 2022
15:00

(1 BP) Saracens	34 - 46	Northampton Saints (1 BP)

StoneX Stadium

Bye/s: Gloucester

=== Round 5 ===
29 March 2022
19:45

(2 BP) Harlequins	29 - 34	Sale Sharks (1 BP)

Twickenham Stoop

29 March 2022
19:45

(1 BP) Leicester Tigers	41 - 26	London Irish (1 BP)

Mattioli Woods Welford Road

29 March 2022
19:45

(1 BP) Wasps	40 - 21	Saracens

Coventry Building Society Arena

30 March 2022
19:45

(1 BP) Bath	7 - 13	Worcester Warriors

Recreation Ground

30 March 2022
19:45

Bristol Bears	15 - 43	Gloucester (1 BP)

Ashton Gate

30 March 2022
19:45

(1 BP) Northampton Saints	34 - 26	Newcastle Falcons (1 BP)

cinch Stadium at Franklin's Gardens

Bye/s: Exeter Chiefs

=== Semi-final ===
26 April 2022
19:45

London Irish	59 - 20	Leicester Tigers

Brentford Community Stadium

27 April 2022
19:45

Gloucester Rugby	25 - 39	Worcester Warriors

Kingsholm

=== Final ===
17 May 2022
19:45

London Irish	25–25 (a.e.t.)	Worcester Warriors
Try: White 33' c Con: Jackson 36'; Pen: Jackson (5) 5', 28', 48', 58' 64'	Report	Try: Kvesic 12' c Humphreys 40' m Hatherell 80' c Con: Smith (2/3) 13', 80'; Pen: Smith (2) 7', 19'

Brentford Community Stadium
Attendance: 9,531
Referee: Wayne Barnes

London Irish
Worcester Warriors

FB	15	(England) Henry Arundell
RW	14	(Argentina) Lucio Cinti
OC	13	(England) Will Joseph
IC	12	(South Africa) Benhard Janse van Rensburg
LW	11	(England) Ollie Hassell-Collins
FH	10	(Ireland) Paddy Jackson
SH	9	(Scotland) Ben White
N8	8	(Fiji) Albert Tuisue
OF	7	(Argentina) Juan Martín González
BF	6	(England) Matt Rogerson (c)
RL	5	(Australia) Rob Simmons
LL	4	(England) Chunya Munga
TP	3	(South Africa) Marcel van der Merwe
HK	2	(South Africa) Mike Willemse
LP	1	(Argentina) Facundo Gigena
Substitutions:
HK	16	(England) Matt Cornish
PR	17	(England) Will Goodrick-Clarke
PR	18	(England) Ciaran Parker
LK	19	(Tonga) Steven Mafi
FL	20	(England) Ben Donnell
SH	21	(Ireland) Caolan Englefield
CE	22	(Australia) Curtis Rona
WG	23	(England) Ben Loader
Coach:
(Ireland) Declan Kidney

FB	15	(England) Jamie Shillcock
RW	14	(England) Perry Humphreys
OC	13	(South Africa) Francois Venter
IC	12	(Wales) Ashley Beck
LW	11	(Scotland) Duhan van der Merwe
FH	10	(England) Fin Smith
SH	9	(England) Gareth Simpson
N8	8	(England) Ted Hill (c)
OF	7	(England) Matt Kvesic
BF	6	(South Africa) Kyle Hatherell
RL	5	(England) Graham Kitchener
LL	4	(England) Joe Batley
TP	3	(England) Christian Judge
HK	2	(Ireland) Niall Annett
LP	1	(England) Ethan Waller
Substitutions:
HK	16	(Scotland) Isaac Miller
PR	17	(Scotland) Rory Sutherland
PR	18	(Scotland) Murray McCallum
LK	19	(England) Andrew Kitchener
FL	20	(Wales) Sam Lewis
SH	21	(England) Will Chudley
FH	22	(England) Ollie Lawrence
CE	23	(England) Alex Hearle
Coach:
(England) Steve Diamond

- Worcester were crowned champions due to having scored more tries than London Irish during the match

== See also ==
- Premiership Rugby
- Anglo-Welsh Cup
- 2021–22 RFU Championship Cup
- English rugby union system
- List of English rugby union teams
- Rugby union in England
