= 2020–21 European Rugby Challenge Cup =

Second-tier rugby union competition

Tournament details
- Countries: England; France; Ireland; Italy; Scotland; Wales
- Tournament format(s): Round-robin and knockout

Tournament statistics
- Teams: 14+8
- Matches played: 27
- Attendance: 12,000 (444 per match)
- Highest attendance: 10,000

Final
- Venue: Twickenham Stadium
- Attendance: 10,000
- Champions: (France) Montpellier (2nd title)
- Runners-up: (England) Leicester Tigers

The 2020–21 European Rugby Challenge Cup is the seventh edition of the European Rugby Challenge Cup, an annual second-tier rugby union competition for professional clubs. Including the predecessor competition, the original European Challenge Cup, this was the 25th edition of European club rugby's second-tier competition.

The tournament began in December 2020. The final, originally scheduled to be held at the Stade Vélodrome in Marseille, took place on 21 May 2021 at Twickenham Stadium.

On 11 January 2021 EPCR announced the competition was suspended temporarily due to new restrictions surrounding the COVID-19 pandemic. A revised format to finish the tournament was announced on 24 February 2021.

== Teams ==
Fourteen teams will qualified for the 2020–21 European Challenge Cup from Premiership Rugby, the Pro14 and the Top 14, as a direct result of their domestic league performance having not qualified for the Heineken Champions Cup. Although, the two South African Pro14 teams are not eligible.

The distribution of teams was:

- England: four teams
  - Any teams finishing between 9th and 11th position in the Premiership Rugby that do not qualify for the 2020–21 European Champions Cup
  - The champion of the RFU Championship
- France: six teams
  - Any teams finishing between 9th and 14th position in the Top 14 that do not qualify for the 2020–21 European Champions Cup
- Ireland, Italy, Scotland, Wales: four teams
  - Four teams from the Pro14, excluding the South African teams, that do not qualify for the 2020–21 European Champions Cup

Round	Premiership	Top 14	Pro14			
	England	France	Ireland	Italy	Scotland	Wales
Preliminary stage	Leicester Tigers; London Irish; Newcastle Falcons; Worcester Warriors	Agen; Bayonne; Brive; Castres; Pau; Stade Français		Benetton; Zebre		Cardiff Blues; Ospreys
Knockout stage	Bath; Harlequins; Northampton Saints	Montpellier	Connacht; Ulster		Glasgow Warriors	Dragons

=== Team details ===
Below is the list of coaches, captain and stadiums with their method of qualification for each team.

Team	Coach / Director of Rugby	Captain	Stadium	Capacity	Method of qualification
Entering at Preliminary Stage
(France) Agen	(France) Christophe Laussucq (France) Rémi Vaquin	(France) Antoine Erbani	Stade Armandie	14,000	Top 14 bottom 6 (13th)
(France) Bayonne	(France) Yannick Bru	(France) Antoine Battut	Stade Jean Dauger	16,934	Top 14 bottom 6 (11th)
(Italy) Benetton	(New Zealand) Kieran Crowley	(South Africa) Dewaldt Duvenage	Stadio Comunale di Monigo	6,700	Pro14 Conference B (5th)
(France) Brive	(Ireland) Jeremy Davidson	(Algeria) Saïd Hireche	Stade Amédée-Domenech	13,979	Top 14 bottom 6 (10th)
(Wales) Cardiff Blues	(Australia) John Mulvihill	(Wales) Ellis Jenkins	Cardiff Arms Park	12,125	Pro14 Conference B (6th)
(France) Castres	(Argentina) Mauricio Reggiardo	(France) Mathieu Babillot	Stade Pierre-Fabre	12,500	Top 14 bottom 6 (9th)
(England) Leicester Tigers	(England) Steve Borthwick	(England) Tom Youngs	Welford Road Stadium	25,849	Premiership 9th–11th (11th)
(England) London Irish	(Ireland) Declan Kidney	(Scotland) Blair Cowan (Ireland) Paddy Jackson (Australia) Nick Phipps (England) Matt Rogerson	Brentford Community Stadium	17,250	Premiership 9th–11th (10th)
(England) Newcastle Falcons	(England) Dean Richards	(England) Mark Wilson	Kingston Park	10,200	RFU Championship champions
(Wales) Ospreys	(England) Toby Booth	(Wales) Justin Tipuric	Liberty Stadium	20,827	Pro14 Conference A (7th)
(France) Pau	(France) Nicolas Godignon (France) Frédéric Manca	(France) Quentin Lespiaucq-Brettes	Stade du Hameau	18,324	Top 14 bottom 6 (12th)
(France) Stade Français	(France) Laurent Sempéré (France) Julien Arias	(France) Yoann Maestri	Stade Jean-Bouin	20,000	Top 14 bottom 6 (14th)
(Italy) Zebre	(Ireland) Michael Bradley	(Italy) Tommaso Castello	Stadio Sergio Lanfranchi	5,000	Pro14 Conference A (6th)
(England) Worcester Warriors	(South Africa) Alan Solomons	(England) Ted Hill (Note: Hill was named as Worcester's club captain in July 2020, with Matt Moulds serving as team captain.)	Sixways Stadium	11,499	Premiership 9th–11th (9th)
Entering at Knockout Stage (transferred from Champions Cup)
(England) Bath	(England) Stuart Hooper	(England) Charlie Ewels	The Recreation Ground	14,509	Champions Cup Pool A 9th–12th (10th)
(Ireland) Connacht	(Australia) Andy Friend	(Australia) Jarrad Butler	Galway Sportsgrounds	8,129	Champions Cup Pool B 9th–12th (10th)
(Wales) Dragons	(England) Dean Ryan	(Wales) Rhodri Williams	Rodney Parade	8,700	Champions Cup Pool A 9th–12th (12th)
(Scotland) Glasgow Warriors	(England) Danny Wilson	(Scotland) Fraser Brown (Scotland) Ryan Wilson	Scotstoun Stadium	7,351	Champions Cup Pool B 9th–12th (12th)
(England) Harlequins	(Australia) Billy Millard	(South Africa) Stephan Lewies	Twickenham Stoop	14,800	Champions Cup Pool B 9th–12th (11th)
(France) Montpellier	(France) Xavier Garbajosa	(France) Fulgence Ouedraogo	Altrad Stadium	15,697	Champions Cup Pool A 9th–12th (11th)
(England) Northampton Saints	(New Zealand) Chris Boyd	(England) Lewis Ludlam (England) Alex Waller	Franklin's Gardens	15,200	Champions Cup Pool A 9th–12th (9th)
(Ireland) Ulster	(England) Dan McFarland	(Ireland) Iain Henderson	Ravenhill Stadium	18,196	Champions Cup Pool B 9th–12th (9th)

== Preliminary stage ==
Locations
Locations of teams of the European Rugby Challenge Cup.
Red: Competed in pool stage; Green: Entered from Champions Cup.

Teams were placed into one of the two tiers, with the higher ranked clubs being put in Tier 1. The nature of the tier system meant that no draw was needed this year. Brackets show each team's ranking and their league. e.g. 9 Top 14 indicates the team was the ninth placed team from the Top 14.

Tier 1	(France) Bayonne (11 Top 14)	(Italy) Benetton (9 Pro14)	(France) Brive (10 Top 14)	(Wales) Cardiff Blues (10 Pro14)	(France) Castres (9 Top 14)	(England) London Irish (10 Prem)	(England) Worcester Warriors (9 Prem)
Tier 2	(France) Agen (13 Top 14)	(England) Leicester Tigers (11 Prem)	(England) Newcastle Falcons (12 Prem)	(Wales) Ospreys (12 Pro14)	(France) Pau (12 Top 14)	(France) Stade Français (14 Top 14)	(Italy) Zebre (11 Top 14)

The preliminary stage would consist of a single pool of 14 teams. No team would play a team in the same tier and no club would play another club from the same league. Each team was scheduled to play four matches with the top eight teams advancing to the knockout stage. The top eight teams were due to be joined in the round of 16 by the teams finishing between 5th and 8th in each pool of the 2020–21 European Rugby Champions Cup pool stage.

The revised format announced in February 2021 would see the top 8 teams after 2 pool games advance to the round of 16 along with the eight teams placed between 9th and 12th in each pool of the Champions Cup.

Key to colours
Top 8, advance to round of 16
Eliminated from tournament

Team	P	W	D	L	PF	PA	Diff	TF	TA	TB	LB	Pts
(England) London Irish	2	2	0	0	60	25	+35	9	3	2	0	10
(Wales) Ospreys	2	2	0	0	77	44	+33	9	6	2	0	10
(Wales) Cardiff Blues	2	2	0	0	61	20	+41	7	2	1	0	9
(England) Leicester Tigers	2	2	0	0	67	37	+30	7	3	1	0	9
(Italy) Zebre	2	1	1	0	43	41	+2	5	4	0	0	6
(France) Agen	2	1	0	1	36	34	+2	5	5	1	0	5
(Italy) Benetton	2	1	0	1	44	48	−4	7	7	1	0	5
(England) Newcastle Falcons	2	1	0	1	46	50	−4	5	6	0	0	4
(France) Pau	2	1	0	1	41	46	−5	5	6	0	0	4
(France) Bayonne	2	0	1	1	45	53	−8	5	6	0	0	2
(England) Worcester Warriors	2	0	0	2	49	62	−13	6	7	1	1	2
(France) Brive	2	0	0	2	33	57	−24	2	6	0	1	1
(France) Castres	2	0	0	2	32	65	−33	5	8	0	0	0
(France) Stade Français	2	0	0	2	20	72	−52	3	11	0	0	0

=== Last 16 rankings ===
Key to colours
Top 8 in Challenge Cup	Champions Cup 17th-24th

Team	P	W	D	L	PF	PA	Diff	TF	TA	TB	LB	Pts
(England) London Irish	2	2	0	0	60	25	+35	9	3	2	0	10
(Wales) Ospreys	2	2	0	0	77	44	+33	9	6	2	0	10
(Wales) Cardiff Blues	2	2	0	0	61	20	+41	7	2	1	0	9
(England) Leicester Tigers	2	2	0	0	67	37	+30	7	3	1	0	9
(Italy) Zebre	2	1	1	0	43	41	+2	5	4	0	0	6
(France) Agen	2	1	0	1	36	34	+2	5	5	1	0	5
(Italy) Benetton	2	1	0	1	44	48	−4	7	7	1	0	5
(England) Newcastle Falcons	2	1	0	1	46	50	−4	5	6	0	0	4
(Ireland) Ulster	2	0	0	2	56	67	−11	7	9	1	2	3
(Ireland) Connacht	2	0	0	2	40	53	−13	5	8	0	1	1
(England) Northampton Saints	2	0	0	2	31	51	−20	3	5	0	1	1
(England) Bath	2	0	0	2	19	51	−32	2	6	0	1	1
(France) Montpellier	2	0	0	2	28	68	−40	3	10	0	0	0
(Wales) Dragons	2	0	0	2	16	71	−55	2	11	0	0	0
(England) Harlequins	2	0	0	2	14	70	−56	2	9	0	0	0
(Scotland) Glasgow Warriors	2	0	0	2	0	70	−70	0	10	0	0	0

== Knockout stage ==
The knockout stage commenced with a round of 16 consisting of the top 8 ranked teams from the preliminary stage and the teams placed between 9th and 12th in each Champions Cup pool. Due to the truncation of the preliminary stage, a draw was used to determine matches in both round of 16 and quarter-finals but no team would face a team from the same league in the round of 16. Teams which won both their matches and were not awarded points due to COVID cancellations would be guaranteed home advantage. Therefore, Leicester Tigers, London Irish and Ospreys received home advantage.

The draw for the round of 16 and quarter-finals took place on 9 March 2021 in Lausanne, Switzerland.

=== Bracket ===
Round of 16
(England) Leicester Tigers	48
(Ireland) Connacht	32
(Wales) Ospreys	24
(England) Newcastle Falcons	28
(Wales) Dragons	39
(England) Northampton Saints	43
(England) Harlequins	21
(Ireland) Ulster	57
(Italy) Zebre	27
(England) Bath	35
(England) London Irish	41
(Wales) Cardiff Blues	35
(France) Montpellier	26
(Scotland) Glasgow Warriors	21
(Italy) Benetton	29
(France) Agen	16

Quarter-finals
(England) Leicester Tigers	39
(England) Newcastle Falcons	15
(England) Northampton Saints	27
(Ireland) Ulster	35
(England) Bath	26
(England) London Irish	13
(France) Montpellier	31
(Italy) Benetton	25

Semi-finals
(England) Leicester Tigers	33
(Ireland) Ulster	24
(England) Bath	10
(France) Montpellier	19

Final
(England) Leicester Tigers	17
(France) Montpellier	18

=== Round of 16 ===
Fixtures were announced on 16 March 2021.

2 April 2021
16:00 CET

Zebre (Italy)	27–35	(England) Bath
Try: Bruno 2' c, 9' c, 22' c Con: Canna (3/3) 3', 10', 23'; Pen: Pescetto (2/3) 67', 71'	Report	Try: Cokanasiga 14' c Stuart 40' c Obano 45' c Watson 61' c du Toit 78' c

Stadio Sergio Lanfranchi
Attendance: 0
Referee: Pierre Brousset (France)

2 April 2021
17:30 BST

London Irish (England)	41–35	(Wales) Cardiff Blues
Try: Loader 30' c Hassell-Collins (2) 49' c, 74' c Hepetema 71' c Rona 79' c Con: Jackson (5/5) 31', 49', 72', 76', 80'; Pen: Jackson (2/3) 13', 39'	Report	Try: Dacey 16' c Adams 20' c Harries 57' m L. Williams 64' c Con: Evans (3/4) 17', 20', 65'; Pen: Evans (2/3) 27', 46'; Drop: Evans 77'

Brentford Community Stadium
Attendance: 0
Referee: Nika Amashukeli (Georgia)

2 April 2021
21:00 CET

Montpellier (France)	26–21	(Scotland) Glasgow Warriors
Try: Guirado 38' c Bouthier 43' c Con: Lozowski (2/2) 40', 44'; Pen: Lozowski (4/6) 14', 24', 58', 71'	Report	Pen: Hastings (5/5) 1', 16', 27', 55', 62'; Thompson (2/2) 70', 73'

GGL Stadium
Attendance: 0
Referee: Karl Dickson (England)

3 April 2021
16:00 CET

Benetton (Italy)	29–16	(France) Agen
Try: Duvenage 20' m Ioane 45' m Brex 62' m Padovani 73' m Pen: Garbisi (3/3) 12', 29', 39'	Report	Try: Hayes 1' c Con: Verdu (1/1) 2'; Pen: Verdu (3/3) 18', 50', 55'

Stadio Comunale di Monigo
Attendance: 0
Referee: Christophe Ridley (England)

3 April 2021
15:00 BST

Ospreys (Wales)	24–28	(England) Newcastle Falcons
Try: K. Williams 8' c D. Evans 12' c Botha 70' c Con: Price (3/3) 9', 13', 71'; Pen: Price (1/1) 56'	Report	Try: Davison 33' c Penalty try 38'; Robinson 41' c McGuigan 64' m van der Walt 66' c Con: Connon (3/4) 34', 42', 67'

Liberty Stadium
Attendance: 0
Referee: Ludovic Cayre (France)

3 April 2021
17:30 BST

Dragons (Wales)	39–43	(England) Northampton Saints
Try: Hewitt (2) 11' c, 33' m Screech 26' c S. Davies 50' c Brown 60' c Con: S. Davies (4/5) 12', 26', 51', 60'; Pen: S. Davies (2/2) 6', 43'	Report	Try: Naiyaravoro (2) 36' c, 73' c Sleightholme 41' c Mitchell 54' c Harrison 62' m Collins 74' c Con: Grayson (5/6) 37', 41, 55', 73' 75'; Pen: Grayson (1/1) 24'

Rodney Parade
Attendance: 0
Referee: Alexandre Ruiz (France)

3 April 2021
20:00 BST

Leicester Tigers (England)	48–32	(Ireland) Connacht
Try: Clare (2) 11' m, 65' c Porter 14' c Moroni 27' m Henry 31' c Wells 73' c Wiese 78' c Con: Henry (2/4) 15', 32'; McPhillips (3/3) 66', 74', 79'; Pen: McPhillips (1/1) 57'	Report	Try: Marmion 6' m E. Masterson 43' c Wootton 56' c Boyle 71' c Con: Carty (2/3) 44', 59'; C. Fitzgerald (1/1) 71'; Pen: Carty (2/3) 23', 40+5'

Mattioli Woods Welford Road
Attendance: 0
Referee: Adam Jones (Wales) (Note: Replaces Pascal Gaüzère who was originally appointed to the fixture but changed to Jones on 26 March)

4 April 2021
20:00 BST

Harlequins (England)	21–57	(Ireland) Ulster
Try: Lawday 31' c Kenningham 64' c Els 77' c Con: Herron (3/3) 32', 64', 78'	Report	Try: McCloskey 7' c Herring (2) 21' c, 55' c Reidy (2) 26' c, 69' c Lowry 33' m Burns 59' c Mathewson 65' c Con: Cooney (5/6) 8', 23', 27', 57', 60'; Madigan (2/2) 66', 70'; Pen: Cooney (1/1) 12'

Twickenham Stoop
Attendance: 0
Referee: Romain Poite (France)

=== Quarter-finals ===
9 April 2021
20:00 BST

Bath (England)	26–13	(England) London Irish
Try: McNally 8' c Stuart (2) 23' c, 31' m Mercer 67' c Con: Spencer (3/4) 9', 24', 68'	Report	Try: Creevy 5' c Con: Jackson (1/1) 6'; Pen: Jackson (2/2) 40', 63'

Recreation Ground
Attendance: 0
Referee: Frank Murphy (Ireland)

10 April 2021
12:30 BST

Leicester Tigers (England)	39–15	(England) Newcastle Falcons
Try: Potter (2) 4' m, 80' c Penalty try (2) 13', 75'; Moroni 46' c Con: McPhillips (1/2) 47'; Ford (1/1) 80+1'; Pen: McPhillips (1/1) 17'; Ford (1/1) 56'	Report	Try: Wacokecoke 32' m Penny 48' c Con: Connon (1/2) 50'; Pen: Connon (1/1) 9'

Mattioli Woods Welford Road
Attendance: 0
Referee: Romain Poite (France)

10 April 2021
20:00 BST

Northampton Saints (England)	27–35	(Ireland) Ulster
Try: Mitchell 4' c Freeman (2) 32' m, 34' c Sleightholme 58' m Con: Francis (2/4) 6', 35'; Pen: Francis (1/1) 16'	Report	Try: Penalty try 11'; Herring 24' c M. Moore 46' c Cooney 61' c Stockdale 72' c Con: Cooney (4/4) 25', 47', 62', 73'

Franklin's Gardens
Attendance: 0
Referee: Alexandre Ruiz (France)

10 April 2021
21:00 CET

Montpellier (France)	31–25	(Italy) Benetton
Try: Paillaugue (2) 11' m, 54' c Willemse 36' c Con: Paillaugue (2/3) 37', 55'; Pen: Paillaugue (3/3) 4', 29', 60'; Drop: Bouthier 24'	Report	Try: Garbisi 45' c Con: Garbisi (1/1) 46'; Pen: Garbisi (5/6) 1', 6', 14', 27', 31'; Allan (1/1) 65'

GGL Stadium
Attendance: 0
Referee: Karl Dickson (England)

=== Semi-finals ===
The draw for the semi-finals took place on 11 April 2021 at BT Sport's studios in London.

30 April 2021
20:00 BST

Leicester Tigers (England)	33–24	(Ireland) Ulster
Try: Wiese 44' c Genge 52' c Porter 73' c Con: Ford (3/3) 44', 54', 75'; Pen: Ford (3/4) 6', 19', 49'; Drop: Ford 58'	Report	Try: Henderson 15' c Burns 21' c Timoney 67' c Con: Cooney (2/2) 16', 22'; Lowry (1/1) 68'; Pen: Cooney (1/1) 9'

Mattioli Woods Welford Road
Attendance: 0
Referee: Pascal Gaüzère (France)

1 May 2021
20:00 BST

Bath (England)	10–19	(France) Montpellier
Try: Dunn 2' c Con: B. Spencer (1/1) 3'; Pen: B. Spencer (1/2) 26'	Report	Try: Camara 22' c Con: Paillaugue (1/1) 23'; Pen: Paillaugue (3/5) 19', 31', 36'; Pollard (1/1) 79'

Recreation Ground
Attendance: 0
Referee: Andrew Brace (Ireland)

=== Final ===
21 May 2021
20:00

Leicester Tigers (England)	17–18	(France) Montpellier
Try: Wells 32' c Wiese 46' c Con: Ford (2/2) 34', 47'; Pen: Ford (1/2) 8'	Report	Try: Rattez 13' c Goosen 57' m Con: Paillaugue (1/2) 14'; Pen: Paillaugue (2/3) 16', 50'

Twickenham Stadium
Attendance: 10,000 (Note: Capacity limited to 10,000 due to national restrictions surrounding the COVID-19 pandemic.)
Referee: Andrew Brace (Ireland)

FB	15	(England) Freddie Steward
RW	14	(England) Guy Porter	(substituted off) 19'
OC	13	(Argentina) Matías Moroni
IC	12	(England) Dan Kelly
LW	11	(Fiji) Nemani Nadolo	(substituted off) 68'
FH	10	(England) George Ford
SH	9	(England) Richard Wigglesworth	(substituted off) 45'
N8	8	(South Africa) Jasper Wiese
OF	7	(South Africa) Cyle Brink	(substituted off) 29'
BF	6	(South Africa) Hanro Liebenberg
RL	5	(England) Calum Green	(substituted off) 77'
LL	4	(England) Harry Wells	(substituted off) 60'
TP	3	(England) Dan Cole	(substituted off) 52'
HK	2	(England) Tom Youngs (c)	(substituted off) 52'
LP	1	(England) Ellis Genge	(substituted off) 65'
Substitutions:
HK	16	(England) Charlie Clare	(substituted on) 52'
PR	17	(South Africa) Luan de Bruin	(substituted on) 65'
PR	18	(England) Joe Heyes	(substituted on) 52'
LK	19	(Scotland) Cameron Henderson	(substituted on) 77'
FL	20	(Wales) Tommy Reffell	(substituted on) 29'
SH	21	(England) Ben Youngs	(substituted on) 45'
FH	22	(England) Zack Henry	(substituted on) 68'
WG	23	(Fiji) Kini Murimurivalu	(substituted on) 19'
Coach:
(England) Steve Borthwick

FB	15	(France) Anthony Bouthier
RW	14	(France) Arthur Vincent		(substituted off) 43'
OC	13	(South Africa) Johan Goosen
IC	12	(South Africa) Jan Serfontein		(substituted off) 63'
LW	11	(France) Vincent Rattez
FH	10	(England) Alex Lozowski
SH	9	(France) Benoît Paillaugue		(substituted off) 62'
N8	8	(France) Alexandre Bécognée	(yellow card) 29' to 40'	(substituted off) 52'	(substituted on) 55'
OF	7	(France) Yacouba Camara
BF	6	(France) Fulgence Ouedraogo		(substituted off) 25'
RL	5	(France) Paul Willemse		(substituted off) 77'
LL	4	(France) Florian Verhaeghe		(substituted off) 67'
TP	3	(France) Mohamed Haouas		(substituted off) 65'
HK	2	(France) Guilhem Guirado (c)	(yellow card) 44' to 54'			(substituted off) 65'
LP	1	(France) Enzo Forletta
Substitutions:
HK	16	(South Africa) Bismarck du Plessis		(substituted on) 52'	(substituted off) 55'	(substituted on) 65'
PR	17	(South Africa) Robert Rodgers
PR	18	(United States) Titi Lamositele		(substituted on) 65'
LK	19	(Canada) Tyler Duguid		(substituted on) 77'
FL	20	(South Africa) Jacques du Plessis		(substituted on) 25'
SH	21	(South Africa) Cobus Reinach		(substituted on) 62'
FH	22	(South Africa) Handré Pollard		(substituted on) 63'
CE	23	(France) Gabriel N'Gandebe		(substituted on) 43'
Coach:
(France) Philippe Saint-André

== See also ==
- 2020–21 European Rugby Champions Cup
