= Sam Jeffries =

Sam Jeffries may refer to:

- Sam Jeffries (rugby union, born 1992), Australian rugby union player
- Sam Jeffries (rugby union, born 1993), English international rugby union player
