= Chunya Munga =

English rugby union player

- Born: 2 September 2000 (age 26) Reading, Berkshire, England
- Height: 2.01 m (6 ft 7 in)
- Weight: 120 kg (265 lb)
- School: Leighton Park School

Rugby union career
- Position: Lock
Senior career
Years	Team	Apps	(Points)
2016–2023	London Irish	53	(10)
2019	→ Hartpury University (loan)	2	(5)
2023–	Northampton Saints	41	(15)
- Correct as of 3 January 2026
International career
Years	Team	Apps	(Points)
2018	England U18s	3	(0)
2020	England U20s	1	(0)
- Correct as of 21 February 2020

Chunya Munga (born 2 September 2000) is an English professional rugby union player who plays as a lock for Premiership Rugby club Northampton Saints.

== Early life ==
Born in Reading, Berkshire, Munga started playing rugby union at ten years-old at his local club Reading Abbey. He attended Leighton Park School where he served as Head Boy.

== Club career ==
Munga joined the London Irish Academy at the age of 14 years-old, having been a supporter of the club growing up.

=== Hartpury University ===
In 2019, Munga played on loan at RFU Championship side Hartpury, scoring a try on debut against Doncaster Knights in October 2019.

=== London Irish ===
Munga made his London Irish debut during the 2019-20 season against Bristol Bears in the Premiership Rugby Cup. He made his league debut in the Premiership later that season against Saracens.

Munga had made 18 senior club appearances for London Irish prior to signing a new contract with the club in 2021. In May 2022 he started for the side that lost to Worcester Warriors in the final of the 2021–22 Premiership Rugby Cup. He was up to 45 appearances by the time of another new contract in January 2023.

In March 2023 Munga made his fiftieth appearance for the club and that same month started in the 2022–23 Premiership Rugby Cup final which saw them lose to Exeter Chiefs after extra time. In June 2023, London Irish went into administration, he had made 53 league appearances for London Irish before they liquidated.

=== Northampton Saints ===
Munga became the first former London Irish player to find a new club when he signed for Northampton Saints in June 2023.

== International career ==
Munga represented England under-18 and made a solitary appearance for the England under-20 side in a defeat against Ireland during the 2020 Six Nations Under 20s Championship.

In June 2021 Munga was called up by head coach Eddie Jones to train with the senior England squad.
