= 2022 England rugby union tour of Australia =

- Coach: Eddie Jones
- Tour captain: Courtney Lawes
- Top test point scorer: Owen Farrell (44)
- Top test try scorer: 6 players (1) (Note: Henry Arundell, Ellis Genge, Marcus Smith, Freddie Steward, Jack van Poortvliet and Billy Vunipola are all tied on one try scored each.)
Summary
P	W	D	L
Total
3	2	0	1
Test match
3	2	0	1
Opponent
P	W	D	L
Australia
3	2	0	1

Tour chronology
- ← South Africa 2018 New Zealand 2024 →

In July 2022, England played a three-test series against Australia as part of the 2022 mid-year rugby union tests. They played the Wallabies at three locations across Australia within as many weeks, with the overall winner receiving the Ella–Mobbs Trophy.

Coming into the series, England were ranked in fifth place in the World Rugby Rankings, while Australia sat one place below in sixth. The two nations had most recently contested a test series in 2016, which England won for the first time, with a historic 3–0 "whitewash" on Australian soil.

The 2016 series marked the start of England's eight-match winning streak against Australia, whose most recent victory in the fixture was in the 2015 Rugby World Cup pool stage. However, the first test of the 2022 tour on 2 July ended that streak, as Australia claimed a 30–28 victory in Perth. The following week, on 9 July, England leveled the series with a 25–17 win in Brisbane. In the deciding test on 16 July, England clinched the series, triumphing over Australia by 21–17 in Sydney.

== Fixtures ==
Date	Venue	Home	Score	Away
2 July 2022	Optus Stadium, Perth	Australia	30–28	England
9 July 2022	Suncorp Stadium, Brisbane	Australia	17–25	England
16 July 2022	Sydney Cricket Ground, Sydney	Australia	17–21	England

== Squads ==
Note: Ages, caps and clubs are as of 2 July 2022, the first test match of the tour.

=== England ===
On 20 June 2022, England head coach Eddie Jones named a 36-man squad for the summer test series against Australia.

On 30 June 2022, Charlie Ewels withdrew from the tour due to a knee injury sustained in training. He was replaced in the squad by Sam Jeffries.

On 4 July 2022 Tom Curry withdrew from the tour due to a concussion sustained in the first test.

On 11 July 2022 Maro Itoje and Sam Underhill withdrew from the squad following concussions sustained in the second test.

Coaching team:

- Head coach: (Australia) Eddie Jones
- Defence coach: (Australia) Anthony Seibold
- Attack coach: (England) Martin Gleeson
- Forwards coach: (England) Richard Cockerill
- Scrum coach: (Scotland) Matt Proudfoot

Player	Position	Date of birth (age)	Caps	Club/province
Luke Cowan-Dickie	Hooker	20 June 1993 (aged 29)	34	Exeter Chiefs
Jamie George	Hooker	20 October 1990 (aged 31)	66	Saracens
Jack Walker	Hooker	6 May 1996 (aged 26)	0	Harlequins
Ellis Genge	Prop	16 February 1995 (aged 27)	36	Bristol Bears
Joe Heyes	Prop	13 April 1999 (aged 23)	2	Leicester Tigers
Bevan Rodd	Prop	26 August 2000 (aged 21)	2	Sale Sharks
Patrick Schickerling	Prop	16 October 1998 (aged 23)	0	Exeter Chiefs
Will Stuart	Prop	12 July 1996 (aged 25)	20	Bath
Mako Vunipola	Prop	14 January 1991 (aged 31)	67	Saracens
Ollie Chessum	Lock	6 September 2000 (aged 21)	2	Leicester Tigers
Jonny Hill	Lock	8 June 1994 (aged 28)	12	Sale Sharks
Nick Isiekwe	Lock	20 April 1998 (aged 24)	6	Saracens
Maro Itoje	Lock	28 October 1994 (aged 27)	56	Saracens
Courtney Lawes	Lock	23 February 1989 (aged 33)	93	Northampton Saints
Sam Jeffries	Back row	1 April 1993 (aged 29)	0	Bristol Bears
Tom Curry	Back row	15 June 1998 (aged 24)	40	Sale Sharks
Lewis Ludlam	Back row	8 December 1995 (aged 26)	11	Northampton Saints
Sam Underhill	Back row	22 July 1996 (aged 25)	28	Bath
Billy Vunipola	Back row	3 November 1992 (aged 29)	61	Saracens
Jack Willis	Back row	24 December 1996 (aged 25)	3	Wasps
Danny Care	Scrum-half	2 January 1987 (aged 35)	84	Harlequins
Harry Randall	Scrum-half	18 December 1997 (aged 24)	6	Bristol Bears
Jack van Poortvliet	Scrum-half	15 May 2001 (aged 21)	0	Leicester Tigers
Owen Farrell	Fly-half	24 September 1991 (aged 30)	94	Saracens
Marcus Smith	Fly-half	14 February 1999 (aged 23)	10	Harlequins
Fraser Dingwall	Centre	7 April 1999 (aged 23)	0	Northampton Saints
William Joseph	Centre	15 July 2002 (aged 19)	0	London Irish
Joe Marchant	Centre	16 July 1996 (aged 25)	12	Harlequins
Guy Porter	Centre	23 January 1997 (aged 25)	0	Leicester Tigers
Henry Arundell	Wing	8 November 2002 (aged 19)	0	London Irish
Joe Cokanasiga	Wing	15 November 1997 (aged 24)	11	Bath
Jonny May	Wing	1 April 1990 (aged 32)	69	Gloucester
Jack Nowell	Wing	11 April 1993 (aged 29)	39	Exeter Chiefs
Tommy Freeman	Fullback	5 March 2001 (aged 21)	0	Northampton Saints
George Furbank	Fullback	17 October 1996 (aged 25)	5	Northampton Saints
Freddie Steward	Fullback	5 December 2000 (aged 21)	10	Leicester Tigers

=== Australia ===
On 12 June 2022, Australia head coach Dave Rennie named a 35-man squad for the summer test series against England.

On 20 June 2022, Harry Johnson-Holmes joined up with the squad from the Australia A team, as injury cover for Taniela Tupou. However, he later withdrew due to injury, and was replaced by Sam Talakai.

On 24 June 2022, Ned Hanigan also joined up with the squad, as injury cover for Jed Holloway.

On 5 July 2022, Reece Hodge was called up to the squad from the Australia A team, as an injury replacement for Tom Banks.

Coaching team:

- Head coach: (New Zealand) Dave Rennie
- Defence coach: (Scotland) Matt Taylor
- Attack coach: (Australia) Scott Wisemantel
- Forwards coach: (Australia) Dan McKellar
- Scrum coach: (South Africa) Petrus du Plessis

Player	Position	Date of birth (age)	Caps	Club/province
Folau Fainga'a	Hooker	5 May 1995 (aged 27)	25	(Australia) Brumbies
Lachlan Lonergan	Hooker	11 October 1999 (aged 22)	4	(Australia) Brumbies
Dave Porecki	Hooker	23 October 1992 (aged 29)	0	(Australia) Waratahs
Allan Alaalatoa	Prop	28 January 1994 (aged 28)	53	(Australia) Brumbies
Angus Bell	Prop	10 April 2000 (aged 22)	16	(Australia) Waratahs
Pone Fa'amausili	Prop	26 February 1997 (aged 25)	0	(Australia) Rebels
Scott Sio	Prop	16 October 1991 (aged 30)	69	(Australia) Brumbies
James Slipper	Prop	6 June 1989 (aged 33)	114	(Australia) Brumbies
Sam Talakai	Prop	4 September 1991 (aged 30)	0	(Japan) Tokyo Sungoliath
Taniela Tupou	Prop	10 May 1996 (aged 26)	38	(Australia) Reds
Nick Frost	Lock	10 October 1999 (aged 22)	0	(Australia) Brumbies
Ned Hanigan	Lock	11 April 1995 (aged 27)	25	(Australia) Waratahs
Jed Holloway	Lock	2 November 1992 (aged 29)	0	(Australia) Waratahs
Cadeyrn Neville	Lock	9 November 1988 (aged 33)	0	(Australia) Brumbies
Matt Philip	Lock	7 March 1994 (aged 28)	20	(Australia) Rebels
Darcy Swain	Lock	5 July 1997 (aged 24)	10	(Australia) Brumbies
Michael Hooper	Back row	29 October 1991 (aged 30)	118	(Australia) Waratahs
Rob Leota	Back row	3 March 1997 (aged 25)	6	(Australia) Rebels
Pete Samu	Back row	17 December 1991 (aged 30)	19	(Australia) Brumbies
Rob Valetini	Back row	3 September 1998 (aged 23)	18	(Australia) Brumbies
Harry Wilson	Back row	22 November 1999 (aged 22)	10	(Australia) Reds
Jake Gordon	Scrum-half	7 June 1993 (aged 29)	10	(Australia) Waratahs
Tate McDermott	Scrum-half	18 September 1998 (aged 23)	15	(Australia) Reds
Nic White	Scrum-half	13 June 1990 (aged 32)	47	(Australia) Brumbies
Quade Cooper	Fly-half	5 April 1988 (aged 34)	75	(Japan) Kintetsu Liners
Noah Lolesio	Fly-half	18 December 1999 (aged 22)	9	(Australia) Brumbies
James O'Connor	Fly-half	5 July 1990 (aged 31)	61	(Australia) Reds
Len Ikitau	Centre	1 October 1998 (aged 23)	13	(Australia) Brumbies
Samu Kerevi	Centre	27 September 1993 (aged 28)	38	(Japan) Tokyo Sungoliath
Hunter Paisami	Centre	10 April 1998 (aged 24)	15	(Australia) Reds
Jordan Petaia	Centre	14 March 2000 (aged 22)	16	(Australia) Reds
Andrew Kellaway	Wing	12 October 1995 (aged 26)	13	(Australia) Rebels
Marika Koroibete	Wing	26 July 1992 (aged 29)	42	(Japan) Saitama Wild Knights
Izaia Perese	Wing	17 May 1997 (aged 25)	2	(Australia) Waratahs
Suliasi Vunivalu	Wing	27 November 1995 (aged 26)	0	(Australia) Reds
Tom Wright	Wing	21 July 1997 (aged 24)	10	(Australia) Brumbies
Reece Hodge	Fullback	26 August 1994 (aged 27)	54	(Australia) Rebels

== Matches ==
=== First test ===
2 July 2022
17:55 AWST (UTC+8)

Australia	30–28	England
Try: Petaia 63 'c Fainga'a 69 'c Samu 76 'c Con: Lolesio (3/3) 64', 70', 77'; Pen: Lolesio (3/3) 23', 40', 43'	Report	Try: Genge 49' m Arundell 79 'c van Poortvliet 80+2 'c Con: Farrell (2/3) 79', 80+3'; Pen: Farrell (3/4) 7', 21', 60'

Perth Stadium, Perth
Attendance: 47,668
Referee: James Doleman (New Zealand)

Team details

FB	15	Tom Banks		(substituted off) 21'
RW	14	Andrew Kellaway
OC	13	Len Ikitau
IC	12	Samu Kerevi
LW	11	Marika Koroibete		(substituted off) 78'
FH	10	Noah Lolesio	(yellow card) 80' to end'
SH	9	Nic White		(substituted off) 74'
N8	8	Rob Valetini		(substituted off) 67'
BF	7	Michael Hooper (c)
OF	6	Rob Leota		(substituted off) 53'
RL	5	Caderyn Neville
LL	4	Darcy Swain	(red card) 34'
TP	3	Allan Alaalatoa		(substituted off) 25'
HK	2	Dave Porecki		(substituted off) 65'
LP	1	Angus Bell		(substituted off) 53'
Replacements:
HK	16	Folau Fainga'a		(substituted on) 65'
PR	17	Scott Sio		(substituted on) 53'
PR	18	James Slipper		(substituted on) 25'
LK	19	Matt Philip		(substituted on) 53'
FL	20	Pete Samu		(substituted on) 67'
SH	21	Jake Gordon		(substituted on) 74'
FH	22	James O'Connor		(substituted on) 78'
WG	23	Jordan Petaia		(substituted on) 21'
Coach:
(New Zealand) Dave Rennie

FB	15	Freddie Steward
RW	14	Jack Nowell
OC	13	Joe Marchant
IC	12	Owen Farrell
LW	11	Joe Cokanasiga		(substituted off) 73'
FH	10	Marcus Smith
SH	9	Danny Care		(substituted off) 78'
N8	8	Billy Vunipola	(yellow card) 66' to 76'
BF	7	Tom Curry		(substituted off) 40'
OF	6	Courtney Lawes (c)
RL	5	Jonny Hill	(yellow card) 34' to 44'	(substituted off) 68'
LL	4	Maro Itoje
TP	3	Will Stuart		(substituted off) 78'
HK	2	Jamie George		(substituted off) 65'
LP	1	Ellis Genge		(substituted off) 57'
Replacements:
HK	16	Luke Cowan-Dickie		(substituted on) 65'
PR	17	Mako Vunipola		(substituted on) 57'
PR	18	Joe Heyes		(substituted on) 78'
LK	19	Ollie Chessum		(substituted on) 68'
FL	20	Lewis Ludlam		(substituted on) 40'
SH	21	Jack van Poortvliet		(substituted on) 78'
CE	22	Guy Porter
FB	23	Henry Arundell		(substituted on) 73'
Coach:
(Australia) Eddie Jones

Player of the Match:
Samu Kerevi (Australia)

Assistant referees:
Andrew Brace (Ireland)
Craig Evans (Wales)
Television match official:
Brendon Pickerill (New Zealand)

Notes:

- Quade Cooper (Australia) had been named in the starting line-up, but pulled up injured in the warm-up. He was substituted by Noah Lolesio, who in turn was replaced on the bench by James O'Connor.
- Caderyn Neville and Dave Porecki (both Australia) and Henry Arundell and Jack van Poortvliet (both England) made their international debuts.
- This was Australia's first win over England in nine games.

=== Second test ===
9 July 2022
19:55 AEST (UTC+10)

Australia	17–25	England
Try: Tupou 37' c Kerevi 48' c Con: Lolesio (2/2) 38', 49'; Pen: Lolesio (1/1) 54'	Report	Try: B. Vunipola 5' c Con: Farrell (1/1) 6'; Pen: Farrell (6/7) 11', 15', 23', 33', 44', 67'

Suncorp Stadium, Brisbane
Attendance: 46,536
Referee: Andrew Brace (Ireland)

Team details

FB	15	Jordan Petaia	(substituted off) 4'
RW	14	Tom Wright
OC	13	Hunter Paisami
IC	12	Samu Kerevi
LW	11	Marika Koroibete
FH	10	Noah Lolesio
SH	9	Nic White	(substituted off) 68'
N8	8	Rob Valetini
BF	7	Michael Hooper (c)
OF	6	Rob Leota	(substituted off) 68'
RL	5	Caderyn Neville	(substituted off) 57'
LL	4	Matt Philip
TP	3	Taniela Tupou	(substituted off) 50'
HK	2	Dave Porecki	(substituted off) 55'
LP	1	Angus Bell	(substituted off) 50'	(substituted on) 52'
Replacements:
HK	16	Folau Fainga'a	(substituted on) 55'
PR	17	Scott Sio	(substituted on) 50'	(substituted off) 52'
PR	18	James Slipper	(substituted on) 50'
LK	19	Nick Frost	(substituted on) 57'
FL	20	Pete Samu	(substituted on) 68'
SH	21	Jake Gordon	(substituted on) 68'
FH	22	James O'Connor		(substituted on) 41'
WG	23	Izaia Perese (yellow card) 22' to 32'	(substituted on) 4'	(substituted off) 41'
Coach:
(New Zealand) Dave Rennie

FB	15	Freddie Steward
RW	14	Jack Nowell
OC	13	Guy Porter	(substituted off) 79'
IC	12	Owen Farrell
LW	11	Tommy Freeman	(substituted off) 70'
FH	10	Marcus Smith (yellow card) 53' to 63'
SH	9	Jack van Poortvliet	(substituted off) 63'
N8	8	Billy Vunipola
BF	7	Sam Underhill	(substituted off) 58'
OF	6	Courtney Lawes (c)
RL	5	Jonny Hill
LL	4	Maro Itoje	(substituted off) 40'
TP	3	Will Stuart	(substituted off) 60'
HK	2	Jamie George	(substituted off) 55'
LP	1	Ellis Genge	(substituted off) 55'
Replacements:
HK	16	Luke Cowan-Dickie	(substituted on) 55'
PR	17	Mako Vunipola	(substituted on) 55'
PR	18	Joe Heyes	(substituted on) 60'
LK	19	Ollie Chessum	(substituted on) 40'
FL	20	Lewis Ludlam	(substituted on) 58'
SH	21	Danny Care	(substituted on) 63'
CE	22	Will Joseph	(substituted on) 79'
WG	23	Henry Arundell	(substituted on) 70'
Coach:
(Australia) Eddie Jones

Player of the Match:
Billy Vunipola (England)

Assistant referees:
Paul Williams (New Zealand)
Craig Evans (Wales)
Television match official:
Joy Neville (Ireland)

Notes:

- Jack Willis (England) was originally named among the substitutes, but pulled out prior to the match due to a rib injury. He was replaced on the bench by Will Joseph.
- Nick Frost (Australia) and Tommy Freeman, Guy Porter and Will Joseph (all England) made their international debuts.

=== Third test ===
16 July 2022
19:55 AEST (UTC+10)

Australia	17–21	England
Try: Wright 23' c Fainga'a 65' c Con: Lolesio (2/2) 25', 66'; Pen: Lolesio (1/2) 30'	Report	Try: Steward 40' m Smith 54' c Con: Farrell (1/2) 55'; Pen: Farrell (3/4) 17', 33', 49'

Sydney Cricket Ground, Sydney
Attendance: 43,274
Referee: Paul Williams (New Zealand)

Team details

FB	15	Reece Hodge	(substituted off) 76'
RW	14	Tom Wright
OC	13	Hunter Paisami	(substituted off) 67'
IC	12	Samu Kerevi
LW	11	Marika Koroibete
FH	10	Noah Lolesio
SH	9	Nic White	(substituted off) 59'
N8	8	Rob Valetini	(substituted off) 72'
BF	7	Michael Hooper (c)
OF	6	Harry Wilson	(substituted off) 55'
RL	5	Matt Philip
LL	4	Nick Frost
TP	3	Taniela Tupou	(substituted off) 50'
HK	2	Dave Porecki	(substituted off) 55'
LP	1	James Slipper	(substituted off) 50'	(substituted on) 67'
Replacements:
HK	16	Folau Fainga'a	(substituted on) 55'
PR	17	Angus Bell	(substituted on) 50'	(substituted off) 67'
PR	18	Allan Alaalatoa	(substituted on) 50'
FL	19	Rob Leota	(substituted on) 72'
FL	20	Pete Samu	(substituted on) 55'
SH	21	Tate McDermott	(substituted on) 59'
CE	22	Len Ikitau	(substituted on) 67'
WG	23	Suliasi Vunivalu	(substituted on) 76'
Coach:
(New Zealand) Dave Rennie

FB	15	Freddie Steward
RW	14	Jack Nowell
OC	13	Guy Porter
IC	12	Owen Farrell
LW	11	Tommy Freeman	(substituted off) 69'
FH	10	Marcus Smith
SH	9	Danny Care	(substituted off) 36'
N8	8	Billy Vunipola
BF	7	Lewis Ludlam	(substituted off) 66'
OF	6	Courtney Lawes (c)
RL	5	Jonny Hill
LL	4	Ollie Chessum	(substituted off) 66'
TP	3	Will Stuart	(substituted off) 60'
HK	2	Jamie George	(substituted off) 45'
LP	1	Ellis Genge	(substituted off) 55'
Replacements:
HK	16	Luke Cowan-Dickie	(substituted on) 45'
PR	17	Mako Vunipola	(substituted on) 55'
PR	18	Joe Heyes	(substituted on) 60'
LK	19	Nick Isiekwe	(substituted on) 66'
FL	20	Jack Willis	(substituted on) 66'
SH	21	Jack van Poortvliet	(substituted on) 36'
CE	22	Will Joseph
WG	23	Henry Arundell	(substituted on) 69'
Coach:
(Australia) Eddie Jones

Player of the Match:
Freddie Steward (England)

Assistant referees:
Andrew Brace (Ireland)
James Doleman (New Zealand)
Television match official:
Chris Hart (New Zealand)

Notes:

- Nic White (Australia) earned his 50th test cap.
- Suliasi Vunivalu (Australia) made his international debut.
- This was the first rugby union test match held at the Sydney Cricket Ground since Australia hosted Argentina in 1986.
- England won the Ella–Mobbs Trophy (previously the Cook Cup) for the first time.

== See also ==
- 2022 mid-year rugby union tests
- History of rugby union matches between Australia and England
