= Will Joseph (rugby union, born 2002) =

England international rugby union player

- Born: William Joseph; 15 July 2002 (age 24) Derby, England
- Height: 1.83 m (6 ft 0 in)
- Weight: 101 kg (15 st 13 lb; 223 lb)
- School: Millfield
- Notable relative: Jonathan Joseph Hannah Joseph

Rugby union career
- Position: Centre
- Current team: Gloucester Rugby
Senior career
Years	Team	Apps	(Points)
2021–2023	London Irish	30	(25)
2023–2025	Harlequins	22	(55)
2025–	Gloucester	21	(40)
- Correct as of 21 November 2026
International career
Years	Team	Apps	(Points)
2019	England U18	3	(5)
2022	England U20	2	(0)
2022–	England	3	(25)
- Correct as of 21 November 2026

William Joseph (born 15 July 2002) is an English professional rugby union player who plays as a centre for Premiership Rugby club Gloucester. He made his international debut for England in July 2022.

He is the younger brother of former England international Jonathan Joseph.

== Career ==
Joseph was educated at Millfield. At the age of thirteen he joined the academy of London Irish and made his club debut in 2021. He scored a try in the semi-final of the 2021–22 Premiership Rugby Cup against Leicester Tigers and then started in the final as they finished runners up to Worcester Warriors.

Joseph played for the England under-18 team. He represented the England under-20 team during the 2022 Six Nations Under 20s Championship.

In May 2022 Joseph received his first call-up to the senior England squad by coach Eddie Jones for their tour of Australia. On 9 July 2022 he made his senior debut for England as a late substitute during their second test victory at Lang Park. He was an unused substitute for the final game as they beat Australia at Sydney Cricket Ground to win the series.

In May 2023, Joseph initially made Steve Borthwick's 38 man World Cup training squad ahead of the 2023 Rugby World Cup to be contested in France. He was ultimately cut from the squad the following month, alongside Beno Obano as Borthwick shrunk his squad to 36 players.

In June 2023, following the collapse of his domestic club London Irish, Joseph signed for Harlequins. He made his debut in the Premiership Cup against Gloucester Rugby scoring a try in the 39th minute.

In February 2025, it was announced that Joseph would join Premiership rivals Gloucester ahead of the 2025-26 season.

In November 2026, Joseph won his second cap for England during the 5th round of the World Rugby Nations Championship against Japan. He scored 5 tries in the game. On 21 November, Joseph was also in the starting line-up for England against New Zealand in the World Rugby Nations Championship, his third cap.

=== List of international tries ===
No.	Date	Venue	Opponent	Score	Result	Competition
1	14 November 2026	Twickenham Stadium, London, England	Japan		78–15	2026 Nations Championship
2	14 November 2026	Twickenham Stadium, London, England	Japan		78–15	2026 Nations Championship
3	14 November 2026	Twickenham Stadium, London, England	Japan		78–15	2026 Nations Championship
4	14 November 2026	Twickenham Stadium, London, England	Japan		78–15	2026 Nations Championship
5	14 November 2026	Twickenham Stadium, London, England	Japan		78–15	2026 Nations Championship

as of 21 November 2026
