= Colby, Norfolk =

Village and civil parish in Norfolk, England

Coordinates: 52.83598°N 1.29883°E

Colby
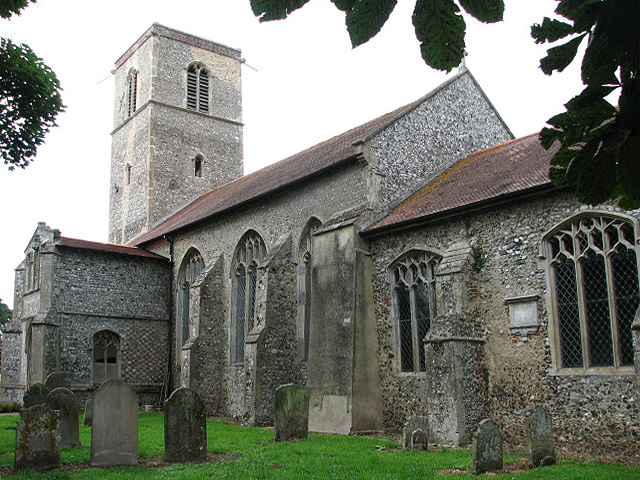
- St. Giles' Church

- Location within Norfolk
- Area: 8.34 km^{2} (3.22 sq mi)
- Population: 492 (2021 census)
  - Density: 59/km^{2} (150/sq mi)
- OS grid reference: TG222316
  - London: 131 miles (211 km)
- Civil parish: Colby CP
- District: North Norfolk
- Shire county: Norfolk
- Region: East
- Country: England
- Sovereign state: United Kingdom
- Post town: NORWICH
- Postcode district: NR11
- Dialling code: 01263
- Police: Norfolk
- Fire: Norfolk
- Ambulance: East of England
- UK Parliament: North Norfolk

Colby is a village and a civil parish in the English county of Norfolk.

Colby is located 3.8 miles (6.1 km) west of North Walsham and 15 miles (24 km) north of Norwich.

== History ==
Colby's name is of Viking origin and derives from the Old Norse for either Kolli's farm settlement or a hill farm settlement.

In the Domesday Book, Colby is recorded as a settlement of 21 households in the hundred of South Erpingham. In 1086, the village formed part of the East Anglian estates of King William I.

During the Second World War, searchlight batteries and an anti-aircraft emplacement were built near Colby.

== Geography ==
According to the 2021 census, Colby has a population of 492 people which shows a minor decrease from the 494 people recorded in the 2011 census.

== St. Giles' Church ==
Colby's parish church is dedicated to Saint Giles and dates from around 1300. St. Giles' is located on Long Lane and has been Grade II listed since 1960.

St. Giles' was significantly extended in the Thirteenth and Fifteenth Centuries and subsequently in the Victorian era. The font dates from the Fifteenth Century with a Victorian top and close to the font was where a finger of St. Giles was held as a relic before the English Reformation.

== Notable residents ==
- Jack van Poortvliet- (b.2001) Leicester Tigers and England rugby union player, born in Colby.

== Governance ==
Colby is part of the electoral ward of Erpingham for local elections and is part of the district of North Norfolk.

The village's national constituency is North Norfolk, which has been represented by the Liberal Democrat Steff Aquarone MP since 2024.

== War memorial ==
Colby's war memorial is a set of stone plaques inside the south porch of St. Giles' Church. It lists the following names for the First World War:

Rank	Name	Unit	Date of death	Burial
2Lt.	Reginald A. Sarsby	10th Bn., Norfolk Regiment	22 Dec. 1915	Guards Cemetery
Pnr.	Charles H. Lee	Royal Engineers	14 Nov. 1918	St. Giles' Churchyard
Pte.	Stanley A. Jordan	15th Bn., Cheshire Regiment	27 Mar. 1918	Pozières Memorial
Pte.	D'Arcy W. W. Hardingham	13th Bn., East Surrey Regiment	28 Sep. 1918	St. Giles' Churchyard
Pte.	Frederick Doughty	Hertfordshire Regiment	31 Jul. 1917	Menin Gate
Pte.	Stanley H. Rouse	2nd (City) Bn., London Regiment	3 Apr. 1918	Chauny Cemetery
Pte.	William E. Daniels	2/6th Bn., Norfolk Regiment	20 Mar. 1915	St. Giles' Churchyard
Pte.	Frederick J. Matthews	7th Bn., Norfolk Regt.	13 Oct. 1915	Loos Memorial
Pte.	Cecil H. Burdett	8th Bn., Norfolk Regt.	23 Jul. 1916	La Neuville Cemetery
Pte.	Bertie H. Lowne	8th Bn., Norfolk Regt.	11 Aug. 1917	Menin Gate
Pte.	Alfred E. Turner	9th Bn., Norfolk Regt.	21 Sep. 1916	Grove Town Cemetery
Pte.	Arthur W. Cooper	7th Bn., Suffolk Regiment	27 Mar. 1918	Pozières Memorial

And, the following from the Second World War:

Rank	Name	Unit	Date of death	Burial
Cpl.	Edward L. Hall	5th Bn., Royal Norfolk Regiment	23 Oct. 1943	Chungkai War Cemetery
Pte.	Sidney Hudson	2nd Bn., Lincolnshire Regiment	8 Jul. 1944	Ranville War Cemetery
