= Ted Hill (rugby union) =

England international rugby union player

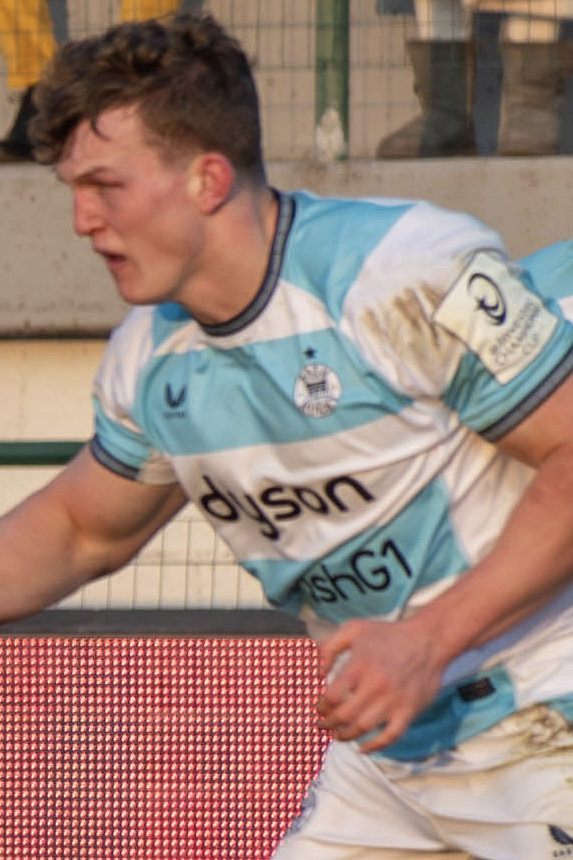
- Hill in 2024
- Full name: Edward Hill
- Born: 26 March 1999 (age 27) Worcester, England
- Height: 1.96 m (6 ft 5 in)
- Weight: 112 kg (17 st 9 lb; 247 lb)
- School: River School; Worcester Sixth Form College

Rugby union career
- Position(s): Back row, Second row
Youth career
- Malvern
Senior career
Years	Team	Apps	(Points)
2017–2022	Worcester Warriors	93	(100)
2022–	Bath	71	(85)
- Correct as of 1 May 2026
International career
Years	Team	Apps	(Points)
2016–2017	England U18	5	(5)
2017–2019	England U20	16	(10)
2018–	England	5	(0)
- Correct as of 19 July 2025

Edward Hill (born 26 March 1999) is an English professional rugby union player who plays as a flanker for Bath.

== Club career ==
=== Worcester ===
Hill started playing rugby as a child at Malvern RFC prior to joining the Worcester Warriors academy. In November 2017 he made his club debut against Sale Sharks in the Anglo-Welsh Cup. He made his league debut at the start of the 2018–19 Premiership season coming off the bench to score two tries including the winner against Leicester Tigers at Welford Road. On 3 November 2018, an article on BBC Sport's website, illustrated the meteoric rise of Hill, mentioning "(Hill's) four tries in his last five appearances for Worcester".

In June 2020, Hill signed a contract extension which would see him remain at Worcester until 2024 and the following month he was confirmed as club captain. He captained Worcester in the 2021–22 Premiership Rugby Cup final which saw them defeat London Irish after extra time to win the only top-flight trophy in their history.

In October 2022, Hill had his contracted terminated by the club, alongside the rest of his teammates after WRFC Players Limited, the company that owns Worcester Warriors RFC, were liquidated following a winding up petition. When speaking on the matter, Hill was quoted as saying, "There will be nothing written for the people who put us in this situation but to the governing bodies of rugby, something needs to change so that this doesn’t happen to any club again."

=== Bath ===
After joining Bath on loan only days before his Worcester contract was terminated, it was later announced in October 2022 Hill had joined the club on a permanent basis.

Having made himself an integral part of the Bath first XV during the 2022-23 season, he began the next season with a serious part of which was blighted by a serious leg injury which meant he didn’t play again until the new year. Upon his return, he showed no loss of form, and helped see Bath to the Premiership Final against Northampton Saints which Bath narrowly lost despite playing with fourteen men for much of the match.

Hill started in the 2024–25 EPCR Challenge Cup final as Bath beat Lyon at the Millennium Stadium to win their first European trophy for seventeen years. The following month, he started in the 2025 Premiership final which saw Bath beat Leicester Tigers to become champions of England for the first time since 1996.

== International career ==
Hill represented England under-16 and in March 2017 scored a try for the England under-18 side against France. He made his debut for the England under-20 team against Italy during the 2017 Six Nations Under 20s Championship and the following year started in the final of the 2018 World Rugby Under 20 Championship as England finished runners up to hosts France. He was also a member of the squad that finished fifth at the 2019 World Rugby Under 20 Championship and during the tournament scored two tries in a pool game against Australia.

In October 2018, Hill received his first call-up by coach Eddie Jones to the senior squad for a training camp prior to the autumn internationals. On 17 November 2018 he made his Test debut as a 75th minute substitute in the victory over Japan.

In February 2025, having last played for England against the United States in 2021, Hill was a last minute replacement for George Martin, who had withdrawn through injury, returning to the matchday squad for the 2025 Six Nations fixture against Scotland. He also played in their next match against Italy as England ultimately finished runners up.

== Honours ==
Worcester Warriors

- Premiership Rugby Cup: 2021–2022

Bath

- Premiership Rugby: 2024–2025
- EPCR Challenge Cup: 2024–2025
