= Jack van Poortvliet =

English rugby union player

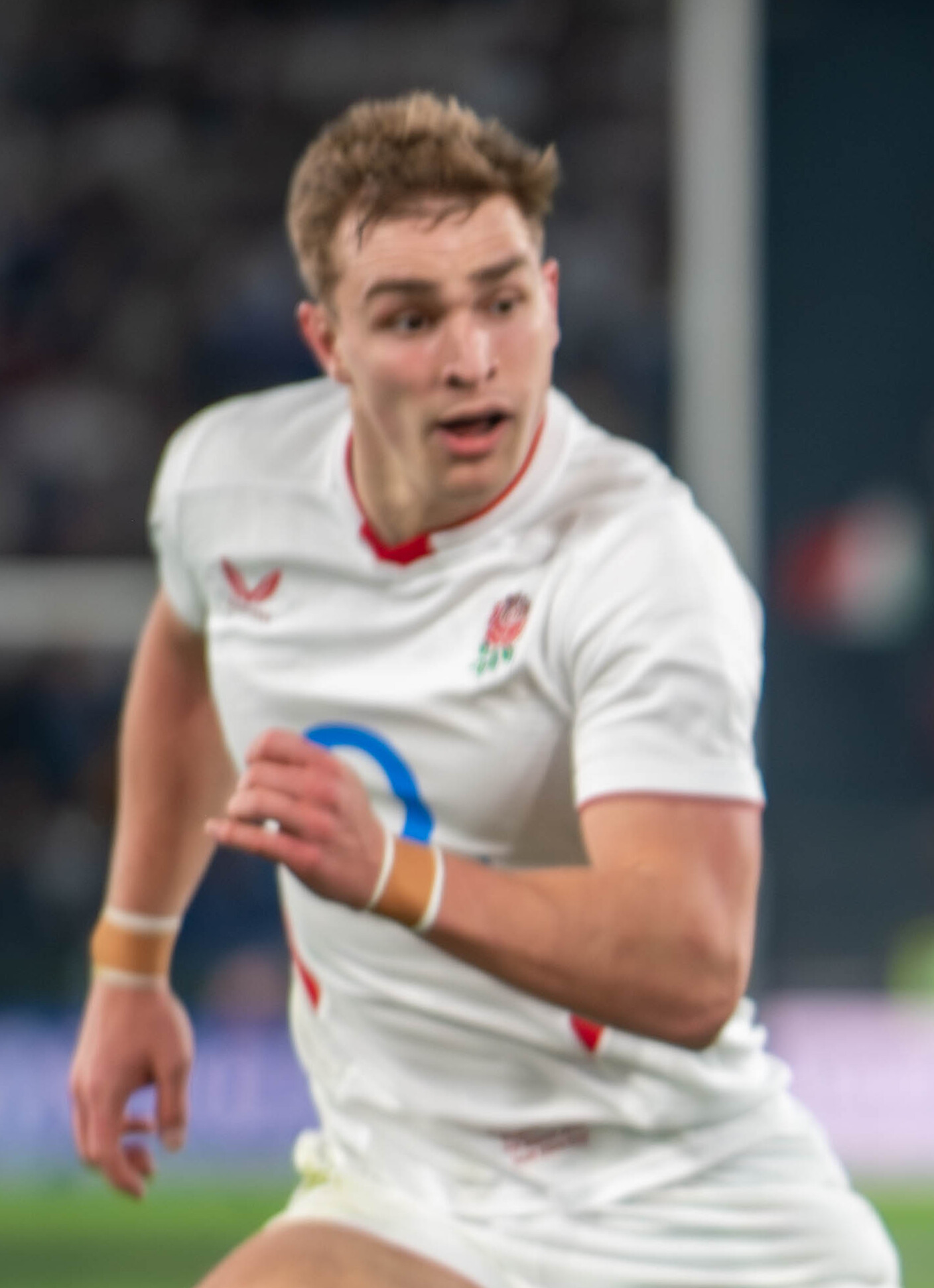
- van Poortvliet with England, 2026
- Full name: Jack Corstiaan van Poortvliet
- Born: 15 May 2001 (age 25) Colby, Norfolk, England
- Height: 1.83 m (6 ft 0 in)
- Weight: 84 kg (185 lb; 13 st 3 lb)
- School: Oakham School

Rugby union career
- Position: Scrum-half
- Current team: Leicester Tigers
Senior career
Years	Team	Apps	(Points)
2019–	Leicester Tigers	120	(105)
- Correct as of 1 November 2026
International career
Years	Team	Apps	(Points)
2020–2021	England U20	7	(15)
2022–	England	22	(20)
2025	England A	1	(5)
- Correct as of 21 February 2026

Jack Corstiaan van Poortvliet (born 15 May 2001) is an English professional rugby union player who plays as a scrum-half for Premiership Rugby club Leicester Tigers and the England national team.

== Club career ==
Van Poortvliet was born in Colby, Norfolk. While attending Taverham Hall School he began playing rugby for North Walsham, at 12-years-old he joined Leicester Tigers academy pathway and at 13 joined Oakham School to progress his rugby. Originally a fly half he switched position inside to scrum half and played as Leicester won the Under 18s academy league in the 2017–18 and 2018–19 seasons.

Following the success of the academy side, in July 2019, van Poortvliet was one of 11 players offered professional terms to join the club's development squad. He made his first team debut for Leicester on 21 September 2019 in a Premiership Rugby Cup match against Worcester Warriors at Sixways.

On 21 February 2020, van Poortvliet made his full Premiership debut in a 36–3 defeat to Sale Sharks at the AJ Bell Stadium in Salford. Van Poortvliet's kick was charged down for Sale's first try. He scored his first try for Leicester against Harlequins on 13 February 2021, which won the "try of the week" award for that round of the Premiership Rugby season. He scored against Exeter Chiefs where he darted off the back of a maul, sidestepping Olly Woodburn and diving over the try–line to score.

On 30 October 2021, van Poortvliet scored two tries after appearing as a substitute in the East Midlands Derby against Northampton Saints. He captained Leicester for the first time on 13 November 2021, in a 32-23 Premiership Rugby Cup win against Sale Sharks.

On 28 September 2022 van Poortvliet extended his contract at Leicester.

== International career ==
On 3 January 2020, van Poortvliet was named in the England under 20 squad for the 2020 Six Nations Championship. And he featured in first two matches against France and Scotland.

In June 2022 van Poortvliet received his first call-up to the senior England squad by coach Eddie Jones. He made his debut for England on 2 July 2022, scoring a consolation try as England lost 30–28 to Australia in Perth, Australia.

On 7 August 2023, van Poortvliet was named in England's squad for the 2023 Rugby World Cup, but suffered a significant ankle injury in England's second warm up international and was forced to withdraw from the squad.

On 21 February 2025, van Poortvliet was named as captain for England A against the Ireland Wolfhounds at Ashton Gate on 23 February 2025.

On 17 June 2025 van Poortvliet was called up to the British & Irish Lions training squad for their match against Argentina as part of the 2025 Lions Tour.

== Personal life ==
Van Poortvliet comes from a farming family. His great-grandfather moved to Norfolk from the Netherlands prior to World War I and bought a farm there. His family is part Scottish on his mother's side. His father Jeff played for Saracens in the 1990s.

== Career statistics ==
=== List of international tries ===
As of 8 November 2026

Try	Opposing team	Location	Venue	Competition	Date	Result	Score
1	Australia	Perth, Australia	Optus Stadium	2022 England rugby union tour of Australia	2 July 2022	Loss	30–28
2	Argentina	London, England	Twickenham Stadium	2022 Autumn Nations Series	6 November 2022	Loss	29–30
3	Argentina	San Juan Argentina	Estadio San Juan del Bicentenario		12 November 2025	Win	
4	Australia	London, England	Twickenham Stadium	2026 Nations Championship	8 November 2026	Win	45–22
