= Sam Jeffries (rugby union, born 1993) =

English rugby union player

- Born: Sam Jeffries; 1 April 1993 (age 33)
- Height: 6 ft 6 in (198 cm)
- Weight: 18 st 8 lb (260 lb; 118 kg)
- School: Plume Academy
- University: Bristol University

Rugby union career
- Position: Lock / Back Row
- Current team: Suntory Sungoliath
Senior career
Years	Team	Apps	(Points)
2016–2023	Bristol Bears	61	(35)
2021	→ Hartpury University	2	(0)
2023–	Suntory Sungoliath	41	(5)
- Correct as of 6 May 2025

Sam Jeffries (born 1 April 1993) is an English rugby union player who plays in the back row for Suntory Sungoliath in Japan Rugby League One.

== Career ==
He came through the academy system at Bristol Bears, going on to make his senior debut in February 2017, coming off the bench in a 50–17 loss against Leicester Tigers in the 15th round of the 2016–17 Premiership Rugby season. In 2019 he took a prolonged break from rugby due to a knee injury, Bristol Bears head coach Pat Lam appointed him as Professional Development Manager, sourcing and organising opportunities for the players and staff away from the pitch.

After 2 years away from playing Jefferies returned to Bristol's senior side in round 5 of the 2021–22 Premiership Rugby season, he started in a 13–5 loss against Newcastle Falcons.

He was called up to the England squad on 30 June 2022 as injury cover for Charlie Ewels on the Australia tour.

He left Bristol Bears at the end of the 2022–23 season to join Japanese side Tokyo Sungoliath in the Japan Rugby League One Division 1. Helping the side to a third place finish in his first season, he featured in all of Sungoliath's games in the 2023-24 season.
