= Guy Porter (rugby union) =

English rugby union player

- Born: Guy Edward Porter; 23 January 1997 (age 29) Kensington, London, England
- Height: 185 cm (6 ft 1 in)
- Weight: 96 kg (212 lb; 15 st 2 lb)
- University: University of Sydney

Rugby union career
- Position: Centre
Amateur team(s)
Years	Team	Apps	(Points)
2017–2019	Sydney University	29	(65)
Senior career
Years	Team	Apps	(Points)
2015	Sydney Stars	2	(5)
2018	Sydney Rays	2	(0)
2019	ACT Brumbies	0	(0)
2020–2024	Leicester Tigers	68	(70)
- Correct as of 19 November 2023
International career
Years	Team	Apps	(Points)
2022–2023	England	5	(10)
- Correct as of 5 August 2023

Guy Edward Porter (born on 23 January 1997) is an English former rugby union international player who played as a centre primarily played for Leicester Tigers in Premiership Rugby. He made his international debut for England on 9 July 2022 and overall made five appearances. In the summer of 2024 he announced his retirement following medical advice.

== Early life and education ==
Born in London, England, Porter started playing rugby for Rosslyn Park in south London. He moved with his family to Australia at the age of seven.

He studied law at Sydney University.

== Rugby player career ==
Porter came through the Australian rugby union system. He played for Sydney University, captaining the team in his final year. After then playing for Sydney Stars and Sydney Rays in Australia’s National Rugby Championship, in September 2019 Porter signed for the ACT Brumbies. The covid pandemic caused the suspension of the 2020 Super Rugby season.

Porter signed for English club Leicester Tigers on 20 July 2020, and made his debut on 22 August 2020 against Bath at Welford Road. At the end of his first season with the club he started in the 2020–21 European Rugby Challenge Cup final which Leicester lost against Montpellier to finish runners up.

On 26 December 2021 Porter scored the winning try on the final play of the match as Leicester beat Bristol Bears 28-26. Porter extended his contract with Leicester on 1 February 2022, and was named as the Leicester Mercury's man of the match for his performance against Worcester Warriors on 5 February. Porter started the 2022 Premiership Rugby final at inside centre and his defence was crucial as Leicester won 15-12 against Saracens.

In June 2022 Porter received his first call-up to the senior England squad by coach Eddie Jones for their tour of Australia. He was named on the bench for the first test and was an unused substitute as England lost 30–28. On 9 July 2022 Porter made his debut in the second test starting at centre in a 25-17 victory at Lang Park to level the series. He retained his place for the final test as England defeated the Wallabies at Sydney Cricket Ground to win the series.

Porter was selected for the 2022 end-of-year rugby union internationals and on 12 November 2022 scored the only tries of his international career in a victory over Japan. The following weekend saw him come off the bench as a substitute in a draw against New Zealand at Twickenham.

Porter was injured and therefore not included in the initial squad for the 2023 Six Nations Championship, but was called up by new coach Steve Borthwick to replace his Leicester Tigers team-mate Dan Kelly in the week before the tournament started, due to a thigh injury ruling Kelly out. Later that year Porter was included in a training squad for the 2023 Rugby World Cup. On 5 August 2023 Porter made his fifth and ultimately last appearance for England starting in a warm-up defeat against Wales at the Millennium Stadium. He was not chosen for the World Cup.

In April 2024, Leicester Tigers announced Porter would be among five players to be released, also including England international Nic Dolly, at the end of the 2023–24 season. In July 2024 Porter announced his effective retirement following advice from neurologists.

=== International tries ===
As of 13 November 2022

Try	Opposing team	Location	Venue	Competition	Date	Result	Score
1	Japan	London, England	Twickenham Stadium	2022 Autumn Nations Series	12 November 2022	Win	52 – 13
2	Japan	London, England	Twickenham Stadium	2022 Autumn Nations Series	12 November 2022	Win	52 – 13

== Honours ==
Leicester Tigers

- 1× Premiership: 2021–22
- 1× EPCR Challenge Cup runner up: 2020–21
