= Henry Arundell =

English rugby union player

- Born: Henry Patrick Sebastian Arundell; 8 November 2002 (age 24) Dhekelia, British Overseas Territories
- Height: 1.83 m (6 ft 0 in)
- Weight: 98 kg (216 lb; 15 st 6 lb)
- School: Beechen Cliff School; Harrow School

Rugby union career
- Position(s): Fullback, Wing
- Current team: Bath Rugby
Senior career
| Years | Team | Apps | (Points) |
| 2021–2023 | London Irish | 23 | (50) |
| 2023–2025 | Racing 92 | 32 | (75) |
| 2025– | Bath | 18 | (65) |
- Correct as of 1 May 2026
International career
| Years | Team | Apps | (Points) |
| 2022 | England U20 | 3 | (20) |
| 2022– | England | 13 | (60) |
- Correct as of 17 February 2026

Henry Patrick Sebastian Arundell (born 8 November 2002) is an English professional rugby union player who plays wing for Prem Rugby club Bath and England.

== Early life ==
Arundell was born on Cyprus in 2002, at the then Royal Air Force base in Dhekelia; a Sovereign Base Area and British Overseas Territory. He spent the first two years of his life in Cyprus before his family moved back to England.

His father, Ralph Arundell, was an army officer in The Rifles (formerly The Light Infantry) for thirty years, completing tours in Northern Ireland, Iraq and Afghanistan. His mother, Jane Arundell, is a nurse and health visitor working for the NHS.

Arundell started his sporting career at a young age, excelling at various sports while a pupil at Holt VC Primary School in Wiltshire. He subsequently attended Beechen Cliff School in nearby Bath. After his father joined the staff of Harrow School in Greater London, Arundell was enrolled at the all-boys' boarding school, putting him in the catchment area for London Irish's academy, which he joined aged fourteen.

== Club career ==
=== London Irish ===
In the Premiership Rugby Cup in 2022, a number of Arundell's performances drew attention, including two tries against Leicester Tigers in a semi-final; a 20-minute substitute appearance against Wasps, scoring a try and being named Man of the Match, and a try that started on his own goal-line against Toulon.

His performances for London Irish saw him named as Premiership Rugby's young player of the season for 2021–22. On 10 June 2022, Arundell signed a new "long term" contract with London Irish.

=== Racing 92 ===
After London Irish collapsed into administration in June 2023, Arundell joined Grand Paris-based French side Racing 92. After the Rugby World Cup, he played his first game for the Sky Blue and Whites at Toulon on 12 November and scored a hat-trick in a 31–26 narrow loss.

On 12 December, Racing 92 announced his contract extension until 2026, despite outside interest from Premiership Rugby clubs like Bath and Gloucester as well as National Rugby League teams.

=== Bath Rugby ===
In February 2025, Arundell signed for Bath ahead of the 2025–26 season. In September 2025, on his Prem debut for the club, he scored two tries in a 47–31 victory over Harlequins. The following week he scored a try on his home debut in a 28–16 victory over Sale Sharks. In November 2025, he scored the two tries including the winning score in a 36–29 victory away to Saracens.

== International career ==
Arundell was highlighted as "one to watch" in the 2022 Six Nations Under 20s Championship, and was the competition's joint-top try scorer, scoring four.

Before making his debut for the England senior side, Arundell was eligible to play for both Scotland and Wales through his ancestry as well as Cyprus through his birth.

Arundell was named as an "apprentice player" in England's squad for their 2022 tour of Australia. He scored a try, from his first touch, on his debut on 2 July 2022, coming on from the bench. In 2022, he was nominated for Breakthrough Player of the Year before eventually losing out to Ange Capuozzo.

He was named in England's 2023 Rugby World Cup squad on 7 August 2023, scoring a joint England record 5 tries on his World Cup debut against Chile on 23 September 2023 in a 71–0 win.

In February 2025, having re-signed for an English club for the following season, he once again became eligible to play for the national team ahead of the 2025 summer tour of the United States and Argentina. In June 2025, having played his final game for Racing 92, he joined up with the England camp ahead of the summer tour. In November 2025, he scored a try from the bench on his first appearance since the 2023 Rugby World Cup during a 38–18 victory against Fiji in the 2025 Autumn Nations Series.

In February 2026, he scored in a hattrick in the opening round of the 2026 Six Nations in a 48–7 victory against Wales. In the following game, he scored a try and received a yellow card for a cynical play before receiving another yellow card for a dangerous challenge in the air on Kyle Steyn, resulting in a 20-minute red card, during a defeat to Scotland. He avoided a suspension and was named in the starting lineup against Ireland in the following fixture.

== Career statistics ==
=== List of international tries ===
As of 23 February 2026

| Try | Opposing team | Location | Venue | Competition | Date | Result | Score |
|---|---|---|---|---|---|---|---|
| 1 | Australia | Perth, Australia | Optus Stadium | 2022 England rugby union tour of Australia | 2 July 2022 | Loss | 30 - 28 |
| 2 | Italy | London, England | Twickenham Stadium | 2023 Six Nations | 12 February 2023 | Win | 31–14 |
| 3 | Chile | Lille, France | Stade Pierre-Mauroy | 2023 Rugby World Cup | 23 September 2023 | Win | 71–0 |
| 4 | Chile | Lille, France | Stade Pierre-Mauroy | 2023 Rugby World Cup | 23 September 2023 | Win | 71–0 |
| 5 | Chile | Lille, France | Stade Pierre-Mauroy | 2023 Rugby World Cup | 23 September 2023 | Win | 71–0 |
| 6 | Chile | Lille, France | Stade Pierre-Mauroy | 2023 Rugby World Cup | 23 September 2023 | Win | 71–0 |
| 7 | Chile | Lille, France | Stade Pierre-Mauroy | 2023 Rugby World Cup | 23 September 2023 | Win | 71–0 |
| 8 | Fiji | London, England | Twickenham Stadium | 2025 Autumn Internationals | 8 November 2025 | Win | 38–18 |
| 9 | Wales | London, England | Twickenham Stadium | 2026 Six Nations | 7 February 2026 | Win | 48–7 |
| 10 | Wales | London, England | Twickenham Stadium | 2026 Six Nations | 7 February 2026 | Win | 48–7 |
| 11 | Wales | London, England | Twickenham Stadium | 2026 Six Nations | 7 February 2026 | Win | 48–7 |
| 12 | Scotland | Edinburgh, Scotland | Murrayfield Stadium | 2026 Six Nations | 14 February 2026 | Loss | 31 - 20 |
