= Ellis Genge =

English rugby union player (born 1995)

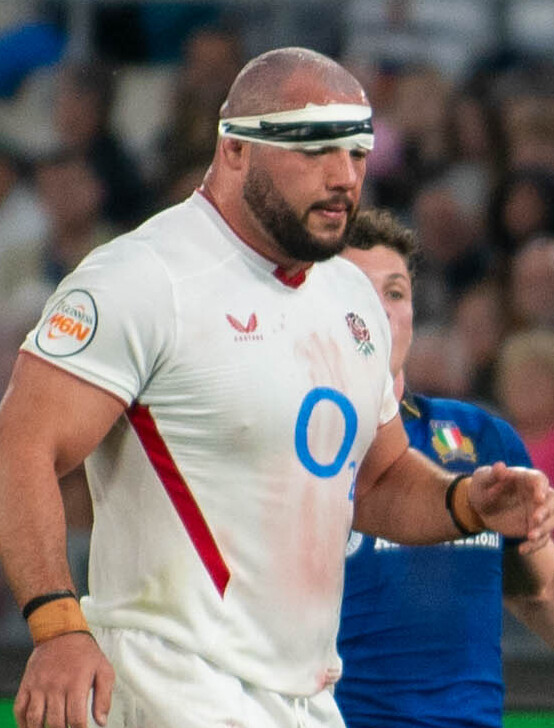
- Genge with England in 2026
- Born: 16 February 1995 (age 31) Bristol, England
- Height: 1.87 m (6 ft 2 in)
- Weight: 127 kg (280 lb; 20 st 0 lb)
- School: Hartpury College

Rugby union career
- Position: Prop
- Current team: Bristol Bears
Senior career
Years	Team	Apps	(Points)
2014–2016	Bristol Bears	18	(25)
2016–2022	Leicester Tigers	111	(70)
2022–	Bristol Bears	53	(60)
- Correct as of 18 May 2026
International career
Years	Team	Apps	(Points)
2015	England U20	8	(5)
2016–	England	80	(40)
2025	British & Irish Lions	3	(0)
- Correct as of 24th March 2026
Medal record
Men's Rugby union
Representing England
Rugby World Cup
Silver medal – second place	2019 Japan	Squad

Ellis Genge (born 16 February 1995) is an English professional rugby union player who plays as a prop for Premiership Rugby club Bristol Bears and the England national team.

Before moving to Leicester Tigers, Genge had a brief professional career with Bristol. He played in more than 100 games during his tenure with Leicester, captaining the team to a Premiership title in 2022. In 2016, Genge made his senior debut for England against Wales.

== Early life ==
Born in Bristol Genge grew up on the Knowle West council estate, and was educated at John Cabot Academy. He is a fan of Bristol Rovers football club.

He started playing rugby aged twelve at Old Redcliffians playing in the back row. At sixteen, Genge moved to Hartpury College and captained their rugby team to victory in the AASE league. Genge represented England at youth level from U17 up to U20. According to Genge, he was first introduced to the front row by former England youth coach Bobby Walsh originally to have as an additional option but this eventually resulted in a permanent career change.

== Club career ==
=== Bristol (2013–2016) ===
Genge joined Bristol at the age of eighteen and was convinced to change position from back row to prop by the offer of a two-year contract if he made the positional change. He went on loan to Clifton to play loosehead prop in National 2 South during the 2014–2015 season starting thirteen games and coming on as a substitute in one other match. He was also signed by Plymouth Albion, in the same season, in a dual-registration deal with Bristol, playing 2 matches.

Genge made his professional debut for Bristol on 8 December 2013 in the British and Irish Cup against Scottish side Gala, scoring a try in a 62–7 win. His first league game in the RFU Championship came against London Scottish on 26 September 2014. Genge represented England at under-17 level. He was a member of the England Under-20 squad that won the 2015 Six Nations Under 20s Championship. Later that year he started for the side that lost to New Zealand in the final of the 2015 World Rugby Under 20 Championship to finish runners up.

He made 26 appearances during his first spell at the club.

=== Leicester Tigers (2016–2022) ===
Genge gained the attention of Richard Cockerill, moving to Leicester Tigers on loan in February 2016. The move was, in part, due to off-field issues, including being arrested after an away game against Ulster in 2015. He made his Leicester debut as substitute against Wasps on 12 March 2016, replacing Marcos Ayerza, and his first start came on 7 May 2016 against Bath at the Rec. The move to Leicester was made permanent on 26 May 2016.

Genge became a regular for Leicester in the 2016–17 season playing a club-leading 31 matches in the season. It was during this campaign he started for the side that defeated Exeter Chiefs in the final of the 2016–17 Anglo-Welsh Cup. The season ended with him named the club's young player of the year and winning the Premiership Discovery of the Season Award.

On 2 December 2017 Genge suffered a shoulder injury in a league match against Wasps. After four months injured he returned to the starting line up on 7 April 2018 against Bath in a match at Twickenham.

For Leicester, Genge scored a try against Ulster in the semi-final of the 2021 EPCR Challenge Cup as Leicester came back from an 11-point half-time deficit to win. He then started in the final as they finished runners up to Montpellier by a single point.

Genge captained Leicester for the first time in September 2020, a 54–7 defeat away to Wasps, and was appointed as the club's permanent captain, replacing Tom Youngs, before the 2021-22 Premiership Rugby season. Genge led Leicester to their first league title for nine seasons as they beat Saracens 15–12 in the 2022 Premiership Final.

=== Return to Bristol Bears (2022–) ===
On 15 December 2021 it was confirmed that Genge would leave Leicester in the summer of 2022 to re-join Bristol. The signing was announced with a video that caused controversy. Genge revealed that closeness to family and the ability to see them regularly played a key part in his decision, with COVID lockdowns having caused him to re-assess his priorities.

== International career ==
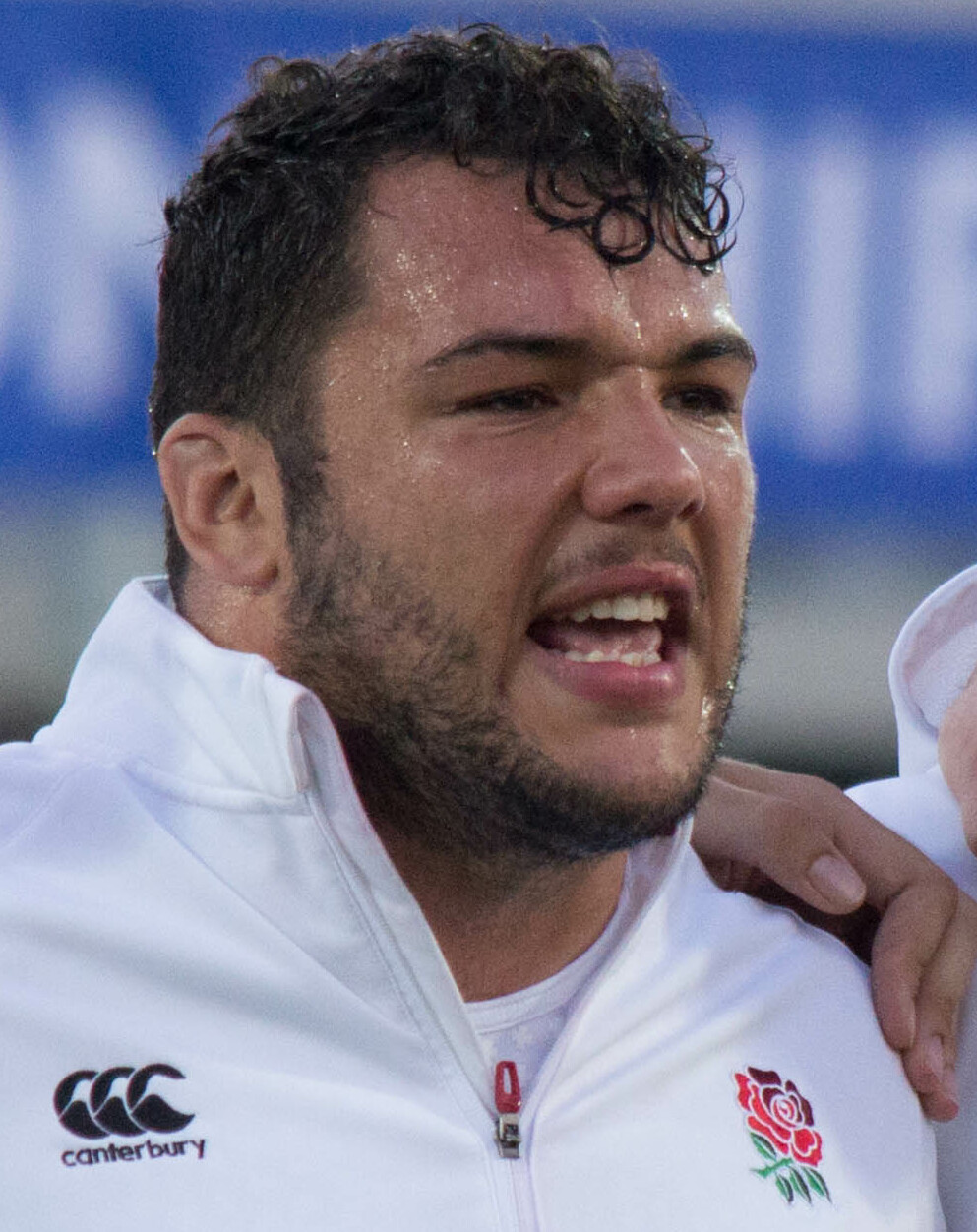
Genge with England under-20s in 2015.

=== England debut (2016–2018) ===
In May 2016 Genge received his first call-up to the senior England squad by coach Eddie Jones after only one start for Leicester. On 29 May 2016 he made his international debut as a second-half substitute during a 27–13 win against Wales at Twickenham. Genge was included on the 2016 England rugby union tour of Australia but was not used in any of the matches.

At the end of the season with Joe Marler and Mako Vunipola selected for the 2017 British & Irish Lions tour to New Zealand, Genge made his first start for England on their tour of Argentina.

=== Rugby World Cup (2019) ===
Genge scored his first international try in a warm-up game for the 2019 Rugby World Cup against Italy at St James' Park. He was selected for his first world cup and made two substitute appearances at the tournament both during the pool stage against Tonga and USA. He did not participate in the knockout phase as England finished runners up to South Africa.

=== England regular starter (2020–) ===
Genge scored the winning try against Scotland during the 2020 Six Nations Championship. After the delay caused by the COVID Pandemic lockdown he came off the bench in the final round of the competition as England beat Italy to win the tournament. Genge started for England as they defeated France in extra time to win the Autumn Nations Cup. In July 2021 Genge scored a try against Canada.

Genge was included in the squad for the 2022 tour of Australia and scored a try in the first test match, which England lost 30–28. He was prominent during the second test victory in Brisbane and then started again in the decisive final match as England defeated Australia at Sydney Cricket Ground to win the series.

On 21 November 2022, Genge was named in World Rugby's team of the year as the best loosehead prop.

=== British & Irish Lions Tour (2025) ===
On 8 May 2025, Genge was included in the British & Irish Lions tour of Australia.

== Personal life ==
Genge is mixed race. His father is White British and his maternal grandfather is African American. He has stated that he has Welsh family.

He has developmental coordination disorder (dyspraxia).

In September 2020, Genge became a father to his first child, a son.

Genge's scrummaging has benefited from the guidance of veteran internationals Marcos Ayerza and Dan Cole. He is noted for his ball-carrying ability, physicality and high work-rate.

== Career statistics ==
=== List of international tries ===
as of 13 November 2022

No.	Date	Venue	Opponent	Score	Result	Competition	Ref.
1	6 September 2019	St James' Park, Newcastle, England	Italy	28–0	37–0	2019 Rugby World Cup warm-up matches	
2	8 February 2020	Murrayfield Stadium, Edinburgh, Scotland	Scotland	8–3	13–6	2020 Six Nations Championship	
3	10 July 2021	Twickenham Stadium, London, England	Canada	40–14	70–14	2021 July rugby union tests	
4	2 July 2022	Optus Stadium, Perth, Australia	Australia	11–9	28–30	2022 England rugby union tour of Australia	
5	12 November 2022	Twickenham Stadium, London, England	Japan	29–6	52–13	2022 end-of-year rugby union internationals	
6	4 February 2023	Twickenham Stadium, London, England	Scotland	18–12	23–29	2023 Six Nations Championship	
7	14 November 2026	Twickenham Stadium, London, England	Japan		78–15	2026 Nations Championship	
8	21 November 2026	Twickenham Stadium, London, England	New Zealand		37–12	2026 Nations Championship	

as of 21 November 2026

== Honours ==
England

- Six Nations Championship: 2020
- Autumn Nations Cup: 2020
- Rugby World Cup runner-up: 2019

Leicester Tigers

- Premiership Rugby: 2022
- Anglo-Welsh Cup: 2017
- EPCR Challenge Cup runner-up: 2021
