= Freddie Steward =

England international rugby union player

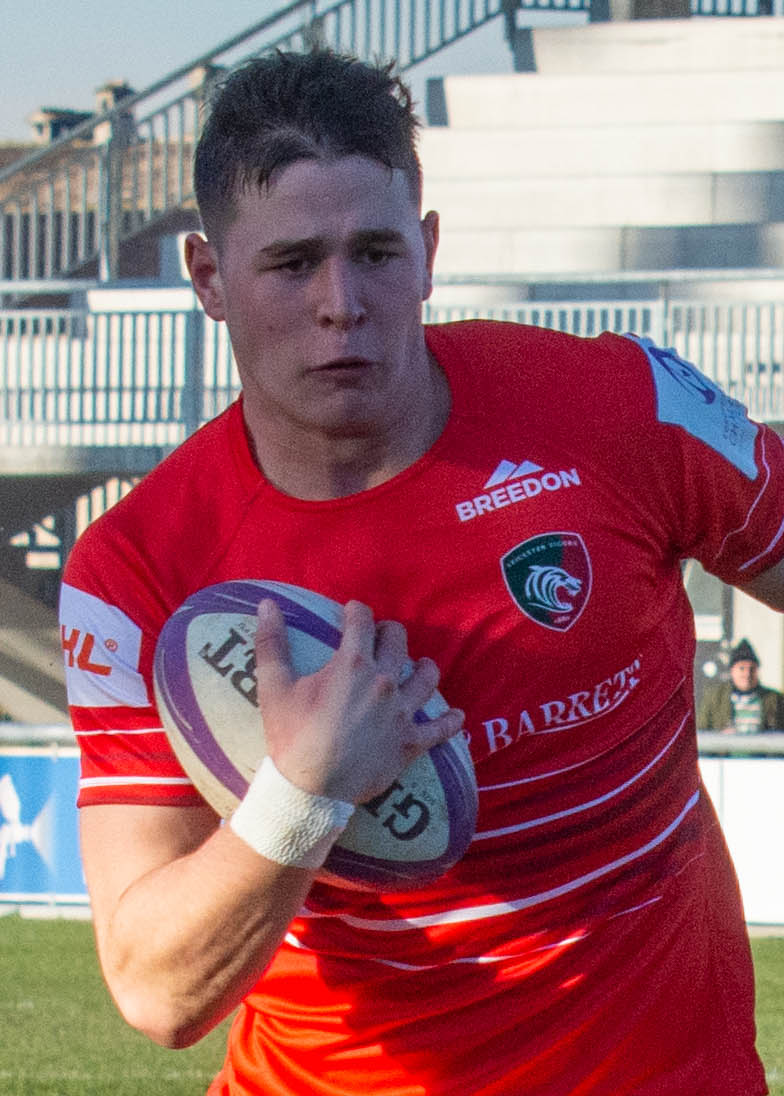
- Steward in 2019
- Full name: Freddie Nicholas Overbury Steward
- Born: 5 December 2000 (age 25) Dereham, England
- Height: 1.96 m (6 ft 5 in)
- Weight: 107 kg (236 lb; 16 st 12 lb)
- School: Norwich School

Rugby union career
- Position(s): Fullback, Wing
- Current team: Leicester Tigers
Senior career
| Years | Team | Apps | (Points) |
| 2019– | Leicester Tigers | 137 | (178) |
| 2019 | Ampthill | 1 | (0) |
- Correct as of 26 October 2026
International career
| Years | Team | Apps | (Points) |
| 2020 | England U20 | 3 | (5) |
| 2021– | England | 41 | (50) |
- Correct as of 3 February 2025
Medal record
Men's Rugby union
Representing England
Rugby World Cup
| Bronze medal – third place | 2023 France | Squad |

Freddie Nicholas Overbury Steward (born 5 December 2000) is an English professional rugby union player who plays as a fullback for Premiership Rugby club Leicester Tigers and the England national team.

== Early life ==
Steward started playing rugby at Swaffham RFC, but at ten years old he moved to Holt RFC as Swaffham's age group folded. He initially played fly half, before moving to inside centre at Norwich School and settling at full back at 16. Steward came through the Leicester Tigers academy.

== Club career ==
Steward made his senior debut as a replacement on 26 January 2019 in a 47–20 defeat to Northampton Saints at Franklin's Gardens in the Premiership Rugby Cup. Two weeks later Steward was back playing for Leicester's under-18 side as they won a second successive league title.

Steward was a late call-up to the bench on 8 March 2019 to make his Premiership Rugby debut as a replacement in a 32–5 defeat to Sale Sharks at the AJ Bell Stadium. His first appearance at Welford Road was in a Premiership Rugby Cup on 27 September 2019 against Exeter Chiefs. Steward scored his first try for Leicester in a 2019-20 European Rugby Challenge Cup against Calvisano.

Steward was highlighted as one of the potential breakout players in the 2019-20 Premiership Rugby season by Rugbypass.

He started the 2022 Premiership Rugby final as Tigers beat Saracens 15–12. On his first match for Leicester of the 2022-23 Premiership Rugby season, Steward scored a hat-trick in the 250th East Midlands derby as Leicester beat Northampton 41–21. On 28 September 2022, Steward extended his contract at Leicester. Steward made his 100th appearance for Leicester on 11 January 2025 in a Champions Cup match against Ulster at Welford Road.

== International career ==
On 3 January 2020 Steward was named in the England under 20 squad for the 2020 Six Nations Championship. Steward made his full England debut on 4 July 2021 when he started at full back against the United States at Twickenham. He scored his first England try on 13 November 2021, after taking a pass from Marcus Smith he rounded full-back Kurtley Beale for a first half score as England beat Australia 32–15.

In May 2022 Steward was named as the Rugby Players' Association Player's Young player of the year and England men's player of the season, as well as being named in their inaugural under-23 team of the season.

Steward was selected for the 2022 England rugby union tour of Australia, starting at full back in all three tests as England won the series 2–1.

On 21 November 2022, Steward was named in World Rugby's team of the year as the best full back. On 17 May 2023, Steward was named for the second year in succession as the Rugby Players' Association England men's player of the season.

On 7 August 2023, Steward was named in England's squad for the 2023 Rugby World Cup.

Steward sometimes kicks penalties from long range.

== Career statistics ==
=== List of international tries ===
as of 19 November 2023

| No. | Date | Venue | Opponent | Score | Result | Competition |
|---|---|---|---|---|---|---|
| 1 | 13 November 2021 | Twickenham Stadium, London, England | Australia | 5–3 | 32–15 | 2021 end-of-year rugby union internationals |
| 2 | 20 November 2021 | Twickenham Stadium, London, England | South Africa | 12–3 | 27–26 | 2021 end-of-year rugby union internationals |
| 3 | 19 March 2022 | Stade de France, Saint-Denis, France | France | 11–18 | 13–25 | 2022 Six Nations Championship |
| 4 | 16 July 2022 | Sydney Cricket Ground, Sydney, Australia | Australia | 11–10 | 21–17 | 2022 England rugby union tour of Australia |
| 5 | 12 November 2022 | Twickenham Stadium, London, England | Japan | 8–0 | 52–13 | 2022 end-of-year rugby union internationals |
| 6 | 19 November 2022 | Twickenham Stadium, London, England | New Zealand | 23–25 | 25–25 | 2022 end-of-year rugby union internationals |
| 7 | 11 March 2023 | Twickenham Stadium, London, England | France | 8–27 | 10–53 | 2023 Six Nations Championship |
| 8 | 17 September 2023 | Stade de Nice, Nice, France | Japan | 25–12 | 34–12 | 2023 Rugby World Cup |
| 9 | 14 November 2026 | Twickenham Stadium, London, England | Japan | | 78–15 | 2026 Nations Championship |

as of 14 November 2026
