= Will Stuart =

England international rugby union prop (born 1996)

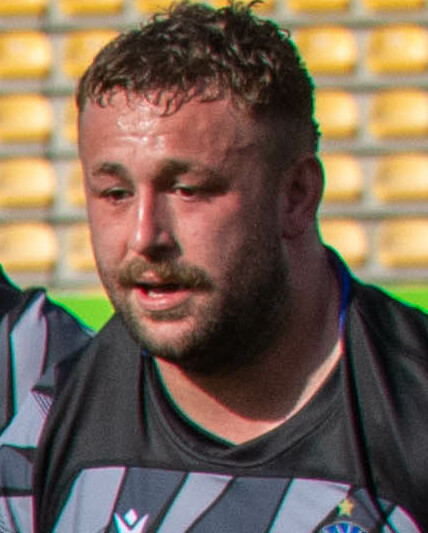
- Stuart at the 2020–21 European Rugby Challenge Cup
- Full name: William James Stuart
- Born: 12 July 1996 (age 30) Westminster, England
- Height: 1.88 m (6 ft 2 in)
- Weight: 135 kg (298 lb; 21 st 4 lb)
- School: Farleigh School; Radley College
- Notable relative: Sam Smith (Singer)

Rugby union career
- Position: Prop
- Current team: Bath
Senior career
| Years | Team | Apps | (Points) |
| 2014–2019 | Wasps | 32 | (20) |
| 2014–2016 | → Blackheath (loan) | 12 | (5) |
| 2016–2017 | → Birmingham Moseley (loan) | 6 | (0) |
| 2017–2019 | → Nottingham (loan) | 8 | (5) |
| 2019– | Bath | 105 | (70) |
- Correct as of 1 May 2026
International career
| Years | Team | Apps | (Points) |
| 2016 | England U20 | 10 | (0) |
| 2020– | England | 53 | (15) |
| 2025 | British & Irish Lions | 3 | (5) |
- Correct as of 2 August 2025

William James Stuart (born 12 July 1996) is an English professional rugby union player who plays as a prop for Premiership Rugby club Bath and the England national team.

== Early life ==
Stuart started playing rugby at Andover RFC in Hampshire before moving on to Salisbury RFC in Wiltshire. He was schooled at Radley College in Oxfordshire. He went to a prep school called Farleigh School.

== Club career ==
Stuart joined the Wasps academy after leaving school. He spent time on loan in National League 1 and the RFU Championship with Blackheath, Moseley and Nottingham. Stuart made his Wasps debut on 4 November 2016 against Sale Sharks.

On 18 January 2019, his signing for the 2019–20 season was announced by Bath. Stuart played in the 2024 Premiership Rugby final which saw Bath lose against Northampton Saints to finish league runners up.

Stuart started in the 2024–25 EPCR Challenge Cup final as Bath beat Lyon to win their first European trophy for seventeen years. The following month Stuart played in the 2025 Premiership final which saw Bath beat Leicester Tigers to become champions of England for the first time since 1996.

== International career ==
=== England ===
Stuart represented England at the 2016 World Rugby Under 20 Championship and came off the bench in the final as England defeated Ireland to become junior World champions.

In January 2020, Stuart received his first call up by coach Eddie Jones to the senior England squad for the 2020 Six Nations Championship. On 2 February 2020 Stuart made his Test debut as a replacement for Kyle Sinckler in the opening round defeat away to France. He also played in the final round as England beat Italy to win the tournament.

In November 2020, Stuart made his first start for England in their opening game of the Autumn Nations Cup against Georgia and subsequently came off the bench in the final as England defeated France after extra-time to win the competition.

Stuart started all three tests on their 2022 tour of Australia as England won the series. Later that year on 19 November 2022, Stuart came off the bench against New Zealand to score his first two international tries which would subsequently draw the game 25–25, with England having been 17–3 down at half time. This made him the first England prop to score twice in a test match.

Stuart was included in the England squad for the 2023 Rugby World Cup. He played in three of their pool games. Stuart was not selected for either the quarter-final victory over Fiji or semi-final elimination against champions South Africa. He made his only start of the tournament in their last fixture as England defeated Argentina to finish third with the Bronze medal.

Stuart started all five of their games during the 2025 Six Nations Championship. In the last round Stuart scored a try on his fiftieth appearance for England as they beat Wales at the Millennium Stadium to finish runners up.

=== British & Irish Lions ===
On 8 May 2025 it was announced that Stuart had been selected for the British & Irish Lions squad by coach Andy Farrell for their 2025 tour of Australia.

Stuart made his Test debut for the Lions off the bench during the opening match of the series. He also replaced Tadhg Furlong as a substitute in the next game at Sydney Cricket Ground which the Lions also won to claim their first series win in twelve years. In the last match of the tour at Stadium Australia, Stuart scored a consolation try in a defeat as the Wallabies prevented a whitewash.

=== List of international tries ===
as of 2 August 2025

| No. | Date | Venue | Opponent | Score | Result | Competition |
|---|---|---|---|---|---|---|
| 1 | 19 November 2022 | Twickenham Stadium, London, England | New Zealand | 11–25 | 25–25 | 2022 end-of-year rugby union internationals |
| 2 | 19 November 2022 | Twickenham Stadium, London, England | New Zealand | 23–25 | 25–25 | 2022 end-of-year rugby union internationals |
| 3 | 15 March 2025 | Principality Stadium, Cardiff, Wales | Wales | 33–7 | 68–14 | 2025 Six Nations Championship |
| 4 | 2 August 2025 | Stadium Australia, Sydney, Australia | Australia | 12–22 | 12–22 | 2025 British & Irish Lions tour to Australia |

== Honours ==
Bath

- Premiership Rugby: 2024–2025
- EPCR Challenge Cup: 2024–2025

England

- Six Nations Championship: 2020
- Autumn Nations Cup: 2020
- Rugby World Cup (bronze) Third place: 2023
