= Sheehan =

Sheehan (also spelt Sheahan and Sheahen) is the Anglicisation of the Irish Gaelic surname Ó Síodhacháin, meaning the peaceful one. It is most common in counties Cork, Kerry and Limerick. It is the 77th most common surname in Ireland.

Notable people with the surname include:

- Al Sheehan (1899–1967), American entertainment businessman and radio host
- Bill Sheehan (biologist) (born 1947), American biologist and environmental advocate
- Bill Sheehan (hurler) (born 1997), Irish hurler
- Billy Sheehan (born 1953), American rock bassist
- Bobby Sheehan (ice hockey) (born 1949), American retired National Hockey League center
- Bobby Sheehan (musician) (1968–1999), American rock bassist
- Cindy Sheehan (born 1957), American anti-war politician and activist
- Con Sheehan, Irish boxer
- Cornelius Sheehan (disambiguation)
- D. D. Sheehan (1873–1948), Irish politician, journalist, and labour leader
- Dan Sheehan, Ireland and British Lions rugby player
- Daniel Sheehan (disambiguation)
- David Sheehan (1938–2020), American television personality
- Edward Sheehan (1930–2008), American journalist, diplomat and novelist
- Emmett Sheehan (born 1999), American Major League Baseball pitcher for the Los Angeles Dodgers
- Erin Sheehan, American politician
- Fran Sheehan (born 1949), American rock bassist
- Frank Sheehan (1933–2013), Canadian politician
- Gary Sheehan (ice hockey) (born 1964), Canadian-Swiss ice hockey coach
- Gary Sheehan (police officer) (1960–1983), Irish Garda Síochána officer killed during a hostage rescue operation
- Gary Sheehan (racing driver) (born 1968), American racing driver
- Harold Leeming Sheehan (1900–1988), British endocrinologist, for whom Sheehan's syndrome was named circa 1937
- Heather Sheehan (born 1961), American artist
- Helena Sheehan, American-born Irish academic and former nun
- James J. Sheehan (born 1937), American historian
- Jim Sheehan (1889–1967), Australian politician
- Joe Sheehan (politician) (born 1957), American politician
- John Sheehan (disambiguation)
- Maree Sheehan (born 1969), New Zealand singer, composer and artist
- Mark Sheehan (1976–2023), guitarist for The Script
- Michael Sheehan (disambiguation)
- Neil Sheehan (1936–2021), Pulitzer Prize-winning American journalist, husband of Susan Sheehan
- P. A. Ó Síocháin (1905–1995), Irish journalist, lawyer, author, son of D. D. Sheehan
- P. J. Sheehan (1933–2020), Irish politician
- Patrick Augustine Sheehan (1852–1913), Irish Catholic clergyman and author
- Patty Sheehan (born 1956), American golfer
- Paul Sheehan (golfer) (born 1977), Australian professional golfer
- Paul Sheehan (journalist) (born 1951), Australian journalist
- Rhian Sheehan, New Zealand music composer and producer
- Robert Sheehan (born 1988), Irish actor
- Robert F. Sheehan (1922–1969), American photographer
- Samantha Sheehan (born 1986), American artistic gymnast
- Spencer Sheehan, American attorney
- Susan Sheehan (born 1937), Pulitzer Prize-winning American author, wife of Neil Sheehan
- Terry Sheehan (born 1970), Canadian politician
- Thomas Sheehan (philosopher) (born 1941), American academic
- Tom Sheehan (1894–1982), Major League Baseball pitcher and manager
- Tom Sheehan (politician) (1891–1955), Australian politician
- Tommy Sheehan (baseball) (1877–1959), Major League Baseball third baseman
- Tommy Sheehan (Gaelic footballer) (born 1966), Irish Gaelic footballer
- Tommy Sheehan, Survivor: Island of the Idols winner
- Timothy P. Sheehan (1909–2000), American Congressman
- Vincent Sheehan (disambiguation)
- William F. Sheehan (1859–1917), American politician
- Winfield R. Sheehan (1883–1945), American film producer and executive

== See also ==
- O'Sheehan, an Irish clan originally from County Clare
- Sheean (disambiguation)
