= Shean =

Shean is both a surname and a given name. Notable people with the name include:

Surname

- Al Shean (1868–1949), comedian and vaudeville performer
- Dave Shean (1883–1963), American professional baseball second baseman
- Kelli Shean (born 1987), golfer from South Africa

Given name

- Shean Donovan (born 1975), Canadian professional ice hockey coach and former player
- Shean Garlito (born 1994), Belgian footballer
- Chan Chi-shean or Steve Chan (born 1948), Taiwanese physician and politician
- Yan Wing-shean (born 1966), Taiwanese fencer

== See also ==
- Gallagher and Shean, musical comedy double act in vaudeville and on Broadway in the 1910s and 1920s, consisting of Edward Gallagher (1873–1929), and Al Shean (1868–1949)
- Mister Gallagher and Mister Shean, one of the most famous songs to come from vaudeville
- Gradam Shean-nós Cois Life, annual award by the Sean-nós Cois Life-festival in Dublin
- Beit-Shean, a city in the Northern District of Israel at the junction of the Jordan River Valley and the Jezreel Valley
- Sean
- Sheahan
- Sheean (disambiguation)
- Sheeaun
- Sheehan
