= List of Irish clans =

The following is a list of Irish clans sourced from modern published sources.

Unlike Scottish clans which are defined by surnames recognised by Scottish law of the Court of the Lord Lyon, there is no definitive authority on which surnames are regarded as Irish clans.

== Irish clan organisations ==
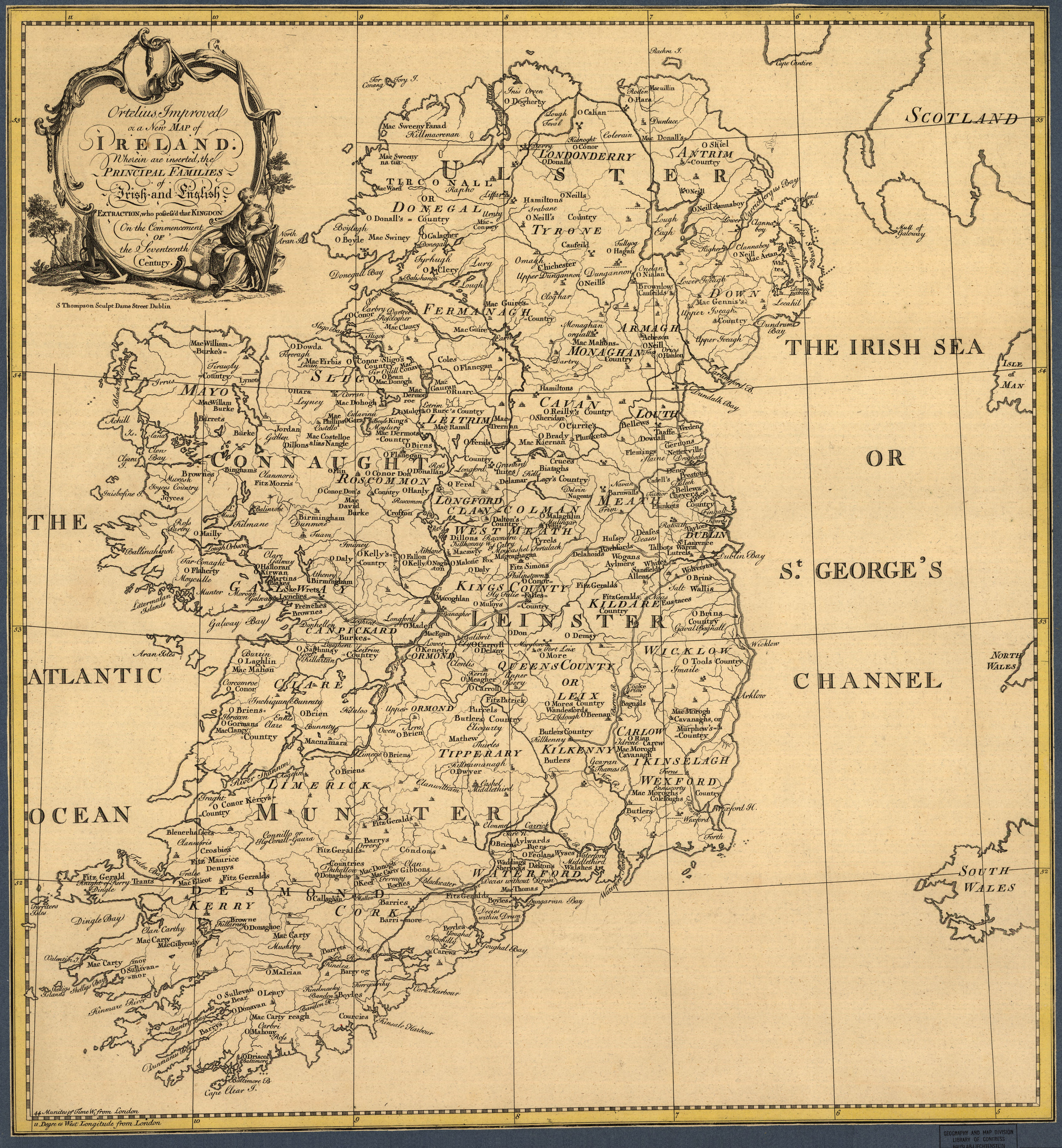
Map showing principal Irish surnames at the commencement of the 17th century

Clans of Ireland is a private company limited by guarantee. The organisation's eligibility criteria for membership requires that the family or clan can trace their ancestry back to before 1691, which they consider to mark the end of the clan-based lineage system in Ireland. There can be more than one clan with the same surname if of a different ancestry. Clans of Ireland maintains a list of paid-up members on their 2025 Register of Clans, some of whom have their own clan societies or associations.

The Council of Irish Clans is another membership organisation that maintains a register of Irish clans that can trace their ancestry back to before 1641, which they consider to mark the end of the Irish clan-based lineage system.

== LangSyne Publishers ==
LangSyne Publishers, who are based in Kilbarrack, Dublin, Ireland, have published individual books on the following Irish clan surnames and their histories: Barry, Boyle, Brady, Brennan, Burke, Byrne, Callaghan, Carroll, Casey, Cassidy, Clancy, Collins, Connolly, Coyle, Daly, Devlin, Doherty, Donnelly, Donovan, Doran, Doyle, Duffy, Dunne, Farrell, Fitzgerald, Fitzpatrick, Flaherty, Flanagan, Flynn, Foley, Gallagher, Griffin, Healy, Higgins, Hogan, Joyce, Kane, Kavanagh, Kelly, Kennedy, Kenny, Lynch, Maguire, Malone, McCarthy, McCormick, McDermott, McGrath, McGuigan, McKenna, McLoughlin, McMahon, McManus, McNamara, Moore, Moran, Mullan, Murphy, Nolan, O'Brien, O'Dowd, O'Dwyer, O'Grady, O'Halloran, O'Hara, O'Keeffe, O'Leary, O'Neill, O'Rourke, O'Shea, O'Connor, Quinn, Reagan, Reilly, Rooney, Ryan, Sheehan, Sheridan, Sullivan, Sweeney, Traynor, Walsh, Ward, Whelan.

== John Grenham (1993) ==
John Grenham in his 1993 book, Clans and Families of Ireland: The Heritage and Heraldry of Irish Clans and Families, lists the following Irish clan surnames and gives at least a paragraph of information for each: Aherne, Allen, Armstrong, Barrett, Barry, Beatty, Bell, Boyd, Boyle, Bradley, Brady, Breen, Brennan, Browne, Buckley, Burke, Burns, Butler, Byrne, Cahill, Campbell, Carroll, Casey, Cassidy, Clancy, Clarke, Cleary, Coleman, Collins, Conlon, Connolly, Conway, Corcoran, Costello, Coughlan, Craig, Cronin, Crowley, Cullen, Cunningham, Curran, Daly, Delaney, Dempsey, Dillon, Doherty, Dolan, Donnelly, Doran, Dowd, Dowling, Doyle, Driscoll, Duffy, Duggan, Dunne, Dwyer, Egan, Fahy, Farrell, Ferguson, Finnegan, Fitzgerald, Fitzpatrick, Flaherty, Flanagan, Fleming, Flynn, Foley, Ford, Fox, Gallagher, Gorman, Graham, Greene, Griffin, Hall, Hamilton, Hayes, Healy, Hegarty, Hennessy, Henry, Hickey, Higgins, Hogan, Hughes, Hurley, Johnston, Jones, Joyce, Kane, Kavanagh, Keane, Kearney, Keating, Kelleher, Kelly, Kennedy, Kenny, Keogh, Kerr, Kiely, King, Leary, Lee, Lenehan, Lennon, Long, Lynch, Lyons, MacAuley, MacBride, MacCabe, McCann, MacCarthy, MacCormack, MacCullagh, MacDermot, MacDonagh, MacDonald, MacDonnell, MacEvoy, MacGillcuddy, MacGovern, MacGowan, MacGrath, MacGuiness, MacHugh, MacKenna, MacKean, MacLoughlin, MacMahon, MacManus, MacNally, MacNamara, Madden, MacGee, Maguire, Maher, Malone, Martin, Meehan, Molloy, Moloney, Monaghan, Mooney, Moore, Moran, Morgan, Moraiarty, Morris, Mullan, Mulligan, Murphy, Murray, Nolan, O'Brien, O'Callaghan, O'Connell, O'Connor, O'Donnell, O'Donoghue, O'Donovan, O'Grady, O'Hara, O'Keefe, O'Mahony, O'Neill, O'Rourke, O'Shea, O'Sullivan, O'Toole, Patterson, Power, Quigley, Quinn, Redmond, Regan, Reid, Reilly, Riordan, Robinson, Roche, Rogers, Rooney, Ryan, Scott, Sheehan, Sheridan, Smith, Stewart, Sweeney, Tobin, Wallace, Walsh, Whelan, White, Woods.

== See also ==
- Standing Council of Irish Chiefs and Chieftains - organization started in 1991 that recognizes sixteen Chiefs of the Name of the Gaelic nobility of Ireland but not "clans".
- List of Irish kingdoms

== Sources ==
- MacLysaght, Edward (1985). Irish Families - Their Names, Arms and Origins (4th ed.). Blackrock, Dublin: Irish Academic Press. ISBN 0716523647. "The 6th edition includes over 4,000 Irish surnames"
