= Sheean =

Sheean may refer to:

== People ==
- Diana Forbes-Robertson, also known as Diana Sheean, wife of Vincent Sheean (1915–1987), British writer
- Teddy Sheean (1923–1942), sailor in the Royal Australian Navy
- Vincent Sheean (1899–1975), American journalist and novelist

== Other uses ==
- HMAS Sheean (SSG 77), a Collins-class submarine operated by the Royal Australian Navy
- Sheean, Islandeady, a townland in the civil parish of Islandeady, County Mayo, Ireland

== See also ==
- Sheahan, a surname
- Sheehan, a surname
