= Bobby Sheehan =

Bobby Sheehan may refer to:

- Bobby Sheehan (ice hockey) (1949–2026), American National Hockey League center
- Bobby Sheehan (musician) (1968–1999), American musician and songwriter
- Bobby Sheehan (rugby union) (born 2000), Irish rugby union player

== See also ==
- Sheehan (disambiguation)
