= Thomas Sheehan =

Thomas, Tom, or Tommy Sheehan may refer to:

- Thomas Sheehan (philosopher) (born 1941), American academic who has written on Heidegger and Roman Catholicism
- Tom Sheehan (1894–1982), Major League Baseball pitcher and manager
- Tom Sheehan (politician) (1891–1955), Australian politician
- Tommy Sheehan (baseball) (1877–1959), Major League Baseball third baseman
- Tommy Sheehan (Gaelic footballer) (born 1966), Irish Gaelic footballer
- Tommy Sheehan, Survivor: Island of the Idols winner

== See also ==
- Tom Sheahan (born 1968), Irish politician
