= Gary Sheehan =

Gary Sheehan may refer to:

- Gary Sheehan (police officer) (1960–1983), Irish Garda Síochána officer killed during a hostage rescue operation
- Gary Sheehan (ice hockey) (born 1964), Canadian-Swiss ice hockey coach
- Gary Sheehan (racing driver) (born 1968), American racing driver
