= Seon =

Seon may refer to:

- Seon, Switzerland, a municipality in the canton of Aargau
- Seon, a type of arranged marriage in South Korea
- Korean Seon, a Zen school of Korean Buddhism
- Seon (food), steamed vegetable dishes with fillings in Korean cuisine
- Seon (Korean name), including a list of people with the name
- Seon, Anglicisation of Gaelic forename Seán or Seathan (other Anglicisations include Sean, Shane, Eathain, Iain, and Ian, Shaun, and Shawn).
- Seon, like Sheehan, an Anglicised form Gaelic surname Ó Síocháin.
