= William Sheehan =

William or Bill Sheehan may refer to:

- William F. Sheehan (1859–1917), American lawyer and politician from New York
- Joe Sheehan (footballer) (William Joseph Sheehan, 1892–1978), English footballer
- Bill Sheehan (biologist) (born 1947), American biologist and environmental advocate
- Billy Sheehan (born 1953), American musician
- Bill Sheehan (hurler) (born 1997), Irish hurler

== See also ==
- Bill Sheahan (disambiguation)
