= Michael Sheehan (speech coach) =

American speech coach

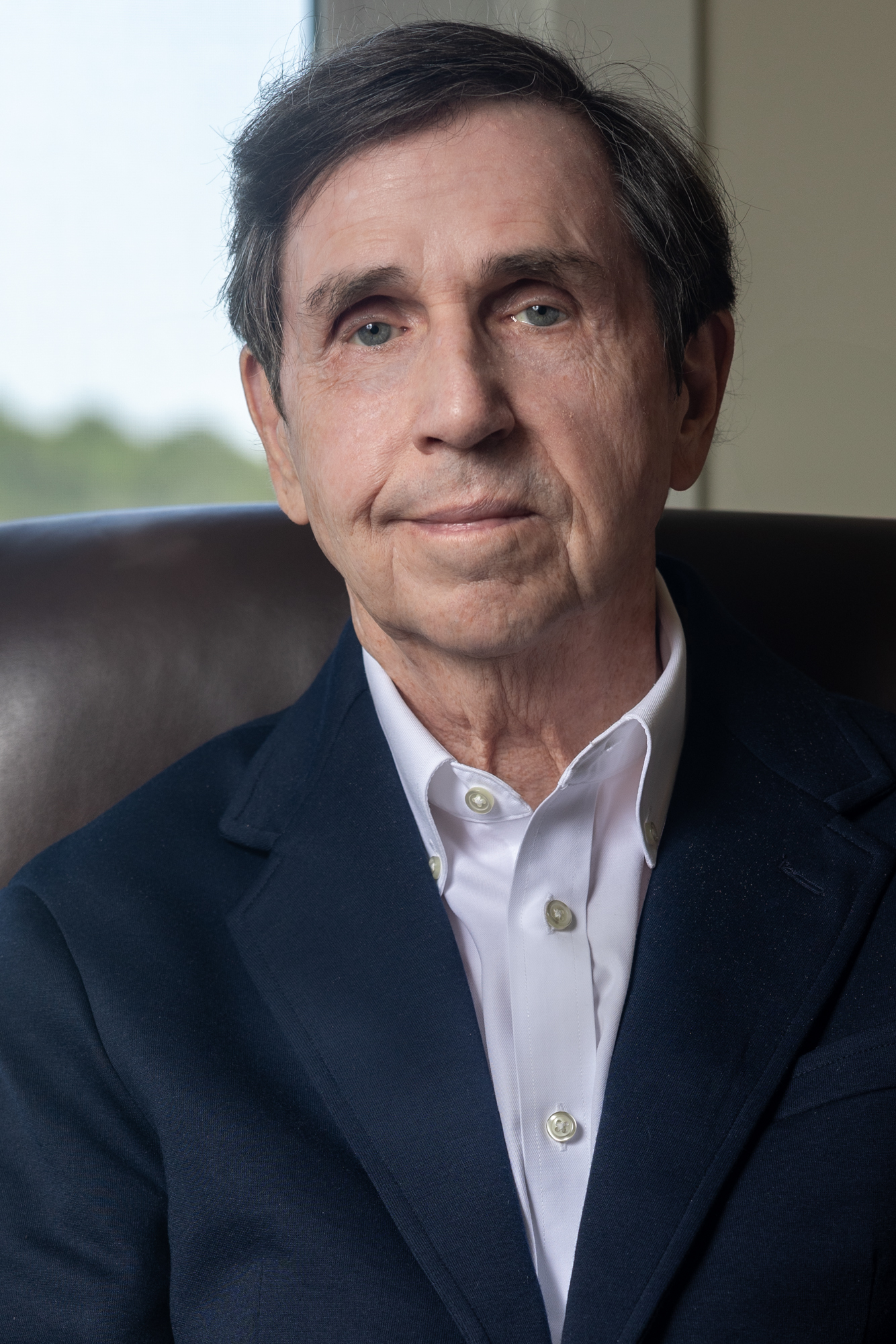
- Sheehan in 2025
- Education: Bachelor of Science in Foreign Service, Walsh School of Foreign Service, Georgetown University (1973); Master of Fine Arts, Yale School of Drama, Yale University (1976)
- Occupations: Communications strategist; speech coach
- Board member of: American Institute for Stuttering; David Geffen School of Drama at Yale University

Michael Sheehan is an American communications strategist and speech coach. Since starting his own consultancy in 1981, Sheehan has worked with many notable Democratic politicians, including three presidents of the United States and Democratic National Convention speakers, as well as companies and executives. He has been on the board of directors of the American Institute for Stuttering as well as the advisory board of his alma mater, the Yale School of Drama.

== Early life and education ==
Sheehan was raised in an Irish Catholic family in New York City. His father worked in sales for a moving company.

From 1965 to 1969, Sheehan attended Xavier High School, where he was a captain of the debate team and played tennis. Sheehan was among the winners of New York state's speech and debate championships during his sophomore and junior years. He changed his focus to drama during his senior year.

In 1969, Sheehan enrolled at Georgetown University, where drama remained his primary interest in part to help him overcome a childhood stutter. He graduated from the Walsh School of Foreign Service and was accepted to the Georgetown University Law Center in 1973. However, he declined to attend law school after he was also accepted to the Yale School of Drama the same year. Sheehan's fellow students included Meryl Streep and Sigourney Weaver. He received speech therapy for the first time for his stutter from the Yale Health Service and received his Master of Fine Arts degree in 1976.

== Career ==
Sheehan is a communications strategist and speech coach. He began his career in Washington, D.C., working as an associate producer at the Folger Theater Group, part of the Folger Shakespeare Library. Sheehan later produced plays with the Folger at the John F. Kennedy Center for the Performing Arts, including the musical Charlie and Algernon which he helped transfer to Broadway. His proximity to Capitol Hill led him to begin coaching members of the U.S. Congress. Sheehan started his own consultancy in 1981. He has consulted for many notable Democratic politicians, including U.S. presidents Bill Clinton, Barack Obama, and Joe Biden, vice president Al Gore, senators Hillary Clinton, Lloyd Bentsen, and John Kerry, governor Ann Richards, and others such as John F. Kennedy Jr. Between 1988 and 2024, Sheehan has also coached every presidential and vice presidential debates series as well as prime time speakers for every Democratic National Convention. Outside of politics, he has consulted for many notable companies and organizations, including the chief executive officers of many large corporations.

== Personal life ==
Sheehan and his wife Riki have two sons. He suffered from a stroke in August 2003 and received cognitive therapy before fully recovering and returning to work in January 2004.

Sheehan's lifelong experience with stuttering led him to receive a leadership award from the American Institute for Stuttering. He has served on the organization's board of directors. Sheehan received an award from the Voice Foundation, which focuses on voice education, medicine, and science, in 2012. He also serves on the advisory board of the David Geffen School of Drama at Yale University.

== See also ==
- List of Georgetown University alumni
- List of stutterers
- List of Yale University people
