= John Sheehan =

John Sheehan may refer to:

- John Sheehan (journalist) (1812–1882), Irish writer and barrister
- John Sheehan (New Zealand politician) (1844–1885), New Zealand politician
- John Sheehan (Australian politician) (1916–1984), Labor member of the Parliament of Victoria
- John C. Sheehan (1915–1992), American chemist
- John Francis Sheehan (1910–1942), United States Navy sailor
- John J. Sheehan (born 1940), United States Marine Corps general
- John Joe Sheehan (1929–2020), Irish Gaelic footballer
- Jack Sheehan (baseball) (1893–1987), American baseball player
- Jack Sheehan (footballer) (1890–1933), Australian footballer
- John Sheehan (actor) (1885–1952), American film and vaudeville actor
- John C. Sheehan (?–1913), leader of Tammany Hall
- John Sheehan (Liverpool politician) (1885–1972), Alderman and Lord Mayor of Liverpool

== See also ==
- John Sheahan
