= Sheehan (disambiguation) =

Sheehan is a surname. It may also refer to:

- Sheehan Islands, Mac. Robertson Land, Antarctica
- Sheehan Glacier, Victoria Land, Antarctica
- Sheehan Mesa, Victoria Land, Antarctica
- 16037 Sheehan, an asteroid
- USS Sheehan (DE-541), a United States Navy destroyer escort launched in 1943, but never completed

== See also ==
- Sheehan's syndrome, a syndrome affecting the pituitary gland
