= MS Combi Dock III =

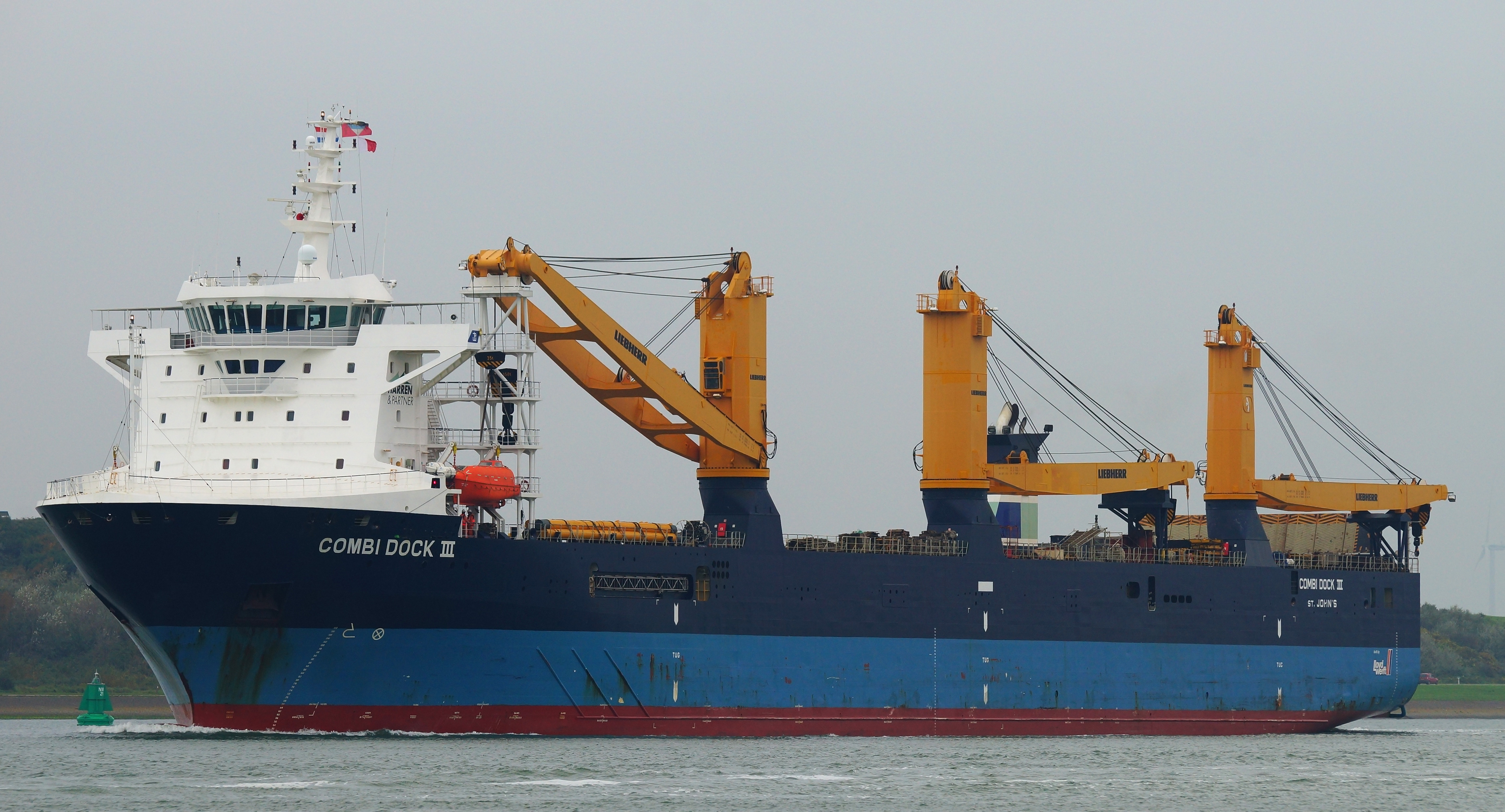

History

Antigua and Barbuda
- Name: Combi Dock III
- Operator: Harren & Partner, Bremen, Germany
- Laid down: 2008
- Completed: 2009
- In service: 2009
- Status: Currently in service
- Notes: Call sign: V2PX8; IMO number: 9432828; MMSI number: 305351000

General characteristics
- Type: Cargo ship
- Tonnage: 10,608 tons (deadweight tonnage), 17,341 gross tons (gross tonnage)
- Length: 169.4 m (556 ft)
- Beam: 25.73 m (84.4 ft)
- Draft: 6.2 m (20 ft) (average)
- Propulsion: 2x MAN B&W 8L32/4CR - 4 stroke 8 cylinder diesel engine 8.960 kW
- Speed: 19.3 knots (36 km/h) (maximum); 11.2 knots (21 km/h) (average)

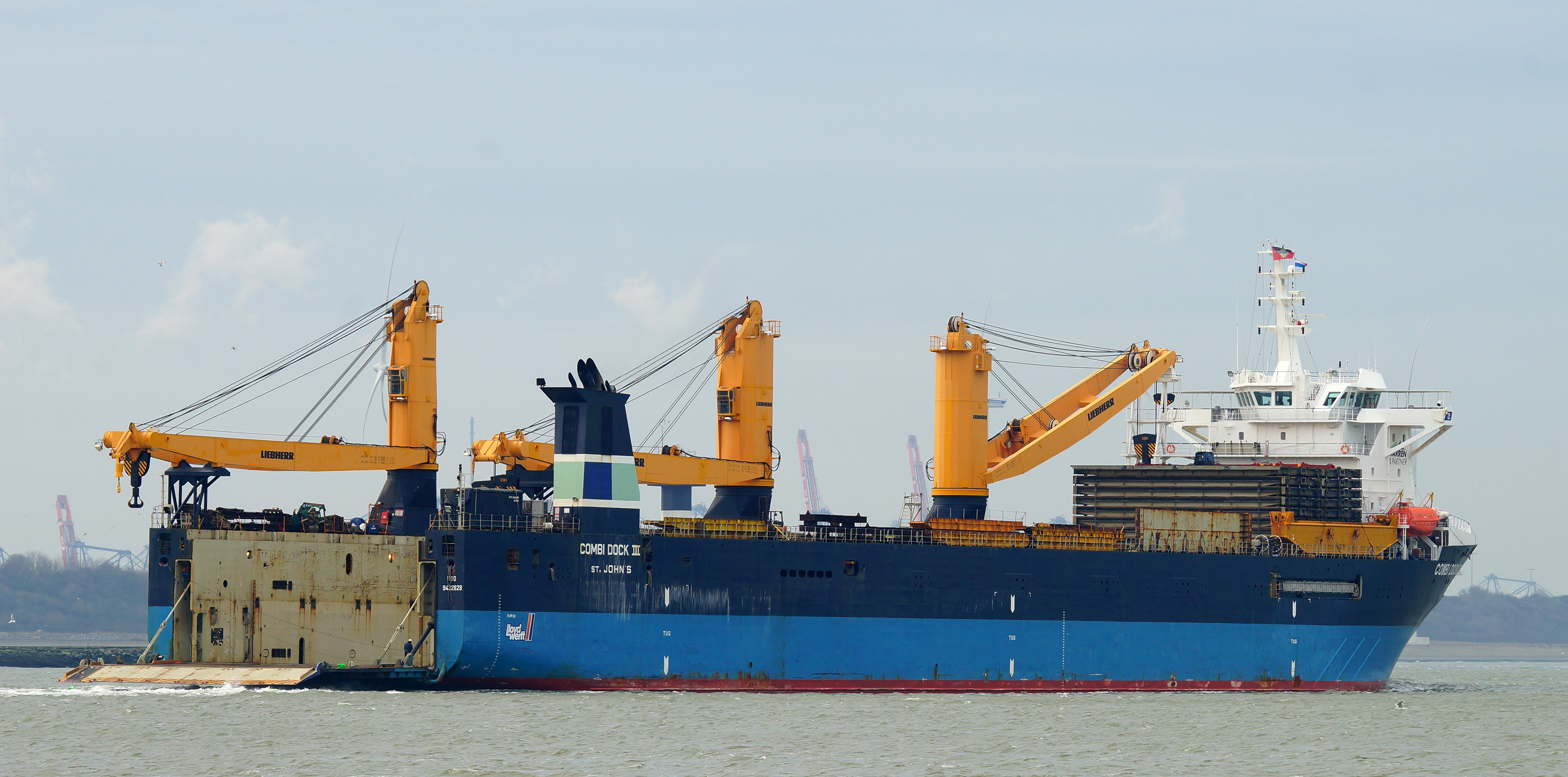
Combi Dock III

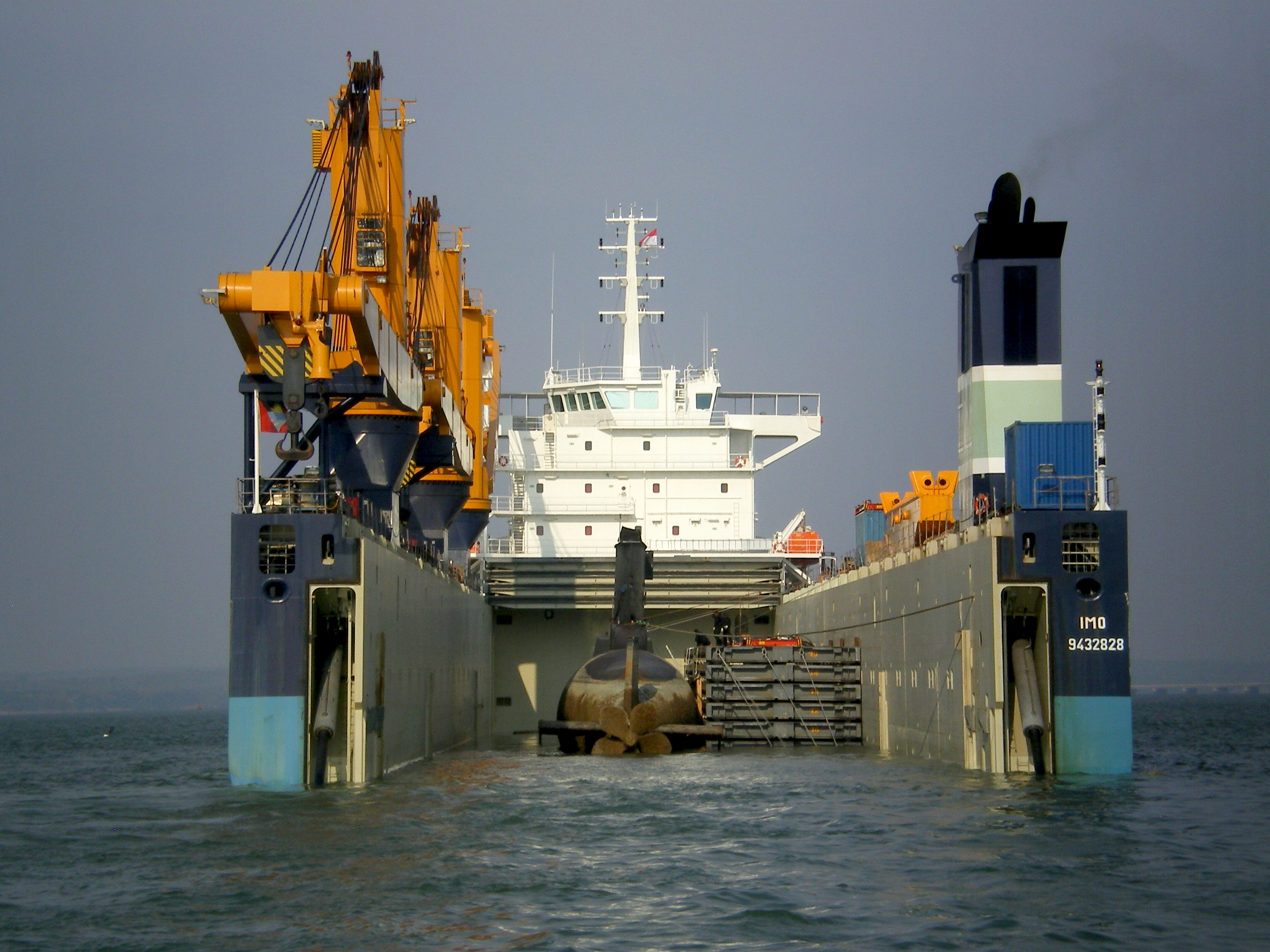
Combi Dock III loading a submarine

MS Combi Dock III is a semi-submersible heavy-lift ship, a specialized cargo vessel of Harren & Partner, Bremen. The vessel belongs to the Combi Dock Type and has a sister ship Combi Dock I, both vessels were built by Lloyd Werft Bremerhaven, Germany in 2008–2009 after the hulls had been completed by Christ S.A., Gdansk.

Combi Dock Type vessels have Lo-Lo / Ro-Ro / Flo-Flo (Lift on - Lift off / Roll on - Roll off / Float on - Float off) capabilities with a stern ramp. Combi Dock III is equipped with two cranes able to lift each 350 tons and one crane to lift 200 tons for a combined maximum lift of 700 tons. It has a cargo hold of 132 x 18 x 9.4 meters and can sail with an open hatch.

== History ==
On 16 July 2013, during a storm, the Combi Dock III broke free of her moorings and damaged the submarine HMAS Sheean (SSG 77) at the Australian Marine Complex. Combi Dock III was impounded by the Australian government until 13 September, when the owners agreed to pay for the damage.

In July–August 2017, the Combi Dock III transported the sailing vessel Peking for repairs and permanent display from New York City to Germany.

== Combi Dock series ==
Combi Dock III is the third ship of the Combi Dock series. Combi Dock II and IV have been converted into offshore support vessels and renamed.

Combi Dock Vessels
Name	Builder / Building Nr.	IMO Nr.	Owner/Operator	Year built	Later names	Status
Combi Dock I	Lloyd-Werft / 112	9400473	Harren & Partner	20. Januar 2008	-	In use
Combi Dock II	Lloyd-Werft / 113	9400485	BIT Baltic Investment & Trading Pte	18. August 2008	2014 → Blue Giant	In use
Combi Dock III	Lloyd-Werft / 114	9432828	Harren & Partner	17. Februar 2009	-	In use
Combi Dock IV	Lloyd-Werft / 115	9509970		7. Januar 2010	2014 → OIG Giant II, 2017 → Ocean Jazz/Industrial Jazz	In use
