= Bill Sheahan =

Bill Sheahan may refer to:

- Bill Sheahan (umpire) (born 1953), Australian Test cricket match umpire
- Bill Sheahan (politician) (1895–1975), Australian politician

== See also ==
- William Sheehan (disambiguation)
