= Michael Sheehan =

Michael or Mike Sheehan may refer to:

- Michael Sheehan (coadjutor archbishop of Sydney) (1870–1945), Gaelic author aka Michéal Ó Síothcháin
- Michael Sheehan (archbishop of Santa Fe) (1939–2023), American Roman Catholic prelate
- Michael Sheehan (politician), Irish independent politician
- Michael A. Sheehan (1955–2018), Ambassador at Large for Counter-terrorism and Deputy Commissioner for Terrorism, NYPD
- Michael Sheehan (actor), American voice actor, in animations, e.g. Fred and Barney Meet the Thing, The Flintstone Comedy Show and Spider-Man
- Michael Sheehan (hurler), Irish hurler, see Cork Minor Hurling Team 1988
- Michael Sheehan (speech coach), American communications strategist
