= Vincent Sheehan =

Vincent Sheehan or Vince Sheehan may refer to:

- Vince Sheehan (rugby league, South Sydney) (died 1926), Australian rugby league footballer
- Vince Sheehan (rugby league, born 1916) (1916–1973), Australian rugby league footballer
- Vincent Sheehan (producer), Australian filmmaker

== See also ==
- Vincent Sheean (1899–1975), American journalist and novelist
