= American Institute for Stuttering =

American nonprofit organization

- Founded: 1998
- Founder: Catherine Otto Montgomery
- Type: 501(c)(3) public charity
- Location(s): New York City, U.S. & Atlanta, U.S.
- Services: Stuttering therapy, financial assistance for speech therapy, clinical training,
- Employees: 10
- Website: www.stutteringtreatment.org

The American Institute for Stuttering is an American nonprofit organization that provides universally affordable speech therapy to people who stutter. The organization, legally known as The American Institute for Stuttering Treatment and Professional Training (AIS), was founded in 1998 by speech-language pathologist Catherine Otto Montgomery in New York, New York. The current clinical director is speech-language pathologist Heather Grossman, PhD. AIS currently has offices in New York City, Atlanta, GA, and Los Angeles, CA.

The organization provides stuttering therapy to children and adults, financial assistance to help make therapy affordable, and clinical training to speech-language pathologists seeking specialized knowledge in the treatment of stuttering.

== Board of directors ==
The members of the board of directors are:

- Chairman Eric Dinallo – Debevoise & Plimpton LLP
- Treasurer Nolan Russo, Jr. – Capital Printing Corporation
- Vice Chair Sander Flaum – Flaum Partners, Inc.
- Secretary Z. Logan Gould – Maynard, Cooper & Gale, LLP
- Aaron Graff – Ferring Pharmaceuticals, Inc
- Amish Shah – Goodwin Procter LLP
- Anthony Hooper – Biotech
- Austin Pendleton – actor, director, and writer
- Barry Blaustein – writer, director, producer
- Carly Simon – singer/Songwriter
- Chris Coleridge – Hum Nutrition Inc.
- Clarence Page – Journalist
- David Esseks – Allen & Overy, LLP
- David Resnicow – Resnicow and associates
- Emily Blunt – actress
- John Stossel – Fox Business
- Julie M. Henson – Taft
- Kenyatta Bolden – Prudential Financial
- Kenyon Martin – NBA player
- Kerri Chase – McDermott Will & Emery LLP
- Laureen Coyne – Risk Management Consultant
- Norbert Lewandowski – Lewandowski & Company
- Rachel Cortese – Speech Language Pathologist, Behavior Therapist
- Susan Reichardt – Surface Transportation Board
- Will Blodgett – Fairstead
- William D. Marsillo – Boies Schiller Flexner LLP
