= Cornelius Sheehan =

Cornelius Sheehan could refer to:

- Connie Sheehan (1889–1950), Irish hurler
- Neil Sheehan (Cornelius Mahoney Sheehan, 1936–2021), American journalist
- Con Sheehan (born 1989), Irish boxer
