= Teddy Sheean =

Royal Australian Navy sailor

Edward "Teddy" Sheean VC
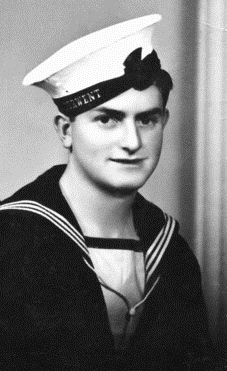
- Teddy Sheean c.1941
- Born: 28 December 1923; Lower Barrington, Tasmania
- Died: 1 December 1942 (aged 18); Timor Sea
- Military career
- Allegiance: Australia
- Branch: Royal Australian Naval Reserve
- Service years: 1941–1942
- Rank: Ordinary Seaman
- Unit: HMAS Armidale
- Conflicts: Second World War; South West Pacific theatre; South-East Asian theatre; Battle of Timor †
- Awards: Victoria Cross for Australia

Edward "Teddy" Sheean, VC (28 December 1923 – 1 December 1942) was a sailor in the Royal Australian Navy during the Second World War. Born in Tasmania, Sheean was employed as a farm labourer when he enlisted in the Royal Australian Naval Reserve in April 1941. Following training at HMAS Derwent and the Flinders Naval Depot, he was posted to Sydney, where he joined the newly commissioned corvette HMAS Armidale in June 1942. Sheean served aboard Armidale as she took part in escort duties along the eastern Australian coast and in New Guinea waters. In October he transferred with the ship to Darwin, where Armidale was tasked with assisting Australian operations in Timor.

On 29 November 1942, Armidale set out for an operation to Betano, Timor, along with HMAS Castlemaine. The two ships were attacked by Japanese aircraft along the way, and were subsequently late in arriving at their destination, missing a planned rendezvous with HMAS Kuru. While returning to Darwin, the pair encountered Kuru south of Betano and it was decided by Castlemaine's commanding officer—as the senior officer—that Armidale and Kuru should make for Betano. The two ships took different routes to Betano, during which both vessels came under aerial assault. During a subsequent confrontation with thirteen Japanese aircraft on 1 December, Armidale was struck by two torpedoes and a bomb, and began to sink; the order to abandon ship was given. After helping to free a life-raft, Sheean was wounded by two bullets. He made his way to the aft Oerlikon 20 mm cannon and began to fire on the Japanese aircraft to protect those in the water. Sheean managed to shoot down one of the Japanese bombers, but was killed when Armidale sank. Many of the survivors credited their lives to Sheean and he was posthumously mentioned in despatches, this award was later cancelled on 1 December 2020 when upgraded to the Victoria Cross for Australia.

Consideration was given to awarding Sheean the Victoria Cross for Australia (VC) and, in 1999, the RAN submarine HMAS Sheean was named in his honour. An inquiry in 2013 recommended that he not be awarded the VC. A 2019 inquiry recommended in favour of the award, but was rejected by the Government. Another inquiry held during 2020 recommended that Sheean be awarded the VC, and this was accepted by the Government. Queen Elizabeth II approved the award on 12 August 2020.

== Early life ==
Sheean was born in Lower Barrington, Tasmania, on 28 December 1923, the youngest of fourteen children to James Sheean, a labourer, and his wife Mary Jane (née Broomhall). Soon after his birth, the Sheean family moved to Latrobe, where he was educated at St Patricks Catholic Primary School. Following the completion of his schooling, Sheean gained casual employment working on several farms in the vicinity of Latrobe and Merseylea.

== Second World War ==
On 21 April 1941, Sheean enlisted in the Royal Australian Naval Reserve. He had followed in the steps of five of his brothers who had already joined the armed forces—four in the Australian Army and one in the Royal Australian Navy—for service in the Second World War. Sheean was initially posted to the Hobart naval base HMAS Derwent for training, where he gained a period of seafaring experience aboard HMAS Coombar, an auxiliary minesweeper, from 17 to 31 December. On finishing his initial training course, Sheean was attached to the Flinders Naval Depot in Western Port, Victoria, for further instruction from 11 February 1942.

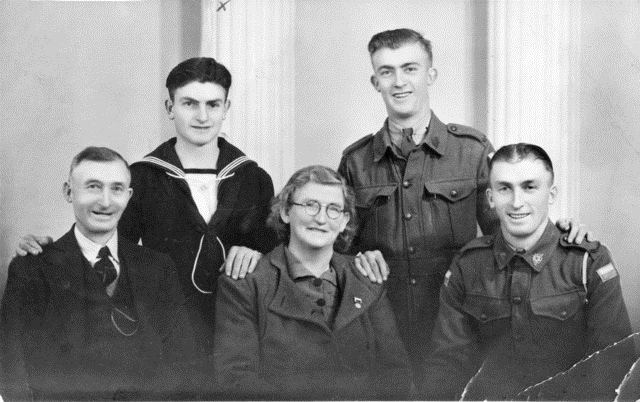
Members of the Sheean family c.1941. L to R, back row: Edward (Teddy); Frederick. Front row: James (father); Mary (mother); William.

Completing his course at the Flinders Naval Depot, Sheean was posted to the Garden Island naval base HMAS Penguin in Sydney Harbour on 11 May. During his time with Penguin, he was berthed on HMAS Kuttabul, a Sydney ferry requisitioned for use as a barracks ship. Granted a period of leave later that month, he returned home to Tasmania. While he was on leave, Japanese midget submarines attacked Sydney Harbour and sank Kuttabul on 31 May. Returning to Sydney eleven days after the raid, Sheean joined the newly commissioned Bathurst-class corvette HMAS Armidale as an Oerlikon anti-aircraft gun loader.

Leaving Sydney Harbour in late August 1942, Sheean served aboard Armidale as she carried out "relatively uneventful" escort duties along the North Queensland, Port Moresby and Milne Bay coasts over the subsequent two months. During October, Armidale was ordered to Darwin. Setting sail, she arrived on 7 November and was detailed to assist in the Australian operations in Timor.

=== Sinking of Armidale ===
On 24 November 1942, the evacuation of the 2/2nd Australian Independent Company from Timor along with 150 Portuguese people was approved by the Allied Land Forces Headquarters. In response to this, Commodore Cuthbert Pope, the Naval Officer-in-Charge Darwin, organised an operation utilising HMA Ships Kuru, Castlemaine and Armidale. The operation was to involve the three ships undertaking two voyages each, the first to take place on the night of 30 November/1 December and involve a trip to Betano, Timor, in which the ships were to land 50 fresh Dutch guerrillas in the area along with supplies, and simultaneously withdraw 190 Dutch soldiers as well as the 150 Portuguese refugees. The second excursion was to be carried out on the night of 4/5 December, and entail the extraction of the 2/2nd Independent Company.

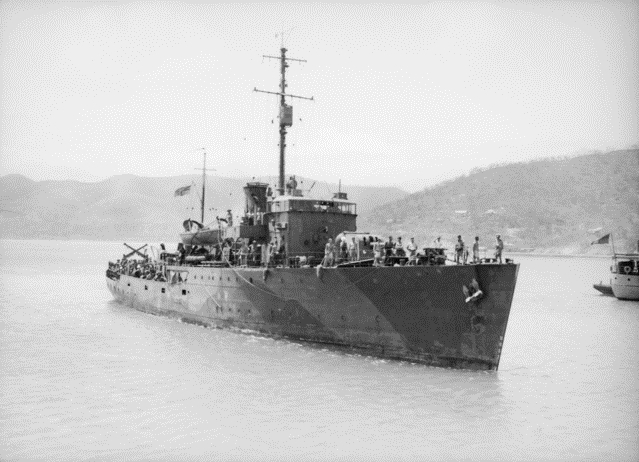
HMAS Armidale in Port Moresby harbour c. September 1942.

At 22:30 on 28 November 1942, Kuru set sail for Betano. Kuru was scheduled to arrive at approximately 20:30 on 30 November, where she was to unload the supplies on board and embark the Portuguese refugees, which were to transfer to Castlemaine once she arrived along with Armidale two hours later. However, Kuru hit bad weather during her voyage and arrived at Betano three hours late. Armidale—with two Dutch Army officers, 61 Netherlands East Indies troops and three Australian Army soldiers aboard—and Castlemaine set sail from Darwin at 01:42 on 29 November. At approximately 09:15 on 30 November, while 190 kilometres (100 nmi) from their destination, the two ships were attacked by a single Japanese aircraft. Having missed with several bombs, the aircraft flew off in the direction of Timor an hour later. Fearing that their discovery by this aircraft would jeopardise the mission, Castlemaine's Commanding Officer, Lieutenant Commander Philip Sullivan, ordered evasive action and signalled Darwin for further orders. A signal returned decreeing that the operation must proceed and a party of fighter aircraft were to be dispatched as protective cover.

Continuing in their voyage, Armidale and Castlemaine were attacked twice more by air, each time by a formation of bombers that bombed and machine-gunned the ships. Despite this, neither ship suffered damage or casualties and both arrived at Betano at 03:30 on 1 December, however there was no sign of Kuru. Having made sure that Kuru was not in the bay, the two corvettes decided to abandon the mission and sailed south in order to return to Darwin. Kuru's commanding officer, Lieutenant John Grant, had loaded 77 of the Portuguese refugees as well as one critically injured Australian soldier on board the ship and set sail at around 02:00 on 1 December from Betano, fearing he had missed the rendezvous with the other two ships. While approximately 110 kilometres (59 nmi) south of Betano, Armidale and Castlemaine sighted Kuru, and the three ships closed by dawn.

During the attack a plane had been brought down and for this the credit went to Ordinary Seaman Teddy Sheean. Teddy died, but none of us who survived, I am sure, will ever forget his gallant deed ... When the order 'Abandon ship' was given, he made for the side, only to be hit twice by the bullets of an attacking Zero. None of us will ever know what made him do it, but he went back to his gun, strapped himself in, and brought down a Jap plane, still firing as he disappeared beneath the waves.

— Ordinary Seaman Russel Caro

Following the transfer of passengers from Kuru to Castlemaine, the former received orders that she was to return to Betano that evening "and do the job tonight". At this time, a formation of Japanese aircraft was spotted and Kuru sailed for cover. Assessing the situation, Sullivan—as senior officer—decided that Armidale would accompany Kuru in order to unload the former's passengers at Betano while Castlemaine returned to Darwin. Armidale and Kuru assumed separate routes to Betano, and at approximately 13:00 Armidale was attacked by a party of five Japanese bombers; the explosives, however, fell wide of their target. At 13:58, Armidale reported that she was under attack from "nine bombers, four fighters" over the Timor Sea.

Armidale undertook evasive action, manoeuvring frantically to avoid the aerial attack. However, at 15:15, the vessel was struck by two air-launched torpedoes, one hitting her port side and the other colliding with the engineering spaces, before a bomb exploded aft. Armidale listed sharply to port at this stage, and the order was given to abandon ship. As the crew leapt into the sea, they were strafed by the attacking aircraft. Sheean—after assisting to free a life-raft—was hit by two bullets from one of the aircraft, wounding him in the chest and back. Scrambling across the deck, he strapped himself into the aft Oerlikon 20 mm cannon and began shooting at the fighters in an effort to protect some of the sailors already in the sea. Subject to the fire from Sheean's Oerlikon, the Japanese aircraft were kept at bay and were unable to effectively strafe those in the water.

With Armidale rapidly sinking, Sheean continued to fire and managed to shoot down one of the Japanese bombers. He damaged a further two aircraft before Armidale's stern was engulfed by the sea. Despite this, Sheean maintained his fire as the water rose above his feet, and remained firing as he "disappeared beneath the waves". Sheean's crewmates later testified to witnessing tracers rising from beneath the water's surface as Sheean was dragged under.

== Legacy ==
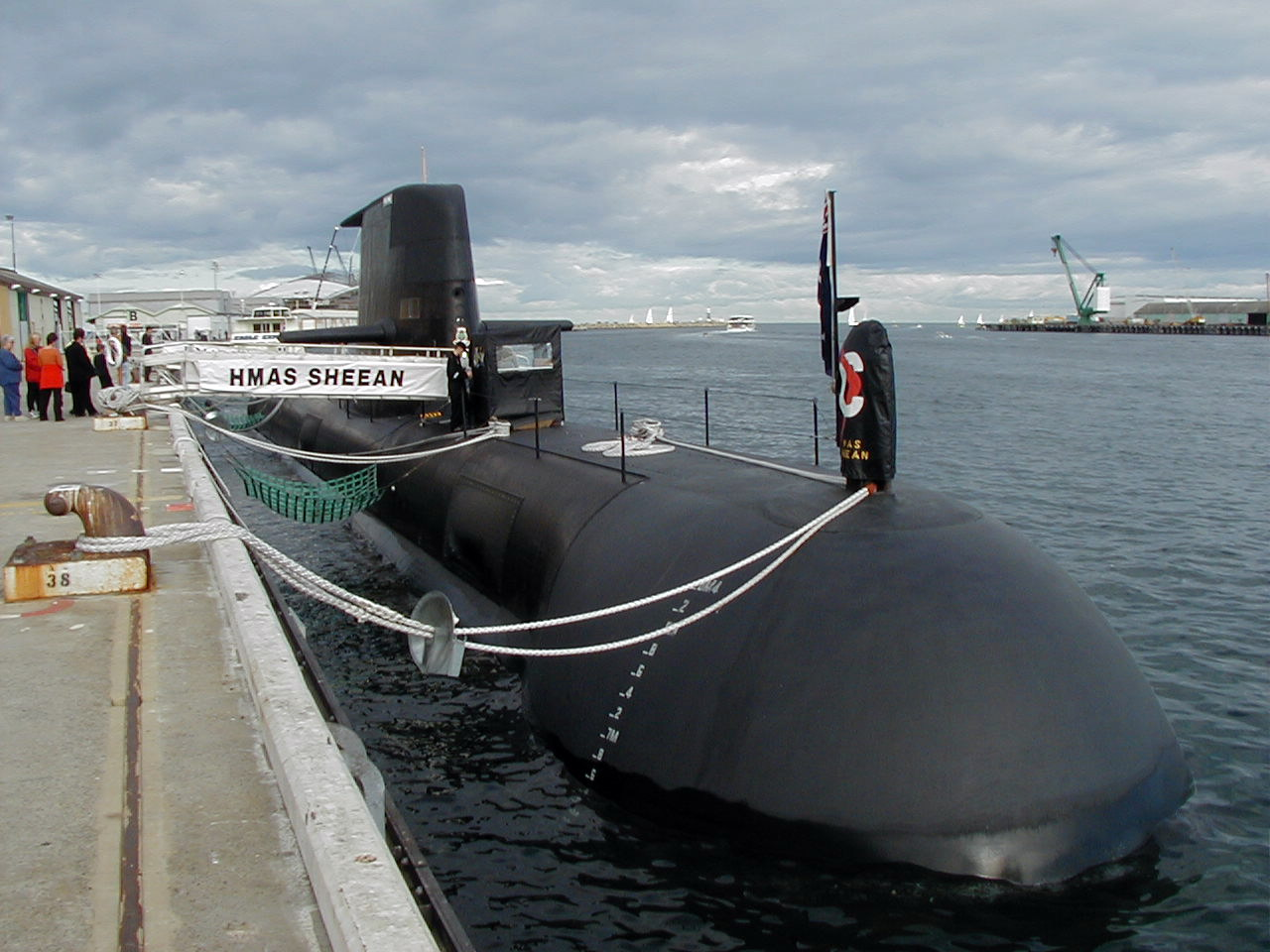
HMAS Sheean at Fremantle, Western Australia

Sheean was among 100 of the original 149 people on board HMAS Armidale at the time of the attack who were killed during the ship's sinking and its aftermath. Many of the survivors attributed their lives to Sheean. For his "bravery and devotion when HMAS Armidale was lost", Sheean's actions were recognised with a posthumous Mention in Despatches, awarded on the recommendation of Armidale's commanding officer, Lieutenant Commander David Richards, and announced in a supplement to The London Gazette on 29 June 1943. However, many held the opinion that Sheean's gallantry, devotion to duty and self-sacrifice were worthy of the Victoria Cross, with author Robert Macklin stating his "actions were in the highest tradition of the Australian military" and comparing them with those of Vietnam War Victoria Cross recipient Kevin Wheatley.

On 1 May 1999, the submarine HMAS Sheean was launched by Ivy Hayes—sister of Teddy Sheean—named in the ordinary seaman's honour. Sheean was subsequently commissioned into the Royal Australian Navy on 23 February 2001, and was the first Royal Australian Navy vessel to be named in honour of a naval rating. Carrying the motto "Fight On", the vessel was one of six Collins-class submarines entered into service. A painting depicting Sheean's final moments is held by the Australian War Memorial. His home town of Latrobe commemorates his life via the Sheean Walk and Teddy Sheean Memorial, opened in 1992. In 2003, the Australian Navy Cadets established a training ship at Tewantin, Queensland, called NTS Sheean in his honour.

=== Victoria Cross for Australia ===
In 2001 a Bill was introduced into the Australian Senate to have three awards of the Victoria Cross for Australia made, one being to Sheean. The Bill came as part of a campaign by the then-leader of the Australian Labor Party and Federal Opposition, Kim Beazley, to secure more rights for war veterans. However, it was subsequently rejected by the Liberal Government.

In 2011, at the direction of the Parliamentary Secretary for Defence, Senator David Feeney, the Defence Honours and Awards Appeals Tribunal opened an inquiry into thirteen cases of unresolved recognition for past acts of gallantry. Among the group were eleven naval personnel, including Sheean. Known as the 'Valour Inquiry', the Tribunal was directed to determine if the individuals were unduly overlooked for recognition at the time of their actions and, if so, whether late awards were appropriate. The inquiry lasted two years and included 166 submissions from 125 individuals and organisations, before the Tribunal reported its findings in January 2013. In the case of Sheean, the Tribunal found that there was no manifest injustice with the award of the Mention in Despatches, and that there was no new evidence to support the consideration of Sheean for the Victoria Cross for Australia. If Sheean had lived, they reported, he might have been recommended for either the Conspicuous Gallantry Medal or the Distinguished Service Medal instead, but neither medal could be awarded posthumously in 1942. The Tribunal recommended that the RAN perpetuate the use of Sheean as the name of a major combatant vessel.

The Defence Honours and Awards Appeals Tribunal panel conducted an inquiry during 2019 to consider whether Sheean should be awarded the Victoria Cross. It recommended in July that year that he be awarded the medal. This recommendation was rejected by Minister for Defence Linda Reynolds in May 2020 on the grounds that the panel had not presented any new evidence to support its recommendation. Reynolds' decision was endorsed by Prime Minister Scott Morrison. Mark Sullivan, the head of the Defence Honours and Awards Appeals Tribunal subsequently wrote to Reynolds to complain that she had misrepresented the panel's findings and misled the Senate. Sullivan stated in his letter that the panel had found new evidence to support its recommendation despite not being required to do so. In response to Sullivan's letter, Tasmanian Veterans Affairs Minister Guy Barnett and federal Senator Jacqui Lambie called for the decision to not award the medal to be reconsidered. Federal Leader of the Opposition Anthony Albanese also wrote that Sheean should be awarded the Victoria Cross. The Chief of the Defence Force General Angus Campbell strongly advised the government to not award Sheean the medal.

In June 2020, Morrison commissioned another expert panel to examine whether Sheean should be awarded the Victoria Cross. On 10 August 2020, Morrison accepted the findings of the panel and recommended the Queen posthumously award Sheean the Victoria Cross for Australia. The Queen approved the award on 12 August. An investiture ceremony was held on 1 December 2020 at Government House in Canberra. Governor-General General David Hurley presented the award to Sheean's nephew, Garry Ivory. Sheean's medal was the first VC awarded to a Royal Australian Navy crew member.
