= Bobby Sheehan (rugby union) =

Irish rugby union player

- Born: 23 June 2000 (age 26)
- School: Clongowes Wood College
- University: University College Dublin
- Notable relative: Dan Sheehan (brother)

Rugby union career
- Position: Hooker
- Current team: Leinster Rugby
Senior career
Years	Team	Apps	(Points)
2025-	Leinster		

Bobby Sheehan (born 23 June 2000) is an Irish professional rugby union footballer who plays for Leinster Rugby. His preferred position is hooker.

== Club career ==
Sheehan attended Clongowes Wood College. A hooker, he played for University College Dublin in the top flight of the All-Ireland League (AIL), captaining the club from 2022.

He played for Lansdowne prior to joining Leinster Rugby on a temporary contract in 2025. He was named amongst the replacements for the senior Leinster team for the first time for their match against Zebre in the United Rugby Championship on 25 October 2025, making his debut in the 60th minute in a 50–26 win.

== International career ==
Sheehan was a member of the Ireland U20 squad that started playing the U20 Six Nations Championship that year before the tournament was suspended due to the COVID-19 pandemic. In 2024, he played for the Ireland Club XV.

== Personal life ==
He is the brother of fellow Leinster rugby union player Dan Sheehan. Their father, Barry, played for UCD in the 1980s and 1990s and their grandfather, Denis Shaw, also played rugby union for Leinster in the 1950s. He trained as an accountant.
