= Spencer Sheehan =

American attorney (born 1978/79)

Spencer Sheehan (born 1978-1979) is an American attorney best known for filing class action lawsuits against major food corporations in the name of consumer protection. He lives in Great Neck, New York. Sheehan's lawsuits generally accuse companies of having misleading packaging. In 2023, he had filed over 500 such legal challenges. In 2021, NPR attributed him with "almost single-handedly caused a historic spike in the number of class action lawsuits against food and beverage companies." These have included lawsuits against the maker of Pop-Tarts, alleging that their 'Strawberry' flavor was deceptively labeled, and over 120 lawsuits specifically focused on 'vanilla' products that contain minimal actual vanilla.

Sheehan was born on and grew up in Long Island, New York. His parents worked as a speech therapist and a carpenter. He attended Georgetown University as an undergraduate, studying history, earned a master's degree in international relations from Johns Hopkins University, and a JD from the Fordham University School of Law. Sheehan opened his own law practice in 2013. In 2015, Sheehan represented Bernhard Goetz in an eviction case. He began filing large numbers of class action lawsuits in 2017. Some judges have criticized Sheehan for filing excessive cases.
