= Dan Sheehan (rugby union) =

Irish rugby union player

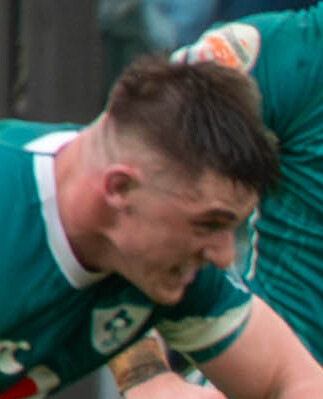
- Sheehan in 2025
- Full name: Dan Patrick Sheehan
- Born: 17 September 1998 (age 28) Dublin, Ireland
- Height: 1.91 m (6 ft 3 in)
- Weight: 111 kg (245 lb; 17 st 7 lb)
- School: Clongowes Wood College
- University: Trinity College Dublin

Rugby union career
- Position(s): Hooker, Number 8
- Current team: Leinster
Senior career
Years	Team	Apps	(Points)
2020–	Leinster	92	(265)
- Correct as of 06 November 2026
International career
Years	Team	Apps	(Points)
2018	Ireland U20	5	(5)
2021–	Ireland	43	(95)
2025	British & Irish Lions	3	(10)
- Correct as of 21 November 2026

Dan Patrick Sheehan (born 17 September 1998) is an Irish professional rugby union player who plays as a hooker and more rarely as a number 8 for United Rugby Championship club Leinster and the Ireland national team.

== Early life ==
Before playing professionally, Sheehan was a Leinster Schools Senior Cup semi-finalist with Clongowes Wood College in 2016. He then went to Trinity College and played on their rugby team in the All-Ireland League. He has also played in the All-Ireland League for Lansdowne.

== Club career ==
Sheehan signed his first professional contract for Leinster in June 2020. He made his Leinster debut in October 2020 in Round 3 of the 2020–21 Pro14 against Zebre, scoring two tries. In June 2022, he was named Leinster's 2021–22 Men's Young Player of the Year. Sheehan was named to the 2022–23 URC Elite XV of the year.

In January 2025, he returned from a six month injury to score two tries on first appearance back for Leinster in a 36–12 win over the Stormers in the URC. In April 2025, he scored a hat-trick of tries during a 41–17 victory over Ulster. In June 2025, he scored two tries in the URC semi finals during a 37–19 victory over Glasgow Warriors. The following week he started the final as Leinster beat the Bulls 32–7 to win the 2024–25 United Rugby Championship.

In October 2026, amid injuries to Caelan Doris and Jack Conan, he was named at no.8 ahead of their URC fixture against Munster.

== International career ==
=== Ireland ===
Sheehan made his senior international test debut on 6 November 2021 against Japan at the Aviva Stadium.

In the 2022 Six Nations, Sheehan came off the bench in a win against Wales and played the majority of the defeat to France after Rónan Kelleher came off injured in the 26th minute. Sheehan earned his first start for Ireland in the February 2022 Six Nations match against Italy. In the final match of the 2022 Six Nations, he scored a try and won the player-of-the-match award in a 26–5 victory over Scotland. Sheehan was nominated for the 2022 World Rugby Breakthrough Player of the Year.

On 18 March 2023, Sheehan scored two tries in a player-of-the-match performance against England which clinched the 2023 Six Nations and the Grand Slam.

In 2024, Sheehan won the 2024 Six Nations Championship finishing the tournament as joint top try scorer with five alongside Duhan van der Merwe.

In January 2025, despite just returning from a six month long injury and only one appearance in the URC that season, he was named on the bench for the opening round of the 2025 Six Nations against England. He went on to score a try as they won 27–22. In February 2025, he was named in the starting lineup for the first time during the tournament against Wales and in the absence of Caelan Doris through injury, he also captained the team for the first time. Ireland won the Triple Crown after a 27–18 victory with Sheehan lifting the trophy alongside Doris. On March 15th, Sheehan scored a hat-trick at the Stadio Olimpico in Rome, during a 22–17 victory over Italy. In November 2026, he was named as the starting number 8 against South Africa in light of a back row injury crisis.

=== British & Irish Lions ===
In May 2025, he was selected for the 2025 British & Irish Lions tour to Australia. In July 2025, he scored a try in the first test as the Lions won 29–17. He also scored the first try in the second test as the Lions won 29–26 to secure the series victory. During the third test he was caught engaging in foul play with an illegal challenge to head of Australian player Tom Lynagh. After receiving a four match suspension, he denied the action was illegal and rejected the findings of the citing. Though one of World Rugby's most respected voices, and retired international referee, Nigel Owens outlined the play was dangerous, illegal and deserved to be red carded.

== Career statistics ==
=== List of international tries ===
Number	Position	Points	Tries	Result	Opposition	Venue	Competition	Date	Ref.
1	Hooker	5	1	Won	Argentina	Aviva Stadium	2021 end-of-year rugby union internationals	21 November 2021	
2	Hooker	5	1	Won	Scotland	Aviva Stadium	2022 Six Nations Championship	19 March 2022	
3–4	Hooker	10	2	Won	England	Aviva Stadium	2023 Six Nations Championship	18 March 2023	
5	Hooker	5	1	Won	Scotland	Stade de France	2023 Rugby World Cup	7 October 2023	
6	Hooker	5	1	Won	France	Stade Vélodrome	2024 Six Nations Championship	2 February 2024	
7–8	Hooker	10	2	Won	Italy	Aviva Stadium	2024 Six Nations Championship	11 February 2024	
9	Hooker	5	1	Won	Wales	Aviva Stadium	2024 Six Nations Championship	24 February 2024	
10	Hooker	5	1	Won	Scotland	Aviva Stadium	2024 Six Nations Championship	16 March 2024	
11	Hooker	5	1	Won	England	Aviva Stadium	2025 Six Nations Championship	1 February 2025	
12	Hooker	5	1	Lost	France	Aviva Stadium	2025 Six Nations Championship	8 March 2025	
13–15	Hooker	15	3	Won	Italy	Stadio Olimpico	2025 Six Nations Championship	15 March 2025	
16*	Hooker	5	1	Won	Australia	Lang Park	2025 British & Irish Lions tour to Australia	19 July 2025	
17*	Hooker	5	1	Won	Australia	Melbourne Cricket Ground	2025 British & Irish Lions tour to Australia	26 July 2025	
18	Hooker	5	1	lost	South Africa	Aviva Stadium	2025 end-of-year rugby union internationals	22 November 2025	
19	Hooker	5	1	won	England	Twickenham Stadium	2026 Six Nations Championship	21 February 2026	
20	Hooker	5	1	won	Scotland	Aviva Stadium	2026 Six Nations Championship	14 March 2026	
21	Hooker	5	1	won	Argentina	Aviva Stadium	2026 Nations Championship Northern Hemisphere Series	6 November 2026	

as of 6 November 2026

- denotes* tries scored while playing with the 2025 British & Irish Lions tour to Australia.

== Personal life ==
Sheehan, has a younger brother, Bobby who played hooker for University College Dublin R.F.C. while their grandfather also played rugby for Leinster in the 1950s.
