= HMAS Sheean =

Submarine of the Royal Australian Navy

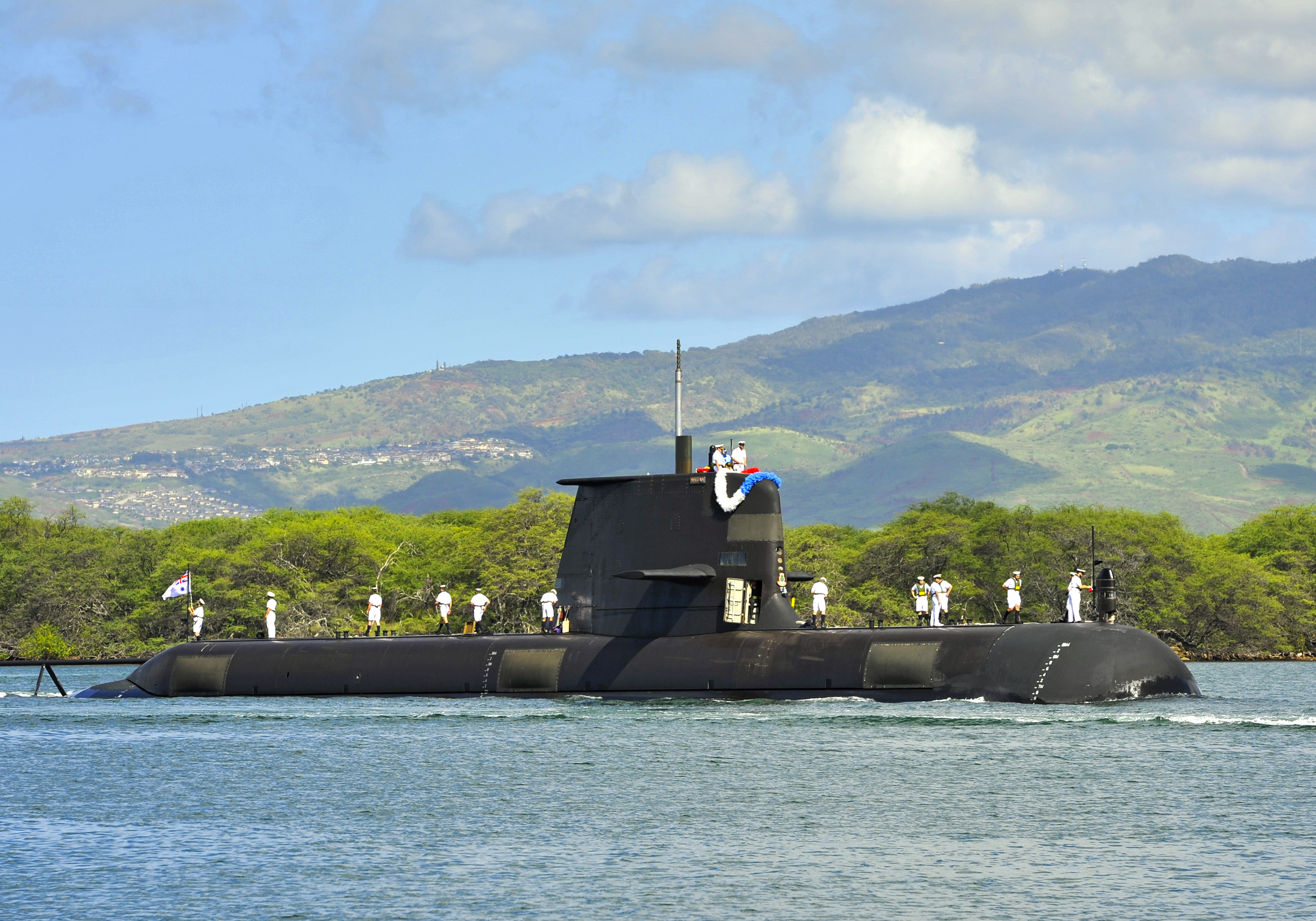
- Sheean at Pearl Harbor in July 2014

History

Australia
- Name: Sheean
- Namesake: Ordinary Seaman Edward "Teddy" Sheean VC
- Builder: Australian Submarine Corporation, Osborne
- Laid down: 17 February 1994
- Launched: 1 May 1999
- Commissioned: 23 February 2001
- Home port: Fleet Base West, Perth
- Motto: "Fight On"
- Status: Active as of 2016
- Badge

General characteristics
- Class & type: Collins-class submarine
- Displacement: 3,051 tonnes (surfaced); 3,353 tonnes (submerged)
- Length: 77.42 m (254.0 ft)
- Beam: 7.8 m (26 ft)
- Draught: 7 m (23 ft) at waterline
- Installed power: 3 × Garden Island-Hedemora HV V18b/15Ub (VB210) 18-cylinder diesel motors, 3 × Jeumont-Schneider generators (1,400 kW, 440-volt DC)
- Propulsion: Main: 1 × Jeumont-Schneider DC motor (7,200 shp), driving 1 × seven-bladed, 4.22 m (13.8 ft) diameter skewback propeller; Emergency: 1 × MacTaggart Scott DM 43006 retractable hydraulic motor
- Speed: 10.5 knots (19.4 km/h; 12.1 mph) (surfaced and snorkel depth); 21 knots (39 km/h; 24 mph) (submerged)
- Range: 11,000 nautical miles (20,000 km; 13,000 mi) at 10 knots (19 km/h; 12 mph) (surfaced); 9,000 nautical miles (17,000 km; 10,000 mi) at 10 knots (19 km/h; 12 mph) (snorkel); 32.6 nautical miles (60.4 km; 37.5 mi) at 21 knots (39 km/h; 24 mph) (submerged); 480 nautical miles (890 km; 550 mi) at 4 knots (7.4 km/h; 4.6 mph) (submerged)
- Endurance: 70 days
- Test depth: Over 180 m (590 ft) (actual depth classified)
- Complement: Originally 42 (plus up to 12 trainees); Increased to 58 in 2009
- Sensors & processing systems: Radar: GEC-Marconi Type 1007 surface search radar; Sonar: Thales Scylla bow and distributed sonar arrays; Thales Karriwarra or Namara towed sonar array; ArgoPhoenix AR-740-US intercept array; Combat system: Modified Raytheon CCS Mk2
- Armament: 6 × 21-inch (530 mm) bow torpedo tubes; Payload: 22 torpedoes, mix of: Mark 48 Mod 7 CBASS torpedoes; UGM-84C Sub-Harpoon anti-ship missiles; Or: 44 Stonefish Mark III mines
- Notes: The sonars and combat system are in the process of being updated across the class, to be completed by 2010. These characteristics represent the updated equipment.

HMAS Sheean (SSG 77) is the fifth of six Collins-class submarines operated by the Royal Australian Navy (RAN).

Named for Ordinary Seaman Edward Sheean VC—the only submarine of the class to be named for an enlisted sailor—the boat was laid down in 1994 and launched in 1999. Sheean and sister boat Dechaineux were modified during construction as part of the "fast track" program—an attempt to fix the problems affecting the Collins class, and put at least two fully operational submarines in service before the last Oberon-class submarine was decommissioned.

== Characteristics ==
The Collins class is an enlarged version of the Västergötland class submarine designed by Kockums. At 77.42 metres (254.0 ft) in length, with a beam of 7.8 metres (26 ft) and a waterline depth of 7 metres (23 ft), displacing 3,051 tonnes when surfaced, and 3,353 tonnes when submerged, they are the largest conventionally powered submarines in the world. The hull is constructed from high-tensile micro-alloy steel, and are covered in a skin of anechoic tiles to minimise detection by sonar. The depth that they can dive to is classified: most sources claim that it is over 180 metres (590 ft),

The submarine is armed with six 21-inch (530 mm) torpedo tubes, and carry a standard payload of 22 torpedoes: originally a mix of Gould Mark 48 Mod 4 torpedoes and UGM-84C Sub-Harpoon, with the Mark 48s later upgraded to the Mod 7 Common Broadband Advanced Sonar System (CBASS) version.

Each submarine is equipped with three Garden Island-Hedemora HV V18b/15Ub (VB210) 18-cylinder diesel engines, which are each connected to a 1,400 kW, 440-volt DC Jeumont-Schneider generator. The electricity generated is stored in batteries, then supplied to a single Jeumont-Schneider DC motor, which provides 7,200 shaft horsepower to a single, seven-bladed, 4.22-metre (13.8 ft) diameter skewback propeller. The Collins class has a speed of 10.5 knots (19.4 km/h; 12.1 mph) when surfaced and at snorkel depth, and can reach 21 knots (39 km/h; 24 mph) underwater. The submarines have a range of 11,000 nautical miles (20,000 km; 13,000 mi) at 10 knots (19 km/h; 12 mph) when surfaced, 9,000 nautical miles (17,000 km; 10,000 mi) at 10 knots (19 km/h; 12 mph) at snorkel depth. When submerged completely, a Collins-class submarine can travel 32.6 nautical miles (60.4 km; 37.5 mi) at maximum speed, or 480 nautical miles (890 km; 550 mi) at 4 knots (7.4 km/h; 4.6 mph). Each boat has an endurance of 70 days.

The issues with the Collins class highlighted in the McIntosh-Prescott Report and the pressing need to have combat-ready submarines in the RAN fleet with the pending decommissioning of Otama, the final Oberon-class submarine in Australian service, prompted the establishment of an A$1 billion program to bring Sheean and sister boat Dechaineux up to an operational standard as quickly as possible, referred to as the "fast track" or "get well" program. The fast track program required the installation of reliable diesel engines, fixing hydrodynamic noise issues by modifying the hull design and propeller, and providing a functional combat system. The original Rockwell International-designed combat system had been cancelled, but because there wasn't enough time to evaluate the replacement system to include it in the "fast track" program, the two submarines were fitted with components from the old Rockwell system, which were augmented by commercial off-the-shelf hardware and software. Even with the enhanced Rockwell system, it was believed that the capabilities of the fast track Collins boats was only equivalent to the Oberons.

Sheean was named for Ordinary Seaman Edward "Teddy" Sheean, who manned an Oerlikon and fired on Japanese aircraft attacking the bathurst-class corvette HMAS Armidale, dying when the ship sank. After his ship was damaged shortly in the fight, an abandon ship order was called. Teddy, realizing that the men in the water would be massacred by the incoming Japanese zeroes, manned an anti-aircraft gun, successfully downing 3 aircraft. Teddy was last seen still at his gun, continuously firing, even as he was pulled under, still strapped to his anti-aircraft gun. Sheean is the only submarine named after an enlisted sailor. The submarine was laid down by Australian Submarine Corporation, on 17 February 1994, launched on 1 May 1999 by Ivy Hayes, Teddy Sheean's sister, and commissioned into the RAN on 23 February 2001.

== Operational history ==
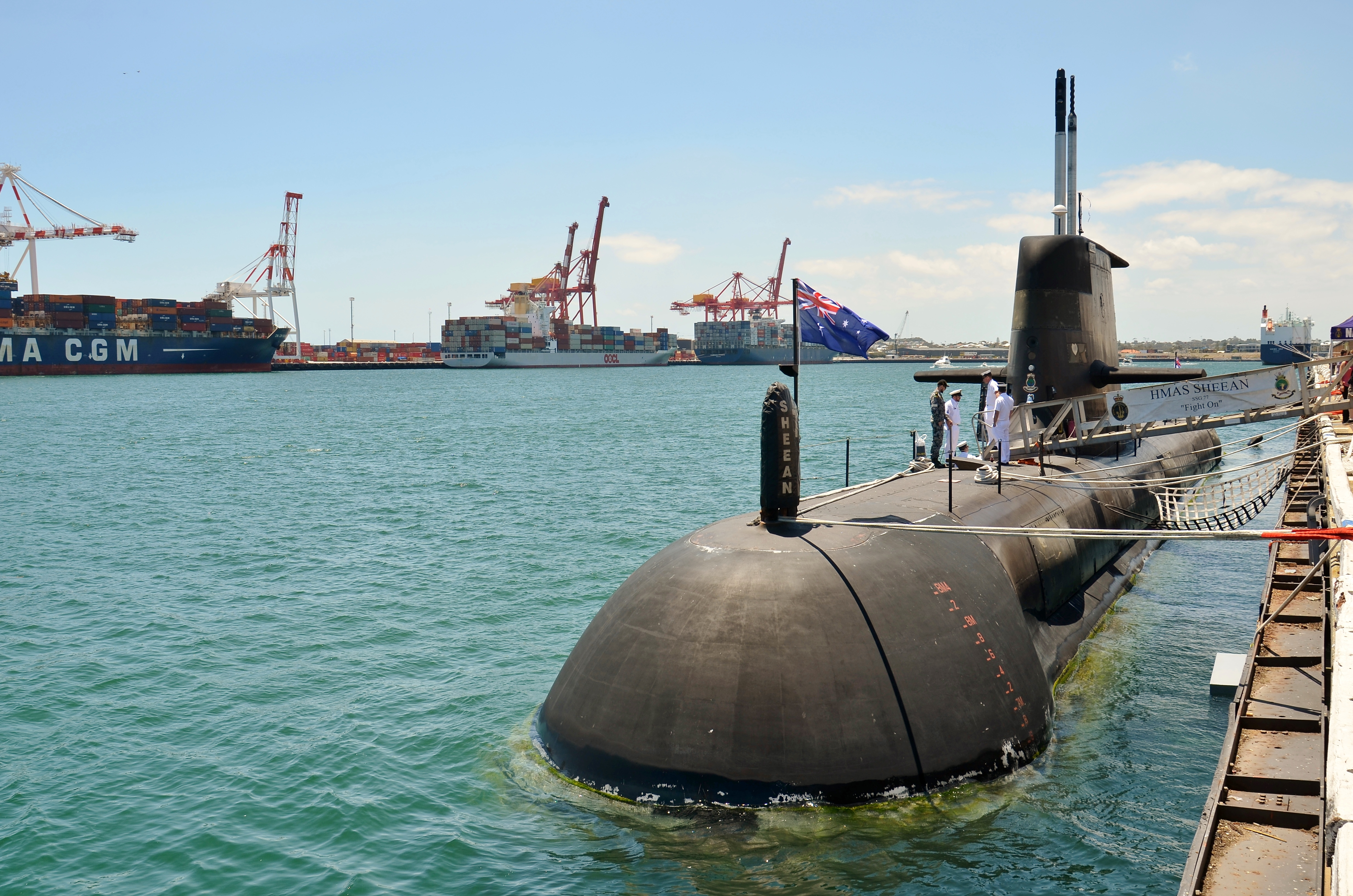
Sheean on display at Maritime Day, Fremantle Harbour, 2016

On 14 December 2000, Sheean and Dechaineux arrived at HMAS Stirling, following the completion of sea trials.

The submarine participated in RIMPAC 02, where Sheean was able to penetrate the air and surface anti-submarine screens of an eight-ship amphibious task force, then successfully attacked both the amphibious assault ship USS Tarawa and the dock landing ship USS Rushmore. During two weeks of combat trials in August 2002, Sheean demonstrated that the class was comparable in the underwater warfare role to the Los Angeles-class nuclear-powered attack submarine USS Olympia. The two submarines traded roles during the exercise and were equally successful in the attacking role, despite Olympia being larger, more powerful, and armed with more advanced torpedoes than Sheean.

In 2006, Sheean was presented with the Gloucester Cup for being the RAN vessel with the greatest overall efficiency over the previous twelve months.

Sheean was docked for a long maintenance period in 2008, but workforce shortages and malfunctions on other submarines requiring urgent attention have drawn this out: RAN and ASC officials predicted in 2010 that she would not be back in service until 2012. The maintenance period ended in late 2012, and Sheean spent the rest of the year working back up to operational status. The submarine was formally returned to service on 23 February 2013.

On 16 July 2013, Sheean was damaged while berthed at the Australian Marine Complex. Combi Dock III, a cargo ship owned by Danish company Combi Lift and intended to supply the Gorgon gas project, broke free of moorings during a storm, and drifted into the submarine, causing damage to Sheean's propeller and steering apparatus. Combi Dock III was impounded by the Australian government until 13 September, when Combi Lift agreed to pay for the damage.

On 21 September 2021 Sheean experienced an emergency during a training exercise when water entered via a pump and the automatic system that is intended to respond to such malfunctions failed. The crew were forced to rapidly bring the submarine to the surface. The Australian Financial Review reported that there were concerns that the submarine's crew had a poor safety culture, and that some members of the crew had requested transfers off the boat due to the trauma they experienced in the accident. The Navy stated that the submarine had experienced a "minor flooding incident" and had not been in danger of sinking, and that it returned to service within a few days of the accident.
