= Sheahan =

Sheahan is a surname. Notable people with the surname include:

- Bill Sheahan (umpire) (born 1953), Australian Test cricket match umpire
- Bill Sheahan (politician) (1895–1975), Australian politician
- Brock Sheahan (born 1984), Canadian ice hockey coach
- Frank D. Sheahan (1901–1974), American politician
- Frankie Sheahan (born 1976), rugby player
- John Sheahan (born 1939), Irish violinist and folk musician
- Maurie Sheahan (1905–1956), Australian rules footballer
- Mike Sheahan (born 1945), Australian journalist
- Paul Sheahan (born 1946), Australian Test cricketer
- Riley Sheahan (born 1991), Canadian ice hockey player
- Robert Sheehan (born 1988), Irish actor
- Terry Sheahan (born 1947), Australian judge and former politician
- Tom Sheahan (born 1968), Irish Fine Gael politician
- Kate Sheahan (born 1982), AFLW Administrator

== See also ==
- Sheehan (disambiguation)
- Sheahon Zenger (born 1966) is an American university sports administrator
