= USS Sheehan =

1943 John C. Butler-class destroyer escort

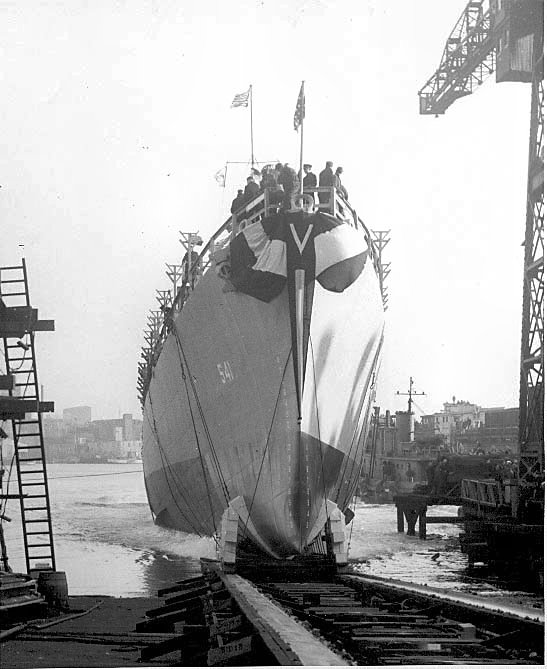
- USS Sheehan is launched at Boston Navy Yard, Boston, Massachusetts, on 17 December 1943.

History

United States
- Name: USS Sheehan
- Namesake: Chief Quartermaster John Francis Sheehan (1910-1942), killed in action aboard fast transport USS Gregory (APD-3)
- Builder: Boston Navy Yard, Boston, Massachusetts
- Laid down: 8 November 1943
- Launched: 17 December 1943
- Sponsored by: Mrs. Catherine Sheehan
- Completed: Never
- Commissioned: Never
- Fate: Construction contract cancelled 7 January 1946; sold for scrap incomplete 2 July 1946

General characteristics
- Class & type: John C. Butler-class destroyer escort
- Displacement: 1,350 tons
- Length: 306 ft (93 m)
- Beam: 36 ft 8 in (11 m)
- Draft: 9 ft 5 in (3 m)
- Propulsion: 2 boilers, 2 geared turbine engines, 12,000 shp; 2 propellers
- Speed: 24 knots (44 km/h)
- Range: 6,000 nmi. (12,000 km) @ 12 kt
- Complement: 14 officers, 201 enlisted
- Armament: 2 × single 5 in (127 mm) guns; 2 × twin 40 mm (1.6 in) AA guns; 10 × single 20 mm (0.79 in) AA guns; 1 × triple 21 in (533 mm) torpedo tubes; 8 × depth charge throwers; 1 × Hedgehog ASW mortar; 2 × depth charge racks

USS Sheehan (DE-541) was a United States Navy John C. Butler-class destroyer escort launched during World War II but never completed.

== Namesake ==
John Francis Sheehan was born on 20 January 1910 at Fall River, Massachusetts. He enlisted in the U.S. Navy on 25 October 1928 at the Navy Recruiting Station at Boston, Massachusetts as a seaman apprentice and transferred the same day to the Naval Training Center at Newport, Rhode Island. Sheehan was rated seaman 2nd class on 27 February 1929, quartermaster 3rd class on 28 July 1930, quartermaster 2nd class on 16 November 1936, quartermaster 1st class on 16 February 1938, and chief quartermaster (acting appointment) on 1 March 1942.

Sheehan was assigned to protected cruiser USS Cleveland on 21 January 1929 and served aboard her until 24 October 1929. He went on to serve aboard minesweeper USS Chewink from 1929 to 1932, heavy cruiser USS Indianapolis from 1932 to 1934, gunboat USS Tulsa from 1934 to 1937, and light cruiser USS Cincinnati from 1937 to 1939. He was stationed at Submarine Base New London at New London, Connecticut, from 9 November 1939 to 10 June 1940, then at INM Electric Boat Company at Bayonne, New Jersey, and then to patrol torpedo boat USS PT-9 on 24 July 1940 where he served briefly with Motor Torpedo Boat Squadron One. He was assigned to fast transport USS Gregory later in 1940. Sheehan received the First Nicaraguan Campaign Medal for his service aboard Cleveland between 19 May 1929 and 2 August 1929, a Good Conduct Medal for his enlistment ending 10 October 1932, and a Good Conduct Pin for his enlistment ending 8 November 1939. His service during World War II was deemed honorable.

Sheehan was killed on the night of 5 September 1942, when Gregory was sunk by gunfire from an Imperial Japanese Navy cruiser and three destroyers during the Naval Battle of Guadalcanal. A U.S. Navy pilot, mistakenly thinking Gregory was a Japanese submarine, dropped a string of flares over the surprised ship, silhouetting her against the blackness and allowing the Japanese to detect her. Desperately overmatched by the four Japanese ships and, despite a gallant effort by its crew, Gregory dead in the water within three minutes. After Gregory's crew had abandoned ship, the Japanese began shelling the helpless survivors in the water, killing 11, including Sheehan.

== Construction ==
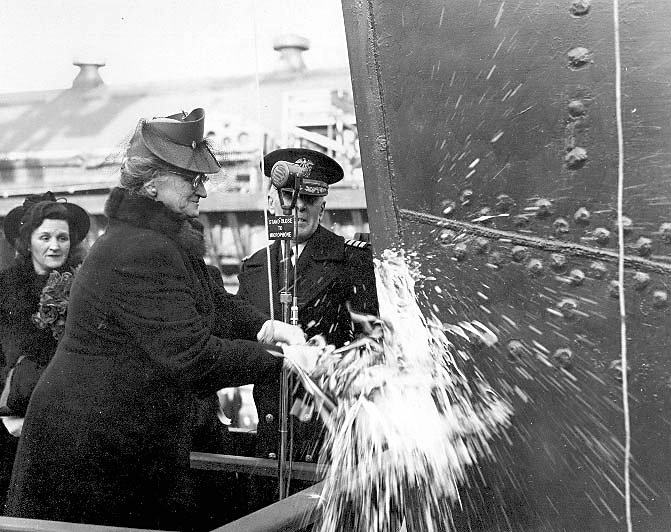
Mrs. Catherine Sheehan christens USS Sheehan at Sheehan's launching on 17 December 1943 at Boston Navy Yard, Boston, Massachusetts.

Sheehan was laid down at Boston Navy Yard at Boston, Massachusetts, on 8 November 1943 and launched on 17 December 1943, sponsored by Mrs. Catherine Sheehan, mother of Chief Quartermaster John Francis Sheehan, the ship's namesake.

Construction of Sheehan was suspended before she could be completed. On 30 August 1945, she was assigned to the Atlantic Inactive Fleet in an incomplete state. On 7 January 1946, the contract for her construction was cancelled, and the incomplete ship was sold on 2 July 1946 to the John J. Duane Company of Quincy, Massachusetts, for scrapping.
