= O'Sheehan =

O'Sheehan, a Gaelic-Irish surname.

== Overview ==
The O'Sheehan (or, as is the more common anglicization, Sheehan) family is an Irish clan traditionally of County Clare. Part of the Dalcassian branch of families, the O'Sheehans themselves played only a small role in Irish politics, as vassals to the more famed O'Briens, who commonly became kings of Thomond and included the Irish legend Brian Boru.

According to historian C. Thomas Cairney, the O'Sheehans were a chiefly family of the Uí Mháine tribe who in turn were from the Dumnonii or Laigin who were the third wave of Celts to settle in Ireland during the first century BC.

The original form of Sheehan is síocháin, meaning peace or peaceful. This in combination with the prefix O', meaning 'descendant of,' could be taken to mean something like 'descendant of peace,' or 'descendant of the peaceful one,' though who this could be referring to remains unclear.

Today, many Sheehans still live in County Clare, though others have since migrated to the United States and other countries, mainly as part of the mass exodus that followed the Great Famine.

== See also ==
- Irish clans
