= Gary Sheehan (ice hockey) =

Gary Sheehan (born June 15, 1964) is a Canadian-Swiss professional ice hockey coach.

== Career ==
A native of Québec, Sheehan came to Switzerland in 1991 to accept a coaching position in the youth ranks of Fribourg-Gottéron. In 1996, he was named assistant coach of Genève-Servette HC in the National League B (NLB), the country's second-tier league. Prior to the 1997–98 season, he was promoted to head coach, but was relieved of his duties in November 1997.

Sheehan then worked in the youth ranks of HC Star Lausanne. In 2003, he took over the head coaching job at Lausanne HC of Switzerland's top-flight National League A (NLA) and remained in the position for two years.

From 2005 to 2013, Sheehan served as head coach of NLB side HC La Chaux-de-Fonds. Under his guidance, the club reached the NLB finals in 2008 and 2009.

He joined the coaching staff of NLA's SC Bern in December 2013, on a contract for the remainder of the 2013-14 campaign.

In April 2014, Sheehan was named head coach of HC Ajoie of the National League B. He guided HCA to the 2016 NLB title, to the 2020 Swiss Cup title and was promoted with HC Ajoie to the National League A, the Swiss top ice hockey league, at the end of the 2020–2021 season.

In February 2022, following 18 consecutives defeats in National League A, he was dismissed by the club's management. Sheehan was named head coach of Swiss third-tier club HC Franches-Montagnes in July 2023. On December 18, 2023, he accepted an offer to become an assistant coach at EHC Olten of the Swiss League.

In December 2023, Sheehan left HC Franches-Montagnes to take on the role of assistant coach at HC Olten. He replaced Lars Leunberger as head coach in January 2024 and led the team to the playoff semifinals. This performance earned him a contract extension for the 2024–2025 season.
