= Tommy Sheehan (Gaelic footballer) =

Irish Gaelic footballer (born 1966)

Personal information
- Native name: Tomás Ó Síocháin (Irish)
- Born: 1966 (age 59–60) Fethard, County Tipperary, Ireland

Sport
- Sport: Gaelic football
- Position: Left wing-forward
Club
- Years: Club
- Fethard
Inter-county
- Years: County
- 1987-1989: Tipperary
Inter-county titles
- Munster titles: 0
- All-Irelands: 0
- NFL: 0
- All Stars: 0

Thomas Sheehan (born 1966) is an Irish retired Gaelic footballer who played as a left wing-forward for the Tipperary senior team.

Born in Fethard, County Tipperary, Sheehan first arrived on the inter-county scene at the age of sixteen when he first linked up with the Tipperary minor team before later joining the under-21 and junior sides. Sheehan joined the senior panel during the 1987 championship.

At club level Sheehan won several championship medals with Fethard.

He retired from inter-county football following the conclusion of the 1989 championship.

In retirement from playing Sheehan became involved in team management and coaching, most notably as a selector with the Tipperary minor team.

== Honours ==
=== Player ===
Tipperary

- McGrath Cup (1): 1989
- Munster Minor Football Championship (1): 1984

Munster Junior Football 1998 All Ireland Junior Football 1998 County Senior Football Titles (6) 1984, 1988, 1991, 1993, 1997, 2001,
