= Bill Sheehan (biologist) =

American biologist and environmental advocate (born 1947)

Bill Sheehan (born August 6, 1947) is a biologist and environmental advocate. He is best known for his work on zero waste and extended producer responsibility through two American nonprofit organizations. He co-founded Product Policy Institute (now UPSTREAM) in 2003 and was Executive Director until 2015. He co-founded GrassRoots Recycling Network in 1995 and was Executive Director until 2003.

In 2017 he co-founded Fungal Diversity Survey, or FunDiS (formerly North American Mycoflora Project). FunDiS is a nonprofit organization that helps community scientists document the diversity and distribution of fungi across North America in order to protect them and their habitats. Sheehan was Board President through 2021.

Sheehan received a doctorate in insect ecology from Cornell University in 1987. He researched ecology of parasitoid wasps for biological control.
